= 21st Parliament of British Columbia =

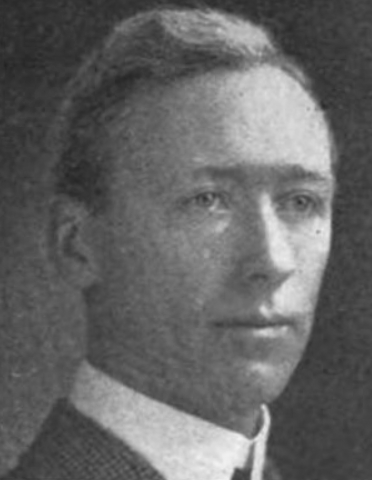
John Hart

The 21st Legislative Assembly of British Columbia sat from 1946 to 1949. The members were elected in the British Columbia general election held in October 1945. The Liberals and Conservatives formed a coalition government led by John Hart. The Co-operative Commonwealth Federation led by Harold Winch formed the official opposition. Hart retired as premier in December 1947 and was replaced by Byron Ingemar "Boss" Johnson.

Norman William Whittaker served as speaker for the assembly until September 1947. Robert Henry Carson then served as speaker until January 1949. Former premier John Hart became speaker the following month.

== Members of the 21st Parliament ==
The following members were elected to the assembly in 1945:

Member	Electoral district	Party	First elected / previously elected	No.# of term(s)
James Mowat	Alberni	Coalition (Liberal)	1941	2nd term
William Duncan Smith	Atlin	Coalition (Liberal)	1945	1st term
Ernest Edward Winch	Burnaby	CCF	1933	4th term
Louis LeBourdais	Cariboo	Coalition (Liberal)	1937	3rd term
Walter Hogg (1948)	Cariboo	Coalition (Liberal)	1948	1st term
Leslie Harvey Eyres	Chilliwack	Coalition (Progressive Conservative)	1937	3rd term
Thomas King	Columbia	Coalition (Liberal)	1931, 1934	5th term*
Herbert John Welch	Comox	Coalition (Liberal)	1945	1st term
Samuel Guthrie	Cowichan-Newcastle	CCF	1920, 1937	4th term*
Frank William Green	Cranbrook	Coalition (Progressive Conservative)	1941	2nd term
Alexander Campbell Hope	Delta	Coalition (Progressive Conservative)	1945	1st term
Roderick Charles MacDonald	Dewdney	Coalition (Progressive Conservative)	1941	2nd term
Charles Taschereau Beard	Esquimalt	Coalition (Progressive Conservative)	1945	1st term
Thomas Aubert Uphill	Fernie	Labour	1920	7th term
John McInnis	Fort George	CCF	1907, (Note: Grand Forks) 1945	2nd term*
Thomas Alfred Love	Grand Forks-Greenwood	Coalition (Progressive Conservative)	1941	2nd term
Robert Henry Carson	Kamloops	Coalition (Liberal)	1933	4th term
Randolph Harding	Kaslo-Slocan	CCF	1945	1st term
Ernest Crawford Carson	Lillooet	Coalition (Progressive Conservative)	1928, 1941	3rd term*
Herbert Gargrave	Mackenzie	CCF	1941	2nd term
George Sharratt Pearson	Nanaimo and the Islands	Coalition (Liberal)	1928	5th term
Frank Putnam	Nelson-Creston	Coalition (Liberal)	1933	4th term
Byron Ingemar Johnson	New Westminster	Coalition (Liberal)	1933, (Note: Victoria City) 1945	4th term*
Kenneth Cattanach MacDonald (Note: Died after the election and before the start of the first session)	North Okanagan	Coalition (Liberal)	1916, 1933	7th term*
Charles William Morrow (1945)	North Okanagan	Coalition (Liberal)	1945	1st term
John Henry Cates	North Vancouver	Coalition (Liberal)	1945	1st term
Herbert Anscomb	Oak Bay	Coalition (Progressive Conservative)	1933	4th term
Edward Fraser Rowland	Omineca	CCF	1945	1st term
Joseph Hardcastle Corsbie	Peace River	CCF	1945	1st term
William Henry Brett	Prince Rupert	CCF	1945	1st term
William James Johnson	Revelstoke	Coalition (Progressive Conservative)	1945	1st term
James Lockhart Webster	Rossland-Trail	Coalition (Liberal)	1945	1st term
James O'Donnell Quinn (1948)	Rossland-Trail	CCF	1948	1st term
Norman William Whittaker	Saanich	Coalition (Liberal)	1933	4th term
Arthur James Richard Ash (1948)	Saanich	Coalition (Liberal)	1948	1st term
Arthur Brown Ritchie	Salmon Arm	Coalition (Progressive Conservative)	1945	1st term
Reginald Robert Laird	Similkameen	Coalition (Liberal)	1945	1st term
Edward Tourtellotte Kenney	Skeena	Coalition (Liberal)	1933	4th term
William Andrew Cecil Bennett	South Okanagan	Coalition (Progressive Conservative)	1941	2nd term
Robert Denis Browne-Clayton (1948)	South Okanagan	Coalition (Progressive Conservative)	1948	1st term
Donald Cameron Brown	Vancouver-Burrard	Coalition (Progressive Conservative)	1945	1st term
George Moir Weir	Vancouver-Burrard	Coalition (Progressive Conservative)	1933, (Note: Vancouver-Point Grey) 1945	3rd term*
Allan James McDonell	Vancouver Centre	Coalition (Progressive Conservative)	1945	1st term
Gordon Sylvester Wismer	Vancouver Centre	Coalition (Liberal)	1933, 1945	3rd term*
Arthur James Turner	Vancouver East	CCF	1941	2nd term
Harold Edward Winch	Vancouver East	CCF	1933	4th term
Royal Lethington Maitland	Vancouver-Point Grey	Coalition (Progressive Conservative)	1928, 1937	4th term*
James Alexander Paton	Vancouver-Point Grey	Coalition (Progressive Conservative)	1937	3rd term
Tilly Jean Rolston	Vancouver-Point Grey	Coalition (Progressive Conservative)	1941	2nd term
Albert Reginald MacDougall (1946)	Vancouver-Point Grey	Coalition (Progressive Conservative)	1946	1st term
Leigh Forbes Stevenson (1946)	Vancouver-Point Grey	Coalition (Progressive Conservative)	1946	1st term
John Hart	Victoria City	Coalition (Liberal)	1916, 1933	6th term*
Nancy Hodges	Victoria City	Coalition (Liberal)	1941	2nd term
William Thomas Straith	Victoria City	Coalition (Liberal)	1937	3rd term
John Joseph Alban Gillis	Yale	Coalition (Liberal)	1928	5th term

== Party standings ==
Affiliation	Members
Liberal-Conservative coalition	37
Co-operative Commonwealth	10
Labour	1
Total	48
Government Majority	26

== By-elections ==
By-elections were held to replace members for various reasons:

Electoral district	Member elected	Party	Election date	Reason
North Okanagan	Charles William Morrow	Coalition	December 19, 1945	K.C. MacDonald died November 19, 1945
Vancouver-Point Grey	Albert Reginald MacDougall	Coalition	June 24, 1946	J.A. Paton died February 19, 1946
Vancouver-Point Grey	Leigh Forbes Stevenson	Coalition	June 24, 1946	R.L. Maitland died March 28, 1946
Cariboo	Walter Hogg	Coalition	February 23, 1948	L. LeBourdais died September 27, 1947
Saanich	Arthur James Richard Ash	Coalition	February 23, 1948	N.W. Whittaker resigned September 13, 1947; named to B.C. Supreme Court
Rossland-Trail	James O'Donnell Quinn	CCF	November 29, 1948	J.L. Webster died August 8, 1948
South Okanagan	Robert Denis Browne-Clayton	Coalition	February 23, 1948	W.A.C. Bennett resigned May 17, 1948, to contest federal by-election
