= 20th Parliament of British Columbia =

Legislative assembly

Diagram of the 20th Parliament of British Columbia in 1941

The 20th Legislative Assembly of British Columbia sat from 1941 to 1945. The members were elected in the British Columbia general election held in June 1941. The Liberals and Conservatives formed a coalition government led by John Hart. The Co-operative Commonwealth Federation led by Harold Winch formed the official opposition.

Norman William Whittaker served as speaker for the assembly.

== Members of the 20th Parliament ==
The following members were elected to the assembly in 1941.:

Member	Electoral district	Party	First elected / previously elected	No.# of term(s)
James Mowat	Alberni	Liberal	1941	1st term
James Mowat	Alberni	Coalition (Liberal)	1941	1st term
William James Asselstine	Atlin	Liberal	1933	3rd term
William James Asselstine	Atlin	Coalition (Liberal)	1933	3rd term
Ernest Edward Winch	Burnaby	CCF	1933	3rd term
Louis LeBourdais	Cariboo	Liberal	1937	2nd term
Louis LeBourdais	Cariboo	Coalition (Liberal)	1937	2nd term
Leslie Harvey Eyres	Chilliwack	Conservative	1937	2nd term
Leslie Harvey Eyres	Chilliwack	Coalition (Conservative/ Prog. Conservative)	1937	2nd term
Thomas King	Columbia	Liberal	1931, 1934	4th term*
Thomas King	Columbia	Coalition (Liberal)	1931, 1934	4th term*
Colin Cameron	Comox	CCF	1937	2nd term
Samuel Guthrie	Cowichan-Newcastle	CCF	1920, 1937	3rd term*
Frank William Green	Cranbrook	Conservative	1941	1st term
Frank William Green	Cranbrook	Coalition (Conservative/ Prog. Conservative)	1941	1st term
Leonard Alec Shepherd	Delta	CCF	1937	2nd term
Roderick Charles MacDonald	Dewdney	Conservative	1941	1st term
Roderick Charles MacDonald	Dewdney	Coalition (Conservative/ Prog. Conservative)	1941	1st term
Elmer Victor Finland	Esquimalt	Conservative	1937	2nd term
Elmer Victor Finland	Esquimalt	Coalition (Conservative/ Prog. Conservative)	1937	2nd term
Thomas Aubert Uphill	Fernie	Labour	1920	6th term
Henry George Thomas Perry	Fort George	Liberal	1920, 1933	5th term*
Henry George Thomas Perry	Fort George	Coalition (Liberal)	1920, 1933	5th term*
Thomas Alfred Love	Grand Forks-Greenwood	Conservative	1941	1st term
Thomas Alfred Love	Grand Forks-Greenwood	Coalition (Conservative/ Prog. Conservative)	1941	1st term
Robert Henry Carson	Kamloops	Liberal	1933	3rd term
Robert Henry Carson	Kamloops	Coalition (Liberal)	1933	3rd term
Charles Sidney Leary	Kaslo-Slocan	Liberal	1924, 1933	4th term*
Charles Sidney Leary	Kaslo-Slocan	Coalition (Liberal)	1924, 1933	4th term*
Ernest Crawford Carson	Lillooet	Conservative	1928, 1941	2nd term*
Ernest Crawford Carson	Lillooet	Coalition (Conservative/ Prog. Conservative)	1928, 1941	2nd term*
Herbert Gargrave	Mackenzie	CCF	1941	1st term
George Sharratt Pearson	Nanaimo and the Islands	Liberal	1928	4th term
George Sharratt Pearson	Nanaimo and the Islands	Coalition (Liberal)	1928	4th term
Frank Putnam	Nelson-Creston	Liberal	1933	3rd term
Frank Putnam	Nelson-Creston	Coalition (Liberal)	1933	3rd term
Arthur Wellesley Gray	New Westminster	Liberal	1924	5th term
Arthur Wellesley Gray	New Westminster	Coalition (Liberal)	1924	5th term
Byron Ingemar Johnson (1945)	New Westminster	Liberal	1933, (Note: Victoria City) 1945	3rd term*
Byron Ingemar Johnson (1945)	New Westminster	Coalition (Liberal)	1933, 1945	3rd term*
Kenneth Cattanach MacDonald	North Okanagan	Liberal	1916, 1933	6th term*
Kenneth Cattanach MacDonald	North Okanagan	Coalition (Liberal)	1916, 1933	6th term*
Dorothy Steeves	North Vancouver	CCF	1934	3rd term
Herbert Anscomb	Oak Bay	Conservative	1933	3rd term
Herbert Anscomb	Oak Bay	Coalition (Conservative/ Prog. Conservative)	1933	3rd term
Mark Matthew Connelly	Omineca	Liberal	1936	3rd term
Mark Matthew Connelly	Omineca	Coalition (Liberal)	1936	3rd term
Glen Everton Braden	Peace River	Liberal	1937	2nd term
Glen Everton Braden	Peace River	Coalition (Liberal)	1937	2nd term
Thomas Dufferin Pattullo	Prince Rupert	Liberal	1916	7th term
Harry Johnston	Revelstoke	Liberal	1937	2nd term
Harry Johnston	Revelstoke	Coalition (Liberal)	1937	2nd term
Vincent Segur (1943)	Revelstoke	CCF	1943	1st term
Herbert Wilfred Herridge	Rossland-Trail	CCF	1941	1st term
Norman William Whittaker	Saanich	Liberal	1933	3rd term
Norman William Whittaker	Saanich	Coalition (Liberal)	1933	3rd term
Rolf Wallgren Bruhn	Salmon Arm	Conservative	1924	5th term
Rolf Wallgren Bruhn	Salmon Arm	Coalition (Conservative/ Prog. Conservative)	1924	5th term
George Faulds Stirling (1942)	Salmon Arm	CCF	1942	1st term
Bernard George Webber	Similkameen	CCF	1941	1st term
Edward Tourtellotte Kenney	Skeena	Liberal	1933	3rd term
Edward Tourtellotte Kenney	Skeena	Coalition (Liberal)	1933	3rd term
William Andrew Cecil Bennett	South Okanagan	Conservative	1941	1st term
William Andrew Cecil Bennett	South Okanagan	Coalition (Conservative/ Prog. Conservative)	1941	1st term
Winona Grace MacInnis	Vancouver-Burrard	CCF	1941	1st term
Charles Grant MacNeil	Vancouver-Burrard	CCF	1941	1st term
Laura Emma Marshall Jamieson	Vancouver Centre	CCF	1939	2nd term
Wallis Walter LeFeaux	Vancouver Centre	CCF	1941	1st term
Arthur James Turner	Vancouver East	CCF	1941	1st term
Harold Edward Winch	Vancouver East	CCF	1933	3rd term
Royal Lethington Maitland	Vancouver-Point Grey	Conservative	1928, 1937	3rd term*
Royal Lethington Maitland	Vancouver-Point Grey	Coalition (Conservative/ Prog. Conservative)	1928, 1937	3rd term*
James Alexander Paton	Vancouver-Point Grey	Conservative	1937	2nd term
James Alexander Paton	Vancouver-Point Grey	Coalition (Conservative/ Prog. Conservative)	1937	2nd term
Tilly Jean Rolston	Vancouver-Point Grey	Conservative	1941	1st term
Tilly Jean Rolston	Vancouver-Point Grey	Coalition (Conservative/ Prog. Conservative)	1941	1st term
John Hart	Victoria City	Liberal	1916, 1933	5th term*
John Hart	Victoria City	Coalition (Liberal)	1916, 1933	5th term*
Nancy Hodges	Victoria City	Liberal	1941	1st term
Nancy Hodges	Victoria City	Coalition (Liberal)	1941	1st term
William Thomas Straith	Victoria City	Liberal	1937	2nd term
William Thomas Straith	Victoria City	Coalition (Liberal)	1937	2nd term
John Joseph Alban Gillis	Yale	Liberal	1928	4th term
John Joseph Alban Gillis	Yale	Coalition (Liberal)	1928	4th term

== Party standings ==
Affiliation	Members
Liberal	21
Co-operative Commonwealth	14
Conservative	12
Labour	1
Total	48
Government Majority	16 (Note: Former Liberal Party leader Thomas Dufferin Pattullo did not support the coalition, which therefore had 32 seats.)

== By-elections ==
By-elections were held to replace members for various reasons:

Electoral district	Member elected	Party	Election date	Reason
Salmon Arm	George Faulds Stirling	CCF	November 25, 1942	R.W. Bruhn died August 30, 1942
Revelstoke	Vincent Segur	CCF	June 14, 1943	H. Johnston died January 21, 1943
New Westminster	Byron Ingemar Johnson	Coalition	May 10, 1945	A.W. Gray died May 7, 1944

== Other changes ==
- Rossland-Trail (res. Herbert Wilfred Herridge to contest the 1945 Federal Election)
