= 1945 British Columbia general election =

Canadian provincial election

- October 25, 1945

48 seats of the Legislative Assembly of British Columbia 25 seats needed for a majority
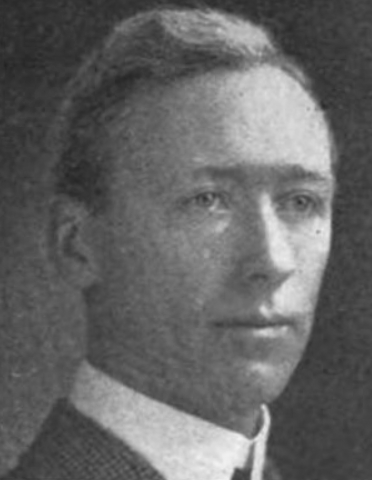

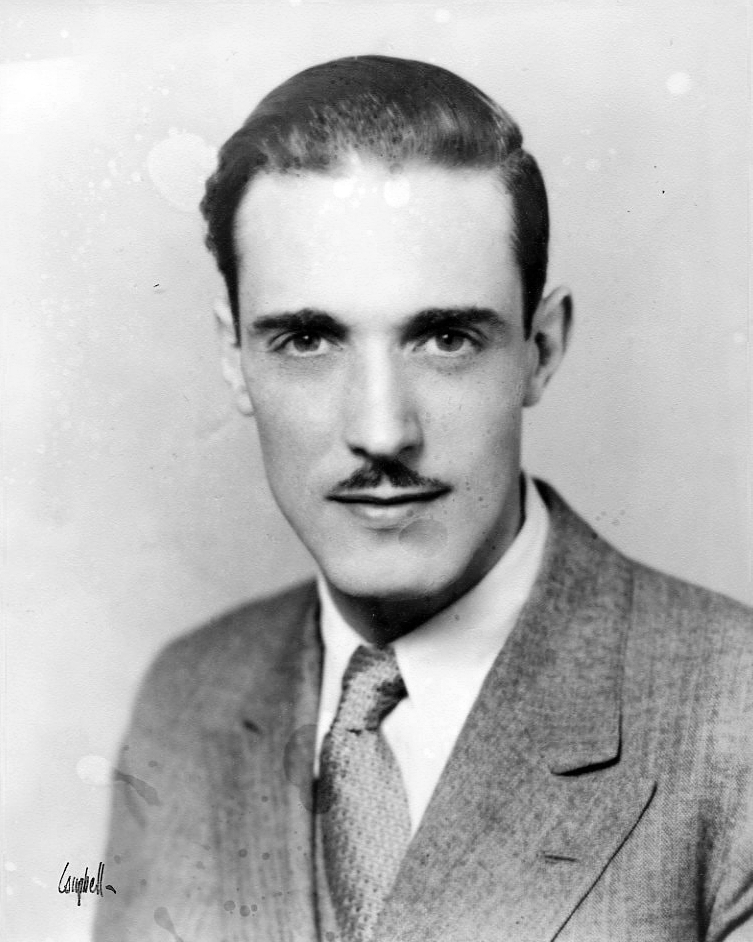
	First party	Second party
Leader	John Hart (Liberal leader)	Harold Winch
Party	Liberal-Conservative Coalition	Co-operative Commonwealth
Leader since	1941	1938
Leader's seat	Victoria City	Vancouver East
Last election	33 (Note: The Liberals and Conservatives ran separately in the 1941 election. In that election, the Liberals won 21 seats and the Conservatives won 12 seats.)	14
Seats won	37	10
Seat change	▲4	▼4
Popular vote	261,147	175,960
Percentage	55.83%	37.62%
Swing	▼8.02pp	▲4.26pp
Premier before election
John Hart
Coalition
Premier after election
John Hart
Coalition

The 1945 British Columbia general election was the 21st general election in the Province of British Columbia, Canada. It was held to elect members of the Legislative Assembly of British Columbia. The election was called on August 31, 1945, and held on October 25, 1945. The new legislature met for the first time on February 21, 1946.

A centre-right coalition was formed by the Liberal and Conservative (now called the Progressive Conservative) parties in order to defeat the social democratic Co-operative Commonwealth Federation.

Although the Coalition won fewer votes than the Liberal and Conservative parties won in total in the previous election, the Coalition still won more than half of the votes, captured more than half the seats, and formed a majority government.

== Results ==
Elections to the 21st Legislative Assembly of British Columbia (1945)
Political party	Party leader	MLAs				Votes			
Political party	Party leader	Candidates	1941	1945	±	#	±	%	± (pp)
Coalition	John Hart Royal Maitland	47	32	37	5▲	261,147	26,979▼	55.83	7.65▼
Co-operative Commonwealth	Harold Winch	48	14	10	4▼	175,960	24,520▲	37.62	4.26▲
Labour (all factions)		2	1	1	Steady	1,395	5,746▼	0.30	1.27▼
Liberal (Note: Duff Pattullo was the sole Liberal that chose not to join the Coalition, and Prince Rupert was the only district where the Coalition did not field a candidate in 1945. Pattullo stood as an independent in this election.)		–	1	–	1▼	–	1,681▼	–	Changed allegiance
Labor-Progressive Party (LPP)		21	–	–	–	16,479	16,479▲	3.52	New
Social Credit (alliance)		16	–	–	–	6,627	6,627▲	1.42	New
People's CCF		2	–	–	–	2,786	2,786▲	0.60	New
Independent		2	–	–	–	1,532	106▼	0.33	0.03▼
Independent PC		2	–	–	–	748	748▲	0.16	New
Democratic		1	–	–	–	423	423▲	0.09	New
Socialist Labor		3	–	–	–	285	398▼	0.06	0.09▼
Independent Liberal		1	–	–	–	199	199▲	0.04	New
Socialist		1	–	–	–	105	105▲	0.02	New
Progressive Liberal		1	–	–	–	61	61▲	0.01	New
Total		147	48	48		467,747		100.00%	
Rejected ballots						3,899	898▼		
Actual voters who voted						298,387	5,514▼	62.66%	10.07▼
Registered voters						476,222	58,383▲		

Seats and popular vote by party
Party	Seats	Votes	Change (pp)
█ Coalition	37 / 48	55.83%	-7.65
█ Co-operative Commonwealth	10 / 48	37.62%	4.26
█ Labor-Progressive	0 / 48	3.52%	3.52
█ Social Credit	0 / 48	1.42%	1.42
█ Other	1 / 48	1.61%	-1.55

== MLAs elected ==
Alberni: James Mowat
Atlin: William Duncan Smith
Burnaby: Ernest Winch
Cariboo: Louis LeBourdais
Chilliwack: Leslie Harvey Eyres
Columbia: Thomas King
Comox: Herbert John Welch
Cowichan-Newcastle: Samuel Guthrie
Cranbrook: Frank William Green
Delta: Alexander Campbell Hope
Dewdney: Roderick Charles MacDonald
Esquimalt: Charles Taschereau Beard
Fernie: Thomas Aubert Uphill (ILP)
Fort George: John McInnis
Grand Forks-Greenwood: Thomas Alfred Love
Kamloops: Robert Henry Carson
Kaslo-Slocan: Randolph Harding
Lillooet: Ernest Crawford Carson
Mackenzie: Herbert Gargrave
Nanaimo and the Islands: George Sharratt Pearson
Nelson-Creston: Frank Putnam
New Westminster: Boss Johnson
North Okanagan: K. C. MacDonald (Note: Died before the opening of the new legislature. Charles William Morrow would win the subsequent byelection for the Coalition.)
North Vancouver: John Henry Cates
Oak Bay: Herbert Anscomb
Omineca: Edward Fraser Rowland
Peace River: Joseph Hardcastle Corsbie
Prince Rupert: William Henry Brett
Revelstoke: William James Johnson
Rossland-Trail: James Lockhart Webster
Saanich: Norman William Whittaker
Salmon Arm: Arthur Brown Ritchie
Similkameen: Reginald Robert Laird
Skeena: Edward Tourtellotte Kenney
South Okanagan: W. A. C. Bennett
Vancouver-Burrard: Donald Cameron Brown
Vancouver-Burrard: George Moir Weir
Vancouver Centre: Allan James McDonell
Vancouver Centre: Gordon Sylvester Wismer
Vancouver East: Arthur James Turner
Vancouver East: Harold Winch
Vancouver-Point Grey: Royal Maitland
Vancouver-Point Grey: James Alexander Paton
Vancouver-Point Grey: Tilly Rolston
Victoria City: John Hart
Victoria City: Nancy Hodges
Victoria City: William Thomas Straith
Yale: John J. Gillis

=== Synopsis of results ===
Results by riding - 1945 British Columbia general election (single-member districts)
Riding	Winning party						Votes						
Name	1941	Party	Votes	Share	Margin #	Margin %	Coal	CCF	LPP	SC	Ind	Oth	Total
Alberni	Lib	Coal	2,135	54.02%	877	22.19%	2,135	1,258	559	–	–	–	3,952
Atlin	Lib	Coal	297	50.42%	5	0.84%	297	292	–	–	–	–	589
Burnaby	CCF	CCF	5,905	50.56%	1,172	10.04%	4,733	5,905	744	298	–	–	11,680
Cariboo	Lib	Coal	1,370	57.93%	375	15.86%	1,370	995	–	–	–	–	2,365
Chilliwack	Con	Coal	3,804	62.37%	1,509	24.74%	3,804	2,295	–	–	–	–	6,099
Columbia	Lib	Coal	671	53.30%	83	6.60%	671	588	–	–	–	–	1,259
Comox	CCF	Coal	3,432	45.62%	70	0.93%	3,432	3,362	729	–	–	–	7,523
Cowichan-Newcastle	CCF	CCF	3,768	55.33%	726	10.66%	3,042	3,768	–	–	–	–	6,810
Cranbrook	Con	Coal	2,077	49.04%	112	2.64%	2,077	1,965	193	–	–	–	4,235
Delta	CCF	Coal	5,859	53.64%	796	7.28%	5,859	5,063	–	–	–	–	10,922
Dewdney	Con	Coal	4,586	53.71%	633	7.42%	4,586	3,953	–	–	–	–	8,539
Esquimalt	Con	Coal	2,568	56.35%	579	12.70%	2,568	1,989	–	–	–	–	4,557
Fernie	Lab	Lab	1,289	42.28%	271	8.89%	1,018	742	–	–	–	1,289	3,049
Fort George	Lib	CCF	1,726	55.73%	355	11.46%	1,371	1,726	–	–	–	–	3,097
Grand Forks-Greenwood	Con	Coal	707	52.06%	246	18.11%	707	461	84	–	–	106	1,358
Kamloops	Lib	Coal	2,804	57.78%	911	18.77%	2,804	1,893	156	–	–	–	4,853
Kaslo-Slocan	Lib	CCF	1,098	53.12%	129	6.24%	969	1,098	–	–	–	–	2,067
Lillooet	Con	Coal	1,143	51.42%	320	14.40%	1,143	823	–	196	–	61	2,233
Mackenzie	CCF	CCF	2,961	52.19%	648	11.42%	2,313	2,961	293	106	–	–	5,673
Nanaimo and the Islands	Lib	Coal	3,124	54.24%	577	10.02%	3,124	2,547	–	89	–	–	5,760
Nelson-Creston	Lib	Coal	3,055	58.59%	1,806	34.64%	3,055	1,249	–	–	184	726	5,214
New Westminster	Lib	Coal	4,900	57.91%	1,933	22.85%	4,900	2,967	595	–	–	–	8,462
North Okanagan	Lib	Coal	2,990	59.78%	1,408	28.15%	2,990	1,582	–	430	–	–	5,002
North Vancouver	CCF	Coal	5,912	54.20%	1,842	16.89%	5,912	4,070	646	280	–	–	10,908
Oak Bay	Con	Coal	4,598	82.31%	3,610	64.62%	4,598	988	–	–	–	–	5,586
Omineca	Lib	CCF	932	51.58%	57	3.16%	875	932	–	–	–	–	1,807
Peace River	Lib	CCF	1,682	47.85%	565	16.07%	1,117	1,682	–	716	–	–	3,515
Prince Rupert	Lib	CCF	1,873	49.83%	525	13.97%	–	1,873	538	–	1,348	–	3,759
Revelstoke	Lib	Coal	1,089	51.17%	50	2.34%	1,089	1,039	–	–	–	–	2,128
Rossland-Trail	CCF	Coal	3,171	49.35%	1,111	17.29%	3,171	933	–	261	–	2,060	6,425
Saanich	Lib	Coal	5,414	57.85%	1,983	21.19%	5,414	3,431	239	–	–	275	9,359
Salmon Arm	Con	Coal	1,560	60.00%	520	20.00%	1,560	1,040	–	–	–	–	2,600
Similkameen	CCF	Coal	3,447	57.09%	856	14.18%	3,447	2,591	–	–	–	–	6,038
Skeena	Lib	Coal	901	58.7%	267	17.40%	901	634	–	–	–	–	1,535
South Okanagan	Con	Coal	3,706	64.25%	1,644	28.50%	3,706	2,062	–	–	–	–	5,768
Yale	Lib	Coal	1,077	66.77%	541	33.54%	1,077	536	–	–	–	–	1,613

= open seat
= winning candidate was in previous Legislature
= incumbent had switched allegiance
= previously incumbent in another riding
= not incumbent; was previously elected to the Legislature
= incumbency arose from byelection gain
= other incumbents renominated
= multiple candidates

Results by riding - 1945 British Columbia general election (multiple-member districts)
Riding		Winning party		Votes						
Name	MLAs	1941	1945	Coal	CCF	LPP	SC	Ind	Oth	Total
Vancouver-Burrard	2	2	2	29,649	20,221	2,030	1,219	–	107	53,226
Vancouver Centre	2	2	2	21,854	15,000	3,967	959	–	426	42,206
Vancouver East	2	2	2	18,980	25,721	2,798	705	–	56	48,260
Vancouver-Point Grey	3	3	3	67,276	26,859	2,472	625	–	423	97,655
Victoria City	3	3	3	31,553	16,866	436	743	–	473	50,071

== See also ==
- List of British Columbia political parties
