= 19th Parliament of British Columbia =

The 19th Legislative Assembly of British Columbia sat from 1937 to 1941. The members were elected in the British Columbia general election held in June 1937. The Liberal Party, led by Thomas Dufferin Pattullo, formed the government. The Conservative Party formed the official opposition.

Norman William Whittaker (Liberal) served as speaker for the assembly.

== Members of the 19th Parliament ==
The following members were elected to the assembly in 1937.:

Member	Electoral district	Party	First elected / previously elected	No.# of term(s)
George Sharratt Pearson	Alberni-Nanaimo	Liberal	1928	3rd term
William James Asselstine	Atlin	Liberal	1933	2nd term
Ernest Edward Winch	Burnaby	CCF	1933	2nd term
Louis LeBourdais	Cariboo	Liberal	1937	1st term
Leslie Harvey Eyres	Chilliwack	Conservative	1937	2nd term
Thomas King	Columbia	Liberal	1931, 1934	3rd term*
Colin Cameron	Comox	CCF	1937	2nd term
Samuel Guthrie	Cowichan-Newcastle	CCF	1920, 1937	2nd term*
Frank Mitchell MacPherson	Cranbrook	Liberal	1928	3rd term
Arnold Joseph McGrath (1939)	Cranbrook	Liberal	1939	1st term
Leonard Alec Shepherd	Delta	CCF	1937	1st term
Frank Porter Patterson	Dewdney	Conservative	1937	1st term
David William Strachan (1938)	Dewdney	Liberal	1933, 1938	2nd term*
Elmer Victor Finland	Esquimalt	Conservative	1937	1st term
Thomas Aubert Uphill	Fernie	Labour	1920	5th term
Henry George Thomas Perry	Fort George	Liberal	1920, 1933	4th term*
Ezra Churchill Henniger	Grand Forks-Greenwood	Liberal	1920, 1937	2nd term*
Macgregor Fullarton MacIntosh	The Islands	Conservative	1931, 1937	2nd term*
Robert Henry Carson	Kamloops	Liberal	1933	2nd term
Charles Sidney Leary	Kaslo-Slocan	Liberal	1924, 1933	3rd term*
George Matheson Murray	Lillooet	Liberal	1933	2nd term
John Melvin Bryan, Sr.	Mackenzie	Liberal	1924, 1933	3rd term*
Manfred McGeer (1940)	Mackenzie	Liberal	1940	1st term
Frank Putnam	Nelson-Creston	Liberal	1933	2nd term
Arthur Wellesley Gray	New Westminster	Liberal	1924	4th term
Kenneth Cattanach MacDonald	North Okanagan	Liberal	1916, 1933	5th term*
Dorothy Steeves	North Vancouver	CCF	1934	2nd term
Mark Matthew Connelly	Omineca	Liberal	1936	2nd term
Glen Everton Braden	Peace River	Liberal	1937	1st term
Thomas Dufferin Pattullo	Prince Rupert	Liberal	1916	6th term
Harry Johnston	Revelstoke	Liberal	1937	1st term
Richard Ronald Burns	Rossland-Trail	Liberal	1933	2nd term
Norman William Whittaker	Saanich	Liberal	1933	2nd term
Rolf Wallgren Bruhn	Salmon Arm	Independent	1924	4th term
Rolf Wallgren Bruhn	Salmon Arm	Conservative	1924	4th term
Charles Herbert Percy Tupper	Similkameen	Liberal	1933	2nd term
Edward Tourtellotte Kenney	Skeena	Liberal	1933	2nd term
Cecil Robert Bull	South Okanagan	Liberal	1937	1st term
John Howard Forester	Vancouver-Burrard	Liberal	1936	2nd term
Helen Douglas Smith	Vancouver-Burrard	Liberal	1933	2nd term
Fred Crone	Vancouver Centre	Liberal	1937	1st term
Gordon Sylvester Wismer	Vancouver Centre	Liberal	1933	2nd term
Laura Emma Marshall Jamieson (1939)	Vancouver Centre	CCF	1939	1st term
James Lyle Telford	Vancouver East	CCF	1937	1st term
James Lyle Telford	Vancouver East	Independent	1937	1st term
Harold Edward Winch	Vancouver East	CCF	1933	2nd term
Royal Lethington Maitland	Vancouver-Point Grey	Conservative	1928, 1937	2nd term*
James Alexander Paton	Vancouver-Point Grey	Conservative	1937	1st term
George Moir Weir	Vancouver-Point Grey	Liberal	1933	2nd term
Herbert Anscomb	Victoria City	Conservative	1933	2nd term
John Hart	Victoria City	Liberal	1916, 1933	4th term*
Joseph Douglas Hunter	Victoria City	Conservative	1937	1st term
William Thomas Straith	Victoria City	Liberal	1937	1st term
John Joseph Alban Gillis	Yale	Liberal	1928	3rd term

== Party standings ==
Affiliation	Members
Liberal	31
Conservative	8
Co-operative Commonwealth	7
Independent	1
Labour	1
Total	48
Government Majority	14

== By-elections ==
By-elections were held to replace members for various reasons:

Electoral district	Member elected	Party	Election date	Reason
Dewdney	David William Strachan	Liberal	May 20, 1938	F.P. Patterson died February 10, 1938
Vancouver Centre	Laura Emma Marshall Jamieson	CCF	May 1, 1939	F. Crone died April 3, 1939
Cranbrook	Arnold Joseph McGrath	Liberal	October 26, 1939	E.M. MacPherson resigned September 27, 1939; named to federal Board of Transport Commissioners
Mackenzie	Manfred McGeer	Liberal	September 21, 1940	J.M. Bryan died May 5, 1940

== Other changes ==
- Rolf Wallgren Bruhn joins the Conservatives in 1938.
- James Lyle Telford expelled from the CCF on June 26, 1939, and becomes an independent.
