= 22nd Parliament of British Columbia =

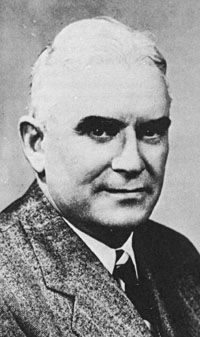
Byron Ingemar Johnson

The 22nd Legislative Assembly of British Columbia sat from 1950 to 1952. The members were elected in the British Columbia general election held in June 1949. From 1950 to 1952, the Liberals and Conservatives formed a coalition government led by Byron Ingemar "Boss" Johnson, and the Co-operative Commonwealth Federation led by Harold Winch formed the Official Opposition. On January 19, 1952, the coalition split and the Liberals formed a single-party minority government, while the Conservatives moved to the opposition benches and took the role of Official Opposition.

Nancy Hodges served as Speaker of the Legislative Assembly.

== Members of the 22nd Parliament ==
The following members were elected to the assembly in 1949:

Member	Electoral district	Party	First elected / previously elected	No.# of term(s)
James Mowat	Alberni	Independent	1941	3rd term
James Mowat	Alberni	Coalition (Liberal)	1941	3rd term
James Mowat	Alberni	Liberal	1941	3rd term
Frank Arthur Calder	Atlin	CCF	1949	1st term
Ernest Edward Winch	Burnaby	CCF	1933	5th term
Angus MacLean	Cariboo	Coalition (Liberal)	1949	1st term
Angus MacLean	Cariboo	Liberal	1949	1st term
Leslie Harvey Eyres	Chilliwack	Coalition (Progressive Conservative)	1937	4th term
Leslie Harvey Eyres	Chilliwack	Progressive Conservative	1937	4th term
Thomas King	Columbia	Coalition (Liberal)	1931, 1934	6th term*
Thomas King	Columbia	Liberal	1931, 1934	6th term*
Herbert John Welch	Comox	Coalition (Liberal)	1945	2nd term
Andrew Mowatt Whisker	Cowichan-Newcastle	Coalition (Liberal)	1949	1st term
Andrew Mowatt Whisker	Cowichan-Newcastle	Liberal	1949	1st term
Leo Thomas Nimsick	Cranbrook	CCF	1949	1st term
Alexander Campbell Hope	Delta	Coalition (Progressive Conservative)	1945	2nd term
Alexander Campbell Hope	Delta	Progressive Conservative	1945	2nd term
Roderick Charles MacDonald	Dewdney	Coalition (Progressive Conservative)	1941	3rd term
Roderick Charles MacDonald	Dewdney	Progressive Conservative	1941	3rd term
Charles Taschereau Beard	Esquimalt	Coalition (Progressive Conservative)	1945	2nd term
Charles Taschereau Beard	Esquimalt	Liberal	1945	2nd term
Frank Mitchell (1951)	Esquimalt	CCF	1951	1st term
Thomas Aubert Uphill	Fernie	Labour	1920	8th term
Henry Robson Bowman	Fort George	Coalition (Liberal)	1949	1st term
Henry Robson Bowman	Fort George	Liberal	1949	1st term
Rupert Williams Haggen	Grand Forks-Greenwood	CCF	1949	1st term
Sidney John Smith	Kamloops	Coalition (Liberal)	1949	1st term
Sidney John Smith	Kamloops	Liberal	1949	1st term
Randolph Harding	Kaslo-Slocan	CCF	1945	2nd term
Ernest Crawford Carson	Lillooet	Coalition (Progressive Conservative)	1928, 1941	4th term*
Ernest Crawford Carson	Lillooet	Progressive Conservative	1928, 1941	4th term*
Battleman Milton MacIntyre	Mackenzie	Coalition (Liberal)	1949	1st term
George Sharratt Pearson	Nanaimo and the Islands	Coalition (Liberal)	1928	6th term
George Sharratt Pearson	Nanaimo and the Islands	Liberal	1928	6th term
Walter Hendricks	Nelson-Creston	Coalition (Liberal)	1949	1st term
Walter Hendricks	Nelson-Creston	Liberal	1949	1st term
Byron Ingemar Johnson	New Westminster	Coalition (Liberal)	1933, (Note: Victoria City) 1945	5th term*
Byron Ingemar Johnson	New Westminster	Liberal	1933, 1945	5th term*
Charles William Morrow	North Okanagan	Coalition (Liberal)	1945	2nd term
Charles William Morrow	North Okanagan	Liberal	1945	2nd term
John Henry Cates	North Vancouver	Coalition (Liberal)	1945	2nd term
Herbert Anscomb	Oak Bay	Coalition (Progressive Conservative)	1933	5th term
Herbert Anscomb	Oak Bay	Progressive Conservative	1933	5th term
Robert Cecil Steele	Omineca	Coalition (Liberal)	1949	1st term
Robert Cecil Steele	Omineca	Liberal	1949	1st term
Glen Everton Braden	Peace River	Coalition (Liberal)	1937, 1949	3rd term*
Glen Everton Braden	Peace River	Liberal	1937, 1949	3rd term*
John Duncan McRae	Prince Rupert	Coalition (Liberal)	1949	1st term
John Duncan McRae	Prince Rupert	Liberal	1949	1st term
Arvid Lundell	Revelstoke	Coalition (Progressive Conservative)	1949	1st term
Arvid Lundell	Revelstoke	Progressive Conservative	1949	1st term
Alexander Douglas Turnbull	Rossland-Trail	Coalition (Liberal)	1949	1st term
Alexander Douglas Turnbull	Rossland-Trail	Liberal	1949	1st term
Arthur James Richard Ash	Saanich	Coalition (Liberal)	1948	2nd term
Arthur James Richard Ash	Saanich	Liberal	1948	2nd term
Arthur Brown Ritchie	Salmon Arm	Coalition (Progressive Conservative)	1945	2nd term
Arthur Brown Ritchie	Salmon Arm	Progressive Conservative	1945	2nd term
Maurice Patrick Finnerty	Similkameen	Coalition (Liberal)	1949	1st term
Maurice Patrick Finnerty	Similkameen	Liberal	1949	1st term
Edward Tourtellotte Kenney	Skeena	Coalition (Liberal)	1933	5th term
Edward Tourtellotte Kenney	Skeena	Liberal	1933	5th term
William Andrew Cecil Bennett	South Okanagan	Coalition (Progressive Conservative)	1941, 1949	3rd term*
William Andrew Cecil Bennett	South Okanagan	Independent	1941, 1949	3rd term*
William Andrew Cecil Bennett	South Okanagan	Social Credit	1941, 1949	3rd term*
Donald Cameron Brown	Vancouver-Burrard	Coalition (Progressive Conservative)	1945	2nd term
Donald Cameron Brown	Vancouver-Burrard	Progressive Conservative	1945	2nd term
John Groves Gould	Vancouver-Burrard	Coalition (Liberal)	1949	1st term
John Groves Gould	Vancouver-Burrard	Liberal	1949	1st term
Allan James McDonell	Vancouver Centre	Coalition (Progressive Conservative)	1945	2nd term
Allan James McDonell	Vancouver Centre	Progressive Conservative	1945	2nd term
Gordon Sylvester Wismer	Vancouver Centre	Coalition (Liberal)	1933, 1945	4th term*
Gordon Sylvester Wismer	Vancouver Centre	Liberal	1933, 1945	4th term*
Arthur James Turner	Vancouver East	CCF	1941	3rd term
Harold Edward Winch	Vancouver East	CCF	1933	5th term
Albert Reginald MacDougall	Vancouver-Point Grey	Coalition (Progressive Conservative)	1946	2nd term
Albert Reginald MacDougall	Vancouver-Point Grey	Progressive Conservative	1946	2nd term
Tilly Jean Rolston	Vancouver-Point Grey	Coalition (Progressive Conservative)	1941	3rd term
Tilly Jean Rolston	Vancouver-Point Grey	Independent	1941	3rd term
Tilly Jean Rolston	Vancouver-Point Grey	Social Credit	1941	3rd term
Leigh Forbes Stevenson	Vancouver-Point Grey	Coalition (Progressive Conservative)	1946	2nd term
Leigh Forbes Stevenson	Vancouver-Point Grey	Progressive Conservative	1946	2nd term
Nancy Hodges	Victoria City	Coalition (Liberal)	1941	3rd term
Nancy Hodges	Victoria City	Liberal	1941	3rd term
Daniel John Proudfoot	Victoria City	Coalition (Liberal)	1949	1st term
Daniel John Proudfoot	Victoria City	Liberal	1949	1st term
William Thomas Straith	Victoria City	Coalition (Liberal)	1937	4th term
William Thomas Straith	Victoria City	Liberal	1937	4th term
John Joseph Alban Gillis	Yale	Coalition (Liberal)	1928	6th term
John Joseph Alban Gillis	Yale	Liberal	1928	6th term

== Party standings ==
Affiliation	Members
Liberal-Conservative coalition	39
Co-operative Commonwealth	7
Independent	1
Labour	1
Total	48
Government Majority	30

== By-elections ==
By-elections were held to replace members for various reasons:

Electoral district	Member elected	Party	Election date	Reason
Esquimalt	Frank Mitchell	CCF	October 1, 1951	C.T. Beard died November 21, 1950

== Other changes ==
- James Mowat joins the Coalition in February 1950.
- W.A.C. Bennett resigns from the Coalition to become an independent on March 15, 1951. He joins the Social Credit League in December but continues to sit as an independent.
- Tilly Rolston resigns from the Coalition to become an independent on March 29, 1951.
- The Coalition between the Liberals and Progressive Conservatives collapses on January 19, 1952. Herbert Anscomb, Leslie Harvey Eyres, Roderick Charles MacDonald, Alexander Campbell Hope, Arvid Lundell, Ernest Crawford Carson, Arthur Brown Ritchie, Allan James McDonell, Leigh Forbes Stevenson, Donald Cameron Brown and Albert Reginald MacDougall move to the opposition as Progressive Conservatives.
- John Henry Cates, Battleman Milton MacIntyre and Herbert John Welch retain the Coalition designation and continue to support the Johnson Government.
- The remaining 23 Coalition MLAs continue to sit as Liberals.
