= Hart ministry =

Cabinet of British Columbia, 1941–1947

- 23rd ministry of British Columbia
- Date formed: December 9, 1941
- Date dissolved: December 29, 1947

People and organisations
- Monarch: George VI
- Lieutenant Governor: William Culham Woodward (1941–1946)); Charles Arthur Banks (1946–1947)
- Premier: John Hart
- Coalition partner: Royal Maitland (until 1946); Herbert Anscomb (after 1946)
- Member parties: █ Liberal; █ Conservative (Note: The Conservative Party changed its name to the Progressive Conservative Party in 1942.)
- Status in legislature: Majority (coalition)
- Opposition party: Co-Operative Commonwealth Federation
- Opposition leader: Harold Winch

History
- Election: 1945
- Legislature terms: 20th Parliament of British Columbia; 21st Parliament of British Columbia
- Predecessor: Pattullo ministry
- Successor: Johnson ministry

The Hart ministry, also known as the Hart–Maitland coalition (1941–1946) and Hart–Anscomb coalition (1946–1947), was the combined Cabinet (formally the Executive Council of British Columbia) that governed British Columbia from December 9, 1941, to December 29, 1947. It was led by John Hart, the 23rd premier of British Columbia, and was a coalition government that comprised members of both the Liberal Party and Conservative Party.

The Hart ministry was established shortly after the 1941 election. The incumbent Pattullo ministry, a single-party Liberal government, lost its majority in the Legislature, but Premier Duff Pattullo resisted calls to form a coalition. In response, Liberal delegates voted to establish a coalition government, and elected John Hart, who supported a coalition, as their new leader. The next day, Pattullo announced his resignation as premier, and Hart invited Royal Maitland, the Conservative leader, to join his government. The Pattullo ministry was thus replaced by the Hart ministry on December 9, 1941.

The Hart ministry governed through all of the 20th Parliament of British Columbia and, following its re-election in the 1945 election, continued into the 21st Parliament of British Columbia. On October 2, 1947, Hart announced his intention to retire. It was succeeded by the Johnson ministry on December 29, 1947.

== List of ministers ==
Hart ministry by portfolio
Portfolio	Minister	Tenure		Party
Portfolio	Minister	Start	End	Party
Premier of British Columbia	John Hart	December 9, 1941	December 29, 1947	█ Liberal
Minister of Agriculture	Kenneth Cattanach MacDonald	December 10, 1941	November 19, 1945	█ Liberal
Minister of Agriculture	Frank Putnam	November 19, 1945	December 29, 1947	█ Liberal
Attorney General	Royal Maitland	December 10, 1941	March 28, 1946	█ Conservative
Attorney General	Gordon Sylvester Wismer	March 28, 1946	December 29, 1947	█ Liberal
Minister of Education	Henry George Thomas Perry	December 10, 1941	November 19, 1945	█ Liberal
Minister of Education	George Moir Weir	November 19, 1945	December 29, 1947	█ Liberal
Minister of Finance	John Hart	December 10, 1941	April 12, 1946	█ Liberal
Minister of Finance	Herbert Anscomb	April 12, 1946	December 29, 1947	█ Conservative
Minister of Fisheries	Leslie Harvey Eyres	April 17, 1947	December 29, 1947	█ Conservative
Minister of Health and Welfare	George Sharratt Pearson	October 1, 1946	December 29, 1947	█ Liberal
Minister of Labour	George Sharratt Pearson	December 10, 1941	October 16, 1947	█ Liberal
Minister of Labour	Gordon Sylvester Wismer	October 16, 1947	December 29, 1947	█ Liberal
Minister of Lands and Forests (Note: "Lands" from December 19, 1941 to April 5, 1945)	Wells Gray	December 10, 1941	May 7, 1944	█ Liberal
Minister of Lands and Forests	John Hart	May 11, 1944	November 8, 1944	█ Liberal
Minister of Lands and Forests	Edward Tourtellotte Kenney	November 8, 1944	December 29, 1947	█ Liberal
Minister of Mines	Herbert Anscomb	December 10, 1941	October 28, 1942	█ Conservative
Minister of Mines	Ernest Crawford Carson	October 28, 1942	April 12, 1946	█ Conservative
Minister of Mines	Roderick Charles MacDonald	April 12, 1946	December 29, 1947	█ Conservative
Minister of Municipal Affairs	Wells Gray	December 10, 1941	May 7, 1944	█ Liberal
Minister of Municipal Affairs	Herbert Anscomb	May 11, 1944	April 12, 1946	█ Conservative
Minister of Municipal Affairs	Roderick Charles MacDonald	April 12, 1946	December 29, 1947	█ Conservative
Provincial Secretary	George Sharratt Pearson	December 10, 1941	December 29, 1947	█ Liberal
Minister of Public Works	Rolf Wallgren Bruhn	December 10, 1941	August 30, 1942	█ Conservative
Minister of Public Works	John Hart	September 4, 1942	September 15, 1942	█ Liberal
Minister of Public Works	Herbert Anscomb	September 15, 1942	April 12, 1946	█ Conservative
Minister of Public Works	Leslie Harvey Eyres	April 12, 1946	December 29, 1947	█ Conservative
Minister of Railways	Rolf Wallgren Bruhn	December 10, 1941	August 30, 1942	█ Conservative
Minister of Railways	John Hart	September 4, 1942	September 15, 1942	█ Liberal
Minister of Railways	Herbert Anscomb	September 15, 1942	April 12, 1946	█ Conservative
Minister of Railways	Ernest Crawford Carson	April 12, 1946	December 29, 1947	█ Conservative
Minister of Trade and Industry	Herbert Anscomb	December 10, 1941	October 28, 1942	█ Conservative
Minister of Trade and Industry	Ernest Crawford Carson	October 28, 1942	April 12, 1946	█ Conservative
Minister of Trade and Industry	Leslie Harvey Eyres	April 12, 1946	December 29, 1947	█ Conservative

== Cabinet shuffles ==
On August 30, 1942, Rolf Wallgren Bruhn, the Minister of Public Works and Minister of Railways, died in office. Hart temporarily took responsibility for the portfolios until Herbert Anscomb was sworn in as the new minister on September 15. Anscomb held the portfolios in conjunction with his prior role as Minister of Mines and Minister of Trade and Industry until October 28, when Ernest Crawford Carson was appointed to cabinet for the latter two.

On May 7, 1944, longtime minister Wells Gray died. Anscomb took responsibility for the municipal affairs portfolio, while Hart took lands and forests; the two had already been acting ministers for the portfolios during Gray's illness. On November 8, Hart passed the lands portfolio to new cabinet minister Edward Tourtellotte Kenney.

On November 16, 1945, Henry George Thomas Perry resigned as Minister of Education; he was succeeded by George Weir on November 19. Also on November 19, agriculture minister K. C. MacDonald died. Frank Putnam was sworn in as the new agriculture minister on November 21. Putnam had previously been agriculture minister in the short-lived minority government of the Pattullo ministry.

On March 28, 1946, Royal Maitland, Attorney General and leader of the Conservative Party, died unexpectedly. Selecting a replacement was a difficult task: the coalition agreement had ensured the attorney general post would be given to a Conservative, but no Tory MLAs were lawyers. Moreover, if the new party leader would not be named attorney general, then they would be entitled to another high-ranking ministry, necessitating a shuffle. One suggestion was to recruit Howard Green, the MP for Vancouver South, as Conservative leader and attorney general. Ultimately, Hart appointed Gordon Sylvester Wismer, a Liberal, as the new attorney general, but pledged to increase the size of cabinet and appoint two more Conservatives. On April 12, Hart reorganized his cabinet accordingly, bringing Leslie Harvey Eyres and Roderick Charles MacDonald, both Conservatives, to cabinet. Hart also relinquished the finance ministry, which he had held for much of the last 13 years, to Anscomb, who had become the new Conservative leader; Carson, in turn, took over Anscomb's previous portfolio of public works.

== New ministries ==
On February 21, 1946, the government announced plans to establish a Department of Health; until then, health policy had been the purview of the Provincial Secretary. The Department of Health and Welfare was formally established on October 1, 1946, with George Sharratt Pearson as its inaugural minister.

On February 15, 1947, the government announced plans to establish an independent Department of Fisheries. Previously, fisheries were the responsibility of the Department of Trade and Industry, overseen by the Commissioner of Fisheries; the reorganization saw the commissioner named deputy minister of the new department and the incumbent Minister of Trade and Industry, Leslie Harvey Eyres, given the additional role as Minister of Fisheries. Officials believed the new department would "dignify" the industry, as every other province had a fisheries minister. However, opposition leader Harold Winch criticized the plan as something "just to give [Eyres] another ministry". Eyres was sworn in as the minister on April 17, 1947.
