= Pattullo ministry =

Cabinet of British Columbia, 1933–1941

- 22nd ministry of British Columbia
- Date formed: November 15, 1933
- Date dissolved: December 9, 1941

People and organisations
- Monarch: George V (1933–1936); Edward VIII (1936); George VI (1936–1941)
- Lieutenant Governor: John William Fordham Johnson (1933–1936); Eric Hamber (1936–1941); William Culham Woodward (1941))
- Premier: Duff Pattullo
- Member parties: Liberal Party
- Status in legislature: Majority (1933–1941); Minority (1941)
- Opposition party: Co-Operative Commonwealth Federation (1933–1936); Social Constructive Party (1936–1937); Conservative Party (1937–1941); Co-Operative Commonwealth Federation (1941)
- Opposition leader: Robert Connell (1933–1937); Frank Porter Patterson (1937–1938); Royal Lethington Maitland (1938–1941); Harold Winch (1941)

History
- Elections: 1933, 1937, 1941
- Legislature terms: 18th Parliament of British Columbia; 19th Parliament of British Columbia; 20th Parliament of British Columbia
- Predecessor: Tolmie ministry
- Successor: Hart ministry

The Pattullo ministry was the combined Cabinet (formally the Executive Council of British Columbia) that governed British Columbia from November 15, 1933, to December 9, 1941. It was led by Duff Pattullo, the 22nd premier of British Columbia, and was composed of members of the Liberal Party.

The Pattullo ministry was established following the 1933 election, in which the Liberal Party won a majority government. It governed for the entirety of the 18th Parliament of British Columbia and, after re-election in the 1937 election, the entirety of the 19th Parliament of British Columbia as well.

After the 1941 election, the Liberal Party lost its majority in the Legislature. Pattullo faced calls to form a coalition government with the Conservative Party, including from within his own party, but opted instead to form a minority government. His new cabinet was sworn in on November 14. However, at the party's annual convention on December 3, delegates voted to establish a coalition government. Pattullo then resigned, and the convention elected John Hart, who endorsed a coalition, as leader. The next day, Pattullo announced his resignation as premier, and Hart invited Royal Maitland, the Conservative leader, to join a coalition. The Pattullo ministry was thus disestablished and replaced by the Hart ministry on December 9, 1941.

== List of ministers ==
Pattullo ministry by portfolio
Portfolio	Minister	Tenure	
Portfolio	Minister	Start	End
Premier of British Columbia	Duff Pattullo	November 15, 1933	December 9, 1941
Minister of Agriculture	Kenneth Cattanach MacDonald	November 15, 1933	November 25, 1941
Minister of Agriculture	Frank Putnam	November 26, 1941	December 9, 1941
Attorney General	Gordon McGregor Sloan	November 15, 1933	April 5, 1937
Attorney General	Duff Pattullo	April 5, 1937	July 5, 1937
Attorney General	Gordon Sylvester Wismer	July 5, 1937	November 14, 1941
Attorney General	Norman William Whittaker	November 14, 1941	November 19, 1941
Attorney General	Duff Pattullo	November 24, 1941	December 9, 1941
Minister of Education	George Moir Weir	November 15, 1933	November 18, 1941
Minister of Education	Duff Pattullo	November 18, 1941	December 9, 1941
Minister of Finance	John Hart	November 15, 1933	November 17, 1941
Minister of Finance	Duff Pattullo	November 18, 1941	December 9, 1941
Minister of Labour	George Sharratt Pearson	November 15, 1933	November 14, 1941
Minister of Labour	William James Asselstine	November 14, 1941	December 9, 1941
Minister of Lands	Wells Gray	November 15, 1933	December 9, 1941
Minister of Mines	George Sharratt Pearson	November 15, 1933	December 23, 1937
Minister of Mines	William James Asselstine	December 23, 1937	November 14, 1941
Minister of Mines	Charles Sidney Leary	November 14, 1941	December 9, 1941
Minister of Municipal Affairs	Wells Gray	March 31, 1934	December 9, 1941
Provincial Secretary	George Moir Weir	November 15, 1933	November 17, 1941
Provincial Secretary	Wells Gray	November 18, 1941	December 9, 1941
Minister of Public Works	Frank Mitchell MacPherson	November 15, 1933	September 27, 1939
Minister of Public Works	Duff Pattullo	September 27, 1939	December 5, 1939
Minister of Public Works	George Sharratt Pearson	December 5, 1939	November 14, 1941
Minister of Public Works	Thomas King	November 15, 1941	December 9, 1941
Minister of Railways	Duff Pattullo	November 15, 1933	December 23, 1937
Minister of Railways	George Sharratt Pearson	December 23, 1937	December 5, 1939
Minister of Railways	Charles Sidney Leary	December 5, 1939	November 14, 1941
Minister of Railways	Thomas King	November 15, 1941	December 9, 1941
Minister of Trade and Industry (Note: "Industries" from November 15, 1933 to December 1, 1933.)	John Hart	December 1, 1933	December 10, 1937
Minister of Trade and Industry	William James Asselstine	December 23, 1937	November 14, 1941
Minister of Trade and Industry	Charles Sidney Leary	November 14, 1941	December 9, 1941

== Cabinet shuffles ==
A wave of resignations followed Pattullo's declaration of a minority government. On November 15, George Sharratt Pearson resigned from cabinet in protest. Pearson's resignation surprised Pattullo; the Vancouver Sun noted "never before had one of his cabinet gone against him so willfully". Two days later, on November 17, Finance Minister John Hart stepped down over the coalition issue as well. They were followed, on November 19, by Norman William Whittaker, who cited Hart and Pearson's resignations as evidence of Pattullo's crumbling support and authority. Finally, K. C. MacDonald announced his resignation on November 20. During this period, Pattullo took over the portfolios of education, finance and attorney general himself.

== New ministries ==
On February 20, 1934, the government announced plans to establish a separate Department of Municipal Affairs. Wells Gray was sworn in as the inaugural minister on March 31, 1934.

On September 11, 1937, Pattullo announced plans to establish a Department of Trade and Industry, amalgamating the existing Department of Industries with the BC Economic Council and Bureau of Provincial Information. William James Asselstine was named Minister of Trade and Industry as well as taking over as Minister of Mines, effectively combining administration of the two portfolios, on December 23, 1937.
