= 1937 British Columbia general election =

Canadian provincial election

- June 1, 1937

48 seats of the Legislative Assembly of British Columbia 25 seats needed for a majority
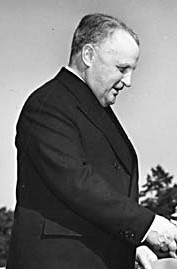
	First party	Second party	Third party
		Con	CCF
Leader	Thomas Dufferin Pattullo	Frank Porter Patterson	None (Note: CCF leader Robert Connell had been expelled from the party over doctrinal differences. Connell contested the election as leader of the British Columbia Social Constructive Party.)
Party	Liberal	Conservative	Co-operative Commonwealth
Leader since	1928	1936
Leader's seat	Prince Rupert	Dewdney
Last election	34	1 (Note: Result for the Unionist Party of British Columbia.)	7
Seats won	31	8	7
Seat change	▼3	▲7 (Note: Compared to the Unionist Party of British Columbia.)	Steady
Popular vote	156,074	119,521	119,400
Percentage	37.34%	28.60%	28.57%
Swing	▼4.40pp	▲24.55pp	▼2.96pp
Premier before election
Thomas Dufferin Pattullo
Liberal
Premier after election
Thomas Dufferin Pattullo
Liberal

The 1937 British Columbia general election was the nineteenth general election in the Province of British Columbia, Canada. It was held to elect members of the Legislative Assembly of British Columbia. The election was called on April 14, 1937, and held on June 1, 1937. The new legislature met for the first time on October 26, 1937.

The governing Liberal Party, despite winning only 37% of the popular vote, benefited from the split in the opposition vote between the Conservative Party and the Co-operative Commonwealth Federation. Liberals won a solid majority of the seats in the legislature with barely more than a third of the votes cast.

The rift in the Conservative Party that led to its decision not to nominate candidates in the 1933 election had been resolved, and the party was able to form the official opposition.

The Conservatives and CCF each won about 29% of the vote, and only 8 seats and 7 seats, respectively (they were each due about 14 based on their vote share). Two other seats were won by an independent and a Labour party candidate.

== Health insurance plebiscite ==
In 1936, the Legislature passed an Act providing for the creation of a health insurance plan for the Province. This was 26 years ahead of its introduction in Saskatchewan in 1962. The medical profession resisted its implementation to such a degree that a plebiscite was held on the same day as the election.

The question asked was, "Are you in favour of a comprehensive Health Insurance plan progressively applied?" The results were as follows:

1937 health insurance plebiscite
Type of vote	Yes	No	Total
Ordinary and absentee votes	143,218	98,946	242,164
Yes or No written on the ballot	4,613	4,687	9,300
Total	147,831	103,633	251,464
Percentage	58.79%	41.21%	100.00%
Electoral districts carried	42	6	48

Despite the majority in favour, the legislation was never brought into force, but it would not be repealed until 1973. Medicare was finally introduced after the 1967 passage of the Medical Services Act.

== Results ==
Elections to the 19th Legislative Assembly of British Columbia (1937)
Political party	Party leader	MLAs				Votes			
Political party	Party leader	Candidates	1933 (Note: Assembly was increased mid-term by the division of Columbia-Revelstoke, thus reviving the previous districts of Columbia and Revelstoke.)	1937	±	#	±	%	± (pp)
Liberal	Duff Pattullo	48	35	31	4▼	156,074	3,057▼	37.34	4.40▼
Conservative (Note: Compared to the 1933 aggregate of all Conservative factions.)	Frank Porter Patterson	43	4	8	4▲	119,521	54,278▲	28.60	11.48▲
CCF split									
█ Co-operative Commonwealth	None (Note: CCF leader Robert Connell was expelled from the party over doctrinal differences.)	46	7	7	Steady	119,400	785▼	28.57	2.96▼
█ Social Constructive	Robert Connell	14	–	–	–	8,086	8,086▲	1.93	New
Independent		11	1	1	Steady	7,341	18,317▼	1.76	4.97▼
Labour (all factions)		2	1	1	Steady	1,787	570▼	0.43	0.19▼
Social Credit League	Andrew Henry Jukes	18	–	–	–	4,812	4,812▲	1.15	New
Communist		1	–	–	–	567	567▲	0.14	New
Socialist Party of Canada		2	–	–	–	287	287▲	0.07	Returned
Financial Justice		1	–	–	–	54	54▲	0.01	New
Total		186	48	48		417,929		100.00%	
Rejected ballots						4,143	763▲		
Actual voters who voted						265,446	29,031▲	71.20%	1.87▼
Registered voters						372,781	49,241▲		

Seats and popular vote by party
Party	Seats	Votes	Change (pp)
█ Liberal	31 / 48	37.34%	-4.40
█ Conservative (all factions)	8 / 48	28.60%	11.48
█ Co-operative Commonwealth	7 / 48	28.57%	-2.96
█ Social Constructive	0 / 48	1.93%	1.93
█ Independent	1 / 48	1.76%	-4.97
█ Social Credit League	0 / 48	1.15%	1.15
█ Other	1 / 48	0.65%	-2.23

== MLAs elected ==
Alberni-Nanaimo: George Sharratt Pearson
Atlin: William James Asselstine
Burnaby: Ernest Winch
Cariboo: Louis LeBourdais
Chilliwack: Leslie Harvey Eyres
Columbia: Thomas King
Comox: Colin Cameron
Cowichan-Newcastle: Samuel Guthrie
Cranbrook: Frank Mitchell MacPherson
Delta: Leonard Shepherd
Dewdney: Frank Porter Patterson
Esquimalt: Elmer Victor Finland
Fernie: Thomas Aubert Uphill (ILP)
Fort George: Henry George Thomas Perry
Grand Forks-Greenwood: Ezra Churchill Henniger
The Islands: MacGregor MacIntosh
Kamloops: Robert Henry Carson
Kaslo-Slocan: Charles Sidney Leary
Lillooet: George Murray
Mackenzie: John Melvin Bryan, Sr.
Nelson-Creston: Frank Putnam
New Westminster: Wells Gray
North Okanagan: Kenneth Cattanach MacDonald
North Vancouver: Dorothy Steeves
Omineca: Mark Matthew Connelly
Peace River: Glen Everton Braden
Prince Rupert: Duff Pattullo
Revelstoke: Harry Johnston
Rossland-Trail: Richard Ronald Burns
Saanich: Norman William Whittaker
Salmon Arm: Rolf Wallgren Bruhn
Similkameen: Charles H. P. Tupper
Skeena: Edward Tourtellotte Kenney
South Okanagan: Cecil Robert Bull
Vancouver-Burrard: John Howard Forester
Vancouver-Burrard: Helen Douglas Smith
Vancouver Centre: Fred Crone
Vancouver Centre: Gordon Sylvester Wismer
Vancouver East: James Lyle Telford
Vancouver East: Harold Winch
Vancouver-Point Grey: Royal Maitland
Vancouver-Point Grey: James Alexander Paton
Vancouver-Point Grey: George Moir Weir
Victoria City: John Hart
Victoria City: William Thomas Straith
Victoria City: Herbert Anscomb
Victoria City: Joseph Douglas Hunter
Yale: John Joseph Alban Gillis

=== Synopsis of results ===
Results by riding - 1937 British Columbia general election (single-member districts)
Riding	Winning party						Votes							
Name	1933	Party	Votes	Share	Margin #	Margin %	Lib	Con	CCF	SCP	SCL	Ind	Oth	Total
Alberni-Nanaimo	Lib	Lib	3,616	44.34%	487	5.98%	3,616	1,014	3,129 (Note: James Lyle Telford was nominated by the local CCF Club, but suspended and repudiated by provincial Executive)	397	–	–	–	8,156
Atlin	Lib	Lib	562	54.56%	299	29.03%	562	205	263	–	–	–	–	1,030
Burnaby	CCF	CCF	5,908	44.03%	2,529	18.85%	3,379	2,307	5,908	644	136	1,073	–	13,417
Cariboo	Lib	Lib	1,921	74.57%	1,266	49.14%	1,921	–	–	–	–	655	–	2,576
Chilliwack	Lib	Con	2,524	40.08%	304	4.83%	2,220	2,524	1,554	–	–	–	–	6,298
Columbia	Lib	Lib	921	57.06%	550	34.07%	921	371	322	–	–	–	–	1,614
Comox	Lib	CCF	2,336	44.83%	460	8.83%	1,876	999	2,336	–	–	–	–	5,211
Cowichan-Newcastle	OG	CCF	1,560	33.58%	336	7.23%	1,224	639	1,560	–	–	1,222	–	4,645
Cranbrook	Lib	Lib	3,110	76.73%	2,167	53.46%	3,110	–	943	–	–	–	–	4,053
Delta	CCF	CCF	3,192	32.93%	90	0.92%	3,102	2,815	3,192	583	–	–	–	9,692
Dewdney	Lib	Con	1,870	39.27%	252	5.29%	1,618	1,870	1,274	–	–	–	–	4,762
Esquimalt	Un	Con	1,642	41.60%	226	5.72%	1,416	1,642	765	–	57	67	–	3,947
Fernie	ILP	ILP	1,701	53.64%	231	7.28%	1,470	–	–	–	–	–	1,701	3,171
Fort George	Lib	Lib	1,493	51.54%	323	11.15%	1,493	234	1,170	–	–	–	–	2,897
Grand Forks-Greenwood	Lib	Lib	722	41.93%	19	1.11%	722	703	164	133	–	–	–	1,722
The Islands	Lib	Con	953	45.12%	259	12.26%	694	953	414	–	51	–	–	2,112
Kamloops	Lib	Lib	1,786	38.89%	325	7.07%	1,786	1,461	1,345	–	–	–	–	4,592
Kaslo-Slocan	Lib	Lib	1,064	38.86%	135	4.93%	1,064	715	929	–	30	–	–	2,738
Lillooet	Lib	Lib	1,176	39.78%	251	8.49%	1,176	925	855	–	–	–	–	2,956
Mackenzie	CCF	Lib	1,828	33.93%	167	3.10%	1,828	1,661	1,625	152	122	–	–	5,388
Nelson-Creston	Lib	Lib	2,149	39.17%	248	4.52%	2,149	1,901	1,121	–	177	139	–	5,487
New Westminster	Lib	Lib	4,055	52.02%	2,289	29.36%	4,055	1,766	1,321	–	–	–	653	7,795
North Okanagan	Lib	Lib	2,689	52.64%	970	18.99%	2,689	1,719	700	–	–	–	–	5,108
North Vancouver	CCF	CCF	2,749	32.23%	363	4.25%	1,847	1,522	2,749	–	–	2,411 (Note: Joseph Bentley Leyland, Reeve of West Vancouver and a driving force behind the construction of the Lions Gate Bridge, came in second with 2,386 votes.)	–	8,529
Omineca	Lib	Lib	1,013	50.90%	230	11.55%	1,013	194	783	–	–	–	–	1,990
Peace River	NP	Lib	1,168	42.61%	263	9.59%	1,168	434	905	–	–	234	–	2,741
Prince Rupert	Lib	Lib	1,446	49.55%	650	22.27%	1,446	662	796	–	14	–	–	2,918
Revelstoke	Lib	Lib	1,162	61.16%	629	33.11%	1,162	533	205	–	–	–	–	1,900
Rossland-Trail	Lib	Lib	1,877	46.70%	626	15.57%	1,877	1,251	891	–	–	–	–	4,019
Saanich	Lib	Lib	2,106	36.14%	447	7.67%	2,106	1,659	1,531	224	271	37	–	5,828
Salmon Arm	NP	Ind	1,533	48.33%	649	20.46%	884	–	755	–	–	1,533 (Note: supported and endorsed by SCP)	–	3,172
Similkameen	Lib	Lib	2,266	43.55%	136	2.61%	2,266	2,130	807	–	–	–	–	5,203
Skeena	Lib	Lib	1,006	59.74%	328	19.48%	1,006	–	678	–	–	–	–	1,684
South Okanagan	Lib	Lib	2,388	45.02%	287	5.41%	2,388	2,101	815	–	–	–	–	5,304
Yale	Lib	Lib	968	59.94%	546	33.81%	968	225	422	–	–	–	–	1,615

= open seat
= winning candidate was in previous Legislature
= incumbent had switched allegiance
= previously incumbent in another riding
= not incumbent; was previously elected to the Legislature
= incumbency arose from byelection gain
= other incumbents renominated
= multiple candidates

Results by riding - 1937 British Columbia general election (multiple-member districts)
Riding		Winning party		Votes							
Name	MLAs	1933	1937	Lib	Con	CCF	SCP	SCL	Ind	Oth	Total
Vancouver-Burrard	2	2	2	16,903	13,503	14,423	765	581	–	54	46,229
Vancouver Centre	2	2	2	12,821	8,261	11,461	891	922	–	234	34,590
Vancouver East	2	2	2	10,314	5,914	23,102	1,146	389	–	53	40,918
Vancouver-Point Grey	3	3	2 1	27,243	29,134	18,589	–	1,001	–	–	75,967
Victoria City	4	2 1 1	2 2	26,571	25,574	9,598	3,151	1,061	–	–	65,955

== See also ==
- List of British Columbia political parties
