= 1941 British Columbia general election =

Canadian provincial election

- October 21, 1941

48 seats of the Legislative Assembly of British Columbia 25 seats needed for a majority
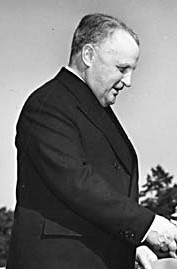

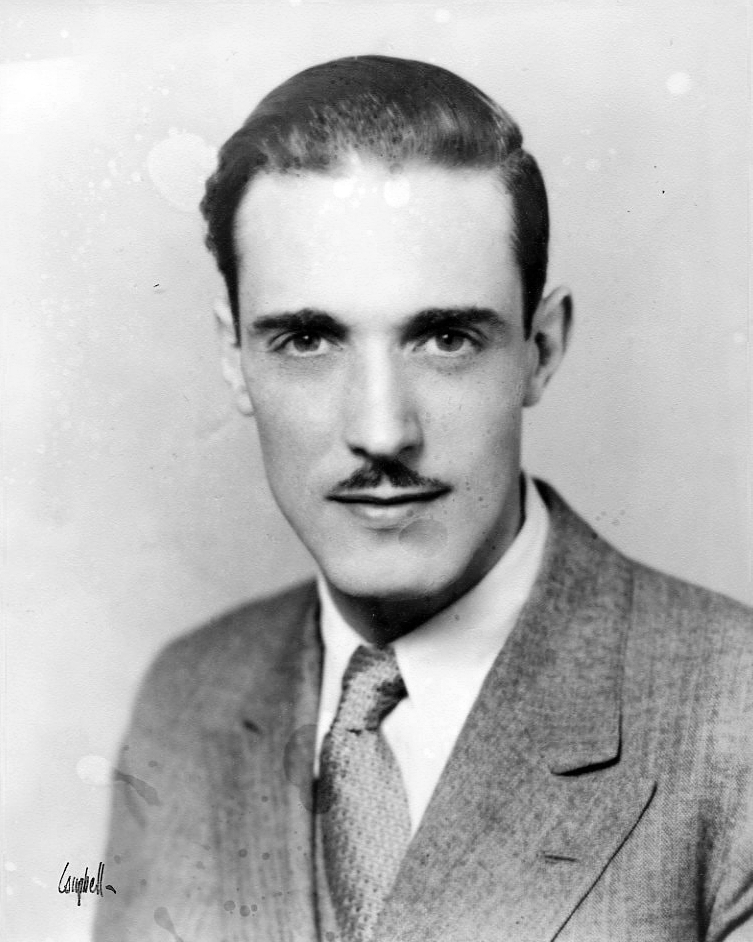

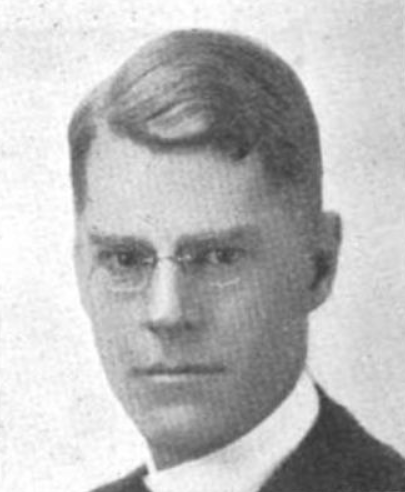
	First party	Second party	Third party
Leader	Duff Pattullo (Note: Pattullo led the Liberals during the election, but was replaced as leader by John Hart on December 9, 1941, after refusing to enter into a coalition with the Conservatives.)	Harold Winch	Royal Maitland
Party	Liberal	Co-operative Commonwealth	Conservative
Leader since	1928	1938	1938
Leader's seat	Victoria City	Vancouver East	Vancouver-Point Grey
Last election	31	7	8
Seats won	21	14	12
Seat change	▼10	▲7	▲4
Popular vote	149,525	151,440	140,282
Percentage	32.94%	33.36%	30.91%
Swing	▼4.40pp	▲4.79pp	▲2.31pp
Premier before election
Duff Pattullo
Liberal
Premier after election
John Hart
Coalition

The 1941 British Columbia general election was the twentieth general election in the Province of British Columbia, Canada. It was held to elect members of the Legislative Assembly of British Columbia. The election was called on September 9, 1941, and held on October 21, 1941.

No party took a majority of votes, and no party took a majority of seats. After the election, Conservative and Liberal members voted to form a Coalition government. Liberal Party leader Thomas Dufferin Pattullo objected, stepped down as leader and sat as a Liberal separate from the Coalition. This reduced the Coalition caucus to thirty two MLAs.

== 1938 redistribution of ridings ==
An Act was passed in 1938 providing for a rearrangement of certain seats in the Assembly, maintaining the total at 48, upon the next election. The following changes were made:

Abolished ridings	New ridings
Reorganization of districts
Alberni-Nanaimo; The Islands	Alberni; Nanaimo and the Islands
Division of district
Victoria City (4 MLAs)	Oak Bay; Victoria City (3 MLAs)

== Results ==
Elections to the 20th Legislative Assembly of British Columbia (1941)
Political party	Party leader	MLAs				Votes			
Political party	Party leader	Candidates	1937	1941	±	#	±	%	± (pp)
Coalition									
█ Liberal	John Hart (Note: Duff Pattullo stepped aside as party leader and Premier, after refusing to participate in the formation of the Coalition. He would remain as a Liberal outside that group as MLA for Prince Rupert. 1941 Liberal numbers are adjusted to reflect the departure.)	47	31	20	11▼	147,844	8,230▼	32.57	4.77▼
█ Conservative	Royal Maitland	43	8	12	4▲	140,282	20,761▲	30.91	2.31▲
Coalition total				32	7▼	288,126	12,531▲	63.48	2.46▼
Co-operative Commonwealth	Harold Winch	45	7	14	7▲	151,440	32,040▲	33.36	4.79▲
Liberal	Duff Pattullo	1	–	1	1▲	1,681	1,681▲	0.37	Not part of Coalition
Labour (all factions)		6	1	1	Steady	7,141	5,354▲	1.57	1.14▲
Official Conservative (Note: Joshua Hinchcliffe was nominated by the North Vancouver Conservative Association, but when he disagreed with the party's road policy, he was repudiated by Maitland. A group called the Conservative Active Club nominated A. H. Bayne who received the party's support. Bayne, however, could not run as a Conservative since Hinchcliffe's nomination papers had already been filed.)		1	–	–	–	2,161	2,161▲	0.48	New
Independent		4	1	–	1▼	1,638	5,703▼	0.36	1.40▼
Socialist Labor		4	–	–	–	683	683▲	0.15	New
Independent Farmer		1	–	–	–	388	388▲	0.09	New
Emancipation		1	–	–	–	265	265▲	0.06	New
Victory Without Debt		1	–	–	–	209	209▲	0.05	New
Religious Political Brotherhood		1	–	–	–	105	105▲	0.02	New
Independent Socialist		1	–	–	–	56	56▲	0.01	Returned
Total		156	48	48		453,893		100.00%	
Rejected ballots						4,797	654▲		
Actual voters who voted						303,901	38,455▲	72.73%	1.53▲
Registered voters						417,839	45,058▲		

Seats and popular vote by party
Party	Seats	Votes	Change (pp)
█ Coalition	32 / 48	63.48%	-2.46
█ Co-operative Commonwealth	14 / 48	33.36%	4.79
█ Social Constructive	0 / 48	0%	-1.93
█ Social Credit League	0 / 48	0%	-1.15
█ Other	2 / 48	3.16%	0.75

== MLAs elected ==
Alberni: James Mowat
Atlin: William James Asselstine
Burnaby: Ernest Winch
Cariboo: Louis LeBourdais
Chilliwack: Leslie Harvey Eyres
Columbia: Thomas King
Comox: Colin Cameron
Cowichan-Newcastle: Samuel Guthrie
Cranbrook: Frank William Green
Delta: Leonard Shepherd
Dewdney: Roderick Charles MacDonald
Esquimalt: Elmer Victor Finland
Fernie: Thomas Aubert Uphill (ILP)
Fort George: Henry George Thomas Perry
Grand Forks-Greenwood: Thomas Alfred Love
Kamloops: Robert Henry Carson
Kaslo-Slocan: Charles Sidney Leary
Lillooet: Ernest Crawford Carson
Mackenzie: Herbert Gargrave
Nanaimo and the Islands: George Sharratt Pearson
Nelson-Creston: Frank Putnam
New Westminster: Wells Gray
North Okanagan: Kenneth Cattanach MacDonald
North Vancouver: Dorothy Steeves
Oak Bay: Herbert Anscomb
Omineca: Mark Matthew Connelly
Peace River: Glen Everton Braden
Prince Rupert: Duff Pattullo
Revelstoke: Harry Johnston
Rossland-Trail: Herbert Wilfred Herridge
Saanich: Norman William Whittaker
Salmon Arm: Rolf Wallgren Bruhn
Similkameen: Bernard George Webber
Skeena: Edward Tourtellotte Kenney
South Okanagan: W. A. C. Bennett
Vancouver-Burrard: Grace MacInnis
Vancouver-Burrard: Charles Grant MacNeil
Vancouver Centre: Laura Emma Marshall Jamieson
Vancouver Centre: Wallis Walter LeFeaux
Vancouver East: James Lyle Telford
Vancouver East: Harold Winch
Vancouver-Point Grey: Royal Maitland
Vancouver-Point Grey: James Alexander Paton
Vancouver-Point Grey: Tilly Rolston
Victoria City: John Hart
Victoria City: Nancy Hodges
Victoria City: William Thomas Straith
Yale: John J. Gillis

=== Synopsis of results ===
Results by riding - 1941 British Columbia general election (single-member districts)
Riding	Winning party						Votes					
Name	1937	Party	Votes	Share	Margin #	Margin %	Lib	Con	CCF	Ind	Oth	Total
Alberni	New	Lib	2,067	49.17%	164	3.90%	2,067	–	1,903	–	234	4,204
Atlin	Lib	Lib	454	54.83%	80	9.66%	454	–	–	–	374	828
Burnaby	CCF	CCF	6,444	49.50%	2,682	20.60%	3,762	2,707	6,444	–	105	13,018
Cariboo	Lib	Lib	1,429	50.16%	1,008	35.38%	1,429	421	338	661	–	2,849
Chilliwack	Con	Con	2,704	37.78%	60	0.84%	2,644	2,704	1,810	–	–	7,158
Columbia	Lib	Lib	648	42.66%	161	10.60%	648	384	487	–	–	1,519
Comox	CCF	CCF	3,126	45.31%	968	14.03%	2,158	1,615	3,126	–	–	6,899
Cowichan-Newcastle	CCF	CCF	2,757	47.22%	1,018	17.44%	1,739	1,343	2,757	–	–	5,839
Cranbrook	Lib	Con	1,615	35.35%	67	1.46%	1,405	1,615	1,548	–	–	4,568
Delta	CCF	CCF	5,153	42.29%	1,599	13.12%	3,554	3,478	5,153	–	–	12,185
Dewdney	Con	Con	2,995	37.13%	456	5.65%	2,532	2,995	2,539	–	–	8,066
Esquimalt	Con	Con	1,554	40.42%	206	5.36%	1,348	1,554	943	–	–	3,845
Fernie	ILP	ILP	1,719	53.39%	505	15.69%	1,214	–	287	–	1,719	3,220
Fort George	Lib	Lib	1,334	51.15%	406	15.57%	1,334	346	928	–	–	2,608
Grand Forks-Greenwood	Lib	Con	642	39.05%	5	0.30%	637	642	365	–	–	1,644
Kamloops	Lib	Lib	1,933	40.14%	221	4.59%	1,933	1,138	1,712	14	19	4,816
Kaslo-Slocan	Lib	Lib	941	42.18%	187	8.38%	941	754	536	–	–	2,231
Lillooet	Lib	Con	1,017	38.39%	176	6.64%	791	1,017	841	–	–	2,649
Mackenzie	Lib	CCF	2,909	45.75%	830	13.05%	2,079	1,370	2,909	–	–	6,358
Nanaimo and the Islands	New	Lib	2,175	43.52%	560	11.21%	2,175	1,208	1,615	–	–	4,998
Nelson-Creston	Lib	Lib	2,144	33.46%	4	0.25%	2,144	2,140	2,124	–	–	6,408
New Westminster	Lib	Lib	3,694	41.74%	1,307	14.77%	3,694	1,923	2,387	–	845	8,849
North Okanagan	Lib	Lib	2,508	42.52%	188	3.19%	2,508	2,320	1,071	–	–	5,899
North Vancouver	CCF	CCF	4,209	40.37%	1,264	12.13%	2,945 (Note: Francis Walker was previously an MLA in the Legislative Assembly of Alberta.)	1,056 (Note: Joshua Hinchcliffe had previously been an MLA for Victoria City)	4,209	–	2,217 (Note: A.H. Bayne, the Official Conservative candidate supported by the Conservative Party, received 2,161 votes)	10,427
Oak Bay	New	Con	2,676	55.88%	1,156	24.14%	1,520	2,676	593	–	–	4,789
Omineca	Lib	Lib	839	49.50%	285	16.82%	839	302	554	–	–	1,695
Peace River	Lib	Lib	1,436	51.16%	453	16.14%	1,436	–	983	–	388	2,807
Prince Rupert	Lib	Lib	1,681	51.82%	118	3.64%	1,681	–	1,563	–	–	3,244
Revelstoke	Lib	Lib	1,065	49.08%	387	17.84%	1,065	427	678	–	–	2,170
Rossland-Trail	Lib	CCF	3,621	49.40%	1,738	23.71%	1,789	1,883	3,621	–	37	7,330
Saanich	Lib	Lib	3,017	36.17%	78	0.93%	3,017	2,939	2,385	–	–	8,341
Salmon Arm	Ind	Con	1,561	60.22%	998	38.50%	468	1,561	563	–	–	2,592
Similkameen	Lib	CCF	2,601	41.16%	636	10.06%	1,965	1,753	2,601	–	–	6,319
Skeena	Lib	Lib	877	61.89%	337	23.78%	877	540	–	–	–	1,417
South Okanagan	Lib	Con	2,009	37.69%	240	4.50%	1,769	2,009	1,552	–	–	5,330
Yale	Lib	Lib	1,148	65.08%	532	30.16%	1,148	616	–	–	–	1,764

= open seat
= winning candidate was in previous Legislature
= incumbent had switched allegiance
= previously incumbent in another riding
= not incumbent; was previously elected to the Legislature
= incumbency arose from byelection gain
= other incumbents renominated
= candidate repudiated by party
= multiple candidates

Results by riding - 1941 British Columbia general election (multiple-member districts)
Riding		Winning party		Votes					
Name	MLAs	1937	1941	Lib	Con	CCF	Ind	Oth	Total
Vancouver-Burrard	2	2	2	14,781	16,564	18,998	–	267	50,610
Vancouver Centre	2	2	2	13,723	12,523	14,805	–	602	41,653
Vancouver East	2	2	2	9,495	7,332	23,328	–	3,936	44,091
Vancouver-Point Grey	3	2 1	3	29,046	42,400	23,448	–	265	95,159
Victoria City	3	2 2	3	18,771	14,027	9,736	963	–	43,497

== See also ==
- List of British Columbia political parties

== Sources ==
- Electoral History of British Columbia, 1871–1986 (PDF). Elections BC. 1988. ISBN 0-7718-8677-2.
