= Boss Johnson ministry =

Cabinet of British Columbia, 1947–1952

Johnson ministry
- 24th ministry of British Columbia
- Date formed: December 29, 1947
- Date dissolved: August 1, 1952

People and organisations
- Monarch: George VI (1947–1952); Elizabeth II (1952)
- Lieutenant Governor: Charles Arthur Banks (1946–1950); Clarence Wallace (1950–1952)
- Premier: Boss Johnson
- Coalition partner: Herbert Anscomb (until January 1952)
- Member parties: █ Liberal; █ Progressive Conservative (1947–1952)
- Status in legislature: Majority (coalition; 1947–1952); Minority (1952)
- Opposition party: Co-Operative Commonwealth Federation (1947–1952); Progressive Conservative Party (1952)
- Opposition leader: Harold Winch (1947–1952); Herbert Anscomb (1952)

History
- Incoming formation: 1947 Liberal leadership convention
- Outgoing formation: 1952 general election
- Election: 1949
- Legislature terms: 21st Parliament of British Columbia; 22nd Parliament of British Columbia
- Predecessor: Hart ministry
- Successor: W. A. C. Bennett ministry

The Johnson ministry was the combined Cabinet (formally the Executive Council of British Columbia) that governed British Columbia from December 29, 1947, to August 1, 1952. It was led by Boss Johnson, the 24th premier of British Columbia, and was a coalition government that comprised members of both the Liberal Party and Progressive Conservative Party.

The Johnson ministry was established part-way through the 21st Parliament of British Columbia, after John Hart resigned as premier and leader of the Liberal Party. Johnson was elected as the Liberal Party's new leader at the party's 1947 convention, and outgoing premier Hart pledged to recommend Johnson to the lieutenant governor of British Columbia to be the province's next premier. However, the Hart ministry had been a coalition between the Liberal and Conservative parties, and in the immediate aftermath of Johnson's leadership victory, it was uncertain if the two parties would renew their coalition arrangement. Johnson and Herbert Anscomb, leader of the Conservatives, agreed to continue the coalition on December 27, 1947. The new cabinet, comprising six Liberals and four Conservatives, was sworn in two days later.

The cabinet governed through the remainder of the 21st Parliament and, following the 1949 election, into the 22nd Parliament. On January 18, 1952, the Progressive Conservatives left the coalition and moved to the opposition benches, becoming the Official Opposition. For the last six months of the 22nd Parliament, the Johnson ministry continued as a minority government, consisting only of Liberal ministers but supported by a few independent members. After the 1952 election, it was replaced by the W. A. C. Bennett ministry.

The Johnson ministry was the last time the Liberals formed government until the Campbell ministry in 2001. It is also the most recent coalition government in the province and the last time the Conservatives formed government until the Doerkson ministry in 2026.

== List of ministers ==
Johnson ministry by portfolio
Portfolio	Minister	Tenure		Party
Portfolio	Minister	Start	End	Party
Premier of British Columbia	Boss Johnson	December 29, 1947	August 1, 1952	█ Liberal
Attorney General	Gordon Sylvester Wismer	December 29, 1947	August 1, 1952	█ Liberal
Minister of Agriculture	Frank Putnam	December 29, 1947	July 21, 1949	█ Liberal
Minister of Agriculture	Henry Robson Bowman	July 21, 1949	August 1, 1952	█ Liberal
Minister of Education	William Thomas Straith	December 29, 1947	August 1, 1952	█ Liberal
Minister of Finance	Herbert Anscomb	December 29, 1947	January 19, 1952	█ Progressive Conservative
Minister of Finance	Boss Johnson	January 19, 1952	August 1, 1952	█ Liberal
Minister of Fisheries	Leslie Harvey Eyres	December 29, 1947	January 19, 1952	█ Progressive Conservative
Minister of Fisheries	Henry Robson Bowman	January 19, 1952	August 1, 1952	█ Liberal
Minister of Health and Welfare	George Sharratt Pearson	December 29, 1947	May 3, 1950	█ Liberal
Minister of Health and Welfare	Alexander Douglas Turnbull	May 3, 1950	August 1, 1952	█ Liberal
Minister of Labour	Gordon Sylvester Wismer	December 29, 1947	July 21, 1949	█ Liberal
Minister of Labour	John Henry Cates	July 21, 1949	August 1, 1952	█ Liberal
Minister of Lands and Forests	Edward Tourtellotte Kenney	December 29, 1947	August 1, 1952	█ Liberal
Minister of Mines	Roderick Charles MacDonald	December 29, 1947	January 19, 1952	█ Progressive Conservative
Minister of Mines	John Henry Cates	January 19, 1952	August 1, 1952	█ Liberal
Minister of Municipal Affairs	Roderick Charles MacDonald	December 29, 1947	January 19, 1952	█ Progressive Conservative
Minister of Municipal Affairs	Alexander Douglas Turnbull	January 19, 1952	August 1, 1952	█ Liberal
Provincial Secretary	George Sharratt Pearson	December 29, 1947	May 3, 1950	█ Liberal
Provincial Secretary	William Thomas Straith	May 3, 1950	August 1, 1952	█ Liberal
Minister of Public Works	Ernest Crawford Carson	December 29, 1947	January 19, 1952	█ Progressive Conservative
Minister of Public Works	Edward Tourtellotte Kenney	January 19, 1952	August 1, 1952	█ Liberal
Minister of Railways	Leslie Harvey Eyres	December 29, 1947	January 19, 1952	█ Progressive Conservative
Minister of Railways	Henry Robson Bowman	January 19, 1952	August 1, 1952	█ Liberal
Minister of Trade and Industry	Leslie Harvey Eyres	December 29, 1947	January 19, 1952	█ Progressive Conservative
Minister of Trade and Industry	Henry Robson Bowman	January 19, 1952	August 1, 1952	█ Liberal
