= Bob Browne-Clayton =

Canadian politician (1917–2003)

Member of the Legislative Assembly of British Columbia
- In office 1948–1949
- Preceded by: W. A. C. Bennett
- Succeeded by: W. A. C. Bennett
- Constituency: South Okanagan

Personal details
- Born: June 24, 1917 Oxfordshire, England
- Died: September 5, 2003 (aged 86) Kelowna, British Columbia
- Party: Coalition
- Spouse: Patricia Evelyn Leila Acland
- Children: 3
- Occupation: farmer

Robert Denis Browne-Clayton (June 24, 1917 – September 5, 2003) was a Canadian politician. He served in the Legislative Assembly of British Columbia from a November 1948 byelection until the Legislature was dissolved in April 1949, from the electoral district of South Okanagan, a member of the Coalition government. He never did run again in a provincial election.
