= Arthur James Richard Ash =

Canadian politician (1906–1988)

Member of the Legislative Assembly of British Columbia
- In office 1948–1952
- Preceded by: Norman William Whittaker
- Constituency: Saanich

Personal details
- Born: September 30, 1906 Brandon, Manitoba, Canada
- Died: 1988 (aged 81–82) Victoria, British Columbia, Canada
- Party: British Columbia Liberal Party
- Spouse: Vera Marie Carnie
- Occupation: lieutenant

Arthur James Richard Ash (September 30, 1906 – January 15, 1988) was a merchant and political figure in British Columbia. He represented Saanich in the Legislative Assembly of British Columbia from 1948 to 1952 as a Liberal.

He was born in Brandon, Manitoba, the son of W.H. Ash and Catherine McDonald, and was educated in Ottawa. In 1934, he was named a lieutenant in the Princess Louise Dragoon Guards of Ottawa. Ash married Vera Marie Carnie in 1943. He was an alderman in Ottawa from 1934 to 1942, served during World War II and moved to Saanich, British Columbia in 1946. Ash was first elected to the assembly in a 1948 by-election held after Norman William Whittaker was named to the BC Supreme Court. He was a member of the Liberal-Conservative coalition in the provincial assembly. Ash was defeated when he ran for reelection in 1952 and again in 1953. He also served two terms as reeve of Saanich. Ash died in Victoria, at the age of 81.
