= Alberni (electoral district) =

Provincial electoral district in British Columbia, Canada

Alberni was a provincial electoral district in the Canadian province of British Columbia. It originally appeared in the 1890 election and then, after being merged into Cowichan-Alberni for the 1894 election, was renamed Alberni riding in the election of 1898. The riding lasted by that name until 1933 and 1937, when the name Alberni-Nanaimo was used. In 1941 the Alberni riding name was restored. After a redistribution, the area became part of the riding of Alberni-Qualicum.

== Electoral history ==
Note: Winners in each election are in bold.

6th 1890 British Columbia general election
Party	Candidate	Votes	%	±	Expenditures
Government	**Thomas Fletcher**	29	70.73%	–	unknown
Government	John C. Mollett	12	29.27%	–	unknown
Total valid votes		41	100.00%		
Total rejected ballots					
Turnout		%			

In the seventh general election of 1894, the Alberni riding was merged with the Cowichan riding to form Cowichan-Alberni. The separate riding names were restored for the 1898 election.

8th 1898 British Columbia general election
Party	Candidate	Votes	%	±	Expenditures
Government	George Albert Huff	70	39.33%	–	unknown
Opposition	**Alan Webster Neill**	108	60.67%	–	unknown
Total valid votes		178	100.00%		
Total rejected ballots					
Turnout		%			

9th 1900 British Columbia general election
Party	Candidate	Votes	%	±	Expenditures
Progressive	**Alan Webster Neill**	108	54.55%		
Government	James Redford	57	28.79%		
Conservative-Opposition	James Bain Thomson	33	16.67%		
Total valid votes		198	100.00%		

10th 1903 British Columbia general election
Party	Candidate	Votes	%	±	Expenditures
Conservative	Robert Hume F. Hickey	102	24.17%		unknown
Liberal	**William Wallace Burns McInnes**	**320**	**75.83%**		unknown
Total valid votes		422	100.00%		
Total rejected ballots					
Turnout		%			

11th British Columbia election, 1907
Party	Candidate	Votes	%	±	Expenditures
Liberal	**Harlan Carey Brewster**	**236**	**48.86%**		unknown
Socialist	James Cartwright	43	8.90%	–	unknown
Conservative	William Manson	204	42.24%		unknown
Total valid votes		483	100.00%		
Total rejected ballots					
Turnout		%			

12th British Columbia election, 1909
Party	Candidate	Votes	%	±	Expenditures
Liberal	**Harlan Carey Brewster**	**293**	**53.37%**		unknown
Conservative	Arthur David Morgan	256	46.63%		unknown
Total valid votes		549	100.00%		
Total rejected ballots					
Turnout		%			

13th British Columbia election, 1912
Party	Candidate	Votes	%	±	Expenditures
Conservative	**John George Corry Wood**	**Accl.**	%		unknown
Total valid votes		n/a	%		
Total rejected ballots					
Turnout		%			

14th British Columbia election, 1916
Party	Candidate	Votes	%	±	Expenditures
Liberal	**Harlan Carey Brewster**	**393**	**39.26%**		unknown
Independent	Alan Webster Neill	253	25.27%		unknown
Conservative	John George Corry Wood	355	35.46%		unknown
Total valid votes		1,001	100.00%		
Total rejected ballots					
Turnout		%			

1920 British Columbia general election
Party	Candidate	Votes	%
Independent	Richard John Burde	841	43.94
Soldier–Farmer	Noel Ernest Money	675	35.27
Liberal	Henri Evariste Langis	398	20.79
Total valid votes		1,914	100.00

16th British Columbia election, 1924
Party	Candidate	Votes	%	±	Expenditures
Independent Liberal	Richard John Burde	828	42.48%		
Conservative	James Cameron Johnstone	339	17.39%		unknown
Provincial	Charles Arthur McNaughton	782	40.13%		
Total valid votes		1,949	100.00%		

1928 British Columbia general election
Party	Candidate	Votes	%
Liberal	**Laurence Arnold Hanna**	1,208	48.71
Conservative	Percy Rushton	1,022	41.21
Independent Labour	Thomas Albert Bernard	250	10.08
Total valid votes		2,480	100.00
Total rejected ballots		34	

Alberni riding disappeared with redistribution following the 1928 election. Its successor in the 1933 and 1937 elections was Alberni-Nanaimo. For the 1941 election the Alberni riding was restored:

1941 British Columbia general election
Party	Candidate	Votes	%
Liberal	James Mowat	2,067	49.17
Co-operative Commonwealth	Thomas Albert Bernard	1,903	45.27
Independent Labour	Alex Harvey Rowan	234	5.57
Total valid votes		4,204	100.00
Total rejected ballots		56	

21st British Columbia election, 1945
Party	Candidate	Votes	%	±	Expenditures
Co-operative Commonwealth Fed.	Thomas Speakman Barnett	1,258	31.83%		unknown
Labor-Progressive	Alfred Dewhurst	559	14.14%		unknown
Coalition	**James Mowat**	**2,135**	**54.02%**	–	unknown
Total valid votes		3,952	100.00%		
Total rejected ballots		74			
Turnout		%			

22nd British Columbia election, 1949
Party	Candidate	Votes	%	±	Expenditures
Coalition	Thomas Wellington Christie	1,638	21.33%	–	unknown
Labor-Progressive	Nigel Morgan	622	8.10%		unknown
**Independent**	**James Mowat**	**3,290**	**42.84 %**		unknown
Co-operative Commonwealth Fed.	Jack Whittall	2,129	27.72%		unknown
Total valid votes		7,679	100.00%		
Total rejected ballots		200			
Turnout		%			

23rd British Columbia election, 1952
Party	Candidate	Votes 1st count	%	Votes final count	%	±%	
Conservative	Pitt Clayton	1,204	15.03%	-	%		unknown
Labor-Progressive	Alfred Dewhurst	196	2.45%	-	-.- %		
Liberal	James Mowat	2,176	27.17 %	3,030	42.77%		unknown
Social Credit League	Jack Shulz	1,366	17.06%				
**Co-operative Commonwealth Fed.**	**Stanley John Squire**	**3,067**	**38.29%**	**4,054**	**57.23%**		unknown
Total valid votes		8,009	100.00%	7,084			
Total rejected ballots		246					
Turnout		%					
^{1} Preferential ballot. First and final of four counts shown only.

24th British Columbia election, 1953
Party	Candidate	Votes 1st count	%	Votes final count	%	±%	
Labor-Progressive	Frank Wendell Bottner	139	1.92%	-	-.- %		
Liberal	Loran Kendall Jordon	2,022	27.95%	2,811	43.07%		unknown
Social Credit	Thorwald Melanchton Peterson	1,637	22.63%				
Conservative	Oliver James Ruttan	320	4.42%	-	%		
**Co-operative Commonwealth Fed.**	**Stanley John Squire**	**3,116**	**43.07%**	**3,715**	**56.93%**		unknown
Total valid votes		7,234	100.00%	6,526			
Total rejected ballots		336					
Turnout		%					
^{1} Preferential ballot. First and final of four counts shown only.

25th British Columbia election, 1956
Party	Candidate	Votes	%	±	Expenditures
Social Credit	William James Carr	1,894	28.51%	–	unknown
Liberal	Norman Leslie McKinnon	1,388	20.89%		unknown
**Co-operative Commonwealth Fed.**	**Stanley John Squire**	**3,362**	**50.60%**		unknown
Total valid votes		6,644	100.00%		
Total rejected ballots		80			
Turnout		%			

26th British Columbia election, 1960
Party	Candidate	Votes	%	±	Expenditures
Social Credit	Eric Frederick Duncan	2,966	32.65%	–	unknown
Conservative	Ronald George Lyon	514	5.66%		unknown
Liberal	John Alexander McKenzie	1,305	14.36%		unknown
Communist	Mark Fullmore Mosher	207	2.28%		unknown
**Co-operative Commonwealth Fed.**	**Stanley John Squire**	**4,093**	**45.05%**		unknown
Total valid votes		9,085	100.00%		
Total rejected ballots		315			
Turnout		%			

27th British Columbia election, 1963
Party	Candidate	Votes	%	±	Expenditures
Social Credit	Eric Frederick Duncan	3,506	39.72%	–	unknown
Liberal	Edward John (Jack) Luckhurst	1,071	12.13%		unknown
New Democratic	Stanley John Squire	4,249	48.14%		unknown
Total valid votes		8,826	100.00%		
Total rejected ballots		68			
Turnout		%			

28th British Columbia election, 1966
Party	Candidate	Votes	%	±	Expenditures
Social Credit	**Howard Richmond McDiarmid**	**6,039**	**55.55%**	–	unknown
Liberal	George McLean	511	4.70%		unknown
New Democratic	Stanley John Squire	4,321	39.75%		unknown
Total valid votes		10,871	100.00%		
Total rejected ballots		95			
Turnout		%			

29th British Columbia election, 1969
Party	Candidate	Votes	%	±	Expenditures
Social Credit	**Howard Richmond McDiarmid**	**7,209**	**47.08%**	–	unknown
Liberal	Eugene Edward Romaniuk	1,424	9.30%		unknown
New Democratic	Stanley John Squire	6,680	43.62%		unknown
Total valid votes		15,313	100.00%		
Total rejected ballots		131			
Turnout		%			

30th British Columbia election, 1972
Party	Candidate	Votes	%	±	Expenditures
Liberal	Wayne Albert Ramsey Cathers	2,272	12.92%		unknown
Social Credit	Thomas Johnstone	4,985	28.36%	–	unknown
New Democratic	**Robert Evans Skelly**	**9,439**	**53.69%**		unknown
Conservative	Edna Delthene Souther	883	5.02%		unknown
Total valid votes		17,579	100.00%		
Total rejected ballots		251			
Turnout		%			

31st British Columbia election, 1975
Party	Candidate	Votes	%	±	Expenditures
Social Credit	Charles Ormond Haggard	7,988	40.01%	–	unknown
Communist	Charles Ormond Haggard	84	0.42%		unknown
Liberal	Cecile Marie T. McKinnon	1,018	5.10%		unknown
Conservative	Allan Arthur Schroeder	1,278	6.40%		unknown
New Democratic	**Robert Evans Skelly**	**9,599**	**48.07%**		unknown
Total valid votes		19,967	100.00%		
Total rejected ballots		226			
Turnout		%			

32nd British Columbia election, 1979
Party	Candidate	Votes	%	±	Expenditures
New Democratic	**Robert Evans Skelly**	**7,935**	**57.63%**		unknown
Communist	Gary William Swann	97	0.71%		unknown
Social Credit	Joseph Van Bergen	5,736	41.66%	–	unknown
Total valid votes		13,768	100.00%		
Total rejected ballots		201			
Turnout		%			

33rd British Columbia election, 1983
Party	Candidate	Votes	%	±	Expenditures
Social Credit	Alice Chiko	5,496	37.34%	–	unknown
Western Canada Concept	Michael Thomas Gaughan	291	1.98%		unknown
Liberal	Susan Patricia Hutchinson	183	1.24%		unknown
New Democratic	**Robert Evans Skelly**	**8,656**	**58.81%**		unknown
Communist	Gary William Swann	92	0.63%		unknown
Total valid votes		14,718	100.00%		
Total rejected ballots		244			
Turnout		%			

1986 British Columbia general election
Party	Candidate	Votes	%
Green	Ronald Daniel Craigie Aspinall	87	0.56%
Liberal	William F. Mosdell	377	2.43%
New Democratic	**Robert Evans Skelly**	**8,597**	**55.29%**
Social Credit	Gillian Trumper	6,487	41.72%
Total valid votes		15,548	100.00%
Total rejected ballots		304	

British Columbia provincial by-election, November 19, 1988
Party	Candidate	Votes	%	±%
New Democratic	Gerard A. Janssen	6,401	57.47	+2.18
Social Credit	George S. Dryden	3,096	27.80	−13.92
Liberal	Shirley M. Bonfield	1,640	14.73	+12.3
Total valid votes/expense limit		11,137	100.0	–
Total rejected ballots		136	0.38	
Turnout		11,273		
New Democratic **hold**		Swing		+8.05
By-election due to the Resignation of Robert Skelly to run for the Canadian House of Commons.
Source(s) "November 19, 1988 By-election" (PDF). Legislative Assembly of British Columbia. November 19, 1988.

1991 British Columbia general election
Party	Candidate	Votes	%	±%
New Democratic	Gerard A. Janssen	7,136	53.39	-4.08
Social Credit	Gillian Trumper	3,665	27.43	-0.37
Liberal	Peter J. Tanner	2,358	17.64	+2.91
Western Canada Concept	Alan W. Banford	206	1.54	–
Total valid votes		13,365	100.00	
Total rejected ballots		372	0.27	
Turnout		13,737		
New Democratic **hold**		Swing		-2.23

1996 British Columbia general election
Party	Candidate	Votes	%	±%
New Democratic	Gerard A. Janssen	7,398	52.01	-1.38
Liberal	Gillian Trumper	5,099	35.85	+18.21
Reform	V. Hansen	823	5.79	–
Progressive Democrat	Ingrid Helen Rebar	578	4.06	–
Green	Andre Sperling	195	1.37	–
Co-operative Commonwealth	Karl Angus	72	0.51	–
Natural Law	Kathleen Lapreyrouse	58	0.41	–
Total valid votes		14,223	100.00	
Total rejected ballots		86	0.98	
Turnout		14,309		
New Democratic **hold**		Swing		+9.80

The riding was redistributed after the 1996 election. The main successor riding is Alberni-Qualicum.

== Sources ==
Elections BC historical returns

Legislative Assembly of British Columbia
Preceded by Vancouver City	Constituency represented by the Premier of British Columbia; 1916–1918	Succeeded by Dewdney
