= Charles William Morrow =

Canadian politician

Member of the Legislative Assembly of British Columbia
- In office 1945–1952
- Preceded by: Kenneth C. MacDonald
- Succeeded by: Lorne Shantz
- Constituency: North Okanagan

Personal details
- Born: July 24, 1897 Prescott, Ontario
- Died: March 16, 1980 (aged 82) Vernon, British Columbia
- Party: Liberal
- Occupation: lawyer

Charles William Morrow (July 24, 1897 – March 16, 1980) was a lawyer, judge and political figure in British Columbia. He represented North Okanagan in the Legislative Assembly of British Columbia from 1945 to 1952 as a Liberal.

He was born in Prescott, Ontario and was educated in British Columbia. Morrow was called to the British Columbia bar in 1920 and practised in Vernon, serving as city solicitor for 25 years. Morrow was a member of the Dominion Council for the Boy Scouts of Canada. During World War I, he served in the infantry and the Royal Air Force. During World War II, Morrow commanded the Pacific Coast Rangers in the North Okanagan region. In the provincial assembly, he was a member of the Liberal-Conservative coalition, serving as deputy speaker and government whip. Morrow was defeated when he ran for reelection in 1952. He was named a British Columbia county court judge in 1956, moving to Prince George in Cariboo County. In 1965, he was transferred to Yale County. Morrow served on several Royal Commissions for the provincial government. He retired from the bench in 1972. In 1977, he was given the Freedom of the City for Vernon. He died in 1980.
