= Columbia (electoral district) =

Defunct provincial electoral district in British Columbia, Canada

British Columbia electoral district

Defunct provincial electoral district
- Legislature: Legislative Assembly of British Columbia
- First contested: 1903
- Last contested: 1963

Columbia was a provincial electoral district in the Canadian province of British Columbia. It made its first appearance on the hustings in the election of 1903. It lasted until the 1928 election, when it was merged into Columbia-Revelstoke for the 1933 election. Following the election the new Pattullo government moved to re-establish Columbia as a separate riding, and former MLA Thomas King was elected by acclamation in a 1934 by-election.

In 1966 the riding was renamed Columbia River. This riding was later merged with the Revelstoke riding to become Columbia River-Revelstoke, the current riding for the western part of the area. The eastern part of the riding is now part of East Kootenay.

== Electoral history ==
Note: Winners of each election are in bold.

10th British Columbia election, 1903
Party	Candidate	Votes	%	±	Expenditures
**Liberal**	**Wilmer Cleveland Wells**	**Accl.**	-.-%		unknown
Total valid votes		n/a	-.-%		
Total rejected ballots					
Turnout		%			

11th British Columbia election, 1907
Party	Candidate	Votes	%	±	Expenditures
Conservative	**Henry George Parson**	**254**	**56.57%**		unknown
Liberal	Wilmer Cleveland Wells	195	43.43%	–	unknown
Total valid votes		449	100.00%		
Total rejected ballots					
Turnout		%			

12th British Columbia election, 1909
Party	Candidate	Votes	%	±	Expenditures
Liberal	John Andrew Buckham	245	48.32%	–	unknown
Conservative	**Henry George Parson**	**262**	**51.68%**		unknown
Total valid votes		507	100.00%		
Total rejected ballots					
Turnout		%			

13th British Columbia election, 1912
Party	Candidate	Votes	%	±	Expenditures
Independent Conservative	**Harold Ernest Forster^{1}**	**282**	**51.74%**		
Conservative	George Henry Parson	263	48.26%		
Total valid votes		545	100.00%		
^{1} When he failed to obtain the official nomination, Forster ran as an Independent Conservative but in full support of the McBride government.

14th British Columbia election, 1916
Party	Candidate	Votes	%	±	Expenditures
**Liberal**	**John Andrew Buckham**	**541**	**66.63%**		unknown
Conservative	James Norman Taylor	271	33.37%		unknown
Total valid votes		812	100.00%		
Total rejected ballots					
Turnout		%			

15th British Columbia election, 1920
Party	Candidate	Votes	%	±	Expenditures
**Liberal**	**John Andrew Buckham**	**584**	**60.58%**		unknown
Conservative	Henry George Parson	380	39.42%		unknown
Total valid votes		964	100.00%		
Total rejected ballots					
Turnout		%			

16th British Columbia election, 1924
Party	Candidate	Votes	%	±	Expenditures
**Liberal**	**John Andrew Buckham**	**644**	**56.84%**		unknown
Conservative	Arthur Murray Chisholm	294	25.95%		unknown
Provincial	James Stewart Johnston	195	17.21%	–	unknown
Total valid votes		1,133	100.00%		
Total rejected ballots					
Turnout		%			

17th British Columbia election, 1928
Party	Candidate	Votes	%	±	Expenditures
**Liberal**	**John Andrew Buckham**	**659**	**50.23%**		unknown
Independent	Gladys Elspeth Cross	26	1.98%		unknown
Conservative	Earle Jennings Scovil	627	47.79%		unknown
Total valid votes		1,312	100.00%		
Total rejected ballots		23			
Turnout		%			

After the 1928 election, there was a redistribution. The Columbia riding was merged with the Revelstoke riding into Columbia-Revelstoke, which first appeared only in the 1933 general election. The riding name "Columbia" was re-established in 1934, with Thomas King becoming its MLA by acclamation.

19th British Columbia election, 1937
Party	Candidate	Votes	%	±	Expenditures
Conservative	Leonard G. Gaddes	371	22.99%		unknown
**Liberal**	**Thomas King**	**921**	**57.06%**		unknown
Co-operative Commonwealth Fed.	William Henry Tallis	322	19.95%		unknown
Total valid votes		1,614	100.00%		
Total rejected ballots		39			
Turnout		%			

20th British Columbia election, 1941
Party	Candidate	Votes	%	±	Expenditures
Conservative	Leonard G. Gaddes	384	25.28%		unknown
**Liberal**	**Thomas King**	**648**	**42.66%**		unknown
Co-operative Commonwealth Fed.	James Herbert Mathews	487	32.06%		unknown
Total valid votes		1,519	100.00%		
Total rejected ballots		9			
Turnout		%			

20th British Columbia election, 1945
Party	Candidate	Votes	%	±	Expenditures
Co-operative Commonwealth Fed.	Thomas James Alton	588	46.70%		unknown
Coalition	**Thomas King**	**671**	**53.30%**	–	unknown
Total valid votes		1,259	100.00%		
Total rejected ballots		24			
Turnout		%			

21st British Columbia election, 1949
Party	Candidate	Votes	%	±	Expenditures
Co-operative Commonwealth Fed.	Thomas James Alton	581	31.09%		unknown
Coalition	**Thomas King**	**1,288**	**68.91%**	–	unknown
Total valid votes		1,869	100.00%		
Total rejected ballots		24			
Turnout		%			

22nd British Columbia election, 1952 ^{2}
Party	Candidate	Votes 1st count	%	Votes final count	%	±%	
Liberal	Vaughn Stanley Kimpton	649	29.30%	860	42.28%		unknown
Co-operative Commonwealth Fed.	Chris Madson	365	16.48%				unknown
B.C. Social Credit League	**Richard Orr Newton**	841	37.97%	1,174	57.72%		unknown
Progressive Conservative	Edward Jefferson Zinkan	360	16.25%				unknown
Total valid votes		2,215	100.00%	2,034			
Total rejected ballots		101					
Turnout		%					
^{2} Preferential ballot. First and final counts of three only shown.

British Columbia provincial by-election, November 24, 1952 Resignation of Richard Orr Newton
Party	Candidate	Votes	%
Social Credit	Robert William Bonner	1,146	57.56
Liberal	George Keenleyside	455	22.85
Co-operative Commonwealth	Chris Madson	390	19.59
Total valid votes		1,991	
Total rejected ballots		63	
Source: Elections BC

23rd British Columbia election, 1953 ^{3}
Party	Candidate	Votes 1st count	%	Votes final count	%	±%	
Co-operative Commonwealth Fed.	Eileen Catherine Madson	481	22.26%				unknown
**Liberal**	Henry Headley Moore	676	31.28%	787	43.12%		unknown
B.C. Social Credit League	**Richard Orr Newton**	924	42.76%	1,038	56.88%		unknown
Progressive Conservative	Edward Jefferson Zinkan	80	3.70%	-	-.- %		unknown
Total valid votes		2,161	100.00%	1,825			
Total rejected ballots		105					
Turnout		%					
^{3} Preferential ballot. First and final counts of three only shown.

24th British Columbia election, 1956
Party	Candidate	Votes	%	±	Expenditures
Co-operative Commonwealth Fed.	Chris Madson	248	12.56%		unknown
Social Credit	**Richard Orr Newton**	**1,074**	**54.41%**	–	unknown
Liberal	Samuel Forrest Thompson	652	33.03%	–	unknown
Total valid votes		1,974	100.00%		
Total rejected ballots		20			
Turnout		%			

25th British Columbia election, 1960
Party	Candidate	Votes	%	±	Expenditures
Liberal	Herbert Alexander Blakley	593	22.52%	–	unknown
Co-operative Commonwealth Fed.	Robert Beverly Harris	775	29.43%		unknown
Social Credit	**Richard Orr Newton**	**1,115**	**42.35%**	–	unknown
Progressive Conservative	Gordon Truls Rad	150	5.70%		unknown
Total valid votes		2,633	100.00%		
Total rejected ballots		88			
Turnout		%			

British Columbia provincial by-election, July 15, 1963
Party	Candidate	Votes	%
Social Credit	Frank Greenwood	1,122	36.68
Progressive Conservative	Alvin Walter John Trott	685	22.39
Liberal	Robert Keenleyside	643	21.02
NDP-CCF	Robert Beverly Harris	609	19.91
Total valid votes		3,059	
Total rejected ballots		13	
Called upon the death of R. O. Newton on 14 February 1963.
Source: http://www.elections.bc.ca/docs/rpt/1871-1986_ElectoralHistoryofBC.pdf

26th British Columbia election, 1963
Party	Candidate	Votes	%	±	Expenditures
Social Credit	**James Roland Chabot**	**1,305**	**40.08%**	–	unknown
New Democratic	Robert Beverly Harris	467	14.34%		unknown
Liberal	Robert Keenleyside	392	12.04%	–	unknown
Progressive Conservative	Alvin Walter Jo	1,092	33.54%		unknown
Total valid votes		3,256	100.00%		
Total rejected ballots		41			
Turnout		%			

The riding was redistributed after the 1963 election. In 1966, it was succeeded by the Columbia River riding.

== See also ==
- List of British Columbia provincial electoral districts
- Canadian provincial electoral districts
