= Wells Gray =

Canadian politician

Arthur "Wells" Gray

Minister of Lands of British Columbia
- In office November 15, 1933 – May 7, 1944
- Premier: Duff Pattullo (1933–1941); John Hart (1941–1944)
- Succeeded by: John Hart

Minister of Municipal Affairs of British Columbia
- In office March 31, 1934 – May 7, 1944
- Premier: Duff Pattullo (1933–1941); John Hart (1941–1944)
- Succeeded by: Herbert Anscomb

Member of the British Columbia Legislative Assembly for New Westminster
- In office August 25, 1927 – May 7, 1944
- Preceded by: Edwin James Rothwell
- Succeeded by: Boss Johnson

23rd Mayor of New Westminster
- In office 1927–1933
- Preceded by: T.S. Annandale
- Succeeded by: Frederick Hume
- In office 1913–1919
- Preceded by: John A. Lee
- Succeeded by: J. J. Johnston

Personal details
- Born: 1876 New Westminster, British Columbia
- Died: May 7, 1944 (aged 67–68) Victoria, British Columbia

Arthur Wellesley Gray (1876 – 7 May 1944) was a British Columbia cabinet minister and mayor. He is particularly noted for his work creating some of British Columbia's early provincial parks and Wells Gray Provincial Park is named for him. His colleagues usually called him by his nickname, "Wells".

== Early life ==
Gray was born in New Westminster, British Columbia, in 1876. As a youth, he achieved distinction in lacrosse and was a member of the New Westminster Salmonbellies Club which won the world lacrosse championship in 1900.

== Career ==
At age 30, Gray was elected alderman of New Westminster and at age 36 he became mayor, a post he held from 1913 to 1919 and again from 1927 to 1930. In 1927, he was also elected to the British Columbia Legislature in Victoria and was re-elected at the next four provincial elections with significant majorities. In 1933, Premier Duff Pattullo appointed Gray Minister of Lands and in 1934, he was given the additional duties of Minister of Municipal Affairs. Between November 18, 1941 and December 9, 1941, he also served as Provincial Secretary.

In 1938, with the assistance of British Columbia's Chief Forester, Ernest Callaway Manning, (Note: Not to be confused with Ernest Charles Manning, who was Premier of Alberta from 1943 to 1968.) Gray began to enact legislation creating provincial parks. Tweedsmuir Park was first, located in the Coast Mountains, and it is still the province's largest park. Later that year, Hamber Park in the Rocky Mountains was set aside. In 1939, a large park was proposed for the drainage basin of the Clearwater River and, when the Order in Council to establish it was passed, the park was named Wells Gray Provincial Park in his honour. The next park was being planned for the Cascade Range of southern British Columbia and was dedicated as E.C. Manning Provincial Park, after Manning was killed in a plane crash in 1941. Tourists and hikers of the 21st century owe much to the vision of Gray and Manning.

Gray took a tour of the British Columbia interior region during the summer of 1940 and spent four days in Wells Gray Park. He rode the train to Clearwater, then was driven to the end of the road at the park boundary where he stayed at the Helset Ranch. He travelled by horse to see Helmcken Falls, camped at The Horseshoe on the Clearwater River for two nights, then boated along Mahood Lake to stay at Mahood Lake Lodge overnight.

Chess Lyons was appointed by Gray in 1940 to conduct the first survey of Wells Gray Park. He wrote in his report in 1941, “Named after the Honourable A. Wells Gray, it perpetuates the name of an athlete, conservationist, outstanding citizen and statesman. Always a staunch supporter of sportsmen, realizing the value of outdoor activities for British Columbia’s own populace and envisioning the value to the Province of setting aside outstanding features as tourist attractions, the Honourable A. Wells Gray in his administration has correlated the multiple use of our forested lands, lakes, streams and scenic resources.”

== Death and legacy ==
Gray died suddenly in Victoria from a heart ailment on May 7, 1944. Royal Maitland, a fellow cabinet minister, commented, "No man ever had a greater interest in his own town than he had in New Westminster and everywhere you look in the Royal City you see a monument to something he has accomplished there. A quiet lovable man, he will be greatly missed by the thousands who knew him."
