= North Okanagan =

Defunct provincial electoral district in British Columbia, Canada

North Okanagan was the name of a provincial electoral district in British Columbia, Canada, beginning with the election of 1916. Following the 1975 election boundary revisions accompanied the riding's renaming to Okanagan North. The riding was originally part of the Yale riding until 1890, and when first that riding was broken up the Okanagan was in Yale-East (1894–1900), and then in Okanagan (1903–1912). Both North Okanagan and South Okanagan were created in advance of the 1916 election.

== Notable MLAs ==
- Price Ellison
- Kenneth Cattanach MacDonald, 1916–1928, 1933–1945 (d. in office), Liberal
- Lorne Shantz — Social Credit
- Patricia Jordan

== Election results ==
Note: Winners of each election are in bold.

14th British Columbia election, 1916
Party	Candidate	Votes	%	±	Expenditures
Conservative	Price Ellison	948	42.92%		unknown
**Liberal**	**Kenneth Cattanach MacDonald**	**1,261**	**57.08%**		unknown
Total valid votes		2,209	100.00%		
Total rejected ballots					
Turnout		%			

1920 British Columbia general election
Party	Candidate	Votes	%
Liberal	Kenneth Cattanach MacDonald	2,037	53.51
United Farmers	William Frederick Laidman	1,770	46.49
Total valid votes		3,807	100.00

16th British Columbia election, 1924
Party	Candidate	Votes	%	±	Expenditures
Provincial	Richard John Coltart	1,070	26.08%		
Independent Conservative	Price Ellison	764	18.62%		
Conservative	Arthur Thomas Howe	907	22.11%		
**Liberal**	**Kenneth Cattanach MacDonald**	**1,362**	**33.20%**		
Total valid votes		4,103	100.00%		

1928 British Columbia general election
Party	Candidate	Votes	%
Independent Farmer	Arthur Thomas Howe	128	2.93%
Conservative	**William Farris Kennedy**	2,361	54.03%
Liberal	Peter Douglas Van Kleeck	1,881	43.04%
Total valid votes		4,370	100.00%
Total rejected ballots		57	

18th British Columbia election, 1933
Party	Candidate	Votes	%	±	Expenditures
Co-operative Commonwealth Fed.	Stephen Freeman	868	17.95%		unknown
Non-Partisan Independent Group	Matthew Hassen	1,646	34.04%	–	unknown
**Liberal**	**Kenneth Cattanach MacDonald**	**2,322**	**48.01%**		unknown
Total valid votes		4,836	100.00%		
Total rejected ballots		46			
Turnout		%			

19th British Columbia election, 1937
Party	Candidate	Votes	%	±	Expenditures
Co-operative Commonwealth Fed.	Stephen Freeman	700	13.70%		unknown
Conservative	Gordon Lindsay	1,719	33.65%		unknown
**Liberal**	**Kenneth Cattanach MacDonald**	**2,689**	**52.64%**		unknown
Total valid votes		5,108	100.00%		
Total rejected ballots		81			
Turnout		%			

20th British Columbia election, 1941
Party	Candidate	Votes	%	±	Expenditures
Co-operative Commonwealth Fed.	Gordon Daniel Herbert	1,071	18.16%		unknown
Conservative	Lindsay Gordon	2,320	39.33%		unknown
**Liberal**	**Kenneth Cattanach MacDonald**	**2,508**	**42.52%**		unknown
Total valid votes		5,899	100.00%		
Total rejected ballots		79			
Turnout		%			

21st British Columbia election, 1945
Party	Candidate	Votes	%	±	Expenditures
Coalition	**Kenneth Cattanach MacDonald** ^{7}	**2,990**	**59.78%**	–	unknown
Social Credit Alliance	Oswald Scheir	430	8.60%		unknown
Co-operative Commonwealth Fed.	Leonard Warner Wood	1,582	31.63%		unknown
Total valid votes		5,002	100.00%		
Total rejected ballots		102			
Turnout		%			
^{7} Died after the election and before the opening of the new legislature.

22nd British Columbia election, 1949
Party	Candidate	Votes	%	±	Expenditures
Co-operative Commonwealth Fed.	William Alfred Monk	2,657	32.61%		unknown
Coalition	**Charles William Morrow**	**4,966**	**60.95%**	–	unknown
Social Credit	Lorne Shantz	525	6.44%		unknown
Total valid votes		8,148	100.00%		
Total rejected ballots		190			
Turnout		%			

23rd British Columbia election, 1952^{8}
Party	Candidate	Votes 1st count	%	Votes final count	%	±%	
Progressive Conservative	David Fremont Buell Kinloch	1,240	13.08%	-	-.- %		unknown
Co-operative Commonwealth Fed.	William Alfred Monk	1,786	18.85%	-	-.- %		unknown
Liberal	Charles William Morrow	2,104	22.20%	3,063	35.99%		unknown
Social Credit League	**Lorne Shantz**	**4,347**	**45.87%**	**5,447**	**64.01%**		
Total valid votes		9,477	100.00%	8,510	%		
Total rejected ballots		392					
Turnout		%					
^{8} Preferential ballot; final count is between top two candidates from first count; first and final of three (3) counts shown only.

24th British Columbia election, 1953 ^{9}
Party	Candidate	Votes 1st count	%	Votes final count	%	±%	
Progressive Conservative	Neville Ross Patrick Duke	700	7.77%	-	-.- %		unknown
Co-operative Commonwealth Fed.	Bruce Edward Emerson	1,749	19.42%	1,868	21.10%		unknown
Labor-Progressive	Nicholas (Nick) Klim	90	1.00%	-	-.-%		
Social Credit	**Lorne Shantz**	**4,398**	**48.82%**	**4,578**	**51.71%**		
Liberal	Franklyn Valair	2,071	22.99%	2,407	27.19%		unknown
Total valid votes		9,008	100.00%	8,853	%		
Total rejected ballots		477					
Total Registered Voters							
Turnout		%					
^{9} Preferential ballot; final count is between top two candidates from first count; intermediary counts (of 3) not shown.

25th British Columbia election, 1956
Party	Candidate	Votes	%	±	Expenditures
Liberal	John A. Davis	2,272	27.14%		unknown
Labor-Progressive	Nicholas (Nick) Klim	88	1.05%		unknown
Co-operative Commonwealth Fed.	William Alfred Monk	1,429	17.07%		unknown
Social Credit	**Lorne Shantz**	**4,583**	**54.74%**	–	unknown
Total valid votes		8,372	100.00%		
Total rejected ballots		184			
Turnout		%			

26th British Columbia election, 1960
Party	Candidate	Votes	%	±	Expenditures
Liberal	John A. Davis	1,817	17.16%		unknown
Labor-Progressive	Nicholas (Nick) Klim	91	0.86%		unknown
Progressive Conservative	John M. Kosty	1,098	10.37%		unknown
Co-operative Commonwealth Fed.	Isabella Pothecary ^{10}	3,028	28.60%		unknown
Social Credit	**Lorne Shantz**	**4,553**	**43.01%**	–	unknown
Total valid votes		10,587	100.00%		
Total rejected ballots		118			
Turnout		%			
^{10} In 1963 Statement of Votes listed as Isobel.

27th British Columbia election, 1963
Party	Candidate	Votes	%	±	Expenditures
Liberal	Frank F. Becker	2,076	20.75%		unknown
Progressive Conservative	Harry W. Byatt	1,765	17.64%		unknown
Social Credit	**George William McLeod**	**4,157**	**41.55%**	–	unknown
New Democratic	Isobel Pothecary	2,008	20.07%		unknown
Total valid votes		10,006	100.00%		
Total rejected ballots		69			
Turnout		%			

28th British Columbia election, 1966
Party	Candidate	Votes	%	±	Expenditures
Liberal	Frank F. Becker	2,408	30.46%		unknown
Social Credit	**Patricia Jordan**	**3,841**	**48.59%**	–	unknown
New Democratic	James McAnulty	1,535	19.42%		unknown
Independent	Ellwood Charles Rice	121	19.42%		unknown
Total valid votes		7,905	100.00%		
Total rejected ballots		63			
Turnout		%			

29th British Columbia election, 1969
Party	Candidate	Votes	%	±	Expenditures
Social Credit	**Patricia Jordan**	**6,610**	**60.01%**	–	unknown
Liberal	Robert Richard Neil	2,127	19.31%		unknown
New Democratic	Colleen Wilhelmina Pringle	2,278	20.68%		unknown
Total valid votes		11,015	100.00%		
Total rejected ballots		103			
Turnout		%			

30th British Columbia election, 1972
Party	Candidate	Votes	%	±	Expenditures
Liberal	Kenneth Leyden Christensen	2,960	20.81%		unknown
Social Credit	**Patricia Jordan**	**5,323**	**37.43%**	–	unknown
Progressive Conservative	Brian George Usher	2,080	14.63%		unknown
New Democratic	Jerry Winters	3,859	27.13%		unknown
Total valid votes		14,222	100.00%		
Total rejected ballots		118			
Turnout		%			

31st British Columbia election, 1975
Party	Candidate	Votes	%	±	Expenditures
Liberal	Daniel Gaetano DeGirolamo	2,305	12.32%		unknown
New Democratic	James Arthur Foord	6,510	34.78%		unknown
Social Credit	**Patricia Jordan**	**9,900**	**52.90%**	–	unknown
Total valid votes		18,715	100.00%		
Total rejected ballots		165			
Turnout		%			

Redistribution of the riding following the 1975 election saw adjustments of its boundaries and a new name, Okanagan North.

== See also ==
- List of British Columbia provincial electoral districts
- Canadian provincial electoral districts
