= K. C. MacDonald =

Canadian politician

MLA for North Okanagan
- In office 1916–1924
- Preceded by: Price Ellison
- Succeeded by: Arthur Cochrane
- In office 1933–1945
- Preceded by: George Heggie
- Succeeded by: Charles William Morrow

Personal details
- Born: Kenneth Cattanach MacDonald; July 11, 1872 Mattawa, Ontario
- Died: November 19, 1945 (aged 73) Victoria, British Columbia
- Party: British Columbia Liberal Party
- Occupation: dentist

Kenneth Cattanach MacDonald (July 11, 1872 – November 19, 1945) was a Canadian politician. After unsuccessfully running in the 1907 provincial election, he served in the Legislative Assembly of British Columbia from 1916 to 1924 and from 1933 to his death in 1945, as a Liberal member for the constituency of North Okanagan. He was known by his initials, "K. C." He served as the Provincial Secretary for British Columbia from September 6, 1924 until October 6, 1924.

When the Liberals returned to government in the 1933 provincial election, MacDonald was appointed Minister of Agriculture in the Pattullo ministry. Following the 1941 provincial election, in which the Liberals lost their majority, MacDonald advocated the formation of a coalition government. When Pattullo refused to consider one and instead moved forward with a minority government, he resigned from cabinet in protest on November 20 — the fifth cabinet member to do so. After Pattullo was replaced as premier by John Hart, who promptly formed a coalition, MacDonald was re-appointed Minister of Agriculture in the Hart ministry.

MacDonald died on November 19, 1945.
