= Norman William Whittaker =

Canadian politician and judge (1893–1983)

Speaker of the Legislative Assembly of British Columbia
- In office October 26, 1937 – September 1947
- Preceded by: Henry George Thomas Perry
- Succeeded by: Robert Henry Carson

Attorney General of British Columbia
- In office November 14, 1941 – November 19, 1941
- Premier: Duff Pattullo
- Preceded by: Gordon Sylvester Wismer
- Succeeded by: Duff Pattullo

Member of the Legislative Assembly of British Columbia for Saanich
- In office November 2, 1933 – September 13, 1947
- Preceded by: Simon Fraser Tolmie
- Succeeded by: Arthur J. R. Ash

Personal details
- Born: November 18, 1893 Kamloops, British Columbia, Canada
- Died: June 12, 1985 (aged 91) Ottawa, Ontario, Canada
- Party: British Columbia Liberal Party
- Spouse: Gwendolyn C A Gillis
- Occupation: lawyer, judge

Norman William Whittaker (November 18, 1893 – June 12, 1985) was a lawyer, judge and political figure in British Columbia. After being an unsuccessful candidate in the 1928 provincial election, he represented Saanich in the Legislative Assembly of British Columbia from 1933 to 1947 as a Liberal member.

He was born in Kamloops in 1893 and was educated in Victoria. Whittaker studied law, articled in Victoria and set up practice there. In 1929, he married Gwendolyn C A Gillis. He was speaker of the assembly from 1937 to 1947. Whittaker also served briefly as Attorney General in 1941; he resigned his cabinet post to lobby for a Liberal-Conservative coalition government. In 1947, Whittaker resigned his seat in the legislature after being named to the BC Supreme Court. He was named to the Court of Appeal in 1963. Whittaker retired the following year due to problems with his wife's health. He died in Ottawa at the age of 91 on June 12, 1985.
