= James Mowat =

Canadian politician

MLA for Alberni
- In office 1941–1952

Personal details
- Born: October 6, 1889 Orkney Islands, Scotland, United Kingdom
- Died: October 26, 1962 (aged 73) Port Alberni, British Columbia, Canada
- Party: British Columbia Liberal Party

James Mowat (October 6, 1889 – October 26, 1962) was a Scottish-born merchant and political figure in British Columbia. He represented Alberni in the Legislative Assembly of British Columbia from 1941 to 1952 as a Liberal member of the coalition government. In the 1949 election we has elected as an independent because he lost the nomination for the party in his riding.

He was born on the Island of Hoy at Garson (Farm) Orkney Islands, the son of Thomas Robertson Mowat and Jean McKid Sutherland, and was educated there. Mowat came to Canada in 1910. In 1918, he married Isabella Margaret Davidson. Mowat served during World War I. Mowat was defeated when he ran for reelection in 1952 as a Liberal. A brain haemorrhage caused his death in 1962.
