= Royal Maitland =

Canadian politician (1889–1946)

The Honourable Royal Maitland KC
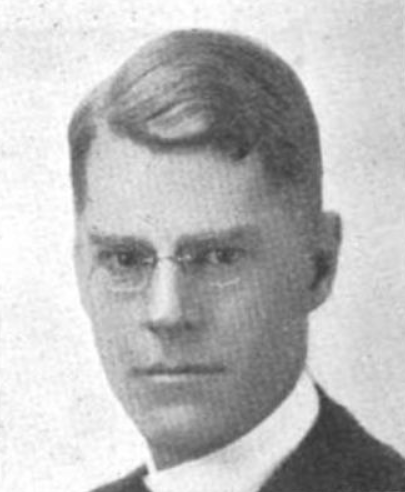

Attorney General of British Columbia
- In office December 10, 1941 – March 28, 1946
- Preceded by: Duff Pattullo
- Succeeded by: Gordon Sylvester Wismer

Member of the Legislative Assembly of British Columbia for Vancouver City
- In office 1928–1933

Member of the Legislative Assembly of British Columbia for Vancouver-Point Grey
- In office 1937–1946

15th President of the Canadian Bar Association
- In office 1943–1944
- Preceded by: Gordon Harold Aikins
- Succeeded by: François-Philippe Brais

Personal details
- Born: Royal Lethington Maitland; January 9, 1889 Ingersoll, Ontario, Canada
- Died: March 28, 1946 (aged 57) Vancouver, British Columbia, Canada
- Party: British Columbia Conservative Party
- Profession: Lawyer

Royal Lethington "Pat" Maitland KC (January 9, 1889 – March 28, 1946) was a Canadian lawyer and politician. He served as Attorney General of British Columbia in the Hart ministry. He also served as national president of the Canadian Bar Association.

== Legal career ==
Maitland was a prominent criminal lawyer and law professor, and was active in the Canadian Bar Association. He spent part of his career (1915 to 1919) as a city prosecutor in Vancouver. He served as President of the Association from 1943 to 1944, while he was Attorney General.

== Political career ==
After being an unsuccessful candidate in the 1924 provincial election, Maitland was first elected to the British Columbia Legislature as the Conservative MLA for Vancouver City in the 1928 general election. Between 1928 and 1933, he served in the cabinet as Minister without Portfolio. By the time of the 1933 provincial election, the Conservative government of Premier Simon Fraser Tolmie had collapsed into rival factions. Maitland did not stand for re-election.

Maitland returned to office in the 1937 general election from the riding of Vancouver-Point Grey. The next year, upon the death of Frank Porter Patterson, the leader of the Conservative Party, Maitland became party leader and Leader of the Opposition. His challenge was to rebuild the moribund British Columbia Conservative Party, which had split into two and collapsed in 1933 under Tolmie's leadership.

In the 1941 provincial election, Maitland led the Conservatives to a strong finish with 30.91 per cent of the vote and 12 seats, though with the CCF doubling its seats the party was consigned to third place. The Liberal government of Thomas Dufferin Pattullo was reduced to a minority government and though it won the greatest number of seats actually received fewer votes than the CCF. The Liberal Party pressured Pattullo to form a coalition government with the Conservatives in order to forestall the government's collapse and a possible CCF victory.

Pattullo refused and was replaced as Liberal leader and Premier by John Hart who was willing to form a coalition. Maitland's Conservatives joined the government, obtaining three seats in Cabinet to the Liberals' five. Maitland became Attorney General in the Hart ministry.

Four years later, in the 1945 provincial election, Maitland's Conservatives contested the election jointly with the Liberals and were re-elected.

== Death ==
Maitland died from influenza at Vancouver General Hospital on March 28, 1946, the year after his successful participation in the 1945 general election.
