= Herbert Anscomb =

Canadian politician (1892–1972)

Leader of the Opposition of British Columbia
- In office January 19, 1952 – June 12, 1952

Leader of the Progressive Conservative Party of British Columbia
- In office April 1946 – November 1952
- Preceded by: Royal Maitland
- Succeeded by: Deane Finlayson

Member of the Legislative Assembly of British Columbia for Oak Bay
- In office October 21, 1941 – June 12, 1952
- Preceded by: riding established
- Succeeded by: Philip Archibald Gibbs

Member of the Legislative Assembly of British Columbia for Victoria City
- In office November 2, 1933 – October 21, 1941

Herbert Bertie Anscomb (February 23, 1892 – November 12, 1972) was a Canadian politician in the province of British Columbia. He was leader of the Conservative Party of British Columbia from 1946 to 1952, and a cabinet minister in the Hart and Johnson ministries.

He was born in England and moved to Canada in 1911. He settled in Victoria, British Columbia where he found work as a bookkeeper for the Victoria Brewing Company eventually becoming manager of the company even though he was a tea-totaller.

In 1925 he was elected reeve of Oak Bay and in 1928 he became mayor of Victoria serving until 1931.

Anscomb entered provincial politics and was elected to the British Columbia Legislative Assembly in the 1933 provincial election as an Independent (the Conservatives had decided not to run in the election) and re-elected in 1937 as a Conservative. The Conservatives joined the ruling Liberals to form a coalition government led by John Hart following the 1941 provincial election. Following the death of Conservative leader Royal Lethington Maitland in 1946 Anscomb became Conservative leader as well as Finance Minister. A fiscal conservative, Anscomb introduced British Columbia's provincial sales tax at a rate of 3% in 1948. When Hart retired in 1947 the Conservatives wanted Anscomb to succeed him as Premier of British Columbia but the Liberals had more seats in the legislature and insisted that the Premier should remain a Liberal resulting in the appointment of Byron Johnson as premier. The conflict strained relations between Johnson and Anscomb and their parties in the subsequent coalition. The Conservatives were riven into three factions, one led by W.A.C. Bennett called for the Tories and Liberals to fuse into a single party, a second faction supported the status quo and a third wanted the Conservatives to leave the coalition. The Liberals, meanwhile, began to doubt the need to continue the coalition rather than govern on their own. The coalition was re-elected in the 1949 provincial election winning 39 seats against 7 for the Co-operative Commonwealth Federation opposition. Growing divisions within the Conservative Party resulted in Anscomb's leadership and the party's continuation in the coalition being unsuccessfully challenged at the 1950 party convention. W.A.C. Bennett, who was now in the anti-coalition faction, quit the party and crossed the floor to join and eventually led the British Columbia Social Credit Party.

In October 1951, the Liberal Party decided to dissolve the coalition and on January 18, 1952 Premier Johnson dismissed his Conservative ministers including Anscomb and continued as a minority government with Anscomb as Leader of the Opposition beginning in February 1952. The government soon collapsed and in the ensuing 1952 provincial election the Liberals were reduced to 6 seats, the Conservatives to 4 and Johnson and Anscomb both lost their seats while the Social Credit Party was able to form a government under Bennett that would rule the province for the next two decades.

Aside from serving as Minister of Finance between 1946 and 1952, Anscomb also served as Minister of Mines (1941 to 1942), Minister of Municipal Affairs (1944 to 1946), Minister of Public Works (1942 to 1946), Minister of Railways (1942 to 1946), and Minister of Trade and Industry (1941 to 1942).
