= Ernest Crawford Carson =

Canadian politician (1894–1952)

Ernest Crawford Carson (June 9, 1894 – October 21, 1952) was a rancher and political figure in British Columbia. He represented Lillooet in the Legislative Assembly of British Columbia from 1928 to 1933 as a Conservative and from 1941 to 1952 as a member of the Liberal-Conservative coalition government. He was reelected in 1952 as a Progressive Conservative.

He was born on the family ranch in the Cariboo country and was educated there and in Vancouver. After high school, Carson worked on a railway survey crew. He served overseas during World War I and on his return took over the operation of the family ranch. In 1921, Carson married Halcyon Emma Hills. He served as postmaster at Pavilion from 1936 to 1941. Carson was defeated in the 1920 provincial election and also when he ran for reelection in 1933 and 1937. He later served in the provincial cabinet as Minister of Mines (1942 to 1946), Minister of Trade and Industry (1942 to 1946), and as Minister of Public Works (1946 to 1952). In 1952, Carson died in office of a heart attack in Oak Bay at the age of 58.

His brother Robert also served in the assembly.
