= Robert Henry Carson =

Canadian politician (1885–1971)

Robert Henry Carson (November 7, 1885 – March 7, 1971) was a life insurance agent and political figure in British Columbia, Canada. He represented Kamloops in the Legislative Assembly of British Columbia from 1933 to 1949 as a Liberal then Liberal-Conservative Coalition member.

He was born on Pavilion Farm, a ranch in British Columbia, the son of Robert Carson and Eliza Jane Magee, and was educated in New Westminster. In 1912, Carson married Constance Hildred Robson. He ran unsuccessfully for a seat in the British Columbia assembly in 1928. Carson served as Deputy Speaker of the Legislative Assembly from 1937 to 1941 and from 1943 to 1944. He then served as Speaker of the Legislative Assembly of British Columbia from 1948 to 1949. He was president of the Richmond Point Grey Board of Trade.

Carson died in Kamloops at the age of 85 in 1971.

His brother Ernest Crawford also served in the provincial assembly.
