= Roderick Charles MacDonald =

Canadian politician

Member of the British Columbia Legislative Assembly for Dewdney
- In office 1941–1952
- Preceded by: Frank Porter Patterson
- Succeeded by: Lyle Wicks

Personal details
- Born: November 1885 North Uist, Scotland
- Died: September 18, 1978 (aged 92) New Westminster, British Columbia, Canada
- Party: British Columbia Conservative Party
- Occupation: Merchant

Roderick Charles MacDonald (November 1885 – September 18, 1978) was a Scottish-born merchant and political figure in British Columbia. After being an unsuccessful candidate in the Burnaby riding in the 1937 provincial election, he represented Dewdney in the Legislative Assembly of British Columbia from 1941 to 1952 as a Conservative.

He was born in North Uist in November 1885, the son of Malcolm MacDonald and Mary A. MacAulay, and was educated there. He came to Canada in 1907, settling in Coquitlam. In 1915, MacDonald married D. E. Wiltshire. He was a member of the Coquitlam council, also serving as reeve from 1924 to 1941 and as president of the Union of British Columbia Municipalities. Between April 1946 and January 1952, MacDonald served in the provincial cabinet as Minister of Mines and Minister of Municipal Affairs. He was defeated when he ran for reelection in 1952. MacDonald died on September 18, 1978, in New Westminster at the age of 92.

R. C. MacDonald Elementary School in Coquitlam was named in his honour.
