= Thomas King (Canadian politician) =

Canadian politician

Thomas King (September 5, 1879 – December 18, 1972) was a merchant, farmer and political figure in British Columbia. He represented Columbia in the Legislative Assembly of British Columbia from 1931 to 1933 and from 1934 to 1952 as a Liberal.

He was born in Angus, Ontario in 1879, the son of John Leary and Mary Scott, and was educated in Cookstown. In 1901, Leary married a Miss Woodley. He lived in Golden. He was first elected to the assembly in a 1931 by-election held following the death of John Andrew Buckham. From November 15, 1941 to December 9, 1941, he served as Minister of Public Works and Minister of Railways. Subsequently, from 1941 to 1952, King was part of a Liberal-Conservative coalition government. King died in Golden in 1972, aged 93.
