= Leslie Harvey Eyres =

Canadian politician (1892–1983)

Member of the Legislative Assembly of British Columbia for Chilliwack
- In office 1937 – 1952
- Preceded by: Edward Dodsley Barrow
- Succeeded by: William Kenneth Kiernan

Personal details
- Born: August 3, 1892 MacGregor, Manitoba, Canada
- Died: February 26, 1983 (aged 90) Victoria, British Columbia, Canada
- Party: Conservative
- Occupation: Tire merchant, politician

Leslie Harvey Eyres (August 3, 1892 – February 26, 1983) was a tire merchant and political figure in British Columbia. He represented Chilliwack in the Legislative Assembly of British Columbia from 1937 to 1952 as a Conservative.

He was born in MacGregor, Manitoba, the son of Charles Eyres and Emily Turner, and was educated in MacGregor and Brandon. In 1922, Eyres married Adelia Sanford. He served three years in the Royal Canadian Air Force. Eyres was an alderman for Chilliwack City Council for 13 years. He served as deputy speaker of the Legislature in 1946. He then served in the provincial cabinet as Minister of Railways (1946 to 1952), Minister of Trade and Industry (1946 to 1952), and Minister of Fisheries (1947 to 1952). Eyres was defeated when he ran for reelection to the provincial assembly in 1952. He died in Victoria at the age of 90.
