= Gordon Sylvester Wismer =

Canadian politician

Gordon Sylvester Wismer (March 23, 1888 – December 28, 1968) was a lawyer and political figure in British Columbia. He represented Vancouver Centre in the Legislative Assembly of British Columbia from 1933 to 1941 and from 1945 to 1952 as a Liberal.

He was born in Sutton, Ontario. Wismer served in the provincial cabinet as Attorney General from 1937 to 1941 and from 1946 to 1952 and as Minister of Labour from 1947 to 1949. Wismer was defeated when he ran for reelection in 1941. He was elected to the assembly in the 1945 and 1949 elections as a member of a Liberal-Conservative coalition. In the 1947 provincial Liberal leadership convention, Wismer lost to Byron "Boss" Johnson by 8 votes. While Wismer was Attorney General, in 1950, the British Columbia Provincial Police force was disbanded and the Royal Canadian Mounted Police took over policing in the province. He died in Victoria at the age of 80.
