= Edward Tourtellotte Kenney =

Canadian politician

Edward Tourtellotte Kenney (July 19, 1888 – September 18, 1974) was a merchant, real estate and insurance agent and political figure in British Columbia. He represented Skeena in the Legislative Assembly of British Columbia from 1933 to 1953 in the Legislative Assembly of British Columbia as a Liberal.

He was born in Clark's Harbour, Nova Scotia in 1888, the son of Daniel V. Kenney and Margaret C. Newell, and was educated in Yarmouth. In 1915, Kenney married Janet Leila Brooks. He operated a hardware store. Kenney was a stipendiary magistrate at Terrace from 1922 to 1933. Kenney served in the provincial cabinet as Minister of Lands (1944 to 1945), Minister of Lands and Forests (1945 to 1952) and Minister of Public Works (1952). From 1941 to 1952, he was a member of the Liberal-Conservative coalition in the provincial assembly. In 1958, he was an unsuccessful candidate for a seat in the Canadian House of Commons. He died on September 18, 1974.

The Kenney Dam on the Nechako River was named after him.
