= Frank Putnam (politician) =

Member of the Legislative Assembly of British Columbia
- In office 1933–1949
- Succeeded by: Walter Hendricks
- Constituency: Nelson-Creston

Personal details
- Born: August 23, 1881 Truro, Nova Scotia
- Died: October 10, 1959 (aged 78) Vancouver, British Columbia
- Party: Liberal (–1945); Coalition (1945–1949)
- Spouse: Julia Bronogeest

Frank Hedley Putnam (August 23, 1881 – October 10, 1959) was a Canadian politician. He served in the Legislative Assembly of British Columbia from 1933 to 1949 from the electoral district of Nelson-Creston, a member of the Coalition government, previously a member of the Liberal part from 1933 to 1941.
