= George Sharratt Pearson =

Canadian politician

George Sharratt Pearson (April 27, 1880 – August 24, 1966) was a Canadian politician in the province of British Columbia. He represented the ridings of Nanaimo from 1928 to 1933, Alberni-Nanaimo from 1933 to 1941 and Nanaimo and the Islands from 1941 to 1952 in the Legislative Assembly of British Columbia as a Liberal.

He was born in Bromley, Staffordshire in 1880, the son of Joseph Dudley Pearson and Emma Sharratt. Pearson came to Canada in 1889; he was educated in Nanaimo, British Columbia. In 1904, Pearson married Emmeline Pearce. He served in the provincial cabinet as Minister of Labour (1933 to 1941 and, after almost one month out of office, from 1941 to 1947), Minister of Mines (1933 to 1937), Minister of Railways (1937 to 1939), Provincial Secretary (1941 to 1950), and Minister of Health and Welfare (1946 to 1950). Pearson was president of the Nanaimo General Hospital. From 1941 to 1952, he was a member of a Liberal-Conservative coalition in the provincial assembly. Pearson died in Nanaimo at the age of 86 in 1966.

In 1942 Pearson was a powerful political leader who adamantly advocated for the entire Japanese population to be driven out of British Columbia, in spite of military, navy and RCMP assertion, that they posed no threat. According to Canadian lawyer Mark Sakamoto, “B.C.politicians took the floor. They were led by George Pearson, B.C.’s minister of labour. He was half mad with rage. His position was that the entire Japanese population could not be trusted and he sought a final solution for his province: drive them all out.”

George Pearson Centre of Vancouver Coastal Health, originally known as the Pearson Tuberculosis Hospital, was named in his honour. The Pearson Bridge and Pearson Park in Nanaimo and the retired BC ferry MV George S. Pearson were also named after Pearson.

On September 14, 2021, Vancouver Coastal Health Authority announced that they would be renaming the George Pearson Centre due to his history of lobbying against the rights and freedoms of Japanese Canadians in the 1940s. On Jan 21 2025, George Pearson Centre was officially renamed to Oak Care Centre.
