= 25th Parliament of British Columbia =

The 25th Legislative Assembly of British Columbia sat from 1957 to 1960. The members were elected in the British Columbia general election held in September 1956. The Social Credit Party led by W. A. C. Bennett formed the government. The Co-operative Commonwealth Federation (CCF) led by Robert Strachan formed the official opposition.

Thomas James Irwin served as speaker for the assembly until April 1957; he was elected to the Canadian House of Commons later that year. Lorne Shantz replaced Irwin as speaker in 1958.

== Members of the 25th Parliament ==
The following members were elected to the assembly in 1956:

Member	Electoral district	Party	First elected / previously elected	No.# of term(s)
Stanley John Squire	Alberni	CCF	1952	3rd term
William James Asselstine	Atlin	Social Credit	1933, (Note: First elected as a Liberal) 1956	4th term*
Gordon Dowding	Burnaby	CCF	1956	1st term
Ernest Edward Winch	Burnaby	CCF	1933	8th term
Cedric Cox (1957)	Burnaby	CCF	1957	1st term
William Ralph Talbot Chetwynd	Cariboo	Social Credit	1952	3rd term
William Collins Speare (1957)	Cariboo	Social Credit	1957	1st term
William Kenneth Kiernan	Chilliwack	Social Credit	1952	3rd term
Richard Orr Newton	Columbia	Social Credit	1952, 1953	3rd term*
Daniel Robert John Campbell	Comox	Social Credit	1956	1st term
Robert Martin Strachan	Cowichan-Newcastle	CCF	1952	3rd term
Leo Thomas Nimsick	Cranbrook	CCF	1949	4th term
Thomas Irwin	Delta	Social Credit	1952	3rd term
Nehemiah George Massey	Delta	Social Credit	1956	1st term
Gordon Lionel Gibson (1957)	Delta	Social Credit	1957	1st term
Lyle Wicks	Dewdney	Social Credit	1952	3rd term
Herbert Joseph Bruch	Esquimalt	Social Credit	1953	2nd term
Thomas Aubert Uphill	Fernie	Labour	1920	11th term
Ray Gillis Williston	Fort George	Social Credit	1953	2nd term
Lois Mabel Haggen	Grand Forks-Greenwood	CCF	1956	1st term
Philip Arthur Gaglardi	Kamloops	Social Credit	1952	3rd term
Randolph Harding	Kaslo-Slocan	CCF	1945	5th term
Donald Frederick Robinson	Lillooet	Social Credit	1955	2nd term
Anthony John Gargrave	Mackenzie	CCF	1952	3rd term
Earle Cathers Westwood	Nanaimo and the Islands	Social Credit	1956	1st term
Wesley Drewett Black	Nelson-Creston	Social Credit	1952	3rd term
John McRae (Rae) Eddie	New Westminster	CCF	1952	3rd term
Lorne Shantz	North Okanagan	Social Credit	1952	3rd term
Harold Earl Roche	North Peace River	Social Credit	1956	1st term
John Melvin Bryan, Jr.	North Vancouver	Social Credit	1956	1st term
John Melvin Bryan, Jr.	North Vancouver	Independent	1956	1st term
John Melvin Bryan, Jr.	North Vancouver	Liberal	1956	1st term
Newton Phillips Steacy	North Vancouver	Social Credit	1956	1st term
Philip Archibald Gibbs	Oak Bay	Liberal	1952	3rd term
Cyril Morley Shelford	Omineca	Social Credit	1952	3rd term
William Harvey Murray	Prince Rupert	Social Credit	1956	1st term
Arvid Lundell	Revelstoke	Social Credit	1949, (Note: First elected as a Conservative) 1956	2nd term*
Robert Edward Sommers	Rossland-Trail	Social Credit	1952	3rd term
Donald Leslie Brothers (1958)	Rossland-Trail	Social Credit	1958	1st term
John Douglas Tidball Tisdalle	Saanich	Social Credit	1953	2nd term
James Allan Reid	Salmon Arm	Social Credit	1952	3rd term
Francis Xavier Richter	Similkameen	Social Credit	1953	2nd term
Hugh Addison Shirreff	Skeena	Social Credit	1956	1st term
William Andrew Cecil Bennett	South Okanagan	Social Credit	1941, 1949	6th term*
Stanley Carnell	South Peace River	Social Credit	1956	1st term
Eric Charles Fitzgerald Martin	Vancouver-Burrard	Social Credit	1952	3rd term
Bert Price	Vancouver-Burrard	Social Credit	1952	3rd term
Alexander Small Matthew	Vancouver Centre	Social Credit	1953	2nd term
Leslie Raymond Peterson	Vancouver Centre	Social Credit	1956	2nd term
Frederick Morton Sharp	Vancouver East	Social Credit	1956	1st term
Arthur James Turner	Vancouver East	CCF	1941	6th term
Thomas Audley Bate	Vancouver-Point Grey	Social Credit	1953	2nd term
Robert William Bonner	Vancouver-Point Grey	Social Credit	1952	3rd term
Buda Hosmer Brown	Vancouver-Point Grey	Social Credit	1956	1st term
William Neelands Chant	Victoria City	Social Credit	1953	2nd term
George Frederick Thompson Gregory	Victoria City	Liberal	1953	2nd term
John Donald Smith	Victoria City	Social Credit	1956	1st term
Irvine Finlay Corbett	Yale	Social Credit	1952	3rd term

== Party standings ==
Affiliation	Members
Social Credit	39
Co-operative Commonwealth	10
Liberal	2
Labour	1
Total	52
Government Majority	26

== By-elections ==
By-elections were held to replace members for various reasons:

Electoral district	Member elected	Party	Election date	Reason
Burnaby	Cedric Cox	CCF	September 9, 1957	death of E.E. Winch January 11, 1957
Cariboo	William Collins Speare	Social Credit	September 9, 1957	death of W.R.T. Chetwynd April 3, 1957
Delta	Gordon Lionel Gibson	Social Credit	September 9, 1957	T.J. Irwin resigned to contest federal election April 26, 1957
Rossland-Trail	Donald Leslie Brothers	Social Credit	December 15, 1958	R.E. Sommers resigned November 7, 1958; convicted of bribery and conspiracy

== Other changes ==
- John Melvin Bryan, Jr. becomes an Independent on February 3, 1958. He joins the Liberals on February 25, 1959.
- Oak Bay (dec. Philip Archibald Gibbs March 1960)
