= List of British Columbia CCF/NDP members =

This articles lists Wikipedia articles about members of the British Columbia, Canada, branch of the Co-operative Commonwealth Federation (CCF), a social democratic political party, and its successor, the British Columbia New Democratic Party (NDP).

- NOTE – Many BC seats have been multiple member ridings at various times.
- **Bold** denotes general elections won by the NDP.

== First elected in 1933 ==
The CCF won 7 of the 47 seats available in the Legislative Assembly of British Columbia in the 1933 provincial election:

- Ernest Winch – Burnaby 1933-1937-1941-1945-1949-1952-1953-1956-1957by (died, CCF won) father of Harold Winch
- Robert Swailes – Delta 1933 (quit CCF, joined "Social Constructives", CCF Won)
- Ernest Bakewell – Mackenzie 1933 (quit CCF, joined "Social Constructives", CCF lost)
- Harley Christian Erskine Anderson – North Vancouver 1933–1937 (retired, CCF won)
- Harold Winch – Vancouver East 1933-1937-1941-1945-1949-1952 (ran federally, CCF won) son of Ernest Winch
- John Price – Vancouver East 1933 (quit CCF, joined "Social Constructives", CCF won)
- Robert Connell – Anglican priest- Victoria City 1933 (expelled from CCF, formed Social Constructive Party, CCF lost)

== 1934 by-election ==
The CCF won a seat available in a 1934 by-election:

- Dorothy Steeves – North Vancouver 1934by-1937-1941-1945 (ran, CCF lost)

== First elected in 1937 ==
The CCF won 7 of the 48 seats available in the 1937 election:

- Colin Cameron – Comox 1937-1941-1945 (ran, CCF lost)
- Samuel Guthrie – Cowichan-Newcastle 1937-1941-1945-1949 (ran, CCF lost)
- Leonard Alec Shepherd – Delta 1937-1941-1945 (ran, CCF lost)
- James Lyle Telford – Vancouver East 1937–1941 (retired?, CCF won)

== 1939 by-election ==
The CCF won a seat available in a 1939 by-election:

- Laura Emma Marshall Jamieson – Vancouver Centre 1939by-1941-1945 (ran, CCF lost), 1952–1953 (ran, CCF lost)

== First elected in 1941 ==
The CCF won 14 of the 48 seats available in the 1941 election:

- Herbert Gargrave – Mackenzie 1941-1945-1949 (ran, CCF lost)
- Herbert Wilfred Herridge – Rossland-Trail 1941–1945 (resigned to run federally, CCF lost)
- Bernard George Webber – Similkameen 1941–1945 (ran, CCF lost)
- Grace MacInnis – Vancouver-Burrard 1941–1945 (ran, CCF lost)
- Charles Grant MacNeil – former MP – Vancouver-Burrard 1941–1945 (ran, CCF lost)
- Wallis Walter LeFeaux – Vancouver Centre 1941–1945 (ran, CCF lost)
- Arthur James Turner – Vancouver East 1941-1945-1949-1952-1953-1956-1960-1963-1966 (retired, NDP won)

== First elected in 1942 ==
The CCF won a seat available in a 1942 by-election:

- George Faulds Stirling – Salmon Arm 1942by-1945 (ran, CCF lost)

== First elected in 1943 ==
The CCF won a seat available in a 1943 by-election:

- Vincent Segur – Revelstoke 1943by-1945 (ran, CCF lost), 1952-1953-1956 (retired, CCF lost)

== First elected in 1945 ==
The CCF won 10 of the 48 seats available in the 1945 election:

- John McInnis – Fort George 1945–1949 (ran, CCF lost)
- Randolph Harding – Kaslo-Slocan 1945-1949-1952-1953-1956-1960-1963-1966, Revelstoke-Slocan 1966-1968by (ran federally, NDP won)
- Edward Fraser Rowland – Omineca 1945–1949 (ran, CCF lost)
- Joseph Hardcastle Corsbie – Peace River 1945–1949 (ran, CCF lost)
- William Henry Brett – Prince Rupert 1945–1949 (ran, CCF lost)

== First elected in 1948 ==
The CCF won a seat available in a 1948 by-election:

- James O'Donnell Quinn – Rossland-Trail 1948by-1949 (ran, CCF lost)

== First elected in 1949 ==
The CCF won 7 of the 48 seats available in the 1949 election:

- Frank Arthur Calder – Atlin 1949-1952-1953-1956 (ran, CCF lost), 1960-1963-1966-1969-1972-1975 (switched to Social Credit, NDP lost)
- Leo Thomas Nimsick – Cranbrook 1949-1952-1953-1956-1960-1963-1966, Kootenay 1966-1969-1972-1975 (retired, NDP lost)
- Rupert Haggen – Grand Forks-Greenwood 1949-1952-1953-1956 (retired, CCF won)

== First elected in 1951 ==
The CCF won a seat available in a 1951 by-election:

- Frank Mitchell – Esquimalt 1951by-1952-1953 (ran, CCF lost), Esquimalt-Port Renfrew 1979-1983-1986 (retired, NDP won)

== First elected in 1952 ==
The CCF won 18 of the 48 seats available in the 1952 general election:

- Stanley John Squire – Alberni 1952-1953-1956-1960-1963-1966 (ran, NDP lost)
- William Campbell Moore – Comox 1952-1953-1956 (?, CCF lost)
- Robert Martin Strachan – Cowichan-Newcastle 1952-1953-1956-1960-1963-1966, Cowichan-Malahat 1966-1969-1972-1975 (retired, NDP won)
- Anthony John Gargrave – Mackenzie 1952-1953-1956-1960-1963-1966 (ran, NDP lost)
- Rae Eddie – New Westminster 1952-1953-1956-1960-1963-1966-1969 (retired, NDP won)
- George Edwin Hills – Prince Rupert 1952–1953 (ran, CCF lost)
- Frank Snowsell – Saanich 1952–1953 (ran, CCF lost)
- James Campbell Bury – Vancouver Centre 1952–1953 (ran, CCF lost)

== First elected in 1953 ==
The CCF won 14 of the 48 seats available in the 1953 election:

- Frank Howard – logger/former MP – Skeena 1953–1957 (ran, CCF lost), 1979-1983-1986 (ran, NDP lost)
- Arnold Alexander Webster – Vancouver East 1953–1957 (?, CCF lost)

== First elected in 1956 ==
The CCF won 10 of the 52 seats available in the 1956 election:

- Gordon Dowding – Burnaby 1956-1960-1963-1966, Burnaby-Edmonds 1966-1969-1972-1975 (ran, NDP lost)
- Lois Haggen – Grand Forks-Greenwood 1956-1960-1963-1966 (ran, NDP lost)

== 1957 by-election ==
The CCF won a seat available in a 1957 by-election:

- Cedric Cox – Burnaby 1957by-1960-1963 (ran, NDP lost)

== First elected in 1960 ==
The CCF won 16 of the 52 seats available in the 1960 election:

- Camille Mather – Delta 1960–1963 (ran, NDP lost)
- James Henry Rhodes – Delta 1960–1963 (ran, NDP lost)
- Dave Barrett – Dewdney 1960-1963-1966, Coquitlam 1966-1969-1972-1975 (ran, NDP lost), Vancouver East 1976by-1979-1983-1984by
- George Hobbs – Revelstoke 1960-1962by (died, NDP won)
- Alexander Barrett MacDonald – Vancouver East 1960-1963-1966-1969-1972-1975-1979-1983-1986 (retired, NDP won)

== First elected in 1962 ==
The New Democratic Party, successor to the CCF, was founded in 1961 by the CCF, Canadian unions and members of New Party clubs. It won a seat available in a 1962 by-election:

- Margaret Francis Hobbs – Revelstoke 1962by-1963 (ran, NDP lost)

== First elected in 1963 ==
The NDP won 14 of the 52 seats available in the 1963 election:

- David Stupich – Nanaimo & the Islands 1963–1966, Nanaimo 1966–1969 (ran, NDP lost), 1972-1975-1979-1983-1986-1989by (ran federally, NDP won)
- William Leonard Hartley – Yale 1963–1966, Yale-Lillooet 1966-1969-1972-1975 (ran, NDP lost)

== First elected in 1966 ==
The NDP won 16 of the 55 seats available in the 1966 election:

- Eileen Dailly – Burnaby North 1966-1969-1972-1975-1979-1983-1986 (retired, NDP won)
- Fred Vulliamy – Burnaby-Willingdon 1966-1968by (died, NDP won)
- Ernest Hall – Surrey 1966-1969-1972-1975 (ran, NDP lost), 1979–1983 (ran, NDP lost)
- Thomas Rodney Berger – former MP – Vancouver-Burrard 1966–1969 (ran, NDP lost)
- Raymond Parkinson – Vancouver-Burrard 1966–1969 (ran, NDP lost)
- Robert Arthur Williams – Vancouver East 1966-1969-1972-1975-1976by (gave up seat for Dave Barrett, NDP won), 1984by-1986+

== First elected in 1968 ==
The NDP won 2 seats available in 1968 by-elections:

- Norman Levi – Vancouver South 1968by-1969 (ran, NDP lost), Vancouver Burrard 1972-1975-1979, Maillardville-Coquitlam 1979+
- William Stewart King – Revelstoke-Slocan 1968by-1969 (ran, NDP lost) 1972-1975-1979, Shuswap-Revelstoke 1979+

== First elected in 1969 ==
The NDP won a seat available in a 1969 by-election:

- James Gibson Lorimer – Burnaby-Willingdon 1969by-1969-1972-1975 (ran, NDP lost), 1979+

== First elected in 1969 ==
The NDP won 12 of the 55 seats available in the 1969 election:

- Dennis Cocke – New Westminster 1969-1972-1975-1979-1983-1986 (retired, NDP won)

== First elected in 1972 ==
The NDP won a majority of 38 of the 55 seats available in the 1972 election allowing the NDP to form its first government in the province, with Dave Barrett as Premier. The landslide victory first elected the following New Democrats:

- Robert Skelly – Alberni 1972-1975-1979-1983-1986-1988by (retired, NDP won)
- Karen Sanford – Comox 1972-1975-1979-1983+
- Carl Liden – Delta 1972–1975 (ran, NDP lost)
- Peter Rolston – Dewdney 1972–1975 (ran, NDP lost)
- James Henry Gorst – Esquimalt 1972–1975 (?, NDP lost)
- Allan Alfred Nunweiler – Fort George 1972–1975 (ran, NDP lost)
- Gerald Hamilton Anderson – Kamloops 1972–1975 (ran, NDP lost)
- Don Lockstead – Mackenzie 1972-1975-1979-1983-1986 (ran, NDP lost)
- Lorne Nicolson – Nelson-Creston 1972-1975-1979-1983+
- Colin Gabelmann – North Vancouver-Seymour 1972–1975 (ran, NDP lost), North Island 1979-1983-1986-1991-1996 (retired, NDP won)
- Douglas Tynwald Kelly – Omineca 1972–1975 (ran, NDP lost)
- Graham Lea – Prince Rupert 1972-1975-1979-1983-1985 (left NDP in 1985, did not run in 1986, NDP won)
- Harold Leslie Steves – Richmond 1972–1975 (ran, NDP lost)
- Christopher D'Arcy – Rossland-Trail 1972-1975-1979-1983-1986+
- Donald Emerson Lewis – Shuswap 1972–1975 (ran, NDP lost)
- Hartley Douglas Dent – Skeena 1972–1975 (ran, NDP lost)
- Rosemary Brown – Vancouver-Burrard 1972-1975-1979, Burnaby-Edmonds 1979-1983-1986 (retired, NDP lost)
- Emery Barnes – Vancouver Centre 1972-1975-1979-1983-1986-1991-1996 (retired, NDP won)
- Gary Lauk – Vancouver Centre 1972-1975-1979-1983-1986 (retired, NDP won)
- Roy Thomas Cummings – Vancouver-Little Mountain 1972–1975 (ran, NDP lost)
- Phyllis Florence Young – Vancouver-Little Mountain 1972–1975 (ran, NDP lost)
- Jack Radford – Vancouver South 1972–1975 (ran, NDP lost)
- Daisy Webster – Vancouver South 1972–1975 (did not run, NDP lost)

== First elected in 1975 ==
The NDP won 18 of the 55 seats available in the 1975 election:

- Barbara Wallace – Cowichan-Malahat 1975-1979-1983-1986 (retired, NDP lost)
- Charles Frederick Barber – Victoria 1975-1979-1983 (retired, NDP won)

== First elected in 1979 ==
The NDP won 26 of the 57 seats available in the 1979 election:

- Al Passarell – Atlin 1979-1983-1985 (crossed to Social Credit 1985, died 1986, NDP won)
- Stuart Malcolm Leggatt – former MP – Coquitlam-Moody 1979–1983 (?, NDP won)
- Gordon William Hanson – Victoria 1979-1983-1986-1991 (retired, NDP won)

== First elected in 1983 ==
The NDP won 22 of the 57 seats available in the 1983 election:

- Mark Rose – former MP – Coquitlam-Moody 1983-1986-1991 (retired, NDP Won)
- Robin Blencoe – Victoria 1983-1986-1991-1995* (Sat as Independent 1995–1996) (did not run, NDP won)

== First elected in 1984 ==
The NDP won a seat available in a 1984 by-election:

- Lyle MacWilliam – Okanagan North 1984by-1986 (ran, NDP lost)

== First elected in 1986 ==
The NDP won 22 of the 69 seats available in the 1986 election:

- Larry Guno – Atlin 1986–1991 (ridings merged)
- Barry Jones – Burnaby North 1986-1991-1996 (retired, NDP won)
- Moe Sihota – Esquimalt-Port Renfrew 1986–1991, Esquimalt-Metchosin 1991-1996-2001 (retired, NDP lost)
- Anne Edwards – Kootenay 1986-1991-1996 (retired, NDP won)
- John Cashore – Maillardville-Coquitlam 1986–1991, Coquitlam-Maillardville 1991-1996-2001 (retired, NDP lost)
- Dale Lovick – Nanaimo 1986-1991-1996-2001 (retired, NDP lost)
- Anita Hagen – New Westminster 1986-1991-1996 (retired, NDP won)
- Lois Boone – Prince George North 1986–1991, Prince George-Mount Robson 1991-1996-2001 (retired, NDP lost)
- Dan Miller – Prince Rupert 1986–1991, North Coast 1991-1996-2001 (retired, NDP lost)
- Joan Smallwood – Surrey-Guildford Whalley 1986–1991, Surrey-Whalley 1991-1996-2001 (ran, NDP lost)
- Michael Harcourt – Vancouver Centre 1986–1991, Vancouver Mount Pleasant 1991–1996 (retired, NDP won)
- Glen Clark – Vancouver East 1986–1991, Vancouver Kingsway 1991-1996-2001 (retired, NDP lost)
- Darlene Marzari – Vancouver-Point Grey 1986-1991-1996 (did not run, NDP lost)

== First elected in 1988 ==
The NDP won 2 seats available in 1988 by-elections:

- Bill Barlee – Boundary-Similkameen 1988by—1991, Okanagan-Boundary 1991–1996 (ran, NDP lost)
- Gerard Janssen – Alberni 1988by-1991-1996-2001 (ran, NDP lost)

== First elected in 1989 ==
The NDP won 4 seats available in 1989 by-elections:

- Jan Pullinger – Nanaimo 1989by-1991, Cowichan-Ladysmith 1991-1996-2001 (retired, NDP lost)
- Tom Perry – Vancouver Point Grey 1989by-1991, Vancouver Little Mountain 1991–1996 (riding renamed, retired, NDP lost)
- David Zirnhelt – Cariboo 1989by-1991, Cariboo South 1991-1996-2001 (ran, NDP lost)
- Elizabeth Cull – Oak Bay-Gordon Head 1989by-1991-1996 (ran, NDP lost)

== First elected in 1991 ==
The NDP won 51 of the 75 seats available in the 1991 election. Returning the party to power with a majority government led by Mike Harcourt as Premier. Newly elected members include:

- Jackie Pement – Bulkley Valley-Stikine 1991–1996 (did not run, NDP Won) later became a Liberal
- Fred Randall – Burnaby Edmonds 1991-1996-2001 (retired, NDP lost)
- Joan Sawicki – Burnaby-Willingdon 1991-1996-2001 (retired, NDP lost)
- Frank Garden – Cariboo North 1991–1996 (ran, NDP lost)
- Jim Doyle – Columbia River-Revelstoke 1991-1996-2001 (ran, NDP lost)
- Margaret Lord – Comox Valley 1991–1996 (did not run, NDP won)
- Norm Lortie – Delta North 1991–1996 (ran, NDP lost)
- Arthur Charbonneau – Kamloops 1991–1996 (did not run, NDP won)
- Frederick H. Jackson – Kamloops North Thompson 1991–1996 (ran, NDP lost)
- Rick Kasper – Malahat-Juan de Fuca 1991-1996-2000 (sat as independent 2000–2001)
- Dennis Streifel – Mission-Kent 1991-1996-2001 (riding renamed, retired, NDP lost)
- Bill Hartley – Maple Ridge-Pitt Meadows 1991-1996-2001 (ran, NDP lost)
- Leonard Krog – Parksville-Qualicum 1991–1996 (ran, NDP lost), Nanaimo 2005–2018
- Corky Evans – Nelson-Creston 1991-1996-2001 (ran, NDP lost), 2005+
- David Schreck – North Vancouver-Lonsdale 1991–1996 (ran, NDP lost)
- Jim Beattie – Okanagan-Penticton 1991–1996 (ran, NDP lost)
- Mike Farnworth – Port Coquitlam 1991-1996-2001 (ran, NDP lost), Port Coquitlam-Burke Mountain 2005+
- Barbara Copping Port Moody-Burnaby Mountain 1991–1996 (did not run, NDP lost)
- Paul Ramsey – Prince George North 1991-1996-2001 (riding renamed, retired, NDP lost)
- Ed Conroy – Rossland-Trail 1991-1996-2001 (ran in renamed riding of West Kootenay-Boundary, NDP lost)
- Andrew Petter – Saanich South 1991-1996-2001 (retired, NDP lost)
- Shannon O'Neill – Shuswap 1991–1996 (did not run, NDP lost)
- Helmut Giesbrecht – Skeena 1991-1996-2001 (ran, NDP lost)
- Sue Hammell – Surrey Green Timbers 1991-1996-2001 (ran, NDP lost), 2005–2009-2013-2017 (retired, NDP hold)
- Penny Priddy – Surrey Newton 1991-1996-2001 (retired, NDP lost)
- Bernie Simpson – Vancouver Fairview 1991–1996 (riding renamed, did not run)
- Joy MacPhail – Vancouver Hastings 1991-1996-2001-2005 (retired, NDP won)
- Ujjal Dosanjh – Vancouver Kensington 1991-1996-2001 (ran, NDP lost)
- Harry Lali – Yale-Lillooet 1991-1996-2001 (did not run, NDP lost), 2005 Fraser-Nicola 2009–2013
- Gretchen Brewin – Victoria-Beacon Hill 1991-1996-2001 (retired, NDP lost)

== First elected in 1996 ==
The NDP won 39 of the 75 seats available in the 1996 election, retaining its majority government under the leadership of Premier Glen Clark.

- Bill Goodacre – Bulkley Valley-Stikine 1996–2001 (ran, NDP lost)
- Pietro Calendino – Burnaby North 1996–2001 (ran, NDP lost)
- Evelyn Gillespie – Comox Valley 1996–2001 (ran, NDP lost)
- Erda Walsh – Kootenay 1996–2001 (ran in East Kootenay, NDP lost)
- Cathy McGregor – Kamloops 1996–2001 (ran, NDP lost)
- Graeme Bowbrick – New Westminster 1996–2001 (ran, NDP lost)
- Glenn Robertson – North Island 1996–2001 (ran, NDP lost)
- Tim Stevenson – Vancouver Burrard 1996–2001 (ran, NDP lost)
- Ian Waddell – former MP, Community Lawyer – Vancouver Fraserview 1996–2001 (ran, NDP lost)
- Jenny Kwan – Vancouver-Mount Pleasant 1996-2001-2005–2015 (elected to House of Commons as a Member of Parliament)
- Steve Orcherton – Victoria-Hillside 1996–2001 (ran, NDP lost)

== First elected in 1999 ==
The NDP won a seat available in a 1999 by-election:

- Gordon Wilson – Powell River-Sunshine Coast (crossed the floor, switched to NDP) 1999–2001 (ran, NDP lost)

== First elected in 2001 ==
The NDP won 2 of the 79 seats available in the 2001 election.

== First elected in 2004 ==
The NDP won a seat available in a 2004 by-election:

- Jagrup Brar – Surrey-Panorama Ridge 2004by-2005–2009, Surrey-Fleetwood, 2009–2013 (ran 2013, NDP lost), returned 2017–present

== First elected in 2005 ==
The NDP won 34 of the 79 seats available in the 2005 election:

- Scott Fraser – Alberni-Qualicum 2005–2009-2013-2017 (retired 2020, NDP hold)
- Raj Chouhan – Burnaby-Edmonds 2005–2007-2009-2013-2017-2020–present
- Bob Simpson – Cariboo North 2005–2007-2009 (removed from caucus 2010, defeated 2013, NDP lost)
- Charlie Wyse – Cariboo South 2005–2007 (ran 2009, NDP lost)
- Norm Macdonald – Columbia River-Revelstoke 2005–2007-2009-2013 (retired 2017, NDP lost)
- Diane Thorne – Coquitlam-Maillardville 2005-2007-2009 (retired 2013, NDP hold)
- Doug Routley – Cowichan-Ladysmith 2005–2007 Nanaimo-North Cowichan 2009-2013-2017-2020–present
- Guy Gentner – Delta North 2005–2007-2009 (retired 2013, NDP lost)
- Maurine Karagianis – Esquimalt-Metchosin 2007-2009-2013 (retired 2017, NDP hold)
- John Horgan – Malahat-Juan de Fuca 2005–2007-2009-2013-2017-2020–present
- Michael Sather – Maple Ridge-Pitt Meadows 2005–2007-2009 (retired 2013, NDP lost)
- Chuck Puchmayr – New Westminster 2005–2007 (retired 2009, NDP hold)
- Gary Coons – North Coast 2005–2007-2009 (retired 2013, NDP hold)
- Claire Trevena – North Island 2005–2007-2009-2013-2017 (retired 2020, NDP hold)
- Nicholas Simons – Powell River-Sunshine Coast 2005–2007-2009-2013-2017-2020–present
- David Cubberley – Saanich South 2005–2007 (retired 2009, NDP hold)
- Robin Austin – Skeena 2005–2007-2009-2013 (retired 2017, NDP lost)
- Harry Bains – Surrey-Newton 2005–2007-2009-2013-2017-2020–present
- Bruce Ralston – Surrey-Whalley 2005–2007-2009-2013-2017-2020–present
- Katrine Conroy – West Kootenay-Boundary 2005–2007 Kootenay West 2009-2013-2017-2020–present
- Gregor Robertson – Vancouver-Fairview 2005–2007 (resigned 2008 to run for mayor of Vancouver, NDP hold)
- Shane Simpson – Vancouver-Hastings 2005–2007-2009-2013-2017 (retired 2020, NDP hold)
- David Chudnovsky – Vancouver-Kensington 2005–2007 (retired 2009, NDP hold)
- Adrian Dix – Vancouver-Kingsway 2005–2007-2009-2013-2017-2020–present
- Carole James – Victoria-Beacon Hill 2005–present
- Rob Fleming – Victoria-Hillside 2005–2007-2009-2013-2017-2020–present

== First elected in 2008 ==
- Spencer Chandra Herbert, Vancouver-Burrard, 2008by, Vancouver-West End, 2009-2013-2017-2020–present
- Jenn McGinn Vancouver-Fairview, 2008by-2009 (defeated)

== First elected in 2009 ==
The NDP won 35 seats for a net gain of 2. In 2010, Bob Simpson left the NDP to become an independent leaving the NDP with 34 seats.

- Dawn Black, New Westminster, 2009–2013 (retired, NDP hold)
- Kathy Corrigan, Burnaby-Deer Lake, 2009–2013-2017 (retired, NDP hold)
- Doug Donaldson, Stikine, 2009–2013–2017-2020 (retired, NDP hold)
- Mable Elmore, Vancouver-Kensington, 2009–2013–2017-2020–present
- Michelle Mungall, Nelson-Creston, 2009–2013–2017-2020 (retired, NDP hold)
- Lana Popham, Saanich South, 2009–2013–2017-2020–present
- Bill Routley, Cowichan Valley, 2009–2013–2017 (retired, NDP lost)

== First elected in 2012 ==
The NDP gained 2 seats in by-elections

- Gwen O'Mahony 2012by-2013 (defeated)
- Joe Trasolini, 2012by-2013 (defeated)

== First elected in 2013 ==
The NDP won 34 seats for a net loss of 2.

- Jennifer Rice, North Coast, 2013-2017-2020–present
- Jane Shin, Burnaby-Lougheed, 2013–2017 (retired, NDP hold)
- Selina Robinson, Coquitlam-Maillardville, 2013-2017-2020–2024
- Judy Darcy, New Westminster, 2013–2018-2020 (retired, NDP hold)
- George Heyman, Vancouver-Fairview, 2013-2017-2020–present
- David Eby, Vancouver-Point Grey, 2013-2017-2020–present
- Gary Holman, Saanich North and the Islands, 2013–2017 (defeated)

== First elected in 2016 by-elections ==
- Melanie Mark, Vancouver-Mount Pleasant (NDP hold) 2016by-2017-2020–present
- Jodie Wickens, Coquitlam-Burke Mountain (NDP gain) 2016by—2017 (defeated)

== First elected in 2017 ==
The 2017 election resulted in the first minority parliament since 1952, with the NDP winning the second highest share of seats. However, the party managed to form a legislative agreement with the Green Party. This allowed new leader John Horgan to become Premier, leading the province's third NDP government. New members elected to this parliament:

- Lisa Beare, Maple Ridge-Pitt Meadows, 2017-2020–present
- Garry Begg, Surrey-Guildford, 2017-2020–present
- Katrina Chen, Burnaby-Lougheed, 2017-2020–present
- George Chow, Vancouver-Fraserview, 2017-2020–present
- Bob D'Eith, Maple Ridge-Mission, 2017-2020–present
- Rick Glumac, Port Moody-Coquitlam, 2017-2020–present
- Ravi Kahlon, Delta North, 2017-2020–present
- Anne Kang, Burnaby-Deer Lake, 2017-2020–present
- Ronna-Rae Leonard, Courtenay-Comox, 2017-2020–present
- Bowinn Ma, North Vancouver-Lonsdale, 2017-2020–present
- Janet Routledge, Burnaby North, 2017-2020–present
- Jinny Sims, Surrey-Panorama, 2017-2020–present
- Rachna Singh, Surrey-Green Timbers, 2017-2020–present

== First elected in 2019 ==
- Sheila Malcolmson (by election) – Nanaimo (NDP hold), 2019-2020–present

== First elected in 2020 ==
The 2020 British Columbia general election resulted in an NDP majority government under John Horgan. 57 NDP MLAs were elected, a net increase of 16. 22 new NDP MLAs were elected.

- Nathan Cullen, former NDP MP, Stikine, 2020—2024
- Brittny Anderson, Nelson-Creston, 2020—present
- Roly Russell, Boundary-Similkameen, 2020—2024
- Harwinder Sandhu, Vernon-Monashee, 2020—present
- Pam Alexis, Abbotsford-Mission, 2020—2024
- Dan Coulter, Chilliwack, 2020—2024
- Kelli Paddon, Chilliwack-Kent, 2020—present
- Andrew Mercier, Langley, 2020—present
- Megan Dykeman, Langley East, 2020—present
- Mike Starchuk, Surrey-Cloverdale, 2020—present
- Aman Singh, Richmond-Queensborough, 2020—present
- Henry Yao, Richmond South Centre, 2020—present
- Fin Donnelly, former NDP MP, Coquitlam-Burke Mountain, 2020—present
- Jennifer Whiteside, New Westminster, 2020—present
- Brenda Bailey, Vancouver-False Creek, 2020—present
- Niki Sharma, Vancouver-Hastings, 2020—present
- Susie Chant, North Vancouver-Seymour, 2020—present
- Josie Osborne, Mid Island-Pacific Rim, 2020—present
- Michele Babchuk, North Island, 2020—present
- Adam Walker, Parksville-Qualicum, 2020—present
- Murray Rankin, former NDP MP, Oak Bay-Gordon Head, 2020—2024
- Grace Lore, Victoria-Beacon Hill, 2020—present

== First elected in 2024 ==
The 2024 British Columbia general election resulted in an NDP majority government under David Eby. 47 NDP MLAs were elected, a net decrease of 10. 16 new NDP MLAs were elected. 1 was elected in 2024 as an MLA for a different party before joining the BC NDP between elections.

- Reah Arora, Burnaby East
- Jennifer Blatherwick, Coquitlam-Maillardville
- Amelia Boultbee, Penticton-Summerland
- Christine Boyle, Vancouver-Little Mountain
- Paul Choi, Burnaby South-Metrotown
- Tamara Davidson, North Coast-Haida Gwaii
- Sunita Dhir, Vancouver-Langara
- Diana Gibson, Oak Bay-Gordon Head
- Stephanie Higginson, Ladysmith-Oceanside
- Nina Krieger, Victoria-Swan Lake
- Dana Lajeunesse, Juan de Fuca-Malahat
- Steve Morissette, Kootenay-Monashee
- Randene Neill, Powell River-Sunshine Coast
- Darlene Rotchford, Esquimalt-Colwood
- Amna Shah, Surrey City Centre
- Jessie Sunner, Surrey-Newton
- Debra Toporowski, Cowichan Valley

== First elected in 2026 ==
TBD NDP MLAs were elected, a net decrease of TBD. TBD new NDP MLAs were elected.

== Articles on prominent NDPers/CCFers at the municipal level ==
Burnaby

- Derek Corrigan – Mayor of Burnaby
- Joe Keithley – Burnaby city councillor since 2018. Crossed the floor to the BCA from the Burnaby Green Party in 2025.
- Bob Prittie – Mayor of Burnaby from 1969–1973. Previously served as a Member of Parliament for Burnaby—Richmond.

Other

- Helena Gutteridge – first woman elected to Vancouver City Council, 1937.
- Patrick Johnstone – New Westminster city councillor 2014–2022, mayor of New Westminster 2022–present

== See also ==
- List of articles about CCF/NDP members
- List of articles about Alberta CCF/NDP members
- List of articles about Saskatchewan CCF/NDP members
- List of articles about Manitoba CCF/NDP members
- List of articles about Ontario CCF/NDP members
- List of articles about Nova Scotia CCF/NDP members
- List of articles about Yukon NDP members
