= 26th Parliament of British Columbia =

The 26th Legislative Assembly of British Columbia sat from 1961 to 1963. The members were elected in the British Columbia general election held in September 1960. The Social Credit Party led by W. A. C. Bennett formed the government. The Co-operative Commonwealth Federation (CCF) led by Robert Strachan formed the official opposition.

Lorne Shantz served as speaker for the assembly.

== Members of the 26th Parliament ==
The following members were elected to the assembly in 1960:

Member	Electoral district	Party	First elected / previously elected	No.# of term(s)
Stanley John Squire	Alberni	CCF	1952	4th term
Stanley John Squire	Alberni	NDP	1952	4th term
Frank Arthur Calder	Atlin	CCF	1949, 1960	4th term*
Frank Arthur Calder	Atlin	NDP	1949, 1960	4th term*
Cedric Cox	Burnaby	CCF	1957	2nd term
Cedric Cox	Burnaby	NDP	1957	2nd term
Gordon Dowding	Burnaby	CCF	1956	2nd term
Gordon Dowding	Burnaby	NDP	1956	2nd term
William Collins Speare	Cariboo	Social Credit	1957	2nd term
William Kenneth Kiernan	Chilliwack	Social Credit	1952	4th term
Richard Orr Newton	Columbia	Social Credit	1952, 1953	4th term*
Frank Greenwood (1963) (Note: Election called before member took seat)	Columbia	Social Credit	1963	1st term
Daniel Robert John Campbell	Comox	Social Credit	1956	2nd term
Robert Martin Strachan	Cowichan-Newcastle	CCF	1952	4th term
Robert Martin Strachan	Cowichan-Newcastle	NDP	1952	4th term
Leo Thomas Nimsick	Cranbrook	CCF	1949	5th term
Leo Thomas Nimsick	Cranbrook	NDP	1949	5th term
Camille Mather	Delta	CCF	1960	1st term
Camille Mather	Delta	NDP	1960	1st term
James Henry Rhodes	Delta	CCF	1960	1st term
James Henry Rhodes	Delta	NDP	1960	1st term
David Barrett	Dewdney	CCF	1960	1st term
David Barrett	Dewdney	NDP	1960	1st term
Herbert Joseph Bruch	Esquimalt	Social Credit	1953	3rd term
Henry Cartmell (Harry) McKay	Fernie	Liberal	1960	1st term
Ray Gillis Williston	Fort George	Social Credit	1953	3rd term
Lois Mabel Haggen	Grand Forks-Greenwood	CCF	1956	2nd term
Lois Mabel Haggen	Grand Forks-Greenwood	NDP	1956	2nd term
Philip Arthur Gaglardi	Kamloops	Social Credit	1952	4th term
Randolph Harding	Kaslo-Slocan	CCF	1945	6th term
Randolph Harding	Kaslo-Slocan	NDP	1945	6th term
Donald Frederick Robinson	Lillooet	Social Credit	1955	3rd term
Anthony John Gargrave	Mackenzie	CCF	1952	4th term
Anthony John Gargrave	Mackenzie	NDP	1952	4th term
Earle Cathers Westwood	Nanaimo and the Islands	Social Credit	1956	2nd term
Wesley Drewett Black	Nelson-Creston	Social Credit	1952	4th term
John McRae (Rae) Eddie	New Westminster	CCF	1952	4th term
John McRae (Rae) Eddie	New Westminster	NDP	1952	4th term
Lorne Shantz	North Okanagan	Social Credit	1952	4th term
Jacob Francis Huhn	North Peace River	Social Credit	1960	1st term
James Gordon Gibson	North Vancouver	Liberal	1953, (Note: Lillooet) 1960	2nd term*
Raymond Joseph Perrault	North Vancouver	Liberal	1960	1st term
Alan Brock MacFarlane	Oak Bay	Liberal	1960	1st term
Cyril Morley Shelford	Omineca	Social Credit	1952	4th term
William Harvey Murray	Prince Rupert	Social Credit	1956	2nd term
George Hobbs	Revelstoke	CCF	1960	1st term
George Hobbs	Revelstoke	NDP	1960	1st term
Margaret Frances Hobbs (1962)	Revelstoke	NDP	1962	1st term
Donald Leslie Brothers	Rossland-Trail	Social Credit	1958	2nd term
John Douglas Tidball Tisdalle	Saanich	Social Credit	1953	3rd term
Willis Franklin Jefcoat	Salmon Arm	Social Credit	1960	1st term
Francis Xavier Richter	Similkameen	Social Credit	1953	3rd term
Dudley George Little	Skeena	Social Credit	1960	1st term
William Andrew Cecil Bennett	South Okanagan	Social Credit	1941, (Note: First elected as a Conservative) 1949	7th term*
Stanley Carnell	South Peace River	Social Credit	1956	2nd term
Eric Charles Fitzgerald Martin	Vancouver-Burrard	Social Credit	1952	4th term
Bert Price	Vancouver-Burrard	Social Credit	1952	4th term
Alexander Small Matthew	Vancouver Centre	Social Credit	1953	3rd term
Leslie Raymond Peterson	Vancouver Centre	Social Credit	1956	3rd term
Alexander Barrett MacDonald	Vancouver East	CCF	1960	1st term
Alexander Barrett MacDonald	Vancouver East	NDP	1960	1st term
Arthur James Turner	Vancouver East	CCF	1941	7th term
Arthur James Turner	Vancouver East	NDP	1941	7th term
Thomas Audley Bate	Vancouver-Point Grey	Social Credit	1953	3rd term
Robert William Bonner	Vancouver-Point Grey	Social Credit	1952	4th term
Buda Hosmer Brown	Vancouver-Point Grey	Social Credit	1953	3rd term
Patrick Lucey McGeer (1962)	Vancouver-Point Grey	Liberal	1962	1st term
William Neelands Chant	Victoria City	Social Credit	1953	3rd term
Waldo McTavish Skillings	Victoria City	Social Credit	1960	1st term
John Donald Smith	Victoria City	Social Credit	1956	2nd term
Irvine Finlay Corbett	Yale	Social Credit	1952	4th term

== Party standings ==
Affiliation	Members
Social Credit	32
Co-operative Commonwealth	16
Liberal	4
Total	52
Government Majority	12

== By-elections ==
By-elections were held to replace members for various reasons:

Electoral district	Member elected	Party	Election date	Reason
Revelstoke	Margaret Frances Hobbs	CCF	September 4, 1962	death of G. Hobbs January 30, 1962
Vancouver-Point Grey	Patrick Lucey McGeer	Liberal	December 17, 1962	death of B.H. Brown August 12, 1962
Columbia	Frank Greenwood (Note: Election called before member took seat)	Social Credit	July 15, 1963	death of R.O. Newton February 14, 1963
