= 1956 British Columbia general election =

Canadian provincial election

← 1953	September 19, 1956	1960 →

52 seats of the Legislative Assembly of British Columbia 27 seats were needed for a majority
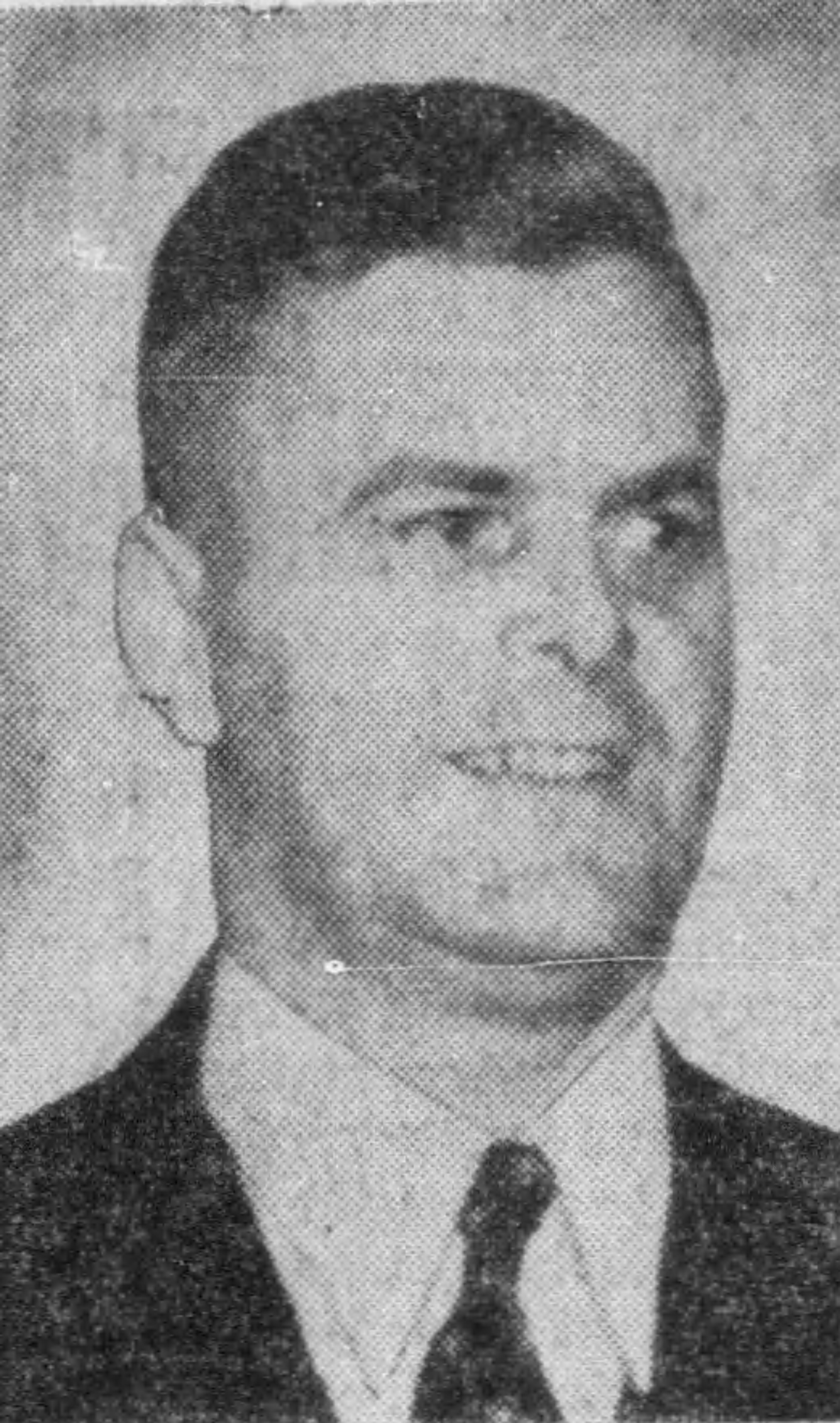

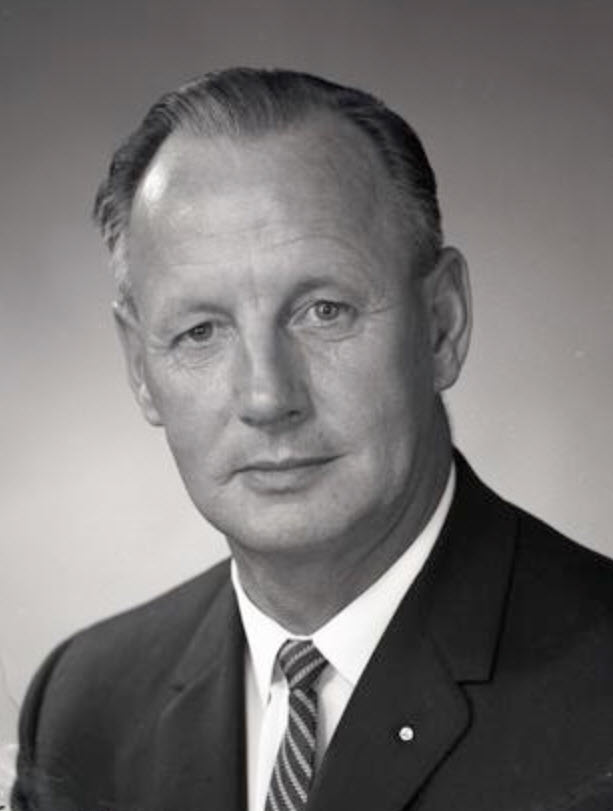

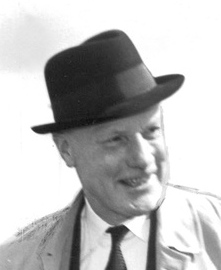
	First party	Second party	Third party
Leader	W. A. C. Bennett	Robert Strachan	Arthur Laing
Party	Social Credit	CCF	Liberal
Leader since	1952	1956	1953
Leader's seat	South Okanagan	Cowichan-Newcastle	Vancouver-Point Grey (lost re-election)
Last election	28	14	4
Seats won	39	10	2
Seat change	▲11	▼4	▼2
Popular vote	374,711	231,511	177,922
Percentage	45.84%	28.32%	21.77%
Swing	▲8.09	▼2.53	▼1.82
Premier before election
W. A. C. Bennett
Social Credit
Premier after election
W. A. C. Bennett
Social Credit

The 1956 British Columbia general election was the 25th general election in the province of British Columbia, Canada. It was held to elect members of the Legislative Assembly of British Columbia. The election was called on August 13, 1956, and held on September 19, 1956. The new legislature met for the first time on February 7, 1957.

The conservative Social Credit of Premier W.A.C. Bennett was re-elected with a majority in the legislature to a third term in government with over 45% of the popular vote.

The social democratic CCF formed the official opposition.

The British Columbia Liberal Party lost two of its four seats despite winning over 20% of the popular vote.

The Progressive Conservative Party lost its single seat in the legislature, and would not win a seat again until the 1972 election.

One seat was won by a Labour candidate, Tom Uphill of Fernie.

== Changes to election laws ==
In 1953, as part of a revision to the Provincial Elections Act, the voting age was reduced from 21 to 19. As well, the instant runoff voting system that was in effect for the 1952 and 1953 elections was abolished, and the previous system—mixture of block voting in multi-member districts and single-winner first past the post—was revived.

In 1955, a further Act was passed that increased the Legislative from 48 members to 52 through the following changes:

- Peace River was split into North Peace River and South Peace River
- Burnaby, Delta and North Vancouver became multi-member districts, each now returning two members.

== Results ==
Elections to the 25th Legislative Assembly of British Columbia (1956)
Political party	Party leader	MLAs				Votes (Note: Measured against 1953 first-preference votes.)			
Political party	Party leader	Candidates	1953	1956	±	#	±	%	± (pp)
Social Credit	W.A.C. Bennett	52	28	39	11▲	374,711	99,940▲	45.84	8.09▲
Co-operative Commonwealth	Bob Strachan	51	14	10	4▼	231,511	6,998▲	28.32	2.53▼
Liberal	Arthur Laing	52	4	2	2▼	177,922	6,161▲	21.77	1.82▼
Progressive Conservative	Deane Finlayson	22	1	–	1▼	25,373	15,407▼	3.11	2.49▼
Labour	Tom Uphill	1	1	1	Steady	1,321	280▼	0.16	0.06▼
Labour Progressive		14	–	–	–	3,381	4,115▼	0.41	0.62▼
Independent		7	–	–	–	3,178	1,207▲	0.39	0.12▲
Total		199	48	52		817,397		100.00%	
Rejected ballots						6,642	37,124▼		
Actual voters who voted						509,409	12,643▼	65.43%	5.12▼
Registered voters						778,587	38,581▲		

Seats and popular vote by party
Party	Seats	Votes	Change (pp)
█ Social Credit	39 / 52	45.84%	8.09
█ Co-operative Commonwealth	10 / 52	28.52%	-2.53
█ Liberal	2 / 52	21.77%	-1.82
█ Progressive Conservative	0 / 52	3.11%	-2.49
█ Other	1 / 52	0.76%	-1.25

== MLAs elected ==
**Single-member districts**

Alberni: Stanley John Squire
Atlin: William James Asselstine
Cariboo: Ralph Chetwynd
Chilliwack: William Kenneth Kiernan
Columbia: Richard Orr Newton
Comox: Daniel Campbell
Cowichan-Newcastle: Robert Strachan
Cranbrook: Leo Nimsick
Dewdney: Lyle Wicks
Esquimalt: Herbert Joseph Bruch
Fernie: Thomas Aubert Uphill
Fort George: Ray Gillis Williston
Grand Forks-Greenwood: Lois Haggen
Kamloops: Phil Gaglardi
Kaslo-Slocan: Randolph Harding
Lillooet: Don Robinson
Mackenzie: Anthony Gargrave
Nanaimo and the Islands: Earle Cathers Westwood
Nelson-Creston: Wesley Drewett Black
New Westminster: Rae Eddie
North Okanagan: Lorne Shantz
North Peace River: Harold Earl Roche
Oak Bay: Philip Archibald Gibbs
Omineca: Cyril Morley Shelford
Prince Rupert: William Harvey Murray
Revelstoke: Arvid Lundell
Rossland-Trail: Robert Sommers
Saanich: John Douglas Tisdalle
Salmon Arm: James Allan Reid
Similkameen: Frank Richter, Jr.
Skeena: Hugh Shirreff
South Okanagan: W. A. C. Bennett
South Peace River: Stanley Carnell
Yale: Irvine Finlay Corbett

**Multi-member districts**

Burnaby: Gordon Dowding
Burnaby: Ernest Winch (Note: Died before the opening of the new Legislative Assembly. His son-in-law Cedric Cox won the subsequent byelection.)
Delta: Thomas Irwin
Delta: Nehemiah George Massey
North Vancouver: John Melvin Bryan Sr.
North Vancouver: Newton Phillips Steacy
Vancouver-Burrard: Eric Charles Fitzgerald Martin
Vancouver-Burrard: Bert Price
Vancouver Centre: Alexander Small Matthew
Vancouver Centre: Leslie Peterson
Vancouver East: Frederick Morton Sharp
Vancouver East: Arthur James Turner
Vancouver-Point Grey: Thomas Audley Bate
Vancouver-Point Grey: Buda Brown
Vancouver-Point Grey: Arthur Laing
Victoria City: William Chant
Victoria City: John Donald Smith
Victoria City: George Frederick Thompson Gregory

=== Synopsis of results ===
Results by riding - 1956 British Columbia general election (single-member districts)
Riding	Winning party						Votes						
Name	1953	Party	Votes	Share	Margin #	Margin %	SC	CCF	Lib	PC	LPP	Ind	Total
Alberni	CCF	CCF	3,362	50.60%	1,468	22.09%	1,894	3,362	1,388	–	–	–	6,644
Atlin	CCF	SC	454	48.04%	94	9.94%	454	360	131	–	–	–	945
Cariboo	SC	SC	3,014	60.86%	1,873	37.82%	3,014	797	1,141	–	–	–	4,952
Chilliwack	SC	SC	9,008	57.10%	5,890	37.34%	9,008	2,992	3,118	658	–	–	15,776
Columbia	SC	SC	1,074	54.41%	422	21.38%	1,074	248	652	–	–	–	1,974
Comox	CCF	SC	4,916	41.63%	361	3.06%	4,916	4,555	2,339	–	–	–	11,810
Cowichan-Newcastle	CCF	CCF	5,015	51.18%	1,842	18.80%	3,173	5,015	1,611	–	–	–	9,799
Cranbrook	CCF	CCF	3,321	53.26%	1,309	20.99%	2,012	3,321	902	–	–	–	6,235
Dewdney	SC	SC	10,267	47.49%	3,056	14.14%	10,267	7,211	4,141	–	–	–	21,619
Esquimalt	SC	SC	3,530	43.70%	1,517	18.78%	3,530	2,013	1,714	821	–	–	8,078
Fernie	Lab	Lab	1,321	42.43%	140	4.49%	1,181	–	611	–	–	1,321	3,113
Fort George	SC	SC	3,774	58.48%	2,398	37.16%	3,774	1,304	1,376	–	–	–	6,454
Grand Forks-Greenwood	CCF	CCF	877	42.57%	11	0.53%	866	877 (Note: Lois Haggen accepted the nomination after her husband Rupert Haggen chose to retire because of health problems.)	317	–	–	–	2,060
Kamloops	SC	SC	4,948	61.02%	2,931	36.15%	4,948	1,144	2,017	–	–	–	8,109
Kaslo-Slocan	CCF	CCF	1,512	54.31%	537	19.29%	975	1,512	297	–	–	–	2,784
Lillooet	Lib	SC	2,055	52.41%	1,096	27.95%	2,055	907	959	–	–	–	3,921
Mackenzie	CCF	CCF	4,502	48.41%	1,256	13.50%	3,246	4,502	1,362	189	–	–	9,299
Nanaimo and the Islands	PC	SC	3,827	45.52%	864	12.60%	3,827	2,963	2,142	–	–	69	9,001
Nelson-Creston	SC	SC	4,190	51.02%	1,859	22.64%	4,190	2,331	1,622	–	70	–	8,213
New Westminster	CCF	CCF	4,469	38.83%	293	2.55%	4,176	4,469	2,220	–	–	645	11,510
North Okanagan	SC	SC	4,583	54.74%	2,311	27.60%	4,583	1,429	2,272	–	88	–	8,372
North Peace River	New	SC	1,087	53.23%	664	32.52%	1,087	359	423	–	–	173 (Note: Campaigned as People's Party of BC.)	2,042
Oak Bay	Lib	Lib	3,940	49.38%	1,249	15.65%	2,691	429	3,940	919	–	–	7,979
Omineca	SC	SC	1,685	54.06%	838	26.89%	1,685	585	847	–	–	–	3,117
Prince Rupert	Lib	SC	2,151	42.39%	487	9.60%	2,151	1,259	1,664	–	–	–	5,074
Revelstoke	CCF	SC	1,339	49.81%	354	13.17%	1,339	985	364	–	–	–	2,688
Rossland-Trail	SC	SC	5,097	50.23%	2,258	22.25%	5,097	2,839	1,960	252	–	–	10,148
Saanich	SC	SC	6,542	39.45%	1,103	6.65%	6,542	5,439	3,344	1,257	–	–	16,582
Salmon Arm	SC	SC	2,131	51.24%	677	16.28%	2,131	1,454	339	487	–	–	4,159
Similkameen	SC	SC	5,189	53.94%	2,989	31.07%	5,189	2,200	1,744	487	–	–	9,620
Skeena	CCF	SC	1,886	37.01%	63	1.24%	1,886	1,823	1,387	–	–	–	5,096
South Okanagan	SC	SC	7,694	69.70%	6,031	54.63%	7,694	1,663	1,230	451	–	–	11,038
South Peace River	New	SC	1,787	50.80%	512	14.56%	1,787	1,275	456	–	–	–	3,518
Yale	SC	SC	1,315	47.34%	612	22.03%	1,315	599	703	161	–	–	2,778

= open seat
= turnout is above provincial average
= winning candidate was in previous Legislature
= incumbent had switched allegiance
= previously incumbent in another riding
= not incumbent; was previously elected to the Legislature
= incumbency arose from byelection gain
= other incumbents renominated
= campaigned as Independent SC
= multiple candidates

Results by riding - 1956 British Columbia general election (multiple-member districts)
Riding		Winning party		Votes							Voters who voted
Name	MLAs	1953	1956	SC	CCF	Lib	PC	LPP	Ind	Total	Voters who voted
Burnaby	2	1	2	12,103	**15,304**	3,972	513	–	–	60,540	31,243
Burnaby	2	1	2	11,583	12,692	3,895	478	–	–	60,540	31,243
Delta	2	1	2	**18,848**	11,202	5,149	–	355	–	69,066	35,578
Delta	2	1	2	17,762	10,798	4,680	–	272	–	69,066	35,578
North Vancouver	2	1	2	11,974	4,718	8,425	5,121	211	**902** (Note: George Henry Tomlinson Jr., a Socred MLA in the previous Legislature.)	53,719	28,602
North Vancouver	2	1	2	11,298	4,266	6,386	–	191	227	53,719	28,602
Vancouver-Burrard	2	2	2	**12,824**	7,826	4,972	1,095	260	203	52,369	27,798
Vancouver-Burrard	2	2	2	**12,180**	7,322	4,424	1,006	257	–	52,369	27,798
Vancouver Centre	2	2	2	**9,112**	4,561	3,996	969	485	–	36,302	19,128
Vancouver Centre	2	2	2	**8,614**	4,393	3,727	–	445	–	36,302	19,128
Vancouver East	2	2	1 1	18,640	**19,774**	4,229	720	–	–	84,422	44,795
Vancouver East	2	2	1 1	17,821	18,541	4,156	541	–	–	84,422	44,795
Vancouver-Point Grey	3	2 1	3	**25,615**	11,365	**17,801**	3,324	318	959	155,953	53,152
Vancouver-Point Grey	3	2 1	3	**23,696**	8,435	15,599	2,878	–	–	155,953	53,152
Vancouver-Point Grey	3	2 1	3	23,238	7,979	12,924	1,822	–	–	155,953	53,152
Victoria City	3	3	2 1	**9,199**	3,432	**8,408** (Note: George Frederick Thompson Gregory (Liberal)won the seat in a 1953 byelection, taking it from the Socreds.)	1,476	162	–	60,519	21,474
Victoria City	3	3	2 1	8,620	3,417	7,241	–	143	–	60,519	21,474
Victoria City	3	3	2 1	7,827	3,265	7,205	–	124	–	60,519	21,474

Bold indicates incumbent in last Legislature.

= winning candidate

== See also ==
- List of British Columbia political parties
