= 24th Parliament of British Columbia =

The 24th Legislative Assembly of British Columbia sat from September 1953 to 1956. The members were elected in the British Columbia general election held in June 1953. The Social Credit Party led by W. A. C. Bennett formed the government. The Co-operative Commonwealth Federation led by Arnold Webster formed the official opposition.

Thomas James Irwin served as speaker for the assembly.

== Members of the 24th Parliament ==
The following members were elected to the assembly in 1953:

Member	Electoral district	Party	First elected / previously elected	No.# of term(s)
Stanley John Squire	Alberni	CCF	1952	2nd term
Frank Arthur Calder	Atlin	CCF	1949	3rd term
Ernest Edward Winch	Burnaby	CCF	1933	7th term
William Ralph Talbot Chetwynd	Cariboo	Social Credit	1952	2nd term
William Kenneth Kiernan	Chilliwack	Social Credit	1952	2nd term
Richard Orr Newton	Columbia	Social Credit	1952, 1953	2nd term*
William Campbell Moore	Comox	CCF	1952	2nd term
Robert Martin Strachan	Cowichan-Newcastle	CCF	1952	2nd term
Leo Thomas Nimsick	Cranbrook	CCF	1949	3rd term
Thomas Irwin	Delta	Social Credit	1952	2nd term
Lyle Wicks	Dewdney	Social Credit	1952	2nd term
Herbert Joseph Bruch	Esquimalt	Social Credit	1953	1st term
Thomas Aubert Uphill	Fernie	Labour	1920	10th term
Ray Gillis Williston	Fort George	Social Credit	1953	1st term
Rupert Williams Haggen	Grand Forks-Greenwood	CCF	1949	3rd term
Philip Arthur Gaglardi	Kamloops	Social Credit	1952	2nd term
Randolph Harding	Kaslo-Slocan	CCF	1945	4th term
James Gordon Gibson	Lillooet	Liberal	1953	1st term
Donald Frederick Robinson (1955)	Lillooet	Social Credit	1955	1st term
Anthony John Gargrave	Mackenzie	CCF	1952	2nd term
Lorenzo (Larry) Giovando	Nanaimo and the Islands	Progressive Conservative	1952	2nd term
Lorenzo (Larry) Giovando	Nanaimo and the Islands	Independent	1952	2nd term
Wesley Drewett Black	Nelson-Creston	Social Credit	1952	2nd term
John McRae (Rae) Eddie	New Westminster	CCF	1952	2nd term
Lorne Shantz	North Okanagan	Social Credit	1952	2nd term
George Henry Tomlinson, Jr.	North Vancouver	Social Credit	1953	1st term
Philip Archibald Gibbs	Oak Bay	Liberal	1952	2nd term
Cyril Morley Shelford	Omineca	Social Credit	1952	2nd term
Charles William Parker	Peace River	Social Credit	1952	2nd term
Arthur Bruce Brown	Prince Rupert	Liberal	1953	1st term
Vincent Segur	Revelstoke	CCF	1943, 1952	3rd term*
Robert Edward Sommers	Rossland-Trail	Social Credit	1952	2nd term
John Douglas Tidball Tisdalle	Saanich	Social Credit	1953	1st term
James Allan Reid	Salmon Arm	Social Credit	1952	2nd term
Francis Xavier Richter	Similkameen	Social Credit	1953	1st term
Frank Howard	Skeena	CCF	1953	1st term
William Andrew Cecil Bennett	South Okanagan	Social Credit	1941, (Note: First elected as a Conservative) 1949	5th term*
Eric Charles Fitzgerald Martin	Vancouver-Burrard	Social Credit	1952	2nd term
Bert Price	Vancouver-Burrard	Social Credit	1952	2nd term
Alexander Small Matthew	Vancouver Centre	Social Credit	1953	1st term
George Churchill Moxham	Vancouver Centre	Social Credit	1953	1st term
Leslie Raymond Peterson (1956)	Vancouver Centre	Social Credit	1956	1st term
Arthur James Turner	Vancouver East	CCF	1941	5th term
Arnold Alexander Webster	Vancouver East	CCF	1953	1st term
Thomas Audley Bate	Vancouver-Point Grey	Social Credit	1953	1st term
Robert William Bonner	Vancouver-Point Grey	Social Credit	1952	2nd term
Arthur Laing	Vancouver-Point Grey	Liberal	1953	1st term
Lydia Augusta Arsens	Victoria City	Social Credit	1953	1st term
William Neelands Chant	Victoria City	Social Credit	1953	1st term
Walter Percival Wright	Victoria City	Social Credit	1953	1st term
George Frederick Thompson Gregory (1953)	Victoria City	Liberal	1953	1st term
Irvine Finlay Corbett	Yale	Social Credit	1952	2nd term

== Party standings ==
Affiliation	Members
Social Credit	28
Co-operative Commonwealth	14
Liberal	4
Progressive Conservative	1
Labour	1
Total	48
Government Majority	8

== By-elections ==
By-elections were held to replace members for various reasons:

Electoral district	Member elected	Party	Election date	Reason
Victoria City	George Frederick Thompson Gregory	Liberal	November 24, 1953	W.P. Wright resigned to provide seat for E.M. Gunderson
Lillooet	Donald Frederick Robinson	Social Credit	September 12, 1955	J.G. Gibson resigned to seek electoral vindication for allegations of fraud and patronage that he made in the legislature
Vancouver Centre	Leslie Raymond Peterson	Social Credit	January 9, 1956	death of G.C. Moxham November 10, 1955

== Other changes ==
- Lorenzo Giovando leaves the Progressive Conservatives to become an Independent in July 1954.
