= 1960 British Columbia general election =

Canadian provincial election

- September 12, 1960

52 seats of the Legislative Assembly of British Columbia 27 seats were needed for a majority
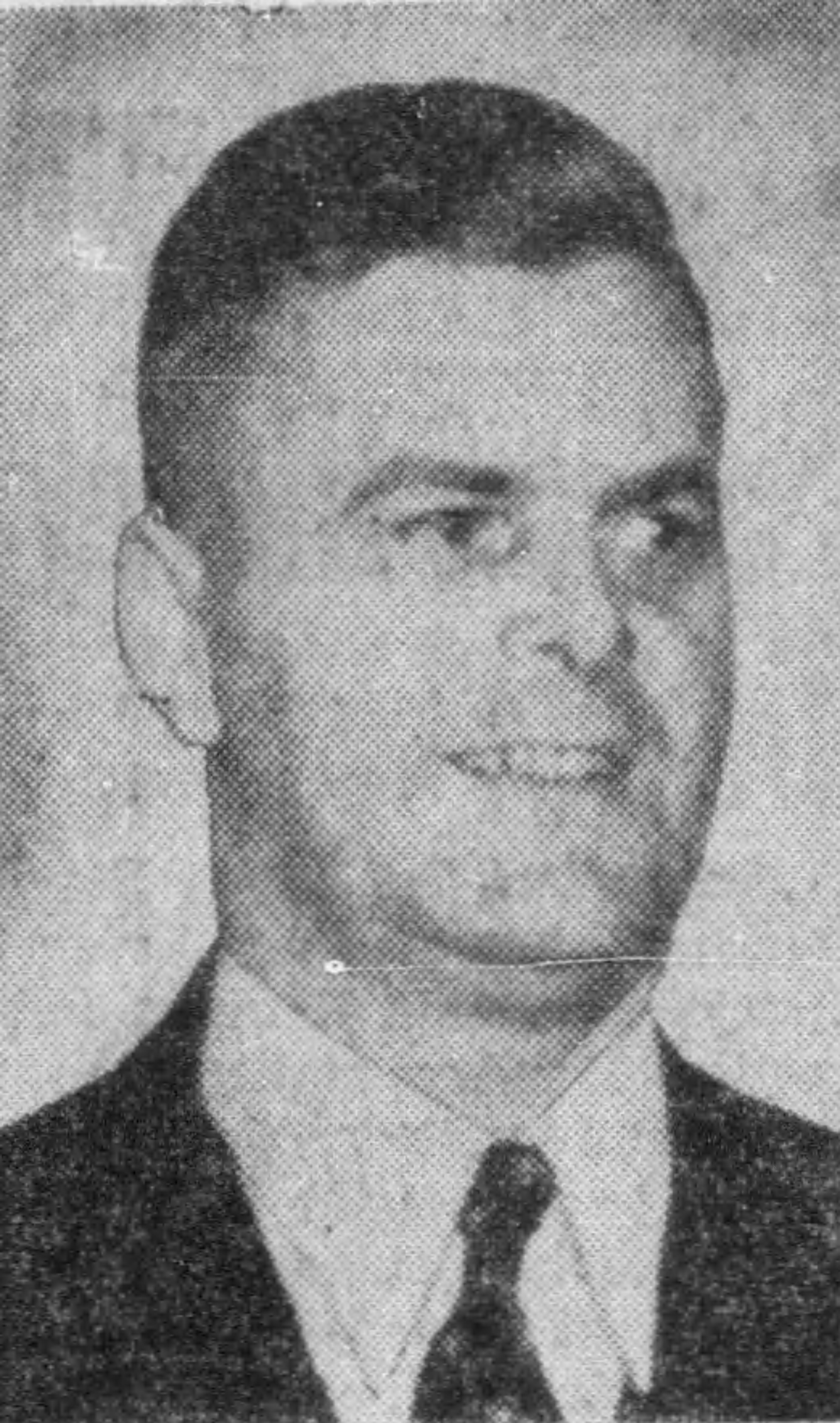

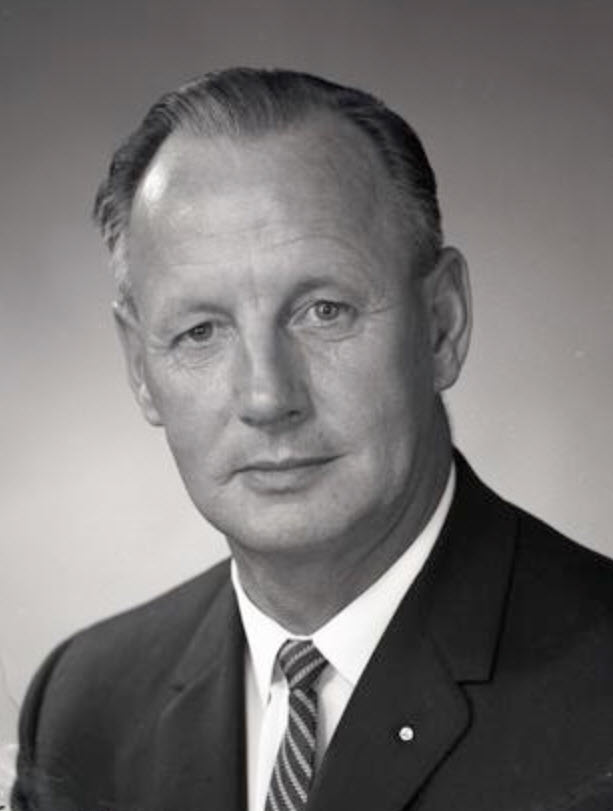
	First party	Second party
Leader	W. A. C. Bennett	Robert Strachan
Party	Social Credit	Co-operative Commonwealth
Leader since	1952	1956
Leader's seat	South Okanagan	Cowichan-Newcastle
Last election	39 seats, 45.84%	10 seats, 28.32%
Seats won	32	16
Seat change	▼7	▲6
Popular vote	386,886	326,094
Percentage	38.83%	32.73%
Swing	▼7.01pp	▲4.41pp
	Third party	Fourth party
	BCLP	PC
Leader	Ray Perrault	Deane Finlayson
Party	Liberal	Progressive Conservative
Leader since	1959	1952
Leader's seat	North Vancouver	Ran in North Vancouver (lost)
Last election	2 seats, 21.77%	0 seats, 3.11%
Seats won	4	0
Seat change	▲2	0
Popular vote	208,249	66,943
Percentage	20.90%	6.72%
Swing	▼0.87pp	▲3.61pp
Premier before election
W. A. C. Bennett
Social Credit
Premier after election
W. A. C. Bennett
Social Credit

The 1960 British Columbia general election was the 26th general election in the province of British Columbia, Canada. It was held to elect members of the Legislative Assembly of British Columbia. The election was called on August 3, 1960, and held on September 12, 1960. The new legislature met for the first time on January 26, 1961.

The conservative Social Credit of Premier W.A.C. Bennett was re-elected with a majority in the legislature to a fourth term in government despite losing seven percentage points of the popular vote and seven of its seats in the legislature.

The opposition Co-operative Commonwealth Federation increased both its share of the popular vote and its number of seats.

The British Columbia Liberal Party lost a small part of its popular vote, but managed to double its caucus from two to four members.

The Progressive Conservative Party doubled its share of the popular vote to almost 7%, but won no seats in the legislature.

== Results ==
Elections to the 26th Legislative Assembly of British Columbia (1960)
Political party	Party leader	MLAs				Votes			
Political party	Party leader	Candidates	1956	1960	±	#	±	%	± (pp)
Social Credit	W.A.C. Bennett	52	39	32	7▼	386,886	12,175▲	38.83	7.01▼
Co-operative Commonwealth	Bob Strachan	52	10	16	6▲	326,094	94,583▲	32.73	4.41▲
Liberal	Ray Perrault	50	2	4	2▲	208,249	30,327▲	20.90	0.87▼
Progressive Conservative	Deane Finlayson	52	–	–	–	66,943	41,570▲	6.72	3.61▲
Labour	Tom Uphill	–	1	–	1▼	Retired			
Communist (Note: Previously known as Labor-Progressive)		19	–	–	–	5,675	2,294▲	0.57	0.16▲
Independent		5	–	–	–	2,557	621▼	0.25	0.14▼
Total		230	52	52		996,404		100.00%	
Rejected ballots						9,862	3,220▲		
Actual voters who voted						628,031	118,622▲	71.84%	6.41▲
Registered voters						874,267	95,680▲		

Seats and popular vote by party
Party	Seats	Votes	Change (pp)
█ Social Credit	32 / 52	38.83%	-7.01
█ Co-operative Commonwealth	16 / 52	32.73%	4.41
█ Liberal	4 / 52	20.90%	-0.87
█ Progressive Conservative	0 / 52	6.72%	3.61
█ Other	0 / 52	0.82%	-0.14

== MLAs elected ==
Single-member districts

Alberni: Stanley John Squire
Atlin: Frank Calder
Cariboo: William C. Speare
Chilliwack: William Kenneth Kiernan
Columbia: Richard Orr Newton
Comox: Daniel Campbell
Cowichan-Newcastle: Robert Strachan
Cranbrook: Leo Nimsick
Dewdney: Dave Barrett
Esquimalt: Herbert Joseph Bruch
Fernie: Harry McKay
Fort George: Ray Williston
Grand Forks-Greenwood: Lois Haggen
Kamloops: Phil Gaglardi
Kaslo-Slocan: Randolph Harding
Lillooet: Don Robinson
Mackenzie: Anthony Gargrave
Nanaimo and the Islands: Earle Cathers Westwood
Nelson-Creston: Wesley Drewett Black
New Westminster: Rae Eddie
North Okanagan: Lorne Shantz
North Peace River: Jacob Francis Huhn
Oak Bay: Alan MacFarlane
Omineca: Cyril Morley Shelford
Prince Rupert: William Harvey Murray
Revelstoke: George Hobbs
Rossland-Trail: Donald Leslie Brothers
Saanich: John Douglas Tisdalle
Salmon Arm: Willis Franklin Jefcoat
Similkameen: Frank Richter, Jr.
Skeena: Dudley George Little
South Okanagan: W. A. C. Bennett
South Peace River: Stanley Carnell
Yale: Irvine Finlay Corbett

Multi-member districts

Burnaby: Cedric Cox
Burnaby: Gordon Dowding
Delta: Camille Mather
Delta: James Rhodes
North Vancouver: Gordon Gibson, Sr.
North Vancouver: Ray Perrault
Vancouver-Burrard: Eric Charles Fitzgerald Martin
Vancouver-Burrard: Bert Price
Vancouver Centre: Alexander Small Matthew
Vancouver Centre: Leslie Peterson
Vancouver East: Alexander Macdonald
Vancouver East: Arthur James Turner
Vancouver-Point Grey: Thomas Audley Bate
Vancouver-Point Grey: Robert Bonner
Vancouver-Point Grey: Buda Brown
Victoria City: William Chant
Victoria City: Waldo McTavish Skillings
Victoria City: John Donald Smith

=== Synopsis of results ===
Results by riding - 1960 British Columbia general election (single-member districts)
Riding	Winning party						Votes						
Name	1956	Party	Votes	Share	Margin #	Margin %	SC	CCF	Lib	PC	Comm	Ind	Total
Alberni	CCF	CCF	4,093	45.05%	1,127	12.40%	2,966	4,093	1,305	514	207	–	9,085
Atlin	SC	CCF	444	53.30%	177	21.25%	267	444	–	122	–	–	833
Cariboo	SC	SC	3,091	40.90%	1,018	13.47%	3,091	1,842	2,073	552	–	–	7,558
Chilliwack	SC	SC	10,051	54.30%	5,928	32.03%	10,051	4,123	3,163	1,173	–	–	18,510
Columbia	SC	SC	1,115	42.35%	340	12.92%	1,115	775	593	150	–	–	2,633
Comox	SC	SC	6,100	38.63%	28	0.18%	6,100	6,072	2,759	653	207	–	15,791
Cowichan-Newcastle	CCF	CCF	6,261	58.68%	3,228	30.25%	3,033	6,261	–	1,206	170	–	10,670
Cranbrook	CCF	CCF	2,786	44.18%	1,086	17.22%	1,700	2,786	1,475	345	–	–	6,306
Dewdney	SC	CCF	12,637	43.73%	1,924	6.66%	10,713	12,637	4,512	803	233	–	28,898
Esquimalt	SC	SC	4,429	40.38%	1,046	9.54%	4,429	3,383	2,165	991	–	–	10,968
Fernie	Lab	Lib	1,126	36.23%	199	6.40%	927	864	1,126	191	–	–	3,108
Fort George	SC	SC	5,066	55.28%	2,730	29.79%	5,066	2,336	1,416	346	–	–	9,164
Grand Forks-Greenwood	CCF	CCF	1,115	42.35%	363	13.79%	752	1,115	564	202	–	–	2,633
Kamloops	SC	SC	4,777	45.86%	1,949	18.71%	4,777	2,828	1,437	1,374	–	–	10,416
Kaslo-Slocan	CCF	CCF	1,298	50.35%	565	21.92%	733	1,298	303	244	–	–	2,578
Lillooet	SC	SC	1,695	39.56%	364	8.50%	1,695	1,331	923	336	–	–	4,285
Mackenzie	CCF	CCF	4,952	46.44%	1,785	16.74%	3,167	4,952	2,058	487	–	–	10,664
Nanaimo and the Islands	SC	SC	4,599	42.34%	51	0.47%	4,599	4,548	1,036	607	72	–	10,862
Nelson-Creston	SC	SC	4,501	49.37%	1,837	20.15%	4,501	2,664	1,222	730	–	–	9,117
New Westminster	CCF	CCF	6,496	41.25%	1,455	9.24%	5,041	6,496	2,519	1,691	–	–	15,747
North Okanagan	SC	SC	4,553	43.01%	1,525	14.41%	4,553	3,028	1,817	1,098	91	–	10,587
North Peace River	SC	SC	1,651	46.21%	693	19.40%	1,651	769	958	114	–	81	3,573
Oak Bay	Lib	Lib	4,558	44.46%	778	7.59%	3,780	701	4,558	1,212	–	–	10,251
Omineca	SC	SC	1,633	45.88%	514	14.44%	1,633	1,119	529	278	–	–	3,559
Prince Rupert	SC	SC	2,367	40.87%	228	3.94%	2,367	2,139	1,087	199	–	–	5,792
Revelstoke	SC	CCF	1,417	44.12%	472	14.70%	945	1,417	585	265	–	–	3,212
Rossland-Trail	SC	SC	5,562	51.12%	3,026	27.81%	5,562	2,536	2,034	608	141	–	10,881
Saanich	SC	SC	10,165	44.23%	3,653	15.90%	10,165	6,512	4,451	1,782	73	–	22,983
Salmon Arm	SC	SC	1,979	41.75%	312	6.58%	1,979	1,667	481	613	–	–	4,740
Similkameen	SC	SC	4,797	46.84%	1,646	16.07%	4,797	3,151	1,454	840	–	–	10,242
Skeena	SC	SC	2,379	41.19%	242	4.19%	2,379	2,137	848	411	–	–	5,775
South Okanagan	SC	SC	8,058	59.89%	5,156	38.32%	8,058	2,902	1,238	1,256	–	–	13,454
South Peace River	SC	SC	3,133	59.39%	1,794	34.01%	3,133	1,339	303	500	–	–	5,275
Yale	SC	SC	1,103	31.24%	29	1.82%	1,103	1,074	964	390	–	–	3,531

= open seat
= turnout is above provincial average
= winning candidate was in previous Legislature
= incumbent had switched allegiance
= previously incumbent in another riding
= not incumbent; was previously elected to the Legislature
= incumbency arose from byelection gain
= other incumbents renominated
= previously an MP in the House of Commons of Canada
= multiple candidates

Results by riding - 1956 British Columbia general election (multiple-member districts)
Riding		Winning party		Votes							Voters who voted
Name	MLAs	1956	1960	SC	CCF	Lib	PC	Comm	Ind	Total	Voters who voted
Burnaby	2	2	2	13,469	17,659	7,601	1,075	409	–	79,309	41,669
Burnaby	2	2	2	13,394	17,522	7,111	1,069	–	–	79,309	41,669
Delta	2	2	2	21,011	21,839	8,529	2,280	505	2,010 (Note: Gordon Lionel Gibson was elected as a Socred MLA in a 1957 byelection.)	106,328	55,073
Delta	2	2	2	17,291	21,559	8,517	2,159	408	220	106,328	55,073
North Vancouver	2	2	2	12,804	6,746	14,408	3,260 (Note: Deane Finlayson, PC party leader)	242	–	72,331	37,901
North Vancouver	2	2	2	12,276	6,720	13,287 (Note: Gordon Gibson, Sr. had previously been MLA for Lillooet from 1953 to 1955.)	2,397	191	–	72,331	37,901
Vancouver-Burrard	2	2	2	10,642	9,505	5,744	2,611	339	87	56,382	29,534
Vancouver-Burrard	2	2	2	10,231	9,333	5,715	1,904	271	–	56,382	29,534
Vancouver Centre	2	2	2	8,516	6,530	3,726	1,421	420	–	40,733	21,312
Vancouver Centre	2	2	2	8,227	6,378	3,724	1,411	380	–	40,733	21,312
Vancouver East	2	1 1	2	16,622	25,610	5,906	1,080	718	159	99,479	51,781
Vancouver East	2	1 1	2	16,379	25,580	5,828	999	598	–	99,479	51,781
Vancouver-Point Grey	3	3	3	24,273 (Note: Robert Bonner was previously an MLA for the district.)	12,702	17,438	6,774	–	–	172,832	59,871
Vancouver-Point Grey	3	3	3	23,950	12,158	15,107	6,453	–	–	172,832	59,871
Vancouver-Point Grey	3	3	3	23,583	11,538	14,827	4,029	–	–	172,832	59,871
Victoria City	3	2 1	3	9,864	4,598	7,278	2,236	–	–	65,329	22,387
Victoria City	3	2 1	3	8,855	4,516	6,083	1,959	–	–	65,329	22,387
Victoria City	3	2 1	3	8,671	4,262	5,464	1,543	–	–	65,329	22,387

= winning candidate

== See also ==
- List of British Columbia political parties
