= Swailes =

Swailes is a surname. Notable people with the surname include:

- Chris Swailes (born 1970), English football player
- Danny Swailes (born 1979), English football player
- Donovan Swailes (1892–1984), Canadian politician and musician
- Robert Swailes (1896–1968), Canadian politician
