= Donald Lewis =

Donald Lewis may refer to:

- Donald John Lewis (1926–2015), American mathematician
- Donald Emerson Lewis (1930–1991), Canadian politician
- Donald Swain Lewis (1886–1916), British Army and Royal Flying Corps/Royal Air Force officer
