= Alexander McDonald Paterson =

Canadian politician

Member of the Legislative Assembly of British Columbia
- In office 1921–1928
- Preceded by: John Oliver
- Succeeded by: John Walter Berry
- Constituency: Delta

Personal details
- Born: October 12, 1871 Middlesex County, Ontario, Canada
- Died: March 30, 1953 (aged 81) Vancouver, British Columbia, Canada
- Party: British Columbia Liberal Party
- Spouse: Lola Vea Bowers
- Occupation: farmer

Alexander McDonald Paterson (October 12, 1871 – March 30, 1953) was a Canadian politician. After being an unsuccessful candidate in the 1916 provincial election, he served in the Legislative Assembly of British Columbia from 1921 to 1928 from the electoral district of Delta, a member of the Liberal party. He was unsuccessful in his bid for a third term in the Legislature in both the 1928 and 1933 provincial elections. He also served as the Reeve of Delta for 28 years.
