= Frank MacKenzie (politician) =

Canadian politician (1873–1932)

Frank J. MacKenzie
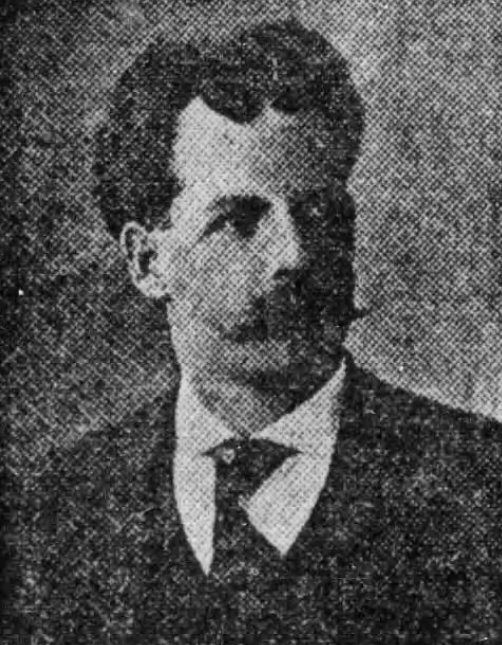

Member of the Legislative Assembly of British Columbia
- In office 1909–1920
- Preceded by: John Oliver
- Succeeded by: John Oliver
- Constituency: Delta

Personal details
- Born: Francis James Anderson MacKenzie; April 14, 1873 Kincardine, Ontario
- Died: July 6, 1932 (aged 59) White Rock, British Columbia
- Party: British Columbia Conservative Party
- Spouse: Esther Edge
- Children: 2
- Occupation: druggist

Francis James Anderson MacKenzie (April 14, 1873 – July 6, 1932) was a Canadian politician. After being an unsuccessful candidate in the 1907 provincial election, he served in the Legislative Assembly of British Columbia from 1909 to 1920 from the electoral district of Delta, a member of the Conservative party. He was defeated when he sought re-election in the 1920 provincial election and again in a 1921 provincial by-election.
