= Deane Finlayson =

Canadian politician

Douglas Deane Finlayson (August 14, 1919 – May 17, 2005) was a British Columbia politician and land developer.

Though he did not run for a seat in the 1952 provincial election, he became leader of the Progressive Conservative Party of British Columbia following the resignation of Herbert Anscomb and led the party through the 1953, 1956, and 1960 general elections but was unable to prevent the Tories from being wiped out in the face of the right of centre Social Credit government led by former Tory W. A. C. Bennett or win his own seat (he ran unsuccessfully in the 1953, 1956, and 1960 provincial elections plus in a 1953 provincial byelection). He had a reputation for honest speech and was given the title of Honorary Chief with the name "Chief Straight Tongue" by the Shushwap First Nations.

Finlayson built the Woodgrove Centre in Nanaimo and the Morningside subdivision in Hammond Bay.
