= Gordon Lionel Gibson =

Canadian politician

MLA for Delta
- In office 1957–1960
- Preceded by: Thomas Irwin
- Succeeded by: Camille Mather; James Henry Rhodes

Personal details
- Born: March 7, 1913 Princeton, British Columbia
- Died: February 27, 1998 (aged 84) Abbotsford, British Columbia
- Party: Social Credit
- Spouse: Edna Beatrice Cantelo (m. 1947)
- Children: 4
- Occupation: chiropractor

Gordon Lionel Gibson (March 7, 1913 – February 17, 1998) was a Canadian politician. He served in the Legislative Assembly of British Columbia from 1957 to 1960 from the electoral district of Delta, initially as a member of the Social Credit Party and then as an independent.
