= Delta (provincial electoral district) =

Defunct provincial electoral district in British Columbia, Canada

Delta was the name of a provincial electoral district in the Canadian province of British Columbia based on the municipality of Delta at the mouth of the Fraser River between the city of Vancouver and the Canada–United States border. It made its first appearance on the hustings in the election of 1903 and its last in the election of 1986, after which it was succeeded by Delta North and Delta South, which are the current ridings in the area.

== Members of the Legislative Assembly ==
=== Single-member district ===
| Assembly | Years | Member | Party |
|---|---|---|---|
Riding created from Westminster-Delta
| 10th | 1903–1907 | John Oliver | Liberal |
| 11th | 1907–1909 | John Oliver | Liberal |
| 12th | 1909–1912 | Francis James Anderson MacKenzie | Conservative |
| 13th | 1912–1916 | Francis James Anderson MacKenzie | Conservative |
| 14th | 1916–1920 | Francis James Anderson MacKenzie | Conservative |
| 15th | 1920–1924 | John Oliver | Liberal |
| 16th | 1924–1928 | Alexander McDonald Paterson | Liberal |
| 17th | 1928–1933 | John Walter Berry | Conservative |
| 18th | 1933–1937 | Robert Swailes | CCF |
| 19th | 1937–1941 | Leonard Alec Shepherd | CCF |
| 20th | 1941–1945 | Leonard Alec Shepherd | CCF |
| 21st | 1945–1949 | Alexander Campbell Hope | Coalition (PC) |
| 22nd | 1949–1952 | Alexander Campbell Hope | Coalition (PC) |
| 22nd | 1952 | Alexander Campbell Hope | PC |
| 23rd | 1952–1953 | Thomas Irwin | Social Credit |
| 24th | 1953–1956 | Thomas Irwin | Social Credit |
Became a dual-member district between 1956–1966
| 28th | 1966–1969 | Robert Wenman | Social Credit |
| 29th | 1969–1972 | Robert Wenman | Social Credit |
| 30th | 1972–1975 | Carl Liden | NDP |
| 31st | 1975–1979 | Kenneth Walter Davidson | Social Credit |
| 32nd | 1979–1983 | Kenneth Walter Davidson | Social Credit |
| 33rd | 1983–1986 | Kenneth Walter Davidson | Social Credit |

=== Dual-member district ===
| Assembly | Years | Seat 1 | | Seat 2 | |
| Assembly | Years | Member | Party | Member | Party |
|---|---|---|---|---|---|
| 25th | 1956–1957 | Thomas Irwin | Social Credit | Nehemiah George Massey | Social Credit |
| 25th | 1957–1960 | Gordon Lionel Gibson | Social Credit | Nehemiah George Massey | Social Credit |
| 26th | 1960–1961 | Camille Mather | CCF | James Henry Rhodes | CCF |
| 26th | 1961–1963 | Camille Mather | NDP | James Henry Rhodes | NDP |
| 27th | 1963–1966 | Hunter Vogel | Social Credit | Ernest LeCours | Social Credit |
Became a single-member district again between 1966–1986
| 34th | 1986–1991 | John Savage | Social Credit | Walter Davidson | Social Credit |
Riding dissolved into Delta North and Delta South.

== Electoral history ==
1903 British Columbia general election
| Party | Candidate | Votes | % |
|---|---|---|---|
| Liberal | John Oliver | 447 | 59.13% |
| Conservative | William Henry Ladner | 309 | 40.87% |
| Total valid votes | | 756 | 100.00% |

1907 British Columbia general election
| Party | Candidate | Votes | % |
|---|---|---|---|
| Liberal | John Oliver | 430 | 62.23% |
| Conservative | Francis James Anderson MacKenzie | 261 | 37.77% |
| Total valid votes | | 691 | 100.00% |

1909 British Columbia general election
| Party | Candidate | Votes | % |
|---|---|---|---|
| Conservative | Francis James Anderson MacKenzie | 765 | 58.13% |
| Liberal | John Oliver | 551 | 41.87% |
| Total valid votes | | 1,316 | 100.00% |

1912 British Columbia general election
| Party | Candidate | Votes | % |
|---|---|---|---|
| Conservative | Francis James Anderson MacKenzie | 748 | 70.83% |
| Liberal | John Oliver | 308 | 29.17% |
| Total valid votes | | 1,056 | 100.00% |

1916 British Columbia general election
| Party | Candidate | Votes | % |
|---|---|---|---|
| Conservative | Francis James Anderson MacKenzie | 964 | 51.55% |
| Liberal | Alexander McDonald Paterson | 906 | 48.45% |
| Total valid votes | | 1,870 | 100.00% |

1920 British Columbia general election
| Party | Candidate | Votes | % |
|---|---|---|---|
| Liberal | John Oliver | 1,334 | 37.50% |
| Soldier–Farmer | Richmond Archie Payne | 1,107 | 31.12% |
| Conservative | Francis James Anderson MacKenzie | 964 | 21.55% |
| Total valid votes | | 3,557 | 100.00% |

1924 British Columbia general election
| Party | Candidate | Votes | % |
|---|---|---|---|
| Liberal | Alexander McDonald Paterson | 1,677 | 46.13% |
| Conservative | Archibald Woodbury McLelan | 1,253 | 34.47% |
| Provincial | Saul A. Bonnell | 633 | 17.42% |
| Independent Liberal | Hugh Williams | 72 | 1.98% |
| Total valid votes | | 3,635 | 100.00% |

1928 British Columbia general election
| Party | Candidate | Votes | % |
|---|---|---|---|
| Conservative | John Walter Berry | 2,562 | 55.73% |
| Liberal | Alexander McDonald Paterson | 2,035 | 44.27% |
| Total valid votes | | 4,597 | 100.00% |
| Total rejected ballots | | 51 | |

1933 British Columbia general election
| Party | Candidate | Votes | % |
|---|---|---|---|
| Co-operative Commonwealth | Robert Swailes | 2,631 | 36.95% |
| Liberal | Alexander McDonald Paterson | 2,093 | 29.40% |
| Independent | Rudolph Martin Grauer | 1,735 | 24.37% |
| Independent Conservative | John Walter Berry | 447 | 6.28% |
| Independent Conservative | Christopher Thomas Lawrence | 165 | 2.32% |
| United Front (Workers and Farmers) | Robert Kitchener Almas | 49 | 0.69% |
| Total valid votes | | 7,120 | 100.00% |
| Total rejected ballots | | 64 | |

1937 British Columbia general election
| Party | Candidate | Votes | % |
|---|---|---|---|
| Co-operative Commonwealth | Leonard Alec Shepherd | 3,192 | 32.93% |
| Liberal | Arthur Laing | 3,102 | 32.01% |
| Conservative | Rudolph Martin Grauer | 2,815 | 29.04% |
| Social Constructive | Robert Swailes | 583 | 6.02% |
| Total valid votes | | 9,692 | 100.00% |
| Total rejected ballots | | 150 | |

1941 British Columbia general election
| Party | Candidate | Votes | % |
|---|---|---|---|
| Co-operative Commonwealth | Leonard Alec Shepherd | 5,153 | 42.29% |
| Liberal | Arthur Laing | 3,554 | 29.17% |
| Conservative | Alexander Campbell Hope | 3,478 | 28.54% |
| Total valid votes | | 12,185 | 100.00% |
| Total rejected ballots | | 225 | |

1945 British Columbia general election
| Party | Candidate | Votes | % |
|---|---|---|---|
| Coalition | Alexander Campbell Hope | 5,859 | 53.64% |
| Co-operative Commonwealth | Leonard Alec Shepherd | 5,063 | 46.36% |
| Total valid votes | | 10,922 | 100.00% |
| Total rejected ballots | | 138 | |

1949 British Columbia general election
| Party | Candidate | Votes | % |
|---|---|---|---|
| Coalition | Alexander Campbell Hope | 12,203 | 49.59% |
| Co-operative Commonwealth | Leonard Alec Shepherd | 11,110 | 45.15% |
| Social Credit | Lyle Wicks | 1,293 | 5.25% |
| Total valid votes | | 24,606 | 100.00% |
| Total rejected ballots | | 903 | |

1952 British Columbia general election
| Party | Candidate | Votes 1st count | % | Votes final count | % |
|---|---|---|---|---|---|
| Social Credit League | Thomas Irwin | 11,759 | 37.22 | 14,805 | 52.69 |
| Co-operative Commonwealth | Leonard Alec Shepherd | 10,853 | 34.35 | 13,295 | 47.31 |
| Progressive Conservative | Alexander Campbell Hope | 4,688 | 18.84 | | |
| Liberal | Donald Alexander Sutherland Lanskail | 4,293 | 13.59 | | |
| Total valid votes | | 31,593 | 100.00 | 28,100 | 100.00 |
| Total rejected ballots | | 2,172 | | | |
Note: Preferential ballot; first and final of three (3) counts only shown.

1953 British Columbia general election
| Party | Candidate | Votes 1st count | % | Votes final count | % |
|---|---|---|---|---|---|
| Social Credit | Thomas Irwin | 15,417 | 54.05 | 15,417 | 54.05 |
| Co-operative Commonwealth | Leonard Alec Shepherd | 11,095 | 35.80 | 13,108 | 45.95 |
| Liberal | Leslie Gilmore | 5,500 | 17.75 | | |
| Progressive Conservative | Robert William Pybus | 591 | 1.91 | | |
| Labor–Progressive | David Arnold Danielson | 390 | 1.26 | | |
| Christian Democratic | Cyril Anthony Brocking | 315 | 1.02 | | |
| People's | Edward Charles Mills | 20 | 0.06 | | |
| Total valid votes | | 30,990 | 100.00 | 28,525 | 100.00 |
| Total rejected ballots | | 1,786 | | | |
Note: Preferential ballot; first and final of three (3) counts only shown.

1956 British Columbia general election
| Party | Candidate | Votes | % | Elected |
|---|---|---|---|---|
| Social Credit | Thomas Irwin | 18,848 | 52.98 | ✓ |
| Social Credit | Nehemiah George Massey | 17,762 | 49.92 | ✓ |
| Co-operative Commonwealth | Walter H. Johnson | 11,202 | 31.49 | |
| Co-operative Commonwealth | James Henry Rhodes | 10,798 | 30.35 | |
| Liberal | Victor A. McPherson | 5,149 | 14.47 | |
| Liberal | William Pearce Wilson | 4,680 | 13.15 | |
| Labor–Progressive | Myrtle Evelyn Burnell | 355 | 1.00 | |
| Labor–Progressive | Frank Gaspar | 272 | 0.76 | |
| Total valid votes | | 35,578 | 100.00 | |
| Total rejected ballots | | 352 | | |

British Columbia provincial by-election, 1957
| Party | Candidate | Votes | % |
|---|---|---|---|
| Social Credit | Gordon Lionel Gibson | 9,989 | 39.41% |
| Co-operative Commonwealth | Leonard Alec Shepherd | 8,379 | 33.06% |
| Progressive Conservative | Craig Frazer | 5,388 | 21.26% |
| Liberal | William Wilson | 1,266 | 4.99% |
| Labor–Progressive | Peter Gidora | 217 | 0.86 |
| Independent | Peter Wolanski | 109 | 0.43 |
| Total valid votes | | 25,348 | 100.00% |

1960 British Columbia general election
| Party | Candidate | Votes | % | Elected |
|---|---|---|---|---|
| Co-operative Commonwealth | Camille Mather | 21,839 | 39.65 | ✓ |
| Co-operative Commonwealth | James Henry Rhodes | 21,559 | 39.14 | ✓ |
| Social Credit | Nehemiah George Massey | 21,011 | 38.15 | |
| Social Credit | Donald H. Riggan | 17,291 | 31.40 | |
| Liberal | Arthur R. Helps | 8,529 | 15.49 | |
| Liberal | C. Douglas Morris | 8,517 | 15.46 | |
| Progressive Conservative | George Francis Crowe | 2,280 | 4.14 | |
| Progressive Conservative | Dalton O. Jones | 2,159 | 3.92 | |
| Independent | Gordon Lionel Gibson | 2,010 | 3.65 | |
| Communist | Homer Stevens | 505 | 0.92 | |
| Communist | George Lakusta | 408 | 0.74 | |
| Independent | Norman Baker | 220 | 0.40 | |
| Total valid votes | | 55,073 | 100.00 | |
| Total rejected ballots | | 834 | | |

1963 British Columbia general election
| Party | Candidate | Votes | % | Elected |
|---|---|---|---|---|
| Social Credit | Hunter Bertram Vogel | 22,504 | 41.78 | ✓ |
| Social Credit | Ernest LeCours | 22,067 | 40.97 | ✓ |
| New Democratic | Camille Mather | 18,690 | 34.70 | |
| New Democratic | James Henry Rhodes | 17,661 | 32.79 | |
| Liberal | J.T. "Jock" Smith | 5,553 | 10.31 | |
| Liberal | Harry Lewis Huff | 5,342 | 9.92 | |
| Progressive Conservative | Theodore Kuhn | 4,461 | 8.28 | |
| Progressive Conservative | Thomas Horan | 4,049 | 7.52 | |
| Communist | Homer Stevens | 505 | 0.94 | |
| Total valid votes | | 53,860 | 100.00 | |
| Total rejected ballots | | 473 | | |

1966 British Columbia general election
| Party | Candidate | Votes | % |
|---|---|---|---|
| Social Credit | Robert Wenman | 7,768 | 46.46% |
| New Democratic | Thomas Jack Howard | 6,078 | 36.35% |
| Liberal | George Garrett | 1,954 | 11.69% |
| Progressive Conservative | Philip Govan | 921 | 5.51% |
| Total valid votes | | 16,721 | 100.00% |
| Total rejected ballots | | 153 | |

1969 British Columbia general election
| Party | Candidate | Votes | % |
|---|---|---|---|
| Social Credit | Robert Wenman | 14,145 | 51.35% |
| New Democratic | Carl Liden | 9,855 | 35.78% |
| Liberal | Doral Hemm | 3,545 | 12.87% |
| Total valid votes | | 27,545 | 100.00% |
| Total rejected ballots | | 295 | |

1972 British Columbia general election
| Party | Candidate | Votes | % |
|---|---|---|---|
| New Democratic | Carl Liden | 15,040 | 39.90% |
| Social Credit | Robert Wenman | 12,260 | 32.53% |
| Progressive Conservative | Marcia Ann Boyd | 6,660 | 17.67% |
| Liberal | Lorne L. Donnelly | 3,730 | 9.90% |
| Total valid votes | | 37,690 | 100.00% |
| Total rejected ballots | | 378 | |

1975 British Columbia general election
| Party | Candidate | Votes | % |
|---|---|---|---|
| Social Credit | Kenneth Walter Davidson | 25,892 | 53.32% |
| New Democratic | Carl Liden | 17,469 | 35.98% |
| Progressive Conservative | John O'Brien Bell | 2,857 | 5.88% |
| Liberal | Arthur Edward Bates | 2,236 | 4.60% |
| Communist | Michael Anthony Darnell | 105 | 0.22% |
| Total valid votes | | 48,559 | 100.00% |
| Total rejected ballots | | 592 | |

1979 British Columbia general election
| Party | Candidate | Votes | % |
|---|---|---|---|
| Social Credit | Kenneth Walter Davidson | 16,421 | 55.10% |
| New Democratic | Carl Liden | 11,429 | 38.35% |
| Progressive Conservative | Elsie Gwendolyn Burnett | 1,877 | 6.30% |
| Communist | John Michael Stevens | 73 | 0.25% |
| Total valid votes | | 29,800 | 100.00% |
| Total rejected ballots | | 228 | |

1983 British Columbia general election
| Party | Candidate | Votes | % |
|---|---|---|---|
| Social Credit | Kenneth Walter Davidson | 21,496 | 58.37% |
| New Democratic | Karl H. Moser | 13,300 | 36.12% |
| Progressive Conservative | David Peter Hoyt | 1,117 | 3.03% |
| Liberal | Ken Buhay | 464 | 1.26% |
| WCC | Michael Terence Coggan | 450 | 1.22% |
| Total valid votes | | 36,827 | 100.00% |
| Total rejected ballots | | 247 | |

1986 British Columbia general election
| Party | Candidate | Votes | % | Elected |
|---|---|---|---|---|
| Social Credit | John Lawrence Savage | 20,950 | 57.38 | ✓ |
| Social Credit | Kenneth Walter Davidson | 20,523 | 56.21 | ✓ |
| New Democratic | Karl H. Moser | 13,581 | 37.20 | |
| Co-operative Commonwealth | Sylvia K. Bishop | 11,984 | 32.82 | |
| Liberal | Samuel D. Stevens | 2,855 | 7.82 | |
| Progressive Conservative | Kenneth Douglas Smith | 1,804 | 4.94 | |
| Total valid votes | | 36,510 | 100.00 | |
| Total rejected ballots | | 722 | | |

The Delta riding was partitioned after the 1986 election into Delta North and Delta South.

== See also ==
- List of British Columbia provincial electoral districts
- Canadian provincial electoral districts
