= John Walter Berry =

Canadian politician (1868–1943)

Member of the Legislative Assembly of British Columbia
- In office 1928–1933
- Preceded by: Alexander McDonald Paterson
- Succeeded by: Robert Swailes
- Constituency: Delta

Personal details
- Born: December 18, 1868 Ontario
- Died: September 5, 1943 (aged 74) Langley, British Columbia
- Party: British Columbia Conservative Party
- Spouse: Lydia Bowman
- Occupation: farmer

John Walter Berry (December 18, 1868 – September 5, 1943) was a Canadian politician. He served in the Legislative Assembly of British Columbia from 1928 to 1933 from the electoral district of Delta, a member of the Conservative party. He was an unsuccessful candidate in the Delta constituency in both the 1900 provincial election (running as a Conservative) and in the 1933 provincial election (running as an Independent Conservative).
