= Robert Swailes =

Canadian politician

Member of the Legislative Assembly of British Columbia
- In office 1933–1937
- Preceded by: John Walter Berry
- Succeeded by: Leonard Alec Shepherd
- Constituency: Delta

Personal details
- Born: Robert Blatchford Swailes; February 26, 1896 Leeds, England
- Died: June 6, 1968 (aged 72) Vancouver, British Columbia
- Party: CCF
- Spouse: Sophie Strobel
- Occupation: farmer

Robert Blatchford Swailes (February 26, 1896 – June 6, 1968) was a politician in British Columbia. He represented Delta in the Legislative Assembly of British Columbia.

A farmer from the Aldergrove area, Swailes was elected as a CCF member in 1933. When Reverend Robert Connell was expelled from the CCF in 1936 and formed the Social Constructive Party, Swailes also left the CCF and joined the new party. Swailes was defeated in 1937 and retired from politics.

He died in Vancouver at the age of 72 in 1968.

His brother Donovan served as a member of the Manitoba legislature.
