= Thomas Irwin (Canadian politician) =

Canadian politician (1889–1962)

Member of the Legislative Assembly of British Columbia for Delta
- In office June 1952 – June 1957
- Preceded by: Alexander Campbell Hope
- Succeeded by: Gordon Lionel Gibson

Member of Parliament for Burnaby—Richmond
- In office June 1957 – March 1958
- Preceded by: Tom Goode
- Succeeded by: John Drysdale

Personal details
- Born: Thomas James Irwin; 21 June 1889 Dumbarton, Scotland
- Died: 15 May 1962 (aged 72)
- Party: Social Credit
- Profession: farmer

Thomas James Irwin (21 June 1889 – 15 May 1962) was a Canadian politician serving in the Legislative Assembly of British Columbia and the House of Commons of Canada.

Irwin was born in Dumbarton, Scotland and became a farmer by trade. He was elected to the BC legislature in the 1952 provincial election at the Delta electoral district as a provincial Social Credit candidate. He was re-elected there for two more terms in the 1953 and 1956 provincial elections. From 1953 to 1957, he served as Speaker of the Assembly.

He was first elected at the Burnaby—Richmond riding in the 1957 general election as a Social Credit party member of Parliament. He served only one term there, the 23rd Canadian Parliament, after which he was defeated by John Drysdale of the Progressive Conservative party in the 1958 election. He was unsuccessful in his attempt to return to the BC Legislature in the 1960 provincial election.
