= John Melvin Bryan Sr. =

Canadian politician

John Melvin Bryan Sr. (August 4, 1886 – May 5, 1940) was a printer and political figure in British Columbia. He represented North Vancouver from 1924 to 1928 and Mackenzie from 1937 to 1940 in the Legislative Assembly of British Columbia as a Liberal.

He was born in Lucknow, Ontario, the son of James Bryan and Elizabeth Seli, and was educated there. In 1920, Bryan married Ethel Christine White. He was vice-president of the typographical union and also served on the North Vancouver municipal council. Bryan ran unsuccessfully for reelection to the assembly in 1933. He died in office in North Vancouver.

His son, John Melvin Bryan Jr., was also a member of the provincial assembly.

Bryan Arm, now included in the Nechako Reservoir, was named in his honour.
