= Carl Liden =

Canadian politician (1929–2010)

Carl Oswald Liden
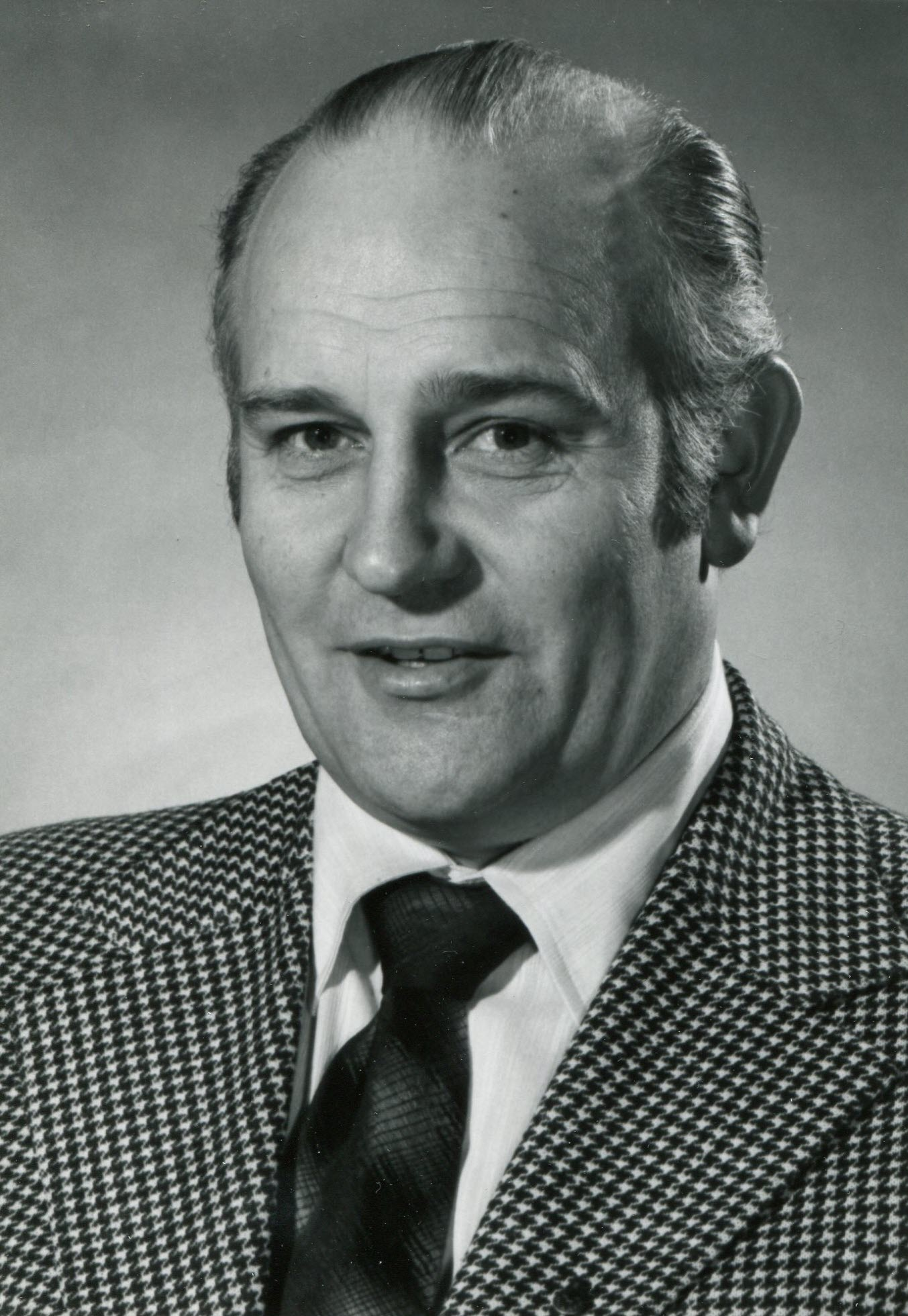

Member of the British Columbia Legislative Assembly for Delta
- In office August 30, 1972 – December 11, 1975
- Preceded by: Robert Wenman
- Succeeded by: Kenneth Walter Davidson

Personal details
- Born: February 3, 1929 Govan, Saskatchewan
- Died: March 21, 2010 (aged 81) Delta, British Columbia
- Party: New Democratic
- Occupation: Banker

Carl Oswald Liden (February 3, 1929 – March 21, 2010) was a political figure in British Columbia. He represented Delta in the Legislative Assembly of British Columbia from 1972 to 1975 as a New Democratic Party (NDP) member.

He was born in Govan, Saskatchewan, the son of Carl Ragnar Liden, and was educated in Surrey, British Columbia. Liden married Beverley Anne Hill in 1950. He worked for Delta Insurance. Liden was a member of the board of the Delta Credit Union, also serving as chair. He served on the municipal council for Delta from 1958 to 1963. Liden was also an administrator for the Laborers Medical and Benefit Plan. He ran unsuccessfully for a seat in the provincial assembly in 1969. Liden was defeated by Social Credit candidate Walter Davidson when he ran for reelection in 1975 and 1979. Liden served in the provincial cabinet as Minister of Transport and Communications. He died in an extended care home after suffering from a long illness.
