= John Melvin Bryan Jr. =

Canadian politician

MLA for North Vancouver
- In office 1956–1960

Personal details
- Born: September 8, 1893 Vancouver, British Columbia
- Died: January 8, 1992 (aged 79) North Vancouver, British Columbia
- Party: Social Credit Party of British Columbia

John Melvin Bryan Jr. (October 7, 1912 – January 8, 1992) was a Canadian politician and son of printer and politician John Melvin Bryan Sr. He served in the Legislative Assembly of British Columbia from 1956 to 1960, as a Social Credit member for the constituency of North Vancouver. He did not seek reelection in the 1960 provincial election.
