= Alexander Campbell Hope =

Canadian politician (1894–1978)

Alexander Campbell Hope (August 4, 1894 – August 25, 1978) was a farmer and political figure in British Columbia. He represented Delta in the Legislative Assembly of British Columbia from 1945 to 1952 as a Conservative.

He was born in Vancouver, British Columbia in 1894, the son of Charles Edward Hope, a native of England, and grew up in Vancouver and Fort Langley. Hope's farm near Fort Langley produced sheep, cattle, vegetables and holly. He served on the local school board and as reeve for Langley township. Hope ran unsuccessfully for a seat in the provincial assembly in 1941. He was a member of a Liberal-Conservative coalition which held a majority in the assembly. Hope was defeated when he ran for reelection in 1952. He served as a member of the provincial Agricultural Advisory Board, the B.C. Coast Vegetable Marketing Board, the B.C. Certified Seed Potatoes Growers Association and the provincial Federation of Agriculture. Hope was also president of the Fort Langley Restoration Society, the B.C. Farm Machinery Museum Association, the Fort Langley Improvement Society and the Fort Langley Board of Trade. In 1978, he died in Murrayville at the age of 84.
