= Frank Richter Jr. =

Canadian politician (1910-1977)

Leader of the Opposition of British Columbia
- In office June 5, 1973 – November 24, 1973
- Preceded by: W. A. C. Bennett
- Succeeded by: Bill Bennett

Member of the British Columbia Legislative Assembly for Boundary-Similkameen
- In office September 12, 1966 – November 3, 1975
- Preceded by: Riding established
- Succeeded by: Jim Hewitt

Member of the British Columbia Legislative Assembly for Similkameen
- In office June 9, 1953 – August 5, 1966
- Preceded by: Einar Gunderson
- Succeeded by: Riding abolished

Personal details
- Born: July 12, 1910 Keremeos, British Columbia, Canada
- Died: November 20, 1977 (aged 67) Brentwood Bay, British Columbia, Canada
- Party: Social Credit
- Spouse(s): Ina Lillian Gadberry (m. 1933) Sylvia Irene Reveley
- Parent: Frank Richter Sr. (father)

Francis Xavier Richter Jr. (July 12, 1910 – November 20, 1977) was a Canadian politician who served as a member of the Legislative Assembly (MLA) of British Columbia, representing the riding of Similkameen from 1953 to 1966 and its successor riding, Boundary-Similkameen, from 1966 to 1975. Part of the Social Credit Party caucus, he was a cabinet minister under Premier W. A. C. Bennett, and served briefly as leader of the Opposition following Bennett's resignation in 1973.

== Biography ==
Born in Keremeos, British Columbia, he was the youngest son of Florence Elizabeth Loudon and Frank Richter Sr., who settled in the Similkameen Country of the Southern Interior of British Columbia in 1864 and became a successful rancher and entrepreneur there. The elder Richter had five daughters and six sons, of whom the youngest was Frank Jr.

Originally a cattle rancher and fruit grower, Richter ran in the 1953 provincial election as a Social Credit (Socred) candidate, and was elected MLA for Similkameen. He was re-elected there in 1956 and in 1960, and was named Minister of Agriculture by Premier W. A. C. Bennett in November 1960; he kept the portfolio following his re-election in 1963.

Similkameen was redistributed into the new riding of Boundary-Similkameen in the 1966 election; Richter was re-elected there, and stayed on as agriculture minister before being re-assigned in May 1968, serving concurrently as Minister of Commercial Transport and Minister of Mines and Petroleum Resources. He won re-election in 1969 and retained both cabinet roles until the Socreds' defeat in 1972. Richter kept his seat in the legislature, and became leader of the Opposition after W. A. C. Bennett resigned as MLA in June 1973, serving until Bill Bennett took over that November. He did not run in the 1975 election.

He married his first wife Ina Gadberry in 1933, then met his second wife Sylvia Reveley while working at the Ministry of Mines. He died at Brentwood Bay at the age of 67.

British Columbia provincial government of William Andrew Cecil Bennett
Cabinet posts (3)
Predecessor	Office	Successor
Donald Leslie Brothers	Minister of Mines and Petroleum Resources; May 27, 1968 – September 15, 1972	Leo Nimsick
Robert Bonner	Minister of Commercial Transport; May 27, 1968 – September 15, 1972	James Gibson Lorimer
Newton Phillips Steacy	Minister of Agriculture; November 28, 1960 – May 27, 1968	Cyril Morley Shelford
