= Nehemiah George Massey =

Canadian politician

MLA for Delta
- In office 1956–1960

Personal details
- Born: September 5, 1903 Courtown near Gorey, County Wexford, Ireland
- Died: April 8, 1964 (aged 60) Delta, British Columbia
- Party: Social Credit Party of British Columbia
- Education: Hanford Trade School

Nehemiah George Massey (September 5, 1903 – April 8, 1964) was a Canadian politician. He served in the Legislative Assembly of British Columbia from 1956 to 1960, as a Social Credit member for the constituency of Delta. He was defeated when he sought a second term in the 1960 provincial election.

Massey was born in Courtown near Gorey, County Wexford, Ireland and immigrated to Canada in 1922 to avoid threats by the Irish Republican Army.

Massey lived in Regina and moved to Ladner, British Columbia in 1936. He worked at a logging camp, farm hand and mechanic.

== Honours ==
The George Massey Tunnel was renamed in his honour.
