= Donald Emerson Lewis =

Canadian politician (1930–1991)

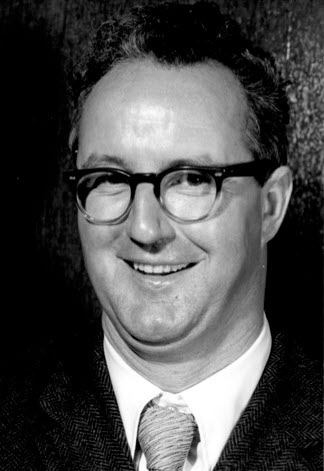

MLA for Shuswap
- In office 1972–1975

Personal details
- Born: March 14, 1930 Entwistle, Edmonton Census Division, Alberta, Canada
- Died: January 12, 1991 (aged 60) Sorrento, British Columbia
- Party: British Columbia New Democratic Party
- Spouse: Dorothy Irene Wilkinson

Donald Emerson Lewis (March 14, 1930 – January 12, 1991) was a Canadian politician. He served in the Legislative Assembly of British Columbia from 1972 to 1975, as a NDP member for the constituency of Shuswap. He was defeated by Social Credit candidate Leonard Bawtree when he ran for re-election in the 1975 provincial election.
