= Leonard Shepherd =

Canadian politician and businessman

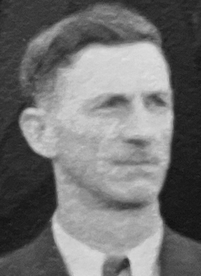

Leonard Alec Shepherd (February 18, 1897 – December 10, 1969) was a politician and businessman mostly connected with the City of Surrey, British Columbia, Canada. He was a Member of the Legislative Assembly (MLA) for the riding of Delta from 1937 until 1945 as a member of the Co-operative Commonwealth Federation. He was defeated in the 1945, 1949, 1952 and 1953 provincial elections as well as in a 1957 provincial byelection.

He was born in Tiddington, Oxfordshire, England and moved to the Lower Mainland of British Columbia in 1910 with his family. Shepherd served overseas during World War I. After the war, he worked as a wireless operator on coastal steamships. In 1921, he established a farm machinery business. Shepherd was also a member of the Surrey City Council and a member of the Surrey School Board. The former Len Shepherd Secondary School was named in his honour.

Shepherd died in New Westminster, British Columbia at the age of 71.
