= Newton Phillips Steacy =

Canadian politician

Newton Phillips Steacy (October 30, 1896 – July 7, 1969) was a political figure in British Columbia. He represented North Vancouver in the Legislative Assembly of British Columbia from 1956 to 1960 as a Social Credit member.

He was born in Vancouver, British Columbia, the son of A.R. Steacy and Frances A. Phillips. In 1921, Steacy married Ruth J. Clements. He was a local manager for Borden Co. Ltd. (a milk and dairy business). From 1957 to 1960, Steacy served in the provincial cabinet as Minister of Agriculture. He was defeated when he ran for reelection in 1960. After leaving politics, Steacy served as trade commissioner for British Columbia in San Francisco. He died in Victoria at the age of 72.
