= Lyle Wicks =

Canadian politician (1912–2004)

Member of the British Columbia Legislative Assembly for Dewdney
- In office 1952–1960
- Preceded by: Roderick Charles MacDonald
- Succeeded by: Dave Barrett

Personal details
- Born: November 1, 1912 Calgary, Alberta, Canada
- Died: February 3, 2004 (aged 91) Maple Ridge, British Columbia, Canada
- Party: British Columbia Social Credit Party
- Occupation: Streetcar operator

Lyle Wicks (November 1, 1912 – February 3, 2004) was a British Columbia politician.

Born in Calgary, Alberta, Wicks graduated from McLean High School in Haney, British Columbia, Canada in 1930. He was one of the first employees of the BC Plywoods Company (now defunct), and in 1940 he joined the BC Electric Railway Co., where he worked as a streetcar operator within the Vancouver transit system.

He joined the Social Credit movement in 1943 and became actively involved in its organisational efforts. From 1946 to 1948, Wicks was elected vice-president of the Social Credit Association of Canada, British Columbia Section. He also took on the position of chairman of the Vancouver and District Social Credit Council in 1948.

In 1949, Lyle Wicks was defeated as a Social Credit candidate in the Delta constituency. That year, he also became the founding president of the British Columbia Social Credit League. He was re-elected to this position until the time of his resignation in October 1952. As president, Wicks recruited W.A.C. Bennett to the nascent party after Bennett bolted the British Columbia Conservative Party to sit as an independent MLA in March 1951.

In the 1952 convention to elect the party's leader, both Wicks and Bennett were nominated for the party's leadership. Wicks and Bennett both withdrew in favour of Reverend Ernest George Hansell, an Alberta Social Credit MP hand-picked by Alberta Premier Ernest Manning to lead the British Columbia party. Following the June 1952 provincial election, which was unexpectedly won by Social Credit, Wicks called a new leadership convention at which only Social Credit MLAs could vote thus ending the influence of the Alberta party. The leadership vote was won by Bennett.

Wicks was elected MLA for the Dewdney constituency in the 1952 election; in August he was appointed Minister of Labour in Bennett's cabinet.

The first session of the Social Credit Party took place in 1953. In September 1956 Wicks was appointed Minister of Railways, a portfolio he held until March 1959, at which time he was appointed Minister of Commercial Transport. He also served as the acting Minister of Agriculture for one week in 1957. During his political career, he played an active role in the establishment of the Albion Ferry on the Fraser River, the development of Alouette Park, the establishment of the Maple Ridge and Mission Hospitals, the completion of the north shore highway connecting Agassiz to Hope, and in the construction of the Agassiz-Rosedale Bridge. He was made an Honorary Chief of the Kwakuitl Indian Nation in Harrison Hot Springs, BC in 1958. Wicks was defeated in the 1960 general election by future British Columbia Premier Dave Barrett.

From 1961 to 1973 he served as a member of the Board of the Public Utilities Commission, which was abolished in 1973. Lyle Wicks died in 2004 at a hospital in Maple Ridge, British Columbia.

The Lyle Wicks Papers, a collection of records documenting Wicks's political career, is housed at the Trinity Western University Archives.
