= John Donald Smith =

Canadian politician (1919–1997)

MLA for Victoria City
- In office 1956–1966

Personal details
- Born: September 12, 1919 Oil City, Ontario
- Died: October 22, 1997 (aged 78) Nanaimo, British Columbia
- Party: Social Credit Party of British Columbia
- Occupation: Politician

John Donald Smith (September 12, 1919 – October 22, 1997) was a Canadian politician. After an unsuccessful run in the 1952 provincial election, he served in the Legislative Assembly of British Columbia from 1956 to 1966 as a Social Credit member for the constituency of Victoria City.
