= James Henry Rhodes =

Canadian politician

James Henry Rhodes (November 13, 1930 – March 16, 2015) was a print shop owner and political figure in British Columbia. After being defeated in the 1956 provincial election, he represented Delta in the Legislative Assembly of British Columbia from 1960 to 1963 as a Co-operative Commonwealth Federation (CCF) member.

He was born in New Westminster, British Columbia and was educated in Cloverdale. Rhodes worked as chief clerk for Western Canadian Steel and later opened his own business, Fraser Printers. He was defeated when he ran for reelection to the provincial assembly in 1963. Rhodes served as chairman of the B.C. Petroleum Corporation; in 1975, he was named chairman of BC Hydro.
