= Gordon Dowding =

Canadian politician

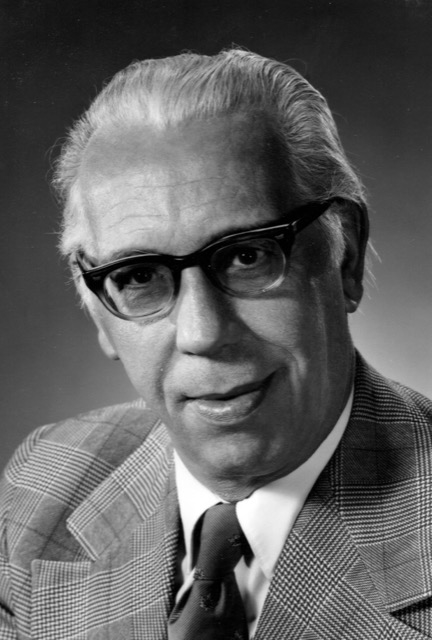

24th Speaker of the Legislative Assembly of British Columbia
- In office October 17, 1972 – November 3, 1975
- Preceded by: William Harvey Murray
- Succeeded by: Ed Smith

Member of the Legislative Assembly for Burnaby-Edmonds Burnaby (1956–1966)
- In office September 19, 1956 – December 11, 1975 Serving with Ernest Edward Winch (1956–1957), Cedric Cox (1957–1963), and Charles Willoughby MacSorley (1963–1966)
- Preceded by: Ernest Edward Winch
- Succeeded by: Raymond Loewen

Personal details
- Born: March 1, 1918 Kamloops, British Columbia
- Died: November 9, 2003 (aged 85) Maple Ridge, British Columbia
- Party: New Democratic

Gordon Hudson Dowding (March 1, 1918 – November 9, 2003) was a lawyer and politician in British Columbia, Canada. He represented Burnaby and then Burnaby-Edmonds in the Legislative Assembly of British Columbia from 1956 to 1975 as a CCF/NDP member.

He was born in Kamloops and educated there and at the University of British Columbia. In 1945, he married Gwen Olson. Dowding was called to the British Columbia bar in 1952 and the Alberta bar in 1967. He was an unsuccessful candidate in the provincial riding of Lillooet in 1952 and 1953. Dowding was the speaker of the British Columbia Legislature from 1972 to 1975 (he was the only incumbent NDP MLA not to be appointed to cabinet). He was defeated by Ray Loewen when he ran for reelection in 1975.

In 1962, Dowding was a founding member of the B.C. Civil Liberties Association. He died in 2003.
