= Camille Mather =

Canadian politician and nurse

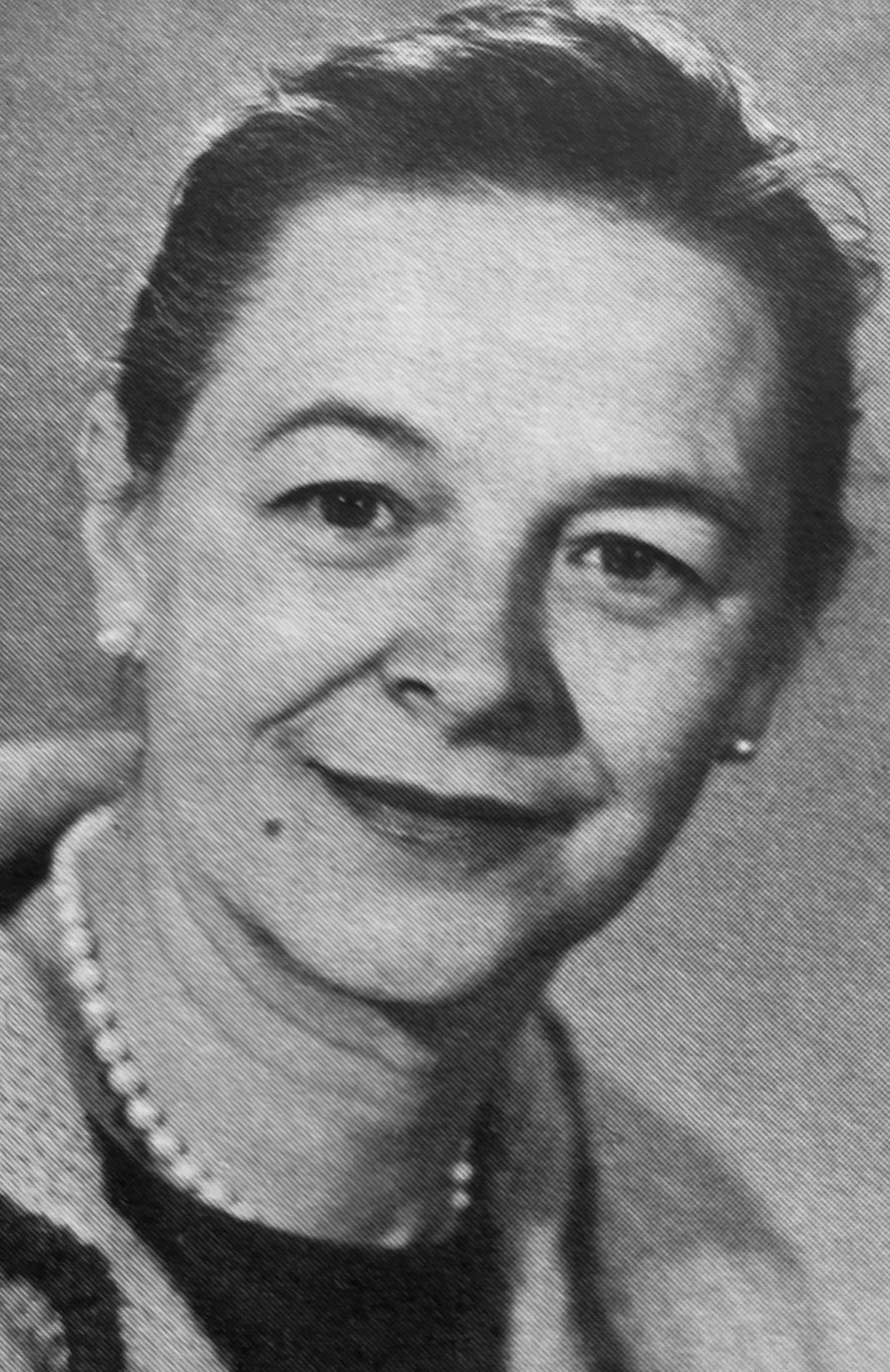

MLA for Delta
- In office 1960–1963

Personal details
- Born: Camille Mildred Swanson; March 16, 1912 Victoria, British Columbia
- Died: September 30, 2008 (aged 96) Surrey, British Columbia
- Party: British Columbia New Democratic Party

Camille Mildred Mather (March 16, 1912 – September 30, 2008) was a nurse and political figure. She represented Delta in the Legislative Assembly of British Columbia from 1960 to 1963 as a Co-operative Commonwealth Federation (CCF) member.

Born Camille Mildred Swanson in Victoria, she studied nursing at Royal Columbian Hospital in New Westminster and took additional training in psychiatry. She married Barry Mather. Mather served as a municipal councillor for Burnaby City Council during the 1950s; she also was a director for Burnaby General Hospital and a member of the Metropolitan Health Board. She was defeated when she ran for reelection to the provincial assembly in 1963. Mather was active in the campaign against nuclear testing. She died in Surrey, British Columbia in 2008.
