= Cedric Cox =

Canadian technician and politician (1913-1993)

MLA for Burnaby
- In office 1957–1963

Personal details
- Born: January 27, 1913 Rossland, British Columbia
- Died: May 10, 1993 (aged 80) Kamloops, British Columbia
- Party: British Columbia New Democratic Party

Cedric Cox (January 27, 1913 – May 10, 1993) was a technician and political figure in British Columbia. He represented Burnaby in the Legislative Assembly of British Columbia from 1957 to 1963 as a Co-operative Commonwealth Federation member.

He was born in Rossland, British Columbia. Cox worked as an industrial pattern maker in Trail and later worked for Heaps Engineering in Burnaby. He served in the Royal Canadian Navy during World War II. Cox married Eileen, the daughter of Ernest Winch. He was first elected to the assembly in a 1957 by-election held following his father-in-law's death and was reelected in 1960. Cox was defeated when he ran for reelection in 1963.

Cox became the Chairman of the Vancouver Fair Play for Cuba Committee in 1962 along with Phil Courneyeur who was elected Secretary. Cox was criticized for accepting a trip to Cuba in January 1963, shortly after the Cuban Missile Crisis, paid for by Fidel Castro's government. Upon his return from Cuba Cox addressed a joint meeting of the Burnaby Constituency CCF-NDP and the Oil, Atomic and Chemical Workers Union where he answered critics of his trip and affirmed he would return to the Caribbean Island country if invited. The speech is available in print at http://www.socialisthistory.ca/Docs/1961-/Cuba/FourCanadians.htm With Dick Fidler, John Glenn and Charles Biesick, he contributed to Four Canadians Who Saw Cuba, which was published by the Fair Play for Cuba Committee in 1963.
