= Bert Price =

Canadian politician and business owner (1907-1986)

Bert Price (April 10, 1907 – September 24, 1986) was a business owner and political figure in British Columbia, Canada. He represented Vancouver-Burrard in the Legislative Assembly of British Columbia from 1952 to 1966 and from 1969 to 1972 as a Social Credit member.

He was born in Vancouver, British Columbia, the son of Herbert Price and Florence Mills, natives of Wales. In 1929, Price married Hazel Winifred Brightmore. He operated a shoe service and a real estate company. Price served in the Royal Canadian Air Force during World War II. He was president of the Mount Pleasant Chamber of Commerce. Price was defeated when he ran for reelection to the provincial assembly in 1966. In 1968, he ran unsuccessfully in the federal riding of Fraser Valley West; his son Ron was an unsuccessful candidate in the federal riding of Burnaby—Seymour in the same year. He was re-elected to the B.C. Legislature in 1969 but was defeated a final time in the 1972 general election.

He died of cardiac arrest in 1986.
