= Eric Martin (politician) =

Canadian politician

Eric Charles Fitzgerald Martin

MLA for Vancouver-Burrard
- In office 1952–1966

Personal details
- Born: September 15, 1905 Winnipeg, Manitoba
- Died: April 23, 1973 (aged 67) Victoria, British Columbia
- Party: Social Credit Party of British Columbia

Eric Charles Fitzgerald Martin (September 15, 1905 – April 23, 1973) was an accountant, stock broker and political figure in British Columbia. He represented Vancouver-Burrard in the Legislative Assembly of British Columbia from 1952 to 1966 as a Social Credit member.

He was born in Winnipeg, Manitoba, the son of John Fitzgerald Martin and Margaret Edith Goodday, and was educated in London, England and Victoria, British Columbia. In 1941, Martin married Margaret Boyd. He served as a sergeant-instructor in the Canadian Army during World War II.

In 1945, Martin was an unsuccessful candidate in the federal riding of Vancouver Centre.

He ran unsuccessfully for a seat in the provincial assembly in 1945 and 1949 before being elected in 1952 in Vancouver-Burrard. He was only in second place in the first count. But BC used Instant runoff voting in that election and no candidate had a majority of votes in the first Count, so votes were transferred to produce a majority winner. Martin won in the end after some votes cast initially for Liberal and Progressive Conservative candidates were transferred to him, giving him a majority of votes still in play on the final count.

Martin served in the provincial cabinet as Minister of Health and Welfare and as Minister of Health Services and Hospital Insurance.

He did not run for re-election in 1966.

He died in 1973.

The Eric Martin Pavilion, formerly the Eric Martin Institute, of the Royal Jubilee Hospital was named in his honour.
