= John Douglas Tisdalle =

Canadian politician

John Douglas Tidball Tisdalle (May 31, 1917 – May 14, 1999) was a salesman and political figure in British Columbia.

== Early life ==
He was born in Victoria, British Columbia, the son of Arthur Tisdalle and E. Mulhulland. In 1938, Tisdalle married Helen Millhouse. Tisdalle published three books of poetry. He was married a second time to Maria.

== Career ==
He represented Saanich from 1953 to 1966 and Saanich and the Islands from 1966 to 1972 in the Legislative Assembly of British Columbia as a Social Credit member. He also ran once for Parliament, in the 1972 federal election.

== Death ==
He died of cancer at the age of 81.

John Tisdale published the following books:

- Rhymes of Time (1974)
- Rhymes of Time II (19??)
- Rhymes of Time III (1988)
