= Lorne Shantz =

Canadian politician

Member of the Legislative Assembly of British Columbia
- In office 1952–1963
- Preceded by: Charles William Morrow
- Succeeded by: George William McLeod
- Constituency: North Okanagan

Personal details
- Born: February 4, 1920 Alsask, Saskatchewan
- Died: October 2, 1999 (aged 79) Phoenix, Arizona, U.S.
- Party: Liberal
- Spouse(s): Genevieve E. Ansley; Marilyn Fenwick
- Children: 5
- Occupation: insurance agent

Lorne Hugh Shantz (February 4, 1920 – October 2, 1999) was a politician in British Columbia, Canada. He represented North Okanagan in the Legislative Assembly of British Columbia from 1952 to 1963 as a Social Credit member.

He was born in Alsask, Saskatchewan, the son of Jacob Y. Shantz and Emma Fern Lougheed, and was educated in Didsbury and Calgary. Before entering politics, Shantz was an insurance agent. In 1941, he married Genevieve E. Ansley. He ran unsuccessfully for a seat in the British Columbia assembly in 1949. Shantz lived in Langley. He was deputy speaker for the assembly in 1953 and then speaker for the assembly from 1958 to 1963. In 1964, he and his family moved to Prescott, Arizona. His wife, Genevieve, died on August 4, 1968; he remarried to Marilyn (Fenwick) in 1975.

Lorne Shantz died October 2, 1999, in Phoenix, Arizona.
