= Robert Strachan (politician) =

Canadian politician

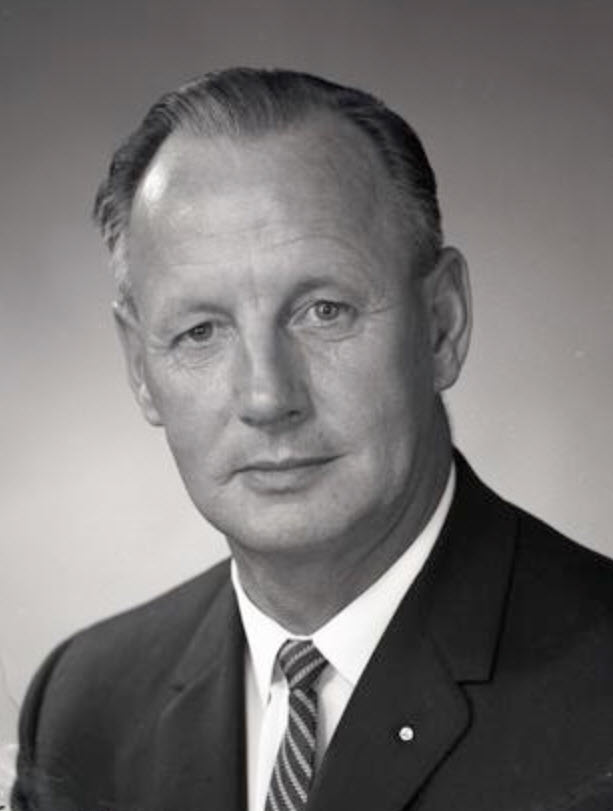

Leader of the Opposition of British Columbia
- In office April 6, 1956 – April 12, 1969
- Preceded by: Arnold Webster
- Succeeded by: Thomas R. Berger

Leader of the British Columbia Co-operative Commonwealth Federation/New Democratic Party
- In office April 6, 1956 – April 12, 1969
- Preceded by: Arnold Webster
- Succeeded by: Thomas R. Berger

Member of the Legislative Assembly for Cowichan-Malahat Cowichan-Newcastle (1952–1966)
- In office June 12, 1952 – October 5, 1975
- Preceded by: Andrew Mowatt Whisker
- Succeeded by: Barbara Wallace

Personal details
- Born: December 1, 1913 Glasgow, Scotland
- Died: July 21, 1981 (aged 67) Victoria, British Columbia
- Cause of death: Lung Cancer
- Party: New Democratic
- Occupation: Carpenter/Trade Unionist

Robert Martin Strachan (December 1, 1913 – July 21, 1981) was a trade unionist and politician. He was the longest serving Leader of the Opposition in British Columbia history.

Born in Glasgow, Scotland, Strachan was a carpenter by trade. He immigrated to Canada after quitting a 10-shilling-a-week job as messenger boy in Glasgow to go to Nova Scotia on a $10-a-week farm labour scheme. He moved west, in 1931, to the northern B.C. copper-smelting town of Anyox and then to Powell River, where he became a carpenter and an active unionist eventually becoming British Columbia head of the United Brotherhood of Carpenters and Joiners of America.

In 1952, he was elected to the British Columbia Legislative Assembly as an MLA for the socialist Co-operative Commonwealth Federation. In 1956, he was elected CCF leader thus becoming Leader of the Opposition to the Social Credit government of W.A.C. Bennett. Strachan's CCF ran in the 1960 general election on the platform of nationalizing the province's private hydro-electric company, B.C. Electric. Bennett denounced the idea during the election campaign but, in 1961, turned around and announced plans to do exactly that in order to create BC Hydro leading Strachan to denounce the Social Credit government as hypocrites.

He remained leader after the party transformed into the British Columbia New Democratic Party in 1961. He defeated a leadership challenge by Thomas Berger in 1967, and stepped down in 1969.

Strachan remained in the legislature, and was appointed Highways Minister when the NDP formed government for the first time as a result of the 1972 general election. He was appointed to the new position of Minister of Commercial Transport and Communications in 1973 (seven days after his appointment to this new portfolio, it was renamed Ministry of Transport and Communications). Strachan oversaw the implementation of the NDP's promise to institute public automobile insurance and was responsible for the creation of the government-owned Insurance Corporation of British Columbia. Strachan left politics in 1975 when he was appointed the province's agent general to the United Kingdom by Premier Dave Barrett. He served in the position for almost two years.

He died of lung cancer in 1981.

Preceded by Arnold Webster	Leader of the Opposition in the British Columbia Legislature; 1956–1969	Succeeded by Thomas Berger
