= Leo Nimsick =

Canadian politician

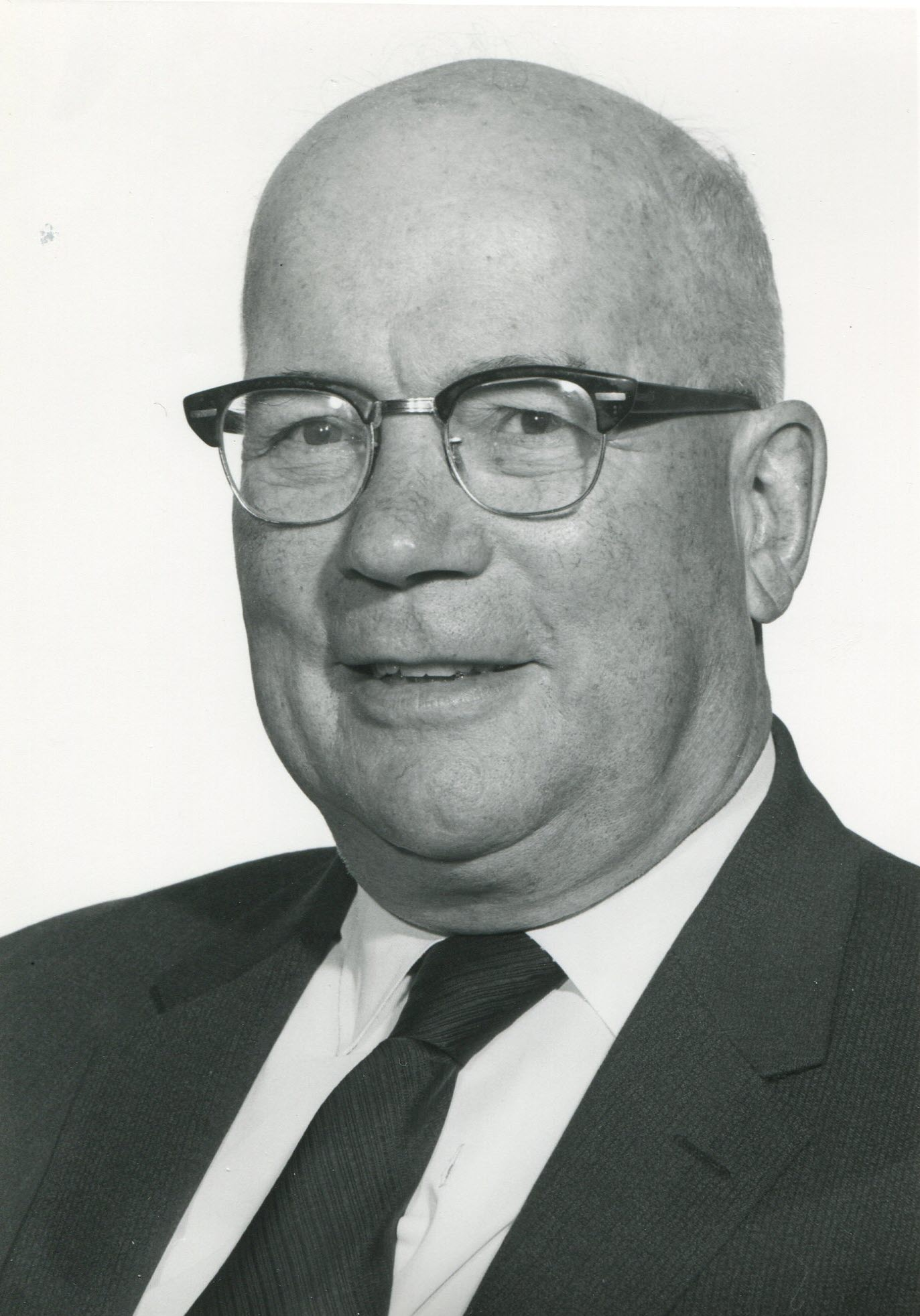

Member of the British Columbia Legislative Assembly for Kootenay Cranbrook (1949–66)
- In office June 15, 1949 – December 11, 1975
- Preceded by: Frank William Green
- Succeeded by: George Wayne Haddad

Personal details
- Born: Leo Thomas Nimsick; January 26, 1908 Rossland, British Columbia
- Died: February 8, 1999 (aged 91) Cranbrook, British Columbia
- Party: New Democratic; Co-operative Commonwealth Federation
- Spouse: Marie K. Zimmer
- Occupation: miner, farmer

Leo Thomas Nimsick (January 26, 1908 – February 8, 1999) was a political figure in British Columbia. He represented Cranbrook from 1949 to 1966 and Kootenay from 1966 to 1975 in the Legislative Assembly of British Columbia as a Co-operative Commonwealth Federation and then New Democratic Party member.

He was born in Rossland, British Columbia, the son of Thomas Nimsick and Anna Caesar. In 1934, he married Marie K. Zimmer. Nimsick worked at diamond drilling and dairy farming; he later worked for Cominco for 40 years, retiring in 1968. He served four years as an alderman for Rossland. Nimsick ran unsuccessfully for a seat in the provincial assembly in 1937. He ran for the leadership of the CCF in 1956, coming second to Robert Strachan. Nimsick later served in the provincial cabinet as Minister of Mines and Petroleum Resources and as Minister of Travel Industry.

He died in 1999 at the age of 91.
