= Stanley John Squire =

Canadian politician

MLA for Alberni
- In office 1952–1966
- Preceded by: James Mowat
- Succeeded by: Howard Richmond McDiarmid

Personal details
- Born: November 24, 1915 Nanaimo, British Columbia
- Died: June 7, 1998 (aged 82) Nanaimo, British Columbia
- Party: Co-operative Commonwealth Federation

Stanley John Squire (November 24, 1915 – June 7, 1998) was a machinist and political figure in British Columbia. He represented Alberni in the Legislative Assembly of British Columbia from 1952 to 1966 as a Co-operative Commonwealth Federation and then New Democratic Party member.

He was born in Nanaimo, British Columbia in 1915 and was educated there. In 1937, Squire married Frances Patricia Degnan. He served as an alderman for Port Alberni. Squire was defeated when he ran for reelection in 1966 and 1969. After leaving politics, he served as business agent for the International Woodworkers of America local. He died in 1998.

A bursary is awarded in his name by the Port Alberni & District Labour Council.
