= 18th Parliament of British Columbia =

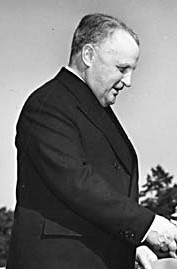

The 18th Legislative Assembly of British Columbia sat from 1934 to 1937. The members were elected in the British Columbia general election held in November 1933. The Liberal Party, led by Thomas Dufferin Pattullo, formed the government. The Co-operative Commonwealth Federation (CCF) formed the official opposition.

Henry George Thomas Perry served as speaker for the assembly.

== Members of the 18th Parliament ==
The following members were elected to the assembly in 1933:

Member	Electoral district	Party	First elected / previously elected	No.# of term(s)
George Sharratt Pearson	Alberni-Nanaimo	Liberal	1928	2nd term
William James Asselstine	Atlin	Liberal	1933	1st term
Ernest Edward Winch	Burnaby	CCF	1933	1st term
Donald Morrison MacKay (Note: appointed Commissioner of Indian Affairs, 1937)	Cariboo	Liberal	1933	1st term
Edward Dodsley Barrow	Chilliwack	Liberal	1916, 1933	4th term*
William Henry Sutherland	Columbia-Revelstoke	Liberal	1916	5th term
Thomas King (1934)	Columbia-Revelstoke	Liberal	1931, 1934	2nd term*
Laurence Arnold Hanna	Comox	Liberal	1928	2nd term
Hugh George Egioke Savage	Cowichan-Newcastle	Oxford Group Movement	1933	1st term
Frank Mitchell MacPherson	Cranbrook	Liberal	1928	2nd term
Robert Swailes	Delta	CCF (Note: Left the CCF in August 1936 to create the British Columbia Social Constructive Party.)	1933	1st term
Robert Swailes	Delta	Social Constructives	1933	1st term
David William Strachan	Dewdney	Liberal	1933	1st term
Robert Henry Pooley	Esquimalt	Unionist	1912	6th term
Thomas Aubert Uphill	Fernie	Independent Labour Party	1920	4th term
Henry George Thomas Perry	Fort George	Liberal	1920, 1933	3rd term*
Dougald MacPherson	Grand Forks-Greenwood	Liberal	1925, 1933	2nd term*
Alexander McDonald	The Islands	Liberal	1933	1st term
Robert Henry Carson	Kamloops	Liberal	1933	1st term
Charles Sidney Leary	Kaslo-Slocan	Liberal	1924, 1933	2nd term*
George Matheson Murray	Lillooet	Liberal	1933	1st term
Ernest Bakewell	Mackenzie	CCF	1933	1st term
Ernest Bakewell	Mackenzie	Social Constructives	1933	1st term
Frank Putnam	Nelson-Creston	Liberal	1933	1st term
Arthur Wellesley Gray	New Westminster	Liberal	1924	3rd term
Kenneth Cattanach MacDonald	North Okanagan	Liberal	1916, 1933	4th term*
Harley Christian Erskine Anderson	North Vancouver	CCF	1933	1st term
Dorothy Steeves (1934)	North Vancouver	CCF	1934	1st term
Alexander Malcolm Manson	Omineca	Liberal	1916	5th term
Mark Matthew Connelly (1936)	Omineca	Liberal	1936	1st term
Clive Montgomery Francis Planta	Peace River	Non-Partisan Independent Group	1933	1st term
Thomas Dufferin Pattullo	Prince Rupert	Liberal	1916	5th term
Richard Ronald Burns	Rossland-Trail	Liberal	1933	1st term
Norman William Whittaker	Saanich	Liberal	1933	1st term
Rolf Wallgren Bruhn	Salmon Arm	Non-Partisan Independent Group	1924	3rd term
Charles Herbert Percy Tupper	Similkameen	Liberal	1933	1st term
Edward Tourtellotte Kenney	Skeena	Liberal	1933	1st term
Joseph Allen Harris	South Okanagan	Liberal	1933	1st term
Gerald Grattan McGeer	Vancouver-Burrard	Liberal	1916, (Note: Richmond) 1933	2nd term*
Helen Douglas Smith	Vancouver-Burrard	Liberal	1933	1st term
John Howard Forester (1936)	Vancouver-Burrard	Liberal	1936	1st term
Gordon McGregor Sloan (Note: appointed to Court of Appeal on April 5, 1937)	Vancouver Centre	Liberal	1933	1st term
Gordon Sylvester Wismer	Vancouver Centre	Liberal	1933	1st term
John Price	Vancouver East	CCF	1933	1st term
Harold Edward Winch	Vancouver East	CCF	1933	1st term
Stanley Stewart McKeen	Vancouver-Point Grey	Liberal	1933	1st term
George Moir Weir	Vancouver-Point Grey	Liberal	1933	1st term
Robert Wilkinson	Vancouver-Point Grey	Liberal	1933	1st term
Herbert Anscomb	Victoria City	Independent	1933	1st term
Robert Connell	Victoria City	CCF	1933	1st term
Robert Connell	Victoria City	Social Constructives	1933	1st term
John Hart	Victoria City	Liberal	1916, 1933	3rd term*
Byron Ingemar Johnson	Victoria City	Liberal	1933	1st term
John Joseph Alban Gillis	Yale	Liberal	1928	2nd term

== Party standings ==
Affiliation	Members
Liberal	34
Co-operative Commonwealth	7
Non-Partisan Independent Group	2
Independent	2
Unionist	1
Independent Labour	1
Total	47
Government Majority	21

== By-elections ==
By-elections were held to replace members for various reasons:

Electoral district	Member elected	Party	Election date	Reason
Columbia	Thomas King (Note: elected by acclaimation)	Liberal	March 8, 1934	Re-establishment of Columbia electoral district
North Vancouver	Dorothy Steeves	CCF	July 14, 1934	H.C.E. Anderson died April 17, 1934
Omineca	Mark Matthew Connelly	Liberal	June 22, 1936	A.M. Manson resigned September 14, 1935, to contest federal election
Vancouver-Burrard	John Howard Forester	Liberal	September 1, 1936	G.G. McGeer resigned October 1, 1935, to contest federal election
