= 1933 British Columbia general election =

Canadian provincial election

- November 2, 1933

47 seats of the Legislative Assembly of British Columbia 24 seats needed for a majority
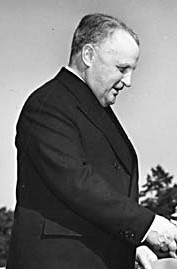

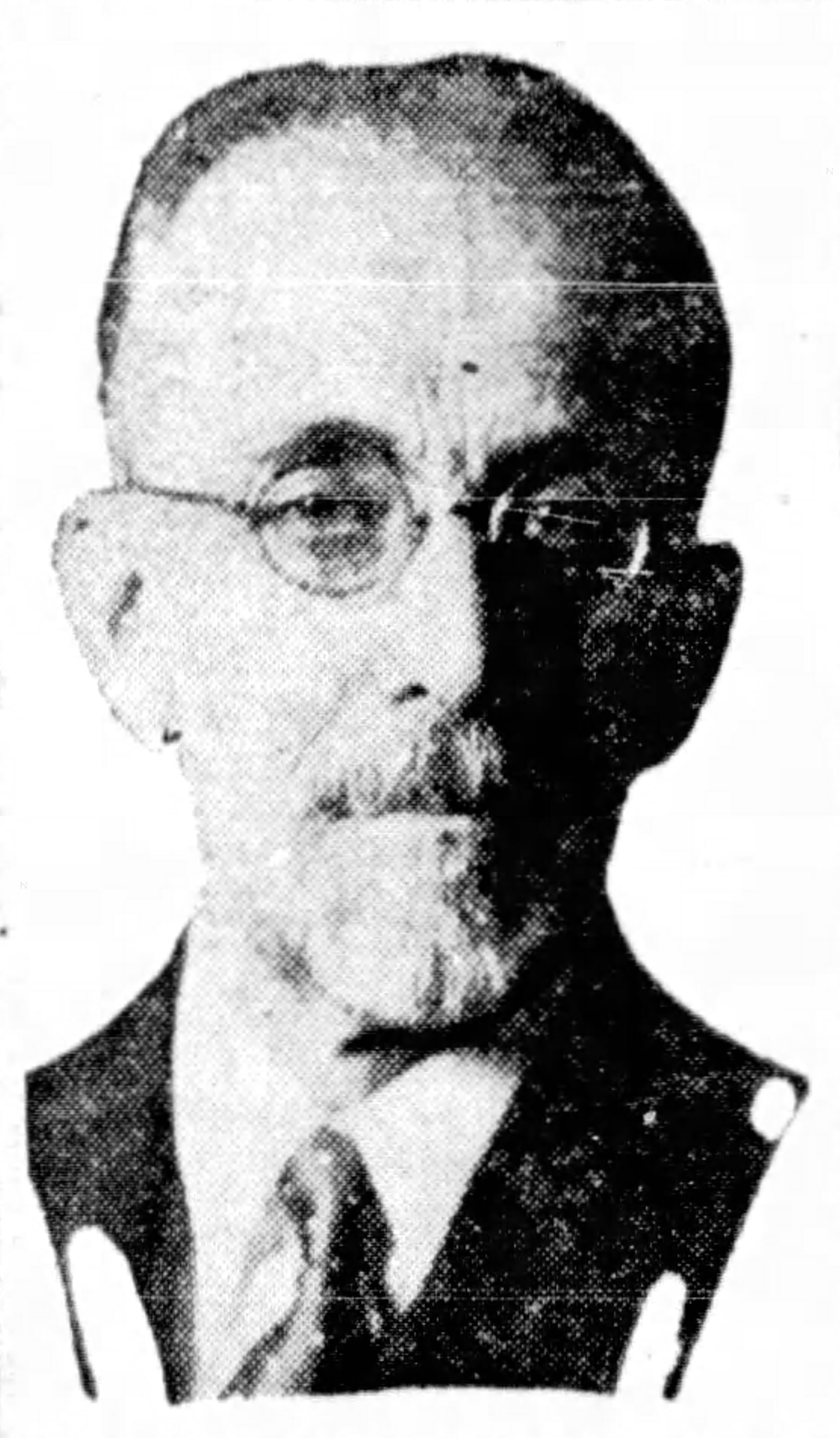

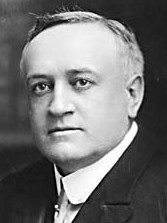

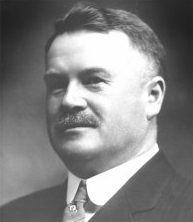
	First party	Second party
Leader	Thomas Dufferin Pattullo	Robert Connell
Party	Liberal	Co-operative Commonwealth
Leader since	1928	1933
Leader's seat	Prince Rupert	Victoria City
Last election	12	pre-creation
Seats won	34	7
Seat change	▲22	▲7
Popular vote	159,131	120,185
Percentage	41.74%	31.53%
Swing	▲1.70pp	pre-creation
	Third party	Fourth party
Leader	William John Bowser † (Note: Bowser died prior to the election.)	Simon Fraser Tolmie
Party	Non-Partisan Independent Group	Unionist
Leader since	1933	1933
Leader's seat	Did not run	Saanich (lost re-election)
Last election	Did not contest	35 (Note: Result for the Conservative Party of British Columbia.)
Seats won	2	1
Seat change	▲2	▼34 (Note: Compared to the Conservative Party of British Columbia.)
Popular vote	38,836	15,445
Percentage	10.19%	4.05%
Swing	new	▼49.25pp
Premier before election
Simon Fraser Tolmie
Conservative
Premier after election
Thomas Dufferin Pattullo
Liberal

The 1933 British Columbia general election was the eighteenth general election in the Province of British Columbia, Canada. It was held to elect members of the Legislative Assembly of British Columbia. The election was called on September 13, 1933, and held on November 2, 1933. The new legislature met for the first time on February 20, 1934.

The Liberal Party won a majority government.

The Official Opposition was formed by the social democratic Co-operative Commonwealth Federation, which was contesting its first election.

Because of internal discord, the provincial executive of the Conservative Party decided not to contest the election officially. Instead, each local association was to act on its own. Some candidates ran as independents, some as Independent Conservatives. Those supporting the premier, Simon Fraser Tolmie, ran as Unionist Party of British Columbia, and those grouped around William John Bowser, a former premier, ran as the Non-Partisan Independent Group. When Bowser died on October 25, the elections in Vancouver Centre and Victoria City were postponed to November 27, and the following candidates withdrew:

- in Vancouver Centre, one each from the Unionists, NPIG and United Front
- in Victoria City, one Unionist, three NPIG and one Independent

Other notable races include the election of Bridge River-Lillooet News publisher George Matheson Murray in Lillooet over Conservative Ernest Crawford Carson. Carson's brother Robert Henry Carson ran as a Liberal, winning Kamloops. Carson and his brother both served as cabinet ministers in later regimes. They were the sons of Robert Carson, an American who was one of the very few survivors of an Indian attack on a wagon train on the Oregon Trail and who went on to found one of the early ranches at Pavilion and whose holdings became part of the Diamond S Ranch.

== 1932 redistribution of ridings ==
An Act was passed in 1932, providing for a reduction of the seats in the Assembly from 48 to 47 upon the next election. The following changes were made:

Abolished ridings	New ridings
Drawn from other ridings
	Peace River
Merger of districts
Alberni; Nanaimo	Alberni-Nanaimo
Columbia; Revelstoke	Columbia-Revelstoke
Nelson; Creston	Nelson-Creston
Reorganization of districts
Richmond-Point Grey (1 MLA); South Vancouver (1 MLA); Vancouver City (6 MLAs)	Vancouver-Burrard (2 MLAs); Vancouver Centre (2 MLAs); Vancouver East (2 MLAs); Vancouver-Point Grey (3 MLAs)

== 1934 post-election redistribution ==
A 1934 Act increased the size of the Assembly from 47 to 48, by abolishing the district of Columbia-Revelstoke and reviving the previous districts of Columbia and Revelstoke, with immediate effect. William Henry Sutherland was declared the MLA for Revelstoke, and Thomas King (Liberal) was acclaimed in Columbia in the subsequent byelection.

== Results ==
Elections to the 18th Legislative Assembly of British Columbia (1933)
Political party	Party leader	MLAs				Votes			
Political party	Party leader	Candidates	1928	1933	±	#	±	%	± (pp)
Liberal	Duff Pattullo	47	12	34	22▲	159,131	14,259▲	41.74	1.70▲
Co-operative Commonwealth	Robert Connell	46	–	7	7▲	120,185	120,185▲	31.53	New
Conservative fragmentation									
█ Non-Partisan Independent Group	William John Bowser	30		2		38,836		10.19	
█ Unionist	Simon Fraser Tolmie	12		1		15,445		4.05	
█ Independent Conservative		6		–		7,114		1.87	
█ Independent		4		–		2,193		0.58	
█ Oxford Group		1		1		1,655		0.43	
All Conservative factions		53	35	4	31▼	65,243	128,688▼	17.12	36.18▼
Independent		24	–	1	1▲	25,658	22,000▲	6.73	5.72▲
Labour (all factions)		4	1	1	Steady	2,357	15,867▼	0.62	4.42▼
United Front (Workers and Farmers)		20	–	–	–	4,584	4,584▲	1.20	New
Independent Co-operative Commonwealth		8	–	–	–	2,266	2,266▲	0.59	New
Independent Liberal		2	–	–	–	1,076	75	0.28	–
Socialist		5	–	–	–	370	370▲	0.10	Returned
Progressive Liberal		1	–	–	–	353	353▲	0.09	New
Total		210	48	47		381,223		100.00%	
Rejected ballots						3,380 (Note: Incomplete)	121▲		
Actual voters who voted						236,415	61,481▲	73.07%	1.74▲
Registered voters						323,540	78,300▲		

Seats and popular vote by party
Party	Seats	Votes	Change (pp)
█ Liberal	34 / 47	41.74%	1.70
█ Co-operative Commonwealth	7 / 47	31.53%	31.53
█ Conservative (all factions)	4 / 47	17.12%	-36.18
█ Independent	1 / 47	6.73%	5.72
█ Labour	1 / 47	0.62%	-4.42
█ Other	0 / 47	2.26%	1.65

== MLAs elected ==
Alberni-Nanaimo: George Sharratt Pearson
Atlin: William James Asselstine
Burnaby: Ernest Winch
Cariboo: Donald Morrison MacKay
Chilliwack: Edward Dodsley Barrow
Columbia-Revelstoke: William Henry Sutherland
Comox: Laurence Arnold Hanna
Cowichan-Newcastle: Hugh Savage (OG)
Cranbrook: Frank Mitchell MacPherson
Delta: Robert Swailes
Dewdney: David William Strachan
Esquimalt: Robert Henry Pooley
Fernie: Thomas Aubert Uphill (ILP)
Fort George: Henry George Thomas Perry
Grand Forks-Greenwood: Dougald MacPherson
The Islands: Alexander McDonald
Kamloops: Robert Henry Carson
Kaslo-Slocan: Charles Sidney Leary
Lillooet: George Murray
Mackenzie: Ernest Bakewell
Nelson-Creston: Frank Putnam
New Westminster: Wells Gray
North Okanagan: Kenneth Cattanach MacDonald
North Vancouver: Harley Anderson
Omineca: Alexander Malcolm Manson
Peace River: Clive Planta
Prince Rupert: Duff Pattullo
Rossland-Trail: Richard Ronald Burns
Saanich: Norman William Whittaker
Salmon Arm: Rolf Wallgren Bruhn
Similkameen: Charles H. P. Tupper
Skeena: Edward Tourtellotte Kenney
South Okanagan: Joseph Allen Harris
Vancouver-Burrard: Gerry McGeer
Vancouver-Burrard: Helen Douglas Smith
Vancouver Centre: Gordon McGregor Sloan
Vancouver Centre: Gordon Sylvester Wismer
Vancouver East: John Price
Vancouver East: Harold Winch
Vancouver-Point Grey: George Moir Weir
Vancouver-Point Grey: Stanley McKeen
Vancouver-Point Grey: Robert Wilkinson
Victoria City: John Hart
Victoria City: Boss Johnson
Victoria City: Robert Connell
Victoria City: Herbert Anscomb
Yale: John Joseph Alban Gillis

=== Synopsis of results ===
Results by riding - 1933 British Columbia general election (single-member districts)
Riding	Winning party						Votes								
Name	1928	Party	Votes	Share	Margin #	Margin %	Lib	CCF	NP	Un	O-C	UF	Ind	Oth	Total
Alberni-Nanaimo	New	Lib	3,146	47.47%	793	11.96%	3,146	2,353	781	–	–	185	162	–	6,627
Atlin	Lib	Lib	419	32.63%	111	8.64%	419	308	–	–	136	–	421 (Note: The incumbent Herbert Frederick Kergin received 267 votes.)	–	1,284
Burnaby	Con	CCF	4,548	39.27%	528	4.55%	4,020	4,548	519	1,051	–	694	22	726	11,580
Cariboo	Con	Lib	1,089	54.50%	578	28.92%	1,089	398	511	–	–	–	–	–	1,998
Chilliwack	Con	Lib	2,273	44.96%	618	12.23%	2,273	1,655	1,128	–	–	–	–	–	5,056
Columbia-Revelstoke	New	Lib	1,947	72.27%	1,200	44.54%	1,947	747	–	–	–	–	–	–	2,694
Comox	Con	Lib	2,204	49.94%	614	13.91%	2,204	1,590	–	–	–	259	84	276	4,413
Cowichan-Newcastle	Con	OG	1,655	40.88%	367	9.06%	520	1,288	–	–	2,240 (Note: The incumbent Cyril Francis Davie received 585 votes.)	–	–	–	4,048
Cranbrook	Lib	Lib	2,951	69.53%	1,720	40.52%	2,951	1,231	–	–	–	62	–	–	4,244
Delta	Con	CCF	2,631	36.95%	538	7.55%	2,093	2,631	–	–	612 (Note: The incumbent John Walter Berry received 447 votes.)	49	1,735	–	7,120
Dewdney	Con	Lib	1,235	30.34%	166	4.08%	1,235	967	1,069	–	–	127	673	–	4,071
Esquimalt	Con	Un	1,466	39.03%	59	1.57%	1,407	525	358	1,466	–	–	–	–	3,756
Fernie	ILP	ILP	1,693	56.58%	394	13.16%	1,299	–	–	–	–	–	–	1,693	2,992
Fort George	Con	Lib	1,577	56.32%	952	34.00%	1,577	625	310	–	–	192	–	96	2,800
Grand Forks-Greenwood	Con	Lib	1,034	58.55%	523	29.61%	1,034	221	511	–	–	–	–	–	1,766
The Islands	Con	Lib	726	35.35%	57	2.78%	726	400	233	–	669	–	26	–	2,054
Kamloops	Con	Lib	1,836	44.76%	476	11.61%	1,836	1,360	906	–	–	–	–	–	4,102
Kaslo-Slocan	Con	Lib	1,250	45.05%	299	10.78%	1,250	574	951	–	–	–	–	–	2,775
Lillooet	Con	Lib	927	44.06%	222	10.55%	927	472	705	–	–	–	–	–	2,104
Mackenzie	Con	CCF	2,071	43.61%	685	14.42%	1,386	2,071	1,292	–	–	–	–	–	4,749
Nelson-Creston	New	Lib	2,489	49.19%	1,187	23.46%	2,489	1,161	1,302	–	–	125	–	–	5,060
New Westminster	Lib	Lib	2,694	46.98%	1,218	21.24%	2,694	1,476	–	–	–	125	1,439	–	5,734
North Okanagan	Con	Lib	2,322	48.01%	676	13.97%	2,322	868	1,646	–	–	–	–	–	4,836
North Vancouver	Lib	CCF	2,427	35.19%	643	9.32%	1,636	2,427	1,784 (Note: Jack Loutet had been elected as a Conservative in a 1930 byelection)	–	–	132	7	911 (Note: John Melvin Bryan Sr., previously elected as a Liberal in 1924, ran as an Independent Liberal and received 846 votes)	6,897
Omineca	Lib	Lib	1,079	52.23%		%	1,079	538	355	–	–	–	94	–	2,066
Peace River	New	NP	957	37.31%	157	6.12%	749	800	957	–	–	59	–	–	2,565
Prince Rupert	Lib	Lib	1,725	64.90%	1,060	39.88%	1,725	665	–	–	–	268	–	–	2,658
Rossland-Trail	Con	Lib	1,729	43.84%	415	10.52%	1,729	901	1,314	–	–	–	–	–	3,944
Saanich	Con	Lib	2,171	37.97%	348	6.09%	2,171	1,216	508	1,823	–	–	–	–	5,718
Salmon Arm	Con	NP	1,351	44.82%	463	15.36%	888	603	1,351	–	–	172	–	–	3,014
Similkameen	Con	Lib	1,765	43.23%	379	9.28%	1,765	730	1,386	–	–	–	202	–	4,083
Skeena	Lib	Lib	902	56.34%	451	28.17%	902	451	–	–	–	–	248	–	1,601
South Okanagan	Con	Lib	1,636	36.66%	191	4.28%	1,636	1,382	–	–	1,445	–	–	–	4,463
Yale	Lib	Lib	1,193	68.64%	881	50.69%	1,193	233	312	–	–	–	–	–	1,738

= open seat
= winning candidate was in previous Legislature
= incumbent had switched allegiance
= previously incumbent in another riding
= not incumbent; was previously elected to the Legislature
= incumbency arose from byelection gain
= other incumbents renominated
= Conservative factions
= multiple candidates

Results by riding - 1933 British Columbia general election (multiple-member districts)
Riding		Winning party		Votes								
Name	MLAs	1928	1933	Lib	CCF	NP	Un	O-C	UF	Ind	Oth	Total
Vancouver-Burrard	2	New	2	19,139	12,857	5,642	1,733	–	235	–	616	40,222
Vancouver Centre	2	New	2	13,648	10,454	–	–	2,741	646	–	834	28,323
Vancouver East	2	New	2	14,171	21,991	2,450	404	–	1,002	418	656	41,092
Vancouver-Point Grey	3	New	3	31,436	22,330	10,555	6,152	–	174	902	111	71,660
Victoria City	4	4	2 1 1	24,420	15,138	–	2,816	3,119	95	19,225	503	65,316

= election day deferred

== See also ==
- List of British Columbia political parties
