= Harry Denyer Francis =

Canadian politician

Member of the Legislative Assembly of British Columbia
- In office June 12, 1952 – October 4, 1952
- Preceded by: Maurice Finnerty
- Succeeded by: Einar Maynard Gunderson
- Constituency: Similkameen

Personal details
- Born: July 28, 1921 Victoria, British Columbia
- Died: May 2, 1987 (aged 65) Victoria, British Columbia
- Party: British Columbia Social Credit Party
- Spouse: Grace Richmond
- Occupation: minister

Harry Denyer Francis (July 28, 1921 – May 2, 1987) was a Canadian politician. He served in the Legislative Assembly of British Columbia briefly in 1952 from the electoral district of Similkameen, a member of the Social Credit party. He later resigned his seat in order for then-unelected finance minister Einar Maynard Gunderson to run for a seat in the legislature. At the time of his initial election, he was a minister, and the pastor at the Osoyoos Pentecostal Church in Osoyoos, British Columbia. He later worked in Revelstoke, British Columbia following his resignation. He was also an unsuccessful Social Credit Party candidate in the 1953 provincial election in the riding of Revelstoke. He died in 1987 following a cerebral hemorrhage.
