= Arthur Brown Ritchie =

Canadian politician (1885–1977)

Member of the Legislative Assembly of British Columbia
- In office 1945–1952
- Preceded by: Rolf Wallgren Bruhn
- Succeeded by: James Allan Reid
- Constituency: Salmon Arm

Personal details
- Born: October 18, 1885 Peebles, Scotland
- Died: April 20, 1977 (aged 91) Salmon Arm, British Columbia
- Party: Coalition
- Spouse: Olive Beloud
- Children: 4
- Occupation: Farmer

Arthur Brown Ritchie (October 18, 1885 – April 20, 1977) was a Canadian politician. He served in the Legislative Assembly of British Columbia from 1945 to 1952 from the electoral district of Salmon Arm, a member of the Coalition government.
