= Dorothy Steeves =

Canadian politician (1891-1978)

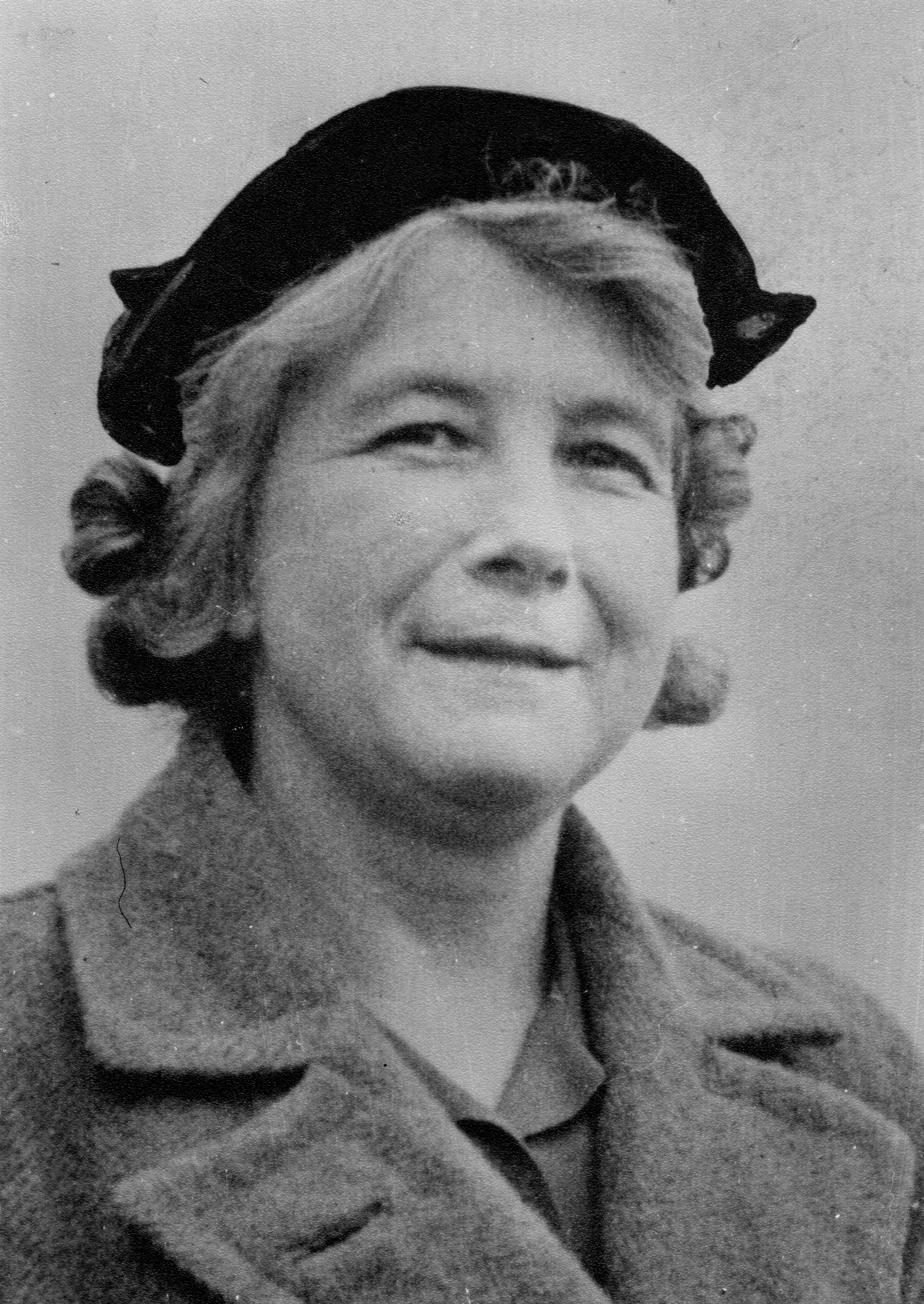

Member of the Legislative Assembly of British Columbia
- In office July 14, 1934 – August 31, 1945
- Preceded by: Harley Anderson
- Succeeded by: John Henry Cates
- Constituency: North Vancouver

Personal details
- Born: Dorothy Gretchen Biersteker; May 26, 1891 Amsterdam, Netherlands
- Died: May 9, 1978 (aged 86) Vancouver, British Columbia
- Party: British Columbia CCF
- Other political affiliations: New Democratic Party
- Spouse: Rufus Palmer Steeves
- Education: Leiden University
- Occupation: Lawyer

Dorothy Gretchen Steeves (née Biersteker; May 26, 1891 – May 9, 1978) was a Dutch-born political figure in British Columbia, Canada. A founding member of the Co-operative Commonwealth Federation (CCF), she represented North Vancouver in the Legislative Assembly of British Columbia from 1934 to 1945. Her interests included civil liberties, international affairs, nuclear disarmament, protection of animals, women's issues and abolition of capital punishment.

== Biography ==
Born in Amsterdam as the eldest of three children to a Dutch physician and a British teacher, she studied law and economics at Leiden University, receiving a Bachelor of Laws degree in 1916. She then briefly worked at private practices in Amsterdam and The Hague before joining a Dutch government rationing bureau as legal adviser during World War I. She married Rufus Palmer Steeves, an officer in the Canadian Army, and came to Vancouver, British Columbia in January 1919. She worked at the Dutch consulate for a short time, and served on the Point Grey Town Planning Commission between 1926 and 1929.

After an unsuccessful run as a CCF candidate in Vancouver-Point Grey in the 1933 provincial election, she won a 1934 by-election triggered by the death of Harley Anderson, and became member of the provincial legislature for North Vancouver. She was re-elected in 1937 and 1941, then lost to John Henry Cates in 1945. She tried to re-enter the provincial legislature by running in a 1946 by-election in Vancouver-Point Grey, the 1952 and 1953 provincial elections in her old riding of North Vancouver, and a 1956 by-election in Vancouver Centre, but was unsuccessful in all attempts. She also ran federally as a CCF candidate in Burnaby—Richmond in 1949, and for the New Democratic Party (successor to the CCF) in Vancouver Quadra in 1963, but was defeated both times.

Away from the legislature, Steeves served in CCF executives at the provincial and federal levels, including as vice-president for the BC CCF's provincial council in 1949, and as provincial council president in 1950. She wrote The Compassionate Rebel: Ernest E. Winch and his times, published in 1960, and Builders and Rebels: A short History of the CCF from 1932 to 1961. She died on May 9, 1978.

== Electoral record ==
1933 British Columbia general election: Vancouver-Point Grey
Party	Candidate	Votes	%	Elected
Liberal	George Moir Weir	12,163	16.97	✓
Liberal	Stanley Stewart McKeen	9,880	13.79	✓
Liberal	Robert Wilkinson	9,393	13.11	✓
Co-operative Commonwealth	William Arthur Pritchard	7,693	10.74	
Co-operative Commonwealth	Frank Ebenezer Buck	7,423	10.36	
Co-operative Commonwealth	Dorothy Steeves	7,214	10.07	
Non-Partisan Independent Group	Dugald Donaghy	5,130	7.16	
Non-Partisan Independent Group	George Alexander Walkem	3,694	5.15	
Unionist	William Savage	2,640	3.68	
Unionist	Frederick DeWolfe Turner	2,078	2.90	
Non-Partisan Independent Group	Laura Dickey MacKay	1,731	2.41	
Unionist	Alice Townley	1,434	2.00	
Independent	William McNeill	902	1.26	
United Front (Workers and Farmers)	George Drayton	174	0.24	
Independent Co-operative Commonwealth	Edwin Clarke Appleby	111	0.15	
Total valid votes		71,660	100.00	
Total rejected ballots		608		

1963 Canadian federal election: Vancouver Quadra
Party	Candidate	Votes	%	±%
Liberal	Grant Deachman	15,160	41.73	+10.66
Progressive Conservative	Howard Charles Green	13,756	37.87	–7.59
New Democratic	Dorothy Steeves	5,324	14.66	–2.49
Social Credit	James P.R. Mason	2,085	5.74	–0.59
Total valid votes		36,325	99.53	
Total rejected ballots		170	0.47	–0.32
Turnout		36,495	84.29	+4.81
Eligible voters		43,299		
Liberal gain from Progressive Conservative		Swing		+9.12
Source: Library of Parliament
