= George Faulds Stirling =

Canadian politician (1877–1966)

MLA for Salmon Arm
- In office 1942–1945

Personal details
- Born: February 26, 1877 Middlesbrough, England, United Kingdom
- Died: November 7, 1966 (aged 89) Victoria, British Columbia
- Party: Co-operative Commonwealth Federation

George Faulds Stirling (February 26, 1877 – November 7, 1966) was an English-born educator, rancher and political figure in British Columbia. He represented Salmon Arm in the Legislative Assembly of British Columbia from 1942 to 1945 as a Co-operative Commonwealth Federation (CCF) member.

He was born in Middlesbrough and moved to Canada in the early 1900s. Stirling first worked in lumber camps in British Columbia as a logger and carpenter. He next worked as a clerk and immigration agent, then as a teacher in the Okanagan region. Stirling ran unsuccessfully for a seat in the provincial assembly in 1912 as a Socialist candidate, in 1924 as a Labour candidate and in 1933 and 1937 as a CCF candidate before being elected in a 1942 by-election held after the death of Rolf Wallgren Bruhn. He was defeated when he ran for re-election in 1945. He also ran unsuccessfully for the Kamloops federal seat in 1935. Stirling later owned a ranch on Shuswap Lake. He died November 7, 1966, in Victoria at the age of 89.
