= Bernard Webber =

Bernard Webber may refer to:

- Bernard C. Webber (1928–2009), coxswain of a US Coast Guard motor lifeboat
- USCGC Bernard C. Webber, Sentinel class cutter, named for the coxswain
- Bernard George Webber (1914–2000), Canadian politician and educator
