= Margaret Hobbs =

Canadian politician and educator

Margaret F. Hobbs

Member of the Legislative Assembly of British Columbia
- In office 1962–1963
- Preceded by: George Hobbs
- Succeeded by: Arvid Lundell
- Constituency: Revelstoke

Personal details
- Born: Margaret Frances Jackson; March 15, 1909 Berwick, Ontario, Canada
- Died: August 14, 1997 (aged 88) Victoria, British Columbia, Canada
- Party: Co-operative Commonwealth Federation
- Spouse: George Hobbs
- Occupation: educator

Margaret Frances Hobbs (née Jackson; March 15, 1909 – August 14, 1997) was an educator and political figure in British Columbia. She represented Revelstoke in the Legislative Assembly of British Columbia from 1962 to 1963 as a Co-operative Commonwealth Federation (CCF) member.

She was born in Berwick, Ontario and was educated in Manitoba. She married George Hobbs. She was elected to the provincial assembly in a 1962 by-election held following the death of her husband. She was defeated when she ran for reelection in 1963. Originally a resident of Revelstoke, Hobbs later moved to Victoria and died there in 1997.

== Electoral results ==
British Columbia provincial by-election, September 4, 1962: Revelstoke
Party	Candidate	Votes	%
NDP-CCF	Margaret Hobbs	1,127	42.12
Social Credit	Arvid Lundell	1,066	39.84
Liberal	John Wallace Johnston	483	18.05
Total valid votes		2,676	
Total rejected ballots		15	
Called upon the death of G. Hobbs on 30 January 1962.
Source: http://www.elections.bc.ca/docs/rpt/1871-1986_ElectoralHistoryofBC.pdf

1963 British Columbia general election: Revelstoke
Party	Candidate	Votes	%
Social Credit	Arvid Lundell	1,176	41.3
New Democratic	Margaret Hobbs	1,071	37.8
Liberal	William James Burnett	385	13.5
Progressive Conservative	Owen Orlando Williams	211	7.4
Total valid votes		2,843	
Total rejected ballots		15	
Turnout		77.2	
Source: http://www.elections.bc.ca/docs/rpt/1871-1986_ElectoralHistoryofBC.pdf
