= Reginald Robert Laird =

Canadian politician

Member of the Legislative Assembly of British Columbia
- In office 1945–1949
- Preceded by: Bernard George Webber
- Succeeded by: Maurice Patrick Finnerty
- Constituency: Similkameen

Personal details
- Born: August 6, 1913 Cranbrook, British Columbia
- Died: November 29, 1970 (aged 57) Vancouver, British Columbia
- Party: Coalition
- Spouse: Francesca Bahrle
- Education: University of British Columbia; Queen's University
- Occupation: Physician

Reginald Robert Laird (August 6, 1913 – November 29, 1970) was a Canadian politician. He served in the Legislative Assembly of British Columbia from 1945 to 1949 from the electoral district of Similkameen, a member of the Coalition government.
