= William James Johnson =

William James Johnson may refer to:

- William Johnson (Australian politician) (1871–1916), Australian politician and soldier
- William James Johnson (Canadian politician) (1881–1949), member of the Legislative Assembly of British Columbia
- William Johnson (cricketer, born 1884) (1884–1941), Australian wine and spirit grocer and cricketer
