= Arthur Ritchie =

Arthur Ritchie may refer to:

- Arthur Brown Ritchie (1885–1977), Canadian politician
- Arthur David Ritchie (1891–1967), British philosopher
- Arthur Ritchie (priest) (1849–1921), American Anglo-Catholic priest
