= Harry Johnston (Canadian politician) =

Member of the Legislative Assembly of British Columbia
- In office 1937–1943
- Preceded by: William Henry Sutherland
- Succeeded by: Vincent Segur
- Constituency: Revelstoke

Personal details
- Born: November 5, 1883 Teeswater, Ontario
- Died: January 20, 1943 (aged 59) Arrowhead, British Columbia
- Party: British Columbia Liberal Party
- Spouse: Jessie Whitbread
- Children: 2
- Occupation: Timber producer

Harry Bruce Johnston (November 5, 1883 – January 20, 1943) was a Canadian politician, who served in the Legislative Assembly of British Columbia.

== Early life ==
Harry was born on November 5, 1883, to James Johnston and Mary Victoria Ross in Teeswater, Ontario, where he completed his secondary education. In 1906, he arrived in Arrowhead, British Columbia, becoming a merchant. By 1905, Edward McGaghran owned a general store, carrying a wide range of products. The next year, Jessie Whitbread became an employee, and Harry Johnston became a partner in the renamed McGaghran & Johnston store, which expanded into men's furnishings, while retaining a groceries line. McGaghran, who trained as a millwright, was superintendent of the Arrow Lakes Lumber Co mill at Arrowhead at the time of his death in 1912. In 1918, Johnston expanded into the lumber business. He produced and retailed cedar poles and posts. By 1919, he was also secretary of the local school board. His interest in the general store ceased around 1920. Prior to entering politics, he managed Columbia River Timbers.

== Political career ==
Winning the Revelstoke seat for the Liberal Party in 1937 and 1941, he served in the Legislative Assembly of British Columbia until his death on January 20, 1943, at Arrowhead. Premier John Hart and several cabinet members attended the funeral. This seat, which the Liberals had held since 1916, was lost in the June 1943 byelection.

== Marriage and children ==
In 1908, he married Jessie Whitbread (1884–1971). Their children were John Wallace (1911–1988) and Effie Lorena Jean (1913–1989). John unsuccessfully ran in the September 1962 byelection for his father's old seat.
