= Non-Partisan Independent Group =

Former provincial political grouping in British Columbia

- Leader: William John Bowser
- Founded: 1933
- Split from: Conservative Party of British Columbia

The Non-Partisan Independent Group was a provincial political grouping in British Columbia, Canada, led by former premier William John Bowser. It contested the 1933 British Columbia general election following the fragmentation of the governing Conservative Party, electing two members of the Legislative Assembly of British Columbia.

== History ==
The group emerged in 1933 amid opposition to Premier Simon Fraser Tolmie within the Conservative Party. Bowser returned to provincial politics as leader of the Non-Partisans, advocating moderate reform, administrative efficiency and lower taxes. The group attracted Conservatives dissatisfied with Tolmie's leadership, while Tolmie's supporters contested the election under the Unionist banner.

Bowser secured nominations in both Vancouver Centre and Victoria City, but died on October 25, 1933, during the election campaign.

The group fielded 30 candidates and received 38,836 votes, or 10.19% of the provincial total. Rolf Wallgren Bruhn retained Salmon Arm, while Clive Planta won the newly created Peace River constituency. The Conservative Party contested the next provincial election in 1937 under its own name.

== Members of the Legislative Assembly ==
Two candidates were elected under the group's banner in 1933.

MLA	Constituency	Elected for the group
Rolf Wallgren Bruhn	Salmon Arm	1933
Clive Planta	Peace River	1933

== Electoral results ==
Election	Leader	Candidates	Seats won	Votes	Vote share
1933	William John Bowser (Note: Bowser died during the election campaign.)	30	2 / 47	38,836	10.19%

Source: Elections British Columbia.
