= William Alexander McKenzie =

Canadian politician (1874–1966)

William Alexander McKenzie (January 29, 1874 – July 8, 1966 ) was a builder and political figure in British Columbia. He represented Similkameen in the Legislative Assembly of British Columbia from 1918 to 1933 as a Conservative.

He was born in Puslinch, Ontario, the son of William McKenzie and the former Miss Mary Brown, and was educated there. In 1910, McKenzie married Florence Mary Thompson (28 Feb 1886 - 10 Feb 1959)the daughter of James Walden Thompson (1856 Biddulph, Ontario - 1923 Penticton, B.C.) and Isabella Murray McMillan (1859 Nissouria, Ontario - 1950 Esquimalt, B.C.). . He was a resident of Penticton from 1906 and served as reeve in 1917. McKenzie was first elected to the provincial assembly in a 1918 by-election held after Lytton Wilmot Shatford was named to the Canadian senate. Between 1928 and 1933, he was a member of the provincial cabinet, serving as Minister of Mines and Minister of Labour. He moved to Victoria after being named to cabinet. McKenzie was defeated by Charles Herbert Percy Tupper when he ran for reelection in 1933. He died in Victoria. One of his four children, Hon. Lloyd George McKenzie, Q.C. (1918–2005), after retiring from the bench of the Supreme Court of British Columbia in 1993, acted for ten years as Information Officer for the Court of Appeal and Supreme Court, a position without precedent.
