= Charles William Parker =

Canadian politician

Member of the Legislative Assembly of British Columbia
- In office 1952–1956
- Preceded by: Glen Everton Braden
- Succeeded by: none
- Constituency: Peace River

Personal details
- Born: December 20, 1912 Calgary, Alberta
- Died: June 11, 1997 (aged 84) Saanichton, British Columbia
- Party: British Columbia Social Credit Party
- Spouse: Christina Mary McDonald
- Occupation: minister

Charles William Parker (December 20, 1912 – June 11, 1997) was a clergyman and political figure in British Columbia, Canada. He represented Peace River from 1952 to 1956 in the Legislative Assembly of British Columbia as a Social Credit member.

He was born the son of John Parker and Anne Fido, and was educated in Calgary. In 1939, he married Christina Mary McDonald. Parker was a minister for the Church of the Nazarene. He ran unsuccessfully for reelection in the provincial riding of Cowichan-Newcastle in 1956. He died on June 11, 1997, in Saanichton, British Columbia.
