= Thomas Taylor (Canadian politician) =

Canadian politician

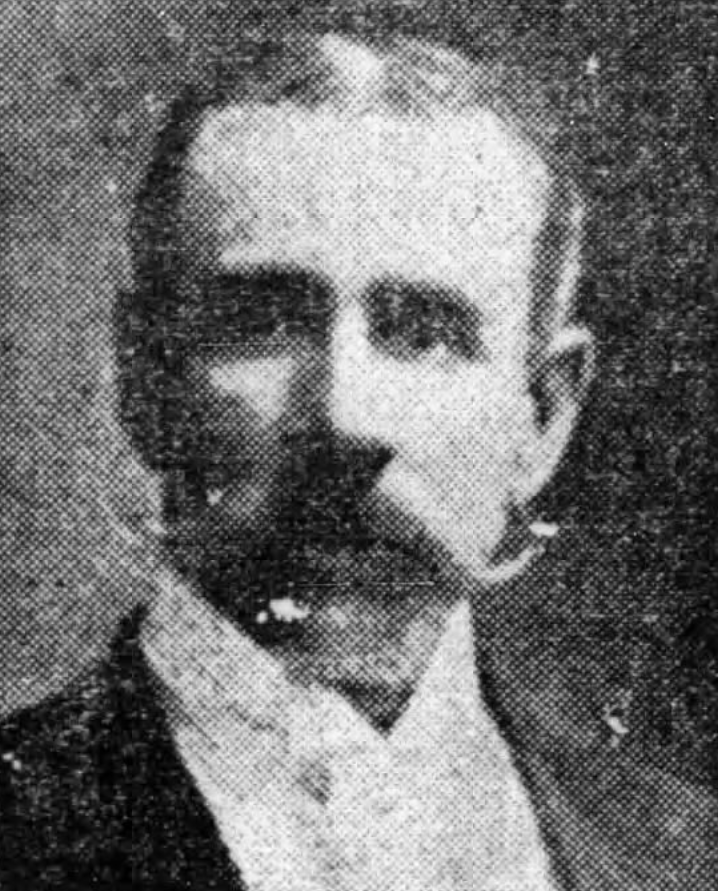

Member of the Legislative Assembly of British Columbia
- In office 1903–1916
- Constituency: Revelstoke

Member of the Legislative Assembly of British Columbia
- In office 1900–1903
- Constituency: West Kootenay-Revelstoke

Personal details
- Born: February 4, 1865 London, Canada West
- Died: April 26, 1947 (aged 82) Vancouver, British Columbia
- Party: Conservative
- Spouse: Georgie Larson (m. 1895)
- Occupation: Businessman, politician

Thomas Taylor (February 4, 1865 – April 26, 1947) was a businessman and political figure in British Columbia. He represented West Kootenay-Revelstoke from 1900 to 1903 and Revelstoke from 1903 to 1916 as a Conservative in the Legislative Assembly of British Columbia.

He was born in London, Canada West, the son of Thomas Taylor and Anne Talbot, and was educated there. Taylor then articled in law in London for two years. In 1885, he moved to Winnipeg and then came to British Columbia in 1888, settling in Revelstoke in 1900. Taylor married Georgie Larson in 1895. He served in the provincial cabinet as Minister of Public Works from December 1908 to December 1915 and then again between March and November 1916, as Minister of Railways from March 1911 to December 1915 and then again between March and November 1916, as Minister of Education between December 1915 and June 1916, and as Provincial Secretary between December 1915 and June 1916. Taylor was defeated by William Henry Sutherland when he ran for reelection in 1916. He died in Vancouver at the age of 82.

Mount Tom Taylor was named in his honour. Taylor had played an important role in the development of Strathcona Provincial Park while serving as Minister of Public Works.
