= George Hobbs =

Canadian politician

Member of the Legislative Assembly of British Columbia
- In office 1960–1962
- Preceded by: Arvid Lundell
- Succeeded by: Margaret Hobbs
- Constituency: Revelstoke

Personal details
- Born: March 23, 1907 County Waterford, Ireland
- Died: January 30, 1962 (aged 54) Victoria, British Columbia
- Party: Co-operative Commonwealth Federation
- Spouse: Margaret Jackson
- Occupation: railway engineer

George "Tiny" Hobbs (March 23, 1907 – January 30, 1962) was an Irish-born railway engineer and political figure in British Columbia. After being defeated in the 1956 provincial election, he represented Revelstoke in the Legislative Assembly of British Columbia from 1960 to 1962 as a Co-operative Commonwealth Federation (CCF) member.

He was born in County Waterford and was educated there. After coming to Canada, Hobbs married Margaret Jackson, a school teacher. He worked from the Canadian Pacific Railway at Revelstoke. Hobbs served as a school trustee for Revelstoke from 1948 to 1960. He died suddenly in office in 1962 and his wife was elected to represent Revelstoke in the by-election that followed.
