= Unionist Party of British Columbia =

Former provincial political party in Canada

- Leader: Simon Fraser Tolmie
- Founded: 1933
- Split from: Conservative Party of British Columbia
- Ideology: Conservatism

The Unionist Party of British Columbia was a provincial political grouping in British Columbia, Canada, led by Premier Simon Fraser Tolmie. It contested the 1933 British Columbia general election following the fragmentation of the governing Conservative Party, winning one seat in the Legislative Assembly of British Columbia.

== History ==
During the Great Depression, Tolmie proposed forming a non-partisan union government to address the province's economic crisis. Liberal leader Duff Pattullo and former Conservative premier William John Bowser rejected his invitation to participate. The Conservative organization also declined to endorse the proposal, leaving the decision to individual constituency associations.

In the 1933 election, Tolmie's supporters stood as Unionists, while Bowser led the rival Non-Partisan Independent Group. Other Conservatives contested the election as independents. The Unionists received 15,445 votes, or 4.05% of the provincial total, and elected only Robert Henry Pooley in Esquimalt. Tolmie lost his seat in Saanich, and Pattullo's Liberals formed the government.

The Conservative Party contested the next provincial election in 1937 under its own name.

== Members of the Legislative Assembly ==
The party elected one MLA in the 1933 election.

MLA	Constituency	Elected as a Unionist
Robert Henry Pooley	Esquimalt	1933

== Electoral results ==
Election	Leader	Candidates	Seats won	Votes	Vote share
1933	Simon Fraser Tolmie	12	1 / 47	15,445	4.05%

Source: Elections British Columbia.
