= Columbia-Revelstoke =

Defunct provincial electoral district in British Columbia, Canada

Columbia-Revelstoke was a provincial electoral district for the Legislative Assembly of British Columbia, Canada. It made its only appearance on the hustings in the general election of 1933.

== Electoral history ==
Note: Winners of each election are in bold.

18th British Columbia election, 1933
Party	Candidate	Votes	%	±	Expenditures
Co-operative Commonwealth Fed.	Vincent Segur	747	27.73%		unknown
**Liberal**	**William Henry Sutherland**	**1,947**	**72.27%**		unknown
Total valid votes		2,694	100.00%		
Total rejected ballots		15			
Turnout		%			

The Columbia-Revelstoke riding was used only in the 1933 election. From 1937 onwards part of the area was part of Columbia and the Revelstoke area formed the Revelstoke riding.

== See also ==
- List of British Columbia provincial electoral districts
- Canadian provincial electoral districts
