= CKOR =

Radio station in Penticton

Coordinates: 49°25′25″N 119°34′19″W

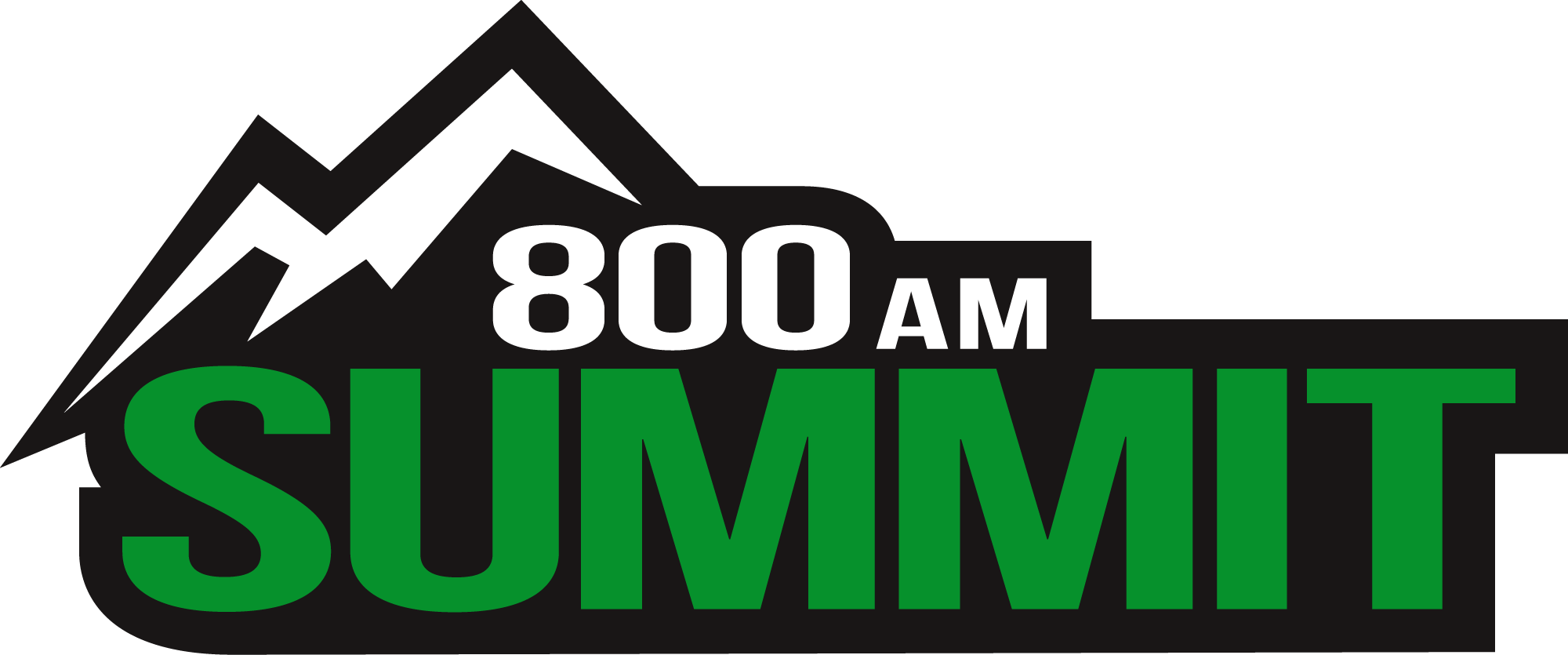
- Penticton, British Columbia; Canada
- Broadcast area: Okanagan-Similkameen
- Frequency: 800 kHz
- Branding: 800 Summit

Programming
- Format: Adult hits

Ownership
- Owner: Vista Radio
- Sister stations: CJMG-FM

History
- First air date: 1946 (as a rebroadcaster of CKOV); September 1948 (as a separate station)
- Former call signs: CKOK (1946–1991)
- Call sign meaning: Okanagan Radio

Technical information
- Class: B
- Power: 10,000 watts day; 500 watts night

Links
- Webcast: Listen Live
- Website: www.mysouthokanagannow.com

CKOR (800 AM) is a Canadian radio station in Penticton, British Columbia. Vista Radio owns the station, which operates with 10,000 watts of transmission power in the daytime and 500 watts at night, and airs a classic hits format under the Summit brand. CKOR uses a non-directional antenna at all times.

== History ==
CKOR was first signed on in 1946 by Okanagan Broadcasters Ltd., the owner of Kelowna radio station CKOV, as CKOK, a rebroadcaster of the Kelowna station, at its original frequency of 1450 AM with 250 watts of power. In 1948, CKOK moved to its current spot on the AM dial, and in September that year, became autonomous from CKOV as it began airing its own schedule.

In 1950, CKOK increased its power to 1000 watts in the daytime and 500 watts at night. By 1957, CKOK Ltd. was established as the station's owner, and it was an affiliate of CBC Radio's Dominion Network. After the Dominion Network dissolved, the station was an affiliate of the main CBC Radio network until 1985 when the CBC licensed CBTP-FM. The station ran a reduced amount of CBC programing from 1977 having moved the CBC programing to CKOK-FM. Two of the principal owners were Maurice Finnerty and Roy Chapman. Chapman eventually relinquished his portion to the Finnerty family. Maurice Finnerty served as Provincial MLA for Okanagan-Similkameen from 1949 to 1952 and was mayor of Penticton from 1962 to 1967. CKOK's daytime power was increased to 10 kilowatts in 1960, and on June 1, 1965, station parent CKOK Ltd. signed on CKOK-FM, which mostly simulcast its AM sister's programming in the beginning. On April 14, 1972, ownership of CKOK, CKOK-FM and parent company Okanagan Radio Ltd. (the successor of CKOK Ltd.) was transferred from the Finnerty family to Fraser Valley Broadcasters Ltd. (the owner of CHWK Chilliwack and CFVR Abbotsford). With Gerald Pash as the Managing Director, the station was named AM Station of the Year by the British Columbia Association of Broadcasters in 1973. In September 1974 Fraser Valley Broadcasters sold Okanagan Radio Limited to Dennis Barkman, Ken Davis and Gerald Pash. Pash was named BC Associations of Broadcasters "Broadcaster Citizen of the Year" in 1983 and he was Penticton "Citizen of the Year" in 1985.

CKOK disaffiliated from the CBC in 1977. CKOK-FM changed its call sign to CKOR-FM and in 1986 to its present call sign of CJMG. In 1985, the CRTC granted CKOK permission to move to 780 AM and to increase its power to 20,000 watts in the daytime and 10,000 watts at night, but the station never made the move as it remained at its present frequency and power. In 1988, Okanagan Skeena Group acquired the interest of Barkman and Pash, and then the interest of Ken Davis in 1990. CKOK adopted its present call sign of CKOR (taken from the former calls of its FM sister) in 1991.

In 1999, Telemedia purchased Okanagan Skeena Group and its broadcasting assets (including CKOR); shortly after, CKOR adopted Telemedia's EZ Rock brand. In 2002, CKOR and the other former Okanagan Skeena stations were purchased by Standard Radio, which in turn was purchased on September 27, 2007 by Astral Media, the current owner of CKOR. Bell Media then acquired the stations when it purchased Astral Media.

As part of a mass format reorganization by Bell Media, on May 18, 2021, CKOR flipped to adult hits under the Bounce branding. It is currently one of only two AM stations under the brand.

On February 8, 2024, Bell announced a restructuring that included the sale of 45 of its 103 radio stations to seven buyers, subject to approval by the CRTC, including CKOR, which is to be sold to Vista Radio. The application was approved on February 13, 2025.

The sale took effect April 14, 2025 and Vista rebranded the station to Classic Hits as 800 Summit.

== Former logos ==
2009-2021

2021-2025
