= Joseph Hardcastle Corsbie =

Canadian politician (1913–1992)

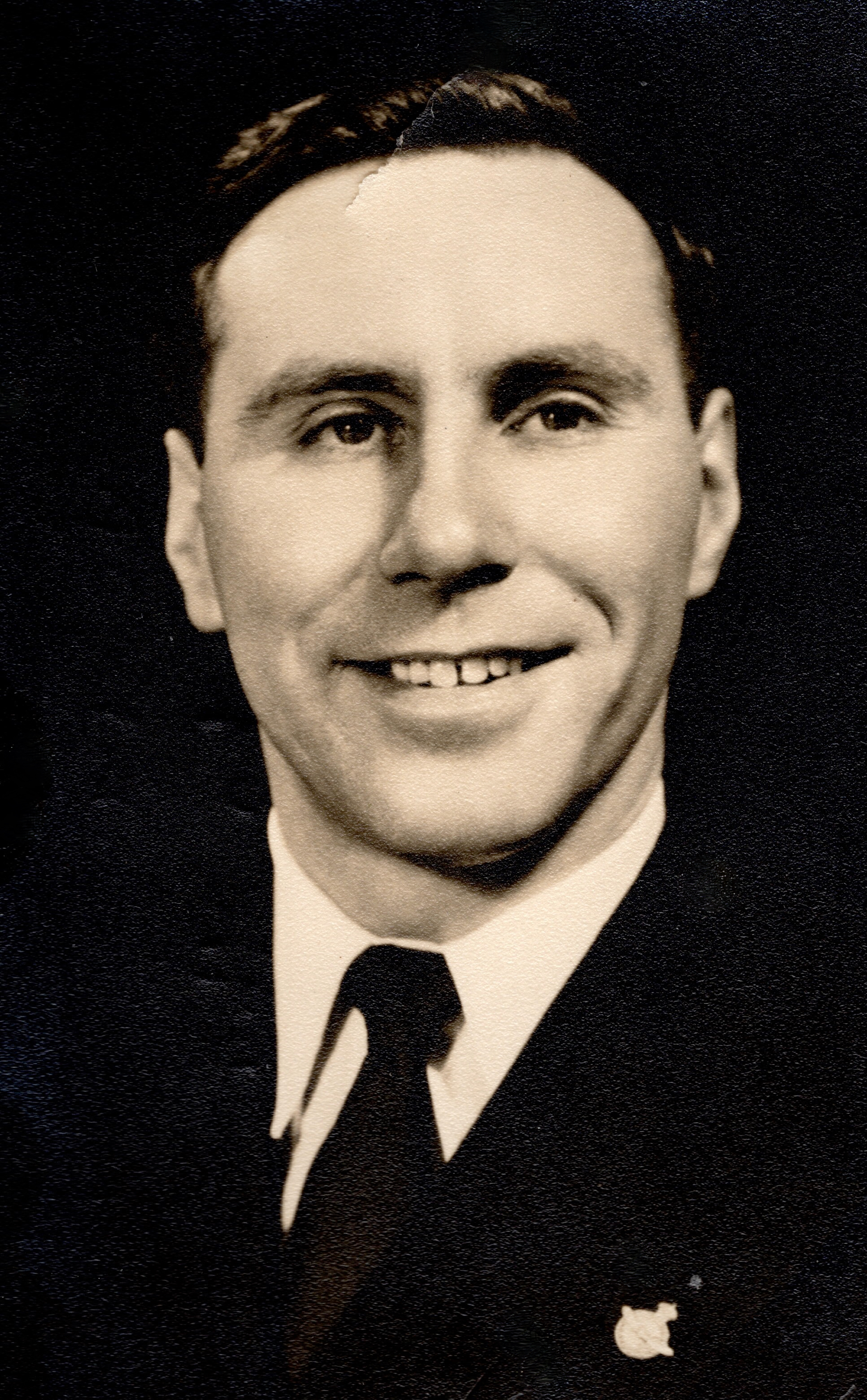

MLA for Peace River
- In office 1945–1949

Personal details
- Born: September 28, 1913 Kamloops, British Columbia
- Died: September 14, 1992 (aged 78) White Rock, British Columbia
- Party: Co-operative Commonwealth Federation
- Spouse: Margaret Carr

Joseph Hardcastle-Cumberland Corsbie (September 28, 1913 – September 14, 1992) was an accountant and political figure in British Columbia. He represented Peace River in the Legislative Assembly of British Columbia from 1945 to 1949 as a Co-operative Commonwealth Federation (CCF) member.

He was born in Kamloops, British Columbia and was educated in Saskatchewan. He served as a flying officer during World War II. Corsbie was an unsuccessful candidate for a seat in the assembly in 1941. He was defeated when he ran for reelection in 1949. Corsbie then became general manager for C.U. & C. Health Services in the lower mainland of British Columbia. He also served as president of the B.C. Credit Union League and of the B.C. Co-op Association and served two years as president of the provincial CCF. He was elected to the Burnaby municipal council in 1964. In 1966, he ran unsuccessfully in the provincial riding of Vancouver-Little Mountain. He died of pancreatic cancer in 1992 at age 78.

== Election results (partial) ==
1941 British Columbia general election: Peace River
Party	Candidate	Votes	%
Liberal	Glen Everton Braden	1,436	51.16
Co-operative Commonwealth	Joseph Hardcastle Corsbie	983	35.02
Independent Farmer	Thomas Jamieson	388	13.82
Total valid votes		2,807	100.00
Total rejected ballots		22	
