= Albert Planta =

Canadian politician (1868–1952)

The Honourable Albert Planta

Member of Parliament for Nanaimo
- In office 26 June 1917 – 11 December 1935

Personal details
- Born: 11 September 1868 Australia
- Died: 19 June 1952 (aged 83)
- Party: Conservative
- Children: Clive Planta
- Criminal information
- Occupation: Politician
- Status: Dead
- Criminal charge: Fraud
- Penalty: Two years imprionsment

Albert E. Planta (11 September 1868 – 19 June 1952) was a Canadian Senator and financial agent. He resigned from the Senate 11 December 1935 after being sentenced to two years imprisonment for fraud after he used $700 of a client's funds for personal use instead of his client's mortgage.

== Background ==
His son, Clive Planta, was a member of the British Columbia Legislative Assembly at the time of the elder Planta's conviction.

Planta was born in Australia and moved to British Columbia. On June 3, 1890, he married Amy Gordon in Nanaimo, BC. He served as mayor of Nanaimo, British Columbia for eight terms (1905-1908; 1910, 1911, 1914 and 1915), after having served eight terms as a Nanaimo city councillor. His public service included chair of the Nanaimo School Board and BC School Trustees Association. He was an unsuccessful candidate for the provincial legislature before being appointed to the Senate by Sir Robert Borden on 26 June 1917. He sat in the Upper House as a Conservative until his resignation. Planta Park in Nanaimo is named after Albert Planta.
