= William James Johnson (Canadian politician) =

Canadian politician (1881–1949)

Member of the Legislative Assembly of British Columbia
- In office 1945–1949
- Preceded by: Vincent Segur
- Succeeded by: Arvid Lundell
- Constituency: Revelstoke

Personal details
- Born: November 18, 1881 Blyth, Ontario
- Died: April 16, 1949 (aged 67) Revelstoke, British Columbia
- Party: Coalition
- Spouse: Myrtle May Perrin
- Children: 1
- Occupation: C.P.R. Locomotive Engineer

William James Johnson (November 18, 1881 – April 16, 1949) was a Canadian politician. After being an unsuccessful candidate in the 1941 provincial election for the Conservative Party, he served in the Legislative Assembly of British Columbia from 1945 to 1949, from the electoral district of Revelstoke, a member of the Coalition government.
