= George Henry Tomlinson Jr. =

Canadian politician

MLA for North Vancouver
- In office 1953–1956

Personal details
- Born: July 28, 1896 Yorkshire, England
- Died: May 21, 1963 (aged 66) Spuzzum, British Columbia
- Party: Social Credit
- Spouse: Edith
- Children: 8
- Education: University of Sheffield
- Occupation: businessman

George Henry Tomlinson Jr. (July 28, 1896 – May 21, 1963) was a Canadian politician. After an unsuccessful run in the 1952 provincial election, he served in the Legislative Assembly of British Columbia from 1953 to 1956 from the electoral district of North Vancouver, a member of the Social Credit Party. He was defeated when he sought reelection in 1956 as an independent candidate.
