= James Allan Reid =

Canadian politician

MLA for Salmon Arm
- In office 1952–1960

Personal details
- Born: May 8, 1897 Ballincollig, County Cork, Ireland
- Died: March 2, 1978 (aged 80) Salmon Arm, British Columbia
- Party: Social Credit
- Spouse: Annie Dutnall =Cora Gilbertson
- Children: Laura Charlotte, Robert, Don
- Occupation: Farming and Sawmill operator
- Profession: Baptist Pastor

James Allan Reid (May 8, 1897 – March 2, 1978) was a Canadian politician. After an unsuccessful bid in a 1945 byelection in the electoral district of North Okanagan, he served in the Legislative Assembly of British Columbia from 1952 to 1960 from the electoral district of Salmon Arm, a member of the Social Credit Party.
