= John Henry Cates =

Canadian politician (1896–1986)

John H. Cates

Member of the Legislative Assembly of British Columbia
- In office 1945–1952
- Constituency: North Vancouver

Personal details
- Born: July 13, 1896 Moodyville, British Columbia
- Died: October 26, 1986 (aged 90) North Vancouver, British Columbia
- Party: British Columbia Liberal Party
- Spouse: Carrie Matilda Sweeten

John Henry Cates (July 13, 1896 – October 26, 1986) was a businessman and political figure in British Columbia. He represented North Vancouver in the Legislative Assembly of British Columbia from 1945 to 1952 as a Liberal.

He was born in Moodyville, the son of Charles Henry Cates. Cates was a partner in the tugboat company C.H. Cates and Sons. He served in the Royal Navy during World War I. Cates was a member of a Liberal-Conservative coalition in the assembly and served as Minister of Labour and as Minister of Mines in the provincial cabinet. In 1927, he married Carrie Matilda Sweeten, who later served as mayor of North Vancouver; she died in 1977. Cates died at the age of 90 in 1986.
