= Duff Pattullo =

22nd Premier of British Columbia

Thomas Dufferin Pattullo

22nd Premier of British Columbia
- In office November 15, 1933 – December 9, 1941
- Monarchs: George V Edward VIII; George VI
- Lieutenant Governor: John W. F. Johnson; Eric Hamber; William C. Woodward
- Preceded by: Simon Fraser Tolmie
- Succeeded by: John Hart

Personal details
- Born: January 19, 1873 Woodstock, Ontario, Canada
- Died: March 30, 1956 (aged 83) Victoria, British Columbia, Canada
- Party: Liberal
- Spouse: Lillian Reidemeister
- Children: Lillian Doris Pattullo
- Education: University of Toronto

Thomas Dufferin "Duff" Pattullo (January 19, 1873 – March 30, 1956) was a Canadian politician who served as the 22nd Premier of British Columbia from 1933 to 1941. A member of the British Columbia Liberal Party, he led the province's response to the Great Depression with an ambitious program of public works, minimum wage increases, and social spending that historians have called the "Little New Deal," the most vigorous provincial response to the Depression anywhere in Canada.

Born in Woodstock, Ontario, to a prominent Liberal political family, Pattullo worked as a journalist before travelling to the Klondike in 1897 as secretary to the Yukon Commissioner. He spent a decade in the Yukon, where he served as acting Gold Commissioner and was elected to the Dawson City council. He moved to Prince Rupert in 1908, served as mayor, and entered provincial politics in 1916 as Minister of Lands. After becoming Liberal leader in 1928, he led the party to a landslide victory in the 1933 election.

As premier, Pattullo clashed repeatedly with the federal governments of R. B. Bennett and William Lyon Mackenzie King over economic policy and provincial autonomy. He rejected the centralizing recommendations of the Rowell-Sirois Commission in 1941, and his handling of Bloody Sunday (1938) damaged his support among organized labour. After the 1941 election returned a minority government, his caucus overruled his refusal to form a coalition with the Conservatives, and he resigned as leader and premier. Historian Robin Fisher has argued that Pattullo was the most significant British Columbia premier of the twentieth century.

== Early life and family ==
Pattullo was born on January 19, 1873, in Woodstock, Ontario, to George Robson Pattullo (1845–1922) and Mary Ann "Minnie" Rounds. His family was of Scottish descent, tracing back to his grandfather Halkett Pattullo (1809–c. 1855), who emigrated from Midlothian, Scotland, to Upper Canada.

The Pattullos were deeply embedded in Ontario Liberal politics. Pattullo's father ran the Woodstock Sentinel newspaper, served as chief Liberal organizer for Ontario from 1880, and held the position of Registrar of Deeds for Oxford County from 1886 until his death in 1922. His uncle, Andrew Pattulo (1850–1903), built the Woodstock Sentinel-Review into one of the most respected newspapers west of Toronto, served as MPP for Oxford North, and was the first president of the Ontario Good Roads Association.

Pattullo's siblings were also accomplished. His brother James Burleigh Pattullo studied law at Osgoode Hall Law School, practised in the Yukon as a Crown prosecutor and King's Counsel, then became a prominent Vancouver barrister and served as paymaster of the 72nd Seaforth Highlanders in the First World War. His brother George Pattullo became an internationally known journalist and fiction writer for the Saturday Evening Post, was the first to report the wartime heroism of Sergeant Alvin York, and married into a Dallas business family.

Pattullo attended the University of Toronto and worked briefly as a bank clerk before entering journalism. He worked at the Woodstock Sentinel and later edited the Galt Reformer.

== Yukon years (1897–1908) ==
=== The Chilkoot crossing ===
In September 1897, Pattullo joined a government party of fifty officials travelling to the Yukon as secretary to Major James Morrow Walsh, the newly appointed Commissioner of the Yukon Territory. The appointment came through his family's Liberal patronage connections, particularly the influence of Sir Richard Cartwright. Pattullo supplemented his government salary by reporting on the gold rush for the Montreal Herald.

The party sailed on the steamship Quadra up the Inside Passage to Skagway and began climbing the Chilkoot Pass in late October amid bitter winds and freezing rain. In early November, they attempted to sail down Lake Bennett, a dangerous undertaking at that time of year. When the river iced over and capsized their vessel, Pattullo made it to shore, but one member of the party, J. J. Freeman, disappeared under the ice and drowned. The group spent the winter at Big Salmon, a First Nations village roughly halfway between present-day Whitehorse and Dawson City, before reaching Dawson in May 1898.

=== Dawson City ===
In Dawson, Pattullo served in the territorial administration, eventually becoming acting assistant Gold Commissioner. He worked to clean up the Mining Recorder's office, which had been tarnished by corruption, and received praise even from the hostile press for his effectiveness. He was one of the few officials not publicly criticized during subsequent corruption investigations.

Pattullo's early years in Dawson were not without controversy. The new Commissioner, William Ogilvie, took a strong dislike to him because of his association with Walsh, whose personal conduct in Dawson had been notoriously indiscreet. Ogilvie described Pattullo's "drinking and rebellious spirit" in private letters to Interior Minister Sifton and attempted to have him reassigned to a remote posting at Fort Selkirk. Pattullo's supporters in Ottawa overruled Ogilvie. Sifton later acknowledged privately that while Pattullo had been "a very exemplary official," early "irregularities in his personal habits" had created difficulties.

In 1903, Pattullo managed the Yukon Sun, Dawson's Liberal newspaper, personally borrowing $3,000 to keep it in operation. He was elected to the Dawson City council in January 1904 and chaired the fire, water, and light committee. He also served as honorary consul for the United Kingdoms of Norway and Sweden, a position reflecting his civic prominence and the significant Scandinavian population among Klondike miners.

A factional war with Commissioner Frederick Tennyson Congdon dominated Pattullo's later years in Dawson. Pattullo wrote to Sifton and Prime Minister Laurier describing Congdon as "unreliable, unpolitical, weak and wholly lacking in ordinary judgment." Congdon engineered a plebiscite to revoke the Dawson city charter, dissolving the council after eight months. In the December 1904 federal election, Pattullo's Liberal faction allied with Conservatives to defeat Congdon's candidate. Guest argues that the Yukon years taught Pattullo a lasting distrust of distant federal authority and a pragmatic, combative political style that would define his career.

== Rise in British Columbia (1908–1933) ==
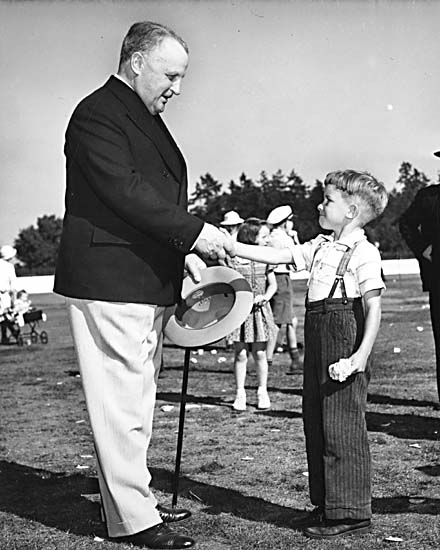
Pattullo in the 1920s during his tenure as a provincial politician

Pattullo moved to Prince Rupert in 1908, hoping to benefit from the arrival of the Grand Trunk Pacific Railway. His business ventures in real estate and construction did not prosper, but his political career advanced quickly. He was elected to Prince Rupert's first city council in 1910 and served a term as mayor.

In the 1916 election, Pattullo won the newly created riding of Prince Rupert for the provincial legislature, a seat he would hold for 29 years. He was immediately appointed Minister of Lands in the Liberal government, responsible for overseeing the province's forestry industry. He married Lillian Reidemeister; they had one daughter, Lillian Doris (later Collison, 1905–1989).

After the Liberals lost the 1928 election, Pattullo was chosen as party leader. As Leader of the Opposition during the worsening Depression, he revitalized the party and developed the activist economic platform that he would implement as premier.

== Premier of British Columbia (1933–1941) ==
=== Election ===
In the 1933 British Columbia general election, Pattullo led the Liberals to a commanding victory over the Co-operative Commonwealth Federation (CCF) and a Conservative Party in complete collapse, which did not field official candidates. He became premier on November 15, 1933, at the depth of the Depression.

=== The "Little New Deal" ===
Pattullo's economic program, which he described as "socialized capitalism," aimed to use state power to reform and stabilize the capitalist system rather than replace it. Historians have noted that this was essentially a Keynesian approach implemented before John Maynard Keynes had fully articulated his theory.

The centerpiece legislation was the 1934 Special Powers Act, which gave the government broad authority to act on economic and social matters. Under this authority, the Pattullo government raised the minimum wage, launched public works projects to create employment (including roads, bridges, and the Pattullo Bridge, opened 1937), increased funding for schools and for relief of the poor and unemployed, advanced proposals for health insurance, and created the Department of Trade and Industry in 1937 to coordinate economic planning.

The "Little New Deal" represented the most vigorous provincial response to the Depression anywhere in Canada. The federal government under both R. B. Bennett and Mackenzie King took a more cautious approach. Bennett's own "New Deal" legislation was struck down by the Judicial Committee of the Privy Council as ultra vires, since the matters it addressed fell within provincial jurisdiction. King was a fiscal conservative who favoured retrenchment. Both prime ministers resisted Pattullo's persistent requests for increased federal economic assistance to British Columbia, and both privately referred to him as a dictator.

Pattullo was re-elected in the 1937 election, campaigning on the slogan of "socialized capitalism."

=== Views on Asian Canadians ===
Like the overwhelming majority of British Columbia politicians across all parties during this era, Pattullo opposed the extension of the franchise to Chinese Canadians, Japanese Canadians, and Indo-Canadians. British Columbia had disenfranchised Chinese voters in 1872, Japanese voters in 1895, and South Asian voters in 1907, decades before Pattullo entered provincial politics.

Pattullo told the Rowell-Sirois Commission that "Oriental immigration into Canada should be prohibited upon grounds of ethnological differences of race." He argued that British Columbia could not tolerate extending the vote to Asian Canadians who had served in the military, and he drafted a resolution for the 1938 Liberal convention calling for exclusion and repatriation.

Roy's scholarship demonstrates that these views reflected a near-universal consensus in British Columbia politics. In 1922, all thirteen of the province's federal MPs, Liberal and Conservative alike, spoke in support of a motion calling for the exclusion of "oriental aliens." The only substantive debate among British Columbia politicians concerned strategy: whether to pressure Ottawa through confrontational legislation or through private persuasion. Pattullo, who preferred to work behind the scenes with Mackenzie King rather than embarrass the federal Liberal party publicly, was a more moderate voice than figures such as Captain MacGregor Macintosh or A. W. Neill, who pushed more aggressively for exclusion legislation.

=== Rowell-Sirois Commission ===
The Depression exposed a structural problem in Canadian federalism. The provinces held constitutional responsibility for health care, education, and social welfare, but the federal government controlled the major revenue sources. By the late 1930s, several provinces were approaching insolvency from the cost of unemployment relief.

In 1937, the federal government appointed the Royal Commission on Dominion-Provincial Relations (the Rowell-Sirois Commission). Reporting in 1940, it recommended that the provinces surrender personal and corporate income tax and succession duties to the federal government, which would in return assume responsibility for unemployment insurance and contributory pensions, take on provincial debts, and create "National Adjustment Grants" to equalize revenues across provinces.

Pattullo regarded this as a poor bargain for British Columbia, a wealthier province that would surrender its taxing power and receive less in return than it contributed, owing to the equalization mechanism that would redirect revenues to poorer provinces. At the January 1941 federal-provincial conference, Pattullo joined with Ontario's Mitchell Hepburn and Alberta's William Aberhart in refusing to accept the report. Critics labelled the three premiers "saboteurs," though Fisher's biography argues that this characterization reflected an eastern Canadian centralist perspective that misunderstood western concerns about provincial autonomy.

Pattullo's opposition was rooted not in hostility to government activism but in his belief that provinces needed more fiscal capacity, not less. He advocated for increased federal transfers without the centralization of taxing power, and he championed construction of the Alaska Highway and the annexation of the Yukon Territory to British Columbia as means of reducing eastern Canada's economic dominance over the west.

=== 1938 sit-down strike ===
In April 1938, Pattullo cancelled provincially operated relief projects after the federal government under Mackenzie King cut its share of the funding. This threw large numbers of unemployed men onto the streets of Vancouver.

On May 20, 1938, approximately 1,200 unemployed men, organized by the Relief Project Workers' Union under activist Steve Brodie, simultaneously occupied three buildings in Vancouver: the Hotel Georgia, the Vancouver Art Gallery (then on Georgia Street), and the main post office on Hastings Street. The hotel occupation ended quickly when staff paid the demonstrators to leave, but the art gallery and post office occupations lasted a full month.

On the morning of June 19, 1938, the RCMP moved to clear the buildings. At the art gallery, CCF politician Harold Winch negotiated a peaceful withdrawal. At the post office, the RCMP used tear gas and batons. The violence spilled onto the surrounding streets, with approximately 100 people injured, 43 seriously enough for hospitalization. An estimated 10,000 to 15,000 people attended a protest rally that afternoon.

Pattullo's response alienated much of his support in metropolitan areas. He told delegations that the unemployed had been shown "too much sympathy" and refused to authorize emergency relief projects or a special session of the legislature. He then used the incident as evidence that the federal government needed to restore relief funding to the provinces, but King maintained that relief was a provincial responsibility.

=== Coalition crisis and resignation ===
The 1941 British Columbia general election returned the Liberals with only a minority of seats, owing in part to the rising strength of the CCF. Pattullo's caucus urged him to form a coalition government with the Conservatives. He refused, warning that if the Liberals entered coalition, the party "will start downhill, and never again within a generation will it be the power it has been in British Columbia."

His caucus overruled him, voting in favour of coalition. Pattullo resigned as party leader and premier in December 1941. His prediction proved remarkably accurate: the Liberal-Conservative coalition governed for over a decade, and its acrimonious breakup before the 1952 election facilitated the rise of the Social Credit Party and the decline of the Liberals as a major force in British Columbia politics for a generation.

== Later life ==
In the 1945 election, Pattullo ran as an independent Liberal in his former riding of Prince Rupert and lost. He retired to Victoria, where he died on March 30, 1956, aged 83. He is interred at Royal Oak Burial Park.

== Legacy ==
Fisher's biography argues that Pattullo was the most important British Columbia premier of the twentieth century, offering the country's most ambitious provincial response to the Depression and posing a fundamental challenge to the centralist model of Canadian federalism. Ormsby's earlier study placed Pattullo's program alongside Roosevelt's New Deal as a serious, if ultimately frustrated, attempt at interventionist economic policy at the sub-national level.

Several geographic features bear Pattullo's name, including the Pattullo Bridge (opened November 15, 1937; closed February 6, 2026, and replaced by the stal̕əw̓asəm Bridge), the Pattullo Range, Mount Pattullo, the Pattullo Glaciers, and Pattullo Park in Prince Rupert.

Political offices
Preceded by Simon Fraser Tolmie	Premier of British Columbia; 1933–1941	Succeeded by John Hart
