= Arvid Lundell =

Canadian politician (1899–1984)

Member of the Legislative Assembly of British Columbia
- In office 1949–1952
- Preceded by: William James Johnson
- Succeeded by: Vincent Segur
- Constituency: Revelstoke
- In office 1949–1952
- Preceded by: Vincent Segur
- Succeeded by: George Hobbs
- Constituency: Revelstoke

Personal details
- Born: Arvid Waldemar Lundell; September 6, 1899 Revelstoke, British Columbia
- Died: May 6, 1984 (aged 84) Revelstoke, British Columbia
- Party: Coalition/Conservative/Social Credit
- Spouse(s): Isabel Dunlop; Janet McTaggart
- Occupation: newspaper owner and editor

Arvid Waldemar Lundell (September 6, 1899 – May 6, 1984) was a newspaper owner and political figure in British Columbia. He represented Revelstoke in the Legislative Assembly of British Columbia from 1949 to 1952 as a Conservative member of the Coalition Government, and from 1956 to 1960 and from 1963 to 1966 as a Social Credit member.

He was born in Revelstoke, British Columbia in 1889, the son of Frederick Lundell and Kerstin Cederholm, both natives of Sweden. Lundell was married twice: first to Isabel Dunlop in 1922 and then to Janet McTaggart in 1934. He was the publisher of the Revelstoke Review: As a newsboy, he had delivered the first issue and then, later, he became its owner. Lundell also served as an alderman for Revelstoke and was mayor of Revelstoke from 1962 to 1969. He was defeated when he ran for reelection in 1952, 1953, 1960, and a 1962 byelection. Lundell was also president of the Canadian Weekly Newspapers Association. He died in Revelstoke at the age of 84.
