= Similkameen (electoral district) =

Defunct provincial electoral district in British Columbia, Canada

British Columbia electoral district

Defunct provincial electoral district
- Legislature: Legislative Assembly of British Columbia
- First contested: 1903
- Last contested: 1963

Similkameen was the name of a provincial electoral district of British Columbia, Canada, formed around the historic mining district of the same name. It made its first appearance on the hustings in the election of 1903. After the 1963 election, which was the occasion of this riding's last appearance, this electoral district was combined with Grand Forks-Greenwood to form Boundary-Similkameen for the 1966 election.

== Notable MLAs ==
- Lytton Wilmot Shatford (Conservative, 1903–1917)
- William Alexander McKenzie (Conservative, 1918–1933)
- Charles Herbert Percy Tupper (Liberal, 1933–1941)
- Frank Richter, Jr. (Social Credit, 1953–1966)

== Electoral history ==
Note: Winners of each election are in bold.

10th British Columbia election, 1903
Party	Candidate	Votes	%	±	Expenditures
Conservative	Lytton Wilmot Shatford	**299**	**58.28%**		unknown
Liberal	William Alexander McLean	214	41.72%		unknown
Total valid votes		513	100.00%		
Total rejected ballots					
Turnout		%			

11th British Columbia election, 1907
Party	Candidate	Votes	%	±	Expenditures
Conservative	**Lytton Wilmot Shatford**	**298**	**56.55%**		unknown
Liberal	Curtis Smith	200	37.95%		unknown
Socialist	George Edgar Winkler	29	5.50%	–	unknown
Total valid votes		527	100.00%		
Total rejected ballots					
Turnout		%			

12th British Columbia election, 1909
Party	Candidate	Votes	%	±	Expenditures
Conservative	**Lytton Wilmot Shatford**	**440**	**68.22%**		unknown
Liberal	Richard Elmhirst	205	31.78%		unknown
Total valid votes		645	100.00%		
Total rejected ballots					
Turnout		%			
^{1} Also spelled Elmhurst.

13th British Columbia election, 1912
Party	Candidate	Votes	%	±	Expenditures
Conservative	**Lytton Wilmot Shatford**	**Acclaimed**	-.-%		unknown
Total valid votes		n/a	100.00%		
Total rejected ballots					
Turnout		%			

14th British Columbia election, 1916
Party	Candidate	Votes	%	±	Expenditures
Conservative	**Lytton Wilmot Shatford**	**650**	**55.41%**		unknown
Liberal	Robert Scott Conklin	523	44.59%		unknown
Total valid votes		1,173	100.00%		
Total rejected ballots					
Turnout		%			

15th British Columbia election, 1920
Party	Candidate	Votes	%	±	Expenditures
Conservative	**William Alexander McKenzie**	**1,354**	**51.72%**		unknown
Liberal	Edward John Chambers	1,264	48.28%		unknown
Total valid votes		2,618	100.00%		
Total rejected ballots					
Turnout		%			

16th British Columbia election, 1924
Party	Candidate	Votes	%	±	Expenditures
Conservative	**William Alexander McKenzie**	**1,306**	**39.56%**		unknown
Provincial	Percy Walter Gregory	1,224	37.08%	–	unknown
Liberal	Zella May McGregor	771	23.36%		unknown
Total valid votes		3,301	100.00%		
Total rejected ballots					
Turnout		%			

17th British Columbia election, 1928
Party	Candidate	Votes	%	±	Expenditures
Conservative	William Alexander McKenzie	**2,079**	**55.53%**		unknown
Liberal	Charles Herbert Percy Tupper ^{2}	1,665	44.47%		unknown
Total valid votes		3,744	100.00%		
Total rejected ballots		63			
Turnout		%			
^{2} Not to be confused with Canadian prime minister Sir Charles Tupper or his son, Sir Charles Hibbert Tupper.

18th British Columbia election, 1933
Party	Candidate	Votes	%	±	Expenditures
**Liberal**	**Charles Herbert Percy Tupper**	**1,765**	**43.23%**		unknown
Non-Partisan Independent Group	William Alexander McKenzie	1,386	33.95%	–	unknown
Co-operative Commonwealth Fed.	Francis Henry (Frank) Brown	730	17.88%		unknown
Independent	Thomas Heeney	202	4.95%		unknown
Total valid votes		4,083	100.00%		
Total rejected ballots		81			
Turnout		%			

18th British Columbia election, 1937
Party	Candidate	Votes	%	±	Expenditures
**Liberal**	**Charles Herbert Percy Tupper**	**2,266**	**43.55%**		unknown
Conservative	Harry Howes Boyle	2,130	40.94%		unknown
Co-operative Commonwealth Fed.	Francis Henry (Frank) Brown	807	15.51%		unknown
Total valid votes		5,203	100.00%		
Total rejected ballots		71			
Turnout		%			

19th British Columbia election, 1941
Party	Candidate	Votes	%	±	Expenditures
**Co-operative Commonwealth Fed.**	**Bernard George Webber**	**2,601**	**41.16%**		unknown
Liberal	Charles Herbert Percy Tupper	1,965	31.10%		unknown
Conservative	Thomas F. Daly	1,753	27.74%		unknown
Total valid votes		6,319	100.00%		
Total rejected ballots		118			
Turnout		%			

19th British Columbia election, 1945
Party	Candidate	Votes	%	±	Expenditures
Coalition	**Reginald Robert Laird**	**3,447**	**57.09%**	–	unknown
Co-operative Commonwealth Fed.	Bernard George Webber	2,591	42.91%		unknown
Total valid votes		6,038	100.00%		
Total rejected ballots		53			
Turnout		%			

20th British Columbia election, 1949
Party	Candidate	Votes	%	±	Expenditures
Coalition	**Maurice Patrick Finnerty**	**5,744**	**58.78%**	–	unknown
Co-operative Commonwealth Fed.	Bernard George Webber	4,028	41.22%		unknown
Total valid votes		9,772	100.00%		
Total rejected ballots		284			
Turnout		%			

21st British Columbia election, 1952 ^{3}
Party	Candidate	Votes 1st count	%	Votes final count	%	±%	
Co-operative Commonwealth Fed.	Harold Sidney Kenyon	3,433	32.02%	4,668	49.77%		unknown
**B.C. Social Credit League**	**Harry Denyer Francis**	**3,344**	**31.19%**	**4,712**	**50.23%**		unknown
Liberal	Maurice Patrick Finnerty	2,545	23.73%	-	-.- %		unknown
Progressive Conservative	Edward Titchmarsh	1401	13.07%	-	-.- %		unknown
Total valid votes		10,723	100.00%	9,380			
Total rejected ballots		296					
Turnout		%					
^{3} Preferential ballot. First and final of three counts only shown.

British Columbia provincial by-election, November 24, 1952 Resignation of Harry Denyer Francis
Party	Candidate	Votes	%
Social Credit	Einar Maynard Gunderson	5,556	59.74
Co-operative Commonwealth	Harold Sidney Kenyon	3,605	38.76
Independent Farm Labour	Joseph Klein	140	1.51
Total valid votes		9,301	
Total rejected ballots		183	
Source: Elections BC

22nd British Columbia election, 1953 ^{4}
Party	Candidate	Votes 1st count	%	Votes final count	%	±%	
Social Credit	**Frank Richter, Jr.**	**4,465**	**43.29%**	**5,418**	**56.89%**		
Co-operative Commonwealth Fed.	Harold Sidney Kenyon	3,419	33.14%	4,105	43.11%		unknown
Liberal	James Bowie Fairley	2,109	20.44%	-	-.- %		unknown
Progressive Conservative	John Brown McLaren Clarke	323	3.13%	-	-.- %		unknown
Total valid votes		10,316	100.00%	9,523			
Total rejected ballots		347					
Turnout		%					
^{4} Preferential ballot. First and second of three counts only shown.

23rd British Columbia election, 1956
Party	Candidate	Votes	%	±	Expenditures
Social Credit	**Frank Richter, Jr.**	**5,189**	**53.94%**	–	unknown
Liberal	Frank William Laird	1,181	37.94%		unknown
Co-operative Commonwealth Fed.	Stephen Archibald Mepham	2,200	22.87%		unknown
Progressive Conservative	James Douglas Southworth	487	5.06%		unknown
Total valid votes		9,620	100.00%		
Total rejected ballots		90			
Turnout		%			

24th British Columbia election, 1960
Party	Candidate	Votes	%	±	Expenditures
Social Credit	**Frank Richter, Jr.**	**4,797**	**46.84%**	–	unknown
CCF	Francis Douglas Stuart	3,151	30.77%		unknown
Liberal	Johannes Joseph Winkelaar	1,454	14.20%		unknown
Progressive Conservative	Winnifred Odetta Mathias	840	8.20%		unknown
Total valid votes		10,242	100.00%		
Total rejected ballots		75			
Turnout		%			

25th British Columbia election, 1963
Party	Candidate	Votes	%	±	Expenditures
Social Credit	**Frank Richter, Jr.**	**5,093**	**48.71%**	–	unknown
New Democratic	Francis Douglas Stuart	2,636	25.21%		unknown
Liberal	Alwyn Day Coleman Washington	1,423	13.61%		unknown
Progressive Conservative	Evelyn Annie McElroy	1,303	12.46%		unknown
Total valid votes		10,455	100.00%		
Total rejected ballots		86			
Turnout		%			

The riding was redistributed following the 1963 election. The main successor riding was Boundary-Similkameen.

== See also ==
- List of British Columbia provincial electoral districts
- Canadian provincial electoral districts
