= Lytton Shatford =

Canadian politician (1873–1920)

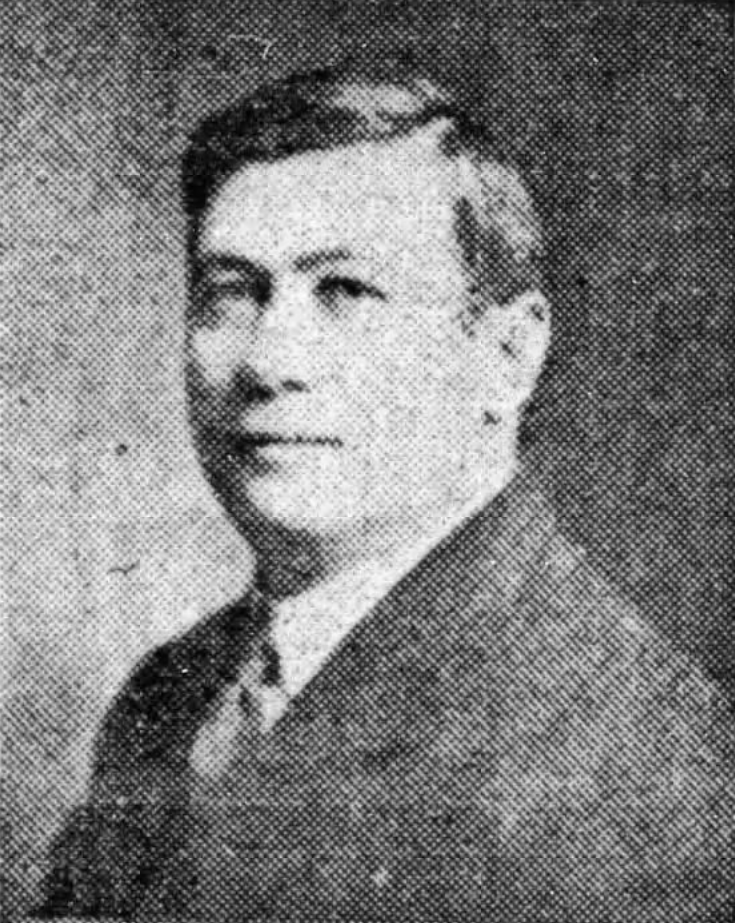

Canadian Senator from British Columbia
- In office 1917 – November 8, 1920
- Prime Minister: Robert Borden

Member of the Legislative Assembly of British Columbia for Similkameen
- In office 1903–1917

Personal details
- Born: Lytton Wilmot Shatford; February 4, 1873 Hubbards, Nova Scotia, Canada
- Died: November 8, 1920 (aged 47) Vancouver, British Columbia, Canada
- Party: Conservative
- Occupation: Businessman; politician

Lytton Wilmot Shatford (February 4, 1873 - November 8, 1920) was a politician and businessman in British Columbia, Canada.

== Biography ==
Born in Hubbards, Nova Scotia, he moved west during one of the British Columbia gold rushes where he and his brother, Walter Tyrrel Shatford, ran a general store in the gold mining town of Fairview near what is now Oliver. They also owned the Shatford Mercantile Store in Hedley which was one of the town's first permanent structures.

In 1905, the brothers established the Southern Okanagan Land Company. They proceeded to purchase and subdivide land north of the Canada/US border and installed in irrigation system in the area of Vaseux Lake. In 1918, they sold 22,000 acres (89 km^{2}) to the government of British Columbia for $300,000 in order to settle demobilized Canadian soldiers following World War I.

Shatford was elected to the British Columbia Legislative Assembly in the 1903 provincial election as a Conservative representing the riding of Similkameen. He remained in the legislature until 1917 when he was appointed to the Senate of Canada by Prime Minister Sir Robert Borden. He died in office at Vancouver General Hospital from a stroke on November 8, 1920.

He was the second president of the BC and Yukon Chamber of Mines, founded in 1912. The first president was Robert Hedley. Shatford was elected at the organization's first annual general meeting in 1913.

The Shatford School, now part of Penticton Secondary School in Penticton, British Columbia was named in his honour.
