= Vincent Segur =

Canadian politician

Member of the Legislative Assembly of British Columbia
- In office 1943–1945
- Preceded by: Harry Johnston
- Succeeded by: William James Johnson
- Constituency: Revelstoke
- In office 1952–1956
- Preceded by: Arvid Lundell
- Succeeded by: Arvid Lundell
- Constituency: Revelstoke

Personal details
- Born: May 2, 1887 Danbury, Iowa, U.S.
- Died: February 25, 1965 (aged 77) Burnaby, British Columbia
- Party: CCF
- Occupation: fireman and train engineer

Vincent Spies Segur (May 2, 1887 – February 25, 1965) was an American-born locomotive engineer and political figure in British Columbia. He represented Revelstoke in the Legislative Assembly of British Columbia from 1943 to 1945 and from 1952 to 1956 as a Co-operative Commonwealth Federation (CCF) member.

He was born in Danbury, Iowa and came to Lacombe, Alberta with his family while still young. In 1908, he was working in lumber camps on Vancouver Island and, the following year, joined the Canadian Pacific Railway, where he worked as a fireman and train engineer stationed in Revelstoke. Segur ran unsuccessfully for a seat in the provincial assembly in 1933. He was first elected to the assembly in a 1943 by-election held following the death of Harry Johnston but he was defeated when he ran for reelection in 1945 and 1949. He retired from the railway in 1952 and was again elected to the assembly later that year. Segur retired from politics in 1956 and moved to Vernon. He died in Burnaby of a heart attack at the age of 77.
