= British Columbia Social Constructive Party =

Provincial political party in Canada (1936–1937)

The British Columbia Social Constructive Party (also known as the Social Constructives and the BC Reconstructive Party) was formed in 1936 by a breakaway from the British Columbia Co-operative Commonwealth Federation after Robert Connell was expelled from the party over doctrinal differences. Connell had been leader of the CCF until his expulsion. Three other MLAs of the seven-person CCF caucus, Jack Price, R. B. Swailes, and Ernest Bakewell, left the party and joined Connell to form the Social Constructives. The four member caucus, having one more MLA than the CCF, was large enough to allow Connell to remain Leader of the Opposition in the British Columbia Legislative Assembly. Other defectors included Victor Midgely, former leader of the One Big Union, and Bill Pritchard, editor and owner of the BC CCF's newspaper, The Commonwealth. The party worked closely with Rolf Wallgren Bruhn an independent MLA who had formerly been a Conservative. Bruhn helped write the new party's platform and conducted a speaking tour with Connell during the 1937 general election but declined to join the party and stood for re-election as an independent though with the Constructives' endorsement.

Connell was expelled for publicly rejecting the party platform adopted by the BC CCF at its 1936 convention as too radical for calling for the socialization of banking and credit.

The new party ran on a moderate left of centre program standing between the governing Liberal Party of British Columbia and the CCF. The new party lacked the organizational strength of either the CCF or the Liberals and was unable to field candidates in even one-third of the province's electoral districts. The party also refused to hold nominating conventions for candidates in order to prevent groups from taking over the party. Instead, individuals were invited to stand as candidates and then appointed. In the context of the Great Depression, the party's platform of moderate reformism proved unable to distinguish itself from a Liberal Party that was leaning left and using the slogan of "socialized capitalism".

The "Social Constructives" stood 14 candidates (out of a possible 48) in the 1937 general election; they failed to win any seats. However, their endorsee Bruhn was re-elected as an Independent; Bruhn later rejoined the Conservatives. The Social Constructives received 8,086 votes to the CCF's 119,400. Disappointed with the results, Connell came to the conclusion that change was not possible through a third party but only through working within mainstream parties.

== See also ==
- League for Social Reconstruction
