= Ministry of Lands =

Ministry of Lands may refer to:

- Minister of Lands (New Zealand)
- Ministry of Tourism and Lands (Sri Lanka)
- Ministry of Lands and Natural Resources (Zambia)
