= North Vancouver (provincial electoral district) =

Defunct provincial electoral district in British Columbia, Canada

British Columbia electoral district

Defunct provincial electoral district
- Legislature: Legislative Assembly of British Columbia
- First contested: 1916
- Last contested: 1963

North Vancouver was a provincial electoral district in British Columbia, Canada. It first appeared on the hustings in 1916 and at the time of its creation included West Vancouver as well as North Vancouver. Prior to its creation, the North Shore had been part of the Vancouver riding.

The North Vancouver riding last appeared in the election of 1963, after which it was partitioned into North Vancouver-Capilano, North Vancouver-Seymour, and West Vancouver-Howe Sound. This area is represented today by North Vancouver-Seymour and North Vancouver-Lonsdale. The Lonsdale riding covers an area similar to North Vancouver-Capilano. West Vancouver-Howe Sound has become West Vancouver-Capilano and West Vancouver-Garibaldi. The latter includes areas formerly part of the old Lillooet riding West Vancouver-Capilano includes western areas of North Vancouver formerly part of North Vancouver-Capilano.

== Election results ==
14th British Columbia election, 1916
Party	Candidate	Votes	%	±	Expenditures
Liberal	George Samuel Hanes	980	52.80%		unknown
Conservative	George H. Morden	598	32.22%		unknown
Independent Conservative	William McNeish	278	14.98%		unknown
Total valid votes		1,856	100.00%		
Total rejected ballots					
Turnout		%			

15th British Columbia election, 1920
Party	Candidate	Votes	%	±	Expenditures
Independent	George Samuel Hanes ^{1}	2,681	54.68%		unknown
Conservative	Valient Vivian Vinson	1,180	24.07%		unknown
Liberal	Benjamin Chubb ^{2}	913	18.62%		unknown
Independents	James Orchard	129	2.63%		unknown
Total valid votes		4,903	100.00%		
Total rejected ballots					
Turnout		%			
^{1} Endorsed by North Vancouver City Liberal Association and by Great War Veterans Association.
^{2} Repudiated by North Vancouver City Liberal Association..

16th British Columbia election, 1924
Party	Candidate	Votes	%	±	Expenditures
Liberal	John Melvin Bryan Sr.	1,283	31.34%		
Independent Liberal	George Samuel Hanes	1,163	28.41%		
Provincial	Richard Francis Raleigh Cruise	1,151	28.11%		
Conservative	William Stearne Deacon	442	10.80%		
Independent	James Orchard	55	1.34%		
Total valid votes		4,094	100.00%		

17th British Columbia election, 1928
Party	Candidate	Votes	%	±	Expenditures
Liberal	Ian Alistair MacKenzie	2,498	46.60%		unknown
Conservative	Jack Loutet	2,466	46.00%		unknown
Independent	Archie Carland MacMillan	397	7.40%		unknown
Total valid votes		5,361	100.00%		
Total rejected ballots		118			
Turnout		%			

18th British Columbia election, 1933
Party	Candidate	Votes	%	±	Expenditures
Co-operative Commonwealth Fed.	Harley Christian Erskine Anderson	2,427	35.19%		
Non-Partisan Independent Group	Jack Loutet	1,784	25.87%		
Liberal	Herbert Spencer Wood	1,636	23.72%		
Independent Liberal	John Melvin Bryan Sr.	846	12.27%		
United Front (Workers and Farmers)	William Henry Morson	132	1.91%		
Labour (Party) ^{3}	Howard Edward Ryan	65	0.94%		
Independent	James Whitham	7	0.10%		
Total valid votes		6,897	100.00%		
Total rejected ballots		77			
^{3} Endorsed by the Independent CCF.

British Columbia provincial by-election, July 14, 1934 Death of Harley Anderson
Party	Candidate	Votes	%
Co-operative Commonwealth	Dorothy Gretchen Steeves	2,797	53.00
Liberal	Mackenzie M. Matheson	2,289	43.38
United Front (Workers and Farmers)	Eldred Ellis Leary	150	2.84
Independent Socialist	James Whitham	41	0.78
Total valid votes		5,277	
Source: Elections BC

19th British Columbia election, 1937
Party	Candidate	Votes	%	±	Expenditures
Co-operative Commonwealth Fed.	Dorothy Steeves	2,749	32.23%		unknown
Independent	Joseph Bentley Leyland	2,386	27.98%		unknown
Liberal	Edith Myrtle Turner	1,847	21.66%		unknown
Conservative	Jack Loutet	1,522	17.84%		unknown
Independent	James Whitham	25	0.29%		unknown
Total valid votes		8,529	100.00%		
Total rejected ballots		94			
Turnout		%			

20th British Columbia election, 1941
Party	Candidate	Votes	%	±	Expenditures
Co-operative Commonwealth Fed.	Dorothy Steeves	4,209	40.37%		unknown
Liberal	Francis Austin Walker	2,945	28.24%		unknown
Official Conservative ^{1}	Alfred Hugh Bayne	2,161	20.73%		unknown
Conservative	Joshua Hinchcliffe ^{1}	1,056	10.13%		unknown
Independent Socialist	James Whitham	56	0.54%		unknown
Total valid votes		10,427	100.00%		
Total rejected ballots		162			
Turnout		%			
^{1} J. Hinchliffe was nominated by the North Vancouver Conservative Association but when he disagreed with the party's road policy he was repudiated by the party leader, R.L. Maitland. A group called the Conservative Active Club nominated A. H. Bayne who was approved by Maitland. Bayne, however, could not run as a Conservative since Hinchliffe's nomination papers had been filed. Consequently, Hinchliffe's votes are included in the Conservative Party total and Bayne, who ran as an "Official Conservative", is listed separately.

21st British Columbia election, 1945
Party	Candidate	Votes	%	±	Expenditures
Coalition	John Henry Cates ^{1}	5,912	54.20%	–	unknown
Co-operative Commonwealth Fed.	Dorothy Steeves	4,070	37.31%		unknown
Communist	Austin "E" Delaney	646	5.92%		unknown
Social Credit Alliance	Stanley Earl Wilcox	280	2.57%		unknown
Independent Socialist	James Whitham	56	0.54%		unknown
Total valid votes		10,908	100.00%		
Total rejected ballots		205			
Turnout		%			
^{1} John Hendry Cates in List of Candidates.

22nd British Columbia election, 1949
Party	Candidate	Votes	%	±	Expenditures
Coalition	John Henry Cates	12,586	69.57%	–	unknown
Co-operative Commonwealth Fed.	Clifford Augustine Greer	5,504	30.43%		unknown
Total valid votes		18,090	100.00%		
Total rejected ballots		220			
Turnout					

=== New voting system (1952-1953) ===
==== 1952 ====
North Vancouver (1952 British Columbia general election)
Party	Candidate	FPv%	Count					
Party	Candidate	FPv%	1	2	3	4	5	6
Liberal	Martin Elliott Sowden	29.38	6,695	6,736	6,744	6,910	8,836	10,292
Co-operative Commonwealth	Dorothy Steeves	27.50	6,268	6,301	6,495	6,527	6,929	8,980
Social Credit	George Henry Tomlinson Jr.	21.71	4,947	4,981	4,998	5,091	5,870	
Progressive Conservative	Arthur Archibald McArthur	17.82	4,061	4,123	4,123	4,135		
Christian Democratic	Mary Freda Ennis	1.50	341	341	342			
Labor-Progressive	Thomas McEwen	1.15	263	265				
Independent	John Howard Fletcher	0.95	216					
Valid: 22,791 Spoilt: 571

North Vancouver (1952 British Columbia general election) (analysis of transferred votes, ranked in order of 1st preference)
Party	Candidate	Maximum round	Maximum votes	Share in maximum round	Maximum votes First round votes Transfer votes
Liberal	Martin Elliott Sowden	6	10,292	53.40%	
Co-operative Commonwealth	Dorothy Steeves	6	8,980	46.60%	
Social Credit	George Henry Tomlinson Jr.	5	5,870	27.13%	
Progressive Conservative	Arthur Archibald McArthur	4	4,135	18.25%	
Christian Democratic	Mary Freda Ennis	3	342	1.51%	
Labor-Progressive	Thomas McEwen	2	265	1.16%	
Independent	John Howard Fletcher	1	216	0.95%	
Exhausted votes			3519	15.44%	

Terminal transfer rates for votes (1952)
Transferred from	Non-transferrable	% transferred to			Total
Transferred from	Non-transferrable	CCF	Socred	Liberal	Total
█ Progressive Conservative	1,028	402	779	1,926	4,135
█ Progressive Conservative	24.86%	9.72%	18.84%	46.58%	100.00%
█ Social Credit	2,363	2,051	–	1,456	5,870
█ Social Credit	40.26%	34.94%	–	24.80%	100.00%

==== 1953 ====
North Vancouver (1953 British Columbia general election)
Party	Candidate	FPv%	Count				
Party	Candidate	FPv%	1	2	3	4	5
Social Credit	George Henry Tomlinson Jr.	35.67	7,728	7,798	7,809	8,127	9,291
Liberal	Wilfrid Robinson MacDougall	29.44	6,377	6,436	6,446	7,247	9,134
Co-operative Commonwealth	Dorothy Steeves	26.87	5,820	5,843	5,968	6,049	
Progressive Conservative	Rodney Beavan	6.18	1,338	1,346	1,350		
Labor-Progressive	Robert Gerald Sarginson	1.00	217	219			
Christian Democratic	Mary Freda Ennis	0.84	182				
Valid: 21,662 Spoilt: 1,108

North Vancouver (1953 British Columbia general election) (analysis of transferred votes, ranked in order of 1st preference)
Party	Candidate	Maximum round	Maximum votes	Share in maximum round	Maximum votes First round votes Transfer votes
Social Credit	George Henry Tomlinson Jr.	5	9,291	50.43%	
Liberal	Wilfrid Robinson MacDougall	5	9,134	49.57%	
Co-operative Commonwealth	Dorothy Steeves	4	6,049	28.24%	
Progressive Conservative	Rodney Beavan	3	1,350	6.26%	
Labor-Progressive	Robert Gerald Sarginson	2	219	1.01%	
Christian Democratic	Mary Freda Ennis	1	182	0.84%	
Exhausted votes			3237	14.94%	

Terminal transfer rates for votes (1953)
Transferred from	Non-transferrable	% transferred to			Total
Transferred from	Non-transferrable	Socred	CCF	Liberal	Total
█ Progressive Conservative	150	318	81	801	1,350
█ Progressive Conservative	11.11%	23.56%	6.00%	59.33%	100.00%
█ Co-operative Commonwealth	2,998	1,164	–	1,887	6,049
█ Co-operative Commonwealth	49.56%	19.24%	–	31.20%	100.00%

=== Return to "First past the post" ===
25th British Columbia election, 1956 ^{1}
Party	Candidate	Votes	%	±	Expenditures
Social Credit	John Melvin Bryan Jr.	11,974	22.29%		unknown
Social Credit	Newton Phillips Steacy	11,298	21.03%		unknown
Liberal	Francis W. (Frank) Millerd	8,425	15.68%		unknown
Liberal	Alexander Bates McQuarrie	6,386	11.89%		unknown
Progressive Conservative	Deane Finlayson	5,121	9.53%		unknown
Co-operative Commonwealth Fed.	John Edward Beltz	4,718	7.78%		unknown
Co-operative Commonwealth Fed.	George Collis	4,266	7.94%		unknown
Independent (SC) ^{2}	George Henry Tomlinson Jr.	902	1.68%		unknown
Independent (SC) ^{2}	Stanley Earl Wilcox	227	0.42%		unknown
Labor-Progressive	Charles Caron	211	0.39%		unknown
Labor-Progressive	Glyn Thomas	191	0.35%		unknown
Total valid votes		53,719	100.00%		unknown
Total rejected ballots		346		unknown	
Turnout					
^{1} Seat increased to two members from one.
^{2} Under the Election Act (SBC 1940 c.20 s.28) Independent candidates could not use "the name of a recognized political party."

26th British Columbia election, 1960
Party	Candidate	Votes	%	±	Expenditures
Liberal	Ray Perrault	14,408	19.92%		unknown
Liberal	James Gordon Gibson	13,287	18.37%		unknown
Social Credit	Newton Phillips Steacy	12,804	17.00%		unknown
Social Credit	Bruce Benjamin Knowlton	12,276	16.97%		unknown
Co-operative Commonwealth Fed.	Orville Garfield Braaten	6,746	9.33%		unknown
Co-operative Commonwealth Fed.	Hugh Clifford	6,720	9.29%		unknown
Progressive Conservative	Deane Finlayson	3,260	4.51%		unknown
Progressive Conservative	Robert Read Maitland	2,397	3.31%		unknown
Communist	William Angus Stewart	242	0.33%		unknown
Communist	Gregory Bruce Yorke	191	0.26%		unknown
Total valid votes		72,331	100.00%		unknown
Total rejected ballots		438		unknown	
Turnout					

27th British Columbia election, 1963
Party	Candidate	Votes	%	±	Expenditures
Liberal	Ray Perrault	16,153	22.03%		unknown
Liberal	James Gordon Gibson	14,068	19.18%		unknown
Social Credit	Harold Peter (Herb) Capozzi	13,215	18.02%		unknown
Social Credit	Frederick Morton Sharp	11,883	16.20%		unknown
New Democrat	Peter Samuel Farinow	5,764	7.86%		unknown
New Democrat	Hugh Clifford	5,409	7.38%		unknown
Progressive Conservative	John Patrick Nowlan	3,567	4.86%		unknown
Progressive Conservative	Ronald Clifton Bray	3,088	4.21%		unknown
Communist	Maurice Rush	190	0.26%		unknown
Total valid votes		73,337	100.00%		unknown
Total rejected ballots		332		unknown	
Turnout					

Following the 1963 election, North Vancouver was redistributed into three one-member seats:

- North Vancouver-Capilano
- North Vancouver-Seymour (current riding)
- West Vancouver-Howe Sound

== See also ==
- List of British Columbia provincial electoral districts
- Canadian provincial electoral districts
- Vancouver (electoral districts)
