= Charles H. P. Tupper =

Canadian politician

Charles Herbert Percy Tupper
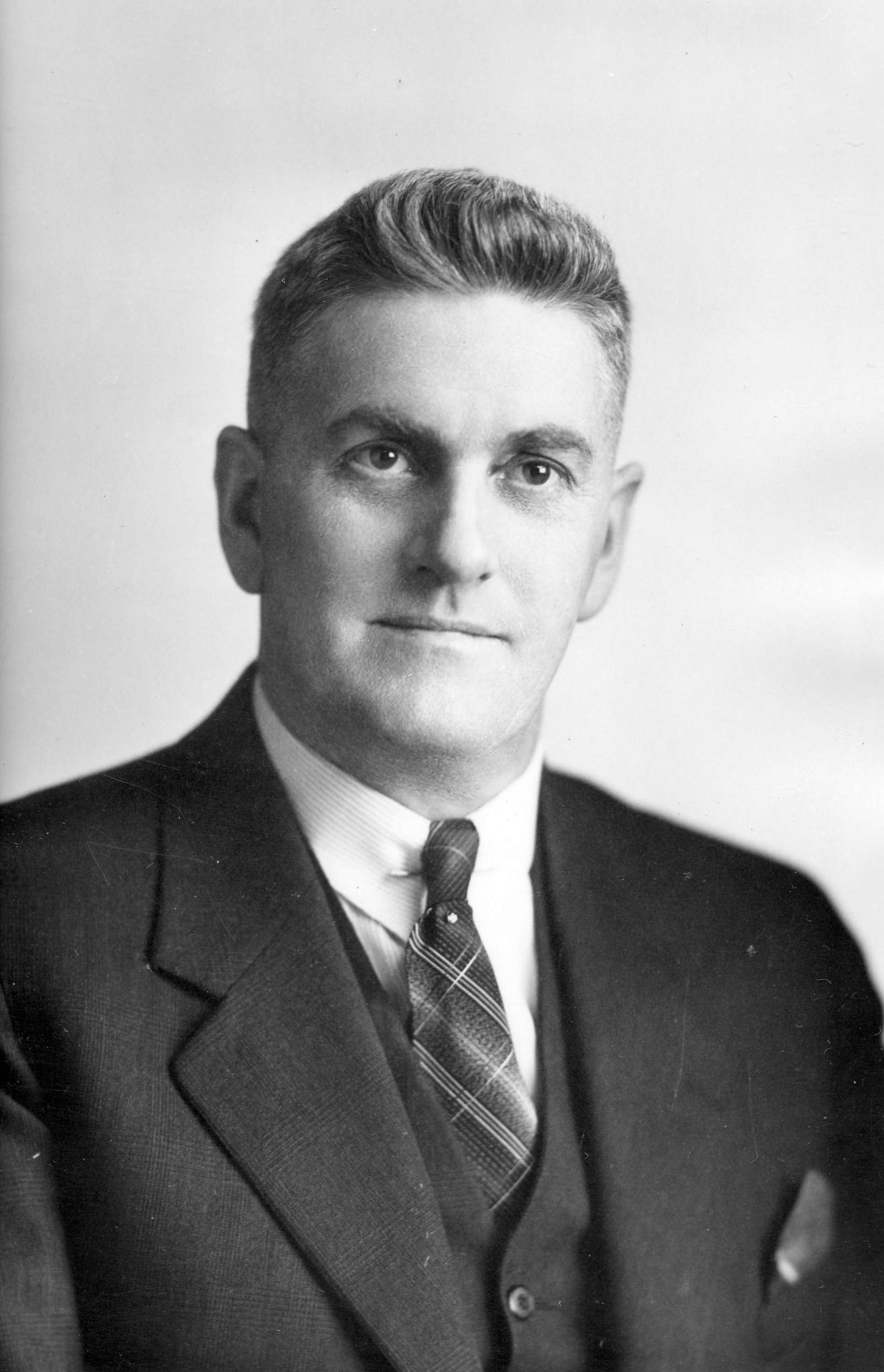
- Tupper in 1937

Member of the Legislative Assembly of British Columbia
- In office 1933–1941
- Preceded by: William Alexander McKenzie
- Succeeded by: Bernard George Webber
- Constituency: Similkameen

Personal details
- Born: October 11, 1887 London, Ontario
- Died: May 18, 1950 (aged 62) Penticton, British Columbia
- Party: BC Liberal
- Spouse: Mabel Elizabeth Rowe
- Children: 3
- Occupation: Locomotive Engineer, C.P.R.

Charles Herbert Percy Tupper (October 11, 1887 – May 18, 1950) was a Canadian politician. After being an unsuccessful candidate in the 1928 provincial election, he served in the Legislative Assembly of British Columbia from 1933 until his defeat in the 1941 provincial election from the electoral district of Similkameen, a member of the British Columbia Liberal Party.
