= Revelstoke (electoral district) =

Defunct provincial electoral district in British Columbia, Canada

Revelstoke was a provincial electoral district of British Columbia, Canada. It made its first appearance on the hustings in the election of 1903 and lasted until the 1928 election. In 1933, it was briefly merged into Columbia–Revelstoke, but was restored for the 1937 election and lasted until 1963.

In 1966 Revelstoke was merged with Kaslo-Slocan to form Revelstoke-Slocan, and in 1979 was merged with Shuswap to form Shuswap-Revelstoke. Since 1991 Revelstoke has been part of Columbia River-Revelstoke.

== Electoral history ==
Note: Winners of each election are in bold.

10th British Columbia election, 1903
Party	Candidate	Votes	%	±	Expenditures
Socialist	John William Bennett	186	22.04%	–	unknown
Liberal	James M. Kellie	316	37.44%		unknown
Conservative	**Thomas Taylor**	342	40.52%		unknown
Total valid votes		844	100.00%		
Total rejected ballots					
Turnout		%			

11th British Columbia election, 1907
Party	Candidate	Votes	%	±	Expenditures
Liberal	Robert Caley	269	33.50%		unknown
Socialist	Wallis Walter LeFeaux	94	11.71%	–	unknown
Conservative	**Thomas Taylor**	**440**	**54.79%**		unknown
Total valid votes		803	100.00%		
Total rejected ballots					
Turnout		%			

12th British Columbia election, 1909
Party	Candidate	Votes	%	±	Expenditures
Socialist	Henry Kempster	121	9.93%	–	unknown
Independent ^{1}	Robert Caley	340	27.89%		unknown
Conservative	**Thomas Taylor**	**758**	**62.18%**		unknown
Total valid votes		1,219	100.00%		
Total rejected ballots					
Turnout		%			
^{1} Endorsed by Liberals.

13th British Columbia election, 1912
Party	Candidate	Votes	%	±	Expenditures
Conservative	**Thomas Taylor**	**Accl.**	-.- %		unknown
Total valid votes		n/a	-.- %		
Total rejected ballots					
Turnout		%			

14th British Columbia election, 1916
Party	Candidate	Votes	%	±	Expenditures
**Liberal**	**William Henry Sutherland**	**802**	**60.62%**		unknown
Conservative	Thomas Taylor	521	39.38%		unknown
Total valid votes		1,323	100.00%		
Total rejected ballots					
Turnout		%			

15th British Columbia election, 1920
Party	Candidate	Votes	%	±	Expenditures
**Liberal**	**William Henry Sutherland**	**Accl.**	-.- %		unknown
Total valid votes		n/a	-.- %		
Total rejected ballots					
Turnout		%			

16th British Columbia election, 1924
Party	Candidate	Votes	%	±	Expenditures
Conservative	Adam Wightman Bell	594	31.92%		unknown
Provincial	John McGivern Humphrey	168	9.03%	–	unknown
**Liberal**	**William Henry Sutherland**	**1,099**	**59.05%**		unknown
Total valid votes		1,861	100.00%		
Total rejected ballots					
Turnout		%			

17th British Columbia election, 1928
Party	Candidate	Votes	%	±	Expenditures
Conservative	Adam Wightman Bell	906	43.64%		unknown
**Liberal**	**William Henry Sutherland**	**1,170**	**56.36%**		unknown
Total valid votes		2,076	100.00%		
Total rejected ballots		52			
Turnout		%			

After the 1928 election there was a redistribution. The Revelstoke riding was merged with the Columbia riding to form Columbia-Revelstoke, which appeared in the 1933 general election. In the following election, they were separate ridings again. For results, see Columbia-Revelstoke.

19th British Columbia election, 1937
Party	Candidate	Votes	%	±	Expenditures
**Liberal**	**Harry Johnston**	**1,162**	**61.2%**		unknown
Conservative	Sturdy	533	28.1%		unknown
Co-operative Commonwealth Fed.	Almen	205	10.8%		unknown
Total valid votes		1900	100.00%		
Total rejected ballots		73			
Turnout		86.7%			

20th British Columbia election, 1941
Party	Candidate	Votes	%	±	Expenditures
**Liberal**	**Harry Johnston**	**1065**	**49.1%**		unknown
Co-operative Commonwealth Fed.	McKenzie	678	31.2%		unknown
Conservative	W. Johnson	427	19.8%		unknown
Total valid votes		2170	100.00%		
Total rejected ballots		27			
Turnout		77.6%			

21st British Columbia election, 1945
Party	Candidate	Votes	%	±	Expenditures
Coalition	**William James Johnson**	**1089**	**51.2%**	–	unknown
Co-operative Commonwealth Fed.	Vincent Segur	1039	48.8%		unknown
Total valid votes		2128	100.00%		
Total rejected ballots		22			
Turnout		74.9%			

22nd British Columbia election, 1949
Party	Candidate	Votes	%	±	Expenditures
Coalition	**Arvid Lundell**	**1311**	**51.0%**	–	unknown
Co-operative Commonwealth Fed.	Vincent Segur	1262	49.0%		unknown
Total valid votes		2573	100.00%		
Total rejected ballots		70			
Turnout		83.5%			

23rd British Columbia election, 1952^{1}
Party	Candidate	Votes 1st count	%	Votes final count	%	±%	
**Co-operative Commonwealth Fed.**	**Vincent Segur**	**942**	**34.5%**	**1320**	**56.5%**		unknown
Liberal	Rutherford	636	23.3%	1015	43.5%		unknown
Social Credit	Paynter	598	21.9%				
Conservative	Arvid Lundell	555	20.3%	-	-.- %		
Total valid votes		2731	100.00%	2335	%		
Total rejected ballots		153					
Turnout		79.1%					
^{1} Preferential ballot; final count is between top two candidates from first count; intermediary counts (of 4) not shown.

24th British Columbia election, 1953^{2}
Party	Candidate	Votes 1st count	%	Votes final count	%	±%	
**Co-operative Commonwealth Fed.**	**Vincent Segur**	**1009**	**37.1%**	**1284**	**55.9%**		unknown
Liberal	Stoodley	551	20.2%	1012	44.1%		unknown
Social Credit	Francis	639	23.5%				
Independent	Arvid Lundell	522	19.2%	-	-.- %		unknown
Total valid votes		2721	100.00%	2296	%		
Total rejected ballots		116					
Turnout		79.4%					
^{2} Preferential ballot; final count is between top two candidates from first count; intermediary counts (of 4) not shown.

25th British Columbia election, 1956
Party	Candidate	Votes	%	±	Expenditures
Social Credit	**Arvid Lundell**	**1339**	**49.8%**	–	unknown
Co-operative Commonwealth Fed.	George Hobbs	985	36.6%		unknown
Liberal	Delacherois	364	13.5%		unknown
Total valid votes		2688	%		
Total rejected ballots		30			
Turnout		68.5%			

25th British Columbia election, 1956
Party	Candidate	Votes	%	±	Expenditures
Social Credit	**Arvid Lundell**	**1339**	**49.8%**	–	unknown
Co-operative Commonwealth Fed.	George Hobbs	985	36.6%		unknown
Liberal	Delacherois	364	13.5%		unknown
Total valid votes		2688	%		
Total rejected ballots		30			
Turnout		68.5%			

26th British Columbia election, 1960
Party	Candidate	Votes	%	±	Expenditures
**Co-operative Commonwealth Fed.**	**George Hobbs**	**1417**	**44.1%**		unknown
Social Credit	Arvid Lundell	945	29.4%	–	unknown
Liberal	Hardman	585	18.2%		unknown
Conservative	McFadden	265	8.3%		unknown
Total valid votes		3212	%		
Total rejected ballots		30			
Turnout		79.0%			

British Columbia provincial by-election, September 4, 1962
Party	Candidate	Votes	%
NDP-CCF	Margaret Hobbs	1,127	42.12
Social Credit	Arvid Lundell	1,066	39.84
Liberal	John Wallace Johnston	483	18.05
Total valid votes		2,676	
Total rejected ballots		15	
Called upon the death of G. Hobbs on 30 January 1962.
Source: http://www.elections.bc.ca/docs/rpt/1871-1986_ElectoralHistoryofBC.pdf

1963 British Columbia general election
Party	Candidate	Votes	%
Social Credit	Arvid Lundell	1,176	41.3
New Democratic	Margaret Hobbs	1,071	37.8
Liberal	William James Burnett	385	13.5
Progressive Conservative	Owen Orlando Williams	211	7.4
Total valid votes		2,843	
Total rejected ballots		15	
Turnout		77.2	
Source: http://www.elections.bc.ca/docs/rpt/1871-1986_ElectoralHistoryofBC.pdf

== See also ==
- List of electoral districts in the Kootenays
- List of British Columbia provincial electoral districts
- Canadian provincial electoral districts
