= Peace River (British Columbia electoral district) =

Defunct provincial electoral district in British Columbia, Canada

Coordinates: 56.229°N 121.350°W

Peace River was a provincial electoral district for the Legislative Assembly of British Columbia, Canada. It made its first appearance in the general election of 1933, and its last was in 1953.

== Electoral history ==
Note: Winners of each election are in bold.

18th British Columbia election, 1933
Party	Candidate	Votes	%	±	Expenditures
United Front (Workers and Farmers)	Emily Loretta Crawford	59	2.30%	–	unknown
Non-Partisan Independent Group	**Clive Montgomery Francis Planta**	**957**	**37.31%**	–	unknown
Co-operative Commonwealth Fed.	Mervin Cecil Simmons	800	31.19%		unknown
Liberal	Wallace Archibald Watson	749	29.20%		unknown
Total valid votes		2,565	100.00%		
Total rejected ballots		19			
Turnout		%			

19th British Columbia election, 1937
Party	Candidate	Votes	%	±	Expenditures
**Liberal**	**Glen Everton Braden**	**1,168**	**42.61%**		unknown
Co-operative Commonwealth Fed.	Charles Wilmer Bumstead	905	33.02%		unknown
Conservative	Thomas Hargreaves	434	15.83%		unknown
Independent	Clive Montgomery Francis Planta	234	8.54%		unknown
Total valid votes		2,741	100.00%		
Total rejected ballots		34			
Turnout		%			

1941 British Columbia general election
Party	Candidate	Votes	%
Liberal	Glen Everton Braden	1,436	51.16
Co-operative Commonwealth	Joseph Hardcastle Corsbie	983	35.02
Independent Farmer	Thomas Jamieson	388	13.82
Total valid votes		2,807	100.00
Total rejected ballots		22	

21st British Columbia election, 1945
Party	Candidate	Votes	%	±	Expenditures
Coalition	Howard Guthrie Atkinson	1,117	31.78%	–	unknown
**Co-operative Commonwealth Fed.**	**Joseph Hardcastle Corsbie**	**1,682**	**47.85%**		unknown
Social Credit Alliance	Margaret Teresa Lally Murray^{2}	716	13.82%	–	unknown
Total valid votes		3,515	100.00%		
Total rejected ballots		27			
Turnout		%			
^{2} Publisher/editor of the Alaska Highway News and wife of George Matheson Murray, formerly MLA for Lillooet (1933–1941) and later MP for Cariboo.

1949 British Columbia general election
Party	Candidate	Votes	%
Coalition	Glen Everton Braden	2,342	49.69
Co-operative Commonwealth	Joseph Hardcastle Corsbie	1,901	40.34
People's Co-operative Commonwealth	Philip Franklin Tompkins	470	9.97
Total valid votes		4,713	100.00
Total rejected ballots		52	

23rd British Columbia election, 1952 ^{3}
Party	Candidate	Votes 1st count	%	Votes final count	%	±%	
Liberal	Glen Everton Braden	1,425	26.14%	-	-.- %		unknown
Co-operative Commonwealth Fed.	Arthur Roald Dahlen	1,571	28.82%	1,865	38.80%		unknown
Progressive Conservative	Walter Clarence Henderson	278	5.10%	-	-.- %		unknown
Social Credit League	**Charles William Parker**	**2,178**	**39.95%**	**2,942**	**61.20%**		
Total valid votes		5,452	100.00%	4,807			
Total rejected ballots		151					
Turnout		%					
^{3} Preferential ballot. First and final counts of three (3) shown only.

24th British Columbia election, 1953 ^{4}
Party	Candidate	Votes 1st count	%	Votes final count	%	±%	
Co-operative Commonwealth Fed.	Arthur Roald Dahlen	1,921	33.24%	2,216	42.31%		unknown
Social Credit League	**Charles William Parker**	**2,481**	**42.92%**	**3,022**	**57.69%**		
Liberal	Stanley Weston	1,378	23.84%	-	-.- %		unknown
Total valid votes		5,780	100.00%	5,238			
Total rejected ballots		316					
Turnout		%					
^{4} Preferential ballot. First and final counts of twp (2) shown only.

After the 1953 election the Peace River riding was partitioned into North Peace River and South Peace River.

== See also ==
- List of British Columbia provincial electoral districts
- Canadian provincial electoral districts
