= Rolf Wallgren Bruhn =

Canadian politician (1878–1942)

MLA for Salmon Arm
- In office 1924–1942

Personal details
- Born: Rolf Wallgren; September 4, 1878 Resterod Parish, Sweden
- Died: August 30, 1942 (aged 63) Vancouver, British Columbia, Canada
- Party: British Columbia Conservative Party
- Other political affiliations: Non-Partisan Independent Group (1933—1937)
- Spouse: Anna Treat

Rolf Wallgren Bruhn (September 4, 1878 – August 30, 1942) was a Swedish-born farmer, lumberman and political figure in British Columbia. He represented Salmon Arm in the Legislative Assembly of British Columbia from 1924 to 1942 as a Conservative.

He was born Rolf Wallgren in Resterod parish, in 1878, the son of Axel Wallgren. His father, a Crown Reeve in Sweden, was accused of embezzlement in 1890 and subsequently adopted the surname Bruhn and went to Canada, leaving his family behind. The family moved to Gothenburg, where his mother operated a bakery. In 1894, Rolf left school and worked as a deckhand on freighters. He won a sailboat in a raffle in 1895; he gave most of the money to his mother and bought a ticket to Canada.

There, like his father, he adopted the surname Bruhn. Bruhn worked as a sailor on the Great Lakes; moving west, he worked on the railway and as a miner and logger. In 1898, he settled in Malakwa, British Columbia. Bruhn married Anna Treat in 1902. Bruhn supplemented his income from farming with road contract work. In 1910, he moved with his family to Salmon Arm, working as a road foreman and then road superintendent. He also served four years as an alderman.

Bruhn lost his position of road superintendent after the Liberals were elected in 1916. He moved to Sicamous, where he established a business producing cedar poles. Bruhn was badly burned in a fire and, for a time, his wife managed the company. The company expanded, building a lumber mill at Canoe and adding logs and railway ties to its products.

He was named to the Conservative cabinet as President of the Executive Council in 1928 and as Minister of Public Works in 1930.

In the 1933 British Columbia general election, Bruhn ran for the Non-Partisan Independent Group, the grouping led by former premier William John Bowser following the fragmentation of the Conservative Party. He was re-elected in Salmon Arm, becoming one of the group's two elected MLAs alongside Clive Planta.

Bruhn helped draft the platform for the Social Constructive Party in 1937 and, although he ran as an Independent candidate in the 1937 general election, he was endorsed by the Constructives. The Social Constructive Party was not successful and Bruhn ran again as a Conservative in 1941. Later that year, he was again Minister of Public Works in a Liberal/Conservative coalition government. Bruhn suffered a stroke and died in office the following year. He also served as Minister of Railways between December 1941 and his death in August 1942.
