= Clive Planta =

Canadian politician

Member of the Legislative Assembly of British Columbia
- In office 1933–1937
- Succeeded by: Glen Everton Braden
- Constituency: Peace River

Personal details
- Born: August 11, 1895 Nanaimo, British Columbia
- Died: April 17, 1972 (aged 76) Victoria, British Columbia
- Party: Non-Partisan Independent Group (NPIG)
- Spouse: Annie Ethel Copeland
- Occupation: Merchant

Clive Montgomery Francis Planta (August 11, 1895–April 17, 1972) was a Canadian politician. He served in the Legislative Assembly of British Columbia from 1933 to 1937 from the electoral district of Peace River, a Non-Partisan Independent Group member. Running as a strict independent, he was defeated in his bid for a second term in the Legislature in the 1937 provincial election. He never did seek provincial office again. He was the son of Canadian politician Albert Planta. Planta later served as the manager of the Fisheries Council of Canada and as Deputy Minister of Fisheries for Newfoundland.
