= Salmon Arm (electoral district) =

Defunct provincial electoral district in British Columbia, Canada

Salmon Arm was the name of a provincial electoral district in the Canadian province of British Columbia including on the town of Salmon Arm on Shuswap Lake. The riding first appeared in the 1924 election. After the 1966 election there was a redistribution with the resulting riding in the same area being Shuswap.

== Electoral history ==
Note: Winners in each election are in bold.

16th British Columbia election, 1924
Party	Candidate	Votes	%	±	Expenditures
Conservative	**Rolf Wallgren Bruhn**	**920**	**36.83%**		unknown
Provincial	William Arthur Algernon Warren	824	32.99%	–	unknown
Liberal	Francis Edward Wilcox	754	30.18%		unknown
Total valid votes		2,498	100.00%		
Total rejected ballots					
Turnout		%			

17th British Columbia election, 1928
Party	Candidate	Votes	%	±	Expenditures
Conservative	**Rolf Wallgren Bruhn**	**1,706**	**73.25%**		unknown
Liberal	James Smart	623	26.75%		unknown
Total valid votes		2,329	100.00%		
Total rejected ballots		24			
Turnout		%			

18th British Columbia election, 1933
Party	Candidate	Votes	%	±	Expenditures
Non-Partisan Independent Group	**Rolf Wallgren Bruhn**	**1,351**	**44.82%**	–	unknown
Liberal	James Reginald Colley	888	29.46%		unknown
United Front (Workers and Farmers)	Bert Samson	172	5.71%	–	unknown
Co-operative Commonwealth Fed.	George Faulds Stirling	603	20.01%		unknown
Total valid votes		3,014	100.00%		
Total rejected ballots		20			
Turnout		%			

19th British Columbia election, 1937
Party	Candidate	Votes	%	±	Expenditures
Liberal	Harold Willett Birch	884	27.87%		unknown
**Independent**	**Rolf Wallgren Bruhn ^{1}**	**1,533**	**48.33%**		unknown
Co-operative Commonwealth Fed.	Robert Wood	755	23.80%		unknown
Total valid votes		3,172	100.00%		
Total rejected ballots		71			
Turnout		%			
^{1} Supported and endorsed by the B.C. Constructives.

20th British Columbia election, 1941
Party	Candidate	Votes	%	±	Expenditures
Liberal	Arthur Fancett Barton	468	18.06%		unknown
Conservative	**Rolf Wallgren Bruhn**	**1,561**	**60.22%**		unknown
Co-operative Commonwealth Fed.	John William Tordoff	563	21.72%		unknown
Total valid votes		2,592	100.00%		
Total rejected ballots		52			
Turnout		%			

31st British Columbia election, 1945
Party	Candidate	Votes	%	±	Expenditures
Coalition	**Arthur Brown Ritchie**	**1,560**	**60.00%**	–	unknown
Co-operative Commonwealth Fed.	George Faulds Stirling	1,040	40.00%		unknown
Total valid votes		2,600	100.00%		
Total rejected ballots		28			
Turnout		%			

22nd British Columbia election, 1949
Party	Candidate	Votes	%	±	Expenditures
Co-operative Commonwealth Fed.	Russell Carleton Freeze	1,681	39.93%		unknown
Coalition	**Arthur Brown Ritchie**	**2,529**	**60.07%**	–	unknown
Total valid votes		4,210	100.00%		
Total rejected ballots		86			
Turnout		%			

23rd British Columbia election, 1952 ^{2}
Party	Candidate	Votes 1st count	%	Votes final count	%	±%	
Liberal	John James Carmichael	669	15.69%	-	-.- %		unknown
**B.C. Social Credit League**	**James Allan Reid**	**1,462**	**34.30%**	**1,979**	**55.03%**		unknown
Conservative	Arthur Brown Ritchie	896	21.02%	-	%		unknown
Co-operative Commonwealth Fed.	William John Thompson	1,236	28.99%	1,617	44.97%		unknown
Total valid votes		4,263	100.00%	3,596	%		
Total rejected ballots		164					
Turnout		%					
^{2} Preferential ballot. First and final counts of three (3) shown only.

24th British Columbia election, 1953 ^{3}
Party	Candidate	Votes 1st count	%	Votes final count	%	±%	
Liberal	John James Carmichael	623	14.52%	-	-.- %		unknown
Social Credit	James Allan Reid	1,627	37.91%	2,013	52.71%		
Conservative	Arthur Brown Ritchie	600	13.98%	-	%		unknown
Co-operative Commonwealth Fed.	William John Thompson	1,341	31.24%	1,806	47.29%		unknown
Labor-Progressive	Gwyn Lorne Walters	101	2.35%	-	-.- %		
Total valid votes		4,292	100.00%	3,819	%		
Total rejected ballots		167					
Turnout		%					
^{3} Preferential ballot. First and final counts of four (4) shown only.

25th British Columbia election, 1956
Party	Candidate	Votes	%	±	Expenditures
Liberal	Greta Dagma Abbing de Vries	339	8.15%		unknown
Social Credit	**James Allan Reid**	**2,131**	**51.24%**	–	unknown
Co-operative Commonwealth Fed.	William John Thompson	1,454	34.96%		unknown
Progressive Conservative	Dennis Allen Williams	235	5.65%		unknown
Total valid votes		4,159	100.00%		
Total rejected ballots		79			
Turnout		%			

26th British Columbia election, 1960
Party	Candidate	Votes	%	±	Expenditures
Co-operative Commonwealth Fed.	Kenneth Carr Haines	1,667	35.17%		unknown
Social Credit	**Willis Franklin Jefcoat**	**1,979**	**41.75%**	–	unknown
Progressive Conservative	Torquil (Torque) MacLeod	613	12.93%		unknown
Liberal	Donald Edmund Nunn	481	10.15%		unknown
Total valid votes		4,740	100.00%		
Total rejected ballots		59			
Turnout		%			

27th British Columbia election, 1963
Party	Candidate	Votes	%	±	Expenditures
Progressive Conservative	James Churchill	1,005	20.29%		unknown
Social Credit	**Willis Franklin Jefcoat**	**2,058**	**41.55%**	–	unknown
Liberal	Byron O.S. Johnson	245	4.95%		unknown
New Democratic	Leonard Terrence O'Neill	1,645	33.21%		unknown
Total valid votes		4,953	100.00%		
Total rejected ballots		57			
Turnout		%			

A redistribution took place before the 1966 election, after which the Shuswap Lake area became represented by the renamed riding of Shuswap.

== See also ==
- List of British Columbia provincial electoral districts
- Canadian provincial electoral districts
- List of electoral districts in the Kootenays
- List of electoral districts in the Okanagan
