= Maurice Finnerty =

Canadian politician

Maurice Patrick Finnerty (June 19, 1913 – June 11, 1977) was a radio station owner and political figure in British Columbia. He represented Similkameen in the Legislative Assembly of British Columbia from 1949 to 1952 as a Liberal. Finnerty was mayor of Penticton from 1962 to 1967.

He was born in Fort Frances, Ontario, the son of Patrick J. Finnerty and Clara Collins. During World War II, Finnerty served with the Seaforth Highlanders. In 1942, he married Lesley Merle Armstrong. Finnerty owned an insurance business. He served in the provincial assembly as a member of a Liberal-Conservative coalition. Finnerty was defeated when he ran for reelection in 1952. He owned radio stations CKOR, CKOK, CKGF and CKOO in Penticton, Grand Forks and Osoyoos until May 1972 and served as president of the B.C. Association of Radio and Television Broadcasters. Finnerty died in Penticton at the age of 64.
