= Ernest Bakewell =

Canadian politician

Ernest Bakewell (1898–1983) was an English-born chemical engineer and political figure in British Columbia. He represented Mackenzie in the Legislative Assembly of British Columbia from 1933 to 1937 as a Co-operative Commonwealth Federation (CCF) and then Social Constructive member.

He was born in Leicester and was educated in Nottingham. He came to British Columbia around 1924, settling in Ocean Falls, where he worked for a pulp and paper company. Bakewell left the CCF in 1936 to join Robert Connell's Social Constructives. He left British Columbia around 1939 and returned to England. After training in the matter of munitions production he returned to Canada during WW2 to assist in the setting up of munitions manufacturing facilities in the province of Quebec. He settled in Montreal and then finally Terrebonne, Quebec. He worked for Combustion Engineering Superheater Ltd and finally as a Canadian liaison for a German-based high pressure piping manufacturer. He was in his later years an avid gardener and worked full-time until age 75.
