= Glen Everton Braden =

Canadian politician (1899–1967)

Glen Everton Braden (July 19, 1899 – December 20, 1967) was a merchant and political figure in British Columbia. He represented Peace River in the Legislative Assembly of British Columbia from 1937 to 1945 and from 1949 to 1952 as a Liberal.

He was born in Vancouver, British Columbia and received his education there. Later, Braden operated a farm with his mother and brothers in the Peace River area near Rolla. In 1928, with his brothers, he established a business that sold farm machinery, cars, oil, and gas. In 1930, he married Louisa Gordon. In 1933, Braden and his family moved to Dawson Creek, where he was an agent for the British-American Oil Company (later acquired by Gulf Oil). He was defeated when he ran for reelection to the assembly in 1952. Braden served as president of the Dawson Creek Board of Trade and also held the position of magistrate. Additionally, he assumed the role of mayor in Dawson Creek from 1962 to 1964. In 1965, Braden moved to Calgary, Alberta. He died there at the age of 68.

== Election results (partial) ==
1941 British Columbia general election: Peace River
| Party | Candidate | Votes | % |
|---|---|---|---|
| Liberal | Glen Everton Braden | 1,436 | 51.16 |
| Co-operative Commonwealth | Joseph Hardcastle Corsbie | 983 | 35.02 |
| Independent Farmer | Thomas Jamieson | 388 | 13.82 |
| Total valid votes | | 2,807 | 100.00 |
| Total rejected ballots | | 22 | |
