= Harley Anderson =

Canadian politician (1884–1934)

Harley C. E. Anderson

Member of the Legislative Assembly of British Columbia
- In office 1933–1934
- Preceded by: Jack Loutet
- Succeeded by: Dorothy Steeves
- Constituency: North Vancouver

Personal details
- Born: February 3, 1884 Scotland
- Died: April 17, 1934 (aged 50) North Vancouver, British Columbia
- Party: British Columbia CCF
- Spouse: Nina
- Occupation: Politician

Harley Christian Erskine Anderson (February 3, 1884 – April 17, 1934) was a Canadian politician. He served in the Legislative Assembly of British Columbia from the 1933 provincial election until his death in office in 1934, from the electoral district of North Vancouver, a member of the Co-operative Commonwealth Federation party.
