= Bernard George Webber =

Canadian politician

MLA for Similkameen
- In office 1941–1945

Personal details
- Born: August 6, 1914 Winnipeg, Manitoba
- Died: December 5, 2000 (aged 86) Vancouver, British Columbia
- Party: Co-operative Commonwealth Federation

Bernard George Webber (August 6, 1914 – December 5, 2000) was an educator and political figure in British Columbia. He represented Similkameen from 1941 to 1945 as a Co-operative Commonwealth Federation member.

He was born in Winnipeg, Manitoba. He was employed as a school principal, as a District Superintendent of Schools, as an assistant Superintendent of Public Instruction for the Ministry of Education and as Superintendent of Special Education for the ministry. Webber was president of the Okanagan Historical Society from 1989 to 1991. He was defeated by Reginald Robert Laird when he ran for reelection in 1945. He was also defeated in a 1945 provincial byelection and in the 1949 provincial election. Webber died in Victoria, British Columbia Victoria at the age of 86.

Webber wrote the book Webber, Bernard (1993). Silk trains: the romance of Canadian silk trains. Word Works Publications. ISBN 0-9696187-1-9..
