= Helen Douglas Smith =

Canadian politician

Member of the Legislative Assembly of British Columbia
- In office 1933–1941
- Constituency: Vancouver-Burrard

Personal details
- Born: Helen Douglas Robson; July 10, 1886 New Westminster, British Columbia
- Died: July 3, 1955 (aged 68) at sea en route to Europe
- Party: British Columbia Liberal Party
- Spouse: Paul Moody Smith
- Children: 2
- Occupation: teacher

Helen Douglas Smith (July 10, 1886 – July 3, 1955) was a Canadian politician. After being defeated in the 1928 provincial election, she served in the Legislative Assembly of British Columbia for two terms from 1933 until her defeat in 1941, from the electoral district of Vancouver-Burrard, a member of the Liberal party.
