= William Henry Sutherland =

Canadian politician

Dr. William Henry Sutherland (November 19, 1876 – September 3, 1945) was a physician and political figure in British Columbia. He was mayor of Revelstoke from 1912 to 1916. He represented Revelstoke from 1916 to 1933 and Columbia-Revelstoke from 1933 to 1937 in the Legislative Assembly of British Columbia as a Liberal.

He was born in Sea View, Prince Edward Island, the son of Robert Sutherland, and received his early education at Prince of Wales College and his medical degree at McGill University. He served as house surgeon for the Royal Victoria Hospital in Montreal from 1899 to 1901. He then became divisional surgeon for the C.P.R. and moved to Kamloops. In 1902, Sutherland set up practice in Revelstoke. He married Lillian O'Donahoe in 1907. Sutherland became president of the British Columbia Medical Council in 1909. Sutherland served in the provincial cabinet as Minister of Public Works from 1922 to 1928, as Minister of Railways from 1924 to 1928, and as Minister of Mines in 1928. He was regarded as a leading figure in the Liberal party. When the Liberal government was defeated in 1928, he became house surgeon for the Hotel Vancouver. Sutherland married Ruth Catherine McKinnon after the death of his first wife. He died, while retired, in Vancouver at the age of 68.
