= Mussallem =

Mussallem is a surname. Notable people with the surname include:

- George Mussallem (1908–2007), Canadian car dealer and politician
- Helen Mussallem (1915–2012), Canadian nurse
