= Canadian Museum of History =

Canada's national museum on anthropology, ethnology, and history

- Musée canadien de l'histoire

- The museum from across the Ottawa River
- Established: 1856; 170 years ago (Note: The following year was when the Geological Museum (later renamed the National Museum of Canada) was formed by the Geological Survey of Canada, through an Act of the Legislative Assembly of the Province of Canada. In 1968, the National Museum of Canada was split, with its human history departments forming the National Museum of Man. The National Museum of Man was later renamed the Canadian Museum of Civilization in 1986, and the Canadian Museum of History in 2013.)
- Location: 100 Laurier Street, Gatineau, Quebec, Canada
- Coordinates: 45°25′47″N 075°42′32″W
- Type: Anthropology, cultural, ethnology, and history museum
- Director: Caroline Dromaguet (acting)
- Chairperson: Carole Beaulieu
- Architect: Douglas Cardinal
- Owner: Canadian Museum of History
- Website: www.historymuseum.ca

Canadian Museum of History network
- Canadian Museum of History; Canadian War Museum; Virtual Museum of New France

The Canadian Museum of History (French: Musée canadien de l’histoire) is a national museum on anthropology, Canadian history, cultural studies, and ethnology in Gatineau, Quebec, Canada. The purpose of the museum is to promote the heritage of Canada, as well as support related research. The museum is based in a 75,000-square-metre-building (810,000 sq ft) designed by Douglas Cardinal.

The museum originated from one established by the Geological Survey of Canada in 1856, which later expanded to include an anthropology division in 1910. In 1927, the institution was renamed the National Museum of Canada. The national museum was later split into several separate institutions in 1968, with the anthropology and human history departments forming the National Museum of Man. The museum relocated to its present location in Gatineau in 1989 and adopted the name Canadian Museum of Civilization (French: Musée canadien des civilisations) the following year. In 2013, the museum adopted its current name, the Canadian Museum of History, and modified its mandate to emphasize Canadian identity and history.

The museum's collection contains over three million artifacts and documents, with some on display in the museum's permanent exhibitions. The museum also hosts and organizes a number of temporary, travelling, and online exhibitions, like the Virtual Museum of New France.

== History ==
=== Early museum (1856–1968) ===
The Canadian Museum of History originates from the collecting efforts of the Geological Survey of Canada (GSC), an organization established in 1842 in Montreal. In 1856 the Legislative Assembly of the Province of Canada passed an act that enabled the GSC to establish a museum to exhibit items found from its geological and archaeological field trips; with the museum initially established in Montreal on Great St. James Street (now Saint Jacques Street). The museum held its first ethnological exhibit from 1862 to 1863, showcasing stone implements and fragments of pottery by First Nations. In 1877, the museum mandate was formally expanded to include the study of modern fauna and flora, in addition to human history, languages, and traditions.

In 1881, the museum relocated from Montreal to downtown Ottawa to what is now referred to as Former Geological Survey of Canada Building; although space in the new facility soon proved to be inadequate, with the Royal Society of Canada petitioning the federal government to build a new building for the museum by 1896. Preliminary plans for a new building were drawn up by 1899, although work on the building did not begin until 1906. In the following year, management of the museum was handed over from the GSC to the Department of Mines, with the mandate formally expanded to include anthropological studies. The new museum building, the Victoria Memorial Museum Building, was also completed in 1910, although it was not opened to the public until 1911.

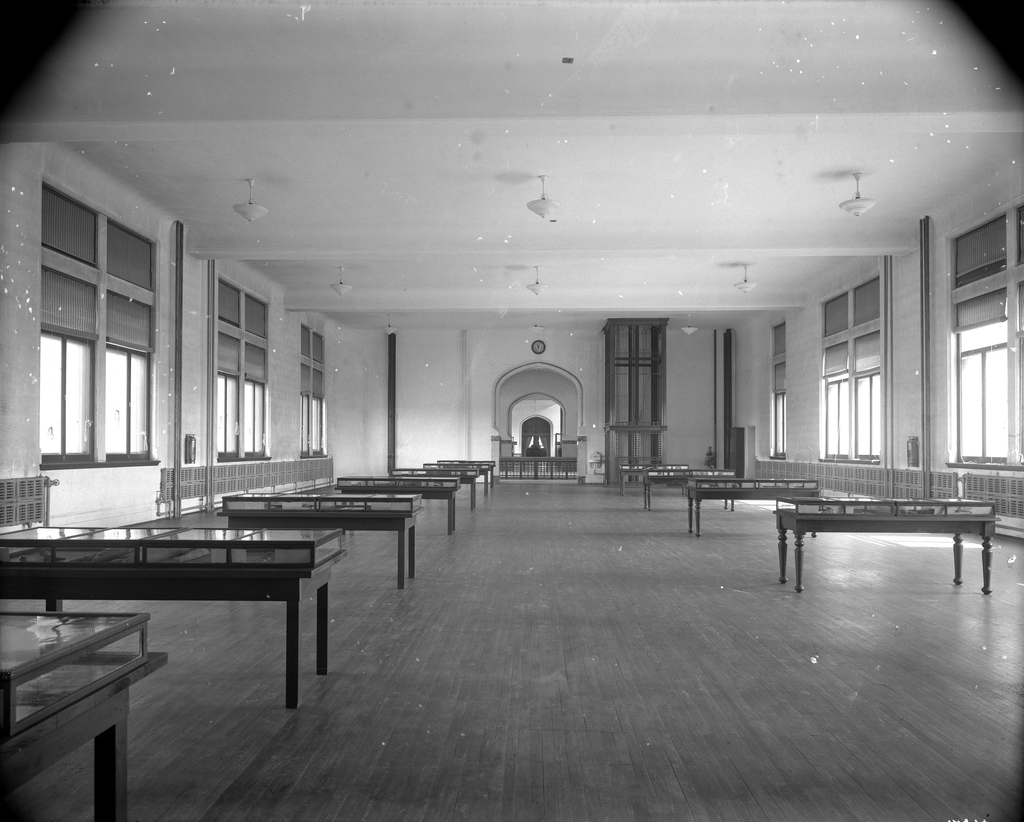
Vitrines filled with items for a temporary exhibition at the National Museum of Canada in 1912

Under the Department of Mines, the museum formally established an anthropology division under the direction of Edward Sapir in 1910. Another anthropologist, Marius Barbeau, was also hired by the museum in the following year to assist Sapir. The anthropology division was charged with the preservation of the cultural heritage of people in Canada and assembling objects related to these cultures. Under Sapir's direction, the institution's research initially focused on Aboriginal communities across Canada they believed were imperilled by rapid acculturation. The museum's first anthropological exhibits were organized by Sapir and his protege, Franz Boas. Since this period, the museum had become a centre for Canadian anthropology, having attracted notable anthropologists including Diamond Jenness after the Second World War.

In 1927, the museum division of the Department of Mines was renamed the National Museum of Canada. Management of the National Museum is transferred from the Department of Mines to the Department of Resources and Development in 1950. In 1965, the museum was split into two branches, one focused on natural history and another on human history. The mandate of the museum further expanded in the following decades, with the museum assuming the management of the Canadian War Museum in 1958, and its human history branch establishing a history division in 1964.

=== Museum of anthropology and history (1968–present) ===
On 1 April 1968, the branches of the National Museum of Canada were formally split into separate museums. The Canadian Museum of History originated from the human history branch of the museum, initially incorporated as the National Museum of Man. The natural history branch of the former National Museum of Canada became the National Museum of Natural Sciences (later renamed the Canadian Museum of Nature), while the science and technology branch became the National Museum of Science and Technology (later renamed the Canada Science and Technology Museum). The National Museums of Canada Corporation was formed by the federal government in order to manage these national museums, in addition to the National Gallery of Canada. Although the institutions were split, the National Museum of Man and the National Museum of Natural History continued to share the Victoria Memorial building; with the National Museum of Man occupying the western half of the building.

In April 1972, the National Museum of Man established a Communications Division in order to provide media communications regarding the museum's education and information programs. During the 1970s, the staff of the institution adopted a philosophy that stressed public access to its heritage collection. Because the Victoria Memorial Museum building had insufficient space to exhibit the museum's growing collection, the museum's collection and staff were scattered across 17 buildings, with these buildings acting as decentralized units of the museum.

In 1980, management of the National Museums of Canada Corporation is transferred to the Department of Communications. The following year in June 1981, the cabinet of Canada approved several plans concerning several national museums of Canada, including moving the National Museum of Man into a new structure. The plan was formally announced to the public in February 1982. After a study of potential locations saw four sites in Ottawa and one in Gatineau. A site acquired by the National Capital Commission (NCC) from the E.B Eddy Company in Gatineau was chosen as the site for the new museum; due to it already being public land, being linked to Confederation Boulevard, and because it was prominently visible from the Ottawa River. The site was also selected because the NCC had desired to develop Hull, and incorporate it into the design of the capital region; while officials in Gatineau had similar desires to develop the area into an urban park. On 10 February 1983, the site for the new museum was announced to the public; and Douglas Cardinal Architect Limited was named as the project's design architect, in association with Montreal-based architectural firm Tétreault, Parent, Languedoc et Associés. The design created by Cardinal was approved in 1983 by the Cabinet of Canada.

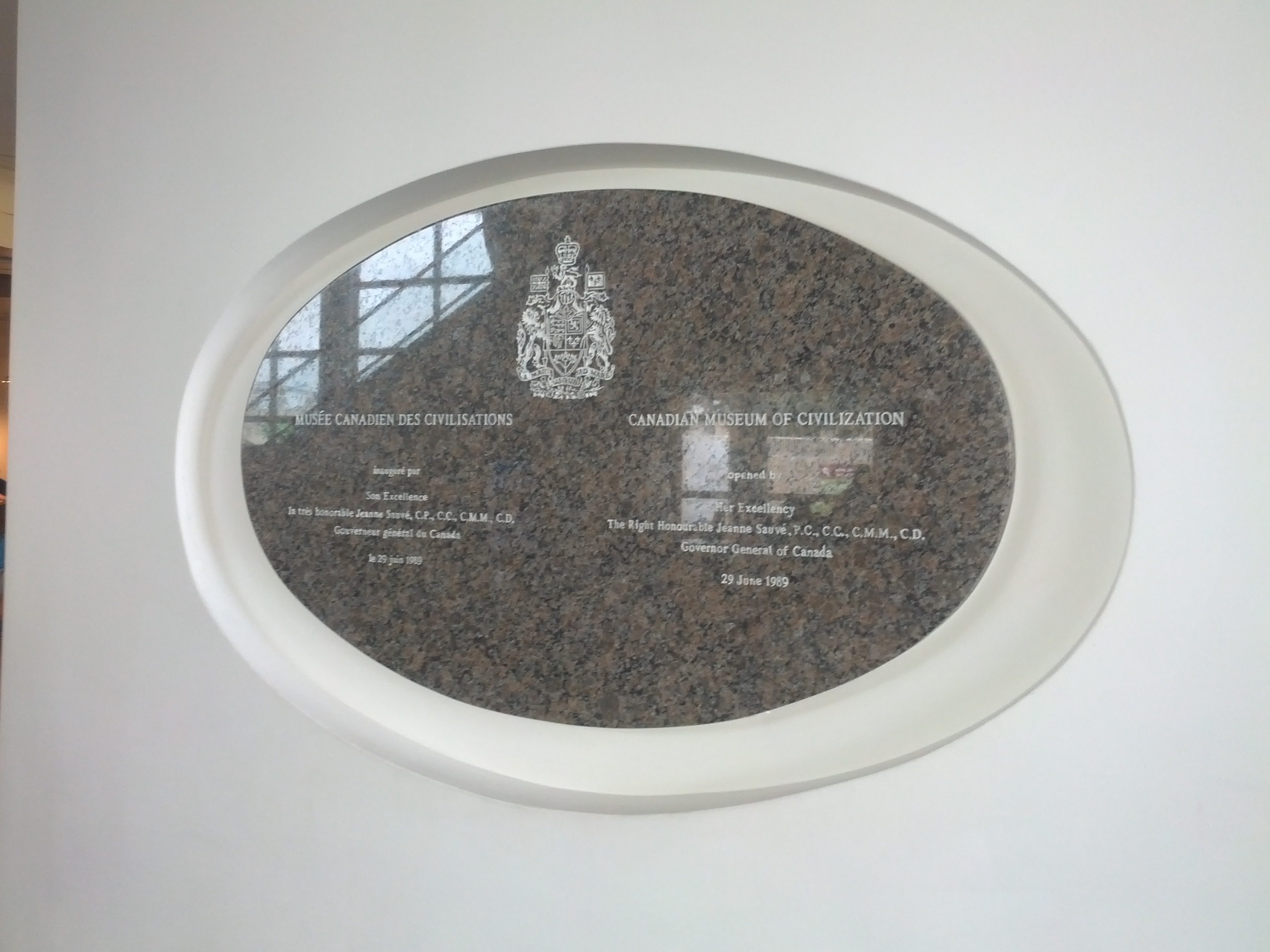
A plaque inside the museum commemorating the opening of the new building by the governor general of Canada in June 1989

In an effort to avoid stereotypes in languages, the name of the museum was changed to the Canadian Museum of Civilization in 1986. In 1988, the institution absorbed the museum operated by the department of the Minister responsible for Canada Post Corporation, although its philatelic collection was transferred to the National Archives of Canada. The museum opened its new building in Gatineau in 1989. However, the building opened with only two permanent exhibitions, Canada Hall and the exhibitions on the Indigenous peoples of the Pacific Northwest Coast, as budgetary shortfalls prevented the museum from opening the exhibitions it had originally planned for the museum.

In 1990, the Museum Act was passed by the federal government, replacing the defunct National Museums of Canada Corporation and forming several new entities to manage the national museums of Canada; with the Canadian Museum of Civilization corporation formed on 1 July 1990 to manage the Canadian Museum of Civilization, and the Canadian War Museum.

==== 21st century ====
In 2007, the museum organized a temporary exhibition, Treasures from China, in partnership with the National Museum of China. The partnership saw artifacts leave China to be exhibited only at the Canadian Museum of Civilization. As a part of the agreement, the Canadian Museum of Civilization prepared Indigenous Canadian artifacts for its own exhibition, First Peoples of Canada: Masterworks from the Canadian Museum of Civilization, at the Palace Museum in Beijing.

In October 2012, James Moore, the minister of Canadian Heritage announced the ministry would provide $25 million to overhaul the museum and renovate Canada Hall. The government later announced plans to update and reopen the gallery in 2017, coinciding with the 150th anniversary of Canada. Approximately 24,000 people from across nine Canadian cities were surveyed about the updates to the exhibition. The museum consulted a women's history committee, an indigenous history committee, and three historic time-period committees.

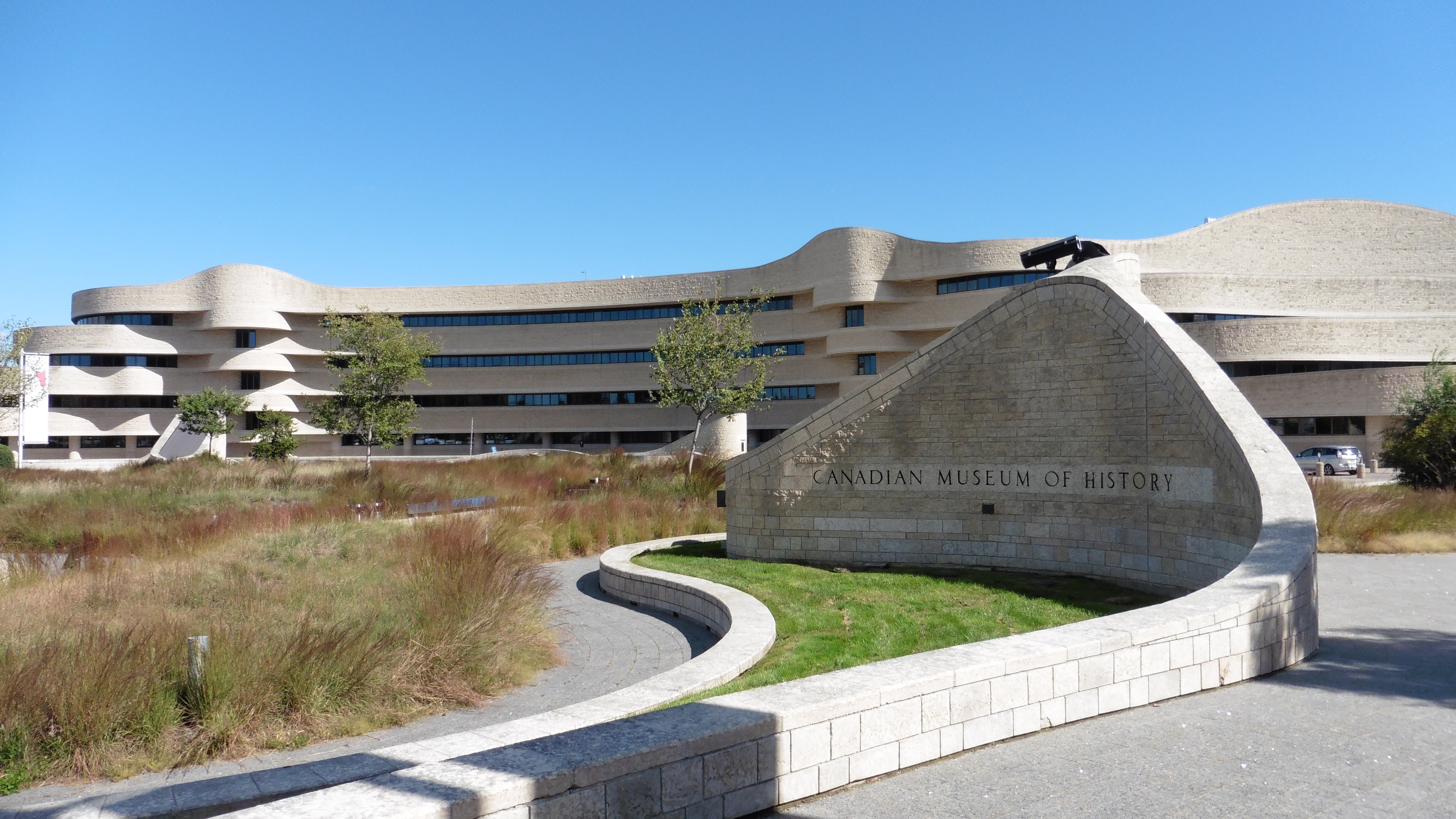
Signage outside the museum bearing its new name in 2016.

In December 2013, the Canadian Museum of History Act received Royal Assent, which shifted the museum's mandate from developing a collection with a "special but not exclusive reference to Canada," to one that enhanced the knowledge of Canadian history and identity; and expanding the museum's focus to include social and political history. The Act also changed the institution's name from the Canadian Museum of Civilization to the Canadian Museum of History. The Canadian Postal Museum, a department of the Canadian Museum of Civilization corporation that operated from within the institution was shut down in 2012 as a result of the museum's transition into the Canadian Museum of History.

Some have criticized the new mandate and updating of Canada Hall as a part of a wider plan by the incumbent Conservative government to redirect public historical understanding to emphasize aspects of Canadian military history and monarchism; as well as elide problematic elements of Canadian history in favour of achievements. However, the museum contended that new exhibits planned for the museum will include a range of themes and topics, and will also explore the country's "dark episodes". The updated gallery was completed at approximately $30 million and was opened on Canada Day in 2017 by Charles, Prince of Wales and Mélanie Joly, the minister of Canadian Heritage. Partisan concerns were alleviated after Canadian History Hall was unveiled to the public.

In 2025, a hobbyist built a Lego replica of the museum. Architect Douglas Cardinal sent him 80 pages of architectural blueprints for the project.

== Site ==
Brass model of Parliament Hill and the surrounding area, including the Canadian Museum of History

The museum is situated on a 9.6-hectare (23.7-acre) plot of land, formerly known as Parc Laurier. The museum site is the first Canadian national museum to be located on the Gatineau side of the National Capital Region, and the first to be located adjacent to the Ottawa River.

The site is bounded by the western access point for the Alexandra Bridge, the Ottawa River to the east, a paper production plant to the south, and Laurier Street to the west. The median of the property extends 235 metres (771 ft) from Laurier Street to the river. From Laurier Street, the property descends towards the Ottawa River at a 5.5 per cent grade; with the portion of the property closest to Laurier Street at an elevation of 53.5 metres (176 ft), while the riverfront is at an elevation of 41 metres (135 ft). Because of the property's low elevation, the construction of the museum building was limited to the portion of the property closer to Laurier Street.

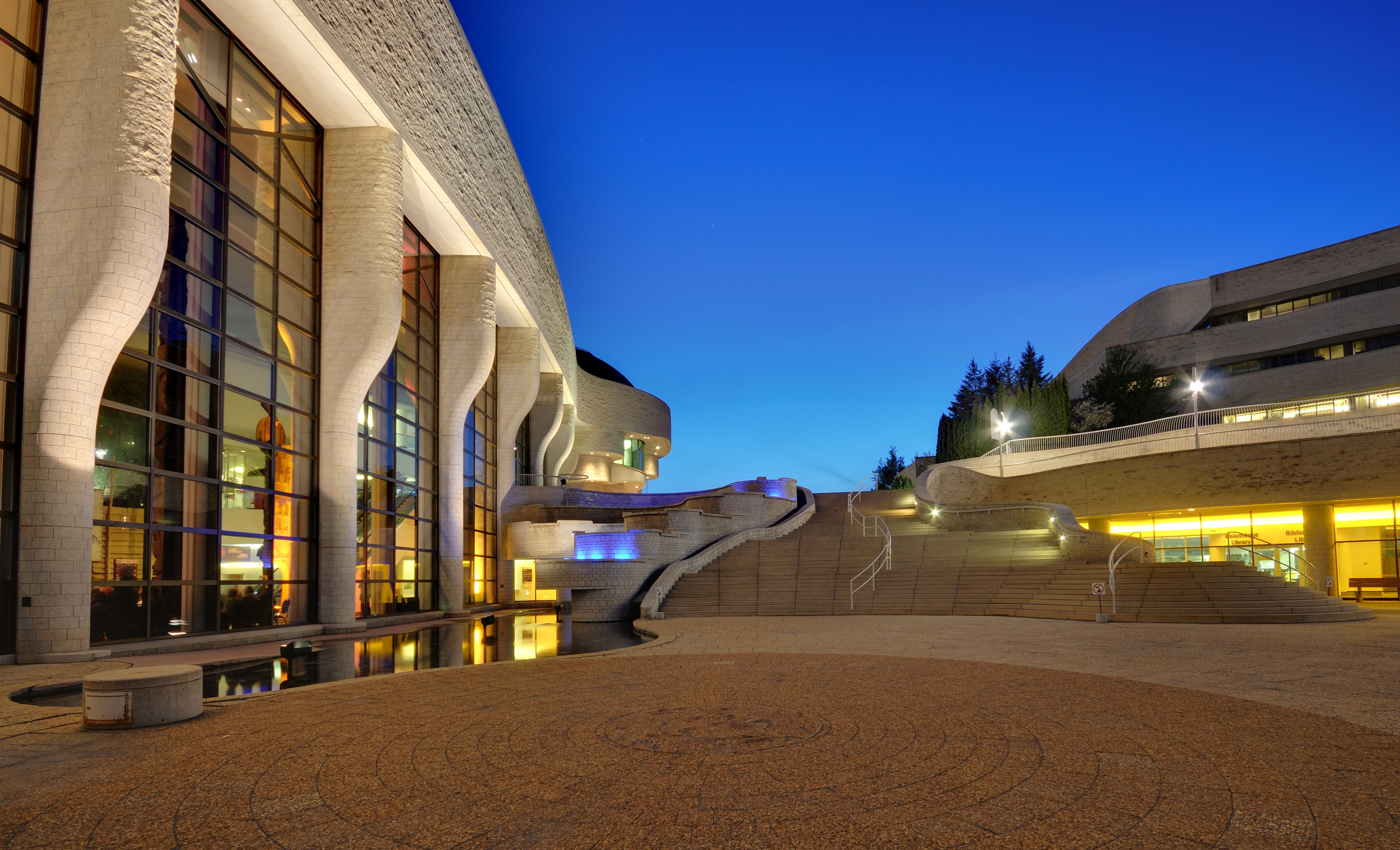
The museum's lower plaza. The staircase in the background leads to the museum's entrance plaza.

The site includes a museum building with two wings. The two wings wrap around and are connected by a large hemispherical entrance plaza which contains its food services, lounge, library, and underground parking. The parkland and open space between the two wings are intended to represent the "plains over which mankind migrated" over millennia. A large staircase east of the entrance plaza descends to the museum's lower plaza and gardens adjacent to the riverside park.

A pedestrian and cycling pathway is situated on the riverfront portion of the property, with the pathways continuing north into Jacques-Cartier Park, a municipal park north of the property.

=== Building ===
The 75,000 square metres (810,000 sq ft) structure was designed by Douglas Cardinal. The building's infrastructure includes approximately 56,000 square metres (600,000 sq ft) of concrete, and 7,300 tonnes of steel. Cardinal sought to create form a "sculptural icon" for the country, encouraged by then-prime minister, Pierre Trudeau, to develop a symbol that "enshrined our cultures". As a result, the building was the first structure in the National Capital Region that incorporates Indigenous architectural designs. Cardinal's design for the building was largely influenced by his understanding of how geography helped shaped Canada's history and culture.

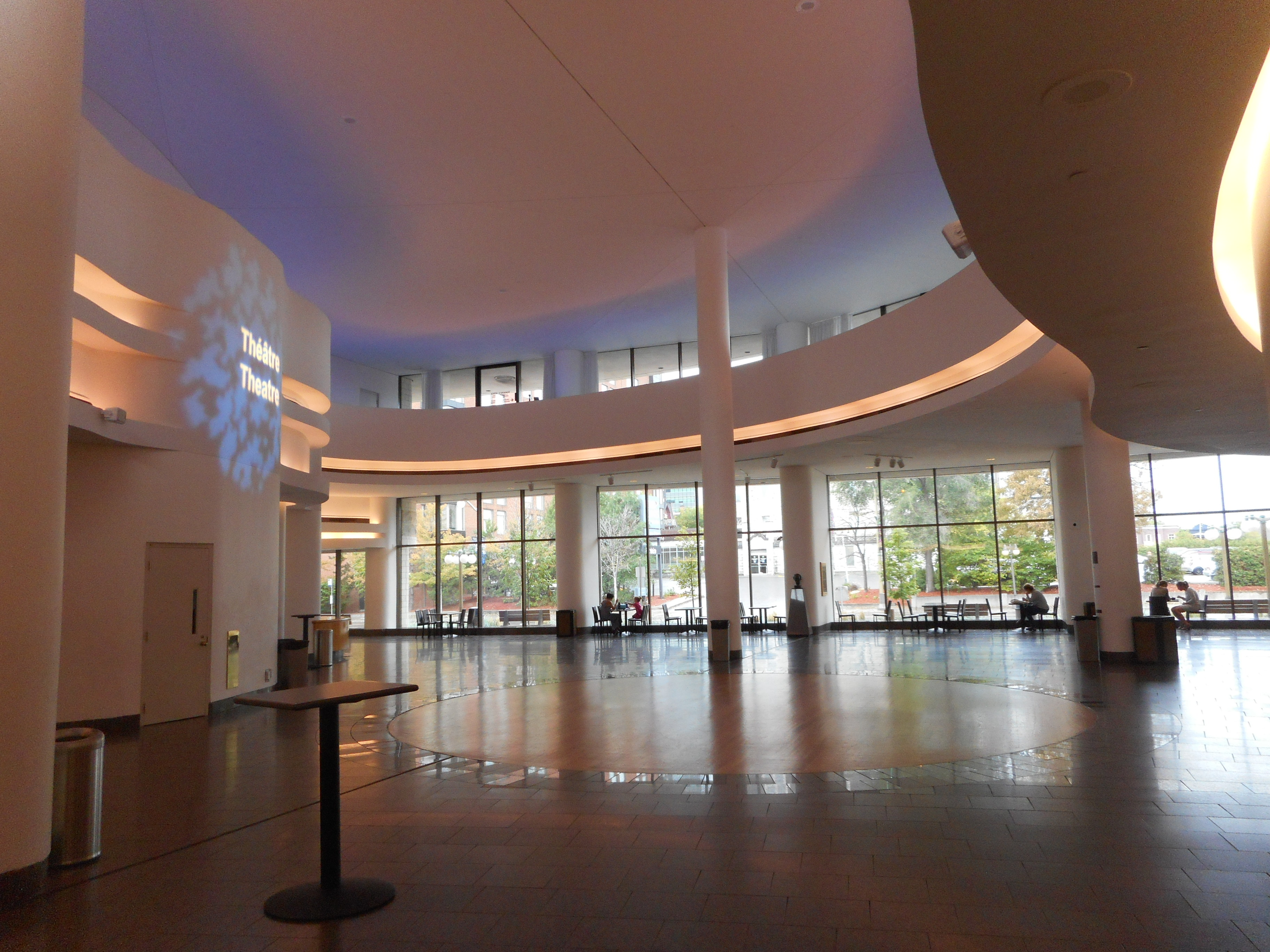
The atrium adjacent to the museum's theatre

The museum building has over 25,000 square metres (270,000 sq ft) of exhibition space, more than any other museum in Canada. In addition to exhibition space, the building also contains three restaurants, a boutique store, and two live performance theatres, including a 500-seat theatre for live performances. The building also has a 295-seat 3D theatre that uses a Barco digital projector. Before the installation of the Barco projector in 2016, the 3D theatre used a IMAX projector and was branded as an IMAX theatre.

Water is drawn from the Ottawa River to heat and cool the building. The building's energy needs are met by two substations in Gatineau, with two additional backup generators also available if both substations fail.

==== Exterior ====
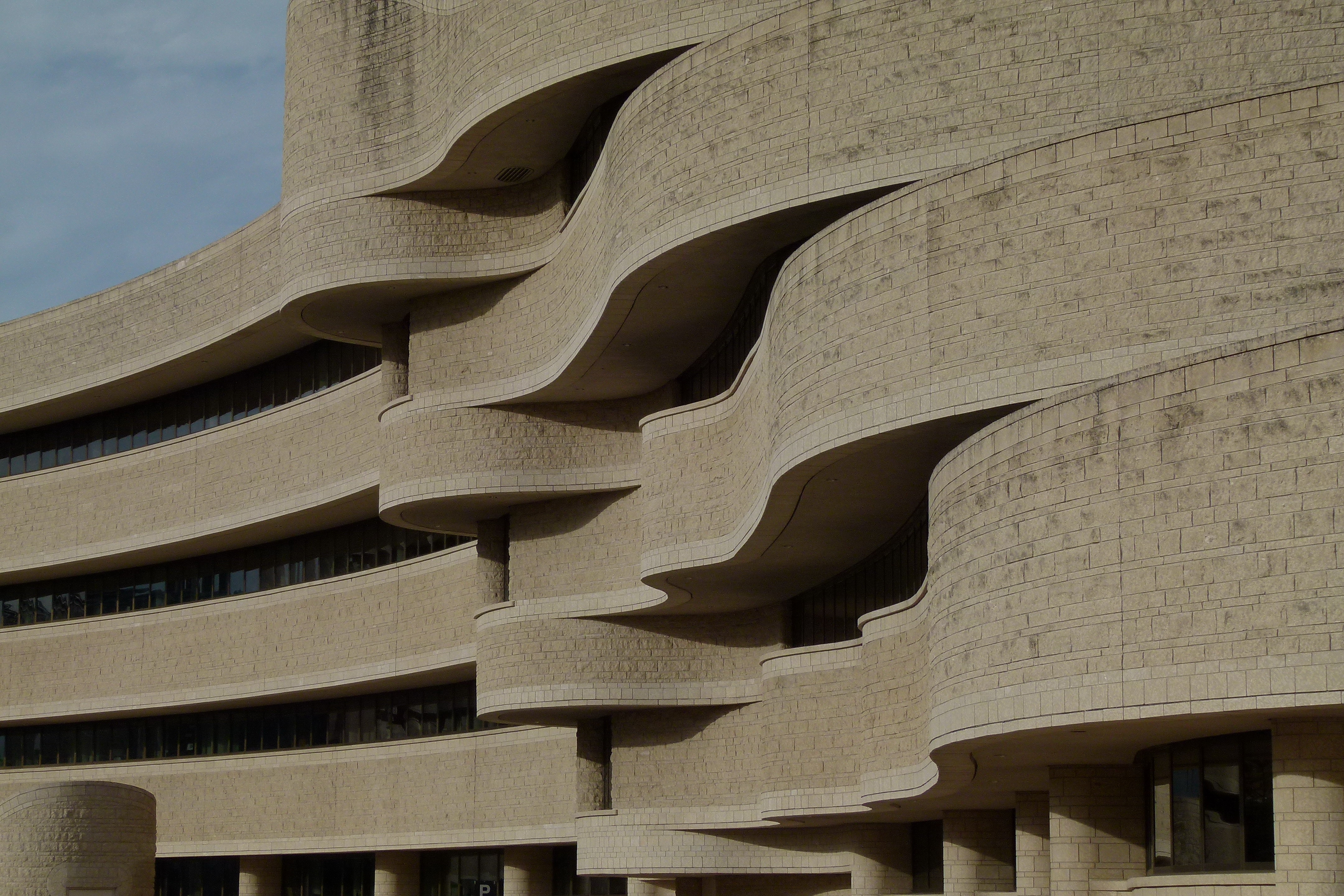
The building's exterior, clad with Tyndall stone

The building's exterior is clad with 30,000 square metres (320,000 sq ft) of Tyndall stone; with the material being selected because of its durability and its relationship with glaciers.

Cardinal sought to build a structure that appeared to be "flowing with the contours of the land," and simple lines and forms could be used to display the idea of movement. The building's design draws upon Art Nouveau styles to illustrate Canada's geography at the end of the Last Glacial Period when the landscape was largely uniform; with certain elements of the building evoking igloos earth lodges, and longhouses.

The building includes a cantilevered northern/curatorial wing and a southern wing that houses most of the museum's public facilities, including its galleries, and theatres. The curatorial wing was designed to evoke outcroppings of the Canadian Shield, while the southern public wing with its glass-fronted Grand Hall, was intended to evoke an image of a melting glacier. The southern wing's copper roof represents vegetation's recolonization of the lands once covered by glacial till. The copper roof is nearly 11,000 square metres (120,000 sq ft) and weighs approximately 90 tonnes. Both wings are curvaceous on their river sides to blend into their landscapes, although their street-side façade is more angular.

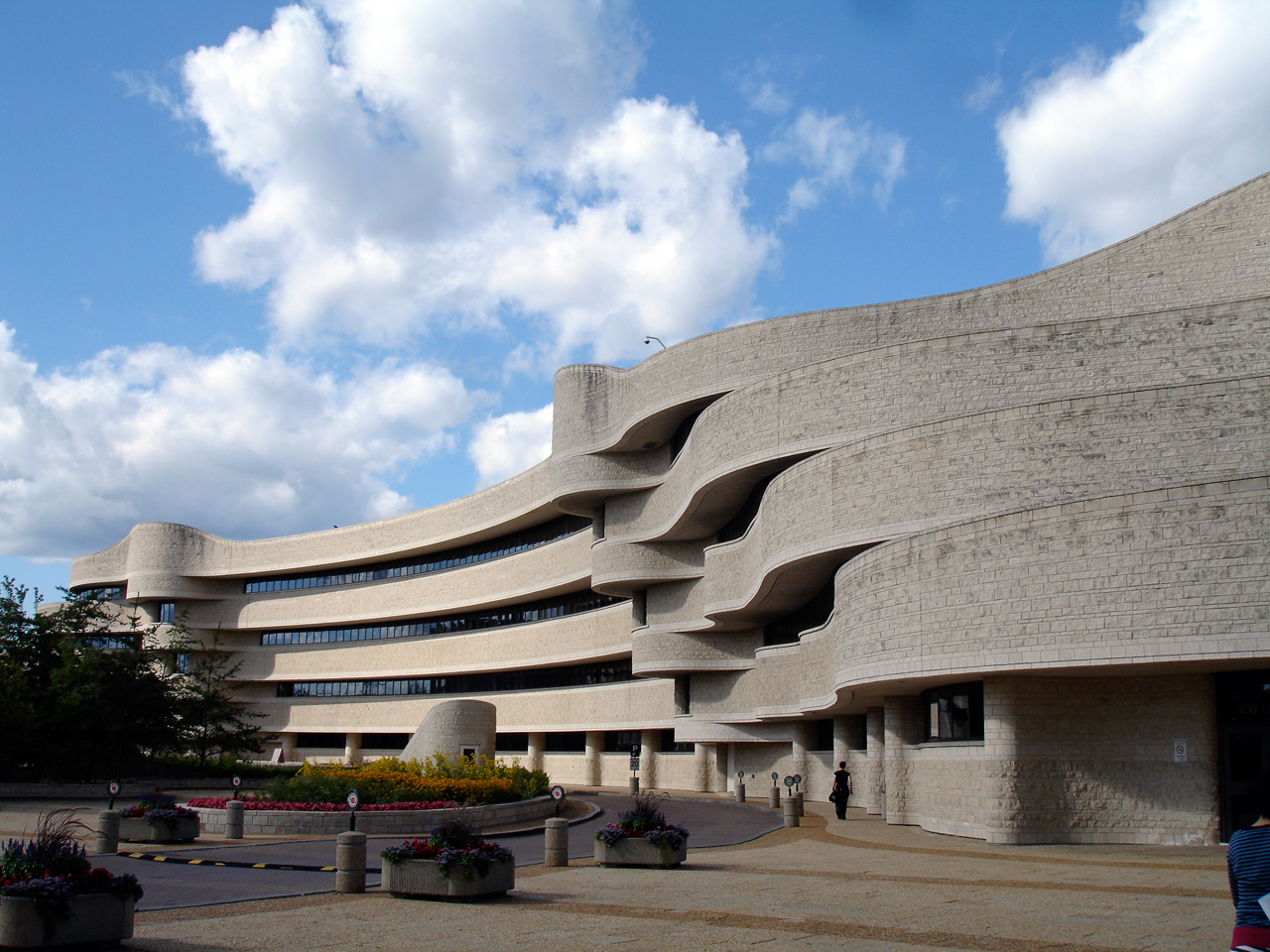
Curatorial/northern wing

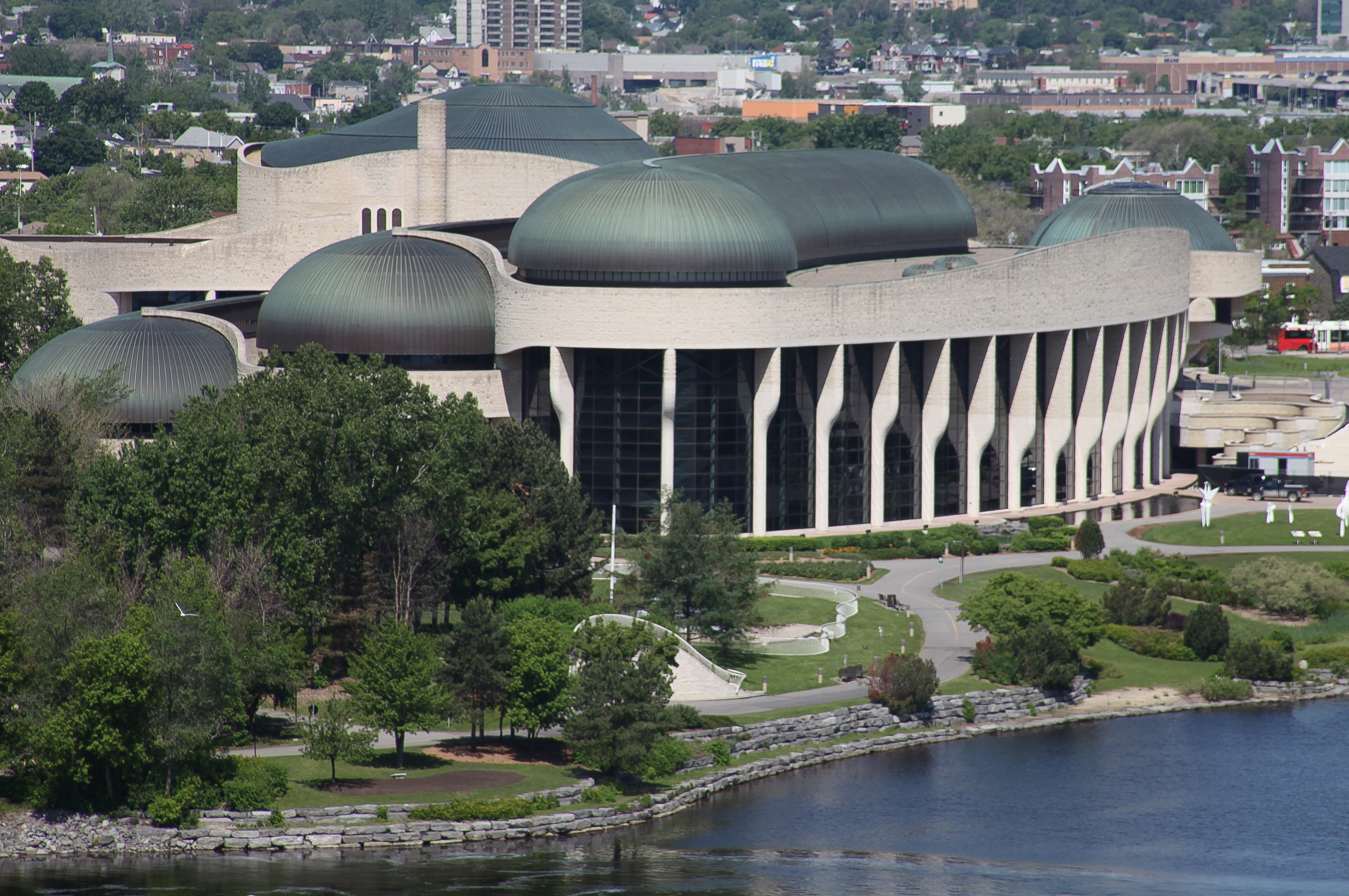
Southern wing

Exterior view of the museum

The NCC placed several restrictions on the building design, that the building does not obstruct the view of the Ottawa River, and that the building does not obstruct delineated "viewing cones" of Parliament Hill from the Gatineau side of the river. Because of these restrictions, the buildings were designed with a low-profile, to avoid obscuring the view for buildings across the street. From certain angles, the building appears as two separate pavilions, with an opening between these two sections providing an unobstructed view of Parliament Hill from Laurier Street. Considerations also needed to be taken to protect artifacts displayed in the building. Windows were triple-glazed and coated with a film that helps contain radiant heat and reduce solar ultraviolet rays, and the southern wing's Grand Hall was intentionally designed to face direct sunlight only in the morning.

The building was designed to create an "ever-changing pattern" of shadows across the structure's surface, with most of the building's exterior lighting kept below 30 lux to allow viewers to see deeper shadows at night.

== Exhibitions ==
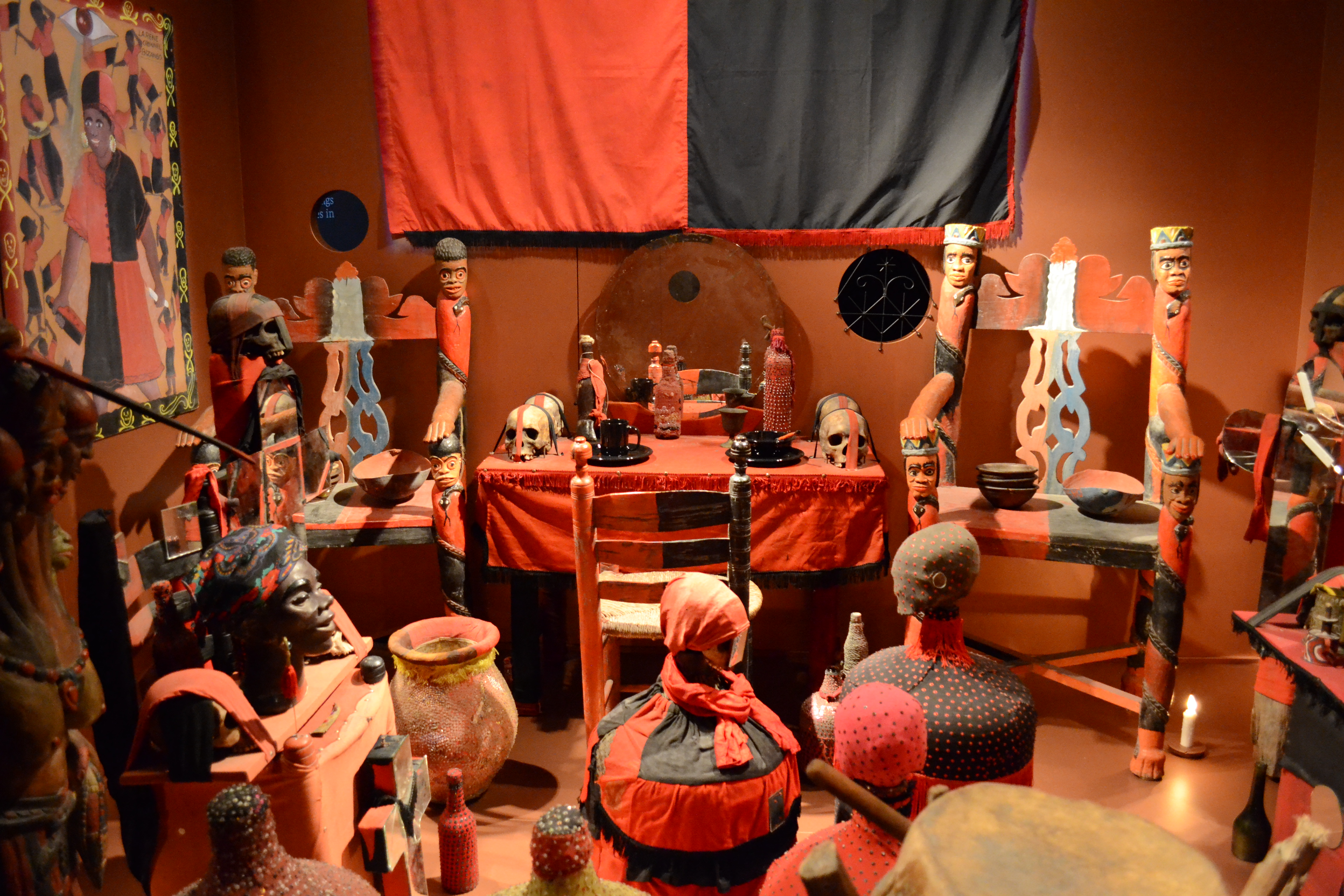
A temporary exhibition on Haitian Vodou at the museum in 2012

The museum hosts several permanent and temporary exhibitions on anthropology, ethnology, and history. Artifacts from the museum's collection are exhibited in these exhibitions. In addition, travelling exhibitions are occasionally held at the museum. The museum has also created several online exhibitions, like the Virtual Museum of New France.

Permanent exhibitions include First Peoples Hall, Canadian History Hall, the Canadian Children's Museum, the Canadian Stamp Collection, and two exhibitions on the Indigenous peoples of the Pacific Northwest Coast in the building's Grand Hall. First Peoples Hall is situated on the first floor of the building, whereas the Canada Hall is situated on the third level of the building. First Peoples Hall is situated next to the Grand Hall, with its exhibitions located on the ground floor.

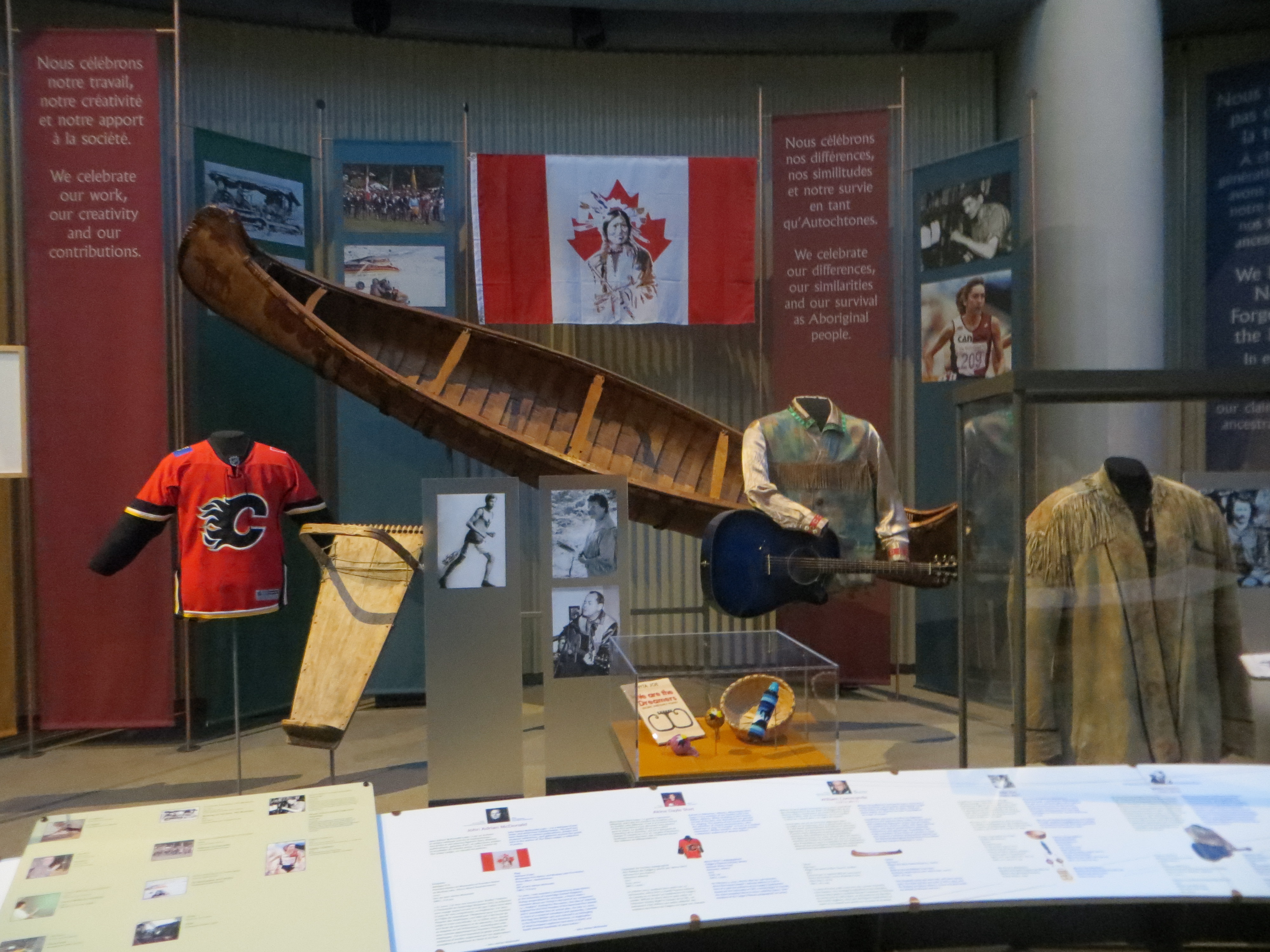
A Canadian History Hall exhibit that incorporates Indigenous topics in its content.

Many of the exhibits that were designed in the 1980s for the new building were influenced by the director of the museum, George F. MacDonald, his personal admiration for Pacific Northwest Coast art and culture, and the communication theories of his mentor, Marshall McLuhan. Merging exhibits detailing the Indigenous peoples of Canada with other Canadian historical exhibits were considered by the exhibition design team when plans were being made to move the museum in the 1980s. However, it was later decided to depict both topics as separate exhibitions, resulting in both exhibitions being planned by different teams with separate budgets. This decision was later reversed in 2017 when the museum reopened the Canadian History Hall exhibition with Indigenous exhibits incorporated throughout its exhibit.

=== First Peoples Hall ===
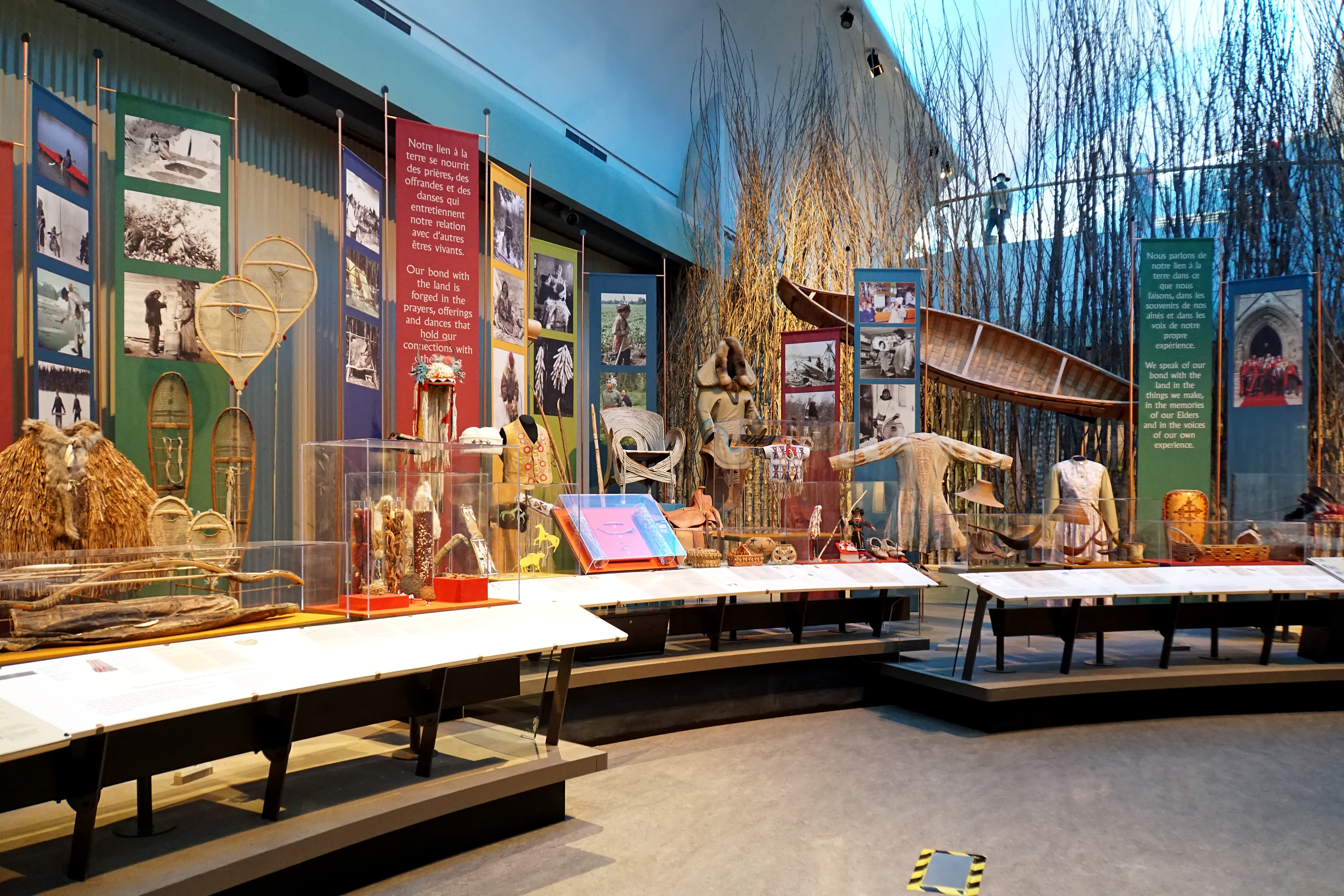
Exhibits at First Peoples Hall in 2018

First Peoples Hall is an exhibition opened in 2003, that explores Canada's First Nations, Inuit, and Métis peoples. The exhibition occupies 3,300 square metres (35,000 sq ft) of space on the ground floor of the building. The hall contains more than 2,000 objects on display. Most of the exhibition space is devoted to changing exhibits, to keep up with contemporary views on traditional cultures and current issues. However, First Peoples Hall does have some space devoted to long-term exhibits. These long-term exhibits explore topics that are less subject to changing interpretations; like ancient history, Indigenous languages, and the history of the relationship between Indigenous and European cultures. The exhibition is organized into several sections, such as the "Ways of Knowing", "An Ancient Bond with the Land", and "The Arrival of Strangers".

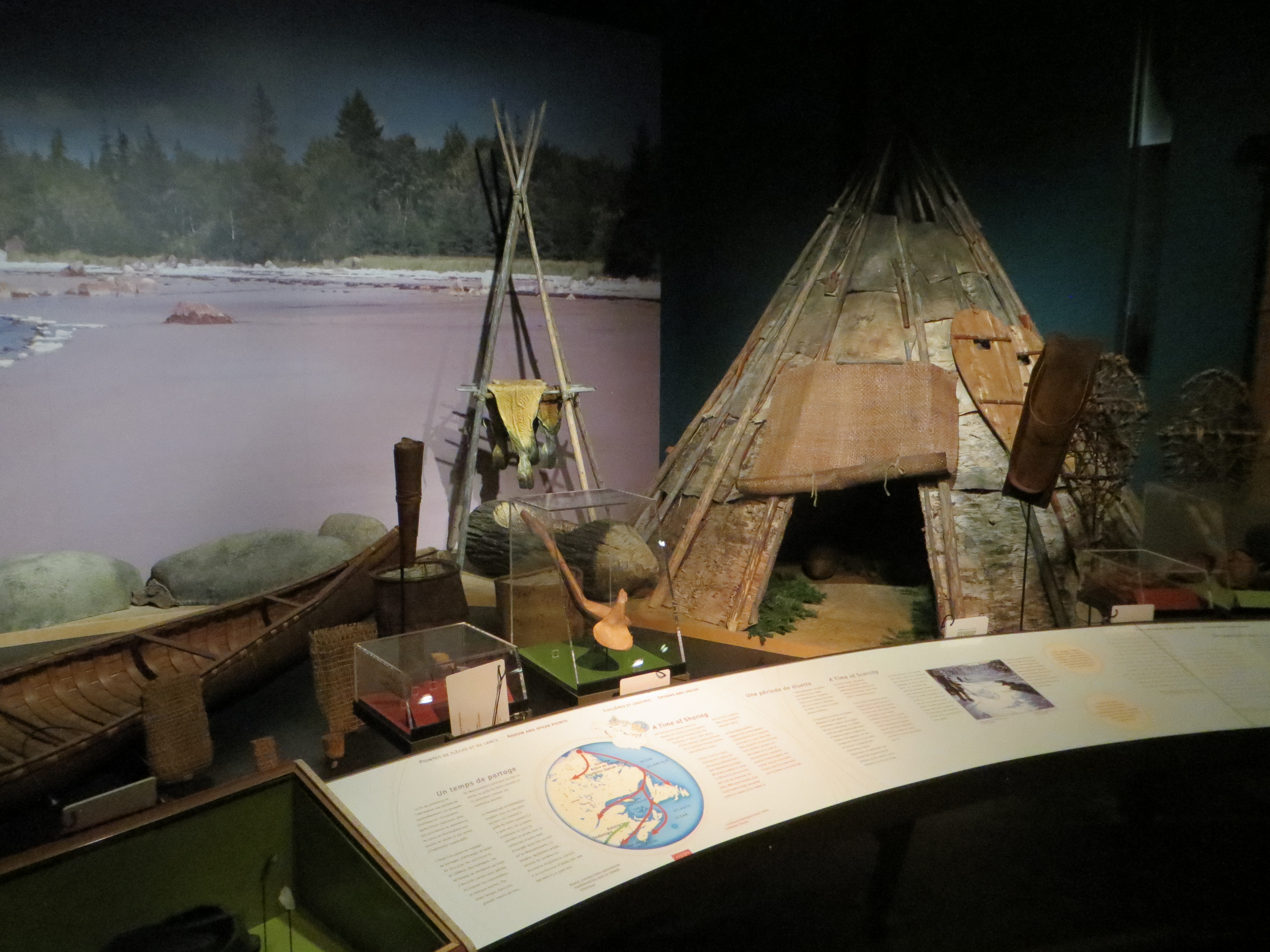
An exhibit in the "An Ancient Bond with the Land" section of First Peoples Hall

The exhibition was designed to "deconstruct and supersede" histories that visitors are familiar with. Exhibits were designed to address issues of stereotyping Indigenous identity, and the diversity and cultural distinctiveness between Indigenous nations; with many of the exhibits linking identity to Indigenous land claims in Canada. Additionally, exhibits were designed to portray Indigenous peoples as living peoples in the modern world. Archaeological exhibits in First Peoples Hall are themed to reinforce the fact that the Indigenous peoples of Canada have occupied the land since time immemorial, and that Canadian history has a long and complex history preceding European colonization. Additionally, many of these archaeological exhibits are designed to confront the notion of Eurasian technological supremacy at the time of first contact with the Americas. The exhibition concludes with contemporary issue exhibits, which explore recent clashes between Indigenous and non-Indigenous peoples in Canada over land and resources.

The curatorial model used to develop the exhibition conformed to the suggestions provided in the 1992 recommendations from the federal Task Force on Museums and First Peoples. The content and messaging of First Peoples Hall were determined in consultation with indigenous communities across Canada. Acting upon the task force's recommendation to establish partnerships with First Nation representatives whose cultures were being exhibited, an advisory committee of 15 Indigenous members was formed to help define the exhibition's thematic structure and messaging. As a result, exhibits in First Peoples Hall take a "multivocal" approach, where different perspectives can be distinguished within the exhibition; and explanatory fields like archaeology, ethnology and traditional Indigenous knowledge are juxtaposed, and contestatory with one another in some cases.

=== Canadian History Hall ===
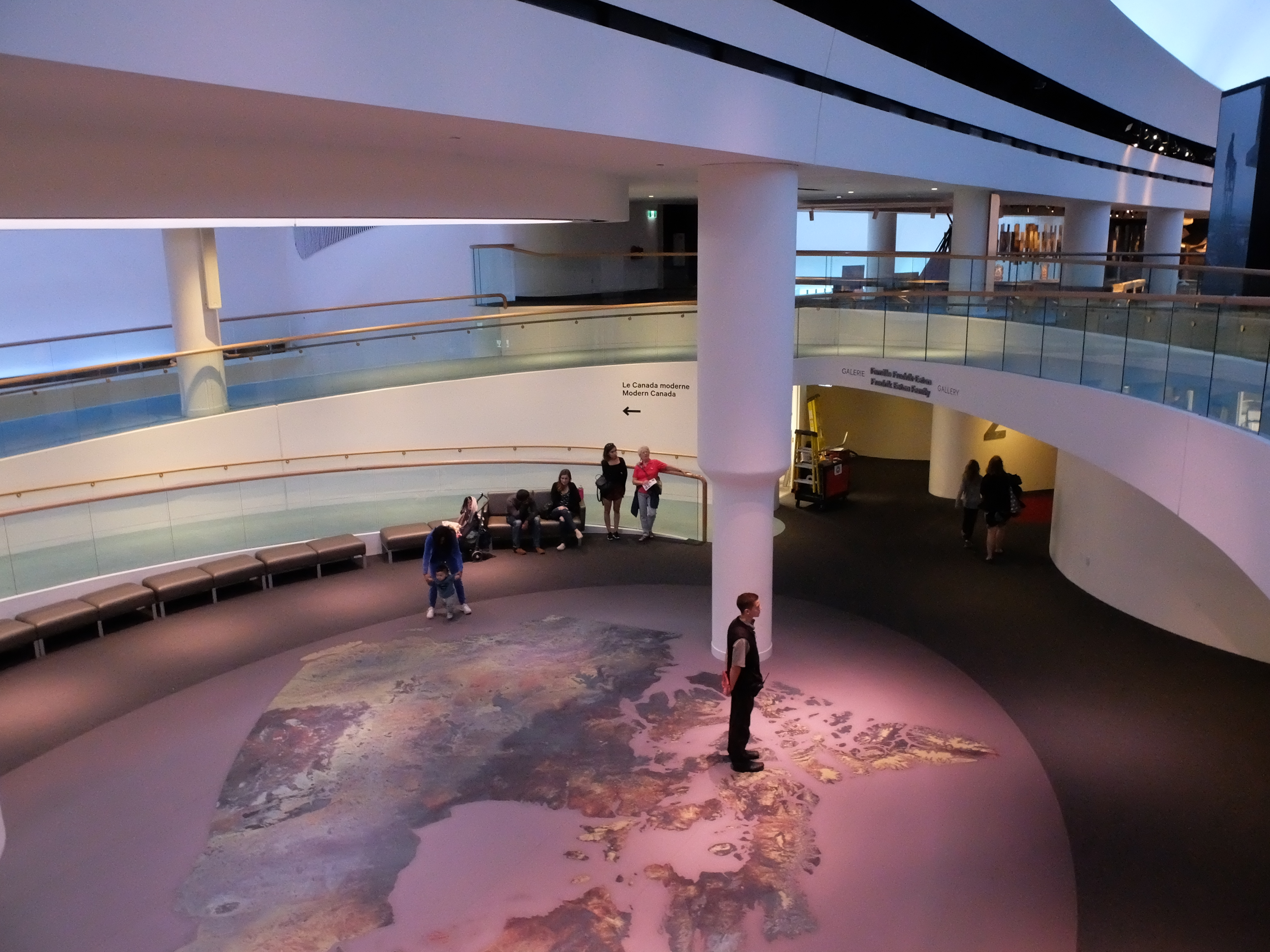
The entrance hub of Canadian History Hall, with a large map of Canada adorning its central area

Canadian History Hall is an exhibition that explores Canadian history. Canadian History Hall is approximately 4,690 square metres (50,500 sq ft), and includes over 14 projectors and 58 screens used in the exhibition. The exhibition includes three galleries and a long curved walkway that serves as the entrance to the three galleries. The entrance walkway is decorated with 101 silhouettes of Canadian cultural symbols and activities, as well as national landmarks. Canadian History Hall's galleries centre around a hub that was designed by Douglas Cardinal to resemble Chaudière Falls. The hub features a large 15.5 by 9.5 metres (51 ft × 31 ft) image of Canada on the floor. The image of Canada is made up of 121 satellite photos taken by the Canadian Space Agency, that were stitched together to form a single image.

The exhibition summarizes over 15,000 years of history and is divided into three era-centric galleries, Early Canada: From Earliest Times to 1763, Colonial Canada: 1763 to 1914, and Modern Canada: 1914 to the Present Day. The first two galleries are located on the same floor, while the third gallery occupies the mezzanine above the two galleries. The galleries are designed to showcase events and "turning points" in each respective era through the multimedia presentations and the artifacts on display. Each gallery is further organized into six separate "vignettes" that are thematically different, but interconnected with one another. The vignettes are primarily organized temporally, although some are specifically focused on a specific aspect of Canadian history. The exhibition takes a largely didactic approach with its subject and is particularly focused on the country's political and economic history, as well as the experience of Indigenous peoples. According to the exhibit team's head, David A. Morrison, Indigenous peoples and their relationship with newcomers will serve as an important overarching theme of Canadian History Hall.

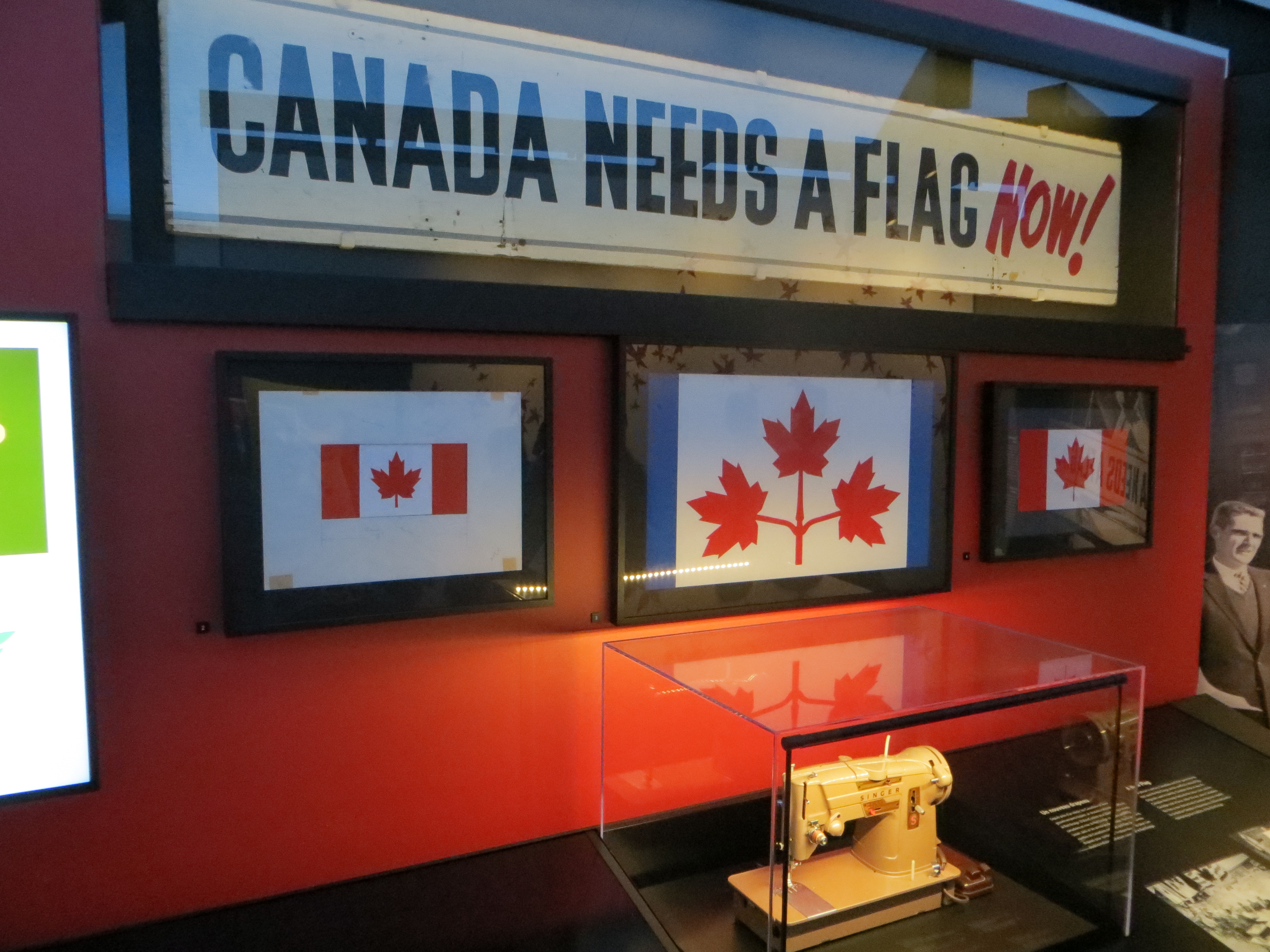
An exhibit on the Great Canadian flag debate in Canadian History Hall, with the sewing machine Joan O'Malley used to sew the first Maple Leaf flag on display.

Early Canada explores provides a summary of Indigenous history prior to the arrival of the Europeans as well as early Canadian colonies like New France. The gallery includes Indigenous artifacts, narrative recounts of Indigenous interactions between Norse, English and French explorers, and detailed accounts on the North American fur trade, the spread of disease within Indigenous populations, and the Beaver Wars. Colonial Canada explores Canada under British rule since the conquest of New France, as well as post-Confederation Canada to 1914. Modern Canada explores Canada's recent history, up to the arrival of Syrian refugees in the 2010s. The latter two galleries provide detailed histories on the Seven Years' War, treaties signed between various Indigenous groups and the Crown, the push for responsible government, Canadian Confederation, the world wars, the Canadian Indian residential school system, Quebec nationalism, and multiculturalism in Canada.

There are over 1,500 artifacts on display in Canadian History Hall. Historic artifacts include a 3,600 to 3,900 years old ivory carving believed to be the oldest representation of a human face found in Canada; James Wolfe's coat; and handcuffs worn by Louis Riel prior to his execution; Maurice Richard's hockey jersey; Terry Fox's T-shirt; Tommy Douglas's hat; the table on which the proclamation of the Constitution Act, 1982 was signed by Queen Elizabeth II in 1982; Randy Bachman's guitar, and the sewing machine which Joan O'Malley sewed the first Maple Leaf flag. There are 40 linear films shown at the exhibition, including Origin Stories, a film that illustrates how the Anishinaabe believed the earth was formed. Origin Stories is displayed along the curved wall of the Canadian History Hall's entrance.

The modular structure of the exhibits enables the museum to swap segments easier. The number of exhibits in the galleries may also expand, with the museum having reserved enough space to allow for the addition of new exhibits in the three galleries.

==== Pre-2017 exhibition ====
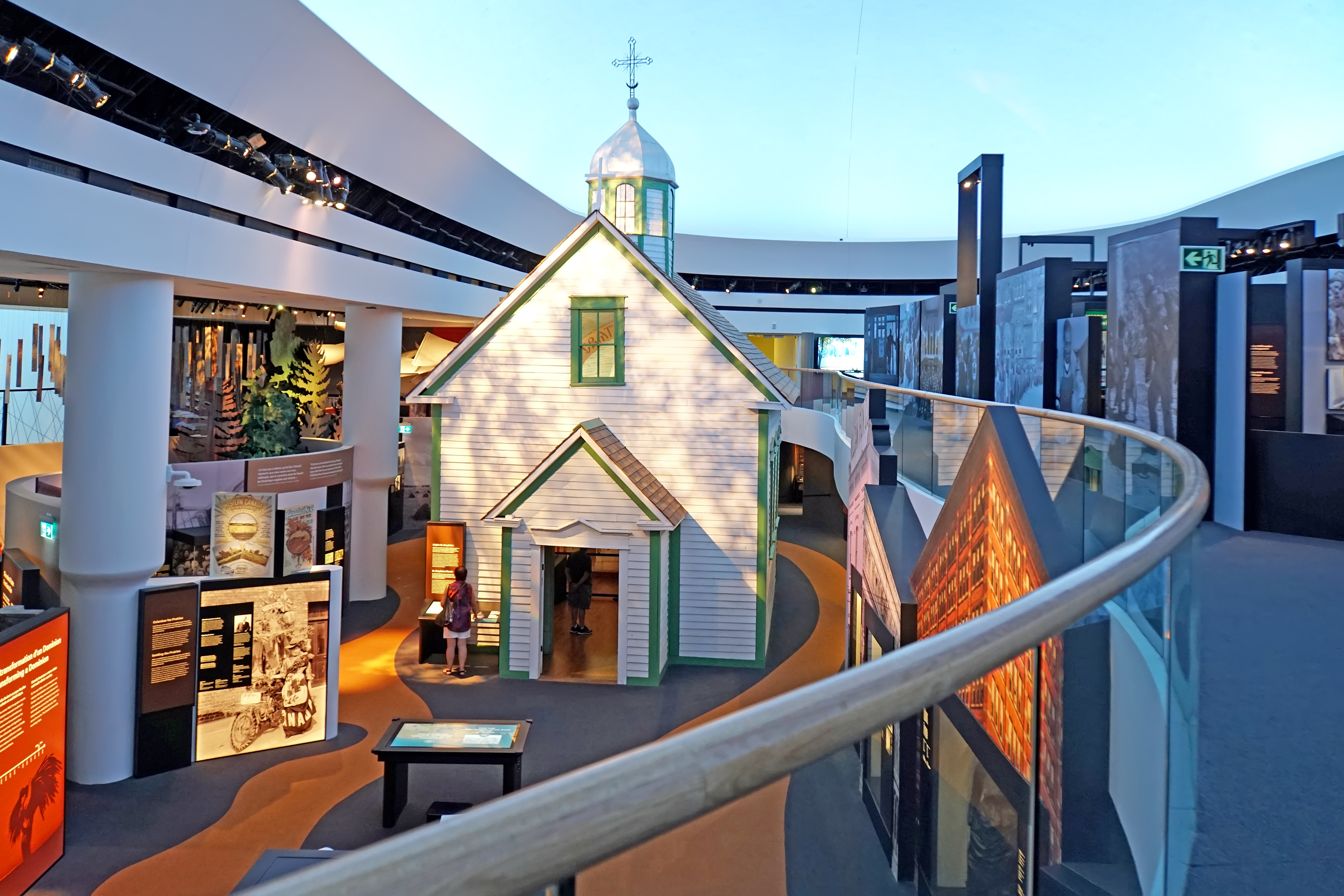
St. Onuphrius Church in Canadian History Hall in 2018. The early-20th-century Ukrainian church is the only remaining life-sized diorama from the former Canada Hall exhibit.

Canadian History Hall's predecessor, Canada Hall, opened as an inaugural exhibit at the museum in 1989. The original exhibition was divided into 23 modules that were arranged chronologically, beginning with the Norse colonization of North America. The gallery aimed to promote Canadian multiculturalism, having portrayed a social history that depicted a "march of immigrants" from east to west, and the success of different groups in Canada. However, these modules provided little in-depth consideration for pre-colonial Indigenous cultures, which were only explored in the museum's other exhibitions prior to Canada Hall's updates in the 2010s. The original design of Canada Hall recreated historical settings with period rooms and full-scale historical buildings incorporated into the exhibition; reflecting McLuhan's theories, and innovations adopted by entertainment pavilions like Disney's Epcot.

Canada Hall was closed to the public in September 2014 to enable renovations and significant updates to the exhibition. The exhibition reopened in 2017 significantly changed from its original design. Nearly all of the life-sized dioramas were dismantled as a part of the exhibition's update. St. Onuphrius Church, an original early-20th-century Ukrainian church from the Canadian Prairies that was later relocated to the museum, is the only remaining life-sized diorama in the exhibition.

=== Canadian Children's Museum ===
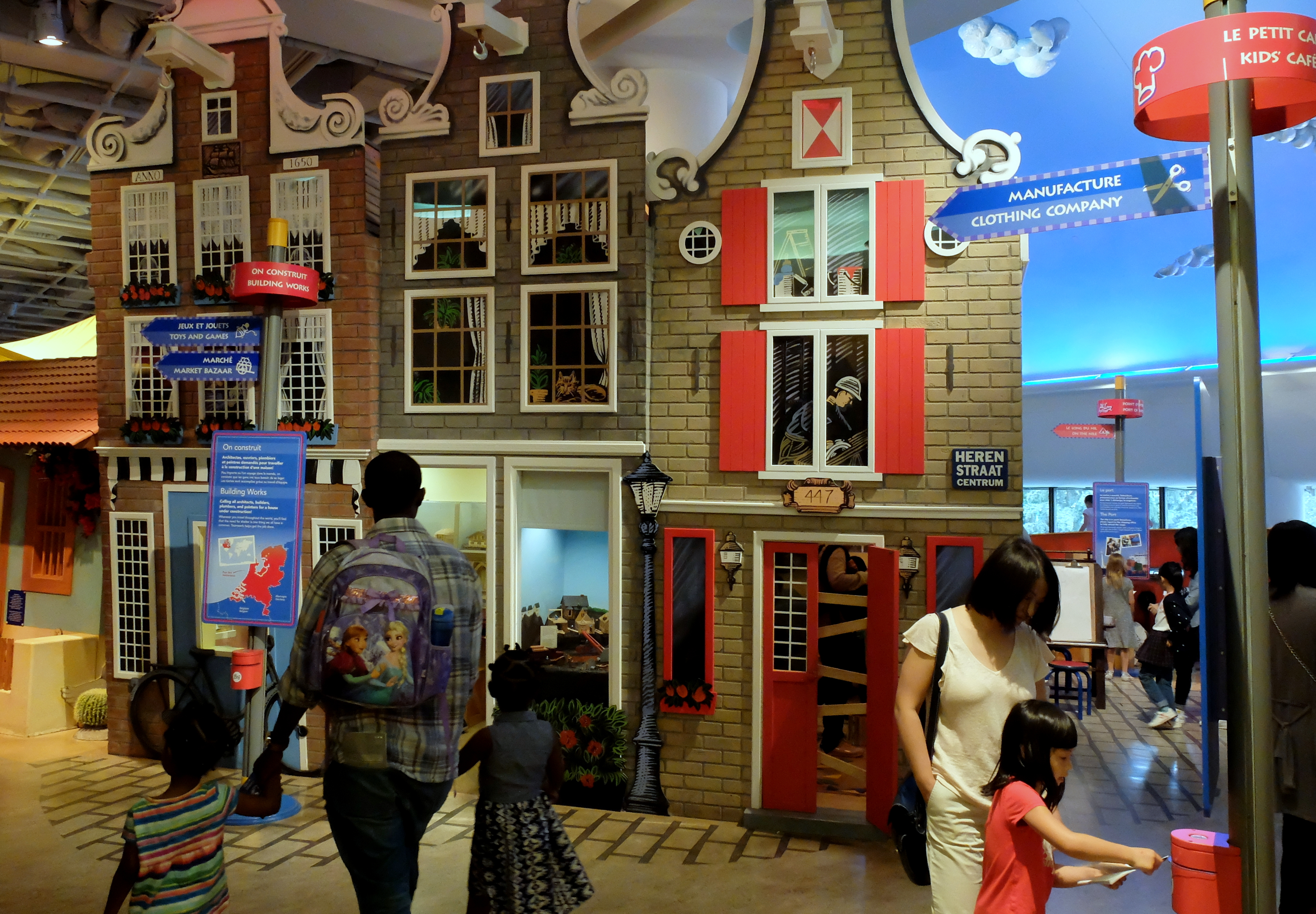
Exhibits at the Canadian Children's Museum

The Canadian Children's Museum is Canada's largest exhibition centre designed specifically for children with over 3,000 square metres (32,000 sq ft) of space. The museum uses more than 15,000 artifacts, props, and hands-on items for use in its exhibitions and programs. These items include art, clothing, games, photographs, and toys. The museum includes an International Village, as well as Canadian-themed attractions that were added into the exhibition in 2007.

In 2018, the museum announced it would undertake a renewal project in January 2020. The museum announced the revamp would reflect how children play and learn, and will remove more dated exhibits from the exhibition, like the post office and telephone booth. It reopened in May 2022.

=== Canadian Stamp Collection ===
The Canadian Stamp Collection is a stamp collection of more than 3,000 stamps and includes every Canadian stamp issued since 1851. The stamp collection was housed at the Canadian Postal Museum until 2012 when the postal museum closed and its stamp collection relocated to the Canadian Museum of History. The Canadian Museum of History opened a permanent exhibition for the collection in 2014 in partnership with Canada Post. Stamps that are exhibited in the exhibition are showcased with artifacts that either inspired its creation or were used to make the stamp.

=== Grand Hall exhibitions ===
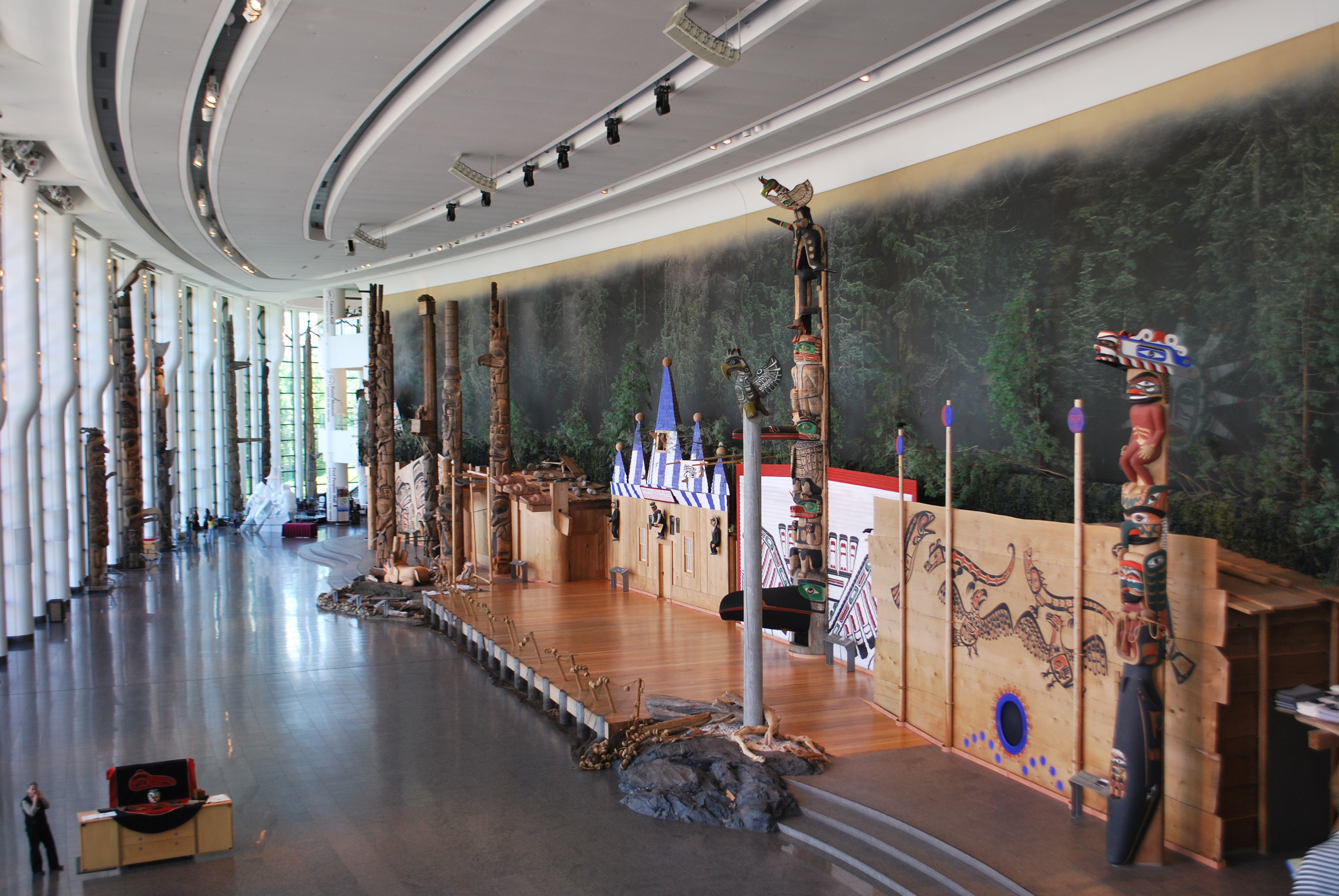
Exhibitions in the Grand Hall

Grand Hall features two permanent exhibitions on the Indigenous peoples of the Pacific Northwest Coast, First Peoples of the Northwest Coast and From Time Immemorial — Tsimshian Prehistory. The exhibits include totem poles and other artifacts. The exhibitions were developed as a collaboration between the museum's curators and Indigenous cultural specialists in the 1980s.

In 1993, a large mural titled Morning Star was added to the domed ceiling of the Grand Hall. The mural was created by Alex Janvier and is symbolic of Indigenous life and history. In addition to the two permanent exhibitions, the Grand Hall is also used to host other major events. In addition to its permanent exhibitions, the Grand Hall has also been used to host temporary exhibitions.

== Collections ==
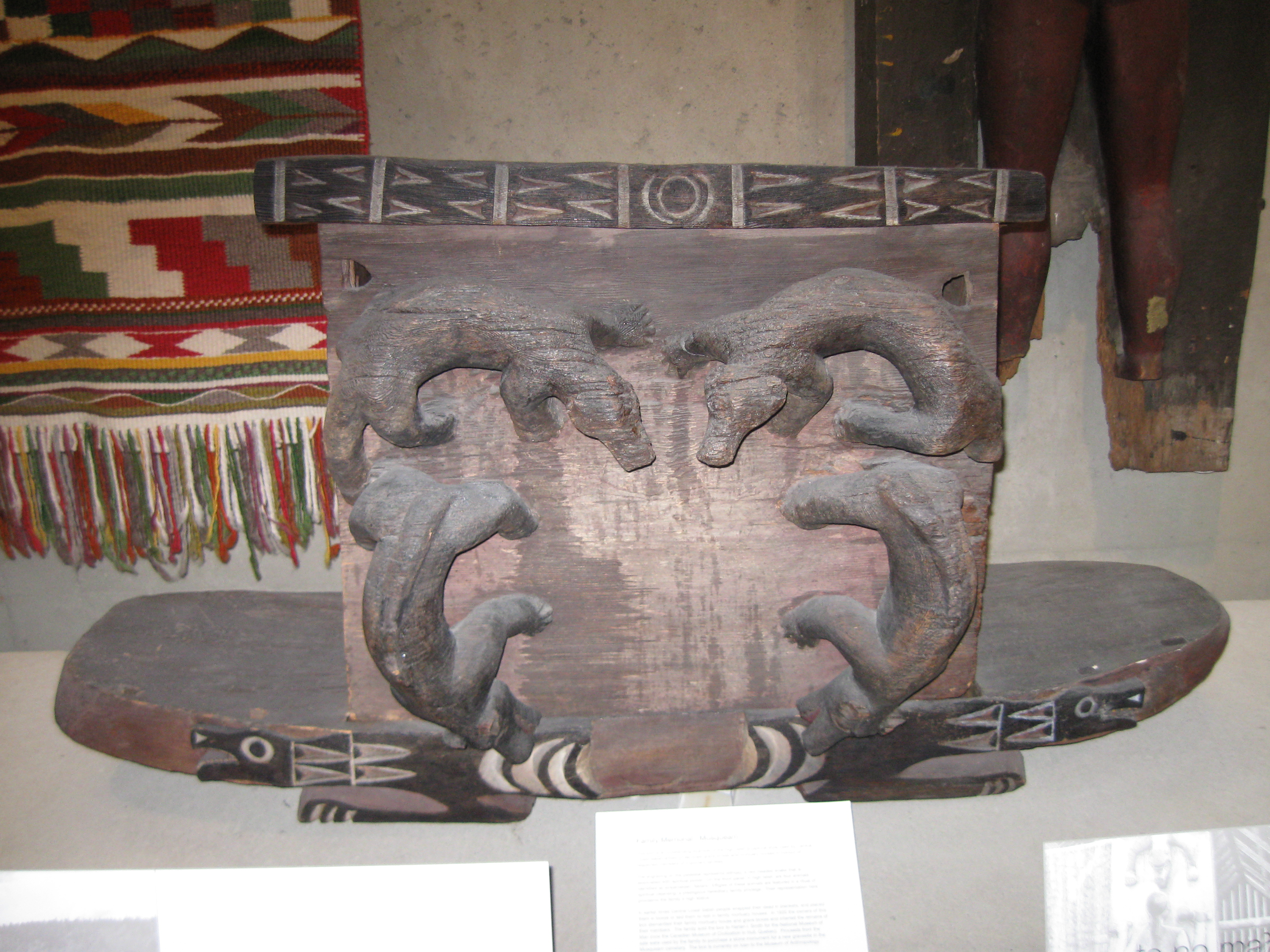
A Coast Salish funerary box from museum's collection

As of June 2021, the Canadian Museum of History's permanent collection includes more than three million artifacts, documents, works of art, and other specimens. This includes over one million photographs, 72,000 sound recordings and 18,000 films and videotapes. The collection takes up approximately 4 kilometres (2.5 mi) of shelf space. Approximately 218,000 artifacts have been digitized and made accessible online by the museum.

The museum's permanent collection dates back to the collection established by the Geological Survey of Canada in the 1860s. The museum's collection of artifacts has expanded through the institution's research programs. The first collection representing Indigenous peoples was established by the Geological Survey of Canada, with other parts of the collection having been acquired by government officials and missionaries working outside Ottawa. The collection continued to expand after the anthropology department was established in 1910, and the museum began a systematic program of documenting Indigenous cultures and lineages.

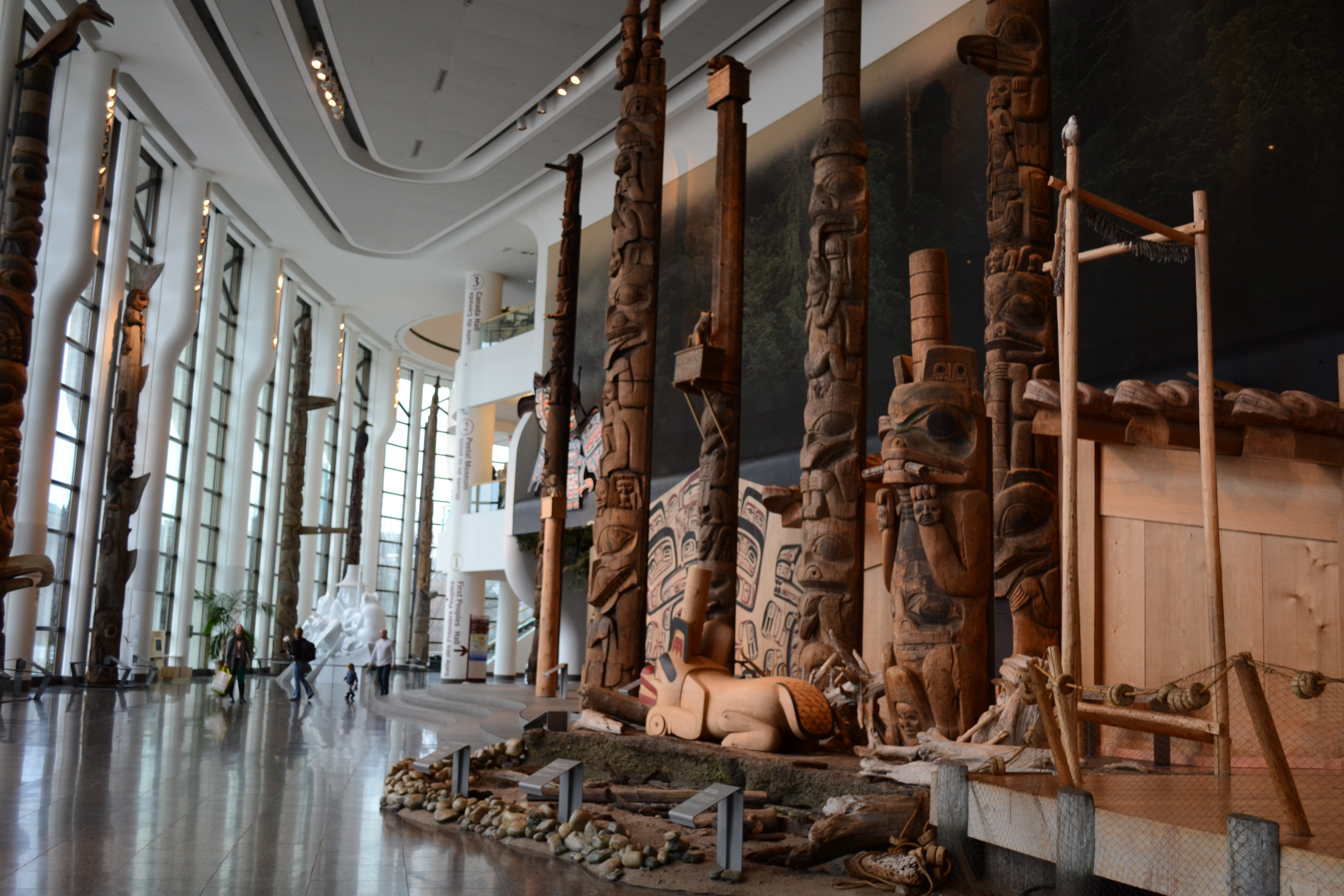
Totem poles on exhibit in the Grand Hall

The museum's collection of Indigenous items is the largest in Canada and is the only major collection with a national scope in the country. The museum also possesses the world's largest collection of totem poles. The Sacred Materials Project was created by the museum to help maintain Indigenous sacred items, and facilitate the repatriation of select items to their respective communities. The project provides funds for Indigenous representatives to view the museum's collections and discuss the repatriation of identified sacred items, as well as identify other objects in the collection that require ritualistic care.

The museum's permanent collection contains several smaller collections, like the Windfield Farm Collection. The Windfield Farm Collection was acquired by the museum in 2013 and contains documents, photographs, memorabilia and trophies, including the Kentucky Derby trophy won by Northern Dancer. The museum's collection of flags is also the largest in the country.

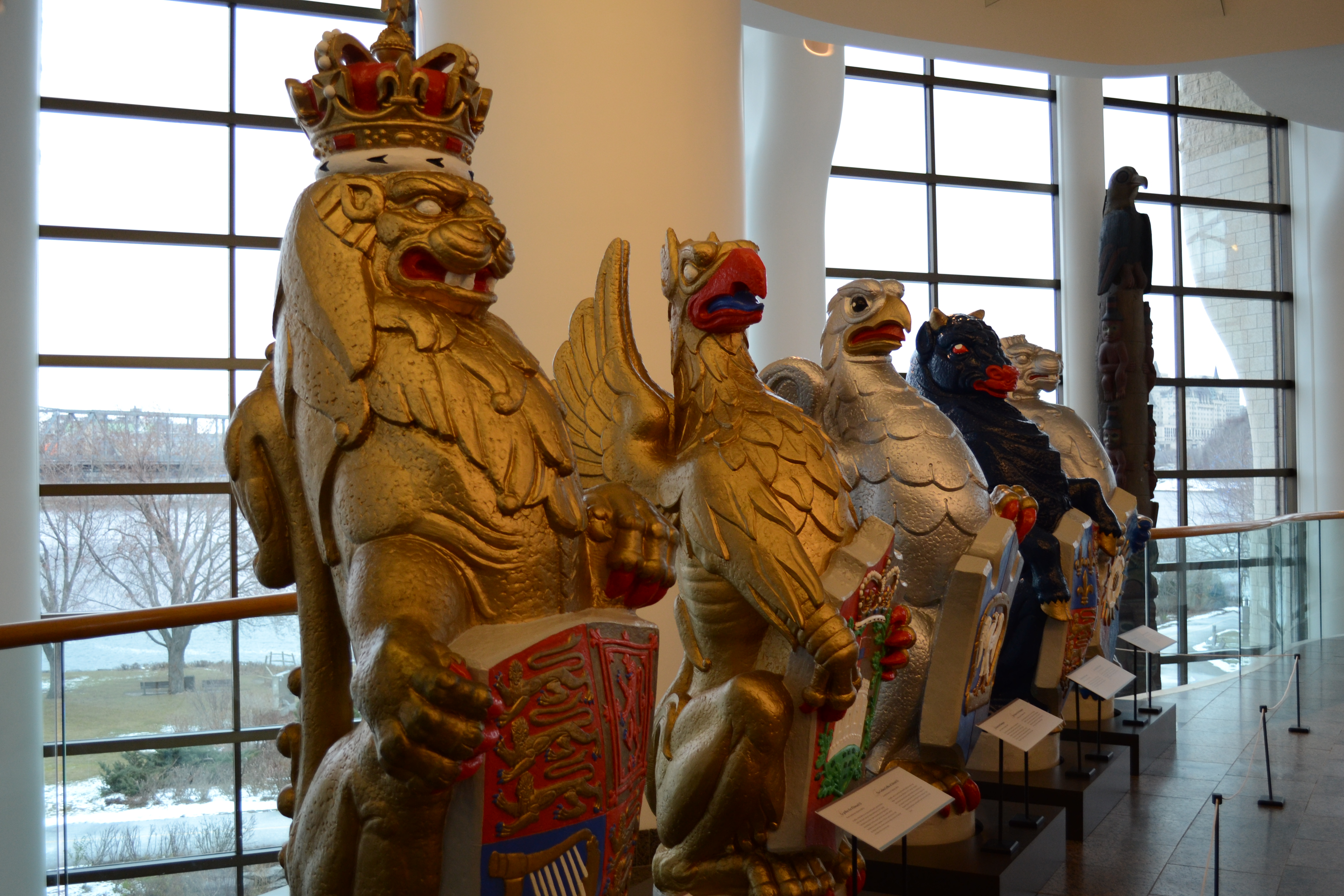
The Queen's Beasts are heraldic sculptures in the museum's collection

Other notable items in the museum's permanent collection includes a Contempra phone, the first telephone to be designed and manufactured in Canada; cough syrup from the 1918 influenza pandemic; the original plaster for Bill Reid's Spirit of Haida Gwaii; ten large heraldic sculptures known as The Queen's Beasts; and royal gown worn by Elizabeth II during her royal tours of Canada. The museum also contains a number of ice hockey artifacts, including game-used National Hockey League sticks, hockey cards, and the world's oldest existing ice hockey stick. The ice hockey stick dates back to the mid-1830s and was acquired by the museum in 2015 for $300,000.

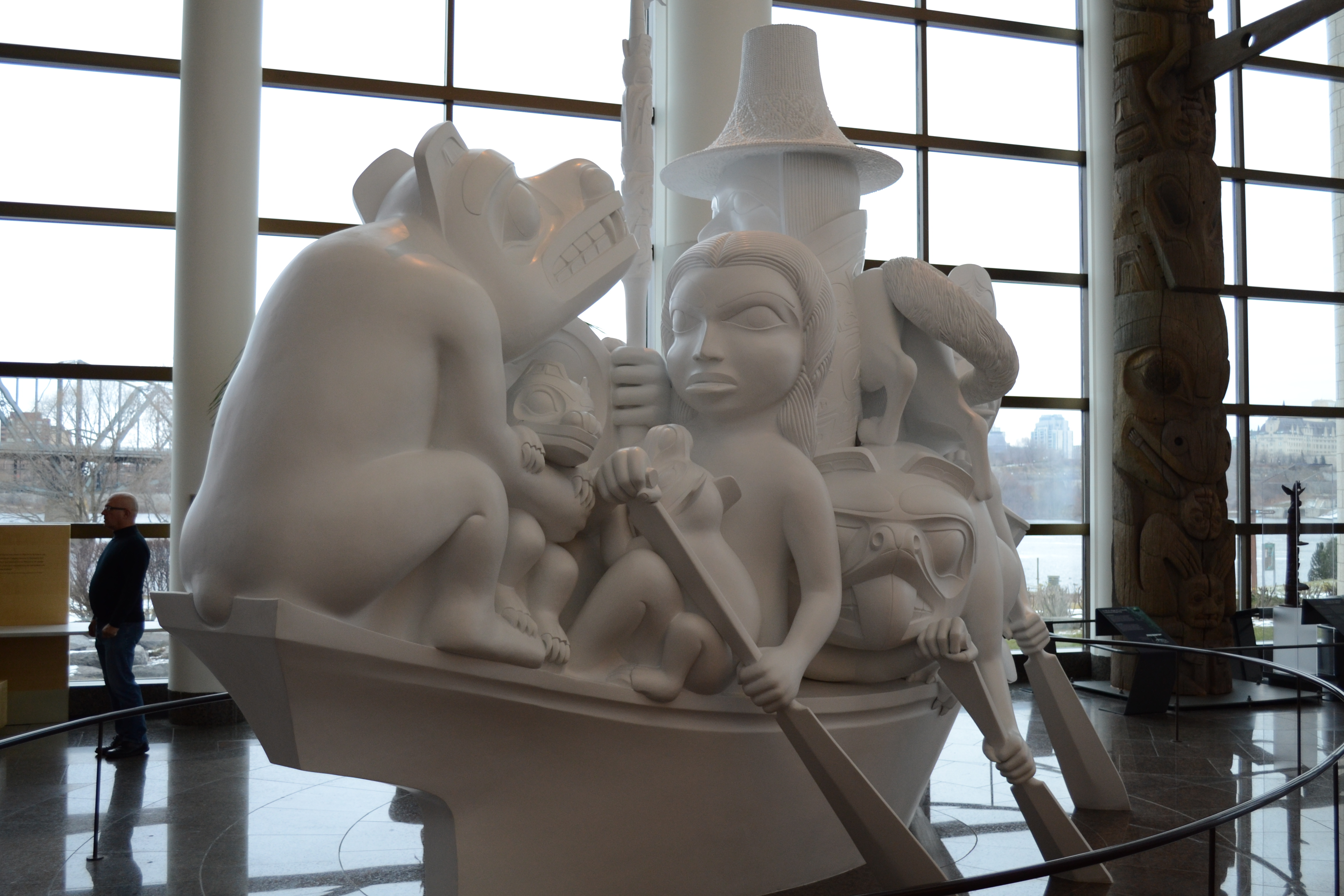
The original plaster for the Spirit of Haida Gwaii by Bill Reid, on display in the museum's Grand Hall

In addition to its permanent collection, the Canadian Museum of History also co-manages collections with other institutions. In July 1999, the museum entered an agreement with the Canadian Nursing Association (CNA), the Canadian War Museum, and the National Archives of Canada to create the Canadian Nursing History Collection. This collection includes over 9,000 photographs, 1,600 audiovisual materials, and over 35 metres (115 ft) of textual records from the CNA, the Nursing Sisters Association of Canada, and the Helen Mussallem Collection. Approximately 950 documented artifacts from this collection are deposited at the Canadian Museum of History. Items from the collection at the Canadian Museum of History include 167 nurses' caps, dating from 1895 to 1983. In June 2005, the museum opened a temporary exhibition that focused on this collection. In 2021, the Canadian Museum of History entered into an agreement to house and maintain artifacts from Canada's Sports Hall of Fame.

=== Library and archives ===
The museum's resource centre operates a library and archives. As of 2015, the museum's library has more than 60,000 books, over 2,000 journals and magazines, and over 1,000 DVDs, CDs, and video tapes. The museum's rare and old books collection includes Paul-Émile Borduas's Refus Global (1948) and Pierre François Xavier de Charlevoix's Histoire et description générale de la Nouvelle-France (1744).

=== Research ===
The museum's collection is used to support research in anthropology, archaeology, Indigenous people in Canada, linguistics, material culture, multicultural communities, social and political history and museology in Canada. The museum also publishes its own academic journal, the Mercury Series; on history, archaeology, and anthropology. The journal has been published in partnership with the University of Ottawa Press since 2012. The museum has also published the academic journal Material Culture Review in partnership with the Canada Science and Technology Museum since the 1970s. The journal provides a forum for research on historical artifacts collected by Canadian museums.

== Management ==
Canadian Museum of History
- Musée canadien de l'histoire

Corporation overview
- Formed: June 1, 1990; 36 years ago
- Preceding Corporation: National Museums of Canada Corporation
- Headquarters: Gatineau, Quebec
- Minister responsible: Steven Guilbeault, Minister of Canadian Heritage
- Parent department: Canadian Heritage
- Key documents: Museums Act; Canadian Museum of History Act

The Canadian Museum of History is managed by a federal Crown corporation of the same name under the Department of Canadian Heritage's portfolio. The museum is one of two national museums managed by the corporation, the other being the Canadian War Museum. The corporation also administers the Virtual Museum of New France, a virtual museum and online exhibition of the Canadian Museum of History; and the Virtual Museum of Canada, an administrative program that supports the development of online projects for museums and heritage organizations across Canada. The Virtual Museum of Canada was an online portal for virtual exhibits in Canada until 2020, when the Virtual Museum of Canada's website was decommissioned, and the project was reoriented into a support program.

Management of the corporation is conducted through an 11-member board of trustees. Trustees are appointed by the Minister of Canadian Heritage, with approval from the Governor-in-Council. In turn, the board appoints the corporation's president and chief executive officer. The corporation reports to the Parliament of Canada through the Minister of Canadian Heritage. The corporation's mandate is defined under the Museums Act.

The corporation was established as the Canadian Museum of Civilization in June 1990 through the Museums Act; an Act that was later amended in 2014. The corporation adopted its current name in 2013. The Crown corporation was one of several that succeeded the defunct National Museums of Canada Corporation, a Crown corporation that managed most of the country's national museums until its dissolution in 1988.

== See also ==
- List of museums in Ottawa
- List of museums with major collections in ethnography and anthropology
- National museums of Canada
