= Peter Rolston =

Canadian politician (1937-2006)

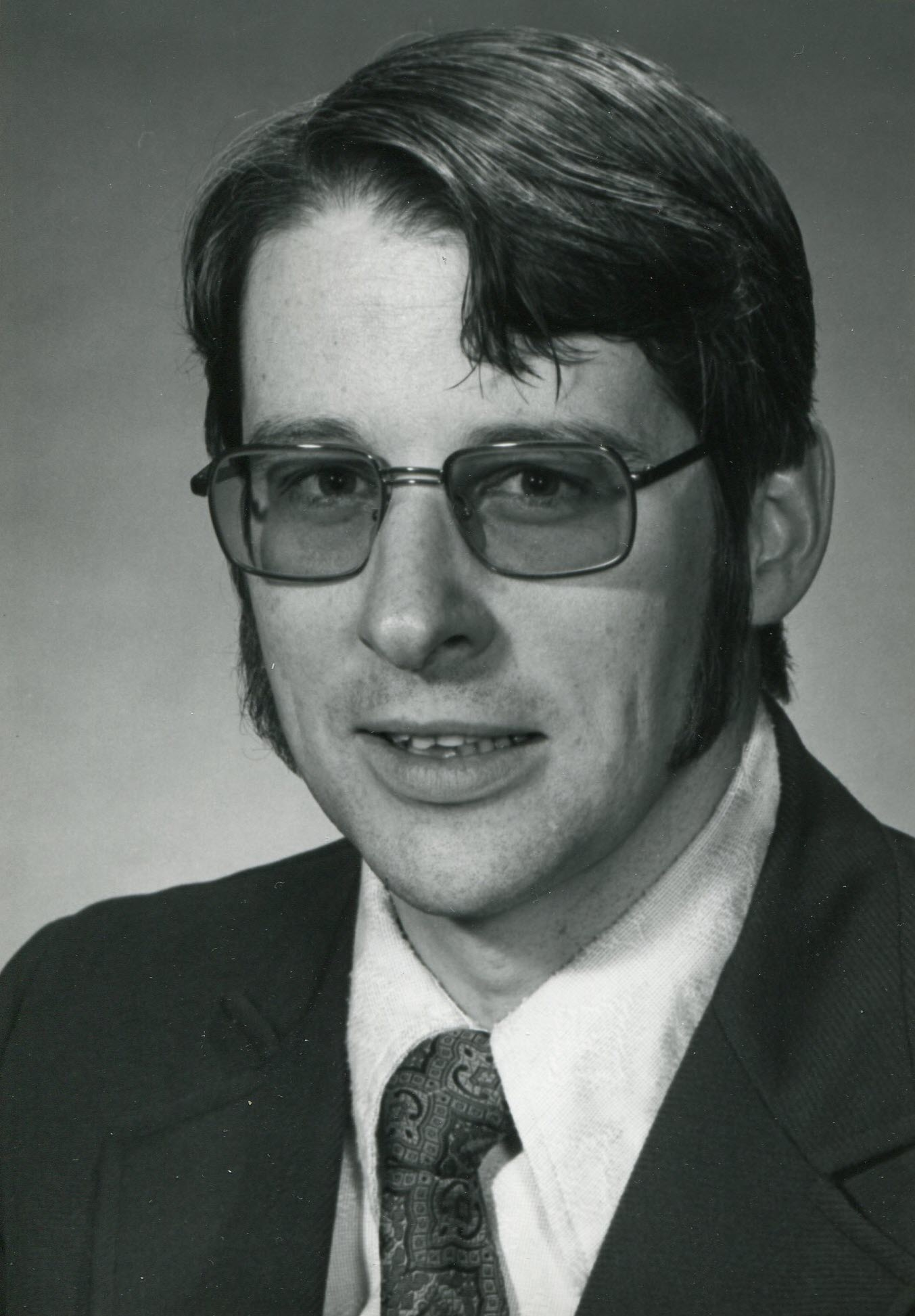
- Rolston in 1972

Member of the British Columbia Legislative Assembly for Dewdney
- In office August 30, 1972 – November 3, 1975
- Preceded by: George Mussallem
- Succeeded by: George Mussallem

Personal details
- Born: August 15, 1937
- Died: November 3, 2006 (aged 69)
- Party: New Democrat
- Spouse: Louise
- Relations: Tilly Rolston (grandmother)
- Education: University of British Columbia
- Occupation: minister

Peter Carson Rolston (August 15, 1937 – November 3, 2006) was a United Church minister and political figure in British Columbia, Canada. He represented Dewdney in the Legislative Assembly of British Columbia from 1972 to 1975 as a New Democratic Party (NDP) member.

== Biography ==
He graduated from the University of British Columbia in 1964 with a bachelor of arts degree, then became ordained in 1965. He served as minister for St. Andrews United Church in Mission, Mt. Paul United Church in Kamloops, St. John's Strawberry Hill Church in Delta, and Northwood United Church in Surrey.

He ran as an NDP candidate in the 1972 provincial election, and defeated the incumbent Social Credit candidate George Mussallem to become member of the Legislative Assembly (MLA) for Dewdney. He lost to Mussallem when he ran for re-election in 1975 in the Dewdney riding, and was defeated in Kamloops in 1986.

Rolston and his wife Louise had two children together. He was the grandson of Tilly Rolston, MLA for Vancouver-Point Grey from 1941 to 1953 and the first woman in Canada with a cabinet portfolio. He died at home of non-Hodgkin lymphoma in 2006.
