= Virtual Museum of New France =

- Established: 1997
- Location: Virtual
- Type: Virtual Museum
- Owner: Canadian Museum of History
- Website: www.historymuseum.ca/virtual-museum-of-new-france/

Canadian Museum of History network
- Canadian Museum of History; Canadian War Museum; Virtual Museum of New France

The Virtual Museum of New France (French: Le Musée virtuel de la Nouvelle-France) is a virtual museum created and managed by the Canadian Museum of History. Its purpose is to share knowledge and raise awareness of the history, culture and legacy of early French settlements in North America.

The site includes interactive maps, photos, illustrations and information based on current research into New France. This encompasses the French settlements and territories that spread from Acadia in the East through the Saint Lawrence Valley, the Great Lakes region, the Ohio Valley, and south to Louisiana from the 16th to the 18th centuries.

The content is written by historical and archaeological scholars and reviewed by other experts. Different sections are devoted to colonies and empires, explorers, economic activities, population, daily life and heritage.

The articles in the Virtual Museum of New France cover a variety of topics pertaining to New France, including important historical figures, territorial expansion by France and competing colonial powers, immigration, social groups, slavery, religion, food, entertainment, science, medicine and governance.

The site was launched in 1997 and expanded in 2011.
