= David William Strachan =

Member of the Legislative Assembly of British Columbia
- In office 1933–1937
- Preceded by: Nelson Seymour Lougheed
- Succeeded by: Frank Porter Patterson
- Constituency: Dewdney
- In office 1938–1941
- Preceded by: Frank Porter Patterson
- Succeeded by: Roderick Charles MacDonald
- Constituency: Dewdney

Personal details
- Born: June 28, 1877 Ormstown, Quebec
- Died: August 19, 1958 (aged 81) Maple Ridge, British Columbia
- Party: British Columbia Liberal Party
- Spouse: Sadie May Fergusson
- Children: 4
- Occupation: farmer

David William Strachan (June 28, 1877 – August 19, 1958) was a Canadian politician. He served in the Legislative Assembly of British Columbia from 1933 to 1937 and 1938 to 1941 from the electoral district of Vancouver-Burrard, a member of the Liberal party.
