= John Alexander Catherwood =

Canadian politician (1857–1940)

John A. Catherwood

Member of the Legislative Assembly of British Columbia
- In office 1920–1928
- Preceded by: John Oliver
- Succeeded by: Nelson Seymour Lougheed
- Constituency: Dewdney

Personal details
- Born: October 26, 1857 Bolton Village, Canada West
- Died: December 21, 1940 (aged 83) Mission, British Columbia
- Party: British Columbia Conservative Party
- Spouse: Edith Margaret Solloway
- Occupation: fruit grower, beekeeper

John Alexander Catherwood (October 26, 1857 – December 21, 1940) was a fruit grower, bee keeper and political figure in British Columbia. He represented Dewdney from 1920 until his retirement at the 1928 provincial election in the Legislative Assembly of British Columbia as a Conservative.

He was born in Bolton Village, Canada West in 1857, the son of Thomas Catherwood and Ann Abercrombie, and was educated in Caledonia. He came to Mission with a Canadian Pacific Railway survey party in 1885. In 1886, Catherwood married Edith Margaret Solloway. He was reeve of Mission, British Columbia for 17 years. Catherwood was unseated in February 1925 by a decision of the B.C. Supreme Court after a recount reduced his majority in the election to 5; he was reinstated in June 1925. He died in Mission City at the age of 83 in 1940.
