= William J. Manson =

Canadian politician (1872–1948)

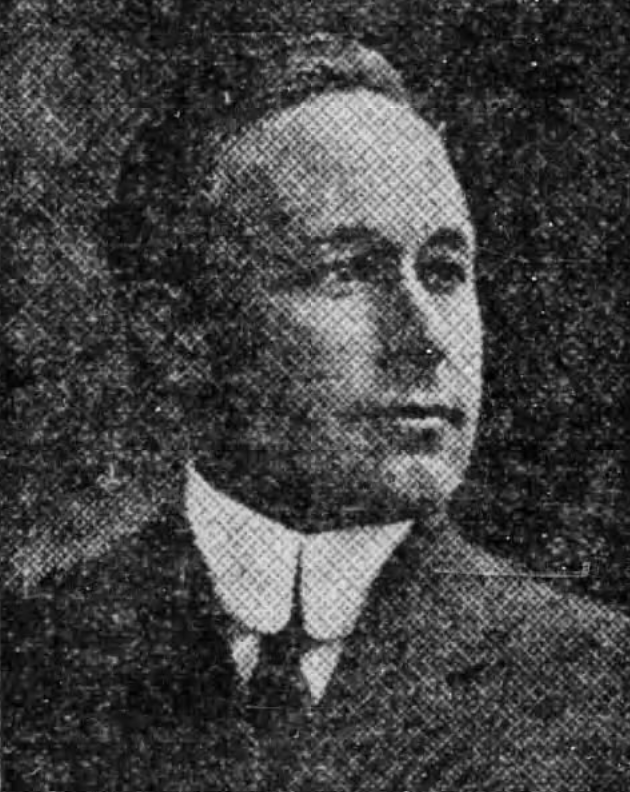

Member of the Legislative Assembly of British Columbia
- In office 1907–1916
- Preceded by: Richard McBride
- Succeeded by: John Oliver
- Constituency: Dewdney

Personal details
- Born: August 19, 1872 Shetland Islands
- Died: January 19, 1948 (aged 75) Vancouver, British Columbia
- Party: British Columbia Conservative Party
- Spouse: Christina Agnes Duncan
- Occupation: Magistrate

William J. Manson (August 19, 1872 – January 19, 1948) was a Canadian politician. He served in the Legislative Assembly of British Columbia from a 1907 byelection until his defeat in the 1916 election, from the electoral district of Dewdney, a member of the Conservative party.
