= Dewdney (electoral district) =

Defunct provincial electoral district in British Columbia, Canada

Dewdney was a provincial electoral district in the Canadian province of British Columbia. Its predecessor was the riding of Westminster-Dewdney, which was created for the 1894 election from a partition of the Westminster riding, which was a rural-area successor to the original New Westminster riding, which was one of the province's first twelve.

== Geography ==
This riding was composed of the municipalities of Pitt Meadows, Maple Ridge and Mission, plus all the rural areas to the east of Mission as far as the Harrison River.

== Members of the Legislative Assembly ==
- Richard McBride, 16th Premier of British Columbia
- John Oliver, 19th Premier of British Columbia
- Dave Barrett, 26th Premier of British Columbia
- George Mussallem
- Lyle Wicks
- Peter Rolston

== Electoral history ==
Note: Winners in each election are in bold.

10th 1903 British Columbia general election
Party	Candidate	Votes	%	±	Expenditures
Conservative	**Richard McBride ^{1}**	**427**	**66.10%**		unknown
Liberal	William Waugh Forrester	219	33.90%		unknown
Total valid votes		646	100.00%		
Total rejected ballots					
Turnout		%			
^{1} 16th Premier of British Columbia.

11th British Columbia election, 1907
Party	Candidate	Votes	%	±	Expenditures
Liberal	Robert Jardine	241	38.56%		unknown
Conservative	**Richard McBride ^{2}**	**384**	**61.44%**		unknown
Total valid votes		625	100.00%		
Total rejected ballots					
Turnout		%			
^{2} Simultaneously MLA for Victoria City

12th British Columbia election, 1909
Party	Candidate	Votes	%	±	Expenditures
Conservative	**William J. Manson**	625	67.42%		unknown
Liberal	Alister Thompson	302	32.58%		unknown
Total valid votes		927	100.00%		
Total rejected ballots					
Turnout		%			

13th British Columbia election, 1912
Party	Candidate	Votes	%	±	Expenditures
Independent Conservative	John Higginson McNeice	194	19.46%		
Conservative	**William J. Manson**	**803**	**80.54%**		unknown
Total valid votes		997	100.00%		

14th British Columbia election, 1916
Party	Candidate	Votes	%	±	Expenditures
Conservative	William J. Manson	787	45.92%		unknown
**Liberal**	**John Oliver ^{3}**	**927**	**54.08%**		unknown
Total valid votes		1,714	100.00%		
Total rejected ballots					
Turnout		%			
^{3} 19th Premier of British Columbia as of 1918.

15th British Columbia election, 1920
Party	Candidate	Votes	%	±	Expenditures
Conservative	**John Alexander Catherwood**	**1,535**	**45.45%**		unknown
Federated Labour Party	William Jamieson Curry	473	14.01%		unknown
Liberal	Donald Bruce Martyn	1,369	40.54%		unknown
Total valid votes		3,377	100.00%		
Total rejected ballots					
Turnout		%			

16th British Columbia election, 1924
Party	Candidate	Votes	%	±	Expenditures
Conservative	**John Alexander Catherwood ^{4}**	**1,259**	**36.60%**		unknown
Provincial	Harold Reginald Smith	935	27.18%	–	unknown
**Liberal**	William Maxwell Smith	1,246	36.22%		unknown
Total valid votes		3,440	100.00%		
Total rejected ballots					
Turnout		%			
^{4} A judicial recount on 29 July 1924 gave Maxwell Smith four extra votes, reducing Catherwood's majority to nine (34 British Columbia Reports 246). A further recount appears to have taken place as a Supreme Court decision of 9 February 1925 which voided the election refers to Catherwood's majority as five. Catherwood was unseated but reinstated 8 June 1925.

17th British Columbia election, 1928
Party	Candidate	Votes	%	±	Expenditures
Conservative	**Nelson Seymour Lougheed**	**2,751**	**58.57%**		unknown
Liberal	David Whiteside	1,946	41.43%		unknown
Total valid votes		4,697	100.00%		
Total rejected ballots		159			
Turnout		%			

18th British Columbia election, 1933
Party	Candidate	Votes	%	±	Expenditures
Independent	Charles George Evans	85	2.09%		unknown
United Front (Workers and Farmers)	Charles James McKendrick	127	3.12%	–	unknown
Co-operative Commonwealth Fed.	George Albert Miller	967	23.75%		unknown
Non-Partisan Independent Group	David Garnet Morse	1,069	26.26%	–	unknown
Independent	Solomon Mussallem	588	14.44%		unknown
**Liberal**	**David William Strachan**	**1,235**	**30.34%**		unknown
Total valid votes		4,071	100.00%		
Total rejected ballots		43			
Turnout		%			

19th British Columbia election, 1937
Party	Candidate	Votes	%	±	Expenditures
Co-operative Commonwealth Fed.	James Miller Cameron	1,274	26.75%		unknown
Conservative	**Frank Porter Patterson**	**1,870**	**39.27%**		unknown
Liberal	David William Strachan	1,618	33.98%		unknown
Total valid votes		4,762	100.00%		
Total rejected ballots		84			
Turnout		%			

20th British Columbia election, 1941
Party	Candidate	Votes	%	±	Expenditures
Conservative	**Roderick Charles MacDonald**	**2,995**	**37.13%**		unknown
Co-operative Commonwealth Fed.	Thomas Greer MacKenzie	2,539	31.48%		unknown
Liberal	David William Strachan	2,532	31.39%		unknown
Total valid votes		8,066	100.00%		
Total rejected ballots		117			
Turnout		%			

21st British Columbia election, 1945
Party	Candidate	Votes	%	±	Expenditures
Co-operative Commonwealth Fed.	William Leonard Hartley	3,953	46.29%		unknown
Coalition	**Roderick Charles MacDonald**	**4,586**	**53.71%**	–	unknown
Total valid votes		8,539	100.00%		
Total rejected ballots		96			
Turnout		%			

22nd British Columbia election, 1949
Party	Candidate	Votes	%	±	Expenditures
Social Credit League	(Mrs.) Lyle Campbell	829	5.01%	–	unknown
Co-operative Commonwealth Fed.	William Leonard Hartley	7,604	45.92%		unknown
Coalition	**Roderick Charles MacDonald**	**8,127**	**49.08%**	–	unknown
Total valid votes		16,560	100.00%		
Total rejected ballots		343			
Turnout		%			

23rd British Columbia election, 1952 ^{5}
Party	Candidate	Votes 1st count	%	Votes final count	%	±%	
Co-operative Commonwealth Fed.	Harry Dean Ainlay	6,024	30.91%	7,248	42.48%		unknown
Liberal	Reginald Clarence Cox	3,631	18.63%	–	– %		unknown
Progressive Conservative	Roderick Charles MacDonald	2,233	11.46%	-	-%		unknown
Social Credit League	**Lyle Wicks**	**7,600**	**39.00%**	**9,813**	**57.52%**		
Total valid votes		19,488	100.00%	17,061	%		
Total rejected ballots		800					
Turnout		%					
^{5}(Preferential ballot: 1st and 3rd counts of three shown only)

24th British Columbia election, 1953 ^{6}
Party	Candidate	Votes 1st count	%	Votes final count	%	±%	
Liberal	Arthur Albyn Emery	3,715	19.65%	–	– %		unknown
Labor-Progressive	Amy Frances Gilstead	250	1.32%	-	– %		
Co-operative Commonwealth Fed.	Kenneth William Pattern	7,003	37.04%	8,310	47.82%		unknown
Christian Democrat	George Frampton Pedlar	72	0.38%				
Progressive Conservative	Murray Lorne Watkins	559	2.96%	-	-%		unknown
Social Credit League	**Lyle Wicks**	**7,307**	**38.65%**	**9,066**	**52.18%**		
Total valid votes		18,906	100.00%	17,376	%		
Total rejected ballots		953					
Turnout		%					
^{6}(Preferential ballot: 1st and 5th counts of five shown only)

25th British Columbia election, 1956
Party	Candidate	Votes	%	±	Expenditures
Liberal	Michale Joseph Butler	4,141	19.15%		unknown
Co-operative Commonwealth Fed.	Naranjan Singh Grewall	7,211	33.35%		unknown
Social Credit	**Lyle Wicks**	10,267	47.49%	–	unknown
Total valid votes		21,619	100.00%		
Total rejected ballots		293			
Turnout		%			

26th British Columbia election, 1960
Party	Candidate	Votes	%	±	Expenditures
**Co-operative Commonwealth Fed.**	**Dave Barrett ^{7}**	**12,637**	**43.73%**		unknown
Progressive Conservative	James Ross Gulloch	803	2.78%		unknown
Communist	Carl Christian Hilland	233	0.81%		unknown
Liberal	Walter Raymond Thompson	4,512	15.61%		unknown
Social Credit	Lyle Wicks	10,713	37.07%	–	unknown
Total valid votes		28,898	100.00%		
Total rejected ballots		406			
Turnout		%			
^{7} 26th Premier of British Columbia 1972–1975.

27th British Columbia election, 1963
Party	Candidate	Votes	%	±	Expenditures
New Democratic	**Dave Barrett**	**11,625**	**41.95%**		unknown
Liberal	Wilfred Robert Jack	4,051	14.62%		unknown
Social Credit	Richard Egerton Lester	10,506	37.91%	–	unknown
Progressive Conservative	Lyn Morrow	1,532	5.53%		unknown
Total valid votes		27,714	100.00%		
Total rejected ballots		251			
Turnout		%			

28th British Columbia election, 1966
Party	Candidate	Votes	%	±	Expenditures
Liberal	Thomas H. Davison	1,146	9.41%		unknown
New Democratic	William R. Franklin	4,528	37.17%		unknown
Social Credit	**George Mussallem**	**6,507**	**53.42%**	–	unknown
Total valid votes		12,181	100.00%		
Total rejected ballots		88			
Turnout		%			

29th British Columbia election, 1969
Party	Candidate	Votes	%	±	Expenditures
New Democratic	Stuart Malcolm Leggatt	5,980	36.89%		unknown
Liberal	Peter Macaulay McDonald	1,987	12.26%		unknown
Social Credit	**George Mussallem**	**8,243**	**50.85%**	–	unknown
Total valid votes		16,210	100.00%		
Total rejected ballots		158			
Turnout		%			

30th British Columbia election, 1972
Party	Candidate	Votes	%	±	Expenditures
Social Credit	George Mussallem	7,548	38.30%	–	unknown
New Democratic	**Peter Rolston**	**9,228**	**46.83%**		unknown
Progressive Conservative	Edward Arthur Watson	1,717	8.71%		unknown
Liberal	Theodore John Worthington	1,214	6.16%		unknown
Total valid votes		19,707	100.00%		
Total rejected ballots		164			
Turnout		%			

31st British Columbia election, 1975
Party	Candidate	Votes	%	±	Expenditures
Progressive Conservative	John Willison Green	1,249	5.19%		unknown
Independents	Douglas Wilbur Maddin	188	0.78%		unknown
Social Credit	**George Mussallem**	**13,024**	**54.10%**	–	unknown
New Democratic	Peter Rolston	9,613	39.93%		unknown
Total valid votes		24,074	100.00%		
Total rejected ballots		247			
Turnout		%			

32nd British Columbia election, 1979
Party	Candidate	Votes	%	±	Expenditures
Social Credit	**George Mussallem**	**12,643**	**51.31%**	–	unknown
New Democratic	Joan Mary Norris	11,998	48.69%		unknown
Total valid votes		24,641	100.00%		
Total rejected ballots		467			
Turnout		%			

33rd British Columbia election, 1983
Party	Candidate	Votes	%	±	Expenditures
Western Canada Concept	Wally Altwasser	566	1.76%		unknown
Liberal	Robert L. Moore	410	1.28%		unknown
Social Credit	**Forbes Charles Austin Pelton**	**15,820**	**49.34%**	–	unknown
New Democratic	Sophie Weremchuk	15,269	47.62%		unknown
Total valid votes		32,065	100.00%		
Total rejected ballots		366			
Turnout		%			

44th British Columbia election, 1986 ^{7}
Party	Candidate	Votes	%	±	Expenditures
Liberal	Bruce Bingham	2,203	3.48%		unknown
New Democratic	William James (Bill) Hartley	14,923	23.56%		unknown
Social Credit	**Johann Alvin Norman Jacobsen**	**15,328**	**24.19%**	–	unknown
Social Credit	**Forbes Charles Austin Pelton**	**15,614**	**24.65%**	–	unknown
New Democratic	Sophie Weremchuk	15,279	24.12%		unknown
Total valid votes		63,347	100.00%		
Total rejected ballots		766			
Turnout		%			
^{7} Seat increased to two members from one.

Legislative Assembly of British Columbia
Preceded by Victoria City; Alberni	Constituency represented by the Premier of British Columbia; 1903–1909; 1918–1920	Succeeded by Victoria City; Victoria City
