= Joan O'Malley =

Canadian public servant

Joan O'Malley (née Donovan) is a retired Canadian public servant who, on November 6, 1964, sewed the first Canadian flag. She is sometimes referred to as Canada's Betsy Ross.

== November 6, 1964 ==
During the 1963 federal election campaign, Prime Minister Lester Pearson promised that Canada would have a new flag within two years of his election. Three designs were chosen from a list of more than 3,500 entries. The designs included the current Canadian flag, the “Pearson Pennant”, and a third design that resembled the current flag, but with a Union Jack and three fleurs-de-lis.

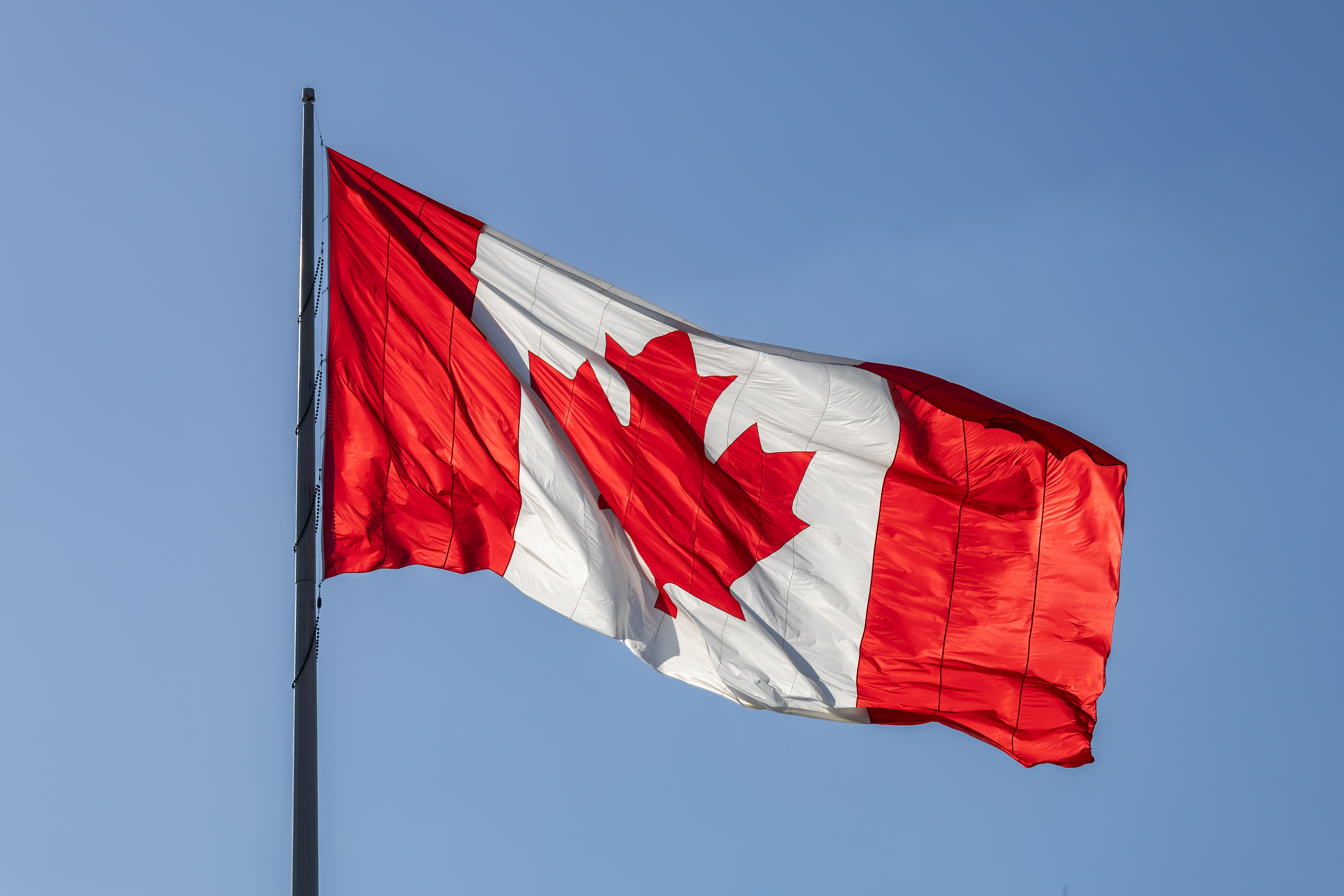
Canadian Flag

On November 6, 1964 – a Friday – Pearson requested that prototypes of the three flag designs under consideration be delivered to 24 Sussex Drive so that he could see them displayed at his summer residence at Harrington Lake that weekend. The request came to Ken Donovan, O'Malley's father and the assistant purchasing director with the Canadian Government Exhibition Commission, at around 4:00 pm.

The flags had to be entirely “Canadian content”. However, the request had come after normal business hours and the only company that could supply the material – S.E. Woods – had no overtime staff to sew the flags. Donovan contacted O'Malley, then 20 years old, at around 5:00 or 5:30 pm and explained his dilemma. A secretary at the Indian Affairs Branch of the Department of Citizenship, O'Malley did not consider herself a professional seamstress and, at the time, her sewing experience was limited to sewing her own clothing. Nevertheless, she agreed to prepare the prototypes. She packed up her Singer sewing machine and drove to the Exhibition Commission office on Kaladar Avenue shortly after 7:00 pm.

The scene O'Malley encountered was hectic. Designer Jacques St. Cyr was attempting to adjust the maple leaf in the design layout, while Ivan Desrosiers and John Williams were cutting film for silk-screening, and production chief Jack Rachlis was trying to screen the cloth. Their first attempts were unsuccessful because the team did not have enough ink. Large fans were set up to help dry the cloth more quickly. O'Malley worked at a makeshift table set on wooden sawhorses, sewing largely by hand, as she was unfamiliar with grommets, toggles, and rope holes.

O'Malley completed the six flags – two flags of each design – shortly after midnight, unaware she had just produced the first prototypes of Canada's new national flag. They were delivered to 24 Sussex in the middle of the night and hoisted at Harrington Lake the next morning.

== Legacy ==
O’Malley was initially told to keep her role in creating the Canadian flag secret and she did not speak of her experience for 10 years. However, she later became an ambassador for the flag and has attended dozens of flag-related events.

The Singer sewing machine that O'Malley used to create the six prototypes was displayed at the Canadian Museum of History's Canadian History Hall from 2017 to 2019. The whereabouts of the prototypes themselves is unknown.

=== Comparison to Betsy Ross ===
O'Malley is sometimes compared to Betsy Ross, an American upholsterer who, according to legend, created the first American flag. However, she rejects the comparison, noting that much of the story surrounding Ross is more myth than fact.

== Personal life ==
O'Malley continued to work for the federal government and eventually took a job with the Ontario Attorney General's office in Ottawa. She retired in 1996.

O'Malley was born in Dauphin, Manitoba. She and her husband, Brian, raised two children.

== Awards and recognition ==
In 2002, O'Malley was among 50 Canadians invited to a state luncheon with Queen Elizabeth II and Prince Philip at Rideau Hall, celebrating the Queen's Golden Jubilee. She represented the year 1965 when the new Canadian flag first flew above Parliament.

At a ceremony on Parliament Hill on November 14, 2014, O'Malley was presented with the flag that had been flown on the Peace Tower on November 6 of that year, exactly 50 years after she had sewn the first prototype. At the ceremony, she noted that while she was never paid to create the flags, she considered the recognition she received to be payment enough.
