= George Mussallem =

Canadian politician (1908-2007)

Member of the British Columbia Legislative Assembly for Dewdney
- In office December 11, 1975 – April 7, 1983
- Preceded by: Peter Rolston
- Succeeded by: Austin Pelton
- In office September 12, 1966 – July 24, 1972
- Preceded by: Dave Barrett
- Succeeded by: Peter Rolston

Personal details
- Born: January 5, 1908 Winnipeg, Manitoba
- Died: April 10, 2007 (aged 99) British Columbia, Canada
- Party: British Columbia Social Credit Party
- Spouse(s): Beth Brown (m. 1934; died 1962) Grace Cuthbert (m. 1970)
- Relations: Helen Mussallem (sister)

George Mussallem (January 5, 1908 – April 10, 2007) was an automobile dealer and political figure in British Columbia, Canada. He represented Dewdney in the Legislative Assembly of British Columbia from 1966 to 1972 and from 1975 to 1983 as a Social Credit member.

== Biography ==
He was born in Winnipeg, Manitoba, the son of Solomon Mussallem and Annie Besytt, both natives of Lebanon. Mussallem moved with his family to Prince Rupert and Vancouver, before settling in Haney in 1919 where Solomon established a garage. The business evolved into an automotive dealership, initially representing Ford and later General Motors. George was involved in the family business, and eventually became president of the Motor Dealers' Association of B.C. He also served as president of the Executive Committee for the Boy Scouts in British Columbia.

Mussallem ran as a Social Credit candidate in the 1966 provincial election, and was elected member of the Legislative Assembly for Dewdney. He was re-elected in 1969, but lost to New Democrat Peter Rolston in 1972. He faced Rolston again in the 1975 provincial election, this time defeating the latter to re-enter the legislature. He won re-election in 1979, and served as whip for the Social Credit Party in the assembly before retiring from politics in 1983.

He married Beth Brown in 1934, with whom he had three children. After Beth died in 1962, he married Grace Cuthbert in 1970. His sister Helen worked for the World Health Organization to develop nurse training and triage systems. Mussallem received his pilot's license in 1929 and continued to fly until his late 70s. He received freeman status in both Mission and Maple Ridge in 1983. He died in 2007 at age 99.
