= Nelson Seymour Lougheed =

Canadian politician (1882–1944)

Member of the Legislative Assembly for Dewdney
- In office July 18, 1928 – November 2, 1933
- Preceded by: John Alexander Catherwood
- Succeeded by: David William Strachan

Personal details
- Born: April 16, 1882 Thornbury, Ontario, Canada
- Died: June 6, 1944 (aged 62) Vancouver, British Columbia, Canada
- Party: Conservative
- Spouse: Irene Ann Brown
- Occupation: Businessman
- Known for: Namesake of Lougheed Highway

Nelson Seymour Lougheed (April 16, 1882 – June 6, 1944) was a businessman and political figure in British Columbia. He represented Dewdney in the Legislative Assembly of British Columbia from 1928 until his retirement at the 1933 provincial election as a Conservative.

He was born in Thornbury, Ontario in 1882, and moved to British Columbia with his family in 1889. In 1905, Lougheed moved to Port Haney, where he partnered with G.G. Abernethy to operate a sawmill. He was also active in mining and logging. Lougheed was mayor of Maple Ridge. He served in the provincial cabinet as Minister of Public Works from 1928 to 1930 and as Minister of Lands from 1930 to 1933. Lougheed died in Vancouver at the age of 62 in 1944.

The Lougheed Highway was named after him.
