= Frank Porter Patterson =

Canadian politician (1876–1938)

Member of the Legislative Assembly of British Columbia
- In office 1937–1938
- Preceded by: David William Strachan
- Succeeded by: David William Strachan
- Constituency: Dewdney

Personal details
- Born: December 24, 1876 St. John County, New Brunswick
- Died: February 10, 1938 (aged 61) Vancouver, British Columbia
- Party: British Columbia Conservative Party
- Spouse: Lillian Patterson
- Occupation: physician, surgeon

Frank Porter Patterson (December 24, 1876 – February 10, 1938) was a physician and political figure in British Columbia. He represented Dewdney in the Legislative Assembly of British Columbia from 1937 to 1938, as a Conservative. Patterson served as leader of the Conservative Party from July 1936 until his death in 1938.

He was born in St. John County, New Brunswick and was educated there and at McGill University, receiving an M.D. Patterson continued with post-graduate studies in Europe. He served as chief surgeon of the bone and joint department for the Vancouver General Hospital and St. Paul's Hospital. Patterson served in the Canadian Army Medical Corps during World War I. He ran unsuccessfully for the Vancouver-Burrard seat in the provincial assembly in a 1936 by-election. Patterson lived in Vancouver. He was the Leader of the Opposition in the provincial assembly from June 1937, until his death in Vancouver at the age of 61 on February 10, 1938.

Patterson was the first orthopaedic surgeon in British Columbia.
