= Helen Mussallem =

Canadian nurse

Helen Mussallem CC FRCN DGStJ
- Born: Helen Kathleen Mussallem; 7 January 1915; Prince Rupert, British Columbia, Canada
- Died: 9 November 2012 (aged 97); Ottawa, Ontario, Canada
- Occupation: Nurse

Coat of Arms of Helen Mussallem

Helen Kathleen Mussallem CC, FRCN, DGStJ (7 January 1915 – 9 November 2012) was a Canadian nurse, who served in the Royal Canadian Army Medical Corps during World War II.

== Life ==
Born in Prince Rupert, British Columbia to Solomon and Annie (née Besytt) Mussallem, both of Lebanese descent, Mussallem studied at the School of Nursing, Vancouver General Hospital from 1934 to 1937. Between 1943 and 1946, she served as a surgical nurse and lieutenant in the Royal Canadian Army Medical Corps during World War II. In 1947, she attended McGill University, where she received her bachelor's degree in Nursing. She received her Master's of Arts in education from Columbia University Teachers College and was the first Canadian nurse to earn a doctoral degree from Columbia University. From 1963 to 1981, she was executive director of the Canadian Nurses Association. From 1989 to 1991 she was the President of the Victorian Order of Nurses.

== Death ==
Mussallem died in Ottawa at the age of 97 on 9 November 2012.

== Honours ==
Badge of Office of Capilano Herald Extraordinary

- She was the first nurse outside the United Kingdom to be honoured as a Fellow of the Royal College of Nursing.
- She received the highest award that can be awarded by the International Red Cross, the Florence Nightingale Medal.
- In 1982, she was appointed Dame of Grace of the Venerable Order of Saint John.
- In 1969, she was made an Officer of the Order of Canada and was promoted to Companion in 1992.
- In 2006, she was appointed Capilano Herald Extraordinary within the Canadian Heraldic Authority.
- She received honorary degrees from Memorial University, the University of New Brunswick, Queen's University, McMaster University, the University of British Columbia, and the University of Ottawa.
