= 23rd Parliament of British Columbia =

The 23rd Legislative Assembly of British Columbia sat from February 1953 to March 1953. The members were elected in the British Columbia general election held in June 1952. The Social Credit Party led by W. A. C. Bennett formed the government. The Co-operative Commonwealth Federation led by Harold Winch formed the official opposition.

Thomas James Irwin served as speaker for the assembly.

The government was defeated on Bill 79, known as the "Rolston formula", on March 24.

== Members of the 23rd Parliament ==
The following members were elected to the assembly in 1952:

Member	Electoral district	Party	First elected / previously elected	No.# of term(s)
Stanley John Squire	Alberni	CCF	1952	1st term
Frank Arthur Calder	Atlin	CCF	1949	2nd term
Ernest Edward Winch	Burnaby	CCF	1933	6th term
William Ralph Talbot Chetwynd	Cariboo	Social Credit	1952	1st term
William Kenneth Kiernan	Chilliwack	Social Credit	1952	1st term
Richard Orr Newton	Columbia	Social Credit	1952	1st term
Robert William Bonner (1952)	Columbia	Social Credit	1952	1st term
William Campbell Moore	Comox	CCF	1952	1st term
Robert Martin Strachan	Cowichan-Newcastle	CCF	1952	1st term
Leo Thomas Nimsick	Cranbrook	CCF	1949	2nd term
Thomas Irwin	Delta	Social Credit	1952	1st term
Lyle Wicks	Dewdney	Social Credit	1952	1st term
Frank Mitchell	Esquimalt	CCF	1951	2nd term
Thomas Aubert Uphill	Fernie	Labour	1920	9th term
Llewellyn Leslie King	Fort George	Social Credit	1952	1st term
Rupert Williams Haggen	Grand Forks-Greenwood	CCF	1949	2nd term
Philip Arthur Gaglardi	Kamloops	Social Credit	1952	1st term
Randolph Harding	Kaslo-Slocan	CCF	1945	3rd term
Ernest Crawford Carson	Lillooet	Progressive Conservative	1928, 1941	5th term*
Anthony John Gargrave	Mackenzie	CCF	1952	1st term
Lorenzo (Larry) Giovando	Nanaimo and the Islands	Progressive Conservative	1952	1st term
Wesley Drewett Black	Nelson-Creston	Social Credit	1952	1st term
John McRae (Rae) Eddie	New Westminster	CCF	1952	1st term
Lorne Shantz	North Okanagan	Social Credit	1952	1st term
Martin Elliott Sowden	North Vancouver	Liberal	1952	1st term
Philip Archibald Gibbs	Oak Bay	Liberal	1952	1st term
Cyril Morley Shelford	Omineca	Social Credit	1952	1st term
Charles William Parker	Peace River	Social Credit	1952	1st term
George Edwin Hills	Prince Rupert	CCF	1952	1st term
Vincent Segur	Revelstoke	CCF	1943, 1952	2nd term*
Robert Edward Sommers	Rossland-Trail	Social Credit	1952	1st term
Frank Snowsell	Saanich	CCF	1952	1st term
James Allan Reid	Salmon Arm	Social Credit	1952	1st term
Harry Denyer Francis	Similkameen	Social Credit	1952	1st term
Einar Maynard Gunderson (1952)	Similkameen	Social Credit	1952	1st term
Edward Tourtellotte Kenney	Skeena	Liberal	1933	6th term
William Andrew Cecil Bennett	South Okanagan	Social Credit	1941, (Note: First elected as a Conservative) 1949	4th term*
Eric Charles Fitzgerald Martin	Vancouver-Burrard	Social Credit	1952	1st term
Bert Price	Vancouver-Burrard	Social Credit	1952	1st term
James Campbell Bury	Vancouver Centre	CCF	1952	1st term
Laura Emma Marshall Jamieson	Vancouver Centre	CCF	1939, 1952	3rd term*
Arthur James Turner	Vancouver East	CCF	1941	4th term
Harold Edward Winch	Vancouver East	CCF	1933	6th term
Albert Reginald MacDougall	Vancouver-Point Grey	Progressive Conservative	1946	3rd term
George Clark Miller	Vancouver-Point Grey	Progressive Conservative	1952	1st term
Tilly Jean Rolston	Vancouver-Point Grey	Social Credit	1941	4th term
Nancy Hodges	Victoria City	Liberal	1941	4th term
Daniel John Proudfoot	Victoria City	Liberal	1949	2nd term
William Thomas Straith	Victoria City	Liberal	1937	5th term
Irvine Finlay Corbett	Yale	Social Credit	1952	1st term

== Party standings ==
Affiliation	Members
Social Credit	19
Co-operative Commonwealth	18
Liberal	6
Progressive Conservative	4
Labour	1
Total	48
Government Majority	-10

== By-elections ==
By-elections were held to replace members for various reasons:

Electoral district	Member elected	Party	Election date	Reason
Columbia	Robert William Bonner	Social Credit	November 24, 1952	R.O. Newton resigned to provide seat for R.W. Bonner
Similkameen	Einar Maynard Gunderson	Social Credit	November 24, 1952	H.D. Francis resigned to provide seat for E.M. Gunderson

== Other changes ==
- Lillooet (dec. Ernest Crawford Carson October 21, 1952)
- Vancouver-Point Grey (dec. Albert Reginald MacDougall January 20, 1953)
