= W. A. C. Bennett ministry =

Cabinet of British Columbia, 1952–1972

W.A.C. Bennett ministry
- 25th ministry of British Columbia
- Date formed: August 1, 1952
- Date dissolved: September 15, 1972

People and organisations
- Monarch: Elizabeth II
- Lieutenant Governor: Clarence Wallace (1952–1955); Frank Mackenzie Ross (1955–1960); George Pearkes (1960–1968); John Robert Nicholson (1968–1972)
- Premier: W. A. C. Bennett
- Member party: Social Credit
- Status in legislature: Minority (1952–1953); Majority (1953–1972)
- Opposition party: CCF/New Democratic
- Opposition leader: Harold Winch (1952–1953); Arnold Webster (1953–1956); Robert Strachan (1956–1969); Dave Barrett (1970–1972)

History
- Elections: 1952; 1953; 1956; 1960; 1963; 1966; 1969
- Outgoing election: 1972
- Legislature terms: 23rd; 24th; 25th; 26th; 27th; 28th; 29th
- Predecessor: Boss Johnson ministry
- Successor: Barrett ministry

The W. A. C. Bennett ministry was the combined Cabinet (formally the Executive Council of British Columbia) that governed British Columbia from August 1, 1952, to September 15, 1972. It was led by W. A. C. Bennett, the 25th premier of British Columbia, and consisted of members of the Social Credit Party.

The W. A. C. Bennett ministry was established after the 1952 British Columbia general election when Premier Boss Johnson was defeated in the general election and, following the surprise win of the leaderless Social Credit Party, W. A. C. Bennett was elected as party leader and premier-designate shortly after the general election. The cabinet governed through the 29th Parliament of British Columbia, until the Social Credit Party was defeated in the 1972 British Columbia general election. It was succeeded by the Barrett ministry. This ministry is also the cabinet with the longest duration of governance in the province's history.

== List of ministers ==
W.A.C Bennett ministry by portfolio
Portfolio	Minister	Tenure	
Portfolio	Minister	Start	End
Premier of British Columbia	W.A.C. Bennett	August 1, 1952	September 15, 1972
Minister of Agriculture	William Kiernan	August 1, 1952	September 27, 1956
Minister of Agriculture	Ralph Chetwynd	September 27, 1956	April 3, 1957
Minister of Agriculture	Vacant	April 3, 1957	April 10, 1957
Minister of Agriculture	Lyle Wicks	April 10, 1957	April 15, 1957
Minister of Agriculture	W.A.C. Bennett	April 15, 1957	September 13, 1957
Minister of Agriculture	Newton Steacy	September 13, 1957	November 28, 1960
Minister of Agriculture	Frank Richter	November 28, 1960	May 27, 1968
Minister of Agriculture	Cyril Shelford	May 27, 1968	September 15, 1972
Attorney General	Robert Bonner	August 1, 1952	May 27, 1968
Attorney General	Leslie Peterson	May 27, 1968	September 15, 1972
Minister of Conmmercial Transport (Note: "Railways" from August 1, 1952 to March 20, 1959)	Ralph Chetwynd	August 1, 1952	September 27, 1956
Minister of Conmmercial Transport	Lyle Wicks	September 27, 1956	November 28, 1960
Minister of Conmmercial Transport	Earle Westwood	November 28, 1960	December 4, 1963
Minister of Conmmercial Transport	William Kiernan	December 4, 1963	March 20, 1964
Minister of Conmmercial Transport	Robert Bonner	March 20, 1964	May 27, 1968
Minister of Conmmercial Transport	Frank Richter	May 27, 1968	September 15, 1972
Minister of Education	Tilly Rolston	August 1, 1952	October 12, 1953
Minister of Education	Vacant	October 12, 1953	October 19, 1953
Minister of Education	Robert Bonner	October 19, 1953	April 14, 1954
Minister of Education	Ray Williston	April 14, 1954	September 27, 1956
Minister of Education	Leslie Peterson	September 27, 1956	May 27, 1968
Minister of Education	Donald Brothers	May 27, 1968	September 15, 1972
Minister of Finance	Einar Gunderson	August 1, 1952	February 15, 1954
Minister of Finance	W.A.C. Bennett	February 15, 1954	September 15, 1972
Minister of Health Services and Hospital Insurance (Note: "Health and Welfare" from August 1, 1952 to March 20, 1959)	Eric Martin	August 1, 1952	December 12, 1966
Minister of Health Services and Hospital Insurance	Wesley Black	December 12, 1966	May 24, 1968
Minister of Health Services and Hospital Insurance	Ralph Loffmark	May 24, 1968	September 15, 1972
Minister of Highways	Phil Gaglardi	March 15, 1955	March 21, 1968
Minister of Highways	W.A.C. Bennett	March 21, 1968	April 25, 1968
Minister of Highways	Wesley Black	April 25, 1968	September 15, 1972
Minister of Industrial Development, Trade and Commerce (Note: "Trade and Industry" from August 1, 1952 to March 28, 1957)	Ralph Chetwynd	August 1, 1952	September 27, 1956
Minister of Industrial Development, Trade and Commerce	Earle Westwood	September 27, 1956	March 28, 1957
Minister of Industrial Development, Trade and Commerce	Robert Bonner	March 28, 1957	March 20, 1964
Minister of Industrial Development, Trade and Commerce	Ralph Loffmark	March 20, 1964	April 25, 1968
Minister of Industrial Development, Trade and Commerce	Waldo Skillings	April 25, 1968	September 15, 1972
Minister of Labour	Lyle Wicks	August 1, 1952	November 28, 1960
Minister of Labour	Leslie Peterson	November 28, 1960	April 2, 1971
Minister of Labour	James Chabot	April 2, 1971	September 15, 1972
Minister of Lands, Forests, Water Resources (Note: "Lands and Forest" from August 1, 1952 to March 30, 1962)	Robert Sommers	August 1, 1952	February 28, 1956
Minister of Lands, Forests, Water Resources	Ray Gillis Williston	February 28, 1956	September 15, 1972
Minister of Municipal Affairs	Wesley Black	August 1, 1952	March 20, 1964
Minister of Municipal Affairs	Daniel Campbell	March 20, 1964	September 15, 1972
Provincial Secretary	Wesley Black	August 1, 1952	September 15, 1972
Minister of Public Works	Phil Gaglardi	August 1, 1952	March 15, 1955
Minister of Public Works	William Chant	March 15, 1955	September 15, 1972
Minister of Recreation and Conservation (Note: "Fisheries" from August 1, 1952 to March 28, 1957)	Ralph Chetwynd	August 1, 1952	March 28, 1957
Minister of Recreation and Conservation	Earle Westwood	March 28, 1957	December 4, 1963
Minister of Recreation and Conservation	William Kiernan	December 4, 1963	September 15, 1972
Minister of Rehabilitation and Social Improvement (Note: "Social Welfare" from March 20, 1959 to April 1, 1970)	Wesley Black	August 1, 1952	December 12, 1966
Minister of Rehabilitation and Social Improvement	Daniel Robert John Campbell	December 12, 1966	October 27, 1969
Minister of Rehabilitation and Social Improvement	Phil Gaglardi	October 27, 1969	September 15, 1972
Minister of Travel Industry	William Kiernan	March 23, 1967	September 15, 1972
Minister without Portfolio	Buda Brown	November 28, 1960	August 12, 1962
Minister without Portfolio	Isabel Dawson	December 12, 1966	September 15, 1972
Minister without Portfolio	Patricia Jordan	December 12, 1966	September 15, 1972
Minister without Portfolio	Grace McCarthy	December 12, 1966	September 15, 1972
Minister without Portfolio	Phil Gaglardi	March 21, 1968	October 27, 1969
