= 28th Parliament of British Columbia =

The 28th Legislative Assembly of British Columbia sat from 1967 to 1969. The members were elected in the British Columbia general election held in September 1966. The Social Credit Party led by W. A. C. Bennett formed the government. The New Democratic Party (NDP) led by Robert Strachan formed the official opposition.

William Harvey Murray served as speaker for the assembly.

== Members of the 28th Parliament ==
The following members were elected to the assembly in 1966:

Member	Electoral district	Party	First elected / previously elected	No.# of term(s)
Howard Richmond McDiarmid	Alberni	Social Credit	1966	1st term
Frank Arthur Calder	Atlin	NDP	1949, 1960	6th term*
Francis Xavier Richter	Boundary-Similkameen	Social Credit	1953	5th term
Gordon Dowding	Burnaby-Edmonds	NDP	1956	4th term
Eileen Dailly	Burnaby North	NDP	1966	1st term
Fred Vulliamy	Burnaby-Willingdon	NDP	1966	1st term
James Gibson Lorimer (1969)	Burnaby-Willingdon	NDP	1969	1st term
William Collins Speare	Cariboo	Social Credit	1957	4th term
Robert William Bonner (1966)	Cariboo	Social Credit	1952, (Note: Columbia) 1966	6th term*
William Kenneth Kiernan	Chilliwack	Social Credit	1952	6th term
James Roland Chabot	Columbia River	Social Credit	1963	2nd term
Daniel Robert John Campbell	Comox	Social Credit	1956	4th term
David Barrett	Coquitlam	NDP	1960	3rd term
Robert Martin Strachan	Cowichan-Malahat	NDP	1952	6th term
Robert Wenman	Delta	Social Credit	1966	1st term
George Mussallem	Dewdney	Social Credit	1966	1st term
Herbert Joseph Bruch	Esquimalt	Social Credit	1953	5th term
Ray Gillis Williston	Fort George	Social Credit	1953	5th term
Philip Arthur Gaglardi	Kamloops	Social Credit	1952	6th term
Leo Thomas Nimsick	Kootenay	NDP	1949	7th term
Hunter Bertram Vogel	Langley	Social Credit	1963	2nd term
Isabel Dawson	Mackenzie	Social Credit	1966	1st term
David Daniel Stupich	Nanaimo	NDP	1963	2nd term
Wesley Drewett Black	Nelson-Creston	Social Credit	1952	6th term
John McRae (Rae) Eddie	New Westminster	NDP	1952	6th term
Patricia Jordan	North Okanagan	Social Credit	1966	1st term
Dean Edward Smith	North Peace River	Social Credit	1966	1st term
Raymond Joseph Perrault	North Vancouver-Capilano	Liberal	1960	3rd term
David Maurice Brousson (1968)	North Vancouver-Capilano	Liberal	1968	1st term
Barrie Aird Clark	North Vancouver-Seymour	Liberal	1966	1st term
Alan Brock MacFarlane	Oak Bay	Liberal	1960	3rd term
Allan Leslie Cox (1968)	Oak Bay	Liberal	1968	1st term
Cyril Morley Shelford	Omineca	Social Credit	1952	6th term
William Harvey Murray	Prince Rupert	Social Credit	1956	4th term
Randolph Harding	Revelstoke-Slocan	NDP	1945	8th term
William Stewart King (1968)	Revelstoke-Slocan	NDP	1968	1st term
Ernest A. LeCours	Richmond	Social Credit	1963	2nd term
Donald Leslie Brothers	Rossland-Trail	Social Credit	1958	4th term
John Douglas Tidball Tisdalle	Saanich and the Islands	Social Credit	1953	5th term
Willis Franklin Jefcoat	Shuswap	Social Credit	1960	3rd term
Dudley George Little	Skeena	Social Credit	1960	3rd term
William Andrew Cecil Bennett	South Okanagan	Social Credit	1941, (Note: First elected as a Conservative) 1949	9th term*
Donald McGray Phillips	South Peace River	Social Credit	1966	1st term
Ernest Hall	Surrey	NDP	1966	1st term
Thomas Rodney Berger	Vancouver-Burrard	NDP	1966	1st term
Raymond Parkinson	Vancouver-Burrard	NDP	1966	1st term
Harold Peter (Herb) Capozzi	Vancouver Centre	Social Credit	1966	1st term
Evan Maurice Wolfe	Vancouver Centre	Social Credit	1966	1st term
Alexander Barrett MacDonald	Vancouver East	NDP	1960	3rd term
Robert Arthur Williams	Vancouver East	NDP	1966	1st term
Grace Mary McCarthy	Vancouver-Little Mountain	Social Credit	1966	1st term
Leslie Raymond Peterson	Vancouver-Little Mountain	Social Credit	1956	5th term
Garde Basil Gardom	Vancouver-Point Grey	Liberal	1966	1st term
Patrick Lucey McGeer	Vancouver-Point Grey	Liberal	1962	3rd term
Thomas Audley Bate	Vancouver South	Social Credit	1953, (Note: Vancouver-Point Grey) 1966	4th term*
Ralph Raymond Loffmark	Vancouver South	Social Credit	1963	2nd term
Norman Levi (1968)	Vancouver South	NDP	1968	1st term
William Neelands Chant	Victoria	Social Credit	1953	5th term
Waldo McTavish Skillings	Victoria	Social Credit	1960	3rd term
Louis Allan Williams	West Vancouver-Howe Sound	Liberal	1966	1st term
William Leonard Hartley	Yale-Lillooet	NDP	1963	2nd term

== Party standings ==
Affiliation	Members
Social Credit	33
New Democratic	16
Liberal	6
Total	55
Government Majority	11

== By-elections ==
By-elections were held to replace members for various reasons:

Electoral district	Member elected	Party	Election date	Reason
Cariboo	Robert William Bonner	Social Credit	November 28, 1966	W.C. Speare resigned to provide seat for R.W. Bonner
Vancouver South	Norman Levi	NDP	May 21, 1968	death of T.A. Bate September 21, 1967
North Vancouver-Capilano	David Maurice Brousson	Liberal	July 15, 1968	R.J. Perrault resigned June 5, 1968, to contest federal seat
Oak Bay	Allan Leslie Cox	Liberal	July 15, 1968	A.B. MacFarlane resigned April 25, 1968, for "personal reasons"; named to B.C. Supreme Court April 26, 1968
Revelstoke-Slocan	William Stewart King	NDP	July 15, 1968	R. Harding resigned June 5, 1968, to contest federal seat
Burnaby-Willingdon	James Gibson Lorimer	NDP	January 13, 1969	death of F.J. Vulliamy October 20, 1968

== Other changes ==
- Cariboo (res. Robert Bonner 1969)
