= Tilly Rolston =

Canadian politician (1887-1953)

Minister of Education of British Columbia
- In office August 1, 1952 – October 12, 1953
- Premier: W. A. C. Bennett
- Preceded by: William Thomas Straith
- Succeeded by: Robert Bonner

Member of the British Columbia Legislative Assembly for Vancouver-Point Grey
- In office October 21, 1941 – April 10, 1953 Serving with Royal Maitland and James Alexander Paton (1941-1946), Leigh Stevenson (1946-1952), Albert Reginald MacDougall (1946-1953), George Clark Miller (1952-1953)
- Preceded by: George Moir Weir
- Succeeded by: Arthur Laing

Personal details
- Born: Tilly Jean Cameron; February 23, 1887 Vancouver, British Columbia
- Died: October 12, 1953 (aged 66) Vancouver, British Columbia
- Party: Social Credit (1952-1953); Independent (1951-1952); Conservative (1941-1951)
- Spouse: Frederick James Rolston (m. 1909; died 1945)
- Relations: Peter Rolston (grandson)
- Occupation: teacher; politician

Tilly Jean Rolston (née Cameron; February 23, 1887 – October 12, 1953) was a Canadian politician. She was the member of the Legislative Assembly (MLA) of British Columbia for Vancouver-Point Grey from 1941 to 1953, and served as minister of education under Premier W. A. C. Bennett from 1952 to 1953.

== Biography ==
Born in Vancouver, she attended the University of British Columbia and the Vancouver Provincial Normal School. She worked as a schoolteacher in Vancouver before marrying Frederick James Rolston in 1909; they had three children together. She served as a director of the Pacific National Exhibition, and as a commissioner on the Vancouver Park Board from 1938 to 1946.

She was first elected to the Legislative Assembly of British Columbia as a Conservative in the 1941 provincial election, becoming one of three MLAs representing Vancouver-Point Grey alongside Royal Maitland and James Alexander Paton, and was re-elected in 1945 and 1949 as part of the Liberal-Conservative coalition. During that time, she served as chairperson of the Select Standing Committee on Social Welfare, and was part of the effort that allowed margarine sold in British Columbia to be coloured yellow. She left the coalition in March 1951 over the government's stance on hospital insurance, and sat in the legislature as an independent MLA before joining W. A. C. Bennett in the British Columbia Social Credit Party (Socred) in February 1952.

With the Socreds forming a minority government following the watershed 1952 election, Rolston was named minister of education in the Bennett ministry, becoming the second woman cabinet minister in British Columbia, and the first woman in Canada to have a portfolio. In that role, she brought in a new method of school finance that came to be known as the "Rolston Formula", and was also instrumental in introducing what was effectively a sex-education program into the school curriculum.

She lost to Liberal leader Arthur Laing in the 1953 election. Despite her defeat, she remained education minister until her death from cancer four months later following an operation; she became the first woman in British Columbia to receive a state funeral.

Her grandson Peter Rolston served as Dewdney MLA from 1972 to 1975.

== Electoral record ==
1945 British Columbia general election: Vancouver-Point Grey
Party	Candidate	Votes	%	Elected
Coalition	Royal Lethington Maitland	22,843	23.39	✓
Coalition	James Alexander Paton	22,281	22.82	✓
Coalition	Tilly Rolston	22,152	22.68	✓
Co-operative Commonwealth	Albert Thomas Alsbury	9,837	10.07	
Co-operative Commonwealth	Francis James McKenzie	8,556	8.76	
Co-operative Commonwealth	George Alfred Isherwood	8,466	8.67	
Labour Progressive	Alexander Lorenzo Gordon	878	0.90	
Labour Progressive	John Goss	830	0.85	
Labour Progressive	William John Gordon Martin	764	0.78	
Social Credit Alliance	Charles Delbert Powell	625	0.64	
Democratic	William Richard Smith	423	0.43	
Total valid votes		97,655	100.00	
Total rejected ballots		597		

1952 British Columbia general election: Vancouver-Point Grey, ballot C
Party	Candidate	Votes 1st count	%	Votes final count	%
Social Credit League	Tilly Rolston	19,236	36.90	25,749	58.75
Liberal	George Stanley Miller	12,087	23.19	18,078	41.25
Co-operative Commonwealth	George Alfred Isherwood	10,451	20.05		
Progressive Conservative	Hattie Pearl Steen	10,356	19.87		
Total valid votes		52,130	100.00	43,827	100.00
Total rejected ballots		4,787			
Note: Preferential ballot; first and final of three (3) counts only shown.

1953 British Columbia general election: Vancouver-Point Grey, ballot C
Party	Candidate	Votes 1st count	%	Votes final count	%
Liberal	Arthur Laing	17,412	34.79	22,730	51.56
Social Credit League	Tilly Rolston	19,061	38.08	21,354	48.44
Co-operative Commonwealth	Frederick Norman Hill	9,441	18.86		
Progressive Conservative	Thomas Frederick Orr	3,607	7.21		
Labour Progressive	Constance Marguerite Marks	338	0.67		
Christian Democratic	Mae Angelique Messner	196	0.39		
Total valid votes		50,055	100.00	44,084	%100.00
Total rejected ballots		2,866			
Note: Preferential ballot; first and final of five (5) counts only shown.
