= 1952 British Columbia general election =

Canadian provincial election

- June 12, 1952

48 seats of the Legislative Assembly of British Columbia 25 seats needed for a majority
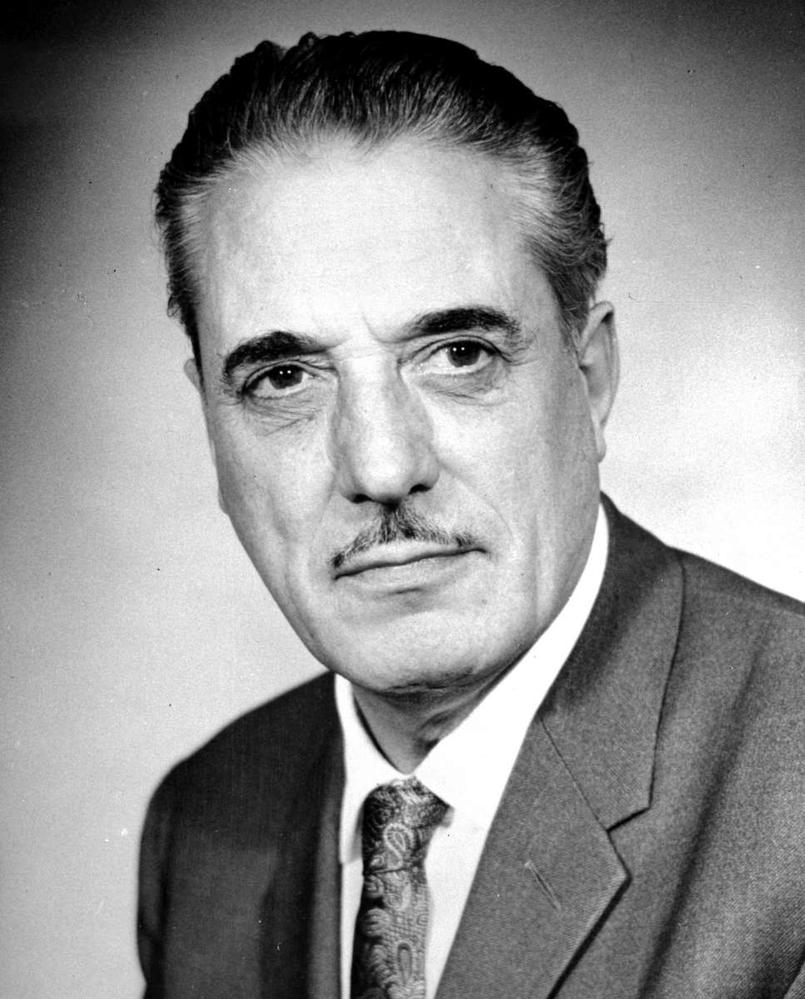

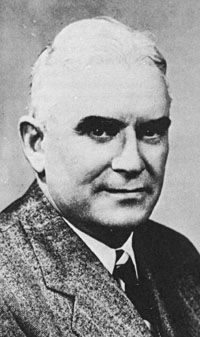
	First party	Second party
	SC
Leader	Ernest George Hansell	Harold Winch
Party	Social Credit	Co-operative Commonwealth
Leader since	1952	1938
Leader's seat	Did not contest	Vancouver East
Last election	0	7
Seats won	19	18
Seat change	▲19	▲11
First count	209,049	236,562
Percentage	27.20%	30.78%
Swing	▲25.99pp	▼4.32pp
Final count	203,932	231,756
Percentage	30.18%	34.3%
	Third party	Fourth party
		PC
Leader	Boss Johnson	Herbert Anscomb
Party	Liberal	Progressive Conservative
Leader since	1947	1946
Leader's seat	New Westminster (lost re-election)	Oak Bay (lost re-election)
Last election	39	39
Seats won	6	4
Seat change	n/a	n/a
First count	180,289	129,439
Percentage	23.46%	16.84%
Swing	n/a	n/a
Final count	170,674	65,285
Percentage	25.26%	9.66%
Premier before election
Byron Ingemar Johnson
Liberal (Note: Johnson led a Liberal–Progressive Conservative coalition government until January 19, 1952; when the coalition fell apart and the Progressive Conservative ministers were excluded from the cabinet. The legislature was dissolved 82 days later on April 10, 1952.)
Premier after election
W. A. C. Bennett (Note: The nominal Socred leader, Ernest George Hansell, was an Alberta member of Parliament and was appointed to lead the British Columbia party during the election but did not contest a seat himself. Following the election, Bennett was elected as the leader of the Social Credit party by the newly-elected caucus and became Premier-elect on July 15, 1952.)
Social Credit

The 1952 British Columbia general election was the 23rd general election in the Canadian province of British Columbia. It was held to elect members of the Legislative Assembly of British Columbia, alongside a plebiscite on daylight saving time and liquor. The election was called on April 10, 1952, and held on June 12, 1952. The new legislature met for the first time on February 3, 1953.

In 1951, the Legislative Assembly passed an act that allowed the use of preferential ballots in the next election. The voting system used was instant-runoff voting (IRV). The presence of multi-member districts, such as Victoria City with 3 MLAs, was handled by an innovation where the district's candidates were split into separate "ballots", each with no more than one candidate from each party, with the member in each being elected by separate use of IRV. The voting age was also lowered from 21 to 19 prior to this election.

Due to the preferential ballot and a large increase in SC support, the election resulted in a surprise victory for the new Social Credit Party. Not even the Socreds had expected to win the election; the party had no official leader, and was nominally led through the election by Ernest George Hansell, an Alberta MP who did not contest a BC seat himself. The newly elected caucus selected W. A. C. Bennett, a former Conservative MLA, to be their leader and premier-designate.

This began what would be 20 years of uninterrupted Social Credit rule in British Columbia, and a period of 39 years overall in which the party would dominate the legislative assembly, interrupted only by an NDP government from 1972 to 1975. This would also be the last election to produce a minority government until the 2017 election.

== Background ==
The government until not long before the election had been a Liberal–Progressive Conservative coalition (the Conservatives had recently changed their name to match that of the federal party). After the coalition had collapsed, the Liberals felt threatened by the rising popularity of the Co-operative Commonwealth Federation. To attempt to lock out the CCF, the government adopted the instant-runoff voting election system instead of leaving the existing system in place or switching to the single transferable vote system that was being used in neighbouring Alberta. The instant-runoff voting election system is a single-winner election system that uses transferable votes. While the Liberal and Conservative parties ran candidates separately under their own names, the leaders of those two parties hoped that if Liberal voters picked the local Tory candidate as their second preference and vice versa, one of the candidates of the two parties would have enough votes to be elected in many districts, hopefully ensuring the retention of power by the former coalition partners.

== Vote count results ==
However, the Liberals and Tories had not reckoned on a sharp drop in support among province's voters. The combined Liberal and PC vote total was 120,000 fewer votes than in the previous election, while Social Credit received almost 200,000 more votes than in 1949. In only eight seat contests did the combined Liberal and Conservative vote total surpass 50 per cent, so even if the party voters had adhered to coalition discipline, in most of the ridings the coalition did not have enough votes to be elected. They received only a comparative few transfers from CCF and SC candidates, whose supporters aided each other where possible.

In districts where CCF candidates were eliminated, back-up preferences were marked overwhelmingly for Social Credit. The Socreds won enough second-preference votes transferred from eliminated Liberal and Conservative candidates to net an additional five seats in addition to the 14 seats where its candidates had a plurality or a majority in the first counts. In the end, the Social Credit party captured 19 seats. The CCF received 18 seats, helped in many cases by transfers from eliminated SC candidates. The coalition was almost wiped out, winning only 10 seats between both parties. Both Premier Byron "Boss" Johnson and Tory leader Herbert Anscomb lost their seats.

Not even the Socreds had expected to win the election. The party had no official leader. Alberta Social Credit Member of Parliament Ernest George Hansell had led the party during the election campaign without contesting a seat himself. The Socreds persuaded independent Labour MLA Tom Uphill to support the party, and so the Socreds were able to form a minority government. (Otherwise, having to provide the Speaker meant that the SC seat total would have been reduced to only the same as the CCF's seat count.)

== Aftermath ==
The party's next task was to choose a leader who would become the province's new premier. In a vote of the newly elected caucus, W. A. C. Bennett, a former Conservative MLA who joined the Socreds after losing a bid for the Tory leadership, won a caucus vote and became premier-designate on July 15, 1952. This began what would be 20 years of uninterrupted Social Credit rule in British Columbia. The party held power for 36 of the following 39 years. It would also be the last British Columbia election to produce a minority government until the 2017 election.

In hopes of getting a stronger mandate, Bennett deliberately lost a confidence vote in 1953. This forced an election in June 1953 in which Social Credit won a majority government.

== Results ==
Elections to the 23rd Legislative Assembly of British Columbia (1952)
Party	Leader	Candidates	First-preference votes				Seats		
Party	Leader	Candidates	Votes	±	% Fpv	±	1949	1952	±
Co-operative Commonwealth	Harold Winch	48	236,562	8,722▼	30.78	4.32▼	7	18 / 48	11▲
Social Credit League	Ernest George Hansell	47	209,049	194,723▲	27.20	25.15▲	–	19 / 48	19▲
Liberal	Boss Johnson	48	180,289	120,045▼	23.46	21.05▼	39	6 / 48	29▼
Progressive Conservative	Herbert Anscomb	47	129,439	120,045▼	16.84	21.05▼	39	4 / 48	29▼
Labour	Tom Uphill	1	1,290	193▼	0.16	0.05▼	1	1 / 48	Steady
Independent		6	1,312	3,851▼	0.17	0.57▼	1	0 / 48	1▼
Christian Democratic		8	7,176	7,176▲	0.93	New			
Labor-Progressive		5	2,514	854▲	0.33	0.09▲			
Labour Representation Committee		1	654	654▲	0.09	New			
Socialist		1	276	276▲	0.04	Returned			
Total		212	768,561		100.00				
Rejected ballots			45,649	35,758▲					
Actual voters who voted			543,456	65,457▲	68.53%	5.11▼			
Registered voters			793,073	144,054▲					

== MLAs elected ==
Alberni: Stanley John Squire
Atlin: Frank Calder
Burnaby: Ernest Winch
Cariboo: Ralph Chetwynd
Chilliwack: William Kenneth Kiernan
Columbia: Richard Orr Newton
Comox: William Campbell Moore
Cowichan-Newcastle: Robert Strachan
Cranbrook: Leo Nimsick
Delta: Thomas Irwin
Dewdney: Lyle Wicks
Esquimalt: Frank Mitchell
Fernie: Thomas Aubert Uphill
Fort George: Llewellyn Leslie King
Grand Forks-Greenwood: Rupert Haggen
Kamloops: Phil Gaglardi
Kaslo-Slocan: Randolph Harding
Lillooet: Ernest Crawford Carson
Mackenzie: Anthony Gargrave
Nanaimo and the Islands: Larry Giovando
Nelson-Creston: Wesley Drewett Black
New Westminster: Rae Eddie
North Okanagan: Lorne Shantz
North Vancouver: Martin Elliott Sowden
Oak Bay: Philip Archibald Gibbs
Omineca: Cyril Morley Shelford
Peace River: Charles William Parker
Prince Rupert: George Edwin Hills
Revelstoke: Vincent Segur
Rossland-Trail: Robert Sommers
Saanich: Frank Snowsell
Salmon Arm: James Allan Reid
Similkameen: Harry Denyer Francis
Skeena: Edward Tourtellotte Kenney
South Okanagan: W. A. C. Bennett
Vancouver-Burrard: Eric Charles Fitzgerald Martin
Vancouver-Burrard: Bert Price
Vancouver Centre: James Campbell Bury
Vancouver Centre: Laura Emma Marshall Jamieson
Vancouver East: Arthur James Turner
Vancouver East: Harold Winch
Vancouver-Point Grey: Albert Reginald MacDougall
Vancouver-Point Grey: George Clark Miller
Vancouver-Point Grey: Tilly Rolston
Victoria City: Nancy Hodges
Victoria City: Daniel John Proudfoot
Victoria City: William Thomas Straith
Yale: Irvine Finlay Corbett

=== Synopsis of results ===
Results by riding – 1952 British Columbia general election (all districts)
Riding	First-preference votes								Final counts						Winning party	
Name	CCF	SC	Lib	PC	Lab	Ind	Oth	Total	#	CCF	SC	Lib	PC	Lab	1949	1952
Alberni	3,067	1,366	2,176	1,204	–	–	196	8,009	4th	4,054	–	3,030	–	–	Ind	CCF
Atlin	595	–	292	164	–	–	–	1,051	Elected on 1st count						CCF	CCF
Burnaby	12,933	6,750	3,816	2,807	–	–	662	26,968	3rd	13,416	7,780	4,919	–	–	CCF	CCF
Cariboo	689	2,684	1,029	775	–	–	–	5,177	Elected on 1st count						Coal	SC
Chilliwack	2,242	8,509	2,543	2,097	–	–	–	15,391	Elected on 1st count						Coal	SC
Columbia	365	841	649	360	–	–	–	2,215	3rd	–	1,174	860	–	–	Coal	SC
Comox	5,369	2,987	3,532	1,868	–	–	–	13,756	3rd	7,098	–	5,210	–	–	Coal	CCF
Cowichan-Newcastle	4,636	1,886	2,711	1,463	–	–	–	10,696	3rd	5,697	–	4,064	–	–	Coal	CCF
Cranbrook	2,688	2,328	1,111	675	–	–	–	6,802	3rd	3,210	3,044	–	–	–	CCF	CCF
Delta	10,853	11,759	4,293	4,688	–	–	–	31,593	3rd	13,295	14,805	–	–	–	Coal	SC
Dewdney	6,024	7,600	3,631	2,233	–	–	–	19,488	3rd	7,248	9,813	–	–	–	Coal	SC
Esquimalt	3,607	1,606 (Note: William Chant was previously a member of the Legislative Assembly of Alberta.)	2,294	1,550	–	–	–	9,057	3rd	4,741	–	3,597	–	–	Coal	CCF
Fernie	612	713	1,117	–	1,290	–	–	3,732	3rd	–	–	1,329	–	1,758	Lab	Lab
Fort George	1,593	2,009	2,022	371	–	–	–	5,995	3rd	–	2,760	2,468	–	–	Coal	SC
Grand Forks-Greenwood	826	292	252	706	–	–	–	2,076	3rd	1,043	–	–	922	–	CCF	CCF
Kamloops	1,311	3,108	2,708	959	–	–	–	8,086	3rd	–	4,002	3,366	–	–	Coal	SC
Kaslo-Slocan	1,411	597	617	522	–	–	–	3,147	3rd	1,792	–	1,000	–	–	CCF	CCF
Lillooet	1,074	450	725	1,301	–	96	–	3,646	4th	1,416	–	–	1,847	–	Coal	PC
Mackenzie	4,230	1,795	3,752	1,285	–	–	–	11,062	3rd	5,373	–	4,669	–	–	Coal	CCF
Nanaimo and the Islands	3,715	951	2,263	3,346	–	–	207	10,482	4th	4,581	–	–	5,144	–	Coal	PC
Nelson-Creston	2,473	2,975	2,572	774	–	–	–	8,794	3rd	–	4,265	3,351	–	–	Coal	SC
New Westminster	4,262	3,616	4,317	2,163	–	–	–	14,358	3rd	6,475	–	5,768	–	–	Coal	CCF
North Okanagan	1,786	4,347	2,104	1,240	–	–	–	9,477	3rd	–	5,447	3,063	–	–	Coal	SC
North Vancouver	6,268	4,947	6,695	4,061	–	216	604	22,791	6th	8,980	–	10,292	–	–	Coal	Lib
Oak Bay	707	1,071	3,631	2,843	–	–	–	8,252	3rd	–	–	4,308	3,282	–	Coal	Lib
Omineca	838	1,137	1,099	574	–	–	–	3,648	3rd	–	1,607	1,437	–	–	Coal	SC
Peace River	1,571	2,178	1,425	278	–	–	–	5,452	3rd	1,865	2,942	–	–	–	Coal	SC
Prince Rupert	2,292	1,104	2,001	687	–	–	–	6,084	3rd	2,903	–	2,754	–	–	Coal	CCF
Revelstoke	942	598	636	555	–	–	–	2,731	3rd	1,320	–	1,015	–	–	Coal	CCF
Rossland-Trail	2,541	3,979	3,331	1,690	–	–	–	11,541	3rd	–	5,917	4,803	–	–	Coal	SC
Saanich	5,862	2,947	4,964	3,407	–	–	–	17,181	3rd	7,867	–	7,599	–	–	Coal	CCF
Salmon Arm	1,236	1,462	669	896	–	–	–	4,263	3rd	1,617	1,979	–	–	–	Coal	SC
Similkameen	3,433	3,344	2,545	1,401	–	–	–	10,723	3rd	4,668	4,712	–	–	–	Coal	SC
Skeena	1,048	501	1,500	586	–	–	–	3,635	3rd	1,318	–	1,865	–	–	Coal	Lib
South Okanagan	2,654	6,082	1,763	1,371	–	–	–	11,870	Elected on 1st count						Coal	SC
Yale	659	1,024	1,067	338	–	60	–	3,148	4th	–	1,390	1,311	–	–	Coal	SC
Vancouver-Burrard (A)	10,037	9,166	6,166	5,765	–	577	1,064	32,775	5th	12,578	13,222	–	–	–	Coal	SC
Vancouver-Burrard (B)	10,397	9,002	6,358	5,615	–	–	1,046	32,418	4th	12,920	13,166	–	–	–	Coal	SC
Vancouver Centre (A)	6,912	4,694	5,234	4,120	–	–	1,321	22,281	5th	9,363	–	7,956	–	–	Coal	CCF
Vancouver Centre (B)	7,350	4,497	5,394	3,951	–	–	967	22,159	5th	9,893	–	8,496	–	–	Coal	CCF
Vancouver East (A)	21,006	11,536	6,574	2,850	–	–	2,304	44,270	4th	21,960	12,433	8,263	–	–	CCF	CCF
Vancouver East (B)	23,051	11,202	5,286	3,045	–	–	2,249	44,833	Elected on 1st count						CCF	CCF
Vancouver-Point Grey (A)	11,267	13,771	13,406	14,042	–	–	–	52,495	3rd	–	20,645	–	22,549	–	Coal	PC
Vancouver-Point Grey (B)	11,366	12,882	12,828	14,886	–	–	–	51,962	3rd	–	18,603	–	24,089	–	Coal	PC
Vancouver-Point Grey (C)	10,451	19,236	12,087	10,356	–	–	–	52,130	3rd	–	25,749	18,078	–	–	Coal	SC
Victoria City (A)	6,008	4,518	8,805	4,362	–	137	–	23,830	4th	8,421	–	12,071	–	–	Coal	Lib
Victoria City (B)	6,329	4,365	7,842	4,608	–	226	–	23,370	4th	8,902	–	11,057	–	–	Coal	Lib
Victoria City (C)	5,975	4,637	8,457	4,601	–	–	–	23,670	3rd	8,511	–	11,762	–	–	Coal	Lib

= Open seat
= Candidate was in previous Legislature
= Incumbent had switched allegiance
= Previously incumbent in another riding
= Not incumbent; was previously elected to the Legislature
= Incumbency arose from by-election gain
= Multiple candidates

=== Analysis ===
Party popularity ranked, numbers of districts
First preference					Final count		
Parties	1st	2nd	3rd	4th	1st	2nd	3rd
█ Co-operative Commonwealth	21	12	10	5	18	14	–
█ Social Credit	14	11	17	5	19	5	–
█ Liberal	9	22	14	3	6	22	2
█ Progressive Conservative	3	3	7	34	4	2	–
█ Labour	1	–	–	–	1	–	–

Party candidates in 2nd place (first preference)
Party in 1st place	Party in 2nd place				Total
Party in 1st place	Socred	CCF	Liberal	PC	Total
Social Credit	–	5	9	–	14
Co-operative Commonwealth	7	–	12	2	21
Liberal	2	6	–	1	9
Progressive Conservative	2	1	–	–	3
Labour	–	–	1	–	1
Total	11	12	22	3	48

1st and 2nd place candidates (final count) by party
Party in 1st place		Total	Party in 2nd place			
Party in 1st place		Total	Socred	CCF	Liberal	PC
	Social Credit	19		8	11	–
	Co-operative Commonwealth	18	4	–	13	1
	Liberal	6	5	–	–	1
	Progressive Conservative	4	2	2	–	–
	Labour	1		–	1	–
Total		48	11	10	25	2

== See also ==
- List of British Columbia political parties
- History and usage of the Single Transferable Vote
