= George Clark Miller =

Canadian politician (1882–1968)

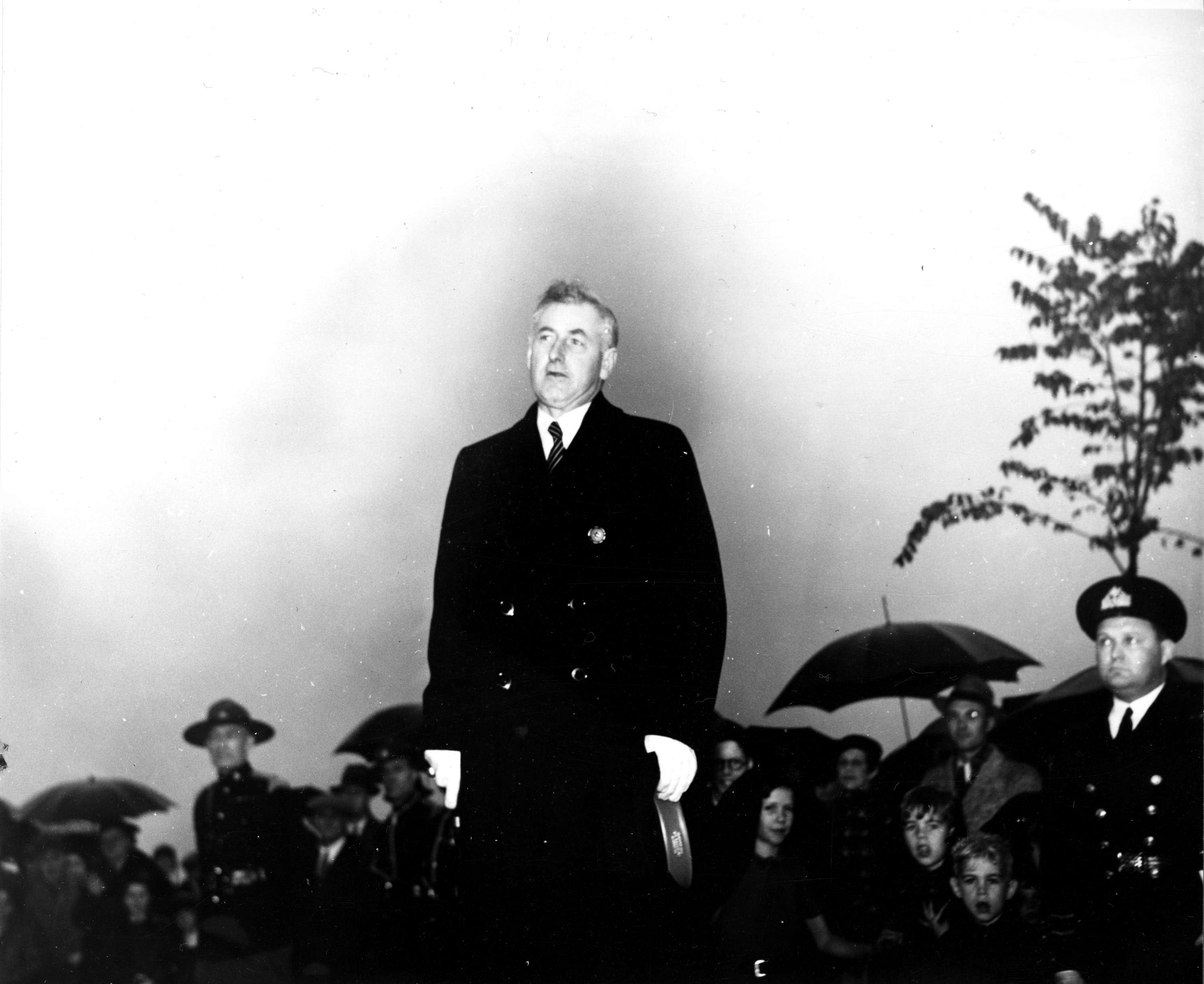
- Miller dedicates foremast from HMS Vancouver, October 1937.

23rd Mayor of Vancouver
- In office 1937–1938
- Preceded by: Gerald McGeer
- Succeeded by: James Lyle Telford

Member of the Legislative Assembly of British Columbia for Vancouver-Point Grey
- In office June 12, 1952 – June 9, 1953 Serving with Albert Reginald MacDougall and Tilly Rolston
- Preceded by: Leigh Stevenson
- Succeeded by: Thomas Audley Bate; Robert Bonner; Arthur Laing

Personal details
- Born: 9 January 1882 Huron County, Ontario, Canada
- Died: 17 March 1968 (aged 86)
- Party: Non-Partisan Association
- Other political affiliations: British Columbia PC

George Clark Miller (9 January 1882 – 17 March 1968) was the 23rd mayor of Vancouver, British Columbia, from 1937 to 1938. He was born in Huron County, Ontario, moving to Manitoba, then to Vancouver.

Gerald McGeer left the mayor's position when he became a member of the House of Commons of Canada. Miller, a city alderman, won the 9 December 1936 city election which featured the first candidates of the Non-Partisan Association. After two years as Vancouver's top local politician, Miller was defeated by James Lyle Telford.

In 1952, Miller was elected to the British Columbia Legislative Assembly, representing Vancouver—Point Grey for the Progressive Conservative Party of British Columbia but was defeated the next year in the 1953 provincial election. He had previously been an unsuccessful candidate in the 1941 provincial election in the riding of Vancouver-Burrard.
