= Stanley McKeen =

Canadian politician (1897–1966)

The Honourable Stanley McKeen

Canadian Senator from British Columbia
- In office January 27, 1947 – December 1, 1966
- Appointed by: William Lyon Mackenzie King

Member of the British Columbia Legislative Assembly for Vancouver-Point Grey
- In office 1933–1937 Serving with George Moir Weir, Robert Wilkinson
- Succeeded by: Royal Maitland

Personal details
- Born: March 18, 1897 New Westminster, British Columbia, Canada
- Died: December 1, 1966 (aged 69) Vancouver, British Columbia, Canada
- Party: Liberal
- Profession: Businessman

Stanley Stewart McKeen (March 18, 1897 – December 1, 1966) was a British Columbia businessman and politician.

== Early life ==
McKeen was born in New Westminster, British Columbia. He founded the family's tugboat business, Straits Towing Limited, and was also chairman of Union Steamships. He also sat on the boards of directors of B.C. Forest Products Ltd, Burrard Dry Dock Ltd. and Decks-McBride Ltd.

== Political career ==
McKeen was elected to the British Columbia Legislative Assembly in the 1933 provincial election as a Liberal MLA for Vancouver-Point Grey but was defeated in the 1937 election. McKeen also helped found the Non-Partisan Association, a centre-right municipal political party in Vancouver, British Columbia which has largely dominated civic politics since the late 1930s.

During World War II he was active helping the government raise money for the war effort and was appointed to the Senate of Canada as a Liberal in 1947 by Prime Minister William Lyon Mackenzie King. McKeen sat in the upper house until his death at the age of 69.

McKeen also served as president of the Vancouver Board of Trade in 1943.

His son, George McKeen, was a prominent Vancouver businessman in his own right.
