= Results of the 1945 Canadian federal election =

1945 Canadian federal election

== Results by province and territory ==
=== Alberta ===
Results in Alberta
Party	Seats	Second	Third	Fourth	Fifth	Votes	%	+/-
Social Credit	13	3	1			113,821	36.63	
Liberals	2	6	5	4		67,662	21.77	
Progressive Conservative	2	3	4	6	1	58,077	18.69	
CCF		5	6	6		57,077	18.37	
Labor-Progressive			1	1	11	14,136	4.55	
Total	17					310,773	100.0	

=== British Columbia ===
Results in British Columbia
Party	Seats	Second	Third	Fourth	Fifth	Sixth	Seventh	Votes	%	+/-
Progressive Conservative	5	3	7					128,529	30	
CCF	4	7	4	1				125,945	29.4	
Liberals	5	6	4					117,737	27.48	
Labor-Progressive				10	1			25,128	5.86	
Social Credit				2	7			9,890	2.31	
Independent Liberal	1							7,348	1.72	
Independent Co-operative Commonwealth Federation	1							6,123	1.43	
Trades Union			1					4,679	1.09	
Democratic				1	1	3		2,603	0.61	
Socialist Labour							2	459	0.11	
Total	16							428,441	100.0	

=== Manitoba ===
Results in Manitoba
Party	Seats	Second	Third	Fourth	Fifth	Sixth	Votes	%	+/-
Liberals	9	6	1				105,716	32.75	
CCF	5	4	7	1			101,892	31.56	
Progressive Conservative	2	5	7	2	1		80,303	24.88	
Labor-Progressive		1	1	3	1		15,984	4.95	
Social Credit			1	3	4		10,322	3.2	
Liberal-Progressive	1						6,147	1.9	
Independent		1				1	2,451	0.76	
Total	17						322,815	100.0	

=== New Brunswick ===
Results in New Brunswick
Party	Seats	Second	Third	Fourth	Votes	%	+/-
Liberals	7	3			100,939	50	
Progressive Conservative	3	6			77,225	38.25	
CCF			8		14,999	7.43	
Independent		1			6,423	3.18	
Independent Liberal				1	2,300	1.14	
Total	10				201,886	100.0	

=== Nova Scotia ===
Results in Nova Scotia
Party	Seats	Second	Third	Fourth	Fifth	Sixth	Seventh	Votes	%	+/-
Liberals	9	3						141,911	45.68	
Progressive Conservative	2	8	2					114,214	36.76	
CCF	1		9	1	1			51,892	16.7	
Labor-Progressive				2		1		1,800	0.58	
Independent							1	488	0.16	
Farmer-Labour				1				362	0.12	
Total	12							310,667	100.0	

=== Ontario ===
Results in Ontario
Party	Seats	Second	Third	Fourth	Fifth	Sixth	Seventh	Votes	%	+/-
Progressive Conservative	48	27	6					751,890	41.44	
Liberals	34	46	1					734,402	40.47	
CCF		6	69	5				260,081	14.33	
Labor-Progressive			2	22	1			36,333	2	
Independent		1	1			1	1	7,946	0.44	
Independent Liberal		1						6,284	0.35	
Bloc populaire			1	1				5,038	0.28	
National Government		1						4,872	0.27	
Social Credit				1	6	1		3,906	0.22	
Farmer-Labour				1				3,258	0.18	
Independent Progressive Conservative						1		295	0.02	
Independent Labour					1			241	0.01	
Total	82							1,814,546	100.0	

=== Prince Edward Island ===
Results in Prince Edward Island
Party	Seats	Second	Third	Fourth	Fifth	Votes	%	+/-
Liberals	3		1			30,696	48.41	
Progressive Conservative	1	3				30,025	47.35	
CCF			2	1	1	2,685	4.23	
Total	4					63,406	100.0	

=== Quebec ===
Results in Quebec
Party	Seats	Second	Third	Fourth	Fifth	Sixth	Seventh	Eighth	Ninth	Tenth	Votes	%	+/-
Liberals	47	8	2	1							657,007	46.46	
Independent	6	23	9	8	4	3	2	1			239,073	16.91	
Bloc populaire	2	14	11	6							167,727	11.86	
Progressive Conservative	1	15	10	3							136,802	9.67	
Independent Liberal	7	1	1	3	1	2	1		1	1	84,143	5.95	
Social Credit		3	15	12	5	6		1			62,832	4.44	
CCF			9	8	8	3	1				33,332	2.36	
Labor-Progressive	1				3	1	1				14,641	1.04	
Independent Progressive Conservative	1	1	2	1	2						14,246	1.01	
Independent Conservative			1								2,653	0.19	
Union of Electors			1								596	0.04	
Labour				1							423	0.03	
Liberal-Labour							1				345	0.02	
Independent Co-operative Commonwealth Federation							1				279	0.02	
Unknown					1						70	0	
Total	65										1,414,169	100.0	

=== Saskatchewan ===
Results in Saskatchewan
Party	Seats	Second	Third	Fourth	Fifth	Sixth	Votes	%	+/-
CCF	18	3					167,233	44.37	
Liberals	2	15	4			1	124,191	32.95	
Progressive Conservative	1	3	13	2			70,830	18.79	
Social Credit			2	6	1		11,449	3.04	
Labor-Progressive			1	2			3,183	0.84	
Total	21						376,886	100.0	

=== Yukon ===
Results in Yukon
Party	Seats	Second	Third	Votes	%	+/-
Progressive Conservative	1			849	40.05	
Labor-Progressive		1		687	32.41	
CCF			1	584	27.55	
Total	1			2,120	100.0	
