= Attorney General Bonner =

Attorney General Bonner may refer to:

- John W. Bonner (1902–1970), Attorney General of Montana
- Robert Bonner (politician) (1920–2005), Attorney General of British Columbia
