= Liberal Party of Canada candidates in the 1968 Canadian federal election =

The Liberal Party of Canada ran 262 candidates in the 1968 federal election, and elected 154 members to form a majority government. Many of the party's candidates have their own biography pages; information about others may be found here. This page also includes information about Liberal Party candidates in by-elections between 1968 and 1972.

== By-elections ==
=== Nanaimo—Cowichan—The Islands, 10 February 1969: Eric W. Winch ===
Eric W. Winch was from a prominent political family in British Columbia. His father, Ernest Winch, was a prominent member of the British Columbia Co-operative Commonwealth Federation, and his brother Harold Winch led the same party in the 1940s and 1950s and was later a New Democratic Party parliamentarian in the House of Commons of Canada. Winch broke with his family's political background, and ran as a candidate of the Liberal Party in 1969. He was forty-five years old and had several years of experience as a senior magistrate and family court judge; it was his first bid for political office. He was endorsed by Larry Giovando, a former Progressive Conservative member of the Legislative Assembly of British Columbia. He received 12,897 votes (37.28%), finishing second against New Democratic Party leader Tommy Douglas.
