= Robert Bonner (politician) =

Canadian politician (1920–2005)

Robert Bonner QC CD

Member of the British Columbia Legislative Assembly for Cariboo
- In office 29 November 1966 – 22 July 1969
- Preceded by: William C. Speare
- Succeeded by: Alex Fraser

Member of the British Columbia Legislative Assembly for Vancouver-Point Grey
- In office 9 June 1953 – 12 September 1966 Serving with Thomas Audley Bate (1953-1963); Arthur Laing (1953-1956); Buda Brown (1956-1962); Pat McGeer (1962-1966); Ralph Loffmark (1963-1966)
- Preceded by: George Clark Miller
- Succeeded by: Garde Gardom

Member of the British Columbia Legislative Assembly for Columbia
- In office 24 November 1952 – 9 June 1953
- Preceded by: Richard Orr Newton
- Succeeded by: Richard Orr Newton

Personal details
- Born: September 10, 1920 Vancouver, British Columbia
- Died: August 12, 2005 (aged 84) Vancouver, British Columbia
- Party: Social Credit
- Spouse: Barbara Newman (m. 1942)
- Education: University of British Columbia (BA 1942, LLB 1948)
- Profession: lawyer

Military service
- Branch/service: Canadian Army
- Years of service: 1942–1953
- Rank: Lieutenant Colonel
- Unit: Seaforth Highlanders of Canada
- Commands: University of British Columbia COTC
- Awards: Canadian Forces' Decoration

Lieutenant Colonel Robert William Bonner QC CD (10 September 1920 – 12 August 2005) was a Canadian lawyer, politician, and corporate executive. He pursued his career working in the British Columbia government and in B.C.-based companies, including as member of the Legislative Assembly (MLA) in the 1950s and 1960s as a Social Credit member, and as cabinet minister under Premier W. A. C. Bennett.

== Background ==
Born and raised in East Vancouver, he was the only child of Emma and Benjamin Bonner, who came to Vancouver from Ireland and New Brunswick respectively. After graduating from Britannia Secondary School, he enrolled in the University of British Columbia (UBC) in 1938, majoring in economics and political science. He also served as vice-president of the UBC Canadian Students Assembly, and later became president of the Literary Science Executive.

With the onset of the Second World War, Bonner enrolled in the Canadian Officers' Training Corps (COTC) in 1940. He graduated with a bachelor of arts degree in 1942, then took part in the Allied invasion of Italy as part of the Seaforth Highlanders. After receiving serious injuries, he convalesced in North Africa and England, then returned to Canada and became chief training instructor with the UBC COTC. He also attended the UBC Faculty of Law; he graduated in 1948 and was called to the British Columbia bar that July, then joined a practice in Vancouver.

He and his wife Barbara had three children.

== Political career ==
Active in politics from an early age, Bonner became a supporter and confidant of Conservative MLA W. A. C. Bennett, and nominated the latter for the Conservative leadership in 1950. Bennett went on to lead the Social Credit Party (Socred) following its victory in the 1952 provincial election, and found himself with a caucus consisting mostly of inexperienced MLAs, none of whom were lawyers; he thus approached the unelected Bonner to serve as Attorney General. Bonner was sworn in on August 1, 1952 along with the rest of the Bennett ministry, and at 31 years old became the youngest Attorney General in B.C.'s history. To provide him with a seat in the legislature, Columbia MLA Richard Orr Newton resigned to trigger a by-election, which was won by Bonner in November 1952.

For the 1953 provincial election, Bonner ran in Vancouver-Point Grey and was elected as one of three MLAs representing the riding. With the Socreds winning its first majority government, Bonner stayed on as Attorney General and would retain the position for the next 15 years, quickly becoming one of the most powerful ministers and closest advisors to Bennett in the Socreds' long spell of governance.

His tenure as Attorney General was marked by legal clashes with First Nations tribes over land and resource rights, especially in light of the rapid hydroelectric, mining, and forestry development of the province's hinterland. Perhaps more significantly, from a historical perspective, was the provincial government's conflicts with the Freedomites (Sons of Freedom), an anti-government religious group resident in the Kootenay region of the province. Clashes over public education led to the apprehension en masse of Freedomite children, and their confinement in a government boarding school.

During his time in cabinet, Bonner also served at various times concurrently as Minister of Education (1953-1954); Minister of Industrial Development, Trade and Commerce (1957-1964); and Minister of Commercial Transport (1964-1968). He proved capable in the legislature, serving as Bennett's House Leader. Contemporaries described him as "articulate, urbane, and always well prepared, with a demonstrated air of superiority and a ready laugh."

Vancouver-Point Grey became a dual-member riding for the 1966 provincial election; Bonner lost his seat by finishing in third place behind Liberal candidates Pat McGeer and Garde Gardom. He returned to the legislature by winning a November 1966 by-election in Cariboo triggered by the resignation of William C. Speare.

== After politics ==
Bonner resigned from his cabinet positions in 1968 to become vice-president of MacMillan Bloedel, a Vancouver-based logging and lumber company, and went on to become the firm's president and chief executive officer; he stayed on as MLA until the end of his term in 1969. After leaving the position of MacMillan Bloedel chairman in 1974, he was appointed in 1976 by Premier Bill Bennett (son of W. A. C. Bennett) as chair of BC Hydro, the provincial crown corporation responsible for producing and supplying hydroelectric power. He resigned from that position in 1985 amidst lawsuits pertaining to his personal affairs, then became partner at the firm Robertson, Ward, Suderman and Bowes.

He died in Vancouver in 2005 at age 84.

== Cabinet positions ==
British Columbia provincial government of William Andrew Cecil Bennett
Cabinet posts (4)
| Predecessor | Office | Successor |
|---|---|---|
| William Kenneth Kiernan | Minister of Commercial Transport; March 20, 1964–May 27, 1968 | Frank Richter |
| Ministry Established | Minister of Industrial Development, Trade and Commerce; March 28, 1957–March 20, 1964 | Ralph Raymond Loffmark |
| Tilly Rolston | Minister of Education; October 19, 1953–April 14, 1954 | Ray Williston |
| Gordon Wismer | Attorney General of British Columbia; August 1, 1952–May 27, 1968 | Leslie Peterson |
