= Vancouver-Point Grey =

Provincial electoral district in British Columbia, Canada

British Columbia electoral district
- Interactive map of riding boundaries

Provincial electoral district
- Legislature: Legislative Assembly of British Columbia
MLA
David Eby
New Democratic
- First contested: 1933
- Last contested: 2026

Demographics
- Population (2021): 56,818
- Area (km²): 41
- Pop. density (per km²): 1,385.8
- Census division: Metro Vancouver
- Census subdivision(s): Vancouver, University Endowment Lands

Vancouver-Point Grey is a provincial electoral district in British Columbia that has been represented in the Legislative Assembly of British Columbia since 1933. Since 2013, the riding has been represented by David Eby, who served as Premier of British Columbia and leader of the New Democratic Party from 2022 to 2026.

== Demographics ==
Population, 2021	56,818
Area (km^{2})	41
Pop. density (people per km^{2})	0.74
Source: BC Electoral Boundaries Commission

== Geography ==
The district comprises the Vancouver neighbourhoods of West Point Grey and the western part of Kitsilano, as well as the adjacent University Endowment Lands and the Point Grey campus of the University of British Columbia.

== History ==
The riding was created out of parts of Richmond-Point Grey, South Vancouver, and Vancouver City, and was first contested in the 1933 general election as a three-member district. It was reduced to a two-member district in 1966 when Vancouver-Little Mountain was created and was further reduced to a one-member district when all remaining multi-member urban districts where converted to one-member districts in the redistribution preceding the 1991 election. When it was a multiple-member district, its seats were filled using plurality block voting, except in 1952 and 1953, when instant-runoff voting was used in a separate contest for each seat.

=== 2023 recall petition ===
In 2023, a petition to recall the district's MLA, David Eby, was approved by Elections BC under the Recall and Initiative Act. However, the petition did not attract the required number of signatures. This was the third invocation of the recall procedure in Vancouver-Point Grey since the act was passed in 1994. (The other two unsuccessful attempts, in 1998 and 2003, both targeted Gordon Campbell.)

== Members of the Legislative Assembly ==
This riding has elected the following members of the Legislative Assembly:

=== Single-member district ===
Assembly	Years	Member	Party
35th	1991–1996	Darlene Marzari	New Democratic
36th	1996–2001	Gordon Campbell	Liberal
37th	2001–2005	Gordon Campbell	Liberal
38th	2005–2009	Gordon Campbell	Liberal
39th	2009–2011	Gordon Campbell	Liberal
39th	2011–2013	Christy Clark	Liberal
40th	2013–2017	David Eby	New Democratic
41st	2017–2020	David Eby	New Democratic
42nd	2020–2024	David Eby	New Democratic
43rd	2024–2026	David Eby	New Democratic
44th	2026–present	David Eby	New Democratic

=== Three-member district ===
Assembly	Years	Seat 1		Seat 2		Seat 3	
Assembly	Years	Member	Party	Member	Party	Member	Party
18th	1933–1937	Stanley McKeen	Liberal	George Moir Weir	Liberal	Robert Wilkinson	Liberal
19th	1937–1941	Royal Maitland	Conservative	George Moir Weir	Liberal	James Alexander Paton	Conservative
20th	1941–1945	Royal Maitland	Conservative	Tilly Rolston	Conservative	James Alexander Paton	Conservative
21st	1945–1946	Royal Maitland	Coalition	Tilly Rolston	Coalition	James Alexander Paton	Coalition
21st	1946–1949	Albert Reginald MacDougall	Coalition	Tilly Rolston	Coalition	Leigh Stevenson	Coalition
22nd	1949–1952	Albert Reginald MacDougall	Coalition	Tilly Rolston	Coalition	Leigh Stevenson	Coalition
23rd	1952–1953	Albert Reginald MacDougall	Progressive Conservative	Tilly Rolston	Social Credit	George Clark Miller	Progressive Conservative
24th	1953–1956	Thomas Audley Bate	Social Credit	Robert Bonner	Social Credit	Arthur Laing	Liberal
25th	1956–1960	Thomas Audley Bate	Social Credit	Robert Bonner	Social Credit	Buda Brown	Social Credit
26th	1960–1962	Thomas Audley Bate	Social Credit	Robert Bonner	Social Credit	Buda Brown	Social Credit
26th	1962–1963	Thomas Audley Bate	Social Credit	Robert Bonner	Social Credit	Pat McGeer	Liberal
27th	1963–1966	Ralph Raymond Loffmark	Social Credit	Robert Bonner	Social Credit	Pat McGeer	Liberal

=== Dual-member district ===
Assembly	Years	Seat 1		Seat 2	
Assembly	Years	Member	Party	Member	Party
28th	1966–1969	Garde Basil Gardom	Liberal	Patrick Lucey McGeer	Liberal
29th	1969–1972	Garde Basil Gardom	Liberal	Patrick Lucey McGeer	Liberal
30th	1972–1974	Garde Basil Gardom	Liberal	Patrick Lucey McGeer	Social Credit
30th	1974–1975	Garde Basil Gardom	Social Credit	Patrick Lucey McGeer	Social Credit
31st	1975–1979	Garde Basil Gardom	Social Credit	Patrick Lucey McGeer	Social Credit
32nd	1979–1983	Garde Basil Gardom	Social Credit	Patrick Lucey McGeer	Social Credit
33rd	1983–1986	Garde Basil Gardom	Social Credit	Patrick Lucey McGeer	Social Credit
34th	1986–1988	Kim Campbell	Social Credit	Darlene Marzari	New Democratic
34th	1989–1991	Tom Perry	New Democratic	Darlene Marzari	New Democratic

== Election results ==
2026 British Columbia general election
The 2026 general election will be held on October 24.
Party	Candidate	Votes	%	±%	Expenditures
New Democratic	David Eby				
Conservative	Alex McMillan				
Green	Beatrice Sharpe				
CentreBC	Michael Davis			–	
Total valid votes / expenses limit					
Total rejected ballots					
Turnout					
Registered voters		TBA			
Source: Elections BC

2024 British Columbia general election
Party	Candidate	Votes	%	±%	Expenditures
New Democratic	David Eby	12,538	56.77	+7.2	$47,403.30
Conservative	Paul Ratchford	7,622	34.51	–	$61,135.35
Green	Devyani Singh	1,925	8.72	–8.9	$5,135.78
Total valid votes / expenses limit		22,085	100.00	–	$71,700.08
Total rejected ballots		40	0.18	–	
Turnout		22,125	63.43	–	
Registered voters		34,880			
New Democratic notional hold		Swing		–	
Note: Change in percentage based on 2020 redistributed results.
Source: Elections BC

2020 provincial election redistributed results
Party	%
New Democratic	49.6
Liberal	32.8
Green	17.5

2020 British Columbia general election
Party	Candidate	Votes	%	±%	Expenditures
New Democratic	David Eby	12,602	51.32	−4.62	$33,547.40
Liberal	Mark Bowen	7,712	31.41	−1.75	$36,024.26
Green	Devyani Singh	4,241	17.27	+7.01	$0.00
Total valid votes		24,555	100.00	–	
Total rejected ballots		96	0.39	−0.01	
Turnout		24,651	59.95	−3.68	
Registered voters		41,122			
New Democratic hold		Swing		−1.44	
Source: Elections BC

2018 British Columbia electoral reform referendum
Side	Votes	%
Proportional representation	9,579	52.89
First Past the Post	8,533	47.11
Total valid votes	18,112	100.0
Total rejected ballots	81	0.45
Source: Elections BC

2017 British Columbia general election
Party	Candidate	Votes	%	±%	Expenditures
New Democratic	David Eby	14,195	55.94	+8.35	$72,150
Liberal	James Lombardi	8,414	33.16	−10.03	$71,630
Green	Amanda Konkin	2,604	10.26	+3.49	$1,525
Independent	Brian Taylor	85	0.34	–	$0
Your Political Party	David Stall	77	0.30	–	$368
Total valid votes		25,375	100.00	–	
Total rejected ballots		101	0.40	+0.12	
Turnout		25,476	63.63	+4.66	
Registered voters		40,037			
Source: Elections BC

2013 British Columbia general election
Party	Candidate	Votes	%	±%
New Democratic	David Eby	11,499	47.59	+2.40
Liberal	Christy Clark	10,436	43.19	-5.54
Green	Françoise Raunet	1,636	6.77	+3.35
Conservative	Duane Nickull	392	1.62	–
Independent	William Gibbens	72	0.30	+0.12
Libertarian	Marisa Palmer	66	0.27	–
Work Less	Hollis Jacob Linschoten	51	0.21	–
Platinum	Bernard Bedu Yankson	11	0.05	–
Total valid votes		24,163	100.00	–
Total rejected ballots		69	0.28	–
Turnout		24,232	58.97	+20.03
New Democratic gain from Liberal		Swing		+3.97
Source: Elections BC

British Columbia provincial by-election, May 11, 2011 Resignation of Gordon Campbell
Party	Candidate	Votes	%	±%	Expenditures
Liberal	Christy Clark	7,757	48.73	-1.65	$98,448
New Democratic	David Eby	7,193	45.19	+4.91	$77,889
Green	Françoise Raunet	545	3.42	-5.36	$309
First	Danielle Alie	379	2.38	–	$35,785
Independent	William Gibbens	28	0.18	–	$388
Independent	Eddie Petrossian	16	0.10	–	$321
Total valid votes		15,918	100	–	
Total rejected ballots		33	0.21	–	
Turnout		15,951	38.94	-17.04	
Liberal hold		Swing		-3.28	

2009 British Columbia general election
Party	Candidate	Votes	%	Expenditures
Liberal	Gordon Campbell	11,546	50.38	$154,282
New Democratic	Mel Lehan	9,232	40.28	$128,634
Green	Stephen Kronstein	2,012	8.78	$1,405
Sex	John Ince	130	0.56	$250
Total valid votes		22,920	100	
Total rejected ballots		134	0.58	
Turnout		23,054	55.98	

2005 British Columbia general election
Party	Candidate	Votes	%	Expenditures
Liberal	Gordon Campbell	12,498	45.98	$181,283
New Democratic	Mel Lehan	10,248	37.70	$62,749
Green	Damian Kettlewell	4,111	15.12	$7,278
Marijuana	Yolanda Perez	138	0.51	$100
Work Less	Tom Walke	126	0.46	$156
Libertarian	Jeff Monds	44	0.16	$100
Platinum	Gudrun Kost	18	0.07	$100
Total valid votes		27,183	100	
Total rejected ballots		130	0.48	
Turnout		27,313	60.94	

2001 British Columbia general election
Party	Candidate	Votes	%	Expenditures
Liberal	Gordon Campbell	13,430	56.14%	$43,396
Green	Varya Rubin	5,094	21.29%	$1,158
New Democratic	Am Johal	4,441	18.57%	$16,995
Marijuana	Alex Curylo	659	2.75%	$394
Unity	Greg Dahms	257	1.07%	$605
People's Front	Anne Jamieson	43	0.18%	$57
Total valid votes		23,924	100.00%	
Total rejected ballots		128	0.54%	
Turnout		24,052	65.80%	

1996 British Columbia general election
Party	Candidate	Votes	%	Expenditures
Liberal	Gordon Campbell	12,637	48.86	$52,970
New Democratic	Jim Green	11,074	42.81	$49,267
Progressive Democrat	Allison Mountstevens	857	3.31	$100
Green	Ralph Maud	683	2.64	$790
Reform	Sager Jan	406	1.57	$100
Natural Law	Ron Decter	76	0.29	$116
Conservative	Michael J.P. Moen	70	0.27	
Family Coalition	E'an P. Rankin	62	0.24	$100
Total valid votes		25,865	100.00	
Total rejected ballots		138	0.53	
Turnout		26,003	71.03	

1991 British Columbia general election
Party	Candidate	Votes	%	Expenditures
New Democratic	Darlene Marzari	12,076	49.26	$61,454
Liberal	Barry Burke	9,022	36.80	$6,832
Social Credit	Richard Wright	2,817	11.49	$24,472
Green	Nicole Kohnert	388	1.58	$41
Independent	Betty Green	138	0.56	$11
Libertarian	Joan Saxton	75	0.31	$412
Total valid votes		24,516	100.00	
Total rejected ballots		367	1.47	
Turnout		24,516	73.50	

== Student vote results ==
Student Vote Canada is a non-partisan program in Canada that holds mock elections in elementary and high schools alongside general elections (with the same candidates and same electoral system).

2024 British Columbia general election
Party	Candidate	Votes	%	±%
New Democratic	David Eby	431	49.94	+7.84
Conservative	Paul Ratchford	216	25.03	–
Green	Devyani Singh	216	25.03	-2.57
Total Valid Votes		863	100.0	–
Source: Student Vote Canada

2020 British Columbia general election
Party	Candidate	Votes	%	±%
New Democratic	David Eby	389	42.10	
Liberal	Mark Bowen	280	30.30	
Green	Devyani Singh	255	27.60	
Total Valid Votes		924	100.0	–
Source: Student Vote Canada

== Electoral history 1933–1986 ==
Note: Winners of each election are in bold.

1933 British Columbia general election
Party	Candidate	Votes	%	Elected
Liberal	George Moir Weir	12,163	16.97	✓
Liberal	Stanley Stewart McKeen	9,880	13.79	✓
Liberal	Robert Wilkinson	9,393	13.11	✓
Co-operative Commonwealth	William Arthur Pritchard	7,693	10.74	
Co-operative Commonwealth	Frank Ebenezer Buck	7,423	10.36	
Co-operative Commonwealth	Dorothy Steeves	7,214	10.07	
Non-Partisan Independent Group	Dugald Donaghy	5,130	7.16	
Non-Partisan Independent Group	George Alexander Walkem	3,694	5.15	
Unionist	William Savage	2,640	3.68	
Unionist	Frederick DeWolfe Turner	2,078	2.90	
Non-Partisan Independent Group	Laura Dickey MacKay	1,731	2.41	
Unionist	Alice Townley	1,434	2.00	
Independent	William McNeill	902	1.26	
United Front (Workers and Farmers)	George Drayton	174	0.24	
Independent Co-operative Commonwealth	Edwin Clarke Appleby	111	0.15	
Total valid votes		71,660	100.00	
Total rejected ballots		608		

19th British Columbia election, 1937
Party	Candidate	Votes	%	±	Expenditures
Conservative	Cyril Gainsborough Beeston	8,809	11.60%		unknown
Co-operative Commonwealth Fed.	John (Jack) Evans	6,382	8.40%		unknown
Liberal	Stanley Stewart McKeen	9,125	12.01%		unknown
Conservative	**Royal Lethington Maitland** (Note: Leader of the Opposition 1937–1941)	**10,580**	**13.93%**		unknown
Co-operative Commonwealth Fed.	William Ralph Offer	6,196	8.16%		unknown
Conservative	**James Alexander Paton**	**9,745**	**12.83%**		unknown
Social Credit League	William Savage	1,001	1.32%	–	unknown
**Liberal**	**George Moir Weir**	**9,235**	**12.16%**		unknown
Co-operative Commonwealth Fed.	Edgar Westmoreland	6,011	7.91%		unknown
Liberal	Robert Wilkinson	8,883	11.69%		unknown
Total valid votes		75,967	100.00%		
Total rejected ballots		472			
Turnout		%			

20th British Columbia election, 1941
Party	Candidate	Votes	%	±	Expenditures
Liberal	Mary Louise Bollert	9,470	9.95%		
Co-operative Commonwealth Fed.	Albert Dawson Gordon	7,603	7.99%		
Co-operative Commonwealth Fed.	Helena Rose Gutteridge	8,183	8.60%		
Emancipation Party	Catherine Emily Ling	265	0.28		
Conservative	**Royal Lethington Maitland**	**14,668**	**15.41%**		
Liberal	Harold Elsdale Molson	8,503	8.94%		
Conservative	**James Alexander Paton**	**14,148**	**14.87%**		
Conservative	**Tilly Rolston**	**13,584**	**14.27%**		
Co-operative Commonwealth Fed.	William Ewart Turner	7,662	8.05%		
Liberal	George Moir Weir	11,073	11.64%		
Total valid votes		95,159			
Total rejected ballots		597			

1945 British Columbia general election
Party	Candidate	Votes	%	Elected
Coalition	Royal Lethington Maitland	22,843	23.39	✓
Coalition	James Alexander Paton	22,281	22.82	✓
Coalition	Tilly Rolston	22,152	22.68	✓
Co-operative Commonwealth	Albert Thomas Alsbury	9,837	10.07	
Co-operative Commonwealth	Francis James McKenzie	8,556	8.76	
Co-operative Commonwealth	George Alfred Isherwood	8,466	8.67	
Labour Progressive	Alexander Lorenzo Gordon	878	0.90	
Labour Progressive	John Goss	830	0.85	
Labour Progressive	William John Gordon Martin	764	0.78	
Social Credit Alliance	Charles Delbert Powell	625	0.64	
Democratic	William Richard Smith	423	0.43	
Total valid votes		97,655	100.00	
Total rejected ballots		597		

British Columbia provincial by-election, June 24, 1946 Deaths of James Alexander Paton and Royal Maitland
Party	Candidate	Votes	%	Elected
Coalition	**Leigh Forbes Stevenson**	14,220	35.44	✓
Coalition	**Albert Reginald MacDougall**	14,076	35.09	✓
Co-operative Commonwealth	Dorothy Gretchen Steeves	5,671	14.14	
Co-operative Commonwealth	George Alfred Isherwood	5,420	13.51	
Democratic	William Richard Smith	415	1.03	
Liberal Industrialist	Peter McAllister	317	0.79	
Total valid votes		40,119		
Source: Elections BC

22nd British Columbia election, 1949
Party	Candidate	Votes	%	±	Expenditures
Co-operative Commonwealth	John Watkins Dunfield	11,980	8.14%		unknown
Co-operative Commonwealth	Margaret Ellen Eckland	11,334	7.71%		unknown
Co-operative Commonwealth	George Alfred Isherwood	11,820	8.04%		unknown
Union of Electors	Cornelius Knight	148	0.10%	–	unknown
Coalition	**Albert Reginald MacDougall**	**36,921**	**25.10%**	–	unknown
Social Credit League	James Alexander Morrison	766	0.52%	–	unknown
Social Credit League	Claude Delbert Powell	591	0.40%	–	unknown
Social Credit League	Helena Ruth Powell	532	0.36%	–	unknown
Coalition	**Tilly Rolston**	**36,410**	**24.75%**	–	unknown
Coalition	**Leigh Forbes Stevenson**	**36,451**	**24.78%**	–	unknown
Union of Electors	Richard Harley Watkins	132	0.09%	–	unknown
Total valid votes		147,085	100.00%		
Total rejected ballots		1,559			
Turnout		%			

For the alternative voting (instant-runoff voting) elections of 1952 and 1953, each of the district's voters were presented with three ballots, one for each seat, with a separate contest for each seat:

1952 British Columbia general election, ballot A
Party	Candidate	Votes 1st count	%	Votes final count	%
Progressive Conservative	**Albert Reginald MacDougall**	14,042	26.75	**22,549**	**52.20**
Social Credit League	Thomas Audley Bate	13,771	26.24	20,645	47.80
Liberal	Theodore Roosvelt Burnett	13,406	25.54		
Co-operative Commonwealth	Victor Wadham Forster	11,267	21.47		
Total valid votes		52,495	100.00	43,194	100.00
Total rejected ballots		4,502			
Note: Preferential ballot; first and final of three (3) counts only shown.

1952 British Columbia general election, ballot B
Party	Candidate	Votes 1st count	%	Votes final count	%
Progressive Conservative	**George Clark Miller**	14,886	28.65	**24,089**	**56.43**
Social Credit League	Claude Delbert Powell	12,882	24.79	18,603	43.57
Liberal	Alexander Whidden Fisher	12,828	24.69	4,919	18.84
Co-operative Commonwealth	Clifford Augustine Greer	11,366	21.87		
Total valid votes		51,962	100.00	42,692	100.00
Total rejected ballots		4,933			
Note: Preferential ballot; first and final of three (3) counts only shown.

1952 British Columbia general election, ballot C
Party	Candidate	Votes 1st count	%	Votes final count	%
Social Credit League	**Tilly Rolston**	19,236	36.90	**25,749**	**58.75**
Liberal	George Stanley Miller	12,087	23.19	18,078	41.25
Co-operative Commonwealth	George Alfred Isherwood	10,451	20.05		
Progressive Conservative	Hattie Pearl Steen	10,356	19.87		
Total valid votes		52,130	100.00	43,827	100.00
Total rejected ballots		4,787			
Note: Preferential ballot; first and final of three (3) counts only shown.

1953 British Columbia general election, ballot A
Party	Candidate	Votes 1st count	%	Votes final count	%
Social Credit League	**Thomas Audley Bate**	19,768	39.77	**22,503**	**52.25**
Liberal	Theodore Roosvelt Burnett	14,612	29.40	20,567	47.75
Co-operative Commonwealth	Victor Wadham Forster	10,058	20.23		
Progressive Conservative	Stewart Leslie Chambers	4,533	9.12		
Labor-Progressive	Beatrice Christine Ferneyhough	348	0.70		
Christian Democratic	Wilfrid Joseph Charbonneau	194	0.39		
Independent	William Norman Kemp	193	0.39		
Total valid votes		49,706	100.00	43,070	100.00
Total rejected ballots		3,205			
Note: Preferential ballot; first and final of six (6) counts only shown.

1953 British Columbia general election, ballot B
Party	Candidate	Votes 1st count	%	Votes final count	%
Social Credit League	**Robert William Bonner**	20,205	40.60	**24,144**	**56.05**
Liberal	Alexander Whidden Fisher	12,022	24.16	18,928	43.95
Co-operative Commonwealth	George James Greenaway	9,556	19.19		
Progressive Conservative	George Clark Miller	7,373	14.81		
Labor-Progressive	Harold John Michael Griffin	337	0.68		
Christian Democratic	Alma Jane Diebolt	212	0.43		
Independent	Abie Louis Seligman	64	0.13		
Total valid votes		49,769	100.00	43,072	100.00
Total rejected ballots		3,150			
Note: Preferential ballot; first and final of six (6) counts only shown.

1953 British Columbia general election, ballot C
Party	Candidate	Votes 1st count	%	Votes final count	%
Liberal	**Arthur Laing**	17,412	34.79	**22,730**	**51.56**
Social Credit League	Tilly Rolston	19,061	38.08	21,354	48.44
Co-operative Commonwealth	Frederick Norman Hill	9,441	18.86		
Progressive Conservative	Thomas Frederick Orr	3,607	7.21		
Labour Progressive	Constance Marguerite Marks	338	0.67		
Christian Democratic	Mae Angelique Messner	196	0.39		
Total valid votes		50,055	100.00	44,084	%100.00
Total rejected ballots		2,866			
Note: Preferential ballot; first and final of five (5) counts only shown.

25th British Columbia election, 1956
Party	Candidate	Votes	%	±	Expenditures
Independent	Ernest Forbes Allistone	959	0.61%		unknown
Progressive Conservative	Reginald Atherton	3,324	2.13%		unknown
Social Credit	**Thomas Audley Bate**	**23,696**	**15.19%**	–	unknown
Social Credit	**Robert William Bonner**	**25,615**	**16.42%**	–	unknown
Progressive Conservative	Ebbie William Bowering	2,878	1.85%		unknown
Social Credit	**Buda Hosmer Brown**	**23,238**	**14.90%**	–	unknown
Liberal	Theodore Roosvelt Burnett	12,924	8.29%		unknown
Liberal	Alexander Whidden Fisher	15,599	10.00%		unknown
Labor-Progressive	Harold John Michael Griffin	318	0.20%		unknown
Co-operative Commonwealth Fed.	Frederick Norman Hill	8,435	5.41%		unknown
Liberal	Arthur Laing	17,801	11.44%		unknown
Co-operative Commonwealth Fed.	Winona Grace MacInnis	11,365	7.29%		unknown
Co-operative Commonwealth Fed.	William James Gibbs Pierce	7,979	5.17%		unknown
Progressive Conservative	Emma Loring Tinsman	1,822	1.69%		unknown
Total valid votes		155,953	100.00%		
Total rejected ballots		561			
Turnout		%			

26th British Columbia election, 1960
Party	Candidate	Votes	%	±	Expenditures
Progressive Conservative	Reginald Atherton	6,774	3.92%		unknown
Social Credit	**Thomas Audley Bate**	**23,950**	**13.86%**	–	unknown
Social Credit	**Robert William Bonner**	**24,273**	**14.04%**	–	unknown
Liberal	Francis Cecil Boyes	17,438	10.09%		unknown
Social Credit	**Buda Hosmer Brown**	**23,583**	**13.65%**	–	unknown
Liberal	Samuel Joseph Dumaresq	15,107	8.74%		unknown
Co-operative Commonwealth Fed.	George Nelson Gibson	12,158	7.03%		unknown
Co-operative Commonwealth Fed.	Clifford Augustine Greer	12,702	7.35%		unknown
Progressive Conservative	Desmond Fife Kidd	6,453	3.73%		unknown
Progressive Conservative	Mary Helen Poaps	4,029	2.33%		unknown
Co-operative Commonwealth Fed.	Thomas Walter Thomason	11,538	6.68%		unknown
Liberal	Leslie Charles Way	14,827	8.58%		unknown
Total valid votes		172,832	100.00%		
Total rejected ballots		803			

British Columbia provincial by-election, December 17, 1962
Party	Candidate	Votes	%
Liberal	Patrick Lucey McGeer	22,055	48.89
Progressive Conservative	Reginald Atherton	9,128	20.24
Social Credit	Eve Burns-Miller	8,575	19.01
New Democratic	Albert E. Anthony Holland	5,350	11.86
Total valid votes		45,108	
Total rejected ballots		256	
Called upon the death of B. H. Brown on 12 August 1962.
Source: http://www.elections.bc.ca/docs/rpt/1871-1986_ElectoralHistoryofBC.pdf

27th British Columbia election, 1963
Party	Candidate	Votes	%	±	Expenditures
Social Credit	Thomas Audley Bate	20,267	11.29%		
Social Credit	**Robert William Bonner**	**23,172**	**12.91%**		
Progressive Conservative	Ernest James (Ernie) Broome	7,643	4.26%		unknown
New Democratic	Amy Dalgleish	8,072	4.50%		unknown
Social Credit	**Ralph Raymond Loffmark**	**20,962**	**11.68%**	–	unknown
New Democratic	John Kendrick Macey	8,663	4.83%		unknown
Progressive Conservative	H. Richardson (Dick) Malkin	7,213	4.02%		unknown
**Liberal**	**Patrick Lucey McGeer**	**25,592**	**14.26%**		unknown
Liberal	Arthur Phillips	16,510	9.20%		unknown
Progressive Conservative	Harry Purdy	15,719	8.76%		unknown
Liberal	Bill Rathie	17,641	9.83%		unknown
New Democratic	William James Whitney	8,018	4.67%		unknown
Total valid votes		179,472	100.00%		
Total rejected ballots		726			
Turnout		%			

28th British Columbia election, 1966 (Note: Seat reduced to two members from three)
Party	Candidate	Votes	%	±	Expenditures
Social Credit	Robert William Bonner	11,494	22.97%	–	unknown
New Democratic	Donald Garth Brown	2,853	5.70%		unknown
**Liberal**	**Garde Basil Gardom**	**13,507**	**26.99%**		unknown
New Democratic	Eduard Marcus Lavallee	2,934	5.11%		unknown
**Liberal**	**Patrick Lucey McGeer**	**17,400**	**30.28%**		unknown
Social Credit	Lawrence Edward Ranta	9,284	16.15%	–	unknown
Total valid votes		57,472	100.00%		
Total rejected ballots		392			
Turnout		%			

29th British Columbia election, 1969
Party	Candidate	Votes	%	±	Expenditures
New Democratic	Alan Frederick Bush	4,268	7.61%		unknown
Progressive Conservative	John Anthony St. Etienne DeWolfe	1,087	1.94%		unknown
**Liberal**	**Garde Basil Gardom**	**13,621**	**24.27%**		unknown
New Democratic	John Kendrick Macey	3,939	6.23%		unknown
**Liberal**	**Patrick Lucey McGeer**	**15,650**	**24.76%**		unknown
Social Credit	Bill Rathie	12,811	20.27%	–	unknown
Social Credit	Charles Randolph Widman	11,820	18.70%	–	unknown
Total valid votes		63,196	100.00%		
Total rejected ballots		258			
Turnout		%			

30th British Columbia election, 1972
Party	Candidate	Votes	%	±	Expenditures
**Liberal**	**Garde Basil Gardom**	**13,673**	**20.72%**		unknown
Progressive Conservative	Ian Bruce Kelsey	5,103	7.73%		unknown
Progressive Conservative	Marianne Linnell	5,696	8.63%		unknown
**Liberal**	**Patrick Lucey McGeer**	**14,599**	**22.13%**		unknown
Social Credit	John George Puil	8,326	12.62%	–	unknown
New Democratic	Paul Sabatino	5,260	7.97%		unknown
Social Credit	Edward Charles Sweeney	8,006	12.13%	–	unknown
New Democratic	Hilda Louise Thomas	5,312	8.05%		unknown
Total valid votes		65,975	100.00%		
Total rejected ballots		387			
Turnout		%			

31st British Columbia election, 1975
Party	Candidate	Votes	%	±	Expenditures
Progressive Conservative	Richard Neill MacLeod Brown	1,340	1.86%		unknown
Progressive Conservative	Theodore Bolton Burgoyne	1,032	1.44%		unknown
Independent	George Henry Does	98	0.14%		unknown
Liberal	Richard John Joseph Durante	5,004	6.96%		unknown
Social Credit	**Garde Basil Gardom**	**20,761**	**28.88%**	–	unknown
Social Credit	**Patrick Lucey McGeer**	**21,192**	**29.48%**	–	unknown
New Democratic	Venkatachala Setty Pendakur	8,932	12.42%		unknown
Liberal	Moyra Anne Roberts	4,383	6.10%		unknown
New Democratic	Hilda Louise Thomas	9,143	12.72%		unknown
Total valid votes		71,885	100.00%		
Total rejected ballots		554			
Turnout		%			

32nd British Columbia election, 1979
Party	Candidate	Votes	%	±	Expenditures
Progressive Conservative	William Fairley	2,511	3.17%		unknown
Social Credit	**Garde Basil Gardom**	**20,620**	**26.05%**	–	unknown
Progressive Conservative	Elizabeth L. Green	2,437	3.08%		unknown
Social Credit	**Patrick Lucey McGeer**	**19,789**	**25.00%**	–	unknown
Liberal	Timothy Charles O'Brien	1,399	1.77%		unknown
New Democratic	Tom Shandel	15,686	19.82%		unknown
Liberal	Christopher Keith Sumner	1,131	1.43%		unknown
New Democratic	Hilda Louise Thomas	15,578	19.68%		unknown
Total valid votes		79,151	100.00%		
Total rejected ballots		1,274			
Turnout		%			

33rd British Columbia election, 1983
Party	Candidate	Votes	%	±	Expenditures
Liberal	Leopold Auer	1,675	1.98%		unknown
Green	Adriane Janice Carr	1,549	1.83%	–	unknown
Social Credit	**Garde Basil Gardom**	**22,550**	**26.58%**	–	unknown
Social Credit	**Patrick Lucey McGeer**	**22,970**	**27.08%**	–	unknown
Progressive Conservative	Lorne Neil MacLean	1,573	1.86%		unknown
New Democratic	Maureen Patricia Marchak	16,612	19.58%		unknown
New Democratic	Hilda Louise Thomas	15,849	18.68%		unknown
Progressive Conservative	William Fairley	2,511	3.17%		unknown
Liberal	Allan Edward Warnke	2,048	2.41%		unknown
Total valid votes		84,826	100.00%		
Total rejected ballots		480			
Turnout		%			

34th British Columbia election, 1986
Party	Candidate	Votes	%	±	Expenditures
Liberal	Doreen Braverman	6,680	7.88%		
Liberal	Thomas Airlie Brown	5,505	6.49%		
Social Credit	**Kim Campbell**	**19,716**	**23.24%**		
Green	Douglas Dunn	498	0.59%		
New Democratic	Richard J. {Dick) Gathercole	15,729	18.55%		
Social Credit	Patrick Lucey McGeer	18,256	21.52%	–	unknown
New Democratic	**Darlene R. Marzari**	**18,311**	**21.59%**		
People's Front	Allen Harvey Soroka	120	0.14%		
Total valid votes		84,815			
Total rejected ballots		682			

In 1988, Kim Campbell resigned as the MLA to run in the federal election. Tom Perry (NDP) won the seat in the 1989 by-election, finishing the term with Marzari as his seatmate. A redistribution before the 1991 election substantially changed Vancouver's electoral map by converting all remaining multiple member districts into single-member ones. Vancouver-Point Grey was trimmed, with parts of the district going to the creation of Vancouver-Quilchena, Vancouver-Langara, and Vancouver-Burrard (mostly to Quilchena). In the 1991 election, Perry changed ridings and was elected in Vancouver-Little Mountain.

British Columbia provincial by-election, March 15, 1989 Resignation of Kim Campbell
Party	Candidate	Votes	%	±%
New Democratic	Tom Perry	14,132	52.91	–
Social Credit	Michael Levy	6,435	24.09	–
Liberal	Gordon Wilson	5,449	20.40	–
Green	Valerie Parker	535	2.00	–
Independent	Bob Seeman	77	0.29	–
Libertarian	Mary Anne Nylen	58	0.22	–
Human Race	Louis Lesosky	16	0.06	–
New Populist	Gerald Kirby	8	0.03	–
Total valid votes		26,710	99.64	–
Total rejected ballots		96	0.36	–
Turnout		26,806	46.37	–
Eligible voters		57,813	–	
New Democratic **gain**		Swing		–
Source: Elections BC

== See also ==
- List of British Columbia provincial electoral districts
- Canadian provincial electoral districts

== Notes ==
Legislative Assembly of British Columbia
Preceded by Vancouver-Kensington	Constituency represented by the premier 2001–2013	Succeeded by Westside-Kelowna
Preceded by Langford-Juan de Fuca	Constituency represented by the premier Since 2022	Incumbent
