= George Weir =

George Weir may refer to:

- George Weir (Australian politician) (1903–1956), Australian barrister and politician
- George Alexander Weir (1876–1951), British Army officer
- Doddie Weir (George Wilson Weir, 1970–2022), Scottish rugby union player
- George Moir Weir (1885–1949), British Columbia educator and politician
