= 1952 British Columbia plebiscite =

A two-part plebiscite was held in British Columbia on 12 June 1952, alongside provincial elections. Voters were asked whether they approved of continuing with daylight saving time and allowing liquor and wine to be sold in licensed premises. Both proposals were approved.

== Background ==
Daylight saving time had been introduced in British Columbia on 6 July 1941. Despite opposition from farmers, the federal government subsequently implemented daylight saving across the country until World War II ended. At the end of the conflict, the provincial government decided to retain the system. However, amidst continuing opposition from farmers, in March 1952, they opted to put the matter to a public vote.

A 1916 referendum had seen a vote in favour of introducing prohibition in British Columbia, whilst a second referendum in 1920 resulted in prohibition being rejected in favour of a government-administered board becoming responsible for overseeing the retail sale of liquor in government-approved stores. However, the sale of alcohol in bars remained banned. Another referendum in 1924 allowed beer to be sold by the glass in bars, but wine and liquor could still only be sold in approved stores.

== Results ==
Question	For		Against		Invalid/ blank	Total	Registered voters	Turnout	Outcome
Question	Votes	%	Votes	%	Invalid/ blank	Total	Registered voters	Turnout	Outcome
Continuing with daylight saving time	290,353	55.69	231,008	44.31	20,828	542,189			Approved
Allowing wine and liquor to be sold in glasses	315,533	60.53	205,736	39.47	20,856	542,115			Approved
Source: Boyer, Adams
