= 1953 British Columbia general election =

Canadian provincial election

- June 9, 1953

48 seats of the Legislative Assembly of British Columbia 25 seats needed for a majority
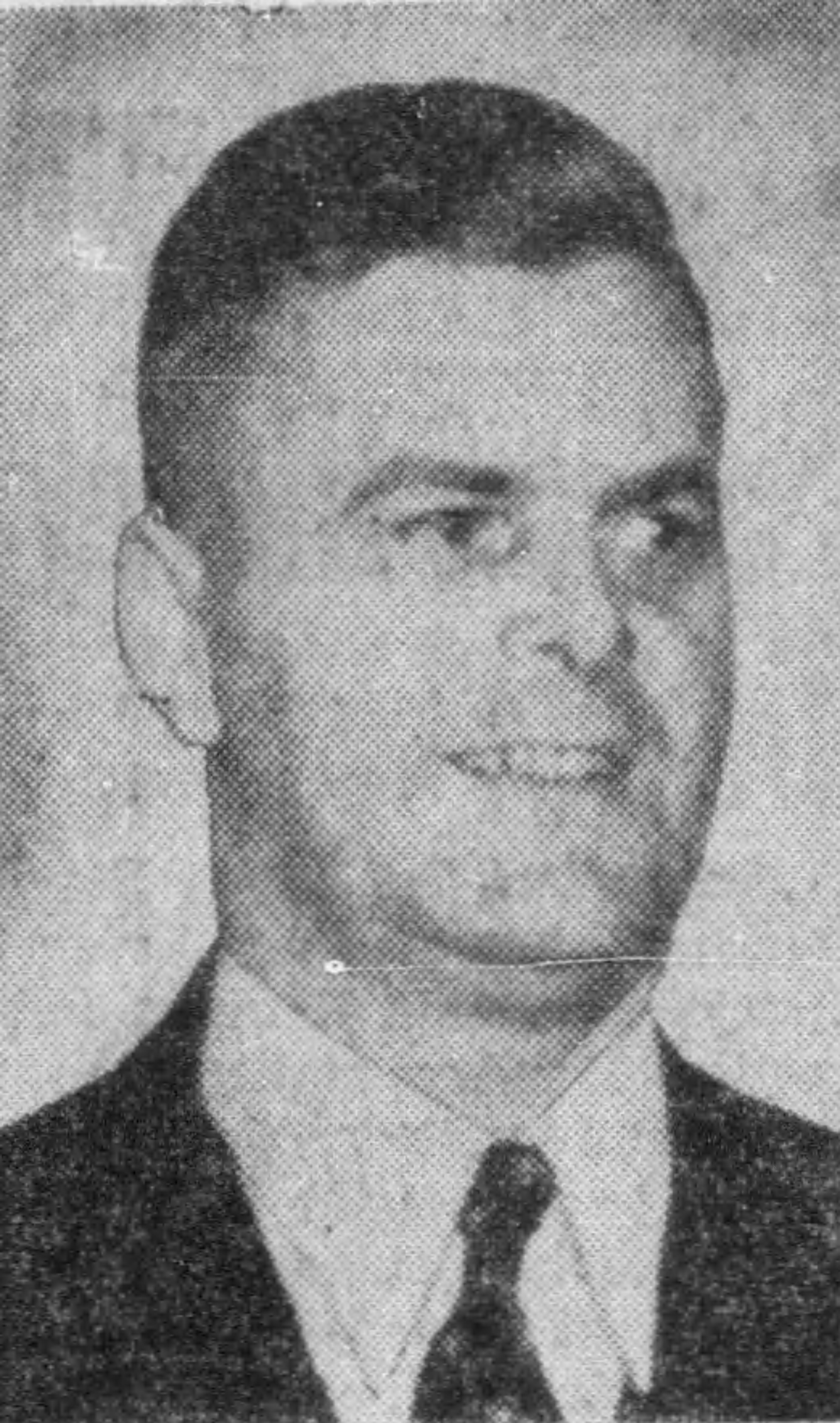

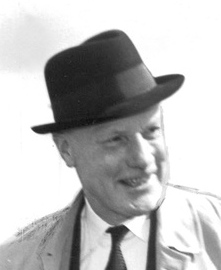
	First party	Second party
		CCF
Leader	W. A. C. Bennett	Arnold Webster
Party	Social Credit	Co-operative Commonwealth
Leader since	1952	1953
Leader's seat	South Okanagan	Vancouver East
Last election	19	18
Seats won	28	14
Seat change	▲9	▼4
First count	274,771	224,513
Percentage	37.75%	30.85%
Swing	▲10.55pp	▲0.07pp
Final count	300,372	194,414
Percentage	45.54%	29.48%
	Third party	Fourth party
		PC
Leader	Arthur Laing	Deane Finlayson
Party	Liberal	Progressive Conservative
Leader since	1953	1952
Leader's seat	Vancouver-Point Grey	Ran in Oak Bay (lost)
Last election	6	4
Seats won	4	1
Seat change	▼2	▼3
First count	171,671	40,780
Percentage	23.59%	5.60%
Swing	▲0.13pp	▼11.24pp
Final count	154,090	7,326
Percentage	23.36%	1.11%
Premier before election
W. A. C. Bennett
Social Credit
Premier after election
W. A. C. Bennett
Social Credit

The 1953 British Columbia general election was the 24th general election in the Province of British Columbia, Canada. It was held to elect members of the Legislative Assembly of British Columbia. The election was called on April 10, 1953, and held on June 9, 1953. The new legislature met for the first time on September 15, 1953.

The minority government formed in 1952 by the conservative Social Credit party of Premier W.A.C. Bennett lasted only nine months before new elections were called. Social Credit was re-elected with a majority in the legislature to a second term in government with almost 38% of the popular vote.

The social democratic Co-operative Commonwealth Federation formed the official opposition with the only significant opposition caucus (14 seats).

The British Columbia Liberal Party had a net loss of two of its six seats despite maintaining its 23% share of the popular vote. They lost five of the six seats they had won in 1952, but picked up three new seats.

The Progressive Conservative Party lost three of its four seats in the legislature, as its share of the popular vote fell from almost 17% to under 6%.

One seat was won by a Labour candidate.

== Results ==
Elections to the 24th Legislative Assembly of British Columbia (1953)
Party	Leader	Candidates	First Preference Votes				Seats		
Party	Leader	Candidates	Votes	±	% FPv	±	1952	1953	±
Social Credit League	W. A. C. Bennett	48	274,771	65,722▲	37.75	10.55▲	19	28 / 48	9▲
Co-operative Commonwealth	Arnold Webster	47	224,513	12,049▼	30.85	0.07▲	18	14 / 48	4▼
Liberal	Arthur Laing	48	171,761	8,528▼	23.59	0.13▲	6	4 / 48	2▼
Progressive Conservative	Deane Finlayson	39	40,780	88,659▼	5.60	11.24▼	4	1 / 48	3▼
Labour	Tom Uphill	1	1,601	311▲	0.22	0.06▲	1	1 / 48	Steady
Labor-Progressive		25	7,496	4,982▲	1.03	0.70▲			
Christian Democratic		14	5,036	2,140▼	0.69	0.24▼			
Independent (Note: Includes a People's Party of BC candidate in Delta.)		7	1,971	659▲	0.27	0.10▲			
Total		229	727,839		100.00				
Rejected ballots			43,766	1,883▼					
Actual voters who voted			522,052	21,404▼	70.55%	2.02▲			
Registered voters			740,006	53,067▼					

== MLAs elected ==
Alberni: Stanley John Squire
Atlin: Frank Calder
Burnaby: Ernest Winch
Cariboo: Ralph Chetwynd
Chilliwack: William Kenneth Kiernan
Columbia: Richard Orr Newton
Comox: William Campbell Moore
Cowichan-Newcastle: Robert Strachan
Cranbrook: Leo Nimsick
Delta: Thomas Irwin
Dewdney: Lyle Wicks
Esquimalt: Herbert Joseph Bruch
Fernie: Thomas Aubert Uphill
Fort George: Ray Williston
Grand Forks-Greenwood: Rupert Haggen
Kamloops: Phil Gaglardi
Kaslo-Slocan: Randolph Harding
Lillooet: James Gordon Gibson
Mackenzie: Anthony Gargrave
Nanaimo and the Islands: Larry Giovando
Nelson-Creston: Wesley Drewett Black
New Westminster: Rae Eddie
North Okanagan: Lorne Shantz
North Vancouver: George Henry Tomlinson Jr.
Oak Bay: Philip Archibald Gibbs
Omineca: Cyril Morley Shelford
Peace River: Charles William Parker
Prince Rupert: Arthur Bruce Brown
Revelstoke: Vincent Segur
Rossland-Trail: Robert Sommers
Saanich: John Douglas Tisdalle
Salmon Arm: James Allan Reid
Similkameen: Frank Richter, Jr.
Skeena: Frank Howard
South Okanagan: W. A. C. Bennett
Vancouver-Burrard: Eric Charles Fitzgerald Martin
Vancouver-Burrard: Bert Price
Vancouver Centre: Alexander Small Matthew
Vancouver Centre: George Churchill Moxham
Vancouver East: Arthur James Turner
Vancouver East: Arnold Alexander Webster
Vancouver-Point Grey: Thomas Audley Bate
Vancouver-Point Grey: Robert Bonner
Vancouver-Point Grey: Arthur Laing
Victoria City: Lydia Arsens
Victoria City: William Chant
Victoria City: Walter Percival Wright
Yale: Irvine Finlay Corbett

=== Synopsis of results ===
Results by riding - 1953 British Columbia general election (all districts)
Riding	First preference votes									Final counts							Winning party	
Name	SC	CCF	Lib	PC	Lab	LPP	CDP	Ind	Total	#	SC	CCF	Lib	PC	Lab	CDP	1952	1953
Alberni	1,637	3,116	2,022	320	–	139	–	–	7,234	4th	–	3,715	2,811	–	–	–	CCF	CCF
Atlin	108	553	275	–	–	–	–	–	936	Elected on 1st count							CCF	CCF
Burnaby	8,151	12,689	3,351	641	–	367	396	–	25,595	2nd	8,161	12,947	3,364	646	–	401	CCF	CCF
Cariboo	2,733	992	1,050	509	–	–	–	–	5,284	Elected on 1st count							SC	SC
Chilliwack	8,776	2,456	2,631	589	–	–	–	–	14,452	Elected on 1st count							SC	SC
Columbia	924 (Note: Richard Orr Newton had resigned in order to provide a seat for Robert Bonner. Bonner stood for election in Vancouver-Point Grey in 1953, while Newton sought reelection in his old seat.)	481	676	80	–	–	–	–	2,161	3rd	1,038	–	787	–	–	–	SC	SC
Comox	4,420	5,462	2,944	378	–	357	–	–	13,561	4th	5,762	6,717	–	–	–	–	CCF	CCF
Cowichan-Newcastle	2,686	4,517	2,330	510	–	168	–	118	10,329	5th	3,878	5,345	–	–	–	–	CCF	CCF
Cranbrook	2,219	2,955	1,615	–	–	–	–	–	6,789	2nd	2,756	3,460	–	–	–	–	CCF	CCF
Delta	13,079	11,095	5,500	591	–	390	315	20	30,990	6th	15,417	13,108	–	–	–	–	SC	SC
Dewdney	7,307	7,003	3,715	559	–	250	72	–	18,906	5th	9,066	8,310	–	–	–	–	SC	SC
Esquimalt	3,264	3,089	1,998	480	–	–	–	–	8,831	3rd	4,147	3,848	–	–	–	–	CCF	SC
Fernie	702	–	1,229	–	1,601	–	–	–	3,532	2nd	–	–	1,402	–	1,793	–	Lab	Lab
Fort George	3,160	1,677	1,802	–	–	–	–	–	6,639	Elected on 1st count							SC	SC
Grand Forks-Greenwood	583	995	324	177	–	–	–	–	2,079	2nd	618	1,016	393	–	–	–	CCF	CCF
Kamloops	4,037	1,368	2,272	427	–	80	–	–	8,184	3rd	4,171	1,434	2,503	–	–	–	SC	SC
Kaslo-Slocan	867	1,481	792	–	–	–	–	–	3,140	2nd	1,165	1,692	–	–	–	–	CCF	CCF
Lillooet	1,065	1,372	1,103	452	–	–	–	–	3,992	3rd	–	1,694	1,830	–	–	–	PC	Lib
Mackenzie	2,687	4,468	3,397	230	–	–	–	–	10,782	3rd	–	5,191	4,497	–	–	–	CCF	CCF
Nanaimo and the Islands	2,626	3,631	1,375	2,046	–	115	–	32	9,825	5th	–	4,358	–	4,376	–	–	PC	PC
Nelson-Creston	3,450	2,636	1,803	772	–	99	–	–	8,760	4th	4,199	3,404	–	–	–	–	SC	SC
New Westminster	3,787	4,903	4,309	–	–	157	89	–	13,245	4th	–	5,970	5,658	–	–	–	CCF	CCF
North Okanagan	4,398	1,749	2,071	700	–	90	–	–	9,008	3rd	4,578	1,868	2,407	–	–	–	SC	SC
North Vancouver	7,728	5,820	6,377	1,338	–	217	182	–	21,662	5th	9,291	–	9,134	–	–	–	Lib	SC
Oak Bay	3,280	508	3,182	1,220	–	–	–	–	8,190	3rd	3,681	–	4,110	–	–	–	Lib	Lib
Omineca	1,390	952	1,145	172	–	–	–	–	3,659	3rd	1,612	–	1,379	–	–	–	SC	SC
Peace River	2,481	1,921	1,378	–	–	–	–	–	5,780	2nd	3,022	2,216	–	–	–	–	SC	SC
Prince Rupert	1,731	2,074	1,864	–	–	–	–	–	5,669	2nd	–	2,578	2,611	–	–	–	CCF	Lib
Revelstoke	639	1,009	551	–	–	–	–	522	2,721	3rd	–	1,284	1,012	–	–	–	CCF	CCF
Rossland-Trail	4,182	3,470	2,899	621	–	–	–	–	11,172	3rd	5,778	4,549	–	–	–	–	SC	SC
Saanich	6,681	5,037	4,256	990	–	–	–	–	16,964	3rd	8,876	6,466	–	–	–	–	CCF	SC
Salmon Arm	1,627	1,341	623	600	–	101	–	–	4,292	4th	2,013	1,806	–	–	–	–	SC	SC
Similkameen	4,465	3,419	2,109	323	–	–	–	–	10,316	3rd	5,418	4,105	–	–	–	–	SC	SC
Skeena	1,372	1,768	1,413	220	–	–	–	–	4,773	3rd	–	2,110	2,097	–	–	–	Lib	CCF
South Okanagan	6,756	2,427	1,961	403	–	–	–	–	11,547	Elected on 1st count							SC	SC
Yale	1,177	835	834	107	–	–	–	–	2,953	3rd	1,354	–	1,137	–	–	–	SC	SC
Vancouver-Burrard (A)	11,527	9,216	5,936	1,259	–	360	658	–	28,956	5th	14,924	11,360	–	–	–	–	SC	SC
Vancouver-Burrard (B)	11,273	9,323	5,858	1,276	–	367	643	–	28,740	5th	14,674	11,446	–	–	–	–	SC	SC
Vancouver Centre (A)	7,066	6,238	4,079	971	–	572	505	–	19,431	5th	9,016	7,757	–	–	–	–	CCF	SC
Vancouver Centre (B)	6,782	6,283	3,985	1,007	–	580	480	–	19,117	5th	8,679	7,707	–	–	–	–	CCF	SC
Vancouver East (A)	13,225	19,475	5,272	747	–	842	743	–	40,304	4th	13,872	19,942	5,796	–	–	–	CCF	CCF
Vancouver East (B)	12,910	20,583	4,727	803	–	816	351	–	40,190	Elected on 1st count							CCF	CCF
Vancouver-Point Grey (A)	19,768	10,058	14,612	4,533	–	348	194	193	49,706	5th	22,503	–	20,567	–	–	–	PC	SC
Vancouver-Point Grey (B)	20,205	9,556	12,022	7,373	–	337	212	64	49,769	6th	24,144	–	18,928	–	–	–	PC	SC
Vancouver-Point Grey (C)	19,061	9,441	17,412	3,607	–	338	196	–	50,055	5th	21,354	–	22,730	–	–	–	SC	Lib
Victoria City (A)	8,616	4,881	6,915	1,227	–	126	–	1,022	22,787	5th	9,999	–	8,869	–	–	–	Lib	SC
Victoria City (B)	9,131 (Note: William Chant was previously a member of the Legislative Assembly of Alberta.)	5,267	6,484	1,383	–	153	–	–	22,418	4th	10,330	–	8,344	–	–	–	Lib	SC
Victoria City (C)	9,032	4,923	7,193	1,139	–	127	–	–	22,414	4th	10,084	–	8,907	–	–	–	Lib	SC

= open seat
= candidate was in previous Legislature
= incumbent had switched allegiance
= previously incumbent in another riding
= not incumbent; was previously elected to the Legislature
= incumbency arose from byelection gain
= previously an MP in the House of Commons of Canada
= multiple candidates

=== Analysis ===
Parties ranked by preference
First preference						Final count				
Parties	1st	2nd	3rd	4th	5th	1st	2nd	3rd	4th	5th
█ Social Credit	30	10	8	–	–	28	10	1	–	–
█ Co-operative Commonwealth	17	15	14	1	–	14	17	5	–	–
█ Liberal	–	23	24	1	–	4	21	5	–	–
█ Progressive Conservative	–	–	2	35	2	1	–	–	4	1
█ Labour	1	–	–	–	–	1	–	–	–	–
█ Labor-Progressive	–	–	–	3	18	–	–	–	1	–
█ Christian Democratic	–	–	–	–	4	–	–	–	–	1
█ Independent	–	–	–	1	1	–	–	–	–	–

Party candidates in 2nd place (first preference)
Party in 1st place	Party in 2nd place			Total
Party in 1st place	Socred	CCF	Liberal	Total
Social Credit	–	15	15	30
Co-operative Commonwealth	10	–	7	17
Labour	–	–	1	1
Total	10	15	23	48

Party candidates in 2nd place (final count)
Party in 1st place	Party in 2nd place			Total
Party in 1st place	Socred	CCF	Liberal	Total
Social Credit	–	14	14	28
Co-operative Commonwealth	8	–	6	14
Liberal	2	2	–	4
Progressive Conservative	–	1	–	1
Labour	–	–	1	1
Total	10	17	21	1

== See also ==
- List of British Columbia political parties
- History and use of the Single Transferable Vote
