= Arthur Laing =

Canadian politician (1904–1975)

The Honourable Arthur Laing PC
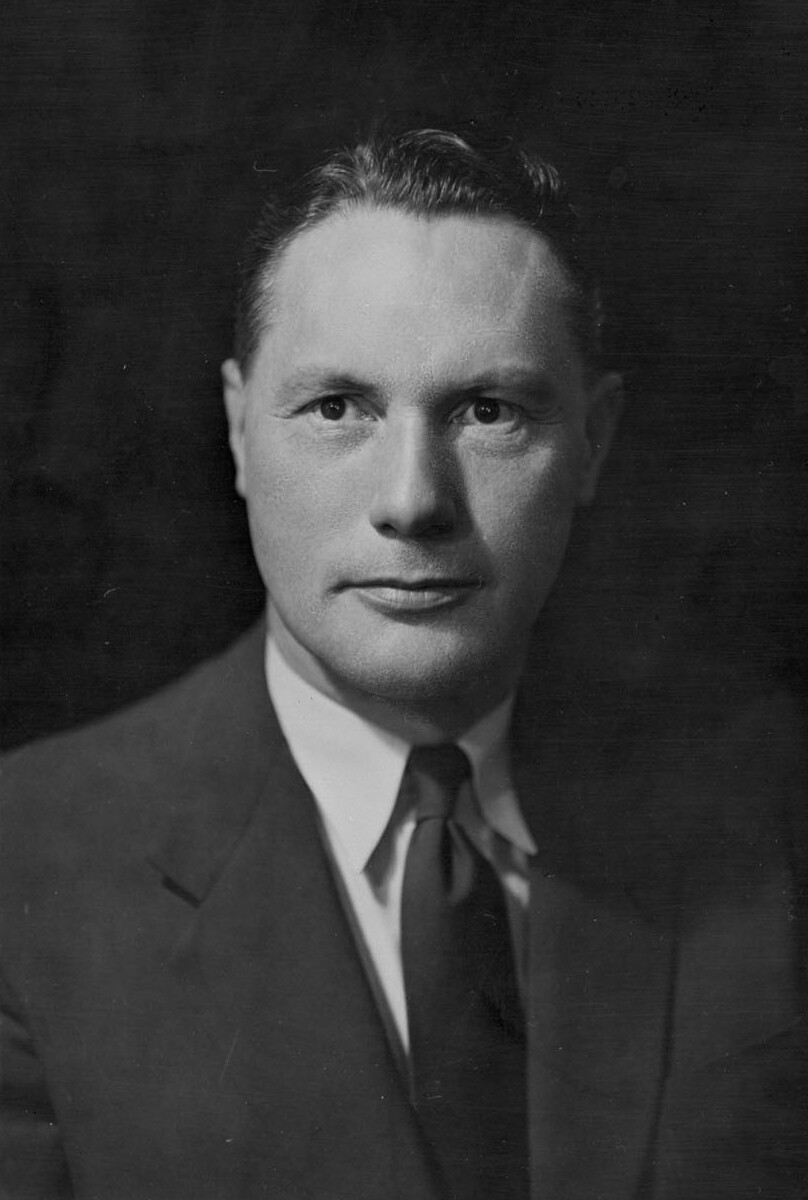
- Laing, c. 1940s

Minister of Public Works
- In office July 5, 1968 – January 27, 1972
- Prime Minister: Pierre Trudeau
- Preceded by: George James McIlraith
- Succeeded by: Jean-Eudes Dubé
Ministerial positions
Minister of Veterans Affairs
In office January 28, 1972 – November 26, 1972
Prime Minister	Pierre Trudeau
Preceded by	Jean-Eudes Dubé
Succeeded by	Daniel J. MacDonald
Minister of Indian Affairs and Northern Development
In office October 1, 1966 – July 5, 1968
Prime Minister	Lester B. Pearson; Pierre Trudeau
Preceded by	Jean Marchand
Succeeded by	Jean Chrétien
Minister of Northern Affairs and National Resources
In office December 22, 1963 – September 30, 1966
Prime Minister	Lester B. Pearson
Preceded by	Walter Dinsdale
Succeeded by	Himself (Indian Affairs and Northern Development)

Leader of the British Columbia Liberal Party
- In office April 8, 1953 – May 16, 1959
- Preceded by: Boss Johnson
- Succeeded by: Ray Perrault

Member of Parliament for Vancouver South
- In office June 27, 1949 – April 30, 1953
- Preceded by: Howard Charles Green
- Succeeded by: Elmore Philpott
- In office June 18, 1962 – August 31, 1972
- Preceded by: Ernest James Broome
- Succeeded by: John Allen Fraser

Member of the Legislative Assembly of British Columbia for Vancouver-Point Grey
- In office June 9, 1953 – September 19, 1956 Serving with Thomas Audley Bate
- Preceded by: Albert Reginald MacDougall and George Clark Miller
- Succeeded by: Thomas Audley Bate and Buda Brown

Personal details
- Born: September 9, 1904 Eburne, British Columbia, Canada
- Died: 13 February 1975 (aged 70)
- Party: Liberal; BC Liberal
- Spouse: Geraldine Hyland

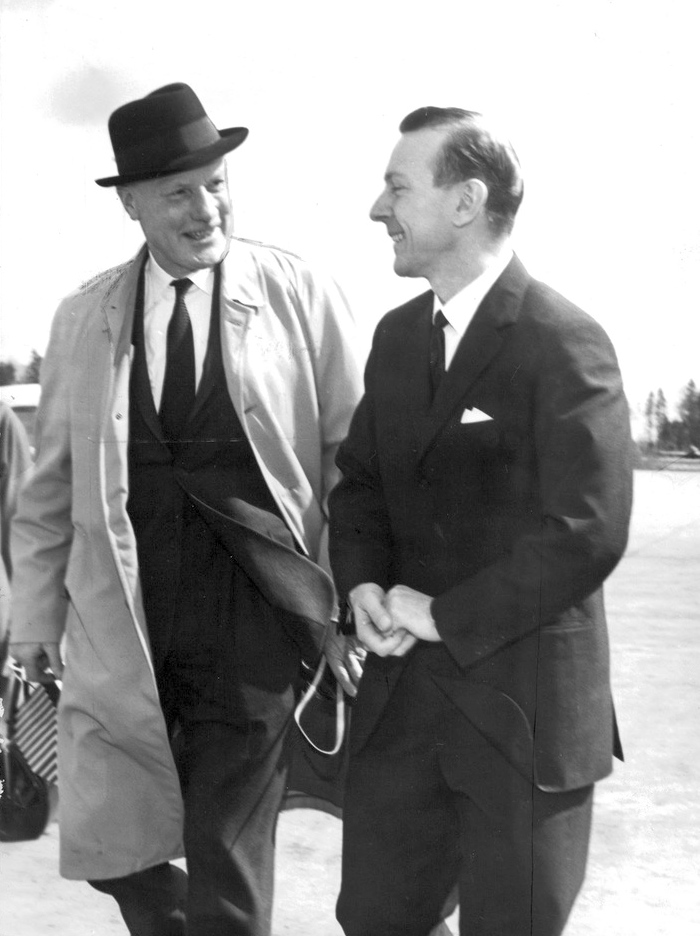
Arthur Laing (left) during a visit to Sweden in 1965.

Arthur Laing PC (9 September 1904 – 13 February 1975) was a Canadian politician from British Columbia. Though actively involved with the BC Liberals, his primary achievements were federally as a Liberal Member of Parliament. He served in the cabinets of prime ministers Lester B. Pearson and Pierre Trudeau.

== History ==
=== Early life ===
Arthur Laing was born in Eburne, BC on 9 September 1904 to Thomas (1864–1951) and Marion (1870–1949) Laing. His father, a farmer on Sea Island (namely south Eburne), belonged to the group that initiated the BC Federation of Agriculture.

Arthur graduated from the University of British Columbia (UBC) with a Bachelor of Science in Agriculture (BSA) in 1926. He joined the Vancouver Milling and Grain Company that year. He became manager of the Agriculture Chemicals Division of Buckerfields Ltd. in 1933.

=== Political career ===
Laing was a member of the Richmond School Board 1930–43, including chair for 8 years. He unsuccessfully ran as the BC Liberals candidate for Delta in 1937 and 1941. Laing was president of the BC Liberals prior to representing Vancouver South 1949–53 in the House of Commons.

He resigned his seat to become leader of the BC Liberals, immediately before the 1953 provincial election. Only three other Liberal candidates were elected to the BC legislature that year. He represented Vancouver-Point Grey 1953–56. He lost in 1956, and in the 1957 Burnaby by-election. After six years in the post, Laing stepped down as the party leader.

Returning as the member for Vancouver South 1962–72, he was Minister of Northern Affairs and National Resources (1963), Minister of Indian Affairs and Northern Development (1966), Minister of Public Works (1968), and Minister of Veterans’ Affairs (1972). He sat in the Senate 1972–75.

Many dignitaries were present among the 700 mourners who attended his funeral.

=== Marriage and children ===
In 1937, he married Geraldine Hyland (possibly Highland) (1909–1978). Linda Laurine, an only child, married David Billingsley.

=== Honours ===
He was initiated an honorary member of the Blood Band of the Blackfoot Indian Confederacy in 1967. A new government building in Yellowknife was named after him in 1969. He was awarded the Freedom of the City of Vancouver in 1974. Two geographical features, posthumously named in 1975, were the Arthur Laing Peninsula on Ellesmere Island in Canada's northernmost national park (Quttinirpaaq), and the Arthur Laing Peak on the Alaska/Yukon border. Although the name was announced in September 1974, the Arthur Laing Bridge, in Metro Vancouver, did not open to traffic until August 27, 1975 and was officially dedicated on May 15, 1976. He had been a strong advocate for this link. Accepted by daughter Linda on his behalf, he received one of the nine LFS Centenary Awards, issued in 2008, for outstanding achievements of UBC alumni.

=== Archives ===
There is an Arthur Laing fonds at Library and Archives Canada.

Parliament of Canada
Preceded by Howard Charles Green	Member of Parliament for Vancouver South	Succeeded by Elmore Philpott
Preceded by Ernest James Broome	Member of Parliament for Vancouver South	Succeeded by John Allen Fraser
