= Browne-Clayton =

Browne-Clayton may refer to:

== Surname ==
- Bob Browne-Clayton (1917-2003), Canadian politician

== Other uses ==
- Browne-Clayton Monument, Corinthian column in Leinster, Ireland
