= Buda Brown =

Canadian politician (1894–1962)

Buda Hosmer Brown

Member of the British Columbia Legislative Assembly for Vancouver-Point Grey
- In office September 19, 1956 – August 12, 1962 Serving with Thomas Audley Bate (1953–1963) and Robert Bonner (1953–1963)
- Preceded by: Arthur Laing
- Succeeded by: Pat McGeer

Personal details
- Born: Buda Hosmer Jenkins; June 10, 1894 Bellingham, Washington, United States
- Died: August 12, 1962 (aged 68) Vancouver, British Columbia, Canada
- Spouse: Donald Cameron Brown

Buda Hosmer Brown (née Jenkins; June 10, 1894 – August 12, 1962) was a political figure in British Columbia. She represented Vancouver-Point Grey in the Legislative Assembly of British Columbia from 1956 to 1962 as a Social Credit member.

She was born in Bellingham, Washington, the daughter of William D. Jenkins, and later married Donald Cameron Brown. She served eight years as a Vancouver Parks commissioner. Brown ran unsuccessfully as a Progressive Conservative candidate in the federal riding of Vancouver—Burrard in 1953 before being elected to the provincial assembly as a member of the Social Credit party. Brown served in the provincial cabinet as minister without portfolio from November 28, 1960 to her death. She died in office at the age of 68.
