= James Alexander Paton =

Canadian politician (1884–1946)

James Alexander Paton (July 25, 1884 – February 19, 1946) was a newspaper owner and political figure in British Columbia. He represented Vancouver-Point Grey in the Legislative Assembly of British Columbia from 1937 to 1946 as a Conservative.

He was born in Beamsville, Ontario and, in 1903, travelled west to Alberta, where he worked on a cattle ranch and as a night clerk in the Calgary post office. He later worked at placer mining, at railroad construction and as an employment agent. In 1906, he came to Vancouver, where he worked in a stationery store. Paton also spent some time in Prince Rupert where he worked at carpentry and surveying and helped set up the post office; he also was involved in surveying and mining in Whitehorse.

From Vancouver, he moved to Eburne, where he became involved in newspaper publishing. In 1908, he purchased the Point Grey Gazette, later the Vancouver Courier. Paton also operated a store where he sold books and stationery and other assorted goods and offered printing, publishing and bookbinding services. He sold the newspaper at the beginning of World War I and enlisted in the 72nd Battalion of the Canadian Infantry, serving in Belgium and France.

On his return to Canada in 1918, Paton re-purchased the Gazette. He was elected to the Point Grey municipal council in 1924 and served as reeve from 1925 to 1927. In 1925, Paton and others were charged with involvement in the kidnapping of Wong Foon Sing, accused by some of having murdered Janet Smith, but Paton was acquitted. In 1926, he married Cora May Fraser. Paton sold the Gazette later that year. In 1929, he became an alderman for the city of Vancouver. During World War II, Paton supported the movement of Japanese-Canadians into the province's interior; he also opposed giving them the right to vote. In 1946, he died in office at the age of 61.
