= Allan Leslie Cox =

Canadian politician (1927–1996)

MLA for Oak Bay
- In office 1968–1969

Personal details
- Born: October 4, 1927 Victoria, British Columbia, Canada
- Died: November 10, 1996 (aged 69) Victoria, British Columbia, Canada
- Party: British Columbia Liberal Party

Allan Leslie Cox (October 4, 1927 – November 10, 1996) was a Canadian politician. After winning a 1968 provincial byelection, he served in the Legislative Assembly of British Columbia until his defeat in the 1969 general election, as a Liberal member for the constituency of Oak Bay. He died in 1996 at the age of 69.
