= Pat McGeer =

Canadian physician, professor, medical researcher (1927–2022)

Patrick Lucey McGeer OC OBC FRSC

Member of the British Columbia Legislative Assembly for Vancouver-Point Grey
- In office December 17, 1962 – October 22, 1986 Serving with: Robert Bonner and; Ralph Raymond Loffmark (1962–1966); Garde Gardom (1966–1986)
- Preceded by: Buda Brown
- Succeeded by: Kim Campbell; Darlene Marzari

Leader of the British Columbia Liberal Party
- In office October 1968 – May 22, 1972
- Preceded by: Ray Perrault
- Succeeded by: David Anderson

Personal details
- Born: Patrick Lucey McGeer; June 29, 1927 Vancouver, British Columbia, Canada
- Died: August 29, 2022 (aged 95) Vancouver, British Columbia, Canada
- Party: British Columbia Social Credit Party (1975–1986); British Columbia Liberal Party (1962–1975)
- Spouse: Edith Graef McGeer
- Children: 3
- Education: University of British Columbia; Princeton University
- Occupation: Physician; professor; medical researcher

Patrick Lucey McGeer OC OBC FRSC (June 29, 1927 – August 29, 2022) was a Canadian physician, professor and medical researcher. He was regarded as a leading authority on the causes and prevention of Alzheimer's disease and was the principal author of the inflammatory hypothesis of the disease, which holds that Alzheimer's is an inflammation of the cortex.

He was also a Canadian basketball player who competed in the 1948 Summer Olympics, a politician who represented the constituency of Vancouver-Point Grey in the British Columbia legislature from 1962 to 1986, and a member of the British Columbia cabinet from 1975 to 1986.

He and his wife Edith were partners in research. In 1995, they were inducted together as Officers of the Order of Canada. In 2002 they were jointly inducted as Fellows of the Royal Society of Canada, and in 2005 they were jointly inducted into the Order of British Columbia.

McGeer died at his home in Vancouver on August 29, 2022, at the age of 95.

== Aurin Biotech ==
In August 2012, McGeer and his wife Edith founded Aurin Biotech Inc., following indications that the Aurintricarboxylic acid (ATA) complex inhibit activation of the Complement system. Since activation of the complement system is implicated in a number of diseases (see Complement system#Role in disease), these indications suggested that ATA could be an effective treatment for these diseases. Aurin was founded to explore the efficacy of using ATA and related compounds in the treatment of these diseases. The particular focus is on diseases that are caused or exacerbated by aberrant complement activation. Low molecular weight components of the aurintricarboxylic acid complex have been shown to be non-toxic and orally effective.
