= Robert Wilkinson (Canadian politician) =

Member of the Legislative Assembly of British Columbia
- In office 1934–1937
- Constituency: Vancouver-Point Grey

Personal details
- Born: February 8, 1888 Edinburgh, Scotland
- Died: January 4, 1967 (aged 78) Vancouver, British Columbia
- Party: British Columbia Liberal Party
- Spouse: Stella Bernice Rowling
- Children: 3
- Occupation: Manager

Robert Wilkinson (February 8, 1888 – January 4, 1967) was a Canadian politician. He served in the Legislative Assembly of British Columbia from 1933 to 1937 from the electoral district of Vancouver-Point Grey, a member of the Liberal party.
