= Tom Uphill =

Canadian politician

MLA for Fernie
- In office 1920–1960

Personal details
- Born: June 26, 1874 Chewton Mendip, Somerset, England
- Died: February 17, 1962 (aged 87) Fernie, British Columbia
- Party: Labour Party of Canada

Thomas Hubert Uphill (June 26, 1874 – February 17, 1962) was a socialist politician in British Columbia. He served a long time as mayor of Fernie and also represented the riding of Fernie in the British Columbia Legislative Assembly for forty years, most of them as the legislature's sole Labour Party MLA.

== Early life ==
Uphill was born in 1874 in Chewton Mendip, Somerset, England, the son of a farm labourer. After serving in the Second Boer War, he moved to Fernie, British Columbia in 1904 and became a life insurance salesman. He was a supporter of the trade union movement and served as secretary of the miners' union. In 1912 he was elected to city council and in 1915 he won his first election as mayor.

== Political career ==
In the 1916 provincial election, Uphill ran for the legislature as a Conservative and was narrowly defeated. The wave of political radicalisation that followed World War I deepened Uphill's sympathy with the trade union movement, and when he ran for the legislature in 1920 he did so as a member of the Federated Labour Party, which had absorbed older socialist parties. Uphill was elected as one of three FLP MLAs in the province.

In the legislature, Uphill was an opponent of prohibition and clashed with Premier John Oliver on the question. In 1924 he was re-elected as one of three Canadian Labour Party MLAs. The CLP fractured and, in 1928, Uphill was re-elected as the sole Independent Labour Party MLA, and thereafter represented the local Fernie and District Labour Party. The British Columbia Co-operative Commonwealth Federation contested its first election in 1933. Uphill declined to join the CCF, viewing it as too conservative. His views had evolved closer to those of the Communist Party of Canada, though he never joined that party or ran under its label.

The 1952 provincial election resulted in a hung parliament in which no party had a majority. The new British Columbia Social Credit League had won 19 seats, only one more than the CCF, led by Harold Winch. The CCF argued that they ought to be called upon to form a government as, with Uphill as a labour MLA, the left had as many seats as Social Credit and that, with much more parliamentary experience than the Socreds, they were better able to form a government. The CCF, however, had run candidates against Uphill in the 1949 and 1952 elections, and in 1949, Uphill had beat the Liberal-Conservative coalition candidate by only nine votes, the narrowness of the victory due to vote-splitting by the CCF. The Socreds had foreseen the CCF's argument and obtained Uphill's agreement that he would instead support Social Credit's bid to form the government. This allowed the Socreds to form government by one seat, with former Tory W. A. C. Bennett as premier. By the time Social Credit was defeated in a motion of no confidence the next year, Uphill had changed his mind and pledged to support a CCF government. However, Harold Winch was unable to convince Lieutenant-Governor Clarence Wallace to give his party a chance to form a government, and so the legislature was dissolved and in the ensuing election in 1953 Social Credit won a majority in the legislature.

Uphill remained the sole small-l labour MLA in the legislature until his retirement in 1960. He sometimes appeared and made speeches at events such as May Day organized by the Communists and later the Labor-Progressive Party.

Uphill remained mayor of Fernie until he lost a close election in 1946, but regained the office in 1950. He retired as mayor in 1955 for health reasons, though he remained in the provincial legislature for one more term.

When he died in 1962, twenty-two flags flew at half-mast to mourn his passing. An affordable living facility for seniors and people with disabilities, Tom Uphill Manor, was named in his honor.
