= Ralph Raymond Loffmark =

Canadian politician (1920–2012)

Ralph Loffmark

Member of the British Columbia Legislative Assembly for Vancouver South Vancouver-Point Grey (1963-1966)
- In office September 30, 1963 – August 30, 1972 Serving with Robert Bonner (1963-1966); Pat McGeer (1963-1966); Thomas Audley Bate (1966-1967); Norman Levi (1967-1969); Agnes Kripps (1969-1972)
- Preceded by: Thomas Audley Bate
- Succeeded by: Garde Gardom

Personal details
- Born: Ralph Raymond Loffmark; February 22, 1920 Chase, British Columbia
- Died: July 7, 2012 (aged 92) Burnaby, British Columbia
- Party: Social Credit
- Profession: Lawyer

Ralph Raymond Loffmark (February 22, 1920 – July 7, 2012) was a lawyer, chartered accountant, educator and political figure in British Columbia. He represented Vancouver-Point Grey from 1963 to 1966 and Vancouver South from 1966 to 1972 in the Legislative Assembly of British Columbia as a Social Credit member.

== Biography ==
He was born in Chase, British Columbia, the son of Raymond Victor Loffmark and Hazel M. Woodland, and was educated at the University of Toronto, the University of Pennsylvania and the University of British Columbia. Loffmark served in the Canadian Army during World War II. In 1961, he married Barbara Helen Grierson. He was a member of the Ontario bar and the British Columbia bar. He also was a professor at the University of British Columbia. Loffmark served in the provincial cabinet as Minister of Industrial Development, Trade and Commerce and as Minister of Health Services and Hospital Insurance. He was defeated when he ran for reelection to the provincial assembly in 1972. After leaving politics, Loffmark returned to teaching at the University of British Columbia. He openly supported the provincial New Democrats during the 1979 election and complained after his pension as a former member of the assembly was cut later that same year.
