= Garde Gardom =

Canadian politician (1924–2013)

The Honourable Garde Gardom OBC QC

26th Lieutenant-Governor of British Columbia
- In office April 21, 1995 – September 25, 2001
- Monarch: Elizabeth II
- Governors General: Roméo LeBlanc; Adrienne Clarkson
- Premier: Michael Harcourt; Glen Clark; Dan Miller; Ujjal Dosanjh; Gordon Campbell
- Preceded by: David Lam
- Succeeded by: Iona Campagnolo

Member of the British Columbia Legislative Assembly for Vancouver-Point Grey
- In office September 12, 1966 – October 22, 1986 Serving with Pat McGeer
- Preceded by: Robert Bonner; Ralph Raymond Loffmark
- Succeeded by: Kim Campbell

Personal details
- Born: Garde Basil Gardom; July 17, 1924 Banff, Alberta
- Died: June 19, 2013 (aged 88) Vancouver, British Columbia
- Party: Social Credit (1975–?); Liberal Party (1966–1975)
- Spouse(s): Theresa Helen Eileen Mackenzie m. February 11, 1956
- Education: University of British Columbia

Garde Basil Gardom, OBC QC (July 17, 1924 – June 18, 2013) was a Canadian politician, lawyer, and the 26th Lieutenant Governor of British Columbia.

== Early life ==
Gardom was born in Banff, Alberta on July 17, 1924. He grew up in the Fraser Valley of British Columbia, and attended secondary school in Vancouver. He obtained his BA and LLB degrees from the University of British Columbia. During his undergraduate years, he played varsity basketball for the Thunderbirds and was an active member of the BC Alpha chapter of the Phi Delta Theta fraternity. He then practised law in Vancouver.

== Political career ==
Gardom was elected to the Legislative Assembly of British Columbia in the constituency of Vancouver-Point Grey in the general elections of 1966, 1969, 1972, 1975, 1979, and 1983. Originally a Liberal, he joined the Social Credit party in 1975 and was appointed to the cabinet of Premier Bill Bennett in 1975. He held numerous ministerial positions including Attorney General, Minister of Intergovernmental Relations, and was the longest-serving Government House Leader.

In 1987, Gardom was appointed the agent-general for British Columbia in London, England. He served in that post until 1992.

=== Lieutenant governor ===
In 1995, Gardom was appointed Lieutenant Governor of British Columbia by Governor General Roméo LeBlanc, on the advice of Prime Minister Jean Chrétien. He was the only non-Liberal politician to be appointed as a Lieutenant Governor during Chrétien's term (although Gardom started out his career with the Liberals). He served until 2001. In 2002 he received the Order of British Columbia.

== Personal life ==
In 1956, Gardom married Helen Eileen Mackenzie. They had five children. Gardom was a very active contributor to the 4-H community.

== Death ==
Gardom died on June 18, 2013, aged 88.

== Arms ==
Coat of arms of Garde Gardom

Crest
Issuant from a coronet erablé Gules the rim encircled with a frieze of fleurs-de-lys Or an arm in armour embowed grasping a sword all Or;
Escutcheon
Or an open book Argent bound Azure charged with a representation of the Mace of the Legislative Assembly of British Columbia in bend Or between a chief dancetty of five and in base three barrulets wavy Azure;
Supporters
On a grassy mound Vert set dexter and sinister with dogwood flowers Argent seeded Or and in base with Icelandic poppies proper dexter a stag Or unguled and attired and gorged with a collar Azure pendant therefrom a hurt charged with an ansul Or sinister a mare Or unguled and maned Azure gorged with a like collar charged with a stag’s head affronty Or;
Motto
GARDEZ
