= Larry Giovando =

Canadian politician

Member of the British Columbia Legislative Assembly for Nanaimo and the Islands
- In office 1952–1956
- Preceded by: George Sharratt Pearson
- Succeeded by: Earle Cathers Westwood

Personal details
- Born: March 10, 1905 Ladysmith, British Columbia, Canada
- Died: May 25, 1982 (aged 77) near Port Townsend, Washington, US
- Party: Progressive Conservative

Larry Giovando also known formally as Lorenzo Giovando (March 10, 1905 – May 25, 1982) was twice MLA in British Columbia's Legislative Assembly for the Conservative Party of British Columbia for the seat of Nanaimo and the Islands. His 1952 and 1953 victories are examples of how the Instant runoff voting works to allow or ensure that a majority finds the candidate acceptable.

In the provincial election of 1952, on the first ballot he received only 3346 votes (31.9%) to CCF candidate Daniel Stupich's 3715 (35.4%), but since Stupich failed to receive a majority, the election was decided by "instant run-off" whereby the top two candidates received votes from the third, fourth, and fifth place Liberal, Social Credit, and Labour-Progressive candidates. When these votes were redistributed, Giovando emerged the winner 5144 (52.9%) to 4581 (47.1%).

The results of the 1953 election continued in the same vein as Giovando polled only 2,046 votes (20.8%) in the first ballot, in third place out of six candidates, but managed 4,376 (50.1%) on the fifth, against Stupich's 3,631 (37.0%) on the first and 4,358 (49.9%) on the fifth. It was the only seat the PCs would win in that election, and they would cease to be an electoral entity thereafter. He did not seek reelection in the 1956 provincial election and died in 1982.
