= Frank Snowsell =

Canadian politician (1908-2003)

MLA for Saanich
- In office 1952-1953

Personal details
- Born: May 15, 1908 Cirencester, Gloucestershire, England, United Kingdom
- Died: August 16, 2003 (aged 95) Kelowna, British Columbia, Canada
- Party: British Columbia New Democratic Party

Frank Snowsell (May 15, 1908 – August 16, 2003) was a British-born educator and political figure in British Columbia. He represented Saanich in the Legislative Assembly of British Columbia between 1952 and 1953 as a Co-operative Commonwealth Federation (CCF) member.

Born in Cirencester, Gloucestershire, England, he came to Canada with his family and completed his education at the University of British Columbia. In 1933, he married Chelta Reid. Snowsell worked with the RCAF Intelligence Division in Germany and Denmark during World War II. Snowsell was defeated when he ran for reelection in 1953, 1956 and 1972. He returned to teaching after leaving politics. In 1965, he was elected president of the provincial NDP. Snowsell ran unsuccessfully as an NDP candidate in the Capilano federal riding in 1968.

In 1985, he published Road to ruin: the path of the United States foreign policy, 1945-1984. He died in Kelowna in 2003.
