= Martin Elliott Sowden =

Member of the Legislative Assembly of British Columbia
- In office 1953
- Constituency: North Vancouver

Personal details
- Born: January 21, 1887 Simcoe, Ontario
- Died: February 10, 1962 (aged 75) North Vancouver, British Columbia
- Party: British Columbia Liberal Party
- Spouse: Beatrice Elliot

Martin Elliott "Sam" Sowden (January 21, 1887 – February 10, 1962) was a Canadian banker and politician. He was born in Ontario but moved to North Vancouver in 1927 where he worked at the Canadian Bank of Commerce at 92 Lonsdale, becoming the manager in 1929. When the District of North Vancouver was in receivership, he was appointed as the Commissioner from 1945 to 1951. He then served as the Reeve (Mayor) of the District of North Vancouver in 1951 and 1952. He served in the Legislative Assembly of British Columbia from 1952 to 1953 from the electoral district of North Vancouver, a member of the Liberal party. His first wife was Rita Winnifred Sowden who died in 1952. His second wife was Beatrice Elliott (Sowden). He and Rita had a son named Robert Elliott Sowden and a daughter named Joan Winnifred Sowden.
