= Democratic Party of Canada =

Short lived Canadian political party

- Former federal party
- Leader: William Richard Nathaniel Smith
- Founded: c. 1945
- Dissolved: c. 1945

The Democratic Party of Canada was a short-lived political party in Canada. Its leader was William Richard Nathaniel Smith.

In the July 11, 1945 federal election, five candidates unsuccessfully sought election in ridings in Vancouver, British Columbia as Democratic Party candidates. Together, they won 2,603 votes, or 1.3% of the popular votes in the ridings in which they ran.

The Democratic Party campaigned under the slogans, "Vote Democrat and build an independent nation", and "Sincere determined men of action with the plans for a nation".

His brother, George Rayburn Johnson Smith, who played 2nd base for the 1926 British Columbia Champion Abbotsford Semi-Professional Baseball team garnered the most votes for this short-lived political party.

"Mr. Smith believes, as Abraham Lincoln did, that Canada must become an INDEPENDENT NATION. He believes our future belongs in the same direction as the United States. Because of the past policies of other parties, Canada has been kept small. That was well proved at the San Francisco Conference. Canada, after all our work remained without a vote."

William Smith also ran as a Democratic Party of Canada candidate in the October 25, 1945 British Columbia provincial election in Vancouver-Point Grey riding, winning 423 votes, or 0.43% of the total.

1945 Federal election results
Name of candidate	Riding	# of votes	% of popular vote
Broatch, Spencer Herbert	New Westminster	315	0.7%
Parkin, Dave Bernard	Vancouver—Burrard	246	0.6%
Smith, George Rayburn	Vancouver South	920	1.9%
Smith, William Richard Nathaniel	Vancouver Centre	393	1.2%
Wallace, William Nicholas	Vancouver East	729	2.0%

== See also ==
- List of political parties in Canada

== Sources ==
- Parliament of Canada History of the Federal Electoral Ridings since 1867
- Vancouver Sun, October 1945.
