= George Moir Weir =

Canadian politician

George Moir Weir (May 10, 1885 – December 4, 1949) was an educator and political figure in British Columbia. After years as Head of the Department of Education at the University of British Columbia, Weir became the provincial Minister of Education and oversaw numerous reforms to the school system. He represented Vancouver-Point Grey from 1933 to 1941 and Vancouver-Burrard from 1945 to 1949 in the Legislative Assembly of British Columbia as a Liberal.

He was born in Miami, Manitoba, the son of the Reverend Richard Weir and Margaret Moir, and was educated at McGill University and the University of Chicago. Weir was a professor of Education at the University of British Columbia. He served in the provincial cabinet as Minister of Education (1933 to 1941 and again from 1945 to 1947) and as Provincial Secretary (1933 to 1941). Weir introduced health insurance legislation in British Columbia in 1935 and 1936. He was defeated when he ran for re-election in 1941.

Weir wrote The responsible government decade in Canada (1914), Survey of nursing education in Canada (1932), The separate school question in Canada (1934) and Our faith in liberalism (1947).
