= Richard Orr Newton =

Canadian politician

Richard Orr Newton (May 14, 1905 – February 14, 1963) was an educator, general store and restaurant owner, and political figure in British Columbia. He represented Columbia in the Legislative Assembly of British Columbia in 1952 and then from 1953 to 1963 as a Social Credit member.

He was born in Hornings Mills, Ontario in 1905, the son of Richard E. Newton and Elizabeth A. Orr. In 1940, Newton married Laura Ruth Weir. He resigned his seat in 1952 to allow Robert Bonner to be elected to the assembly. In 1963, Newton died in office at home in Invermere at the age of 57.
