= Albert Reginald MacDougall =

Canadian politician (1902–1953)

Member of the Legislative Assembly of British Columbia
- In office June 24, 1946 – January 20, 1953
- Constituency: Vancouver-Point Grey

Personal details
- Born: October 17, 1902 Moncton, New Brunswick
- Died: January 20, 1953 (aged 50) Vancouver, British Columbia
- Party: British Columbia Progressive Conservative Party
- Spouse: Ruth Everett
- Education: Mount Allison University, Merton College, Oxford

Albert Reginald MacDougall (October 17, 1902 – January 20, 1953) was a Canadian politician. He served in the Legislative Assembly of British Columbia from a 1946 byelection to 1953 from the electoral district of Vancouver-Point Grey, a member of the Progressive Conservatives. He was an alumnus of Mount Allison University and Merton College, Oxford, where he matriculated in 1923 as a Rhodes Scholar. He died in office from cancer in 1953.

He was the son of William McDougall and Josephine Trites McDougall.
