= William Kenneth Kiernan =

Canadian businessman and politician

Member of the British Columbia Legislative Assembly for Chilliwack
- In office June 12, 1952 – August 30, 1972
- Preceded by: Leslie Harvey Eyres
- Succeeded by: Harvey Schroeder

Personal details
- Born: July 25, 1916 Peace River, Alberta, Canada
- Died: August 26, 1997 (aged 81) Delta, British Columbia, Canada
- Party: Social Credit

William Kenneth Kiernan (July 25, 1916 – August 26, 1997) was a Canadian businessman and political figure in British Columbia. He represented Chilliwack in the Legislative Assembly of British Columbia from 1952 to 1972 as a Social Credit member.

He was born in Peace River, Alberta, the son of Herbert Wallace Kiernan and Violet Grace Griffith, and was educated there and in Victoria, British Columbia. Kiernan was married to Mary Juanita Evans in 1938. He served in the provincial cabinet as Minister of Agriculture, Minister of Mines (and then Minister of Mines and Petroleum Resources), Minister of Recreation and Conservation, Minister of Travel Industry and Minister of Commercial Transport. He died in Delta, British Columbia in August 1997 at the age of 81.
