= Thomas Audley Bate =

Canadian politician (1913–1967)

MLA for Vancouver-Point Grey
- In office 1953–1963

MLA for Vancouver South
- In office 1966–1967

Personal details
- Born: March 12, 1913 Cumberland, British Columbia
- Died: September 21, 1967 (aged 54) Vancouver, British Columbia
- Party: Social Credit Party of British Columbia

Thomas Audley Bate (March 12, 1913 – September 21, 1967) was a Canadian politician. He served in the Legislative Assembly of British Columbia from 1953 to 1963 and 1966 to 1967, as a Social Credit member for the constituencies of Vancouver–Point Grey and Vancouver South. He died of a heart attack in 1967.
