= British Columbia New Democratic Party leadership elections =

This page covers the results of leadership elections in the British Columbia New Democratic Party (known as the Co-operative Commonwealth Federation before 1961).

== Early developments ==
On July 5, 1936, CCF parliamentary leader Robert Connell survived a leadership challenge, 138 votes to 76. It was also determined, at this meeting, that the party's future leadership would be decided by delegated conventions.

== 1939 leadership convention ==
(Held June 26, 1939)

- Harold Winch elected 56-11

== 1953 leadership convention ==
(Held April 10, 1953)

- Arnold Alexander Webster acclaimed

== 1956 leadership convention ==
(Held April 6, 1956)

- Robert Strachan 72
- Leo Thomas Nimsick 35
- Arthur James Turner 19

== 1961 Leadership convention ==
(Held October 28, 1961)

- Robert Strachan acclaimed

== 1967 leadership challenge ==
(Held on June 4, 1967, in Burnaby, British Columbia.)

- Robert Strachan 278
- Thomas R. Berger 177

== 1969 leadership convention ==
(Held on April 12, 1969.)

First ballot:

- Thomas R. Berger 364
- Dave Barrett 249
- Bob Williams 130
- John Conway 44

Second ballot:

- Thomas R. Berger 411
- Dave Barrett 375

Berger stepped down as party leader after the NDP lost the provincial election of 1969. Barrett was subsequently chosen as interim party leader.

== 1970 leadership convention ==
(Held June 6, 1970)

- Dave Barrett acclaimed

== 1984 leadership convention ==
(Held on May 20, 1984.)

First ballot:

- David Vickers 269
- William Stewart King 240
- Robert Skelly 171
- Margaret Birrell 141
- David Stupich 132
- Graham Lea 101

Lea was eliminated, and endorsed Stupich.

Second ballot:

- David Vickers 308
- William Stewart King 263
- Robert Skelly 218
- David Stupich 147
- Margaret Birrell 134

Birrell was eliminated. She initially declined to endorse another candidate, but later supported Robert Skelly.

Third ballot:

- David Vickers 339
- Robert Skelly 313
- William Stewart King 292
- David Stupich 114

Stupich was eliminated. He declined to endorse another candidate.

Fourth ballot:

- David Vickers 383
- Robert Skelly 349
- William Stewart King 333

King was eliminated, and endorsed Skelly.

Fifth ballot:

- Robert Skelly 606
- David Vickers 452

== 1987 leadership convention ==
(Held on April 12, 1987.)

- Michael Harcourt acclaimed

== 1996 leadership convention ==
(Held on February 18, 1996.)

- Glen Clark 802
- Corky Evans 234
- Joan Smallwood 67
- Donovan Kuehn 23
- Jack McDonald 6

== 2000 leadership convention ==
(Held on February 20, 2000.)

- Ujjal Dosanjh 769
- Corky Evans 549

(Gordon Wilson had been a candidate but withdrew an hour before voting began and endorsed Corky Evans. Labour activist Len Werden had withdrawn the day before the convention. Joy MacPhail had also been a candidate but she dropped out on January 8, 2000 and threw her support to Ujjal Dosanjh. MacPhail became interim leader after Dosanjh lost his seat in the 2001 provincial election and resigned. On June 4, 2003 she announced her intention to resign as interim leader.)

== 2003 leadership convention ==
(Held on November 23, 2003.)

First ballot:

- Carole James 325
- Nils Jensen 169
- Leonard Krog 150
- Steve Orcherton 87
- Mehdi Najari 32
- Peter Dimitrov 12

Second ballot:

- Carole James 395
- Leonard Krog 219
- Nils Jensen 162

== 2011 leadership convention ==
(Held on April 17, 2011.)

Candidate	First ballot		Second ballot		Third ballot	
Candidate	Votes	Percent	Votes	Percent	Votes	Percent
Adrian Dix	7,638	38.2%	7,748	39.3%	9,772	51.8%
Mike Farnworth	6,979	34.9%	6,951	35.2%	9,095	48.2%
John Horgan	4,844	24.2%	5,034	25.5%		
Dana Larsen	531	2.7%				

== 2014 leadership convention ==
(Originally to be held September 28, 2014.)

John Horgan acclaimed leader on May 1, 2014, when the nomination deadline passes with no other candidate registering. He officially took over as party leader May 4, 2014.

== 2022 leadership convention ==
(Originally to be held on December 3, 2022)

David Eby was acclaimed leader on October 21, 2022, after the only other candidate in the race was disqualified.

== See also ==
- List of British Columbia general elections
- Leader of the Opposition (British Columbia)
