= 29th Parliament of British Columbia =

The 29th Legislative Assembly of British Columbia sat from 1970 to 1972. The members were elected in the British Columbia general election held in August 1969. The Social Credit Party led by W. A. C. Bennett formed the government. The New Democratic Party (NDP) led by Dave Barrett formed the official opposition.

William Harvey Murray served as speaker for the assembly.

== Members of the 29th Parliament ==
The following members were elected to the assembly in 1969:

Member	Electoral district	Party	First elected / previously elected	No.# of term(s)
Howard Richmond McDiarmid	Alberni	Social Credit	1966	2nd term
Frank Arthur Calder	Atlin	NDP	1949, 1960	7th term*
Francis Xavier Richter	Boundary-Similkameen	Social Credit	1953	6th term
Gordon Dowding	Burnaby-Edmonds	NDP	1956	5th term
Eileen Dailly	Burnaby North	NDP	1966	2nd term
James Gibson Lorimer	Burnaby-Willingdon	NDP	1969	2nd term
Alexander Vaughan Fraser	Cariboo	Social Credit	1969	1st term
William Kenneth Kiernan	Chilliwack	Social Credit	1952	7th term
James Roland Chabot	Columbia River	Social Credit	1963	3rd term
Daniel Robert John Campbell	Comox	Social Credit	1956	5th term
David Barrett	Coquitlam	NDP	1960	4th term
Robert Martin Strachan	Cowichan-Malahat	NDP	1952	7th term
Robert Wenman	Delta	Social Credit	1966	2nd term
George Mussallem	Dewdney	Social Credit	1966	2nd term
Herbert Joseph Bruch	Esquimalt	Social Credit	1953	6th term
Ray Gillis Williston	Fort George	Social Credit	1953	6th term
Philip Arthur Gaglardi	Kamloops	Social Credit	1952	7th term
Leo Thomas Nimsick	Kootenay	NDP	1949	8th term
Hunter Bertram Vogel	Langley	Social Credit	1963	3rd term
Isabel Dawson	Mackenzie	Social Credit	1966	2nd term
Frank James Ney	Nanaimo	Social Credit	1969	1st term
Wesley Drewett Black	Nelson-Creston	Social Credit	1952	7th term
Dennis Geoffrey Cocke	New Westminster	NDP	1969	1st term
Patricia Jordan	North Okanagan	Social Credit	1966	2nd term
Dean Edward Smith	North Peace River	Social Credit	1966	2nd term
David Maurice Brousson	North Vancouver-Capilano	Liberal	1968	2nd term
Barrie Aird Clark	North Vancouver-Seymour	Liberal	1966	2nd term
George Scott Wallace	Oak Bay	Social Credit	1969	1st term
George Scott Wallace	Oak Bay	Independent	1969	1st term
George Scott Wallace	Oak Bay	Progressive Conservative	1969	1st term
Cyril Morley Shelford	Omineca	Social Credit	1952	7th term
William Harvey Murray	Prince Rupert	Social Credit	1956	5th term
Burton Peter Campbell	Revelstoke-Slocan	Social Credit	1969	1st term
Ernest A. LeCours	Richmond	Social Credit	1963	3rd term
Donald Leslie Brothers	Rossland-Trail	Social Credit	1958	5th term
John Douglas Tidball Tisdalle	Saanich and the Islands	Social Credit	1953	6th term
Willis Franklin Jefcoat	Shuswap	Social Credit	1960	4th term
Dudley George Little	Skeena	Social Credit	1960	4th term
William Andrew Cecil Bennett	South Okanagan	Social Credit	1941, (Note: First elected as a Conservative) 1949	10th term*
Donald Albert Marshall	South Peace River	Social Credit	1969	1st term
Donald Albert Marshall	South Peace River	Progressive Conservative	1969	1st term
Ernest Hall	Surrey	NDP	1966	2nd term
Harold James Merilees	Vancouver-Burrard	Social Credit	1969	1st term
Bert Price	Vancouver-Burrard	Social Credit	1952, 1969	6th term*
Harold Peter (Herb) Capozzi	Vancouver Centre	Social Credit	1966	2nd term
Evan Maurice Wolfe	Vancouver Centre	Social Credit	1966	2nd term
Alexander Barrett MacDonald	Vancouver East	NDP	1960	4th term
Robert Arthur Williams	Vancouver East	NDP	1966	2nd term
Grace Mary McCarthy	Vancouver-Little Mountain	Social Credit	1966	2nd term
Leslie Raymond Peterson	Vancouver-Little Mountain	Social Credit	1956	6th term
Garde Basil Gardom	Vancouver-Point Grey	Liberal	1966	2nd term
Patrick Lucey McGeer	Vancouver-Point Grey	Liberal	1962	4th term
Agnes Kripps	Vancouver South	Social Credit	1969	1st term
Ralph Raymond Loffmark	Vancouver South	Social Credit	1963	3rd term
William Neelands Chant	Victoria	Social Credit	1953	6th term
Waldo McTavish Skillings	Victoria	Social Credit	1960	4th term
Louis Allan Williams	West Vancouver-Howe Sound	Liberal	1966	2nd term
William Leonard Hartley	Yale-Lillooet	NDP	1963	3rd term

== Party standings ==
Affiliation	Members
Social Credit	38
New Democratic	12
Liberal	5
Total	55
Government Majority	21

== By-elections ==
None.

== Other changes ==
- George Scott Wallace becomes an Independent on August 17, 1971. He joins the Progressive Conservatives in January 1972.
- Donald Albert Marshall joins the Progressive Conservatives on March 22, 1972.
