= Arthur Turner =

Arthur Turner may refer to:

- Arthur L. Turner (born 1950), American politician in Illinois
- Arthur Turner (British Army officer) (1878–1952), English cricketer, rugby union player and soldier
- Arthur Turner (bishop) (1862–1910), Anglican bishop in Korea
- Arthur F. Turner, president of the Optical Society of America
- Arthur Francis Turner (1912–1991), British naval officer
- Arthur James Turner (1889–1971), British scientist in the field of textile technology
- Arthur James Turner (politician) (1888–1983), politician in British Columbia, Canada
- Arthur William Turner (1900–1989), Australian veterinary scientist and bacteriologist
- Arthur Logan Turner (1865–1939), Scottish surgeon and medical author and historian
- Arthur Turner (judge) (c. 1635–1684), English-born Irish judge

== Sportspeople ==
- Archie Turner (footballer) (Arthur Turner, 1877–1925), Southampton and England footballer
- Arthur Turner (Australian footballer) (1920–2005), Australian rules footballer for South Melbourne
- Arthur Turner (footballer, born 1867) (1867–?), Small Heath forward
- Arthur Turner (footballer, born 1909) (1909–1994), Stoke and Birmingham footballer, Birmingham City and Oxford United manager
- Arthur Turner (footballer, born 1921) (1921–2019), Charlton Athletic and Colchester United centre forward
- Arthur Turner (Tottenham Hotspur football manager) (died 1949), Tottenham Hotspur club secretary and manager
- Arthur Turner (Norwich City football manager), former manager of English football club Norwich City
