= Vancouver East (provincial electoral district) =

Defunct provincial electoral district in British Columbia, Canada

Vancouver East was a provincial electoral district for the Legislative Assembly of British Columbia, Canada. It first appeared on the hustings in the general election of 1933. It and the other new Vancouver ridings in this year, Vancouver-Burrard, Vancouver-Point Grey and Vancouver Centre, were all created from the old Vancouver City riding, which was a six-member seat. Vancouver East was a two-member seat.

== Demographics ==
Population, 2001	55,510
Population Change, 1931–2001	8.2%
Area (km^{2})	23.77
Pop. Density	2,335

== Members of the Legislative Assembly ==
Assembly	Years	Seat 1		Seat 2	
Assembly	Years	Member	Party	Member	Party
18th	1933–1935	John Price	CCF	Harold Edward Winch	CCF
19th	1937–1941	James Lyle Telford	CCF	Harold Edward Winch	CCF
20th	1941–1945	Arthur James Turner	CCF	Harold Edward Winch	CCF
21st	1945–1949	Arthur James Turner	CCF	Harold Edward Winch	CCF
22nd	1949–1952	Arthur James Turner	CCF	Harold Edward Winch	CCF
23rd	1952–1953	Arthur James Turner	CCF	Harold Edward Winch	CCF
24th	1953–1956	Arthur James Turner	CCF	Arnold Alexander Webster	CCF
25th	1956–1960	Arthur James Turner	CCF	Frederick Morton Sharp	Social Credit
26th	1960–1961	Arthur James Turner	CCF	Alexander Barrett MacDonald	CCF
26th	1961–1963	Arthur James Turner	NDP	Alexander Barrett MacDonald	NDP
27th	1963–1966	Arthur James Turner	NDP	Alexander Barrett MacDonald	NDP
28th	1966–1969	Robert Arthur Williams	NDP	Alexander Barrett MacDonald	NDP
29th	1969–1972	Robert Arthur Williams	NDP	Alexander Barrett MacDonald	NDP
30th	1972–1975	Robert Arthur Williams	NDP	Alexander Barrett MacDonald	NDP
31st	1975–1976	Robert Arthur Williams	NDP	Alexander Barrett MacDonald	NDP
31st	1976–1979	Dave Barrett	NDP	Alexander Barrett MacDonald	NDP
32nd	1979–1983	Dave Barrett	NDP	Alexander Barrett MacDonald	NDP
33rd	1983–1984	Dave Barrett	NDP	Alexander Barrett MacDonald	NDP
33rd	1984–1986	Robert Arthur Williams	NDP	Alexander Barrett MacDonald	NDP
34th	1986–1991	Robert Arthur Williams	NDP	Glen Clark	NDP
Riding dissolved into Vancouver-Fraserview, Vancouver-Hastings, Vancouver-Kingsway and Vancouver-Mount Pleasant

== Electoral history ==
Note: Winners of each election are in bold.

1933 British Columbia general election
Party	Candidate	Votes	%	Elected
Co-operative Commonwealth	Harold Edward Winch^{2}	11,019	26.82	✓
Co-operative Commonwealth	John Price	10,972	26.70	✓
Liberal	Manfred McGeer	7,348	17.88	
Liberal	James Gray Turgeon	6,823	16.60	
Non-Partisan Independent Group	Alexander Daniel MacLean	1,237	3.01	
Non-Partisan Independent Group	Norah Leavy	1,213	2.95	
United Front (Workers and Farmers)	Ethel Jane Evans	501	1.22	
United Front (Workers and Farmers)	Robert Henry Lealess	501	1.22	
Independent	Gordon Monroe Grant	418	1.027	
Unionist	Gabriel Eustis^{1}	404	0.98	
Independent Co-operative Commonwealth	Fenwick Wilbur Crawford	309	0.75	
Independent Co-operative Commonwealth	John Grant Leggatt	249	0.61	
Socialist	John Henry Burrough	98	0.24	
Total valid votes		28,323	100.00	
Total rejected ballots		138		
^{1} Referred to as "Labour" in the newspapers but identified as UPBC in Statement of Votes and List of Candidates.^{2} Leader of the Opposition, 1941-1953.

1937 British Columbia general election
Party	Candidate	Votes	%	Elected
Co-operative Commonwealth	**James Lyle Telford**	11,752	54.11	✓
Co-operative Commonwealth	**Harold Edward Winch**	11,350	52.26	✓
Liberal	Charles Albert Donovan	5,251	24.18	
Liberal	Margaret Russell Barclay	5,063	23.31	
Conservative	William Corran	3,079	14.18	
Conservative	Thomas Irvine	2,835	13.05	
Social Constructive	John Price	682	3.14	
Social Constructive	William Arthur Pritchard	464	2.14	
Social Credit League	Claude Weamar Powell	208	0.96	
Social Credit League	Gordon Victor Towle	181	0.83	
Socialist	John Henry Burrough	53	0.24	
Total valid votes		21,717	100.00	
Total rejected ballots		362		

1941 British Columbia general election
Party	Candidate	Votes	%	Elected
Co-operative Commonwealth	Harold Edward Winch	13,571	30.78	✓
Co-operative Commonwealth	Arthur James Turner	9,757	22.12	✓
Liberal	John Henderson	4,938	11.20	
Liberal	Theodore Roosvelt Burnett	4,557	10.34	
Conservative	William Wilfred Derpak	3,770	8.55	
Independent Labour	James Lyle Telford	3,665	8.31	
Conservative	George Wilkinson Hubbard	3,562	8.08	
Socialist Labor	Robert Gordon McQuillan	271	0.61	
Total valid votes		44,091	100.00	
Total rejected ballots		420		
^{2} Became Leader of the Opposition.

1945 British Columbia general election
Party	Candidate	Votes	%	Elected
Co-operative Commonwealth	Harold Edward Winch	13,421	27.81	✓
Co-operative Commonwealth	Arthur James Turner	12,300	25.49	✓
Coalition	Frederick John Hume	9,816	20.34	
Coalition	Henry Edwards	9,164	18.99	
Labour Progressive	Harold James Pritchett	1,541	3.19	
Labour Progressive	Charles MacGregor Stewart	1,257	2.60	
Social Credit Alliance	Arthur C. Rowe	372	0.77	
Social Credit Alliance	Gordon Victor Towle	333	0.69	
Socialist Labor	Raymond Harold MacLeod	56	0.12	
Total valid votes		48,260		
Total rejected ballots		154		

1949 British Columbia general election
Party	Candidate	Votes	%	Elected
Co-operative Commonwealth	**Harold Edward Winch**	20,531	51.41	✓
Co-operative Commonwealth	**Arthur James Turner**	19,284	48.29	✓
Coalition	John Dickinson Cornett	17,168	42.99	
Coalition	Douglas Brown	16,909	42.34	
Labor-Progressive	Viola Ma Bianco	1,038	2.60	
Social Credit	Thomas McGibbon	625	1.57	
Social Credit	Audrey Anne Neale	395	0.99	
Union of Electors	Sidney Lamont Gray	109	0.27	
Total valid votes		39,933	100.00	
Total rejected ballots		523		

For the elimination-ballot elections of 1952 and 1953 the riding's voters were presented with two ballots, one for each seat, with two separate candidate-races:

1952 British Columbia general election, ballot A
Party	Candidate	Votes 1st count	%	Votes final count	%
Co-operative Commonwealth	**Arthur James Turner**	21,006	47.45	**21,960**	**51.48**
Social Credit League	Ira Nathan Molson	11,536	26.06	12,433	29.15
Liberal	Everett Crowley	13,406	14.85	8,263	19.37
Progressive Conservative	Emma Loring Tinsman	2,850	6.44		
Christian Democratic	Albert Peter Busch	1,387	3.13		
Labour Progressive	Stephen Endicott	917	2.07		
Total valid votes		44,270	100.00	42,656	100.00
Total rejected ballots		2,701			
Note: Preferential ballot; first and final of four (4) counts only shown.

1952 British Columbia general election, ballot B
Party	Candidate	Votes 1st count	%	Votes final count	%
Co-operative Commonwealth	**Harold Edward Winch**	23,051	51.42	**23,051**	**51.42**
Social Credit League	John Duncan Roberts	11,202	24.99	11,202	24.99
Liberal	Frank George Perrin Lewis	5,286	11.79	5,286	11.79
Progressive Conservative	Irving Simpson Finkleman	3,045	6.79	3,045	6.79
Christian Democratic	Lomer Arthur Louis Dion	1,318	2.94	1,318	2.94
Labour Progressive	Maurice Rush	931	2.08	931	2.08
Total valid votes		44,833	100.00	44,833	100.00
Total rejected ballots		2,338			
Note: Preferential ballot; only one (1) count was required.

1953 British Columbia general election, ballot A
Party	Candidate	Votes 1st count	%	Votes final count	%
Co-operative Commonwealth	**Arthur James Turner**	19,475	48.32	**19,942**	**50.35**
Social Credit	Anthony Maximilian Arnold	13,225	32.81	13,872	35.02
Liberal	Everett Crowley	5,272	13.08	5,796	14.63
Labour Progressive	Nigel Morgan	842	2.09		
Progressive Conservative	Irving Simpson Finkleman	747	1.86		
Christian Democratic	Albert Peter Busch	743	1.84		
Total valid votes		40,304	100.00	39,610	100.00
Total rejected ballots		2,592			
Note: Preferential ballot; first and final of four (4) counts only shown.

1953 British Columbia general election, ballot B
Party	Candidate	Votes 1st count	%	Votes final count	%
Co-operative Commonwealth	**Arnold Alexander Webster**	20,583	51.22	**20,583**	**51.22**
Social Credit	Stanley Earl Wilcox	12,910	32.12	12,910	32.12
Liberal	Phillip James Lipp	4,727	11.76	4,727	11.76
Labour Progressive	Harvey Murphy	816	2.03	8.16	2.03
Progressive Conservative	Irving Simpson Finkleman	803	2.00	803	2.00
Christian Democratic	Albert Peter Busch	351	0.87	351	0.87
Total valid votes		40,190	100.00	40,190	100.00
Total rejected ballots		2,681			
Note: Preferential ballot; only one count required on this ballot.

1956 British Columbia general election
Party	Candidate	Votes	%	Elected
Co-operative Commonwealth	**Arthur James Turner**	19,774	44.14	✓
Social Credit	**Frederick Morton Sharp**	18,640	41.61	✓
Co-operative Commonwealth	Harold Edward Thayer	18,541	41.39	
Social Credit	Evelyn Margaret Fingarson	17,821	39.78	
Liberal	Patrick Joseph O'Donohue	4,229	9.44	
Liberal	John Leslie McCabe	4,156	9.28	
Progressive Conservative	Lorne C. Aggett	720	1.61	
Progressive Conservative	Sidney Lewis Beyer	541	1.21	
Total valid votes		44,795	100.00	
Total rejected ballots		76		

1960 British Columbia general election
Party	Candidate	Votes	%	Elected
Co-operative Commonwealth	**Alexander Barrett MacDonald**	25,610	49.46	✓
Co-operative Commonwealth	**Arthur James Turner**	25,580	49.40	✓
Social Credit	Frederick Morton Sharp	16,622	32.10	
Social Credit	Raymond McCarthy	16,379	31.63	
Liberal	Harold (Harry) Appleton	5,906	11.41	
Liberal	Joseph Charles Bryant	5,828	11.26	
Progressive Conservative	Norman Gareth Dent	1,080	2.09	
Progressive Conservative	Madeline Barbara Dent	999	1.93	
Communist	Nigel Morgan	718	1.39	
Communist	John Phillips	598	1.15	
Total valid votes		51,781	100.00	
Total rejected ballots		761		

1963 British Columbia general election
Party	Candidate	Votes	%	Elected
New Democratic	**Alexander Barrett MacDonald**	20,424	44.99	✓
New Democratic	**Arthur James Turner**	20,292	44.70	✓
Social Credit	James Morris Kennedy	17,031	37.51	
Social Credit	Earl Vance	16,867	37.15	
Liberal	John Joseph Fedyk	3,996	8.80	
Liberal	Lloyd Bruce Little	3,901	8.59	
Progressive Conservative	Gladys Chong	2,308	5.08	
Progressive Conservative	William Dronsfield	2,260	4.98	
Independent	Albert Dunn	215	0.47	
Total valid votes		45,401	100.00	
Total rejected ballots		644		

1966 British Columbia general election
Party	Candidate	Votes	%	Elected
New Democratic	**Alexander Barrett MacDonald**	12,502	49.03	✓
New Democratic	**Robert Arthur Williams**	12,185	47.78	✓
Social Credit	James Morris Kennedy	8,644	33.90	
Social Credit	Allan Edward Morgan	8,593	33.70	
Liberal	John Joseph Fedyk	1,637	6.42	
Liberal	Harry Pederini	1,583	6.21	
Communist	Homer Stevens	377	1.48	
Total valid votes		25,501	100.00	
Total rejected ballots		404		

1969 British Columbia general election
Party	Candidate	Votes	%	Elected
New Democratic	**Alexander Barrett MacDonald**	13,006	49.14	✓
New Democratic	**Robert Arthur Williams**	12,768	48.24	✓
Social Credit	Arthur Berg Jacobson	9,997	37.77	
Social Credit	Max Edward Meyer	9,905	37.42	
Liberal	Mary Gertrude Gibson	2,398	9.06	
Liberal	James Morrison	2,320	8.77	
Communist	Nigel Morgan	203	0.77	
Communist	Ernest Francis Crist	159	0.60	
Independent	Lionel Vincent Hodgson	54	0.20	
Total valid votes		26,467	100.00	
Total rejected ballots		338		

1972 British Columbia general election
Party	Candidate	Votes	%	Elected
New Democratic	**Alexander Barrett MacDonald**	16,946	62.19	✓
New Democratic	**Robert Arthur Williams**	16,647	61.09	✓
Social Credit	A.G. David Brown	7,473	27.42	
Social Credit	Biren K. Jha	7,117	26.11	
Progressive Conservative	Donald McIntyre	2,453	9.00	
Progressive Conservative	Paul John Mitchell	2,299	8.44	
Communist	Nigel Morgan	250	0.92	
Communist	Barry F. Dean	237	0.87	
Total valid votes		27,250	100.00	
Total rejected ballots		515		

1975 British Columbia general election
Party	Candidate	Votes	%	Elected
New Democratic	**Alexander Barrett MacDonald**	15,918	52.73	✓
New Democratic	**Robert Arthur Williams**	15,396	51.01	✓
Social Credit	Ratomir (Roy) Babic	10,431	34.56	
Social Credit	Nick Mandrusiak	10,267	34.01	
Liberal	Norman Chamberlist	1,591	5.27	
Liberal	Florence Anne Simatos	1,387	4.59	
Communist	Nigel Morgan	214	0.71	
Communist	Samuel G. Vint	144	0.48	
North American Labour	Calvin Alphonso Segur	42	0.14	
Revolutionary Marxist Group	Stephen Richard Penner	41	0.14	
Revolutionary Marxist Group	Gary Eric Cristall	31	0.10	
Total valid votes		30,185	100.00	
Total rejected ballots		582		

British Columbia provincial by-election, June 3, 1976 Resignation of Robert Arthur Williams
Party	Candidate	Votes	%
New Democratic	**Dave Barrett**	19,997	70.23
Social Credit	Ralph Harry Long	7,023	24.66
Liberal	James Bruce Siemens	1,041	3.66
Progressive Conservative	Lester Harold Lavers	218	0.77
Independent	David John Bader	104	0.36
Independent	Anne Boylan	58	0.20
North American Labour	Alan Levinson	34	0.12
Total valid votes		28,475	100.00
Total rejected ballots		348	
Turnout		28,823	

1979 British Columbia general election
Party	Candidate	Votes	%	Elected
New Democratic	**Dave Barrett**	21,836	62.44	✓
New Democratic	**Alexander Barrett MacDonald**	20,670	59.11	✓
Social Credit	Helen Demetra Boyce	10,857	31.05	
Social Credit	Bernard Merle Smith	10,688	30.56	
Progressive Conservative	William Arthur Honour	1,068	3.05	
Progressive Conservative	Shirley Joann Keinanen	999	2.86	
North American Labour	Andre Doucet	152	0.43	
Total valid votes		34,970	100.00	
Total rejected ballots		1,032		

1983 British Columbia general election
Party	Candidate	Votes	%	Elected
New Democratic	**Dave Barrett**	22,117	58.52	✓
New Democratic	**Alexander Barrett MacDonald**	21,112	55.86	✓
Social Credit	William James McMartin	12,025	31.82	
Social Credit	Gordon Ralph Smith	11,741	31.06	
Liberal	Bruce W. Robinson	1,188	3.14	
Liberal	Angela E. Thiele	1,087	2.88	
Communist	Bert Ogden	316	0.84	
Total valid votes		37,796	100.00	
Total rejected ballots		1,046		

British Columbia provincial by-election, November 8, 1984 Resignation of Dave Barrett
Party	Candidate	Votes	%
New Democratic	**Bob Williams**	12,857	55.50
Liberal	Arthur John "Art" Lee	6,287	27.14
Social Credit	Mario Caravetta	3,743	16.16
Green	Hans-Joachim Grages	200	0.86
Independent	David John Ford	79	0.34
Total valid votes		23,166	100.00
Total rejected ballots		364	
Turnout		23,530	

1986 British Columbia general election
Party	Candidate	Votes	%	Elected
New Democratic	**Robert Arthur Williams**	21,555	58.59	✓
New Democratic	**Glen Clark**	20,951	56.95	✓
Social Credit	John M. Bitonti	11,069	30.09	
Social Credit	Peter Guy Westlake	10,907	29.65	
Liberal	Val Anderson	3,348	9.10	
Liberal	Anita M. Morris	2,804	7.62	
Communist	Maurice Rush	316	0.86	
People's Front	Joseph Theriault	94	0.26	
Total valid votes		36,787	100.00	
Total rejected ballots		1,718		

A redistribution before the 1991 election dramatically changed Vancouver's long-standing electoral map by the abandonment of the century-old tradition of multiple member districts. Vancouver East was abolished. Its principal successor ridings were Vancouver-Kensington, Vancouver-Hastings, and Vancouver-Kingsway. Portions of Vancouver-Mount Pleasant and Vancouver-Burrard, formerly part of Vancouver Centre may also have been added.

== See also ==
- List of British Columbia provincial electoral districts
- Canadian provincial electoral districts
- Vancouver (electoral districts)
