= Alexander Macdonald (British Columbia politician) =

Canadian lawyer and politician (1918-2014)

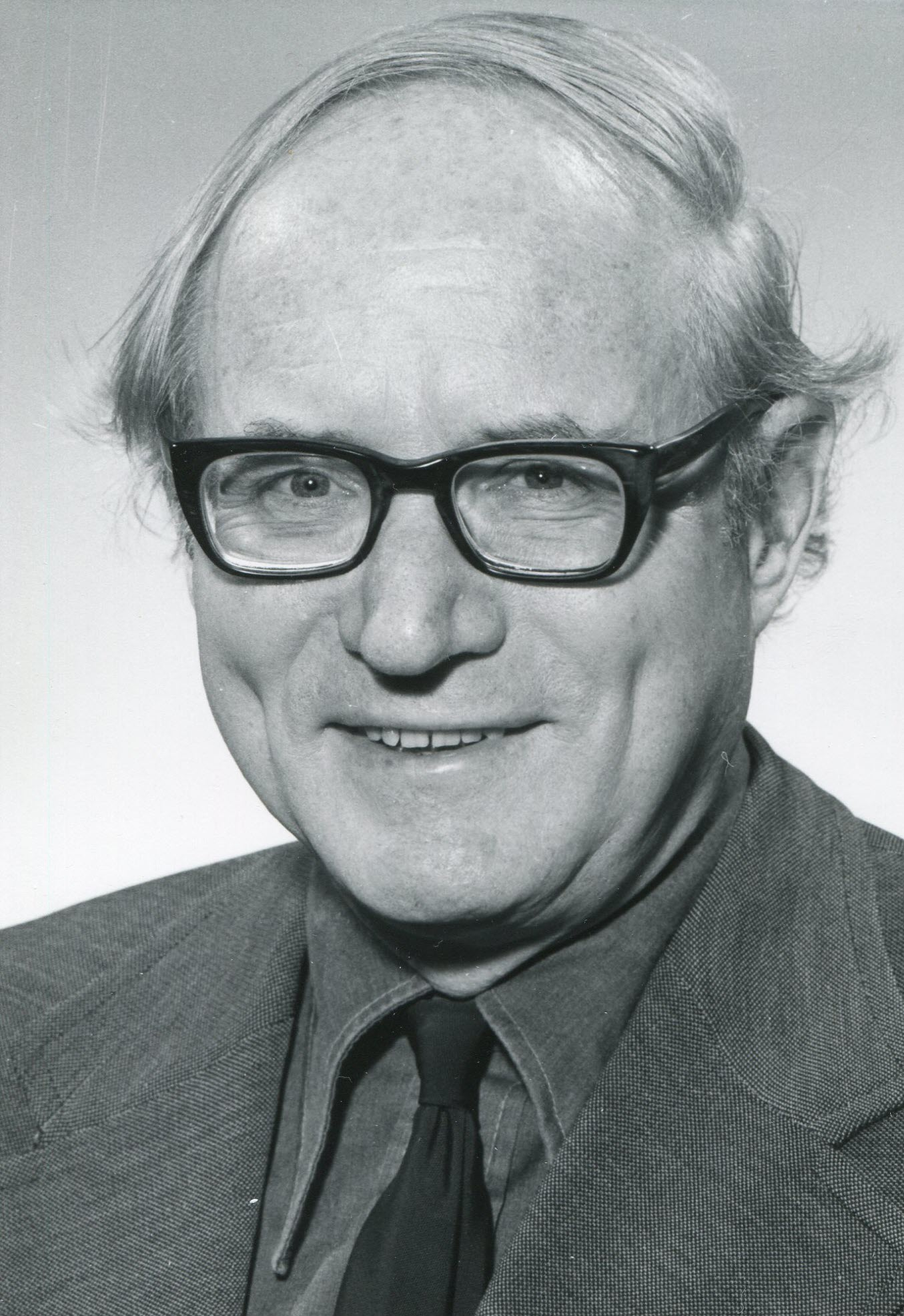

Member of the British Columbia Legislative Assembly for Vancouver East
- In office 12 September 1960 – 22 October 1986 Serving with Arthur Turner (1960-1966); Robert Williams (1966-1976, 1984-1986); Dave Barrett (1976-1984)
- Preceded by: Frederick Morton Sharp
- Succeeded by: Glen Clark

Member of Parliament for Vancouver Kingsway
- In office 10 June 1957 – 31 March 1958
- Preceded by: Angus MacInnis
- Succeeded by: John Ferguson Browne

Personal details
- Born: Alexander Barrett Macdonald; 21 October 1918 Vancouver, British Columbia, Canada
- Died: 5 March 2014 (aged 95) Vancouver, British Columbia, Canada
- Party: New Democratic; Co-operative Commonwealth Federation
- Spouse: Dorothy Anne Lewis
- Profession: Lawyer

Alexander Barrett Macdonald (21 October 1918 – 5 March 2014) was a Canadian politician who served for 26 years in the Legislative Assembly of British Columbia and briefly in the House of Commons of Canada. He was a barrister and solicitor by career.

The son of Malcolm Archibald Macdonald, Macdonald was educated at the University of British Columbia and Osgoode Hall. He worked with the Department of Munitions and Supplies in Ottawa during World War II. During that time, he married Dorothy Ann Lewis. After the war, he served as secretary for M. J. Coldwell and then practised law in Ontario for a short time. In 1948, he opened his own practice in Vancouver. He was an unsuccessful candidate in the 1949, 1952, 1953, and 1956 provincial elections.

He was elected to the Canadian Parliament in the riding of Vancouver Kingsway in the 1957 general election as a member of the Co-operative Commonwealth Federation. In the following year, he was defeated by John Ferguson Browne of the Progressive Conservative party in the 1958 election.

He was first elected to the B.C. legislature in the 1960 general election as the member for Vancouver East, and held this seat until his retirement in 1986. In 1972 he became Attorney General of British Columbia in the New Democratic Party government led by Dave Barrett and held this position until the NDP's defeat in the 1975 general election. He also served as Minister of Industrial Development, Trade and Commerce in 1972 and 1973. He wrote three books on politics and law: My Dear Legs (ISBN 0-919573-39-8), Alex in Wonderland (ISBN 0-921586-28-0), and Outrage: Canada's Justice System on Trial (ISBN 1-55192-230-4).

His wife of 64 years died in 2009. He died at the age of 95 on 5 March 2014.
