= Frederick Sharp =

Frederick Sharp may refer to:

- Frederick Sharp (baritone) (1911–1988), English operatic baritone
- Frederick Morton Sharp (1911–2002), Canadian politician in the Legislative Assembly of British Columbia
- Frederick Ralph Sharp (1915–1992), Royal Canadian Air Force officer
