= Harold Winch =

Canadian politician (1907–1993)

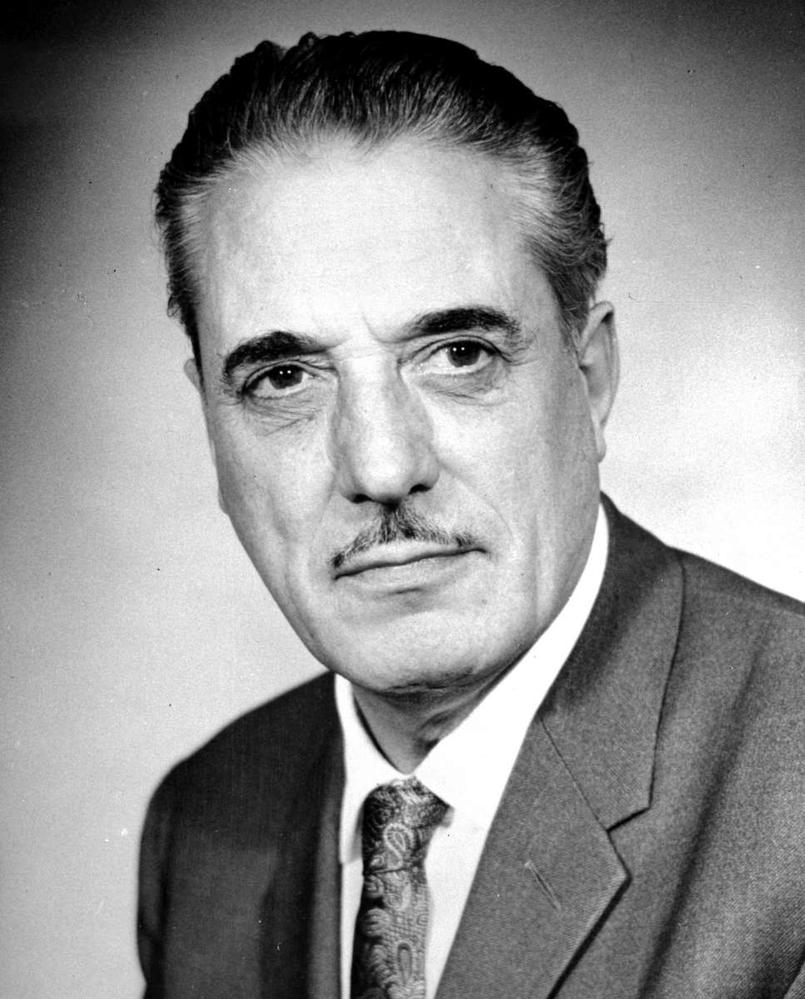
- Winch c. 1963

Leader of the Opposition of British Columbia
- In office February 3, 1953 – March 27, 1953
- Preceded by: Herbert Anscomb
- Succeeded by: Arnold Webster
- In office December 4, 1941 – January 19, 1952
- Preceded by: Royal Maitland
- Succeeded by: Herbert Anscomb

Leader of the Co-operative Commonwealth Federation (British Columbia Section)
- In office June 26, 1939 – April 10, 1953
- Preceded by: Robert Connell
- Succeeded by: Arnold Webster

Member of Parliament for Vancouver East
- In office August 10, 1953 – October 30, 1972
- Preceded by: Angus MacInnis
- Succeeded by: Paddy Neale

Member of the Legislative Assembly of British Columbia for Vancouver East
- In office November 2, 1933 – June 9, 1953 Serving with John Price, James Lyle Telford, and Arthur James Turner
- Preceded by: New district
- Succeeded by: Arnold Webster

Personal details
- Born: Harold Edward Winch; 18 June 1907 Loughton, England
- Died: 1 February 1993 (aged 85) White Rock, British Columbia
- Party: Co-operative Commonwealth Federation
- Spouses: Dorothy Ada Hutchinson, May 1929–Oct 1974; Jessie Margaret Frost, May 1981–Feb 1993
- Parent: Ernest Winch (father)
- Occupation: Electrician

Harold Edward Winch (18 June 1907 – 1 February 1993) was a Canadian politician active with the Co-operative Commonwealth Federation (CCF) and its successor, the New Democratic Party (NDP).

Winch was leader of the British Columbia CCF from 1938 to 1953, and Leader of the Opposition from October 1941 to February 1952 and then again from June 1952 to March 1953. He was called "the best leader of the Opposition that has ever been" by Premier W. A. C. Bennett.

== Biography ==
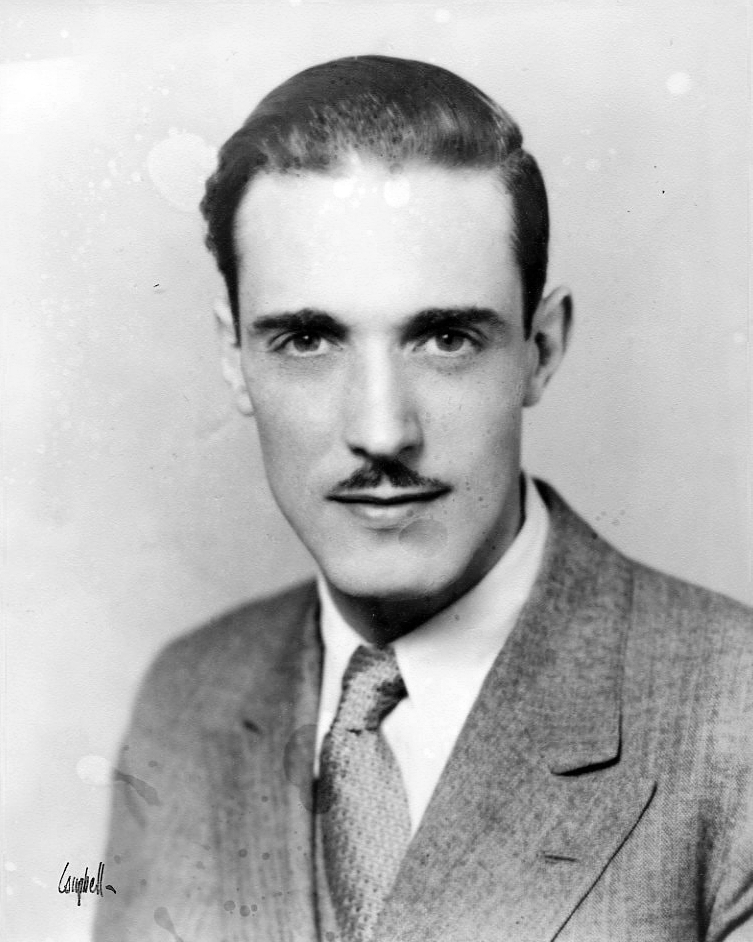
Winch in 1933

Winch was active during the relief camp strike in Vancouver that precipitated the On-to-Ottawa Trek in 1935, acting as a liaison between unemployed protesters and the government. He performed the same role as a new MLA in 1938, and assisted the police in ending a month-long occupation at the Vancouver Art Gallery on what became known as "Bloody Sunday".

Unlike other CCFers (such as Grace and Angus MacInnis), Winch and the BC CCF supported the internment of Japanese Canadians during World War II. Decades later, he conceded that this position was wrong.

An electrician by trade, Winch joined the CCF at its founding. He was first elected to the British Columbia Legislative Assembly in the 1933 provincial election as the Member of the Legislative Assembly (MLA) for Vancouver East. He became leader of the party following the 1937 general election and leader of the opposition in 1941. The CCF emerged from the 1952 provincial election with only one less seat than the British Columbia Social Credit Party. Social Credit formed a minority government, but was defeated in a motion of no confidence in March 1953. Winch opposed holding a new election, arguing that the CCF was able to form a new government. When the Liberal Party announced that it would not support a CCF government, a new election was called.

Winch stepped down as party leader, and entered federal politics. He was elected to the House of Commons of Canada in the 1953 federal election as the Member of Parliament for Vancouver East.

Winch survived the 1958 federal election that almost wiped the CCF out, and remained with the party as it transformed into the New Democratic Party in 1961. After winning seven successive elections as an MP, he retired from the House of Commons at the 1972 federal election.

Harold Winch's father, Ernest Edward Winch, was a CCF MLA from 1933 until his death in 1957.
