= Bryce Chudleigh Burt =

British colonial administrator (1881–1943)

Sir Bryce Chudleigh Burt CIE, MBE
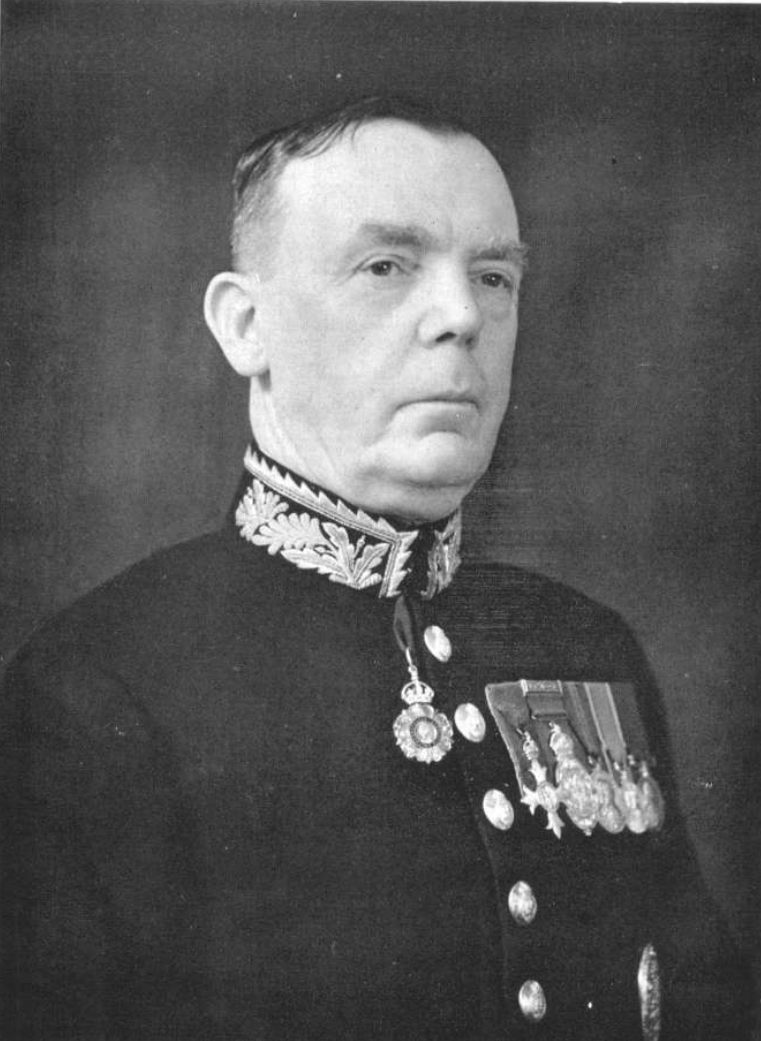
- Born: 29 April 1881; Newark-on-Trent, England
- Died: 2 January 1943 (aged 61); Colwyn Bay, Wales
- Education: Merchant Venturers' School, Bristol; University College, London (BSc)
- Awards: Kaiser-e-Hind (1912); Fellow of the Indian National Science Academy (1930); Knighthood (1936); Fellow of the Royal Society of Arts
- Scientific career
- Fields: Chemistry; Assistant Lecturer at Liverpool University; Assistant, Government Chemist, and Lecturer in Tropical Agriculture in Trinidad (1904-1908)
- Workplaces: Secretary and President, of ICCC, Bombay; Representative of the Asiatic Society on the Council of the National Institute of Sciences of India; President of the Indian Lac Cess Committee; President of the ICJC

Sir Bryce Chudleigh Burt CIE, MBE, FRSA (29 April 1881 – 2 January 1943) was an administrator in India during the British Raj. He was awarded a knighthood on 1 January 1936. He was previously been made a Companion of the Order of the Indian Empire in 1930 and a Member of the Order of the British Empire in 1919.

== Life and career ==
Bryce Chudleigh Burt was born on 29 April 1881 at Newark-on-Trent, England. He was educated at the Merchant Venturers' School, Bristol. Subsequently, he obtained a first class honours BSc (chemistry) from University College, London.

Beginning his career as an assistant lecturer at Liverpool University, before moving to India, Burt was the assistant government chemist and lecturer in tropical agriculture in Trinidad between 1904 and 1908. Based in Cawnpore, he was deputy director of agriculture for Uttar Pradesh from 1908 to 1921, having previously spent time collecting and classifying types of Indian wheat. From 1935 he was vice-chairman of the Imperial Council of Agricultural Research (later known as the Indian Council of Agricultural Research), for which he had been agricultural expert between 1929 and 1935. Having served as secretary between 1921 and 1928, he became president of the Indian Central Cotton Committee, a representative of the Asiatic Society on the Council of the National Institute of Sciences of India, and President of the Indian Lac Cess Committee. In addition, between 1936 and 1938 he served as the first president of the Indian Central Jute Committee (ICJC) and was the first chairman of the Indian Coffee Cess Committee.

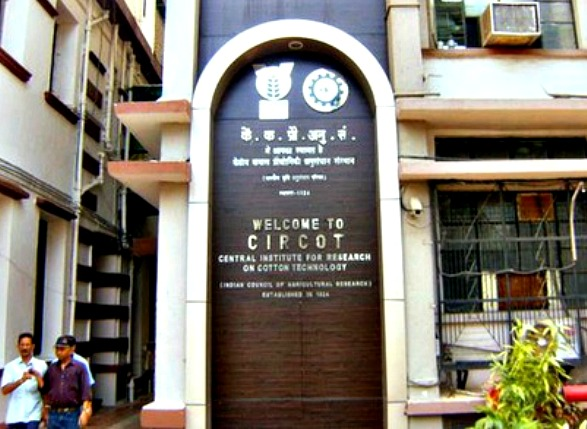
'Since then, Cotton research in India raised to greater heights'(2016)

== Secretary of ICCC ==
During 1921, McKenna committee (a representative body of the British Cotton Growing Association), recommended the Indian Central Cotton Committee (ICCC) to appoint Sir Chudleigh Burt Bryce, as its first secretary. The government of India set up the Cotton Committee for improving the production and marketing of Indian cotton. Today, ICCC wields a beneficent influence throughout India. Incidentally, he would have been the first to acknowledge the efficiency with which Arthur James Turner, established the Technological Laboratory, and controlled the technical research laboratories, belonging to the committee. Sir Bryce served 7 years.

== Later life ==
Burt had an Armstrong Siddeley Saloon De Luxe car (either a 12 Plus or 14 HP model) shipped to India in April 1936 and he left that country in April 1939. He lived at Allison Road, Rhos-on-Sea, Wales, in his latter years and died on 1 January 1943 at Colwyn Bay. Since leaving India he had been director of animal feeding stuffs for the Ministry of Food.

== Awards ==
- Burt was awarded the Kaiser-i-Hind Medal (1912)
- He was elected as a fellow of the Indian National Science Academy in 1930.
