= Robert Arthur Williams =

Canadian politician (1933–2024)

Bob Williams
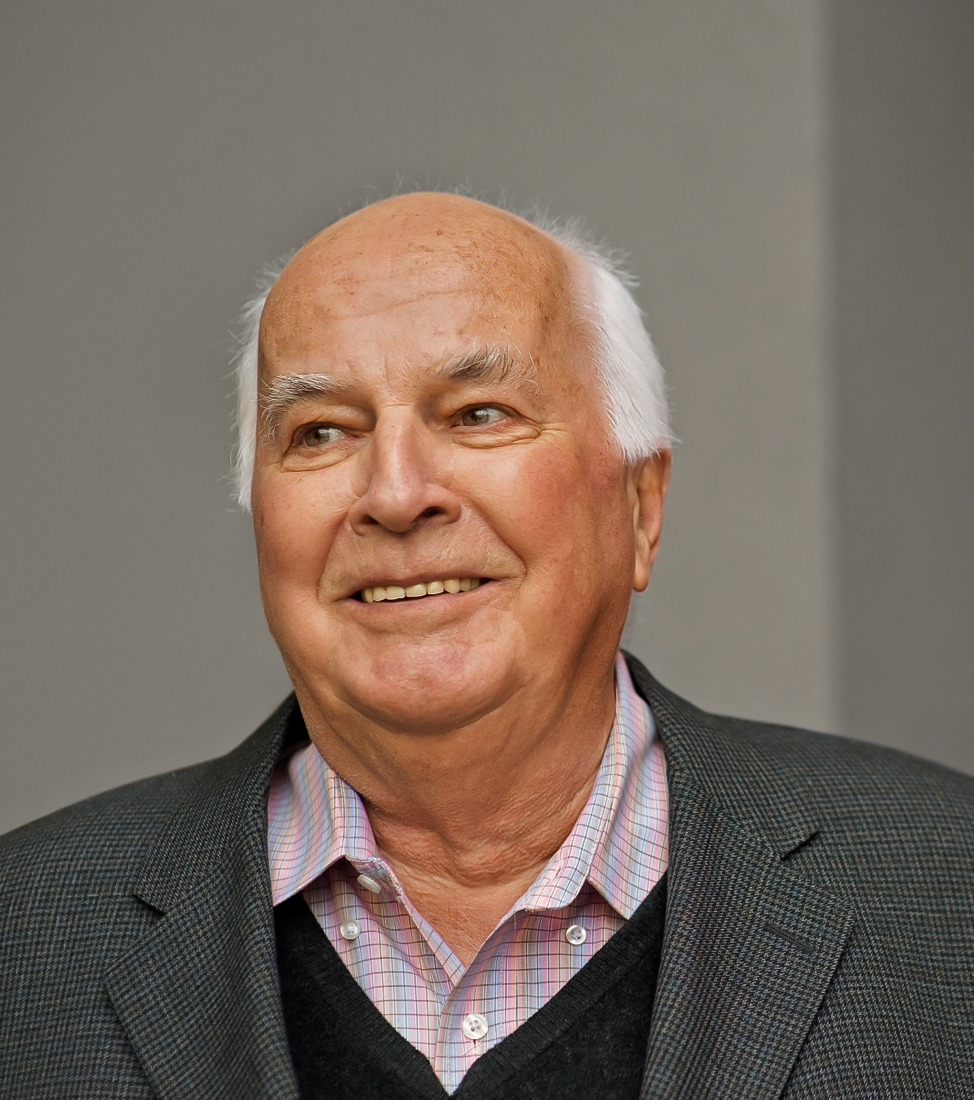
- Williams in 2010

Member of the British Columbia Legislative Assembly for Vancouver East
- In office September 12, 1966 – February 27, 1976 Serving with Alexander Macdonald
- Preceded by: Arthur Turner
- Succeeded by: Dave Barrett
- In office November 8, 1984 – October 17, 1991 Serving with Alexander Macdonald (1984–1986); Glen Clark (1986–1991)
- Preceded by: Dave Barrett
- Succeeded by: Riding Abolished

Personal details
- Born: Robert Arthur Williams; January 20, 1933 Vancouver, British Columbia, Canada
- Died: July 7, 2024 (aged 91) Vancouver, British Columbia, Canada
- Party: New Democratic; Co-operative Commonwealth Federation
- Profession: Consultant

Robert Arthur Williams (January 20, 1933 – July 7, 2024) was a Canadian consultant and political figure in British Columbia. He represented Vancouver East in the Legislative Assembly of British Columbia from 1966 to 1976 and from 1984 to 1991 as a New Democratic Party (NDP) member.

== Life and career ==
Williams was born in Vancouver, British Columbia, and was educated at the University of British Columbia, graduating from the School of Community and Regional Planning (SCARP). Williams worked as a town planning consultant. He served as an alderman for Vancouver from 1964 to 1966. From 2004 to 2006, he was a member of the Vancouver City Planning Commission, serving as its chair in 2005. He served in the provincial cabinet as Minister of Recreation and Conservation from 1972 to 1973 and as Minister of Lands, Forests and Water Resources from 1972 to 1975.

=== Political legacy ===
In the last capacity, Williams was responsible, or co-responsible, for the Royal Commission on Forestry (the Pearce Report); the Columbia Basin Trust; the purchase and management of Ocean Falls pulp and paper mills and township; the acquisition and management of Columbia Cellulose, renamed Canadian Cellulose, a sulphite, sawmill, and bleached kraft mills operation in Prince Rupert, Terrace, and Castlegar; the BC Assessment Authority; the Agricultural Land Reserve and Commission; the first resort-municipality in Canada, created for the Whistler/Blackcomb complex; as Minister of Parks, a doubling of Provincial Park acreage in British Columbia, including creation of the Spatsizi Plateau Wilderness Provincial Park, protecting 1.6 million acres (6,475 km^{2}) and the largest known herd of woodland caribou; Robson Square and its attendant Law Courts in downtown Vancouver; refurbishment and operation of the SS Princess Marguerite electric-diesel ferry service from Victoria to Seattle; and, expansion of the role and authority of the Environment and Land Use Secretariat. Later, as Deputy Minister for Crown Corporations, Williams helped lead creation of the West Coast Express, a new commuter train system running from the SkyTrain / SeaBus / Canada Line Waterfront Station in downtown Vancouver, in the former CPR Station, along CPR tracks to Mission, British Columbia, a distance of 69 km (43 miles). It began operation on 1 November 1995, and incorporates eight station stops all together. In 2015, annual ridership was reported at just under 3 million passengers.

Williams resigned from his seat in 1976 to allow Dave Barrett to be reelected to the assembly. The Forensic Audit of the Nanaimo Commonwealth Holding Society revealed that Williams received $80,000, 4 years' pay for an MLA at the time, from the NCHS. NDP MP and MLA David Stupich was convicted for taking that money away from Nanaimo Charities, using a small part to pay Williams, and passing some of it along to the NDP and to Unions such as the IWA.

=== Whistler Village ===
Seeing the potential that the area had to become a world-class ski destination, Williams was instrumental in saving Blackcomb Mountain from logging and establishing Whistler Village and the governing jurisdiction of the Resort Municipality of Whistler.

In the early 1970s, Al Raine, a former Canadian national ski team coach, and his Olympian wife Nancy Greene sent Williams a letter pleading for government action to stop the imminent logging of Blackcomb. Raine would also later have an instrumental role in designing and structuring the emergence of Whistler Village.

Whistler as a ski resort municipal jurisdiction was to be an experiment for the provincial government, and if successful, the model was intended to be replicated elsewhere in B.C. to create more tourism hubs.

=== Railway Club ===
In 1981, Williams purchased the Railway Club at 579 Dunsmuir in Vancouver. First opened as a working class bar in 1931, he opened it up to young musicians making careers in jazz, pop, country, rock, and fusions of same. Such artists as k.d. lang, Spirit of the West, Herald Nix and the Blue Shadows pioneered the place, and were later joined by innumerable Metro Vancouver musicians, and by such international acts as Cowboy Junkies, Blue Rodeo, The Tragically Hip, Barenaked Ladies, Los Lobos, Jonathan Richman, Green on Red and T Bone Burnett. He sold the club in 2008.

=== Surrey Central City ===
On 31 July 1998, Williams became the chair of ICBC. With the approval of Glen Clark's NDP government, he dedicated $250 million of the crown corporation's capital reserves to fund the construction of the Central City development – a 25-storey, 1.7-million-square-foot (15,790 m^{2}) office tower and shopping mall expansion project. The award-winning development, designed by Bing Thom, was driven forward as a catalyst for the revitalization and redevelopment of Whalley into Surrey's downtown core.

=== Vancity Credit Union ===
Williams served on the board of directors for Vancity Credit Union, Canada's largest credit union, from 1983 to 1995 and from 2007 to 2016.

In 1983, Vancity had nearly C$1.5 billion in assets. Loan delinquency, while below its 1982 peak, remained fairly constant. That year, the Board approved a loan loss provision of $6.5 million, about 0.66% of loans to credit union members. Williams' initial role on the Board was to ensure management had conducted due diligence in assessing loan quality. By 1986, the balance of non-productive loans was $3.7 million, reduced by 1989 to $1.8 million.

During Williams' first five years as director, Vancity became the first financial institution in Canada to introduce ATMs. The credit union's community role had been limited to philanthropy (about $60,000 in grants), and social and co-op housing loans (about $42 million). With Williams on the Board, the credit union began lending to business. Vancity's book of business was previously confined to personal mortgages, personal financing and commercial mortgages. This shift to business lending with a focus on economic development was the precursor to Vancity's social business model which developed over the ensuing decade.

A seed capital program was launched in 1985, designed to support businesses that didn't qualify for conventional financing. By 1986 Vancity had financed nearly 600 business loans under this program.

Williams became the chair of the board in 1988. That year his chair's message introduced the idea of Vancity setting community and social objectives, and becoming a more entrepreneurial institution: "As [Vancity's] business performance improves [we] expect to do more innovative work in the social sphere." The assets were now $1.7 billion, and advancing social innovation was now an overt part of the agenda.

Together with other Directors, Williams led creation of the Vancity Community Foundation. In 1989, the Foundation was endowed with $1.2 million. Even after dividends, income taxes and this donation, net earnings were $5.3 million, a significant improvement from the previous year, and up from $2 million in 1984 five years earlier. The Foundation was to act as a catalyst for the growth and empowerment of disadvantaged groups and communities served by Vancity through providing loans, technical assistance or funds for community economic development and housing alternatives.

Williams also led the creation of Vancity Enterprises Ltd in 1989, which was established as a wholly owned real estate investment and development subsidiary of the credit union. Its mandate was to provide affordable housing through innovative development strategies involving community groups, churches and governments. In its first year, Vancity Enterprises (VCE) worked on several mixed-used commercial and social housing developments.

By the time of Williams' third year as chair (1990), Vancity's assets totalled $2.26 billion, with profits before taxes and dividends exceeding $9.3 million. In his Chair's message, Williams introduced the idea of "social accounting". He listed Vancity's social achievements, including lending programs for women working at home and peer lending under the auspices of the Vancity Community Foundation. Vancity Enterprise was building a new branch with 34 apartment units on the upper three floors for single parents. That year Vancity extended a loan to the Sher-A-Punjab, a community centre initiated by the Sikh community in North Surrey, and created the EnviroFund, which allocated a percentage of Vancity Visa card revenues to environmental initiatives.

As Vancity's rules limit director terms to 12 years, Williams retired from the Board in 1995. He continued his role as a volunteer adviser on a number of projects, including the creation of the Vancity Capital Corporation, founded in 1997, which Vancity capitalized with $25 million. Its purpose was to provide subordinated debt financing to growing companies, especially those which had a social mandate. Williams was Founding Board Chairperson at Vancity Capital, and hired its first CEO, David Mowat, who remained as CEO until recruited to be the Vancity Credit Union CEO in 2000.

Williams also led efforts to establish the Bologna Summer Program. It was created in 2001, and jointly managed by Vancity, the University of Bologna and the BC Cooperative Association. Its purpose was and remains the training of Vancity staff and associates in the mechanics of cooperative enterprise, the idea of a social dividend, and the strengthening of the co-op credit model in every aspect. He particularly engaged the well-known scholar of co-operative economics, Pier Luigi Sacco, in this international model, which has continued to present.

Beginning in 2013, as a member of the board of Vancity, and later as chair of the Jim Green Foundation, Williams also helped lead the re-purposing, re-design, and re-construction of the former Vancouver Police Department Main Station. Closed by the City in 2011, the old 312 Main Street Station is now becoming a 100,000 sq ft (9,290 m^{2}) Centre for Social and Economic Innovation. To some extent, it has been modelled on the Toronto Centre for Social Innovation.

=== Personal life and death ===
Robert Arthur Williams was the grandson of Bill Pritchard and the great-grandson of James Pritchard, early socialist pioneers in British Columbia.

In 2012, Williams was made an Honorary Member of the Architectural Institute of British Columbia, in recognition of his contribution to urban design, planning, and building in that province. On 15 March 2017, Simon Fraser University announced the granting of a Doctor of Laws, Honoris Causa, to Williams: "His leadership, inspiration and action over the past 60 years have helped to improve and transform B.C.'s rural and urban communities, and the lives of its citizens."

Williams died after a long illness in Vancouver, on July 7, 2024, at the age of 91.
