= Coquitlam (electoral district) =

Defunct provincial electoral district in British Columbia, Canada

Coquitlam was a provincial electoral district in the Canadian province of British Columbia from 1966 to 1975. The riding's successor was the Coquitlam-Moody riding.

== Electoral history ==
28th British Columbia election, 1966
Party	Candidate	Votes	%	±	Expenditures
New Democratic	Dave Barrett	9,517	55.20%		unknown
Social Credit	Rene Jules Gamache	6,065	35.18%	–	unknown
Liberal	Eileen Marguerite Ripley	1,658	9.62%	–	unknown
Total valid votes		17,240	100.00%		
Total rejected ballots		155			
Turnout		%			

29th British Columbia election, 1969
Party	Candidate	Votes	%	±	Expenditures
New Democrat	Dave Barrett	12,948	47.67%		unknown
Social Credit	Poul E. Hansen	8,195	30.17%	–	unknown
Liberal	Michael Forrest Angus	6,018	22.16%	–	unknown
Total valid votes		27,161	100.00%		
Total rejected ballots		213			
Turnout		%			

30th British Columbia election, 1972
Party	Candidate	Votes	%	±	Expenditures
New Democratic	Dave Barrett	19,374	57.28%		unknown
Social Credit	John Edward Mayon Robinson	7,360	21.76%	–	unknown
Liberal	Howard Arthur John Paish	5,053	14.94%	–	unknown
Progressive Conservative	Faith Helen Elly Trent	2,035	6.02%		unknown
Total valid votes		33,822	100.00%		
Total rejected ballots		234			
Turnout		%			

31st British Columbia election, 1975
Party	Candidate	Votes	%	±	Expenditures
Social Credit	George Herman Kerster	18,681	47.60%	–	unknown
New Democratic	Dave Barrett	18,663	47.55%		unknown
Liberal	Thomas Osborne	1,652	4.21%	–	unknown
Independent	Bernd Fritz Stoelzle	99	0.25%		unknown
Independent	Larry William Johnson	73	0.19%		unknown
Communist	Christine Beynon	61	0.16%		unknown
North American Labour Party	Alan Levinson	17	0.04%		unknown
Total valid votes		39,246	100.00%		
Total rejected ballots		319			
Turnout		%			

== See also ==
- List of British Columbia provincial electoral districts
- Canadian provincial electoral districts

Legislative Assembly of British Columbia
Preceded by South Okanagan	Constituency represented by the premier 1972–1975	Succeeded by South Okanagan
Preceded by Cowichan-Malahat	Constituency represented by the leader of the Opposition; 1969–1977	Succeeded by South Okanagan
