= Bob Skelly =

Canadian politician (1943–2022)

Bob Skelly MP
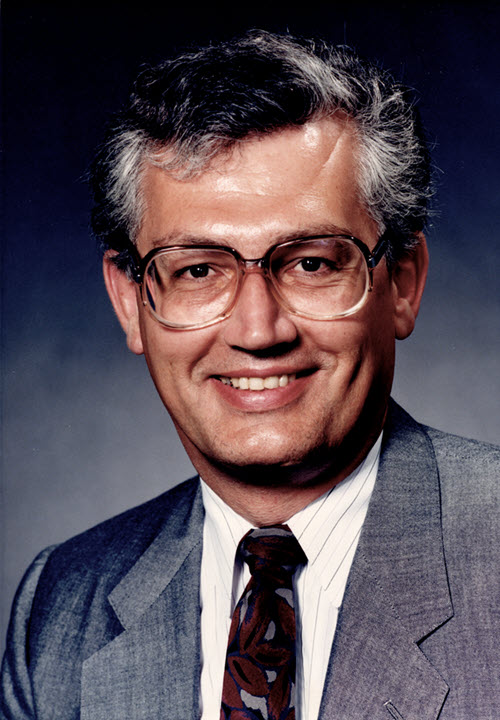

Leader of the Opposition of British Columbia
- In office 20 May 1984 – 12 April 1987
- Preceded by: Dave Barrett
- Succeeded by: Michael Harcourt

Leader of the British Columbia New Democratic Party
- In office 20 May 1984 – 12 April 1987
- Preceded by: Dave Barrett
- Succeeded by: Michael Harcourt

Member of the Canadian Parliament for Comox—Alberni
- In office 12 December 1988 – 8 September 1993
- Preceded by: Riding created
- Succeeded by: Bill Gilmour

Member of the British Columbia Legislative Assembly for Alberni
- In office 15 September 1972 – 10 May 1988
- Preceded by: Howard McDiarmid
- Succeeded by: Gerard Janssen

Personal details
- Born: 14 April 1943 New Westminster, British Columbia, Canada
- Died: 6 August 2022 (aged 79) Colwood, British Columbia, Canada
- Party: New Democratic Party
- Other political affiliations: British Columbia New Democratic Party (provincial)
- Spouse: Sonia Alex Skelly
- Education: University of British Columbia
- Occupation: Politician

Robert Evan Skelly (14 April 1943 – 6 August 2022) was a Canadian politician from British Columbia.

Skelly was born 14 April 1943, at New Westminster, British Columbia. The son of Robert Daniel Skelly and Dorothy Graham, he was educated at the University of British Columbia. In 1965, he married Sonia Alexandra Shewchuk. He had a daughter, Susan Kathleen Skelly, born 1973; and a son, Robert Mark William Skelly, born 1975. Susan married Michael Ramsay, and they have three children: Rebecca Ruth, born 2001; Sarah-Grace Victoria, born 2002; and Maria Anne Heather, born 2010.

He served in the BC Legislature from 1972 to 1987. The longest-serving member for Alberni constituency in history, he was elected five times. Skelly began his career as MLA by making his maiden speech in the Legislature on recognizing aboriginal rights in British Columbia. He became environment critic for the NDP. He was opposed to uranium mining and worked with the Skagit Valley committee against using nuclear power in Canada. He opposed the river dam at Site C on the Peace River, and the diversion of the Fraser watershed into the Arctic Sea. After visiting Bernie Sanders in Vermont, he proposed the construction of a number of 50 megawatt wood fired electric generators. He also campaigned to have the Esquimalt and Nanaimo Railway continue its operation as promised by the Dominion government of 1871.

He was elected leader of the British Columbia New Democratic Party in 1984 and was Opposition Leader in the BC Legislature until 1987. During his campaign as leader of the NDP leading up to the 1986 election he made such gains that the Social Credit Party convinced Bennet to resign and replaced him with Bill Vander Zalm. The Social Credit Party went on to win 47 seats to the NDP's 22. The NDP had dropped in popular vote from the previous election, but scored a higher percentage than in the elections in 1972, 1991 and 1996. After the election, the distribution of electoral districts in the province was declared to be biased in favour of Social Credit. The courts then ordered a fair redistribution. In 1986, Skelly resigned as NDP leader, and the following year, a party convention acclaimed Michael Harcourt as his successor.

In late 1988 Skelly was elected to the House of Commons of Canada representing the Federal riding of Comox—Alberni from 1988 to 1993.

He became Aboriginal Affairs critic and was present during the Oka crisis. He ran for a second term, but was defeated in the 1993 general election in which the New Democratic Party collapsed to nine seats.

Skelly served in Parliament at the same time as his brother Ray Skelly.

Skelly died of Parkinson's disease, aged 79, in Colwood, British Columbia, on 6 August 2022.

Parliament of Canada
Preceded by Riding did not exist	Members of Parliament from Comox—Alberni; 1988–1993	Succeeded by Bill Gilmour
