= George Herman Kerster =

Canadian politician

George Herman Kerster (born March 2, 1937) is a former car dealer and political figure in British Columbia. He represented Coquitlam in the Legislative Assembly of British Columbia from 1975 to 1979 as a Social Credit member.

He was born in Lafleche, Saskatchewan, the son of Gustave A. Kerster and Marjorie P. Gohn, and was educated in Fort William, Ontario, in North Battleford, Saskatchewan and in Weyburn, Saskatchewan. In 1959, he married Helen K. Bartels. Kerster was a 1st lieutenant in the Regina militia. He later moved to Coquitlam, British Columbia. Kerster defeated then NDP premier Dave Barrett by 18 votes to win his assembly seat in 1975. He was defeated by Norman Levi in 1979 when he ran for reelection in the new riding of Coquitlam-Maillardville. In 2001, Kerster was convicted of trying to buy sex from a minor.
