= John Price (Canadian politician) =

Canadian politician

Jack Price
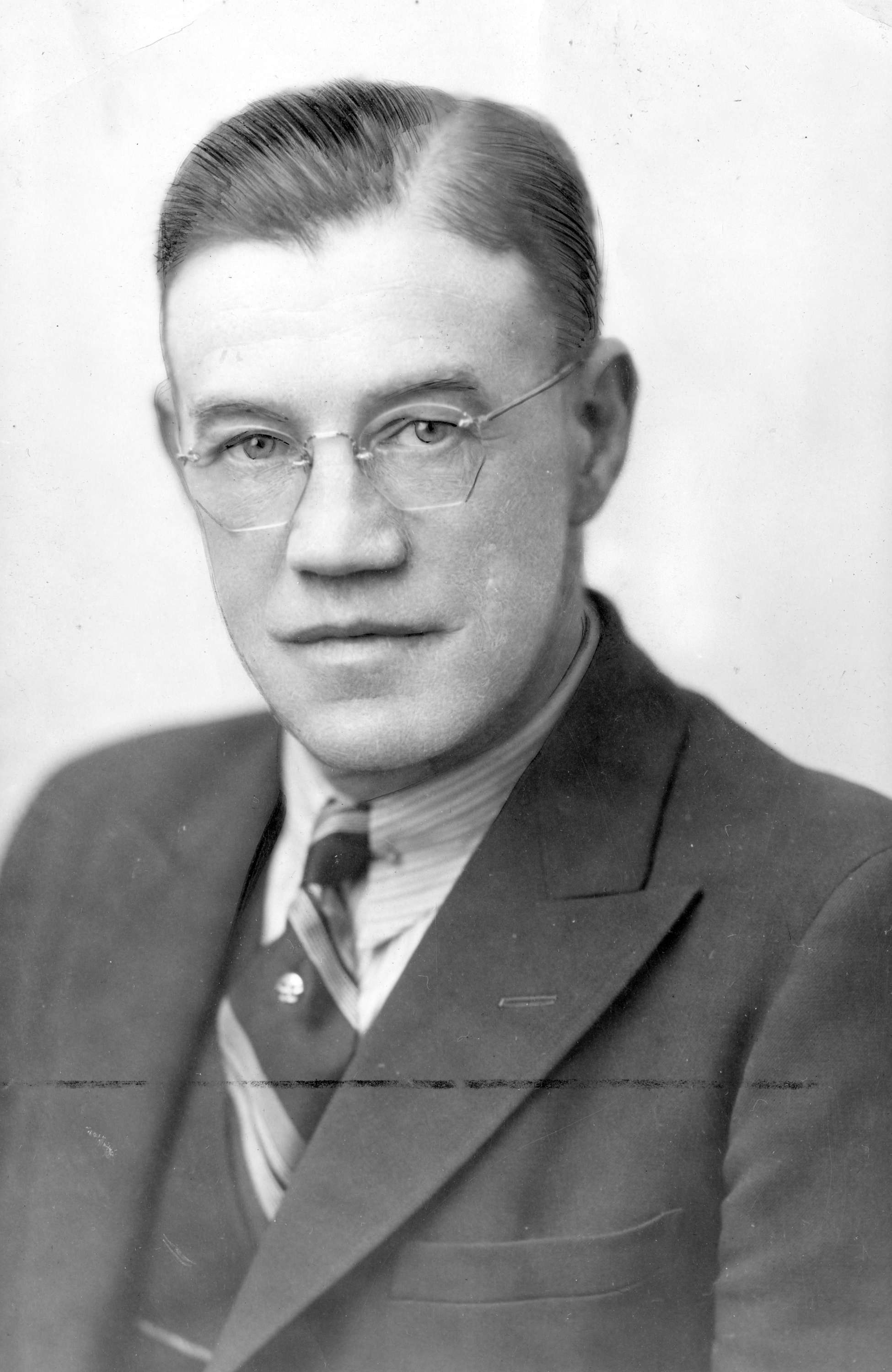
- Price in 1939

Member of the Legislative Assembly of British Columbia
- In office 1933–1937
- Constituency: Vancouver East

Personal details
- Born: April 10, 1883 Swansea, Wales
- Died: April 8, 1956 (aged 72) Vancouver, British Columbia
- Party: Co-operative Commonwealth Federation
- Spouse: Mary Todd
- Occupation: motorman

John Price (April 10, 1883 – April 8, 1956) was a Canadian politician. He served in the Legislative Assembly of British Columbia from 1933 to 1937, being elected in the electoral district of Vancouver East as a member of the Co-operative Commonwealth Federation party.

Price and William Arthur Pritchard ran for the Constructive Party in the two-seat Vancouver East district in 1937. None of the Constructive candidates were elected. He was a motorman with the British Columbia Electric Railway and also served as an alderman on the Vancouver City Council in the 1940s. He died of a heart attack in 1956.
