= Leader of the Opposition (British Columbia) =

Position in the Legislative Assembly of British Columbia

- Chef de l'Opposition
- Incumbent; Jennifer Whiteside since November 20, 2026
- Official Opposition; Legislative Assembly of British Columbia
- Member of: Legislative Assembly of British Columbia
- Seat: British Columbia Parliament Buildings
- Term length: While leader of the largest party not in government
- Inaugural holder: James Mackenzie McDonald
- Formation: November 7, 1871; 155 years ago
- Salary: CA$59,766.37 (2024) (Note: This number does not include the base salary received by all BC MLAs.)

The leader of the Opposition (French: chef de l'Opposition) is the member of the Legislative Assembly (MLA) in the Legislative Assembly of British Columbia who leads the political party recognized as the Official Opposition. This position generally goes to the leader of the largest party in the Legislative Assembly that is not in government.

== History ==
Prior to the 1903 election, British Columbia politics operated as a non-partisan democracy. Members often declared themselves to be supporters of the government or of the opposition, but the labels were informal and the lines often shifted. The most prominent member of the opposition was often called the "leader of the Opposition", but the position was not officially recognized until the introduction of formalized party politics.

== List of leaders of the Opposition ==
Portrait	Opposition leader	Constituency	Assumed office	Left office	Party
	James Alexander MacDonald (1858–1939)	Rossland City	October 19, 1903	October 10, 1909	Liberal
	John Oliver (1856–1927)	Delta	October 10, 1909	November 25, 1909	Liberal
	vacant (Note: John Oliver lost his seat in the 1909 election.)	—N/a	November 25, 1909	January 1910	Liberal
	James Hurst Hawthornthwaite (Note: The 1909 election saw four opposition members, two Liberals and two Socialists, elected. As seats were assigned by alphabetical order, Hawthornthwaite physically occupied the seat typical of the Opposition leader. Hawthornthwaite initially rejected the idea of being leader, but was later reported to have "assumed the functions of Opposition leader". However, by the next session, Brewster was being referred to as Opposition leader.) (1863–1926)	Nanaimo City	January 1910	March 1910	Socialist
	Harlan Carey Brewster (1870–1918)	Alberni	January 1910	March 28, 1912	Liberal
	Parker Williams (Note: Declined to be named Opposition leader, but was referred to as such by the media and received the appropriate salary.) (1872–1958)	Newcastle	March 1912	March 1, 1916	Socialist
	Harlan Carey Brewster (Note: Became Opposition leader mid-legislature after by-election victories.) (1870–1918)	Victoria City	March 1, 1916	November 23, 1916	Liberal
	William John Bowser (1867–1933)	Vancouver City	November 23, 1916	June 20, 1924	Conservative
	Robert Henry Pooley (Note: After party leader William John Bowser lost his seat in the 1924 election, house leader Robert Henry Pooley became leader of the Opposition. In 1926 Simon Fraser Tolmie was elected Conservative leader but he did not seek a seat in the legislature until the 1928 provincial election, which his party won.) (1878–1954)	Esquimalt	August 1924	July 18, 1928	Conservative
	Duff Pattullo (1873–1956)	Prince Rupert	January 1929	November 15, 1933	Liberal
	Robert Connell (1871–1957)	Victoria City	November 15, 1933	June 1, 1937	Co-operative Commonwealth
	Robert Connell (1871–1957)	Victoria City	November 15, 1933	June 1, 1937	Social Reconstructive (Note: Connell was exeplled from the CCF in 1936 for opposing party policy. He and three other CCF MLAs formed the "Social Reconstructive" party. With a total of 4 MLAs compared to 3 remaining in the CCF, Connell's new party was the second largest in the legislature allowing him to retain the title of "leader of the Official Opposition".)
	Frank Porter Patterson (1876–1938)	Dewdney	June 1, 1937	February 10, 1938	Conservative
	vacant (Note: Patterson died on office on February 10, 1938, leaving the post vacant until the Conservatives chose Royal Maitland as their leader in September.)	—N/a	February 10, 1938	September 1938	Conservative
	Royal Maitland (1889–1946)	Vancouver-Point Grey	September 1938	October 21, 1941	Conservative
	Harold Winch (1907–1993)	Vancouver East	October 21, 1941	January 19, 1952	Co-operative Commonwealth
	Herbert Anscomb (Note: Anscomb's Conservatives had been part of a coalition government with the Liberals until late 1951 when the Liberals decided to terminate the arrangement and Premier John Hart dropped his Conservative ministers from Cabinet. The Tories moved to the opposition benches and displaced the CCF to form the Official Opposition from February 1952 until the June 1952 provincial election.) (1892–1972)	Oak Bay	January 19, 1952	June 12, 1952	Progressive Conservative
	Harold Winch (1907–1993)	Vancouver East	June 12, 1952	April 10, 1953	Co-operative Commonwealth
	Arnold Webster (1899–1979)	Vancouver East	April 10, 1953	April 6, 1956	Co-operative Commonwealth
	Robert Strachan (1913–1981)	Cowichan-Newcastle (until 1966) Cowichan-Malahat (from 1966)	April 6, 1956	April 12, 1969	Co-operative Commonwealth (Note: The CCF became the NDP in 1961 as a result of the creation of the federal New Democratic Party.)
	Robert Strachan (1913–1981)	Cowichan-Newcastle (until 1966) Cowichan-Malahat (from 1966)	April 6, 1956	April 12, 1969	New Democratic
	vacant (Note: Some sources name Thomas R. Berger as leader of the Official Opposition from 1969–1970 as he was the leader of the second largest party in the Legislative Assembly. However, he never sat in the Legislative Assembly during this time and could not have been called upon by the speaker as leader of the Opposition.)	—N/a	April 12, 1969	September 1969	New Democratic
	Dave Barrett (1930–2018)	Coquitlam	September 1969	September 15, 1972	New Democratic
	W. A. C. Bennett (1900–1979)	South Okanagan	September 15, 1972	June 5, 1973	Social Credit
	Frank Richter Jr. (1910–1977)	Boundary-Similkameen	June 5, 1973	November 24, 1973	Social Credit
	Bill Bennett (1932–2015)	South Okanagan	November 24, 1973	December 22, 1975	Social Credit
	William King (Note: Barrett lost his seat in the December 1975 general election and re-entered the legislature through a June 1976 by-election. William Stewart King acted as leader of the Opposition in the house in the interim. Barrett continued as leader of the party during this period.) (1930–2020)	Revelstoke-Slocan	December 22, 1975	June 3, 1976	New Democratic
	Dave Barrett (1930–2018)	Vancouver East	June 3, 1976	May 20, 1984	New Democratic
	Bob Skelly (1943–2022)	Alberni	May 20, 1984	April 12, 1987	New Democratic
	Mike Harcourt (born 1943)	Vancouver Centre	April 12, 1987	November 5, 1991	New Democratic
	Gordon Wilson (born 1949)	Powell River-Sunshine Coast	November 5, 1991	February 1993	Liberal
	Fred Gingell (1930–1999)	Delta South	February 1993	February 17, 1994	Liberal
	Gordon Campbell (born 1948)	Vancouver-Quilchena (until 1996) Vancouver-Point Grey (from 1996)	February 17, 1994	June 5, 2001	Liberal
	Joy MacPhail (Note: MacPhail served as the interim leader of the New Democrats from 2001 to 2003. After Carole James became party leader in 2003, MacPhail remained the leader of the Opposition until James won a seat in the 2005 election.) (born 1952)	Vancouver-Hastings	June 5, 2001	May 17, 2005	New Democratic
	Carole James (born 1957)	Victoria-Beacon Hill	May 17, 2005	January 20, 2011	New Democratic
	Dawn Black (born 1943)	New Westminster	January 20, 2011	April 17, 2011	New Democratic
	Adrian Dix (born 1964)	Vancouver-Kingsway	April 17, 2011	May 4, 2014	New Democratic
	John Horgan (1959–2024)	Juan de Fuca	May 4, 2014	July 18, 2017	New Democratic
	Christy Clark (born 1965)	Kelowna West	July 18, 2017	August 4, 2017	Liberal
	Rich Coleman (born 1956)	Langley East	August 4, 2017	February 3, 2018	Liberal
	Andrew Wilkinson (born 1958)	Vancouver-Quilchena	February 3, 2018	November 21, 2020	Liberal
	Shirley Bond (born 1956 or 1957)	Prince George-Valemount	November 23, 2020	April 30, 2022	Liberal
	Kevin Falcon (born 1963)	Vancouver-Quilchena	April 30, 2022	October 19, 2024	Liberal
	Kevin Falcon (born 1963)	Vancouver-Quilchena	April 30, 2022	October 19, 2024	BC United (Note: The BC Liberal Party changed its name to BC United on April 12, 2023.)
	John Rustad (born 1961)	Nechako Lakes	October 19, 2024	December 4, 2025	Conservative
	Trevor Halford (Note: Trevor Halford served as interim leader of the Conservative Party from December 4, 2025, to May 30, 2026. After Kerry-Lynne Findlay became the leader of the Conservatives, Halford remained the leader of the Opposition due to Findlay not having a seat in the Legislative Assembly. On June 29, 2026, the party named Heather Maahs the parliamentary leader, replacing Halford as leader of the Opposition.)	Surrey-White Rock	December 4, 2025	June 29, 2026	Conservative
	Heather Maahs	Chilliwack North	June 29, 2026	September 20, 2026	Conservative
	Lorne Doerkson (Note: Following the resignation of Kerry-Lynne Findlay as Conservative leader, Lorne Doerkson was appointed as the interim leader of the Conservative Party, making him the leader of the Opposition.) (born 1968)	Cariboo-Chilcotin	September 20, 2026	November 20, 2026	Conservative
	Jennifer Whiteside	New Westminster-Coquitlam	November 26, 2026	present	New Democratic
