= Arnold Webster =

Canadian politician (1899–1979)

Arnold Alexander Webster

Member of Parliament for Vancouver Kingsway
- In office September 1962 – September 1965

Personal details
- Born: 9 March 1899 Vancouver, British Columbia, Canada
- Died: 27 July 1979 (aged 80)
- Party: Co-operative Commonwealth Federation

Arnold Alexander Webster (9 March 1899 – 27 July 1979) was a Canadian politician and served as Leader of the Opposition and leader of the BC Co-operative Commonwealth Federation (now known as the British Columbia NDP). He returned to politics as a Member of Parliament for the federal New Democratic Party in the 1960s.

== Biography ==
Webster was born in Vancouver and raised in Agassiz, B.C. After obtaining a Master of Arts from the University of British Columbia and a Bachelor of Pedagogy at the University of Toronto. He became a teacher and later a principal in Vancouver.

Webster joined the CCF in 1932 and became president of the British Columbia section of the party. He ran for a seat in the House of Commons of Canada on behalf of the CCF in 1935, 1940, 1945 and 1949 but was unsuccessful. In 1953, he was elected leader of the BC CCF succeeding Harold Winch and was elected Member of the Legislative Assembly for Vancouver East in the 1953 general election becoming Leader of the Opposition. He left politics in 1956 but returned in the 1962 federal election to run for the New Democratic Party and was elected to the House of Commons of Canada from Vancouver Kingsway. He was re-elected in 1963 but did not run again in the 1965 federal election.

During his term as Leader of the Opposition in British Columbia, Webster urged the adoption of a provincial bill of rights. In his political career he also opposed the testing and stockpiling of nuclear weapons.

In 1955, Webster married Daisy de Jong who went on to serve in the British Columbia assembly from 1972 to 1975.

Preceded by Harold Winch	Leader of the BC Co-operative Commonwealth Federation; 1953–1956	Succeeded by Robert Strachan
Preceded by Harold Winch	Leader of the Opposition in the British Columbia Legislature; 1953–1956	Succeeded by Robert Strachan
