= Arthur Turner (Australian footballer) =

Australian rules footballer

Personal information
- Full name: Arthur Turner
- Born: 13 January 1920
- Died: 28 October 2005 (aged 85)
- Height: 177 cm (5 ft 10 in)
- Weight: 75 kg (165 lb)

Playing career^{1}
Years	Club	Games (Goals)
1940, 1942	South Melbourne	3 (0)
- ^{1} Playing statistics correct to the end of 1942.

Arthur Turner (13 January 1920 – 28 October 2005) was an Australian rules footballer who played for the South Melbourne Football Club in the Victorian Football League (VFL).
