= Dave Barrett =

Premier of British Columbia from 1972 to 1975

Dave Barrett OC OBC
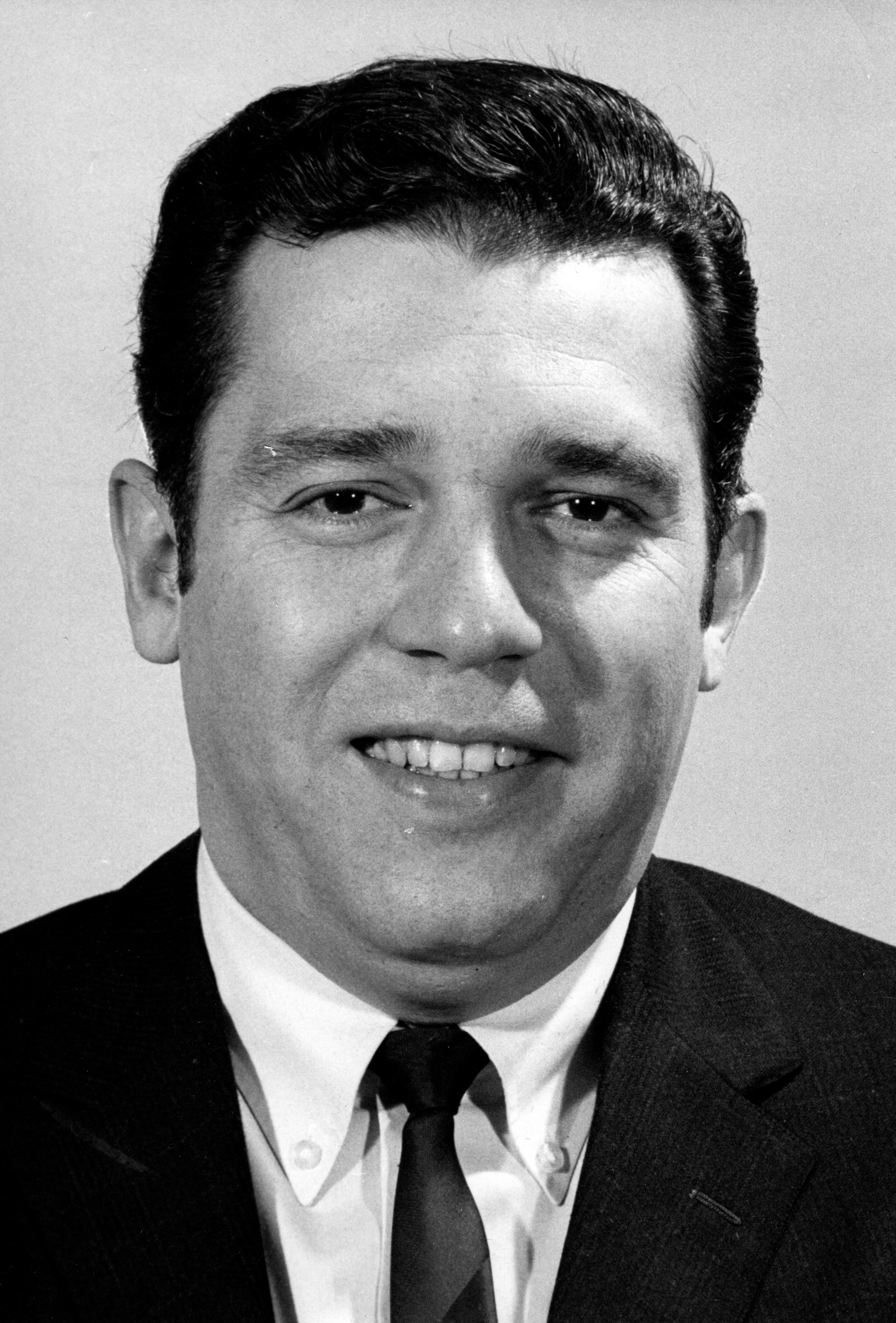
- Barrett in 1975

26th Premier of British Columbia
- In office September 15, 1972 – December 22, 1975
- Monarch: Elizabeth II
- Lieutenant Governor: John Robert Nicholson; Walter Stewart Owen
- Deputy: Eileen Dailly
- Preceded by: W. A. C. Bennett
- Succeeded by: Bill Bennett

Leader of the British Columbia New Democratic Party
- In office September 5, 1969 – May 20, 1984
- Preceded by: Thomas R. Berger
- Succeeded by: Bob Skelly

Leader of the Opposition of British Columbia
- In office December 22, 1975 – May 20, 1984
- Preceded by: William King
- Succeeded by: Bob Skelly
- In office September 5, 1969 – September 15, 1972
- Preceded by: Thomas R. Berger
- Succeeded by: W. A. C. Bennett
Legislative constituencies
Member of Parliament for Esquimalt—Juan de Fuca
In office November 21, 1988 – October 25, 1993
| Preceded by | Riding established |
| Succeeded by | Keith Martin |
Member of the Legislative Assembly of British Columbia for Vancouver East
In office June 3, 1976 – June 1, 1984 Serving with Robert Williams
| Preceded by | Alexander Macdonald; Robert Arthur Williams |
| Succeeded by | Robert Arthur Williams; Glen Clark |
Member of the Legislative Assembly of British Columbia for Coquitlam
In office September 12, 1966 – December 11, 1975
| Preceded by | Riding established |
| Succeeded by | George Herman Kerster |
Member of the Legislative Assembly of British Columbia for Dewdney
In office September 12, 1960 – September 12, 1966
| Preceded by | Lyle Wicks |
| Succeeded by | George Mussallem |

Personal details
- Born: October 2, 1930 Vancouver, British Columbia
- Died: February 2, 2018 (aged 87) Victoria, British Columbia
- Citizenship: Canadian
- Party: New Democratic; BC NDP
- Spouse: Shirley Hackman
- Children: 3
- Education: Seattle University; Saint Louis University
- Profession: Social worker

David Barrett OC OBC (October 2, 1930 – February 2, 2018) was a Canadian politician and social worker in British Columbia. A member of the British Columbia New Democratic Party (BCNDP), he was the 26th premier of British Columbia from 1972 to 1975. He was the first NDP premier in the province.

== Early life and career ==
Barrett was born in Vancouver, British Columbia, the son of Rose and Samuel Barrett, a peddler. His family was Jewish. His mother was from Odesa, and his paternal grandparents were immigrants from Russia.

Barrett described his father as a Fabian socialist and his mother as a Communist who voted CCF.

Barrett graduated from Seattle University with a degree in philosophy. He returned to Vancouver in 1953 after graduating and married Shirley Hackman. The couple then moved to St. Louis, Missouri, where Barrett attended St Louis University and earned a master's degree in social work.

The couple and their two children (a third would be born in 1960) returned to British Columbia in 1957 where he found work at Haney Correctional Institute as a personnel and staff training officer. He was asked to run for the Co-operative Commonwealth Federation after giving a party member a tour of the facility.

== Political career ==
=== Election to the legislature ===
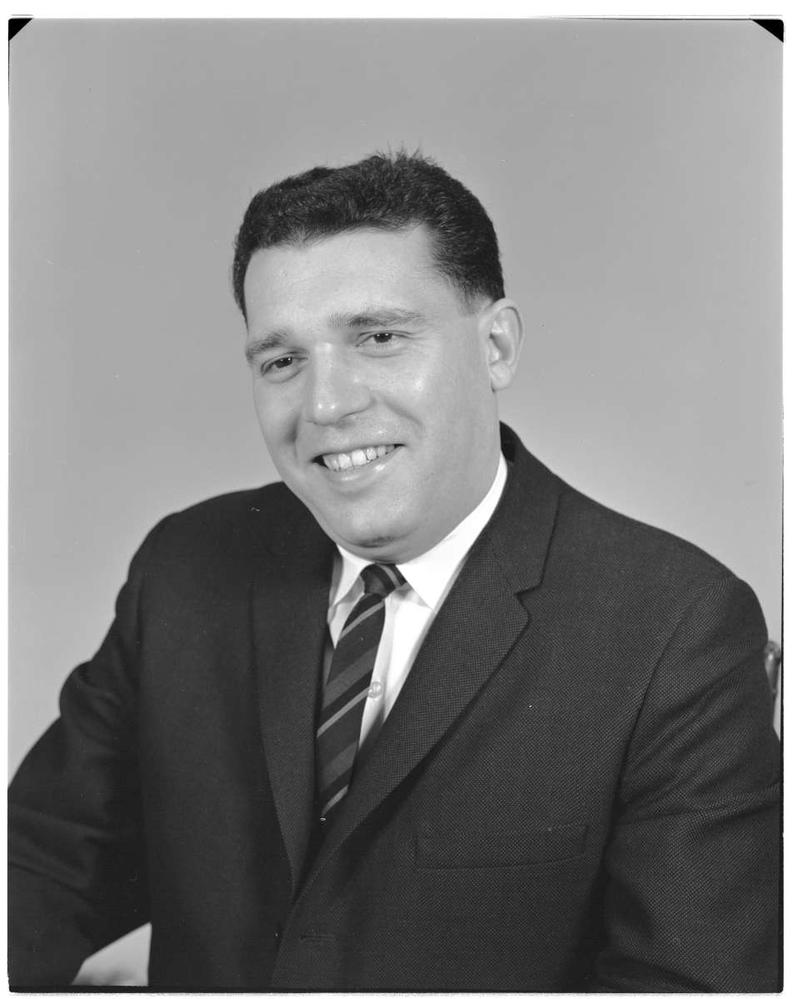
Barrett in 1964

Barrett was first elected to British Columbia's legislature in the 1960 election as a Co-operative Commonwealth Federation (soon to become the New Democratic Party of British Columbia) member for the electoral district of Dewdney. He had been fired from his job by the provincial government in 1959 after it became known that he was running for a CCF nomination and had to fight for reinstatement as at the time civil servants were barred from running for office.

He became known for his public speaking ability and held his seat through four elections. He ran for the provincial leadership of the NDP, but lost to Tom Berger. However, Berger lost the 1969 election, a contest that the NDP had been expected to win. He resigned, and there was a quick campaign to draft Barrett as party leader.

=== Premier ===
Barrett led the NDP to its first provincial victory against the stagnating Social Credit government of W. A. C. Bennett in the 1972 election. He became Premier on September 15, 1972.

The Barrett government substantially reformed the welfare system, initiated a number of reforms such as establishing the province's Labour Relations Board, the Insurance Corporation of British Columbia (ICBC) in order to provide public auto insurance and the Agricultural Land Reserve (ALR) to protect the small supply of farmland in BC, all of which were retained by subsequent Social Credit and Liberal governments. The NDP also introduced more democracy into the Legislative Assembly of British Columbia through the introduction of question period and full Hansard transcripts of legislative proceedings in the province.

In 1973, B.C. banned corporal punishment in all schools. It also banned pay toilets, launched Pharmacare, preserved Cypress Bowl for recreation, established the BC Ambulance Service, passed the Human Rights Code, consumer protection laws, and introduced French immersion in schools.

Several other reforms were introduced during Barrett's time as premier. A mineral royalties tax was introduced which inflamed the mining industry and helped mobilize it into organizing to defeat the NDP electorally. The Barrett government also created the provincial Crown Counsel prosecutorial service, centralizing prosecution control with the provincial Attorney General and removing it from local or municipal administration. The government also removed police stations from courthouses, emphasizing the separate functions of police and courts.

A provincial ambulance service and air ambulances were set up, while B.C. Day was proclaimed as a statutory holiday. Whistler was set up as Canada’s first “resort municipality, teacher-student ratios were reduced, and an expansion of community colleges took place. Human resources spending as a percentage of the budget was nearly doubled, and legislation, according to one study, “eliminated succession duties on farms transferring from parents to children.” A number of self-determination initiatives for First Nations were launched, and a provincial Status of Women office was set up while funding was provided for women’s shelters and health facilities, including agencies for rape victims. Collective bargaining rights were improved, while the minimum wage was increased to the highest level in Canada and was applied (as noted by one observer) “to women for the first time.” The conversion of agricultural land was frozen, safeguarding fertile soils while preventing these lands from being upzoned for profit.

Major investments were carried out in daycare and housing, welfare rates were raised, new rent protections for tenants were provided, and province-wide kindergarten was mandated. Homeowners benefited from school tax reductions, new housing investments, property tax relief, mortgage relief, and a $30-a-year renters’ grant. A housing ministry with a $75- million budget was set up, with $10-million for grants to non-profits building seniors’ housing and $50 million for “housing and development.” Also, as noted by one observer, “Housing was declared to be a basic right, with curbs on the powers of landlords and monthly grants to tenants.” British Columbia’s public housing stock also sharply increased during the course of Barrett’s premiership; from 1,400 to 6,200 units. Income assurance for farmers was carried out and government-financed dental care and summer jobs for young persons were introduced, together with Mincome; a minimum income program that guaranteed $250 a month to senior citizens and the disabled and which was described by one observer as “the Barrett government’s proudest welfare achievement.”

The NDP passed 367 bills, an average of a new law every three days, while in power.

=== Return to Opposition ===
Barrett called a snap election in 1975, and was defeated by the Social Credit Party, then led by Bill Bennett, son of the man Barrett had defeated in the previous election. Bennett's campaign focused on attacking the Barrett government's handling of provincial finances. Businesses and other free market supporters had united the opposition to the NDP under a revitalized Social Credit with both Liberal and Conservative (MLAs) crossing the floor to join the Socreds prior to the election.

In terms of raw numbers (but not percentage), the NDP increased its popular vote in the 1975 election. However, its vote outside of the Vancouver area plummeted, costing it 20 seats and its majority. Barrett was personally defeated in the Coquitlam seat he had held since its creation in a 1965 redistribution, losing to Socred challenger George Herman Kerster by only 18 votes. In June 1976, he was returned to the legislature in a by-election in Vancouver East, after sitting NDP MLA Robert Arthur Williams stepped aside. He remained an MLA for that riding until 1984, continuing to lead the NDP against Bennett's Socreds in the 1979 and 1983 elections.

On October 6, 1983, Barrett was forcibly removed from the Legislative Assembly chamber by the serjeant-at-arms, during a raucous debate on the Social Credit government's austerity program, for failing to abide by the Speaker's ruling and was banned from the legislature for several months. This was the first incident in the legislature's history where security staff had to intervene and remove a member from chamber.

=== Federal politics ===
Barrett was elected member of Parliament for the riding of Esquimalt—Juan de Fuca in 1988. He ran for the leadership of the federal New Democratic Party in 1989, losing narrowly on the fourth ballot to Audrey McLaughlin at the party's leadership convention. Rival candidate Simon De Jong agreed to support Barrett in exchange for being named Party Whip. De Jong forgot that he was wearing a microphone as part of a CBC documentary on the convention and the back-room discussions leaked to the press. The surrounding controversy hurt De Jong but was short-lived. During the campaign, Barrett argued that the party should be concerned with Western alienation, rather than focusing its attention on Quebec. The Quebec leadership of the NDP strongly opposed Barrett's candidacy, and future Quebec MP Phil Edmonston threatened to resign from the party if Barrett became leader.

During contentious attempts to amend Canada's constitution, Barrett opposed the 1987 Meech Lake Accord, but reluctantly endorsed the 1992 Charlottetown Accord to comply with party policy. He later referred to the party's support for the Accord as a mistake.

He lost his seat in the 1993 federal election to Reform Party candidate Keith Martin.

== Post-political life ==
OBC ribbon

From 1998 to 2000, Barrett chaired two inquiries into the Leaky condo crisis in BC entitled The Commission of Inquiry into the Quality of Condominium Construction in British Columbia. The first of what became known as the "Barrett Commissions" was to investigate the cause of the crisis and make recommendations to prevent reoccurrence. The second was to make recommendations following the collapse of the New Home Warranty program.

Barrett retired from active politics and, for health reasons beginning in 2010, from public life altogether. In 2000, Barrett was appointed to American Income Life Insurance Company's Labour Advisory Board as an honorary member. In 2003, he supported Bill Blaikie's bid to become leader of the federal NDP. In 2005, he was made an Officer of the Order of Canada, and in 2012 a member of the Order of British Columbia. In 2014, it was announced that Barrett had Alzheimer's disease and was living in a care facility in Victoria, British Columbia. He died on February 2, 2018, aged 87. A state memorial service was held for Barrett at the University of Victoria's Farquhar Auditorium on March 3, 2018. Premier John Horgan spoke to a crowd of about 1000 people.

== Legacy ==
The Surrey–Langley SkyTrain extension of the Expo Line is named after Barrett to recognise his government's contributions to establishing transit in the Langley region.
