= Howard McDiarmid =

Canadian physician (1927–2010)

Howard Richmond McDiarmid (June 3, 1927 – August 25, 2010) was a physician and political figure in British Columbia. He represented Alberni in the Legislative Assembly of British Columbia from 1966 to 1972 as a Social Credit member. He was defeated when he sought a third term in 1972 in the Oak Bay electoral district.

Born in Edmonton, Alberta in 1927, he grew up in the Canadian prairies and was educated in medicine at the University of Manitoba. McDiarmid interned at the Vancouver General Hospital and moved to Tofino in 1955. He was the only physician there until 1972, delivering more than 100 babies a year. McDiarmid married Lynn Honeyman, a nurse he had met in Banff while he was a student. In the 1970s, he helped establish Pacific Rim National Park Reserve. With his son Charles, he opened the Wickaninnish Inn in Tofino in August 1996. McDiarmid later practised in Vancouver and then California. He wrote Pacific Rim Park: a country doctor's role in preserving Long Beach and establishing the new Wickaninnish Inn (ISBN 0981320406), published in 2009. On August 25, 2010, McDiarmid died of cancer at Royal Jubilee Hospital in Victoria at the age of 83.
