= Frederick Morton Sharp =

Canadian politician

Fred Sharp

MLA for Vancouver East
- In office 1956–1960

Personal details
- Born: January 22, 1911 Vancouver, British Columbia
- Died: October 18, 2002 (aged 91) Vancouver, British Columbia
- Party: Social Credit
- Spouse: Marion

Frederick Morton Sharp (January 22, 1911 – October 18, 2002) was a Canadian politician. He served in the Legislative Assembly of British Columbia from 1956 to 1960 from the electoral district of Vancouver East, a member of the Social Credit Party.
