= Arthur James Turner (politician) =

Canadian politician (1888-1983)

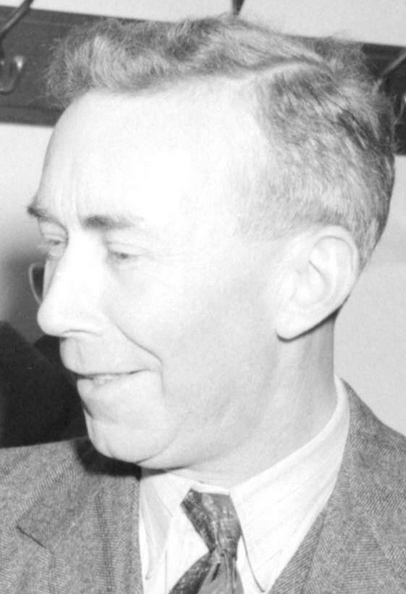

Arthur James Turner (September 12, 1888 – December 13, 1983) was an English-born body repair shop owner and political figure in British Columbia. He represented Vancouver East in the Legislative Assembly of British Columbia from 1941 to 1966 as a Co-operative Commonwealth Federation (CCF) and then New Democratic Party member.

He was born in Norwich, the son of Arthur Walter Turner and was educated there. He apprenticed as a coppersmith, and came to Canada in 1913 with his wife, the former Ida Emily White. He worked as a metal worker in Victoria before opening his own shop in Vancouver. He served as whip for the CCF and was deputy house leader for the party from 1957 to 1966. Turner died in Vancouver at the age of 95.
