= Arthur James Turner =

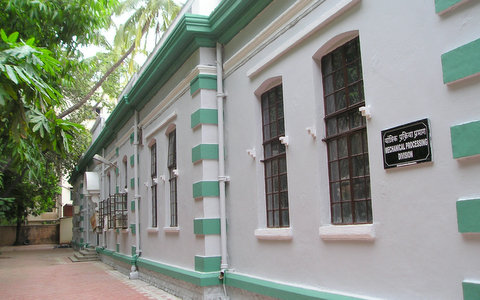
'The Spinning Division which was built in 1923 is still there'(2013)

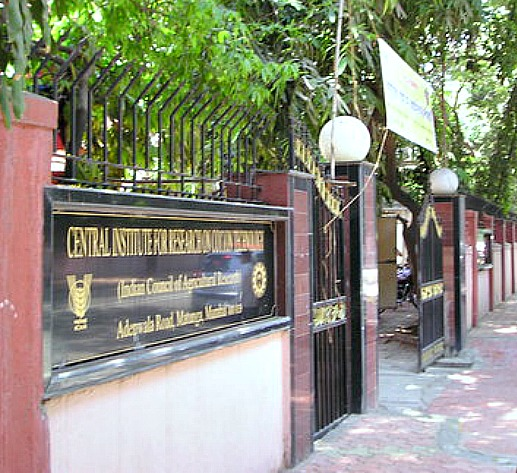
'The Main entrance of the Institute off Adenwala road'

Arthur James Turner, CBE, FTI (1889 – October 1971) was a British scientist who worked in the field of textile technology. He was the first director of the Technological Laboratory created by the Indian Central Cotton Committee (ICCC) in Bombay in 1924. He was awarded the Warner Memorial Medal by the Textile Institute in 1931 in recognition of outstanding work in textile science and technology and was appointed to the CBE in 1950.

== Education and career ==
Turner was a scholar of Gonville and Caius College, Cambridge, and of the University of London, where he obtained a first class bachelor's degree, whose first research was done under Sir William Pope. In 1912, he joined the staff of the National Physical Laboratory, London, to pursue research on aircraft and airship materials and was appointed Head of the Fabrics Research Section of the Royal Aircraft Factory. Immediately after World War I, the Manchester College of Technology offered him the newly established chair of textile technology, which he held until 1923.

== At ICCC, Bombay ==
Turner went to India, by the end of 1923, to become director of research for the Indian Central Cotton Committee (ICCC), to train the Indian staff members and to organise a comprehensive research programme at the newly started Technological Laboratory in Bombay (now the Central Institute for Research on Cotton Technology (CIRCOT)), which was opened by the then Viceroy and Governor-General of India, by Rufus Isaacs, the Earl of Reading, P.C; G.C.B; GMSI; GMIE; GCVO; on 3 December 1924. Turner worked on several new projects studying Indian cottons, including the American hirsutum cottons that were being tried by the officers of the East India Cotton Association. He streamlined the entire cotton research programmes, co-ordinated the scientists and the Bombay cotton mills, who were the ultimate users of the cotton crop. The best varieties of cotton once recognised, were to be exported to the United Kingdom. The Research papers entitled, "The Foundation of yarn strength", was culminated in many parts, is the best documented series of articles, compiled and edited by him. This work, has been published in The Journal of Textile Institute. He was responsible for many of the technological reports, that flowed from the laboratory and published in the Shirley Institute Memoirs by the Shirley Institute, Didsbury, Manchester. While he was in India, he was ably assisted by R. P. Richardson, the spinning master. After working for six years in India, he was appointed as the head of the Spinning Department at the Shirley Institute, Manchester, and as head of the British Cotton Industries Research Association BCIRA in 1931. He was offered the post of director of research at the Linen Industry Research Association, Lambeg, Lisburn, in Northern Ireland in 1940 and spent his last 16 years of service there, raising its profile to become accepted as the research centre of the whole linen industry and trade. He retired in March 1956, aged 67.

== Technological Laboratory ==
The Laboratory grew in leaps and bounds. After 1966 The Administration was taken over by ICAR, New Delhi, and the name of Laboratory was changed to Cotton Technological Research Laboratory, (CTRL) and further changed to 'The Central Institute for Research on Cotton Technology.' (CIRCOT) A 7 storeyed building was built to house a Library and various divisions.

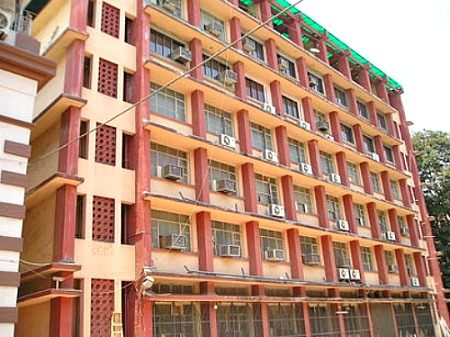
A seven storeyed Building

A well equipped Seminar hall, was added later in 2003.

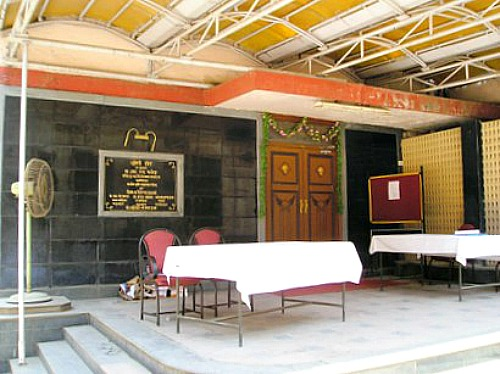
A State-of-the-art Auditorium

== Textile Institute ==
Turner was a member of the Textile Institute, Manchester, from 1919 and was awarded the Warner Memorial Medal by the Institute in 1931 in recognition of his contributions to textile science and technology. He was elected as a Fellow of the Textile Institute in 1940 and became president in 1952, a post that he held for two years. He served on numerous Government committees and was honoured with an honorary associateship of the Manchester College of Technology in 1951 and various offices of the Worshipful Company of Weavers. He was appointed CBE in 1950. Turner, died in October 1971 at the age of 82.

=== Service ===
- 1.Council of Textile Institute, for 1941–1948.
- 2.Vice-president, from 1949 to 1952.
- 3.Diplomas' Award Committee, for 24 years.
- 4.Journal Publication Committee, for 15 years.
- 5.UTMC, for 19 years.
- 6.At Northern Ireland, from 1940 to 1956.
- 7.In 1950 Awarded, CBE.
- 8.Visited Bombay Textile Research Association BTRA, as a consultant in 1958.

== Bibliography ==
- Tuner, A. J.; The Spinning value of cotton, Emp.Cotton Gr. Rev; 1. 107(1924)
- Turner, A. J; Explanatory note on the conduct of spinning tests in the Technological Laboratory and standard cotton test reports, Technol. Bull. A-1 (1925)
- Turner. A. J; The technological research Laboratory of the ICCC, Agric.Res.India, 20, Part II, 81, (1925)
- Turner, a. J. The Effect of temperature and humidity on cotton spinning with particular reference to conditions in Bombay, Technol, Bull. A-4 (1927)
- Turner, A. J.' the effect of subjecting cotton to repeated blow-room treatment, Technol. Bull. A-5 (1927)
- B-1- The Foundation of yarn strength and yarn extension
- Part I- The general Problem.
- Part II-The relation of yarn Strength to fibre strength.
- B-8- The Foundation of yarn strength and yarn extension : Part III-The clinging power of cotton.
- B-9-The Foundation of yarn strength and yarn-extension : Part IV- The influence of yarn twist on the diameters of cotton yarns land on the proportion of fibre-slippage and fibre-fracture in yarn-breakage.
- Gulati, A. N.; A. J. Turner (1928). A Note on the Early History of Cotton. Bombay: Indian Central Cotton Committee, Technological Laboratory. OCLC: 32976759.
- Turner, A. J. (1928). Technological Reports on Standard Indian Cottons. Bombay: Times Press. OCLC: 4357620.
- Turner, A. J.; D. L. Sen (1928). The use of hydrocyanic acid gas for the fumigation of American cotton... Calcutta: Government of India Central Publication Branch. OCLC: 25990477.
- Turner, A. J. (1929). Ginning percentage and lint index of cotton ... Bombay: Indian Central Cotton Committee, Technological Laboratory. OCLC: 53311463.
- Turner, A. J. (1928). The foundations of yarn-strength and yarn extension. Bombay: Indian Central Cotton Committee, Technological Laboratory. OCLC: 53311464 .
- Turner, A. J. (1954). Quality in Flax. Lisburn, Ire: Linen Research Institute. OCLC: 4341602.

== Sources ==
- 1. Journal of The Textile Institute (JTI), Manchester – Proceedings.
- 2. Sundaram, Dr. V. Fifty Years of Research.
