= British Columbia New Democratic Party =

Provincial political party in Canada

- Abbreviation: BC NDP
- Leader: Jennifer Whiteside (interim)
- President: Aman Singh
- Founded: 1933; 93 years ago (as BC CCF); 1961; 65 years ago (as BC NDP)
- Headquarters: 34 West 7th Avenue; Unit 320; Vancouver, British Columbia; V5Y 1L6
- Youth wing: British Columbia Young New Democrats
- Membership (2022): ~11,000
- Ideology: Social democracy
- Political position: Centre-left
- National affiliation: New Democratic Party
- Colours: Orange
- Seats in the Legislative Assembly: 27 / 93

Website
- www.bcndp.ca

The New Democratic Party of British Columbia (Note: The party's constitution defines its full name as the "New Democratic Party of British Columbia"; however, it is registered with Elections BC simply as the "BC NDP" and is usually referred to as such. The expanded form "British Columbia New Democratic Party" can also be found in use both internally and externally.) (BC NDP) is a social democratic political party in British Columbia, Canada. The party sits on the centre-left of the political spectrum and is formally affiliated with the federal New Democratic Party as its provincial branch in British Columbia. Since 2026, it has been the main rival to the governing Conservative Party of British Columbia and forms the Official Opposition in the Legislative Assembly of British Columbia.

The party was established in 1933 as the provincial wing of the Co-operative Commonwealth Federation; the party adopted the NDP name in 1961 as part of the national party's re-foundation. The CCF quickly established itself as a major party in British Columbia: for all but five years between 1933 and 1972, the CCF/NDP was the Official Opposition to the Liberal, Conservative and Social Credit governments. The NDP won its first election in 1972 under leader Dave Barrett, who governed until being defeated in the 1975 election.

The party returned to office in 1991 and governed until 2001 under a succession of leaders. The NDP lost the 2001 election in a landslide and remained in opposition until the 2017 election, when it formed a minority government under John Horgan. In the 2020 election, the party was re-elected with a majority government. In 2022, following health concerns, Horgan stepped down as party leader and premier and was succeeded by David Eby, who led the party to a slim majority victory in the 2024 election and to defeat in the 2026 election.

Seven leaders of the NDP have served as premier of British Columbia: Dave Barrett, Mike Harcourt, Glen Clark, Dan Miller, Ujjal Dosanjh, John Horgan and David Eby.

== History ==
=== Foundation and early history (1933–1951) ===
The party was formed in 1933, during the Great Depression, as the Co-operative Commonwealth Federation (British Columbia Section) — allied to the national CCF — by a coalition of the Socialist Party of Canada (SPC), the League for Social Reconstruction, and affiliated organizations. In August 1933, the latter two organizations merged to become the Associated CCF Clubs. The new party won seven seats in the 1933 provincial election, enough to form the official opposition. A further merger with the British Columbia SPC took place in 1935.

In 1936, the party split as its moderate leader, Reverend Robert Connell, was expelled over doctrinal differences in what was called the "Connell Affair". Three other CCF members of the Legislative Assembly (MLAs) in what had been a seven-member caucus quit and joined Connell in forming the Social Constructive Party, leaving only Harold Winch, Ernest Winch and Dorothy Steeves as CCF MLAs. The Constructivists nominated candidates in the 1937 election but failed to win a seat. The CCF regained their former contingent of seven MLAs but lost official opposition status to the reconstituted British Columbia Conservative Party.

Harold Winch succeeded Connell as CCF leader and guided the party until the 1950s.

The two-party system in Canada was challenged by the rise of the CCF and the Social Credit movement in western Canada during the Great Depression of the 1930s. The CCF first took power in 1944 in Saskatchewan under Premier Tommy Douglas. It also began to gain wider political support in British Columbia.

In order to block the rise of the CCF in BC, the provincial Liberal and Conservative parties formed a coalition government after the 1941 provincial election. That year neither party had enough seats to form a majority government on its own. For the ten years that the coalition held together, the CCF was the Official Opposition in the legislature.

=== Solidification as opposition party (1951–1972) ===
After the coalition fell apart in 1951, the government introduced the alternative vote electoral system, allowing voters to mark alternate preferences to allow the vote to be transferred if necessary. They expected that Conservative voters would list Liberal candidates among their alternates and vice versa. The government hoped to prevent the CCF from winning in a three-party competition, but they did not realize that a new fourth party was on the rise: the BC Social Credit League.

In the 1952 election, the Liberals and Conservatives were decimated, receiving 200,000 fewer votes than in the previous election. Social Credit League candidates received 100,000 more votes than in the previous election and also benefited from the vote transfers allowed in the new election system: many Liberal and Conservatives voters chose Social Credit candidates as their alternate choices. Social Credit emerged as the largest party in the Legislature, with one seat more than Winch's CCF. The Social Credit party chose a new leader, W. A. C. Bennett.

When Social Credit lost a motion of no confidence in the legislature in March 1953, Winch argued that the CCF should be allowed to try to form a government rather than the house being immediately dissolved for an election. Liberals, however, refused to support the CCF's bid to form a government, and an election was called.

In the 1953 election, Bennett won a majority government, and both the Liberal and the Conservative parties were reduced to fringe parties. Throughout the 1950s, Bennett's new electoral movement kept the CCF at bay. This period coincided with the height of the Cold War, and Bennett effectively used the scare tactic of the "Red Menace" against the CCF, referring to it as the "socialist hordes".

In 1960, the CCF joined with the Canadian Labour Congress nationally to create the New Party, which then in 1961 became the "New Democratic Party" (NDP). This reflected the formation of the national party from an alliance of the CCF and unions in the Canadian Labour Congress. Bennett kept the CCF and the NDP out of power throughout the 1960s, winning four general elections. Each time, Bennett used the "Red Menace" tactic as a wedge issue against the NDP and its leaders: Robert Strachan and, in the 1969 general election, Thomas Berger.

=== Barrett government (1972–1975) ===
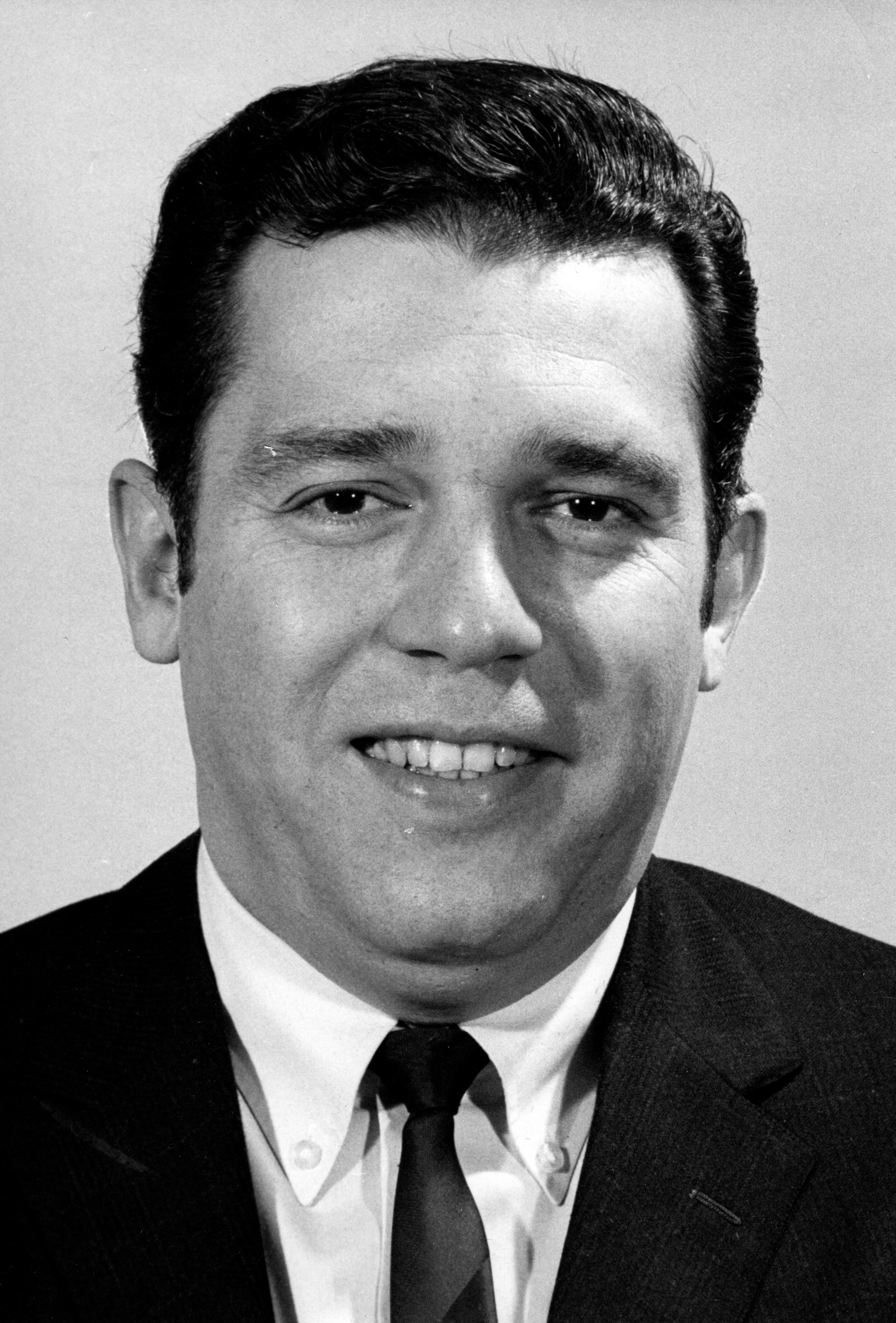
Dave Barrett, British Columbia's first NDP premier

The NDP first won election in 1972 under Dave Barrett, who served as premier for three years. The NDP passed a considerable amount of legislation in a short time, including establishing the Insurance Corporation of British Columbia and the Agricultural Land Reserve. A Question Period was added to the legislative process.

The NDP drove the small BC Liberal caucus to abandon their leader David Anderson for the Social Credit Party, as did one of the two Tories elected in 1972. The NDP introduced capital taxes and slashed funding to universities. It suffered for bringing clarity to the accounting by Social Credit, and revealing that British Columbia (BC) was significantly in debt.

In the 1975 election, the Social Credit party, under W. A. C. Bennett's son Bill Bennett, won a snap election called by Barrett. The Barrett government had initiated a number of reforms in the areas of labour relations, the public service, and social programs. Most of these endured until the restraint budget of 1983.

=== Return to opposition (1975–1991) ===
The NDP hit a then-high in popular support in the 1979 election with 46 percent of the vote. And after a minor decline in the party's vote share in 1983, Barrett retired as leader.

Riding high in the polls, the NDP appeared poised to win the 1986 election against the unpopular Social Credit government, but its new leader Bob Skelly stumbled in a verbal gaffe during the campaign, and the Socreds' new leader William Vander Zalm attracted votes with his charisma and telegenic performance. The party failed to score its anticipated breakthrough.

=== Harcourt government (1991–1996) ===
The New Democratic Party governed BC for nine and a half years, winning two back-to-back general elections in 1991 and 1996 before being defeated in 2001. Although the party's majority was reduced in 1996, it triumphed over the divided remnants of the Social Credit Party. In 1991, due in part to Social Credit's scandals under Premier William Vander Zalm and in part to the stellar performance of British Columbia Liberal Party (BC Liberals) leader Gordon Wilson in debate, the old Social Credit vote split between the BC Liberals, which garnered 33 percent of the vote, and the Social Credit Party with 25 percent. The NDP, under the leadership of former Vancouver mayor Mike Harcourt, won with 41 percent of the popular vote, which was one percentage point lower than the share the party had lost with in 1986.

Harcourt's first two years in government were characterized by a notably social democratic policy agenda, which included increases in welfare spending and rates. The voting age was lowered from 19 to 18 in 1992. In 1993, his government took a dramatic turn to the right with his televised address in which he lashed out against "welfare cheats, deadbeats and varmints". Broadcast province-wide, his speech inaugurated a set of welfare reforms enacted between 1993 and 1995; these were similar to those adopted by new Progressive Conservative provincial governments elected in Alberta and Ontario in the same time period.

The cutbacks were, in part, a reaction to a dramatic reduction in federal transfer payments by the federal Liberal government of Prime Minister Jean Chrétien. Parliament had repealed the Canada Assistance Plan bill of rights, which had included a right to food and a right to shelter. Unlike the reforms of the Harris and Klein governments in the other two provinces noted, the BC Benefits package of cutbacks and restrictions in social assistance eligibility was bundled with a childcare bonus paid to low- and medium-income families. The changes were unpopular with the province's anti-poverty movement and the BC Green Party; they were condemned by a motion at the NDP's 1997 convention.

Three months before BC Benefits was introduced by the Harcourt government, his government came into a protracted conflict with elements of the province's environmental movement. Harcourt's "Peace in the Woods" pact, which brought together traditionally warring environmental groups and forest workers' unions, began to collapse when Harcourt's cabinet exempted an environmentally sensitive area of Vancouver Island, Clayoquot Sound, from its province-wide mediation process for land-use conflicts, the Commission on Resources and the Environment (CORE). First Nations peoples led protests, including logging road blockades, which resulted in the arrests of more than 800 people. Some key environmental leaders, such as David Suzuki and Colleen McCrory, became alienated from the NDP and shifted their support to the Green Party in the 1996 provincial election.

Although low in the polls for much of his term in office, Harcourt and his newly appointed attorney general, Ujjal Dosanjh, succeeded in regaining substantial public support by taking a hard line against an aboriginal group's occupation of a farmer's field in the Cariboo region of the province. In what became known as the Gustafsen Lake standoff, Dosanjh led the largest-scale police operation in British Columbia history as the government tried to regain control. The Royal Canadian Mounted Police (RCMP) used armoured vehicles provided by the Canadian military for protection. The military strongly rejected attempts by the RCMP to have them take over control of the situation, and ultimately it remained a police operation. The RCMP used anti-vehicle mines and shot thousands of rounds of ammunition at protesters.

With less than 72 hours before a planned election call, and with the NDP high in the polls for its hard line against welfare recipients and aboriginal and environmental radicals, the party's provincial office was raided by RCMP officers as part of an ongoing investigation of illegal use of charity bingo money by former provincial cabinet minister and MP Dave Stupich (for which Stupich was later convicted on two counts). Media called the scandal "Bingogate". Although Harcourt was not implicated in either the raid or the probe, he resigned; he was later fully exonerated. The NDP was led into the 1996 provincial general election by Glen Clark.

=== Clark government (1996–1999) ===
Clark entered the 1996 election far back in the polls but proved an excellent campaigner. For the duration of the election, he re-unified the party's traditional coalition, using the slogan "On Your Side". He effectively portrayed the Liberals' new leader, former Vancouver mayor Gordon Campbell, as a pawn of big business and a dangerous right-wing extremist. Clark, for example, pointed to Campbell's promise to privatize BC Rail as an example of Campbell's pro big business policies. Clark was aided by Jack Weisgerber, leader of the BC Reform Party (the name taken by the majority of the Social Credit caucus), and Wilson, by then leader of the Progressive Democratic Alliance (PDA). Although the NDP won only 39 percent of the vote to Campbell's 42 percent, it secured 39 seats to Campbell's 33. This was partially explained by the vote splitting of the centre-right electorate following the collapse of the Social Credit party, with 9.29% and 5.74% of the popular vote going to the right wing Reform party and centrist Progressive Democrat parties respectively. This is possible because BC uses a first past the post electoral system.

Following the campaign, Clark's government struggled to exert leadership; the premier's scrappy style began to further alienate parts of the NDP coalition outside the core group of labour activists who helped to run Clark's campaign. Shortly after the election, it was discovered that the 1995–96 and 1996–97 fiscal years did not have the balanced budgets on which Clark had campaigned but small deficits of approximately $100 million. This became a political scandal following a report by the BC Auditor General, which stated that the finance minister acted in a way "inconsistent with the principle of responsible and prudent fiscal planning" when drawing up the projected revenue numbers.

During these years, the NDP began to lose support and activists to the BC Greens, who reached 5 percent in the polls in the fourth quarter of 1997 and 11 percent by the fall of 1998. But most voters who left the NDP ultimately shifted to the Liberals, which was evident from the polling leading up to the 2001 BC election.

New scandals surfaced. Clark allegedly used his influence to win a casino licence for a neighbour, Dimitrios Pilarinos, who had helped him with some home renovations. Construction of the PacifiCat BC Ferries suffered cost over-runs and poor technical decisions. The new ferries were intended to speed transportation between Vancouver and Nanaimo but became part of the fast ferry scandal, ultimately costing the province $454 million when the government sold them for scrap. Technical issues with the ferries included their inability to operate at all if wave heights exceeded 2.5 metres (8 ft 2 in) and their reduced motor vehicle carrying capacity compared to traditional ferries.

By mid-1999, an obvious rift had appeared in the administration as Attorney General Dosanjh and Finance Minister Joy MacPhail challenged Clark's legitimacy. The party and province endured a few chaotic months of government with frequent cabinet shuffles following a police raid on Clark's home before he stepped down as premier. In 2002, Clark was acquitted of all charges in the Pilarinos case. Pilarinos himself was convicted on six charges and acquitted on three charges.

Dan Miller, the longest-serving member of the legislature, stepped in as premier and interim party leader during an acrimonious leadership race between Dosanjh, maverick West Kootenay MLA Corky Evans, and Wilson (who had been persuaded to fold his Progressive Democratic Alliance party into the NDP and join Glen Clark's cabinet in 1999). Despite clear favouritism from Clark, Wilson dropped out of the race less than one hour before the delegates voted due to a lack of support, throwing his support behind Evans. The final vote tally was 769 votes for Dosanjh and 549 votes for Evans, hence Dosanjh became party leader and the next premier.

=== Dosanjh government (2000–2001) ===
Having bottomed out at 15 percent in the polls, the Dosanjh government attempted to capitalize on the new premier's high personal approval rating with their remaining year in power. The government made a number of concessions to the party's anti-poverty and environmental wings in an attempt to reforge the coalition but the party would not budge in the polls.

Dosanjh waited as long as possible to call the next election, finally doing so in April 2001. By this time, the party had risen to 21 percent in opinion polling – a slight improvement from the nadir of a year earlier. Nonetheless, it became obvious that the NDP would not be re-elected. Midway through the campaign, Dosanjh conceded defeat in a pre-recorded message and asked the electorate to give the NDP a chance as a strong opposition party. De facto leadership passed to MacPhail, who managed to reinvigorate the campaign. The NDP's popular vote dropped to 22 percent, while its seat count dropped to only two – MacPhail and neighbouring Vancouver-Mount Pleasant MLA Jenny Kwan. They were also the only surviving members of the previous Cabinet; even Dosanjh lost his seat. All 77 other seats were captured by the Liberals who won 58 percent of the vote. It was the second-worst defeat of a sitting provincial government in Canada. Despite the severe defeat, MacPhail was credited for saving the party from being completely wiped off the electoral map. Shortly after the election, Dosanjh resigned as leader and MacPhail was appointed interim leader.

=== Opposition and recovery (2001–2017) ===
MacPhail and Kwan were initially not granted official party status by Campbell on the grounds that the legislature's rules stipulated a party must hold four seats. However, the Speaker of the Assembly, former Social Credit cabinet minister-turned BC Liberal Claude Richmond, recognized MacPhail as leader of the Opposition. Ultimately, Richmond's position gradually won out, and he was able to ensure that the remains of the NDP were provided the resources of an official party.

Given the high level of support within the party for her leadership, MacPhail surprised many by choosing not to seek the full-time leadership in 2003. The low-key leadership campaign was contested by establishment favourite and former Victoria School Board chair Carole James, Oak Bay City Councillor Nils Jensen, former MLAs Leonard Krog and Steve Orcherton, and a few minor candidates. First ballot results had James first followed by Jensen, Krog, and Orcherton. James won on the second ballot.

In late 2004, the party won an upset election victory in the constituency of Surrey-Panorama Ridge. Jagrup Brar became the third member of the party's caucus, winning a riding that had supported the NDP in 1991 before falling to the Liberals in 1996. Brar beat a locally popular BC Liberal candidate and Adriane Carr, the BC Green Party's leader, winning an absolute majority of the vote.

In the 2005 provincial election, James came closer to forming a government than even the NDP had predicted, winning 33 seats to Campbell's 45 and receiving a vote share 5 percent higher in suburban Vancouver than any pollster had predicted. The NDP also exceeded 40 percent of the vote for the first time since 1991.

In 2008, the NDP won two key by-elections in Vancouver-Fairview and Vancouver-Burrard.

In the 2009 provincial election, the NDP came a close second to the Liberals, with 42 percent of the popular vote and the Liberals receiving 45 percent. 35 New Democrats and 49 Liberals were elected. Despite the popular vote, only 3,500 votes separated the party from forming government.

The NDP under Adrian Dix was widely expected to win the May 2013 provincial election as the NDP enjoyed a 20-point lead in the polls prior to the election campaign. However, the Liberals gained four seats, while the NDP lost two, in an election that returned the Liberal government under Premier Christy Clark. In September 2013, Dix announced his intention to resign as party leader once a leadership election was held.

Following Dix's resignation, John Horgan, MLA for Langford-Juan de Fuca, was acclaimed as party leader in the 2014 party leadership election and subsequently became the leader of the Opposition in the Legislative Assembly of British Columbia.

=== Horgan and Eby governments (2017–2026) ===
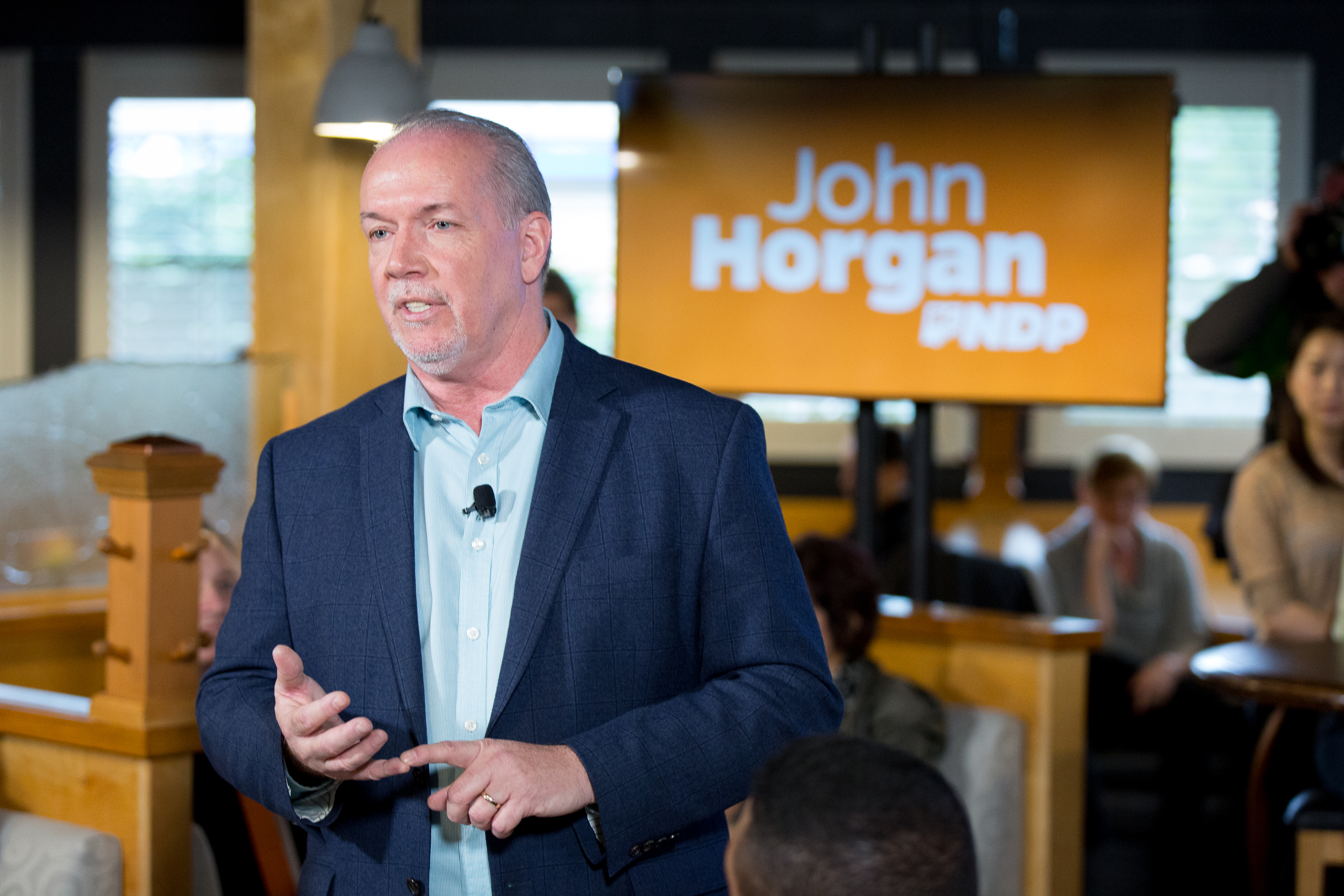
Horgan campaigning in 2017

In the lead-up to the May 2017 provincial election, the NDP under Horgan occasionally led the Liberals in polls. The May 9 election returned 43 Liberal MLAs, 41 NDP MLAs and a record 3 Green MLAs. This was one of the closest elections in BC's history, exemplified by the popular vote breakdown: 40.36% for the Liberals, 40.28% for the NDP, and 16.84% for the Greens. The Liberals won the popular vote by a razor-thin margin of just 1,566 votes province-wide. Following the election, which resulted in a hung parliament, the Greens entered into negotiations with both the Liberals and NDP to decide which party they should support in the minority parliament. On May 29, Horgan and Green leader Andrew Weaver announced that the Greens would support an NDP minority government in a confidence and supply agreement. This meant the Greens are obliged to vote with the NDP in matters of confidence – keeping the government from falling – but were allowed to vote freely on legislation brought forward by the NDP government. On June 29, the minority Liberal government of Premier Christy Clark was defeated 44–42 by the NDP-Green alliance in a confidence vote, leading Lieutenant Governor Judith Guichon to ask Horgan to form a government. On July 18, Horgan was sworn in as British Columbia's 36th premier, and first NDP premier in 16 years. The NDP formed a minority government, the first time the NDP has had such a government in provincial history.

On September 21, 2020, after only three years in government, Horgan called a snap election. The election call drew criticism, as it violated the agreement with the Green Party, and came during the first year of the COVID-19 pandemic; journalists noted that Horgan and the NDP had been doing well in the polls at the time. In the 2020 election, the NDP won a majority government, securing a record 57 seats and receiving 47.7% of the overall popular vote — both record highs for the party.

After five years as premier, Horgan announced in June 2022 that he would step down as party leader and as premier once a new leader had been chosen. The election for his successor was scheduled for the fourth quarter of 2022. David Eby was acclaimed as Horgan's successor on October 21, 2022, after the disqualification of the only other candidate, Anjali Appadurai, from the leadership contest. The general election on October 19, 2024, had a narrow result. All but 3 NDP cabinet ministers were re-elected. Shortly after the election, a confidence and supply agreement with the BC Greens was announced to ensure stability despite the narrow majority. In February 2026, the BC Greens decided not to renew the agreement.

Eby called a snap election in September 2026 amid instability within the opposition Conservative Party, which had experienced leadership changes and divisions among its MLAs and stood in the election with interim leader Lorne Doerkson at the helm. Eby led the party to defeat in the election, marking the end of a 9-year BC NDP government and a return to official opposition status; he announced his intention to resign as party leader on election night.

== Party leaders ==
"†" denotes acting or interim leader.

=== Co-operative Commonwealth Federation (CCF) ===
#	Party leader	Tenure	Notes
1	Robert Connell	1933–1936	In 1936, Connell was expelled and three other MLAs resigned from the CCF. They formed the Social Constructive Party.
2	Harold Edward Winch	1937–1953	
3	Arnold Webster	1953–1956	
4	Robert Strachan	1956–1961	

=== New Democratic Party (NDP) ===
#	Party leader	Portrait	Tenure	Notes
1	Robert Strachan		1961–1969	
2	Thomas R. Berger		1969–1970	
3	Dave Barrett		1970–1984	26th premier of British Columbia, 1972–1975
4	Bob Skelly		1984–1987	
5	Mike Harcourt		1987–1996	30th premier of British Columbia, 1991–1996
6	Glen Clark		1996–1999	31st premier of British Columbia, 1996–1999
†	Dan Miller		1999–2000	32nd premier of British Columbia, 1999–2000
7	Ujjal Dosanjh		2000–2001	33rd premier of British Columbia, 2000–2001
†	Joy MacPhail		2001–2003	Interim leader
8	Carole James		2003–2011	
†	Dawn Black		2011	Interim leader
9	Adrian Dix		2011–2014	
10	John Horgan		2014–2022	36th premier of British Columbia, 2017–2022
11	David Eby		2022–2026	37th premier of British Columbia, 2022–2026
†	Jennifer Whiteside		2026–present	Interim leader

=== Presidents ===
The party president is the administrative chairperson of the party, chairing party conventions, councils and executive meetings.

- Thomas R. Berger (1961–1962)
- Fred Vulliamy (1962–1963)
- Jack Mackenzie (1963–1965)
- Frank Snowsell (1965–1966)
- Ray Haynes (1966)
- Norman Levi (1966–1968)
- John Laxton (1968–1970)
- Dave Stupich (1970–1972)
- Frank Murphy (1972–1975)
- Yvonne Cocke (1975–1977)
- John Brewin (1977–1978)
- Gerry Stoney (1978–1985)
- Joy Langan (1985–1988)
- Elaine Bernard (1988–1989)
- Ian Aikenhead (1989–1992)
- Patrice Pratt (1992–1996)
- Bruce Ralston (1996–2001)
- Maura Parte (2001–2003)
- Jeff Fox (2003–2009)
- Sav Dhaliwal (2009)
- Moe Sihota (2009–2013)
- Craig Keating (2013–2021)
- Aaron Sumexheltza (2021–2025)
- Aman Singh (2025–present)

== Election results ==
Results shown are for CCF from 1933 to 1960, NDP since 1963.

=== Legislative Assembly ===
Election	Leader	Seats	+/−	Place	Votes	Vote share (%)	Change (pp)	Legislative role	Notes
1933	Robert Connell	7 / 47 (15%)	n/a	2nd	120,185	31.53	n/a	Opposition	Liberal majority
1937	vacant	7 / 48 (15%)	Steady	▼3rd	119,400	28.57	▼2.96	Third party	Liberal majority
1941	Harold Winch	14 / 48 (29%)	▲7	▲2nd	151,440	33.36	▲4.79	Opposition	Liberal minority
1941	Harold Winch	14 / 48 (29%)	▲7	▲2nd	151,440	33.36	▲4.79	Opposition	Liberal–Conservative coalition
1945	Harold Winch	10 / 48 (21%)	▼4	2nd	175,960	37.62	▲4.26	Opposition	Liberal–Conservative coalition
1949	Harold Winch	7 / 48 (15%)	▼3	2nd	245,284	35.10	▼2.52	Opposition	Liberal–Conservative coalition
1952	Harold Winch	18 / 48 (38%)	▲11	2nd	236,562 (Note: Election was held under instant-runoff voting; the final popular vote count was 231,756.)	30.78 (Note: Election was held under instant-runoff voting; the final popular vote percent was 34.3%.)	▼4.32	Opposition	Social Credit minority
1953	Arnold Webster	14 / 48 (29%)	▼4	2nd	224,513 (Note: Election was held under instant-runoff voting; the final popular vote count was 194,414.)	30.85 (Note: Election was held under instant-runoff voting; the final popular vote percent was 29.48%.)	▲0.07	Opposition	Social Credit majority
1956	Robert Strachan	10 / 52 (19%)	▼4	▼2nd	231,511	28.32	▼2.53	Opposition	Social Credit majority
1960	Robert Strachan	16 / 52 (31%)	▲6	2nd	326,094	32.73	▲4.41	Opposition	Social Credit majority
1963	Robert Strachan	14 / 52 (27%)	▼2	▲2nd	269,004	27.80	▼4.93	Opposition	Social Credit majority
1966	Robert Strachan	16 / 55 (29%)	▲2	2nd	252,753	33.62	▲5.82	Opposition	Social Credit majority
1969	Thomas Berger	12 / 55 (22%)	▼4	2nd	331,813	33.92	▲0.30	Opposition	Social Credit majority
1972	Dave Barrett	38 / 55 (69%)	▲26	▲1st	448,260	39.59	▲5.67	Majority	
1975	Dave Barrett	18 / 55 (33%)	▼20	▼2nd	505,396	39.16	▼0.43	Opposition	Social Credit majority
1979	Dave Barrett	26 / 57 (46%)	▲8	2nd	646,188	45.99	▲6.83	Opposition	Social Credit majority
1983	Dave Barrett	22 / 57 (39%)	▼4	2nd	741,354	44.94	▼1.05	Opposition	Social Credit majority
1986	Robert Skelly	22 / 69 (32%)	Steady	2nd	824,544	42.60	▼2.34	Opposition	Social Credit majority
1991	Mike Harcourt	51 / 75 (68%)	▲19	▲1st	595,391	40.71	▼1.89	Majority	
1996	Glen Clark	39 / 75 (52%)	▼12	1st	624,395	39.45	▼1.26	Majority	
2001	Ujjal Dosanjh	2 / 79 (3%)	▼37	▼2nd	343,156	21.56	▼17.89	No status (Note: The NDP did not win the required 4 seats to receive official party status, and were not recognized as an official party by premier Gordon Campbell. However, speaker Claude Richmond later decided to recognize the NDP caucus as the official opposition as they were the only other party represented in the Legislative Assembly. As a result, the NDP received the resources and funding of an official party.)	Liberal majority
2001	Ujjal Dosanjh	2 / 79 (3%)	▼37	▼2nd	343,156	21.56	▼17.89	Opposition	Liberal majority
2005	Carole James	33 / 79 (42%)	▲31	2nd	694,978	41.43	▲19.87	Opposition	Liberal majority
2009	Carole James	35 / 85 (41%)	▲2	2nd	691,342	42.14	▲0.71	Opposition	Liberal majority
2013	Adrian Dix	34 / 85 (40%)	▼1	2nd	715,999	39.71	▼2.43	Opposition	Liberal majority
2017	John Horgan	41 / 87 (47%)	▲7	2nd	795,527	40.28	▲0.57	Opposition	Liberal minority
2017	John Horgan	41 / 87 (47%)	▲7	2nd	795,527	40.28	▲0.57	Minority	Green Party confidence and supply
2020	John Horgan	57 / 87 (66%)	▲16	▲1st	899,365	47.70	▲7.42	Majority	
2024	David Eby	47 / 93 (51%)	▼10	1st	943,915	44.87	▼2.82	Majority	Green Party confidence and supply (2024–2026)
2026	David Eby	27 / 93 (29%)	▼20	▼2nd	708,263	37.35	▼7.52	Opposition	Conservative majority

== See also ==
- List of articles about British Columbia CCF/NDP members
- British Columbia New Democratic Party leadership conventions
- List of premiers of British Columbia
- List of British Columbia general elections
- List of political parties in British Columbia
