= Vander Zalm ministry =

Cabinet of British Columbia, 1986–1991

- 28th ministry of British Columbia
- Date formed: August 6, 1986
- Date dissolved: April 2, 1991

People and organisations
- Monarch: Elizabeth II
- Lieutenant Governor: Robert Gordon Rogers (1986–1988); David Lam (1988–1991)
- Premier: Bill Vander Zalm
- Deputy Premier: Grace McCarthy (1986); Vacant (1986–1990); Rita Johnston (1990–1991)
- Member party: Social Credit
- Status in legislature: Majority
- Opposition party: New Democratic Party
- Opposition leader: Robert Skelly (1986–1987); Mike Harcourt (1987–1991)

History
- Election: 1986
- Legislature terms: 33rd Parliament of British Columbia; 34th Parliament of British Columbia
- Predecessor: Bill Bennett ministry
- Successor: Johnston ministry

The Vander Zalm ministry was the combined Cabinet (formally the Executive Council of British Columbia) that governed British Columbia from August 6, 1986, to April 2, 1991. It was led by Bill Vander Zalm, the 28th premier of British Columbia, and consisted of members of the Social Credit Party.

The Vander Zalm ministry was established part-way through the 33rd Parliament of British Columbia, after Premier Bill Bennett stepped down and Vander Zalm was elected as his successor. Following the 1986 election, it continued to govern through the 34th Parliament of British Columbia, until Vander Zalm stepped down in 1991. It was succeeded by the Johnston ministry.

== List of ministers ==
Vander Zalm ministry by portfolio
Portfolio	Minister	Tenure	
Portfolio	Minister	Start	End
Premier of British Columbia	Bill Vander Zalm	August 6, 1986	April 2, 1991
Deputy Premier of British Columbia	Vacant	August 6, 1986	August 14, 1986
Deputy Premier of British Columbia	Grace McCarthy	August 14, 1986	November 6, 1986
Deputy Premier of British Columbia	Vacant	November 6, 1986	August 10, 1990
Deputy Premier of British Columbia	Rita Johnston	August 10, 1990	April 2, 1991
Minister of Advanced Education, Training and Technology (Note: "Post-Secondary Education" from August 6, 1986 to November 6, 1986; "Continuing Education and Job Training" from November 6, 1986 to December 10, 1986; "Advanced Education and Job Training" from December 10, 1986 to November 1, 1989)	Russell Fraser	August 6, 1986	November 6, 1986
Minister of Advanced Education, Training and Technology	Stan Hagen	November 6, 1986	July 29, 1987
Minister of Advanced Education, Training and Technology	Brian Smith (acting)	July 29, 1987	August 6, 1987
Minister of Advanced Education, Training and Technology	Stan Hagen	August 6, 1987	November 1, 1989
Minister of Advanced Education, Training and Technology	Bruce Strachan	November 1, 1989	April 2, 1991
Minister of Agriculture and Fisheries (Note: "Agriculture and Food" from August 7, 1986 to August 14, 1986)	Jim Hewitt	August 7, 1986	November 6, 1986
Minister of Agriculture and Fisheries	John Savage	November 6, 1986	December 13, 1990
Minister of Agriculture and Fisheries	Harry de Jong	December 13, 1990	April 2, 1991
Attorney General	Brian Smith	August 6, 1986	June 29, 1988
Attorney General	Elwood Veitch (acting)	June 29, 1988	August 6, 1988
Attorney General	Bud Smith	August 6, 1988	July 13, 1990
Attorney General	Russell Fraser	July 13, 1990	April 2, 1991
Minister of Consumer and Corporate Affairs	Elwood Veitch	August 6, 1986	November 6, 1986
Minister of Crown Lands (Note: "Minister responsible for Crown Lands" from July 6, 1988 to November 1, 1989)	Howard Dirks	July 6, 1988	November 1, 1989
Minister of Crown Lands	Dave Parker	November 1, 1989	April 2, 1991
Minister of Economic Development	Grace McCarthy	August 14, 1986	July 5, 1988
Minister of Education	Jim Hewitt	August 6, 1986	August 14, 1986
Minister of Education	Anthony Brummet	August 14, 1986	December 13, 1990
Minister of Education	Stan Hagen	December 13, 1990	April 2, 1991
Minister of Energy, Mines and Petroleum Resources	Anthony Brummet	August 6, 1986	August 14, 1986
Minister of Energy, Mines and Petroleum Resources	Jack Davis	August 14, 1986	March 28, 1991
Minister of Environment (Note: "Environment and Parks" from August 14, 1986 to July 6, 1988; "Minister responsible for Environment" from July 6, 1988 to November 1, 1988)	Austin Pelton	August 6, 1986	November 6, 1986
Minister of Environment	Stephen Rogers	November 6, 1986	March 3, 1987
Minister of Environment	Bruce Strachan	March 3, 1987	November 1, 1989
Minister of Environment	John Reynolds	November 1, 1989	December 13, 1990
Minister of Environment	Cliff Serwa	December 13, 1990	April 2, 1991
Minister of Finance and Corporate Relations (Note: "Finance" from August 6, 1986 to November 6, 1986)	Hugh Curtis	August 6, 1986	August 14, 1986
Minister of Finance and Corporate Relations	Bill Vander Zalm	August 14, 1986	November 6, 1986
Minister of Finance and Corporate Relations	Mel Couvelier	November 6, 1986	March 7, 1991
Minister of Finance and Corporate Relations	Elwood Veitch	March 7, 1991	April 2, 1991
Minister of Forests (Note: "Forests and Lands" from August 14, 1986 to July 6, 1988)	Jack Heinrich	August 6, 1986	August 11, 1986
Minister of Forests	Jack Kempf	August 14, 1986	March 6, 1987
Minister of Forests	John Savage (acting)	March 6, 1987	March 31, 1987
Minister of Forests	Dave Parker	March 31, 1987	November 1, 1989
Minister of Forests	Claude Richmond	November 1, 1989	April 2, 1991
Minister of Government Management Services (Note: "Provincial Secretary and Government Services" from August 6, 1986 to July 6, 1988)	Grace McCarthy	August 6, 1986	August 14, 1986
Minister of Government Management Services	Hugh Curtis	August 14, 1986	November 6, 1986
Minister of Government Management Services	Elwood Veitch	November 6, 1986	July 6, 1988
Minister of Government Management Services	Cliff Michael	July 6, 1988	November 1, 1989
Minister of Government Management Services	Carol Gran	November 1, 1989	April 2, 1991
Minister of Health	Jim Nielsen	August 6, 1986	November 6, 1986
Minister of Health	Peter Dueck	November 6, 1986	November 1, 1989
Minister of Health	John Jansen	November 1, 1989	April 2, 1991
Minister of Human Resources	Jim Nielsen	August 6, 1986	August 14, 1986
Minister of Industry and Small Business Development	Robert McClelland	August 6, 1986	August 13, 1986
Minister of Intergovernmental Relations	Garde Gardom	August 6, 1986	November 6, 1986
Minister of Intergovernmental Relations	Bruce Strachan	November 6, 1986	March 3, 1987
Minister of Intergovernmental Relations	Stephen Rogers	March 3, 1987	November 13, 1987
Minister of International Business and Immigration	John Jansen	July 6, 1988	November 1, 1989
Minister of International Business and Immigration	Elwood Veitch	November 1, 1989	April 2, 1991
Minister of International Trade, Science and Investment	Pat McGeer	August 6, 1986	November 6, 1986
Minister of Labour and Consumer Services (Note: "Labour" from August 6, 1986 to November 6, 1986)	Terry Segarty	August 6, 1986	November 6, 1986
Minister of Labour and Consumer Services	Lyall Hanson	November 6, 1986	November 1, 1989
Minister of Labour and Consumer Services	Norman Jacobsen	November 1, 1989	December 13, 1990
Minister of Labour and Consumer Services	James Rabbitt	December 13, 1990	April 2, 1991
Minister of Lands, Parks and Housing	Jack Kempf	August 6, 1986	August 14, 1986
Minister of Municipal Affairs, Recreation and Culture (Note: "Municipal Affairs" from August 7, 1986 to August 11, 1986; "Municipal Affairs and Transit" from August 14, 1986 to November 6, 1986)	Jack Heinrich	August 7, 1986	August 11, 1986
Minister of Municipal Affairs, Recreation and Culture	Rita Johnston	August 14, 1986	November 1, 1989
Minister of Municipal Affairs, Recreation and Culture	Lyall Hanson	November 1, 1989	April 2, 1991
Minister of Native Affairs (Note: "Minister responsible for Native Affairs" from July 6, 1988 to November 1, 1989)	Jack Weisgerber	July 6, 1988	April 2, 1991
Minister of Parks (Note: "Minister responsible for Parks" from July 6, 1988 to November 1, 1989)	Terry Huberts	July 6, 1988	November 1, 1989
Minister of Parks	Ivan Messmer	November 1, 1989	December 13, 1990
Minister of Parks	John Savage	December 13, 1990	April 2, 1991
Provincial Secretary (Note: Held concurrently with Government Management services from August 6, 1986 to July 6, 1988; held concurrently with Tourism from July 6, 1988 to November 1, 1989)	Grace McCarthy	August 6, 1986	August 14, 1986
Provincial Secretary	Hugh Curtis	August 14, 1986	November 6, 1986
Provincial Secretary	Elwood Veitch	November 6, 1986	July 6, 1988
Provincial Secretary	Bill Reid	July 6, 1988	September 22, 1989
Provincial Secretary	Claude Richmond	September 22, 1989	November 1, 1989
Provincial Secretary	Howard Dirks	November 1, 1989	April 2, 1991
Minister of Regional and Economic Development (Note: "Regional Development" from July 6, 1988 to November 1, 1989)	Elwood Veitch	July 6, 1988	November 1, 1989
Minister of Regional and Economic Development	Stan Hagen	November 1, 1989	December 13, 1990
Minister of Regional and Economic Development	Bud Smith	December 13, 1990	April 2, 1991
Minister responsible for Science and Technology	Stan Hagen	July 6, 1988	November 1, 1989
Minister responsible for Seniors	Peter Dueck	July 6, 1988	November 1, 1989
Minister responsible for Seniors	John Jansen	November 1, 1989	April 2, 1991
Minister of Social Services and Housing	Claude Richmond	August 14, 1986	November 1, 1989
Minister of Social Services and Housing	Peter Dueck	November 1, 1989	June 4, 1990
Minister of Social Services and Housing	Norman Jacobsen	June 4, 1990	April 2, 1991
Solicitor General	Angus Ree	July 6, 1988	November 1, 1989
Solicitor General	Russell Fraser	November 1, 1989	December 13, 1990
Solicitor General	Ivan Messmer	December 13, 1990	April 2, 1991
Minister of Tourism (Note: "Tourism, Recreation and Culture" from November 6, 1986 to July 6, 1988; "Tourism and Provincial Secretary" from July 6, 1988 to November 1, 1989)	Claude Richmond	August 6, 1986	August 14, 1986
Minister of Tourism	Bill Reid	August 14, 1986	September 22, 1989
Minister of Tourism	Claude Richmond	September 22, 1989	November 1, 1989
Minister of Tourism	Cliff Michael	November 1, 1989	April 2, 1991
Minister of Transportation and Highways	Alex Fraser	August 6, 1986	November 6, 1986
Minister of Transportation and Highways	Cliff Michael	November 6, 1986	November 13, 1987
Minister of Transportation and Highways	Stephen Rogers	November 13, 1987	July 6, 1988
Minister of Transportation and Highways	Neil Vant	July 6, 1988	November 1, 1989
Minister of Transportation and Highways	Rita Johnston	November 1, 1989	April 2, 1991
Minister responsible for Women's Programs	Carol Gran	November 1, 1989	April 2, 1991

=== Ministers of state ===
Ministers of state in the Vander Zalm ministry
Portfolio	Minister	Tenure	
Portfolio	Minister	Start	End
Minister of State, Cariboo	Bruce Strachan	October 22, 1987	November 1, 1989
Minister of State, Kootenay	Rita Johnston	October 22, 1987	July 6, 1988
Minister of State, Mainland/Southwest	Elwood Veitch	October 22, 1987	November 1, 1989
Minister of State, Nechako	Stephen Rogers	October 22, 1987	July 6, 1988
Minister of State, Nechako and Northeast	Jack Weisgerber	July 6, 1988	November 1, 1989
Minister of State, North Coast	Dave Parker	October 22, 1987	July 6, 1988
Minister of State, Northeast	Anthony Brummet	February 1988	July 6, 1988
Minister of State, Okanagan	Claude Richmond	October 22, 1987	July 6, 1988
Minister of State, Peace River	Anthony Brummet	October 22, 1987	February 1988
Minister of State, Thompson–Okanagan and Kootenays	Howard Dirks	July 6, 1988	November 1, 1989
Minister of State, Vancouver Island/Coast	Stan Hagen	October 22, 1987	July 6, 1988
Minister of State, Vancouver Island/Coast and North Coast	Terry Huberts	July 6, 1988	November 1, 1989

== Cabinet composition and shuffles ==
Vander Zalm was sworn into office on August 6, 1986, inheriting Bennett's cabinet; he said he would assemble a new cabinet to be sworn in the next week. During this time, two cabinet ministers resigned their posts: Jack Heinrich and Robert McClelland.

On August 14, Vander Zalm unveiled his new cabinet. Only three ministers were named to replace the four departed ones, with the Ministry of Lands, Parks and Housing dissolved and its responsibilities split to accommodate the reduced cabinet size. Vander Zalm said his reduced cabinet should be taken "as a clear sign of less government … I expect that over a period of time, a reduction in the size of government will continue where appropriate." The three ministers joining cabinet were Jack Davis as minister of energy, mines and petroleum resources; Rita Johnston as minister of municipal affairs; and Bill Reid as minister of tourism. Notably, the three were also the only Socred MLAs to support Vander Zalm's leadership bid from the beginning. Grace McCarthy, third-place finisher in the 1986 party leadership election, moved from provincial secretary to economic development, and was additionally made deputy premier; Claude Richmond moved to social services and housing; Jack Kempf took over forests and lands; Anthony Brummet was named to education; and Jim Hewitt was appointed to agriculture and fisheries. Vander Zalm himself took the finance portfolio, to provide a "hands on" approach to financial and economic development, but added that he only intended to hold the role "as long as it takes." Meanwhile, Brian Smith (runner-up in the 1986 leadership election), Pat McGeer, Russ Fraser, Alex Fraser, Garde Gardom, Terry Segarty and Elwood Veitch all retained their existing portfolios.

Following the government's re-election in the 1986 election, Vander Zalm initiated a major shuffle on November 6. Two more ministries — the Ministry of International Trade, Science and Investment; and the Ministry of Consumer and Corporate affairs — were dissolved, with their responsibilities being incorporated into other ministries; almost every ministry's responsibilities were reorganized to accommodate this. Seven new members were added to cabinet, including five who were newly elected: Mel Couvelier, John Savage, Peter Dueck, Stan Hagen and Lyall Hanson. Vander Zalm said that the number of newly elected ministers would be an advantage, as they would bring an "open-minded approach" to their ministries and to cabinet. Couvelier was appointed minister of finance. McCarthy lost her title of deputy premier, which was eliminated, but gained responsibility for international trade. Notably absent were Bud Smith, Kim Campbell and John Reynolds, all unsuccessful leadership candidates; however, Stephen Rogers, another leadership candidate, joined cabinet as minister of environment and parks. The new cabinet consisted of 17 ministers.

Throughout 1987, the Vander Zalm ministry saw several ministers resign due to allegations of conflicts-of-interest. On March 3, Rogers offered his resignation as environment minister; Vander Zalm accepted his resignation, but moved him to a new portfolio instead of dropping him from cabinet. Rogers was named to intergovernmental affairs, replacing Bruce Strachan, who in turn took over Rogers' old portfolio. Days later, on March 7, Kempf resigned as forests minister as Vander Zalm announced an internal investigation into "financial irregularities" in the ministry; Savage took over as acting minister until March 31, when Dave Parker was named the new minister. On July 24, Stan Hagen announced his resignation as minister of advanced education in response to a conflict-of-interest investigation; Brian Smith took over on an interim basis. Hagen was reinstated as minister on August 6, after the report found he was violated guidelines but not the B.C. Constitution Act. On November 13, Cliff Michael resigned as transport minister after admitting to a "perceived conflict of interest"; he was replaced by Rogers.

In September 1987, Vander Zalm announced a plan to decentralize provincial government with the creation of eight regional districts to administer various government services. Vander Zalm also said that each region would be represented by a "minister of state" in the cabinet, who would have responsibility for co-ordinating economic development and government services in said region.

In mid-1988, the ministry was rocked by two high-profile resignations. On June 28, attorney general Brian Smith resigned from cabinet. Smith said his resignation was because Vander Zalm did not adequately respect the independence of his office, citing two instances of meddling, and that Vander Zalm was planning to split the ministry into two. Elwood Veitch became acting attorney general. One week later, on July 6, Grace McCarthy resigned from cabinet, also in protest of Vander Zalm's leadership and the interference of "arrogant" civil servants in the premier's office.

Amidst the two resignations, Vander Zalm announced a major shuffle and restructuring of his government on July 6. Three new ministries were created: the Ministry of Regional Development, the Ministry of International Business and Immigration, and Solicitor General. Regional development and international business split the responsibilities of the eliminated Economic Development portfolio, while solicitor general assumed the responsibility for policing and corrections from the attorney general's office. Eight backbenchers were promoted to cabinet: Howard Dirks (crown lands), Terry Huberts (parks), John Jansen (international business), Cliff Michael (government management services, returning to cabinet), Angus Ree (solcitor general), Bud Smith (attorney general), Neil Vant (transportation) and Jack Weisgerber (native affairs); one minister, Stephen Rogers, was dropped from cabinet. Ultimately, the ministry expanded to 22 members. It was, to that point, the largest cabinet in BC history.

On September 21, 1989, Bill Reid resigned from cabinet after allegations of embezzlement; he was replaced as tourism minister by Claude Richmond.

On November 1, 1989, Vander Zalm announced another major shuffle that he called a "cabinet for the '90s". Three ministers — Huberts, Ree and Vant — were dropped, and five were added: Carol Gran (government management services and women's programs), Russ Fraser (solicitor general, returning to cabinet), Norm Jacobsen (labour and consumer services), Ivan Messmer (parks) and John Reynolds (environment). Of the 17 ministers who remained in cabinet, eleven changed responsibilities while six stayed put: Brummet (education), Couvelier (finance), Davis (energy), Savage (agriculture), Smith (attorney general) and Weisgerber (native affairs). Notably, Vander Zalm scrapped all the ministers of state titles, citing concerns about cabinet ministers being involved in regional matters; instead, Hagen took lead on the regionalization program as minister of regional development. After the shuffle, the cabinet stood at 22 ministers.

The ministry faced two more resignations through 1990. On May 30, Dueck resigned from cabinet amidst a growing expenses scandal in his ministry; Jacobsen temporarily took over as social services minister. On July 12, Bud Smith stepped down from cabinet, under fire for allegedly meddling in a private prosecution. Solicitor general Russ Fraser stepped in as acting attorney general, becoming the first non-lawyer to hold the role in decades.

On December 13, 1990, Vander Zalm shuffled his cabinet once more. Calling back to his last shuffle, he called the new lineup "a cabinet for the 21st century." Most notably, Bud Smith returned to cabinet as minister for regional and economic development. Fraser continued as attorney general, with Messmer taking his role as solicitor general. Jacobsen was named to social services and housing, to fill the gap left by Dueck's resignation. Three new members joined: Harry de Jong (agriculture), Jim Rabbitt (labour and consumer services) and Cliff Serwa (environment). Only one member was dropped from cabinet: Anthony Brummet, who had previously announced he would not be running for re-election. After the shuffle, the cabinet counted 23 members. The Times Colonist noted that this was Zalm's fifth major cabinet shuffle, and that 32 ministers had gone through cabinet since the 1986 election.

On March 6, 1991, Mel Couvelier quit cabinet in protest, saying he "couldn't sit beside" Vander Zalm while the latter was under investigation for conflict-of-interest. He was replaced as finance minister by Elwood Veitch.

On March 28, 1991, Jack Davis, minister of energy, mines and petroleum resources, died in office.
