= 34th Parliament of British Columbia =

The 34th Legislative Assembly of British Columbia sat from 1987 to 1991. The members were elected in the British Columbia general election held in October 1986. The Social Credit Party led by Bill Vander Zalm formed the government. Vander Zalm resigned in 1991 after he was found to have put himself into a conflict of interest; Rita Johnston then became Premier. The New Democratic Party (NDP) led by Bob Skelly formed the official opposition.

John Douglas Reynolds served as speaker for the assembly until 1989. Stephen Rogers succeeded Reynolds as speaker.

== Members of the 34th Parliament ==
The following members were elected to the assembly in 1986:

Member	Electoral district	Party	First elected / previously elected	No.# of term(s)
Robert Evans Skelly	Alberni	NDP	1972	5th term
Gerard A. Janssen (1988)	Alberni	NDP	1988	1st term
Larry Guno	Atlin	NDP	1986	1st term
James J. (Jim) Hewitt	Boundary-Similkameen	Social Credit	1975	4th term
Ivan Charles Messmer	Boundary-Similkameen	Social Credit	1986	1st term
Bill Barlee (1988)	Boundary-Similkameen	NDP	1988	1st term
David Maurice Mercier	Burnaby-Edmonds	Social Credit	1986	1st term
David Maurice Mercier	Burnaby-Edmonds	Independent Social Credit	1986	1st term
David Maurice Mercier	Burnaby-Edmonds	Social Credit	1986	1st term
James Barry Jones	Burnaby North	NDP	1986	1st term
Elwood Neal Veitch	Burnaby-Willingdon	Social Credit	1975, 1983	3rd term*
Alexander Vaughan Fraser	Cariboo	Social Credit	1969	6th term
T. Neil Vant	Cariboo	Social Credit	1986	1st term
David Zirnhelt (1989)	Cariboo	NDP	1989	1st term
Harry H. De Jong	Central Fraser Valley	Social Credit	1986	1st term
Peter Albert Dueck	Central Fraser Valley	Social Credit	1986	1st term
John Jansen	Chilliwack	Social Credit	1986	1st term
Duane Delton Crandall	Columbia River	Social Credit	1986	1st term
Duane Delton Crandall	Columbia River	Independent Social Credit	1986	1st term
Duane Delton Crandall	Columbia River	Social Credit	1986	1st term
Stanley Brian Hagen	Comox	Social Credit	1986	1st term
Mark Willson Rose	Coquitlam-Moody	NDP	1983	2nd term
Graham Preston Bruce	Cowichan-Malahat	Social Credit	1986	1st term
Graham Preston Bruce	Cowichan-Malahat	Independent Social Credit	1986	1st term
Graham Preston Bruce	Cowichan-Malahat	Social Credit	1986	1st term
Kenneth Walter Davidson	Delta	Social Credit	1975	4th term
John Lawrence Savage	Delta	Social Credit	1986	1st term
Johann Alvin Norman Jacobsen	Dewdney	Social Credit	1983	2nd term
Forbes Charles Austin Pelton	Dewdney	Social Credit	1986	1st term
Munmohan Singh (Moe) Sihota	Esquimalt-Port Renfrew	NDP	1986	1st term
Claude Harry Richmond	Kamloops	Social Credit	1981	3rd term
Stuart Douglas Boland (Bud) Smith	Kamloops	Social Credit	1986	1st term
Kathleen Anne Edwards	Kootenay	NDP	1986	1st term
Caroline Mary (Carol) Gran	Langley	Social Credit	1986	1st term
Daniel George Peterson	Langley	Social Credit	1986	1st term
Harold Long	Mackenzie	Social Credit	1986	1st term
John Massey Cashore	Maillardville-Coquitlam	NDP	1986	1st term
Laurence Dale Lovick	Nanaimo	NDP	1986	1st term
David Daniel Stupich	Nanaimo	NDP	1963, 1972	7th term*
Jan Pullinger (1989)	Nanaimo	NDP	1989	1st term
Howard Leroy Dirks	Nelson-Creston	Social Credit	1986	1st term
Anita Mae Joan Hagen	New Westminster	NDP	1986	1st term
Colin Stuart Gabelmann	North Island	NDP	1972, (Note: North Vancouver-Seymour) 1979	4th term*
Anthony Julius (Tony) Brummet	North Peace River	Social Credit	1979	3rd term
Angus Creelman Ree	North Vancouver-Capilano	Social Credit	1979	3rd term
John (Jack) Davis	North Vancouver-Seymour	Social Credit	1975	4th term
Brian Ray Douglas Smith	Oak Bay-Gordon Head	Social Credit	1979	3rd term
Elizabeth Cull (1989)	Oak Bay-Gordon Head	NDP	1989	1st term
Lyall Franklin Hanson	Okanagan North	Social Credit	1986	1st term
Larry Chalmers	Okanagan South	Social Credit	1986	1st term
Clifford Jack Serwa	Okanagan South	Social Credit	1986	1st term
Jack Joseph Kempf	Omineca	Social Credit	1975	4th term
Jack Joseph Kempf	Omineca	Independent	1975	4th term
Jack Joseph Kempf	Omineca	Social Credit	1975	4th term
Lois Ruth Boone	Prince George North	NDP	1986	1st term
William Bruce Strachan	Prince George South	Social Credit	1979	3rd term
Arthur Daniel Miller	Prince Rupert	NDP	1986	1st term
Nick Loenen	Richmond	Social Credit	1986	1st term
William Nick (Bill) Vander Zalm	Richmond	Social Credit	1975, (Note: Surrey) 1986	3rd term*
Christopher D'Arcy	Rossland-Trail	NDP	1972	5th term
Mel Couvelier	Saanich and the Islands	Social Credit	1986	1st term
Terry Huberts	Saanich and the Islands	Social Credit	1986	1st term
Clifford C. Michael	Shuswap-Revelstoke	Social Credit	1983	2nd term
David Fletcher Hewlett Parker	Skeena	Social Credit	1986	1st term
John Sylverster (Jack) Weisgerber	South Peace River	Social Credit	1986	1st term
Joan Kathleen Smallwood	Surrey-Guildford-Whalley	NDP	1986	1st term
Rita Margaret Johnston	Surrey-Newton	Social Credit	1983	2nd term
William Earl (Bill) Reid	Surrey-White Rock-Cloverdale	Social Credit	1983	2nd term
Emery Oakland Barnes	Vancouver Centre	NDP	1972	5th term
Michael Franklin Harcourt	Vancouver Centre	NDP	1986	1st term
Glen David Clark	Vancouver East	NDP	1986	1st term
Robert Arthur Williams	Vancouver East	NDP	1966, 1984	6th term*
Grace Mary McCarthy	Vancouver-Little Mountain	Social Credit	1966, 1975	6th term*
Douglas Lyle Mowat	Vancouver-Little Mountain	Social Credit	1983	2nd term
Douglas Lyle Mowat	Vancouver-Little Mountain	Independent Social Credit	1983	2nd term
Douglas Lyle Mowat	Vancouver-Little Mountain	Social Credit	1983	2nd term
Avril Kim Campbell	Vancouver-Point Grey	Social Credit	1986	1st term
Darlene R. Marzari	Vancouver-Point Grey	NDP	1986	1st term
Tom Perry (1989)	Vancouver-Point Grey	NDP	1989	1st term
Russell Gordon Fraser	Vancouver South	Social Credit	1983	2nd term
Charles Stephen Rogers	Vancouver South	Social Credit	1975	4th term
Robin Kyle Blencoe	Victoria	NDP	1983	2nd term
Gordon William Hanson	Victoria	NDP	1979	3rd term
John Douglas Reynolds	West Vancouver-Howe Sound	Social Credit	1983	2nd term
James Thomas Rabbitt	Yale-Lillooet	Social Credit	1986	1st term

== Party standings ==
Affiliation	Members
Social Credit	47
New Democratic	22
Total	69
Government Majority	25

== By-elections ==
By-elections were held to replace members for various reasons:

Electoral district	Member elected	Party	Election date	Reason
Boundary-Similkameen	Bill Barlee	New Democratic Party	June 8, 1988	James J. Hewitt resigned December 10, 1987
Alberni	Gerard A. Janssen	New Democratic Party	November 19, 1988	Robert E. Skelly resigned May 10, 1988
Nanaimo	Jan Pullinger	New Democratic Party	March 15, 1989	David D. Stuphich resigned October 13, 1988
Vancouver-Point Grey	Tom Perry	New Democratic Party	March 15, 1989	Kim Campbell resigned October 27, 1988
Cariboo	David Zirnhelt	New Democratic Party	September 20, 1989	Alexander V. Fraser died May 11, 1989
Oak Bay-Gordon Head	Elizabeth Cull	New Democratic Party	December 13, 1989	Brian Smith resigned November 15, 1989

== Other changes ==
- Jack Joseph Kempf left the Social Credit caucus and became an independent on March 30, 1987. He rejoined on June 25, 1990.
- On October 3, 1989 Graham Bruce, Duane Delton Crandall, David Maurice Mercier, and Doug Mowat resigned from the Social Credit caucus to become Independent Social Credit. Crandall rejoined the Social Credit caucus on January 24, 1990. Bruce, Mercier and Mowat rejoined on February 14.
- Jack Davis, MLA for North Vancouver-Seymour, died on March 27, 1991.
- Robert Arthur Williams, MLA for Vancouver East, resigned his seat on May 7, 1991.
- Anthony Brummet, MLA for North Peace River resigned his seat on June 8, 1991.
