= Johnston ministry =

Cabinet of British Columbia in 1991

- 29th ministry of British Columbia
- Date formed: April 2, 1991
- Date dissolved: November 5, 1991

People and organisations
- Monarch: Elizabeth II
- Lieutenant Governor: David Lam
- Premier: Rita Johnston
- Member party: Social Credit
- Status in legislature: Majority
- Opposition party: New Democratic Party
- Opposition leader: Mike Harcourt

History
- Legislature term: 34th Parliament of British Columbia
- Predecessor: Vander Zalm ministry
- Successor: Harcourt ministry

The Johnston ministry was the combined Cabinet (formally the Executive Council of British Columbia) that governed British Columbia from April 2, 1991, to November 5, 1991. It was led by Rita Johnston, the 29th premier of British Columbia, and consisted of members of the Social Credit Party.

The Johnston ministry was in office for the last seven months of the 34th Parliament of British Columbia. Johnston was Deputy Premier of British Columbia in the preceding Vander Zalm ministry; following Bill Vander Zalm's resignation, the Social Credit caucus selected her to be the interim leader (and thus premier) while the party could organize a leadership convention. Johnston successfully stood for the permanent leadership. She was the first woman to serve as a first minister in Canada.

Following the 1991 election, which the Social Credit Party lost, the ministry was replaced by the Harcourt ministry.

== List of ministers ==
Johnston ministry by portfolio
Portfolio	Minister	Tenure	
Portfolio	Minister	Start	End
Premier of British Columbia	Rita Johnston	April 2, 1991	November 5, 1991
Minister of Advanced Education, Training and Technology	Bruce Strachan	April 2, 1991	May 7, 1991
Minister of Advanced Education, Training and Technology	Stan Hagen	May 7, 1991	May 29, 1991
Minister of Advanced Education, Training and Technology	Peter Albert Dueck	May 29, 1991	November 5, 1991
Minister of Agriculture, Fisheries and Food	Harry de Jong	April 2, 1991	April 15, 1991
Minister of Agriculture, Fisheries and Food	Larry Chalmers	April 15, 1991	November 5, 1991
Attorney General	Russell Fraser	April 2, 1991	November 5, 1991
Minister of Crown Lands	Dave Parker	April 2, 1991	April 15, 1991
Minister of Development, Trade and Tourism	Howard Dirks	April 15, 1991	November 5, 1991
Minister of Education	Stan Hagen	April 2, 1991	November 5, 1991
Minister of Energy, Mines and Petroleum Resources	Jack Weisgerber	April 2, 1991	November 5, 1991
Minister of Environment	Clifford Serwa	April 2, 1991	April 15, 1991
Minister of Environment	David Mercier	April 15, 1991	November 5, 1991
Minister responsible for Families	Carol Gran	April 15, 1991	November 5, 1991
Minister of Finance and Corporate Relations	Elwood Veitch	April 2, 1991	April 8, 1991
Minister of Finance and Corporate Relations	Mel Couvelier	April 8, 1991	May 7, 1991
Minister of Finance and Corporate Relations	John Jansen	May 7, 1991	November 5, 1991
Minister of Forests	Claude Richmond	April 2, 1991	November 5, 1991
Minister of Government Management Services	Carol Gran	April 2, 1991	April 15, 1991
Minister of Health	John Jansen	April 2, 1991	May 7, 1991
Minister of Health	Bruce Strachan	May 7, 1991	November 5, 1991
Minister of International Business and Immigration	Elwood Veitch	April 2, 1991	April 15, 1991
Minister of Labour and Consumer Services	James Rabbitt	April 2, 1991	November 5, 1991
Minister of Lands and Parks	Dave Parker	April 15, 1991	November 5, 1991
Minister responsible for Multiculturalism and Immigration	Elwood Veitch	April 15, 1991	November 5, 1991
Minister of Municipal Affairs, Recreation and Culture	Lyall Hanson	April 2, 1991	April 15, 1991
Minister of Municipal Affairs, Recreation and Culture	Graham Bruce	April 15, 1991	November 5, 1991
Minister of Native Affairs	Jack Weisgerber	April 2, 1991	April 15, 1991
Minister of Native Affairs	John Savage	April 15, 1991	November 5, 1991
Minister of Parks	John Savage	April 2, 1991	April 15, 1991
Provincial Secretary	Howard Dirks	April 2, 1991	April 15, 1991
Provincial Secretary	Elwood Veitch	April 15, 1991	November 5, 1991
Minister of Regional and Economic Development	Bud Smith	April 2, 1991	April 15, 1991
Minister responsible for Seniors	John Jansen	April 2, 1991	May 7, 1991
Minister responsible for Seniors	Bruce Strachan	May 7, 1991	November 5, 1991
Minister of Social Services and Housing	Norman Jacobsen	April 2, 1991	November 5, 1991
Solicitor General	Ivan Messmer	April 2, 1991	November 5, 1991
Minister of Tourism	Cliff Michael	April 2, 1991	April 15, 1991
Minister of Transportation and Highways	Rita Johnston	April 2, 1991	April 15, 1991
Minister of Transportation and Highways	Lyall Hanson	April 15, 1991	November 5, 1991
Minister of Women's Programs and Government Services (Note: "Minister responsible for Women's Programs" from April 2, 1991 to April 15, 1991)	Carol Gran	April 2, 1991	November 5, 1991

== Cabinet shuffles ==
On April 8, Johnston reappointed Mel Couvelier as finance minister. Couvelier had previously been finance minister under Vander Zalm, but had resigned on March 6 as a protest against Vander Zalm's conflict-of-interest investigation. Elwood Veitch, who had taken over the finance ministry after Couvelier's resignation, remained in cabinet as minister of international business and immigration.

Johnston shuffled her cabinet on April 15. Three new members joined: Graham Bruce, Larry Chalmers and David Mercier. Notably, Bruce and Mercier were two of the four MLAs who had quit the party caucus in 1989 in protest of Vander Zalm's leadership. Meanwhile, four ministers left cabinet: Harry de Jong, Cliff Michael, Cliff Serwa and Bud Smith. Several portfolios were reconfigured or merged to accommodate the slightly smaller cabinet. The new Ministry of Lands and Parks was created by joining the Ministry of Parks and Ministry of Crown Lands; the tourism and international business portfolios were combined as the new Ministry of Development, Trade and Tourism; and the remaining immigration portfolio was expanded to include multiculturalism.

On May 7, Johnston fired Couvelier from cabinet for allegedly breaching the confidentiality provisions of the Financial Institutions Act. Couvelier's departure caused a mini-shuffle: John Jansen was named the new finance minister, Bruce Strachan moved into Jansen's old role as health minister, and Stan Hagen took over Strachan's old portfolio of advanced education (while remaining education minister).

On May 29, Peter Albert Dueck was appointed Minister of Advanced Education. Dueck had previously been in Vander Zalm's cabinet until being forced to resign in May 1990 over an expenses scandal; after an RCMP investigation cleared him of any wrongdoing, Johnston invited him back to cabinet.
