= Bill Bennett ministry =

Cabinet of British Columbia, 1975–1986

- 27th ministry of British Columbia
- Date formed: December 22, 1975
- Date dissolved: August 6, 1986

People and organisations
- Monarch: Elizabeth II
- Lieutenant Governor: Walter Stewart Owen (1975-1978); Henry Pybus Bell-Irving (1978–1983); Robert Gordon Rogers (1983–1986)
- Premier: Bill Bennett
- Deputy Premier: Grace McCarthy (1975-1983)
- Member party: Social Credit
- Status in legislature: Majority
- Opposition party: New Democratic Party
- Opposition leader: Dave Barrett (1976–1984); Robert Skelly (1984–1986)

History
- Elections: 1975, 1979, 1983
- Legislature terms: 31st Parliament of British Columbia; 32nd Parliament of British Columbia; 33rd Parliament of British Columbia
- Predecessor: Barrett ministry
- Successor: Vander Zalm ministry

The Bill Bennett ministry was the combined Cabinet (formally the Executive Council of British Columbia) that governed British Columbia from December 22, 1975, to August 6, 1986. It was led by Bill Bennett, the 27th premier of British Columbia, and consisted of members of the Social Credit Party.

The Bill Bennett ministry was established after the 1975 British Columbia general election, when Premier Dave Barrett was defeated in the general election and Bill Bennett was elected as his successor. Following the 1979 election and 1983 election, it continued to govern through the 34th Parliament of British Columbia, until Bennett retired as premier in 1986. It was succeeded by the Vander Zalm ministry.

== List of ministers ==
Bill Bennett ministry by portfolio
Portfolio	Minister	Tenure	
Portfolio	Minister	Start	End
Premier of British Columbia	Bill Bennett	December 22, 1975	August 6, 1986
Deputy Premier of British Columbia	Grace McCarthy	December 22, 1975	May 26, 1983
Deputy Premier of British Columbia	Vacant	May 26, 1983	August 6, 1986
Minister of Agriculture and Food (Note: "Agriculture" from December 22, 1975, to August 22, 1980)	Donald M. Phillips	December 22, 1975	October 29, 1976
Minister of Agriculture and Food	Jim Hewitt	October 29, 1976	December 5, 1978
Minister of Agriculture and Food	Cyril Morley Shelford	December 5, 1978	June 5, 1979
Minister of Agriculture and Food	Jim Hewitt	June 5, 1979	August 10, 1982
Minister of Agriculture and Food	Harvey Schroeder	August 10, 1982	February 11, 1986
Minister of Agriculture and Food	Thomas Waterland	February 11, 1986	August 6, 1986
Attorney General	Garde Gardom	December 22, 1975	November 23, 1979
Attorney General	Allan Williams	November 23, 1979	May 26, 1983
Attorney General	Brian Smith	May 26, 1983	August 6, 1986
Minister of Consumer and Corporate Affairs (Note: "Consumer Services" from December 22, 1975, to October 29, 1976)	Rafe Mair	December 22, 1975	December 5, 1978
Minister of Consumer and Corporate Affairs	Jim Nielsen	December 5, 1978	January 6, 1981
Minister of Consumer and Corporate Affairs	Peter Hyndman	January 6, 1981	August 10, 1982
Minister of Consumer and Corporate Affairs	Jim Hewitt	August 10, 1982	February 11, 1986
Minister of Consumer and Corporate Affairs	Elwood Veitch	February 11, 1986	August 6, 1986
Minister of Deregulation	Sam Bawlf	December 5, 1978	June 5, 1979
Minister of Deregulation	Evan Wolfe	June 5, 1979	November 24, 1979
Minister of Economic Development	Donald Phillips	December 22, 1975	November 24, 1979
Minister of Education	Pat McGeer	December 22, 1975	December 5, 1978
Minister of Education	Brian Smith	November 24, 1979	August 10, 1982
Minister of Education	Bill Vander Zalm	August 10, 1982	May 26, 1983
Minister of Education	Jack Heinrich	May 26, 1983	February 11, 1986
Minister of Education	Jim Hewitt	February 11, 1986	August 6, 1986
Minister of Education, Science and Technology	Pat McGeer	December 5, 1978	November 24, 1979
Minister of Energy, Mines and Petroleum Resources	Jim Hewitt	December 5, 1978	November 24, 1979
Minister of Energy, Mines and Petroleum Resources	Bob McClelland	November 24, 1979	August 10, 1982
Minister of Energy, Mines and Petroleum Resources	Brian Smith	August 10, 1982	May 26, 1983
Minister of Energy, Mines and Petroleum Resources	Stephen Rogers	May 26, 1983	February 11, 1986
Minister of Energy, Mines and Petroleum Resources	Anthony Brummet	February 11, 1986	August 6, 1986
Minister of Energy, Transport and Communications	Jack Davis	October 29, 1976	April 3, 1978
Minister of Energy, Transport and Communications	Bill Bennett	April 3, 1978	December 5, 1978
Minister of Environment	Jim Nielsen	December 22, 1975	December 5, 1978
Minister of Environment	Rafe Mair	December 5, 1978	November 24, 1979
Minister of Environment	Stephen Rogers	November 24, 1979	May 26, 1983
Minister of Environment	Anthony Brummet	May 26, 1983	February 27, 1985
Minister of Environment	Austin Pelton	February 27, 1985	August 6, 1986
Minister of Finance	Evan Wolfe	December 22, 1975	November 24, 1979
Minister of Finance	Hugh Curtis	November 24, 1979	August 6, 1986
Minister of Forests	Thomas Waterland	December 22, 1975	January 17, 1986
Minister of Forests	(Donald M. Phillips) (Note: Phillips was given the powers and duties of the Minister of Forests by an order in council following Waterland's resignation but was not actually designated as Minister or Acting Minister of Forests.)	January 17, 1986	February 11, 1986
Minister of Forests	Jack Heinrich	February 11, 1986	August 6, 1986
Minister of Health	Bob McClelland	December 22, 1975	November 24, 1979
Minister of Health	Rafe Mair	November 24, 1979	January 6, 1981
Minister of Health	Jim Nielsen	January 6, 1981	February 11, 1986
Minister of Health	Stephen Rogers	February 11, 1986	April 3, 1986
Minister of Health	Jim Nielsen	April 3, 1986	August 6, 1986
Minister of Highways and Public Works	Alex Fraser	December 22, 1975	December 5, 1978
Minister of Housing	Hugh Curtis	December 22, 1975	October 29, 1976
Minister of Human Resources	Bill Vander Zalm	December 22, 1975	December 5, 1978
Minister of Human Resources	Grace McCarthy	December 5, 1978	February 11, 1986
Minister of Human Resources	Jim Nielsen	February 11, 1986	August 6, 1986
Minister of Industry and Small Business Development (Note: "Industry, Tourism and Small Business Development" from November 24, 1979, to January 11, 1980)	Donald M. Phillips	November 24, 1979	February 27, 1985
Minister of Industry and Small Business Development	Bob McClelland	February 27, 1985	August 6, 1986
Minister of Intergovernmental Relations	Garde Gardom	November 24, 1979	August 6, 1986
Minister of International Trade, Science and Investment (Note: "International Trade and Investment" from February 27, 1985, to April 16, 1986)	Donald M. Phillips	February 27, 1985	February 11, 1986
Minister of International Trade, Science and Investment	Pat McGeer	February 11, 1986	August 6, 1986
Minister of Labour	Allan Williams	December 22, 1975	November 24, 1979
Minister of Labour	Jack Heinrich	November 24, 1979	August 10, 1982
Minister of Labour	Bob McClelland	August 10, 1982	February 27, 1985
Minister of Labour	Terry Segarty	February 27, 1985	August 6, 1986
Minister of Lands, Parks and Housing (Note: "Recreation and Conservation" from October 29, 1976, to December 5, 1978)	Sam Bawlf	October 29, 1976	December 5, 1978
Minister of Lands, Parks and Housing	James Chabot	December 5, 1978	August 10, 1982
Minister of Lands, Parks and Housing	Anthony Brummet	August 10, 1982	February 11, 1986
Minister of Lands, Parks and Housing	Jack Kempf	February 11, 1986	August 6, 1986
Minister of Municipal Affairs (Note: "Municipal Affairs and Housing" from October 29, 1976, to December 5, 1978)	Hugh Curtis	December 22, 1975	December 5, 1978
Minister of Municipal Affairs	Bill Vander Zalm	December 5, 1978	August 10, 1982
Minister of Municipal Affairs	Jack Heinrich	August 10, 1982	May 26, 1983
Minister of Municipal Affairs	Bill Ritchie	May 26, 1983	August 6, 1986
Minister of Post-Secondary Education	Russell Fraser	February 11, 1986	August 6, 1986
Provincial Secretary (Note: Held concurrently with Travel Industry from October 29, 1976, to December 5, 1978; held concurrently with Government Services from December 5, 1978, to August 6, 1986.)	Grace McCarthy	December 22, 1975	December 5, 1978
Provincial Secretary	Hugh Curtis	December 5, 1978	November 24, 1979
Provincial Secretary	Evan Wolfe	November 24, 1979	August 10, 1982
Provincial Secretary	James Chabot	August 10, 1982	February 11, 1986
Provincial Secretary	Grace McCarthy	February 11, 1986	August 6, 1986
Minister of Tourism (Note: "Recreation and Tourism" from December 22, 1975, to February 10, 1976; "Recreation and Travel Industry" from February 10, 1976, to October 29, 1976; "Travel Industry" and held concurrently with Provincial Secretary from October 29, 1976, to December 5, 1978; "Tourism and Small Business Development" from December 5, 1978, to November 24, 1979; "Industry, Tourism and Small Business Development" from November 24, 1979, to January 11, 1980.)	Grace McCarthy	December 22, 1975	December 5, 1978
Minister of Tourism	Elwood Veitch	December 5, 1978	June 5, 1979
Minister of Tourism	Don Phillips	June 5, 1979	January 11, 1980
Minister of Tourism	Patricia Jordan	January 11, 1980	August 10, 1982
Minister of Tourism	Claude Richmond	August 10, 1982	August 6, 1986
Minister of Transportation and Highways (Note: "Transport and Communications" from December 22, 1975, to October 29, 1976; "Energy, Transport and Communications" from October 29, 1976, to December 5, 1978; "Transportation, Communications and Highways" from December 5, 1978, to November 24, 1979.)	Jack Davis	December 22, 1975	October 29, 1976
Minister of Transportation and Highways	Vacant	October 29, 1976	December 5, 1978
Minister of Transportation and Highways	Alex Fraser	December 5, 1978	August 6, 1986
Minister of Universities, Science and Communications	Pat McGeer	November 24, 1979	February 11, 1986
