= Electoral history of Kim Campbell =

List of elections featuring Kim Campbell as a candidate

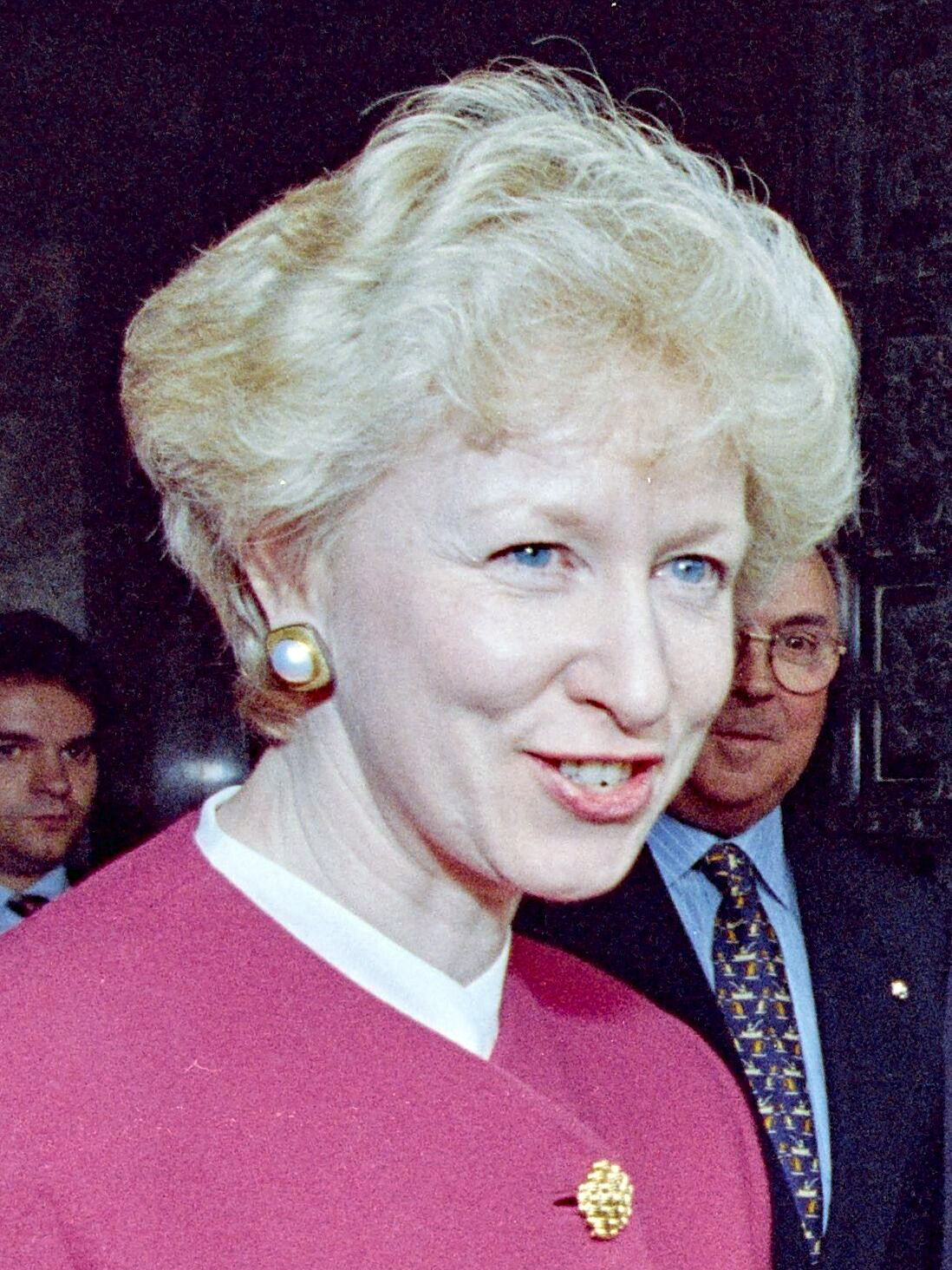
Kim Campbell in 1993.

This article is the Electoral history of Kim Campbell, the nineteenth Prime Minister of Canada.

A Progressive Conservative, Campbell was the first woman to serve as prime minister. She served one short term in 1993. She succeeded Brian Mulroney as prime minister and then led the Progressive Conservative Party of Canada in the general election of 1993. The Progressive Conservatives were almost wiped out in the election, going from a majority government of 154 seats at dissolution, to two seats and loss of party status in the House of Commons. It was the worst defeat of a federal government in Canadian history.

Campbell lost her own seat and announced her resignation on election night. Jean Chrétien, leader of the Liberal Party of Canada, succeeded her as prime minister. Jean Charest became leader of the Progressive Conservative party.

Campbell stood for election to the House of Commons twice. She was elected in the general election of 1988, but defeated in the 1993 election.

Prior to entering federal politics, Campbell had been involved in provincial and municipal politics in her home province of British Columbia.

== Summary ==
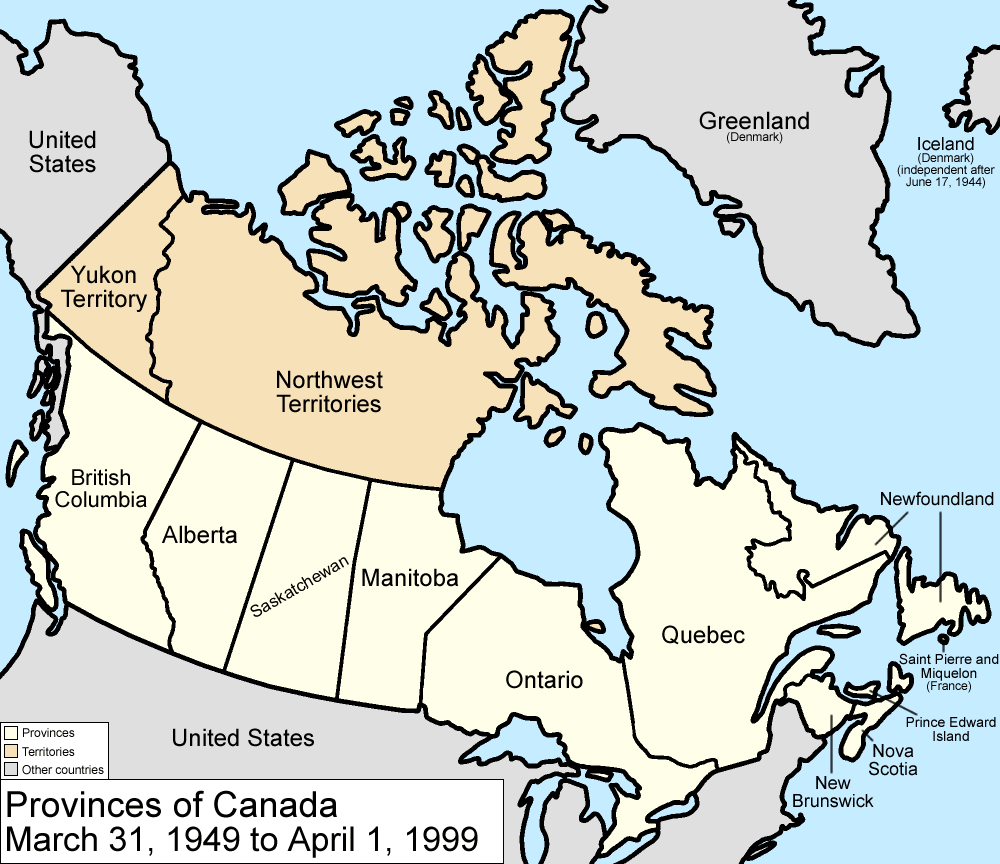
Canada had ten provinces and two territories throughout Campbell's time as Prime Minister.

Campbell ranks twenty-first out of twenty-three prime ministers for time in office, serving one term of 132 days. Only Charles Tupper and John Turner had shorter terms in office.

She was the second prime minister from British Columbia, the other being John Turner.

Mulroney announced his retirement early in 1993, triggering a leadership convention in June, 1993. Campbell won on the second ballot, defeating Jean Charest.

When she succeeded Mulroney as prime minister on June 25, 1993, there were only two months left in the five-year term of the 34th Canadian Parliament, which had been elected in 1988. Campbell was required to call a general election quickly. The election was a disaster for the Progressive Conservative party: they went from a solid majority in the Commons to only two seats. Under the rules of the House of Commons, the Progressive Conservatives did not have enough seats for official party status. It was the worst loss for a federal government in Canadian history.

Campbell was defeated in her own seat and announced her resignation. Jean Charest became the party leader.

Campbell stood for election to the Commons twice: she won her seat in 1988, and was defeated in 1993. She served in the Commons for four years, eleven months, and three days.

Prior to entering federal politics, Campbell had been on the Vancouver School Board, and then a member of the Legislative Assembly of British Columbia, elected as a member of the Social Credit Party of British Columbia. In 1986, she entered the leadership race for the Social Credit party, but came in last on the first ballot and was eliminated.

== Federal general election: 1993 ==
Campbell led the Progressive Conservative Party in one general election (1993). She was decisively defeated by Jean Chrétien and the Liberals, reduced to two seats in the House of Commons, the worst defeat of a federal government in Canadian history.

Canadian Federal Election, 1993 - Parties, Leaders, Seats Won and Popular Vote
Party	Leaders	Seats Won	Popular Vote
Liberal	Jean Chrétien^{1}	177	41.2%
Bloc Québécois	Lucien Bouchard^{2}	54	13.5%
Reform	Preston Manning	52	18.7%
New Democratic Party	Audrey McLaughlin	9	6.9%
Progressive Conservative	Kim Campbell^{3}	2	16.0%
Independent	–	1	0.7%
Total		295	97.0%^{4}
Sources: Library of Parliament – History of Federal Ridings since 1867

^{1} Leader of the Opposition when election was called; Prime Minister after election.
^{2} Not a Member of Parliament when election was called; Leader of the Opposition after the election.
^{3} Prime Minister when election was called; not a Member of Parliament after the election.
^{4} Table does not include parties which received votes but did not elect any members.

== Federal constituency elections: 1988 and 1993 ==
Campbell stood for election to the House of Commons two times. She was elected the first time, in 1988, but defeated the second time, in 1993.

=== 1988 Federal Election: Vancouver Centre ===
Federal Election, 1988: Vancouver Centre, British Columbia
Party	Candidate	Popular Vote	%
Progressive Conservative	Yes Kim Campbell	23,620	37.2%
New Democratic Party	Johanna Den Hertog	23,351	36.8%
Liberal	Tex Enemark	14,467	22.8%
Reform	Paula Folkard	876	1.4%
Green	Murray Gudmundson	514	0.8%
Rhinoceros	Bob Nitestalker Colebrook	262	0.4%
Libertarian	Duane H. Pye	156	0.2%
Independent	Scott Adams	125	0.2%
Non-affiliated	Dorothy-Jean O'Donnell	58	0.1%
Total		63,429	99.9%^{1}
Source: Library of Parliament – History of Federal Ridings since 1867: Vancouver Centre

Yes Elected.
^{1} Rounding error.

=== 1993 Federal Election: Vancouver Centre ===
Federal Election, 1993: Vancouver Centre, British Columbia
Party	Candidate	Popular Vote	%
Liberal	Yes Hedy Fry	20,095	31.1%
Progressive Conservative	X Kim Campbell	16,274	25.2%
Reform	Ian Isbister	11,235	17.4%
New Democratic Party	Betty Baxter	9,830	15.2%
National	Thorsten Ewald	5,144	8.0%
Natural Law	John Cowhig	670	1.0%
Green	Imtiaz Popat	616	1.0%
Christian Heritage	Darren Lowe	254	0.4%
Libertarian	Tunya Audain	252	0.4%
Independent	Brian Godzilla Gnu Salmi	109	0.2%
Independent	Scott Adams	99	0.2%
Commonwealth of Canada	Lucille Boikoff	27	0.0%^{1}
Independent	Peter C. Nuthall	24	0.0%^{1}
Total		64,629	99.9%^{2}
Source: Library of Parliament – History of Federal Ridings since 1867: Vancouver Centre

Yes Elected.
X Incumbent.
^{1} Less than 0.5%; rounded to zero.
^{2} Rounding error.

== British Columbia Constituency Elections: 1983, 1986 ==
Campbell stood for election in two provincial elections, 1983 and 1986, as a candidate for the British Columbia Social Credit Party. She was defeated in 1983, but elected in 1986.

=== British Columbia constituency election: 1983 ===
1983 British Columbia Election: Vancouver Centre
Party	Candidate	Popular Vote	%
New Democratic Party	Yes X Emery Oakland Barnes	18,960	28.7%
New Democratic Party	Yes X Gary Vernon Lauk	18,743	28.4%
Social Credit	Kim Campbell	12,740	19.3%
Social Credit	Philip Owen	12,415	18.8%
Liberal	Shirley McLoughlin	2,084	3.2%
Progressive Conservative	Kevin Baden Bruce	880	1.3%
Communist	Maurice Rush	244	0.4%
Total		66,066	100.0%^{1}

Note: the riding returned two members.

Yes Elected.
X Incumbent.
^{1} Rounding error.

=== British Columbia constituency election: 1986 ===
1986 British Columbia Election: Vancouver-Point Grey
Party	Candidate	Popular Vote	%
Social Credit	Yes Kim Campbell	19,716	23.2%
New Democratic Party	Yes Darlene Marzari	18,311	21.6%
Social Credit	X Patrick Lucey McGeer	18,256	21.5%
New Democratic Party	Richard J. Gathercole	15,729	18.5%
Liberal	Doreen Braverman	6,680	7.9%
Liberal	Thomas Airlie Brown	5,505	6.5%
Green	Douglas Dunn	498	0.6%
People's Front	Allen Harvey Soroka	120	0.1%
Total		84,815	99.9%^{1}

Note: the riding returned two members.

Yes Elected.
X Incumbent.
^{1} Rounding error.

== Vancouver municipal politics ==
Campbell began her political career by standing for the Vancouver School Board (1981–1984). She served two terms, including terms as Chair (1983) and Vice-Chair (1984).

=== 1980 School board election ===
1980 Vancouver municipal election: Vancouver School Board
Party	Candidate	Votes	%	Elected
Independent	Tom Alsbury	44,479	5.68	✓
COPE	Philip Rankin	44,165	5.64	✓
COPE	Pauline Weinstein	40,245	5.13	✓
NPA	Kim Campbell	38,340	4.89	✓
NPA	Jonathan Baker (X)	37,743	4.82	✓
COPE	Mike O'Neill	34,094	4.35	✓
NPA	Bill Brown (X)	34,012	4.34	✓
COPE	Wes Knapp	33,623	4.29	✓
COPE	Gary Onstad	33,465	4.27	✓
NPA	Bryan Hannay (X)	32,932	4.20	
NPA	Karl Erdman (X)	32,868	4.19	
COPE	Connie Fogal	32,465	4.14	
NPA	Peter Hebb (X)	31,378	4.00	
NPA	Kenneth Denike	30,844	3.94	
NPA	Michael Seeling	30,507	3.89	
COPE	Margaret Chunn	28,482	3.63	
TEAM	Norman Robinson (X)	28,288	3.61	
COPE	Mike Chrunik	25,658	3.27	
NPA	Gordon Sim	25,557	3.26	
COPE	Nick Nicolopoulos	23,488	3.00	
TEAM	Umberto Callegarini	20,296	2.59	
TEAM	Christie Jung	18,815	2.40	
TEAM	John Gemmill	18,782	2.40	
Independent	Ken Livingstone	16,895	2.16	
Independent	Sandra Rogen	13,024	1.66	
TEAM	Jean-Claude Arluison	11,777	1.50	
TEAM	Alan Tapper	11,711	1.49	
Independent	Nellie Martin	9,812	1.25	

=== 1982 School board election ===
1982 Vancouver municipal election: Vancouver School Board
Party	Candidate	Votes	%	Elected
NPA	A. Kim Campbell (X)	50,076	5.91	✓
COPE	Pauline Weinstein (X)	48,998	5.78	✓
COPE	Phil Rankin (X)	48,629	5.74	✓
Independent	Tom Alsbury (X)	45,335	5.35	✓
NPA	William Brown (X)	44,676	5.27	✓
NPA	Bryan W. Hannay	43,978	5.19	✓
NPA	Graeme Waymark	43,505	5.13	✓
NPA	Ken Livingstone	42,503	5.01	✓
COPE	Wes Knapp (X)	42,415	5.00	✓
COPE	Michael O'Neill (X)	41,645	4.91	
NPA	Karl L. Erdman	41,644	4.91	
COPE	Gary Onstad (X)	40,785	4.81	
NPA	Ken Denike	39,974	4.72	
NPA	David C. Smith	38,510	4.54	
COPE	Frank Fuller	37,913	4.47	
NPA	Neil Kornfeld	37,928	4.47	
COPE	David Lane	35,236	4.16	
COPE	Sandra Rogen	34,595	4.08	
Independent	Peter Westlake	27,079	3.19	
COPE	Jasjit Sandhu	25,303	2.98	
Independent	Brian Barber	22,388	2.64	
Independent	Alan Tapper	14,653	1.73	

== Leadership Conventions ==
=== Progressive Conservative Party of Canada: 1993 ===
Mulroney announced his retirement in February 1993. Campbell won the party leadership at a convention in June, 1993, winning on the second ballot.

Progressive Conservative Leadership Convention, June 13, 1993 Voting results by ballot
Candidate	First Ballot		Second Ballot	
Candidate	Votes cast	%	Votes cast	%
Kim Campbell	1,664	48.0%	1,817	52.6%
Jean Charest	1,369	39.5%	1,639	47.4%
Jim Edwards	307; Withdrew after first ballot.	8.8%	–	–
Garth Turner	76; Withdrew after first ballot.	2.2%	–	–
Patrick Boyer	53; Eliminated after first ballot.	1.5%	–	–
Total	3,469	100.0%	3,456	100.0%
Source: CPAC – 1993 Progressive Conservative Leadership Convention

=== Social Credit Party of British Columbia: 1986 ===
Following the resignation of Bill Bennett as leader of the British Columbia Social Credit Party, there was a leadership convention in July, 1986. Campbell was a candidate in the crowded field, but was eliminated on the first ballot.

British Columbia Social Credit Leadership Convention, July 29–30, 1986 Voting results by ballot
Candidate	First Ballot		Second Ballot		Third Ballot		Fourth Ballot	
Candidate	Votes cast	%	Votes cast	%	Votes cast	%	Votes cast	%
Bill Vander Zalm	367	28.4%	457	35.7%	625	49.1%	801	63.8%
Grace McCarthy	244	18.9%	280	21.9%	305; Eliminated after third ballot.	24.0%	–	–
Bud Smith	202	15.6%	219; Withdrew after second ballot.	17.1%	–	–	–	–
Brian Smith	196	15.1%	255	19.9%	342	26.9%	454	36.2%
Jim Nielsen	54	4.2%	30; Eliminated after second ballot.	2.3%	–	–	–	–
John Reynolds	54	4.2%	39; Withdrew after second ballot.	3.0%	–	–	–	–
Stephen Rogers	43; Withdrew after first ballot.	3.3%	–	–	–	–	–	–
Bob Wenman	40; Withdrew after first ballot.	3.1%	–	–	–	–	–	–
Cliff Michael	32; Withdrew after first ballot.	2.5%	–	–	–	–	–	–
Bill Ritchie	28; Withdrew after first ballot.	2.2%	–	–	–	–	–	–
Mel Couvelier	20; Withdrew after first ballot.	1.5%	–	–	–	–	–	–
Kim Campbell	14; Eliminated after first ballot.	1.1%	–	–	–	–	–	–
Total	1,294	100.1%^{1}	1,280	99.9%^{1}	1,272	100.0%	1,255	100.0%

^{1} Rounding error.

== See also ==
- Electoral history of Brian Mulroney – Campbell's predecessor as leader of the Progressive Conservative Party and as prime minister.
- Electoral history of Jean Chrétien – Campbell's successor as prime minister.
