= Elwood Veitch =

Canadian politician (1929-1993)

Member of the British Columbia Legislative Assembly for Burnaby-Willingdon
- In office May 5, 1983 – October 17, 1991
- Preceded by: Jim Lorimer
- Succeeded by: Joan Sawicki
- In office December 11, 1975 – May 10, 1979
- Preceded by: Jim Lorimer
- Succeeded by: Jim Lorimer

Personal details
- Born: July 21, 1929 Monck Township, Ontario
- Died: September 18, 1993 (aged 64)
- Party: Social Credit
- Spouse: Sheila Boyce (m. 1953)
- Education: University of British Columbia; Columbia Pacific University
- Occupation: Financial administrator

Elwood Neal Veitch (July 21, 1929 – September 18, 1993) was a financial administrator and political figure in British Columbia, Canada. He represented Burnaby-Willingdon in the Legislative Assembly of British Columbia from 1975 to 1979 and from 1983 to 1991 as a Social Credit (Socred) member, and served in the provincial cabinet under premiers Bill Bennett, Bill Vander Zalm and Rita Johnston.

== Biography ==
Veitch was born in Monck Township, Ontario, the son of Wellington Veitch and Alice Alma Brott. He was educated in Bracebridge and Ajax, and earned a business diploma from the University of British Columbia; he went on to receive a master's degree in business administration by correspondence from Columbia Pacific University. He married Sheila Gertrude Boyce in 1953.

He ran as a Social Credit candidate in the 1975 provincial election, and defeated the incumbent New Democratic Party (NDP) candidate Jim Lorimer to become the member of the Legislative Assembly for Burnaby-Willingdon. Initially a backbencher, he chaired the legislative committee on crown corporations before being named to Premier Bill Bennett's cabinet in December 1978, serving as Minister of Tourism and Small Business Development.

He lost to Lorimer in the 1979 election, then took the seat back from Lorimer in 1983, and served as parliamentary secretary to the Minister of Education in the 33rd Parliament. He re-entered Bennett's cabinet in February 1986 as Minister of Consumer and Corporate Affairs, and retained the role after Bill Vander Zalm took over as premier that August.

Veitch defeated NDP candidate Joan Sawicki in the October 1986 election, and was named Provincial Secretary and Minister of Government Services that November, before becoming Minister of Regional Development in July 1988; he additionally served as Minister of State for the Mainland/Southwest Region beginning in October 1987. He was also named acting Attorney General in June 1988 following Brian Smith's resignation, although this appointment was not confirmed by an Order in Council.

He was re-assigned as Minister of International Business and Immigration in November 1989, and additionally became Minister of Finance and Corporate Relations in March 1991 following Mel Couvelier's resignation. Rita Johnston replaced Vander Zalm as premier in April 1991, and assigned Veitch as Provincial Secretary and Minister responsible for Multiculturalism and Immigration. He ran for re-election that October, but lost to Sawicki as part of the Socreds' electoral collapse.

He died in 1993 at the age of 64.

Political offices
| Preceded by himself (International Business and Immigration) | Minister responsible for Multiculturalism and Immigration of British Columbia; April 15, 1991 – November 5, 1991 | Succeeded by Anita Hagen (Multiculturalism and Human Rights) |
| Preceded by Howard Dirks | Provincial Secretary of British Columbia; April 15, 1991 – November 5, 1991 | Succeeded by Position abolished |
| Preceded by Mel Couvelier | Minister of Finance and Corporate Relations of British Columbia; March 7, 1991 – April 8, 1991 | Succeeded by Mel Couvelier |
| Preceded by John Jansen | Minister of International Business and Immigration of British Columbia; November 1, 1989 – April 15, 1991 | Succeeded by Position abolished |
| Preceded by Position established | Minister of Regional Development of British Columbia; July 6, 1988 – November 1, 1989 | Succeeded by Stan Hagen (Regional and Economic Development) |
| Preceded by Position established | Minister of State, Mainland/Southwest of British Columbia; October 22, 1987 – November 1, 1989 | Succeeded by Position abolished |
| Preceded by Hugh Austin Curtis | Provincial Secretary and Minister of Government Services of British Columbia; November 6, 1986 – July 6, 1988 | Succeeded by William Earl Reid (Provincial Secretary); Cliff Michael (Government Management Services) |
| Preceded by Jim Hewitt | Minister of Consumer and Corporate Affairs of British Columbia; February 11, 1986 – November 6, 1986 | Succeeded by Position abolished |
| Preceded by Grace McCarthy (Provincial Secretary and Minister of Travel Industry) | Minister of Tourism and Small Business Development of British Columbia; December 5, 1978 – June 5, 1979 | Succeeded by Don Phillips |
