= British Columbia Social Credit Party leadership elections =

The British Columbia Social Credit Party was a conservative political party in the province of British Columbia, Canada. The provincial Social Credit movement was divided in its early years and was largely under the influence of the Alberta Social Credit League; it did not have a functional leadership before 1952.

The 1952 leadership convention was held when the party was largely dominated by the Alberta leadership of the national social credit movement. Alberta Premier Ernest Manning hand-picked Ernest George Hansell to lead the British Columbia party into the election despite the fact that Hansell was an Alberta politician. W. A. C. Bennett was chosen party leader by Social Credit members of the legislative assembly (MLAs) following the provincial election.

In 1973, the party elected W. A. C. Bennett's son, Bill Bennett, on the first ballot.

All of the party's leadership conventions before 1993 were delegated, i.e., local party riding associations selected delegates to attend a convention and elect a leader by secret ballot. The 1993 leadership election was determined by a "one-member, one-vote" system, using mail-in preferential ballots. The 1994 leadership election used the same system, but did not incorporate preferential balloting as there were only two candidates.

== 1952 leadership convention ==
Held April 27, 1952

- Reverend Ernest George Hansell acclaimed
- W. A. C. Bennett (declined nomination)
- Lyle Wicks (declined nomination)

At this time the Alberta Social Credit League still dominated the British Columbia association. Hansell, an Alberta Social Credit Member of Parliament, was the hand-picked candidate of Alberta Premier Ernest Manning. Bennett and Wicks were both nominated from the floor, but declined allowing Hansell to be acclaimed. Following the general election in which Social Credit unexpectedly emerged as the largest party, Wicks, who was the British Columbia party's president, called a new leadership vote at which only elected Social Credit MLAs could vote. In this contest, held on July 15, 1952, Bennett defeated Philip Gaglardi by a margin of 10 to 9 to become Social Credit leader and was invited by the lieutenant-governor to become Premier of the province.

== 1973 leadership convention ==
(Held on November 24, 1973.)

First Ballot:

- William R. Bennett 883
- Bob McClelland 269
- Harvey Schroeder 204
- James Chabot 97
- Ed Smith 74
- James Mason 10

== 1986 leadership convention ==
(Held on July 29–30, 1986.)

First Ballot:

- Bill Vander Zalm 367
- Grace McCarthy 244
- Bud Smith 202
- Brian Smith 196
- Jim Nielsen 54
- John Reynolds 54
- Stephen Rogers 43
- Bob Wenman 40
- Cliff Michael 32
- Bill Ritchie 28
- Mel Couvelier 20
- Kim Campbell 14

Second Ballot (Campbell eliminated, five others withdraw):

- Bill Vander Zalm 457
- Grace McCarthy 280
- Brian Smith 255
- Bud Smith 219
- John Reynolds 39
- Jim Nielsen 30

Third Ballot (Nielsen eliminated, Reynolds and Bud Smith withdraw):

- Bill Vander Zalm 625
- Brian Smith 342
- Grace McCarthy 305

Fourth Ballot (McCarthy eliminated):

- Bill Vander Zalm 801
- Brian Smith 454

== 1991 interim leadership ==
On April 2, 1991, Rita Johnston was elected by the party's MLAs as their interim leader, defeating Russell Fraser by 21 votes to 17 on the fourth ballot. Claude Richmond, Norm Jacobsen and Mel Couvelier had previously been eliminated.

== 1991 leadership convention ==
(Held on July 20, 1991.)

First Ballot:

- Grace McCarthy 659
- Rita Johnston 652
- Mel Couvelier 331
- Norm Jacobsen 169
- Duane Crandell 35

Second Ballot (Couvelier supports Johnston):

- Rita Johnston 941
- Grace McCarthy 881

== 1993 leadership election ==
(Held on November 6, 1993.)

First Ballot:

- Grace McCarthy 7,338
- Graham Bruce 5,321
- Claude Richmond 2,083
- Jim Turner 91

Second Ballot:

- Grace McCarthy 7,351
- Graham Bruce 5,352
- Claude Richmond 2,099

Third Ballot:

- Grace McCarthy 7,700
- Graham Bruce 6,245

== 1994 leadership election ==
(Announced on November 4, 1994.)

First Ballot:

- Larry Gillanders 1,034
- John Caleb 787
