= Stan Hagen =

Canadian politician (1940–2009)

Member of the British Columbia Legislative Assembly for Comox Valley
- In office May 16, 2001 – January 20, 2009
- Preceded by: Evelyn Gillespie
- Succeeded by: Don McRae

Member of the British Columbia Legislative Assembly for Comox
- In office October 22, 1986 – October 17, 1991
- Preceded by: Karen Sanford
- Succeeded by: Margaret Lord

Personal details
- Born: Stanley Brian Hagen; March 11, 1940 New Westminster, British Columbia
- Died: January 20, 2009 (aged 68) Victoria, British Columbia
- Party: Social Credit → BC Liberal
- Spouse: Judith Robins (m. 1967)
- Education: Pacific Lutheran University

Stanley Brian Hagen (March 11, 1940 – January 20, 2009) was a Canadian politician who served in the Legislative Assembly of British Columbia on two separate occasions. He was the Member of the Legislative Assembly (MLA) for the riding of Comox from 1986 to 1991 as part of the British Columbia Social Credit Party (Socred), and MLA for the riding of Comox Valley as part of the British Columbia Liberal Party from 2001 until his death. During his political career, he served as minister for 10 different ministries; he was the Minister of Agriculture and Lands when he died.

== Background ==
Stan Hagen was born in New Westminster to mother Sigrid Thompson and father Baard Hagen, a butcher who operated a meat and grocery store in that city; Baard was originally from Norway. After graduating from Pacific Lutheran University in 1963, Stan Hagen married Judith Robins in 1967, with whom he had five children. He had lived in the Comox Valley since 1968 with his family, working as a comptroller for a construction company before starting his own ready-mix concrete business. From 1972 to 1978 he served as a trustee with the Comox Valley School District.

== Politics ==
=== Social Credit Party ===
Running for the Social Credit Party, Hagen was first elected to the provincial legislature in 1986 to represent the riding of Comox. He was named to the cabinet of Premier Bill Vander Zalm that November as Minister of Continuing Education and Job Training; his title was modified to Minister of Advanced Education and Job Training one month later. He resigned from the post in July 1987 amidst allegations of conflict of interest involving his ready-mix company, but was re-instated that August. He additionally served as Minister of State for the Vancouver Island/Coast Region between October 1987 and July 1988, and as Minister Responsible for Science and Technology from July 1988 to November 1989.

He was re-assigned in November 1989 as Minister of Regional and Economic Development, before becoming Minister of Education in December 1990. Hagen was best known for being integral in the creation of Science World and for his support of the TRIUMF particle accelerator at the University of British Columbia. Following Vander Zalm's resignation as premier in April 1991, Hagen continued as Minister of Education in Rita Johnston's cabinet, and briefly covered the portfolio of Advanced Education, Training and Technology in the month of May 1991. He lost his seat in the 1991 election when all but seven Socred MLAs were defeated.

=== Liberal Party ===
He worked at a paving company as general manager until his return to politics in 2001, when he ran for the BC Liberals in the riding of Comox Valley in that year's provincial election, defeating incumbent New Democratic Party candidate Evelyn Gillespie. He was named to Premier Gordon Campbell's cabinet as Minister of Sustainable Resource Management that June, and additionally served as Minister of Agriculture, Food and Fisheries from January to April 2003 while John van Dongen was under investigation by the Royal Canadian Mounted Police. He was re-assigned as Minister of Human Resources in January 2004, then replaced the outgoing Christy Clark as Minister of Children and Family Development that September. He was diagnosed with prostate cancer in 2004 and received treatment.

After winning re-election in 2005, he kept the same post in the Campbell cabinet before being named Minister of Tourism, Sport and the Arts in August 2006. He served as Minister of Agriculture and Lands from June 2008 until January 20, 2009, when he died of a massive heart attack at the age of 68.

== Honours ==
He received an honorary doctor of laws degree from Simon Fraser University in June 1998. In August 2009, Hagen was inducted into the Comox Valley Walk of Achievement. In December 2011, Hagen was memorialized by the Salvation Army, which renamed its Victoria Family Centre the "Stan Hagen Centre for Families". Stan Hagen Nature Park and Stan Hagen Theatre, both in the city of Courtenay, were named in his honour.

While still in office, he was honoured by the K'omoks First Nation with the name "Ti’ axwsam" (Red Cod).

British Columbia provincial government of Gordon Campbell
Cabinet posts (6)
Predecessor	Office	Successor
Pat Bell	Minister of Agriculture and Lands; June 23, 2008 – January 20, 2009	Ron Cantelon
Olga Ilich	Minister of Tourism, Sport and the Arts; August 15, 2006 – June 23, 2008	Bill Bennett as Minister of Tourism, Culture and the Arts
Christy Clark	Minister of Children and Family Development; September 20, 2004 – August 15, 2006	Tom Christensen
Murray Coell	Minister of Human Resources; January 26, 2004 – September 20, 2004	Susan Brice
John van Dongen	Minister of Agriculture, Food and Fisheries; January 28, 2003 – April 3, 2003	John van Dongen
Position established	Minister of Sustainable Resource Management; June 5, 2001 – January 26, 2004	George Abbott
British Columbia provincial government of Rita Johnston
Cabinet posts (2)
Predecessor	Office	Successor
Bruce Strachan	Minister of Advanced Education, Training and Technology; May 7, 1991 – May 29, 1991	Peter Albert Dueck
cont'd from Vander Zalm ministry	Minister of Education; April 2, 1991 – November 5, 1991	Anita Hagen
British Columbia provincial government of Bill Vander Zalm
Cabinet posts (6)
Predecessor	Office	Successor
Anthony Brummet	Minister of Education; December 13, 1990 – April 2, 1991	cont'd into Johnston ministry
Elwood Veitch as Minister of Regional Development	Minister of Regional and Economic Development; November 1, 1989 – December 13, 1990	Bud Smith
Position established	Minister Responsible for Science and Technology; July 6, 1988 – November 1, 1989	Position abolished
Position established	Minister of State for the Vancouver Island/Coast Region; October 22, 1987 – July 6, 1988	Terry Huberts as Minister of State for the Vancouver Island/Coast and North Coast Regions
himself	Minister of Advanced Education and Job Training; August 6, 1987 – November 1, 1989	Bruce Strachan as Minister of Advanced Education, Training and Technology
Russell Fraser as Minister of Post-Secondary Education	Minister of Continuing Education and Job Training; November 6, 1986 – July 29, 1987; Minister of Advanced Education and Job Training from December 10, 1986	himself
