= Claude Richmond =

Canadian politician

35th Speaker of the Legislative Assembly of British Columbia
- In office June 19, 2001 – May 16, 2005
- Preceded by: Bill Hartley
- Succeeded by: Bill Barisoff

Member of the British Columbia Legislative Assembly for Kamloops
- In office May 16, 2001 – May 12, 2009
- Preceded by: Cathy McGregor
- Succeeded by: Riding abolished
- In office December 14, 1981 – October 17, 1991 Serving with Bud Smith (1986-91)
- Preceded by: Rafe Mair
- Succeeded by: Arthur Charbonneau

Minister of Tourism of British Columbia
- In office August 10, 1982 – August 14, 1986
- Premier: Bill Bennett; Bill Vander Zalm
- Preceded by: Patricia Jordan
- Succeeded by: William Earl Reid

Minister of Social Services and Housing of British Columbia
- In office August 14, 1986 – November 1, 1989
- Premier: Bill Vander Zalm
- Preceded by: Jack Kempf (Lands, Parks and Housing)
- Succeeded by: Peter Albert Dueck

Minister of State, Okanagan of British Columbia
- In office October 22, 1987 – July 6, 1988
- Premier: Bill Vander Zalm
- Preceded by: Position established
- Succeeded by: Howard Dirks (Thompson–Okanagan and Kootenays)

Minister of Tourism and Provincial Secretary of British Columbia
- In office September 22, 1989 – November 1, 1989
- Premier: Bill Vander Zalm
- Preceded by: William Earl Reid
- Succeeded by: Cliff Michael (Tourism); Howard Dirks (Provincial Secretary)

Minister of Forests of British Columbia
- In office November 1, 1989 – November 5, 1991
- Premier: Bill Vander Zalm; Rita Johnston
- Preceded by: Dave Parker
- Succeeded by: Dan Miller

Minister of Employment and Income Assistance of British Columbia
- In office June 16, 2005 – June 23, 2008
- Premier: Gordon Campbell
- Preceded by: Position established
- Succeeded by: Position abolished

Personal details
- Born: Claude Harry Richmond; August 3, 1935 (age 91) Blue River, British Columbia
- Party: Social Credit; Liberal
- Spouse: Patricia Simpson (m. 1958)

Claude Harry Richmond (born August 3, 1935) is a former Canadian politician who served as a member of the Legislative Assembly of British Columbia, representing the riding of Kamloops from 1981 to 1991 as part of the British Columbia Social Credit Party (Socred), and from 2001 to 2009 as part of the British Columbia Liberal Party. He held various cabinet positions under premiers Bill Bennett, Bill Vander Zalm, Rita Johnston and Gordon Campbell, and served as Speaker of the Legislative Assembly from 2001 to 2005.

== Background ==
Born in Blue River, British Columbia, Richmond grew up in the Kamloops area and attended Kamloops Senior Secondary School. After serving with the Royal Canadian Air Force and working in small business, he served on the Kamloops City Council for two terms in the 1970s, then worked as manager of CHNL AM610 from 1978 to 1982.

He married his wife Patricia in 1958; they have three children together.

== Provincial politics ==
=== Social Credit Party ===
Running for the Social Credit Party, he was first elected as Member of the Legislative Assembly (MLA) for Kamloops in a 1981 by-election to replace Rafe Mair, and was named to the cabinet as Minister of Tourism by Premier Bill Bennett in August 1982. He kept the portfolio after winning re-election in 1983.

After Bill Vander Zalm replaced Bennett as premier in August 1986, Richmond was re-assigned as Minister of Social Services and Housing. He was re-elected in that October's provincial election; with Kamloops being revised to a dual-member district, Richmond served that term alongside Bud Smith. He retained his cabinet portfolio, and additionally served as Minister of State for the Okanagan Region from October 1987 to July 1988. Following the resignation of Bill Reid as Minister of Tourism and Provincial Secretary, Richmond briefly assumed those roles from September to November 1989, before becoming Minister of Forests. He was also the Government House Leader from 1988 to 1991.

Vander Zalm resigned as premier and party leader in April 1991; Richmond unsuccessfully contested the ensuing interim leadership vote, and subsequently stayed on as Minister of Forests under new premier Rita Johnston. He declined to run in that year's provincial election, which saw the Socreds reduced to only seven seats in the legislature. Following Johnston's resignation in January 1992, Richmond ran again for party leader. In the November 1993 leadership election, he came in third place behind Graham Bruce and eventual winner Grace McCarthy on the second ballot, and was eliminated.

While away from politics, Richmond conducted consultancy work in the resource sector, and served as managing director of Kamloops Airport Limited from 1997 to 2001.

=== Liberal Party ===
He returned to politics in 2001 by running again in Kamloops in that year's provincial election, this time for the BC Liberals. He defeated the incumbent New Democratic Party candidate Cathy McGregor to re-enter the legislature, and was chosen as Speaker of the Legislative Assembly. After winning re-election in 2005, he was named to Premier Gordon Campbell's cabinet that June as Minister of Employment and Income Assistance.

On May 9, 2008, he announced that he would not stand for re-election in the 2009 provincial election; he was dropped from the cabinet that June.
