= Johnson ministry =

Johnson ministry may refer to:

- First Johnson ministry, the British minority government led by Boris Johnson from July to December 2019
- Second Johnson ministry, the British majority government led by Boris Johnson from 2019 to 2022
- Boss Johnson ministry, the government of the Canadian province of British Columbia from 1947 to 1952

== See also ==
- Premiership of Boris Johnson
- Johnson cabinet (disambiguation)
