= Bennett ministry =

The Bennett ministry may refer to three cabinets led by members of the Bennett political family in Canada.

- The 15th Canadian Ministry, led by Prime Minister R. B. Bennett (1930–1935)
- The Bill Bennett ministry, the 27th British Columbian ministry (1975–1986)
- The W. A. C. Bennett ministry, the 25th British Columbian ministry (1952–1972)
