= Minister of Public Safety and Solicitor General =

Minister of Public Safety and Solicitor General may refer to:

- The minister in charge of the Ministry of Public Safety and Solicitor General (British Columbia)
- The minister in charge of the Department of Justice and Public Safety (New Brunswick) from 2000 to 2016
