= Jack Davis (Canadian politician) =

Canadian politician (1916-1991)

The Honourable Jack Davis PC
- Official 1973 portrait

Member of the British Columbia Legislative Assembly for North Vancouver-Seymour
- In office December 11, 1975 – March 27, 1991
- Preceded by: Colin Gabelmann
- Succeeded by: Daniel Jarvis

Member of the Canadian Parliament for Capilano Coast—Capilano (1962-1968)
- In office September 27, 1962 – May 9, 1974
- Preceded by: William H. Payne
- Succeeded by: Ron Huntington

Personal details
- Born: July 31, 1916 Kamloops, British Columbia, Canada
- Died: March 27, 1991 (aged 74) West Vancouver, British Columbia, Canada
- Party: Liberal (federal); Social Credit (provincial)
- Education: University of British Columbia (BASc); McGill University (PhD); Oxford University (BA, MA)
- Profession: Engineer

Military service
- Allegiance: Canada
- Branch/service: Royal Canadian Air Force

John Davis, PC (July 31, 1916 – March 27, 1991) was a Canadian engineer, economist and politician from British Columbia. He served as member of Parliament as part of the Liberal Party of Canada, representing Coast—Capilano from 1962 to 1968, and Capilano from 1968 to 1974. He subsequently represented North Vancouver-Seymour in the Legislative Assembly of British Columbia from 1975 to 1991 as a member of the Social Credit Party. He was a federal and provincial cabinet minister under Prime Minister Pierre Trudeau, and premiers Bill Bennett and Bill Vander Zalm.

== Early life and career ==
Born in Kamloops General Hospital, Davis grew up in Tranquille Valley on a 160-acre (0.65 km^{2}) homestead where he attended school in a one-room log cabin. The Davis family moved into Kamloops so that Jack could attend grade 8 at Kamloops High School; he was elected student council president, and graduated in 1935. He won provincial scholarships in junior and senior matriculation, the latter with the highest marks in British Columbia. He attended the University of British Columbia (UBC), where he was president of the Men's Undergraduate Society. He also played for the UBC Thunderbird basketball team, which won the Canadian Men's Senior Championship in 1937. He graduated with a Bachelor of Applied Science degree in chemical engineering in 1939, and was chosen Rhodes Scholar from British Columbia.

His attendance at St John's College, Oxford University, was interrupted by the Second World War. He was on the research team at McGill University developing a new process for manufacturing RDX, and gained his PhD in Science in 1942. Towards the end of the war, he served with the Royal Canadian Air Force as a flight engineer. He worked at Shawinigan Chemicals and A. V. Roe Canada, then studied economics and politics at Oxford, graduating with bachelor's and master's degrees. He subsequently worked at the federal Department of Trade and Commerce as director of the Economics Branch, and served as senior economist for the Royal Commission on Canada's Economic Prospects, then returned to British Columbia in 1957 and joined the BC Electric Company as director of research and planning.

He and his wife Margaret had two sons and a daughter; the family lived in West Vancouver.

== Politics ==
=== Federal ===
Davis was elected to the Canadian House of Commons in the 1962 federal election to represent Coast—Capilano, a riding which stretched from Deep Cove in the District of North Vancouver to Powell River and Pemberton. A member of the then-minority Liberal Party of Canada, he was re-elected the following year in the train of the national Liberal victory, and was appointed as the Parliamentary Secretary to Prime Minister Lester B. Pearson. Following his re-election in 1965, he was named Parliamentary Secretary to the Minister of Mines and Technical Surveys (later re-titled to Minister of Energy, Mines and Resources).

He was re-elected in the 1968 federal election for the new riding of Capilano, and was named Minister without Portfolio in the government of Pierre Trudeau that April, before becoming Minister of Fisheries that July; his portfolio was modified to Minister of Fisheries and Forestry in April 1969. He became the first Minister of the Environment in Canada and the English-speaking world in June 1971, and kept the post after winning re-election in 1972.

=== Provincial ===
Following his loss in the 1974 federal election, he contested the 1975 British Columbia general election as a Social Credit Party candidate, and defeated the incumbent New Democratic Party candidate Colin Gabelmann to become the member of the Legislative Assembly (MLA) for North Vancouver-Seymour. He was named to Premier Bill Bennett's cabinet that December as Minister of Transport and Communications; his role was subsequently amended to Minister of Energy, Transport and Communications in October 1976.

Davis came under investigation by the Royal Canadian Mounted Police in 1978 over his practice of converting government-paid first class airline tickets to economy class and keeping the difference in airfare. He resigned from cabinet that April at Bennett's demand, and was convicted of defrauding the crown that September; he received a $1,000 fine and was placed on probation for two months. He won re-election in 1979 and 1983, and chaired the rapid transit committee leading up to the construction of Vancouver's first SkyTrain line.

He supported Bill Vander Zalm in the 1986 Social Credit leadership race; after Vander Zalm took over as premier that August, Davis re-entered the provincial cabinet as Minister of Energy, Mines and Petroleum Resources. He was re-elected MLA in that October's provincial election, and kept the same role in the Vander Zalm ministry until dying in office of cancer in March 1991.

== Legacy ==
There are two scholarships to UBC awarded in memory of Davis. The Jack Davis Scholarship in Energy Studies is a $2,700 scholarship that has been endowed by Westcoast Energy Inc. in memory of the Honourable Jack Davis. The award is made to a graduate student in energy studies at the University of British Columbia. The second Jack Davis scholarship is awarded annually to an outstanding all-round North Shore secondary school graduate to assist in his or her entering the University of British Columbia.

A provincial government office building located at 1810 Blanshard Street in Victoria was named the Jack Davis Building. An energy audit prepared for the Alternative Energy Policy Branch of the Ministry of Energy and Mines in 2005 found that the building was currently operating at a high level of energy efficiency. The initial design of the building, which won the building acclaim upon completion in 1992, is still reaping the benefits of energy efficient construction via low energy expenditures.

British Columbia provincial government of Bill Vander Zalm
Cabinet post (1)
Predecessor	Office	Successor
Anthony Brummet	Minister of Energy, Mines and Petroleum Resources; August 14, 1986 – March 27, 1991	Jack Weisgerber
British Columbia provincial government of Bill Bennett
Cabinet posts (2)
Predecessor	Office	Successor
himself (Transport and Communications)	Minister of Energy, Transport and Communications; October 29, 1976 – April 3, 1978	Bill Bennett
Carl Liden	Minister of Transport and Communications; December 22, 1975 – October 29, 1976	himself (Energy, Transport and Communications)
20th Canadian Ministry (1968–1979) – First cabinet of Pierre Trudeau
Cabinet posts (3)
Predecessor	Office	Successor
himself (Fisheries and Forestry)	Minister of the Environment; June 11, 1971 – August 8, 1974	Jeanne Sauvé
himself (Fisheries); Jean Marchand (Forestry and Rural Development)	Minister of Fisheries and Forestry; April 1, 1969 – June 11, 1971	himself (Environment)
Hédard Robichaud	Minister of Fisheries; July 6, 1968 – April 1, 1969	himself (Fisheries and Forestry)
