= Jim Hewitt =

Canadian politician

Member of the British Columbia Legislative Assembly for Boundary-Similkameen
- In office December 11, 1975 – December 10, 1987 Serving with Ivan Messmer (1986-1987)
- Preceded by: Frank Richter, Jr.
- Succeeded by: Bill Barlee

Personal details
- Born: January 28, 1933 (age 93) Toronto, Ontario, Canada
- Party: Social Credit
- Spouse(s): Sheila Hewitt (div. 1980) Dorothy Merle Barber (m. 1980; died 2021)

James J. Hewitt (born January 28, 1933) is a retired Canadian politician who represented the riding of Boundary-Similkameen in the Legislative Assembly of British Columbia from 1975 to 1987. A member of the Social Credit Party, he held several ministerial roles in the Executive Council of British Columbia under premiers Bill Bennett and Bill Vander Zalm.

== Biography ==
Hewitt was born and raised in Toronto, then moved to Vancouver in 1962 where he attained his accounting designation. He settled in the Okanagan in 1967, and worked as a manager at the Penticton and District Credit Union; he was elected Penticton alderman in 1969.

He ran as a Social Credit candidate in the 1975 provincial election, and was elected member of the Legislative Assembly (MLA) for Boundary-Similkameen. Initially without a cabinet post, he was named Minister of Agriculture in October 1976 by Premier Bill Bennett, then served as Minister of Energy, Mines and Petroleum Resources from December 1978 to November 1979. After winning re-election in May 1979, he regained the agriculture portfolio, which was re-titled to Minister of Agriculture and Food in August 1980. He was re-assigned as Minister of Consumer and Corporate Affairs in August 1982, and kept that post following his re-election in 1983 before becoming Minister of Education in February 1986.

Hewitt was named Minister of Agriculture and Fisheries after Bill Vander Zalm became premier in August 1986. Boundary-Similkameen became a two-member district in that October's election; Hewitt was re-elected there alongside Ivan Messmer. He was not given a cabinet position, and resigned as MLA in December 1987 over disagreements with Vander Zalm; he subsequently served seven years as chairman of the Farm Credit Corporation. Although retired from elected politics, Hewitt actively campaigned against the province's 2009 electoral reform referendum.

He met Dorothy Barber when she worked on his campaign in 1979; they were married in 1980. He has four children with his first wife Sheila.

Political offices
Preceded by himself	Minister of Agriculture and Fisheries of British Columbia; August 14, 1986 – November 6, 1986	Succeeded by John Savage
Preceded by Thomas Waterland	Minister of Agriculture and Food of British Columbia; August 7, 1986 – August 14, 1986	Succeeded by himself
Preceded by Jack Heinrich	Minister of Education of British Columbia; February 11, 1986 – August 14, 1986	Succeeded by Anthony Brummet
Preceded by Peter Hyndman	Minister of Consumer and Corporate Affairs of British Columbia; August 10, 1982 – February 11, 1986	Succeeded by Elwood Veitch
Preceded by Cyril Morley Shelford	Minister of Agriculture and Food of British Columbia; Minister of Agriculture (1979-1980); June 5, 1979 – August 10, 1982	Succeeded by Harvey Schroeder
Preceded by Bill Bennett (Energy); James Chabot (Mines and Petroleum Resources)	Minister of Energy, Mines and Petroleum Resources of British Columbia; December 5, 1978 – November 24, 1979	Succeeded by Bob McClelland
Preceded by Don Phillips	Minister of Agriculture of British Columbia; October 29, 1976 – December 5, 1978	Succeeded by Cyril Morley Shelford
