= Johnson cabinet =

Johnson cabinet, Johnston cabinet or Johnson government may refer to:

== Canada ==
- Boss Johnson ministry, government of British Columbia from 1947 to 1952
- Johnston ministry, government of British Columbia in 1991

== United Kingdom ==
- Johnson cabinets, of Boris Johnson as Mayor of London (2008–2016)
- First Johnson ministry, the British minority government led by Boris Johnson from July to December 2019
- Second Johnson ministry, the British majority government led by Boris Johnson from 2019 to 2022

== United States ==
=== Presidencies ===
- Presidency of Andrew Johnson, 17th president of the United States, 1865–1869
- Presidency of Lyndon B. Johnson, 36th president of the United States, 1963–1969

=== Governorships ===
- Governorship of Gary Johnson, 29th governor of New Mexico, 1995–2002
