= Hugh Austin Curtis =

Canadian politician (1932–2014)

Member of the British Columbia Legislative Assembly for Saanich and the Islands
- In office August 30, 1972 – October 22, 1986
- Preceded by: John Douglas Tisdalle
- Succeeded by: Mel Couvelier; Terry Huberts

Provincial Secretary and Minister of Government Services of British Columbia
- In office August 14, 1986 – November 6, 1986
- Premier: Bill Vander Zalm
- Preceded by: Grace McCarthy
- Succeeded by: Elwood Veitch
- In office December 5, 1978 – November 24, 1979
- Premier: Bill Bennett
- Preceded by: Grace McCarthy
- Succeeded by: Evan Maurice Wolfe

Minister of Finance of British Columbia
- In office November 24, 1979 – August 14, 1986
- Premier: Bill Bennett; Bill Vander Zalm
- Preceded by: Evan Maurice Wolfe
- Succeeded by: Bill Vander Zalm

Minister of Municipal Affairs and Housing of British Columbia
- In office December 22, 1975 – December 5, 1978
- Premier: Bill Bennett
- Preceded by: Lorne Nicolson (Housing); James Gibson Lorimer (Municipal Affairs)
- Succeeded by: Bill Vander Zalm

Reeve/Mayor of Saanich
- In office 1964–1973
- Preceded by: Stanley Murphy
- Succeeded by: Edward Lum

Personal details
- Born: October 3, 1932 Victoria, British Columbia
- Died: May 27, 2014 (aged 81) Victoria, British Columbia
- Party: Social Credit; Progressive Conservative (1972-1974)
- Spouse: Sheila Diane Harford (m. 1957; died 2009)
- Children: Gary, Dave, Susan

Hugh Austin Curtis (October 3, 1932 – May 27, 2014) was a Canadian politician who represented Saanich and the Islands in the Legislative Assembly of British Columbia from 1972 to 1986. Initially a Progressive Conservative member, he joined the Social Credit Party in 1974, and served in the cabinets of premiers Bill Bennett and Bill Vander Zalm. Prior to entering provincial politics, he served as municipal councillor and mayor of Saanich.

== Biography ==
He was born in Victoria, British Columbia, the son of Austin Ivor Curtis and Helen Shepherd; his father served on the Victoria City Council and the school board. He was educated at Victoria High School, then worked as an announcer at radio station CJVI for 15 years. He later moved to CFAX, where he handled roles including newscaster and sales manager, and at one point held a minority stake in the station. He married Sheila Diane Halford in 1957; they had three children together.

Curtis was elected to the Saanich municipal council in 1961, then served as reeve from 1964 to 1973 (the position was re-titled mayor in 1968). During that time, he oversaw the acquisition of parklands and establishment of three recreation centres. He also served as the first chair of the Capital Regional District.

He ran as a Progressive Conservative candidate in the 1972 provincial election, and was elected member of the Legislative Assembly for Saanich and the Islands. He crossed the floor to join the Social Credit Party (Socred) in 1974, and was re-elected in the 1975, 1979 and 1983 elections. With the Socreds returning to power in 1975, Curtis was appointed to the provincial cabinet by Premier Bill Bennett as Minister of Municipal Affairs and Housing, then became Provincial Secretary and Minister of Government Services in December 1978. He was re-assigned as Minister of Finance in November 1979, and served in that role for the remainder of the Bennett ministry. After Bill Vander Zalm became premier in 1986, Curtis was moved back to his previous portfolio of Provincial Secretary and Government Services; he did not run again in that year's election.

He was awarded the Freeman of Saanich distinction in 2002. He died of cancer on May 27, 2014, at Royal Jubilee Hospital in Victoria.
