= Jim Nielsen (Canadian politician) =

Canadian politician and broadcaster (1938-2018)

James Arthur Nielsen

Member of the British Columbia Legislative Assembly for Richmond
- In office December 11, 1975 – October 22, 1986
- Preceded by: Harold Steves
- Succeeded by: Nick Loenen; Bill Vander Zalm

Personal details
- Born: August 6, 1938 Moose Jaw, Saskatchewan, Canada
- Died: April 4, 2018 (aged 79) New Westminster, British Columbia, Canada
- Party: BC Social Credit
- Other political affiliations: Progressive Conservative (federal)
- Spouse: Jean Nielsen
- Occupation: Broadcaster

James Arthur Nielsen (August 6, 1938 – April 4, 2018) was a Canadian politician and broadcaster. He served in the Legislative Assembly of British Columbia from 1975 to 1986 as a Social Credit (Socred) member for the constituency of Richmond, and was a cabinet minister under premiers Bill Bennett and Bill Vander Zalm.

== Early life and career ==
Born in Moose Jaw, Saskatchewan, Nielsen moved to Richmond, British Columbia as a high school student. He began his broadcasting career in 1959 as an announcer at Victoria's CJVI, then joined Vancouver's CJOR in 1960 as morning news presenter, and subsequently served as news director and morning news host at CFUN Vancouver and CFAX Victoria.

He and his wife Jean had eight children together.

== Politics ==
He first ran for public office in the 1974 federal election as a Progressive Conservative candidate in the riding of Burnaby—Seymour, but lost to Liberal Marke Raines. He then contested the 1975 British Columbia general election as a Social Credit candidate, and defeated the incumbent New Democrat Harold Steves to be elected member of the Legislative Assembly (MLA) for Richmond. Nielsen and Steves faced each other again in the 1979 and 1983 provincial elections, with Nielsen winning each time to stay on as Richmond MLA.

Nielsen was named to Premier Bill Bennett's cabinet in December 1975 as the province's first Minister of Environment, then swapped portfolios with Rafe Mair in December 1978 to become Minister of Consumer and Corporate Affairs. He was re-assigned as Minister of Health in January 1981, then became Minister of Human Resources in February 1986; he additionally regained the health portfolio in April 1986 following the resignation of Stephen Rogers.

With Bennett departing as Socred leader, Nielsen announced in June 1986 that he would join the leadership race. At the July leadership convention, he finished in last place with 30 votes after the second ballot. After Bill Vander Zalm took over as premier that August, Nielsen initially stayed on as both ministers of health and human resources, then lost the latter portfolio a few days later upon its abolition. He announced in September 1986 that he would not contest the upcoming provincial election, and encouraged Vander Zalm (who did not have a seat in the legislature at the time) to run for one of the two seats in his Richmond riding.

== Later life and death ==
After leaving office he chaired the Workers Compensation Board of British Columbia from 1987 to 1989. He also served as political commentator on CBC Radio One's The Early Edition, and wrote columns for various publications. He was a municipal councillor in Peachland from 1999 to 2002, and from 2005 to 2008.

He died at Royal Columbian Hospital in New Westminster on April 4, 2018, at the age of 79.

Political offices
Preceded by Stephen Rogers	Minister of Health of British Columbia; April 3, 1986 – November 6, 1986	Succeeded by Peter Albert Dueck
Preceded by Grace McCarthy	Minister of Human Resources of British Columbia; February 11, 1986 – August 14, 1986	Succeeded by Position abolished
Preceded by Rafe Mair	Minister of Health of British Columbia; January 6, 1981 – February 11, 1986	Succeeded by Stephen Rogers
Preceded by Rafe Mair	Minister of Consumer and Corporate Affairs of British Columbia; December 5, 1978 – January 6, 1981	Succeeded by Peter Hyndman
Preceded by Bob Williams (Lands, Forests and Water Resources)	Minister of Environment of British Columbia; December 22, 1975 – December 5, 1978	Succeeded by Rafe Mair
