= Ministry of Public Safety and Solicitor General (British Columbia) =

British Columbia government agency

Department overview
- Type: responsible for public safety and consumer protection
- Jurisdiction: British Columbia
- Headquarters: Victoria, British Columbia
- Minister responsible: Jessy Sahota
- Deputy Minister responsible: TBD
- Website: www2.gov.bc.ca/gov/content/governments/organizational-structure/ministries-organizations/ministries/public-safety-solicitor-general

The Ministry of Public Safety and Solicitor General (PSSG) is a provincial government department in the Canadian province of British Columbia. Its primary responsibilities are overseeing the province's policing and correction services, as well as consumer protection.

The current minister is Jessy Sahota, since 2026.

== History ==
The ministry was first established, as the Ministry of Solicitor General, on July 6, 1988, by the government of Premier Bill Vander Zalm. The solicitor general assumed responsibility for policing, the corrections system, the coroner's office, the Motor Vehicles Branch, Public Gaming Branch and the emergency program, all previously under the Attorney General of British Columbia. The creation was not without controversy; a week before the official announcement, Attorney General Brian Smith resigned from cabinet in protest, citing the planned split as a reason. Smith charged that the reason for the split was to weaken the attorney general's office and make it easier for the premier's office to control. In 1991, newly elected premier Mike Harcourt abolished the ministry and returned its responsibilities to the Ministry of Attorney General.

The ministry was re-created as the Ministry of Public Safety and Solicitor General on June 5, 2001, by Premier Gordon Campbell. In addition to regaining responsibility for policing, corrections, emergency management and gaming, the ministry gained responsibility for liquor control and licensing, the British Columbia Film Classification Office and landlord/tenant dispute resolution. On July 1, 2007, administration of the BCFCO was transferred to Consumer Protection BC.

On February 8, 2012, Premier Christy Clark merged the attorney general and solicitor general ministries to form a single Ministry of Justice and Attorney General. The move was part of an effort to reform and modernize the province's justice system. As part of the streamlining efforts, some of the duties of PSSG were not carried over to the justice ministry but transferred to other ministries: responsibility for the Public Sectors Employers Council and the Insurance Corporation of British Columbia were moved under the authority of the Ministry of Finance, and oversight of liquor and gaming went to the Ministry of Energy and Mines. Three years later, on December 12, 2015, Clark reversed course, restoring the Ministry of Public Safety and Solicitor General.

On December 7, 2022, Premier David Eby split emergency management into its own ministry, the Ministry of Emergency Management and Climate Readiness.

== Portfolio ==
The Ministry of Public Safety and Solicitor General is one of two ministries, alongside the Ministry of Attorney General, that is responsible for the Government of British Columbia's administration of justice, protection of rights and delivery of public safety services. The specific responsibilities of the PSSG has varied over the years, but has included: policing and law enforcement; correctional services; victim services; coroners services; road safety; regulation of the liquor, cannabis and gaming sectors; and co-ordination of the emergency management system (via Emergency Management BC).

PSSG is additionally responsible for several agencies and boards: Consumer Protection BC, the Insurance Corporation of British Columbia, the Vehicle Sales Authority of British Columbia and municipal police boards.

== List of ministers ==
List of ministers
Minister	Term start	Term end	Political party	Ministry
Solicitor General
Angus Ree	July 6, 1988	November 1, 1989	█ Social Credit	Vander Zalm
Russell Fraser	November 1, 1989	December 13, 1990	█ Social Credit	Vander Zalm
Ivan Messmer	December 13, 1990	April 2, 1991	█ Social Credit	Vander Zalm
Ivan Messmer	April 2, 1991	November 5, 1991	█ Social Credit	Johnston
Ministry disestablished 1991–2001; see Attorney General of British Columbia
Minister of Public Safety and Solicitor General
Rich Coleman	June 5, 2001	June 16, 2005	█ Liberal	Campbell
John Les	June 16, 2005	April 1, 2008	█ Liberal	Campbell
John van Dongen	April 1, 2008	April 27, 2009	█ Liberal	Campbell
Rich Coleman	April 27, 2009	June 10, 2009	█ Liberal	Campbell
Kash Heed	June 10, 2009	April 9, 2010	█ Liberal	Campbell
Mike de Jong	April 9, 2010	May 4, 2010	█ Liberal	Campbell
Kash Heed	May 4, 2010	May 5, 2010	█ Liberal	Campbell
Mike de Jong	May 5, 2010	October 25, 2010	█ Liberal	Campbell
Rich Coleman	October 25, 2010	March 14, 2011	█ Liberal	Campbell
Shirley Bond	March 14, 2011	February 8, 2012	█ Liberal	C. Clark
Ministry disestablished 2012–2015; see Attorney General of British Columbia
Mike Morris	December 11, 2015	July 18, 2017	█ Liberal	C. Clark
Mike Farnworth	July 18, 2017	November 18, 2022	█ New Democratic	Horgan
Mike Farnworth	December 7, 2022	November 18, 2024	█ New Democratic	Eby
Garry Begg	November 18, 2024	July 16, 2025	█ New Democratic	Eby
Nina Krieger	July 17, 2025	November 20, 2026	█ New Democratic	Eby
Jessy Sahota	November 20, 2026	Incumbent	█ Conservative	Doerkson

== See also ==
- Provincial correctional services in Canada § British Columbia
