= Saanich and the Islands =

Defunct provincial electoral district of British Columbia

Saanich and the Islands was a provincial electoral district in the Canadian province of British Columbia from 1966 to 1986. Most of the riding is now part of Saanich North and the Islands, while the southern part of the riding is now Saanich South.

For other current and historical ridings on Vancouver Island, please see Vancouver Island (electoral districts) or, for those in the area of Victoria, List of electoral districts in Greater Victoria.

== Electoral history ==
Note: Winners of each election are in bold.

28th British Columbia election, 1966
Party	Candidate	Votes	%	±	Expenditures
Liberal	James McGeer Campbell	3,401	23.52%		unknown
New Democratic	Edwin Wallace Haw	3,821	26.43%		unknown
Social Credit	**John Douglas Tidball Tisdalle**	**7,237**	**50.05%**	–	unknown
Total valid votes		14,459	100.00%		
Total rejected ballots		152			
Turnout		%			

29th British Columbia election, 1969
Party	Candidate	Votes	%	±	Expenditures
New Democratic	Donald Inge Johannessen	6,978	34.58%		unknown
Liberal	Louis Frederick Lindholm	3,312	16.41%		unknown
Social Credit	**John Douglas Tidball Tisdalle**	**9,888**	**49.00%**	–	unknown
Total valid votes		20,178	100.00%		
Total rejected ballots		136			
Turnout		63.19%			

30th British Columbia election, 1972
Party	Candidate	Votes	%	±	Expenditures
Liberal	Malcolm B. Anderson	3,581	15.25%		unknown
Independent	John Crawford McKenzie	49	0.21%		unknown
**Progressive Conservative**	**Hugh Austin Curtis**	**8,427**	**35.88%**		unknown
Social Credit	T. Foster Isherwood	5,894	25.09%	–	unknown
New Democratic	Eric Sherwood	5,536	23.57%		unknown
Total valid votes		23,487	100.00%		
Total rejected ballots		265			
Turnout		%			

31st British Columbia election, 1975
Party	Candidate	Votes	%	±	Expenditures
Progressive Conservative	Irene Rose Block	2,883	10.22%		unknown
Social Credit	**Hugh Austin Curtis**	**14,185**	**50.31%**	–	unknown
New Democratic	Carolyn Mae Pickup	10,048	35.64%		unknown
Liberal	Edgar Rudolf Rhomberg	1,079	3.83%		unknown
Total valid votes		28,195	100.00%		
Total rejected ballots		356			
Turnout		%			

32nd British Columbia election, 1979
Party	Candidate	Votes	%	±	Expenditures
Social Credit	**Hugh Austin Curtis**	**16,018**	**49.42%**	–	unknown
Progressive Conservative	John Willison Green	2,431	7.50%		unknown
New Democratic	John Mika	13,961	43.08%		unknown
Total valid votes		32,410	100.00%		
Total rejected ballots		419			
Total Registered Voters					
Turnout		%			

33rd British Columbia election, 1983
Party	Candidate	Votes	%	±	Expenditures
Independent	Douglas Hewson Christie	1,028	2.57%		unknown
Social Credit	**Hugh Austin Curtis**	**19,219**	**48.13%**	–	unknown
Progressive Conservative	John Willison Green	1,560	3.91%		unknown
Liberal	Mary Jane Lewis	780	1.95%		unknown
New Democratic	John Mika	17,347	43.44%		unknown
Total valid votes		39,934	100.00%		
Total rejected ballots		364			
Turnout		%			

34th British Columbia election, 1986 ^{1}
Party	Candidate	Votes	%	±	Expenditures
Social Credit	**Mel Couvelier**	**20,658**	**25.42%**	–	unknown
Social Credit	**Terry Huberts**	**20,517**	**25.24%**	–	unknown
New Democratic	Carolyn Mae Pickup	17,193	21.15%		unknown
Liberal	Clive Tanner	5,884	7.24%		unknown
New Democratic	David Herbert Vickers	17,024	20.95%		unknown
Total valid votes		81,276	100.00%		
Total rejected ballots		585			
Turnout		%			
^{1} Seat increased to two members from one.

After the 1986 election the riding was redistributed due to population growth in Saanich. The successor ridings are:

Saanich North and the Islands (1991–present) Saanich South (1991—present)
