= Russell Fraser =

Canadian politician and engineer (1934–2024)

Russell Gordon Fraser

Member of the British Columbia Legislative Assembly for Vancouver South
- In office May 5, 1983 – October 17, 1991 Serving with Stephen Rogers
- Preceded by: Peter Hyndman
- Succeeded by: Riding abolished

Attorney general of British Columbia
- In office July 13, 1990 – November 5, 1991
- Premier: Bill Vander Zalm; Rita Johnston
- Preceded by: Bud Smith
- Succeeded by: Colin Gabelmann

Solicitor general of British Columbia
- In office November 1, 1989 – December 13, 1990
- Premier: Bill Vander Zalm
- Preceded by: Angus Ree
- Succeeded by: Ivan Messmer

Minister of Post-Secondary Education of British Columbia
- In office February 11, 1986 – November 6, 1986
- Premier: Bill Bennett; Bill Vander Zalm
- Preceded by: Pat McGeer (Universities, Science and Communications)
- Succeeded by: Stan Hagen (Continuing Education and Job Training)

Personal details
- Born: March 1, 1934 Vancouver, British Columbia, Canada
- Died: May 23, 2024 (aged 90)
- Party: British Columbia Social Credit Party
- Spouse: Jone Fraser
- Education: University of British Columbia
- Profession: Engineer

Russell Gordon Fraser (March 1, 1934 – May 23, 2024) was a Canadian politician and engineer who represented the constituency of Vancouver South in the Legislative Assembly of British Columbia from 1983 to 1991. A member of the British Columbia Social Credit Party (Socred) caucus, he served as cabinet minister under premiers Bill Bennett, Bill Vander Zalm and Rita Johnston.

== Biography ==
Born in Vancouver, Fraser graduated from the University of British Columbia in 1958 with a Bachelor of Applied Science degree, and served as president of the Association of Professional Engineers of British Columbia in 1979. He was a commissioner on the Vancouver Park Board from 1976 to 1982, serving as chair from 1980 to 1981.

He ran in the 1983 provincial election as a Social Credit candidate in Vancouver South, and was elected as one of two members of the legislative assembly (MLA) for the riding alongside Stephen Rogers. Initially a backbencher, he was named to Premier Bill Bennett's cabinet in February 1986 as Minister of Post-Secondary Education, and retained that role after Bill Vander Zalm took over as premier that August.

He was re-elected MLA in the October 1986 election, but was dropped from Vander Zalm's cabinet that November in favour of Stan Hagen. He returned to the cabinet in November 1989 as Solicitor General, and additionally became Attorney General in July 1990 following the resignation of Bud Smith; he stayed on as Solicitor General until that December.

After Vander Zalm's resignation in April 1991, he was considered for interim leader of the party (and thus premier), but lost the caucus vote on the fourth ballot to Rita Johnston by 21–17; he remained as Attorney General in Johnston's cabinet. With the riding of Vancouver South being dissolved ahead of the October 1991 election, Fraser ran for re-election in the newly established constituency of Vancouver-Langara, but finished in third place as part of the Socreds' electoral collapse.

Fraser died on May 23, 2024, at the age of 90.

== Electoral record ==
1991 British Columbia general election: Vancouver-Langara
Party	Candidate	Votes	%	Expenditures
Liberal	Val Anderson	7,241	36.95	$13,737
New Democratic	Peter M. Kendall	6,774	34.57	$25,805
Social Credit	Russell G. Fraser	5,374	27.42	$50,387
Green	Kamala J. Todd	134	0.88	$32
Conservative	Malcolm A. Weatherston	75	0.38	
Total valid votes		19,598	100.00	
Total rejected ballots		373	1.87	
Turnout		19,971	72.64	
