= Prince George South =

Defunct provincial electoral district in British Columbia, Canada

Prince George South was a provincial electoral district of British Columbia, Canada, beginning with the election of 1979. It was created from Fort George and a small part of Cariboo. It was abolished prior to the 1991 election into Prince George-Mount Robson and Prince George-Omineca.

== See also ==
- List of British Columbia provincial electoral districts
- Canadian provincial electoral districts
