= Dave Parker (politician) =

Canadian politician (born 1940)

Member of the British Columbia Legislative Assembly for Skeena
- In office October 22, 1986 – October 17, 1991
- Preceded by: Frank Howard
- Succeeded by: Helmut Giesbrecht

Personal details
- Born: July 5, 1940 Halifax, Nova Scotia
- Died: November 9, 2025 (aged 85) Vernon, British Columbia
- Party: Social Credit
- Profession: Forester

David Fletcher Hewlett Parker (July 5, 1940 – November 9, 2025) was a Canadian politician who served as a member of the Legislative Assembly of British Columbia (MLA) from 1986 to 1991. A member of the Social Credit Party he represented the riding of Skeena.

== Early life and career ==
Before entering politics he was a professional forester, he was elected as a school board trustee, serving in Golden from 1981 to 1983 and then in Terrace from 1985 to 1987. He was elected to the British Columbia Legislature as MLA for Skeena in October 1986.

He served as minister of forests, minister of Crown lands, minister of lands and parks, and minister of state for the North Coast Region in the Rita Johnston and Bill Vander Zalm governments.
