= John Jansen (politician) =

Canadian politician (1947–2026)

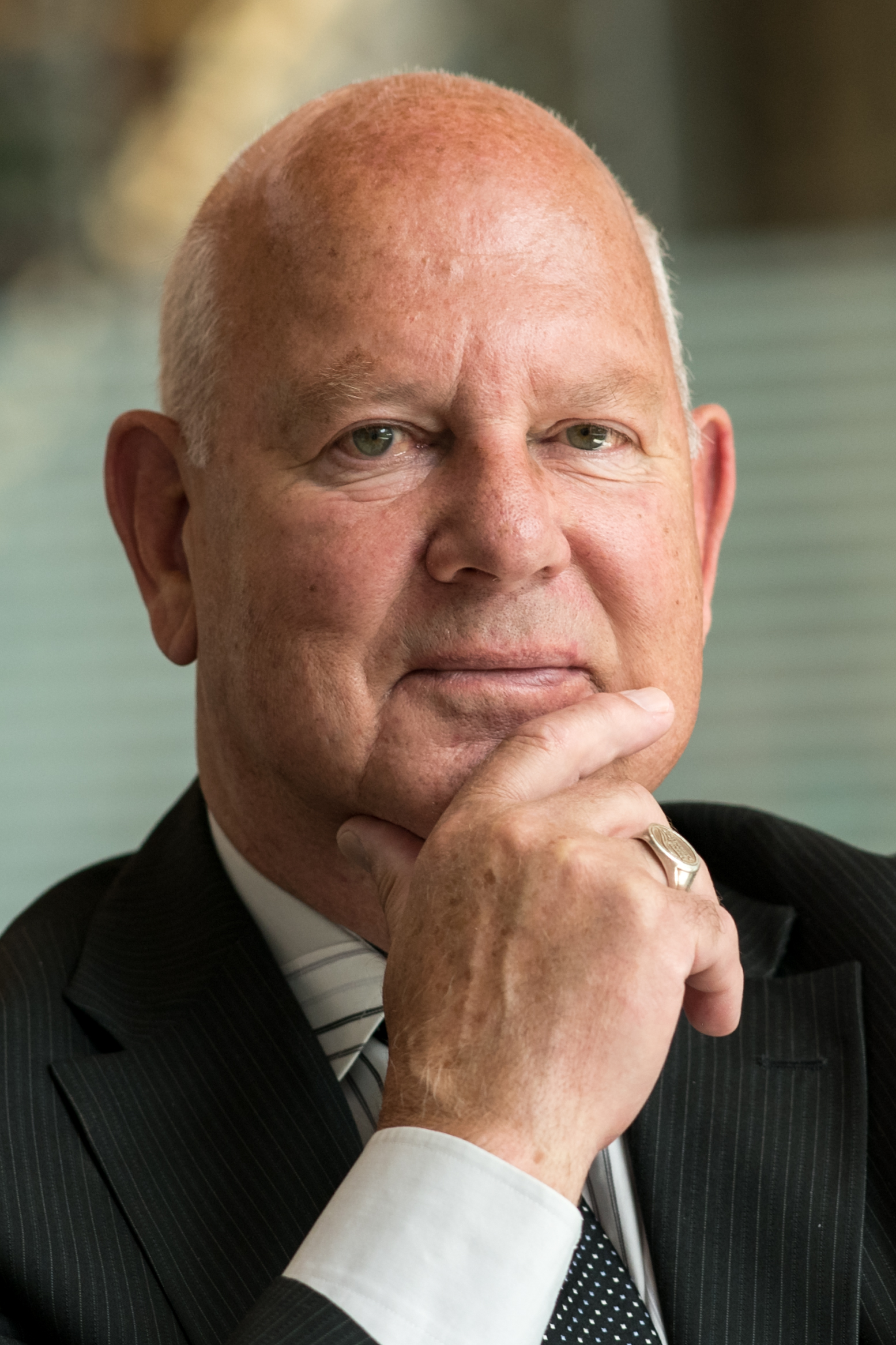
- Jansen in 2019

Member of the British Columbia Legislative Assembly for Chilliwack
- In office October 22, 1986 – October 17, 1991
- Preceded by: Harvey Schroeder
- Succeeded by: Bob Chisholm

Personal details
- Born: October 27, 1947 Wageningen, Netherlands
- Died: July 20, 2026 (aged 78)
- Party: Social Credit

John Jansen (October 27, 1947 – July 20, 2026) was a Canadian politician. He served in the Legislative Assembly of British Columbia from 1986 to 1991, as a Social Credit member for the constituency of Chilliwack.

== Life and career ==
Jansen served in the governments of Bill Vander Zalm and Rita Johnston, serving as Minister of Finance and Corporate Relations in the latter and as Minister of Health in the former. During his time in office, he also served as Minister of International Business and Immigration and as Minister Responsible for Seniors.

He served as Mayor of Chilliwack in the 1980s. He was the President of the Chilliwack Hospital Foundation.

Jansen died on July 20, 2026, at the age of 78.
