= Terry Huberts =

Canadian politician

Member of the British Columbia Legislative Assembly for Saanich and the Islands
- In office October 22, 1986 – October 7, 1991 Serving with Mel Couvelier
- Preceded by: Hugh Austin Curtis
- Succeeded by: Riding Abolished

Personal details
- Born: April 4, 1946 (age 80) Netherlands
- Party: Social Credit Party of British Columbia

Terry Huberts (born April 4, 1946) was a Canadian politician. He served in the Legislative Assembly of British Columbia from 1986 to 1991, as a Social Credit member for the constituency of Saanich and the Islands. From July 6, 1988 to November 1, 1989, Huberts served as Minister of Parks and Minister of State (Vancouver Island/Coast and North Coast).
