= Stephen Rogers (politician) =

Canadian politician

29th Speaker of the Legislative Assembly of British Columbia
- In office April 5, 1990 – October 16, 1991
- Preceded by: John Reynolds
- Succeeded by: Joan Sawicki

Member of the British Columbia Legislative Assembly for Vancouver South
- In office December 11, 1975 – October 17, 1991 Serving with William Strongman (1975-1979); Peter Hyndman (1979-1983); Russell Fraser (1983-1991)
- Preceded by: Jack Radford; Daisy Webster
- Succeeded by: Riding Abolished

Minister of Environment and Parks of British Columbia
- In office November 6, 1986 – March 3, 1987
- Premier: Bill Vander Zalm
- Preceded by: Forbes Charles Austin Pelton
- Succeeded by: William Bruce Strachan

Minister of Intergovernmental Relations of British Columbia
- In office March 3 – November 13, 1987
- Premier: Bill Vander Zalm
- Preceded by: William Bruce Strachan

Minister of State, Nechako of British Columbia
- In office October 22, 1987 – July 6, 1988
- Premier: Bill Vander Zalm

Minister of Transportation and Highways of British Columbia
- In office November 13, 1987 – July 6, 1988
- Premier: Bill Vander Zalm
- Preceded by: Clifford Charles Michael
- Succeeded by: Thomas Neil Vant

Personal details
- Born: March 28, 1942 (age 83) Vancouver, British Columbia
- Party: Social Credit
- Occupation: Pilot

Charles Stephen Rogers (born March 28, 1942) is a former British Columbia politician who served as the member of the Legislative Assembly of British Columbia (MLA) for the riding of Vancouver South from 1975 to 1991. Rogers ran for the leadership of the British Columbia Social Credit Party in the 1986 leadership race, but lost to Bill Vander Zalm.

== Early life and family ==
Rogers was born in Vancouver, British Columbia, the son of Forrest Rogers and Gwynneth Thomas, and was educated in Vernon and Vancouver. In 1967, Rogers married Margaret Wallace. He married his second wife Valerie Richards in 1991. Stephen has four children—two from both marriages.

== Career ==
Rogers was elected as a Social Credit MLA in Vancouver South in 1975, 1979, 1983 and 1986. His career culminated in serving as Speaker until 1991 when he returned to his career as an airline pilot with Air Canada. He retired from Air Canada in 2002.

Rogers was forced to resign from the position of Minister of Energy, Mines and Petroleum Resources in 1986 after it was disclosed that he was in a conflict of interest position involving a personal tax shelter investment. He resigned as Minister of Health later that same year just before he was charged with failure to disclose financial holdings as required by law. In 1987, Rogers resigned as Minister of the Environment following conflict of interest allegations related to a change in boundaries for Strathcona Provincial Park.

He ran as the Conservative Party of Canada candidate for the riding of Vancouver Quadra in the 2004 election and again in 2006, losing both times to Liberal Stephen Owen.

Rogers is a lifelong resident of Vancouver.
