= Austin Pelton =

Canadian politician

Member of the British Columbia Legislative Assembly for Dewdney
- In office May 5, 1983 – October 17, 1991 Serving with Norm Jacobsen (1986–1991)
- Preceded by: George Mussallem
- Succeeded by: Riding Abolished

Personal details
- Born: March 19, 1920 Vancouver, British Columbia
- Died: February 19, 2003 (aged 82) Maple Ridge, British Columbia
- Party: British Columbia Social Credit Party

Military service
- Allegiance: Canada
- Branch/service: Royal Canadian Air Force
- Years of service: 1941–1970
- Rank: Lieutenant-Colonel

Forbes Charles Austin Pelton (March 19, 1920 – February 19, 2003) was a political figure in British Columbia. He represented Dewdney in the Legislative Assembly of British Columbia from 1983 to 1991 as a Social Credit member.

He was born in Vancouver, British Columbia, the son of Forbes Buel Pelton and Kathleen Francis Austin, and was educated in Burnaby and at Western University. In 1942, he married Louise Ratcliffe. Pelton was an alderman for Maple Ridge, also serving as mayor. He was a big band singer and pianist in the late thirties.

From 1941 to 1970, he served in the Royal Canadian Air Force and Canadian Air Force and retired as a Wing Commander (Lieutenant Colonel). Pelton was a member of the provincial cabinet in 1985 and 1986, holding the position of Minister of the Environment. He subsequently served as the deputy speaker of the legislative assembly.
