= Jack Joseph Kempf =

Canadian politician from British Columbia (1935–2003)

Jack Kempf

Member of the British Columbia Legislative Assembly for Omineca
- In office December 11, 1975 – October 17, 1991
- Preceded by: Douglas Tynwald Kelly
- Succeeded by: Len Fox

Personal details
- Born: May 12, 1935 Kelowna, British Columbia, Canada
- Died: July 1, 2003 (aged 68) Loreto, Baja California Sur, Mexico
- Party: Social Credit

Jack Joseph Kempf (May 12, 1935 – July 1, 2003) was a business owner and politician in British Columbia. He represented Omineca in the Legislative Assembly of British Columbia from 1975 to 1991 as a Social Credit member. He was defeated in the 1991 provincial election when he sought a fifth term as an independent.

He was born in Kelowna, British Columbia, the son of Steve Kempf and Katherine Klein. Kempf was a motel and restaurant owner. He served on the municipal council for Houston, British Columbia and also served as mayor. Kempf served in the provincial cabinet, first as Minister of Lands, Parks and Housing, and then as Minister of Forests and Lands.

Kempf died in Loreto, Baja California Sur, Mexico, where he had lived in retirement.
