= John Savage (British Columbia politician) =

Canadian politician

John Lawrence Savage

Member of the British Columbia Legislative Assembly for Delta
- In office October 22, 1986 – October 17, 1991 Serving with Kenneth Walter Davidson
- Preceded by: Kenneth Walter Davidson
- Succeeded by: Fred Gingell

Personal details
- Born: February 23, 1936 Qualicum Beach, British Columbia
- Died: October 20, 2018 (aged 82) Delta, British Columbia
- Party: Social Credit

John Lawrence Savage (February 23, 1936 – October 20, 2018) was a Canadian politician. He served in the Legislative Assembly of British Columbia from 1986 to 1991, as a Social Credit member for the constituency of Delta. He served in the cabinet as Minister of Agriculture and Fisheries, Minister of Parks, and Minister of Native Affairs.
