= Bruce Strachan =

Canadian politician

William Bruce Strachan

Member of the British Columbia Legislative Assembly for Prince George South
- In office May 10, 1979 – October 17, 1991
- Preceded by: Riding Established
- Succeeded by: Riding Abolished

Personal details
- Born: July 22, 1941 (age 85) Winnipeg, Manitoba
- Party: Social Credit

William Bruce Strachan (Bruce Strachan) (born July 22, 1941) is a former politician in the Canadian province of British Columbia. Strachan was a school trustee and board chair, a regional district director, as well as a three-term MLA and cabinet minister. He served in the Legislative Assembly of British Columbia from 1979 to 1991, as a Social Credit member for the constituency of Prince George South.

After working as a professional musician in the United States of America, Strachan and his wife moved to Prince George, British Columbia in 1966 he and enrolled as an adult student at the College of New Caledonia. After graduating, he became an Information Officer for the college.

== Political career ==
In 1976, he was elected to the local school board where he later became the board chair. In 1979, he won his first provincial election campaign in the new constituency of Prince George South.

In 1988, as Minister of State for the Cariboo, he secured $100,000 for an initial feasibility study for the creation of the University of Northern British Columbia (UNBC). In 1990, as Minister of Advanced Education and Job Training, Strachan approved a $138 million budget to create the new campus for UNBC. Aside from these two cabinet portfolios, Strachan also served at various times as deputy speaker of the Legislature, Minister of Intergovernmental Affairs, Minister of Environment, Minister of Science and Technology, Minister Responsible for Youth, Minister of Health and Minister Responsible for Senior Citizens.

After provincial politics, he was elected to Prince George City Council as a city councillor and served as a director for the Regional District of Fraser-Fort George.

In 2009, he was a director of the No BC-STV Campaign Society that advocated for a No vote in the referendum about a new Single Transferable Vote ballot system in the province.
