= Jack Heinrich =

Canadian politician (1936–2025)

Jack Heinrich KC

Member of the British Columbia Legislative Assembly for Prince George North
- In office May 10, 1979 – October 22, 1986
- Preceded by: Riding established
- Succeeded by: Lois Boone

Personal details
- Born: December 20, 1936 Mission, British Columbia, Canada
- Died: October 21, 2025 (aged 88) Calgary, Alberta, Canada
- Party: British Columbia Social Credit Party

John Herbert Heinrich, KC (December 20, 1936 – October 21, 2025) was a Canadian commercial and real estate lawyer and political figure in British Columbia. He represented Prince George North in the Legislative Assembly of British Columbia from 1979 to 1986 as a Social Credit member.

== Life and career ==
Heinrich was born on December 20, 1936 in Mission, British Columbia, and was educated there and at the University of British Columbia. In 1962, he married Linda Strachan. Heinrich lived in Prince George. He served in the provincial cabinet as Minister of Labour, Minister of Municipal Affairs, Minister of Education and Minister of Forests. In 1986, he was named Queen's Counsel (QC). Heinrich died in Calgary, Alberta on October 21, 2025, at the age of 88.
