= Norman Jacobsen (politician) =

Canadian politician (1930–2019)

Norm Jacobsen

Member of the British Columbia Legislative Assembly for Dewdney
- In office October 22, 1986 – October 17, 1991 Serving with Austin Pelton
- Preceded by: Austin Pelton
- Succeeded by: Riding Abolished

Personal details
- Born: Johann Alvin Normand Jacobsen; April 17, 1930 New Westminster, British Columbia
- Died: April 17, 2019 (aged 89) Maple Ridge, British Columbia
- Party: British Columbia Social Credit Party
- Occupation: Logging

Johann Alvin Normand Jacobsen (April 17, 1930 – April 17, 2019) was a logging company owner and political figure in British Columbia. He represented Dewdney in the Legislative Assembly of British Columbia from 1986 to 1991 as a Social Credit member.

He was born in New Westminster, British Columbia in 1930, the son of Johannes Jacobsen and Elida Ericsen, and was educated in Mission.

He was mayor of Maple Ridge from 1976 to 1981. Jacobsen served in the provincial cabinet as Minister of Labour and Consumer Services (1989 to 1990) and as Minister of Social Services and Housing (1990 to 1991 and then again for a second stint later in 1991). He ran for the leadership of the Social Credit Party in 1991. He died on April 17, 2019, his 89th birthday.
