= Neil Vant =

Canadian politician

The Reverend Thomas Neil Vant

Member of the British Columbia Legislative Assembly for Cariboo
- In office October 22, 1986 – October 17, 1991 Serving with Alex Fraser (1986-1989); David Zirnhelt (1989-1991)
- Preceded by: Alex Fraser
- Succeeded by: Riding Abolished

Personal details
- Born: July 11, 1944 (age 81) Nelson, British Columbia
- Party: Social Credit
- Occupation: Clergyman, Prospector

Thomas Neil Vant (born July 11, 1944) is an Anglican clergyman, prospector, businessman and former political figure in British Columbia. He represented Cariboo from 1986 to 1991 in the Legislative Assembly of British Columbia as a Social Credit member.

He was born in Nelson, British Columbia, the son of Thomas E. Vant and Helen Isabel Simpson, and was educated in Quesnel, at the B.C. Vocational School, at the University of British Columbia and at the Vancouver School of Theology. In 1970, he married Jeanne Stanton Parmucker. In 1988 and 1989, Vant served in the provincial cabinet as Minister of Transportation and Highways.
