= Mel Couvelier =

Canadian politician (1931–2011)

Member of the British Columbia Legislative Assembly for Saanich and the Islands
- In office October 22, 1986 – October 17, 1991 Serving with Terry Huberts
- Preceded by: Hugh Austin Curtis
- Succeeded by: Riding Abolished

Personal details
- Born: January 20, 1931 Vancouver, British Columbia
- Died: May 30, 2011 (aged 80) Saanich, British Columbia
- Party: Social Credit
- Spouse: Milly Quakenbush
- Occupation: Businessman

Melville Bertram Couvelier (January 20, 1931 – May 30, 2011) was a businessman and political figure in British Columbia. He represented Saanich and the Islands from 1986 to 1991 in the Legislative Assembly of British Columbia as a Social Credit member.

He was born in Vancouver, British Columbia. In 1948, Couvelier married Milly Quakenbush. He was employed by Crown Zellerbach, a paper manufacturing company, then went on to operate a general store in Coal Harbour. In 1960, the family moved to Victoria. There, he became the owner of Maplewood Poultry Processors and later established Couvelier's Fine Apparel. He ran unsuccessfully in the 1969 and 1972 provincial elections. He was mayor of Saanich from 1977 to 1986.

In 1986, he ran for the leadership of the Social Credit Party; he placed 11th out of 12 candidates on the first ballot, and withdrew, endorsing eventual winner Bill Vander Zalm. Couvelier then ran in the 1986 election for the riding of Saanich and the Islands, and was elected. He was subsequently named to Vander Zalm's cabinet as minister of finance. He remained in the post until March 6, 1991, when he quit because he "couldn't sit beside" Vander Zalm while the latter was under investigation for conflict-of-interest.

After Vander Zalm's resignation later that year, Couvelier ran in the subsequent leadership election. Placing a distant third behind frontrunners Rita Johnston and Grace McCarthy, Couvelier became a "queenmaker". Despite previous animosity with Johnston, he backed her over McCarthy, leading to Johnston's victory.

Following Johnston's inauguration as premier, he was re-appointed minister of finance on April 8, 1991. One month later, on May 7, Couvelier was removed from cabinet. He was alleged to have breached the confidentially provisions of the Financial Institutions Act, leading Johnston to request his resignation. Couvelier complied, but was publicly defiant: denying the allegations, requesting Johnston release the review that persuaded her to fire him, and challenging her to "lay a charge, so I can defend myself in court." Couvelier had obtained his own legal advice that argued his innocence, and said he had a "suspicion of what drives this", which reporters took as a reference to leadership ambitions. Couvelier did not run for re-election in the 1991 provincial election.

In 2008, Couvelier was unsuccessful in a bid to become mayor of Sidney, British Columbia. He died in Saanich at the age of 80.
