= Howard Dirks =

Canadian politician (1938–2018)

Howard Leroy Dirks

Member of the British Columbia Legislative Assembly for Nelson-Creston
- In office October 22, 1986 – October 17, 1991
- Preceded by: Lorne Nicolson
- Succeeded by: Corky Evans

Personal details
- Born: August 7, 1938 Waldheim, Saskatchewan
- Died: October 26, 2018 (aged 80) Alberta, Canada
- Party: Social Credit Party of British Columbia
- Spouse: Lorna Mary Logan
- Education: University of Saskatchewan
- Profession: Oil Field Technologist, Restaurateur

Howard Leroy Dirks (August 7, 1938 – October 26, 2018) was an American oil field technologist, restaurant owner and political figure in British Columbia. After being defeated in the 1983 provincial election, he represented Nelson-Creston in the Legislative Assembly of British Columbia from 1986 to 1991 as a Social Credit member.

He was born in Waldheim, Saskatchewan and educated at the University of Saskatchewan. In 1961 Dirks married Lorna Mary Logan. He was an alderman for Nelson. Dirks served in the provincial cabinet as Provincial Secretary and as Minister of Development, Trade and Tourism. He was defeated by Corky Evans when he ran for reelection to the assembly in 1991 and 1996; in 1996, Dirks ran as a Liberal candidate.

Dirks died on October 26, 2018, at the age of 80.
