= Brian Smith (Canadian politician) =

Canadian politician (born 1934)

Brian Ray Douglas Smith KC OBC

Member of the British Columbia Legislative Assembly for Oak Bay-Gordon Head
- In office May 10, 1979 – November 15, 1989
- Preceded by: Riding Established
- Succeeded by: Elizabeth Cull

Attorney General of British Columbia
- In office May 26, 1983 – June 29, 1988
- Premier: Bill Bennett; Bill Vander Zalm
- Preceded by: Allan Williams
- Succeeded by: Bud Smith

Personal details
- Born: July 7, 1934 (age 91) Victoria, British Columbia, Canada
- Party: Social Credit

Brian Ray Douglas Smith (born July 7, 1934) is a Canadian politician and business executive. He served for a decade on Oak Bay municipal council and was mayor of Oak Bay from 1974 to 1979. Smith was first elected to the Legislative Assembly of British Columbia in the 1979 election to represent the riding of Oak Bay-Gordon Head for the Social Credit Party. He was re-elected in the 1983 and 1986 election.

== Life and career ==
In the Bill Bennett government, he served as Minister of Education and then Minister of Energy, Mines, and Petroleum Resources, and was appointed to the post of Attorney General on May 26, 1983.

In 1986, after Bennett's decision to step down, Smith was a candidate for the leadership of the Social Credit Party. In a field of twelve candidates, he finished second to Bill Vander Zalm, losing on the fourth ballot. When Vander Zalm appointed a new cabinet, Smith was retained as Attorney General.

On June 28, 1988, Smith resigned as Attorney General in dramatic fashion, during a speech to the Legislature. Smith charged that Vander Zalm did not adequately "appreciate the unique independence of the attorney general's ministry", citing the Toigo affair and abortion as instances of interference. He also disapproved of Vander Zalm's planned split of his ministry, believing it would weaken the ministry's independence and allow it to further fall under the control of the premier's office. Smith later told reporters that his resignation should not be seen as a challenge to Vander Zalm's leadership, and he remained a member of caucus. It was the first time an attorney general had resigned over differences from the premier since 1901, when Richard McBride resigned from James Dunsmuir's government; Smith made reference to McBride's resignation in his speech. When the ministry was indeed split a week later, creating the Ministry of Solicitor General, Smith further criticized the move as one that would slow decision-making and hamper the ability to fight crime.

On October 19, 1989, he announced that he was resigning his seat, effective November 15, 1989, and became chairman of CN Rail until 1994. He was the Chairman of BC Hydro from 1996 to 2001.

In 2016, Smith was appointed to the Order of BC as a "long-serving elected official who led social innovations in the arena of sports, education, law and business".
