= Rita Johnston =

Premier of British Columbia in 1991

Rita Margaret Johnston

29th Premier of British Columbia
- In office April 2, 1991 – November 5, 1991
- Monarch: Elizabeth II
- Lieutenant Governor: David Lam
- Preceded by: Bill Vander Zalm
- Succeeded by: Mike Harcourt

3rd Deputy Premier of British Columbia
- In office August 10, 1990 – April 2, 1991
- Premier: Bill Vander Zalm
- Preceded by: Grace McCarthy (1986)
- Succeeded by: Anita Hagen

Leader of the British Columbia Social Credit Party
- In office April 2, 1991 – March 7, 1992
- Preceded by: Bill Vander Zalm
- Succeeded by: Jack Weisgerber

Minister of Transportation and Highways of British Columbia
- In office November 1, 1989 – April 15, 1991
- Premier: Bill Vander Zalm
- Preceded by: Neil Vant
- Succeeded by: Lyall Hanson

Minister of Municipal Affairs, Recreation and Culture of British Columbia
- In office July 6, 1988 – November 1, 1989
- Premier: Bill Vander Zalm
- Preceded by: Herself (Municipal Affairs); William Earl Reid (Tourism, Recreation and Culture)
- Succeeded by: Lyall Hanson

Minister of State, Kootenay of British Columbia
- In office October 22, 1987 – July 6, 1988
- Premier: Bill Vander Zalm

Minister of Municipal Affairs of British Columbia Minister of Municipal Affairs and Transit (1986)
- In office August 14, 1986 – July 6, 1988
- Premier: Bill Vander Zalm
- Preceded by: Jack Heinrich
- Succeeded by: Herself (Municipal Affairs, Recreation and Culture)

Member of the British Columbia Legislative Assembly for Surrey-Newton Surrey (1983-1986)
- In office May 5, 1983 – October 17, 1991 Serving with William Earl Reid (1983-1986)
- Preceded by: Bill Vander Zalm; Ernest Hall
- Succeeded by: Penny Priddy

Personal details
- Born: Rita Margaret Leichert; April 22, 1935 (age 91) Melville, Saskatchewan, Canada
- Party: Social Credit Party (1983-?); BC Conservative (c. 2009-present)
- Spouse: George Johnston (m. 1951)
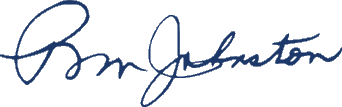
- Signature

Rita Margaret Johnston (née Leichert; born April 22, 1935) is a Canadian politician in British Columbia. Johnston became the first female premier in Canadian history when she succeeded Bill Vander Zalm in 1991 to become the 29th premier of British Columbia, serving for seven months. She was a member of the Legislative Assembly of British Columbia from 1983 to 1991, and served in the Vander Zalm ministry as part of the British Columbia Social Credit Party (Socred) caucus, including as deputy premier from 1990 to 1991.

== Early life and career ==
She was born in Melville, Saskatchewan to John Leichert and Annie Chyzzy, then moved to Vancouver where she received her education. She married George Johnston in 1951, and the couple ran a trailer park in Surrey, British Columbia. She first entered politics as a Surrey municipal councillor, serving from 1970 to 1975, and was elected to council again in 1978 and 1982.

== Provincial politics ==
She ran in the 1983 provincial election as part of the Social Credit Party, and was elected to the Legislative Assembly of British Columbia to represent the dual-member riding of Surrey alongside William Earl Reid. With Bill Bennett departing as Socred leader in 1986, Johnston announced she would support Bill Vander Zalm in the leadership race; she had previously served under Vander Zalm when she was a councillor and he was the mayor of Surrey. After Vander Zalm took over as premier that August, Johnston was named to his cabinet as minister of municipal affairs and transit.

She was re-elected in October 1986 in the newly created riding of Surrey-Newton, and her cabinet post was simplified to minister of municipal affairs; she additionally served as minister of state for the Kootenay Region beginning in October 1987. In a July 1988 cabinet shuffle, her portfolio was modified to municipal affairs, recreation and culture, while the role of minister of state for Kootenay was abolished. She was re-assigned as minister of transportation and highways in November 1989, and was named deputy premier in August 1990.

== Premier ==
When Vander Zalm resigned on April 2, 1991, caucus selected her as interim leader over attorney general Russell Fraser by a vote of 21–17. She was appointed premier the same day, making her Canada's first female first minister. At the Social Credit party convention in July 1991, she was formally elected leader of the Socreds in an upset, narrowly defeating the frontrunner Grace McCarthy.

Johnston had little time to implement any new programs since she faced a statutory general election later that year. She waited as long as she could, finally calling an election for October. However, her long association with the scandal-plagued Vander Zalm hampered her chances of winning in her own right. Her party was also bitterly divided from the leadership contest, and she had little time to repair the breach before the writs were dropped.

The Socreds were heavily defeated by New Democratic Party (NDP), led by Mike Harcourt. Moreover, many moderate Socreds switched their support to the previously moribund BC Liberals. The Socreds lost more than half of their popular vote from 1986 and were cut down to seven seats, falling to third place in the Legislative Assembly behind the NDP and Liberals; Johnston lost her own seat to the NDP's Penny Priddy by over 10 points. Harcourt later said that he preferred facing Johnston rather than McCarthy, believing McCarthy would have been a tougher opponent in a general election.

Johnston resigned as leader of the Social Credit Party on January 11, 1992, and was replaced by McCarthy. After her defeat, Johnston retired from politics and has had a low public profile. She returned to public life in 2009 as an advisor for the Conservative Party of British Columbia.
