= Anthony Brummet =

Canadian politician (1931–2024)

Member of the British Columbia Legislative Assembly for North Peace River
- In office May 10, 1979 – June 8, 1991
- Preceded by: Ed Smith
- Succeeded by: Richard Neufeld

Personal details
- Born: March 31, 1931 Mendham, Saskatchewan, Canada
- Died: June 8, 2024 (aged 93) Osoyoos, British Columbia, Canada
- Party: Social Credit
- Spouse(s): Audrey A. Smith (m. 1952; d. 1984); Lois (m. 1985)
- Occupation: Educator, Politician

Anthony Julius Brummet (March 31, 1931 – June 8, 2024) was a Canadian educator and politician in British Columbia. He represented North Peace River from 1979 to 1991 in the Legislative Assembly of British Columbia as a Social Credit member, serving in the provincial cabinet as Minister of Lands, Parks and Housing, as Minister of Environment, as Minister of Energy, Mines and Petroleum Resources, as Minister of State (Peace River) and as Minister of Education.

Born in Mendham, Saskatchewan in 1931, the son of Gordon F. Brummet and Maria Potter, Brummet was educated at the University of British Columbia. In 1952, he married Audrey A. Smith and lived in Fort St. John, British Columbia. In 1985, he married his second wife, Lois, after Audrey died of cancer the year before. He was a school principal before entering politics. Brummet died at his home in Osoyoos, British Columbia, on June 8, 2024, at the age of 93.
