= Cliff Michael =

Canadian politician

Member of the British Columbia Legislative Assembly for Shuswap-Revelstoke
- In office May 5, 1983 – October 17, 1991
- Preceded by: William Stewart King
- Succeeded by: Riding Abolished

Personal details
- Born: October 5, 1933 Lashburn, Saskatchewan
- Died: May 12, 2022 (aged 88)
- Party: Social Credit

Clifford C. Michael (October 5, 1933 – May 12, 2022) was a Canadian politician. He served in the Legislative Assembly of British Columbia from 1983 to 1991, as a Social Credit member for the constituency of Shuswap–Revelstoke. At various times he served as Minister of Transportation and Highways, Minister of Government Management Services, and Minister of Tourism.
