= Kim Campbell =

Prime Minister of Canada in 1993

The Right Honourable Kim Campbell PC CC OBC KC
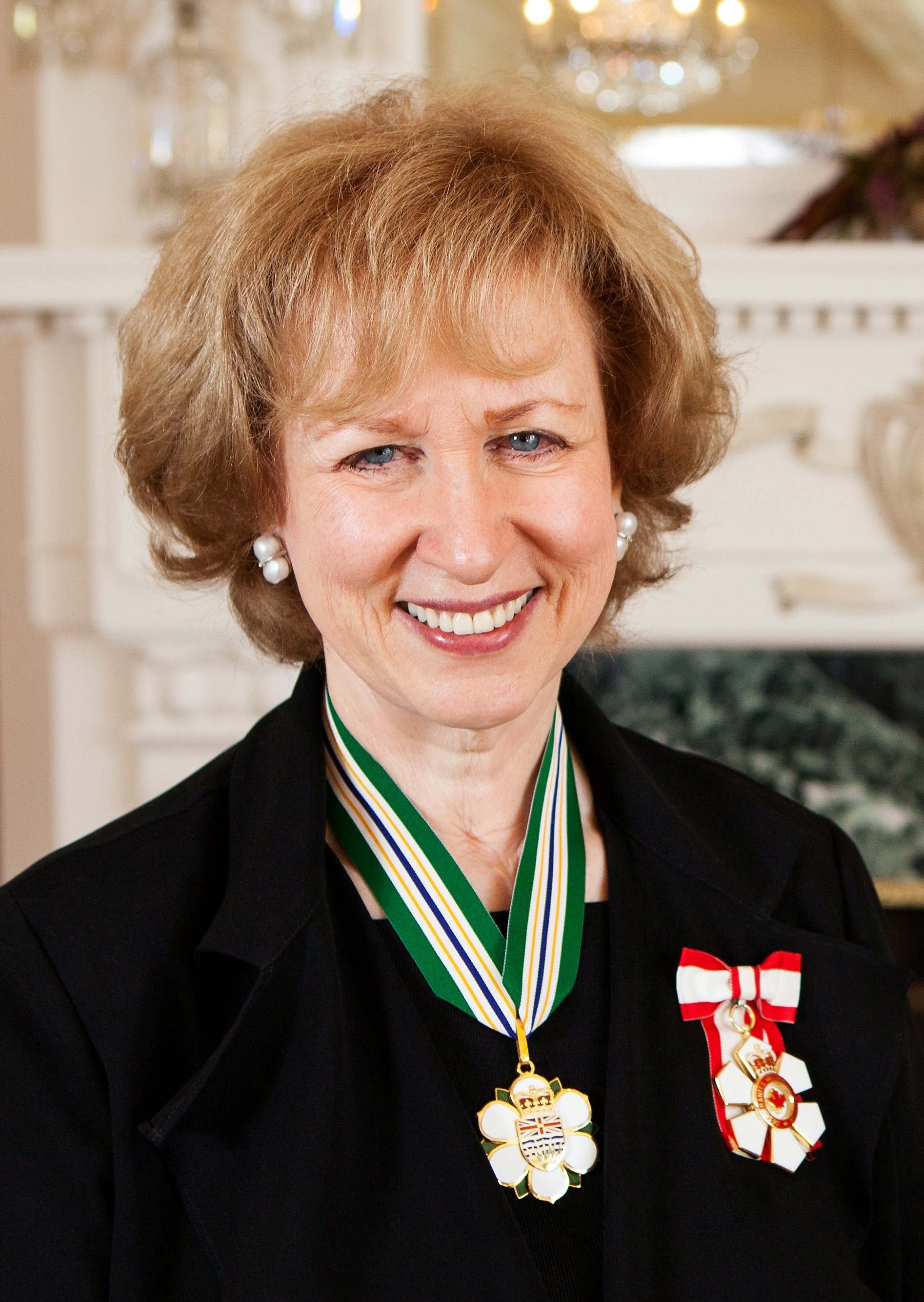
- Campbell in 2012

19th Prime Minister of Canada
- In office June 25 – November 4, 1993
- Monarch: Elizabeth II
- Governor General: Ray Hnatyshyn
- Deputy: Jean Charest
- Preceded by: Brian Mulroney
- Succeeded by: Jean Chrétien

Leader of the Progressive Conservative Party of Canada
- In office June 13 – December 14, 1993
- Preceded by: Brian Mulroney
- Succeeded by: Jean Charest

Minister of National Defence
- In office January 4 – June 25, 1993
- Prime Minister: Brian Mulroney
- Preceded by: Marcel Masse
- Succeeded by: Tom Siddon

Minister of Veterans Affairs
- In office January 4 – June 25, 1993
- Prime Minister: Brian Mulroney
- Preceded by: Gerald Merrithew
- Succeeded by: Peter McCreath

Minister of Justice and Attorney General
- In office February 23, 1990 – January 3, 1993
- Prime Minister: Brian Mulroney
- Preceded by: Doug Lewis
- Succeeded by: Pierre Blais

Minister of State (Indian Affairs and Northern Development)
- In office January 30, 1989 – February 22, 1990
- Prime Minister: Brian Mulroney
- Minister: Pierre Cadieux
- Preceded by: Bernard Valcourt
- Succeeded by: Shirley Martin

Member of Parliament for Vancouver Centre
- In office November 21, 1988 – October 25, 1993
- Preceded by: Pat Carney
- Succeeded by: Hedy Fry

Member of the British Columbia Legislative Assembly for Vancouver-Point Grey
- In office September 24, 1986 – November 21, 1988 Serving with Darlene Marzari
- Preceded by: Pat McGeer; Garde Gardom
- Succeeded by: Tom Perry

Personal details
- Born: Avril Phaedra Douglas Campbell; March 10, 1947 (age 79) Port Alberni, British Columbia, Canada
- Party: Independent (since 2003)
- Other political affiliations: NPA (1980–1986); BC Social Credit (1983–1988); Progressive Conservative (1988–2003)
- Spouses: Nathan Divinsky (m. 1972; div. 1983) Howard Eddy (m. 1986; div. 1993) Hershey Felder (m. 1997)
- Education: University of British Columbia (BA, LLB); London School of Economics
- Occupation: Politician; diplomat; lawyer; writer
- Website: https://kimcampbell.com/

Avril Phaedra Douglas "Kim" Campbell (born March 10, 1947) is a Canadian politician who was the 19th prime minister of Canada from June to November 1993. Campbell is the first and only female prime minister of Canada. Prior to becoming the final Progressive Conservative (PC) prime minister, she was also the first woman to serve as minister of justice in Canadian history and the first woman to become minister of defence in a NATO member state.

Campbell was first elected to the British Columbia Legislative Assembly as a member of the British Columbia Social Credit Party in 1986 before being elected to the House of Commons of Canada as a PC in 1988. Under Prime Minister Brian Mulroney, she held several cabinet positions, including minister of justice and attorney general, minister of veterans affairs, and minister of national defence from 1990 to 1993. Campbell became prime minister in June 1993 after winning the Progressive Conservative leadership election following Mulroney's resignation amid declining popularity. In the 1993 Canadian federal election in October of that year, the Progressive Conservatives lost all but two of their seats, having previously held a majority, and Campbell lost her own seat. Her 132-day premiership is the third-shortest in Canadian history. (Note: See List of prime ministers of Canada. The two prime ministers with shorter times in office were Charles Tupper in 1896 and John Turner in 1984. Arthur Meighen also served a shorter time in 1926, but his total time was longer including his first term in 1920–1921.)

Campbell was also the first baby boomer to hold the office, as well as the only prime minister born in British Columbia. She served as chair of the Canadian Supreme Court advisory board.

== Early life ==
Campbell was born in Port Alberni, British Columbia, the daughter of Phyllis "Lissa" Margaret (née Cook; 1923–2013) and George Thomas Campbell (1920–2002), a barrister who had served with the Seaforth Highlanders of Canada in Italy. Her father was born in Montreal to Scottish parents from Glasgow.

When she was a preteen, Campbell and her family moved to Vancouver. Campbell was one of five co-hosts and reporters on the CBC children's program Junior Television Club, which aired in May and June 1957.

Her mother left when Campbell was 12, leaving Kim and her sister Alix to be raised by their father. As a teenager, Campbell nicknamed herself Kim. In Vancouver, Campbell attended Prince of Wales Secondary School and was a top student. She became the school's first female student president and graduated in 1964.

== University and early career ==
Campbell earned an honours bachelor's degree in political science from the University of British Columbia, graduating in 1969. She was active in the student government and served as the first female president of the first-year class. She then completed a year of graduate study at the university to qualify for doctoral-level studies. Campbell entered the London School of Economics in 1970 to study towards her doctorate in Soviet government and spent three months touring the Soviet Union from April to June 1972. She had spent several years studying the Russian language and claimed she was nearly fluent, although when asked to say a few words of welcome by a reporter to Boris Yeltsin during his visit to Canada in 1993, she could only say "Hello Mr. Yeltsin". Campbell ultimately left her doctoral studies, returning to live in Vancouver after marrying Nathan Divinsky, her longtime partner, in 1972. She earned an LL.B. from the University of British Columbia in 1983. She was called to the British Columbia bar in 1984 and practised law in Vancouver until 1986.

== Family and early political career ==
During her marriage to Divinsky, Campbell lectured part-time in political science at the University of British Columbia and at Vancouver Community College. While still attending law school, she entered politics as a trustee on the Vancouver School Board, becoming its chair in 1983 and vice-chair in 1984. She once claimed to have told the board to "back off", although others alleged that she said "fuck off". In total, she was a trustee there from 1980 to 1984. Campbell and Divinsky were divorced in 1983, and Campbell married Howard Eddy in 1986, a marriage that lasted until shortly before she became prime minister. Campbell is the second prime minister of Canada to have been divorced, after Pierre Trudeau.

She briefly dated Gregory Lekhtman, the inventor of Exerlopers, during her term as prime minister, but the relationship was relatively private and she did not involve him in the 1993 election campaign.

She is currently married to Hershey Felder, an actor, playwright, composer, and concert pianist. As of 2022, she lived outside Florence, Italy.

== Provincial politics ==
=== Failed bid for the legislature ===
In the 1983 British Columbia provincial election, Campbell and future Vancouver Mayor Philip Owen contested the dual-member electoral district of Vancouver Centre as British Columbia Social Credit Party candidates. They were defeated, each receiving fewer than 12,500 votes, compared with nearly 19,000 votes for each of the NDP incumbents, former NDP minister Gary Lauk and future speaker Emery Barnes.

In 1985, she joined the office of Premier Bill Bennett as an executive assistant and policy adviser.

=== Leadership bid ===
In the summer of 1986, Campbell contested the leadership of the Social Credit Party. Despite campaigning on a shoestring budget, her speech at the Whistler leadership convention attracted attention among political figures and positive reviews in the press. The speech foreshadowed her frank approach to discussing political leaders, for which she later faced criticism as prime minister.

To be credible, a leader must show an ability to grasp and understand... complex issues. In this day and age a leader cannot deceive the public with a simplistic vision of the past that can never be recaptured... The challenge of our leader is to raise the level of public understanding of the issues facing us today.

A great political leader is not someone who has all the answers. A great leader is someone who understands the questions and can lead the process of finding solutions.

Noting that Campbell as a leadership contestant "did everything wrong", veteran Victoria Times Colonist journalist Jim Hume nevertheless called her "the star of the show" and her convention speech the "jewel of the convention". In her spoken remarks, she sharply contrasted herself with the populist front-runner and future premier Bill Vander Zalm. "[C]harisma without substance is a dangerous thing," she warned. "It raises expectations that cannot be satisfied. Then comes disillusionment and bitterness that destroys not only the leader, but the party."

Campbell placed last in a field of twelve on the first ballot with just 14 votes out of 1,294 cast. She threw her support behind Vander Zalm's chief opponent Grace McCarthy.

=== Member of the Legislative Assembly ===
In the 1986 election, Campbell contested neighbouring Vancouver-Point Grey, a much more affluent electoral district that has traditionally been receptive to centre-right candidates. She ran for the seat vacated by retiring minister Garde Gardom and was on the ballot with Pat McGeer, another veteran minister and a former Liberal leader. At the end of a closely contested campaign, Campbell topped the poll with close to 20,000 votes, while McGeer was edged out by NDP candidate Darlene Marzari by 55 votes. It was the only time Vancouver-Point Grey as a dual-member district returned members of two different parties. It was also the only time a multi-member district elected only women in British Columbia's electoral history.

Consigned to the backbenches, she became disenchanted with Premier Bill Vander Zalm's leadership and broke with him and Social Credit over the issue of abortion, which Vander Zalm opposed. Campbell decided to leave provincial politics and enter federal politics.

== Federal politics ==
Campbell was elected in the 1988 federal election as the member of Parliament (MP) for Vancouver Centre. She won the Progressive Conservative Party nomination after the incumbent, Pat Carney, declined to stand for renomination. In 1989, Campbell was appointed to the cabinet as minister of state (Indian Affairs and Northern Development), a junior role to the minister of Indian and northern affairs. From 1990 to 1993, she held the post of minister of justice and attorney general, overseeing notable amendments to the Criminal Code in the areas of firearms control and sexual assault. In 1990, following the Supreme Court's decision to invalidate the country's abortion law, Campbell was responsible for introducing Bill C-43 to govern abortions in Canada. Although it passed the House of Commons, it failed to pass the Senate, leaving Canada with no national law governing abortions.

In 1993, Campbell was transferred to the posts of minister of national defence and minister of veterans affairs. Among the issues she dealt with during her tenure was replacing shipborne helicopters for the navy and search-and-rescue units. The actions of the Canadian Airborne Regiment in the scandal known as the Somalia Affair first came to light while Campbell was minister. When the Liberal Party of Canada took power, the incident became the subject of a lengthy public inquiry, which continued to focus attention on Campbell and the PCs, although much of the responsibility was attributed to military rather than government leadership.

=== David Milgaard ===
Upon becoming justice minister, Campbell received a petition for a new trial in the case of David Milgaard, a man who had been wrongfully convicted of murder in 1970 and spent decades trying to clear his name before being exonerated in 1993. In her autobiography, Time and Chance, Campbell wrote that she came under "considerable pressure" from the public and was "bombarded with questions from the media and [from opposition MPs] in Question Period" about the case before she was formally assigned to review Milgaard's petition for a new trial. She said that her decision was delayed by Milgaard's legal team's repeated addition of new submissions to the appeal, which she was not allowed to review until all such submissions were complete. In mid-January 1991, she informed Milgaard's legal team that evidence was insufficient to grant the petition. When Mulroney was later confronted by Milgaard's mother, he "saluted her courage and determination and ... show[n] his concern for her son's health". Campbell said this "blindsided" and "floored" her; some MPs and members of the media interpreted it as evidence that the prime minister had taken sides in the case. Campbell said she "told the press [that] Mulroney was much too good a lawyer to intervene improperly" and that he "never breathed a word" to her about it; nor did anyone in his office attempt to influence her decision. Despite this, she wrote, Milgaard's mother "is convinced he did, and the media accepted this view," which made it difficult for her to convince others that her officials were motivated solely by "a desire to make the right decision."

== Prime Minister (June–November 1993) ==
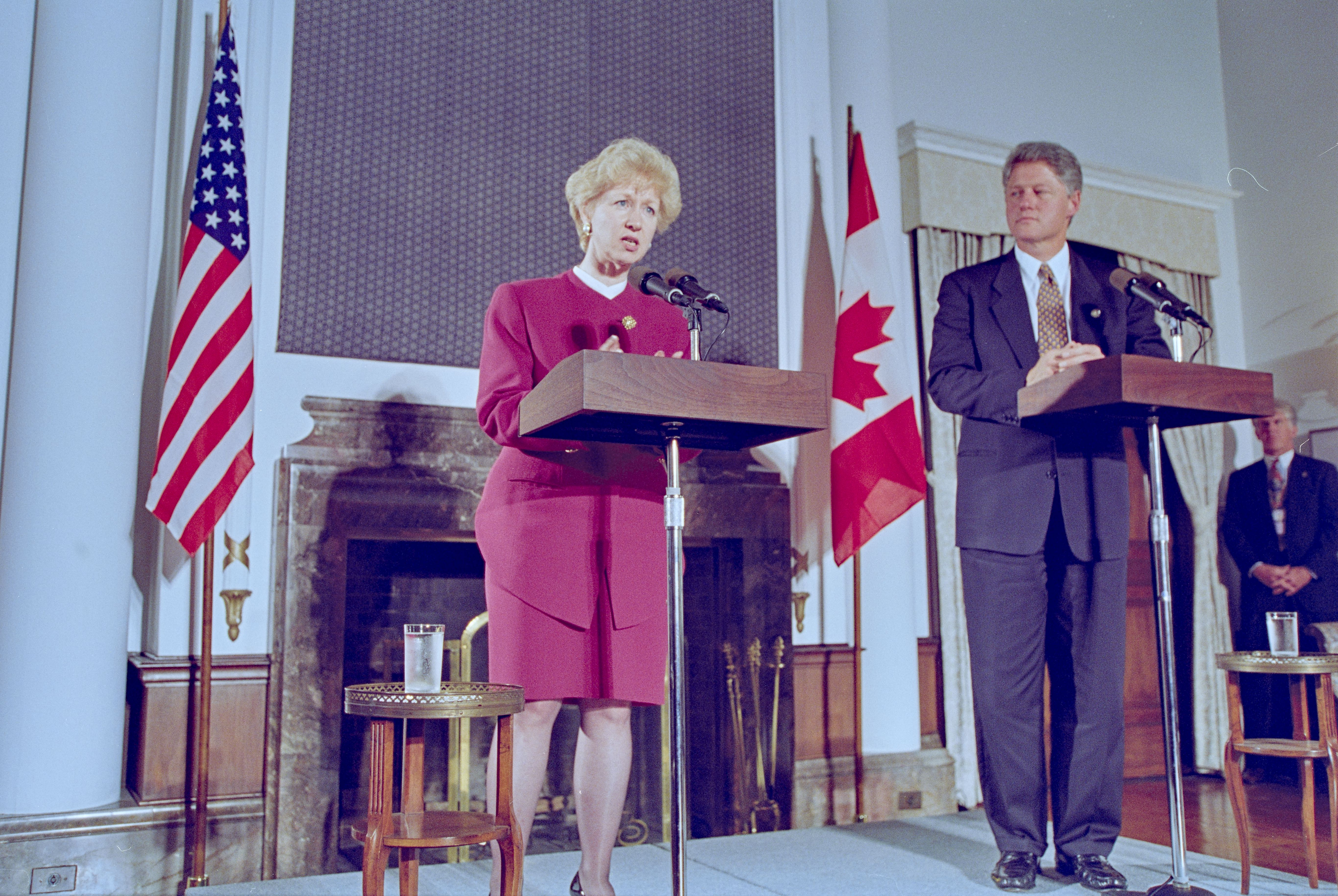
Campbell speaking with then-U.S. president Bill Clinton at a news conference during the G7 Summit in Tokyo, July 1993.

Mulroney entered 1993 facing a statutory federal election. By then, his popularity had markedly declined, and polls suggested that the Tories would be heavily defeated if he led them into that year's election. In February 1993, Mulroney announced his retirement from politics, to take effect after his successor had been chosen. Campbell entered the party leadership race to succeed Mulroney. Campbell had served in four cabinet portfolios prior to running for the party leadership, including three years as minister of justice, and had garnered the support of more than half the PC caucus when she declared for the leadership.

She defeated Jean Charest at the Progressive Conservative leadership convention that June, and Governor General Ray Hnatyshyn appointed her prime minister on June 25. As a concession to Charest, Campbell appointed him to the posts of deputy prime minister and minister of industry, science, and technology—the former a largely symbolic role and the latter a significant cabinet portfolio.

After becoming party leader and prime minister, Campbell set about reorganizing the cabinet. She reduced it from 35 to 23 ministers and consolidated departments into three new ministries: Health, Canadian Heritage, and Public Security. Campbell extensively campaigned during the summer, touring the nation and attending barbecues and other events. In August 1993, a Gallup Canada poll gave Campbell a 51% approval rating, which placed her as Canada's most popular prime minister in 30 years. By the end of the summer, her personal popularity had increased greatly, far surpassing that of Liberal Party leader Jean Chrétien. Support for the Progressive Conservative Party had also increased to within a few points of the Liberals, while the Reform Party had been reduced to single digits.

Campbell was the first Canadian prime minister not to have resided at 24 Sussex Drive since that address became the official home of the prime minister of Canada in 1951. Mulroney remained at 24 Sussex while renovations on his new home in Montreal were being completed. Campbell instead took up residence at Harrington Lake, the prime minister's summer and weekend retreat in rural Quebec, north of Ottawa. She did not move into 24 Sussex after Mulroney left.

=== 1993 federal election ===
Campbell waited as long as she could before asking Hnatyshyn to dissolve Parliament on September 8, only weeks before Parliament was due to expire. The election was scheduled for October 25, the latest date it could be legally held under Section 4 of the Canadian Charter of Rights and Freedoms.

The Progressive Conservatives (PCs) were optimistic that they would be able to remain in power or, failing that, become a strong opposition to a Liberal minority government.

==== Campaign ====
Campbell's initial popularity declined after the election was called. When she was running for the party leadership, Campbell's frankness was seen as an asset and a contrast to Mulroney's highly polished style. However, this backfired when she told reporters at a Rideau Hall event that the deficit or unemployment was unlikely to be much reduced before the "end of the century". During the election campaign, she further stated that discussing a complete overhaul of Canada's social policies in all their complexities could not be done in just 47 days; this was widely interpreted as a claim that an election was no time to discuss important issues.

The PCs' support tailed off as the campaign progressed. By October, polls showed the Liberals were well on their way to at least a minority government, and would probably win a majority without dramatic measures. Even at this point, Campbell was still considerably more popular than Liberal leader Jean Chrétien. In hopes of stemming the tide, the PC campaign team put together a series of ads attacking the Liberal leader. The second ad appeared to mock Chrétien's Bell's palsy-related facial paralysis and generated a severe backlash from the media, with some PC candidates calling for the ad to be pulled from broadcasts. Campbell disavowed direct responsibility for the ad and claimed to have ordered it off the air over her staff's objections.

During the campaign, PC support fell into the teens, while the Liberals, the Reform Party, and the Bloc Québécois gained in the polls. This assured that the Liberals would win a majority government.

==== Election defeat ====
On election night, October 25, the PCs were swept from power in a Liberal landslide. Campbell herself was defeated in Vancouver Centre by Liberal candidate Hedy Fry. She conceded defeat with the remark, "Gee, I'm glad I didn't sell my car."

It was only the third time in Canadian history that a prime minister lost their own riding at the same time that their party lost an election (the first two times both happened to Arthur Meighen, who lost his seat in 1921 and then again in 1926). The PC caucus was reduced to two seats compared to Reform's 52 and the Bloc's 54. All PC members of Parliament running for re-election lost their seats except Jean Charest, who was also the only surviving member of Campbell's cabinet. Charest was joined by the newly elected Elsie Wayne. The PCs' previous support largely bled to the Liberals in Atlantic Canada and Ontario, while Reform inherited virtually all of the former Tory support in the West. The Bloc Québécois inherited most soft-nationalist Tory support in Quebec, and in some cases pushed cabinet ministers from Quebec into third place.

The PCs still finished with over two million votes, taking third place in the popular vote and falling only two percentage points short of Reform for second place. However, as a consequence of the first-past-the-post voting system, PC support was not concentrated in enough areas to translate into victories in individual ridings. It was the worst showing in party history, and the worst defeat ever suffered by a Canadian governing party at the federal level. Like Charles Tupper and John Turner, Campbell never faced a Parliament during her brief tenure, as her term was filled by the summer break and the election campaign.

Gender inequality has been cited as a contributing factor to Campbell's election defeat. University of New Brunswick professor Joanna Everitt writes that while the media simply reported the facts about rival male leaders such as Jean Chrétien, Campbell's actions were usually interpreted as having an underlying motive (such as seeking support or appealing to a particular group).

Additionally, Mulroney left office as one of the most (and, according to Campbell, the most) unpopular prime ministers since opinion polling began in the 1940s. He considerably hampered his own party's campaign effort by staging an extensive international farewell tour at taxpayers' expense and by delaying his retirement until only 2 1/2 months were left in the Tories' five-year mandate.

Canadian humourist Will Ferguson suggested that Campbell should receive "some of the blame" for her party's losses, but that "taking over the party leadership from Brian (Mulroney) was a lot like taking over the controls of a 747 just before it plunges into the Rockies".

On December 13, 1993, Campbell resigned as party leader; Jean Charest succeeded her. Due to the brevity of her tenure as both prime minister (less than four months) and federal MP (less than six years), Campbell did not qualify for a prime ministerial or even a federal parliamentary pension.

== Post-political career ==
Following her party's defeat in the election, Canadian women's magazine Chatelaine named Campbell as its Woman of the Year for 1993. She published an autobiography, Time and Chance, in 1996 (ISBN 0-770-42738-3). The book became a Canadian bestseller and is in its third edition from the University of Alberta Bookstore Press (ISBN 000010132X).

She was briefly rumoured to be under consideration for appointment as ambassador to Russia in Moscow, but in 1996, Campbell was appointed consul general to Los Angeles by the Chrétien government, a post in which she remained until 2000. While she was there, she collaborated on the production of the musical Noah's Ark with her husband, composer, playwright and actor Hershey Felder.

From 1999 to 2003, she chaired the Council of Women World Leaders, a network of women who hold or have held the office of president or prime minister. She was succeeded by former Irish president Mary Robinson. From 2003 until 2005, she served as president of the International Women's Forum, a global organization of prominent women, with headquarters in Washington, DC. From 2001 to 2004, she was with the Center for Public Leadership and lectured at the John F. Kennedy School of Government at Harvard University. She has served as a director of several publicly traded companies in high technology and biotechnology and currently sits on the board of Athenex, a biopharmaceutical company that had its initial public offering on June 14, 2017, and trades under the ticker symbol ATNX.

Campbell chaired the steering committee of the World Movement for Democracy from 2008 to 2015. She served on the board of the International Crisis Group, a non-government organization (NGO) that aims to prevent and resolve deadly conflicts. She served on the boards of the Forum of Federations and the EastWest Institute and is a founding trustee of The International Centre for the Study of Radicalisation and Political Violence at King's College London. She was a founding member of the Club de Madrid, an independent organization whose main purpose is to strengthen democracy in the world. Its membership is by invitation only and consists of former heads of state and government. Campbell has served as its interim president, vice-president and, from 2004 to 2006, secretary general. Campbell was the founding chair of the International Advisory Board of the Ukrainian Foundation for Effective Governance, an NGO formed in September 2007 with the aid of businessman Rinat Akhmetov.

During the 2006 election campaign, Campbell endorsed the candidacy of Tony Fogarassy, the Conservative candidate in Campbell's former riding of Vancouver Centre; Fogarassy went on to lose the election, placing a distant third. At that time, Campbell told reporters that she was a supporter of the new Conservative Party (formed in 2003 as a result of a merger of the Canadian Alliance with the party that Campbell had formerly led, the Progressive Conservatives); however, she stated in 2019 that she had never joined the Conservative Party as an official member.

While testifying in April 2009 at the Mulroney–Schreiber Airbus inquiry, Campbell said she still followed Canadian politics "intermittently".

In April 2014, Campbell was appointed the founding principal of the new Peter Lougheed Leadership College at the University of Alberta.

She has appeared on the CBC Television program Canada's Next Great Prime Minister, a show that profiles and selects young prospective leaders, and has also been an occasional panellist on Real Time with Bill Maher.

On August 2, 2016, Liberal prime minister Justin Trudeau announced that Campbell had agreed to chair a seven-person committee to prepare a short list of candidates to succeed Thomas Cromwell on the Supreme Court of Canada. In mid-October 2016, the committee announced that it would recommend the appointment of Malcolm Rowe to the court, and he was sworn in on October 31 as the first Supreme Court justice to hail from Newfoundland and Labrador.

In August 2019, Campbell faced controversy when she said that she hoped that Hurricane Dorian would directly hit U.S. president Donald Trump's Mar-a-Lago estate in Florida. The president's son Eric responded to Campbell, saying that his family was "rooting for the safety" of those impacted by the hurricane. Campbell soon deleted the tweet and apologized for the remarks.

Campbell attracted criticism for claiming on Twitter that female news presenters who expose their arms on television are taken less seriously, despite having once posed with bare shoulders herself in a photograph that had attracted attention.

Campbell revealed to Maclean's in 2019 that she could not survive in the Conservative Party. She said: "It's too intolerant; it's too right-wing." Following the 2019 federal election, she argued that Conservative leader Andrew Scheer was untrustworthy, stating, "He's hard to trust, and that's really it."

In September 2022, Campbell attended Elizabeth II's state funeral, along with other former Canadian prime ministers.

On the eve of International Women's Day in March 2024, Campbell said on the "Beyond a Ballot" podcast that although she believed there were good people in the Conservative Party, she could not support its leader, Pierre Poilievre, whom she described as a "liar and a hate-monger".

== Legacy ==
As justice minister, Campbell introduced a new sexual assault law establishing that, in cases involving sexual assault, "no means no". She also introduced the rape shield law, legislation restricting the use of a complainant's sexual history as evidence at trial. At the Peter Lougheed Leadership College at the University of Alberta, Campbell supported a proposal from the inaugural cohort of scholars to introduce mandatory education on sexual assault for students.

Since Parliament never sat during Campbell's four months as prime minister, she was unable to bring forth new legislation, which must be passed by Parliament. She did, however, make significant changes to the structure of the Canadian government. Under her tenure, the federal cabinet's size was cut from over 35 cabinet ministers and ministers of state to 23. This included the redesign of eight ministries and the abolition or merging of 15 others. The Chrétien government retained these new ministries when it took office. The number of cabinet committees was reduced from 11 to five. Her successors have generally maintained a federal cabinet of about 30 members. She was also the first prime minister to convene a First Ministers' conference for consultation prior to representing Canada at the G7 Summit. Due to her brief time in office, Campbell is unusual among Canadian prime ministers in having made no Senate appointments.

Campbell harshly criticized Mulroney for not allowing her to succeed him before June 1993. In her view, when she became prime minister, she had very little time or chance to make up ground on the Liberals once her initial popularity faded. In her memoirs, Time and Chance, and in her response to The Secret Mulroney Tapes, Campbell suggested that Mulroney knew the Tories would be defeated in the upcoming election and wanted a "scapegoat who would bear the burden of his unpopularity" rather than a viable successor. The cause of the 1993 debacle remains disputed, with some arguing that the election results were a vote against Mulroney rather than a rejection of Campbell, and others suggesting that the poorly run Campbell campaign was the key factor in the result.

Although the Progressive Conservatives survived as a distinct political party for another decade after the 1993 debacle, they never recovered their previous standing. During that period they were led by Jean Charest (1993–1998), Elsie Wayne (1998) and, for the second time, Joe Clark (1998–2003), who had been opposition leader and briefly prime minister two decades earlier. By 2003, the party under new leader Peter MacKay had voted to merge with the Canadian Alliance to form the Conservative Party of Canada, thus ceasing to exist, despite MacKay having promised not to pursue a merger. Joe Clark continued to sit as a "Progressive Conservative" into 2004. The new generation of right-leaning Conservatives gained power in the election of 2006, ensuring the continued use of the "Tory" nickname in Canadian federal politics. A small PC caucus continued to exist in the Senate of Canada (consisting of certain Clark, Mulroney and Paul Martin appointees); Elaine McCoy of Alberta was the last Progressive Conservative Senator, redesignating herself as an "Independent Progressive Conservative" in 2013 before launching the Independent Senators Group in 2016.

Campbell remains one of the youngest women to have ever assumed the office of prime minister in any country and therefore also one of the youngest to have left it.

Campbell was ranked 20th out of the first 20 prime ministers of Canada (through Jean Chrétien) by a survey of 26 Canadian historians used by J. L. Granatstein and Norman Hillmer in their 1999 book Prime Ministers: Ranking Canada's Leaders. A follow-up article co-authored by Hillmer alongside Stephen Azzi in 2011 for Maclean's magazine expanded the number of historians surveyed; in this new survey of over 100 Canadian historians, Campbell again finished last, this time coming at number 22 out of Canada's first 22 prime ministers (through Stephen Harper). A 2016 follow-up poll by the same team, now expanded to cover the first 23 prime ministers (through Justin Trudeau), again ranked Campbell last.

In 2004, she was included in the list of 50 most important political leaders in history in the Almanac of World History compiled by the National Geographic Society. She was cited for her status as the only female head of government of a North American country (defined variously), but some Canadian academics questioned the honour because of her brief tenure and the limited number of major policy achievements during her time in office.

On November 30, 2004, Campbell's official portrait for the parliamentary prime ministers' gallery was unveiled. The painting was created by David Goatley, an artist from Victoria. Campbell said she was "deeply honoured" to be the only woman to have her picture in the prime ministers' corridor, stating: "I really look forward to the day when there are many other female faces." The painting shows a pensive Campbell sitting on a chair with richly coloured Haida capes and robes in the background, symbolizing her time as a cabinet minister and as an academic.

== Honours ==

Honours
Ribbon	Description	Notes
	Companion of the Order of Canada (C.C.)	Awarded on April 10, 2008; Invested on September 3, 2010
	Member of the Order of British Columbia (O.B.C.)	2012
	125th Anniversary of the Confederation of Canada Medal	1993; As a member of Her Majesty's Privy Council for Canada and an elected Member of the House of Commons of Canada, the then Honourable Kim Campbell was awarded the medal as a member of the Canadian order of precedence.
	Queen Elizabeth II Golden Jubilee Medal for Canada	2002; As a member of Her Majesty's Privy Council for Canada and as a former prime minister of Canada, the Right Honourable Kim Campbell was awarded the medal as a member of the Canadian order of precedence.
	Queen Elizabeth II Diamond Jubilee Medal for Canada	2012; As a member of Her Majesty's Privy Council for Canada, as a former prime minister of Canada, and having been awarded the Order of Canada, the Right Honourable Kim Campbell was awarded the medal as a member of the Canadian order of precedence.

Under Canadian protocol, she is styled "The Right Honourable" for life as a former prime minister.

- Appointed a Companion of the Order of Canada on Canada Day in 2008
- Member of the board of Forum of Federations.

== Scholastic ==
Chancellorships, fellowships and other academic appointments

Location	Date	School	Position
Massachusetts	2001 –	Center for Public Leadership John F. Kennedy School of Government at Harvard University	Honorary Fellow
England	–	London School of Economics	Honorary Fellow
Ontario	–	Munk School of Global Affairs at the University of Toronto	Distinguished Senior Fellow

Honorary degrees

Location	Date	School	Degree
Ontario	1992	Law Society of Upper Canada	Doctor of Laws (LL.D.)
Ontario	June 13, 1998	Brock University	Doctor of Laws (LL.D.)
Massachusetts	June 19, 1999	Northeastern University	Doctor of Public Service (DPS)
British Columbia	November 23, 2000	University of British Columbia	Doctor of Laws (LL.D.)
Massachusetts	2004	Mount Holyoke College	Doctor of Laws (LL.D.)
Pennsylvania	2005	Chatham College	Doctor of Laws (LL.D.)
Arizona	December 15, 2005	Arizona State University	Doctor of Humane Letters (DHL)
Alberta	Fall 2010	University of Alberta	Doctor of Laws (LL.D.)
Ontario	2011	Trent University	Doctor of Laws (LL.D.)
British Columbia	June 11, 2014	Simon Fraser University	Doctor of Laws (LL.D.)
Nova Scotia	May 13, 2018	Acadia University	Doctor of Civil Law (DCL)

== Appointments ==
Location	Date	Institution	Position
Canada	January 30, 1989 –	Queen's Privy Council for Canada	Member (PC)
Canada	–	Government of Canada	Queen's Counsel (QC)
Canada	1996–2000	Government of Canada	Consul General to Los Angeles

== Memberships and fellowships ==
Location	Date	Organisation	Position
Spain	2001–	Club of Madrid	Member
Spain	2003–2004	Club of Madrid	Vice-President
Spain	2004–2006	Club of Madrid	Secretary General
District of Columbia	2003–2005	Council of Women World Leaders	President

== Arms ==
Coat of arms of Kim Campbell
Notes The arms of Kim Campbell consist of: Crest Upon a helmet mantled Azure doubled Or within a wreath of these colours issuant from a coronet the rim set with thistle heads Or on snowy mountain peaks Proper an eagle Azure head Argent its dexter leg resting on a closed book Rose clasped Or. Escutcheon Or the universal symbol for a woman pendant from its crosspiece a pair of scales Rose and in base three bars wavy Azure on a canton the mark of the Prime Ministership of Canada (Argent four maple leaves conjoined in cross at the stem Gules). Supporters Dexter a lion Or semé of fleurs-de-lys Azure gorged with a collar of poppy flowers Gules its dexter foreclaw resting on the pommel of a sheathed sword point downwards Azure embellished Or sinister a female bear Or semé of anchors Azure gorged with a like collar its dexter forepaw grasping a branch of cedar Vert embellished Or. Compartment On a grassy mound set with dogwood flowers, trillium flowers and Mayflowers Proper and pine cones Or rising above barry wavy Argent and Azure. Motto Seek Wisdom, Conquer Fear, Do Justice Other elements Mantling Or and Azure.

== Electoral record ==
1993 Canadian federal election: Vancouver Centre
Party	Candidate	Votes	%	±%
Liberal	Hedy Fry	20,095	31.09	+8.28
Progressive Conservative	Kim Campbell	16,274	25.18	–12.06
Reform	Ian Isbister	11,235	17.38	+16.00
New Democratic	Betty Baxter	9,830	15.21	–21.60
National	Thorsten Ewald	5,144	7.96	–
Natural Law	John Cowhig	670	1.04	–
Green	Imtiaz Popat	616	0.95	+0.14
Christian Heritage	Darren Lowe	254	0.39	–
Libertarian	Tunya Audain	252	0.39	+0.14
Independent	Brian Godzilla Gnu Salmi	109	0.17	–
Independent	Scott Adams	99	0.15	–0.04
Commonwealth of Canada	Lucille Boikoff	27	0.04	–
Independent	Peter C. Nuthall	24	0.04	–
Total valid votes		64,629	99.01	
Total rejected ballots		644	0.99	+0.51
Turnout		65,249	64.73	–12.89
Eligible voters		100,841		
Liberal gain from Progressive Conservative		Swing		+10.17
Source: Elections Canada

1993 Progressive Conservative leadership election
Candidate	1st ballot		2nd ballot	
Candidate	Votes cast	%	Votes cast	%
Kim Campbell	1,664	48.0%	1,817	52.7%
Jean Charest	1,369	39.5%	1,630	47.3%
Jim Edwards	307	8.8%	Endorsed Campbell	
Garth Turner	76	2.2%	Withdrew; Did not endorse	
Patrick Boyer	53	1.5%	Endorsed Charest	
Total	3,469	100.0%	3,447	100.0%

1988 Canadian federal election: Vancouver Centre
Party	Candidate	Votes	%	±%
Progressive Conservative	Kim Campbell	23,620	37.24	–5.99
New Democratic	Johanna Den Hertog	23,351	36.81	+4.38
Liberal	Tex Enemark	14,467	22.81	+1.59
Reform	Paula Folkard	876	1.38	–
Green	Murray Gudmundson	514	0.81	–0.25
Rhinoceros	Bob Nitestalker Colebrook	262	0.41	–0.56
Libertarian	Duane H. Pye	156	0.25	–0.38
Independent	Scott Adams	125	0.20	–
Independent	Dorothy-Jean O'Donnell	58	0.09	–
Total valid votes		63,429	99.52	
Total rejected ballots		306	0.48	–0.19
Turnout		63,735	77.62	+2.09
Eligible voters		82,107		
Progressive Conservative hold		Swing		–5.18
Source: Elections Canada

34th British Columbia election, 1986: Vancouver-Point Grey
Party	Candidate	Votes	%	±	Expenditures
Liberal	Doreen Braverman	6,680	7.88%		
Liberal	Thomas Airlie Brown	5,505	6.49%		
Social Credit	Kim Campbell	19,716	23.24%		
Green	Douglas Dunn	498	0.59%		
New Democratic	Richard J. (Dick) Gathercole	15,729	18.55%		
Social Credit	Patrick Lucey McGeer	18,256	21.52%	–	unknown
New Democratic	Darlene R. Marzari	18,311	21.59%		
People's Front	Allen Harvey Soroka	120	0.14%		
Total valid votes		84,815			
Total rejected ballots		682			

=== 1986 British Columbia Social Credit Party leadership convention ===
(Held on July 29–30, 1986.)

First ballot:

- Bill Vander Zalm 367
- Grace McCarthy 244
- Bud Smith 202
- Brian Smith 196
- Jim Nielsen 54
- John Reynolds 54
- Stephen Rogers 43
- Bob Wenman 40
- Cliff Michael 32
- Bill Ritchie 28
- Mel Couvelier 20
- Kim Campbell 14

1983 British Columbia general election: Vancouver Centre
Party	Candidate	Votes	%	Elected
New Democratic	Emery Oakland Barnes	18,960	28.70	✓
New Democratic	Gary Vernon Lauk	18,743	28.37	✓
Social Credit	Avril Kim Campbell	12,740	19.28	
Social Credit	Philip W. Owen	12,415	18.79	
Liberal	Shirley McLoughlin	2,084	3.15	
Progressive Conservative	Kevin Baden Bruce	880	1.33	
Communist	Maurice Rush	244	0.37	
Total valid votes		66,066	99.87	
Total rejected ballots		84	0.13	
Total votes		66,150		
Registered voters		53,512		

== See also ==
- Time and Chance (Kim Campbell)

=== Archives ===
There is a Kim Campbell fonds at Library and Archives Canada. The archival reference number is R10052, former archival reference number MG26-S. The fonds covers the date ranges 1916 to 2004. It contains a variety of media including 58.13 meters of textual records, approximately 33542 photographs and 139 videocassettes among other media.

== Notes ==
Legislative Assembly of British Columbia
Preceded by Pat McGeer; Garde Gardom	Member of the Legislative Assembly for Vancouver-Point Grey; 1986–1988; Served alongside: Darlene Marzari	Succeeded by Tom Perry
Parliament of Canada
Preceded by Pat Carney	Member of Parliament for Vancouver Centre; 1988–1993	Succeeded by Hedy Fry
24th Canadian Ministry (1984–1993) – Cabinet of Brian Mulroney
Cabinet posts (3)
Predecessor	Office	Successor
Doug Lewis	Minister of Justice and Attorney General; 1990–1993	Pierre Blais
Gerald Merrithew	Minister of Veterans Affairs; 1993	Peter McCreath
Marcel Massé	Minister of National Defence; 1993	Tom Siddon
Party political offices
Preceded by Brian Mulroney	Leader of the Progressive Conservative Party; 1993	Succeeded by Jean Charest; Interim
Political offices
Preceded by Brian Mulroney	Prime Minister of Canada; 1993	Succeeded by Jean Chrétien
Order of precedence
Preceded by Joe Clark as Former Prime Minister	Canadian order of precedence as Former Prime Minister	Succeeded by Jean Chrétien as Former Prime Minister
