= Leslie Peterson (politician) =

Canadian politician (1923-2015)

Leslie Peterson CM OBC QC

Member of the British Columbia Legislative Assembly for Vancouver-Little Mountain
- In office 1966–1972 Serving with Grace McCarthy
- Preceded by: Riding established
- Succeeded by: Phyllis Florence Young; Roy Thomas Cummings

Member of the British Columbia Legislative Assembly for Vancouver Centre
- In office 1956–1966 Serving with Alexander Small Matthew
- Preceded by: George Churchill Moxham
- Succeeded by: Herb Capozzi; Evan Maurice Wolfe

Personal details
- Born: October 6, 1923 near Viking, Alberta
- Died: April 14, 2015 (aged 91)
- Party: British Columbia Social Credit Party
- Other political affiliations: Social Credit Party of Canada
- Spouse: Agnes Hine (m. 1950)
- Education: University of British Columbia Faculty of Law
- Profession: lawyer

Military service
- Allegiance: Canada
- Branch/service: Royal Canadian Artillery
- Years of service: 1942-1946
- Battles/wars: World War II

Leslie Raymond Peterson CM OBC QC (6 October 1923 – 14 April 2015) was a Canadian lawyer, politician, and university chancellor. He was a Member of the Legislative Assembly (MLA) of British Columbia, representing Vancouver Centre from 1956 to 1966, and Vancouver-Little Mountain from 1966 to 1972. He served as cabinet minister under Premier W. A. C. Bennett as part of the British Columbia Social Credit Party (Socred) caucus.

== Background ==
He was born near Viking, Alberta, the son of Herman S. Peterson, a native of Norway. He attended Camrose Lutheran College, then joined the Royal Canadian Artillery during World War II, serving from 1942 to 1946. He completed first year at McGill University in Montreal, then continued his studies by correspondence, and attended the University of London while posted in England. After the war he enrolled in the University of British Columbia (UBC) Faculty of Law; he graduated in 1949 and was called to the British Columbia bar the same year. Initially practising by himself, he co-founded the Vancouver law firm Peterson and Anderson in 1952. He married Agnes Rose Hine in 1950; the couple had two children.

== Political career ==
He ran in the 1953 federal election as a Social Credit Party of Canada candidate in the riding of Vancouver Centre, but lost to the incumbent Liberal candidate Ralph Campney. Following the death of Vancouver Centre MLA George Churchill Moxham in 1955, Peterson contested the January 1956 by-election as a British Columbia Social Credit Party candidate. He defeated Progressive Conservative candidate Douglas Jung and others to be elected to the Legislative Assembly of British Columbia, representing the dual-member riding alongside Alexander Small Matthew.

Peterson was re-elected in the September 1956 provincial election, and became minister of education under Premier W. A. C. Bennett. He stayed on as education minister after winning re-election in 1960, and additionally took on the role of labour minister to replace Lyle Wicks, who lost his own seat.

For the 1966 provincial election he ran in the newly established dual-member riding of Vancouver-Little Mountain, and was elected there alongside Grace McCarthy. Following the resignation of Robert Bonner from cabinet, Peterson was reassigned as Attorney General of British Columbia in May 1968, but concurrently kept the labour portfolio until April 1971. He and McCarthy were both narrowly defeated in the 1972 provincial election by New Democratic Party candidates Phyllis Florence Young and Roy Thomas Cummings. During his time in cabinet, he oversaw the establishment of the British Columbia Institute of Technology, Simon Fraser University, and the Provincial Court of British Columbia.

He served as Socred campaign chair during the 1979 provincial election.

== After politics ==
He resumed practising law in 1972 after losing re-election, then became a member of the Board of Governors of UBC in 1978, serving as chair from 1979 to 1983. He was subsequently elected the University's Chancellor in 1987, serving until 1993.

He was appointed to the Order of British Columbia in 1990, and was also appointed a Member of the Order of Canada in 2000. He died on April 14, 2015, at age 91.

== Electoral record ==
1953 Canadian federal election: Vancouver Centre
Party	Candidate	Votes	%	±%
Liberal	Ralph Campney	8,259	40.83	–1.73
Social Credit	Leslie Peterson	4,946	24.45	–
Co-operative Commonwealth	Rodney Young	4,516	22.33	–4.05
Progressive Conservative	Wendell Willard Wright	1,749	8.65	–16.02
Labor–Progressive	Ernest Lawrie	756	3.74	–0.20
Total valid votes		20,226	99.05	
Total rejected ballots		195	0.95	–0.31
Turnout		20,421	57.91	–4.61
Eligible voters		35,263		
Liberal hold		Swing		−13.09
Source: Library of Parliament

Political offices
Preceded by Robert Bonner	Attorney General of British Columbia; May 27, 1968 – September 15, 1972	Succeeded by Alex MacDonald
Preceded by Lyle Wicks	Minister of Labour of British Columbia; November 28, 1960 – April 2, 1971	Succeeded by James Chabot
Preceded by Ray Gillis Williston	Minister of Education of British Columbia; September 27, 1956 – May 27, 1968	Succeeded by Donald Leslie Brothers
Academic offices
Preceded by W. Robert Wyman	Chancellor of the University of British Columbia; 1987–1993	Succeeded by Robert H. Lee
