= Evan Maurice Wolfe =

Canadian politician

Member of the British Columbia Legislative Assembly for Vancouver-Little Mountain
- In office December 11, 1975 – May 5, 1983 Serving with Grace McCarthy
- Preceded by: Roy Thomas Cummings; Phyllis Florence Young
- Succeeded by: Doug Mowat

Member of the British Columbia Legislative Assembly for Vancouver Centre
- In office September 12, 1966 – August 30, 1972 Serving with Herb Capozzi
- Preceded by: Leslie Raymond Peterson; Alexander Small Matthew
- Succeeded by: Gary Vernon Lauk; Emery Oakland Barnes

Personal details
- Born: Evan Maurice Wolfe; November 5, 1922 Edmonton, Alberta
- Died: May 1, 2009 (aged 86) Vancouver, British Columbia
- Party: Social Credit

Evan Maurice Wolfe (November 5, 1922 – May 1, 2009) was a car dealer and political figure in British Columbia. He represented Vancouver Centre from 1966 to 1972 and Vancouver-Little Mountain from 1975 to 1983 in the Legislative Assembly of British Columbia as a Social Credit member.

He was born in Edmonton, Alberta, the son of Frank J. Wolfe, and was educated at the University of Alberta. He served in the Royal Canadian Air Force during World War II. In 1945, Wolfe married Phyllis Jeanne. He was defeated when he ran for reelection to the assembly in 1972. Wolfe served in the provincial cabinet as Minister of Finance, Minister of Deregulation, and as Provincial Secretary and Minister of Government Services. He died in 2009.

Wolfe also curled, and represented British Columbia at the 1959 Macdonald Brier.
