= Laura Marshall Jamieson =

Canadian politician and educator

Laura Emma Marshall Jamieson (December 29, 1882 – June 30, 1964) was an educator and political figure in British Columbia. She represented Vancouver Centre in the Legislative Assembly of British Columbia from 1939 to 1945 and from 1952 to 1953 as a Co-operative Commonwealth Federation (CCF) member.

She was born Laura Emma Marshall in Park Head, Ontario, the daughter of Joseph Marshall and Lucy Smith, and was educated in Owen Sound and at University of Toronto. In 1901, she married John Stewart Jamieson. Jamieson was a member of the BC Public Library Commission and served as a juvenile court judge in Burnaby. She was first elected to the assembly in a 1939 by-election held following the death of Fred Crone and reelected in 1941 and again in 1952. Jamieson was defeated when she ran for reelection in 1945 and 1953. She also served as alderman for the city of Vancouver. Jamieson died in hospital in Vancouver at the age of 81 after a short illness.
