= Gregory Lekhtman =

Canadian inventor and entrepreneur (born 1946)

- Born: 1946 (age 78–79); Moscow, USSR
- Occupation(s): Inventor, entrepreneur

Gregory Lekhtman (born 1946 in Moscow, USSR) is a Canadian inventor and entrepreneur, who created and markets the Exerloper system of exercise boots. He immigrated to Canada in 1974, and resides in Montreal.

Lekhtman was romantically involved with Kim Campbell during her term as Prime Minister of Canada. They kept their relationship relatively private, and Lekhtman did not participate in the 1993 election campaign. Campbell first spoke publicly about their relationship in her 1996 autobiography Time and Chance, most notably revealing that she had spent the day of September 4, 1993 — the Saturday before she issued the writ of election — frolicking with Lekhtman and other friends in Exerlopers on the lawn at Harrington Lake.
