= Alberni-Nanaimo =

Alberni-Nanaimo was a provincial electoral district in the Canadian province of British Columbia which was used only in the general elections of 1933 and 1937.

For other current and historical ridings on Vancouver Island, please see Vancouver Island (electoral districts).

== Electoral history ==
Note: Winners of each election are in bold.

18th British Columbia election, 1933
Party	Candidate	Votes	%	±	Expenditures
United Front (Workers and Farmers)	Alexander Cramb	185	2.79%	–	unknown
Independent	Roy Branwood Dier	162	2.44%		unknown
Non-Partisan Independent Group	George Arthur Benjamin Hall	781	11.79%	–	unknown
Liberal	**George Sharratt Pearson**	**3,146**	**47.47%**		unknown
Co-operative Commonwealth Fed.	James Lyle Telford	2,353	35.51%		unknown
Total valid votes		6,627	100.00%		
Total rejected ballots		76			
Turnout		%			

19th British Columbia election, 1937
Party	Candidate	Votes	%	±	Expenditures
Social Constructive	Frederick Henry Giles	397	4.87%		
Liberal	**George Sharratt Pearson**	**3,616**	**44.34 %**		unknown
Co-operative Commonwealth Fed.	Alexander Maitland Stephen ^{1}	3,129	38.36%		unknown
Conservative	Nicholas Wright	1,014	12.43%		unknown
Total valid votes		8,156	100.00%		
Total rejected ballots		100			
Turnout		%			
^{1} Although suspended and repudiated by the provincial executive, Stephen was nominated by the Alberni-Nanaimo CCF Club, and ran as a CCF candidate.

The riding was redistributed after the 1937 election. In the 1941 general election the successor ridings to Alberni-Nanaimo were:

- Alberni
- Nanaimo and the Islands

== See also ==
- Politics of Canada
