= Phyllis Florence Young =

Canadian politician

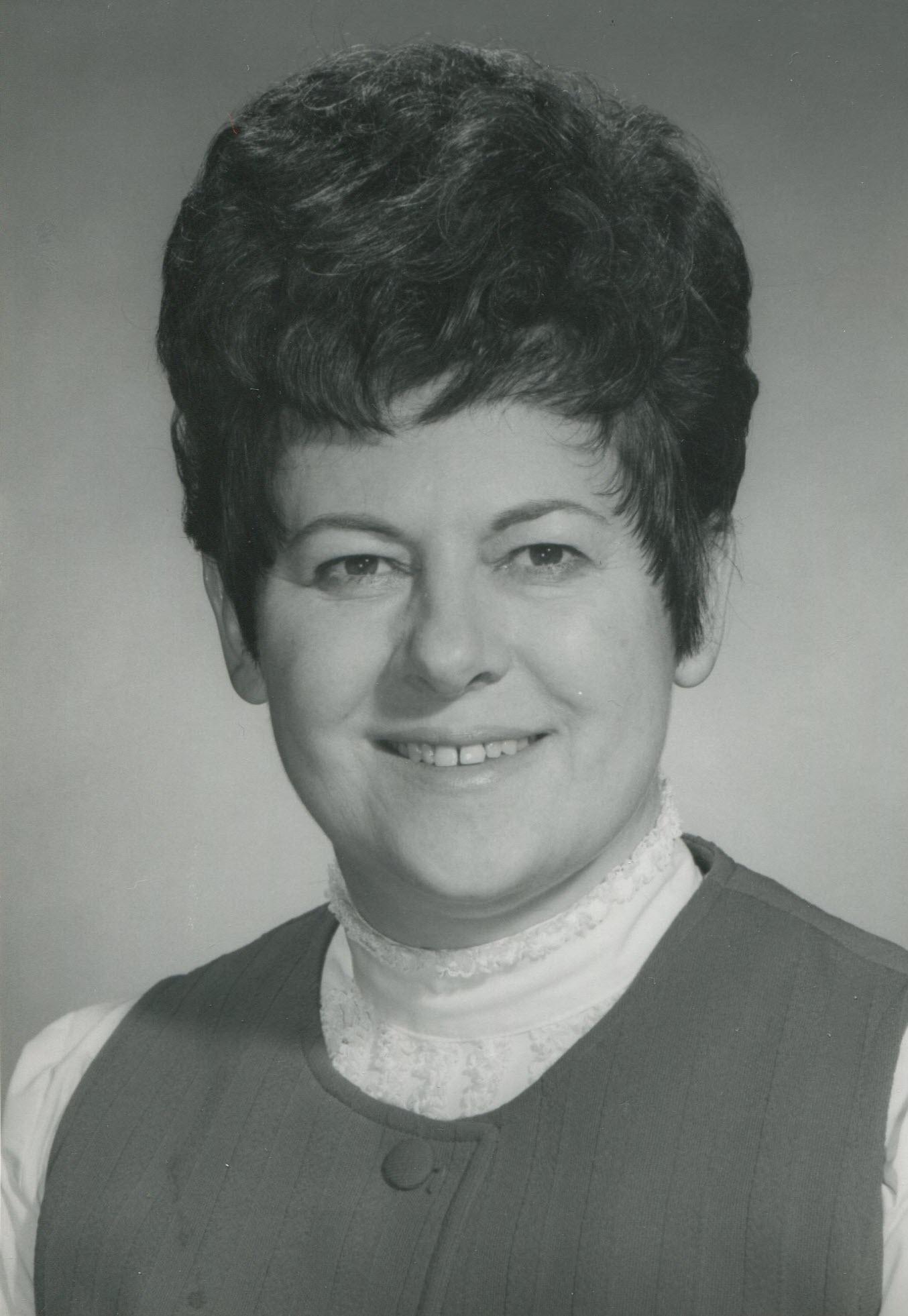

Member of the British Columbia Legislative Assembly for Vancouver-Little Mountain
- In office August 30, 1972 – December 11, 1975 Serving with Roy Cummings
- Preceded by: Grace McCarthy; Leslie Peterson
- Succeeded by: Grace McCarthy; Evan Maurice Wolfe

Personal details
- Born: April 5, 1925 Grand Rapids, Michigan, U.S.
- Died: March 17, 1984 (aged 58) Burnaby, British Columbia, Canada
- Party: New Democratic
- Profession: Trade unionist

Phyllis Florence Young (April 5, 1925 – March 17, 1984) was a Canadian trade unionist and politician. She served in the Legislative Assembly of British Columbia from 1972 to 1975, as a NDP member for the constituency of Vancouver-Little Mountain. In 1973, she complained of gender-based discrimination in the labour movement and cited it as a reason for her entry to electoral politics.

From May 18, 1973 to November 8, 1973, she served as Minister without Portfolio, responsible for consumer services. From November 8, 1973 to December 22, 1975, she served as Minister of Consumer Services.
