= Darlene Marzari =

Canadian politician

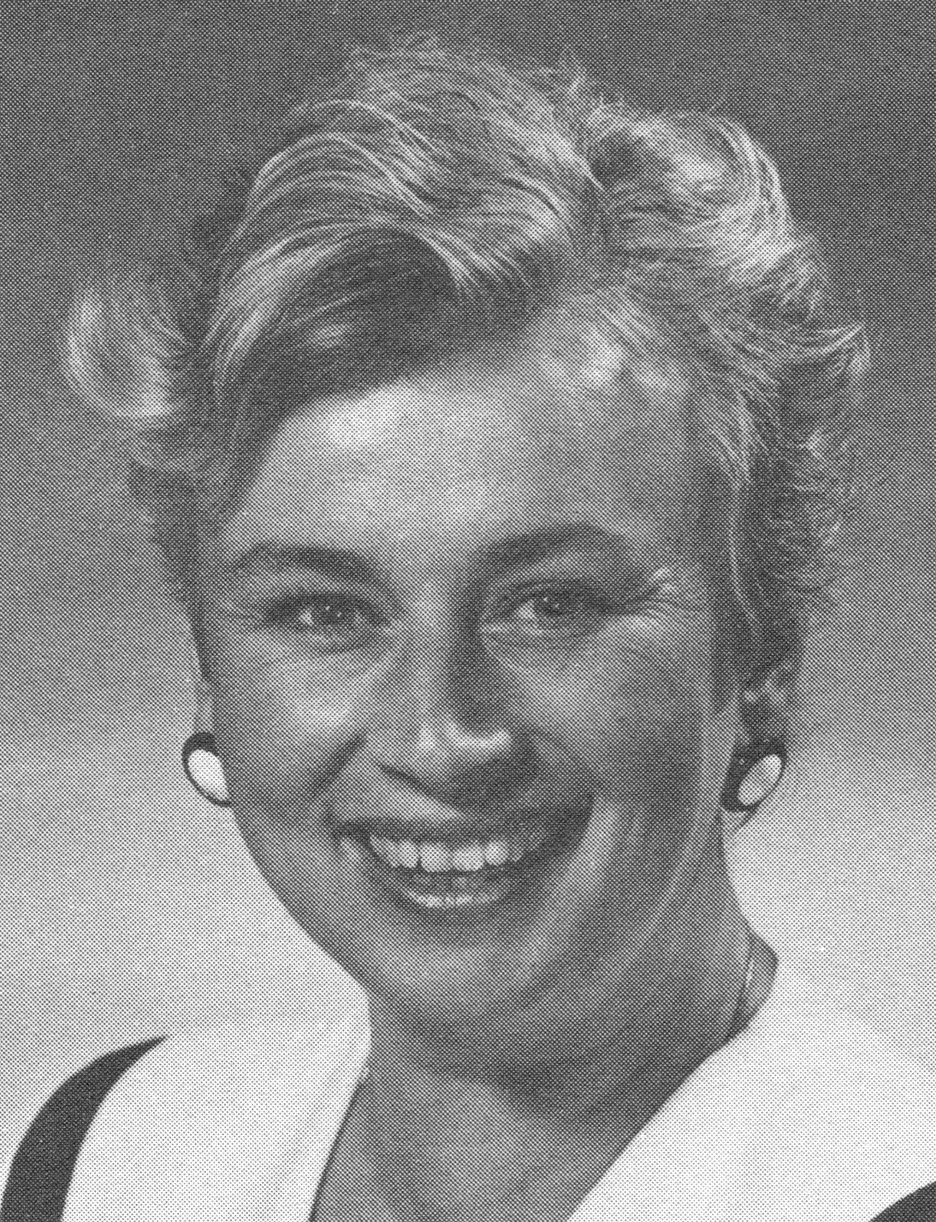

Member of the British Columbia Legislative Assembly for Vancouver-Point Grey
- In office October 22, 1986 – May 28, 1996 Serving with Kim Campbell (1986-1988); Tom Perry (1989-1991)
- Preceded by: Pat McGeer; Garde Gardom
- Succeeded by: Gordon Campbell

Personal details
- Born: July 6, 1943 (age 82) Toronto, Ontario
- Party: New Democrat

Darlene Marzari (born July 6, 1943) is a former Canadian politician. She was elected as a Vancouver alderman under the TEAM banner in 1972 and remained on city council for eight years (four terms). She served as MLA for the riding of Vancouver-Point Grey in the Legislative Assembly of British Columbia from 1986 to 1996, as a member of the British Columbia New Democratic Party.

In the 1986 election, she was elected alongside Kim Campbell in what was then a multiple-member district. Campbell resigned in 1988 to run in the 1988 federal election, and was succeeded by Tom Perry in a 1989 by-election.

The 1991 election was contested under new single-member boundaries. Marzari ran as the sole NDP candidate in Point Grey, while Perry moved to Vancouver-Little Mountain. Marzari was re-elected that year. She did not run in the 1996 election, and was succeeded by Gordon Campbell.

She served in the Executive Council of British Columbia under Premiers Mike Harcourt and Glen Clark, as Minister of Tourism, Minister Responsible for Culture and Minister of Municipal Affairs.
