= Herb Capozzi =

Canadian politician (1925–2011)

Herb Capozzi OBC
- Herb Capozzi wearing the insignia of the Order of British Columbia in 2008

Member of the Legislative Assembly of British Columbia for Vancouver Centre
- In office January 24, 1967 – October 17, 1972 Serving with Evan Maurice Wolfe
- Preceded by: Alexander Small Matthew and Leslie Peterson
- Succeeded by: Emery Barnes and Gary Lauk

Personal details
- Born: Harold Peter Capozzi; April 24, 1925 Kelowna, British Columbia, Canada
- Died: November 21, 2011 (aged 86) Kelowna, British Columbia, Canada
- Occupation: Businessman
- Known for: Athlete, businessman, politician

Harold Peter "Herb" Capozzi (April 24, 1925 – November 21, 2011) was an athlete, businessman, professional sports team manager and political figure in British Columbia. He represented Vancouver Centre in the Legislative Assembly of British Columbia from 1966 to 1972 as a Social Credit member. He ran unsuccessfully for the Legislature in the 1963, 1972 and 1975 provincial elections.

He was born in Kelowna in 1925, the son of Pasquale "Cap" Capozzi, an Italian immigrant. Capozzi won a sports scholarship to the University of British Columbia, where he received B.A. and BComm degrees. At university, Herb was a member of the BC Alpha chapter of the Phi Delta Theta fraternity. In 1952, he moved to Calgary, where he worked for Shell Oil.

Capozzi played with the Calgary Stampeders and Montreal Alouettes of the Canadian Football League. As a racketball player, he won the Canadian Masters championship in 1974 and the Canadian Golden Masters championship in 1981. Capozzi was general manager of the BC Lions from 1957 to 1966 when he was elected to the provincial assembly. The Lions won the Grey Cup in 1964.

He loaned the Vancouver Canucks hockey team then owned by Northwest Sports enough money to continue operations in 1971, helping to keep the team in Canada.

Capozzi established the Vancouver Whitecaps soccer team in 1974. He served as owner, president, and board chairman of the team. Under his ownership, the team won the North American Soccer League (NASL) Soccer Bowl title in 1979.

He was a member of the BC Sports Hall of Fame and the Canadian Soccer Hall of Fame and had received the Order of British Columbia in 2008.

Capozzi was a director responsible for food, entertainment and housing for Expo 86.

He was a co-founder of The Keg restaurant chain with George Tidball and was instrumental in bringing McDonald's restaurants to Canada. He was an owner of Calona Wines and the Capri Hotel (now the Coast Capri Hotel) and Capri Centre Mall. Capozzi was also president of Pasadena Investments, a development company based in Kelowna.

He died at home in Kelowna at the age of 86 from lung cancer.
