= Wallis Walter LeFeaux =

Canadian politician (1881–1972)

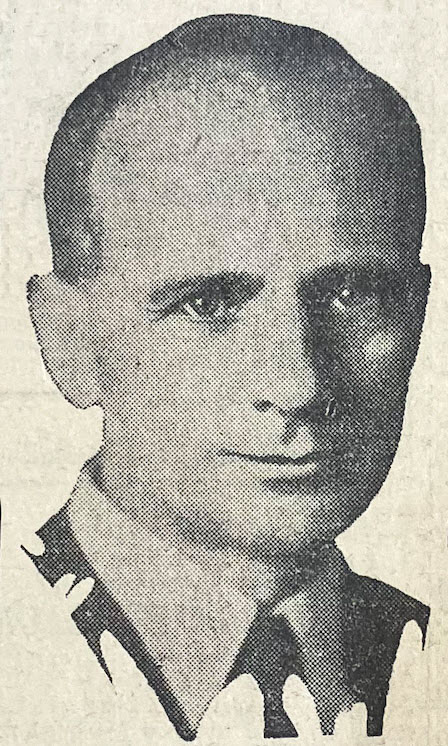

MLA for Vancouver Centre
- In office 1941–1945

Personal details
- Born: September 19, 1881 London, England
- Died: November 24, 1972 (aged 91) West Vancouver, British Columbia, Canada
- Party: Co-operative Commonwealth Federation

Wallis Walter Lefeaux (September 19, 1881 – November 24, 1972) was an English-born merchant, lawyer and political figure in British Columbia. He represented Vancouver Centre in the Legislative Assembly of British Columbia from 1941 to 1945 as a Co-operative Commonwealth Federation (CCF) member.

He was born in London in 1881, of Huguenot descent, and worked as a bookkeeper and travelling salesman before coming to Canada at the age of 20. Lefeaux worked as a fur trader before becoming a clothing retailer. He was also involved in real estate. He served as an alderman in Revelstoke. Lefeaux was also president of the Socialist Party of Canada. He ran unsuccessfully as a Socialist candidate provincially in 1907, 1912 and 1916, as a Labour candidate for the Canadian House of Commons in 1925 and 1926 and as a CCF candidate for the Vancouver Centre provincial seat in 1933 before being elected to the provincial assembly in 1941. Lefeaux was defeated when he ran for reelection to the assembly in 1945 and 1949. He died in West Vancouver at the age of 90.

In 1921, he published A study of bolshevism.
