= Creative BC Film Commission =

Agency promoting film and television in British Columbia

The BC Film Commission at Creative BC is an agency established by the provincial government that promotes film and television in British Columbia, including Metro Vancouver. Creative BC integrates the growth and development efforts of the province's creative industries including Motion Picture, Music and Sound Recording, Interactive and Digital Media, and Book and Magazine Publishing.

The BC Film Commission fell under the Ministry of Community, Sport and Cultural Development. It was founded in 1978 by then-Minister of Tourism Grace McCarthy and film consultant (later commissioner, and producer) Justis Greene, launching with the 1979 film Prophecy.

They operated under a budget of $948,000 for 2010-11. The BC Film Commission and BC Film and Media were merged in April 2013 to become Creative BC. The services of both legacy organizations are offered by Creative BC. www.creativebc.com The BC Film Commission oversees eight regional commissions including Cariboo Chilcotin Coast Tourism, Columbia Shuswap Film Commission, the Greater Victoria Film Commission, Kootenay Film Commission, Northern B.C. Tourism, Okanagan Film Commission, Thompson-Nicola Film Commission and the Vancouver Island North Film Commission. The BC Film Commission was involved in promoting the nickname Hollywood North for Vancouver.

== See also ==
- List of filming locations in Metro Vancouver
- List of filming locations in the BC Interior
- Cinema of Canada
- Canadian pioneers in early Hollywood
- Nicknames of Vancouver
