= Gary Collins (Canadian politician) =

Canadian politician

Minister of Finance of British Columbia
- In office June 5, 2001 – December 15, 2004
- Premier: Gordon Campbell
- Preceded by: Paul Ramsey
- Succeeded by: Colin Hansen

Member of the British Columbia Legislative Assembly for Vancouver-Fairview Vancouver-Little Mountain (1996-2001)
- In office May 28, 1996 – December 15, 2004
- Preceded by: Tom Perry
- Succeeded by: Gregor Robertson

Member of the British Columbia Legislative Assembly for Fort Langley-Aldergrove
- In office October 17, 1991 – May 28, 1996
- Preceded by: Riding established
- Succeeded by: Rich Coleman

Personal details
- Born: August 22, 1963 (age 63) Moose Jaw, Saskatchewan
- Party: BC Liberal
- Spouse: Wendy Cox
- Occupation: pilot; flight instructor

Gary Collins (born August 22, 1963), known as Gary Farrell-Collins until 2001, is a former Canadian politician who served as a member of the Legislative Assembly (MLA) of British Columbia, representing Fort Langley-Aldergrove from 1991 to 1996, Vancouver-Little Mountain from 1996 to 2001, and Vancouver-Fairview from 2001 to 2004. A caucus member of the British Columbia Liberal Party, he served in the cabinet of Premier Gordon Campbell as Minister of Finance from 2001 to 2004. He was also the chief executive officer of Vancouver-based Harmony Airways from 2004 to 2006.

== Biography ==
He was born in Moose Jaw, Saskatchewan to Jack and Kay Collins. After moving to British Columbia, he attended the Fraser Valley College and graduated from the aviation diploma program; he went on to become a flight instructor with that institution. In addition, he studied economics and political science at Simon Fraser University.

He ran in the 1991 provincial election as a BC Liberal candidate in the riding of Fort Langley-Aldergrove, and was elected MLA by a margin of 2,636 votes. For the 1996 election he moved to the riding of Vancouver-Little Mountain, and was re-elected with 50.3% of the vote. In opposition, he served as Official Opposition House Leader and held a variety of critic roles, including labour, investment and finance.

With the Little Mountain riding dissolved and redistributed ahead of the 2001 provincial election, he ran in the newly established riding of Vancouver-Fairview, and was re-elected by a margin of 7,813 votes. The Liberals formed government following that election, and Collins was appointed to the cabinet that June by Premier Gordon Campbell to serve as Minister of Finance; he was also named Government House Leader. For his first budget, Collins raised the provincial sales tax by half a percentage point to 7.5%, and increased tobacco tax and medicare premiums; a $4.4 billion deficit was forecast for that fiscal year. He went on to announce the Liberal government's first balanced budget in 2004.

In December 2004, Collins announced his decision to resign as Minister of Finance and Vancouver-Fairview MLA effective immediately, and became the CEO of Harmony Airways. He left that position in December 2006; the airline ceased operations a few months later. He then became a senior vice-president with Belkorp Industries, before being named president of Coastal Contacts in August 2012.

== Personal life ==
He was first elected under the name Gary Farrell-Collins, and appeared on the ballot in the 2001 provincial election by that name. However, he was sworn in as MLA at the 37th Parliament as "Gary Collins" later that year, after dropping his former wife's last name following their divorce. He later married Wendy Cox, a reporter with The Canadian Press. They have three children together, son Thomas, daughters Claire and Rachel.

== Electoral record ==
1991 British Columbia general election: Fort Langley-Aldergrove
Party	Candidate	Votes	%	Expenditures
Liberal	Gary Farrell-Collins	8,663	43.57	$8,849
New Democratic	Charles Bradford	6,027	30.31	$24,268
Social Credit	Dan Peterson	4,880	24.54	$40,933
Independent	Lila Stanford	227	1.14	$1,203
Western Canada Concept	William White	87	0.44	–
Total valid votes		19,884	100.00	
Total rejected ballots		243	1.21	
Turnout		20,127	77.44	
Source: Legislative Library of British Columbia

1996 British Columbia general election: Vancouver-Little Mountain
Party	Candidate	Votes	%
Liberal	Gary Farrell-Collins	12,036	50.25
New Democratic	Margaret Birrell	9,390	39.20
Progressive Democrat	Ted Phillip Bradley	1,062	4.43
Green	Stuart Parker	714	2.98
Reform	David J. Waine	489	2.04
Independent	Dan Grant	96	0.40
Social Credit	Gerold Kuklinski	85	0.35
Natural Law	Estelle Brooke	82	0.34
Total valid votes		23,954	100.00
Total rejected ballots		184	
Turnout		67.80	
Source: Legislative Library of British Columbia

2001 British Columbia general election: Vancouver-Fairview
Party	Candidate	Votes	%	Expenditures
Liberal	Gary Farrell-Collins	12,864	54.94	$35,510
Green	Vanessa Violini	5,051	21.57	$3,659
New Democratic	Anita Romaniuk	4,772	20.38	$9,902
Marijuana	Ron MacIntyre	651	2.78	$735
People's Front	Brian Sproule	76	0.33	$57
Total valid votes		23,414	100.00	
Total rejected ballots		142	0.61	
Turnout		23,556	64.20	
Source: Legislative Library of British Columbia
