= James Campbell Bury =

Canadian politician (1916–2005)

James Campbell Bury (1916 – October 2005) was a packing house worker and political figure in British Columbia. After being defeated in the 1949 provincial election, he represented Vancouver Centre in the Legislative Assembly of British Columbia in 1952 and 1953 as a Co-operative Commonwealth Federation (CCF) member.

Bury was born in Kamloops, British Columbia and was educated in Vancouver, where he had later moved with his family. Bury was defeated when he ran for reelection to the assembly in 1953. After leaving politics, he worked with the Federation of Free Trade Unions in Africa, the West Indies and Mexico. On his return to Canada, Bury moved to Toronto. In 1962, he became provincial secretary for the Ontario New Democratic Party. He died there in 2005 at the age of 88.
