= BC Paraplegic Association =

Non-profit organization in British Columbia

Spinal Cord Injury BC
- Abbreviation: SCI BC
- Formation: 1945; 81 years ago
- Type: Non-profit organization
- Legal status: Active
- Purpose: advocate and public voice, educator and network
- Headquarters: Vancouver, British Columbia
- Region served: British Columbia, Canada
- Official language: English, French
- Parent organization: Canadian Paraplegic Association
- Website: http://www.sci-bc.ca
- Formerly called: BC Paraplegic Association

Spinal Cord Injury BC (SCI BC), formerly known as the BC Paraplegic Association, is a not-for-profit organization based in British Columbia, Canada, that helps people with spinal cord injuries and related injuries. The organization provides three core services: the Peer program, Information Services and the SCI Information Database.

Spinal Cord Injury BC works in close partnership with the Vancouver General Hospital, G. F. Strong Rehabilitation Centre, International Collaboration On Repair Discoveries (ICORD), Rick Hansen Institute, Neil Squire Foundation, BC Wheelchair Sports (BCWCS) and The Disability Foundation.

== History ==
Spinal Cord Injury BC is a branch of the Canadian Paraplegic Association (CPA). The CPA was founded in 1945 by veterans who had sustained spinal cord injuries in World War II.

The first unit of the Western Society for Physical Rehabilitation opened in 1947 and was renamed the GF Strong Rehabilitation Centre in 1957. The BC Paraplegic Association, the CPA division for British Columbia, was also formed in 1957. It was led by executive director Doug Mowat from 1962 until his death in 1992. In 1959, the association's first employee was hired as a rehabilitation consultant. That same year, the BC Paraplegic Association celebrated its first job placement.

During the 1960s, scholarships were made available to assist individuals with physical disabilities in reaching their post-secondary education goals. The BC Paraplegic Association also helped contributed to worldwide disability education and development in 1969 with its donation of equipment to people with disabilities in developing countries.

Strong promotion by the BC Paraplegic Association to revise the BC Building Code and eliminate stairs as the only means of access to public buildings proved successful in 1973, when the City of Vancouver introduced its new accessibility by-laws. These standards were expanded throughout the province under the BC Building Code in 1979.

The BC Paraplegic Foundation was established in 1975 to support the BC Paraplegic Association and individuals with spinal cord injuries and other mobility-related impairments. The association also extensively consulted in the planning of Vancouver's Expo 86, which was lauded as a showcase for accessibility and high-tech innovations for people with disabilities. In the 1990s, the association worked with BC Transit and was instrumental in the development of the accessible bus program in the Lower Mainland – the first of its kind in Canada.

== Notable people ==
Doug Mowat, the organization's longtime executive director, was the first wheelchair user elected to the Legislative Assembly of British Columbia. In the 2009 provincial election, Stephanie Cadieux, a former director of marketing and development for the association, became the first woman who uses a wheelchair to be elected to the Legislative Assembly.
