= Justis Greene =

Canadian television director and producer

- Occupation: Producer
- Years active: 1982–present
- Notable work: Tron: Legacy; Final Destination 2 Miracle; Snakes on a Plane; Bates Motel

Justis Greene is a Canadian film and television producer. He began his career as British Columbia's first film commissioner, facilitating the filming of First Blood (1982) and Mother Lode (1982). He has produced movies such as A History of Violence, Tron: Legacy and Snakes On A Plane, and television shows such as Bates Motel, The Order, The Outer Limits and Another Life, primarily in Vancouver.

== Career ==
Greene, along with then-Minister of Tourism Grace McCarthy, started and managed the BC Film Commission in 1978, attracting the first film, Prophecy, to kick off the modern "Hollywood North" in Vancouver.

Greene won a Directors Guild of Canada award as part of the team that made A History of Violence in 2006. He was nominated for Gemini Awards for producing The Outer Limits and Neon Rider.

== Filmography ==
=== Film ===
Year	Film	Credit
1988	Ernest Saves Christmas	Co-producer
1993	Another Stakeout	Associate producer
1996	Homeward Bound II: Lost in San Francisco	Co-producer
1998	I'll Be Home for Christmas	Co-producer
1998	Mr. Magoo	Co-producer
2000	Mission to Mars	Co-producer
2002	First Shot	Producer
2002	Brother's Keeper	Producer
2003	Final Destination 2	Co-producer
2004	Miracle	Executive producer
2005	A History of Violence	Executive producer
2006	Snakes On A Plane	Executive producer
2007	The Last Mimzy	Executive producer
2010	Tron: Legacy	Co-producer
2018	The Bad Seed	Producer

=== Television ===
Year	Title	Credit
1992	Neon Rider	Producer
1995	The Outer Limits	Producer
2013-2017	Bates Motel	Producer
2019-2021	Another Life	Producer
2020	The Order	Producer
2022	The Imperfects	Producer
2023	Goosebumps	Producer
