= Manfred McGeer =

Canadian politician (1893–1955)

Member of the Legislative Assembly of British Columbia
- In office 1940–1941
- Preceded by: John Melvin Bryan, Sr.
- Succeeded by: Herbert Gargrave
- Constituency: Mackenzie

Personal details
- Born: November 29, 1893 Langley, British Columbia
- Died: January 22, 1955 (aged 61) Burnaby, British Columbia
- Party: British Columbia Liberal Party
- Spouse: Frances Alida Larson

Manfred McGeer (November 29, 1893 – January 22, 1955) was a Canadian politician. He served in the Legislative Assembly of British Columbia from 1940 to 1941 from the electoral district of Mackenzie, a member of the Liberal party.
