= Vancouver Centre (provincial electoral district) =

Defunct provincial electoral district in British Columbia, Canada

British Columbia electoral district

Defunct provincial electoral district
- Legislature: Legislative Assembly of British Columbia
- First contested: 1933
- Last contested: 1986

Demographics
- Population (2001): 55,510
- Area (km²): 23.77
- Census division: Greater Vancouver
- Census subdivision: Vancouver

Vancouver Centre was a provincial electoral district for the Legislative Assembly of British Columbia, Canada. It was created before the general election of 1933. It and the other new Vancouver ridings that came into existence that year – Vancouver-Burrard, Vancouver-Point Grey and Vancouver East – were created from the old Vancouver City riding, which was a six-member seat. Vancouver Centre was a two-member seat throughout its existence.

A redistribution before the 1991 election dramatically changed Vancouver's long-standing electoral map by eliminating multiple member districts. Vancouver Centre was abolished, with most of the riding being redistributed into Vancouver-Burrard and Vancouver-Mount Pleasant; a small part went to Vancouver-Kingsway.

== Demographics ==
Population, 2001	55,510
Population change, 1931–2001	8.2%
Area (km^{2})	23.77
Population density	2,335

== Notable MLAs ==
- Alexander Small Matthew
- Leslie Raymond Peterson
- Herb Capozzi
- Evan Maurice Wolfe
- Mike Harcourt
- Gary Lauk
- Emery Barnes

== Electoral history 1933–1986 ==
18th British Columbia election, 1933
Party	Candidate	Votes	%	±	Expenditures
Liberal	Gordon McGregor Sloan	6,925	24.45		
Liberal	Gordon Sylvester Wismer	6,723	23.74		
Co-operative Commonwealth Fed.	Wallis Walter LeFeaux	5,352	18.90		
Co-operative Commonwealth Fed.	James Samuel Taylor	5,102	18.01		
Independent Conservative	Daryl Herbert Kent	1,437	5.07		
Independent Conservative	Albert DeBurgo McPhillips	1,304	4.60		
Independent CCF	Gerald Vincent Pelton	407	1.44		
United Front (Workers and Farmers)	Fred Grange	325	1.15		
United Front (Workers and Farmers)	Charles James McKendrick	321	1.13		
Independent CCF	Henry Edward Lyon	293	1.03		
Socialist	Sydney Earp	71	0.25		
Socialist	Rodney J. Young	63	0.22		
Total valid votes		28,323	100.00		
Total rejected ballots		138			

19th British Columbia election, 1937
Party	Candidate	Votes	%	±	Expenditures
Liberal	Gordon Sylvester Wismer	6,444	18.63		
Liberal	Fred Crone	6,377	18.44		
Co-operative Commonwealth Fed.	Matthew Glenday	5,771	16.68		
Co-operative Commonwealth Fed.	Frank Roberts	5,690	16.45		
Conservative	Montague Gregory Caple	4,214	12.18		
Conservative	Adam Smith Johnston	4,047	11.70		
Social Credit League	Paul McDowell Kerr	922	2.67		
Social Constructive	John Towers Burnett	476	1.38		
Social Constructive	Alfred Molineux Lester	415	1.20		
Socialist	James King	234	0.68		
Total valid votes		34,590	100.00		
Total rejected ballots		400			

1941 British Columbia general election
Party	Candidate	Votes	%	Elected
Co-operative Commonwealth	Laura Emma Marshall Jamieson	7,434	17.85	✓
Co-operative Commonwealth	Wallis Walter LeFeaux	7,371	17.70	✓
Liberal	Gordon Sylvester Wismer	6,865	16.48	
Liberal	Edward Allan Jamieson	6,858	16.46	
Conservative	Montague Gregory Caple	6,325	15.18	
Conservative	Albert DeBurgo McPhillips	6,198	14.88	
Socialist Labor	Eric Thomas Reaville	393	0.94	
Victory Without Debt	Mary Louise Bollert	209	0.50	
Total valid votes		41,653	100.00	
Total rejected ballots		445		

1945 British Columbia general election
Party	Candidate	Votes	%	Elected
Coalition	Allan James McDonell	10,976	26.01	✓
Coalition	Gordon Sylvester Wismer	10,878	25.77	✓
Co-operative Commonwealth	Laura Emma Marshall Jamieson	7,549	17.89	
Co-operative Commonwealth	Wallis Walter LeFeaux	7,451	17.65	
Labour Progressive	Nigel Morgan	2,101	4.98	
Labour Progressive	Maurice Rush	1,866	4.42	
Social Credit Alliance	Eric Charles Fitzgerald Martin	511	1.21	
Social Credit Alliance	Carl J. Julson	448	1.06	
Independent Liberal	William Raymond McKay	199	0.47	
Socialist Labor	Horace Warner	122	0.29	
Socialist	Raymond Harold MacLeod	105	0.25	
Total valid votes		42,206	100.00	
Total rejected ballots		154		
Source: Elections BC

1949 British Columbia general election
Party	Candidate	Votes	%	Elected
Coalition	Gordon Sylvester Wismer	14,595	30.25	✓
Coalition	Allan James McDonell	14,576	30.22	✓
Co-operative Commonwealth	James Campbell Bury	9,430	19.55	
Co-operative Commonwealth	Wallis Walter LeFeaux	8,539	17.70	
Social Credit League	John Chmelyk	465	0.96	
Social Credit League	Ernest Ruble	349	0.72	
Socialist Labor	John Alexander Fedoruk	286	0.59	
Total valid votes		48,240	100.00	
Total rejected ballots		996		

For the elimination-ballot elections of 1952 and 1953 the riding's voters were presented with two ballots, one for each seat, with two separate candidate-races:

23rd British Columbia election, 1952 - Vancouver Centre Ballot A ^{1}
Party	Candidate	Votes 1st count	%	Votes final count	%	±%	
Co-operative Commonwealth Fed.	James Campbell Bury	6,912	31.02	9,363	54.06		unknown
Liberal	Anna Ethel Sprott	5,234	23.49	7,956	45.94		unknown
BC Social Credit League	George Churchill Moxham	4,694	21.07	–	–		
Progressive Conservative	Allan James McDonell	4,120	18.49	–	–		unknown
Christian Democratic	Ferdinand Theodor Peters	667	2.99				
Labour Representation Committee	Orville Garfield Braaten	654	2.94	–	–		unknown
Total valid votes		22,281	100.00	17,319	%		
Total rejected ballots		2,119					
Turnout		%					
^{1} Preferential ballot; first and final of five (5) counts only shown.

23rd British Columbia election, 1952 - Vancouver Centre Ballot B ^{2}
Party	Candidate	Votes 1st count	%	Votes final count	%	±%
Co-operative Commonwealth Fed.	Laura Emma Marshall Jamieson	7,350	33.17	9,893	53.80	
Liberal	Gordon Sylvester Wismer	5,394	24.34	8,496	46.20	
Social Credit League	Emil Peter Schafer	4,497	20.29			
Progressive Conservative	Frederick Wellington Taylor	3,951	17.83			
Christian Democratic	James Byrne Reardon	691	3.12			
Socialist	William Harold Holtby	276	1.25			
Total valid votes		22,159	100.00	18,389		
Total rejected ballots		1,901				
^{2} Preferential ballot; first and final of five (5) counts only shown.

24th British Columbia election, 1953 Vancouver Centre Ballot A ^{3}
Party	Candidate	Votes 1st count	%	Votes final count	%	±%	
Social Credit	Alexander Small Matthew	7,066	36.37	9,016	53.75		
Co-operative Commonwealth Fed.	James Campbell Bury	6,238	32.10	7,757	46.25		unknown
Liberal	Anna Ethel Sprott	4,079	20.99	–	–		unknown
Progressive Conservative	Glenholme Ferguson McMaster	971	5.00	–	–		unknown
Labor-Progressive	Mary Chomyn	572	2.94	–	–		
Christian Democratic	Ferdinand Theodor Peters	505	2.60				
Total valid votes		19,431	100.00	16,773	%		
Total rejected ballots		1,638					
Total Registered Voters							
Turnout		%					
^{3} Preferential ballot; first and final of five (5) counts only shown.

24th British Columbia election, 1953 Vancouver Centre Ballot B ^{4}
Party	Candidate	Votes 1st count	%	Votes final count	%	±%	
Social Credit	George Churchill Moxham	6,782	35.48	8,679	52.97		
Co-operative Commonwealth Fed.	Laura Emma Marshall Jamieson	6,283	32.87	7,707	47.03		unknown
Liberal	Michael Leo Sweeney	3,985	20.85	–	–		unknown
Progressive Conservative	Frederick Wellington Taylor	1,007	5.27	–	–		unknown
Labor-Progressive	William Angus Stewart	580	3.03	–	–		
Christian Democratic	James Byrne Reardon	480	2.50				
Total valid votes		19,117	100.00	16,386	%		
Total rejected ballots		1,727					
Total Registered Voters							
Turnout		%					
^{4} Preferential ballot; first and final of five (5) counts only shown.

British Columbia provincial by-election, January 9, 1956 Death of George Churchill Moxham
Party	Candidate	Votes	%
Social Credit	Leslie Raymond Peterson	6,107	46.77
Progressive Conservative	Douglas Jung	3,715	28.45
Co-operative Commonwealth	Dorothy Gretchen Steeves	2,800	21.44
Labor-Progressive	Jack Gillett	435	3.33
Total valid votes		13,057	
Total rejected ballots		325	
Source: Elections BC

25th British Columbia election, 1956
Party	Candidate	Votes	%	±	Expenditures
Social Credit	Leslie Raymond Peterson	9,112	25.10	–	unknown
Social Credit	Alexander Small Matthew	8,614	23.73	–	unknown
Co-operative Commonwealth Fed.	Charles Patrick (Paddy) Neale	4,561	12.56		unknown
Co-operative Commonwealth Fed.	William Giesbrecht	4,393	12.10		unknown
Liberal	James Allen Macdonald	3,996	11.01		unknown
Liberal	Ralph Goodman	3,727	10.27		unknown
Progressive Conservative	Reginald Atherton	969	2.67		unknown
Labor-Progressive	Nigel Morgan	485	1.34		unknown
Labor-Progressive	Jack Gillett	445	1.23		unknown
Total valid votes		36,302	100.00		
Total rejected ballots		168			
Turnout		%			

26th British Columbia election, 1960
Party	Candidate	Votes	%	±	Expenditures
Social Credit	Leslie Raymond Peterson	8,516	20.91	–	unknown
Social Credit	Alexander Small Matthew	8,227	20.20	–	unknown
Co-operative Commonwealth Fed.	Thomas Henry Berger	6,530	16.03		unknown
Co-operative Commonwealth Fed.	William James Dennison	6,378	15.66		unknown
Liberal	Charles Jordan-Knox	3,726	9.15		unknown
Liberal	Henry Greer Castillou	3,724	9.14		unknown
Progressive Conservative	Patrick Lockhart Reid	1,421	3.49		unknown
Progressive Conservative	Lawrence Smith Eckhardt	1,411	3.46		unknown
Labor-Progressive	Maurice Rush	420	1.03		unknown
Communist	Sonia Rutka	380	0.93		unknown
Total valid votes		40,733	100.00		
Total rejected ballots		504			
Turnout		%			

27th British Columbia election, 1963
Party	Candidate	Votes	%	±	Expenditures
Social Credit	Leslie Raymond Peterson	8,060	20.26	–	unknown
Social Credit	Alexander Small Matthew	7,594	19.09	–	unknown
New Democratic	John M. Norris	5,806	14.60		unknown
New Democratic	Fred Vulliamy	5,538	13.92		unknown
Liberal	Thomas Warnett Kennedy	3,477	8.74		unknown
Liberal	Alexander Forst	3,467	8.72		unknown
Progressive Conservative	Harold G. Haggart	2,741	6.89		unknown
Progressive Conservative	Arthur L. Johnson	2,588	6.51		unknown
Communist	Ronald J. Forkin	266	0.67		unknown
Communist	William E. Stewart	240	0.60		unknown
Total valid votes		39,777	100.00		
Total rejected ballots		419			
Turnout		%			

28th British Columbia election, 1966
Party	Candidate	Votes	%	±	Expenditures
Social Credit	Harold Peter (Herb) Capozzi	8,157	21.15	–	unknown
Social Credit	Evan Maurice Wolfe	7,938	20.58	–	unknown
New Democratic	Paul A. Phillips	7,257	18.82		unknown
New Democratic	F.C. Christopher Huddlestan	6,871	17.81		unknown
Liberal	William Griffiths Black	4,147	10.75		unknown
Liberal	Phillip James Lipp	3,803	9.86		unknown
Communist	James William (Jim) Beynon	253	.66		unknown
Independent	Gerard A. Goeujon	144	0.37	unknown	
Total valid votes		38,570	100.00		
Total rejected ballots		432			
Turnout		%			

1969 British Columbia general election
Party	Candidate	Votes	%	Elected
Social Credit	Harold Peter (Herb) Capozzi	10,751	21.78	✓
Social Credit	Evan Maurice Wolfe	10,711	21.70	✓
New Democratic	Emery Oakland Barnes	9,446	19.14	
New Democratic	William Herbert Deverell	9,441	19.13	
Liberal	Daniel Terence Devlin	4,551	9.22	
Liberal	Robert Gary Miller	4,454	9.02	
Total valid votes		49,354	98.84	
Total rejected ballots		528	1.06	
Total votes		49,882		
Registered voters		46,362		

1972 British Columbia general election
Party	Candidate	Votes	%	Elected
New Democratic	Emery Oakland Barnes	12,120	22.68	✓
New Democratic	Gary Vernon Lauk	11,749	21.99	✓
Social Credit	Harold Peter (Herb) Capozzi	10,037	18.78	
Social Credit	Evan Maurice Wolfe	9,908	18.54	
Liberal	Thomas Alexander Kennedy	4,869	9.11	
Liberal	Henry Greer Castillou	4,751	8.89	
Total valid votes		53,434	99.00	
Total rejected ballots		539	1.00	
Total votes		53,973		
Registered voters		47,982		

1975 British Columbia general election
Party	Candidate	Votes	%	Elected
New Democratic	Gary Vernon Lauk	12,846	24.73	✓
New Democratic	Emery Oakland Barnes	12,252	23.59	✓
Social Credit	Harold Peter (Herb) Capozzi	11,253	21.67	
Social Credit	Tin Chao Alan Lau	7,214	13.89	
Independent (Social Credit) (Note: Campaigned as Ind.SC but listed as Independent in Statement of Votes since the Election Act prohibits the use of a recognized party name by Independent candidates.)	Thomas Warnett Kennedy	2,545	4.90	
Liberal	Thomas Smith Hammond	1,949	3.75	
Liberal	Jack Say Yee	1,870	3.60	
Progressive Conservative	Malcolm Caldwell Wright	1,513	2.91	
Independent	David John Bader	191	0.37	
Communist	Michael Christopher Gidora	164	0.32	
Communist	Nicholas Podovinnikoff	140	0.27	
Total valid votes		51,937	98.73	
Total rejected ballots		669	1.27	
Total votes		52,606		
Registered voters		49,500		

1979 British Columbia general election
Party	Candidate	Votes	%	Elected
New Democratic	Gary Vernon Lauk	17,464	28.07	✓
New Democratic	Emery Oakland Barnes	17,361	27.91	✓
Social Credit	Thomas Warnett Kennedy	12,233	19.66	
Social Credit	Richmond Desmond Fitzgerald Kimmitt	11,649	18.73	
Progressive Conservative	Douglas David Henderson	1,511	2.43	
Progressive Conservative	Keith Donald Eady	1,475	2.37	
Communist	Maurice Rush	277	0.45	
Communist	Miguel Figueroa	237	0.38	
Total valid votes		62,207	97.94	
Total rejected ballots		1,310	2.06	
Total votes		63,517		
Registered voters		62,920		

1983 British Columbia general election
Party	Candidate	Votes	%	Elected
New Democratic	Emery Oakland Barnes	18,960	28.70	✓
New Democratic	Gary Vernon Lauk	18,743	28.37	✓
Social Credit	Avril Kim Campbell	12,740	19.28	
Social Credit	Philip W. Owen	12,415	18.79	
Liberal	Shirley McLoughlin	2,084	3.15	
Progressive Conservative	Kevin Baden Bruce	880	1.33	
Communist	Maurice Rush	244	0.37	
Total valid votes		66,066	99.87	
Total rejected ballots		84	0.13	
Total votes		66,150		
Registered voters		53,512		

1986 British Columbia general election
Party	Candidate	Votes	%	Elected
New Democratic	Michael Franklin Harcourt	22,301	31.71	✓
New Democratic	Emery Oakland Barnes	20,885	29.69	✓
Social Credit	Robert Gardner	10,965	15.59	
Social Credit	John Archibald Murchie	10,679	15.18	
Liberal	Steven R. Bourne	2,564	3.65	
Liberal	Vito Palmieri	2,036	2.89	
Green	Gavin L. Ross	446	0.63	
Green	Murray Gudmundson	317	0.45	
People's Front	Brian Keith Sproule	144	0.20	
Total valid votes		70,337	97.85	
Total rejected ballots		1,548	2.15	
Total votes		71,885		
Registered voters		53,858		

== See also ==
- List of British Columbia provincial electoral districts
- Canadian provincial electoral districts
- Vancouver (electoral districts)
