= Doug Mowat =

Canadian politician

MLA for Vancouver-Little Mountain
- In office 1983–1991 Serving with Grace McCarthy
- Preceded by: Evan Maurice Wolfe
- Succeeded by: Tom Perry

Personal details
- Born: Douglas Lyle Mowat; May 16, 1929 Vancouver, British Columbia, Canada
- Died: August 11, 1992 (aged 63) Vancouver, British Columbia, Canada
- Party: Social Credit

Douglas Lyle Mowat (May 16, 1929 – August 11, 1992) was a Canadian politician, who served as a Social Credit Member of the Legislative Assembly of British Columbia from 1983 to 1991, representing the riding of Vancouver-Little Mountain. He was defeated in his bid for a third term when he ran in the 1991 provincial election in the new riding of Vancouver-Quilchena. A quadriplegic following an accident playing rugby at age 17, Mowat was the first wheelchair user elected to a legislature in Canada.

A founding member of the BC Paraplegic Association, he was the organization's executive director from 1962 until his death. He was named a member of the Order of Canada in 1982 in honour of his work on behalf of people with disabilities. Mowat first entered elected politics as a Vancouver Parks Board commissioner, and subsequently was elected to the legislature in 1983.

On October 3, 1989, Mowat and three colleagues — Graham Bruce, Duane Delton Crandall, and David Mercier — quit the governing Social Credit caucus to sit as "Independent Social Credit" members. In a joint statement, the four stressed that they "in no way desire[d] the fall of our government", but wished to spur an "open and realistic assessment" of Bill Vander Zalm's continued leadership. Mowat returned the Socred caucus on February 14, 1990, alongside Bruce and Mercier (Crandall had already rejoined caucus in January). Mowat explained his move by saying he was satisfied that Vander Zalm was no longer centralizing decision-making.

Mowat died in August 1992.
