= Tom Perry (politician) =

Canadian politician

Doctor Tom Perry
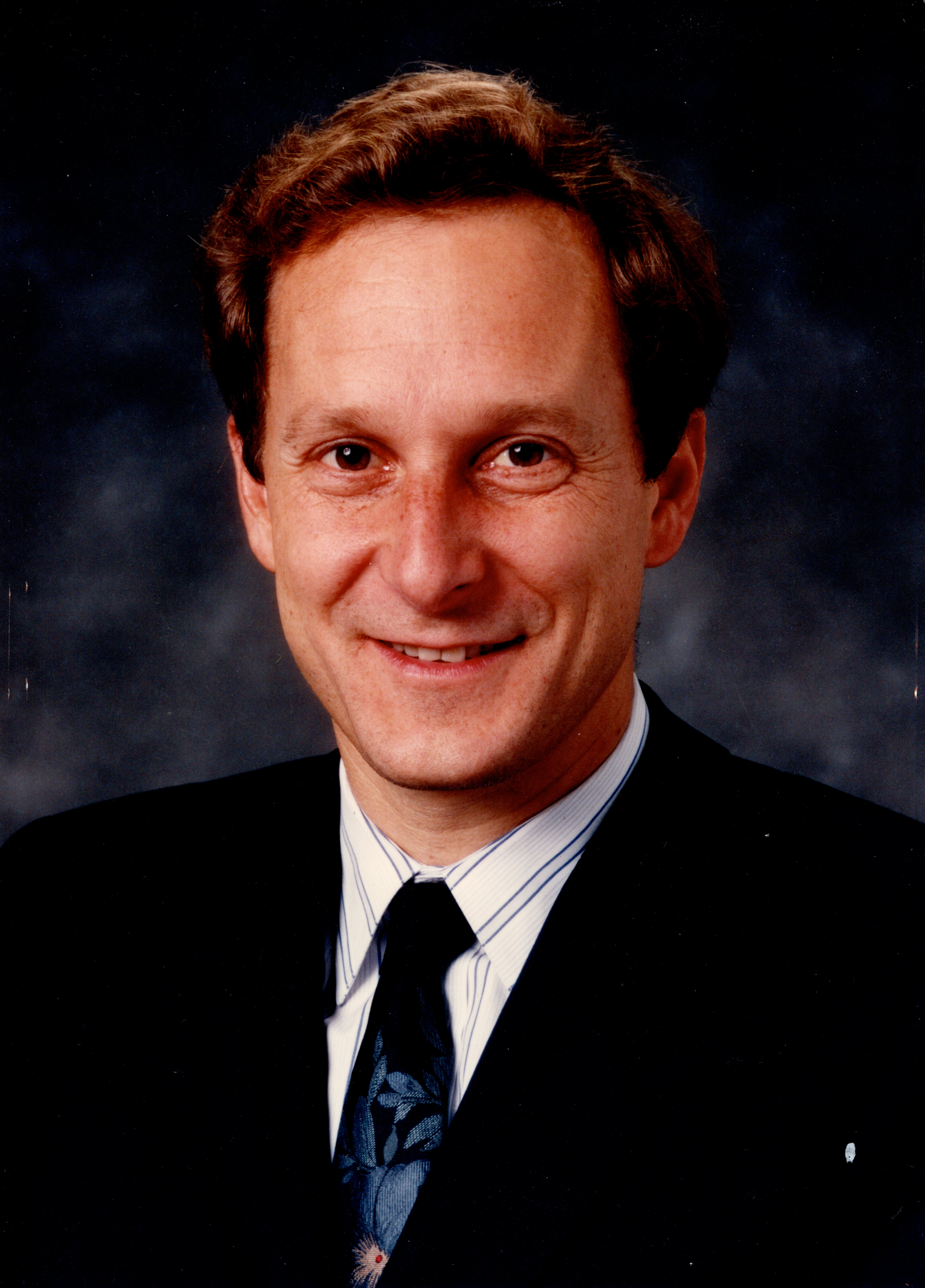

Member of the British Columbia Legislative Assembly for Vancouver-Little Mountain
- In office October 17, 1991 – May 28, 1996
- Preceded by: Grace McCarthy; Doug Mowat
- Succeeded by: Gary Farrell-Collins

Member of the British Columbia Legislative Assembly for Vancouver-Point Grey
- In office March 15, 1989 – October 17, 1991 Serving with Darlene Marzari
- Preceded by: Kim Campbell
- Succeeded by: Darlene Marzari

Personal details
- Born: 1950 or 1951 (age 74–75)
- Party: New Democrat

Tom Perry is a former Canadian politician. He served as an MLA in the Legislative Assembly of British Columbia from 1989 to 1996, as a member of the British Columbia New Democratic Party.

== Biography ==
He qualified as a doctor. Perry was first elected to the Legislative Assembly in a by-election in Vancouver-Point Grey in 1989 after Kim Campbell had resigned from the legislature to run in the 1988 federal election. At the time, Vancouver-Point Grey was a multiple-member district, and Perry served alongside Darlene Marzari.

During the 1991 election, which was contested under new single-member boundaries, Marzari was the NDP candidate in Vancouver-Point Grey, and Perry stood in Vancouver-Little Mountain, where he was re-elected. Perry was the minister for advanced education, training, and technology as well as the minister responsible for youth from 1991 to 1993. He did not run in the 1996 election, and was succeeded by Gary Farrell-Collins.

He subsequently returned to medicine and taught clinical pharmacology at Vancouver General Hospital and UBC Hospital.

== Electoral record ==
35th British Columbia election, 1991 (Note: Seat reduced to one member from two)
Party	Candidate	Votes	%	±	Expenditures
New Democratic	Tom Perry	10,383	45.43%		unknown
Liberal	Michael K. Stebner	8,180	35.79%		unknown
Social Credit	Sharon E. White	3,944	17.26%	–	unknown
Green	Geoff Berner	259	1.13%	–	unknown
Independent	Cheryl M. Maczko	90	0.39%		unknown
Total valid votes		22,856	100.00%		
Total rejected ballots		562			
Turnout		69.44%			

British Columbia provincial by-election, March 15, 1989: Vancouver-Point Grey Resignation of Kim Campbell
Party	Candidate	Votes	%	±%
New Democratic	Tom Perry	14,132	52.91	–
Social Credit	Michael Levy	6,435	24.09	–
Liberal	Gordon Wilson	5,449	20.40	–
Green	Valerie Parker	535	2.00	–
Independent	Bob Seeman	77	0.29	–
Libertarian	Mary Anne Nylen	58	0.22	–
Human Race	Louis Lesosky	16	0.06	–
New Populist	Gerald Kirby	8	0.03	–
Total valid votes		26,710	99.64	–
Total rejected ballots		96	0.36	–
Turnout		26,806	46.37	–
Eligible voters		57,813	–	
New Democratic gain		Swing		–
Source: Elections BC
