= Grace McCarthy =

Canadian politician (1927-2017)

Grace McCarthy OC OBC
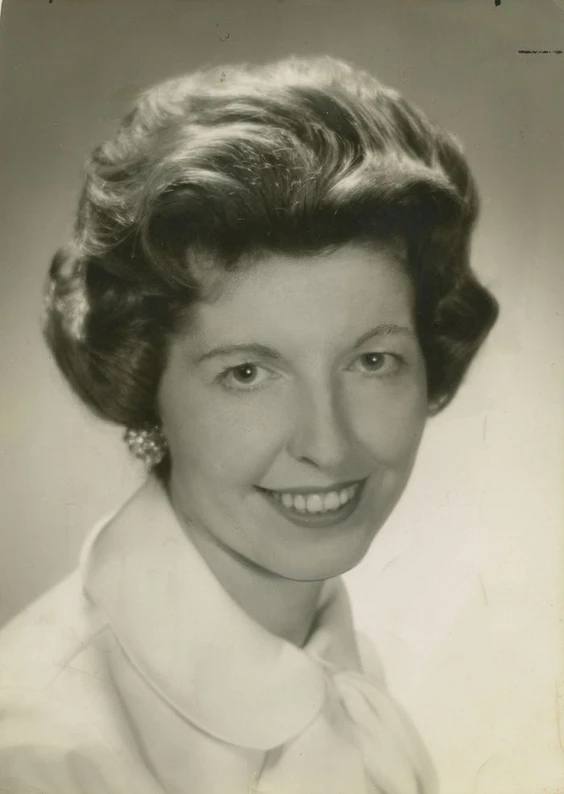
- McCarthy in 1966

Deputy Premier of British Columbia
- In office August 14, 1986 – November 6, 1986
- Premier: Bill Vander Zalm
- Preceded by: Herself
- Succeeded by: Rita Johnston (1990)
- In office December 22, 1975 – May 26, 1983
- Premier: Bill Bennett
- Preceded by: Eileen Dailly
- Succeeded by: Herself

Leader of the British Columbia Social Credit Party
- In office November 6, 1993 – May 1994
- Preceded by: Jack Weisgerber
- Succeeded by: Lyall Hanson

Member of the Legislative Assembly for Vancouver-Little Mountain
- In office December 11, 1975 – October 17, 1991 Serving with Evan Maurice Wolfe (1975-1983); Doug Mowat (1983-1991)
- Preceded by: Phyllis Young; Roy Cummings
- Succeeded by: Tom Perry
- In office September 12, 1966 – August 30, 1972 Serving with Leslie Peterson
- Preceded by: Riding Established
- Succeeded by: Phyllis Young; Roy Cummings

Personal details
- Born: Grace Mary Winterbottom; October 14, 1927 Grace Hospital, Vancouver, British Columbia
- Died: May 24, 2017 (aged 89) Vancouver, British Columbia
- Party: Social Credit
- Spouse: Ray McCarthy
- Children: 2
- Occupation: Florist
- Nickname: Amazing Grace

Grace Mary McCarthy, OC, OBC (née Winterbottom; October 14, 1927 – May 24, 2017) was a Canadian politician and florist who was a member of the Legislative Assembly of British Columbia from 1975 to 1991. A leader of the Social Credit Party of British Columbia, she was largely responsible for rebuilding that party after its defeat in the 1972 provincial election.

== Political career ==
In the 1960s, McCarthy was a popular elected member of the City of Vancouver Parks Board and instrumental in the creation of the VanDusen Botanical Gardens. She was actively recruited to run for a seat in the provincial Legislature by then-premier W.A.C. Bennett. In an attempt to improve his hold on power, Bennett promised that any woman elected to the legislature while he was in power would become a member of his Cabinet. In 1966, she successfully campaigned and was elected along with Les Peterson to co-represent the dual member riding of Vancouver-Little Mountain. Bennett made McCarthy a minister without portfolio, as well as Pat Jordan and Isabel Dawson.

In 1968, she successfully lobbied both the Canadian federal and British Columbian provincial governments to broaden home ownership credit legislation to include single, divorced and widowed women without the need for a male guarantor.

In the 1972 general election, the Socreds suffered its first electoral defeat to the New Democratic Party (NDP). McCarthy, then Socred party president in 1973, worked to rebuild the party. To that end, she increased membership in the party from 5,000 to 70,000 in two years. After the Socreds returned to power in the 1975 election, McCarthy became a senior cabinet minister, serving in a variety of portfolios, under Premier Bill Bennett.

In 1978, McCarthy was suspected of interfering in the re-drawing of the electoral boundaries of her Little Mountain constituency, to include an appendage of a wealthy west side area of Vancouver, helping ensure her electoral success. This appendage and subsequent scandal became known as "Gracie's Finger". The actual area in question was between 16th and 33rd Avenues in Vancouver around the Arbutus Street corridor. In 1986, she parlayed the idea to illuminate the main cables of Vancouver's Lions Gate Bridge and arranged private-sector sponsorship by the Guinness family, the bridge's builders and original owners.

In addition, her many achievements included the following: lobbied to bring Expo 86 to Vancouver; established Canada's first linear parkway and SkyTrain; negotiated lighting on the Lions Gate Bridge; spearheaded construction of the Vancouver Trade & Convention Centre at Canada Harbour Place; initiated Canada's first toll-free help line for abused children; brought the most comprehensive legislation to stop child abuse in the country; and initiated, alongside Justis Greene, BC's first film promotion office, the Creative BC Film Commission.

=== Leadership contender ===
After Bennett stepped down in 1986, McCarthy stood in the 1986 leadership election to succeed him. She placed third, behind Brian Smith and victor Bill Vander Zalm. In Vander Zalm's initial cabinet, she was named Deputy Premier of British Columbia and Minister of Economic Development. However, in a shuffle following the 1986 election, McCarthy gained responsibility for international trade, but lost the deputy premier title, which she admitted left her a little disappointed.

On July 6, 1988, McCarthy resigned from cabinet, in protest of Vander Zalm's leadership and the interference of "arrogant" civil servants in the premier's office. Her resignation came just one week after Brian Smith had also resigned in protest of Vander Zalm's leadership style.

After a series of scandals and discontent within caucus led to Vander Zalm's resignation in 1991, McCarthy entered the 1991 leadership election to succeed him. Though considered the frontrunner in the contest, she was defeated in an upset by Rita Johnston, a Vander Zalm loyalist. NDP leader Mike Harcourt further stirred the pot by claiming that he preferred Johnston over McCarthy, asserting his belief that the latter would be a much tougher opponent in an election. Johnston lost the 1991 provincial election badly, with the party only winning third-place status in the legislature, behind the resurgent Liberal Party. Johnston lost her own seat and resigned as leader shortly thereafter. McCarthy was chosen to replace her at the 1993 leadership election.

Though finally achieving her goal of becoming the leader of the Social Credit party, McCarthy struggled as leader. First off, she unexpectedly lost her by-election in Matsqui, a stalwart Social Credit riding, to Liberal candidate Mike de Jong. Next, the Social Credit lost official party status in the BC Legislature when four of the remaining six MLAs left the party to join the fledgling BC Reform Party, rather than work with her as the leader. By 1994, after failing to get any semblance of control over the party, she resigned. In the 1996 election the Socreds lost all their remaining seats, never to return.

== Honours ==
In 1992, she was made an Officer of the Order of Canada. In 2004, she was awarded the Order of British Columbia.

== Death ==
McCarthy died on May 24, 2017, at age 89 after a lengthy battle with a brain tumour.

== Volunteer work ==
Prior to her death, McCarthy was Chairman of the Board of Directors of the CH.I.L.D. Foundation (Children with Intestinal and Liver Disorders). McCarthy began the charity in 1995 with Mary McCarthy Parsons (her daughter) and J. Lindsay Gordon.
