= Time and Chance (Campbell book) =

1996 memoir by Kim Campbell

- First edition cover
- Author: Kim Campbell
- Language: English
- Subject: Kim Campbell
- Publisher: Doubleday Canada
- Publication date: April 1, 1996
- Publication place: Canada
- Media type: Paperback
- Pages: 434
- ISBN: 0-385-25527-6
- OCLC: 34985508
- LC Class: F1034.3.C34 A3 1996

Time and Chance: The Political Memoirs of Canada's First Woman Prime Minister (1996) is a memoir by Kim Campbell, former Prime Minister of Canada.

The book details Campell's career from her first election to the Vancouver School Board in 1983 to becoming the Prime Minister of Canada in 1993, as well as some details about her childhood and family. It ends just after her resignation as Progressive Conservative Party leader after their defeat in the 1993 election. Many of its details are based on a journal kept by Campbell's stepdaughter during her election campaign. The book primarily blames party strategists Allan Gregg and John Tory for the failure of the party in the election.
