= George Churchill Moxham =

Canadian politician

George Churchill Moxham (February 18, 1892 – November 10, 1955) was a businessman and political figure in British Columbia. After an unsuccessful bid in the 1952 provincial election, he represented Vancouver Centre in the Legislative Assembly of British Columbia from 1953 to 1955 as a Social Credit member.

He was born in Halifax, Nova Scotia and came to Vancouver while still young. For a time, Moxham managed a life insurance company in Saskatoon. Before his election to the assembly, Moxham had served on municipal councils in Alberta. He died in office in Vancouver at the age of 63 while recovering from surgery.
