= James Lyle Telford =

Canadian politician (1889–1960)

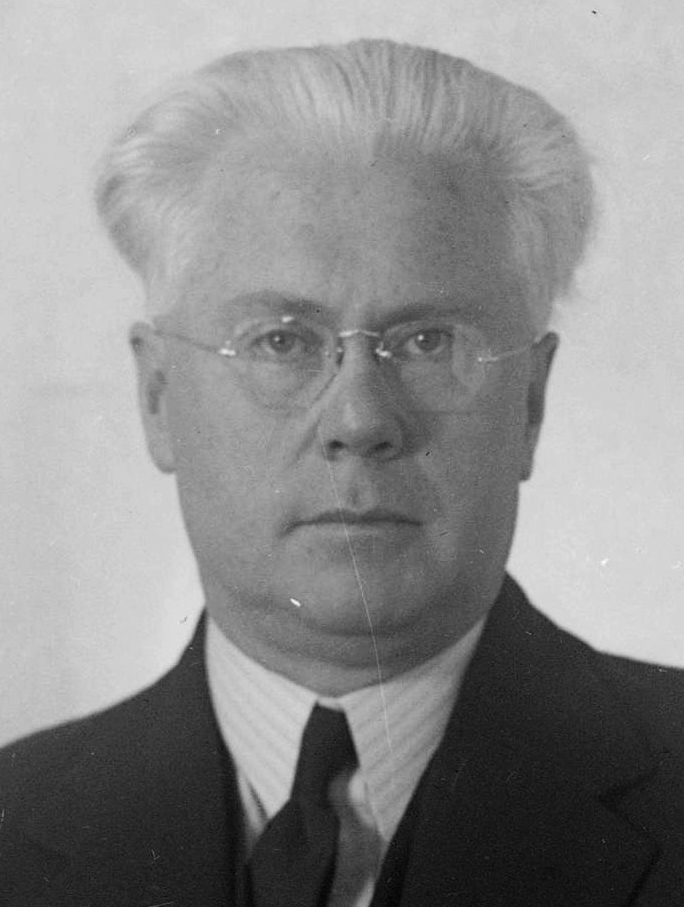
Telford c. 1930s

James Lyle Telford (21 June 1889 – 27 September 1960) was the 24th mayor of Vancouver, British Columbia from 1939 to 1940, a founder of the British Columbia branch of the Co-operative Commonwealth Federation (CCF) and an CCF MLA from 1937 to 1941. He was born in Valens, Ontario.

After being defeated in the 1933 provincial election and a 1936 provincial byelection, Telford was elected to the Legislative Assembly of British Columbia as a CCF representative for Vancouver East in the 1937 provincial election. Running as an independent labour candidate, he was defeated for reelection in the 1941 provincial election.

While serving in the Legislature, he campaigned for the post of Vancouver's mayor in late 1938. He defeated the incumbent mayor George Clark Miller by approximately 2000 votes. A total of seven mayoral candidates split the right-wing vote. Telford did not maintain CCF party membership as mayor, maintaining that political parties should not be a part of municipal politics. He was a medical doctor by profession.

International Brigades veteran Ronald Liversedge claimed Telford assisted multiple individuals with passport applications enabling them to travel to fight for the Second Spanish Republic in the Spanish Civil War. In February 1939 while serving as the mayor of Vancouver, Telford gave a speech welcoming a contingent of such returning volunteers, which was unusual for elected officials in Canada.

== See also ==
- Helena Gutteridge
