= Emery Barnes =

US-born Canadian professional football player and politician

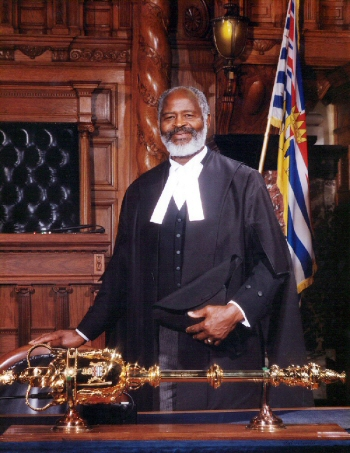

31st Speaker of the Legislative Assembly of British Columbia
- In office March 22, 1994 – May 27, 1996
- Preceded by: Joan Sawicki
- Succeeded by: Dale Lovick

Deputy Speaker of the Legislative Assembly of British Columbia
- In office March 17, 1992 – March 22, 1994
- Preceded by: Austin Pelton
- Succeeded by: Dale Lovick

Member of the British Columbia Legislative Assembly for Vancouver-Burrard
- In office October 17, 1991 – May 28, 1996
- Preceded by: Riding Established
- Succeeded by: Tim Stevenson

Member of the British Columbia Legislative Assembly for Vancouver Centre
- In office August 30, 1972 – October 17, 1991 Serving with Gary Lauk (1972-1986); Mike Harcourt (1986-1991)
- Preceded by: Herb Capozzi; Evan Maurice Wolfe
- Succeeded by: Riding Abolished

Personal details
- Born: December 15, 1929 New Orleans, Louisiana, United States
- Died: June 1, 1998 (aged 68) Vancouver, British Columbia, Canada
- Party: British Columbia New Democratic Party
- Occupation: Social Worker

Emery Oakland Barnes (December 15, 1929 – June 1, 1998) was a Canadian professional football player and politician.

== Background ==
Born in Louisiana and moved to Oregon at the age of 12, Barnes was a gifted athlete, and was an alternate high jumper for the 1952 US Olympic Track and Field team. He played football at the University of Oregon (from where he received his B.Sc in history) He emigrated to Canada in 1957. He studied at the University of British Columbia, where he received a Bachelor of Social Work. Emery Barnes was selected by the National Football League's Green Bay Packers in the 1954 NFL draft (10th round, 207th overall). He played two games for the Packers in 1956, but had much more success in the Canadian Football League with the B.C. Lions. He played 3 years, from 1962 to 1964, for a total of 30 games and was a Grey Cup champion in 1964 (though an injury prevented him from playing in the Grey Cup game).

== Political career ==
Barnes worked as a social worker before entering politics. An unsuccessful candidate in the 1969 provincial election, he was first elected to the British Columbia legislature in 1972 alongside former MLA Gary Lauk, and re-elected five consecutive times (1975,1979, 1983 etc.), he served the people of British Columbia until 1996. Barnes and fellow NDP MLA Rosemary Brown were the first black politicians elected to a legislative office in British Columbia in the 20th century. He was particularly concerned with issues relating to social justice, human rights, and poverty.

Elected Speaker of the Legislature in 1994, Barnes was also the first black person to hold this position in any Canadian province.

The city of Vancouver has named a park after him in his memory, Emery Barnes Park at 1100 Seymour Street.

Barnes is buried in Robinson Memorial Park Cemetery, in Coquitlam, British Columbia. The headstone shows his full name as "Emery Oakland Barnes."

Constance Barnes, his daughter, was an elected member of the Vancouver Park Board and stood for the 2015 federal election with the NDP in the riding of Vancouver Centre.
