= Vancouver-Little Mountain =

Provincial electoral district in British Columbia, Canada

British Columbia electoral district
- Location in Vancouver

Provincial electoral district
- Legislature: Legislative Assembly of British Columbia
MLA
Christine Boyle
New Democratic
- District created: 2023
- First contested: 2024
- Last contested: 2026

Demographics
- Census division: Metro Vancouver
- Census subdivision: Vancouver

Vancouver-Little Mountain is a provincial electoral district in the Canadian province of British Columbia.

It first appeared on the hustings in the general election of 1966 as a two-member seat. It returned as a two-member seat until 1986 and became a one-member seat thereafter. After the 1996 election, the areas it comprised were redistributed. Successor ridings, roughly, were Vancouver-Fraserview, Vancouver-Mount Pleasant, Vancouver-Fairview and Vancouver-Langara.

Under the new representation order of the 2021 British Columbia electoral redistribution approved in 2023, the Vancouver-Little Mountain name was revived, with the new electoral district taking territory from the existing Vancouver-Mount Pleasant, Vancouver-Fairview, Vancouver-False Creek, Vancouver-Langara, and Vancouver-Kensington ridings.

In the 2024 British Columbia general election, it was won by NDP candidate Christine Boyle.

== Members of the Legislative Assembly ==
=== Dual-member district ===
Assembly	Years	Seat 1		Seat 2	
Assembly	Years	Member	Party	Member	Party
Riding created from Vancouver East and Vancouver-Point Grey
28th	1966–1969	Leslie Raymond Peterson	Social Credit	Grace Mary McCarthy	Social Credit
29th	1969–1972	Leslie Raymond Peterson	Social Credit	Grace Mary McCarthy	Social Credit
30th	1972–1975	Phyllis Florence Young	NDP	Roy Thomas Cummings	NDP
31st	1975–1979	Grace Mary McCarthy	Social Credit	Evan Maurice Wolfe	Social Credit
32nd	1979–1983	Grace Mary McCarthy	Social Credit	Evan Maurice Wolfe	Social Credit
33rd	1983–1986	Grace Mary McCarthy	Social Credit	Doug Mowat	Social Credit
34th	1986–1991	Grace Mary McCarthy	Social Credit	Doug Mowat	Social Credit

=== Single-member district ===
Assembly	Years	Member	Party
35th	1991–1996	Tom Perry	New Democratic
36th	1996–2001	Gary Farrell-Collins	Liberal
Riding dissolved into Vancouver-Fairview, Vancouver-Fraserview, Vancouver-Langara, and Vancouver-Mount Pleasant
Riding re-created from Vancouver-False Creek, Vancouver-Fairview, Vancouver-Kensington, Vancouver-Langara, and Vancouver-Mount Pleasant
43rd	2024–2026	Christine Boyle	New Democratic
44th	2026–present	Christine Boyle	New Democratic

== Electoral history (2024–present) ==
2026 British Columbia general election
Party	Candidate	Votes	%	±%	Expenditures
New Democratic	Christine Boyle	10,145	49.04	-13.07	
Conservative	Alex Muir	7,075	34.20	+3.60	
Green	Sarah MacLeod	3,424	16.55	+9.27	
Total valid votes		20,688	99.79		
Total rejected ballots		44	0.21		
Turnout					
Registered voters					
New Democratic hold		Swing		-8.33	
Source: Elections BC

2024 British Columbia general election
Party	Candidate	Votes	%	±%	Expenditures
New Democratic	Christine Boyle	15,636	62.11	+11.2	
Conservative	John Coupar	7,704	30.60	+30.4	
Green	Wendy Hayko	1,833	7.28	−7.4	
Total valid votes		25,173	–		
Total rejected ballots		61			
Turnout		25,234	61.16		
Registered voters		41,259			
New Democratic hold		Swing			
Source: Elections BC

2020 provincial election redistributed results
Party	%
New Democratic	50.9
Liberal	33.3
Green	14.7
Conservative	0.2
Others	0.9

== Student vote results ==
Student Vote Canada is a non-partisan program that holds mock elections in Canadian elementary and high schools alongside general elections, with the same candidates and electoral system.

2024 British Columbia general election
Party	Candidate	Votes	%	±%
New Democratic	Christine Boyle	910	54.17	–
Conservative	John Coupar	423	25.18	–
Green	Wendy Hayko	347	20.65	–
Total valid votes		1,680	100.0	–
Source: Student Vote Canada

== Electoral history (1966–2001) ==
1996 British Columbia general election
Party	Candidate	Votes	%
Liberal	Gary Farrell-Collins	12,036	50.25
New Democratic	Margaret Birrell	9,390	39.20
Progressive Democrat	Ted Phillip Bradley	1,062	4.43
Green	Stuart Parker	714	2.98
Reform	David J. Waine	489	2.04
Independent	Dan Grant	96	0.40
Social Credit	Gerold Kuklinski	85	0.35
Natural Law	Estelle Brooke	82	0.34
Total valid votes		23,954	100.00
Total rejected ballots		184	
Turnout		67.80	
Source: Legislative Library of British Columbia

35th British Columbia election, 1991 (Note: Seat reduced to one member from two)
Party	Candidate	Votes	%	±	Expenditures
New Democratic	Tom Perry	10,383	45.43%		unknown
Liberal	Michael K. Stebner	8,180	35.79%		unknown
Social Credit	Sharon E. White	3,944	17.26%	–	unknown
Green	Geoff Berner	259	1.13%	–	unknown
Independent	Cheryl M. Maczko	90	0.39%		unknown
Total valid votes		22,856	100.00%		
Total rejected ballots		562			
Turnout		69.44%			

34th British Columbia election, 1986
Party	Candidate	Votes	%	±	Expenditures
Social Credit	Grace Mary McCarthy	18,049	22.15%	–	unknown
Social Credit	Doug Mowat	15,962	19.58%	–	unknown
New Democratic	Colin Patrick Kelly	15,717	19.28%		unknown
New Democratic	Adrienne Hazel Peacock	15,407	18.90%		unknown
Liberal	Arthur John Lee	10,627	13.04%		unknown
Liberal	Joyce E. Statton	5,498	6.75%		unknown
People's Front	Dorothy Jean O'Donnell	128	0.16%		
People's Front	Allan H. Bezanson	111	O.14%		
Total valid votes		81,499	100.00%		
Total rejected ballots		1,219			
Turnout		%			

33rd British Columbia election, 1983
Party	Candidate	Votes	%	±	Expenditures
Social Credit	Grace Mary McCarthy	20,578	25.18%	–	unknown
Social Credit	Doug Mowat	20,400	24.96%	–	unknown
New Democratic	Jean Swanson	18,943	23.18%		unknown
New Democratic	Gerry Scott	18,822	23.03%		unknown
Liberal	William Pike Hopes	1,600	1.96%		unknown
Liberal	Frank Arthur F.J. Jones	1,381	1.69%		unknown
Total valid votes		81,724	100.00%		
Total rejected ballots		805			
Turnout		%			

32nd British Columbia election, 1979
Party	Candidate	Votes	%	±	Expenditures
Social Credit	Grace Mary McCarthy	19,350	27.11%	–	unknown
Social Credit	Evan Maurice Wolfe	18,689	26.18%	–	unknown
New Democratic	Michael Franklin Harcourt	17,009	23.83%		unknown
New Democratic	Jean Swanson	16,329	22.88%		unknown
Total valid votes		71,377	100.00%		
Total rejected ballots		1,143			
Turnout		%			

31st British Columbia election, 1975
Party	Candidate	Votes	%	±	Expenditures
Social Credit	Grace Mary McCarthy	15,627	26.62%	–	unknown
Social Credit	Evan Maurice Wolfe	15,313	26.08%	–	unknown
New Democratic	Phyllis Florence Young	12,000	20.44%		unknown
New Democratic	Roy Thomas Cummings	11,587	19.74%		unknown
Liberal	James Bruce Siemens	1,518	2.58%		unknown
Liberal	Beverley E. Joyce Ballantyne	1,369	2.33%		unknown
Progressive Conservative	William Allan Brown	697	1.19%		unknown
Progressive Conservative	Eric Henry Burgoyne	599	1.02%		unknown
Total valid votes		58,710	100.00%		
Total rejected ballots		595			
Turnout		%			

30th British Columbia election, 1972
Party	Candidate	Votes	%	±	Expenditures
New Democratic	Phyllis Florence Young	11,822	20.06%		unknown
New Democratic	Roy Thomas Cummings	11,761	19.96%		unknown
Social Credit	Leslie Raymond Peterson	11,219	19.04%	–	unknown
Social Credit	Grace Mary McCarthy	11,109	18.85%	–	unknown
Liberal	Richard John Joseph Durante	3,874	6.57%		unknown
Liberal	David Baird Penfield Gibson	3,854	6.54%		unknown
Progressive Conservative	Reginald David Grandison	2,358	4.00%		unknown
Progressive Conservative	William Allan Brown	2,295	3.89%		unknown
Independent	David John Bader	253	0.43%		unknown
Communist	Homer Stevens	158	0.27%		unknown
Communist	James William (Jim) Beynon	122	0.21%		unknown
Independent	Gordon James Turner	101	0.17%		unknown
Total valid votes		58,926	100.00%		
Total rejected ballots		417			
Turnout		%			

29th British Columbia election, 1969
Party	Candidate	Votes	%	±	Expenditures
Social Credit	Leslie Raymond Peterson	14,292	25.47%	–	unknown
Social Credit	Grace Mary McCarthy	14,044	25.03%	–	unknown
New Democratic	Richard Melville Rockwell	9,020	16.07%		unknown
New Democratic	Dennis Frank Mulroney	8,913	15.88%		unknown
Liberal	Peter Hector Pearse	4,994	8.90%		unknown
Liberal	Robert Harry Beattie	4,851	8.64%		unknown
Total valid votes		56,114	100.00%		
Total rejected ballots		345			
Turnout		%			

28th British Columbia election, 1966
Party	Candidate	Votes	%	±	Expenditures
Social Credit	Leslie Raymond Peterson	12,380	24.74%	–	unknown
Social Credit	Grace Mary McCarthy	11,566	23.11%	–	unknown
New Democratic	Joseph Hardcastle Corsbie	8,620	17.23%		unknown
New Democratic	Robert Eugene Clair	8,523	17.03%		unknown
Liberal	Edward Charles Sweeney	4,681	9.35%		unknown
Liberal	Jean Margaret Crowley	4,270	8.53%		unknown
Total valid votes		50,040	100.00%		
Total rejected ballots		455			
Turnout		%			

After the 1996 election the Vancouver-Little Mountain riding was redistributed. Successor ridings, roughly, are Vancouver-Fraserview, Vancouver-Mount Pleasant, Vancouver-Fairview, and Vancouver-Langara.

== See also ==
- List of British Columbia provincial electoral districts
- Canadian provincial electoral districts
