= Gary Lauk =

Canadian politician (1940–2022)

Gary Lauk QC
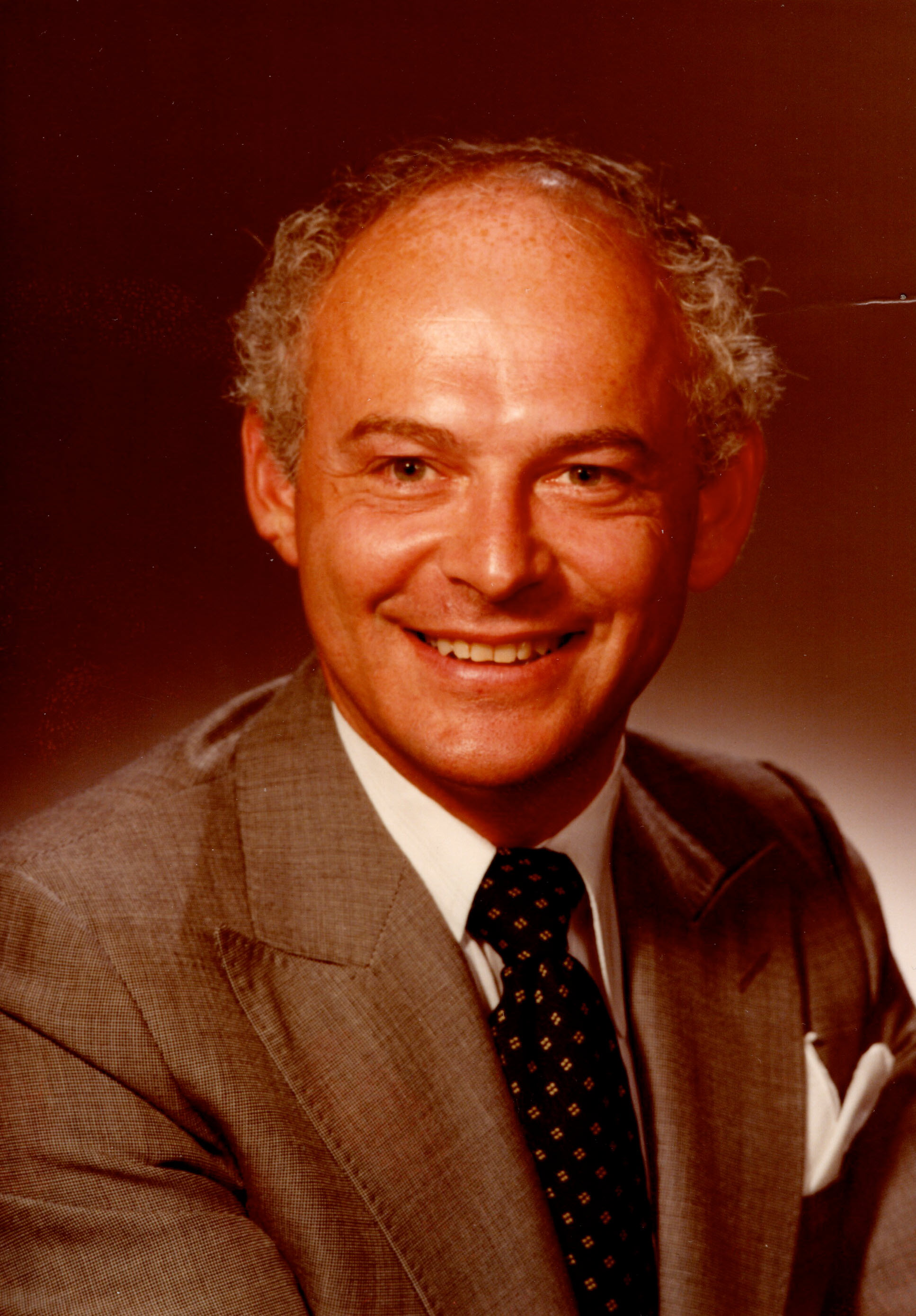

Member of the British Columbia Legislative Assembly for Vancouver Centre
- In office August 30, 1972 – October 22, 1986 Serving with Emery Barnes
- Preceded by: Herb Capozzi; Evan Wolfe
- Succeeded by: Michael Harcourt

Personal details
- Born: Gary Vernon Lauk; September 7, 1940 Vancouver, British Columbia, Canada
- Died: November 21, 2022 (aged 82) Vancouver, British Columbia, Canada
- Party: British Columbia New Democratic Party

Gary Vernon Lauk, QC (born September 7, 1940 – November 21, 2022) was a lawyer and former political figure in British Columbia. He represented Vancouver Centre in the Legislative Assembly of British Columbia from 1972 to 1986 as a New Democratic Party (NDP) member. He has practised criminal law, personal injury law, commercial law, and insurance litigation. Gary V. Lauk was awarded a Queens Counsel (QC).

He is the son of Edward Lauk. Gary Lauk was educated in Vancouver, New Westminster and at the University of British Columbia. He served in the provincial cabinet as Minister of Industrial Development, Trade and Commerce, as Minister of Economic Development, and as Minister of Mines and Petroleum Resources. Lauk did not seek reelection in 1986 in order to allow Mike Harcourt to be a candidate in his riding (Harcourt was elected to the assembly). He was a member of the board of the Trial Lawyers of B.C. and of the board of Corpus Christi College at UBC. Lauk died on November 21, 2022.
