= Fred Crone =

Canadian politician (1879–1939)

Fred Crone (October 28, 1879 – April 3, 1939) was a businessman and political figure in British Columbia, Canada. He represented Vancouver Centre in the Legislative Assembly of British Columbia from 1937 to 1939 as a Liberal.

== Biography ==
He was born in Warwick, Ontario and educated in Watford and Strathroy. After taking an officer's training course in London, Ontario, he served with the Royal Canadian Regiment in Halifax. Crone came to Vancouver in 1902. He worked as a dishwasher, stevedore and as a logger. Crone then became a partner in a poultry-raising operation. He sold his share in that business and established the Crone Moving & Storage company. Crone served on Vancouver City council from 1920 to 1923 and from 1936 to 1939 and on the city's Park Board from 1929 to 1936. He placed second in the 1929 Vancouver mayoralty race. Crone also served as chairman of the Greater Vancouver Publicity bureau and president of the Puget Sounders and British Columbians Associated, an organization aimed at promoting tourism in the region.

Fred Crone married Leona Blanche Henry on April 19, 1905. They had one son, Wilbert Henry Crone, who eventually took over the family moving and storage business.

Fred Crone died in office of a heart attack while playing golf in Vancouver on April 3, 1939, at the age of 59.
