= Alexander Small Matthew =

Canadian politician

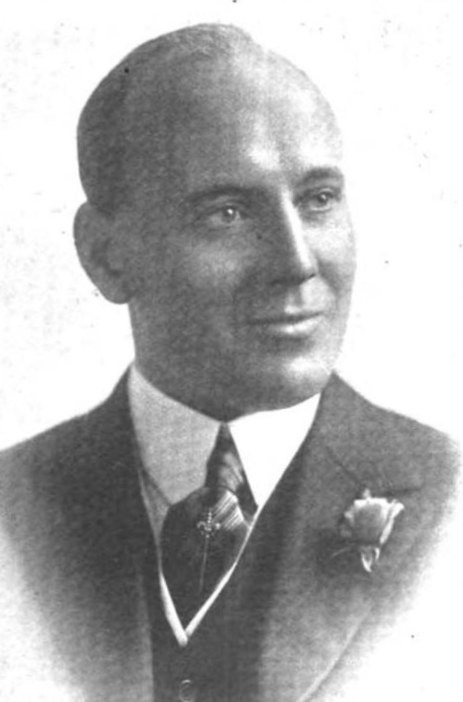

Member of the Legislative Assembly of British Columbia
- In office 1953–1966
- Constituency: Vancouver Centre

Personal details
- Born: November 8, 1884; Brechin, Scotland
- Died: October 11, 1969 (aged 84); Vancouver, British Columbia
- Political party: Social Credit
- Spouses: Elsie Rosaline Pentland (m. 1918) Norma Irene McCue (m. 1962)
- Occupation: Insurance manager, Notary Public, politician

Alexander Small Matthew (November 8, 1884 – October 11, 1969) was a Scottish-born insurance company manager and political figure in British Columbia. He represented Vancouver Centre from 1953 to 1966 as a Social Credit member. From 1954 to 1964, he served as deputy speaker of the Legislature.

== Biography ==
He was born in Brechin in 1884, the son of George Matthew and Nellie Calenhead. He was married twice: first to Elsie Rosaline Pentland on June 26, 1918 and then to Norma Irene McCue in 1962. Matthew was secretary for the Society of Notaries Public of British Columbia. He died in Vancouver at the age of 84 in 1969.
