= Roy Thomas Cummings =

Canadian politician (1930–1976)

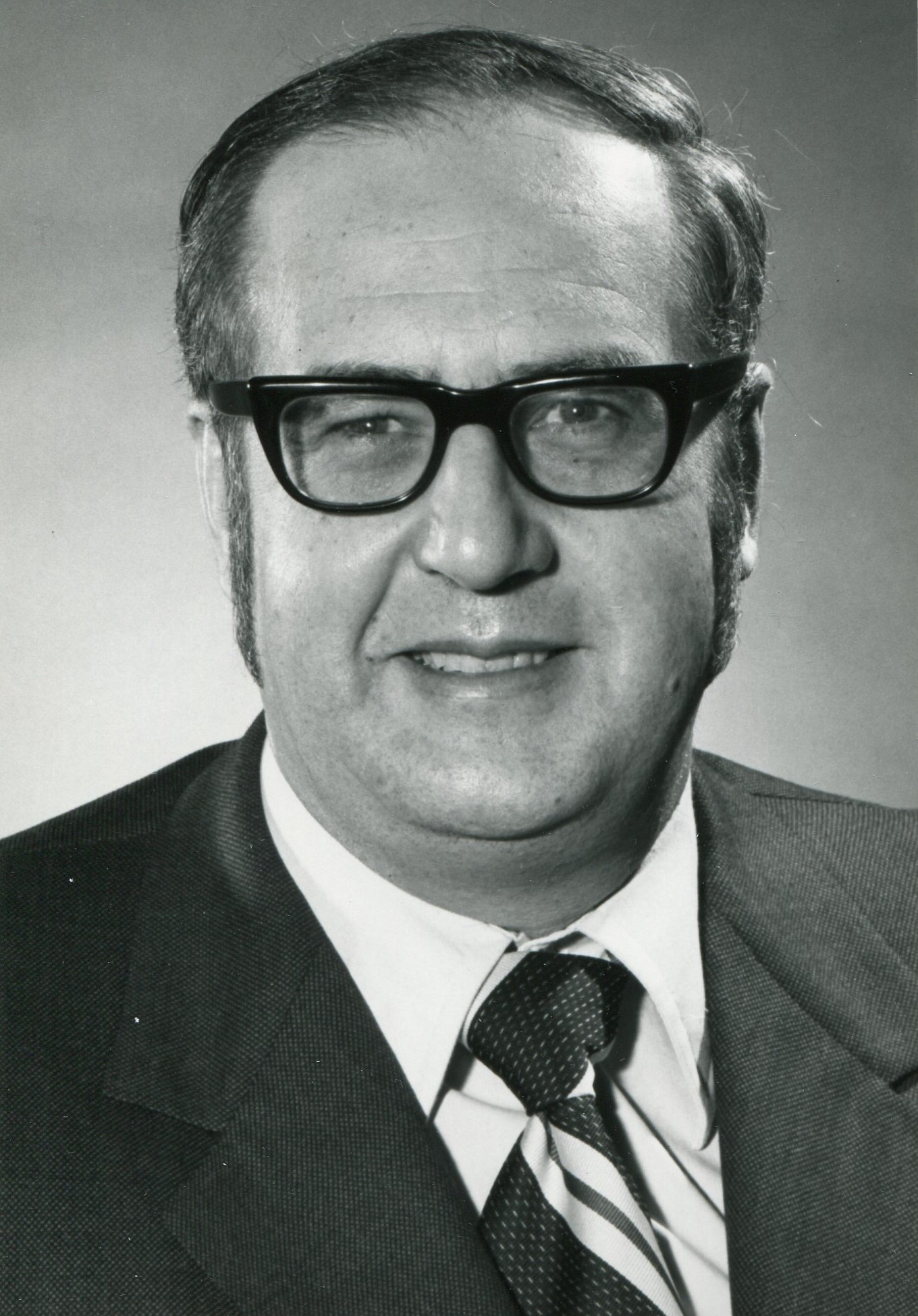

MLA for Vancouver-Little Mountain
- In office 1972–1975

Personal details
- Born: May 28, 1930 Vancouver, British Columbia
- Died: May 23, 1976 (aged 45) Chilliwack, British Columbia
- Party: British Columbia New Democratic Party
- Spouse: Muriel Spurgeon

Roy Thomas Cummings (May 28, 1930 – May 23, 1976) was a Canadian politician. He served in the Legislative Assembly of British Columbia from 1972 to 1975, as a NDP member for the constituency of Vancouver–Little Mountain. In the 1972 provincial election, his occupation was listed as "merchant" on the ballot. He was defeated in his bid for a second term in 1975. He died of a heart attack in 1976.
