= Earle Cathers Westwood =

Canadian politician

Earle Cathers Westwood (September 13, 1909 – August 14, 1980) was a funeral home operator and political figure in British Columbia. He represented Nanaimo and the Islands in the Legislative Assembly of British Columbia from 1956 to 1963 as a Social Credit member.

Westwood was born at East Wellington in the Nanaimo district, the son of Joseph Arthur Henry Westwood and Mary Smith. In 1937, he married Dorothy Verna Humphrey. Westwood owned the Westwood Funeral Home. He was elected an alderman on Nanaimo City Council in 1945–1949, then elected mayor in 1950-1952 and again in 1956. He also served as chairman of the local school board. Westwood ran unsuccessfully for a seat in the provincial assembly in 1953.

Dorothy Westwood died on April 11, 1956. Five months later Earle Westwood was elected Member of the Legislative Assembly (MLA) on September 19, 1956. Westwood married Sheila Blackwood Maxwell in 1957. He was a member of the provincial cabinet, holding the positions of Minister of Trade and Industry, Minister of Recreation and Conservation and Minister of Commercial Transport. He was defeated by David Stupich when he ran for reelection to the assembly in 1963.

After leaving politics, Westwood served as British Columbia's agent general in London. He retired from that post in October 1968. He died in Nanaimo at the age of 70 in 1980.

Sheila Westwood died age 100 in 2015.
