= Dale Lovick =

Canadian politician (born 1944)

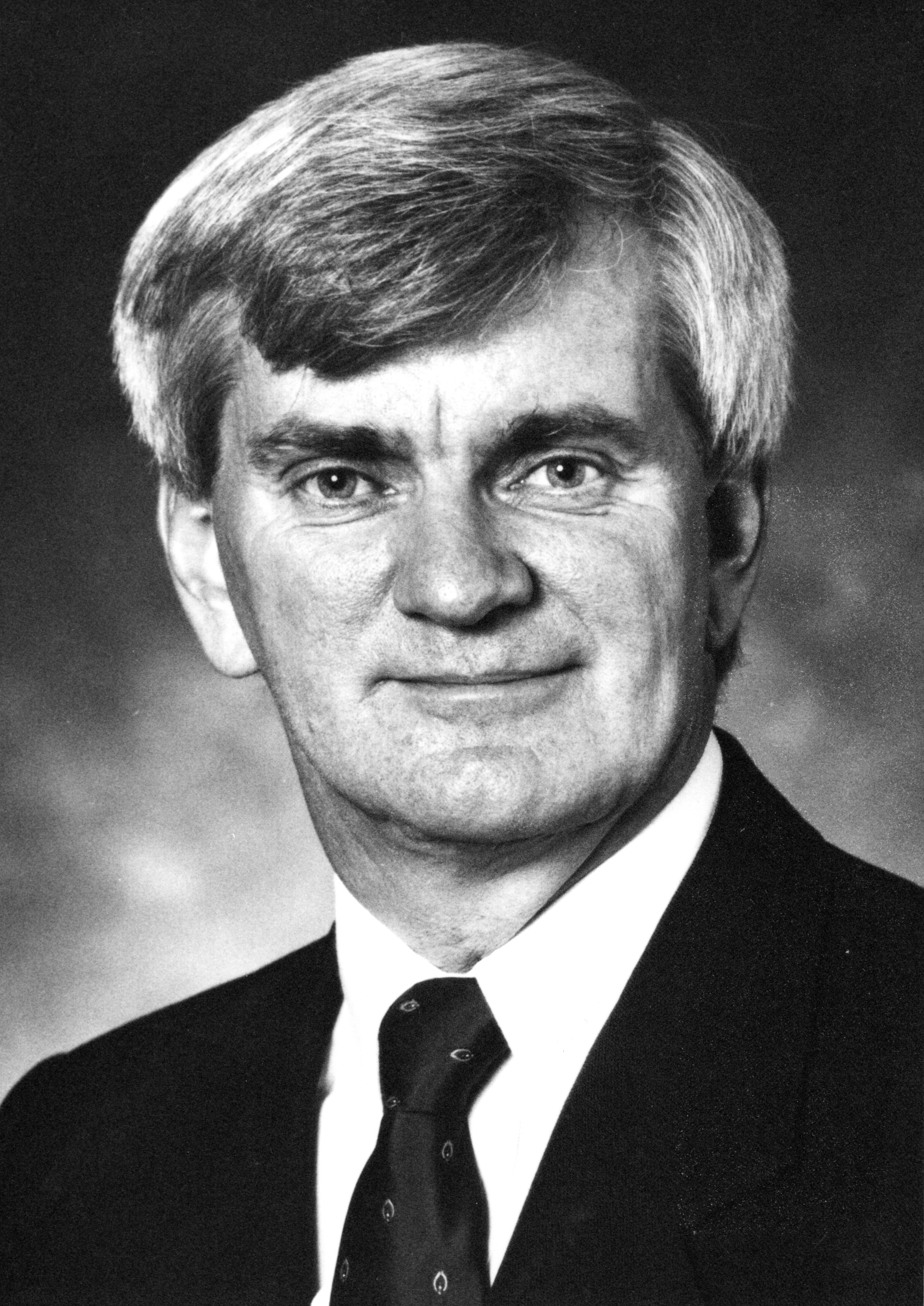

32nd Speaker of the Legislative Assembly of British Columbia
- In office June 25, 1996 – February 18, 1998
- Preceded by: Emery Barnes
- Succeeded by: Gretchen Brewin

Deputy Speaker of the Legislative Assembly of British Columbia
- In office March 22, 1994 – June 25, 1996
- Preceded by: Emery Barnes
- Succeeded by: Gretchen Brewin

Member of the British Columbia Legislative Assembly for Nanaimo
- In office October 22, 1986 – May 16, 2001 Serving with Dave Stupich (1986-1988); Jan Pullinger (1989-1991)
- Preceded by: Dave Stupich
- Succeeded by: Mike Hunter

Personal details
- Born: March 4, 1944 (age 82) Vancouver, British Columbia
- Party: New Democrat
- Spouse: Jan Pullinger

Laurence Dale Lovick (born March 4, 1944) is an educator and former political figure in British Columbia, Canada. He represented Nanaimo in the Legislative Assembly of British Columbia from 1986 to 2001 as a member of the NDP.

== Early life ==
Lovick was born in Vancouver, British Columbia, and received his education at the University of British Columbia and Carleton University. He was an instructor at Malaspina College in Nanaimo, where he also served as the head of the English department. At the time of his first election, Nanaimo was a dual-member district. Lovick served alongside Dave Stupich; who resigned in 1988 and was succeeded in a by-election by Jan Pullinger, whom Lovick would later marry. When the province's electoral districts were realigned into single member districts for the 1991 election, Lovick continued to represent Nanaimo, while Pullinger moved to the new neighbouring district of Cowichan-Ladysmith.

== Career ==
Lovick held various leadership roles within the Legislative Assembly, serving as the deputy speaker of the Legislative Assembly from 1994 to 1996, and then Speaker of the Legislative Assembly of British Columbia from 1996 to 1998. He served in the provincial cabinet as Minister of Labour from February 1998 to July 1999, as Minister of Aboriginal Affairs from February 1998 to January 1999 and again from July 1999 to November 2000, and as Minister Responsible for the Insurance Corporation of BC from January 1999 to February 2000. He was also government whip from 2000 to 2001.

Apart from his political career, Lovick was the editor of Tommy Douglas Speaks (ISBN 0889820228), published in 1979, and contributed to The Canadian Encyclopedia.

In 2004, he was named to the board of directors for the Nanaimo Area Land Trust.
