= Graham Bruce =

Canadian politician (born 1952)

Member of the British Columbia Legislative Assembly for Cowichan-Ladysmith
- In office May 16, 2001 – May 17, 2005
- Preceded by: Jan Pullinger
- Succeeded by: Doug Routley

Member of the British Columbia Legislative Assembly for Cowichan-Malahat
- In office October 22, 1986 – October 17, 1991
- Preceded by: Barbara Wallace
- Succeeded by: Jan Pullinger

Minister of Municipal Affairs, Recreation and Culture of British Columbia
- In office April 15, 1991 – November 5, 1991
- Premier: Rita Johnston
- Preceded by: Lyall Franklin Hanson
- Succeeded by: Robin Blencoe (Municipal Affairs, Recreation and Housing)

Minister of Skills Development and Labour of British Columbia
- In office June 5, 2001 – June 16, 2005
- Premier: Gordon Campbell
- Preceded by: Joan Smallwood (Labour)
- Succeeded by: Michael de Jong (Labour and Citizens' Services)

Mayor of North Cowichan
- In office 1979–1987
- Preceded by: George W. Whittaker
- Succeeded by: H. Rex Hollett

Personal details
- Born: July 7, 1952 (age 74) Duncan, British Columbia
- Party: Social Credit → BC Liberal
- Spouse: Anneke

Graham Preston Bruce is a Canadian former politician who served as a member of the Legislative Assembly of British Columbia, representing the electoral district of Cowichan-Malahat from 1986 to 1991 as part of the Social Credit Party (Socred), and the district of Cowichan-Ladysmith from 2001 to 2005 as a BC Liberal. He was a cabinet minister under premiers Rita Johnston and Gordon Campbell.

== Biography ==
Bruce was a North Cowichan councillor for three years, before serving as the municipality's mayor from 1979 to 1987. In the 1983 provincial election, he ran as a Social Credit Party candidate in the riding of Cowichan-Malahat, but lost to the incumbent New Democratic Party (NDP) candidate Barbara Wallace.

He ran in Cowichan-Malahat again in the 1986 provincial election, this time defeating NDP candidate Carolyn Askew to become the riding's member of the Legislative Assembly. On October 3, 1989, Bruce and three colleagues — Duane Delton Crandall, David Mercier, and Doug Mowat — quit the governing Social Credit caucus to sit as "Independent Social Credit" members. In a joint statement, the four stressed that they "in no way desire[d] the fall of our government", but wished to spur an "open and realistic assessment" of Premier Bill Vander Zalm's continued leadership. Bruce was said to have grown discontent after the shocking by-election defeat in Cariboo, a longtime stronghold for the party, two weeks prior. He returned to the Socred caucus on February 14, 1990, alongside Mercier and Mowat (Crandall had already rejoined caucus in January).

Vander Zalm resigned as premier and party leader in April 1991; his successor Rita Johnston appointed Bruce to the cabinet as Minister of Municipal Affairs, Recreation and Culture. With the Cowichan-Malahat riding being disestablished ahead of that October's provincial election, Bruce instead contested the new riding of Cowichan-Ladysmith. Despite the change in leadership, the Socreds were unable to make up lost ground, and was defeated by the NDP; Bruce himself lost to NDP candidate Jan Pullinger.

Bruce ran for party leader following Johnston's resignation in January 1992. In the November 1993 leadership election, he came in second place behind Grace McCarthy after three ballots.

He returned to politics in 2001 by running again in Cowichan-Ladysmith in that year's provincial election, this time for the BC Liberals. He defeated NDP candidate Rob Hutchins to re-enter the legislature, and was named to Premier Gordon Campbell's cabinet that June as Minister of Skills Development and Labour; he was additionally named Government House Leader in December 2004. He ran for re-election in 2005, but lost to NDP challenger Doug Routley.

Following his re-election loss, Bruce conducted consulting work for the Cowichan Tribes. In 2007, he was accused by the opposition NDP of improper lobbying activities on behalf of the tribes within two years of his departure from the legislature. Conflict of Interest Commissioner Paul Fraser ruled in 2009 that Bruce did not benefit directly from his previous ministerial role. However, in a separate investigation by the Commissioner of Lobbying of Canada, Bruce was found in breach of the Federal Lobbyists' Code of Conduct for not registering.

From 2009 to 2018, Bruce was chief executive officer of the Island Corridor Foundation, an organization seeking to revive passenger rail service on Vancouver Island.

He and his wife Anneke have four children together.
