= Nanaimo (provincial electoral district) =

Provincial electoral district in British Columbia, Canada

Coordinates: 49.16218°N 123.93771°W

British Columbia electoral district

Defunct provincial electoral district
- Legislature: Legislative Assembly of British Columbia
- First contested: 1941
- Last contested: 2020

Demographics
- Population (2011): 57,008
- Area (km²): 458
- Census division: Nanaimo Regional District
- Census subdivision(s): Nanaimo, Nanaimo C

Nanaimo is a former provincial electoral district for the Legislative Assembly of British Columbia, Canada, in use until 2024.

== Demographics ==
Population, 2011	57,008
Area (km^{2})	458
Pop. Density (people per km^{2})	124.5

== Geography ==
The riding contains most of the city of Nanaimo plus the uninhabited Five Finger Island, Snake Island and Hudson Rocks which are in the Nanaimo C electoral area.

== History ==
The district was known as Nanaimo and the Islands from 1941 to 1963. It was formed of parts of the former ridings of Alberni-Nanaimo and The Islands. In the 1966 election the Nanaimo riding name was restored and the southern part of the riding became Saanich and the Islands. That area is now part of Saanich North and the Islands. An older riding with the name Nanaimo existed from 1871 to 1928.

In 1966, the riding contained the eastern and southern portions of the Nanaimo Regional District, plus Valdes Island and Lasqueti Island.

For the 1979 election, the riding shifted southwards, running from Lantzville in the north to Ladysmith in the south. It also lost Valdes and Lasqueti Islands.

From 1986 to 1991, the riding returned two members. In 1991, the riding shrunk in size. The northern part of the riding, including the northern coast of the City of Nanaimo was transferred to Parksville-Qualicum, while the southern boundary was moved up to the southern limit of the Nanaimo Regional District, except for Valdes Island, which was added back to the riding.

In 2001, the riding's western boundaries were extended to include nearly all of the Nanaimo C Electoral Area.

In 2009, the riding was drastically reduced in size, consisting solely of part of the city of Nanaimo. In the 2017 redistribution, the riding gained part of the City of Nanaimo west of the Nanaimo Parkway.

Under the 2021 British Columbia electoral redistribution that took effect upon the calling of the 2024 election, the riding was eliminated by being divided north–south between Nanaimo-Lantzville and Nanaimo-Gabriola Island.

== Member of the Legislative Assembly ==
Assembly	Years	Member	Party
Nanaimo and the Islands
20th	1941–1945	George Sharratt Pearson	Liberal
21st	1945–1949	George Sharratt Pearson	Coalition
22nd	1949–1952	George Sharratt Pearson	Coalition
23rd	1952–1953	Larry Giovando	Progressive Conservative
24th	1953–1956	Larry Giovando	Progressive Conservative
25th	1956–1960	Earle Westwood	Social Credit
26th	1960–1963	Earle Westwood	Social Credit
27th	1963–1966	David Stupich	New Democratic
Nanaimo
28th	1966–1969	David Stupich	New Democratic
29th	1969–1972	Frank Ney	Social Credit
30th	1972–1975	David Stupich	New Democratic
31st	1975–1979	David Stupich	New Democratic
32nd	1979–1983	David Stupich	New Democratic
33rd	1983–1986	David Stupich	New Democratic
34th	1986–1988	Dale Lovick; David Stupich	New Democratic
34th	1989–1991	Dale Lovick; Jan Pullinger	New Democratic
35th	1991–1996	Dale Lovick	New Democratic
36th	1996–2001	Dale Lovick	New Democratic
37th	2001–2005	Mike Hunter	Liberal
38th	2005–2009	Leonard Krog	New Democratic
39th	2009–2013	Leonard Krog	New Democratic
40th	2013–2017	Leonard Krog	New Democratic
41st	2017–2018	Leonard Krog	New Democratic
41st	2019–2020	Sheila Malcolmson	New Democratic
42nd	2020–2024	Sheila Malcolmson	New Democratic

== Election results ==
2020 British Columbia general election
Party	Candidate	Votes	%	±%	Expenditures
New Democratic	Sheila Malcolmson	14,334	54.49	+4.57	$34,570.32
Green	Lia Marie Constance Versaevel	6,078	23.09	+15.74	$5,101.61
Liberal	Kathleen Jones	5,903	22.42	−17.51	$26,013.13
Total valid votes		26,325	100.00	–	
Total rejected ballots					
Turnout					
Registered voters					
Source: Elections BC

British Columbia provincial by-election, January 30, 2019
Party	Candidate	Votes	%	±%	Expenditures
New Democratic	Sheila Malcolmson	12,114	49.92	+3.38	$50,194
Liberal	Tony Harris	9,691	39.93	+7.39	$57,212
Green	Michele Ney	1,783	7.35	−12.56	$41,039
Conservative	Justin Greenwood	491	2.02	–	$1,432
Vancouver Island Party	Robin Mark Richardson	112	0.46	–	$4,208
Libertarian	Bill Walker	76	0.32	−0.69	$246
Total valid votes		24,267	100.00	–	
Total rejected ballots		33	0.14	−0.36	
Turnout		24,300	52.59	−8.68	
Registered voters		46,210			
New Democratic hold		Swing		−2.01	
Source: Elections BC

2017 British Columbia general election
Party	Candidate	Votes	%	±%	Expenditures
New Democratic	Leonard Krog	12,746	46.54	+0.83	$27,486
Liberal	Paris Gaudet	8,911	32.54	−4.66	$68,406
Green	Kathleen Harris	5,454	19.91	+9.31	$5,042
Libertarian	Bill Walker	277	1.01	–	$2,583
Total valid votes		27,388	100.00	–	
Total rejected ballots		137	0.50	+0.06	
Turnout		27,525	62.30	+4.14	
Registered voters		44,184			
New Democratic hold		Swing		+2.75	
Source: Elections BC

^ Change is based on redistributed results

2013 provincial general election redistributed results
Party	Vote	%
New Democratic	11,363	45.71
Liberal	9,247	37.19
Green	2,635	10.60
Conservative	1,344	5.41
Others	272	1.09

2013 British Columbia general election
Party	Candidate	Votes	%	±%	Expenditures
New Democratic	Leonard Krog	10,821	46.25	−7.08	$57,730
Liberal	Walter Douglas Anderson	8,568	36.62	+0.32	$37,016
Green	Ian Elliot Gartshore	2,532	10.82	+1.68	$5,020
Conservative	Bryce Nelson Crigger	1,221	5.22	–	$6,297
Independent	Brunie Brunie	253	1.09	–	$1,339
Total valid votes		23,395	100.00	–	
Total rejected ballots		103	0.44	−0.27	
Turnout		23,498	57.96	+0.84	
Registered voters		40,545			
New Democratic hold		Swing		−3.70	
Source: Elections BC

2009 British Columbia general election
Party	Candidate	Votes	%	±%
New Democratic	Leonard Krog	11,877	53.33	+7.9
Liberal	Jeet Manhas	8,086	36.31	-6.2
Green	Dirk Becker	2,036	9.14	-0.8
Refederation	Linden Robert Shaw	272	1.22	
Total valid votes		22,271	99.29	
Total rejected ballots		160	0.71	
Turnout		22,431	57.12	
Eligible voters		39,273		
New Democratic hold		Swing		+7.1

^ Change is based on redistributed results.

2005 provincial general election redistributed results
Party	%
New Democratic	45.4
Liberal	42.5
Green	9.9
Others	2.2

2005 British Columbia general election
Party	Candidate	Votes	%	±%
New Democratic	Leonard Krog	13,226	51.90	+21.67
Liberal	Mike Hunter	8,657	33.97	-10.67
Green	Doug Catley	2,933	11.51	-5.94
Marijuana	Mat Dillon	294	1.15	-2.92
Independent	Brunie Brunie	204	0.80	-0.11
Refederation	Linden Robert Shaw	169	0.66	–
Total valid votes		25,483	99.45	
Total rejected ballots		140	0.55	+0.05
Turnout		25,623	62.83	-7.04
Eligible voters		40,782		
New Democratic gain from Liberal		Swing		+16.17

2001 British Columbia general election
Party	Candidate	Votes	%	±%	Expenditures
Liberal	Mike Hunter	9,748	44.64	+11.28	$46,911
New Democratic	Leonard Krog	6,602	30.23	-18.51	$15,152
Green	Doug Catley	3,810	17.45	+15.33	$3,225
Marijuana	Donald Edgar Lavallée	889	4.07	–	$428
Unity	Steve Miller	588	2.69	–	$1,799
Independent	Brunie Brunie	199	0.91	–	$530
Total valid votes		21,836	99.50		
Total rejected ballots		110	0.50	-0.27	
Turnout		21,946	69.87	+0.08	
Registered voters		31,412			
Liberal gain from New Democratic		Swing		+14.90	

1996 British Columbia general election
Party	Candidate	Votes	%	±%	Expenditures
New Democratic	Dale Lovick	11,210	48.75		$16,425
Liberal	Gary Korpan	7,672	33.36		$52,556
Reform	Garry D. Shepp	1,867	8.12		$6,948
Progressive Democrat	David J. Weston	1,337	5.81	–	$703
Green	Karen M. Shillington	486	2.11	–	$250
Family Coalition	Vicki Podetz	311	1.35	–	$247
Libertarian	Mark Chase	113	0.49		$365
Total valid votes		22,996	99.23		
Total rejected ballots		179	0.77	-	
Turnout		23,175	69.79		
Eligible voters		33,207			

B.C. General Election 1991: Nanaimo
Party	Candidate	Votes	%	±	Expenditures
NDP	Dale Lovick	11,135	51.25%		$39,246
Liberal	Raymond A. Brookbank	7,556	34.77%		$1,051
Social Credit	Vivian M. Garner	2,480	11.41%	–	$17,601
Green	Karen M. Shillington	342	1.57%	–	$506
Family Coalition	David P. Bentley	145	0.67%	–	$226
Libertarian	Jack Boulogne	71	0.33%		
Total Valid Votes		21,729	100.00%		
Total Rejected Ballots		469	2.11%		
Turnout		22,198	74.54%		

Nanaimo By-Election 15 March 1989 (54% Voter turnout)
Party	Candidate	Votes	%	±	Expenditures
NDP	Jan Pullinger	14,613	57.12%		$36,999
Social Credit	Larry McNabb	9,062	35.42%	–	$42,216
Liberal	Raymond A. Brookbank	1,908	7.46%		$5,414
Total Valid Votes		25,583	100.00%		
Total Rejected Ballots		183	0.71%		
Turnout		25,766	54.29%		

34th British Columbia election, 1986 ^{1}
Party	Candidate	Votes	%	±	Expenditures
NDP	David Stupich	18,213	26.52%		
NDP	Dale Lovick	17,251	25.11%		
Social Credit	Doug McBride	15,868	23.10%	–	
Social Credit	James Alexander (Alex) Stuart	15,497	22.56%	–	
Liberal	Edwin V. Bourke	1,535	2.24%		
Communist	Deborah A. MacDonald	325	0.47%		
Total Valid Votes		68,689	100.00%		
Total Rejected Ballots		773	%		
Turnout			%		
^{1} two-member seat during this election

33rd British Columbia election, 1983
Party	Candidate	Votes	%	±	Expenditures
NDP	David Stupich	17,436	52.17%		
Social Credit	Graham J.R. Alce	13,490	40.36%	–	
Western Canada Concept	John Lloyd Cowan	1,090	3.26%		
Green	Alan Joseph Timberlake	625	1.87%	–	
Liberal	Shelagh J.F. (Sue) Matthews	554	1.66%		
Independent	Howard Peter Yearwood	228	0.68%		
Total Valid Votes		33,423	100.00%		
Total Rejected Ballots		269	%		
Turnout			%		

32nd British Columbia election, 1979
Party	Candidate	Votes	%	±	Expenditures
NDP	David Stupich	17,021	58.69%		
Social Credit	Thomas Wesley (Tom) Humble	11,979	41.31%	–	
Total Valid Votes		29,000	100.00%		
Total Rejected Ballots		420	%		
Turnout			%		

31st British Columbia election, 1975
Party	Candidate	Votes	%	±	Expenditures
NDP	David Stupich	12,177	49.08%		
Social Credit	Graeme C. Roberts	11,041	44.50%	–	
Progressive Conservative	Marjorie Ennis Moore	869	3.50%		
Liberal	William Harold Matthews	636	2.56%		
Communist	Raymond Holmgren	90	0.36%		
Total Valid Votes		24,813	100.00%		
Total Rejected Ballots		187	%		
Turnout			%		

30th British Columbia election, 1972
Party	Candidate	Votes	%	±	Expenditures
NDP	David Stupich	10,478	52.60%		
Social Credit	Frank Ney	6,409	32.17%	–	
Progressive Conservative	Graeme C. Roberts	1,880	9.44%		
Liberal	Lloyd Schoop	916	4.60%		
Independent	Nelson Edward Allen	238	1.19%		
Total Valid Votes		19,921	100.00%		
Total Rejected Ballots		327	%		
Turnout			%		

29th British Columbia election, 1969
Party	Candidate	Votes	%	±	Expenditures
Social Credit	Frank Ney	8,252	49.22%	–	
NDP	David Stupich	7,790	46.47%		
Liberal	Robert Steven Plecas	722	4.31%		
Total Valid Votes		16,764	100.00%		
Total Rejected Ballots		153	%		
Turnout			%		

28th British Columbia election, 1966
Party	Candidate	Votes	%	±	Expenditures
NDP	David Stupich	5,625	47.99%		
Social Credit	Frank Ney	5,580	47.61%	–	
Liberal	Robert Paul Goseltine	516	4.40%		
Total Valid Votes		11,721	100.00%		
Total Rejected Ballots		114	%		
Turnout			%		

=== Nanaimo and The Islands (1941-1966) ===
27th British Columbia election, 1963
Party	Candidate	Votes	%	±	Expenditures
NDP	David Stupich	4,278	42.44%		unknown
Liberal	Robert Clayton Weir	960	9.52%		unknown
Social Credit	Earle Cathers Westwood	4,259	42.26%	–	unknown
Progressive Conservative	Cornelia Petronella Adriana Wildman	582	5.77%		unknown
Total valid votes		10,079	100.00%		
Total rejected ballots		79			
Turnout		65.33%			

26th British Columbia election, 1960
Party	Candidate	Votes	%	±	Expenditures
Co-operative Commonwealth Fed.	Colin Cameron	4,548	41.87%		unknown
Liberal	Hugh Basil Heath	1,036	9.54%		unknown
Communist	Irving Floyd Mortensen	72	0.66%		unknown
Progressive Conservative	Edward Drewry Strongitharm	607	5.59%		unknown
Social Credit	Earle Cathers Westwood	4,599	42.34%	–	unknown
Total valid votes		10,862	100.00%		
Total rejected ballots		151			
Turnout		%			

25th British Columbia election, 1956
Party	Candidate	Votes	%	±	Expenditures
Independent	Edward Joseph Brewster	69	0.77%		unknown
Co-operative Commonwealth Fed.	Arthur Roderick Glen	2,963	32.92%		unknown
Liberal	Peter Maffeo	2,142	23.80%		unknown
Social Credit	Earle Cathers Westwood	3,827	45.52%	–	unknown
Total valid votes		9,001	100.00%		
Total rejected ballots		109			
Turnout		%			

24th British Columbia election, 1953 ^{2}
Party	Candidate	Votes 1st count	%	Votes final count	%	±%	
Liberal	Elmer Pearce Bradshaw	1,375	13.99%	-	%		unknown
Independent	Edward Joseph Brewster	32	0.33%	-	%		unknown
Progressive Conservative	Larry Giovando	2,046	20.82%	4,376	50.10%		unknown
Co-operative Commonwealth Fed.	David Stupich	3,631	36.96%	4,358	49.90%		unknown
Labor-Progressive	Grace Ellen Tickson	115	1.17%	-	-%		unknown
Social Credit	Earle Cathers Westwood	2,626	26.73%				
Total valid votes		9,825	100.00%	8,734	%		
Total rejected ballots		363					
Total Registered Voters							
Turnout		%					
Preferential ballot; final count is between top two candidates from first count; intermediary counts (of 5) not shown

23rd British Columbia election, 1952^{1}
Party	Candidate	Votes 1st count	%	Votes final count	%	±%	
Liberal	Elmer Pearce Bradshaw	2,263	21.59%	-	%		unknown
Social Credit League	Edward Joseph Brewster	951	9.07%				
Progressive Conservative	Larry Giovando	3,346	31.92%	5,144	52.89%		unknown
Labor-Progressive	Nigel Morgan	207	1.97%	-	-%		unknown
Co-operative Commonwealth Fed.	David Stupich	3,715	35.44%	4,581	47.11%		unknown
Total valid votes		10,482	100.00%	9,725	%		
Total rejected ballots		207					
Turnout		%					
^{1} Preferential ballot; final count is between top two candidates from first count; intermediary counts (of 4) not shown

22nd British Columbia election, 1949
Party	Candidate	Votes	%	±	Expenditures
Coalition	George Sharratt Pearson	5,860	61.50%	–	unknown
Co-operative Commonwealth Fed.	David Stupich	3,564	37.41%		unknown
Union of Electors	Herbert William Summers	104	1.09%	–	unknown
Total valid votes		9,528	100.00%		
Total rejected ballots		58			
Turnout		%			

21st British Columbia election, 1945
Party	Candidate	Votes	%	±	Expenditures
Social Credit Alliance	George Henry Broughton	89	1.55%	–	unknown
Coalition	George Sharratt Pearson	3,124	54.24%	–	unknown
Co-operative Commonwealth Fed.	Joseph White	2,547	44.22%		unknown
Total valid votes		5,760	100.00%		
Total rejected ballots		66			
Turnout		63.19%			

20th British Columbia election, 1941
Party	Candidate	Votes	%	±	Expenditures
Conservative	Victor Birch Harrison	1,208	24.17%		unknown
Co-operative Commonwealth Fed.	Thomas O'Connor	1,615	32.31%		unknown
Liberal	George Sharratt Pearson	2,175	43.52%		unknown
Total valid votes		4,998	100.00%		
Total rejected ballots		62			
Turnout		%			
