= David Stupich =

Canadian politician (1921–2006)

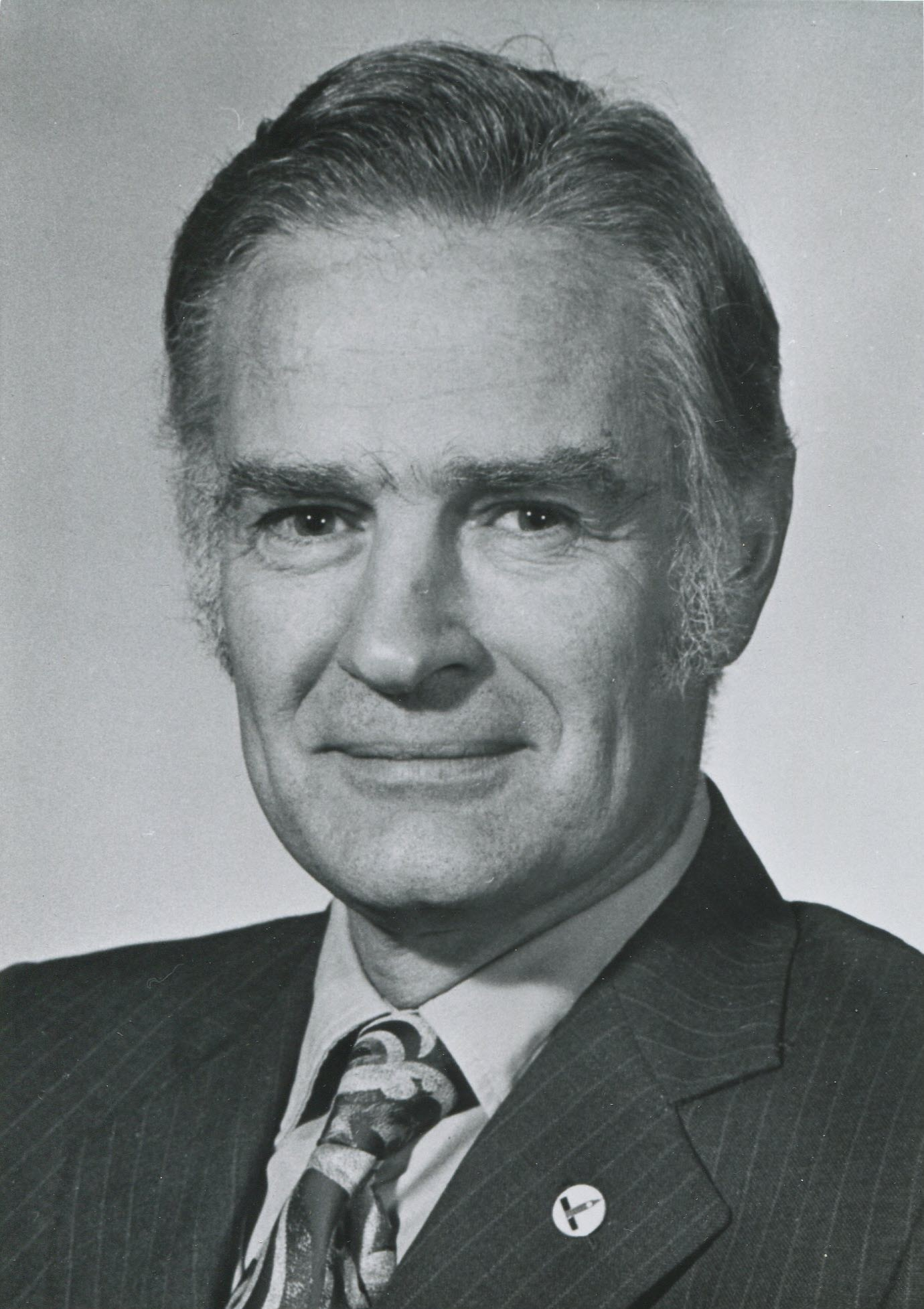

Member of Parliament for Nanaimo—Cowichan
- In office 21 November 1988 – 25 October 1993
- Preceded by: James Manly
- Succeeded by: Bob Ringma

Member of the Legislative Assembly of British Columbia for Nanaimo Nanaimo and the Islands (1963-1966)
- In office 30 August 1972 – 13 October 1988 Serving with Dale Lovick (1986-1988)
- Preceded by: Frank Ney
- Succeeded by: Jan Pullinger
- In office 30 September 1963 – 27 August 1969
- Preceded by: Earle Westwood
- Succeeded by: Frank Ney

Personal details
- Born: David Daniel Stupich; 5 December 1921 Nanaimo, British Columbia
- Died: 8 February 2006 (aged 84) Nanaimo, British Columbia
- Party: New Democratic Party
- Profession: Chartered Accountant

David Daniel Stupich (5 December 1921 – 8 February 2006) was a member of the Legislative Assembly of British Columbia from 1963 to 1969 and from 1972 to 1988, and a member of the House of Commons of Canada from 1988 to 1993. Stupich was born in Nanaimo, British Columbia to a coal miner.

He served five years in the Royal Canadian Air Force. After the war, he used his veteran's grant to get a degree in agriculture at the University of British Columbia. He then became a chicken farmer and studied at night to become a Chartered Accountant. He donated his spare time to doing books for local service clubs.

== Provincial politics ==
His first political campaign was an unsuccessful bid to become a member of the Legislative Assembly of British Columbia in 1949. He was the provincial CCF party candidate for the Nanaimo and the Islands riding. He was also an unsuccessful candidate in the 1952 and 1953 provincial elections.

He entered provincial politics by winning the Nanaimo and the Islands riding in the 1963 British Columbia election. He was re-elected in the 1966 provincial election when the riding name changed to simply Nanaimo, but lost the riding to Social Credit candidate Frank Ney in the 1969 election. In the 1972 provincial election, Stupich defeated Ney and returned to the Legislature, and remained a member until 1988. As Minister of Agriculture between 1972 and 1975, he introduced the Agricultural Land Reserve bill, which saved thousands of acres of farm land from the paver. He also served as British Columbia's Minister of Finance from October to December 1975.

== Federal politics ==
Stupich then entered federal politics and was elected in the 1988 federal election at the Nanaimo—Cowichan electoral district for the New Democratic Party. He served in the 34th Canadian Parliament but lost to Bob Ringma of the Reform Party in the 1993 federal election.

== Bingogate ==
Stupich was the central figure in a scandal known as Bingogate. In the late 1950s, Stupich set up and controlled the Nanaimo Commonwealth Holding Society (NCHS), which raised funds on behalf of the NDP.

But after a tip that something was amiss from the head of the Nanaimo Commonwealth Bingo Association, the RCMP launched an investigation. It found Stupich ran kickback schemes in which donations to charities were refunded to NCHS. In 1999, Stupich, then 77, faced 64 charges, including theft, fraud, forgery and breach of trust. He pleaded guilty that year to fraud and running an illegal lottery, involving the misappropriation of about $1 million from the NCHS. He was sentenced to two years, serving it on electronic monitoring at his daughter's home in Nanaimo.

Related charges against Stupich's partner Elizabeth Marlow and daughter Marjorie Boggis were stayed as part of a complex plea bargain.

Even though he was personally uninvolved, then-Premier Mike Harcourt resigned as a result of the scandal.

Stupich died in 2006 at Dufferin Place, a long-term care facility in Nanaimo.
