= Hullo (ferry) =

Passenger ferry service in Canada

Hullo Ferries

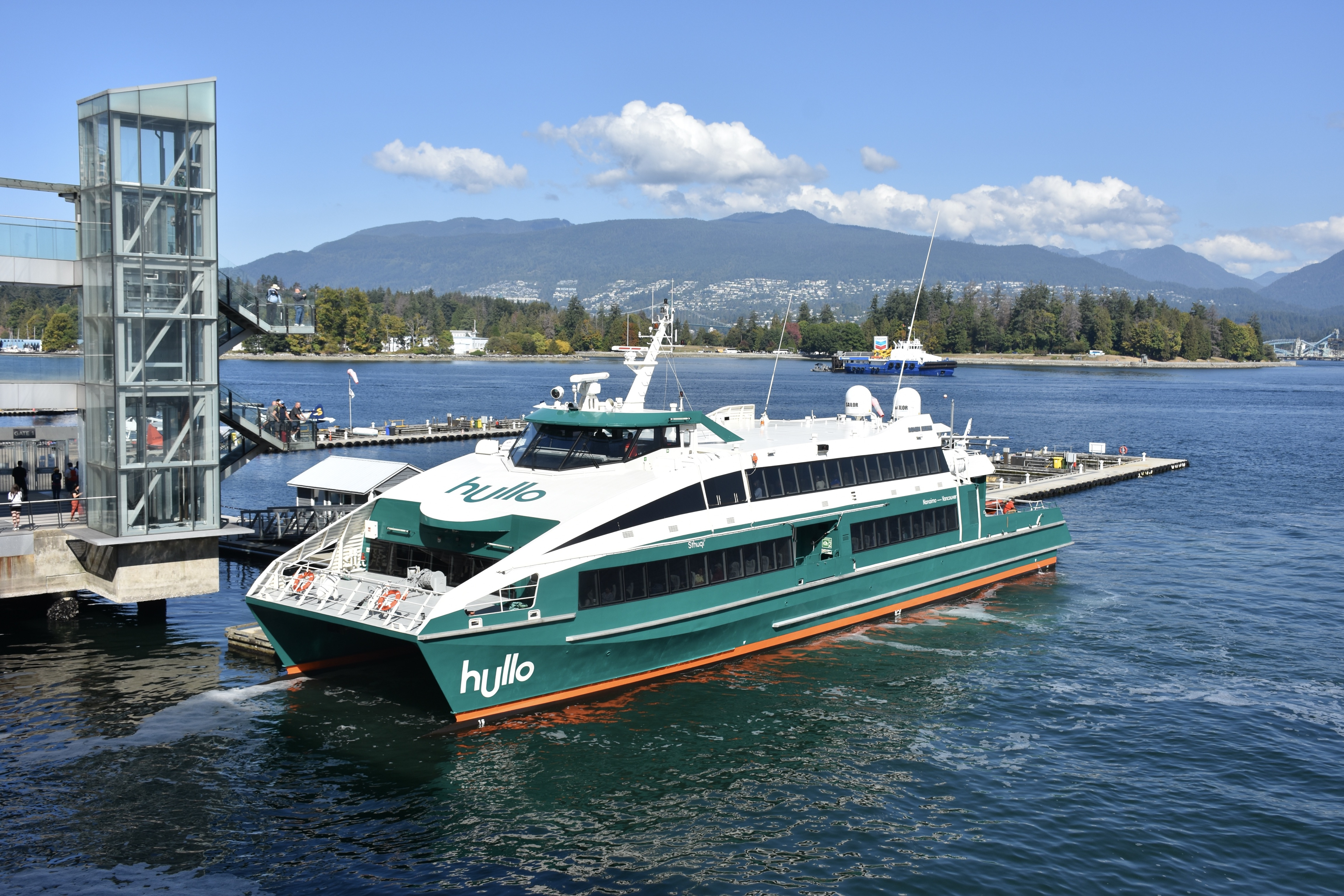
- Sthuqi’ at the Downtown Vancouver terminal
- Locale: British Columbia, Canada
- Waterway: Salish Sea
- Transit type: Passenger ferry
- Owner: Vancouver Island Ferry
- Operator: Hullo
- Began operation: August 16, 2023; 3 years ago
- No. of lines: 1
- No. of vessels: 2
- No. of terminals: Vancouver; Nanaimo
- Website: hullo.com

Hullo, officially the Vancouver Island Ferry Company, is a privately owned passenger ferry service in the Canadian province of British Columbia. It operates up to 14 daily sailings between downtown Vancouver and downtown Nanaimo on Vancouver Island. Each one-way trip takes around 75 minutes and is served by a catamaran that carries up to 354 seated passengers.

== History ==
The Vancouver Island Ferry Company was founded in 2022 with funding from Conqora Capital Partners and InfraRed Capital Partners. It is the fifth venture to attempt such a ferry service, following the previous service, HarbourLynx, which ceased operations in February 2006.

The service was scheduled to begin with a soft launch on August 14, 2023, but was delayed due to power outages in Nanaimo and high winds. Sailings were also cancelled for the following day. The inaugural departure on August 16 was limited to 189 passengers. Only two daily round trips were scheduled for the first weeks of service. By May 2024, Hullo announced it had served 250,000 passengers within its first nine months of service. The company also added late-night sailings for sporting events and concerts in Vancouver.

On its one-year anniversary in August 2024, Hullo announced it had served 400,000 passengers in its first year, or approximately 1,100 people daily. As of August 2025, sailings had increased to 3-6 roundtrips per day, and Hullo had plans to introduce a new route between Vancouver and Victoria.

== Vessels ==
The company's two vessels are high-speed catamarans that can carry up to 354 passengers each. They are named spuhéls and sthuqi’, meaning wind and Sockeye salmon in the Hul̓q̓umín̓um̓ language used by the Snuneymuxw First Nation on Vancouver Island. The ferries were manufactured by the Damen Group in Vietnam and delivered in June 2023. The Fast Ferry 4212 model is 42.2 metres (138 ft) long and has a top speed of 40 knots (74 km/h; 46 mph). The vessels do not accommodate electric bicycles due to battery fire regulations, but do allow electric wheelchairs after Hullo secured an exemption.
