= Nanaimo City Council =

Nanaimo City Council is the governing body for the city of Nanaimo, British Columbia, Canada. The council consists of the mayor and eight councillors.

The councillors are councillors-at-large elected for the entire city.

Municipal elections are held every four years across the Province on the third Saturday of November.

The first woman to be mayor in Nanaimo was Joy Leach (1990–1993), who defeated long-time mayor Frank Ney.

== Nanaimo City Council members ==
Current (2022)

The current city council was elected in 2022.

- Leonard Krog, Mayor
- Paul Manly, Councillor
- Sheryl Armstrong, Councillor
- Tyler Brown, Councillor
- Ben Geselbracht, Councillor
- Erin Hemmens, Councillor
- Ian Thorpe, Councillor
- Janice Perrino, Councillor
- Hilary Eastmure, Councillor
