= Frank Ney =

Canadian politician

20th Mayor of Nanaimo
- In office 1986–1990
- Preceded by: Graeme Roberts
- Succeeded by: Joy Leach
- In office 1968–1984
- Preceded by: Peter Maffeo
- Succeeded by: Graeme Roberts

Member of the Legislative Assembly for Nanaimo
- In office January 22, 1970 – July 24, 1972
- Preceded by: David Stupich
- Succeeded by: David Stupich

Personal details
- Born: May 12, 1918 London, England
- Died: November 24, 1992 (aged 74) Nanaimo, Canada
- Party: Social Credit

Military service
- Branch/service: Royal Air Force; Royal Canadian Air Force
- Battles/wars: World War II

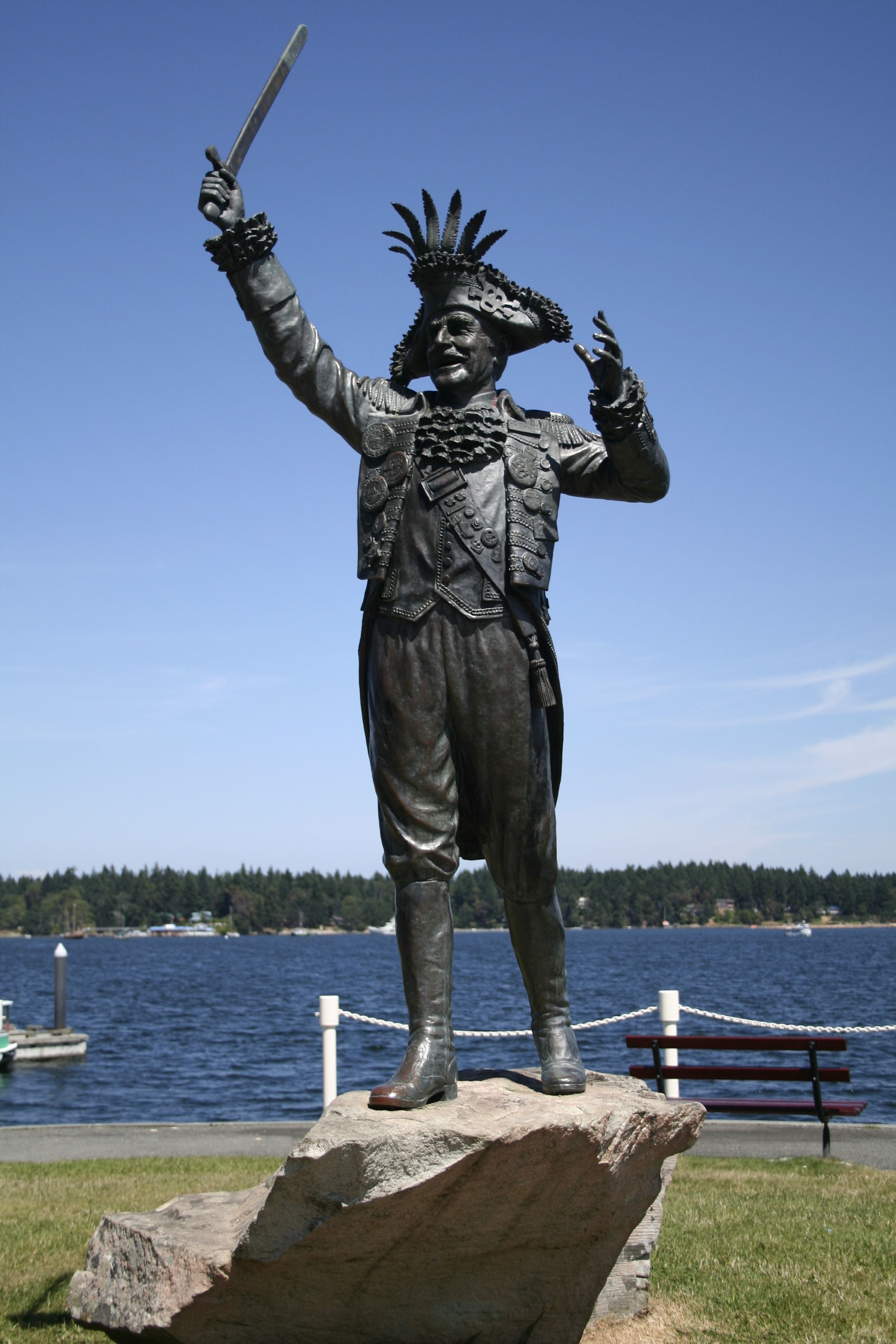
Statue of Frank Ney in Nanaimo.

Frank James Ney (May 12, 1918 – November 24, 1992) was a mayor of Nanaimo, British Columbia, Canada, serving for twenty-one years. Ney also served a term as a member of the Legislative Assembly of British Columbia. He was known for his outgoing personality, his habit of attending civic events and dressing up like a pirate for the appearances, and playing a central role in initiating the bathtub races across Georgia Strait from Nanaimo to Vancouver. He was an active skier, swimmer, figure skater and boater. During the 1950/1951 season he was President of the Nanaimo Figure Skating Club.

He also, while Mayor, initiated the creation of cut-away corners of sidewalk curbs in downtown Nanaimo after spending one day in a wheelchair in order to experience for himself the difficulties in getting around experienced by those in wheelchairs.

In his honour, Frank J. Ney Elementary School was named after him.

== Biography ==
Born in London, England, Ney served in the RAF and RCAF as a pilot during World War II. He was a resident of Nanaimo from 1946 until his death in 1992. He was Mayor of Nanaimo from 1968 to 1984, and 1987 to 1990 (defeated by Joy Leach), and a Social Credit Member of the Legislative Assembly for Nanaimo from 1969 to 1972. He was defeated in both the 1966 and 1972 provincial elections.

Ney was also a member of the Society of Notaries Public of British Columbia from January 1956, until his death in November 1992, and had a very busy notarial practice in Nanaimo. He was president of the Society from 1968-1969.

Ney, with his brother Bill, formed the Great National Land and Investment Corporation in 1964, was involved in real estate (as president of Nanaimo Realty Ltd.), and promoted the economic development of Vancouver Island. He is perhaps most famous for the purchase and subdivision of Protection Island in 1960 and selling it under a pirate-promotion theme.

He participated in many local and provincial associations, and was Chairman of the Nanaimo Centennial Committee (1967), responsible for organizing the inaugural Great Bathtub Race between Nanaimo and Vancouver. He was the first Chairman and Admiral of the Loyal Nanaimo Bathtub Society, established in 1968 to continue the bathtub race as an annual event. Ney was made Freeman of the City of Nanaimo in 1984.

A bronze statue of Ney, sculpted by Jack Harman, is sited at Swy-a-Lana Lagoon in downtown Nanaimo.

An extensive archive relating to Ney's personal and professional life are held in the Frank. J. Ney fonds at the Nanaimo Community Archives.

A biography about Frank Ney, based mainly on collected remembrance and stories about Ney, was published by Paul Gogo in 1995 (Frank Ney: A Canadian Legend).

A satirical musical review built around Ney's "Pirate Frank" persona premiered at Nanaimo's Western Edge Theatre in March 2007.

A play about him, Being Frank by writer/professor G. Kim Blank, was performed at the Port Theatre in Nanaimo in April 2007, produced by TheatreOne and directed by Burton Lancaster; there is also a book by Blank based on the play entitled Being Frank, from which the following portrayal of Ney's character is given in the Preface:

" . . . you watch Frank, but you don’t necessarily understand Frank, or even keep up with him. . . . what is immediately apparent is how many people will go on record to say they were "good friends" of Frank, though no one on the planet could have that many 'good friends.' But the effect he had on people, the way he moved around, his outward nature, his ability to be everywhere and always visible, the twinkle in his eye and the blarney of his gesture—all of this must have made him feel like everyone’s friend. Yet, despite this—and here is where his wonderfully maddening complexity sets in—those closest to him inevitably said something much more intriguing: they didn’t really know him; they didn’t really know what moved him forward and what made him tick, what got him going in the morning and kept him up at night."

Frank Ney also appears as a character in Season One Episode 18 of the television series Bones, by name and his Pirate Mayor personality.

== Election results ==
1972 British Columbia general election: Nanaimo
Party	Candidate	Votes	%	±%
New Democratic	David Stupich	10,478	52.60	+6.13
Social Credit	Frank Ney	6,409	32.17	–17.05
Progressive Conservative	Graeme C. Roberts	1,880	9.44	–
Liberal	Lloyd Schoop	916	4.60	+0.29
Independent	Nelson Edward Allen	238	1.19	–
Total valid votes		19,921	100.00	–
Total rejected ballots		327	–	–
Turnout		20,248	–	–
New Democratic gain from Social Credit		Swing		+20.43

1969 British Columbia general election: Nanaimo
Party	Candidate	Votes	%	±%
Social Credit	Frank Ney	8,252	49.22	+1.61
New Democratic	David Stupich	7,790	46.47	–1.52
Liberal	Robert Steven Plecas	722	4.31	–0.09
Total valid votes		16,764	100.00	–
Total rejected ballots		153	–	–
Turnout		16,917	–	–
Social Credit gain from New Democratic		Swing		+2.75

1966 British Columbia general election: Nanaimo
Party	Candidate	Votes	%	±%
New Democratic	David Stupich	5,625	47.99%	+5.55
Social Credit	Frank Ney	5,580	47.61	+5.35
Liberal	Robert Paul Goseltine	516	4.40	–5.12
Total valid votes		11,721	100.00	–
Total rejected ballots		114	–	–
Turnout		11,835	–	–
New Democratic hold		Swing		+0.38
