= Nanaimo-North Cowichan =

Provincial electoral district in British Columbia, Canada

British Columbia electoral district
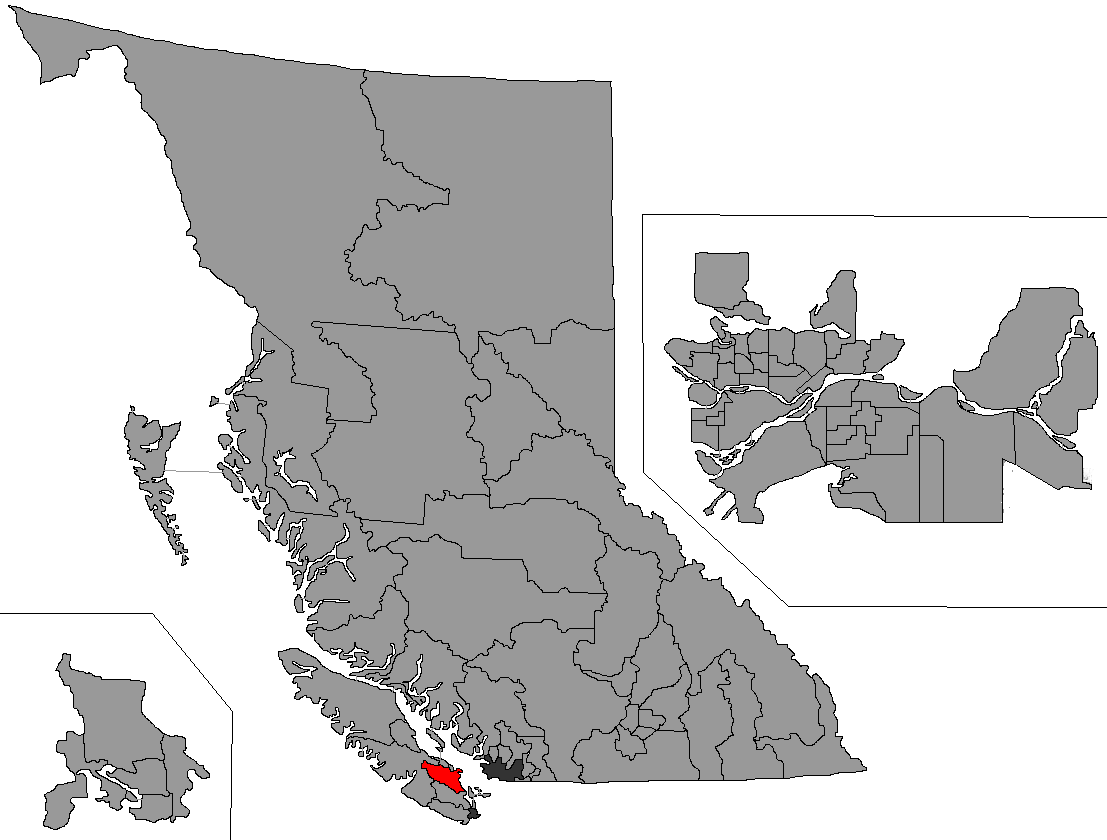

Defunct provincial electoral district
- Legislature: Legislative Assembly of British Columbia
- District created: 2008
- First contested: 2009
- Last contested: 2020

Demographics
- Population (2006): 49,402
- Area (km²): 2,720.43
- Census division(s): Regional District of Nanaimo, Cowichan Valley Regional District
- Census subdivision(s): Nanaimo, North Cowichan, Ladysmith

Nanaimo-North Cowichan is a former provincial electoral district in British Columbia, Canada, in use from 2009 to 2024.

It was established by the Electoral Districts Act, 2008 and first contested in the 2009 election. Under the 2021 redistribution that took effect from the 2024 election, a substantial reorganization of electoral boundaries in the Nanaimo and mid-Island area saw Nanaimo-North Cowichan dissolved, with its territory split between the districts of Cowichan Valley, Ladysmith-Oceanside and Nanaimo-Gabriola Island.

== MLAs ==
Assembly	Years	Member	Party
Nanaimo-North Cowichan
39th	2009–2013	Doug Routley	New Democratic
40th	2013–2017	Doug Routley	New Democratic
41st	2017–2020	Doug Routley	New Democratic
42nd	2020–2024	Doug Routley	New Democratic

== Electoral history ==
2020 British Columbia general election
Party	Candidate	Votes	%	±%	Expenditures
New Democratic	Doug Routley	12,787	49.48	+2.59	$20,730.17
Green	Chris Istace	7,700	29.80	+5.92	$16,549.41
Liberal	Duck Paterson	5,354	20.72	−3.16	$25,059.60
Total valid votes		25,841	100.00	–	
Total rejected ballots					
Turnout					
Registered voters					
Source: Elections BC

2017 British Columbia general election
Party	Candidate	Votes	%	±%	Expenditures
New Democratic	Doug Routley	12,276	46.89	+0.68	$34,949
Liberal	Alana DeLong	7,379	28.18	−2.59	$36,526
Green	Lia Marie Constance Versaevel	6,252	23.88	+10.15	$7,981
Independent	P. Anna Paddon	274	1.05	+0.77	$1,010
Total valid votes		26,181	100.00	–	
Total rejected ballots		198	0.75	+0.36	
Turnout		26,379	63.73	+2.62	
Registered voters		41,393			
Source: Elections BC

2013 British Columbia general election
Party	Candidate	Votes	%	±%	Expenditures
New Democratic	Doug Routley	11,542	46.21	−8.13	$55,479
Liberal	Amanda Lee Jacobson	7,685	30.77	−4.75	$32,579
Green	Mayo McDonough	3,430	13.73	+4.73	$5,363
Conservative	John James Donald Sherry	1,603	6.42	–	$12,676
Independent	Murray McNab	647	2.59	–	$1,575
Independent	P. Anna Paddon	71	0.28	–	$1,916
Total valid votes		24,978	100.00	–	
Total rejected ballots		98	0.39	−0.21	
Turnout		25,076	61.11	−0.34	
Registered voters		41,036			
Source: Elections BC

2009 British Columbia general election
Party	Candidate	Votes	%	Expenditures
New Democratic	Doug Routley	12,888	54.34	$74,487
Liberal	Rob Hutchins	8,426	35.52	$146,407
Green	Ian Gartshore	2,135	9.00	$3,497
Refederation	Ron James Fuson	271	1.14	$770
Total valid votes		23,720	100.00	
Total rejected ballots		142	0.60	
Turnout		23,862	61.45	
Registered voters		38,832		
Source: Elections BC
