= Cowichan-Ladysmith =

Defunct provincial electoral district in British Columbia, Canada

Cowichan-Ladysmith was a provincial electoral district for the Legislative Assembly of British Columbia, Canada. It made its first appearance on the hustings in the general election of 1991, and was eliminated when the legislature dissolved in advance of the 2009 election. Its predecessor riding was Cowichan-Malahat and was succeeded by Nanaimo-North Cowichan and Cowichan Valley.

== MLAs ==
Assembly	Years	Member	Party
Cowichan-Ladysmith
35th	1991–1996	Jan Pullinger	New Democratic
36th	1996–2001	Jan Pullinger	New Democratic
37th	2001–2005	Graham Bruce	Liberal
38th	2005–2009	Doug Routley	New Democratic

== Demographics ==
Population, 2001	51,125
Population change, 1996–2001	1.0%
Area (km^{2})	1,645.47
Pop. Density (people per km^{2})	31

== Election results ==
2005 British Columbia general election
Party	Candidate	Votes	%
New Democratic	Doug Routley	13,402	50.20%
Liberal	Graham Bruce	10,879	40.75%
Green	Cindy-Lee Robinson	1,823	6.83%
Independent	Jim Bell	290	1.09%
Democratic Reform	Brian Fraser Johnson	223	0.84%
Freedom	Jeremy Harold Sandwith Smyth	79	0.30%
Total		26,696	100.00%

B.C. General Election 2001: Cowichan-Ladysmith
Party	Candidate	Votes	%	±	Expenditures
Liberal	Graham Bruce	12,707	52.21%		$44,578
NDP	Rob Hutchins	7,783	31.98%		$26,172
Green	Loren Duncan	3,250	13.35%	–	$7,990
Marijuana	Larry Kunz	597	2.46%		$1,229
Total valid votes		24,337	100.00%		
Total rejected ballots		99	0.41%		
Turnout		24,436	76.71%		

B.C. General Election 1996: Cowichan-Ladysmith
Party	Candidate	Votes	%	±	Expenditures
NDP	Jan Pullinger	12,249	49.85%		$32,625
Liberal	Ray Smith	7,783	31.68%		$14,683
Reform	Tom Walker	2,434	9.91%		$14,763
Progressive Democrat	Perry James Johnston	1,459	5.94%	–	$1,983
Green	Julian West	645	2.63%	–	$3,167
Total valid votes		24,570	100.00%		
Total rejected ballots		117	0.47%		
Turnout		24,687	73.97%		

B.C. General Election 1991: Cowichan-Ladysmith
Party	Candidate	Votes	%	±	Expenditures
NDP	Jan Pullinger	11,038	48.53%		$42,602
Social Credit	Graham Bruce	6,809	29.94%	–	$65,164
Liberal	Anthony M. Hennig	4,896	21.53%		$4,797
Total valid votes		22,743	100.00%		
Total rejected ballots		374	1.62%		
Turnout		23,117	78.60%		
