= Doug Routley =

Canadian politician

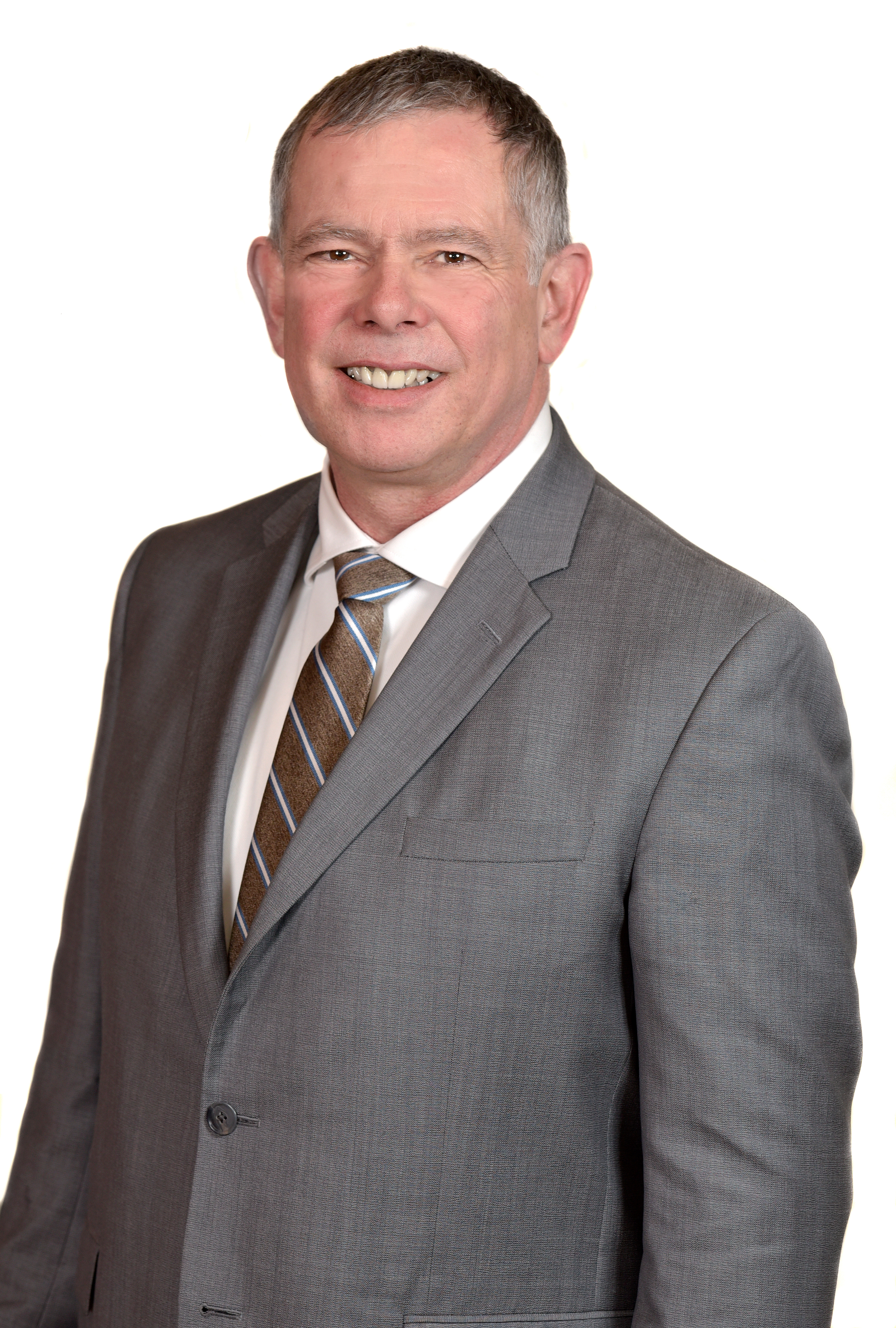

Parliamentary Secretary for Forests of British Columbia
- In office December 7, 2022 – November 18, 2024
- Premier: David Eby
- Preceded by: Position established
- Succeeded by: Position abolished

Member of the British Columbia Legislative Assembly for Nanaimo-North Cowichan Cowichan-Ladysmith (2005-2009)
- In office May 17, 2005 – September 21, 2024
- Preceded by: Graham Bruce
- Succeeded by: Riding dissolved

Personal details
- Born: May 9, 1961 (age 65) New Westminster, British Columbia
- Party: New Democrat
- Spouse: Leanne Finlayson
- Children: Sasha, Madeline

Doug Routley (born May 9, 1961) is a former MLA for Nanaimo-North Cowichan in the Canadian province of British Columbia. He was first elected to the Legislative Assembly in the riding of Cowichan-Ladysmith in the 2005 general election and then to the riding of Nanaimo-North Cowichan after new electoral districts were established for the 2009 general election.

He is a member of the British Columbia New Democratic Party.

In 2018, during legislative debate on new policies around sexual orientation and gender identity in the provincial education system, Routley came out as bisexual.

On December 7, 2022, he was appointed Parliamentary Secretary for Forests.

On September 26, 2023, he announced he would not be seeking a sixth term in the Legislature in the 2024 provincial election.

== Electoral results ==
2020 British Columbia general election: Nanaimo-North Cowichan
| Party | Candidate | Votes | % | ±% | Expenditures |
|---|---|---|---|---|---|
| New Democratic | Doug Routley | 12,787 | 49.48 | +2.59 | $20,730.17 |
| Green | Chris Istace | 7,700 | 29.80 | +5.92 | $16,549.41 |
| Liberal | Duck Paterson | 5,354 | 20.72 | −3.16 | $25,059.60 |
| Total valid votes | | 25,841 | 100.00 | – | |
| Total rejected ballots | | | | | |
| Turnout | | | | | |
| Registered voters | | | | | |
Source: Elections BC

2017 British Columbia general election: Nanaimo-North Cowichan
| Party | Candidate | Votes | % | ±% | Expenditures |
|---|---|---|---|---|---|
| New Democratic | Doug Routley | 12,276 | 46.89 | +0.68 | $34,949 |
| Liberal | Alana DeLong | 7,379 | 28.18 | −2.59 | $36,526 |
| Green | Lia Marie Constance Versaevel | 6,252 | 23.88 | +10.15 | $7,981 |
| Independent | P. Anna Paddon | 274 | 1.05 | +0.77 | $1,010 |
| Total valid votes | | 26,181 | 100.00 | – | |
| Total rejected ballots | | 198 | 0.75 | +0.36 | |
| Turnout | | 26,379 | 63.73 | +2.62 | |
| Registered voters | | 41,393 | | | |
Source: Elections BC

2013 British Columbia general election: Nanaimo-North Cowichan
| Party | Candidate | Votes | % | ±% | Expenditures |
|---|---|---|---|---|---|
| New Democratic | Doug Routley | 11,542 | 46.21 | −8.13 | $55,479 |
| Liberal | Amanda Lee Jacobson | 7,685 | 30.77 | −4.75 | $32,579 |
| Green | Mayo McDonough | 3,430 | 13.73 | +4.73 | $5,363 |
| Conservative | John James Donald Sherry | 1,603 | 6.42 | – | $12,676 |
| Independent | Murray McNab | 647 | 2.59 | – | $1,575 |
| Independent | P. Anna Paddon | 71 | 0.28 | – | $1,916 |
| Total valid votes | | 24,978 | 100.00 | – | |
| Total rejected ballots | | 98 | 0.39 | −0.21 | |
| Turnout | | 25,076 | 61.11 | −0.34 | |
| Registered voters | | 41,036 | | | |
Source: Elections BC

2009 British Columbia general election: Nanaimo-North Cowichan
| Party | Candidate | Votes | % | Expenditures |
|---|---|---|---|---|
| New Democratic | Doug Routley | 12,888 | 54.34 | $74,487 |
| Liberal | Rob Hutchins | 8,426 | 35.52 | $146,407 |
| Green | Ian Gartshore | 2,135 | 9.00 | $3,497 |
| Refederation | Ron James Fuson | 271 | 1.14 | $770 |
| Total valid votes | | 23,720 | 100.00 | |
| Total rejected ballots | | 142 | 0.60 | |
| Turnout | | 23,862 | 61.45 | |
| Registered voters | | 38,832 | | |
Source: Elections BC

2005 British Columbia general election: Cowichan-Ladysmith
| Party | Candidate | Votes | % |
|---|---|---|---|
| New Democratic | Doug Routley | 13,402 | 50.20% |
| Liberal | Graham Bruce | 10,879 | 40.75% |
| Green | Cindy-Lee Robinson | 1,823 | 6.83% |
| Independent | Jim Bell | 290 | 1.09% |
| Democratic Reform | Brian Fraser Johnson | 223 | 0.84% |
| Freedom | Jeremy Harold Sandwith Smyth | 79 | 0.30% |
| Total | | 26,696 | 100.00% |
