= HarbourLynx =

Canadian ferry company

Coordinates: 49.28714°N 123.10955°W

HarbourLynx was a private company based in Nanaimo, British Columbia that provided passenger-only high speed ferry service between the city centres of Nanaimo and Vancouver.

== Predecessors ==
HarbourLynx was the fourth venture to attempt such a ferry service. The first service in 1969, which used a passenger-only hovercraft, failed financially. The second service was similarly a hovercraft in the mid-1980s. The third venture Kvaerner Fjellstrand Shipping (owned by Fjellstrand A.S.), operating as Royal Sealink Express, ran for only 11 months during 1992–1993, using the 296-passenger MV Orca Spirit – the same model of ship used by HarbourLynx.

== Ship refurbishment ==
The HarbourLynx 40-metre (130 ft) catamaran (previously called the Philippine Kvaerner Fjellstrand Singapore Flying Cat) was built by Fjellstrand A.S. in 1996. After being laid up in the Philippines for two years, the catamaran was shipped to a Victoria shipyard for refurbishment and upgraded to meet Transport Canada regulations while the engines were refurbished by Detroit Diesel in Kamloops.

== Operation ==
After several cancelled sailings due to mechanical issues, the Harbourlynx vessel was pulled from service in February 2006 owing to major engine problems. The company filed for bankruptcy and changed ownership. Plans to revive the service never came to fruition.

== Sale of vessel ==
The vessel left Nanaimo's harbour on January 1, 2008 bound for Ireland, to serve the passage between Galway and the Aran Islands. She was purchased by Fjellstrand, a Norwegian ship building company, to retrofit the vessel and make her seaworthy again.
