= Bathtub racing =

Water sport

Bathtub racing is a competition that involves the use of bathtub boats, small powered watercraft designed around bathtubs or close facsimiles.

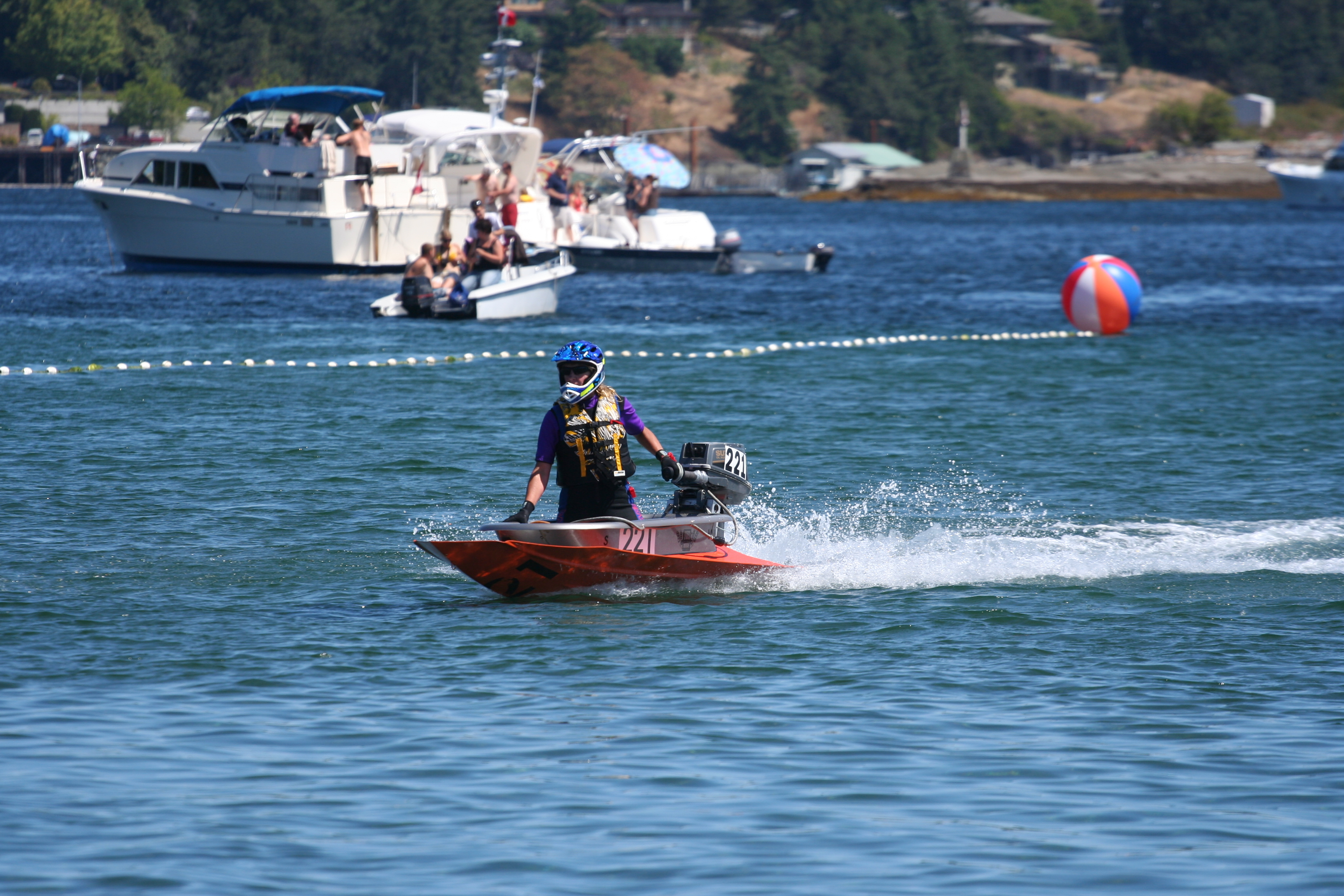
Bathtub racing in Nanaimo

== Boat design ==
Early boats were whimsical and crafted from a variety of materials. Today, most racing bathtub boats are monohull planer types with outboard motors. A form resembling a roll-top tub must be an integral part of the structure. Most tubbers make their "tub" by using a bathtub as the model to lay down a fiberglass mold.

The rules restrict the engine to 9.9 hp (7.3 kW), and the weight to a minimum of 350 lb (159 kg) including driver. There are three classes of bathtub boats: Stock, Modified, and Super-Modified. Stock motors must be an unmodified stock engine, but can be tuned by adjusting the timing. Modified motors can only modify the lower leg and propeller. Super Modified can modify the entire engine as long as factory parts are used.

== History ==
Bathtub racing started in Nanaimo, British Columbia. The idea was conceived to showcase Nanaimo to the world, with the first races beginning with the "Nanaimo to Vancouver Great International World Championship Bathtub Race" in 1967.

Frank Ney, Nanaimo's mayor at the time, was one of the largest supporters and promoters of the annual race from its establishment until his death in 1992, and was an avid participant. He would regularly dress as a pirate and tour the town and surrounding communities.

Until the 1990s, the race was held as a part of Vancouver's annual Sea Festival, a.k.a. Sea Fest, when tubbers raced from Nanaimo to Vancouver's Kitsilano Beach. With the demise of the Vancouver Marine Festival in the mid-1990s, the race now involves a course beginning and ending in Nanaimo Harbour.

The current course takes the tubbers into the open waters of Georgia Strait and is currently 58 kilometres (36 mi) in length. The race is held the last weekend of July every year.

Other cities, like Auckland's North Shore with its Englefield Bathtub Derby, and Bremerton, Washington with the US-Canadian Friendship race now hold bathtub races, but the Nanaimo event continues to be the most widely known.
