= Mike Hunter (politician) =

Canadian politician

MLA for Nanaimo
- In office May 16, 2001 – May 17, 2005
- Preceded by: Dale Lovick
- Succeeded by: Leonard Krog

Personal details
- Born: May 7, 1947 (age 79) Chesterfield, England, UK
- Party: BC Liberal
- Education: University of Leicester (B.A.); Simon Fraser University (M.A.)

Mike Hunter (born May 7, 1947) was a Liberal member of the Legislative Assembly of British Columbia for the riding of Nanaimo, he served in that capacity from 2001 to 2005. He was the first non-New Democrat elected in the riding since the 1969 provincial election. As of May 2024, he is the last non-New Democrat to be elected in the riding.

Prior to becoming a politician, Hunter was the head of the British Columbia Fisheries Council, an industry association of companies active in the west coast fishery of Canada. He was also involved with the British Columbia Seafood Sector Council, a joint business-labour organization that promoted collaborative solutions to problems in the British Columbia seafood processing industry.

In the 2005 provincial election, Hunter lost his seat to former NDP leadership candidate Leonard Krog.
