= Buttertubs Marsh =

Bird sanctuary in Canada

Coordinates: 49°10′15″N 123°58′22″W

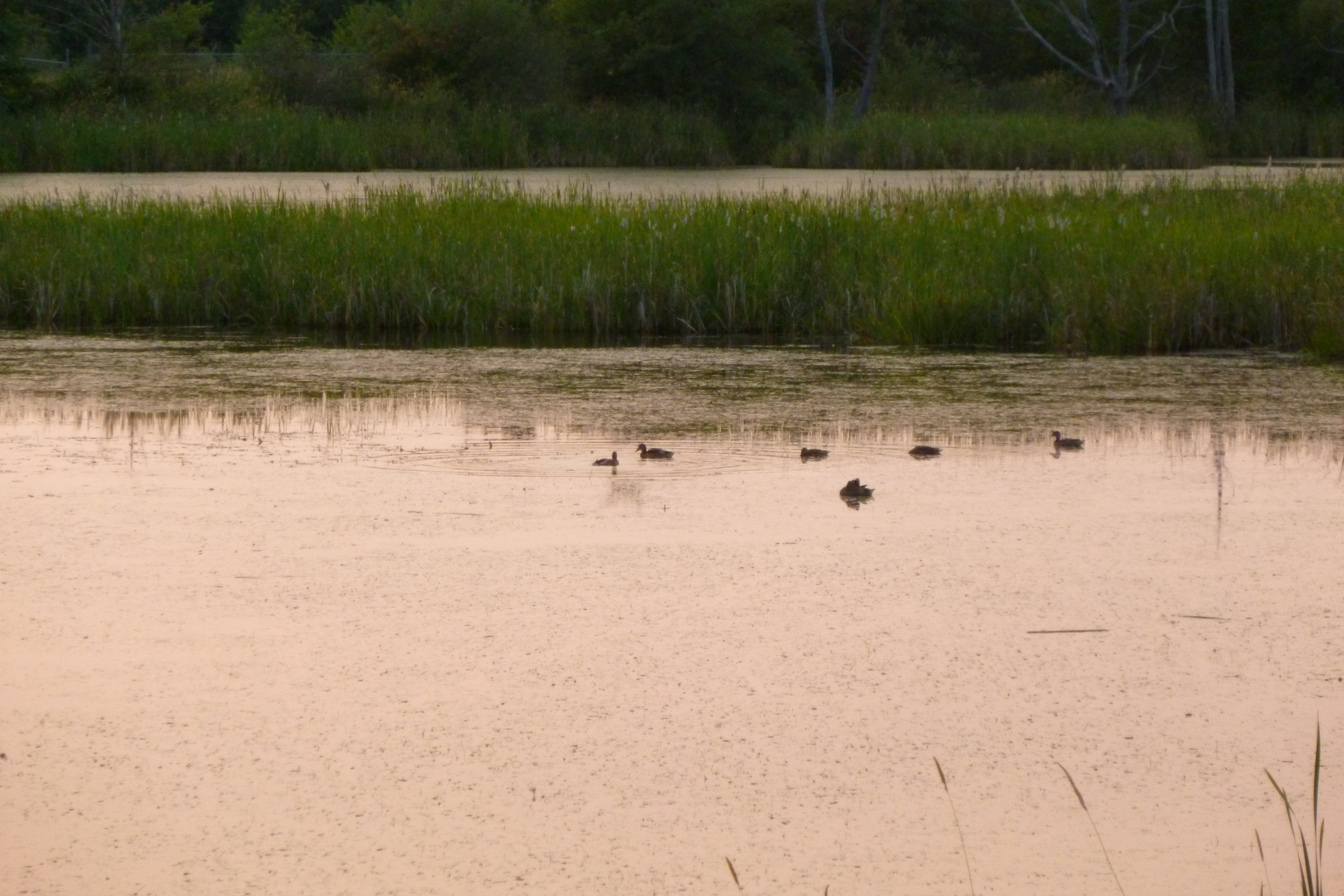
Dusk at Buttertubs Marsh

Buttertubs Marsh is a bird sanctuary in Nanaimo, British Columbia, Canada.

== Description ==
Located in the middle of the city of Nanaimo, and bordering the Millstone River, the marsh covers approximately 100 acres (40 hectares). Within this is the 46 acre (18.7 hectare) Buttertubs Marsh Conservation Area, owned by the Nature Trust of British Columbia.

Being surrounded by more urbanized land, the marsh is especially important as a refuge for birds to breed, winter, or rest during migration.

Visitors can explore the marsh using a trail that loops around its area, with observation decks that facilitate birdwatching.

== Wildlife ==
The marsh is man-made and is home to great blue herons, wood ducks, belted kingfishers, mergansers, common yellowthroats and red-winged blackbirds.

The sanctuary is Vancouver Island's only documented breeding site of American bittern.

Reptiles as well as birds live in the marsh, including western painted turtles, which are endangered, and red-eared slider, which are non-native species.

== History ==
The Buttertubs Marsh area was a shallow lake before the mid-1800s, then it was drained to facilitate European dairy and potato farming. In 1970, the Nature Trust of Canada purchased a section of the area.

== Management ==
In 2012, the Buttertubs West Marsh area was purchased by Ducks Unlimited Canada and the City of Nanaimo. Because this land was purchased under Canada's ecological gift program, the land is not permitted to be developed or be significantly altered from its current state.

Vancouver Island University has operated an avian monitoring program in Buttertubs Marsh since 2013.
