= Joy Leach =

Canadian politician (1942–2014)

Joy Leach (born 1942 in Nanaimo, died August 2014 in Nanaimo) was a Canadian politician. She was Nanaimo's first female mayor and former president of the BC School Trustees Association and a Nanaimo school board trustee.

== Biography ==
Leach grew up in Parksville, British Columbia, where both her father and grandfather were politicians. She was the first female president of Qualicum's high school. In 1977, she was elected to Nanaimo's board of school trustees; over the next seven years, she served as chair three times and became president of the BC School Trustees Association.

For a time, Leach lived in Munich, working on a US army base, before marrying her first husband and living throughout the US and then returning to Nanaimo in the early 1970s.

Leach was mayor from 1990 to 1993. Leach was also a long-time school trustee and owned a consulting firm and raised funds for both Simon Fraser University and Malaspina College (VIU).

She was elected after defeating long-time mayor Frank Ney, with a campaign focusing on community planning. She established the Imagine Nanaimo project, a first attempt at the city's official community plan.

She also saw 140 percent increase in water rates, which was to shift water costs to usage instead of taxes. She increased sewer fees 40 percent and also increased property taxes and senior staff salaries.

She lost the 1993 election to Gary Korpan.

She also chaired the BC Round Table on the Environment and Economy and served on a BC Ferries operations task force, we well as the BC Public Service appeals board.

Leach was married to Michael Legge and had four children.
