= Jan Pullinger =

Canadian politician (born 1947)

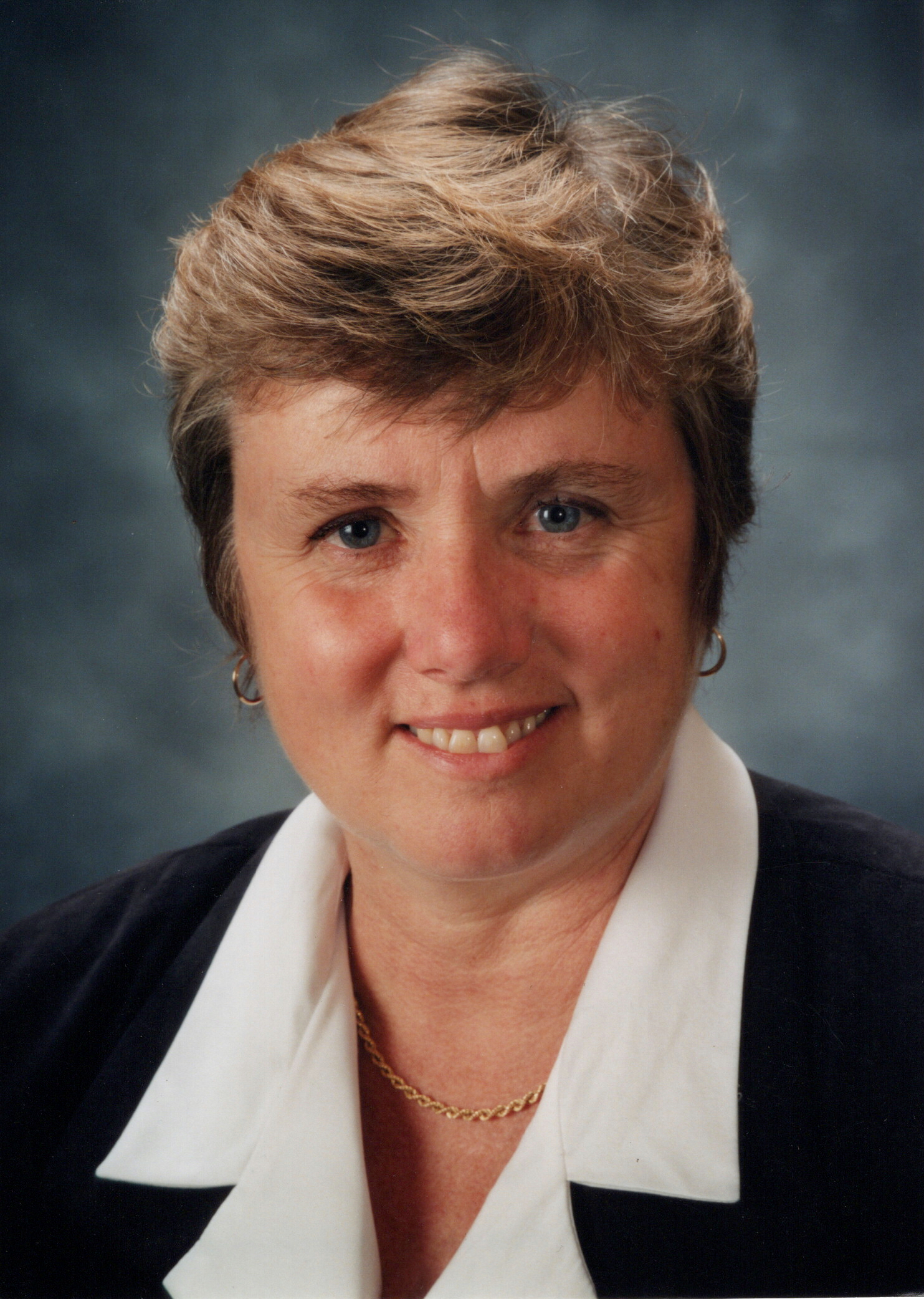

Member of the British Columbia Legislative Assembly for Cowichan-Ladysmith
- In office October 17, 1991 – May 16, 2001
- Preceded by: Riding Established
- Succeeded by: Graham Bruce

Member of the British Columbia Legislative Assembly for Nanaimo
- In office March 15, 1989 – October 17, 1991 Serving with Dale Lovick (1989-1991)
- Preceded by: Dave Stupich
- Succeeded by: Dale Lovick

Personal details
- Born: 1947 (age 78–79)
- Party: New Democrat

Janis Margaret "Jan" Pullinger (born 1947) is a former Canadian politician who was a member of the Legislative Assembly of British Columbia from 1989 to 2001. She was a member of the British Columbia New Democratic Party.

Pullinger was first elected to the Legislative Assembly in a 1989 by-election, succeeding Dave Stupich in the riding of Nanaimo. In what was then a dual-member district, she served alongside Dale Lovick, whom she would later marry. In the 1991 election, the electoral districts were realigned and Pullinger ran in the new riding of Cowichan-Ladysmith, which she represented for two terms until her retirement from politics in 2001, while Lovick continued to represent Nanaimo.

She served in the Executive Council of British Columbia, as Minister of Small Business, Tourism and Culture, Minister of Human Resources, Minister of Community Development, Co-Operatives and Volunteers, and Minister of Social Development and Economic Security.

In 2026, Pullinger endorsed Avi Lewis in that year's federal NDP leadership race.

== Electoral record ==
B.C. General Election 1996: Cowichan-Ladysmith
Party	Candidate	Votes	%	±	Expenditures
NDP	Jan Pullinger	12,249	49.85%		$32,625
Liberal	Ray Smith	7,783	31.68%		$14,683
Reform	Tom Walker	2,434	9.91%		$14,763
Progressive Democrat	Perry James Johnston	1,459	5.94%	–	$1,983
Green	Julian West	645	2.63%	–	$3,167
Total valid votes		24,570	100.00%		
Total rejected ballots		117	0.47%		
Turnout		24,687	73.97%		

B.C. General Election 1991: Cowichan-Ladysmith
Party	Candidate	Votes	%	±	Expenditures
NDP	Jan Pullinger	11,038	48.53%		$42,602
Social Credit	Graham Bruce	6,809	29.94%	–	$65,164
Liberal	Anthony M. Hennig	4,896	21.53%		$4,797
Total valid votes		22,743	100.00%		
Total rejected ballots		374	1.62%		
Turnout		23,117	78.60%		
