= Cowichan-Malahat =

Electoral district in British Columbia, Canada

Cowichan-Malahat was a provincial electoral district in the Canadian province of British Columbia. It first appeared in the general election of 1966. In the 1991 general election, it was succeeded by Cowichan-Ladysmith and Malahat-Juan de Fuca.

== MLAs elected ==
Parliament	Term	MLA
28th	1966–1969	Robert Martin Strachan
29th	1969–1972	Robert Martin Strachan
30th	1972–1975	Robert Martin Strachan
31st	1975–1979	Barbara Wallace
32nd	1979–1983	Barbara Wallace
33rd	1983–1986	Barbara Wallace
34th	1986–1991	Graham Bruce

== Election results ==
=== Elections ===
1966 British Columbia general election
Party	Candidate	Votes	%	±%
New Democratic	Robert Martin Strachan	5,646	52.08	–
Social Credit	Patrick James Rogers	4,412	40.70	–
Liberal	Joseph Haddock	783	7.22	–
Total valid votes		10,841	100.00	
Total rejected ballots		81	0.74	

1969 British Columbia general election
Party	Candidate	Votes	%	±%
New Democratic	Robert Martin Strachan	7,411	47.78	-4.30
Social Credit	Charles McGregor Ennals	7,107	45.82	5.12
Liberal	James Robert Bigsby	916	5.91	-1.31
Independent	Kenneth Leslie Craig Hassenen	76	0.49	New
Total valid votes		15,510	100.00	
Total rejected ballots		127	0.81	

1972 British Columbia general election
Party	Candidate	Votes	%	±%
New Democratic	Robert Martin Strachan	10,672	58.51	10.73
Social Credit	Kathleen Grouhel	4,555	24.97	-20.85
Progressive Conservative	GJames William Quaife	2,101	11.52	New
Liberal	Daniel R. Clemmens	842	4.62	-1.29
Independent	Kenneth Leslie Craig Hassenen	70	0.38	-0.11
Total valid votes		18,240	100.00	
Total rejected ballots		203	1.10	

1975 British Columbia general election
Party	Candidate	Votes	%	±%
New Democratic	Barbara Wallace	10,245	47.73	-10.78
Social Credit	Charles McGregor Ennals	9,066	42.24	17.27
Liberal	Jevington Blair Tothill	1,595	7.43	2.81
Independent	Andrew Basil Bigg	559	2.60	2.22
Total valid votes		21,465	100.00	
Total rejected ballots		188	0.87	

1979 British Columbia general election
Party	Candidate	Votes	%	±%
New Democratic	Barbara Wallace	9,839	52.62	4.89
Social Credit	Henry Rex Hollett	7,746	41.43	-0.81
Progressive Conservative	Kenneth Paskin	1,113	5.95	Returned
Total valid votes		18,698	100.00	
Total rejected ballots		180	0.95	

1983 British Columbia general election
Party	Candidate	Votes	%	±%
New Democratic	Barbara Wallace	11,655	51.00	-1.62
Social Credit	Graham Bruce	10,143	44.38	2.95
Western Canada Concept	James Ivan Turnbull	609	2.67	New
Liberal	Irwin Wield (Bill) Steele	345	1.51	Returned
Independent	Louis James Lesosky	101	0.44	New
Total valid votes		22,853	100.00	
Total rejected ballots		245	1.06	

1986 British Columbia general election
Party	Candidate	Votes	%	±%
Social Credit	Graham Bruce	11,744	50.96	6.58
New Democratic	Carolyn Judith Askew	10,442	45.31	-5.69
Liberal	Paul Olthof	860	3.73	2.22
Total valid votes		23,046	100.00	
Total rejected ballots		317	1.36	

=== Timeline (1966-1986) ===
Graph of Cowichan-Malahat election results by share of votes, 1966–1986.
