= Port Theatre =

Theatre in Nanaimo, British Columbia

The Port Theatre
- Interactive map of The Port Theatre
- Address: 125 Front Street; Nanaimo, British Columbia; V9R 6Z4
- Coordinates: 49.16601795412946°N 123.93519963120046°W
- Owner: City of Nanaimo
- Operator: Port Theatre Society
- Type: Performing arts centre

Construction
- Opened: 1998

Tenants
- Vancouver Island Symphony Orchestra, Crimson Coast Dance, TheatreOne, Nanaimo International Jazz Festival

Website
- www.porttheatre.com

The Port Theatre is community arts centre and venue located in Nanaimo, British Columbia. It was built by The Port Theatre Society and the City of Nanaimo, and was officially opened in September 1998.

The building is located on the waterfront, and houses an 804-seat theatre, several galleries, and offices.

The venue is home to the Vancouver Island Symphony Orchestra and several local professional and community groups. The Society also presents shows from national and international artists.

The Port Theatre won the 2005 Sterling Award for Business Excellence in Arts/Culture/Entertainment from the Nanaimo Chamber of Commerce, 2004 the Presenter Organization of the Year by the Canadian Arts Presenting Association, and named the 2025 BC Live Performance Network Presenter of the Year for their role in boundary pushing programming, reconciliation, and leadership.
