= Barbara Wallace (politician) =

Canadian politician

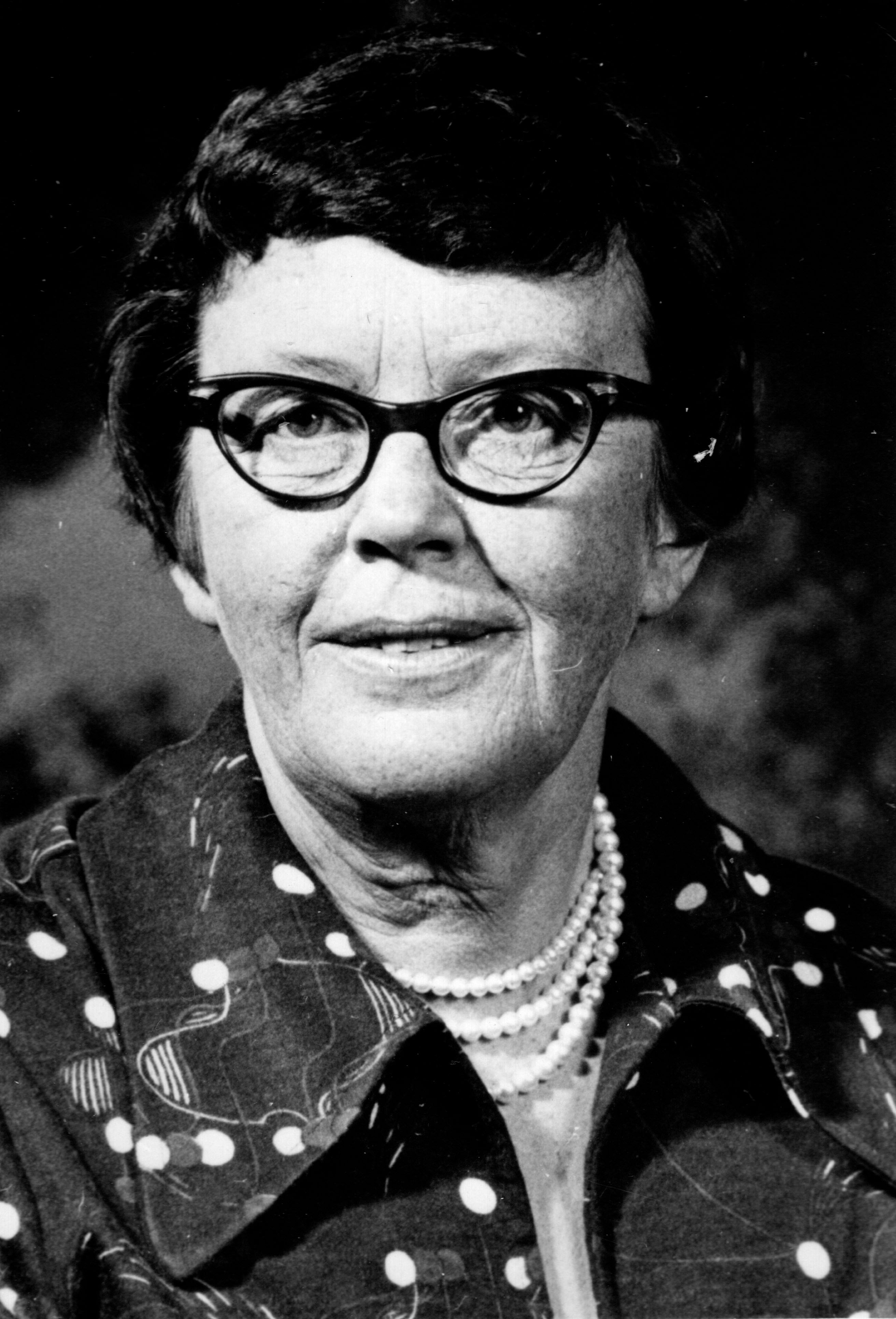

Barbara Brookman Wallace (March 24, 1918 – November 12, 2011) was a political figure in British Columbia. She represented Cowichan-Malahat in the Legislative Assembly of British Columbia from 1975 to 1986 as a New Democratic Party (NDP) member.

She was born Barbara Brookman Wager, the daughter of Clarence Wager, in Coronation, Alberta and came to Vancouver Island with her family during the 1930s. In 1941, she married Bob Wallace. She worked for Vancouver Island Power Commission and then BC Hydro before entering politics. Wallace did not run for reelection in 1986. She died in Ladysmith at the age of 93.
