= Nanaimo =

City in British Columbia, Canada

- City
- City of Nanaimo
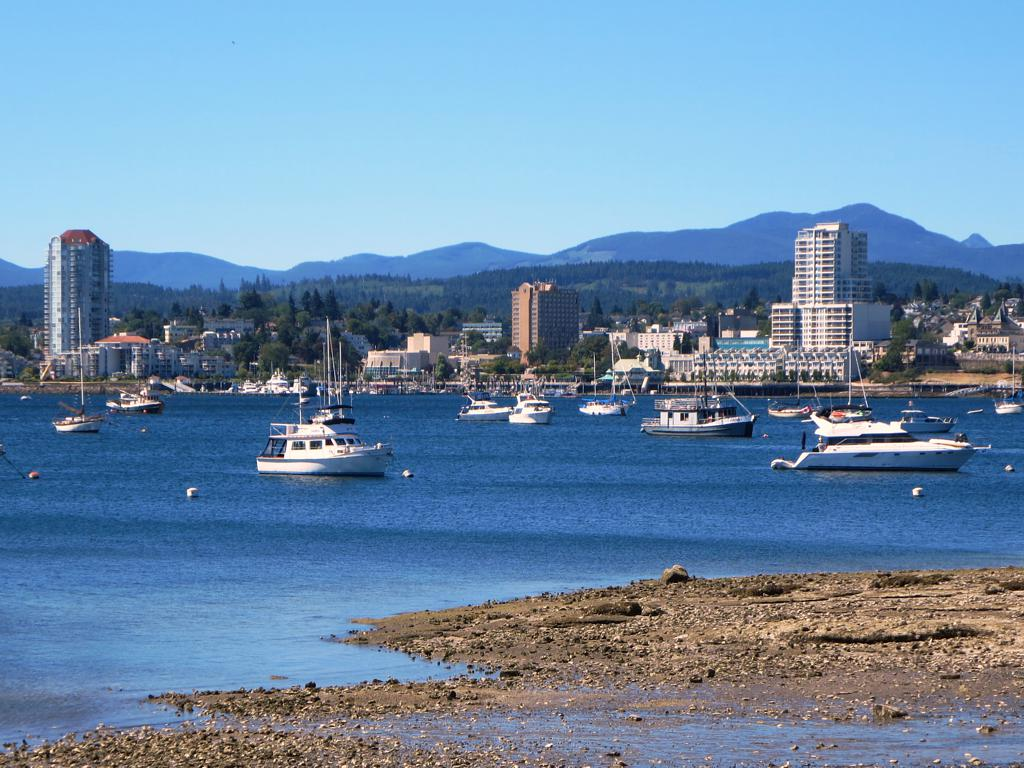
- Skyline of Nanaimo

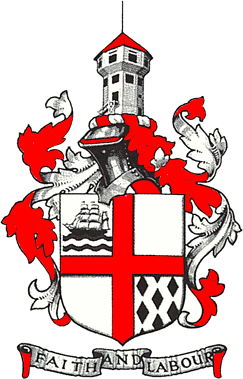
- Flag Coat of arms
- Nicknames: Hub City, The Harbour City
- Location of Nanaimo in British Columbia Nanaimo (British Columbia)
- Coordinates: 49°09′51″N 123°56′11″W
- Country: Canada
- Province: British Columbia
- Regional district: Nanaimo
- Incorporated: 1874

Government
  - Type: Elected city council
  - Body: Nanaimo City Council: Sheryl Armstrong; Marnie Boers; Andréa Coutu; Hilary Eastmure; Ben Geselbracht; Erin Hemmens; Paul Manly; Ian Thorpe
  - Mayor: Leonard Krog
  - MP: Tamara Kronis
  - MLA: Sheila Malcolmson

Area
  - City: 91.30 km^{2} (35.25 sq mi)
  - Metro: 1,280.84 km^{2} (494.54 sq mi)
- Elevation: 28 m (92 ft)

Population (2021)
  - City: 99,863 (ranked 57th)
  - Density: 1,104.1/km^{2} (2,860/sq mi)
  - Urban: 96,415
  - Metro: 129,750 (ranked 35th)
  - Metro density: 76.5/km^{2} (198/sq mi)
- Demonym: Nanaimoite
- Time zone: UTC−07:00 (PT)
- Forward sortation area: V9R – V9V, V9X
- Area codes: 250, 778, 236, 672
- Website: nanaimo.ca

Nanaimo (/nəˈnaɪmoʊ/ nə-NY-moh) is a city on the east coast of Vancouver Island in British Columbia, Canada. The city lies on the western shores of the eponymous Nanaimo Harbour, for which it has become known as the "Harbour City". The city is also called the "Hub City", which is attributed to its original layout design with streets radiating from the shoreline like the spokes of a wagon wheel, and to its relatively central location on Vancouver Island. Nanaimo is the headquarters of the Regional District of Nanaimo.

Nanaimo is served by the Island Highway that runs along the east coast of Vancouver Island, the BC Ferries system, and the city's regional airport. It is also on the dormant Island Rail Corridor.

== History ==
=== Early history ===
The Indigenous peoples of the area that is now known as Nanaimo are the Snuneymuxw. An anglicized spelling and pronunciation of that word gave the city its current name.

The first Europeans known to reach Nanaimo Harbour were members of the 1791 Spanish voyage of Juan Carrasco, under the command of Francisco de Eliza. They gave it the name Bocas de Winthuysen after naval officer Francisco Javier Winthuysen y Pineda. When the British Hudson's Bay Company (HBC) established a settlement here in 1852, they named it Colvile Town after HBC governor Andrew Colvile. In 1858 it was renamed as Nanaimo, after the local indigenous people. The city has been called "the Harbour City" since the lead-up to Expo 86.

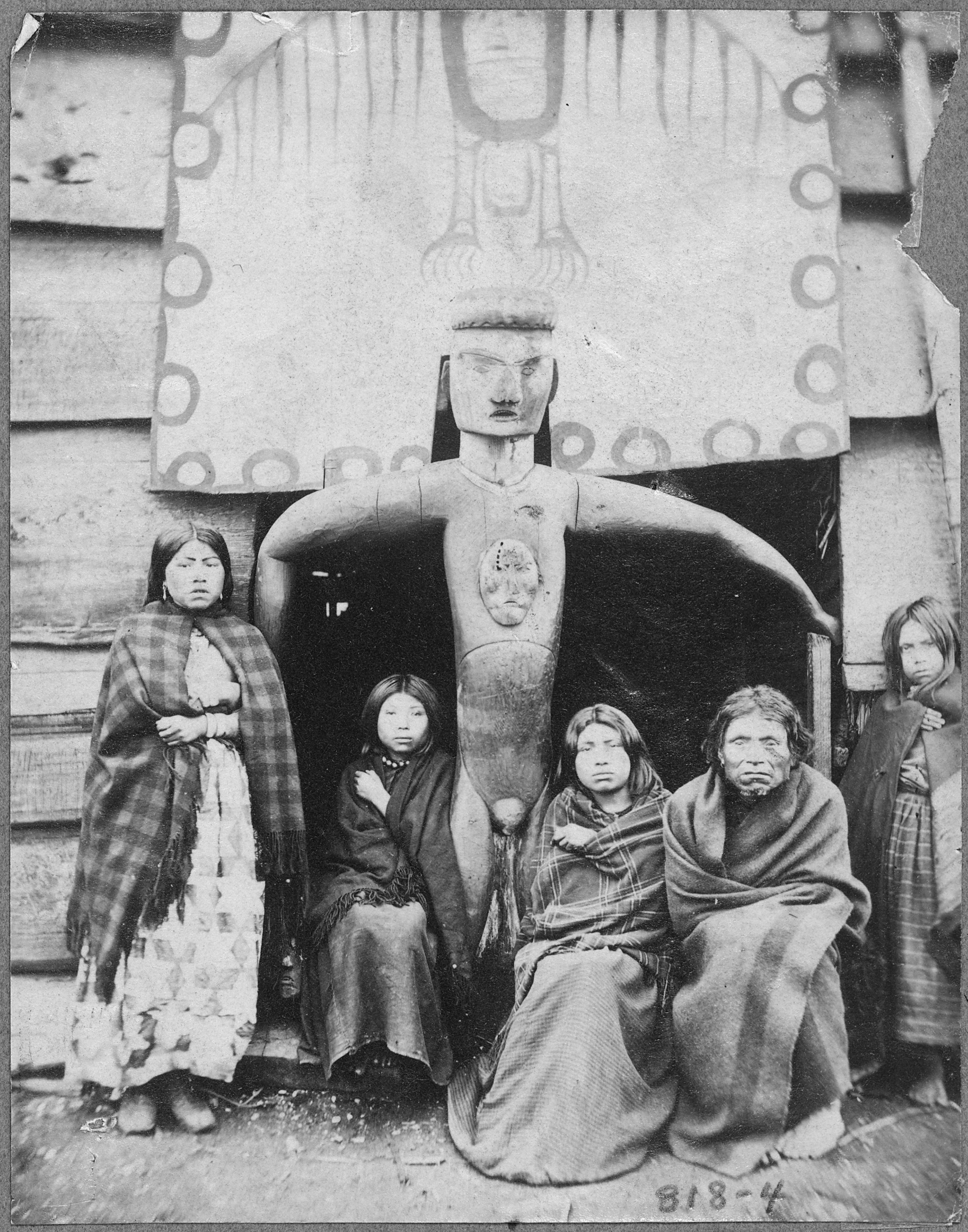
Indigenous Nanaimo people

The HBC attempted to start a coal mine at Port Rupert but the project had been unsuccessful. In 1850 Snuneymuxw Chief Che-wich-i-kan, commonly known as "Coal Tyee", brought samples of coal to Victoria. A company clerk was dispatched and eventually the governor James Douglas visited the future site of Nanaimo.

While open to selling coal, the Snuneymuxw wished to retain control of it and retain the exclusive right to mine it. Chief Wun-wun-shum offered to sell coal for five barrels in exchange for one blanket. The HBC representative Joseph William McKay deemed this "impertinent". The Snuneymuxw retained their rights to the resource for a while, but gradually lost them due to other tribes and miners from the failed Port Rupert project.

By 1852, the first shipment of Nanaimo coal was loaded on the Cadboro.

Construction of the Nanaimo Bastion began in 1853 and was finished in 1855.

On 27 November 1854, 24 coal miners and their families from England arrived at the settlement aboard the Beaver and Recovery. They had travelled seven months on the ship Princess Royal arriving at Esquimalt two days earlier. They transferred to the two smaller vessels for the trip to Colvile Town. They were greeted by Joseph William McKay and 21 Scottish miners.

=== World Wars ===
During World War I, the provincial government established an internment camp for Ukrainian detainees, many of them local, at a provincial jail in Nanaimo. It operated from September 1914 to September 1915.

In the 1940s, lumber supplanted coal as the main business. Minetown Days have been celebrated in the neighbouring community of Lantzville to highlight some of the locale's history.

=== Chinese population ===
In the late nineteenth century, numerous immigrants came from China and settled here. What was known as the first Chinatown in Nanaimo was founded during the gold rush years of the 1860s; it was the third largest in British Columbia. In 1884, because of mounting racial tensions related to the Dunsmuir coal company's hiring of Chinese strikebreakers, the company helped move Chinatown to a location outside city limits.

In 1908, when two Chinese entrepreneurs bought the site and tried to raise rents, the community and 4,000 shareholders from across Canada combined forces and bought a site for the third Chinatown, at a new location focused on Pine Street. That third Chinatown burned down on 30 September 1960 but it was by then mostly derelict and abandoned. A fourth Chinatown, also called Lower Chinatown or "new town", boomed for a while in the 1920s on Machleary Street.

== Location and geography ==
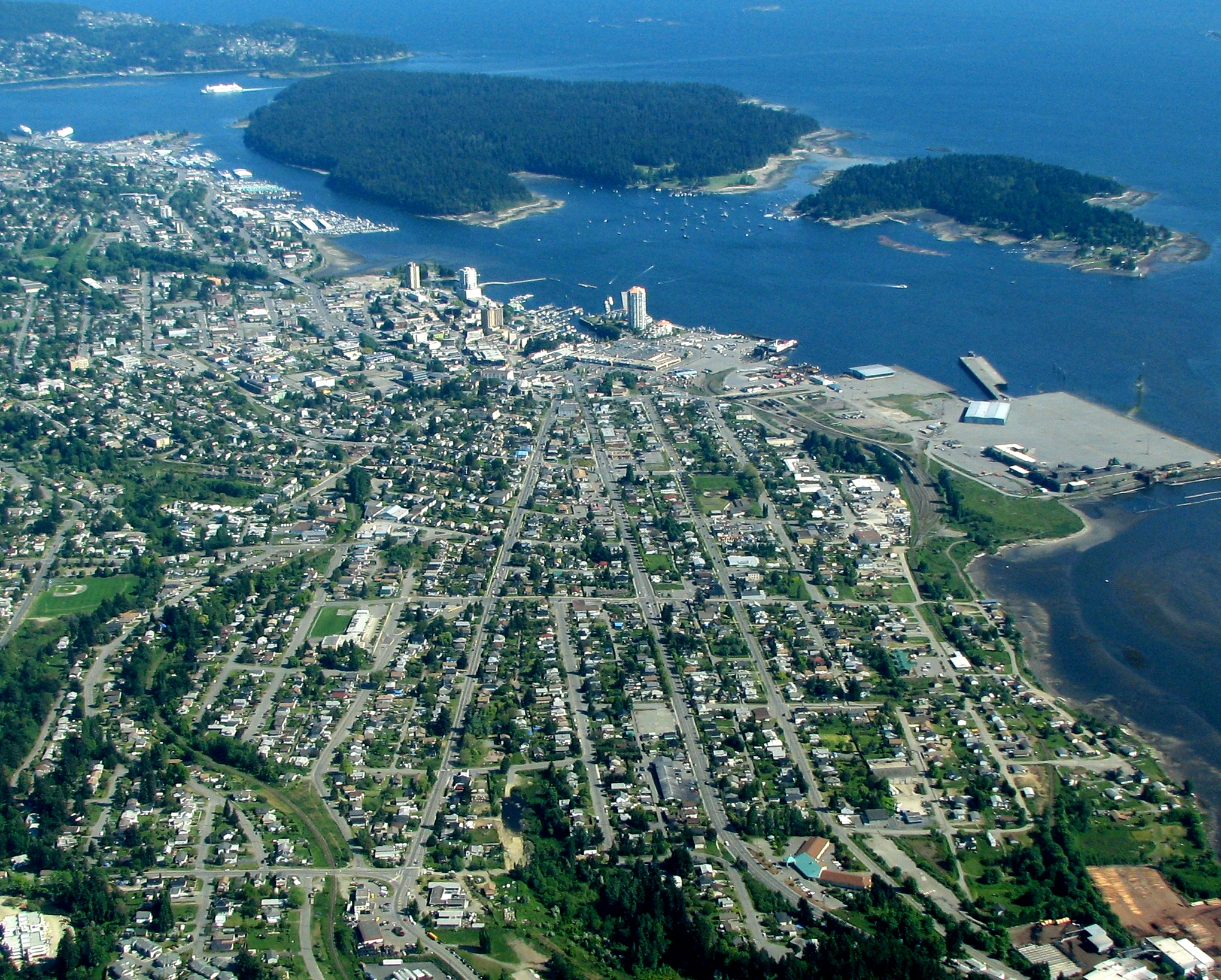
Aerial photo of downtown and central Nanaimo and adjacent islands

Situated on the east coast of Vancouver Island, Nanaimo is about 111 kilometres (69 mi) northwest of Victoria, and 55 kilometres (34 mi) west of Vancouver, separated by the Strait of Georgia, and linked to Vancouver via the Horseshoe Bay BC Ferries terminal in West Vancouver and the Duke Point terminal to the Tsawwassen ferry terminal in Tsawwassen. As the site of the main ferry terminal, Nanaimo is the gateway to many other destinations both on the northern part of the island—Tofino, Comox Valley, Parksville, Campbell River, Port Alberni, Rathtrevor Beach Provincial Park—and off its coast—Saysutshun, Protection Island, Gabriola Island, Valdes Island, and many other of the Gulf Islands. A private passenger ferry service connecting to Vancouver, named Hullo, began operating in August 2023.

Buttertubs Marsh is a bird sanctuary located in the middle of the city. The marsh covers approximately 100 acres (40 ha). Within this is the 46-acre (19 ha) Buttertubs Marsh Conservation Area, owned by the Nature Trust of British Columbia.

=== Climate ===
Like much of coastal British Columbia, Nanaimo experiences a temperate climate with mild, rainy winters and warm, dry summers. Due to its relatively dry summers, the Köppen climate classification places it at the northernmost limits of the Csb or warm-summer Mediterranean zone. Other climate classification systems, such as Trewartha, place it firmly in the Oceanic zone (Do).

Nanaimo is usually shielded from the Aleutian Low's influence by the mountains of central Vancouver Island, so that summers are unusually dry for its latitude and location—though summer drying as a trend is found in the immediate lee of the coastal ranges as far north as Skagway, Alaska.

Heavy snowfall does occasionally occur during winter, with a record daily total of 74 centimetres (29.13 in) on 12 February 1975, but the mean maximum cover is only 20 centimetres (7.9 in).

The highest temperature ever recorded in Nanaimo was 40.6 °C (105 °F) on 16 July 1941. The coldest temperature ever recorded was −20.0 °C (−4 °F) on 30 December 1968.

Climate data for Nanaimo Airport, 1981–2010 normals, extremes 1892–present (Note: Extreme high and low temperatures are from Nanaimo (January 1892 to February 1947) and Nanaimo Airport (March 1947 to present).)
| Month | Jan | Feb | Mar | Apr | May | Jun | Jul | Aug | Sep | Oct | Nov | Dec | Year |
|---|---|---|---|---|---|---|---|---|---|---|---|---|---|
| Record high °C (°F) | 15.6 (60.1) | 18.3 (64.9) | 21.7 (71.1) | 27.0 (80.6) | 34.3 (93.7) | 40.5 (104.9) | 40.6 (105.1) | 36.7 (98.1) | 33.2 (91.8) | 29.3 (84.7) | 19.4 (66.9) | 18.2 (64.8) | 40.6 (105.1) |
| Mean daily maximum °C (°F) | 6.9 (44.4) | 8.5 (47.3) | 11.0 (51.8) | 14.1 (57.4) | 17.7 (63.9) | 20.8 (69.4) | 23.9 (75.0) | 24.3 (75.7) | 20.9 (69.6) | 14.6 (58.3) | 9.3 (48.7) | 6.3 (43.3) | 14.8 (58.6) |
| Daily mean °C (°F) | 3.5 (38.3) | 4.3 (39.7) | 6.3 (43.3) | 9.0 (48.2) | 12.5 (54.5) | 15.6 (60.1) | 18.1 (64.6) | 18.2 (64.8) | 14.9 (58.8) | 9.9 (49.8) | 5.6 (42.1) | 3.1 (37.6) | 10.1 (50.2) |
| Mean daily minimum °C (°F) | 0.1 (32.2) | 0.0 (32.0) | 1.7 (35.1) | 3.9 (39.0) | 7.2 (45.0) | 10.3 (50.5) | 12.3 (54.1) | 12.1 (53.8) | 8.9 (48.0) | 5.2 (41.4) | 1.8 (35.2) | −0.2 (31.6) | 5.3 (41.5) |
| Record low °C (°F) | −18.3 (−0.9) | −17.2 (1.0) | −12.2 (10.0) | −5 (23) | −4.4 (24.1) | 0.6 (33.1) | 2.8 (37.0) | 3.3 (37.9) | −1.1 (30.0) | −6.7 (19.9) | −16.1 (3.0) | −20 (−4) | −20 (−4) |
| Average precipitation mm (inches) | 187.9 (7.40) | 126.0 (4.96) | 113.0 (4.45) | 67.4 (2.65) | 54.3 (2.14) | 43.4 (1.71) | 25.4 (1.00) | 28.4 (1.12) | 35.8 (1.41) | 102.2 (4.02) | 197.2 (7.76) | 184.3 (7.26) | 1,165.4 (45.88) |
| Average rainfall mm (inches) | 167.8 (6.61) | 115.2 (4.54) | 106.9 (4.21) | 67.2 (2.65) | 54.2 (2.13) | 43.4 (1.71) | 25.4 (1.00) | 28.4 (1.12) | 35.8 (1.41) | 101.2 (3.98) | 186.5 (7.34) | 166.1 (6.54) | 1,098.2 (43.24) |
| Average snowfall cm (inches) | 21.0 (8.3) | 10.9 (4.3) | 6.2 (2.4) | 0.2 (0.1) | 0.1 (0.0) | 0.0 (0.0) | 0.0 (0.0) | 0.0 (0.0) | 0.0 (0.0) | 1.2 (0.5) | 10.7 (4.2) | 18.4 (7.2) | 68.7 (27.0) |
| Average precipitation days (≥ 0.2 mm) | 19.7 | 16.0 | 18.2 | 15.6 | 14.8 | 12.4 | 7.6 | 6.8 | 8.2 | 15.5 | 20.5 | 20.4 | 175.6 |
| Average rainy days (≥ 0.2 mm) | 18.0 | 14.9 | 17.8 | 15.6 | 14.8 | 12.4 | 7.6 | 6.8 | 8.2 | 15.4 | 19.8 | 18.8 | 170.0 |
| Average snowy days (≥ 0.2 cm) | 3.1 | 2.3 | 1.0 | 0.0 | 0.1 | 0.0 | 0.0 | 0.0 | 0.0 | 0.1 | 1.2 | 3.2 | 11.0 |
| Average relative humidity (%) (at 3pm) | 81.5 | 71.1 | 65.5 | 59.6 | 57.8 | 57.0 | 52.7 | 52.1 | 56.2 | 68.5 | 78.4 | 83.2 | 65.3 |
| Mean monthly sunshine hours | 56.8 | 88.6 | 133.1 | 179.0 | 224.4 | 226.1 | 288.8 | 280.0 | 213.9 | 131.9 | 67.0 | 50.8 | 1,940.2 |
| Percentage possible sunshine | 21.0 | 31.0 | 36.2 | 43.6 | 47.4 | 46.7 | 59.1 | 62.8 | 56.4 | 39.3 | 24.3 | 19.7 | 40.6 |
Source: Environment Canada

== Transportation ==
Nanaimo is served by two airports: Nanaimo Airport (YCD) with services to Vancouver (YVR), Toronto (YYZ), and Calgary (YYC) and Nanaimo Harbour Water Aerodrome (ZNA) with services to Vancouver Harbour (CXH), Vancouver Airport (YVR South Terminal), and Sechelt (YHS);.

In total, Nanaimo has three BC Ferry terminals, located at Departure Bay, Duke Point, and Nanaimo Harbour. The downtown terminal services Gabriola Island while Departure Bay and Duke Point service Horseshoe Bay and Tsawwassen respectively.

A private passenger ferry operates between Nanaimo Harbour and Protection Island. A seasonal passenger ferry operates between Swy-a-Lana Lagoon and Saysutshun (Newcastle Island Marine) Park.

Since 2023, Hullo has operated a high speed passenger-only ferry service between downtown Nanaimo and downtown Vancouver. Travel time between the cities is 75 minutes.

Highways 1, 19, and 19A traverse the city. Highway 19 (Nanaimo Parkway) acts as an expressway bypass to the west of Nanaimo while Highway 1, then Highway 19A traverses the length of Nanaimo as an arterial road within the city proper.

Bus service in the city is provided by Nanaimo Regional Transit and offers city-wide service as well as region service connecting Parksville and Qualicum Beach to the north, and Ladysmith and Duncan to the south.

The Island Rail Corridor passes through Nanaimo and has a base of operations and yard in the downtown waterfront area.

Nanaimo Port Authority operates the inner Harbour Basin marina providing mooring for smaller vessels and the W. E. Mills Landing and Marina providing mooring for larger vessels. It also operates two terminal facilities one at Assembly Wharf (near the downtown core) and the second at Duke Point for cargo operations. In 2011, the Authority completed the addition of a $22 million cruise ship terminal at Assembly Wharf capable of handling large cruise ships including providing Canada Border Services Agency clearance.

== Demographics ==
In the 2021 Canadian census conducted by Statistics Canada, Nanaimo had a population of 99,863 living in 43,164 of its 45,138 total private dwellings, an increase of 10.3% from its 2016 population of 90,504. With a land area of 90.45 km^{2} (34.92 sq mi), it had a population density of 1,104.1/km^{2} (2,859.5/sq mi) in 2021.

At the census metropolitan area (CMA) level in the 2021 census, the Nanaimo CMA had a population of 115,459 living in 49,348 of its 51,568 total private dwellings, a change of 10% from its 2016 population of 104,936. With a land area of 1,279.28 km^{2} (493.93 sq mi), it had a population density of 90.3/km^{2} (233.8/sq mi) in 2021.

In 2016, the average age of a Nanaimoite is 45.5 years old, higher than the national median at 41.2.

In Nanaimo, there are 40,885 private dwellings, 39,165 which are occupied by usual residents (95.8% occupancy rate). The median value of these dwellings is $359,760, which is higher than the national median at $341,556. The average (after-tax) household income in Nanaimo is $48,469, lower than the national median at $54,089. The median individual income is $34,702, which is also lower than the national median ($38,977). The unemployment rate was 7.7%.

=== Ethnicity ===
Largest ethnic origin in Nanaimo CMA by census tract based on the 2021 census

The most common ethnicities in Nanaimo as per the 2021 census are English (31.1%), Scottish (22.5%), Irish (16.9%), German (13.2%), Canadian (12.6%), French (8.7%), Ukrainian (5.1%), Dutch (4.7%), and Norwegian (3.7%).

Panethnic groups in the City of Nanaimo (2001−2021)
| Panethnic group | 2021 | | 2016 | | 2011 | | 2006 | | 2001 | |
| Panethnic group | Pop. | % | Pop. | % | Pop. | % | Pop. | % | Pop. | % |
|---|---|---|---|---|---|---|---|---|---|---|
| European (Note: Statistic includes all persons that did not make up part of a visible minority or an indigenous identity.) | 75,815 | 78.14% | 72,560 | 82.78% | 70,455 | 86.38% | 67,275 | 86.66% | 63,540 | 88.49% |
| Indigenous | 7,905 | 8.15% | 6,405 | 7.31% | 5,115 | 6.27% | 4,060 | 5.23% | 3,380 | 4.71% |
| East Asian (Note: Statistic includes total responses of "Chinese", "Korean", and "Japanese" under visible minority section on census.) | 4,220 | 4.35% | 3,220 | 3.67% | 2,200 | 2.7% | 2,235 | 2.88% | 1,615 | 2.25% |
| South Asian | 3,095 | 3.19% | 1,900 | 2.17% | 1,525 | 1.87% | 1,855 | 2.39% | 1,265 | 1.76% |
| Southeast Asian (Note: Statistic includes total responses of "Filipino" and "Southeast Asian" under visible minority section on census.) | 2,670 | 2.75% | 1,715 | 1.96% | 1,090 | 1.34% | 1,210 | 1.56% | 1,335 | 1.86% |
| African | 1,180 | 1.22% | 625 | 0.71% | 400 | 0.49% | 380 | 0.49% | 220 | 0.31% |
| Middle Eastern (Note: Statistic includes total responses of "West Asian" and "Arab" under visible minority section on census.) | 740 | 0.76% | 445 | 0.51% | 195 | 0.24% | 145 | 0.19% | 95 | 0.13% |
| Latin American | 710 | 0.73% | 465 | 0.53% | 270 | 0.33% | 150 | 0.19% | 195 | 0.27% |
| Other/multiracial (Note: Statistic includes total responses of "Visible minority, n.i.e." and "Multiple visible minorities" under visible minority section on census.) | 685 | 0.71% | 320 | 0.37% | 310 | 0.38% | 310 | 0.4% | 175 | 0.24% |
| Total responses | 97,020 | 97.15% | 87,650 | 96.85% | 81,565 | 97.32% | 77,630 | 98.65% | 71,805 | 98.36% |
| Total population | 99,863 | 100% | 90,504 | 100% | 83,810 | 100% | 78,692 | 100% | 73,000 | 100% |
Note: Totals greater than 100% due to multiple origin responses

=== Language ===
Nanaimo's population is predominantly Anglophone. As of the 2021 census, 86.7% of residents claimed English as their mother tongue. Other common first languages were Chinese (1.6%), French (1.2%) and Punjabi (1.2%).

Canada Census Mother Tongue - Nanaimo, British Columbia
| Census | Total | English | | | French | | | English & French | | | Other | | |
| Year | Responses | Count | Trend | Pop % | Count | Trend | Pop % | Count | Trend | Pop % | Count | Trend | Pop % |
| 2021 | 98,415 | 84,170 | ▲9.4% | 85.5% | 1,200 | ▲0.4% | 1.2% | 450 | ▲76.5% | 0.3% | 11,105 | ▲16.3% | 11.3% |
| 2016 | 88,705 | 76,930 | ▲5.9% | 86.7% | 1,195 | ▲2.1% | 1.3% | 255 | ▲21.4% | 0.3% | 9,545 | ▲17.6% | 10.8% |
| 2011 | 82,705 | 72,615 | ▲8.8% | 87.8% | 1,170 | ▼7.9% | 1.4% | 210 | ▲110.0% | 0.3% | 8,115 | ▼14.6% | 9.8% |
| 2006 | 77,630 | 66,760 | ▲6.1% | 86.0% | 1,270 | ▲21.5% | 1.6% | 100 | ▲17.6% | 0.1% | 9,500 | ▲22.3% | 12.2% |
| 2001 | 71,805 | 62,900 | ▲4.1% | 87.6% | 1,045 | ▼3.2% | 1.5% | 85 | ▼19.0% | 0.1% | 7,765 | ▲4.2% | 10.8% |
| 1996 | 69,495 | 60,415 | n/a | 86.9% | 1,080 | n/a | 1.6% | 105 | n/a | 0.2% | 7,455 | n/a | 10.7% |

=== Religion ===
Largest non-Christian religion in Nanaimo CMA by census tract based on the 2021 census

According to the 2021 census, religious groups in Nanaimo included:

- Irreligion (60,365 persons or 62.2%)
- Christianity (31,135 persons or 32.1%)
- Sikhism (1,330 persons or 1.4%)
- Islam (1,000 persons or 1.0%)
- Hinduism (785 persons or 0.8%)
- Buddhism (650 persons or 0.7%)
- Judaism (230 persons or 0.2%)
- Indigenous spirituality (170 persons or 0.2%)

Religious groups in the City of Nanaimo (1991−2021)
| Religious group | 2021 Canadian census | | 2011 Canadian census | | 2001 Canadian census | | 1991 Canadian census | |
| Religious group | Pop. | % | Pop. | % | Pop. | % | Pop. | % |
|---|---|---|---|---|---|---|---|---|
| Irreligion | 60,365 | 62.22% | 42,160 | 51.69% | 29,650 | 41.29% | 20,565 | 34.48% |
| Christianity | 31,135 | 32.09% | 36,425 | 44.66% | 39,415 | 54.89% | 37,450 | 62.79% |
| Sikhism | 1,330 | 1.37% | 880 | 1.08% | 945 | 1.32% | 1,145 | 1.92% |
| Islam | 1,000 | 1.03% | 250 | 0.31% | 110 | 0.15% | 30 | 0.05% |
| Hinduism | 785 | 0.81% | 275 | 0.34% | 115 | 0.16% | 100 | 0.17% |
| Buddhism | 650 | 0.67% | 495 | 0.61% | 730 | 1.02% | 120 | 0.2% |
| Judaism | 230 | 0.24% | 65 | 0.08% | 165 | 0.23% | 55 | 0.09% |
| Indigenous spirituality | 170 | 0.18% | 110 | 0.13% | 155 | 0.22% | —N/a | —N/a |
| Other | 1,355 | 1.4% | 900 | 1.1% | 540 | 0.75% | 175 | 0.29% |
| Total responses | 97,020 | 97.15% | 81,565 | 97.32% | 71,805 | 98.36% | 59,640 | 99.19% |
| Total population | 99,863 | 100% | 83,810 | 100% | 73,000 | 100% | 60,129 | 100% |

== Economy ==
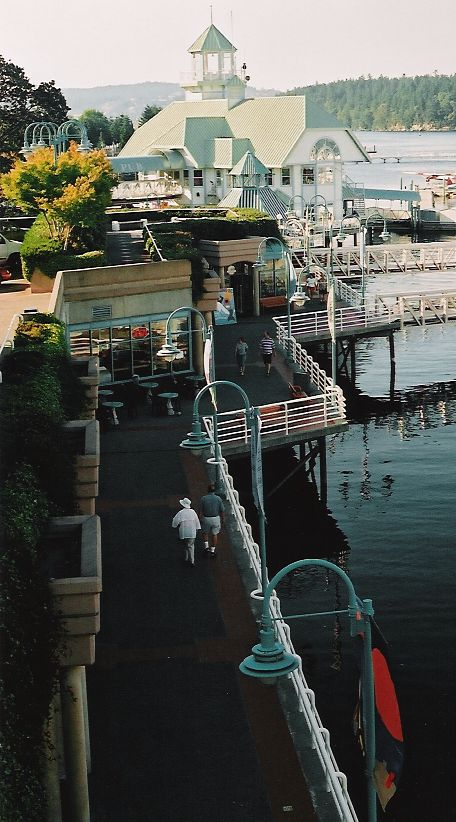
Nanaimo waterfront

The original economic driver was coal mining; however, the forestry industry supplanted it in the early 1960s with the building of the MacMillan Bloedel pulp mill at Harmac in 1958, named after Harvey MacMillan. Today the pulp mill is owned by the employees and local investors, injects well over half a million dollars a day into the local economy, and makes the entire area smell like sulphur multiple times a year. The largest employer is the provincial government. The service, retail and tourism industries are also big contributors to the local economy.

Technological development on Nanaimo has been growing with companies such as "Inuktun" and the establishment of government-funded Innovation Island as a site to help Nanaimo-based technological start-ups by giving them access to tools, education and venture capital.

== Media outlets ==
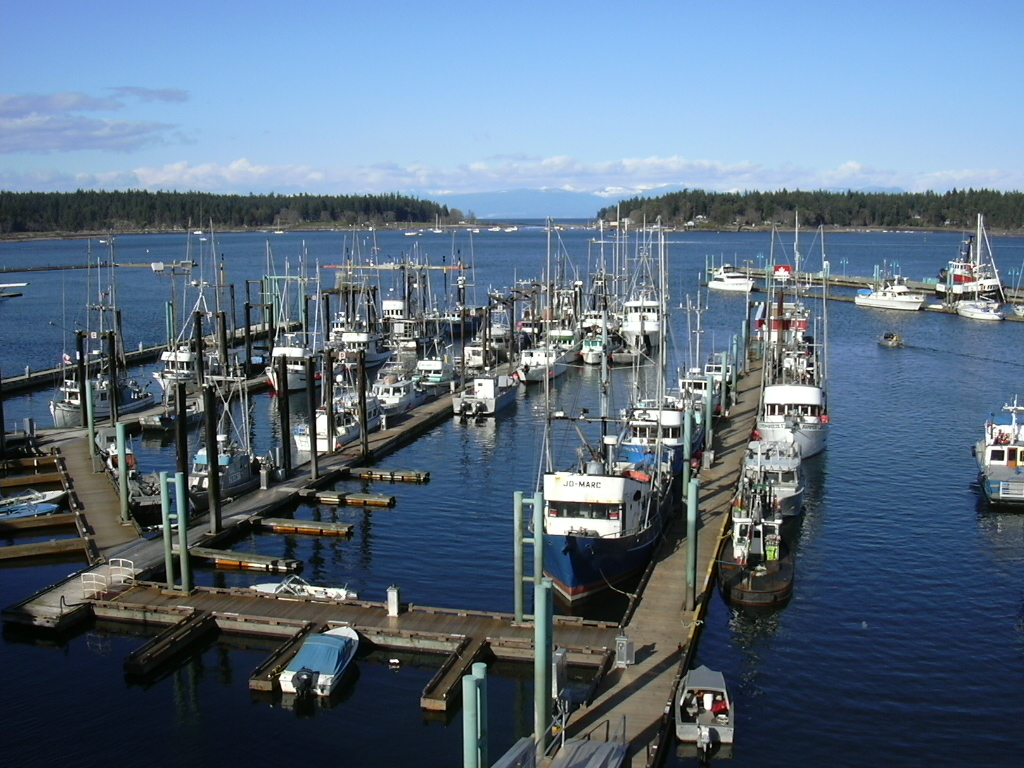
Nanaimo Harbour

Nanaimo is served by one newspaper: the Nanaimo News Bulletin (33,000 copies twice a week—audited), which is owned by Black Press. The Harbour City Star, also owned by publisher Black Press, was closed in 2016. On 29 January 2016, the 141-year-old Nanaimo Daily News, shut down. Nanaimo also hosts a bureau for CIVI-DT (CTV 2 Victoria, cable channel 12) and a satellite office for CHEK-DT (Independent, cable channel 6).

Nanaimo is also served by the Jim Pattison Group's CHWF-FM (The Wolf) and CKWV-FM (The Wave), as well as CHLY-FM, an independent community campus radio station and Vista Radio's CKAY-FM (ICON Radio). CBC Radio One is heard over CBU from Vancouver, with CBU-FM (CBC Music) and CBCV-FM available as HD Radio signals.

== Politics ==
=== Federal ===
In the House of Commons of Canada, Nanaimo is represented by Tamara Kronis of the Conservative Party of Canada, representing the riding of Nanaimo—Ladysmith since the 2025 election. The city was split into two separate ridings, Nanaimo—Cowichan (Jean Crowder, New Democratic Party), which included South Nanaimo and Cassidy, and Nanaimo—Alberni (James Lunney, Independent elected as a Conservative), which included North Nanaimo and Lantzville, until the 2012 federal electoral redistribution.

Nanaimo federal election results
| Year | Liberal | | Conservative | | New Democratic | | Green | |
|---|---|---|---|---|---|---|---|---|
| 2025 | 28% | 20,656 | 35% | 26,381 | 18% | 13,586 | 18% | 13,485 |
| 2021 | 14% | 6,990 | 26% | 12,908 | 29% | 14,373 | 25% | 12,095 |
| 2019 | 14% | 7,219 | 26% | 13,056 | 22% | 12,004 | 35% | 17,685 |

=== Provincial ===
In the Legislative Assembly of British Columbia, Nanaimo is represented by the ridings of Nanaimo-Lantzville (George Anderson, BC NDP) and Nanaimo-Gabriola Island (Sheila Malcolmson, BC NDP).

Leonard Krog resigned in 2018 to accept the position of Mayor of Nanaimo. In response, Sheila Malcolmson resigned from federal politics and successfully ran for the vacated position. She was re-elected in the 2024 British Columbia general election.

Nanaimo provincial election results
| Year | New Democratic | | Liberal | | Green | |
|---|---|---|---|---|---|---|
| 2020 | 52% | 20,726 | 24% | 9,507 | 23% | 9,172 |
| 2017 | 44% | 19,034 | 34% | 14,747 | 20% | 8,707 |

=== Civic ===
The mayor of Nanaimo is currently Leonard Krog, who replaced Bill Mackay in 2018.

Mark Bate became Nanaimo's first mayor in 1875. He served an additional 15 one-year terms as mayor (1875–1879, 1881–1886, 1888–1889, and 1898–1900).

The most well-known mayor Nanaimo ever had was Frank J. Ney, who instigated Nanaimo's well-known bathtub races, which he regularly attended dressed as a pirate. There is a statue to commemorate Ney—dressed in his pirate costume—at Swy-a-Lana Lagoon, which is on the Nanaimo waterfront. Ney was also an MLA for the Social Credit party while he was mayor. An elementary school has been named in his honour.

=== Open government ===
The city's planning department has steadily produced enough municipal data to warrant a Time magazine article on open government. Nanaimo has been dubbed "the capital of Google Earth". Working directly with Google, the city fed it a wealth of information about its buildings, property lines, utilities and streets. The result is earth.nanaimo.ca, a wealth of city data viewed through the Google Earth 3D mapping program. Their Open Data Catalogue is available at data.nanaimo.ca.

== Education ==
Nanaimo has over 30 elementary and secondary schools, most of which are public and are operated by School District 68 Nanaimo-Ladysmith.

Aspengrove School is a junior kindergarten to grade 12 independent (private) school accredited as an International Baccalaureate World School and offers the IB Primary Years, IB Middle Years and IB Diploma programme and received a 10 out of 10 by the IB Organization (IBO) in 2011.

The Conseil scolaire francophone de la Colombie-Britannique operates two Francophone schools, École Océane primary school and the École secondaire de Nanaimo.

The main campus of Vancouver Island University is located in Nanaimo, which brings many international students, mostly East Asian, to the city.

== Pacific Biological Station ==
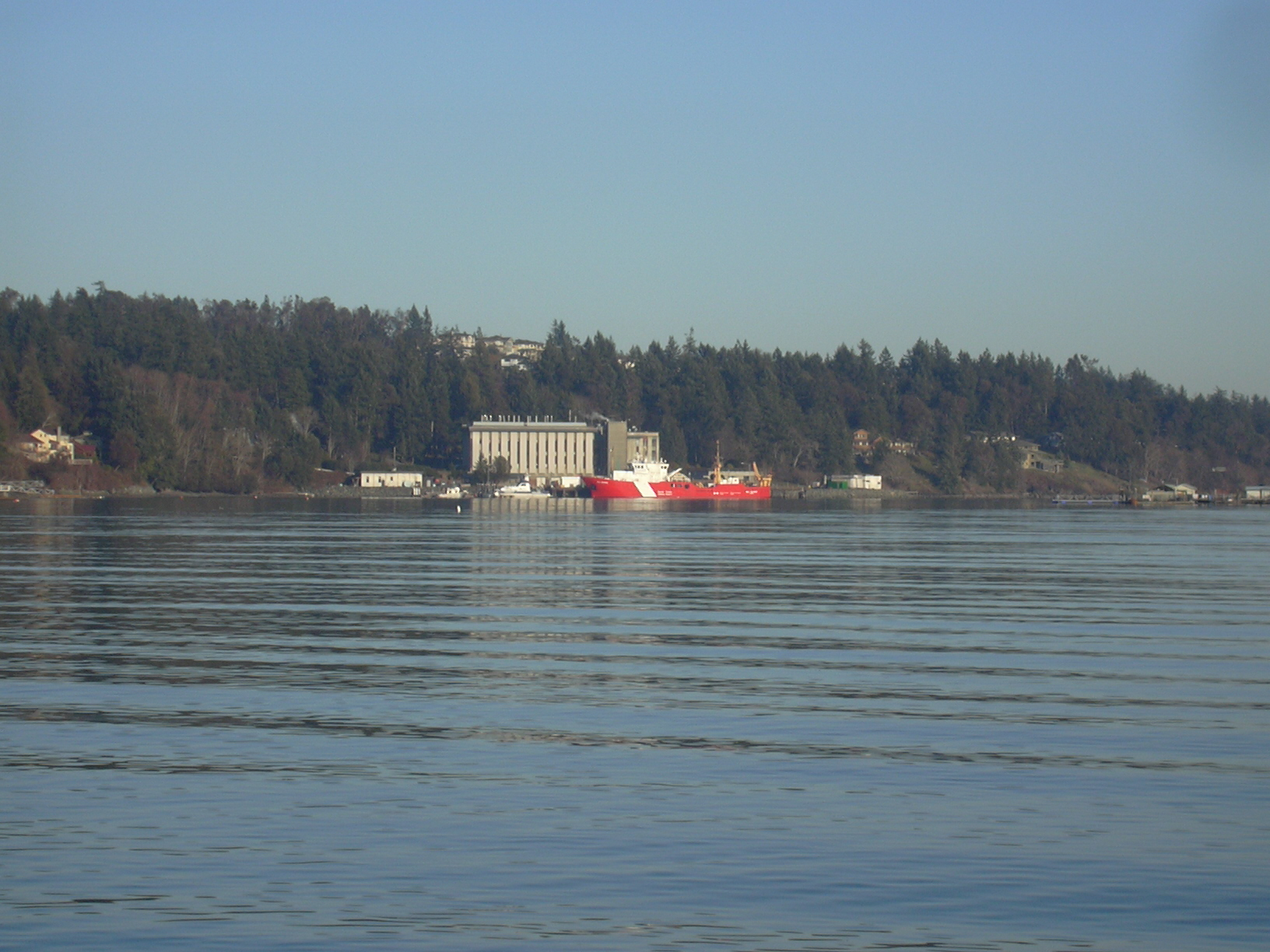
View of the Pacific Biological Station from Departure Bay Beach c. 2003

The Pacific Biological Station, located on the north shore of Departure Bay, was established in 1908. It is the oldest fisheries research centre on the Pacific coast. Operated by Fisheries and Oceans Canada, the station forms a network with eight other scientific facilities.

== Museums ==
The Nanaimo Art Gallery is a public art museum located downtown at 150 Commercial Street. In addition to contemporary exhibitions by local, national and international artists, the Gallery operates Art Lab which offers year-round art-based programs for learners of all ages. The Gallery also holds a collection of artwork, operates The Gallery Store, which features work by local artists and artisans, and runs Artists in the Schools, a program that operates across three school districts.

The Nanaimo Museum is a public historical museum located downtown on the traditional territory of the Snuneymuxw First Nation at 100 Museum Way.

The Vancouver Island Military Museum is a public military historical museum located at 100 Cameron Road.

== Arts and culture ==
The Port Theatre in downtown Nanaimo hosts many performers and shows during the year.

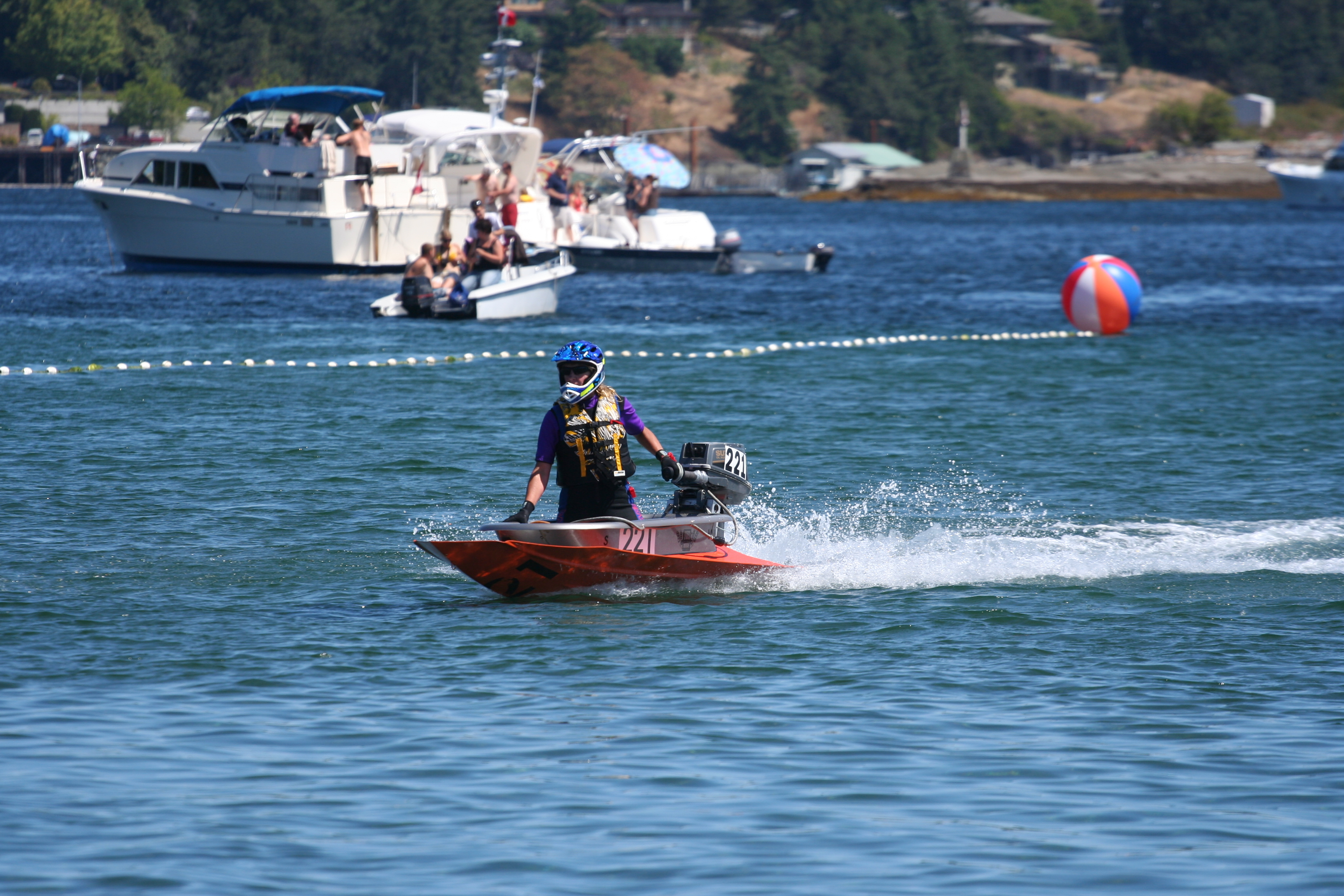
Bathtub racing in Nanaimo

The Nanaimo bar, which is a no-bake cookie bar with custard filling, is a Canadian dessert named after Nanaimo.

Nanaimo hosts the annual Nanaimo Marine Festival. Part of the festival includes the bathtub race. The race starts in the Nanaimo Harbour downtown, goes around Entrance Island, northwest to Winchelsea Islands by Nanoose Bay and finish in Departure Bay back in Nanaimo. Until the 1990s the race alternated between racing from Nanaimo to Vancouver and from Vancouver to Nanaimo.

== Sports and recreation ==
- The Nanaimo United Football Club (NUFC). With over 1,700 members, it is the largest sports club on Vancouver Island, and is one of the oldest sports clubs in Canada, having been formed in 1903.
- The Canadian Junior Football League's Vancouver Island Raiders, who play at Caledonia Park.
- The British Columbia Hockey League's Nanaimo Clippers and the Western Lacrosse Association's Nanaimo Timbermen, both of which play at the Frank Crane Arena.
- The Nanaimo Buccaneers of the Vancouver Island Junior Hockey League, play at the Nanaimo Ice Centre.
- The Nanaimo NightOwls, of the West Coast League, play at Serauxmen Stadium.
- Football Nanaimo plays at Pioneer Park.
- The Nanaimo Hornets Rugby Football Club, part of the British Columbia Rugby Union. Established in 1888 it is the second oldest rugby club in Western Canada. Their home ground and club is situated in Pioneer Park (since 1968).
- Nanaimo is home to North America's first legal, purpose-made bungee jumping bridge, operated by WildPlay Element Parks.

== Notable people ==
- Iain Baird, professional soccer player
- Terry Beech, politician
- Red Carr, professional ice hockey player
- Gene Carr, professional ice hockey player
- Justin Chatwin, actor
- Glen Clark, 31st Premier of British Columbia
- Jimmy Claxton, baseball pitcher who broke US baseball's racial colour barrier
- Raymond Collishaw, Canadian World War I flying ace
- Allison Crowe, singer-songwriter and pianist
- John DeSantis, actor
- Michael Edgson, swimmer
- Jodelle Ferland, actress
- David Gogo, blues guitarist
- Paul Gogo, keyboardist for the rock band Trooper
- Christopher Hart, actor and magician
- Al Hill (born 1955), ice hockey player and scout
- Bob Hindmarch, professor and ice hockey coach
- Constance Isherwood, lawyer
- Christine Jensen, Composer and conductor
- Ingrid Jensen, jazz trumpeter
- Susan Juby (born 1969), author
- Ethan Katzberg (born 2002), athlete, Olympic gold medal, 2023 Hammer throw world champion
- Diana Krall, jazz pianist and vocalist
- Tim Lander, poet
- Marc-André Leclerc, alpinist
- Callum Montgomery (born 1997), professional soccer player
- Susan Morgan (born 1949), Oregon politician
- Tyson "TenZ" Ngo, former professional e-sports player and online streamer
- Phil Olsen, Olympian javelin
- Steve Smith, professional downhill mountain biker
- Shane Sutcliffe (born 1975), boxer
- Kirsten Sweetland, triathlete
- May Tully, vaudeville actress, writer, director
- Lorna Vinden, wheelchair athlete
- Cameron Whitcomb, singer and songwriter
- Lidice Megla, Cuban-Canadian poet, writer, and literary translator
- Layla Zoe, blues and blues rock musician and songwriter

== Sister city ==
Nanaimo has one sister city:

- Saitama (←Iwatsuki City), Saitama Prefecture, Japan, since 1996

== See also ==
- 1887 Nanaimo mine explosion
