= 31st Parliament of British Columbia =

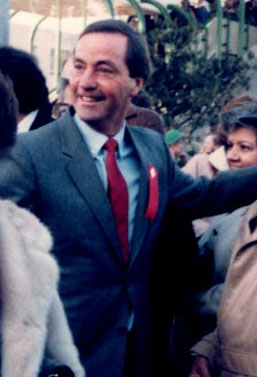
The Social Credit Party led by Bill Bennett (pictured) formed the government

The 31st Legislative Assembly of British Columbia sat from 1976 to 1979. The members were elected in the British Columbia general election held in December 1975. The Social Credit Party led by Bill Bennett formed the government. The New Democratic Party (NDP) led by William Stewart King formed the official opposition. Dave Barrett had lost his seat in the election; he was reelected in a by-election held in June 1976 and resumed his role as party leader.

Dean Smith served as speaker for the assembly until 1978 when he resigned as speaker. Harvey Schroeder replaced Smith as speaker in 1979.

== Members of the 31st Parliament ==
The following members were elected to the assembly in 1975:

Member	Electoral district	Party	First elected / previously elected	No.# of term(s)
Robert Evans Skelly	Alberni	NDP	1972	2nd term
Frank Arthur Calder	Atlin	Social Credit (Note: First elected as a CCF)	1949, 1960	9th term*
James J. (Jim) Hewitt	Boundary-Similkameen	Social Credit	1975	1st term
Raymond L. Loewen	Burnaby-Edmonds	Social Credit	1975	1st term
Eileen Dailly	Burnaby North	NDP	1966	4th term
Elwood Neal Veitch	Burnaby-Willingdon	Social Credit	1975	1st term
Alexander Vaughan Fraser	Cariboo	Social Credit	1969	3rd term
Harvey Schroeder	Chilliwack	Social Credit	1972	2nd term
James Roland Chabot	Columbia River	Social Credit	1963	5th term
Karen Elizabeth Sanford	Comox	NDP	1972	2nd term
George Herman Kerster	Coquitlam	Social Credit	1975	1st term
Barbara Brookman Wallace	Cowichan-Malahat	NDP	1975	1st term
Kenneth Walter Davidson	Delta	Social Credit	1975	1st term
George Mussallem	Dewdney	Social Credit	1966, 1975	3rd term*
Lyle Benjamin James Kahl	Esquimalt	Social Credit	1975	1st term
Howard John Lloyd	Fort George	Social Credit	1975	1st term
Rafe Kenneth Mair	Kamloops	Social Credit	1975	1st term
George Wayne Haddad	Kootenay	Social Credit	1975	1st term
Robert Howard McClelland	Langley	Social Credit	1972	2nd term
Don Lockstead	Mackenzie	NDP	1972	2nd term
David Daniel Stupich	Nanaimo	NDP	1963, 1972	4th term*
Lorne Nicolson	Nelson-Creston	NDP	1972	2nd term
Dennis Geoffrey Cocke	New Westminster	NDP	1969	3rd term
Patricia Jordan	North Okanagan	Social Credit	1966	4th term
Dean Edward Smith	North Peace River	Social Credit	1966	4th term
Gordon Fulerton Gibson	North Vancouver-Capilano	Liberal	1974	2nd term
John (Jack) Davis	North Vancouver-Seymour	Social Credit	1975	1st term
George Scott Wallace	Oak Bay	Progressive Conservative	1969 (Note: First elected as a Social Credit candidate)	3rd term
Victor Albert Stephens (1978)	Oak Bay	Progressive Conservative	1978	1st term
Jack Joseph Kempf	Omineca	Social Credit	1975	1st term
Graham Lea	Prince Rupert	NDP	1972	2nd term
William Stewart King	Revelstoke-Slocan	NDP	1968, 1972	3rd term*
James Arthur Nielsen	Richmond	Social Credit	1975	1st term
Christopher D'Arcy	Rossland-Trail	NDP	1972	2nd term
Hugh Austin Curtis	Saanich and the Islands	Social Credit (Note: First elected as a Progressive Conservative)	1972	2nd term
Leonard Bawtree	Shuswap	Social Credit	1975	1st term
Cyril Morley Shelford	Skeena	Social Credit	1952, (Note: Omineca) 1975	8th term*
William Richards Bennett	South Okanagan	Social Credit	1973	2nd term
Donald McGray Phillips	South Peace River	Social Credit	1966, 1972	3rd term*
William Nick (Bill) Vander Zalm	Surrey	Social Credit	1975	1st term
Rosemary Brown	Vancouver-Burrard	NDP	1972	2nd term
Norman Levi	Vancouver-Burrard	NDP	1968, (Note: Vancouver South) 1972	3rd term*
Emery Oakland Barnes	Vancouver Centre	NDP	1972	2nd term
Gary Lauk	Vancouver Centre	NDP	1972	2nd term
Alexander Barrett MacDonald	Vancouver East	NDP	1960	6th term
Robert Arthur Williams	Vancouver East	NDP	1966	4th term
David Barrett (1976)	Vancouver East	NDP	1960, (Note: Dewdney) 1976	6th term*
Grace Mary McCarthy	Vancouver-Little Mountain	Social Credit	1966, 1975	3rd term*
Evan Maurice Wolfe	Vancouver-Little Mountain	Social Credit	1966, (Note: Vancouver Centre) 1975	3rd term*
Garde Basil Gardom	Vancouver-Point Grey	Social Credit	1966 (Note: First elected as a Liberal)	4th term
Patrick Lucey McGeer	Vancouver-Point Grey	Social Credit	1962	6th term
Charles Stephen Rogers	Vancouver South	Social Credit	1975	1st term
William Gerald Strongman	Vancouver South	Social Credit	1975	1st term
Charles Frederick Barber	Victoria	NDP	1975	1st term
Robert Samuel Bawlf	Victoria	Social Credit	1975	1st term
Louis Allan Williams	West Vancouver-Howe Sound	Social Credit	1966	4th term
Thomas Manville Waterland	Yale-Lillooet	Social Credit	1975	1st term

== Party standings ==
Affiliation	Members
Social Credit	35
New Democratic Party	18
Liberal	1
Progressive Conservative	1
Total	55
Government Majority	15

== By-elections ==
By-elections were held to replace members for various reasons:

Electoral district	Member elected	Party	Election date	Reason
Vancouver East	David Barrett	NDP	June 3, 1976	R.A. Williams resigned February 27, 1976, to provide seat for D. Barrett
Oak Bay	Victor Albert Stephens	Progressive Conservative	March 20, 1978	G.S. Wallace resigned December 31, 1977, to return to medical practice

Notes

- Two by-elections were called in 1979 for the ridings of North Vancouver-Seymour and North Vancouver-Capilano but they were cancelled when a 1979 general election was scheduled.
