= Columbia River (electoral district) =

Defunct provincial electoral district in British Columbia, Canada

Columbia River was a provincial electoral district in the Canadian province of British Columbia from 1966 to 1986. The riding's predecessor, which was named Columbia, appeared on the hustings from 1903 to 1963. The successor riding in this region is the current Columbia River-Revelstoke riding.

== Members of Legislative Assembly ==
Columbia River
Assembly	Years	Member	Party
Riding created from Columbia
28th	1966–1969	James Chabot	Social Credit
29th	1969–1972	James Chabot	Social Credit
30th	1972–1975	James Chabot	Social Credit
31st	1975–1979	James Chabot	Social Credit
32nd	1979–1983	James Chabot	Social Credit
33rd	1983–1986	James Chabot	Social Credit
34th	1986–1991	Duane Crandall	Social Credit
Riding dissolved into Columbia River-Revelstoke

== Electoral history ==
Note: Winners in each election are in bold.

28th British Columbia election, 1966
Party	Candidate	Votes	%	±	Expenditures
Social Credit	**James Roland Chabot**	**1,563**	**58.45%**	–	unknown
Liberal	Robert Keenleyside	634	23.71%	–	unknown
New Democratic	Chris Madson	477	17.84%		unknown
Total valid votes		2,674	100.00%		
Total rejected ballots		21			
Turnout		%			

29th British Columbia election, 1969
Party	Candidate	Votes	%	±	Expenditures
Liberal	William Richard Batten	726	22.47%	–	unknown
Social Credit	**James Roland Chabot**	**1,818**	**56.27%**	–	unknown
New Democrat	Ian David Jack	687	21.26%		unknown
Total valid votes		3,231	100.00%		
Total rejected ballots		26			
Turnout		%			

30th British Columbia election, 1972
Party	Candidate	Votes	%	±	Expenditures
Social Credit	**James Roland Chabot**	**1,814**	**45.35%**	–	unknown
New Democratic	Thomas Hutchison	1,573	39.33%		unknown
Liberal	Stanley Lim	190	4.75%	–	unknown
Progressive Conservative	Michael Joseph Walsh	423	10.58%		unknown
Total valid votes		4,000	100.00%		
Total rejected ballots		58			
Turnout		%			

31st British Columbia election, 1975
Party	Candidate	Votes	%	±	Expenditures
Social Credit	**James Roland Chabot**	**2,800**	**59.93%**	–	unknown
Liberal	Joseph Hadley Conroy	507	10.85%	–	unknown
New Democratic	Orlando Pecora	1,365	29.22%		unknown
Total valid votes		4,672	100.00%		
Total rejected ballots		70			
Turnout		%			

32nd British Columbia election, 1979
Party	Candidate	Votes	%	±	Expenditures
Social Credit	**James Roland Chabot**	**4,830**	**52.21%**	–	unknown
New Democratic	Sandra Helen Mary Smaill	4,421	47.79%		unknown
Total valid votes		9,251	100.00%		
Total rejected ballots		157			
Turnout		%			

33rd British Columbia election, 1983
Party	Candidate	Votes	%	±	Expenditures
Social Credit	**James Roland Chabot**	**6,385**	**53.94%**	–	unknown
New Democratic	Don Duff	5,232	44.20%		unknown
Liberal	Michael Gordon Hendren	220	1.86%	–	unknown
Total valid votes		11,837	100.00%		
Total rejected ballots		159			
Turnout		%			

34th British Columbia election, 1986
Party	Candidate	Votes	%	±	Expenditures
Liberal	Betty A.B. Aitchison	672	6.36%	–	unknown
Social Credit	**Duane Delton Crandall**	**5,178**	**48.98%**	–	unknown
New Democratic	Ralph Jones	4,722	44.66%		unknown
Total valid votes		10,572	100.00%		
Total rejected ballots		127			
Turnout		%			

After the 1986 election, the riding was merged with part of the Shuswap-Revelstoke riding to form Columbia River-Revelstoke, which is the current riding for this region.

== See also ==
- List of British Columbia provincial electoral districts
- Canadian provincial electoral districts
