= West Vancouver-Howe Sound =

Defunct provincial electoral district in British Columbia, Canada

West Vancouver-Howe Sound was a provincial electoral district of British Columbia, Canada, from 1966 to 1986. The riding's predecessor was North Vancouver, which first appeared on the hustings from 1903.

== Electoral history ==
28th British Columbia election, 1966
Party	Candidate	Votes	%	±	Expenditures
Liberal	Louis Allan Williams	8,346	52.76%		unknown
Social Credit	Laurence Smith Eckhardt	5,499	34.76%	–	unknown
New Democratic	James William C. McKenzie	1,975	12.48%		unknown
Total valid votes		15,820	100.00%		
Total rejected ballots		171			
Turnout		%			

29th British Columbia election, 1969
Party	Candidate	Votes	%	±	Expenditures
Liberal	Louis Allan Williams	8,974	46.39%		unknown
Social Credit	Leonard Joseph Corcoran	7,433	22.47%	–	unknown
New Democrat	William Basil Mundy	2,939	15.19%		unknown
Total valid votes		19,346	100.00%		
Total rejected ballots		131			
Turnout		%			

30th British Columbia election, 1972
Party	Candidate	Votes	%	±	Expenditures
Liberal	Louis Allan Williams	7,597	33.93%		unknown
Progressive Conservative	Peter Stewart Hyndman	7,076	31.60%		unknown
Social Credit	Louis Joseph Corcoran	5,098	22.77%	–	unknown
New Democratic	Raymond Alden Copes	2,619	11.70%		unknown
Total valid votes		22,390	100.00%		
Total rejected ballots		158			
Turnout		%			

31st British Columbia election, 1975
Party	Candidate	Votes	%	±	Expenditures
Social Credit	Louis Allan Williams	16,173	64.40%	–	unknown
New Democratic	Murray Wayne Miller	4,647	18.50%		unknown
Liberal	Cordelia Kitty Maracle	3,263	12.99%		unknown
Progressive Conservative	Francis Bernard Jameson	998	3.97%		unknown
League for Socialist Action	Joseph Kellner	34	0.14%		
Total valid votes		25,115	100.00%		
Total rejected ballots		261			
Turnout		%			

32nd British Columbia election, 1979
Party	Candidate	Votes	%	±	Expenditures
Social Credit	Louis Allan Williams	16,566	67.94%	–	unknown
New Democratic	Lawrence Charles Minchin	5,773	23.68%		unknown
Progressive Conservative	Christopher Derrick England	1,916	7.86%		unknown
Gay Alliance Toward Equality	Robert Douglas Cook	126	0.52%		
Total valid votes		24,381	100.00%		
Total rejected ballots		459			
Turnout		%			

33rd British Columbia election, 1983
Party	Candidate	Votes	%	±	Expenditures
Social Credit	John Reynolds	17,218	61.35%	–	unknown
New Democratic	Claus Frank Spiekerman	6,766	24.11%		unknown
Liberal	Morton Alexander Graham	1,941	6.92%		unknown
Progressive Conservative	Neil Stewart Thompson	1,824	6.50%		unknown
Independents	James Roland Chabot	316	1.12%		
Total valid votes		28,065	100.00%		
Total rejected ballots		234			
Turnout		%			

34th British Columbia election, 1986
Party	Candidate	Votes	%	±	Expenditures
Social Credit	John Reynolds	14,591	54.31%	–	unknown
Liberal	Ed Carlin	6,786	25.26%		unknown
New Democratic	David C. Manning	5,490	20.43%		unknown
Total valid votes		26,867	100.00%		
Total rejected ballots		265			
Turnout		%			

== See also ==
- List of British Columbia provincial electoral districts
- Canadian provincial electoral districts
- Vancouver (electoral districts)
