= Revelstoke-Slocan =

Defunct provincial electoral district in British Columbia, Canada

Revelstoke-Slocan was a provincial electoral district of British Columbia, Canada, from 1966 to 1986. The riding was formed from a merger of the Revelstoke riding with the Kaslo-Slocan riding. The successor riding in this region is the current Columbia River-Revelstoke riding.

== Notable MLAs ==
William Stewart King served as Minister of Labour in the 1972 NDP government.

== Electoral history ==
The riding was redistributed after the 1975 election. In 1979 the area was in the Shuswap-Revelstoke riding while the Slocan area became represented by Nelson-Creston.

Note: Winners in each election are in bold.

28th British Columbia election, 1966
Party	Candidate	Votes	%	±	Expenditures
Social Credit	Burton Peter Campbell	2,020	41.81%	–	unknown
Independent	David Roy Collier	105	2.17%		unknown
New Democratic	**Randolph Harding**	**2,158**	**44.67%**		unknown
Liberal	George Wilfred Laforme	548	11.34%		unknown
Total valid votes		4,831	100.00%		
Total rejected ballots		32			
Turnout		%			

29th British Columbia election, 1969
Party	Candidate	Votes	%	±	Expenditures
Social Credit	**Burton Peter Campbell**	**3,103**	**50.62%**	–	unknown
New Democrat	William Stewart King	2,611	42.59%		unknown
Liberal	Douglas Charles Stewart	416	6.79%		unknown
Total valid votes		6,130	100.00%		
Total rejected ballots		44			
Turnout		%			

30th British Columbia election, 1972
Party	Candidate	Votes	%	±	Expenditures
Social Credit	Burton Peter Campbell	2,580	37.55%	–	unknown
Progressive Conservative	Margaret Rose Illman	158	2.30%		unknown
New Democrat	William Stewart King	3,748	54.56%		unknown
Liberal	Bernard Charles Lavallee	384	5.59%		unknown
Total valid votes		6,870	100.00%		
Total rejected ballots		60			
Turnout		%			

31st British Columbia election, 1975
Party	Candidate	Votes	%	±	Expenditures
Liberal	Ronald Harvey Holoday	428	5.76%		unknown
**New Democrat**	**William Stewart King**	**3,988**	**53.68%**		unknown
Social Credit	Sam Olynyk	3,013	40.56%	–	unknown
Total valid votes		7,429	100.00%		
Total rejected ballots		99			
Turnout		%			

== See also ==
- List of British Columbia provincial electoral districts
- Canadian provincial electoral districts
- List of electoral districts in the Okanagan
- List of electoral districts in the Kootenays
