= Allan Williams (politician) =

Canadian politician (1922–2011)

Allan Williams QC

Member of the British Columbia Legislative Assembly for West Vancouver-Howe Sound
- In office September 12, 1966 – April 7, 1983
- Preceded by: Riding established
- Succeeded by: John Reynolds

Attorney General of British Columbia
- In office November 24, 1979 – May 26, 1983
- Premier: Bill Bennett
- Preceded by: Garde Gardom
- Succeeded by: Brian Smith

Minister of Labour of British Columbia
- In office December 22, 1975 – November 24, 1979
- Premier: Bill Bennett
- Preceded by: William King
- Succeeded by: Jack Heinrich

Personal details
- Born: May 22, 1922 Glenavon, Saskatchewan, Canada
- Died: February 28, 2011 (aged 88) Vancouver, British Columbia, Canada
- Party: BC Liberal (1966-1975); Independent (1975); BC Social Credit (1975-1983)
- Spouse: Marjorie Lake (m. 1948)
- Education: University of British Columbia
- Profession: lawyer

Military service
- Allegiance: Canada
- Branch/service: Royal Canadian Air Force
- Years of service: 1941–1946

Louis Allan Williams (May 22, 1922 – February 28, 2011) was a Canadian lawyer and politician who represented the electoral district of West Vancouver-Howe Sound in the Legislative Assembly of British Columbia from 1966 to 1983. Initially part of the British Columbia Liberal Party caucus, he joined the Social Credit Party (Socred) in 1975, and served as labour minister and Attorney General under Premier Bill Bennett.

== Biography ==
Born in Glenavon, Saskatchewan, Williams grew up in Assiniboia before moving with his parents to Vancouver, British Columbia, in 1936. Following the outbreak of World War II, he enlisted in the Royal Canadian Air Force in 1941, and underwent training as a pilot before serving as flying instructor. After being discharged in 1946, he studied law at the University of British Columbia, and was called to the British Columbia bar in 1950. A resident of West Vancouver since 1949, he served six years on the municipality's Parks and Recreation Commission, and was elected to the West Vancouver municipal council in 1965.

He contested the 1966 provincial election as a Liberal candidate, and was elected member of the Legislative Assembly (MLA) for the new riding of West Vancouver-Howe Sound; he was re-elected there in 1969 and 1972. Amidst disagreements over whether the Liberals should form a coalition with the Social Credit Party in opposition to the ruling New Democrats, Williams left the party in May 1975 to serve as an independent member, then joined the Socreds that September alongside former Liberal MLAs Garde Gardom and Pat McGeer.

The Socreds returned to power in the December 1975 election, and the re-elected Williams was named by Premier Bill Bennett as labour minister; he was also given responsibility for native affairs. Following his re-election in 1979, he initially retained the labour portfolio before becoming Attorney General that November, and served in that role for the remainder of his term as MLA.

He declined to run for re-election in 1983. After leaving provincial politics, he returned to the practice of law, then served again on the West Vancouver council from 1993 to 2002.

He married Marjorie Lake in 1948; they had two daughters and a son together. He died on February 28, 2011, following a long illness.
