= George Scott Wallace =

Canadian politician (1929–2011)

Member of the British Columbia Legislative Assembly for Oak Bay
- In office August 27, 1969 – December 31, 1977
- Preceded by: Alan Brock MacFarlane
- Succeeded by: Victor Stephens

Alderman on the Oak Bay Municipal Council
- In office 1967–1969

Personal details
- Born: August 9, 1929 Leven, Fife, Scotland
- Died: October 15, 2011 (aged 82) Victoria, British Columbia, Canada
- Party: BC Conservative (1971–2011)
- Other political affiliations: Conservative (federal); Social Credit (before 1971)
- Education: University of Edinburgh Medical School

George Scott Wallace (August 9, 1929 – October 15, 2011) was a Scottish-Canadian politician and physician who served as a member of the Legislative Assembly of British Columbia (MLA) representing the electoral district of Oak Bay from 1969 to 1977.

== Early career and education ==
Wallace was born in Leven, Fife, Scotland, and attended the University of Edinburgh Medical School from 1947 to 1952. He came to Canada in 1957 and opened a general practice in Victoria in 1961.

== Political career ==
Wallace served as an alderman on the Oak Bay Municipal Council from 1967 to 1969.

In the 1969 general election, Wallace ran as the Social Credit candidate in the electoral district of Oak Bay, winning with 52.13% of the vote.

Wallace crossed the floor to join the Conservative Party of British Columbia in 1971 and was re-elected as in the 1972 general election. He was elected leader of the party in 1973, after the previous party leader failed to win a seat, and led it through the 1975 general election in which he was the only Conservative MLA to win a seat. He stepped down as party leader in July 1977 and retired from the legislature on December 31, 1977 in order to return to his medical practice.

== Later years and death ==
In 1993, he announced that he was willing to help terminally ill Sue Rodriguez end her life if the courts rejected her attempt to challenge the law banning assisted suicide. He subsequently served as medical advisor to the Right to Die Society. Rodriguez died in February 1994 with the assistance of an anonymous physician.

Wallace died at the age of 82, in Victoria.
