= Shuswap-Revelstoke =

Defunct provincial electoral district in British Columbia, Canada

Shuswap-Revelstoke was a provincial electoral district of British Columbia, Canada, from 1979 to 1991. The riding was formed by merging the northern portions of the Revelstoke-Slocan riding with the Shuswap riding. The successor riding for the Revelstoke area is the current Columbia River-Revelstoke riding.

== Electoral history ==
32nd British Columbia election, 1979
Party	Candidate	Votes	%	±	Expenditures
New Democratic	William Stewart King	10,654	47.95%		unknown
Social Credit	Leonard Bawtree	10,008	45.04%	–	unknown
Progressive Conservative	Harold A. Smiley	1,557	7.01%		unknown
Total valid votes		22,219	100.00%		
Total rejected ballots		293			
Turnout		%			

33rd British Columbia election, 1983
Party	Candidate	Votes	%	±	Expenditures
Social Credit	Cliff Michael	14,102	52.07%	–	unknown
New Democrat	William Stewart King	12,340	45.56%		unknown
Liberal	Basil Edward Studer	642	2.37%		unknown
Total valid votes		27,084	100.00%		
Total rejected ballots		320			
Turnout		%			

34th British Columbia election, 1986
Party	Candidate	Votes	%	±	Expenditures
Social Credit	Cliff Michael	12,302	50.72%	–	unknown
New Democrat	Gordon S. Priestman	10,768	44.40		unknown
Liberal	Basil Edward Studer	786	3.24%		unknown
Green	Constance Katherine (Connie) Harris	397	1.64%	–	unknown
Total valid votes		24,253	100.00%		
Total rejected ballots		452			
Turnout		%			

Following the 1986 election the area was redistributed. The Shuswap area became the Shuswap riding while the Revelstoke area became part of Columbia River-Revelstoke.

== See also ==
- List of British Columbia provincial electoral districts
- Canadian provincial electoral districts
- List of electoral districts in the Okanagan
- List of electoral districts in the Kootenays
