= James Chabot Provincial Park =

Provincial park in British Columbia

- IUCN category Ia (strict nature reserve)
- Location within British Columbia
- Interactive map of James Chabot Provincial Park
- Location: Kootenay Land District, British Columbia, Canada
- Nearest city: Invermere, BC
- Coordinates: 50°30′43″N 116°01′29″W
- Area: 14 ha (35 acres)
- Established: March 1, 1979
- Governing body: BC Parks

James Chabot Provincial Park is a provincial park in British Columbia, Canada. Formerly Athalmer Beach Provincial Park, it is located in Invermere at the northeast end of Windermere Lake in the Columbia Valley region of the East Kootenay. Windermere Lake Provincial Park is located at the lake's southwestern end.

It is named for James Chabot, aka Jim Chabot, MLA for Columbia-Revelstoke from 1963 to 1986 and former Minister of Lands, Parks and Housing in the regime of Social Credit Premier W.A.C. Bennett.

== See also ==
- List of British Columbia provincial parks
