= Windermere Lake =

Windermere Lake or Lake Windermere may refer to:

- Windermere, the largest natural lake in England
- Windermere Lake (British Columbia), a popular recreational lake located on the Columbia River, Canada
  - Windermere Lake Provincial Park, British Columbia
- Windermere Lake (Ontario), a lake located in Ontario, Canada
- Lake Windermere (Illinois), reservoir, Coles County, Illinois, United States
- Lake Windermere (North Carolina), reservoir, Mecklenburg County, North Carolina, United States
- Lake Windermere (Tennessee), reservoir, Shelby County, Tennessee, United States

== See also ==
- Windermere (disambiguation)
