= William King (Canadian politician) =

Canadian politician (1930–2020)

Bill King
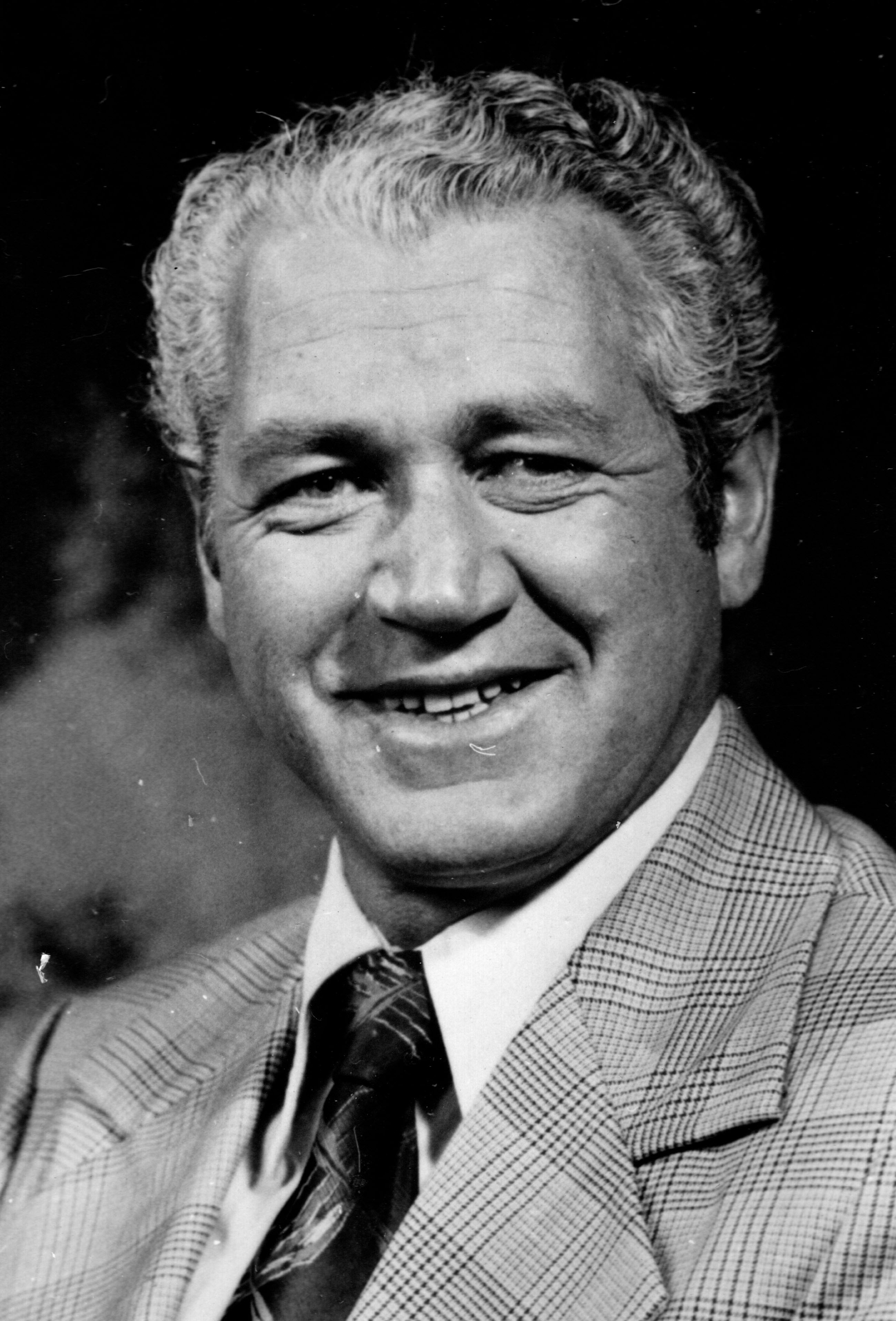

Leader of the Opposition of British Columbia
- In office March 17, 1976 – June 3, 1976
- Preceded by: Bill Bennett
- Succeeded by: Dave Barrett

Minister of Labour of British Columbia
- In office September 15, 1972 – December 22, 1975
- Premier: Dave Barrett
- Preceded by: James Chabot
- Succeeded by: Louis Allan Williams

Member of the Legislative Assembly for Shuswap-Revelstoke Revelstoke-Slocan (1968-1969, 1972-1979)
- In office August 30, 1972 – May 5, 1983
- Preceded by: Burton Peter Campbell
- Succeeded by: Cliff Michael
- In office July 15, 1968 – August 27, 1969
- Preceded by: Randolph Harding
- Succeeded by: Burton Peter Campbell

Personal details
- Born: William King; September 15, 1930 Tisdale, Saskatchewan
- Died: December 3, 2020 (aged 90)
- Party: New Democratic

William King (September 15, 1930 – December 3, 2020) was a former British Columbia (BC) politician from Revelstoke. King was a member of Dave Barrett's 1972 BC New Democratic Party provincial government, serving in the post of Minister of Labour.

== Early life and career ==
King was born in Tisdale, Saskatchewan, to Irish immigrants Patrick and Minnie King. He married Audrey Lennard on October 10, 1953, with whom he had two children, Linda and William Jr. He attended Nelson High School in Nelson, British Columbia, and the Labour College of Canada at the University of Montreal in 1967.

King entered politics as a teenager in 1943, when he acted as a runner between polling stations and the campaign headquarters of Herbert Herridge, CCF member of the Legislative Assembly (MLA) for Rossland-Trail. After moving to Revelstoke in 1952, he became an organizer for the CCF at the constituency level and worked on Vincent Segur's campaign in the 1952 provincial election. In 1960, King served as campaign manager for George Hobbs, who won the Revelstoke-Slocan seat for the CCF.

== Political life ==
King was first elected to the BC provincial legislature in the Revelstoke-Slocan constituency on July 15, 1968, in a by-election, but was defeated in the 1969 general election.

King was re-elected in 1972, when the New Democratic Party became the government. Premier Dave Barrett appointed King Minister of Labour. During his time as Minister of Labour, King introduced BC's first labour code and human rights legislation, which took jurisdiction over strikes and picketing away from courts, which tended to issue many ex parte injunctions against labour unions, and transferred it to a Labour Relations Board with broad powers. King was also the first to appoint women to key civil service positions in BC.

In the general election of 1975, NDP premier Dave Barrett lost his seat in the legislature. King served as leader of the Opposition until Barrett returned to the parliament upon winning a by-election in June 1976.

King was elected as the first MLA for the new riding of Shuswap-Revelstoke in the 1979 general election but was defeated in the 1983 British Columbia general election. He returned to his previous job at the Canadian Pacific Railway in Revelstoke for three years before retiring in 1986.
