= Oak Bay (electoral district) =

Defunct provincial electoral district in British Columbia, Canada

Oak Bay was a provincial electoral district in the Canadian province of British Columbia. It first appeared in the general election of 1941 and last appeared in the 1975 election. Its successor is the Oak Bay-Gordon Head riding. For other ridings in the area of Victoria, B.C. please see List of electoral districts in Greater Victoria.

== Demographics ==
Population, 1941 census	Population, 1976 census
Population Change, 1941–1976	
Area (km^{2})	
Pop. Density (people per km^{2})	

== Notable MLAs ==
Several British Columbia Conservative Party leaders have represented the riding including Herbert Anscomb who was Minister of Finance and Deputy Premier in the Liberal-Conservative coalition government. George Scott Wallace represented the district in the 1970s and his successor as Tory leader Victor Albert Stephens was its last MLA from 1978 until 1979.

== Electoral history ==
Note: Winners in each election are shown in bold.

20th British Columbia election, 1941
Party	Candidate	Votes	%	±	Expenditures
Conservative	**Herbert Anscomb**	**2,676**	**55.88%**		unknown
Liberal	Everett Stanley Farr	1,520	31.74%		unknown
Co-operative Commonwealth Fed.	Geoffrey LeGallais	593	12.38%		unknown
Total valid votes		4,789	100.00%		
Total rejected ballots		68			
Turnout		%			

21st British Columbia election, 1945
Party	Candidate	Votes	%	±	Expenditures
Coalition	**Herbert Anscomb**	**4,598**	**82.31%**	–	unknown
Co-operative Commonwealth Fed.	Clare Nulalinda McAllister	988	17.69%		unknown
Total valid votes		5,586	100.00%		
Total rejected ballots		40			
Turnout		%			

22nd British Columbia election, 1949
Party	Candidate	Votes	%	±	Expenditures
Coalition	**Herbert Anscomb**	**5,918**	**84.21%**	–	unknown
Co-operative Commonwealth	Patricia Mary Luchinsky	890	12.66%		unknown
Union of Electors	Claudius Edward Wright	220	3.13%		
Total valid votes		7,028	100.00%		
Total rejected ballots		183			
Turnout		%			

23rd British Columbia election, 1952^{1}
Party	Candidate	Votes 1st count	%	Votes final count	%	±%	
Social Credit League	Cecil George Alexander	1,071	12.98%	-	%		unknown
Progressive Conservative	Herbert Anscomb	2,843	34.45%	3,282	43.24%		unknown
Co-operative Commonwealth Fed.	Frederick James Bevis	707	8.57%	-	%		unknown
**Liberal**	**Philip Archibald Gibbs**	**3,631**	**44.00%**	**4,308**	**56.76%**		unknown
Total valid votes		8,252	%	7,590	100.00%		
Total rejected ballots		130					
Turnout		%					
^{1} Preferential ballot; 1st and final counts (of three) shown only.

24th British Columbia election, 1953 ^{2}
Party	Candidate	Votes 1st count	%	Votes final count	%	±%	
Co-operative Commonwealth Fed.	Frederick James Bevis	508	6.20%	-	%		unknown
Progressive Conservative	Deane Finlayson	1,220	14.90%	-	%		unknown
**Liberal**	**Philip Archibald Gibbs**	**3,182**	**38.85%**	**4,110**	**52.75%**		unknown
Social Credit League	Einar Maynard Gunderson	3,280	40.05 3%	3,681	47.25%		
Total valid votes		8,190	100.00%	7,791	%		
Total rejected ballots		192					
Total Registered Voters							
Turnout		%					
^{2} Preferential ballot; 1st and final counts (of three) shown only.

25th British Columbia election, 1956
Party	Candidate	Votes	%	±	Expenditures
**Liberal**	**Philip Archibald Gibbs**	**3,940**	**49.38%**		unknown
Progressive Conservative	Justin Victor Harbord	919	11.52%		unknown
Social Credit	Kenneth Oliver	2,691	33.73	–	unknown
Co-operative Commonwealth Fed.	Patrick Holman Thomas	429	5.38%		unknown
Total valid votes		7,979	100.00%		
Total rejected ballots		74			
Turnout		%			

26th British Columbia election, 1960
Party	Candidate	Votes	%	±	Expenditures
Progressive Conservative	James Arthur Anderson	1,212	11.82%		unknown
**Liberal**	**Alan Brock MacFarlane**	**4,558**	**44.46%**		unknown
Co-operative Commonwealth Fed.	Francis Harris Mitchell	701	6.84%		unknown
Social Credit	George Murdoch	3,780	36.87%	–	unknown
Total valid votes		10,251	100.00%		
Total rejected ballots		113			
Turnout		%			

27th British Columbia election, 1963
Party	Candidate	Votes	%	±	Expenditures
Social Credit	Charles McGregor Ennals	3,770	36.17%	–	unknown
New Democratic	Robert Wayne Harrigan	469	4.50%		unknown
Progressive Conservative	Hugh Larratt Henderson	1,726	16.56%		unknown
**Liberal**	**Alan Brock MacFarlane**	**4,457**	**42.77%**		unknown
Total valid votes		10,422	100.00%		
Total rejected ballots		72			
Turnout		%			

28th British Columbia election, 1966
Party	Candidate	Votes	%	±	Expenditures
Social Credit	Charles McGregor Ennals	5,808	38.97%	–	unknown
Liberal	**Alan Brock MacFarlane**	8,118	54.48%		unknown
New Democratic	Mira V. Yarwood	976	6.55%		unknown
Total valid votes		14,902	100.00%		
Total rejected ballots		184			
Turnout		%			

29th British Columbia election, 1969
Party	Candidate	Votes	%	±	Expenditures
Liberal	Allan Leslie Cox	6,656	36.37%		unknown
New Democratic	Kirby Gerald Seabrook	2,105	11.50%		unknown
Social Credit	**George Scott Wallace**	**9,542**	**52.13%**	–	unknown
Total valid votes		18,303	100.00%		
Total rejected ballots		174			
Turnout		%			

30th British Columbia election, 1972
Party	Candidate	Votes	%	±	Expenditures
Liberal	Mel Couvelier	3,253	16.47%		unknown
Social Credit	Howard Richmond McDiarmid	4,752	24.06%	–	unknown
New Democratic	John Gordon Neuls	1,423	7.21%		unknown
Progressive Conservative	**George Scott Wallace**	**10,319**	**52.06%**		unknown
Total valid votes		19,747	100.00%		
Total rejected ballots		229			
Turnout		%			

31st British Columbia election, 1975
Party	Candidate	Votes	%	±	Expenditures
Social Credit	Sherman Frank Byas Carson	8,274	37.29%	–	unknown
Liberal	Sarah Elizabeth Jameson	359	1.62%		unknown
New Democratic	Raymond Barrie Vickery	2,067	9.31%		unknown
Progressive Conservative	**George Scott Wallace**	**11,489**	**51.78%**		unknown
Total valid votes		22,189	100.00%		
Total rejected ballots		229			
Turnout		%			

By-election, March 20, 1978
Party	Candidate	Votes	%	±	Expenditures
Social Credit	Sherman Frank Byas Carson	5,109	28.52%	–	unknown
New Democratic	Bennett Allen Camp	3,498	19.58%	–	unknown
Liberal	Denson Graham Ross-Smith	2,350	13.12%		unknown
Progressive Conservative	**Victor Albert Stephens**	**6,904**	**38.54%**		unknown
Socialist	Lawrence Richard Tickner	54	00.3%	–	unknown
Total valid votes		17,915	100.00%		
Total rejected ballots		154			
Turnout		%			

The Oak Bay riding was redistributed and the new riding of Oak Bay-Gordon Head created. It first appeared in the general election of 1979.

== Sources ==
Elections BC Historical Returns
