= Philip Archibald Gibbs =

Canadian politician (1893–1960)

MLA for Oak Bay
- In office 1952–1960
- Preceded by: Herbert Anscomb
- Succeeded by: Alan Brock MacFarlane

Personal details
- Born: August 5, 1893 Llwynypia, Glamorgan, Wales
- Died: March 4, 1960 (aged 66) Victoria, British Columbia
- Party: British Columbia Liberal Party
- Spouse: Margaret Copeland Patterson (m.1920)
- Children: 3
- Occupation: accountant

Philip Archibald Gibbs (August 5, 1893 – March 4, 1960) was a Canadian politician. He served in the Legislative Assembly of British Columbia from 1952 to 1960 from the electoral district of Oak Bay, a member of the Liberal Party. He died in office on March 4, 1960, from cancer.
