= Burton Peter Campbell =

Canadian politician (1937–2007)

Burt Campbell

MLA for Revelstoke-Slocan
- In office 1969–1972
- Preceded by: Randolph Harding
- Succeeded by: William King

Personal details
- Born: March 11, 1937 Kamloops, British Columbia
- Died: February 2007 (aged 69) Castlegar, British Columbia
- Party: British Columbia Social Credit Party
- Spouse: Judy McDiarmid (m.1962)
- Children: 3
- Education: Ryerson Polytechnical Institute
- Occupation: newspaper editor

Burton Peter "Burt" Campbell (March 11, 1937 – February 2007) was a Canadian politician. He served in the Legislative Assembly of British Columbia from 1969 to 1972 from the electoral district of Revelstoke-Slocan, a member of the Social Credit Party. He was an unsuccessful candidate in the 1963, 1966, 1972 and 1975 provincial general elections as well as a 1968 provincial byelection.
