= 1972 British Columbia time plebiscite =

Canadian time zone referendum

British Columbia time referendum
August 30, 1972
- Are you in favour of Pacific Standard time, including Pacific Daylight Saving time, as it is applicable now throughout the province?

Results
Choice	Votes	%
Yes	11,471	35.07%
No	21,236	64.93%
Valid votes	32,707	97.62%
Invalid or blank votes	797	2.38%
Total votes	33,504	100.00%

A referendum was held in British Columbia on August 30, 1972, simultaneously with a general election. The actual referendum only took place in four electoral districts and part of a fifth, all in the northeast or southeast parts of the province. The purpose of the vote was to determine which areas favoured following Mountain Time rather than Pacific Time and whether to follow daylight saving time or not. All areas chose to follow Mountain Time.

== Lead-up ==
The referendum was the result of events in Alberta where, in 1971, Albertans voted to enact daylight saving time. Areas in the Peace River Country and Southeast were economically tied to Alberta, and hence were also on Mountain Time.

The question was:

Are you in favour of Pacific Standard time, including Pacific Daylight Saving time, as it is applicable now throughout the province?

== Results ==
Only four ridings and part of a fifth took part in the referendum. The two ridings in the northeastern part of the province were North Peace River and South Peace River. The two ridings in the southeastern part were Columbia River and Kootenay. Residents of Nelson-Creston east of an imaginary line running through Kootenay Lake and the Kootenay River that bisected that riding also took part.

District	Yes	Percentage	No	Percentage	Rejected	Total
Columbia River	1366	34.95	2445	62.56	97	3908
Kootenay	4583	35.04	8123	62.11	372	13078
East part of Nelson-Creston	1900	49.39	1947	50.61	0	3847
North Peace River	1769	29.83	4079	68.77	83	5931
South Peace River	1853	27.49	4642	68.87	245	6740
Total	11471	34.24	21236	63.38	797	33504

== Aftermath ==
The result of the referendum was Mountain Time being used instead of Pacific Time in places that rejected Pacific Time (which had been province-wide). Hence, the boundary between time zones in British Columbia ended up being different from the provincial boundary.

The northeast is on Mountain Standard Time year-round, without daylight saving time. In practice, this means that time there is identical with Alberta's in the winter and the rest of BC's in summer. The southeast is similar, with most of the applicable area on Mountain Time and following DST. The Creston area is exceptional, ignoring DST. This puts that town in a situation similar to the northeast.

Since the time referendum the issue has flared up in Creston politics at least twice. At least two referendums have been held, neither of which succeeded in changing the status quo.

In 2014 residents of Fort Nelson voted in favour of switching from Pacific Time with DST to year-round Mountain Standard Time.
