= James Chabot =

Canadian politician (1927–1989)

Jim Chabot

Member of the British Columbia Legislative Assembly for Columbia River Columbia (1963-1966)
- In office September 30, 1963 – October 22, 1986
- Preceded by: Frank Greenwood
- Succeeded by: Duane Crandall

Personal details
- Born: May 8, 1927 Farnham, Quebec
- Died: October 9, 1989 (aged 62) Invermere, British Columbia
- Cause of death: Heart Attack
- Party: Social Credit

James Roland "Jim" Chabot (May 8, 1927 – October 9, 1989) was a Member of the Legislative Assembly of British Columbia, Canada for the riding of Columbia and its successor Columbia River from 1963 to 1986.

He was born in Farnham, Quebec, and moved to British Columbia during the 1950s. He was employed as a railway supervisor. In 1973, he ran unsuccessfully for the leadership of the Social Credit party. Chabot served in the provincial cabinet as Minister of Labour, Minister of Mines and Petroleum Resources, Minister of Lands, Parks and Housing, and Provincial Secretary and Minister of Government Services. He did not run for reelection in 1986. Chabot died at home in Invermere at the age of 62.

James Chabot Provincial Park on Windermere Lake in the Columbia Valley region, which was part of his riding, is named for him.
