= Leonard Bawtree =

Canadian politician (1924–2014)

MLA for Shuswap
- In office 1975–1979

Personal details
- Born: January 7, 1924 Enderby, British Columbia
- Died: June 7, 2014 (aged 90) Vernon, British Columbia
- Party: Social Credit Party of British Columbia

Leonard Bawtree (January 7, 1924 – June 7, 2014) was a Canadian politician. He served in the Legislative Assembly of British Columbia from 1975 to 1979, as a Social Credit member for the constituency of Shuswap.
