= Victor Stephens =

Canadian politician (born 1931)

Leader of the Conservative Party of British Columbia
- In office October 1977 – November 1980
- Preceded by: George Scott Wallace
- Succeeded by: Brian Westwood

Member of the British Columbia Legislative Assembly for Oak Bay
- In office March 20, 1978 – May 10, 1979
- Preceded by: George Scott Wallace
- Succeeded by: Brian Smith

Personal details
- Born: Victor Albert Stephens; 1931 (age 94–95) Calgary, Alberta, Canada
- Party: BC Conservative
- Children: 3
- Education: University of British Columbia

Victor Albert Stephens (born 1931) is a Canadian politician and lawyer who served as the leader of the Conservative Party of British Columbia from 1977 to 1980. He served as a member of the Legislative Assembly (MLA) representing the electoral district of Oak Bay from 1978 to 1979.

== Early life and education ==
Stephens was born in Calgary in 1931 and attended the University of British Columbia where he earned a law degree. Stephens was an active cross-country runner in his younger years. He also spent a year in Vanuatu with his wife and three children, where he worked as a lawyer representing the local population. In 2011, Stephens resided Boston Bar, British Columbia in the Nahatlatch River valley where he ran a RV resort and golf course with his brother.

== Political career ==
Stephens was elected leader of the Conservative Party of British Columbia in October 1977. He later went on to run in the 1978 Oak Bay provincial by-election, winning by 10 points.

In the 1979 general election, Stephens lost reelections only serving just over a year as a member of the Legislative Assembly (MLA). He was the last Conservative elected to the legislature until 2024.
