= Randolph Harding =

Canadian politician

Member of Parliament for Kootenay West
- In office 1968–1974
- Preceded by: Herbert Wilfred Herridge
- Succeeded by: Robert Brisco

Member of the Legislative Assembly of British Columbia
- In office 1945–1968
- Preceded by: Charles Sidney Leary
- Succeeded by: William King
- Constituency: Kaslo-Slocan (1945-1966); Revelstoke-Slocan (1966-1968)

Personal details
- Born: September 17, 1914 Silverton, British Columbia
- Died: March 3, 1996 (aged 81) Silverton, British Columbia
- Party: New Democratic Party of Canada
- Profession: teacher

Randolph Harding (September 17, 1914 – March 3, 1996) was a Canadian politician.

== Biography ==
Born in Silverton, British Columbia, Harding was a teacher and a member of the Silverton municipal council. He was elected as the Co-operative Commonwealth Federation candidate to the Legislative Assembly of British Columbia representing Kaslo-Slocan in 1945, and was re-elected in 1949, 1952, 1953, 1956, 1960 and 1963. In 1966 he was re-elected in the riding of Revelstoke-Slocan.

He was elected to the House of Commons of Canada in the 1968 federal election for the British Columbia riding of Kootenay West. A New Democrat, he was re-elected in 1972 and was defeated in 1974.

After leaving federal politics, Harding served as mayor of Silverton and received a long service award from the Union of British Columbia Municipalities.

Harding served in the Canadian Army during World War II.
