= Duane Crandall =

Canadian politician (born 1946)

MLA for Columbia River
- In office 1986–1991

Personal details
- Born: August 14, 1946 (age 79) Wetaskiwin, Alberta
- Party: Social Credit Party of British Columbia

Duane Delton Crandall (born August 14, 1946) was a Canadian politician. He served in the Legislative Assembly of British Columbia from 1986 to 1991, as a Social Credit member for the constituency of Columbia River.

On October 3, 1989, Crandall and three colleagues — Graham Bruce, David Mercier, and Doug Mowat — quit the governing Social Credit caucus to sit as "Independent Social Credit" members. In a joint statement, the four stressed that they "in no way desire[d] the fall of our government", but wished to spur an "open and realistic assessment" of Bill Vander Zalm's continued leadership. Crandall rejoined the Socred caucus on January 24, 1990, in order to better deal with a wave of layoffs in his riding. His decision caused the other three rebels to reflect on their future, and on February 14, they also rejoined the Socred caucus. He placed last among five candidates in the 1991 Social Credit Party leadership contest.
