= John de Wolf (politician) =

Canadian politician

John Anthony St. Etienne de Wolf (c. 1931 – May 28, 2003) was a journalist, economist and politician in British Columbia, Canada. He served as leader of the British Columbia Conservative Party from 1969 to 1971.

De Wolf was a special adviser to the Canadian finance minister and then worked as a journalist in the field of finance and economics. He was elected to the Conservative party leadership in June 1969. He was an unsuccessful candidate in the 1969 provincial election in the Vancouver-Point Grey riding. De Wolf was defeated by Derrill Warren in a convention held in November 1971. After losing the party leadership, he worked as a consultant and also was a policy adviser to the provincial government.

De Wolf died at St. Paul's Hospital in Vancouver in 2003.
