= Windermere Lake Provincial Park =

Provincial park in British Columbia, Canada

- IUCN category II (national park)
- Location within British Columbia
- Interactive map of Windermere Lake Provincial Park
- Location: British Columbia, Canada
- Nearest city: Windermere
- Coordinates: 50°25′44″N 115°58′14″W
- Area: 2.05 km^{2} (0.79 sq mi)
- Established: 1999
- Governing body: BC Parks
- Website: bcparks.ca/windermere-lake-park/

Windermere Lake Provincial Park is a provincial park in British Columbia, Canada, located 10 km south of Windermere.

== Geography ==
The park offers protection to scarce tracts of local native grasslands and habitat along the western shore of Windermere Lake. White-tail deer, mule deer, and elk use the area for winter range.
