= Alan Brock Macfarlane =

Canadian lawyer, judge, and politician (1924–2018)

MLA for Oak Bay
- In office 1960–1968

Personal details
- Born: May 17, 1924 Victoria, British Columbia
- Died: December 10, 2018 (aged 94) Victoria, British Columbia
- Party: Liberal Party of British Columbia

Alan Brock Macfarlane (May 17, 1924 – December 10, 2018) was a Canadian lawyer, judge and politician in British Columbia. He represented Oak Bay in the Legislative Assembly of British Columbia from 1960 to 1968 as a Liberal.

He was born in Victoria, British Columbia. Macfarlane served in the Royal Canadian Air Force during World War II. He studied law at the University of British Columbia and was called to the British Columbia bar in 1949. He resigned his seat in 1968 and was appointed to the Supreme Court of British Columbia. Macfarlane served as a justice in the British Columbia Court of Appeal from 1982 to 1995. Macfarlane died in December 2018 at the age of 94.
