= Windermere Lake (British Columbia) =

Lake in British Columbia, Canada

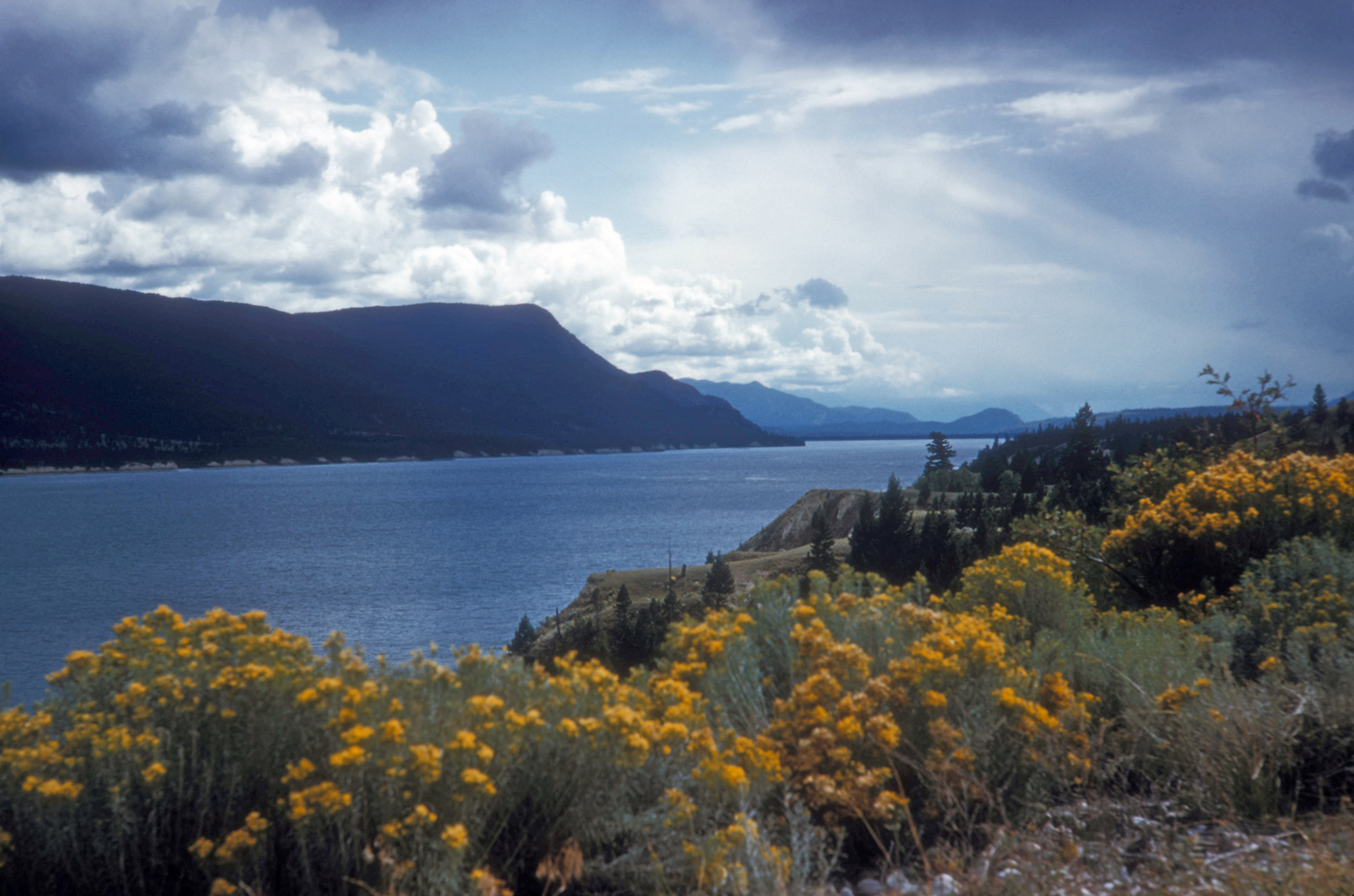

- Location within British Columbia
- Location: British Columbia
- Coordinates: 50°27′N 116°00′W
- Primary inflows: Columbia River
- Primary outflows: Columbia River
- Basin countries: Canada
- Surface area: 1,610 ha (4,000 acres)
- Average depth: 3.4 metres (11 ft)
- Max. depth: 6.4 metres (21 ft)
- Shore length^{1}: 36 km (22 mi)
- Surface elevation: 798 m (2,618 ft)
- Settlements: Windermere, Invermere
- ^{1} Shore length is not a well-defined measure.

Lake Windermere (or Windermere Lake) is a very large widening in the Columbia River. The village of Windermere is located on the east side of the lake, and the larger town of Invermere is located on the lake's northwestern corner. The average depth of the lake is only 15 feet (4.6 m).

Lake Windermere is a popular vacationing spot, especially for residents of Calgary, which is a three-hour car drive to the east. The western side of the lake which fronts the Purcell Mountains has a railroad running along its shore, and as a result, housing and recreational development is minimal there. The eastern side of the lake has a more extensive flatland between the lake and the Rocky Mountains and has experienced considerable development including cottages, camping grounds, recreational beaches, golf courses and various tourist attractions.

Windermere Lake was once known as Lower Columbia Lake, and will be seen as such on older maps of the area. It was given its current name by G.M. Sproat in 1902 because it resembled Lake Windermere in the English Lake District.

== Lake Windermere Whiteway ==
The longest ice skating trail can be found on the Lake Windermere Whiteway. The naturally frozen trail measures 29.98 kilometres (18.63 mi). When Guinness Book of World Records verified the record in 2014, the ice measured between 12 inches (30 cm) and 30 inches (76 cm) depending where you were in one of the four loops that runs continuously around the lake.

== See also ==
- List of lakes of British Columbia
- Windermere Lake Provincial Park
