= 1979 British Columbia general election =

Canadian provincial election

- May 10, 1979

57 seats of the Legislative Assembly of British Columbia 29 seats were needed for a majority
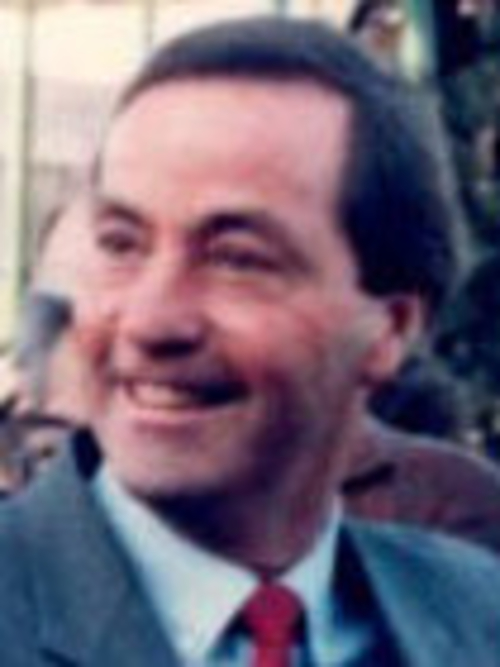

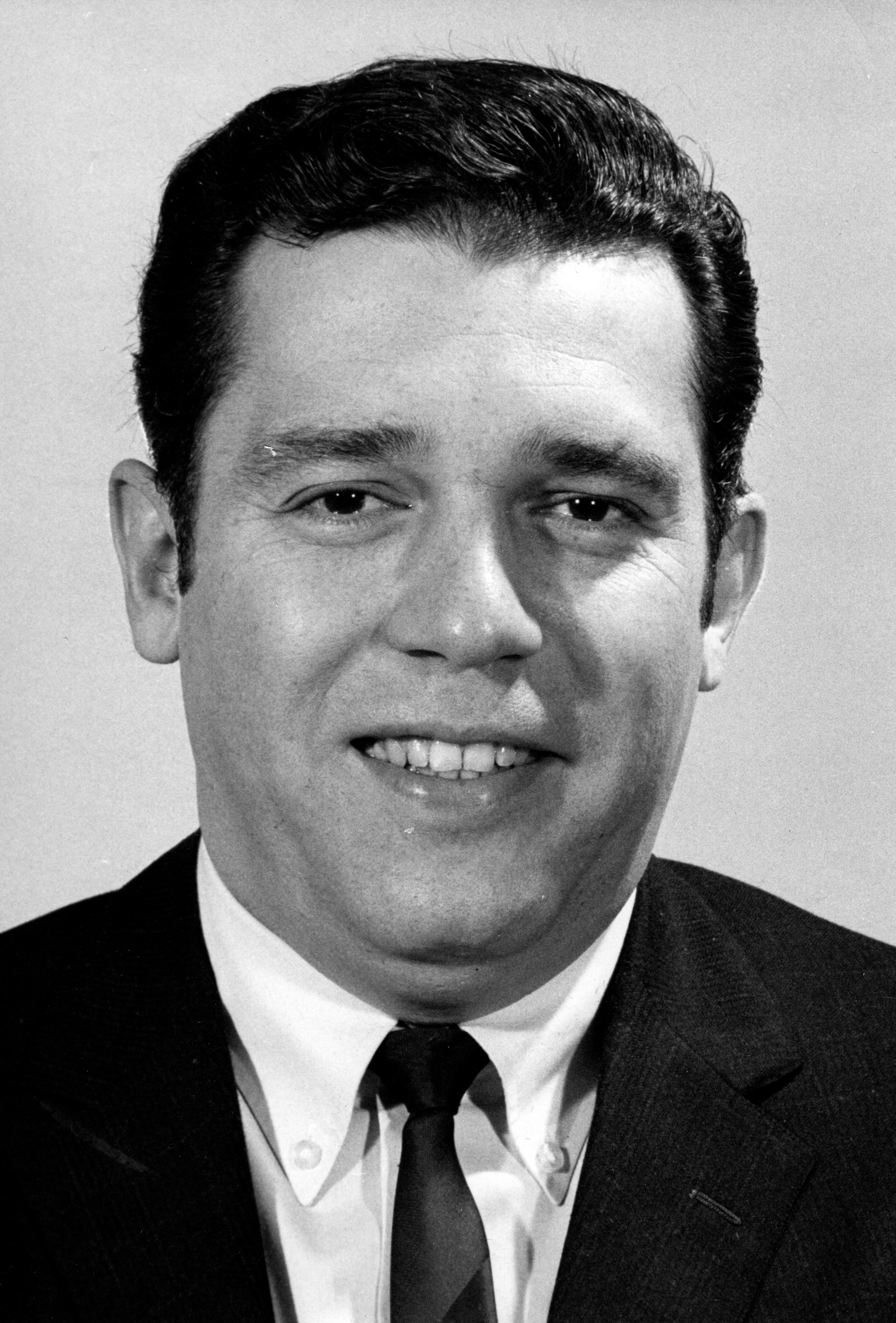
	First party	Second party	Third party
			PC
Leader	Bill Bennett	Dave Barrett	Victor Stephens
Party	Social Credit	New Democratic	Progressive Conservative
Leader since	1973	1969	1977
Leader's seat	Okanagan South	Vancouver East	Oak Bay-Gordon Head (lost re-election)
Last election	35 seats, 49.25%	18 seats, 39.16%	1 seat, 3.86%
Seats won	31	26	0
Seat change	▼4	▲8	▼1
Popular vote	677,607	646,188	71,078
Percentage	48.23%	45.99%	5.06%
Swing	▼1.02	▲6.83	▲1.20
Premier before election
Bill Bennett
Social Credit
Premier after election
Bill Bennett
Social Credit

The 1979 British Columbia general election was the 32nd general election in the Province of British Columbia, Canada. It was held to elect members of the Legislative Assembly of British Columbia. The election was called on April 3, 1979. The election was held on May 10, 1979, and the new legislature met for the first time on June 6, 1979.

The governing Social Credit Party of British Columbia of Bill Bennett was re-elected with a majority government, and won almost half of the popular vote. The electorate was polarized between the Socreds and the social democratic New Democratic Party of former premier Dave Barrett, which won just under 46% of the popular vote and all of the remaining seats in the legislature. The NDP made up much of the ground it had lost in its severe defeat of four years earlier. However, the Socreds dominated the Fraser Valley and the Interior, allowing Bennett to cling to government by three seats.

Of the other parties, only the Progressive Conservatives won over 1% of the popular vote, but their 5% of the vote did not enable them to hold on to their single seat in the legislature. The Conservatives would not return to the legislature until 2024. The party leader, Victor Stephens, complained during the campaign that the Federal PC Party was providing no assistance to the provincial party and favoured Social Credit instead. That caused embarrassment for the federal party leader, Joe Clark, who was leading his own election campaign for the May 22, 1979 federal election. The Liberals were shut out of the legislature, garnered only 0.5% of the vote, and did not return until 1991.

== Results ==
Party	Party leader	# of candidates	Seats			Popular vote		
Party	Party leader	# of candidates	1975	Elected	% Change	#	%	% Change
Social Credit	Bill Bennett	57	35	31	-11.4%	677,607	48.23%	-1.02%
New Democrats	Dave Barrett	57	18	26	44.4%	646,188	45.99%	+6.83%
Progressive Conservative	Victor Stephens	37	1	-	-100%	71,078	5.06%	+1.20%
Liberal	Jev Tothill	5	1	-	-100%	6,662	0.47%	-6.77%
Communist		7	-	-	-	1,159	0.08%	-0.03%
Independent		5	-	-	-	1,098	0.08%	-0.28%
Western Independence		2	*	-	*	555	0.04%	*
North American Labour		4	-	-	-	297	0.02%	+0.01%
Marxist–Leninist		2	*	-	*	235	0.02%	*
Gay Alliance Toward Equality		1	*	-	*	126	0.01%	*
Independent New Hope		1	*	-	*	72	0.01%	*
Total		178	55	57	+3.6%	1,405,077	100%	

Note:

* Party did not nominate candidates in the previous election.

Popular vote
Social Credit	48.23%
NDP	45.99%
PC	5.06%
Others	0.72%

Seats summary
Social Credit	54.39%
NDP	45.61%

== See also ==
- List of British Columbia political parties
