= Conservative Party of British Columbia =

Provincial political party in Canada

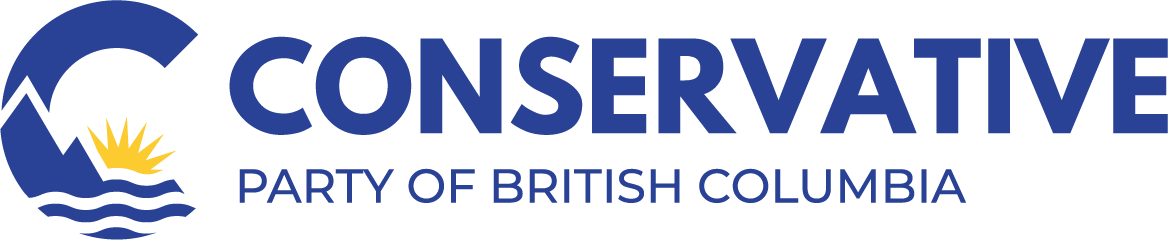
- Leader: Lorne Doerkson (interim)
- President: Mauro Francis
- Founded: 1903; 123 years ago
- Headquarters: 1434 Ironwood Street; Unit 327; Campbell River, British Columbia; V9W 5T5
- Membership (2026): ▲41,718
- Ideology: Conservatism (Canadian)
- Political position: Centre-right to right-wing
- Colours: Blue
- Legislative Assembly: 64 / 93

Website
- conservativebc.ca

The Conservative Party of British Columbia, commonly known as the BC Conservatives and colloquially known as the Tories, is a provincial political party in British Columbia, Canada. Since 2026, it has formed government in the Legislative Assembly of British Columbia.

In the first half of the 20th century, the Conservatives competed with the BC Liberal Party for power in the province. During this period, three party leaders served as premier of British Columbia: Richard McBride (1903–1915), William John Bowser (1915–1916), and Simon Fraser Tolmie (1928–1933). Royal Maitland and Herbert Anscomb served as deputy premiers, both during the coalition governments of the 1940s. The party's influence diminished in the second half of the century, with the Conservatives having only a minor presence in the legislature after the 1950s; they did not elect a member of the Legislative Assembly (or MLA) in any general election from 1975 to 2024.

The party saw a resurgence under the leadership of John Rustad, who was originally elected as a BC Liberal MLA in 2005 before being expelled from the Liberal caucus in 2022. In the October 2024 provincial election, the party won 44 seats, forming the official opposition; this was its best electoral performance in 72 years. By September 2026, infighting within the CPBC caucus had reduced the party to a low of 24 seats, although enough to still maintain official opposition status. The Conservatives returned to power in the October 2026 provincial election under interim leader Lorne Doerkson, defeating the BC New Democratic Party and forming a majority government.

== History ==
=== Founding and early years ===
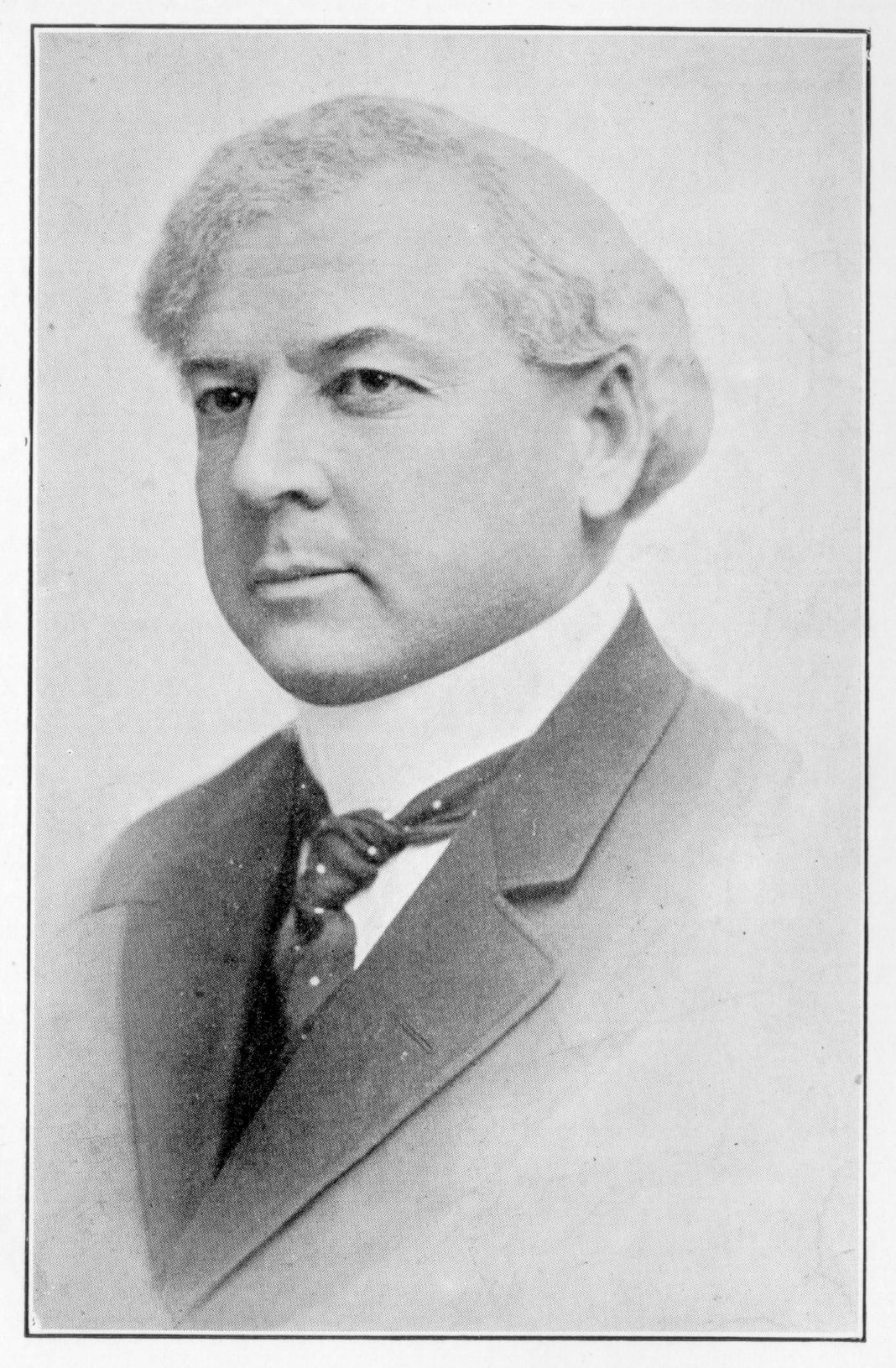
Richard McBride, the first Conservative Premier of British Columbia

The Conservative Party of British Columbia was formed in 1900 as the Liberal-Conservative Party, before the province officially embraced partisan politics. The party selected Charles Wilson as its first leader. Several opposition factions contested the 1900 general election against the non-partisan government, but these were generally loose affiliations. In 1902, the Conservative Party convention passed a resolution to stand candidates in the next election.

Party government was introduced on June 1, 1903, by Premier Richard McBride, when he announced the formation of an officially Conservative government. McBride believed that the system of non-partisan government that the province had until that point was unstable and inhibiting development. His Conservatives won the 1903 election, the first fought on the party system, earning a two-seat majority in the British Columbia Legislative Assembly over their rivals, the Liberal Party, as well as various Socialist and Labour MLAs. The Conservatives generally implemented policies mirroring the priorities of the national Conservative Party, which at the time favoured government intervention to help develop industry and infrastructure.

The Conservatives under McBride and his successor, William John Bowser, held power for 13 years until they were defeated by the Liberals in the 1916 election. In November 1926, the Liberal-Conservative Party formally changed its name to the Conservative Party.

=== Tolmie government and crisis ===
The Conservatives returned to power in the 1928 election under the leadership of Simon Fraser Tolmie, winning 35 of 48 seats in the Legislature. The Tolmie government was confronted with the Great Depression, and was wracked by infighting and indecision. The party was in such disarray that, despite being in power, the Conservative provincial association decided not to run any candidates in the 1933 election. Instead, each local association was left to act on its own, endorsing some candidates who ran as Independents, some as Independent Conservatives, and so on. Those supporting Premier Tolmie ran under the 'Unionist Party of British Columbia' label, while others grouped around former premier William John Bowser and ran as part of the 'Non-Partisan Independent Group'. When Bowser died and the elections in Vancouver Centre and Victoria City were postponed, four Non-partisan and two Unionist candidates withdrew. In the election, one Unionist was elected along with two MLAs for the Non-Partisan Independent Group and one for the "Oxford Group".

The Conservative Party rebounded under Frank Porter Patterson to run a near-full slate in the election of 1937, however they were only able to elect eight MLAs, just one more than the growing Co-operative Commonwealth Federation (CCF) caucus. In the election of 1941, the Conservatives were able to win 12 seats, compared to 21 for the Liberals and 14 for the CCF. Members of the province's business community, who feared the growing strength of the democratic socialist CCF, urged the Liberals and Conservatives to form a wartime coalition government to ensure stability. Conservative leader Royal Maitland agreed, while Liberal premier T. D. Pattullo was opposed; however, Pattullo was forced to resign by his own party in late 1941. John Hart replaced him as Liberal leader and premier on the promise to form a coalition, making Maitland deputy premier and attorney general shortly thereafter.

=== Coalition years ===
In 1942, the BC Conservative Party rebranded as the BC Progressive Conservative Party, following the lead of the federal party. Maitland and Hart served throughout the remainder of World War II and continued their partnership past, running a joint ticket in the 1945 election and winning a majority government of 37 out of 48 seats. However, Maitland died suddenly in 1946 and was replaced by Herbert Anscomb, who became deputy premier and finance minister in the coalition government. When Premier Hart retired in 1947, the Conservatives pushed for Anscomb to succeed him as premier, but the Liberals, who had more members in the coalition caucus, insisted that the role remain with a Liberal. Byron Johnson was appointed Premier a short time later, but the conflict strained relations between the two parties and leaders going forward, and caused internal divisions to open up within the Conservatives.

The PCs were riven into three factions: one led by Okanagan MLA W.A.C. Bennett, who called for the Liberals and Conservatives to fuse into a single party; a second faction that supported the status-quo; and a third that wanted Anscomb to simply lead the PCs out of the coalition. Meanwhile, the Liberals were beginning to doubt that they needed the fractious Conservatives to govern. The coalition was re-elected in the 1949 election, winning 39 seats against nine for the CCF opposition, but despite this, growing divisions within the Conservative Party resulted in Anscomb's leadership being challenged at the 1950 party convention. Bennett, who had moved over to the anti-coalition faction, quit the party and crossed the floor to sit as a Social Credit League of British Columbia member, eventually forming the BC Social Credit Party.

In January 1952, the Liberals decided to dissolve the coalition, with Johnson summarily dismissing his PC ministers, including Anscomb; they continued forward as a minority government. The Conservatives properly re-founded their party and went into the 1952 election with the goal of unseating Premier Johnson.

=== Decline ===
Prior to the 1952 election, the coalition government, whose entire reason for being had been to keep the CCF out of power, introduced an instant-runoff voting system. The assumption behind the change was that business-oriented voters would keep the democratic socialist party out of power through their secondary choices, regardless of the split between the former coalition partners. However, the Social Credit League, led by Albertan Ernest George Hansell, won the most seats in the election, while the two former coalition partners fell far behind. The PCs won only four seats, not including Anscomb's Oak Bay constituency. Two months later, former Tory W.A.C. Bennett would take control of the Socreds; he dropped the party's social credit monetary reform policy in favour of traditional and populist platforms.

It was clear to those who wanted to keep the CCF out of power that only the Socreds would be able to accomplish that task; as such, business-oriented voters left the old parties behind. Having a majority government following 1953, the Social Credit government changed the electoral system back to first past the post in order to cement its base. Social Credit became, in effect, the new centre-right coalition party, and both the Liberals and the Conservatives became marginalized.

=== Wilderness years ===
Between the 1956 and 1972 elections, the Conservatives won no seats in the Legislature; as a result, the party began to dwindle. After 1960, the party would not run a full slate of candidates again until 2024. Deane Finlayson served as leader from 1952 until 1961, eventually handing the reins to federal Member of Parliament Davie Fulton. Fulton led the party to a brief surge of relevance in the 1963 election, winning 11% of the vote but no seats, with even Fulton falling far behind his Socred opponent in the Kamloops constituency. Fulton left soon after, returning to federal politics while the BC Conservatives collapsed into ruin. The party ran only three candidates in the 1966 election, and just one, party leader John de Wolf, in the 1969 election.

In 1971, former Socred MLA Scott Wallace, who represented Oak Bay, crossed the floor to join the PCs; he became the party's first MLA in 15 years. The PCs earned nearly 13% of the vote in the 1972 election and two seats—Wallace's and Hugh Curtis in Saanich and the Islands, both in the Victoria area. The election was won by the CCF's successor party, the New Democratic Party (NDP), who took advantage of the split between the Socreds, Conservatives, and resurgent Liberals to form a majority government.

Wallace was elected leader of the party in 1973. However, in 1974, his caucus mate Curtis left to join the Social Credit caucus, answering a call by new leader Bill Bennett to reunite the 'pro-business' vote. Wallace was able to win his own seat in the 1975 election. However, he resigned in 1977 and returned to his medical practice shortly after. Wallace's successor in Oak Bay and the party leadership was the last Tory MLA to be elected. Vic Stephens won the seat in a 1978 by-election, but lost in the following year's general election campaign.

During this time, with most of their voters in BC supporting Social Credit, the federal Progressive Conservative Party kept its distance in order to avoid alienating Social Credit Party supporters. When the federal and provincial election campaigns overlapped in 1979, federal leader Joe Clark made obvious efforts to avoid any contact with Stephens. The Conservatives returned to the political wilderness in the following years. For a brief stint in 1986, former NDP MLA Graham Lea crossed the floor to sit as a PC MLA, but quit politics altogether following the dissolution of the Legislature for the 1986 election.

In 1991, the party changed its name back to the BC Conservative Party. However, the party was unable to gain traction during the collapse of the Socred government in the 1991 election and the subsequent re-alignment of BC politics. The party ran only a handful of candidates between 1991 and 2005, as the pro-business voters of the province moved en masse to the BC Liberals.

=== Twenty-first century revival efforts ===
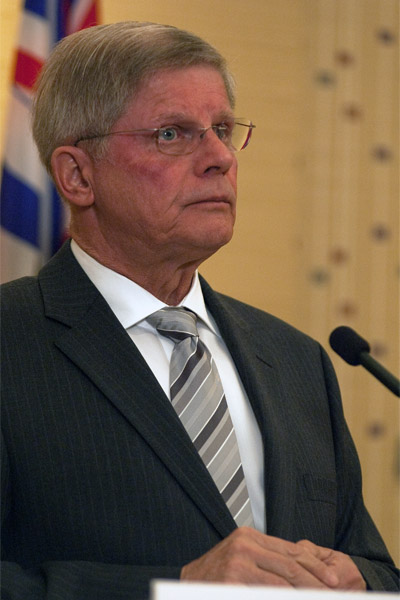
Party leader John Cummins in 2011

In 2005, former BC Reform Party and Christian conservative British Columbia Party leader Wilf Hanni was elected leader of the Conservatives. The party fielded 24 candidates in the 2009 election, its highest number since 1979, and earned 2.1% of the vote. In the aftermath of the election, Hanni resigned as party leader, along with eleven directors and party officials, citing infighting.

By the end of 2010, with former Newfoundland premier Brian Peckford acting as an advisor, the party had the support of 8% of voters according to opinion polls, had approximately 2,000 members—up from 300 in June of that year—and had constituency associations established in 45 of the province's 85 ridings. The party received another boost in 2011. After Christy Clark defeated Kevin Falcon for the BC Liberal leadership, a segment of Falcon's supporters defected to the Conservative ranks. The Conservatives held their own leadership convention on May 28, 2011, where former Conservative Party of Canada Member of Parliament John Cummins was proclaimed leader. By late 2011, Conservative support had surged to 18%.

On March 26, 2012, Abbotsford South MLA John van Dongen announced that he was leaving the Liberals to join the Conservatives, providing the party with its first representative in the Legislative Assembly since 1986. However, six months later van Dongen switched to Independent status after Cummins was re-elected party leader without van Dongen's support. Van Dongen stated that he lacked confidence in Cummins' leadership and cited differences about the party's direction as reasons for leaving.

In the run-up to the 2013 election, the party was able to field only 56 candidates. Nevertheless, Cummins was invited to join the leaders of the Liberals, NDP, and Greens on-stage for the leaders' debates. The Conservatives ultimately received less than 5% of the vote and had no candidates elected. On July 18, 2013, Cummins resigned as party leader. Dan Brooks was elected the new leader of the party on April 12, 2014. Brooks resigned at the party's annual general meeting on February 20, 2016. However, stating that outstanding issues that led to his resignations were resolved, Brooks was re-elected as leader at a leadership convention held on September 17, 2016. On October 28, 2016, the party's executive board removed Brooks from the leadership after ruling that the meeting that approved his candidacy for the leadership convention lacked quorum. Brooks criticized the decision, stating that the executive were "like praying mantises, they eat their leaders".

The party did not select a new leader before the start of the 2017 election campaign. As such, the Conservatives entered the election campaign without a leader. The party nominated only ten candidates, none of whom were elected. In September 2017, following the party's annual general meeting, Scott Anderson, a Vernon city councillor, was appointed interim leader by a unanimous vote of the newly elected board. Anderson oversaw the reformation of several defunct riding associations and an increase in membership, and took the party through the Kelowna West and Nanaimo by-elections. Fort St. John city councillor Trevor Bolin became the party's new permanent leader on April 8, 2019.

The party altered its name to the Conservative Party of British Columbia prior to the 2020 general election.

During the BC Liberal leadership race in 2022, conservative commentator Aaron Gunn was disqualified by the party, which described his views as "inconsistent" with Liberal values including "diversity and acceptance of all British Columbians". Following his disqualification, Gunn founded Common Sense BC, an advocacy group to study the viability of a right-wing alternative to the BC Liberals. Common Sense endorsed a slate of candidates who stood for election to the Conservative Party board at the May 2022 annual general meeting, effectively launching a takeover of the party. The endorsed candidates, including conservative strategist Angelo Isidorou, were elected, and right-wing activists took control of the party. In August 2022, the party revealed a new logo, alongside a new website and platform. Isidorou went on to serve as executive director and provincial campaign manager in the 2024 election.

=== Resurgence under Rustad ===
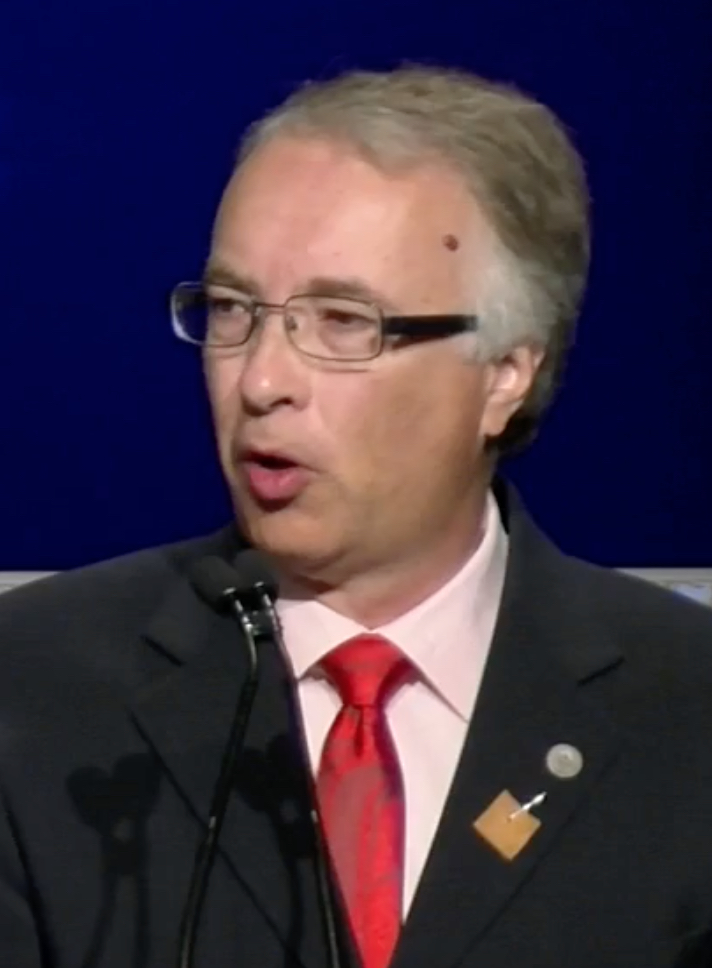
John Rustad became party leader in 2023 after crossing the floor from the BC Liberals

On February 16, 2023, John Rustad, MLA for Nechako Lakes, joined the Conservative Party, giving the party representation in the Legislature for the first time since 2012. Rustad had been elected as a Liberal but was removed from the party's caucus in August 2022 after he refused to undo his retweet of a comment casting doubt on the scientific consensus that climate change is caused by carbon dioxide emissions; after the removal, Rustad sat as an Independent. Rustad cited "irreconcilable differences" with Liberal leader Kevin Falcon in explaining his decision to join the Conservatives.

Bolin announced on March 3, 2023, that he was stepping down as party leader; further, a party leadership race would be held in the near future. Three weeks later, Rustad announced that he was running for the party's leadership. On March 31, 2023, Rustad was acclaimed as the new leader as the only candidate in the race.

In the June 2023 Vancouver-Mount Pleasant and Langford-Juan de Fuca by-elections, the Conservative candidates placed fourth and second, with 4.88% and 19.86% of the vote, respectively. The second place finish in Langford-Juan de Fuca, ahead of the centre-right BC United (formerly the BC Liberals), indicated a surge in support for the Conservatives, which was seen to echo that of the federal Conservative Party, which by 2023 was surging in national polls.

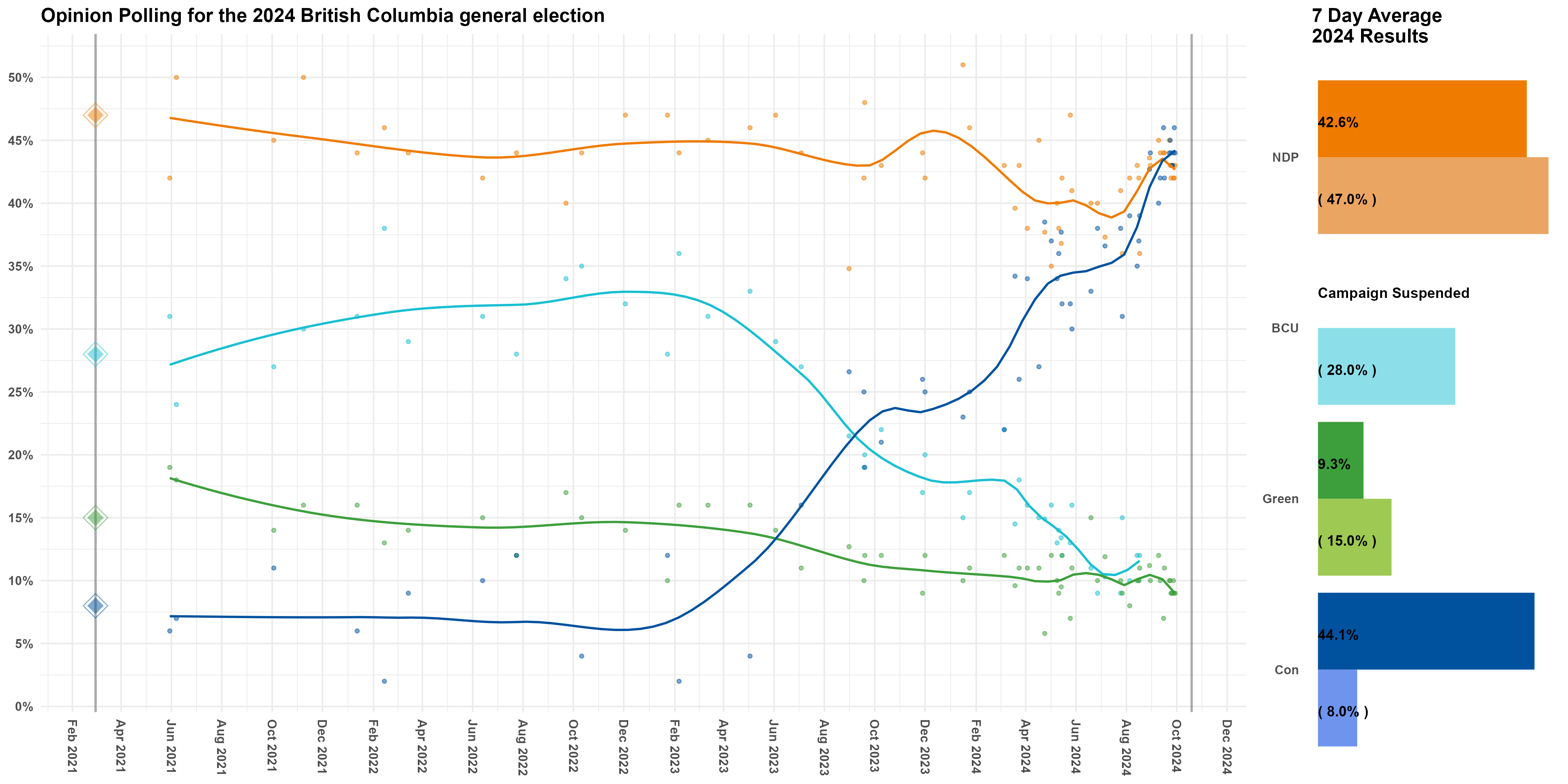
Polling ahead of the 2024 BC general election showing increased support for the party

On September 13, 2023, BC United MLA Bruce Banman crossed the floor to join the Conservatives. This gave the Conservatives the two MLAs necessary for official party status, and Banman was named party house leader. As a result of the party gaining official status, the Legislative Assembly Management Committee approved $214,000 in funding for the Conservative caucus, equivalent to the two-MLA Green caucus.

On May 31, 2024, BC United MLA and caucus chair Lorne Doerkson crossed the floor to the Conservatives. Doerkson was followed by BC United's MLA for Surrey South, Elenore Sturko on June 3, who also announced her intention to run in Surrey-Cloverdale for the upcoming election. BC United MLA for Richmond North Centre and former Minister of Trade Teresa Wat followed them on July 29.

Under Rustad's leadership, the party was criticized by opponents for running candidates espousing conspiracy theories. Rustad was the subject of media attention for several controversial claims, including that children may be forced to eat insects, that vaccine mandates are about "shaping opinion and control on the population", and a social media post which critics said compared Sexual Orientation and Gender Identity (SOGI) education to the Canadian residential school system.

In the lead-up to the 2024 election, a leaked dossier of opposition research revealed support for conspiracy theories among several party candidates. The party dropped several candidates for spreading misinformation on vaccination and medical issues, including Stephen Malthouse, Jan Webb, and Rachael Weber. The party also dropped Damon Scrase for homophobic and racist comments, and Alexandra Wright after "careful consideration of various factors related to campaign performance and conduct". BC United implied the latter decision was because Wright had re-posted a statement calling for a criminal investigation into health minister Adrian Dix and provincial health officer Bonnie Henry, while Wright herself believed it was due to a conflict she had with a local fruit packer.

==== Official Opposition ====
Leading up to the 2024 provincial election, polls showed the Conservatives displacing BC United as the main challenger to the incumbent BC NDP. On August 28, 2024, BC United leader Falcon announced that his party, lagging in the polls, was suspending its campaign after negotiations with Rustad, and that he was putting his support behind Rustad and the Conservatives. In addition, it was announced that some candidates from the BC United roster could run as Conservatives for the election. Popular support for the Conservatives surged after the announcement, with the party in a statistical tie in opinion polling with the NDP by mid-September. The rise of the Conservatives at the expense of BC United was noted by some commentators to have changed political discourse in the province, with the Conservatives and NDP both leaning more into culture war issues. The Conservatives ultimately won 44 of the 93 seats it contested, forming the official opposition and entering the Legislative Assembly for the first time since 1975.

=== Infighting while Official Opposition ===
Rustad's leadership in the 43rd Parliament was marked by internal party disputes, with the expulsions and departures of MLAs Dallas Brodie, Jordan Kealy, Tara Armstrong, Elenore Sturko, and Amelia Boultbee. In addition, Brodie and Armstrong formed a splinter party, named OneBC. In September 2025, Rustad won a leadership review with 70% support and 15% turnout. Shortly afterwards, he removed Sturko from caucus alleging that she was undermining his leadership; Sturko said that Rustad was silencing socially liberal views in the party. At the start of October 2025, Rustad upset his party's social conservative wing by firing longtime staffer Lindsay Shepherd over calling the Truth and Reconciliation flag a "disgrace" and "fake" in the lead-up to the National Day for Truth and Reconciliation. After Boultbee's departure, the party's management committee, led by the party president, called on Rustad to step down as leader. Rustad declined to do so.

On December 3, 2025, 20 of the 39-member caucus signed a letter calling for Rustad to resign from his position as leader. The party's board of directors then passed a resolution declaring Rustad "professionally incapacitated" and ousting him as leader, appointing Surrey-White Rock MLA Trevor Halford as interim leader. However, in the immediate aftermath, five Conservative MLAs refused to acknowledge the board's decision and said that Rustad remained party leader, and Rustad himself, citing the party's constitution, rejected that he had been removed. The next day, the right-wing blog Western Standard reported that Rustad would step down as leader; shortly thereafter, Rustad announced that he had resigned, seeking to avoid what he described as a "civil war" within the party.

During the 2026 CPBC leadership election, several candidates ran to lead the party. By a narrow margin, former federal Conservative MP Kerry-Lynne Findlay was elected party leader. As Findlay does not have a seat in the Legislative Assembly, Heather Maahs was appointed Leader of the Official Opposition.

Shortly after Findlay was elected leader, the party saw further internal strife. From mid-August to early September 2026, nine BC Conservative MLAs left the party in a three-week period: Peter Milobar, Ian Paton, Rosalyn Bird, Teresa Wat, Brennan Day, Bruce Banman, Á'a:líya Warbus, Donegal Wilson and Scott McInnis. Coupled with the earlier losses, the defections brought the BC Conservatives down to 28 seats, from the 44 seats they won less than two years earlier, in the October 2024 general election,

Also in August 2026, the Royal Canadian Mounted Police began investigating the party after Paton alleged that, a few weeks after Findlay won the May 2026 leadership vote, her chief of staff offered him a well-paying position in party operations in exchange for resigning his seat and allowing Findlay to contest the ensuing by-election. It is an offence under the Criminal Code to negotiate a reward or benefit related to resignation from political office.

After their resignations, Milobar and Paton announced their intention to form a new party, with Bird, Banman, and Warbus joining them in September. These five MLAs, later joined by three others, ended up joining CentreBC on September 18, with Milobar becoming party leader.

On September 18, 2026, the CPBC ejected three more MLAs from its caucus in Rustad, Halford, and Claire Rattée, with Linda Hepner leaving two days later, further reducing it to 24 seats; despite the loss of 45% of the seats it won in December 2024, the party still maintained its position as the official opposition in the Legislative Assembly of British Columbia.

Findlay resigned on September 20 after 113 days in post. Lorne Doerkson, MLA for Cariboo-Chilcotin, was appointed as interim leader. Despite her resignation as leader, Findlay remained the party's candidate for the 2026 Abbotsford-Mission provincial by-election, which was triggered after incumbent MLA Reann Gasper resigned to allow Findlay to seek a seat in the legislature. However, the by-election was cancelled a few days later when premier David Eby called an early election.

On September 21, five MLAs were brought back into the caucus by Doerkson.

=== Doerkson government ===
The Conservatives won a majority government in the 2026 British Columbia general election, for the first time since the 1928 election. Doerkson subsequently became the first interim party leader to win an election in Canadian history. The Doerkson ministry was sworn in on November 20, 2026.

== Ideology and positions ==
For much of its history, the Conservatives subscribed to a free enterprise ideological platform, although this platform was often overshadowed by centre-right coalitions like those of the BC Social Credit and BC Liberal parties. However, the Conservatives, especially in the 21st century, sought to offer a more right-wing alternative; with the breakdown of formerly-successful centre-right coalitions, the party enjoyed renewed popularity. In 2017, party communications director John Twigg compared the party's populist and anti-establishment rhetoric with that of the Brexit movement and that of supporters of Donald Trump.

Under John Rustad's leadership, the party portrayed itself as more mainstream and "common sense" in order to broaden its appeal. In 2023 and 2024, Rustad described his party as a "centre-right alternative" to BC United, the BC NDP, and the BC Greens, while matching the rhetoric of the federal Conservative Party in focusing on affordability and crime. The party under Rustad has been labelled both centre-right and right-wing. However, the party has included among its candidates and leadership a number of conspiracy theorists and individuals with "extreme views on COVID-19".

After the resignation of party leader Kerry-Lynne Findlay in September 2026, the party was described as "sort of [...] centre-right" by political scientist Hamish Telford. Fellow political scientist Stewart Prest stated that the party had veered right-ward, in comparison to the more centrist CentreBC.

=== Economic issues ===
The party advocates for increased resource extraction with fewer environmental roadblocks, and calls to further develop the province's fossil fuel and lumber industries. It seeks to eliminate the provincial carbon tax, roll back climate-friendly building codes, and consider nuclear power as an energy option. It also seeks to expand support for farmers by increasing local food processing capacity, and to bring in private auto insurance companies.

=== Healthcare ===
The party supports allowing for both public and private health-care options and allowing patients who are waiting for care in BC to access services at approved out-of-province clinics. It opposes COVID-19 vaccine mandates for health care workers and has promised to compensate health-care workers who lost their jobs as a result.

=== Housing ===
In 2024, party leader John Rustad told supporters that he would scrap a housing reform by the BC NDP that legalized fourplexes on lots that previously only allowed single-family housing and sixplexes on lots near rapid transit stations. Instead, the Conservatives would work with local governments to use pre-zoning to increase density and supply in specific areas. The party has proposed a $1,500 a month housing costs rebate for both renters and homeowners starting in 2026, supports incentives for rental construction, and has promised it will not bring in low-barrier housing or homeless shelters without community consent.

=== Social issues ===
Political analysts have described the party as socially conservative, in contrast to the big tent social position of BC United. Rustad often clashed on social issues with BC premier David Eby in the legislature. Rustad accused Eby of being an "authoritarian socialist" in 2023, while in 2024, Eby accused the Conservatives of embodying "the worst traits of American populism".

Rustad said that under a BC Conservative government, access to abortion and contraception "will remain exactly as it is now."

The party opposes BC's Sexual Orientation and Gender Identity (SOGI) education policies and safe injection sites for drug users. The party proposes that people suffering from severe drug addiction be involuntarily committed to drug rehabilitation centres, and opposes the now rolled-back NDP drug decriminalization pilot program. It supports increased funding for law enforcement and justice reform measures to deal with repeat or violent offenders.

== Membership ==
In an interview in August 2024, Rustad claimed that party membership had grown from 500 to around 9,000 since his acclamation as party leader in March 2023. At the time of Rustad's leadership review in September 2025, the party was reportedly still at around 9,000 members.

On April 21, 2026, the BC Conservative Party shared that they hit a record membership high of 42,000 members, up from 7,000 members in December 2025. The membership figure was later confirmed to be exactly 41,718 members.

== Party leaders ==
# denotes interim leader or vacancy

#	Leader	Tenure	Highest position
#^{[a]}	Charles Wilson	1899–1903	Party leader
1	Richard McBride	1903 – December 1915	Premier (1903–1915)
2	William John Bowser	December 1915 – August 1924	Premier (1915–1916)
#	Robert Henry Pooley	August 1924 – November 1926	Leader of the Opposition (1924–1928)
3	Simon Fraser Tolmie	November 1926 – May 1936	Premier (1928–1933)
#	Frank Porter Patterson	May 1936 – February 1938	Leader of the Opposition (1937–1938)
4	Royal Lethington Maitland	September 1938 – March 1946	Deputy premier (1941–1946)
5	Herbert Anscomb	April 1946 – November 1952	Deputy premier (1946–1952)
6	Deane Finlayson	November 1952 – April 1961	Party leader
#	Vacant	April 1961 – January 1963	—
7	Davie Fulton	January 1963 – April 1965	Party leader
#	Vacant	April 1965 – June 1969	—
8	John de Wolf	June 1969 – November 1971	Party leader
9	Derril Thomas Warren	November 1971 – December 1973	Party leader
10	George Scott Wallace	December 1973 – October 1977	Party leader
11	Victor Stephens	October 1977 – November 1980	Party leader
12	Brian Westwood	November 1980 – March 1985	Party leader
13	Peter Pollen	March 1985 – August 1986	Party leader
#	Vacant	August 1986 – July 1991	—
14	Peter B. Macdonald	July 1991 – March 1997	Party leader
15	David Mercier	March 1997 – January 2001	Party leader
16	Susan Power	2001–2003	Party leader
17	Kenneth Edgar King	2003–2004	Party leader
18	Barry Edward Chilton	2004–2005	Party leader
19	Wilf Hanni	2005–2009 (Note: Served as interim leader from September 24, 2005 to March 18, 2006)	Party leader
#	Vacant	2009 – May 2011	—
20	John Cummins	May 2011 – July 2013	Party leader
#	Vacant	July 2013 – April 2014	—
21	Dan Brooks	April 2014 – February 2016^{[b]}	Party leader
#	Vacant	February 2016 – October 2017	—
#	Scott Anderson	October 4, 2017 – April 8, 2019	Party leader
22	Trevor Bolin	April 8, 2019 – March 31, 2023	Party leader
23	John Rustad	March 31, 2023 – December 4, 2025	Leader of the Opposition (2024–2025)
#	Trevor Halford	December 4, 2025 – May 30, 2026	Leader of the Opposition
24	Kerry-Lynne Findlay	May 30, 2026 – September 20, 2026	Party leader
#	Lorne Doerkson	September 20, 2026 – present	Premier (2026–present)

=== Notes ===
^{a} Wilson served as leader before the province officially allowed party politics.
^{b} After resigning as leader in February 2016, Brooks ran again for leadership in September 2016; although he was elected, he was removed the following month when the party executive ruled that his nomination meeting had lacked quorum.

== Election results ==
Election	Leader	Votes	%	Seats	+/–	Position	Status
1903	Richard McBride	27,913	46.43	22 / 42	▲22	▲1st	Majority
1907	Richard McBride	30,781	48.70	26 / 42	▲4	1st	Majority
1909	Richard McBride	53,074	52.33	38 / 42	▲12	1st	Majority
1912	Richard McBride	50,423	59.65	39 / 42	▲1	1st	Majority
1916	William John Bowser	72,842	40.52	9 / 47	▼30	▼2nd	Opposition
1920	William John Bowser	110,475	31.20	15 / 47	▲6	2nd	Opposition
1924	William John Bowser	101,765	29.45	17 / 48	▲2	2nd	Opposition
1928	Simon Fraser Tolmie	192,867	53.30	35 / 48	▲18	▲1st	Majority
1933	Simon Fraser Tolmie	Did not contest		0 / 47	▼35	N/A	No seats
1937	Frank Porter Patterson	119,521	28.60	8 / 48	▲8	▲2nd	Opposition
1941	Royal Lethington Maitland	140,282	30.91	12 / 48	▲4	▼3rd	Coalition (Note: After the election, a coalition government was formed by the Conservative and Liberal members. T. D. Patullo, Liberal leader, objected, stepped down, and sat as a Liberal, giving the Coalition 32 seats.)
1945 (Note: In the 1945 and 1949 elections, the Liberal Party ran in coalition with the Conservative Party. Results compared to Liberal and Conservative total from previous election.)	Royal Lethington Maitland	261,147	55.83	37 / 48	N/A	1st	Majority
1949	Herbert Anscomb	428,773	61.35	39 / 48	▲2	1st	Majority
1952 (Note: The 1952 and 1953 elections used the alternative voting system. Rather than marking the ballot with an X, numbers were to be placed opposite the names in order of choice. If, after the first count, no candidate received an absolute simple majority, the candidate with the fewest votes was dropped, and the second choices distributed among the remaining candidates. This process continued until a candidate emerged with the requisite majority vote. Some voters only indicated a first choice (plumping), and others did not utilize the full range available. Consequently, as the counts progressed, some ballots would be exhausted and total valid votes would decline, thereby reducing the absolute majority required to be elected. In multi-member ridings, there were as many ballots as members to be elected, distinguished by colour and letters.)	Herbert Anscomb	129,439 (Note: Election was held under instant-runoff voting; the final popular vote count was 65,285.)	16.84 (Note: Election was held under instant-runoff voting; the final popular vote percent was 9.66%.)	4 / 48	N/A	▼4th	Fourth party
1953	Deane Finlayson	40,780 (Note: Election was held under instant-runoff voting; the final popular vote count was 7,326.)	5.60 (Note: Election was held under instant-runoff voting; the final popular vote percent was 1.11%.)	1 / 48	▼3	4th	No status
1956	Deane Finlayson	25,373	3.11	0 / 52	▼1	4th	No seats
1960	Deane Finlayson	66,943	6.72	0 / 52	0	4th	No seats
1963	Davie Fulton	109,090	11.27	0 / 52	0	4th	No seats
1966	Vacant	1,409	0.18	0 / 55	0	4th	No seats
1969	John de Wolf	1,087	0.11	0 / 55	0	4th	No seats
1972	Derril Thomas Warren	143,450	12.67	2 / 55	▲2	4th	Fourth party
1975	George Scott Wallace	49,796	3.86	1 / 55	▼1	4th	No status
1979	Victor Stephens	71,078	5.06	0 / 57	▼1	▲3rd	No seats
1983	Brian Westwood	19,131	1.16	0 / 57	0	▼4th	No seats
1986	Vacant	14,074	0.73	0 / 69	0	4th	No seats
1991	Peter B. Macdonald	426	0.03	0 / 75	0	▼9th	No seats
1996	Peter B. Macdonald	1,002	0.06	0 / 75	0	▼10th	No seats
2001	Susan Power	2,417	0.15	0 / 79	0	▲8th	No seats
2005	Barry Chilton	9,623	0.55	0 / 79	0	▲7th	No seats
2009	Wilf Hanni	34,451	2.10	0 / 85	0	▲4th	No seats
2013	John Cummins	85,783	4.76	0 / 85	0	4th	No seats
2017	Vacant	10,421	0.53	0 / 87	0	4th	No seats
2020	Trevor Bolin	35,902	1.91	0 / 87	0	4th	No seats
2024	John Rustad	910,180	43.27	44 / 93	▲44	▲2nd	Opposition
2026	Lorne Doerkson (interim)	928,019	47.71	64 / 93	▲28	▲1st	Majority

== See also ==
- 2023 Conservative Party of British Columbia leadership election
- 2026 Conservative Party of British Columbia leadership election
- List of political parties in Canada § British Columbia
- List of British Columbia premiers
- List of British Columbia general elections
