= 1975 British Columbia general election =

Canadian provincial election

- December 11, 1975

55 seats of the Legislative Assembly of British Columbia 28 seats were needed for a majority
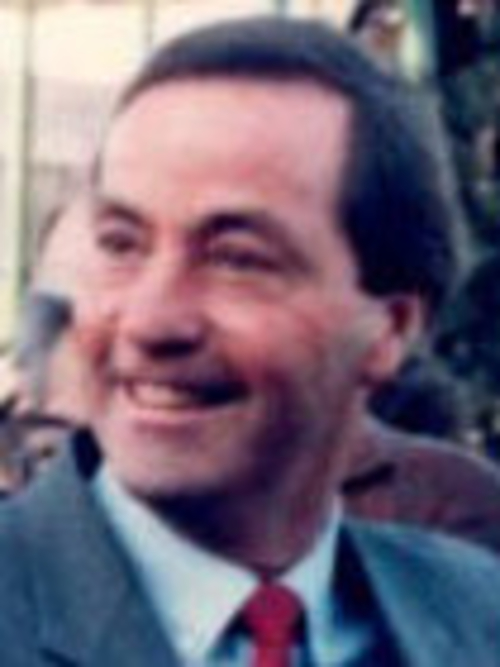

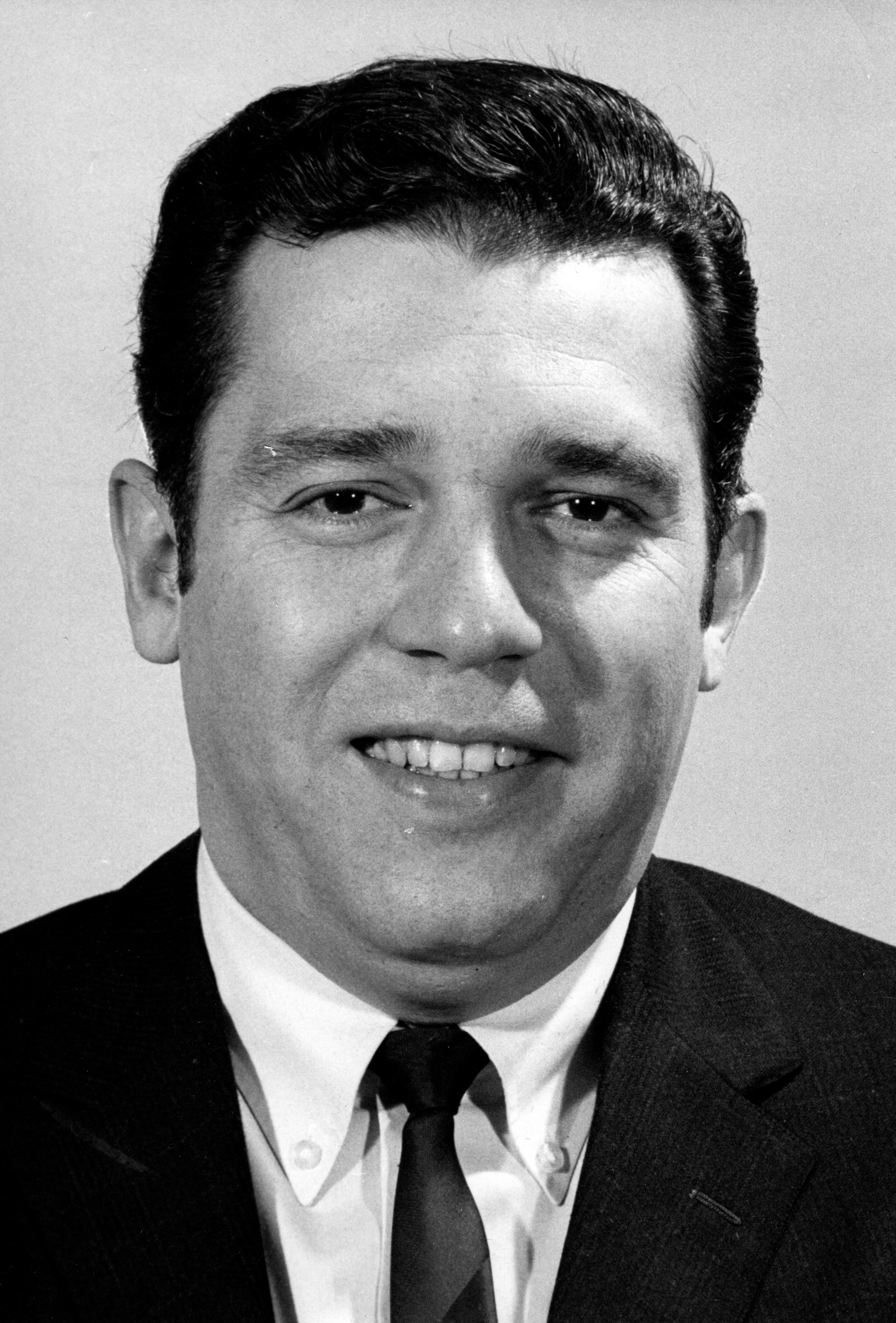
	First party	Second party
Leader	Bill Bennett	Dave Barrett
Party	Social Credit	New Democratic
Leader since	1973	1969
Leader's seat	South Okanagan	Coquitlam (lost re-election)
Last election	10 seats, 31.16%	38 seats, 39.59%
Seats won	35	18
Seat change	▲25	▼20
Popular vote	635,482	505,396
Percentage	49.25%	39.16%
Swing	▲18.09	▼0.43
	Third party	Fourth party
	BCLP	PC
Leader	Gordon Gibson	George Scott Wallace
Party	Liberal	Progressive Conservative
Leader since	1975	1973
Leader's seat	North Vancouver-Capilano	Oak Bay
Last election	5 seats, 16.40%	2 seats, 12.67%
Seats won	1	1
Seat change	▼4	▼1
Popular vote	93,397	49,796
Percentage	7.24%	3.86%
Swing	▼9.16	▼8.81
Premier before election
Dave Barrett
New Democratic
Premier after election
Bill Bennett
Social Credit

The 1975 British Columbia general election was the 31st general election in the Province of British Columbia, Canada. It was held to elect members of the Legislative Assembly of British Columbia. The election was called on November 3, 1975, and held on December 11, 1975. The new legislature met for the first time on March 17, 1976.

The governing New Democratic Party of Dave Barrett was defeated after three years in government. Bill Bennett, son of long-time Social Credit Party leader and BC premier, W.A.C. Bennett, led Social Credit back to power, winning close to half of the popular vote, and a solid majority in the legislature.

Voters abandoned the Liberal and Progressive Conservative parties as the centre and right-wing vote coalesced around Social Credit. The defeated social democratic NDP suffered only a marginal decrease in its vote share. However, NDP support outside Vancouver tailed off, resulting in a 20-seat loss. Barrett was one of the casualties; he was narrowly defeated by a Socred challenger (though he returned to the legislature a few months later in a by-election).

This was the last election until 2024 that the Conservative Party won a seat.

== Results ==
Summary of the 1975 Legislative Assembly of British Columbia election results
Party	Party leader	# of candidates	Seats			Popular vote		
Party	Party leader	# of candidates	1972	Elected	% Change	#	%	% Change
Social Credit	Bill Bennett	55	10	35	+250%	635,482	49.25%	+18.09%
New Democratic	Dave Barrett	55	38	18	-52.6%	505,396	39.16%	-0.43%
Liberal	Gordon Gibson	49	5	1	-80.0%	93,379	7.24%	-9.16%
Progressive Conservative	George Scott Wallace	29	2	1	-50.0%	49,796	3.86%	-8.81%
Independent		12	-	-	-	4,688	0.36%	+0.26%
Communist		13	-	-	-	1,441	0.11%	+0.03%
North American Labour		4	*	-	*	141	0.01%	*
Revolutionary Marxist Group		3	*	-	*	94	0.01%	*
League for Socialist Action		1	*	-	*	34	x	*
Total		221	55	55	-	1,290,451	100%	

Notes:

* Party did not nominate candidates in the previous election.

x - less than 0.005% of the popular vote

Popular vote
Social Credit	49.25%
NDP	39.16%
Liberal	7.24%
PC	3.86%
Others	0.49%

Seats summary
Social Credit	63.64%
NDP	32.73%
Liberal	1.82%
PC	1.82%

== See also ==
- List of British Columbia political parties
