= 1972 British Columbia general election =

Canadian provincial election

- August 30, 1972

55 seats to the 30th Legislative Assembly of British Columbia 28 seats were needed for a majority
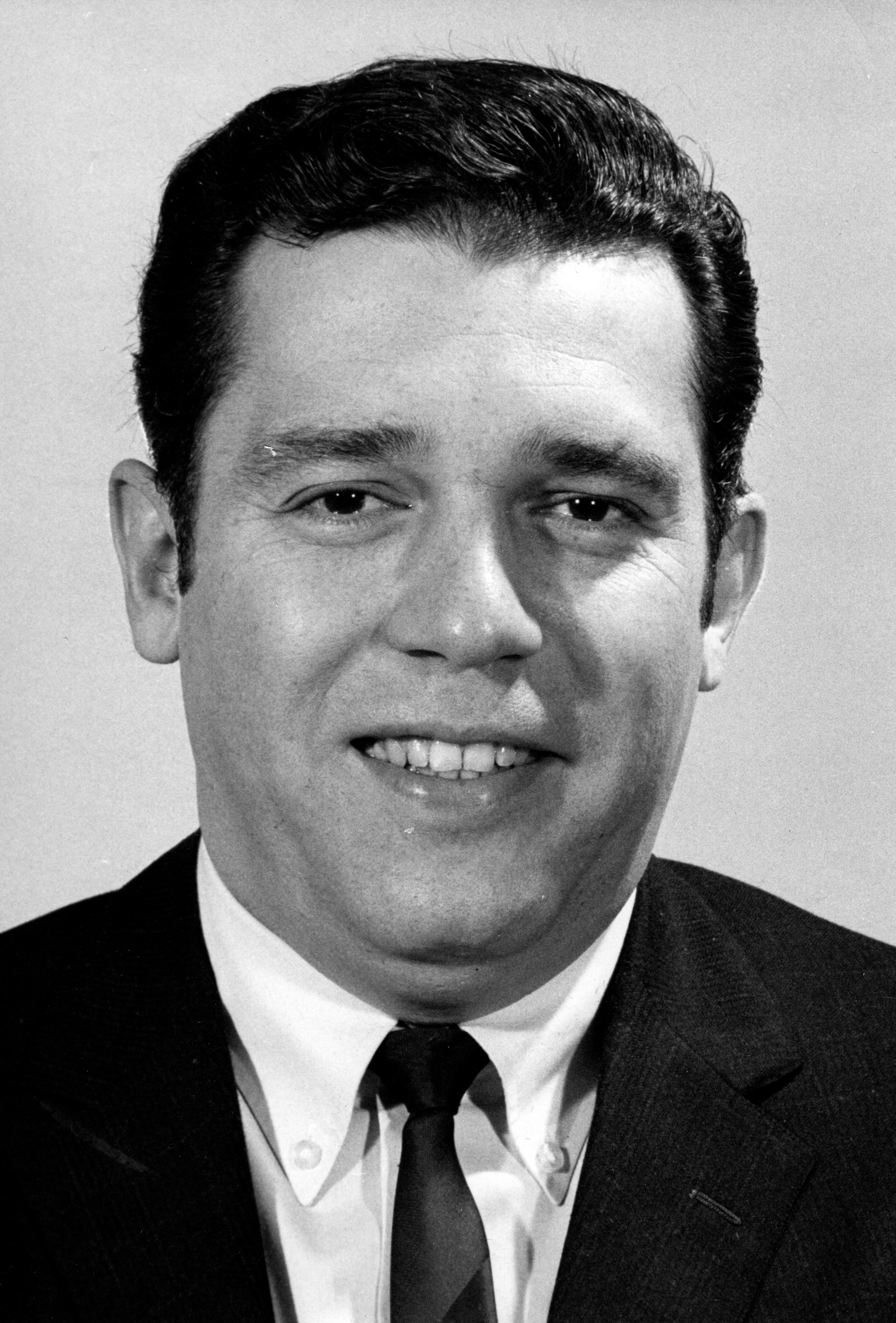

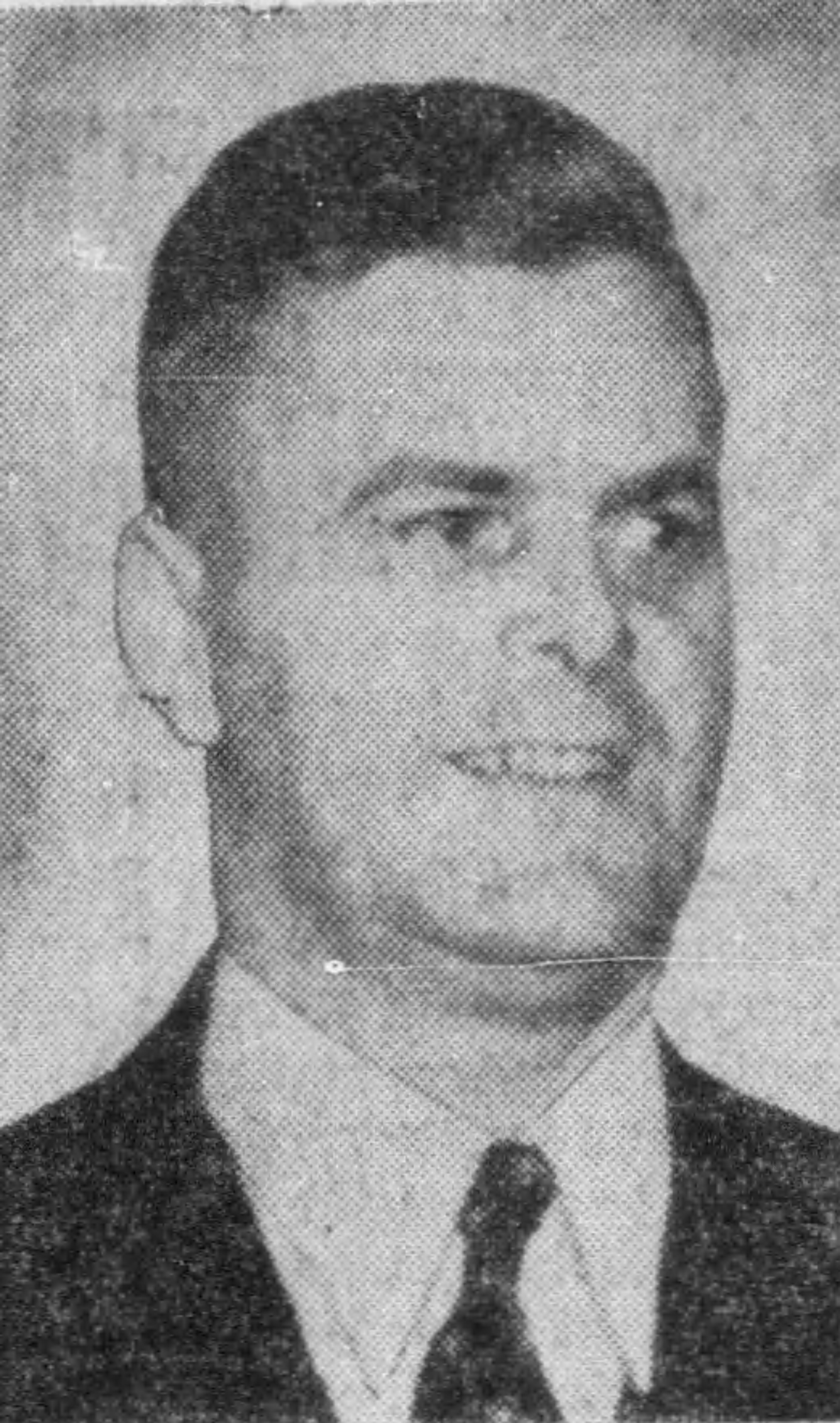

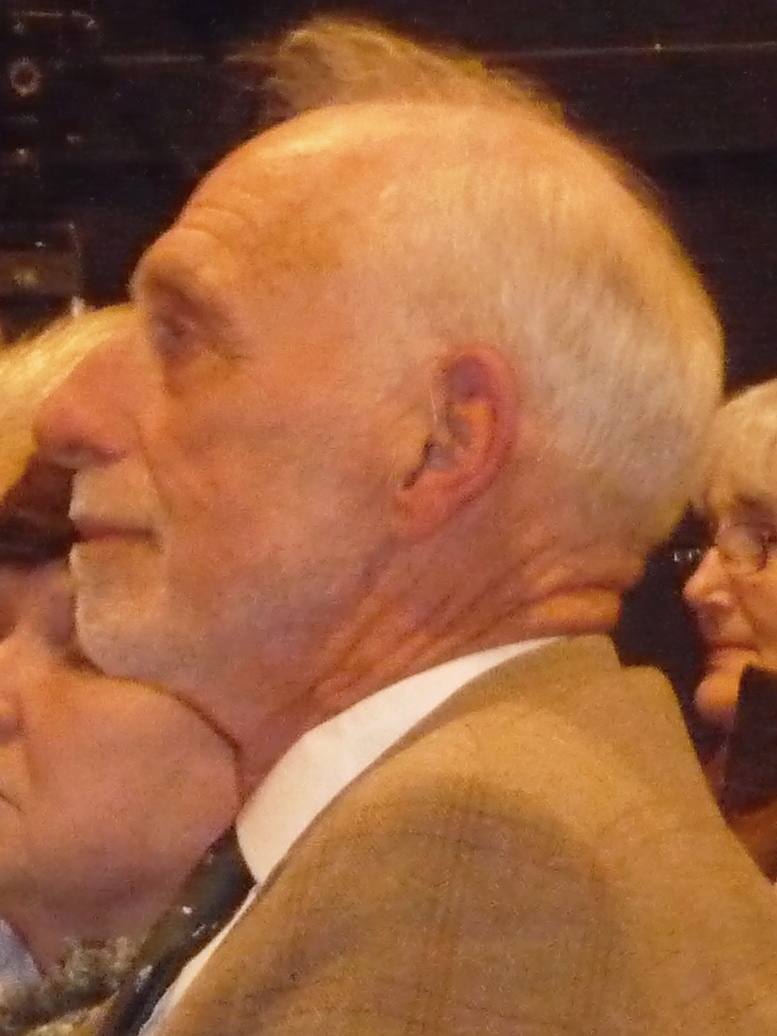
	First party	Second party
Leader	Dave Barrett	W. A. C. Bennett
Party	New Democratic	Social Credit
Leader since	1969	1952
Leader's seat	Coquitlam	South Okanagan
Last election	12 seats, 33.92%	38 seats, 46.79%
Seats won	38	10
Seat change	▲26	▼28
Popular vote	448,260	352,776
Percentage	39.59%	31.16%
Swing	▲5.67pp	▼15.63pp
	Third party	Fourth party
		PC
Leader	David Anderson	Derril Thomas Warren
Party	Liberal	Progressive Conservative
Leader since	1972	1971
Leader's seat	Victoria (Note: Not the incumbent, but stood in this seat and won)	Ran in North Vancouver-Seymour (lost)
Last election	5 seats, 19.03%	0 seats, 0.11%
Seats won	5	2
Seat change	0	▲2
Popular vote	185,640	143,450
Percentage	16.40%	12.67%
Swing	▼2.63pp	▲12.56pp
Premier before election
W. A. C. Bennett
Social Credit
Premier after election
Dave Barrett
New Democratic

The 1972 British Columbia general election for the Canadian province of British Columbia was held to elect members of the Legislative Assembly of British Columbia. The election was called on July 24, 1972, and held on August 30, 1972. The new legislature met for the first time on October 17, 1972. David Barrett led the social democratic New Democratic Party to victory, winning a majority government.

The Social Credit Party, led by Premier W. A. C. Bennett, were defeated after governing British Columbia since the 1952 election. Social Credit's share of the popular vote fell by over 15 percentage points, and the party lost 28 of the seats it had won in the previous election.

The Liberal Party held onto its five seats, while the Progressive Conservative Party, under the leadership of Derrill Warren, returned to the legislature for the first time since the 1953 election by winning two seats.

In four ridings and part of a fifth, a referendum was held on the question of daylight saving time and which time zone to use concurrently with the election.

Social Credit ran a lackluster campaign beset by gaffes. A week before the general election, cabinet minister Phil Gaglardi remarked to a newspaper that Bennett would resign after the election, calling him "an old man who doesn't understand what is happening with the young people of this province". The remark proved damaging, bringing the issue of whether Bennett and his party were worn out after 20 years in office to the forefront of the campaign. A pre-campaign visit by Bennett and his cabinet to New Westminster turned violent after they were confronted by demonstrators, who injured eight ministers, a melee for which Bennett tried to blame Barrett. Shortly after the Social Credit campaign started, Bennett was tricked into shaking hands with current Progressive Conservative leader Derril Warren in front of a photographer from The Province. After the photograph, depicting a smiling Warren and scowling Bennett, was published on The Province's front page, Bennett spent the rest of the campaign antagonising the media, refusing to tell reporters where he was appearing.

The media sharply contrasted the aged Bennett with the youthful Barrett. Bennett had won his first election in 1941, while Barrett was in grade school, and looked and sounded older than his 72 years. Barrett ran a campaign focused on "people issues" such as urban transit, public auto insurance, and increased royalties from the province's timber and minerals industries. Late in the campaign, Bennett declared at a Social Credit rally, "The socialist hordes are at the gates of British Columbia!"

Despite the lacklustre Socred campaign, no commentators anticipated the NDP winning a solid majority. Social Credit lost over half of its seats, leading historian David J. Mitchell to write, "The surprise was not just [the Social Credit] defeat, but its magnitude." In his victory speech, Barrett told supporters that ten thousand people had worked for 40 years to get the NDP and its predecessor, the Co-operative Commonwealth Federation, elected into office, and vowed, "I will not let their hopes or aspirations down."

== Results ==
Summary of the 1972 Legislative Assembly of British Columbia election results
Party	Party leader	# of candidates	Seats			Popular vote		
Party	Party leader	# of candidates	1969	Elected	% Change	#	%	% Change
New Democratic	Dave Barrett	55	12	38	+217%	448,260	39.59%	+5.67%
Social Credit	W. A. C. Bennett	55	38	10	-73.7%	352,776	31.16%	-15.63%
Liberal	David Anderson	53	5	5	-	185,640	16.40%	-2.63%
Progressive Conservative	Derril Thomas Warren	49	-	2	-	143,450	12.67%	+12.56%
Independent		9	-	-	-	1,184	0.10%	+0.02%
Communist Party		15	-	-	-	862	0.08%	+0.03%
Total		226	55	55	-	1,132,172	100%	

Popular vote
NDP	39.59%
Social Credit	31.16%
Liberal	16.40%
PC	12.67%
Others	0.18%

Seats summary
NDP	69.09%
Social Credit	18.18%
Liberal	9.09%
PC	3.64%

== See also ==
- List of British Columbia political parties
