= 1969 British Columbia general election =

Canadian provincial election

← 1966	August 27, 1969	1972 →

55 seats of the Legislative Assembly of British Columbia 28 seats were needed for a majority
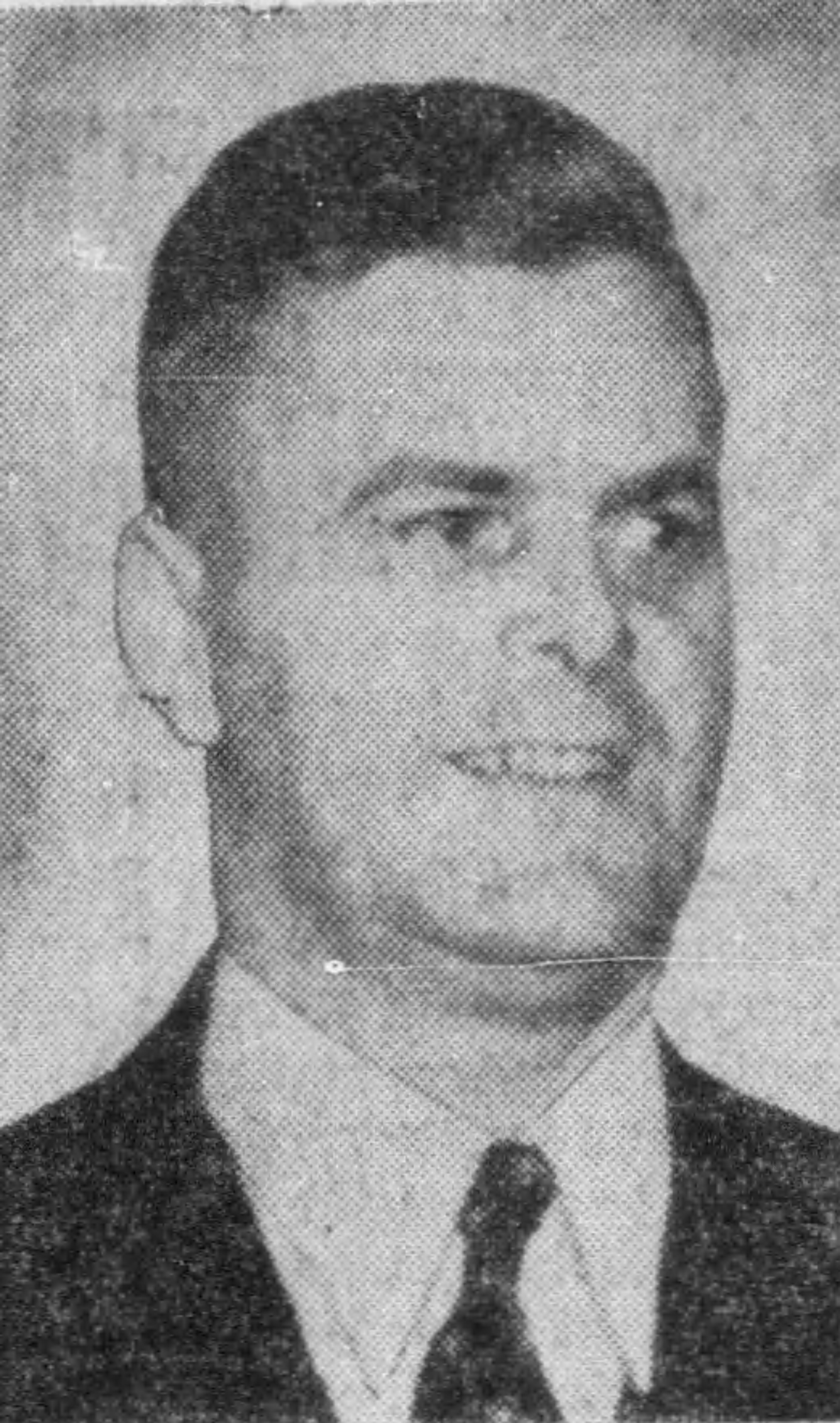

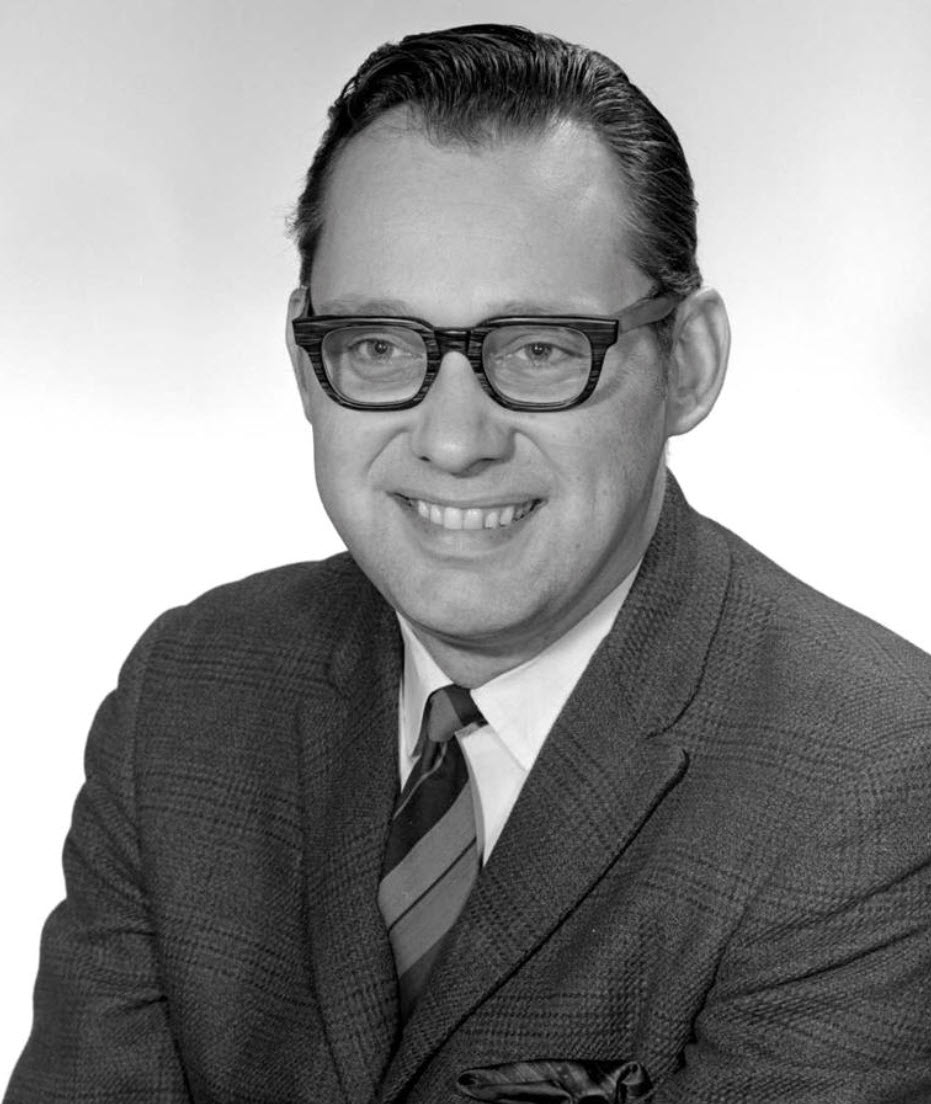
	First party	Second party	Third party
			BCLP
Leader	W. A. C. Bennett	Thomas R. Berger	Pat McGeer
Party	Social Credit	New Democratic	Liberal
Leader since	1952	1969	1968
Leader's seat	South Okanagan	Vancouver-Burrard (lost re-election)	Vancouver-Point Grey
Last election	33 seats, 45.59%	16 seats, 33.62%	6 seats, 20.24%
Seats won	38	12	5
Seat change	▲5	▼4	▼1
Popular vote	457,777	331,813	186,235
Percentage	46.79%	33.92%	19.03%
Swing	▲1.20pp	▲0.30pp	▼1.21pp
Premier before election
W. A. C. Bennett
Social Credit
Premier after election
W. A. C. Bennett
Social Credit

The 1969 British Columbia general election was the 29th general election in the Province of British Columbia, Canada. It was held to elect members of the Legislative Assembly of British Columbia. The election was called on July 21, 1969, and held on August 27, 1969. The new legislature met for the first time on January 22, 1970.

The conservative Social Credit Party of British Columbia was re-elected with a majority in the legislature to a seventh term in government. It won over 46% of the popular vote.

The opposition New Democratic Party of British Columbia won about one-third of the popular vote, roughly the same as in the previous election, but lost four of its 16 seats in the legislature.

The Liberal Party of British Columbia lost one of its six seats.

== Results ==
Party	Party leader	# of candidates	Seats			Popular vote		
Party	Party leader	# of candidates	1966	Elected	% Change	#	%	% Change
Social Credit	W.A.C. Bennett	55	33	38	+15.2%	457,777	46.79%	+1.20%
New Democrats	Tom Berger	55	16	12	-25.0%	331,813	33.92%	+0.30%
Liberal	Patrick Lucey McGeer	55	6	5	-16.7%	186,235	19.03%	-1.21%
Progressive Conservative	John de Wolf	1	-	-	-	1,087	0.11%	-0.07%
Independent		6	-	-	-	831	0.08%	-0.15%
Communist		4	-	-	-	482	0.05%	-0.09%
Social Conservative		1	*	-	*	131	0.01%	*
Total		177	55	55	-	978,356	100%	

Note:

* Party did not nominate candidates in the previous election.

Popular vote
Social Credit	46.79%
NDP	33.92%
Liberal	19.03%
PC	0.11%
Others	0.15%

Seats summary
Social Credit	69.09%
NDP	21.82%
Liberal	9.09%

== See also ==
- List of British Columbia political parties
