= 27th Parliament of British Columbia =

The 27th Legislative Assembly of British Columbia sat from 1964 to 1966. The members were elected in the British Columbia general election held in September 1963. The Social Credit Party led by W. A. C. Bennett formed the government. The New Democratic Party (NDP) led by Robert Strachan formed the official opposition.

William Harvey Murray served as speaker for the assembly.

== Members of the 27th Parliament ==
The following members were elected to the assembly in 1963:

Member	Electoral district	Party	First elected / previously elected	No.# of term(s)
Stanley John Squire	Alberni	NDP	1952	5th term
Frank Arthur Calder	Atlin	NDP	1949, 1960	5th term*
Gordon Dowding	Burnaby	NDP	1956	3rd term
Charles Willoughby MacSorley	Burnaby	Social Credit	1963	1st term
William Collins Speare	Cariboo	Social Credit	1957	3rd term
William Kenneth Kiernan	Chilliwack	Social Credit	1952	5th term
James Roland Chabot	Columbia	Social Credit	1963	1st term
Daniel Robert John Campbell	Comox	Social Credit	1956	3rd term
Robert Martin Strachan	Cowichan-Newcastle	NDP	1952	5th term
Leo Thomas Nimsick	Cranbrook	NDP	1949	6th term
Ernest A. LeCours	Delta	Social Credit	1963	1st term
Hunter Bertram Vogel	Delta	Social Credit	1963	1st term
David Barrett	Dewdney	NDP	1960	2nd term
Herbert Joseph Bruch	Esquimalt	Social Credit	1953	4th term
Henry Cartmell (Harry) McKay	Fernie	Liberal	1960	2nd term
Ray Gillis Williston	Fort George	Social Credit	1953	4th term
Lois Mabel Haggen	Grand Forks-Greenwood	NDP	1956	3rd term
Philip Arthur Gaglardi	Kamloops	Social Credit	1952	5th term
Randolph Harding	Kaslo-Slocan	NDP	1945	7th term
Donald Frederick Robinson	Lillooet	Social Credit	1955	4th term
Anthony John Gargrave	Mackenzie	NDP	1952	5th term
David Daniel Stupich	Nanaimo and the Islands	NDP	1963	1st term
Wesley Drewett Black	Nelson-Creston	Social Credit	1952	5th term
John McRae (Rae) Eddie	New Westminster	NDP	1952	5th term
George William McLeod	North Okanagan	Social Credit	1963	1st term
Jacob Francis Huhn	North Peace River	Social Credit	1960	2nd term
James Gordon Gibson	North Vancouver	Liberal	1953, (Note: Lillooet) 1960	3rd term*
Raymond Joseph Perrault	North Vancouver	Liberal	1960	2nd term
Alan Brock MacFarlane	Oak Bay	Liberal	1960	2nd term
Cyril Morley Shelford	Omineca	Social Credit	1952	5th term
William Harvey Murray	Prince Rupert	Social Credit	1956	3rd term
Arvid Lundell	Revelstoke	Social Credit	1949, (Note: First elected as a Conservative) 1956, 1963	3rd term*
Donald Leslie Brothers	Rossland-Trail	Social Credit	1958	3rd term
John Douglas Tidball Tisdalle	Saanich	Social Credit	1953	4th term
Willis Franklin Jefcoat	Salmon Arm	Social Credit	1960	2nd term
Francis Xavier Richter	Similkameen	Social Credit	1953	4th term
Dudley George Little	Skeena	Social Credit	1960	2nd term
William Andrew Cecil Bennett	South Okanagan	Social Credit	1941, 1949	8th term*
Stanley Carnell	South Peace River	Social Credit	1956	3rd term
Eric Charles Fitzgerald Martin	Vancouver-Burrard	Social Credit	1952	5th term
Bert Price	Vancouver-Burrard	Social Credit	1952	5th term
Alexander Small Matthew	Vancouver Centre	Social Credit	1953	4th term
Leslie Raymond Peterson	Vancouver Centre	Social Credit	1956	4th term
Alexander Barrett MacDonald	Vancouver East	NDP	1960	2nd term
Arthur James Turner	Vancouver East	NDP	1941	8th term
Robert William Bonner	Vancouver-Point Grey	Social Credit	1952	5th term
Ralph Raymond Loffmark	Vancouver-Point Grey	Social Credit	1963	1st term
Patrick Lucey McGeer	Vancouver-Point Grey	Liberal	1962	2nd term
William Neelands Chant	Victoria City	Social Credit	1953	4th term
Waldo McTavish Skillings	Victoria City	Social Credit	1960	2nd term
John Donald Smith	Victoria City	Social Credit	1956	3rd term
William Leonard Hartley	Yale	NDP	1963	1st term

== Party standings ==
Affiliation	Members
Social Credit	33
New Democratic	14
Liberal	5
Total	52
Government Majority	14

== By-elections ==
None.

== Other changes ==
- North Okanagan (dec. George William McLeod December 1965)
