= 33rd Parliament of British Columbia =

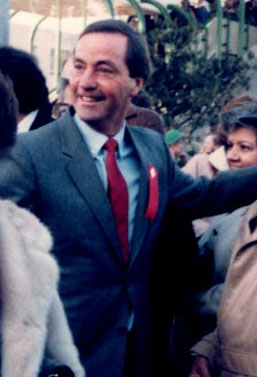
Bill Bennett, 1985

The 33rd Legislative Assembly of British Columbia sat from 1983 to 1986. The members were elected in the British Columbia general election held in May 1983. The Social Credit Party led by Bill Bennett formed the government. After Bennett retired in 1986, Bill Vander Zalm became Premier. The New Democratic Party (NDP) led by Dave Barrett formed the official opposition. After Barrett resigned his seat in 1984, Bob Skelly became party leader.

Kenneth Walter Davidson served as speaker for the assembly.

== Members of the 33rd Parliament ==
The following members were elected to the assembly in 1983:

Member	Electoral district	Party	First elected / previously elected	No.# of term(s)
Robert Evans Skelly	Alberni	NDP	1972	4th term
Al Passarell	Atlin	NDP	1979	2nd term
Al Passarell	Atlin	Social Credit	1979	2nd term
James J. (Jim) Hewitt	Boundary-Similkameen	Social Credit	1975	3rd term
Rosemary Brown	Burnaby-Edmonds	NDP	1972	4th term
Eileen Dailly	Burnaby North	NDP	1966	6th term
Elwood Neal Veitch	Burnaby-Willingdon	Social Credit	1975, 1983	2nd term*
Alexander Vaughan Fraser	Cariboo	Social Credit	1969	5th term
William Samuel (Bill) Ritchie	Central Fraser Valley	Social Credit	1979	2nd term
Harvey Schroeder	Chilliwack	Social Credit	1972	4th term
James Roland Chabot	Columbia River	Social Credit	1963	7th term
Karen Elizabeth Sanford	Comox	NDP	1972	4th term
Mark Willson Rose	Coquitlam-Moody	NDP	1983	1st term
Barbara Brookman Wallace	Cowichan-Malahat	NDP	1975	3rd term
Kenneth Walter Davidson	Delta	Social Credit	1975	3rd term
Forbes Charles Austin Pelton	Dewdney	Social Credit	1983	1st term
Frank Mitchell	Esquimalt-Port Renfrew	NDP	1951, 1979	4th term*
Claude Harry Richmond	Kamloops	Social Credit	1981	2nd term
Terence Patrick Segarty	Kootenay	Social Credit	1979	2nd term
Robert Howard McClelland	Langley	Social Credit	1972	4th term
Don Lockstead	Mackenzie	NDP	1972	4th term
John Michael Parks	Maillardville-Coquitlam	Social Credit	1983	1st term
David Daniel Stupich	Nanaimo	NDP	1963, 1972	6th term*
Lorne Nicolson	Nelson-Creston	NDP	1972	4th term
Dennis Geoffrey Cocke	New Westminster	NDP	1969	5th term
Colin Stuart Gabelmann	North Island	NDP	1972, (Note: North Vancouver-Seymour) 1979	3rd term*
Anthony Julius (Tony) Brummet	North Peace River	Social Credit	1979	2nd term
Angus Creelman Ree	North Vancouver-Capilano	Social Credit	1979	2nd term
John (Jack) Davis	North Vancouver-Seymour	Social Credit	1975	3rd term
Brian Ray Douglas Smith	Oak Bay-Gordon Head	Social Credit	1979	2nd term
Donald James Campbell	Okanagan North	Social Credit	1983	1st term
Lyle MacWilliam (1984)	Okanagan North	NDP	1984	1st term
William Richards Bennett	Okanagan South	Social Credit	1973	4th term
Jack Joseph Kempf	Omineca	Social Credit	1975	3rd term
John Herbert (Jack) Heinrich	Prince George North	Social Credit	1979	2nd term
William Bruce Strachan	Prince George South	Social Credit	1979	2nd term
Graham Lea	Prince Rupert	NDP	1972	4th term
Graham Lea	Prince Rupert	Independent	1972	4th term
Graham Lea	Prince Rupert	United Party	1972	4th term
Graham Lea	Prince Rupert	Progressive Conservative	1972	4th term
James Arthur Nielsen	Richmond	Social Credit	1975	3rd term
Christopher D'Arcy	Rossland-Trail	NDP	1972	4th term
Hugh Austin Curtis	Saanich and the Islands	Social Credit (Note: First elected as a Progressive Conservative)	1972	4th term
Michael C. Clifford	Shuswap-Revelstoke	Social Credit	1983	1st term
Frank Howard	Skeena	NDP	1953, 1979	3rd term*
Donald McGray Phillips	South Peace River	Social Credit	1966, 1972	5th term*
Rita Margaret Johnston	Surrey	Social Credit	1983	1st term
William Earl (Bill) Reid	Surrey	Social Credit	1983	1st term
Emery Oakland Barnes	Vancouver Centre	NDP	1972	4th term
Gary Lauk	Vancouver Centre	NDP	1972	4th term
David Barrett	Vancouver East	NDP	1960, (Note: Dewdney) 1976	8th term*
Alexander Barrett MacDonald	Vancouver East	NDP	1960	8th term
Robert Arthur Williams (1984)	Vancouver East	NDP	1966, 1984	5th term*
Grace Mary McCarthy	Vancouver-Little Mountain	Social Credit	1966, 1975	5th term*
Douglas Lyle Mowat	Vancouver-Little Mountain	Social Credit	1983	1st term
Garde Basil Gardom	Vancouver-Point Grey	Social Credit	1966 (Note: First elected as a Liberal)	6th term
Patrick Lucey McGeer	Vancouver-Point Grey	Social Credit	1962	8th term
Russell Gordon Fraser	Vancouver South	Social Credit	1983	1st term
Charles Stephen Rogers	Vancouver South	Social Credit	1975	3rd term
Robin Kyle Blencoe	Victoria	NDP	1983	1st term
Gordon William Hanson	Victoria	NDP	1979	2nd term
John Douglas Reynolds	West Vancouver-Howe Sound	Social Credit	1983	1st term
Thomas Manville Waterland	Yale-Lillooet	Social Credit	1975	3rd term

== Party standings ==
Affiliation	Members
Social Credit	35
New Democratic Party	22
Total	57
Government Majority	13

== By-elections ==
By-elections were held to replace members for various reasons:

Electoral district	Member elected	Party	Election date	Reason
Okanagan North	Lyle MacWilliam	New Democratic Party	November 8, 1984	Death of D.J. Campbell June 10, 1984
Vancouver East	Robert Arthur Williams	New Democratic Party	November 8, 1984	D. Barrett resigned June 1, 1984, to become a talk show host

== Other changes ==
- Graham Lea becomes an Independent on June 20, 1984, and on February 8, 1985, he forms the United Party. He dissolves the United Party to join the Progressive Conservatives on March 26, 1986.
- Al Passarell joins Social Credit on October 22, 1985.
- South Peace River (res. Donald McGray Phillips April 28, 1986.)
- Yale-Lillooet (res. Thomas Manville Waterland August 5, 1986.)
- Langley (res. Robert Howard McClelland August 7, 1986.)
