= 1966 British Columbia general election =

Canadian provincial election

- September 12, 1966

55 seats of the Legislative Assembly of British Columbia 28 seats were needed for a majority
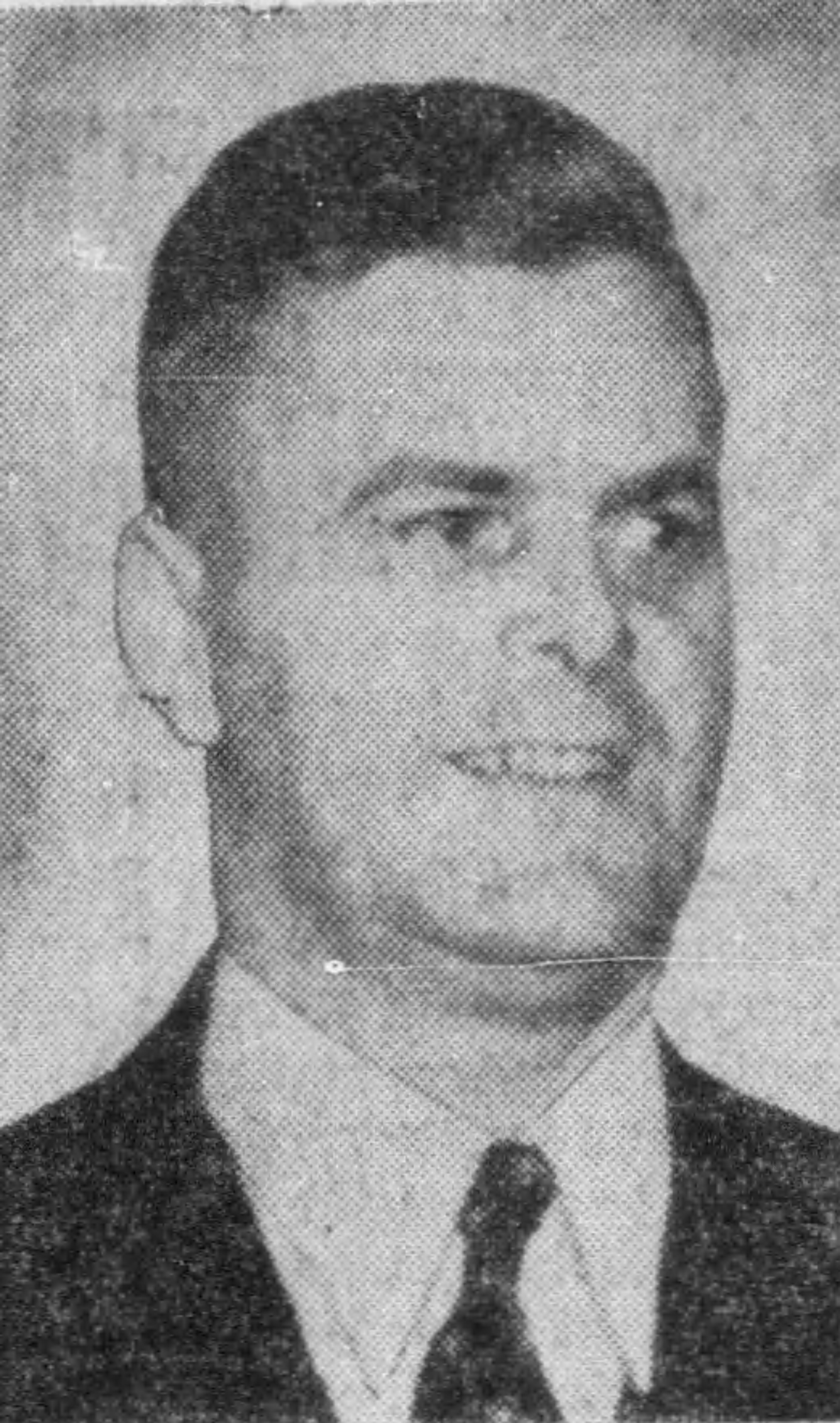

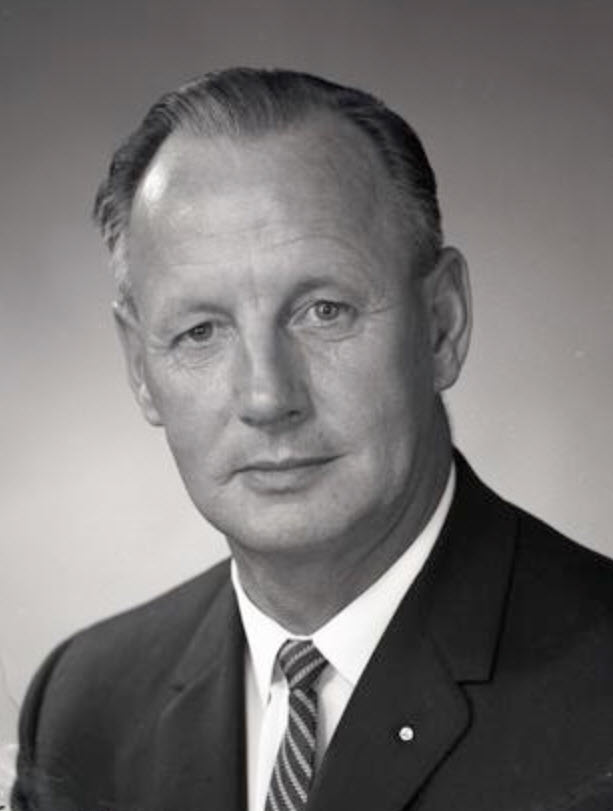
	First party	Second party	Third party
			BCLP
Leader	W. A. C. Bennett	Robert Strachan	Ray Perrault
Party	Social Credit	New Democratic	Liberal
Leader since	1952	1956	1959
Leader's seat	South Okanagan	Cowichan-Malahat	North Vancouver-Capilano
Last election	33 seats, 40.83%	14 seats, 27.80%	5 seats, 19.98%
Seats won	33	16	6
Seat change	0	▲2	▲1
Popular vote	342,751	252,753	152,155
Percentage	45.59%	33.62%	20.24%
Swing	▲4.76pp	▲5.82pp	▲0.26pp
Premier before election
W. A. C. Bennett
Social Credit
Premier after election
W. A. C. Bennett
Social Credit

The 1966 British Columbia general election was the 28th general election in the province of British Columbia, Canada. It was held to elect members of the Legislative Assembly of British Columbia. The election was called on August 5, 1966, and held on September 12, 1966. The new legislature met for the first time on January 24, 1967.

The conservative Social Credit Party was re-elected with a majority in the legislature to a sixth term in government. It increased its share of the popular vote by close to five percentage points to over 45%, and winning the same number of seats (33) as in the previous election.

The opposition New Democratic Party also increased its share of the popular vote by over five percentage points, but won only two additional seats.

The Liberal Party won about 20% of the popular vote, and one additional seat, for a total of six.

The Progressive Conservative Party was virtually wiped out: it nominated only three candidates (down from 44 in the previous election), and its share of the popular vote fell from over 11% to a negligible amount.

== 1966 redistribution of ridings ==
An Act was passed in 1966 providing for an increase of seats from 52 to 55, upon the next election. The following changes were made:

Abolished ridings	New ridings
Renaming of districts
Columbia	Columbia River
Salmon Arm	Shuswap
Reduction of multi-member district
Victoria City (3 MLAs)	Victoria City (2 MLAs)
Merger of districts
Cranbrook; Fernie	Kootenay
Grand Forks-Greenwood; Similkameen	Boundary-Similkameen
Kaslo-Slocan; Revelstoke	Revelstoke-Slocan
Lillooet; Yale	Yale-Lillooet
Reorganization of districts
Cowichan-Newcastle; Nanaimo and the Islands; Saanich	Cowichan-Malahat; Nanaimo; Saanich and the Islands
Division of districts
Burnaby (2 MLAs)	Burnaby-Edmonds; Burnaby North; Burnaby-Willingdon
Delta (2 MLAs)	Richmond; Delta; Langley; Surrey
Dewdney	Coquitlam; Dewdney
North Vancouver (2 MLAs)	North Vancouver-Capilano; North Vancouver-Seymour; West Vancouver-Howe Sound
Vancouver-Point Grey (3 MLAs)	Vancouver-Little Mountain (2 MLAs); Vancouver-Point Grey (2 MLAs); Vancouver South (2 MLAs)

== Results ==
Elections to the 28th Legislative Assembly of British Columbia (1966)
Political party	Party leader	MLAs				Votes			
Political party	Party leader	Candidates	1963	1966	±	#	±	%	± (pp)
Social Credit	W.A.C. Bennett	55	33	33	Steady	342,751	52,328▼	45.59	4.76▲
New Democratic	Bob Strachan	55	14	16	2▲	252,753	16,251▼	33.62	5.82▲
Liberal	Ray Perrault	53	5	6	1▲	152,155	41,208▼	20.24	0.26▲
Progressive Conservative		3	–	–	–	1,409	107,681▼	0.18	11.09▼
Communist		6	–	–	–	1,097	248▲	0.14	0.05▲
Independent		6	–	–	–	1,711	1,421▲	0.23	0.20▲
Total		178	52	55		751,876		100.00%	
Rejected ballots						7,056	924▲		
Actual voters who voted						596,716	11,956▼	68.28%	1.43▼
Registered voters						873,927	787▲		

Seats and popular vote by party
Party	Seats	Votes	Change (pp)
█ Social Credit	33 / 55	45.59%	4.76
█ New Democratic	16 / 55	33.62%	5.82
█ Liberal	6 / 55	20.24%	0.26
█ Progressive Conservative	0 / 55	0.18%	-11.09
█ Other	0 / 55	0.37%	0.25

== MLAs elected ==
Single-member districts

Alberni: Howard McDiarmid
Atlin: Frank Calder
Boundary-Similkameen: Frank Richter, Jr.
Burnaby-Edmonds: Gordon Dowding
Burnaby North: Eileen Dailly
Burnaby-Willingdon: Fred Vulliamy
Cariboo: William C. Speare
Chilliwack: William Kenneth Kiernan
Columbia River: James Roland Chabot
Comox: Daniel Campbell
Coquitlam: Dave Barrett
Cowichan-Malahat: Robert Strachan
Delta: Robert Wenman
Dewdney: George Mussallem
Esquimalt: Herbert Joseph Bruch
Fort George: Ray Williston
Kamloops: Phil Gaglardi
Kootenay: Leo Nimsick
Langley: Hunter Vogel
Mackenzie: Isabel Dawson
Nanaimo: David Stupich
Nelson-Creston: Wesley Drewett Black
New Westminster: Rae Eddie
North Okanagan: Patricia Jordan
North Peace River: Dean Smith
North Vancouver-Capilano: Ray Perrault
North Vancouver-Seymour: Barrie Clark
Oak Bay: Alan MacFarlane
Omineca: Cyril Morley Shelford
Prince Rupert: William Harvey Murray
Revelstoke-Slocan: Randolph Harding
Richmond: Ernest A. LeCours
Rossland-Trail: Donald Leslie Brothers
Saanich and the Islands: John Douglas Tisdalle
Shuswap: Willis Franklin Jefcoat
Skeena: Dudley George Little
South Okanagan: W. A. C. Bennett
South Peace River: Donald M. Phillips
Surrey: Ernest Hall
West Vancouver-Howe Sound: Allan Williams
Yale-Lillooet: Bill Hartley

Multi-member districts

Vancouver-Burrard: Thomas Berger
Vancouver-Burrard: Raymond Parkinson
Vancouver Centre: Herb Capozzi
Vancouver Centre: Evan Maurice Wolfe
Vancouver East: Alexander Macdonald
Vancouver East: Arthur James Turner
Vancouver-Little Mountain: Grace McCarthy
Vancouver-Little Mountain: Leslie Peterson
Vancouver-Point Grey: Garde Gardom
Vancouver-Point Grey: Pat McGeer
Vancouver South: Thomas Audley Bate
Vancouver South: Ralph Raymond Loffmark
Victoria City: William Chant
Victoria City: Waldo McTavish Skillings

=== Synopsis of results ===
Results by riding - 1966 British Columbia general election (single-member districts)
Riding	Winning party						Votes						
Name	1963	Party	Votes	Share	Margin #	Margin %	SC	NDP	Lib	PC	Comm	Ind	Total
Alberni	NDP	SC	6,039	55.55%	1,718	15.80%	6,039	4,321	511	–	–	–	10,871
Atlin	NDP	NDP	572	59.71%	311	32.47%	261	572	125	–	–	–	958
Boundary-Similkameen	New	SC	6,547	55.44%	2,878	24.37%	6,547	3,669	1,594	–	–	–	11,810
Burnaby-Edmonds	New	NDP	5,748	48.71%	1,118	9.48%	4,630	5,748	1,423	–	–	–	11,801
Burnaby North	New	NDP	6,984	49.72%	1,879	13.38%	5,105	6,984	1,957	–	–	–	14,046
Burnaby-Willingdon	New	NDP	6,153	44.47%	524	3.78%	5,629	6,153	2,053	–	–	–	13,835
Cariboo	SC	SC	3,830	54.10%	1,300	18.36%	3,830	2,530	719	–	–	–	7,079
Chilliwack	SC	SC	7,703	63.17%	4,622	37.91%	7,703	3,081	1,411	–	–	–	12,195
Columbia River	SC	SC	1,563	58.45%	929	34.74%	1,563	477	634	–	–	–	2,674
Comox	SC	SC	5,449	49.39%	1,140	10.34%	5,449	4,309	1,276	–	–	–	11,033
Coquitlam	New	NDP	9,517	55.20%	3,452	20.02%	6,065	9,517	1,658	–	–	–	17,240
Cowichan-Malahat	New	NDP	5,646	52.08%	1,234	11.38%	4,412	5,646	783	–	–	–	10,841
Delta	New	SC	7,768	46.46%	1,690	10.11%	7,768	6,078	1,954	921	–	–	16,721
Dewdney	NDP	SC	6,507	53.42%	1,979	16.25%	6,507	4,528	1,146	–	–	–	12,181
Esquimalt	SC	SC	6,075	53.35%	2,630	23.10%	6,075	3,445	1,867	–	–	–	11,387
Fort George	SC	SC	6,282	60.42%	3,480	33.47%	6,282	2,802	1,313	–	–	–	10,397
Kamloops	SC	SC	5,753	52.35%	2,516	22.90%	5,753	3,237	2,000	–	–	–	10,990
Kootenay	New	NDP	3,605	40.98%	535	6.09%	3,070	3,605	2,123	–	–	–	8,798
Langley	New	SC	7,206	58.28%	3,307	26.75%	7,206	3,899	1,260	–	–	–	12,365
Mackenzie	NDP	SC	4,945	52.68%	1,359	14.47%	4,945	3,586	855	–	–	–	9,386
Nanaimo	New	NDP	5,625	47.99%	45	0.38%	5,580	5,625	516	–	–	–	11,721
Nelson-Creston	SC	SC	4,683	59.29%	2,359	29.87%	4,683	2,324	892	–	–	–	7,899
New Westminster	NDP	NDP	5,751	44.65%	199	1.54%	5,552	5,751	1,577	–	–	–	12,880
North Okanagan	SC	SC	3,841	48.59%	1,433	18.13%	3,841	1,535	2,408	–	–	121	7,905
North Peace River	SC	SC	1,799	48.44%	1,216	32.74%	1,799	511	565	–	–	839 (Note: Jacob Francis Huhn, previously elected as the Socred incumbent, received 583 votes.)	3,714
North Vancouver-Capilano	New	Lib	6,426	51.49%	2,450	19.63%	3,976	1,816	6,426	261	–	–	12,479
North Vancouver-Seymour	New	Lib	5,301	39.61%	694	5.18%	4,607	3,137	5,301	227	110	–	13,382
Oak Bay	Lib	Lib	8,118	54.48%	2,310	15.51%	5,808	976	8,118	–	–	–	14,902
Omineca	SC	SC	2,337	70.16%	1,343	40.32%	2,337	994	–	–	–	–	3,331
Prince Rupert	SC	SC	2,647	52.90%	834	16.67%	2,647	1,813	544	–	–	–	5,004
Revelstoke-Slocan	New	NDP	2,158	44.67%	138	2.86%	2,020	2,158	548	–	–	105	4,831
Richmond	New	SC	6,521	43.33%	372	2.48%	6,521	6,149	2,381	–	–	–	15,051
Rossland-Trail	SC	SC	5,600	55.93%	3,147	31.43%	5,600	2,453	1,960	–	–	–	10,013
Saanich and the Islands	New	SC	7,237	50.05%	3,416	23.62%	7,237	3,821	3,401	–	–	–	14,459
Shuswap	SC	SC	3,995	54.07%	1,400	18.95%	3,995	2,595	760	–	39	–	7,389
Skeena	SC	SC	3,046	55.39%	1,304	23.71%	3,046	1,742	711	–	–	–	5,499
South Okanagan	SC	SC	8,747	73.15%	6,811	56.96%	8,747	1,936	1,274	–	–	–	11,957
South Peace River	SC	SC	2,585	59.78%	1,697	39.24%	2,585	851	888	–	–	–	4,324
Surrey	New	NDP	7,039	48.20%	785	5.38%	6,254	7,039	1,234	–	77	–	14,604
West Vancouver-Howe Sound	New	Lib	8,346	52.76%	2,847	18.00%	5,499	1,975	8,346	–	–	–	15,820
Yale-Lillooet	New	NDP	3,885	55.37%	754	10.74%	3,131	3,885	–	–	–	–	7,016

= open seat
= turnout is above provincial average
= winning candidate was in previous Legislature
= incumbent had switched allegiance
= previously incumbent in another riding
= not incumbent; was previously elected to the Legislature
= incumbency arose from byelection gain
= other incumbents renominated
= multiple candidates

Results by riding - 1966 British Columbia general election (multiple-member districts)
Riding		Winning party		Votes						
Name	MLAs	1963	1966	SC	NDP	Lib	PC	Comm	Ind	Total
Vancouver-Burrard	2	2	2	7,584	9,849	3,190	–	–	–	40,386
Vancouver-Burrard	2	2	2	7,584	9,498	2,681	–	–	–	40,386
Vancouver Centre	2	2	2	8,157	7,257	4,147	–	253	144	38,570
Vancouver Centre	2	2	2	7,938	6,871	3,803	–	–	–	38,570
Vancouver East	2	2	2	8,644	12,502	1,637	–	377	–	45,521
Vancouver East	2	2	2	8,593	12,185	1,583	–	–	–	45,521
Vancouver-Little Mountain	2	New	2	12,380 (Note: Leslie Peterson was previously MLA in Vancouver Centre)	8,620	4,681	–	–	–	50,040
Vancouver-Little Mountain	2	New	2	11,566	8,523	4,270	–	–	–	50,040
Vancouver-Point Grey	2	2 1	2	11,494	2,934	17,400	–	–	–	57,472
Vancouver-Point Grey	2	2 1	2	9,284	2,853	13,507	–	–	–	57,472
Vancouver South	2	New	2	12,259 (Note: Ralph Raymond Loffmark was previously MLA in Vancouver-Point Grey.)	9,067	5,698	–	–	502	53,784
Vancouver South	2	New	2	11,740 (Note: Thomas Audley Bate was MLA in Vancouver-Point Grey during 1953-1963.)	8,843	5,675	–	–	–	53,784
Victoria City	2	3	2	13,068	5,304	4,774	–	241	–	45,315
Victoria City	2	3	2	12,156	5,175	4,597	–	–	–	45,315

= winning candidate

== See also ==
- List of British Columbia political parties
