= 1963 British Columbia general election =

Canadian provincial election

- September 30, 1963

52 seats of the Legislative Assembly of British Columbia 27 seats were needed for a majority
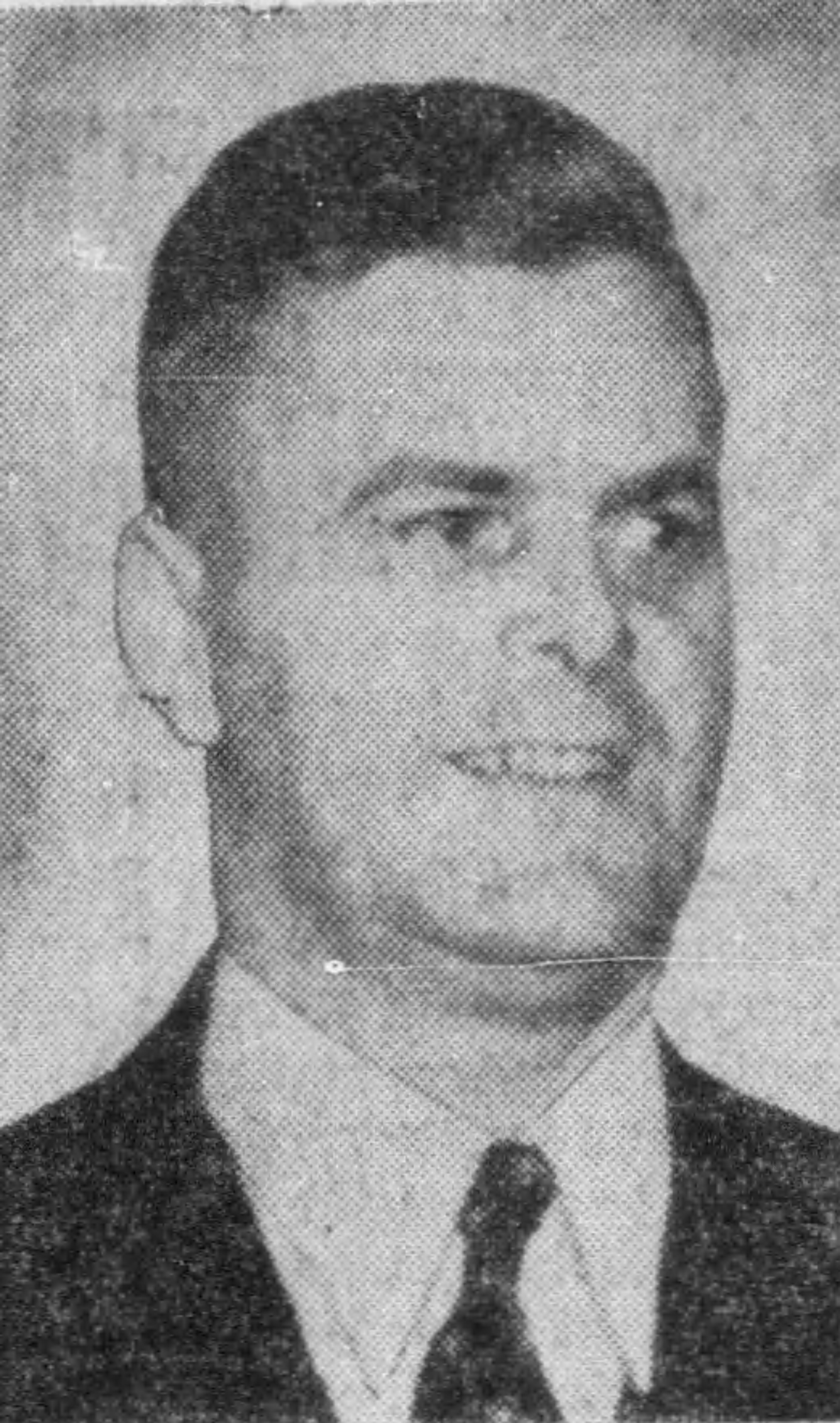

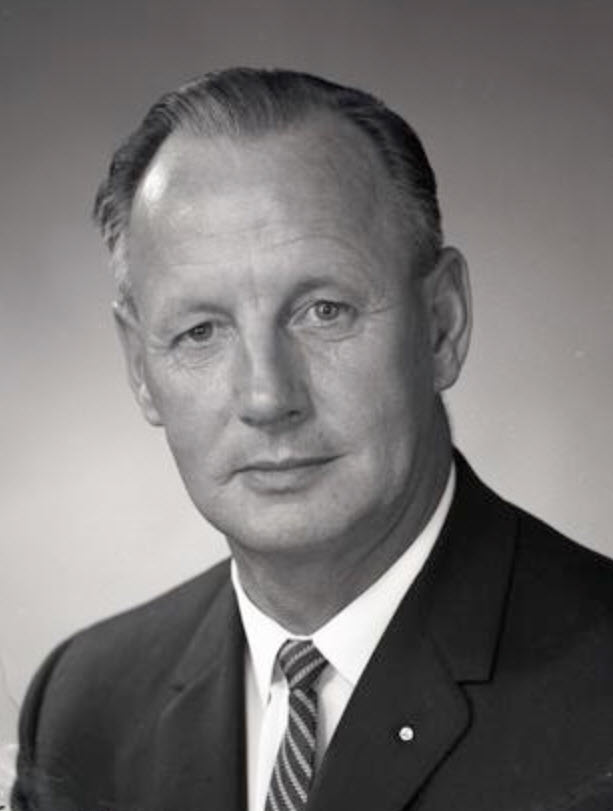

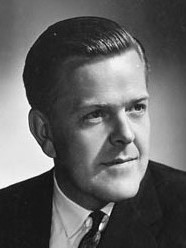
	First party	Second party
Leader	W. A. C. Bennett	Robert Strachan
Party	Social Credit	New Democratic
Leader since	1952	1956
Leader's seat	South Okanagan	Cowichan-Newcastle
Last election	32 seats, 38.83%	16 seats, 32.73%
Seats won	33	14
Seat change	▲1	▼2
Popular vote	395,079	269,004
Percentage	40.83%	27.80%
Swing	▲2.00pp	▼4.93pp
	Third party	Fourth party
	BCLP
Leader	Ray Perrault	Davie Fulton
Party	Liberal	Progressive Conservative
Leader since	1959	1960
Leader's seat	North Vancouver	Ran in Kamloops (lost)
Last election	4 seats, 20.90%	0 seats, 6.72%
Seats won	5	0
Seat change	▲1	0
Popular vote	193,363	109,090
Percentage	19.98%	11.27%
Swing	▼0.92pp	▲4.55pp
Premier before election
W. A. C. Bennett
Social Credit
Premier after election
W. A. C. Bennett
Social Credit

The 1963 British Columbia general election was the 27th general election in the province of British Columbia, Canada. It was held to elect members of the Legislative Assembly of British Columbia. The election was called on August 22, 1963, and held on September 30, 1963. The new legislature met for the first time on January 23, 1964.

The conservative Social Credit Party of Premier W.A.C. Bennett was re-elected with a majority in the legislature to a fifth term in government. The party increased its share of the popular vote and number of seats in the legislature marginally.

The opposition New Democratic Party (formerly the Cooperative Commonwealth Federation) had small losses both in popular vote and number of seats.

The Liberals won about 20% of the popular vote, and one additional seat, for a total of five.

The Progressive Conservative Party won no seats in the legislature, increasing its share of the popular vote by four-and-half percentage points to over 11%.

The Social Credit Party spent more than all the other parties combined to win government, with a combined expenditure of $292,802. The Progressive Conservatives spent $83,667; the Liberals, $57,915; and the official opposition New Democratic Party, $49,417.

== Results ==
Elections to the 27th Legislative Assembly of British Columbia (1963)
Political party	Party leader	MLAs				Votes			
Political party	Party leader	Candidates	1960	1963	±	#	±	%	± (pp)
Social Credit	W.A.C. Bennett	52	32	33	1▲	395,079	8,193▲	40.83	2.00▲
New Democratic (Note: successor to the CCF)	Bob Strachan	52	16	14	2▼	269,004	57,090▼	27.80	4.93▼
Liberal	Ray Perrault	51	4	5	1▲	193,363	14,886▼	19.98	0.92▼
Progressive Conservative	Davie Fulton	44	–	–	–	109,090	42,147▲	11.27	4.55▲
Communist		4	–	–	–	849	4,826▼	0.09	0.48▼
Independent (Note: Including one Socialist candidate in Saanich.)		2	–	–	–	290	2,267▼	0.03	0.22▼
Total		205	52	52		967,675		100.00%	
Rejected ballots						6,132	3,730▼		
Actual voters who voted						608,672	23,359▼	69.71%	2.13▼
Registered voters						873,140	1,127▼		

Seats and popular vote by party
Party	Seats	Votes	Change (pp)
█ Social Credit	33 / 52	40.83%	2.00
█ New Democratic	14 / 52	27.80%	-4.93
█ Liberal	5 / 52	19.98%	-0.92
█ Progressive Conservative	0 / 52	11.27%	4.55
█ Other	0 / 52	0.12%	-0.70

== MLAs elected ==
Single-member districts

Alberni: Stanley John Squire
Atlin: Frank Calder
Cariboo: William C. Speare
Chilliwack: William Kenneth Kiernan
Columbia: James Roland Chabot
Comox: Daniel Campbell
Cowichan-Newcastle: Robert Strachan
Cranbrook: Leo Nimsick
Dewdney: Dave Barrett
Esquimalt: Herbert Joseph Bruch
Fernie: Harry McKay
Fort George: Ray Williston
Grand Forks-Greenwood: Lois Haggen
Kamloops: Phil Gaglardi
Kaslo-Slocan: Randolph Harding
Lillooet: Don Robinson
Mackenzie: Anthony Gargrave
Nanaimo and the Islands: David Stupich
Nelson-Creston: Wesley Drewett Black
New Westminster: Rae Eddie
North Okanagan: George McLeod
North Peace River: Jacob Francis Huhn
Oak Bay: Alan MacFarlane
Omineca: Cyril Morley Shelford
Prince Rupert: William Harvey Murray
Revelstoke: Arvid Lundell
Rossland-Trail: Donald Leslie Brothers
Saanich: John Douglas Tisdalle
Salmon Arm: Willis Franklin Jefcoat
Similkameen: Frank Richter, Jr.
Skeena: Dudley George Little
South Okanagan: W. A. C. Bennett
South Peace River: Stanley Carnell
Yale: Bill Hartley

Multi-member districts

Burnaby: Charles MacSorley
Burnaby: Gordon Dowding
Delta: Ernest A. LeCours
Delta: Hunter Vogel
North Vancouver: Gordon Gibson, Sr.
North Vancouver: Ray Perrault
Vancouver-Burrard: Eric Charles Fitzgerald Martin
Vancouver-Burrard: Bert Price
Vancouver Centre: Alexander Small Matthew
Vancouver Centre: Leslie Peterson
Vancouver East: Alexander Macdonald
Vancouver East: Arthur James Turner
Vancouver-Point Grey: Robert Bonner
Vancouver-Point Grey: Ralph Raymond Loffmark
Vancouver-Point Grey: Pat McGeer
Victoria City: William Chant
Victoria City: Waldo McTavish Skillings
Victoria City: John Donald Smith

=== Synopsis of results ===
Results by riding - 1963 British Columbia general election (single-member districts)
Riding	Winning party						Votes						
Name	1960	Party	Votes	Share	Margin #	Margin %	SC	NDP	Lib	PC	Comm	Ind	Total
Alberni	CCF	NDP	4,249	48.14%	743	8.42%	3,506	4,249	–	1,071	–	–	8,826
Atlin	CCF	NDP	549	54.46%	241	23.90%	308	549	151	–	–	–	1,008
Cariboo	SC	SC	3,015	41.98%	1,464	20.38%	3,015	1,482	1,134	1,551	–	–	7,182
Chilliwack	SC	SC	10,031	58.44%	6,906	40.23%	10,031	3,125	2,252	1,757	–	–	17,165
Columbia	SC	SC	1,305	40.08%	213	6.54%	1,305	467	392	1,092	–	–	3,256
Comox	SC	SC	6,598	42.38%	360	2.32%	6,598	6,238	1,259	1,475	–	–	15,570
Cowichan-Newcastle	CCF	NDP	5,422	50.47%	1,846	17.18%	3,576	5,422	904	840	–	–	10,742
Cranbrook	CCF	NDP	2,563	39.09%	930	14.19%	1,633	2,563	835	1,526	–	–	6,557
Dewdney	CCF	NDP	11,625	41.95%	1,119	4.04%	10,506	11,625	4,051	1,532	–	–	27,714
Esquimalt	SC	SC	4,951	48.28%	2,145	20.92%	4,951	2,806	1,398	1,099	–	–	10,254
Fernie	Lib	Lib	1,226	41.67%	189	6.42%	679	1,037	1,226	–	–	–	2,942
Fort George	SC	SC	5,308	60.78%	3,583	41.03%	5,308	1,725	961	739	–	–	8,733
Grand Forks-Greenwood	CCF	NDP	919	38.45%	153	6.40%	705	919	766	–	–	–	2,390
Kamloops	SC	SC	5,669	47.17%	1,196	9.95%	5,669	1,297	580	4,473	–	–	12,019
Kaslo-Slocan	CCF	NDP	1,242	45.07%	149	5.41%	1,093	1,242	301	120	–	–	2,756
Lillooet	SC	SC	1,425	33.77%	309	7.32%	1,425	1,116	977	702	–	–	4,220
Mackenzie	CCF	NDP	4,323	41.61%	403	3.88%	3,920	4,323	2,147	–	–	–	10,390
Nanaimo and the Islands	SC	NDP	4,278	42.44%	19	0.18%	4,259	4,278	960	582	–	–	10,079
Nelson-Creston	SC	SC	4,047	44.65%	2,104	23.21%	4,047	1,943	1,600	1,474	–	–	9,064
New Westminster	CCF	NDP	5,035	37.57%	318	2.38%	4,717	5,035	2,335	1,316	–	–	13,403
North Okanagan	SC	SC	4,157	41.55%	2,081	20.80%	4,157	2,008	2,076	1,765	–	–	10,006
North Peace River	SC	SC	2,310	69.43%	1,707	51.31%	2,310	414	603	–	–	–	3,327
Oak Bay	Lib	Lib	4,457	42.77%	687	6.60%	3,770	469	4,457	1,726	–	–	10,422
Omineca	SC	SC	1,936	55.09%	1,157	32.92%	1,936	779	528	271	–	–	3,514
Prince Rupert	SC	SC	2,357	42.07%	439	7.84%	2,357	1,918	1,328	–	–	–	5,603
Revelstoke	CCF	SC	1,176	41.36%	105	3.69%	1,176	1,071	385	211	–	–	2,843
Rossland-Trail	SC	SC	5,474	51.02%	2,828	26.36%	5,474	2,646	1,139	1,470	–	–	10,729
Saanich	SC	SC	10,657	49.02%	5,879	27.04%	10,657	4,778	3,049	3,180	–	75	21,739
Salmon Arm	SC	SC	2,058	41.55%	413	8.34%	2,058	1,645	245	1,005	–	–	4,953
Similkameen	SC	SC	5,093	48.71%	2,457	23.50%	5,093	2,636	1,423	1,303	–	–	10,455
Skeena	SC	SC	2,963	50.23%	988	16.75%	2,963	1,975	961	–	–	–	5,899
South Okanagan	SC	SC	8,485	63.69%	5,997	45.01%	8,485	1,707	642	2,488	–	–	13,322
South Peace River	SC	SC	3,365	68.81%	2,540	51.94%	3,365	825	700	–	–	–	4,890
Yale	SC	NDP	1,697	37.13%	6	0.14%	1,691	1,697	599	584	–	–	4,571

= open seat
= turnout is above provincial average
= winning candidate was in previous Legislature
= incumbent had switched allegiance
= previously incumbent in another riding
= not incumbent; was previously elected to the Legislature
= incumbency arose from byelection gain
= other incumbents renominated
= previously an MP in the House of Commons of Canada
= multiple candidates

Results by riding - 1963 British Columbia general election (multiple-member districts)
Riding		Winning party		Votes							Voters who voted
Name	MLAs	1960	1963	SC	NDP	Lib	PC	Comm	Ind	Total	Voters who voted
Burnaby	2	2	1 1	14,650	14,750	5,472	2,343	–	–	73,598	41,669
Burnaby	2	2	1 1	14,070	14,409	5,641	2,263	–	–	73,598	41,669
Delta	2	2	2	22,504	18,690	5,553	4,461	–	–	100,327	55,073
Delta	2	2	2	22,067	17,661	5,342	4,049	–	–	100,327	55,073
North Vancouver	2	2	2	13,215	5,764	16,153	3,567	190	–	73,337	37,901
North Vancouver	2	2	2	11,883	5,409	14,068	3,088	–	–	73,337	37,901
Vancouver-Burrard	2	2	2	11,181	10,345	5,798		–	–	58,657	29,534
Vancouver-Burrard	2	2	2	10,612	8,998	5,291		–	–	58,657	29,534
Vancouver Centre	2	2	2	8,060	5,806	3,477	2,741	266	–	39,777	21,312
Vancouver Centre	2	2	2	7,594	5,538	3,467	2,588	240	–	39,777	21,312
Vancouver East	2	2	2	17,031	20,424	3,996	2,308	–	215	87,294	51,781
Vancouver East	2	2	2	16,867	20,292	3,901	2,260	–	–	87,294	51,781
Vancouver-Point Grey	3	3	2 1	23,172	8,663	25,592 (Note: Pat McGeer was elected in a 1962 byelection.)	15,719	–	–	179,472	59,871
Vancouver-Point Grey	3	3	2 1	20,962	8,072	17,641	7,643	–	–	179,472	59,871
Vancouver-Point Grey	3	3	2 1	20,267	8,018	16,510	7,213	–	–	179,472	59,871
Victoria City	3	3	3	9,736	3,557	4,440	2,528	153	–	58,670	22,387
Victoria City	3	3	3	9,347	3,324	4,355	2,282	–	–	58,670	22,387
Victoria City	3	3	3	9,118	3,275	4,302	2,253	–	–	58,670	22,387

= winning candidate

== See also ==
- List of British Columbia political parties
