= Mark Matthew Connelly =

Canadian politician (1879–1955)

MLA for Omineca
- In office 1936–1945

Personal details
- Born: March 21, 1879 Galway, Ireland
- Died: May 5, 1955 (aged 76) Palm Springs, California
- Party: British Columbia Liberal Party
- Spouse: Mabel Ester Gilmour

Mark Matthew Connelly (March 21, 1879 – May 5, 1955) was an Irish-born merchant and politician in British Columbia. He represented Omineca in the Legislative Assembly of British Columbia from 1936 to 1945 as a Liberal.

In 1913, he came to Enderby, British Columbia, where he operated a general store and hotel. In 1918, Connelly, a widower, married Mabel Ester Gilmour. Connelly later moved to Fraser Lake, where he was involved in the lumber business and also owned a hotel. He was first elected to the provincial assembly in a 1936 by-election held after Alexander Malcolm Manson resigned his seat to run unsuccessfully for a seat in the Canadian House of Commons. He was defeated by Edward Fraser Rowland when he ran for reelection in 1945. Connelly served as whip for the Liberal-Conservative coalition in the assembly. He died on May 5, 1955, in Palm Springs, California, after retiring from business.
