= Lyle MacWilliam =

Canadian politician

Lyle Dean MacWilliam
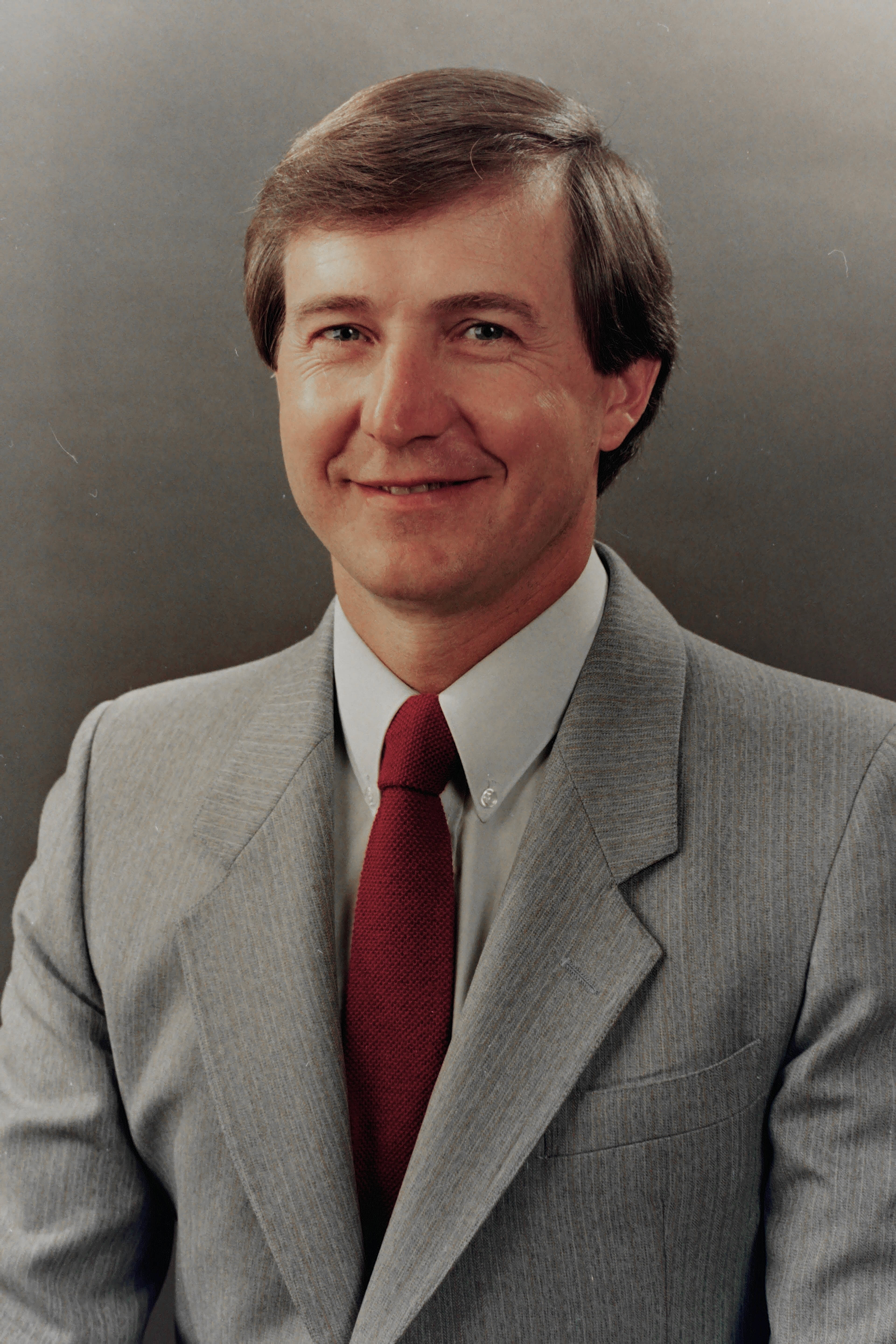

Member of Parliament for Okanagan—Shuswap
- In office 1988–1993
- Preceded by: riding created
- Succeeded by: Darrel Stinson

Member of the British Columbia Legislative Assembly
- In office 1984–1986
- Preceded by: Donald James Campbell
- Succeeded by: Lyall Franklin Hanson

Personal details
- Born: 31 July 1949 (age 76) Vancouver, British Columbia, Canada
- Party: Liberal
- Other political affiliations: New Democratic Party (1988–1997); British Columbia New Democratic Party (1983–1997)
- Spouse: Arlene L. (m. 21 August 1971)

Lyle Dean MacWilliam (born 31 July 1949) was a New Democratic member of the House of Commons of Canada from 1988 to 1993, representing the constituency of Okanagan-Shuswap.

Born in Vancouver, British Columbia, the son of John Michael MacWilliam and Doris Louise Coghill, MacWilliam studied at Simon Fraser University. In 1971, he married Arlene Leslie Sundvick.

MacWilliam ran unsuccessfully for a seat in the Legislative Assembly of British Columbia in 1983. He was elected to represent Okanagan North in the assembly as a New Democratic Party member in a 1984 by-election held following the death of Donald James Campbell. At the time, MacWilliam's victory was considered a major upset as he was a 35-year old high school teacher facing off against Harold Thorlakson, a popular area rancher representing the governing Social Credit Party in a seat the party had held consistently since 1952.

In the lead-up to the 1986 provincial election, MacWilliam became embroiled in an internal party debate over whether to force the resignation of then-leader Bob Skelly, with some in the party concerned about Skelly's popularity compared to that of the new Premier Bill Vander Zalm. MacWilliam spoke candidly about the party's internal discussions to the Canadian Press, commenting "This is a very sensitive topic and I think I might be overstepping my limits on this." MacWilliam was defeated in his bid for reelection in the province's 1986 election.

MacWilliam entered federal politics after winning the 1988 federal election at the Okanagan—Shuswap electoral district for the New Democratic Party. During his tenure in parliament, MacWilliam earned a reputation as a rebellious partisan, often breaking with his caucus on votes. Notably, in 1992, MacWilliam was one of five NDP MPs who publicly broke with party leader Audrey McLaughlin over Bill C-81, which updated legislation surrounding referendums. The party's official position was that the bill needed firm spending caps for referendum sides, which MacWilliam disregarded in his vote. By the end of 1992, Vancouver Sun columnist Peter O'Neil gave MacWilliam a grade of "C−" on his performance, writing that the MP's "judgment [was] in question." In his 1993 bid for re-election, MacWilliam lost to Darrel Stinson of the Reform Party.

In 1997, MacWilliam announced he would be joining the Liberal Party and contest his former seat in the 1997 federal election. In an interview given to the Okanagan Saturday, MacWilliam indicated that he had grown disillusioned with the NDP not long after being elected to parliament, claiming he "came very close to sitting as an independent." This was despite his position as the party's communications critic and decision to run again under the party's banner. MacWilliams also stated the Liberals were courting him during the 1993 election and critiqued the party's ideology and ties to organized labour. In the general election, he was again defeated by Stinson, placing second with only 175 fewer votes than he had received running as a New Democrat in 1993.

== Electoral results ==
1997 Canadian federal election
Party	Candidate	Votes	%	±%	Expenditures
Reform	Darrel Stinson	24,952	53.12	+10.67	$63,898
Liberal	Lyle MacWilliam	11,585	24.66	+6.24	$60,414
New Democratic	Calvin White	5,839	12.43	-11.31	$17,699
Progressive Conservative	Norm Crerar	3,160	6.72	-3.12	$18,143
Canadian Action	Claire Foss	802	1.70	+1.54	$5,555
Independent	David Lethbridge	370	0.78	–	$1,657
Independent	Gordon Campbell	257	0.54	+0.11	
Total valid votes		46,965	100.0		
Total rejected ballots		147	0.31		
Turnout		47,112	67.06		
Reform hold		Swing		+2.22	
Liberal candidate Lyle MacWilliam gained 0.92 percentage points from the last election, when he ran as a New Democrat.

1993 Canadian federal election
Party	Candidate	Votes	%	±%
Reform	Darrel Stinson	21,023	42.45	+39.38
New Democratic	Lyle MacWilliam	11,760	23.74	-19.73
Liberal	Brooke Jeffrey	9,124	18.42	+2.50
Progressive Conservative	Alice Klim	4,871	9.84	-26.35
National	Don MacLennan	2,018	4.07	–
Green	Hermann Bruns	312	0.63	-0.52
Independent	Gordon Campbell	211	0.43	–
Natural Law	Rig Gelfand	130	0.26	–
Canada Party	Claire Foss	78	0.16	–
Total valid votes		49,527	100.0	
Reform gain from New Democratic		Swing		+29.56

1988 Canadian federal election
Party	Candidate	Votes	%
New Democratic	Lyle Dean MacWilliam	18,749	43.47
Progressive Conservative	Jake Spoor	15,606	36.19
Liberal	David L. Simpson	6,868	15.92
Reform	Donald McDonell	1,321	3.06
Green	Connie K. Harris	495	1.15
Independent	Kathleen Daniels	89	0.21
Total valid votes		43,128	100.0
This riding was created from parts of Kamloops—Shuswap and Okanagan North, which elected a New Democrat and a Progressive Conservative, respectively, in the previous election.

1986 British Columbia general election: Okanagan North
Party	Candidate	Votes	%	±%
Social Credit	Lyall Franklin Hansen	11,936	48.13	+6.16
New Democratic	Lyle Dean MacWilliam	11,540	46.54	-2.52
Progressive Conservative	E. Shirley H. Spiller	800	3.23	–
Liberal	Dieter W.A. Bauer	522	2.10	-5.42
Total valid votes		24,798	100.00	
Total rejected ballots		290		
Turnout				
Registered voters				
Source: Elections BC

British Columbia provincial by-election, 11 October 1984 On the death of Donald James Campbell, 10 June 1984
Party	Candidate	Votes	%	±%
New Democratic	Lyle Dean MacWilliam	9,707	49.06	+7.83
Social Credit	Harold Thorlakson	8,303	41.97	-12.25
Liberal	Frank Cole	1,487	7.52	+4.72
Western Canada Concept	Clyde Nunn	288	1.45	-0.30
Total valid votes		19,785	100.00	
Total rejected ballots		147		
Turnout				
Registered voters				
Source: Elections BC

1983 British Columbia general election: Okanagan North
Party	Candidate	Votes	%	±%
Social Credit	Donald James Campbell	13,647	54.22	
New Democratic	Lyle Dean MacWilliam	10,380	41.23	
Liberal	Maury Banks	706	2.80	
Western Canada Concept	Art Robatzek	441	1.75	
Total valid votes		25,174	100.00	
Total rejected ballots		237		
Turnout				
Registered voters				
Source: Elections BC
