= William Henry Brett (British Columbia politician) =

Canadian politician and fisherman

Member of the Legislative Assembly of British Columbia

Member of the British Columbia Legislative Assembly for Prince Rupert
- In office 1945–1949
- Preceded by: Thomas Dufferin Pattullo
- Succeeded by: John Duncan McRae

Personal details
- Born: William Henry Brett; August 25, 1895 Fogo, Newfoundland
- Died: April 30, 1972 (aged 76) Prince Rupert, British Columbia
- Party: Co-operative Commonwealth Federation
- Occupation: Politician; fisherman

William Henry Brett (August 25, 1895 – April 30, 1972) was a Canadian politician and fisherman who served as a member of the Legislative Assembly of British Columbia representing the riding of Prince Rupert from 1945 to 1949 as a member of the Co-operative Commonwealth Federation.

Brett was born in Fogo, Newfoundland and Labrador, in 1895 and joined the Royal Navy Reserve at the start of World War I and served overseas. After the war, he settled in Prince Rupert, British Columbia, where he was involved in deep sea fishing. Brett was president of the Deep Sea Fisherman's Union local and of the Prince Rupert Fisherman's Credit Union. He later served as general manager of the Fisherman's Co-operative. Brett served three years on Prince Rupert city council. He defeated former premier Thomas Dufferin Pattullo to win his seat in the assembly in 1945. Brett was defeated by John Duncan McRae when he ran for reelection in 1949. He died in Prince Rupert at the age of 76.
