= Arthur Bruce Brown =

Canadian politician (1911–1975)

Member of the British Columbia Legislative Assembly for Prince Rupert
- In office June 9, 1953 – August 13, 1956
- Preceded by: George Edwin Hills
- Succeeded by: William Harvey Murray

Personal details
- Born: Arthur Bruce Brown; March 17, 1911 Grand Forks, British Columbia
- Died: December 20, 1975 (aged 64) Qualicum Beach, British Columbia
- Party: BC Liberal
- Spouse: Shirley Seldon
- Children: 3
- Occupation: Barrister; solicitor

Arthur Bruce Brown (March 17, 1911 – December 20, 1975) was a Canadian politician who served a member of the Legislative Assembly of British Columbia (MLA) representing the riding of Prince Rupert from 1953 to 1956 as a member of the Liberal Party. He stood for re-election in 1956 but was defeated by a candidate of the Social Credit party.
