= Isabel Dawson =

Canadian politician

Member of the British Columbia Legislative Assembly for Mackenzie
- In office September 12, 1966 – August 30, 1972
- Preceded by: Anthony Gargrave
- Succeeded by: Don Lockstead

Personal details
- Born: Isabel Pearl Saunders; October 13, 1917 Camrose, Alberta
- Died: March 9, 1982 (aged 64) Victoria, British Columbia
- Cause of death: Cancer
- Party: Social Credit

Isabel Pearl Dawson (October 13, 1917 – April 9, 1982) was a political figure in British Columbia, Canada. After being defeated in the 1963 provincial election, she represented Mackenzie in the Legislative Assembly of British Columbia from 1966 to 1972 as a Social Credit member.

She was born Isabel Pearl Saunders in Camrose, Alberta, the daughter of John David Saunders, and was educated there and in Princeton, British Columbia and Vancouver. She served in the Canadian Women's Army Corps during World War II. She married Charles John Dawson. Isabel Dawson served in the provincial cabinet as a minister without portfolio. She was defeated by Don Lockstead when she ran for reelection to the provincial assembly in 1972. After leaving politics, Dawson earned a degree in psychology from the University of Victoria and an MSc in gerontology from the University of Oregon. In 1974, she moved to Victoria from Powell River. Dawson died of cancer at the age of 64.

The Isabel Dawson building at Camosun College is named in her honour.
