= Don Phillips (Canadian politician) =

Canadian politician (1929-2016)

Member of the British Columbia Legislative Assembly for South Peace River
- In office August 30, 1972 – April 28, 1986
- Preceded by: Donald Albert Marshall
- Succeeded by: Jack Weisgerber
- In office September 12, 1966 – July 21, 1969
- Preceded by: Stanley Carnell
- Succeeded by: Donald Albert Marshall

Personal details
- Born: August 24, 1929 Woodstock, New Brunswick
- Died: October 5, 2016 (aged 87) Benowa, Queensland, Australia
- Party: Social Credit
- Spouse: Joan Robertson (m. 1981)
- Children: Dale Phillips, John Phillips, Mark Phillips, Neal Phillips, Melanie Robertson-Ober
- Occupation: car dealer

Donald McGray Phillips (August 24, 1929 – October 5, 2016) was a Canadian politician who represented the constituency of South Peace River in the Legislative Assembly of British Columbia from 1966 to 1969 and from 1972 to 1986. Part of the Social Credit Party caucus, he held various cabinet posts under Premier Bill Bennett.

== Biography ==
Originally a car dealer in Dawson Creek, Phillips ran as a Social Credit (Socred) candidate in the 1966 provincial election, and was elected member of the Legislative Assembly (MLA) for South Peace River. He did not contest the 1969 election, and Donald Albert Marshall won the riding as a Socred. With Marshall switching to the Progressive Conservatives in 1972, Phillips returned as the riding's Socred candidate for that August's election, and defeated Marshall by 21 votes to re-enter the legislature.

After W. A. C. Bennett resigned as Socred leader in 1973, Phillips nominated Bennett's son Bill for the leadership election; the younger Bennett won the race that November. The Socreds returned to power in the 1975 election, and the re-elected Phillips was named to Bill Bennett's cabinet that December as Minister of Agriculture and Minister of Economic Development, before dropping the agriculture portfolio in October 1976.

He kept his cabinet role following his re-election in 1979, and additionally became Minister of Tourism and Small Business Development, replacing the defeated Elwood Veitch. Both roles were consolidated to Minister of Industry, Tourism and Small Business Development in November 1979; the position was further amended to Minister of Industry and Small Business Development in January 1980, with tourism split off to a separate post. During this time he was responsible for expanding trade with Pacific rim countries and establishing the Northeast Coal Development project, which saw the creation of the community of Tumbler Ridge.

Phillips was re-elected in 1983, and in February 1985 became Minister of International Trade and Investment; he was additionally given the duties but not the title of Minister of Forests in January 1986 after Thomas Waterland's resignation. He was dropped from the cabinet in February 1986, and resigned as MLA that April. He then worked for a while as a lobbyist before retiring to Australia, the home country of his wife Joan. He lived on the Gold Coast in his later years, and died on October 5, 2016, at the age of 87.

British Columbia provincial government of Bill Bennett
Cabinet posts (6)
Predecessor	Office	Successor
Position established	Minister of International Trade and Investment; February 27, 1985 – February 11, 1986	Pat McGeer
himself (Industry, Tourism and Small Business Development)	Minister of Industry and Small Business Development; January 11, 1980 – February 27, 1985	Bob McClelland
himself (Economic Development; Tourism and Small Business Development)	Minister of Industry, Tourism and Small Business Development; November 24, 1979 – January 11, 1980	himself (Industry and Small Business Development); Patricia Jordan (Tourism)
Elwood Veitch	Minister of Tourism and Small Business Development; June 5, 1979 – November 24, 1979	himself (Industry, Tourism and Small Business Development)
Gary Lauk	Minister of Economic Development; December 22, 1975 – November 24, 1979	himself (Industry, Tourism and Small Business Development)
David Stupich	Minister of Agriculture; December 22, 1975 – October 29, 1976	Jim Hewitt
