= John Duncan McRae =

Canadian politician (1915–1999)

Member of the British Columbia Legislative Assembly for Prince Rupert
- In office June 15, 1949 – May 10, 1952
- Preceded by: William Henry Brett
- Succeeded by: George Edwin Hills

Personal details
- Born: John Duncan McRae; May 28, 1915 San Diego, California
- Died: June 25, 1999 (aged 84) Victoria, British Columbia
- Party: Liberal (before 1949; 1952–death)
- Other political affiliations: Liberal-Conservative Coalition (1949–1952)
- Spouse: Grayce Leah Morton Oxner
- Occupation: Politician; businessman; merchant

John Duncan McRae (May 28, 1915 – June 25, 1999) was an American-Canadian politician, businessman and merchant who served as a member of the Legislative Assembly of British Columbia (MLA) representing the riding of Prince Rupert from 1949 to 1952 as a member of the Liberal-Conservative Coalition. In the 1952 general election, McRae ran for reelection as a member of the Liberal Party, but lost to George Edwin Hills.
