= George Edwin Hills =

Canadian politician

Member of the British Columbia Legislative Assembly for Prince Rupert
- In office June 12, 1952 – May 19, 1953
- Preceded by: John Duncan McRae
- Succeeded by: Arthur Bruce Brown

Mayor of Prince Rupert
- In office 1954–1957

Personal details
- Born: George Edwin Hills; June 30, 1905 Grimsby, England
- Died: April 3, 1978 (aged 72) Nanaimo, British Columbia
- Party: Co-operative Commonwealth Federation
- Spouse: Elizabeth Casey

George Edwin Hills (June 30, 1905 – April 3, 1978) was an English-Canadian politician and contractor who served as a member of the Legislative Assembly of British Columbia (MLA) representing the riding of Prince Rupert from 1952 to 1953 as a member of the Co-operative Commonwealth Federation (CCF) and mayor of Prince Rupert from 1954 to 1957.

== Life and career ==
Hills was born in Grimsby, England. He immigrated to Canada and settled in Prince Rupert, British Columbia, where he became involved in local politics. He married Elizabeth Casey and began his political career as an alderman for Prince Rupert.

Hills was elected to the Legislative Assembly of British Columbia in the 1952 general election as a member of the CCF, which was a socialist political party at the time. However, his term in the assembly was short-lived being defeated in the 1953 general election. He later ran unsuccessful in his bid for re-election in the 1956 general election. In addition to his provincial political involvement, Hills served as mayor of Prince Rupert from 1954 to 1957.

Hills moved to Nanaimo, British Columbia around 1968 and lived there until his death on April 3, 1978.
