= North Peace River =

Defunct provincial electoral district in British Columbia, Canada

North Peace River was a provincial electoral district in the Canadian province of British Columbia. It was first contested in the general election of 1956 and last contested in the general election of 1986. It and neighbouring South Peace River were formed by the partition of the old Peace River riding. Redistribution in advance of the 1991 election saw North Peace River adjusted and renamed Peace River North.

== Members of the Legislative Assembly ==
Assembly	Years	Member	Party
Peace River prior to 1956
25th	1956–1960	Harold Earl Roche	Social Credit
26th	1960–1963	Jacob Francis Huhn	Social Credit
28th	1963–1966	Jacob Francis Huhn	Social Credit
28th	1966–1969	Ed Smith	Social Credit
29th	1969–1972	Ed Smith	Social Credit
30th	1972–1975	Ed Smith	Social Credit
31st	1975–1979	Ed Smith	Social Credit
32nd	1979–1983	Tony Brummet	Social Credit
33rd	1983–1986	Tony Brummet	Social Credit

== Election results ==
25th British Columbia election, 1956
Party	Candidate	Votes	%	±	Expenditures
Social Credit	Harold Earl Roche	1,087	53.23%	–	unknown
Liberal	John William Belesaigne Baker	423	20.71%		unknown
Co-operative Commonwealth Fed.	Vera Agnes Loucks	359	17.58%		unknown
Common Herd	Margaret Teresa Lally Murray	173	8.47%	–	unknown
Total valid votes		2,042	100.00%		
Total rejected ballots		80			
Turnout		%			

26th British Columbia election, 1960
Party	Candidate	Votes	%	±	Expenditures
Social Credit	Jacob Francis Huhn	1,651	46.21%	–	unknown
Liberal	John William Belesaigne Baker	958	26.81%		unknown
Co-operative Commonwealth Fed.	John Gordon Curtis	769	21.52%		unknown
Progressive Conservative	Wilbert Daniel Bowes	114	3.19%		unknown
Independent	Robert Lyle Angus	81	2.27%		unknown
Total valid votes		3,573	100.00%		
Total rejected ballots		57			
Turnout		%			

27th British Columbia election, 1963
Party	Candidate	Votes	%	±	Expenditures
Social Credit	Jacob Francis Huhn	2,310	69.43%	–	unknown
Liberal	Daniel Gilchrist Murray	603	18.12%		unknown
New Democratic	Douglas George Pomeroy (Note: Listed as Dan George in statement of votes)	414	12.44%		unknown
Total valid votes		3,327	100.00%		
Total rejected ballots		34			
Turnout		%			

28th British Columbia election, 1966
Party	Candidate	Votes	%	±	Expenditures
Social Credit	Dean Edward Smith	1,799	48.44%	–	unknown
Independent	Jacob Francis Huhn	583	15.70%		unknown
Liberal	Leith Douglas Boulter	565	15.21%		unknown
New Democratic	Douglas George Pomeroy	511	13.76%		unknown
Independent	Robert Lyle Angus	256	6.89%		unknown
Total valid votes		3,714	100.00%		
Total rejected ballots		35			
Turnout		%			

29th British Columbia election, 1969
Party	Candidate	Votes	%	±	Expenditures
Social Credit	Dean Edward Smith	3,877	73.23%	–	unknown
New Democratic	Douglas George Pomeroy	933	17.62%		unknown
Liberal	Leith Douglas Boulter	484	9.14%		unknown
Total valid votes		5,294	100.00%		
Total rejected ballots		49			
Turnout		%			

30th British Columbia election, 1972
Party	Candidate	Votes	%	±	Expenditures
Social Credit	Dean Edward Smith	3,004	46.02%	–	unknown
New Democratic	Dennis Warren Nelson	1,699	26.03%		unknown
Progressive Conservative	Derril Laverne Leahy	1,560	23.90%		unknown
Liberal	William John Herdy	265	4.06%		unknown
Total valid votes		6,528	100.00%		
Total rejected ballots		87			
Turnout		%			

31st British Columbia election, 1975
Party	Candidate	Votes	%	±	Expenditures
Social Credit	Dean Edward Smith	5,048	67.87%	–	unknown
New Democratic	Andrew Philip Schuck	2,139	28.76%		unknown
Liberal	Desmond Martin	251	3.37%		unknown
Total valid votes		7,438	100.00%		
Total rejected ballots		96			
Turnout		%			

32nd British Columbia election, 1979
Party	Candidate	Votes	%	±	Expenditures
Social Credit	Anthony Julius (Tony) Brummet	6,598	76.02%	–	unknown
New Democratic	Joseph Mark Breti	2,081	23.98%		unknown
Total valid votes		8,679	100.00%		
Total rejected ballots		147			
Turnout		%			

33rd British Columbia election, 1983
Party	Candidate	Votes	%	±	Expenditures
Social Credit	Anthony Julius (Tony) Brummet	8,528	76.71%	–	unknown
New Democratic	Elmer George Kabush	2,349	21.13%		unknown
Liberal	David Charles Parkinson	240	2.16%		unknown
Total valid votes		11,117	100.00%		
Total rejected ballots		108			
Turnout		%			

34th British Columbia election, 1986
Party	Candidate	Votes	%	±	Expenditures
Social Credit	Anthony Julius (Tony) Brummet	6,359	67.21%	–	unknown
New Democratic	Ken Platz	2,314	24.46%		unknown
Progressive Conservative	Ian Bernard MacKenzie	511	5.40%		unknown
Liberal	Jill C. Moore	277	2.93%		unknown
Total valid votes		9,461	100.00%		
Total rejected ballots		139			
Turnout		%			

== See also ==
- List of British Columbia provincial electoral districts
- Canadian provincial electoral districts
