= Robert Cecil Steele =

Canadian politician (1903–1976)

Member of the Legislative Assembly of British Columbia
- In office 1949–1952
- Preceded by: Edward Fraser Rowland
- Succeeded by: Cyril Morley Shelford
- Constituency: Omineca

Personal details
- Born: August 5, 1903 Fairmeade, Saskatchewan
- Died: May 19, 1976 (aged 72) White Rock, British Columbia
- Party: Coalition
- Spouse: Ellen Calder Finnis
- Children: 3
- Occupation: businessman

Robert Cecil Steele (August 5, 1903 – May 19, 1976) was a Canadian politician. He served in the Legislative Assembly of British Columbia from 1949 to 1952 from the electoral district of Omineca, a member of the Coalition government.
