= Donald Albert Marshall =

Canadian politician

MLA for South Peace River
- In office 1969–1972
- Preceded by: Donald McGray Phillips
- Succeeded by: Donald McGray Phillips

Personal details
- Born: August 2, 1932 (age 93) Calgary, Alberta
- Party: Social Credit (?–1972); Progressive Conservative (1972)
- Spouse: Shirley Arlene Johnson (m.1956)
- Children: 3
- Occupation: businessman

Donald Albert Marshall (born August 2, 1932) is a former Canadian politician who served in the Legislative Assembly of British Columbia from 1969 to 1972 from the electoral district of South Peace River, a member of the Social Credit Party. He switched his affiliation to Progressive Conservative on March 22, 1972.
