= Graham Lea =

Canadian politician (1934–2013)

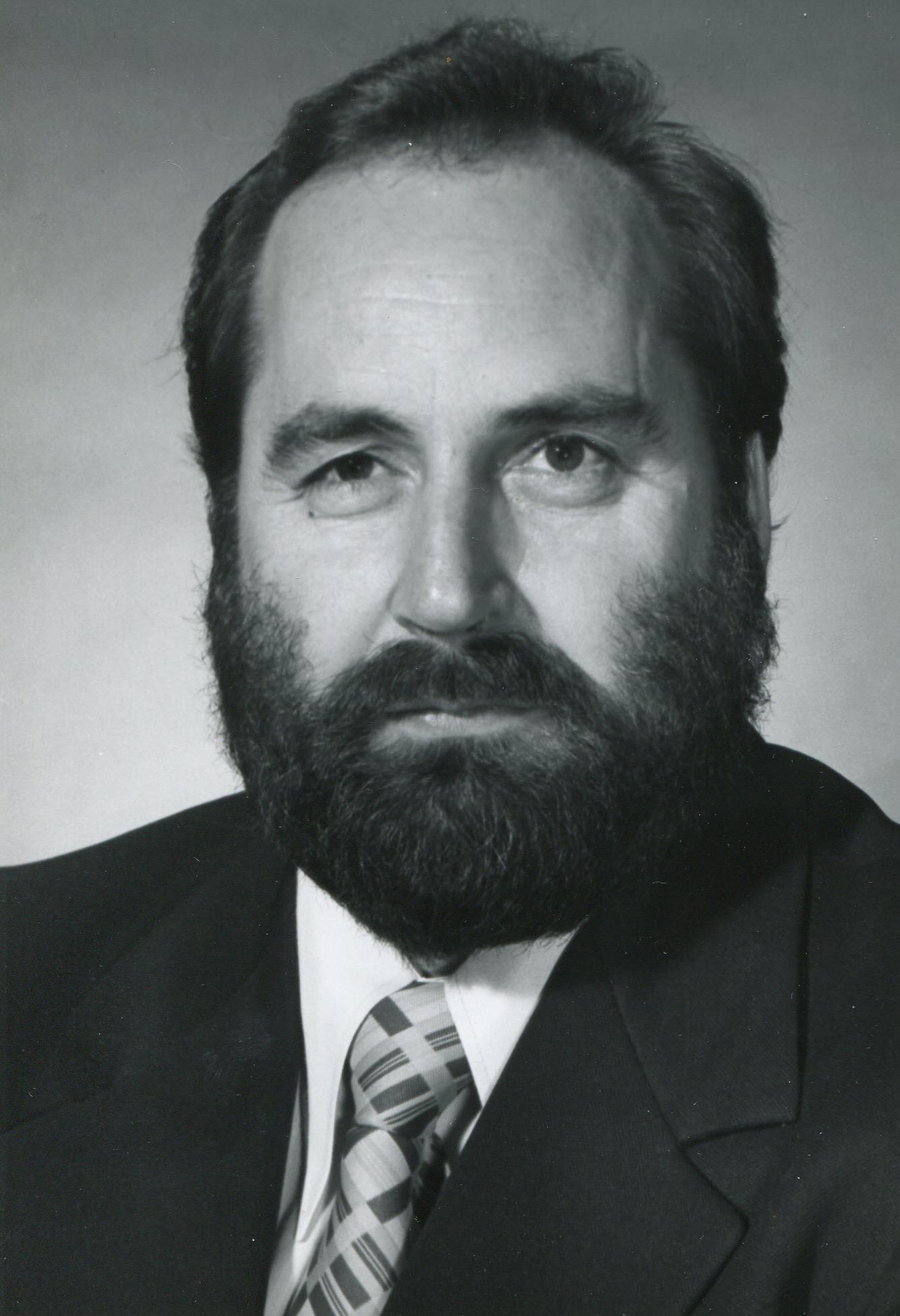

Member of the British Columbia Legislative Assembly for Prince Rupert
- In office August 30, 1972 – October 22, 1986
- Preceded by: William Harvey Murray
- Succeeded by: Dan Miller

Personal details
- Born: March 6, 1934 Nakusp, British Columbia
- Died: April 3, 2013 (aged 79) Victoria, British Columbia
- Party: Progressive Conservative (1986-death)
- Other political affiliations: United Party (1984-1986); New Democratic (1972-1984)

Graham Richard Lea (March 6, 1934 – April 3, 2013) was a Canadian politician, broadcaster, and corporate leader who served a member of the Legislative Assembly of British Columbia from 1972 to 1986. He represented the riding of Prince Rupert as a member of the New Democratic Party (until 1984), then United Party (until 1986), and finally Progressive Conservative Party.

== Life and career ==
He was born in Nakusp, British Columbia, the son of George Lea and Beatrice Ellen Graham. Lea served in the Royal Canadian Air Force from 1951 to 1954 and as a CBC broadcaster in Whitehorse, Vancouver and Prince Rupert. First married to Elaine, who he had three children with, then another son with Sharon Clifford, following he was married to Rozlynne Mitchell for many years until his death on April 3, 2013. Lea had four children - Melanie, Marni, Alex, David and nine grandchildren. Lea served in the provincial cabinet as Minister of Highways in the Barrett government and as opposition critic for a number of economic portfolios . After an unsuccessful bid for the leadership of the NDP in 1984, he sat as an independent. Lea then sat as a member of the short-lived United Party of British Columbia. In 1986, he became a Progressive Conservative party member. Lea did not run for reelection in 1986. Following his political career Lea served as executive director of the Truck Loggers Association for 11 years. During his political and corporate tenure Lea was a strong voice in provincial economic and resource related policies.

Lea died on April 3, 2013, at Victoria.
