= South Peace River =

Defunct provincial electoral district in British Columbia, Canada

South Peace River was a provincial electoral district of British Columbia, Canada. It was first contested in the general election of 1956 and last contested in the general election of 1986. It and neighbouring North Peace River were formed by the partition of the old Peace River riding. Redistribution in advance of the 1991 election saw South Peace River adjusted and renamed Peace River South.

== Members of the Legislative Assembly ==
Assembly	Years	Member	Party
Peace River prior to 1956
25th	1956–1960	Stanley Carnell	Social Credit
26th	1960–1963	Stanley Carnell	Social Credit
28th	1963–1966	Stanley Carnell	Social Credit
28th	1966–1969	Donald M. Phillips	Social Credit
29th	1969–1972	Donald Albert Marshall	Social Credit
29th	1972	Donald Albert Marshall	Progressive Conservative
30th	1972–1975	Donald M. Phillips	Social Credit
31st	1975–1979	Donald M. Phillips	Social Credit
32nd	1979–1983	Donald M. Phillips	Social Credit
33rd	1983–1986	Donald M. Phillips	Social Credit
34th	1986–1991	Jack Weisgerber	Social Credit

== Election results ==
25th British Columbia election, 1956
Party	Candidate	Votes	%	±	Expenditures
Social Credit	Stanley Carnell	1,787	50.80%	–	unknown
Co-operative Commonwealth Fed.	Arthur Roald Dahlen	1,275	36.24%		unknown
Liberal	Harold John Burton	456	12.96%		unknown
Total valid votes		3,518	100.00%		
Total rejected ballots		49			
Turnout		%			

26th British Columbia election, 1960
Party	Candidate	Votes	%	±	Expenditures
Social Credit	Stanley Carnell	3,133	59.39%	–	unknown
Co-operative Commonwealth Fed.	John Close	1,339	25.38%		unknown
Progressive Conservative	Peter Runkle	500	9.48%		unknown
Liberal	Joseph H. Lowes	303	5.74%		unknown
Total valid votes		5,275	100.00%		
Total rejected ballots		64			
Turnout		%			

27th British Columbia election, 1963
Party	Candidate	Votes	%	±	Expenditures
Social Credit	Stanley Carnell	3,365	68.81%	–	unknown
New Democratic	John Close	825	16.87%		unknown
Liberal	William Arthur McClellan	700	14.31%		unknown
Total valid votes		4,890	100.00%		
Total rejected ballots		54			
Turnout		%			

28th British Columbia election, 1966
Party	Candidate	Votes	%	±	Expenditures
Social Credit	Donald McGray Phillips	2,585	59.78%	–	unknown
Liberal	Vera Daphne Peel Phillips	888	20.54%		unknown
New Democratic	Raymond Clarence Cowan	851	19.68%		unknown
Total valid votes		4,324	100.00%		
Total rejected ballots		77			
Turnout		%			

29th British Columbia election, 1969
Party	Candidate	Votes	%	±	Expenditures
Social Credit	Donald Albert Marshall	4,267	70.33%	–	unknown
New Democratic	Raymond Elden Adams	1,210	19.94%		unknown
Liberal	Phillip Sydney Sykes	590	9.72%		unknown
Total valid votes		6,067	100.00%		
Total rejected ballots		50			
Turnout		%			

30th British Columbia election, 1972
Party	Candidate	Votes	%	±	Expenditures
Social Credit	Donald McGray Phillips	2,972	42.26%	–	unknown
Progressive Conservative	Donald Albert Marshall	2,951	41.97%		unknown
New Democratic	John R. Watkins	953	13.55%		unknown
Liberal	Francis James McIntyre	156	2.22%		unknown
Total valid votes		7,032	100.00%		
Total rejected ballots		107			
Turnout		%			

31st British Columbia election, 1975
Party	Candidate	Votes	%	±	Expenditures
Social Credit	Donald McGray Phillips	4,540	62.84%	–	unknown
New Democratic	Corliss Patricia Miller	2,233	30.91%		unknown
Liberal	James Bailey Henderson	452	6.25%		unknown
Total valid votes		7,225	100.00%		
Total rejected ballots		58			
Turnout		%			

32nd British Columbia election, 1979
Party	Candidate	Votes	%	±	Expenditures
Social Credit	Donald McGray Phillips	5,269	65.42%	–	unknown
New Democratic	Corliss Patricia Miller	2,785	34.58%		unknown
Total valid votes		8,054	100.00%		
Total rejected ballots		123			
Turnout		%			

33rd British Columbia election, 1983
Party	Candidate	Votes	%	±	Expenditures
Social Credit	Donald McGray Phillips	6,540	64.34%	–	unknown
New Democratic	Glen Patrick Michiel	3,368	33.13%		unknown
Liberal	William George Litwin	257	2.53%		unknown
Total valid votes		10,165	100.00%		
Total rejected ballots		156			
Turnout		%			

34th British Columbia election, 1986
Party	Candidate	Votes	%	±	Expenditures
Social Credit	John Sylverster (Jack) Weisgerber	5,408	51.67%	–	unknown
New Democratic	Hugh Cooper	3,382	32.31%		unknown
Progressive Conservative	John Peter Diemert	1,676	16.02%		unknown
Total valid votes		10,466	100.00%		
Total rejected ballots		163			
Turnout		%			

== See also ==
- List of British Columbia provincial electoral districts
- Canadian provincial electoral districts
