= Patricia Jordan =

Canadian politician and registered nurse (1930–1997)

Member of the British Columbia Legislative Assembly for Okanagan North North Okanagan (1966–1979)
- In office September 12, 1966 – May 5, 1983
- Preceded by: George William McLeod
- Succeeded by: Donald James Campbell

Personal details
- Born: Patricia Jane Laidman; December 7, 1930 Vernon, British Columbia, Canada
- Died: February 24, 1997 (aged 66) Kelowna, British Columbia, Canada
- Party: Social Credit
- Spouse: Laurance T. Jordan
- Occupation: Nurse

Patricia Jane Jordan (née Laidman, December 7, 1930 – February 24, 1997) was a Canadian registered nurse and politician in British Columbia. She represented North Okanagan in the Legislative Assembly of British Columbia from 1966 to 1983 as a Social Credit member.

== Biography ==
Patricia Jane Laidman was born in Vernon, British Columbia on December 7, 1930, the daughter of John William Laidman and Eva Maud Wiseman. She was educated in Vernon, at the University of British Columbia and at the Vancouver General Hospital School of Nursing. In 1954, she married Dr. Laurance T. Jordan. She served in the provincial cabinet as a minister without portfolio and as Minister of Tourism. Jordan retired from politics in 1983. Jordan died in Kelowna, British Columbia on February 24, 1997, at the age of 66.
