= Herbert Gargrave =

Canadian politician (1905-1973)

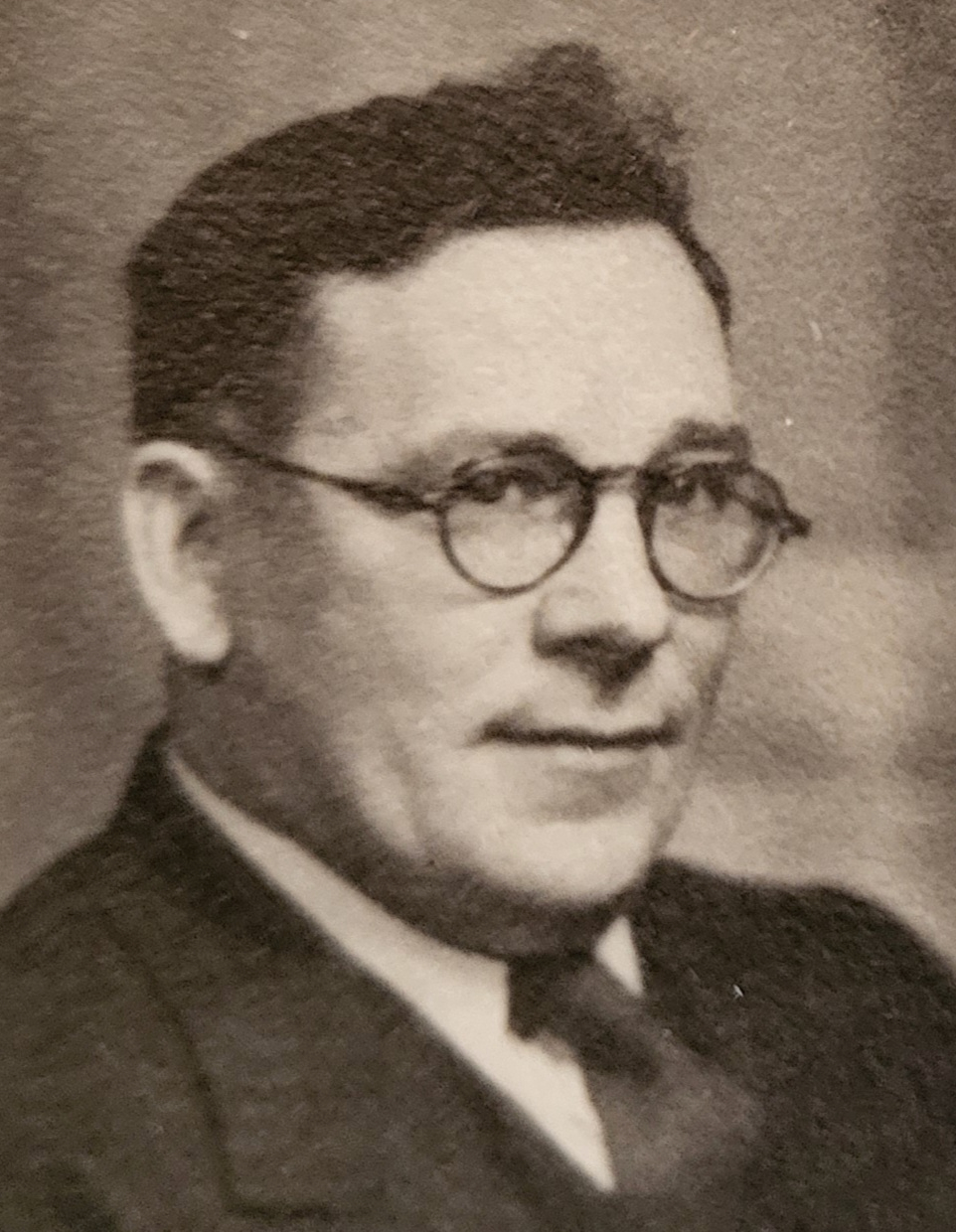

Herbert Gargrave (1905 – 20 November 1973) was an English-born painter and decorator and political figure in British Columbia. He represented Mackenzie in the Legislative Assembly of British Columbia from 1941 to 1949 as a Co-operative Commonwealth Federation (CCF) member.

He was born in London and came to Canada in 1928, living in Regina, Saskatchewan for a year before moving to Vancouver. Gargrave served as secretary of the National Painters' Union. He joined the Socialist Party of Canada and helped form the Young Socialists' League. Gargrave served as provincial secretary for the CCF and was a member of the CCF National Council from 1938 to 1944. He ran unsuccessfully for a seat in the provincial assembly in 1937. Gargrave was defeated when he ran for reelection in 1949. He later moved to Toronto where he worked with the Canadian Labour Congress and then with the Canadian executive of the United Steelworkers of America. In May 1972, Gargrave was named to the federal public service arbitration tribunal. He died the following year in Toronto at the age of 67.

His brother Anthony also served in the provincial assembly for Mackenzie between 1952 and 1966.
