= Harold Earl Roche =

Canadian politician

MLA for North Peace River
- In office 1956–1960

Personal details
- Born: September 8, 1893 Minnedosa, Manitoba
- Died: August 22, 1961 (aged 67) Vancouver, British Columbia
- Party: Social Credit Party of British Columbia

Harold Earl Roche (September 8, 1893 – August 22, 1961) was a Canadian politician. He served in the Legislative Assembly of British Columbia from 1956 to 1960, as a Social Credit member for the constituency of North Peace River.
