= Ray Perrault =

Canadian politician (1926–2008)

Raymond Joseph Perrault, PC (February 6, 1926 – November 24, 2008) was a Canadian politician. He was a member of the Legislative Assembly of British Columbia and of the Senate of Canada.

Perrault was born in Vancouver, British Columbia, a family with strong Liberal roots. His maternal grandfather came from Ontario and enlisted to quell the Metis rebellion led by Louis Riel. His paternal grandfather came from Quebec, where Riel had been a hero. Perrault was educated at Sir Guy Carleton school and John Oliver high school in Vancouver.

After graduating from the University of British Columbia with degrees in economics and political science, he became a communications consultant, working in radio, public relations and advertising. He entered politics in his thirties, becoming leader of the British Columbia Liberal Party in 1959. He was first elected to the Legislative Assembly of British Columbia in the 1960 provincial election in which the Liberals won fours seats in the legislature (an increase from two in the previous election), and won 20.9% of the popular vote.

In the 1963 election, the Liberals gained one more Member of the Legislative Assembly (MLA), for a total of five, while their share of the popular vote fell to 19.98%. In Perrault's final election as leader in 1966, the party won an additional seat, and a modest increase in the vote to 20.24%.

He remained an MLA until he resigned in 1968 to enter federal politics in the 1968 federal election. He won a seat in the House of Commons of Canada as a Liberal Member of Parliament (MP), defeating New Democratic Party leader Tommy Douglas by just 138 votes, earning him the nickname "Landslide Ray". He was defeated in the next election in 1972.

Perrault was appointed to the Senate by Prime Minister Pierre Trudeau in October 1973. A year later, he joined the cabinet as Leader of the Government in the Senate.

When the Liberals lost power in the 1979 election, Perrault became Leader of the Opposition in the Senate. He resumed his position as government leader when the Liberals returned to power in the 1980 election. In 1982, he was reassigned to the position of Minister of State for Fitness and Amateur Sport, and served in that position until leaving the cabinet in August 1983.

He remained in the Senate until his retirement in 2001.

Perrault served on the board of the Terry Fox Foundation. A lifelong follower of sports, Perrault served as a director of the Vancouver Canucks and honorary chairman of the Vancouver Canadians baseball team. In the 1980s, he was part of a failed effort to bring a Major League Baseball team to Vancouver.

He died on November 24, 2008, at the age of 82, leaving behind his wife Barbara and their three children.

20th Canadian Ministry (1968–1979) – First cabinet of Pierre Trudeau
Cabinet post (1)
Predecessor	Office	Successor
Paul Martin Sr.	Leader of the Government in the Senate; 1974–1979	Jacques Flynn
22nd Canadian Ministry (1980–1984) – Second cabinet of Pierre Trudeau
Cabinet post (1)
Predecessor	Office	Successor
Jacques Flynn	Leader of the Government in the Senate; 1980–1982	Bud Olson
Government offices
Preceded by Jacques Flynn	Leader of the Opposition in the Senate of Canada; 1979–1980	Succeeded by Jacques Flynn
