= Douglas Tynwald Kelly =

Canadian politician

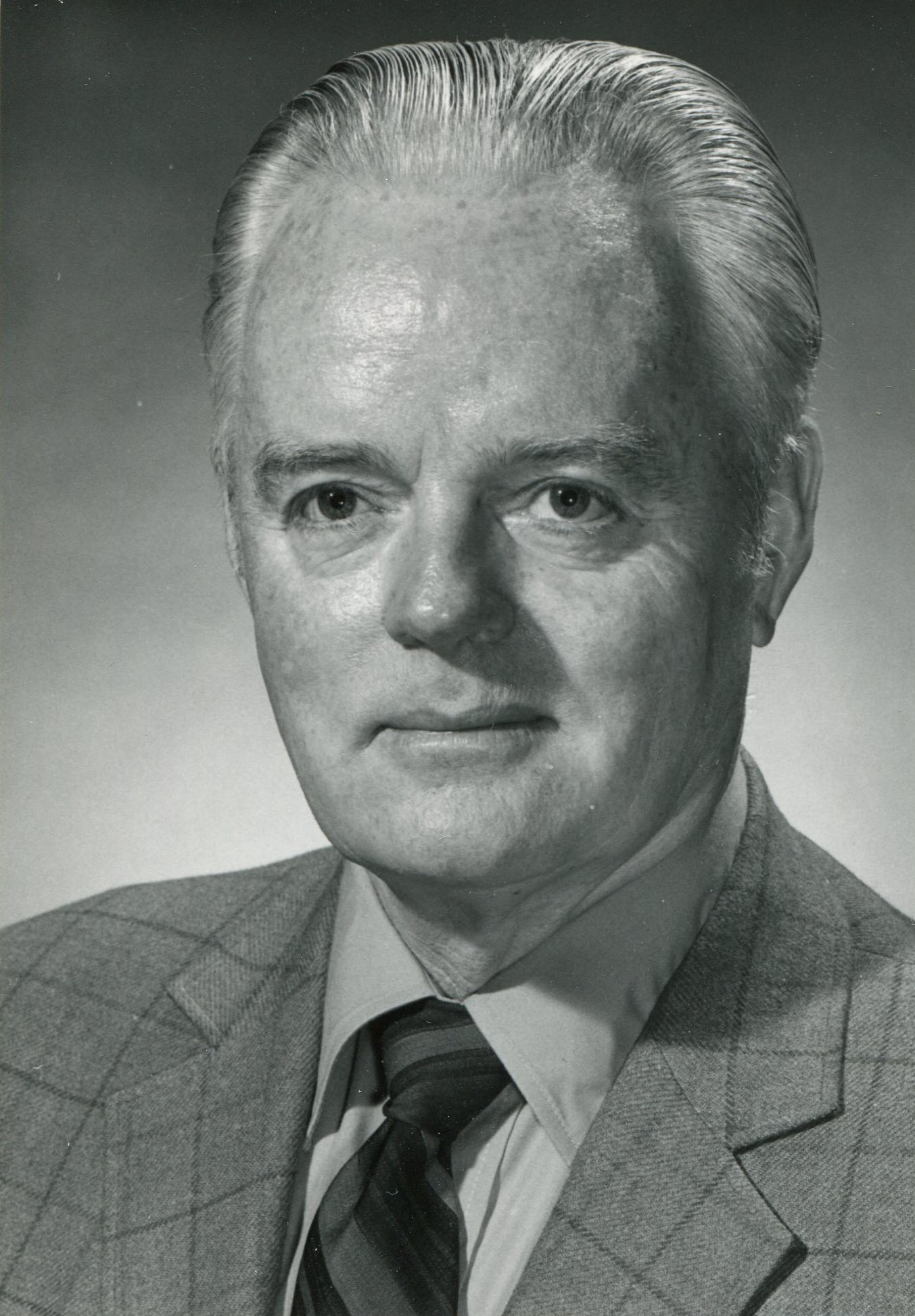

MLA for Omineca
- In office 1972–1975

Personal details
- Born: July 21, 1920 Revelstoke, British Columbia
- Died: January 10, 2006 (aged 85) British Columbia, Canada
- Party: British Columbia New Democratic Party
- Spouse: Dorothy Elizabeth Greig

Douglas Tynwald Kelly (July 21, 1920 – January 10, 2006) was a Canadian politician. After being defeated in the 1969 provincial election, he served in the Legislative Assembly of British Columbia from 1972 to 1975, as a NDP member for the constituency of Omineca.
