= Don Lockstead =

Canadian politician

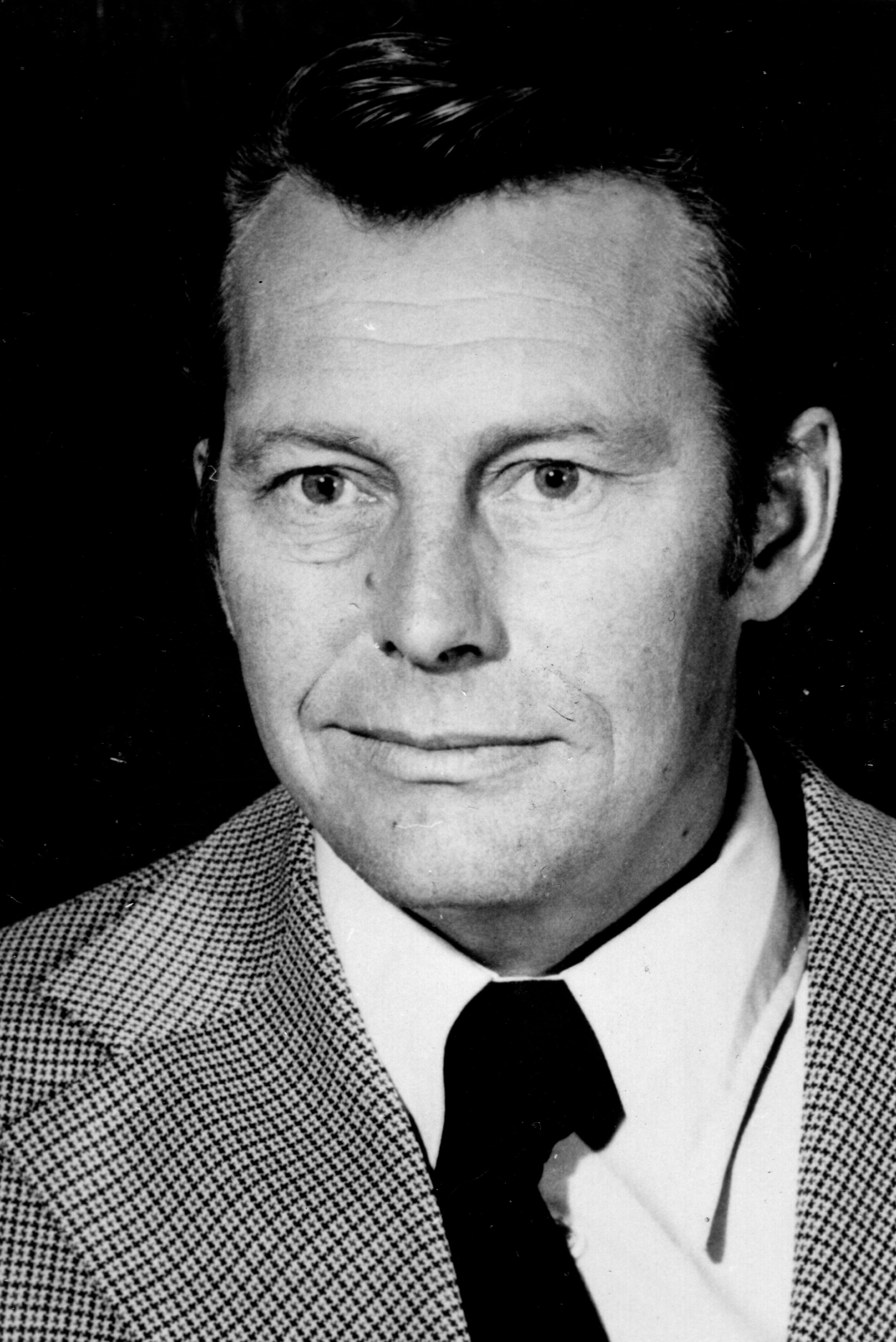

Donald Frederick Lockstead (November 21, 1931 – April 13, 1998) was a plant superintendent and political figure in British Columbia. After being defeated in the 1969 provincial election, he represented Mackenzie from 1972 to 1986 as a New Democrat.

He was born in Leduc, Alberta, the son of Daniel Lockstead and Ida Latt. Lockstead was defeated by Harold Long when he ran for reelection to the provincial assembly in 1986. He served as mayor of Powell River, British Columbia.
