= Jacob Francis Huhn =

Canadian politician

MLA for North Peace River
- In office 1960–1966
- Preceded by: Harold Earl Roche
- Succeeded by: Ed Smith

Personal details
- Born: August 6, 1919 Bruno, Saskatchewan
- Died: February 15, 1977 (aged 57) Fort St. John, British Columbia
- Party: Social Credit Party of British Columbia

Jacob Francis Huhn (August 6, 1919 – February 15, 1977) was a Canadian politician. He served in the Legislative Assembly of British Columbia from 1960 to 1966, initially as a Social Credit member and then as an independent member for the constituency of North Peace River. He died in 1977.
