= Mackenzie (provincial electoral district) =

Defunct provincial electoral district in British Columbia, Canada

Mackenzie was a provincial electoral district in the Canadian province of British Columbia. It elected one member to the Legislative Assembly of British Columbia. The district was abolished as the result of a redistribution under the Electoral Districts Act, 1990, and replaced with Powell River-Sunshine Coast.

== Members elected 1969–1987 ==
Year	Name	Party
1986	Harold Long	Social Credit
1983	Don Lockstead	NDP
1979	Don Lockstead	NDP
1975	Don Lockstead	NDP
1972	Don Lockstead	NDP
1969	Isabel Dawson	Social Credit

== Election results 1924–1966 ==
28th British Columbia election, 1966
Party	Candidate	Votes	%	±	Expenditures
Social Credit	Isabel Dawson	4945	52.7%	–	unknown
New Democratic	Anthony Gargrave	3586	38.2%		unknown
Liberal	Benner	855	9.1%		unknown
Total valid votes		9386	100.00%		
Total rejected ballots		90			
Turnout		66.9%			

27th British Columbia election, 1963
Party	Candidate	Votes	%	±	Expenditures
New Democratic	Anthony Gargrave	4323	41.6%		unknown
Social Credit	Dawson	3920	37.7%	–	unknown
Liberal	McCluskey	2147	20.7%		unknown
Total valid votes		10,390	100.00%		
Total rejected ballots		90			
Turnout		67.8%			

26th British Columbia election, 1960
Party	Candidate	Votes	%	±	Expenditures
New Democratic	Anthony Gargrave	4952	46.4%		unknown
Social Credit	Bracewell	3167	29.7%	–	unknown
Liberal	McCloskey	2058	19.3%		unknown
Progressive Conservative	Moon	487	4.6%		unknown
Total valid votes		10,664	100.00%		
Total rejected ballots		132			
Turnout		66.6%			

25th British Columbia election, 1956
Party	Candidate	Votes	%	±	Expenditures
Co-operative Commonwealth Fed.	Anthony Gargrave	4502	48.4%		unknown
Social Credit	Muir	3246	34.9%	–	unknown
Liberal	Mainil	1362	14.6%		unknown
Progressive Conservative	Moon	189	2.0%		unknown
Total valid votes		9299	100.00%		
Total rejected ballots		89			
Turnout		63.5%			

24th British Columbia election, 1953 ^{2}
Party	Candidate	Votes 1st count	%	Votes final count	%	±%	
Co-operative Commonwealth Fed.	Anthony Gargrave	4468	41.4%	5191	53.6%		unknown
Liberal	B. Milton MacIntyre	3397	31.5%	4497	46.4%		unknown
Social Credit	Perdu	2,687	24.9%				
Progressive Conservative	Dawe	230	2.1%	--	--.--%		unknown
Total valid votes		10,782	100.00%	9688	%		
Total rejected ballots		440					
Turnout		72.8%					
^{2}Preferential ballot: 1st and 3rd counts of Three shown only)

23rd British Columbia election, 1952 ^{2}
Party	Candidate	Votes 1st count	%	Votes final count	%	±%	
Co-operative Commonwealth Fed.	Anthony Gargrave	4230	38.2%	5373	53.5%		unknown
Liberal	B. Milton MacIntyre	3752	33.9%	4669	46.5%		unknown
Social Credit	Gresty	1,795	16.2%				
Progressive Conservative	Eckhardt	1285	11.6%	--	--.--%		unknown
Total valid votes		11,062	100.00%	10,042	%		
Total rejected ballots		347					
Turnout		67.1%					
^{2}Preferential ballot: 1st and 3rd counts of Three shown only)

22nd British Columbia election, 1949
Party	Candidate	Votes	%	±	Expenditures
Coalition	B. Milton MacIntyre	5787	55.6%	–	unknown
Co-operative Commonwealth Fed.	Herbert Gargrave	4626	44.4%		unknown
Total valid votes		10,413	100.00%		
Total rejected ballots		315			
Turnout		77.7%			

21st British Columbia election, 1945
Party	Candidate	Votes	%	±	Expenditures
Co-operative Commonwealth Fed.	Herbert Gargrave	2961	52.3%		unknown
Coalition	Thomson	2313	40.8%	–	unknown
Labor-Progressive	Campbell	293	5.2%		unknown
Social Credit	Mulligan	106	1.9%	–	unknown
Total valid votes		5673	100.00%		
Total rejected ballots		315			
Turnout		66.7%			

20th British Columbia election, 1941
Party	Candidate	Votes	%	±	Expenditures
Co-operative Commonwealth Fed.	Herbert Gargrave	2909	45.8%		unknown
Liberal	McGeer	2079	32.7%		unknown
Conservative	Young	1370	21.5%		unknown
Total valid votes		6358	100.00%		
Total rejected ballots		97			
Turnout		65.9%			

18th British Columbia election, 1937
Party	Candidate	Votes	%	±	Expenditures
Liberal	John Melvin Bryan. Sr.	1828	33.9%		
Conservative	McIntyre	1661	30.8%		
Co-operative Commonwealth Fed.	Herbert Gargrave	1625	30.2%		
Social Constructive	Robertson	152	2.8%		
Social Credit	Creer	122	2.3%		
Total valid votes		5388	100.00%		
Total rejected ballots		315			
Turnout		70.8%			

17th British Columbia election, 1933
Party	Candidate	Votes	%	±	Expenditures
Co-operative Commonwealth Fed.	Ernest Bakewell	2071	43.6%		unknown
Liberal	Castillou	1386	29.2%		unknown
Non-Partisan Independent Group	MacGregor	1292	27.2%	–	unknown
Total valid votes		4749	100.00%		
Total rejected ballots		214			
Turnout		67.5%			

16th British Columbia election, 1928
Party	Candidate	Votes	%	±	Expenditures
Conservative	Michael Manson	1266	51.0%		unknown
Liberal	William J. Heath	1215	49.0%		unknown
Total valid votes		2481	100.00%		
Total rejected ballots		51			
Turnout		65.1%			

15th British Columbia election, 1924
Party	Candidate	Votes	%	±	Expenditures
Conservative	Michael Manson	742	41.5%		unknown
Liberal	Duncan G. McKay	647	36.2%		unknown
Provincial	Charles H. Leicester	401	22.4%		unknown
Total valid votes		1790	100.00%		
Total rejected ballots		—			
Turnout		55.6%			

== See also ==
- List of British Columbia provincial electoral districts
- Canadian provincial electoral districts
