= Edward Fraser Rowland =

Canadian politician

Edward Fraser "Ted" Rowland
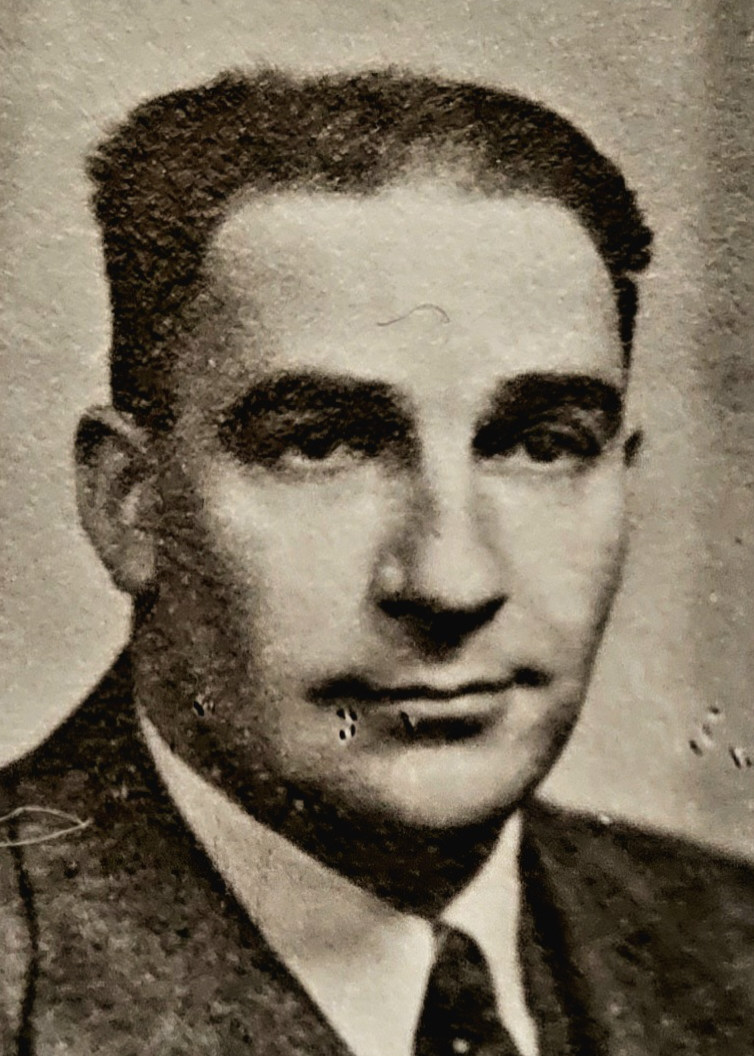

MLA for Omineca
- In office 1945–1949

Personal details
- Born: November 13, 1911 Victoria, British Columbia, Canada
- Died: January 4, 2004 (aged 92) British Columbia, Canada
- Party: Co-operative Commonwealth Federation
- Spouse(s): Mary Kathleen Mould (m. 1933–2001; her death)

Edward Fraser Rowland (November 13, 1911 – January 4, 2004) was a farmer, miner, logger and political figure in British Columbia. He represented Omineca in the Legislative Assembly of British Columbia from 1945 to 1949 as a Co-operative Commonwealth Federation (CCF) member.

He was born in Victoria, British Columbia, the son of English parents, and was educated there and in northern British Columbia. The family later moved to Rose Lake. Rowland served overseas during World War II. He was defeated when he ran for reelection in 1949 and again in the 1953 provincial election. Rowland served as postmaster for Rose Lake. He later moved to Burns Lake. In 1972, Rowland was named a director for BC Hydro. He married Mary Kathleen Mould in 1933.
