= William Harvey Murray =

Canadian politician

Member of the British Columbia Legislative Assembly for Prince Rupert
- In office September 19, 1956 – July 18, 1972
- Preceded by: Arthur Bruce Brown
- Succeeded by: Graham Lea

Personal details
- Born: William Harvey Murray; September 2, 1916 Wallyford, Scotland
- Died: July 7, 1991 (aged 74) Victoria, British Columbia
- Party: BC Social Credit
- Spouse: Gwyneth Margaret Walker

William Harvey Murray (September 2, 1916 – July 7, 1991) was a Canadian politician who served a member of the Legislative Assembly of British Columbia representing the riding of Prince Rupert from 1956 to 1972 as a member of the Social Credit Party.

He was born in Wallyford, a community on the outskirts of Edinburgh, Scotland, the son of Robert Kirkwood Murray and Agnes Gordon Harvey. Murray was a clerk with the British Columbia Forest Service, owned and managed the Crest Hotel in Prince Rupert and also worked as an accountant. He served in the Royal Canadian Navy during World War II. In 1946, he married Gwyneth Margaret Walker. He ran unsuccessfully for a seat in the British Columbia assembly in 1953. Murray was speaker for the British Columbia assembly from 1964 to 1972. He was defeated by Graham Lea when he ran for reelection in 1972.

He died in 1991 of lung cancer.
