= Ed Smith (Canadian politician) =

Canadian politician (1928–2010)

D. Ed Smith

Member of the Legislative Assembly of British Columbia
- In office 1966–1979
- Preceded by: Jacob Francis Huhn
- Succeeded by: Anthony Brummet
- Constituency: Peace River North

25th Speaker of the Legislative Assembly of British Columbia
- In office 1976–1978
- Preceded by: Gordon Dowding
- Succeeded by: Harvey Schroeder

Personal details
- Born: Dean Edward Smith; October 21, 1928 Champion, Alberta, Canada
- Died: April 28, 2010 (aged 81) Fort St. John, British Columbia, Canada
- Party: British Columbia Social Credit Party
- Spouse: Barbara Pennock (m. 1978)
- Education: University of Toronto
- Occupation: Chartered Life Underwriter

Dean Edward Smith (October 21, 1928 – April 28, 2010), known as Ed Smith, was a Canadian politician the province of in British Columbia. He represented Peace River North in the Legislative Assembly of British Columbia from 1966 to 1979 as a Social Credit member.

== Life and career ==
Smith was born in Champion, Alberta in 1928, the son of Dean Allen Smith and Linna Florence Boyd, and was educated in Calgary and the University of Toronto, qualifying as a Chartered Life Underwriter. Smith was president of the Peace River Underwriters Club and served on the town council for Fort St. John. In 1973, he ran for the leadership of the Social Credit party. He was speaker for the British Columbia assembly from 1976 to 1978. Smith resigned his position of speaker when criticism followed the appointment of his former secretary Barbara Pennock to the auditor general's office. He married Miss Pennock in August 1978. Smith died in Fort St. John, British Columbia on April 28, 2010, at the age of 81.
