= Omineca (electoral district) =

Defunct provincial electoral district in British Columbia, Canada

Omineca was a provincial electoral district of the Canadian province of British Columbia. It first appeared on the hustings in the general election of 1916.

== Electoral history ==
14th British Columbia election, 1916
Party	Candidate	Votes	%	±	Expenditures
Liberal	Alexander Malcolm Manson	473	62.16%		unknown
Conservative	Frank Maurice Dockrill	288	37.84%		unknown
Total valid votes		761	100.00%		
Total rejected ballots					
Turnout		%			

15th British Columbia election, 1920
Party	Candidate	Votes	%	±	Expenditures
Liberal	Alexander Malcolm Manson	630	60.87%		unknown
Conservative	George L. Murray	273	26.38%		unknown
Independent	Alexander James Prudhomme	78	7.54%		unknown
Independent	Joseph S. Kelly	54	5.22%		unknown
Total valid votes		1,035	100.00%		
Total rejected ballots					
Turnout		%			

16th British Columbia election, 1924
Party	Candidate	Votes	%	±	Expenditures
Liberal	Alexander Malcolm Manson	592	44.08%		unknown
Provincial	Arthur Shelford	453	33.73%	–	unknown
Conservative	Samuel Williams Cocker	298	22.19%		unknown
Total valid votes		1,343	100.00%		
Total rejected ballots					
Turnout		%			

17th British Columbia election, 1928
Party	Candidate	Votes	%	±	Expenditures
Liberal	Alexander Malcolm Manson	889	57.21%		unknown
Conservative	Arthur Shelford	665	42.79%		unknown
Total valid votes		1,554	100.00%		
Total rejected ballots		20			
Turnout		%			

18th British Columbia election, 1933
Party	Candidate	Votes	%	±	Expenditures
Liberal	Alexander Malcolm Manson	1,079	52.23%		unknown
Co-operative Commonwealth Fed.	Arthur Edward Windle	538	26.04%		unknown
Non-Partisan Independent Group	Samuel Williams Cocker	355	17.18%	–	unknown
Independent	Louis Denison Taylor	94	4.55%		unknown
Total valid votes		2,066	100.00%		
Total rejected ballots		35			
Turnout		%			

British Columbia by-election, June 22, 1936
Party	Candidate	Votes	%	±	Expenditures
Liberal	Mark Matthew Connelly	899	48.75%		unknown
Co-operative Commonwealth Fed.	Sidney Godwin	697	37.80%		unknown
Conservative	Alfred Thompson	248	13.45%		unknown
Total valid votes		1,844	100.00%		
Total rejected ballots					
Turnout		%			

Reason for by-election: Resignation of A. M. Manson on September 14, 1935, to contest federal election (Vancouver South, October 14, 1935).

19th British Columbia election, 1937
Party	Candidate	Votes	%	±	Expenditures
Liberal	Mark Matthew Connelly	1,013	50.90%		unknown
Co-operative Commonwealth Fed.	Sidney Godwin	783	39.35%		unknown
Conservative	George Samuel Belsham	194	9.75%		unknown
Total valid votes		1,990	100.00%		
Total rejected ballots		37			
Turnout		%			

20th British Columbia election, 1941
Party	Candidate	Votes	%	±	Expenditures
Liberal	Mark Matthew Connelly	839	49.50%		unknown
Co-operative Commonwealth Fed.	William David Menzies	554	32.68%		unknown
Conservative	Albert Kenzie Hemstreet	302	17.82%		unknown
Total valid votes		1,695	100.00%		
Total rejected ballots		48			
Turnout		%			

21st British Columbia election, 1945
Party	Candidate	Votes	%	±	Expenditures
Co-operative Commonwealth Fed.	Edward Fraser Rowland	932	51.58%		unknown
Coalition	Mark Matthew Connelly	875	48.42%	–	unknown
Total valid votes		1,807	100.00%		
Total rejected ballots		36			
Turnout		%			

22nd British Columbia election, 1949
Party	Candidate	Votes	%	±	Expenditures
Coalition	Robert Cecil Steele	1,885	61.60%	–	unknown
Co-operative Commonwealth Fed.	Edward Fraser Rowland	1,175	38.40%		unknown
Total valid votes		3,060	100.00%		
Total rejected ballots		83			
Turnout		%			

23rd British Columbia election, 1952 ^{1}
Party	Candidate	Votes 1st count	%	Votes final count	%	±%
Social Credit League	Cyril Morley Shelford	1,137	31.17%	1,607	52.79%	
Liberal	Robert Cecil Steele	1,099	30.13%	1,437	47.21%	
Co-operative Commonwealth Fed.	Warden Randle Taylor	838	22.97%	-	%	
Progressive Conservative	George Ogston	574	15.73%	--	--.--%	
Total valid votes		3,648	100.00%	3,044	%	
Total rejected ballots		132				
Turnout		%				
^{1}(Preferential ballot: 1st and 3rd counts of three shown only)

24th British Columbia election, 1953 ^{2}
Party	Candidate	Votes 1st count	%	Votes final count	%	±%
Social Credit League	Cyril Morley Shelford	1,390	37.99%	1,612	53.90%	
Liberal	Robert Cecil Steele	1,145	31.29%	1,379	46.10%	
Co-operative Commonwealth Fed.	Edward Fraser Rowland	952	26.02%	-	%	
Progressive Conservative	Samuel Williams Cocker	172	4.70%	--	--.--%	
Total valid votes		3,659	100.00%	2,991	%	
Total rejected ballots		175				
Turnout		%				
^{2}Preferential ballot: 1st and 3rd counts of Three shown only)

25th British Columbia election, 1956
Party	Candidate	Votes	%	±	Expenditures
Social Credit	Cyril Morley Shelford	1,685	54.06%	–	unknown
Liberal	Joseph Norman Leslie	847	27.17%		unknown
Co-operative Commonwealth Fed.	George Johnson McInnis	585	18.77%		unknown
Total valid votes		3,117	100.00%		
Total rejected ballots		52			
Turnout		%			

26th British Columbia election, 1960
Party	Candidate	Votes	%	±	Expenditures
Social Credit	Cyril Morley Shelford	1,633	45.88%	–	unknown
Co-operative Commonwealth Fed.	Ivan Everett Holmes	1,119	31.44%		unknown
Liberal	Marguerite Clarice Deeder	529	14.86%		unknown
Progressive Conservative	Karl Peter Frederiksen	278	7.81%		unknown
Total valid votes		3,559	100.00%		
Total rejected ballots		64			
Turnout		%			

27th British Columbia election, 1963
Party	Candidate	Votes	%	±	Expenditures
Social Credit	Cyril Morley Shelford	1,936	55.09%	–	unknown
New Democrat	Robert Fred Langford	779	22.17%		unknown
Liberal	Richard M. McCallum	528	15.03%		unknown
Progressive Conservative	Philip Pickering	271	7.71%		unknown
Total valid votes		3,514	100.00%		
Total rejected ballots		51			
Turnout		%			

28th British Columbia election, 1966
Party	Candidate	Votes	%	±	Expenditures
Social Credit	Cyril Morley Shelford	2,337	70.16%	–	unknown
New Democrat	Cornelius Bergen	994	29.84%		unknown
Total valid votes		3,331	100.00%		
Total rejected ballots		172			
Turnout		%			

29th British Columbia election, 1969
Party	Candidate	Votes	%	±	Expenditures
Social Credit	Cyril Morley Shelford	3,252	61.00%	–	unknown
New Democrat	Douglas Tynwald Kelly	1,607	30.14%		unknown
Liberal	Michael Chunys	472	8.85%		unknown
Total valid votes		5,331	100.00%		
Total rejected ballots		72			
Turnout		%			

30th British Columbia election, 1972
Party	Candidate	Votes	%	±	Expenditures
New Democrat	Douglas Tynwald Kelly	2,600	39.68%		unknown
Social Credit	Cyril Morley Shelford	2,418	36.90%	–	unknown
Progressive Conservative	Charles Irving Beck	1,018	15.53%		unknown
Liberal	Darrell Frederick Cursons	517	7.89%		unknown
Total valid votes		6,553	100.00%		
Total rejected ballots		101			
Turnout		%			

31st British Columbia election, 1975
Party	Candidate	Votes	%	±	Expenditures
Social Credit	Jack Joseph Kempf	5,228	58.04%	–	unknown
New Democrat	Douglas Tynwald Kelly	2,776	30.82%		unknown
Liberal	Basil Edward Studer	1,003	11.14%		unknown
Total valid votes		9,007	100.00%		
Total rejected ballots		111			
Turnout		%			

32nd British Columbia election, 1979
Party	Candidate	Votes	%	±	Expenditures
Social Credit	Jack Joseph Kempf	5,830	58.34%	–	unknown
New Democrat	Russell Frederick Anderson	4,163	41.66%		unknown
Total valid votes		9,993	100.00%		
Total rejected ballots		199			
Turnout		%			

33rd British Columbia election, 1983
Party	Candidate	Votes	%	±	Expenditures
Social Credit	Jack Joseph Kempf	6,722	55.77%	–	unknown
New Democrat	Bruce Thomas Kanary	4,164	34.54%		unknown
Western Canada Concept	Clyde William Nunn	1,006	8.35%		unknown
Liberal	David Anthony Seiler	162	1.34%		unknown
Total valid votes		12,054	100.00%		
Total rejected ballots		168			
Turnout		%			

44th British Columbia election, 1986
Party	Candidate	Votes	%	±	Expenditures
Social Credit	Jack Joseph Kempf	6,586	60.53%	–	unknown
New Democrat	Louise B. Kilby	4,295	39.47%		unknown
Total valid votes		10,881	100.00%		
Total rejected ballots		154			
Turnout		%			

== See also ==
- List of British Columbia provincial electoral districts
- Canadian provincial electoral districts
