= Cyril Morley Shelford =

Canadian politician (1921–2001)

Cyril Shelford

Member of the British Columbia Legislative Assembly for Skeena
- In office December 11, 1975 – May 10, 1979
- Preceded by: Hartley Douglas Dent
- Succeeded by: Frank Howard

Member of the British Columbia Legislative Assembly for Omineca
- In office June 12, 1952 – August 30, 1972
- Preceded by: Robert Cecil Steele
- Succeeded by: Douglas Tynwald Kelly

Personal details
- Born: April 8, 1921 Southbank, British Columbia
- Died: November 8, 2001 (aged 80) Victoria, British Columbia
- Party: Social Credit
- Spouse: Barbara Cassidy (1948-2001)
- Occupation: Rancher

Military service
- Allegiance: Canada
- Branch/service: Canadian Army
- Unit: 1st Canadian Division
- Battles/wars: World War II

Cyril Morley Shelford (April 8, 1921 – November 8, 2001) was Canadian politician, rancher, and author who served as a member of the Legislative Assembly of British Columbia (MLA) representing the riding of Omineca from 1952 to 1972 and then Skeena from 1975 to 1979 as a member of the Social Credit Party.

== Biography ==
He was born in Southbank, British Columbia, the son of Jack Shelford. Shelford served as an anti-aircraft gunner during World War II. After the war, he married Barbara Cassidy. Shelford was a member of the provincial cabinet, serving as Minister of Agriculture from 1968 to 1972 and then again in 1978 and 1979. He was defeated when he ran for reelection to the assembly in 1972 and 1979. He died in 2001.

Shelford published a number of books:

- From Snowshoes To Politics ISBN 0-920501-09-5
- We Pioneered ISBN 0-920501-19-2
- From War To Wilderness ISBN 1-55056-533-8
- Think Wood!: The Forest Is An Open Book; All We Have To Do Is Read It ISBN 0-9697713-0-4
