= Donald James Campbell =

Canadian politician (1932–1984)

Donald James Campbell (November 23, 1932 – June 10, 1984) was a businessman and political figure in British Columbia. He represented Okanagan North in the Legislative Assembly of British Columbia from 1983 to 1984 as a Social Credit member.

He was born in Kinistino, Saskatchewan, the son of Raymond Campbell and Lena Waddell, and was educated in Penticton, British Columbia. In 1977, he married Isabel Huchak. Campbell was an alderman for Vernon from 1968 to 1970. He served as secretary for the B.C. Interior Fruit Stand Association from 1965 to 1983. He died in office at the age of 51.
