= Stanley Carnell =

Canadian politician (1903–1989)

MLA for South Peace River
- In office 1956–1966

Personal details
- Born: October 14, 1903 Sheffield, Yorkshire, England
- Died: December 29, 1989 (aged 86) Saanichton, British Columbia, Canada
- Party: Social Credit Party of British Columbia

Stanley Carnell (October 14, 1903 – December 29, 1989) was a Canadian politician. He served in the Legislative Assembly of British Columbia from 1956 to 1966, as a Social Credit member for the constituency of South Peace River.
