= Willis Franklin Jefcoat =

Canadian politician

MLA for Salmon Arm
- In office 1960–1966

MLA for Shuswap
- In office 1966–1972

Personal details
- Born: September 3, 1908 Cheyenne, Oklahoma, United States
- Died: November 4, 2001 (aged 93) Enderby, British Columbia, Canada
- Party: Social Credit Party of British Columbia

Willis Franklin Jefcoat (September 3, 1908 – November 4, 2001) was a Canadian politician. He served in the Legislative Assembly of British Columbia from 1960 to 1972, as a Social Credit member for the constituencies of Salmon Arm and Shuswap.
