= Anthony Gargrave =

Canadian politician (1926–1998)

MLA for Mackenzie
- In office 1952–1966

Personal details
- Born: June 16, 1926 London, England, United Kingdom
- Died: January 7, 1998 (aged 71) British Columbia, Canada
- Party: British Columbia New Democratic Party

Anthony John Gargrave (June 16, 1926 – January 7, 1998) was an English-born logger, lawyer and political figure in British Columbia. He represented Mackenzie in the Legislative Assembly of British Columbia from 1952 to 1966 as a Co-operative Commonwealth Federation (CCF) and then New Democratic Party (NDP) member.

He was born in London in 1926 and, in 1940, was sent to Canada to live with his brother Herbert (who represented the Mackenzie district in the Legislature between 1941 and 1949) during the bombardment of London. Gargrave continued his education in Vancouver, British Columbia. In 1945, he went overseas with the Canadian Army. After the war, he worked in lumber camps in British Columbia. He was defeated when he ran for reelection to the assembly in 1966. While serving in the assembly, Gargrave studied at Victoria College and the University of British Columbia, completing a law degree. After retiring from politics, he practised law in Vancouver and Gibson's Landing. He died January 7, 1998.
