= Okanagan North (provincial electoral district) =

Defunct provincial electoral district in British Columbia, Canada

Okanagan North was a provincial electoral district in British Columbia, Canada, beginning with the election of 1979.

== See also ==
- List of British Columbia provincial electoral districts
- Canadian provincial electoral districts
- List of electoral districts in the Okanagan
