= Prince Rupert (electoral district) =

Defunct provincial electoral district in British Columbia, Canada

Prince Rupert was a provincial electoral district of British Columbia, Canada. It made its first appearance on the hustings in the election of 1916 and its last in the 1986 election. Its main successor ridings are North Coast and Skeena.

== Notable MLAs ==
The first electoral race in this riding is its most significant — the electoral debut of Thomas Dufferin "Duff" Pattullo, 22nd Premier of British Columbia, 1933–1941.

== History ==
The Prince Rupert riding was redistributed after the 1986 election. Successor ridings include:

- North Coast
- Skeena
- Bulkley Valley-Stikine

== See also ==
- List of British Columbia provincial electoral districts
- Canadian provincial electoral districts

Legislative Assembly of British Columbia
Preceded by Saanich	Constituency represented by the Premier of British Columbia; 1933–1941	Succeeded by Victoria City
