= 30th Parliament of British Columbia =

Diagram of the 30th Parliament of British Columbia NDP: 38 seats Social Credit: 10 seats Liberal: 5 seats Progressive Conservative: 2 seats

The 30th Legislative Assembly of British Columbia sat from 1972 to 1975. The members were elected in the British Columbia general election held in August 1972. The New Democratic Party (NDP) led by Dave Barrett formed the government, and the Social Credit Party led by W. A. C. Bennett formed the official opposition. Bill Bennett was elected Social Credit party leader in November 1973 after his father resigned his seat in the assembly in June 1973.

Gordon Dowding served as speaker for the assembly.

== Members of the 30th Parliament ==
The following members were elected to the assembly in 1972:

Member	Electoral district	Party	First elected / previously elected	No.# of term(s)
Robert Evans Skelly	Alberni	NDP	1972	1st term
Frank Arthur Calder	Atlin	NDP	1949, 1960	8th term*
Frank Arthur Calder	Atlin	Social Credit	1949, 1960	8th term*
Francis Xavier Richter	Boundary-Similkameen	Social Credit	1953	7th term
Gordon Dowding	Burnaby-Edmonds	NDP	1956	6th term
Eileen Dailly	Burnaby North	NDP	1966	3rd term
James Gibson Lorimer	Burnaby-Willingdon	NDP	1969	3rd term
Alexander Vaughan Fraser	Cariboo	Social Credit	1969	2nd term
Harvey Schroeder	Chilliwack	Social Credit	1972	1st term
James Roland Chabot	Columbia River	Social Credit	1963	4th term
Karen Elizabeth Sanford	Comox	NDP	1972	1st term
David Barrett	Coquitlam	NDP	1960	5th term
Robert Martin Strachan	Cowichan-Malahat	NDP	1952	8th term
Carl Liden	Delta	NDP	1972	1st term
Peter Rolston	Dewdney	NDP	1972	1st term
James Henry Gorst	Esquimalt	NDP	1972	1st term
Allan Alfred Nunweiler	Fort George	NDP	1972	1st term
Gerald Hamilton Anderson	Kamloops	NDP	1972	1st term
Leo Thomas Nimsick	Kootenay	NDP	1949	9th term
Robert Howard McClelland	Langley	Social Credit	1972	1st term
Don Lockstead	Mackenzie	NDP	1972	1st term
David Daniel Stupich	Nanaimo	NDP	1963, 1972	3rd term*
Lorne Nicolson	Nelson-Creston	NDP	1972	1st term
Dennis Geoffrey Cocke	New Westminster	NDP	1969	2nd term
Patricia Jordan	North Okanagan	Social Credit	1966	3rd term
Dean Edward Smith	North Peace River	Social Credit	1966	3rd term
David Maurice Brousson	North Vancouver-Capilano	Liberal	1968	3rd term
Gordon Fulerton Gibson (1974)	North Vancouver-Capilano	Liberal	1974	1st term
Colin Gabelmann	North Vancouver-Seymour	NDP	1972	1st term
George Scott Wallace	Oak Bay	Progressive Conservative	1969 (Note: First elected as a Social Credit)	2nd term
Douglas Tynwald Kelly	Omineca	NDP	1972	1st term
Graham Lea	Prince Rupert	NDP	1972	1st term
William Stewart King	Revelstoke-Slocan	NDP	1968, 1972	2nd term*
Harold Leslie Steves	Richmond	NDP	1972	1st term
Christopher D'Arcy	Rossland-Trail	NDP	1972	1st term
Hugh Austin Curtis	Saanich and the Islands	Progressive Conservative	1972	1st term
Hugh Austin Curtis	Saanich and the Islands	Social Credit	1972	1st term
Donald Emerson Lewis	Shuswap	NDP	1972	1st term
Hartley Douglas Dent	Skeena	NDP	1972	1st term
William Andrew Cecil Bennett	South Okanagan	Social Credit	1941, (Note: First elected as a Conservative) 1949	11th term*
William Richards Bennett (1973)	South Okanagan	Social Credit	1973	1st term
Donald McGray Phillips	South Peace River	Social Credit	1966, 1972	2nd term*
Ernest Hall	Surrey	NDP	1966	3rd term
Rosemary Brown	Vancouver-Burrard	NDP	1972	1st term
Norman Levi	Vancouver-Burrard	NDP	1968, (Note: Vancouver South) 1972	2nd term*
Emery Oakland Barnes	Vancouver Centre	NDP	1972	1st term
Gary Lauk	Vancouver Centre	NDP	1972	1st term
Alexander Barrett MacDonald	Vancouver East	NDP	1960	5th term
Robert Arthur Williams	Vancouver East	NDP	1966	3rd term
Roy Thomas Cummings	Vancouver-Little Mountain	NDP	1972	1st term
Phyllis Florence Young	Vancouver-Little Mountain	NDP	1972	1st term
Garde Basil Gardom	Vancouver-Point Grey	Liberal	1966	3rd term
Garde Basil Gardom	Vancouver-Point Grey	Independent	1966	3rd term
Garde Basil Gardom	Vancouver-Point Grey	Social Credit	1966	3rd term
Patrick Lucey McGeer	Vancouver-Point Grey	Liberal	1962	5th term
Patrick Lucey McGeer	Vancouver-Point Grey	Independent	1962	5th term
Patrick Lucey McGeer	Vancouver-Point Grey	Social Credit	1962	5th term
Jack A. Radford	Vancouver South	NDP	1972	1st term
Daisy Webster	Vancouver South	NDP	1972	1st term
David Alexander Anderson	Victoria	Liberal	1972	1st term
Newell Orrin Ruston Morrison	Victoria	Social Credit	1972	1st term
Louis Allan Williams	West Vancouver-Howe Sound	Liberal	1966	3rd term
Louis Allan Williams	West Vancouver-Howe Sound	Independent	1966	3rd term
Louis Allan Williams	West Vancouver-Howe Sound	Social Credit	1966	3rd term
William Leonard Hartley	Yale-Lillooet	NDP	1963	4th term

== Party standings ==
Affiliation	Members
New Democratic	38
Social Credit	10
Liberal	5
Progressive Conservative	2
Total	55
Government Majority	21

== By-elections ==
By-elections were held to replace members for various reasons:

Electoral district	Member elected	Party	Election date	Reason
South Okanagan	William Richards Bennett	Social Credit	September 7, 1973	W. A. C. Bennett resigned June 5, 1973; retired from politics
North Vancouver-Capilano	Gordon Fulerton Gibson	Liberal	February 5, 1974	D.M. Brousson resigned October 23, 1973, to look after business interests

== Other changes ==
- Hugh Austin Curtis joins Social Credit October 25, 1974.
- Patrick McGeer and Allan Williams become Independents on May 9, 1975; they were followed by Garde Gardom on May 20. On September 30 all three join Social Credit.
- Cowichan-Malahat (res. Robert Strachan October 5, 1975)
