= North Vancouver-Capilano =

Defunct provincial electoral district in British Columbia, Canada

North Vancouver-Capilano was a provincial electoral district in the Canadian province of British Columbia from 1966 until 1991, when it was dissolved and partitioned into West Vancouver-Capilano, North Vancouver-Seymour and North Vancouver-Lonsdale. The riding's predecessor was North Vancouver, which first appeared on the hustings from 1903.

== Electoral history ==
28th British Columbia election, 1966
Party	Candidate	Votes	%	±	Expenditures
Liberal	Ray Perrault	6,426	51.49%		unknown
Social Credit	Kenwood Pugsley	3,976	31.86%	–	unknown
New Democratic	Martin Sidney Toren	1,816	14.55%		unknown
Progressive Conservative	Donald Clarke Paterson	261	2.09%		unknown
Total valid votes		12,479	100.00%		
Total rejected ballots		96			
Turnout		%			

By-election, July 15, 1968
Party	Candidate	Votes	%	±	Expenditures
Liberal	David Maurice Brousson	5,578	53.61%		unknown
Social Credit	Peter Edward Robinson	3,090	29.70%	–	unknown
New Democrat	Sidney Bernard Simons	1,265	12.16%		unknown
Progressive Conservative	Charles Rankin Maclean	435	4.18%		unknown
Communist	James William (Jim) Beynon	36	0.35%		unknown
Total valid votes		10,404	100.00%		
Total rejected ballots		55			
Turnout		%			

Reason for by-election: Resignation of R. J. Perrault on June 5, 1968, to contest federal election (Burnaby-Seymour, June 25, 1968).

29th British Columbia election, 1969
Party	Candidate	Votes	%	±	Expenditures
Liberal	David Maurice Brousson	7,175	48.32%		unknown
Social Credit	Lorne Albert Montaine	5,084	34.24%	–	unknown
New Democrat	Allan Jarvis Duplissie	2,591	17.45%		unknown
Total valid votes		14,850	100.00%		
Total rejected ballots		93			
Turnout		%			

30th British Columbia election, 1972
Party	Candidate	Votes	%	±	Expenditures
Liberal	David Maurice Brousson	6,851	39.54%		unknown
Social Credit	William Lee Wallace	3,530	20.37%	–	unknown
Progressive Conservative	Jacob Brouwer	3,526	20.35%		unknown
New Democratic	Leslie McDonald	3,421	19.74%		unknown
Total valid votes		17,328	100.00%		
Total rejected ballots		123			
Turnout		%			

By-election, February 5, 1974
Party	Candidate	Votes	%	±	Expenditures
Liberal	Gordon Fulerton Gibson	4,736	31.11%		unknown
Social Credit	Ronald Clayton Andrews	4,679	30.74%	–	unknown
Progressive Conservative	Peter Stewart Hyndman	3,151	20.70%		unknown
New Democratic	Diane Mackenzie Baigent	2,637	17.32%		unknown
Christian Democratic	Norman Gareth Dent	19	0.13%		
Total valid votes		15,222	100.00%		
Total rejected ballots		84			
Turnout		%			

Reason for by-election: Resignation of D. M. Brousson on October 23, 1973, to look after his business interests.

31st British Columbia election, 1975
Party	Candidate	Votes	%	±	Expenditures
Liberal	Gordon Fulerton Gibson	8,836	44.74%		unknown
Social Credit	Ronald Clayton Andrews	8,530	43.19%	–	unknown
New Democratic	Michael Ian Copes	2,383	12.07%		unknown
Total valid votes		19,749	100.00%		
Total rejected ballots		230			
Turnout		%			

32nd British Columbia election, 1979
Party	Candidate	Votes	%	±	Expenditures
Social Credit	Angus Creelman Ree	13,247	55.73%	–	unknown
New Democratic	Michael Ian Copes	7,139	30.03%		unknown
Liberal	Frank Carlton Warburton	1,805	7.59%		unknown
Progressive Conservative	William James Nichol	1,579	6.65%		unknown
Total valid votes		23,770	100.00%		
Total rejected ballots		455			
Turnout		%			

33rd British Columbia election, 1983
Party	Candidate	Votes	%	±	Expenditures
Social Credit	Angus Creelman Ree	16,280	62.11%	–	unknown
New Democratic	Olga Kempo	8,507	32.46%		unknown
Liberal	L. Jean Driscoll-Bell	1,424	5.43%		unknown
Total valid votes		26,211	100.00%		
Total rejected ballots		241			
Turnout		%			

34th British Columbia election, 1986
Party	Candidate	Votes	%	±	Expenditures
Social Credit	Angus Creelman Ree	14,359	56.62%	–	unknown
New Democratic	Olga Kempo	7,757	30.59%		unknown
Liberal	Mike Edward Downing	3,022	11.92%		unknown
Libertarian	Bill Tomlinson	220	0.87%		
Total valid votes		25,358	100.00%		
Total rejected ballots		388			
Turnout		%			

== See also ==
- List of British Columbia provincial electoral districts
- Canadian provincial electoral districts
- Vancouver (electoral districts)
