= Vancouver South (provincial electoral district) =

Defunct provincial electoral district in British Columbia, Canada

Vancouver South was a provincial electoral district of British Columbia, Canada. It was created in time for the general election of 1966 and last appeared in the general election of 1986. It returned two members of the Legislative Assembly of British Columbia.

== Electoral history ==
1966 British Columbia general election
Party	Candidate	Votes	%	Elected
Social Credit	Ralph Raymond Loffmark	12,259	22.79	✓
Social Credit	Thomas Audley Bate	11,740	21.83	✓
New Democratic	Norman Levi	9,067	16.86	
New Democratic	Joseph Harold Warnock	8,843	16.44	
Liberal	James Ronald Grant	5,698	10.59	
Liberal	Richard Gordon Hepworth	5,675	10.55	
Independent	Howard Leonard Faulkner	502	0.93	
Total valid votes		53,784		
Total rejected ballots		387		

British Columbia provincial by-election, 21 May 1968 called because of death of T. A. Bate on September 21, 1967.
Party	Candidate	Votes	%
New Democratic	Norman Levi	10,289	39.57
Social Credit	George Wainborn	8,309	31.96
Liberal	Edward Alastair (Sandy) Robertson	7,356	28.29
RPC	Leonard Sprackman	48	0.18
Total valid votes		26,002	
Total rejected ballots		194	

1969 British Columbia general election
Party	Candidate	Votes	%	Elected
Social Credit	Ralph Raymond Loffmark	15,154	23.69	✓
Social Credit	Agnes Kripps	14,233	22.25	✓
New Democratic	Norman Levi	11,259	17.60	
New Democratic	John Noel Laxton	10,523	16.45	
Liberal	Edward Alastair Sandy Robertson	6,670	10.43	
Liberal	Michael Henry Hornby Tytherleigh	6,059	9.47	
Independent	Suraj Singh Sander	80	0.13	
Total valid votes		63,978		
Total rejected ballots		393		

1972 British Columbia general election
Party	Candidate	Votes	%	Elected
New Democratic	Jack A. Radford	14,010	20.46	✓
New Democratic	Daisy Webster	13,821	20.18	✓
Social Credit	Agnes Kripps	11,263	16.45	
Social Credit	Ralph Raymond Loffmark	11,215	16.38	
Liberal	Helen Demetra Boyce	6,501	9.49	
Liberal	Frederick Newton A. Rowell	6,247	9.12	
Progressive Conservative	Walter J. Boytinck	2,744	4.01	
Progressive Conservative	Mildred (Millie) MacKinnon	2,684	3.92	
Total valid votes		68,485		
Total rejected ballots		432		

1975 British Columbia general election
Party	Candidate	Votes	%	Elected
Social Credit	Charles Stephen Rogers	18,711	26.08	✓
Social Credit	William Gerald Strongman	18,559	25.86	✓
New Democratic	Jack A. Radford	14,260	19.87	
New Democratic	Michael Franklin Harcourt	14,213	19.81	
Liberal	Gordon Joseph Chambers	2,100	2.93	
Liberal	Richard Lyle Johannson	1,988	2.77	
Progressive Conservative	Clare Walker	854	1.19	
Progressive Conservative	Peter Guy Westlake	833	1.16	
Communist	Bruce Stevens	169	0.24	
Communist	Samuel Vint	67	0.09	
Total valid votes		71,754		
Total rejected ballots		390		

1979 British Columbia general election
Party	Candidate	Votes	%	Elected
Social Credit	Charles Stephen Rogers	19,741	26.68	✓
Social Credit	Peter Stewart Hyndman	19,665	26.58	✓
New Democratic	James Edgar Duvall	15,258	20.62	
New Democratic	Ujjal Dev Singh Dosanjh	14,123	19.09	
Progressive Conservative	Peter Guy Westlake	2,066	2.79	
Progressive Conservative	David Nigel Kilbey	2,045	2.76	
Liberal	Roger Schmidt	859	1.16	
Marxist–Leninist	Amarjit Singh Dhillon	154	0.21	
Marxist–Leninist	Allen Harvey Soroka	81	0.11	
Total valid votes		73,992		
Total rejected ballots		875		

1983 British Columbia general election
Party	Candidate	Votes	%	Elected
Social Credit	Russell Gordon Fraser	22,206	27.48	✓
Social Credit	Charles Stephen Rogers	22,171	27.43	✓
New Democratic	Joyce Ellen Whitman	17,306	21.42	
New Democratic	Ujjal Dev Singh Dosanjh	15,291	18.92	
Liberal	Harry Bernard Cobin Hammer	3,843	4.75	
Total valid votes		80,817		
Total rejected ballots		727		

1986 British Columbia general election
Party	Candidate	Votes	%	Elected
Social Credit	Russell Gordon Fraser	21,325	27.44	✓
Social Credit	Charles Stephen Rogers	20,872	26.86	✓
New Democratic	Elain Duvall	17,414	22.41	
New Democratic	Gavin B. Craig	17,227	22.17	
People's Front	Charles R. Boylan	513	0.66	
People's Front	Harbhajan S. Cheema	355	0.46	
Total valid votes		77,706		
Total rejected ballots		1,550		

== See also ==
- List of British Columbia provincial electoral districts
- Canadian provincial electoral districts
- Vancouver (electoral districts)
