= Jack Radford =

Canadian football player and politician

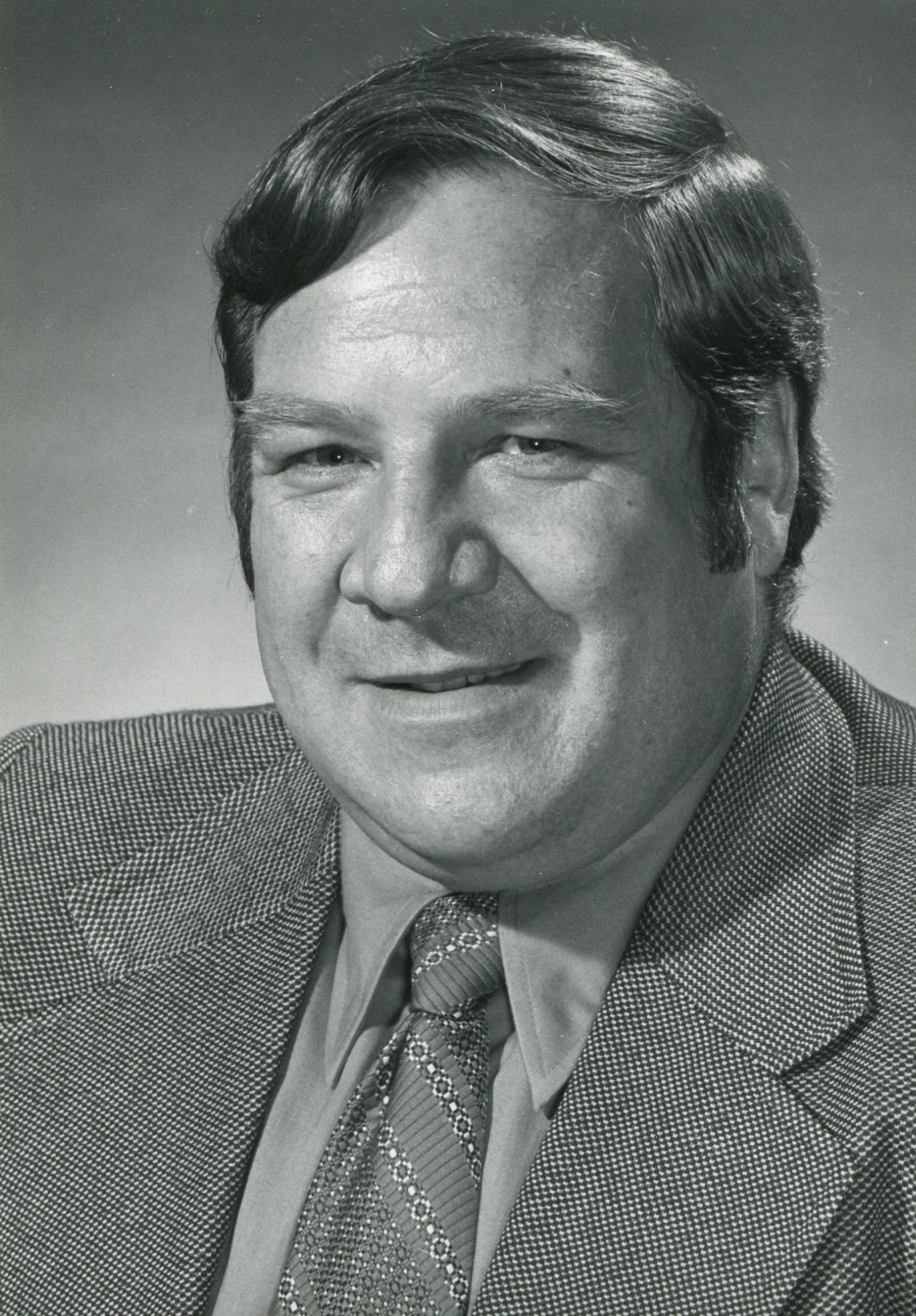

Member of the British Columbia Legislative Assembly for Vancouver South
- In office August 30, 1972 – December 11, 1975 Serving with Daisy Webster
- Preceded by: Ralph Raymond Loffmark; Agnes Kripps
- Succeeded by: Stephen Rogers; William Gerald Strongman

Personal details
- Born: November 4, 1929 Nanaimo, British Columbia
- Died: May 19, 2003 (aged 73) Victoria, British Columbia
- Party: British Columbia New Democratic Party
- Spouse: Marie Ann Kaczmarski

Jack Alvin Radford (November 4, 1929 – May 19, 2003) was a Canadian politician. He served in the Legislative Assembly of British Columbia from 1972 to 1975, as a NDP member for the constituency of Vancouver South. He served as Minister of Recreation and Conservation from May 18, 1973 to December 22, 1975. He died of cancer in 2003.

He played a season with the BC Lions when they were first organized and with the Edmonton Eskimos until knee injuries side-lined him. He began trap shooting in the 1950s and won the BC Championship twice, as well as titles in the United States. He worked 20 years for Swift's Meats in Vancouver. He accepted a position with the International Woodworkers of America, then went on to become a representative for the Canadian Labour Congress.
