= Peter Hyndman =

Canadian politician and lawyer

Member of the British Columbia Legislative Assembly for Vancouver South
- In office May 10, 1979 – May 5, 1983
- Preceded by: William Gerald Strongman
- Succeeded by: Russell Fraser

Personal details
- Born: October 9, 1941 Edmonton, Alberta
- Died: September 6, 2006 (aged 64) Vancouver, British Columbia
- Cause of death: Cancer
- Party: Liberal; Social Credit (1975-1983); Progressive Conservative (1970-1975)
- Occupation: Lawyer

Peter Stewart Hyndman (October 9, 1941– September 6, 2006) was a Canadian politician and lawyer.

Hyndman graduated from law at the University of British Columbia and studied economics at Harvard University. He was the MLA for Vancouver South from 1979 to 1983, and was Minister of Consumer and Corporate Affairs from January 6, 1981 to August 10, 1982 in the cabinet of Bill Bennett. He was forced out of office by an expense-account scandal in 1982. Hyndman died of cancer at the age of 64.

The Vancouver Bar Association awards the Peter S. Hyndman Mentorship Award each year for a lawyer who has distinguished himself as a mentor to younger lawyers.
