= Art Lee =

Canadian politician (born 1947)

Arthur John Lee
- 李僑棟
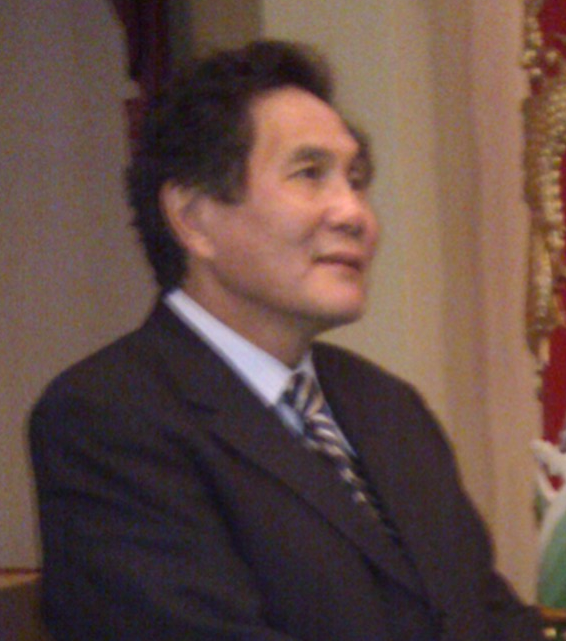
- Art Lee in 2011

Member of Parliament for Vancouver East
- In office July 8, 1974 – May 21, 1979
- Preceded by: Paddy Neale
- Succeeded by: Margaret Mitchell

Leader of the British Columbia Liberal Party
- In office March 31, 1984 – October 30, 1987
- Preceded by: Shirley McLoughlin
- Succeeded by: Gordon Wilson

Personal details
- Born: September 30, 1947 (age 79) Lethbridge, Alberta, Canada
- Party: British Columbia Liberal Party; Liberal Party of Canada
- Education: University of Alberta Faculty of Law
- Profession: Lawyer
- Portfolio: Parliamentary Secretary to the Solicitor General of Canada (1976–1977); Parliamentary Secretary to the Minister of Consumer and Corporate Affairs (1975–1976)

Art Lee
- Traditional Chinese: 李僑棟
- Simplified Chinese: 李侨栋
Transcriptions
Standard Mandarin
- Hanyu Pinyin: Lǐ Qiáodòng
Yue: Cantonese
- Jyutping: Lei5 Kiu4 Dung6

Arthur John Lee (Chinese: 李僑棟; born September 30, 1947) is a Canadian politician and lawyer based in British Columbia. He served as a Liberal Party of Canada member of Parliament (MP) representing Vancouver East from 1974 to 1979, and as the leader of the British Columbia Liberal Party from 1984 to 1987, becoming the first Chinese Canadian to lead a provincial or federal political party.

== Background ==
Art Lee was born in Lethbridge, Alberta. His father Wilson Lee (b. 19 February 1919), ran a business in Edmonton after serving in the Royal Canadian Air Force, and his great-grandfather worked as a translator during the construction of the Canadian Pacific Railway. His paternal aunt Jean Lee was the only woman of Chinese-Canadian descent to serve in the Royal Canadian Air Force's (RCAF) Women’s Division during World War II. After graduating from the University of Alberta Faculty of Law in 1972, he was called to the bar in British Columbia in 1973, and joined the law firm of Frank Lew in Vancouver.

As a fourth-generation Chinese Canadian, Art Lee was not fluent in the Chinese language. After becoming MP, he took Cantonese lessons to facilitate communications with Chinese residents in his constituency.

== Political career ==
=== Federal politics ===
Lee ran as a candidate of the Liberal Party of Canada in the 1974 federal election, winning the riding of Vancouver East against incumbent New Democratic Party (NDP) candidate Paddy Neale by just 57 votes. He served as parliamentary secretary to the Minister of Consumer and Corporate Affairs from 1975 to 1976, and as parliamentary secretary to the Solicitor General of Canada from 1976 to 1977. In the subsequent 1979 election, he lost the seat to NDP candidate Margaret Mitchell, and again in 1980.

=== Provincial politics ===
After Shirley McLoughlin resigned as leader of the British Columbia Liberal Party in 1983, Lee won the leadership election in 1984 against three opponents. At that time, the party had little popular support due to its association with the federal Liberals, and it held no seats in the British Columbia Legislative Assembly. Lee attempted to enter the legislature by running in the Vancouver East by-election on November 8, 1984, but lost to British Columbia New Democratic Party candidate Bob Williams.

In the 1986 provincial election, Lee ran for one of two seats in Vancouver-Little Mountain alongside fellow Liberal candidate Joyce Statton; the seats were won by incumbent Social Credit candidates Grace McCarthy and Doug Mowat. The Liberals were once again shut out of the legislature, but the party won 6.74% of the popular vote, more than double what they had received in the 1983 election. Thereafter Lee announced his resignation as party leader, staying on until Gordon Wilson was acclaimed as the new Liberal leader in October 1987.

== Election results ==
=== Provincial ===
1986 British Columbia general election: Vancouver-Little Mountain
Party	Candidate	Votes	%	Elected
Social Credit	Grace Mary McCarthy	18,049	22.15	✓
Social Credit	Doug Mowat	15,962	19.58	✓
New Democratic	Colin Patrick Kelly	15,717	19.28	
New Democratic	Adrienne Hazel Peacock	15,407	18.90	
Liberal	Arthur John "Art" Lee	10,627	13.04	
Liberal	Joyce E. Statton	5,498	6.75	
People's Front	Dorothy Jean O'Donnell	128	0.16	
People's Front	Allan H. Bezanson	111	0.14	
Total valid votes		81,499	100.00	
Total rejected ballots		1,219		
Turnout				

British Columbia provincial by-election, November 8, 1984: Vancouver East Resignation of Dave Barrett
Party	Candidate	Votes	%
New Democratic	Bob Williams	12,857	55.50
Liberal	Arthur John "Art" Lee	6,287	27.14
Social Credit	Mario Caravetta	3,743	16.16
Green	Hans-Joachim Grages	200	0.86
Independent	David John Ford	79	0.34
Total valid votes		23,166	100.00
Total rejected ballots		364	
Turnout		23,530	

=== Federal ===
1980 Canadian federal election: Vancouver East
Party	Candidate	Votes	%	±%
New Democratic	Margaret Anne Mitchell	14,245	43.91	+1.21
Liberal	Arthur John "Art" Lee	12,979	40.01	+0.97
Progressive Conservative	David N. Kilbey	4,742	14.62	-1.92
Rhinoceros	Dandy Randy Lyttle	198	0.61	–
Communist	J. Fred Wilson	179	0.55	+0.02
Independent	Paul Tetreault	61	0.19	–
Marxist–Leninist	Chaouac Ferron	34	0.10	-0.03
Total valid votes		32,438	100.0	
New Democratic hold		Swing		+0.12

1979 Canadian federal election: Vancouver East
Party	Candidate	Votes	%	±%
New Democratic	Margaret Anne Mitchell	13,697	42.71	+6.44
Liberal	Arthur John "Art" Lee	12,522	39.04	+2.57
Progressive Conservative	Cecil H. Leng	5,304	16.54	-8.91
Social Credit	Carlo Dallavalle	334	1.04	–
Communist	J. Fred Wilson	170	0.53	-0.59
Marxist–Leninist	Brian K. Sproule	44	0.14	-0.55
Total valid votes		32,071	100.0	
New Democratic gain from Liberal		Swing		+1.94

1974 Canadian federal election: Vancouver East
Party	Candidate	Votes	%	±%
Liberal	Arthur J. "Art" Lee	9,671	36.48	+5.13
New Democratic	C.P. Paddy Neale	9,614	36.26	-12.55
Progressive Conservative	Hartley Hubbs	6,747	25.45	+8.91
Communist	Maurice Rush	298	1.12	+0.38
Marxist–Leninist	Charles Boylan	181	0.68	–
Total valid votes		26,511	100.0	
Liberal gain from New Democratic		Swing		+8.84

== See also ==
- List of electoral firsts in Canada
- Chinese Canadians in Greater Vancouver
