= Jean Lee (aircraftwoman) =

Canadian veteran of World War II (1924–2024)

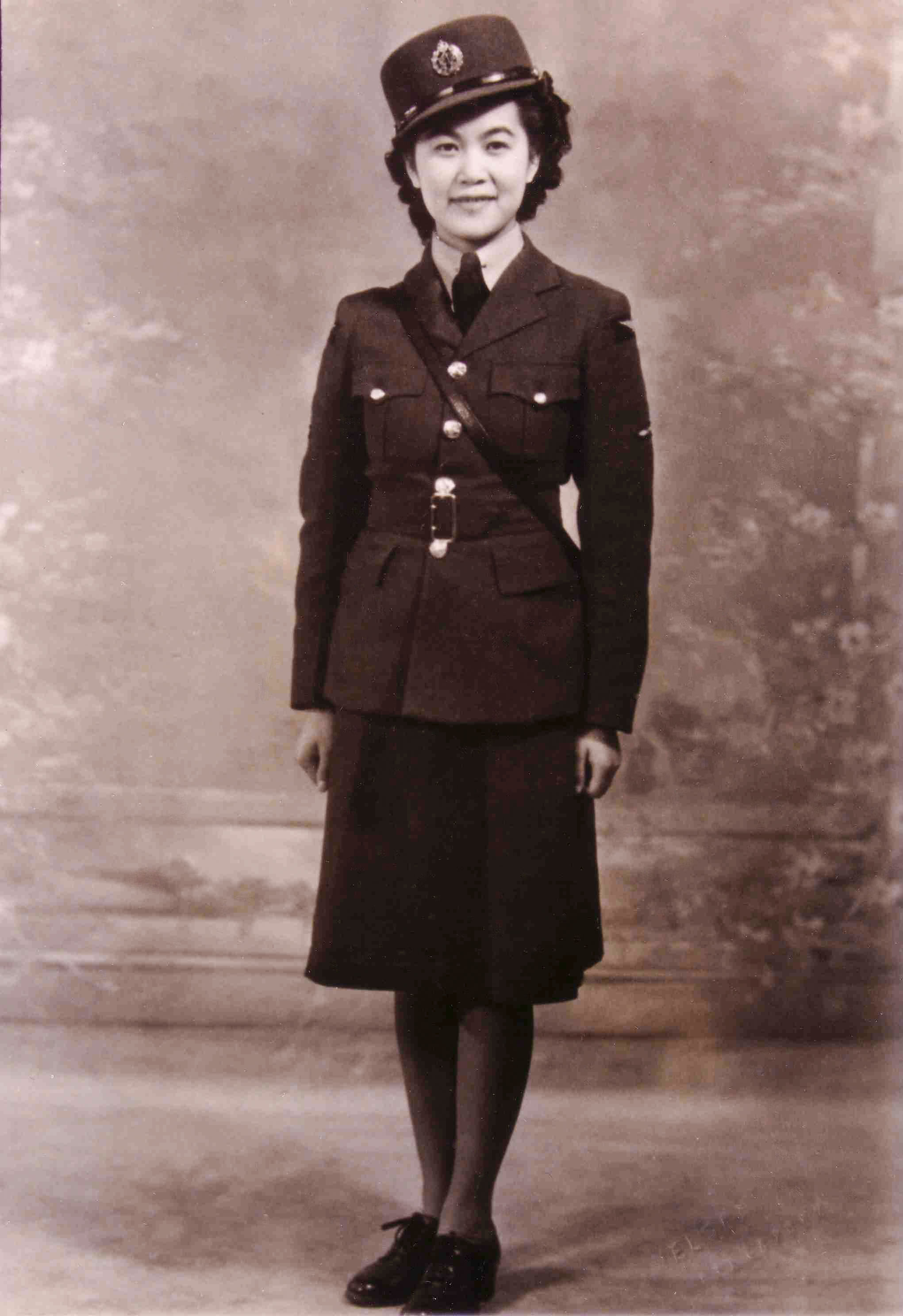
- AC1 Jean Lee
- Born: July 26, 1924; Cranbrook, British Columbia, Canada
- Died: May 2, 2023 (aged 98); Montgomery County, Maryland, U.S.
- Military career
- Allegiance: Canada
- Branch: Royal Canadian Air Force
- Service years: 1942–1945
- Conflicts: World War II

Jean Suey Zee Lew (née Lee; July 26, 1924 – May 2, 2023) was a Canadian veteran of World War II and the only woman of Chinese-Canadian descent to serve in the Royal Canadian Air Force's (RCAF) Women’s Division.

== Early life ==
Lee was born in Cranbrook, British Columbia on July 26, 1924, to Lee Look (Chow Man) and Huey Shee Lee. One of nine siblings, she had two brothers who also served in the military – Wilson John Lee who served with training command at Fort Macleod, and William, who served in the Korean War. Her paternal grandfather John Lee had immigrated to Canada from China in the early 1900s and settled in the Chinatown area of Cranbrook, running a general store until his death in 1925. Her father Lee Look had been 12 when he arrived with his father, and spent some time in China before returning to Canada. He became a successful shop owner and invested in property.

== Royal Canadian Air Force Women's Division ==
Lee enlisted in the Royal Canadian Air Force in 1942 when a Mobile Recruiting Unit visited Cranbrook. This was the first year that the Canadian military accepted volunteers of Chinese heritage.

After undergoing basic training in Toronto, Lee was stationed from 1942 to 1945 at the Royal Canadian Air Force Depot, Eastern Air Command, at Rockcliffe, Ontario. She was the only Chinese-Canadian to be accepted into the Royal Canadian Air Force Women's Division during World War II. The division was made up of over 17,000 women.

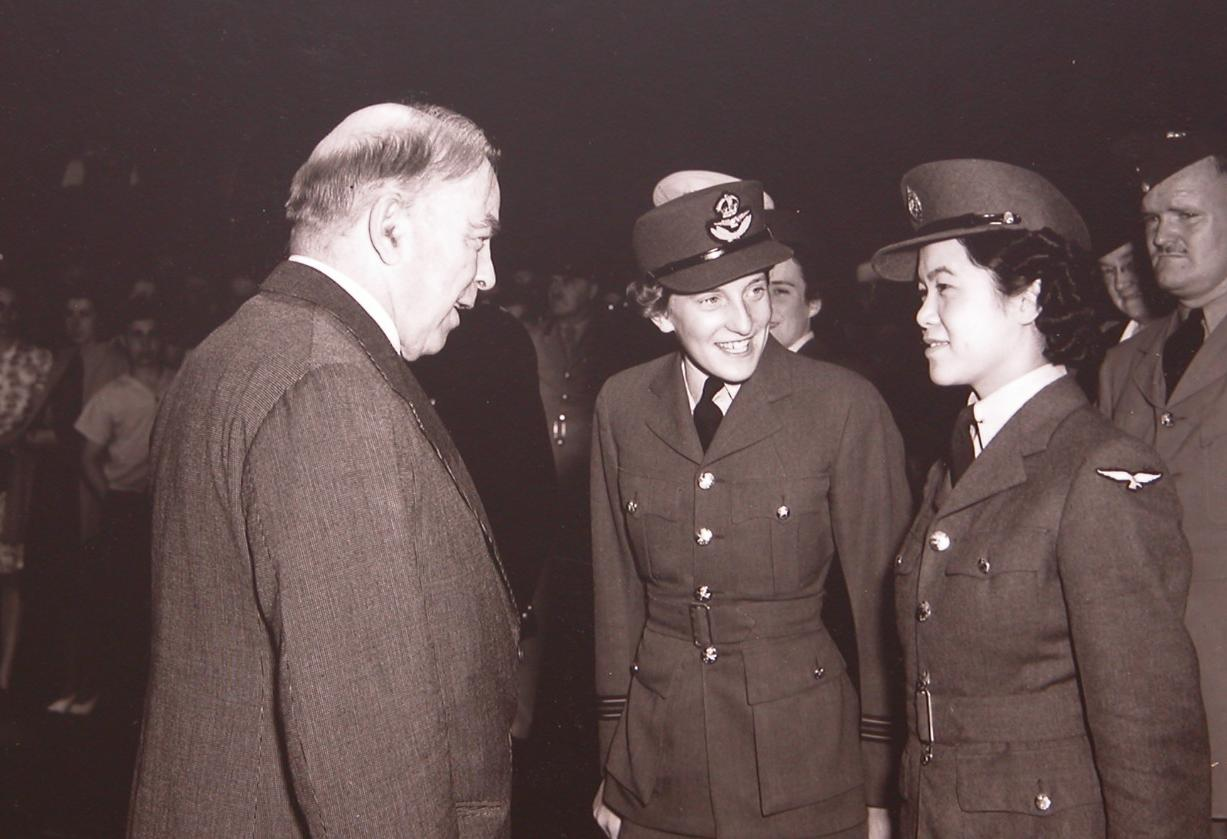
Lee (right) meets with William Lyon Mackenzie King, 1943

In 1943, Lee met Prime Minister Mackenzie King. In June she was a member of the honour guard for Soong Mei-ling (Madame Chiang Kai-Shek), wife of the Chinese President when she visited Ottawa, and the Chinese First Lady spoke with her at length.

== Post-war ==
Lee was awarded her Canadian Citizenship Certificate in a ceremony in February 1947, along with 6 other veterans. She was one of the first women of Chinese descent to become a Canadian citizen. From 1874, Chinese Canadians had been restricted from Canadian citizenship under a number of laws, including the Chinese Immigration Act, 1885 and the 1923 Chinese Exclusion Act, which was repealed after Canada signed the Universal Declaration of Human Rights.

As of 2023, Lee lived a "very private" life residing in Washington D.C. Her nephew Art Lee was the first Chinese Canadian to lead a provincial or federal political party, leading the British Columbia Liberal Party from 1984 to 1987. She died on May 2, 2023, in Montgomery County, Maryland, at the age of 98.

== Bibliography ==
- Wong, Marjorie (1994). The Dragon and the Maple Leaf: Chinese Canadians in World War II. Pirie Publishing. pp. 51–52. ISBN 0-9698086-0-7.
