= Angus Creelman Ree =

Canadian politician and lawyer

Angus Ree QC

Member of the British Columbia Legislative Assembly for North Vancouver-Capilano
- In office May 10, 1979 – October 17, 1991
- Preceded by: Gordon Gibson
- Succeeded by: Jeremy Dalton

Personal details
- Born: August 28, 1929 Vancouver, British Columbia, Canada
- Died: October 9, 2009 (aged 80) White Rock, British Columbia, Canada
- Party: Social Credit
- Profession: Lawyer

Angus Creelman Ree (August 28, 1929 – October 9, 2009) was a lawyer and political figure in British Columbia. He represented North Vancouver-Capilano in the Legislative Assembly of British Columbia from 1979 to 1991 as a Social Credit member.

== Biography ==
He was born in Vancouver, British Columbia, the son of Alex Ree and Carolyn Eleanor Creelman, and was educated at the University of British Columbia. Ree served in the Canadian Army from 1952 to 1958. He was married twice, first to Anita Rose Schneeberger in 1957 and then to Cheri Ann Kingsland in 1973. Ree served in the provincial cabinet as the first Solicitor General of British Columbia.
