= British Columbia Liberal Party leadership elections =

This page lists the results of leadership conventions of the British Columbia Liberal Party, known since 2023 as BC United.

Winners are listed first, in bold, and prefaced by.

== 1902 leadership convention ==
Held February 6, 1902.

- **Joseph Martin** 47
- William Wallace Burns McInnes 17
- John Cunningham Brown 8
- George Ritchie Maxwell 4
- Scattering 14

(Source: "Canadian Annual Review 1902", p. 85)

== 1903 election by party caucus ==
Joseph Martin resigned as Liberal leader on June 2, 1903. Following his personal defeat in the 1903 general election, the first on a partisan basis, James Alexander MacDonald was elected leader by a party caucus on October 19, 1903.

First ballot:

- Stuart Alexander Henderson 5
- James Alexander MacDonald 5
- William Wallace Burns McInnes 5

Second ballot:

- William Wallace Burns McInnes 6
- MacDONALD, James Alexander 5
- Stuart Alexander Henderson 4

Third ballot (Runoff between McInnes and MacDonald):

- James Alexander MacDonald 11
- William Wallace Burns McInnes 4

Fourth ballot (McInnes eliminated):

- **James Alexander MacDonald** 10
- Stuart Alexander Henderson 4

(Source: "Canadian Annual Review 1903", pgs. 222–223)

== Developments 1909–1912 ==
John Oliver was elected leader by a meeting of the caucus and provincial executive October 10, 1909.

== 1912 leadership convention ==
Held March 1, 1912

- **Harlan Carey Brewster** (acclaimed)

== 1918 election by party caucus ==
On March 5, 1918, John Oliver was elected leader on the fourth ballot, defeating James Horace King and John Wallace de Beque Farris. William Sloan and John Duncan MacLean were eliminated on previous ballots.

- **John Oliver**
- James Horace King
- John Wallace de Begue Farris
- William Sloan
- John Duncan MacLean

Source: "Morning Leader", March 6, 1918

== Developments 1927–1930 ==
At a party caucus on July 18, 1927, John Oliver resigned as premier and party leader due to ill health. This was refused and John Duncan MacLean was chosen to be his successor as leader and premier and was made acting premier while Oliver remained nominal premier. Oliver died on August 17, 1927, and MacLean became premier on August 20.

Source: "Morning Leader", July 19, 1927

Following John Duncan MacLean's personal defeat in the 1928 general election Thomas Dufferin Pattullo was unanimously chosen House leader by the Liberal caucus on January 19, 1929. This was confirmed by the party executive on January 21, 1929. He was confirmed as permanent leader at a subsequent convention.

Source: "Vancouver Sun", January 21, 1929

== 1930 leadership convention ==
Held May 30, 1930

- **Thomas Dufferin Pattullo** (acclaimed)

Source: "Montreal Gazette", May 31, 1930

== 1941 leadership convention ==
Held December 2, 1941

- **John Hart** (acclaimed)

Source: "The Leader Post", December 3, 1941

== 1947 leadership convention ==
Held December 10, 1947

- **Byron Ingemar Johnson** 475
- Gordon Sylvester Wismer 467

Source: "Saskatoon Star-Phoenix", December 11, 1947

== 1953 leadership convention ==
Held April 8, 1953

- **Arthur Laing** (acclaimed)

Source: "Vancouver Sun", April 9, 1953

== 1959 leadership convention ==
Held on May 16, 1959

- **Ray Perrault** 494
- George Frederick Thompson Gregory 162

Source: "Montreal Gazette", May 19, 1959

== 1968 leadership convention ==
Held on October 5, 1968

- **Pat McGeer** 686
- Garde Gardom 316

Source: The Leader-Post, October 7, 1968)

== 1972 leadership convention ==
Held on May 22, 1972

- **David Anderson** 388
- Bill Vander Zalm 177

== 1975 leadership convention ==
Held on September 28, 1975, in Burnaby, British Columbia

- **Gordon Gibson** (acclaimed)

== 1979 leadership convention ==
Held on February 19, 1979

- **Jev Tothill** 250
- Hugh Chesley 51

(Source: Globe and Mail, February 19, 1979)

== 1981 leadership convention ==
Held on May 25, 1981

- **Shirley McLoughlin** 195
- Tom Finkelstein 146
- Roland Bouwman 48

(Note: There were six spoiled ballots.)

== 1984 leadership convention ==
Held on March 31, 1984, in Richmond, British Columbia

- **Art Lee** 319
- Stan Roberts 126
- William Pryhitko 43
- Ron Biggs 36

== 1987 leadership convention ==
Held on October 30, 1987, in Richmond, British Columbia

- **Gordon Wilson** (acclaimed)

One other candidate, Clive Tanner, had been in the race through the spring and summer, but withdrew in August after sustaining a leg injury which affected his ability to campaign.

== 1993 leadership challenge ==
Held on September 11, 1993.

- **Gordon Campbell** 4141
- Gordon Gibson 1600
- Gordon Wilson 531
- Linda Reid 166
- Wilf Hurd 62
- Allan Warnke 36
- Charles McKinney 4

== 2011 leadership election ==
Held on February 26, 2011

The rounds were counted in terms of points, with 100 points allocated per electoral district.

Candidate	First round		Second round		Third round	
Candidate	Points	%	Points	%	Points	%
**Christy Clark**	**3,209**	**37.75**	**3,575**	**42.06**	**4,420**	**52.0**
Kevin Falcon	2,411	28.36	2,564	30.16	4,080	48.0
George Abbott	2,091	24.60	2,361	27.78	Eliminated	
Mike de Jong	789	9.28	Eliminated			
Total	8,500	100.00	8,500	100.00	8,500	100.0

== 2018 leadership election ==
Held February 3, 2018

= Eliminated from next round
= Winner

Candidate	Ballot 1	Ballot 2		Ballot 3		Ballot 4		Ballot 5	
Name	Points	Points	+/− (pp)	Points	+/− (pp)	Points	+/− (pp)	Points	+/− (pp)
**Andrew Wilkinson**	1,591; 18.29%	1,631; 18.74%	+40 +0.45	2,201; 25.29%	+570 +6.55	2,862; 32.89%	+661 +7.60	**4,621**; **53.11%**	+1,759 +20.22
Dianne Watts	**2,135**; **24.54%**	**2,169**; **24.93%**	+34 +0.39	**2,469**; **28.38%**	+300 +3.45	**3,006**; **34.55%**	+537 +6.17	4,079; 46.89%	+1,073 +12.34
Michael Lee	1,916; 22.03%	1,960; 22.53%	+54 +0.50	2,264; 26.03%	+304 +3.50	2,832; 32.56%	+568 +6.53	Eliminated	
Todd Stone	1,483; 17.05%	1,505; 17.30%	+22 +0.25	1,766; 20.29%	+261 +2.99	Eliminated			
Mike de Jong	1,415; 16.27%	1,436; 16.51%	+21 +0.24	Eliminated					
Sam Sullivan	158; 1.82%	Eliminated							

== 2022 leadership election ==
A leadership election was held on February 5, 2022 to elect a new party leader following the resignation of Andrew Wilkinson after the 2020 British Columbia general election.

= Eliminated from next round
= Winner

Candidate	Ballot 1		Ballot 2		Ballot 3		Ballot 4		Ballot 5	
Name	Points	Percent	Points	Percent	Points	Percent	Points	Percent	Points	Percent
**Kevin Falcon**	**4121**	**47%**	4143	47.6%	4202.36	48.3%	4318.14	49.63%	4541.35	52.19%
Ellis Ross	2325	26.7%	2355.9	27.1%	2493.1	28.66%	2714.50	31.2%	2928.33	33.65%
Michael Lee	899	10.3%	912.4	10.5%	938.43	10.8%	1039.37	11.94%	1230.31	14.14%
Val Litwin	504	5.8%	517.9	5.95%	536.17	6.16%	627.97	7.21%	Eliminated	
Gavin Dew	466	5.4%	481.4	5.5%	429.93	6.01%	Eliminated			
Renee Merrifield	278	3.2%	289	3.3%	Eliminated					
Stan Sipos	104.6	1.2%	Eliminated							
