= Jev Tothill =

Leader of the British Columbia Liberal Party
- In office 1979–1981
- Preceded by: Gordon Gibson
- Succeeded by: Shirley McLoughlin

Personal details
- Born: 1928 or 1929 (age 97–98)
- Party: Liberal Party of Canada, British Columbia Liberal Party
- Occupation: Teacher

Jevington Blair (Jev) Tothill (born 1928 or 1929) is a former Canadian politician, who was the leader of the British Columbia Liberal Party from 1979 to 1981.

== Biography ==
Prior to his political career, Tothill was a high school teacher in the Cowichan Valley region of Vancouver Island who was known for creating a local community television service, and was an unsuccessful candidate for the party in the electoral district of Cowichan-Malahat in the 1975 provincial election.

He won the leadership at the party's leadership convention on February 19, 1979. His predecessor, Gordon Gibson, had held the party's only seat in the Legislative Assembly of British Columbia at the time of his resignation, leaving the party without legislative representation. Tothill soon announced plans to run as the party's candidate in a pending by-election in North Vancouver-Seymour, although that by-election was cancelled by the issuance of writs for the 1979 election. In that election, the only one under Tothill's leadership, the Liberals ran just five candidates provincewide and were entirely shut out of the legislature.

Tothill resigned as leader in late 1980 and was succeeded by Shirley McLoughlin at the party's 1981 leadership convention.
