= Shirley McLoughlin =

Canadian politician (1930–2018)

Leader of the British Columbia Liberal Party
- In office 1981–1984
- Preceded by: Jev Tothill
- Succeeded by: Art Lee

Personal details
- Born: June 25, 1930
- Died: July 20, 2018 (aged 88) Comox, British Columbia, Canada
- Party: Liberal Party of Canada, British Columbia Liberal Party
- Occupation: teacher

Shirley Eleanor McLoughlin (June 25, 1930 – July 20, 2018) was a Canadian politician, who was the leader of the British Columbia Liberal Party from 1981 to 1983. She was the first woman ever to lead a political party in the province.

== Life and career ==
Shirley Eleanor McLoughlin was born on June 25, 1930. Prior to assuming the leadership, McLoughlin worked as a teacher, and served as the party's president. She ran as the Liberal Party of Canada's candidate in Comox—Powell River in the 1980 federal election, losing to Ray Skelly. She was elected leader of the BC Liberals at their leadership convention on May 25, 1981, over lawyer Tom Finkelstein and farmer Roland Bouwman.

McLoughlin took over the leadership at a time when the party was in unprecedented crisis; under her predecessor Jev Tothill, the party had run just five candidates provincewide in the 1979 election, and had failed to win a single seat in the Legislative Assembly of British Columbia for the first time in its history. She led the party to a modest resurgence, running 52 candidates in the 1983 provincial election and increasing the party's popular vote total by over 600 per cent compared to 1979, but again failed to win a seat. She was defeated in her own dual-member district of Vancouver Centre by New Democrats Emery Barnes and Gary Lauk.

McLoughlin announced her resignation as party leader in August 1983. She was succeeded by Art Lee at the party's 1984 leadership convention.

McLoughlin later served two terms on the municipal council of Comox.

McLoughlin died at her home in Comox on July 20, 2018, at the age of 88.

== Electoral record ==
1980 Canadian federal election: Comox—Powell River
Party	Candidate	Votes	%	±%
New Democratic	Ray Skelly	25,007	48.97	+4.69
Progressive Conservative	Al Lazerte	16,545	32.40	–2.81
Liberal	Shirley McLoughlin	9,221	18.06	–1.82
Communist	Sy Pederson	292	0.57	–0.06
Total valid votes		51,065	99.79	
Total rejected ballots		110	0.21	+0.06
Turnout		51,175	68.92	–2.18
Eligible voters		74,254		
New Democratic hold		Swing		+3.75
Source: Elections Canada

1983 British Columbia general election: Vancouver Centre
Party	Candidate	Votes	%	Elected
New Democratic	Emery Oakland Barnes	18,960	28.70	✓
New Democratic	Gary Vernon Lauk	18,743	28.37	✓
Social Credit	Avril Kim Campbell	12,740	19.28	
Social Credit	Philip W. Owen	12,415	18.79	
Liberal	Shirley McLoughlin	2,084	3.15	
Progressive Conservative	Kevin Baden Bruce	880	1.33	
Communist	Maurice Rush	244	0.37	
Total valid votes		66,066	99.87	
Total rejected ballots		84	0.13	
Total votes		66,150		
Registered voters		53,512		
