= Norman Levi =

Canadian politician (1927-2015)

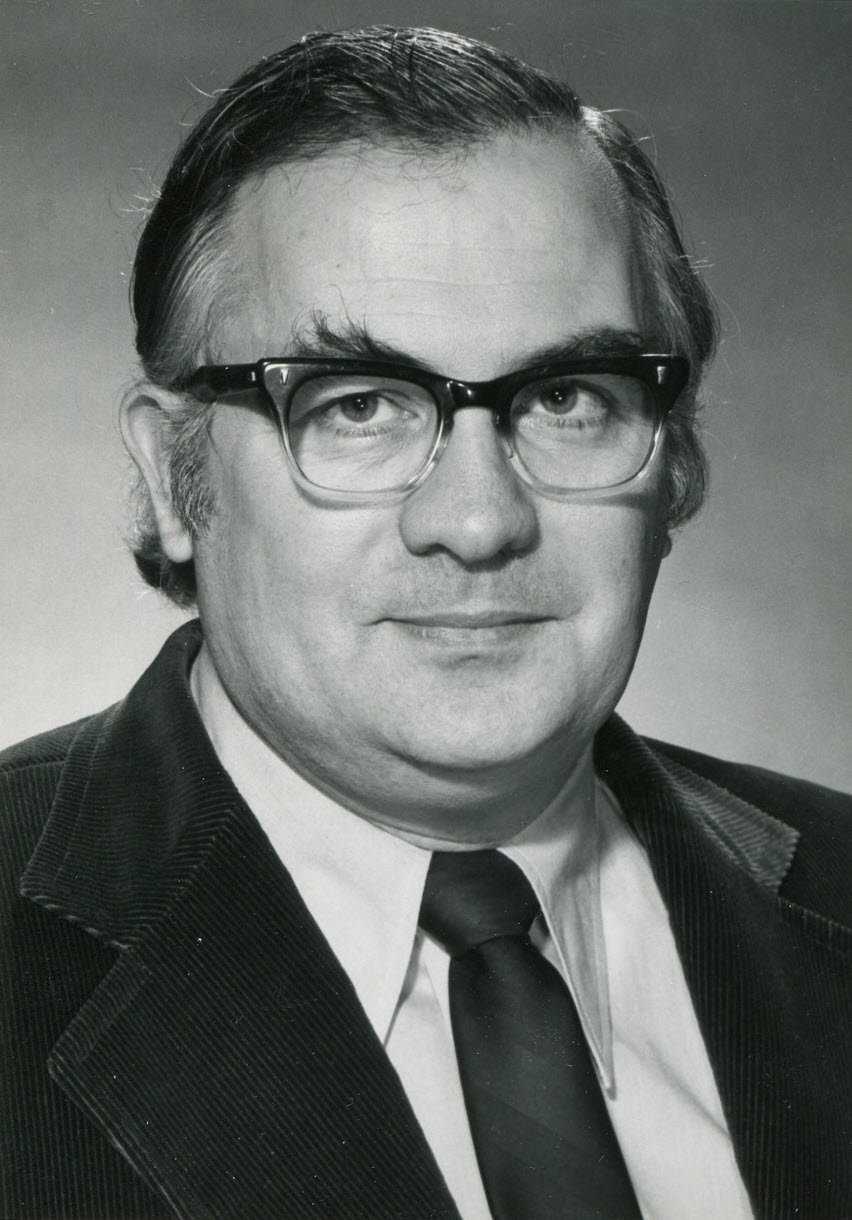

Member of the British Columbia Legislative Assembly for Coquitlam-Maillardville Vancouver-Burrard (1972–1979)
- In office 30 August 1972 – 5 May 1983 Serving with Rosemary Brown (1972–1979)
- Preceded by: Harold James Merilees; Bert Price
- Succeeded by: John Michael Parks

Member of the British Columbia Legislative Assembly for Vancouver South
- In office 21 May 1968 – 27 August 1969 Serving with Ralph Raymond Loffmark
- Preceded by: Thomas Audley Bate
- Succeeded by: Agnes Kripps

Personal details
- Born: 25 February 1927 Birmingham, Warwickshire, England
- Died: 25 December 2015 (aged 88) Victoria, British Columbia, Canada
- Party: British Columbia New Democratic Party
- Occupation: Social worker

Norman Levi (25 February 1927 – 25 December 2015) was an English-born social worker and political figure in British Columbia. He represented Vancouver South from 1968 to 1969, Vancouver-Burrard from 1972 to 1979 and Coquitlam-Maillardville from 1979 to 1983 in the Legislative Assembly of British Columbia as a New Democratic Party (NDP) member.

He was born in Birmingham and served in the British Army from 1943 to 1947. After leaving the army he moved to Canada, then studied at Western Washington University. In 1951, he married Gloria Hammerman. Levi graduated as a social worker and was hired by the John Howard Society in Vancouver. He served as president of the provincial NDP. After being defeated in the Vancouver South riding in the 1965 federal election, he was first elected to the provincial assembly in a 1968 by-election in the provincial riding of Vancouver South following the death of Thomas Audley Bate. He was defeated when he ran for re-election in 1969 and 1983. Levi served in the provincial cabinet as Minister of Rehabilitation and Social Improvement and as Minister of Human Resources. He died on 25 December 2015.
