= Gordon Gibson Jr =

Canadian politician (1937–2023)

Gordon Gibson OBC

Leader of the British Columbia Liberal Party
- In office September 28, 1975 – February 19, 1979
- Preceded by: David Anderson
- Succeeded by: Jev Tothill

Member of the Legislative Assembly of British Columbia for North Vancouver-Capilano
- In office 1974–1979
- Preceded by: David Maurice Brousson
- Succeeded by: Angus Creelman Ree

Personal details
- Born: Gordon Fulerton Gibson; August 23, 1937
- Died: November 10, 2023 (aged 86)
- Party: BC Liberal Party
- Other political affiliations: Liberal Party of Canada
- Parent: Gordon Gibson Sr. (father)

Gordon Fulerton Gibson OBC (August 23, 1937 – November 10, 2023), often referred to as Gordon Gibson Jr., was a Canadian author, political columnist, and politician in British Columbia. He was a Liberal member of the Legislative Assembly of British Columbia from 1974 to 1979, and served as the leader of the BC Liberal Party between 1975 and 1979.

== Early life ==
He was the son of Gordon Gibson Sr., who was a prominent businessman and Liberal Party politician in British Columbia in the 1950s and 1960s.

== Education ==
Gibson received a BA (honours) in mathematics and physics at the University of British Columbia and an MBA from Harvard Business School, and he did research work at the London School of Economics.

== Political career ==
=== Aide to Arthur Laing and Pierre Trudeau ===
Gibson worked for Arthur Laing, the federal Minister of Northern Affairs and National Resources and the senior cabinet minister from British Columbia in the Pearson Ministry, from 1963 to 1968. He became executive assistant to Justice Minister and leadership contender Pierre Trudeau in 1968 on the suggestion of Marc Lalonde, then an advisor in Pearson's Prime Minister's Office (PMO) and later Principal Secretary to Pierre Trudeau, and joined PMO upon Trudeau's appointment as Prime Minister. He was known to be one of few who could get Trudeau to consider western Canada perspectives on issue.

=== Unsuccessful bids for the House of Commons ===
Gibson contested his first election in the 1972 federal election, running as the Liberal candidate in Vancouver South to succeed his former boss Laing, but lost to Progressive Conservative candidate John Fraser by 3,000 votes.

After a stint as a provincial legislator and party leader, Gibson ran again for a seat in the federal House of Commons, in the riding of North Vancouver—Burnaby. He was defeated in both the 1979 and 1980 federal elections by Progressive Conservative candidate Chuck Cook by less than 1,500 votes on each attempt.

=== BC Liberal MLA and Leadership ===
In 1974, Gibson ran in a provincial by-election as a BC Liberal in the riding of North Vancouver-Capilano upon the resignation of incumbent Liberal MLA David Maurice Brousson. During BC Liberals' long period of wilderness between the collapsed of the Liberal-PC Coalition in 1952 and its 2001 return to government, North Vancouver was one of the very rare spot where it had residual electoral strength. Gibson's father and party leader Ray Perrault held the duo seat between 1960 and 1966. Brousson won three elections with comfortable margin. However with the continual declined of both the BC Liberals and Progressive Conservatives as centrist options, Gibson won the seat with a margin of only 57 votes out of 15,222 valid ballots, a margin smaller than the number of rejected ballots.

Three months before 1975 election, three Liberal MLAs, including former leader Pat McGeer and future lieutenant governor Garde Gardom, defected to the Social Credit Party, leaving Gibson and party leader David Anderson as the only two Liberals in the legislature. Anderson declined to be renominated to the leadership, and Gibson was approached to lead the party into the election. Just over a month before the election call on September 28, Gibson was acclaimed as leader, again following the footstep of his former boss Authur Laing. Given the party's disarray, voters abandoned the party en masse. For the first time in the province's history Liberals received less than 10% of the popular vote. That election saw former leader Anderson going down in defeat, and Surrey mayor Bill Vander Zalm, who Anderson defeated in the 1972 leadership contest, securing his first victory at the provincial level and immediately elevated to cabinet, commencing his long march toward the Premier's chair. As the only Liberal in the legislature, Gibson remained party leader until 1979, when he resigned to seek a federal seat again.

=== Bid to reclaim leadership ===
Gibson attempted to return to politics as a candidate in a contest colloquially referred to as the "Battle of the Three Gordons", the 1993 B.C. Liberal leadership challenge to incumbent leader Gordon Wilson after an extramarital affair between him and caucus member Judi Tyabji came to light. Gibson's campaign was dealt a fatal blow just over a month before the vote, when Vancouver Mayor Gordon Campbell's supporters mobilized and successfully secured approval, by a single vote out of close to 700 cast, for a proposal to change the leadership election process from one where all electoral districts would have equal weight, to one where all member votes are counted with equal weight. Campbell was already seen as the front runner prior to that change, but a Gibson win remained a possibility given the broad respect he commanded among long-time members across the province. The amendment made Campbell's lead prohibitive given the large number of members recruited in Vancouver the political machine he headed as mayor, as evident by the swollen membership roll of 15,000. Campbell easily defeated Gibson on the first ballot by a margin of 63% to 24%, with incumbent leader Wilson securing only 8%. Campbell was the only BC Liberals leader elected where all votes are count equal. The party soon reverted back to a system where with equal weights for all electoral districts.

== Post-political career ==
Gibson largely stayed out of partisan politics after the 1993 leadership bid, even when his immediate family members played prominent roles in the federal Liberal Party or the Vancouver municipal party Non-Partisan Association. He called himself non-partisan in a 2018 column, and have remained active and visible through public policy commentary throughout his retirement years.

Gibson was a senior fellow in Canadian Studies at the Fraser Institute and has written several books on Canadian federalism and governance. Following the 2001 British Columbia provincial election, he was hired by the government to make recommendations on the structure and mandate of the Citizens' Assembly on Electoral Reform. His report was substantially adopted. He also wrote extensively and critically about the Indian Act and first nation reserve system it created, calling it "both a fortress and a prison" and was critical about the policies guiding ongoing modern treaties negotiations.

His columns appeared frequently in the Vancouver Sun, the Winnipeg Free Press and The Globe and Mail.

== Personal ==
Gibson was first married to Valerie Gauthier, with whom he had three children before their divorce.

His second marriage was with Kilby Tobin, with whom he had two daughters. Tobin died in 2009.

He was married to Jane Baynham at this death. Gibson died on November 10, 2023, at the age of 86. Suffering from heart failure from early 2023, he opted for medical assistance in dying.

== Honours ==
In May 2008, Gibson was awarded the Order of British Columbia.

== Electoral history ==
1972 Canadian federal election: Vancouver South
Party	Candidate	Votes	%	±%
Progressive Conservative	John Allen Fraser	17,762	40.03	+16.29
Liberal	Gordon Gibson	14,549	32.79	-16.47
New Democratic	Roger Howard	11,145	25.12	+2.47
Social Credit	Tony Jefferson	765	1.72	-2.23
Independent	Sean Griffin	102	0.23	–
Independent	Rick Hundal	44	0.10	–
Total valid votes		44,367	100.0	
Progressive Conservative gain from Liberal		Swing		+16.38

British Columbia provincial by-election, 1974: North Vancouver-Capilano
Party	Candidate	Votes	%
Liberal	Gordon Fulerton Gibson	4,736	31.11
Social Credit	Ronald Clayton Andrews	4,679	30.74
Progressive Conservative	Peter Stewart Hyndman	3,151	20.70
New Democratic	Diane Mackenzie Baigent	2,637	17.32
Christian Democratic	Norman Gareth Dent	19	0.13

1975 British Columbia general election: North Vancouver-Capilano
Party	Candidate	Votes	%
Liberal	Gordon Fulerton Gibson	8,836	44.74
Social Credit	Ronald Clayton Andrews	8,530	43.19
New Democratic	Michael Ian Copes	2,393	12.07

1979 Canadian federal election: North Vancouver—Burnaby
Party	Candidate	Votes	%
Progressive Conservative	Chuck Cook	16,545	38.18
Liberal	Gordon F. Gibson	14,377	33.18
New Democratic	Russ Hicks	12,084	27.89
Social Credit	Poldi Meindl	188	0.43
Communist	Eric H. Waugh	92	0.21
Independent	A. Neila Taylor	29	0.07
Marxist–Leninist	Kitti Hundal	20	0.05
Total valid votes		43,335	100.0
This riding was created from parts of Burnaby—Seymour and Capilano, which elected a Liberal and a Progressive Conservative, respectively, in the previous election.

1980 Canadian federal election: North Vancouver—Burnaby
Party	Candidate	Votes	%	±%
Progressive Conservative	Chuck Cook	16,774	38.10	-0.08
Liberal	Gordon F. Gibson	15,307	34.77	+1.59
New Democratic	Jack Woodward	11,820	26.85	-1.04
Social Credit	Poldi Meindl	88	0.20	-0.23
Marxist–Leninist	Kitti Hundal	38	0.09	+0.04
Total valid votes		44,027	100.0	
Progressive Conservative hold		Swing		-0.84

== Writings ==
- A New Look at Canadian Indian Policy: Respect the Collective - Promote the Individual (2009). ISBN 978-0-88975-243-6
