= Paddy Neale =

Canadian politician

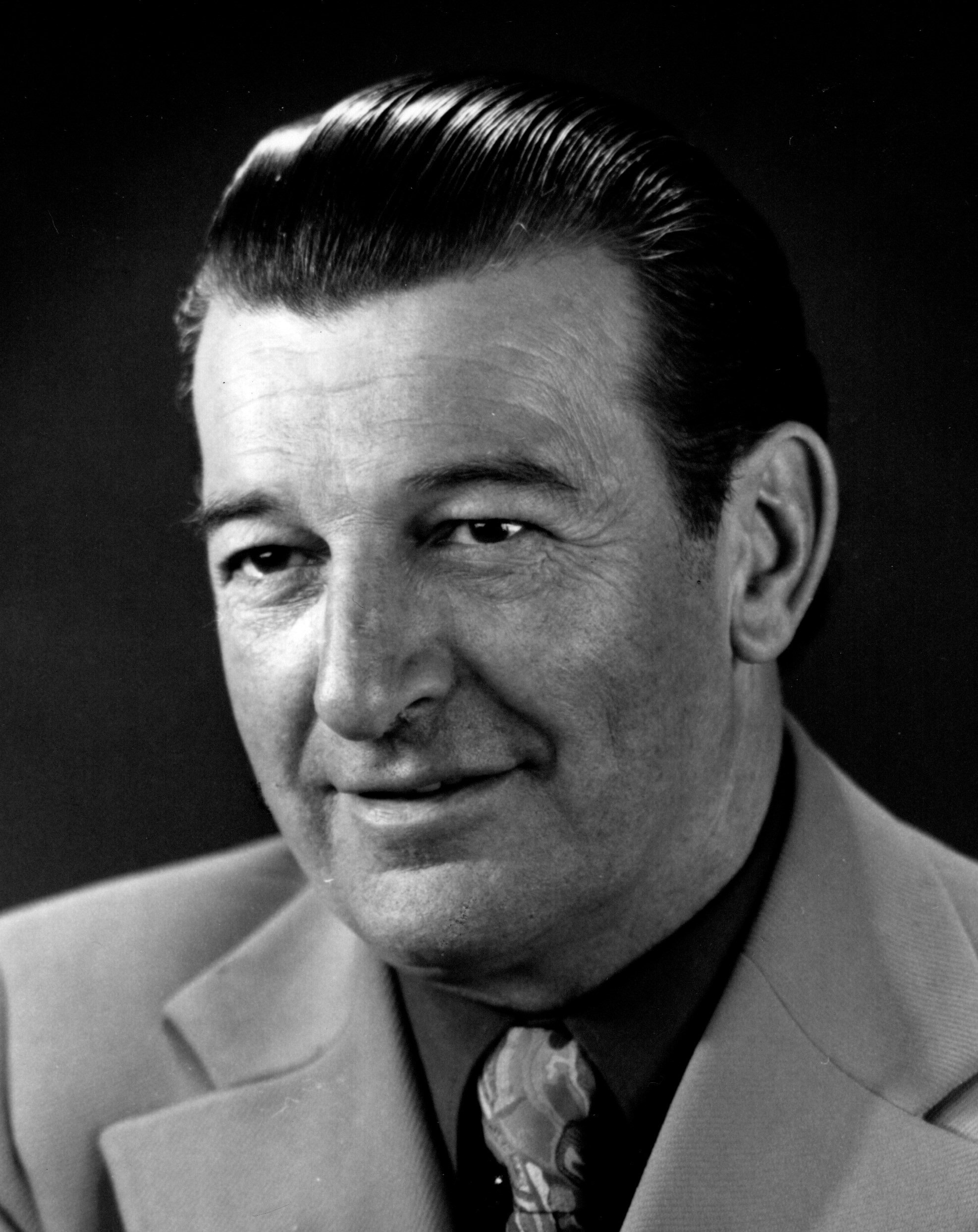

Member of the Canadian Parliament for Vancouver East
- In office January 4, 1973 – May 9, 1974
- Preceded by: Harold Winch
- Succeeded by: Art Lee

Personal details
- Born: Charles Patrick Neale; January 21, 1921 Hamilton, Ontario, Canada
- Died: February 9, 1990 (aged 69) Vancouver, British Columbia, Canada
- Party: New Democratic Party
- Occupation: labour unionist

Charles Patrick Neale (January 21, 1921 – February 9, 1990) was a Canadian politician, who represented the electoral district of Vancouver East in the House of Commons of Canada from 1972 to 1974. He was a member of the New Democratic Party.

Neale died at Vancouver on February 9, 1990, of complications of heart disease and chronic obstructive pulmonary disease.
