= David Maurice Brousson =

Canadian politician (1920–1992)

David Maurice Brousson (December 14, 1920 – May 3, 1992) was a businessman, educator and political figure in British Columbia. He represented North Vancouver-Capilano in the Legislative Assembly of British Columbia from a 1968 byelection until his resignation in 1973 as a Liberal.

== Biography ==
He was educated in Victoria, British Columbia and studied at Victoria College and the University of British Columbia. During World War II, Brousson was a lieutenant in an artillery unit. After the war, he founded Century Sales and Controls Ltd. In 1975, Brousson became dean at the British Columbia Institute of Technology. He served as chairman for the Lions Gate Hospital Foundation, as a member of the senate for the University of British Columbia (1966–1978) and as a member of the Board of Governors for the University of Victoria. Brousson was an unsuccessful candidate in the federal riding of Capilano in 1984. He resigned his seat in the provincial assembly in October 1973 to look after his business interests.
