= Agnes Kripps =

Canadian politician (1925–2014)

MLA for Vancouver South
- In office 1969–1972

Personal details
- Born: Oksana Semeniuk; November 28, 1925 Winnipeg, Manitoba
- Died: January 5, 2014 (aged 88) Vancouver, British Columbia
- Party: British Columbia Social Credit Party
- Spouse: Stephen Kripps (m. 1946)
- Occupation: businesswoman

Agnes Kripps (née Semeniuk; November 28, 1925 – January 5, 2014) was a Canadian politician. She served in the Legislative Assembly of British Columbia from 1969 to 1972 for the electoral district of Vancouver South, a member of the Social Credit Party. She was of Ukrainian descent.
