= Daisy Webster =

Canadian politician

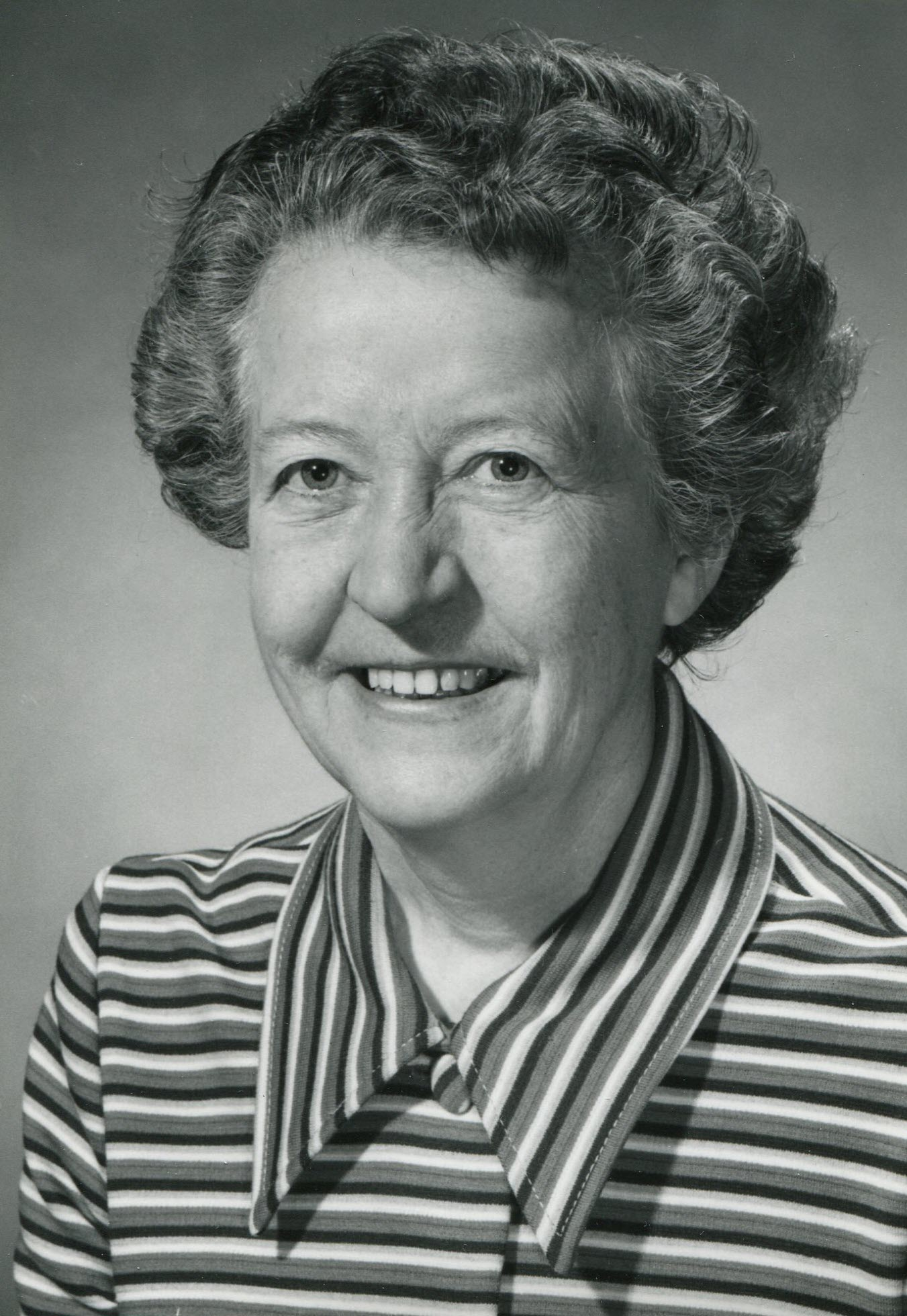

MLA for Vancouver South
- In office 1972–1975

Personal details
- Born: Daisy De Jong; July 13, 1911 Manitoba, Canada
- Died: August 11, 2004 (aged 93) Vancouver, British Columbia
- Party: British Columbia New Democratic Party

Daisy Webster (July 13, 1911 – August 11, 2004) was an educator, author and political figure in British Columbia. Along with Jack Radford, she represented Vancouver South in the Legislative Assembly of British Columbia from 1972 to 1975 as a New Democratic Party (NDP) member.

She was born Daisy de Jong in Manitoba and studied home economics. She worked as a waitress, as a store clerk and for a seed company before coming to Nanaimo, British Columbia in 1937, where she taught school. She also taught school in Duncan, Saanich, Prince George and Vancouver. She served two years as a nutritionist for the Canadian Army during World War II. In 1955, she married Arnold Webster. When her husband was elected to the Canadian House of Commons, she moved to Ottawa. In 1968, she received an M.A. from the University of British Columbia in adult education.

In 1970, Webster published the book Growth of the NDP in B.C. 1900-1970 - 81 Political Biographies. She died August 11, 2004.
