= 1986 British Columbia general election =

Canadian provincial election

- October 22, 1986

69 seats of the Legislative Assembly of British Columbia 35 seats were needed for a majority
- Turnout: 65.8% ▼4.7 pp 1,366,193 voted. (Note: The number of votes recorded exceeds the number of voters who voted due to the block voting system in use in BC's multi-member constituencies.)
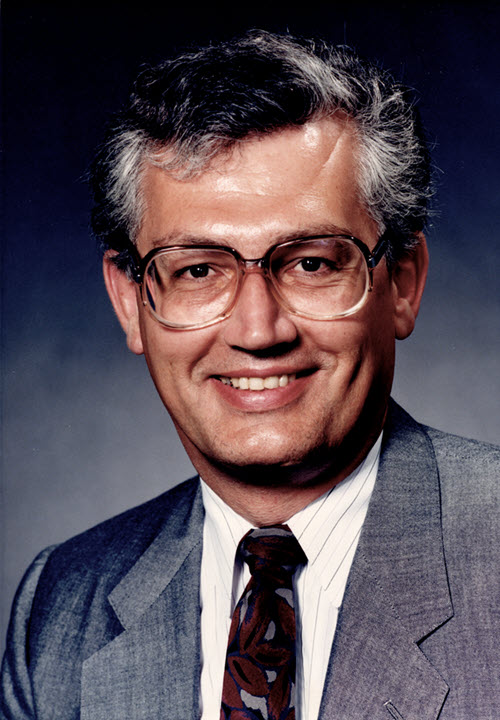

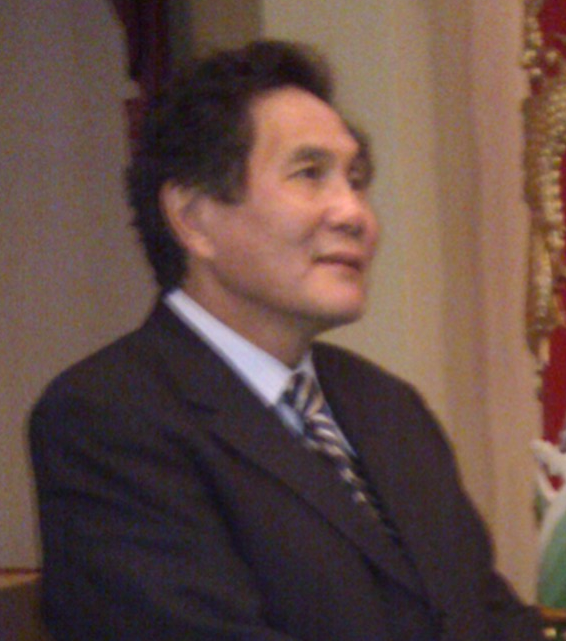
	First party	Second party	Third party
Leader	Bill Vander Zalm	Bob Skelly	Art Lee
Party	Social Credit	New Democratic	Liberal
Leader since	July 30, 1986	May 20, 1984	March 31, 1984
Leader's seat	Richmond	Alberni	Ran in Vancouver-Little Mountain (lost)
Last election	35	22	0
Seats won	47	22	0
Seat change	▲12	Steady	Steady
Popular vote	954,516	824,544	130,505
Percentage	49.32	42.60	6.74
Swing	▼0.44	▼2.34	▲4.05
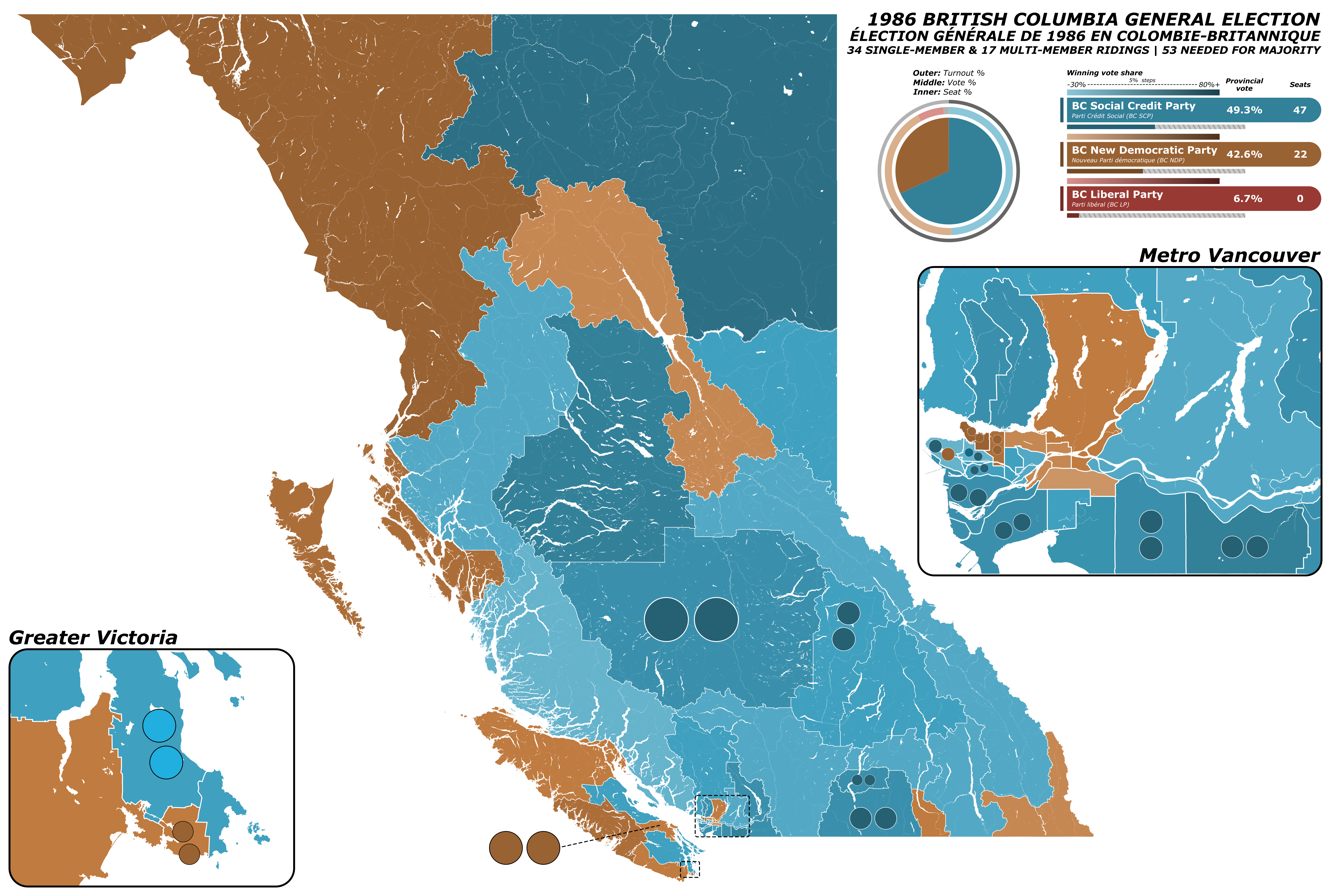
- Popular vote by riding. As this is an FPTP election, seat totals are not determined by popular vote, but instead via results by each riding. Click the map for more details.
Premier before election
Bill Vander Zalm
Social Credit
Premier after election
Bill Vander Zalm
Social Credit

The 1986 British Columbia general election was the 34th general election in the Province of British Columbia, Canada. It was held to elect members of the Legislative Assembly of British Columbia. The sitting Social Credit government was re-elected.

The election was called on September 24, 1986. The election was held on October 22, 1986, and the new legislature met for the first time on March 9, 1987.

The governing British Columbia Social Credit Party (Socreds) had seen a leadership change just months before the election, with Bill Bennett standing down in favour of Bill Vander Zalm. Promising a fresh start after the Bennett years, Vander Zalm led the Socreds to a fourth consecutive majority government, although with winning less than half of the popular vote. 12 new seats had been created in the legislature for this election. Social Credit coincidentally won 12 additional seats, while the social democratic New Democratic Party, led by Bob Skelly, won the same number it had in the previous election. No other parties won seats. In fact the two leading parties together - SC and NDP - took more than 90 per cent of the votes.

In addition to 35 single member districts, there were 17 two-member constituencies in this election. Voters in these places were allowed two votes (Block Voting), and generally used them both on the same party, with the largest group (even if not a majority) taking both seats.

Only one district elected both a SC and a NDP MLA. This was Vancouver-Point Grey where two women, an NDP member and a Socred (Kim Campbell, later a Canadian prime minister), were elected.

All other districts elected either two Socreds (12 districts) or two NDP members (four districts), with no representation given to the minority vote in the district. That helped ensure the government's capture of the most seats. (Note: Block voting also perhaps makes the popular vote – the number of votes cast – not truly reflective of the sentiment of the voters since some voters cast two votes, and others cast only one.)

It was the last election to be held with multi-member districts since BC moved to all single-member districts prior to the next election.

== Opinion polls ==
Evolution of voting intentions at provincial level
Polling firm	Last day of survey	Source	BCSC	BCNDP	BCLP	PCBC	Other	ME	Sample
Election 1986	October 22, 1986		49.32	42.60	6.74	0.73	0.61		
United Communications Research	October 1986		48	30	6	4	—N/a	3.64	725
United Communications Research	September 1986		50	29	6	3	—N/a	—N/a	—N/a
Election 1983	May 5, 1983		49.76	44.94	2.69	1.16	1.45		

== Results ==
Summary of the Legislative Assembly of British Columbia election results
Party	Party leader	Candidates	Seats				Valid votes received		
Party	Party leader	Candidates	1983	Dissol.	1986	Change	#	%	% Change
Social Credit	Bill Vander Zalm	69	35	-	47	▲ +12	954,516	49.32%	-0.44%
New Democratic	Bob Skelly	69	22	-	22	Steady	824,544	42.60%	-2.34%
Liberal	Art Lee	55	-	-	-	-	130,505	6.74%	+4.05%
Progressive Conservative	Vacant (Note: Party leader Peter Pollen quit shortly before the election was called.)	12	-	-	-	-	14,074	0.73%	-0.43%
Green		9	-	-	-	-	4,660	0.24%	0.05%
Independent		6	-	-	-	-	2,470	0.13%	-0.19%
Libertas		1	-	-	-	-	1,552	0.08%	-
People's Front		8	-	-	-	-	1,502	0.08%	-
Communist		3	-	-	-	-	722	0.03%	-0.02%
Libertarian		3	-	-	-	-	341	0.02%	-
Western Canada Concept	Doug Christie	1	-	-	-	-	322	0.02%	-0.84%
New Republic		1	-	-	-	-	245	0.01%	-
Total		237	57	57	69	▲ +12	1,935,453	100	-
Total voters voting							1,366,193		-

Popular vote
Social Credit	49.32%
NDP	42.60%
Liberal	6.74%
Others	1.34%

Seats summary
Social Credit	68.12%
NDP	31.88%

== See also ==
- List of British Columbia political parties
