= William Gerald Strongman =

Canadian politician

MLA for Vancouver South
- In office 1975–1979

Personal details
- Born: November 14, 1936 Toronto, Ontario, Canada
- Died: May 9, 2021 (aged 84) Vancouver, British Columbia, Canada
- Party: Social Credit Party of British Columbia

William Gerald Strongman (November 14, 1936 – May 9, 2021) was a Canadian politician. He served in the Legislative Assembly of British Columbia from 1975 to 1979, as a Social Credit Party of British Columbia member for the constituency of Vancouver South.

Strongman died on May 9, 2021, in North Vancouver.
