= 1983 British Columbia general election =

Canadian provincial election

← 1979	May 5, 1983	1986 →

57 seats of the Legislative Assembly of British Columbia 29 seats were needed for a majority
- Turnout: 70.5%
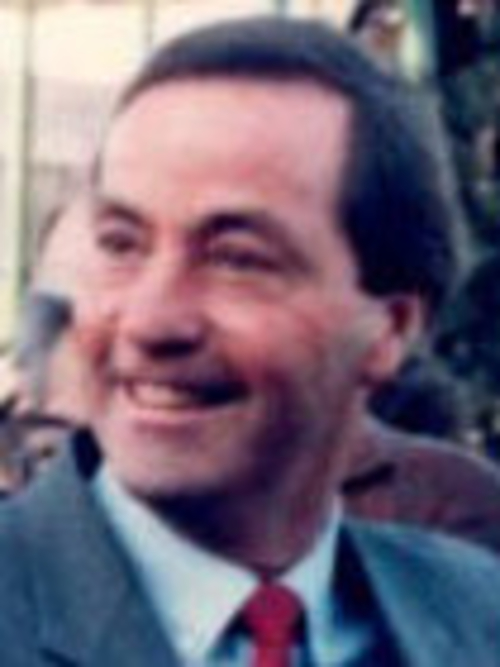

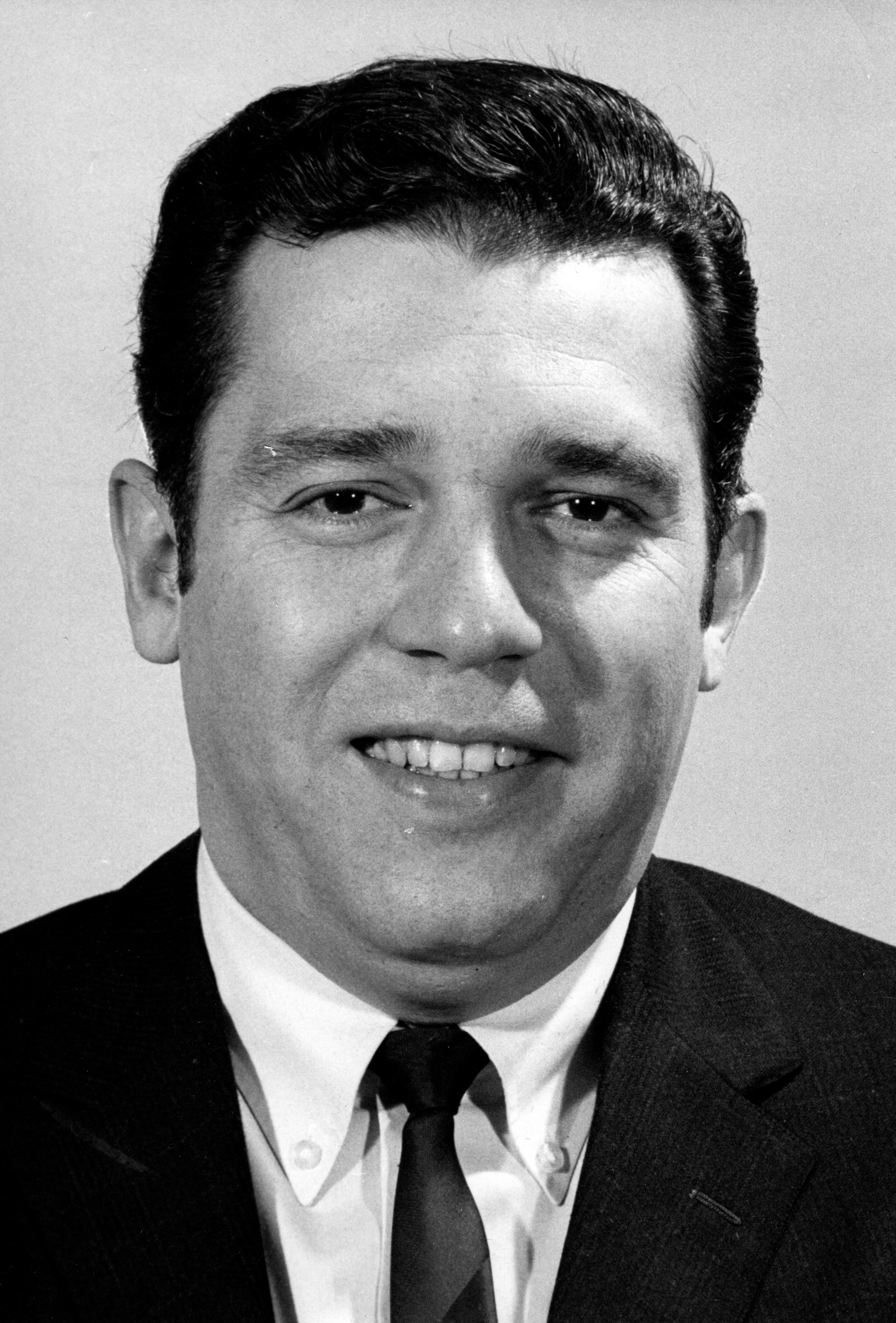
	First party	Second party
Leader	Bill Bennett	Dave Barrett
Party	Social Credit	New Democratic
Leader since	1973	1969
Leader's seat	Okanagan South	Vancouver East
Last election	31 seats, 48.23%	26 seats, 45.99%
Seats won	35	22
Seat change	▲4	▼4
Popular vote	820,807	741,354
Percentage	49.76%	44.94%
Swing	▲1.53	▼1.05
Premier before election
Bill Bennett
Social Credit
Premier after election
Bill Bennett
Social Credit

The 1983 British Columbia general election was the 33rd provincial election for the province of British Columbia, Canada. It was held to elect members of the Legislative Assembly of British Columbia. The election was called on April 7, 1983. The election was held on May 5, 1983. The new legislature that resulted from this election met for the first time on June 23, 1983.

The governing Social Credit Party of British Columbia was re-elected with a majority government, defeating the opposition New Democratic Party of British Columbia. The "Socreds" increased both their share of the popular vote to almost half of all votes cast, and their number of seats in the legislature. No other parties other than the Socreds and the NDP won seats in the legislature.

In addition to 43 single member districts, where single winner First-past-the-post voting was used, this election used seven two-member constituencies. Voters in those places were allowed two votes (plurality block voting) and generally used them both on the same party. None of those districts elected both a SC and a NDP MLA.

All districts elected either two SC members (4 districts) or two NDP members (three districts), with no representation given to the other voters in the district. In the case of Surrey, Social Credit candidates with only a minority of the vote, a combined 71,000 votes of the 150,000 cast, took both seats. That helped ensure the government's capture of the most seats. (The use of both first past the post and block voting also makes the "popular vote," the number of votes cast, not truly reflective of the sentiment of the voters, because some voters in those seven districts cast two votes and the voters in the other 43 districts cast only one.)

== Results ==
Party	Party leader	# of candidates	Seats			Popular vote		
Party	Party leader	# of candidates	1979	Elected	% Change	#	%	% Change
Social Credit	Bill Bennett	57	31	35	+12.9%	820,807	49.76%	+1.53%
New Democratic	Dave Barrett	57	26	22	-15.4%	741,354	44.94%	-1.05%
Liberal	Shirley McLoughlin	52	-	-	-	44,442	2.69%	+2.22%
Progressive Conservative	Brian Westwood	12	-	-	-	19,131	1.16%	-3.90%
Western Canada Concept	Doug Christie	18	*	-	*	14,185	0.86%	*
Independent		18	-	-	-	5,225	0.32%	+0.24%
Green	Adriane Carr	4	*	-	*	3,078	0.19%	*
Communist		4	-	-	-	837	0.05%	-0.03%
Western National		2	*	-	*	474	0.03%	*
Total		224	57	57	-	1,649,533	100%	

Note:

* Party did not nominate candidates in the previous election.

Popular vote
Social Credit	49.76%
NDP	44.94%
Others	5.30%

Seats summary
Social Credit	61.40%
NDP	38.60%

== See also ==
- List of British Columbia political parties
