= British Columbia Liberal Party =

Defunct provincial political party in Canada

- Defunct provincial party
- Abbreviation: BCL, BCU
- Founded: 1903; 123 years ago
- Dissolved: October 24, 2026 (deregistered)
- Headquarters: Vancouver, British Columbia
- Youth wing: BC Young Liberals
- Ideology: 1903–1987: Liberalism; 1987–1993: Centrism; 1993–2026: Conservatism; Neoliberalism
- Political position: 1903-1993: Centre; 1993–2026: Centre-right
- National affiliation: Liberal Party of Canada (until 1987)
- Colours: Deep red and blue; Aqua and pink (Note: As BC United)

The British Columbia Liberal Party, or BC Liberals, was a provincial political party in British Columbia, Canada. The party has been described as conservative, neoliberal, and occupying a centre-right position on the left–right political spectrum. (Note: The preponderance of reliable sources describe the party as: Conservative; Neoliberal; Centre-right) The party commonly described itself as a "free enterprise coalition" and drew support from members of both the federal Liberal and Conservative parties. From 1991 to 2024, the BC Liberals were the main centre-right opposition to the centre-left to left-wing New Democratic Party (NDP). Once affiliated with the Liberal Party of Canada, the British Columbia Liberal Party became independent in 1987. The party changed its name to BC United on April 12, 2023.

Until the 1940s, British Columbia politics were dominated by the Liberal Party and rival Conservative Party. The Liberals formed government from 1916 to 1928 and again from 1933 to 1941. From 1941 to 1952, the two parties governed in a coalition (led by a Liberal leader) to counter the ascendant Co-operative Commonwealth Federation. The coalition dissolved in January 1952 and the subsequent Liberal government was defeated in the 1952 election by the new Social Credit Party; the party went into decline, eventually losing its presence in the legislature in the 1979 election. It returned to the legislature in the 1991 election, coming in second and forming the Official Opposition, through the efforts of leader Gordon Wilson. Wilson lost a leadership challenge to Gordon Campbell in 1994. Under Campbell's leadership, the BC Liberals began to shift rightwards politically and distance themselves from the federal party. In the 2001 election, the Liberals won an overwhelming majority; they held their majority status under Campbell and his successor Christy Clark until shortly after the 2017 election.

The party remained in Opposition after losing the 2020 election and rebranded as BC United in 2023. After a notable decline in polls and floor-crossings to a resurgent Conservative Party, BC United opted to not contest the 2024 election and formally endorsed the Conservatives. BC United also did not register candidates for the 2026 election, and was subsequently deregistered under British Columbia's Election Act.

Eight party leaders served as premier of British Columbia: Harlan Brewster, John Oliver, John MacLean, Duff Pattullo, John Hart, Boss Johnson, Gordon Campbell, and Christy Clark. From the 2022 leadership election until its deregistration in 2026, the party was led by Kevin Falcon.

== History ==
=== Early partisan years: 1903–1916 ===
The Liberal Association of British Columbia, a formal provincial branch of the Liberal Party of Canada, held its first leadership convention in Vancouver in February 1902. That convention foreshadowed the decades of complex and delicate relations between the provincial party and the national party. Controversial Vancouver City MLA "Fighting Joe" Martin, briefly a non-partisan premier who also served as a Liberal MP and MLA in Manitoba, was elected leader on the first ballot against the wish of Clifford Sifton, Laurier's lieutenant for western Canada and an old foe of Martin (from their time as Manitoba MLAs and successive attorneys general, and from Martin's resentment for not having been invited to join Laurier's cabinet) after Sifton's ally Senator William Templeman, the provincial party chairman, lost control of the convention credentialing and was ousted by George Ritchie Maxwell, the MP for Burrard and a Martin ally. Far from a unifying figure, Martin would resign in June the following year before having led the party through an election. In anticipation of an imminent election call, the party brass opted not to call a leadership convention, leaving the leadership question for the post-election caucus to decide.

=== First government: 1916–1928 ===
The divided Conservatives faced the Liberals in the election of 1916 and lost. The Liberals formed a government under Harlan Carey Brewster. Brewster had become leader of the Opposition and was elected party leader in March 1912. He lost his seat a few weeks later in the 1912 election, which returned no Liberals at all. In 1916, he won election to the legislature again through a by-election and led his party to victory in a general election later that year by campaigning on a reform platform. Brewster promised to end patronage in the civil service, end political machines, improve workman's compensation and labour laws, bring in votes for women, and other progressive reforms.

The government brought in women's suffrage, instituted prohibition, and combated political corruption before his unexpected death in 1918. He is interred in the Ross Bay Cemetery in Victoria, British Columbia. John Oliver succeeded Brewster as premier when Brewster died in 1918. Oliver's government developed the produce industry in the Nanook Valley, and tried to persuade the federal government to lower the freight rate for rail transport. The party managed a bare majority win in the 1920 election and only managed to govern after the 1924 election with the support of the two Independent Liberals.

=== Opposition and the Great Depression: 1928–1933 ===
The Liberals managed to increase their vote in the 1928 election but lost close to half their seats. With the onset of the Great Depression and the implosion of the government of Simon Fraser Tolmie, the Liberals won the 1933 election.

=== Duff Pattullo: 1933–1941 ===
The 1933 election brought into power Duff Pattullo and introduced into the legislature the Co-operative Commonwealth Federation (CCF), a new social-democratic and democratic socialist opposition party. Pattullo wanted an activist government to try to deal with the depression through social programs and support of the unemployed. Canada has been recognized as the hardest hit by the Great Depression, and western Canada the hardest hit within Canada. Pattullo's attempts were often at odds with the federal government in Ottawa. Pattullo was also an advocate for British Columbia, and suggested the annexation of Yukon by BC, and the construction of the Alaska Highway to reduce the power of eastern Canada over BC. In the 1937 general election, his government was re-elected running on the slogan of "socialized capitalism".

=== "The Coalition": 1941–1951 ===
The alternating government with the Conservatives came to an end with the rise of the CCF, who managed to be the Official Opposition from 1933 to 1937 and were one seat less than the Conservatives in the 1937 election. In the 1941 election, the CCF came second. The election did not give the Liberals the majority they hoped for. John Hart became the premier and Liberal leader in 1941 when Pattullo refused to go into coalition with the Conservatives. The Liberal members removed Patullo as leader and Hart formed a Liberal–Conservative coalition government, known in BC history as "the Coalition". From 1941 to 1945, Hart governed at a time of wartime scarcity, when all major government projects were postponed. The coalition government was re-elected in the 1945 election. In that contest, Liberals and Conservatives ran under the same banner.

After 1945, Hart undertook an ambitious program of rural electrification, hydroelectric and highway construction. Hart's most significant projects were the construction of Highway 97 to northern British Columbia (of which the Prince George–Dawson Creek segment is now named in his honour) and the Bridge River Power Project, which was the first major hydroelectric development in British Columbia. He established the BC Power Commission, a forerunner of BC Hydro, to provide power to smaller communities that were not serviced by private utilities. In December 1947, Hart retired as premier. The Conservative Party agitated for its leader, Herbert Anscomb, to succeed Hart as premier. Still, the Liberals outnumbered the Tories in the coalition caucus. Hart was followed by another Liberal, Boss Johnson, with Anscomb as deputy premier and minister of finance.

Johnson's government introduced universal hospital insurance and a 3% provincial sales tax to pay for it. It expanded the highway system, extended the Pacific Great Eastern Railway, and negotiated the Alcan Agreement, which facilitated construction of the Kenny Dam. The government also coped with the 1948 flooding of the Fraser River, declaring a state of emergency and beginning a program of diking the river's banks through the Fraser Valley. Johnson is also noted for appointing Nancy Hodges as the first female Speaker in the Commonwealth. The Liberal-Conservative coalition government won the 1949 election – at 61% the greatest percentage of the popular vote in BC history. Tensions had grown between the coalition partners and within both parties. The Liberal Party executive voted to terminate the coalition and Johnson dropped his Conservative ministers in January 1952, resulting in a short-lived minority government which soon collapsed.

=== 1952 election ===
In order to prevent the CCF from winning in a three-party competition, the government introduced instant-runoff voting, with the expectation that Conservative voters would list the Liberals as their second choice and vice versa. Voters, however, were looking for alternatives. More voters chose British Columbia Social Credit League ahead of any other party as their second choice. Social Credit went on to emerge as the largest party when the ballots were counted in the 1952 general election. Social Credit's de facto leader during the election, W. A. C. Bennett, formerly a Conservative, was formally named party leader after the election.

At the 1953 general election, the Liberals were reduced to four seats, taking 23.36% of the vote. Arthur Laing defeated Tilly Rolston in Vancouver Point Grey. Although Social Credit won a majority of seats in the legislature, their finance minister Einar Gunderson was defeated in Oak Bay by Philip Archibald Gibbs of the Liberals. Gordon Gibson Sr, a millionaire timber baron, nicknamed the "Bull of the Woods", was elected for Lillooet as a Liberal.

=== Third party status: 1953–1979 ===
During the early period of this time, the Liberals' most prominent member was Gordon Gibson Sr. He was a cigar-smoking and gregarious logging contractor who could have been premier but for a major political error. He was elected in 1953 for the Lillooet riding. In 1955, the Sommers scandal surfaced, and he was the only leader in the legislature to make an issue of it. W. A. C. Bennett and his attorney general tried many tactics to stop the information from coming out. In frustration, Gibson resigned his seat and forced a by-election, hoping to make the Sommers scandal the issue. The voting system had changed, and he came a close second after Social Credit.

In the 1956 election, with the Sommers scandal still not resolved, the Liberals fared worse than in 1953. Arthur Laing lost his seat, and the party was reduced to two MLAs and 20.9% of the vote. In the 1960 election, the party won four seats with the same 20.9% of the popular vote as in 1956. In the 1963 election, the party's caucus increased by one more MLA to five, but their share of the popular vote fell to 19.98%. In the 1966 election, the party won another seat, bringing its caucus to six, and had an increase in the vote to 20.24%. In the 1969 vote, the party lost one seat, and its share of the vote fell to 19.03%.

In 1972, the party was led into the election by a new leader, David Anderson, who had been elected in the 1968 federal election as an MP for the Liberal Party of Canada. He and four others managed to be elected to the legislature, but with the lowest vote in party history at 16.4%. After the British Columbia New Democratic Party (BC NDP) won the 1972 election, many supporters of the Liberal and Conservative parties defected to the Social Credit League. This coalition was able to keep the New Democrats out of power from 1975 until the 1990s. MLAs Garde Gardom, Pat McGeer and Allan Williams left the Liberals for Social Credit along with Hugh Curtis of the suddenly rejuvenated Tories. All of them became members of Social Credit Cabinets after 1975. In the 1975 election, the only Liberal to be elected was Gordon Gibson Jr. as the party scored a dismal 7.24%. David Anderson was badly defeated in his Victoria riding, placing behind the New Democrats and Social Credit.

=== In the wilderness: 1979–1991 ===
The 1979 election was the party's lowest point. For the second time in party history, it was shut out of the legislature. Only five candidates ran, none were elected, and the party got 0.5% of the vote. The 1983 election saw a small recovery as the party came close to a full slate of candidates, but won 2.69% of the vote. The 1986 vote was the third and last election in which the party was shut out. Its share of the popular vote improved to 6.74%.

In 1987, Gordon Wilson became the leader of the provincial Liberal Party when no one else was interested. Wilson severed formal links between the provincial Liberal party and its federal counterpart. Since the mid-1970s, most federal Liberals in BC had chosen to support the British Columbia Social Credit Party at the provincial level. For the provincial party, the intent of this separation was to reduce the influence of Social Credit members of federal party. From the federal party's perspective, this move was equally beneficial to them, as the provincial party was heavily in debt.

Wilson set about to rebuild the provincial party as a credible third party in British Columbia politics. During the same period, the ruling Social Credit party was beset by controversy under the leadership of Bill Vander Zalm. As a result, multiple Social Credit scandals caused many voters to look for an alternative. By the time of the 1991 election, Wilson lobbied to be included in the televised Canadian Broadcasting Corporation (CBC) debate between Vander Zalm's successor, Premier Rita Johnston and BC NDP leader Michael Harcourt. The CBC agreed, and Wilson impressed many voters with his performance. The Liberal campaign gained momentum and siphoned off much support from the Social Credit campaign. While the BC NDP won the election, the Liberals came in second with 17 seats. Wilson became leader of the Opposition.

=== Official Opposition under Wilson: 1991–1993 ===
Wilson's policies did not coincide with many other Liberals both in the legislature and in the party who wanted to fill the vacuum left by the collapse of Social Credit. The Liberals also proved themselves to be inexperienced, both in the legislature and in building a broad-based political movement. They had a difficult time to build a disciplined organization that could mount an effective opposition against the New Democratic Party provincial government.

In 1993, Wilson's leadership was further damaged by revelations of his affair with fellow Liberal MLA Judi Tyabji. By this time, most of the caucus was in open revolt against his leadership. Wilson agreed to call for a leadership convention, at which he would be a candidate. Delta South MLA Fred Gingell became the leader of the Opposition while the Liberal leadership race took place.

Soon, former party leader Gordon Gibson and Vancouver mayor Gordon Campbell entered the leadership race. Campbell won decisively on the first ballot, with former party leader Gordon Gibson placing second and Wilson third. The leadership election was decided on a one-member, one-vote system through which Liberals voted for their choices by telephone. Wilson and Tyabji then left the Liberals and formed their own party, the Progressive Democratic Alliance.

=== Official Opposition under Campbell: 1993–2001 ===
Once Campbell became leader, the Liberals adopted the moniker "BC Liberals" for the first time, and soon introduced a new logo and new party colours (red and blue, instead of the usual "Liberal red" and accompanying maple leaf). The revised name and logo was an attempt to distinguish itself more clearly in the minds of voters from the federal Liberal Party of Canada.

In early 1994, Campbell was elected to the legislature in a by-election. Under his leadership, the party began moving to the right, gaining support from members of the former Social Credit Party and, later, the provincial Reform Party. Some moderate Socreds had begun voting Liberal as far back as the Vander Zalm era. The Liberals won two former Socred seats in by-elections held in the Fraser Valley region, solidifying their claim to be the clear alternative to the existing BC NDP government. The Liberal party also filled the vacuum created on the centre-right of the BC political spectrum by Social Credit's collapse.

In the 1996 election, the BC Liberals won the popular vote. However, much of the Liberal margin was wasted on large margins in the outer regions of the province; they only won eight seats in Vancouver and the Lower Mainland. In rural British Columbia, particularly in the Interior where the railway was the lifeblood of the local economy – the BC Liberals lost several contests because of discomfort that the electorate had with some of Campbell's policies, principally his promise to sell BC Rail. The net result was to consign the Liberals to opposition again, though they managed to slash the NDP's majority from 13 to three.

After the election, the BC Liberals set about making sure that there would be no repeat of 1996. Campbell jettisoned some of the less popular policy planks in his 1996 platform, most notably a promise to sell BC Rail, as the prospect of the sale's consequences had alienated supporters in the Northern Interior ridings.

=== Campbell government: 2001–2011 ===
Party logo during the 2001 and 2005 elections

After a scandal-filled second term for the BC NDP government, the BC Liberals won the 2001 election with the biggest landslide in BC history, taking 77 of 79 seats. They even managed to unseat Premier Ujjal Dosanjh in his own riding. Gordon Campbell became the seventh premier in ten years, and the first Liberal premier in almost 50 years. Campbell introduced a 25% cut in all provincial income taxes on the first day he was installed to office. The BC Liberals also reduced the corporate income tax and abolished the corporate capital tax for most businesses (a tax on investment and employment that had been introduced by the New Democrats).

Campbell's first term was also noted for fiscal austerity, including reductions in welfare rolls and some social services, deregulation, the sale of some government assets (in particular the "Fast ferries" built by the previous government, which were sold off for a fraction of their price). Campbell also initiated the privatization of BC Rail, which the Liberals had promised not to sell in order to win northern ridings which had rejected the party in 1996 but reversed this promise after election, with criminal investigations connected with the bidding process resulting in the 2003 British Columbia Legislature raids and the ensuing and still-pending court case. There were several significant labour disputes, some of which were settled through government legislation but which included confrontations with the province's doctors. Campbell also downsized the civil service, with staff cutbacks of more than 50 per cent in some government departments, and despite promises of smaller government the size of cabinet was nearly doubled and parliamentary salaries raised. Governance was also re-arranged such that Deputy Ministers were now to report to the Chief of Staff in the premier's office, rather than to their respective ministers. In the course of the cuts, hospitals, courthouses and extended care facilities around the province were shut down, particularly in smaller communities, and enforcement staff such as the BC Conservation Service were reduced to marginal levels. Various provincial parks created during the previous NDP regime were also downgraded to protected area status, meaning they could be opened for resource exploitation, and fees for use of parks were raised.

In 2003, a drug investigation known as Operation Everwhichway led to raids on government offices in the British Columbia Parliament Buildings in relation to suspect dealings concerning the sale of BC Rail to CN in a scandal which became known as "Railgate" and the trial of four former ministerial aides for influence peddling, breach of trust and accepting bribes.

Party logo during the 2009 campaign

The Liberals were re-elected in the 2005 election with a reduced majority of 7 seats (46–33). The Liberals were again re-elected in the 2009 election.

Shortly after this election the introduction of the HST was announced, contrary to promises made during the election campaign.

On November 3, 2010, facing an imminent caucus revolt over his management style and the political backlash against the Harmonized Sales Tax (HST) and the controversial end to the BC Rail corruption trial and with his approval rating as low as 9% in polls, Gordon Campbell announced his resignation.

=== Clark government: 2011–2017 ===
The party's 2011 leadership convention was prompted by Gordon Campbell's request to the party to hold a leadership convention "at the earliest possible date". The convention elected Christy Clark as its new leader of the party on February 26, 2011. Clark and her new Cabinet were sworn in on March 14.

Party logo during the Clark premiership

Under Clark, the party charted a more centrist outlook while continuing its recent tradition of being a coalition of federal Liberal and federal Conservative supporters. She immediately raised the minimum wage from $8/hour to $10.25/hour and introduced a province-wide Family Day similar to Ontario's. Clark became premier during the aftermath of the 2008–09 recession and continued to hold the line on government spending, introducing two deficit budgets before a balanced one for the 2013–14 fiscal year, which included a tax hike on high-income British Columbians. She also sought to take advantage of BC's liquified natural gas (LNG) reserves, positioning the budding LNG industry as a major economic development opportunity over the next decade. While the final years of Gordon Campbell's administration had seen far-reaching and progressive environmental legislation enacted, Clark was more measured in her approach to environmental policy. While continuing with BC's first-in-North-America carbon tax, she promised to freeze the rate during the 2013 election and her LNG development aspirations seemed to contradict greenhouse gas emissions targets set by the Campbell government in 2007. She also announced in 2012 that any future pipeline that crosses BC would have to meet five conditions that included environmental requirements and Indigenous consultation. Controversially, she indicated that one of her five conditions would be that BC receives its "fair share" of any revenues that accrue from increased pipeline and tanker traffic. This has put her in direct conflict with the province of Alberta, who sought increased market access for its bitumen through BC ports, yet adamantly refuse any arrangement which would see BC receive any royalties.

In 2011, Colin Hansen proposed the party change its name in order to avoid confusion with the unrelated Liberal Party of Canada and to better reflect its status as a coalition of many federal Conservative and Liberal voters. He did not propose an alternative name. Clark said she would consider a name change but was not in "any rush to do it". During the 2013 election, Clark entered the campaign low in public opinion polls and trailing her main rival, Adrian Dix of the NDP, by as much as 20 points. The BC Liberals campaign slogan was "Strong Economy, Secure Tomorrow" and highlighted a balanced budget and strong development opportunities in the LNG sector as a reason for voters to elect them for a fourth term in office. Clark brought in strategists affiliated with the Ontario Liberal Party, such as Don Guy and Laura Miller, and federal Liberal figures, such as Mike McDonald, to run her office and campaign. The BC Liberals came from behind to secure a fourth term in office; however, Clark was defeated in her Vancouver riding but won a subsequent by-election in the Okanagan riding of Westside-Kelowna. After the election, she sought a thawing of relations between BC and Alberta over future pipeline projects, signing onto former Alberta premier Alison Redford's National Energy Strategy. In early 2014, the Liberals brought down a second straight balanced budget and introduced legislation to change BC's liquor laws to allow liquor sales in some grocery stores and allow children to sit with adults in pubs and restaurants where liquor is served.

In the 2017 election, the BC Liberals' seat count was reduced to 43, one seat short of a majority. On May 29, 2017, after final vote counting had completed, the BC NDP and the BC Green Party agreed to a confidence and supply agreement to ensure a stable minority government. Their combined 44 seats give them an advantage over the BC Liberals' 43, which was sufficient to defeat Clark's government on a confidence vote on June 29, 2017, after which Clark resigned as premier (effective July 18, 2017) and the lieutenant governor asked NDP leader John Horgan to form a government. Rich Coleman became the party's interim leader following Clark's resignation.

=== Official Opposition under Wilkinson and Bond: 2018–2022 ===
Party logo 2018–2023, the final logo under the BC Liberals name

Andrew Wilkinson was elected party leader on February 3, 2018. He served as leader of the Opposition for two years. During the 2020 general election, Wilkinson was criticized by party members, including the membership chair, for his delay in removing Laurie Throness, a candidate and former MLA who had made anti-LGBTQ statements. After the party was defeated in the election, he resigned. Shirley Bond served as the party's interim leader until the 2022 leadership contest.

=== Falcon leadership, name change, campaign suspension, and deregistration: 2022–2026 ===
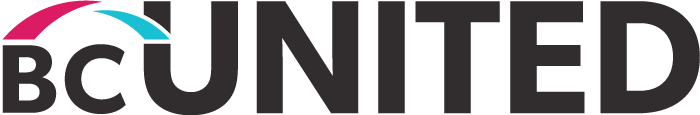
Party logo 2023—2026.

Kevin Falcon, deputy premier under Clark, was elected leader of the BC Liberals on February 5, 2022. During his leadership campaign, Falcon pledged to rename and rebrand the party, in order to fully disassociate it from the Liberal Party of Canada. At the 2022 party convention, delegates passed a resolution to move forward with the name-change process, beginning with consultations with the party membership before putting it to a vote by the end of the year. After a province-wide survey, "BC United" was put forward as the potential new name for the party. The name was then put to party members on November 13, and on November 16, it was announced that the name change had been approved by roughly 80 per cent. The name change was later ratified and took effect on April 12, 2023.

The name change preceded a significant drop in polling numbers for the party, with the BC Conservatives – led by former Liberal MLA John Rustad, who defected shortly before the name change was finalized – surpassing them as the second most popular party in the province according to polls. After polling at 33 per cent in the immediate aftermath of the name change, BC United suffered a further MLA defection as BC United MLA Bruce Banman crossed the floor to the Conservatives, as the party dropped to 19 per cent in the polls, 6 points behind the Conservatives by that September. In 2024, two more BC United MLAs, Lorne Doerkson and Elenore Sturko, defected to the BC Conservatives. In the second quarter of 2024, the BC Conservatives surpassed United in terms of money gained from donations. In the lead-up to the 2024 election, BC United suffered further defections from members and candidates. Some thought that the name change led to voters not knowing that BC United was a continuation of the BC Liberals; a Léger poll released in October 2023 found that a third of voters did not know about the name change. Another poll by Léger in August 2024 suggested that the party was primarily losing its traditional faction of voters who support the Conservative Party of Canada federally to the BC Conservatives.

On August 28, 2024, Falcon announced that BC United would suspend its political campaigning, with Falcon endorsing the BC Conservatives, saying "John Rustad and I haven't always agreed on everything, but one thing is clear: our province cannot take another four years of the NDP." Falcon said this was done to prevent vote splitting in competitive ridings. While 18 nominated BC United candidates, including five incumbent BC United MLAs, ran for re-election as independent or unaffiliated candidates in the 2024 British Columbia general election, none were successful. Falcon remained as leader following the election. In February 2025, former BC United MLA Karin Kirkpatrick called for him to resign, saying that his continued presence was preventing the party from rebuilding and raising funds to pay its debts. Falcon refused to resign, however, stating that a leadership contest would further drain the party's financial resources. Consequently, Kirkpatrick left the party and founded the CentreBC party with several other former BC United MLAs.

In June 2026, former supporters of BC United met in an effort to reclaim the party's Liberal brand name and plot a potential comeback following the election of Kerry-Lynne Findlay as BC Conservative Leader, with a presentation circulating among group members emphasizing the importance of the Liberal name and citing the success of the federal Liberals under Prime Minister Mark Carney. An online Research Co. poll conducted after the BC Conservatives’ leadership race found that 47% of British Columbians believe that BC needs a centre-right party, and 41% say that it's time to bring back the BC Liberals, with an additional voting intention question that included the BC Liberals as an option found the NDP leading with 35% of decided voters, followed by the BC Conservatives (34%) and Liberals (15%).

In September 2026, amid turmoil in the BC Conservatives under Findlay, a grassroots group called Unite Liberal BC sought to revive BC United and called for Falcon and three remaining party board members to step down. The group's stated goals were to give voters what they referred to as a "principled, mainstream centre-right alternative" and to restore democratic member governance to the party. Lead organizer for Unite Liberal BC and former member of BC United's executive council Carol Fielding stated that the party has served as the primary free-enterprise coalition capable of defeating the NDP and that BC United remained an active, debt-free registered political entity with valuable assets and a constitution that vests authority in its membership.

BC United did not field candidates in the 2026 British Columbia general election. It was the second election in succession that it failed to do so and the party was accordingly de-registered by Elections BC under section 168 of the Election Act. On October 27, 2026, Falcon announced that he was stepping down as party leader following the BC Conservative victory in the 2026 provincial election, saying he had remained leader in order to prevent the party from being used to split the centre-right vote.

== Party leaders ==
BC Liberal / BC United party leaders
#	Party leader	Tenure	Notes
1	Joseph Martin	February 6, 1902 – June 3, 1903	13th premier of British Columbia for 107 days in 1900. (Note: Before the institution of partisan system, Martin was appointed premier on February 28, 1900. His ministry was defeated the day after on a motion of no confidence; he remained premier until he was ousted in the 1900 election.) Resigned leadership prior to 1903 election.
2	James Alexander MacDonald	October 19, 1903 – October 1909	First formally recognized leader of the Opposition of the province
3	John Oliver	October 1909 – March 1912	First of two periods as leader
4	Harlan Carey Brewster	March 1912 – March 1, 1918	18th premier of British Columbia, 1916–1918. Liberal party shut out of the legislature 1912–1916.
(3)	John Oliver	March 1, 1918 – August 17, 1927	19th premier of British Columbia, 1918–1927. Second of two periods as leader.
5	John Duncan MacLean	August 17, 1927 – October 1928	20th premier of British Columbia, 1927–1928
6	Thomas Dufferin Pattullo	October 1928 – December 9, 1941	22nd premier of British Columbia, 1933–1941. Interim leader from October 1928 – January 1929.
7	John Hart	December 9, 1941 – December 29, 1947	23rd premier of British Columbia, 1941–1947
8	Byron Ingemar Johnson	December 29, 1947 – April 1953	24th premier of British Columbia, 1947–1952
9	Arthur Laing	April 1953 – May 1959	
10	Ray Perrault	May 1959 – October 1968	
11	Patrick Lucey McGeer	October 1968 – May 22, 1972	
12	David Anderson	May 22, 1972 – September 28, 1975	
13	Gordon Gibson	September 28, 1975 – February 19, 1979	
14	Jev Tothill	February 19, 1979 – May 25, 1981	Liberal party shut out of the legislature
15	Shirley McLoughlin	May 25, 1981 – March 31, 1984	Liberal party shut out of the legislature
16	Art Lee	March 31, 1984 – October 30, 1987	Liberal party shut out of the legislature
17	Gordon Wilson	October 30, 1987 – September 11, 1993	Leader of the Opposition, 1991–1993
18	Gordon Campbell	September 11, 1993 – February 26, 2011	34th premier of British Columbia, 2001–2011
19	Christy Clark	February 26, 2011 – August 4, 2017	35th premier of British Columbia, 2011–2017
*	Rich Coleman	August 4, 2017 – February 3, 2018	Interim leader, Leader of the Opposition
20	Andrew Wilkinson	February 3, 2018 – November 21, 2020 (Note: Wilkinson officially resigned as party leader later, on February 17, 2021.)	Leader of the Opposition
*	Shirley Bond	November 23, 2020 – February 5, 2022	Interim leader, Leader of the Opposition
21	Kevin Falcon	February 5, 2022 – October 27, 2026	Leader of the Opposition, oversaw change in party name from BC Liberals to BC United. No seats in the legislature as of 2024 British Columbia general election.

== Election results ==
Election	Leader	Candidates	Votes	%	Seats	+/−	Position	Legislative role	Notes
1903	Joseph Martin (de facto) (Note: Martin resigned leadership on June 3, 1903. Party opted to not call a leadership convention in anticipation of imminent election call, leaving leadership question for the post election caucus to decide.)	39	22,715	37.78%	17 / 42	N/A	▲2nd	Opposition	Conservative majority
1907	James Alexander MacDonald	40	234,816	37.15%	13 / 42	▼4	2nd	Opposition	Conservative majority
1909	James Alexander MacDonald	36	33,675	33.21%	2 / 42	▼11	2nd (tied)	Opposition	Conservative majority
1912	Harlan Carey Brewster	19	21,443	25.37%	0 / 42	▼2	▼ no seats	No seats	Conservative majority
1916	Harlan Carey Brewster	45	89,892	50.00%	36 / 47	▲36	▲1st	Majority	
1920	John Oliver	45	134,167	37.89%	25 / 47	▼11	1st	Majority	
1924	John Oliver	46	108,323	31.34%	23 / 48	▼2	1st	Minority	
1928	John Duncan Maclean	45	144,872	40.04%	12 / 48	▼11	▼2nd	Opposition	Conservative majority
1933	Duff Pattullo	47	159,131	41.74%	34 / 47	▲23	▲1st	Majority	
1937	Duff Pattullo	48	156,074	37.34%	31 / 48	▼3	1st	Majority	
1941	Duff Pattullo	48	149,525	32.94%	21 / 48	▼10	1st	Minority	
1941	Duff Pattullo	48	149,525	32.94%	21 / 48	▼10	1st	Coalition majority (Note: After the election, a coalition government was formed by the Conservative and Liberal members. T. D. Patullo, the Liberal leader at the time, objected; he stepped down and sat as a Liberal, giving the coalition 32 seats.)	Coalition with Conservative Party
1945	John Hart	47	261,147	55.83%	37 / 48	N/A	1st	Coalition majority (Note: In the 1945 and 1949 elections, the Liberal Party ran in coalition with the Conservative Party. Results compared to Liberal plus Conservative total from previous election.)	Coalition with Conservative Party
1949	Boss Johnson	48	428,773	61.35%	39 / 48	▲1	1st	Coalition majority	Coalition with Conservative Party
1952 (Note: The 1952 and 1953 elections used the alternative voting system. Rather than marking the ballot with an X, numbers were to be placed opposite the names in order of choice. If, after the first count, no candidate received an absolute simple majority, the candidate with the fewest votes was dropped, and the second choices distributed among the remaining candidates. This process continued until a candidate emerged with the requisite majority vote. Some voters only indicated a first choice (plumping), and others did not utilize the full range available. Consequently, as the counts progressed, some ballots would be exhausted and total valid votes would decline, thereby reducing the absolute majority required to be elected. In multi-member ridings, there were as many ballots as members to be elected, distinguished by colour and letters.)	Boss Johnson	48	180,289 (Note: Election was held under instant-runoff voting; the final popular vote count was 170,674.)	23.46% (Note: Election was held under instant-runoff voting; the final popular vote percent was 25.26%.)	6 / 48	N/A	▼3rd	Third party	Social Credit minority
1953	Arthur Laing	48	171,671 (Note: Election was held under instant-runoff voting; the final popular vote count was 154,090.)	23.59% (Note: Election was held under instant-runoff voting; the final popular vote count was 23.36%.)	4 / 48	▼2	3rd	Third party	Social Credit majority
1956	Arthur Laing	52	177,922	21.77%	2 / 52	▼2	3rd	No status	Social Credit majority
1960	Ray Perrault	50	208,249	20.90%	4 / 52	▲2	3rd	Third party	Social Credit majority
1963	Ray Perrault	51	193,363	19.98%	5 / 52	▲1	3rd	Third party	Social Credit majority
1966	Ray Perrault	53	152,155	20.24%	6 / 55	▲1	3rd	Third party	Social Credit majority
1969	Patrick Lucey McGeer	55	186,235	19.03%	5 / 55	▼1	3rd	Third party	Social Credit majority
1972	David Anderson	53	185,640	16.40%	5 / 55	Steady	3rd	Third party	NDP majority
1975	Gordon Gibson	49	93,379	7.24%	1 / 55	▼4	3rd (tied)	No status	Social Credit majority
1979	Jev Tothill	5	6,662	0.47%	0 / 57	▼1	▼ no seats	No seats	Social Credit majority
1983	Shirley McLoughlin	52	44,442	2.69%	0 / 57	Steady	Steady	No seats	Social Credit majority
1986	Art Lee	55	130,505	6.74%	0 / 69	Steady	Steady	No seats	Social Credit majority
1991	Gordon Wilson	71	486,208	33.25%	17 / 75	▲17	▲2nd	Opposition	NDP majority
1996	Gordon Campbell	75	661,929	41.82%	33 / 75	▲16	2nd	Opposition	NDP majority
2001	Gordon Campbell	79	916,888	57.62%	77 / 79	▲44	▲1st	Majority	
2005	Gordon Campbell	79	772,945	46.08%	46 / 79	▼31	1st	Majority	
2009	Gordon Campbell	85	751,792	45.83%	49 / 85	▲3	1st	Majority	
2013	Christy Clark	85	723,618	44.41%	49 / 85	Steady	1st	Majority	
2017	Christy Clark	87	735,104	40.85%	43 / 87	▼6	1st	Minority	
2017	Christy Clark	87	735,104	40.85%	43 / 87	▼6	1st	Opposition	NDP minority with Green Party confidence and supply
2020	Andrew Wilkinson	87	636,759	33.77%	28 / 87	▼15	▼2nd	Opposition	NDP majority
Changed name from BC Liberals to BC United in 2023
2024	Kevin Falcon	Withdrew candidates from election			0 / 93	▼28	▼ (No seats)	No seats (Note: On August 28, 2024, shortly before the election writ was to be dropped, the party announced it was suspending its campaign and would endorse the BC Conservative Party in order to avoid vote-splitting. Several BCU candidates were to run as Conservatives instead as part of an agreement between the two parties.)	NDP majority with Green Party confidence and supply
2026	Kevin Falcon	Did not contest			0 / 93	Steady	(No seats)	No seats	Conservative majority
Party deregistered on October 24, 2026

Source: Elections BC

== BC Young Liberals ==
BC Young Liberals (later known as BC United Youth after 2023) was the youth wing of the party. The executive board was elected at an annual general meeting and was composed of five youth members: president, vice president outreach, vice president events, vice president operations, and vice president communications. As of 2024, these positions were held by Harman Khosa, James Lehmann, Olivia Bray (formerly Olivia Wankling), Mark Dhillon, and Teddy O'Donnell, respectively.

== See also ==
- List of political parties in British Columbia
- List of premiers of British Columbia
- List of British Columbia general elections
- Sales taxes in British Columbia
