= 1949 British Columbia general election =

Canadian provincial election

← 1945	June 15, 1949	1952 →

48 seats of the Legislative Assembly of British Columbia 25 seats needed for a majority
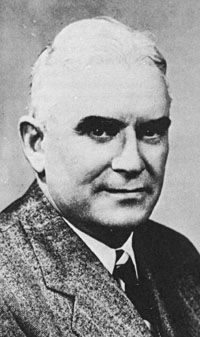

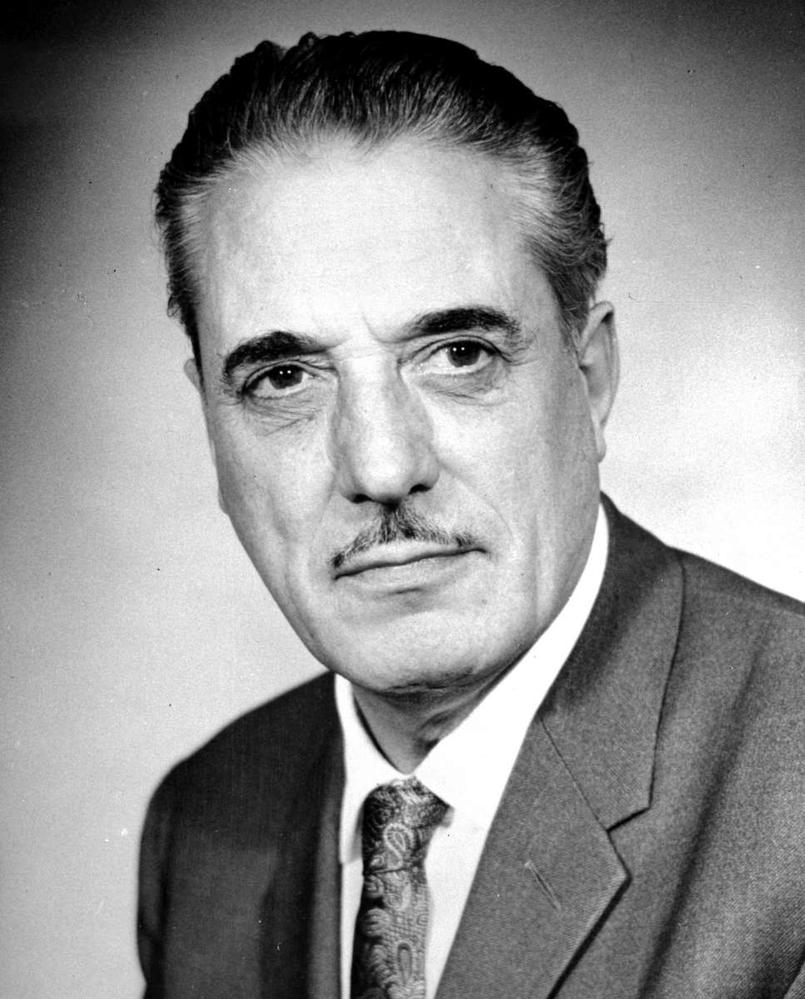
	First party	Second party
Leader	Boss Johnson (Liberal leader)	Harold Winch
Party	Liberal-Conservative Coalition	Co-operative Commonwealth
Leader since	1947	1938
Leader's seat	New Westminster	Vancouver East
Last election	37	10
Seats won	39	7
Seat change	▲2	▼3
Popular vote	428,773	245,284
Percentage	61.35%	35.10%
Swing	▲5.52pp	▼2.52pp
Premier before election
Boss Johnson
Coalition
Premier after election
Boss Johnson
Coalition

The 1949 British Columbia general election was the 22nd general election in the Province of British Columbia, Canada. It was held to elect members of the Legislative Assembly of British Columbia. The election was called on April 16, 1949, and held on June 15, 1949. The new legislature met for the first time on February 14, 1950.

The centre-right coalition formed by the Liberal and Conservative parties in order to defeat the social democratic Co-operative Commonwealth Federation in the 1945 election increased its share of the vote and its majority in the legislature.

Three different social credit groupings nominated or endorsed candidates in the election: the Social Credit Party, the Social Credit League, and the Union of Electors.

== Results ==
Elections to the 22nd Legislative Assembly of British Columbia (1949)
Political party	Party leader	MLAs				Votes			
Political party	Party leader	Candidates	1945	1949	±	#	±	%	± (pp)
Coalition	Boss Johnson Herbert Anscomb	48	37	39	2	428,773	167,626	61.35	5.52
Co-operative Commonwealth	Harold Winch	48	10	7	3▼	245,284	69,324	35.10	2.52▼
Labour		1	1	1	Steady	1,483	88	0.21	0.09▼
Independent		7	–	1	1	5,163	3,631	0.74	0.41
Social Credit alliance split (Note: Elections BC summary table tabulation errors corrected for SCP and SCL)									
█ Social Credit League		9	–	–	–	7,112		1.02	
█ Social Credit		7	–	–	–	4,424		0.63	
█ Union of Electors		12	–	–	–	2,790		0.40	
Social Credit total						14,326	7,699▲	2.05	0.63▲
Labor-Progressive		2	–	–	–	1,660	14,819	0.24	3.28▼
Independent Conservative		1	–	–	–	1,241	1,241	0.18	New
People's CCF		1	–	–	–	470	2,316	0.07	0.53▼
Socialist Labour		1	–	–	–	286	1	0.04	0.02▼
People's Party of BC		1	–	–	–	137	137	0.02	New
Total		138	48	48		698,823		100.00%	
Rejected ballots						9,891	5,992▲		
Actual voters who voted						477,999	179,612▲	73.64%	10.98▲
Registered voters						649,019	172,797▲		

Seats and popular vote by party
Party	Seats	Votes	Change (pp)
█ Coalition	39 / 48	61.35%	5.52
█ Co-operative Commonwealth	7 / 48	35.10%	-2.52
█ Social Credit	0 / 48	2.05%	0.63
█ Labor-Progressive	0 / 48	0.24%	-3.28
█ Other	2 / 48	1.26%	-0.35

== MLAs elected ==
Alberni: James Mowat
Atlin: Frank Calder
Burnaby: Ernest Winch
Cariboo: Angus MacLean
Chilliwack: Leslie Harvey Eyres
Columbia: Thomas King
Comox: Herbert John Welch
Cowichan-Newcastle: Andrew Mowatt Whisker
Cranbrook: Leo Nimsick
Delta: Alexander Campbell Hope
Dewdney: Roderick Charles MacDonald
Esquimalt: Charles Taschereau Beard
Fernie: Thomas Aubert Uphill
Fort George: Henry Robson Bowman
Grand Forks-Greenwood: Rupert Haggen
Kamloops: Sidney John Smith
Kaslo-Slocan: Randolph Harding
Lillooet: Ernest Crawford Carson
Mackenzie: B. Milton MacIntyre
Nanaimo and the Islands: George Sharratt Pearson
Nelson-Creston: Walter Hendricks
New Westminster: Boss Johnson
North Okanagan: Charles William Morrow
North Vancouver: John Henry Cates
Oak Bay: Herbert Anscomb
Omineca: Robert Cecil Steele
Peace River: Glen Everton Braden
Prince Rupert: John Duncan McRae
Revelstoke: Arvid Lundell
Rossland-Trail: Alexander Douglas Turnbull
Saanich: Arthur James Richard Ash
Salmon Arm: Arthur Brown Ritchie
Similkameen: Maurice Finnerty
Skeena: Edward Tourtellotte Kenney
South Okanagan: W. A. C. Bennett
Vancouver-Burrard: Donald Cameron Brown
Vancouver-Burrard: John Groves Gould
Vancouver Centre: Allan James McDonell
Vancouver Centre: Gordon Sylvester Wismer
Vancouver East: Arthur James Turner
Vancouver East: Harold Winch
Vancouver-Point Grey: Albert Reginald MacDougall
Vancouver-Point Grey: Tilly Rolston
Vancouver-Point Grey: Leigh Stevenson
Victoria City: Nancy Hodges
Victoria City: Daniel John Proudfoot
Victoria City: William Thomas Straith
Yale: John J. Gillis

=== Synopsis of results ===
Results by riding - 1949 British Columbia general election (single-member districts)
Riding	Winning party						Votes							
Name	1945	Party	Votes	Share	Margin #	Margin %	Coal	CCF	SCP	SCL	UoE	Ind	Oth	Total
Alberni	Coal	Ind	3,290	42.84%	1,161	15.12%	1,638	2,129	–	–	–	3,290	622	7,679
Atlin	Coal	CCF	376	50.40%	6	0.80%	370	376	–	–	–	–	–	746
Burnaby	CCF	CCF	11,025	50.90%	1,044	4.82%	9,981	11,025	–	655	–	–	–	21,661
Cariboo	Coal	Coal	2,653	66.88%	1,339	33.76%	2,653	1,314	–	–	–	–	–	3,967
Chilliwack	Coal	Coal	6,847	57.17%	4,135	34.52%	6,847	2,712	–	2,417	–	–	–	11,976
Columbia	Coal	Coal	1,288	68.91%	707	37.82%	1,288	581	–	–	–	–	–	1,869
Comox	Coal	Coal	7,596	59.19%	2,358	18.38%	7,596	5,238	–	–	–	–	–	12,834
Cowichan-Newcastle	CCF	Coal	5,505	56.19%	1,311	13.38%	5,505	4,194	–	–	38	60	–	9,797
Cranbrook	Coal	CCF	3,026	50.53%	63	1.06%	2,963	3,026	–	–	–	–	–	5,989
Delta	Coal	Coal	12,203	49.59%	1,093	4.44%	12,203	11,110	1,293	–	–	–	–	24,606
Dewdney	Coal	Coal	8,127	49.08%	523	3.16%	8,127	7,604	–	829	–	–	–	16,560
Esquimalt	Coal	Coal	4,219	51.26%	1,731	21.03%	4,219	2,488	–	–	92	191	1,241	8,231
Fernie	Lab	Lab	1,483	39.09%	9	0.24%	1,474	837	–	–	–	–	1,483	3,794
Fort George	CCF	Coal	3,232	59.86%	1,065	19.72%	3,232	2,167	–	–	–	–	–	5,399
Grand Forks-Greenwood	Coal	CCF	922	44.14%	49	2.35%	873	922	–	–	–	294	–	2,089
Kamloops	Coal	Coal	4,992	64.47%	2,241	28.94%	4,992	2,751	–	–	–	–	–	7,743
Kaslo-Slocan	CCF	CCF	1,633	53.19%	196	6.38%	1,437	1,633	–	–	–	–	–	3,070
Lillooet	Coal	Coal	2,339	62.83%	1,159	31.14%	2,339	1,180	–	–	–	204	–	3,723
Mackenzie	CCF	Coal	5,787	55.57%	1,161	11.14%	5,787	4,626	–	–	–	–	–	10,413
Nanaimo and the Islands	Coal	Coal	5,860	61.50%	2,296	24.09%	5,860	3,564	–	–	104	–	–	9,528
Nelson-Creston	Coal	Coal	4,783	60.04%	2,108	26.46%	4,783	2,675	–	508	–	–	–	7,966
New Westminster	Coal	Coal	7,969	61.57%	3,460	26.73%	7,969	4,509	328	–	–	–	137	12,943
North Okanagan	Coal	Coal	4,966	60.95%	2,309	28.34%	4,966	2,657	525	–	–	–	–	8,148
North Vancouver	Coal	Coal	12,586	69.57%	7,082	39.14%	12,586	5,504	–	–	–	–	–	18,090
Oak Bay	Coal	Coal	5,918	84.21%	5,028	71.55%	5,918	890	–	–	220	–	–	7,028
Omineca	CCF	Coal	1,885	61.60%	710	23.20%	1,885	1,175	–	–	–	–	–	3,060
Peace River	CCF	Coal	2,342	49.69%	441	9.35%	2,342	1,901	–	–	–	–	470	4,713
Prince Rupert	CCF	Coal	2,971	56.41%	675	12.82%	2,971	2,296	–	–	–	–	–	5,267
Revelstoke	Coal	Coal	1,311	50.95%	49	1.90%	1,311	1,262	–	–	–	–	–	2,573
Rossland-Trail	Coal	Coal	5,910	56.30%	1,322	12.60%	5,910	4,588	–	–	–	–	–	10,498
Saanich	Coal	Coal	9,998	66.14%	5,352	35.41%	9,998	4,646	–	–	473	–	–	15,117
Salmon Arm	Coal	Coal	2,529	60.07%	848	20.14%	2,529	1,681	–	–	–	–	–	4,210
Similkameen	Coal	Coal	5,744	58.78%	1,716	17.56%	5,744	4,028	–	–	–	–	–	9,772
Skeena	Coal	Coal	2,048	73.20%	1,298	46.40%	2,048	750	–	–	–	–	–	2,798
South Okanagan	Coal	Coal	6,555	58.40%	1,886	16.80%	6,555 (Note: W. A. C. Bennett had resigned in 1948 to contest the federal byelection in Yale, which he lost. In the interim, Bob Browne-Clayton was elected for the Coalition in the provincial byelection, but Bennett returned for the general election.)	4,669	–	–	–	–	–	11,224
Yale	Coal	Coal	1,407	46.90%	542	18.07%	1,407	865	–	–	–	728	–	3,000

= open seat
= winning candidate was in previous Legislature
= incumbent had switched allegiance
= previously incumbent in another riding
= not incumbent; was previously elected to the Legislature
= incumbency arose from byelection gain
= other incumbents renominated
= part of 1945 Social Credit alliance
= multiple candidates

Results by riding - 1949 British Columbia general election (multiple-member districts)
Riding		Winning party		Votes							
Name	MLAs	1945	1949	Coal	CCF	SCP	SCL	UoE	Ind	Oth	Total
Vancouver-Burrard	2	2	2	40,156	21,774	1,258	–	95	396	–	63,679
Vancouver Centre	2	2	2	29,171	17,969	–	814	–	–	286	48,240
Vancouver East	2	2	2	34,077	39,815	1,020	–	109	–	1,038	76,059
Vancouver-Point Grey	3	3	3	109,782	35,134	–	1,889	280	–	–	147,085
Victoria City	3	3	3	47,281	17,019	–	–	1,379	–	–	65,679

== See also ==
- List of British Columbia political parties
