= Terminal City Club =

Private club in Vancouver, British Columbia

- Formation: 13 March 1899
- Type: Private members' club
- Headquarters: 837 West Hastings Street
- Website: tcclub.com

The Terminal City Club is a private social club in Vancouver, British Columbia that has existed since 1899. The club originated in 1892 as the Metropolitan Club, and in 1899 reorganised under its current name. The club was founded as a gentlemen's club, but in 1991, members voted to convert to a mixed-sex membership. The Terminal City is, along with the Vancouver Club, one of the city's two historic social clubs. While traditionally the Vancouver Club catered to the city's old money, the Terminal City was more liberal in its membership policies.

From 1912 to 1996, the club occupied the first three floors of the Metropolitan Building on West Hastings Street, of which it acquired ownership in 1944. In 1996 the club demolished its old building and built the 30-storey, multi-use Terminal City Club Tower, which opened in 1998. The building includes residences, offices, and a hotel, while the club occupies quarters built off the back of the tower facing Cordova Street. As with many former Victorian gentlemen's clubs, the Terminal City has evolved in recent decades into a more informal club with an emphasis on fitness and business networking.

== History ==
=== Origins in the Metropolitan Club, 1892–1899 ===
The history of the Terminal City Club runs parallel to the history of the city itself. The City of Vancouver was incorporated in April 1886, and in May 1887, the first train arrived on the new Canadian Pacific Railway, making the city the railway's western terminus. The Terminal City Club was founded as the Metropolitan Club. While the origins of the club are enigmatic, its typical founding date is given as 1892. However, the club likely originated in the Vancouver Chess and Draughts Club, which was founded in 1889. The evidence that the Metropolitan developed out of the Chess and Draughts is that the Chess and Draughts previously occupied the same building as the Metropolitan, the Chess and Draughts ceased to exist after 1892, and the Metropolitan had for a decade a private meeting room called the Chess and Drafts Room.

How or why the Chess and Draughts became the Metropolitan Club is unclear, however, the first mention of the new club came in October 1892, when the Victoria Colonist announced the election of its officers. The club may have been incorporated officially on 5 December 1892, as the following year, the club held a first anniversary concert on this date. The club's first home was the Ferguson Building, located at the corner of Hastings and Richards. It had been built in 1888 and was owned by Alfred Graham Ferguson, who would become the club's president in 1897. Around 1893 the club moved to O'Brien Hall at Hastings and Homer.

=== Early years of the Terminal City Club, 1899–1911 ===
In 1897, the owner of O'Brien Hall began renovations that lasted two years. During the renovations, the club fought the landlord over lost revenues, and began withholding rent payments. By 1899, the arrears amounted to $1,200, and the landlord threatened to liquidate the club's assets unless the sum was paid. In response, members of the Metropolitan founded a joint-stock company called the Terminal City Club Limited, to which the former club's assets and cash were transferred. The Terminal City Club guaranteed payment of the Metropolitan's liabilities, and the old club was wound up. Eventually, the new club settled with the landlord for less than the original amount owed.

Following its creation, the Terminal City Club left O'Brien Hall and moved to a new building constructed by Ferguson at the northeast corner of Hastings and Richards, then in 1907 moved to the Clarke and Stuart Building at Cordova and Seymour. At its first annual meeting in 1900, the club had around 100 members and had membership revenue of $2,400. By 1911, the club had grown to 700 members with earnings of $18,000 and assets of $135,000. Among the members who joined in the 1900s were Louis D. Taylor, Sir Charles Tupper, Victor Odlum, William Harold Malkin, and Benjamin Tingley Rogers. In 1909, the provincial government proposed legislation that would allow provincial police to enter and inspect liquor sales unannounced at any private club. Representatives of the Terminal City Club, Vancouver Club, and Union Club of British Columbia protested to attorney general William John Bowser, himself a member of the Terminal City, for an exception. The clubs were granted a carve-out whereby they would be monitored only by municipal police.

=== Life in the Metropolitan Building, 1912–1996 ===
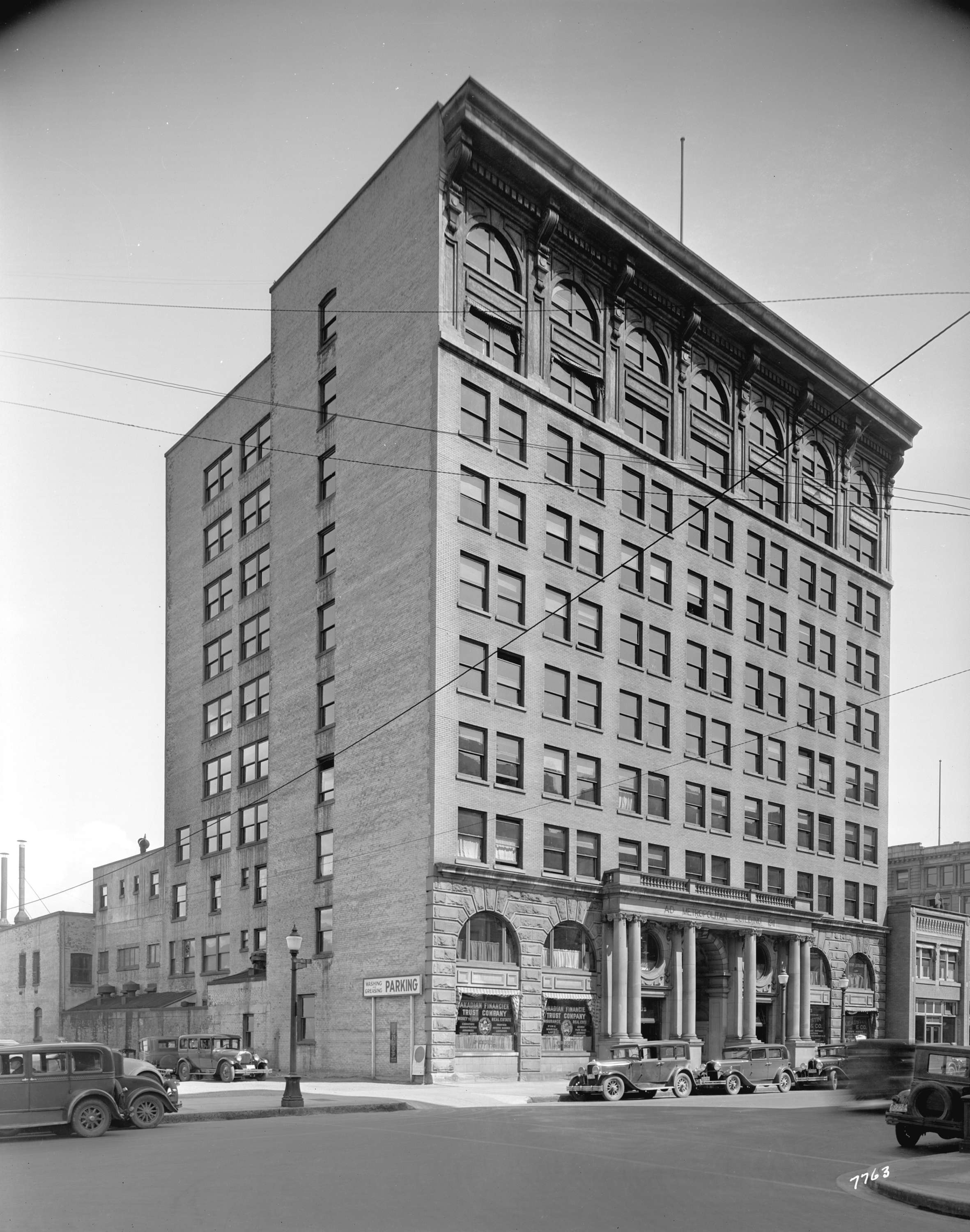
From 1912 to 1998, the club occupied the first three floors of the Metropolitan Building. It was designed by J. S. Helyer & Son.

In 1909, the club purchased a 92-foot lot on West Hastings Street beside the Vancouver Club. However, the club was unable alone to finance and build a new home. A group of investors founded the Metropolitan Building Company Limited, to which the club transferred its property in return for $25,000 of shares in the company. Total funds lent to the company were $320,000, made up of a $265,000 mortgage loan from the Yorkshire Trust Company, and the remaining money lent from members. Construction of the ten-storey Metropolitan Building began in 1909 or 1910 and continued through 1911. The building was designed by architect John Shaw Helyer and his son Maurice Helyer. The club would occupy the first two floors, while the upper floors would be rented as offices. The new club quarters opened officially on 10 January 1912.

The war years were difficult on the club. Membership dropped from 620 in 1913 to 400 in 1918; this number rose only to 500 by 1923. In 1915, the club introduced a corporate membership, whereby a company could buy a membership and appoint employees as club members. During this period, the mortgage holders defaulted on payments and the Metropolitan Building was offered to the club for $10,000, which it did not accept. By 1917, the club was unable to pay its $10,000 annual rent in the building, and the payment was reduced to $500 monthly. Also during the war, the government of British Columbia introduced prohibition. This lasted from 1917 to 1921, after which time club members were allowed to keep alcohol on site but not to buy it from the club. Ten club members were killed in the war, and after the armistice, the club set up the Terminal City Club Memorial Scholarship at the University of British Columbia in their honour, which is given to the child of a club member. Recipients have included Earle Birney and Larry Giovando.

In 1925, the club purchased a lot further down Hastings Street with the intention of building a new clubhouse. Ultimately, it decided against a rebuild and instead refurbished its quarters in the Metropolitan. The lot was sold in 1927 to the Quadra Club, which built its clubhouse there. Over the next year, the club spent $67,000 on renovations, and the renovated quarters were opened officially on 4 April 1928. Also in 1928, the club began its art collection when it purchased nine paintings from G. W. Kindersley. In 1928, Francis Arthur Sutton became a member for a short time.

After the Great Depression began, the club was no longer able to pay its $1,630 monthly rent. It renegotiated its rate with the Yorkshire Trust Company, who allowed a reduction to $1,000. The club offered the trust company the option to foreclose the club, at which time the club would declare bankruptcy and wind up its operations, but the trust company did not want to end up with three floors of space for which it was unable to find a tenant. In 1937, rent was changed to $15,000 annually. After the Quadra Club failed in 1937, around 40 joined the Terminal City Club with their entrance fees waived. Beginning in 1947, four mayors of Vancouver were members or former members of the club: Gerry McGeer, Charles E. Jones, Charles E. Thompson, and Frederick Hume.

In June 1991, the club's membership voted to become a mixed-sex club.

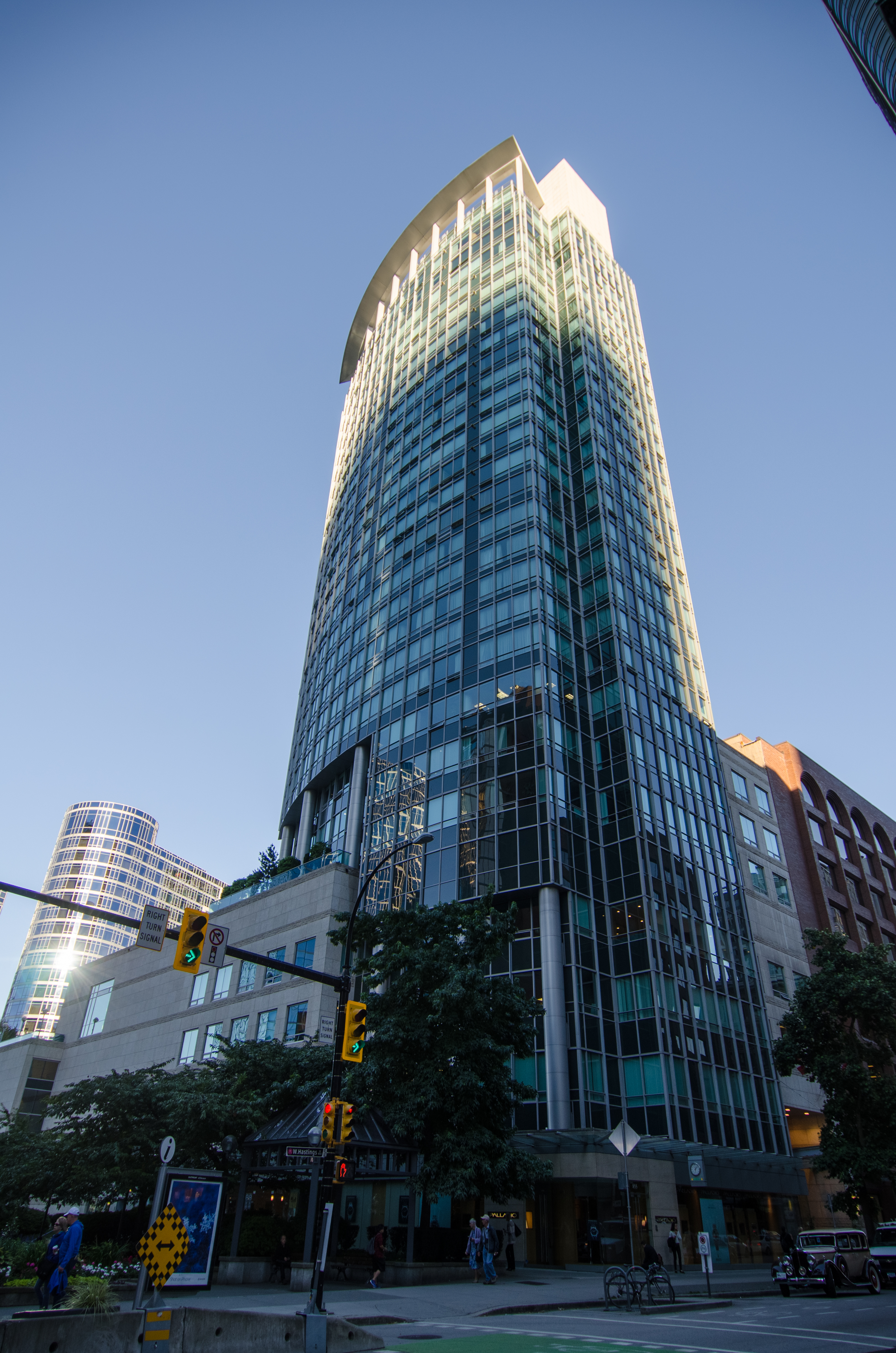
In 1998, the club built the multi-use Terminal City Club Tower, designed by Musson Cattell Mackey in partnership with James K. M. Cheng. The club quarters sit at the back of the building.

== Presidents ==
- 1892 – Frederick Cope
- 1893 – Frederick Cope
- 1894 – R. A. Anderson
- 1895 – H. Collins
- 1896 – H. Collins
- 1897 – A. G. Ferguson
- 1898 – James Garden
- 1899 – A. G. Ferguson
- 1900 – A. G. Ferguson
- 1901 – T. E. Atkins
- 1902 – T. E. Atkins
- 1903 – T. E. Atkins
- 1904 – H. T. Ceperley
- 1905 – H. T. Ceperley
- 1906 – F. T. Walker
- 1907 – E. E. Penzer
- 1908 – J. A. Smith
- 1909 – W. F. Gitchell
- 1910 – D. M. Robinson
- 1911 – J. Ross
- 1912 – R. L. Reid
- 1913 – D. F. Dickson
- 1914 – J. W. Hackett
- 1915 – G. E. Trorey
- 1916 – W. H. MacInnes
- 1917 – F. R. Begg
- 1918 – K. J. Burns
- 1919 – F. G. Crisp
- 1920 – C. E. Disher
- 1921 – O. B. Allan
- 1922 – J. M. Drainie
- 1923 – W. H. Crowe
- 1924 – C. Millard
- 1925 – R. Abernethy
- 1926 – J. R. Read
- 1927 – J. C. McPherson
- 1928 – Dr C. W. Prowd
- 1929 – H. C. Martin
- 1930 – H. R. Montgomery
- 1931 – W. F. Beveridge
- 1931–32 – F. O. Hodgson
- 1932–33 – C. H. Daniels
- 1933–34 – F. Parsons
- 1934–35 – F. B. Lewis
- 1935–36 – W. A. Whyte
- 1936–37 – Donald MacLaren
- 1937–38 – Morley Shier
- 1938–39 – E. B. Ballentine
- 1939–40 – S. N. Colcomb
- 1940–41 – F. W. Fearman
- 1941–42 – W. E. Smith
- 1942–43 – A. W. DeLand
- 1943–44 – Charles Edgar Edgett
- 1944–45 – E. Johnston
- 1945–46 – T. B. Randall
- 1946–47 – W. C. Gibson
- 1947–48 – J. B. Haggart
- 1948–49 – W. S. MacGregor
- 1949–50 – W. H. DeCew
- 1950–51 – H. H. Dingle
- 1951–52 – H. A. Borgerson
- 1952–53 – C. W. Leek
- 1953–54 – C. G. Pritchard
- 1954–55 – A. E. Gibson
- 1955–56 – F. D. Pratt
- 1956–57 – W. M. Anderson
- 1957–58 – L. C. Creery
- 1958–59 – J. J. Robinson
- 1959–60 – Capt. J. S. Clarke
- 1960–61 – J. A. Kyles
- 1961–62 – O. C. Cook
- 1962–63 – W. E. Garnett
- 1963–64 – R. A. D. Berwick
- 1964–65 – S. A. Mowat
- 1965–66 – J. M. Billingsley
- 1966–67 – E. S. Tierney
- 1967–68 – T. R. Fyfe
- 1968–69 – D. M. Mackenzie
- 1969–70 – V. B. Williams
- 1970–71 – W. C. Wright
- 1971–72 – G. Fawcett
- 1972–73 – P. W. Barchard
- 1973–74 – M. J. Lucas
- 1974–75 – H. N. Crompton
- 1975–76 – A. M. Channell
- 1976–77 – D. N. King
- 1977–78 – W. C. Keast
- 1978–79 – C. I. Jacobsen
- 1979–80 – W. J. Esselmont
- 1980–81 – J. M. Ferris
- 1981–82 – H. R. Chisholm
- 1982–83 – R. L. Ward
- 1983–84 – D. A. Hales
- 1984–85 – K. H. Armstrong
- 1985–86 – D. J. Manning
- 1986–87 – M. D. Pollock
- 1987–88 – L. P. Starck
- 1988–89 – W. D. Whiles
- 1989–90 – W. M. Beck
- 1990–91 – W. G. Nugent, L. R. Peterson
- 1991–92 – B. A. Smith

== Club histories ==
- Charles H. Daniels. A Narrative History of the Terminal City Club Limited. Clarke & Stuart Co. Ltd, 1936.
- David R. Williams. Yesterday, Today and Tomorrow: A History of Vancouver's Terminal City Club. D. W. Friesen & Sons Ltd, 1992.
