= Vancouver-Burrard =

Vancouver-Burrard may refer to:

- Vancouver—Burrard (federal electoral district)
- Vancouver-Burrard (provincial electoral district)
