= Vancouver—Burrard (federal electoral district) =

Former federal electoral district in British Columbia, Canada

British Columbia electoral district
- Boundaries at abolition

Defunct federal electoral district
- Legislature: House of Commons
- District created: 1924
- District abolished: 1966
- First contested: 1925
- Last contested: 1965

Vancouver—Burrard was a federal electoral district in British Columbia, Canada, that was represented in the House of Commons of Canada from 1925 to 1968. This riding was created in 1924 from parts of Burrard riding. It was abolished in 1966 when it was redistributed into Vancouver Centre and Vancouver East ridings.

== Historical boundaries ==
1933 representation order

1947 representation order

1952 representation order

== Members of Parliament ==
This riding elected the following members of Parliament:

Parliament	Years	Member	Party
Riding created from Burrard
15th	1925–1926	John Arthur Clark	Conservative
16th	1926–1930	John Arthur Clark	Conservative
17th	1930–1935	Wilfred Hanbury	Liberal
18th	1935–1940	Gerry McGeer	Liberal
19th	1940–1945	Gerry McGeer	Liberal
20th	1945–1949	Charles Merritt	Progressive Conservative
21st	1949–1953	Lorne MacDougall	Liberal
22nd	1953–1957	Lorne MacDougall	Liberal
23rd	1957–1958	John Russell Taylor	Progressive Conservative
24th	1958–1962	John Russell Taylor	Progressive Conservative
25th	1962–1963	Thomas R. Berger	New Democratic
26th	1963–1965	Ron Basford	Liberal
27th	1965–1968	Ron Basford	Liberal
Riding dissolved into Vancouver Centre and Vancouver East

== Election results ==
1965 Canadian federal election
Party	Candidate	Votes	%	±%
Liberal	Ron Basford	10,807	38.70	+1.05
New Democratic	Raymond Parkinson	9,233	33.06	+1.82
Progressive Conservative	Marianne Linnell	5,138	18.40	–5.59
Social Credit	Edward M. Chisholm	2,748	9.84	+3.12
Total valid votes		27,926	99.08	
Total rejected ballots		260	0.92	+0.29
Turnout		28,186	70.46	–7.94
Eligible voters		40,005		
Liberal hold		Swing		–0.38
Source: Library of Parliament

1963 Canadian federal election
Party	Candidate	Votes	%	±%
Liberal	Ron Basford	12,048	37.65	+6.50
New Democratic	Thomas R. Berger	9,998	31.24	–0.23
Progressive Conservative	John Russell Taylor	7,678	23.99	–5.69
Social Credit	George C. Mathews	2,150	6.72	–0.98
Independent Liberal	David Swan	127	0.40	–
Total valid votes		32,001	99.37	
Total rejected ballots		203	0.63	–0.42
Turnout		32,204	78.39	+4.00
Eligible voters		41,081		
Liberal gain from New Democratic		Swing		+3.36
Source: Library of Parliament

1962 Canadian federal election
Party	Candidate	Votes	%	±%
New Democratic	Thomas R. Berger	9,173	31.47	+14.25
Liberal	Ron Basford	9,079	31.15	+13.81
Progressive Conservative	John Russell Taylor	8,651	29.68	–30.86
Social Credit	William Lennox	2,245	7.70	+2.80
Total valid votes		29,148	98.95	
Total rejected ballots		310	1.05	+0.24
Turnout		29,458	74.39	+3.28
Eligible voters		39,599		
New Democratic gain from Progressive Conservative		Swing		+0.22
Change for the New Democrats is based on the Co-operative Commonwealth vote in the 1958 election.
Source: Library of Parliament

1958 Canadian federal election
Party	Candidate	Votes	%	±%
Progressive Conservative	John Russell Taylor	18,001	60.54	+13.97
Liberal	Frank George Perrin Lewis	5,154	17.33	+1.63
Co-operative Commonwealth	Victor Wadham Forster	5,121	17.22	+3.35
Social Credit	William Rose	1,459	4.91	–18.08
Total valid votes		29,735	99.19	
Total rejected ballots		243	0.81	–0.14
Turnout		29,978	71.11	–0.55
Eligible voters		42,155		
Progressive Conservative hold		Swing		+6.17
Source: Library of Parliament

1957 Canadian federal election
Party	Candidate	Votes	%	±%
Progressive Conservative	John Russell Taylor	13,721	46.57	+29.54
Social Credit	Peer Vernon Paynter	6,772	22.98	–4.16
Liberal	Clare Richard James Skatfeld	4,626	15.70	–19.02
Co-operative Commonwealth	Victor Wadham Forster	4,088	13.87	–5.38
Independent	Irving S. Finkleman	259	0.88	–
Total valid votes		29,466	99.05	
Total rejected ballots		284	0.95	+0.28
Turnout		29,750	71.66	+11.96
Eligible voters		41,514		
Progressive Conservative gain from Liberal		Swing		+16.85
Source: Library of Parliament

1953 Canadian federal election
Party	Candidate	Votes	%	±%
Liberal	Lorne MacDougall	9,035	34.72	–1.41
Social Credit	Peer Vernon Paynter	7,063	27.14	–
Co-operative Commonwealth	Gladys Strum	5,010	19.25	–9.43
Progressive Conservative	Buda Brown	4,430	17.03	–18.15
Labor–Progressive	Sidney Zlotnik	482	1.85	–
Total valid votes		26,020	99.33	
Total rejected ballots		176	0.67	–0.38
Turnout		26,196	59.71	–5.94
Eligible voters		43,874		
Liberal hold		Swing		−14.28
Source: Library of Parliament

1949 Canadian federal election
Party	Candidate	Votes	%	±%
Liberal	Lorne MacDougall	10,967	36.14	+14.10
Progressive Conservative	Charles Merritt	10,676	35.18	–2.22
Co-operative Commonwealth	Arnold Webster	8,705	28.68	–2.56
Total valid votes		30,348	98.95	
Total rejected ballots		323	1.05	–0.33
Turnout		30,671	65.65	–13.17
Eligible voters		46,722		
Liberal gain from Progressive Conservative		Swing		+8.16
Source: Library of Parliament

1945 Canadian federal election
Party	Candidate	Votes	%	±%
Progressive Conservative	Charles Merritt	14,677	37.39	+8.54
Co-operative Commonwealth	Arnold Webster	12,264	31.25	–1.48
Liberal	Gerald Vincent Pelton	8,648	22.03	–16.39
Labor–Progressive	Minerva Vivian Cooper	2,249	5.73	–
Social Credit	Peer Vernon Paynter	1,025	2.61	–
Democratic	Dave Bernard Parkin	246	0.63	–
Socialist Labor	Paul Debragh	140	0.36	–
Total valid votes		39,249	98.62	
Total rejected ballots		549	1.38	+0.12
Turnout		39,798	78.81	+2.23
Eligible voters		50,497		
Progressive Conservative gain from Liberal		Swing		+12.47
Source: Library of Parliament

1940 Canadian federal election
Party	Candidate	Votes	%	±%
Liberal	Gerry McGeer	12,617	38.42	+2.11
Co-operative Commonwealth	Arnold Webster	10,745	32.72	–3.57
National Government	Allan James McDonell	9,475	28.85	+10.16
Total valid votes		32,837	98.74	
Total rejected ballots		420	1.26	+0.02
Turnout		33,257	76.58	–2.27
Eligible voters		43,427		
Liberal hold		Swing		+2.84
Source: Library of Parliament

1935 Canadian federal election
Party	Candidate	Votes	%	±%
Liberal	Gerry McGeer	10,215	36.31	–16.52
Co-operative Commonwealth	Arnold Webster	10,209	36.29	–
Conservative	Allan James McDonell	5,259	18.70	–25.44
Reconstruction	Herbert Lorne Wordsworth Turnbull	1,913	6.80	–
Social Credit	William Albert Tutte	534	1.90	–
Total valid votes		28,130	98.76	
Total rejected ballots		353	1.24	+1.24
Turnout		28,483	78.85	+9.28
Eligible voters		36,124		
Liberal hold		Swing		–26.40
Source: Library of Parliament

1930 Canadian federal election
Party	Candidate	Votes	%	±%
Liberal	Wilfred Hanbury	16,619	52.83	+16.08
Conservative	Robert James Hamilton	13,885	44.14	–9.50
Independent	Charles Milton Woodworth	687	2.18	–
Prohibitionist	Edwin Clarke Appleby	266	0.85	–
Total valid votes		31,457	100.00	
Total rejected ballots		–		
Turnout		31,457	69.56	+1.07
Eligible voters		45,220		
Liberal gain from Conservative		Swing		+12.79
Source: Library of Parliament

1926 Canadian federal election
Party	Candidate	Votes	%	±%
Conservative	John Arthur Clark	11,227	53.64	+6.44
Liberal	Wilfred Hanbury	7,692	36.75	–5.41
Labour	William Jamison Curry	2,012	9.61	–1.02
Total valid votes		20,931	100.00	
Total rejected ballots		–		
Turnout		20,931	68.49	–6.15
Eligible voters		30,560		
Conservative hold		Swing		+5.92
Source: Library of Parliament

1925 Canadian federal election
Party	Candidate	Votes	%
Conservative	John Arthur Clark	9,897	47.20
Liberal	Robert Purves McLennan	8,840	42.16
Labour	John Sidaway	2,230	10.64
Total valid votes		20,967	100.00
Total rejected ballots		–	
Turnout		20,967	74.64
Eligible voters		28,090	
This riding was created from parts of Burrard, where Conservative John Arthur Clark was the incumbent.
Source: Library of Parliament

== See also ==
- List of Canadian electoral districts
- Historical federal electoral districts of Canada
