= John Arthur Clark =

Canadian politician

John Arthur Clark CMG, DSO, QC

Member of Parliament for Burrard
- In office December 1921 – October 1925
- Preceded by: Sanford Johnston Crowe
- Succeeded by: riding dissolved

Member of Parliament for Vancouver—Burrard
- In office October 1925 – May 1930
- Preceded by: riding created
- Succeeded by: Wilfred Hanbury

23rd President of the Canadian Bar Association
- In office 1951–1952
- Preceded by: E. Gordon Gowling, K.C.
- Succeeded by: André Taschereau, c.r.

Personal details
- Born: 8 June 1886 Dundas, Ontario
- Died: 18 January 1976 (aged 89) Vancouver, British Columbia
- Party: Conservative
- Spouse(s): Jean A. McGillivray m. 24 June 1914
- Profession: Barrister and solicitor

Military service
- Branch/service: Canadian Expeditionary Force
- Years of service: 1914–1919
- Rank: Brigadier General
- Unit: 72nd Battalion (Seaforth Highlanders of Canada), CEF
- Commands: 7th Canadian Brigade (1918–19); 72nd Battalion (1915–18)
- Battles/wars: First World War: Battle of Vimy Ridge
- Awards: Companion of the Order of St Michael and St George; Distinguished Service Order & Two Bars; Mentioned in Despatches (5)

Brigadier General John Arthur Clark, CMG, DSO & Two Bars, QC (8 June 1886 – 18 January 1976) was a Conservative member of the House of Commons of Canada. He was born in Dundas, Ontario and became a barrister and solicitor.

Clark attended secondary school in Vancouver, then studied at the University of Toronto and Osgoode Hall Law School, earning Bachelor of Arts and Bachelor of Laws degrees. During his career, he founded the law firm Clark Wilson along with his childhood friend and Second-in-Command, Alexander Wilson.

He served as a soldier during World War I, from 1914 to 1918, as commander of the 72nd Seaforth Highlanders and continued with the 7th Canadian Brigade (3rd Canadian Division) until the war's end. His awards include the Companion of the Order of St Michael and St George (CMG) and the Distinguished Service Order (DSO) with two Bars. The second bar to his DSO appeared in The London Gazette in December 1918 and reads as follows:

For most conspicuous gallantry and resourceful leadership. When one of his companies was held up by machine-gun fire from a wood, he led his men forward and by skilful tactics captured the machine guns with their crews. Two days later, when his men were again checked in front of a village, he dashed to the front, and led them to their objective, saving many casualties by his skill and fearlessness.

He was first elected to Parliament at the Burrard riding in the 1921 general election. With riding boundary changes, Clark became a candidate for Vancouver—Burrard and won election there in 1925 and 1926. After completing his third House of Commons term, the 16th Canadian Parliament, Clark left federal politics and did not seek re-election in the 1930 election.

Clark served as president of the Canadian Bar Association from 1951 to 1952.

1921 Canadian federal election: Burrard
Party	Candidate	Votes	%	±%
Conservative	John Arthur Clark	12,240	55.89	–
Liberal	Malcolm Archibald Macdonald	6,960	31.78	+7.03
Independent	John David Harrington	2,699	12.33	–
Total valid votes		21,899	100.00	
Total rejected ballots		–		
Turnout		21,899	61.75	–35.10
Eligible voters		35,463		
Conservative gain from Government (Liberal–Unionist)		Swing		–
Source: Library of Parliament
