= Mackenzie Valley Pipeline Inquiry =

Canadian government inquiry

The Mackenzie Valley Pipeline Inquiry, also known as the Berger Inquiry after its head Justice Thomas Berger, was commissioned by the Government of Canada on March 21, 1974, to investigate the social, environmental, and economic impact of a proposed gas pipeline that would run through the Yukon and the Mackenzie River Valley of the Northwest Territories. This proposed pipeline became known as the Mackenzie Valley Pipeline.

The inquiry cost C$5.3 million, and produced over 40,000 pages of text and evidence, comprising 283 volumes. The commission recommended that no pipeline be built through the northern Yukon and that a pipeline through the Mackenzie Valley should be delayed for 10 years.

== Proceeding ==
The commissioner of the inquiry was Justice Thomas Berger, who heard testimony from diverse groups with an interest in the pipeline. Fourteen groups became full participants in the inquiry, attending all meetings and testifying before the commission. The inquiry was notable for the voice that it gave to the aboriginal people whose traditional territory the pipeline would traverse.

Berger travelled extensively in the North in preparation for the hearings. He took his commission to all 35 communities along the Mackenzie River Valley, as well as in other cities across Canada, to gauge public reaction. In his travels he met with Aboriginal (Dene, Inuit, Métis) and non-aboriginal residents. He held formal hearings in Yellowknife to get the views of experts about the proposal. Following this, he held community hearings across the Northwest Territories and the Yukon, and this played an important role in shaping his views.

== Findings ==
The first volume of Berger's report was released on June 9, 1977, and followed with a second volume several months later. Titled Northern Frontier, Northern Homeland, the two-volume report highlighted the fact that while the Mackenzie Valley could be the site of the "biggest project in the history of free enterprise", it was also home to many peoples whose lives would be immeasurably changed by the pipeline.

=== Environmental impact ===
The Berger Report concluded that the northern Yukon was too susceptible to environmental harm. Berger cautioned that a gas pipeline would be a precursor to an oil pipeline. The energy transportation corridor thus created would require an immense infrastructure of roads, airports, maintenance bases and new settlements to support it. The impact on the ecosystem (both the natural habitat and its people) would be equivalent to building a railway across Canada. The commission even recommended that no energy corridor be built in the Mackenzie Delta region.

At the same time, the commission saw no significant environmental risk further south through the Mackenzie Valley. Berger suggested that a number of sanctuaries and protected areas be created for threatened and endangered species, particularly Porcupine caribou, white whales, several bird species, and other animals inhabiting the Arctic National Wildlife Refuge (ANWR).

=== Economic impact ===
The commission found no significant economic benefit from the pipelines. The report concluded that large-scale projects based on non-renewable energy sources rarely provide long-term employment, and that those locals that did find work during construction could only fill low-skill, low-wage positions. In addition, Berger feared that pipeline development would undermine local economies which relied on hunting, fishing, and trapping, possibly even increasing economic hardship in the area. Berger ultimately found that the economy of the region would not be harmed by not building the pipeline.

=== Social impact ===
The commission believed that the pipeline process had not taken native culture seriously and that any development needed to conform to the wishes of those who lived there. Berger predicted that the "social consequences of the pipeline will not only be serious—they will be devastating." The commission was particularly concerned about the role of natives in development plans. At the time the report was released, there were several ongoing negotiations over native land claims in the area, and Berger suggested that pipeline construction be delayed until those claims were settled.

The commission found that the local population would not accept development activity without some native control. In addition, land claims were part of a broader native rights issues that needed to be settled between the government and the First Nations. In Berger's view, rapid development in the north would preclude settlement of those important issues because of the influx of non-native populations and growing business interests.

== Recommendations ==
Justice Berger recommended a ten-year moratorium to deal with critical issues, such as settling Aboriginal land claims and setting aside key conservation areas, before attempting to build the proposed pipeline.

Initiated in 1999 by Aboriginal leaders from across the Northwest Territories, the Mackenzie Valley Pipeline was the second attempt to build a gas pipeline down the Mackenzie Valley.

== See also ==
- Abe Okpik
