= John Russell Taylor (politician) =

Canadian politician

Member of the Canadian Parliament for Vancouver—Burrard
- In office 1957–1962
- Preceded by: Lorne MacDougall
- Succeeded by: Thomas R. Berger

Personal details
- Born: November 28, 1917 Vancouver, British Columbia, Canada
- Died: February 28, 2002 (aged 84)
- Party: Progressive Conservative

John Russell Taylor (November 28, 1917 – February 28, 2002) was a Canadian politician and immigration lawyer. He was the Progressive Conservative Member of Parliament from Vancouver—Burrard from 1957 to 1962.

== Early life ==
John Taylor was born in Vancouver on November 28, 1917. He was the second son of Fred "Cyclone" Taylor, a member of the Hockey Hall of Fame. He was raised in Vancouver and later attended the University of Toronto, during which he helped the university's hockey team win two intercollegiate championships.

After earning a bachelor of arts degree Taylor enlisted in the Canadian Army in 1942, being discharged in 1946 after rising to the rank of Captain. He was called to the British Columbia bar as a lawyer the same year.

During the 1950s Taylor owned the Kerrisdale Monarchs, a senior semi-professional hockey team based in his Vancouver neighbourhood.

== Political career ==
Taylor was first elected as a Member of Parliament for Vancouver--Burrard during the 1957 general election. He used an advertising campaign that featured signs with only a pair of stencilled foot prints, no slogan, no candidate name and no party affiliation. The signs created a buzz, after which their origin was revealed and then the slogan "Follow John" was added to them. The Diefenbaker campaign took up the slogan and used it across Canada.

Taylor was easily re-elected in the constituency during the Progressive Conservative sweep of the 1958 general election. He was subsequently defeated in 1962, coming a close third to Thomas Berger of the New Democratic Party and Ron Basford for the Liberals. He was again defeated in the 1963 general election, coming third again, this time to Basford and then Berger.

In 1974 he ran for election in Vancouver Kingsway, coming third to Liberal Simma Holt, and New Democrat Dennis Mulroney. He did not run for election again, though he regularly worked in various election campaigns, the last being John Reynolds', then of the Canadian Alliance, in 2000.

== Legal career ==
Taylor was a member of the Law Society of British Columbia from 1946 until his retirement in 1988. He was one of the first lawyers in Canada practising mainly in immigration law matters, due in part to his father's lengthy tenure as head of the Immigration Branch in British Columbia.

Taylor gained recognition in early 1957 with his representation of Christian George Hanna, "the man without a country," whose case was used by the opposition Progressive Conservative Party in the House of Commons to attack the then Liberal government's handling of immigration matters and the Minister of Citizenship and Immigration, Jack Pickersgill.

In the 1960s Taylor was counsel for Robert Brooks, an American citizen who was granted landing as an immigrant in 1963. Brooks was ordered deported in 1968 on grounds that he gave false and misleading information when he applied for landed immigrant status. An appeal against the deportation order was eventually considered by the Supreme Court of Canada in 1974, which, in a precedent-setting case, determined that the person did not have to knowingly present false or misleading information to be deportable.

During the 1970s, Taylor acted for David Duke, the Ku Klux Klan member, when he was removed from Canada. Among the other clients he acted for was Robert Satiacum, a U.S. native tribal leader, who was the first U.S. citizen to be found a Convention refugee in Canada, a decision later reversed by the Federal Court of Appeal in 1989.

== Personal ==
Taylor was an uncle of Mark Taylor, a professional ice hockey player in the 1980s, the son of his older brother.

Taylor died in hospital on February 28, 2002, after a short illness. He was survived by his wife Kathleen (Kay), whom he married during World War II, an adult daughter and son, three grandchildren, a brother and a sister.
