= Gerry McGeer =

Canadian politician (1888–1947)

The Honourable Gerald McGeer
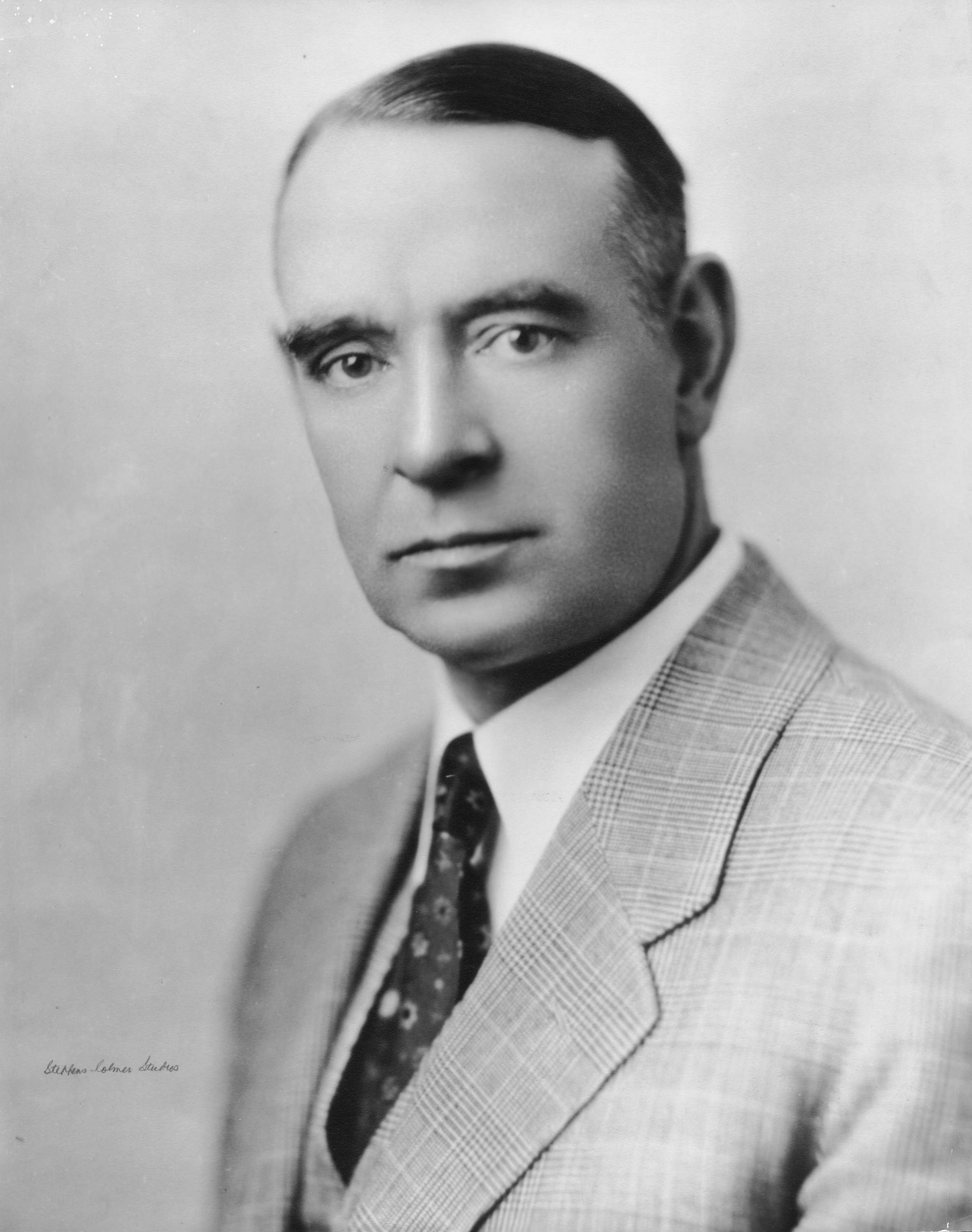
- McGeer in 1935

Member of Parliament for Vancouver—Burrard
- In office February 6, 1936 – April 16, 1945
- Preceded by: Wilfred Hanbury
- Succeeded by: Charles Merritt

22nd Mayor of Vancouver
- In office 1947–1947
- Preceded by: Jonathan W.Cornett
- Succeeded by: Charles E. Jones
- In office 1935–1936
- Preceded by: L. D. Taylor
- Succeeded by: George C. Miller

Member of the Legislative Assembly of British Columbia
- In office February 20, 1934 – October 1, 1935
- Preceded by: District established
- Succeeded by: John Howard Forester
- Constituency: Vancouver-Burrard
- In office March 1, 1917 – October 23, 1920
- Preceded by: Francis Lovett Carter-Cotton
- Succeeded by: Thomas Pearson
- Constituency: Richmond

Personal details
- Born: Gerald Grattan McGeer; 6 January 1888 Winnipeg, Manitoba, Canada
- Died: 11 August 1947 (aged 59) Vancouver, British Columbia, Canada
- Party: Liberal Party of Canada
- Other political affiliations: Liberal Party of BC
- Spouse: Charlotte Spencer
- Education: Dalhousie University

Gerald Grattan McGeer (6 January 1888 – 11 August 1947) was a lawyer, populist politician, and monetary reform advocate in the Canadian province of British Columbia. He served as the 22nd Mayor of Vancouver, a Member of the Legislative Assembly in BC, Member of Parliament for the Liberal Party of Canada, and in the Canadian Senate.

== Early life ==
Born in Winnipeg, Manitoba, to James McGeer and his wife Emily Cooke, McGeer moved with his family as a young child to Vancouver. He grew up in the Mount Pleasant neighbourhood. As a young adult, he worked in an iron foundry and was an active member in his union. Eventually he went to Dalhousie University to study law. Back in Vancouver, he married Charlotte Spencer, of the department store family.

== Freight rate fight ==
McGeer first attained renown in the 1920s as a lawyer representing the British Columbia government in its case to reduce freight rate differentials on goods shipped through the Rocky Mountains by rail. He worked for years on this case and achieved considerable success. The outcome proved a windfall for the BC economy, earning McGeer a reputation as "the man who flattened the Rockies." Reductions in discriminatory freight rates made it economically feasible for prairie grain to come west and be exported through Vancouver's port rather than seaports in eastern Canada and the United States.

== MLA ==
McGeer was elected to the British Columbia Legislature as the Liberal candidate for Richmond from 1916 to 1920, and later as part of the Liberal government of Duff Pattullo for Vancouver-Burrard from 1933 to 1935. McGeer was considered a maverick in his own party during his second term, after he became critical of the government because Pattullo had not appointed him to cabinet. According to McGeer, Pattullo had led him to believe he would become the province's Attorney-General.

== Mayor Gerry ==
McGeer's most indelible mark in BC was made during his time as Mayor of Vancouver. He won the 1934 election against incumbent L. D. Taylor with the biggest margin of victory in Vancouver's civic history. He established himself in his campaign as a populist reformer, painting his opponent as outdated and corrupt, with police and monetary reform the two main pillars of his campaign. As mayor, he would not have power to implement his monetary policies, which he believed could end the depression. He was, however, able to reform the police department and the civic government, but it was his battles against communism that garnered him the most publicity, at least in his first year in office. Unemployed men in the federal relief camps had been organized by Communist agitators into the Relief Camp Workers' Union. They struck on 4 April 1935 and arrived in Vancouver on boxcars shortly thereafter. The men stayed in Vancouver for two months, marching daily in protest of relief camp conditions.

On one occasion, they entered the Hudson's Bay Company Department Store to publicize their grievances to shoppers. The police came to evict the men, and a bloody clash ensued. After that incident, the unemployed congregated at Victory Square Park, where McGeer came and read the Riot Act. The camp strikers left the city after two months to begin the On-to-Ottawa Trek. They felt they accomplished all they could in Vancouver and voted to take their grievances directly to Prime Minister R. B. Bennett. Shortly before the trekkers left, another Communist-led strike broke out on the waterfront, culminating with another bloody clash that became known as the Battle of Ballantyne Pier. Gerry McGeer treated these protests not as strikes, but as an attempted Bolshevik uprising. Although he came from a background as an iron molder and union representative, he came to be seen as an enemy of organized labour because of these events.

McGeer organized elaborate celebrations to mark Vancouver's golden jubilee in 1936, which was controversial in the midst of the depression. While some applauded his efforts to boost civic pride as a positive step towards bringing back prosperity, others denounced extravagances such as a $35,000 fountain for Stanley Park's Lost Lagoon while the city teetered on the edge of bankruptcy. McGeer is also credited with the construction of Vancouver City Hall, a landmark Art Deco building funded in part by a baby bond scheme conceived by McGeer.

== Monetary reform ==
In the early part of the Great Depression, McGeer became a zealous student of economics and soon became obsessed with monetary reform as the answer to the economic crisis. He eventually came up with his own theories, which he cobbled together from the work of John Maynard Keynes, Abraham Lincoln, and the Bible. (Williams, 312) On one occasion, he hypothesized that international "money power" was financing Communists activities in Vancouver. Another time he testified before the government that Abraham Lincoln was assassinated by international bankers opposed to the introduction of "Greenbacks." McGeer's lifelong mission was to attain a position where he could implement his reform ideas, but his flamboyant, aggressive, and eccentric style and theories alienated the powerbrokers in his own party.

== Federal politics ==
While still mayor, McGeer ran as a Liberal Party candidate in the 1935 federal election and won in the riding of Vancouver—Burrard by a thin margin. In previous attempts, McGeer suffered defeats in the federal elections of 1925, 1926, and 1930. He was re-elected in 1940 and appointed to the Senate by Prime Minister Mackenzie King on 9 June 1945.

Although he attained his goal of becoming elected to the federal government, McGeer was once again relegated to the back benches of Mackenzie King's government. He had a warm relationship with King through much of his political career, but King did not embrace McGeer's monetary schemes but eventually saw things his way. Despite the reservations of the political elite, McGeer was immensely popular outside those circles because of his fiery oration skills. His tirades against bankers and the banking system proved especially popular during the Great Depression, and he regularly lectured to packed houses across the country.

== Civic comeback ==
McGeer returned to civic politics with another landslide election victory in 1946, this time on a Non-Partisan Association slate. Again he ran on a campaign to rid the city of vice and police corruption. Ill-health made him less exuberant than his earlier mayoral term, but he nonetheless persisted with his reforms. Twenty-six men on the police force were demoted or dismissed and the chief constable was replaced by Walter Mulligan, who was the youngest chief in Vancouver to date. McGeer died in office in 1947 and therefore did not see the fruits of his latest reform drive. In 1955, revelations surfaced that McGeer's chosen police chief had instituted a pay-off system in Vancouver, resulting in an extensive police inquiry. Mulligan fled the country, one high-ranking member of the force committed suicide, and another attempted suicide. Meanwhile, a Superintendent from the Royal Canadian Mounted Police took over as the new chief.

== Legacy ==
McGeer's monetary reform ideas were considered one of his biggest passions. He strongly advocated for government intervention against the British monetary system, and in nationalizing the Bank of Canada.

McGeer's economic ideas are more fully elaborated in his 1935 book, "The Conquest of Poverty".

== See also ==
- Monetary reform
- Money creation
