= Vancouver Club =

Private club in Vancouver, British Columbia

- Formation: 27 May 1891; 135 years ago
- Type: Private club
- Headquarters: 915 W Hastings Street
- Website: vancouverclub.ca

The Vancouver Club is a private social club in Vancouver, British Columbia. The club was founded in 1891 as a gentlemen's club but in 1993 became mixed-sex. Since its inception it has been the city's preeminent private club. For most of its history, the club's membership was restricted to the city's old money, in contrast with the Terminal City Club, which was more open in its membership policies. As with many traditional gentlemen's clubs, the Vancouver Club struggled to attract younger members after the 1960s. Besides becoming mixed-sex, in recent decades the club has abandoned most of its Victorian customs and has become a more informal, business oriented institution.

The club has occupied its present quarters since 1914. The clubhouse, designed by Sharp & Thompson, sits on a prominent lot on Hastings Street in the heart of the city's financial district, and is now a designated heritage building.

== History ==
=== Early years and first clubhouse, 1890–1913 ===
The origin of the Vancouver Club lay in 1890, when, four years after the city's founding, a group of Vancouverites decided the city needed a proper gentlemen's club. This was in part motivated by the fact that Victoria had a club – the Union Club of British Columbia – while Vancouver lacked such an institution. As such, Vancouver was devoid of decent quarters to entertain officers from the Royal Navy. In May of that year, Campbell Sweeny approached W. J. Meakin, the owner of the Lefevre Block at the corner of Seymour and Hastings, and requested if the group might use his facilities. Meakin agree and the club began meeting there, but on 12 July, Meakin evicted them.

Shortly thereafter, the group formed a committee to investigate the purchase of land on which to build a clubhouse. The committee consisted of F. Carter Cotton, J. C. Keith, R. G. Tatlow, and Dr J. Whetham. The group decided on a piece of land on Hastings Street at the end of Hornby Street, that was owned by the Canadian Pacific Railway. The committee wrote CPR president William Cornelius Van Horne with their proposal to purchase a lot, and suggested a price of $50 per front foot. On 24 December 1890, Van Horne wrote to Vancouver's land commissioner, J. M. Browning (who would become the club's first president), and relayed a proposal to sell the land for $100 per front foot.

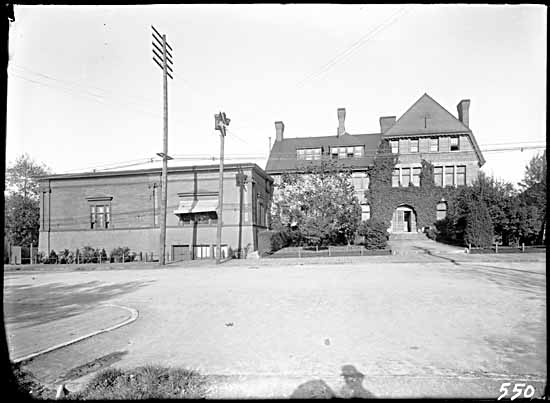
The first clubhouse, used from 1894 to 1913. The 1903 ballroom is seen at left.

On 7 April 1891, supporters of the proposed club met at the Hotel Vancouver. They agreed to form a corporation, the Vancouver Club Company Limited, which would be capitalised at $50,000 in 50 shares. On 27 May the group drew up a certificate of incorporation, thus bringing the club into existence as a legal entity, and filed the certificate on 17 June. On 19 June the group met again and passed a resolution to appoint Charles Osborne Wickenden (1851–1934) to design a clubhouse. The corporation met in September to elect a board. The first directors of the club were J. C. Keith, David Oppenheimer, H. Bell-Irving, E. Mahon, and E. E. Rand. Construction on the clubhouse began in early 1892. By the fall of that year the building was nearly complete, however, the club had gone into debt and was unable to furnish the clubhouse. Consequently, a new holding company called the Granville Club Company Limited was formed to manage the club's assets and raise capital to complete the project. The company was incorporated on 8 March 1894. The sale of the land to the Granville Club was finalised on 5 April 1894, when the club acquired 100 feet for $12,500.

The club opened sometime in the spring of 1894. In the basement of the clubhouse there was a billiards room with two Burroughes & Watts tables and bowling alley; on the main floor there was a reception room, wine room, and reading room; the second floor had two card rooms, the main dining room, and the private dining room; and on the third floor were the bedroom for staff and members. The dining room on the second floor exited to a balcony that provided view of Burrard Inlet. The first ballot of new members took place on 10 March 1894, when 74 candidates were elected to the club. Over the next year, an additional 59 members were elected. On 10 August of that year, the club hosted its first ball. From that time on, the club hosted two balls annually: one the first week of July and the other on New Year's Eve. The balls became staples of the Vancouver social calendar and also served as venues for the city's élite families to debut their daughters. In 1903 the club underwent expansion when it constructed a ballroom and a pavilion. To accommodate the expansion, the club purchased an addition 50 feet of land from the CPR at a price of $100 per front foot. This brought the club's land holdings to 177 feet.

==== Construction of the new clubhouse, 1910–1913 ====
By the time of the club's annual meeting in March 1910, the number of resident members had reached 349, while the club's constitution limited membership at 350. President Charles Hibbert Tupper, the son of one of Canada's Fathers of Confederation, appointed a special committee to investigate the expansion of the clubhouse. The committee drew up a plan for a $12,000 expansion and presented this to the membership on 23 June. However, the proposal was voted down with no alternative put forward. On 9 December 1910 another extraordinary meeting was called where the committee put forth a second proposal. This time, the committee proposed the construction of a new clubhouse, increased entrance fees, an assessment on all members, and the increase of membership from 350 to 500. The members met again on 11 January 1911 where the committee put forth two proposals for a new clubhouse. In the first, the club would remain in its current location but sell part of the land. In the second, it would purchase 125 feet of land on the southwest corner of Hornby and Georgia for $125,000 and built a new clubhouse there. On 7 March, members voted 100–35 in favour of selling the current property and moving to Georgia Street. However, at the annual meeting the next day, a petition signed by 44 members was submitted to reconsider the decision from the previous day. On 30 March a second vote was cast, and the membership voted 102–96 in favour of remaining at the current location.

A new committee was struck in December 1911 to oversee the construction of the clubhouse. Elected to it were F. J. Proctor, E. P. Davis, W. F. Salisbury, R. Marpole, W. A. Macdonald, Frederick Buscombe, and George H. Hall. In April 1912, plans for the clubhouse prepared by architects Sharp & Thompson were approved, and the current property was sold for $200,000. By October the club contracted Norton Griffiths Steel Construction Company Limited to build the new clubhouse, and arranged a five-year $150,000 loan from the New York Life Insurance Company at six percent interest. Construction took place through 1913 and the building was complete by that fall. Equipment and furnishing were installed in November and December.

=== The second clubhouse, 1914–present ===
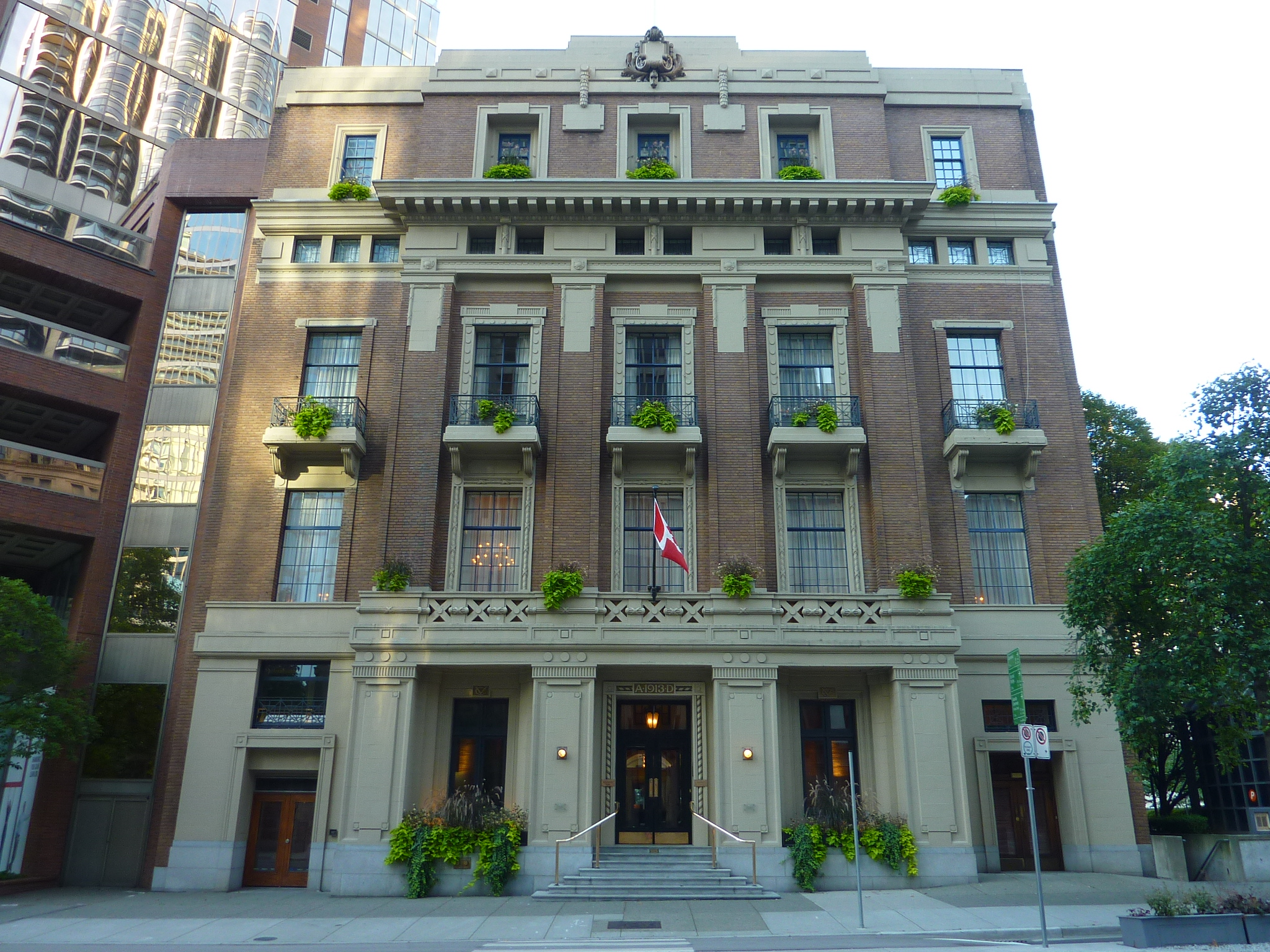
The second clubhouse, designed by Sharp & Thompson. The doors opened on 1 January 1914.

On New Year's Eve of 1913, a group of members gathered in the old clubhouse for a farewell banquet. When the clock struck midnight, the group gathered in the hall behind club president E. P. Davis and paraded to the new quarters. After the completion of the new clubhouse, the old premises were rented from 1914–1918 to the Seaforth Highlanders of Canada, from 1918–1925 to the Great War Veterans Association, and from 1925–1930 to the Quadra Club. On 6 January 1930, demolition of the old clubhouse began and was completed the following month. The lot remains vacant to this day.

In British Columbia, prohibition came into effect on 1 October 1917. On 28 September of that year, the club held the first of a series of "subscription dinners" to mark the occasion. The second such dinner was held on 22 May 1919 in honour of Major-General John William Stewart. Only four months later, Major-General R. G. E. Leckie arranged a dinner at the club for the Prince of Wales, later King Edward VIII, during the latter's tour of Canada. On 22 September 1919, the Prince dined at the club in a member's only dinner. In October 1919 a dinner was held for General Sir Arthur Currie, and in November for Admiral of the Fleet Viscount Jellicoe. Beginning in the 1920s, all governors general were given dinners at the club.

At the end of 1928, the Granville Club Company was dissolved and its assets transferred to the new Vancouver Club Society.

Until the 1970s, the club's members were almost exclusively of English origin and members of the Anglican Church of Canada. As the city's demographics changed and non Anglo-Saxons gained prominence in business, the club loosened gradually its unofficial policy only to admit Anglo Protestants. In 1970, the Hungarian-born Dennis Molnar was admitted. Shortly thereafter, three Chinese – Dr Chan Gunn, Robert H. Lee, and Tong Louie – became members. Louie's sponsor was Lt-Col Charles Merritt VC, whose status ensured there would be no objection. Although two of the club's founders, David and Isaac Oppenheimer, were Jewish, the club had in effect excluded Jews from the time it opened. In 1977 the club allowed its first Jewish member, Chief Justice Nathaniel Nemetz, who was sponsored by John Lauchlan Farris and Walter Stewart Owen.

Despite its liberalised membership policies, in the wake of the 1960s the club struggled to attract new members. The elite from the younger baby boomer generation, which celebrated health and wellness, preferred athletic clubs over dining clubs. Peter Newman explained that "it is at the Lawn Tennis & Badminton Club that the second-generation Vancouver Establishment prefers to spend its time." Businessman Peter M. Brown, who had five relatives in the club but declined a membership himself, relayed, "the Vancouver Club was once at the center of the action, but the new doers aren't joining it. The last thing I can imagine would be going to the Vancouver Club, taking a bottle of Scotch out of my little locker and sitting for the afternoon at a wooden table on a wooden chair." In 1998, Newman said, "the Vancouver Club is a good example of how these once-sacrosanct institutions have faded into insignificance."

In 1986, the Vancouver Club absorbed the University Club of Vancouver, another historic gentlemen's club. The University Club had been founded in 1911, folded in the 1930s, and then reopened in 1955. In 2000 the club absorbed the Georgian Club, a ladies' club that had been founded in 1910. After absorbing the club, the Financial Post reported plans by the Georgians to replace cigar nights with dance lessons.

== Presidents ==
- 1893-94 – J. M. Browning
- 1895-96 – Issac Oppenheimer
- 1897 – J. C. Keith
- 1898-1901 – H. Abbott
- 1902-04 – D. Bell-Irving
- 1905 – H. Lockwood
- 1906 – E. Mahon
- 1907-08 – F. M. Chaldecott
- 1909 – Sir Charles Hibbert Tupper KCMG KC
- 1908-10 – J. G. Woods
- 1911-12 – W. F. Salisbury
- 1913-14 – E. P. Davis KC
- 1915-16 – F. W. Peters
- 1917-18 – G. S. Harrison
- 1919 – A. H. MacNeill KC
- 1920 – J. A. Macdonald MD
- 1921 – F. W. Rounsefell
- 1922 – W. J. Blake Wilson
- 1923 – J. H. Senkler
- 1924 – F. W Tiffin
- 1925 – H. St John Montizambert
- 1926 – George Kidd
- 1927 – J. Frye Smith
- 1928-29 – R. Kerr Houlgate
- 1930-31 – J. E. McMullen KC
- 1932-33 – K. J. Burns
- 1934-35 – W. G. Murrin
- 1936 – J. K. Macrae KC
- 1937 – William Culham Woodward
- 1938-39 – William Alexander Macdonald
- 1940 – E. H. Adams
- 1941 – E. A. Cleveland
- 1942 – F. J. Burd
- 1943 – C. A. Cotterell
- 1944 – J. F. Belyea
- 1945 – R. D. Williams
- 1946 – H. A. Stevenson
- 1947 – J. Y. McCarter
- 1948-49 – W. S. Owen KC
- 1950-51 – A. H. Williamson
- 1952-53 – R. B. Buckerfield
- 1954-55 – Ralph D. Baker
- 1956 – L. F. Stevenson
- 1957-58 – W. Manson
- 1959-60 – George O. Vale
- 1961-62 – Air Cdre Alan Duncan Bell-Irving MC
- 1963-64 – D. R. Blair
- 1965 – T. E. Ladner QC
- 1966 – R. M. Hungerford
- 1967 – R. R. Keay FCA
- 1968 – Alan M. Robertson
- 1969 – J. Douglas Maitland
- 1970 – P. R. Brissenden QC
- 1971 – H. M. Gale

== Club histories ==
- Paul L. Bissley. The History of the Vancouver Club. Vancouver Club, 1971.
- Reginald H. Roy. The Vancouver Club: The First Century, 1889-1989. Vancouver Club, 1989. ISBN 9780889259218

== See also ==
- List of gentlemen's clubs in Canada
