= Harold James Merilees =

Canadian politician (1908-1972)

Harold James Merilees (January 5, 1908 – September 19, 1972) was an advertising executive and political figure in British Columbia. He represented Vancouver-Burrard in the Legislative Assembly of British Columbia from 1969 to 1972 as a Social Credit member.

Born in Vancouver, Merilees worked in advertising and public relations for David Spencer Ltd. In 1931, he became manager of the Public Information department for the B.C. Electric Railway Company. From 1941 to 1945, he ran the war savings campaign for the National War Finance Committee of Vancouver. Merilees was associated with the promotion of Vancouver's Diamond Jubilee in 1946, the 1954 British Empire Games, the 1958 B.C. Centennial celebrations and the United Red Feather Appeal. He was president and general manager of the Vancouver Tourist Bureau from 1960 to 1968. Merilees founded the Vancouver Sea Festival in 1962. He died in Vancouver at the age of 64.

Tourism Vancouver presents the Harold J. Merilees Memorial Award to honour outstanding contributions to awareness of the Greater Vancouver area.
