= Charles Merritt =

Canadian politician

Charles Cecil Ingersoll Merritt VC ED
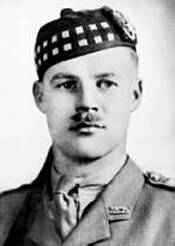
- Photo of Charles Merritt from The Times

Member of the Canadian Parliament for Vancouver—Burrard
- In office 1945–1949
- Preceded by: Gerry McGeer
- Succeeded by: Lorne MacDougall

Personal details
- Born: 10 November 1908 Vancouver, British Columbia, Canada
- Died: 12 July 2000 (aged 91) Vancouver, British Columbia, Canada
- Party: Progressive Conservative
- Awards: Victoria Cross; Mentioned in Despatches; Efficiency Decoration

Military service
- Allegiance: Canada
- Branch/service: Canadian Army
- Years of service: 1929–1945
- Rank: Lieutenant Colonel
- Commands: The South Saskatchewan Regiment
- Battles/wars: World War II

Charles Cecil Ingersoll Merritt VC, ED (10 November 1908 – 12 July 2000) was a Canadian recipient of the Victoria Cross for his actions during the Dieppe Raid in 1942. Later he served as Member of Parliament.

== Early life ==
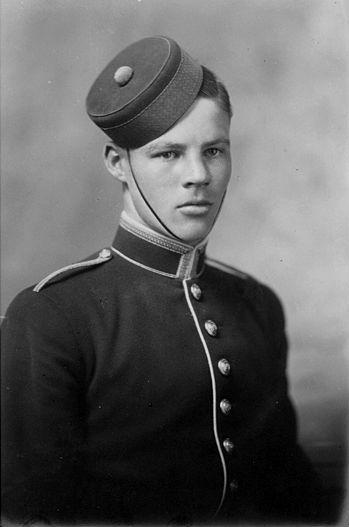
Cecil Merritt, Royal Military College of Canada cadet

Merritt was born in Vancouver, British Columbia on 10 November 1908, the son of Captain Cecil Mack Merritt, who was killed in the Second Battle of Ypres, on 23 April 1915. He entered the Royal Military College of Canada, H1866 in 1925 at the age of 16 and graduated with honours.

== Career ==
He was commissioned into the Seaforth Highlanders of Canada (a Militia regiment) in 1929. Merritt read for the Bar and became a barrister in 1932. He practised law in Vancouver until mobilized at the outbreak of World War II.

== Military service ==
Merritt served as an officer in the Seaforth Highlanders of Canada. At the outbreak of war, Merritt was promoted to the rank of major and in December sailed for England. In the next two years he held a variety of staff and regimental appointments and attended the War Staff Course at Camberley in June 1941.

From GSO2 of the 3rd Canadian Division, in March 1942, he was promoted to command The South Saskatchewan Regiment, Canadian Army, (Canadian Infantry Corps). Two months later, they moved to the Isle of Wight to train for the Dieppe raid.

Merritt led his regiment in the Dieppe raid on 19 August 1942. Before being taken as a prisoner of war, Merritt was wounded twice. For his extreme bravery and inspirational leadership under fire, Merritt was awarded the Victoria Cross.

Two experienced British Commando units (Numbers 3 and 4) were assigned to land before dawn to destroy German heavy gun batteries on promontories east and west of the port, a task in which they were largely successful. Two Canadian battalions were scheduled to land at the same time to the immediate east and west of Dieppe to give landward support to the attacks on the guns and to form a secure perimeter for the main force to land.

The right flank Canadian battalion assigned to Green Beach was the South Saskatchewan Regiment commanded by Merritt. His objectives were Pourville, west of the port, then the cliffs above the village.

His force crossed the Channel in Royal Navy destroyers, transferred to landing craft 10 miles offshore and reached Green Beach on time, in near darkness and unopposed. But the main part of the battalion was landed on the wrong side of the River Scie estuary and faced crossing a narrow bridge through Pourville in order to approach their objectives on the cliffs.

By then alert to the situation, the German defenders targeted the bridge with machine-gun and mortar fire. Initial Canadian attempts to storm the bridge failed and left it covered with dead and wounded. Merritt led the next rush forward, waving his steel helmet with the rallying shout, "Come on over. There's nothing to it!"

His audacity took the enemy by surprise. Some Canadians followed him over the bridge, and others used the girders to cross. Merritt soon had most of his surviving men on the far bank, but shortage of mortar ammunition and lack of communications to the destroyers to call for supporting fire made any further advance impossible.

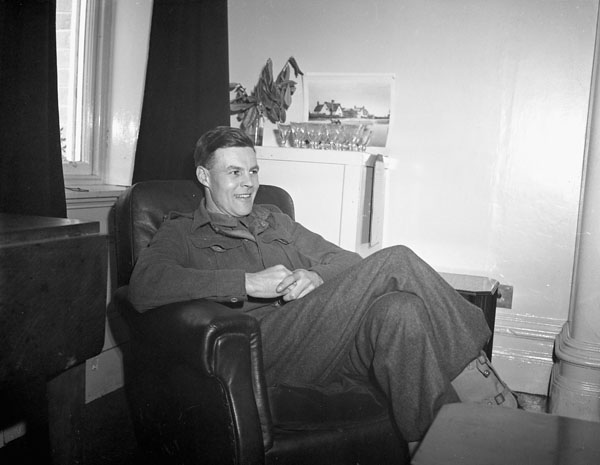
LCol Cecil Merritt, VC, South Saskatchewan Regiment, captured at Dieppe, upon his return to England, April 1945

Meanwhile, the company that had landed on the west bank of the Scie had reached its objective and had sent a success signal to the operation command ship. This and one from Lord Lovat's Number 4 Commando were the only two success signals sent in the entire operation.

Finding concrete pillboxes blocking movement towards his objectives, Merritt led an attack on each in turn, personally killing the occupants of one by throwing grenades through the enemy's firing ports. When the last enemy strongpoint had been silenced, Merritt had been twice wounded and his battalion reduced to fewer than 300 men.

He led his small force in holding on to an improvised perimeter and kept contact with his section positions by moving from one to another after his runners were killed. When the time came to move back to the beach, Merritt coolly gave instructions for an orderly withdrawal and announced his intention to hold off the enemy from a rearguard position in a small bandstand near the beach to cover the unit's re-embarkation. The South Saskatchewan battalion left 84 dead on Green Beach, and 89 more, including Merritt and eight other officers, were taken prisoner.

His citation for award of the Victoria Cross concluded: "To this commanding officer's personal daring the success of his unit's operations and the safe re-embarkation of a large portion of it were chiefly due."

Merritt was sent to prison camp Oflag VII-B at Eichstätt in Bavaria. Together with 64 others, he escaped through a 120 ft tunnel during the night of 3–4 June 1943. All were recaptured after a massive manhunt. Merritt was sentenced to 14 days' solitary confinement before being transferred to Oflag IV-C at Colditz Castle. He remarked after being freed: "My war lasted six hours. There are plenty of Canadians who went all the way from the landings in Sicily to the very end." He was dismissive of his time as a prisoner of war with the words: "It was an enforced idleness. It cannot be translated into virtue."

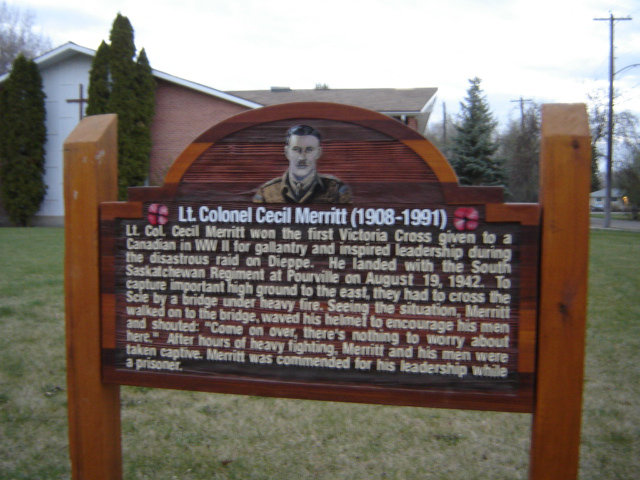
Lt. Col Cecil Merritt plaque at the corner of Merritt St. & Rockingham Ave. in Saskatoon's Montgomery Place neighborhood.

In recognition of Merritt being the Commanding Officer of The South Saskatchewan Regiment during Operation Jubilee, four streets in the Rosemont neighbourhood of Regina were named in his honour. Charles Crescent, Cecil Crescent, Ingersoll Crescent, and Merritt Crescent.

Merritt is also remembered by a road called Merritt Drive in the City of Windsor, Ontario - the city which provided the Essex Scottish Regiment, which assaulted 'Red Beach', Dieppe, at same time as the South Saskatchewans were assaulting 'Green Beach' It is next to Tilston Drive, which refers to Major Fred Tilston VC, of the Essex Scottish Regiment who received his VC in Germany in 1945.

== Postwar ==
After taking his release from military service in 1945, Merritt served as a Member of Parliament, being elected to the House of Commons of Canada, serving the electoral district of Vancouver—Burrard from 1945 to 1949.

Returning from Ottawa, he resumed his law practice in Vancouver and served as Commanding Officer of the Seaforth Highlanders of Canada from 1951 to 1954; he later was Honorary Lieutenant Colonel of the regiment from 1963 to 1966.

Merritt served on the board of directors of Mount Pleasant War Memorial Community Cooperative Association from 1950 to 1994.

He became a valued rugby player for the Meraloma Rugby Club. Brother officers spoke with awe of his skill at the informal hockey game shinny.

== Family ==
In 1937, he married Grace Graham, the daughter of Jamieson Bone of Belleville, Ontario; they had two sons and a daughter.

== Death and burial ==
LCol Merritt died at the age of 91 in Vancouver on 12 July 2000.

He was buried at Ocean View Cemetery, 4000 Imperial Street, Burnaby, British Columbia, Canada in the Royal Section, Plot 49, Grave #5.

== Medals ==
The LCol Merritt, V.C., medal set, which consists of the Victoria Cross, the 1939–45 Star, the Defence Medal, the Canadian Volunteer Service Medal with Overseas and Dieppe clasps, the British War Medal 1939–45 with Mentioned in Despatches (MID), the Queen Elizabeth II Coronation Medal 1953, the Canadian Centennial Medal 1967, the Queen Elizabeth II Silver Jubilee Medal 1977, the Canada 125th Anniversary Medal and the Efficiency Decoration with Canada Bar, was donated to the Canadian War Museum, Ottawa, some time after his death on 12 July 2000.

== Legacy ==
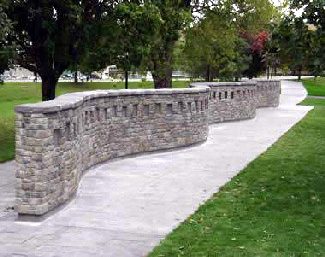
Wall of Honour, Royal Military College of Canada

Merritt, a graduate of the Royal Military College of Canada, is listed on the Wall of Honour in Kingston, Ontario.

Four streets in the City of Regina, the capital of Saskatchewan, are named in honour of Merritt. Charles Crescent, Cecil Crescent, Ingersoll Crescent, and Merritt Crescent.

The bridge over the River Scie in Pourville, where Merrit earned the VC, was renamed in his honour for the 50th anniversary of the raid in 1992.

In 2017, the First Year Flight of Montcalm Squadron was renamed from Savage Flight to Merritt Flight, in honour of this most distinguished graduate.
