= Mackenzie Valley Pipeline =

Proposed natural gas project in Canada

Location
- Country: Canada
- Direction: north–south
- Start: Mackenzie Valley
- Passes through: Fort Simpson, Northwest Territories
- To: Alberta

General information
- Type: natural gas
- Partners: Imperial Oil, The Aboriginal Pipeline Group, ConocoPhillips, Shell Canada, ExxonMobil
- Construction started: 2010
- Expected: 2014

Technical information
- Length: 758 mi (1,220 km)
- Maximum discharge: 18.5 billion cubic meters per year

The Mackenzie Valley Pipeline, also called the Mackenzie River Pipeline, was a proposed project to transport natural gas from the Beaufort Sea through Canada's Northwest Territories to tie into gas pipelines in northern Alberta. The project was first proposed in the early 1970s but was scrapped following an inquiry conducted by Justice Thomas Berger. The project was resurrected in 2004 with a new proposal to transport gas through the sensitive arctic tundra. Probabilistic estimates of hydrocarbons in the Mackenzie Delta and Beaufort Sea regions project that there are natural gas reserves of 1.9 trillion cubic metres (67×10^{12} cu ft). After many delays, the project was officially abandoned in 2017 by the main investment partners citing natural gas prices and the long regulatory process.

== History ==
The prospect of a pipeline bringing the natural gas to North American energy markets was originally analyzed in the 1970s with the Mackenzie Valley Pipeline Inquiry. During that inquiry, Justice Berger heard testimony from diverse groups with an interest in the pipeline. The inquiry was notable for the voice it gave to the First Peoples whose traditional territory the pipeline would traverse. Berger stated that a pipeline should be postponed for 10 years, estimating that it would take this long for land claims to be settled and for First Peoples to be ready for the impact of such a project. Before the Trudeau government could act on Berger's report, it was defeated at the polls in 1979. The short-lived government of Joe Clark also failed to act on the report. When the Liberal government was re-elected in 1980, it approved construction of an oil pipeline from Norman Wells to Zama, Alberta, through Dehcho territory where land claims have yet to be settled.

Exploration continued at a steady pace and by 1995 there were over 1,900 wells above the 60th parallel. In addition, aboriginal groups settled numerous land claims. The Inuvialuit settled the first land claim in 1984, followed by the Sahtu and Gwichʼin. By the late 1990s, companies once again seriously considered a pipeline. The Canadian government sold mineral claim rights, leading to C$400 million in bids and over C$1 billion in work commitments.

With the first wave of land claims settled, negotiations began between oil and gas companies and local aboriginal groups. These negotiations proved successful in October 2001, when ConocoPhillips, Shell, ExxonMobil, and Imperial Oil signed a Memorandum of Understanding with the Aboriginal Pipeline Group. The APG was formed to represent the Inuvialuit, Sahtu, and Gwichʼin. The Memorandum of Understanding offered the APG a financial stake in the pipeline.

On June 19, 2003, the Aboriginal Pipeline Group, and TransCanada Corp. signed an agreement giving the aboriginal groups of the Northwest Territories one-third ownership of the pipeline project.

On 11 March 2011, the Mackenzie Valley pipeline was granted federal cabinet approval. The National Energy Board granted a Certificate of Public Convenience and Necessity.

By 2016, the projected cost of the pipeline had grown to almost $16 billion. Despite the fact that a consortium of companies had permits that allowed them to build until 2022, due to a combination of factors such as the growing extraction of cheaper natural gas sources in North America and the regulatory approval far outpacing the expected timeline, the joint-venture partnership led by Imperial Oil announced the abandonment of the project in 2017.

== Technical description ==
The capacity of the pipeline is predicted to be 18.5 billion cubic metres per annum (650×10^{9} cu ft/a). It will be 758 miles (1,220 km) long and the cost of the project is estimated at C$16.2 billion. As of mid-March 2007, revised cost and schedule information included C$3.5 billion for the gas-gathering system, C$7.8 billion for the pipeline, and C$4.9 billion to other economic growth projects planned for three gas field sites in the Mackenzie River delta. 2010, and also 2014 at the earliest, are current production and start-up milestones published for printed newsletters and on-line webpage articles of the pipeline project.

== Route ==
The pipeline would go south through the Mackenzie Valley to Fort Simpson and then continue south to Alberta. Once in Alberta, the pipeline would feed into the existing pipeline infrastructure.

== Pipeline consortium ==
The pipeline consortium consists of Imperial Oil (34.4%), The Aboriginal Pipeline Group (33.3%), ConocoPhillips Canada (North) Limited (15.7%), Shell Canada Limited (11.4%) and ExxonMobil Canada Properties (5.2%). A notable feature of the current proposal is the participation of First Nations through the Aboriginal Pipeline Group. The APG has the opportunity to acquire a one third interest in the pipeline. Four oil companies: Imperial Oil of Canada, ConocoPhillips Canada (North) Limited, Shell Canada Limited and ExxonMobil Canada Properties, hold the interest in the oil fields, a gathering plant at Inuvik, a liquids pipeline from the facility near Inuvik, to Norman Wells and a two-thirds interest in the pipeline.

TransCanada Corp. does not have a direct stake in the project but is earning a share in the line through financial support for the Aboriginal Pipeline Group. There are speculations that the company was poised to take control of the project.

== Environmental concerns ==
The pipeline project has raised concerns by environmental groups. The Boreal Forest Conservation Framework calls for protection of fifty percent of the 6,000,000 square kilometres (2,300,000 sq mi) of boreal forest (of which the Mackenzie Valley is a part) in Canada's north. Groups such as the World Wildlife Fund of Canada are pointing out that in the Northwest Territories' Mackenzie Valley, only five of the 16 ecoregions that are directly intersected by the proposed major gas pipeline or adjacent hydrocarbon development areas are reasonably represented by protected areas.

The Sierra Club of Canada opposed the pipeline due to its perceived environmental impacts such as fragment intact of boreal forests along the Mackenzie River and damage of habitat for species such as Woodland Caribou and Grizzly bear. Sierra Club also argues that Mackenzie gas is slated to fuel further development of Alberta's Oil sands, which they claim produces the most damaging type of oil for the global atmosphere, through another pipeline to Fort McMurray. The Pembina Institute argues that carbon dioxide from the Mackenzie gas project and the fuel's end use would push Canada's greenhouse gas emissions 10% further away from its Kyoto Protocol commitment.

== Relation to other projects ==
Although some consider the Mackenzie Valley Pipeline to be in competition with the Alaskan Natural Gas Pipeline, the two projects will access different natural gas fields. While the Alaska pipeline will access gas fields in Alaska's North Slope, the Mackenzie Gas Project will provide North America with access to Canadian Arctic gas from the Beaufort Sea and Mackenzie Delta. Construction of the Mackenzie Gas Project will also create a major trunk line through NWT which will make it feasible to tap into additional natural gas fields on the NWT mainland, which are currently stranded. Mackenzie will connect with Alberta's existing and extensive pipeline infrastructure, which will allow distribution across Canada and to most major U.S. markets.

In light of Canadian and U.S. policies aimed at shifting to cleaner fuel sources and reducing reliance on oil imported from overseas, it is anticipated that North American natural gas demand will steadily grow in the future. It is therefore expected that both the Mackenzie Gas Project and the Alaska Gas Pipeline will be required in order to meet continental energy demands.

== Economics ==
When the pipeline project was revived, North American gas prices were high, peaking at $15.38 per million British thermal units ($52.5/MWh) in December 2005, but by the time it had been approved prices had dropped to $4.57 per million British thermal units ($15.6/MWh), as a result of a gas glut in the United States because of increased shale gas production. That puts the economics of the project in doubt.
