= Ron Basford =

Canadian politician

The Honourable Ron Basford PC
- Official 1974 portrait
- Born: Stanley Ronald Basford; April 22, 1932; Winnipeg, Manitoba
- Died: January 31, 2005 (aged 72)

Stanley Ronald Basford PC (April 22, 1932 – January 31, 2005) was a Canadian politician and lawyer who was a long-time cabinet minister in the Liberal government of Pierre Trudeau. Based in British Columbia, he was known as "Mr. Granville Island" for his support of the Granville Island redevelopment project in Vancouver.

Basford was first elected to the House of Commons of Canada in the 1963 Canadian federal election as a member of the Liberal Party of Canada, representing the district of Vancouver Centre. After winning re-election in 1968, he held several cabinet positions over the next decade under Prime Minister Pierre Trudeau, including Minister of National Revenue from 1974 to 1975 and Minister of Justice and Attorney General from 1975 until his retirement from the Cabinet in 1978. He did not seek reelection in the 1979 Canadian federal election and resumed his law career.

== Early life and education ==
Born in Winnipeg, Manitoba Basford moved with his mother to Comox, British Columbia, following the death of his father, where he completed his last three years of high school. He then attended the University of British Columbia, earning a law degree in 1956. Following his period of Articles, he was admitted to the Bar, and practised law for the next six years.

Basford had become interested in politics in his early teenage years and was very active in the Liberal Party while at university. He was nominated as the Liberal candidate in Vancouver—Burrard in March 1962 and contested the election in June of that year, losing by 94 votes.

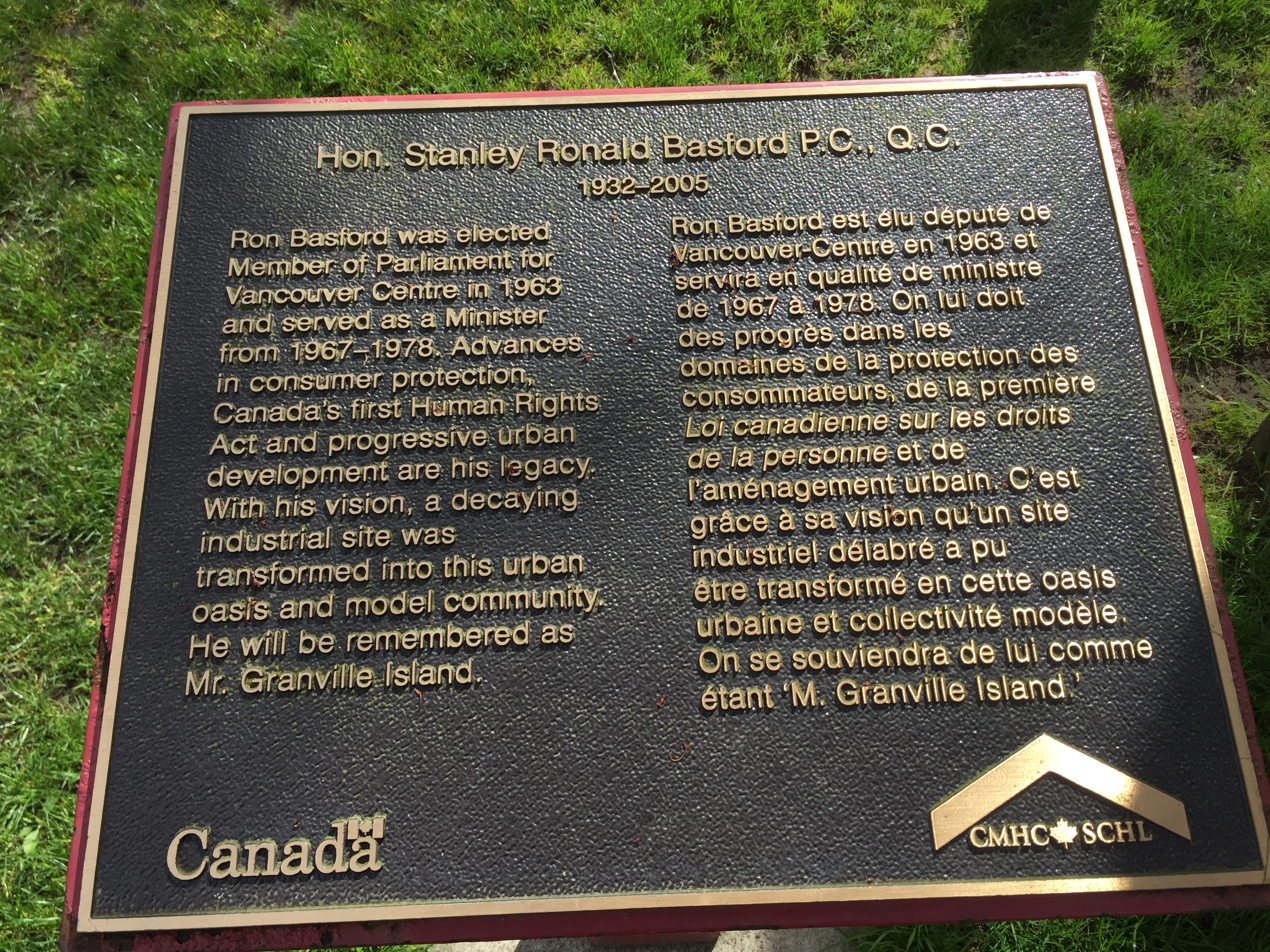
Plaque describing namesake of Ron Basford Park

== Political career ==
Basford was first elected to the House of Commons of Canada as the Liberal member of Parliament for Vancouver—Burrard in the 1963 election and was re-elected in the 1965 election. From 1968 to 1979, he represented the riding of Vancouver Centre.

In 1968, Trudeau brought Basford into Cabinet as Minister of Consumer and Corporate Affairs. He subsequently served as Minister of State for Urban Affairs (1972–1974), Minister of National Revenue (1974–1975), and Minister of Justice and Attorney General of Canada (1975–1978).

As Vancouver's leading cabinet minister, Basford is credited with helping to scuttle plans for an expressway along the city's waterfront that would have levelled the Gastown and Chinatown neighbourhoods, for encouraging local planning and neighbourhood improvement, and for helping win federal support for the construction of thousands of units of co-operative housing in the city.

As Consumer and Corporate Affairs minister, Basford shepherded the passage of legislation that dramatically reduced pharmaceutical prices. This gave Canada the lowest drug prices in the industrialized world into the late 1980s when the legislation was repealed by the Mulroney government. Basford also had passed into law the Hazardous Products Act that eliminated flammable children's bedding and clothing from the market. His most controversial move, at the time, was the adoption of the SI (metric) system as Canada's official standard of weights and measures. This provoked strong opposition from many Canadians but has since been accepted.

During his 30 months as Minister of State for Urban Affairs, Basford led the new Ministry into the uncharted waters of Federal/Provincial/Municipal consultation and cooperation through the development of Tri Level Conferences and working groups, improving the relationships among Canada's three levels of government. At the same time, he sponsored a complete revision of the National Housing Act, which initiated an era of wider programs of social housing and financial aid to municipalities through the Neighbourhood Improvement Program and the Residential Rehabilitation Assistance Program.

As Justice minister, Basford arranged a clemency agreement that kept abortion rights campaigner and practitioner Henry Morgentaler out of jail. He was also Justice minister in 1976 when Canada abolished capital punishment, and when the Canadian Human Rights Act was amended to require equal pay for equal work regardless of gender.

Basford retired from cabinet in 1978, as the longest-serving minister from BC since Confederation, and did not run in the 1979 election. He practised law with the Vancouver law firm of Davis and Company, and was named coordinator by the governments of BC and Canada of the complex Northeast Coal Development in 1982.

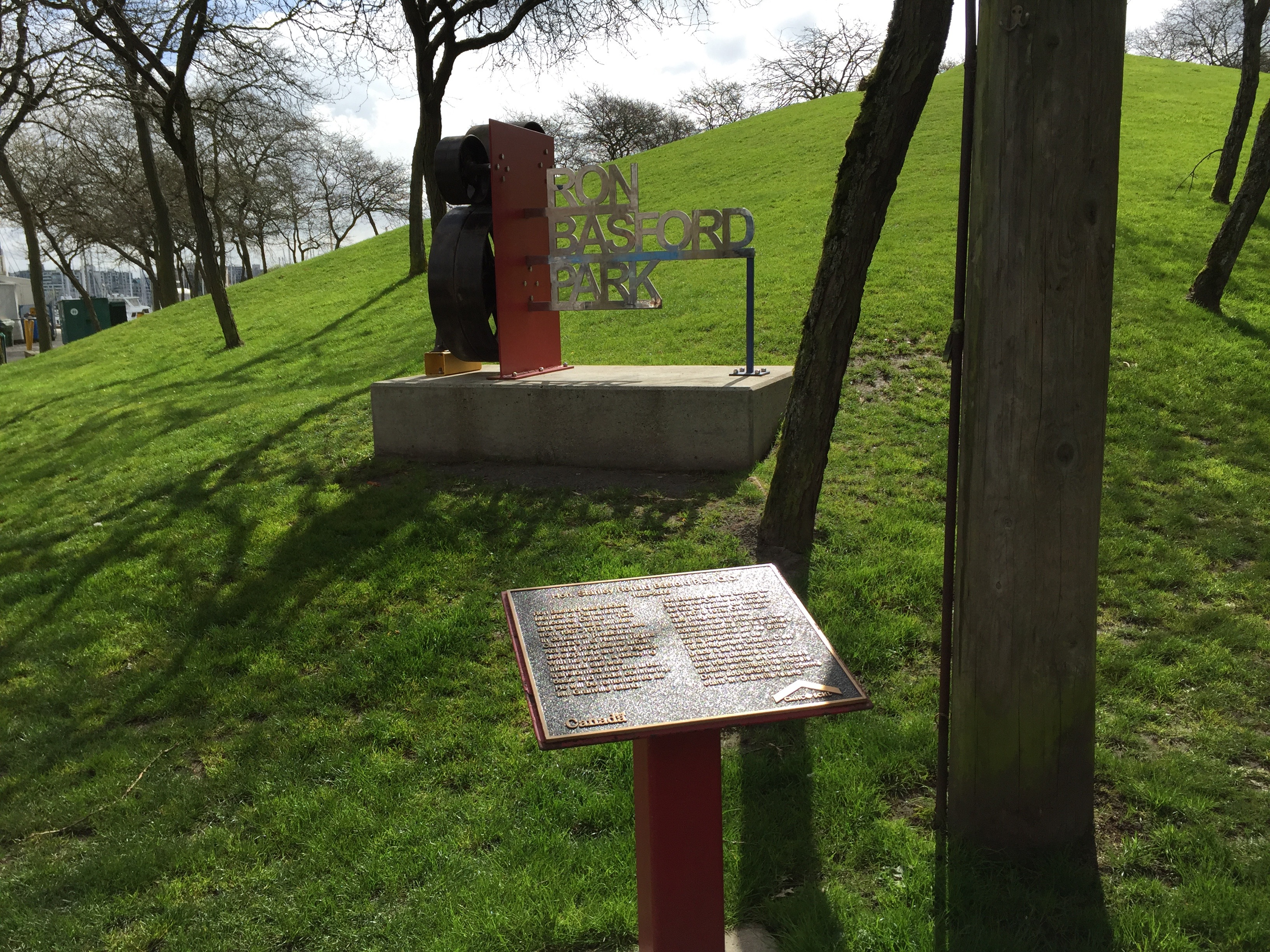
Hill in centre of Ron Basford Park, Granville Island

Ron Basford Park at Granville Island is named after him.

== Electoral history ==
1974 Canadian federal election: Vancouver Centre
Party	Candidate	Votes	%	±%
Liberal	Ron Basford	19,064	41.74	+0.39
Progressive Conservative	Doug Davis	17,143	37.53	+7.27
New Democratic	Ron K. Johnson	8,859	19.39	–7.26
Social Credit	Walter Muller	257	0.56	–0.79
Communist	Betty Greenwell	213	0.47	–
Marxist–Leninist	Charles Shrybman	141	0.31	–
Total valid votes		45,677	99.45	
Total rejected ballots		252	0.55	–1.71
Turnout		45,929	68.32	–1.29
Eligible voters		67,222		
Liberal hold		Swing		−3.44
Source: Library of Parliament

1972 Canadian federal election: Vancouver Centre
Party	Candidate	Votes	%	±%
Liberal	Ron Basford	19,341	41.35	–14.75
Progressive Conservative	John McDonald	14,156	30.26	+11.89
New Democratic	Ron K. Johnson	12,470	26.66	+2.05
Social Credit	Nicholas Zambus	632	1.35	–
Independent	Arnold August	77	0.16	–
Independent	Ray Dodge	55	0.12	–
Independent	Daniel Ivan Fedoruk	46	0.10	–
Total valid votes		46,777	97.74	
Total rejected ballots		1,081	2.26	+1.50
Turnout		47,858	69.61	–1.20
Eligible voters		68,748		
Liberal hold		Swing		−13.32
Source: Library of Parliament

1968 Canadian federal election: Vancouver Centre
Party	Candidate	Votes	%	±%
Liberal	Ron Basford	25,426	56.10	+16.02
New Democratic	William H. Deverell	11,151	24.60	+1.54
Progressive Conservative	David Kilgour	8,326	18.37	–9.43
Republican	Gerard Goeujon	420	0.93	–
Total valid votes		45,323	99.24	
Total rejected ballots		348	0.76	–0.64
Turnout		45,671	70.81	+4.96
Eligible voters		64,498		
Liberal hold		Swing		+7.24
Source: Library of Parliament

Parliament of Canada
Preceded by Thomas Berger	Member of Parliament for Vancouver—Burrard; 1963–1968	Succeeded by Last member, riding abolished in 1966
Preceded by Jack R. Nicholson	Member of Parliament for Vancouver Centre; 1968–1979	Succeeded by Art Phillips
Political offices
Preceded by John Turner	Minister of Consumer and Corporate Affairs; 1968–1972	Succeeded by Bob Andras
Preceded by Robert Stanbury	Minister of National Revenue; 1974–1975	Succeeded by Bud Cullen
Preceded by Otto Lang	Minister of Justice; 1975–1978	Succeeded by Otto Lang
Preceded by Francis Fox	Solicitor General of Canada; 1978	Succeeded by Jean-Jacques Blais
