= Vancouver-Burrard (provincial electoral district) =

Defunct provincial electoral district in British Columbia, Canada

Vancouver-Burrard was a provincial electoral district for the Legislative Assembly of British Columbia, Canada. It first appeared on the hustings in the 1933 general election and included the neighbourhoods of Kitsilano and Fairview. This version of the riding was abolished in 1979, and its territory was divided between Vancouver-Point Grey, Vancouver-Little Mountain, and Vancouver Centre.

In 1991, a new Vancouver-Burrard was established, containing the western half of the former Vancouver Centre. For the 2009 election, the riding was split across two new ridings. The portion west of Burrard, Georgia, and Jervis became the new Vancouver-West End riding. The remainder of Vancouver-Burrard joined part of Vancouver-Fairview to become the new Vancouver-False Creek riding.

== Demographics ==
From 2001 Canadian Census

Population, 2001	64,046
Population Change, 1996–2001	20.9%
Area (km^{2})	8.89
Pop. Density (people per km^{2})	7,204

== Members of the Legislative Assembly ==
=== Dual-member district ===
Assembly	Years	Seat 1		Seat 2	
Assembly	Years	Member	Party	Member	Party
18th	1933–1935	Gerald Gratton McGeer	Liberal	Helen Douglas Smith	Liberal
18th	1935–1937	John Howard Forester	Liberal	Helen Douglas Smith	Liberal
19th	1937–1941	John Howard Forester	Liberal	Helen Douglas Smith	Liberal
20th	1941–1945	Charles Grant MacNeil	CCF	Winona Grace MacInnis	CCF
21st	1945–1949	Donald Cameron Brown	Coalition (PC)	George Moir Weir	Coalition (Liberal)
22nd	1949–1952	Donald Cameron Brown	Coalition (PC)	John Groves Gould	Coalition (Liberal)
23rd	1952–1953	Eric Martin	Social Credit	Bert Price	Social Credit
24th	1953–1956	Eric Martin	Social Credit	Bert Price	Social Credit
25th	1956–1960	Eric Martin	Social Credit	Bert Price	Social Credit
26th	1960–1963	Eric Martin	Social Credit	Bert Price	Social Credit
27th	1963–1966	Eric Martin	Social Credit	Bert Price	Social Credit
28th	1966–1969	Tom Berger	NDP	Ray Parkinson	NDP
29th	1969–1972	Harold Merilees	Social Credit	Bert Price	Social Credit
30th	1972–1975	Norman Levi	NDP	Rosemary Brown	NDP
31st	1975–1979	Norman Levi	NDP	Rosemary Brown	NDP
Riding dissolved into Vancouver Centre, Vancouver-Little Mountain and Vancouver-Point Grey

=== Single-member district ===
Assembly	Years	Member	Party
Riding re-created from Vancouver Centre
35th	1991–1996	Emery Barnes	NDP
36th	1996–2001	Tim Stevenson	NDP
37th	2001–2005	Lorne Mayencourt	Liberal
38th	2005–2008	Lorne Mayencourt	Liberal
38th	2008–2009	Spencer Herbert	NDP
Riding re-dissolved into Vancouver-False Creek and Vancouver-West End

== Election results ==
1933 British Columbia general election
Party	Candidate	Votes	%	Elected
Liberal	Gerald Gratton McGeer	10,022	24.9	✓
Liberal	Helen Douglas Smith	9,117	22.7	✓
Co-operative Commonwealth	Mildred Minnie Osterhout	6,546	16.3	
Co-operative Commonwealth	John Sidaway	6,311	15.7	
Non-Partisan Independent Group	John Bennett	3,449	8.6	
Non-Partisan Independent Group	David McKenzie	2,193	5.5	
Unionist	William Middleton Dennies	1,231	3.1	
Unionist	Chris "H" Barker	502	1.2	
Independent Co-operative Commonwealth	Charles Bolton McKinnon	277	0.7	
United Front	Flora Hutton	235	0.6	
Independent Liberal	Lynn Browne	230	0.6	
Socialist	William Black	109	0.3	
Total valid votes		40,222	100.00	
Total rejected ballots		168	0.4	
Turnout		20,946	68.2	

British Columbia provincial by-election, September 2, 1936
Party	Candidate	Votes	%	Elected
Liberal	John Howard Forester	7,459	36.87	✓
Co-operative Commonwealth	James Lyle Telford	7,072	34.96	
Conservative	Frank Porter Patterson	5,654	27.95	
Socialist	Robert Christopher Walker	45	0.22	
Total valid votes		20,233	100.00	
Total rejected ballots		189	-	

Reason for by-election: Resignation of Gerald Gratton McGeer to contest federal election.

1937 British Columbia general election
Party	Candidate	Votes	%	Elected
Liberal	John Howard Forester	8,606	18.6	✓
Liberal	Helen Douglas Smith	8,297	17.9	✓
Co-operative Commonwealth	Donald Stewart Maxwell	7,367	15.9	
Conservative	Halford David Wilson	7,238	15.7	
Co-operative Commonwealth	Austin Stanley Trotter	7,056	15.3	
Conservative	Charles John White	6,265	13.6	
Constructivist	George Anderson Pollock	401	0.9	
Constructivist	Catherine Emily Bufton	364	0.8	
Social Credit	Edith May Brooks	300	0.6	
Social Credit	Peer Vernon Paynter	281	0.6	
Financial Justice	George Henry Broughton	54	0.1	
Total valid votes		46,229	100.00	
Total rejected ballots		377	0.8	
Turnout		24,434	70.7	

1941 British Columbia general election
Party	Candidate	Votes	%	Elected
Co-operative Commonwealth	Charles Grant MacNeil	9,596	19.0	✓
Co-operative Commonwealth	Winona Grace MacInnis	9,402	18.6	✓
Conservative	Donald Cameron Brown	8,283	16.4	
Conservative	George Clark Miller	8,281	16.4	
Liberal	John Howard Forester	7,505	14.8	
Liberal	Helen Douglas Smith	7,276	14.4	
Socialist Labour	John Alexander Fedoruk	267	0.5	
Total valid votes		50,610	100.00	
Total rejected ballots		268	1.2	
Turnout		26,511	70.4	

1945 British Columbia general election
Party	Candidate	Votes	%	Elected
Coalition	George Moir Weir	14,938	57.65	✓
Coalition	Donald Cameron Brown	14,711	56.78	✓
Co-operative Commonwealth	Winona Grace MacInnis	10,150	39.17	
Co-operative Commonwealth	Charles Grant MacNeil	10,071	38.87	
Labor–Progressive	Joan Mason	1,042	4.02	
Labor–Progressive	Sidney Zlotnik	988	3.81	
Social Credit	Peer Paynter	668	2.58	
Social Credit	James W. Wardrop	551	2.13	
Socialist Labour	John Fedoruk	107	0.41	
Total valid votes		25,910	100.00	
Total rejected ballots		205		
Turnout		52.6		

1949 British Columbia general election
Party	Candidate	Votes	%	Elected
Coalition	Donald Cameron Brown	20,230	61.00	✓
Coalition	John Groves Gould	19,926	60.08	✓
Co-operative Commonwealth	Alex Macdonald	11,037	33.28	
Co-operative Commonwealth	Charles Grant MacNeil	10,737	32.38	
Social Credit	Eric Martin	727	2.19	
Social Credit	James Wardrop	531	1.60	
Independent	Irving Finkleman	396	1.19	
Union of Electors	John S. Adam	95	0.29	
Total valid votes		33,164	100.00	
Total rejected ballots		312		
Turnout		66.9		

1952 British Columbia general election, ballot A
Party	Candidate	Votes 1st count	%	Votes final count	%
Social Credit	Eric Martin	9,166	27.97	13,222	51.25
Co-operative Commonwealth	Alex Macdonald	10,037	30.62	12,578	48.75
Liberal	J. Howard Forester	6,166	18.81		
Progressive Conservative	Donald Cameron Brown	5,765	17.58		
Christian Democratic	George F. Pedlar	1,064	3.25		
Independent	Emil Bjarnason	577	1.76		
Total valid votes		32,775	100.00	25,800	100.00
Total rejected ballots		1,598			
Total registered voters		60,006			
Turnout		57.28			
Note: Preferential ballot; first and final of five (5) counts only shown.

1952 British Columbia general election, ballot B
Party	Candidate	Votes 1st count	%	Votes final count	%
Social Credit	Bert Price	9,002	27.77	13,166	50.47
Co-operative Commonwealth	Charles Grant MacNeil	10,397	32.07	12,920	49.53
Liberal	John Groves Gould	6,358	19.61		
Progressive Conservative	John D. Cornett	5,615	17.32		
Christian Democratic	John M. Stephens	1,046	3.23		
Total valid votes		32,418	100.00	26,086	100.00
Total rejected ballots		1,900			
Total registered voters		60,006			
Turnout		57.19			
Note: Preferential ballot; first and final of five (5) counts only shown.

1953 British Columbia general election, ballot A
Party	Candidate	Votes 1st count	%	Votes final count	%
Social Credit	Eric Martin	11,527	39.8	14,924	56.8
Co-operative Commonwealth	Macdonald	9,216	31.8	11,360	43.2
Liberal	John Groves Gould	5,936	20.5		
Progressive Conservative	Allan	1,259	4.3		
Christian Democratic	Walshe	658	2.3		
Labor–Progressive	Rankin	360	1.2		
Total valid votes		28,956	100.00	26,284	100.00
Total rejected ballots		1,885			
Total registered voters		53,412			
Turnout		57.7			
Note: Preferential ballot; first and final of five (5) counts only shown.

1953 British Columbia general election, ballot B
Party	Candidate	Votes 1st count	%	Votes final count	%
Social Credit	Bert Price	11,273	39.2	14,674	56.2
Co-operative Commonwealth	Charles Grant MacNeil	9,313	32.4	11,446	43.8
Liberal	Odlum	5,858	20.4		
Progressive Conservative	Carmichael	1,276	4.4		
Christian Democratic	Zunti	643	2.2		
Labor–Progressive	Whyte	367	1.3		
Total valid votes		28,740	100.00	26,120	100.00
Total rejected ballots		2,131			
Total registered voters		53,412			
Turnout		57.8			
Note: Preferential ballot; first and final of five (5) counts only shown.

1956 British Columbia general election
Party	Candidate	Votes	%	Elected
Social Credit	Eric Martin	12,824	24.9	✓
Social Credit	Bert Price	12,180	23.3	✓
Co-operative Commonwealth	MacDonald	7,826	14.9	
Co-operative Commonwealth	Burns	7,322	14.0	
Liberal	Millar	4,972	9.5	
Liberal	McCay	4,424	8.4	
Progressive Conservative	Macaulay	1,095	2.1	
Progressive Conservative	Caine	1,006	1.9	
Labor–Progressive	Whyte	260	0.5	
Labor–Progressive	Weinstein	257	0.5	
Independent	Todd	203	0.4	
Total valid votes		52,369	100.00	
Total rejected ballots		608	1.2	
Turnout		27,798	53.3	

1960 British Columbia general election
Party	Candidate	Votes	%	Elected
Social Credit	Eric Martin	10,642	18.9	✓
Social Credit	Bert Price	10,231	18.1	✓
Co-operative Commonwealth	Neale	9,505	16.9	
Co-operative Commonwealth	Vulliamy	9,333	16.6	
Liberal	Kearney	5,715	10.1	
Liberal	Lyon	5,744	10.2	
Progressive Conservative	Sturdy	2,611	4.6	
Progressive Conservative	Thomas	1,904	3.4	
Communist	Edwards	339	0.6	
Communist	Samuelson	271	0.5	
Independent	Finkleman	87	0.2	
Total valid votes		56,382	100.00	
Total rejected ballots		621	1.1	
Turnout		29,534	50.6	

1963 British Columbia general election
Party	Candidate	Votes	%	Elected
Social Credit	Eric Martin	11,181	19.1	✓
Social Credit	Bert Price	10,612	18.1	✓
New Democratic	Thomas Rodney Berger	10,345	17.6	
New Democratic	Neale	8,998	15.3	
Liberal	Phillips	5,798	9.9	
Liberal	Mussallem	5,291	9.0	
Progressive Conservative	Coultas	3,457	5.9	
Progressive Conservative	Ashdown	2,975	5.1	
Total valid votes		58,657	100.00	
Total rejected ballots		468	1.16	
Turnout		31,022	52.9	

1966 British Columbia general election
Party	Candidate	Votes	%	Elected
New Democratic	Thomas Rodney Berger	9,849	24.4	✓
New Democratic	Raymond Parkinson	9,498	23.5	✓
Social Credit	Alsbury	7,584	18.8	
Social Credit	Bert Price	7,584	18.8	
Liberal	Brennan	3,190	7.9	
Liberal	Higgs	2,681	6.6	
Total valid votes		40,386	100.00	
Total rejected ballots		322	0.78	
Turnout		20,988	58.3	

1991 British Columbia general election
Party	Candidate	Votes	%	Expenditures
New Democratic	Emery Barnes	9,725	50.93	$56,902
Liberal	Steven R. Bourne	6,727	35.23	$7,987
Social Credit	Joy Davies	2,201	11.53	$29,256
Green	Andy Telfer	441	2.31	$1,349
Total valid votes		19,094	100.00	
Total rejected ballots		552	2.81	
Turnout		19,646	65.59	

1996 British Columbia general election
Party	Candidate	Votes	%	±%	Expenditures
New Democratic	Tim Stevenson	10,646	49.70	−1.23	$43,534
Liberal	Duncan Wilson	7,975	37.23	+2.00	$50,880
Progressive Democrat	Laura McDiarmid	1,014	4.73	–	$1,072
Green	Imtiaz Popat	563	2.63	+0.32	$155
Reform	Aletta Buday	671	3.13	–	$100
Libertarian	John Clarke	458	2.14	–	
Natural Law	Wayne A. Melvin	93	0.43	–	$100
Total valid votes		21,420	100.00		
Total rejected ballots		257	1.19		
Turnout		21,677	62.68		

2001 British Columbia general election
Party	Candidate	Votes	%	±%	Expenditures
Liberal	Lorne Mayencourt	11,396	48.11	+10.88	$46,939
New Democratic	Tim Stevenson	7,359	31.07	−18.63	$45,493
Green	Robbie Mattu	3,826	16.15	+13.52	$1,029
Marijuana	Marc Emery	906	3.82	–	$394
Unity	Gregory Paul Michael Hartnell	290	1.15	–	–
Independent	Boris Bear	136	0.57	–	$157
People's Front	Joseph Theriault	40	0.17	–	$57
Independent Rhinoceros	Helvis	25	0.11	–	$100
Total valid votes		23,688	100.00		
Total rejected ballots		123	0.52		
Turnout		23,811	63.67		

2005 British Columbia general election
Party	Candidate	Votes	%	±%	Expenditures
Liberal	Lorne Mayencourt	12,009	42.16	−5.94	$161,227
New Democratic	Tim Stevenson	11,998	42.12	+11.04	$67,587
Green	Janek Patrick John Kuchmistrz	3,698	12.98	−3.21	$8,237
Libertarian	John Clarke	388	1.36	–	$100
Work Less	Lisa Voldeng	170	0.60	–	$1,855
Sex	John Gordon Ince	111	0.39	–	$100
Democratic Reform	Ian McLeod	82	0.29	–	$400
Platinum	Antonio Francisco Ferreira	27	0.09	–	$100
Total valid votes		28,483	100		
Total rejected ballots		196	0.69		
Turnout		28,679	51.95		

British Columbia provincial by-election, October 29, 2008
Party	Candidate	Votes	%	±%	Expenditures
New Democratic	Spencer Herbert	6,998	50.67	+8.57	$62,474
Liberal	Arthur Griffiths	5,089	36.85	−5.24	$91,934
Green	Drina Read	741	5.37	−7.70	$2,788
Conservative	Ian McLeod	599	4.34	–	$2,379
Marijuana	Marc Emery	384	2.78	–	$1,840
Total valid votes		13,811	100		
Total rejected ballots		26	0.19		
Turnout		13,837	23.21		

== See also ==
- List of British Columbia provincial electoral districts
- Canadian provincial electoral districts
- Vancouver (electoral districts)
