= Raymond Parkinson =

Canadian politician (1922–2018)

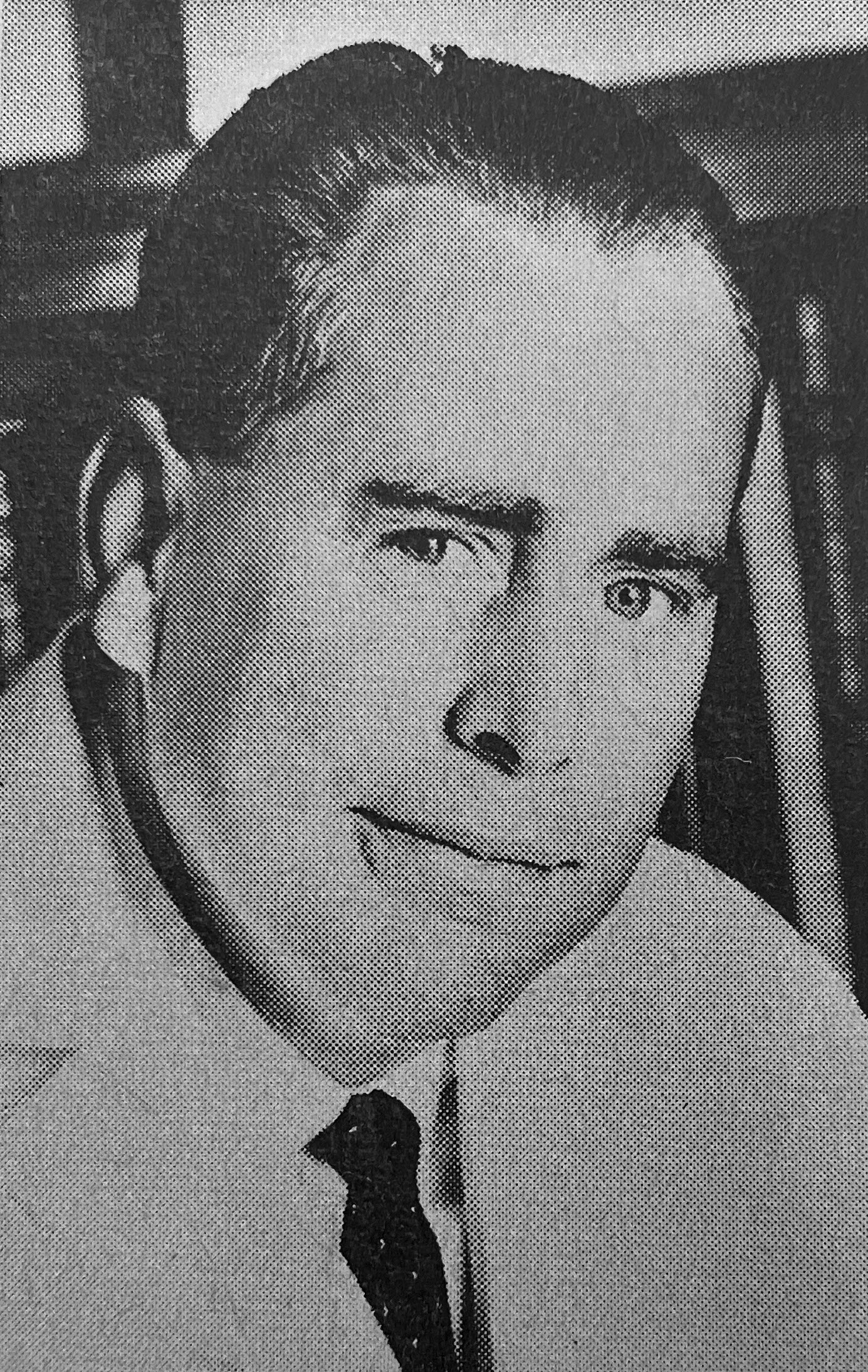

MLA for Vancouver-Burrard
- In office 1966–1969

Personal details
- Born: March 22, 1922 Winnipeg, Manitoba
- Died: June 28, 2018 (aged 96)
- Party: British Columbia New Democratic Party

Raymond Parkinson (March 22, 1922 – June 28, 2018) was a Canadian psychiatrist and politician in British Columbia. Along with Tom Berger, he represented Vancouver-Burrard in the Legislative Assembly of British Columbia from 1966 to 1969 as a New Democratic Party (NDP) member.

He served in the Royal Canadian Army Medical Corps and the Medical Services unit of the Royal Canadian Air Force during World War II. After the war, Parkinson studied at the University of British Columbia and McGill University and went on to practise at the Medical Health Centre in Burnaby. He also consulted at the Fraser Valley Health Units in Chilliwack and Mission. Parkinson was defeated when he ran for reelection to the provincial assembly in 1969. After leaving politics, he returned to private practice in Vancouver. Parkinson was married to Ella McWilliam. He was a member of the board of governors for Simon Fraser University, serving five years as board chairman. Parkinson died in June 2018 at the age of 96.
