= John Howard Forester =

Canadian politician (1887-1958)

Member of the Legislative Assembly of British Columbia
- In office 1936–1941
- Constituency: Vancouver-Burrard

Personal details
- Born: April 2, 1887 Winterbourne, Ontario
- Died: January 12, 1958 (aged 70) Vancouver, British Columbia
- Party: British Columbia Liberal Party
- Spouse: Mary Eleanor Louise Mutrie

John Howard Forester (April 2, 1887 – January 12, 1958) was a Canadian politician. He served in the Legislative Assembly of British Columbia from a 1936 provincial byelection until his defeat in the 1941 provincial election, from the electoral district of Vancouver-Burrard, a member of the Liberal party. He was also an unsuccessful candidate for the Liberal party in the 1952 provincial election.
