= Charles E. Jones (politician) =

Canadian politician (1881–1948)

Charles E. Jones (19 January 1881 – 1 September 1948) was the 26th mayor of Vancouver, British Columbia from August 1947 until September 1948. He was born in Whitby, England and moved to Vancouver in 1905. It is uncertain whether the Whitby of his birth was the fishing port in Yorkshire, or the district of Whitby in Ellesmere Port on the Wirral (across the Mersey from Liverpool), but his birthplace is likely the latter. A Charles Jones was listed on the 1901 census return for Whitby, Ellesmere Port who was age 20 at the time, and could be the same Charles E. Jones who was born in 1881.

Mayor Gerald McGeer unexpectedly died in August 1947. Jones was proclaimed the city's mayor for the remainder of McGeer's term, then won re-election for 1948. However, Jones himself would die during his mayoral term. George Clark Miller would function as mayor for the remainder of Jones' term.
