= John Groves Gould =

Canadian politician

MLA for Vancouver-Burrard
- In office 1949–1952

Personal details
- Born: April 20, 1912 Vancouver, British Columbia
- Died: February 7, 2002 (aged 89) Palm Springs, California
- Party: British Columbia Liberal Party

John Groves Gould (April 20, 1912 – February 7, 2002) was a Canadian lawyer and political figure in British Columbia. He represented Vancouver-Burrard in the Legislative Assembly of British Columbia as a Liberal from 1949 to 1952.

He was born in Vancouver, British Columbia, the son of John Gould, a native of England, and Clara Groves. Groves served as a lieutenant with the Royal Canadian Navy in the North Atlantic and Mediterranean during World War II. He served as a member of a Liberal-Conservative coalition in the provincial assembly. Groves was defeated when he ran for reelection in 1952 and 1953.

He died in 2002 after a brief illness.
