= B. Milton MacIntyre =

Canadian Politician

Member of the Legislative Assembly of British Columbia
- In office 1949–1952
- Preceded by: Herbert Gargrave
- Succeeded by: Anthony Gargrave
- Constituency: Mackenzie

Personal details
- Born: March 8, 1907 Florence, Nova Scotia, Canada
- Died: November 27, 1968 (aged 61) Vancouver, British Columbia, Canada
- Party: Coalition
- Spouse: Gladice Lilian Wilshire
- Occupation: Hotel proprietor

Battleman Milton MacIntyre (March 8, 1907 – November 27, 1968) was a Canadian politician. After running unsuccessfully in the 1937 provincial election for the Conservative Party, he served in the Legislative Assembly of British Columbia from 1949 to 1952, from the electoral district of Mackenzie, a member of the Coalition government. Running as a member of the Liberal Party, he was an unsuccessful candidate in both the 1952 and 1953 provincial elections.
