= Donald Cameron Brown =

Canadian politician (1892–1963)

Member of the Legislative Assembly of British Columbia
- In office 1945–1952
- Constituency: Vancouver-Burrard

Personal details
- Born: February 22, 1892; Winchester, Ontario
- Died: October 26, 1963 (aged 71); Vancouver, British Columbia
- Political party: Coalition
- Spouse: Buda Hosmer Jenkins
- Children: 1
- Occupation: Flour and grain businessman

Donald Cameron Brown (February 22, 1892 – October 26, 1963) was a Canadian politician. After being an unsuccessful candidate in the 1941 provincial election, he served in the Legislative Assembly of British Columbia from 1945 to 1952, from the electoral district of Vancouver-Burrard, as a member of the Coalition government. He was defeated when he sought a third term in the Legislature in the 1952 provincial election. He served as deputy speaker of the Legislature between 1950 and 1952.
