= Lorne MacDougall =

Canadian politician (1898–1956)

Member of Parliament for Vancouver—Burrard
- In office June 1949 – June 1956

Personal details
- Born: John Lorne MacDougall; 18 November 1898 Tiverton, Ontario
- Died: 6 June 1956 (aged 57) Ottawa, Ontario
- Party: Liberal
- Spouse: Marjorie Sinclair Smart (m. 1942)
- Profession: dentist, executive, organizer

John Lorne MacDougall (18 November 1898 – 6 June 1956) was a Liberal party member of the House of Commons of Canada.

MacDougall was born in Tiverton, Ontario, moved to Saskatchewan in childhood, then studied dentistry at Toronto's Ontario Dental College. He fought in World War I in the same army unit as fellow House of Commons member John Diefenbaker. Due to injuries sustained in the war, MacDougall was unable to continue dentistry and moved towards other jobs such as a Liberal Party organizer in British Columbia.

His first federal election campaign was in 1935 at Vancouver East where he was unsuccessful. MacDougall won his second federal campaign in the 1949 election at the Vancouver—Burrard riding. MacDougall was re-elected there in the 1953 election.

In June 1956 MacDougall collapsed from a heart attack in Parliament's Centre Block building and died on the scene. MacDougall was part of a stressful parliamentary debate regarding the Trans-Canada Pipeline which resulted in three other Members of Parliament being admitted to hospital. At the time, MacDougall's death was blamed on this stress.

== See also ==
- Augustus Pierce, a New York City alderman who died during a legislative session in 1934
