= Wilfred Hanbury =

Canadian politician (1887–1966)

Member of Parliament for Vancouver—Burrard
- In office July 1930 – October 1935

Personal details
- Born: 16 January 1887 Brandon, Manitoba, Canada
- Died: 9 January 1966 (aged 78) Vancouver, British Columbia, Canada
- Party: Liberal
- Spouse(s): Edith Cleveland Carter m. 28 June 1914
- Profession: lumberman, manufacturer

Wilfred Hanbury (16 January 1887 – 9 January 1966) was a Liberal party member of the House of Commons of Canada. He was born in Brandon, Manitoba and became a lumberman and manufacturer.

Hanbury attended St. John's College in Winnipeg and became president of the Pondosa Pine Lumber Company and a director of J. Hanbury company.

He was first elected to Parliament at the Vancouver—Burrard riding in the 1930 general election after a previous unsuccessful campaign there in the 1926 election. After completing his only term, the 17th Canadian Parliament, Hanbury left federal politics and did not seek re-election in the 1935 election.
