= Allan James McDonell =

Canadian politician

Member of the Legislative Assembly of British Columbia
- In office 1945–1952
- Constituency: Vancouver Centre

Personal details
- Born: January 26, 1882 Toronto, Ontario
- Died: March 31, 1957 (aged 75) Vancouver, British Columbia
- Party: Coalition
- Spouse: Ruth Fitch
- Children: 1
- Occupation: Manufacturer

Allan James McDonell (January 26, 1882 – March 31, 1957) was a Canadian politician. He served in the Legislative Assembly of British Columbia from 1945 to 1952 from the electoral district of Vancouver Centre, a member of the Coalition government. Running as a Progressive Conservative Party candidate, he was defeated in his bid to serve a third term in the Legislature in the 1952 provincial election. He never sought provincial office again.
