= Thomas R. Berger =

Canadian lawyer, politician, and judge (1933–2021)

Thomas R. Berger QC OC OBC
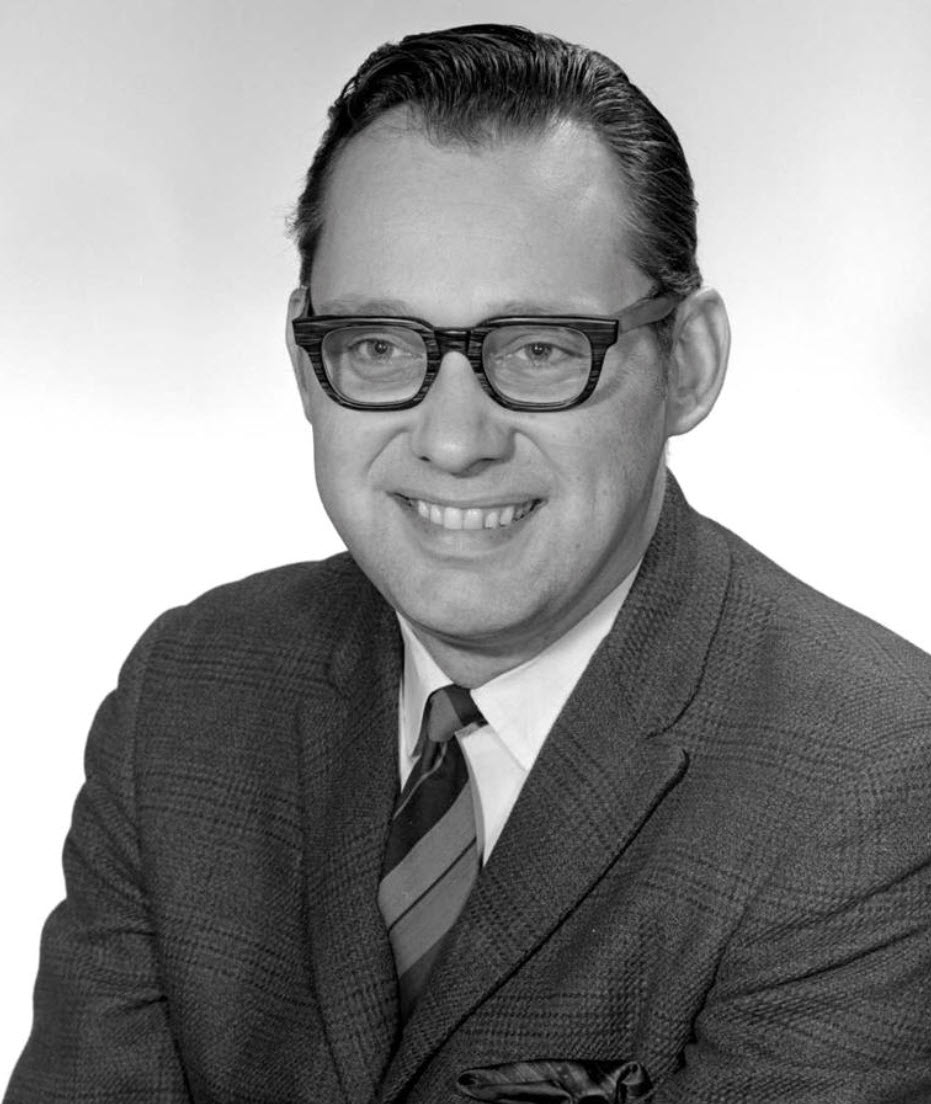

Judge of the Supreme Court of British Columbia
- In office 1971–1983

Member of the Legislative Assembly of British Columbia for Vancouver-Burrard
- In office 1966–1969

Member of the Canadian Parliament for Vancouver—Burrard
- In office 1962–1963
- Preceded by: John Russell Taylor
- Succeeded by: Ron Basford

Personal details
- Born: Thomas Rodney Berger; March 23, 1933 Victoria, British Columbia
- Died: April 28, 2021 (aged 88) Vancouver, British Columbia
- Party: New Democratic Party
- Education: University of British Columbia (BA, LLB)

Thomas Rodney Berger QC OC OBC (March 23, 1933 – April 28, 2021) was a Canadian politician and jurist. He was of Swedish origin. He was briefly a member of the House of Commons of Canada in the early 1960s, entering provincial politics thereafter. He led the British Columbia New Democratic Party for most of 1969, prior to Dave Barrett. Berger was a justice of the Supreme Court of British Columbia from 1971 to 1983. In 1974, Berger became the royal commissioner of the Mackenzie Valley Pipeline Inquiry, which released its findings in 1977. After retiring from the bench, Berger continued to practise law and served in various public capacities. He was a member of the Order of Canada and the Order of British Columbia.

== Early life and education ==
Thomas Rodney Berger was born on March 23, 1933, in Victoria, British Columbia. He was the son of Royal Canadian Mounted Police sergeant Theodor Berger and Nettie Elsie Perle, née McDonald. Berger received a Bachelor of Arts and Bachelor of Laws from the University of British Columbia in 1955 and 1956, respectively.

== Career ==
=== Politics ===
Thomas R. Berger was elected at the age of 29 to the House of Commons in the 1962 election, representing the riding of Vancouver—Burrard for the New Democratic Party. However, in the 1963 election, he was defeated by Liberal opponent Ron Basford.

He was elected to the Legislative Assembly of British Columbia in the 1966 BC election. Described as a "young man in a hurry", Berger challenged long-time BC CCF/NDP leader Robert Strachan for the party leadership in 1967. Strachan defeated Berger but, sensing the winds of change, resigned in 1969. Berger defeated another young MLA, Dave Barrett, to win the leadership convention and was widely expected to lead the NDP to its first general election victory. Social Credit Premier W.A.C. Bennett called an early snap election and, instead of victory, Berger's NDP lost four seats. He quickly resigned and was succeeded by Dave Barrett. Berger's last year as an MLA was 1969.

=== Law ===
Berger was counsel to the Nisga'a in Calder v British Columbia (Attorney General), a case that inaugurated the concept of Aboriginal title in Canadian law.

Appointed to the Supreme Court of British Columbia in 1971, he served on the bench until 1983. Berger focused extensively on ensuring that industrial development on Aboriginal people's land resulted in benefits to those indigenous people. He may be best known for his work as the Royal Commissioner of the Mackenzie Valley Pipeline Inquiry which released its findings on May 9, 1977.

In 1981 when Canada was debating the merits of a diversity of provisions in the proposed Canadian Charter of Rights and Freedoms, Berger wrote an open letter to The Globe and Mail, asserting that the rights of Aboriginal Canadians and women needed to be included in any proposed charter. In 1983 he was reprimanded by the Canadian Judicial Council for this activism. Shortly thereafter he chose to resign as a judge and returned to practice as a lawyer. Berger's expertise and reputation for thorough and independent assessment were immediately seen as an asset for indigenous communities. He was invited by the Inuit Circumpolar Conference to lead the Alaska Native Review Commission (1983–1985) which culminated in the publication of Village Journey (1985).

In 1995, Thomas Berger was appointed Special Counsel to the Attorney General of British Columbia to inquire into allegations of sexual abuse at the Jericho Hill School for the Deaf. Berger was asked to investigate these allegations and produce a report. His recommendation for relief and compensation for those who were abused was accepted.

Berger was appointed chair of the Vancouver Electoral Reform Commission in 2003. The Commission recommended changing Vancouver's at-large system to a system of ward-level representation. However, this recommendation was defeated in a referendum held on October 16, 2004.

Appointed in 2005 as a conciliator to resolve the impasse between Canada, Nunavut, and Nunavut Tunngavik Incorporated in implementing the Nunavut Land Claims Agreement, Berger completed "The Nunavut Project" in 2006. His report addresses the fundamental changes needed to implement Article 23 (Inuit Employment within Government) of the Nunavut Land Claims Agreement, including the need for a strong indigenous education system.

In 2017, Berger was counsel to British Columbia in its challenge to Canada's approval of the Trans Mountain pipeline.

== Royal commissions ==
From 1973 to 1975, Berger chaired a royal commission on Family and Children's Law.

From 1974 to 1977, he was commissioner of the Mackenzie Valley Pipeline Inquiry.

From 1979 to 1980, he chaired his third royal commission, on Indian and Inuit healthcare. In 1978, Indian bands and organizations such as the Union of B.C. Chiefs, the Native Brotherhood and United Native Nations, engaged in intense lobbying for Indigenous people to control delivery of health services in their own communities and for the repeal of restrictive service "guidelines introduced in September 1978, to correct abuses in health delivery, and to deal with the environmental health hazards of mercury and fluoride pollution affecting particular communities."

In September 1979, David Crombie, a liberal-minded reformer, as Minister of Health and Welfare under the Conservative government of Prime Minister Joe Clark, issued a statement representing "current Federal Government practice and policy in the field of Indian health." Crombie declared that the "Federal Government is committed to joining with Indian representatives in a fundamental review of issues involved in Indian health when Indian representatives have developed their position, and the policy emerging from that review could supersede this policy". Crombie appointed Doctor Gary Goldthorpe, as commissioner of the federal inquiry (known as the Goldthorpe Inquiry) into "alleged abuses in medical care delivery at Alert Bay, British Columbia".

In 1980, Justice Berger, who headed his third royal commission dealing with Indian and Inuit healthcare, recommended to Crombie "that there be greater consultation with Indians and Inuit regarding the delivery of healthcare programs and that an annual sum of $950,000 was allocated for distribution by the National Indian Brotherhood to develop health consultation structures within the national Indian community." Crombie's successor as Liberal Minister of Health and Welfare, Monique Begin, adopted Berger's recommendations, ushering in the beginning of a change in healthcare delivery.

== Honours ==
In 1989, he was made an officer of the Order of Canada. In 2004, he received the Order of British Columbia. A

He was an honorary member of the Royal Military College of Canada, student #S153.

In 2012, he was awarded the Queen Elizabeth II Diamond Jubilee Medal.

== Death and legacy ==
Berger died of cancer on April 28, 2021, in Vancouver.

Edgar Z. Friedenberg, writing in The New York Review of Books in 1982, called Berger "perhaps the most effective and certainly the most respectable champion of the aboriginal peoples of Canada". Berger argued that the reconciliation between Indigenous and non-Indigenous peoples could be facilitated by the Canadian judicial system. In her discussion of Berger's life, Swayze asserts that Berger "believes, and believes passionately, in the integrity of Canada’s system of equitable justice and its attendant jurisprudence". Throughout his career, Berger dedicated his life to law and to politics. He is recognized for his work on the Mackenzie Valley Pipeline Inquiry and the subsequent publication of The Berger Report. As Commissioner, Berger recommended that, "on environmental grounds, no pipeline be built and no energy corridor be established across the Northern Yukon" and that any pipeline construction be postponed until native claims could be settled. Despite his belief in the judicial system, Berger acknowledged that there were certain issues that could be dealt with outside of the courts. Swayze argues that "[t]he philosophy inherent in all thirteen" of the reports of British Columbia's Royal Commission on Family and Children's Law, on which Berger served as a commissioner, "is that legal sanctions should, in many cases, be a last resort, and to this end recommendations focused on the effective use of human rather than legislated solutions."

== Publications ==
- Berger, Thomas R. (December 1969). "English Canada and Quebec's Rendezvous with Independence". Alberta Law Review. 29 (4): 765–771. doi:10.29173/alr1531. ISSN 1925-8356.
- Report of the Royal Commission on Family and Children's Law. Government of British Columbia. 1974. OCLC 1796712.
- Berger, Thomas R. (1980). Report of Advisory Commission on Indian and Inuit Health Consultation. Health and Welfare Canada.
- Berger, Thomas R. (1981). Fragile Freedoms: Human Rights and Dissent in Canada. Toronto: Clarke, Irwin & Company. ISBN 0-7720-1358-6. OCLC 8269916.
- Berger, Thomas R. (1985). Village Journey: The Report of the Alaska Native Review Commission. New York: Farrar, Straus and Giroux. ISBN 0-8090-9624-2. OCLC 12342468.
- Berger, Thomas R. (1988). Northern Frontier, Northern Homeland: The Report of the Mackenzie Valley Pipeline Inquiry (rev. ed.). Vancouver: Douglas & McIntyre. ISBN 0-88894-601-5. OCLC 17580053.
- Berger, Thomas R. (2002). One Man's Justice: A Life in the Law. Douglas & McIntyre. ISBN 978-1-55365-736-1.

== Footnotes ==
Political offices
Preceded by Robert Strachan	Leader of the Opposition in the British Columbia Legislature; 1969	Succeeded by Dave Barrett
