= Elmore Philpott =

Canadian politician

Elmore Philpott MC
- Philpott in 1930

Member of the Canadian Parliament for Vancouver South
- In office 1953–1957
- Preceded by: Arthur Laing
- Succeeded by: Ernest James Broome
- Parliamentary group: █ Liberal

Co-leader of the Ontario CCF de facto while president of Ontario CCF Clubs
- In office 1933–1934 Serving with Agnes McPhail (as chairman of the Ontario CCF clubs)
- Preceded by: new position
- Succeeded by: John Mitchell (as president)

Personal details
- Born: May 2, 1896 Toronto, Ontario, Canada
- Died: December 9, 1964 (aged 68) Vancouver, British Columbia, Canada
- Party: █ Liberal █ CCF (1933–35)
- Parent: P. W. Philpott (father)
- Occupation: Politician, journalist

Military service
- Allegiance: Canada
- Branch/service: Canadian Field Artillery; Canadian Expeditionary Force
- Years of service: 1914–18
- Rank: Lieutenant (Note: Philpott was repeated presented as "Captain Elmore Philpott" in his political appearance from around 1930, though no official record are located to confirm his attainment of the rank. The Canada Gazette listed him as a Lieutenant in December 1919, months after the end of the war and the decommission of non professional troops.)
- Unit: 33rd Howitzer Battery
- Battles/wars: World War I
- Awards: Military Cross with one bar Two Mentions in Dispatches

Elmore Philpott MC (May 2, 1896 – December 9, 1964) was a Canadian soldier, politician and journalist. Twice decorated with the Military Cross while in active service, Philpott served one term as the Liberal Member of Parliament for Vancouver South from 1953 to 1957.

== Personal life ==
Philpott was one of thirteen children of Peter Wiley Philpott, a prominent evangelist and founder of the United Christian Workers which later became the Associated Gospel Churches of Canada, and Jessie Stuart Menzies.

He married Winnifred Hope Bowman in 1922 in Hamilton, Ontario.

Philpott died at the Shaughnessy Military Hospital in Vancouver, British Columbia on December 9, 1964.

== Service during World War I ==
A member of the class of '17 at the University of Toronto at the start of World War I, Philpott paused his studies and enlisted in 1914 because he feared “the war would be over by Christmas”. He was trained as a signaller and joined the Canadian 25th Field Battery in the Canadian Field Artillery. He later received a commission in the 33rd Howitzer Battery.

He arrived at Vimy prior to the Battle of Vimy Ridge and was among the Canadian artillery officers who adopted targeting techniques with improved mathematical precision during the week long shelling immediately prior to the battle which the defending German troops called “the week of suffering".

Philpott was twice mentioned in despatches by Sir Douglas Haig, commander-in-chief of the British Expeditionary Force and was decorated twice for exemplary gallantry. He was awarded the Military Cross in December 1918, for clearing out an enemy machinegun nest while commanding a section on the advance with the infantry in Amiens August, 9 1918, with the following citation:

Lt. Elmore Philpott, 33rd Bty., 9th Bde., Can. Field Artillery.

For conspicuous gallantry and resource while commanding a section co-operating with infantry. On one occasion he engaged the enemy with open sights at 600 yards' range, and cleared out machine-gun nests which were holding up the advance. He kept his section close up with the advancing infantry for 24 hours, and successfully engaged strong points.

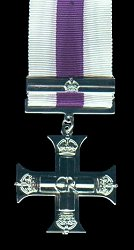
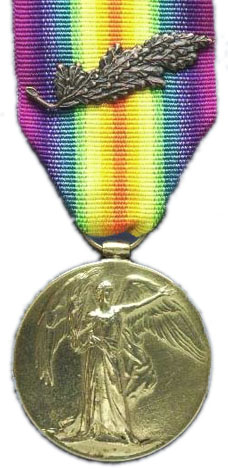
Military Cross with one bar and Victory Medal 1914–18 with a Mention in Dispatches device

He was further awarded a bar to the decoration in July the following year for act during the capture of the Hindenburg Line, with the following citation:

Lt. Elmore Philpott, M.C., 33rd Bty. 9th Bde., Can. Fd. Arty.

For marked gallantry and determination as F.O.O. in charge of a party of signallers under heavy enemy shell fire on September 2nd, 1918, in the operations east of Arras, near Éterpigny. His party came under very heavy shell fire soon after our barrage started, and he was wounded in the back. He, however, pushed forward, and was again wounded, this time seriously, but established communication with brigade headquarters and an O.P. before allowing himself to be taken to a dressing station.

(M.C. gazetted 2nd December, 1918.)

The decoration was formally present to him by Lieutenant Governor Sir John Hendrie at a ceremony held at Queen's Park on Dominion Day in 1919. Philpott was decommissioned at the rank of Lieutenant at the end of the war. He was badly wounded during the great war, and needed two canes to help him walk for the rest of his life.

A pistol of Philpott entered the collection of the Royal Canadian Artillery Museum around 2025.

== Political bids ==
After the war, Philpott became a journalist. He was on the staff of the Montreal Witness in the late 1920s, and was its managing editor when he left the Witness to join the editorial staff of the Globe in 1928.

=== Ontario Liberal leadership bid ===
While working as an associate editor for the Toronto Globe, in the lead up of the 1929 Ontario provincial election, Philpott became a high profile campaigner against the incumbent Conservative government led by Howard Ferguson. While not a candidate himself, he embarked on a campaign of to hold the government responsible for increase motor accidents, stumping for numerous candidates in support of prohibition and making featured appearances for the Ontario Prohibition Union. He also made appearance for Liberal candidates during the 1930 Dominion election.

A few weeks before the 1930 Ontario Liberal Party leadership convention, Philpott resigned from his editorship of the Globe amid speculation that he would enter the leadership contest. As a high profile war hero, Philpott was seen as a viable alternative to the interim party leader W.E.N. Sinclair, who had held the party leadership as interim leader for seven years, and posted poor results through two general elections.

As delegate entered the convention on December 16, the fourteen members of the Ontario Liberal caucus issued a statement endorsing the interim party leader, while the strong arm tactic deterred the candidacy of Sydney Tweed, the incumbent MPP for Waterloo North, it prompted an organized repudiation by some delegates. As the nominated contestants were called to the platform to give their convention address, Sinclair shocked delegates with his withdrawal from the contest. Philpott then aged 34, proceeded to first ballot with only one rival remaining, the Elgin West MP Mitchell Hepburn, also aged 34. Philpott was trounced by Hepburn by a tally of 427 to 97. Despite his loss, Philpott's convention performance received glowing coverage by the Daily Star, the main rival of his former employer.

The following year, Philpott contested a by-election held to fill the Hamilton West seat in the Ontario legislature left vacant by the death of provincial cabinet minister Frederick Thomas Smye. Philpott secured a 24-point swing against Conservative candidate Argue Martin, but came up 443 vote shy. He nonetheless reduces the Conservative's margin of victory from 52 points to 4 points. Hamilton West was redistributed to Hamilton–Wentworth and Hamilton Centre, both seats were won by the Liberals in the 1934 election when the party returned to government.

=== Brief CCF sojourn ===
However, Philpott left the Liberal Party prior to its electoral victory for a start-up party. In 1933, Philpott resigned from the Globe again to join the new Co-operative Commonwealth Federation (CCF) and was asked to lead a campaign organizing clubs for the Ontario CCF. The CCF in Ontario was organized into three sections at the time: the United Farmers of Ontario (UFO), the Labour Conference made up of socialist and labour groups, and the CCF clubs. Philpott became the president of the Ontario Association of CCF Clubs, one of the key leaders of the party in the province, and a popular stump speaker for the socialist cause.

After twenty months of intense work in the party, including leading a purge of communists, Philpott suddenly resigned in March 1934 as president of the Ontario CCF clubs, ostensibly because he was the UFO candidate for Halton in the upcoming federal election and the UFO had left the Ontario CCF over the purported influence of Communists.

In March 1935, he announced he was rejoining the Liberal Party of Canada and was nominated as the Liberal candidate in the riding of York South for the 1935 election and proceeded to claim there was a "sinister conspiracy" to merge the CCF and the Communists with Communist Party head Tim Buck as leader of the new socialist party, a claim that Ontario CCF organizer Ted Jolliffe decried as a "fantastic fabrication". In the election, Philpott placed third behind the Conservative and CCF candidates.

=== Bids in British Columbia ===
Philpott returned to journalism and moved to British Columbia in the 1940s where he became a reporter and then a columnist for the Vancouver Sun. He ran as an Independent candidate in the federal by-election held in the riding of New Westminster in 1949, placing second behind the Liberal candidate.

Philpott was nominated in 1953 as the Liberal candidate for Vancouver South when incumbent MP Arthur Laing stood down to become provincial Liberal leader in 1953. He was considered a star candidate, and his candidacy was endorsed by prominent ministers Lester Pearson, Paul Martin and C.D. Howe. He was elected to the House of Commons of Canada in the 1953 election with 36.6% vote share, benefited from the opposition being divided among three major parties. To his disappointment however, he was not selected to enter cabinet. After serving one term, he was defeated in the 1957 election with only 21% vote share. He attempted to win back his seat in the 1958 general election but was again defeated, this time with only 17.7% vote share.

Philpott stood one last time for a parliamentary seat at the 1962 general election, allowing his name to be placed on the ballot in Okanagan Boundary, an electoral district in the province's interior region where the Liberals had limited prospect. He came in a distant forth, but managed to almost double the Liberal vote share.

Philpott became a vocal Sinophile supportive of the Communist regime, advocating for the admittance of the People's Republic of China into United Nations as early as 1956.

== Electoral record ==
=== Bids to be a MP in British Columbia ===
1962 Canadian federal election: Okanagan Boundary
Party	Candidate	Votes	%	±%
Progressive Conservative	David Vaughan Pugh	9,069	31.35	–17.04
New Democratic	Owen Jones	7,956	27.50	–1.50
Social Credit	Frederick Davis Shaw	6,766	23.39	+10.53
Liberal	Elmore Philpott	5,141	17.77	+8.00
Total valid votes		28,932	99.37	
Total rejected ballots		183	0.63	+0.21
Turnout		29,115	81.03	–0.46
Eligible voters		35,932		
Progressive Conservative hold		Swing		–7.78

1958 Canadian federal election: Vancouver South
Party	Candidate	Votes	%	±%
Progressive Conservative	Ernest James Broome	22,292	60.46	+15.60
Liberal	Elmore Philpott	6,528	17.70	–3.44
Co-operative Commonwealth	Cliff Augustine Greer	5,717	15.50	+1.96
Social Credit	Hilliard Beyerstein	1,914	5.19	–12.98
Labor–Progressive	Tom McEwen	422	1.14	–1.14
Total valid votes		36,873	99.41	
Total rejected ballots		220	0.59	–0.27
Turnout		37,093	75.84	–0.54
Eligible voters		48,907		
Progressive Conservative hold		Swing		+9.52

1957 Canadian federal election: Vancouver South
Party	Candidate	Votes	%	±%
Progressive Conservative	Ernest James Broome	16,058	44.86	+27.41
Liberal	Elmore Philpott	7,568	21.14	–15.46
Social Credit	Hilliard Beyerstein	6,505	18.17	–5.16
Co-operative Commonwealth	Cliff Augustine Greer	4,849	13.55	–6.09
Labor–Progressive	Tom McEwen	817	2.28	–0.70
Total valid votes		35,797	99.14	
Total rejected ballots		311	0.86	+0.31
Turnout		36,108	76.39	+10.53
Eligible voters		47,270		
Progressive Conservative gain from Liberal		Swing		+21.44

1953 Canadian federal election: Vancouver South
Party	Candidate	Votes	%	±%
Liberal	Elmore Philpott	10,459	36.60	–3.11
Social Credit	Ira N. Monson	6,668	23.34	–
Co-operative Commonwealth	Cliff Augustine Greer	5,610	19.63	–11.93
Progressive Conservative	Lorraine Johnston	4,986	17.45	–11.28
Labor–Progressive	Gordon Wesley Elder	852	2.98	–
Total valid votes		28,575	99.45	
Total rejected ballots		157	0.55	–0.27
Turnout		28,732	65.86	–2.76
Eligible voters		43,625		
Liberal hold		Swing		–13.22

=== Bid to become a MP in Ontario ===
1935 Canadian federal election
Party	Candidate	Votes
Conservative	Earl Lawson	11,596
Co-operative Commonwealth	Luke Teskey	8,247
Liberal	Elmore Philpott	7,059
Reconstruction	Earl M. Hand	4,113

=== Bid to become a member of the Ontario Legislative Assembly ===
Ontario provincial by-election, February 11, 1931: Hamilton West Death of Frederick Thomas Smye
Party	Candidate	Votes	%	±%
Conservative	D'Arcy Argue Counsell Martin	5,768	52.00	–23.93
Labour	Elmore Philpott	5,325	48.00	–
Total valid votes		11,093	100.00	
Total rejected ballots		–		
Turnout		11,093	–	–
Eligible voters				
Conservative hold		Swing		–23.93

=== 1930 Ontario Liberal Party Leadership Contest ===
Candidate	Votes	%
Mitchell Hepburn	427	81.5
Elmore Philpott	97	18.5
Total	524	100.0

Parliament of Canada
Preceded by Arthur Laing	MP for Vancouver South; 1953–1957	Succeeded by Ernest James Broome
