= Tom McEwen (politician) =

Canadian trade unionist and Communist leader

- Born: Thomas Alexander McEwen; February 11, 1891; Stonehaven, Scotland
- Died: May 11, 1988 (aged 97)
- Occupations: Blacksmith, trade unionist, politician
- Political party: Communist Party of Canada
- Other political affiliations: Labor-Progressive Party; Socialist Party of Canada
- Spouse: Isobel Taylor (1910-1920)
- Children: 4
- Parent: 2

Thomas Alexander McEwen (February 11, 1891 – May 11, 1988) was a Canadian labour organizer and Communist politician.

== Early life ==
McEwen was born in Stonehaven, Scotland, south of Aberdeen, to Agnes and Alex McEwen. His father fought and died in the Boer War, several years after his mother died of tuberculosis. McEwen was raised by a guardian, Annie Wishart, until he was nine when he went to live with his aunt and uncle in the fishing village of Catterline.

When he was 13, he left the village for Aberdeen to find work, first as a baggageman on the Great North of Scotland Railway, then working with horses as a hostler and variously as a farmhand before apprenticing as a blacksmith.

At 19, McEwen married Isobel Taylor and, following the birth of their first child, emigrated to Canada in May 1912 where he began his career as a blacksmith in Moren, Manitoba. The family moved to Winnipeg the next year where McEwen joined the Blacksmiths and Horseshoers union and then to Swift Current, Saskatchewan in 1914.

The family grew to include two daughters and two sons by 1920 when Isabel died in the Spanish Flu epidemic.

== Career in left politics ==
McEwen joined the Socialist Party of Canada in 1920. In the fall of that year the family moved to Saskatoon, Saskatchewan where McEwen joined the Saskatoon Workers Party which subsequently became a branch of the newly formed Communist Party of Canada. McEwen was branch secretary and leader until 1927 when he moved to Winnipeg to work full-time as the party's organizer for Manitoba and Saskatchewan. In 1929, he moved to Toronto to become the party's industrial director.

He helped form the Workers' Unity League and became its general secretary. The WUL was the Communist Party's "red union" centre and focussed on organizing and building revolutionary industrial unions. At its height the WUL consisted of 40,000 workers organized in the mining, lumber, fishery, textile and hotel industries amongst others. In 1930, McEwen led a WUL delegation to Ottawa where he met Prime Minister R.B. Bennett to demand the institution of a system of Unemployment Insurance. Bennett refused, saying "Never will I or any government which I am a part, put a premium on idleness or put our people on the dole." In 1935, McEwen was a lead organizer of the On-to-Ottawa Trek of unemployed people which was violently broken up in Regina, Saskatchewan.

In 1931, McEwen and seven other leading Communists were arrested following a raid of the national offices of the Communist Party of Canada and the WUL were raided. The eight, including Communist Party leader Tim Buck were sentenced to five years in Kingston Penitentiary for being members of an organization declared illegal under Section 98 of the Criminal Code. They were freed in 1934 following a campaign for their release.

McEwen was chosen by the Communist Party in 1938 to go to Moscow and work for the Communist International for a two-year term. Upon his return to Canada in 1940 he was arrested under the Defence of Canada Regulations and charged for “continuing to be a member of the Communist Party", which had again been declared illegal as a result of World War II. He was sentenced to two years less a day of hard labour in the Manitoba provincial jail at Headley, Manitoba. He was ordered released in 1941 but was then detained under the orders of the federal government and interned with other Communists at a detention camp in Hull, Quebec.

Internments ended by 1943 after the Soviet Union became an ally as a result of Germany's invasion of the USSR. The banned Communist Party was permitted to reorganize itself as the Labor-Progressive Party. For the 1945 federal election, the party sent McEwen to the Yukon to be its candidate. The Liberal riding association was concerned that McEwen could win and opted not to run a candidate in Yukon riding and instead supported Conservative George Black. The local unions supported McEwen and the LPP's platform of support for collective bargaining, family allowance, old age pensions, workers’ compensation and equality for “Indians and Eskimos.” McEwen won 32% of the vote, coming within 162 votes of being elected.

Subsequently, McEwen moved to Vancouver, British Columbia where he was appointed editor of the party's west coast newspaper, the Pacific Tribune, which he edited until his retirement in 1970. In 1974, he published his autobiography, The Forge Glows Red.

== Electoral record ==
1963 Canadian federal election: Vancouver South
Party	Candidate	Votes	%	±%
Liberal	Arthur Laing	19,140	45.07	+8.63
New Democratic	Cliff Greer	9,649	22.72	+0.02
Progressive Conservative	J. Ferguson Browne	9,374	22.07	-7.73
Social Credit	Earl Backman	3,960	9.32	-0.50
Communist	Thomas A. McEwen	345	0.81	-0.41
Total valid votes		42,468		
Liberal hold		Swing		+4.30

1962 Canadian federal election: Vancouver East
Party	Candidate	Votes	%	±%
New Democratic	Harold Edward Winch	12,329	54.35	+5.79
Liberal	Marino Culos	4,447	19.60	+10.41
Progressive Conservative	Oris Kirk	3,395	14.97	-21.62
Social Credit	Michael John McCann	1,867	8.23	+2.57
Communist	Thomas Alexander McEwen	648	2.86	–
Total valid votes		22,686		
New Democratic hold		Swing		-2.31

1958 Canadian federal election: Vancouver South
Party	Candidate	Votes	%	±%
Progressive Conservative	Ernest James Broome	22,292	60.46	+15.60
Liberal	Elmore Philpott	6,528	17.70	-3.44
Co-operative Commonwealth	Cliff Greer	5,717	15.50	+1.96
Social Credit	Hilliard Beyerstein	1,914	5.19	-12.98
Labor–Progressive	Thomas A. McEwen	422	1.14	-1.14
Total valid votes		36,873	100.0	
Progressive Conservative hold		Swing		+9.52

1957 Canadian federal election: Vancouver South
Party	Candidate	Votes	%	±%
Progressive Conservative	Ernest James Broome	16,058	44.86	+27.41
Liberal	Elmore Philpott	7,568	21.14	-15.46
Social Credit	Hilliard Beyerstein	6,505	18.17	-5.16
Co-operative Commonwealth	Cliff Greer	4,849	13.55	-6.09
Labor–Progressive	Thomas A. McEwen	817	2.28	-0.70
Total valid votes		35,797	100.0	
Progressive Conservative gain from Liberal		Swing		+21.44

1953 Canadian federal election: Coast—Capilano
Party	Candidate	Votes	%	±%
Liberal	James Sinclair	13,614	45.88	-29.61
Social Credit	Ernest Gustav Silverton	7,092	23.90	–
Co-operative Commonwealth	Robert Bryce	5,361	18.07	-12.79
Progressive Conservative	Arthur Archibald McArthur	2,936	9.89	-13.37
Labor–Progressive	Thomas Alexander McEwen	673	2.27	–
Total valid votes		29,676		
Liberal hold		Swing		-26.76

1952 British Columbia general election: North Vancouver
Party	Candidate	Votes	%
Liberal	Martin Elliott Sowden	6,695	29.38
Co-operative Commonwealth	Dorothy Steeves	6,268	27.50
Social Credit	George Henry Tomlinson (Jr.)	4,947	21.71
Progressive Conservative	Arthur Archibald McArthur	4,061	17.82
Christian Democratic	Mary Freda Ennis	341	1.50
Labor-Progressive	Tom McEwen	263	1.15
Independent	John Howard Fletcher	216	0.95
Total valid votes		22,791	97.56
Total rejected ballots		571	2.44
Turnout		23,362	

1949 Canadian federal election: Burnaby—Richmond
Party	Candidate	Votes	%
Liberal	Tom Goode	12,848	38.87
Co-operative Commonwealth	Dorothy Gretchen Steeves	12,553	37.97
Progressive Conservative	John Ferguson	6,097	18.44
Labor–Progressive	Tom McEwen	1,558	4.71
Total valid votes		33,056	

1945 British Columbia general election: Comox
Party	Candidate	Votes	%	±%
Coalition	Herbert John Welch	3,432	45.62	–
Co-operative Commonwealth	Colin Cameron	3,362	44.69	-0.62
Labor-Progressive	Tom McEwen	729	9.69	–
Total valid votes		7,523	97.84	
Total rejected ballots		166	2.16	
Turnout		7,689		
Coalition gain		Swing		

1945 Canadian federal election: Yukon
Party	Candidate	Votes	%	±%
Progressive Conservative	George Black	849	41.19	-12.38
Labor–Progressive	Tom McEwen	687	33.33	–
Co-operative Commonwealth	Clive Hunter Cunningham	584	28.34	–
Total valid votes		2,061	100.0	
Progressive Conservative hold		Swing		-22.86
