= Equitable =

== Companies ==
- Equitable Life of Canada, a Canadian based mutual company providing Insurance, Investments, and Group Benefits
- Equitable Motion Picture Company, an early motion picture production company that merged in 1916 with the World Film Company
- Scottish Equitable, is an investment company located in Edinburgh
- Equitable PCI Bank
- The Equitable Life Assurance Society, life insurance company in the United Kingdom
- Equitable Holdings, formerly The Equitable Life Assurance Society of the United States and formerly AXA Equitable Life Insurance Company
- Equitable Securities Company, acquired by SunTrust Banks in 1997

== Legal ==
- Equity (law)
- Equitable remedy
- Equitable servitude
- Equitable distribution
- Equitable tolling
- Equitable conversion
- Equitable ownership (beneficiary)
- Equitable score control

== See also ==
- Equitable Building (disambiguation)
- Equitation
- Equity (disambiguation)
