= Equitable Life =

Equitable Life may refer to:

- The Equitable Life Assurance Society, a life insurance company in the United Kingdom
- Equitable Holdings formerly AXA Equitable Life Insurance Company and The Equitable Life Assurance Society of the United States
- Equitable Life Insurance Company, Canadian life insurance company

== See also ==
- Equitable Life Building (disambiguation)
