= Oswald J. Smith =

Canadian pastor and author

Oswald Jeffrey Smith (November 8, 1889 – January 25, 1986) was a Canadian pastor, author, and missions advocate. He founded The Peoples Church in Toronto in 1928.

Smith attended the Toronto Bible Training School, the Manitoba Presbyterian College in Winnipeg, and the McCormick Seminary in Chicago. Smith was ordained as a minister of the Presbyterian Church of Canada in 1918. However, he resigned from the Presbyterian Church, set up his own church in Toronto, which merged with a small Christian and Missionary Alliance congregation in 1921. In 1928, he started another independent church in Toronto, the Peoples Church. Using his base in Toronto for fundraising, he traveled the world to recruit missionaries.

Over the course of eighty years he preached more than 12,000 sermons in 80 countries, wrote thirty-five books (with translations into 128 languages), as well as 1,200 poems, of which 100 have been set to music, including "Deeper and Deeper" (first line "Into the heart of Jesus").

Paul B. Smith was the son of Oswald J. Smith, and Senior Pastor of The Peoples Church from 1959–1994.

== Early years ==
Smith was born on November 8, 1889, near Odessa, Ontario, as the eldest of the ten children of Benjamin and Alice Smith. His early years were troubled by ill health and a delicate constitution. He was once out of school for two whole years after a bout of pneumonia. He said, "It was generally accepted that I hadn't many more days on this earth." In spite of dire predictions, he did survive frightening illnesses and grew into a young manhood. On January 28, 1906, during a Torrey Crusade in Toronto, Smith committed his life to the Lord and from that time, his burning desire to preach the gospel became the focus of his life. Smith said, "I know as sure as I'm alive, I must preach the gospel. There's nothing else in the world for me."

Because of his early dedication to spreading the gospel, Smith offered himself several times for missionary service but his frail health prevented his acceptance. Deeply disappointed, he set about gaining more training and experience.

In 1908 he visited the lumber camps, the scattered settlements and Indian villages in the far interior of British Columbia (B.C.) and served as home missionary in other frontier areas of Canada. The hardships he encountered gave him a deep compassion for missionaries and this appreciation showed in his lifelong understanding of their difficulties.

During the summer of 1913 he ministered as a home missionary in Cawood, Kentucky where "God saw fit to give him many souls." It was during that time of service, far from home, that he wrote his "three fold dedication:"

1. I will think no thought, speak no word, and do no deed unworthy of a follower of Jesus Christ.
2. I will give my life for service in any part of the world and in any capacity God wills that I should labour.
3. I shall endeavour to do God's will from moment to moment as He reveals it to me.

He prepared for further ministry by study. In 1912 he graduated from Toronto Bible college and in 1915 from McCormick Seminary in Chicago. As part of his ordination service by the Chicago Presbytery, Smith's song "Deeper and Deeper" was sung.

== Missionary vision ==
Smith, who was considered too frail to be a missionary made a commitment: "If I can't go myself, I will send someone else."

Since no opportunity opened for foreign service, Smith began to see that he could evangelize others who might go in his stead. He was gaining confidence as a speaker; he had spoken at numerous youth meetings and during his Chicago years had served effectively as student pastor in two different Presbyterian churches. as assistant pastor at Rev. Morrow's Dale Presbyterian church, he prayed and believed for revival. It was at this time that he wrote "A Revival Hymn" that has remained popular during the years. Even in those early years the evangelization of the world was the supreme challenge of his life. "Missionary work does not belong to any one organization, it is the work of the whole church," he maintained.

Oswald J. Smith and Daisy Billings were married on September 12, 1916, at Dale Presbyterian Church where she was a deaconess and he the assistant pastor. Daisy was considered the gracious and generous helpmate who made possible Smith's dedicated life. She was the one who "held the ropes," "tarried by the stuff," sublimating her career to his. In later years, when their children were grown, she often joined Smith on his travels until her death in 1972.

Smith said "intercessory prayer is not only the highest form of Christian service, but also the hardest kind of work." He believed in having a regular time and place for prayer and paced as he prayed to prevent distractions. Every decision of his life was guided by prayer. More than anything he wanted to be used of God. He prayed, "Lord, use me..." "What must I do?" He prayed to be a victorious, Spirit-filled man of prayer, a surrendered man of the word, and of one purpose.

From the Bible, Smith found the qualifications which he lists in his book "The Man God Uses." Prayer was a major component. In the book Smith says, "Prevailing prayer, prayer of travail such as Jesus knew, will lead to God being glorified in your ministry."

== Church planting ==
Besides his work in Toronto, Vancouver, and a year as Superintendent of the Alliance Church in Canada, Smith left for Los Angeles in 1927 as minister of the Gospel Tabernacle, another Alliance church.

In 1928 he felt strongly that his call was to Toronto and the family drove back the 3000 miles in a new Nash car. Smith explained: "I knew I wasn't in the right place...I wanted to serve God, and serve Him in the place He would have me. It's that simple."

Several buildings and locations followed as his vision of an interdenominational church dedicated to missions and worship developed. In 1930, the then Toronto Gospel Tabernacle was located at 42 Gerrard Street East in the former St. James Square Presbyterian Church. In 1933, Smith renamed it "The Peoples Church", and in 1934 the congregation moved to 100 Bloor Street East, where they remained until the move to Sheppard Avenue in 1962. In 1943, Peter W. Philpott, who had earlier founded what became the Associated Gospel Churches of Canada, was appointed Smith's associate minister, occupying the post for almost a decade.

Smith's travels and ministries multiplied. During his life he made 21 world tours promoting evangelism and world missions. One of the results of his visit to the Baltic countries was the establishment of a Bible School in Riga for the express purpose of training local missionaries. Their success in evangelizing their own people proved to him their value. While leading his expanding congregation in a program supporting over 500 workers worldwide, Smith was instrumental in challenging others to follow his example.

== Champion of the Faith ==
Smith considered training and education for the ministry essential. He himself read and was influenced by many prominent Protestants: Wesley, Luther, Spurgeon, Moody, Finney, and Brainerd, the "man of prayer." Others, in turn, were encouraged by him and his single-minded focus.

When Smith died on January 25, 1986, the accolades poured in. For example, Billy Graham said:

"I've lost a dear friend, the man who had more impact on my life than any other - a great preacher, a great songwriter, a man who stands equal with Moody and Torrey. As a Missionary Statesman he stands alone. There was no equal."

Also, the Revell Company said:

"There is fire in his bones. Those who have heard him have seen fire in his heart, his eyes, his speech - a fire which has lept out to set them afire."

== Literature ==
Throughout his life, Smith believed greatly in the printed page. He was the author of 35 books, printed in many languages. These books, such as "Passion for Souls," "The Man God Uses," and "The Enduement of Power" have changed lives and encouraged thousands of readers. Billy Graham said, "His books have been used of the Holy Spirit to sear into the very depths of my soul and have had a tremendous influence on my personal life."

As an editor, Smith published a magazine for 50 years. He also wrote innumerable pamphlets and tracts. On one occasion, Smith said that he may have "accomplished more by" his "books than any other way."

== Emphases ==
Music always played a major role in Smith's ministry and the continuing program of The Peoples Church. One of Smith's first moves when starting a new work was to have a capable music director so that a choir and orchestra would balance the program of evangelistic preaching. Smith felt that the music would not only be a form of worship in itself but set the tone for the service and encourage the speakers. Furthermore, Smith wrote 1200 hymns, poems, and gospel songs.

Smith's emphasis on faith included his approach to financial giving, "The Faith Promise Offering." He felt that most Christians would respond to a promise between themselves and God. They would be asked to make it in complete dependency that God would undertake. He was known for saying, "Cash isn't needed. In dependence upon God, I will endeavour to give. No one will ask you for it - it's between you and God." Then he would call to sing "Step Out in Faith" as the money envelopes poured in with financial gifts. Sacrificial giving was encouraged as well as early habits of giving something regularly, no matter how small. Second or third gifts were called envelopes of repentance. Smith was also known for saying, "I know people who have two pairs of shoes!" People often "gave up" something to give to world missions.

== Last years ==
Smith resigned as minister of the Peoples Church in favor of his son Paul on January 1, 1959; however, he retained the position of Minister of Missions and remained actively involved in church work. He died on January 25, 1986.

== See also ==
- Fundamentalist Christianity in Canada

== Works ==
- Give Ye Them To Eat, Chicago: Russian Missionary Society (1918)
- Voice of Hope, Toronto: Evangelical Publishers (1919)
- Thou Art The Man, Toronto: Evangelical Publishers (1919)
- Songs in the Night, Toronto: Alliance Tabernacle (1922)
- The Baptism with the Holy Spirit, New York: Christian Alliance Pub. Co. (1925)
- From Death to Life, New York: Christian Alliance Pub. Co. (1925)
- The Revival We Need, New York: Christian Alliance Pub. Co. (1925)
- Back to the Pentecost, New York: Christian Alliance Pub. Co. (1926)
- Working With God, Toronto: Tabernacle Publishers (1926)
- Is the Antichrist at Hand?, Toronto: Tabernacle Publishers (1926)
- The Spirit-Filled Life, New York: Christian Alliance Pub. Co. (1927)
- The Great Physician, New York: Christian Alliance Pub. Co. (1927)
- Under a Pirate Flag and Other Stories, Chicago: Worldwide Christian Couriers (1928)
- The Man God Uses, New York: Christian Alliance Pub. Co. (1932)
- The Enduement of Power, London: Marshall, Morgan & Scott (1933)
- The Work God Blesses, London: Marshall, Morgan & Scott (1934)
- The Clouds are Lifting, London: Marshall, Morgan & Scott (1936)
- The Marvels of Grace, London, Marshall, Morgan & Scott (1945)
- The Challenge of Life, London: Marshall, Morgan & Scott (1946)
- The Voice of Prophecy, London: Marshall, Morgan & Scott (1948)
- The Gospel We Preach, London, Marshall, Morgan & Scott (1949)
- The Passion for Souls, London: Marshall, Morgan & Scott (1950)
- The Country I Love Best, London: Marshall, Morgan & Scott (1951)
- The Battle for Truth, London: Marshall, Morhan & Scott (1953)
- The Consuming Fire, London: Marshall, Morgan & Scott (1954)
- The Day of Salvation, London, Marshall, Morgan & Scott (1955)
- The Things We Know, London: Marshall, Morgan & Scott (1957)
- The Challenge of Missions, London: Marshall, Morgan & Scott (1959)
- The Cry of the World, London: Marshall, Morgan & Scott (1959)
- The Tales of the Mission Field
