= Peter Wiley Philpott =

Canadian Christian fundamentalist and evangelist (1865–1957)

Reverend Peter Wiley Philpott
- Philpott c. 1925
- Born: 25 November 1865; Iona, Ontario
- Died: 1 April 1957 (aged 91); Toronto
- Burial place: Hamilton, Ontario
- Occupations: blacksmith, Salvation Army officer, minister
- Years active: 1892–1956
- Known for: Founding the United Christian Workers (1892) (Note: Renamed the Christian Workers' Church in 1922, and in 1925, the Associated Gospel Churches of Canada.)
- Spouse: Jessie Menzies
- Children: 13, including Elmore Philpott
- Religion: Christian
- Church: Associated Gospel Churches
- Ordained: 30 September 1892 by Christian & Missionary Alliance
- Congregations served: Philpott Tabernacle, Hamilton.; Moody Church, Chicago.; Church of the Open Door, Los Angeles.; Jarvis Street Baptist Church and Peoples Church, Toronto.
- Offices held: Brigadier, Salvation Army.; Superintendent for Western Canada, Christian & Missionary Alliance.; President, United Christian Workers.

Peter Wiley Philpott (1865–1957), a Canadian Christian fundamentalist and evangelist, founded the United Christian Workers, a working-class religious movement later known as the Associated Gospel Churches of Canada.

== Biography ==
=== Early life ===
Philpott was born in 1865 on a farm in Elgin County, Ontario. He attended grammar school till the age of 13, and was then apprenticed to a blacksmith in Chatham for a few years.

=== Salvation Army ===
He joined the Salvation Army in 1884 after experiencing a religious conversion at an Army rally in Dresden, Ontario, where he was mainly raised. The Army had recently formed a congregation there.

Philpott rose to the high rank of brigadier, and was appointed a member of the Canadian Commissioner's advisory committee. He married Jessie Menzies, a fellow Army officer, in 1887; they went on to have 13 children.

=== United Christian Workers ===
In 1892, after a prolonged and public dispute focused on congregational autonomy, Philpott resigned from the Army, precipitating a significant secession of officers and soldiers. The secessionists created a new religious organization, the United Christian Workers, with Philpott its elected president.

Later that same year, Philpott was ordained by the Christian & Missionary Alliance, and went on to establish congregations of Christian Workers in Hamilton and Toronto. The Hamilton church was known as the Gospel Mission; migrant Scottish steelworkers were a significant part of its congregation.

In 1896, Philpott became minister of the Hamilton church, a position he held till 1922. He changed its name to the Gospel Tabernacle, and organised the construction of a large new church that opened in 1906 (it was renamed the Philpott Tabernacle in 1926). A 1903 Hamilton newspaper referred to the Christian Workers as:

[A] religious body without pope, primate, metropolitan, bishop or president. Each branch is self-governed, self-supported; it settles all matters for itself. There is no creed, dogma or confession of faith to perplex the members, who appear to be well satisfied, and are doing much good in the places where branches have been established – not only doing much good individually, but adding to their membership and erecting churches, "to which everybody is heartily welcome".

While ministering in Hamilton, he remained affiliated with the Christian & Missionary Alliance, serving successively as its superintendent for Western Canada (1899–1900) and associate superintendent for Eastern Canada (1901–1902).

=== Moody Church and Church of the Open Door ===
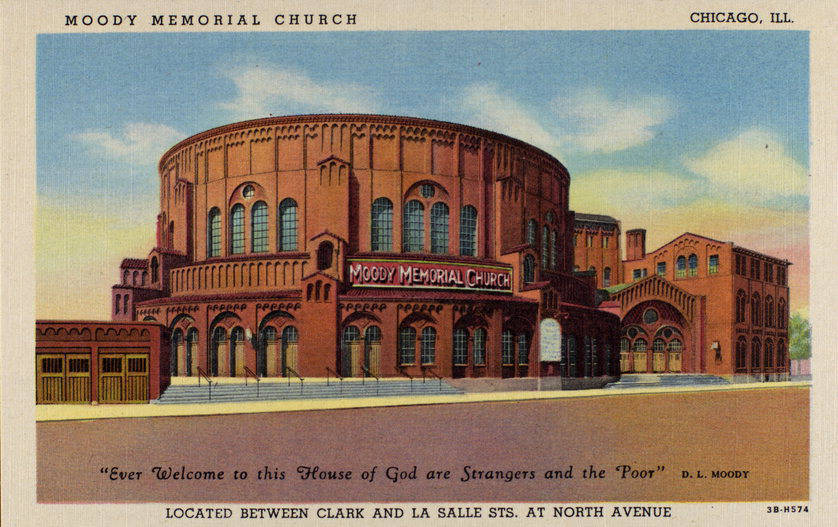
The Moody Memorial Church constructed during Philpott's 1922–1929 pastorship. Curt Teich postcard, 1943

From 1922 to 1929, Philpott was pastor of the Moody Church in Chicago, overseeing the construction of a massive new church building as a memorial to Dwight Moody.

In October 1929, he became the third pastor of the Church of the Open Door in Los Angeles, resigning, due to ill-health, in October 1931. On many occasions thereafter, he spoke during services at the church, including in 1956, when he was ninety.

=== Later life ===
After retiring in 1932, Philpott settled in Toronto, where he sometimes filled in for Thomas Shields at Jarvis Street Baptist Church. In 1943, he was appointed associate minister at Oswald Smith's Peoples Church. He made extensive speaking tours throughout North America until a few years before he died in 1957.

== Views and beliefs ==
=== Labour ===
In 1916, when minister of the Gospel Tabernacle in Hamilton, Philpott was one of several clergymen, together with the mayor and other officials, in a mediation committee trying to avert a strike by unionised machinists. Along with other ministers, he expressed sympathy for the machinists, commenting that while they, as employees, had made many concessions in negotiations, their employers had made none.

Draper (2003), drawing on Philpott's sermons and articles, observes that Philpott made many references to the importance of "honest toil and labouring" and saw "all of life as a 'service' to God". Draper adds that the vocabulary of the Christian Workers made considerable reference to waged employment in its metaphors and imagery.

Draper also states that Philpott's self-identification as a "blacksmith preacher" persistently framed his discourse as a pastor, quoting, as an example, this anecdote from a sermon he delivered in 1921:

One day a clergyman in this city called to see a man and wife and asked why they did not come to his Church, which was nearby. They said, "We go to the Tabernacle to hear Philpott." He said, "You go up there to hear that man! Why do you not go to a real Church?" "Why? What is the matter there? Is there anything wrong?" "Well," the clergyman replied, "if you were going to call a doctor, you would call in a real doctor would you not? You would not call in a quack." "Well," said my friend, "There are a lot of sick sinners being saved up there." "Yes, but look at that man. He is not a preacher at all. He is just a blacksmith." I sometimes think I spoiled a pretty good blacksmith to make a poor preacher. His wife could not stand it any longer, and said, "Well, Jesus was a carpenter, and I guess they make a pretty good pair," and she left the room.

=== Immigrants ===
In early 1920, Philpott appeared before Hamilton's board of education to appeal for "support in the work of educating the many foreigners in the city". He referred to ongoing, volunteer-run classes where "the aliens were being taught the principles of Canadian citizenship", of whose "morals and standards", he stated, they were "densely ignorant."

His intervention came amidst debates in Hamilton about how best to "Canadianize" (assimilate) its many immigrants. Failing to win over the board of education, he turned to the city's newly established chamber of commerce, which secured funding for English-language evening classes.

=== Fundamentalism ===
Philpott was a speaker at the 1919 World Conference on Christian Fundamentals. In his presentation, he said that critics of the Bible should be ignored, and asserted the importance of conversion and a Keswickian approach to living a more holy life.

He belonged to the World's Christian Fundamentals Association, which advocated premillennialism and creationism. At its seventh annual convention in 1923, along with the American politician William J. Bryan, the Canadian fundamentalist leader Thomas Shields, and others, he signed a statement of fundamentalist principles that concluded:

The time has come when Fundamentalists and Modernists should no longer remain in the same fold, for how can two walk together except they be agreed? Therefore we call up upon all Fundamentalists of all denominations to possess their souls with holy boldness and challenge every false teacher, whether he be professor in a denominational school or state school; whether he be editor of a religious publication or the secretary of a denominational board; and whether he be a pastor in a pulpit in the homeland or a missionary on the foreign field.

Pietsch (2015) labels Philpott a "dispensational modernist" – someone who did not view the Bible as literally true, but saw it as a text requiring methodical, systematic analysis and interpretation in order to reveal its meaning. He notes that Philpott, addressing a conference on biblical prophecy in 1918, insisted that the dates of the end times and the Second Advent could not be accurately known, and that this necessitated the scanning of current events for signs to help gauge the closeness of the end:

Now, it is not only our privilege but it is our duty to read in the light of prophecy the events that are now transpiring. ... Let us keep in mind that while we cannot fix a date for His appearing, yet the Scriptures gives us approximate signs of the end of this age – I say approximate, mark you – because I believe that they enable us only to approximate – certainly not to calculate – the time of the end. ... [W]e might classify [the signs] as Political, Commercial, Social, Moral, Spiritual, and National or Jewish[.]

== Works ==
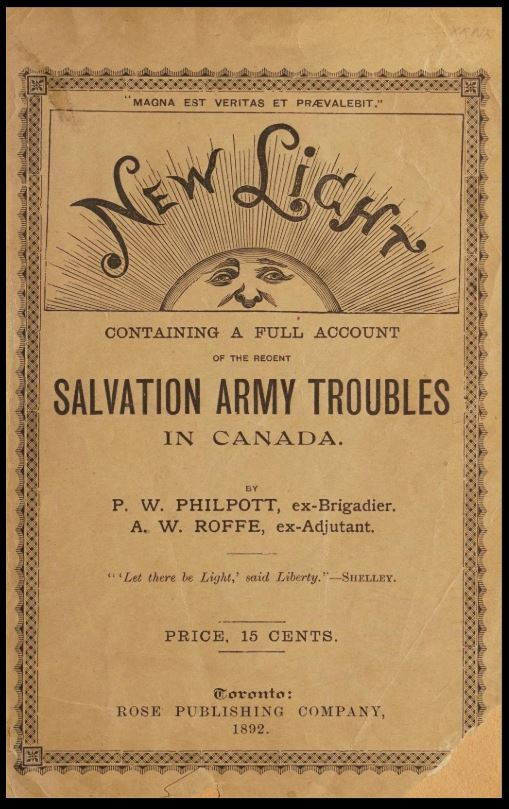
Front cover of Philpott and Roffe's 1892 account of the circumstances leading up to their resignations from the Salvation Army

- New Light: Containing a Full Account of the Recent Salvation Army Troubles in Canada. Toronto: Rose Publishing Company. 1892. OCLC 8444697. An account of the circumstances leading up to Philpott's resignation from the Salvation Army. (Note: Co-authored with A. W. Roffe, who also resigned.)
- "Coming Events Cast Their Shadows Before". Light on Prophecy; Being the Proceedings and Addresses at the Philadelphia Prophetic Conference. New York: Christian Herald. 1918. pp. 193–211. OCLC 4561184. Describes political, spiritual, and other signs of the Second Advent. A second address, "Will There Be Any Tears in Heaven, and Why?", pp. 233–241, analyses the concept of the Last Judgment.
- Enter the Inner Circle. Toronto: Evangelical Publishers. 1919. ISBN 978-0-659-90971-8. OCLC 66004181. A short homily on relationships between Jesus and his followers and apostles.
- "The Witness of Human Experience to the Inspiration of the Word". God Hath Spoken: Twenty-five Addresses Delivered at the World Conference on Christian Fundamentals. Philadelphia: Bible Conference Committee. 1919. pp. 109–122. OCLC 1059107. Asserts that personal experience of conversion cannot be reasoned against or argued away.
- Is Healing in the Atonement of Christ? Chicago: Bible Institute Colportage Association. c. 1920. OCLC 78391810 Discusses the connection between physical healing and the Christian concept of atonement.
- Is God Still Speaking to Men? and Other Addresses. New York: Fleming H. Revell Company. 1930. OCLC 10773482. A collection of sermons.
- Sixty Wonderful Years. Los Angeles: Bible House of Los Angeles. 1946. OCLC 709793623. In this short booklet, Philpott describes his own religious conversion and how he converted others.

== See also ==
- Associated Gospel Churches of Canada – Canadian evangelical Christian denomination
- Christian fundamentalism – Religious movement emphasizing biblical literalism
- Fundamentalist Christianity in Canada
- Moody Church – Evangelical Christian church in Chicago, Illinois, US
- Salvation Army – Christian denomination and charity
