= Thomas Henry Goode =

Canadian politician

Member of Parliament for Burnaby—Richmond
- In office 9 September 1968 – 1 September 1972
- Preceded by: Bob Prittie
- Succeeded by: John Reynolds

Personal details
- Born: 25 November 1933 Burnaby, British Columbia, Canada
- Died: 28 May 1994 (aged 60)
- Party: Liberal
- Spouse(s): Ingeborg Rose Trune Wagner (m. 24 February 1960)
- Parent: Tom Goode (father)
- Profession: builder, developer, teacher

Thomas Henry Goode (25 November 1933 – 28 May 1994) was a Liberal party member of the House of Commons of Canada. He was born in Burnaby, British Columbia and became a builder, developer and teacher by career.

Goode attended the University of British Columbia and the Vancouver Teacher Training College. His father, Tom Goode, previously represented the same electoral district from 1949 to 1957.

He was first elected at the Burnaby—Richmond riding in the 1968 general election. After serving his only term, the 28th Canadian Parliament, Goode was defeated in the 1972 election by John Reynolds of the Progressive Conservative party.

Goode then became Mayor of Delta, British Columbia from 1973 to 1979. He died on 28 May 1994 due to cancer.
