= Burnaby—Richmond =

Former federal electoral district in British Columbia, Canada

British Columbia electoral district
- Boundaries at abolition

Defunct federal electoral district
- Legislature: House of Commons
- District created: 1949
- District abolished: 1976
- First contested: 1949
- Last contested: 1978

Burnaby—Richmond (also known as Burnaby—Richmond—Delta) was a federal electoral district in British Columbia, Canada, that was represented in the House of Commons of Canada from 1949 to 1979. This riding was created as "Burnaby—Richmond" in 1947 from parts of New Westminster and Vancouver North ridings.

The name of the electoral district was changed in 1970 to "Burnaby—Richmond—Delta". It was abolished in 1976 when it was redistributed into Burnaby and Richmond—South Delta ridings.

== Historical boundaries ==
1952 representation order

1966 representation order

== Members of Parliament ==
Parliament	Years	Member	Party
Burnaby—Richmond; Riding created from New Westminster and Vancouver North
21st	1949–1953	Tom Goode	Liberal
22nd	1953–1957	Tom Goode	Liberal
23rd	1957–1958	Thomas Irwin	Social Credit
24th	1958–1962	John Drysdale	Progressive Conservative
25th	1962–1963	Bob Prittie	New Democratic
26th	1963–1965	Bob Prittie	New Democratic
27th	1965–1968	Bob Prittie	New Democratic
28th	1968–1972	Thomas Henry Goode	Liberal
Burnaby—Richmond—Delta
29th	1972–1974	John Reynolds	Progressive Conservative
30th	1974–1977	John Reynolds	Progressive Conservative
30th	1978–1979	Tom Siddon	Progressive Conservative
Riding dissolved into Burnaby and Richmond—South Delta

== Election results ==
Canadian federal by-election, October 16, 1978: Burnaby—Richmond—Delta On the resignation of John Reynolds, September 5, 1977
Party	Candidate	Votes	%	±%
Progressive Conservative	Tom Siddon	30,395	63.48	+8.67
New Democratic	Mercia Stickney	11,308	23.62	+7.33
Liberal	Tony Schmand	4,713	9.84	–18.47
None	Ernie Lecours	1,128	2.36	–
Communist	Homer Stevens	339	0.71	+0.23
Total valid votes		47,883	100.00	
Total rejected ballots		–		
Turnout		47,883	–	–
Eligible voters		–		
Progressive Conservative hold		Swing		+13.57
Source: Library of Parliament

1974 Canadian federal election: Burnaby—Richmond—Delta
Party	Candidate	Votes	%	±%
Progressive Conservative	John Reynolds	34,013	54.81	+19.14
Liberal	Joan Wallace	17,570	28.31	–1.31
New Democratic	J.-P. Daem	10,106	16.29	–16.79
Communist	Homer Stevens	299	0.48	–
Marxist–Leninist	Steve Ruthchinski	70	0.11	–
Total valid votes		62,058	99.80	
Total rejected ballots		122	0.20	–1.13
Turnout		62,180	75.02	–1.08
Eligible voters		82,889		
Progressive Conservative hold		Swing		+17.96
Source: Library of Parliament

1972 Canadian federal election: Burnaby—Richmond—Delta
Party	Candidate	Votes	%	±%
Progressive Conservative	John Reynolds	19,798	35.67	+22.47
New Democratic	Ken Novakowski	18,358	33.08	–4.87
Liberal	Thomas Henry Goode	16,441	29.62	–12.82
Social Credit	Gayle Dewhirst	906	1.63	–4.78
Total valid votes		55,503	98.68	
Total rejected ballots		745	1.32	–
Turnout		56,248	76.10	–
Eligible voters		73,914		
Progressive Conservative gain from Liberal		Swing		+13.67
Source: Library of Parliament

1968 Canadian federal election
Party	Candidate	Votes	%	±%
Liberal	Thomas Henry Goode	16,182	42.44	+10.88
New Democratic	Bob Prittie	14,470	37.95	–6.75
Progressive Conservative	Matt Phillips	5,035	13.20	+5.29
Social Credit	Jack Lubzinski	2,445	6.41	–9.42
Total valid votes		38,132	99.43	
Total rejected ballots		218	0.57	+0.02
Turnout		38,350	78.35	–0.03
Eligible voters		48,947		
Liberal gain from New Democratic		Swing		+8.81
Source: Library of Parliament

1965 Canadian federal election
Party	Candidate	Votes	%	±%
New Democratic	Bob Prittie	19,758	44.70	+6.67
Liberal	Emmet Cafferky	13,950	31.56	–4.15
Social Credit	J.F. Jack Lubzinski	6,999	15.83	+5.94
Progressive Conservative	T.A. Tom Horan	3,499	7.92	–8.46
Total valid votes		44,206	99.45	
Total rejected ballots		245	0.55	+0.18
Turnout		44,451	78.38	–4.93
Eligible voters		56,709		
New Democratic hold		Swing		+5.41
Source: Library of Parliament

1963 Canadian federal election
Party	Candidate	Votes	%	±%
New Democratic	Bob Prittie	16,578	38.03	–0.53
Liberal	William J. (Bill) Trainor	15,568	35.71	+7.31
Progressive Conservative	Philip S. Stannard	7,138	16.37	–5.06
Social Credit	Cyril Smith	4,312	9.89	–1.72
Total valid votes		43,596	99.63	
Total rejected ballots		162	0.37	–0.26
Turnout		43,758	83.32	+3.80
Eligible voters		52,520		
New Democratic hold		Swing		–3.92
Source: Library of Parliament

1962 Canadian federal election
Party	Candidate	Votes	%	±%
New Democratic	Bob Prittie	15,620	38.55	+9.05
Liberal	William J. (Bill) Trainor	11,509	28.41	+12.91
Progressive Conservative	John Drysdale	8,683	21.43	–24.22
Social Credit	Hilliard Beyerstein	4,705	11.61	+2.26
Total valid votes		40,517	99.37	
Total rejected ballots		255	0.63	+0.12
Turnout		40,772	79.52	+2.23
Eligible voters		51,272		
New Democratic gain from Progressive Conservative		Swing		–1.93
Source: Library of Parliament

1958 Canadian federal election
Party	Candidate	Votes	%	±%
Progressive Conservative	John Drysdale	15,570	45.65	+19.80
Co-operative Commonwealth	Bob Prittie	10,063	29.50	+4.56
Liberal	Tom Goode	5,286	15.50	–7.68
Social Credit	Thomas Irwin	3,190	9.35	–16.69
Total valid votes		34,109	99.49	
Total rejected ballots		175	0.51	–0.33
Turnout		34,284	77.29	+4.49
Eligible voters		44,357		
Progressive Conservative gain from Social Credit		Swing		+7.62
Source: Library of Parliament

1957 Canadian federal election
Party	Candidate	Votes	%	±%
Social Credit	Thomas Irwin	7,999	26.04	–4.82
Progressive Conservative	John Drysdale	7,940	25.85	–
Co-operative Commonwealth	Bob Prittie	7,662	24.94	–6.14
Liberal	Tom Goode	7,121	23.18	–11.02
Total valid votes		30,722	99.16	
Total rejected ballots		261	0.84	+0.39
Turnout		30,983	72.80	+7.92
Eligible voters		42,560		
Social Credit gain from Liberal		Swing		–15.33
Source: Library of Parliament

1953 Canadian federal election
Party	Candidate	Votes	%	±%
Liberal	Tom Goode	7,021	34.20	–4.67
Co-operative Commonwealth	Francis James McKenzie	6,381	31.08	–6.89
Social Credit	Clement F. Stelter	6,334	30.86	–
Labor–Progressive	Homer Stevens	792	3.86	–0.86
Total valid votes		20,528	99.55	
Total rejected ballots		93	0.45	–0.13
Turnout		20,621	64.88	–0.15
Eligible voters		31,784		
Liberal hold		Swing		+1.11
Source: Library of Parliament

1949 Canadian federal election
Party	Candidate	Votes	%	±%
Liberal	Tom Goode	12,848	38.87	–
Co-operative Commonwealth	Dorothy Steeves	12,553	37.98	–
Progressive Conservative	John Ferguson	6,097	18.44	–
Labor–Progressive	Tom McEwen	1,558	4.71	–
Total valid votes		33,056	99.42	
Total rejected ballots		192	0.58	–
Turnout		33,248	65.03	–
Eligible voters		51,125		
Liberal notional hold		Swing		–
This riding was created from parts of New Westminster and Vancouver North, which both elected Liberals in the previous election.
Source: Library of Parliament

== See also ==
- List of Canadian electoral districts
- Historical federal electoral districts of Canada
