= Richard Clive Cooper =

Canadian politician

Member of Parliament for Vancouver South
- In office 1917–1921
- Preceded by: none, first member
- Succeeded by: Leon Johnson Ladner

Personal details
- Born: December 31, 1881 Dublin, Ireland
- Died: March 10, 1940 (aged 58) Victoria, British Columbia, Canada
- Party: Unionist
- Spouse: Dorothy Mary Cooper
- Profession: soldier

Richard Clive Cooper (December 31, 1881 – March 10, 1940) was an Irish-Canadian soldier and Unionist politician. Cooper served in the First Matabele War and the Boer War. In 1914 he was assigned to serve overseas as a Major in the 7th Battalion, 1st Division, Canadian Expeditionary Force. Cooper represented Vancouver South in the House of Commons from 1917 to 1921.
