= John Reynolds (Canadian politician) =

Canadian politician (born 1942)

The Honourable John Reynolds PC
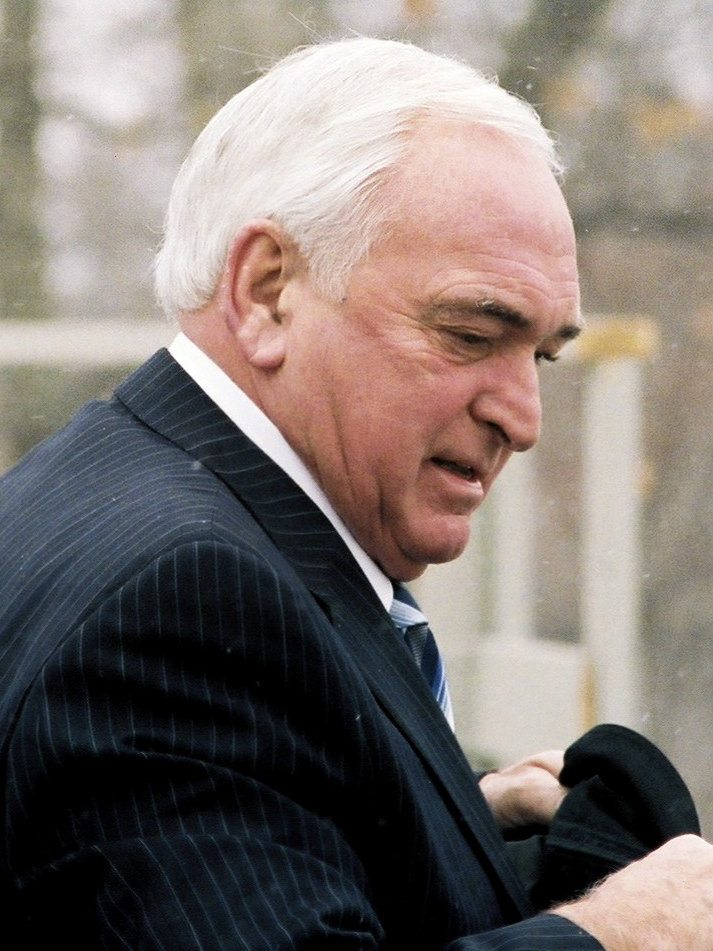
- Reynolds in 2006

Leader of the Opposition
- In office December 12, 2001 – May 20, 2002
- Preceded by: Stockwell Day
- Succeeded by: Stephen Harper

Interim leader of the Canadian Alliance
- In office December 11, 2001 – March 20, 2002
- Preceded by: Stockwell Day
- Succeeded by: Stephen Harper

28th Speaker of the Legislative Assembly of British Columbia
- In office March 9, 1987 – November 1, 1989
- Preceded by: Kenneth Walter Davidson
- Succeeded by: Stephen Rogers

Member of Parliament for West Vancouver—Sunshine Coast
- In office June 2, 1997 – January 23, 2006
- Preceded by: Herb Grubel
- Succeeded by: Blair Wilson

Member of the British Columbia Legislative Assembly for West Vancouver-Howe Sound
- In office May 5, 1983 – October 17, 1991
- Preceded by: Allan Williams
- Succeeded by: Jeremy Dalton

Member of Parliament for Burnaby—Richmond—Delta
- In office October 30, 1972 – May 9, 1977
- Preceded by: Tom Goode
- Succeeded by: Tom Siddon (1978)

Personal details
- Born: John Douglas Reynolds; January 19, 1942 (age 84) Toronto, Ontario, Canada
- Party: Conservative (2003-present); Canadian Alliance (2000-2003); Reform (1997-2000); Progressive Conservative (1972-1977)
- Other political affiliations: BC Social Credit
- Occupation: Businessman; manager; sales and marketing consultant

John Douglas Reynolds PC (born January 19, 1942) is a former Canadian politician. He was the member of Parliament for the riding of West Vancouver—Sunshine Coast—Sea to Sky Country in the House of Commons of Canada from 1997 to 2006 and a former Federal Opposition Leader. He had also been an MP in the 1970s as well as a provincial politician in British Columbia in the 1980s and 1990s.

== Career ==
He was first elected to Parliament as a candidate of the Progressive Conservatives in 1972 and was re-elected in 1974. He resigned in 1977 after a series of disagreements with Joe Clark.

Beginning in 1983, he was active in the Social Credit Party of British Columbia and served as speaker of the British Columbia Legislative Assembly and as a cabinet minister (Minister of Environment). In 1986, he was a candidate at the Social Credit leadership convention coming in fifth. He remained in provincial politics until 1991 when he was defeated in his bid for re-election.

Reynolds returned to parliament in 1997 as a Reform MP and served as Chief Opposition Whip. He remained in this role when the Reform Party was folded into the Canadian Alliance. When Stockwell Day faced a revolt in his caucus in 2001 and Chuck Strahl resigned as House leader, Reynolds was named in his place. When Day resigned as Alliance leader, Reynolds was chosen as interim party leader and leader of the opposition and served until Stephen Harper was elected the new party leader.

Reynolds resigned as House leader on January 24, 2005, but continued as MP for his riding until his retirement at the 2006 federal election. He was the coordinator of the Conservative campaign in British Columbia. On the day after the election, which resulted in a Conservative minority government, Harper asked Reynolds to approach Liberal minister David Emerson about crossing the floor and serving as a minister in Harper's government. Emerson eventually accepted the offer, which triggered a firestorm of criticism. However, Reynolds, who had strongly criticized Belinda Stronach's switch from the Conservatives to the Liberals, told a suburban Vancouver newspaper that he was "very happy" that Emerson was a Conservative and claimed that the people of Emerson's left-leaning Vancouver riding got the better end of the bargain. "Instead of having someone in opposition," he said, "they have someone who is a cabinet minister of a new government."

Reynolds supports the death penalty.

After his political career, in 2006 he accepted the role as Senior Strategic Advisor at McMillan LLP.

== Electoral record ==
2004 Canadian federal election: West Vancouver—Sunshine Coast—Sea to Sky Country
Party	Candidate	Votes	%	±%	Expenditures
Conservative	John Reynolds	21,372	35.29	-22.04	$81,933
Liberal	Blair Wilson	19,685	32.51	+5.91	$81,023
New Democratic	Nicholas Simons	13,156	21.72	+15.43	$29,779
Green	Andrea Goldsmith	5,887	9.72	+4.83	$28,167
Canadian Action	Marc Bombois	321	0.53	-1.30	$117
Marxist–Leninist	Anne Jamieson	123	0.20	–	
Total valid votes		60,544	100.0		
Total rejected ballots		139	0.23	-0.06	
Turnout		60,683	66.00	+2.81	
Conservative notional hold		Swing		-13.98	
Conservative change is from the combination of Progressive Conservative and Canadian Alliance vote.

2000 Canadian federal election: West Vancouver—Sunshine Coast
Party	Candidate	Votes	%	±%	Expenditures
Alliance	John Reynolds	25,546	47.96	+7.91	$65,492
Liberal	Ian McKay	14,169	26.60	-7.92	$60,517
Progressive Conservative	Kate Manvell	4,993	9.37	+1.01	$5,777
New Democratic	Telis Savvaidis	3,351	6.29	-5.64	$9,069
Green	Jane Bishop	2,605	4.89	+0.27	$3,816
Marijuana	Dana Larsen	1,618	3.03	–	
Canadian Action	Marc Bombois	976	1.83	–	$3,227
Total valid votes		53,258	100.0		
Total rejected ballots		155	0.29	-0.11	
Turnout		53,413	63.81	-2.99	
Alliance hold		Swing		+7.92	
Canadian Alliance change is based on the Reform Party vote.

1997 Canadian federal election: West Vancouver—Sunshine Coast
Party	Candidate	Votes	%	Expenditures
Reform	John Reynolds	20,092	40.05	$62,107
Liberal	Phil Boname	17,318	34.52	$62,278
New Democratic	Clark Banks	5,988	11.93	$9,548
Progressive Conservative	Dave Thomas	4,194	8.36	$36,317
Green	Lisa Barrett	2,318	4.62	$935
Natural Law	David Grayson	254	0.50	
Total valid votes		50,164	100.0	
Total rejected ballots		199	0.40	
Turnout		50,363	66.80	
This riding was created from parts of Capilano—Howe Sound and North Island—Powell River, both of which elected Reform candidates in the last election.

B.C. General Election 1991: West Vancouver-Capilano
Party	Candidate	Votes	%	±	Expenditures
Liberal	Jeremy Dalton	13,194	56.63%		$14,866
Social Credit	John Reynolds	6,161	26.44%	–	$95,863
NDP	Helen Chaplin	3,740	16.05%		$13,905
Green	Marcia Santen	140	0.60%	–	$100
Libertarian	Tunya Audain	65	0.28%		$20
Total valid votes		23,300	100.00%		
Total rejected ballots		343	1.45%		
Turnout		23,643	78.99%		

34th British Columbia election, 1986: West Vancouver-Howe Sound
Party	Candidate	Votes	%	±	Expenditures
Social Credit	John Reynolds	14,591	54.31%	–	unknown
Liberal	Ed Carlin	6,786	25.26%		unknown
New Democratic	David C. Manning	5,490	20.43%		unknown
Total valid votes		26,867	100.00%		
Total rejected ballots		265			
Turnout		%			

=== 1986 British Columbia Social Credit Party leadership convention ===
(Held on July 29–30, 1986.)

First Ballot:

- Bill Vander Zalm 367
- Grace McCarthy 244
- Bud Smith 202
- Brian Smith 196
- Jim Nielsen 54
- John Reynolds 54
- Stephen Rogers 43
- Bob Wenman 40
- Cliff Michael 32
- Bill Ritchie 28
- Mel Couvelier 20
- Kim Campbell 14

Second Ballot (Campbell eliminated, five others withdraw):

- Bill Vander Zalm 457
- Grace McCarthy 280
- Brian Smith 255
- Bud Smith 219
- John Reynolds 39
- Jim Nielsen 30

33rd British Columbia election, 1983: West Vancouver-Howe Sound
Party	Candidate	Votes	%	±	Expenditures
Social Credit	John Reynolds	17,218	61.35%	–	unknown
New Democratic	Claus Frank Spiekerman	6,766	24.11%		unknown
Liberal	Morton Alexander Graham	1,941	6.92%		unknown
Progressive Conservative	Neil Stewart Thompson	1,824	6.50%		unknown
Independents	James Roland Chabot	316	1.12%		
Total valid votes		28,065	100.00%		
Total rejected ballots		234			
Turnout		%			

1974 Canadian federal election: Burnaby—Richmond—Delta
Party	Candidate	Votes	%	±%
Progressive Conservative	John Reynolds	34,013	54.81	+19.14
Liberal	Joan Wallace	17,570	28.31	-1.31
New Democratic	J.-P. Daem	10,106	16.28	-16.80
Communist	Homer J. Stevens	299	0.48	–
Marxist–Leninist	Steve Ruthchinski	70	0.11	–
Total valid votes		62,058	100.0	
Progressive Conservative hold		Swing		+10.22

1972 Canadian federal election: Burnaby—Richmond—Delta
Party	Candidate	Votes	%	±%
Progressive Conservative	John Reynolds	19,798	35.67	+22.47
New Democratic	Ken Novakowski	18,358	33.08	-4.87
Liberal	Thomas Henry Goode	16,441	29.62	-12.82
Social Credit	Gayle Dewhirst	906	1.63	-4.78
Total valid votes		55,503	100.0	
Progressive Conservative gain from Liberal		Swing		+13.67
