= 1930 Ontario Liberal Party leadership election =

Leadership election of the Ontario Liberal Party

- Date: 16–17 December 1930
- Convention: King Edward Hotel, Toronto, Ontario
- Resigning leader: W. E. N. Sinclair
- Won by: Mitchell Hepburn
- Ballots: 1
- Candidates: 2

The 1930 Ontario Liberal Party leadership convention was held on 16 and 17 December 1930 at the King Edward Hotel in Toronto, Ontario, to elect a leader of the Ontario Liberal Party. Mitchell Hepburn, the federal Member of Parliament for Elgin West, defeated journalist and former soldier Elmore Philpott on the first ballot to become party leader.

The convention marked a turning point in the history of the Ontario Liberal Party. After twenty-five years in opposition and years of organizational decline, delegates selected the thirty-four-year-old Hepburn as leader in the hope that he could rebuild the party and challenge the governing Conservatives.

== Background ==
The Ontario Liberal Party entered the 1930 convention in a weakened state. Since losing office in 1905, the party had struggled with internal divisions, organizational weakness, and competition from the United Farmers of Ontario and other reform movements.

For much of the 1920s, the party was led on an interim basis by W. E. N. Sinclair, who served as Liberal leader in the Legislative Assembly. Financial difficulties and factional disputes delayed the holding of a formal leadership convention for several years.

By 1930, dissatisfaction with the long-governing Conservative administration of Premier George S. Henry and the worsening economic conditions associated with the Great Depression created new opportunities for the Liberals. Party organizers hoped a leadership convention would revitalize the organization and broaden its appeal beyond its traditional rural and prohibitionist base.

== Candidates ==
=== Mitchell Hepburn ===
Mitchell Hepburn was the Liberal Member of Parliament for Elgin West. First elected to the House of Commons in 1926 at the age of thirty, he quickly gained a reputation as an energetic speaker and advocate for agricultural interests.

Hepburn's populist style and strong connections to rural Ontario made him an attractive candidate for delegates seeking to rebuild the party. He was widely viewed as representing a new generation of Liberal leadership.

=== Elmore Philpott ===
Elmore Philpott was an editorial writer for the Toronto Globe and a decorated veteran of the First World War. Severely wounded during military service, he remained partially disabled for the rest of his life.

Philpott campaigned as a reform-minded Liberal and attracted support from delegates seeking a stronger ideological alternative to the party establishment.

Philpott ran for the Liberals in a 1931 by-election, but was defeated. he would leave the Liberal Party in 1933 to join the newly founded Ontario Co-operative Commonwealth Federation, becoming president of the Ontario CCF Clubs and de facto co-leader of the party with Agnes McPhail. He quit the CCF in 1934 and would later move to British Columbia, rejoin the Liberals, and would serve as a Liberal Member of Parliament.

=== W. E. N. Sinclair ===
W. E. N. Sinclair, Member of Provincial Parliament for Ontario South, had served as Ontario Liberal leader since 1923. Although initially considered a candidate, he withdrew before balloting and later agreed to remain as Liberal leader in the legislature until Hepburn could enter provincial politics.

=== Sydney Tweed ===
Sydney Tweed was the Liberal Member of Provincial Parliament for Waterloo South. President and managing director of the Ontario Equitable Life and Accident Insurance Company before entering politics, he was nominated for the leadership but withdrew before balloting commenced.

== Convention ==
Approximately 1,200 delegates attended the convention in Toronto.

The gathering focused not only on the leadership contest but also on rebuilding the Ontario Liberal Party and adopting a new policy platform. Delegates debated issues including economic relief, agricultural policy, labour rights, and liquor regulation.

One of the most significant platform changes was the abandonment of prohibition as a formal party policy. Delegates adopted a resolution declaring that prohibition should no longer be regarded as a partisan issue.

As the convention proceeded, Sinclair, Tweed, and other prospective candidates withdrew, leaving Hepburn and Philpott as the principal contenders. Hepburn entered the vote as the clear favourite and won decisively on the first ballot.

== Results ==
Candidate	Votes	%
Mitchell Hepburn	427	81.5
Elmore Philpott	97	18.5
Total	524	100.0

== Aftermath ==
At thirty-four years of age, Hepburn became the youngest leader in the history of the Ontario Liberal Party. Sinclair agreed to continue serving as Liberal leader in the Legislative Assembly until Hepburn could obtain a provincial seat.

Over the following four years, Hepburn travelled extensively throughout Ontario rebuilding the party organization and attempting to unite Liberals, farmers, and other anti-Conservative voters behind a common political movement.

His efforts culminated in the 1934 Ontario general election, when the Liberals won a landslide victory and Hepburn became Premier of Ontario.

Historians have generally viewed the 1930 convention as one of the most important leadership contests in Ontario Liberal history because it marked the beginning of the Hepburn era and the party's eventual return to power after nearly three decades in opposition.
