= Church of the Open Door =

Former church in Los Angeles

Coordinates: 34.150926°N 117.877952°W

The Church of the Open Door is a non-denominational Christian Evangelical church in Glendora, California.

== History ==
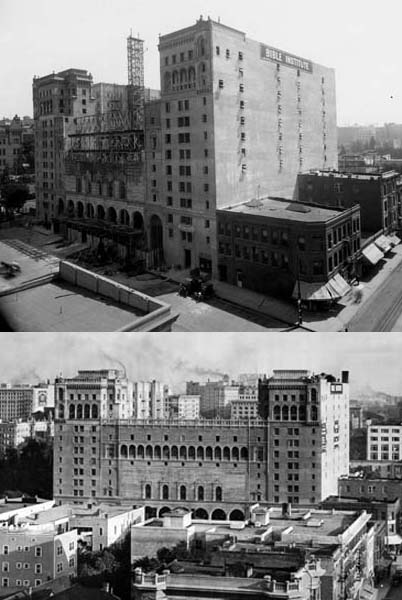
Biola's former Los Angeles building: under construction (top) and complete in 1916 (bottom).

The church was founded in 1915 by R. A. Torrey. The services were held at the Bible Institute of Los Angeles (Biola University), in a 4,000 seat auditorium. Peter Wiley Philpott was pastor of the church from 1929 to 1931, and J. Vernon McGee from 1949 to 1970.

The church relocated to Glendora, California in 1985. The original downtown church building was demolished in the late 1980s. Despite efforts led by the late William Eugene Scott to prevent the building from being sold to developers and to have the building saved as a historic landmark, the building could not be saved. It was so damaged in the 1987 Whittier Narrows earthquake that it was declared unsafe and the cost of repairs deemed prohibitive. One of the two historic "Jesus Saves" signs from the original building can now be seen atop the Ace Hotel Los Angeles. It was demolished in 1988. It was relocated there by the late William Eugene Scott who took it with him when his church (Los Angeles University Cathedral) relocated following the earthquake.

In 2015, David Anderson became Pastor.

== See also ==
- Biola University
