= Deeper and Deeper (hymn) =

"Deeper and Deeper" is a 1914 Christian hymn with words and music by Oswald J. Smith. The hymn begins; "Into the heart of Jesus, deeper and deeper I go". The hymn was sung as part of Smith's own ordination service by the Chicago Presbytery in 1915. The hymn sang itself into the preacher's heart. The hymn was completed at First Presbyterian Church of South Chicago. It has been published in 21 hymnals.
