= Vancouver South (federal electoral district) =

Defunct federal electoral district in British Columbia, Canada

Coordinates: 49.22°N 123.07°W

British Columbia electoral district
- Boundaries in relation to other Vancouver ridings

Defunct federal electoral district
- Legislature: House of Commons
- District created: 2003
- District abolished: 2023
- First contested: 2004
- Last contested: 2021
- District webpage: profile, map

Demographics
- Population (2021): 109,339
- Electors (2015): 68,733
- Area (km²): 20.69
- Census division: Metro Vancouver
- Census subdivision: Vancouver

Vancouver South (French: Vancouver-Sud) was a federal electoral district in British Columbia, Canada, that was represented in the House of Commons of Canada from 1917 to 1997, and again from 2004 to 2025. It covers the southern portion of the city of Vancouver, British Columbia. The district was replaced by Vancouver Fraserview—South Burnaby for the 2025 Canadian federal election.

== Demographics ==
The riding is one of the most diverse in Canada, with less than one-fifth of the population being of European descent. As of 2021, four pan-ethnic groups form greater than 10 percent of the riding; 38.1% East Asian, 18.7% European, 17.8% South Asian and 16% Southeast Asian.

Vancouver South is the centre of the city's South Asian community; the colourful Punjabi Market (Little India) and the close-knit community of religious Sikhs dominate the area. The service sector, retail trade and manufacturing are the major sources of employment in Vancouver South. Nearly 30% of residents over the age of 25 years have obtained a university certificate or degree. The average family income is over $71,000. Unemployment is around 6.3%.

Panethnic groups in Vancouver South (2001−2021)
Panethnic group	2021		2016		2011		2006		2001	
Panethnic group	Pop.	%	Pop.	%	Pop.	%	Pop.	%	Pop.	%
East Asian (Note: Statistic includes total responses of "Chinese", "Korean", and "Japanese" under visible minority section on census.)	41,190	38.14%	41,115	40.6%	40,960	41.37%	54,545	45.87%	49,735	44.66%
European (Note: Statistic includes all persons that did not make up part of a visible minority or an indigenous identity.)	20,175	18.68%	19,180	18.94%	19,180	19.37%	28,240	23.75%	31,435	28.23%
South Asian	19,260	17.84%	17,655	17.43%	18,070	18.25%	17,990	15.13%	15,825	14.21%
Southeast Asian (Note: Statistic includes total responses of "Filipino" and "Southeast Asian" under visible minority section on census.)	17,275	16%	15,360	15.17%	13,815	13.95%	11,295	9.5%	9,305	8.36%
Latin American	2,520	2.33%	1,950	1.93%	2,025	2.05%	1,855	1.56%	1,370	1.23%
Indigenous	1,520	1.41%	1,355	1.34%	1,435	1.45%	1,070	0.9%	870	0.78%
African	1,350	1.25%	1,070	1.06%	980	0.99%	1,060	0.89%	890	0.8%
Middle Eastern (Note: Statistic includes total responses of "West Asian" and "Arab" under visible minority section on census.)	1,075	1%	840	0.83%	715	0.72%	1,180	0.99%	815	0.73%
Other (Note: Statistic includes total responses of "Visible minority, n.i.e." and "Multiple visible minorities" under visible minority section on census.)	3,615	3.35%	2,745	2.71%	1,835	1.85%	1,655	1.39%	1,095	0.98%
Total responses	107,985	98.76%	101,265	98.39%	99,010	100%	118,905	98.84%	111,355	98.49%
Total population	109,339	100%	102,927	100%	100,966	100%	120,295	100%	113,065	100%
Notes: Totals greater than 100% due to multiple origin responses. Population drop between 2006 census and 2011 census due to 2012 Canadian federal electoral redistribution.

== History ==
This electoral district was formed in 1914 from Vancouver City riding.

In 1996, it was abolished and used to create Vancouver South—Burnaby with portions of New Westminster—Burnaby.

Vancouver South was re-created in 2003 when the Burnaby sections were moved into the new ridings Burnaby—Douglas and Burnaby—New Westminster.

The 2012 federal electoral boundaries redistribution concluded that the electoral boundaries of Vancouver South should be adjusted, and a modified electoral district of the same name will be contested in future elections. The redefined Vancouver South lost a portion of its territory west of Cambie Street to the new district of Vancouver Granville and gained a small area in the northeast that were then included in Vancouver Kingsway. These new boundaries were legally defined in the 2013 representation order, which came into effect upon the call of the 2015 Canadian federal election in October 2015. After the 2022 Canadian federal electoral redistribution, the district was replaced by Vancouver Fraserview—South Burnaby, Vancouver Granville and Vancouver Kingsway.

=== Historical boundaries ===
1914 representation order

1933 representation order

1947 representation order

1952 representation order

1966 representation order

1976 representation order

1987 representation order

2003 representation order

2013 representation order

=== Members of Parliament ===
This riding has elected the following members of Parliament:

Parliament	Years	Member	Party
Vancouver South; Riding created from Vancouver City
13th	1917–1921	Richard Clive Cooper	Government (Unionist)
14th	1921–1925	Leon Johnson Ladner	Conservative
15th	1925–1926	Leon Johnson Ladner	Conservative
16th	1926–1930	Leon Johnson Ladner	Conservative
17th	1930–1935	Angus MacInnis	Independent Labour
18th	1935–1940	Howard Charles Green	Conservative
19th	1940–1945	Howard Charles Green	National Government
20th	1945–1949	Howard Charles Green	Progressive Conservative
21st	1949–1953	Arthur Laing	Liberal
22nd	1953–1957	Elmore Philpott	Liberal
23rd	1957–1958	Ernest James Broome	Progressive Conservative
24th	1958–1962	Ernest James Broome	Progressive Conservative
25th	1962–1963	Arthur Laing	Liberal
26th	1963–1965	Arthur Laing	Liberal
27th	1965–1968	Arthur Laing	Liberal
28th	1968–1972	Arthur Laing	Liberal
29th	1972–1974	John Allen Fraser	Progressive Conservative
30th	1974–1979	John Allen Fraser	Progressive Conservative
31st	1979–1980	John Allen Fraser	Progressive Conservative
32nd	1980–1984	John Allen Fraser	Progressive Conservative
33rd	1984–1988	John Allen Fraser	Progressive Conservative
34th	1988–1993	John Allen Fraser	Progressive Conservative
35th	1993–1997	Herb Dhaliwal	Liberal
Riding dissolved into Vancouver South—Burnaby
Riding re-created from Vancouver South—Burnaby
38th	2004–2006	Ujjal Dosanjh	Liberal
39th	2006–2008	Ujjal Dosanjh	Liberal
40th	2008–2011	Ujjal Dosanjh	Liberal
41st	2011–2015	Wai Young	Conservative
42nd	2015–2019	Harjit Sajjan	Liberal
43rd	2019–2021	Harjit Sajjan	Liberal
44th	2021–2025	Harjit Sajjan	Liberal
Riding dissolved into Vancouver Fraserview—South Burnaby, Vancouver Granville and Vancouver Kingsway

== Election results ==
=== Vancouver South, 2004–present ===
Its current representing MP is Harjit Sajjan, who is Minister of International Development in the current federal Cabinet. He has been its MP since the 2015 federal election, when he beat the Conservative then-incumbent by more than 6,000 votes.

Graph of election results in Vancouver South (since 2004, minor parties that never got 2% of the vote or didn't run consistently are omitted) View source data.

2021 Canadian federal election
Party	Candidate	Votes	%	±%	Expenditures
Liberal	Harjit Sajjan	19,910	49.43	+8.20	$82,846.68
New Democratic	Sean McQuillan	9,922	24.63	+6.07	$3,175.98
Conservative	Sukhbir Singh Gill	9,060	22.49	–10.82	$92,566.51
People's	Anthony Cook	1,104	2.74	+1.51	$1,151.17
Marxist–Leninist	Anne Jamieson	287	0.71	–	none listed
Total valid votes/expense limit		40,283	98.79	–	$108,408.40
Total rejected ballots		493	1.21	+0.22	
Turnout		40,776	54.52	–3.78	
Eligible voters		74,785			
Liberal hold		Swing		+7.14	
Source: Elections Canada

2019 Canadian federal election
Party	Candidate	Votes	%	±%	Expenditures
Liberal	Harjit Sajjan	17,808	41.23	–7.58	$94,051.97
Conservative	Wai Young	14,388	33.31	–0.57	$82,435.52
New Democratic	Sean McQuillan	8,015	18.56	+4.59	$4,489.04
Green	Judy Zaichkowsky	2,451	5.67	+3.10	$4,303.51
People's	Alain Deng	532	1.23	–	$11,771.39
Total valid votes/expense limit		43,194	99.01	–	$105,031.23
Total rejected ballots		431	0.99	+0.41	
Turnout		43,625	58.30	–4.90	
Eligible voters		74,826			
Liberal hold		Swing		–3.51	
Source: Elections Canada

2015 Canadian federal election
Party	Candidate	Votes	%	±%	Expenditures
Liberal	Harjit Sajjan	21,773	48.81	+14.16	$161,402.16
Conservative	Wai Young	15,115	33.88	–9.43	$118,748.27
New Democratic	Amandeep Nijjar	6,230	13.97	–5.03	$62,783.70
Green	Elain Ng	1,149	2.58	+0.02	$5,232.68
Marxist–Leninist	Charles Boylan	178	0.40	–0.09	none listed
Progressive Canadian	Rajendra Gupta	166	0.37	–	$3,204.29
Total valid votes/expense limit		44,611	99.42	–	$203,440.39
Total rejected ballots		259	0.58	–0.04	
Turnout		44,870	63.20	+8.28	
Eligible voters		70,992			
Liberal gain from Conservative		Swing		+11.80	
Source: Elections Canada

2011 federal election redistributed results
Party	Vote	%
Conservative	15,571	42.43
Liberal	12,389	33.76
New Democratic	7,732	21.07
Green	808	2.20
Others	202	0.55

2011 Canadian federal election
Party	Candidate	Votes	%	±%	Expenditures
Conservative	Wai Young	19,504	43.31	+4.87	$84,618.98
Liberal	Ujjal Dosanjh	15,604	34.65	–3.84	$83,486.24
New Democratic	Meena Wong	8,552	18.99	+1.37	$27,664.35
Green	Jean de Dieu Hakizimana	1,151	2.56	–2.38	$1,255.40
Marxist–Leninist	Charles Boylan	222	0.49	–0.01	none listed
Total valid votes/expense limit		45,033	99.38	–	$88,671.72
Total rejected ballots		281	0.62	+0.09	
Turnout		45,314	54.92	+2.50	
Eligible voters		82,509			
Conservative gain from Liberal		Swing		+4.36	
Source: Elections Canada

2008 Canadian federal election
Party	Candidate	Votes	%	±%	Expenditures
Liberal	Ujjal Dosanjh	16,110	38.49	–9.55	$72,492.13
Conservative	Wai Young	16,090	38.44	+11.31	$79,397.59
New Democratic	Ann Chambers	7,376	17.62	–3.45	$22,191.27
Green	Csaba Gulyas	2,065	4.93	+1.65	$413.23
Marxist–Leninist	Charles Boylan	211	0.50	+0.04	none listed
Total valid votes/expense limit		41,852	99.47	–	$85,093.38
Total rejected ballots		223	0.53	+0.12	
Turnout		42,075	52.42	–3.94	
Eligible voters		80,271			
Liberal hold		Swing		–10.43	
Source: Elections Canada

2006 Canadian federal election
Party	Candidate	Votes	%	±%	Expenditures
Liberal	Ujjal Dosanjh	20,991	48.05	+3.53	$55,960.01
Conservative	Tarlok Sablok	11,856	27.14	+1.63	$66,891.32
New Democratic	Bev Meslo	9,205	21.07	–3.49	$30,480.62
Green	Doug Perry	1,435	3.28	–0.30	$1,223.61
Marxist–Leninist	Charles Boylan	202	0.46	+0.17	none listed
Total valid votes/expense limit		43,689	99.59	–	$78,464.39
Total rejected ballots		181	0.41	–0.28	
Turnout		43,870	56.35	+0.53	
Eligible voters		77,848			
Liberal hold		Swing		+0.95	
Source: Elections Canada

2004 Canadian federal election
Party	Candidate	Votes	%	Expenditures
Liberal	Ujjal Dosanjh	18,196	44.52	$70,345.70
Conservative	Victor Soo Chan	10,426	25.51	$68,497.61
New Democratic	Bev Meslo	10,038	24.56	$28,669.00
Green	Doug Perry	1,465	3.58	none listed
Christian Heritage	Frank Wagner	339	0.83	$730.45
Marxist–Leninist	Charles Boylan	119	0.29	$150.00
Communist	Stephen Von Sychowcki	105	0.26	$389.85
Independent	H. M.R. Sandhu	98	0.24	$4,846.10
Canadian Action	Joe Sixpack Horrocks	90	0.22	none listed
Total valid votes/expense limit		40,876	99.31	$74,435.13
Total rejected ballots		284	0.69	
Turnout		41,160	55.82	
Eligible voters		73,738		
This riding was re-created from parts of Vancouver South—Burnaby, which elected a Liberal in the previous election.
Source: Elections Canada

=== Vancouver South, 1917–1997 ===
Graph of election results in Vancouver South (1917–1993, minor parties that never got 2% of the vote or didn't run consistently are omitted) View source data.

1993 Canadian federal election
Party	Candidate	Votes	%	±%
Liberal	Herb Dhaliwal	17,215	35.61	+6.83
Reform	Gordon Shreeve	12,292	25.43	+23.34
Progressive Conservative	K.K. Wan	11,359	23.50	–18.73
New Democratic	John Maté	3,625	7.50	–16.26
National	Cameron Ward	2,113	4.37	–
Libertarian	John Clarke	554	1.15	–0.74
Green	Valerie Jerome	418	0.86	+0.21
Natural Law	Prince Pabbies	287	0.59	–
Independent	Jas Mangat	278	0.58	–
Independent	Dan Logan	69	0.14	–
Independent	Robert Walter Ross	60	0.12	–
Marxist–Leninist	Allan H. Bezanson	47	0.10	–
Independent	Issam Mansour	20	0.04	–
Total valid votes		48,317	99.00	
Total rejected ballots		487	1.00	+0.37
Turnout		48,804	65.89	–9.40
Eligible voters		74,071		
Liberal gain from Progressive Conservative		Swing		–8.26
Source: Elections Canada

1988 Canadian federal election
Party	Candidate	Votes	%	±%
Progressive Conservative	John Allen Fraser	21,222	42.23	–12.64
Liberal	Woody MacLaren	14,468	28.79	+8.31
New Democratic	Martin Toren	11,939	23.76	+0.25
Reform	Don Evans	1,052	2.09	–
Libertarian	John Clarke	946	1.88	–
Green	Douglas Dunn	327	0.65	–0.49
Rhinoceros	Brian Godzilla Salmi	173	0.34	–
Independent	Barbara Waldern	74	0.15	–
Communist	Reg Walters	54	0.11	–
Total valid votes		50,255	99.37	
Total rejected ballots		318	0.63	+0.16
Turnout		50,573	75.29	–1.94
Eligible voters		67,170		
Progressive Conservative hold		Swing		–10.48
Source: Elections Canada

1984 Canadian federal election
Party	Candidate	Votes	%	±%
Progressive Conservative	John Allen Fraser	25,469	54.87	+1.59
New Democratic	Brian Ernest Emery	10,909	23.50	+2.24
Liberal	Harkirpal S. Sara	9,507	20.48	–4.03
Green	Don Smardon	529	1.14	–
Total valid votes		46,414	99.53	
Total rejected ballots		218	0.47	+0.21
Turnout		46,632	77.23	+5.60
Eligible voters		60,381		
Progressive Conservative hold		Swing		–0.32
Source: Elections Canada

1980 Canadian federal election
Party	Candidate	Votes	%	±%
Progressive Conservative	John Allen Fraser	22,288	53.28	–0.51
Liberal	Patrick F. Graham	10,254	24.51	–0.56
New Democratic	Judy McManus	8,896	21.27	+0.36
Rhinoceros	Linda Fleming	327	0.78	–
Marxist–Leninist	Amarjit Dhillon	63	0.15	–0.07
Total valid votes		41,828	99.74	
Total rejected ballots		108	0.26	–0.12
Turnout		41,936	71.63	–4.80
Eligible voters		58,544		
Progressive Conservative hold		Swing		+0.02
Source: Elections Canada

1979 Canadian federal election
Party	Candidate	Votes	%	±%
Progressive Conservative	John Allen Fraser	22,653	53.80	+0.92
Liberal	Tony Toth	10,558	25.07	–6.50
New Democratic	Judy McManus	8,806	20.91	+5.83
Marxist–Leninist	Amarjit Dhillon	91	0.22	+0.04
Total valid votes		42,108	99.63	
Total rejected ballots		158	0.37	+0.12
Turnout		42,266	76.43	–0.71
Eligible voters		55,299		
Progressive Conservative hold		Swing		+3.71
Source: Elections Canada

1974 Canadian federal election
Party	Candidate	Votes	%	±%
Progressive Conservative	John Allen Fraser	23,247	52.88	+12.84
Liberal	Peter Oberlander	13,881	31.57	–1.22
New Democratic	Roger Howard	6,629	15.08	–10.04
Communist	James W. Beyon	129	0.29	–
Marxist–Leninist	Anne Boylan	79	0.18	–
Total valid votes		43,965	99.74	
Total rejected ballots		113	0.26	–1.08
Turnout		44,078	77.14	–0.88
Eligible voters		57,141		
Progressive Conservative hold		Swing		+7.03
Source: Library of Parliament

1972 Canadian federal election
Party	Candidate	Votes	%	±%
Progressive Conservative	John Allen Fraser	17,762	40.03	+16.29
Liberal	Gordon Gibson Jr	14,549	32.79	–16.47
New Democratic	Roger Howard	11,145	25.12	+2.47
Social Credit	Tony Jefferson	765	1.72	–2.23
Independent	Sean Griffin	102	0.23	–
Independent	Rick Hundal	44	0.10	–
Total valid votes		44,367	98.67	
Total rejected ballots		600	1.33	+0.79
Turnout		44,967	78.02	+0.54
Eligible voters		57,638		
Progressive Conservative gain from Liberal		Swing		+16.38
Source: Library of Parliament

1968 Canadian federal election
Party	Candidate	Votes	%	±%
Liberal	Arthur Laing	19,757	49.26	+5.73
Progressive Conservative	John Allen Fraser	9,521	23.74	+7.70
New Democratic	Joe Warnock	9,086	22.65	–2.14
Social Credit	Daniel A. Devlin	1,585	3.95	–10.57
Communist	Robin Smith	157	0.39	–0.71
Total valid votes		40,106	99.46	
Total rejected ballots		218	0.54	–0.11
Turnout		40,324	77.48	–0.22
Eligible voters		52,044		
Liberal hold		Swing		–0.98
Source: Library of Parliament

1965 Canadian federal election
Party	Candidate	Votes	%	±%
Liberal	Arthur Laing	18,669	43.54	–1.53
New Democratic	Norman Levi	10,633	24.80	+2.08
Progressive Conservative	Mary Southin	6,877	16.04	–6.04
Social Credit	Norman Howard	6,228	14.52	+5.20
Communist	William Stewart	474	1.11	+0.29
Total valid votes		42,881	99.35	
Total rejected ballots		282	0.65	+0.20
Turnout		43,163	77.70	–5.07
Eligible voters		55,548		
Liberal hold		Swing		–1.81
Source: Library of Parliament

1963 Canadian federal election
Party	Candidate	Votes	%	±%
Liberal	Arthur Laing	19,140	45.07	+8.63
New Democratic	Cliff Augustine Greer	9,649	22.72	+0.02
Progressive Conservative	John Ferguson Browne	9,374	22.07	–7.73
Social Credit	Erling L. Backman	3,960	9.32	–0.50
Communist	Tom McEwen	345	0.81	–0.41
Total valid votes		42,468	99.55	
Total rejected ballots		193	0.45	–0.26
Turnout		42,661	82.78	+2.44
Eligible voters		51,538		
Liberal hold		Swing		+4.30
Source: Library of Parliament

1962 Canadian federal election
Party	Candidate	Votes	%	±%
Liberal	Arthur Laing	14,660	36.44	+18.74
Progressive Conservative	Ernest James Broome	11,990	29.81	–30.65
New Democratic	Cliff Augustine Greer	9,132	22.70	+7.20
Social Credit	Erling L. Backman	3,953	9.83	+4.64
Communist	William Stewart	492	1.22	+0.08
Total valid votes		40,227	99.29	
Total rejected ballots		288	0.71	+0.12
Turnout		40,515	80.34	+4.50
Eligible voters		50,429		
Liberal gain from Progressive Conservative		Swing		+24.70
New Democrate vote is compared to the Co-operative Commonwealth vote and Communist vote is compared to Labor–Progressive vote from 1958 election.
Source: Library of Parliament

1958 Canadian federal election
Party	Candidate	Votes	%	±%
Progressive Conservative	Ernest James Broome	22,292	60.46	+15.60
Liberal	Elmore Philpott	6,528	17.70	–3.44
Co-operative Commonwealth	Cliff Augustine Greer	5,717	15.50	+1.96
Social Credit	Hilliard Beyerstein	1,914	5.19	–12.98
Labor–Progressive	Tom McEwen	422	1.14	–1.14
Total valid votes		36,873	99.41	
Total rejected ballots		220	0.59	–0.27
Turnout		37,093	75.84	–0.54
Eligible voters		48,907		
Progressive Conservative hold		Swing		+9.52
Source: Library of Parliament

1957 Canadian federal election
Party	Candidate	Votes	%	±%
Progressive Conservative	Ernest James Broome	16,058	44.86	+27.41
Liberal	Elmore Philpott	7,568	21.14	–15.46
Social Credit	Hilliard Beyerstein	6,505	18.17	–5.16
Co-operative Commonwealth	Cliff Augustine Greer	4,849	13.55	–6.09
Labor–Progressive	Tom McEwen	817	2.28	–0.70
Total valid votes		35,797	99.14	
Total rejected ballots		311	0.86	+0.31
Turnout		36,108	76.39	+10.53
Eligible voters		47,270		
Progressive Conservative gain from Liberal		Swing		+21.44
Source: Library of Parliament

1953 Canadian federal election
Party	Candidate	Votes	%	±%
Liberal	Elmore Philpott	10,459	36.60	–3.11
Social Credit	Ira N. Monson	6,668	23.34	–
Co-operative Commonwealth	Cliff Augustine Greer	5,610	19.63	–11.93
Progressive Conservative	Lorraine Johnston	4,986	17.45	–11.28
Labor–Progressive	Gordon Wesley Elder	852	2.98	–
Total valid votes		28,575	99.45	
Total rejected ballots		157	0.55	–0.27
Turnout		28,732	65.86	–2.76
Eligible voters		43,625		
Liberal hold		Swing		–13.22
Source: Library of Parliament

1949 Canadian federal election
Party	Candidate	Votes	%	±%
Liberal	Arthur Laing	13,082	39.71	+14.66
Co-operative Commonwealth	Grace MacInnis	10,397	31.56	+13.90
Progressive Conservative	Jonathan Webster Cornett	9,462	28.72	–25.06
Total valid votes		32,941	99.18	
Total rejected ballots		271	0.82	–0.38
Turnout		33,212	68.62	–11.69
Eligible voters		48,398		
Liberal gain from Progressive Conservative		Swing		+0.38
Source: Library of Parliament

1945 Canadian federal election
Party	Candidate	Votes	%	±%
Progressive Conservative	Howard Charles Green	25,878	53.78	+5.15
Liberal	Richard Rowe Holland	12,056	25.06	–10.36
Co-operative Commonwealth	Edward Alexander Lucas	8,497	17.66	+1.70
Democratic	George Rayburn Smith	920	1.91	–
Social Credit	Walter Redvers Dent	766	1.59	–
Total valid votes		48,117	98.80	
Total rejected ballots		584	1.20	+0.15
Turnout		48,701	80.31	+2.13
Eligible voters		60,639		
Progressive Conservative gain from National Government		Swing		+7.76
Source: Library of Parliament

1940 Canadian federal election
Party	Candidate	Votes	%	±%
National Government	Howard Charles Green	18,470	48.63	+17.94
Liberal	Sidney Alexander Smith	13,451	35.41	+5.63
Co-operative Commonwealth	Arthur James Turner	6,062	15.96	–11.95
Total valid votes		37,983	98.95	
Total rejected ballots		404	1.05	+0.03
Turnout		38,387	78.18	–1.39
Eligible voters		49,102		
National Government gain from Conservative		Swing		+6.16
Source: Library of Parliament

1935 Canadian federal election
Party	Candidate	Votes	%	±%
Conservative	Howard Charles Green	9,491	30.69	–16.54
Liberal	Alexander Malcolm Manson	9,212	29.78	–
Co-operative Commonwealth	Robert Skinner	8,632	27.91	–
Reconstruction	Archie Bertram Carey	2,896	9.36	–
Independent	Paul McDowell Kerr	699	2.26	–
Total valid votes		30,930	98.97	
Total rejected ballots		321	1.03	+1.03
Turnout		31,251	79.57	+12.99
Eligible voters		39,274		
Conservative gain from Independent Labour		Swing		–23.16
Source: Library of Parliament

1930 Canadian federal election
Party	Candidate	Votes	%	±%
Independent Labour	Angus MacInnis	15,732	50.03	+34.58
Conservative	Leon Johnson Ladner	14,850	47.23	–8.78
Communist	William Bennett	861	2.74	–
Total valid votes		31,443	100.00	
Total rejected ballots		–		
Turnout		31,443	66.58	–5.47
Eligible voters		47,226		
Independent Labour gain from Conservative		Swing		+21.68
Source: Library of Parliament

1926 Canadian federal election
Party	Candidate	Votes	%	±%
Conservative	Leon Johnson Ladner	9,762	56.01	+8.75
Liberal	Paul McDowell Kerr	4,973	28.53	–8.88
Labour	Alfred Hurry	2,693	15.45	+0.13
Total valid votes		17,428	100.00	
Total rejected ballots		–		
Turnout		17,428	72.05	–7.60
Eligible voters		24,188		
Conservative hold		Swing		+8.82
Source: Library of Parliament

1925 Canadian federal election
Party	Candidate	Votes	%	±%
Conservative	Leon Johnson Ladner	8,587	47.27	+9.52
Liberal	Robert George Macpherson	6,797	37.41	+5.63
Labour	Alfred Hurry	2,783	15.32	–6.49
Total valid votes		18,167	100.00	
Total rejected ballots		–		
Turnout		18,167	79.65	+14.34
Eligible voters		22,809		
Conservative hold		Swing		+1.94
Source: Library of Parliament

1921 Canadian federal election
Party	Candidate	Votes	%	±%
Conservative	Leon Johnson Ladner	4,893	37.75	–27.39
Liberal	Victor Odlum	4,120	31.79	+8.51
Labour	Thomas Richardson	2,827	21.81	+10.69
Independent	John Kavanagh	810	6.25	–
Progressive	John Isaac Richmond	312	2.41	–
Total valid votes		12,962	100.00	
Total rejected ballots		–		
Turnout		12,962	65.31	–33.67
Eligible voters		19,847		
Conservative hold		Swing		–17.95
Conservative vote is compared to Unionist vote in 1917 election.
Source: Library of Parliament

1917 Canadian federal election
Party	Candidate	Votes	%
Government (Unionist)	Richard Clive Cooper	6,890	65.14
Opposition (Laurier Liberals)	Charles Macdonald	2,462	23.27
Labour	James Hackett McVety	1,176	11.12
Unknown	Edward Gold	50	0.47
Total valid votes		10,578	100.00
Total rejected ballots		–	
Turnout		10,578	98.98
Eligible voters		10,687	
This riding was created from parts of Vancouver City, which elected a Conservative in the previous election.
Source: Library of Parliament

== See also ==
- List of Canadian electoral districts
- Historical federal electoral districts of Canada
