= Leon Johnson Ladner =

Canadian politician (1884–1978)

Member of Parliament for Vancouver South
- In office 1921–1930
- Preceded by: Richard Clive Cooper
- Succeeded by: Angus MacInnis

Personal details
- Born: November 29, 1884; Ladner, British Columbia, Canada
- Died: April 12, 1978 (aged 93); Vancouver, British Columbia, Canada
- Political party: Conservative
- Spouse: Jeanne Lantzius
- Profession: lawyer

Leon Johnson Ladner (November 29, 1884 – April 12, 1978) was a Canadian lawyer and Conservative politician who represented Vancouver South in the House of Commons of Canada from 1921 to 1930.
