= Hilliard Beyerstein =

Canadian politician

Member of Parliament for Camrose
- In office 1949–1953
- Preceded by: James Alexander Marshall
- Succeeded by: district abolished

Personal details
- Born: November 3, 1907 Meeting Creek, Alberta, Canada
- Died: September 23, 1990 (aged 82) Port Moody, British Columbia, Canada
- Party: Social Credit Party of Canada
- Spouse(s): Christine Nelson (m. 22 Apr 1943)
- Children: Barry Lane Beyerstein
- Profession: chiropractor

Hilliard Harris William Beyerstein (November 3, 1907 – September 23, 1990) was a Canadian chiropractor and politician.

Born in Meeting Creek, Alberta, Beyerstein first ran for the House of Commons of Canada as a Social Credit Party candidate in the 1949 federal election. He defeated 3 other candidates to win the Camrose electoral district. His district was abolished in the 1953 general election and he did not seek re-election that year.

Beyerstein moved to British Columbia and ran for another term in office in the 1957 federal election in the district of Vancouver South but was defeated by Ernest James Broome. Parliament dissolved a year later and Broome and Beyerstein would run against each other for the second time in the 1958 federal election. Beyerstein would be badly defeated finishing fourth out of five candidates. He would attempt to run for office for the last time in 1962 federal election in the Burnaby—Richmond district but lost to Bob Prittie. He died in a hospital in Port Moody, British Columbia in 1990. He had suffered from congestive heart failure.

He was the father of Barry Beyerstein, scientific skeptic and professor of psychology.
