= John Drysdale (politician) =

Canadian politician (1926–1996)

John Andrew W. Drysdale

Member of Parliament for Burnaby—Richmond
- In office March 1958 – June 1962
- Preceded by: Thomas Irwin
- Succeeded by: Bob Prittie

Personal details
- Born: May 31, 1926 Winnipeg, Manitoba, Canada
- Died: January 31, 1996 (aged 69)
- Party: Progressive Conservative
- Profession: barrister, lawyer

John Andrew Wishart Drysdale (May 31, 1926 – January 31, 1996) was a Canadian Progressive Conservative party politician who was a member of the House of Commons. Drysdale was a barrister and lawyer by career. He graduated from the University of British Columbia with a Bachelor of Arts degree in 1949, then a Bachelor of Laws degree in 1952.

Drysdale was first elected at the Burnaby—Richmond riding in the 1958 general election, after an unsuccessful attempt to win the seat there in the 1957 election. After serving his only term, the 24th Canadian Parliament, Drysdale was defeated in the 1962 election by Bob Prittie of the New Democratic Party.

Drysdale died on January 31, 1996, at the age of 69.
