= Bob Prittie =

Canadian politician

Robert "Bob" William Prittie
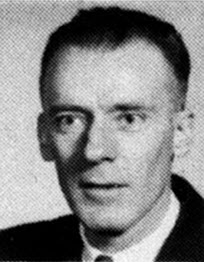

Member of Parliament for Burnaby—Richmond
- In office June 18, 1962 – June 25, 1968
- Preceded by: John Drysdale
- Succeeded by: Thomas Henry Goode

Mayor of Burnaby
- In office 1969–1973
- Preceded by: Alan Emmott
- Succeeded by: Thomas W. Constable

Personal details
- Born: December 5, 1919 North Vancouver, British Columbia
- Died: January 14, 2002 (aged 82)
- Party: New Democratic Party; Burnaby Citizens Association

Robert William Prittie (December 5, 1919 – January 14, 2002) was a Canadian politician. He was a New Democratic member of Parliament from Burnaby—Richmond from 1962 to 1968 and mayor of Burnaby, British Columbia from 1969 to 1973.

The Metrotown branch of the Burnaby Public Library is named after him. His archive is held at the Bowen Island Museum and Archives.
