= Equitable Building =

Equitable Building may refer to:

- Equitable Building (Denver)
- Equitable Building (Atlanta)
- Equitable Building (Atlanta 1892)
- Equitable Building (Chicago)
- Equitable Building (Des Moines)
- Equitable Building (Baltimore)
- Equitable Building (Manhattan)
- Commonwealth Building (Portland, Oregon) or Equitable Building
- Equitable Building of Hollywood
- Equitable Life Building (Los Angeles)

== See also ==
- Axa Equitable Center, also known as the Axa Equitable Building
- Equitable Co-operative Building Association, Washington, DC
- Equitable Life Building (disambiguation)
- Palais Equitable, Vienna
