= Tom Goode (politician) =

Canadian politician (1900–1983)

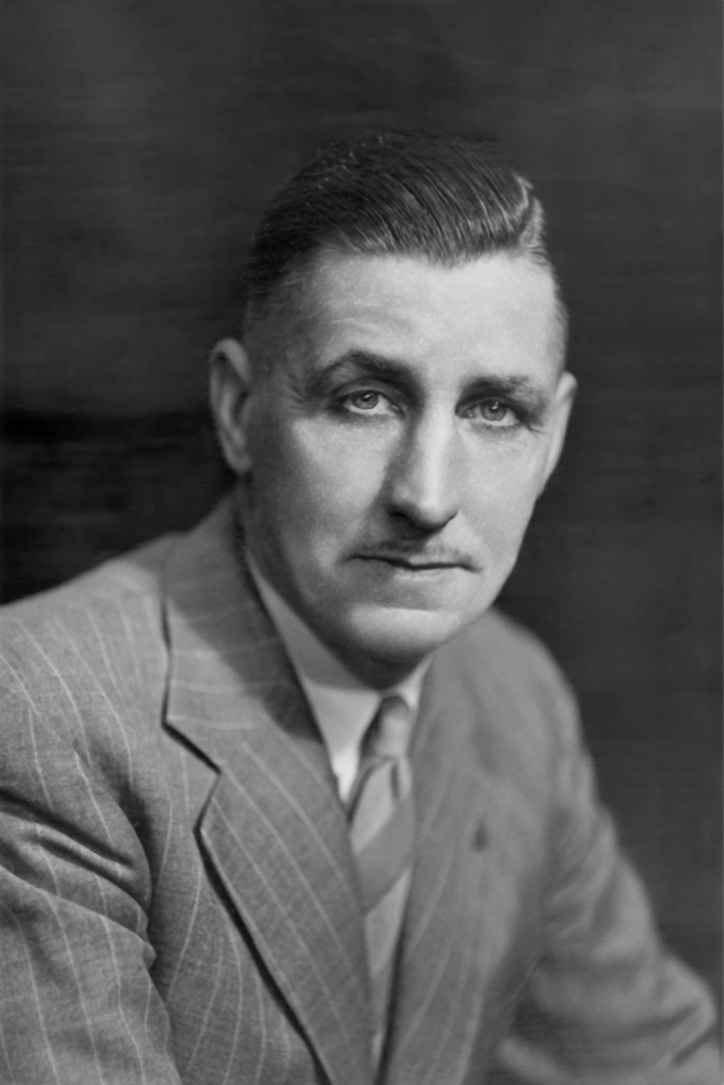

Member of Parliament for Burnaby—Richmond
- In office June 27, 1949 – June 9, 1957
- Preceded by: first member
- Succeeded by: Thomas Irwin

Personal details
- Born: November 9, 1900 Walthamstow, Essex, England
- Died: September 12, 1983 (aged 82) Surrey, British Columbia
- Party: Liberal
- Children: Thomas Henry Goode
- Profession: sales manager

Thomas Henry Goode (November 9, 1900 – September 12, 1983) was a Liberal party member of the House of Commons of Canada, representing the district of Burnaby—Richmond from 1949 to 1957. His son, Thomas Henry Goode, later represented the same electoral district from 1968 to 1972. Tom Goode died in Surrey in 1983 of a heart attack.
