= Equitable Life of Canada =

Canadian life insurance company

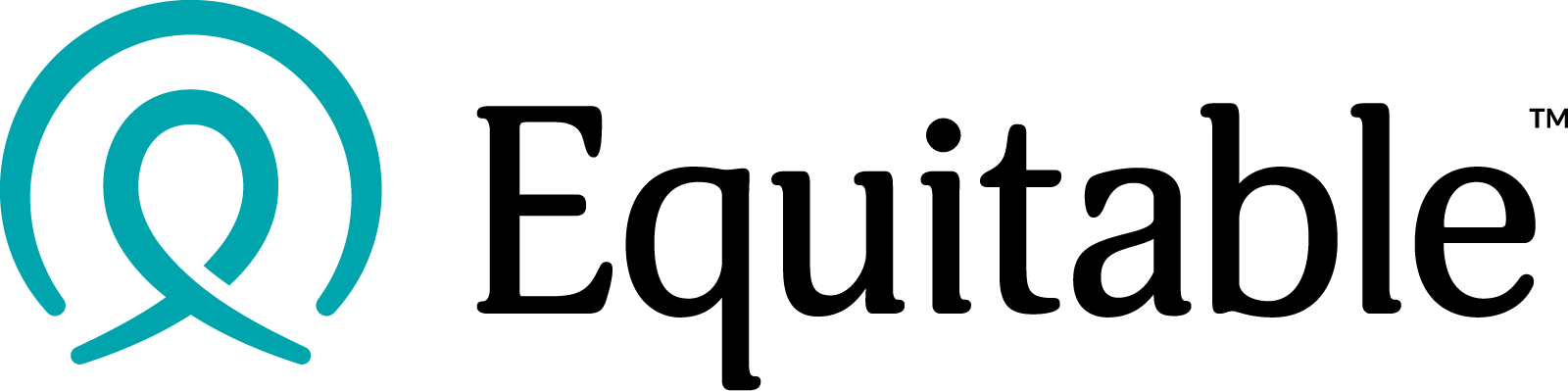
- Formerly: Ontario Equitable Life and Accident Insurance Company (1920–1936)
- Type: Public (1920–1963); Mutual (1963–present)
- Industry: Life insurance
- Founded: 19 November 1920
- Headquarters: 1 Westmount Road North, Waterloo, Ontario
- Website: equitable.ca

The Equitable Life Insurance Company of Canada is a Canadian life insurance company that has operated since 1920. The company was founded under a provincial charter as the Ontario Equitable Life and Accident Insurance Company. In 1936, a new company, the Equitable Life Insurance Company of Canada, was incorporated under a federal charter and assumed the operations of the Ontario Equitable Life. Equitable was founded as a joint-stock company, but in 1958 began buying back its stock and in 1963 converted to a mutual. As a mutual company, Equitable has remained an independent, medium-size business despite major consolidation in the industry.

== History ==
=== Provincial corporation, 1920–1936 ===
The founder and builder of Equitable Life was Sydney Charles Tweed (1886–1942). Tweed was born in Vankleek Hill, Ontario in 1886; his paternal grandparents had come to Canada from County Antrim. In 1888, the Tweed family moved to Winnipeg, where Sydney attended high school until the age of 15. After leaving school in 1891, he joined the Metropolitan Life, and remained with the company until 1901. That year, he moved to London, Ontario where he became the district manager for Equitable Life of New York. In 1916, he left Equitable and moved to Waterloo, where he became superintendent of agencies for Mutual Life.

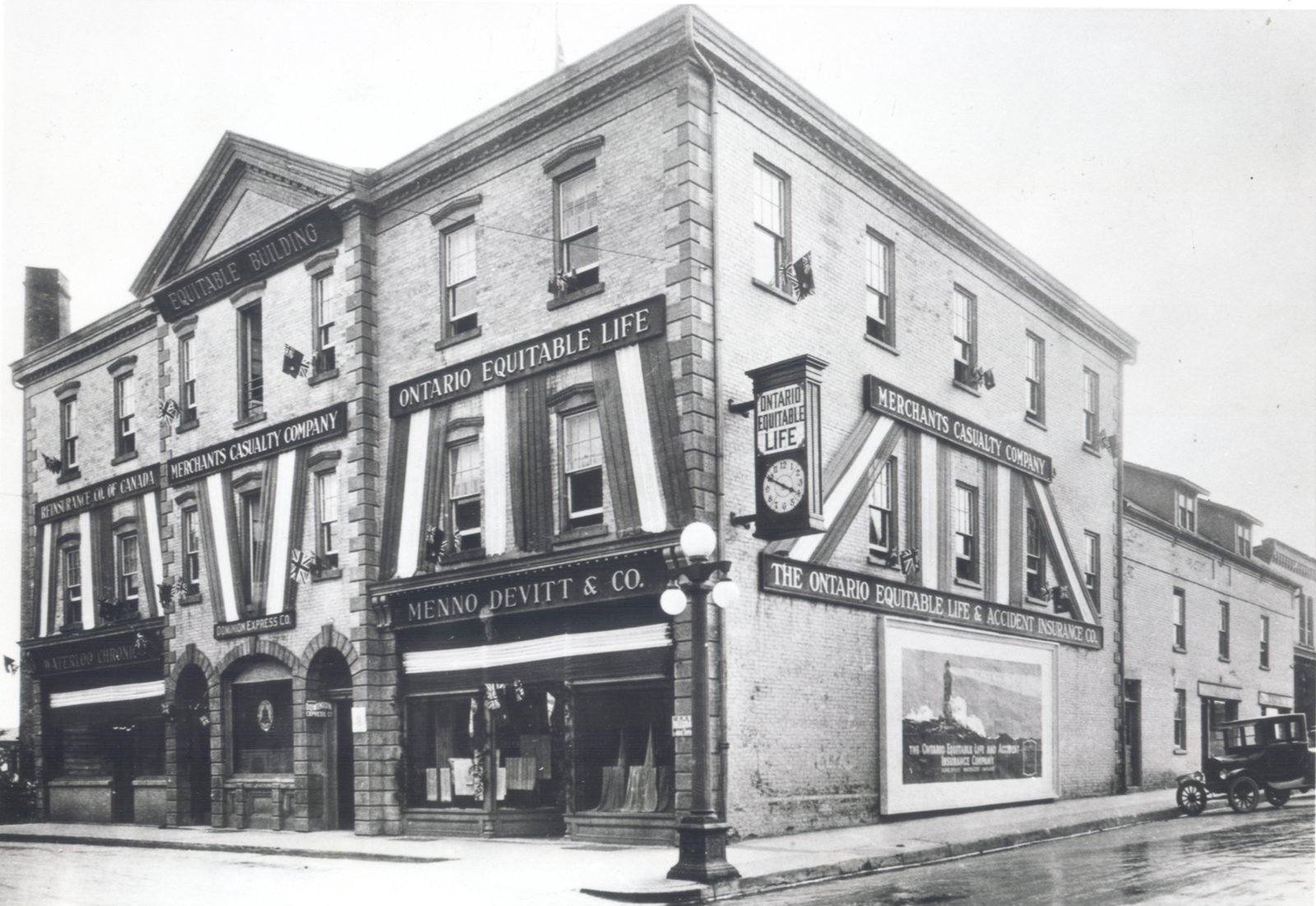
From 1922 to 1971, Equitable's offices were in the Devitt Block at 9 Erb Street

Tweed left his position with Mutual Life in 1920 to found the Ontario Equitable Life and Accident Insurance Company. The company issued $500,000 of stock in October 1920, and by early November the full issue had been taken up. Ontario Equitable's first three employees were president and general manager Tweed, a stenographer, and Mervyn J. Smith, a clerk. The company set up its first offices on the second floor of the Waterloo Mutual Fire Insurance Building at King and Dupont. After a short time, Equitable moved into two offices on the second floor of the former Mutual Life building at 14 Erb Street. Finally, in 1922, Equitable purchased the Devitt Block at Erb and King, where it remained for the next 50 years.

On 9 October 1930, Equitable hired Charles Avery Dunning (1885–1958) as a vice-president after his defeat in the 1930 Canadian federal election. Dunning had received several offers in the private sector, and he chose Equitable as is did not require that he retire from public life. At the company's 1932 annual meeting, Dunning was appointed the company's new president. Dunning remained president until he was reelected to the House of Commons in the 1935 Canadian federal election and was appointed minister of finance. In December 1935, James Layton Ralston (1881–1948) was appointed as Dunning's replacement.

=== Federal corporation, 1936–present ===
On 2 June 1936, the Act to incorporate The Equitable Life Insurance Company of Canada received royal assent. Subsequently, The new federal corporation acquired the operations of the original provincial corporation.

In September 1939, Ralston returned to parliament where he replaced Dunning as minister of finance. In January 1940, Mervyn J. Smith (1894–1978) was appointed the new president. Smith had joined Equitable in November 1920 when the company began operations. He became secretary in 1922 and general manager in 1931. Smith would run Equitable for the next 27 years.

In late 1957, the federal government made amendments to the Canadian and British Insurance Companies Act that established the mechanism for stock companies to mutualise. On 5 February 1958, Equitable's plan to mutualise was approved by the minister of finance, and soon after, a special meeting of the company's policy holders was called to approve the project. Equitable planned to buy back its stock using its own earnings, and it expected the project to last ten years. There were six rounds of purchases and stock was bought at $65 per share. The final stock purchase was in March 1963, ahead of the company's planned timeline. Once the company became the sole owner of its share, the stock was cancelled, and Equitable became a mutual company.

At the annual general meeting on Monday, 6 February 1967, Smith retired from the presidency and was elected to the newly created office of chairman of the board. In his place, Howard Ezra Power (1902–1988), the company's managing director, was appointed president. Power had joined Equitable in 1923 and had risen gradually through the ranks. Smith remained chairman until the annual meeting in February 1968, when he became honorary chairman. Power was elected as his replacement. Smith remained a director and retired from the company officially in February 1974.

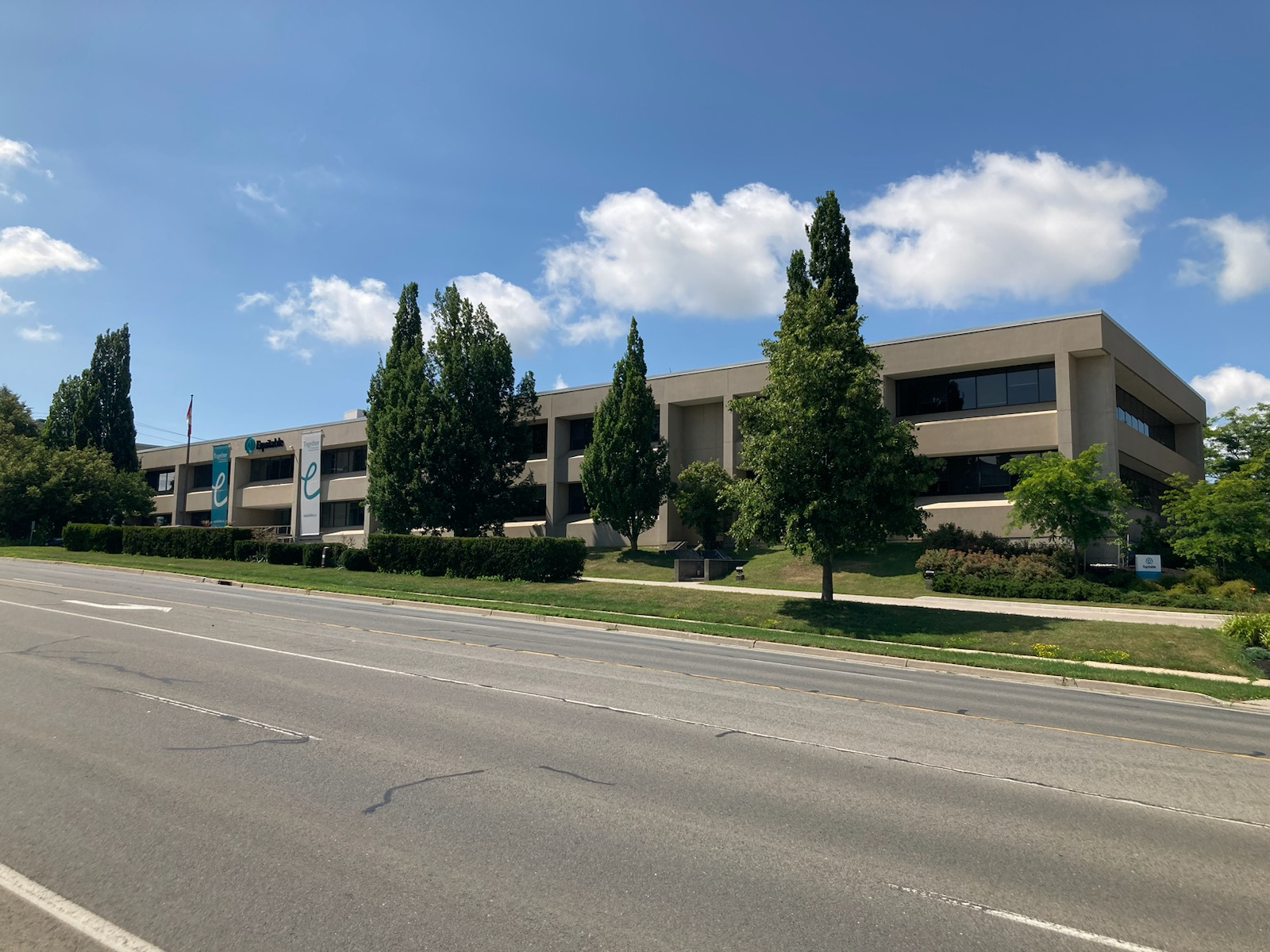
The headquarters on Westmount Road opened on 6 December 1971. They were designed by John B. Parkin Associates.

In 1962, Equitable purchased a property at the northwest corner of Westmount Road and Erb Street to build a new head office. The purchase was made in partnership with Waterloo Mutual Insurance, which purchased the adjacent property to the north. By 1964, plans were underway to leave their old headquarters, however, it was not until June 1970 that the company unveiled its design. The unveiling coincided with the company's 50th anniversary. The building was designed by John B. Parkin Associates of Toronto and completed by the successor firm Searle Wilbee Rowland. Walter Fedy McCargar and Hachborn served as consulting engineers, William Wayne Kilborn acted as the interior design consultant, Anders Kalm was the landscape architect, and Lavern Asmussen Limited was given the building contract. On Monday, 6 December 1971, Equitable moved into its new building. The opening ceremonies were held on Monday, 10 January 1972. In 1972, Waterloo Mutual, which had left its site vacant, sold its lot to a subsidiary of Equitable Life. The property was used by Equitable to build the Beacon Tower apartment building, named after Equitable's lighthouse logo.

Following the company's annual meeting on 1 February 1971, Thomas Ronald Suttie (1915–1998) was appointed president. Suttie was born in Dublin, Ireland to Scottish parents and was raised in Dundee, Scotland. In 1932, Suttie moved to London to work as an office boy at the Northern Assurance Company while taking night classes. He became an actuary in 1940, and from 1946 to 1949 worked for the Royal Mutual Insurance Society. In 1949, Suttie and his wife moved to Canada where he took a post as an actuary with Equitable. In February 1978, Power stepped down from the chairmanship and Suttie was elected to this office also.

Suttie stepped down from the presidency at the end of 1980, though he remained chairman of the board until 1990. On 1 January 1981, Donald Lorne MacLeod (1924–1987) became president. MacLeod was from Moncton and graduated from Mount Allison University in 1944. Upon graduation he worked in insurance in New Brunswick and Newfoundland before joining Equitable in 1958 as assistant superintendent for agencies. He became director of agencies in 1964, a vice-president in 1967, and an executive vice-president in 1978.

In November 1986, MacLeod became ill and took leave from his duties. The following month, Harvey Ian McIntosh (1930–2019) assumed the role of acting president. McIntosh had joined Equitable in 1952 after graduating with a degree in mathematics and physics from the University of Toronto. He became a Fellow of the Society of Actuaries in 1955, at which time he was appointed an associate actuary at the company. McIntosh was appointed a vice-president in 1968, senior vice-president and chief actuary in 1981, and senior vice-president and chief marketing officer in 1985. In March 1987, McIntosh was appointed president officially, as MacLeod remained on leave. On 3 August 1987, MacLeod died at age 62.

At the start of McIntosh's term as president, Equitable moved into high-interest annuity sales, and between 1987 and 1990 was the country's fastest growing life insurance company. By 1991, around 60 per cent of the company's $173 million income came from annuities, and the only profitable place to invest the income was in real estate. That year, $300 million of the company's $826 million in assets were invested in commercial real estate. Due to the early 1990s recession, 10 per cent of the portfolio was not generating income. In 1991 Equitable lost $21 million, and in 1992 it lost $24 million.

McIntosh retired from the presidency in 1992 and Peter Haig Williams was appointed as his replacement, effective 1 July. The Welsh-born Williams had been a partner at Peat Marwick Stevenson & Kellogg in Toronto and was tasked with saving the failing company. In 1993 Equitable had a net income of $4.9 million, and Williams would oversee ten consecutive quarters of profitability. In September 1995, Williams resigned unexpectedly from the post; despite his abrupt departure, chairman Weber continued to praise him for his work while leading the company. During the search for a new president, Weber assumed the role of chief executive. In January 1996, the company named Ronald H. Beaubien as its new president. Beaubien, a graduate of the University of Manitoba, had joined the firm in 1969 as an actuary student and by 1985 was appointed a vice-president.

Beaubien served as president for a decade, and in February 2005 was succeeded by Ronald Edward Beettam. Prior to joining Equitable, Beettam had spent his whole career with Canada Life, and most recently had been vice-president of the company's American operations. Beettam was president for 16 years, and in July 2021 was succeeded by Fabien Jeudy. Before coming on as president, Jeudy had been with Sun Life in Hong Kong.

In the fall of 2023, Equitable discontinued its historic lighthouse logo and replaced it with a stylised letter E.

== Leadership ==
=== President ===
1. Sydney Charles Tweed, 1920–1932
2. Charles Avery Dunning, 1932–1935
3. James Layton Ralston, 1935–1939
4. Mervyn John Smith, 1939–1967
5. Howard Ezra Power, 1967–1971
6. Thomas Ronald Suttie, 1971–1980
7. Donald Lorne MacLeod, 1981–1987
8. Harvey Ian McIntosh, 1987–1992
9. Peter Haig Williams, 1992–1995
10. Ronald David Beaubien, 1996–2005
11. Ronald Edward Beettam, 2005–2021
12. Fabien Jeudy, 2021–present

=== Chairman of the Board ===
1. Mervyn John Smith, 1967–1968
2. Howard Ezra Power, 1968–1978
3. Thomas Ronald Suttie, 1978–1990
4. Robert John Collins-Wright, 1990–1994
5. John Gerald Weber, 1994–2000
6. Douglas William Dodds, 2000–2016
7. Douglas Stewart Alexander, 2016–2026
8. Andrea Elaine Bolger, 2026–present
