= Equitable Life Building =

Equitable Life Building may refer to:

- Equitable Life Building (Los Angeles)
- Equitable Life Building (Manhattan)
- Equitable Life Building (San Francisco) or 100 Montgomery Street

== See also ==
- Equitable Building (disambiguation)
