= Ernest James Broome =

Canadian politician

Ernest James Broome (July 28, 1908 – January 23, 1975) was a Canadian Progressive Conservative politician and industrial engineer who represented Vancouver South in the House of Commons of Canada from 1957 to 1962.

Parliament of Canada
Preceded by Elmore Philpott; 1953–1957	Member of Parliament for Vancouver South; 1957–1962	Succeeded by Arthur Laing; 1962–1972
