= Associated Gospel Churches of Canada =

Canadian evangelical Christian denomination

Associated Gospel Churches
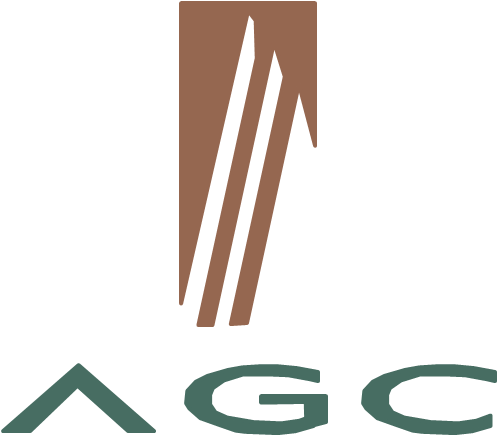
- Classification: Protestant
- Orientation: Evangelical
- Polity: Congregationalist
- Leader: Bill Allan
- Region: Canada
- Headquarters: Burlington, Ontario, Canada
- Origin: c. 1890; Ontario, Canada
- Separated from: Salvation Army (1892)
- Congregations: 142
- Official website: agcofcanada.com

The Associated Gospel Churches, commonly known as AGC, is a Canadian evangelical Christian denomination. It is affiliated with the Evangelical Fellowship of Canada. The national headquarters are located in Burlington, Ontario, Canada.

== History ==
The Associated Gospel Churches began in the 1890s as a group of independent churches made up almost entirely of former Salvationists, in Ontario, Canada, that was joined together by a charter under the leadership of Dr. P. W. Philpott. In 1922, the group was named the Christian Workers' Church of Canada. To differentiate itself from similarly named, but theological differing groups, the denomination was renamed Associated Gospel Churches in 1925. It was federally incorporated March 18, 1925.

The AGC began its first expansion outside of Ontario in 1940, when a group of churches based in Western Canada sought to affiliate themselves with AGC. This group of churches eventually became what is now known as AGC West Region.

In 1944, the AGC began expanding its English language ministries into the Canadian province of Quebec, and began its first French language ministries in 1972.

In 2023, it had 142 churches.

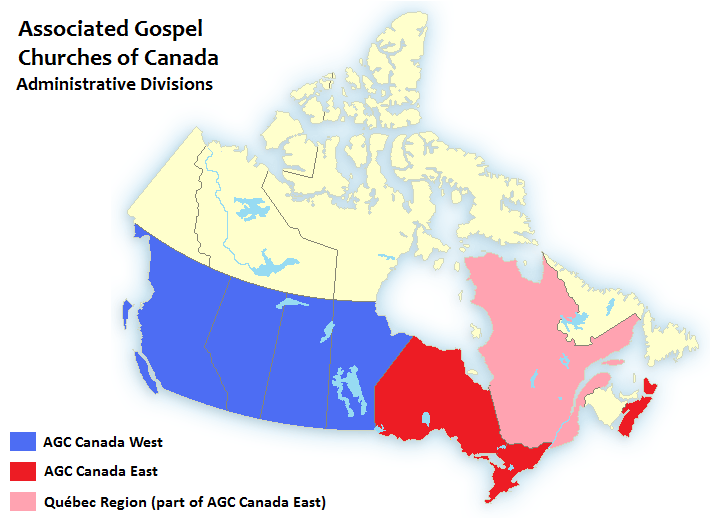
Canadian provinces in which the AGC has member churches

=== Leadership ===
In June 2018, a vote was taken at the AGC National Conference in Niagara Falls, Ontario, with a 99 per cent approval for Bill Allan to become the association's fifth full-time President.

Previous Presidents:

- Bill Fietje (2008-2018)
- Bud Penner (2000-2008)
- Don Hamilton (1989-1998)
- Bill Sifft (1981-1989)

== AGC leadership ==
- Bill Allan - President of AGC
- Tom Lambshead - AGC East Regional Director
- Rob Cochrane - AGC West Regional Director
- Del Gibbons - AGC Quebec Regional Director
- Lorne Meisner - AGC West Associate Regional Director
- John Garner - AGC East Associate Regional Director
- Paul Brittain - National Coordinator of Doctrine & Credentials
