= Sydney Charles Tweed =

Canadian politician

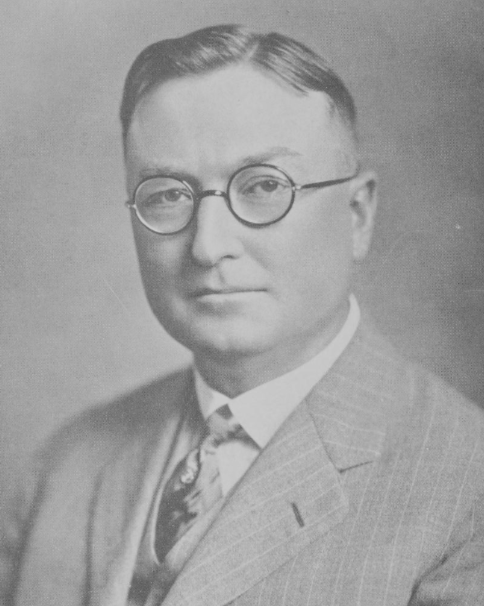

MPP for Waterloo North
- In office September 30, 1929 – April 03, 1934

Personal details
- Born: September 25, 1886 Vankleek Hill, Ontario
- Died: February 8, 1942 (aged 55) Winnipeg, Manitoba
- Party: Ontario Liberal Party

Sydney Charles Tweed (September 25, 1886 – February 8, 1942) was a businessman and political figure in Ontario. He represented Waterloo North in the Legislative Assembly of Ontario from 1929 to 1934 as a Liberal member.

He was born in Vankleek Hill in 1886, the son of William A. Tweed and Alice Sproule, of Irish descent. In 1906, he married Winnifred Hobson. Tweed was president and managing directory of the Ontario Equitable Life and Accident Insurance Co. He served as a member of the Public Utilities Commission for Waterloo from 1926 to 1934. He was nominated for Ontario Liberal Party leader at the 1930 Ontario Liberal leadership convention, but withdrew his name before voting began. He died suddenly at Winnipeg, Manitoba in 1942, and was buried at Brookside Cemetery at that city.
