= Vancouver (electoral districts) =

This page is a listing of federal and provincial electoral districts located in Vancouver, British Columbia, and for districts which include the name Vancouver in their title, including those on Vancouver Island, where the first district named Vancouver was located. For districts in any of the suburbs other than North Vancouver and West Vancouver, please see New Westminster (electoral districts) as all other Lower Mainland ridings are descendants of the original New Westminster district. Vancouver Island districts not including the name "Vancouver" can be found at Vancouver Island (electoral districts).

== Current federal electoral districts ==
In Vancouver:

- Richmond Centre—Marpole (2023–present)
- Vancouver Centre (1914–present)
- Vancouver East (1933–present)
- Vancouver Granville (2013–present)
- Vancouver Kingsway (1952–1987; 1996–present)
- Vancouver Quadra (1947–present)
- Vancouver Fraserview—South Burnaby (2023–present)

Not in Vancouver:

- West Vancouver—Sunshine Coast—Sea to Sky Country (2004–present)
- North Vancouver—Capilano (1987–present)

== Defunct federal electoral districts ==
In Vancouver:

- Burrard (1892–1903): Included coastal and valley areas assigned to Comox—Atlin and Yale—Cariboo in 1903, at which the urban area riding was named Vancouver City. Burrard was restored from 1914 to 1924 as a riding, covering the Burrard Inlet–side wards of Vancouver (excluding downtown) and the North Shore communities, Squamish and Coquitlam. It was succeeded by:
  - Vancouver—Burrard (1924–1966)
  - Vancouver South (1914–1996; 2004–2025)

In addition to Vancouver—Burrard, other urban ridings were:

- Vancouver City (1903–1914)
- Burnaby–Kingsway (1987–1996)
- Vancouver South—Burnaby (1996–2003)

Not in Vancouver:

- Vancouver Island (1871–1872)
- Vancouver (1872–1903): This riding was the successor to the Vancouver Island riding, and did not include the site of the City of Vancouver (which was not named until 1885 to 1886). From 1892, the Burrard riding included the area encompassing the City of Vancouver.
- Vancouver North, British Columbia (1924–1947): Included the North Shore and also much of the rural area north to Pemberton and the Sunshine Coast. Between 1935 and 1947, it also included northern Burnaby and the Tri-Cities.
- North Vancouver—Burnaby, British Columbia (1976–1987)
- West Vancouver—Sunshine Coast (1996–2004)
- Vancouver Island North (1996–2013)

== Current provincial electoral districts ==
=== Vancouver ===
- Vancouver-Fraserview
- Vancouver-Hastings
- Vancouver-Kensington
- Vancouver-Renfrew
- Vancouver-Langara
- Vancouver-Strathcona
- Vancouver-Point Grey
- Vancouver-Quilchena
- Vancouver-West End
- Vancouver-Little Mountain
- Vancouver-South Granville
- Vancouver-Yaletown

=== North Shore ===
- North Vancouver-Lonsdale, since 1991
- North Vancouver-Seymour, since 1966
- West Vancouver-Capilano, since 1991
- West Vancouver-Sea to Sky, since 2009

== Defunct provincial electoral districts ==
=== Vancouver ===
- Vancouver-Burrard, 1933–2005

All of the following were multiple member ridings until 1991

- Vancouver City, 1890–1928
- South Vancouver, 1916–1928
- Vancouver East, 1933–1986
- Vancouver Centre, 1933–1986
- Vancouver-Little Mountain, 1966–1996
- Vancouver South, 1966–1986
- Vancouver-Mount Pleasant
- Vancouver-Kingsway
- Vancouver-False Creek
- Vancouver-Fairview

=== North Shore ===
- North Vancouver, 1916–1963
- North Vancouver-Capilano, 1966–1986
- West Vancouver-Howe Sound, 1966–1986
- West Vancouver–Garibaldi, 1991–2005
