= Results of the 1917 Canadian federal election =

1917 Canadian federal election

== Results by Province ==
=== Alberta ===
Results in Alberta
Party	Seats	Second	Third	Fourth	Votes	%	+/-
Government (Unionist)	11	1			77,912	60.96	
Opposition (Laurier Liberals)	1	9			39,049	30.55	
Opposition-Labour		2			6,379	4.99	
Non-Partisan League			3		2,863	2.24	
Labour			1	1	1,013	0.79	
Independent			1		602	0.47	
Total	12				127,818	100.0	

=== British Columbia ===
Results in British Columbia
Party	Seats	Second	Third	Fourth	Votes	%	+/-
Government (Unionist)	12				73,849	58.41	
Opposition (Laurier Liberals)		12			32,324	25.57	
Government (Liberal–Unionist)	1				12,566	9.94	
Labour			6		7,089	5.61	
Unknown			1	1	601	0.48	
Total	13				126,429	100.0	

=== Manitoba ===
Results in Manitoba
Party	Seats	Second	Votes	%	+/-
Government (Unionist)	14	1	106,858	79.72	
Opposition (Laurier Liberals)	1	11	27,176	20.28	
Total	15		134,034	100.0	

=== New Brunswick ===
Results in New Brunswick
Party	Seats	Second	Third	Votes	%	+/-
Government (Unionist)	6	3		56,593	59.41	
Opposition (Laurier Liberals)	4	5	1	38,668	40.59	
Government (Liberal–Unionist)	1			0	0	
Total	11			95,261	100.0	

=== Nova Scotia ===
Results in Nova Scotia
Party	Seats	Second	Third	Fourth	Fifth	Votes	%	+/-
Government (Unionist)	12	4				57,436	48.36	
Opposition (Laurier Liberals)	4	7	1			54,038	45.5	
Labour				1	1	7,282	6.13	
Total	16					118,756	100.0	

=== Ontario ===
Results in Ontario
Party	Seats	Second	Third	Fourth	Votes	%	+/-
Government (Unionist)	73	7			498,450	61.4	
Opposition (Laurier Liberals)	8	64	4		258,936	31.9	
Labour		1	9		18,257	2.25	
Opposition-Labour		5			14,545	1.79	
Independent		2			9,759	1.2	
Independent Liberal		1			6,313	0.78	
Government (Liberal–Unionist)	1				4,544	0.56	
Unknown			2	1	996	0.12	
Total	82				811,800	100.0	

=== Prince Edward Island ===
Results in Prince Edward Island
Party	Seats	Second	Third	Votes	%	+/-
Opposition (Laurier Liberals)	2	1	1	17,788	50.16	
Government (Unionist)	2	2		17,672	49.84	
Total	4			35,460	100.0	

=== Quebec ===
Results in Quebec
Party	Seats	Second	Third	Votes	%	+/-
Opposition (Laurier Liberals)	62	4		234,092	73.36	
Government (Unionist)	3	38	1	78,744	24.68	
Unknown		2	6	2,226	0.7	
Independent		1	1	1,662	0.52	
Independent Liberal		1		1,440	0.45	
Labour		2		917	0.29	
Total	65			319,081	100.0	

=== Saskatchewan ===
Results in Saskatchewan
Party	Seats	Second	Votes	%	+/-
Government (Unionist)	14	1	76,434	66.51	
Opposition (Laurier Liberals)		10	26,866	23.38	
Government (Liberal–Unionist)	2		8,677	7.55	
Opposition-Labour		1	2,946	2.56	
Total	16		114,923	100.0	

=== Yukon ===
Results in Yukon
Party	Seats	Second	Votes	%	+/-
Government (Unionist)	1		959	54.27	
Opposition (Laurier Liberals)		1	808	45.73	
Total	1		1,767	100.0	
