= Sinclair Centre =

Coordinates: 49.285968°N 123.113868°W

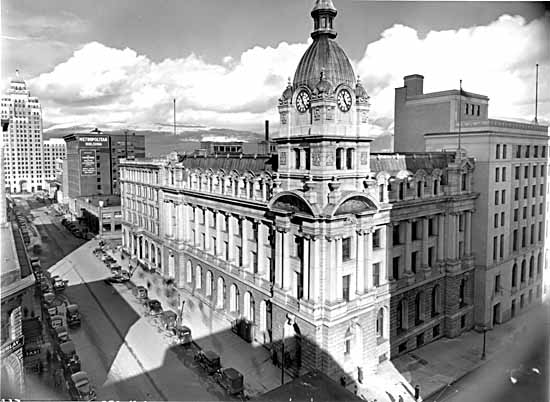
- Vancouver Post Office, c. 1937, now part of the Sinclair Centre complex.
- Location: Downtown Vancouver, British Columbia
- Address: 757 West Hastings Street
- Website: www.sinclaircentre.com

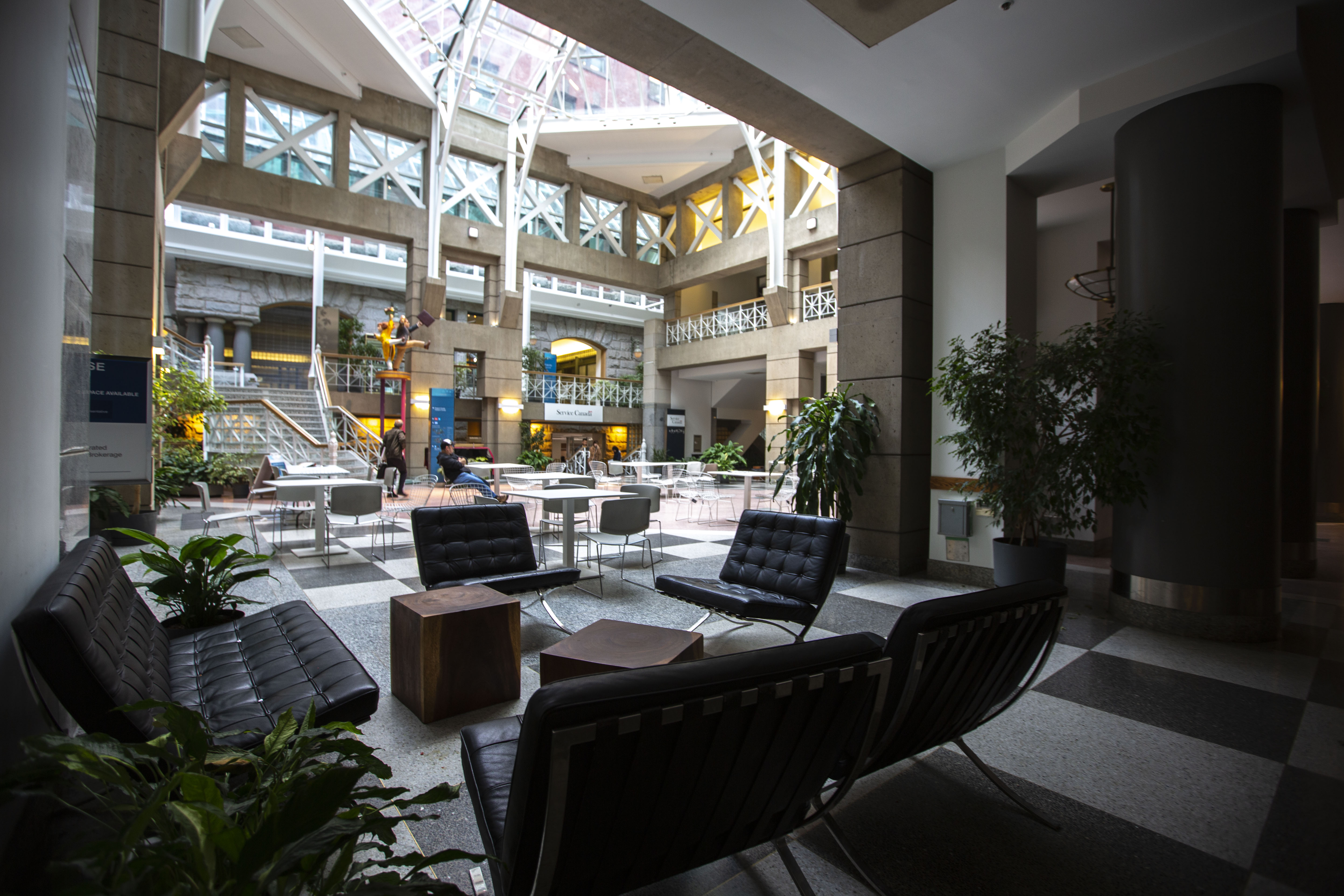
Interior of Sinclair Centre

Sinclair Centre is an upscale shopping mall in Downtown Vancouver, British Columbia. It is located at 757 West Hastings Street between Granville and Howe streets by the Waterfront Station. The centre comprises four buildings that were restored and connected by a new atrium space designed by Henriquez Partners Architects and Toby Russell Buckwell Architects in 1986. The cost for this work was 38 million. The main post office was housed here from 1910 until the new one opened in 1958. The Post Office Building is in an Edwardian Baroque style, combining English and French influences. It features an atrium clock consisting of four 12-foot-diameter (3.7 m) clocks built in 1909 and is the largest clock movement in Western Canada; the minute hands alone weigh 92 kilograms (202 pounds) each. In addition to the mall, the building has a seven floor office tower occupied by the federal government. The buildings that comprise the centre are the Post Office (1910 - David Ewart), the handsome and architecturally esteemed Winch Building (1911 - Thomas Hooper), the Customs Examining Warehouse (1913 - David Ewart), and the Federal Building (1937 - Thomas W. Fuller). The mall is home to elite boutiques. The complex was renovated in 1986 and announced on November 13, 1983 that it was renamed after James Sinclair, member of Parliament for Vancouver North and later Coast—Capilano as well as Minister of Fisheries. Sinclair is the maternal grandfather of 23rd Canadian Prime Minister Justin Trudeau.

== Gallery ==
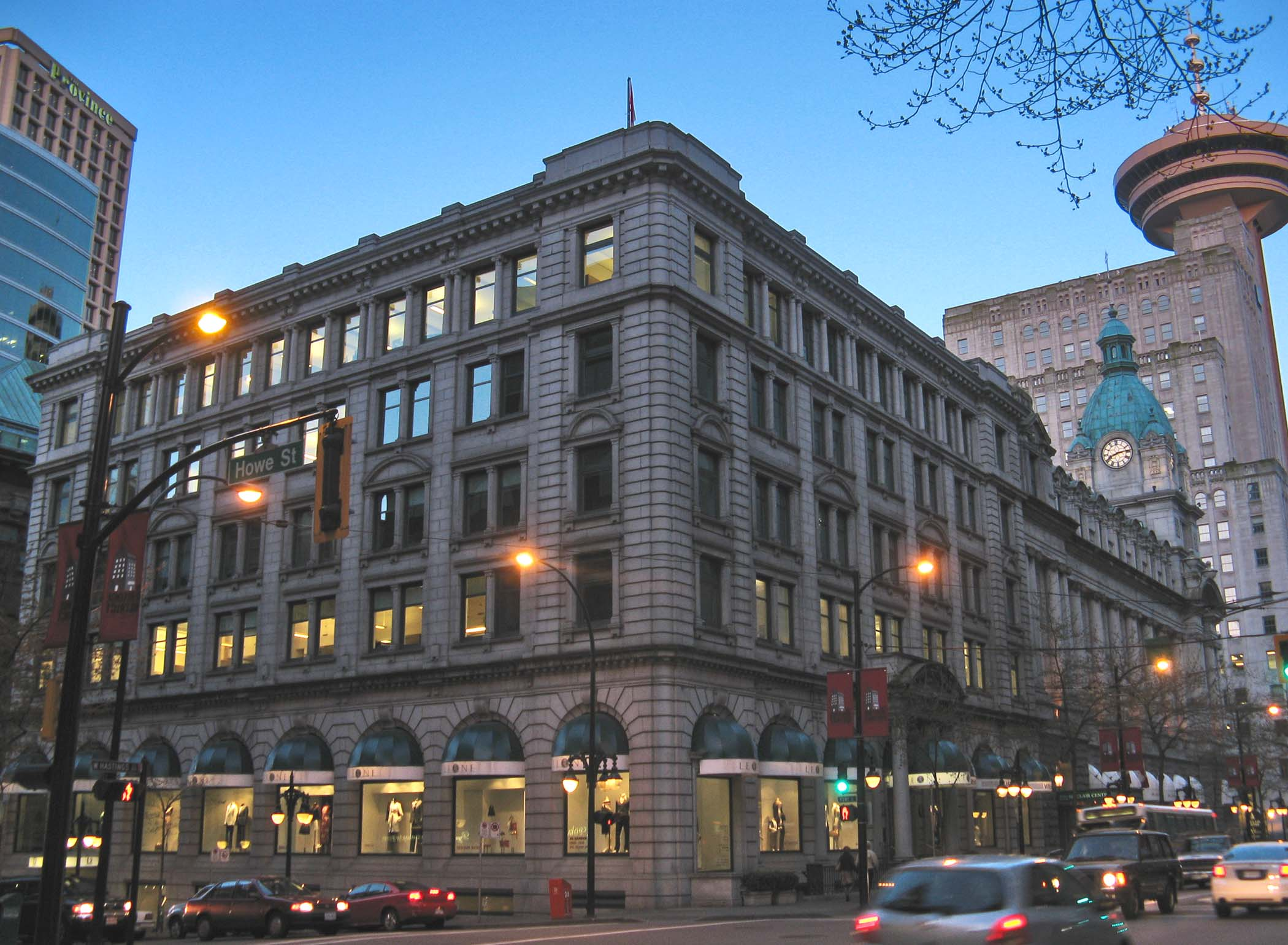
The Winch Building

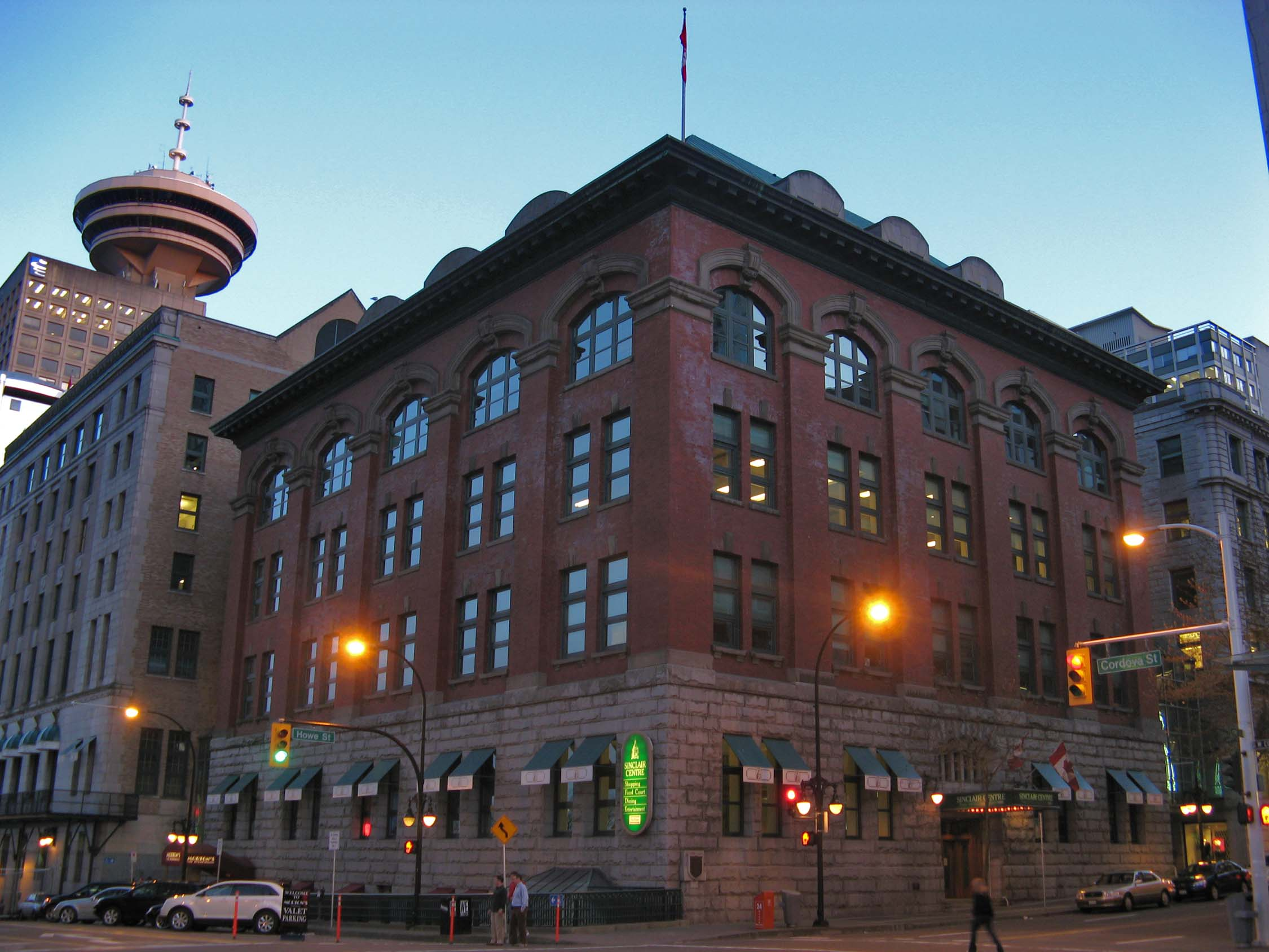
The Customs Examining Warehouse Building

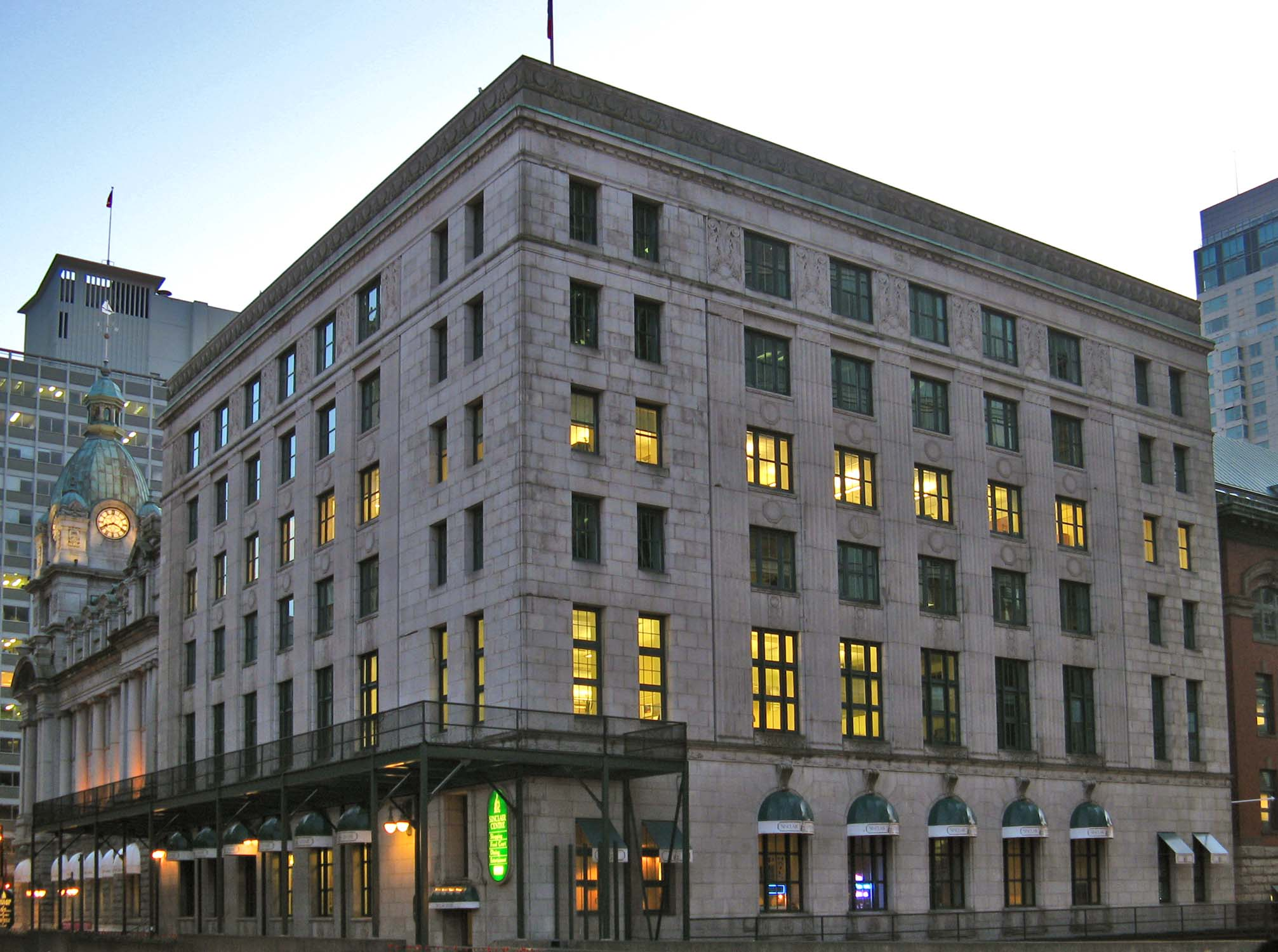
The Federal Building

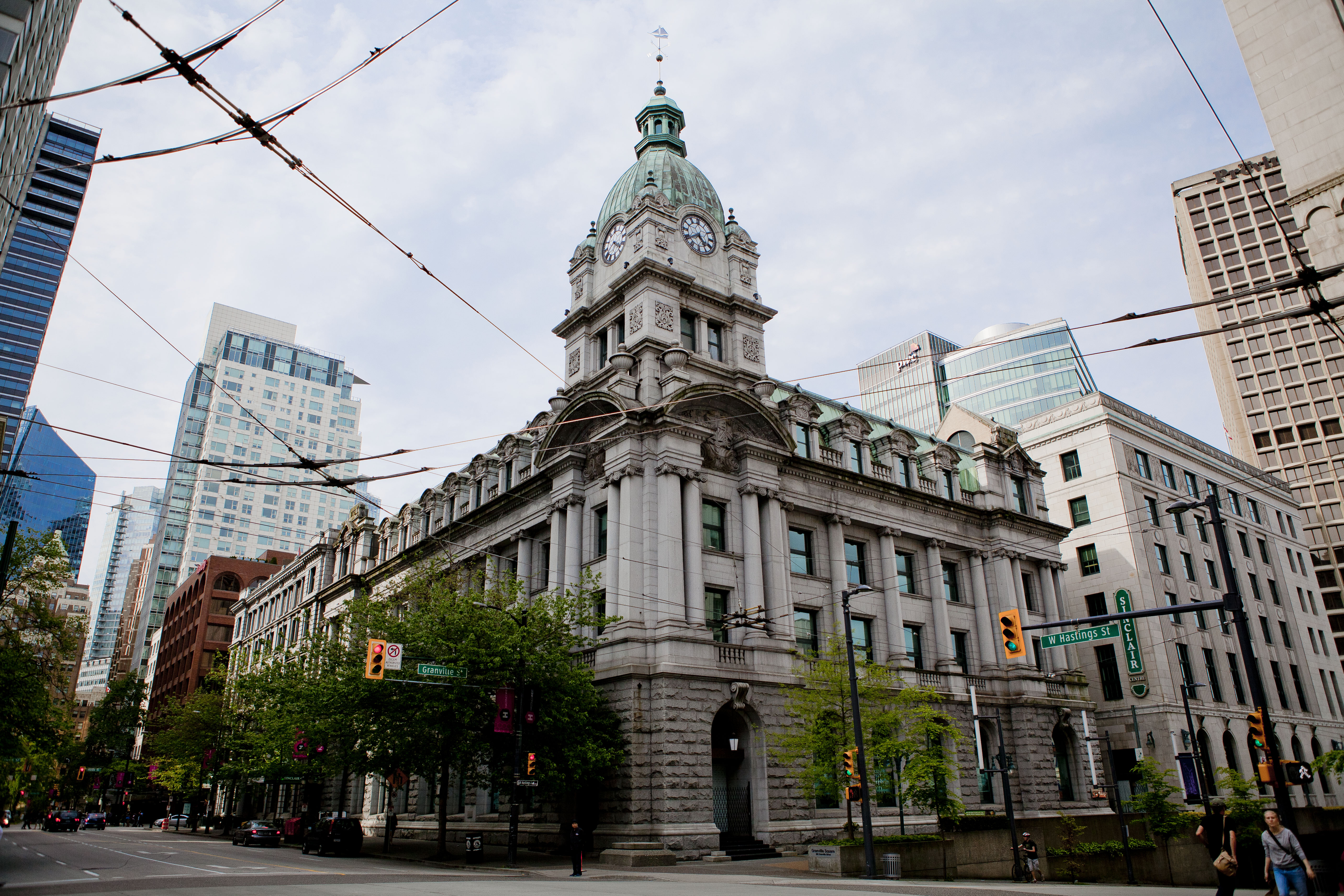
The Post Office building

Close up of tower and columns

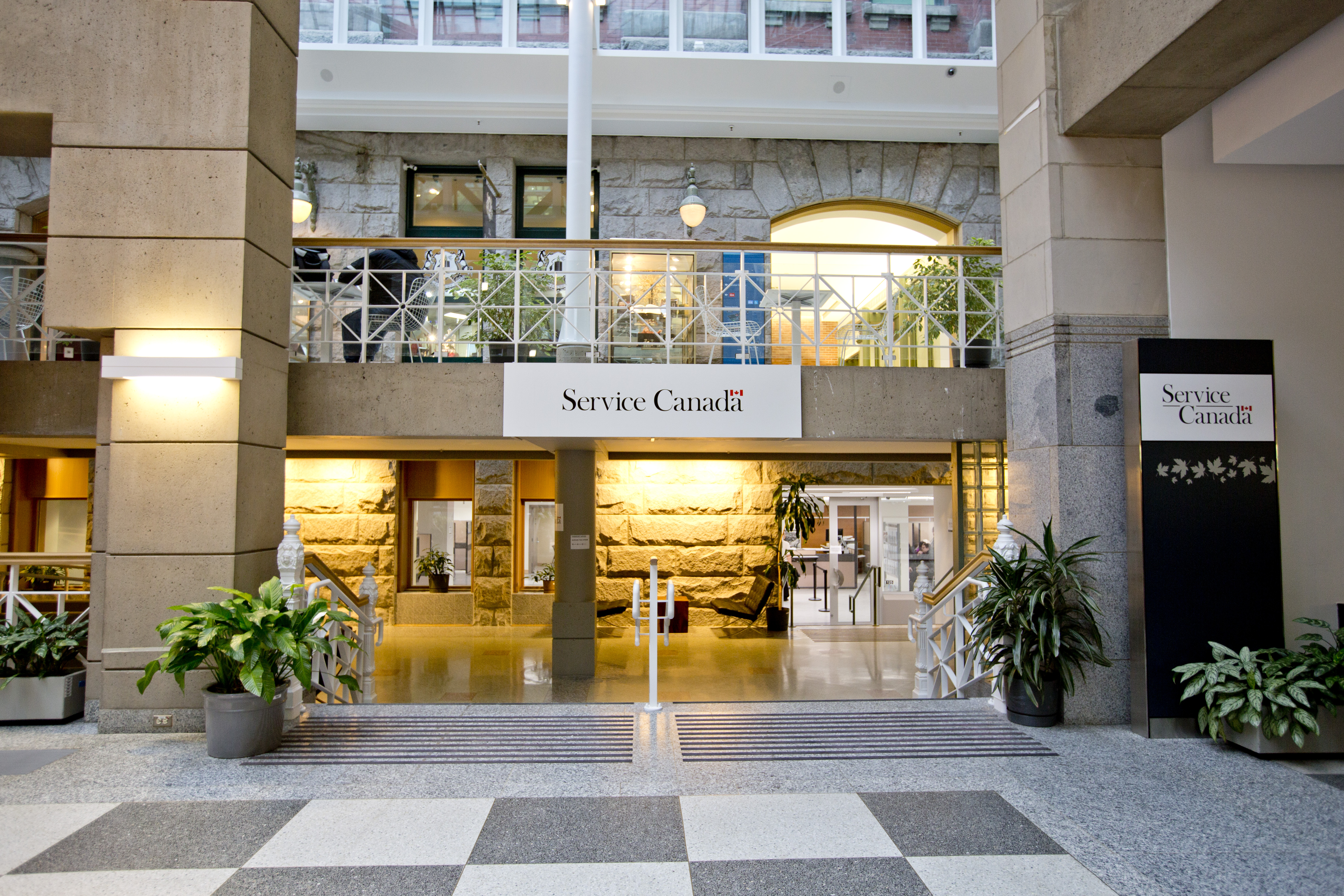
Service Canada inside Sinclair Centre

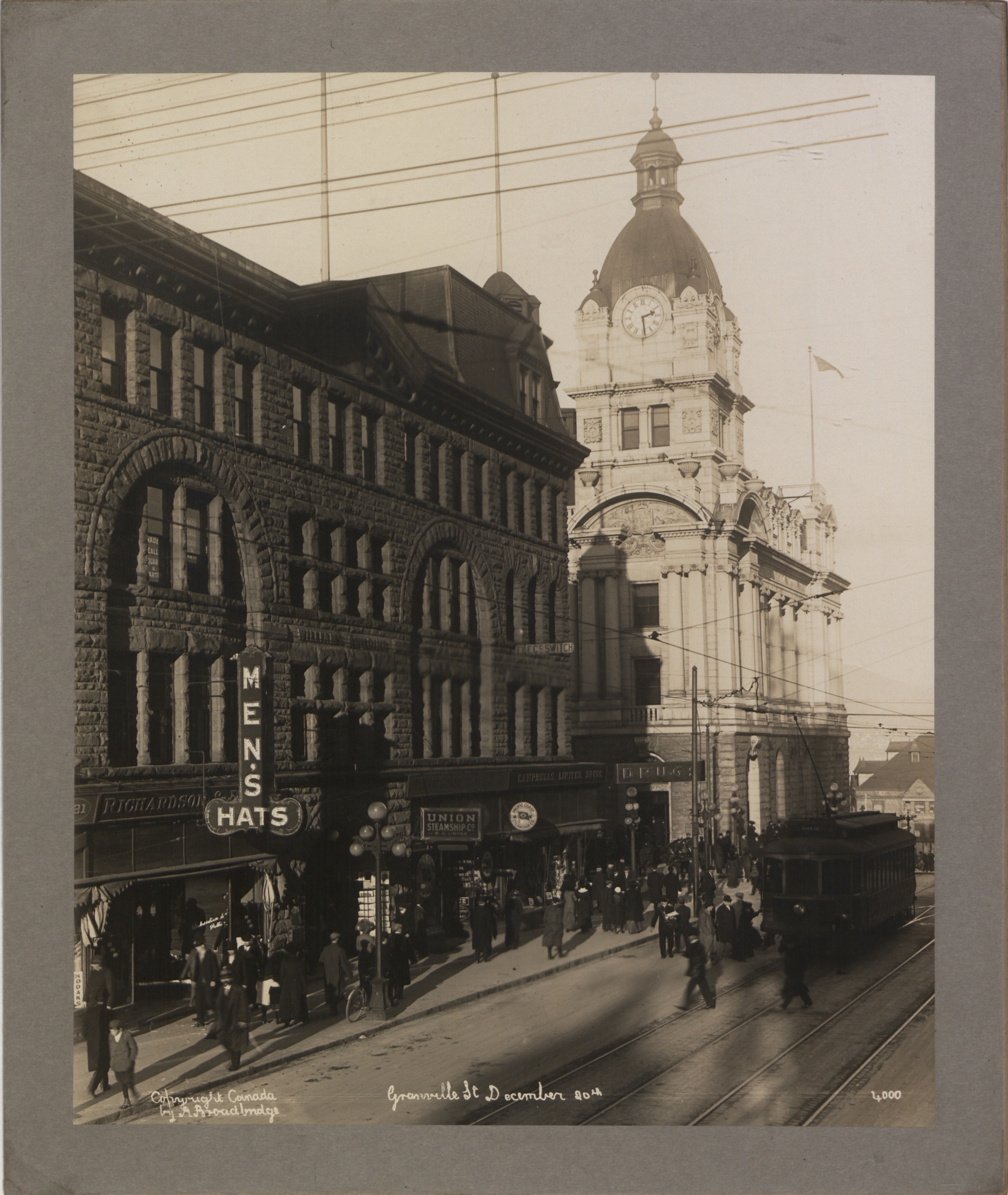
View of NW corner of Granville & West Hastings, December 20, 1912

== See also ==
- Bloody Sunday (1938)
- List of heritage buildings in Vancouver
