= Albert Edward Munn =

Canadian politician

Member of the Legislative Assembly of British Columbia for Lillooet
- In office 1924–1928
- Preceded by: Archibald McDonald
- Succeeded by: Ernest Crawford Carson

Member of Parliament for Vancouver North
- In office July 1930 – October 1935
- Preceded by: Alexander Duncan McRae
- Succeeded by: Charles Grant MacNeil

Personal details
- Born: Albert Edward Munn; 30 January 1865 Trafalgar Township, Canada West
- Died: 22 February 1946 (aged 81)
- Party: Liberal
- Spouse(s): Esther McGill m. 4 January 1892
- Profession: lumber merchant, manager

Albert Edward Munn (30 January 1865 – 22 February 1946) was a Canadian businessman and politician. Munn was a member of the Liberal party in the House of Commons of Canada. He was born in Trafalgar Township, Canada West and became a lumber merchant and manager.

Munn attended school at Otterville, Ontario. He served as a councillor for the city of Orillia, Ontario, for two years.

He later moved to British Columbia and entered provincial politics, becoming a Liberal member of the legislature at the Lillooet riding in the 1924 provincial election. He was defeated by Ernest Crawford Carson in the 1928 provincial election.

Munn was first elected to Parliament at the Vancouver North riding in the 1930 general election. After serving only one term in the 17th Canadian Parliament, he was defeated by Charles Grant MacNeil of the Co-operative Commonwealth Federation in the 1935 election.
