= Sanford Johnston Crowe =

Canadian politician (1868–1931)

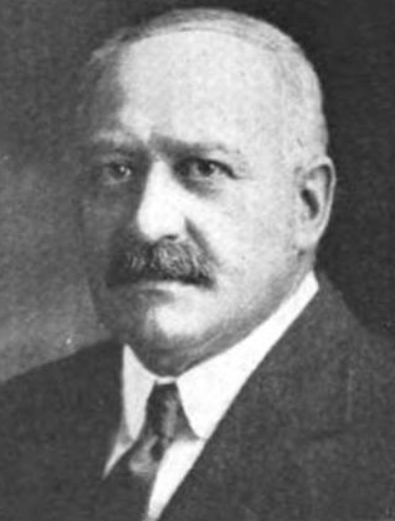

Canadian Senator from British Columbia
- In office 1921 – August 23, 1931

Member of Parliament for Burrard
- In office 1917–1921

Personal details
- Born: February 14, 1868 Truro, Nova Scotia, Canada
- Died: August 23, 1931 (aged 63) Vancouver, British Columbia, Canada
- Party: Liberal-Unionist
- Occupation: Contractor; politician

Sanford Johnston Crowe (February 14, 1868 – August 23, 1931) was a political figure in Vancouver, British Columbia who served in the Parliament of Canada in both the House of Commons and the Senate.

== Background ==
Crowe was born in Truro, Nova Scotia on February 14, 1868, moved to Vancouver in 1888 and became a contractor establishing his own firm with a partner, Crowe and Wilson. He retired in 1909 to enter politics and was elected an alderman on Vancouver City Council serving from 1909 until 1915. He also served as vice-president of the Vancouver Exhibition Association.

He was elected to the House of Commons of Canada in the 1917 wartime election and ran as a Liberal-Unionist supporter of Sir Robert Borden's Government defeating a Laurier Liberal opponent in Vancouver's Burrard electoral district. He was appointed to the Senate of Canada in 1921 by Borden's successor, Arthur Meighen and sat in the upper house until his death in Vancouver on August 23, 1931.

Vancouver's Crowe Street is named after him.
