= Winch Building =

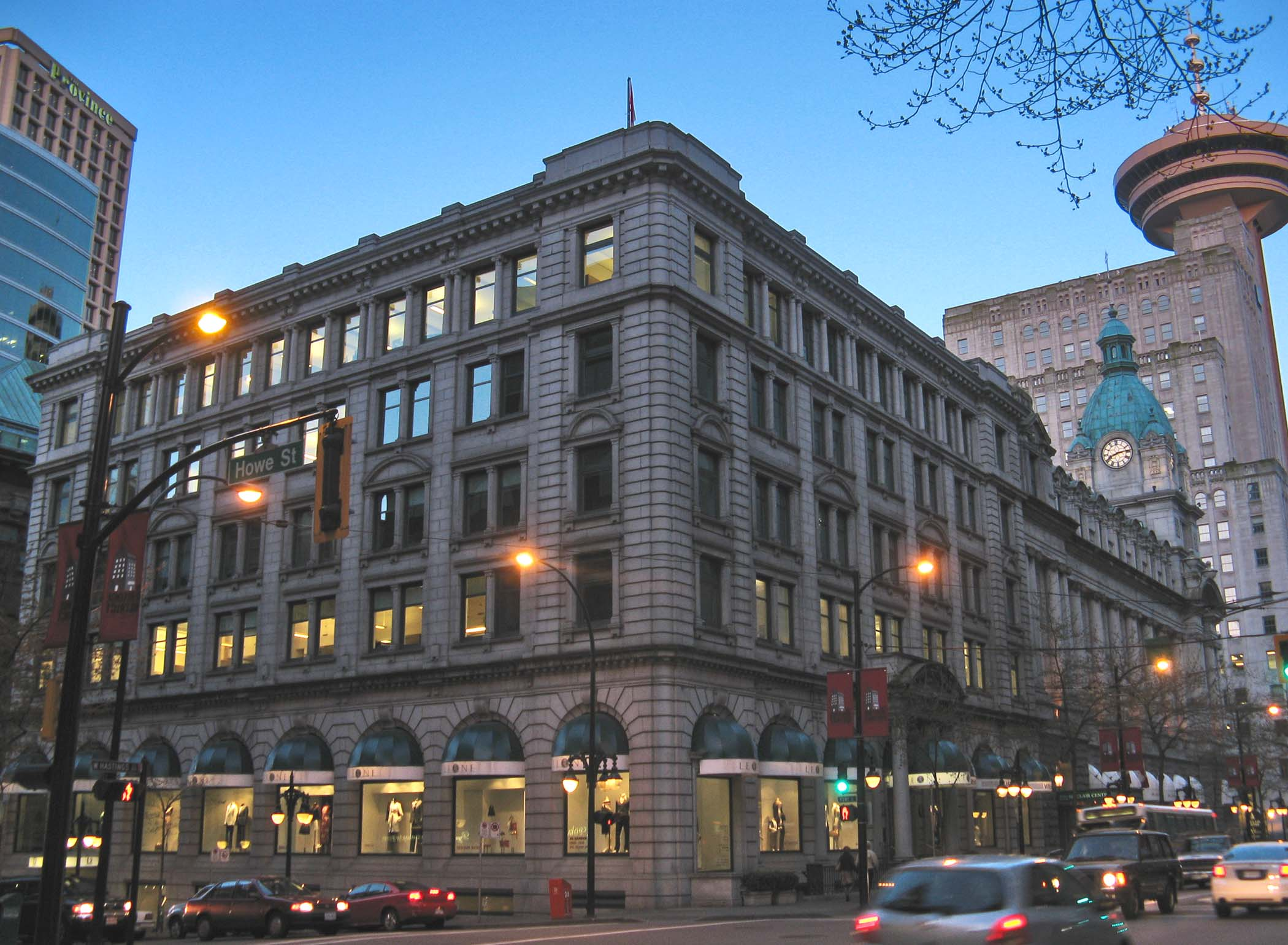
- Interactive map of the Winch Building area
- Alternative names: R.V. Winch Building

General information
- Architectural style: Beaux-Arts Classical
- Location: 739 West Hastings Street, Vancouver, British Columbia, Canada
- Coordinates: 49.2848°N 123.1148°W
- Opened: 1911
- Cost: $700,000
- Owner: Government of Canada

Technical details
- Floor count: 5

Design and construction
- Architects: Thomas Hooper (Hooper & Watkins)

The Winch Building (also known as the R.V. Winch Building) is a five-storey heritage commercial building located at 739 West Hastings Street in downtown Vancouver, British Columbia, Canada. Completed in 1911, it was designed by architect Thomas Hooper of the firm Hooper & Watkins in the Beaux-Arts Classical style for shipping and canning magnate Richard Vance Winch. The building was Vancouver's first steel-cage construction and was described at the time of its completion as "an entirely modern Class A office building, the first of its kind in British Columbia."

Since 1986, the Winch Building has formed part of the Sinclair Centre, a complex of four heritage buildings connected by a glass atrium. It is a Recognized Federal Heritage Building and is listed on the Canadian Register of Historic Places. The building is also listed on the Vancouver Heritage Register with municipal and national heritage protection.

== History ==
=== Construction ===
R.V. Winch commissioned Thomas Hooper to design the building. Hooper had previously designed the Winch Block in Vancouver in 1889. Construction began in 1908 and lasted three years, with the building opening in 1911. The final construction cost was approximately $700,000.

The Winch Building was the first building in Vancouver to employ steel-cage construction—a structural steel frame encased in concrete, resting on granite piers—and has been described as British Columbia's first fireproofed steel-frame office building. The structure featured reinforced concrete floors supported by steel beams connected to steel columns embedded in masonry walls.

=== Federal government ownership ===
By the 1920s, an increasing number of offices in the building were rented by the federal government. The Government of Canada assumed custodianship of the building in 1925.

=== Sinclair Centre incorporation ===
In 1983, the Winch Building and three adjacent federal heritage buildings were collectively renamed as the Sinclair Centre, after James Sinclair. In 1986, a $38-million renovation designed by Henriquez Partners Architects and Toby Russell Buckwell Architects connected the four buildings via a glass atrium, creating a unified complex of offices and retail space. The renovation received the RAIC Governor General's Medal in Architecture (Merit) in 1990, the AIBC Lieutenant-Governor Honour Award in 1988, and a City of Vancouver Heritage Award in 1988.

== Architecture ==
=== Design and style ===
The Winch Building was designed by Thomas Hooper of the firm Hooper & Watkins in the Beaux-Arts Classical style. It has been described as "the most ornate and sophisticated of Thomas Hooper's commercial designs" and marked his first major work incorporating steel and concrete construction.

The five-storey building features a symmetrical façade composition. The ground floor has arched windows, while the upper storeys have paired windows framed by engaged columns. Full-height rusticated corner pilasters surround the first windows on each corner and project above the cornice to a parapet. A deep decorative cornice and oversized classical columns are prominent elements of the façade. The main entrance features a pediment of cut stone bearing the initials of the original owner.

=== Materials ===
The structural frame consists of steel encased in concrete, supported on granite piers. The building originally contained 130 offices.

== Architect ==
Thomas Hooper (1859–1935) was one of the most prominent and prolific architects in British Columbia, practising for nearly forty years. He maintained offices in both Vancouver and Victoria and practised under various firm names, including Hooper & Goddard (1890–1891), Thomas Hooper (1891–1914), and Hooper & Watkins (with C. Elwood Watkins, c. 1902–1910). His notable works include the Metropolitan Methodist Church in Victoria and the David Spencer department store in Vancouver. The Winch Building is considered the finest of his commercial designs.

== Heritage recognition ==
The Winch Building was designated a Recognized Federal Heritage Building by the Federal Heritage Buildings Review Office (FHBRO) on 15 July 1983, under the Treasury Board Policy on Management of Real Property. It was listed on the Canadian Register of Historic Places on 13 January 2006. The building is also listed on the Vancouver Heritage Register with both municipal and national heritage protection.

The building's heritage value is recognised for its historical associations with R.V. Winch and with the development of Vancouver's commercial core, its architectural significance as an early example of fireproofed steel-frame construction and as a distinguished work of the Beaux-Arts Classical style, and its environmental value as a contributing element of the West Hastings Street streetscape.

=== Conservation concerns ===
In 2015, the federal government submitted a rezoning enquiry to Vancouver City Council seeking to increase the floor space ratio on the Sinclair Centre site from 5:1 to between 17:1 and 20:1 to accommodate a high-rise office tower above the heritage complex. A City of Vancouver staff report warned that a significant addition could result in the loss of portions or all of one or two of the heritage buildings due to the seismic upgrades and structural reinforcement required to support the additional weight.

Heritage Vancouver placed the Sinclair Centre on its Top 10 Watch List in 2017, citing concerns about the proposed development's impact on the heritage buildings. In 2017, the National Trust for Canada declared the complex one of Canada's Top 10 Endangered Places, noting that Canada is the only G8 country without laws to protect historic places owned by its national government.

== Richard Vance Winch ==
Richard Vance Winch was originally from Cobourg, Ontario.

=== Business career ===
In 1893, Winch became a partner in the Canadian Pacific Canning Company on the Fraser River. Through R.V. Winch and Company, formed from the acquisition of the Victoria-based Robert Ward and Company, Winch subsequently engaged in shipping, insurance, and real estate, and served as consular representative for Norway and Sweden in Vancouver.

=== Later life ===
Winch died in 1952 at the age of 89.

== Sinclair Centre complex ==
The Winch Building is one of four heritage buildings forming the Sinclair Centre, which occupies the full block bounded by Granville, Hastings, Howe, and Cordova streets:

Building	Date	Architect	Style
Former Main Post Office	1905–1910	David Ewart	Edwardian Baroque
R.V. Winch Building	1908–1911	Thomas Hooper / Hooper & Watkins	Beaux-Arts Classical
Customs Examining Warehouse	1911–1913	David Ewart	Classical
Federal Building (Post Office Extension)	1935–1937	Thomas W. Fuller	Modern Classicism

The complex was named after James Sinclair, who was also the father of Margaret Trudeau.

== Current status ==
The Sinclair Centre complex began to be vacated in 2024 in preparation for a major redevelopment estimated at over $500 million. The project, a public-private partnership, proposes to construct a tower of up to 22 additional storeys above the existing heritage buildings, increasing total floor area to approximately 1.1 million square feet. The four heritage buildings are to be preserved as a podium with seismic and mechanical upgrades, and the completed facility is intended to accommodate over 6,000 federal workers. Construction is projected to begin in 2026, with completion estimated for 2030–2031.

== See also ==
- Sinclair Centre
- Thomas Hooper
- List of heritage buildings in Vancouver
- James Sinclair (politician)
- Hastings Street (Vancouver)
