= William Hector Payne =

Canadian politician

Member of Parliament for Coast-Capilano
- In office March 1958 – June 1962
- Preceded by: James Sinclair
- Succeeded by: Jack Davis

Personal details
- Born: 5 July 1914 Red Deer, Alberta
- Died: 18 April 1989 (aged 74)
- Party: Progressive Conservative
- Profession: insurance agent, sales manager

William Hector Payne (5 July 1914 – 18 April 1989) was a Progressive Conservative party member of the House of Commons of Canada. He was an insurance agent and sales manager by career.

He was first elected at the Coast—Capilano riding in the 1958 general election defeating Liberal incumbent James Sinclair. Payne made a previous unsuccessful attempt to win the riding in the 1957 election. After serving his only term, the 24th Parliament, Payne lost Coast—Capilano to Liberal candidate Jack Davis in the 1962 election.
