= Coast—Capilano =

Former federal electoral district in British Columbia, Canada

British Columbia electoral district

Defunct federal electoral district
- Legislature: House of Commons
- District created: 1947
- District abolished: 1966
- First contested: 1949
- Last contested: 1965

Coast—Capilano was a federal electoral district in British Columbia, Canada, that was represented in the House of Commons of Canada from 1949 to 1968. This riding was created in 1947 from parts of Vancouver North riding.

The riding consisted of Vancouver's North Shore suburbs, the then-municipality of West Vancouver (now a city) and the city and the western part of the district municipality of North Vancouver plus the mainland Sunshine Coast areas of the former Comox—Atlin riding.

== Members of Parliament ==
Parliament	Years	Member	Party
Riding created from Vancouver North
21st	1949–1953	James Sinclair	Liberal
22nd	1953–1957	James Sinclair	Liberal
23rd	1957–1958	James Sinclair	Liberal
24th	1958–1962	William Hector Payne	Progressive Conservative
25th	1962–1963	Jack Davis	Liberal
26th	1963–1965	Jack Davis	Liberal
27th	1965–1968	Jack Davis	Liberal
Riding dissolved into Burnaby—Seymour, Capilano and Coast Chilcotin

== Election results ==
=== 1965 ===
1965 Canadian federal election
Party	Candidate	Votes	%	±%
Liberal	Jack Davis	26,472	48.58	–1.79
New Democratic	William H. Deverell	12,335	22.64	+0.89
Progressive Conservative	Carlyle Boyd Shannon	8,429	15.47	–3.45
Social Credit	Harold Hunter	6,525	11.97	+4.26
Communist	Charles Caron	733	1.35	+0.08
Total valid votes		54,494	99.59	
Total rejected ballots		227	0.41	+0.05
Turnout		54,721	76.12	–6.35
Eligible voters		71,890		
Liberal hold		Swing		–1.34
Source: Library of Parliament

=== 1963 ===
1963 Canadian federal election
Party	Candidate	Votes	%	±%
Liberal	Jack Davis	27,177	50.37	+4.27
New Democratic	Peter S. Faminow	11,731	21.74	+0.18
Progressive Conservative	Mary Southin	10,206	18.92	–4.47
Social Credit	James Thornton Fullerton	4,160	7.71	–1.25
Communist	Charles Caron	682	1.26	–
Total valid votes		53,956	99.63	
Total rejected ballots		199	0.37	–0.17
Turnout		54,155	82.47	+1.54
Eligible voters		65,669		
Liberal hold		Swing		+2.05
Source: Library of Parliament

=== 1962 ===
1962 Canadian federal election
Party	Candidate	Votes	%	±%
Liberal	Jack Davis	23,583	46.09	+6.96
Progressive Conservative	William Hector Payne	11,966	23.39	–20.09
New Democratic	Hugh Clifford	11,030	21.56	+7.77
Social Credit	Vincent H. Bracewell	4,584	8.96	+5.37
Total valid votes		51,163	99.46	
Total rejected ballots		277	0.54	+0.07
Turnout		51,440	80.93	+1.41
Eligible voters		63,563		
Liberal gain from Progressive Conservative		Swing		+13.52
Source: Library of Parliament

=== 1958 ===
1958 Canadian federal election
Party	Candidate	Votes	%	±%
Progressive Conservative	William Hector Payne	19,343	43.48	+15.85
Liberal	James Sinclair	17,411	39.14	+0.12
Co-operative Commonwealth	Hugh Clifford	6,134	13.79	+1.59
Social Credit	Edward Gallant	1,599	3.59	–17.56
Total valid votes		44,487	99.53	
Total rejected ballots		211	0.47	–0.19
Turnout		44,698	79.52	+1.69
Eligible voters		56,211		
Progressive Conservative gain from Liberal		Swing		+7.87
Source: Library of Parliament

=== 1957 ===
1957 Canadian federal election
Party	Candidate	Votes	%	±%
Liberal	James Sinclair	16,443	39.02	–6.86
Progressive Conservative	William Hector Payne	11,643	27.63	+17.73
Social Credit	Evelyn M. Fingarson	8,918	21.16	–2.74
Co-operative Commonwealth	Hugh Clifford	5,140	12.20	–5.87
Total valid votes		42,144	99.34	
Total rejected ballots		282	0.66	+0.18
Turnout		42,426	77.83	+10.32
Eligible voters		54,512		
Liberal hold		Swing		–12.30
Source: Library of Parliament

=== 1953 ===
1953 Canadian federal election
Party	Candidate	Votes	%	±%
Liberal	James Sinclair	13,614	45.88	–12.37
Social Credit	Ernest Gustav Silverton	7,092	23.90	–
Co-operative Commonwealth	Robert Bryce	5,361	18.07	–5.75
Progressive Conservative	Arthur Archibald McArthur	2,936	9.89	–8.05
Labor–Progressive	Tom McEwen	673	2.27	–
Total valid votes		29,676	99.51	
Total rejected ballots		146	0.49	–0.16
Turnout		29,822	67.51	–3.10
Eligible voters		44,177		
Liberal hold		Swing		–26.76
Source: Library of Parliament

=== 1949 ===
1949 Canadian federal election
Party	Candidate	Votes	%	±%
Liberal	James Sinclair	15,294	58.24	–
Co-operative Commonwealth	Francis James McKenzie	6,253	23.81	–
Progressive Conservative	Harold S. Mahon	4,713	17.95	–
Total valid votes		26,260	99.35	
Total rejected ballots		172	0.65	–
Turnout		26,432	70.61	–
Eligible voters		37,434		
Liberal notional hold		Swing		
This riding was created from parts of Vancouver North, where Liberal James Sinclair was the incumbent.
Source: Library of Parliament

== See also ==
- List of Canadian electoral districts
- Historical federal electoral districts of Canada
