= Robert George Macpherson =

Canadian politician

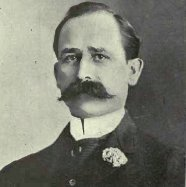

Member of the Canadian Parliament for Burrard
- In office 1903–1904
- Preceded by: George Ritchie Maxwell
- Succeeded by: Electoral district was abolished in 1903

Member of the Canadian Parliament for Vancouver City
- In office 1904–1908
- Preceded by: Electoral district was created in 1903
- Succeeded by: George Henry Cowan

Personal details
- Born: January 28, 1866 Erin Township, Canada West
- Died: November 27, 1926 (aged 60)
- Party: Liberal

Robert George Macpherson (January 28, 1866 – November 27, 1926) was a Canadian Liberal pharmacist and politician.

Born in Erin, Wellington county, Canada West, Robert George Macpherson's grandfather, Hugh Macpherson, was a native of Islay an island off the west coast of Scotland, who emigrated to Canada in 1858 with Robert George's father, Archibald. Macpherson's mother was Jeannette Hall, a native of Wellington county. Macpherson attended Arthur public school and complemented his education at Gait Collegiate Institute.

Early in life he became connected with the drug business. Gaining a comprehensive knowledge of that trade, he settled in New Westminster, British Columbia and worked there from 1888 to 1895. He was president of the British Columbia Pharmaceutical Association.

He was first elected in a 1903 by-election in the Burrard riding, and was re-elected in 1904 in Vancouver City, which he represented until 1908. In 1925 he attempted a return to the House, running in Vancouver South, but was defeated by the incumbent Leon Johnson Ladner. In 1909 he has appointed postmaster of Vancouver.

He was honorary president of the Vancouver Lacrosse Club, one of the founders of the Vancouver Canadian Club, and was contributor to Canadian magazines.

In 1890, Macpherson married Susan Van Aken, who was born in Coldwater, Michigan. They had three children, Brita, Bessie and Archie, all of whom were born in British Columbia. They were members of St. John's Presbyterian Church.
