= James Sinclair (politician) =

Canadian politician

The Honourable James Sinclair PC
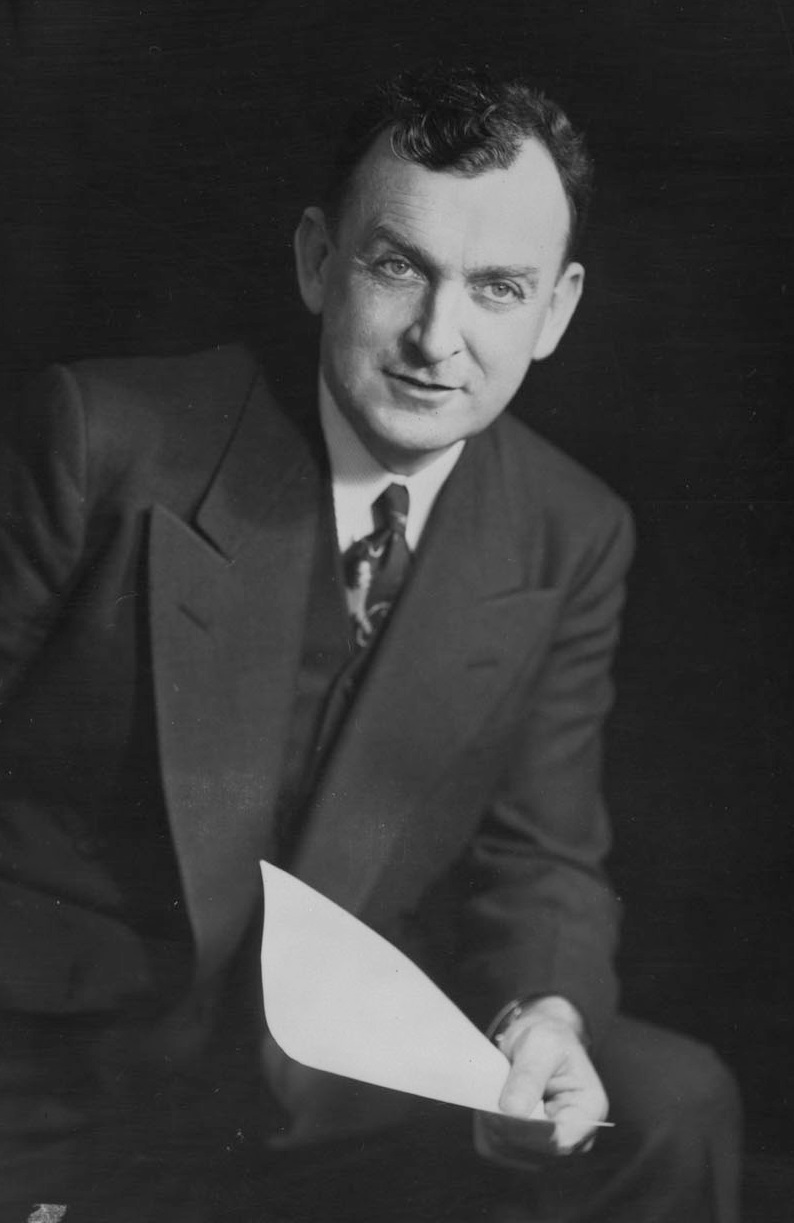

Minister of Fisheries
- In office 15 October 1952 – 21 June 1957
- Prime Minister: Louis St. Laurent
- Preceded by: Robert Mayhew
- Succeeded by: Angus MacLean

Member of Parliament for Coast-Capilano
- In office 27 June 1949 – 30 March 1958
- Preceded by: Riding created
- Succeeded by: William Hector Payne

Member of Parliament for Vancouver North
- In office 26 March 1940 – 26 June 1949
- Preceded by: Charles Grant MacNeil
- Succeeded by: Riding dissolved

Personal details
- Born: 26 May 1908 Grange, Scotland, United Kingdom
- Died: 7 February 1984 (aged 75) West Vancouver, British Columbia, Canada
- Party: Liberal
- Spouse: Doris Kathleen Bernard (m. 1940)
- Children: 5, including Margaret
- Relatives: Trudeau family
- Education: University of British Columbia; St John's College, Oxford; Princeton University
- Occupation: Civil Engineer

James Sinclair PC (26 May 1908 – 7 February 1984) was a British-born Canadian politician and businessman. He was the maternal grandfather of former Canadian Prime Minister Justin Trudeau.

== Early life ==
Sinclair was born in Grange, the son of James George Sinclair and Betsy Sinclair (née Ross). He moved to Vancouver with his family in 1911 where his father, who had already immigrated a year earlier, was among the founders of Vancouver Technical Secondary School, the area's first vocational school, and served as the school's second principal from 1930 until 1944. Sinclair studied engineering at the University of British Columbia and was awarded a Rhodes scholarship in 1928 to study mathematics at St John's College, in the University of Oxford. He also studied mathematical physics at Princeton University. During World War II, he served with the Royal Canadian Air Force in North Africa, Malta, and Sicily as a squadron leader.

== Career ==
He was first elected to the House of Commons of Canada representing the riding of Vancouver North in the 1940 federal election. A Liberal, he was re-elected in 1945 in the riding of Vancouver North, and in 1949, 1953, and 1957 in the riding of Coast-Capilano. He was defeated in the 1958 federal election. From 1949 to 1952, he was the Parliamentary Assistant to the Minister of Finance. From 1952 to 1957, he was the Minister of Fisheries. He was one of the first to make a mission to the Soviet Union, in 1955. At that occasion he was injured. He invited Alexander Ishkov, his soviet colleague, to visit Canada in 1956.

From 1958 to 1960, he was the President of the Fisheries Association of British Columbia. From 1960 to 1970, he was president and Chairman of Lafarge Cement of North America. He was also a director of the Bank of Montreal and of Canadian Industries limited. He took part in the economic mission headed by Charles Drury with people such as Paul Desmarais, Yves Dubé, Marcel Faribeault to France in June 1966. From 1970 to 1973 he was Deputy Chairman of Canada Cement Lafarge Limited. In 1978, according to testimony in the trial of four murdered teenagers, their killings were part of a failed attempted scheme to kidnap four prominent Vancouver-area families including James Sinclair's.

== Personal life ==
Sinclair was married in Saint Stephen's Anglican Church, West Vancouver on 2 November 1940 to Doris Kathleen Bernard (11 February 1920; Penticton, British Columbia – 29 March 2012; Saanich, British Columbia). They had five daughters. His fourth daughter was Margaret Joan Trudeau née Sinclair, one-time wife of the 15th Canadian Prime Minister Pierre Trudeau and mother of 23rd Canadian Prime Minister Justin Trudeau, Alexandre Trudeau and Michel Trudeau. Many, including Jean Chrétien and Justin Trudeau himself, have noted the family resemblance in physical appearance between Sinclair and Justin Trudeau. Sinclair is also the namesake of both Justin Trudeau (whose middle name is James) and Xavier James Trudeau, son of Justin Trudeau and Sophie Grégoire Trudeau.

He died in 1984 of a myocardial infarction at his home in West Vancouver.

The Sinclair Centre, a shopping complex in downtown Vancouver, is named after him.

Parliament of Canada
Preceded by Charles Grant MacNeil	Member of the Canadian Parliament for Vancouver North; 1940–1949	Succeeded by Riding was abolished in 1947
Preceded by Riding was created in 1947	Member of the Canadian Parliament for Coast—Capilano; 1949–1958	Succeeded by William Hector Payne
