= Vancouver City (federal electoral district) =

Former federal electoral district in British Columbia, Canada

British Columbia electoral district

Defunct federal electoral district
- Legislature: House of Commons
- District created: 1904
- District abolished: 1917
- First contested: 1904
- Last contested: 1911

Vancouver City was a federal electoral district in British Columbia, Canada, that was represented in the House of Commons of Canada from 1904 to 1917.

This riding was created in 1903 from parts of Burrard riding. It was abolished in 1914 when it was redistributed into Burrard, Vancouver Centre and Vancouver South ridings.

== Members of Parliament ==
Parliament	Years	Member	Party
Riding created from Burrard
10th	1904–1908	Robert George Macpherson	Liberal
11th	1908–1911	George Henry Cowan	Conservative
12th	1911–1917	Henry Herbert Stevens	Conservative
Riding dissolved into Burrard, Vancouver Centre and Vancouver South

== Election results ==
1911 Canadian federal election
Party	Candidate	Votes	%	±%
Conservative	Henry Herbert Stevens	6,902	58.72	+16.61
Liberal	John Harold Senkler	3,796	32.30	+4.60
Socialist	Eugene Thornton Kingsley	1,056	8.98	–1.90
Total valid votes		11,754	100.00	
Total rejected ballots		–		
Turnout		11,754	51.23	–5.72
Eligible voters		22,944		
Conservative hold		Swing		+5.75
Socialist candidate Eugene Kingsley lost 1.76 percentage points from his 1908 performance as an independent.
Source: Library of Parliament

1908 Canadian federal election
Party	Candidate	Votes	%	±%
Conservative	George Henry Cowan	4,621	42.11	+6.30
Liberal	William Wallace Burns McInnes	3,039	27.69	–22.88
Independent	Joseph Martin	2,120	19.32	–
Independent	Eugene Thornton Kingsley	1,194	10.88	–
Total valid votes		10,974	100.00	
Total rejected ballots		–		
Turnout		10,974	56.95	–5.38
Eligible voters		19,271		
Conservative gain from Liberal		Swing		+14.60
Source: Library of Parliament

1904 Canadian federal election
Party	Candidate	Votes	%	±%
Liberal	Robert George Macpherson	2,938	50.58	–
Conservative	R.B. Ellis	2,080	35.81	–
Socialist	John T. Mortimer	741	12.76	–
Unknown	J. McGeer	50	0.86	–
Total valid votes		5,809	100.00	
Total rejected ballots		–		
Turnout		5,809	62.33	–
Eligible voters		9,320		
This riding was created from parts of Burrard, where Liberal Robert George Macpherson was the incumbent.
Source: Library of Parliament

== See also ==
- List of Canadian electoral districts
- Historical federal electoral districts of Canada
