= Alexander Duncan McRae =

Canadian politician

The Honourable Alexander Duncan McRae CB
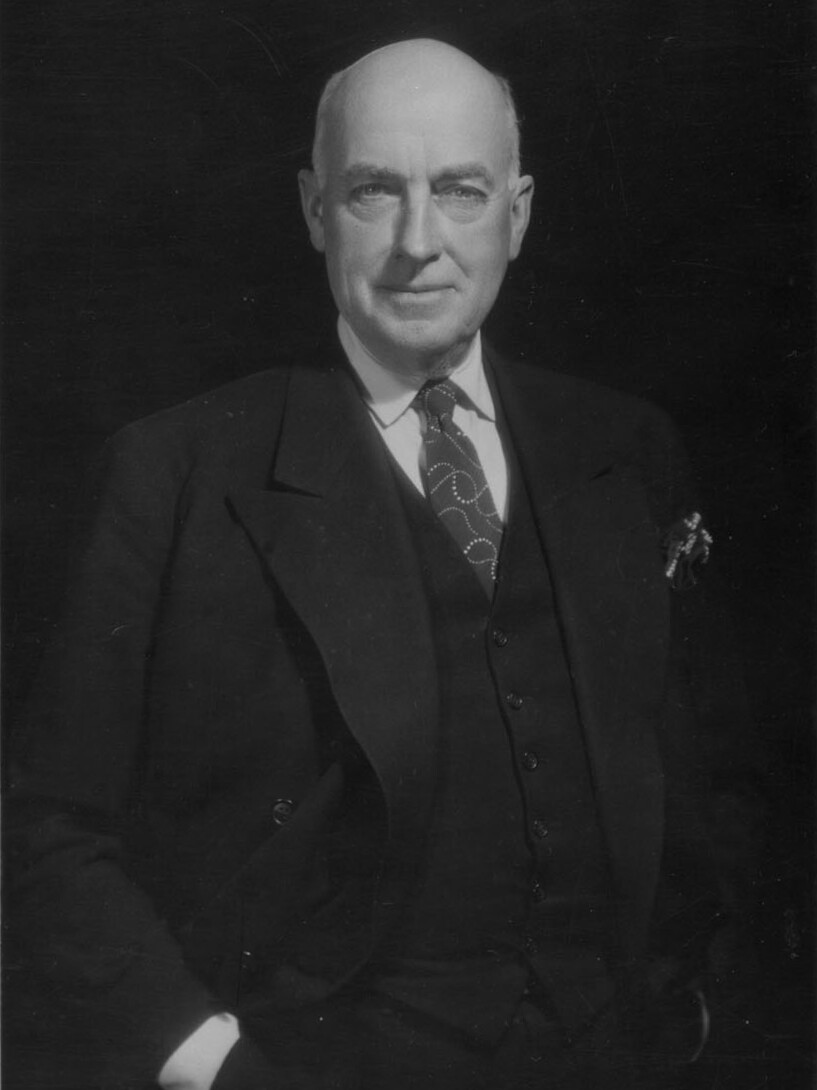

Member of Parliament for Vancouver North
- In office 1926–1930
- Preceded by: Dugald Donaghy
- Succeeded by: Albert Edward Munn

Canadian Senator from British Columbia
- In office 1931–1946

Personal details
- Born: November 17, 1874 Glencoe, Ontario, Canada
- Died: June 26, 1946 (aged 71) Ottawa, Ontario, Canada
- Party: Conservative
- Spouse(s): Blaunche Howe; Louise Rhodes
- Children: 3
- Occupation: Businessman

Alexander Duncan McRae, CB (November 17, 1874 – June 26, 1946) was a successful businessman, a Major General in the Canadian Army in First World War, a Member of Parliament, a Canadian Senator and a farmer.

== Origins ==
Alexander Duncan McRae was born and raised on a farm in Ekfrid Township, Middlesex County, Ontario. His father was Duncan Alexander McRae and his mother was Mary (Mahwhinney) McRae. His cousin and longtime business partner, Andrew Davidson (b. May 18, 1853) came from the same area. The two of them each went on to study at a Business school in Chatham, Ontario.

== Early career ==
In search of opportunities, at age 18 he went to work for his cousins, the brothers Alexander and Andrew Davidson of Duluth, Minnesota. The Davidsons had started in Little Falls, Minnesota, working for a railway company and moved into banking. Andrew had become mayor and they were involved in the business of buying, marketing and financing railway land to homesteaders. Minnesota made Andrew an honorary colonel. Their banking business spread through the region. In 1892, at 18 Alexander McRae joined them in Duluth and learned under Andrew.

McRae's first business venture on his own account started when his father put up $1,500 and McRae became a partner with the Davidsons in a company that insured grain elevators. The Davidson-McRae company sold fire and liability insurance and surety bonds. By the 1890s they had invested in various businesses and McRae became vice president of First National Bank of Hibbing. By age 25 he had $50,000 of his own earnings accumulated. He invested in other businesses including a granite quarry.

He married Blaunche Latimer Howe, of Pennsylvania who was the daughter of wealthy a forest industry father. They married in Minneapolis on February 23, 1900. They would eventually have three daughters, Blanche, Lucile, and Margaret ("Peggy").

As McRae and the Davidsons saw Minnesota land go up in price and farmers moving west for more land, they realized the Canadian prairies were an opportunity. They formed the Saskatchewan Valley Land Company headquartered in Winnipeg.

== Land Speculation in Saskatchewan ==
Land in Saskatchewan between Regina and Saskatoon had been surveyed in 1882. Railway companies were compensated with land grants for the cost of railway construction. The railway companies rejected much of the land between Regina and Saskatoon as unfit for settlement and court proceedings began. McRae and the Davidsons thought otherwise. In 1902 they bought land surrendered by the Cree and Assiniboine people under Treaty 4, which the government had assigned to the Qu'Appelle, Long Lake and Saskatchewan Railway. Their first purchases were 870,000 acres (3,500 km^{2}) for $1.53 an acre and a further 250,000 acres of Treaty 4 land from the federal government for $1 per acre. They bought a further 100,000 acres (400 km^{2}) from the Saskatchewan Western Railway. They agreed to terms that required them to actively seek settlers for the land. They were also appointed land agents for the Great Northern Railway owned by Donald Mann and William Mackenzie in 1902. By the time they were done these and other purchases, their syndicate and the various companies it consisted of owned about 5 million acres (20,000 km^{2}) of land which they sold between $2.25 and $12 per acre netting about $9 million.

In the summer of 1902, Davidson and McRae organized two promotional train tours from Minneapolis through to Prince Albert. Each of these journeys saw eight Pullman cars plus dining and baggage cars traveling through hundreds of miles of unbroken and uninhabited prairie lands. The passengers were wealthy investors from the United States. The promotion was a success. Large tracts were purchased and word spread in the business communities leading to further investment. The company developed a network of land agents to sell land to settlers which advertised and maintained sales offices in many locations. In 1901 the population of the North West Territories (which then included Alberta, Saskatchewan and most of Manitoba) was 158,940. In five years it had grown to 443,175. Under their colonization scheme 50,000 people settled in Saskatchewan.

The purchases of railway reserves required approval of the government. Those approvals and the purchases from the government were negotiated secretly with the Minister of the Interior, Clifford Sifton. A raging controversy arose in the House of Commons but the opposition was unable to make much of it even though McRae and his colleagues made a staggering profit in the transactions because the land had stood empty for years (the railway companies didn't want it), the government had insisted on terms that required the settlement of these vacant lands and overall the effort succeeded in rapidly filling vast areas of vacant land with settlers at a time when there was concern about American expansion into the territory.

== Business career in British Columbia ==
When McRae arrived to live in Vancouver in 1907, he came intending to involve himself in business ventures as an active investor. Even before arriving to live on the west coast, he had invested in Canadian North Pacific Fisheries. In its first year, it made a half million dollars. In its second year the business failed. He moved on to invest in Wallace Fisheries and became its president.

He knew from his business ventures in the prairies that there was a shortage of lumber there for building. Working with his partner, Davidson, Senator Peter Jansen of Nebraska, the Swift Brothers (meat packing), William Mackenzie and Donald Mann, he took over a sawmill and a company town 3 miles (4.8 km) upstream from New Westminster at a place called Millside at Fraser Mills (now part of Coquitlam). Once he persuaded the government to dredge the Fraser River to permit reliable passage of oceangoing freighters to the mill, he reorganized it as Fraser River Mills (after 1910 known as the Canadian Western Lumber Company) with several large investors and a capitalization of $20 million. The plant and its yards covered 80 acres (320,000 m^{2}) and took 1,030 men to run. With an investment of $500,000 in new equipment and the acquisition or formation of related companies such as The Canadian Tugboat Company and the Comox Logging and Railway to transport timber from the 75,000 acres (300 km^{2}) of timber the company controlled between Comox and Campbell River on Vancouver Island, the company became the largest lumber and wood manufacturing company in the world. The normal capacity of the mill was 750,000 board feet (1,800 m^{3}) of lumber a day. In 1912 the mill produced 175,000,000 board feet (410,000 m^{3}) of lumber, enough to fill 42 rail cars a day. The mill ran around the clock. In the years after McRae's involvement, it eventually, in 1954, was acquired by Crown Zellerbach, and, with further acquisitions became Fletcher Challenge Canada Limited in 1987. By 1911 he had purchased canneries on Princess Royal Island, at Rivers Inlet and at Smith's Inlet. He introduced mechanized canning to the fish packing industry.

By 1914, when World War I began, McRae was also president of Anacortes Lumber and Box Company, vice-president of Columbia River Lumber Company Ltd of Golden BC which became a subsidiary of Canadian Western, vice-president of Canadian Collieries (Dunsmuir) Ltd. of Victoria BC and president of Wallace Fisheries.

== Military service ==
In 1912, as a recruit of Major General Sir Sam Hughes, McRae volunteered with the 6th Regiment "The Duke of Connaught's Own Rifles" as an honorary lieutenant colonel. When World War I broke out, McRae went to Europe where his first responsibility was the purchase of horses for the army. He reorganized the Remount Commission and was responsible for the purchase of 8,000 horses. He took over a department known for corruption and dysfunction and has been credited for turning it into a business like organization. Rumours led nevertheless to charges about the conduct of these acquisitions resulting in a royal commission under Quebec Chief Justice Sir Charles Peers Davidson. The commission cleared McRae of wrongdoing and commended him for his performance.

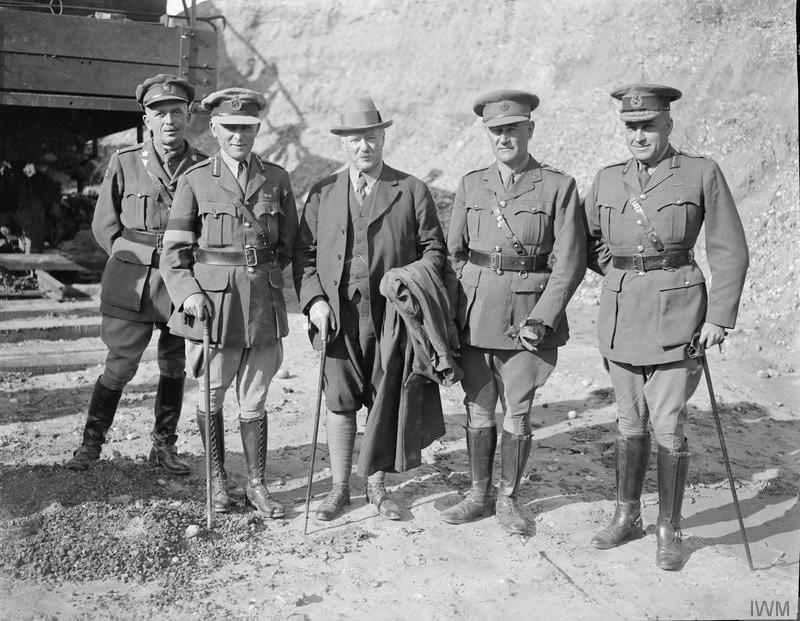
Canadian journalists with Major-General John William Stewart, GOC Canadian Railway Troops and Major-General Alexander McRae. Near Rang du Fliers, 21 July 1918.

He carried on as director of supplies and services and, when Hughes fell into disfavour in 1916, McRae continued to advance. He was promoted the rank of Major General and in 1917, was made a member of the Order of the Bath. Later in the war effort, he was seconded to the British Government to organize Ministry of Information assisting Britain's Minister of Information, Lord Beaverbrook. For his services, it has been said that the British crown offered McRae knighthood, which he declined, although McRae himself never confirmed or denied that this happened.

He left the army in 1918 two months after the end of the war. Afterwards he had little involvement in the military although, in 1934, addressing the Senate, he predicted correctly that another war would erupt in Europe after touring Europe and interviewing various prominent men in France, Germany and Austria. In World War II his involvement was limited to helping raise financial support for the Canadian Legion and the YMCA. In his later careers he was sometimes an advocate for returned veterans and in 1942 he donated his Vancouver mansion to the federal government for use as a hospital for wounded veterans.

== Hycroft ==
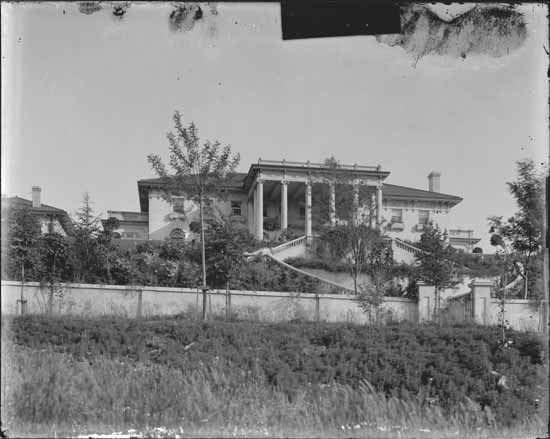
Hycroft Manor

After McRae settled in Vancouver in 1907 he proceeded to build a mansion for his family, to become known as Hycroft, in Shaughnessy one of Vancouver's neighborhoods. The home was built on the brow of a hill on 5.5 acres (22,000 m^{2}) of land. The land upon which the 30 room, 3 story mansion was built cost $10,000. The construction, completed in 1911, cost $100,000. The house was designed by Vancouver architect Thomas Hooper. After the death of his wife Blaunche in 1942, McRae donated Hycroft to the government of Canada to be used as a hospital for wounded veterans. Once converted, it housed 130 beds. Since 1962 Hycroft has been the home of the University Woman's Club of Vancouver and is home in that capacity to the club, founded in 1907 to promote education and human rights for women. The Club promotes education and opportunities for women and members enjoy sharing ideas, interests, and fun at its Clubhouse, Hycroft. Hycroft is available for member use, member events, and rentals. The French Olympic Team used the building during the 2010 Winter Olympic Games. It is also heavily used by Vancouver's film and television production industry as a set.

== Political career ==
=== British Columbia Provincial Party ===
In 1923 McRae organized a group of British Columbia Conservative Party dissidents he called the Committee of 100 which became the Provincial Party of British Columbia. The party sought freight rate equalization, cooperation with the federal government in the development of a northern railway, the elimination of Oriental labour, abolition of patronage, hiring of veterans and the elimination of income tax which had been introduced as a temporary measure during the war.

The party nominated candidates in only one provincial election: the 1924 election. In that election, McRae claimed the Liberal government of John Oliver and the previous administration of Conservative Premier William John Bowser, then the opposition leader, were corrupt. Many of his allegations were related to the funding of the Pacific Great Eastern Railway plan to reach Prince George in the Northern interior of the province which was not achieved until many years later. He claimed that there were kickbacks, patronage and various wrongdoings. His allegations were never proven. He offered to pay for an independent audit of the books of the railway. His offer was declined.

Although the party achieved 24% of the popular vote in the 1924 election and took 3 seats, McRae was not elected. Both Bowser and Oliver lost their seats but Oliver continued to lead his conservative party as Premier of a minority government after the election.

McRae reconciled with his former Conservative allies after the election and went on to federal politics. The Provincial Party disappeared.

=== Federal politics ===
McRae ran federally for the Conservatives winning a seat in Parliament the 1926 election representing the Vancouver North district. He organized the first modern leadership convention of the Conservative party in 1927. At the same time, he organized the bid of R.B. Bennett for the leadership. He went on to run Bennett's campaign in the 1930 election leading to his election as the 11th Prime Minister of Canada however McRae was defeated in his own constituency in that election. After a few months, Bennett appointed McRae to the Senate where he served until his death, at age 71 in 1946. He was active with his duties in the Senate until immediately before his last, brief, illness. He was interred at Ocean View Memorial Park in Burnaby, British Columbia.

== Post-war business career ==
During his Senate years, he became involved in various business ventures. He was involved in Texas-Canada Oil Company and Pioneer Gold Mine in BC. He was involved in mining in Alaska including the Yukon Charlie mine.

== Eaglecrest Lodge ==
In the early 1930s McRae purchased 260 acres (1.1 km^{2}) of ocean front bluff land in Qualicum Beach on Vancouver Island. In 1934 he built a country home, constructed of logs, 200 feet (60 m) long and 50 feet (15 m) wide. The property and its development were significant relief for the local population in the depressed economy of the 1930s. The home, which Princess (later Queen) Elizabeth and her husband stayed at for a private visit in 1951 during their honeymoon during subsequent ownership, burned to the ground in 1969. McRae also took up farming with the purchase of 2,000 acres (8 km^{2}) of land near Qualicum Beach. He employed about a hundred men in its operation for the 13 or 14 years that he owned it. He bred sheep and cattle.

== Sources ==
- Betty O'Keefe and Ian Macdonald (2001). Merchant Prince. Heritage House: Surrey, BC. ISBN 1-894384-30-X.
- Martin-McGuire, Peggy. "First Nation Land Surrenders on the Prairies 1896-1911" (PDF). Ch 2, Land and Colonization Companies, Indian Claims Commission. Archived from the original (PDF) on 2007-09-29.
