= Burrard (electoral district) =

Former federal electoral district in British Columbia, Canada

British Columbia electoral district
- Boundaries at abolition

Defunct federal electoral district
- Legislature: House of Commons
- District created: 1917
- District abolished: 1925
- First contested: 1917
- Last contested: 1921

Burrard was a federal electoral district in British Columbia, Canada, that was represented in the House of Commons of Canada from 1896 to 1904 and from 1917 to 1925. This riding was created in 1892 from parts of New Westminster riding. In 1903, this riding was redistributed into Vancouver City, Comox—Atlin and Yale—Cariboo, and was re-created from Vancouver City and Comox—Atlin in 1914. It was abolished in 1924 into Vancouver North and Vancouver—Burrard.

== Members of Parliament ==
Parliament	Years	Member	Party
Riding created from New Westminster
8th	1896–1900	George Ritchie Maxwell	Liberal
9th	1900–1902†	George Ritchie Maxwell	Liberal
9th	1903–1904	Robert George Macpherson	Liberal
Riding dissolved into Vancouver City, Comox—Atlin and Yale—Cariboo
Riding re-created from Vancouver City and Comox—Atlin
13th	1917–1921	Sanford Johnston Crowe	Government (Liberal–Unionist)
14th	1921–1925	John Arthur Clark	Conservative
Riding dissolved into Vancouver North and Vancouver—Burrard

== Election results ==
=== Burrard, 1917–1921 ===
1921 Canadian federal election
Party	Candidate	Votes	%	±%
Conservative	John Arthur Clark	12,240	55.89	–
Liberal	Malcolm Archibald Macdonald	6,960	31.78	+7.03
Independent	John David Harrington	2,699	12.33	–
Total valid votes		21,899	100.00	
Total rejected ballots		–		
Turnout		21,899	61.75	–35.10
Eligible voters		35,463		
Conservative gain from Government (Liberal–Unionist)		Swing		+24.43
Source: Library of Parliament

1917 Canadian federal election
Party	Candidate	Votes	%	±%
Government (Liberal–Unionist)	Sanford Johnston Crowe	12,566	66.08	–
Opposition (Laurier Liberals)	Patrick Donnelly	4,707	24.75	–
Labour	Victor Rainsford Midgley	1,744	9.17	–
Total valid votes		19,017	100.00	
Total rejected ballots		–		
Turnout		19,017	96.85	–
Eligible voters		19,636		
Government (Liberal–Unionist) notional gain from Liberal		Swing		–
This riding was created from Vancouver City and Comox—Atlin, both of which elected a Conservative in the previous election.
Source: Library of Parliament

=== Burrard, 1896–1904 ===
Canadian federal by-election, February 4, 1903 On the death of George Ritchie Maxwell, November 17, 1902
Party	Candidate	Votes	%	±%
Liberal	Robert George Macpherson	2,108	48.40	–8.12
Independent Liberal	Chris. Foley	1,885	43.28	–
Independent	Thomas Robert McInnes	362	8.31	–
Total valid votes		4,355	100.00	
Total rejected ballots		–		
Turnout		4,355	–	–
Eligible voters		–		
Liberal hold		Swing		–
Source: Library of Parliament

1900 Canadian federal election
Party	Candidate	Votes	%	±%
Liberal	George Ritchie Maxwell	2,716	56.52	+8.31
Conservative	James Garden	2,089	43.48	+4.77
Total valid votes		4,805	100.00	
Total rejected ballots		unknown		
Turnout		4,805	40.93	+10.45
Eligible voters		11,740		
Liberal hold		Swing		+1.77
Source: Library of Parliament

1896 Canadian federal election
Party	Candidate	Votes	%	±%
Liberal	George Ritchie Maxwell	1,512	48.21	–
Conservative	George Henry Cowan	1,214	38.71	–
Conservative	William John Bowser	410	13.07	–
Total valid votes		3,136	100.00	
Total rejected ballots		–		
Turnout		3,136	30.48	–
Eligible voters		10,290		
Liberal notional gain		Swing		–
This riding was created from New Westminster, which elected a Conservative in the previous election. Maxwell also nominated or endorsed by the Nationlist Party (a short lived labour party) and the McCarthyites
Source: Library of Parliament

== See also ==
- List of Canadian electoral districts
- Historical federal electoral districts of Canada
