= George Henry Cowan =

Canadian politician

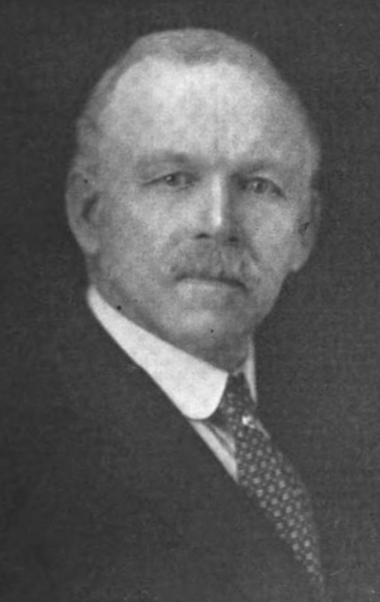

Member of the Canadian Parliament for Vancouver City
- In office 1908–1911
- Preceded by: Robert George Macpherson
- Succeeded by: Henry Herbert Stevens

Personal details
- Born: June 17, 1858 Watford, Canada West
- Died: September 20, 1935 (aged 77) Vancouver, British Columbia
- Party: Conservative

George Henry Cowan (June 17, 1858 – September 20, 1935) was a Canadian lawyer and Conservative politician. He represented Vancouver City in the House of Commons of Canada for one term from 1908 to 1911.

Born in Watford, Canada West, Cowan was educated at the University of Toronto and Osgoode Hall. He was called to the Ontario Bar in 1889 and moved to British Columbia in 1893. He was called to the British Columbia Bar in 1893 and practiced law in Vancouver. From 1907 to 1910, he was the city solicitor for Vancouver.

In 1894, he helped organize the first Conservative Association of Vancouver and served as its first secretary. He was elected to the Canadian House of Commons for Vancouver City in the 1908 election. He did not run for re-election.

He was the author of The Chinese Question in Canada and Better Terms for British Columbia.

He died at his home in Vancouver on September 20, 1935.

1896 Canadian federal election: Burrard
Party	Candidate	Votes	%	±%
Liberal	George Ritchie Maxwell	1,512	48.21	–
Conservative	George Henry Cowan	1,214	38.71	–
Conservative	William John Bowser	410	13.07	–
Total valid votes		3,136	100.00	
Total rejected ballots		–		
Turnout		3,136	30.48	–
Eligible voters		10,290		
Liberal notional gain		Swing		–
This riding was created from New Westminster, which elected a Conservative in the previous election. Maxwell also nominated or endorsed by the Nationlist Party (a short lived labour party) and the McCarthyites
Source: Library of Parliament
