= George Ritchie Maxwell =

Canadian politician

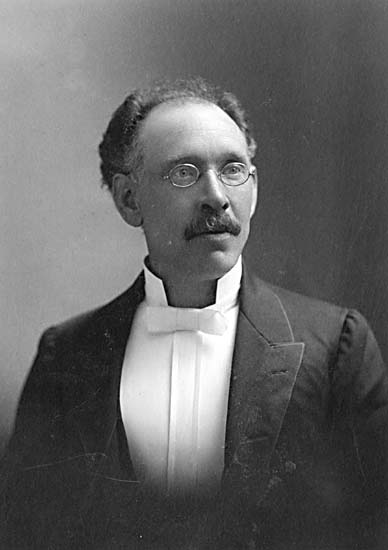

Member of the Canadian Parliament for Burrard
- In office 1896–1902
- Preceded by: Electoral district was created in 1902
- Succeeded by: Robert George Macpherson

Personal details
- Born: January 11, 1857 Stonehouse, South Lanarkshire, Scotland
- Died: November 17, 1902 (aged 45) Vancouver, British Columbia
- Party: Liberal

George Ritchie Maxwell (January 11, 1857 – November 17, 1902) was a Canadian Presbyterian minister and politician.

Born in Stonehouse, South Lanarkshire, Scotland, he was ordained a minister of the Church of Scotland in 1880. He migrated to Canada in 1885 serving as a minister in Quebec eventually setting in Vancouver, British Columbia in 1890.

In 1894, he founded the Nationalist Party, BC's first labour party. Considered the “guiding spirit” of the party, he campaigned under the party's banner during the 1896 federal election and also received the nomination by the Liberal Party when he contested the British Columbia electoral district of Burrard. Running as a Liberal, he was re-elected in 1900. As a parliamentarian he focused mainly on labour matters such as fair wages, the right of workers to unionize and freer trade. As was typical for supporters of labour movement at the time, Maxwell advocated for tougher restrictions on Asian immigration.

An enthusiastic supporter of Prime Minister Wilfrid Laurier while simultaneously an ally of controversial provincial leader "Fighting Joe" Martin (a former Premier before partisan system was instituted in the legislature), Maxwell was at the centre of Liberal Party internal rivalry drama in 1902. Despite having been in government from 1873 to 1878 and again since 1896, British Columbia Liberals had not have cabinet representation in either the earlier Mackenzie ministry or in the Laurier ministry up to that point. Clifford Sifton, Laurier's lieutenant for western Canada and a foe of Martin (from their time as Manitoba MLAs and successive Attorneys General), actively promoted Senator William Templeman, then chair of the party's BC provincial executive, and by early 1902 was being openly discussed in Ottawa as a presumptive minister. At the provincial Liberal convention held in February 1902 that elected Martin the party's first provincial leader, delegates formally voted against Templeman executive and installed Maxwell in his place. They also passed a resolution endorsing Maxwell as the province representative in the federal cabinet. While the maneuver delayed Templeman's appointment as BC's first Liberal federal minister by a few weeks, it was ultimately unsuccessful in securing Maxwell's place in Laurier's cabinet.

He died in office in 1902 from intestinal cancer at the age of 45.

1900 Canadian federal election: Burrard
Party	Candidate	Votes	%	±%
Liberal	George Ritchie Maxwell	2,716	56.52	+8.31
Conservative	James Garden	2,089	43.48	+4.77
Total valid votes		4,805	100.00	
Total rejected ballots		unknown		
Turnout		4,805	40.93	+10.45
Eligible voters		11,740		
Liberal hold		Swing		+1.77
Source: Library of Parliament

1896 Canadian federal election: Burrard
Party	Candidate	Votes	%	±%
Liberal	George Ritchie Maxwell	1,512	48.21	–
Conservative	George Henry Cowan	1,214	38.71	–
Conservative	William John Bowser	410	13.07	–
Total valid votes		3,136	100.00	
Total rejected ballots		–		
Turnout		3,136	30.48	–
Eligible voters		10,290		
Liberal notional gain		Swing		–
This riding was created from New Westminster, which elected a Conservative in the previous election. Maxwell also nominated or endorsed by the Nationlist Party (a short lived labour party) and the McCarthyites
Source: Library of Parliament
