= Dugald Donaghy =

Canadian politician (1873–1963)

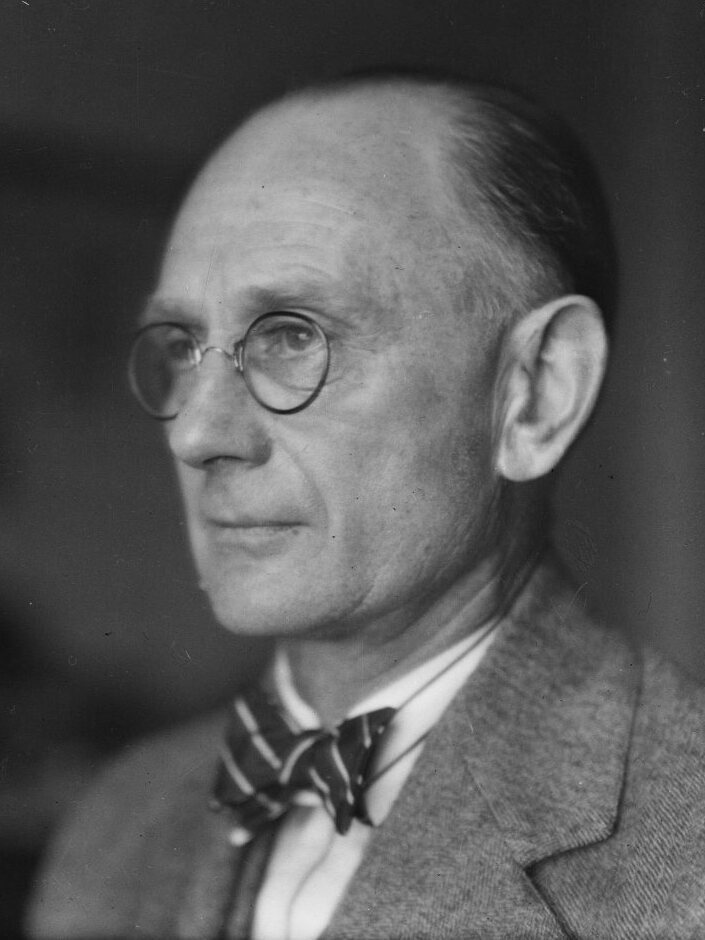
- Donaghy in 1927

Member of the Canadian Parliament for Vancouver North
- In office 1925–1926
- Preceded by: Riding established
- Succeeded by: Alexander Duncan McRae

Personal details
- Born: September 22, 1873 East Garafraxa, Ontario, Canada
- Died: October 17, 1963 (aged 90)
- Party: Liberal

Dugald Donaghy (September 22, 1873 – October 17, 1963) was a Canadian politician and lawyer.

Born in East Garafraxa, Ontario, Donaghby moved to British Columbia settling in North Vancouver where he practiced law.

He served as Mayor of North Vancouver from 1923 to 1925. He was elected to the House of Commons of Canada as the Liberal MP for Vancouver North in the 1925 federal election which resulted in a minority government but was defeated in the 1926 federal election when he ran in Vancouver Centre and was defeated by Henry Herbert Stevens.

He subsequently acted as city solicitor for North Vancouver and was also head of the Burrard Inlet Tunnel and Bridge Company.

In one case in the 1930s, as city solicitor, he prosecuted Joe Celona who had become the chief target of Vancouver's "war on crime". Celona was charged with procuring girls for prostitution and running a disorderly house.

Donaghy was particularly offended by the fact that Celona's brothel at the Maple Hotel was frequented by Chinese men. He told the court, "There are no words in the English language to describe the abhorrence of white prostitutes being procured exclusively for the yellow men from China," and was aghast "That these girls should be submitted to crawling yellow beasts of the type frequenting such dives."
