= E. T. Kingsley =

Founder and leader, Socialist Party of Canada

E.T. Kingsley
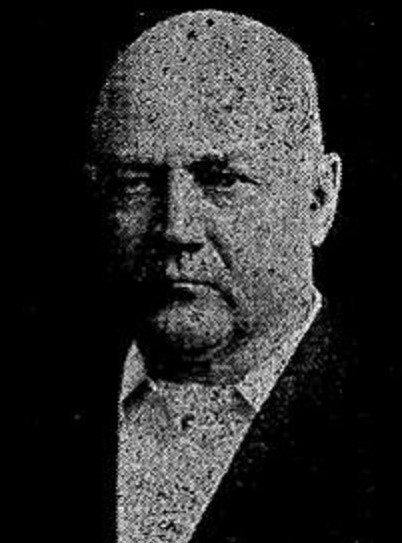
- Kingsley in 1916
- Born: 1856; Pomfret, Chautauqua County, New York, U.S.
- Died: December 9, 1929 (aged 72–73); Vancouver, British Columbia, Canada
- Occupations: Founder and leader, Socialist Party of Canada, publicist, organizer

Eugene Thornton Kingsley (1856 – December 9, 1929) was a founder and leader of the Socialist Party of Canada (SPC) and editor of Western Clarion, the SPC's official publication in early twentieth-century Canada.

== Early life ==
Little is known of Kingsley's early life. Born in 1856 in Pomfret, Chautauqua County, New York, Kingsley came from a modest, middle-class background. He spent his early years in the US, moving with his family from New York to Ohio, to Wisconsin, and finally to Minnesota, where he settled with his wife, Almyra "Myra" Doan, whom he had married in 1878 and with whom he had two sons. Kingsley himself kept moving west working on the railroad, eventually arriving in Montana as a brakeman for the Northern Pacific Railway.

== Industrial accident and radicalization ==
On October 15, 1890, Kingsley was setting brakes on the Northern Pacific line at Spring Gulch, located near Missoula, Montana. Due to a train car defect and the darkness of the night, he stepped through the gaps between the cars. The train ran over and crushed both of his legs, resulting in an eventual double amputation. While recovering in hospital, Kingsley read the works of Marx and Engels. After his convalescence, Kingsley divorced and moved to San Francisco, where he quickly became the state organizer for the Socialist Labor Party of America. He also ran twice for the US Congress under the SLP banner. However, he left the party after falling out with its leader, Daniel De Leon, over De Leon's shift toward syndicalism.

== Political life and work in British Columbia ==
In 1902, the Nanaimo Socialist Club invited Kingsley to speak on a tour of Vancouver Island. His impact was such that he was asked to stay. The club first sponsored Kingsley as a fishmonger, then as a printer. Kingsley's knowledge of socialist thought made him a valuable asset as an educator, organizer, speaker, and publicist for the emerging radical socialist movement in British Columbia. This was all the more remarkable as Canadian immigration law at the time largely prohibited immigrants with disabilities, and Kingsley wore prosthetic legs. However, the government made no move to deport him, although he was surveilled by the police.

The Nanaimo socialists left the Socialist Party of British Columbia and established the Revolutionary Socialist Party of Canada in 1902. The party's platform, which was the most militant in the country at the time, bears Kingsley's imprint. It declared that "the pathway leading to our emancipation from the chains of wage slavery is uncompromising political warfare against the capitalist class, with no quarter and no surrender." Kingsley then helped to arrange a merger of the two parties that included the platform's key elements.

Late in 1904, the Socialist Party of Canada was founded at a Socialist Party of British Columbia convention, with Kingsley emerging as the leading proponent of Impossiblism. Fundamental restructuring of society was necessary to redistribute wealth, according to this theory, with the workers rising to power through political organization, education and propaganda. Given this goal, Kingsley was dismissive of the revolutionary potential of trade unions as well as limited political reforms under capitalism.

Although the Socialist Party of Canada never held a national convention, Kingsley was considered to be the leader of the socialist movement until about 1912. He held executive positions, spoke widely, and served as editor of the SPC's flagship publication, Western Clarion, which he also helped to finance, from 1903 until 1908, and briefly in 1912. However, shortly after the outbreak of World War I, he penned an unsigned editorial in Western Clarion condemning German militarism and arguing that the allied powers were fighting a just war. This precipitated a break from the party, which had issued a manifesto opposing the war and upholding working-class internationalism. He did not write for the publication again.

Kingsley became active in the British Columbia Federated Labour Party, where he served as a vice-president and then as president. From 1915 to 1918, he contributed to and later edited the BCFL's Federationist newspaper. In 1919, he edited the weekly paper, Labour Star. During this period, he published his most substantive work, "The Genesis and Evolution of Slavery" (1916).

Throughout, Kingsley continued to seek elected office. He ran as a Socialist Party of Canada candidate for the British Columbia Legislative Assembly in the multiple-member Vancouver City riding in the 1907 and 1909 provincial elections as well as a 1909 by-election. He also ran for Parliament as an SPC candidate in the riding of Vancouver City in the 1908 and 1911 Canadian federal elections and as an independent labour candidate in the riding of Vancouver Centre in the 1926 Canadian federal election.
