= Unionist Party (Canada) =

Former Canadian political party (1917–1922)

Unionist Party French: Parti unioniste
- Canadian political party
- Leader: Robert Borden, Arthur Meighen
- Founded: October 10, 1917
- Dissolved: 1922
- Preceded by: Conservative Party; Liberal–Unionist
- Merged into: Conservative Party
- Headquarters: Ottawa, Ontario
- Ideology: British imperialism Conservatism; Liberalism
- Political position: Centre to centre-right

The Unionist Party was a centre to centre-right political party in Canada, composed primarily of Conservative party members of Parliament and some Liberal members of Parliament. It was formed in 1917 by MPs who supported the Union government formed by Sir Robert Borden during the First World War, who formed the government through the final years of the war, and was a proponent of conscription. It was opposed by the remaining Liberal MPs, who sat as the official opposition.

The Unionist Party continued to exist until 1922, at which time the Conservative elements re-formed the Conservative party.

== Formation ==
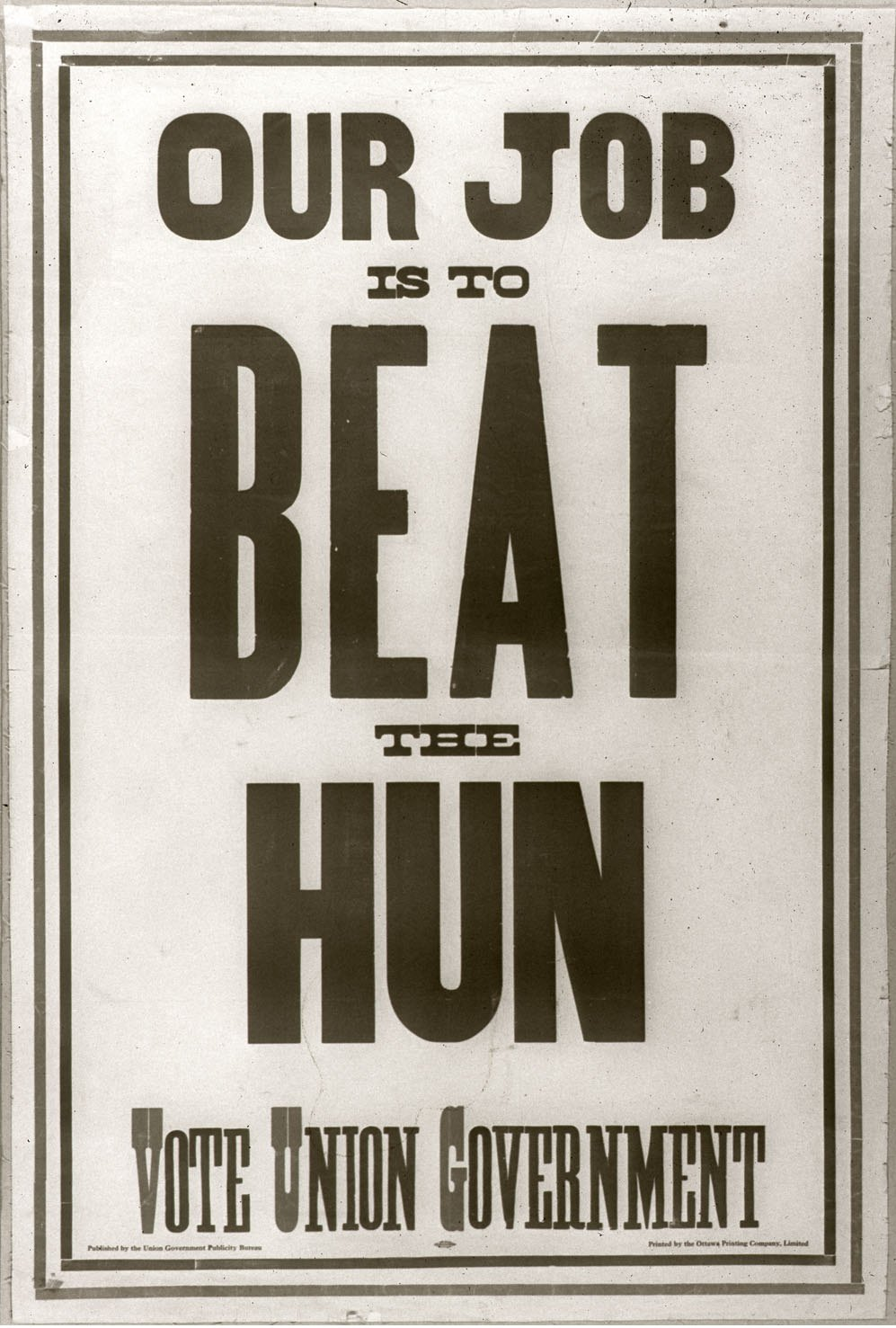
Poster for Borden's Union government.

In May 1917, Conservative Prime Minister Borden proposed the formation of a national unity government or coalition government to Liberal leader Sir Wilfrid Laurier in order to enact conscription and to govern for the remainder of the war. Laurier rejected this proposal because of the opposition of his Quebec MPs and fears that Quebec nationalist leader Henri Bourassa would be able to exploit the situation. Public opinion in Quebec was heavily against conscription, influencing the Liberal opposition to it due to the large number of Liberal MPs from Quebec.

As an alternative to a coalition with Laurier, on October 12, 1917, Borden formed the Union government with a Cabinet of twelve Conservatives, nine Liberals and Independents, and one Labour member. To represent labour and the working class, Borden appointed to the Cabinet Conservative Senator Gideon Decker Robertson who had been appointed to the Senate in January and had links with the conservative wing of the labour movement through his profession as a telegrapher. Robertson, however, was a Tory and not a member of any Labour or socialist party.

Borden then called an election for December 1917 on the issue of conscription (see also Conscription Crisis of 1917), running as head of the Unionist Party composed of Borden's Conservatives, independent MPs, and members of the Liberals who left Laurier's caucus to support conscription.

Supporters of the Borden government ran for parliament as Unionists, while some of the Liberals running as government supporters preferred to call themselves Liberal-Unionist. Prime Minister Borden pledged himself during the 1917 campaign to equal suffrage for women. He introduced a bill in 1918 for extending the franchise to women; it passed without division.

This tactic split the Liberal Party: those who did not join the Unionist Party ran as Laurier Liberals. The election resulted in a landslide election victory for Borden.

Borden attempted to continue the Unionist Party after the war and when Arthur Meighen succeeded him in 1920, he renamed it the National Liberal and Conservative Party in the hope of making the coalition permanent. The Unionists had never been officially a single party, and therefore lacked the structure of an official party and Meighen hoped to change this.

In the 1921 general election, most of the Liberal-Unionist MPs did not join this party and ran as Liberals under the leadership of its new leader, William Lyon Mackenzie King. Only a handful ran again as Liberal-Unionists or joined Meighen's renamed party. Prominent Liberal-Unionists who stayed with the Conservatives include Hugh Guthrie and Robert Manion.

Following the defeat of Meighen's government, the National Liberal and Conservative Party changed its name to the Liberal-Conservative Party of Canada, although it was commonly known as the Conservative Party.

During World War II, the Conservatives opposed the Liberal government of William Lyon Mackenzie King in the 1940 election by campaigning for a national government along the lines of the previous war's Unionist government. Accordingly, Conservatives ran as National Government candidates. However, King's Liberals won a landslide victory and continued to rule as an ordinary majority government throughout the war.

== Election results ==
Election	Leader	Candidates	Votes	Vote %	Seats won	+/–	Pos.	Status
1917	Robert Borden	211	1,070,694	56.93%	152 / 235 (65%)	▲20	1st	Majority

== See also ==
- Conservative Party of Canada (1867–1942)
- Laurier Liberals
- List of political parties in Canada
- Lloyd George ministry, contemporary UK government supported by most Conservative and Liberal MPs except the Independent Liberals
