= Liberal–Unionists =

Faction of the Unionist Party of Canada

- Leader: Robert Borden (Note: Robert Borden was not a member of the Liberal–Unionist faction, but was the de facto leader of the group due to his leadership of the Unionist Party)
- Founded: October 12, 1917
- Dissolved: c. 1921
- Split from: Liberal Party
- Merged into: Liberal Party (majority); Conservative Party (partially)
- Faction within: Unionist Party
- Ideology: British imperialism Liberalism

Liberal–Unionists were members of the Liberal Party of Canada who, as a result of the Conscription Crisis of 1917 rejected Sir Wilfrid Laurier's leadership and supported Robert Borden's Unionist caucus from 1917 to 1920.

Much of the Ontario Liberal Party declared themselves to be Liberal–Unionists, including provincial party leader Newton Rowell, who joined Borden's Cabinet, and a variety of Liberal MPs.

Following the dissolution of the 12th Canadian Parliament but before the 1917 federal election, Borden appointed a new cabinet, which included 1 former Liberal MP and 1 Ontario Liberal member of Provincial Parliament. In the 1917 election, many Liberals ran as Liberal–Unionists or Unionists against the Laurier Liberals.

After the war, most Liberal–Unionists rejoined the Liberal Party despite efforts by Borden and Arthur Meighen to make the coalition permanent by renaming the Conservative party the National Liberal and Conservative Party. Several Liberal–Unionists ended up staying with the Conservatives including Hugh Guthrie and Robert Manion.

== Notable Liberal–Unionists ==
Liberal–Unionists elected in 1917 federal election
Member	Riding	Notes
Frank Broadstreet Carvell	Victoria—Carleton	Minister of Public Works (October 13, 1917 – August 6, 1919)
William Andrew Charlton	Norfolk	
Sanford Johnston Crowe	Burrard	
Charles Edwin Long	North Battleford	
John Flaws Reid	Mackenzie	

Liberals in Borden's cabinet
Member	Portfolio	Term	Notes
Frank Broadstreet Carvell	Minister of Public Works	October 13, 1917 – August 6, 1919	
Newton Rowell	Minister presiding over the Department of Health	June 6, 1919 – July 10, 1920	Ontario Liberal MPP (1911–1918)
Newton Rowell	President of the Privy Council	October 12, 1917 – July 10, 1920	Ontario Liberal MPP (1911–1918)

== See also ==
- List of political parties in Canada
- History of the Liberal Party of Canada
- 12th Canadian Parliament
- 13th Canadian Parliament

== Sources ==
- Rose, John Holland; Newton, Arthur Percival; Benians, Ernest Alfred (1930). Canada and Newfoundland. Cambridge University Press. pp. 757–758.
