= Vancouver North =

Former federal electoral district in British Columbia, Canada

British Columbia electoral district

Defunct federal electoral district
- Legislature: House of Commons
- District created: 1924
- District abolished: 1947
- First contested: 1925
- Last contested: 1945

Vancouver North was a federal electoral district in British Columbia, Canada, that was represented in the House of Commons of Canada from 1925 to 1949.

This riding was created in 1924 from parts of Burrard and Comox—Alberni ridings.

A redistribution in 1933 rearranged the riding's boundaries. The Sunshine Coast and other areas west of it were added to Comox-Alberni, and portions of the Fraser Valley north of the Fraser River were added to Vancouver North. Burnaby north of the BCER line was also in the riding, which excluded the City of New Westminster, which had its own riding.

It was abolished in 1947 when it was redistributed into Burnaby—Richmond and Coast—Capilano ridings.

== Members of Parliament ==
Parliament	Years	Member	Party
Riding created from Burrard and Comox—Alberni
15th	1925–1926	Dugald Donaghy	Liberal
16th	1926–1930	Alexander Duncan McRae	Conservative
17th	1930–1935	Albert Edward Munn	Liberal
18th	1935–1940	Charles Grant MacNeil	Co-operative Commonwealth
19th	1940–1945	James Sinclair	Liberal
20th	1945–1949	James Sinclair	Liberal
Riding dissolved into Burnaby—Richmond and Coast—Capilano

== Election results ==
1945 Canadian federal election
Party	Candidate	Votes	%	±%
Liberal	James Sinclair	13,373	38.60	+0.45
Co-operative Commonwealth	Colin S. Johnston	10,010	28.89	–6.84
Progressive Conservative	George Nuttall	5,971	17.23	–8.88
Labor–Progressive	Austin Delany	3,809	10.99	–
Social Credit	Weldon F. Mulligan	1,483	4.28	–
Total valid votes		34,646	99.10	
Total rejected ballots		315	0.90	–0.50
Turnout		34,961	75.52	–1.41
Eligible voters		46,294		
Liberal hold		Swing		+3.64
Source: Library of Parliament

1940 Canadian federal election
Party	Candidate	Votes	%	±%
Liberal	James Sinclair	10,496	38.15	+2.52
Co-operative Commonwealth	Charles Grant MacNeil	9,832	35.73	–4.22
National Government	Reginald Hibbert Tupper	7,186	26.12	+12.13
Total valid votes		27,514	98.60	
Total rejected ballots		392	1.40	+0.59
Turnout		27,906	76.93	–0.60
Eligible voters		36,275		
Liberal gain from Co-operative Commonwealth		Swing		+3.38
Source: Library of Parliament

1935 Canadian federal election
Party	Candidate	Votes	%	±%
Co-operative Commonwealth	Charles Grant MacNeil	8,641	39.96	–
Liberal	Albert Edward Munn	7,705	35.63	–18.52
Conservative	William Henry Woods	3,025	13.99	–31.86
Reconstruction	William Savage	2,255	10.43	–
Total valid votes		21,626	99.18	
Total rejected ballots		178	0.82	+0.82
Turnout		21,804	77.53	+2.51
Eligible voters		28,122		
Co-operative Commonwealth gain from Liberal		Swing		+29.24
Source: Library of Parliament

1930 Canadian federal election
Party	Candidate	Votes	%	±%
Liberal	Albert Edward Munn	6,799	54.15	+13.72
Conservative	Alexander Duncan McRae	5,757	45.85	–0.95
Total valid votes		12,556	100.00	
Total rejected ballots		–		
Turnout		12,556	75.02	–0.08
Eligible voters		16,737		
Liberal gain from Conservative		Swing		+7.34
Source: Library of Parliament

1926 Canadian federal election
Party	Candidate	Votes	%	±%
Conservative	Alexander Duncan McRae	5,080	46.80	+7.32
Liberal	Gerry McGeer	4,388	40.43	–5.30
Labour	Wallis Walter LeFeaux	1,363	12.56	–2.23
Independent	James Cavers Gill	23	0.21	–
Total valid votes		10,854	100.00	
Total rejected ballots		–		
Turnout		10,854	75.10	+2.83
Eligible voters		14,452		
Conservative gain from Liberal		Swing		+6.31
Source: Library of Parliament

1925 Canadian federal election
Party	Candidate	Votes	%	±%
Liberal	Dugald Donaghy	4,279	45.73	–
Conservative	George Herbert Morden	3,694	39.48	–
Labour	William Jamison Curry	1,384	14.79	–
Total valid votes		9,357	100.00	
Total rejected ballots		–		
Turnout		9,357	72.27	–
Eligible voters		12,947		
This riding was created from parts of Burrard and Comox—Alberni, which elected a Conservative and a Progressive member, respectively, in the last election.
Source: Library of Parliament

== See also ==
- List of Canadian electoral districts
- Historical federal electoral districts of Canada
