= Comox—Atlin =

Former federal electoral district in British Columbia, Canada

British Columbia electoral district

Defunct federal electoral district
- Legislature: House of Commons
- District created: 1904
- District abolished: 1917
- First contested: 1904
- Last contested: 1911

Comox—Atlin was a federal electoral district in the province of British Columbia, Canada, that was represented in the House of Commons of Canada from 1904 to 1917.

This riding was created in 1903 from parts of Burrard and Vancouver ridings. The electoral district was abolished in 1914 when it was redistributed into Comox—Alberni and Skeena ridings.

== Members of Parliament ==
Parliament	Years	Member	Party
Riding created from Burrard and Vancouver
10th	1904–1908	William Sloan	Liberal
11th	1908–1909	William Sloan	Liberal
11th	1909–1911	William Templeman	Liberal
12th	1911–1917	Herbert Sylvester Clements	Conservative
Riding dissolved into Comox—Alberni and Skeena

== Election results ==
1911 Canadian federal election
Party	Candidate	Votes	%	±%
Conservative	Herbert Sylvester Clements	1,810	52.74	–
Liberal	Duncan Ross	1,622	47.26	–
Total valid votes		3,432	100.00	
Total rejected ballots		–		
Turnout		3,432	34.61	–
Eligible voters		9,917		
Conservative gain from Liberal		Swing		–
Source: Library of Parliament

Canadian federal by-election, 8 February 1909 On William Sloan's resignation, 21 January 1909
Party	Candidate	Votes
Liberal	William Templeman	acclaimed

1908 Canadian federal election
Party	Candidate	Votes
Liberal	William Sloan	acclaimed

1904 Canadian federal election
Party	Candidate	Votes
Liberal	William Sloan	acclaimed

== See also ==
- List of Canadian electoral districts
- Historical federal electoral districts of Canada
