= Charles Grant MacNeil =

Canadian politician (1892–1976)

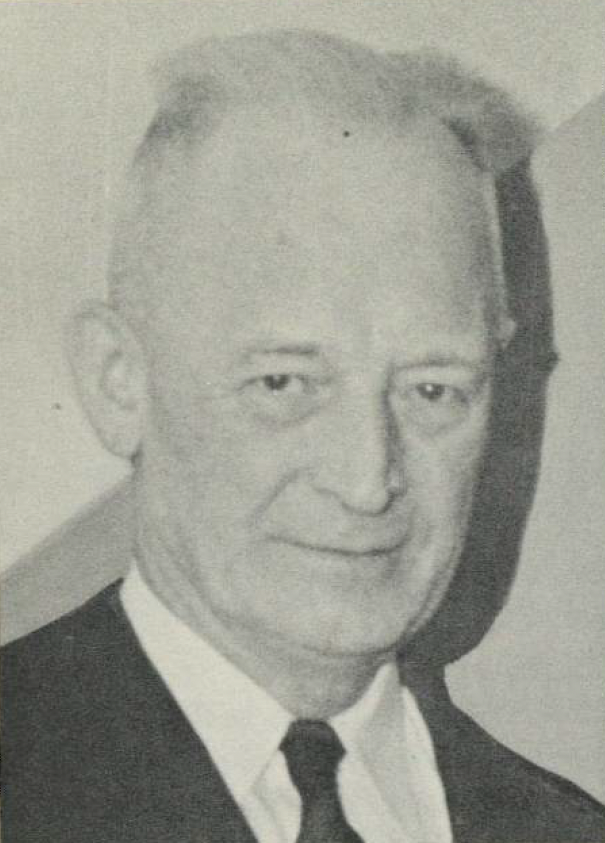

Charles Grant MacNeil (12 December 1892 – 31 March 1976) (known as Grant MacNeil) was a Canadian politician. A member of the Co-operative Commonwealth Federation (CCF), he was the member of Parliament for Vancouver North from 1935 to 1940, and the British Columbia member of the legislature for Vancouver-Burrard from 1941 to 1945.

A salesman by profession, MacNeill was elected to the House of Commons as the MP for Vancouver North in the 1935 federal election. He was defeated in the 1940 federal election and moved to provincial politics, where he unsuccessfully contested the 1940 by-election in Mackenzie. He stood again in the 1941 British Columbia general election for Vancouver-Burrard, and was elected. He was defeated for re-election in the 1945 election, and failed to return to the Legislature in the 1949, 1952, and 1953 provincial elections. MacNeil served as president of the British Columbia section of the party in the 1950s. He was also active with the International Woodworkers of America in British Columbia, working as editor of the IWA's Lumber Worker newspaper into the 1970s.

MacNeil was appointed Executive Secretary of the British Columbia Security Council board and only accepted the position in an attempt to ensure the fair treatment for Japanese Canadians being uprooted from their homes on the West Coast after the Pearl Harbor attack during World War II.
