= Laurier Liberals =

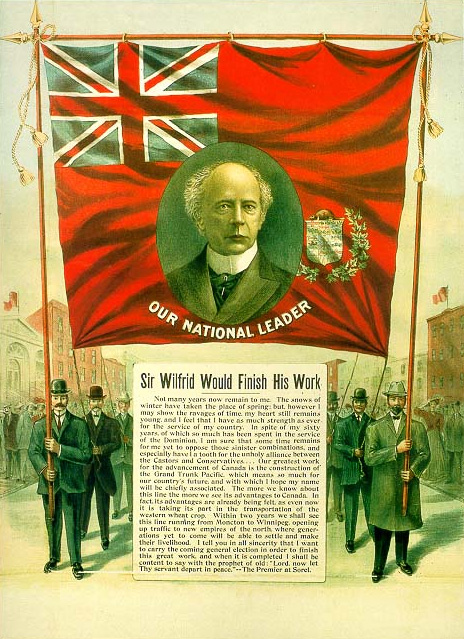
- Leader: Wilfrid Laurier
- Founder: Wilfrid Laurier
- Founded: 1917
- Dissolved: 1921
- Preceded by: Liberal Party of Canada
- Merged into: Liberal Party of Canada

Prior to the 1917 federal election in Canada, the Liberal Party of Canada split into two factions. To differentiate the groups, historians tend to use two retrospective names:

- The Laurier Liberals, who opposed conscription of soldiers to support Canada's involvement in World War I and who were led by former Prime Minister Sir Wilfrid Laurier; and
- The Liberal Unionists who joined Sir Robert Borden's Unionist government.

== History ==
Seeking broader support for the imposition of conscription in 1917, Borden invited the Liberals into a wartime coalition government with the Conservatives. Sir Wilfrid Laurier, an opponent of conscription who feared for the nation if an opposition was not represented in Parliament, refused the request.

Despite Laurier's refusal, the request split the Liberal Party largely along linguistic lines. Many provincial Liberal parties in English-speaking Canada and a number of Liberal Members of Parliament supported conscription and decided to support Borden's "Unionist" government.

Quebec Liberals, along with a minority of English candidates (such as William Lyon Mackenzie King) refused to join Borden and continued in the party under Laurier's leadership. The candidates ran as Liberals, and on military ballots, were labelled as "Opposition."

Of the 235 seats in the House of Commons of Canada, only 82 returned Laurier Liberals in the election held December 17, 1917:

- 62 were elected in Quebec ridings,
- 1 from Alberta,
- 1 was from a Manitoba riding with a large francophone population,
- 4 were from New Brunswick,
- 4 were from Nova Scotia,
- 2 were from Prince Edward Island, and
- 8 were from Ontario.

With only 20 seats outside Quebec, the Liberal Party was reduced to a largely French-Canadian parliamentary rump in 1917.

The Conservatives attempted to make their alliance with Liberal Unionists permanent through the formation of the National Liberal and Conservative Party. However, under a new leader, William Lyon Mackenzie King, the Liberals were able to recover enough of their support in English Canada to form a minority government following the 1921 federal election.

== See also ==
- List of Canadian political parties
