= Ralph Campney =

Canadian politician (1894-1967)

The Honourable Ralph Campney PC QC
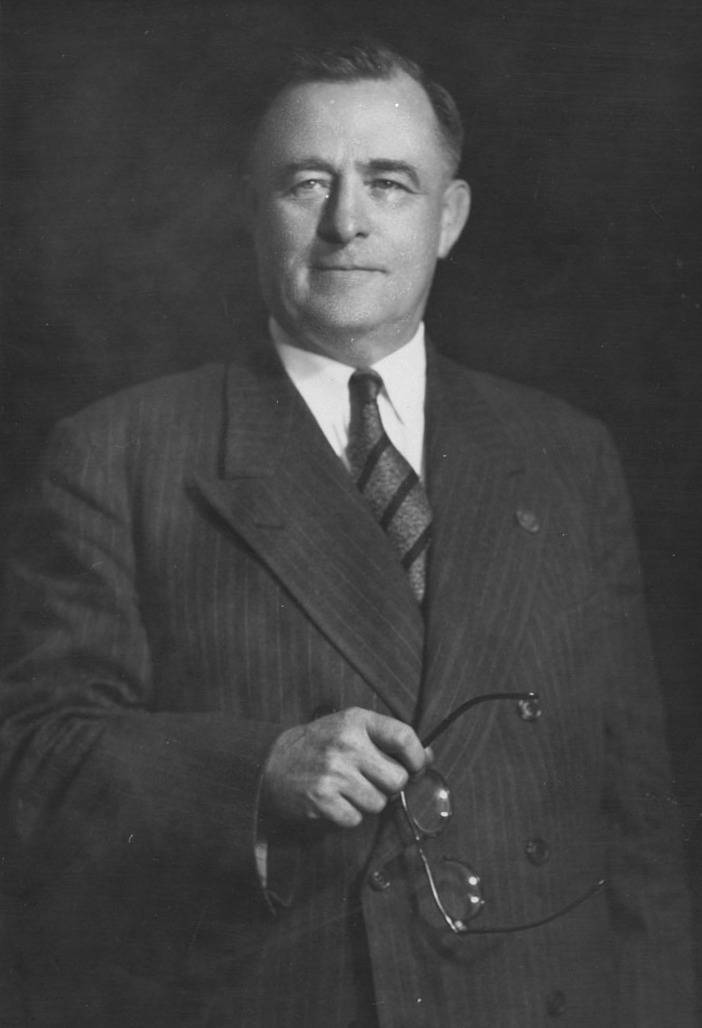
- Campney, c. 1940s

Minister of National Defence
- In office July 1, 1954 – June 20, 1957
- Prime Minister: Louis St. Laurent
- Preceded by: Douglas Abbott
- Succeeded by: George Pearkes

Solicitor General of Canada
- In office October 15, 1952 – January 11, 1954
- Preceded by: Stuart Sinclair Garson
- Succeeded by: William Ross Macdonald

Member of Parliament for Vancouver Centre
- In office June 27, 1949 – June 9, 1957
- Preceded by: Rodney Young
- Succeeded by: Douglas Jung

Personal details
- Born: June 6, 1894 Picton, Ontario, Canada
- Died: October 6, 1967 (aged 73)
- Party: Liberal

Military service
- Allegiance: Canada; United Kingdom
- Branch/service: Canadian Expeditionary Force, Royal Flying Corps
- Years of service: 1914-1918
- Rank: Lieutenant
- Battles/wars: World War I

Ralph Osborne Campney PC QC (June 6, 1894 – October 6, 1967) was a Canadian politician.

Born in Picton, Ontario, he first ran unsuccessfully for the House of Commons of Canada in the riding of Vancouver Centre in a 1948 by-election. A Liberal, he was elected in the 1949 federal election and in 1953. He was defeated in 1957. From 1951 to 1952, he was the Parliamentary Assistant to the Minister of National Defence. From 1952 to 1954, he was the Solicitor General of Canada. From 1953 to 1954, he was also the Associate Minister of National Defence. From 1954 to 1957, he was the Minister of National Defence.

== Early life and military service ==
Campney was born on June 6, 1894, on a farm near Picton, Ontario, to Frank Campney and Mary Emily Cronk. Campney attended Picton Collegiate and graduated at 16, beginning a career as a rural school teacher. In 1914, Campney entered Queen's University at Kingston, Ontario, studying medicine.

In March 1915, Campney enlisted in the Canadian Army with No.5 Stationary Hospital (Queen's). During World War I he was deployed overseas to Egypt as part of the Dardanelles Campaign. The unit was later transferred to the Western Front where it supported Allied forces at the Battle of the Somme. In 1917, Campney was commissioned into the infantry, joining the 19th Canadian Infantry Battalion after the Battle of Vimy Ridge. He served with the unit until the Battle of Passchendaele when he was invalided to England. In England, Campney transferred to the Royal Flying Corps and remained with the unit until the Armistice.

== Postwar and political career ==
After leaving the military, Campney returned to Queen's University in 1919 where he transferred from medicine to arts and obtained his Bachelor of Arts in 1921. Campney entered Osgoode Hall to study law and in 1924, was called to the bar. He was secretary to the Canadian delegation to the League of Nations in Geneva, Switzerland in Fall 1924. Upon his return to Canada, Campney became political secretary to William Lyon Mackenzie King from 1925 to 1926 in Ottawa. In 1929, Campney became private secretary to the Minister of Trade and Commerce James Malcolm.

Campney left Ottawa in 1929 and moved to Vancouver, British Columbia, to practice law. 1936, Campney was asked by the Canadian government to become the first chairman of the National Harbours Board, remaining in this position for three and a half years. He resigned from the position and returned to his private law practice. In 1940, Campney was appointed Dominion King's Counsel. He ran for the first time as a Liberal nominee in a federal by-election in the riding of Vancouver Centre in 1948, where he was defeated. He ran again the following year in the general election, where he was elected to the House of Commons and was re-elected in 1953. In 1950, Crampney was chair of a special parliamentary committee on the National Defence Act which unified the administration of the three military services. In January 1951, he was appointed Parliamentary Assistant to the Minister of Defence, Brooke Claxton. The following year, on October 15, 1952, he was made Solicitor General of Canada. On February 15, 1953, he was appointed Associate Minister of National Defence while keeping his duties as Solicitor General and kept these two positions until January 12, 1954, when he resigned as Solicitor General. On July 1, he succeeded Claxton as Minister of National Defence.

== Election results ==
1957 Canadian federal election
Party	Candidate	Votes	%	±%
Progressive Conservative	Douglas Jung	9,087	41.50	+32.86
Liberal	Ralph Campney	5,357	24.47	-16.37
Social Credit	Cyril White	4,707	21.50	-2.96
Co-operative Commonwealth	William James Dennison	2,216	10.12	-12.21
Labor–Progressive	Maurice Rush	528	2.41	-1.33
Total valid votes		21,895	100.0	
Progressive Conservative gain from Liberal		Swing		+24.62

1953 Canadian federal election
Party	Candidate	Votes	%	±%
Liberal	Ralph Campney	8,259	40.83	-1.73
Social Credit	Leslie R. Peterson	4,946	24.45	–
Co-operative Commonwealth	Rodney Young	4,516	22.33	-4.05
Progressive Conservative	Wendell Willard Wright	1,749	8.65	-16.02
Labor–Progressive	Ernest Lawrie	756	3.74	-0.20
Total valid votes		20,226	100.0	
Liberal hold		Swing		-13.09

1949 Canadian federal election
Party	Candidate	Votes	%	±%
Liberal	Ralph Campney	10,299	42.56	+8.90
Co-operative Commonwealth	Rodney Young	6,382	26.37	-17.22
Progressive Conservative	Henry Herbert Stevens	5,970	24.67	+1.93
Labor–Progressive	Maurice Rush	952	3.93	–
Independent	Harold Meade Young	595	2.46	–
Total valid votes		24,198	100.0	
Liberal gain from Co-operative Commonwealth		Swing		+13.06

Canadian federal by-election, 8 June 1948 On Ian Mackenzie being called to the Senate, 19 January 1948
Party	Candidate	Votes	%	±%
Co-operative Commonwealth	Rodney Young	9,518	43.60	+16.27
Liberal	Ralph Campney	7,348	33.66	+3.90
Progressive Conservative	Hilliard Lyle Jestley	4,965	22.74	-3.73
Total valid votes		21,831	100.0	
Co-operative Commonwealth gain from Liberal		Swing		+6.18
