= Hedy Fry =

Canadian politician (born 1941)

The Honourable Hedy Fry PC MP
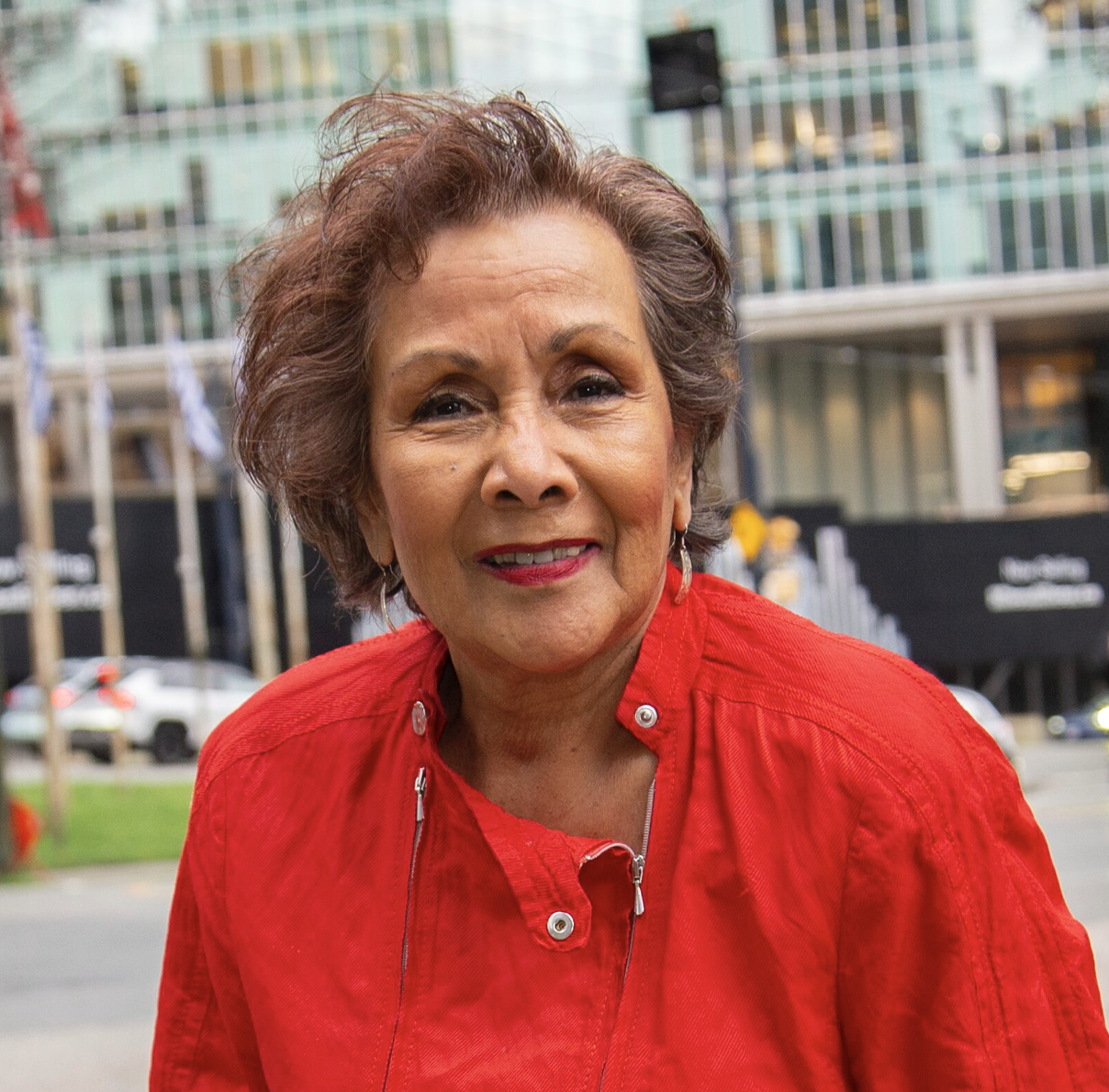
- Fry in 2025

Member of Parliament for Vancouver Centre
- Incumbent
- Assumed office October 25, 1993
- Preceded by: Kim Campbell

Chairwoman of the Standing Committee on Canadian Heritage
- In office February 4, 2016 – February 5, 2018
- Minister: Mélanie Joly
- Preceded by: Gord Brown
- Succeeded by: Julie Dabrusin

Chairwoman of the Standing Committee on Status of Women
- In office 5 February 2009 – 20 June 2011
- Minister: Rona Ambrose
- Preceded by: Yasmin Ratansi
- Succeeded by: Niki Ashton

Secretary of State (Multiculturalism) (Status of Women)
- In office 25 January 1996 – 27 January 2002
- Prime Minister: Jean Chretien
- Preceded by: Sheila Finestone
- Succeeded by: Claudette Bradshaw

Personal details
- Born: August 6, 1941 (age 85) San Fernando, Trinidad and Tobago
- Party: Liberal
- Children: 3, including Pete Fry
- Profession: Physician
- Website: hedyfry.com

Hedy Madeleine Fry (born August 6, 1941) is a Canadian politician and physician who has been the member of Parliament (MP) for Vancouver Centre since 1993. A member of the Liberal Party, Fry is the longest-serving female MP, having won eleven consecutive elections since 1993, when she defeated then Prime Minister Kim Campbell.

== Early life and career ==
Fry was born in San Fernando, Trinidad and Tobago. She is of Scottish, Spanish, Indian, and Chinese ancestry. After declining an English Literature scholarship to the University of Oxford, Fry earned her equivalent of a bachelor of science in one year and then went on to receive her medical training at the Royal College of Surgeons in Dublin, Ireland. She immigrated to Canada in 1970 and established a practice in Vancouver.

Fry worked at St. Paul's Hospital in Vancouver for 23 years. She served as president of the British Columbia (BC) Federation of Medical Women in 1977, the Vancouver Medical Association from 1988 to 1989, and the BC Medical Association from 1990 to 1991. In addition, she chaired the Canadian Medical Association's Multiculturalism Committee from 1992 to 1999. She volunteered as a Tawny Owl as a member of the Girl Guides of Canada, leading a Brownie group. Fry was also a host on the nationally televised CBC show Doctor Doctor.

== Political career ==
Fry sought the Liberal Party nomination for Vancouver Centre in the lead-up to the 1993 federal election, defeating lawyer David Varty and college lecturer John Lang. She was elected to the House of Commons of Canada, defeating Progressive Conservative Prime Minister Kim Campbell. Fry was the fifth person to unseat a sitting prime minister, and the first to do so in their first run for office. Fry has been re-elected in every subsequent election (1997, 2000, 2004, 2006, 2008, 2011, 2015, 2019, 2021 and 2025).

=== Chretien and Martin governments ===
She served as Parliamentary Secretary to the Minister of National Health and Welfare from 1993 until 1996 when she was appointed to the Cabinet as Secretary of State for Multiculturalism and Status of Women.

In 2002, Fry apologized to the people of Prince George, British Columbia after she said in the House of Commons that “crosses are being burned on lawns as we speak”. Fry did not remain a minister after cabinet was shuffled in 2002.

When Paul Martin became Prime Minister of Canada at the end of 2003, she was appointed Parliamentary Secretary to the Minister of Citizenship and Immigration with special emphasis on Foreign Credentials. After the 2004 election, she was named Parliamentary Secretary to the Minister of Citizenship and Immigration and the Minister of Human Resources and Skills Development with special emphasis on the Internationally Trained Workers Initiative.

=== In opposition ===
In 2006, she defeated high-profile New Democratic Party activist and former MP Svend Robinson and in 2008 she defeated high-profile Conservative Party candidate Lorne Mayencourt. On May 4, 2006, Fry became the 11th person, 3rd woman, and the only Westerner to officially enter the Liberal party leadership race. Fry launched her leadership campaign saying that Canada's diversity is its greatest competitive advantage - "our weapon of mass inclusion" - and called for a "non-ideological" approach to problem solving. She withdrew from the contest on September 25 and announced her support for Bob Rae.

Re-elected in Vancouver Centre for a sixth term in 2008, Fry was appointed the Official Opposition Critic for Canadian Heritage. On November 21, 2008, Liberal leadership candidate Bob Rae announced that Fry would serve as his Campaign Co-Chair in British Columbia.

Fry was re-elected in 2011 by a margin of approximately 2,000 votes. When the Liberals lost power in 2006, Fry was named as Critic for Sport Canada in the Liberal shadow cabinet. In 2011, as the Liberals lost their designation as Official Opposition, Fry was named Liberal Critic for Health.

=== Trudeau government ===
In the 2015 election, Fry won her riding once more, becoming the oldest Canadian MP and the longest serving female MP. She received 56.1% of the vote, the highest popular vote share of her career. During the 42nd Parliament, she was appointed to the National Security and Intelligence Committee of Parliamentarians, which provides oversight to Canada's security services and requires a Top Secret security clearance.

In the 2019 Election, Fry once again won her riding for a 9th consecutive term. Fry served as a member of the Standing Committee on Foreign Affairs and International Development, and the Special Committee on the COVID-19 Pandemic. Fry was re-elected again in the 2021 election.

Fry heads Canada's delegation to the Organization for Security and Cooperation in Europe's Parliamentary Assembly, and is the Special Representative for gender issues, a role she has held since 2010.

In 2024, Fry's office misfiled an expense to the Financial Management Office at the House of Commons.

=== Carney government ===
On April 28, 2025, Fry won her riding for the eleventh consecutive term, receiving 55.2% of the vote, the second-highest popular vote share of her career. She was elected chair of the Canadian House of Commons Standing Committee on Health in the 45th Canadian Parliament in 2025.

== Family ==
With her ex-husband, a British medical doctor, Fry has three adult sons and four grandchildren. Her eldest son, Pete Fry, was elected to Vancouver City Council in the 2018 municipal election and is the current mayor of Vancouver following the 2026 municipal election.

== Electoral record ==
2025 Canadian federal election: Vancouver Centre
Party	Candidate	Votes	%	±%	Expenditures
Liberal	Hedy Fry	29,855	55.22	+14.56	$101,446.10
Conservative	Elaine Allan	16,368	30.28	+8.38	$93,043.15
New Democratic	Avi Lewis	6,807	12.59	–17.75	$118,277.26
Green	Scott MacDonald	757	1.40	–2.41	none listed
People's	Christopher Varga	211	0.39	–2.89	none listed
Independent	Drew William McPherson	63	0.12	–	none listed
Total valid votes/expense limit		54,061	99.23	–	$131,689.42
Total rejected ballots		422	0.77	–0.04	
Turnout		54,483	63.17	+6.52	
Eligible voters		86,246			
Liberal notional hold		Swing		+3.09	
Source: Elections Canada

2021 Canadian federal election: Vancouver Centre
Party	Candidate	Votes	%	±%	Expenditures
Liberal	Hedy Fry	20,873	40.44	–1.74	$87,773.26
New Democratic	Breen Ouellette	15,869	30.74	+7.01	$70,387.43
Conservative	Harry Cockell	11,162	21.62	+2.35	$20,505.00
Green	Alaric Paivarinta	2,030	3.93	–8.58	$8,967.42
People's	Taylor Singleton-Fookes	1,683	3.26	+1.97	$3,574.44
Total valid votes/expense limit		51,617	99.19	–	$119,443.56
Total rejected ballots		422	0.81	+0.16	
Turnout		52,039	56.65	–4.40	
Eligible voters		91,864			
Liberal hold		Swing		–4.37	
Source: Elections Canada

2019 Canadian federal election: Vancouver Centre
Party	Candidate	Votes	%	±%	Expenditures
Liberal	Hedy Fry	23,599	42.18	–13.90	$90,142.18
New Democratic	Breen Ouellette	13,280	23.74	+3.72	$35,726.92
Conservative	David Cavey	10,782	19.27	+2.36	$28,533.10
Green	Jesse Brown	7,002	12.52	+6.71	$28,503.30
People's	Louise Kierans	724	1.29	–	$4,907.84
Libertarian	John Clarke	379	0.68	–0.38	none listed
Independent	Lily Bowman	142	0.25	–	none listed
Independent	Imtiaz Popat	38	0.07	–	none listed
Total valid votes/expense limit		55,946	99.35	–	$116,372.00
Total rejected ballots		364	0.65	+0.22	
Turnout		56,310	61.05	–4.85	
Eligible voters		92,243			
Liberal hold		Swing		–8.81	
Source: Elections Canada

2015 Canadian federal election: Vancouver Centre
Party	Candidate	Votes	%	±%	Expenditures
Liberal	Hedy Fry	32,554	56.08	+25.06	$126,090.21
New Democratic	Constance Barnes	11,618	20.01	–6.34	$102,184.82
Conservative	Elaine Allan	9,818	16.91	–9.14	$84,492.99
Green	Lisa Barrett	3,370	5.81	–9.27	$45,728.01
Libertarian	John Clarke	614	1.06	+0.53	none listed
Marxist–Leninist	Michael Hill	74	0.13	+0.02	none listed
Total valid votes/expense limit		58,048	99.58	–	$224,575.59
Total rejected ballots		247	0.42	+0.20	
Turnout		58,295	65.89	+8.18	
Eligible voters		88,470			
Liberal hold		Swing		+15.70	
Source: Elections Canada

2011 Canadian federal election: Vancouver Centre
Party	Candidate	Votes	%	±%	Expenditures
Liberal	Hedy Fry	18,260	31.03	–3.48	$91,536.75
New Democratic	Karen Margo Shillington	15,325	26.04	+4.73	$26,447.50
Conservative	Jennifer Clarke	15,323	26.04	+0.94	$65,135.53
Green	Adriane Carr	9,089	15.44	–2.87	$99,144.39
Libertarian	John Clarke	313	0.53	–0.07	none listed
Progressive Canadian	Michael Huenefeld	285	0.48	–	$666.48
Pirate	Travis McCrea	192	0.33	–	none listed
Marxist–Leninist	Michael Hill	62	0.11	–0.06	none listed
Total valid votes/expense limit		58,849	99.77	–	$100,554.26
Total rejected ballots		134	0.23	–0.10	
Turnout		58,983	57.71	–1.65	
Eligible voters		102,201			
Liberal hold		Swing		–4.10	
Source: Elections Canada

2008 Canadian federal election: Vancouver Centre
Party	Candidate	Votes	%	±%	Expenditures
Liberal	Hedy Fry	19,506	34.51	–9.30	$82,559.50
Conservative	Lorne Mayencourt	14,188	25.10	+4.64	$90,565.43
New Democratic	Michael Byers	12,047	21.31	–7.36	$83,751.31
Green	Adriane Carr	10,354	18.32	+12.47	$83,134.82
Libertarian	John Clarke	340	0.60	+0.07	none listed
Marxist–Leninist	Michael Hill	94	0.17	–	none listed
Total valid votes/expense limit		56,529	99.67	–	$94,404.49
Total rejected ballots		187	0.33	+0.05	
Turnout		56,716	59.37	–2.69	
Eligible voters		95,537			
Liberal hold		Swing		–6.97	
Source: Elections Canada

2006 Canadian federal election: Vancouver Centre
Party	Candidate	Votes	%	±%	Expenditures
Liberal	Hedy Fry	25,013	43.80	+3.49	$78,549.88
New Democratic	Svend Robinson	16,374	28.67	–3.62	$85,910.46
Conservative	Tony Fogarassy	11,684	20.46	+1.26	$80,430.10
Green	Jared Evans	3,340	5.85	–0.93	$1,008.00
Libertarian	John Clarke	304	0.53	–0.04	none listed
Marijuana	Heathcliff Dionysus Campbell	259	0.45	–	$163.15
Christian Heritage	Joe Pal	130	0.23	–0.23	$367.31
Total valid votes/expense limit		57,104	99.72	–	$86,257.47
Total rejected ballots		163	0.28	–0.14	
Turnout		57,267	62.06	+0.58	
Eligible voters		92,284			
Liberal hold		Swing		+3.56	
Source: Elections Canada

2004 Canadian federal election: Vancouver Centre
Party	Candidate	Votes	%	±%	Expenditures
Liberal	Hedy Fry	21,280	40.31	–1.99	$66,619.64
New Democratic	Kennedy Stewart	17,050	32.30	+20.25	$55,675.28
Conservative	Gary Mitchell	10,139	19.21	–18.70	$73,303.46
Green	Robbie Mattu	3,580	6.78	+2.84	$2,444.22
Libertarian	John Clarke	304	0.58	–	$60.00
Christian Heritage	Joe Pal	243	0.46	–	$1,877.46
Canadian Action	Alexander Frei	101	0.19	–1.09	none listed
Communist	Kimball Cariou	96	0.18	+0.01	$389.84
Total valid votes/expense limit		52,793	99.57	–	$81,169.20
Total rejected ballots		226	0.43	–0.05	
Turnout		53,019	61.47	+0.97	
Eligible voters		86,246			
Liberal hold		Swing		–11.12	
Change for the Conservatives is based on the combined totals of the Canadian Alliance and the Progressive Conservatives.
Source: Elections Canada

2000 Canadian federal election: Vancouver Centre
Party	Candidate	Votes	%	±%	Expenditures
Liberal	Hedy Fry	24,553	42.30	+1.54	$69,017
Alliance	John Mortimer	15,176	26.15	+3.56	$68,158
New Democratic	Scott Robertson	6,993	12.05	–8.82	$8,841
Progressive Conservative	Lee Johnson	6,828	11.76	+2.52	$4,047
Green	Jamie Lee Hamilton	2,285	3.94	+0.93	$3,945
Marijuana	Marc Emery	1,116	1.92	–	none listed
Canadian Action	Jeff Jewell	742	1.28	+0.25	$547
Natural Law	Valerie Laporte	177	0.30	–0.12	$40
Communist	Kimball Cariou	99	0.17	–	$189
Marxist–Leninist	Joseph Theriault	75	0.13	–0.10	$364
Total valid votes		58,044	99.52		
Total rejected ballots		280	0.48	–0.05	
Turnout		58,324	60.50	–4.10	
Eligible voters		96,399			
Liberal hold		Swing		–1.01	
Change for the Canadian Alliance is based on the Reform Party.
Source: Elections Canada

1997 Canadian federal election: Vancouver Centre
Party	Candidate	Votes	%	±%	Expenditures
Liberal	Hedy Fry	20,878	40.76	+9.67	$54,905
Reform	Richard Farbridge	11,567	22.58	+5.20	$24,846
New Democratic	Bill Siksay	10,690	20.87	+5.66	$27,133
Progressive Conservative	Victoria Minnes	4,736	9.24	–15.93	$43,121
Green	Paul Alexander	1,541	3.00	+2.06	$2,154
Independent	Joseph Roberts	728	1.42	–	$6,163
Canadian Action	Connie Fogal	528	1.03	–	$12,986
Natural Law	John Cowhig	217	0.42	−0.61	none listed
Independent	John Clarke	125	0.24	–	$2,687
Marxist–Leninist	Joseph Theriault	116	0.22	–	$559
Independent	Elvis Flostrand	92	0.17	–	$699
Total valid votes		51,126	99.47		
Total rejected ballots		272	0.53	–0.46	
Turnout		51,398	64.60	+0.02	
Eligible voters		79,563			
Liberal hold		Swing		+2.22	
Source: Elections Canada

1993 Canadian federal election: Vancouver Centre
Party	Candidate	Votes	%	±%
Liberal	Hedy Fry	20,095	31.09	+8.28
Progressive Conservative	Kim Campbell	16,274	25.18	–12.06
Reform	Ian Isbister	11,235	17.38	+16.00
New Democratic	Betty Baxter	9,830	15.21	–21.60
National	Thorsten Ewald	5,144	7.96	–
Natural Law	John Cowhig	670	1.04	–
Green	Imtiaz Popat	616	0.95	+0.14
Christian Heritage	Darren Lowe	254	0.39	–
Libertarian	Tunya Audain	252	0.39	+0.14
Independent	Brian Godzilla Gnu Salmi	109	0.17	–
Independent	Scott Adams	99	0.15	–0.04
Commonwealth of Canada	Lucille Boikoff	27	0.04	–
Independent	Peter C. Nuthall	24	0.04	–
Total valid votes		64,629	99.01	
Total rejected ballots		644	0.99	+0.51
Turnout		65,249	64.73	–12.89
Eligible voters		100,841		
Liberal gain from Progressive Conservative		Swing		+10.17
Source: Elections Canada

26th Canadian Ministry (1993–2003) – Cabinet of Jean Chrétien
Sub-Cabinet Post
Predecessor	Title	Successor
Sheila Finestone	Secretary of State (Multiculturalism) (Status of Women) (1996–2002)	Jean Augustine
