= Douglas Jung =

Canadian politician (1924–2002)

Douglas Jung CM OBC CD
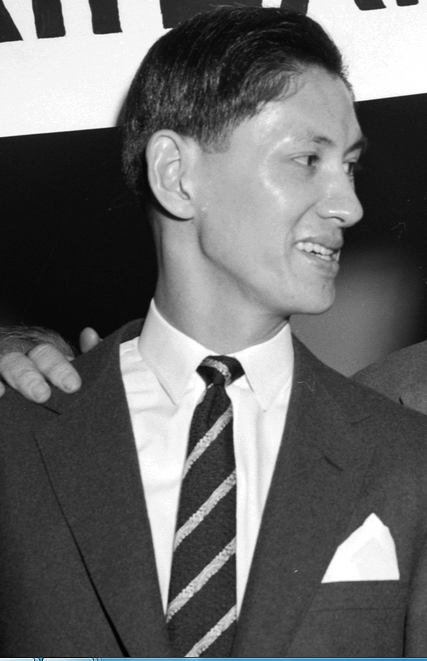

Member of the Canadian Parliament for Vancouver Centre
- In office June 10, 1957 – June 17, 1962
- Preceded by: Ralph Campney
- Succeeded by: John Robert Nicholson

Personal details
- Born: February 25, 1924 Victoria, British Columbia, Canada
- Died: January 4, 2002 (aged 77) Vancouver, British Columbia, Canada
- Party: Progressive Conservative
- Other political affiliations: BC Progressive Conservative
- Relatives: Major Ross Jung (brother); Flight-Lieutenant Arthur Ernest Jung RCAF (brother)
- Education: University of British Columbia
- Occupation: Lawyer; politician; military officer; secret agent
- Awards: Canadian Forces' Decoration; Order of Canada; Order of British Columbia

Military service
- Allegiance: Canada
- Branch/service: Canadian Army, Special Operations Executive
- Rank: Captain
- Unit: Force 136
- Battles/wars: World War II: British Borneo campaign; New Guinea campaign

Chinese name
- Traditional Chinese: 鄭天華
- Simplified Chinese: 郑天华
Transcriptions
Standard Mandarin
- Hanyu Pinyin: Zhèng Tiānhuá
Yue: Cantonese
- Jyutping: Zeng^{6} Tin^{1}-waa^{6}

Douglas Jung CM OBC CD (Chinese: 鄭天華; February 25, 1924 – January 4, 2002) was a Canadian lawyer, politician, military officer, and Special Operations Executive secret agent. He was the Member of Parliament (MP) for Vancouver Centre from 1957 to 1962, as part of the Progressive Conservative caucus. He was the first member of a visible minority elected to the Parliament of Canada, as well as the first MP of Chinese and Asian descent in the House of Commons of Canada.

== Early life, military career and education ==
Douglas Jung was born in Victoria, British Columbia, on February 25, 1924. During his childhood, the Government of Canada passed numerous pieces of legislation that disenfranchised Chinese in Canada. Jung and a group of young men from British Columbia enlisted in the Canadian Army during World War II in order to change the status of Chinese Canadians. Jung explained his reasons for enlisting as: "Some of us realized that unless we volunteered to serve Canada during this hour of need, we would be in a very difficult position after the war ended to demand our rights as Canadian citizens because the Canadian government would say to us, "What did you do during the war when everybody else was out fighting for Canada? What did you do?" So a few of us volunteered to serve, and my group was probably the first to join up."

=== World War II ===
Although Jung enlisted in the Canadian Army in 1939, he did not receive his first assignment until 1944, mainly because politicians in Ottawa and Victoria did not want to deal with the issues of enfranchising the Chinese after the war. However, Winston Churchill's wartime Special Operations Executive recruited Jung and a group of Chinese-Canadian soldiers into Force 136, a team of secret agents who deployed to British Malaya to train local guerrillas to resist the Japanese Imperial Army occupying Malaya and Singapore. The mission for the Asian Canadian soldiers was known as Operation Oblivion. They received parachute training at Australia and prepared themselves to fight in South West Pacific. However, the operation came to an abrupt cancellation. Jung instead deployed to Japanese-occupied British Borneo and New Guinea, and led his troops in search and rescue missions.

=== Post-WWII ===
After the war, Chinese in Canada were enfranchised in 1947. Veterans Affairs Canada provided funds so that Jung and his Chinese-Canadian comrades could obtain a university education. Jung graduated from the University of British Columbia with a bachelor of arts degree, followed by a bachelor of laws degree in 1953. He was called to the British Columbia Bar in 1954, then set up an immigration practice in Vancouver.

== Political career ==
Jung had vowed not to join the Liberal Party of Canada because of its racist legislation against Chinese in the past. Following the 1955 death of George Churchill Moxham, who represented Vancouver Centre in the Legislative Assembly of British Columbia, Jung was nominated as the BC Progressive Conservative candidate for the riding. He lost to Social Credit candidate Leslie Peterson in the January 1956 by-election, but still became the first Canadian of Chinese descent to run for a seat provincially or federally.

He then ran in the 1957 federal election as a candidate for the Progressive Conservative Party under John Diefenbaker, and defeated the incumbent Liberal candidate Ralph Campney to become MP for Vancouver Centre. In his maiden speech in the House of Commons, he urged Canada to take a leading role in serving as a bridge to the Pacific Rim countries. He was handily re-elected in the following year's federal election.

Jung's other achievements include taking part in the debate on the implementation in 1960 by Ellen Fairclough, Minister of Citizenship and Immigration, of the Chinese Adjustment Statement Program that granted amnesty to illegal immigrants from Hong Kong, also known as "paper sons". He also represented Canada in the United Nations as an alternate member of the Legal Delegation to the United Nations.

Jung was defeated in the 1962 federal election by Liberal John Robert Nicholson; voters in Vancouver's Chinatown community had become disillusioned by his handling of the amnesty issue, in which they viewed Jung as siding with government authorities against Chinese Canadians. Progressive Conservatives had also tried to strike 500-600 Chinese voters from the rolls in order to mitigate this issue. He returned to his legal practice after losing re-election; he ran again in the 1963 and 1965 federal elections, but lost to Nicholson both times.

== Honours and other achievements ==
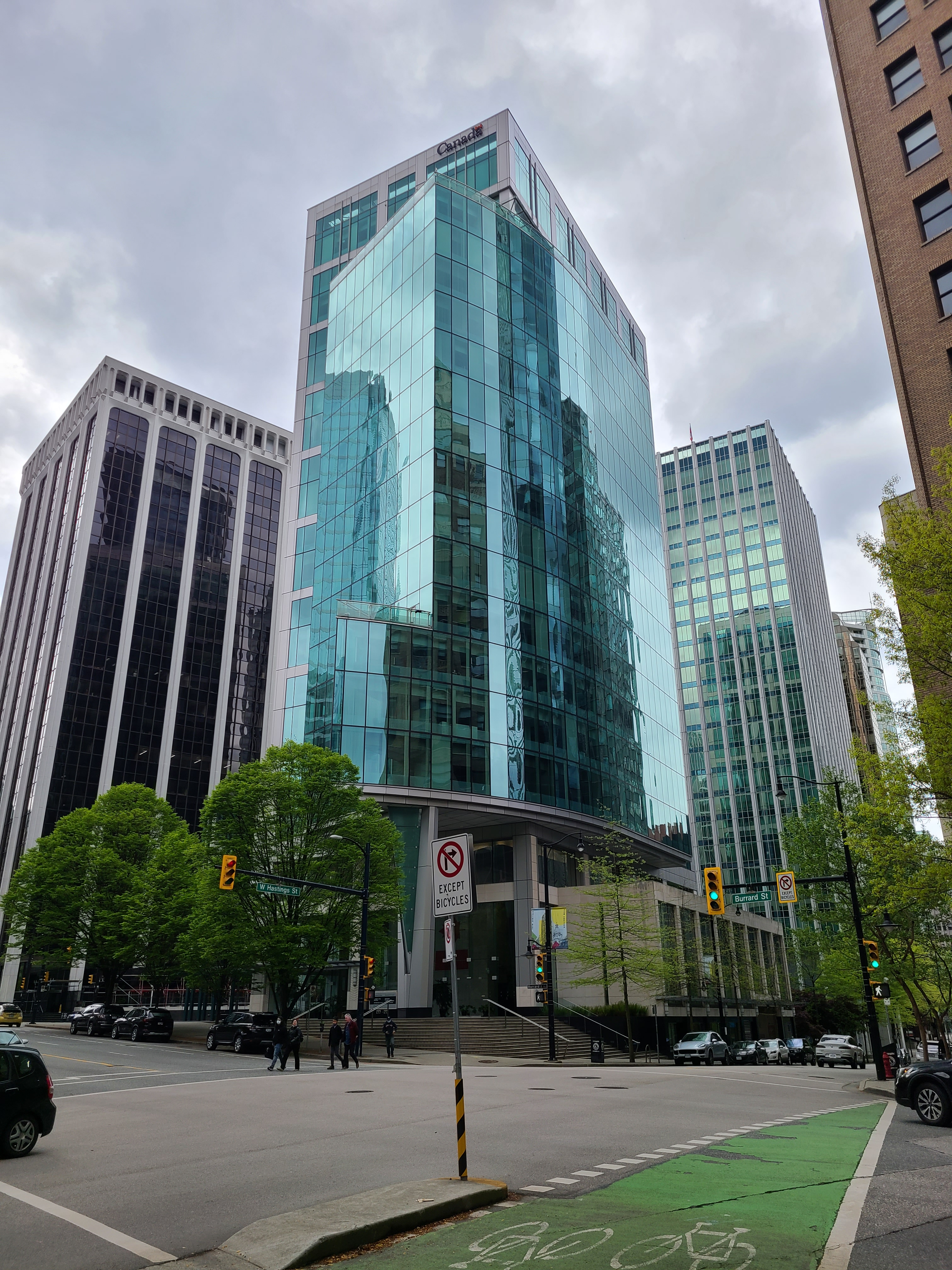
The Douglas Jung federal building

His profusion of honours included the Order of Canada and the Order of British Columbia, the highest honours a citizen can receive from the federal and provincial governments, respectively. Other awards came from the Chinese Benevolent Association, S.U.C.C.E.S.S., Chinese Canadian National Council and Chinese Association in Moose Jaw, Saskatchewan, Thunder Bay and Toronto, Ontario, as well as the Quebec Japanese Canadian Citizenship Association in Montreal.

Jung was also a prominent figure in the community, especially the Vancouver Chinese community. They include: Life President of Army Navy Air Force Veterans in Canada Unit #280; patron of S.U.C.C.E.S.S.; director of the Vancouver Symphony; deputy director of the Governor General's 1992 Regional Celebration of Canada 125th Anniversary; director of the Far East Relations of the Former Parliamentarians Association; and the President of Japan Karate Association of Canada, which awarded him a sixth degree Black Belt.

On September 7, 2007, Secretary of State for Multiculturalism and Canadian Identity Jason Kenney announced that the federal building located at 401 Burrard Street in Downtown Vancouver would be named after Douglas Jung, as the first Chinese-Canadian elected to Parliament.

== Death ==
While marching with fellow veterans in 1995, Jung suffered a serious heart attack. He never completely recovered and died in 2002 due to related complications.

== Electoral record ==
1965 Canadian federal election: Vancouver Centre
Party	Candidate	Votes	%	±%
Liberal	John Robert Nicholson	9,008	40.08	+0.75
Progressive Conservative	Douglas Jung	6,248	27.80	–2.73
New Democratic	Lyle Kristiansen	5,184	23.07	–1.13
Social Credit	William John McIntyre	1,806	8.04	+2.10
Independent Social Credit	James B. Wisbey	228	1.01	–
Total valid votes		22,474	98.60	
Total rejected ballots		319	1.40	+0.26
Turnout		22,793	65.85	–4.67
Eligible voters		34,615		
Liberal hold		Swing		+1.74
Source: Library of Parliament

1963 Canadian federal election: Vancouver Centre
Party	Candidate	Votes	%	±%
Liberal	John Robert Nicholson	9,472	39.33	+3.73
Progressive Conservative	Douglas Jung	7,353	30.53	–0.94
New Democratic	Margaret Erickson	5,826	24.19	+0.54
Social Credit	Bevis Walters	1,430	5.94	–2.29
Total valid votes		24,081	98.86	
Total rejected ballots		278	1.14	–0.21
Turnout		24,359	70.52	+1.81
Eligible voters		34,541		
Liberal hold		Swing		+2.34
Source: Library of Parliament

1962 Canadian federal election: Vancouver Centre
Party	Candidate	Votes	%	±%
Liberal	John Robert Nicholson	7,697	35.61	+18.43
Progressive Conservative	Douglas Jung	6,803	31.47	–29.95
New Democratic	Margaret Erickson	5,113	23.65	+9.73
Social Credit	George Hahn	1,779	8.23	+3.60
Independent	Burton V. White	224	1.04	–
Total valid votes		21,616	98.65	
Total rejected ballots		295	1.35	+0.05
Turnout		21,911	68.71	+3.99
Eligible voters		31,890		
Liberal gain from Progressive Conservative		Swing		+24.19
Change for the New Democrats is based on the Co-operative Commonwealth.
Source: Library of Parliament

1958 Canadian federal election: Vancouver Centre
Party	Candidate	Votes	%	±%
Progressive Conservative	Douglas Jung	14,044	61.43	+19.92
Liberal	Lyon Ward	3,927	17.18	–7.29
Co-operative Commonwealth	Alan Judge	3,183	13.92	+3.80
Social Credit	Cyril White	1,059	4.63	–16.87
Labor–Progressive	Maurice Rush	650	2.84	+0.43
Total valid votes		22,863	98.70	
Total rejected ballots		300	1.30	+0.10
Turnout		23,163	64.72	–0.66
Eligible voters		35,792		
Progressive Conservative hold		Swing		+13.60
Source: Library of Parliament

1957 Canadian federal election: Vancouver Centre
Party	Candidate	Votes	%	±%
Progressive Conservative	Douglas Jung	9,087	41.50	+32.86
Liberal	Ralph Campney	5,357	24.47	–16.37
Social Credit	Cyril White	4,707	21.50	–2.96
Co-operative Commonwealth	William James Dennison	2,216	10.12	–12.21
Labor–Progressive	Maurice Rush	528	2.41	–1.33
Total valid votes		21,895	98.81	
Total rejected ballots		264	1.19	+0.24
Turnout		22,159	65.37	+7.46
Eligible voters		33,896		
Progressive Conservative gain from Liberal		Swing		+24.62
Source: Library of Parliament

== See also ==
- Electoral firsts in Canada
