= Betty Baxter =

Canadian politician

- Born: 1952 (age 73–74); Brooks, Alberta
- Education: University of Alberta
- Occupations: Athlete, activist and politician
- Known for: Volleyball coaching

Betty Baxter (born 1952) is a Canadian athlete, activist and politician. Baxter was once a school trustee for the Sunshine Coast District 46 in British Columbia.

Baxter was a member of the Canadian women's national volleyball team at the 1976 Summer Olympics, and was later named the team's head coach in 1979. Prior to being named coach of the national team, Baxter was a women's volleyball coach at the University of Ottawa, and was named the Canadian Interuniversity Athletics Union's coach of the year in 1980.

However, she was fired from that role in 1982 for a variety of reasons, one of which was speculation about her sexuality after the media began to report rumours that she was lesbian. Baxter was not actually out as lesbian at the time, but subsequently came out and cofounded the Canadian Association for the Advancement of Women in Sport and the National Coaching School for Women, and served as a board member of the 1990 Gay Games in Vancouver.

Baxter ran as a New Democratic Party candidate in Vancouver Centre in the 1993 federal election, in a high-profile race against Prime Minister Kim Campbell, but was not elected. Baxter later was elected as a school trustee in 2011.

== Electoral record ==
1993 Canadian federal election: Vancouver Centre
Party	Candidate	Votes	%	±%
Liberal	Hedy Fry	20,095	31.09	+8.28
Progressive Conservative	Kim Campbell	16,274	25.18	–12.06
Reform	Ian Isbister	11,235	17.38	+16.00
New Democratic	Betty Baxter	9,830	15.21	–21.60
National	Thorsten Ewald	5,144	7.96	–
Natural Law	John Cowhig	670	1.04	–
Green	Imtiaz Popat	616	0.95	+0.14
Christian Heritage	Darren Lowe	254	0.39	–
Libertarian	Tunya Audain	252	0.39	+0.14
Independent	Brian Godzilla Gnu Salmi	109	0.17	–
Independent	Scott Adams	99	0.15	–0.04
Commonwealth of Canada	Lucille Boikoff	27	0.04	–
Independent	Peter C. Nuthall	24	0.04	–
Total valid votes		64,629	99.01	
Total rejected ballots		644	0.99	+0.51
Turnout		65,249	64.73	–12.89
Eligible voters		100,841		
Liberal gain from Progressive Conservative		Swing		+10.17
Source: Elections Canada
