= Michael Byers (Canadian author) =

Canadian legal scholar and non-fiction author

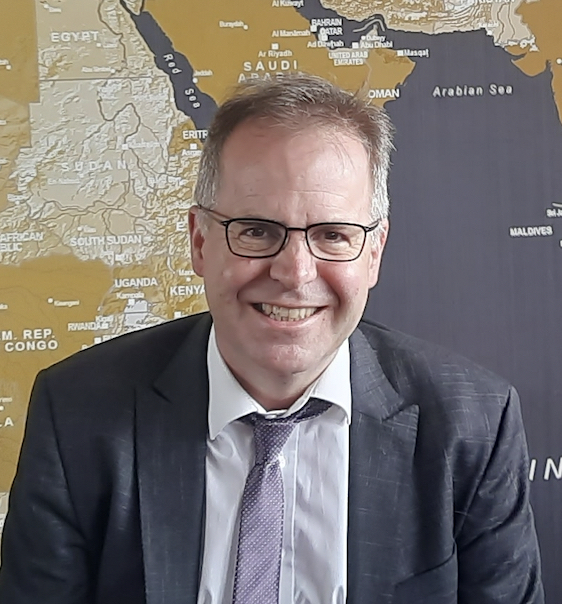
Michael Byers, pictured after delivering a guest lecture at Jagiellonian University in Kraków, Poland, in June 2023.

Michael Byers is a Canadian legal scholar and non-fiction author.

== Academic background ==
Byers was educated at the University of Saskatchewan, where he received his BA (honours) with majors in English literature and political studies. He then studied law at McGill University, achieving his LLB and BCL degrees in 1992. He completed his studies at University of Cambridge, where he received his PhD in international law. Before becoming a professor of political science at University of British Columbia in 2004, he was a research fellow from 1996 until 1999 at University of Oxford, and from 1999 until 2004, he was a professor of law and the director of Canadian Studies at Duke University.

Since 2004, he has held the Canada Research Chair in Global Politics and International Law at the University of British Columbia in Vancouver, British Columbia. From 2017 to 2019, he was concurrently appointed to the Brenda and David McLean Chair in Canadian Studies at UBC. Byers has also taught as a visiting professor at the universities of Tel Aviv, Cape Town, Nord (Norway) and Novosibirsk (Russia). During the 2021-2022 academic year, he was a Senior Global Fellow at the University of St Andrews. In 2023, Byers was a Fellow of the Kolleg-Forschungsgruppe “The International Rule of Law - Rise or Decline?” of the Freie Universität Berlin, Humboldt Universität zu Berlin, Universität Potsdam and Wissenschaftszentrum Berlin. In 2024, he was a Visiting Professor at the Geneva Graduate Institute.

Byers serves as chair of the board of the Salt Spring Forum, a charitable organization that organizes an annual speakers’ series on Salt Spring Island, BC. Past guests include Noam Chomsky, Louise Arbour, Conrad Black, Andrew Coyne, Amy Goodman, Chantal Hebert, Naomi Klein, Bill McKibben, David Suzuki, Jon Kimura Parker, Carol Off, Joe Clark, and Rachel Notley.

== Political engagement ==
In February 2004, as Director of Duke University's Center for Canadian Studies, Byers hosted Jack Layton in Durham, North Carolina. Later, after Byers’ return to Canada, he began to advise Layton on Canadian defence and foreign policy, most notably with regards to Canada's role in the war in Afghanistan.

On July 2, 2008, Byers announced that he was seeking the New Democratic Party nomination for the federal riding of Vancouver Centre, a seat held by Liberal Party of Canada incumbent Hedy Fry since 1993, in the next Canadian federal election. Byers had not previously sought elected office and the Liberal Party had tried to attract him as a candidate, with Liberal leader Stéphane Dion inviting him for a beer in spring 2008.

Byers received much attention because he was considered by many to be a "star" candidate for the NDP.

During the campaign, Byers was sharply critical of the Harper government's supposed militarization of the Arctic; he also advocated a negotiation with the Taliban in Afghanistan. At a candidates' debate at the end of September 2008, Byers made the controversial statement that the Alberta tar sands needed to be shut down "to address the global climate crisis". The Liberal and Green candidates claimed that this position contradicted the official NDP platform, while Byers believed that it was covered by already passed legislation calling on Canada to reduce carbon dioxide emissions by 80 per cent by 2050.

After the national NDP campaign faltered, Fry won reelection with 19,423 votes (34.4% of the popular vote). Byers ran third, with 12,043 votes (21.3%).

In 2010, Byers advised Conservative Foreign Minister Lawrence Cannon on Canada's Arctic Foreign Policy Statement. In May 2017, Cannon announced that he would be starting a PhD under Byers' supervision at UBC.

After Jack Layton's death in August 2011, Byers supported Tom Mulcair's successful campaign for the leadership of the federal NDP.

== Writing and advocacy ==
His books include Custom, Power and the Power of Rules (Cambridge University Press 1999), The Role of Law in International Politics (Oxford University Press 2000), US Hegemony and the Foundations of International Law (Cambridge University Press 2003), War Law (Atlantic Books and, in Canada, Douglas & McIntyre, 2005), and Intent for a Nation: What Is Canada For? (Douglas & McIntyre 2007) (playing against George Grant's Lament for a Nation). In 2009, he wrote Who Owns the Arctic? (Douglas & McIntyre 2009), which was shorted for the Donner Prize for the best Canadian book on public policy. Four years later, his International Law and the Arctic (Cambridge University Press 2013) won the Donner Prize.

In 2023, Byers and astrophysicist Aaron Boley co-authored Who Owns Outer Space? International Law, Astrophysics, and the Sustainable Development of Space The book was published “open access” by Cambridge University Press.

Who Owns Outer Space? International Law, Astrophysics, and the Sustainable Development of Space was awarded the $60,000 Donner Prize for the best public policy book by a Canadian. This made Byers only the second person to win the Donner Prize twice, with the other being Tom Courchene.

The American Society of International Law awarded the book its 2023 Certificate of Merit in a Specialized Area of International Law.

Byers is a regular contributor to The Globe and Mail. His articles have also been published in international newspapers, including the Washington Post, Wall Street Journal, Times of London, Independent on Sunday, The Guardian, and London Review of Books.

His political positions include the following:

=== Liberal–NDP coalition ===
In November 2009, Byers suggested that the Liberal Party of Canada and the New Democratic Party (NDP) "should agree to not run candidates against each other in the next campaign" in electoral ridings in order to prevent the Conservative Party of Canada from forming another minority government. However, critics pointed out that his reasoning is based on the assumption that Liberal voters who are denied the ability to vote for a Liberal candidate would automatically vote for a NDP candidate, and that many might instead vote for the Conservatives (or simply not vote at all). NDP MP Nathan Cullen made the same argument as Byers in his 2011–12 campaign for the federal NDP leadership.

=== Lockheed Martin F-35 Lightning II purchase ===
Byers was a vocal opponent of the Harper government's proposed purchase of Lockheed Martin F-35 Lightning II fighter jets.

In July 2010, he wrote:

The F-35 is a stealth fighter designed to penetrate radar defences on the first day of a war. It's the sort of plane you would use to create 'shock and awe' in Baghdad or Tehran. Unless Canada is planning on being the sharp end of the American spear, we don't need stealth technology. The F-35 is designed for short takeoff and landing, with two of the three versions destined for aircraft carriers. Canada, of course, doesn't have aircraft carriers. And all that stealth technology and short takeoff and landing capacity comes at a cost. In addition to the price tag of about $135 million per plane, the F-35 has a relatively short range. This makes it an odd choice for a large, sparsely populated country.

In June 2014, he returned to the subject, comparing the 1960-era Lockheed CF-104 Starfighter and the F-35 Lightning. Both single engine planes are strike aircraft as opposed to air-superiority fighters and are poorly suited for dog-fighting. The single engine makes both vulnerable to failure: 110 of the 239 CF-104 Starfighters crashed before they were replaced by the CF-18s; one quarter of those crashes were attributed to bird strikes. Furthermore, the F-35 Lightning will be equipped with 24 million lines of computer code, making it vulnerable to EMP warfare.

And in March 2025, he argued, in the context of Donald Trump’s threats to make Canada the 51st state, that Canada should not acquire F-35s—because the US would always retain some control over the heavily computerized planes.

=== Arctic sovereignty ===
Byers has written extensively on issues of Arctic sovereignty.

In 2007 Byers was critical of the Harper government's change of plans for building new ice-strengthened patrol ships. The previous year, the Harper government had announced plans to build three heavy-duty icebreakers, but in 2007, the Harper government revised the plan to build six to eight dual use vessels, which would only be capable of operations in one metre of first-year sea ice.

Byers agreed with a 2010 report prepared for the Senate of Canada that Canadian Coast Guard vessels patrolling the Arctic should be armed, stating, the "quiet authority of a deck-mounted gun" is not a provocation.

On December 28, 2011, the Toronto Star published an article by Byers entitled "Russia pulling ahead in the Arctic". In that article he noted that Canada and Russia have taken identical positions as to whether they exercise sovereignty over the Northwest Passage and Northern Sea Route. Byers also quoted a leaked US diplomatic cable that reported that Prime Minister of Canada Stephen Harper believed that relations with Russia in the Arctic were good and would not lead to war.

Also on December 28, 2011, Al Jazeera published an article by Byers entitled "The dragon looks north", about China's recent exploration efforts in the Arctic. He suggested China didn't need to challenge the sovereignty of coastal countries in the Arctic because those countries were open to foreign investment and trade and saw the benefits of Chinese capital and Chinese markets.

In 2017, Byers published an article in the journal International Relations entitled "Crises and International Cooperation: An Arctic Case Study".

=== Pinochet case ===
Byers was involved in the 1998–1999 extradition case concerning former Chilean military ruler Augusto Pinochet in the British House of Lords, working with Ian Brownlie QC and members of a legal team representing Amnesty International and other human rights organizations. One of Byers' roles was to speak with the British and international media. He also wrote about the Pinochet case in the Times of London, the London Review of Books, the British Yearbook of International Law, and the Duke Journal of Comparative and International Law.

=== Afghan detainees ===
Byers has been involved in the issue of Afghan detainees since January 2002, when he wrote the first widely read op-ed article about Guantanamo Bay detention camp, which was published in The Guardian newspaper. In September 2005, Byers wrote an article in The Globe and Mail newspaper questioning the legality of Canadian troops transferring Afghan detainees to US custody. When Canada and Afghanistan entered into a transfer agreement three months later, Byers questioned the legality of that agreement, and detainee transfers made under it, before Parliamentary committees, in a press conference with Amir Attaran, and through two open letters to the Prosecutor of the International Criminal Court co-authored with William Schabas. In June 2016, Byers and Schabas called on the new Canadian government to open war crimes investigations.

=== Climate change ===
Byers served as principal investigator of the Climate Justice Project, a SSHRC-funded Community-University Research Alliance between the University of British Columbia and the British Columbia office of the Canadian Centre for Policy Alternatives. The $1.6 million project examined the nexus between climate change policy and social justice, with British Columbia serving as a case study for these issues of global consequence.

In 2017, Byers co-authored a lengthy article on "The Internationalization of Climate Damages Litigation” in the Washington Journal of Environmental Law and Policy. Byers has also written about climate change for the Globe and Mail, including a highly personal 2023 essay, and a 2025 warning of the severe consequences for Canada of the International Court of Justice’s Advisory Opinion on Climate Change.

=== Outer space ===
Byers began working on space issues in 2007 when Canada's largest space company, MacDonald, Dettwiler and Associates (MDA), now a part of Maxar Technologies, wished to sell itself to a US arms manufacturer. MDA is a world leader in synthetic aperture radar satellites such as Radarsat-2, which can produce high resolution images at night and through clouds. Byers appeared before Parliamentary committees and wrote articles in the Globe and Mail and (together with Scott Brison) in the National Post. The Harper government ultimately blocked the sale, based on the importance of the satellites for Arctic security.

Byers has written a number of op-ed articles on space issues, including a piece in the Washington Post entitled "Elon Musk, President of Mars?" and pieces in the Globe and Mail on space debris, asteroid mining, space tourism, solar storms, and planetary defence. In 2017, Byers and his teenage son Cameron published an article in the journal Polar Record entitled "Toxic Splash: Russian rocket stages dropped in Arctic waters raise health, environmental and legal concerns".

Since 2018, Byers has been collaborating with UBC astrophysicist Aaron Boley. Together, they established the Outer Space Institute (now a permanent observer at the United Nations Committee on the Peaceful Uses of Outer Space); published articles on space mining in Science, satellite megaconstellations in Scientific Reports, uncontrolled rocket body reentries in Nature Astronomy, and airspace closures due to rocket body reentries in Scientific Reports; and organized international open letters on space mining, kinetic anti-satellite weapon testing, and uncontrolled rocket body reentries. In 2023, they co-authored Who Owns Outer Space? International Law, Astrophysics, and the Sustainable Development of Space The book was published “open access” by Cambridge University Press.

=== Russian invasion of Ukraine ===
Byers wrote several op-ed articles for the Globe and Mail newspaper that resulted in his being added to Russia’s sanctions list. On March 3, 2022, just ten days after the invasion of Ukraine, he assessed early reports of the Russian military’s actions against the rules of international humanitarian law to ask whether President Vladimir Putin is a war criminal. In November 2022, he wrote about how the targeting of power plants and transformers across Ukrainian territory likely amounted to a crime against humanity because it deliberately put millions of civilians at risk of hypothermia, contaminated water supplies, and delays in medical care and emergency response. In March 2023, he wrote about how an arrest warrant for Putin, issued by the International Criminal Court, would likely cause China to hold back on the provision of weapons and other support.

In January 2023, Byers called upon Canada to provide some of its Leopard 2 tanks to Ukraine. Eight tanks were subsequently provided. Along with Aaron Boley, Byers also wrote two articles about why cooperation with Russia on the International Space Station continued. In June 2023, he wrote about the breach of the Kakhovka dam on the Dnipro River as a potential war crime.

=== Middle East ===
Byers was a visiting professor at Tel Aviv University in 2004, teaching a course on the laws of war. He wrote about the experience in his 2005 book War Law. Byers has written on Israel and Palestine for the Globe and Mail on five occasions, in 2006, 2009, 2023, 2024, and 2025. He also wrote a longer essay about teaching the Gaza War at UBC. Byers ended the 2023 article with a quote from U.S. Secretary of State Antony Blinken: “We democracies distinguish ourselves from terrorists by striving for a different standard – even when it’s difficult – and holding ourselves to account when we fall short.”

== Personal life ==
Byers is married to Katharine Byers (née Edmunds) who he met at Oxford University in 1996. They have two adult children.

Byers was an accomplished middle-distance runner in his youth, representing Canada at the Junior (<19) and Espoir (<23) levels before a serious injury prompted him to focus on academics. He was a member of a University of Saskatchewan team that won the Canadian university indoor athletics championships, an “All Canadian” at cross country (representing McGill University), and a “Blue” and Varsity Match champion at Cambridge University.

== Electoral history ==
2008 Canadian federal election: Vancouver Centre
Party	Candidate	Votes	%	±%	Expenditures
Liberal	Hedy Fry	19,506	34.51	–9.30	$82,559.50
Conservative	Lorne Mayencourt	14,188	25.10	+4.64	$90,565.43
New Democratic	Michael Byers	12,047	21.31	–7.36	$83,751.31
Green	Adriane Carr	10,354	18.32	+12.47	$83,134.82
Libertarian	John Clarke	340	0.60	+0.07	none listed
Marxist–Leninist	Michael Hill	94	0.17	–	none listed
Total valid votes/expense limit		56,529	99.67	–	$94,404.49
Total rejected ballots		187	0.33	+0.05	
Turnout		56,716	59.37	–2.69	
Eligible voters		95,537			
Liberal hold		Swing		–6.97	
Source: Elections Canada
