= John Robert Nicholson =

Canadian politician

The Honourable John Robert Nicholson PC OBE QC
- Official 1966 portrait

21st Lieutenant Governor of British Columbia
- In office July 2, 1968 – February 13, 1973
- Monarch: Elizabeth II
- Governor General: Roland Michener
- Premier: W. A. C. Bennett; Dave Barrett
- Preceded by: George Pearkes
- Succeeded by: Walter Stewart Owen

Member of the Canadian Parliament for Vancouver Centre
- In office June 18, 1962 – June 25, 1968
- Preceded by: Douglas Jung
- Succeeded by: Ron Basford

Personal details
- Born: December 1, 1901 Newcastle, NB, Canada
- Died: October 8, 1983 (aged 81) Victoria, BC, Canada
- Party: Liberal
- Education: Dalhousie University (LLB)
- Occupation: Lawyer
- Cabinet: Minister of Forestry (1963–1964); Postmaster General (1964–1965); Minister of Citizenship and Immigration (1965); Minister of Labour (1965–1968)

John Robert "Jack" Nicholson, PC OBE QC (December 1, 1901 – October 8, 1983) was a Canadian lawyer, businessman, politician and the 21st Lieutenant Governor of British Columbia.

Born in Newcastle, New Brunswick (now Miramichi), he graduated from the Dalhousie University law school in Halifax. In 1924, he moved to Vancouver, British Columbia and practised law.

During World War II, he was a deputy controller in the Department of Munitions and Supplies. From 1942 to 1951, he was the head of a crown corporation, Polymer Corporation, and from 1952 to 1956, the head of Brazilian Light and Power Co in Rio de Janeiro.

In 1962, Nicholson was elected to the Canadian House of Commons for the riding of Vancouver Centre and was re-elected in 1963 and 1965. From 1963 to 1964, he was the Minister of Forestry. From 1964 to 1965, he was the Postmaster General. In 1965, he was the Minister of Citizenship and Immigration. From 1965 to 1968, he was the Minister of Labour.

From 1968 to 1973, he served as the Lieutenant Governor of British Columbia.

== Electoral history ==
1965 Canadian federal election: Vancouver Centre
Party	Candidate	Votes	%	±%
Liberal	John Robert Nicholson	9,008	40.08	+0.75
Progressive Conservative	Douglas Jung	6,248	27.80	–2.73
New Democratic	Lyle Kristiansen	5,184	23.07	–1.13
Social Credit	William John McIntyre	1,806	8.04	+2.10
Independent Social Credit	James B. Wisbey	228	1.01	–
Total valid votes		22,474	98.60	
Total rejected ballots		319	1.40	+0.26
Turnout		22,793	65.85	–4.67
Eligible voters		34,615		
Liberal hold		Swing		+1.74
Source: Library of Parliament

1963 Canadian federal election: Vancouver Centre
Party	Candidate	Votes	%	±%
Liberal	John Robert Nicholson	9,472	39.33	+3.73
Progressive Conservative	Douglas Jung	7,353	30.53	–0.94
New Democratic	Margaret Erickson	5,826	24.19	+0.54
Social Credit	Bevis Walters	1,430	5.94	–2.29
Total valid votes		24,081	98.86	
Total rejected ballots		278	1.14	–0.21
Turnout		24,359	70.52	+1.81
Eligible voters		34,541		
Liberal hold		Swing		+2.34
Source: Library of Parliament

1962 Canadian federal election: Vancouver Centre
Party	Candidate	Votes	%	±%
Liberal	John Robert Nicholson	7,697	35.61	+18.43
Progressive Conservative	Douglas Jung	6,803	31.47	–29.95
New Democratic	Margaret Erickson	5,113	23.65	+9.73
Social Credit	George Hahn	1,779	8.23	+3.60
Independent	Burton V. White	224	1.04	–
Total valid votes		21,616	98.65	
Total rejected ballots		295	1.35	+0.05
Turnout		21,911	68.71	+3.99
Eligible voters		31,890		
Liberal gain from Progressive Conservative		Swing		+24.19
Change for the New Democrats is based on the Co-operative Commonwealth.
Source: Library of Parliament

Political offices
Preceded by Martial Asselin	Minister of Forestry; 1963–1964	Succeeded by Maurice Sauvé
