= Vancouver Centre (federal electoral district) =

Federal electoral district in British Columbia, Canada

Coordinates: 49.28°N 123.12°W

British Columbia electoral district
- Interactive map of riding boundaries from the 2025 federal election

Federal electoral district
- Legislature: House of Commons
MP
Hedy Fry
Liberal
- District created: 1914
- First contested: 1917
- Last contested: 2025
- District webpage: profile, map

Demographics
- Population (2021): 126,995
- Electors (2021): 91,276
- Area (km²): 11.20
- Pop. density (per km²): 11,338.8
- Census division: Metro Vancouver
- Census subdivision: Vancouver (part)

Vancouver Centre (French: Vancouver-Centre) is a federal electoral district in British Columbia, Canada, that has been represented in the House of Commons of Canada since 1917. It includes the neighbourhoods of downtown Vancouver, the West End, Yaletown, False Creek and Stanley Park.

The district has been represented by Hedy Fry, a former physician and a member of the Liberal Party of Canada, since 1993.

== Geography ==
The riding includes the neighbourhoods of Yaletown, the West End, Coal Harbour, Downtown Vancouver, western Strathcona, eastern Kitsilano, and False Creek South. The heavily urbanized electoral district is by far the most densely populated in Western Canada, with almost all of its residents living in mid- and high-rise apartments. The riding has a diverse, multi-generational demographic.

== Demographics ==
According to the 2021 Canadian census

- Languages (2021 mother tongue) : 55.2% English, 4.8% Mandarin, 4.6% Iranian Persian, 4% Spanish, 2.9% Yue, 2.5% French, 2.5% Korean, 1.9% Russian, 1.8% Portuguese, 1.7% Japanese, 1% German

Panethnic groups in Vancouver Centre (2011−2021)
| Panethnic group | 2021 | | 2016 | | 2011 | |
| Panethnic group | Pop. | % | Pop. | % | Pop. | % |
|---|---|---|---|---|---|---|
| European (Note: Statistic includes all persons that did not make up part of a visible minority or an indigenous identity.) | 70,670 | 56.77% | 71,345 | 62.48% | 65,120 | 64.45% |
| East Asian (Note: Statistic includes total responses of "Chinese", "Korean", and "Japanese" under visible minority section on census.) | 21,985 | 17.66% | 19,505 | 17.08% | 17,065 | 16.89% |
| Middle Eastern (Note: Statistic includes total responses of "West Asian" and "Arab" under visible minority section on census.) | 8,455 | 6.79% | 6,680 | 5.85% | 5,765 | 5.71% |
| South Asian | 6,275 | 5.04% | 4,150 | 3.63% | 2,990 | 2.96% |
| Latin American | 5,650 | 4.54% | 3,460 | 3.03% | 2,605 | 2.58% |
| Southeast Asian (Note: Statistic includes total responses of "Filipino" and "Southeast Asian" under visible minority section on census.) | 4,265 | 3.43% | 3,520 | 3.08% | 3,470 | 3.43% |
| Indigenous | 2,615 | 2.1% | 2,305 | 2.02% | 1,740 | 1.72% |
| African | 1,730 | 1.39% | 1,300 | 1.14% | 1,005 | 0.99% |
| Other (Note: Statistic includes total responses of "Visible minority, n.i.e." and "Multiple visible minorities" under visible minority section on census.) | 2,825 | 2.27% | 1,930 | 1.69% | 1,275 | 1.26% |
| Total responses | 124,475 | 98.02% | 114,190 | 98.07% | 101,040 | 98.59% |
| Total population | 126,995 | 100% | 116,443 | 100% | 102,480 | 100% |
Notes: Totals greater than 100% due to multiple origin responses. Demographics based on 2012 Canadian federal electoral redistribution riding boundaries.

It is the riding with the biggest Japanese community in Canada. As per the 2021 census, 2.4% of the population of Vancouver-Centre is Japanese.

== History ==
The electoral district was created in 1914 from parts of Vancouver City riding.

Canada's longest-serving female member of Parliament (MP), Hedy Fry, has represented Vancouver Centre since 1993. Another high-profile MP was Kim Campbell, who was elected in 1988, served in Brian Mulroney's cabinet, then served as Prime Minister for 132 days before being defeated by Fry.

The 2012 federal electoral boundaries redistribution concluded that the electoral boundaries of Vancouver Centre should be adjusted, and a modified electoral district of the same name would be contested in future elections. The redefined Vancouver Centre lost a portion of territory from its southern end to the new district of Vancouver Granville. These new boundaries were legally defined in the 2013 representation order, which came into effect upon the call of the 42nd Canadian federal election, scheduled for October 2015.

=== Historical boundaries ===
1914 representation order

1933 representation order

1947 representation order

1952 representation order

1966 representation order

1976 representation order

1987 representation order

1996 representation order

2003 representation order

2013 representation order

2023 representation order

== Members of Parliament ==
This riding has elected the following members of Parliament:

| Parliament | Years | Member | Party |
|---|---|---|---|
Vancouver Centre; Riding created from Vancouver City
| 13th | 1917–1921 | Henry Herbert Stevens | Government (Unionist) |
| 14th | 1921–1925 | Henry Herbert Stevens | Conservative |
| 15th | 1925–1926 | Henry Herbert Stevens | Conservative |
| 16th | 1926–1930 | Henry Herbert Stevens | Conservative |
| 17th | 1930–1935 | Ian Alistair Mackenzie | Liberal |
| 18th | 1935–1940 | Ian Alistair Mackenzie | Liberal |
| 19th | 1940–1945 | Ian Alistair Mackenzie | Liberal |
| 20th | 1945–1948 | Ian Alistair Mackenzie | Liberal |
| 20th | 1948–1949 | Rodney Young | Co-operative Commonwealth |
| 21st | 1949–1953 | Ralph Campney | Liberal |
| 22nd | 1953–1957 | Ralph Campney | Liberal |
| 23rd | 1957–1958 | Douglas Jung | Progressive Conservative |
| 24th | 1958–1962 | Douglas Jung | Progressive Conservative |
| 25th | 1962–1963 | John Robert Nicholson | Liberal |
| 26th | 1963–1965 | John Robert Nicholson | Liberal |
| 27th | 1965–1968 | John Robert Nicholson | Liberal |
| 28th | 1968–1972 | Ron Basford | Liberal |
| 29th | 1972–1974 | Ron Basford | Liberal |
| 30th | 1974–1979 | Ron Basford | Liberal |
| 31st | 1979–1980 | Art Phillips | Liberal |
| 32nd | 1980–1984 | Pat Carney | Progressive Conservative |
| 33rd | 1984–1988 | Pat Carney | Progressive Conservative |
| 34th | 1988–1993 | Kim Campbell | Progressive Conservative |
| 35th | 1993–1997 | Hedy Fry | Liberal |
| 36th | 1997–2000 | Hedy Fry | Liberal |
| 37th | 2000–2004 | Hedy Fry | Liberal |
| 38th | 2004–2006 | Hedy Fry | Liberal |
| 39th | 2006–2008 | Hedy Fry | Liberal |
| 40th | 2008–2011 | Hedy Fry | Liberal |
| 41st | 2011–2015 | Hedy Fry | Liberal |
| 42nd | 2015–2019 | Hedy Fry | Liberal |
| 43rd | 2019–2021 | Hedy Fry | Liberal |
| 44th | 2021–2025 | Hedy Fry | Liberal |
| 45th | 2025–present | Hedy Fry | Liberal |

== Party performance over time ==
Line graph of election results in Vancouver Centre
(only showing parties that have received substantial support in multiple elections)
Significant one-offs omitted: Independent 1920 (10.4%); Labour 1917 (5%) 1925 (9.1%); Reconstructionist 1935 (8.3%); National 1993 (8%) View source data.

== Election results ==
2025 Canadian federal election
| Party | Candidate | Votes | % | ±% | Expenditures |
|---|---|---|---|---|---|
| Liberal | Hedy Fry | 29,855 | 55.22 | +14.56 | $101,446.10 |
| Conservative | Elaine Allan | 16,368 | 30.28 | +8.38 | $93,043.15 |
| New Democratic | Avi Lewis | 6,807 | 12.59 | –17.75 | $118,277.26 |
| Green | Scott MacDonald | 757 | 1.40 | –2.41 | none listed |
| People's | Christopher Varga | 211 | 0.39 | –2.89 | none listed |
| Independent | Drew William McPherson | 63 | 0.12 | – | none listed |
| Total valid votes/expense limit | | 54,061 | 99.23 | – | $131,689.42 |
| Total rejected ballots | | 422 | 0.77 | –0.04 | |
| Turnout | | 54,483 | 63.17 | +6.52 | |
| Eligible voters | | 86,246 | | | |
| Liberal notional hold | | Swing | | +3.09 | |
Source: Elections Canada

2021 federal election redistributed results based on the 2022 Canadian federal electoral redistribution (Note: Indicates what the riding results would have been had the 2021 election taken place using the updated riding boundaries from the 2022 Canadian federal electoral redistribution)
| Party | Vote | % |
|---|---|---|
| Liberal | 18,562 | 40.67 |
| New Democratic | 13,849 | 30.34 |
| Conservative | 9,994 | 21.90 |
| Green | 1,737 | 3.81 |
| People's | 1,498 | 3.28 |
| Rejected | 369 | — |

2021 Canadian federal election
| Party | Candidate | Votes | % | ±% | Expenditures |
|---|---|---|---|---|---|
| Liberal | Hedy Fry | 20,873 | 40.44 | –1.74 | $87,773.26 |
| New Democratic | Breen Ouellette | 15,869 | 30.74 | +7.01 | $70,387.43 |
| Conservative | Harry Cockell | 11,162 | 21.62 | +2.35 | $20,505.00 |
| Green | Alaric Paivarinta | 2,030 | 3.93 | –8.58 | $8,967.42 |
| People's | Taylor Singleton-Fookes | 1,683 | 3.26 | +1.97 | $3,574.44 |
| Total valid votes/expense limit | | 51,617 | 99.19 | – | $119,443.56 |
| Total rejected ballots | | 422 | 0.81 | +0.16 | |
| Turnout | | 52,039 | 56.65 | –4.40 | |
| Eligible voters | | 91,864 | | | |
| Liberal hold | | Swing | | –4.37 | |
Source: Elections Canada

2019 Canadian federal election
| Party | Candidate | Votes | % | ±% | Expenditures |
|---|---|---|---|---|---|
| Liberal | Hedy Fry | 23,599 | 42.18 | –13.90 | $90,142.18 |
| New Democratic | Breen Ouellette | 13,280 | 23.74 | +3.72 | $35,726.92 |
| Conservative | David Cavey | 10,782 | 19.27 | +2.36 | $28,533.10 |
| Green | Jesse Brown | 7,002 | 12.52 | +6.71 | $28,503.30 |
| People's | Louise Kierans | 724 | 1.29 | – | $4,907.84 |
| Libertarian | John Clarke | 379 | 0.68 | –0.38 | none listed |
| Independent | Lily Bowman | 142 | 0.25 | – | none listed |
| Independent | Imtiaz Popat | 38 | 0.07 | – | none listed |
| Total valid votes/expense limit | | 55,946 | 99.35 | – | $116,372.00 |
| Total rejected ballots | | 364 | 0.65 | +0.22 | |
| Turnout | | 56,310 | 61.05 | –4.85 | |
| Eligible voters | | 92,243 | | | |
| Liberal hold | | Swing | | –8.81 | |
Source: Elections Canada

2015 Canadian federal election
| Party | Candidate | Votes | % | ±% | Expenditures |
|---|---|---|---|---|---|
| Liberal | Hedy Fry | 32,554 | 56.08 | +25.06 | $126,090.21 |
| New Democratic | Constance Barnes | 11,618 | 20.01 | –6.34 | $102,184.82 |
| Conservative | Elaine Allan | 9,818 | 16.91 | –9.14 | $84,492.99 |
| Green | Lisa Barrett | 3,370 | 5.81 | –9.27 | $45,728.01 |
| Libertarian | John Clarke | 614 | 1.06 | +0.53 | none listed |
| Marxist–Leninist | Michael Hill | 74 | 0.13 | +0.02 | none listed |
| Total valid votes/expense limit | | 58,048 | 99.58 | – | $224,575.59 |
| Total rejected ballots | | 247 | 0.42 | +0.20 | |
| Turnout | | 58,295 | 65.89 | +8.18 | |
| Eligible voters | | 88,470 | | | |
| Liberal hold | | Swing | | +15.70 | |
Source: Elections Canada

2011 federal election redistributed results based on the 2012 Canadian federal electoral redistribution (Note: Indicates what the riding results would have been had the 2011 election taken place using the updated riding boundaries from the 2012 Canadian federal electoral redistribution)
| Party | Vote | % |
|---|---|---|
| Liberal | 12,894 | 31.02 |
| New Democratic | 10,952 | 26.35 |
| Conservative | 10,828 | 26.05 |
| Green | 6,267 | 15.08 |
| Others | 622 | 1.50 |

2011 Canadian federal election
| Party | Candidate | Votes | % | ±% | Expenditures |
|---|---|---|---|---|---|
| Liberal | Hedy Fry | 18,260 | 31.03 | –3.48 | $91,536.75 |
| New Democratic | Karen Margo Shillington | 15,325 | 26.04 | +4.73 | $26,447.50 |
| Conservative | Jennifer Clarke | 15,323 | 26.04 | +0.94 | $65,135.53 |
| Green | Adriane Carr | 9,089 | 15.44 | –2.87 | $99,144.39 |
| Libertarian | John Clarke | 313 | 0.53 | –0.07 | none listed |
| Progressive Canadian | Michael Huenefeld | 285 | 0.48 | – | $666.48 |
| Pirate | Travis McCrea | 192 | 0.33 | – | none listed |
| Marxist–Leninist | Michael Hill | 62 | 0.11 | –0.06 | none listed |
| Total valid votes/expense limit | | 58,849 | 99.77 | – | $100,554.26 |
| Total rejected ballots | | 134 | 0.23 | –0.10 | |
| Turnout | | 58,983 | 57.71 | –1.65 | |
| Eligible voters | | 102,201 | | | |
| Liberal hold | | Swing | | –4.10 | |
Source: Elections Canada

2008 Canadian federal election
| Party | Candidate | Votes | % | ±% | Expenditures |
|---|---|---|---|---|---|
| Liberal | Hedy Fry | 19,506 | 34.51 | –9.30 | $82,559.50 |
| Conservative | Lorne Mayencourt | 14,188 | 25.10 | +4.64 | $90,565.43 |
| New Democratic | Michael Byers | 12,047 | 21.31 | –7.36 | $83,751.31 |
| Green | Adriane Carr | 10,354 | 18.32 | +12.47 | $83,134.82 |
| Libertarian | John Clarke | 340 | 0.60 | +0.07 | none listed |
| Marxist–Leninist | Michael Hill | 94 | 0.17 | – | none listed |
| Total valid votes/expense limit | | 56,529 | 99.67 | – | $94,404.49 |
| Total rejected ballots | | 187 | 0.33 | +0.05 | |
| Turnout | | 56,716 | 59.37 | –2.69 | |
| Eligible voters | | 95,537 | | | |
| Liberal hold | | Swing | | –6.97 | |
Source: Elections Canada

2006 Canadian federal election
| Party | Candidate | Votes | % | ±% | Expenditures |
|---|---|---|---|---|---|
| Liberal | Hedy Fry | 25,013 | 43.80 | +3.49 | $78,549.88 |
| New Democratic | Svend Robinson | 16,374 | 28.67 | –3.62 | $85,910.46 |
| Conservative | Tony Fogarassy | 11,684 | 20.46 | +1.26 | $80,430.10 |
| Green | Jared Evans | 3,340 | 5.85 | –0.93 | $1,008.00 |
| Libertarian | John Clarke | 304 | 0.53 | –0.04 | none listed |
| Marijuana | Heathcliff Dionysus Campbell | 259 | 0.45 | – | $163.15 |
| Christian Heritage | Joe Pal | 130 | 0.23 | –0.23 | $367.31 |
| Total valid votes/expense limit | | 57,104 | 99.72 | – | $86,257.47 |
| Total rejected ballots | | 163 | 0.28 | –0.14 | |
| Turnout | | 57,267 | 62.06 | +0.58 | |
| Eligible voters | | 92,284 | | | |
| Liberal hold | | Swing | | +3.56 | |
Source: Elections Canada

2004 Canadian federal election
| Party | Candidate | Votes | % | ±% | Expenditures |
|---|---|---|---|---|---|
| Liberal | Hedy Fry | 21,280 | 40.31 | –1.99 | $66,619.64 |
| New Democratic | Kennedy Stewart | 17,050 | 32.30 | +20.25 | $55,675.28 |
| Conservative | Gary Mitchell | 10,139 | 19.21 | –18.70 | $73,303.46 |
| Green | Robbie Mattu | 3,580 | 6.78 | +2.84 | $2,444.22 |
| Libertarian | John Clarke | 304 | 0.58 | – | $60.00 |
| Christian Heritage | Joe Pal | 243 | 0.46 | – | $1,877.46 |
| Canadian Action | Alexander Frei | 101 | 0.19 | –1.09 | none listed |
| Communist | Kimball Cariou | 96 | 0.18 | +0.01 | $389.84 |
| Total valid votes/expense limit | | 52,793 | 99.57 | – | $81,169.20 |
| Total rejected ballots | | 226 | 0.43 | –0.05 | |
| Turnout | | 53,019 | 61.47 | +0.97 | |
| Eligible voters | | 86,246 | | | |
| Liberal hold | | Swing | | –11.12 | |
Change for the Conservatives is based on the combined totals of the Canadian Alliance and the Progressive Conservatives.
Source: Elections Canada

2000 Canadian federal election
| Party | Candidate | Votes | % | ±% | Expenditures |
|---|---|---|---|---|---|
| Liberal | Hedy Fry | 24,553 | 42.30 | +1.54 | $69,017 |
| Alliance | John Mortimer | 15,176 | 26.15 | +3.56 | $68,158 |
| New Democratic | Scott Robertson | 6,993 | 12.05 | –8.82 | $8,841 |
| Progressive Conservative | Lee Johnson | 6,828 | 11.76 | +2.52 | $4,047 |
| Green | Jamie Lee Hamilton | 2,285 | 3.94 | +0.93 | $3,945 |
| Marijuana | Marc Emery | 1,116 | 1.92 | – | none listed |
| Canadian Action | Jeff Jewell | 742 | 1.28 | +0.25 | $547 |
| Natural Law | Valerie Laporte | 177 | 0.30 | –0.12 | $40 |
| Communist | Kimball Cariou | 99 | 0.17 | – | $189 |
| Marxist–Leninist | Joseph Theriault | 75 | 0.13 | –0.10 | $364 |
| Total valid votes | | 58,044 | 99.52 | | |
| Total rejected ballots | | 280 | 0.48 | –0.05 | |
| Turnout | | 58,324 | 60.50 | –4.10 | |
| Eligible voters | | 96,399 | | | |
| Liberal hold | | Swing | | –1.01 | |
Change for the Canadian Alliance is based on the Reform Party.
Source: Elections Canada

1997 Canadian federal election
| Party | Candidate | Votes | % | ±% | Expenditures |
|---|---|---|---|---|---|
| Liberal | Hedy Fry | 20,878 | 40.76 | +9.67 | $54,905 |
| Reform | Richard Farbridge | 11,567 | 22.58 | +5.20 | $24,846 |
| New Democratic | Bill Siksay | 10,690 | 20.87 | +5.66 | $27,133 |
| Progressive Conservative | Victoria Minnes | 4,736 | 9.24 | –15.93 | $43,121 |
| Green | Paul Alexander | 1,541 | 3.00 | +2.06 | $2,154 |
| Independent | Joseph Roberts | 728 | 1.42 | – | $6,163 |
| Canadian Action | Connie Fogal | 528 | 1.03 | – | $12,986 |
| Natural Law | John Cowhig | 217 | 0.42 | −0.61 | none listed |
| Independent | John Clarke | 125 | 0.24 | – | $2,687 |
| Marxist–Leninist | Joseph Theriault | 116 | 0.22 | – | $559 |
| Independent | Elvis Flostrand | 92 | 0.17 | – | $699 |
| Total valid votes | | 51,126 | 99.47 | | |
| Total rejected ballots | | 272 | 0.53 | –0.46 | |
| Turnout | | 51,398 | 64.60 | +0.02 | |
| Eligible voters | | 79,563 | | | |
| Liberal hold | | Swing | | +2.22 | |
Source: Elections Canada

1993 Canadian federal election
| Party | Candidate | Votes | % | ±% |
|---|---|---|---|---|
| Liberal | Hedy Fry | 20,095 | 31.09 | +8.28 |
| Progressive Conservative | Kim Campbell | 16,274 | 25.18 | –12.06 |
| Reform | Ian Isbister | 11,235 | 17.38 | +16.00 |
| New Democratic | Betty Baxter | 9,830 | 15.21 | –21.60 |
| National | Thorsten Ewald | 5,144 | 7.96 | – |
| Natural Law | John Cowhig | 670 | 1.04 | – |
| Green | Imtiaz Popat | 616 | 0.95 | +0.14 |
| Christian Heritage | Darren Lowe | 254 | 0.39 | – |
| Libertarian | Tunya Audain | 252 | 0.39 | +0.14 |
| Independent | Brian Godzilla Gnu Salmi | 109 | 0.17 | – |
| Independent | Scott Adams | 99 | 0.15 | –0.04 |
| Commonwealth of Canada | Lucille Boikoff | 27 | 0.04 | – |
| Independent | Peter C. Nuthall | 24 | 0.04 | – |
| Total valid votes | | 64,629 | 99.01 | |
| Total rejected ballots | | 644 | 0.99 | +0.51 |
| Turnout | | 65,249 | 64.73 | –12.89 |
| Eligible voters | | 100,841 | | |
| Liberal gain from Progressive Conservative | | Swing | | +10.17 |
Source: Elections Canada

1988 Canadian federal election
| Party | Candidate | Votes | % | ±% |
|---|---|---|---|---|
| Progressive Conservative | Kim Campbell | 23,620 | 37.24 | –5.99 |
| New Democratic | Johanna Den Hertog | 23,351 | 36.81 | +4.38 |
| Liberal | Tex Enemark | 14,467 | 22.81 | +1.59 |
| Reform | Paula Folkard | 876 | 1.38 | – |
| Green | Murray Gudmundson | 514 | 0.81 | –0.25 |
| Rhinoceros | Bob Nitestalker Colebrook | 262 | 0.41 | –0.56 |
| Libertarian | Duane H. Pye | 156 | 0.25 | –0.38 |
| Independent | Scott Adams | 125 | 0.20 | – |
| Independent | Dorothy-Jean O'Donnell | 58 | 0.09 | – |
| Total valid votes | | 63,429 | 99.52 | |
| Total rejected ballots | | 306 | 0.48 | –0.19 |
| Turnout | | 63,735 | 77.62 | +2.09 |
| Eligible voters | | 82,107 | | |
| Progressive Conservative hold | | Swing | | –5.18 |
Source: Elections Canada

1984 Canadian federal election
| Party | Candidate | Votes | % | ±% |
|---|---|---|---|---|
| Progressive Conservative | Pat Carney | 21,704 | 43.23 | +7.96 |
| New Democratic | Johanna den Hertog | 16,283 | 32.43 | +0.66 |
| Liberal | Paul Manning | 10,654 | 21.22 | –10.20 |
| Green | Paul Watson | 533 | 1.06 | +0.95 |
| Rhinoceros | Danny Tripper Parro | 487 | 0.97 | +0.25 |
| Libertarian | Paul A. Geddes | 316 | 0.63 | – |
| Communist | Maurice Rush | 135 | 0.27 | –0.16 |
| Confederation of Regions | Poldi Meindl | 98 | 0.20 | – |
| Total valid votes | | 50,210 | 99.33 | |
| Total rejected ballots | | 338 | 0.67 | +0.25 |
| Turnout | | 50,548 | 75.54 | +8.91 |
| Eligible voters | | 66,919 | | |
| Progressive Conservative hold | | Swing | | +3.65 |
Source: Elections Canada

1980 Canadian federal election
| Party | Candidate | Votes | % | ±% |
|---|---|---|---|---|
| Progressive Conservative | Pat Carney | 16,462 | 35.27 | +0.84 |
| New Democratic | Ron K. Johnson | 14,830 | 31.77 | +1.80 |
| Liberal | Art Phillips | 14,667 | 31.42 | –3.22 |
| Rhinoceros | David J. Longworth | 337 | 0.72 | – |
| Communist | Jack Phillips | 200 | 0.43 | +0.18 |
| Independent | John Elliot | 101 | 0.22 | –0.38 |
| Independent | Paul Watson | 54 | 0.12 | – |
| Marxist–Leninist | Greg Corcoran | 24 | 0.05 | –0.06 |
| Total valid votes | | 46,675 | 99.58 | |
| Total rejected ballots | | 198 | 0.42 | –0.08 |
| Turnout | | 46,873 | 66.62 | –3.28 |
| Eligible voters | | 70,355 | | |
| Progressive Conservative gain from Liberal | | Swing | | –0.48 |
Source: Elections Canada

1979 Canadian federal election
| Party | Candidate | Votes | % | ±% |
|---|---|---|---|---|
| Liberal | Art Phillips | 15,430 | 34.64 | –7.09 |
| Progressive Conservative | Pat Carney | 15,335 | 34.43 | –3.10 |
| New Democratic | Ron K. Johnson | 13,350 | 29.97 | +10.58 |
| Independent | John Elliot | 267 | 0.60 | – |
| Communist | Bert Ogden | 111 | 0.25 | –0.22 |
| Marxist–Leninist | Greg Corcoran | 48 | 0.11 | –0.20 |
| Total valid votes | | 44,541 | 99.50 | |
| Total rejected ballots | | 223 | 0.50 | –0.05 |
| Turnout | | 44,764 | 69.91 | +1.58 |
| Eligible voters | | 64,034 | | |
| Liberal hold | | Swing | | –2.00 |
Source: Elections Canada

1974 Canadian federal election
| Party | Candidate | Votes | % | ±% |
|---|---|---|---|---|
| Liberal | Ron Basford | 19,064 | 41.74 | +0.39 |
| Progressive Conservative | Doug Davis | 17,143 | 37.53 | +7.27 |
| New Democratic | Ron K. Johnson | 8,859 | 19.39 | –7.26 |
| Social Credit | Walter Muller | 257 | 0.56 | –0.79 |
| Communist | Betty Greenwell | 213 | 0.47 | – |
| Marxist–Leninist | Charles Shrybman | 141 | 0.31 | – |
| Total valid votes | | 45,677 | 99.45 | |
| Total rejected ballots | | 252 | 0.55 | –1.71 |
| Turnout | | 45,929 | 68.32 | –1.29 |
| Eligible voters | | 67,222 | | |
| Liberal hold | | Swing | | −3.44 |
Source: Library of Parliament

1972 Canadian federal election
| Party | Candidate | Votes | % | ±% |
|---|---|---|---|---|
| Liberal | Ron Basford | 19,341 | 41.35 | –14.75 |
| Progressive Conservative | John McDonald | 14,156 | 30.26 | +11.89 |
| New Democratic | Ron K. Johnson | 12,470 | 26.66 | +2.05 |
| Social Credit | Nicholas Zambus | 632 | 1.35 | – |
| Independent | Arnold August | 77 | 0.16 | – |
| Independent | Ray Dodge | 55 | 0.12 | – |
| Independent | Daniel Ivan Fedoruk | 46 | 0.10 | – |
| Total valid votes | | 46,777 | 97.74 | |
| Total rejected ballots | | 1,081 | 2.26 | +1.50 |
| Turnout | | 47,858 | 69.61 | –1.20 |
| Eligible voters | | 68,748 | | |
| Liberal hold | | Swing | | −13.32 |
Source: Library of Parliament

1968 Canadian federal election
| Party | Candidate | Votes | % | ±% |
|---|---|---|---|---|
| Liberal | Ron Basford | 25,426 | 56.10 | +16.02 |
| New Democratic | William H. Deverell | 11,151 | 24.60 | +1.54 |
| Progressive Conservative | David Kilgour | 8,326 | 18.37 | –9.43 |
| Republican | Gerard Goeujon | 420 | 0.93 | – |
| Total valid votes | | 45,323 | 99.24 | |
| Total rejected ballots | | 348 | 0.76 | –0.64 |
| Turnout | | 45,671 | 70.81 | +4.96 |
| Eligible voters | | 64,498 | | |
| Liberal hold | | Swing | | +7.24 |
Source: Library of Parliament

1965 Canadian federal election
| Party | Candidate | Votes | % | ±% |
|---|---|---|---|---|
| Liberal | John Robert Nicholson | 9,008 | 40.08 | +0.75 |
| Progressive Conservative | Douglas Jung | 6,248 | 27.80 | –2.73 |
| New Democratic | Lyle Kristiansen | 5,184 | 23.07 | –1.13 |
| Social Credit | William John McIntyre | 1,806 | 8.04 | +2.10 |
| Independent Social Credit | James B. Wisbey | 228 | 1.01 | – |
| Total valid votes | | 22,474 | 98.60 | |
| Total rejected ballots | | 319 | 1.40 | +0.26 |
| Turnout | | 22,793 | 65.85 | –4.67 |
| Eligible voters | | 34,615 | | |
| Liberal hold | | Swing | | +1.74 |
Source: Library of Parliament

1963 Canadian federal election
| Party | Candidate | Votes | % | ±% |
|---|---|---|---|---|
| Liberal | John Robert Nicholson | 9,472 | 39.33 | +3.73 |
| Progressive Conservative | Douglas Jung | 7,353 | 30.53 | –0.94 |
| New Democratic | Margaret Erickson | 5,826 | 24.19 | +0.54 |
| Social Credit | Bevis Walters | 1,430 | 5.94 | –2.29 |
| Total valid votes | | 24,081 | 98.86 | |
| Total rejected ballots | | 278 | 1.14 | –0.21 |
| Turnout | | 24,359 | 70.52 | +1.81 |
| Eligible voters | | 34,541 | | |
| Liberal hold | | Swing | | +2.34 |
Source: Library of Parliament

1962 Canadian federal election
| Party | Candidate | Votes | % | ±% |
|---|---|---|---|---|
| Liberal | John Robert Nicholson | 7,697 | 35.61 | +18.43 |
| Progressive Conservative | Douglas Jung | 6,803 | 31.47 | –29.95 |
| New Democratic | Margaret Erickson | 5,113 | 23.65 | +9.73 |
| Social Credit | George Hahn | 1,779 | 8.23 | +3.60 |
| Independent | Burton V. White | 224 | 1.04 | – |
| Total valid votes | | 21,616 | 98.65 | |
| Total rejected ballots | | 295 | 1.35 | +0.05 |
| Turnout | | 21,911 | 68.71 | +3.99 |
| Eligible voters | | 31,890 | | |
| Liberal gain from Progressive Conservative | | Swing | | +24.19 |
Change for the New Democrats is based on the Co-operative Commonwealth.
Source: Library of Parliament

1958 Canadian federal election
| Party | Candidate | Votes | % | ±% |
|---|---|---|---|---|
| Progressive Conservative | Douglas Jung | 14,044 | 61.43 | +19.92 |
| Liberal | Lyon Ward | 3,927 | 17.18 | –7.29 |
| Co-operative Commonwealth | Alan Judge | 3,183 | 13.92 | +3.80 |
| Social Credit | Cyril White | 1,059 | 4.63 | –16.87 |
| Labor–Progressive | Maurice Rush | 650 | 2.84 | +0.43 |
| Total valid votes | | 22,863 | 98.70 | |
| Total rejected ballots | | 300 | 1.30 | +0.10 |
| Turnout | | 23,163 | 64.72 | –0.66 |
| Eligible voters | | 35,792 | | |
| Progressive Conservative hold | | Swing | | +13.60 |
Source: Library of Parliament

1957 Canadian federal election
| Party | Candidate | Votes | % | ±% |
|---|---|---|---|---|
| Progressive Conservative | Douglas Jung | 9,087 | 41.50 | +32.86 |
| Liberal | Ralph Campney | 5,357 | 24.47 | –16.37 |
| Social Credit | Cyril White | 4,707 | 21.50 | –2.96 |
| Co-operative Commonwealth | William James Dennison | 2,216 | 10.12 | –12.21 |
| Labor–Progressive | Maurice Rush | 528 | 2.41 | –1.33 |
| Total valid votes | | 21,895 | 98.81 | |
| Total rejected ballots | | 264 | 1.19 | +0.24 |
| Turnout | | 22,159 | 65.37 | +7.46 |
| Eligible voters | | 33,896 | | |
| Progressive Conservative gain from Liberal | | Swing | | +24.62 |
Source: Library of Parliament

1953 Canadian federal election
| Party | Candidate | Votes | % | ±% |
|---|---|---|---|---|
| Liberal | Ralph Campney | 8,259 | 40.83 | –1.73 |
| Social Credit | Leslie Peterson | 4,946 | 24.45 | – |
| Co-operative Commonwealth | Rodney Young | 4,516 | 22.33 | –4.05 |
| Progressive Conservative | Wendell Willard Wright | 1,749 | 8.65 | –16.02 |
| Labor–Progressive | Ernest Lawrie | 756 | 3.74 | –0.20 |
| Total valid votes | | 20,226 | 99.05 | |
| Total rejected ballots | | 195 | 0.95 | –0.31 |
| Turnout | | 20,421 | 57.91 | –4.61 |
| Eligible voters | | 35,263 | | |
| Liberal hold | | Swing | | −13.09 |
Source: Library of Parliament

1949 Canadian federal election
| Party | Candidate | Votes | % | ±% |
|---|---|---|---|---|
| Liberal | Ralph Campney | 10,299 | 42.56 | +8.90 |
| Co-operative Commonwealth | Rodney Young | 6,382 | 26.37 | –17.22 |
| Progressive Conservative | Henry Herbert Stevens | 5,970 | 24.67 | +1.93 |
| Labor–Progressive | Maurice Rush | 952 | 3.93 | – |
| Independent | Harold Meade Young | 595 | 2.46 | – |
| Total valid votes | | 24,198 | 98.73 | |
| Total rejected ballots | | 311 | 1.27 | +1.27 |
| Turnout | | 24,509 | 62.52 | – |
| Eligible voters | | 39,201 | | |
| Liberal gain from Co-operative Commonwealth | | Swing | | +13.06 |
Source: Library of Parliament

Canadian federal by-election, June 8, 1948 On Ian Mackenzie being called to the Senate, January 19, 1948
| Party | Candidate | Votes | % | ±% |
|---|---|---|---|---|
| Co-operative Commonwealth | Rodney Young | 9,518 | 43.60 | +16.27 |
| Liberal | Ralph Campney | 7,348 | 33.66 | +3.90 |
| Progressive Conservative | Hilliard Lyle Jestley | 4,965 | 22.74 | –3.73 |
| Total valid votes | | 21,831 | 100.00 | |
| Total rejected ballots | | – | | |
| Turnout | | 21,831 | – | |
| Eligible voters | | – | | |
| Co-operative Commonwealth gain from Liberal | | Swing | | +6.18 |
Source: Library of Parliament

1945 Canadian federal election
| Party | Candidate | Votes | % | ±% |
|---|---|---|---|---|
| Liberal | Ian Alistair Mackenzie | 9,959 | 29.76 | –9.40 |
| Co-operative Commonwealth | George Alfred Isherwood | 9,145 | 27.33 | +0.06 |
| Progressive Conservative | Ernest Garfield Sherwood | 8,859 | 26.47 | –3.75 |
| Labor–Progressive | James Swanson Thompson | 3,750 | 11.21 | – |
| Social Credit | Eric Martin | 1,042 | 3.11 | – |
| Democratic | William Richard Nathaniel Smith | 393 | 1.17 | – |
| Socialist Labor | Robert Gordon McQuillan | 319 | 0.95 | – |
| Total valid votes | | 33,467 | 98.22 | |
| Total rejected ballots | | 607 | 1.78 | –0.88 |
| Turnout | | 34,074 | 72.64 | +0.30 |
| Eligible voters | | 46,908 | | |
| Liberal hold | | Swing | | –4.72 |
Source: Library of Parliament

1940 Canadian federal election
| Party | Candidate | Votes | % | ±% |
|---|---|---|---|---|
| Liberal | Ian Alistair Mackenzie | 12,100 | 39.15 | +5.10 |
| National Government | Ernest Garfield Sherwood | 9,338 | 30.22 | +7.15 |
| Co-operative Commonwealth | Wallis Walter LeFeaux | 8,427 | 27.27 | –6.18 |
| Independent | Paul McDowell Kerr | 630 | 2.04 | – |
| Independent Nationalist | Norman Lee Glozier | 408 | 1.32 | – |
| Total valid votes | | 30,903 | 97.34 | |
| Total rejected ballots | | 845 | 2.66 | +1.35 |
| Turnout | | 31,748 | 72.34 | +2.06 |
| Eligible voters | | 43,887 | | |
| Liberal hold | | Swing | | −1.03 |
Source: Library of Parliament

1935 Canadian federal election
| Party | Candidate | Votes | % | ±% |
|---|---|---|---|---|
| Liberal | Ian Alistair Mackenzie | 7,658 | 34.05 | –20.57 |
| Co-operative Commonwealth | Wallis Walter LeFeaux | 7,522 | 33.45 | – |
| Conservative | Ernest Garfield Sherwood | 5,187 | 23.06 | –22.32 |
| Reconstruction | Lilette Julia Caroline Mahon | 1,872 | 8.32 | – |
| Socialist | John David Taylor | 251 | 1.12 | – |
| Total valid votes | | 22,490 | 98.69 | |
| Total rejected ballots | | 299 | 1.31 | +1.31 |
| Turnout | | 22,789 | 70.28 | +4.31 |
| Eligible voters | | 32,428 | | |
| Liberal hold | | Swing | | –27.01 |
Source: Library of Parliament

1930 Canadian federal election
| Party | Candidate | Votes | % | ±% |
|---|---|---|---|---|
| Liberal | Ian Alistair Mackenzie | 12,064 | 54.62 | +10.78 |
| Conservative | Henry Herbert Stevens | 10,023 | 45.38 | –8.06 |
| Total valid votes | | 22,087 | 100.00 | |
| Total rejected ballots | | – | | |
| Turnout | | 22,087 | 65.96 | +1.29 |
| Eligible voters | | 33,483 | | |
| Liberal gain from Conservative | | Swing | | +9.42 |
Source: Library of Parliament

1926 Canadian federal election
| Party | Candidate | Votes | % | ±% |
|---|---|---|---|---|
| Conservative | Henry Herbert Stevens | 10,326 | 53.44 | +4.96 |
| Liberal | Dugald Donaghy | 8,471 | 43.84 | +1.42 |
| Labour | Eugene Thorton Kingsley | 527 | 2.73 | –6.38 |
| Total valid votes | | 19,324 | 100.00 | |
| Total rejected ballots | | – | | |
| Turnout | | 19,324 | 64.68 | –5.75 |
| Eligible voters | | 29,878 | | |
| Conservative hold | | Swing | | +1.77 |
Source: Library of Parliament

1925 Canadian federal election
| Party | Candidate | Votes | % | ±% |
|---|---|---|---|---|
| Conservative | Henry Herbert Stevens | 9,458 | 48.47 | –10.03 |
| Liberal | Gerald Grattan McGeer | 8,277 | 42.42 | +11.54 |
| Labour | Wallis Walter LeFeaux | 1,777 | 9.11 | – |
| Total valid votes | | 19,512 | 100.00 | |
| Total rejected ballots | | – | | |
| Turnout | | 19,512 | 70.42 | +13.37 |
| Eligible voters | | 27,707 | | |
| Conservative hold | | Swing | | –10.78 |
Source: Library of Parliament

1921 Canadian federal election
| Party | Candidate | Votes | % | ±% |
|---|---|---|---|---|
| Conservative | Henry Herbert Stevens | 10,493 | 58.50 | –9.24 |
| Liberal | Robert Henry Otley Gale | 5,538 | 30.88 | +3.51 |
| Independent | Thomas O'Connor | 1,866 | 10.40 | – |
| Progressive | Cadwallader Flagg Batson | 39 | 0.22 | – |
| Total valid votes | | 17,936 | 100.00 | |
| Total rejected ballots | | – | | |
| Turnout | | 17,936 | 57.06 | –60.89 |
| Eligible voters | | 31,436 | | |
| Conservative hold | | Swing | | −6.38 |
Source: Library of Parliament

1917 Canadian federal election
| Party | Candidate | Votes | % |
|---|---|---|---|
| Government (Unionist) | Henry Herbert Stevens | 13,722 | 67.74 |
| Opposition (Laurier Liberals) | William Wallace Burns McInnes | 5,543 | 27.36 |
| Labour | William Arthur Pritchard | 992 | 4.90 |
| Total valid votes | | 20,257 | 100.00 |
| Total rejected ballots | | – | |
| Turnout | | 20,257 | 117.94 |
| Eligible voters | | 17,175 | |
This riding was created from parts of Vancouver City, where Conservative Henry Herbert Stevens was the incumbent.
Source: Library of Parliament

== Student vote results ==
=== 2019 ===
2019 Canadian federal election
| Party | Candidate | Votes | % |
|---|---|---|---|
| New Democratic | Breen Ouellette | 376 | 37.41 |
| Green | Jesse Brown | 242 | 24.08 |
| Liberal | Hedy Fry | 194 | 19.30 |
| Conservative | David Cavey | 108 | 10.75 |
| Libertarian | John Clarke | 33 | 3.28 |
| Independent | Lily Bowman | 31 | 3.08 |
| People's | Louise Kierans | 21 | 2.09 |
| Independent | Imtiaz Popat | 0 | 0.0 |
| Total valid votes/expense limit | | 1,005 | 100.0 |
Source: Student Vote Canada

== See also ==
- List of Canadian electoral districts
- Historical federal electoral districts of Canada

== Notes ==
Parliament of Canada
| Preceded by Charlevoix | Constituency represented by the prime minister 1993 | Succeeded by Saint-Maurice |
