= Rodney Young (politician) =

Canadian politician and lawyer (1910-1978)

Member of the Canadian Parliament for Vancouver Centre
- In office 1948–1949
- Preceded by: Ian Alistair Mackenzie
- Succeeded by: Ralph Campney

Personal details
- Born: March 21, 1910 Liverpool, England
- Died: April 13, 1978 (aged 68)
- Party: CCF

Rodney Young (March 21, 1910 − April 13, 1978) was a lawyer and Canadian Member of Parliament.

Young was born in Liverpool and emigrated to Canada in 1926 at the age of 16 settling in Vancouver. He was a socialist activist during the Great Depression and did political work in the unemployment relief camps that were set up during the Great Depression in Canada.

Young was a member of the Socialist Party of Canada's British Columbia section and was one of the party's two candidates in the dual member constituency of Vancouver Centre for the 1933 provincial election garnering 64 votes.

In 1934, the Socialist Party in BC joined the fledgling Co-operative Commonwealth Federation and Young joined the youth wing of the fledgling democratic socialist political party.

He joined the Royal Canadian Corps of Signals during World War II, serving in the Canadian Army from 1940 until 1946.

Following demobilization, he enrolled in the University of British Columbia's law school. While still a law student in 1948, he contested a by-election in Vancouver Centre on behalf of the CCF and was elected to the House of Commons of Canada. He only served for a year before being defeated in his attempt to retain his seat in the 1949 federal election. His attempt to regain the seat in the 1953 resulted in a third-place finish.

Young was a socialist and on the left wing of the CCF. His involvement with Marxist activists resulted in his expulsion from the British Columbia wing of the CCF by the party's executive in 1954 in what was called the "Rod Young Affair".

== Electoral record ==
1953 Canadian federal election: Vancouver Centre
Party	Candidate	Votes	%	±%
Liberal	Ralph Campney	8,259	40.83	–1.73
Social Credit	Leslie Peterson	4,946	24.45	–
Co-operative Commonwealth	Rodney Young	4,516	22.33	–4.05
Progressive Conservative	Wendell Willard Wright	1,749	8.65	–16.02
Labor–Progressive	Ernest Lawrie	756	3.74	–0.20
Total valid votes		20,226	99.05	
Total rejected ballots		195	0.95	–0.31
Turnout		20,421	57.91	–4.61
Eligible voters		35,263		
Liberal hold		Swing		−13.09
Source: Library of Parliament

1949 Canadian federal election: Vancouver Centre
Party	Candidate	Votes	%	±%
Liberal	Ralph Campney	10,299	42.56	+8.90
Co-operative Commonwealth	Rodney Young	6,382	26.37	–17.22
Progressive Conservative	Henry Herbert Stevens	5,970	24.67	+1.93
Labor–Progressive	Maurice Rush	952	3.93	–
Independent	Harold Meade Young	595	2.46	–
Total valid votes		24,198	98.73	
Total rejected ballots		311	1.27	+1.27
Turnout		24,509	62.52	–
Eligible voters		39,201		
Liberal gain from Co-operative Commonwealth		Swing		+13.06
Source: Library of Parliament

Canadian federal by-election, 8 June 1948 On Ian Mackenzie being called to the Senate, 19 January 1948
Party	Candidate	Votes	%	±%
Co-operative Commonwealth	Rodney Young	9,518	43.60	+16.27
Liberal	Ralph Campney	7,348	33.66	+3.90
Progressive Conservative	Hilliard Lyle Jestley	4,965	22.74	-3.73
Total valid votes		21,831	100.0	
Co-operative Commonwealth gain from Liberal		Swing		+6.18
