= Ian Alistair Mackenzie =

Canadian politician (1890–1949)

The Right Honourable Ian Alistair Mackenzie PC
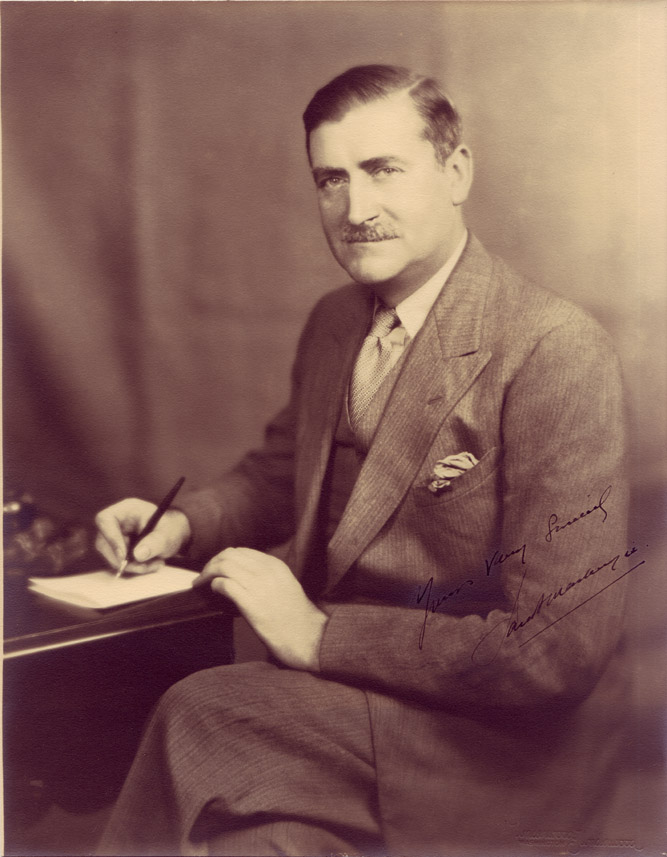

Member of the Legislative Assembly of British Columbia for Vancouver
- In office 1920–1928

Member of the Legislative Assembly of British Columbia for North Vancouver
- In office 1928–1930

Member of Parliament for Vancouver Centre
- In office 1930–1948
- Preceded by: Henry Herbert Stevens
- Succeeded by: Rodney Young

Canadian Senator from British Columbia
- In office 1948–1949
- Appointed by: William Lyon Mackenzie King

Personal details
- Born: July 27, 1890 Assynt, Scotland
- Died: September 2, 1949 (aged 59)
- Party: Liberal

Ian Alistair Mackenzie PC (Can) PC (July 27, 1890 – September 2, 1949) was a Canadian parliamentarian.

== Background ==
Born in Assynt, Scotland, Mackenzie entered politics by winning a seat in the Legislative Assembly of British Columbia (BC) in the 1920 BC election. He served as Provincial Secretary of British Columbia from June 5, 1928, to August 20, 1928. In 1930, he was appointed to Prime Minister William Lyon Mackenzie King's pre-election Cabinet as Minister of Immigration and Colonization and Superintendent of Indian Affairs. While he won his seat in the 1930 federal election the Liberal Party was defeated across the country. Mackenzie entered Parliament as an Opposition Member of Parliament (MP).

When the Liberals returned to power through the 1935 election, Mackenzie returned to Cabinet as Minister of National Defence, where he had the responsibility for pre-war rearmament. With the outbreak of World War II in 1939, however, Mackenzie was moved to the position of Minister of Pensions and National Health, in part because of his role in a scandal involving the awarding of a contract to manufacture the Bren light machine gun. In 1944, he became Minister of Veterans Affairs.

Mackenzie was an able parliamentarian, and when the increasing pressures of war led Prime Minister King to decide to delegate some of his responsibilities in the House of Commons to the new position of Government House Leader, he chose Mackenzie as the first MP to hold that responsibility.

During the war, Mackenzie pandered to anti-Japanese sentiment in British Columbia by declaring to his constituents at his 1944 nomination meeting "Let our slogan be for British Columbia: 'No Japs from the Rockies to the seas.'" As British Columbia's senior cabinet minister Mackenzie had a key role in the government's decision to intern Japanese-Canadians for the duration of the war.

In 1947, Mackenzie was named to the Imperial Privy Council along with several other senior Canadian cabinet ministers, allowing him to use the honorific of "Right Honourable". In 1948, he was appointed to the Senate of Canada. He served only a year and a half until his death in 1949.

== Archives ==
There is an Ian MacKenzie fonds at Library and Archives Canada.

Political offices
| Preceded by None | Leader of the Government in the House of Commons; 1944–1948 | Succeeded by Alphonse Fournier |
