= Electoral history of Jean Charest =

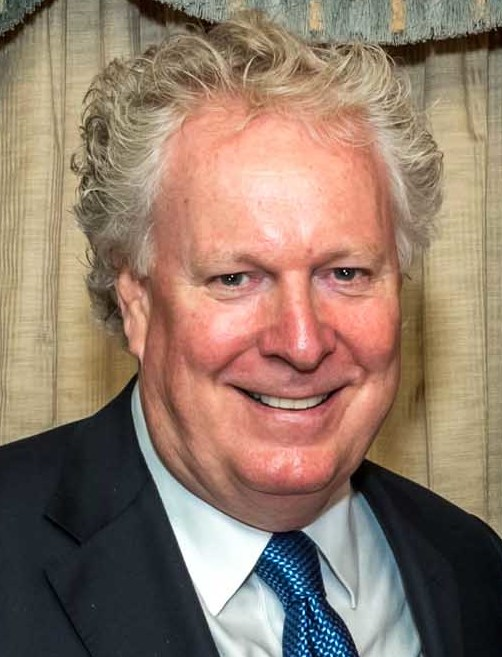
Charest in 2017

Jean Charest is a former Canadian politician that served in various elected offices in both the federal government of Canada and the provincial government of Quebec. Starting his career in federal politics, Charest sought public office for the first time in the 1984 Canadian federal election as a candidate for the Progressive Conservative Party of Canada. After 15 years in federal politics, which included a period as leader of the federal Progressive Conservatives from 1993 to 1998, Charest entered provincial politics and became the leader of the Quebec Liberal Party in 1998. He would then serve as the premier of Quebec from 2003 to 2012.

Throughout his career, Charest has run in 9 constituency level elections, led a political party in 6 general election campaigns, and sought the leadership of a political party on 4 occasions.

== Overview ==
Electoral history of Jean Charest — Legislative general elections
Year	Type	Party	Votes			Seats		Position
Year	Type	Party	Total	%	±%	Total	±	Position
1997	Federal	Progressive Conservative	2,446,705	18.84%	+2.80	20 / 301	+18	Fifth party
1998	Provincial	Liberal	1,771,858	43.55%	-0.85	48 / 125	+1	Official Opposition
2003	Provincial	Liberal	1,755,863	45.99%	+2.44	76 / 125	+28	Majority
2007	Provincial	Liberal	1,313,664	33.08%	-12.91	48 / 125	-28	Minority
2008	Provincial	Liberal	1,366,046	42.08%	+9.00	66 / 125	+18	Majority
2012	Provincial	Liberal	1,360,968	31.20%	-10.88	50 / 125	-16	Official Opposition

Electoral history of Jean Charest — Constituency elections
Year	Type	Riding	Party	Votes for Charest				Result	Swing
Year	Type	Riding	Party	Total	%	P.	±%	Result	Swing
1984	Federal	Sherbrooke	Progressive Conservative	22,232	51.5%	1st	+42.2	Elected	Gain
1988	Federal	Sherbrooke	Progressive Conservative	34,538	63.3%	1st	+11.8	Elected	Hold
1993	Federal	Sherbrooke	Progressive Conservative	29,740	52.3%	1st	-11.0	Elected	Hold
1997	Federal	Sherbrooke	Progressive Conservative	32,228	59.5%	1st	+7.2	Elected	Hold
1998	Provincial	Sherbrooke	Liberal	15,093	47.41%	1st	+4.6	Elected	Gain
2003	Provincial	Sherbrooke	Liberal	16,403	46.95%	1st	-0.5	Elected	Hold
2007	Provincial	Sherbrooke	Liberal	13,136	36.56%	1st	-10.4	Elected	Hold
2008	Provincial	Sherbrooke	Liberal	13,694	45.24%	1st	+8.7	Elected	Hold
2012	Provincial	Sherbrooke	Liberal	113,267	35.13%	2nd	-10.1	Lost	Gain

Electoral history of Jean Charest — Political party leadership elections
Year	Party	Votes	%	Pts	%	P.	Result
1993	Progressive Conservative Party of Canada	1,369 (1st); 1,630 (2nd)	39.5% (1st); 47.3% (2nd)	Point system not used		2nd	Lost
1995	Progressive Conservative Party of Canada	1,187	96.04%	Point system not used		1st	Won
1998	Quebec Liberal Party	Acclaimed		Point system not used		1st	Won
2022	Conservative Party of Canada	48,650	11.65%	5,421.62	16.07%	2nd	Lost

== General elections ==
=== Federal election, 1997 ===
Canadian federal election, 1997 – Results summary
Party	Leaders	Seats Won	Popular Vote
Liberal	Jean Chrétien^{1}	155	38.5%
Reform	Preston Manning^{2}	60	19.4%
Bloc Québécois	Gilles Duceppe^{3}	44	10.7%
New Democratic	Alexa McDonough	21	11.1%
Progressive Conservative	Jean Charest	20	18.8%
Independent	–	1	0.5%
Total		301	99.0%^{4}
Sources: Library of Parliament

^{1} Prime Minister when election was called; Prime Minister after election.
^{2} Leader of a third party when election was called; Leader of the Opposition after the election.
^{3} Leader of the Opposition when election was called; leader of a third party after the election.
^{4} Table does not include parties which received votes but did not elect any members.

=== Quebec general election, 1998 ===
Quebec general election, 1998 – Results summary
Party	Leaders	Seats Won	Popular Vote
Parti Québécois	Lucien Bouchard^{1}	76	42.87%
Liberal	Jean Charest^{2}	48	43.55%
Action démocratique	Mario Dumont	1	11.81%
Total		125	98.23%^{3}

^{1} Premier when election was called; Premier after election.
^{2} Leader of the Opposition when election was called; Leader of the Opposition after election.
^{3} Table does not include parties which received votes but did not elect any members.

=== Quebec general election, 2003 ===
Quebec general election, 2003 – Results summary
Party	Leaders	Seats Won	Popular Vote
Liberal	Jean Charest^{1}	76	45.99%
Parti Québécois	Bernard Landry^{2}	45	33.24%
Action démocratique	Mario Dumont	4	18.18%
Total		125	97.41%^{3}

^{1} Leader of the Opposition when election was called; Premier after election.
^{2} Premier when election was called; Leader of the Opposition after election.
^{3} Table does not include parties which received votes but did not elect any members.

=== Quebec general election, 2007 ===
Quebec general election, 2007 – Results summary
Party	Leaders	Seats Won	Popular Vote
Liberal	Jean Charest^{1}	48	33.08%
Action démocratique	Mario Dumont^{2}	41	30.84%
Parti Québécois	André Boisclair^{3}	36	28.35%
Total		125	92.27%^{4}

^{1} Premier when election was called; Premier after election.
^{2} Third party leader when election was called; Leader of the Opposition after election.
^{3} Leader of the Opposition when election was called; Third party leader after election.
^{4} Table does not include parties which received votes but did not elect any members.

=== Quebec general election, 2008 ===
Quebec general election, 2008 – Results summary
Party	Leaders	Seats Won	Popular Vote
Liberal	Jean Charest^{1}	66	42.08%
Parti Québécois	Pauline Marois^{2}	51	35.17%
Action démocratique	Mario Dumont^{3}	7	16.37%
Québec solidaire	Françoise David; Amir Khadir	1	3.78%
Total		125	97.40%^{4}

^{1} Premier when election was called; Premier after election.
^{2} Third party leader when election was called; Leader of the Opposition after election.
^{3} Leader of the Opposition when election was called; Third party leader after election.
^{4} Table does not include parties which received votes but did not elect any members.

=== Quebec general election, 2012 ===
Quebec general election, 2012 – Results summary
Party	Leaders	Seats Won	Popular Vote
Parti Québécois	Pauline Marois^{1}	54	31.95%
Liberal	Jean Charest^{2}	50	31.20%
Coalition Avenir Québec	François Legault	19	27.05%
Québec solidaire	Françoise David; Amir Khadir	2	6.03%
Total		125	96.23%^{3}

^{1} Leader of the Opposition when election was called; Premier after election.
^{2} Premier when election was called; Leader of the Opposition after election.
^{3} Table does not include parties which received votes but did not elect any members.

== Constituency elections ==
=== Federal election, 1984: Sherbrooke ===
1984 Canadian federal election: Sherbrooke
Party	Candidate	Votes	%	±%
Progressive Conservative	Jean Charest	22,232	51.5%	+42.2%
Liberal	Irénée Pelletier	14,607	33.8%	-38.0%
New Democratic	Daniel Berthold	4,230	9.8%	-0.2%
Rhinoceros	Gilbert Peupa Ash	1,054	2.4%	-1.3%
Parti nationaliste	Lorraine Déry	687	1.6%	
Social Credit	Fernand Bourret	197	0.5%	-3.7%
Communist	Yves Lawler	92	0.2%	–
Commonwealth of Canada	Françoise Chanteau	72	0.2%	
Total valid votes		43,171	100.0%	

=== Federal election, 1988: Sherbrooke ===
1988 Canadian federal election: Sherbrooke
Party	Candidate	Votes	%	±%
Progressive Conservative	Jean Charest	34,538	63.3%	+11.8%
Liberal	Dennis Wood	12,314	22.6%	-11.2%
New Democratic	Alain Poirier	6,373	11.7%	+1.9%
Rhinoceros	Bébé Sept Heures Pierre Granger	1,040	1.9%	-0.5%
Independent	Normand Guy	148	0.3%	
Communist	Yves Lawler	143	0.3%	+0.1%
Total valid votes		54,556	100.0%	

=== Federal election, 1993: Sherbrooke ===
1993 Canadian federal election: Sherbrooke
Party	Candidate	Votes	%	±%
Progressive Conservative	Jean Charest	29,740	52.3%	−11.0%
Bloc Québécois	Guy Boutin	21,559	37.9%	
Liberal	Jean Paul Pelletier	4,462	7.9%	-14.7%
Natural Law	Serge Trépanier	516	0.9%	
New Democratic	Martine Caouette	445	0.8%	−10.9%
Abolitionist	Jean-Guy Trépanier	91	0.2%	
Total valid votes		56,813	100.0%	
Progressive Conservative hold		Swing		–

=== Federal election, 1997: Sherbrooke ===
1997 Canadian federal election: Sherbrooke
Party	Candidate	Votes	%	±%
Progressive Conservative	Jean Charest	32,228	59.5%	+7.2%
Bloc Québécois	Jacques Blanchette	16,086	29.7%	-8.2%
Liberal	Martin Bureau	4,720	8.7%	+0.8%
New Democratic	Tom Vouloumanos	628	1.2%	+0.4%
Natural Law	Christian Simard	477	0.9%	0.0%
Total valid votes		54,139	100.0%	–
Progressive Conservative hold		Swing		+7.7

=== Quebec general election, 1998: Sherbrooke ===
1998 Quebec general election: Sherbrooke
Party	Candidate	Votes	%	±%
Liberal	Jean Charest	15,093	47.41	+4.56
Parti Québécois	Marie Malavoy	14,186	44.56	-2.75
Action démocratique	Patrick C. Rouillard	2,171	6.82	-1.41
Independent	Normand Gilbert	169	0.53	–
Bloc Pot	Christian Meunier	166	0.52	–
Natural Law	Christian Simard	53	0.17	-0.88
Total valid votes		31,838	–	–
Liberal gain from Parti Québécois		Swing		+3.66

=== Quebec general election, 2003: Sherbrooke ===
2003 Quebec general election: Sherbrooke
Party	Candidate	Votes	%	±%
Liberal	Jean Charest	16,403	46.95	-0.46
Parti Québécois	Marie Malavoy	13,806	39.52	-5.04
Action démocratique	Peter Downey	4,169	11.93	+5.11
UFP	Normand Gilbert	496	1.42	+0.89
People's Front	Serge Lachapelle	64	0.18	–
Total valid votes		34,938	–	–
Liberal hold		Swing		+2.29

=== Quebec general election, 2007: Sherbrooke ===
2007 Quebec general election: Sherbrooke
Party	Candidate	Votes	%	±%
Liberal	Jean Charest	13,136	36.56	-10.39
Parti Québécois	Claude Forgues	11,804	32.85	-6.67
Action démocratique	Michel Dumont	6,409	17.84	+5.91
Québec solidaire	Christian Bibeau	2,263	6.30	+4.88*
Green	Steve Dubois	2,203	6.13	–
Independent	Hubert Richard	115	0.32	–
Total valid votes		35,930	99.13	–
Total rejected ballots		316	8.87	–
Turnout		36,246	74.23	+0.74
Electors on the lists		48,831	–	–
Liberal hold		Swing		-1.86

=== Quebec general election, 2008: Sherbrooke ===
2008 Quebec general election: Sherbrooke
Party	Candidate	Votes	%	±%
Liberal	Jean Charest	13,694	45.24	+8.68
Parti Québécois	Laurent-Paul Maheux	11,380	37.59	+4.74
Action démocratique	Jacques Joly	2,074	6.85	-10.99
Québec solidaire	Christian Bibeau	1,948	6.44	+0.14
Green	Steve Dubois	1,016	3.36	-2.77
Independent	Hubert Richard	158	0.52	+0.20
Total valid votes		30,270	98.68	–
Total rejected ballots		405	1.32	–
Turnout		30,675	62.61	-11.62
Electors on the lists		48,995	–	–
Liberal hold		Swing		+1.97

=== Quebec general election, 2012: Sherbrooke ===
2012 Quebec general election: Sherbrooke
Party	Candidate	Votes	%	±%
Parti Québécois	Serge Cardin	15,909	42.12	+4.53
Liberal	Jean Charest	13,267	35.13	-10.11
Coalition Avenir Québec	Philippe Girard	4,457	11.80	+4.95*
Québec solidaire	Christian Bibeau	2,586	6.85	+0.41
Option nationale	Évelyne Beaudin	1,069	2.83	–
Green	Suzanne Richer	407	1.08	-2.28
Parti indépendantiste	Christian Clavet	73	0.19	–
Total valid votes		37,768	99.10	–
Total rejected ballots		344	0.90	–
Turnout		38,112	78.10	+15.49
Electors on the lists		48,799	–	–
Parti Québécois gain from Liberal		Swing		+7.32
* Result compared to Action démocratique

== Party leadership elections ==
=== Progressive Conservative Party of Canada leadership election, 1993 ===
Delegate support by ballot
Candidate	1st ballot		2nd ballot	
Candidate	Votes cast	%	Votes cast	%
Kim Campbell	1,664	48.0%	1,817	52.7%
Jean Charest	1,369	39.5%	1,630	47.3%
Jim Edwards	307	8.8%	Endorsed Campbell	
Garth Turner	76	2.2%	Withdrew; Did not endorse	
Patrick Boyer	53	1.5%	Endorsed Charest	
Total	3,469	100.0%	3,447	100.0%

First round
Campbell	47.97%
Charest	39.46%
Edwards	8.85%
Turner	2.19%
Boyer	1.53%

Final round
Campbell	52.71%
Charest	47.29%

=== Progressive Conservative Party of Canada leadership election, 1995 ===
Following the resignation of Kim Campbell, Jean Charest was appointed as the interim leader of the Progressive Conservative Party on December 14, 1993. On April 29, 1995, a vote was held to confirm Charest as the permanent party leader.

Vote to ratify Jean Charest as leader
Candidate	Yes		No	
Candidate	Delegate Count	%	Delegate Count	%
Jean Charest	1,187	96.04%	49	3.96%
Total	1,236			

=== Quebec Liberal leadership election, 1998 ===
Jean Charest was acclaimed as leader of the Quebec Liberal Party on April 30, 1998.

=== Conservative Party of Canada leadership election, 2022 ===
Conservative Leadership Election, September 10, 2022 First and only ballot
Candidate	Votes cast		Points won	
Pierre Poilievre	295,285	70.70%	22,993.42	68.15%
Jean Charest	48,650	11.65%	5,421.62	16.07%
Leslyn Lewis	46,374	11.10%	3,269.54	9.69%
Roman Baber	22,381	5.36%	1,696.76	5.03%
Total	412,690	98.81%	33,737.99	98.94%
Sources: Conservative Party of Canada

== See also ==
- Electoral history of Kim Campbell – Charest's principle opponent in the 1993 PC leadership election
- Electoral history of Jean Chrétien – Charest's opponent in the 1997 federal election
- Electoral history of Pierre Poilievre – Charest's principle opponent in the 2022 Conservative leadership election
