= Electoral history of Paul Martin =

List of elections featuring Paul Martin as a candidate

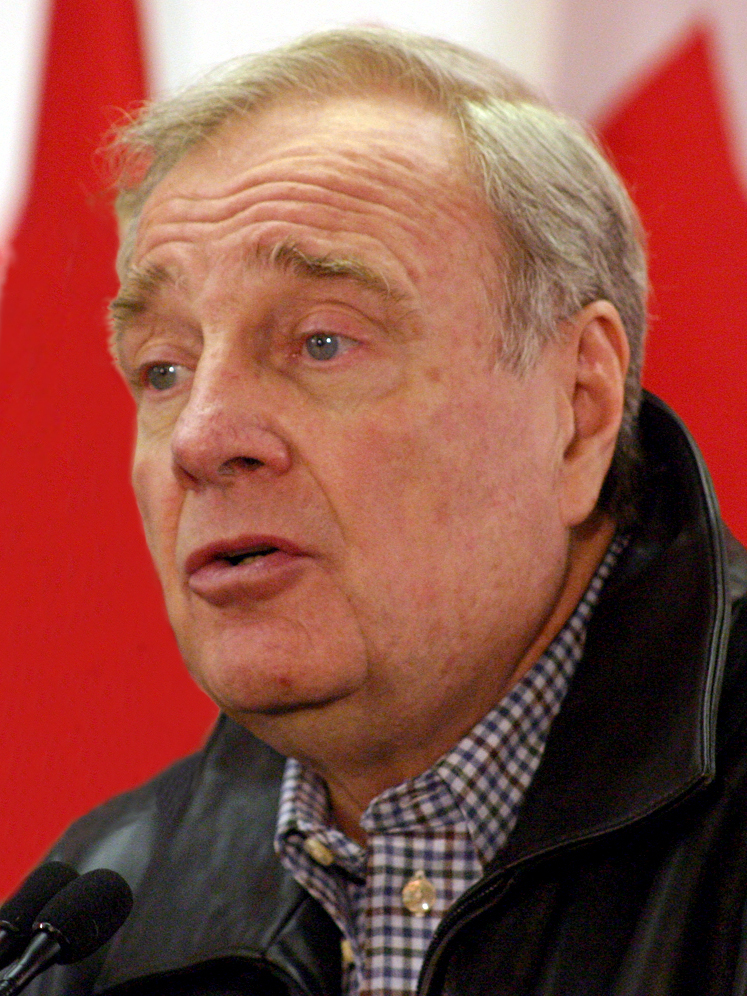
Paul Martin in 2006.

This article is the Electoral history of Paul Martin, the twenty-first prime minister of Canada.

A liberal, Martin served one term as prime minister (2003 to 2006), succeeding Jean Chrétien.

Martin led the Liberal Party of Canada in two general elections (2004 and 2006). Following his defeat in the 2006 election, he resigned as prime minister and party leader. He was succeeded as prime minister by Stephen Harper, leader of the Conservative Party of Canada. Stéphane Dion succeeded him as leader of the Liberal Party.

Martin stood for election to the House of Commons of Canada six times and was elected each time. He served continuously in the House from 1988 to 2008.

Martin stood for election as leader of the Liberal Party twice. He lost in 1990 to Chrétien, but he won in 2003, succeeding Chrétien as Liberal leader and prime minister.

== Summary ==
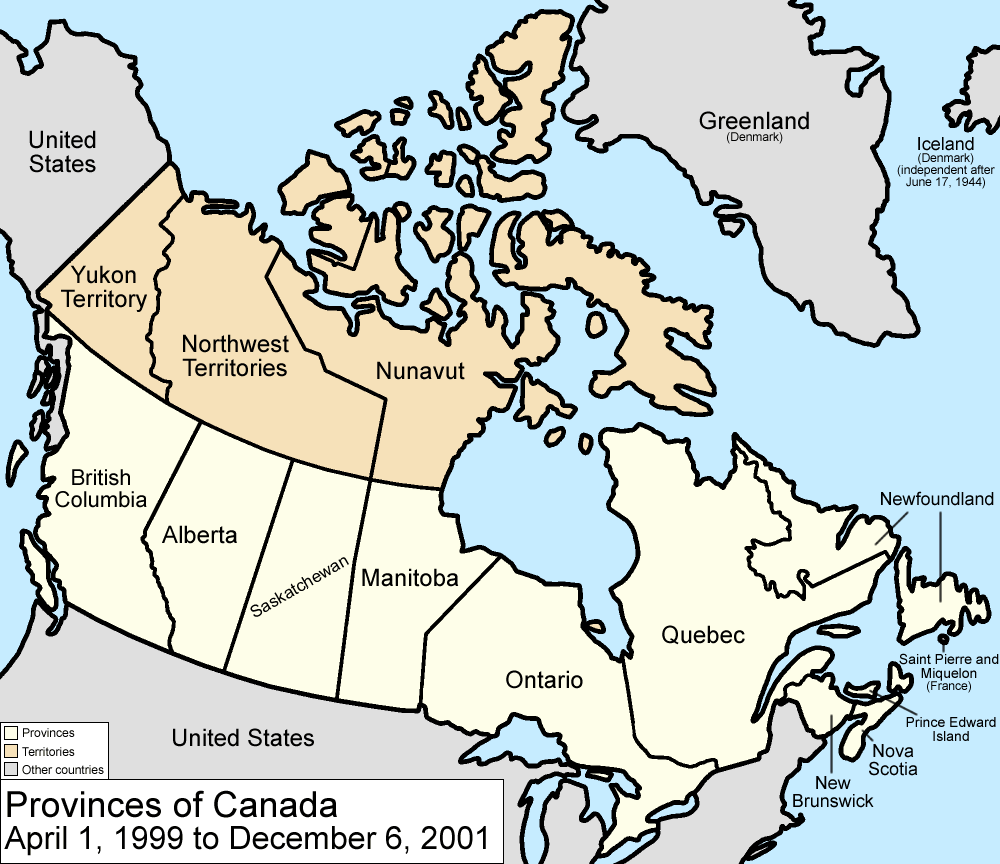
Canada had ten provinces and three territories throughout Martin's time as Prime Minister.

Martin ranks fifteenth out of twenty-three prime ministers for time in office, serving one term of two years and fifty-six days.

Martin was the seventh of eight prime ministers from Quebec, the others being Sir John Abbott, Sir Wilfrid Laurier, Louis St. Laurent, Pierre Trudeau, Brian Mulroney, Jean Chrétien, and Justin Trudeau.

Martin was first elected to the House of Commons at age 50, in the federal election of 1988. Following the Liberal victory in the 1993 general election, Martin was appointed to Cabinet as Minister of Finance by Prime Minister Jean Chrétien. He remained in Cabinet until 2002, when he resigned to begin a challenge to Chrétien's leadership of the Liberal Party.

Martin sought the leadership of the Liberal Party twice, in 1990 and 2003. He lost the 1990 challenge to Chrétien, but following Chrétien's announcement of his retirement in 2002, Martin won the 2003 leadership convention and succeeded Chrétien as Liberal leader and prime minister.

Martin led the Liberals in the general elections of 2004 and 2006. In the 2004 election, he won a minority government against Stephen Harper, but his government was defeated in the House of Commons on a motion of no confidence in November 2005. In the subsequent election in January 2006, he was defeated by Harper and the Conservatives, who formed a minority government.

Stéphane Dion succeeded him as leader of the Liberal Party.

Martin stood for election to the House of Commons six times, and was elected each time, for the riding of LaSalle—Émard. His total service in the House of Commons was nineteen years, ten months, and twenty-three days.

Following his defeat in the 2006 election, he resigned as Liberal leader, but remained in the House of Commons until the 2008 general election. He then retired from politics.

== Federal general elections: 2004 and 2006 ==
Martin led the Liberal Party in two general elections: 2004 and 2006. He was reduced to a minority government in the 2004 election, but lost to Harper and the Conservative Party of Canada in the 2006 election.

=== Federal general election: 2004 ===
In his first general election, Martin won a minority government, defeating the new Conservative leader, Stephen Harper. However, he lost the majority the Liberals went into the election with.

Canadian Federal Election, 2004 - Parties, Leaders, Seats Won and Popular Vote
| Party | Leaders | Seats Won | Popular Vote |
|---|---|---|---|
| Liberal | Paul Martin^{1} | 135 | 36.7% |
| Conservative | Stephen Harper^{2} | 99 | 29.6% |
| Bloc Québécois | Gilles Duceppe | 54 | 12.4% |
| New Democratic Party | Jack Layton | 19 | 15.7% |
| Independent | – | 1 | 0.5% |
| Total | | 308 | 94.9%^{3} |
Sources: Library of Parliament – History of Federal Ridings since 1867

^{1} Prime Minister when election was called; Prime Minister after election.
^{2} Leader of the Opposition when election was called; Leader of the Opposition after the election.
^{3} Table does not include parties which received votes but did not elect any members.

=== Federal general election: 2006 ===
In his second general election, Martin was defeated by Harper, who formed a minority government.

Canadian Federal Election, 2006 - Parties, Leaders, Seats Won and Popular Vote
| Party | Leaders | Seats Won | Popular Vote |
|---|---|---|---|
| Conservative | Stephen Harper^{1} | 124 | 36.3% |
| Liberal | Paul Martin^{2} | 103 | 30.2% |
| Bloc Québécois | Gilles Duceppe | 51 | 10.5% |
| New Democratic Party | Jack Layton | 29 | 17.5% |
| Independent | – | 1 | 0.6% |
| Total | | 308 | 95.1%^{3} |
Sources: Library of Parliament – History of Federal Ridings since 1867

^{1} Leader of the Opposition when election was called; Prime Minister after election.
^{2} Prime Minister when election was called; Member of Parliament after the election.
^{3} Table does not include parties which received votes but did not elect any members.

== Federal constituency elections: 1988 to 2006 ==
Martin stood for election to the House of Commons eight times. He was elected each time, often with substantial majorities.

=== 1988 Federal Election: LaSalle—Émard ===
Federal Election, 1988: LaSalle—Émard, Quebec
| Party | Candidate | Popular Vote | % |
|---|---|---|---|
| Liberal | Yes Paul Martin | 23,394 | 45.5% |
| Progressive Conservative | X Claude Lanthier | 21,979 | 42.7% |
| New Democratic Party | Jean-Claude Bohrer | 5,458 | 10.6% |
| Non-affiliated | Ginette Boutet | 305 | 0.6% |
| Communist | Ginette Gauthier | 212 | 0.4% |
| Commonwealth of Canada | Nancy Guice | 117 | 0.2% |
| Total | | 51,465 | 100.0% |
Source: Library of Parliament – History of Federal Ridings since 1867: LaSalle—Émard

Yes Elected.
X Incumbent.

=== 1993 Federal Election: LaSalle—Émard ===
Federal Election, 1993: LaSalle—Émard, Quebec
| Party | Candidate | Popular Vote | % |
|---|---|---|---|
| Liberal | Yes Paul Martin | 30,869 | 59.5% |
| Bloc Québécois | Éric Cimon | 17,279 | 33.3% |
| Progressive Conservative | Johanne Senécal | 2,378 | 4.6% |
| New Democratic Party | Richard Belzile | 707 | 1.4% |
| Natural Law | George Amarica | 418 | 0.8% |
| Commonwealth of Canada | Giampaolo Carli | 120 | 0.2% |
| Abolitionist | Thérèse Turmel | 103 | 0.2% |
| Total | | 51,874 | 100.0% |
Source: Library of Parliament – History of Federal Ridings since 1867: LaSalle—Émard

Yes Elected.
X Incumbent.

=== 1997 Federal Election: LaSalle—Émard ===
Federal Election, 1997: LaSalle—Émard, Quebec
| Party | Candidate | Popular Vote | % |
|---|---|---|---|
| Liberal | Yes Paul Martin | 32,317 | 60.9% |
| Bloc Québécois | Jean-Pierre Chalifoux | 12,953 | 24.4% |
| Progressive Conservative | Josée Bélanger | 6,445 | 12.1% |
| New Democratic Party | Joe Bowman | 920 | 1.7% |
| Natural Law | Russell Guest | 453 | 0.9% |
| Total | | 53,088 | 100.0% |
Source: Library of Parliament – History of Federal Ridings since 1867: LaSalle—Émard

Yes Elected.
X Incumbent.

=== 2000 Federal Election: LaSalle—Émard ===
Federal Election, 2000: LaSalle—Émard, Quebec
| Party | Candidate | Popular Vote | % |
|---|---|---|---|
| Liberal | Yes Paul Martin | 32,069 | 65.8% |
| Bloc Québécois | Denis Martel | 11,805 | 24.2% |
| Canadian Alliance | Giuseppe Joe De Santis | 1,806 | 3.7% |
| Progressive Conservative | Deepak T. Massand | 1,111 | 2.3% |
| New Democratic Party | David Bernans | 837 | 1.7% |
| Marijuana | Mathieux St-Cyr | 765 | 1.6% |
| Natural Law | Gilles Bigras | 273 | 0.6% |
| Communist | Irma Ortiz | 107 | 0.2% |
| Total | | 48,773 | 100.1%^{1} |
Source: Library of Parliament – History of Federal Ridings since 1867: LaSalle—Émard

Yes Elected.
X Incumbent.
^{1} Rounding error.

=== 2004 Federal Election: LaSalle—Émard ===
Federal Election, 2004: LaSalle—Émard, Quebec
| Party | Candidate | Popular Vote | % |
|---|---|---|---|
| Liberal | Yes Paul Martin | 25,806 | 56.6% |
| Bloc Québécois | Thierry Larrivée | 14,001 | 30.7% |
| Conservative | Nicole Roy-Arcelin | 2,271 | 5.0% |
| New Democratic Party | Rebecca Blaikie | 1,995 | 4.4% |
| Green | Douglas Jack | 1,000 | 2.2% |
| Marijuana | Marc Boris St-Maurice | 349 | 0.8% |
| Marxist–Leninist | Jean-Paul Bédard | 210 | 0.4% |
| Total | | 45,632 | 100.1%^{1} |
Source: Library of Parliament – History of Federal Ridings since 1867: LaSalle—Émard

Yes Elected.
X Incumbent.
^{1} Rounding error.

=== 2006 Federal Election: LaSalle—Émard ===
Federal Election, 2006: LaSalle—Émard, Quebec
| Party | Candidate | Popular Vote | % |
|---|---|---|---|
| Liberal | Yes Paul Martin | 22,751 | 48.4% |
| Bloc Québécois | May Chiu | 13,501 | 28.7% |
| Conservative | Georges-Alexandre Bastien | 5,994 | 12.8% |
| New Democratic Party | Russ Johnson | 2,805 | 6.0% |
| Green | Serge Bellemare | 1,512 | 3.2% |
| Independent | Jean-Philippe LeBleu | 281 | 0.6% |
| Marxist–Leninist | Jean-Paul Bédard | 152 | 0.3% |
| Total | | 46,997 | 100.0% |
Source: Library of Parliament – History of Federal Ridings since 1867: LaSalle—Émard

Yes Elected.
X Incumbent.

== Liberal Party Leadership Conventions: 1990 and 2003 ==
Martin contested the Liberal leadership twice. He lost in 1990 to Chrétien, who then led the Liberal party in the next three general elections. Turner retired in 2003 and Martin won the subsequent leadership convention.

=== 1990 Leadership Convention ===
Following the Liberal defeat in the 1988 general election, Turner announced his retirement. At the leadership convention held in 1990, Martin lost to Chrétien, who became the Liberal leader.

Liberal Leadership Convention, June 23, 1990 Voting results by ballot
| Candidate | First Ballot | |
| Candidate | Votes cast | % |
|---|---|---|
| Jean Chrétien | 2,652 | 56.9% |
| Paul Martin | 1,176 | 25.2% |
| Sheila Copps | 499 | 10.7% |
| Tom Wappel | 267 | 5.7% |
| John Nunziata | 64 | 1.4% |
| Total | 4,658 | 99.9%^{1} |
Source: CPAC – 1990 Liberal Leadership Convention

^{1} Rounding error.

=== 2003 Leadership Convention ===
In 2002, Chrétien announced that he would retire in 2003. At the 2003 leadership convention, Martin overwhelmingly won the Liberal leadership on the first ballot.

Liberal Leadership Convention, November 14, 2003 Voting results by ballot
| Candidate | First Ballot | |
| Candidate | Votes cast | % |
|---|---|---|
| Paul Martin | 3,242 | 93.9% |
| Sheila Copps | 211 | 6.1% |
| Total | 3,453 | 100.0% |
Source: CPAC – 2003 Liberal Leadership Convention

== See also ==
- Electoral history of Jean Chrétien – Martin's predecessor as leader of the Liberal Party and as prime minister.
- Electoral history of Stephen Harper – Martin's successor as prime minister and principal opponent in two general elections.
