= Electoral history of Justin Trudeau =

Elections with Justin Trudeau as candidate

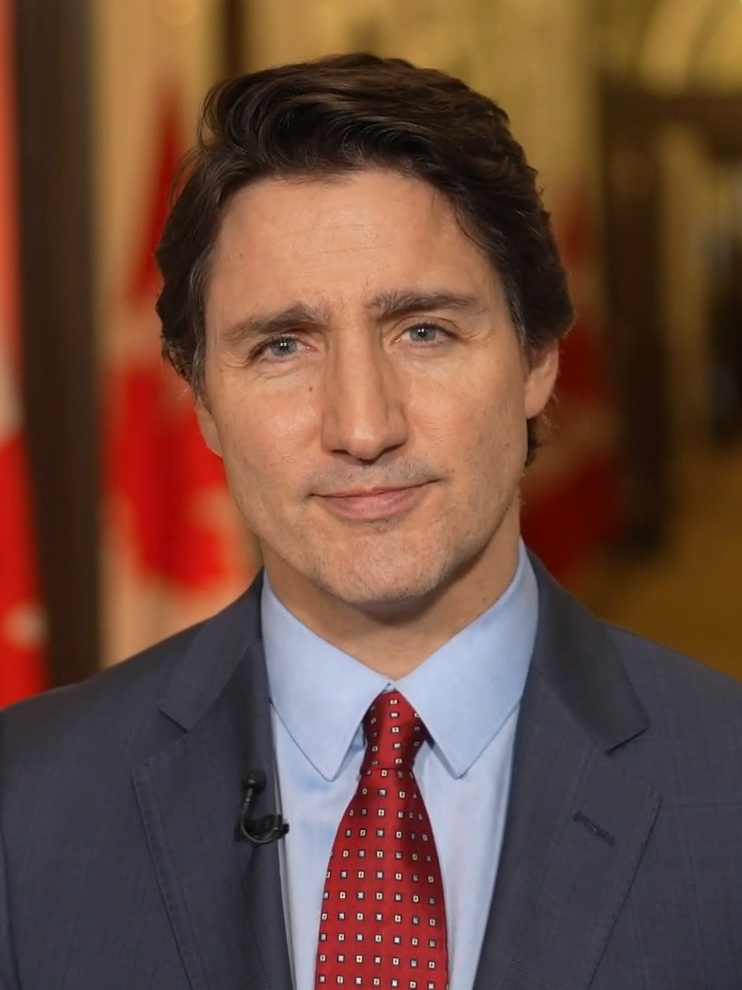
Trudeau in 2023

This article is the Electoral history of Justin Trudeau, the twenty-third Prime Minister of Canada. Trudeau served as prime minister from November 4, 2015 to March 14, 2025, having won three general elections.

A liberal, Trudeau was successful in his first general election as leader of the Liberal Party, which he defeated then-Prime Minister Stephen Harper and the Conservatives in the general election of 2015 and formed a majority government. He was re-elected with a minority government in 2019 and again in 2021. He resigned the party leadership in 2025 and was succeeded by Mark Carney.

Trudeau has stood for election to the House of Commons five times and was elected each time (2008, 2011, 2015, 2019, 2021), until he retired in 2025.

Unlike his predecessor and recent contemporaries, Trudeau never lost an election as party leader, nor as an MP, or a nomination; he was also the first prime minister to retire since former prime minister Jean Chrétien retired in 2003, and was succeeded as party leader, and prime minister by Paul Martin.

Trudeau was elected leader of the Liberal Party in 2013, succeeding Michael Ignatieff, who retired from politics after losing the general election of 2011.

== Summary ==
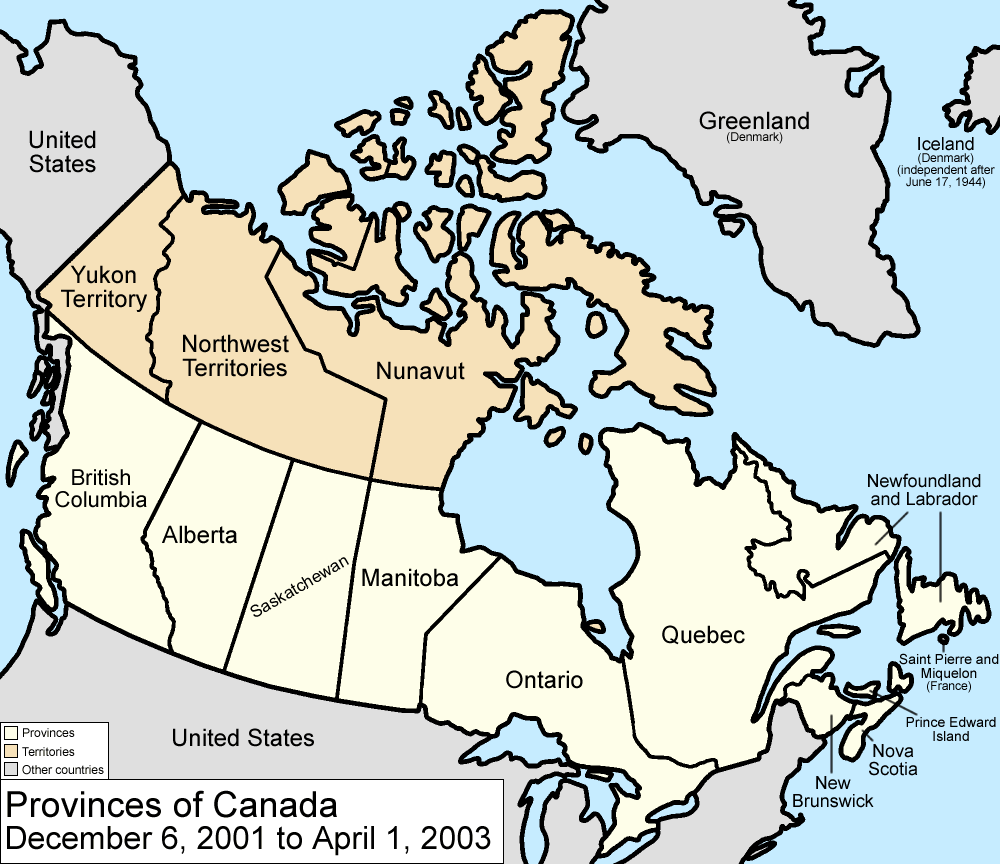
Canada had ten provinces and three territories throughout Trudeau's time as Prime Minister.

Trudeau currently ranks seventh out of twenty-three prime ministers for time in office, serving one term of nine years and one hundred thirty days.

Trudeau is the eighth prime minister from Quebec, the others being Sir John Abbott, Sir Wilfrid Laurier, Louis St. Laurent, Pierre Trudeau, Brian Mulroney, Jean Chrétien and Paul Martin. He is also the fifth francophone prime minister, the others being Laurier, St. Laurent, Pierre Trudeau, and Chrétien.

Trudeau was first elected to the House of Commons in 2008, at age 36. The Liberals were in opposition after the 2008 and 2011 general elections. Under Liberal leader Stéphane Dion, Trudeau was the Liberal critic for Citizenship and Immigration, Youth and Multiculturalism. The next leader, Michael Ignatieff, appointed him critic for Sports and Post-Secondary Education.

In the 2011 general election, the Liberals under the leadership of Ignatieff were reduced to third party status, their worst showing in history. Ignatieff lost his own seat and retired from politics. Trudeau announced he would seek the party leadership. In the 2013 vote, he won the leadership on the first ballot with 80% support.

Trudeau led the Liberals in the general election of 2015. At dissolution, the Liberals were in third place in the Commons, behind the Conservative Party, which held a majority government, and the New Democratic Party, which formed the Official Opposition. Trudeau led the Liberals to a majority government, defeating both the Conservatives led by Stephen Harper and the New Democrats led by Thomas Mulcair. Trudeau's government was sworn in on November 4, 2015.

Trudeau has stood for election to the House of Commons five times (in 2008, 2011, 2015, 2019 and 2021), each time from the riding of Papineau, in Montreal, Quebec. He has served in the House of Commons for 16 years, 196 days.

Although Trudeau was successful in leading the party in three general elections, a political crisis led to Trudeau's retirement early in 2025. He was succeeded by Mark Carney as prime minister and Liberal leader. Trudeau remained a Member of Parliament and sat as a Liberal back-bencher in the House of Commons until the 2025 general election, when he retired from politics.

== Federal general elections: 2015 to 2021 ==
Trudeau led the Liberal Party in three general elections. He won three (2015, 2019 and 2021). He won a majority government in the 2015 election, and two minority governments in the 2019 and 2021 elections.

=== Federal general election: 2015 ===
In his first general election as a party leader, Trudeau led the Liberals from third place in the House of Commons at dissolution to win a majority government, defeating incumbent prime minister Stephen Harper and the Conservatives.

Canadian Federal Election, 2015 - Parties, Leaders, Seats Won and Popular Vote
Party	Leaders	Seats Won	Popular Vote
Liberal	Justin Trudeau^{1}	184	39.47%
Conservative	Stephen Harper^{2}	99	31.9%
New Democratic Party	Thomas Mulcair^{3}	44	19.7%
Bloc Québécois	Gilles Duceppe	10	4.7%
Green	Elizabeth May	1	3.5%
Total		338	99.3%^{4}
Sources: Library of Parliament – History of Federal Ridings since 1867

^{1} Leader of a third party when election was called; Prime Minister after election.
^{2} Prime Minister when election was called; Member of Parliament after the election.
^{3} Leader of the Opposition when election was called; leader of a third party after the election.
^{4} Table does not include parties which received votes but did not elect any members.

=== Federal general election: 2019 ===
In his second general election, Trudeau was re-elected with a minority government but lost the popular vote, defeating the new Conservative leader, Andrew Scheer.

Canadian Federal Election, 2019 - Parties, Leaders, Seats Won and Popular Vote
Party	Leaders	Seats Won	Popular Vote
Liberal	Justin Trudeau^{1}	157	33.1%
Conservative	Andrew Scheer^{2}	121	34.4%
Bloc Québécois	Yves-François Blanchet	32	7.7%
New Democratic Party	Jagmeet Singh	24	15.9%
Green	Elizabeth May	3	6.5%
Independent		1	0.4%
Total		338	98.0%^{3}
Sources: Elections Canada: October 21, 2019 Federal Election - Election Results

^{1} Prime Minister when election was called; Prime Minister after election.
^{2} Leader of the Opposition when election was called; Leader of the Opposition after the election.
^{3} Table does not include parties which received votes but did not elect any members.

=== Federal general election: 2021 ===
In his third general election, Trudeau was re-elected with another minority government but lost the popular vote, defeating the new Conservative leader, Erin O'Toole.

Canadian Federal Election, 2021 - Parties, Leaders, Seats Won and Popular Vote
Party	Leaders	Seats Won	Popular Vote
Liberal	Justin Trudeau^{1}	160	32.6%
Conservative	Erin O'Toole^{2}	119	33.7%
Bloc Québécois	Yves-François Blanchet	32	7.6%
New Democratic Party	Jagmeet Singh	25	17.8%
Green	Annamie Paul	2	2.3%
Total		338	94.15%^{3}

^{1} Prime Minister when election was called; Prime Minister after election.
^{2} Leader of the Opposition when election was called; Leader of the Opposition after the election.
^{3} Table does not include parties which received votes but did not elect any members.

== Federal constituency elections: 2008 to 2021 ==
Trudeau has stood for election to the House of Commons five times (in 2008, 2011, 2015, 2019 and 2021). He was elected all five times, each time from the riding of Papineau, in Montreal, Quebec.

=== 2008 Federal Election: Papineau ===
Federal Election, 2008: Papineau, Quebec
Party	Candidate	Popular Vote	%
Liberal	Yes Justin Trudeau	17,724	41.5%
Bloc Québécois	X Vivian Barbot	16,535	38.7%
New Democratic Party	Costa Zafiropoulos	3,734	8.7%
Conservative	Mustaque Sarker	3,262	7.6%
Green	Ingrid Hein	1,213	2.8%
Independent	Mahmoud Raza Baig	267	0.6%
Total		42,735	99.9%^{1}
Source: Library of Parliament – History of Federal Ridings since 1867: Papineau

Yes Elected.
X Incumbent.
^{1} Rounding error.

=== 2011 Federal Election: Papineau ===
Federal Election, 2011: Papineau, Quebec
Party	Candidate	Popular Vote	%
Liberal	Yes X Justin Trudeau	16,429	38.4%
New Democratic Party	Marcos Radomes Tejada	12,102	28.3%
Bloc Québécois	Vivian Barbot	11,091	25.9%
Conservative	Shama Chopra	2,021	4.7%
Green	Danny Polifroni	806	1.9%
Marxist–Leninist	Peter Macrisopoulos	228	0.5%
Non-affiliated	Joseph Young	95	0.2%
Total		42,772	99.9%^{1}
Source: Library of Parliament – History of Federal Ridings since 1867: Papineau

Yes Elected.
X Incumbent.
^{1} Rounding error.

=== 2015 Federal Election: Papineau ===
Federal Election, 2015: Papineau, Quebec
Party	Candidate	Popular Vote	%
Liberal	Yes X Justin Trudeau	26,391	52.0%
New Democratic Party	Anne Lagacé Dowson	13,132	25.9%
Bloc Québécois	Maxime Claveau	6,182	12.2%
Conservative	Yvon Vadnais	2,390	4.7%
Green	Danny Polifroni	1,443	2.8%
Independent	Chris Lloyd	505	1.0%
Rhinoceros	Tommy Gaudet	323	0.6%
Independent	Kim Waldron	159	0.3%
Marxist–Leninist	Peter Macrisopoulos	142	0.3%
Non-affiliated	Beverly Bernardo	103	0.2%
Total		50,770	100.0%
Source: Library of Parliament – History of Federal Ridings since 1867: Papineau

Yes Elected.
X Incumbent.

=== 2019 Federal Election: Papineau ===
Federal Election, 2019: Papineau, Quebec
Party	Candidate	Popular Vote	%
Liberal	Yes X Justin Trudeau	24,797	51.2%
New Democratic	Christine Paré	9,135	18.9%
Bloc Québécois	Christian Gagnon	7,722	15.9%
Green	Juan Vazquez	3,673	7.6%
Conservative	Sophie Veilleux	2,095	4.3%
Rhinoceros	Jean-Patrick Cacereco Berthiaume	334	0.7%
People's	Mark Sibthorpe	311	0.6%
Christian Heritage	Susanne Lefebvre	184	0.4%
No affiliation	Luc Lupien	73	0.2%
Independent	Alain Magnan	73	0.2%
No affiliation	Steve Penner	54	0.1%
Total		48,451	100.1%^{1}
Source: Library of Parliament – History of Federal Ridings since 1867: Papineau

Yes Elected.
X Incumbent.
^{1} Rounding error.

=== 2021 Federal Election: Papineau ===
Federal Election, 2021: Papineau, Quebec
Party	Candidate	Popular Vote	%
Liberal	Yes X Justin Trudeau	22,848	50.3%
New Democratic	Christine Paré	10,303	22.6%
Bloc Québécois	Nabila Ben Youssef	6,830	15.0%
Conservative	Julio Rivera	2,198	4.8%
Green	Alain Lepine	1,458	3.2%
People's	Christian Boutin	1,064	2.3%
Rhinoceros	Above Znoneofthe	418	0.9%
Marxist–Leninist	Garnet Colly	115	0.3%
Independent	Raymond Martin	102	0.2%
Independent	Béatrice Zako	97	0.2%
Total		45,423	99.8%^{1}
Source: Elections Canada - September 21, 2021 Federal Election - Election Results - Papineau

Yes Elected.
X Incumbent.
^{1} Rounding error.

== 2013 Liberal Party leadership election ==
Following the 2011 general election, the leader of the Liberals, Michael Ignatieff, announced his retirement. Trudeau entered the leadership contest, which was held in April, 2013. The vote was based on the 308 Liberal riding associations, which each had 100 points. All members of the party had the right to vote in the election through their riding associations. The points for each riding association were allocated in proportion to the local vote.

Liberal Leadership Election, April 14, 2013 First and only ballot
Candidate	Votes cast		Points won	
Justin Trudeau	81,389	78.8%	24,668	80.1%
Joyce Murray	12,148	11.8%	3,130	10.2%
Martha Hall Findlay	6,585	6.4%	1,760	5.7%
Martin Cauchon	1,630	1.6%	815	2.6%
Deborah Coyne	833	0.8%	214	0.7%
Karen McCrimmon	757	0.7%	210	0.7%
Total	103,342	100.1%^{1}	30,797	100.0%
Sources: Huffington Post: Justin Trudeau Wins Liberal Leadership Race In Resounding Fashion; Globe & Mail: Justin Trudeau elected Liberal leader in a landslide.

^{1} Rounding error.

== See also ==
- Electoral history of Stephen Harper – Trudeau's predecessor as prime minister.
- Electoral history of Mark Carney – Trudeau's successor as leader of the Liberal Party and as prime minister.
