= Electoral history of Stephen Harper =

Elections with Stephen Harper as candidate

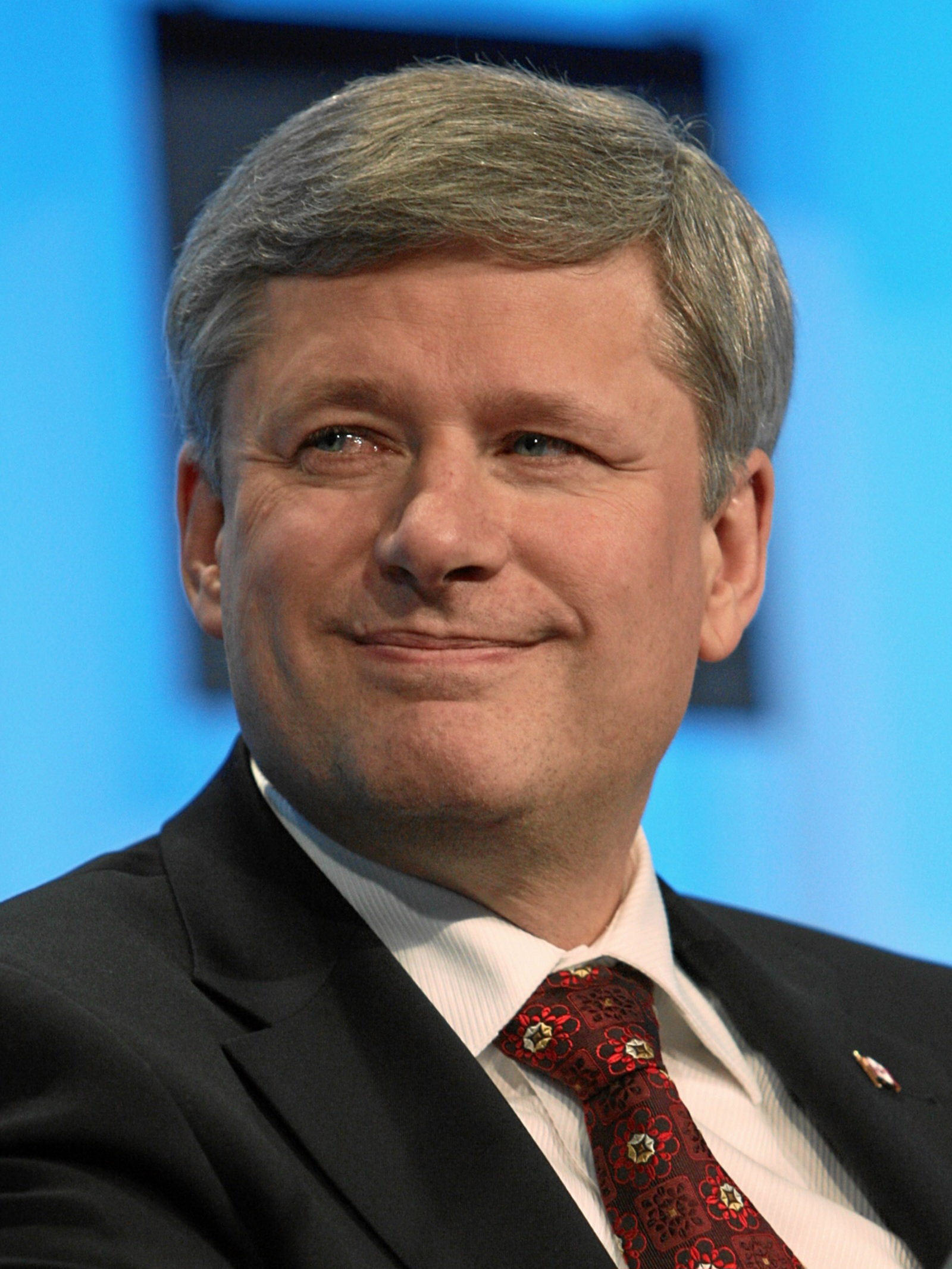
Stephen Harper in 2010.

This is the electoral history of Stephen Harper, the twenty-second prime minister of Canada. Harper served as prime minister from February 6, 2006 to November 4, 2015, having won three general elections.

A conservative, Harper was unsuccessful in his first general election as leader of the Conservative Party, which re-elected then-Prime Minister Paul Martin and the Liberals with a minority government. However, less than two years later Harper defeated Martin in the general election of 2006 and formed a minority government. Harper was re-elected with a minority government in 2008, and then a majority government in the election of 2011.

Harper was defeated in the 2015 general election by Justin Trudeau and the Liberals, who succeeded him as prime minister. His successor as leader of the Conservative Party was Andrew Scheer.

Harper stood for election to the House of Commons eight times, first for the Reform Party, then for the Canadian Alliance, and finally for the Conservative Party. He was defeated on his first attempt, but elected the next seven times.

Harper took a break from electoral politics from 1998 to 2002, when he was the president of the National Citizens Coalition.

Following the 2015 general election defeat, Harper resigned as leader of the Conservative Party. He retired from politics in 2016.

== Summary ==
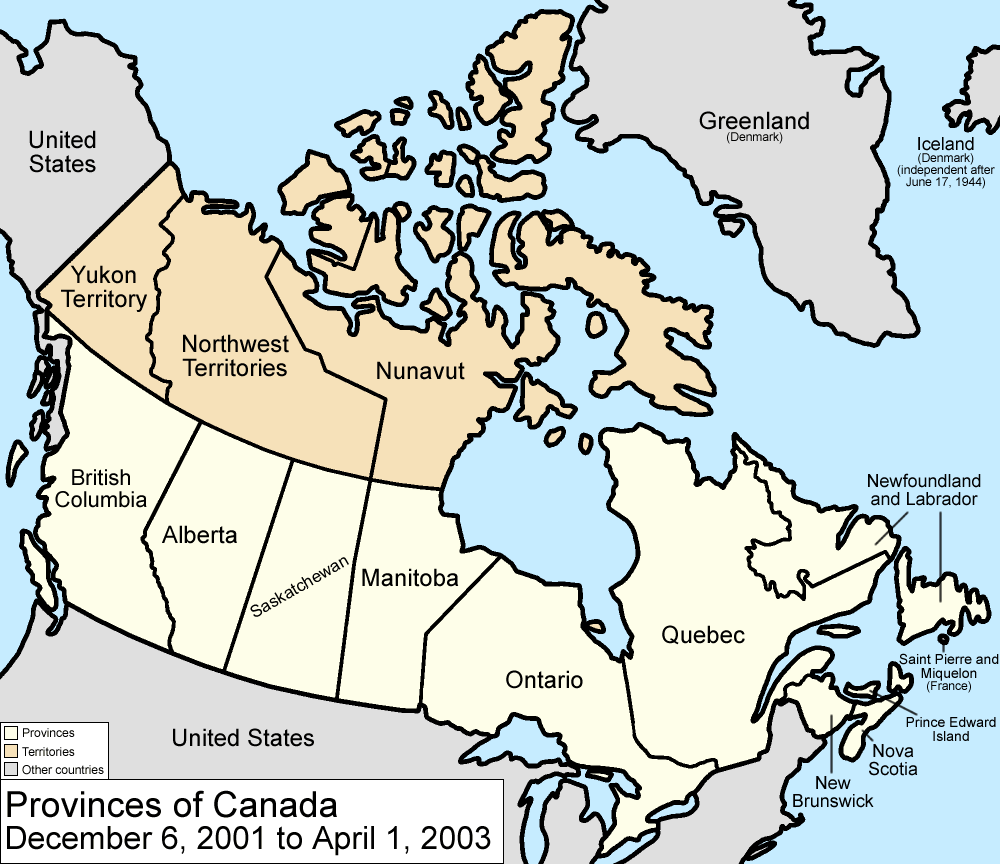
Canada had ten provinces and three territories throughout Harper's time as Prime Minister.

Harper ranks sixth out of twenty-three prime ministers for time in office, serving as prime minister for nine years, 271 days. He is the third Conservative to win three elections, following Sir John A. Macdonald and John Diefenbaker, and the second-longest serving Conservative prime minister, after Macdonald.

Harper was the third prime minister from Alberta, the others being R. B. Bennett and Joe Clark.

Harper was originally from Ontario and a Liberal Party supporter, but in his early twenties he moved to Alberta. He became involved in Progressive Conservative politics and then gradually in the formation of the new Reform Party, working as Reform's chief policy officer. He served one term as a Reform Member of Parliament, but then resigned to become the president of the National Citizens Coalition (1998–2002).

In 2002, Harper was elected leader of the Canadian Alliance, the successor to the Reform Party, and began merger talks with the Progressive Conservative party, known as the Unite the Right movement. After the merger was achieved, he became the first leader of the new Conservative Party of Canada, and led the party in the 2004 general election. Although defeated by Prime Minister Paul Martin and the Liberal Party, Harper and the Conservatives become the Official Opposition. Two years later, Harper and the Conservatives won the 2006 general election, forming a minority government. Harper successfully led the Conservative Party in the next two elections, being returned with a minority government in 2008, and then with a majority government in 2011. He was defeated by the Liberals led by Justin Trudeau in the 2015 general election. On election night, he announced he would be resigning as leader of the Conservative Party.

Harper stood for election to the House of Commons eight times, all in Alberta ridings. He was unsuccessful in his first election (1988), but was elected the next five times (four general elections and one by-election).

Following his resignation as prime minister and Conservative leader, Harper remained a Member of Parliament and sat as a Conservative back-bencher in the House of Commons until he resigned his seat and retired from politics in 2016.

== Federal general elections: 2004 to 2015 ==
Harper led the Conservative Party in five general elections. He won three (2006, 2008 and 2011) and lost two (2004 and 2015). He won two minority governments in the 2006 and 2008 elections, and a majority government in the 2011 election. He lost the 2015 election to Justin Trudeau.

=== Federal general election: 2004 ===
In his first general election as a party leader, Harper reduced Martin's government from a majority to a minority government. Harper retained his position as Leader of the Official Opposition.

Canadian Federal Election, 2004 - Parties, Leaders, Seats Won and Popular Vote
Party	Leaders	Seats Won	Popular Vote
Liberal	Paul Martin^{1}	135	36.7%
Conservative	Stephen Harper^{2}	99	29.6%
Bloc Québécois	Gilles Duceppe	54	12.4%
New Democratic Party	Jack Layton	19	15.7%
Independent	–	1	0.5%
Total		308	94.9%^{3}
Sources: Library of Parliament – History of Federal Ridings since 1867

^{1} Prime Minister when election was called; Prime Minister after election.
^{2} Leader of the Opposition when election was called; Leader of the Opposition after the election.
^{3} Table does not include parties which received votes but did not elect any members.

=== Federal general election: 2006 ===
In his second general election, Harper defeated Prime Minister Martin and formed a minority government.

Canadian Federal Election, 2006 - Parties, Leaders, Seats Won and Popular Vote
Party	Leaders	Seats Won	Popular Vote
Conservative	Stephen Harper^{1}	124	36.3%
Liberal	Paul Martin^{2}	103	30.2%
Bloc Québécois	Gilles Duceppe	51	10.5%
New Democratic Party	Jack Layton	29	17.5%
Independent	–	1	0.6%
Total		308	95.1%^{3}
Sources: Library of Parliament – History of Federal Ridings since 1867

^{1} Leader of the Opposition when election was called; Prime Minister after election.
^{2} Prime Minister when election was called; Member of Parliament after the election.
^{3} Table does not include parties which received votes but did not elect any members.

=== Federal general election: 2008 ===
In his third general election, Harper was re-elected with another minority government, defeating the new Liberal leader, Stéphane Dion.

Canadian Federal Election, 2008 - Parties, Leaders, Seats Won and Popular Vote
Party	Leaders	Seats Won	Popular Vote
Conservative	Stephen Harper^{1}	143	37.7%
Liberal	Stéphane Dion^{2}	77	26.3%
Bloc Québécois	Gilles Duceppe	49	10.0%
New Democratic Party	Jack Layton	37	18.2%
Independent	–	2	0.7%
Total		308	92.9%^{3}
Sources: Library of Parliament – History of Federal Ridings since 1867

^{1} Prime Minister when election was called; Prime Minister after election.
^{2} Leader of the Opposition when election was called; Leader of the Opposition after the election.
^{3} Table does not include parties which received votes but did not elect any members.

=== Federal general election: 2011 ===
In his fourth general election, Harper was re-elected with a majority government, defeating the new Liberal leader, Michael Ignatieff.

Canadian Federal Election, 2011 - Parties, Leaders, Seats Won and Popular Vote
Party	Leaders	Seats Won	Popular Vote
Conservative	Stephen Harper^{1}	166	39.6%
New Democratic Party	Jack Layton^{2}	103	30.6%
Liberal	Michael Ignatieff^{3}	34	18.9%
Bloc Québécois	Gilles Duceppe	4	6.0%
Green	Elizabeth May	1	3.9%
Total		308	99.0%^{4}
Sources: Library of Parliament – History of Federal Ridings since 1867

^{1} Prime Minister when election was called; Prime Minister after election.
^{2} Leader of a third party when election was called; Leader of the Opposition after the election.
^{3} Leader of the Opposition when election was called; not a Member of Parliament after the election.
^{4} Table does not include parties which received votes but did not elect any members.

=== Federal general election: 2015 ===
In his fifth general election, Harper was defeated by the new Liberal leader, Justin Trudeau, who formed a majority government.

Canadian Federal Election, 2015 - Parties, Leaders, Seats Won and Popular Vote
Party	Leaders	Seats Won	Popular Vote
Liberal	Justin Trudeau^{1}	184	39.47%
Conservative	Stephen Harper^{2}	99	31.9%
New Democratic Party	Thomas Mulcair^{3}	44	19.7%
Bloc Québécois	Gilles Duceppe	10	4.7%
Green	Elizabeth May	1	3.5%
Total		338	99.3%^{4}
Sources: Library of Parliament – History of Federal Ridings since 1867

^{1} Leader of a third party when election was called; Prime Minister after election.
^{2} Prime Minister when election was called; Member of Parliament after the election.
^{3} Leader of the Opposition when election was called; leader of a third party after the election.
^{4} Table does not include parties which received votes but did not elect any members.

== Federal constituency elections: 1988, 1993; 2002 to 2015 ==
Harper stood for election to the House of Commons eight times. He was defeated the first time, in the general election of 1988, but was elected the next seven times (six general elections and one by-election).

=== 1988 Federal Election: Calgary West ===
Federal Election, 1988: Calgary West, Alberta
Party	Candidate	Popular Vote	%
Progressive Conservative	Yes X Jim Hawkes	32,025	58.5%
Reform	Stephen Harper	9,074	16.6%
Liberal	John Phillips	6,880	12.6%
New Democratic Party	Richard D. Vanderberg	6,355	11.6%
Libertarian	David Faren	225	0.4%
Confederation of Regions	Brent Morin	170	0.2%
Total		54,729	99.9%^{1}
Source: Library of Parliament – History of Federal Ridings since 1867: Calgary West

Yes Elected.
X Incumbent.
^{1} Rounding error.

=== 1993 Federal Election: Calgary West ===
Federal Election, 1993: Calgary West, Alberta
Party	Candidate	Popular Vote	%
Reform	Yes Stephen Harper	30,209	52.2%
Liberal	Karen Gainer	15,314	26.5%
Progressive Conservative	X Jim Hawkes	9,090	15.7%
New Democratic Party	Rudy Rogers	1,194	2.1%
National	Kathleen McNeil	1,068	1.8%
Natural Law	Frank Haika	483	0.8%
Green	Don Francis	347	0.6%
Christian Heritage	Larry R. Heather	116	0.2%
Total		57,821	99.9%^{1}
Source: Library of Parliament – History of Federal Ridings since 1867: Calgary West

Yes Elected.
X Incumbent.
^{1} Rounding error.

=== 2002 Federal By-Election: Calgary Southwest ===
The by-election was called following the resignation of the incumbent, Preston Manning, the former leader of the Reform Party, to give Harper, recently elected leader of the Alliance, an opportunity to enter the House of Commons.

Federal By-Election, May 13, 2002: Calgary Southwest, Alberta
Party	Candidate	Popular Vote	%
Alliance	Yes Stephen Harper	13,200	71.7%
New Democratic Party	Bill Phipps	3,813	20.7%
Green	James S. Kohut	660	3.6%
Independent	Gordon Barrett	428	2.3%
Christian Heritage	Ron Gray	320	1.7%
Total		18,421	100.0%
Source: Library of Parliament – History of Federal Ridings since 1867: Calgary Southwest

Yes Elected.

=== 2004 Federal Election: Calgary Southwest ===
Federal Election, 2004: Calgary Southwest, Alberta
Party	Candidate	Popular Vote	%
Conservative	Yes X Stephen Harper	35,297	68.4%
Liberal	Avalon Roberts	9,501	18.4%
Green	Darcy Kraus	3,210	6.2%
New Democratic Party	Daria Fox	2,884	5.6%
Marijuana	Mark De Pelham	516	1.0%
Christian Heritage	Larry R. Heather	229	0.4%
Total		51,637	100.0%
Source: Library of Parliament – History of Federal Ridings since 1867: Calgary Southwest

Yes Elected.
X Incumbent.

=== 2006 Federal Election: Calgary Southwest ===
Federal Election, 2006: Calgary Southwest, Alberta
Party	Candidate	Popular Vote	%
Conservative	Yes X Stephen Harper	41,549	72.4%
Liberal	Mike Swanson	6,553	11.4%
New Democratic Party	Holly Heffernan	4,628	8.1%
Green	Kim Warnke	4,407	7.7%
Christian Heritage	Larry R. Heather	279	0.5%
Total		57,416	100.1%^{1}
Source: Library of Parliament – History of Federal Ridings since 1867: Calgary Southwest

Yes Elected.
X Incumbent.
^{1} Rounding error.

=== 2008 Federal Election: Calgary Southwest ===
Federal Election, 2008: Calgary Southwest, Alberta
Party	Candidate	Popular Vote	%
Conservative	Yes X Stephen Harper	38,548	73.0%
Liberal	Marlene Lamontagne	4,918	9.3%
Green	Kelly Christie	4,743	9.0%
New Democratic Party	Holly Heffernan	4,102	7.8%
Libertarian	Dennis Young	265	0.5%
Christian Heritage	Larry R. Heather	256	0.5%
Total		52,832	100.1%^{1}
Source: Library of Parliament – History of Federal Ridings since 1867: Calgary Southwest

Yes Elected.
X Incumbent.
^{1} Rounding error.

=== 2011 Federal Election: Calgary Southwest ===
Federal Election, 2011: Calgary Southwest, Alberta
Party	Candidate	Popular Vote	%
Conservative	Yes X Stephen Harper	42,998	75.1%
New Democratic Party	Holly Heffernan	6,823	11.9%
Liberal	Marlene Lamontagne	4,121	7.2%
Green	Kelly Christie	2,991	5.2%
Christian Heritage	Larry R. Heather	303	0.5%
Total		57,236	99.9%^{1}
Source: Library of Parliament – History of Federal Ridings since 1867: Calgary Southwest

Yes Elected.
X Incumbent.
^{1} Rounding error.

Note: the electoral district was abolished in 2015.

=== 2015 Federal Election: Calgary Heritage ===
Federal Election, 2015: Calgary Heritage, Alberta
Party	Candidate	Popular Vote	%
Conservative	Yes X Stephen Harper	37,263	63.8%
Liberal	Brendan Miles	15,172	26.0%
New Democratic Party	Matt Masters Burgener	4,255	7.3%
Green	Kelly Christie	1,246	2.1%
Libertarian	Steven Paolasini	246	0.4%
Independent	Larry R. Heather	114	0.2%
Independent	Korry Zepik	73	0.1%
Independent	Nicolas Duchastel de Montrouge	61	0.1%
Total		58,430	100.0%
Source: Library of Parliament – History of Federal Ridings since 1867: Calgary Heritage

Yes Elected.
X Incumbent.
^{1} Rounding error.

Note: Harper resigned his seat on August 26, 2016.

== Leadership elections ==
Harper participated in two leadership contests: the leadership of the Canadian Alliance in 2002, and the leadership of the Conservative Party of Canada in 2004. He won both contests.

=== 2002 Canadian Alliance leadership election ===
Stockwell Day had been elected leader of the new Canadian Alliance in 2000, but his leadership triggered a caucus revolt and a new leadership vote. Every member of the party had a right to vote by mail-in ballot. Harper won on the first ballot.

Canadian Alliance Leadership Election, March 20, 2002 First and only ballot
Candidate	First Ballot	
Candidate	Votes cast	%
Stephen Harper	48,561	55.0%
Stockwell Day	33,074	37.5%
Diane Ablonczy	3,370	3.8%
Grant Hill	3,223	3.7%
Total	88,228	100.0%

=== 2004 Conservative Party leadership election ===
The Canadian Alliance and the Progressive Conservative parties merged in December 2003. In March, 2004, the party held its first leadership election. The vote was based on the 308 Conservative riding associations. Each riding association had 100 points. All party members had the right to vote through their riding associations, and each riding association's points were allocated in proportion to the local vote.

Conservative Leadership Election, March 20, 2004 First and only ballot
Candidate	Votes cast		Points won	
Stephen Harper	67,143	68.9%	17,296	56.2%
Belinda Stronach	22,286	22.9%	10,613	34.5%
Tony Clement	7,968	8.2%	2,887	9.4%
Total	97,397	100.0%	30,796	100.1%^{1}

^{1} Rounding error.

== See also ==
- Electoral history of Paul Martin – Harper's predecessor as prime minister and principal opponent in two general elections.
- Electoral history of Justin Trudeau – Harper's successor as prime minister.
