= Electoral history of Mark Carney =

Elections featuring Prime Minister of Canada

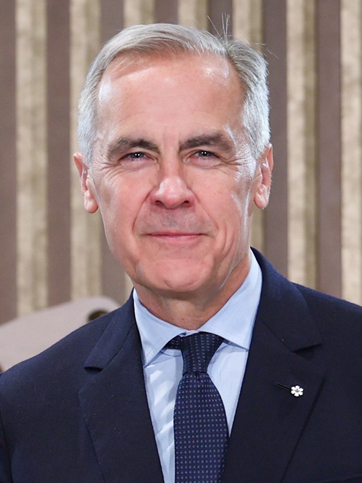
Carney in June 2025

Mark Carney has been the 24th Prime Minister of Canada since March 14, 2025 and the member of Parliament (MP) for Nepean since April 28, 2025. Unlike all of his predecessors, Carney is the first prime minister to have never held an elected public political office in Canada prior to his appointment as prime minister. Carney led the Liberal Party of Canada to a fourth consecutive victory at the 2025 Canadian federal election.

== Overview ==
Electoral history of Mark Carney — Federal general elections
Year	Party	Votes			Seats		Position
Year	Party	Total	%	±%	Total	±	Position
2025	Liberal	8,566,674	43.8%	+11.2	169 / 343	+17	Minority government

Electoral history of Mark Carney — Federal constituency elections
Year	Riding	Party	Votes for Carney				Result	Swing
Year	Riding	Party	Total	%	P.	±%	Result	Swing
2025	Nepean	Liberal	46,073	63.78%	1st	+18.04	Elected	Hold

Electoral history of Mark Carney — party leadership elections
Year	Party	Votes	%	Pts	P.	Result
2025	Liberal Party of Canada	131,674	86.84	29,456.91	1st	Won

== Federal general elections ==
=== Federal general election: 2025 ===
Canadian Federal Election, 2025 - Parties, Leaders, Seats Won and Popular Vote
Party	Leaders	Seats Won	Popular Vote
Liberal	Mark Carney^{1}	169	43.8%
Conservative	Pierre Poilievre^{2}	144	41.3%
Bloc Québécois	Yves-François Blanchet	22	6.3%
New Democratic	Jagmeet Singh	7	6.3%
Green	Elizabeth May & Jonathan Pedneault	1	1.2%
Total		343	98.9%^{3}

^{1} Prime minister when election was called; prime minister after election.
^{2} Leader of the Opposition when election was called; not a member of Parliament after the election;
^{3} Table does not include parties which received votes but did not elect any members.

== Federal constituency elections ==
=== Federal election, 2025: Nepean ===
2025 Canadian federal election: Nepean
Party	Candidate	Votes	%	±%
Liberal	Mark Carney	46,073	63.78	+18.04
Conservative	Barbara Bal	24,017	33.25	−0.12
New Democratic	Shyam Shukla	1,424	1.97	−14.25
Green	Greg Hopkins	462	0.64	−1.30
People's	Eric Fleury	261	0.36	−2.37
Total valid votes		72,237	99.42	
Total rejected ballots		420	0.58	-0.05
Turnout		72,657	77.19	+6.57
Eligible voters		94,129		
Liberal notional hold		Swing		+9.08
Source: Elections Canada

== 2025 Liberal Party leadership election ==
Mark Carney won the 2025 Liberal Party leadership election on the first ballot.

2025 Liberal Party of Canada leadership election
Candidate	First ballot			
Candidate	Votes	%	Points	%
Mark Carney	131,674	86.84	29,456.91	85.88
Chrystia Freeland	11,134	7.34	2,728.57	7.96
Karina Gould	4,785	3.16	1,100.34	3.21
Frank Baylis	4,038	2.66	1,014.18	2.96
Total valid votes	151,899	100.00	34,300.00	100.00
Turnout	151,899	92.71		
Eligible voters	163,836			
Source: Liberal Party

== See also ==
- Electoral history of Justin Trudeau – Carney's predecessor as leader of the Liberal Party and as prime minister.
- Electoral history of Pierre Poilievre – Carney's principal opponent in the 2025 general election.
