= Electoral history of Jean Chrétien =

Elections featuring Prime Minister of Canada

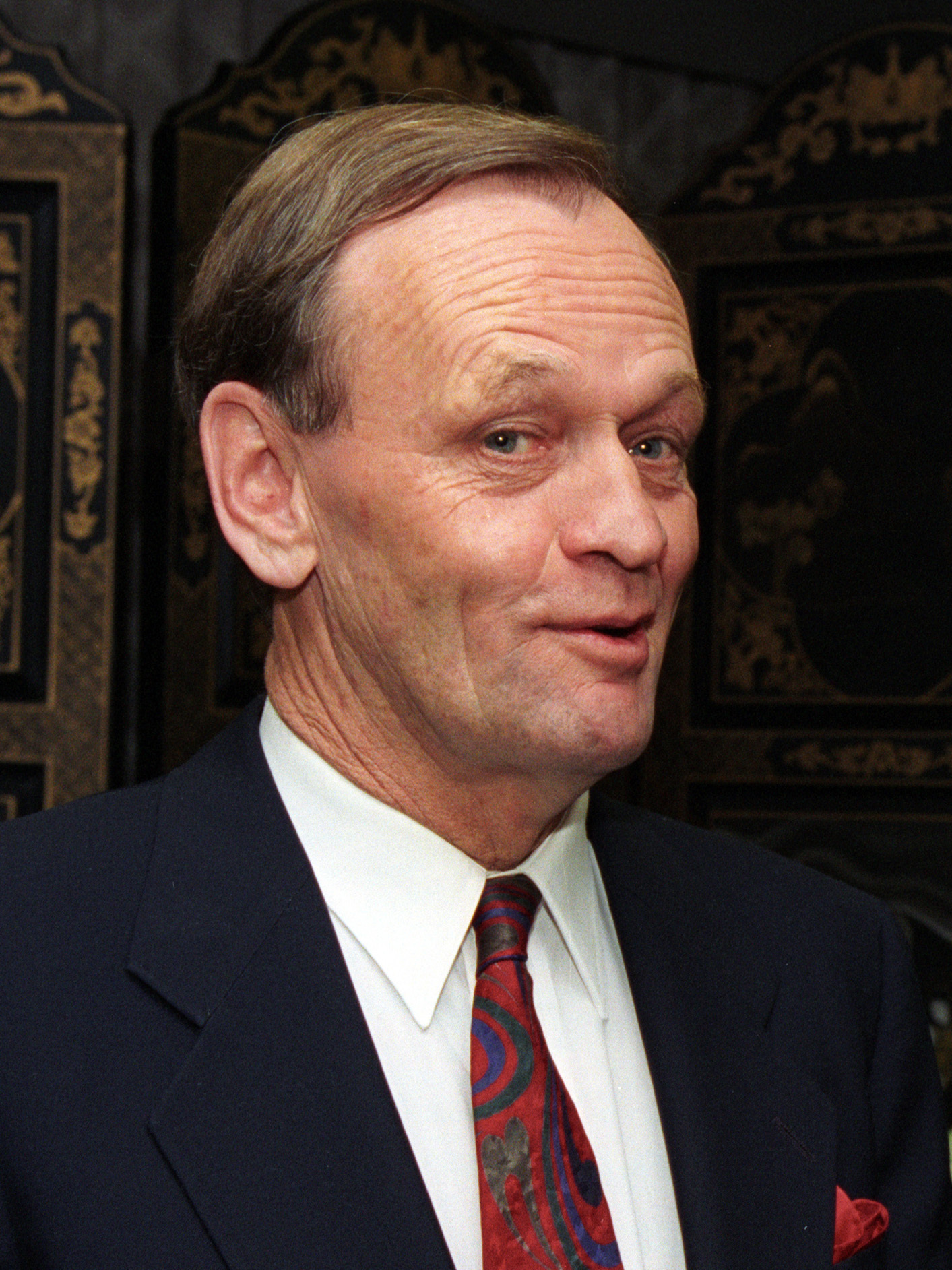
Jean Chrétien in 1993.

This article is the Electoral history of Jean Chrétien, the twentieth Prime Minister of Canada. Chrétien served as prime minister from November 4, 1993 to December 13, 2003, having won three general elections.

A liberal, Chrétien served three terms as prime minister (1993 to 2003). Chrétien led the Liberal Party of Canada in three general elections, winning back to back majority governments (1993, 1997, and 2000). He was the first Liberal prime minister to do so since Prime Minister Sir Wilfrid Laurier, in 1900, 1904, and 1908.

Chrétien stood for election to the House of Commons of Canada twelve times and was elected each time (eleven general elections and one by-election). He served continuously in the House from 1963 to 1986, when he resigned over disagreements with Liberal leader John Turner. After winning the Liberal leadership in 1990, he re-entered the Commons by a by-election, and was re-elected three more times, until he retired in 2004.

Chrétien stood for election as leader of the Liberal Party twice. He lost in 1984 to Turner, but he won in 1990, succeeding Turner as Liberal leader, and then decisively defeated Prime Minister Kim Campbell in the 1993 election.

Chrétien announced his retirement from politics in 2003 and was succeeded as prime minister and leader of the Liberal Party by Paul Martin.

== Summary ==
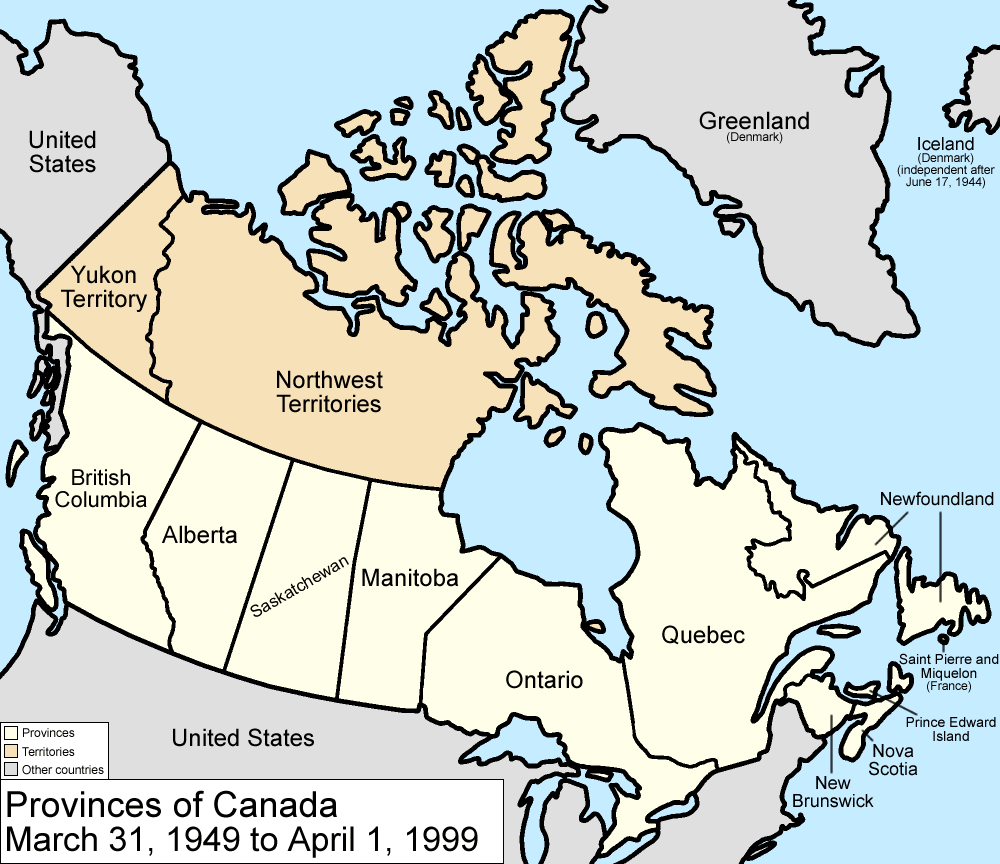
Canada had ten provinces and two territories at the beginning of Chrétien's term as Prime Minister.

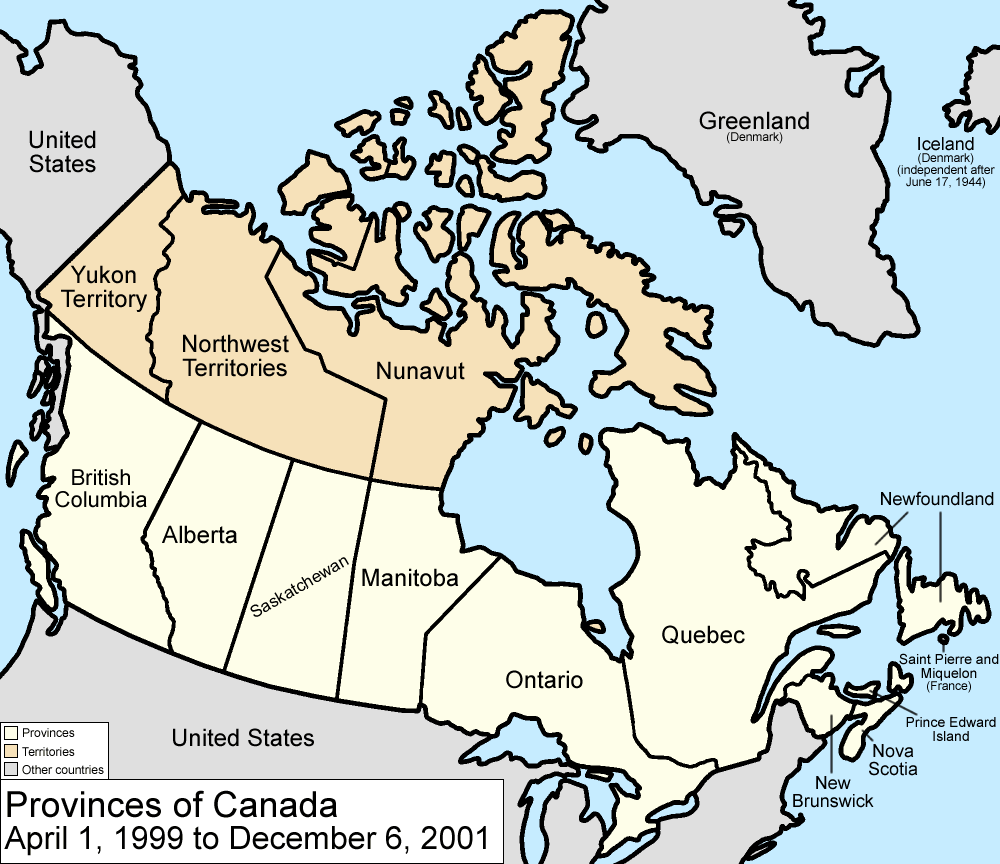
Canada had ten provinces and three territories at the end of Chrétien's term as Prime Minister.

Chrétien ranks fifth out of twenty-three prime ministers for time in office, serving one term of ten years and thirty-eight days.

Chrétien was the sixth of eight prime ministers from Quebec, the others being Sir John Abbott, Sir Wilfrid Laurier, Louis St. Laurent, Pierre Trudeau, Brian Mulroney, Paul Martin and Justin Trudeau. He was also the fourth of five francophone prime ministers, the others being Laurier, St. Laurent, Pierre Trudeau, and Justin Trudeau.

A lawyer, Chrétien got involved in politics at an early age. He was first elected to the House of Commons at age 30, in the federal election of 1963. He was appointed to Cabinet by Prime Minister Lester Pearson in 1967 and remained in Cabinet until 1984 under Prime Ministers Pierre Trudeau and John Turner (except for the short Clark government (1979–80)).

Chrétien led the Liberals in three general elections, winning each time. He is the first prime minister since Sir Wilfrid Laurier to win three back-to-back majority governments.

Chrétien stood for election to the House of Commons twelve times, all but once for the riding of Saint-Maurice, which included his home town of Shawinigan. He won more than a majority of the votes in all but two elections, and often had strong majorities. Chrétien was a Member of Parliament from 1963 to 1986, when he resigned over disagreements with Liberal leader John Turner. In 1990, after winning the Liberal leadership, he was elected to the Commons in a by-election for the riding of Beauséjour in New Brunswick. He was re-elected in Saint-Maurice in the next three elections, until he retired in 2004. His total service in Parliament was 35 years, 10 months, and 25 days.

Chrétien stood for election as leader of the Liberal Party twice, in 1984 and 1990. In 1984, he came in second, behind Turner. In 1990, after Turner's resignation, he won the leadership against his principal opponent, Paul Martin. Although Chrétien was successful in leading the party in three general elections, Martin and his supporters gradually undercut Chrétien's leadership, leading to Chrétien's retirement late in 2003. He was succeeded by Martin as prime minister and Liberal leader.

Chrétien remained a Member of Parliament until the 2004 general election, when he retired from politics.

== Federal general elections: 1993, 1997, and 2000 ==
Chrétien led the Liberal Party in three general elections: 1993, 1997 and 2000. He won majority governments each time.

=== Federal general election: 1993 ===
In his first general election as leader, Chrétien won a majority government and in the process reduced the Progressive Conservatives from a majority to just two seats in the Commons.

Canadian Federal Election, 1993 - Parties, Leaders, Seats Won and Popular Vote
Party	Leaders	Seats Won	Popular Vote
Liberal	Jean Chrétien^{1}	177	41.2%
Bloc Québécois	Lucien Bouchard^{2}	54	13.5%
Reform	Preston Manning	52	18.7%
New Democratic Party	Audrey McLaughlin	9	6.9%
Progressive Conservative	Kim Campbell^{3}	2	16.0%
Independent	–	1	0.7%
Total		295	97.0%^{4}
Sources: Library of Parliament – History of Federal Ridings since 1867

^{1} Leader of the Opposition when election was called; Prime Minister after election.
^{2} Leader of a third party when election was called; Leader of the Opposition after the election.
^{3} Prime Minister when election was called; not a Member of Parliament after the election.
^{4} Table does not include parties which received votes but did not elect any members.

=== Federal general election: 1997 ===
In his second general election, Chrétien again won a majority government, albeit with a reduced number of seats, against a fractured set of opposition parties.

Canadian Federal Election, 1997 - Parties, Leaders, Seats Won and Popular Vote
Party	Leaders	Seats Won	Popular Vote
Liberal	Jean Chrétien^{1}	155	38.5%
Reform	Preston Manning^{2}	60	19.4%
Bloc Québécois	Gilles Duceppe^{3}	44	10.7%
New Democratic Party	Alexa McDonough	21	11.1%
Progressive Conservative	Jean Charest	20	18.8%
Independent	–	1	0.5%
Total		301	99.0%^{4}
Sources: Library of Parliament – History of Federal Ridings since 1867

^{1} Prime Minister when election was called; Prime Minister after election.
^{2} Leader of a third party when election was called; Leader of the Opposition after the election.
^{3} Leader of the Opposition when election was called; leader of a third party after the election.
^{4} Table does not include parties which received votes but did not elect any members.

=== Federal general election: 2000 ===
In his third general election, Chrétien won another majority government with an increased number of seats, against a number of opposition parties.

Canadian Federal Election, 2000 - Parties, Leaders, Seats Won and Popular Vote
Party	Leaders	Seats Won	Popular Vote
Liberal	Jean Chrétien^{1}	172	40.9%
Canadian Alliance	Stockwell Day^{2}	66	25.5%
Bloc Québécois	Gilles Duceppe	38	10.7%
New Democratic Party	Alexa McDonough	13	8.5%
Progressive Conservative	Joe Clark	12	12.2%
Total		301	97.8%^{3}
Sources: Library of Parliament – History of Federal Ridings since 1867

^{1} Prime Minister when election was called; Prime Minister after election.
^{2} Leader of the Opposition when election was called; Leader of the Opposition after the election.
^{3} Table does not include parties which received votes but did not elect any members.

== Federal constituency elections: 1963 to 1984; 1990 to 2000 ==
Chrétien stood for election to the House of Commons twelve times. He was elected each time, often with substantial majorities.

=== 1963 Federal Election: Saint-Maurice—Laflèche ===
Federal Election, 1963: Saint-Maurice—Laflèche, Quebec
Party	Candidate	Popular Vote	%
Liberal	Yes Jean Chrétien	16,358	45.7%
Social Credit	X Gérard Lamy	14,414	40.3%
Progressive Conservative	Bruno Pellerin	3,018	8.4%
New Democratic Party	Martial La Forest	1,983	5.5%
Total		35,773	99.9%^{1}
Source: Library of Parliament – History of Federal Ridings since 1867: Saint-Maurice—Laflèche

Yes Elected.
X Incumbent.
^{1} Rounding error.

=== 1965 Federal Election: Saint-Maurice—Laflèche ===
Federal Election, 1965: Saint-Maurice—Laflèche, Quebec
Party	Candidate	Popular Vote	%
Liberal	Yes X Jean Chrétien	14,395	44.1%
Ralliement créditiste	Alphonse Poulin	7,429	22.8%
New Democratic Party	C. Liddle	5,669	17.4%
Progressive Conservative	Louis Lizotte	5,115	15.7%
Total		32,608	100.0%
Source: Library of Parliament – History of Federal Ridings since 1867: Saint-Maurice—Laflèche

Yes Elected.
X Incumbent.

The riding of Saint-Maurice—Laflèche was abolished in the re-distribution of 1966.

=== 1968 Federal Election: Saint-Maurice ===
Federal Election, 1968: Saint-Maurice, Quebec
Party	Candidate	Popular Vote	%
Liberal	Yes X Jean Chrétien	13,895	44.5%
Ralliement créditiste	Alphonse Poulin	12,198	39.1%
Progressive Conservative	Guy Germain	4,570	14.6%
New Democratic Party	Jean-Guy LaLancette	550	1.8%
Total		31,213	100.0%
Source: Library of Parliament – History of Federal Ridings since 1867: Saint-Maurice

Yes Elected.
X Incumbent.

=== 1972 Federal Election: Saint-Maurice ===
Federal Election, 1972: Saint-Maurice, Quebec
Party	Candidate	Popular Vote	%
Liberal	Yes X Jean Chrétien	19,840	56.7%
Social Credit	Guy Germain	11,363	32.5%
Progressive Conservative	Antonio Genest	2,227	6.4%
New Democratic Party	Robert McLeod	1,032	2.9%
Non-affiliated	Pierre Drolet	552	1.6%
Total		35,014	100.1%^{1}
Source: Library of Parliament – History of Federal Ridings since 1867: Saint-Maurice

Yes Elected.
X Incumbent.
^{1} Rounding error.

=== 1974 Federal Election: Saint-Maurice ===
Federal Election, 1974: Saint-Maurice, Quebec
Party	Candidate	Popular Vote	%
Liberal	Yes X Jean Chrétien	20,465	65.3%
Social Credit	Antonio Genest	5,471	17.4%
Progressive Conservative	Richard Durand	3,501	11.2%
New Democratic Party	Claude De Carufel	1,442	4.6%
Non-affiliated	Pierre Rousseau	482	1.5%
Total		31,361	100.0%
Source: Library of Parliament – History of Federal Ridings since 1867: Saint-Maurice

Yes Elected.
X Incumbent.

=== 1979 Federal Election: Saint-Maurice ===
Federal Election, 1979: Saint-Maurice, Quebec
Party	Candidate	Popular Vote	%
Liberal	Yes X Jean Chrétien	27,243	71.1%
Social Credit	Pierre-André Hamel	6,837	17.8%
Progressive Conservative	Roger Armand Charbonneau	2,795	7.3%
New Democratic Party	Robert Deschamps	952	2.5%
Union populaire	Pierre Chénard	351	0.9%
Marxist–Leninist	Normand Beaudoin	160	0.4%
Total		38,338	100.0%
Source: Library of Parliament – History of Federal Ridings since 1867: Saint-Maurice

Yes Elected.
X Incumbent.

=== 1980 Federal Election: Saint-Maurice ===
Federal Election, 1980: Saint-Maurice, Quebec
Party	Candidate	Popular Vote	%
Liberal	Yes X Jean Chrétien	27,356	76.7%
Progressive Conservative	Roger Armand Charbonneau	2,516	7.1%
Social Credit	Normand LaFrenière	2,369	6.6%
New Democratic Party	Edgar Paquette	1,963	5.5%
Rhinoceros	J. F. le Calife De Vernal	1,206	3.4%
Union populaire	Lionel C. LaPorte	161	0.5%
Marxist–Leninist	Normand Beaudoin	95	0.3%
Total		35,666	100.1%^{1}
Source: Library of Parliament – History of Federal Ridings since 1867: Saint-Maurice

Yes Elected.
X Incumbent.
^{1} Rounding error.

=== 1984 Federal Election: Saint-Maurice ===
Federal Election, 1984: Saint-Maurice, Quebec
Party	Candidate	Popular Vote	%
Liberal	Yes X Jean Chrétien	24,050	58.9%
Progressive Conservative	Roger Armand Charbonneau	14,468	35.4%
New Democratic Party	Danielle Delbeque	1,433	3.5%
Parti nationaliste du Québec	Alain Déry	892	2.2%
Total		40,843	100.0%
Source: Library of Parliament – History of Federal Ridings since 1867: Saint-Maurice

Yes Elected.
X Incumbent.

Note: Chrétien resigned his seat effective February 27, 1986.

=== 1990 Federal By-Election: Beauséjour ===
The incumbent, Fernand Robichaud, resigned his seat on September 24, 1990, after Chrétien was elected party leader, to allow Chrétien an opportunity to enter the House of Commons.

Federal By-election, December 10, 1990: Beauséjour, New Brunswick
Party	Candidate	Popular Vote	%
Liberal	Yes Jean Chrétien	17,332	51.5%
New Democratic Party	Guy Cormier	12,587	37.4%
Confederation of Regions	Margie Bowes-Legood	2,783	8.3%
Independent	Alonzo LeBlanc	450	1.3%
Christian Heritage	May Boudreau-Padersen	286	0.8%
Rhinoceros	Bryan Gold	246	0.7%
Total		33,684	100.0%
Source: Library of Parliament – History of Federal Ridings since 1867: Beauséjour

Yes Elected.

=== 1993 Federal Election: Saint-Maurice ===
Federal Election, 1993: Saint-Maurice, Quebec
Party	Candidate	Popular Vote	%
Liberal	Yes Jean Chrétien	25,200	54.1%
Bloc Québécois	Claude Rompré	18,896	40.5%
Progressive Conservative	Pauline B. Daneault	1,909	4.1%
Natural Law	Christian Simard	372	0.8%
New Democratic Party	Robert Des Champs	236	0.5%
Total		46,613	100.0%
Source: Library of Parliament – History of Federal Ridings since 1867: Saint-Maurice

Yes Elected.

=== 1997 Federal Election: Saint-Maurice ===
Federal Election, 1997: Saint-Maurice, Quebec
Party	Candidate	Popular Vote	%
Liberal	Yes X Jean Chrétien	22,266	47.3%
Bloc Québécois	Yves Duhaime	20,664	43.9%
Progressive Conservative	Denis Vincent	3,657	7.8%
New Democratic Party	Eric Hébert	489	1.0%
Total		47,076	100.0%
Source: Library of Parliament – History of Federal Ridings since 1867: Saint-Maurice

Yes Elected.
X Incumbent.

=== 2000 Federal Election: Saint-Maurice ===
Federal Election, 2000: Saint-Maurice, Quebec
Party	Candidate	Popular Vote	%
Liberal	Yes X Jean Chrétien	23,345	54.1%
Bloc Québécois	François Marchand	16,821	39.0%
Canadian Alliance	Jean-Guy Mercier	1,461	3.4%
Progressive Conservative	Pierre Blais	966	2.2%
New Democratic Party	Raymond Chase	359	0.8%
Communist	Sylvain Archambault	223	0.5%
Total		43,175	100.0%
Source: Library of Parliament – History of Federal Ridings since 1867: Saint-Maurice

Yes Elected.
X Incumbent.

== Liberal Party Leadership Conventions: 1984 and 1990 ==
Chrétien contested the Liberal leadership twice. He lost in 1984 to Turner, who then led the Liberal party in the next two general elections. Turner retired after the loss in the 1988 general election, and Chrétien won the leadership convention held in 1990.

=== 1984 Leadership Convention ===
Trudeau announced his retirement early in 1984. Chrétien entered the leadership election but lost on the second ballot to Turner.

Liberal Party Leadership Convention, June 16, 1984 Voting results by ballot
Candidate	First Ballot		Second Ballot	
Candidate	Votes cast	%	Votes cast	%
John Turner	1,593	46.4%	1,862	54.4%
Jean Chrétien	1,067	31.1%	1,368	40.0%
Don Johnston	278	8.1%	192	5.6%
John Roberts	185; Withdrew after first ballot.	5.4%	–	–
Mark MacGuigan	135; Withdrew after first ballot.	3.9%	–	–
John Munro	93; Withdrew after first ballot.	2.7%	–	–
Eugene Whelan	84; Eliminated after first ballot.	2.4%	–	–
Total	3,435	100.0%	3,422	100.0%
Source: CPAC – 1984 Liberal Convention

=== 1990 Leadership Convention ===
Following the Liberal defeat in the 1988 general election, Turner announced his retirement. At the leadership convention held in 1990, Chrétien won on the first ballot, defeating his principal opponent, Paul Martin.

Liberal Leadership Convention, June 23, 1990 Voting results by ballot
Candidate	First Ballot	
Candidate	Votes cast	%
Jean Chrétien	2,652	56.9%
Paul Martin	1,176	25.2%
Sheila Copps	499	10.7%
Tom Wappel	267	5.7%
John Nunziata	64	1.4%
Total	4,658	99.9%^{1}
Source: CPAC – 1990 Liberal Leadership Convention

^{1} Rounding error.

== See also ==
- Electoral history of Kim Campbell – Chrétien's predecessor as prime minister.
- Electoral history of John Turner – Chrétien's predecessor as leader of the Liberal Party.
- Electoral history of Paul Martin – Chrétien's successor as leader of the Liberal Party and as prime minister.
