= Electoral history of Pierre Poilievre =

Elections featuring Canadian politician

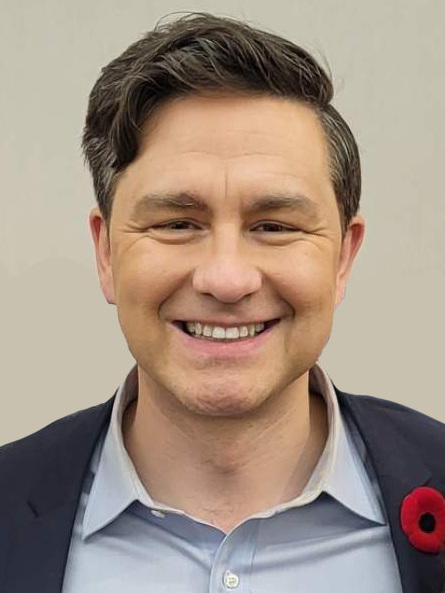
Poilievre in an interview

Pierre Poilievre is a Canadian politician who has been the leader of the Conservative Party of Canada since September 10, 2022 and leader of the Official Opposition since August 18, 2025.

First elected as a member of Parliament in the 2004 Canadian federal election, Poilievre represented the riding of Carleton until his 2025 election loss. He now represents the riding of Battle River—Crowfoot, following his 2025 by-election victory.

== Overview ==
Electoral history of Pierre Poilievre — Federal general elections
Year	Party	Votes			Seats		Position
Year	Party	Total	%	±%	Total	±	Position
2025	Conservative	8,113,550	41.28	+7.6	144 / 343	+24	Official Opposition

Electoral history of Pierre Poilievre — Federal constituency elections
Year	Type	Riding	Party	Votes for Poilievre				Result	Swing
Year	Type	Riding	Party	Total	%	P.	±%	Result	Swing
2004	General election	Nepean—Carleton	Conservative	30,420	45.66	1st	-7.69 (Note: Calculated from the combined percentages of the Canadian Alliance and Progressive Conservative candidates in the 2000 federal election.)	Elected	Gain
2006	General election	Nepean—Carleton	Conservative	39,260	54.69	1st	+9.03	Elected	Hold
2008	General election	Nepean—Carleton	Conservative	39,915	55.84	1st	+1.15	Elected	Hold
2011	General election	Nepean—Carleton	Conservative	43,477	54.45	1st	-1.39	Elected	Hold
2015	General election	Carleton	Conservative	27,762	46.86	1st	-14.81	Elected	Hold (Note: Notional hold from 2011 redistributed results.)
2019	General election	Carleton	Conservative	32,147	46.35	1st	-0.51	Elected	Hold
2021	General election	Carleton	Conservative	35,356	49.89	1st	+3.55	Elected	Hold
2025	General election	Carleton	Conservative	39,333	45.70	2nd	-6.16	Lost	Gain (Note: Notional gain from 2021 redistributed results.)
2025	By-election	Battle River—Crowfoot	Conservative	41,308	80.86	1st	-1.98	Elected	Hold

Electoral history of Pierre Poilievre — party leadership elections
Year	Party	Votes	%	Pts	P.	Result
2022	Conservative Party of Canada	295,285	70.70%	22,993.42	1st	Won

== Federal general elections ==
Poilievre led the Conservative Party in one general election. He lost the 2025 election to the Liberal Party led by Mark Carney.

=== Federal general election, 2025 ===
In his first general election as a party leader, Poilievre lost.

Canadian Federal Election, 2025 - Parties, Leaders, Seats Won and Popular Vote
Party	Leaders	Seats Won	Popular Vote
Liberal	Mark Carney^{1}	169	43.8%
Conservative	Pierre Poilievre^{2}	144	41.3%
Bloc Québécois	Yves-François Blanchet	22	6.3%
New Democratic	Jagmeet Singh	7	6.3%
Green	Elizabeth May & Jonathan Pedneault	1	1.3%
Total		343	98.9%^{3}

^{1} Prime Minister when election was called; Prime Minister after election
^{2} Leader of the Opposition when election was called; not a Member of Parliament after the election.

== Federal constituency elections ==
=== Federal election, 2004: Nepean—Carleton ===
2004 Canadian federal election: Nepean–Carleton
Party	Candidate	Votes	%	±%
Conservative	Pierre Poilievre	30,420	45.7	
Liberal	David Pratt	26,684	40.1	
New Democratic	Phil Brown	6,072	9.1	
Green	Chris Walker	2,886	4.3	
Marijuana	Brad Powers	561	0.8	
Total valid votes		66,848		
Turnout		75.1	%	

=== Federal election, 2006: Nepean—Carleton ===
2006 Canadian federal election: Nepean–Carleton
Party	Candidate	Votes	%	±%
Conservative	Pierre Poilievre	39,512	55.0	
Liberal	Michael Gaffney	20,111	28.0	
New Democratic	Laurel Gibbons	8,274	11.5	
Green	Lori Gadzala	3,976	5.5	
Total valid votes		72,089		
Turnout		75.8	%	

=== Federal election, 2008: Nepean—Carleton ===
2008 Canadian federal election: Nepean–Carleton
Party	Candidate	Votes	%	±%
Conservative	Pierre Poilievre	39,921	55.8	
Liberal	Ed Mahfouz	16,743	23.4	
Green	Lori Gadzala	7,880	11.0	
New Democratic	Phil Brown	6,946	9.7	
Total valid votes		71,490		
Turnout		69.4	%	

=== Federal election, 2011: Nepean—Carleton ===
2011 Canadian federal election: Nepean–Carleton
Party	Candidate	Votes	%	±%
Conservative	Pierre Poilievre	43,428	54.42	
Liberal	Ryan Keon	20,146	25.25	
New Democratic	Ric Dagenais	12,955	16.24	
Green	Jean-Luc Cooke	3,266	4.09	
Total valid votes		79,795		
Turnout		–	%	

=== Federal election, 2015: Carleton ===
2015 Canadian federal election: Carleton
Party	Candidate	Votes	%	±%	Expenditures
Conservative	Pierre Poilievre	27,762	46.86	−14.81	$166,805.35
Liberal	Chris Rodgers	25,913	43.74	+22.88	$101,336.54
New Democratic	KC Larocque	3,632	6.13	−7.22	$17,692.44
Green	Deborah Coyne	1,932	3.26	−0.86	$15,632.31
Total valid votes/expense limit		59,239	100.00		$206,141.87
Total rejected ballots		196	0.33	–	
Turnout		59,435	80.95	–	
Eligible voters		73,418			
Conservative notional hold		Swing		−18.84	
Source(s) Elections Canada – Confirmed candidates for Carleton, 30 September 2015; Elections Canada – Preliminary Election Expenses Limits for Candidates

=== Federal election, 2019: Carleton ===
2019 Canadian federal election: Carleton
Party	Candidate	Votes	%	±%	Expenditures
Conservative	Pierre Poilievre	32,147	46.35	−0.51	$95,365.47
Liberal	Chris Rodgers	26,518	38.23	−5.51	$106,000.32
New Democratic	Kevin Hua	6,479	9.34	+3.21	$2,169.60
Green	Gordon Kubanek	3,423	4.94	+1.68	$5,330.23
People's	Alain Musende	792	1.14	–	none listed
Total valid votes/expense limit		69,359	100		
Total rejected ballots		408	0.60	+0.27	
Turnout		67,767	77.18	−3.77	
Eligible voters		87,807			
Conservative hold		Swing		+2.50	
Source: Elections Canada

=== Federal election, 2021: Carleton ===
2021 Canadian federal election: Carleton
Party	Candidate	Votes	%	±%	Expenditures
Conservative	Pierre Poilievre	35,356	49.9	+3.55	$108,590.73
Liberal	Gustave Roy	24,298	34.3	−3.93	$91,061.91
New Democratic	Kevin Hua	8,164	11.5	+2.16	$3,138.40
People's	Peter Crawley	1,728	2.4	+1.26	$1,053.55
Green	Nira Dookeran	1,327	1.9	−3.04	$2,403.07
Total valid votes/expense limit		70,873	99.37	—	$122,996.20
Total rejected ballots		447	0.63	+0.03	
Turnout		71,320	74.57	−2.61	
Eligible voters		95,639			
Conservative hold		Swing		+3.74	
Source: Elections Canada

=== Federal election, 2025: Carleton ===
2025 Canadian federal election: Carleton
Party	Candidate	Votes	%	±%
Liberal	Bruce Fanjoy	43,846	50.95	+19.09
Conservative	Pierre Poilievre	39,333	45.70	−6.15
New Democratic	Beth Prokaska	1,221	1.42	−9.95
Green	Mark Watson	561	0.65	−1.49
United	Karen Bourdeau	112	0.13	N/A
Canadian Future	Shawn MacEachern	63	0.07	N/A
Independent	Lorant Polya	57	0.07	
Independent	Scott Falkingham	45	0.05	
Independent	Sana Ahmad	41	0.05	
Independent	Pierre Gauthier	38	0.04	
Marijuana	Danny Légaré	37	0.04	N/A
Independent	Guillaume Paradis	37	0.04	
Independent	Dan Kyung	35	0.04	
Rhinoceros	Sébastien CoRhino	31	0.04	N/A
Independent	Sarah Burke	27	0.03	
Independent	Mark Moutter	23	0.03	
Independent	David Zhu	21	0.02	
Independent	Charlie Currie	20	0.02	
Independent	John Dale	20	0.02	
Independent	Euan Fraser Tait	18	0.02	
Independent	John Boylan	17	0.02	
Independent	Mélodie Anderson	16	0.02	
Independent	Alex Banks	16	0.02	
Independent	Michael Bednarski	15	0.02	
Independent	David Nguyen	15	0.02	
Independent	Sophie Bearden	14	0.02	
Independent	Seyed Hosseini Lavasani	13	0.02	
No affiliation	Jeani Boudreault	12	0.01	
Independent	Alexandra Engering	12	0.01	
Independent	Lajos Polya	12	0.01	
No affiliation	Darcy Vanderwater	12	0.01	
Independent	Jenny Cartwright	11	0.01	
Independent	Jeffrey Goodman	11	0.01	
Independent	Donald McKay	11	0.01	
Independent	Daniel Stuckless	11	0.01	
Independent	Maria Gabriel	10	0.01	
No affiliation	Laina Kohler	10	0.01	
Independent	Charles Lemieux	10	0.01	
Independent	Marthalee Aykroyd	9	0.01	
Independent	Ryan Huard	9	0.01	
Independent	Sarah Thompson	9	0.01	
Independent	Alain Bourgault	8	0.01	
Independent	Daniel Gagnon	8	0.01	
Independent	Robert Harris	8	0.01	
Independent	Andrea Hollinger	8	0.01	
Independent	Connie Lukawski	8	0.01	
Independent	John Francis O'Flynn	8	0.01	
Independent	Peter Gorman	7	0.01	
Independent	Julian Selody	7	0.01	
Independent	Michal Wieczorek	7	0.01	
Independent	Line Bélanger	6	0.01	
Independent	Blake Hamilton	6	0.01	
Independent	Loren Hicks	6	0.01	
No affiliation	Alexander Lein	6	0.01	
Independent	Agnieszka Marszalek	6	0.01	
Independent	Hakim Sheriff	6	0.01	
Independent	Tetia Bayoro	5	0.01	
Independent	David Cherniak	5	0.01	
Independent	Kevin Krisa	5	0.01	
Independent	Alain Lamontagne	5	0.01	
Independent	Winston Neutel	5	0.01	
Independent	Lény Painchaud	5	0.01	
Independent	Elliot Wand	5	0.01	
Independent	Dante Camarena Jimenez	4	0.00	
Independent	Jaël Champagne Gareau	4	0.00	
Independent	Gerrit Dogger	4	0.00	
Independent	Gregory Gillis	4	0.00	
No affiliation	Christopher Navarro-Canseco	4	0.00	
Independent	Lanna Palsson	4	0.00	
Independent	Spencer Rocchi	4	0.00	
Independent	Patrick Strzalkowski	4	0.00	
No affiliation	Manon Marie Lili Desbiens	3	0.00	
Independent	Artem Gudkov	3	0.00	
No affiliation	Kerri Hildebrandt	3	0.00	
Independent	Trevor Holsworth	3	0.00	
No affiliation	Krzysztof Krzywinski	3	0.00	
Independent	Samuel Lafontaine	3	0.00	
Independent	Roger Sherwood	3	0.00	
Independent	Yogo Shimada	3	0.00	
Independent	Michael Skirzynski	3	0.00	
Independent	Julie St-Amand	3	0.00	
Independent	Daniel Graham	2	0.00	
Independent	Zornitsa Halacheva	2	0.00	
Independent	Anthony Hamel	2	0.00	
Independent	Demetrios Karavas	2	0.00	
Independent	Sheri Oberman	2	0.00	
Independent	Wallace Richard Rowat	2	0.00	
Independent	Pascal St-Amand	2	0.00	
Independent	Benjamin Teichman	2	0.00	
Independent	Joseph Maw	1	0.00	
No affiliation	Ysack Dupont	0	0.00	
Total valid votes		86,060	99.31	
Total rejected ballots		595	0.69	+0.14
Turnout		86,655	81.36	+5.54
Eligible voters		106,504		
Liberal notional gain from Conservative		Swing		+12.62
Source: Elections Canada

=== Federal by-election, 2025: Battle River—Crowfoot ===
Canadian federal by-election, August 18, 2025: Battle River—Crowfoot Resignation of Damien Kurek
Party	Candidate	Votes	%	±%
Conservative	Pierre Poilievre	41,308	80.86	-1.98
Independent	Bonnie Critchley	5,018	9.82	–
Liberal	Darcy Spady	2,095	4.10	-7.57
New Democratic	Katherine Swampy	1,061	2.08	-1.10
United	Grant Abraham	757	1.48	–
People's	Jonathan Bridges	138	0.27	-1.31
Green	Ashley MacDonald	116	0.23	-0.50
Libertarian	Michael Harris	103	0.20	–
Christian Heritage	Jeff Willerton	92	0.18	–
Independent	Sarah Spanier	49	0.10	–
Marijuana	Kenneth Kirk	40	0.08	–
Centrist	Ahmed Hassan	15	0.03	–
Independent	Bert William Westergard	11	0.02	–
Independent	Breccan Zimmer	11	0.02	–
Independent	Dillon Anderson	10	0.02	–
Independent	Nicole Betts	7	0.01	–
Independent	Nickolas Meuters-Murphy	7	0.01	–
Independent	Diane Prentice	7	0.01	–
Independent	Glen Armstrong	6	0.01	–
Independent	Caitlyn Baker	6	0.01	–
Independent	Lisa Parsons	6	0.01	–
Independent	Jason Buzzell	5	0.01	–
Independent	Jenny Cartwright	5	0.01	–
Independent	Deborah Chalmers	5	0.01	–
Independent	William Grant	5	0.01	–
Independent	Paul Jones	5	0.01	–
Independent	Brennen Perry	5	0.01	–
Independent	Anthony Perullo	5	0.01	–
Independent	Myles René Laurent St. Pierre	5	0.01	–
Independent	Fraser Anderson	4	0.01	–
Independent	Rebecca Boyce	4	0.01	–
Independent	Pierre Gauthier	4	0.01	–
Independent	Preston Hoff	4	0.01	–
Independent	Mark Ruthenberg	4	0.01	–
Independent	Ceilidh Stewart	4	0.01	–
Independent	Danica Boe	3	0.01	–
Independent	Aaron Bowles	3	0.01	–
Independent	Sarah Burke	3	0.01	–
Independent	David Cherniak	3	0.01	–
Independent	John Dale	3	0.01	–
Independent	Emily Goose	3	0.01	–
Independent	Corey Hales	3	0.01	–
Independent	Grace Pender	3	0.01	–
Independent	Noah Reid	3	0.01	–
Independent	David Sader	3	0.01	–
Independent	Molly Sun	3	0.01	–
Independent	Nicola Zoghbi	3	0.01	–
Independent	Alex Banks	2	0.00	–
Independent	Stacy Lynn Billingsley	2	0.00	–
Independent	Marten Borch	2	0.00	–
Independent	Jakeb Brown	2	0.00	–
Independent	Annelies Cooper	2	0.00	–
Independent	Hannah DeWolfe	2	0.00	–
Independent	Elizabeth Dupuis	2	0.00	–
Independent	Kenneth Durham	2	0.00	–
Independent	Michael Dyck	2	0.00	–
Independent	Katherine Dyson	2	0.00	–
Independent	Michael Louis Fitzgerald	2	0.00	–
Independent	Daniel Gagnon	2	0.00	–
Independent	Kerri Hildebrandt	2	0.00	–
Independent	Elsie Kipp	2	0.00	–
Independent	Chris Kowalchuk	2	0.00	–
Independent	Johnson Hon Wa Lee	2	0.00	–
Independent	Maria Light	2	0.00	–
Independent	Derek Adam MacKay	2	0.00	–
Independent	Jeffrey McLean	2	0.00	–
Independent	Riley Moss	2	0.00	–
Independent	Kimberley Nugent	2	0.00	–
Independent	Alexander Panchuk	2	0.00	–
Independent	Yagya Parihar	2	0.00	–
Independent	Samuel Pignedoli	2	0.00	–
Independent	Lorant Polya	2	0.00	–
Independent	Jayson Roy	2	0.00	–
Independent	Adam Smith	2	0.00	–
Independent	Patrick Strzalkowski	2	0.00	–
Independent	Callan Wassenaar	2	0.00	–
Independent	Jeremy Wedel	2	0.00	–
Independent	Hazel Westwood	2	0.00	–
Independent	Nicholas Ashmore	1	0.00	–
Independent	Michael Bednarski	1	0.00	–
Independent	Lilia Boisvert	1	0.00	–
Independent	Alain Bourgault	1	0.00	–
Independent	Eva Bowering	1	0.00	–
Independent	Joshua Brauner	1	0.00	–
Independent	Alexandre Brochu	1	0.00	–
Independent	Chun Chen	1	0.00	–
Independent	Shawn Clendining	1	0.00	–
Independent	Lindsay Elaine Shyla Colosimo	1	0.00	–
Independent	Dylan Colquhoun	1	0.00	–
Independent	Jayson Cowan	1	0.00	–
Independent	Michael Davis	1	0.00	–
Independent	Geneviève Dorval	1	0.00	–
Independent	Jordan Drew	1	0.00	–
Independent	Murray Dunham	1	0.00	–
Independent	Eric Duong	1	0.00	–
Independent	Mark Eccleston	1	0.00	–
Independent	Jeremy Edwards	1	0.00	–
Independent	Allison Fanjoy	1	0.00	–
Independent	Gabriel Finn	1	0.00	–
Independent	Hubert Fischer	1	0.00	–
Independent	Matthew Gillies	1	0.00	–
Independent	Peter Gorman	1	0.00	–
Independent	Jacqueline Grabowski	1	0.00	–
Independent	Andrew Guenther	1	0.00	–
Independent	Blake Hamilton	1	0.00	–
Independent	Jason Hodgson	1	0.00	–
Independent	Dakota Hourie	1	0.00	–
Independent	Uneeb Islam	1	0.00	–
Independent	Michael Jones	1	0.00	–
Independent	Richard Kenkel	1	0.00	–
Independent	Madison Kennedy	1	0.00	–
Independent	Abraham Lau	1	0.00	–
Independent	Charles Lemieux	1	0.00	–
Independent	Robert Marsden	1	0.00	–
Independent	Agnieszka Marszalek	1	0.00	–
Independent	Geoffrey Meens	1	0.00	–
Independent	Sophia Nguyen	1	0.00	–
Independent	Pascal Noël	1	0.00	–
Independent	Steve Oates	1	0.00	–
Independent	Lény Painchaud	1	0.00	–
Independent	Lanna Palsson	1	0.00	–
Independent	Céline Paquin	1	0.00	–
Independent	Meagan Roberge	1	0.00	–
Independent	Melanie Roberge	1	0.00	–
Independent	Mark Russell	1	0.00	–
Independent	Kayll Schaefer	1	0.00	–
Independent	Hakim Sheriff	1	0.00	–
Independent	Eric Shorten	1	0.00	–
Independent	Bradley Stewart	1	0.00	–
Independent	Mário Stocco	1	0.00	–
Independent	Faith Tabladillo	1	0.00	–
Independent	Alex Vallée	1	0.00	–
Independent	Dennis Vanmeer	1	0.00	–
Independent	Bryan Wang	1	0.00	–
Independent	Joshua Wong	1	0.00	–
Independent	Yao ZhangLi	1	0.00	–
Independent	David Zhu	1	0.00	–
Independent	Barry Zukewich	1	0.00	–
Independent	Marthalee Aykroyd	0	0.00	–
Independent	Line Bélanger	0	0.00	–
Independent	Michel Bélanger	0	0.00	–
Independent	Jeani Boudreault	0	0.00	–
Independent	Jeffery Brazeau	0	0.00	–
Independent	Bo Cai	0	0.00	–
Independent	Cameron Campos	0	0.00	–
Independent	Nicolas Champagne	0	0.00	–
Independent	Jaël Champagne Gareau	0	0.00	–
Independent	Claude Cordon Pichilla	0	0.00	–
Independent	Tristan Dell	0	0.00	–
Independent	Gerrit Dogger	0	0.00	–
Independent	Abel Erazo-Ibarra	0	0.00	–
Independent	Tracy Farber	0	0.00	–
Independent	Brian Farrenkopf	0	0.00	–
Independent	Thomas Fitzgerald	0	0.00	–
Independent	Connor Fullerton	0	0.00	–
Independent	Jordan Gerrard	0	0.00	–
Independent	Eric Gilmour	0	0.00	–
Independent	Laurie Goble	0	0.00	–
Independent	David Patrick Greene	0	0.00	–
Independent	Nicolette Gross	0	0.00	–
Independent	Kathleen Gudmundsson	0	0.00	–
Independent	Richard Haley	0	0.00	–
Independent	Kazimir Haykowsky	0	0.00	–
Independent	Iriella Hicks	0	0.00	–
Independent	Loren Hicks	0	0.00	–
Independent	Seyed Hosseini Lavasani	0	0.00	–
Independent	Glendyn Howse	0	0.00	–
Independent	Ryan Huard	0	0.00	–
Independent	Jack Jean-Louis	0	0.00	–
Independent	Derek Jouppi	0	0.00	–
Independent	Erich Jurgens	0	0.00	–
Independent	Elza Kephart	0	0.00	–
Independent	Dannielle Konkle	0	0.00	–
Independent	Solomon Krygier-Paine	0	0.00	–
Independent	Andrew Kulas	0	0.00	–
Independent	Samuel Lafontaine	0	0.00	–
Independent	Alain Lamontagne	0	0.00	–
Independent	Eric Laverdure	0	0.00	–
Independent	Jocelyn LeBlanc-Courchaine	0	0.00	–
Independent	Alexander Lein	0	0.00	–
Independent	Renée Lemieux	0	0.00	–
Independent	Jeffrey Leroux	0	0.00	–
Independent	Litma Kai Ching Leung	0	0.00	–
Independent	Cedric Ludlow	0	0.00	–
Independent	Jennifer Margaret Mackenzie-Miller	0	0.00	–
Independent	Nicolas Maltais	0	0.00	–
Independent	Kevin Manzano	0	0.00	–
Independent	Eric March	0	0.00	–
Independent	Devin McManus	0	0.00	–
Independent	Robert Melting Tallow	0	0.00	–
Independent	Joanne L Metters	0	0.00	–
Independent	Nicholas Mew	0	0.00	–
Independent	Mark Moutter	0	0.00	–
Independent	Rob Mumford	0	0.00	–
Independent	Molly Munn	0	0.00	–
Independent	Sam Nabi	0	0.00	–
Independent	John Francis O'Flynn	0	0.00	–
Independent	Clifford Pine	0	0.00	–
Independent	Brian Ramchandar	0	0.00	–
Independent	Spencer Rocchi	0	0.00	–
Independent	Wallace Richard Rowat	0	0.00	–
Independent	Barry Rueger	0	0.00	–
Independent	Chris Scrimes	0	0.00	–
Independent	Charles Douglas Sleep	0	0.00	–
Independent	Julie St-Amand	0	0.00	–
Independent	Pascal St-Amand	0	0.00	–
Independent	Andi Sweet	0	0.00	–
Independent	Corinne Unrau	0	0.00	–
Independent	Tyson Warner	0	0.00	–
Independent	Simon John Edwin Wedel	0	0.00	–
Independent	Michaiah Williams	0	0.00	–
Independent	Brian Wishart	0	0.00	–
Independent	Michael Wisniewski	0	0.00	–
Independent	Belinda Christine Young	0	0.00	–
Total valid votes		51,085	99.59	–
Total rejected ballots		211	0.41	-0.19
Turnout		51,296	59.83	-16.66
Eligible voters		85,736	–	
Conservative hold		Swing		–
Source: Elections Canada

== Party leadership elections ==
=== Conservative Party leadership election, 2022 ===
Pierre Poilievre won the 2022 Conservative Party leadership election on the first ballot.

Conservative Leadership Election, September 10, 2022 First and only ballot
Candidate	Votes cast		Points won	
Pierre Poilievre	295,285	70.70%	22,993.42	68.15%
Jean Charest	48,650	11.65%	5,421.62	16.07%
Leslyn Lewis	46,374	11.10%	3,269.54	9.69%
Roman Baber	22,381	5.36%	1,696.76	5.03%
Total	412,690	98.81%	33,737.99	98.94%
Sources: Conservative Party of Canada

== See also ==
- Electoral history of Mark Carney – Poilievre's principal opponent in the 2025 general election.
