= 11th Parliament of British Columbia =

The 11th Legislative Assembly of British Columbia sat from 1907 to 1909. The members were elected in the British Columbia general election held in February 1907. The British Columbia Conservative Party led by Richard McBride formed the government.

David McEwen Eberts served as speaker.

== Members of the 11th Parliament ==
The following members were elected to the assembly in 1907:

Member	Electoral district	Party	First elected / previously elected	No.# of term(s)
Harlan Carey Brewster	Alberni	Liberal	1907	1st term
Henry Esson Young	Atlin	Conservative	1903	2nd term
Harry Jones	Cariboo	Liberal	1903	2nd term
John MacKay Yorston	Cariboo	Liberal	1907	1st term
Charles William Munro	Chilliwhack	Liberal	1898	4th term
Henry George Parson	Columbia	Conservative	1907	1st term
Robert Grant	Comox	Conservative	1903	2nd term
William Henry Hayward	Cowichan	Conservative	1900, (Note: Esquimalt) 1907	2nd term*
James Horace King	Cranbrook	Liberal	1903	2nd term
John Oliver	Delta	Liberal	1900	3rd term
Richard McBride (Note: Elected in both Dewdney and Victoria; choosing to sit for Victoria)	Dewdney	Conservative	1898	4th term
William J. Manson (1907)	Dewdney	Conservative	1907	1st term
John Jardine	Esquimalt	Liberal	1907	1st term
William Roderick Ross	Fernie	Conservative	1903	2nd term
John McInnis	Grand Forks	Socialist	1907	1st term
George Ratcliffe Naden	Greenwood	Liberal	1907	1st term
Albert Edward McPhillips	The Islands	Conservative	1898, (Note: Victoria City) 1907	4th term*
Frederick John Fulton	Kamloops	Conservative	1900	3rd term
Neil Franklin MacKay	Kaslo	Conservative	1907	1st term
Mark Robert Eagleson	Lillooet	Liberal	1907	1st term
James Hurst Hawthornthwaite	Nanaimo City	Socialist	1901	3rd term
George Arthur Benjamin Hall	Nelson City	Liberal	1907	1st term
Parker Williams	Newcastle	Socialist	1903	2nd term
Thomas Gifford	New Westminster City	Conservative	1901	3rd term
Price Ellison	Okanagan	Conservative	1898	4th term
Thomas Taylor	Revelstoke	Conservative	1900	3rd term
Francis Lovett Carter-Cotton	Richmond	Conservative	1890, (Note: Vancouver City) 1903	5th term*
James Alexander MacDonald	Rossland City	Liberal	1903	2nd term
David McEwen Eberts	Saanich	Conservative	1890, (Note: Victoria) 1907	5th term*
Lytton Wilmot Shatford	Similkameen	Conservative	1903	2nd term
William Thomas Kergin	Skeena	Liberal	1907	1st term
William Hunter	Slocan	Conservative	1907	1st term
William John Bowser	Vancouver City	Conservative	1903	2nd term
James Ford Garden	Vancouver City	Conservative	1903	2nd term
Alexander Henry Boswell MacGowan	Vancouver City	Conservative	1903	2nd term
George Albert McGuire	Vancouver City	Conservative	1907	1st term
Robert Garnett Tatlow	Vancouver City	Conservative	1900	3rd term
Henry Frederick William Behnsen	Victoria City	Conservative	1907	1st term
Frederick Davey	Victoria City	Conservative	1907	1st term
Richard McBride	Victoria City	Conservative	1898	4th term
Henry Broughton Thomson	Victoria City	Conservative	1907	1st term
Stuart Alexander Henderson	Yale	Liberal	1903	2nd term
James Hargrave Schofield	Ymir	Conservative	1907	1st term

== Party standings ==
Affiliation	Members
Conservative	26
Liberal	13
Socialist	3
Total	42
Government Majority	10

== By-elections ==
By-elections were held for the following members appointed to the provincial cabinet, as was required at the time:

- Henry Esson Young, Provincial Secretary, acclaimed March 12, 1907
- William John Bowser, Attorney General, elected August 15, 1907
- Thomas Taylor, Minister of Public Works, elected January 20, 1909

By-elections were held to replace members for various other reasons:

Electoral district	Member elected	Party	Election date	Reason
Dewdney	William J. Manson	Conservative	April 17, 1907 (Note: Acclaimed)	R. McBride resigned seat; elected in both Victoria City and Dewdney
Nanaimo City	James Hurst Hawthornthwaite	Conservative	January 13, 1909	J.H. Hawthornthwaite resigned seat to contest federal election October 26, 1908
