= 1907 British Columbia general election =

Canadian provincial election

- February 2, 1907

42 seats to the 11th Legislative Assembly of British Columbia 23 seats needed for a majority
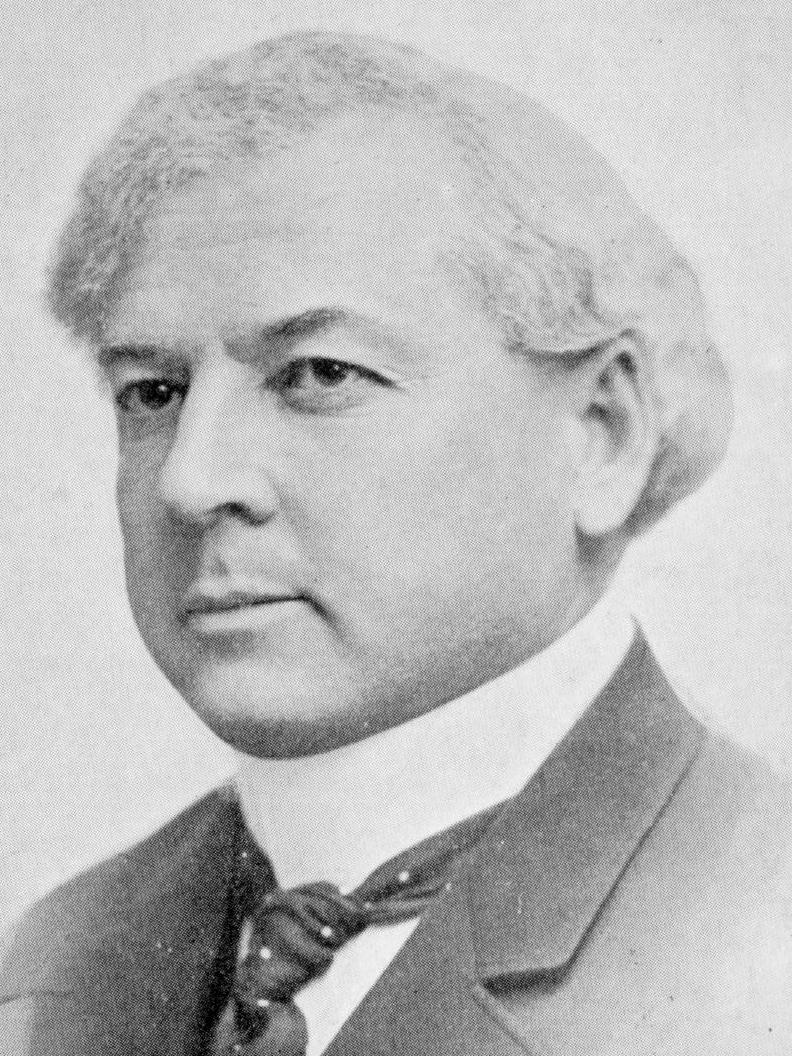
	First party	Second party	Third party
		LIB	SOC
Leader	Sir Richard McBride	James Alexander MacDonald	No leader
Party	Conservative	Liberal	Socialist
Leader since	1903	1903
Leader's seat	Dewdney	Rossland City
Seats before	22	17	2
Seats won	26	13	3
Seat change	▲4	▼4	▲1
Popular vote	30,781	23,481	5,603
Percentage	48.70%	37.15%	8.87%
Swing	▲2.27pp	▼0.63pp	▲0.91pp
Premier before election
Sir Richard McBride
Conservative
Premier
Sir Richard McBride
Conservative

The 1907 British Columbia general election was the eleventh general election for the Province of British Columbia, Canada. It was held to elect members of the Legislative Assembly of British Columbia. The election called on December 24, 1906, and held on February 2, 1907. The new legislature met for the first time on March 7, 1907.

The governing Conservative party won a second term in government, with almost half the popular vote, and a majority of the seats in the legislature, increasing its number of seats by 4 to 26.

The Liberal Party lost 4 seats in the legislature, despite winning about the same share of the popular vote that it had in the 1903 election.

The Socialist Party won one additional seat to bring its total to three.

== Results ==
Elections to the Legislative Assembly of British Columbia (1907)
Political party	Party leader	MLAs				Votes			
Political party	Party leader	Candidates	1903	1907	±	#	±	%	± (pp)
Conservative	Richard McBride	42	22	26	4▲	30,781	2,868▲	48.70%	2.27▲
Liberal	James Alexander MacDonald	40	17	13	4▼	23,481	766▲	37.15%	0.63▼
Socialist		20	2	3	1▲	5,603	816▲	8.87%	0.91▲
Canadian Labour (Note: Comparison is with combined totals of local Labour candidates in 1903)		6	1	–	1▼	2,495	1,926▼	3.95%	3.41▼
Independent Labour (Note: Described as Liberal-Labour candidates by the Conservative press, and no Liberal candidates were nominated in their districts. They were repudiated by Canadian Labour's Victoria branch.)		2	–	–	–	487	487▲	0.77%	New
Independent Socialist		1	–	–	–	211	211▲	0.33%	New
Independent		1	–	–	–	147	147▲	0.23%	New
Total		112	42	42		63,205		100.00%	

Seats and popular vote by party
Party	Seats	Votes	Change (pp)
█ Conservative	26 / 42	48.70%	2.27
█ Liberal	13 / 42	37.15%	-0.63
█ Socialist	3 / 42	8.87%	0.91
█ Labour	0 / 42	3.95%	-3.41
█ Other	0 / 42	1.33%	0.86

== Results by riding ==
The following MLAs were elected:

Alberni: Harlan Carey Brewster Atlin: Henry Esson Young Cariboo: Harry Jones Cariboo: John MacKay Yorston Chilliwhack: Charles William Munro Columbia: Henry George Parson Comox: Robert Grant Cowichan: William Henry Hayward Cranbrook: James Horace King Delta: John Oliver Dewdney: Richard McBride (Note: McBride also won a seat in Victoria. He renounced Dewdney, and William J. Manson (Con) would win in the subsequent byelection.) Esquimalt: John Jardine Fernie: William Roderick Ross Grand Forks: John McInnis	Greenwood: George Ratcliffe Naden The Islands: Albert Edward McPhillips Kamloops: Frederick John Fulton Kaslo: Neil Franklin MacKay Lillooet: Mark Robert Eagleson Nanaimo City: James Hurst Hawthornthwaite Nelson City: George Arthur Benjamin Hall Newcastle: Parker Williams New Westminster City: Thomas Gifford Okanagan: Price Ellison Revelstoke: Thomas Taylor Richmond: Francis Lovett Carter-Cotton Rossland City: James Alexander MacDonald Saanich: David McEwen Eberts	Similkameen: Lytton Wilmot Shatford Skeena: William Thomas Kergin Slocan: William Hunter Vancouver City: Charles William John Bowser Vancouver City: James Ford Garden Vancouver City: Alexander Henry Boswell MacGowan Vancouver City: George Albert McGuire Vancouver City: Robert Garnett Tatlow Victoria City: Henry Frederick William Behnsen Victoria City: Frederick Davey Victoria City: Richard McBride Victoria City: Henry Broughton Thomson Yale: Stuart Alexander Henderson Ymir: James Hargrave Schofield

=== Synopsis of results ===
Results by riding - 1907 British Columbia general election (single-member districts)
Riding	Winning party						Votes					
Name	1903	Party	Votes	Share	Margin #	Margin %	Con	Lib	Soc	C-Lab	Oth	Total
Alberni	Lib	Lib	236	48.86%	32	6.62%	204	236	43	–	–	483
Atlin (Note: Results are incomplete. Several polling places were unreported.)	Con	Con	78	62.90%	32	25.80%	78	46	–	–	–	124
Chilliwhack	Lib	Lib	331	51.64%	21	3.28%	310	331	–	–	–	641
Columbia	Lib	Con	254	56.57%	59	13.14%	254	195	–	–	–	449
Comox	Con	Con	372	56.02%	80	12.04%	372	292	–	–	–	664
Cowichan	Lib	Con	123	53.95%	18	7.90%	123	105	–	–	–	228
Cranbrook	Lib	Lib	473	44.54%	95	8.95%	378	473	–	–	211	1,062
Delta	Lib	Lib	430	62.23%	169	24.46%	261	430	–	–	–	691
Dewdney	Con	Con	384	61.44%	143	22.88%	384	241	–	–	–	625
Esquimalt	Con	Lib	297	58.58%	87	17.16%	210	297	–	–	–	507
Fernie	Con	Con	350	49.93%	65	9.27%	350	66	285	–	–	701
Grand Forks	Con	Soc	323	43.77%	68	9.22%	255	160	323	–	–	738
Greenwood	Lib	Lib	217	37.22%	27	4.63%	190	217	176	–	–	583
The Islands	Lib	Con	179	49.31%	6	1.65%	179	173	11	–	–	363
Kamloops	Con	Con	534	54.88%	95	9.76%	534	439	–	–	–	973
Kaslo	Con	Con	233	55.21%	44	10.42%	233	189	–	–	–	422
Lillooet	Con	Lib	123	51.68%	8	3.36%	115	123	–	–	–	238
Nanaimo City	Soc	Soc	455	50.22%	165	18.21%	161	290	455	–	–	906
Nelson City	Con	Lib	314	43.67%	5	0.69%	309	314	96	–	–	719
Newcastle	Soc	Soc	259	46.67%	62	11.17%	99	197	259	–	–	555
New Westminster City	Con	Con	675	49.31%	128	9.35%	675	547	–	147	–	1,369
Okanagan	Con	Con	893	54.85%	250	15.35%	893	643	92	–	–	1,628
Revelstoke	Con	Con	440	54.79%	171	21.29%	440	269	94	–	–	803
Richmond	Con	Con	417	48.04%	14	1.61%	417	403	48	–	–	868
Rossland City	Lib	Lib	241	45.90%	55	10.47%	186	241	98	–	–	525
Saanich	Lib	Con	275	51.69%	18	3.38%	275	257	–	–	–	532
Similkameen	Con	Con	298	56.55%	98	18.60%	298	200	29	–	–	527
Skeena	Con	Lib	188	61.44%	70	22.88%	118	188	–	–	–	306
Slocan	Lab	Con	193	49.11%	74	18.83%	193	119	81	–	–	393
Yale	Lib	Lib	289	58.27%	82	16.54%	207	289	–	–	–	496
Ymir	Con	Con	325	45.71%	86	12.10%	325	239	–	–	147	711

= open seat
= winning candidate was in previous Legislature
= incumbent had switched allegiance
= incumbency arose from byelection gain
= other incumbents renominated
= Independent Labour candidate

Results by riding - 1907 British Columbia general election (multiple-member districts)
Party	Cariboo			Vancouver City			Victoria City		
Party	Votes	Share	Change	Votes	Share	Change	Votes	Share	Change
Conservative	287	43.88%	-1.78%	15,503	51.38%	2.81%	5,965	47.54%	6.01%
Liberal	367	56.12%	1.78%	10,956	36.31%	10.23%	4,474	35.66%	-17.37%
Socialist	–	–	–	3,032	10.05%	0.91%	443	3.53%	-1.92%
Canadian Labour	–	–	–	682	2.26%	-12.81%	1,666	13.28%	13.28%
Socialist Labor	–	–	–	–	–	-1.14%	–	–	–
Total	654	100.00%		30,173	100.00%		12,548	100.00%	
Seats won	2			5			4		
Incumbents returned	1			4			–		
Seat change	–			–			4▼		

== See also ==
- List of British Columbia political parties
- Richard McBride
