= 9th Parliament of British Columbia =

Legislative assembly of British Columbia from 1900 to 1903

The 9th Legislative Assembly of British Columbia sat from 1900 to 1903. The members were elected in the British Columbia general election held in June 1900. James Dunsmuir served as Premier until he resigned in November 21, 1902. Dunsmuir was succeeded by Edward Gawler Prior, who was dismissed by the lieutenant governor for conflict of interest. Richard McBride became Premier in June 1903.

John Paton Booth served as speaker until his death in February 1902. Charles Edward Pooley succeeded Booth as speaker.

== Members of the 9th Parliament ==
The following members were elected to the assembly in 1900. This was the last election where political parties were not part of the official process, although a number of candidates declared party affiliations:

Member	Electoral district	Party	First elected / previously elected	No.# of term(s)
Alan Webster Neill	Alberni	Provincial (Note: Affiliated with the Provincial Party led by Francis Lovett Carter-Cotton)	1898	2nd term
Joseph Hunter	Cariboo	Opposition (Note: opposed to the Martin administration)	1871, 1890, (Note: Comox) 1900	4th term*
Samuel Augustus Rogers	Cariboo	Opposition	1890, 1900	3rd term*
Charles William Digby Clifford	Cassiar	Conservative/Opposition (Note: Candidate listed with differing affiliations depending on the source)	1898	2nd term
James Stables	Cassiar	Independent Government??	1900	1st term
Lewis Alfred Mounce	Comox	Opposition	1900	1st term
Charles Herbert Dickie	Cowichan	Independent/Conservative	1900	1st term
Wilmer Cleveland Wells	East Kootenay North	Independent/Provincial	1899	2nd term
Edwin Clarke Smith	East Kootenay South	Government (Note: Government candidates supported the Martin administration)	1900	1st term
William Henry Hayward	Esquimalt	Independent Opposition	1900	1st term
Charles Edward Pooley	Esquimalt	Opposition	1882	6th term
James Douglas Prentice	Lillooet East	Opposition/Provincial	1894, 1898	3rd term*
Alfred Wellington Smith	Lillooet West	Independent/Opposition	1889	5th term
Ralph Smith	Nanaimo City	Labour (Note: Endorsed by Nanaimo Trades and Labour Council)	1900	1st term
James Hurst Hawthornthwaite (1901)	Nanaimo City	Independent Labour	1901	1st term
John Cunningham Brown	New Westminster City	Government	1890, 1900	2nd term
Thomas Gifford (1901)	New Westminster City	Opposition	1901	1st term
William Wallace Burns McInnes	North Nanaimo	Independent	1900	1st term
John Paton Booth	North Victoria	Independent Liberal	1871, (Note: Cowichan) 1890	5th term*
Thomas Wilson Paterson (1902)	North Victoria	Independent	1902	1st term
James Dunsmuir	South Nanaimo	Opposition	1898	2nd term
David McEwen Eberts	South Victoria	Opposition	1890	4th term
James Ford Garden	Vancouver City	Conservative (Note: Affiliated with Liberal Conservative Party led by Charles Wilson)	1900	1st term
Hugh Bowie Gilmour	Vancouver City	Government	1900	1st term
Joseph Martin	Vancouver City	Government	1898	2nd term
Robert Garnett Tatlow	Vancouver City	Conservative	1900	1st term
Richard Hall	Victoria City	Opposition	1898	2nd term
Henry Dallas Helmcken	Victoria City	Opposition	1894	3rd term
Albert Edward McPhillips	Victoria City	Opposition	1898	2nd term
John Herbert Turner	Victoria City	Opposition	1886	5th term
Edward Gawler Prior (1902)	Victoria City	Government	1886, 1902	2nd term*
John Houston	West Kootenay-Nelson	Provincial	1900	1st term
Thomas Taylor	West Kootenay-Revelstoke	Conservative	1900	1st term
Smith Curtis	West Kootenay-Rossland	Opposition	1900	1st term
Robert Francis Green	West Kootenay-Slocan	Provincial	1898	2nd term
Charles William Munro	Westminster-Chilliwhack	Provincial	1898	2nd term
John Oliver	Westminster-Delta	Government	1900	1st term
Richard McBride	Westminster-Dewdney	Conservative	1898	2nd term
Thomas Kidd	Westminster-Richmond	Provincial	1894	3rd term
Price Ellison	Yale-East	Opposition	1898	2nd term
Frederick John Fulton	Yale-North	Independent/Opposition	1900	1st term
Denis Murphy	Yale-West	Opposition/Provincial	1900	1st term
Charles Augustus Semlin (1903)	Yale-West	Opposition	1871, 1882, 1903	7th term*

== By-elections ==
By-elections were held for the following members appointed to the provincial cabinet, as was required at the time:

- David McEwen Eberts, Attorney General, acclaimed July 4, 1900
- John Herbert Turner, Minister of Finance and Agriculture, acclaimed July 4, 1900
- Wilmer Cleveland Wells, Chief Commissioner of Lands and Mines, acclaimed July 17, 1900
- James Douglas Prentice, Provincial Secretary and Minister of Education, acclaimed July 17, 1900
- James Dunsmuir, Premier, acclaimed July 17, 1900
- Richard McBride, Minister of Mines, acclaimed July 17, 1900
- John Cunningham Brown, Provincial Secretary, defeated by Thomas Gifford on September 25, 1901
- William Wallace Burns McInnes, Provincial Secretary and Minister of Education, elected January 30, 1903

By-elections were held to replace members for various other reasons:

Electoral district	Member elected	Election date	Reason
Nanaimo City	James Hurst Hawthornthwaite	February 20, 1901 (Note: Acclaimed)	R. Smith resigned to contest federal election
Vancouver City	James Ford Garden	February 19, 1901	J.F. Garden resigned to contest federal election
Victoria City	Edward Gawler Prior	March 10, 1902	J.H. Turner resigned to accept position of Agent-General
North Victoria	Thomas Wilson Paterson	December 23, 1902	Death of J.P. Booth on February 25, 1902
Yale-West	Charles Augustus Semlin	February 26, 1903	D. Murphy resigned after being named to cabinet; he subsequently withdrew from the by-election citing "personal reasons"

== Other changes ==
- Westminster-Dewdney (res. Richard McBride, appointed premier June 1, 1903)
- Vancouver City (res. Robert Garnett Tatlow, appointed Minister of Finance and Agriculture June 4, 1903)
- Victoria City (res. Albert Edward McPhillips, appointed Attorney General June 4, 1903)
- West Kootenay-Slocan (res. Robert Francis Green, appointed Minister of Mines June 4, 1903)
