= 13th Parliament of British Columbia =

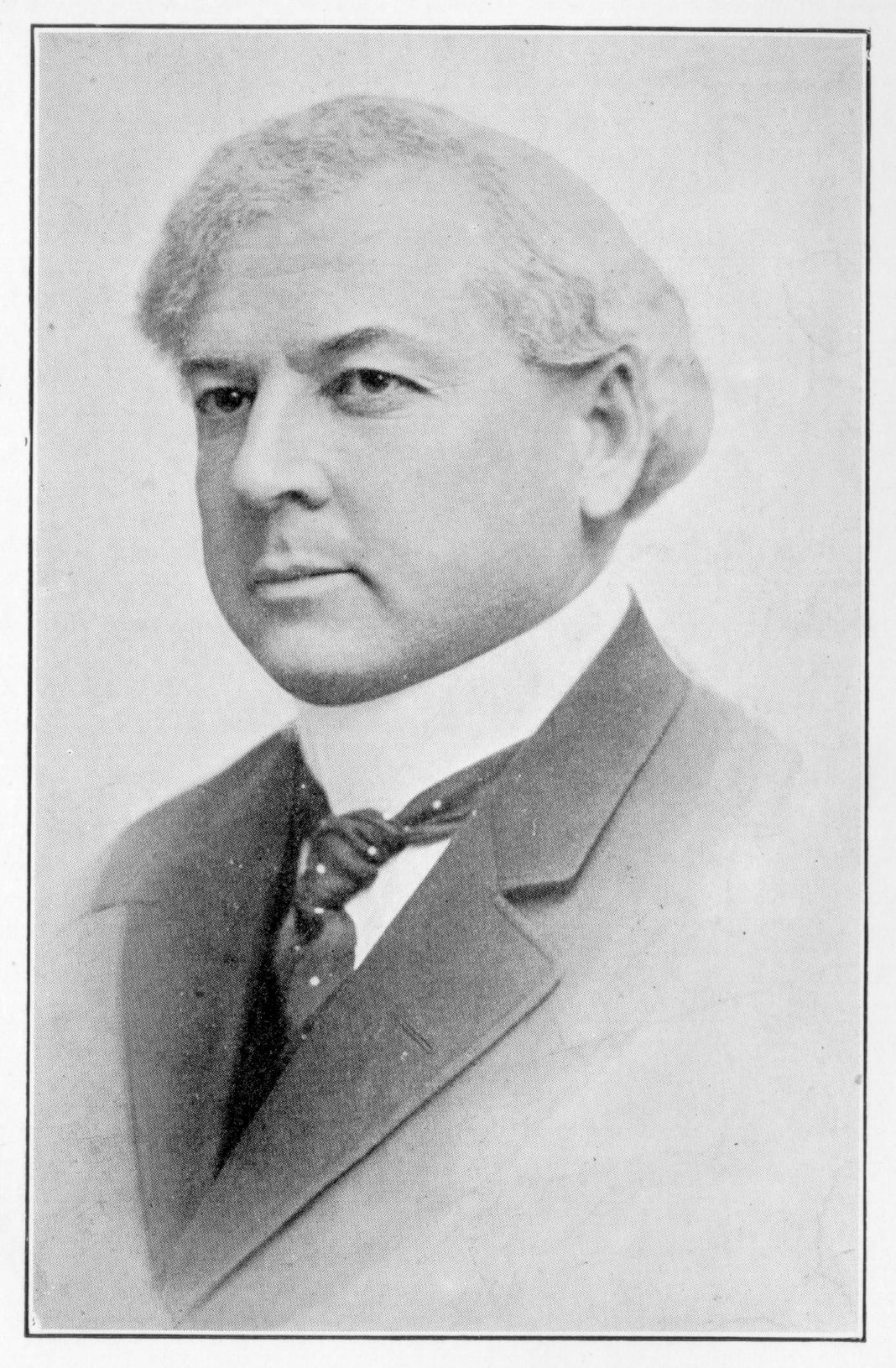
Image of Richard McBride (1870–1917), Canadian politician

The 13th Legislative Assembly of British Columbia sat from 1913 to 1916. The members were elected in the British Columbia general election held in March 1912. The British Columbia Conservative Party led by Richard McBride formed the government. McBride resigned as premier in December 1915 to become British Columbia's agent general in London. William John Bowser succeeded McBride as Premier.

David McEwen Eberts served as speaker.

== Members of the 13th Parliament ==
The following members were elected to the assembly in 1912.:

Member	Electoral district	Party	First elected / previously elected	No.# of term(s)
John George Corry Wood	Alberni	Conservative	1912	1st term
Henry Esson Young	Atlin	Conservative	1903	4th term
Michael Callanan	Cariboo	Conservative	1909	2nd term
John Anderson Fraser	Cariboo	Conservative	1909	2nd term
Samuel Arthur Cawley	Chilliwhack	Conservative	1909	2nd term
Harold Ernest Forster	Columbia	Independent Conservative	1912	1st term
Michael Manson	Comox	Conservative	1909	2nd term
William Henry Hayward	Cowichan	Conservative	1900, (Note: Esquimalt) 1907	4th term*
Thomas Donald Caven	Cranbrook	Conservative	1909	2nd term
Francis James Anderson MacKenzie	Delta	Conservative	1909	2nd term
William J. Manson	Dewdney	Conservative	1907	3rd term
Robert Henry Pooley	Esquimalt	Conservative	1912	1st term
William Roderick Ross	Fernie	Conservative	1903	4th term
Ernest Miller	Grand Forks	Conservative	1909	2nd term
John Robert Jackson	Greenwood	Conservative	1909	2nd term
Albert Edward McPhillips	The Islands	Conservative	1898, (Note: Victoria City) 1907	6th term*
William Wasbrough Foster (1913)	The Islands	Conservative	1913	1st term
James Pearson Shaw	Kamloops	Conservative	1909	2nd term
Neil Franklin MacKay	Kaslo	Conservative	1907	3rd term
Archibald McDonald	Lillooet	Conservative	1903, 1909	3rd term*
John Thomas Wilmot Place	Nanaimo City	Social Democratic	1912	1st term
William Ross MacLean	Nelson City	Conservative	1912	1st term
Parker Williams	Newcastle	Socialist	1903	4th term
Thomas Gifford	New Westminster City	Conservative	1901	5th term
Price Ellison	Okanagan	Conservative	1898	6th term
Thomas Taylor	Revelstoke	Conservative	1900	5th term
Francis Lovett Carter-Cotton	Richmond	Conservative	1890, (Note: Vancouver City) 1903	7th term*
Lorne Argyle Campbell	Rossland City	Conservative	1912	1st term
David McEwen Eberts	Saanich	Conservative	1890, (Note: Victoria) 1907	7th term*
Lytton Wilmot Shatford	Similkameen	Conservative	1903	4th term
William Manson	Skeena	Conservative	1905, (Note: Alberni) 1909	3rd term*
William Hunter	Slocan	Conservative	1907	3rd term
William John Bowser	Vancouver City	Conservative	1903	4th term
Alexander Henry Boswell MacGowan	Vancouver City	Conservative	1903	4th term
George Albert McGuire	Vancouver City	Conservative	1907	3rd term
Charles Edward Tisdall	Vancouver City	Conservative	1898, 1909	3rd term*
Henry Holgate Watson	Vancouver City	Conservative	1909	2nd term
Malcolm Archibald Macdonald (1916)	Vancouver City	Liberal	1916	1st term
Henry Frederick William Behnsen	Victoria City	Conservative	1907	3rd term
Frederick Davey	Victoria City	Conservative	1907	3rd term
Richard McBride	Victoria City	Conservative	1898	6th term
Henry Broughton Thomson	Victoria City	Conservative	1907	3rd term
Harlan Carey Brewster (1916)	Victoria City	Liberal	1907, 1916	3rd term*
Alexander Lucas	Yale	Conservative	1910	2nd term
James Hargrave Schofield	Ymir	Conservative	1907	3rd term

== Party standings ==
Affiliation	Members
Conservative	39
Socialist	1
Social Democratic	1
Independent Conservative	1
Total	42
Government Majority	36

== By-elections ==
By-elections were held for the following members appointed to the provincial cabinet, as was required at the time:

- Lorne Argyle Campbell, Minister of Mines, elected March 1, 1916
- Charles Edward Tisdall, Minister of Public Works, defeated by Malcolm Archibald Macdonald, Liberal, March 1, 1916

By-elections were held to replace members for various other reasons:

Electoral district	Member elected	Party	Election date	Reason
The Islands	William Wasbrough Foster	Conservative	December 6, 1913	A.E. McPhillips named to Appeal Court of B.C. in September 1913
Victoria City	Harlan Carey Brewster	Liberal	March 4, 1916	R. McBride named Agent-General in January 1916

== Other changes ==
- Parker Williams is expelled from the Socialist Party for also holding membership in the Social Democratic Party. On May 15, 1916, he is expelled from the Social Democrats and becomes an Independent Socialist.
