= 12th Parliament of British Columbia =

Parliament of British Columbia

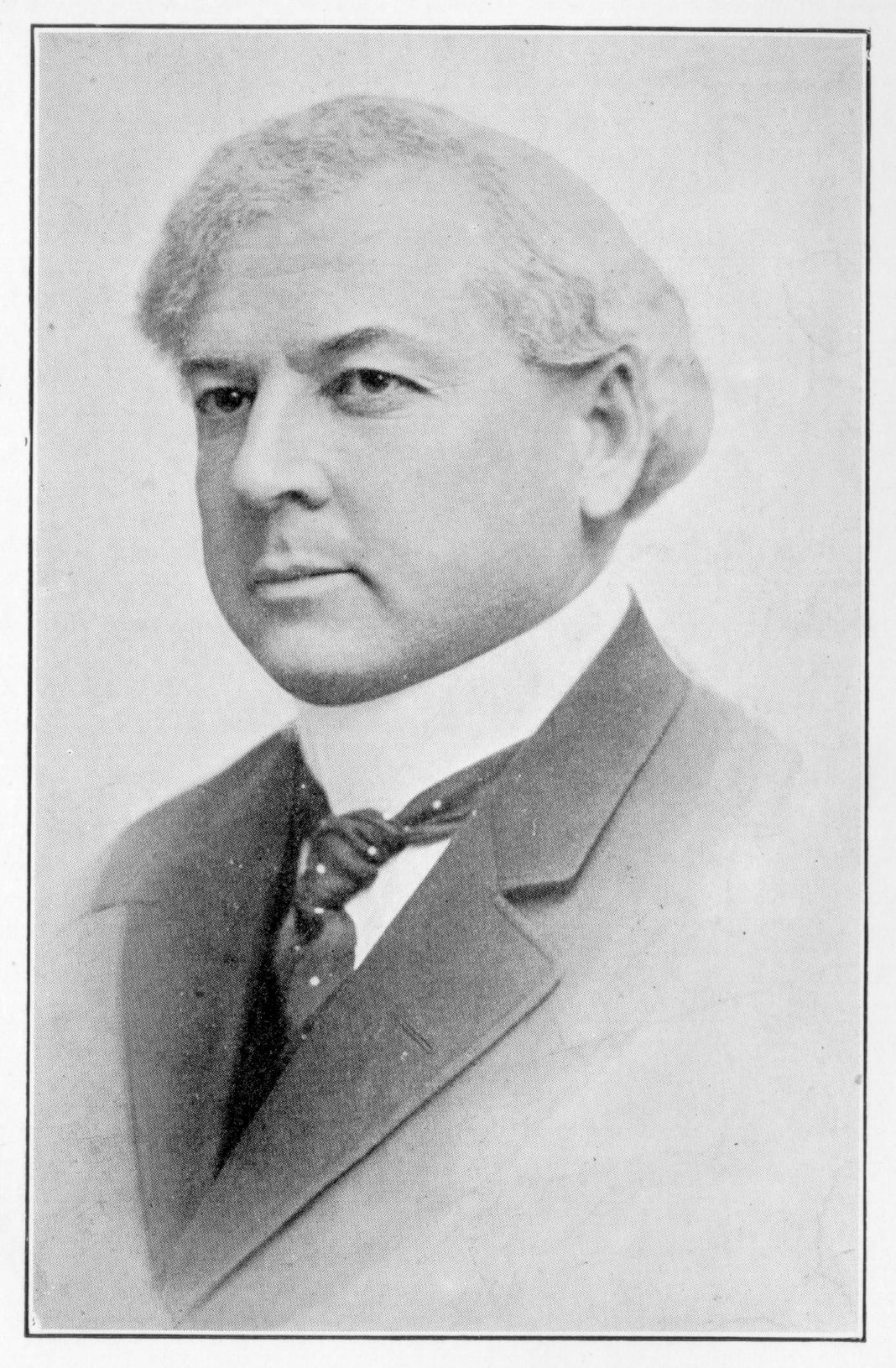
Richard McBride (1870–1917)

The 12th Legislative Assembly of British Columbia sat from 1910 to 1912. The members were elected in the British Columbia general election held in November 1909. The British Columbia Conservative Party led by Richard McBride formed the government.

David McEwen Eberts served as speaker.

== Members of the 12th Parliament ==
The following members were elected to the assembly in 1909.:

Member	Electoral district	Party	First elected / previously elected	No.# of term(s)
Harlan Carey Brewster	Alberni	Liberal	1907	2nd term
Henry Esson Young	Atlin	Conservative	1903	3rd term
Michael Callanan	Cariboo	Conservative	1909	1st term
John Anderson Fraser	Cariboo	Conservative	1909	1st term
Samuel Arthur Cawley	Chilliwhack	Conservative	1909	1st term
Henry George Parson	Columbia	Conservative	1907	2nd term
Michael Manson	Comox	Conservative	1909	1st term
William Henry Hayward	Cowichan	Conservative	1900, (Note: Esquimalt) 1907	3rd term*
Thomas Donald Caven	Cranbrook	Conservative	1909	1st term
Francis James Anderson MacKenzie	Delta	Conservative	1909	1st term
William J. Manson	Dewdney	Conservative	1907	2nd term
John Jardine	Esquimalt	Liberal	1907	2nd term
John Jardine	Esquimalt	Conservative	1907	2nd term
William Roderick Ross	Fernie	Conservative	1903	3rd term
Ernest Miller	Grand Forks	Conservative	1909	1st term
John Robert Jackson	Greenwood	Conservative	1909	1st term
Albert Edward McPhillips	The Islands	Conservative	1898, (Note: Victoria City) 1907	5th term*
James Pearson Shaw	Kamloops	Conservative	1909	1st term
Neil Franklin MacKay	Kaslo	Conservative	1907	2nd term
Archibald McDonald	Lillooet	Conservative	1903, 1909	2nd term*
James Hurst Hawthornthwaite	Nanaimo City	Socialist	1901	4th term
Harry Wright	Nelson City	Conservative	1903, (Note: Ymir) 1909	2nd term*
Parker Williams	Newcastle	Socialist	1903	3rd term
Thomas Gifford	New Westminster City	Conservative	1901	4th term
Price Ellison	Okanagan	Conservative	1898	5th term
Thomas Taylor	Revelstoke	Conservative	1900	4th term
Francis Lovett Carter-Cotton	Richmond	Conservative	1890, (Note: Vancouver City) 1903	6th term*
William Robert Braden	Rossland City	Conservative	1909	1st term
David McEwen Eberts	Saanich	Conservative	1890, (Note: Victoria) 1907	6th term*
Lytton Wilmot Shatford	Similkameen	Conservative	1903	3rd term
William Manson	Skeena	Conservative	1905, (Note: Alberni) 1909	2nd term*
William Hunter	Slocan	Conservative	1907	2nd term
William John Bowser	Vancouver City	Conservative	1903	3rd term
Alexander Henry Boswell MacGowan	Vancouver City	Conservative	1903	3rd term
George Albert McGuire	Vancouver City	Conservative	1907	2nd term
Charles Edward Tisdall	Vancouver City	Conservative	1898, 1909	2nd term*
Henry Holgate Watson	Vancouver City	Conservative	1909	1st term
Henry Frederick William Behnsen	Victoria City	Conservative	1907	2nd term
Frederick Davey	Victoria City	Conservative	1907	2nd term
Richard McBride (Note: Elected in both Yale and Victoria; choosing to sit for Victoria)	Victoria City	Conservative	1898	5th term
Henry Broughton Thomson	Victoria City	Conservative	1907	2nd term
Richard McBride	Yale	Conservative	1898	5th term
Alexander Lucas (1910)	Yale	Conservative	1910	1st term
James Hargrave Schofield	Ymir	Conservative	1907	2nd term

== Party standings ==
Affiliation	Members
Conservative	38
Liberal	2
Socialist	2
Total	42
Government Majority	34

== By-elections ==
By-elections were held for the following members appointed to the provincial cabinet, as was required at the time:

- William Roderick Ross, Minister of Lands, elected November 26, 1910

By-elections were held to replace members for various other reasons:

Electoral district	Member elected	Party	Election date	Reason
Yale	Alexander Lucas	Conservative	December 12, 1910 (Note: Acclaimed)	R. McBride resigned seat; elected in both Victoria City and Yale

== Other changes ==
- Liberal John Jardine crossed the floor to join the Conservatives in 1911.
