= 1909 British Columbia general election =

Canadian provincial election

← 1907	November 25, 1909	1912 →

42 seats to the 12th Legislative Assembly of British Columbia 22 seats were needed for a majority
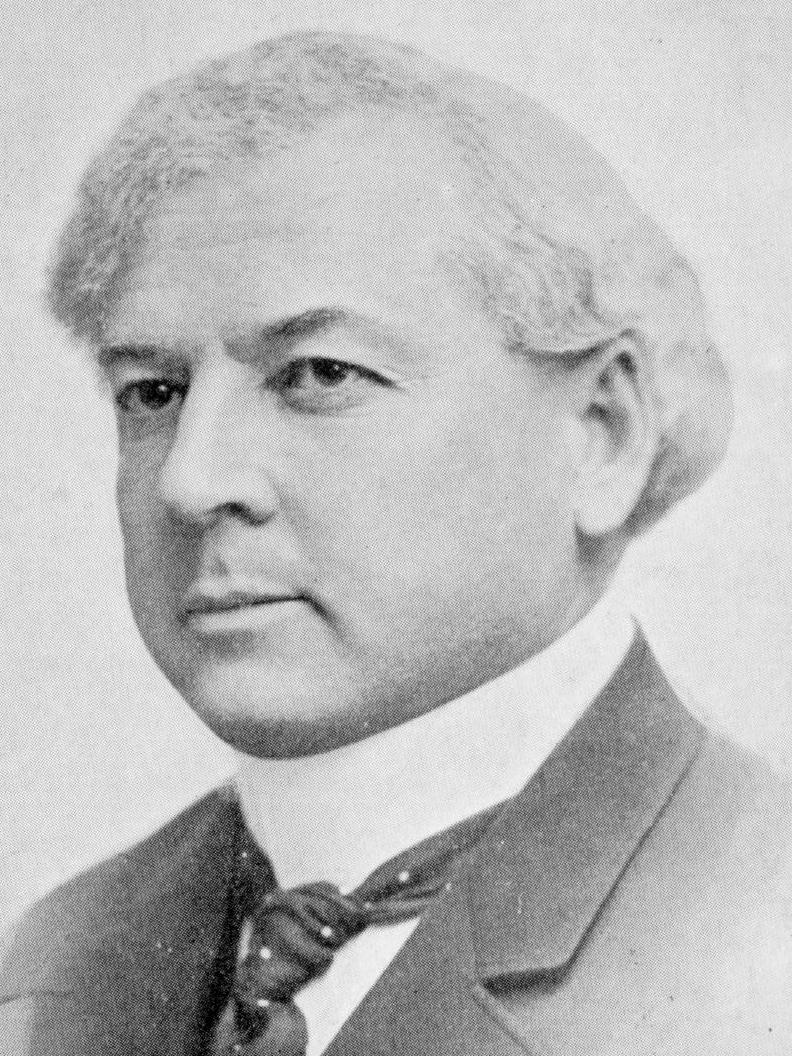

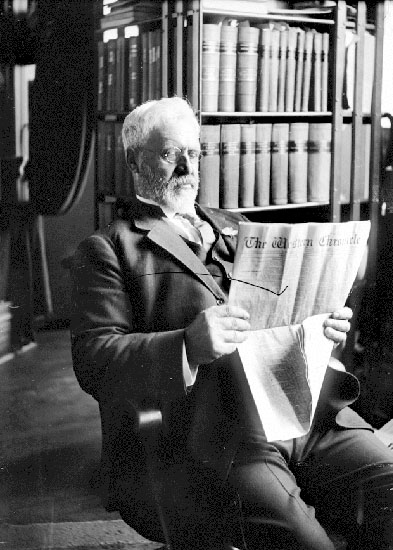
	First party	Second party	Third party
			SPC
Leader	Sir Richard McBride	John Oliver	No leader
Party	Conservative	Liberal	Socialist
Leader's seat	Victoria City; Yale	Ran in Delta (lost); Victoria City (lost)
Last election	26 seats, 48.70%	13 seats, 37.15%	3 seats, 8.87%
Seats won	38	2	2
Seat change	▲12	▼11	▼1
Popular vote	53,074	33,675	11,665
Percentage	52.33%	33.21%	11.50%
Swing	▲3.63pp	▼3.94pp	▲2.63pp
Premier before election
Richard McBride
Conservative
Premier after election
Richard McBride
Conservative

The 1909 British Columbia general election was the twelfth general election for the Province of British Columbia, Canada. It was held to elect members of the Legislative Assembly of British Columbia. The election was called on October 20, 1909, and held on November 25, 1909. The new legislature met for the first time on January 20, 1910.

The governing Conservative Party won its third consecutive term in government with over half of the popular vote and all but four of the 42 seats in the legislature, effectively a rout for the popular incumbent Premier, Sir Richard McBride.

Ten days after the dissolution of the Legislature, James Alexander MacDonald announced his retirement from the leadership of the Liberal Party to become Chief Justice of the British Columbia Supreme Court, and John Oliver was selected to take his place. Despite winning almost one-third of the popular vote, the Liberals won only two seats, the same number won by the Socialist Party with only 11.5% of the vote.

The first-past-the-post allocation of seats, combined with the multi-member constituencies in effect at the time, ensured that the Conservatives won with a lead of 34 seats, instead of only a lead of two seats that its proportion of the popular vote should have granted it.

Two candidates campaigned in multiple ridings. McBride won in both Yale and Victoria City, while Oliver was defeated in Delta and Victoria City.

== Results ==
Elections to the Legislative Assembly of British Columbia (1909)
Political party	Party leader	MLAs				Votes			
Political party	Party leader	Candidates	1907	1909	±	#	±	%	± (pp)
Conservative	Richard McBride	42	26	38	12▲	53,074	22,293▲	52.33%	3.63▲
Liberal	John Oliver	36	13	2	11▼	33,675	10,194▲	33.21%	3.94▼
Socialist		20	3	2	1▼	11,665	6,062▲	11.50%	2.63▲
Independent		3	–	–	–	2,625	2,478▲	2.59%	2.36▲
Canadian Labour		1	–	–	–	165	2,330▼	0.16%	3.79▼
Independent Conservative		1	–	–	–	154	154▲	0.15%	New
Independent Labour		1	–	–	–	57	430▼	0.06%	0.71▼
Total		104	42	42		101,415		100.00%	

Seats and popular vote by party
Party	Seats	Votes	Change (pp)
█ Conservative	38 / 42	52.33%	3.63
█ Liberal	2 / 42	33.21%	-3.94
█ Socialist	2 / 42	11.50%	2.63
█ Labour	0 / 42	0.16%	-3.79
█ Other	0 / 42	2.80%	1.47

== Results by riding ==
The following MLAs were elected:

Alberni: Harlan Carey Brewster
Atlin: Henry Esson Young
Cariboo: Michael Callanan
Cariboo: John Anderson Fraser
Chilliwhack: Samuel Arthur Cawley
Columbia: Henry George Parson
Comox: Michael Manson
Cowichan: William Henry Hayward
Cranbrook: Thomas Donald Caven
Delta: Francis James Anderson MacKenzie
Dewdney: William J. Manson
Esquimalt: John Jardine
Fernie: William Roderick Ross
Grand Forks: Ernest Miller
Greenwood: John Robert Jackson
The Islands: Albert Edward McPhillips
Kamloops: James Pearson Shaw
Kaslo: Neil Franklin MacKay
Lillooet: Archibald McDonald
Nanaimo City: James Hurst Hawthornthwaite
Nelson City: Harry Wright
Newcastle: Parker Williams
New Westminster City: Thomas Gifford
Okanagan: Price Ellison
Revelstoke: Thomas Taylor
Richmond: Francis Lovett Carter-Cotton
Rossland City: William Robert Braden
Saanich: David McEwen Eberts
Similkameen: Lytton Wilmot Shatford
Skeena: William Manson
Slocan: William Hunter
Vancouver City: Charles William John Bowser
Vancouver City: Alexander Henry Boswell MacGowan
Vancouver City: George Albert McGuire
Vancouver City: Charles Edward Tisdall
Vancouver City: Henry Holgate Watson
Victoria City: Henry Frederick William Behnsen
Victoria City: Frederick Davey
Victoria City: Richard McBride
Victoria City: Henry Broughton Thomson
Yale: Richard McBride (Note: McBride also won a seat in Victoria. He renounced Yale, and Alexander Lucas (Con) would win in the subsequent byelection.)
Ymir: James Hargrave Schofield

=== Synopsis of results ===
Results by riding - 1909 British Columbia general election (single-member districts)
Riding	Winning party						Votes					
Name	1907	Party	Votes	Share	Margin #	Margin %	Con	Lib	Soc	Ind	Oth	Total
Alberni	Lib	Lib	293	53.37%	37	6.74%	256	293	–	–	–	549
Atlin	Con	Con	107	62.21%	42	24.42%	107	65	–	–	–	172
Chilliwhack	Lib	Con	604	54.07%	91	8.14%	604	513	–	–	–	1,117
Columbia	Con	Con	262	51.68%	17	3.36%	262	245	–	–	–	507
Comox	Con	Con	451	45.88%	245	24.92%	451	172	206	–	154	983
Cowichan	Con	Con	365	67.59%	190	35.18%	365	175	–	–	–	540
Cranbrook	Lib	Con	761	54.16%	260	18.50%	761	501	143	–	–	1,405
Delta	Lib	Con	765	58.13%	214	16.26%	765	551	–	–	–	1,316
Dewdney	Con	Con	625	67.42%	323	34.84%	625	302	–	–	–	927
Esquimalt	Lib	Lib	436	54.64%	74	9.28%	362	436	–	–	–	798
Fernie	Con	Con	795	43.00%	146	7.90%	795	405	649	–	–	1,849
Grand Forks	Soc	Con	516	51.60%	182	18.20%	516	150	334	–	–	1,000
Greenwood	Lib	Con	260	42.07%	56	9.06%	260	154	204	–	–	618
The Islands	Con	Con	270	56.60%	63	13.20%	270	207	–	–	–	477
Kamloops	Con	Con	872	64.40%	390	28.80%	872	482	–	–	–	1,354
Kaslo	Con	Con	293	68.62%	159	37.24%	293	134	–	–	–	427
Lillooet	Lib	Con	167	58.80%	50	17.60%	167	117	–	–	–	284
Nanaimo City	Soc	Soc	786	62.88%	322	25.76%	464	–	786	–	–	1,250
Nelson City	Lib	Con	565	54.54%	242	23.36%	565	323	148	–	–	1,036
Newcastle	Soc	Soc	379	52.64%	105	14.58%	274	–	379	67	–	720
New Westminster City	Con	Con	881	52.98%	264	25.88%	881	617	–	–	165	1,663
Okanagan	Con	Con	1,538	62.34%	797	32.30%	1,538	741	188	–	–	2,467
Revelstoke	Con	Con	758	62.18%	418	34.29%	758	–	121	340	–	1,219
Richmond	Con	Con	918	57.92%	251	15.84%	918	667	–	–	–	1,585
Rossland City	Lib	Con	237	38.60%	20	3.26%	237	217	160	–	–	614
Saanich	Con	Con	412	57.62%	109	15.24%	412	303	–	–	–	715
Similkameen	Con	Con	440	68.22%	235	36.44%	440	205	–	–	–	645
Skeena	Lib	Con	822	60.35%	445	32.67%	822	377	163	–	–	1,362
Slocan	Con	Con	309	57.43%		%	309	–	172	–	57	538
Yale	Lib	Con	455	63.19%	190	26.38%	455	265	–	–	–	720
Ymir	Con	Con	699	65.63%	333	31.26%	699	–	366	–	–	1,065

= open seat
= turnout is above provincial average
= winning candidate was in previous Legislature
= incumbent had switched allegiance
= not incumbent; was previously elected to the Legislature
= incumbency arose from byelection gain
= other incumbents renominated
= endorsed by the Liberals
= multiple candidates

Results by riding - 1909 British Columbia general election (multiple-member districts)
Party	Cariboo			Vancouver City			Victoria City		
Party	Votes	Share	Change	Votes	Share	Change	Votes	Share	Change
Conservative	540	63.01%	19.13%	25,710	50.10%	-1.28%	10,321	53.42%	5.88%
Liberal	317	36.99%	-19.13%	18,619	36.28%	-0.03%	6,122	31.69%	-3.97%
Socialist	–	–	–	6,987	13.62%	3.57%	659	3.41%	-0.12%
Independent	–	–	–	–	–	–	2,218	11.48%	11.48%
Canadian Labour	–	–	–	–	–	-2.26%	–	–	-13.28%
Total	857	100.00%		51,316	100.00%		19,320	100.00%	
Seats won	2			5			4		
Incumbents returned	–			3			4		
Seat change	2▼			–			–		

== See also ==
- List of British Columbia political parties
