= John Sedgwick Cowper =

Canadian politician (1876–1947)

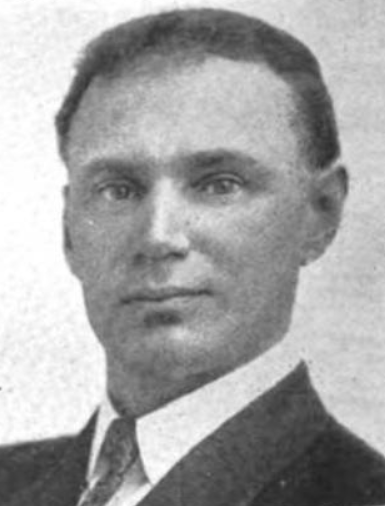

Member of the Legislative Assembly of British Columbia
- In office 1916–1920
- Constituency: Vancouver City

Personal details
- Born: June 12, 1876 Liverpool, England
- Died: July 10, 1947 (aged 71) Read Island, British Columbia
- Party: Liberal
- Spouse: Eleanor Radcliffe (m. 1898)
- Children: 4
- Occupation: Journalist, politician

John Sedgwick Cowper (June 12, 1876 – July 10, 1947) was an English-born journalist, newspaper editor, woodworker and political figure in British Columbia. He represented Vancouver City from 1916 to 1920 in the Legislative Assembly of British Columbia as a Liberal.

== Biography ==
John Sedgwick Cowper was born on June 12, 1876, in Liverpool, the son of a naval officer, and was educated there. Cowper married Eleanor Radcliffe in May 1898 and they had four daughters. They came to Canada in 1901. From 1905 to 1910, Cowper worked for The Globe in Toronto. In 1911, he moved to Prince Rupert, British Columbia, and became editor of the Prince Rupert Daily News. In 1916, he moved to Vancouver. In 1924, he began working for the Saturday Tribune there. Cowper also served as editor of The Vancouver Daily World and worked on newspapers in Regina and Edmonton. He died at his home on Read Island.

Preceded by M. A. Macdonald (Lib.); C. E. Tisdall (Cons.); G. A. McGuire (Cons.); W. J. Bowser (Cons.); A. H. B. MacGowan (Cons.)	MLA of Vancouver City; 1916-1920; With: M. A. Macdonald (Lib.) (1916-20); R. Smith (Lib.) (1916-17); J. W. D. Farris (Lib.) (1916-20); W. J. Bowser (Cons.) (1916-20); J. S. Cowper (Lib.) (1916-20); M. E. Smith (Lib.) (1918-20)	Succeeded by M. A. Macdonald (Lib.); M. E. Smith (Lib.); I. A. Mackenzie (Lib.); J. W. D. Farris (Lib.); W. J. Bowser (Cons.); J. Ramsay (Lib.)
