= Joseph Martin (Canadian politician) =

Canadian politician (1852-1923)

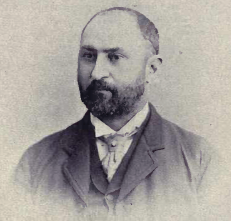
- "Fighting" Joe Martin

13th Premier of British Columbia
- In office 28 February 1900 – 14 June 1900
- Monarch: Victoria
- Lieutenant Governor: Thomas Robert McInnes
- Preceded by: Charles Semlin
- Succeeded by: James Dunsmuir

Member of the Legislative Assembly of British Columbia for Vancouver City
- In office 9 July 1898 – 3 October 1903 Serving with Francis Lovett Carter-Cotton, Robert Macpherson, Charles Edward Tisdall, James Garden, Hugh Bowie Gilmour, Robert Garnett Tatlow
- Preceded by: Adolphus Williams
- Succeeded by: William John Bowser

Member of the Parliament of Canada for Winnipeg
- In office 2 November 1893 – 23 June 1896
- Preceded by: Hugh John Macdonald
- Succeeded by: Hugh John Macdonald

Member of the Legislative Assembly of Manitoba for Portage la Prairie
- In office 23 January 1883 – 23 July 1892
- Preceded by: James Cowan
- Succeeded by: Robert Watson

Member of the Parliament of the United Kingdom for St Pancras East
- In office 17 January 1910 – 14 December 1918
- Preceded by: Hugh Lea
- Succeeded by: constituency abolished

Personal details
- Born: 24 September 1852 Milton, Canada West
- Died: 2 March 1923 (aged 70) Vancouver, British Columbia, Canada
- Party: Government; Manitoba Liberal Party; Liberal Party of Canada; Liberal Party (UK); British Columbia Liberal Party
- Spouse: Eliza Eaton
- Children: Irma Livingstone Eaton

Joseph Martin (24 September 1852 – 2 March 1923) was a lawyer and politician in Manitoba, British Columbia and the United Kingdom often referred to as "Fighting Joe".

== Early life ==
Born in Milton, Canada West, the son of Edward Martin, a former Reeve, and Mary Ann Fleming, Martin was educated at the Milton public school, the Toronto Normal School and University of Toronto. He was a telegraph operator and afterwards obtained a First-class Teacher's certificate, and was appointed principal of the public school in New Edinburgh, Ontario. He studied law in Ottawa and moved to Portage la Prairie, Manitoba in 1882. He was called to the Bar of Manitoba in 1882.

== Political career ==
=== Manitoba ===
He was first elected as the member of the Legislative Assembly of Manitoba for the Portage la Prairie riding in 1883 and served as Attorney-General in the government of Thomas Greenway. In 1890, he initiated legislation to end French language instruction and support for Catholic separate schools, prompting the Manitoba Schools Question crisis.

=== Canada ===
Martin ran unsuccessfully as a Liberal candidate in the 1891 election to become the Member of Parliament for Selkirk. When Sir Hugh Macdonald resigned his Winnipeg seat, Martin ran in the 1893 by-election and won by acclamation. He lost the seat to Macdonald when they both ran for re-election in Selkirk in the 1896 election. He later ran in the 1908 election as an independent in the Vancouver City federal riding but was not elected.

=== British Columbia ===
After his defeat in Manitoba, Martin left for British Columbia to settle in Vancouver. He arrived at a time of booming prosperity. He took up the practice of law and made a fortune developing the Hastings Manor subdivision in Vancouver.

Martin was first elected to the British Columbia Legislative Assembly in 1898 election in the multi-member Vancouver City riding. The general election did not yield a majority of seats for any one party. At the time, increased representation for mainland ridings and a shift in popular support away from the Turner government, a government seen as being for special interests, railway industrialists, coal barons, lumber and fishing capitalists. Turner's support in the Legislature fell to 17 of 38 seats. Lieutenant-Governor Thomas R. McInnes dismissed Turner on 8 August 1898 without allowing him the constitutional right to meet the legislature. Instead he turned to former premier Robert Beaven, who had not won a seat, to form a government. He was unable to assemble majority support.

McInnes then turned to Charles Semlin to form a government. Semlin took office as premier and chose Martin as his Attorney-General. Martin also served as the Acting Minister of Education from 17 August 1898 to 9 March 1899 and as the Acting Provincial Secretary from 17 to 20 August 1898.

During the two year Semlin government, Martin caused controversy by introducing the eight-hour work day (opposed by mine owners) and an Alien Exclusion Act to prevent Chinese from owning mining claims. The federal government, at the instance of American interests, took steps to disallow the legislation. During a controversial public meeting about the issue, Martin breached cabinet solidarity and criticized his own government. This resulted in Premier Semlin requested Martin's resignation. When Semlin reconstituted his ministries and met the legislature, he encountered opposition from Martin, often requiring the Speaker of the house to break ties by using his casting vote.

On 27 February 1900 McInnes dismissed Semlin as premier and, the following day, asked Martin to form a government. The legislature conducted a vote of non-confidence, which carried by a majority of 28 to 1. Nevertheless, Martin formed a cabinet and continued in government.

Martin took positions on leading questions of the day in order to have an election platform. He endorsed government ownership of railways and the principle of an eight-hour work day. He also moved to introduce partisanship by appointing a cabinet of Liberal supporters, but the British Columbia Liberal Association opposed the move.

The 1900 election was a defeat for Martin, as only five of his supporters were elected. Following the election, Prime Minister Laurier dismissed McInnes and appointed Sir Henri-Gustave Joly de Lotbinière as lieutenant governor. The legislature agreed to support James Dunsmuir to lead a government. Martin moved to the opposition, but the press noted "extreme friendliness" between him and Dunsmuir and he often spoke in favour of the government. During this time, the Liberals dropped their opposition to party politics and elected Martin as their leader. Martin then claimed to be the leader of the Opposition, though he co-operated with the Dunsmuir government.

He was defeated in the 1903 election, the first in British Columbia organized on party lines.

In 1907, he founded the Vancouver Guardian newspaper. He travelled to England. After his return to BC, he ran in the 1920 election in Vancouver as an Independent under the banner of the Asiatic Exclusion League. He was unsuccessful and lost his deposit.

Martin, who died of complications from diabetes in March 1923, was the first person in Vancouver to be treated with insulin.

=== United Kingdom ===
He moved to the United Kingdom where he won a seat in the British House of Commons as a Liberal Member of Parliament for St Pancras East. He served from 1910 until 1918.

In December 1911, Winston Churchill, then the First Lord of the Admiralty, had announced to the House of Commons that the British fleet was ready for war. Martin fiercely attacked the Admiralty over the grounding of the warship Niobe "only to be completely and unceremoniously silenced by a biting answer from the First Lord."

The St Pancras East Liberal Association and Martin had a difficult relationship. By 1914 the association did not want Martin to continue as their MP and in May selected Richard Leopold Reiss to be their candidate for the general election expected to be called late 1914/early 1915. Martin said he would resign his seat and contest the resulting by-election as an Independent Lib-Lab candidate. Confronted with the prospect of losing the by-election to the Unionist, due to a split Liberal vote, the Liberal association told Martin in June that they would not contest the by-election. In July Martin announced that he would instead resign his seat and return to his native Canada, allowing Reiss to run against a Unionist in the by-election. Martin changed his mind again and decided not to resign his seat. In August war was declared, the general election was deferred, Reiss resigned as candidate to enlisted and Martin continued as MP.

Relations between Martin and his local Liberal association continued to be uncertain. Finally he crossed the floor to join the Labour Party. In early 1918 he was selected to run as Labour candidate in neighbouring Islington South. However, by close of nominations, there was no Labour candidate nominated.

Martin was also a candidate for mayor of Vancouver in 1914 and founded another newspaper there in 1916.

== Sources ==
- Margaret A. Ormsby (1958). British Columbia: A History. MacMillan: Vancouver.
- James Morton (1974). In the Sea of Sterile Mountains: The Chinese in British Columbia. J.J. Douglas: Vancouver.

Parliament of Canada
Preceded by Sir Hugh John Macdonald	Member of Parliament for Winnipeg; 1893–1896	Succeeded by Sir Hugh John Macdonald
Political offices
Preceded by Multi Member Riding	Member of the Legislature of British Columbia for Vancouver City; 1898–1907	Succeeded by Multi Member Riding
Parliament of the United Kingdom
Preceded by Hugh Lea	Member of Parliament for St Pancras East; 1910–1918	Constituency abolished
