= William John Bowser =

Canadian politician (1867–1933)

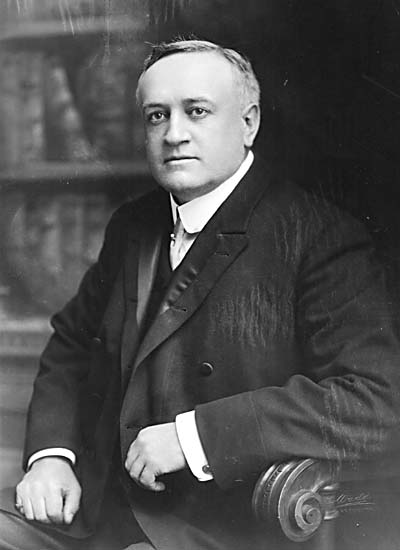
- Hon. William John Bowser

17th Premier of British Columbia
- In office December 15, 1915 – November 23, 1916
- Monarch: George V
- Lieutenant Governor: Francis Stillman Barnard
- Preceded by: Richard McBride
- Succeeded by: Harlan Carey Brewster

MLA for Vancouver City
- In office October 3, 1903 – June 20, 1924 Serving with James Garden, Alexander Henry Boswall MacGowan, Robert Garnett Tatlow, Charles Wilson, George Albert McGuire, Charles Edward Tisdall, Henry Holgate Watson, John Sedgwick Cowper, John Wallace de Beque Farris, Malcolm Archibald Macdonald, John William McIntosh, Ralph Smith, Mary Ellen Smith, James Ramsay
- Preceded by: Joseph Martin
- Succeeded by: Ian Alistair MacKenzie

Personal details
- Born: December 3, 1867 Rexton, New Brunswick, Canada
- Died: October 25, 1933 (aged 65) Vancouver, British Columbia, Canada
- Party: Conservative
- Spouse: Lorinda Doherty Bowser
- Children: Eunice Margaret Mitchell
- Education: Mount Allison College (BA); Dalhousie University (LLB)

William John Bowser (December 3, 1867 – October 25, 1933) was a politician in British Columbia, Canada. He served as the 17th premier of British Columbia from 1915 to 1916.

The son of William Bowser and Margaret Gordon, Bowser was educated at Mount Allison University and Dalhousie University. He moved to Vancouver to practice law in 1891, and after being an unsuccessful candidate in the 1898 provincial election, was first elected to the provincial legislature in the 1903 election as a Conservative. Bowser served as Attorney General in the cabinet of Sir Richard McBride from 1907 until 1915. As Attorney General, Bowser forced the Squamish First Nation, then the False Creek Indian Band, off Kitsilano Indian Reserve no.6. He also served as Minister of Finance and Agriculture between October 1909 and October 1910, and then again between March and December 1915.

In 1915, he succeeded McBride as Premier. He also served as Attorney-General in his own administration.

The Conservative party was deeply divided and unpopular and the change in leadership did not improve matters. Accusations of corruption and "machine politics" were rife. The Conservatives also neglected to address popular demands for women's suffrage and prohibition. Bowser's government was defeated in the 1916 election, losing to Liberal leader Harlan Carey Brewster, who two years later was succeeded by the more memorable John Oliver. Bowser continued as leader of the opposition until he lost his seat in the 1924 election.

He returned to politics in the 1933 election to lead the Non-Partisan Independent Group of candidates, but suffered a heart attack and died during the election campaign.

A river, a lake and the small community of Bowser on Vancouver Island, between Parksville and the Comox Valley, are named for Bowser.

1896 Canadian federal election: Burrard
| Party | Candidate | Votes | % | ±% |
|---|---|---|---|---|
| Liberal | George Ritchie Maxwell | 1,512 | 48.21 | – |
| Conservative | George Henry Cowan | 1,214 | 38.71 | – |
| Conservative | William John Bowser | 410 | 13.07 | – |
| Total valid votes | | 3,136 | 100.00 | |
| Total rejected ballots | | – | | |
| Turnout | | 3,136 | 30.48 | – |
| Eligible voters | | 10,290 | | |
| Liberal notional gain | | Swing | | – |
This riding was created from New Westminster, which elected a Conservative in the previous election. Maxwell also nominated or endorsed by the Nationlist Party (a short lived labour party) and the McCarthyites
Source: Library of Parliament
