= 1900 British Columbia general election =

Canadian provincial election

← 1898	June 9, 1900	1903 →

38 seats of the Legislative Assembly of British Columbia
Premier before election
Joseph Martin
Government
Elected Premier
James Dunsmuir
Opposition

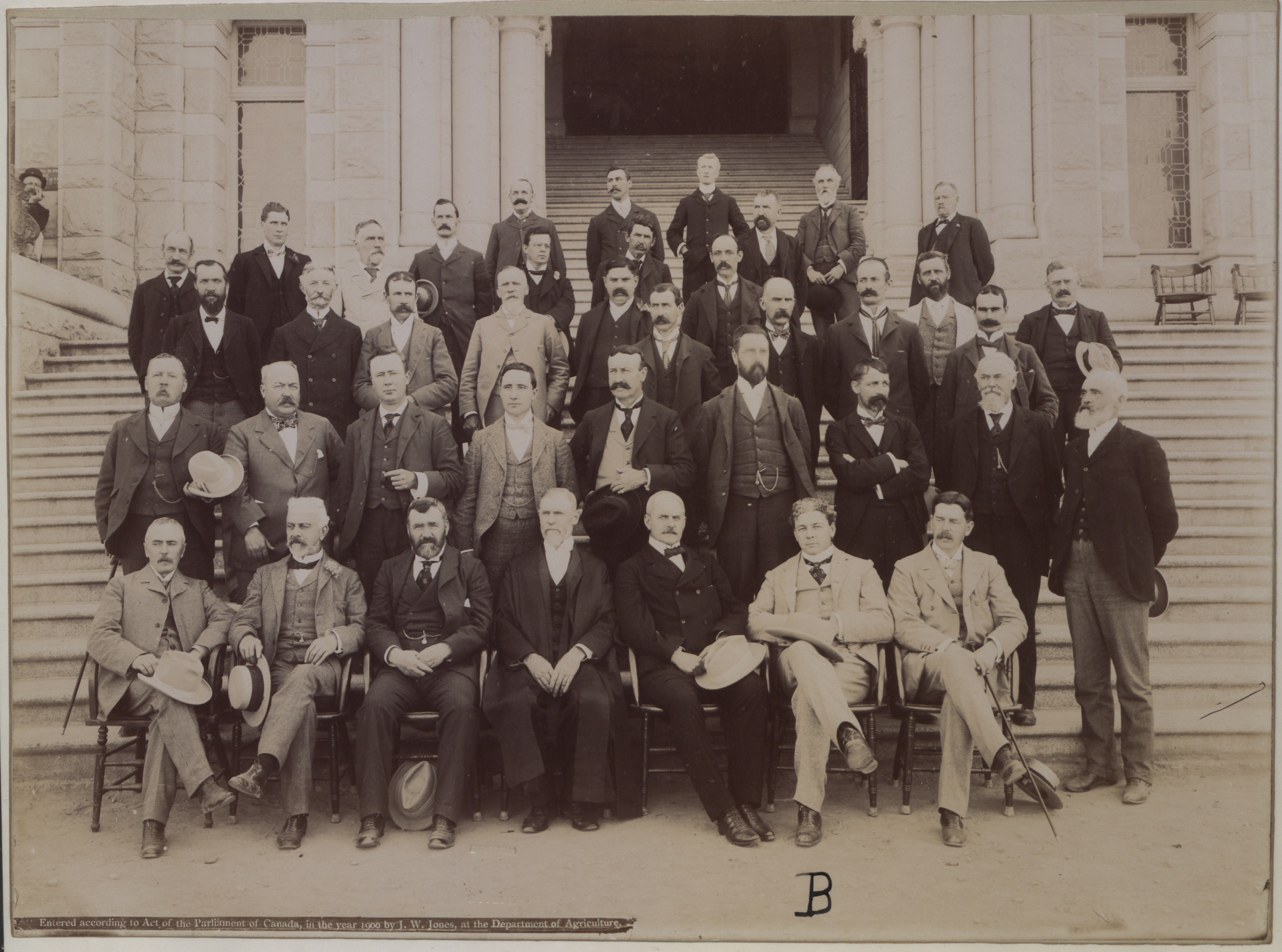
Members of the Legislature of British Columbia, 1900

The 1900 British Columbia general election was held in 1900. It was held to elect members of the Legislative Assembly of British Columbia. The election was called on April 24, 1900, and held on June 9, 1900. The new legislature met for the first time on July 19, 1900.

Like in the previous BC general election, of the 38 MLAs 24 were elected in single member districts in 1900. There were also three 2-member districts and two 4-member districts. Each voter could cast as many votes as there were seats to fill in the district.

This was the last election in which political parties were not part of the official process in British Columbia, although because of the political chaos in this year resulting from the joint misrule of Premier Joseph Martin and the Lieutenant-Governor, Thomas Robert McInnes, many individual candidates declared their party affiliations in many ridings as a protest against the non-party system.

For more on the political circumstances of this election, please see 1898 British Columbia general election.

== Results by riding ==
Results of British Columbia general election, 1900
Government		Opposition	
Member	Riding & party	Riding & party	Member
Edwin Clarke Smith	East Kootenay (south riding); Government	Cassiar; Conservative Opposition; Independent Opposition	Charles William Digby Clifford
John Oliver	Westminster-Delta; Government	Cassiar; Conservative Opposition; Independent Opposition	James Stables
John Cunningham Brown	New Westminster City; Government	Alberni; Progressive	Alan Webster Neill
Hugh Bowie Gilmour	Vancouver City; Government	Cariboo; Opposition	Joseph Hunter
Joseph Martin^{1}	Vancouver City; Government	Cariboo; Opposition	Samuel Augustus Rogers
Smith Curtis	West Kootenay-Rossland; Government	Comox; Opposition	Lewis Alfred Mounce
		Esquimalt; Independent Opposition; Opposition	William Henry Hayward
		Esquimalt; Independent Opposition; Opposition	Charles Edward Pooley
		Cowichan; Independent Conservative	Charles Herbert Dickie
		Lillooet East; Opposition Progressive	James Douglas Prentice
		East Kootenay (north riding); Independent Progressive	Wilmer Cleveland Wells
		Nanaimo City; Labour	Ralph Smith
		South Nanaimo; Opposition	James Dunsmuir^{2}
		Lillooet West; Independent Opposition	Alfred Wellington Smith
		Vancouver City; Conservative	James Ford Garden
		Vancouver City; Conservative	Robert Garnett Tatlow
		North Nanaimo; Independent	William Wallace Burns McInnes
		North Victoria; Independent Liberal	John Paton Booth
		South Victoria; Opposition	David McEwen Eberts
		West Kootenay-Nelson; Opposition	John Frederick Hume
		Victoria City; Opposition	Richard Hall
		Victoria City; Opposition	Henry Dallas Helmcken
		Victoria City; Opposition	Albert Edward McPhillips
		Victoria City; Opposition	John Herbert Turner
		West Kootenay-Revelstoke; Conservative	Thomas Taylor
		West Kootenay-Slocan; Progressive	Robert Francis Green
		Westminster-Chilliwhack; Progressive	Charles William Munro
		Westminster-Dewdney; Conservative	Richard McBride
		Westminster-Richmond; Conservative	Thomas Kidd
		Yale-East; Opposition	Price Ellison
		Yale-North; Independent Opposition	Frederick John Fulton
		Yale-West; Opposition Progressive	Denis Murphy
^{1} Incumbent Premier			^{2} Premier-Elect

== See also ==
- List of British Columbia political parties

== Further reading & references ==
- In the Sea of Sterile Mountains: The Chinese in British Columbia, Joseph Morton, J.J. Douglas, Vancouver (1974). Despite its title, a fairly thorough account of the politicians and electoral politics in early BC.
