= 1903 British Columbia general election =

Canadian provincial election

- October 3, 1903

42 seats in the Legislative Assembly of British Columbia 22 seats needed for a majority
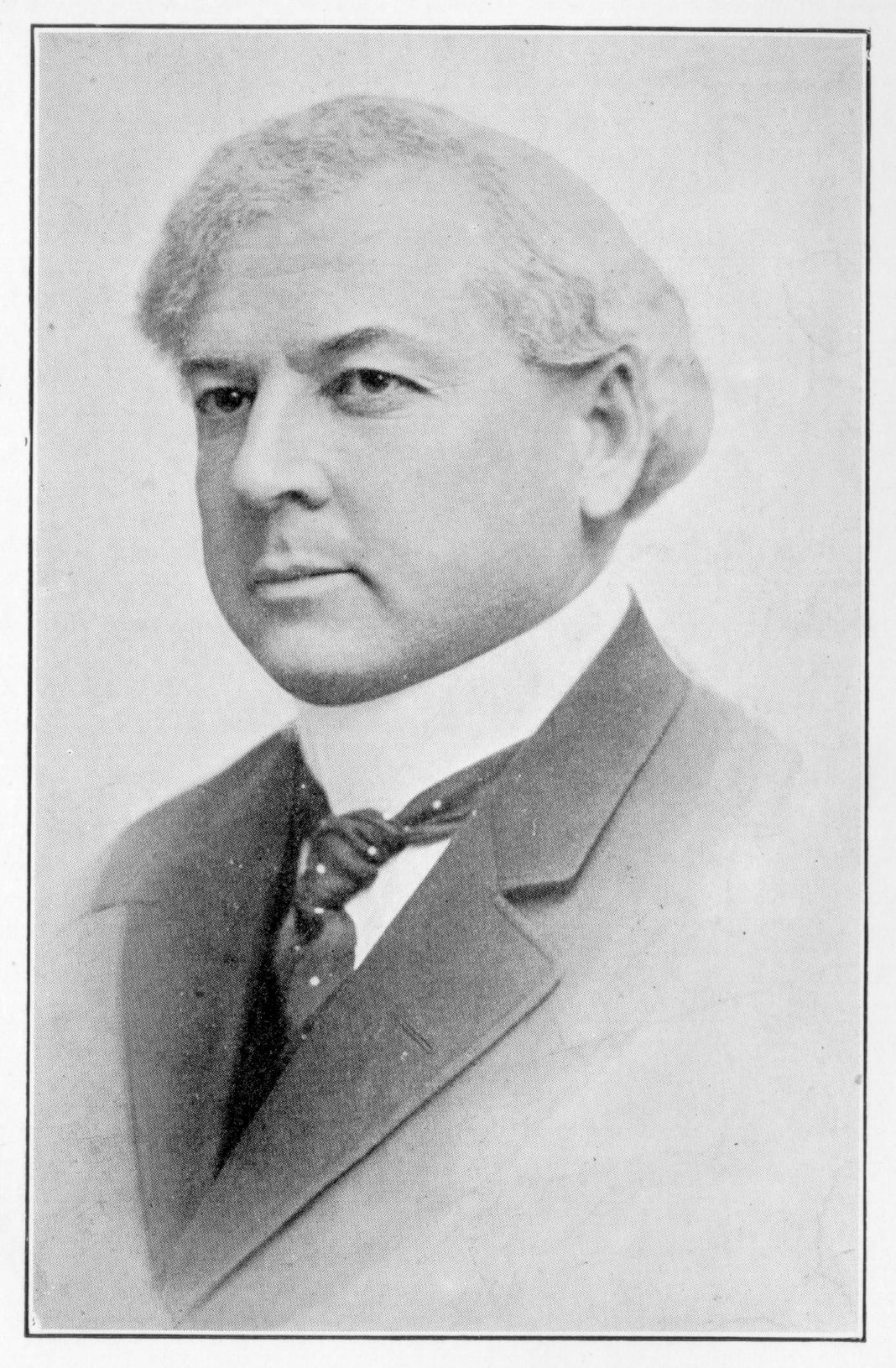

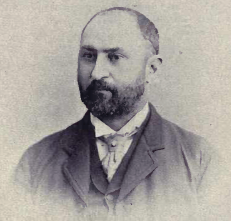
	First party	Second party
Leader	Richard McBride	Joseph Martin (de facto only) (Note: Martin resigned leadership on June 3, 1903. Party opted to not call a leadership convention in anticipation of imminent election call, leaving leadership question for the post election caucus to decide.)
Party	Conservative	Liberal
Leader since	June 1, 1903	October 3, 1903
Leader's seat	Dewdney	Vancouver City (lost seat)
Seats won	22	17
Popular vote	27,913	22,715
Percentage	46.43%	37.78%
	Third party	Fourth party
Leader	unknown	vacant
Party	Socialist	Labour
Leader since	unknown	vacant
Seats won	2	1
Popular vote	4,787	4,421
Percentage	7.96%	7.36%
Premier before election
Richard McBride
Conservative
Premier after election
Richard McBride
Conservative

The 1903 British Columbia general election was the tenth general election for the Canadian province of British Columbia. It was held to elect members of the Legislative Assembly of British Columbia (MLAs). The election was called on September 5, 1903, and held on October 3, 1903. The new legislature met for the first time on November 26, 1903.

This was the first election in British Columbia that was fought by political parties. Prior to this election, British Columbia politics were non-partisan.

The first election was dominated by the BC Conservative and Liberal parties, which were affiliated with existing parties at the federal level. (Note: See Conservative Party of Canada and Liberal Party of Canada.)

The Conservative Party won over 46% of the popular vote and a slim majority of the seats in the legislature.

An act was passed in 1902 to provide for an Assembly of 42 members, of which 31 were elected in single-member districts. Of the multi-member districts, Cariboo returned two MLAs, Victoria City four, and Vancouver City five. Each voter could cast as many votes as there were seats to fill in the multi-member districts.

== Results ==
Elections to the Legislative Assembly (1903)
Political party	Party leader	MLAs		Votes	
Political party	Party leader	Candidates (Note: First election with candidates nominated by organized political parties)	1903	#	%
Conservative	Richard McBride	41	22	27,913	46.43%
Liberal (Note: Three candidates campaigned under the Liberal–Labour banner)	Joseph Martin	39	17	22,715	37.78%
Socialist		10	2	4,787	7.96%
Labour (Note: Organized only at the riding level)		5	1	4,421	7.36%
Socialist Labor		1	–	284	0.47%
Total		95	42	60,120	100.00%
Acclamations		█ Conservative	1		
Acclamations		█ Liberal	1		

Seats and popular vote by party
Party	Seats	Votes
█ Conservative	22 / 42	46.43%
█ Liberal	17 / 42	37.78%
█ Socialist	2 / 42	7.96%
█ Labour	1 / 42	7.36%
█ Socialist Labor	0 / 42	0.47%

== Results by riding ==
The following MLAs were elected:

Alberni: William Wallace Burns McInnes Atlin: Henry Esson Young Cariboo: Harry Jones Cariboo: James Murphy Chilliwhack: Charles William Munro Columbia: Wilmer Cleveland Wells Comox: Robert Grant Cowichan: John Newell Evans Cranbrook: James Horace King Delta: John Oliver Dewdney: Richard McBride Esquimalt: Charles Edward Pooley Fernie: William Roderick Ross Grand Forks: George Arthur Fraser	Greenwood: John Robert Brown The Islands: Thomas Wilson Paterson Kamloops: Frederick John Fulton Kaslo: Robert Francis Green Lillooet: Archibald McDonald (Note: Election declared void at the end of the first session of the new Legislature. McDonald would win the subsequent byelection.) Nanaimo City: James Hurst Hawthornthwaite Nelson City: John Houston Newcastle: Parker Williams New Westminster City: Thomas Gifford Okanagan: Price Ellison Revelstoke: Thomas Taylor Richmond: Francis Lovett Carter-Cotton Rossland City: James Alexander MacDonald Saanich: Henry Ernest Tanner	Similkameen: Lytton Wilmot Shatford Skeena: Charles William Digby Clifford Slocan: William Davidson Vancouver City: Charles William John Bowser Vancouver City: James Ford Garden Vancouver City: Alexander Henry Boswell MacGowan Vancouver City: Robert Garnett Tatlow Vancouver City: Charles Wilson Victoria City: William George Cameron Victoria City: Robert Low Drury Victoria City: Richard Hall Victoria City: James Dugald McNiven (L-L) Yale: Stuart Alexander Henderson Ymir: Harry Wright

== See also ==
- List of political parties in Canada § British Columbia
