= Kergin =

Kergin may refer to:

- Kergin, Iran, a village in Kerman Province, Iran
- Herbert Frederick Kergin (1885-1954), Canadian political figure
- Michael Kergin (b. 1942), Canadian diplomat
- William Thomas Kergin (c. 1876–1961), Canadian political figure
