= Thomas Henry Kirk =

Canadian politician (1873–1940)

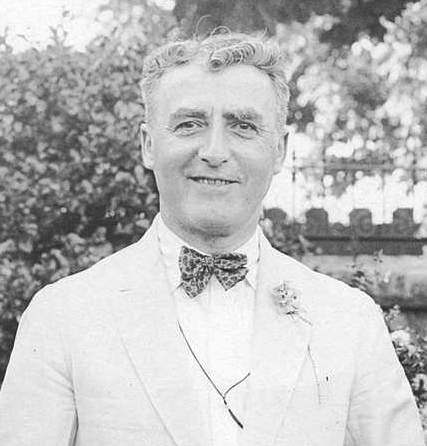
- Kirk pictured c. 1931

MLA for Vancouver City
- In office 1928–1933

Personal details
- Born: February 15, 1873 Dumfries, Scotland
- Died: October 3, 1940 (aged 67) Vancouver, British Columbia
- Party: Conservative

Thomas Henry Kirk (February 15, 1873 – October 3, 1940) was a Canadian politician. After being an unsuccessful candidate in the 1924 provincial election, he served in the Legislative Assembly of British Columbia from 1928 to 1933 from the electoral district of Vancouver City, as a Conservative. He was also an alderman on the Vancouver City Council.
