= William Dick (British Columbia politician) =

Canadian politician (1878–1961)

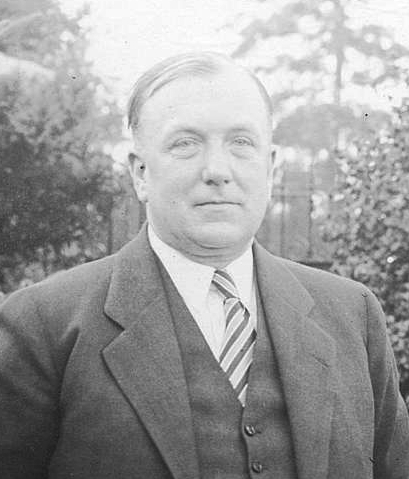
- Dick pictured c. 1931

MLA for Vancouver City
- In office 1928–1933

Personal details
- Born: September 1, 1878 Winnipeg, Manitoba
- Died: June 1, 1961 (aged 82) Burnaby, British Columbia
- Party: Conservative

William Robert Dick (September 1, 1878 – June 1, 1961) was a Canadian politician. He served in the Legislative Assembly of British Columbia from 1928 until his retirement at the 1933 provincial election, from the electoral district of Vancouver City, as a Conservative.
