= Kenneth Campbell (politician) =

Canadian politician (1881–1951)

MLA for Nelson
- In office 1922–1924

Personal details
- Born: March 26, 1881 Galterigill, Duirnish, Isle of Skye, Scotland
- Died: March 28, 1951 (aged 70) Vancouver, British Columbia
- Party: Liberal

Kenneth Campbell (March 26, 1881 – March 28, 1951) was a Canadian Liberal politician. He served in the Legislative Assembly of British Columbia from a 1922 byelection to 1924 for the electoral district of Nelson, resigning after being elected in 1924 to allow his leader to sit in the Assembly. He was a businessman and manager of the Kootenay Granite and Monumental Company.
