= Adolphus Williams =

Canadian politician

Adolphus Williams (July 18, 1844 – September 3, 1921) was a lawyer, magistrate and political figure in British Columbia, Canada. He represented Vancouver City in the Legislative Assembly of British Columbia from 1894 until his retirement at the 1898 provincial election. He never sought provincial office again.

He was born in Aylmer, Canada West, the son of doctor Adolphus Williams, a native of London, England and Jane Burdick, and was educated in St. Thomas and at the Toronto University. Williams fought at the Battle of Ridgeway in 1866. He studied law in Toronto and began practising in Welland, moving to Vancouver in 1889. Williams served as a representative on the Welland County council. He first married Maria Vanderlip and married Katherine Wylie Raeburn in 1890. In 1903, he was named a police magistrate. Williams died in Vancouver at the age of 77.
