= James Stables =

Canadian politician

MLA for Cassiar
- In office 1900–1903

Personal details
- Born: November 25, 1860 Kildrummy, Aberdeen, Scotland
- Died: February 17, 1926 (aged 65) Vancouver, British Columbia, Canada
- Party: Unknown

James Stables (November 25, 1860 – February 17, 1926) was a Scottish-Canadian politician. He served in the Legislative Assembly of British Columbia from 1900 until his retirement at the 1903 provincial election, from the electoral district of Cassiar. He never sought provincial office again.

== Election results ==
1900 British Columbia general election: Cassiar
| Party | Candidate | Votes | % | Elected |
|---|---|---|---|---|
| Conservative-Opposition | Charles William Digby Clifford | 318 | 30.67 | ✓ |
| Unknown | James Stables^{3} | 277 | 26.71 | ✓ |
| Independent Opposition | John Irving | 244 | 23.53 | |
| Unknown | Alexander Godfrey^{3} | 198 | 19.09 | |
| Total valid votes | | 1,037 | 100.00 | |
^{3} Neither Godfrey nor Stables' affiliation were mentioned in the newspapers. Stables may have been an Independent Government supporter.
