= James Ramsay (Canadian politician) =

Canadian politician

James Ramsay (December 16, 1866 – November 22, 1935) was a Scottish-born merchant and political figure in British Columbia. He represented Vancouver City in the Legislative Assembly of British Columbia from 1920 to 1924 as a Liberal.

He was born in Aberdeenshire and later operated a stationery store in Scotland. In 1891, he opened a factory in Victoria, British Columbia. Ramsay moved to Victoria six months later, establishing a company that manufactured biscuits, candies and syrup. Ramsay was a Vancouver alderman for 7 years and chair of the Vancouver School Board for 10 years. He was also president of the local YMCA, president of the Canadian and British Columbia Manufacturer's Association and served on the board for the Vancouver General Hospital and on the Vancouver Board of Trade. Ramsay died in Vancouver at the age of 68.

His company's warehouse in Vancouver has been designated as a heritage building by the city of Vancouver.
