= George Ratcliffe Naden =

Canadian politician

George Ratcliffe Naden (May 7, 1865 – November 30, 1953) was an English-born financial and insurance agent and political figure in British Columbia, Canada. He represented Greenwood in the Legislative Assembly of British Columbia from 1907 to 1909 as a Liberal.

He was born in Hartington, Derbyshire, the son of John Naden and Esther Hope, and was educated there. In 1894, Naden married Margaret Dunn. He served as alderman for Greenwood and was mayor in 1902 and from 1904 to 1906. He died in Victoria.
