= Edwin C. Smith =

Canadian politician

Edwin Cleghorn Smith (1852 – May 16, 1924) was a miner, rancher and political figure in British Columbia. He represented East Kootenay South in the Legislative Assembly of British Columbia from 1900 to 1903. His name also appears as Edwin Clarke Smith.

He was born in Michigan and educated at Ashswamp Academy there. Smith came to British Columbia in 1893. He took part of the discovery of the Sullivan Mine in Kimberley and became one of the owners. He ran unsuccessfully as a Liberal for the Fernie seat in the assembly in 1903. He never sought provincial office again. He died in Cranbrook at the age of 73.
