= George Arthur Benjamin Hall =

Canadian politician

George Arthur Benjamin Hall (October 29, 1868 – November 5, 1948) was a physician and political figure in British Columbia. After being defeated in the 1900 provincial election, he represented Nelson City in the Legislative Assembly of British Columbia from 1907 to 1909 as a Liberal. He did not seek a second term in the 1909 provincial election.

He was born in Ottawa, Ontario, the son of Lewis Hall and Elizabeth Beardsmore, and came to British Columbia with his parents at the age of seven. He was educated in British Columbia and at the Philadelphia Dental College. Hall practiced as a dentist in Nanaimo for two years and then continued his medical studies at Cooper Medical College in San Francisco, at the New York Polyclinic and at Johns Hopkins University. He then set up practice in Nelson. In 1893, he married Christina Pool. Hall was resident physician for the Canadian Pacific Railway, provincial health officer and jail physician. He was also superintendent of the Kootenay Lake General Hospital for three years. Hall served during World War I. He returned to Nanaimo after the war and was mayor from 1930 to 1931. He opened a medical clinic in Nanaimo in 1936 with his two sons and another doctor. Hall later retired to Victoria. He died in Lantzville at the age of 80.
