= Mary Ellen Smith =

Canadian politician

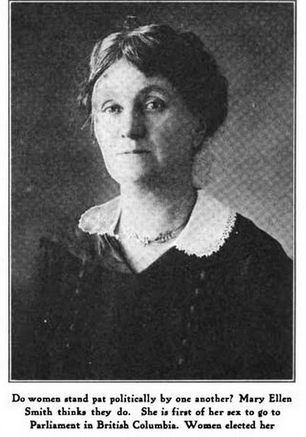
- Mary Ellen Smith, from a 1918 publication

Member of the Legislative Assembly of British Columbia for Vancouver City
- In office January 1918 – June 7, 1928

Personal details
- Born: Mary Ellen Spear; October 11, 1863 Tavistock, Devon, England
- Died: May 3, 1933 (aged 69) Vancouver, British Columbia, Canada
- Party: Liberal
- Spouse: Ralph Smith (m. 1883; died 1917)

Mary Ellen Spear Smith (October 11, 1863 – May 3, 1933) was a politician in British Columbia, Canada. She was the first female Member of the Legislative Assembly (MLA) in the Legislative Assembly of British Columbia in 1918, and both the first female cabinet minister and the first female Acting Speaker and the first woman cabinet minister in the British Empire.

== Early life ==
Smith was born Mary Ellen Spear in Tavistock, Devon, England. Her mother was Mary Spear and father, Richard Spear, was a copper miner. She became a school teacher before marrying Ralph Smith, a widower, coal miner and unionist, in 1883. The couple had five children together, one daughter and four sons. She moved with him to British Columbia in the early 1891 shortly after their marriage, settling first in Nanaimo and then moving to Vancouver in 1911.

== Career ==
She was an activist as a member of the Suffrage League of Canada, member of the Dominion Board of Mental Hygiene, president of the Women's Canadian Club and of the Women's Forum, regent of the Imperial Order Daughters of the Empire, and an executive member of the Canadian Red Cross. She also raised money for war veterans, and helped establish factories to employ blind children. She founded the "Laurier Liberal Club", and was an active Methodist.

Her husband, Ralph Smith, was a moderate trade union leader. He was elected to the BC legislature in 1898. He was elected to the House of Commons of Canada in the 1900 federal election. He returned to the BC legislature, and became British Columbia's Minister of Finance in 1916. Mary Ellen Smith helped her husband's political career by campaigning for him and making speeches on his behalf when he was unavailable.

Ralph Smith died in February 1917, and Mary Ellen Smith ran to succeed him as Member of the Legislative Assembly (MLA) for Vancouver in a January 1918 by-election. She ran as an "Independent Liberal" on the slogan "Women and children first". She was elected by a wide margin, becoming the first woman in the BC Legislature.

She said in a speech in the Legislature that "Not only did the women of my fair city stand behind me... but the men were there, too."

She was re-elected as a Liberal candidate in the 1920 and 1924 general elections.

As a legislator, she introduced the Minimum Wage Act of 1918, a law establishing a minimum wage for women of $12.77 per week. Smith helped enact laws establishing juvenile courts, allowing women to sit as judges, and passing laws protecting women in the workplace. She also worked to pass the Mothers' Pension Act in 1924, later renamed the Mothers' Allowances Act in 1937. This act provided divorced, deserted or widowed wives with guaranteed monthly income to raise children under the age of sixteen.

Smith also supported anti-Asian and eugenicist politics in British Columbia, including the Women and Girls’ Protection Act of 1923, which restricted their employment by Asians. She also advocated the sterilization of the feeble-minded lest their reproduction contribute to ‘race suicide’. She accepted the racial science of her day that justified legislation efforts to "protect our own [Anglo-Canadian] race." (as cited in Kerwin, 1999, p. 95). By embracing racism and eugenics within her feminism, Smith reflected the ideals of feminists of her era.

She joined the cabinet of Premier John Oliver in 1921 as minister without portfolio, but resigned after eight months as she felt that the rules of cabinet solidarity restricted her independence and she was never assigned to a dedicated portfolio. She was the first woman in British commonwealth to hold a seat in a government cabinet.

On February 22, 1928 she served as Acting Speaker of the Legislative Assembly, the first woman to hold the position of Speaker in the British Empire. She was defeated in the 1928 election that brought down the Liberal government. For that election, she left her Vancouver riding and ran instead in the riding of Esquimalt on Vancouver Island.

In 1929, she was appointed Canada's delegate to the International Labour Organization conference in Geneva.

She served as president of the BC Liberal Party in the early 1930s until her death due to a stroke in Vancouver on May 3, 1933 at the age of 69.

== Legacy ==
Smith's work to promote the rights of women and girls has been commemorated in feminist literature and in the public after her death, but her links to eugenics and anti-Asian policies were largely downplayed until recent decades.

In 2007, Smith was named a National Historic Person by the government of Canada. In Nanaimo the street Mary Ellen Drive, located between Dover Bay Road and the Island Highway, is named in her honour.

Mary Ellen Smith is also commemorated by the Legislative Assembly of British Columbia recognizing her as the first female MLA in British Columbia, the first female to be appointed a minister without portfolio in the British Empire, and as a campaigner for women's rights.
