= Hugh Bowie Gilmour =

Canadian politician

Hugh Bowie Gilmour (November 1, 1861 – January 23, 1934) was a mechanical engineer and political figure in British Columbia. He represented Vancouver City in the Legislative Assembly of British Columbia from 1900 to 1903. He did not seek a second term in the 1903 provincial election.

He was born in Toronto, the son of Robert Gilmour and Lizzie Bowie. In 1882, he married Alfreda Nester. He served on Vancouver City Council in 1899. In 1917, he was named as a commissioner on the first Workmen's Compensation Board of British Columbia; he served until his death in Vancouver at the age of 72.

Gilmore station on the SkyTrain system is located at Gilmore Avenue, which was named (misspelled) after Gilmour.
