= William Thomas Kergin =

Canadian politician

William Thomas Kergin (May 17, 1876 – July 21, 1961) was a Canadian physician and political figure in British Columbia. He represented Skeena in the Legislative Assembly of British Columbia from 1907 until his defeat in the 1909 provincial election as a Liberal.

He was born in St. Catharines, Ontario to William Henry Kergin, a carpenter and joiner from Ireland, and Margaret Emmett, born in Ontario to Irish immigrants. He received his medical degree from the University of Toronto. Kergin interned at the Grace Hospital and later moved to Western Canada. He was in charge of hospitals at Port Simpson and Port Essington, moving to Prince Rupert in 1910 where he practised in partnership with his brother. He married Fanny Simpson. Kergin retired from the practice of medicine in 1940. He died in New Westminster at the age of 85.
