= John Robert Jackson =

Canadian politician

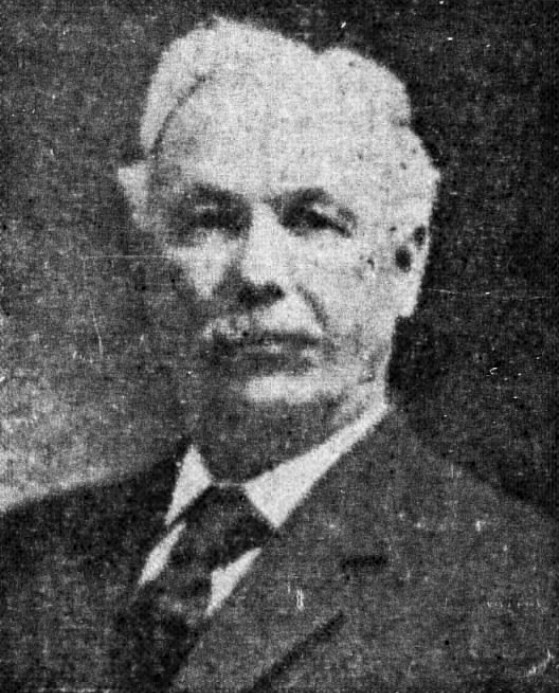

Member of the Legislative Assembly of British Columbia
- In office 1909–1916
- Constituency: Greenwood

Personal details
- Born: March 22, 1859 Drumheart, County Cavan, Ireland
- Died: January 20, 1925 (aged 65) Merritt, British Columbia
- Party: Conservative
- Spouse: Agnes Barbour (m. 1900)
- Occupation: Rancher, politician

John Robert Jackson (March 22, 1859 – January 20, 1925) was an Irish-born rancher and political figure in British Columbia. He represented Greenwood in the Legislative Assembly of British Columbia from 1909 to 1916 as a Conservative.

He was born in Drumheart, County Cavan, the son of William Jackson, and was educated in Corlisbratten. Jackson came to Ontario in 1871 and to British Columbia in 1885. In 1900, he married Agnes Barbour. Jackson was defeated by future Premier John Duncan MacLean when he ran for reelection in 1916 and again in 1920. He died in Merritt at the age of 65.
