= Henry Holgate Watson =

Canadian politician

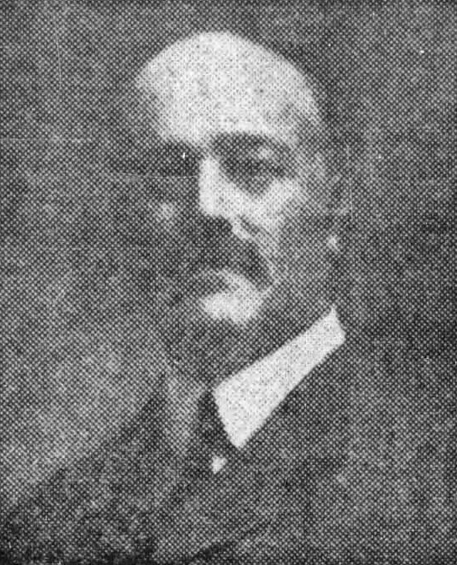

Member of the Legislative Assembly of British Columbia
- In office 1909–1916
- Constituency: Vancouver City

Personal details
- Born: December 25, 1867 Milton, Ontario
- Died: January 19, 1949 (aged 81) Vancouver, British Columbia
- Party: Conservative
- Spouse: Kathleen Constance Black (m. 1892)
- Education: Upper Canada College
- Occupation: Druggist, politician

Henry Holgate Watson (December 25, 1867 – January 19, 1949) was a druggist and political figure in British Columbia. He represented Vancouver City from 1909 to 1916 in the Legislative Assembly of British Columbia as a Conservative. He did not seek a third term in the Legislature in the 1916 provincial election.

He was born in Milton, Ontario, the son of Henry Watson and Jane Elizabeth Holgate, and was educated in Milton and at Upper Canada College. In 1892, Watson married Kathleen Constance Black. He died in Vancouver at the age of 81.
