= Vancouver City (provincial electoral district) =

Defunct provincial electoral district in British Columbia, Canada

Vancouver City was a provincial electoral district of British Columbia, Canada. It was a multiple member district based in the newly created city of Vancouver.

It did not appear on the hustings until the 1890 election — the city only having been chartered and named in the year of the previous election when the locality was a small polling area of the New Westminster (provincial electoral district) riding. It is a sign of Vancouver's rapid growth that by 1890 there were over 300 electors, by 1900 there were 15,000, by 1903 over 25,000 votes cast; prior to 1885, the population of the waterside village of Granville, BI (Burrard Inlet, a postal address shared by Moodyville, New Brighton and Barnet) had been in the range of 300.

When the district was created, it had two members, but because of population increase, it was made a three-member district prior to the 1894 election, a four-member district prior to the 1898 election, and a five-member district in 1903. By 1920, with Vancouver having grown to 200,000 inhabitants, the district became a six-member seat with about 40,000 voting and over 200,000 votes cast. Under the block voting system in use, each voter could cast as many votes as there were seats to fill.

After the 1928 election, it was given nine MLAs and redistributed into four districts, three with two members each (Vancouver-Burrard, Vancouver Centre and Vancouver East) and Vancouver-Point Grey with three members.

== Demographics ==
Population, 1961
Population change, 1871–1961
Area (km^{2})
Population density (people per km^{2})

== Political geography and history ==
Vancouver City was a multi seat district, electing from two to six MLAs, before being dismantled in 1928.

Each voter could cast as many votes as there were seats to fill in the district.

In most of the elections from 1903, when party labels were first used formally, to 1920, the Block Voting system in use meant that one party took all of the city's seats. But in most cases, that one party took less than half the votes.

From 1903 to 1912, the Conservative party took all of the Vancouver City seats each time, with the most popular Conservative candidate taking less than 11 percent of votes cast. (This shows the "windshield wiper" effect of block voting.)

In 1916 and 1920, the Liberal party took five of Vancouver City's six seats, with a Conservatives taking one seat.

In 1924, the Liberal party took five of Vancouver City's six seats, with a "Provincial Party" candidate taking one seat.

In 1928, the Conservative party took all six of Vancouver City's seats.

Following the 1928 election, Vancouver City was converted into four new districts, electing a total of 9 MLAs.

== Notable MLAs ==
- Joseph Martin, 13th premier of British Columbia
- William John Bowser, 17th premier of British Columbia
- Charles A. Woodward, founder of Woodward's and father of W.C. "Billy" Woodward, later Lieutenant-Governor, and grandfather of Charles N. "Chunky" Woodward.

== Electoral history ==
Note: winners in each election in bold.

1890 British Columbia general election
Party	Candidate	Votes	%	±%	Expenditures	Elected
Opposition	Francis Lovett Carter-Cotton (Note: Vancouver publisher (Vancouver Province newspaper) and mayoral contender)	1,123	36.07%	–	Unknown	✓
Independent	James Welton Horne (Note: Promoter of the "Great Land Sale" in 1891 in Mission City)	695	22.33%	–	Unknown	✓
Opposition	Samuel Greer (Note: Landowner at "Greer's Beach", now Kitsilano Beach)	649	20.85%	–	Unknown	
Government	James M. Fox	33	1.06%	–	Unknown	
Opposition	James Orr	135	4.34%	–	Unknown	
Independent	Robert Garnett Tatlow	478	15.35%		Unknown	
Total valid votes		3,113	100.00%			
Total rejected ballots						
Turnout		%				

1894 British Columbia general election
Party	Candidate	Votes	%	±%	Expenditures	Elected
Opposition	**Adolphus Williams**	**1,911**	**23.51%**	–	Unknown	✓
Opposition (Nationalist Party)	**Robert Macpherson**	**1,766**	**21.73%**	–	Unknown	✓
Opposition	**Francis Lovett Carter-Cotton**	**1,736**	**21.36%**		Unknown	✓
Government	Robert Alexander Anderson	920	11.32%	–	Unknown	
Government	Robert Garnett Tatlow	979	12.05%	–	Unknown	
Independent	Samuel Greer	208	2.56%		Unknown	
Government	Edward Odlum	607	7.47%	–	Unknown	
Total valid votes		8,127	100.00%			
Total rejected ballots						
Turnout		%				

1898 British Columbia general election
Party	Candidate	Votes	%	±%	Expenditures	Elected
Opposition	Charles Edward Tisdall	1,798	16.91%	–	Unknown	✓
Opposition (Nationalist Party)	Robert Macpherson	1,795	16.88%	–	Unknown	✓
Opposition	Francis Lovett Carter-Cotton	1,667	15.67%	–	Unknown	✓
Opposition	Joseph Martin	1,651	15.52%	–	Unknown	✓
Government	William John Bowser	879	8.26%	–	Unknown	
Government	John T. Carroll	954	8.97%	–	Unknown	
Government	James Ford Garden	1,157	10.88%	–	Unknown	
Government	William Seaman McDonald	735	6.91%	–	Unknown	
Total valid votes		10,636	100.00%			
Total rejected ballots						
Turnout		%				

1900 British Columbia general election
Party	Candidate	Votes	%	Elected
Conservative	James Ford Garden	1,787	11.67	✓
Government	Joseph Martin (Note: 13th premier of British Columbia)	1,737	11.34	✓
Opposition	Robert Garnett Tatlow	1,645	10.74	✓
Conservative	Hugh Bowie Gilmour	1,465	9.57	✓
Conservative	Charles Wilson	1,457	9.51	
Independent government	Robert Macpherson	1,435	9.37	
Government	James McQueen	1,391	9.08	
Conservative	William Henry Wood	1,344	8.78	
Independent Labour	Joseph Dixon	853	5.57	
Progressive	Francis Lovett Carter-Cotton	802	5.24	
Labour	Francis Williams	716	4.67	
Independent Labour	William MacClain	683	4.46	
Total valid votes		15,315	100.00	

1903 British Columbia general election
Party	Candidate	Votes	%	Elected
Conservative	Robert Garnett Tatlow	2,660	10.64	✓
Conservative	James Ford Garden	2,464	9.86	✓
Conservative	Charles Wilson	2,416	9.66	✓
Conservative	William John Bowser	2,304	9.2	✓
Conservative	Alexander Henry Boswell MacGowan	2,300	9.20	✓
Liberal	Joseph Martin	1,546	6.18	
Liberal	William Disbrow Brydone-Jack	1,461	5.84	
Liberal	Truman Smith Baxter	1,411	5.64	
Vancouver (Independent) Labour	Francis Williams	1,357	5.43	
Socialist	John Thomas Mortimer	1,328	5.31	
Vancouver (Independent) Labour	Albert George Perry	1,248	4.99	
Liberal	James Douglas Turnbull	1,193	4.77	
Vancouver (Independent) Labour	John McLaren	1,164	4.66	
Socialist	Albion Rovert Stebbings	956	3.82	
Liberal	Clarence Monck	910	3.64	
Socialist Labour (Note: William Griffiths is listed as a member of the Socialist Labour party, but it is unclear whether this is in any way related to the British Columbia Socialist Labour Party of the 1940s.)	William Griffiths	284	1.14	
Total valid votes		25,002	100.00	
Source: http://www.elections.bc.ca/docs/rpt/1871-1986_ElectoralHistoryofBC.pdf

1907 British Columbia general election
Party	Candidate	Votes	%	±%	Expenditures	Elected
Conservative	William John Bowser	3,152	10.45%	–	Unknown	✓
Conservative	Alexander Henry Boswell MacGowan	3,141	10.41%	–	Unknown	✓
Conservative	Robert Garnet Tatlow (Note: Spelled Garnet on this ballot, Garnett in other years)	3,136	10.39%	–	Unknown	✓
Conservative	James Ford Garden	3,080	10.21%	–	Unknown	✓
Conservative	George Albert McGuire	2,994	9.92%	–	Unknown	✓
Liberal	Robert Purvis McLennan	2,316	7.68%		Unknown	
Liberal	Alexander Henderson	2,248	7.45%		Unknown	
Liberal	William Wallace Burns McInnes	2,233	7.40%		Unknown	
Liberal	John Wallace deBeque Farris	2,096	6.95%		Unknown	
Liberal	Thomas Fletcher Neelands	2,063	6.84%		Unknown	
Socialist	Eugene Thornton Kingsley	617	2.04%	–	Unknown	
Socialist	James Hackett McVety	616	2.04%	–	Unknown	
Socialist	Richard Parmater Pettipiece	602	1.99%	–	Unknown	
Socialist	John Edward Dubberley	599	1.99%	–	Unknown	
Socialist	Albion Robert Stebbings	598	1.98%	–	Unknown	
Canadian Labour Party of BC	Francis Williams	401	1.33%		Unknown	
Canadian Labour Party of BC	Albert George Perry	281	0.93%		Unknown	
Total valid votes		30,173	100.00%			
Total rejected ballots						
Turnout		%				

=== 1909 election ===
12th 1909 British Columbia general election
Party	Candidate	Votes	%	±	Expenditures
**Conservative**	**William John Bowser**	**5,441**	**10.60%**		Unknown
Liberal	John Bell Campbell	3,227	6.29%		Unknown
Socialist	Peter Garvie	1,227	2.39%	–	Unknown
Socialist	Eugene Thornton Kingsley	1,883	3.67%	–	Unknown
Liberal	George Ernest MacDonald	3,984	7.76%		Unknown
**Conservative**	**Alexander Henry Boswell MacGowan**	**3,141**	**10.41%**		Unknown
Socialist	Moses McGregor	1,218	2.37%	–	Unknown
Conservative	George Albert McGuire	**4,826**	**9.41%**		Unknown
Socialist	William Murray MacKenzie	1,231	2.40%	–	Unknown
Socialist	Richard Parmater Pettipiece	1,428	2.78%	–	Unknown
Liberal	John Harold Senkler	4,110	8.01%		Unknown
Liberal	James Stables	3,356	6.54%		Unknown
**Conservative**	**Charles Edward Tisdall**	**2,063**	**6.84%**		Unknown
Liberal	Frederick Coate Wade	3,942	7.68%		Unknown
**Conservative**	**Henry Holgate Watson**	**5,202**	**10.14%**		Unknown
Total valid votes		51,316	100.00%		
Total rejected ballots					
Turnout		%			

13th 1912 British Columbia general election
Party	Candidate	Votes	%	±	Expenditures
Socialist	William Bennett	1,134	2.45%	–	Unknown
**Conservative**	**William John Bowser**	**5,101**	**11.02%**		Unknown
Liberal	Cameron William Smith	2,716	5.87%		Unknown
Liberal	Joseph Nealon Ellis	2,619	5.66%		Unknown
Liberal	Charles William Enright	2,947	6.37%		Unknown
Independent	Samuel Greer	897	1.94%		Unknown
Socialist	Joseph Patrick Lord	1,133	2.45%	–	Unknown
Socialist	John Amos MacDonald	1,263	2.73%	–	Unknown
**Conservative**	**Alexander Henry Boswell MacGowan**	**5,061**	**10.93%**		Unknown
**Conservative**	**George Albert McGuire**	**5,114**	**11.05%**		Unknown
Socialist	WilliamArthur Pritchard	1,081	2.34%	–	Unknown
Socialist	John Reid	1,156	2.50%	–	Unknown
Liberal	Ralph Smith	3,257	7.04%		Unknown
Liberal	William Maxwell Smith	2,744	5.93%		Unknown
**Conservative**	**Charles Edward Tisdall**	**5,085**	**10.97%**		Unknown
**Conservative**	**Henry Holgate Watson**	**4,977**	**10.75%**		Unknown
Total valid votes		46,285	100.00%		
Total rejected ballots					
Turnout		%			

1916 British Columbia general election
Party	Candidate	Votes	%	Elected
Liberal	Malcolm Archibald Macdonald	9,119	9.53	✓
Liberal	Ralph Smith	8,106	8.47	✓
Liberal	John William MacIntosh	8,096	8.46	✓
Liberal	John Wallace deBeque Farris	7,881	8.23	✓
Conservative	William John Bowser	7,421	7.75	✓
Liberal	John Sedgwick Cowper	7,056	7.37	✓
Liberal	Patrick Donnelly	7,005	7.32	
Conservative	Charles Edward Tisdall	6,922	7.23	
Conservative	Thomas Duke	6,395	6.68	
Conservative	George Albert McGuire	6,270	6.55	
Conservative	Walter Leek	6,136	6.41	
Conservative	Alexander Henry Boswell MacGowan	5,906	6.17	
Independent Labour	Charles Edward Tisdall	2,487	2.60	
Independent Conservative	Robert Cassidy	2,451	2.56	
Independent	Harold George White	1,416	1.48	
Socialist	John David Harrington	1,380	1.44	
Independent	Edwin Clarke Appleby	743	0.78	
Independent	Arthur Freeman Fawcett	665	0.69	
Independent Conservative	Thomas Owen Townley	250	0.26	
Total valid votes		95,705	100.00	

1920 British Columbia general election
Party	Candidate	Votes	%	Elected
Liberal	Mary Ellen Smith	17,510	8.66	✓
Liberal	Ian Alistair MacKenzie	13,840	6.84	✓
Liberal	John Wallace deBeque Farris	12,550	6.21	✓
Liberal	James Ramsay	12,279	6.07	✓
Liberal	Malcolm Archibald Macdonald	12,222	6.04	✓
Conservative	William John Bowser	11,617	5.75	✓
Conservative	George Black	10,379	5.13	
Liberal	John Patrick Dougherty	10,388	5.14	
Conservative	John Weightman Warden	10,278	5.08	
Conservative	Samuel Lyness Howe	9,913	4.90	
Conservative	Edith Louise Paterson	9,573	4.73	
Independent	Joseph Martin	9,123	4.51	
Conservative	John Wesley Mahan	8,810	4.36	
Federated Labour	William Robert Trotter	7,481	3.70	
Federated Labour	James Shaver Woodsworth	7,444	3.68	
Federated Labour	Thomas Richardson	7,192	3.56	
Independent	Moses Brewins Cotworth	5,511	2.73	
Women's Freedom	Esther Margaret Crosfield	4,166	2.06	
Vancouver Rentpayers	George Johnson Ashworth	3,291	1.63	
Socialist	John David Harrington	2,956	1.46	
United Veterans	John Livingstone Millar	2,808	1.39	
United Veterans	Percival Horace North	2,633	1.30	
Socialist	James Ferguson Smith	2,267	1.12	
Socialist	Christopher Stephenson	1,818	0.90	
Socialist	Sidney Earp	1,694	0.84	
Socialist	William McQuoid	1,524	0.75	
Independent	Thomas Turberville	1,487	0.74	
Socialist	John Dennis	1,451	0.72	
Total valid votes		202,205	100.00	

16th British Columbia election, 1924
Party	Candidate	Votes	%	±	Expenditures
Conservative	William John Bowser	7,818	4.12%		Unknown
Independent Conservative	Robert Cassidy	276	0.15%		Unknown
Canadian Labour Party	Wilfred Harry Cottrell	6,314	3.33%		Unknown
Provincial	**Andrew McCreight Creery**	**9,071**	**4.78%**		Unknown
Canadian Labour Party	William Dunn	5,752	3.03%		Unknown
Liberal	John Wallace deBeque Farris	8,427	4.44%		Unknown
Provincial	Jessie Columbia Hall	8,749	4.61%	–	Unknown
Socialist	John David Harrington	3,281	1.73%	–	Unknown
Conservative	Samuel Lyness Howe	7,250	3.82%		Unknown
Conservative	Thomas Henry Kirk	7,686	4.05%		Unknown
Socialist	Henry McEvoy	750	0.40%	–	Unknown
Canadian Labour Party	Angus McInnis	5,897	3.11%		Unknown
**Liberal**	**Ian Alistair MacKenzie**	**9,476**	**4.99%**		Unknown
Provincial	Alexander Duncan McRae	9,008	4.75%	–	Unknown
**Liberal**	**Christopher McRae**	**9,778**	**5.15%**		Unknown
Provincial	Donald Edgar McTaggart	8,924	4.70	–	Unknown
Conservative	Royal Lethington Maitland	8,417	4.44%		Unknown
Canadian Labour Party	Edmund Henry Morrison	5,613	2.96%		Unknown
**Liberal**	**Victor Wentworth Odlum**	**10,011**	**5.28%**		Unknown
Independent Liberal	Guy Cathcart Pelton	225	0.12%		Unknown
Conservative	Perry Douglas Roe	7,222	3.81%		Unknown
Provincial	Francis William Rounsefell	8,407	4.43%	–	Unknown
Conservative	Emma Wood Scott	7,292	3.84%		Unknown
Provincial	George Gower Birt Showler	7,437	3.92%	–	Unknown
**Liberal**	**Mary Ellen Smith**	**9,251**	**4.88%**		Unknown
Canadian Labour Party	Priscilla Janet Smith	6,078	3.20%		Unknown
**Liberal**	**Charles Woodward**	**11,318**	**5.97%**		Unknown
Total valid votes		189,728	100.00%		
Total rejected ballots					
Turnout		%			

17th British Columbia election, 1928
Party	Candidate	Votes	%	±	Expenditures
Liberal	Henry Elston Almond	11,818	6.56%		Unknown
**Conservative**	**William Dick**	**15,968**	**8.86%**		Unknown
Liberal	Dugald Donaghy	13,176	7.31%		Unknown
Liberal	John Pitcairn Hogg	10,948	6.08%		Unknown
**Conservative**	**Thomas Henry Kirk**	**15,943**	**8.85%**		Unknown
Independent Labour Party	Angus McInnis	6,026	3.34%		Unknown
**Conservative**	**Royal Lethington Maitland**	**16,499**	**9.16%**		Unknown
Independent Liberal	Guy Cathcart Pelton	976	0.54%		Unknown
**Conservative**	**William Curtis Shelly**	**17,486**	**9.70%**		Unknown
Independent Labour Party	Robert Skinner	4,223	2.34%		Unknown
Liberal	Helen Douglas Smith	12,514	6.94%		Unknown
**Conservative**	**Nelson Spencer**	**16,717**	**9.28%**		Unknown
Liberal	Frederick William Sterling	11,045	6.13%		Unknown
Liberal	Nicholas Thompson	11,101	6.16%		Unknown
**Conservative**	**George Alexander Walkem**	**15,769**	**8.75%**		Unknown
Total valid votes		180,209	100.00%		
Total rejected ballots		425			
Turnout		%			

Vancouver City last appeared in the 1928 election. For the 1933 general election, Vancouver City was redistributed into:

- Vancouver-Burrard
- Vancouver Centre
- Vancouver East
- Vancouver-Point Grey

== See also ==
- List of British Columbia provincial electoral districts
- Canadian provincial electoral districts
- Vancouver (electoral districts)

== Notes ==
Legislative Assembly of British Columbia
Preceded by Yale West; Victoria City	Constituency represented by the premier of British Columbia; 1900; 1915–1916	Succeeded by South Nanaimo; Alberni
