= Malcolm Archibald Macdonald =

Canadian politician

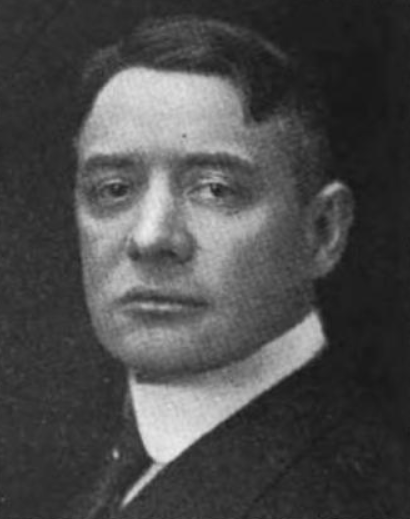

Chief Justice of the British Columbia Court of Appeal
- In office May 1940 – October 13, 1941

Justice of the British Columbia Court of Appeal
- In office 1924 – May 1940

Member of the Legislative Assembly of British Columbia
- In office 1916–1921
- Constituency: Vancouver City

Personal details
- Born: June 20, 1875 Ashfield Township, Ontario
- Died: October 13, 1941 (aged 66) Vancouver, British Columbia
- Resting place: Mountain View Cemetery
- Party: Liberal
- Spouses: Lena Baird (m. 1910; died 1913) Ida Williams (m. 1916)
- Children: Alex Macdonald
- Education: Osgoode Hall Law School
- Occupation: Jurist, politician

Malcolm Archibald Macdonald (June 20, 1875 – October 13, 1941) was a Canadian lawyer, politician and Chief Justice of British Columbia.

== Biography ==
Malcolm Archibald Macdonald was born in Ashfield Township on June 20, 1875. He graduated from Osgoode Hall Law School in 1909 and began the practice of law in London, Ontario. He moved to Cranbrook, British Columbia where he ran for the Liberal Party unsuccessfully in 1909. He moved again to Vancouver in 1912 where he was elected in 1916. He served as the Attorney General of British Columbia from November 29, 1916 to May 14, 1917. He was re-elected in 1920 but resigned in 1921 to run federally (without success), after which he resumed private practice. He was appointed to the British Columbia Court of Appeal in May 1924. He was appointed Chief Justice of British Columbia in May 1940 and died at his home in Vancouver on October 13, 1941. He was buried in Mountain View Cemetery.

== Personal life ==
He married Lena Baird on October 26, 1910. They had one son together. She died on August 11, 1913. He then remarried, to Ida Williams, on January 1, 1916.

His son James Macdonald also served on the Court of Appeal from 1979 and his son Alex Macdonald was Attorney General from 1972 to 1975.

1921 Canadian federal election: Burrard
Party	Candidate	Votes	%	±%
Conservative	John Arthur Clark	12,240	55.89	–
Liberal	Malcolm Archibald Macdonald	6,960	31.78	+7.03
Independent	John David Harrington	2,699	12.33	–
Total valid votes		21,899	100.00	
Total rejected ballots		–		
Turnout		21,899	61.75	–35.10
Eligible voters		35,463		
Conservative gain from Government (Liberal–Unionist)		Swing		–
Source: Library of Parliament
