= Charles William Munro =

Canadian politician

Charles William Munro (March 15, 1864 – January 27, 1919) was a political figure in British Columbia. He represented Westminster-Chilliwhack from 1898 to 1903 and Chilliwhack from 1903 until his defeat in 1909 as a Liberal.

He was born in Dundas County, Canada West, the son of Asael Munro and Charlotte Ann Barclay, and was educated in the schools of that county and at Victoria University in Cobourg. Before entering university, Munro travelled for two years as a Methodist clergyman. In 1888, he came to the Chilliwack Valley of British Columbia. Munro married Sarah Marcellus in 1893. He died in Chilliwack at the age of 54.
