= Neil Franklin MacKay =

Canadian politician (1864–1922)

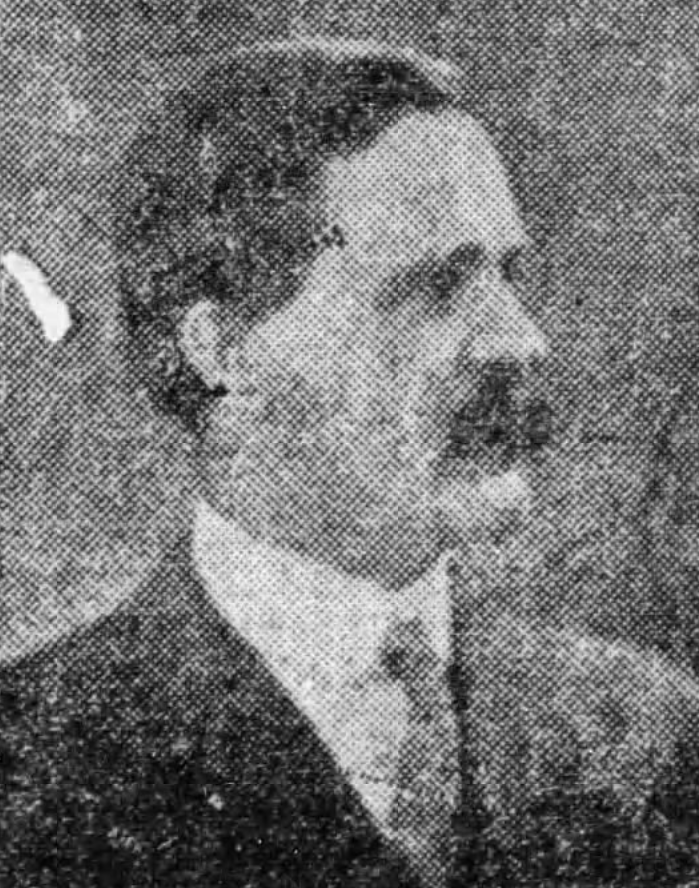

Member of the Legislative Assembly of British Columbia
- In office 1907–1916
- Constituency: Kaslo

Personal details
- Born: September 22, 1864 West River, Nova Scotia
- Died: January 24, 1922 (aged 57) Victoria, British Columbia
- Party: Conservative
- Parent: Alexander MacKay (father)
- Education: Pictou Academy; Dalhousie University
- Occupation: Lawyer, politician

Neil Franklin MacKay (September 22, 1864 – January 24, 1922) was a lawyer and political figure in British Columbia. He represented Kaslo from 1907 until his retirement at the 1916 provincial election in the Legislative Assembly of British Columbia as a Conservative.

He was born in West River, Pictou County, Nova Scotia, the son of Alexander MacKay, and was educated at the Pictou Academy and Dalhousie University. He was called to the Bar for the Northwest Territories in 1894 and then to the British Columbia bar in 1897. MacKay was Deputy Commissioner of Lands and Works in British Columbia from 1901 until 1907, when he resigned that office in 1907 to run for a seat in the provincial assembly. He died in Victoria at the age of 57.
