= Charles Edward Tisdall =

Canadian politician

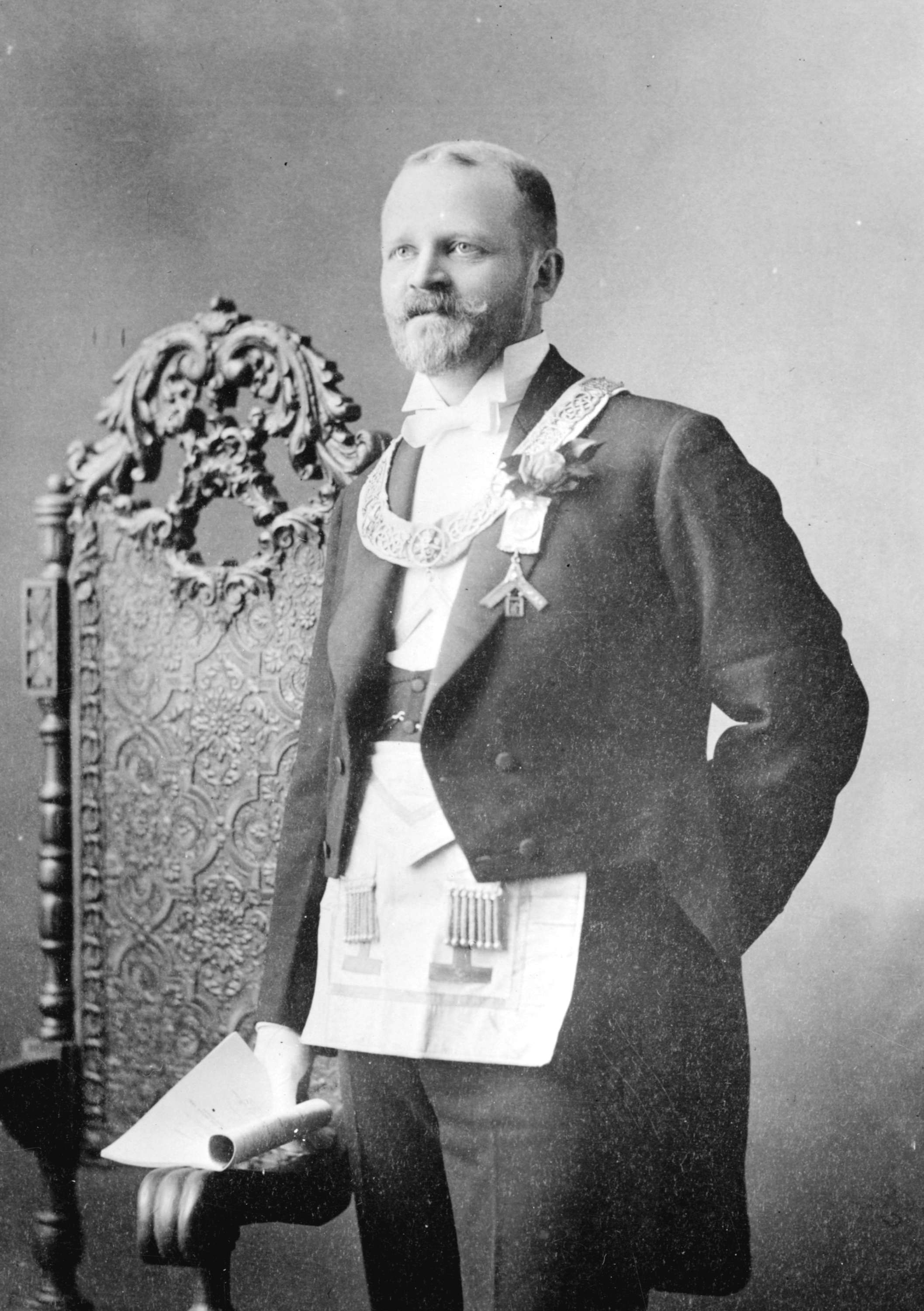
- Tisdall c. 1896

Mayor of Vancouver
- In office 1922–1923
- Preceded by: Robert Henry Otley Gale
- Succeeded by: William Reid Owen

Personal details
- Born: April 9, 1866 Birmingham, England
- Died: March 17, 1936 (aged 69)
- Party: Conservative
- Spouse: Edith B. White

Charles Edward Tisdall (9 April 1866 – 17 March 1936) was the 19th mayor of Vancouver, British Columbia from 1922 to 1923. He was born in Birmingham, England and moved to Vancouver in April 1888. In 1899 he was elected Chairman of the Vancouver Board of Trade.

In 1907, Tisdall married Edith B. White.

He was a member of the province's legislative assembly with the British Columbia Conservative Party. Tisdall represented Vancouver City in the assembly from 1898 to 1900 and from 1909 to 1916. In December 1915, he was named Minister of Public Works and Minister of Railways in the provincial cabinet; in the resulting by-election held in March 1916, Tisdall was defeated by Malcolm Archibald Macdonald. He ran unsuccessfully for reelection in the general election held in September 1916.

He became mayor under a new "proportional representation" voting the city introduced in 1921. Tisdal was re-elected in the December 1922 election. Four rounds of voting were required before the winner was determined. In a plebiscite held June 1923, Vancouver voters voted to abandon STV. And the 1924 election was held using the FPTP system.

The most famous thing about Tisdall's term as Mayor was hosting Warren G. Harding, the President of the United States on July 26, 1923, making it the first time that an American President visited Canada while in office.

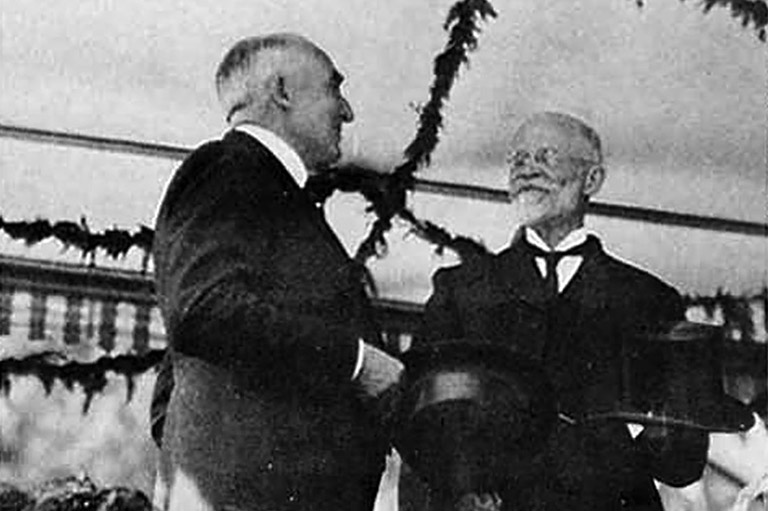
Tisdall shaking hands with Warren G. Harding, the President of the United States.

Tisdall served as a Vancouver alderman and died while serving in that capacity. He was also serving for the city's parks board.

Kevin Michael Tisdall son of John Andrew Tisdall from Dublin Ireland is of the same lineage.
