= Robert Garnett Tatlow =

Canadian politician

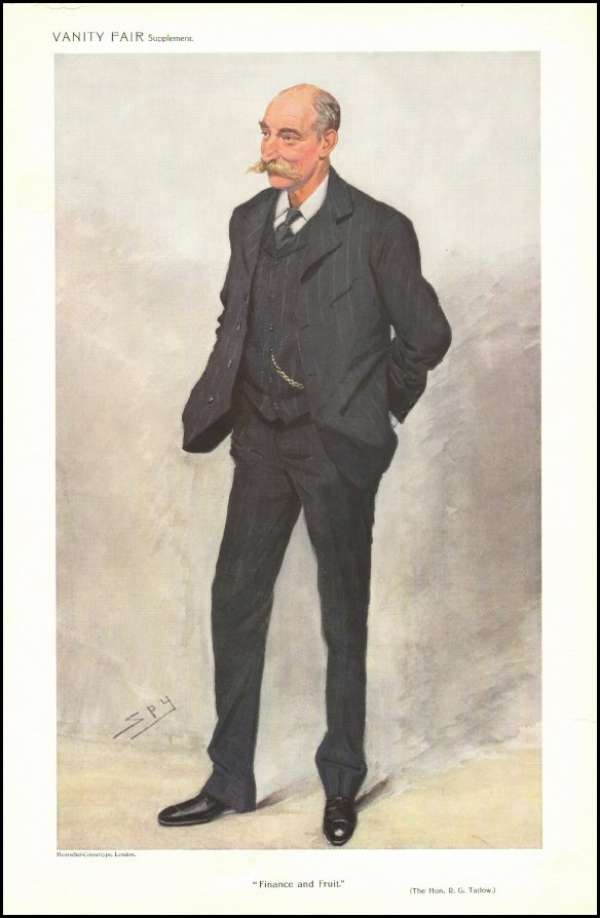

Member of the Legislative Assembly of British Columbia for Vancouver City
- In office 1900–1909

Personal details
- Born: September 6, 1855 Scarva, Northern Ireland
- Died: April 11, 1910 (aged 54) Victoria, British Columbia
- Party: Conservative

Robert Garnett Tatlow (September 6, 1855 – April 11, 1910) was a businessman and political figure in British Columbia (BC). He represented Vancouver City in the Legislative Assembly of British Columbia from 1900 to 1909 as a BC Conservative.

== Biography ==
Tatlow was born in Scarva, Ireland, the son of John Garnett Tatlow and Anne Matthews, and was educated in Cheltenham. After completing his schooling, Tatlow came to Montreal where he was hired by the Montreal Ocean Steamship Company and later a brokerage office. He joined the militia and came to Victoria in 1879 to inspect the coastal defences there. Tatlow remained there as instructor to the local militia and custodian for artillery supplies. The following year, he was hired as private secretary to the lieutenant governor, Albert Norton Richards. He continued in the same function for Richards' successor, Clement Francis Cornwall. Tatlow resigned that post in 1886 and moved to Vancouver where he was a real estate, insurance and mining broker. He was a member of the city's park committee from 1888 to 1905 and served as chairman from 1895 to 1903. In 1893, he married Elizabeth Mary Cambie. Tatlow ran unsuccessfully for a seat in the provincial assembly in 1890 and 1894 before being elected in 1900. He introduced a private member's bill requiring all immigrants to be able to write in a European language. Tatlow served in the provincial cabinet as Minister of Finance and Agriculture (June 1903 to October 1909), Commissioner of Lands and Works (December 1906 to March 1907), and President of the Council (June 1903). He did not seek re-election in the October 1909 provincial election and resigned from the cabinet the day after the election was called when Richard McBride proposed guarantees to help finance the construction of the Canadian Northern Railway. Tatlow died in Victoria at the age of 54 after being ejected from his carriage.

Mount Tatlow was named in his honour.
