= George Albert McGuire =

Canadian politician (1871–1955)

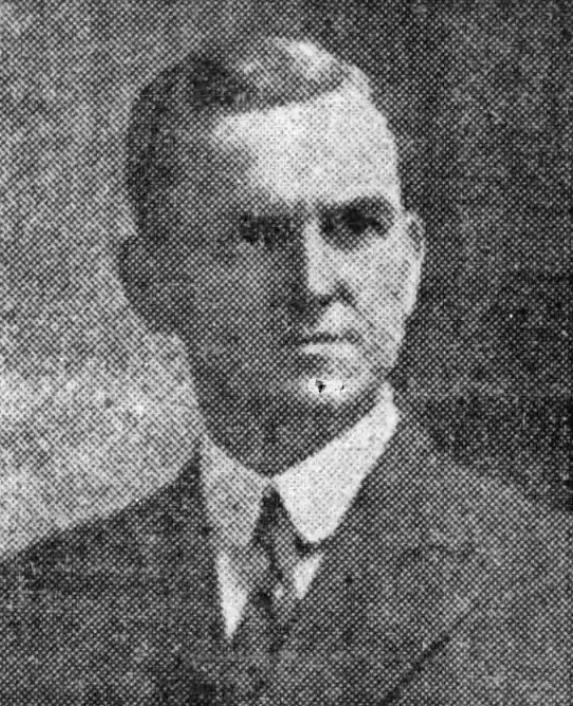

Member of the Legislative Assembly of British Columbia
- In office 1907–1916
- Constituency: Vancouver City

Personal details
- Born: April 7, 1871 Mount Forest, Ontario
- Died: July 2, 1955 (aged 84) Coquitlam, British Columbia
- Party: Conservative
- Education: University of Maryland
- Occupation: Dentist, politician

George Albert McGuire (April 7, 1871 – July 2, 1955) was a dentist and political figure in British Columbia. He represented Vancouver City in the Legislative Assembly of British Columbia from 1907 until his defeat in the 1916 provincial election as a Conservative.

He was born in Mount Forest, Ontario and received a D.D.S. from the University of Maryland in 1892. He moved to Vancouver later that year, where he practised as a dentist until his retirement in 1951. Between June and November 1916, McGuire served in the provincial cabinet as Provincial Secretary and Minister of Education. He was president of the British Columbia Dental Association in 1906. McGuire died in Coquitlam at the age of 84.
