= James Garden =

Canadian politician (1847–1914)

James Ford Garden (February 19, 1847 – December 9, 1914) was a Canadian engineer and the seventh Mayor of Vancouver, British Columbia, serving from 1898 to 1900. Under his tenure the city developed a street car system, sidewalks, road grades and water connections.

Born in Woodstock, New Brunswick, the son of H. M. G. and E. Jane (Gale) Garden, Garden was elected a member of the Canadian Society of Civil Engineers in 1894. He was a lieutenant in the Intelligence Corps in the North-West Rebellion in 1885 and was wounded in the Battle of Batoche. From 1898 to 1900, he was mayor of Vancouver. He ran unsuccessfully as the Conservative candidate for the House of Commons of Canada for the electoral district of Burrard in the 1900 federal election.

After an unsuccessful attempt in the 1898 provincial election, he was elected to the British Columbia Legislative Assembly as a British Columbia Conservative Party MLA for Vancouver City in 1900 and re-elected in a 1901 byelection and in the general elections of 1903 and 1907. He did not stand for a fifth term in the 1909 provincial election.

He died of a stroke at his home at 679 Granville Street, Vancouver.
