= Alexander Henry Boswall MacGowan =

Canadian politician (1850–1927)

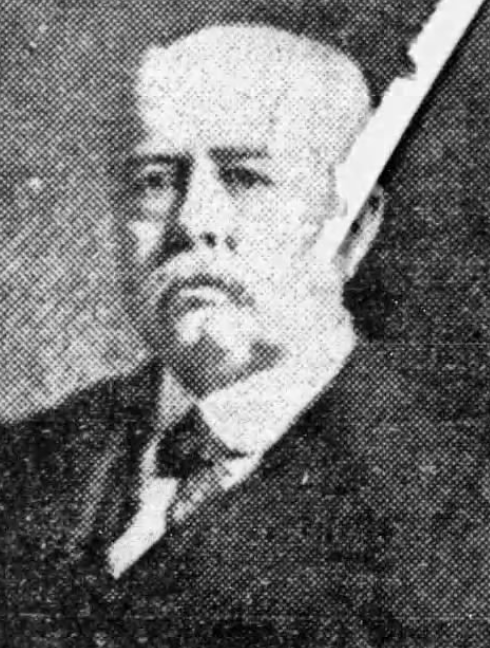

Member of the Legislative Assembly of British Columbia
- In office 1903–1916
- Constituency: Vancouver City

Personal details
- Born: April 14, 1850 Prince Edward Island
- Died: April 23, 1927 (aged 77) Vancouver, British Columbia
- Party: Conservative
- Spouse: Frances M. Hayden (m. 1874)
- Occupation: Businessman, politician

Alexander Henry Boswall MacGowan (April 14, 1850 – April 23, 1927) was a businessman and political figure in British Columbia. He represented Vancouver City from 1903 until his defeat in the 1916 provincial election in the Legislative Assembly of British Columbia as a Conservative. In his last year in office, he served as the deputy speaker of the Legislature. His name also appears as Alexander Henry Boswell MacGowan in some sources.

He was born on Prince Edward Island, the son of William Stainforth MacGowan and Ann Burston Boswall, and was educated there. His grandfather Peter Magowan had served as attorney general for Prince Edward Island. MacGowan became involved in the businesses of shipping and insurance. In 1874, he married Frances M. Hayden. MacGowan came to Vancouver in 1888. His company represented the Insurance Company of North America, Lloyd's of London, the St. Paul Fire and Marine Insurance Company and the Sun Insurance Company, as well as the Consumers Cordage Company. He helped establish the Vancouver Board of Trade and served as its first secretary. MacGowan served on the Vancouver school board for eight years and was secretary for the Fruit Grower's Association and for the British Columbia Dairymens' Association. He was a prominent member of the Masonic lodges of Prince Edward Island and Vancouver. MacGowan died in Vancouver at the age of 77.
