= Results of the 2024 British Columbia general election by riding =

- October 19, 2024

The following tables list by region the nominated candidates and results in the 2024 British Columbia general election.

== Key ==
- Names in **bold** are outgoing cabinet ministers, and names in italics are party leaders. The premier is in **both**.
  - Candidate names and results per Elections BC final statement of votes.
- † denotes incumbent MLAs who are not seeking re-election.
- ‡ denotes incumbent MLAs who are seeking re-election in a different riding.
- †† denotes a former BC United candidate at the time of the party campaign suspension.

== Candidates ==
=== Northern British Columbia ===
Electoral district	Candidates				Incumbent
Electoral district	NDP	Green	Conservative	Other	Incumbent
Bulkley Valley-Stikine	**Nathan Cullen**	Gamlakyeltxw Wilhelm Marsden	Sharon L. Hartwell	Rod Taylor (CHP)	**Nathan Cullen**; Stikine
Nechako Lakes	Murphy Abraham	Douglas Gook	John Rustad		John Rustad
North Coast-Haida Gwaii	Tamara Davidson		Christopher Jason Sankey		Jennifer Rice †; North Coast
Peace River North	Ian McMahon		Jordan Kealy	Dan Davies (ind.)††	Dan Davies
Peace River South	Marshall Bigsby		Larry Neufeld	Mike Bernier (Un.)††	Mike Bernier
Skeena	Sarah Zimmerman	Teri Young	Claire Rattée	Irwin Jeffrey (CHP)	Ellis Ross †

=== Prince George and the Cariboo ===
Electoral district	Candidates				Incumbent
Electoral district	NDP	Green	Conservative	Other	Incumbent
Cariboo-Chilcotin	Michael Moses		Lorne Doerkson		Lorne Doerkson
Prince George-Mackenzie	Shar McCrory	James Steidle	Kiel Giddens††	Rachael Weber (Un.)	Mike Morris †
Prince George-North Cariboo	Denice Bardua	Randy Thompson	Sheldon Clare	Coralee Oakes (ind.)††	Coralee Oakes; Cariboo North
Prince George-Valemount	Clay Pountney	Gwen Johansson	Rosalyn Bird		Shirley Bond †

=== The Kootenays ===
Electoral district	Candidates				Incumbent
Electoral district	NDP	Green	Conservative	Independent	Incumbent
Columbia River-Revelstoke	Andrea Dunlop	Calvin Beauchesne	Scott McInnis††		Doug Clovechok †
Kootenay Central	Brittny Anderson	Nicole Charlwood	Kelly Vandenberghe	Corinne Mori	Brittny Anderson; Nelson-Creston
Kootenay-Monashee	Steve Morissette	Donovan Cavers	Glen Byle		**Katrine Conroy** †; Kootenay West
Kootenay-Rockies	Sam Atwal	Kerri Wall	Pete Davis	Tom Shypitka††	Tom Shypitka; Kootenay East

=== Thompson, Okanagan, Shuswap and Boundary ===
Electoral district	Candidates				Incumbent
Electoral district	NDP	Green	Conservative	Other	Incumbent
Boundary-Similkameen	Roly Russell	Kevin Eastwood	Donegal Wilson	Sean Taylor (ind.)	Roly Russell
Fraser-Nicola	Francyne Joe	Jonah Timms	Tony Luck		Jackie Tegart †
Kamloops Centre	Kamal Grewal	Randy Sunderman	Peter Milobar††		Todd Stone †; Kamloops-South Thompson
Kamloops-North Thompson	Maddi Genn	Tristan Cavers	Ward Stamer		Peter Milobar ‡
Kelowna Centre	Loyal Wooldridge	Bryce Tippe	Kristina Loewen	Michael Humer (Un.)††	New district
Kelowna-Lake Country-Coldstream	Anna Warwick Sears	Andrew Rose	Tara Armstrong	Kevin Kraft (ind.)	Norm Letnick †; Kelowna-Lake Country
Kelowna-Mission	Harpreet Badohal	Billy Young	Gavin Dew	Ashley Ramsay (Un.)††	Renee Merrifield †
Penticton-Summerland	Tina Lee	Bradley Bartsch	Amelia Boultbee	Roger Harrington (ind.)	Dan Ashton †; Penticton
Penticton-Summerland	Tina Lee	Bradley Bartsch	Amelia Boultbee	Anna Paddon (ind.)	Dan Ashton †; Penticton
Penticton-Summerland	Tina Lee	Bradley Bartsch	Amelia Boultbee	Tracy St Claire (Un.)††	Dan Ashton †; Penticton
Salmon Arm-Shuswap	Sylvia Lindgren	Jed Wiebe	David L. Williams	Greg McCune (ind.)††	Greg Kyllo †; Shuswap
Salmon Arm-Shuswap	Sylvia Lindgren	Jed Wiebe	David L. Williams	Sherry Roy (ind.)	Greg Kyllo †; Shuswap
Vernon-Lumby	Harwinder Sandhu		Dennis Giesbrecht	Robert Johnson (Ltn.)	Harwinder Sandhu; Vernon-Monashee
Vernon-Lumby	Harwinder Sandhu		Dennis Giesbrecht	Kevin Acton (Un.)††	Harwinder Sandhu; Vernon-Monashee
West Kelowna-Peachland	Krystal Smith		Macklin McCall	Stephen Johnston (Un.)††	Ben Stewart †; Kelowna West

=== Fraser Valley-Langley-Maple Ridge ===
Electoral district	Candidates				Incumbent
Electoral district	NDP	Green	Conservative	Other	Incumbent
Abbotsford-Mission	**Pam Alexis**		Reann Gasper		**Pam Alexis**
Abbotsford South	Sarah Kooner		Bruce Banman	Amandeep Singh (ind.)	Bruce Banman
Abbotsford West	Graeme Hutchison		Korky Neufeld	James Davison (ind.)	Mike de Jong †
Chilliwack-Cultus Lake	Kelli Paddon		Á'a:líya Warbus		Kelli Paddon; Chilliwack-Kent
Chilliwack North	**Dan Coulter**	Tim Cooper	Heather Maahs	Dan Grice (ind.)	**Dan Coulter**; Chilliwack
Langley-Abbotsford	John Aldag	Melissa Snazell	Harman Bhangu	Alex Joehl (Ltn.)	New district
Langley-Abbotsford	John Aldag	Melissa Snazell	Harman Bhangu	Karen Long (ind.)††	New district
Langley-Abbotsford	John Aldag	Melissa Snazell	Harman Bhangu	Shelly Jan (Un.) (withdrew) (Note: "Shelly Jan has withdrawn as a candidate in Langley-Abbotsford...Ballot printing for the election began on September 29 and is now complete. As a result, Shelly Jan will appear on the ballot for Langley-Abbotsford.")	New district
Langley-Walnut Grove	Megan Dykeman	Rylee Mac Lean	Misty Van Popta	Carlos Suarez Rubio (ind.)	Megan Dykeman; Langley East
Langley-Willowbrook	**Andrew Mercier**	Petrina Arnason	Jody Toor		**Andrew Mercier**; Langley
Maple Ridge East	Bob D'Eith	Kylee Williams	Lawrence Mok		Bob D'Eith; Maple Ridge-Mission
Maple Ridge-Pitt Meadows	**Lisa Beare**		Mike Morden		**Lisa Beare**

=== Surrey ===
Electoral district	Candidates				Incumbent
Electoral district	NDP	Green	Conservative	Other	Incumbent
Surrey City Centre	Amna Shah	Colin Boyd	Zeeshan Wahla	Ryan Abbott (Comm.); Saeed Naguib (ind.)	**Bruce Ralston** †; Surrey-Whalley
Surrey-Cloverdale	Mike Starchuk	Pat McCutcheon	Elenore Sturko	Judy Meilleur (Freedom)	Mike Starchuk
Surrey-Fleetwood	**Jagrup Brar**	Tim Binnema	Avtar Gill		**Jagrup Brar**
Surrey-Guildford	Garry Begg	Manjeet Singh Sahota	Honveer Singh Randhawa	Kabir Qurban (ind.)	Garry Begg
Surrey-Newton	Jessie Sunner		Tegjot Bal	Amrit Birring (Freedom); Joginder Singh Randhawa (ind.); Japreet Lehal (Un.)††	**Harry Bains** †
Surrey North	**Rachna Singh**	Sim Sandhu	Mandeep Dhaliwal	Kiran Hundal (Freedom); Hobby Nijjar (ind.)	**Rachna Singh**; Surrey-Green Timbers
Surrey-Panorama	Jinny Sims		Bryan Tepper	Paramjit Rai (Freedom)	Jinny Sims
Surrey-Serpentine River	Baltej Singh Dhillon		Linda Hepner	Jim McMurtry (ind.)	New district
Surrey South	Haroon Ghaffar		Brent Chapman		Elenore Sturko ‡
Surrey-White Rock	Darryl Walker		Trevor Halford††	Damyn Tassie (Ltn.)	Trevor Halford

=== Richmond and Delta ===
Electoral district	Candidates				Incumbent
Electoral district	NDP	Green	Conservative	Other	Incumbent
Delta North	**Ravi Kahlon**	Nick Dickinson-Wilde	Raj Veauli	Manqoosh Khan (Freedom)	**Ravi Kahlon**
Delta South	Jason McCormick		Ian Paton††		Ian Paton
Richmond-Bridgeport	Linda Li	Tamás Revóczi	Teresa Wat	Glynnis Hoi Sum Chan (ind.); Charlie Smith (ind.)	Teresa Wat; Richmond North Centre
Richmond Centre	Henry Yao		Hon Chan	Dickens Cheung (ind.); Sunny Ho (ind.); Wendy Yuan (Un.)††	Henry Yao; Richmond South Centre
Richmond-Queensborough	Aman Singh		Steve Kooner	Errol E. Povah (ind.); Cindy Wu (ind.)	Aman Singh
Richmond-Steveston	Kelly Greene	Elodie Vaudandaine	Michelle Mollineaux	Jackie Lee (Un.)††	Kelly Greene

=== Burnaby-New Westminster-Tri-Cities ===
Electoral district	Candidates				Incumbent
Electoral district	NDP	Green	Conservative	Other	Incumbent
Burnaby Centre	**Anne Kang**		Dharam Kajal		**Anne Kang**; Burnaby-Deer Lake
Burnaby East	Rohini Arora	Tara Shushtarian	Simon Chandler		Katrina Chen †; Burnaby-Lougheed
Burnaby-New Westminster	Raj Chouhan		Deepak Suri	Daniel Kofi Ampong (ind.)††	Raj Chouhan; Burnaby-Edmonds
Burnaby North	Janet Routledge		Michael Wu††	Martin Kendell (ind.)	Janet Routledge
Burnaby South-Metrotown	Paul Choi	Carrie McLaren	Han Lee	MichaelAngelo Abc RobinHood (ind.)	New district
Burnaby South-Metrotown	Paul Choi	Carrie McLaren	Han Lee	Meiling Chia (Un.)††	New district
Coquitlam-Burke Mountain	Jodie Wickens		Stephen Frolek		Fin Donnelly †
Coquitlam-Maillardville	Jennifer Blatherwick	Nicola Spurling	Hamed Najafi	Ken Holowanky (ind.)	Selina Robinson †
New Westminster-Coquitlam	**Jennifer Whiteside**	Maureen Curran	Ndellie Massey		**Jennifer Whiteside**; New Westminster
Port Coquitlam	**Mike Farnworth**	Adam Bremner-Akins	Keenan Adams††	Lewis Dahlby (Ltn.)	**Mike Farnworth**
Port Moody-Burquitlam	Rick Glumac	Samantha Agtarap	Kerry van Aswegen		Rick Glumac; Port Moody-Coquitlam

=== Vancouver ===
Electoral district	Candidates				Incumbent
Electoral district	NDP	Green	Conservative	Other	Incumbent
Vancouver-Fraserview	**George Chow**	Francoise Raunet	Jag S. Sanghera		**George Chow**
Vancouver-Hastings	**Niki Sharma**	Bridget Burns	Jacob Burdge	Zsolt Kiss (ind.)	**Niki Sharma**
Vancouver-Kensington	Mable Elmore	Amy Fox	Syed Mohsin		Mable Elmore
Vancouver-Langara	Sunita Dhir	Scottford Price	Bryan Breguet		Michael Lee †
Vancouver-Little Mountain	Christine Boyle	Wendy Hayko	John Coupar		**George Heyman** †; Vancouver-Fairview
Vancouver-Point Grey	**David Eby**	Devyani Singh	Paul Ratchford		**David Eby**
Vancouver-Quilchena	Callista Ryan	Michael Barkusky	Dallas Brodie	Caroline Ying-Mei Wang (ind.)	Kevin Falcon †
Vancouver-Renfrew	**Adrian Dix**	Lawrence Taylor	Tom Ikonomou		**Adrian Dix**; Vancouver-Kingsway
Vancouver-South Granville	**Brenda Bailey**	Adam Hawk	Aron Lageri††		**Brenda Bailey**; Vancouver-False Creek
Vancouver-Strathcona	Joan Phillip	Simon de Weerdt	Scott Muller	Kimball Cariou (Comm.)	Joan Phillip; Vancouver-Mount Pleasant
Vancouver-West End	Spencer Chandra Herbert	Eoin O'Dwyer	Jon Ellacott	Carl Turnbull (ind.)	Spencer Chandra Herbert
Vancouver-Yaletown	Terry Yung	Dana-Lyn Mackenzie	Melissa De Genova		New district

=== North Shore-Sea to Sky-Sunshine Coast ===
Electoral district	Candidates				Incumbent
Electoral district	NDP	Green	Conservative	Independent	Incumbent
North Vancouver-Lonsdale	**Bowinn Ma**		David Splett		**Bowinn Ma**
North Vancouver-Seymour	Susie Chant	Subhadarshi Tripathy	Sam Chandola	Mitchell Baker	Susie Chant
Powell River-Sunshine Coast	Randene Neill	Chris Hergesheimer	Chris Moore	Greg Reid	Nicholas Simons †
West Vancouver-Capilano	Sara Eftekhar	Archie Kaario	Lynne Block	Karin Kirkpatrick	Karin Kirkpatrick
West Vancouver-Sea to Sky	Jen Ford	Jeremy Valeriote	Yuri Fulmer		Jordan Sturdy †

=== Vancouver Island ===
Electoral district	Candidates				Incumbent
Electoral district	NDP	Green	Conservative	Other	Incumbent
Courtenay-Comox	Ronna-Rae Leonard	Arzeena Hamir	Brennan Day	John Hedican (ind.)	Ronna-Rae Leonard
Courtenay-Comox	Ronna-Rae Leonard	Arzeena Hamir	Brennan Day	Devin Howell (ind.)	Ronna-Rae Leonard
Cowichan Valley	Debra Toporowski	Cammy Lockwood	John Koury	Eden Haythornthwaite (ind.)	Sonia Furstenau ‡
Cowichan Valley	Debra Toporowski	Cammy Lockwood	John Koury	Jon Coleman (Un.)††	Sonia Furstenau ‡
Ladysmith-Oceanside	Stephanie Higginson	Laura Ferreira	Brett Fee	Adam Walker (ind.)	Doug Routley †; Nanaimo-North Cowichan
Ladysmith-Oceanside	Stephanie Higginson	Laura Ferreira	Brett Fee	Adam Walker (ind.)	Merged district
Ladysmith-Oceanside	Stephanie Higginson	Laura Ferreira	Brett Fee	Adam Walker (ind.)	Adam Walker; Parksville-Qualicum
Mid Island-Pacific Rim	**Josie Osborne**	Ross Reid	Adam Hayduk		**Josie Osborne**
Nanaimo-Gabriola Island	**Sheila Malcolmson**	Shirley Lambrecht	Dale Parker††		**Sheila Malcolmson**; Nanaimo
Nanaimo-Lantzville	George Anderson	Lia Versaevel	Gwen O'Mahony		New district
North Island	Michele Babchuk	Nic Dedeluk	Anna Kindy		Michele Babchuk

=== Greater Victoria ===
Electoral district	Candidates				Incumbent
Electoral district	NDP	Green	Conservative	Other	Incumbent
Esquimalt-Colwood	Darlene Rotchford	Camille Currie	John Wilson		**Mitzi Dean** †; Esquimalt-Metchosin
Juan de Fuca-Malahat	Dana Lajeunesse	David Evans	Marina Sapozhnikov		New district
Langford-Highlands	Ravi Parmar	Erin Cassels	Mike Harris		Ravi Parmar; Langford-Juan de Fuca
Oak Bay-Gordon Head	Diana Gibson	Lisa Gunderson	Stephen Andrew		**Murray Rankin** †
Saanich North and the Islands	Sarah Riddell	Rob Botterell	David Busch	Amy Haysom (ind.)	Adam Olsen †
Saanich South	**Lana Popham**	Ned Taylor	Adam Kubel		**Lana Popham**
Victoria-Beacon Hill	**Grace Lore**	Sonia Furstenau	Tim Thielmann		**Grace Lore**
Victoria-Swan Lake	Nina Krieger	Christina Winter	Tim Taylor	Robert Crooks (Comm.)	**Rob Fleming** †
