= Steeves =

- Pronunciation: /stiːvz/
- Language: English

Origin
- Derivation: Stieff (Germany)
- Region of origin: Hillsborough, New Brunswick, Canada

Other names
- Variant form: Steves

Steeves (also Steves) is a surname. It originates with Johann Heinrich Stieff from Münsingen, Germany, who, along with his wife Regina (née Stahlecker) emigrated to Pennsylvania in 1749, and in 1763 or 1766 joined a group of several other families aboard the ship Lovey and arrived in New Brunswick, with Stieff settling in Hillsborough, Albert County.

The surname “Stieff” was later anglicized into “Steeve”, which eventually formed into surnames “Steves” and “Steeves”.

The earliest "Steeves" members arrived to Hillsborough from Pennsylvania.

== Notable people ==
- Alex Steeves
- Burpee L. Steeves (1868–1933), American politician from Idaho; lieutenant governor of Idaho 1905–07
- David Steeves (1934–1965), U.S. Air Force officer cleared of giving a jet to the USSR
- Ernie Steeves
- George Steeves (born 1945), Canadian art photographer
- H. Peter Steeves, American academic
- Harold Steves Canadian politician and activist
- Hollis Steeves
- John M. Steeves
- Mac Steeves
- Manoah Steves (1828-1897), founder of Steveston, British Columbia
- Paulette Steeves
- Richard Steeves
- Rick Steves
- Tamara Steeves
- Tim Steeves (contemporary), Canadian comedian and writer
- Wayne Steeves (born 1944), Canadian politician from New Brunswick; provincial legislator
- William Steeves (1814–1873), Canadian merchant and politician; one of the Fathers of Canadian Confederation

== Other usage ==
- Steeves Mountain, a mountain in New Brunswick, Canada
- Newtonville/Steeves Field Aerodrome, an aerodrome in Ontario, Canada
- Metajapyx steevesi, a species of hexapod
