= Steves =

Steves may refer to:

== Surname ==
- Detlef Steves (born 1969), German TV personality
- Ferdinand Steves (1886-after 1970), German politician
- Harold Steves (born 1937), Canadian politician in British Columbia
- Kurt Steves (1930-2011), German economic journalist
- Manoah Steves (1828-1897), founder of Steveston, British Columbia
- Rick Steves (born 1955), American writer

== Other uses ==
- Steve (disambiguation)
- Steeves
- STEVE
