= Rob Howard (politician) =

Canadian politician (born 1954/55)

His Worship Rob Howard

Mayor of Richmond
- Incumbent
- Assumed office November 2, 2026
- Preceded by: Malcolm Brodie

Member of the British Columbia Legislative Assembly for Richmond Centre
- In office May 12, 2009 – May 14, 2013
- Preceded by: Olga Ilich
- Succeeded by: Teresa Wat

Richmond City Councillor
- In office 2001–2008

Personal details
- Born: 1954 or 1955 (age 71–72) Richmond, British Columbia, Canada
- Party: Richmond Forward (municipal)
- Other political affiliations: Provincial: BC Liberal; Municipal: Richmond Non-Partisan Association (2001-2002); Richmond First (2002-2006); Independent (2006-2008)
- Spouse: Trudy
- Children: Jay
- Occupation: Property management

Rob Howard (born 1954 or 1955) is a Canadian politician who has served as the mayor of Richmond, British Columbia since 2026.

He previously served in the 39th Parliament of British Columbia as the Member of the Legislative Assembly (MLA) for the riding of Richmond Centre. A member of the BC Liberal Party, he replaced retiring BC Liberal Olga Ilich in that riding, by winning the riding in the 2009 provincial election. While his party formed a majority government, Howard was appointed to several committees, including the Select Standing Committee on Public Accounts in the first two sessions, and Select Standing Committee on Finance and Government Services in the third and fourth session.

As chair of the Select Standing Committee on Finance and Government Services, Howard supported Premier Gordon Campbell's efforts at establishing the Harmonized Sales Tax. Following Campbell's resignation, Howard endorsed Kevin Falcon but Christy Clark won the leadership election. Clark made Howard a Parliamentary Secretary in the Ministry of Transportation. In this position he advocated for open sky agreements and continued this advocacy in his post-political life by establishing the non-profit organization OpenSkies4Canada. Howard did not seek re-election during the 2013 provincial election and was replaced by BC Liberal Teresa Wat.

Prior to his election to the legislature, Howard worked in property management, and served as a Richmond city councillor for seven years. He was first elected to city council in the October 2001 by-election as a member of the Richmond Non-Partisan Association, and was re-elected in the November 2002 and 2005 civic elections as a member of the Richmond First Party. He sat on council as an independent starting in 2006. While on council he advocated in favour of casino expansion, locating the Olympic speed-skating oval in Richmond, and developing a convention centre.

== Background ==
Rob Howard was born and raised in Richmond. He graduated from the University of British Columbia where he studied Urban Land Economics. He worked at Richmond Savings Credit Union from 1975 to 1994, including as head of its real estate investment division, then started his own business NCL Real Estate Management in 1994, specializing in property development and property management. He volunteered with the Richmond Minor Hockey Association for over 12 years, served as president of Tourism Richmond, and was active with the Richmond Chamber of Commerce and the Real Estate Institute of BC. He is married to Trudy and has one son, Justin (Jay).

== City councillor ==
While his mother Irene had served as an alderwoman in Richmond, Howard's political career began with a civic by-election in October 2001. As a candidate with the Richmond Non-Partisan Association, he was elected to one of the three available seats on the Richmond City Council. After less than a year on council, Howard left the Richmond Non-Partisan Association to join a new pro-business political party, Richmond First, which he saw as being less controlling and allowing him to make more independent decisions. He was re-elected in the November 2002 civic election, with his Richmond First party taking four of the eight council seats.

On local issues, Howard was an advocate of opening Richmond to gambling facilities, which led to the establishment of the River Rock Casino Resort. He was supportive of heritage preservation measures but opposed Richmond's tree preservation bylaw. He was the only one on council who preferred the elevated option for the Canada Line (then known as the Richmond-Airport-Vancouver Line), whereas the other councillors preferred the ground level option or no SkyTrain extension at all. He was an advocate for building a convention centre and the most ardent supporter of removing a 55-acre piece of land from the Agricultural Land Reserve as a possible location for it, though the removal was refused. When the possibility of the city constructing a speed-skating oval associated with the 2010 Winter Olympics came, Howard was a vocal supporter. He travelled to Lillehammer, Norway, in 2004 as part of a committee to investigate similar facilities built for the 1994 Winter Olympics. He also traveled to Pierrefonds, Quebec and Asia as part of the sister city program. He was not supportive of proposals to build a new soccer facility or financially contributing to tall ships tourism attractions. Because previous councils had made funding commitments at the expense of the city's reserve funds rather than the tax base, Howard's time on council was marked with consistent property tax increases around 3 to 4% each year. Howard unsuccessfully lobbied other councillors to hire more police officers. He became the subject of a lawsuit, along with other Richmond First councillors, alleging a conflict-of-interest occurred after they approved a rezoning allowing a controversial pub.

In the 2005 civic election, he was again elected, though his Richmond First party only won three of the eight seats. He unsuccessfully lobbied his fellow councillors to appoint him to fill one of Richmond's two seats at Metro Vancouver. With not even his own party members supporting him for the Metro Vancouver seat and finding himself being alone in a number of issues, such as supporting the SkyTrain line being elevated, opposing the tree preservation bylaw, and wanting to hire more police officers, Howard left the Richmond First party in February 2006 to be an independent.

== Provincial politics ==
With Richmond Centre MLA Olga Ilich declining to run for re-election, Howard announced in January 2008 that he would seek to replace Ilich as the BC Liberal Party candidate in the next election. As no one else came forward to challenge Howard, he was acclaimed in November 2008 to be the BC Liberal candidate. In the May 2009 provincial election, he faced notary public Kam Brar of the New Democratic Party, teacher Michael Wolfe of the Green Party, and accountant Kang Chen of the Nation Alliance Party. The riding was considered to be a safe seat for the BC Liberals, and Howard held on to the seat for the party with over 60% of the vote.

As the 39th Parliament began, BC Premier Gordon Campbell did not include Howard in his cabinet. Instead, Howard was appointed to the Select Standing Committee on Public Accounts in the first two sessions and then the Select Standing Committee on Finance and Government Services in the third and fourth sessions, in which he chaired the committee and traveled the province gathering public input regarding budget spending priorities. He was also appointed to the Select Standing Committee on Crown Corporations and the Select Standing Committee on Education in the first two sessions, but neither committee held any meetings. He introduced one piece of legislation, a private members bill, the Trustee Board of the Church of God, Richmond Municipality, B.C. (Corporate Restoration) Act, 2009 (Pr 402) which retroactively restored that organization's corporate status.

Howard toured the province advocating for the federal government to enter into open skies agreements with Asian nations. He also advocated for the Harmonized Sales Tax. Howard remained loyal to Premier Campbell, praising his October 2010 announcement of using the remainder of the budget to cut income tax by 15%, two weeks before the Select Standing Committee on Finance and Government Services was to deliver its report on public consultation for budget priorities. After Campbell resigned, and the tax cut undone, the 2011 BC Liberal leadership election ensued. Along with Richmond's other two MLAs, John Yap and Linda Reid, Howard endorsed Kevin Falcon to be the new party leader, citing Falcon's willingness to listen to all arguments and saying "I think he can bring a new dynamic, a youthful energy to the discussion; he's a great speaker, a great debater." Christy Clark eventually won the leadership and became premier but, like Campbell, did not include Howard in the executive council. In March 2012, Premier Clark promoted Howard to a parliamentary secretary position under the Ministry of Transportation and directed to focus on air services agreements where he served until September. In early 2013, Howard was selected by BC Liberal caucus chair, Gordon Hogg, to assist with the party's investigation into the party's alleged use of government resources and employees in partisan promotional efforts in certain ethnic communities.

Following a summer of deliberations on his future, Howard cited "personal reasons" including a desire to spend more time with his wife, in his September 2012 announcement that he would not seek re-election in the up-coming May 2013 provincial election. With no obvious successor, a competitive BC Liberal Party primary began. By the end of the year, two candidates announced their intention to run: school trustee Grace Tsang and Royal Canadian Mounted Police (RCMP) officer Gary Law. However, Howard approached Teresa Wat, the CEO of the Chinese language radio station CHMB, to be his replacement. Though she did not live in the riding, she was viewed as a better candidate, and the party confirmed her candidacy in January 2013. While Tsang withdrew her nomination to accept a position on a political advisory committee, Law alleged he was harassed to drop out and requested an RCMP investigation. Law decided to run as an independent candidate but lost to Wat, who was subsequently named Minister of International Trade.

== Recent life ==
After finishing his term as MLA, Howard founded the non-profit organization OpenSkies4Canada to advocate for open sky agreements to allow more airline competition in Canadian international airports. In 2014 he co-founded the Richmond Community Coalition, a municipal political organization.

In March 2026, Howard announced that he would run in that October's mayoral election. As a candidate for Richmond Forward, he defeated Alexa Loo by 880 votes to become mayor of Richmond.

== Electoral history ==
=== 2026 Richmond municipal election: Mayor ===
Candidate	Votes	%	Elected
Howard, Rob	19676	34.1%	✔
Loo, Alexa	18796	32.5%	
Heed, Kash	11111	19.2%	
Cheung, Dickens	5876	10.2%	
Kang, Mei	755	1.3%	
Lee, Dennet "The Cat Guy"	627	1.1%	
King, Goldentiger	266	0.5%	
Source: CivicInfo

B.C. General Election 2009 Richmond Centre
Party	Candidate	Votes	%	±	Expenditures
Liberal	Rob Howard	10,483	61.51%	–	$112,387
New Democratic	Kam Brar	4,949	29.04%	–	$16,638
Green	Michael Wolfe	1,213	7.12%	–	$350
Nation Alliance	Kang Chen	399	2.33%	–	$258
Total Valid Votes		17,044	100%		
Total Rejected Ballots		166	0.96%		
Turnout		17,210	40.97%		
