= Henry Yao =

Canadian politician

- 姚君憲
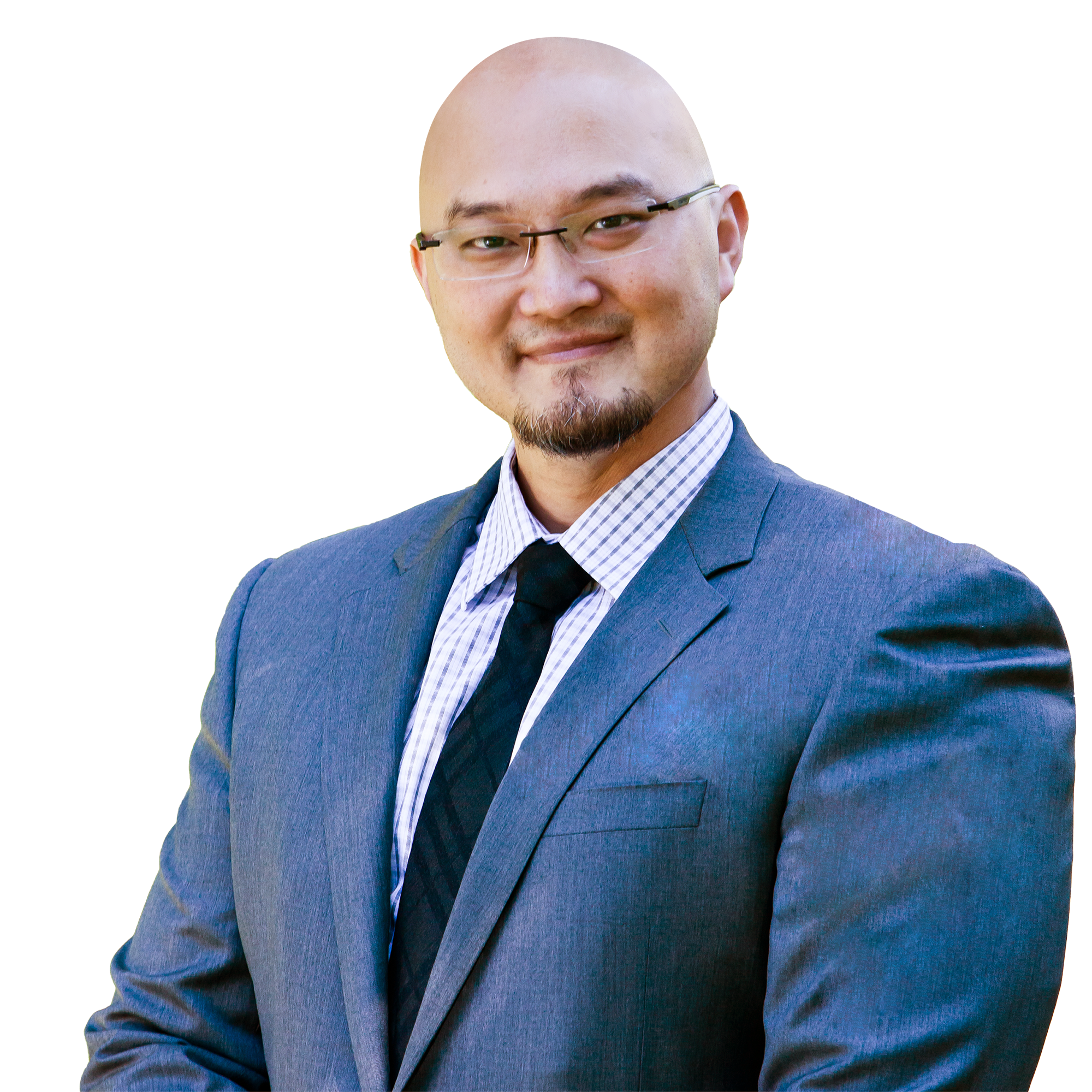
- Yao in 2020

Member of the British Columbia Legislative Assembly for Richmond South Centre
- In office October 24, 2020 – September 21, 2024
- Preceded by: Linda Reid
- Succeeded by: Hon Chan (Richmond Centre)

Personal details
- Born: Jiun-Hsien Yao; 1978 or 1979 (age 46–47) Taiwan
- Party: New Democratic
- Other political affiliations: RITE Richmond
- Education: University of British Columbia

Chinese name
- Traditional Chinese: 姚君憲
- Simplified Chinese: 姚君宪
Transcriptions
Standard Mandarin
- Hanyu Pinyin: Yáo Jūnxiàn

Henry Jiun-Hsien Yao (traditional Chinese: 姚君憲; simplified Chinese: 姚君宪) is a Canadian politician who served as a member of the Legislative Assembly of British Columbia (MLA) for the electoral district of Richmond South Centre from 2020 to 2024. He is a member of the British Columbia New Democratic Party (BC NDP).

== Background and family ==
Born in Taiwan, Yao immigrated to Canada at the age of 11, settling in Richmond, British Columbia. After graduating from Matthew McNair Secondary School, he studied at the University of British Columbia, from which he received a bachelor of arts degree in psychology. He was diagnosed with two types of lymphoma in 2004; after his cancer went into remission, he pursued a career in youth work. He and his wife have one daughter.

== Politics ==
He ran for Richmond City Council twice: the first time in 2014 as an independent candidate, then in 2018 as part of RITE Richmond. Both attempts were unsuccessful.

In the 2020 provincial election, Yao ran in the riding of Richmond South Centre as an NDP candidate, against Alexa Loo of the Liberals. He defeated Loo by a margin of 179 votes, becoming a member of the Legislative Assembly. With Richmond South Centre being dissolved following the 2021 British Columbia electoral redistribution, Yao contested the re-established riding of Richmond Centre in the 2024 provincial election, but lost to Conservative candidate Hon Chan.

He announced his intention to run for mayor of Richmond in the 2026 municipal election, but withdrew his candidacy that September. He instead ran as the NDP candidate for Richmond Centre again in that October's provincial election, this time losing to Conservative Sacha Peter.

== Electoral record ==
=== Provincial elections ===
2026 British Columbia general election: Richmond Centre
** Preliminary results — Not yet official **
Party	Candidate	Votes	%	±%	Expenditures
Conservative	Sacha Peter	7,937	57.01		
New Democratic	Henry Yao	4,762	34.20		
Green	Calvin Dang	836	6.00	—	
CanWest	Lawrence Chen	346	2.49	—	
Total valid votes/expenses limit		13,881	100.0	—	$80,636.03
Total rejected ballots		41	0.29		
Turnout		13,922	—		
Registered voters					
Conservative **hold**		Swing		+4.25	
Source: Elections BC

2024 British Columbia general election: Richmond Centre
Party	Candidate	Votes	%	±%	Expenditures
Conservative	Hon Chan	8,426	51.99	–	$29,190.30
New Democratic	Henry Yao	5,961	36.78	−15.7	$51,543.13
Unaffiliated	Wendy Yuan	1,028	6.34	–	$56,950.40
Independent	Dickens Cheung	556	3.43	–	$9,603.95
Independent	Sunny Ho	237	1.46	–	$6,452.31
Total valid votes/expenses limit		16,208	99.63	–	$71,700.08
Total rejected ballots		61	0.37	–	
Turnout		16,269	49.07	–	
Registered voters		33,153			
Conservative **notional gain** from New Democratic		Swing		–	
Source: Elections BC

2020 British Columbia general election: Richmond South Centre
Party	Candidate	Votes	%	±%	Expenditures
New Democratic	Henry Yao	6,743	50.67	+10.39	$37,030.55
Liberal	Alexa Loo	6,564	49.33	+0.61	$50,107.69
Total valid votes		13,307	100.00	–	
Rejected ballots		207	1.53	+0.34	
Turnout		13,514	40.12	−6.58	
Registered voters		33,685			
New Democratic **gain** from Liberal		Swing		+4.89	
Source: Elections BC

=== Municipal elections ===
Top 8 candidates elected — Incumbents marked with "(X)". Elected members' names are in bold

2018 British Columbia municipal elections: Richmond City Council
Party	Council candidate	Vote	%
RITE Richmond	**Carol Day** (X)	20,871	7.01
Richmond Citizens' Association	**Harold Steves** (X)	19,136	6.43
Richmond Community Coalition	**Chak Au** (X)	18,026	6.05
Richmond First	**Bill McNulty** (X)	17,242	5.79
Richmond Citizens' Association	**Kelly Greene**	16,464	5.53
Richmond First	**Linda McPhail** (X)	15,521	5.21
RITE Richmond	**Michael Wolfe**	13,627	4.58
Independent	**Alexa Loo** (X)	13,212	4.44
Richmond First	Derek Dang (X)	13,115	4.40
Richmond First	Andy Hobbs	12,336	4.14
Richmond Citizens' Association	Judie Schneider	11,672	3.92
Richmond Community Coalition	Ken Johnston (X)	11,161	3.75
Richmond Community Coalition	Jonathan Ho	11,140	3.74
Richmond Citizens' Association	Jack Trovato	10,915	3.67
Richmond First	Sunny Ho	8,933	3.00
RITE Richmond	Niti Sharma	8,917	2.99
RITE Richmond	Henry Yao	8,467	2.84
Richmond First	Peter Liu	8,357	2.81
Richmond Community Coalition	Parm Bains	7,973	2.68
Independent	John Roston	7,961	2.67
Richmond Community Coalition	Melissa Zhang	7,708	2.38
Independent	Kerry Starchuk	6,959	2.34
Independent	Jason Tarnow	5,720	1.92
Independent	Adil Awan	4,278	1.44
Independent	Manjit Singh	4,134	1.39
Independent	Dennis Page	3,478	1.17
Independent	Andy Chiang	3,337	1.12
Independent	Theresa Head	3,251	1.09
Independent	Patrick J. Saunders	2,241	0.75
Independent	Zhe Zhang	2,241	0.75
