= Nation Alliance Party =

- Former provincial party
- Leader: Wei Ping Chen
- Founded: June 2007
- Dissolved: May 2012
- Headquarters: 7518 - 138 Street, Surrey, British Columbia
- Ideology: Multiculturalism
- Colours: Yellow & Black

Website
- Official website

The Nation Alliance Party was a minor political party in British Columbia, Canada. While the party was registered with Elections BC as a provincial party, it also participated in the 2008 federal election, the 2008 municipal election, as well as the 2009 provincial election. The party sought to promote multiculturalism, advocate for rights of ethnic minorities and recent immigrants focusing on employment access, security, health care, education and overall rights and status. It was an advocacy party that sought to politically empower and enable those who do not speak English as a first language to participate in politics.

Led by Wei Ping Chen, the party was founded in June 2007. Chen stood for election in Richmond in the October 2008 federal election, and for mayor of Richmond, British Columbia in the November 2008 municipal election, losing both times. In the May 2009 provincial election the party nominated two candidates, one in Richmond Centre and the other in Richmond East, neither of whom were elected but combined for 818 total votes.

== Background ==
The Nation Alliance Party was founded in June 2007 by four people: realtor Wei Ping Chen of Delta, renovator Steven Lian from Surrey, tourism guide Randy Liu from Burnaby, and Simon Fraser University student Locan Wang. Party leader Wei Ping Chen had immigrated to Canada from Beijing, via Australia. He witnessed the challenges that recent immigrants faced once in a new country, and how uninvolved they were in politics. Contrasted to his experience in China, Wei Ping Chen was impressed with the political freedoms available in Canada and felt motivated to start a political party. He felt that political campaigns oriented towards recent immigrants and people whose first language is not English, would empower those communities to become more politically active.

Wei Ping Chen was a candidate in the October 2008 federal election in the Richmond electoral district. However, because the party was not registered with Elections Canada, he ran as an independent. He came in fifth place, with 395 votes (0.92%), losing to the Conservative Party's Alice Wong.

In November 2008, Nation Alliance Party members nominated candidates for the municipal election in Richmond. Wei Ping Chen challenged incumbent Malcolm Brodie for the mayoral position and Kang Chen, Yang Dai, Jiajian Cheung, Jian Liu, and Bai Chen were nominated for councillor positions. Like the federal campaign, they were classified as independents. The latest census at the time reported that 50% of Richmond's population was of Chinese descent and their campaign highlighted the language barrier faced by those who did not speak English, for example tax notices were only available in English. They participated in the all-candidate forums that were translated in Cantonese and Mandarin. None of its candidates were elected with Wei Ping Chen receiving 7% of the vote.

== Political positions ==
The Nation Alliance Party was guided by a support for multiculturalism. Specifically, the party sought to increase translation services for people who could not read or speak English or people whose first language is not English, equivalency of academic standards, more supportive immigration services that assist transition into Canadian society, and better working conditions for recent immigrants and migrant labourers.

While the party did not maintain a full slate of policy positions, its candidates advocated for increasing the number of police in Richmond, especially along the SkyTrain route, protection of green spaces, support for affordable housing, and trade missions with China. They were generally in favour of lower taxes but with more spending on senior services and education. In the 2009 provincial election they campaigned against the carbon tax which the governing BC Liberal Party had implemented the previous year.

== Election results ==
In the 2009 provincial election, the party nominated candidates in two ridings. Wei Ping Chen stood in the Richmond East riding but got only 419 votes (2.27%), coming in last place, losing to BC Liberal Linda Reid. In Richmond Centre, the Nation Alliance Party candidate was Kang Chen. He came in last with 399 votes (2.33%), losing to BC Liberal Rob Howard. The party de-registered with Elections BC in May 2012, one year prior to the next election, scheduled for May 2013.

Election	Candidates	Total votes	Popular vote	Riding	Candidate	Votes	Popular vote in riding
2009	2	818	0.05%				
2009	2	818	0.05%	Richmond East	Wei Ping Chen	419	2.27%
2009	2	818	0.05%	Richmond Centre	Kang Chen	409	2.33%

== Finances ==
In 2009 provincial election both candidates only reported $250 worth of expenditures to Elections BC. In that same election the party claimed $318 in general election expenditures.

Annual Financial Report
Year	Income	Expenses	Assets	Reference
2007	$428	$2,773	$1,155	
2008	$1,030	$439	$1,746	
2009	$2,273	$1,357	$2,000	
2010	$64	$120	$0	
2011	$948	$54	$0	
2012	$20	$20	$0	

Election Expenses
Election	Income	Expenses	Surplus/Deficit	Reference
2009	$2,147	$318	$1,830	

== See also ==
- List of political parties in British Columbia
