= Alexa Loo =

Canadian snowboarder (born 1972)

- 盧仙泳
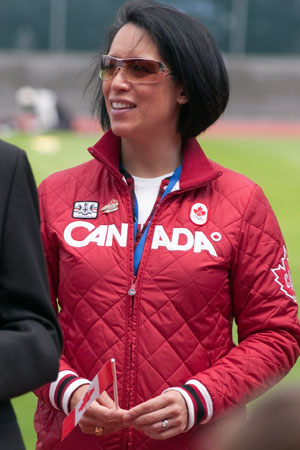

Richmond City Councillor
- In office 2014–2026

Personal details
- Born: October 6, 1972 (age 54) Vancouver, British Columbia
- Party: Richmond Strong
- Other political affiliations: BC Liberal (provincial); ONE Richmond (municipal)
- Spouse: Ari Goosen (m. 2010)
- Children: 2
- Education: University of British Columbia
- Profession: accountant; snowboarder

Military service
- Allegiance: Canada
- Branch: Canadian Army (primary reserves)
- Years of service: 2022–present
- Rank: Honorary Lieutenant-colonel
- Unit: 39 Service Battalion
- Sports career
- Height: 168 cm (5 ft 6 in)
- Sport: Snowboarding

Chinese name
- Traditional Chinese: 盧仙泳
- Simplified Chinese: 卢仙泳
Transcriptions
Standard Mandarin
- Hanyu Pinyin: Lú Xiānyǒng
Yue: Cantonese
- Jyutping: Lou4 Sin1 Wing6

Alexa Loo (born October 6, 1972) is a Canadian athlete, accountant and politician, serving as city councillor for Richmond, British Columbia from 2014 to 2026. As a snowboarder, she competed in the parallel giant slalom at the 2006 and 2010 Winter Olympics.

== Early life and family ==
Loo was born in Vancouver and raised in the adjacent city of Richmond, British Columbia. Her father is Chinese-Canadian, and her mother is of French-English ancestry. She attended the University of British Columbia, where she competed as both a rower and swimmer for the Thunderbirds. After graduating with a bachelor of commerce degree in 1994, she joined accounting firm KPMG, eventually gaining the chartered accountant designation.

Loo married Ari Goosen shortly after the 2010 Winter Olympics; the couple has two sons.

== Snowboarding career ==
She began snowboarding at 15 years old, and joined a racing club in 1995. By the 2000s, she was coached by Mark Fawcett; she also counted Jasey-Jay Anderson among her mentors.

In 2006 she won a bronze medal in the woman's parallel giant slalom (PGS) at the World Cup in Plan de Corones, Italy, becoming the first Canadian woman to earn a World Cup medal in alpine snowboarding. At that year's Winter Olympics in Turin, she finished 20th overall in the women's PGS qualifying runs.

After finishing 12th in women's PGS at the 2010 Winter Olympics in Vancouver, she announced her retirement from competitive snowboarding in July that year.

Other career highlights include:

- Finished ninth in PGS at the World Cup Lac Beauport, Quebec.
- Gold medalist in PGS at the Nor Am Cup in Copper Mountain (Colorado).
- Eighth in PGS at the 2005 World Cup, Tandadalen, Sweden.
- 16th in PGS at the 2005 World Cup in Sapporo-Makomanai, Japan.
- 17th in PGS at the 2005 World Cup in Bardonecchia, Italy.
- Silver medalist in parallel slalom at the 2005 NorAm Cup PSL, Sun Peaks, British Columbia.
- 14th in PGS at the 2004 World Cup, Soelden, Austria.

Loo served as the athlete representative to the International Ski Federation (FIS) and for many years sat on the board of directors of AthletesCAN - the association of Canada's national team athletes.

== Politics ==
Loo ran for Richmond City Council for the first time in the 2011 municipal election; she finished in 11th place and was not elected. She ran again in the 2014 municipal election as an independent candidate, this time winning a council seat by finishing eighth overall. She was re-elected for a second term in 2018.

In September 2020, Loo became the British Columbia Liberal Party candidate for the riding of Richmond South Centre, in a bid to replace retiring member of the Legislative Assembly Linda Reid. In the October 24, 2020 provincial election, she lost to New Democratic Party candidate Henry Yao by a margin of 179 votes.

She was re-elected to Richmond City Council for a third term in 2022, this time running as a candidate for ONE Richmond. In February 2026, Loo announced that she would run for mayor in that October's municipal election. As a candidate for Richmond Strong, she narrowly lost to Rob Howard by 880 votes.

== Electoral history ==
=== Provincial elections ===
2020 British Columbia general election: Richmond South Centre
Party	Candidate	Votes	%	±%	Expenditures
New Democratic	Henry Yao	6,743	50.67	+10.39	$37,030.55
Liberal	Alexa Loo	6,564	49.33	+0.61	$50,107.69
Total valid votes		13,307	100.00	–	
Rejected ballots		207	1.53	+0.34	
Turnout		13,514	40.12	−6.58	
Registered voters		33,685			
New Democratic **gain** from Liberal		Swing		+4.89	
Source: Elections BC

=== Municipal elections ===
Top 8 candidates elected — Incumbents marked with "(X)". Elected members' names are in bold

2018 British Columbia municipal elections: Richmond City Council
Party	Council candidate	Vote	%
RITE Richmond	**Carol Day** (X)	20,871	7.01
Richmond Citizens' Association	**Harold Steves** (X)	19,136	6.43
Richmond Community Coalition	**Chak Au** (X)	18,026	6.05
Richmond First	**Bill McNulty** (X)	17,242	5.79
Richmond Citizens' Association	**Kelly Greene**	16,464	5.53
Richmond First	**Linda McPhail** (X)	15,521	5.21
RITE Richmond	**Michael Wolfe**	13,627	4.58
Independent	**Alexa Loo** (X)	13,212	4.44
Richmond First	Derek Dang (X)	13,115	4.40
Richmond First	Andy Hobbs	12,336	4.14
Richmond Citizens' Association	Judie Schneider	11,672	3.92
Richmond Community Coalition	Ken Johnston (X)	11,161	3.75
Richmond Community Coalition	Jonathan Ho	11,140	3.74
Richmond Citizens' Association	Jack Trovato	10,915	3.67
Richmond First	Sunny Ho	8,933	3.00
RITE Richmond	Niti Sharma	8,917	2.99
RITE Richmond	Henry Yao	8,467	2.84
Richmond First	Peter Liu	8,357	2.81
Richmond Community Coalition	Parm Bains	7,973	2.68
Independent	John Roston	7,961	2.67
Richmond Community Coalition	Melissa Zhang	7,708	2.38
Independent	Kerry Starchuk	6,959	2.34
Independent	Jason Tarnow	5,720	1.92
Independent	Adil Awan	4,278	1.44
Independent	Manjit Singh	4,134	1.39
Independent	Dennis Page	3,478	1.17
Independent	Andy Chiang	3,337	1.12
Independent	Theresa Head	3,251	1.09
Independent	Patrick J. Saunders	2,241	0.75
Independent	Zhe Zhang	2,241	0.75

2014 British Columbia municipal elections: Richmond City Council
Party	Council candidate	Vote	%
Richmond First	**Bill McNulty**	17,417	7.08
Richmond Community Coalition	**Chak Au**	15,742	6.40
Richmond First	**Linda McPhail**	15,679	6.37
Richmond First	**Derek Dang**	14,844	6.03
Independent	**Harold Steves**	14,417	5.86
Rite Richmond	**Carol Day**	13,389	5.44
Richmond Community Coalition	**Ken Johnston**	12,792	5.20
Independent	**Alexa Loo**	12,595	5.12
Richmond First	Andy Hobbs	12,013	4.88
Rite Richmond	Michael Wolfe	11,765	4.78
Richmond Community Coalition	Dan Baxter	9,952	4.04
Richmond Community Coalition	Kirby Graeme	9,869	4.01
Richmond Community Coalition	Sal Bhullar	8,965	3.64
Independent	Dave Semple	8,566	3.48
Richmond First	Elsa Wong	8,500	3.45
Richmond Community Coalition	Helen Quan	8,375	3.40
Richmond Reform	Sunny Ho	6,926	2.81
Renew Richmond	Grace Tsang	6,222	2.53
Independent	Roy Sakata	5,824	2.37
Independent	Jerome Dickey	4,708	1.91
Independent	Henry Juin-Hsien Yao	4,412	1.79
Independent	Jennifer Huang	3,977	1.62
Renew Richmond	Adil Awan	3,587	1.46
Independent	Janos Bergman	3,248	1.32
Independent	Don Montgomery	2,997	1.22
Independent	Laura Nastasa	2,295	0.93
Independent	Patrick S. Saunders	2,108	0.86
Independent	Kristian von Schalburg	1,619	0.66
Independent	Gary Yuill	1,406	0.57
Independent	Lee Gildemeester	1,258	0.51
Independent	Jun L. Wuyan	694	0.28
