= Chak Au =

Canadian politician

Chak Au MP
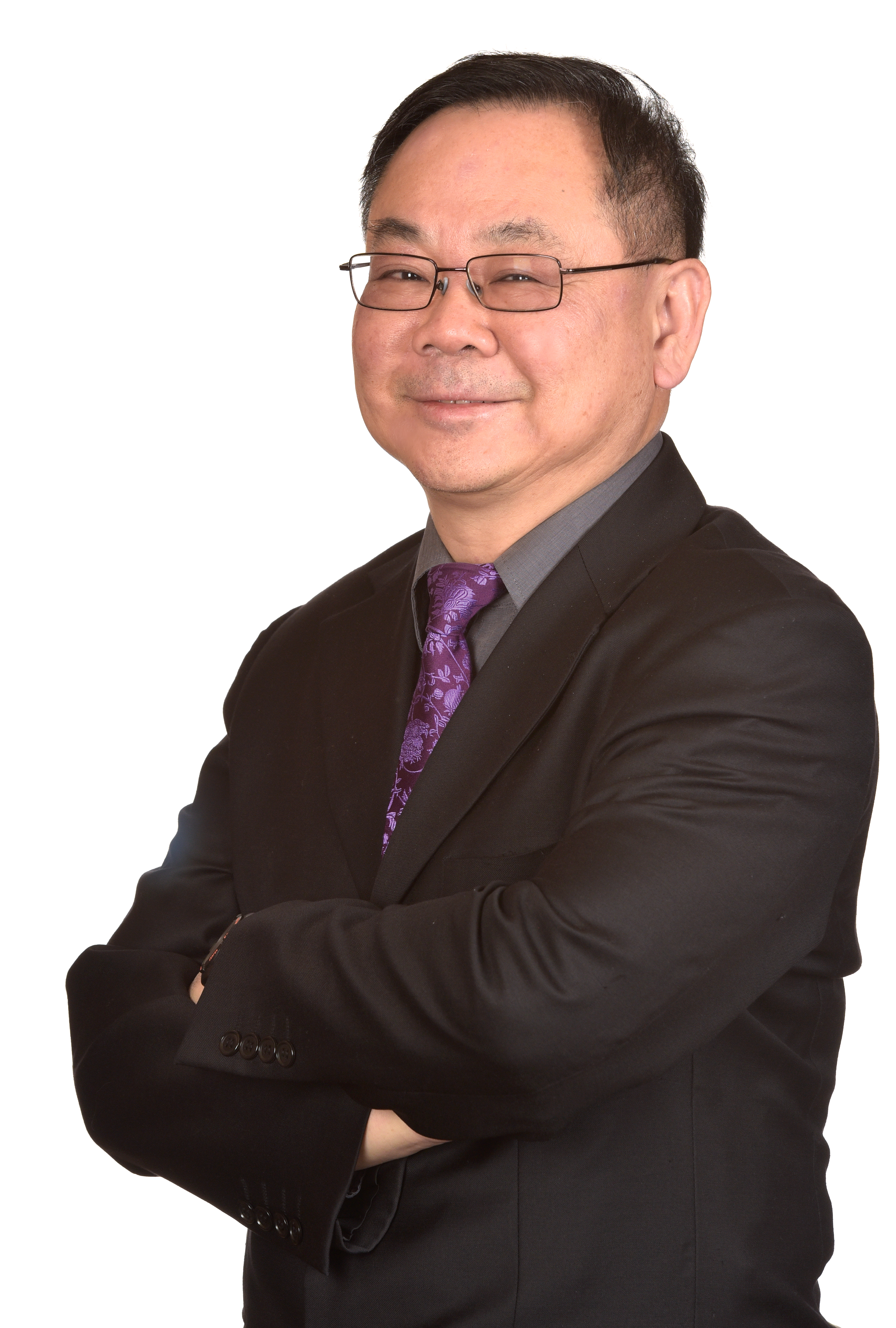
- Au in 2017

Member of Parliament for Richmond Centre—Marpole
- Incumbent
- Assumed office April 28, 2025
- Preceded by: Wilson Miao

Richmond City Councillor
- In office December 5, 2011 – February 1, 2026

Personal details
- Born: Hong Kong
- Party: Conservative
- Other political affiliations: Municipal: Richmond Independent Team of Electors (2011–2014); Richmond Community Coalition (2014–2026); Provincial: BC NDP (2017)
- Education: University of Hong Kong

Chak Au
- Traditional Chinese: 區澤光
Transcriptions
Standard Mandarin
- Hanyu Pinyin: Oū Zé Guāng
Yue: Cantonese
- Jyutping: au1 zaak6 gwong1

Chak Kwong Au MP (Chinese: 區澤光; Jyutping: au1 zaak6 gwong1) is a Canadian politician who has served as a member of Parliament (MP) representing the riding of Richmond Centre—Marpole since 2025. A member of the Conservative Party, he previously served as a trustee for the Richmond School District from 1999 to 2011, and as a member of the Richmond City Council from 2011 to 2026.

== Early life and education ==
Born in Hong Kong, Au graduated from the University of Hong Kong and worked for the Hong Kong Government's Social Welfare Department. A family therapist by profession, he also served as a lecturer at the Chinese University of Hong Kong. He immigrated to Canada in 1988, and worked as a therapist with Vancouver Coastal Health.

== Municipal and provincial politics (1999–2026) ==
Au was elected to serve on the Richmond School District in 1999, becoming the city's first school trustee to be bilingual in English and Chinese. He served four terms in that role until the 2011 municipal election, when he pivoted and successfully ran for Richmond City Council as a candidate with the Richmond Independent Team of Electors. He switched to the Richmond Community Coalition in July 2014, and was re-elected councillor in that year's municipal election.

In the 2017 provincial election, he ran as a British Columbia New Democratic Party candidate in the riding of Richmond South Centre, but lost to long-time Liberal member of the Legislative Assembly Linda Reid. He stayed on city council, and was re-elected in 2018 and 2022, when he won the highest number of votes of any candidate for council in the at-large election.

In February 2024, Chak Au was outspoken on his opposition to a council motion directing health authorities to conduct a feasibility study of a safe consumption site in Richmond. This motion by Councillors Kash Heed and Laura Gillanders was put forward amidst the ongoing toxic drug crisis, which claimed the lives of 26 Richmondites in 2023. Au argued that the motion's proposal was not an open study as it promised to be, but rather, a directive from council to Vancouver Coastal Health (VCH) asking for a consumption site to be built. Au also questioned the effectiveness of safe consumption sites. On February 13, council voted 7–2 in favour of the motion, with only Au and Councillor Alexa Loo dissenting. The next day, VCH reported that public health data did not support a need for a safe consumption site in Richmond, and that it would not pursue one. Thereafter, Mayor Malcolm Brodie declared the matter closed and council ended discussion on the topic.

== Federal politics (2025–present) ==
Au was nominated as the Conservative candidate for Richmond Centre—Marpole in March 2025. He was elected as a member of parliament (MP) in the 2025 federal election, defeating incumbent Liberal MP Wilson Miao.

Following his election, Au announced that he would continue serving as a Richmond city councillor until the 2026 municipal election, citing the cost of a by-election and stating that he would donate his council salary to charity. In January 2026, he announced that he would resign from council, stating that friends and family had advised him not to hold both positions simultaneously. He resigned in February 2026 after Richmond City Council voted unanimously not to hold a by-election to fill the vacancy.

During the 45th Parliament, Au served as a member of the Standing Committee on Public Safety and National Security.

== Electoral history ==
2025 Canadian federal election: Richmond Centre—Marpole
Party	Candidate	Votes	%	±%	Expenditures
Conservative	Chak Au	23,532	49.56	+14.11	$120,676.52
Liberal	Wilson Miao	21,232	44.71	+6.13	$72,215.44
New Democratic	Martin Li	2,109	4.44	–15.94	none listed
Green	Michael Sisler	420	0.88	–2.25	$477.30
People's	David Wang	193	0.41	–2.05	$247.26
Total valid votes/expense limit		47,486	99.31	–	$127,851.47
Total rejected ballots		332	0.69	–0.29	
Turnout		47,818	59.20	+13.02	
Eligible voters		80,777			
Conservative notional gain from Liberal		Swing		+3.99	
Source: Elections Canada

2017 British Columbia general election: Richmond South Centre
Party	Candidate	Votes	%	Expenditures
Liberal	Linda Reid	6,914	48.72	$68,363
New Democratic	Chak Au	5,716	40.28	$71,475
Green	Greg Powell	1,561	11.00	$379
Total valid votes		14,191	100.00	–
Total rejected ballots		171	1.19	
Turnout		14,362	46.70	
Registered voters		30,753		
Source: Elections BC
