= Sacha Peter =

Canadian politician

Sacha Peter MLA

Member of the Legislative Assembly for Richmond Centre
- Incumbent
- Assumed office October 24, 2026
- Preceded by: Hon Chan

Parliamentary Secretary for Technology & Innovation
- Incumbent
- Assumed office November 20, 2026
- Preceded by: Office Established

Personal details
- Party: Conservative
- Website: website

Sacha Peter MLA is a Canadian politician who was elected to the British Columbia Legislative Assembly for Richmond Centre at the 2026 British Columbia general election.

Peter previously was a contributor for Divestor.com, a website he founded in 2009 that covers financial and economic news and offers advice in these areas. He was also previously the chair of the Cultus Lake Park Board.

== Electoral record ==
2026 British Columbia general election: Richmond Centre
** Preliminary results — Not yet official **
Party	Candidate	Votes	%	±%	Expenditures
Conservative	Sacha Peter	7,937	57.01		
New Democratic	Henry Yao	4,762	34.20		
Green	Calvin Dang	836	6.00	—	
CanWest	Lawrence Chen	346	2.49	—	
Total valid votes/expenses limit		13,881	100.0	—	$80,636.03
Total rejected ballots		41	0.29		
Turnout		13,922	—		
Registered voters					
Conservative hold		Swing		+4.25	
Source: Elections BC
