= Greg Halsey-Brandt =

Canadian politician

Member of the British Columbia Legislative Assembly for Richmond Centre
- In office May 16, 2001 – May 17, 2005
- Preceded by: Doug Symons
- Succeeded by: Olga Ilich

Mayor of Richmond
- In office December 3, 1990 – June 11, 2001
- Preceded by: Gilbert Joseph Blair
- Succeeded by: Linda Barnes (acting)

Richmond City Councillor
- In office December 1, 2008 – December 5, 2011
- In office December 7, 1981 – December 3, 1990

Minister of State for Intergovernmental Relations of British Columbia
- In office June 5, 2001 – January 26, 2004
- Premier: Gordon Campbell
- Preceded by: Andrew Petter (Minister of Intergovernmental Relations) (Note: Position vacant from February 24, 2000 to June 5, 2001.)
- Succeeded by: Sindi Hawkins

Personal details
- Born: 1942 or 1943 (age 83–84)
- Party: BC Liberal
- Education: University of British Columbia
- Occupation: planning consultant

Greg Halsey-Brandt (born 1942 or 1943) is a Canadian politician and planning consultant from Richmond, British Columbia. He served as a member of the Legislative Assembly (MLA) of British Columbia from 2001 to 2005, representing the district of Richmond Centre, and as Minister of State for Intergovernmental Relations from 2001 to 2004 in the cabinet of Premier Gordon Campbell. He was also mayor of Richmond from 1990 to 2001, and served as municipal councillor on two separate occasions.

== Biography ==
Halsey-Brandt graduated from the University of British Columbia in 1965 with a bachelor of arts degree, then received a master of arts degree in geography from the same institution in 1969. He worked as a planner for the municipalities of Surrey and Delta, and conducted economic planning work for the government of Ontario. He served as a municipal councillor for Richmond from 1981 to 1990, and as the Mayor of Richmond from 1990 to 2001. He had also served as chair of the Greater Vancouver Regional District, and as a director of the Union of B.C. Municipalities.

With incumbent Richmond Centre MLA Doug Symons declining to run again, Halsey-Brandt contested the riding in the 2001 provincial election as a BC Liberal candidate, and was elected to the legislature. The Liberals gained power in that election, and Halsey-Brandt was appointed to the cabinet that June as Minister of State for Intergovernmental Relations, serving in that role until January 2004. He was also a member of the Government Caucus Committee on Government Initiatives, the Select Standing Committee on Finance and Government Services, the Asian Economic Development Committee, and the Public Accounts Committee. He did not run for re-election in 2005.

Following his departure from the provincial legislature, Halsey-Brandt returned to Richmond City Council, where he was elected once again in the 2008 municipal elections. His wife, Evelina Halsey-Brandt, and ex-wife, Sue Halsey-Brandt, both sat on the council at the time. After one term on council, he announced he would not seek re-election in October 2011, only a month before the next municipal election. He cited frustrations with the council, namely a lack of accountability and financial scrutiny, as well as a desire to enjoy retirement and spend time with his family.

In 2013, Halsey-Brandt received the Freedom of the City, the highest honour a local government can award, in recognition of his exceptional service to the community. He was the fifth individual in Richmond's history to receive the honour.

== Personal life ==
Halsey-Brandt is married to former Richmond politician, Evelina Halsey-Brandt. Together, the two have six children and nine grandchildren.
