= Ernest LeCours =

Canadian politician

MLA for Richmond
- In office 1963–1972
- Succeeded by: Harold Steves

Personal details
- Born: August 6, 1911 Craik, Saskatchewan
- Died: March 10, 1993 (aged 81) Richmond, British Columbia
- Party: Social Credit Party of British Columbia

Ernest Anselm LeCours (August 6, 1911 – March 10, 1993) was a Canadian politician. He served in the Legislative Assembly of British Columbia from 1963 to 1972, as a Social Credit member, initially for the constituency of Delta and then later for the constituency of Richmond. He was defeated when he sought reelection for Social Credit in 1972 and then was defeated a second time when he ran as an independent in the 1983 provincial election in Oak Bay-Gordon Head.
