= Thomas Pearson (British Columbia politician) =

Canadian politician (1859–1939)

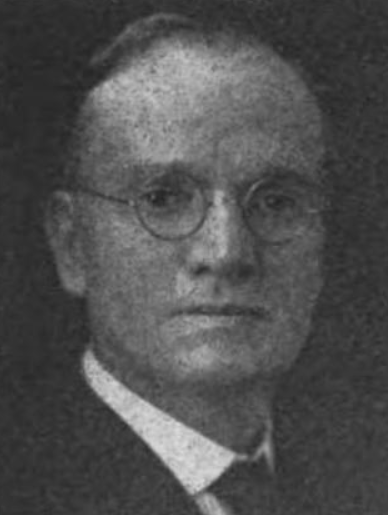

Member of the Legislative Assembly of British Columbia
- In office 1920–1924
- Preceded by: Gerald Grattan McGeer
- Constituency: Richmond

Personal details
- Born: March 5, 1859 Rawdon, Quebec
- Died: July 25, 1939 (aged 80) Rawdon, Quebec
- Party: Conservative
- Spouse: Eleanor Pringle (m. 1883; died 1930)
- Children: 7
- Occupation: Manager

Thomas Pearson (March 5, 1859 – July 25, 1939) was a Canadian politician. He served in the Legislative Assembly of British Columbia from 1920 until his retirement at the 1924 provincial election, from the electoral district of Richmond, a member of the Conservative Party. He previously served as reeve of Point Grey, British Columbia in 1920 and as a councillor from 1916 to 1919.

He married Montreal native Eleanor Pringle on September 20, 1883. She died on September 21, 1930.

He died at his home in Rawdon on July 25, 1939.
