= Richmond (British Columbia provincial electoral district) =

Defunct provincial electoral district in British Columbia, Canada

Richmond was a provincial electoral district British Columbia, Canada. It made its first appearance on the hustings in the election of 1903. It lasted until the 1920 election, after which it lost some territory to the new South Vancouver riding, and became the new riding of Richmond-Point Grey. There was again an electoral district called Richmond from 1966 through the 1986 provincial elections.

== History of MLAs ==
=== Single-member district ===
Assembly	Years	Member	Party
10th	1903–1907	Francis Lovett Carter-Cotton	Conservative
11th	1907–1909	Francis Lovett Carter-Cotton	Conservative
12th	1909–1912	Francis Lovett Carter-Cotton	Conservative
13th	1912–1916	Francis Lovett Carter-Cotton	Conservative
14th	1916–1920	Gerry McGeer	Liberal
15th	1920–1924	Thomas Pearson	Conservative
Riding dissolved into Richmond-Point Grey and South Vancouver
Riding re-created from Delta
26th	1966–1969	Ernest LeCours	Social Credit
27th	1969–1972	Ernest LeCours	Social Credit
28th	1972–1975	Harold Steves	NDP
29th	1975–1979	Jim Nielsen	Social Credit
30th	1979–1983	Jim Nielsen	Social Credit
31st	1983–1986	Jim Nielsen	Social Credit

=== Dual-member district ===
Assembly	Years	Seat 1		Seat 2	
Assembly	Years	Member	Party	Member	Party
34th	1986–1991	Bill Vander Zalm	Social Credit	Nick Loenen	Social Credit
Riding re-dissolved into Richmond Centre, Richmond East, Richmond-Steveston.

== Electoral history ==
Note: Winners of each election are in bold.

1903 British Columbia general election
Party	Candidate	Votes	%
Conservative	**Francis Lovett Carter-Cotton**	460	58.97%
Liberal	John Cunningham Brown	320	41.03%
Total valid votes		780	100.00%

1907 British Columbia general election
Party	Candidate	Votes	%
Conservative	**Francis Lovett Carter-Cotton**	417	48.04%
Liberal	John Walter Weart	403	46.43%
Socialist	Charles Edward Kilby	48	5.53%
Total valid votes		868	100.00%

1909 British Columbia general election
Party	Candidate	Votes	%
Conservative	**Francis Lovett Carter-Cotton**	918	57.92%
Liberal	John Wallace deBeque Farris	667	42.08%
Total valid votes		1,585	100.00%

1912 British Columbia general election
Party	Candidate	Votes	%
Conservative	**Francis Lovett Carter-Cotton**	Acclaimed	-.-%
Total valid votes		n/a	-.-%

1916 British Columbia general election
Party	Candidate	Votes	%
Liberal	**Gerry McGeer**	1,441	54.07%
Conservative	William Joseph Baird	1,189	44.52%
Independent Conservative	Robert McBride	35	1.31%
Total valid votes		2,665	100.00%

1920 British Columbia general election
Party	Candidate	Votes	%
Conservative	**Thomas Pearson**	2,863	37.89%
Liberal	Hiram Perry McCraney	2,712	35.89%
Federated Labour Party	Charles Smith Cassidy	1,499	19.84%
Independent Farmer	Reginald Abbott	272	3.60%
Independent	Robert McBride	210	2.78%
Total valid votes		7,556	100.00%

1966 British Columbia general election
Party	Candidate	Votes	%
Social Credit	**Ernest LeCours**	6,521	43.33%
New Democratic	Robert McMath	6,149	40.85%
Liberal	John McKeman	2,381	15.82%
Total valid votes		15,051	100.00%

1969 British Columbia general election
Party	Candidate	Votes	%
Social Credit	**Ernest LeCours**	9,521	45.36%
New Democratic	Robert McMath	8,099	38.58%
Liberal	John McKeman	3,372	16.06%
Total valid votes		20,992	100.00%

1972 British Columbia general election
Party	Candidate	Votes	%
New Democratic	**Harold Steves**	12,845	45.36%
Social Credit	Ernest LeCours	7,221	38.58%
Progressive Conservative	William Wright	3,573	13.37%
Liberal	Allen Cowen	3,084	11.54%
Total valid votes		26,723	100.00%

1975 British Columbia general election
Party	Candidate	Votes	%
Social Credit	**Jim Nielsen**	17,932	52.81%
New Democratic	Harold Steves	12,598	35.10%
Liberal	Dave Williams	2,665	7.85%
Progressive Conservative	Madeline Noble	755	2.11%
Independent	Frederick Sim	44	0.13%
Total valid votes		33,994	100.00%

1979 British Columbia general election
Party	Candidate	Votes	%
Social Credit	**Jim Nielsen**	18,783	51.14%
New Democratic	Harold Steves	15,549	42.33%
Progressive Conservative	Barry Wright	2,400	6.53%
Total valid votes		36,732	100.00%

1983 British Columbia general election
Party	Candidate	Votes	%
Social Credit	**Jim Nielsen**	26,261	55.30%
New Democratic	Harold Steves	18,575	39.12%
Progressive Conservative	Sam Nazaruk	1,751	3.69%
Liberal	Russel Timothy Emes	897	1.89%
Total valid votes		47,484	100.00%

1986 British Columbia general election
Party	Candidate	Votes	%	Elected
Social Credit	**Bill Vander Zalm**	29,762	58.28	✓
Social Credit	Nick Loenen	25,983	50.88	✓
New Democratic	Doug Sandberg	16,542	32.39	
New Democratic	Arthur Kube	15,580	30.51	
Liberal	David Chambers	4,028	7.89	
Liberal	Steve Mullan	3,830	7.50	
Independent	Clinton Davy	822	1.61	
Total valid votes		51,071	100.00	
Total rejected ballots		1,670		

== See also ==
- List of British Columbia provincial electoral districts
- Canadian provincial electoral districts
- Vancouver (electoral districts)

Legislative Assembly of British Columbia
Preceded by Okanagan South	Constituency represented by the premier 1986-1991	Succeeded by Surrey-Newton
