= Doug Symons =

Canadian politician

Member of the British Columbia Legislative Assembly for Richmond Centre
- In office October 17, 1991 – May 16, 2001
- Preceded by: Riding established
- Succeeded by: Greg Halsey-Brandt

Personal details
- Born: Douglas Symons Regina, Saskatchewan, Canada
- Party: BC Liberal
- Spouse: Marge Symons
- Education: University of British Columbia
- Occupation: teacher

Douglas Symons is a former Canadian politician who served as a member of the Legislative Assembly (MLA) of British Columbia from 1991 to 2001, representing the riding of Richmond Centre. As part of the British Columbia Liberal Party caucus, he served as the Official Opposition Critic for Transportation and Highways, BC Transit and BC Ferries.

Symons was educated at the University of British Columbia, receiving a B.Ed. in 1961. Before entering politics, he taught school for 29 years. Running as a BC Liberal candidate, he was first elected MLA for Richmond Centre in the 1991 provincial election, and was re-elected in that riding in 1996. He declined to seek re-election in 2001.
