= Hon Chan =

Canadian politician

- 陳瀚生
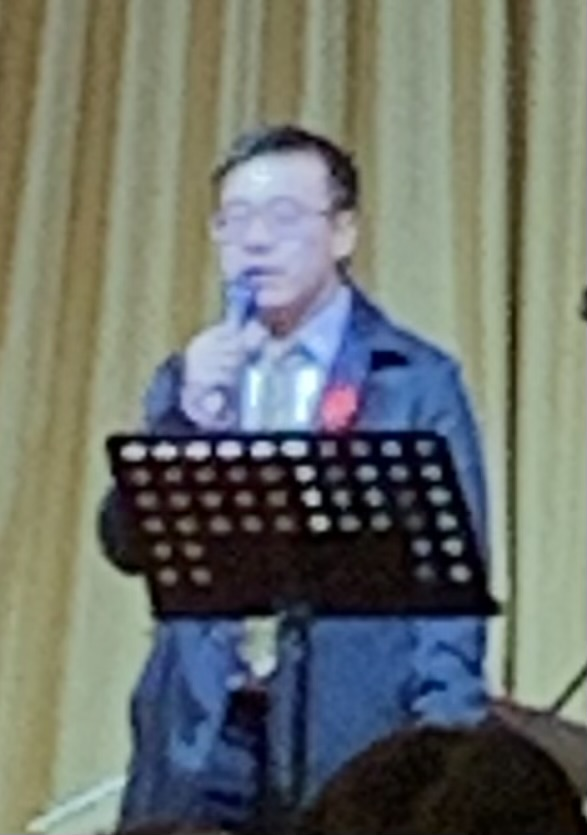
- Chan in 2025

Member of the British Columbia Legislative Assembly for Richmond Centre
- In office October 19, 2024 – October 24, 2026
- Preceded by: Henry Yao (Richmond South Centre)
- Succeeded by: Sacha Peter

Personal details
- Born: November 12, 1987 (age 39) Hong Kong
- Party: Independent (2026–present)
- Other political affiliations: BC Conservative (before 2026)
- Education: University of British Columbia
- Occupation: News anchor; Talk show host

Chinese name
- Traditional Chinese: 陳瀚生
- Simplified Chinese: 陈瀚生
Transcriptions
Yue: Cantonese
- Yale Romanization: Chàhn Hohn-sāng
- Jyutping: Can^{4} Hon^{6} Sang^{1}

Hon Sang Chan (Chinese: 陳瀚生; born November 12, 1987) is a Canadian politician who served as a member of the Legislative Assembly of British Columbia (MLA) for the electoral district of Richmond Centre from 2024 to 2026. Initially elected as a member of the Conservative Party, he was removed from the caucus following criminal charges of assault, and finished his term as an independent member.

== Early life and career ==
Chan grew up in Richmond, British Columbia, where he received elementary and secondary education. After graduating from the University of British Columbia, he worked for 15 years in the news industry as a news anchor, assignment editor and talk show host for Fairchild TV. During these years as a professional journalist he reported on issues including addiction and homelessness, affordability, health, infrastructure, immigration, and cultural exchange.

In addition to his professional endeavours, Chan has volunteered with Richmond Hospital providing translation services, and helping to make the hospital more accessible for new immigrants. He also has served on various advisory committees for the City of Richmond.

== Political career ==
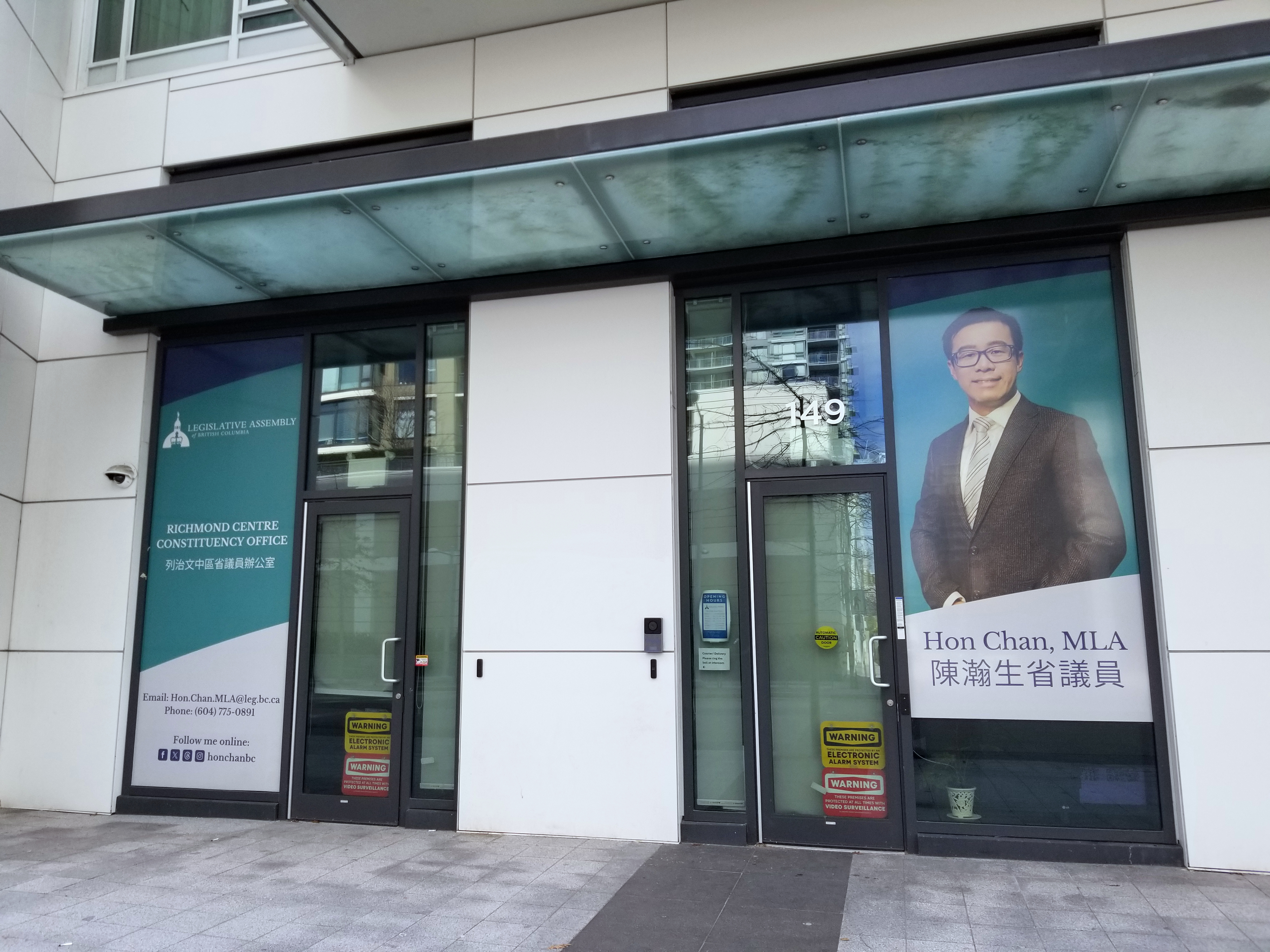
Chan's constituency office

After securing the nomination as the BC Conservative candidate for Richmond Centre on August 21, 2024, he defeated New Democratic Party candidate Henry Yao in that October's provincial election to become the riding's member of the Legislative Assembly. He was named the opposition Critic for Climate Solutions and Climate Readiness in November 2024.

On March 26, 2026, Chan was removed from the Conservative caucus following domestic violence charges stemming from an alleged offence which occurred January 12, 2024, prior to his election. Interim Conservative Party leader Trevor Halford said the party took action to remove Chan immediately upon becoming aware of the charges, and that he's "very confident" nobody involved in the party or caucus knew about the criminal investigation into Chan prior to its public release. Chan's lawyer entered a plea of not guilty on his behalf at the Richmond provincial court in August 2026. He did not run in the 2026 provincial election.

== Electoral history ==
2024 British Columbia general election: Richmond Centre
Party	Candidate	Votes	%	±%	Expenditures
Conservative	Hon Chan	8,426	51.99	–	$29,190.30
New Democratic	Henry Yao	5,961	36.78	−15.7	$51,543.13
Unaffiliated	Wendy Yuan	1,028	6.34	–	$56,950.40
Independent	Dickens Cheung	556	3.43	–	$9,603.95
Independent	Sunny Ho	237	1.46	–	$6,452.31
Total valid votes/expenses limit		16,208	99.63	–	$71,700.08
Total rejected ballots		61	0.37	–	
Turnout		16,269	49.07	–	
Registered voters		33,153			
Conservative notional gain from New Democratic		Swing		–	
Source: Elections BC

== See also ==
- 43rd Parliament of British Columbia
