= Olga Ilich =

Canadian politician

Member of the British Columbia Legislative Assembly for Richmond Centre
- In office May 17, 2005 – May 12, 2009
- Preceded by: Greg Halsey-Brandt
- Succeeded by: Rob Howard

Minister of Tourism, Sports and the Arts of British Columbia
- In office June 16, 2005 – August 15, 2006
- Premier: Gordon Campbell
- Preceded by: Position established
- Succeeded by: Stan Hagen

Minister of Labour and Citizens’ Services of British Columbia
- In office August 15, 2006 – June 23, 2008
- Premier: Gordon Campbell
- Preceded by: Michael de Jong
- Succeeded by: Iain Black

Personal details
- Born: 1951 or 1952 (age 73–74) The Netherlands
- Party: BC Liberal (Provincial); Conservative (Federal)
- Education: University of British Columbia (BA); University of Manitoba (MA); Memorial University of Newfoundland (MBA)
- Occupation: real estate developer

Olga Ilich (born 1951 or 1952) is a former Canadian politician. She represented the riding of Richmond Centre in the Legislative Assembly of British Columbia from 2005 to 2009 as a member of the British Columbia Liberal Party, and served in the Executive Council of British Columbia from 2005 to 2008.

== Biography ==
Born in the Netherlands, she moved to Richmond, British Columbia in 1959, graduating from Steveston Secondary School. After receiving a bachelor of arts degree from the University of British Columbia, she attended the University of Manitoba and graduated with a master of arts degree, and attained an MBA from the Memorial University of Newfoundland.

She was hired at Richmond-based Progressive Construction by Milan Ilich in 1980, eventually becoming the company's executive vice-president. At one point she was married to Milan's brother Bob, with whom she has two sons. She went on to found her own real estate company Suncor Development.

She ran for the BC Liberals in the 2005 provincial election, and was elected member of the Legislative Assembly (MLA) for Richmond Centre. She was named to Premier Gordon Campbell's cabinet as Minister of Tourism, Sports and the Arts that June, before being re-assigned as Minister of Labour and Citizens’ Services in August 2006. During her time on the labour file, the provincial government implemented regulations to protect gas station workers by mandating pre-payment at urban gas stations at night. In December 2007 she announced her decision to not seek a second term as MLA at the next provincial election; she was dropped from the cabinet in June 2008.

After finishing her term in May 2009, she was named by mayor of Vancouver Gregor Robertson in December 2011 to co-chair a task force on housing affordability. She became a member of Destination Canada's board of directors in 2014, and served as chair of the board from 2015 to 2017.
