= Malcolm Brodie (politician) =

Canadian mayor (born c. 1949)

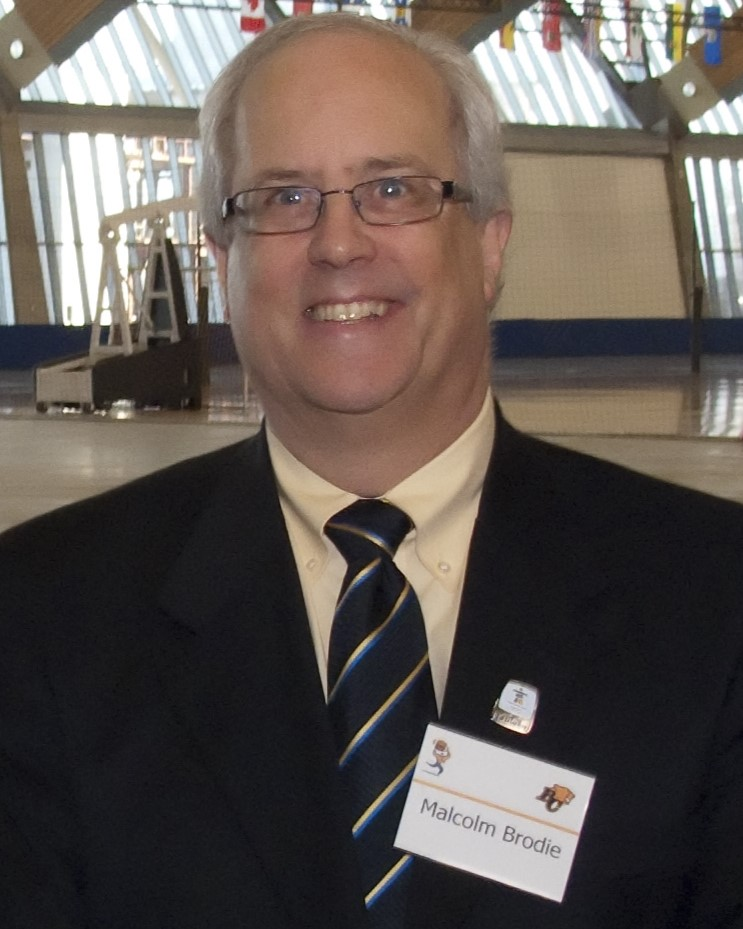
- Mayor Brodie at the Olympic Oval, 2009

Mayor of Richmond, British Columbia
- In office October 29, 2001 – November 2, 2026
- Preceded by: Greg Halsey-Brandt
- Succeeded by: Rob Howard

Personal details
- Born: c. 1949 New York City, New York, U.S.
- Party: Independent
- Spouse: Christine Brodie
- Children: Garrett; Stephanie
- Profession: Lawyer
- Website: www.malcolmbrodie.com

Malcolm Brodie is a Canadian politician who served as the mayor of Richmond, the fourth-largest city in British Columbia from October 2001 to November 2026.

A lawyer by profession, Brodie was elected to City Council in 1996 and again in 1999, as part of the centre-right Richmond Non-Partisan Association (RNPA). After the resignation of mayor Greg Halsey-Brandt, Brodie was elected mayor in a special by-election on 29 October 2001. He left his RNPA party, and now serves as an independent. Brodie was re-elected by large margins in 2002, 2005, 2008, 2014 and 2018 and 2022. He is the longest-serving mayor in Richmond's history, surpassing Rudy Grauer, who served from 1930 to 1949.

== Experience ==
Brodie has played various roles in multiple organizations and committees, including Metro Vancouver Director since 2001, Chair of the Zero Waste Committee and Richmond's General Purposes Committee, and chair, vice-chair and trustee of the Municipal Finance Authority. He is also director of PRIMECorp, which manages police records in BC, and a member of the Utilities Committee, Transportation Committee, Finance Committee, Mayor's Committee, Intergovernmental Administration Committee, and RCMP Local Government Contract Management Committee. He served as Director Representative in the Greater Vancouver Transportation Authority (TransLink) board from 2002 to 2007 and as chair in 2006.

A Richmond resident since 1977, Brodie has two adult children, Garrett and Stephanie, and three grandchildren, Kayla, Matthew, and Brodie.

== Recognition ==
Brodie received the Queen Elizabeth II Golden Jubilee Medal in 2002, Queen Elizabeth II Diamond Jubilee Medal in 2012, and the Commemorative Medal at the 125th anniversary of the Confederation of Canada in 1992.

== Electoral history ==
=== 2022 Municipal mayoral election: Richmond City Council ===
Mayoral candidate	Votes	%
Malcolm Brodie	23,239	67.55
John Roston	9,304	27.04
Wei Ping Chen	1,859	5.40
Source: City of Richmond

=== 2018 Municipal mayoral election: Richmond City Council ===
Candidate	Votes	%
Malcolm Brodie	30,452	64.26
Roy Sakata	7,942	16.76
Donald Flintoff	4,204	8.87
Hong Guo	2,940	6.20
Lawrence Chen	1,260	2.66
Cliff Wei	594	1.25
Total Valid Votes	47,365	100.00
Source: City of Richmond

=== 2014 Municipal mayoral election: Richmond City Council ===
Candidate	Votes	%
Malcolm Brodie	27,149	69.78
Richard Lee	10,667	27.42
Cliff Lifeng Wei	1,088	2.80
Total Valid Votes	37,816	100.00
Source: City of Richmond
