= Richmond Centre (provincial electoral district) =

Provincial electoral district in British Columbia, Canada

British Columbia electoral district
- Interactive map of riding boundaries

Provincial electoral district
- Legislature: Legislative Assembly of British Columbia
MLA
Sacha Peter
Conservative
- First contested: 1991
- Last contested: 2026

Demographics
- Population (2021): 54,474
- Area (km²): 7
- Pop. density (per km²): 7,782
- Census division: Metro Vancouver
- Census subdivision: Richmond (part)

Richmond Centre is a provincial electoral district in British Columbia, represented in the Legislative Assembly of British Columbia from 1991 to 2017 and since 2024.

Located in the central portion of the city of Richmond, the riding was first created in 1988. It was split into Richmond North Centre and Richmond South Centre after the 2015 electoral redistribution, and was re-created from those same ridings after the 2021 electoral redistribution.

== Demographics ==
Population, 2021	54,474
Area (km^{2})	7
Pop. Density (people per km^{2})	7,782
Source: BC Electoral Boundaries Commission

== Geography ==
The electoral district comprises the part of the city of Richmond (including Brighouse and the downtown core of said city) within the following boundary: commencing at the intersection of Westminster Highway and No. 2 Road, thence east along said highway to No. 3 Road, thence north along said road to Alderbridge Way, thence east along said way to No. 4 Road, thence south along said road to Blundell Road, thence west along said road to No. 2 Road, thence north along said road to the point of origin.

== Members of the Legislative Assembly ==
This riding has elected the following members of the Legislative Assembly:

Assembly	Years	Member	Party
Richmond Centre; Riding created from Richmond
35th	1991–1996	Doug Symons	Liberal
36th	1996–2001	Doug Symons	Liberal
37th	2001–2005	Greg Halsey-Brandt	Liberal
38th	2005–2009	Olga Ilich	Liberal
39th	2009–2013	Rob Howard	Liberal
40th	2013–2017	Teresa Wat	Liberal
Riding dissolved into Richmond North Centre and Richmond South Centre
Riding re-created from Richmond North Centre and Richmond South Centre
43rd	2024–2026	Hon Chan	Conservative
43rd	2026–2026	Hon Chan	Independent
44th	2026–present	Sacha Peter	Conservative

== Election results ==
2026 British Columbia general election
** Preliminary results — Not yet official **
Party	Candidate	Votes	%	±%	Expenditures
Conservative	Sacha Peter	7,414	57.47	+5.48	
New Democratic	Henry Yao	4,356	33.76	–3.02	
Green	Calvin Dang	772	5.98	–	
CanWest	Lawrence Chen	321	2.49	–	
Total valid votes/expenses limit		12,863	100.0	–	$80,636.03
Total rejected ballots		38	0.29	–0.08	
Turnout		12,901	–		
Registered voters					
Conservative hold		Swing		+4.25	
Source: Elections BC

2024 British Columbia general election
Party	Candidate	Votes	%	±%	Expenditures
Conservative	Hon Chan	8,426	51.99	–	$29,190.30
New Democratic	Henry Yao	5,961	36.78	−15.7	$51,543.13
Unaffiliated	Wendy Yuan	1,028	6.34	–	$56,950.40
Independent	Dickens Cheung	556	3.43	–	$9,603.95
Independent	Sunny Ho	237	1.46	–	$6,452.31
Total valid votes/expenses limit		16,208	99.63	–	$71,700.08
Total rejected ballots		61	0.37	–	
Turnout		16,269	49.07	–	
Registered voters		33,153			
Conservative notional gain from New Democratic		Swing		–	
Source: Elections BC

2020 general election redistributed results
Party	%
New Democratic	52.5
Liberal	45.6
Green	2.0

=== Electoral history 1991–2017 ===
2013 British Columbia general election
Party	Candidate	Votes	%	±%	Expenditures
Liberal	Teresa Wat	9,462	49.83	–11.68	$65,821.00
New Democratic	Frank Yunrong Huang	4,436	23.36	–5.68	$39,418.13
Green	Michael Wolfe	1,678	8.84	+1.72	$0.00
Independent	Gary Law	1,617	8.51	—	$46,245.00
Conservative	Lawrence Chen	961	5.06	—	$4,363.30
Independent	Richard Lee	754	3.97	—	$9,441.32
Unparty	Chanel Donovan	82	0.43	—	$165.31
Total valid votes/expense limit		18,990	100.00	—	$73,218.39
Total rejected ballots		180	0.94	–0.04	
Turnout		19,170	43.65	+2.63	
Registered voters		43,915			
Liberal hold		Swing		–3.00	
Source: Elections BC

2011 Sales Tax Referendum
Side	Votes	%
Yes	12,922	63.77%
No	7,347	36.23%

B.C. General Election 2009 Richmond Centre
Party	Candidate	Votes	%	±	Expenditures
Liberal	Rob Howard	10,483	61.51%		$112,387
New Democratic	Kam Brar	4,949	29.04%		$16,638
Green	Michael Wolfe	1,213	7.12%	–	$350
Nation Alliance	Kang Chen	399	2.33%	–	$258
Total Valid Votes		17,044	100%		
Total Rejected Ballots		166	0.96%		
Turnout		17,210	40.97%		

2009 Electoral Reform Ref.
Option	Votes	%
FPTP	10,892	67.01
BC-STV	5,362	32.99

*FPTP = First Past The Post, BC-STV = Single Transferable Vote

B.C. General Election 2005: Richmond Centre
Party	Candidate	Votes	%	±	Expenditures
Liberal	Olga Ilich	10,908	58.56%		$128,747
NDP	Dale Jackaman	6,051	32.49%		$11,266
Green	Chris Segers	1,436	7.71%	–	$200
Marijuana	Matthew Thomas Healy	231	1.24%		$100
Total Valid Votes		18,626	100%		
Total Rejected Ballots		193	1.04%		
Turnout		18,819	49.42%		

2005 Electoral Reform Ref.
Side	Vote	%
Yes	9,362	52.45
No	8,486	47.55

B.C. General Election 2001: Richmond Centre
Party	Candidate	Votes	%	±	Expenditures
Liberal	Greg Halsey-Brandt	12,061	71.86%		$36,519
NDP	Jaana Grant	2,206	13.14%		$3,250
Green	Bruce Marshall	1,615	9.62%	–	$144
Unity	Jim Hessels	381	2.27%		$610
Marijuana	Alice Kan-Halford	357	2.13%		$556
Conservative	Frank Peter Tofin	165	0.98%		$100
Total Valid Votes		16,785	100.00%		
Total Rejected Ballots		140	0.83%		
Turnout		16,925	69.10%		

B.C. General Election 1996: Richmond Centre
Party	Candidate	Votes	%	±	Expenditures
Liberal	Doug Symons	9,925	55.52%		$29,312
NDP	Doug Black	5,723	32.01%		$26,329
Progressive Democrat	Rob Oey	996	5.57%	–	$100
Reform	Shamim Akbar	614	3.43%		$2,755
Green	Manoa Friedson	235	1.31%	–	$160
Social Credit	Andrew Biernat	154	0.86%	–	
Libertarian	Kerry Pearson	126	0.70%		
Independent	Joseph Gaudet	65	0.36%		
Natural Law	Mark McCooey	38	0.21%		$100
Total Valid Votes		17,876	100.00%		
Total Rejected Ballots		144	0.80%		
Turnout		18,020	68.67%		

B.C. General Election 1991: Richmond Centre
Party	Candidate	Votes	%	±	Expenditures
Liberal	Douglas Symons	7,806	42.44%		$3,895
NDP	Brian Collins	6,522	35.46%		$34,977
Social Credit	Sheila Page	3,889	21.14%	–	$39,533
Green	Michael Airton	108	0.59%	–	$30
Libertarian	Kerry Pearson	68	0.37%		$33
Total Valid Votes		18,393			
Total Rejected Ballots		390	2.08%		
Turnout		18,783	74.42%		

Richmond Centre had the second lowest turnout (40.97%) in British Columbia at the 2009 provincial election, and the lowest turnout (43.65%) at the 2013 election. During this period, it was considered a safe seat for the British Columbia Liberal Party.

== Student vote results ==
A student vote is a mock election held alongside BC general elections in schools, with the purpose of educating persons under legal age about government and elections.

=== 2024 ===
2024 British Columbia general election
Party	Candidate	Votes	%	±%
Conservative	Hon Chan	414	30.11	
Independent	Dickens Cheung	139	10.11	
Independent	Sunny Ho	113	8.22	
New Democratic	Henry Yao	550	40.00	
Unaffiliated	Wendy Yuan	159	11.56	
Total Valid Votes		1,375		

=== 2013 ===
2013 British Columbia general election
Party	Candidate	Votes	%	±%
Liberal	Teresa Wat	65	34.95	+5.33
Green	Michael Wolfe	57	30.65	+15.27
New Democratic	Frank Yunrong Huang	25	13.44	-42.37
Conservative	Lawrence Chen	14	7.53	New
Independent	Gary Law	13	6.99	New
Independent	Richard Lee	7	3.76	New
Unparty	Chanel Donovan	5	2.69	New
Total Valid Votes		186	100.0	–

=== 2009 ===
2009 British Columbia general election
Party	Candidate	Votes	%	±%
New Democratic	Kam Brar	341	55.81	+26.53
Liberal	Rob Howard	181	29.62	-16.9
Green	Michael Wolfe	94	15.38	+2.55
National Alliance	Kang Chen	58	9.49	New
Total Valid Votes		611	100.0	–
Total rejected/spoiled votes		22	3.16	–
Total Turnout		696	–	–

=== 2009 ===
2009 Electoral Reform Ref.
Option	Votes	%
FPTP	283	51.08
BC-STV	271	48.91

*FPTP = First Past the Post, BC-STV = Single Transferable Vote

=== 2005 ===
2005 British Columbia general election
Party	Candidate	Votes	%
Liberal	Olga Ilich	475	46.52
New Democratic	Dale Jackaman	299	29.28
Green	Chris Segers	131	12.83
Marijuana	Matthew Thomas Healy	116	11.36
Total Valid Votes		1,021	100.0

=== 2005 ===
2005 Electoral Reform Ref.
Side	Votes	%
Yes	499	75
No	165	25

== See also ==
- List of British Columbia provincial electoral districts
- Canadian provincial electoral districts
