= Stieff =

Stieff (or Stief) is a surname of German origin. Notable people of the name include:

- Charles Stieff (1805 – 1862), American industrialist and piano manufacturer
- Hellmuth Stieff (1901 – 1944), general of Nazi Germany
- Dave Stief (1956 – 2000), American football player
- Bo Stief (born 1946), Danish bassist and composer

== Other uses ==
- Stieff Silver
  - Stieff Silver Company Factory
