= Paulette Steeves =

Canadian anthropologist

Paulette F. C. Steeves
- Born: Whitehorse, Yukon, Canada
- Education: University of Arkansas, Binghamton University
- Occupations: Academic, Author
- Employer: Algoma University
- Awards: Canada Research Chair (Tier II, 2019–2029), Algoma University Distinguished Faculty Award (2024), Algoma University Research Excellence Award (2023), American Library Association Choice Outstanding Academic Title (2022)
- Website: https://www.tipdba.ca/; https://www.crscid.com/; https://www.craih.com/; https://paulettesteeves.ca/

Paulette F. C. Steeves is a Cree-Métis anthropologist, archaeologist, and the Tier II Canada Research Chair in Indigenous History: Healing and Reconciliation at Algoma University in Sault Ste. Marie, Ontario.

== Education and career ==
Steeves is Cree-Métis and was born in Whitehorse, Yukon. She spent her formative years in Lillooet, British Columbia, Canada. Steeves holds a BA in Anthropology (Honors Cum Laude) from the University of Arkansas at Fayetteville, where her undergraduate research involved mitochondrial DNA studies supporting the Quapaw Tribe. She earned an MA and PhD in Anthropology from Binghamton University (State University of New York at Binghamton). Her master's thesis was titled "Archaeology, CRM, Academia, and Ethics, and, Akimel O'odham, Type 2 Diabetes: Links to Traditional Food Loss," and her 2015 dissertation, "Decolonising Indigenous Histories: Pleistocene Archeology Sites of the Western Hemisphere," was the first thesis in Anthropology within the United States to employ Indigenous methods and theory.

In 2008, she was awarded the Clifford D. Clark Fellowship for graduate studies. During her graduate studies, Steeves taught at Fort Peck Community College and Selkirk College. After completing her PhD, she served as the interim director of the University of Massachusetts Amherst's Native American Studies Program (2015-2017) and as an Assistant Professor of Anthropology at Mount Allison University (2017-2018).

In 2019, Steeves was appointed as a Tier II Canada Research Chair in Healing and Reconciliation (renewed and expanded to Canada Research Chair in Indigenous History: Healing and Reconciliation for 2024–2029) and joined the faculty of Algoma University as a professor in the Department of Geography, Geology, and Land Stewardship (later also serving as Department Chair).

Paulette Steeves at the Denver Museum of Nature and Science, as a member of the Early Humans in the Americas project

She is a member of the Editorial Board for American Antiquity (2021–2026) and serves on the advisory committee for the Robert S. Peabody Institute of Archaeology.

== Research ==
Steeves' research focuses on decolonizing historical narratives and reclaiming deep Indigenous histories of the Western Hemisphere. Her work centers on Pleistocene-age archaeological sites, arguing that evidence supports an Indigenous presence in the Americas prior to and far exceeding the conventional timeline of approximately 13,000 years ago. She has compiled an extensive database of hundreds of pre-11,200-year-old archaeological sites to support this reclamation.

Her research extends to several related areas of community-engaged scholarship:

- Healing and Reconciliation: Creating educational resources, including a database and maps of residential schools and colonial institutions in Canada (crscid.com).
- Indigenous Food Sovereignty: Leading research on recreating Terra Preta (Amazonian Dark Earths) regenerative soils to address food insecurity in Northern Indigenous and urban communities.
- Indigenous Methodologies: Developing and applying frameworks she terms "Pyroepistomology," emphasizing fire as a metaphor for cleansing, reclaiming knowledge, and responsibilities to future generations.

Steeves at a Nebraska Pleistocene site in 2010

Steeves' first book, The Indigenous Paleolithic of the Western Hemisphere (University of Nebraska Press, 2021), was awarded the American Library Association's Choice Outstanding Academic Title in 2022. Her work has been featured in documentaries, including "Walking with the Ancients" on CBC's The Nature of Things.

== Awards and honors ==
- Algoma University Distinguished Faculty Award (2024)
- Algoma University Research Excellence Award (2023)
- American Library Association (ALA) Choice Outstanding Academic Title for The Indigenous Paleolithic of the Western Hemisphere (2022)
- Tier II Canada Research Chair in Healing and Reconciliation (2019–2024, renewed as Canada Research Chair in Indigenous History: Healing and Reconciliation 2024–2029)
- University of Massachusetts Amherst SBS Research Grant (2016)
- SUNY Binghamton GSEU Professional Development Award (2013)
- American Anthropological Association, Archaeology Division, Student Travel Grant (2012)
- Society for American Archaeology, Arthur C. Parker Scholarship (2010)
- Clifford D. Clark Fellowship, Binghamton University (2008–2013)

== Selected publications ==
=== Books ===
- Steeves, P. (2021). The Indigenous Paleolithic of the Western Hemisphere. University of Nebraska Press.

=== Book chapters ===
- Steeves, P. (2026). Alterity Is a Violent Western Construct: In Indigenous Worldviews, We Are All Related. In O. Moro Abadía & M. Porr (Eds.), Alterity and Human Evolution: Deep-Time and Multispecies Perspectives on Difference and Variation. Berghahn Books.
- Steeves, P. (2025). Pyroepistomology: Re-Claiming and Reciprocity. In S. Hatfield (Ed.), Indigenous Voices: Critical Reflections on Traditional Ecological Knowledge. Oregon State University Press.
- Steeves, P. (2024). Round Dancing and Counting Coup in Academic Circles with Vine Deloria, Jr. In D. Wilkins (Ed.), A Tribute to Vine Deloria, Jr. University of Nebraska Press.
- Steeves, P. (2024). My Indian Name is Pyroepistomology: Fire is a Cleansing Path. In G. Nicholas & J. Watkins (Eds.), Being and Becoming an Indigenous Archaeologist (2nd ed.). Routledge.
- Steeves, P. (2023). Listening to the Land: Honoring Ancestors. In K. Horn-Miller & M. Kress (Eds.), Land as Relation: Teaching and Learning through Place, People, and Practices. Canadian Scholars.
- Steeves, P. (2022). We Have Always Been Here; Reclaiming and Rewriting Indigenous Histories of Turtle Island. Being Legendary at the Royal Ontario Museum: Confronting Colonialism, Rethinking History. Art Canada Institute.
- Steeves, P. (2021). Singing to Ancestors Respecting and Re-telling Stories Woven Through Ancient Ancestral Lands. In A. McGrath & L. Russell (Eds.), The Routledge Companion to Indigenous Global History. Routledge.
- Steeves, P. (2020). Entries in C. Smith (Ed.), Encyclopedia of Global Archaeology (2nd ed.). Springer: “Indigenous Method and Theory in Archaeology”; “La Sena”; “Deloria Jr., Vine”; “Mesa Verde”; “Clovis and Folsom, Indigenous Occupation Prior to”.
- Steeves, P. (2019). Our Earliest Ancestors: Human and Non-Human Primates of North America. In M. Porr & J. Matthews (Eds.), Interrogating Human Origins: Decolonization and the Deep Human Past. Routledge.

=== Articles ===
- Steeves, P. (2025). Introduction • Pyroepistomology: Reclaiming Knowledge, Histories, Lands, Relations. American Indian Culture and Research Journal, 48(3).
- Wabie, J.-L., Walker, J., Monague, N. H., Elliott, M., Steeves, P., et al. (2025). Niigaaniiwin: Vision and Spirit of Our Journey. Turtle Island Journal of Indigenous Health, 1(4).
- Steeves, P. (2021). "Incomplete Indigenous landscapes." Science 374, no. 6570: 945-945.
- Steeves, P. (2018). “Indigeneity.” In Oxford Bibliographies in Anthropology. Ed. John Jackson. Oxford University Press.
- Steeves, P. (2017). Unpacking Neoliberal Archaeological Control of Ancient Indigenous Heritage. Archaeologies, 13(1), 48–65.
- Steeves, P. (2015). Academia, Archaeology, CRM, and Tribal Historic Preservation. Archaeologies, 11(1), 121–141.
- Steeves, P. (2015). Decolonizing the Past and Present of the Western Hemisphere (The Americas). Archaeologies, 11(1), 42–69.
