= Teresa Wat =

Canadian politician

Teresa Wat MLA
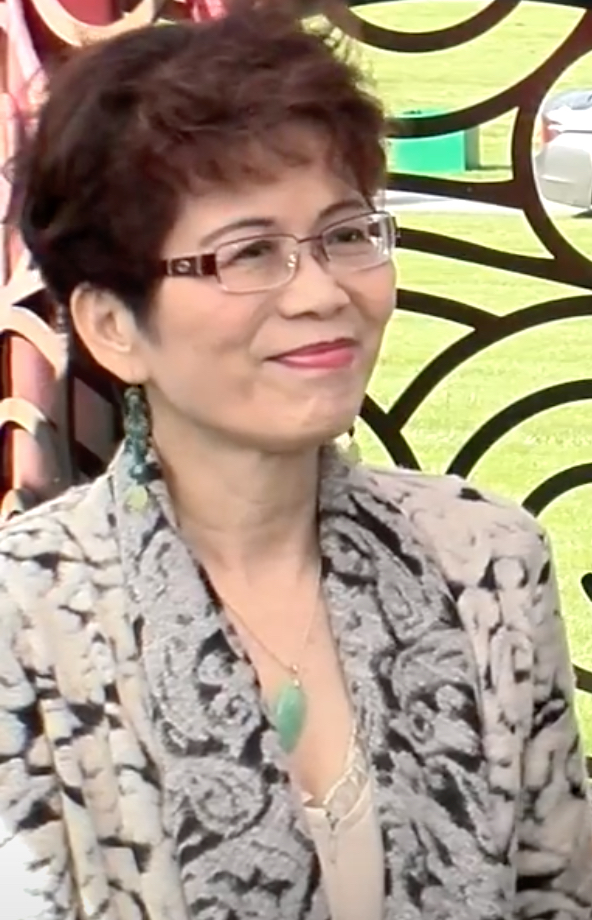
- Wat in 2016

41st Speaker of the Legislative Assembly of British Columbia
- Assuming office TBD
- Succeeding: Raj Chouhan

Member of the British Columbia Legislative Assembly
- Incumbent
- Assumed office October 19, 2024
- Preceded by: Constituency established
- Constituency: Richmond-Bridgeport
- In office May 9, 2017 – October 19, 2024
- Preceded by: Constituency established
- Succeeded by: Constituency redistributed
- Constituency: Richmond North Centre
- In office May 14, 2013 – May 9, 2017
- Preceded by: Rob Howard
- Succeeded by: Constituency redistributed
- Constituency: Richmond Centre

Personal details
- Born: 1950 (age 75–76) British Hong Kong
- Party: BC Conservative (2024–2026, 2026–present)
- Other political affiliations: BC Liberal (2013-2024); Independent (2026); CentreBC (2026)
- Education: University of Hawaii (MA)

Teresa Wat (born 1950) is a Canadian politician who is the incoming Speaker of the Legislative Assembly of British Columbia, having been nominated for the position in 2026. She has served as a member of the Legislative Assembly (MLA) representing the electoral district of Richmond-Bridgeport since 2013. She was appointed Minister of International Trade, and Minister Responsible for the Asia Pacific Strategy and Multiculturalism in 2013 by Premier Christy Clark. Initially elected as a member of the BC Liberal Party, Wat crossed the floor in 2024 to join the Conservative Party.

== Early life and education ==
Wat was born in British Hong Kong. She has said she was a keen reader as a child and shared her father's interest in current affairs, which led her to major in journalism. She earned a master's degree in communications from the University of Hawaii. She moved to Canada in 1989.

== Early career ==
Before entering politics, Wat worked as news director at Channel M Multivision Television (now OMNI), where, according to her party biography, she helped launch the first live daily multilingual newscasts in British Columbia, including the first daily Punjabi newscast. She later served as president and CEO of Mainstream Broadcasting Corporation (CHMB AM1320), a multicultural broadcaster.

In 2010, she was appointed to the Canadian Women Voters Congress Advisory Board and was named one of British Columbia's top 100 most influential women by the Vancouver Sun. She has also served on the board of the School of Journalism at the University of British Columbia.

== Political career ==
Wat was first elected in the 2013 provincial election as a member of the BC Liberal Party (renamed BC United in 2023), succeeding retiring Liberal MLA Rob Howard in Richmond Centre. Premier Christy Clark appointed her Minister of International Trade and Minister Responsible for the Asia Pacific Strategy and Multiculturalism; she held the portfolio from 2013 to 2017.

Wat was re-elected in Richmond North Centre in 2017, with about 52 per cent of the vote, and in 2020, with about 51 per cent. In Opposition, Wat has held a number of critic roles, including critic for Trade; Tourism, Arts, Culture and Anti-Racism Initiatives; and, since May 2024, shadow minister for Multiculturalism, Anti-Racism Initiatives, Arts and Culture.

=== Move to the Conservatives (2024) ===
On July 29, 2024, BC United said Wat was leaving the party to join the Conservative Party of British Columbia, becoming the fourth BC United member of the legislature to do so. She was elected as a Conservative in Richmond-Bridgeport in the 2024 election.

=== Departure from the Conservative caucus and CentreBC (2026) ===
On August 26, 2026, Wat left the Conservative caucus to sit as an independent, saying party leader Kerry-Lynne Findlay had made "unfounded accusations", including remarks that called her allegiance to Canada into question. My Cariboo Now reported that the remarks, allegedly made in a leaked group chat, were described as suggesting an affiliation with the Chinese Communist Party; Findlay said she had apologized to Wat during a July 29 phone call, while Wat said the promised apology had not materialized. Wat was one of several Conservative MLAs to leave the caucus in the following weeks.

On September 11, 2026, Wat said she had joined a new political group led by former Conservative MLA Peter Milobar. On September 18, CBC reported that she was among eight MLAs confirmed as members of CentreBC. On September 22, after Findlay had resigned as Conservative leader and Premier David Eby had called a snap election, Wat and several other former Conservative MLAs returned to the Conservative caucus.

=== 2026 election ===
In the initial count for the October 24, 2026 provincial election, Wat received 9,390 votes in Richmond-Bridgeport, compared with 4,360 for New Democratic Party candidate Linda Li. These were 68.29% and 31.71% of the 13,750 valid votes, respectively; Elections BC's results page lists 67.84% and 31.50%, calculated on all ballots considered, including 92 rejected ballots. The results were preliminary as of October 27, 2026, with the final count scheduled for November 6–10.

== Awards and honours ==
According to her party biography, Wat's honours include:

- Belgium: Grand Officer of the Order of the Crown
- Canada: Queen Elizabeth II Diamond Jubilee Medal, for community service

She has also been named one of British Columbia's 100 most influential women by the Vancouver Sun.

== Personal life ==
Wat's husband, Stephen, whom she met as a fellow journalism student in Hong Kong, died in 2011. She has said he encouraged her to give back to the community, which prompted her to enter politics. She has a daughter, who grew up in Richmond.

== Electoral history ==
2026 British Columbia general election: Richmond-Bridgeport
Party	Candidate	Votes	%	±%	Expenditures
Conservative	Teresa Wat	10,145	67.46		
New Democratic	Linda Li	4,789	31.84		
Total valid votes		14,934	99.30		
Total rejected ballots		105	0.70		
Turnout		15,039			
Registered voters					
Conservative hold		Swing		+6.46	
Source: Elections BC

2024 British Columbia general election: Richmond-Bridgeport
Party	Candidate	Votes	%	±%	Expenditures
Conservative	Teresa Wat	9,908	58.19	+57.0	$48,294.00
New Democratic	Linda Li	5,921	34.77	-6.1	$36,634.04
Green	Tamás Revóczi	547	3.21	-4.7	$1,148.70
Independent	Glynnis Hoi Sum Chan	519	3.05	–	$9,838.43
Independent	Charlie Smith	132	0.78	–	$0.00
Total valid votes/expense limit		17,027	99.68	–	$71,700.08
Total rejected ballots		54	0.32	–	
Turnout		17,081	48.63	–	
Registered voters		35,127			
Conservative notional gain from BC United		Swing		N/A (Note: Swing cannot be calculated as BC United did not run a candidate in this riding.)	
Source: Elections BC

2020 British Columbia general election: Richmond North Centre
Party	Candidate	Votes	%	±%	Expenditures
Liberal	Teresa Wat	7,675	51.26	−1.22	$41,998.62
New Democratic	Jaeden Dela Torre	5,964	39.83	+5.79	$6,837.05
Green	Vernon Wang	1,333	8.90	−1.57	$52.72
Total valid votes/expense limit		14,972	100.00	–	$66,123.96
Total rejected ballots		146	0.97	−0.01	
Turnout		15,118	40.36	−7.70	
Registered voters		37,459			
Liberal hold		Swing		−3.51	
Source: Elections BC

2017 British Columbia general election: Richmond North Centre
Party	Candidate	Votes	%	Expenditures
Liberal	Teresa Wat	7,916	52.48	$64,973
New Democratic	Lyren Chiu	5,135	34.04	$19,215
Green	Ryan Kemp Marciniw	1,579	10.47	$489
Independent	Dong Pan	336	2.23	$3,687
Action	John Crocock	117	0.78	$0
Total valid votes		15,083	100.00	
Total rejected ballots		149	0.98	
Turnout		15,232	48.06	
Registered voters		31,695		
Source: Elections BC

2013 British Columbia general election: Richmond Centre
Party	Candidate	Votes	%	±%	Expenditures
Liberal	Teresa Wat	9,462	49.83	–11.68	$65,821.00
New Democratic	Frank Yunrong Huang	4,436	23.36	–5.68	$39,418.13
Green	Michael Wolfe	1,678	8.84	+1.72	$0.00
Independent	Gary Law	1,617	8.51	—	$46,245.00
Conservative	Lawrence Chen	961	5.06	—	$4,363.30
Independent	Richard Lee	754	3.97	—	$9,441.32
Unparty	Chanel Donovan	82	0.43	—	$165.31
Total valid votes/expense limit		18,990	100.00	—	$73,218.39
Total rejected ballots		180	0.94	–0.04	
Turnout		19,170	43.65	+2.63	
Registered voters		43,915			
Liberal hold		Swing		–3.00	
Source: Elections BC

== See also ==
- Wat (surname)
