= Richard Steeves =

American serial killer

- Born: Richard Edward Steeves; February 1, 1942 (age 84); Waterville, Maine, U.S.
- Conviction: Murder
- Penalty: Life imprisonment

Details
- Victims: 6
- Span of crimes: 1965–1985
- Country: United States
- States: Maine, New Hampshire, Ohio
- Date apprehended: For the final time in May 1985
- Imprisoned at: Mountain View Correctional Facility

Richard Edward Steeves (born February 1, 1942) is an American serial killer. From 1965 to 1966, Steeves killed five people in three states, crimes for which he was tried but acquitted for by reason of insanity. He spent over a decade in mental hospitals before his eventual release into society, before he was arrested for the murder of his neighbor in Maine. For the latter crime, he was convicted and sentenced to life imprisonment.

== Early life ==
Richard Edward Steeves was born in Waterville, Maine on February 1, 1942. When he was 5 years old, his father committed suicide, and soon after his mother gave him up to an orphanage. According to Steeves, his violent behavior stemmed from sexual abuse beginning in his childhood. Steeves dropped out of school in eighth grade, and afterwards he began committing petty crimes which landed him in a reformatory. Once an adult his behavior did not change, and he spent most of his time in and out of jail. During his incarceration, Steeves was often heard threatening to kill guards and other inmates. He was last released in 1965.

== 1965–66 murders ==
On June 13, 1965, five months after his release, Steeves attacked 83-year-old Harry Staples in North Berwick, Maine. He beat Staples viciously with his own cane. Steeves fled the scene. Staples was found clinging to life and was rushed to the hospital, where he was treated for two weeks in intensive care until he eventually died. In the investigation following, police interviewed numerous suspects, but Steeves remained free.

On June 19, Steeves broke into the home of 70-year-old Ralph Mace in rural Rochester, New Hampshire. He brandished a knife and stabbed Mace six times before leaving the home, assuming he was dead. He was eventually found but died later the same day. Two months later, on August 14, he returned to Augusta, Maine, where he invaded the cabin of 73-year-old Lorenzo D. Troyer. Steeves attacked Troyer and brutally beat him with a blunt object. He fled the home after Troyer fell unconscious. Troyer was found by his friend Thomas Landrey, who ran to a nearby house and alerted that Troyer was almost dead. They called the police who hurried him to a nearby hospital, where he died the next day.

In January 1966, Steeves left the New England area and drove to Ohio. There, when his car broke down, he befriended 84-year-old Lewis Gephart and his 35-year-old son Francis. They invited Steeves back to their home in Coshocton, where, on January 3, he bludgeoned both to death. Steeves then stole Francis' car and drove back to New Hampshire.

== First arrest, imprisonment and release ==
By this time, Steeves was wanted for the three murders he committed in New England, and he was arrested at a restaurant in New Hampshire. They recovered the car he was driving, and since it was registered to Francis, he was charged with their murders.

Steeves was charged with three of the murders in Ohio and New Hampshire but was not charged with the murders in Maine. A trial started in New Hampshire, and Steeves admitted responsibility, though he pleaded not guilty by reason of insanity. After further research, the New Hampshire Supreme Court stopped the trial and automatically acquitted Steeves by reason of insanity. Afterwards he was transferred to the Concord Mental Hospital. In 1971, Steeves filed an affidavit requesting to be extradited to Ohio for a speedy trial.

On December 14, 1971, he arrived in Ohio, but for the next six months he had to undergo psychiatric exams. He had to return to New Hampshire after a while. In 1980, nurses and psychiatrists stated that Steeves was no longer a threat to society, and he was allowed to leave the hospital grounds without an escort. In 1983, having still not been tried for the Ohio and Maine murders, Ohio prosecutor William Owens decided to not prosecute Steeves for the murders. In the mid-1980s, Steeves took an agreement which allowed him to serve 3 to 7 years in prison.

== Murder of Russell Bailey ==
In 1984, Steeves was paroled from prison and was sent to live with his brother in Unity, Maine. In April 1985, Steeves broke into the mobile home of 69-year-old gift shop owner Russell F. Bailey in Wells. He attacked Bailey and struck him in the head with a blunt instrument, likely a club, multiple times in the head, killing him. He left the home not long after. A relative of Bailey who lived nearby visited his home after having not spoken to him for a few days. They entered the home and found his body on April 29. The following month, witnesses came forward with information that they saw Steeves' pickup truck parked in front of Bailey's driveway the day of the murder.

== Second arrest, trial and imprisonment ==
Steeves was interviewed about Bailey's murder by Robert Hohler, a reporter for the Concord Monitor. Steeves gave conflicting statements; he stated that Bailey loaned him $1,000 for sexual favors, and that someone else killed him, but he also said that he had a vivid dream-like memory of killing Bailey. During his interrogation, Steeves stated that he began to question his faith in God. Steeves was charged with Bailey's murder. At the same time, Maine authorities also decided to prosecute him for the 1965 murder of Harold Staples, who was known to have been Steeves' first victim for decades, but up to that point he had not been charged with the killing.

While awaiting trial, Steeves had to be moved from the York County Jail to the Maine State Prison for his own protection, after he attempted suicide two times. He did not pursue an insanity defense for the murder, nor did he testify during his trial. His lawyer, however, contested that his client was innocent and was framed by the real killer. Steeves was found guilty and sentenced to life imprisonment.

In 1987, Steeves' attorney Ricky Brunette sought a new trial for Steeves. Brunette claimed that testimony that had been ruled inadmissible by Justice Arthur Brennan would have contradicted denials by a different man, who they claimed was the real killer. Brunette also claimed the jury did not have enough evidence to back up the guilty verdict. In 2017, Steeves publicly announced he felt he was safe enough to be freed from prison. He claims he had been rehabilitated, though he remains imprisoned at Maine State Prison. He was diagnosed with Parkinson's disease.

As of 2026, Steeves is incarcerated on life sentence at the Mountain View Correctional Facility.

== See also ==
- List of serial killers in the United States
