= Richmond South Centre =

Defunct provincial electoral district in British Columbia, Canada

British Columbia electoral district
- Location in Richmond, British Columbia
- Coordinates: 49.1658°N 123.1041°W

Defunct provincial electoral district
- Legislature: Legislative Assembly of British Columbia
- District created: 2015
- District abolished: 2022
- First contested: 2017
- Last contested: 2020

Demographics
- Population (2011): 47,010
- Electors (2017): 30,094

Richmond South Centre is a former provincial electoral district for the Legislative Assembly of British Columbia, Canada, in use from 2017 to 2024.

The riding was created with territory taken from Richmond Centre, Richmond East, and Richmond-Steveston in the 2015 electoral redistribution. It was first contested in the general election of 2017. Following the 2021 British Columbia electoral redistribution, which took effect via the 2024 eleection, the riding was redistributed into Richmond Centre, Richmond-Steveston and Richmond-Queensborough.

== Demographics ==
Population, 2014	50,101
Area (km^{2})	7

== Members of the Legislative Assembly ==
This riding has elected the following members of the Legislative Assembly:

Richmond South Centre
Assembly	Years	Member	Party
Richmond Centre, Richmond East and Richmond-Steveston prior to 2017
41st	2017–2020	Linda Reid	Liberal
42nd	2020–2024	Henry Yao	New Democratic
Dissolved into Richmond Centre

== Election results ==
Graph of the election results in Richmond South Centre (minor parties that never got 2% of the vote or didn't run consistently are omitted)

2020 British Columbia general election
Party	Candidate	Votes	%	±%	Expenditures
New Democratic	Henry Yao	6,743	50.67	+10.39	$37,030.55
Liberal	Alexa Loo	6,564	49.33	+0.61	$50,107.69
Total valid votes		13,307	100.00	–	
Rejected ballots		207	1.53	+0.34	
Turnout		13,514	40.12	−6.58	
Registered voters		33,685			
New Democratic gain from Liberal		Swing		+4.89	
Source: Elections BC

2018 British Columbia electoral reform referendum
Side	Votes	%
First Past the Post	7,663	74.29
Proportional Representation	2,652	25.71
Total valid votes	10,315	100.00
Total rejected ballots	54	0.52
Source: Elections BC

2017 British Columbia general election
Party	Candidate	Votes	%	Expenditures
Liberal	Linda Reid	6,914	48.72	$68,363
New Democratic	Chak Au	5,716	40.28	$71,475
Green	Greg Powell	1,561	11.00	$379
Total valid votes		14,191	100.00	–
Total rejected ballots		171	1.19	
Turnout		14,362	46.70	
Registered voters		30,753		
Source: Elections BC

== Student vote results ==
Student Vote Canada is a non-partisan program in Canada that holds mock elections in elementary and high schools alongside general elections (with the same candidates and same electoral system).

2020 British Columbia general election
Party	Candidate	Votes	%	±%
New Democratic	Henry Yao	666	62.3	+17.99
Liberal	Alexa Loo	403	37.7	+8.51
Total valid votes		1,069	100.0	–
Source: Student Vote Canada

2017 British Columbia general election
Party	Candidate	Votes	%
New Democratic	Chak Au	935	44.31
Liberal	Linda Reid	616	29.19
Green	Greg Powell	559	26.49
Total valid votes		2,110	100.0

== See also ==
- List of British Columbia provincial electoral districts
- Canadian provincial electoral districts
