= Harold Steves =

Canadian politician

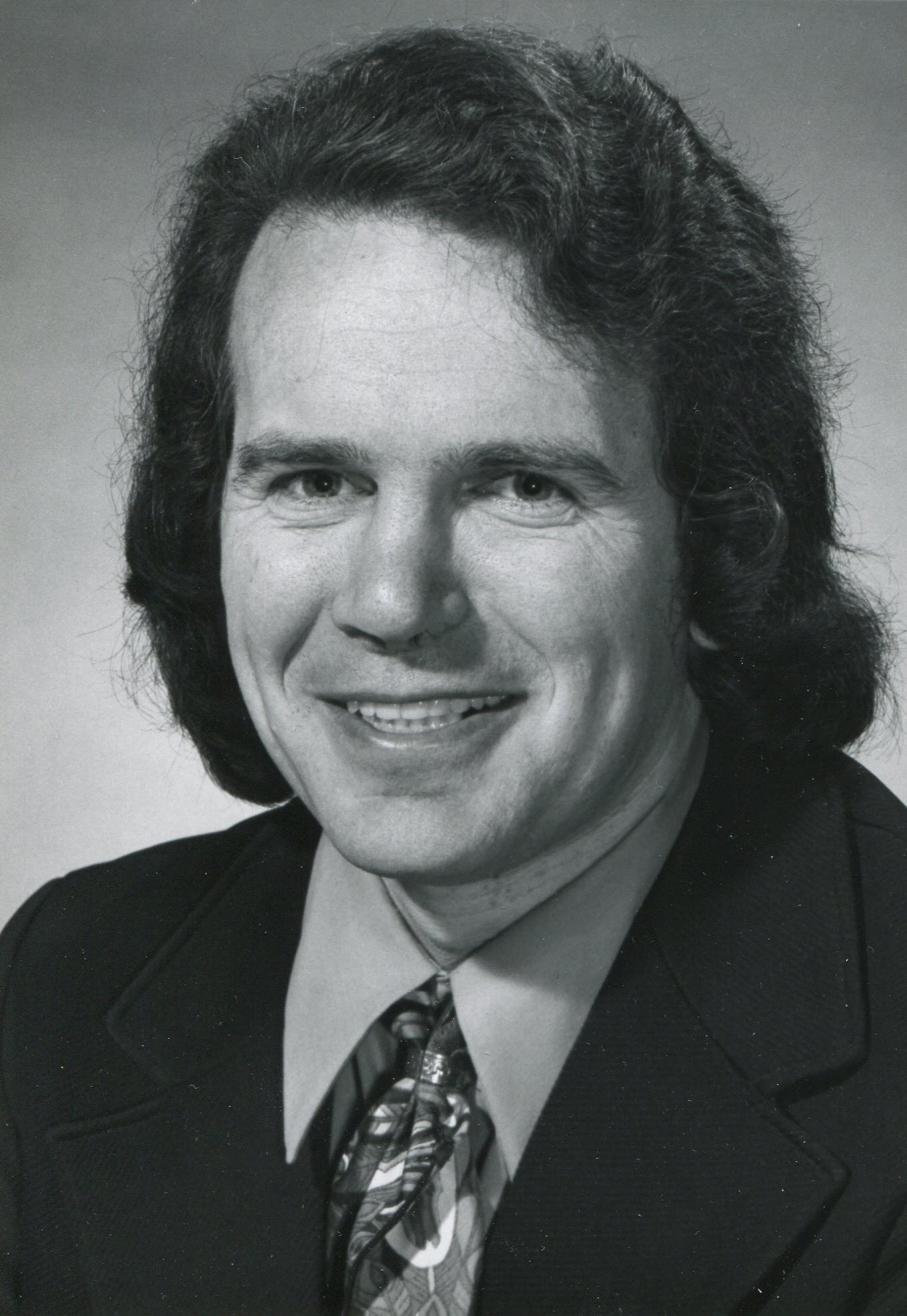

MLA for Richmond
- In office 1972–1975
- Preceded by: Ernest LeCours
- Succeeded by: Jim Nielsen

Personal details
- Born: May 29, 1937 (age 89) Richmond, British Columbia
- Party: New Democratic Party of British Columbia

Harold Steves (born May 29, 1937) is a Canadian politician. Steves was a longtime city councillor on Richmond, British Columbia City Council, first elected in 1969 and re-elected in 1977, after serving one term as the New Democratic Party of British Columbia MLA from 1972 to 1975. He retired from Council in October 2022.

== Personal life ==
Harold Steves is a descendant of Heinrich Stief and Regina Stahlecker, founders of the Steeves family in North America. Other notable descendants of Heinrich and Regina include William Steeves, a Father of Canadian Confederation. The Steves family, which changed the spelling of their surname upon moving west, is one of Richmond's first founding families, after which the community of Steveston is named. Manoah and Martha Steves were the first settlers in the area, arriving in 1877. They imported the first purebred Holstein cattle into British Columbia, established a dairy to provide milk for the fledgling City of Vancouver and were Western Canada's first seedsmen. Born of Maude and Harold Sr., Harold and wife Kathy reside in the old Steves farmhouse, built in 1917, on what is now an 11-acre (45,000 m^{2}) cattle farm surrounded by residential development. Steves is a graduate of the University of British Columbia with a BSc in agriculture.

== Political life ==
In the late 1950s, Richmond Council rezoned 12,000 acres of farmland for residential use. The Steves farm was rezoned against their wishes. As a result, the Steves were not permitted to build a new dairy for a bulk tank when the milk company stopped picking up milk in cans. They went out of the milk business and switched to beef cattle. Steves began a campaign to save farmland. However, when the farm was assessed residential taxes his father appealed the assessment and lost and subsequently sold most of the farm. In the mid-1960s Steves drafted the initial resolutions to NDP conventions to establish an Agricultural Land Bank system in British Columbia and drafted the Agricultural Land Zone policy for the 1972 election. As an MLA he was active in the establishment of the British Columbia Agricultural Land Reserve in 1973 under the Dave Barrett NDP Government and for the following decades, was one of its strongest defenders. He is active in the Farmland Defence League.

In 1978, Steves bought Back Valley Ranch at Cache Creek. It is now owned by the oldest son, Jerry who raises grass fed beef and direct markets it, cut, wrapped and frozen, through the internet at www.stevesfarm.com

Steves is the past chair of the Metro Vancouver Agriculture Committee and is promoting farmland preservation, urban agriculture and food security for the region. He represented Richmond as second director on the board of directors of Metro Vancouver for many years. He was the Lower Mainland Treaty Advisory Committee rep at the treaty table for the Tsawwassen First Nation treaty negotiations.

In the late 1960s, Steves co-founded the Richmond Anti-Pollution Association, one of the first environmental advocacy groups in Canada. Steves is a director of the BC Groundfish Development Authority which administers quotas for the groundfish industry to prevent over fishing. He is a former director of the Steveston Harbour Authority, and is still actively promoting harbour redevelopment and establishment of new fishing businesses.

Steves was chair of the Parks and Recreation & Cultural Services Committee and a member of the Planning Committee of Richmond Council for most of the 51 years he was on Council. In 2023, the Planning Institute of BC named Steves as an Honorary Member. Steves represents Richmond on the Metro Vancouver Agricultural Advisory Committee, and is chair of the board of the Britannia Heritage Shipyard National Historic Site Society.

In 2026, Steves endorsed Avi Lewis in that year's federal NDP leadership race.

== Electoral record ==
Top 8 candidates elected — Incumbents marked with "(X)". Elected members' names are in bold

2018 British Columbia municipal elections: Richmond City Council
Party	Council candidate	Vote	%
RITE Richmond	**Carol Day** (X)	20,871	7.01
Richmond Citizens' Association	**Harold Steves** (X)	19,136	6.43
Richmond Community Coalition	**Chak Au** (X)	18,026	6.05
Richmond First	**Bill McNulty** (X)	17,242	5.79
Richmond Citizens' Association	**Kelly Greene**	16,464	5.53
Richmond First	**Linda McPhail** (X)	15,521	5.21
RITE Richmond	**Michael Wolfe**	13,627	4.58
Independent	**Alexa Loo** (X)	13,212	4.44
Richmond First	Derek Dang (X)	13,115	4.40
Richmond First	Andy Hobbs	12,336	4.14
Richmond Citizens' Association	Judie Schneider	11,672	3.92
Richmond Community Coalition	Ken Johnston (X)	11,161	3.75
Richmond Community Coalition	Jonathan Ho	11,140	3.74
Richmond Citizens' Association	Jack Trovato	10,915	3.67
Richmond First	Sunny Ho	8,933	3.00
RITE Richmond	Niti Sharma	8,917	2.99
RITE Richmond	Henry Yao	8,467	2.84
Richmond First	Peter Liu	8,357	2.81
Richmond Community Coalition	Parm Bains	7,973	2.68
Independent	John Roston	7,961	2.67
Richmond Community Coalition	Melissa Zhang	7,708	2.38
Independent	Kerry Starchuk	6,959	2.34
Independent	Jason Tarnow	5,720	1.92
Independent	Adil Awan	4,278	1.44
Independent	Manjit Singh	4,134	1.39
Independent	Dennis Page	3,478	1.17
Independent	Andy Chiang	3,337	1.12
Independent	Theresa Head	3,251	1.09
Independent	Patrick J. Saunders	2,241	0.75
Independent	Zhe Zhang	2,241	0.75
