= Manoah Steves =

Canadian politician (1828–1897)

Manoah Steves (originally Steeves; 1828–1897) was the founder of Steveston, British Columbia, which is named in his honour. The village has since been amalgamated into the city of Richmond in Metro Vancouver.

== Family ==
Steves was a descendant of Heinrich Stief and Regina Stahlecker, founders of the Steeves family in North America. As a Stief descendant, Steves is a second cousin of William Steeves, a Father of Canadian Confederation. He is also the great-grandfather of Richmond politician Harold Steves, who as of 2021 owns the farm founded by Manoah.

== Life ==
Born in New Brunswick, in 1868 Steves moved to Ontario with his wife Martha, followed by a brief sojourn in the American state of Maryland. In 1877, they moved to Lulu Island and purchased 400 acres in the southwest part of the island. Sometime after moving west, Steves replaced the double-e in his surname with a single "e". Upon settling on Lulu Island, Steves established a dairy farm and imported the first purebred Holstein cattle into British Columbia. Steves was one of the petitioners asking the province to incorporate the city of Richmond. After incorporation, Steves served on the first town council, in 1879.

== Legacy ==
In addition to the village of Steveston, Steves Elementary School and Steveston Post Office are named after Manoah Steves.

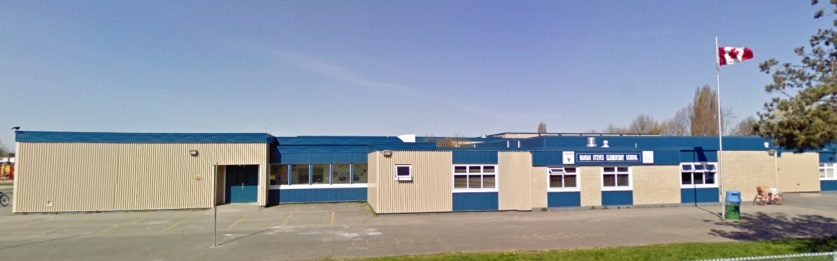

Manoah Steves Elementary School
