= Richmond City Council (British Columbia) =

Municipal government of Richmond, British Columbia, Canada

Type
- Type: City Council

Leadership
- Mayor: Malcolm Brodie

Structure
- Seats: 8 Councillors and 1 mayor
- Political groups: RITE Richmond: 3 ONE Richmond: 2 Richmond Community: 1 Richmond RISE: 1 Richmond United: 1 Independent: 1

Elections
- Voting system: Plurality at-large voting
- Last election: 15 October 2022
- Next election: 17 October 2026

Meeting place
- Richmond City Hall; Richmond, BC

Website
- www.richmond.ca

Richmond City Council is the governing body of the city of Richmond, British Columbia, Canada. The council consists of the mayor and eight elected city councillors. Like Vancouver City Council, the councillors are not elected to represent wards like most Canadian cities.

Municipal elections are held every four years across the Province on the third Saturday of October.

== Membership ==
=== 2026–Present ===
See also: 2026 municipal election

Name	Party	Position
Rod Howard	Richmond Forward	Mayor
Gary Law	Advance Richmond	Councillor
Carol Day	RITE Richmond	Councillor
Kevin Lai	Advance Richmond	Councillor
Sheldon Starett	Advance Richmond	Councillor
Michael Wolfe	RITE Richmond	Councillor
Andy Hobbs	Richmond United	Councillor
Laura Gillanders	RITE Richmond	Councillor
Kenny Chiu	Common Sense Alliance	Councillor

=== 2022–2026 ===
Name	Party	Position
Malcolm Brodie	Independent	Mayor
Chak Au	Richmond Community Coalition	Councillor (until February 1, 2026)
Carol Day	RITE Richmond	Councillor
Bill McNulty	ONE Richmond	Councillor
Alexa Loo	ONE Richmond	Councillor
Michael Wolfe	RITE Richmond	Councillor
Andy Hobbs	Richmond United	Councillor
Laura Gillanders	RITE Richmond	Councillor
Kash Heed	Richmond RISE	Councillor

=== 2021–2022 ===
Name	Party	Position
Malcolm Brodie	Independent	Mayor
Chak Au	Richmond Community Coalition	Councillor
Carol Day	RITE Richmond	Councillor
Andy Hobbs (Note: After the resignation of Kelly Greene, Hobbs won in the 2021 by-election.)	Independent	Councillor
Alexa Loo	Independent	Councillor
Bill McNulty	Richmond First	Councillor
Linda McPhail	Richmond First	Councillor
Harold Steves	Richmond Citizens' Association	Councillor
Michael Wolfe	RITE Richmond	Councillor

=== 2018–2021 ===
Name	Party	Position
Malcolm Brodie	Independent	Mayor
Chak Au	Richmond Community Coalition	Councillor
Carol Day	RITE Richmond	Councillor
Kelly Greene (Note: Kelly Greene resigned on 16 November 2020 to fulfill her duties as MLA for Richmond-Steveston. A by-election was held on 29 May 2021 to replace her.)	Richmond Citizens' Association	Councillor
Alexa Loo	Independent	Councillor
Bill McNulty	Richmond First	Councillor
Linda McPhail	Richmond First	Councillor
Harold Steves	Richmond Citizens' Association	Councillor
Michael Wolfe	RITE Richmond	Councillor

=== 2014–2018 ===
Name	Party	Position
Malcolm Brodie	Independent	Mayor
Chak Au	Richmond Community Coalition	Councillor
Derek Dang	Richmond First	Councillor
Carol Day	RITE Richmond	Councillor
Ken Johnston	Richmond Community Coalition	Councillor
Alexa Loo	Independent	Councillor
Bill McNulty	Richmond First	Councillor
Linda McPhail	Richmond First	Councillor
Harold Steves	Independent	

=== 2011–2014 ===
Name	Party	Position
Malcolm Brodie	Independent	Mayor
Chak Au	RITE Richmond	Councillor
Linda Barnes	Richmond Citizens' Association	Councillor
Derek Dang	Richmond First	Councillor
Evelina Halsey-Brandt	Independent	Councillor
Ken Johnston	Richmond First	Councillor
Bill McNulty	Richmond First	Councillor
Linda McPhail	Richmond First	Councillor
Harold Steves	Richmond Citizens' Association	Councillor

=== 2008–2011 ===
Name	Party	Position
Malcolm Brodie	Independent	Mayor
Linda Barnes	Richmond Citizens' Association	Councillor
Evelina Halsey-Brandt	Independent	Councillor
Greg Halsey-Brandt	Independent	Councillor
Sue Halsey-Brandt	RITE Richmond	Councillor
Derek Dang	Richmond First	Councillor
Ken Johnston	Richmond First	Councillor
Bill McNulty	Richmond First	Councillor
Harold Steves	Richmond Citizens' Association	Councillor
