= Linda Reid =

Canadian politician

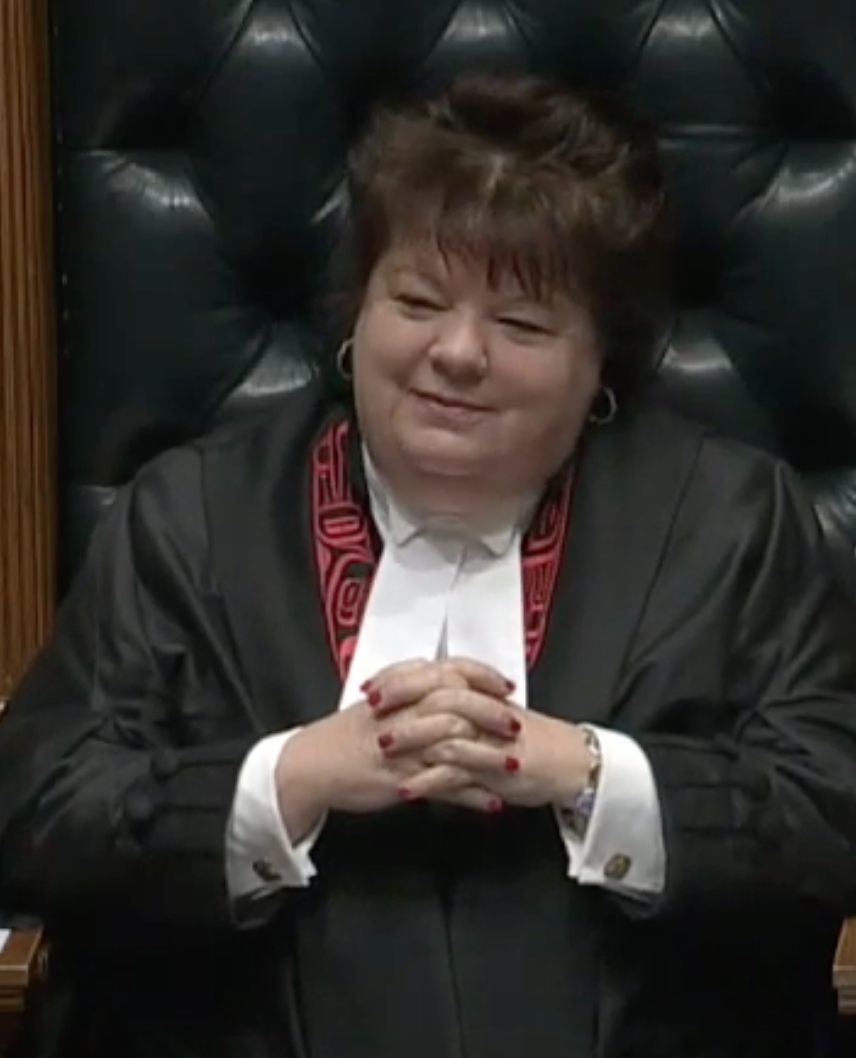

37th Speaker of the Legislative Assembly of British Columbia
- In office June 26, 2013 – June 22, 2017
- Preceded by: Bill Barisoff
- Succeeded by: Steve Thomson

Member of the British Columbia Legislative Assembly for Richmond South Centre Richmond East (1991-2017)
- In office October 17, 1991 – November 24, 2020
- Preceded by: Riding established
- Succeeded by: Henry Yao

Personal details
- Born: June 27, 1959 (age 67) Vancouver, British Columbia
- Party: Liberal
- Spouse: Sheldon Friesen (m. 1997)
- Education: University of British Columbia
- Occupation: Teacher

Linda Reid (born June 27, 1959) is a Canadian politician who served as a member of the Legislative Assembly (MLA) of British Columbia, representing Richmond East from 1991 to 2017, and Richmond South Centre from 2017 to 2020. A caucus member of the British Columbia Liberal Party, she served in the cabinets of premiers Gordon Campbell and Christy Clark as Minister of State for Early Childhood Development from 2001 to 2005, Minister of State for Childcare from 2005 to 2009, and Minister of Advanced Education in 2017. She was also the 37th Speaker of the Legislative Assembly of British Columbia from 2013 to 2017.

== Early life ==
Reid was born in Vancouver, British Columbia in 1959. She graduated from the University of British Columbia with a Bachelor of Education degree in 1982, before proceeding with graduate studies at the same institution specializing in education, exceptional learners, language acquisition, and public administration, receiving her Master of Arts degree in 1987. She worked for the Richmond School District as a language therapist, teacher and school administrator prior to entering politics.

== Politics ==
Running as a BC Liberal candidate, she was first elected MLA for Richmond East in the 1991 provincial election, and was re-elected in that riding in 1996, 2001, 2005, 2009 and 2013. While the Liberals were the Official Opposition, she served in various critic roles, including children and families, health, attorney general, municipal affairs, and science, technology and research. She was also the Opposition Caucus Chair from 1991 to 1992. She contested the 1993 Liberal leadership election and finished in fourth place.

With the Liberals gaining power in 2001, Reid was appointed to the cabinet that June by Premier Gordon Campbell to serve as Minister of State for Early Childhood Development; the position was modified to Minister of State for Childcare in June 2005. In that time, she oversaw the creation of 6,000 new childcare spaces in British Columbia. In 2002, Reid created an individualized funding model for children with autism spectrum disorder which takes into account the individual needs of each child and is provided on a monthly basis. Also in 2002, Reid announced the creation of the BC Early Childhood Development Legacy Fund, which supports community initiatives to support children under the age of 6. She also oversaw the Boost BC program in 2007, which distributed free booster seats to low-income families to coincide with the passing of new requirements that children between 20–40 lbs use a booster seat in vehicles. Opposition New Democratic Party (NDP) MLAs were not given the opportunity to distribute the car seats like their Liberal counterparts, although Reid stated that the car seats went to families across the province, including those in NDP-held ridings.

Following her re-election in 2009, she was named Deputy Speaker of the Legislative Assembly. She celebrated the 20th anniversary of her first election to the legislature on October 17, 2011; she was one of the longest serving MLAs in British Columbia and the only one to have served consecutive terms for over 20 years. She supported the Nelson Road Interchange project, which included the construction of ramps between Nelson Road and British Columbia Highway 91 in order to reduce the volume of heavy trucks on Westminster Highway; the project was completed in 2011.

She was chosen as Speaker of the Legislative Assembly after her re-election in 2013. She faced scrutiny in 2014 for spending $120,000 on various items, including upgrading the speaker's desk for $48,000, and for charging taxpayers for her husband's business class airfare to South Africa when he accompanied her to the Commonwealth Parliamentary Conference.

With the Richmond East riding dissolved ahead of the 2017 election, she ran in the newly established Richmond South Centre and was elected there. She returned to the cabinet that June as Minister of Advanced Education under Premier Christy Clark but only served until that July, following the Liberal minority government's defeat in a confidence vote on June 29. She then became Assistant Deputy Speaker of the Legislative Assembly in September 2017, serving until February 2019. In October 2019 she announced her decision not to contest the next provincial election; she is the province's longest-serving female MLA.

Reid has served on Treasury Board, and on the Select Standing Committee to Appoint a Child, Youth and Family Advocate, the Select Standing Committee to Appoint a Police Complaints Commissioner, the Select Standing Committee on Transportation, Municipal Affairs and Housing and the Select Standing Committee on Crown Corporations.

== Electoral record ==
2017 British Columbia general election: Richmond South Centre
Party	Candidate	Votes	%	Expenditures
Liberal	Linda Reid	6,914	48.72	$68,363
New Democratic	Chak Au	5,716	40.28	$71,475
Green	Greg Powell	1,561	11.00	$379
Total valid votes		14,191	100.00	–
Total rejected ballots		171	1.19	
Turnout		14,362	46.70	
Registered voters		30,753		
Source: Elections BC

2013 British Columbia general election: Richmond East
Party	Candidate	Votes	%	±%	Expenditures
Liberal	Linda Reid	11,592	54.68	-4.05	$113,202
New Democratic	Gian Sihota	6,047	28.52	-3.93	$18,837
Conservative	Nathaniel Lim	1,827	8.62	-	$4,529
Green	Doug Perry	1,178	5.56	-0.99	$388
Independent	Lloyd Chen	247	1.17	-	$250
Excalibur	Ping Chan	175	0.82	-	$2,417
Independent	Cliff Wei	133	0.63	-	$250
Total valid votes		21,199	100.00		
Total rejected ballots		233	1.09		
Turnout		21,432	47.58		
Source: Elections BC

== Personal life ==
Reid married her husband Sheldon Friesen in 1997; they have two children together.

Reid is a longtime supporter and member of the Girl Guides of Canada; she advocated for the creation of an endowment fund for the Guides to protect against changes in the property tax exemption status on Camp Olave, a Guiding camp property on British Columbia's Sunshine Coast.

In 2008, Reid was instrumental in the implementation of the Roots of Empathy program in BC. This program aims to reduce bullying by fostering empathy. Reid was the 2004–2005 chair of the Canada Northwest Fetal Alcohol Partnership, which aims to develop an inter provincial approach to preventing FASD.

In January 2012, Reid traveled to New Mexico for the opening of their 50th legislative session. Reid's trip to New Mexico stemmed from a friendship agreement between the legislative assemblies of British Columbia and New Mexico. This friendship agreement allows for exchanges of information and traditions between the two.

Reid is an avid supporter of Richmond's agricultural community. She frequents local farms and markets to purchase vegetables and fruits and encourages her constituents to do the same. Reid has advocated for better drainage in Richmond and for the Nelson Road Interchange project, both of which have had positive effects on the agricultural community.

On March 9, 2012, Reid was announced as the winner of the Ethel Tibbits Award in the category of community, in recognition of her two decades of work as a political and community leader. The awards, known as the Ethels, are run by the Richmond Review newspaper.

Reid continues to serve as an honorary co-chair of the Annual Women's Campaign School, which aims to get more women involved in the democratic process. Reid was the BC chair for the Canadian Guide Dogs for the Blind and a director of the Garden City Hospice Society. She has been active in the Richmond Chamber of Commerce, the Asia-Pacific Business Association, and the Canadian Council for Exceptional Children and the Family Court Committee of Richmond. She was a founding member of the Richmond Chinatown Lions Club and was chair of the British Columbia Youth Parliament board from 1986 to 1991. In 2012, the British Columbia Youth Parliament honoured Reid with the first ever award for Outstanding Leadership.

== Cabinet positions ==
British Columbia provincial government of Christy Clark
Cabinet post (1)
Predecessor	Office	Successor
Andrew Wilkinson	Minister of Advanced Education; June 12, 2017–July 18, 2017	Melanie Mark
British Columbia provincial government of Gordon Campbell
Cabinet post (1)
Predecessor	Office	Successor
Ministry Established	Minister of State for Childcare; June 5, 2001–June 10, 2009	Mary Polak
