= 16th Parliament of British Columbia =

The 16th Legislative Assembly of British Columbia sat from 1924 to 1928. The members were elected in the British Columbia general election held in June 1924. The British Columbia Liberal Party, led by John Oliver, formed a minority government. Following Oliver's death in August 1927, John Duncan MacLean became Premier.

John Andrew Buckham served as speaker for the assembly.

== Members of the 16th Parliament ==
The following members were elected to the assembly in 1924.:

Member	Electoral district	Party	First elected / previously elected	No.# of term(s)
Richard John Burde	Alberni	Independent Liberal	1919	3rd term
Herbert Frederick Kergin	Atlin	Liberal	1920	2nd term
Francis Aubrey Browne	Burnaby	Canadian Labour	1924	1st term
David Alexander Stoddart	Cariboo	Provincial	1890, (Note: Lillooet) 1895, (Note: Lillooet East) 1924	3rd term*
Edward Dodsley Barrow	Chilliwack	Liberal	1916	3rd term
John Andrew Buckham	Columbia	Liberal	1916	3rd term
Paul Phillips Harrison	Comox	Independent Liberal	1924	1st term
Paul Phillips Harrison	Comox	Liberal	1924	1st term
Cyril Francis Davie	Cowichan-Newcastle	Conservative	1924	1st term
Noel Stirling Austin Arnold Wallinger	Cranbrook	Conservative	1922	2nd term
Fred W. Lister	Creston	Conservative	1920	2nd term
Alexander McDonald Paterson	Delta	Liberal	1921	2nd term
John Alexander Catherwood	Dewdney	Conservative	1920	2nd term
Robert Henry Pooley	Esquimalt	Conservative	1912	4th term
Thomas Aubert Uphill	Fernie	Canadian Labour	1920	2nd term
Henry George Thomas Perry	Fort George	Liberal	1920	2nd term
John McKie	Grand Forks-Greenwood	Conservative	1924	1st term
Dougald McPherson (1925)	Grand Forks-Greenwood	Liberal	1925	1st term
Cyrus Wesley Peck	The Islands	Conservative	1924	1st term
James Reginald Colley	Kamloops	Liberal	1924	1st term
Charles Sidney Leary	Kaslo-Slocan	Liberal	1924	1st term
Albert Edward Munn	Lillooet	Liberal	1924	1st term
Michael Manson	Mackenzie	Conservative	1909, (Note: Comox) 1924	3rd term*
William Sloan	Nanaimo	Liberal	1916	3rd term
Kenneth Campbell	Nelson	Liberal	1922	2nd term
John Oliver (1924)	Nelson	Liberal	1900, (Note: Westminster-Delta) 1916, (Note: Dewdney) 1924	6th term*
James Albert McDonald (1927)	Nelson	Liberal	1927	1st term
Edwin James Rothwell	New Westminster	Liberal	1924	1st term
Arthur Wellesley Gray (1927)	New Westminster	Liberal	1927	1st term
Kenneth Cattanach MacDonald	North Okanagan	Liberal	1916	3rd term
Arthur Ormiston Cochrane (1924)	North Okanagan	Conservative	1924	1st term
William Farris Kennedy (1927)	North Okanagan	Liberal	1927	1st term
John Melvin Bryan Sr.	North Vancouver	Liberal	1924	1st term
Alexander Malcolm Manson	Omineca	Liberal	1916	3rd term
Thomas Dufferin Pattullo	Prince Rupert	Liberal	1916	3rd term
William Henry Sutherland	Revelstoke	Liberal	1916	3rd term
George Alexander Walkem	Richmond-Point Grey	Provincial	1924	1st term
George Alexander Walkem	Richmond-Point Grey	Conservative	1924	1st term
James Hargrave Schofield	Rossland-Trail	Conservative	1907	6th term
Thomas George Coventry	Saanich	Conservative	1924	1st term
Rolf Wallgren Bruhn	Salmon Arm	Conservative	1924	1st term
William Alexander McKenzie	Similkameen	Conservative	1920	2nd term
Horace Cooper Wrinch	Skeena	Liberal	1924	1st term
James William Jones	South Okanagan	Conservative	1916	3rd term
Robert Henry Neelands	South Vancouver	Canadian Labour	1920	2nd term
Andrew McCreight Creery	Vancouver City	Provincial	1924	1st term
Ian Alistair MacKenzie	Vancouver City	Liberal	1920	2nd term
Christopher McRae	Vancouver City	Liberal	1924	1st term
Victor Wentworth Odlum	Vancouver City	Liberal	1924	1st term
Mary Ellen Smith	Vancouver City	Liberal	1918	3rd term
Charles Woodward	Vancouver City	Liberal	1924	1st term
Reginald Hayward	Victoria City	Conservative	1924	1st term
Joshua Hinchcliffe	Victoria City	Conservative	1920	2nd term
Robert Allan Gus Lyons	Victoria City	Conservative	1924	1st term
Harold Despard Twigg	Victoria City	Conservative	1924	1st term
John Duncan MacLean	Yale	Liberal	1916	3rd term

== Party standings ==
Affiliation	Members
Liberal	23
Conservative	17
Provincial	3
Canadian Labour Party	3
Independent Liberal	2
Total	48
Government Majority	-2

== By-elections ==
By-elections were held for the following members appointed to the provincial cabinet, as was required at the time:

- Kenneth Cattanach MacDonald, defeated by Arthur Ormiston Cochrane, Conservative, October 9, 1924

By-elections were held to replace members for various other reasons:

Electoral district	Member elected	Party	Election date	Reason
Nelson	John Oliver	Liberal	August 23, 1924	K. Campbell resigned August 1924; provide seat for J. Oliver
Grand Forks-Greenwood	Dougald McPherson	Liberal	April 25, 1925	death of J. McKie October 29, 1924
North Okanagan	William Farris Kennedy	Conservative	June 9, 1927	death of A.O. Cochrane December 4, 1926
New Westminster	Arthur Wellesley Gray	Liberal	August 25, 1927	death of E.J. Rothwell June 29, 1927
Nelson	James Albert McDonald	Liberal	October 17, 1927	death of J. Oliver August 17, 1927

== Other changes ==
- Shortly after the election Paul Phillips Harrison joins the Liberals while Richard John Burde becomes an independent.
- George Alexander Walkem joins the Conservatives in 1928.
- Nanaimo (dec. William Sloan March 2, 1928)
- Vancouver City(res. Ian Alistair Mackenzie appointed Provincial Secretary June 5, 1928)
