= 17th Parliament of British Columbia =

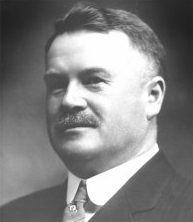
Simon Fraser Tolmie, leader of the 17th Parliament of British Columbia

The 17th Legislative Assembly of British Columbia sat from 1929 to 1933. The members were elected in the British Columbia general election held in June 1928. The Conservative Party, led by Simon Fraser Tolmie, formed the government.

James William Jones served as speaker for the assembly until his resignation in 1930. Jones was replaced by Cyril Francis Davie.

== Members of the 17th Parliament ==
The following members were elected to the assembly in 1928.:

| Member | Electoral district | Party | First elected / previously elected | No.# of term(s) |
|---|---|---|---|---|
| Laurence Arnold Hanna | Alberni | Liberal | 1928 | 1st term |
| Herbert Frederick Kergin | Atlin | Liberal | 1920 | 3rd term |
| William Robert Rutledge | Burnaby | Conservative | 1928 | 1st term |
| Roderick MacKenzie | Cariboo | Conservative | 1928 | 1st term |
| William Atkinson | Chilliwack | Conservative | 1928 | 1st term |
| John Andrew Buckham | Columbia | Liberal | 1916 | 4th term |
| Thomas King (1931) | Columbia | Liberal | 1931 | 1st term |
| George Kerr McNaughton | Comox | Conservative | 1928 | 1st term |
| Cyril Francis Davie | Cowichan-Newcastle | Conservative | 1924 | 2nd term |
| Frank Mitchell MacPherson | Cranbrook | Liberal | 1928 | 1st term |
| Fred W. Lister | Creston | Conservative | 1920 | 3rd term |
| John Walter Berry | Delta | Conservative | 1928 | 1st term |
| Nelson Seymour Lougheed | Dewdney | Conservative | 1928 | 1st term |
| Robert Henry Pooley | Esquimalt | Conservative | 1912 | 5th term |
| Thomas Aubert Uphill | Fernie | Independent Labour Party | 1920 | 3rd term |
| Frederick Parker Burden | Fort George | Conservative | 1928 | 1st term |
| Roy Walter Alward (1931) | Fort George | Conservative | 1931 | 1st term |
| Charles Morgan Kingston | Grand Forks-Greenwood | Conservative | 1928 | 1st term |
| Cyrus Wesley Peck | The Islands | Conservative | 1924 | 2nd term |
| MacGregor Fullerton MacIntosh (1931) | The Islands | Conservative | 1931 | 1st term |
| John Ralph Michell | Kamloops | Conservative | 1928 | 1st term |
| James Fitzsimmons | Kaslo-Slocan | Conservative | 1928 | 1st term |
| Ernest Crawford Carson | Lillooet | Conservative | 1928 | 1st term |
| Michael Manson | Mackenzie | Conservative | 1909, (Note: Comox) 1924 | 4th term* |
| George Sharratt Pearson | Nanaimo | Liberal | 1928 | 1st term |
| Lorris E. Borden | Nelson | Conservative | 1928 | 1st term |
| Arthur Wellesley Gray | New Westminster | Liberal | 1924 | 2nd term |
| William Farris Kennedy | North Okanagan | Conservative | 1927 | 2nd term |
| George Heggie (1930) | North Okanagan | Conservative | 1930 | 1st term |
| Ian Alistair MacKenzie | North Vancouver | Liberal | 1920 | 3rd term |
| Jack Loutet (1930) | North Vancouver | Conservative | 1930 | 1st term |
| Alexander Malcolm Manson | Omineca | Liberal | 1916 | 4th term |
| Thomas Dufferin Pattullo | Prince Rupert | Liberal | 1916 | 4th term |
| William Henry Sutherland | Revelstoke | Liberal | 1916 | 4th term |
| Samuel Lyness Howe | Richmond-Point Grey | Conservative | 1928 | 1st term |
| James Hargrave Schofield | Rossland-Trail | Conservative | 1907 | 7th term |
| Simon Fraser Tolmie | Saanich | Conservative | 1928 | 1st term |
| Rolf Wallgren Bruhn | Salmon Arm | Conservative | 1924 | 2nd term |
| William Alexander McKenzie | Similkameen | Conservative | 1920 | 3rd term |
| Horace Cooper Wrinch | Skeena | Liberal | 1924 | 2nd term |
| James William Jones | South Okanagan | Conservative | 1916 | 4th term |
| Jonathan Webster Cornett | South Vancouver | Conservative | 1928 | 1st term |
| William Dick | Vancouver City | Conservative | 1928 | 1st term |
| Thomas Henry Kirk | Vancouver City | Conservative | 1928 | 1st term |
| Royal Lethington Maitland | Vancouver City | Conservative | 1928 | 1st term |
| William Curtis Shelly | Vancouver City | Conservative | 1928 | 1st term |
| Nelson Spencer | Vancouver City | Conservative | 1928 | 1st term |
| George Alexander Walkem | Vancouver City | Conservative | 1924 (Note: First elected as Provincial) | 2nd term |
| James Harry Beatty | Victoria City | Conservative | 1928 | 1st term |
| Reginald Hayward | Victoria City | Conservative | 1924 | 2nd term |
| Joshua Hinchcliffe | Victoria City | Conservative | 1920 | 3rd term |
| Harold Despard Twigg | Victoria City | Conservative | 1924 | 2nd term |
| John Joseph Alban Gillis | Yale | Liberal | 1928 | 1st term |

== Party standings ==
| Affiliation | Members |
|---|---|
| Conservative | 35 |
| Liberal | 12 |
| Independent Labour | 1 |
| Total | 48 |
| Government Majority | 22 |

== By-elections ==
By-elections were held for the following members appointed to the provincial cabinet, as was required at the time. This requirement was abolished in 1929.

- William Atkinson, Minister of Agriculture, acclaimed October 22, 1928
- Nelson Seymour Lougheed, Minister of Public Works, acclaimed October 22, 1928
- Robert Henry Pooley, Attorney-General, acclaimed October 22, 1928
- Frederick Parker Burden, Minister of Lands, acclaimed October 22, 1928
- Samuel Lyness Howe, Provincial Secretary and Minister of Fisheries, acclaimed October 22, 1928
- Simon Fraser Tolmie, Premier, acclaimed October 22, 1928
- William Alexander McKenzie, Minister of Mines, acclaimed October 22, 1928
- William Curtis Shelly, Minister of Finance, acclaimed October 22, 1928
- Joshua Hinchcliffe, Minister of Education, acclaimed October 22, 1928

By-elections were held to replace members for various other reasons:

| Electoral district | Member elected | Party | Election date | Reason |
|---|---|---|---|---|
| North Okanagan | George Heggie | Conservative | July 2, 1930 (Note: Acclaimed) | W.F. Kennedy resigned May 19, 1930; named to Liquor Control Board |
| North Vancouver | Jack Loutet | Conservative | November 5, 1930 | I.A. MacKenzie resigned June 27, 1930; named to federal cabinet |
| Fort George | Roy Walter Alward | Conservative | January 7, 1931 | F.P. Burden resigned June 27, 1930; named Agent-General January 1, 1931 |
| The Islands | MacGregor Fullerton MacIntosh | Conservative | February 10, 1931 | C.W. Peck resigned January 3, 1931; named to Canada Pension Tribunal |
| Columbia | Thomas King | Liberal | December 19, 1931 | J.A. Buckham died October 12, 1931 |

== Other changes ==
- In 1932 the Independent Labour Party became the Socialist Party.Tom Uphill continues to sit as a Labour member.
- Mackenzie (dec. Michael Manson July 11, 1932)
