= 1924 British Columbia general election =

Canadian provincial election

← 1920	June 20, 1924	1928 →

48 seats to the 16th Legislative Assembly of British Columbia 25 seats were needed for a majority
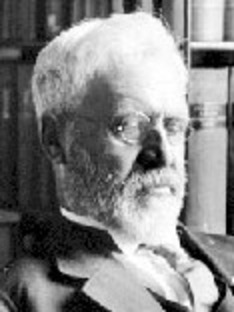

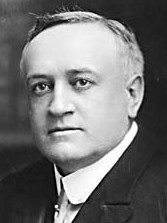

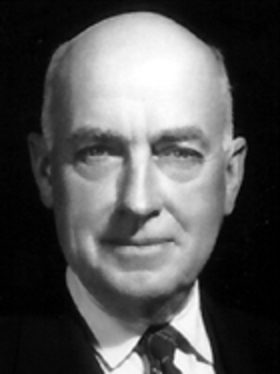
	First party	Second party	Third party
Leader	John Oliver	William John Bowser	Alexander Duncan McRae
Party	Liberal	Conservative	Provincial
Last election	25 seats, 37.89%	15 seats, 31.20%	Did not contest
Seats won	23	17	3
Seat change	▼2	▲2	▲3
Popular vote	108,323	101,765	83,517
Percentage	31.34%	29.45%	24.16%
Swing	▼6.55pp	▼1.75pp	Did not contest
	Fourth party	Fifth party
	CLP	IL
Party	Canadian Labour	Independent Liberal
Last election	Did not contest	0 seats, 0.97%
Seats won	3	2
Seat change	▲3	▲2
Popular vote	39,044	3,549
Percentage	11.30%	1.03%
Swing	Did not contest	▲0.06pp
Premier before election
John Oliver
Liberal
Premier after election
John Oliver
Liberal

The 1924 British Columbia general election was the sixteenth general election in the Canadian province of British Columbia. It was held to elect members of the Legislative Assembly of British Columbia. The election was called on May 10, 1924, and held on June 20, 1924. The new legislature met for the first time on November 3, 1924.

The Liberal Party was re-elected to its third term in government, falling just short of a majority in the legislature even though it won less than a third of the popular vote. Two Independent Liberals were also elected. Premier John Oliver lost his own seat in Victoria City, but remained Premier until 1927.

The Conservative Party formed the official opposition, while two new parties, the Provincial Party and the Canadian Labour Party won three seats each, and a total of 35% of the vote.

== 1923 redistribution of ridings ==
An Act was passed in 1923, providing for an increase in the seats in the Assembly from 47 to 48 upon the next election. The following changes were made:

Abolished ridings	New ridings
Drawn from other ridings
	Creston (Note: from part of Nelson)
	Mackenzie
	Salmon Arm
	Burnaby (Note: from part of New Westminster)
	Skeena
Merger of districts
Kaslo; Slocan	Kaslo-Slocan
Cowichan; Newcastle	Cowichan-Newcastle
Grand Forks; Greenwood	Grand Forks-Greenwood
Rossland; Trail	Rossland-Trail
Renaming of districts
Richmond	Richmond-Point Grey

== Campaign ==
The Provincial Party, which nominated candidates only in 1924, was formed by a group of British Columbia Conservative Party dissidents known as the "Committee of 100", led and funded by the wealthy General Alexander McRae and political elements from the United Farmers of British Columbia. McRae claimed that the Liberal government of John Oliver and the previous administrations of Conservative Premier William John Bowser, then the opposition leader, were corrupt. Many of his allegations were related to the funding of the Pacific Great Eastern Railway plan to reach Prince George in the Northern interior of the province, which was not achieved until many years later. He claimed that there were kickbacks, patronage and various wrongdoings. His allegations were never proven. The election was bitterly fought with sensational allegations against all three leaders. McRae was not elected. Both Bowser and Oliver lost their seats but Oliver continued to lead his Liberal Party as Premier of a minority government after the election.

In the single-member districts, there was only one two-way contest, and most were either two- or three-way battles:

Candidate contests in the ridings
Candidates nominated		Ridings	Party									
Candidates nominated		Ridings	Lib	Con	Prov	Lab	Ind-Lib	Ind	Soc	Ind-Con	Farm-Lab	Totals
Single-member districts	2	1	1	1								2
Single-member districts	3	26	24	25	24	1	2			1	1	78
Single-member districts	4	10	10	10	10	5	2		1	2		40
Single-member districts	5	1	1	1	1	1		1				5
Multiple-member districts	Vancouver (6 MLAs)	1	6	6	6	5	1	1	1	1		27
Multiple-member districts	Victoria (4 MLAs)	1	4	4	4	3		1				16
Total		40	46	47	45	15	5	3	2	4	1	168

== Aftermath ==
All three major party leaders had lost their races. In McRae's case, he missed becoming MLA in Vancouver City only because his fellow candidate Andrew McCreight Creery obtained 63 more votes. In an August byelection, Oliver gained a seat in Nelson when Kenneth Campbell chose to stand aside. Bowser decided to retire from politics, and Robert Henry Pooley (Esquimalt) was selected as the new Conservative leader.

The Provincial and Labour members would support critical portions of the Liberal legislative programme in the following session of the Legislature.

== Results ==
Elections to the 16th Legislative Assembly of British Columbia (1924)
Political party	Party leader	MLAs				Votes			
Political party	Party leader	Candidates	1920	1924	±	#	±	%	± (pp)
Liberal	John Oliver	46	25	23	2▼	108,323	25,844▼	31.34	6.55▼
Conservative	William Bowser	47	15	17	2▲	101,765	8,710▼	29.45	1.75▼
Provincial	Alexander Duncan McRae	45	–	3	3▲	83,517	83,517▲	24.16	New
Canadian Labour (Note: compared with 1920 results for its predecessor Federated Labour)		15	3	3	Steady	39,044	6,814▲	11.30	2.20▲
Independent Liberal		5	–	2	2▲	3,549	116▲	1.03	0.06▲
Independent		3	3	–	3▼	2,520	34,216▼	0.73	9.64▼
People's Party		–	1	–	1▼	Did not campaign			
Socialist		2	–	–	–	4,364	8,022▼	1.26	2.24▼
Independent Conservative		4	–	–	–	2,046	444▲	0.59	0.14▲
Farmer–Labour		1	–	–	–	478	478▲	0.14	New
Total		168	47	48		345,608		100.00%	

Seats and popular vote by party
Party	Seats	Votes	Change (pp)
█ Liberal	23 / 48	31.34%	-6.55
█ Conservative	17 / 48	29.45%	-1.75
█ Provincial	3 / 48	24.16%	24.16
█ Federated Labour/Canadian Labour	3 / 48	11.30%	2.20
█ Socialist	0 / 48	1.26%	-2.24
█ Independent	0 / 48	0.73%	-9.64
█ Soldier/GAUV	0 / 48	0.00%	-4.58
█ Other	2 / 48	1.76%	-1.60

== MLAs elected ==
Alberni: Richard John Burde (I-Lib)
Atlin: Herbert Frederick Kergin
Burnaby: Francis Aubrey Browne (CLP)
Cariboo: David Alexander Stoddart
Chilliwack: Edward Dodsley Barrow
Columbia: John Andrew Buckham
Comox: Paul Phillips Harrison (I-Lib)
Cowichan-Newcastle: Cyril Francis Davie
Cranbrook: Noel Wallinger
Creston: Fred W. Lister
Delta: Alexander McDonald Paterson
Dewdney: John Alexander Catherwood
Esquimalt: Robert Henry Pooley
Fernie: Thomas Aubert Uphill (CLP)
Fort George: Henry George Thomas Perry
Grand Forks-Greenwood: John McKie
The Islands: Cyrus Wesley Peck
Kamloops: James Reginald Colley
Kaslo-Slocan: Charles Sidney Leary
Lillooet: Albert Edward Munn
Mackenzie: Michael Manson
Nanaimo: William Sloan
Nelson: Kenneth Campbell
New Westminster: Edwin James Rothwell
North Okanagan: K. C. MacDonald
North Vancouver: John Melvin Bryan, Sr.
Omineca: Alexander Malcolm Manson
Prince Rupert: Duff Pattullo
Revelstoke: William Henry Sutherland
Richmond-Point Grey: George Alexander Walkem
Rossland-Trail: James Hargrave Schofield
Saanich: Thomas George Coventry
Salmon Arm: Rolf Wallgren Bruhn
Similkameen: William Alexander McKenzie
Skeena: Horace Cooper Wrinch
South Okanagan: James William Jones
South Vancouver: Robert Henry Neelands (CLP)
Vancouver City: Ian Alistair MacKenzie
Vancouver City: Christopher McRae
Vancouver City: Victor Odlum
Vancouver City: Mary Ellen Smith
Vancouver City: Charles Woodward
Vancouver City: Andrew McCreight Creery
Victoria City: Reginald Hayward
Victoria City: Joshua Hinchcliffe
Victoria City: Gus Lyons
Victoria City: Harold Despard Twigg
Yale: John Duncan MacLean

=== Synopsis of results ===
Results by riding - 1924 British Columbia general election (single-member districts)
Riding	Winning party						Votes							
Name	1920	Party	Votes	Share	Margin #	Margin %	Lib	Con	Prov	CLP	I-Lib	Ind	Oth	Total
Alberni	Ind	I-Lib	828	42.48%	46	2.35%	–	339	781	–	828	–	–	1,949
Atlin	Lib	Lib	463	38.71%	83	6.94%	463	353	380	–	–	–	–	1,196
Burnaby	New	CLP	1,567	31.22%	243	4.85%	1,324	974	1,155	–	1,567	–	–	5,020
Cariboo	Lib	Prov	493	37.81%	79	6.06%	414	397	493	–	–	–	–	1,304
Chilliwack	Lib	Lib	1,429	37.83%	148	3.91%	1,429	1,067	1,281	–	–	–	–	3,777
Columbia	Lib	Lib	644	56.84%	350	30.89%	644	294	195	–	–	–	–	1,133
Comox	PP	I-Lib	1,261	43.95%	446	15.54%	–	815	793	–	1,261	–	–	2,869
Cowichan-Newcastle	New	Con	1,246	31.26%	114	2.86%	738	1,246	870	1,132	–	–	–	3,986
Cranbrook	Lib	Con	1,326	55.53%	264	11.06%	1,062	1,326	–	–	–	–	–	2,388
Creston	New	Con	879	49.97%	396	22.51%	483	879	397	–	–	–	–	1,759
Delta	Lib	Lib	1,677	46.13%	424	11.66%	1,677	1,253	633	–	72	–	–	3,635
Dewdney	Con	Con	1,259	36.60%	13	0.38%	1,246	1,259	935	–	–	–	–	3,440
Esquimalt	Con	Con	1,280	46.36%	655	23.72%	625	1,280	515	–	–	–	341	2,761
Fernie	FLP	CLP	1,002	40.18%	151	6.06%	641	851	–	1,002	–	–	–	2,494
Fort George	Lib	Lib	1,080	46.67%	52	2.24%	1,080	1,028	206	–	–	–	–	2,314
Grand Forks-Greenwood	New	Con	750	43.53%	108	6.27%	642	750	331	–	–	–	–	1,723
The Islands	Lib	Con	583	34.17%	2	0.11%	542	583	581	–	–	–	–	1,706
Kamloops	Lib	Lib	1,212	41.38%	215	7.34%	1,212	997	720	–	–	–	–	2,929
Kaslo-Slocan	New	Lib	799	39.11%	199	9.74%	799	384	600	260	–	–	–	2,043
Lillooet	Con	Lib	626	42.56%	104	7.07%	626	323	522	–	–	–	–	1,471
Mackenzie	New	Con	742	41.45%	95	5.27%	647	742	401	–	–	–	–	1,790
Nanaimo	Lib	Lib	1,612	46.35%	529	15.21%	1,612	642	141	–	–	–	1,083	3,478
Nelson	Con	Lib	902	43.14%	191	9.14%	902	711	–	–	–	–	478	2,091
New Westminster	Lib	Lib	1,564	37.61%	254	6.10%	1,564	1,310	591	693	–	–	–	4,158
North Okanagan	Lib	Lib	1,362	33.20%	292	7.12%	1,362	907	1,070	–	–	–	764	4,103
North Vancouver	Ind	Lib	1,283	31.34%	120	2.93%	1,283	442	1,151	–	1,163	55	–	4,094
Omineca	Lib	Lib	592	44.08%	139	10.35%	592	298	453	–	–	–	–	1,343
Prince Rupert	Lib	Lib	920	55.89%	255	15.49%	920	–	61	–	–	–	665	1,646
Revelstoke	Lib	Lib	1,099	59.05%	505	27.13%	1,099	594	168	–	–	–	–	1,861
Richmond-Point Grey	Con	Prov	2,141	35.34%	78	1.29%	1,855	2,063	2,141	–	–	–	–	6,059
Rossland-Trail	New	Con	938	48.88%	393	20.48%	545	938	436	–	–	–	–	1,919
Saanich	Lib	Con	1,433	47.43%	521	17.24%	912	1,433	676	–	–	–	–	3,021
Salmon Arm	New	Con	920	36.83%	96	3.84%	754	920	824	–	–	–	–	2,498
Similkameen	Con	Con	1,306	39.56%	82	2.48%	771	1,306	1,224	–	–	–	–	3,301
Skeena	New	Lib	794	50.41%	259	16.44%	794	246	535	–	–	–	–	1,575
South Okanagan	Con	Con	2,009	52.98%	691	18.22%	1,318	2,009	340	125	–	–	–	3,792
South Vancouver	FLP	CLP	1,971	38.74%	687	13.50%	1,141	1,284	692	1,971	–	–	–	5,088
Yale	Con	Lib	1,148	46.09%	383	15.38%	1,148	765	578	–	–	–	–	2,491

= open seat
= turnout is above provincial average
= winning candidate was in previous Legislature
= incumbent had switched allegiance
= previously incumbent in another riding
= not incumbent; was previously elected to the Legislature
= incumbency arose from byelection gain
= other incumbents renominated
= endorsed by Provincial Party
= endorsed by Conservative Party
= previously an MP in the House of Commons of Canada
= multiple candidates

Results by riding - 1924 British Columbia general election (multiple-member districts)
Party	Vancouver City			Victoria City		
Party	Votes	Share	Change	Votes	Share	Change
Liberal	58,261	30.71%	-8.26%	15,195	29.40%	-7.55%
Provincial	51,596	27.19%	New	9,050	17.51%	New
Conservative	45,685	24.08%	-5.88%	23,075	44.65%	11.86%
Canadian Labour	29,654	15.63%	4.69%	2,640	5.11%	2.86%
Socialist	3,281	1.73%	-4.06%	–	–	–
Independent	750	0.40%	-7.58%	1,715	3.32%	-5.00%
Independent Conservative	276	0.15%	New	–	–	–
Independent Liberal	225	0.12%	New	–	–	-3.79%
Grand Army of United Veterans	–	–	-2.69%	–	–	–
Women's Freedom League	–	–	-2.06%	–	–	–
Vancouver Ratepayers Association	–	–	-1.63%	–	–	–
Soldier–Labour	–	–	–	–	–	-9.88%
Liberty League of BC	–	–	–	–	–	4.57%
Independent Soldier	–	–	–	–	–	-1.44%
Total	189,728	100.00%		51,675	100.00%	
Seats won	5 1			4		
Incumbents returned	2			1		

== See also ==
- List of British Columbia political parties
