= 1928 British Columbia general election =

Canadian provincial election

- July 18, 1928

48 seats to the 17th Legislative Assembly of British Columbia 25 seats were needed for a majority
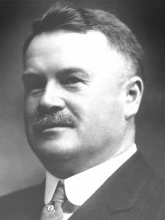

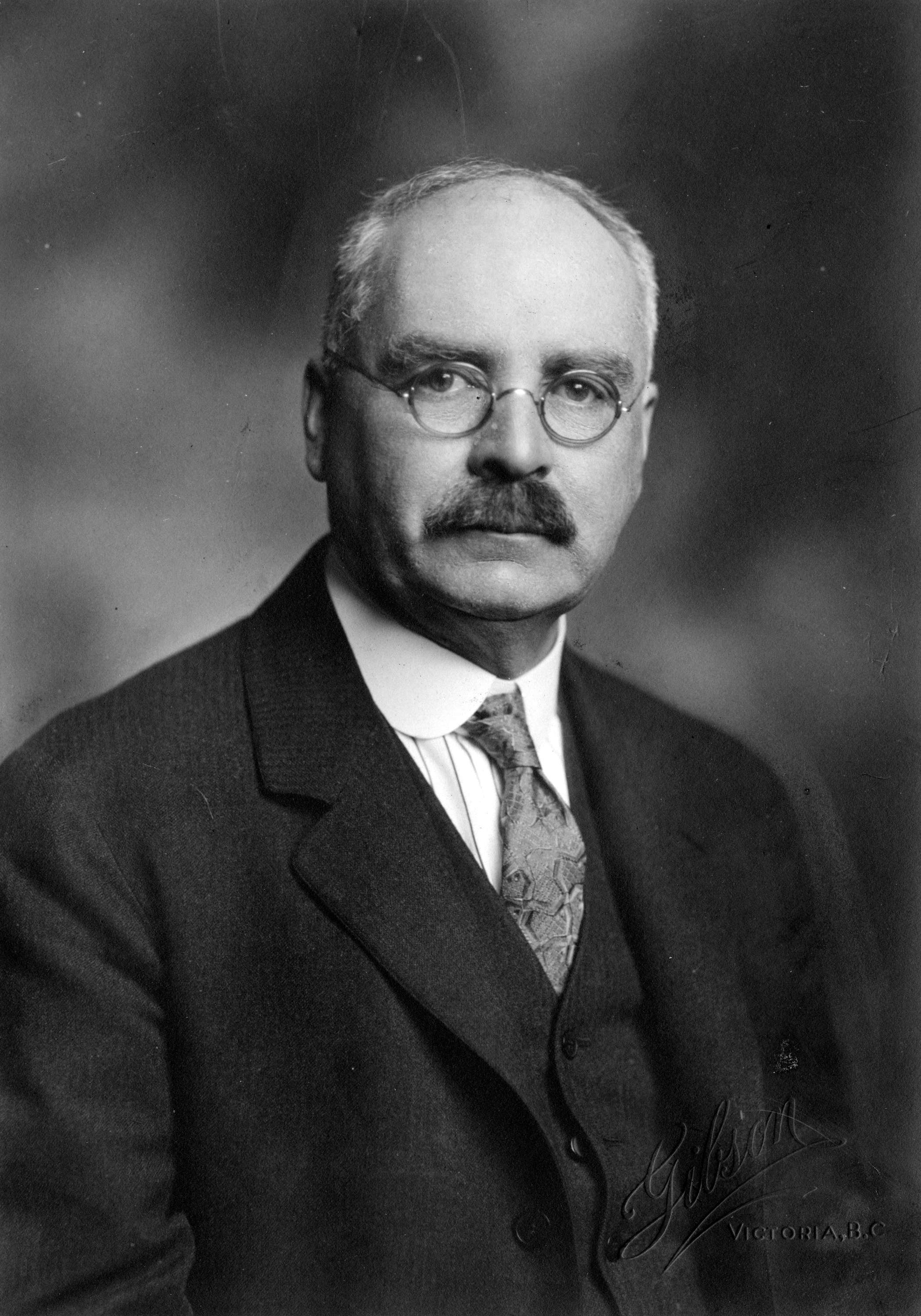
	First party	Second party	Third party
			ILP
Leader	Simon Fraser Tolmie	John Duncan MacLean
Party	Conservative	Liberal	Independent Labour
Leader's seat	Saanich (Note: Not the incumbent, but stood in this seat and won)	Victoria City
Last election	17 seats, 29.45%	23 seats, 31.34%	Did not contest
Seats won	35	12	1
Seat change	▲18	▼11	▲1
Popular vote	192,867	144,872	17,908
Percentage	53.30%	40.04%	4.95%
Swing	▲23.85pp	▲8.70pp	Did not contest
Premier before election
John Duncan MacLean
Liberal
Premier after election
Simon Fraser Tolmie
Conservative

The 1928 British Columbia general election was the seventeenth general election in the Province of British Columbia, Canada. It was held to elect members of the Legislative Assembly of British Columbia. The election was called on June 7, 1928, and held on July 18, 1928. The new legislature met for the first time on January 22, 1929.

The Conservative Party defeated the governing Liberal Party, taking over half the popular vote, and 35 of the 48 seats in the legislature. The Liberals' popular vote also increased significantly, but because of the disappearance of the Provincial Party and the Canadian Labour Party, which had won over 35% of the vote together in the previous election, the Liberals were defeated.

This was the last time that the Conservatives won a British Columbia general election outright until 2026.

== Results ==
Elections to the 17th Legislative Assembly of British Columbia (1928)
Political party	Party leader	MLAs				Votes			
Political party	Party leader	Candidates	1924	1928	±	#	±	%	± (pp)
Conservative	Simon Fraser Tolmie	48	17	35	18▲	192,867	91,102▲	53.30	23.85▲
Liberal	John Duncan MacLean	45	23	12	11▼	144,872	36,549▲	40.04	8.70▲
Independent Labour (Note: Compared with 1920 results for its predecessor Canadian Labour)		10	3	1	2▼	18,224	20,820▼	5.04	6.26▼
Provincial		–	3	–	3▼	–	83,517▼	–	24.16▼
Independent Liberal		2	2	–	2▼	1,001	2,548▼	0.28	0.75▼
Independent		9	–	–	–	3,658	1,138▲	1.01	0.28▲
Independent Conservative		2	–	–	–	1,064	982▼	0.29	0.30▼
Independent Farmer		1	–	–	–	128	128 ▲	0.04	New
Total		117	48	48		361,814		100.00%	
Rejected ballots						3,259			
Actual voters who voted						174,934		71.33%	
Registered voters						245,240			

Seats and popular vote by party
Party	Seats	Votes	Change (pp)
█ Conservative	35 / 48	53.30%	23.85
█ Liberal	12 / 48	40.04%	8.70
█ Independent Labour/Canadian Labour	1 / 48	5.04%	-6.26
█ Provincial	0 / 48	0%	-24.16
█ Socialist	0 / 48	0%	-1.26
█ Other	0 / 48	1.62%	-0.87

== MLAs elected ==
Alberni: Laurence Arnold Hanna
Atlin: Herbert Frederick Kergin
Burnaby: William Robert Rutledge
Cariboo: Roderick MacKenzie
Chilliwack: William Atkinson
Columbia: John Andrew Buckham
Comox: George Kerr McNaughton
Cowichan-Newcastle: Cyril Francis Davie
Cranbrook: Frank Mitchell MacPherson
Creston: Fred W. Lister
Delta: John Walter Berry
Dewdney: Nelson Seymour Lougheed
Esquimalt: Robert Henry Pooley
Fernie: Thomas Aubert Uphill (ILP)
Fort George: Frederick Parker Burden
Grand Forks-Greenwood: Charles Morgan Kingston
The Islands: Cyrus Wesley Peck
Kamloops: John Ralph Michell
Kaslo-Slocan: James Fitzsimmons
Lillooet: Ernest Crawford Carson
Mackenzie: Michael Manson
Nanaimo: William Sloan
Nelson: Lorris E. Borden
New Westminster: Wells Gray
North Okanagan: William Farris Kennedy
North Vancouver: Ian Alistair MacKenzie
Omineca: Alexander Malcolm Manson
Prince Rupert: Duff Pattullo
Revelstoke: William Henry Sutherland
Richmond-Point Grey: Samuel Lyness Howe
Rossland-Trail: James Hargrave Schofield
Saanich: Simon Fraser Tolmie
Salmon Arm: Rolf Wallgren Bruhn
Similkameen: William Alexander McKenzie
Skeena: Horace Cooper Wrinch
South Okanagan: James William Jones
South Vancouver: Jonathan Webster Cornett
Vancouver City: William Dick
Vancouver City: Thomas Henry Kirk
Vancouver City: Royal Maitland
Vancouver City: William Curtis Shelly
Vancouver City: Nelson Spencer
Vancouver City: George Alexander Walkem
Victoria City: James Harry Beatty
Victoria City: Reginald Hayward
Victoria City: Joshua Hinchcliffe
Victoria City: Harold Despard Twigg
Yale: John Joseph Alban Gillis

=== Synopsis of results ===
Results by riding – 1928 British Columbia general election (single-member districts)
Riding	Winning party						Votes					
Name	1924	Party	Votes	Share	Margin #	Margin %	Con	Lib	ILP	Ind	Oth	Total
Alberni	I-Lib	Lib	1,208	48.71%	186	7.50%	1,022	1,208	250	–	–	2,480
Atlin	Lib	Lib	587	50.56%	45	3.88%	542	587	–	32	–	1,161
Burnaby	CLP	Con	2,144	40.81%	365	6.94%	2,144	1,779	1,330	–	–	5,253
Cariboo	Prov	Con	623	44.00%	223	15.75%	623	400	–	393	–	1,416
Chilliwack	Lib	Con	2,595	55.51%	515	11.02%	2,595	2,080	–	–	–	4,675
Columbia	Lib	Lib	659	50.23%	32	2.44%	627	659	–	26	–	1,312
Comox	I-Lib	Con	2,058	53.85%	561	14.68%	2,058	1,497	267	–	–	3,822
Cowichan-Newcastle	Con	Con	2,360	58.17%	753	18.56%	2,360	–	1,607	90	–	4,057
Cranbrook	Con	Lib	1,833	52.46%	172	4.92%	1,661	1,833	–	–	–	3,494
Creston	Con	Con	1,184	54.76%	206	9.52%	1,184	978	–	–	–	2,162
Delta	Lib	Con	2,562	55.73%	527	11.46%	2,562	2,035	–	–	–	4,597
Dewdney	Con	Con	2,751	58.57%	805	17.14%	2,751	1,946	–	–	–	4,697
Esquimalt	Con	Con	1,806	62.10%	729	25.06%	1,806	1,077	–	–	25	2,908
Fernie	CLP	ILP	1,639	59.80%	537	19.60%	1,102	–	1,639	–	–	2,741
Fort George	Lib	Con	1,487	51.61%	93	3.22%	1,487	1,394	–	–	–	2,881
Grand Forks-Greenwood	Con	Con	888	52.92%	98	5.84%	888	790	–	–	–	1,678
The Islands	Con	Con	1,148	62.70%	465	25.40%	1,148	683	–	–	–	1,831
Kamloops	Lib	Con	1,531	50.25%	15	0.50%	1,531	1,516	–	–	–	3,047
Kaslo-Slocan	Lib	Con	1,169	51.23%	56	2.46%	1,169	1,113	–	–	–	2,282
Lillooet	Lib	Con	1,237	54.61%	209	9.22%	1,237	1,028	–	–	–	2,265
Mackenzie	Con	Con	1,266	51.03%	51	2.06%	1,266	1,215	–	–	–	2,481
Nanaimo	Lib	Lib	1,366	40.67%	65	1.94%	1,301	1,366	585	107	–	3,359
Nelson	Lib	Con	1,338	53.07%	155	6.14%	1,338	1,183	–	–	–	2,521
New Westminster	Lib	Lib	3,262	56.16%	716	12.32%	2,546	3,262	–	–	–	5,808
North Okanagan	Lib	Con	2,361	54.03%	480	10.99%	2,361	1,881	–	–	128	4,370
North Vancouver	Lib	Lib	2,498	46.60%	32	0.60%	2,466	2,498	–	397	–	5,361
Omineca	Lib	Lib	889	57.21%	224	14.42%	665	889	–	–	–	1,554
Prince Rupert	Lib	Lib	1,370	51.78%	94	3.56%	1,276	1,370	–	–	–	2,646
Revelstoke	Lib	Lib	1,170	56.36%	264	12.72%	906	1,170	–	–	–	2,076
Richmond-Point Grey	Prov	Con	5,414	62.16%	2,118	24.32%	5,414	3,296	–	–	–	8,710
Rossland-Trail	Con	Con	1,686	58.12%	471	16.24%	1,686	1,215	–	–	–	2,901
Saanich	Con	Con	2,379	56.44%	543	12.88%	2,379	1,836	–	–	–	4,215
Salmon Arm	Con	Con	1,706	73.25%	1,083	46.50%	1,706	623	–	–	–	2,329
Similkameen	Con	Con	2,079	55.53%	414	11.06%	2,079	1,665	–	–	–	3,744
Skeena	Lib	Lib	910	54.33%	145	8.66%	765	910	–	–	–	1,675
South Okanagan	Con	Con	2,145	56.08%	465	12.16%	2,145	–	–	1,680	–	3,825
South Vancouver	CLP	Con	2,452	47.45%	471	9.12%	2,452	696	1,981	39	–	5,168
Yale	Lib	Lib	1,514	57.22%	382	14.44%	1,132	1,514	–	–	–	2,646

= open seat
= turnout is above provincial average
= winning candidate was in previous Legislature
= incumbent had switched allegiance
= previously incumbent in another riding
= not incumbent; was previously elected to the Legislature
= incumbency arose from byelection gain
= other incumbents renominated
= previously an MP in the House of Commons of Canada
= multiple candidates

Results by riding – 1928 British Columbia general election (multiple-member districts)
Party	Vancouver City			Victoria City		
Party	Votes	Share	Change	Votes	Share	Change
Conservative	98,382	54.59%	30.51%	30,105	52.40%	7.74%
Liberal	70,602	39.18%	8.47%	25,078	43.65%	14.24%
Independent Labour	10,249	5.69%	-9.94%	316	0.55	-4.56%
Independent Liberal	976	0.54%	0.42%	–	–	–
Independent Conservative	–	–	-0.15%	1,064	1.85%	1.85%
Independent	–	–	-0.40%	894	1.56%	-1.76%
Provincial	–	–	-27.19%	–	–	-17.51%
Socialist	–	–	-1.73%	–	–	–
Total	180,209	100.00%		57,457	100.00%	
Seats won	6			4		
Incumbents returned	–			3		

== See also ==
- List of British Columbia political parties
