= Haggen =

Haggen may refer to:

== Surname ==
- Lois Haggen (1899-1994), Canada politician in British Columbia
- Rupert Haggen (1887-1962), Canadian politician in British Columbia
- Ben Haggen and Dorothy Haggen, founders of the Haggen chain of grocery stores

== Places ==
- Haggen (Sigmarszell), area in Sigmarszell, Bavaria, Germany
- Haggen (St. Gallen), area of St. Gallen, Switzerland
- St. Gallen Haggen railway station

== Other ==
- Haggen (supermarket), grocery store chain in the U.S. state of Washington
