= James Albert McDonald =

Canadian politician

Member of the Legislative Assembly of British Columbia
- In office 1927–1928
- Preceded by: John Oliver
- Succeeded by: Lorris E. Borden
- Constituency: Nelson

Personal details
- Born: April 3, 1870 Dalhousie, New Brunswick
- Died: March 30, 1957 (aged 86) Nelson, British Columbia
- Party: British Columbia Liberal Party
- Spouse: Edith Jane Anthony
- Occupation: businessman

James Albert "Long Jim" McDonald (April 3, 1870 – March 20, 1957) was a Canadian politician. He served in the Legislative Assembly of British Columbia from 1927 to 1928 from the electoral district of Nelson, a member of the Liberal party. He also served as Mayor of Nelson where he ran a fruit jam factory.
