= Arthur Cochrane =

Arthur Cochrane may refer to:

- Sir Arthur Cochrane (Royal Navy officer) (1824–1905), British admiral
- Sir Arthur Cochrane (officer of arms) (1872–1954), British officer of arms
- Arthur Ormiston Cochrane (1879–1926), Canadian politician
