= George Walkem =

George Walkem may refer to:

- George Anthony Walkem (1834–1908), British Columbian politician and jurist
- George Alexander Walkem (1872–1946), mechanical engineer, businessman and political figure in British Columbia
