= Thomas Love =

Thomas Love may refer to:

- Thomas C. Love (1789–1853), U.S. Representative from New York
- Thomas Alfred Love (1883–1955), Canadian politician
- Thomas George Love (1793–1845), British agent and bookkeeper
- Thomas Love (Tennessee politician), former Speaker of the Tennessee Senate and Lieutenant Governor of Tennessee
- Tom Love (born 1937), American billionaire businessman
