= Results of the 1921 Canadian federal election =

1921 Canadian federal election

== Results by Province and Territory ==
=== Alberta ===
Results in Alberta
Party	Seats	Second	Third	Fourth	Votes	%	+/-
Progressive	8				68,540	39.64	
Conservative		7	5		35,181	20.35	
Liberals		4	4	2	27,404	15.85	
United Farmers of Alberta	2				22,251	12.87	
Labour	2	1	2		19,159	11.08	
Unknown			1		369	0.21	
Total	12				172,904	100.0	

=== British Columbia ===
Results in British Columbia
Party	Seats	Second	Third	Fourth	Fifth	Votes	%	+/-
Conservative	7	6				74,225	47.89	
Liberals	3	6	2			46,249	29.84	
Progressive	3		1	1	1	18,087	11.67	
Labour		1	2			10,484	6.76	
Independent			2	1		5,375	3.47	
United Farmers of British Columbia			1			579	0.37	
Total	13					154,999	100.0	

=== Manitoba ===
Results in Manitoba
Party	Seats	Second	Third	Fourth	Fifth	Votes	%	+/-
Progressive	11					72,389	41.9	
Conservative		10	3			42,218	24.44	
Liberals	3	2	5		1	32,575	18.86	
Independent		2	2	1	1	12,723	7.36	
Labour	1			2		9,764	5.65	
Socialist		1				3,094	1.79	
Total	15					172,763	100.0	

=== New Brunswick ===
Results in New Brunswick
Party	Seats	Second	Third	Fourth	Fifth	Votes	%	+/-
Liberals	5	4	1			76,733	49.39	
Conservative	5	5				61,172	39.38	
Progressive	1	1	1		1	13,560	8.73	
Independent			1			2,663	1.71	
Labour				1		1,224	0.79	
Total	11					155,352	100.0	

=== Nova Scotia ===
Results in Nova Scotia
Party	Seats	Second	Third	Fourth	Fifth	Votes	%	+/-
Liberals	16					136,064	52.37	
Conservative		11	1	1	1	83,928	32.31	
Progressive		2	4			26,566	10.23	
Labour			1	1	1	9,175	3.53	
Unknown		1				4,060	1.56	
Total	16					259,793	100.0	

=== Ontario ===
Results in Ontario
Party	Seats	Second	Third	Fourth	Fifth	Votes	%	+/-
Conservative	36	32	10			435,050	38.32	
Liberals	21	21	21	1	1	341,233	30.05	
Progressive	20	24	20	2	1	290,478	25.58	
Labour		2	6	1		26,513	2.34	
Independent	2	1	2	3		21,790	1.92	
Independent Conservative	1					10,368	0.91	
United Farmers of Ontario	1					3,919	0.35	
Independent Progressive	1					3,309	0.29	
Independent Liberal		1				2,764	0.24	
Total	82					1,135,424	100.0	

=== Prince Edward Island ===
Results in Prince Edward Island
Party	Seats	Second	Third	Fourth	Fifth	Votes	%	+/-
Liberals	4					23,950	45.67	
Conservative		3	1			19,504	37.19	
Progressive			2		1	6,453	12.3	
Labour				1		2,537	4.84	
Total	4					52,444	100.0	

=== Quebec ===
Results in Quebec
Party	Seats	Second	Third	Fourth	Fifth	Votes	%	+/-
Liberals	65	1				562,889	70.81	
Conservative		40	5	1		147,075	18.5	
Independent		11	11	2	1	47,499	5.97	
Progressive		9	6			24,717	3.11	
Labour		1	2			5,860	0.74	
Unknown		2	1	1		4,945	0.62	
Independent Conservative		1				1,991	0.25	
Total	65					794,976	100.0	

=== Saskatchewan ===
Results in Saskatchewan
Party	Seats	Second	Third	Fourth	Votes	%	+/-
Progressive	15		2		138,186	61.73	
Liberals	1	9			41,852	18.7	
Conservative		6	6	1	36,591	16.35	
Unknown		1	1		5,340	2.39	
Labour			1		1,896	0.85	
Total	16				223,865	100.0	

=== Yukon ===
Results in Yukon
Party	Seats	Second	Third	Votes	%	+/-
Conservative	1			707	51.12	
Liberals		1		658	47.58	
Independent			1	18	1.3	
Total	1			1,383	100.0	
