= James Fitzsimmons =

James Fitzsimmons may refer to:

- Jim Fitzsimmons (footballer) (1884-1915), English footballer, see List of Bury F.C. players (1–24 appearances)
- James E. Fitzsimmons (1874–1966), Thoroughbred racehorse trainer
- James Fitzsimmons (politician) (1870–1948), member of the Legislative Assembly of British Columbia

== See also ==
- Jim Fitzsimons (born 1936), Irish politician
