= Edward Barrow =

Edward Barrow may refer to:

- Ed Barrow (1868–1953), American baseball executive
- Edward Dodsley Barrow (1867–1956), Canadian politician
