= 1921 Canadian federal election =

- December 6, 1921

235 seats in the House of Commons 118 seats needed for a majority
- Turnout: 67.7% (▼7.3 pp)
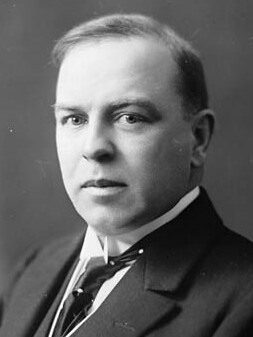

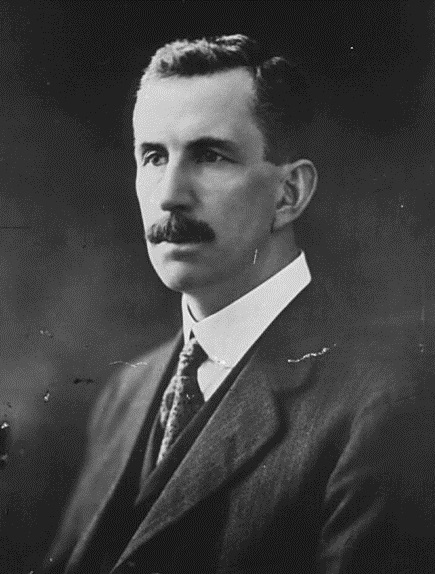

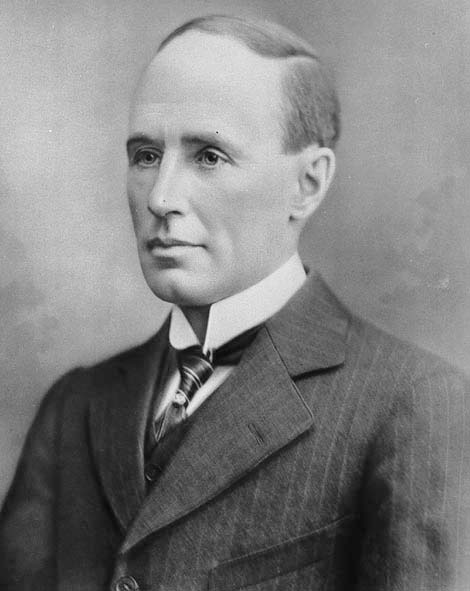

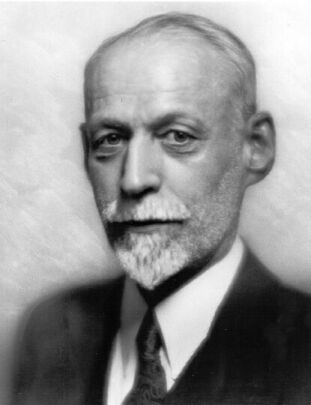

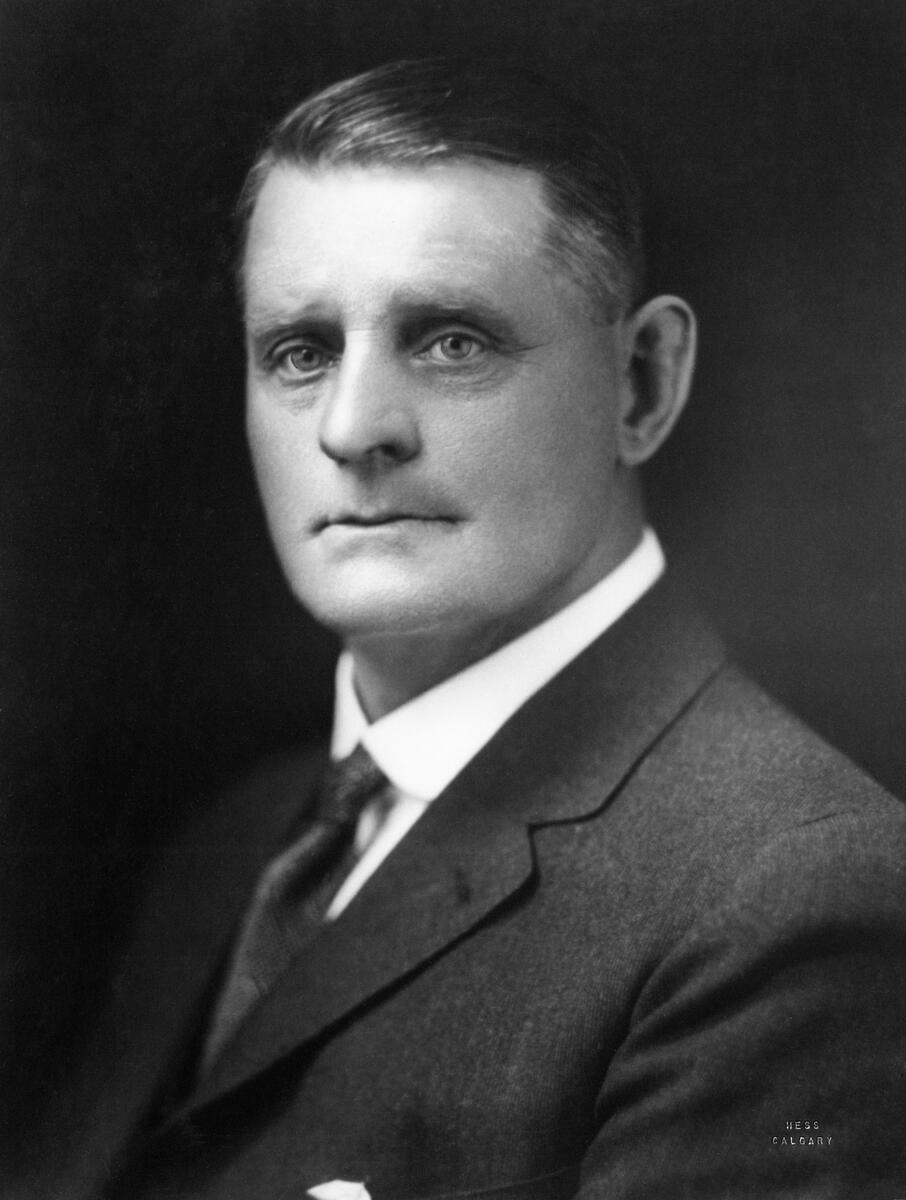

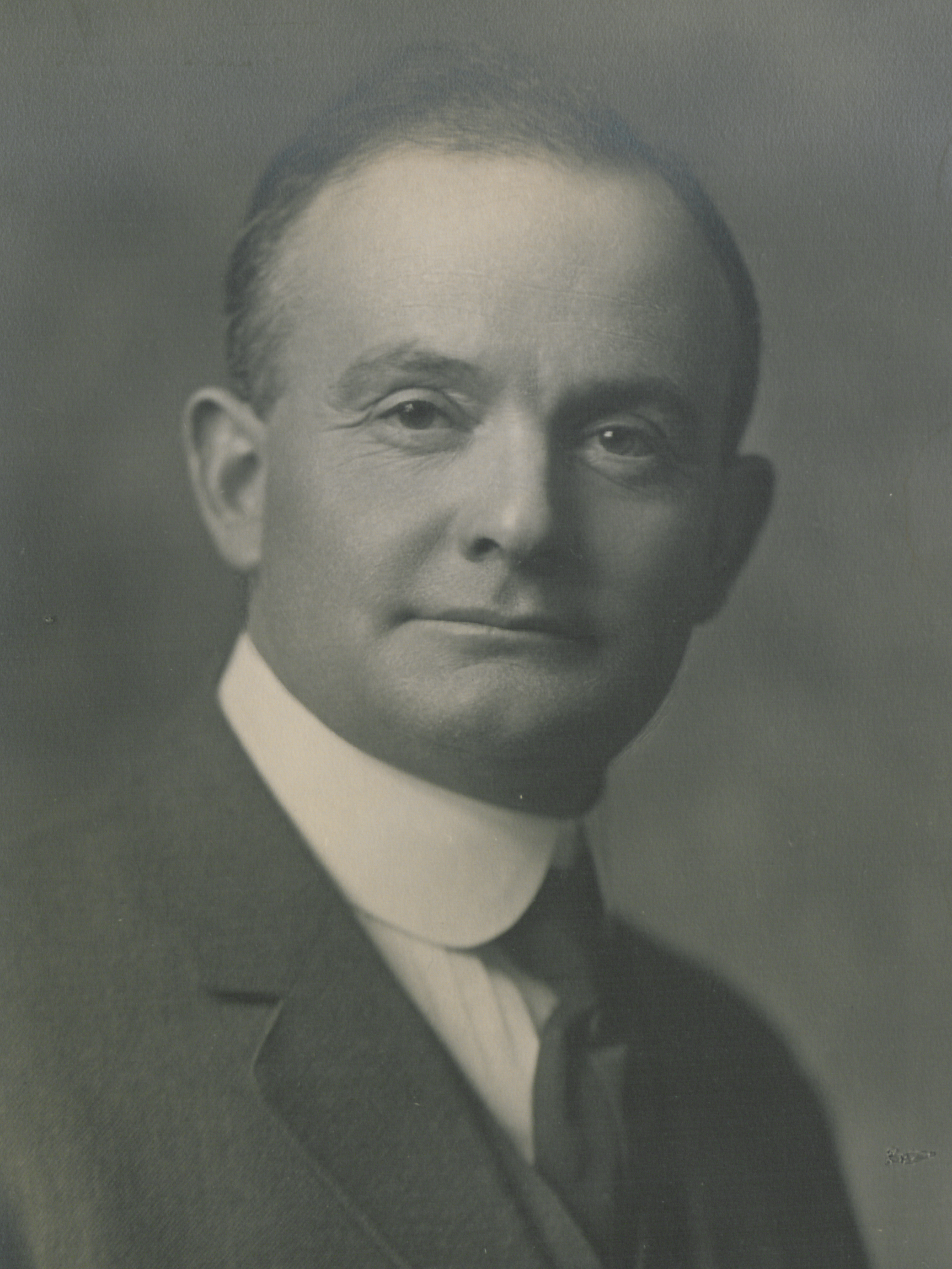
	First party	Second party	Third party
Leader	W. L. Mackenzie King	Thomas Crerar	Arthur Meighen
Party	Liberal	Progressive	Conservative
Leader since	August 7, 1919	February 26, 1920	July 10, 1920
Leader's seat	Prince candidate in York North	Marquette	Portage la Prairie (lost re-election)
Last election	82 seats, 38.80%	New party	153 seats, 56.93%
Seats won	118	58	49
Seat change	▲36	▲58	▼104
Popular vote	1,285,998	658,976	935,651
Percentage	41.15%	21.09%	29.95%
Swing	▲2.34 pp	New party	▼26.98 pp
	Fourth party	Fifth party	Sixth party
Leader	J. S. Woodsworth	Herbert Greenfield	Ernest C. Drury
Party	Labour	United Farmers of Alberta	United Farmers of Ontario
Leader since	December 6, 1921	August 13, 1921	November 14, 1919
Leader's seat	Winnipeg Centre	Did not run (Note: The United Farmers of Alberta, which at the time formed the government in that province, did not have a separate party leader at the federal level. At the time of this election, party leader Herbert Greenfield was the Premier of Alberta and the MLA for Peace River in the Legislative Assembly of Alberta.)	Did not run (Note: The United Farmers of Ontario, which at the time formed the government in that province, did not have a separate party leader at the federal level. At the time of this election, party leader Ernest C. Drury was the Premier of Ontario and the MLA for Halton in the Legislative Assembly of Ontario.)
Last election	0 seats, 1.84%	New party	New party
Seats won	3	2	1
Seat change	▲3	▲2	▲1
Popular vote	85,388	22,251	3,919
Percentage	2.73%	0.71%	0.13%
Swing	▲0.90 pp	New party	New party

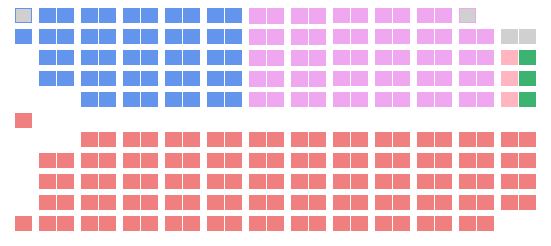
- The Canadian parliament after the 1921 election
Prime Minister before election
Arthur Meighen
Conservative
Prime Minister after election
William Lyon Mackenzie King
Liberal

The 1921 Canadian federal election was held on December 6, 1921, to elect members of the House of Commons of Canada of the 14th Parliament of Canada. The Union government that had governed Canada through the First World War was defeated, and replaced by a Liberal government under the young leader William Lyon Mackenzie King. A new party, the Progressive Party, won the second most seats in the election.

== Background ==
Since the 1911 election, the country had been governed by the Conservatives, first under the leadership of Prime Minister Robert Borden and then under Prime Minister Arthur Meighen. During the First World War, the Conservatives had united with the pro-conscription Liberal-Unionists and formed a Union government. A number of Members of Parliament (MPs), mostly Quebecers, stayed loyal to Wilfrid Laurier (popularly known as the Laurier Liberals), however, and they maintained their independence. When Laurier died, he was succeeded as leader by Mackenzie King.

After the 1919 federal budget, a number of western Unionist MPs left the Union government in protest against high tariffs on farm products imposed by the budget. Led by Thomas Alexander Crerar, the group became known as the Progressive Party. Also running were a number of Labour advocates, foremost amongst them J. S. Woodsworth of Winnipeg, who had organized their political movement after the Winnipeg general strike of 1919. Meighen had played a key role in violently suppressing the strikers and this earned him the animosity of organized labour.

Meighen attempted to make the "Unionist" party a permanent alliance of Tories and Liberals by renaming it the National Liberal and Conservative Party, but the effort failed, and most Unionist Liberals either returned to the Liberal fold or joined the new Progressive Party. Besides the labour strife and farm tariffs in the Prairie provinces, the Conscription Crisis of 1917 had a lasting effect on Tory fortunes by making the party virtually unelectable in Quebec. The Unionist government's broken promise not to conscript workers needed on western Canadian farms also lost it support on the prairies.

=== Electoral system ===
Most of the MPs were elected in single-winner First past the post; Ottawa and Halifax were two-seat ridings with each voter able to cast up to two votes as per Plurality block voting.

== National results ==

Party	Party leader	# of candidates	Seats			Popular vote		
Party	Party leader	# of candidates	1917	Elected	% Change	#	%	pp Change
Liberal	W. L. Mackenzie King	204	82	118	+43.9%	1,285,998	41.15%	+2.34
Conservative	Arthur Meighen	204	153	49	-68.0%	935,651	29.95%	-26.98
Progressive	T. A. Crerar	129	*	50	*	658,976	21.09%	*
Labour	J. S. Woodsworth	28	-	3		85,388	2.73%	+0.90
Independent		45	-	2		94,901	3.04%	+2.40
United Farmers of Alberta		10	*	10*	*	22,251	0.71%	*
Unknown		8	-	-	-	14,714	0.47%	+0.27
Independent Conservative		2	*	1	*	12,359	0.40%	*
United Farmers of Ontario		1	*	1	*	3,919	0.13%	*
Independent Progressive		1	*	1	*	3,309	0.115%	*
Socialist		1	*	-	*	3,094	0.10%	*
Independent Liberal		1	-	-	-	2,764	0.09%	-0.32
United Farmers of British Columbia		1	-	-	-	579	-	
Total		635	235	235	-	3,123,903	100%	
Sources: http://www.elections.ca -- History of Federal Ridings since 1867

Note:

* not applicable - the party was not recognized in the previous election

* UFA candidates were sometimes referred to as Progressives, just as sometimes "Progressive" candidates running outside Alberta were referred to as UFA. All farmer/Progressive candidates running in Alberta were both UFA and Progressive, and sat as such in the House of Commons, at least until the UFA caucus became more independent. The vote shares of Progressive and UFA candidates shown above, if combined, are accurate for the two parties together as one.)

== Vote and seat summaries ==
Popular vote
Liberal	41.15%
Conservative	29.95%
Progressive	21.09%
Others	7.81%

Seat totals
Liberal	50.21%
Progressive	24.68%
Conservative	20.85%
Others	4.25%

== Results by province ==
Party name		BC	AB	SK	MB	ON	QC	NB	NS	PE	YK	Total
Liberal	Seats:	3	-	1	3	21	65	5	16	4	-	118
Liberal	Popular vote (%):	29.8	15.8	18.7	18.9	30.1	70.2	50.2	52.4	45.7	47.6	41.2
Progressive	Seats:	3	0	15	11	20	-	1	-	-		50
Progressive	Vote (%):	11.7	0	61.7	41.9	25.6	3.1	8.7	10.2	12.3		19.7
Conservative	Seats:	7	-	-	-	36	-	5	-	-	1	49
Conservative	Vote (%):	47.9	20.3	16.3	24.4	38.8	18.5	39.4	32.3	37.2	51.1	30.0
Labour	Seats:	-	2	-	1	-	-		-	-		3
Labour	Vote (%):	6.8	11.1	0.8	5.7	2.3	0.7		3.5	4.8		2.7
Independent	Seats:	-			-	2	-	-			-	2
Independent	Vote (%):	3.5			7.4	1.9	6.6	1.7			1.3	3.0
United Farmers of Alberta	Seats:		10									10
United Farmers of Alberta	Vote (%):		52.5									2.1
Independent Conservative	Seats:					1	-					1
Independent Conservative	Vote (%):					0.9	0.3					0.4
United Farmers of Ontario	Seats:					1						1
United Farmers of Ontario	Vote (%):					0.3						0.1
Independent Progressive	Seats:					1						1
Independent Progressive	Vote (%):					0.3						0.1
Total seats		13	12	16	15	82	65	11	16	4	1	235
Parties that won no seats:
Other	Vote (%):	0.4	0.2	2.4			0.6		1.6	5.2		1.0
Socialist	Vote (%):				1.8							0.1
Independent Liberal	Vote (%):					0.2						0.1

== Election aftermath ==
The Liberal Party took 41 per cent of the vote. It won all of Quebec, much of the Maritime Provinces, and a good portion of Ontario.

The Progressive Party, including the United Farmers of Alberta (UFA), won the second largest number of seats, dominating the Prairies, and winning almost a third of the seats in Ontario. Liberal and Conservative candidates were shut out in Alberta, with 10 UFA and two Labour candidates taking the province's 12 federal seats. The party won only one seat east of Ontario, however. Despite winning the second most seats, it declined to form the official opposition. It would be the only Canadian federal election before 1993 in which a party other than the Liberals or the Conservatives won the second-most seats.

The Unionists/Conservatives lost the most seats up to that time of any governing party at the federal level. They won fewer seats than the Progressives (despite winning more of the popular votes) but were named as the official opposition anyway. The Conservatives won much of the Ontario seats and had some support in the Maritimes and British Columbia but won no seats in the Prairies or in Quebec.

Three Labour MPs were elected: Independent Labour candidate J. S. Woodsworth won a Winnipeg seat largely due to his role in the 1919 Winnipeg general strike, and Labour Party candidates William Irvine and Joseph Tweed Shaw were elected in Calgary.

=== Majority or minority? ===
King's party won the most seats in the election but was still one seat short of a majority even if an Independent Liberal is counted as a Liberal.

Confusion between a majority and minority result may be caused by mislabelling of two Manitoba members as Liberals. Albert Blellock Hudson, a former provincial Liberal cabinet minister, was elected as an Independent Liberal (or Independent) over the official Liberal candidate, William Robert Hogarth. Arthur-Lucien Beaubien was elected in Provencher as a Progressive, defeating the sitting Liberal incumbent, John Patrick Molloy.

Later the Liberal Party lost two by-elections to Conservative candidates but later won a by-election in a seat that had been held by the Conservatives.

The Progressive caucus was less united than the Liberals or Conservatives, due to the formation of the Ginger Group, to which only some Progressives belonged, and the existence of the semi-autonomous United Farmers of Alberta group.

The Farmer MPs had promised among other things that they would reject the traditional Parliamentary traditions such as that of bending to the will of the party leader and whip. Many Progressives argued that an MP should be able to vote against the party line so long as the vote was in accordance to his constituents' wishes. As a result, King always found enough Progressive MPs who backed him on crucial votes. In the final session in 1925, 17 moderate Progressives consistently supported the Liberal government despite a caucus decision against them doing so.

There is no historical basis for the suggestion that in 1925 the government was brought down by an adverse vote due to a moment of confusion. This may itself result from confusion with the incident in the following Parliament (the 15th), when Arthur Meighen's government was defeated by one vote, becoming the first Canadian ministry to be defeated on a motion of non-confidence. In that vote, held on July 2, 1926, Rev. T. M. Bird (Progressive member for Nelson, Man.) stated he voted inadvertently, having been “paired” with another Progressive who was ill; if his vote had not been cast, the Meighen government would have likely survived on the vote of the Speaker breaking the tie.

== See also ==
- List of Canadian federal general elections
- List of political parties in Canada
- 11th Canadian Parliament
- 14th Canadian Parliament
- Women in Canadian politics
