= Ernest Winch =

Canadian politician (1879–1957)

Ernest Edward (Ernie) Winch
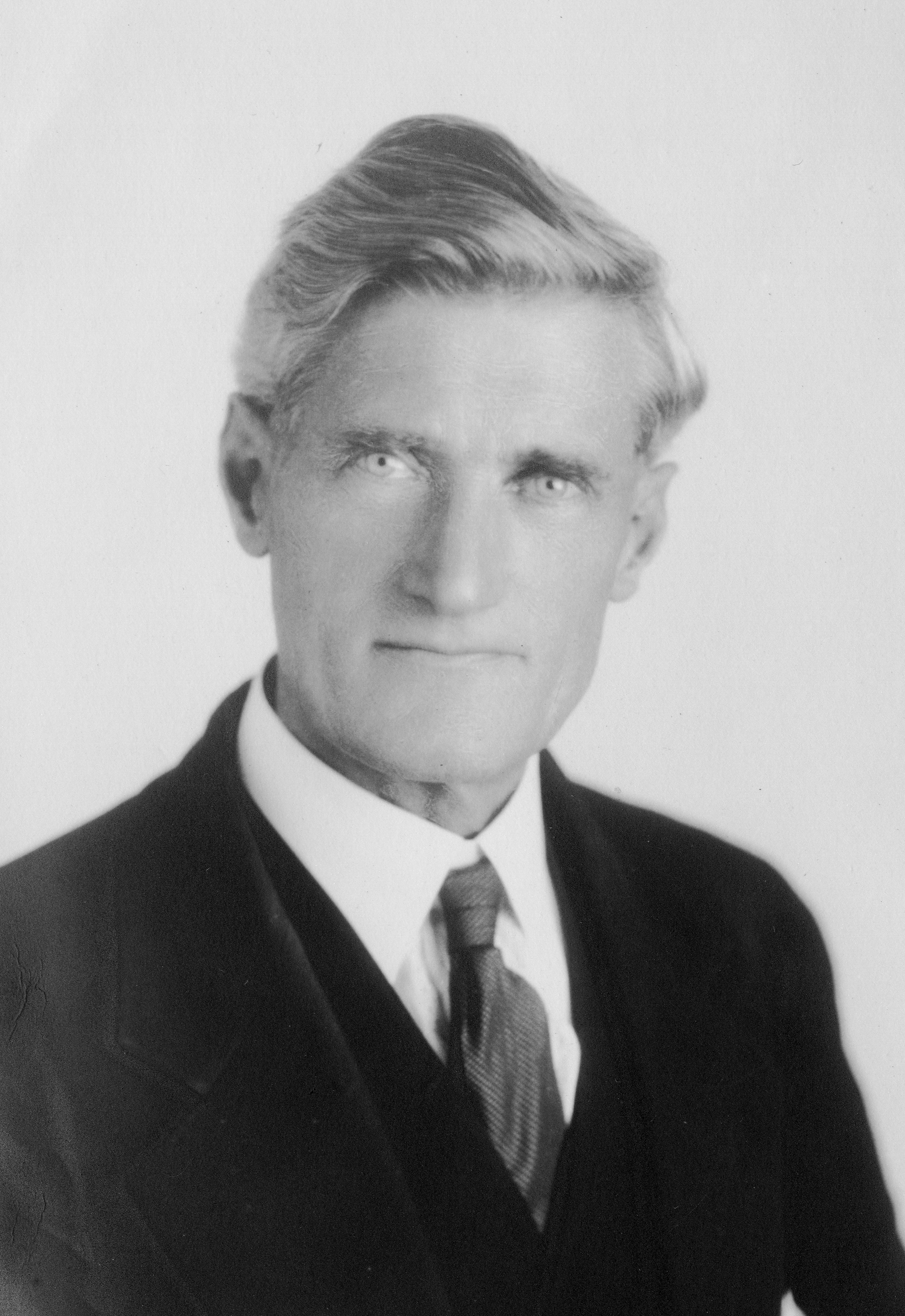
- Winch in 1933

Member of the Legislative Assembly of British Columbia for Burnaby
- In office November 2, 1933 – January 11, 1957
- Preceded by: William Robert Rutledge
- Succeeded by: Cedric Cox

Personal details
- Born: March 22, 1879 Harlow, England
- Died: January 11, 1957 (aged 77) Vancouver, British Columbia
- Party: Co-operative Commonwealth Federation
- Spouse: Linda Winch (née Hendy)
- Children: 6 (including Harold)

Ernest Edward (Ernie) Winch (March 22, 1879 – January 11, 1957) was a socialist British Columbia politician, trade unionist and organizer. He served eight terms as a BC Co-operative Commonwealth Federation MLA in the British Columbia Legislative Assembly from 1933 until his death in 1957. He was the father of Harold Winch, who was the leader of the BC CCF from 1939 to 1953.

== Biography ==
Born in England, Winch's father was a master bricklayer. The younger Winch apprenticed in the trade. In 1899 he went to Australia briefly and returned again in 1903 but again went back to England. In 1909, he came to Canada with his young family.

Winch began studying socialism in 1910 and joined the Social Democratic Party of Canada the following year, becoming its provincial secretary by 1913. In July 1918, he became president of the Vancouver Trade and Labour Council, and endorsed the Vancouver General Strike of 1918 and the Winnipeg General Strike of 1919. He also opposed conscription during the First World War.

A supporter of the One Big Union movement, Winch played an instrumental role in organizing the BC Logger Workers Industrial Union.

He was an active member of various left-wing parties including the Socialist Party of Canada and the Independent Labour Party. He helped to re-establish the Socialist Party of Canada (British Columbia) in 1932, which then affiliated with the new Co-operative Commonwealth Federation. In the 1933 provincial election, Winch, his son Harold Winch, and five others were elected to the BC legislature as the first CCF MLAs.

However, in 1936, the left/right divide within the CCF came into the open with the conflict between Winch and party house leader Robert Connell, that sparked an exodus after Connell was expelled. In 1938, Harold Winch was named leader.

In the 1940s, Winch was founder of the New Vista Society of Burnaby, whose mission was to provide housing for single women convalescing from mental illness. He also was a founder of the Association for the Protection of Fur-Bearing Animals.

Ernie Winch died on January 11, 1957. A Burnaby park is named after him.
