= Ezra Churchill Henniger =

Canadian politician

Member of the Legislative Assembly of British Columbia
- In office 1937–1941
- Preceded by: Dougald McPherson
- Succeeded by: Thomas Alfred Love
- Constituency: Grand Forks-Greenwood

Personal details
- Born: July 6, 1873 Upper Kennetcook, Nova Scotia
- Died: May 26, 1959 (aged 85) Grand Forks, British Columbia
- Party: British Columbia Liberal Party
- Spouse: Ann Doverty Robertson
- Children: 3
- Occupation: Merchant

Ezra Churchill Henniger (July 6, 1873 – May 26, 1959) was a Canadian politician. He served in the Legislative Assembly of British Columbia from 1920 to 1924 from the electoral district of Grand Forks and then again from 1937 to 1941 from the electoral district of Grand Forks-Greenwood, a member of the Liberal party. He was an unsuccessful candidate in both the 1924 and 1941 provincial elections.
