= Dougald MacPherson =

Canadian politician

Member of the Legislative Assembly of British Columbia
- In office 1925–1928
- Preceded by: John McKie
- Succeeded by: Charles Morgan Kingston
- Constituency: Grand Forks-Greenwood
- In office 1933–1937
- Preceded by: Charles Morgan Kingston
- Succeeded by: Ezra Churchill Henniger
- Constituency: Grand Forks-Greenwood

Personal details
- Born: October 23, 1882 Springfield, Nova Scotia
- Died: May 28, 1964 (aged 81) Penticton, British Columbia
- Party: British Columbia Liberal Party
- Spouse: Daisy Ellen Crowley
- Children: 2
- Occupation: automobile merchant

Dougald MacPherson (October 23, 1882 – May 28, 1964) was a Canadian politician. He served in the Legislative Assembly of British Columbia from a 1925 byelection to the 1928 provincial election and then again from the 1933 provincial election to the 1937 provincial election, for the electoral district of Grand Forks-Greenwood, a member of the Liberal party. He did not seek a third term in the Legislature in the 1937 provincial election.
