= Association for the Protection of Fur-Bearing Animals =

The Association for the Protection of Fur-Bearing Animals, also known as the Fur-bearer Defenders or APFA, was formed in British Columbia in 1944 under the leadership of Ernest Winch. The group's original aims were to assist in finding a "more humane" form of trapping wildlife, though in later years they decided to focus on trying to end the fur-trade in Canada.

Recent activities include helping communities investigate illegal/domestic trapping, ending the import of dog and cat fur, and assisting municipalities in coexisting with beavers.

The Association for the Protection of Fur-Bearing Animals began hosting Living With Wildlife conferences for municipal partners in 2011. The 2012 event, held in Toronto, Ontario, was deemed a success by various attendants. The 2013 Living With Wildlife conference took place in Vancouver, BC, on September 20. Audio, video and photos from the event are available online.

In October, 2013, APFA launched Defender Radio, a weekly podcast focusing on wildlife, the fur industry, animal advocacy and the science involved.
