= Kaslo-Slocan =

Defunct provincial electoral district in British Columbia, Canada

Kaslo-Slocan was the name of a provincial electoral district in the Canadian province of British Columbia centred on the town of Kaslo on Kootenay Lake as well as the mining towns of the "Silvery Slocan". The riding first appeared in the 1924 election as the result of a merger of the former ridings of Kaslo and Slocan, and lasted until the 1963 election.

== Electoral history ==
Note: Winners in each election are in bold.

16th British Columbia election, 1924
Party	Candidate	Votes	%	±	Expenditures
**Liberal**	**Charles Sidney Leary**	**799**	**39.11%**		unknown
Conservative	William Ernest Marshall	384	18.80%		unknown
Canadian Labour Party	George Faulds Stirling	260	12.73%		unknown
Provincial	Joseph James Threlkeld	600	29.37%	–	unknown
Total valid votes		2,043	100.00%		
Total rejected ballots					
Turnout		%			

17th British Columbia election, 1928
Party	Candidate	Votes	%	±	Expenditures
Conservative	**James Fitzsimmons**	**1,169**	**51.23%**		unknown
Liberal	Charles Sidney Leary	1,113	48.77%		unknown
Total valid votes		2,282	100.00%		
Total rejected ballots		69			
Turnout		%			

18th British Columbia election, 1933 ^{15}
Party	Candidate	Votes	%	±	Expenditures
Non-Partisan Independent Group	James Fitzsimmons	951	34.27%		unknown
**Liberal**	**Charles Sidney Leary**	**1,250**	**45.05%**		unknown
Co-operative Commonwealth Fed.	George Walton	574	20.68%		unknown
Total valid votes		2,775	100.00%		
Total rejected ballots		31			
Turnout		%			

19th British Columbia election, 1937
Party	Candidate	Votes	%	±	Expenditures
Social Credit League	Amos Craven	30	31.10	–	unknown
Conservative	James Fitzsimmons	715	26.11%		unknown
Co-operative Commonwealth Fed.	Amos Craven	929	33.93%		unknown
**Liberal**	**Charles Sidney Leary**	**1,064**	**38.86 %**		unknown
Conservative	Thomas Alfred Love	703	40.82%		
Social Constructive	Anthony Whitehead	133	7.72%		
Total valid votes		2,738	100.00%		
Total rejected ballots		30			

20th British Columbia election, 1941
Party	Candidate	Votes	%	±	Expenditures
Conservative	Arthur Ewart (John) Jukes	754	33.80%		unknown
**Liberal**	**Charles Sidney Leary**	**941**	**42.18%**		unknown
Co-operative Commonwealth Fed.	Hugh Earl Nelson	536	24.03%		unknown
Total valid votes		2,231	100.00%		
Total rejected ballots		27			
Turnout		%			

31st British Columbia election, 1945
Party	Candidate	Votes	%	±	Expenditures
**Co-operative Commonwealth Fed.**	**Randolph Harding**	**1,098**	**53.12%**		unknown
Coalition	Charles Sidney Leary	969	46.88%	–	unknown
Total valid votes		2,067	100.00%		
Total rejected ballots		34			
Turnout		%			

22nd British Columbia election, 1949
Party	Candidate	Votes	%	±	Expenditures
**Co-operative Commonwealth Fed.**	**Randolph Harding**	**1,633**	**53.19%**		unknown
Coalition	Thomas Melville Leask	1,437	46.81%	–	unknown
Total valid votes		3,070	100.00%		
Total rejected ballots		38			
Turnout		%			

23rd British Columbia election, 1952 ^{2}
Party	Candidate	Votes 1st count	%	Votes final count	%	±%	
B.C. Social Credit League	Edward Wilbert Bourque	597	18.97	-	-.- %		unknown
**Co-operative Commonwealth Fed.**	**Randolph Harding**	1,411	44.84%	1,792	64.18%		unknown
Liberal	Thomas Melville Leask	617	19.61%	1,000	35.82%		unknown
Conservative	Howard Milward Parker	522	16.59%	-	%		unknown
Total valid votes		3,147	100.00%	2,792	%		
Total rejected ballots		82					
Turnout		%					
^{2} Preferential ballot. First and final counts of three (3) shown only.

24th British Columbia election, 1953 ^{3}
Party	Candidate	Votes 1st count	%	Votes final count	%	±%	
**Co-operative Commonwealth Fed.**	**Randolph Harding**	1,481	47.17%	1,692	59.22%		unknown
Social Credit	Alexander Bradshaw Jacobs	867	27.61%	1,165	40.78%		
Liberal	Bessie Florence Leary	792	25.22%	-	-.- %		unknown
Total valid votes		3,140	100.00%	2,027	%		
Total rejected ballots		108					
Turnout		%					
^{3} Preferential ballot. First and final counts of two (2) shown only.

25th British Columbia election, 1956
Party	Candidate	Votes	%	±	Expenditures
Liberal	Frank Harold Abey	297	10.67%		unknown
**Co-operative Commonwealth Fed.**	**Randolph Harding**	**1,512**	**54.31%**		unknown
Social Credit	Michael Ernest Moran	975	35.02%	–	unknown
Total valid votes		2,784	100.00%		
Total rejected ballots		50			
Turnout		%			

26th British Columbia election, 1960
Party	Candidate	Votes	%	±	Expenditures
**Co-operative Commonwealth Fed.**	**Randolph Harding**	**1,298**	**50.35 %**		unknown
Progressive Conservative	John Verdner Humphries	244	9.46%		unknown
Liberal	Thomas Melville Leask	303	11.75%		unknown
Social Credit	Henry Edgar Parkyn	733	28.43%	–	unknown
Total valid votes		2,578	100.00%		
Total rejected ballots		23			
Turnout		%			

27th British Columbia election, 1963
Party	Candidate	Votes	%	±	Expenditures
Social Credit	Burton Peter Campbell	1,093	39.66%	–	unknown
New Democratic	**Randolph Harding**	**1,242**	**45.07%**		unknown
Liberal	Onni Matt Maja	301	10.92%		unknown
Progressive Conservative	Donald Walter Williams	120	4.35%		unknown
Total valid votes		2,756	100.00%		
Total rejected ballots		27			
Turnout		%			

The area was redistributed after the 1963 election. For the 1966 election, the Slocan area became part of Revelstoke-Slocan, while the Kaslo area became part of Nelson-Creston. The original riding name of Kootenay was re-established in this redistribution, but the new electoral district by that name was limited to the East Kootenay.

== See also ==
- List of British Columbia provincial electoral districts
- Canadian provincial electoral districts
- List of electoral districts in the Kootenays
