= Henry George Parson =

Canadian politician (1865–1936)

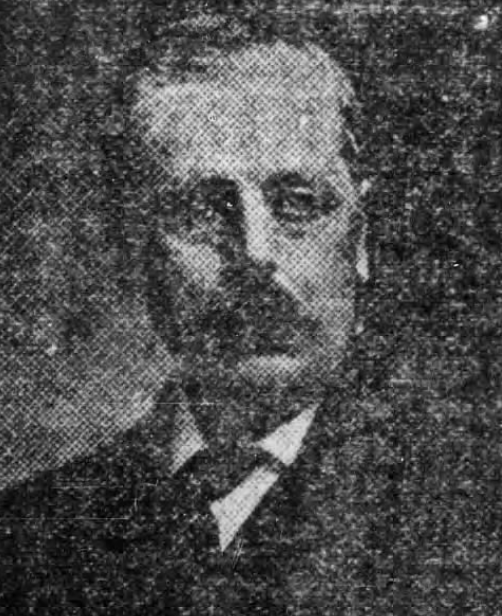

Member of the Legislative Assembly of British Columbia
- In office 1907–1912
- Constituency: Columbia

Personal details
- Born: September 13, 1865 London, England
- Died: February 5, 1936 (aged 70) Vancouver, British Columbia
- Party: Conservative
- Spouse: Mary Jane Reid (m. 1889)
- Occupation: Merchant, politician

Henry George Parson (September 13, 1865 – February 5, 1936) was an English-born merchant and political figure in British Columbia. He represented Columbia from 1907 to 1912 as a Conservative. He was defeated when he sought re-election in the 1912 provincial election and then again in the 1920 provincial election.

He was born in London, the son of George F. Parson, and was educated there. Parson came to Ottawa in 1883, moved to Banff in 1885 and then came to British Columbia in 1887. In 1889, he married Mary Jane Reid. Parson lived in Golden. He served as president of the Golden Board of Trade and of the Golden Hospital Society. He was chairman of the Royal Commission of Labour which produced its report in 1914. Parson died in Vancouver at the age of 70.

The community of Parson near Golden was named after him.
