= Charles MacSorley =

Canadian politician

Charles Willoughby MacSorley (October 2, 1895 – February 24, 1976) was a labourer, engineer and political figure in British Columbia. He represented Burnaby in the Legislative Assembly of British Columbia from 1963 to 1966 as a Social Credit member.

He was born in Picton, Ontario and moved to Manitoba and then Asquith, Saskatchewan with his family. MacSorley served overseas with the 65th Regiment during World War I. After the war, he returned to Saskatchewan and served on the local school board. MacSorley married Grace Dobbs in 1924 and they moved to Burnaby, British Columbia. He was employed as a labourer by the Corporation of Burnaby and served as president of the Civic Employees Union. In 1932, he was hired by Shell Oil where he worked his way up to the position of engineer. MacSorley was elected to the Burnaby municipal council and served as reeve from 1954 to 1957. He also served as chairman of the Greater Vancouver Water District, chairman of the Greater Vancouver Sewerage District and president of the Union of BC Municipalities. MacSorley was defeated by Fred Vulliamy when he ran for reelection to the provincial assembly in the newly created riding of Burnaby-Willingdon in 1966.
