= Lois Haggen =

Canadian politician (1899–1994)

MLA for Grand Forks-Greenwood
- In office 1956–1966
- Preceded by: Rupert Haggen
- Succeeded by: riding dissolved

Personal details
- Born: Lois Mabel Hill; September 16, 1899 Mobile, Alabama
- Died: February 28, 1994 (aged 94) Grand Forks, British Columbia
- Party: CCF → New Democrat
- Spouse: Rupert Haggen

Lois Mabel Haggen, (née Hill; September 16, 1899 – February 28, 1994) was a Canadian politician, who represented the electoral district of Grand Forks-Greenwood in the Legislative Assembly of British Columbia from 1956 to 1966. She was a member of the Co-operative Commonwealth Federation, which became the New Democratic Party during her term in office.

Born in Mobile, Alabama in 1899, she came to Canada and worked as a secretary. In 1925, she married Rupert Williams Haggen. After her husband became seriously ill, she succeeded him in the provincial assembly.

Following riding redistribution for the 1966 provincial election, Haggen ran for re-election in the new Boundary-Similkameen district, but was defeated by Frank Richter, Jr.

In 1966, Haggen went to the United Nations as Canada's representative on the Human Rights Committee. She died at Grand Forks in February 1994.
