= South Vancouver (electoral district) =

Defunct provincial electoral district in British Columbia, Canada

South Vancouver was a provincial electoral district of British Columbia, Canada. It first appeared on the hustings in the general election of 1916 (South Vancouver then was incorporated separately from the city of Vancouver).

Following the 1928 election the South Vancouver riding was redistributed. Parts of it were put in different ridings, principally the new ridings of Vancouver-Point Grey and Vancouver East.

== Electoral history ==
Note: Winners in each election are in bold.

1916 British Columbia general election
Party	Candidate	Votes	%
Independent Liberal	John Walter Weart	1,579	45.75
Conservative	William Boulton	1,374	39.81
Independent Labour	Job Elija Wilton	498	14.43
Total valid votes		3,451	100.00

15th British Columbia election, 1920
Party	Candidate	Votes	%	±	Expenditures
Conservative	Frederick O. Hodgson	2,444	28.34%		unknown
Independent	John William McIntosh	955	11.08%		unknown
**Federated Labour Party**	**Robert Henry Neelands**	**3,255**	**37.75%**		unknown
Conservative	Franklin John Russell	1,969	22.83%		unknown
Total valid votes		8,623	100.00%		
Total rejected ballots					
Turnout		%			

16th British Columbia election, 1924
Party	Candidate	Votes	%	±	Expenditures
**Liberal**	Walter John Buckingham	1,141	22.43%		unknown
Conservative	Jonathan Webster Cornett	1,284	25.24%		unknown
**Canadian Labour Party**	**Robert Henry Neelands**	**1,971**	**38.74%**		unknown
Provincial	James Nixon	692	13.60%	–	unknown
Total valid votes		5,088	100.00%		
Total rejected ballots					
Turnout		%			

17th British Columbia election, 1928
Party	Candidate	Votes	%	±	Expenditures
Conservative	**Jonathan Webster Cornett**	**2,452**	**47.45%**		unknown
Liberal	Charles William Feast	696	13.47%		unknown
Independent	William Edward Wood Guy	39	0.75%		unknown
Independent Labour Party ^{1}	Robert Henry Neelands	1,981	38.33%		unknown
Provincial	James Nixon	692	13.60%	–	unknown
Total valid votes		5,168	100.00%		
Total rejected ballots		164			
Turnout		%			
^{1} Labour in Summary of Votes

== See also ==
- List of British Columbia provincial electoral districts
- Canadian provincial electoral districts
- Vancouver (electoral districts)
