= William Robert Rutledge =

Canadian politician (1866–1948)

Member of the Legislative Assembly of British Columbia
- In office 1928–1933
- Preceded by: Francis Aubrey Browne
- Succeeded by: Ernest Edward Winch
- Constituency: Burnaby

Personal details
- Born: March 5, 1866 Belmore, Canada West
- Died: February 29, 1948 (aged 81) Vancouver, British Columbia
- Party: Conservative Party of British Columbia
- Spouse: Florence Bowman
- Children: 11
- Occupation: Marine Checker

William Robert Rutledge (March 5, 1866 – February 29, 1948) was a Canadian politician who represented Burnaby electoral district as a Conservative Party member in the Legislative Assembly of British Columbia from 1928 until his retirement at the 1933 provincial election.
