= Grand Forks-Greenwood =

Defunct provincial electoral district in British Columbia, Canada

Grand Forks-Greenwood was the name of a provincial electoral district in the Canadian province of British Columbia centred on the town of Grand Forks, in the Boundary Country between the Okanagan and Kootenay Countries. The riding first appeared in the 1924 election as the result of a merger of the former ridings of Greenwood and Grand Forks, and lasted until the 1963 election. As of 1966 the area was represented by Boundary-Similkameen. The same area is now part of West Kootenay-Boundary.

== Electoral history ==
Note: Winners in each election are in bold.

16th British Columbia election, 1924
Party	Candidate	Votes	%	±	Expenditures
Provincial	Arthur Strickland Clinton	331	19.21%	–	unknown
Liberal	Ezra Churchill Henniger	642	37.26%		unknown
Conservative	**John McKie**	**750**	**43.53%**		unknown
Total valid votes		1,723	100.00%		
Total rejected ballots					
Turnout		%			

17th British Columbia election, 1928
Party	Candidate	Votes	%	±	Expenditures
Conservative	**Charles Morgan Kingston**	**888**	**52.92 %**		unknown
Liberal	Dougald McPherson	790	47.08%		unknown
Total valid votes		1,678	100.00%		
Total rejected ballots		33			
Turnout		%			

18th British Columbia election, 1933 ^{15}
Party	Candidate	Votes	%	±	Expenditures
Co-operative Commonwealth Fed.t	Robert Lawson	221	12.51%		unknown
Non-Partisan Independent Group	Thomas Alfred Love	511	28.94%	–	unknown
Liberal	Dougald McPherson	1,034	58.55%		unknown
Total valid votes		1,766	100.00%		
Total rejected ballots		^{1}			
Turnout		%			
^{1} Details of returns were not supplied by the Returning Officer, only the total valid votes for each candidate, so the number of rejected ballots is unknown.

19th British Columbia election, 1937
Party	Candidate	Votes	%	±	Expenditures
Co-operative Commonwealth Fed.	Wilbert Richard Braithwaite	164	9.52%		unknown
**Liberal**	**Ezra Churchill Henniger**	**722**	**41.93%**		unknown
Conservative	Thomas Alfred Love	703	40.82%		
Social Constructive	Anthony Whitehead	133	7.72%		
Total valid votes		1,722	100.00%		
Total rejected ballots		29			

20th British Columbia election, 1941
Party	Candidate	Votes	%	±	Expenditures
Co-operative Commonwealth Fed.	Alan Conway Clapp	365	22.20%		unknown
Liberal	Ezra Churchill Henniger	637	38.75%		unknown
Conservative	Thomas Alfred Love	**642**	**39.05%**		unknown
Total valid votes		1,644	100.00%		
Total rejected ballots		4			
Turnout		%			

1945 British Columbia general election
Party	Candidate	Votes	%
Liberal-Conservative Coalition	Thomas Alfred Love	707	52.06
Co-operative Commonwealth	John Townely Rezeau Lawrence	461	33.95
Independent Labour	Charles Westley Clark	106	7.81
Labor–Progressive	Alan Conway Clapp	84	6.19
Total valid votes		1,358	100.00
Total rejected ballots		27	

22nd British Columbia election, 1949
Party	Candidate	Votes	%	±	Expenditures
**Co-operative Commonwealth Fed.**	**Rupert Haggen**	**922**	**44.14%**		unknown
Coalition	Thomas Alfred Love	873	41.79%	–	unknown
Independent	Edwin Stanley Orris	294	14.07%		unknown
Total valid votes		2,089	100.00%		
Total rejected ballots		23			
Turnout		%			

23rd British Columbia election, 1952 ^{2}
Party	Candidate	Votes 1st count	%	Votes final count	%	±%	
**Co-operative Commonwealth Fed.**	**Rupert Haggen**	**826**	**39.79%**	**1,043**	**53.08%**		unknown
Conservative	Cecil Gordon McMynn	706	34.01%	922	46.92%		unknown
Liberal	Edwin Stanley Orris	252	12.14%	-	%		unknown
B.C. Social Credit League	Henry Edgar Parkyn	292	14.07%	-	%		unknown
Total valid votes		2,076	100.00%	1,965	%		
Total rejected ballots		58					
Turnout		%					
^{2} Preferential ballot. First and final counts of three (3) shown only.

24th British Columbia election, 1953 ^{3}
Party	Candidate	Votes 1st count	%	Votes final count	%	±%	
Conservative	Ruth Ellen May Euerby	177	8.51%	-	-.- %		unknown
**Co-operative Commonwealth Fed.**	**Rupert Haggen**	**995**	**47.86%**	**1,016**	**50.12%**		unknown
Social Credit	Gordon Clarke McPhail	583	28.05%	618	30.49%		
Liberal	Klaus Scheer	324	15.58%	393	19.39%		unknown
Total valid votes		2,079	100.00%	2,027	%		
Total rejected ballots		145					
Turnout		%					
^{3} Preferential ballot. First and final counts of two (2) shown only.

25th British Columbia election, 1956
Party	Candidate	Votes	%	±	Expenditures
Social Credit	Hilbert Crae Dawson	866	42.04%	–	unknown
**Co-operative Commonwealth Fed.**	**Lois Haggen**	**877**	**42.57%**		unknown
Liberal	John Morris Jones	317	15.39%		unknown
Total valid votes		2,060	100.00%		
Total rejected ballots		34			
Turnout		%			

26th British Columbia election, 1960
Party	Candidate	Votes	%	±	Expenditures
Social Credit	Joseph Clinton Armstrong	752	28.56 %	–	unknown
**Co-operative Commonwealth Fed.**	**Lois Haggen**	**1,115**	**42.35%**		unknown
Liberal	Frank Martin	564	21.42%		unknown
Progressive Conservative	Yasushi Sugimoto	202	7.67%		unknown
Total valid votes		2,633	100.00%		
Total rejected ballots		40			
Turnout		%			

27th British Columbia election, 1963
Party	Candidate	Votes	%	±	Expenditures
Social Credit	Daniel Dominic Geronazzo	705	29.50%	–	unknown
New Democratic	**Lois Haggen**	**919**	**38.45%**		unknown
Liberal	Milo Joseph McGarry	766	32.05%		unknown
Total valid votes		2,390	100.00%		
Total rejected ballots		20			
Turnout		%			

The Boundary area was redistributed following the 1963 election. The new riding representing the area as of the 1966 election was Boundary-Similkameen.

== See also ==
- List of British Columbia provincial electoral districts
- Canadian provincial electoral districts
- Kootenay (electoral districts)
