= Arthur Ormiston Cochrane =

Canadian politician (1879–1926)

Member of the Legislative Assembly of British Columbia
- In office 1924–1926
- Preceded by: Kenneth Cattanach MacDonald
- Succeeded by: William Farris Kennedy
- Constituency: North Okanagan

Personal details
- Born: June 21, 1879 Whitby, Ontario
- Died: December 4, 1926 (aged 47) Vernon, British Columbia
- Party: British Columbia Conservative Party
- Spouse: Helen R. Christian
- Children: 7
- Occupation: lawyer

Arthur Ormiston Cochrane (June 21, 1879 – December 4, 1926) was a Canadian politician. He served in the Legislative Assembly of British Columbia from a 1924 byelection until 1926, from the electoral district of North Okanagan, a member of the Conservative party. He died in office in 1926 of heart disease (angina pectoris).
