= Andrew McCreight Creery =

Canadian politician

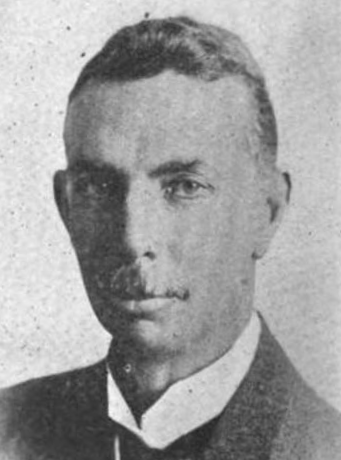

Member of the Legislative Assembly of British Columbia
- In office 1924–1928
- Constituency: Vancouver City

Personal details
- Born: June 2, 1863; Ardglass, Ireland
- Died: February 14, 1942 (aged 78); Victoria, British Columbia
- Political party: Provincial
- Spouse: Anna Hulbert (m. 1889)
- Education: Foyle College; Trinity College
- Occupation: Businessman, politician

Andrew McCreight Creery (June 2, 1863 – February 14, 1942) was an Irish-born financial, real estate and insurance agent and political figure in British Columbia. He represented Vancouver City in the Legislative Assembly of British Columbia from 1924 to 1928 as a Provincial Party member. He did not seek a second term in the Legislature in either the 1928 provincial election or a subsequent election.

== Biography ==
He was born in Ardglass, County Down, the son of Andrew Creery and Alice Tate, and was educated at Foyle College in Derry and Trinity College in Dublin. Creery came to Canada in 1888, first settling in Calgary, Alberta. He married Anna Hulbert the following year. In 1890, he moved to Vancouver. Creery was a Grand Master in the Freemasons.

His son Second Lieutenant Ronald Hulbert Creery was killed in France in 1917 during World War I.

Andrew McCreight Creery died in Victoria on February 14, 1942.
