= Richmond-Point Grey =

Defunct provincial electoral district in British Columbia, Canada

Richmond-Point Grey was a provincial electoral district for the Legislative Assembly of British Columbia, Canada. It first appeared in the provincial election of 1924 and lasted only through the election of 1928. It was created out of most of Richmond and abolished into Vancouver-Point Grey and Delta.

== Election results ==
B.C. General Election 1924 Richmond-Point Grey
Party	Candidate	Votes	%	±	Expenditures
Conservative	William Wasbrough	2,063	34.05%		
Liberal	Hiram Perry McCraney	1,855	30.62%		
Provincial	George Alexander Walkem	2,141	35.34%	–	
Total		6,059			

B.C. General Election 1928: Richmond-Point Grey
Party	Candidate	Votes	%	±	Expenditures
Liberal	Robert Henry Carson	3,296	37.84%		
Conservative	Samuel Lyness Howe	5,414	62.16%		
Total Valid Votes		8,710	100.00%		
Total Rejected Ballots		150	%		
Turnout					

== See also ==
- List of British Columbia provincial electoral districts
- Canadian provincial electoral districts
