= Burnaby (provincial electoral district) =

Defunct provincial electoral district in British Columbia, Canada

Burnaby was a provincial electoral district of British Columbia, Canada, that first appeared on the hustings in the 1924 election. For the federal electoral district of the same name, please see Burnaby (federal electoral district).

== Geography ==
The riding originally included an eastern portion of South Vancouver. From 1933 it was identical with the Municipality of Burnaby, other than areas near to New Westminster which were included in the New Westminster electoral district. At the time of the riding's creation much of Burnaby was still semi-rural and development was confined to the Kingsway corridor (then "Westminster Highway"), along Hastings Street and Broadway (near Lougheed Highway), and along the two mainlines of the British Columbia Electric Railway via Central Park and Burnaby Lake.

== Electoral history ==
Note: Winners of each election are in bold.

16th British Columbia election, 1924
Party	Candidate	Votes	%	±	Expenditures
**Canadian Labour**	**Francis Aubrey Browne**	**1,567**	**31.22%**		unknown
Liberal	Hugh Murray Fraser	1,324	26.37%	–	unknown
Provincial	Alexander Kenneth McLean	1,155	23.01%	–	unknown
Conservative	Thomas Sanderson	974	19.40%		unknown
Total valid votes		5,020	100.00%		
Turnout		%			

1928 British Columbia general election
Party	Candidate	Votes	%
Conservative	William Robert Rutledge	2,144	40.81
Liberal	John Angus McIver	1,779	33.87
Independent Labour	Francis Aubrey Browne	1,330	25.32
Total valid votes		5,253	100.00
Total rejected ballots		125	

1933 British Columbia general election
Party	Candidate	Votes	%
Co-operative Commonwealth	Ernest Edward Winch	4,548	39.27
Liberal	Eleanor Walker Johnson	4,020	34.72
Unionist	Frederick William Ball Law	1,051	9.08
United Front (Workers and Farmers)	John Stevenson	694	5.99
Non-Partisan Independent Group	Gilbert Wainwright Hall	519	4.48
Independent Co-operative Commonwealth	James Elman Johnston	344	2.97
Progressive Liberal	William Henry Lench	353	3.05
Socialist	James King	29	0.25
Independent	Hans John Diffner	22	0.19
Total valid votes		11,580	100.00
Total rejected ballots		138	

19th British Columbia election, 1937
Party	Candidate	Votes	%	±	Expenditures
Conservative	Howard Wilfrid Clegg	2,307	17.19%		unknown
Liberal	William Ewart Grieve	3,379	25.18%	–	unknown
Social Credit League	Herbert Wesley Halling	136	1.01%	–	unknown
Independent	Eleanor Walker Johnson	1,009	7.52%		unknown
Social Constructive	Roderick Charles MacDonald	644	4.80%		unknown
Independent	Louis Elmo Walker	34	0.25%		unknown
**Co-operative Commonwealth Fed.**	**Ernest Edward Winch**	**5,908**	**44.03%**		unknown
Total valid votes		13,417	100.00%		
Total rejected ballots		121			

20th British Columbia election, 1941
Party	Candidate	Votes	%	±	Expenditures
Conservative	Charles Clare Bell	2,707	20.79%		unknown
Religious Political Brotherhood	Archibald Emmanuel Hardy	105	0.81%		unknown
Liberal	Aubrey Charles Peck	3,762	28.90%		unknown
**Co-operative Commonwealth Fed.**	**Ernest Edward Winch**	**6,444**	**49.50%**		unknown
Total valid votes		13,018			
Total rejected ballots		237			

21st British Columbia election, 1945
Party	Candidate	Votes	%	±	Expenditures
Social Credit Alliance	(Mrs.) Lyle Campbell	298	2.55%		unknown
Coalition	Vernon James Lewis	4,733	40.52%	–	unknown
Labor-Progressive	Elizabeth Wilson	744	6.37%		unknown
Co-operative Commonwealth Fed.	**Ernest Edward Winch**	5,905	50.56%		unknown
Total valid votes		11,680	100.00%		
Total rejected ballots		302			
Turnout		%			

22nd British Columbia election, 1949
Party	Candidate	Votes	%	±	Expenditures
Coalition	George Andrew Morrison	9,981	46.08%	–	unknown
Social Credit League	Henry George Rhodes	655	3.02%	–	unknown
**Co-operative Commonwealth**	**Ernest Edward Winch**	**11,025**	**50.90%**		unknown
Total valid votes		21,661	100.00%		
Total rejected ballots		204			
Turnout		%			

23rd British Columbia election, 1952^{1}
Party	Candidate	Votes 1st count	%	Votes final count	%	±%
Liberal	Ronald William Fairclough	3,816	14.15%	4,919	18.84%	
Progressive Conservative	Oscar Rudolph Olson	2,807	10.41%	-	-.- %	
Social Credit League	Clement Frederick Stelter	6,750	25.03%	7,780	29.79%	
**Co-operative Commonwealth Fed.**	**Ernest Edward Winch**	**12,933**	**47.96%**	**13,416**	**51.37%**	
Christian Democratic	Bernard William Worsley	662	2.45%	-	-.- %	
Total valid votes		26,968	%	26,115	100.00%	
Total rejected ballots		789				
Turnout		%				
^{1} Preferential ballot; only one count necessary due to majority on first count.

24th British Columbia election, 1953 ^{2}
Party	Candidate	Votes 1st count	%	Votes final count	%	±%
Social Credit League	Ernest Arthur Crampton	8,151	31.85%	8,161	31.98%	
Liberal	Mary Edith McDonald	3,351	13.09%	3,364	13.18%	
Progressive Conservative	Frederick Marven Stephens	641	2.50%	646	2.53%	
Labor-Progressive	William John Turner	367	1.43%	-	-.- %	
**Co-operative Commonwealth Fed.**	**Ernest Edward Winch**	12,689	49.58%	12,947	50.73%	
Christian Democratic	Bernard William Worsley	396	1.55%	401	1.57%	
Total valid votes		25,595	100.00%	25,519	%	
Total rejected ballots		1,058				
Total Registered Voters						
Turnout		%				
^{2} Preferential ballot; first and final of two (two) counts only shown.

25th British Columbia election, 1956 ^{3}
Party	Candidate	Votes	%	±	Expenditures
Liberal	Emmet Cafferky	3,895	6.43%	–	unknown
**Co-operative Commonwealth Fed.**	**Gordon Dowding**	**12,692**	**20.96%**		unknown
Progressive Conservative	John A.W. Drysdale	513	0.84%	-	unknown
Liberal	James Henry Edwards	3,972	6.56%	–	unknown
Progressive Conservative	Malcolm Fitzgerald Green	478	0.80%	-	unknown
Social Credit	Kenneth Martin Hoffman	11,583	19.13%	–	unknown
Social Credit	William Parker Philps	12,103	20.00%	–	unknown
**Co-operative Commonwealth Fed.**	**Ernest Edward Winch**	**15,304**	**25.28%**		unknown
Total valid votes		60,540	100.00%		
Total rejected ballots		236			
Turnout		%			
^{3} Seat increased to two members from one.

26th British Columbia election, 1960
Party	Candidate	Votes	%	±	Expenditures
Social Credit	Hilliard Harold William Beyerstein	13,469	16.98%	–	unknown
**Co-operative Commonwealth Fed.**	**Cedric Cox**	**17,659**	**22.27%**		unknown
**Co-operative Commonwealth Fed.**	**Gordon Dowding**	**17,522**	**22.09%**		unknown
Progressive Conservative	Malcolm Fitzgerald Green	1,069	1.35%		unknown
Social Credit	Thomas Irwin	13,394	16.89%	–	unknown
Liberal	Graham B. Ladner	7,601	9.58%	–	unknown
Liberal	William Lindsay	7,111	8.97%	–	unknown
Communist	Harold James Pritchett	409	0.52%		unknown
Progressive Conservative	Florence B. Zucco	1,075	1.36%		unknown
Total valid votes		79,309	100.00%		
Total rejected ballots		589			
Turnout		%			

27th British Columbia election, 1963
Party	Candidate	Votes	%	±	Expenditures
Liberal	Edward Marshall Bauder	5,472	7.43%	–	unknown
Social Credit	Hilliard Harold William Beyerstein	14,070	19.12%	–	unknown
New Democratic	Cedric Cox	14,409	19.58%		unknown
**Co-operative Commonwealth Fed.**	**Gordon Dowding**	**14,750**	**20.04%**		unknown
Liberal	Ronald William Fairclough	5,641	7.66%	–	unknown
Progressive Conservative	Esmond Sibley Gladwin	2,263	3.07%		unknown
Social Credit	**Charles Willoughby MacSorley**	**14,650**	**19.91%**	–	unknown
Progressive Conservative	Christopher John McKin Thomson	2,343	3.18%		unknown
Total valid votes		73,598	100.00%		
Total rejected ballots		20			
Turnout		%			

The Burnaby riding was partitioned in the large redistribution prior to the 1966 election. Successor ridings were Burnaby-Edmonds, Burnaby-Willingdon and Burnaby North.

== See also ==
- List of British Columbia provincial electoral districts
- Canadian provincial electoral districts
