= Jack Loutet =

Canadian politician

Jack Loutet (October 15, 1885 – October 11, 1966) was a Scottish-born real estate and insurance agent and political figure in British Columbia. He represented North Vancouver in the Legislative Assembly of British Columbia from 1930 to 1933 as a Conservative.

He was born in Coupar Angus, Perthshire, the son of John Loutet and Catherine Yates Lindsay, and came to Canada in 1905. In 1909, he married Blanche C. Rerrie, originally from St. Ann's Bay, Jamaica. Loutet served as councillor (1911–21), reeve (1923) and mayor (1945–47) for North Vancouver, British Columbia. He was also the first postmaster for the North Lonsdale post office. Loutet was the first president of the Notaries' Society of BC. He ran unsuccessfully for a seat in the provincial assembly in 1928. Loutet was elected in a 1930 by-election held after Ian Alistair MacKenzie was named to the federal cabinet. He was defeated when he ran for reelection in 1933 and again in 1937. Loutet died in North Vancouver at the age of 80. Loutet park in North Vancouver is named after him.
