= George Heggie =

Canadian politician from British Columbia

George Heggie (September 27, 1870 – February 21, 1953) was an Irish-born farmer and political figure in British Columbia. He represented North Okanagan in the Legislative Assembly of British Columbia from a 1930 byelection until his retirement at the 1933 provincial election as a Conservative.

He came to Canada in 1895 as manager for Sir Arthur Stepney's ranch near Enderby. He served on the council for Vernon and was also a justice of the peace. Heggie was the first president of the Vernon Fruit Union. He was manager of the Land and Agricultural Company in Vernon from 1910 to 1942.
