= Rupert Haggen =

Canadian politician

MLA for Grand Forks-Greenwood
- In office 1949–1956
- Preceded by: Thomas Alfred Love
- Succeeded by: Lois Haggen

Personal details
- Born: July 29, 1887 Napier, New Zealand
- Died: July 19, 1962 (aged 74) Grand Forks, British Columbia, Canada
- Party: CCF
- Spouse: Lois Haggen
- Occupation: land surveyor

Rupert Williams Haggen (July 29, 1887 – July 19, 1962) was a Canadian politician, who represented the electoral district of Grand Forks-Greenwood in the Legislative Assembly of British Columbia from 1949 to 1956. He had previously been an unsuccessful candidate in the electoral district of Cariboo in the 1933 provincial election and in the electoral district of Rossland-Trail in the 1945 provincial election. He was a member of the Co-operative Commonwealth Federation.

He was born in New Zealand and came to Canada in 1901. Haggen finished his education, qualifying as an engineer and was hired by the Canadian Pacific Railway. From 1909 to 1934, he practised as a mining and civil engineer. He also was qualified as a Dominion and B.C. Land Surveyor and served as president of the B.C. Land Surveyors' Association. In 1935, he moved to the Kootenay region, settling in Rossland. Later, Haggen became a notary public, opening offices in Rossland, Grand Forks and Kelowna.

He retired from politics in 1956 due to health problems and was succeeded by his wife, Lois Haggen, the former Lois Hill.

He died in Grand Forks at the age of 74.
