= Edward Dodsley Barrow =

Canadian politician (1867–1956)

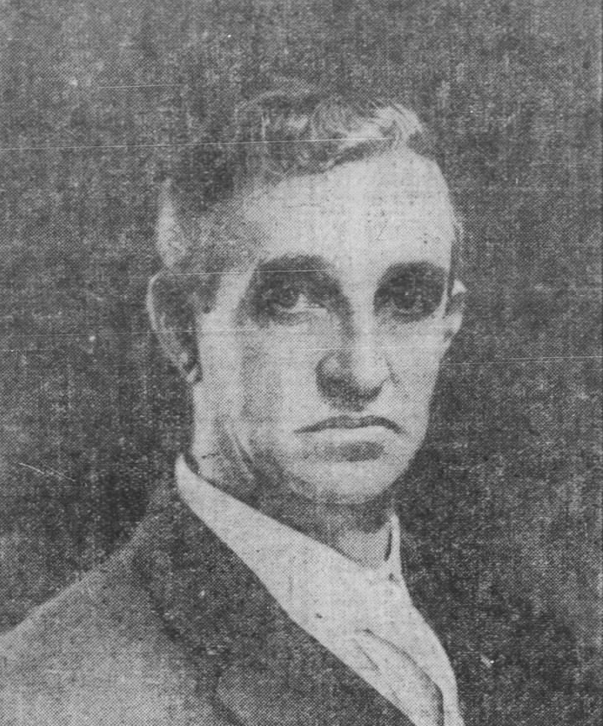

Member of the Legislative Assembly of British Columbia for Chilliwack
- In office 1933–1937
- Preceded by: William Atkinson
- Succeeded by: Leslie Harvey Eyres
- In office 1916–1928
- Preceded by: District created
- Succeeded by: William Atkinson

Personal details
- Born: September 29, 1867 Ringwood, Hampshire, England
- Died: December 28, 1956 (aged 89) Sardis, British Columbia

Edward Dodsley Barrow (September 29, 1867 – December 28, 1956) was a Canadian politician.

Born in Ringwood, Hampshire, England, the son of Stephen and Sarah (Barnes) Barrow, Barrow emigrated to Chilliwack, British Columbia in 1892. A farmer, he was President of the Chilliwack Creamery Association and President of the Fraser Valley Milk Producers' Association. He served as Councillor of the Township of Chilliwack. In 1916, he was first elected to the Legislative Assembly of British Columbia as the Liberal candidate for the electoral district of Chilliwack. In 1918, he was appointed Minister of Agriculture in the cabinet of John Oliver. He served in that post until his defeat in the 1928 provincial election. He returned to the Legislature for one more term in the 1933 provincial election. He was defeated for a second time in the 1937 provincial election. He did not seek provincial office again. He died in 1956.
