= Charles Sidney Leary =

Canadian politician

Charles Sidney Leary (March 4, 1883 – 1950) was an English-born lumberman and political figure in British Columbia. He represented Kaslo-Slocan in the Legislative Assembly of British Columbia from 1924 to 1928 and from 1933 to 1945 as a Liberal.

He was born on March 4, 1883, in England. In 1922, he married Bessie Florence Jordan. They had three daughters: Mary Eileen, Sheila Florence, and Sydney. He operated a sawmill at Nakusp. Leary served as a captain during World War I. From 1917 to 1918, he was involved in timber operations in Cyprus. During that time, he acquired antiquities from Egypt and Cyprus, which were later donated to the Museum of Anthropology at the University of British Columbia. Leary was defeated by James Fitzsimmons when he ran for reelection in 1928; he defeated Fitzsimmons in the 1933 general election. Leary was defeated when he ran for reelection in 1945 as a member of the Liberal-Conservative coalition. He served in the provincial cabinet as Minister of Public Works and as Minister of Railways from 1939 to 1941. In 1941, he also served as Minister of Trade and Industry and as Minister of Mines. He died of a heart attack in 1950 while vacationing in Manatee, Florida.

Mount Leary was named in his honour.
