= Jonathan Webster Cornett =

Canadian politician (1883–1973)

Jonathan Webster Cornett (10 March 1883 – 19 August 1973) was the 25th mayor of Vancouver, British Columbia from 1941 to 1946. He was born in Lansdowne, Ontario, moving to Vancouver in 1907.

"Jack" Cornett was the final reeve of South Vancouver before it was absorbed into Vancouver in 1929. His mayoral campaign included a patriotic theme at a time when Canada was involved with World War II.

After an unsuccessful attempt in the 1924 provincial election, Cornett was elected to the British Columbia Legislative Assembly as a British Columbia Conservative Party MLA for South Vancouver in 1928 and served one term. He did not seek re-election in the 1933 provincial election.
