= Thomas Alfred Love =

Member of the Legislative Assembly of British Columbia
- In office 1941–1949
- Preceded by: Ezra Churchill Henniger
- Succeeded by: Rupert Haggen
- Constituency: Grand Forks-Greenwood

Personal details
- Born: March 19, 1883 Stanton, Ontario
- Died: May 1, 1955 (aged 72) Vancouver, British Columbia
- Party: Coalition/Conservative
- Spouse: Louise Livingston
- Children: 4
- Occupation: newspaper editor, owner

Thomas Alfred Love (March 19, 1883 – May 1, 1955) was a Canadian politician. He served in the Legislative Assembly of British Columbia from 1941 to 1949 from the electoral district of Grand Forks-Greenwood, a member of the Coalition government.
