= Thomas George Coventry =

Canadian politician (1885–1972)

Thomas George Coventry (August 25, 1885 – December 9, 1972) was an English-born agent and political figure in British Columbia. He represented Saanich in the Legislative Assembly of British Columbia from 1924 to 1928 as a Conservative. He did not seek a second term in the 1928 provincial election.

He was born in London, the son of the Earl of Coventry and Lady Blanche Craven, and was educated at Eton and the Royal Military College in Camberley. Coventry came to Canada in 1906. In 1910, he married Alice Ward. He was a member of the Royal North-West Mounted Police from 1906 to 1911. Coventry also served in the Canadian Expeditionary Force during World War I. After the war, he served as manager of the Vancouver Island Racing Association. Coventry later returned to England, where he inherited some money following his father's death in 1930. He also served as overseas market representative for the British Columbia government. Coventry appeared in bankruptcy court in London in July 1934 after losing his position as market representative and suffering financial reverses.
