= Robert Henry Neelands =

Canadian politician

MLA for South Vancouver
- In office 1920–1928

Personal details
- Born: July 8, 1881 Grey County, Ontario
- Died: July 24, 1974 (aged 93) Burnaby, British Columbia
- Party: Canadian Labour Party

Robert Henry Neelands (July 8, 1881 – July 24, 1974) was a Canadian politician. He served in the Legislative Assembly of British Columbia from 1920 to 1928 from the electoral district of South Vancouver, as a member of the Canadian Labour Party.
