= Nelson (provincial electoral district) =

Defunct provincial electoral district in British Columbia, Canada

Nelson was the name of a provincial electoral district in the Canadian province of British Columbia. It first appeared on the hustings in the general election of 1916 in place of the former riding of Nelson City. Its last appearance was in the 1928 election. Following redistribution, the Nelson area was combined with the Creston riding to create Nelson-Creston, which first appeared in the 1933 election.

== Electoral history ==
Note: Winners in each election are in bold.

14th British Columbia election, 1916
Party	Candidate	Votes	%	±	Expenditures
Independent Liberal ^{1}	George Bell	125	10.09%		unknown
Liberal	Archie Mainwaring Johnson	507	40.92%		unknown
**Conservative**	**William Oliver Rose**	**607**	**48.99%**		unknown
Total valid votes		1,239	100.00%		
Total rejected ballots					
Turnout		%			
^{1} When identified as a "Socialist" in the election results printed in a Vancouver daily, Bloomer wrote a letter to object and called himself an Independent.

15th British Columbia election, 1920
Party	Candidate	Votes	%	±	Expenditures
Liberal	James O'Shea	763	38.25%		unknown
**Conservative**	**William Oliver Rose**	**1,232**	**61.75%**		unknown
Total valid votes		1,995	100.00%		
Total rejected ballots					
Turnout		%			

16th British Columbia election, 1924
Party	Candidate	Votes	%	±	Expenditures
**Liberal**	**Kenneth Campbell**	**902**	**43.14%**		unknown
Conservative	Charles Forbes McHardy	711	34.00%		unknown
Farmer–Labour	George Turner ²	478	22.86%		unknown
Total valid votes		2,091	100.00%		
Total rejected ballots					
Turnout		%			
² Endorsed by Provincial Party.

17th British Columbia election, 1928
Party	Candidate	Votes	%	±	Expenditures
**Conservative**	**Lorris E. Borden**	**1,338**	**53.07%**		unknown
Liberal	Duncan Daniel McLean	1,183	46.93%		unknown
Total valid votes		2,521	100.00%		
Total rejected ballots		48			
Turnout		%			

The Nelson riding was redistributed after the 1928 election. In the 1933 election the Nelson-Kootenay Lake area was represented by the new riding of Nelson-Creston.

== See also ==
- List of British Columbia provincial electoral districts
- Canadian provincial electoral districts
- List of electoral districts in the Kootenays

Legislative Assembly of British Columbia
Preceded by Victoria City	Constituency represented by the Premier of British Columbia; 1924–1927	Succeeded by Yale
