= John McKie =

Member of the Legislative Assembly of British Columbia
- In office June 1924 – October 29, 1924
- Preceded by: none, first member
- Succeeded by: Dougald MacPherson
- Constituency: Grand Forks-Greenwood

Personal details
- Born: November 16, 1874 Scotland
- Died: October 29, 1924 (aged 49) Farron, British Columbia
- Party: British Columbia Conservative Party
- Occupation: foundry man

John McKie (November 16, 1874 – October 29, 1924) was a Canadian politician. He served in the Legislative Assembly of British Columbia from June 1924 to October 1924 from the electoral district of Grand Forks-Greenwood, a member of the Conservative party. He died in a train explosion on October 29, 1924.
