= Christopher McRae =

Canadian politician (1873–1938)

MLA for Vancouver City
- In office 1924–1928

Personal details
- Born: October 20, 1873 Port Elgin, Ontario, Canada
- Died: January 28, 1938 (aged 64) Vancouver, British Columbia, Canada
- Party: Liberal

Christopher McRae (October 20, 1873 – January 28, 1938) was a Canadian politician. He served in the Legislative Assembly of British Columbia from 1924 to 1928 from the electoral district of Vancouver City, as a Liberal. He was the president and manager of the Alberta Timber Company based in Vancouver.
