= Richard John Burde =

Canadian politician (1871–1954)

MLA for Alberni
- In office 1919–1928

Personal details
- Born: July 29, 1871 Ravenna, Michigan, United States
- Died: December 17, 1954 (aged 83) Port Alberni, British Columbia, Canada
- Party: Liberal
- Occupation: journalist

Richard John Burde (July 29, 1871 – December 17, 1954) was a Canadian politician. He served in the Legislative Assembly of British Columbia from a 1919 byelection until his retirement at the 1928 provincial election, from the electoral district of Alberni, as an Independent Liberal.
