= Samuel Lyness Howe =

Canadian politician (1864–1939)

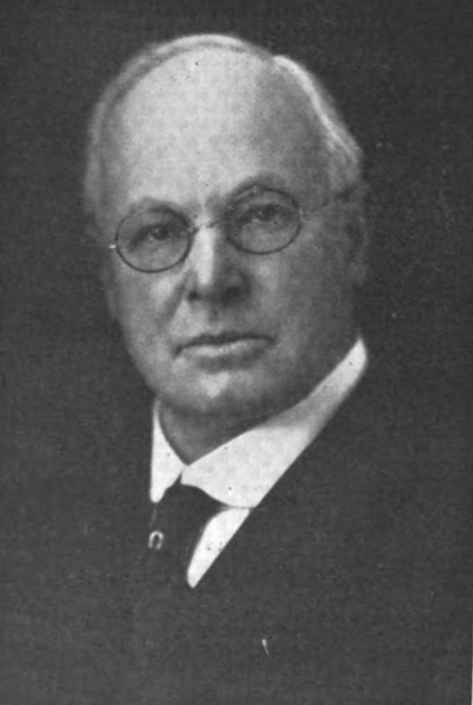

Member of the Legislative Assembly of British Columbia
- In office 1928–1933
- Constituency: Richmond-Point Grey

Personal details
- Born: May 14, 1864 St. Vincent township, Canada West
- Died: February 13, 1939 (aged 74) Vancouver, British Columbia
- Party: Conservative
- Spouse: Arvilla Mary Andrews (m. 1891)
- Occupation: Businessman, politician

Samuel Lyness Howe (May 14, 1864 – February 13, 1939) was a businessman and political figure in British Columbia. After being an unsuccessful candidate in the 1920 and 1924 provincial elections, he represented Richmond-Point Grey in the Legislative Assembly of British Columbia from 1928 to 1933 as a Conservative.

== Biography ==
He was born in St. Vincent township, Grey County, Canada West, the son of Andrew Howe and Margaret Lyness, and was educated at the Ontario College of Pharmacy. In 1891, he married Arvilla Mary Andrews. Howe served five years as reeve of Thornbury, Ontario, and was also reeve of Point Grey, British Columbia. He was a member of the provincial cabinet, serving as Provincial Secretary (1928 to 1933) and as Minister of Mines (1933). During World War I, Howe donated his yacht to the federal government for use in Haida Gwaii. He also donated two horses; one was used by Sir Arthur Currie. He died in Vancouver on February 13, 1939, at the age of 74.

The murals in the rotunda of the province's painted by George Henry Southwell were commissioned by Howe as Provincial Secretary.

Howe Street in Vancouver is named for him.
