= Creston (electoral district) =

Defunct provincial electoral district in British Columbia, Canada

Creston was a provincial electoral district in the Canadian province of British Columbia. It first appeared on the hustings in the general election of 1924 and its last appearance was in the 1928 election. Following redistribution, the area was combined with the Nelson riding to create the new riding of Nelson-Creston in the 1933 election, keeping that name until the 2021 redistribution when was changed to Kootenay Central.

== Electoral history ==
Note: Winners in each election are in bold.

16th British Columbia election, 1924
| Party | Candidate | Votes | % | ± | Expenditures |
|---|---|---|---|---|---|
| Provincial | Annie H. Foster | 397 | 22.57% | – | unknown |
| Conservative | **Fred W. Lister** | **879** | **49.97%** | | unknown |
| Liberal | John Norcross | 483 | 27.46% | – | unknown |
| Total valid votes | | 1,759 | 100.00% | | |
| Total rejected ballots | | | | | |
| Turnout | | % | | | |

17th British Columbia election, 1928
| Party | Candidate | Votes | % | ± | Expenditures |
|---|---|---|---|---|---|
| Conservative | **Fred W. Lister** | **1,184** | **54.76%** | | unknown |
| Liberal | Frank Putnam | 978 | 45.24% | – | unknown |
| Total valid votes | | 2,162 | 100.00% | | |
| Total rejected ballots | | 15 | | | |
| Turnout | | % | | | |

The Creston riding was redistributed after the 1928 election. In the 1933 election the southern Kootenay Lake area was represented by the new riding of Nelson-Creston.

== See also ==
- List of British Columbia provincial electoral districts
- Canadian provincial electoral districts
