= Charles Morgan Kingston =

Canadian politician (1867–1948)

MLA for Grand Forks-Greenwood
- In office 1928–1933

Personal details
- Born: December 27, 1867 West Huntingdon, Ontario
- Died: February 1, 1948 (aged 80) West Vancouver, British Columbia
- Party: Conservative
- Occupation: doctor

Charles Morgan Kingston (December 27, 1867 – February 1, 1948) was a Canadian politician. After being an unsuccessful candidate in a 1925 provincial byelection, he served in the Legislative Assembly of British Columbia from 1928 to 1933 from the electoral district of Grand Forks-Greenwood, as a Conservative. He did not seek a second term in the 1933 provincial election. He was a doctor.
