= William Atkinson (British Columbia politician) =

Canadian politician (1868–1939)

William Atkinson (September 4, 1868 – February 1, 1939) was a political figure in British Columbia. He represented Chilliwack in the Legislative Assembly of British Columbia from 1928 until his retirement at the 1933 provincial election as a Conservative.

He was born in Whitby, Ontario, the son of Joseph Atkinson and Isabella Burns, and was educated in Seaforth. In 1917, Atkinson married Mabel C. Ross. He served in the provincial cabinet as Minister of Agriculture between August 1928 and May 1933. Atkinson died in Chilliwack at the age of 70.
