= Francis Aubrey Browne =

Canadian politician (1878–1953)

Francis Aubrey Browne (12 December 1878 – 22 October 1953) was an English-born accountant and political figure in British Columbia. He represented Burnaby in the Legislative Assembly of British Columbia from 1924 to 1928 as a Canadian Labour Party member.

He was born in London, the son of Henry A. Browne and Elizabeth Ada Hurt, and was educated there. Browne was employed in the grain trade on the London exchange. In 1906, he married Jessie Clara Hollands. Browne came to Canada in 1912. He served as accountant for Burnaby from 1914 to 1925. Browne also was president of the New Westminster Trades and Labour Council. He was defeated when he ran for reelection as an independent Labour Party candidate in 1928. He died in Vancouver at the age of 74.
