= United Farmers of British Columbia =

- Former provincial party
- Founded: 1917
- Dissolved: mid-1930s
- Ideology: Agrarianism; Progressivism; Social Democracy
- Colours: Green

The United Farmers of British Columbia was a union of farmers established in 1917. Unlike some of their sibling United Farmers organizations in other provinces, the United Farmers of British Columbia were never directly incorporated as a full political party in their own right, although two candidates stood under the United Farmers banner in the 1920 provincial election, and the United Farmers subsequently participated in the creation of the Provincial Party of British Columbia.
