= James Fitzsimmons (politician) =

Canadian politician

Member of the Legislative Assembly of British Columbia
- In office 1928–1933
- Preceded by: Charles Sidney Leary
- Succeeded by: Charles Sidney Leary
- Constituency: Kaslo-Slocan

Personal details
- Born: November 9, 1870 Charlottetown, Prince Edward Island
- Died: October 20, 1948 (aged 77) Revelstoke, British Columbia
- Party: British Columbia Conservative Party
- Occupation: Steamship captain (CPR)

James Fitzsimmons (November 9, 1870 – October 20, 1948) was a Canadian politician. He served in the Legislative Assembly of British Columbia from 1928 to 1933 from the electoral district of Kaslo-Slocan, a member of the Conservative Party.
