= Lorris E. Borden =

Canadian politician (1877–1963)

Lorris Elijah Borden (June 20, 1877 – July 19, 1963) was a surgeon and political figure in British Columbia. After being defeated by 28 votes in a 1927 byelection, he represented Nelson in the Legislative Assembly of British Columbia from 1928 until his retirement at the 1933 election as a Conservative.

He was born in Canning, Nova Scotia, in 1877, the son of Benjamin H. Borden and Sarah Cox, and was educated in Kentville and Dalhousie University, Halifax. In 1899, Borden married Neva Zwick. Borden took part in a Canadian government expedition to the Arctic in 1903. During that time, he studied diseases among the Inuit and collected a number of carvings and other artifacts which were donated to the government by his wife after his death. This collection is now stored at the Canadian Museum of Civilization. Borden also served as a major in the Canadian Army Medical Corps. He died on July 19, 1963, in Victoria.

His memoirs were published in 1996 by Edward L. Affleck.
