= Fred W. Lister =

Canadian politician

Fred W. Lister (February 10, 1879 – December 22, 1944) was an English-born fruit rancher and political figure in British Columbia. He represented Kaslo from 1920 to 1924 and Creston from 1924 to 1933 in the Legislative Assembly of British Columbia as a Conservative.

Born in Wigtoft, the son of Frederick Lister and Elizabeth Bower, he was educated in Spilsby, Lincolnshire and came to Canada in 1902. That same year, Lister married Leonora Bailey. He served during the Matabele Rebellion and the Boer War. Lister was the commander of the 102nd Battalion of the Canadian Expeditionary Force during World War I. He was administrator of a soldier settlement known as Camp Lister established after the war; it was later renamed Lister. Lister was defeated when he ran for reelection in the redistributed riding of Nelson-Creston in 1933. He died in Camp Lister at the age of 65.
