= John Andrew Buckham =

Canadian politician (1873–1931)

John Andrew Buckham (April 1, 1873 – October 12, 1931) was a pharmacist and politician in British Columbia, Canada. He represented the riding of Columbia in the Legislative Assembly of British Columbia as a Liberal from 1916 until his death in 1931.

Buckham was born in Kilmaurs, Ontario, the son of George Buckham and Jean C. Young, and was educated in Ottawa and Toronto. In 1900, he married Laura Teresa Kelly. He ran unsuccessfully for a seat in the British Columbia legislature in 1909. He was Speaker of the House from 1924 to 1928. Buckham lived in Golden, and died in Vancouver at the age of 58.
