= William Farris Kennedy =

Canadian politician (1888–1951)

MLA for North Okanagan
- In office 1927–1930

Personal details
- Born: July 2, 1888 Wahoo, Nebraska, United States
- Died: August 10, 1951 (aged 63) Victoria, British Columbia
- Party: Conservative

William Farris Kennedy (July 2, 1888 – August 10, 1951) was a Canadian politician. He served in the Legislative Assembly of British Columbia from a 1927 byelection until his resignation in 1930, from the electoral district of North Okanagan, as a Conservative.
