= Horace Cooper Wrinch =

Canadian doctor and politician

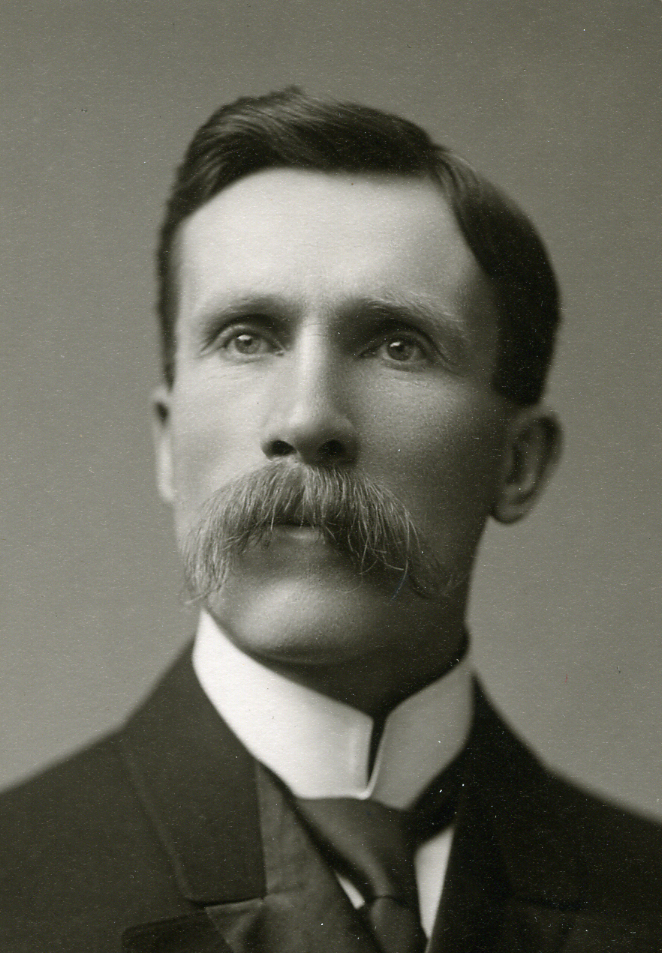
Horace Wrinch on his wedding day, June 16, 1900.

Horace Cooper Wrinch (January 6, 1866 – October 19, 1939) was a pioneer physician on the Skeena River, British Columbia, medical missionary, a public health insurance advocate and political figure. He represented Skeena in the Legislative Assembly of British Columbia from 1924 to 1933 as a Liberal.

== Early years ==
Wrinch was born in Kirby-le-Soken, Essex, received his early education in England at Albert Memorial College (now Framlingham College) and came to Canada on his own in 1880, when he was 14. His family followed him after his father's death in 1881. The Canadian artist Mary Wrinch (1877–1969) was his sister.

Wrinch continued his studies at the St. Francis Agricultural College, in Richmond, Quebec, and then spent approximately ten years farming in Halton County, Ontario. In that time he became a leading lay Methodist for the district and decided to become a medical missionary. After matriculating from Albert College in Belleville, Ontario, he studied medicine at Trinity College, Toronto, then interned at St. Michael's Hospital, also in Toronto.

== Medical missionary ==
Turning down good offers to practice in Toronto, he came out to the Upper Skeena district of Northern British Columbia in 1900 as a medical missionary. On June 16, 1900, a few weeks before leaving Ontario, he married Alice Jane Breckon, herself a teacher, nurse and ardent Methodist. They came first to Kispiox, a Gitxsan village, a dozen miles up the Skeena River from Hazelton, British Columbia. In Kispiox, he was a colleague of Rev. William Pierce.

When Wrinch arrived he was the first resident physician in the interior of Northern British Columbia. This was a time when the only way to reach Hazelton was either by horse or by ship up the coast to Port Essington and then by river steamer up the Skeena. Every year the Skeena River was closed to steamers by ice and weather conditions between October and May. At the time there was no road connection with the south. The Grand Trunk Pacific Railway had not yet arrived.

== Hazelton Hospital ==
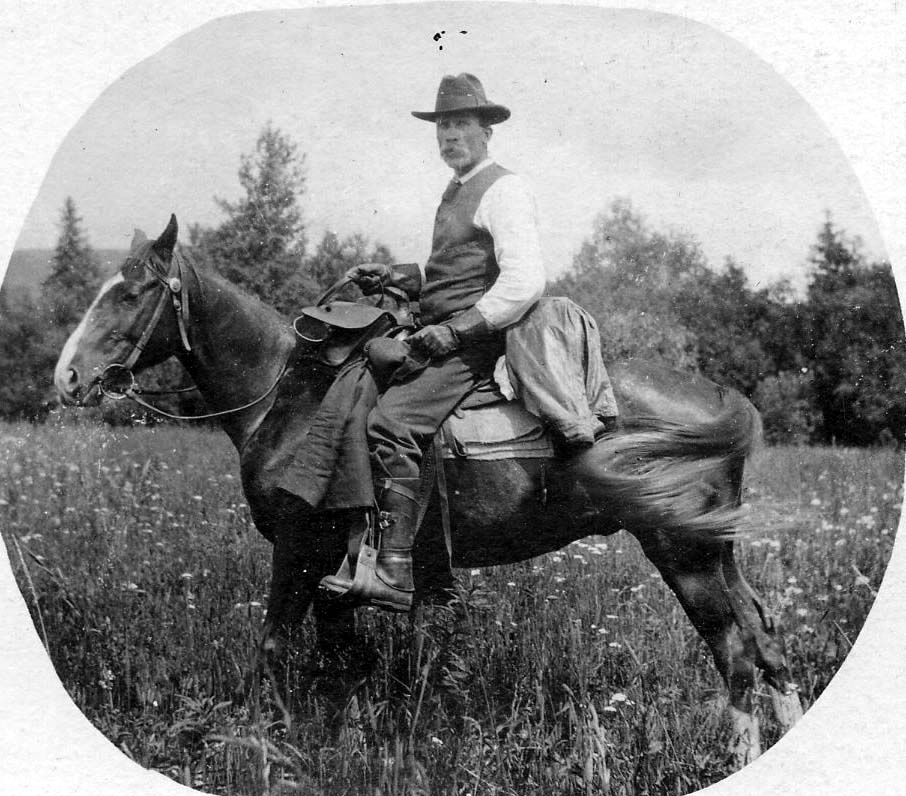
Dr. Wrinch on his rounds in Hazelton.

In 1902 Wrinch and his wife moved to Hazelton and started building a twenty-two-bed hospital on a site acquired by the Methodist Church, doing much of the building himself. The Gitxsan people in Hazelton donated thirty acres for the hospital grounds. While the hospital was being built, Wrinch and his wife took patients into their own home for surgery and convalescence. Opened in 1904, the Hazelton Hospital was the first hospital in the Northern Interior, an area stretching from the coast to Edmonton and from Atlin to the Cariboo. After Wrinch's death in 1939, it was renamed Wrinch Memorial Hospital. In 1905, Wrinch opened a training school for nurses at the hospital in 1905, which operated until the early 1930s, when the Depression led to its closure.

With the Skeena River closed by ice, Wrinch established and run a hospital farm, which supplied food for the patients, staff and the hospital community. The coming of the Grand Trunk Pacific Railway in New Hazelton in 1913 ended the steamboat era on the Skeena River and made travel and obtaining supplies easier. Wrinch also acquired a drugstore in Hazelton—the Up-To-Date Drugstore—and established a second one in New Hazelton.

== Community leader ==
He was a witness to all the important events that occurred in Hazelton between 1900 and 1936. In 1906, for example, he was the first non-Indigenous person on the scene after the first murder, actually on his own land, in the Simon Gunanoot affair. In 1910, Wrinch was ordained a Methodist minister. He was also a magistrate for Hazelton. He was also an entrepreneur in mining projects, being one of the original owners of the Owen Lake Mine. He was well acquainted with Cataline, the famous pack train operator. For many years he was a leader in Hazelton and surrounding communities and was widely liked and respected for his leadership role with the Red Cross during the First World War. He was the medical officer for the district and the only doctor from Terrace to Smithers during the 1918 Spanish flu epidemic.

== Public health insurance advocate and politician ==
Always interested in health insurance, he established a form of health insurance at the Hazelton Hospital in 1907. For one dollar a month (later increased by fifty cents) a subscriber could receive free medical care from the doctor and the hospital. He was one of the founders of the British Columbia Hospital Association in 1918 and served two terms as its president. As president he argued for public health insurance and improved funding for hospitals.

In 1924, Wrinch was persuaded to stand as a Liberal member of the Legislative Assembly and served two terms, retiring in 1933. Although he fought for many progressive measures, including the establishment of the University of British Columbia and better transportation systems in the north, his primary concern was the provision of better health care for British Columbians. During his time in the legislative assembly, he was the leading proponent for provincial health insurance. He proposed it in the legislature in 1927, while on the government benches, and again in 1928, while on the opposition benches. His 1928 proposal received the unanimous consent of the legislature. His proposals were the first in a legislative assembly in Canada. It led to a Royal Commission, which recommended public health insurance. Premier Duff Pattullo implemented a form of public health insurance in the British Columbia in 1936, but when many in the medical profession opposed the program it was allowed to lapse. In 1934, Premier Pattullo appointed Wrinch to his Economic Council to advise his government on economic matters.

== Final Years ==
Wrinch's wife Alice died in 1922. They had five children, one of whom was Major-General Arthur Wrinch (1908–1985). In 1927, Dr. Wrinch married May Hogan, the hospital matron and, after her service in France during the First World War, hospital secretary. Wrinch, who had remained Medical Superintendent of the Hazelton Hospital during his time in politics, retired from that position and the practice of medicine in 1936. After he retired, he and his wife lived in Toronto for a while, but returned to Vancouver where he died on October 19, 1939.
