= George Alexander Walkem =

Canadian politician

G. A. Walkem
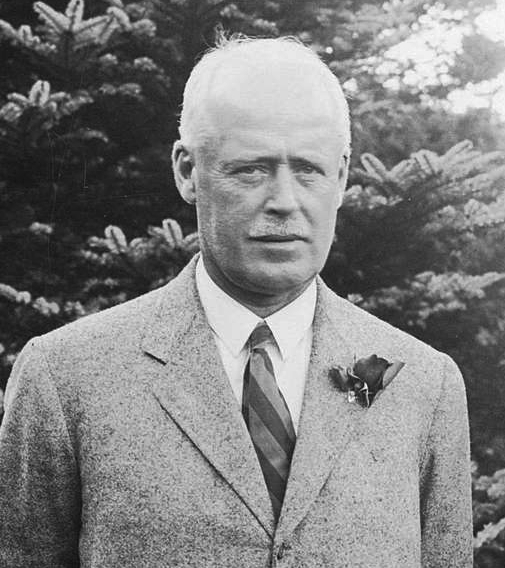
- Walkem pictured c. 1931

MLA for Vancouver City
- In office 1928–1933

Personal details
- Born: July 8, 1872 Kingston, Ontario
- Died: December 13, 1946 (aged 74) Vancouver, British Columbia
- Party: Conservative

George Alexander Walkem (July 8, 1872 – December 13, 1946) was a mechanical engineer, businessman and political figure in British Columbia. He represented Richmond-Point Grey from 1924 to 1928 as a Provincial Party member and Vancouver City from 1928 to 1933 as a Conservative in the Legislative Assembly of British Columbia.

He was born in Kingston, Ontario, the son of Richard Walkem and the former Miss Henderson, and was educated in Kingston and at McGill University. In 1909, he married Mary Collins. Walkem served in the Royal Engineers during World War I. He was reeve of Point Grey from 1923 to 1924. Walkem was president of the Vancouver Machinery Depot Ltd., the Gulf of Georgia Towing Co. and the B.C. Dock Co. He was defeated when he ran for reelection in the riding of Vancouver-Point Grey in 1933 as a member of the Non-Partisan Independent Group. He died in Vancouver at the age of 74.
