= Provincial Party of British Columbia =

Provincial political party in Canada (1923–1924)

The Provincial Party of British Columbia (PROV) was a political party in British Columbia, Canada.

It was formed by a group of British Columbia Conservative Party dissidents known as the "Committee of 100", led and funded by the wealthy General Alexander McRae and political elements from the United Farmers of British Columbia. The United Farmers had little influence over the merged party. The party was formed at a convention in Vernon on January 13, 1923. Sir Charles Hibbert Tupper, another Conservative dissident at the time, was involved to oppose the wild-cat schemes of McBride and Bowser and the unscrupulous government of Oliver.

The party platform sought freight rate equalization, cooperation with the federal government in the development of a northern railway, the elimination of Oriental labour, abolition of patronage, hiring of veterans, the elimination of income tax which had been introduced as a temporary measure during the war.

The party nominated candidates only once, for the 1924 election. In that election, McRae claimed that the Liberal government of John Oliver and the previous administrations of Conservative Premier William John Bowser, then the opposition leader, were corrupt. Many of his allegations were related to the funding of the Pacific Great Eastern Railway plan to reach Prince George in the Northern interior of the province, which was not achieved until many years later. He claimed that there were kickbacks, patronage and various wrongdoings. His allegations were never proven. The election was bitterly fought with sensational allegations against all three leaders.

Although the party achieved 24% of the popular vote in the 1924 election, McRae was not elected. Both Bowser and Oliver lost their seats but Oliver continued to lead his Liberal Party as Premier of a minority government after the election.

McRae reconciled with his former Conservative allies after the election and went on to federal politics. The Provincial Party disappeared.

== Sources ==
- Betty O'Keefe and Ian Macdonald (2001). Merchant Prince. Heritage House: Surrey, BC. ISBN 1-894384-30-X.
- Margaret A. Ormsby (1958). British Columbia: A History. MacMillan: Vancouver.
