= 15th Parliament of British Columbia =

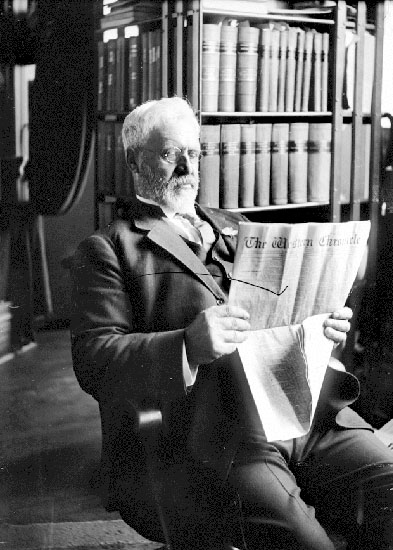
John Oliver

The 15th Legislative Assembly of British Columbia sat from 1921 to 1924. The members were elected in the British Columbia general election held in December 1920. The British Columbia Liberal Party, led by John Oliver, formed the government.

Alexander Malcolm Manson served as speaker until January, 1922, after which Frederick Arthur Pauline succeeded him as speaker.

== Members of the 15th Parliament ==
The following members were elected to the assembly in 1920.:

Member	Electoral district	Party	First elected / previously elected	No.# of term(s)
Richard John Burde	Alberni	Independent	1919	2nd term
Herbert Frederick Kergin	Atlin	Liberal	1920	1st term
John MacKay Yorston	Cariboo	Liberal	1907, 1916	3rd term*
Edward Dodsley Barrow	Chilliwack	Liberal	1916	2nd term
John Andrew Buckham	Columbia	Liberal	1916	2nd term
Thomas Menzies	Comox	People's	1920	1st term
Kenneth Forrest Duncan	Cowichan	Independent	1919	2nd term
James Horace King	Cranbrook	Liberal	1903, 1916	4th term*
Noel Sterling Austin Arnold Wallinger (1922)	Cranbrook	Conservative	1922	1st term
John Oliver (Note: Elected in both Delta and Victoria City; choosing to sit for Victoria City)	Delta	Liberal	1900, (Note: Westminster-Delta) 1916	5th term*
Alexander McDonald Paterson (1921)	Delta	Liberal	1921	1st term
John Alexander Catherwood	Dewdney	Conservative	1920	1st term
Robert Henry Pooley	Esquimalt	Conservative	1912	3rd term
Thomas Aubert Uphill	Fernie	Federated Labour	1920	1st term
Henry George Thomas Perry	Fort George	Liberal	1920	1st term
Ezra Churchill Henniger	Grand Forks	Liberal	1920	1st term
John Duncan MacLean	Greenwood	Liberal	1916	2nd term
Malcolm Bruce Jackson	The Islands	Liberal	1916	2nd term
Frederick William Anderson	Kamloops	Liberal	1916	2nd term
Fred W. Lister	Kaslo	Conservative	1920	1st term
Archibald McDonald	Lillooet	Conservative	1903, 1909	5th term*
William Sloan	Nanaimo	Liberal	1916	2nd term
William Oliver Rose	Nelson	Conservative	1916	2nd term
Kenneth Campbell (1922)	Nelson	Liberal	1922	1st term
Samuel Guthrie	Newcastle	Federated Labour	1920	1st term
David Whiteside	New Westminster	Liberal	1916	2nd term
Kenneth Cattanach MacDonald	North Okanagan	Liberal	1916	2nd term
George Samuel Hanes	North Vancouver	Independent	1916	2nd term
Alexander Malcolm Manson	Omineca	Liberal	1916	2nd term
Thomas Dufferin Pattullo	Prince Rupert	Liberal	1916	2nd term
William Henry Sutherland	Revelstoke	Liberal	1916	2nd term
Thomas Pearson	Richmond	Conservative	1920	1st term
William Kemble Esling	Rossland	Conservative	1920	1st term
Frederick Arthur Pauline	Saanich	Liberal	1916	2nd term
William Alexander McKenzie	Similkameen	Conservative	1918	2nd term
William Hunter	Slocan	Conservative	1907, 1920	4th term*
James William Jones	South Okanagan	Conservative	1916	2nd term
Robert Henry Neelands	South Vancouver	Federated Labour	1920	1st term
James Hargrave Schofield	Trail	Conservative	1907	5th term
William John Bowser	Vancouver City	Conservative	1903	6th term
John Wallace deBeque Farris	Vancouver City	Liberal	1916	2nd term
Malcolm Archibald Macdonald	Vancouver City	Liberal	1916	2nd term
Ian Alistair MacKenzie	Vancouver City	Liberal	1920	1st term
James Ramsay	Vancouver City	Liberal	1920	1st term
Mary Ellen Smith	Vancouver City	Liberal	1918	2nd term
Joseph Badenoch Clearihue	Victoria City	Liberal	1920	1st term
John Hart	Victoria City	Liberal	1916	2nd term
Joshua Hinchcliffe	Victoria City	Conservative	1920	1st term
John Oliver	Victoria City	Liberal	1900, 1916	5th term*
John McRae	Yale	Conservative	1920	1st term

== Party standings ==
Affiliation	Members
Liberal	25
Conservative	15
Independent	3
Federated Labour	3
People's	1
Total	47
Government Majority	3

== By-elections ==
By-elections were held for the following members appointed to the provincial cabinet, as was required at the time:

- Alexander Malcolm Manson, Attorney General and Minister of Labour, acclaimed April 10, 1922
- William Henry Sutherland, Minister of Public Works, elected April 10, 1922

By-elections were held to replace members for various other reasons:

Electoral district	Member elected	Party	Election date	Reason
Delta	Alexander McDonald Paterson	Liberal	February 3, 1921	J. Oliver resigned; elected in both Delta and Victoria City
Nelson	Kenneth Campbell	Liberal	March 22, 1922	W.O. Rose resigned; contested federal seat December 6, 1921
Cranbrook	Noel Sterling Austin Arnold Wallinger	Conservative	August 15, 1922	J.H. King resigned; contested federal seat March 14, 1922

== Other changes ==
- Vancouver City(res. Malcolm Archibald Macdonald October 17, 1921, to contest the 1921 Federal Election)
