= 1916 British Columbia general election =

Canadian provincial election

- September 14, 1916

47 seats of the Legislative Assembly of British Columbia 24 seats needed for a majority
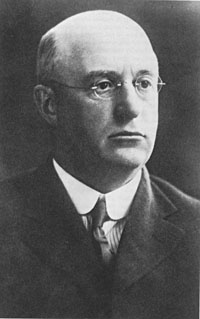

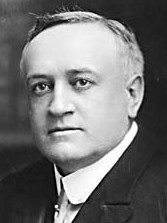
	First party	Second party
Leader	Harlan Carey Brewster	William John Bowser
Party	Liberal	Conservative
Leader since	1912	1915
Leader's seat	Alberni (Note: Brewster was elected as member for both Alberni and Victoria City, and is counted twice.)	Vancouver City
Last election	0	39
Seats won	36	9
Seat change	▲36	▼30
Popular vote	89,892	72,842 (Note: R. McBride (Conservative, Richmond) withdrew before the election but still received 34 overseas votes, which are counted.)
Percentage	50.00%	40.52%
Swing	▲24.63pp	▼19.13pp
Premier before election
William John Bowser
Conservative
Premier after election
Harlan Carey Brewster
Liberal

The 1916 British Columbia general election was the fourteenth general election for the Province of British Columbia, Canada. It was held to elect members of the Legislative Assembly of British Columbia. The election was called on July 5, 1916, and held on September 14, 1916. The new legislature met for the first time on March 1, 1917.

A 1916 Act of the Legislature provided for the life of the Assembly to be extended to five years, and members of the clergy were no longer disqualified from being elected as MLAs.

The Liberal Party defeated the governing Conservative Party, winning 50% of the vote, almost double its share from the previous election. The Liberals won 36 of the 47 seats in the legislature.

The Conservatives' popular vote fell from almost 60% to just over 40%, and took nine seats, forming the Official Opposition.

Two other seats were won by independents, including one Independent Socialist.

Soldiers serving overseas in the First World War were able to vote in the election, and their votes were cast between August 5 and Election Day.

Two referendums were also held on Election Day (concerning Prohibition and women's suffrage), but their results were not announced until later in the year.

== 1915 redistribution of ridings ==
An Act was passed in 1915, providing for an increase in the seats in the Assembly from 42 to 47 upon the next election. The following changes were made:

Abolished ridings	New ridings
Abolition of multi-member district
Cariboo	Cariboo; Fort George; Omineca
Merger of districts
Nelson City; Ymir	Nelson
Division of districts
Okanagan	North Okanagan; South Okanagan
Rossland City	Rossland; Trail
Vancouver City (5 members)	Vancouver City (6 members); North Vancouver; South Vancouver
Renaming of districts
Nanaimo City	Nanaimo
New Westminster City	New Westminster
Skeena	Prince Rupert

== Results ==
Elections to the Legislative Assembly of British Columbia (1916)
Political party	Party leader	MLAs				Votes			
Political party	Party leader	Candidates	1912	1916	±	#	±	%	± (pp)
Liberal	Harlan Brewster	45	–	36	36▲	89,892	68,459▲	50.00	24.63▲
Conservative	William Bowser	46	39	9	30▼	72,842	22,419▲	40.52	19.13▼
Independent		7	–	1	1▲	4,926	3,413▲	2.74	0.95▲
Independent Socialist		3	–	1	1▲	1,321	1,321▲	0.74	New
Independent Conservative		4	1	–	1▼	3,014	1,851▲	1.68	0.31▲
Socialist		4	1	–	1▼	2,106	7,260▼	1.17	9.91▼
Social Democratic		3	1	–	1▼	1,012	391▲	0.56	0.18▼
Independent Labour		2	–	–	–	2,985	2,985▲	1.66	New
Independent Liberal		1	–	–	–	1,518	1,518▲	0.84	New
Independent Progressive		1	–	–	–	158	158▲	0.09	New
Total		116	42	47		179,774		100.00%	

Seats and popular vote by party
Party	Seats	Votes	Change (pp)
█ Liberal	36 / 47	50.00%	24.63
█ Conservative	9 / 47	40.52%	-19.13
█ Socialist	0 / 47	1.17%	-9.91
█ Other	2 / 47	8.31%	4.41

== Results by riding ==
The following MLAs were elected:

Alberni: Harlan Carey Brewster
Atlin: Frank Harry Mobley
Cariboo: John MacKay Yorston
Chilliwhack: Edward Dodsley Barrow
Columbia: John Andrew Buckham
Comox: Hugh Stewart
Cowichan: William Henry Hayward (Ind)
Cranbrook: James Horace King
Delta: Francis James Anderson MacKenzie
Dewdney: John Oliver
Esquimalt: Robert Henry Pooley
Fernie: Alexander Ingram Fisher
Fort George: William Roderick Ross
Grand Forks: James Edwin Wallace Thompson
Greenwood: John Duncan MacLean
The Islands: Malcolm Bruce Jackson
Kamloops: Frederick William Anderson
Kaslo: John Keen
Lillooet: Archibald McDonald
Nanaimo: William Sloan
Nelson: William Oliver Rose
Newcastle: Parker Williams (Ind-Soc)
New Westminster: David Whiteside
North Okanagan: Kenneth Cattanach MacDonald
North Vancouver: George Samuel Hanes
Omineca: Alexander Malcolm Manson
Prince Rupert: Thomas Dufferin Pattullo
Revelstoke: William Henry Sutherland
Richmond: Gerald Grattan McGeer
Rossland: William David Wilson
Saanich: Frederick Arthur Pauline
Similkameen: Lytton Wilmot Shatford
Slocan: Charles Franklin Nelson
South Okanagan: James William Jones
South Vancouver: John Walter Weart
Trail: James Hargrave Schofield
Vancouver City: John Sedgwick Cowper
Vancouver City: John Wallace deBeque Farris
Vancouver City: Malcolm Archibald Macdonald
Vancouver City: John William McIntosh
Vancouver City: Ralph Smith
Vancouver City: William John Bowser
Victoria City: George Bell
Victoria City: Harlan Carey Brewster
Victoria City: Henry Charles Hall
Victoria City: John Hart
Yale: Joseph Walters

=== Synopsis of results ===
Results by riding - 1912 British Columbia general election (single-member districts)
Riding	Winning party						Votes								
Name	1912	Party	Votes	Share	Margin #	Margin %	Lib	Con	Soc	I-Con	I-Soc	SD	Ind	Oth	Total
Alberni	Con	Lib	393	39.26%	38	3.80%	393	355	–	–	–	–	253	–	1,001
Atlin	Con	Lib	329	54.29%	52	8.58%	329	277	–	–	–	–	–	–	606
Cariboo	New	Lib	453	68.64%	246	37.28%	453	207	–	–	–	–	–	–	660
Chilliwhack	Con	Lib	987	55.64%	200	11.28%	987	787	–	–	–	–	–	–	1,774
Columbia	I-Con	Lib	541	66.63%	270	33.26%	541	271	–	–	–	–	–	–	812
Comox	Con	Lib	916	43.07%	34	1.60%	916	882	246	–	–	83	–	–	2,127
Cowichan	Con	Ind	539	56.92%	131	13.84%	408	–	–	–	–	–	539	–	947
Cranbrook	Con	Lib	727	59.06%	223	18.12%	727	504	–	–	–	–	–	–	1,231
Delta	Con	Con	964	51.55%	58	3.10%	906	964	–	–	–	–	–	–	1,870
Dewdney	Con	Lib	927	54.08%	140	8.16%	927	787	–	–	–	–	–	–	1,714
Esquimalt	Con	Con	655	50.08%	2	0.16%	653	655	–	–	–	–	–	–	1,308
Fernie	Con	Lib	903	46.38%	77	3.96%	903	826	218	–	–	–	–	–	1,947
Fort George	New	Con	499	43.43%	7	0.61%	–	499	–	–	492	–	–	158	1,149
Grand Forks	Con	Lib	584	63.62%	250	27.24%	584	334	–	–	–	–	–	–	918
Greenwood	Con	Lib	491	70.55%	286	41.10%	491	205	–	–	–	–	–	–	696
The Islands	Con	Lib	358	50.28%	4	0.56%	358	354	–	–	–	–	–	–	712
Kamloops	Con	Lib	1,519	61.27%	559	22.54%	1,519	960	–	–	–	–	–	–	2,479
Kaslo	Con	Lib	456	54.94%	82	9.88%	456	374	–	–	–	–	–	–	830
Lillooet	Con	Con	296	52.39%	27	4.78%	269	296	–	–	–	–	–	–	565
Nanaimo	SD	Lib	1,137	57.14%	562	28.25%	1,137	575	–	–	278	–	–	–	1,990
Nelson	New	Con	607	48.99%	100	8.07%	507	607	–	–	–	–	125	–	1,239
Newcastle	Soc	I-Soc	551	56.11%	120	12.22%	–	431	–	–	551	–	–	–	982
New Westminster	Con	Lib	1,369	53.58%	183	7.16%	1,369	1,186	–	–	–	–	–	–	2,555
North Okanagan	New	Lib	1,261	57.08%	313	14.16%	1,261	948	–	–	–	–	–	–	2,209
North Vancouver	New	Lib	980	52.80%	382	20.58%	980	598	–	278	–	–	–	–	1,856
Omineca	New	Lib	473	62.16%	185	24.32%	473	288	–	–	–	–	–	–	761
Prince Rupert	Con	Lib	1,062	52.89%	116	5.78%	1,062	946	–	–	–	–	–	–	2,008
Revelstoke	Con	Lib	802	60.62%	281	21.24%	802	521	–	–	–	–	–	–	1,323
Richmond	Con	Lib	1,441	54.07%	252	9.45%	1,441	1,189	–	35	–	–	–	–	2,665
Rossland	Con	Lib	424	55.79%	88	11.58%	424	336	–	–	–	–	–	–	760
Saanich	Con	Lib	1,033	58.53%	301	17.06%	1,033	732	–	–	–	–	–	–	1,765
Similkameen	Con	Con	650	55.41%	127	10.82%	523	650	–	–	–	–	–	–	1,173
Slocan	Con	Lib	448	50.06%	1	0.12%	448	447	–	–	–	–	–	–	895
South Okanagan	New	Con	845	54.52%	140	9.04%	705	845	–	–	–	–	–	–	1,550
South Vancouver	New	Lib	1,579	45.75%	205	5.94%	1,579	1,374	–	–	–	–	–	498	3,451
Trail	New	Con	626	45.56%	142	10.33%	484	626	262	–	–	–	–	–	1,372
Yale	Con	Lib	809	57.05%	200	14.10%	809	609	–	–	–	–	–	–	1,418

= open seat
= turnout is above provincial average
= winning candidate was in previous Legislature
= incumbent had switched allegiance
= previously incumbent in another riding
= not incumbent; was previously elected to the Legislature
= incumbency arose from byelection gain
= other incumbents renominated
= multiple candidates

Results by riding - 1912 British Columbia general election (multiple-member districts)
Party	Vancouver City			Victoria City		
Party	Votes	Share	Change	Votes	Share	Change
Liberal	47,263	49.38%	18.53%	15,772	51.29%	26.17%
Conservative	39,050	40.80%	-13.94%	11,347	36.90%	-30.00%
Independent	2,824	2.95%	1.01%	1,185	3.85%	0.01%
Independent Conservative	2,701	2.82%	New	–	–	–
Independent Labour	2,487	2.60%	New	–	–	–
Socialist	1,380	1.44%	-11.02%	–	–	-4.13%
Independent Liberal	–	–	–	1,518	4.94%	New
Social Democratic	–	–	–	929	3.02%	New
Total	46,285	100.00%		16,034	100.00%	
Seats won	5 1			4		
Incumbents returned	1			–		

== See also ==
- List of British Columbia political parties
