= 1912 British Columbia general election =

Canadian provincial election

- March 28, 1912

42 seats of the Legislative Assembly of British Columbia 22 seats needed for a majority
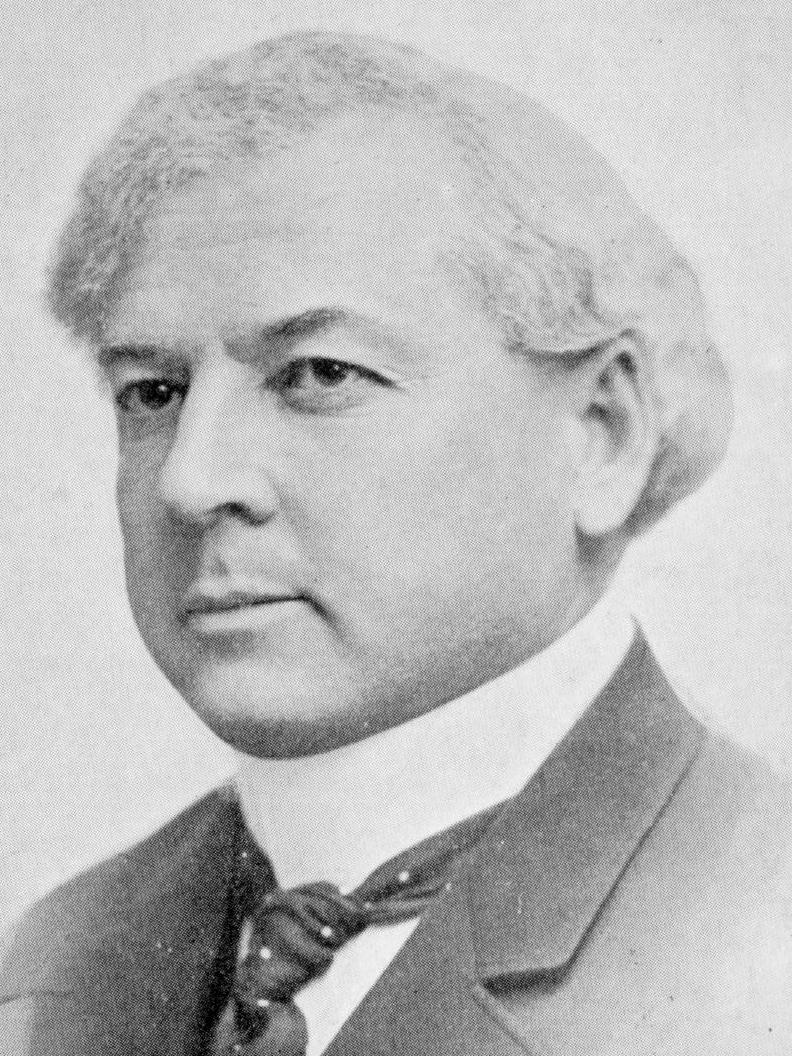

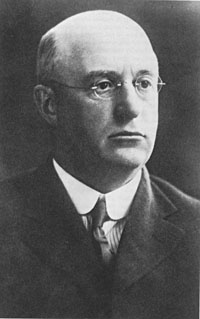
	First party	Second party
		SPC
Leader	Sir Richard McBride	none
Party	Conservative	Socialist
Leader's seat	Victoria City
Last election	38	2
Seats won	39	1
Seat change	▲1	▼1
Popular vote	50,423	9,366
Percentage	59.65%	11.08%
Swing	▲7.32pp	▼0.42pp
	Third party	Fourth party
	SDP
Leader	none	Harlan Carey Brewster
Party	Social Democratic	Liberal
Last election	Did not contest	2
Seats won	1	0
Seat change	▲1	▼2
Popular vote	621	21,443
Percentage	0.74%	25.37%
Swing	new	▼7.84pp
Premier before election
Richard McBride
Conservative
Premier after election
Richard McBride
Conservative

The 1912 British Columbia general election was the thirteenth general election for the Province of British Columbia, Canada. It was held to elect members of the Legislative Assembly of British Columbia. The election was called on February 27, 1912, and held on March 28, 1912. The new legislature met for the first time on January 16, 1913.

The governing Conservative Party increased its share of the popular vote to almost 60%, and swept all but 3 of the 42 seats in the legislature. Of the remaining three, one (Harold Ernest Forster in Columbia) was formally listed as an independent but was a Conservative who had missed the filing date. He campaigned and sat in full support of the McBride government.

The Liberal Party's share of the vote fell from one-third to one-quarter, and it lost both of its seats in the legislature.

The remaining two seats were won by the Socialist Party and the Social Democratic Party in the coal-mining ridings of Nanaimo City and Newcastle.

== Results ==
Elections to the Legislative Assembly of British Columbia (1912)
Political party	Party leader	MLAs				Votes			
Political party	Party leader	Candidates	1909	1912	±	#	±	%	± (pp)
Conservative	Richard McBride	42	38	39	1▲	50,423	2,651▼	59.65%	7.32▲
Socialist		17	2	1	1▼	9,366	2,299▼	11.08%	0.42▼
Independent Conservative		7	–	1	1▲	1,163	1,009▲	1.37%	1.22▲
Social Democratic		1	–	1	1▲	621	621▼	0.74%	New
Liberal	Harlan Carey Brewster	19	2	–	2▼	21,433	12,242▼	25.37%	7.84▼
Independent		2	–	–	–	1,513	1,112▼	1.79%	0.80▼
Total		88	42	42		84,529		100.00%	

Seats and popular vote by party
Party	Seats	Votes	Change (pp)
█ Conservative	39 / 42	59.65%	7.32
█ Liberal	0 / 42	25.37%	-7.34
█ Socialist	1 / 42	11.08%	-0.42
█ Other	2 / 42	3.90%	0.44

== Results by riding ==
The following MLAs were elected:

Alberni: John George Corry Wood
Atlin: Henry Esson Young
Cariboo: Michael Callanan
Cariboo: John Anderson Fraser
Chilliwhack: Samuel Arthur Cawley
Columbia: Harold Ernest Forster (I-Con)
Comox: Michael Manson
Cowichan: William Henry Hayward
Cranbrook: Thomas Donald Caven
Delta: Francis James Anderson MacKenzie
Dewdney: William J. Manson
Esquimalt: Robert Henry Pooley
Fernie: William Roderick Ross
Grand Forks: Ernest Miller
Greenwood: John Robert Jackson
The Islands: Albert Edward McPhillips
Kamloops: James Pearson Shaw
Kaslo: Neil Franklin MacKay
Lillooet: Archibald McDonald
Nanaimo City: John Thomas Wilmot Place
Nelson City: William Ross MacLean
Newcastle: Parker Williams
New Westminster City: Thomas Gifford
Okanagan: Price Ellison
Revelstoke: Thomas Taylor
Richmond: Francis Lovett Carter-Cotton
Rossland City: Lorne Argyle Campbell
Saanich: David McEwen Eberts
Similkameen: Lytton Wilmot Shatford
Skeena: William Manson
Slocan: William Hunter
Vancouver City: Charles William John Bowser
Vancouver City: Alexander Henry Boswell MacGowan
Vancouver City: George Albert McGuire
Vancouver City: Charles Edward Tisdall
Vancouver City: Henry Holgate Watson
Victoria City: Henry Frederick William Behnsen
Victoria City: Frederick Davey
Victoria City: Richard McBride
Victoria City: Henry Broughton Thomson
Yale: Alexander Lucas
Ymir: James Hargrave Schofield

=== Synopsis of results ===
Results by riding - 1912 British Columbia general election (single-member districts)
Riding	Winning party						Votes					
Name	1909	Party	Votes	Share	Margin #	Margin %	Con	Lib	Soc	I-Con	SD	Total
Alberni	Lib	Con	acclaimed									
Atlin	Con	Con	acclaimed									
Chilliwhack	Con	Con	acclaimed									
Columbia	Con	I-Con	282	51.74%	19	3.48%	263	–	–	282	–	545
Comox	Con	Con	694	66.16%	339	32.32%	694	–	355	–	–	1,049
Cowichan	Con	Con	441	80.04%	331	60.08%	441	110	–	–	–	551
Cranbrook	Con	Con	acclaimed									
Delta	Con	Con	748	70.83%	440	41.66%	748	308	–	–	–	1,056
Dewdney	Con	Con	803	80.54%	609	61.08%	803	–	–	194	–	997
Esquimalt	Lib	Con	398	46.50%	212	24.77%	398	151	25	282 (Note: The incumbent John Jardine received 96 votes)	–	856
Fernie	Con	Con	1,067	58.31%	304	16.62%	1,067	–	763	–	–	1,830
Grand Forks	Con	Con	acclaimed									
Greenwood	Con	Con	364	78.11%	262	56.22%	364	–	102	–	–	466
The Islands	Con	Con	345	75.66%	234	51.32%	345	–	–	111	–	456
Kamloops	Con	Con	931	70.11%	534	40.22%	931	397	–	–	–	1,328
Kaslo	Con	Con	acclaimed									
Lillooet	Con	Con	200	71.17%	119	42.34%	200	81	–	–	–	281
Nanaimo City	Soc	SD	621	39.45%	43	2.73%	578	375	–	–	621	1,574
Nelson City	Con	Con	527	59.08%	339	38.00%	527	–	177	188	–	892
Newcastle	Soc	Soc	386	50.86%	13	1.72%	373	–	386	–	–	759
New Westminster City	Con	Con	1,004	72.28%	619	44.56%	1,004	385	–	–	–	1,389
Okanagan	Con	Con	1,388	82.37%	1,091	64.74%	1,388	–	297	–	–	1,685
Revelstoke	Con	Con	acclaimed									
Richmond	Con	Con	acclaimed									
Rossland City	Con	Con	336	56.09%	168	28.04%	336	168	95	–	–	599
Saanich	Con	Con	392	69.01%	216	38.02%	392	176	–	–	–	568
Similkameen	Con	Con	acclaimed									
Skeena	Con	Con	940	51.00%	420	22.79%	940	520	277	106	–	1,843
Slocan	Con	Con	373	65.32%	175	30.64%	373	–	198	–	–	571
Yale	Con	Con	524	65.26%	245	30.52%	524	279	–	–	–	803
Ymir	Con	Con	1,024	79.69%	763	59.38%	1,024	–	261	–	–	1,285

= open seat
= winning candidate was in previous Legislature
= incumbent had switched allegiance
= previously incumbent in another riding
= not incumbent; was previously elected to the Legislature
= incumbency arose from byelection gain
= other incumbents renominated
= multiple candidates

Results by riding - 1912 British Columbia general election (multiple-member districts)
Party	Cariboo			Vancouver City			Victoria City		
Party	Votes	Share	Change	Votes	Share	Change	Votes	Share	Change
Conservative	645	77.99%	14.98%	25,338	54.74%	4.64%	10,727	66.90%	13.48%
Liberal	182	22.01%	-14.98%	14,283	30.86%	-5.42%	4,028	25.12%	-6.57%
Socialist	–	–	–	5,767	12.46%	-1.16%	663	4.13%	0.72%
Independent	–	–	–	897	1.94%	1.94%	616	3.84%	-7.64%
Total	827	100.00%		46,285	100.00%		16,034	100.00%	
Seats won	2			5			4		
Incumbents returned	2			5			4		
Seat change	–			–			–		

== See also ==
- List of British Columbia political parties

== Further reading & references ==
- In the Sea of Sterile Mountains: The Chinese in British Columbia, Joseph Morton, J.J. Douglas, Vancouver (1974). Despite its title, a fairly thorough account of the politicians and electoral politics in early BC.
- Hopkins, J. Castell (1913). The Canadian Annual Review of Public Affairs, 1912. Toronto: The Annual Review Publishing Company.
- Electoral History of British Columbia, 1871–1986 (PDF). Elections BC. 1988. ISBN 0-7718-8677-2.
