= 1920 British Columbia general election =

Canadian provincial election

- December 1, 1920

47 seats of the Legislative Assembly of British Columbia 24 seats needed for a majority
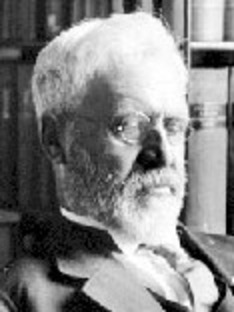

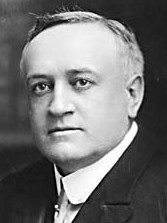
	First party	Second party
Leader	John Oliver	William John Bowser
Party	Liberal	Conservative
Leader's seat	Victoria City (Note: Oliver was also elected as member for Delta, but chose to resign from that seat.)	Vancouver City
Last election	36	9
Seats won	26	14
Seat change	▼10	▲5
Popular vote	134,167	110,475
Percentage	37.89%	31.20%
Swing	▼12.11pp	▼9.32pp
	Third party	Fourth party
	FLP	PP
Party	Federated Labour	People's
Last election	Did not contest	Did not contest
Seats won	3	1
Seat change	▲3	▲1
Popular vote	32,230	1,354
Percentage	9.10%	0.38%
Swing	new	new
Premier before election
John Oliver
Liberal
Premier after election
John Oliver
Liberal

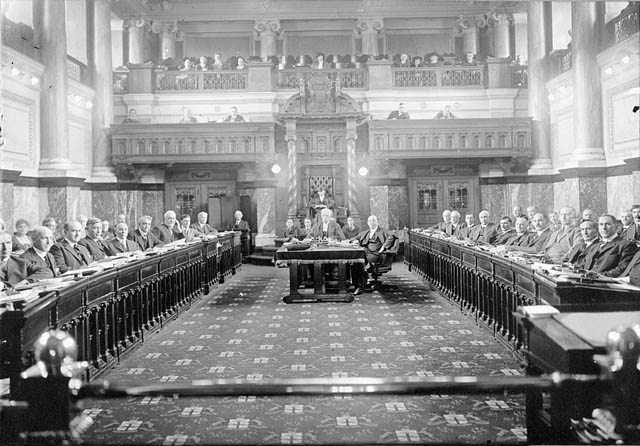
The legislature of British Columbia in session, 1921

The 1920 British Columbia general election was the fifteenth general election for the Province of British Columbia, Canada. It was held to elect members of the Legislative Assembly of British Columbia. The election was called on October 23, 1920, and held on December 1, 1920. The new legislature met for the first time on February 8, 1921.

Although it lost eleven seats in the legislature, and fell from 50% of the popular vote to under 38%, the governing Liberal Party held on to a slim majority in the legislature for its second consecutive term in government.

The Conservative Party also lost a significant share of its popular vote, but won six additional seats for a total of fifteen, and formed the Official Opposition.

Almost a third of the vote and seven seats were won by independents and by a wide variety of fringe parties.

This was the first general election in which women could vote and run for office. Mary Ellen Smith was elected to fill one of the five seats in Vancouver City.

== Results ==
Elections to the 15th Legislative Assembly of British Columbia (1920)
Political party	Party leader	MLAs				Votes			
Political party	Party leader	Candidates	1916	1920	±	#	±	%	± (pp)
Liberal	John Oliver (Note: nominated and won in both Delta and Victoria City. He would opt to resign from the Delta seat.)	45	36	26	10▼	134,167	44,275▲	37.89	12.11▼
Conservative	William Bowser	42	9	14	5▲	110,475	37,633▲	31.20	9.32▼
Independent (Note: Includes candidates from the Liberty League of B.C. (2,466 votes), Vancouver Ratepayers Association (3,291 votes), and Women's Freedom League (4,166 votes).)		18	1	3	2▲	36,736	31,810▲	10.37	7.63▲
Federated Labour (Note: Includes candidates not directly nominated, but supported by, the Federated Labour Party.)		14	–	3	3▲	32,230	32,230▲	9.10	New
People's Party		1	–	1	1▲	1,354	1,354	0.38	New
Independent Socialist		1	1	–	1▼	419	902▼	0.12	0.62▼
Socialist (Note: Includes John Henry Burrough, a Labour candidate in Prince Rupert running on a Socialist Party platform.)		7	–	–	Steady	12,386	10,280▲	3.50	2.33▲
Soldier (Note: Soldier-Farmer candidates ran in rural Districts (five candidates, 3361 votes) and Soldier-Labour candidates ran in urban ones (six candidates, 7419 votes).)		11	–	–	–	10,780	10,780▲	3.04	New
Grand Army of United Veterans (Note: Some GAUV candidates ran on a joint Soldier-Labour ticket.)		2	–	–	–	5,441	5,441▲	1,54	New
Independent Liberal		3	–	–	Steady	3,433	1,915▲	0.97	0.13▲
United Farmers		2	–	–	–	3,178	3,178▲	0.90	New
Independent Conservative		2	–	–	Steady	1,602	1,412▼	0.45	1.23▼
Independent Soldier		2	–	–	–	907	907▲	0.26	New
Independent Farmer		3	–	–	–	526	526▲	0.15	New
Liberal–Conservative		1	–	–	–	424	424▲	0.12	New
Independent Labour		1	–	–	Steady	30	2,955▼	0.01	1.65▼
Total		155	47	47		354,088		100.00%	

Seats and popular vote by party
Party	Seats	Votes	Change (pp)
█ Liberal	26 / 47	37.89%	-12.11
█ Conservative	14 / 47	31.20%	-9.32
█ Federated Labour	3 / 47	9.10%	9.10
█ Independent	3 / 47	10.37%	7.63
█ Soldier/GUAV	0 / 47	4.58%	4.58
█ Socialist	0 / 47	3.50%	2.33
█ Other	2 / 47	3.36%	-2.21

== MLAs elected ==
Alberni: Richard John Burde (Ind)
Atlin: Herbert Frederick Kergin
Cariboo: John MacKay Yorston
Chilliwhack: Edward Dodsley Barrow
Columbia: John Andrew Buckham
Comox: Thomas Menzies (PP)
Cowichan: Kenneth Forrest Duncan (Ind)
Cranbrook: James Horace King
Delta: John Oliver
Dewdney: John Alexander Catherwood
Esquimalt: Robert Henry Pooley
Fernie: Thomas Aubert Uphill (FLP)
Fort George: Henry George Thomas Perry
Grand Forks: Ezra Churchill Henniger
Greenwood: John Duncan MacLean
The Islands: Malcolm Bruce Jackson
Kamloops: Frederick William Anderson
Kaslo: Fred W. Lister
Lillooet: Archibald McDonald
Nanaimo: William Sloan
Nelson: William Oliver Rose
Newcastle: Samuel Guthrie (FLP)
New Westminster: David Whiteside
North Okanagan: Kenneth Cattanach MacDonald
North Vancouver: George Samuel Hanes (Ind)
Omineca: Alexander Malcolm Manson
Prince Rupert: Thomas Dufferin Pattullo
Revelstoke: William Henry Sutherland
Richmond: Thomas Pearson
Rossland: William Kemble Esling
Saanich: Frederick Arthur Pauline
Similkameen: William Alexander McKenzie
Slocan: William Hunter
South Okanagan: James William Jones
South Vancouver: Robert Henry Neelands (FLP)
Trail: James Hargrave Schofield
Vancouver City: John Wallace deBeque Farris
Vancouver City: Malcolm Archibald Macdonald
Vancouver City: Ian Alistair MacKenzie
Vancouver City: James Ramsay
Vancouver City: Mary Ellen Smith
Vancouver City: William John Bowser
Victoria City: Joseph Badenoch Clearihue
Victoria City: John Hart
Victoria City: John Oliver
Victoria City: Joshua Hinchcliffe
Yale: John McRae

=== Synopsis of results ===
Results by riding - 1920 British Columbia general election (single-member districts)
Riding	Winning party						Votes											
Name	1916	Party	Votes	Share	Margin #	Margin %	Lib	Con	FLP	PP	Soc	Sol (Note: Candidates in Esquimalt, New Westminster and Saanich were Soldier-Labour; others were Soldier-Farmer)	UF	I-Lib	I-Con	Ind	Oth	Total
Alberni	Lib	Ind	841	43.94%	166	8.67%	398	–	–	–	–	675	–	–	–	841	–	1,914
Atlin	Lib	Lib	390	36.69%	90	8.47%	390	229	300	–	–	–	–	–	–	114	30	1,063
Cariboo	Lib	Lib	561	61.65%	212	28.30%	561	349	–	–	–	–	–	–	–	–	–	910
Chilliwhack	Lib	Lib	1,911	53.16%	227	6.32%	1,911	1,684	–	–	–	–	–	–	–	–	–	3,595
Columbia	Lib	Lib	584	60.58%	204	21.16%	584	380	–	–	–	–	–	–	–	–	–	964
Comox	Lib	PP	1,354	32.83%	121	2.93%	806	1,233	–	1,354	–	–	–	731	–	–	–	4,124
Cowichan	Ind	Ind	1,145	52.60%	113	5.20%	–	1,032	–	–	–	–	–	–	–	1,145	–	2,177
Cranbrook	Lib	Lib	941	50.98%	36	1.96%	941	–	–	–	–	–	–	–	905	–	–	1,846
Delta	Con	Lib	1,334	37.50%	218	6.13%	1,334	1,116	–	–	–	1,107	–	–	–	–	–	3,557
Dewdney	Lib	Con	1,535	45.45%	166	4.91%	1,369	1,535	473	–	–	–	–	–	–	–	–	3,377
Esquimalt	Con	Con	1,158	49.87%	473	20.37%	685	1,158	–	–	–	479	–	–	–	–	–	2,322
Fernie	Lib	FLP	932	38.37%	158	6.51%	723	774	932	–	–	–	–	–	–	–	–	2,429
Fort George	Con	Lib	1,140	55.18%	353	17.09%	1,140	787	–	–	–	–	–	–	–	–	139	2,066
Grand Forks	Lib	Lib	390	50.39%	6	0.78%	390	384	–	–	–	–	–	–	–	–	–	774
Greenwood	Lib	Lib	392	49.06%	100	12.51%	392	292	–	–	–	–	–	–	–	–	115	799
The Islands	Lib	Lib	581	40.86%	100	7.03%	581	481	–	–	–	360	–	–	–	–	–	1,422
Kamloops	Lib	Lib	1,617	37.43%	209	4.84%	1,617	1,295	–	–	–	–	1,408	–	–	–	–	4,320
Kaslo	Lib	Con	760	50.53%	16	1.06%	744	760	–	–	–	–	–	–	–	–	–	1,504
Lillooet	Con	Con	339	47.48%	126	17.65%	213	339	–	–	–	162	–	–	–	–	–	714
Nanaimo	Lib	Lib	1,370	41.19%	199	5.98%	1,370	785	1,171	–	–	–	–	–	–	–	–	3,326
Nelson	Con	Con	1,232	61.75%	469	23.50%	763	1,232	–	–	–	–	–	–	–	–	–	1,995
Newcastle	I-Soc	FLP	704	42.00%	280	16.7%	–	–	704	–	–	–	–	–	–	–	972 (Note: The incumbent James Hurst Hawthornthwaite (Ind-Soc), elected in a 1918 byelection, and formerly the Socialist MLA for Nanaimo City, came in third with 419 votes.)	1,676
New Westminster	Lib	Lib	1,980	43.07%	369	8.03%	1,980	1,006	–	–	–	1,611	–	–	–	–	–	4,597
North Okanagan	Lib	Lib	2,037	53.51%	267	7.02%	2,037	–	–	–	–	–	1,770	–	–	–	–	3,807
North Vancouver	Lib	Ind	2,681	54.68%	1,501	30.61%	913	1,180	–	–	–	–	–	–	–	2,810 (Note: The incumbent George Samuel Hanes, formerly elected as a Liberal, was the winning candidate with 2,681 votes. His candidacy was endorsed by the local Liberal association and the Great War Veterans Association.)	–	4,903
Omineca	Lib	Lib	630	60.87%	357	34.49%	630	273	–	–	–	–	–	–	–	132	–	1,035
Prince Rupert	Lib	Lib	1,501	43.70%	804	23.41%	1,501	561	–	–	676	–	–	–	697	–	–	3,435
Revelstoke	Lib	Lib	acclaimed															
Richmond	Lib	Con	2,863	37.89%	151	2.00%	2,712	2,863	1,499	–	–	272	–	–	–	210	–	7,556
Rossland	Lib	Con	257	38.02%	18	2.66%	180	257	239	–	–	–	–	–	–	–	–	676
Saanich	Lib	Lib	1,858	39.78%	102	2.19%	1,858	1,756	–	–	–	1,057	–	–	–	–	–	4,671
Similkameen	Con	Con	1,354	51.72%	90	3.44%	1,264	1,354	–	–	–	–	–	–	–	–	–	2,618
Slocan	Lib	Con	568	41.55%	97	7.09%	471	568	328	–	–	–	–	–	–	–	–	1,367
South Okanagan	Con	Con	1,882	56.77%	449	13.54%	1,433	1,882	–	–	–	–	–	–	–	–	–	3,315
South Vancouver	Lib	FLP	3,255	37.75%	811	9.41%	1,969	2,444	3,255	–	–	–	–	–	–	955	–	8,623
Trail	Con	Con	1,315	60.80%	467	21.60%	848	1,315	–	–	–	–	–	–	–	–	–	2,163
Yale	Lib	Con	913	39.58%	176	7.63%	737	913	–	–	–	–	–	657	–	–	–	2,307

= open seat
= winning candidate was in previous Legislature
= incumbent had switched allegiance
= previously incumbent in another riding
= not incumbent; was previously elected to the Legislature
= incumbency arose from byelection gain
= other incumbents renominated
= candidate repudiated by local association
= multiple candidates

Results by riding - 1920 British Columbia general election (multiple-member districts)
Party	Vancouver City			Victoria City		
Party	Votes	Share	Change	Votes	Share	Change
Liberal	78,789	38.96%	-10.42%	19,933	36.96%	-14.33%
Conservative	60,570	29.95%	-10.85%	17,688	32.79%	-4.11%
Federated Labour	22,117	10.97%	New	1,212	2.25%	New
Independent	16,121	7.97%	5.02%	4,485	8.32%	4.46%
Socialist	11,710	5.79%	4.35%	–	–	-4.13%
Grand Army of United Veterans	5,441	2.69%	New	–	–	–
Women's Freedom League	4,166	2.06%	New	–	–	–
Vancouver Ratepayers Association	3,291	1.63%	New	–	–	–
Soldier–Labour	–	–	–	5,329	9.88%	New
Liberty League of BC	–	–	–	2,466	4.57%	New
Independent Liberal	–	–	–	2,045	3.79%	-1.14%
Independent Soldier	–	–	–	778	1.44%	New
Independent Conservative	–	–	-2.82%	–	–	–
Independent Labour	–	–	-2.60%	–	–	–
Social Democratic	–	–	–	–	–	-3.02%
Total	202,205	100.00%		53,936	100.00%	
Seats won	5 1			3 1		
Incumbents returned	3 1			1		

== See also ==
- List of British Columbia political parties
