= Greenwood (British Columbia electoral district) =

Defunct provincial electoral district in British Columbia, Canada

Greenwood was the name of a provincial electoral district in the Canadian province of British Columbia. It was located in there Boundary Country west of Grand Forks around the city of Greenwood. It first appeared on the hustings in the large redistribution prior to the 1903 election. For the 1924 election it was merged with the Grand Forks riding to form Grand Forks-Greenwood.

== Geography and history ==
When the Greenwood riding was formed the Boundary and Slocan mining districts were booming and Greenwood was not a city in name only. Like other ridings in the West Kootenay created in advance of the 1903 election out of the West Kootenay South, during the glory days of the Kootenay and Boundary silver and galena booms. Slocan, Kaslo, Rossland, Grand Forks, Nelson City, Ymir, and other ridings were also created at this time out of the former West Kootenay South.

The need for extra ridings ended when the mining era did, and so as the population of Greenwood and neighbouring towns dwindled the Greenwood riding made its last appearance in the 1924 election and was merged with Grand Forks riding into Grand Forks-Greenwood.

Grand Forks-Greenwood remained on the hustings until 1966 when even lower populations resulted in a merger with the valley of the Similkameen River, also a mining district in decline and represented by Similkameen, which was combined with the smelter and railway towns of the Grand Forks-Greenwood area and the southern end of the Okanagana to form the new riding of Boundary-Similkameen.

== Notable MLAs ==
- Bill Barlee, BC historian, TV host, and folk pundit (ret.)

== Electoral history ==
Note: Winners in each election are in bold.

10th British Columbia election, 1903
Party	Candidate	Votes	%	±	Expenditures
**Liberal**	**John Robert Brown ^{1}**	**238**	**36.73%**		unknown
Socialist	Robert Low Drury	229	35.34%	–	unknown
Conservative	James Ernest Spankie	181	27.93%		unknown
Total valid votes		648	100.00%		
Total rejected ballots					
Turnout		%			
The Vancouver Province newspaper gave 380, 332, and 265 respectively.

11th British Columbia election, 1907
Party	Candidate	Votes	%	±	Expenditures
Socialist	Edgar William Dynes	176	30.19%	–	unknown
**Liberal**	**George Ratcliffe Naden**	**217**	**37.22%**		unknown
Conservative	Edward George Warren	190	32.59%		unknown
Total valid votes		583	100.00%		
Total rejected ballots					
Turnout		%			
^{8} Sixteenth Premier of British Columbia.

12th British Columbia election, 1909
Party	Candidate	Votes	%	±	Expenditures
Socialist	George Heatherton	204	33.01%	–	unknown
**Conservative**	**John Robert Jackson**	**260**	**42.07%**		unknown
Liberal	Alexander MacDonald	154	24.92%		unknown
Total valid votes		618	100.00%		
Total rejected ballots					
Turnout		%			

13th British Columbia election, 1912
Party	Candidate	Votes	%	±	Expenditures
Socialist	George Heatherton	102	21.89%	–	unknown
**Conservative**	**John Robert Jackson**	**364**	**78.11%**		unknown
Total valid votes		466	100.00%		
Total rejected ballots					
Turnout		%			

14th British Columbia election, 1916
Party	Candidate	Votes	%	±	Expenditures
Conservative	John Robert Jackson	205	29.45%		unknown
**Liberal**	**John Duncan MacLean**	**491**	**70.55%**		unknown
Total valid votes		696	100.00%		
Total rejected ballots					
Turnout		%			

1920 British Columbia general election
Party	Candidate	Votes	%
Liberal	John Duncan MacLean	392	49.06
Conservative	George Bell	292	36.55
Independent Farmer	George Henry Pitman	115	14.39
Total valid votes		799	100.00

== See also ==
- List of electoral districts in the Kootenays
- List of British Columbia provincial electoral districts
- Canadian provincial electoral districts
