= Grand Forks (electoral district) =

Defunct provincial electoral district in British Columbia, Canada

Grand Forks was the name of a provincial electoral district in the Canadian province of British Columbia centred on the town of Grand Forks, in the Boundary Country between the Okanagan and Kootenay Countries. The riding first appeared as the result of a redistributing of the former West Kootenay (south riding) which also created Greenwood, Rossland City, Nelson City, and Ymir (electoral district) in 1903. In 1924, the area of the Grand Forks riding was merged with that of the Greenwood riding to create Grand Forks-Greenwood. The area is currently represented by West Kootenay-Boundary.

== Electoral history ==
Note: Winners in each election are in bold.

10th British Columbia election, 1903
Party	Candidate	Votes	%	±	Expenditures
Liberal	William Henry Clement	173	23.04		
Conservative	**George Arthur Fraser**	**346**	**46.07%**		
Socialist	John Riordan	232	30.89%		
Total valid votes		751	100.00%		

11th British Columbia election, 1907
Party	Candidate	Votes	%	±	Expenditures
Liberal	Herbert Watson Gregory	160	21.68%		unknown
Socialist	**John McInnis**	**323**	**43.77%**	–	unknown
Conservative	Ernest Miller	255	34.55%		unknown
Total valid votes		738	100.00%		
Total rejected ballots					
Turnout		%			

12th British Columbia election, 1909
Party	Candidate	Votes	%	±	Expenditures
Socialist	John McInnis	334	33.40%	–	unknown
Conservative	**Ernest Miller**	**516**	**51.60%**		unknown
Liberal	Daniel Patterson	150	15.00%		unknown
Total valid votes		1,000	100.00%		
Total rejected ballots					
Turnout		%			

13th British Columbia election, 1912
Party	Candidate	Votes	%	±	Expenditures
Conservative	**Ernest Miller**	**Accl.**	-.- %		unknown
Total valid votes		-	-.-%		
Total rejected ballots					
Turnout		%			

14th British Columbia election, 1916
Party	Candidate	Votes	%	±	Expenditures
Conservative	Ernest Miller	334	36.38%		unknown
**Liberal**	**James Edwin Wallace Thompson**	**584**	**63.62%**		unknown
Total valid votes		918	100.00%		
Total rejected ballots					
Turnout		%			

15th British Columbia election, 1920
Party	Candidate	Votes	%	±	Expenditures
**Liberal**	**Ezra Churchill Henniger**	**390**	**50.39%**		unknown
Conservative	John McKie	384	49.61%		unknown
Total valid votes		774	100.00%		
Total rejected ballots					
Turnout		%			

== See also ==
- List of British Columbia provincial electoral districts
- Canadian provincial electoral districts
- Kootenay (electoral districts)
