= Roy Walter Alward =

Canadian politician (1877–1959)

Member of the Legislative Assembly of British Columbia
- In office 1931–1933
- Preceded by: Frederick Parker Burden
- Succeeded by: Henry George Thomas Perry
- Constituency: Fort George

Personal details
- Born: September 20, 1877 Queens County, New Brunswick
- Died: June 19, 1959 (aged 81) Vancouver, British Columbia
- Party: British Columbia Conservative Party
- Occupation: Dentist

Roy Walter Alward (September 20, 1877 – June 19, 1959) was a Canadian politician. He served in the Legislative Assembly of British Columbia from a 1931 byelection to the 1933 general election from the electoral district of Fort George, a member of the Conservative party. He was defeated in the 1933 provincial election when he sought re-election as a member of the Non Partisan Independent Group.
