= John McInnis (British Columbia politician) =

Canadian politician (1879 – 1972)

Member of the Legislative Assembly of British Columbia
- In office 1907–1909
- Preceded by: George Arthur Fraser
- Succeeded by: Ernest Miller
- Constituency: Grand Forks
- In office 1945–1949
- Preceded by: Henry George Thomas Perry
- Succeeded by: Henry Robson Bowman
- Constituency: Fort George

Personal details
- Born: June 25, 1879 Springton, Prince Edward Island
- Died: March 23, 1972 (aged 92) Prince George, British Columbia
- Party: Socialist Party of Canada; CCF

John McInnis (1879 – 1972) was a miner, business owner and MLA in British Columbia. He represented Grand Forks from 1907 to 1909 as a Socialist Party member. He later represented Fort George from 1945 to 1949 as a Co-operative Commonwealth Federation (CCF) Member of the Legislative Assembly of British Columbia.

McInnis was born on June 25, 1879, in Springton, Prince Edward Island, and was educated there. McInnis came to British Columbia at the age of 20. He worked as a carpenter and miner at Phoenix and Greenwood from 1900 to 1910. McInnis was defeated when he ran for reelection in 1909.

He then established a lumber business based in Prince George.

McInnis ran unsuccessfully for the Cariboo federal seat in 1935 and for the Grand Forks seat in the provincial assembly in 1916 and again in 1937 before being elected in 1945. He was defeated when he ran for reelection in 1949 and 1952. On March 23, 1972, McInnis died in Prince George at the age of 92.

John McInnis Jr. Secondary School was named in his honour.
