= Rossland =

Rossland may refer to:

== Places ==
- Rossland, British Columbia, British Columbia, Canada
  - Rossland City, provincial electoral district around Rossland, British Columbia (1903–1912)
  - Rossland (electoral district), provincial electoral district around Rossland, British Columbia (1916–1920)
  - Rossland-Trail, provincial electoral district around Rossland, British Columbia (1924–1963)
- Rossland Range, a subrange of the Monashee Mountains of the Columbia Mountains in British Columbia, Canada
- Rossland, Pennsylvania, United States
- Rossland, Renfrewshire, Scotland
- Rossland, Norway, a village in Alver municipality in Vestland county, Norway

== Other uses ==
- Rossland (sternwheeler), a sternwheel steamboat that ran on the Arrow Lakes in British Columbia
