= William Davidson (British Columbia politician) =

Canadian politician

MLA for Slocan
- In office 1903–1907
- Succeeded by: William Hunter

Personal details
- Born: November 17, 1867 Aberdeenshire, Scotland
- Party: Socialist Party of British Columbia
- Spouse: Bridget Walsh (m. 1900)
- Occupation: miner

William Davidson (November 17, 1867 – after 1912) was a Scottish-born miner and political figure in British Columbia. He represented Slocan in the Legislative Assembly of British Columbia from 1903 to 1907.

He was born in Aberdeenshire in 1867, the son of Andrew Davidson, and was educated in New Brunswick. In 1900, Davidson married Bridget Walsh. He was nominated as a candidate by the Slocan Labour Party, which was based on the 1902 Provincial Progressive Party and also supported by the Socialists. In the provincial assembly, Davidson aligned himself with the Socialist members Parker Williams and James Hurst Hawthornthwaite. Because Premier Richard McBride only held a slim majority in the assembly, he often required support from the Socialists, which meant that they were able to push for progressive legislation, such as the eight-hour work day for miners, in the province. Davidson was defeated when he ran for reelection in 1907 and again in 1912.
