= James Alexander MacDonald =

Canadian lawyer, judge and politician

Leader of the Opposition of British Columbia
- In office October 19, 1903 – October 10, 1909
- Preceded by: Unclear; non-partisan democracy
- Succeeded by: John Oliver

Leader of the British Columbia Liberal Party
- In office October 19, 1903 – October 10, 1909
- Preceded by: Joseph Martin (unofficial)
- Succeeded by: John Oliver

Administrator of the Government of British Columbia
- In office December 12, 1920 – December 24, 1920
- Premier: John Oliver
- Preceded by: Edward Gawler Prior (as lieutenant governor)
- Succeeded by: Walter Cameron Nichol (as lieutenant governor)

Member of the Legislative Assembly for Rossland City
- In office October 3, 1903 – November 25, 1909
- Preceded by: New riding
- Succeeded by: William Robert Braden

Personal details
- Born: October 1958
- Died: December 20, 1939 (aged 81)
- Party: Liberal

James Alexander MacDonald (October 1858 – December 20, 1939) was a lawyer, judge and political figure in British Columbia. He represented Rossland City in the Legislative Assembly of British Columbia from 1903 to 1909 as a Liberal. MacDonald was the first leader of the British Columbia Liberal Party, serving from 1903 until 1909.

He was born in Huron County, Canada West and was educated in Stratford, Ontario, at the University of Toronto and at Osgoode Hall. MacDonald first set up practice in Toronto in 1890 and then moved to Rossland, British Columbia in 1896. He married Mary Richardson. In 1909, he was named Chief Justice in the British Columbia Court of Appeal. MacDonald served as Chief Justice of the British Columbia Supreme Court from 1929 until his retirement in 1937. He died two years later in Victoria at the age of 81.
