= John R. Brown =

John R. Brown may refer to:

- John Robert Brown (British Columbia politician) (1862–1947), Canadian politician
- John Robert Brown (judge) (1909–1993), member of the U.S. Court of Appeals for the Fifth Circuit
- John Robert Brown (Virginia politician) (1842–1927), U.S. representative
- John Ronald Brown (1922–2010), unlicensed United States sex-change operation surgeon
