= Francis William Henry Giolma =

Canadian politician

Francis William Henry Giolma (April 28, 1878 – July 4, 1968) was an English-born journalist and political figure in British Columbia. He represented Victoria City in the Legislative Assembly of British Columbia from 1918 to 1920 as a member of the Soldier Party.

He was born in Chatham, Kent, the son of Alfred Francis Giolma and the former Miss Buchanan, and was educated in Canterbury. In 1904, he married Jane Mary Stanton. Giolma came to Canada in 1905. He served as a private in the Canadian Expeditionary Force during World War I. Giolma was elected to the assembly in a 1918 by-election held following the death of Harlan Carey Brewster. He was defeated when he ran for reelection in 1920. Giolma died in Victoria at the age of 90.
