= Alf Nunweiler =

Canadian politician (born 1930)

Allan Alfred Nunweiler
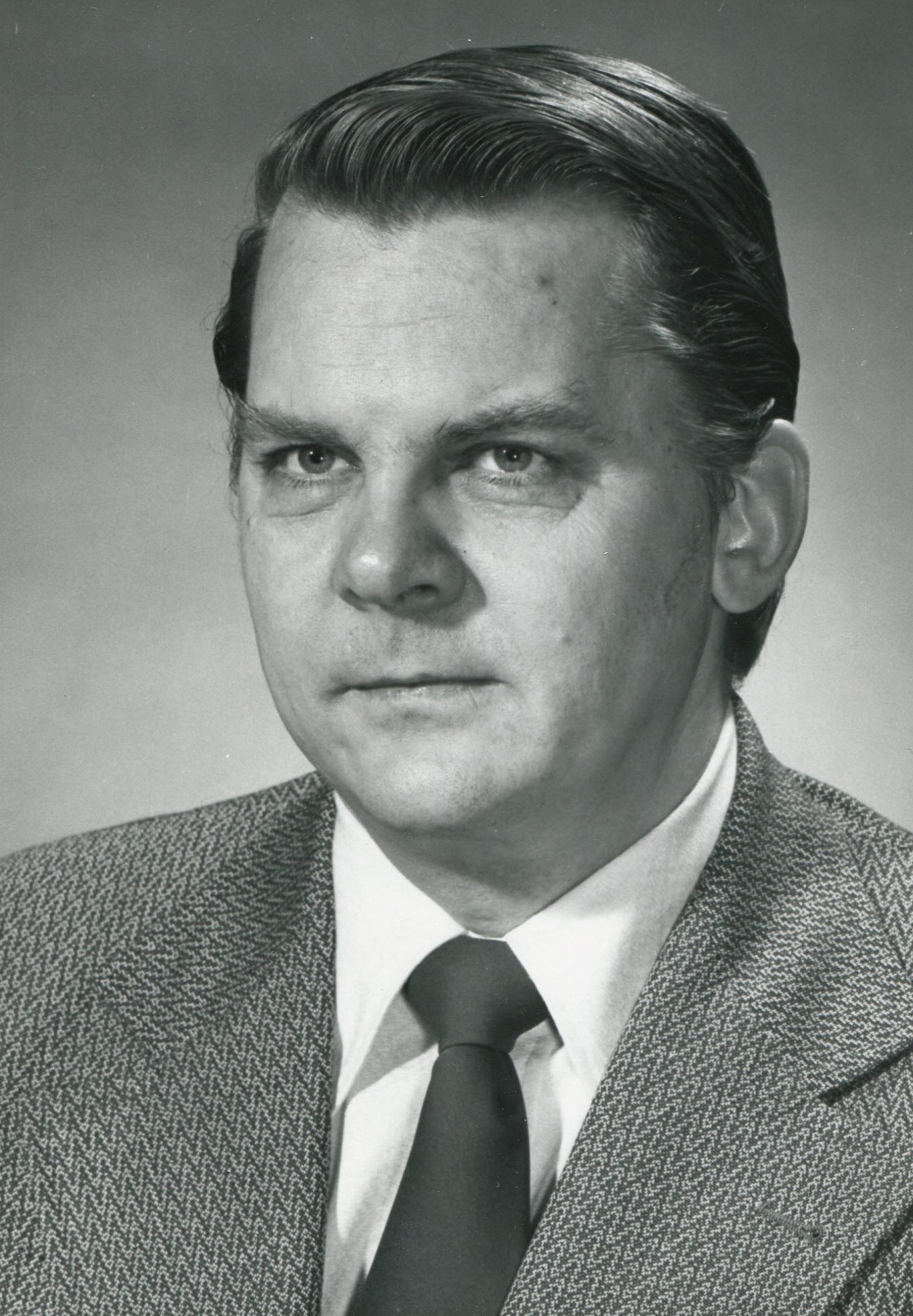

Member of the British Columbia Legislative Assembly for Fort George
- In office August 30, 1972 – December 11, 1975
- Preceded by: Ray Gillis Williston
- Succeeded by: Howard John Lloyd

Personal details
- Born: December 7, 1930 (age 95) Eatonia, Saskatchewan, Canada
- Party: New Democratic

Allan Alfred Nunweiler (born December 7, 1930) is a Canadian former politician. He served in the Legislative Assembly of British Columbia from 1972 to 1975, as a NDP member for the constituency of Fort George. He served in the provincial cabinet as Minister without Portfolio from June 25, 1974 to December 22, 1975.

Nunweiler worked as a dispatcher on the CN line from Jasper, Alberta to Prince George, British Columbia for 33 years.
