= William David Willson =

Canadian politician

MLA for Rossland
- In office 1916–1920

Personal details
- Born: April 27, 1865 Milton, Canada West
- Died: March 4, 1932 (aged 66) Rossland, British Columbia
- Party: British Columbia Liberal Party
- Spouse(s): Sophia Catherine Peterson (m. 1918–1932; his death)

William David Willson (April 27, 1865 – March 4, 1932) was a political figure in British Columbia. He represented Rossland from 1916 until his retirement at the 1920 provincial election in the Legislative Assembly of British Columbia as a Liberal.

He was the son of David William Willson and the former Sarah Ann Flett, having been born in 1865 in Milton, Canada West. Willson was mayor of Rossland from 1914 to 1916. He ran unsuccessfully for the Rossland City seat in the provincial assembly in a 1916 by-election held after Lorne Argyle Campbell was named to cabinet. Willson defeated Campbell in the general election held later that year. He died at Rossland in 1932.
