= Frederick Parker Burden =

Canadian politician (1874–1971)

Member of the Legislative Assembly of British Columbia
- In office 1928–1930
- Preceded by: Henry George Thomas Perry
- Succeeded by: Roy Walter Alward
- Constituency: Fort George

Personal details
- Born: December 28, 1874 York County, New Brunswick
- Died: January 21, 1971 (aged 96) Kelowna, British Columbia
- Party: British Columbia Conservative Party
- Spouse: Jane Burgess Payson
- Occupation: land surveyor

Frederick Parker Burden (December 28, 1874 – January 21, 1971) was a land surveyor and political figure in British Columbia. He represented Fort George in the Legislative Assembly of British Columbia from 1928 to 1930 as a Conservative.

He was born in York County, New Brunswick, the son of Stephen P. Burden and Ruth Ann Hagerman and was educated in Fredericton and at the University of New Brunswick. In 1908, he married Jane Burgess Payson. Burden was an unsuccessful candidate for a seat in the provincial assembly in 1924, losing to Henry George Thomas Perry. He defeated Perry in 1928. Burden served in the provincial cabinet as Minister of Lands. He resigned his seat in the assembly on June 27, 1930; his appointment as Agent-General for British Columbia was announced in late October 1930. He was an unsuccessful candidate for the Conservative Party in the 1937 election in the riding of Fort George.

The book Garibaldi Park: a wonderland of majestic mountains, mighty glaciers, emerald lakes and flower-clad alplands near Vancouver, British Columbia was published in 1929 by the Department of Lands with Burden listed as author.
