= Llewellyn Leslie King =

Canadian politician (1909–2000)

Member of the Legislative Assembly of British Columbia
- In office 1952–1953
- Preceded by: Henry Robson Bowman
- Succeeded by: Ray Gillis Williston
- Constituency: Fort George

Personal details
- Born: April 8, 1909 Vanscoy, Saskatchewan
- Died: July 29, 2000 (aged 91) Saanichton, British Columbia
- Party: British Columbia Social Credit Party
- Spouse: Marta Margaret Grinde
- Children: 4
- Occupation: retail merchant

Llewellyn Leslie King (April 8, 1909 – July 29, 2000) was a Canadian politician. He served in the Legislative Assembly of British Columbia from 1952 to 1953 for the electoral district of Fort George, a member of the Social Credit party.
