= Charles F. Nelson =

Canadian politician

MLA for Slocan
- In office 1916–1920
- Preceded by: William Hunter
- Succeeded by: William Hunter

Personal details
- Born: March 11, 1872 Hastings, Ontario
- Died: November 1, 1940 (aged 68) New Denver, British Columbia
- Party: Liberal Party of British Columbia
- Spouse: Isabel Cuddie (m. 1903, d. 1906)
- Occupation: druggist, photographer

Charles Franklyn Nelson (March 11, 1872 – November 1, 1940) was a Canadian politician. He served in the Legislative Assembly of British Columbia from 1916 to 1920 as a Liberal member for the constituency of Slocan. He won his seat in the assembly by defeating incumbent William Hunter in the 1916 British Columbia general election by one vote (448 to 447). Hunter subsequently beat him in the 1920 provincial election by 97 votes. Nelson lived in New Denver, British Columbia and was a druggist and photographer. He died of heart disease in 1940 at the age of 68.
