= Richard Pateman Wallis =

Canadian politician (1867–1918)

Member of the Legislative Assembly of British Columbia
- In office January 1918 – October 1918
- Preceded by: Harlan Carey Brewster
- Succeeded by: Richard John Burde
- Constituency: Alberni

Personal details
- Born: July 30, 1867 Peterborough, England
- Died: October 14, 1918 (aged 51) Moncton, New Brunswick
- Party: British Columbia Conservative Party
- Spouse: Eliza Mary Marriott
- Children: 1

Richard Pateman Wallis (July 30, 1867 – October 14, 1918) was a Canadian politician. He served in the Legislative Assembly of British Columbia from January to October 1918 for the electoral district of Alberni, a member of the Conservative party. He died in office of pneumonia.
