= Trail (electoral district) =

Defunct provincial electoral district in British Columbia, Canada

Trail was the name of a provincial electoral district of British Columbia, Canada, located in the West Kootenay region. It is named after the town of Trail. It made its first appearance on the hustings in the election of 1916. Its predecessor riding was Rossland City (1903–1912) and from 1924 it was succeeded by the riding of Rossland-Trail.

== Electoral history ==
Note: Winners of each election are in bold.

14th British Columbia election, 1916
Party	Candidate	Votes	%	±	Expenditures
Socialist	Albert Goodwin	262	19.07%	–	unknown
Conservative	**James Hargrave Schofield**	**626**	**45.56%**		unknown
Liberal	Michael H. Sullivan	484	35.23%		unknown
Total valid votes		1,372	100.00%		
Total rejected ballots					
Turnout		%			

15th British Columbia election, 1920
Party	Candidate	Votes	%	±	Expenditures
Liberal	Joseph Stephen Deschamps	848	39.20%		unknown
Conservative	**James Hargrave Schofield**	**1,315**	**60.80%**		unknown
Total valid votes		2,163	100.00%		
Total rejected ballots					
Turnout		%			

Redistribution following the 1920 election resulted in the merger of the Trail riding with the adjacent Rossland riding to form Rossland-Trail for the 1924 election. That riding lasted until 1996. The riding currently representing this area is West Kootenay-Boundary.

== See also ==
- List of British Columbia provincial electoral districts
- Canadian provincial electoral districts
- List of electoral districts in the Kootenays
