= Ray Gillis Williston =

Canadian politician

Member of the Legislative Assembly of British Columbia
- In office 1953–1972
- Preceded by: Llewellyn Leslie King
- Succeeded by: Alf Nunweiler
- Constituency: Fort George

Personal details
- Born: January 17, 1914 Victoria, British Columbia
- Died: December 7, 2006 (aged 92) Sechelt, British Columbia
- Party: British Columbia Social Credit Party
- Spouse: Gladys Edna McInnes Leroy Keyowski
- Occupation: educator

Ray Gillis Williston (January 17, 1914 – December 7, 2006) was an educator and political figure in British Columbia. He represented Fort George in the Legislative Assembly of British Columbia from 1953 to 1972 as a Social Credit member.

He was born in Victoria, British Columbia, the son of Hubert Haines Williston and Islay McCalman, and was educated at the University of British Columbia and the provincial normal school in Victoria. In 1939, Williston married Gladys Edna McInnes. He served in the Royal Canadian Air Force during World War II. Williston was a school principal and was the school inspector for the Prince George/Peace River area from 1945 to 1953.

He served in the provincial cabinet as Minister of Education from 1954 to 1956 and as Minister of Lands, Forests and Water Resources (initially called Minister of Lands and Forests) from 1956 to 1972. Williston was defeated when he ran for reelection in 1972. He represented the province in the negotiation of the Columbia River Treaty with the United States in 1961. After leaving politics, he was general manager of the New Brunswick Forest Authority and then president of British Columbia Cellulose Company. Williston also worked as a consultant for the Canadian International Development Agency and the United Nations Food and Agriculture Organization. Some time after the death of his first wife, he married Eileen, the widow of a friend; she died in 1996. Williston died in St. Mary's Hospital in Sechelt at the age of 92.

Williston Lake, a reservoir in northern British Columbia, was named after him. Williston is the great grandfather of NHL player Macklin Celebrini.

His wife Eileen with Betty Keller produced the book Forests, Power and Policy: The Legacy of Ray Williston ISBN 0-920576-69-9 which was published in 1997.
