= Mount Pauline =

Mountain in Alberta and British Columbia, Canada

- Location within Alberta Location within British Columbia Location within Canada

Highest point
- Elevation: 2,653 m (8,704 ft)
- Prominence: 1,120 m (3,670 ft)
- Listing: Mountains of Alberta; Mountains of British Columbia
- Coordinates: 53°32′06″N 119°53′56″W

Geography
- Country: Canada
- Provinces: Alberta and British Columbia
- Protected area: Willmore Park
- Parent range: Park Ranges
- Topo map: NTS 83E12 Pauline Creek

Mount Pauline is located on the south side of Beaverdam Pass on the Alberta-British Columbia border. It is the 26th most prominent in Alberta. It was named in 1925 after F.A. Pauline. The three slopes are covered in mostly metamorphic shale or slate, due to this it is unknown how difficult it would be to climb to the peak.

== See also ==
- List of peaks on the Alberta–British Columbia border
