= Harry Wright (Canadian politician) =

Canadian politician

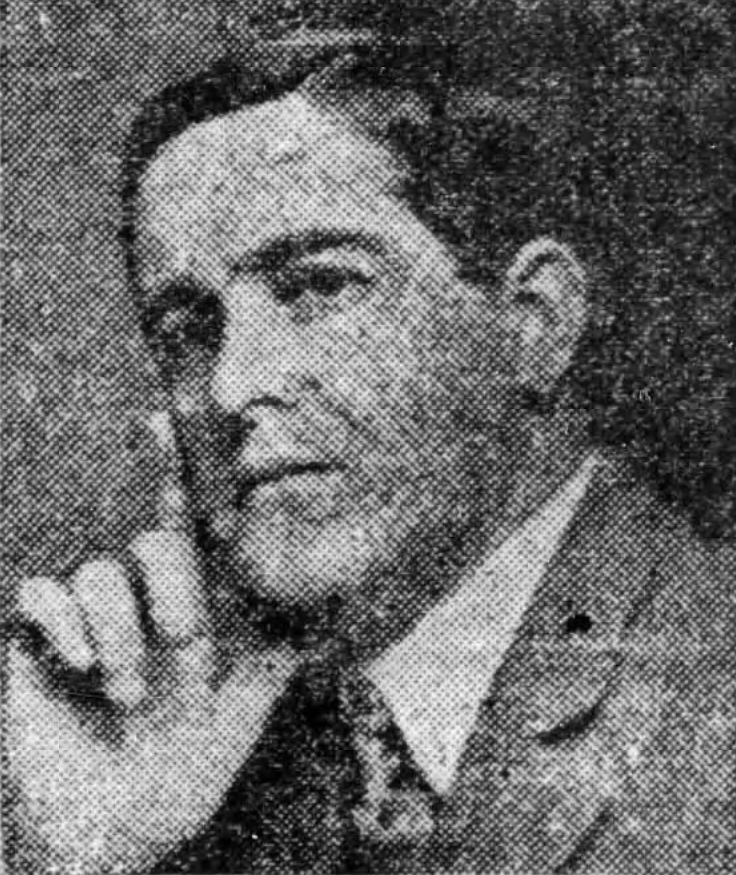

Member of the Legislative Assembly of British Columbia
- In office 1909–1912
- Constituency: Nelson City

Member of the Legislative Assembly of British Columbia
- In office 1903–1907
- Constituency: Ymir

Personal details
- Born: September 11, 1875 Adjala township, Ontario, Canada
- Died: January 1960 (aged 84) Beaton, Ontario, Canada
- Party: Conservative
- Spouse: Jennie McLeod (m. 1900)
- Children: Jack Wright
- Occupation: Financial agent, politician

Harry Wright (September 11, 1875 – January 1960) was a financial agent and political figure in British Columbia. He represented Ymir from 1903 to 1907 and Nelson City from 1909 to 1912 in the Legislative Assembly of British Columbia as a Conservative.

He was born in Adjala township, Simcoe County, Ontario, the son of Joseph Wright, and was educated in Simcoe. In 1900, Wright married Jennie McLeod. He served as mining recorder and assessor, and later as government agent and gold commissioner for Nelson. Wright was defeated when he ran for reelection to the assembly in 1912 as an independent Conservative. He never sought reelection to the Legislature again. He died in Beaton, Ontario in 1960.
