= Newcastle (electoral district) =

Newcastle was a provincial electoral district in the Canadian province of British Columbia to the south and including some of the city of Nanaimo. It was created in 1903, and lasted until 1924, when it was largely replaced by Cowichan-Newcastle.

== MLAs elected ==
Parliament	Term	MLA
10th	1903–1907	Parker Williams
11th	1907–1909	Parker Williams
12th	1909–1912	Parker Williams
13th	1912–1916	Parker Williams
14th	1916–1918	Parker Williams
14th	1918–1920	James Hurst Hawthornthwaite
15th	1920–1924	Samuel Guthrie

== Electoral history ==
=== Elections ===
10th British Columbia election, 1903
Party	Candidate	Votes	%	±%
Socialist	Parker Williams	288	40.06	–
Conservative	Alexander Bryden	207	30.18	–
Liberal	David W. Murray	214	29.76	–
Total valid votes		709	100.00	

11th British Columbia election, 1907
Party	Candidate	Votes	%	±%
Socialist	Parker Williams	259	46.67	6.61
Independent Labour	David James Thomas	197	35.50	New
Conservative	John Sebastian Cairns	99	17.84	(12.34)
Total valid votes		555	100.00	

12th British Columbia election, 1909
Party	Candidate	Votes	%	±%
Socialist	Parker Williams	379	52.64	5.97
Conservative	John Stewart	274	38.06	20.22
Independent	David James Thomas	67	9.31	(26.19)
Total valid votes		720	100.00	

13th British Columbia election, 1912
Party	Candidate	Votes	%	±%
Socialist	Parker Williams	386	50.86	(1.78)
Conservative	Roy Branwood Dier	373	49.14	11.08
Total valid votes		759	100.00	

14th British Columbia election, 1916
Party	Candidate	Votes	%	±%
Independent Socialist	Parker Williams	551	56.11	5.25
Conservative	Roy Branwood Dier	1,186	43.89	(5.25)
Total valid votes		982	100.00	

1920 British Columbia general election
Party	Candidate	Votes	%	±%
Federated Labour	Samuel Guthrie	704	42.00	New
Coalition	William Gilbert Fraser	424	25.30	(18.59)
Independent Socialist	James Hurst Hawthornthwaite	419	25.00	(31.11)
Independent Soldier	John Bickle	129	7.70	New
Total votes		1,676	100.00	
Source(s) An Electoral History of British Columbia, 1871-1986 (PDF). Victoria: Elections British Columbia. 1988. p. 142. ISBN 0-7718-8677-2.

=== Timeline (1903-1920) ===
View source data.
Graph of Newcastle election results by share of votes, 1903–1920
