= Alexander Ingram Fisher =

Canadian politician

Alexander Ingram Fisher (November 20, 1875 – December 10, 1943) was a lawyer, judge and political figure in British Columbia. He represented Fernie from 1916 to 1920 in the Legislative Assembly of British Columbia as a Liberal.

He was born in Waterdown, Ontario (now Hamilton, Ontario), the son of Reverend Simeon Whidden Fisher and Mary Ingram, and was educated in Dundas, at Toronto University and at Osgoode Hall. Fisher was called to the Ontario bar in 1906 and to the British Columbia bar in 1907. In the same year, he married Eva Mary MacKinnon. He ran unsuccessfully for a seat in the assembly in 1909. Fisher was defeated when he ran for reelection in 1920. He was named King's Counsel in 1923. In 1929, Fisher was named to the Supreme Court of British Columbia. He was elevated to the British Columbia Court of Appeal in 1942. Fisher died in hospital in Toronto the following year at the age of 68.
