= James Hurst Hawthornthwaite =

Canadian politician (1863–1926)

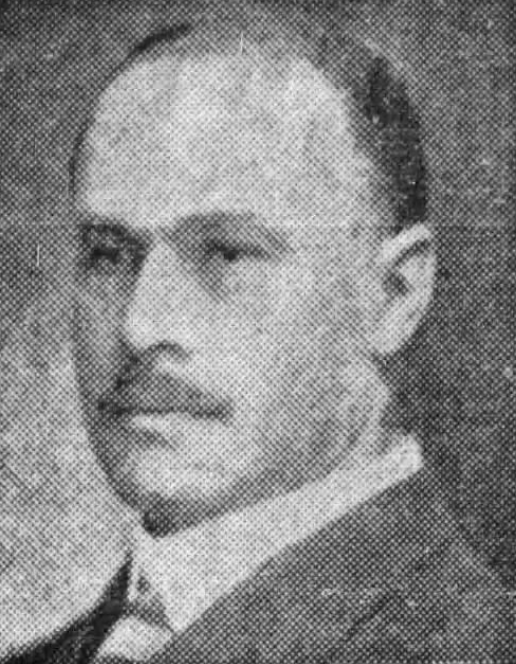

Leader of the Opposition of British Columbia
- In office January 20, 1910 – ? 1910
- Preceded by: vacant
- Succeeded by: Harlan Carey Brewster

Member of the Legislative Assembly for Newcastle
- In office January 24, 1918 – December 1, 1920
- Preceded by: Parker Williams
- Succeeded by: Samuel Guthrie

Member of the Legislative Assembly for Nanaimo City
- In office January 25, 1909 – March 28, 1912
- In office February 21, 1901 – October 26, 1908

Personal details
- Born: 1863 County Westmeath, Ireland
- Died: November 1, 1926 (aged 62–63) Victoria, British Columbia, Canada
- Party: Socialist
- Spouse: Elizabeth Bate (m. 1890)
- Occupation: Businessman, politician

James Hurst "J. H." Hawthornthwaite (1863–November 1, 1926) was an Irish-born land agent, businessman and political figure in British Columbia. He represented Nanaimo City from 1901 to 1908 and from 1909 to 1912 as a Socialist and Newcastle from 1918 to 1920 as an Independent Socialist in the Legislative Assembly of British Columbia. Between January and March 1910, he was recognized as the Leader of the Opposition in the Legislature.

He was born in County Westmeath and educated in England. Hawthornthwaite came to British Columbia during the 1880s. He worked as a secretary for the American consulate in Victoria and the New Vancouver Coal Mining and Land Company Limited. In 1890, he married Elizabeth "Ada" Bate. Hawthornthwaite helped develop a workmen's compensation act in 1902. He also lobbied for improved safety standards and labour reforms in the mining industry. He was a founding member of the Socialist Party of Canada in 1904. He resigned his seat in 1908 to run unsuccessfully in the federal riding of Nanaimo. Hawthornthwaite was able to regain his seat in a by-election held the following year. In 1912, the Socialist Party in Nanaimo became part of the Social Democratic Party of Canada and Hawthornthwaite was not chosen as a candidate. He was later elected to the assembly in a 1918 by-election held in Newcastle after Parker Williams resigned his seat. He was an unsuccessful candidate in both the 1920 and 1924 provincial elections. Hawthornthwaite died in 1926 in Victoria.
