= John George Corry Wood =

Canadian politician (1869–1943)

John George Corry Wood (June 29, 1869 – December 28, 1943) was an English-born political figure in British Columbia. He represented Alberni from 1912 to 1916 as a Conservative.

He was born in London, the son of Samuel Wood and Henrietta James, and came to Canada in 1871. Wood was educated in London and returned to Canada in 1889. In 1893, he married Ethel M. Jones. Wood was elected by acclamation in 1912. He was defeated when he ran for reelection to the assembly in 1916, losing to Harlan Carey Brewster. He never sought reelection to the Legislature again. Wood died in Victoria.
