= Fernie (electoral district) =

Defunct provincial electoral district in British Columbia, Canada

Fernie was the name of a provincial electoral district in the Canadian province of British Columbia centred on the town of Fernie in the southern Rockies. It made its first appearance on the hustings in the election of 1903. In a redistribution after the 1963 election the area covered by this riding was incorporated into the new Kootenay riding (same name but smaller than the original 1871-vintage Kootenay riding).

== Notable MLAs ==
- William Roderick Ross
- Thomas Aubert Uphill - represented Fernie as a Labour MLA for 40 years on behalf of a party named "Labour", of which he was the only successful candidate.

== Electoral history ==
Note: Winners of each election are in bold.

10th British Columbia election, 1903
Party	Candidate	Votes	%	±	Expenditures
Socialist	John Ross McPherson	221	26.12%	–	unknown
Conservative	**William Roderick Ross**	**316**	**37.35%**		unknown
**Liberal**	Edwin Clarke Smith	309	36.52%		unknown
Total valid votes		846	100.00%		
Total rejected ballots					
Turnout		%			

11th British Columbia election, 1907
Party	Candidate	Votes	%	±	Expenditures
Liberal	William Martin Dicken	66	9.42%		unknown
Socialist	Henry George Parson	285	40.66%	–	unknown
Conservative	William Roderick Ross	**350**	**49.93%**		unknown
Total valid votes		701	100.00%		
Total rejected ballots					
Turnout		%			

12th British Columbia election, 1909
Party	Candidate	Votes	%	±	Expenditures
Liberal	Alexander Ingram Fisher	405	21.90%		unknown
Socialist	John David Harrington	649	35.10%	–	unknown
Conservative	**William Roderick Ross**	**795**	**43.00%**		unknown
Total valid votes		1,849	100.00%		
Total rejected ballots					
Turnout		%			

13th British Columbia election, 1912
Party	Candidate	Votes	%	±	Expenditures
Socialist	William Davidson	763	41.69%	–	unknown
Conservative	**William Roderick Ross**	**1,067**	**58.31%**		unknown
Total valid votes		1,830	100.00%		
Total rejected ballots					
Turnout		%			

14th British Columbia election, 1916
Party	Candidate	Votes	%	±	Expenditures
**Liberal**	**Alexander Ingram Fisher**	**903**	**46.38%**		unknown
Socialist	John Amos McDonald	218	11.20%	–	unknown
Conservative	Thomas Aubert Uphill	826	42.42%		unknown
Total valid votes		1,947	100.00%		
Total rejected ballots					
Turnout		%			

15th British Columbia election, 1920
Party	Candidate	Votes	%	±	Expenditures
Liberal	Alexander Ingram Fisher	723	29.77%		unknown
Conservative	Laurence Sherwood K. Herchmer	774	31.86%		unknown
**Federated Labour Party**	**Thomas Aubert Uphill**	**932**	**38.37%**		unknown
Total valid votes		2,429	100.00%		
Total rejected ballots					
Turnout		%			

16th British Columbia election, 1924
Party	Candidate	Votes	%	±	Expenditures
Conservative	Saul A. Bonnell	851	34.12%		unknown
Liberal	James McLean	641	25.70%		unknown
**Federated Labour Party**	**Thomas Aubert Uphill**	**1,002**	**40.18%**		unknown
Total valid votes		2,494	100.00%		
Total rejected ballots					
Turnout		%			

17th British Columbia election, 1928
Party	Candidate	Votes	%	±	Expenditures
Conservative	Michael D. McLean	1,102	40.20%		unknown
**Independent Labour Party ^{1}**	**Thomas Aubert Uphill**	**1,639**	**59.80%**		unknown
Total valid votes		2,741	100.00%		
Total rejected ballots		67			
Turnout		%			
^{1} Labour in Summary of Votes.

18th British Columbia election, 1933
Party	Candidate	Votes	%	±	Expenditures
Liberal	Michael D. McLean	1,299	43.42%		unknown
**Labour (Party) ^{2}**	**Thomas Aubert Uphill**	**1,693**	**56.58%**		unknown
Total valid votes		2,992	100.00%		
Total rejected ballots		26			
Turnout		%			
^{2} i.e. "Labour" was the name of the party.

18th British Columbia election, 1937
Party	Candidate	Votes	%	±	Expenditures
Liberal	Harry Wilfrid Colgan	1,470	46.36%		unknown
**Labour (Party)**	**Thomas Aubert Uphill**	**1,701**	**53.64%**		unknown
Total valid votes		3,171	100.00%		
Total rejected ballots		71			
Turnout		%			

19th British Columbia election, 1941
Party	Candidate	Votes	%	±	Expenditures
Liberal	Harry Wilfrid Colgan	1,214	37.70%		unknown
Co-operative Commonwealth Fed.	James Lancaster	287	8.91%		unknown
**Labour (Party)**	**Thomas Aubert Uphill**	**1,719**	**53.39%**		unknown
Total valid votes		3,220	100.00%		
Total rejected ballots		29			
Turnout		%			

19th British Columbia election, 1945
Party	Candidate	Votes	%	±	Expenditures
Co-operative Commonwealth Fed.	Kenneth Claude Minifie	742	24.34%		unknown
Coalition	Kenny Nash Stewart	1,018	33.39%	–	unknown
**Labour (Party)**	**Thomas Aubert Uphill**	**1,289**	**42.28%**		unknown
Total valid votes		3,049	100.00%		
Total rejected ballots		10			
Turnout		%			

20th British Columbia election, 1949
Party	Candidate	Votes	%	±	Expenditures
Co-operative Commonwealth Fed.	Stephen Alexander Fleming	837	22.06%		unknown
Coalition	Kenny Nash Stewart	1,474	38.85%	–	unknown
**Labour (Party)**	**Thomas Aubert Uphill**	**1,483**	**39.09%**		unknown
Total valid votes		3,794	100.00%		
Total rejected ballots		68			
Turnout		%			

21st British Columbia election, 1952 ^{3}
Party	Candidate	Votes 1st count	%	Votes final count	%	±%	
Co-operative Commonwealth Fed.	Magnus Eliason	612	16.40%	-	-.- %		unknown
B.C. Social Credit League	John Mackenzie Patterson	713	19.11%	-	-.- %		unknown
Liberal	Stewart Kenny Nash	1,117	29.93%	1,329	43.05%		unknown
**Labour (Party)**	**Thomas Aubert Uphill**	**1,290**	**34.57%**	**1,758**	**56.95%**		unknown
Total valid votes		3,732	100.00%	3,087			
Total rejected ballots		61					
Turnout		%					
^{3} Preferential ballot. First and final of three counts only shown.

22nd British Columbia election, 1953 ^{4}
Party	Candidate	Votes 1st count	%	Votes final count	%	±%	
Liberal	Henry Cartmell (Harry) McKay	1,229	34.80%	1,402	43.88%		unknown
Social Credit	William Paniec	702	19.88%				
**Labour (Party)**	**Thomas Aubert Uphill**	**1,601**	**45.32%**	**1,793**	**56.12%**		unknown
Total valid votes		3,532	100.00%	3,195			
Total rejected ballots		145					
Turnout		%					
^{4} Preferential ballot. First and second of two counts only shown.

23rd British Columbia election, 1956
Party	Candidate	Votes	%	±	Expenditures
Social Credit	Frank Joseph Butala	1,181	37.94%	–	unknown
Liberal	Kenny Nash Stewart	611	19.63%		unknown
**Labour (Party)**	**Thomas Aubert Uphill**	**1,321**	**42.43%**		unknown
Total valid votes		3,113	100.00%		
Total rejected ballots		112			
Turnout		%			

24th British Columbia election, 1960
Party	Candidate	Votes	%	±	Expenditures
Social Credit	Frank Joseph Butala	927	29.83%	–	unknown
**Liberal**	**Henry Cartmell (Harry) McKay**	**1,126**	**36.23%**		unknown
CCF	Lloyd Phillips	864	27.80%		unknown
Progressive Conservative	Francis J. Ramage	**191**	**6.15%**		unknown
Total valid votes		3,108	100.00%		
Total rejected ballots		29			
Turnout		%			

25th British Columbia election, 1963
Party	Candidate	Votes	%	±	Expenditures
New Democratic	Ezner De Anna	1,037	35.25%		unknown
**Liberal**	**Henry Cartmell (Harry) McKay**	**1,226**	**41.67%**		unknown
Social Credit	Maurice J. O'Rourke	679	23.08%	–	unknown
Total valid votes		2,942	100.00%		
Total rejected ballots		22			
Turnout		%			

Following the 1963 election, the Fernie riding was redistributed and a new riding, Kootenay was formed (same name as the original 1871 Kootenay riding, but much smaller in scope). The Kootenay riding combined Fernie with the riding of Cranbrook and parts of the Columbia ridings.

== See also ==
- List of British Columbia provincial electoral districts
- Canadian provincial electoral districts
- List of electoral districts in the Kootenays
