= John Robert Brown (British Columbia politician) =

Canadian politician

John Robert Brown (February 19, 1862 – December 8, 1947) was a lawyer and political figure in British Columbia. He represented Greenwood in the Legislative Assembly of British Columbia from 1903 to 1907 as a Liberal.

He was born in Sarnia township, Lambton County, Canada West, the son of Thomas W. Brown, a native of Ireland, and Mary McGregor, and was educated there. He went on to study law in the Sarnia law office of Judge Lister and at Osgoode Hall. In 1896, Brown was admitted to the Ontario bar and set up practice in Sarnia. He came to Rossland, British Columbia in 1898. Brown was admitted to the British Columbia bar the following year and settled in Greenwood. In 1903, he married Florence M. Whitmarsh. He died in Vancouver at the age of 85.
