= Kaslo (electoral district) =

Defunct provincial electoral district in British Columbia, Canada

Kaslo was a provincial electoral district in the Canadian province of British Columbia. It made its first appearance in the election of 1903 and its last in the general election of 1920. It was succeeded by the Kaslo-Slocan riding in the 1924 election.

== Electoral history ==
Note: Winners in each election are in bold.

10th British Columbia election, 1903
Party	Candidate	Votes	%	±	Expenditures
Conservative	**Robert Francis Green**	**268**	**40.42%**		
Liberal	John Ley Retallack	231	34.84%		
Socialist	Samuel Shannon	164	24.74%		
Total valid votes		663	100.00%		

11th British Columbia election, 1907
Party	Candidate	Votes	%	±	Expenditures
Liberal	John Keen	189	44.79%		unknown
Conservative	**Neil Franklin MacKay**	**233**	**55.21%**		unknown
Total valid votes		422	100.00%		
Total rejected ballots					
Turnout		%			

12th British Columbia election, 1909
Party	Candidate	Votes	%	±	Expenditures
Liberal	John Keen	134	31.38%		unknown
Conservative	**Neil Franklin MacKay**	**293**	**68.62%**		unknown
Total valid votes		427	100.00%		
Total rejected ballots					
Turnout		%			

13th British Columbia election, 1912
Party	Candidate	Votes	%	±	Expenditures
Conservative	**Neil Franklin MacKay**	**Accl.**	-.-%		unknown
Total valid votes		n/a	-.-%		
Total rejected ballots					
Turnout		%			

14th British Columbia election, 1916
Party	Candidate	Votes	%	±	Expenditures
**Liberal**	**John Keen**	**456**	**54.94%**		unknown
Conservative	Robert John Long	374	45.06%		unknown
Total valid votes		830	100.00%		
Total rejected ballots					
Turnout		%			

15th British Columbia election, 1920
Party	Candidate	Votes	%	±	Expenditures
Liberal	John Keen	744	49.47%		unknown
Conservative	**Fred W. Lister ^{1}**	**760**	**50.53%**		unknown
Total valid votes		1,504	100.00%		
Total rejected ballots					
		%			
^{1} Also referred to as "Conservative-United Farmer" candidate.

The 1920 election was the last appearance of the Kaslo riding. For the 1924 election it was merged with Slocan to form Kaslo-Slocan.

== See also ==
- List of British Columbia provincial electoral districts
- Canadian provincial electoral districts
- List of electoral districts in the Kootenays
