= George Arthur Fraser =

Canadian politician (1866–1930)

MLA for Grand Forks
- In office 1903–1907

Personal details
- Born: May 17, 1866 Woodstock, Ontario
- Died: March 2, 1930 (aged 63) Victoria, British Columbia
- Party: Conservative

George Arthur Fraser (May 17, 1866 – March 2, 1930) was a Canadian politician. He served in the Legislative Assembly of British Columbia from 1903 until his retirement at the 1907 provincial election, from the electoral district of Grand Forks, as a Conservative.
