= Ernest Miller (politician) =

Canadian politician (1869–1924)

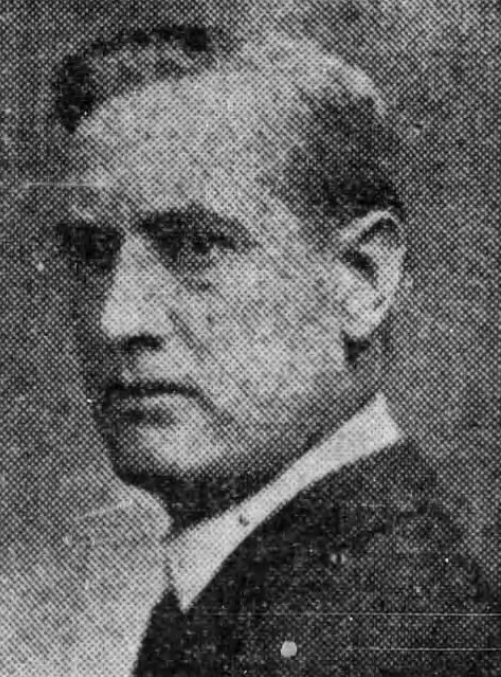

MLA for Grand Forks
- In office 1909–1916
- Preceded by: John McInnis
- Succeeded by: James Edwin Wallace Thompson

Personal details
- Born: November 22, 1869 New Westminster, British Columbia
- Died: October 9, 1924 (aged 54) Vancouver, British Columbia
- Party: Conservative
- Occupation: Lawyer

Ernest Miller (November 22, 1869 – October 9, 1924) was a Canadian politician. After being an unsuccessful candidate in the 1907 provincial election, he served in the Legislative Assembly of British Columbia from 1909 until his defeat in the 1916 provincial election, from the electoral district of Grand Forks, as a Conservative. He was a lawyer. Between June and November 1916, he served in the provincial cabinet as President of the Council.

He died in Vancouver on October 9, 1924.
