= James E. W. Thompson =

Canadian politician

Member of the Legislative Assembly of British Columbia
- In office 1916–1920
- Preceded by: Ernest Miller
- Succeeded by: Ezra Churchill Henniger
- Constituency: Grand Forks

Personal details
- Born: April 29, 1879 Pembroke, Ontario
- Died: March 6, 1958 (aged 78) Vancouver, British Columbia
- Party: British Columbia Liberal Party
- Spouse: Henrietta Myrtle (Etta) Baird
- Children: 2
- Occupation: merchant

James Edwin Wallace Thompson (April 29, 1879 – March 6, 1958) was a Canadian politician. He served in the Legislative Assembly of British Columbia from 1916 until his retirement at the 1920 election from the electoral district of Grand Forks, a member of the Liberal party.
