= William Ross MacLean =

Canadian politician

William Ross MacLean (February 6, 1872 – June 22, 1931) was a soda water manufacturer and political figure in British Columbia. He represented Nelson City from 1912 until his retirement at the 1916 election as a Conservative.

He was born in Lorne, Pictou County, Nova Scotia, the son of Daniel K. MacLean and Sarah Ross, and was educated in Pictou. In 1912, MacLean married Mary Helen Clarke. He died in Nelson at the age of 59.
