= Samuel Arthur Cawley =

Canadian politician (1858–1947)

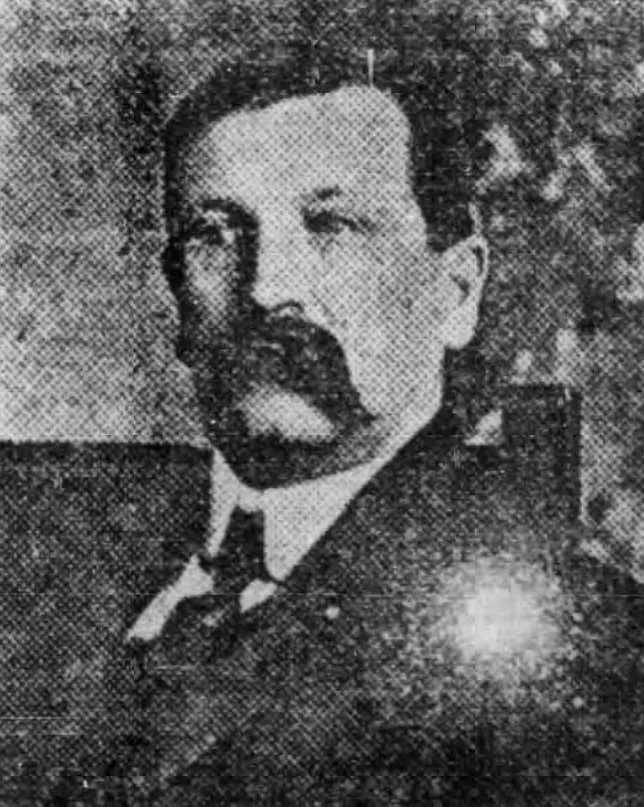

Member of the Legislative Assembly of British Columbia
- In office 1909–1916
- Constituency: Chilliwhack

Personal details
- Born: November 29, 1858 County of Brant, Ontario
- Died: January 5, 1947 (aged 88) Chilliwack, British Columbia
- Party: Conservative
- Spouse: Emma Reeves (m. 1882)
- Occupation: Farmer, merchant, politician

Samuel Arthur Cawley (November 29, 1858 – January 5, 1947) was a farmer, merchant, miner, real estate and insurance agent and political figure in British Columbia. He represented Chilliwhack from 1909 until his retirement at the 1916 provincial election as a Conservative.

== Biography ==
He was born in Brant County, Ontario in 1858, the son of Samuel Cawley and Isabella Falconer, and was educated there. Cawley came to British Columbia in 1878. In 1882, he married Emma Reeves. He farmed in the Chilliwack Valley until 1890, when he opened a hardware business in Chilliwack. He sold that business in 1896 and mined in the Harrison River area. Finally, Cawley returned to Chilliwack, where he established a real estate, insurance and mining business. He ran unsuccessfully for a seat in the provincial assembly in 1894 and in 1907. Cawley died in Chilliwack at the age of 88 in 1947.
