= John William McIntosh =

Canadian politician (1870–1939)

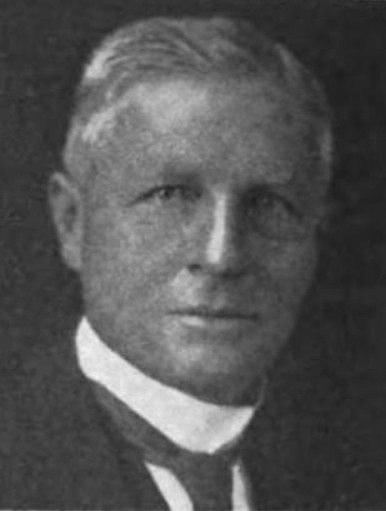

Member of the Legislative Assembly of British Columbia
- In office 1916–1920
- Constituency: Vancouver City

Personal details
- Born: August 19, 1870 Guelph, Ontario
- Died: August 12, 1939 (aged 68) Burnaby, British Columbia
- Party: Liberal
- Spouse: Helena Keith (m. 1902)
- Children: 1
- Education: University of Toronto
- Occupation: Physician, politician

John William McIntosh (August 19, 1870 – August 12, 1939) was a physician and political figure in British Columbia. He represented Vancouver City from 1916 to 1920 in the Legislative Assembly of British Columbia as a Liberal. He was defeated in the 1920 provincial election in the riding of South Vancouver where he ran as an independent candidate. He was defeated again in the 1924 provincial election in the riding of The Islands where he ran as a Provincial Party candidate.

== Biography ==
He was born in Guelph, Ontario on August 19, 1870, and was educated at the University of Toronto. He married Helena Keith on September 2, 1902, and they had one daughter.

McIntosh practised on Manitoulin Island, also serving as coroner. Around 1906, he entered practice at Vancouver, British Columbia, specializing in internal medicine. He served overseas during World War I. McIntosh served as Medical Health Officer for New Westminster and then Vancouver. He died at his home in Burnaby at age 68, having retired within the last year or so.
