= Howard John Lloyd =

Canadian politician

MLA for Fort George
- In office 1975–1979

Personal details
- Born: March 16, 1930 Turtleford, Saskatchewan
- Died: December 27, 2022 (aged 92) Nanaimo, British Columbia
- Party: Social Credit Party of British Columbia

Howard John Lloyd (March 16, 1930 – December 27, 2022) was a Canadian politician. He served in the Legislative Assembly of British Columbia from 1975 to 1979, as a Social Credit member for the constituency of Fort George.
