= William Robert Braden =

Canadian politician (1858–1922)

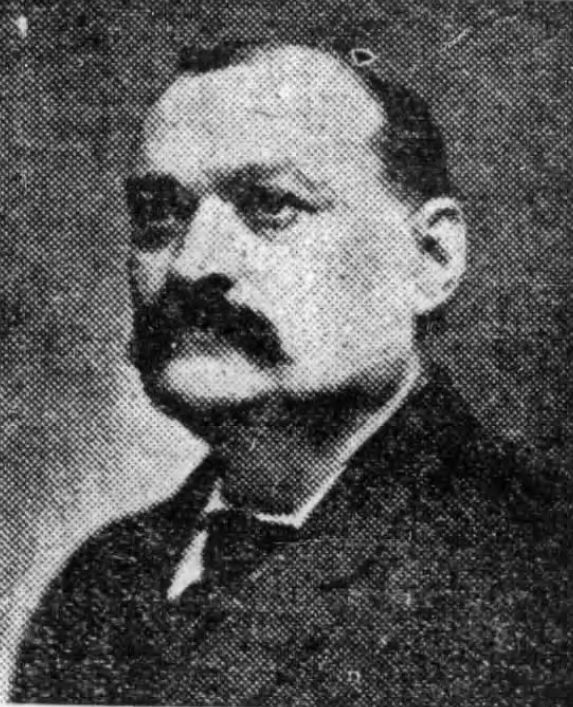

Member of the Legislative Assembly of British Columbia
- In office 1909–1912
- Constituency: Rossland City

Personal details
- Born: March 11, 1858 Cedar Grove, Canada West
- Died: February 14, 1922 (aged 63) Victoria, British Columbia
- Party: Conservative
- Spouse: Annie Wilkes (m. 1885)
- Occupation: Grocer, politician

William Robert Braden (March 11, 1858 – February 14, 1922) was a grocer and political figure in British Columbia. He represented Rossland City from 1909 until his retirement at the 1912 election in the Legislative Assembly of British Columbia as a Conservative.

He was born in Cedar Grove, Canada West, the son of Andrew Braden, a native of Ireland, and was educated in Ontario. In 1885, he married Annie Wilkes. He died in Victoria at the age of 63.
