= Lorne Argyle Campbell =

Canadian politician (1871–1947)

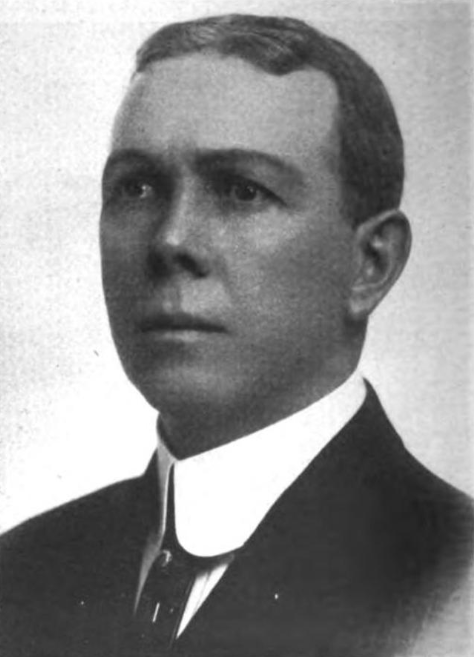

Member of the Legislative Assembly of British Columbia
- In office 1912–1916
- Constituency: Rossland City

Personal details
- Born: March 5, 1871 Perth, Ontario
- Died: April 9, 1947 (aged 76) Rossland, British Columbia
- Party: Conservative
- Spouse: Mary Spahr Hosier (m. 1903)
- Occupation: Businessman, politician

Lorne Argyle Campbell (March 5, 1871 – April 9, 1947) was a businessman and political figure in British Columbia. He represented Rossland City from 1912 to 1916 in the Legislative Assembly of British Columbia as a Conservative.

== Biography ==
He was born in Perth, Ontario, the son of John G. Campbell and Helen Gray Murdoch, and was educated at Perth Collegiate. He was first employed with Edison General Electric in Toronto in 1889. In 1891, he was hired by Canadian General Electric; he became chief engineer for the company in 1896. In 1898, he went to British Columbia after being hired by West Kootenay Power and Light Co. In 1903, Campbell married Mary Spahr Hosier. He was president of Cascade Power and Light Co. and of McGillivray Creek Coal & Coke Ltd. of Alberta. Campbell served in the provincial cabinet as Minister of Mines between December 1915 and November 1916. He also served as Minister of Finance and Agriculture between March and June 1916 and then as Minister of Finance between June and July 1916. Campbell was an unsuccessful candidate for a seat in the provincial assembly in 1907. He was defeated by William David Willson when he ran for reelection in the newly created riding of Rossland in 1916. He died in Rossland at the age of 76.
