= Henry Robson Bowman =

Canadian politician (1896–1954)

Henry Robson Bowman (June 16, 1896 – November 5, 1954) was a political figure in British Columbia. He represented Fort George in the Legislative Assembly of British Columbia from 1949 to 1952 as a Liberal.

He was born in Mount Forest, Ontario, the son of William Robert Bowman and Mary Adeline Teskey, and was educated at the University of Saskatchewan. In 1928, Bowman married Marian Edna Potter. He was Colonization and Agriculture Superintendent for the Canadian National Railway. Bowman was president of the Board of Trade for Fort George. From 1949 to 1952, he served in the provincial cabinet as Minister of Agriculture. In 1952, he also served as Minister of Fisheries and Minister of Railways. Bowman was defeated by Llewellyn Leslie King when he ran for reelection in 1952. He died in Victoria at the age of 57.
