= William Roderick Ross =

Canadian politician (1869–1928)

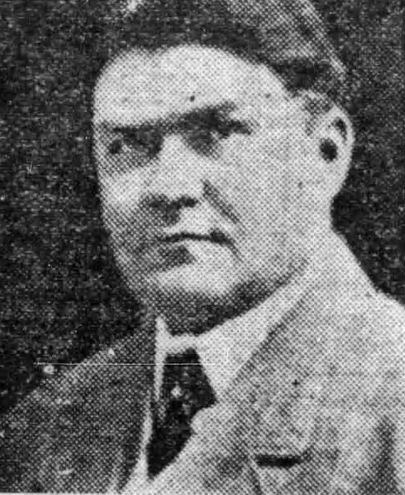

Member of the Legislative Assembly of British Columbia
- In office 1916–1920
- Constituency: Fort George

Member of the Legislative Assembly of British Columbia
- In office 1903–1916
- Constituency: Fernie

Personal details
- Born: March 29, 1869 Fort Chipewyan, now in Alberta
- Died: February 4, 1928 (aged 58) Cranbrook, British Columbia
- Party: Conservative
- Spouse: Leila Young
- Education: St. John's College
- Occupation: Lawyer, politician

William Roderick Ross (March 29, 1869 – February 4, 1928) was a lawyer and political figure in British Columbia. He represented Fernie from 1903 to 1916 and Fort George from 1916 to 1920 in the Legislative Assembly of British Columbia as a Conservative.

He was born in Fort Chipewyan, Athabasca, the son of Donald Ross, and was educated at St. John's College in Winnipeg. Ross was called to the Manitoba bar in 1890. He practised in Winnipeg from 1890 to 1896 and then at Fort Steele from 1897 to 1900. Ross moved to Fernie in 1901. He married Leila Young. In 1906, he was named King's Counsel. Ross served in the provincial cabinet as Minister of Lands from 1910 to 1916. He did not seek a seventh term in the Legislature in the 1924 provincial election. He died in Cranbrook at the age of 58.
