= Fort George (electoral district) =

Defunct provincial electoral district in British Columbia, Canada

Fort George was the name of a provincial electoral district in the Canadian province of British Columbia from 1916 to 1975. Its successor ridings were Prince George South and Prince George North.

== Notable MLAs ==
- Ray Gillis Williston (Social Credit, 1953–1972)

== Electoral history ==
Note: Winners in each election are in bold.

14th British Columbia election, 1916
Party	Candidate	Votes	%	±	Expenditures
Independent Progressive ^{1}	William George Gillett	158	13.75%		unknown
Independent Socialist	John McInnis	492	42.82%		unknown
Conservative	**William Roderick Ross**	**499**	**43.43%**		unknown
Total valid votes		1,149	100.00%		
Total rejected ballots					
Turnout		%			
^{1} McInnis received the unofficial support of the Liberals after their candidate, C.A. Gaskill, withdrew in order to increase the chances of defeating Ross. Gillett was part of a breakaway Conservative group. Alleged irregularities led to a commission of inquiry which found the charges not substantiated.

1920 British Columbia general election
Party	Candidate	Votes	%
Conservative	Samuel Williams Cocker	787	38.09
Liberal	Henry George Thomas Perry	1,140	55.18
Independent Farmer	John Samuel Ross	139	6.73
Total valid votes		2,066	100.00

16th British Columbia election, 1924
Party	Candidate	Votes	%	±	Expenditures
Conservative	Frederick Parker Burden	851	44.43%		unknown
**Liberal**	**Henry George Thomas Perry**	**1,080**	**46.67%**		unknown
Provincial	John A. Shearer	206	8.90%	–	unknown
Total valid votes		2,314	100.00%		
Total rejected ballots					
Turnout		%			
^{2} Endorsed by Provincial Party.

17th British Columbia election, 1928
Party	Candidate	Votes	%	±	Expenditures
Conservative	**Frederick Parker Burden**	**1,487**	**51.61%**		unknown
Liberal	Henry George Thomas Perry	1,394	48.39%		unknown
Total valid votes		2,881	100.00%		
Total rejected ballots		47			
Turnout		%			

1933 British Columbia general election
Party	Candidate	Votes	%
Liberal	Henry George Thomas Perry	1,577	56.32
Co-operative Commonwealth	Alexander Sinclair	625	22.32
Non-Partisan Independent Group	Roy Walter Alward	310	11.07
Union of Electors	William Finnbar Mahoney	192	6.86
Independent Labour	Clement Pemberton Deykin	96	3.43
Total valid votes		2,800	100.00
Total rejected ballots		28	

19th British Columbia election, 1937
Party	Candidate	Votes	%	±	Expenditures
Conservative	Frederick Parker Burden	234	8.08%		unknown
Co-operative Commonwealth Fed.	John McInnis	1,170	40.39%		unknown
**Liberal**	**Henry George Thomas Perry**	**1,493**	**51.54%**		unknown
Total valid votes		2,897	100.00%		
Total rejected ballots		57			
Turnout		%			

20th British Columbia election, 1941
Party	Candidate	Votes	%	±	Expenditures
Co-operative Commonwealth Fed.	James Warren Penberthy	928	35.58%		unknown
**Liberal**	**Henry George Thomas Perry**	**1,334**	**51.15%**		unknown
Conservative	Alexander McBain Young	346	13.27%		unknown
Total valid votes		2,608	100.00%		
Total rejected ballots		45			
Turnout		%			

21st British Columbia election, 1945
Party	Candidate	Votes	%	±	Expenditures
**Co-operative Commonwealth Fed.**	**John McInnis**	**1,726**	**55.73%**		unknown
Coalition	Henry George Thomas Perry	1,371	44.27%	–	unknown
Total valid votes		3,097	100.00%		
Total rejected ballots		58			
Turnout		%			

22nd British Columbia election, 1949
Party	Candidate	Votes	%	±	Expenditures
Coalition	**Henry Robson Bowman**	**3,232**	**59.86%**	–	unknown
Co-operative Commonwealth Fed.	John McInnis	2,167	40.14%		unknown
Total valid votes		5,399	100.00%		
Total rejected ballots		176			
Turnout		%			

23rd British Columbia election, 1952 ^{2}
Party	Candidate	Votes 1st count	%	Votes final count	%	±%	
Liberal	Henry Robson Bowman	2,022	33.73%	2,468	47.21%		unknown
Social Credit	**Llewellyn Leslie King**	**2,009**	**33.51%**	**2,760**	**52.79%**		
Co-operative Commonwealth Fed.	John McInnis	1,593	26.57%	-	-.- %		unknown
Conservative	Cyril Westaway	371	6.19%	-	%		unknown
Total valid votes		5,995	100.00%	5,228	%		
Total rejected ballots		345					
Turnout		%					
^{2} Preferential ballot. First and final counts of three shown only.

24th British Columbia election, 1953 ^{3}
Party	Candidate	Votes 1st count	%	Votes final count	%	±%	
Co-operative Commonwealth Fed.	Frank Bond	1,677	25.267%	-	-.- %		unknown
Liberal	Garvin James Edward Dezell	1,802	27.14%	2,173	38.24%		unknown
Social Credit	**Ray Gillis Williston**	3,160	47.60%	3,509	61.76%		
Total valid votes		6,639	100.00%	5,682	%		
Total rejected ballots		308					
Turnout		%					
^{3} Preferential ballot. First and final counts of two shown only.

25th British Columbia election, 1956
Party	Candidate	Votes	%	±	Expenditures
**Co-operative Commonwealth Fed.**	Carl Waldemar Kienzie	1,304	20.20%		unknown
Liberal	Frank Samuel Perry	1,376	21.32%		unknown
Social Credit	**Ray Gillis Williston**	**3,774**	**58.48%**	–	unknown
Total valid votes		6,454	100.00%		
Total rejected ballots		236			
Turnout		%			

26th British Columbia election, 1960
Party	Candidate	Votes	%	±	Expenditures
Progressive Conservative	John Anthony Coates	346	3.78%		unknown
Liberal	Holger Enemark	1,416	15.45%		unknown
Co-operative Commonwealth Fed.	William Kenneth Rutherford	2,336	25.49%		unknown
Social Credit	**Ray Gillis Williston**	5,066	55.28%	–	unknown
Total valid votes		9,164	100.00%		
Total rejected ballots		163			
Turnout		%			

27th British Columbia election, 1963
Party	Candidate	Votes	%	±	Expenditures
Liberal	Thomas Raymond Cullinane	961	11.00%		unknown
New Democratic	William Kenneth Rutherford	1,725	19.75%		unknown
Progressive Conservative	Dudley Erwin Sawley	739	8.46%		unknown
Social Credit	**Ray Gillis Williston**	**5,308**	**60.78%**	–	unknown
Total valid votes		8,733	100.00%		
Total rejected ballots		72			
Turnout		%			

28th British Columbia election, 1966
Party	Candidate	Votes	%	±	Expenditures
New Democratic	Patrick Ivan McConnell Denton	2,802	26.95%		unknown
Liberal	Henry Allan Hope	1,313	12.63%		unknown
Social Credit	**Ray Gillis Williston**	**6,282**	**60.42%**	–	unknown
Total valid votes		10,397	100.00%		
Total rejected ballots		101			
Turnout		%			

29th British Columbia election, 1969
Party	Candidate	Votes	%	±	Expenditures
Liberal	Tex Cyril Enemark	1,291	8.26%		unknown
New Democratic	John Lucas (Jack) Whittaker	4,196	26.83%		unknown
Social Credit	**Ray Gillis Williston**	**10,152**	**64.91%**	–	unknown
Total valid votes		15,639	100.00%		
Total rejected ballots		159			
Turnout		%			

30th British Columbia election, 1972
Party	Candidate	Votes	%	±	Expenditures
New Democratic	**Allan Alfred Nunweiler**	**8,435**	**39.99%**		unknown
Liberal	Ronald L. Racette	710	3.37%		unknown
Social Credit	Ray Gillis Williston	8,194	38.85%	–	unknown
Progressive Conservative	John Galt Wilson	3,754	17.80%		unknown
Total valid votes		21,093	100.00%		
Total rejected ballots		252			
Turnout		%			

31st British Columbia election, 1975
Party	Candidate	Votes	%	±	Expenditures
Progressive Conservative	Alan Graham Anderton	1,273	4.41%		unknown
Liberal	Frederick Joseph House	1,695	5.87%		unknown
Social Credit	**Howard John Lloyd**	**16,455**	**57.01%**	–	unknown
New Democratic	Allan Alfred Nunweiler	9,442	32.71%		unknown
Total valid votes		28,865	100.00%		
Total rejected ballots		306			
Turnout		%			

== See also ==
- List of British Columbia provincial electoral districts
- Canadian provincial electoral districts
