= Harlan Carey Brewster =

Canadian politician (1870–1918)

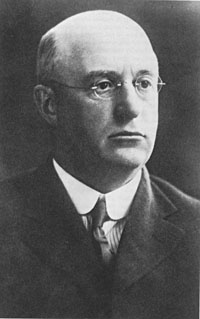

18th Premier of British Columbia
- In office November 23, 1916 – March 1, 1918
- Monarch: George V
- Lieutenant Governor: Francis Stillman Barnard
- Preceded by: William John Bowser
- Succeeded by: John Oliver

MLA for Alberni
- In office February 2, 1907 – March 28, 1912
- Preceded by: William Wallace Burns McInnes
- Succeeded by: John George Corry Wood
- In office September 14, 1916 – March 1, 1918
- Preceded by: John George Corry Wood
- Succeeded by: Richard Pateman Wallis

MLA for Victoria City
- In office March 4, 1916 – March 1, 1918 Serving with Henry Frederick William Behnsen, Frederick Davey, Henry Broughton Thomson, George Bell, Henry Charles Hall, John Hart
- Preceded by: Richard McBride
- Succeeded by: Richard Pateman Wallis

Personal details
- Born: November 10, 1870 Harvey, New Brunswick
- Died: March 1, 1918 (aged 47) Calgary, Alberta
- Party: Liberal
- Spouse: Annie Lucinda Downie (m. 1892)
- Children: 1 son and 3 daughters
- Occupation: salmon canner
- Profession: politician

Harlan Carey Brewster (November 10, 1870 – March 1, 1918) was a politician in British Columbia, Canada. Brewster arrived in British Columbia in 1893 and had various careers working on a ship and then in a cannery. He eventually became the owner of his own canning company. He was elected to the provincial legislature in the 1907 election and was one of only two Liberals elected to the legislature in the 1909 election.

Brewster became leader of the opposition, and was elected party leader in March 1912. He lost his seat a few weeks later in the 1912 election, which returned no Liberals at all. In 1916, he won election to the legislature again through a by-election and led his party to victory in a general election later that year by campaigning on a reform platform. Brewster promised to end patronage in the civil service, end political machines, improve workmen's compensation and labour laws, bring in votes for women, and other progressive reforms.

In government, Brewster brought in women's suffrage, instituted prohibition, and combatted political corruption before his unexpected death of pneumonia in 1918. He is interred in the Ross Bay Cemetery in Victoria, British Columbia.

He also served as Minister of Finance between February 15, 1917 and June 11, 1917.
