= Ymir (electoral district) =

Defunct provincial electoral district in British Columbia, Canada

Coordinates: 49.282°N 117.233°W

Ymir was the name of a provincial electoral district of British Columbia, Canada, located in the West Kootenay region. It is named after Ymir, a village east of Trail and south of Nelson. It made its first appearance on the hustings in the election of 1903 and lasted only until 1912, after which the area was represented by Trail riding.

== Electoral history ==
Note: Winners of each election are in bold.

10th British Columbia election, 1903
Party	Candidate	Votes	%	±	Expenditures
Liberal	Alfred Parr ^{1}	323	40.07%		unknown
**Conservative**	**Harry Wright**	**483**	**59.93%**		unknown
Total valid votes		806	100.00%		
Total rejected ballots					
Turnout		%			
^{1} Parr may have been a Labour candidate although Gosnell labels him a Liberal; he may have campaigned as both.

11th British Columbia election, 1907
Party	Candidate	Votes	%	±	Expenditures
Independent	John Houston	147	20.68%		unknown
Liberal	John Frederick Hume	239	33.61%		unknown
**Conservative**	**James Hargrave Schofield**	**325**	**45.71%**		unknown
Total valid votes		711	100.00%		
Total rejected ballots					
Turnout		%			

12th British Columbia election, 1909
Party	Candidate	Votes	%	±	Expenditures
Socialist	Alexander M. Oliver	366	34.37%	–	unknown
**Conservative**	**James Hargrave Schofield**	**699**	**65.63%**		unknown
Total valid votes		1,065	100.00%		
Total rejected ballots					
Turnout		%			

13th British Columbia election, 1912
Party	Candidate	Votes	%	±	Expenditures
Socialist	Richard Parmater Pettipiece	261	20.31%	–	unknown
**Conservative**	**James Hargrave Schofield**	1,024	79.69%		unknown
Total valid votes		1,285	100.00%		
Total rejected ballots					
Turnout		%			

Following the 1912 election, most of the area of the Ymir riding was incorporated into the new riding of Nelson.

== See also ==
- List of British Columbia provincial electoral districts
- Canadian provincial electoral districts
- List of electoral districts in the Kootenays
