= Henry George Thomas Perry =

Canadian politician

Henry George Thomas Perry (March 18, 1889 – December 26, 1959) was an English-born real estate and insurance broker, journalist and political figure in British Columbia, Canada. He represented Fort George in the Legislative Assembly of British Columbia from 1920 to 1928 and from 1933 to 1945 as a Liberal.

He was born in Whitwick, Leicester, the son of Samuel Perry and Annie Ward, was educated in Coalville and Loughborough, and came to Canada in 1910, settling in Prince George in 1912. In 1911, Perry married Florence Smith. He was mayor of Prince George from 1917 to 1918, in 1920 and in 1924. He was owner and editor of the Fort George Tribune, The Prince George Citizen, The Nechako Chronicle and the Prince Rupert Daily News. Perry was defeated by Frederick Parker Burden when he ran for reelection in 1928. He ran unsuccessfully for a seat in the House of Commons in 1930. Perry was Deputy Speaker of the Legislature from 1924 to 1928, speaker for the assembly from 1934 to 1937, and served in the British Columbia cabinet as Minister of Education from 1941 to 1945. He was defeated by John McInnis when he ran for reelection to the provincial assembly in 1945.

Perry died in Victoria of a heart attack at the age of 70.

== Election results (partial) ==
1920 British Columbia general election: Fort George
Party	Candidate	Votes	%
Conservative	Samuel Williams Cocker	787	38.09
Liberal	Henry George Thomas Perry	1,140	55.18
Independent Farmer	John Samuel Ross	139	6.73
Total valid votes		2,066	100.00
