= Chilliwhack (electoral district) =

Defunct provincial electoral district in British Columbia, Canada

Chilliwhack was a provincial electoral district in the Canadian province of British Columbia from 1903 until 1912. It was the successor riding to Westminster-Chilliwhack and itself was succeeded by Chilliwack after the 1912 election.

== Electoral history ==
Note: Winners of each election are in bold.

10th British Columbia election, 1903
Party	Candidate	Votes	%	±	Expenditures
Conservative	John Luther Atkinson	267	44.72%		unknown
**Liberal**	**Charles William Munro**	**330**	**55.28%**		unknown
Total valid votes		597	100.00%		
Total rejected ballots					
Turnout		%			

11th British Columbia election, 1907
Party	Candidate	Votes	%	±	Expenditures
Conservative	Samuel Arthur Cawley	310	48.36%		unknown
**Liberal**	**Charles William Munro**	**331**	**51.64%**		unknown
Total valid votes		641	100.00%		
Total rejected ballots					
Turnout		%			

12th British Columbia election, 1909
Party	Candidate	Votes	%	±	Expenditures
Conservative	**Samuel Arthur Cawley**	604	54.07%		unknown
Liberal	Charles William Munro	513	45.93%	–	unknown
Total valid votes		1,117	100.00%		
Total rejected ballots					
Turnout		%			

13th British Columbia election, 1912
Party	Candidate	Votes	%	±	Expenditures
Conservative	**Samuel Arthur Cawley**	**Acclaimed**	-.-%		unknown
Total valid votes		n/a	100.00%		
Total rejected ballots					
Turnout		%			

A redistribution following the 1912 election adjusted this riding's boundaries somewhat, and adopted the more modern form of the name, such that the successor riding is Chilliwack (no "h").

== See also ==
- List of British Columbia provincial electoral districts
- Canadian provincial electoral districts
