= Nelson City (provincial electoral district) =

Defunct provincial electoral district in British Columbia, Canada

Nelson City was a provincial electoral district in the Canadian province of British Columbia. It first appeared on the hustings in the 1903 election and lasted until 1912, after which the area of Nelson was represented by the Nelson riding.

== Electoral history ==
Note: Winners in each election are in bold.

10th British Columbia election, 1903
Party	Candidate	Votes	%	±	Expenditures
**Conservative**	**John Houston**	**424**	**54.29%**		unknown
Liberal	Sidney Stockton Taylor	357	45.71%		unknown
Total valid votes		781	100.00%		
Total rejected ballots					
Turnout		%			

11th British Columbia election, 1907
Party	Candidate	Votes	%	±	Expenditures
**Liberal**	**George Arthur Benjamin Hall**	**314**	**43.67%**		unknown
Conservative	John Andrew Kirkpatrick	309	42.98%		unknown
Socialist	Edward Francis (Frank) Phillips	96	13.35%	–	unknown
Total valid votes		719	100.00%		
Total rejected ballots					
Turnout		%			

12th British Columbia election, 1909
Party	Candidate	Votes	%	±	Expenditures
Liberal	Albert Edward Crease	323	31.18%		unknown
Socialist	John Henry Matheson	148	14.29%	–	unknown
**Conservative**	**Harry Wright**	**565**	**54.54%**		unknown
Total valid votes		1,036	100.00%		
Total rejected ballots					
Turnout		%			

13th British Columbia election, 1912
Party	Candidate	Votes	%	±	Expenditures
Socialist	Arthur Westbrook Harrod	177	19.84%	–	unknown
**Conservative**	**William Ross MacLean**	**527**	**59.08%**		
Independent Conservative	Harry Wright	188	21.08%		
Total valid votes		892	100.00%		

The Nelson City riding made its last appearance in the 1912 election. Following redistribution, the new riding covering this area in the 1916 election was Nelson.

== See also ==
- List of British Columbia provincial electoral districts
- Canadian provincial electoral districts
- List of electoral districts in the Kootenays
