= Saanich (electoral district) =

Defunct provincial electoral district in British Columbia, Canada

Saanich was a provincial electoral district in British Columbia, Canada. It made its first appearance in the election of 1903 and its last in the general election of 1963 after which it was combined with parts of the former Nanaimo and the Islands riding to form Saanich and the Islands. The same area is currently represented by Saanich North and the Islands and Saanich South.

== Election results ==
1920 British Columbia general election
Party	Candidate	Votes	%
Liberal	Frederick Arthur Pauline	1,858	39.78
Conservative	Marshall Pollock Gordon	1,756	37.59
Soldier–Labour	Malcolm Alexander Orford	1,057	22.63
Total valid votes		4,671	100.00

== See also ==
- List of British Columbia provincial electoral districts
- Canadian provincial electoral districts
- List of electoral districts in Greater Victoria

Legislative Assembly of British Columbia
Preceded by Yale	Constituency represented by the Premier of British Columbia; 1928–1933	Succeeded by Prince Rupert
