= Parker Williams =

Canadian politician

Member of the Legislative Assembly for Newcastle
- In office October 3, 1903 – January 1, 1917
- Preceded by: district established
- Succeeded by: James Hurst Hawthornthwaite

Personal details
- Born: May 31, 1872 Brecknockshire, Wales
- Died: June 17, 1958 (aged 86) North Oyster, British Columbia
- Party: Socialist Party of British Columbia
- Spouse: Eleanor Price. (m. 1891)
- Occupation: farmer, miner

Parker James Williams (May 31, 1872 – June 17, 1958) was a Welsh-born coal miner and political figure in British Columbia. After being an unsuccessful candidate in a 1902 provincial byelection, he represented Newcastle in the Legislative Assembly of British Columbia from 1903 to 1917 as a Socialist and later as an independent Socialist.

He was born in 1872 and worked as a coal miner in Wales, Alberta and Washington state. Williams also worked on railways in Ontario and British Columbia. In 1891, he married Eleanor Price. Williams lived in Nanaimo. In 1917, he resigned his seat in the assembly after he was named a commissioner for the Worker's Compensation Board and he served in that function until he retired in April 1943. He also was responsible for administering the Mothers Pension Act and the Old Age Pension Act. Williams died at the age of 86 on his farm near Ladysmith.
