= Frederick Arthur Pauline =

Canadian politician

Frederick Arthur Pauline (September 19, 1861 – June 30, 1955) was an English-born merchant and political figure in British Columbia, Canada. He represented Saanich in the Legislative Assembly of British Columbia from 1916 to 1924 as a Liberal.

He was born in Henley-on-Thames and came to Canada in 1883. He operated a wholesale dry goods business. Pauline served as president of the Victoria Board of Trade from 1907 to 1911, when he retired from his business. He served as Speaker of the Legislative Assembly of British Columbia from 1922 to 1924 (he served as Deputy Speaker from 1921 to 1922). Pauline was defeated when he ran for reelection in 1924 and was named Agent-General for British Columbia in London later that year.

Mount Pauline was named in his honour.
