= Slocan (electoral district) =

Defunct provincial electoral district in British Columbia, Canada

Slocan was a provincial electoral district of British Columbia, Canada. It made its first appearance in the election of 1903 and its last in the general election of 1920. It was succeeded by the Kaslo-Slocan riding in the 1924 election.

== Electoral history ==
Note: Winners in each election are in bold.

10th British Columbia election, 1903
| Party | Candidate | Votes | % | ± | Expenditures |
|---|---|---|---|---|---|
| **Labour** ^{1} | **William Davidson** | **358** | **55.33%** | | unknown |
| Conservative | William Hunter | 289 | 44.67% | | unknown |
| Total valid votes | | 647 | 100.00% | | |
| Total rejected ballots | | | | | |
| Turnout | | % | | | |
^{1} Nominated by the Slocan Labour Party, which was based on the Provincial Progressive Party of 1902, and supported by the Socialists

11th British Columbia election, 1907
| Party | Candidate | Votes | % | ± | Expenditures |
|---|---|---|---|---|---|
| Socialist | William Davidson | 119 | 30.28% | – | unknown |
| Liberal | Archibald B. Docksteader | 81 | 20.61% | | unknown |
| Conservative | **William Hunter** | **193** | **49.11%** | | unknown |
| Total valid votes | | 393 | 100.00% | | |
| Total rejected ballots | | | | | |
| Turnout | | % | | | |

1909 British Columbia general election
| Party | Candidate | Votes | % |
|---|---|---|---|
| Conservative | William Hunter | 309 | 57.43 |
| Socialist | John William Bennett | 172 | 31.97 |
| Independent Labour | Joseph Colebrook Harris | 57 | 10.59 |
| Total valid votes | | 538 | 100.00 |

13th British Columbia election, 1912
| Party | Candidate | Votes | % | ± | Expenditures |
|---|---|---|---|---|---|
| Conservative | **William Hunter** | **373** | **65.32%** | | unknown |
| Socialist | Anthony Shilland | 198 | 34.68% | – | unknown |
| Total valid votes | | 571 | 100.00% | | |
| Total rejected ballots | | | | | |
| Turnout | | % | | | |

14th British Columbia election, 1916
| Party | Candidate | Votes | % | ± | Expenditures |
|---|---|---|---|---|---|
| Conservative | William Hunter | 447 | 49.94% | | unknown |
| **Liberal** | **Charles Franklin Nelson** | **448** | **50.06%** | | unknown |
| Total valid votes | | 895 | 100.00% | | |
| Total rejected ballots | | | | | |
| Turnout | | % | | | |

15th British Columbia election, 1920
| Party | Candidate | Votes | % | ± | Expenditures |
|---|---|---|---|---|---|
| Conservative | **William Hunter** | **568** | **41.55%** | | unknown |
| Liberal | Charles Franklin Nelson | 471 | 34.46% | | unknown |
| Federated Labour Party ^{2} | Alfred Harvey Smith | 328 | 23.99% | | unknown |
| Total valid votes | | 1,367 | 100.00% | | |
| Total rejected ballots | | | | | |
| | | 76.94% | | | |
^{2} Also referred to as "O.B.U." (One Big Union) candidate

== See also ==
- List of British Columbia provincial electoral districts
- Canadian provincial electoral districts
- List of electoral districts in the Kootenays
