= George Samuel Hanes =

Canadian politician (1882–1957)

George Samuel Hanes (1882 – October 15, 1957) was an engineer and political figure in British Columbia. He represented North Vancouver from 1916 to 1924 in the Legislative Assembly of British Columbia as a Liberal and then as an Independent.

He was born in Olinda, Essex County, Ontario and was educated at the University of Toronto's School of Practical Science, receiving a B.Sc. In 1906, he was named engineer for the city of Windsor. Hanes married Ella Douglas James in 1907. He moved to North Vancouver after being named city engineer in 1909, serving until 1912. From 1913 to 1916, he was mayor of North Vancouver. He was elected to the assembly in 1916 and reelected in 1920. In 1920, Hanes ran as an Independent but was endorsed by the North Vancouver City Liberal Association and the Great War Veterans Association; Benjamin Chubb, running as the Liberal candidate, was repudiated by the North Vancouver City Liberal Association. Hanes was defeated when he ran for reelection in 1924 as an Independent Liberal. In 1918, he served as a lieutenant in the Canadian Engineering Regiment of the Canadian Expeditionary Force. From 1924 to 1936, he was again city engineer for North Vancouver. He also served as consulting engineer for the Burrard Inlet Tunnel and Bridge Company. During World War II, Hanes served as an engineer during the construction of RCAF equipment depots in Calgary and military defense works at Prince Rupert, Tofino, and Port Hardy. From 1943 to 1945, he was city engineer for Prince Rupert. Hanes died in North Vancouver at the age of 74.
