= William Hunter (Canadian politician) =

Canadian politician (1858–1939)

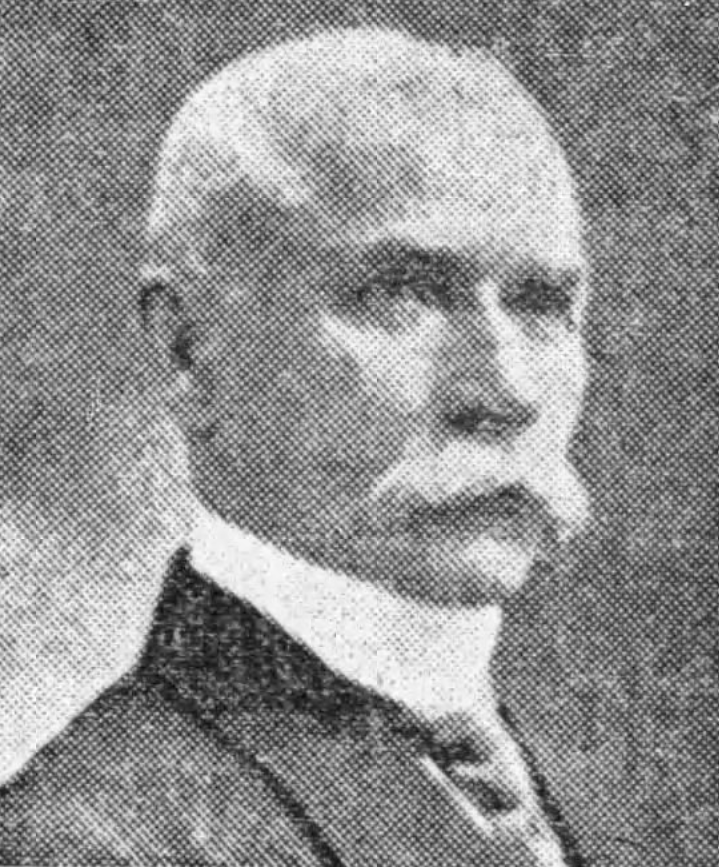

MLA for Slocan
- In office 1907–1916
- Preceded by: William Davidson
- Succeeded by: Charles Franklin Nelson
- In office 1920–1924
- Preceded by: Charles Franklin Nelson
- Succeeded by: none

Personal details
- Born: September 28, 1858 Hemmingford, Canada East
- Died: March 8, 1939 (aged 80) Silverton, British Columbia
- Party: Socialist Party of British Columbia
- Spouse: Maggie Parsons (m. 1901)
- Occupation: Businessman

William Hunter (September 28, 1858 – March 8, 1939) was a businessman and political figure in British Columbia. He represented Slocan from 1907 to 1916 and from 1920 to 1924 in the Legislative Assembly of British Columbia as a Conservative.

He was born in Hemmingford, Canada East in 1858, the son of William Hunter and Janet Mackay, and was educated on Prince Edward Island. In 1884, Hunter came to British Columbia, where he was employed in railway construction for two years. He then worked at bridge building in Washington state until 1889, when he moved to Nelson. Hunter was involved in mining for a year. He next built the International Hotel in Nelson, selling the hotel after operating it for five months. He then operated as a general merchant in New Denver. In 1891, he moved to the future site of the town of Silverton and built a steamship to operate on Slocan Lake. Two years later, he opened a store in Silverton. Hunter later opened a number of branch stores in the region. He was also involved in mining and served as a justice of the peace for Silverton. In 1901, he married Maggie Parsons.

Hunter ran unsuccessfully for a seat in the provincial assembly in 1903 before being elected in 1907. He was reelected two more times, then was defeated by Charles Franklin Nelson when he ran for reelection in 1916, losing by one vote. In 1920, Hunter defeated Nelson to win the Slocan seat. He did not seek a fifth term in the Legislature in the 1924 provincial election.

He died in Silverton at the age of 80.
