= William Oliver Rose =

Canadian politician (1871–1936)

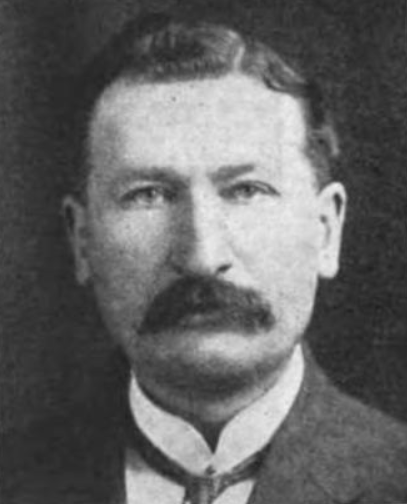

Member of the Legislative Assembly of British Columbia
- In office 1916–1921
- Constituency: Nelson

Personal details
- Born: February 10, 1871 Lakesville, Prince Edward Island
- Died: March 4, 1936 (aged 65) Nelson, British Columbia
- Party: Conservative
- Spouse: Azza Jean Brownell (m. 1901)
- Occupation: Physician, politician

William Oliver Rose (February 10, 1871 – March 4, 1936) was an educator, physician and political figure in British Columbia. He represented Nelson in the Legislative Assembly of British Columbia from 1916 to 1921 as a Conservative.

== Biography ==
Born in Lakesville, Prince Edward Island, the son of William Rose and Jane Baker, he taught school there and in Manitoba before studying medicine at McGill University. He graduated in 1898 and served at the Royal Victoria Hospital, later moving to Nelson, British Columbia. Rose served as alderman and mayor for Nelson. In 1921, he ran unsuccessfully for a seat in the Canadian House of Commons in the riding of Kootenay West.

Rose married Azza Jean Brownell on August 28, 1901.

He died in Nelson on March 4, 1936.
