= James Hargrave Schofield =

Canadian politician

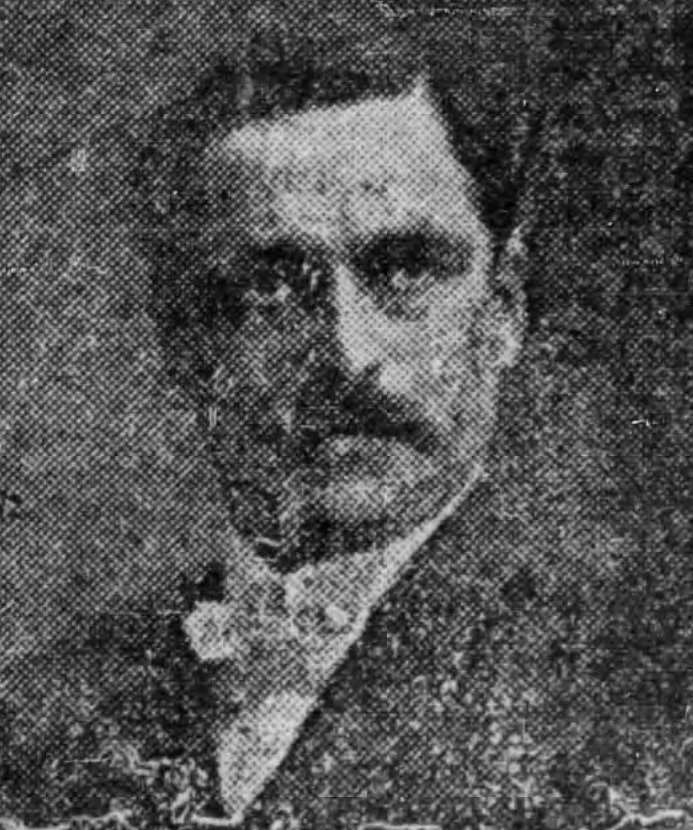

Member of the Legislative Assembly of British Columbia
- In office 1916–1933
- Constituency: Trail and Rossland-Trail

Member of the Legislative Assembly of British Columbia
- In office 1907–1916
- Constituency: Ymir

Mayor of Trail, British Columbia
- In office 1902–1907

Personal details
- Born: James Hargrave Alcock Schofield; February 19, 1866 Brockville, Canada West
- Died: December 9, 1938 (aged 72) Trail, British Columbia
- Party: Conservative
- Occupation: Businessman, politician

James Hargrave Alcock Schofield (February 19, 1866 – December 9, 1938) was a lumberman and political figure in British Columbia. He represented Ymir from 1907 to 1916, Trail from 1916 to 1924 and Rossland-Trail from 1924 to 1933 in the Legislative Assembly of British Columbia as a Conservative. He did not seek an eighth term in the Legislature in the 1933 provincial election.

He was born in Brockville, Canada West, the son of Frederick Schofield and Letitia L. Hargrave, and the grandson of Letitia MacTavish Hargrave. He was educated in Port Hope. Schofield was mayor of Trail from 1902 to 1907.

He died at his home in Trail on December 9, 1938.
