= Rossland (electoral district) =

Defunct provincial electoral district in British Columbia, Canada

Rossland was the name of a provincial electoral district in the Canadian province of British Columbia located in the West Kootenay region. It is named after the town of Rossland, near Trail. It made its first appearance on the hustings in the election of 1916. Its predecessor riding was Rossland City (1903–1912) and from 1924 it was succeeded by the riding of Rossland-Trail.

== Electoral history ==
Note: Winners of each election are in bold.

14th British Columbia election, 1916
Party	Candidate	Votes	%	±	Expenditures
Conservative	Lorne Argyle Campbell	336	44.21%		unknown
**Liberal**	**William David Willson**	**424**	**55.79%**		unknown
Total valid votes		760	100.00%		
Total rejected ballots					
Turnout		%			
^{1} Parr may have been a Labour candidate although Gosnell labels him a Liberal; he may have campaigned as both.

15th British Columbia election, 1920
Party	Candidate	Votes	%	±	Expenditures
Federated Labour Party ^{1}	George Alexander Dingwall	239	35.36 %		unknown
Conservative	**William Kemble Esling**	**257**	**38.02%**		unknown
Liberal	John Allan McLeod	180	26.63%		unknown
Total valid votes		676	100.00%		
Total rejected ballots					
Turnout		%			
^{1} Also referred to as "Farmer-Labour" because of farmer support.

Redistribution following the 1920 election resulted in the renaming of the riding to Rossland-Trail for the 1924 election.

== See also ==
- List of British Columbia provincial electoral districts
- Canadian provincial electoral districts
- List of electoral districts in the Kootenays
