= Rossland City =

Defunct provincial electoral district in British Columbia, Canada

Rossland City was the name of a provincial electoral district in the Canadian province of British Columbia, located in the West Kootenay region. It is named after the town of Rossland, near Trail. It made its first appearance on the hustings in the election of 1903 and lasted only until 1912, after which the revised riding was simply Rossland.

== Electoral history ==
Note: Winners of each election are in bold.

10th British Columbia election, 1903
Party	Candidate	Votes	%	±	Expenditures
Conservative	Arthur Samuel Goodeve	343	44.03%		unknown
**Liberal**	**James Alexander MacDonald**	**436**	**55.97%**		unknown
Total valid votes		779	100.00%		
Total rejected ballots					
Turnout		%			
^{1} Parr may have been a Labour candidate although Gosnell labels him a Liberal; he may have campaigned as both.

11th British Columbia election, 1907
Party	Candidate	Votes	%	±	Expenditures
Socialist	Archibald Francis Berry	98	18.67%	–	unknown
Conservative	Lorne Argyle Campbell	186	35.43%		unknown
Liberal	**James Alexander MacDonald**	**241**	**45.90%**		unknown
Total valid votes		525	100.00%		
Total rejected ballots					
Turnout		%			

12th British Columbia election, 1909
Party	Candidate	Votes	%	±	Expenditures
Conservative	**William Robert Braden**	**237**	**38.60%**		unknown
Socialist	George Bernard Casey	160	26.06%	–	unknown
Liberal	John M. English	217	35.34%		unknown
Total valid votes		614	100.00%		
Total rejected ballots					
Turnout		%			

13th British Columbia election, 1912
Party	Candidate	Votes	%	±	Expenditures
Conservative	**Lorne Argyle Campbell**	**336**	**56.09%**		unknown
Socialist	George Bernard Casey	95	15.86%	–	unknown
**Liberal**	Louis Denison Taylor	168	28.05%		unknown
Total valid votes		599	100.00%		
Total rejected ballots					
Turnout		%			

Redistribution following the 1912 election resulted in the renaming of the riding to Rossland.

== See also ==
- List of British Columbia provincial electoral districts
- Canadian provincial electoral districts
- List of electoral districts in the Kootenays
