= 40th Parliament of British Columbia =

2013–2017 session of the Legislative Assembly

- Majority parliament
- Jun. 26, 2013 – Apr. 11, 2017

Parliament leaders
- Premier: Christy Clark; March 14, 2011 – July 18, 2017
- Cabinet: C. Clark II
- Leader of the Opposition: Adrian Dix; April 17, 2011 – May 4, 2014
- John Horgan; May 4, 2014 – July 18, 2017

Party caucuses
- Government: Liberal Party
- Opposition: New Democratic Party
- Unrecognized: Green Party

Legislative Assembly
- Speaker of the Assembly: Linda Reid; June 26, 2013 – March 16, 2017
- Government House leader: Michael de Jong; 2012–2017
- Members: 85 MLA seats

Sovereign
- Monarch: Elizabeth II; February 6, 1952 – present
- Lieutenant governor: Judith Guichon; November 2, 2012 – April 24, 2018

Sessions
- 1st session June 26, 2013 – February 11, 2014
- 2nd session February 11, 2014 – October 6, 2014
- 3rd session October 6, 2014 – February 10, 2015
- 4th session February 10, 2015 – February 9, 2016
- 5th session February 9, 2016 – February 14, 2017
- 6th session February 14, 2017 – March 16, 2017
← 39th	→ 41st

The 40th Parliament of British Columbia was in session from June 26, 2013, to April 11, 2017. It consisted of the Legislative Assembly of British Columbia, as elected by the general election of May 14, 2013, and the Queen represented by Lieutenant Governor Judith Guichon. That election unexpectedly returned the BC Liberal Party to another majority government, their fourth consecutive government since 2001, this time with Christy Clark who had been premier since 2011. The BC New Democratic Party formed the official opposition under Adrian Dix and John Horgan who replaced Dix in the 2014 leadership election. The first member of the Legislative Assembly (MLA) from the Green Party of BC, Andrew J. Weaver served in this parliament, along with independent Vicki Huntington. Three MLAs resigned: Jenny Kwan and Douglas Horne who resigned to stand in a federal election, as well as Ben Stewart who resigned for the purpose of providing the Premier, who had lost her seat in the general election, with another opportunity to gain a seat. The by-elections to replace the resigned members Clark won Stewart's Kelowna riding, while Melanie Mark and Jodie Wickens replaced Kwan and Horne, respectively. The only members to leave their party, Marc Dalton briefly left the BC Liberals as he unsuccessfully sought the Conservative Party nomination in the federal election, and Pat Pimm left the BC Liberal Party just prior to being arrested.

Legislative initiatives which were part of 2013 BC Liberal election platform included major amendments to liquor laws, local government elections, and holding a plebiscite on TransLink funding. The BC Liberal election priority of fostering a liquefied natural gas (LNG) industry involved the creation of the Liquefied Natural Gas Income Tax Act, the Greenhouse Gas Industrial Reporting and Control Act which provides exemptions for LNG facilities and replaces the existing cap and trade regime, amendments to the Protected Areas of British Columbia Act to make way for pipelines through parks and other protected areas, and various amendments to the Natural Gas Development Statutes Act (formerly the Petroleum and Natural Gas Act). Other major legislation included the adoption of the Water Sustainability Act, creation of a licensing system for all-terrain vehicle and snowmobiles in the Off-Road Vehicle Act, adding electronic cigarette to the Tobacco and Vapour Products Control Act, modernizing the Societies Act, amendments to the Motor Dealer Act to prohibit online sales of vehicles, creation of a new provincial park called the Ancient Forest/Chun T'oh Whudujut Park, and adoption of the Great Bear Rainforest (Forest Management) Act that limited commercial logging in the Great Bear Rainforest. Other new legislation included making discrimination based on gender identity or expression illegal, and creating a 15% property transfer tax that only applies to foreign nationals in Metro Vancouver.

In preparation for the next general election, legislation was adopted to increase the number of MLAs to 87, delete pre-campaign expense limits, allow constituency associations to incur election expenses, require dissemination of the identity of those who voted in the last election, and limited the update to voter registration information. The 40th parliament of British Columbia was formally dissolved on April 11, 2017, by request of the premier to the lieutenant governor making way for the 41st British Columbia general election set for May 9, 2017.

== Elections and appointments ==
The members of the legislative assembly were elected in the 40th general election, held on May 14, 2013. The BC Liberal Party unexpectedly elected an expanded majority, their fourth consecutive absolute majority. To accommodate party leader Christy Clark who lost her seat, Ben Stewart resigned his Westside-Kelowna seat. Clark won the Westside-Kelowna by-election on July 10. Regardless of not having a seat in the legislative assembly, Clark, as leader of the party with the most seats, was Premier. She named Rich Coleman as Deputy Premier and Minister of Natural Gas Development. In her cabinet, she kept Mike de Jong as Minister of Finance (as well as government house leader), Steve Thomson as Minister of Forests, Lands and Natural Resource Operations, and Stephanie Cadieux as Minister of Children and Family Development. Clark shuffled Bill Bennett, Mary Polak, Shirley Bond, Don McRae, Terry Lake, and Naomi Yamamoto to different ministries while Norm Letnick, Ralph Sultan and Moira Stilwell were removed from cabinet. New members who Clark immediately appointed to her cabinet included Peter Fassbender as Minister of Education, Amrik Virk as Minister of Advanced Education, Suzanne Anton as Minister of Justice, Todd Stone as Minister of Transportation and Infrastructure, Teresa Wat as Minister of International Trade, Coralee Oakes as Minister of Community, Sport and Cultural Development, and Andrew Wilkinson as Minister of Technology, Innovation and Citizen Services. Veteran members John Rustad and Pat Pimm were also added to cabinet. Premier Clark issued mandate letters to each minister outlining priorities and expectations.

The Constitution Act states that the next general election had to occur no later than the second Tuesday in May, four years after the last general election. Accordingly, the 40th parliament was dissolved on April 11, 2017, by request of the premier to the lieutenant governor making way for the 41st British Columbia general election which was then scheduled for May 9, 2017.

== First session ==
The first session of the 40th Parliament began on June 26, 2013, with the Speech from the Throne delivered by Lieutenant-Governor Judith Guichon. This brief session was held only to pass a budget for the remainder of the fiscal year. The budget was largely the same as the BC Liberals had introduced in February as a pre-election budget. It increased the general corporate income tax rate from 10% to 11%, inserted a new top tax bracket applicable for the 2014 and 2015 years only, increased tax on cigarettes and tobacco, and exempted coloured fuel from the carbon tax.

== Second session ==
The second session opened on February 11, 2014, following a six-month recess. During the session 26 bills were given royal assent, all on or before May 29. Following through on campaign promises, a plebiscite on TransLink funding was set up with the South Coast British Columbia Transportation Authority Funding Referenda Act, the first of several new liquor laws were passed with the Liquor Control and Licensing Amendment Act and its accompanying regulations, which among other items allowed for sales of liquor at grocery stores and farmers' markets, and recommendations of the Missing Women Commission of Inquiry were implemented with the Missing Persons Act. To facilitate natural gas industry, the budget committed $29 million to the government's LNG strategy program, the Park Act and the Park Boundary Adjustment Policy were amended to allow more industrial activities within provincial parks, and the Natural Gas Development Statutes Amendment Act modernized the Petroleum and Natural Gas Act and revised the ability of land owners to appeal decisions concerning placement of wells, pipelines and facilities on their property.

The Minister of Agriculture Pat Pimm introduced the Animal Health Act updating the laws concerning agricultural biosecurity and amendments to the Agricultural Land Commission Act which controversially divided the ALR into two zones, each with different regulations and application decision-making criteria. Citing health issues, Pimm resigned from cabinet in April and was replaced by Norm Letnick who had served previously as agriculture minister in 2012–13. Michelle Stilwell was promoted to cabinet to replace Letnick's position of Minister of Social Development and Social Innovation.

The Water Sustainability Act modernized the laws regarding water management. The Off-Road Vehicle Act created the requirement that all-terrain vehicles and snowmobiles be registered and licensed. The Provincial Capital Commission Dissolution Act closed the Provincial Capital Commission. The Local Elections Campaign Financing Act and the Local Elections Statutes Amendment Act placed new regulations on local elections, like extending the terms of mayor and councils to four years from three, establishing spending limits, and requiring registration of third-party advertisers. The Protected Areas of British Columbia Amendment Act, 2014, removed 11 ha from Indian Arm Provincial Park and 10 ha from Elk Falls Provincial Park and added 47,873 ha to four existing conservancies. The government tabled back-to-work legislation regarding a strike action at the Port of Vancouver but did not pass it as the strike ended.

== Third session ==
A short third session was held in October–November 2014 responding to requests by proponents of the liquefied natural gas industry to fast-track legislation. The Liquefied Natural Gas Income Tax Act established the taxation regime at 1.5% of net income until capital costs have been paid, then 3.5% afterwards, significantly less than the original 7% that the government had been planning. The Greenhouse Gas Industrial Reporting and Control Act repealed the Greenhouse Gas Reduction (Cap and Trade) Act in favour of intensity level emission limits, instead total emission measures, and the act set the emission limit at 0.16 carbon dioxide equivalent tonnes for each tonne of LNG produced. The Protected Areas of British Columbia Amendment Act (No. 2), 2014, removed 63 hectares from the Nisga'a Memorial Lava Bed Park to accommodate a pipeline to one of the proposed LNG facilities.

Also, the Container Trucking Act, which created the office of the British Columbia Container Trucking Commissioner, was adopted as a result of the negotiations in the previous session's response to the Port of Vancouver strike. The Canadian Pacific Railway (Stone and Timber) Settlement Act extinguished all of Canadian Pacific Limited's stone and timber reservations in exchange for $19 million.

== Fourth session ==
Prior to the fourth session, the Premier added Mike Bernier to cabinet as Minister of Education. The former Minister of Education Peter Fassbender took over Coralee Oakes's position as Minister of Community, Sport and Cultural Development, as well as taking over responsibility for TransLink from Todd Stone's Ministry of Transportation and Infrastructure. Oakes was assigned to be Minister of Small Business, Red Tape Reduction and responsible for the liquor distribution branch. Naomi Yamamoto was moved from Minister of State for Tourism and Small Business was moved over to the newly created Minister of State for Emergency Preparedness. Both Jenny Kwan and Douglas Horne resigned as MLAs in order to pursue election in the federal general election.

The fourth session ran between February and November 2015 and saw 42 bills become law. The previous session's legislation concerning LNG taxation was furthered with the Liquefied Natural Gas Income Tax Amendment Act, 2015, and the Liquefied Natural Gas Project Agreements Act exempted for 25 years LNG facilities from increases in tax and greenhouse gas regulatory changes. The Federal Port Development Act implemented a recently added provision of the Canada Marine Act that enables provincial regulations to be administered on federal port lands. In addition to allowing residential tenants to cancel a rental agreement in instances of domestic violence, the Natural Gas Development Statutes Amendment Act, 2015, expanded the list of activities that are defined as an "oil and gas activity", with the Miscellaneous Statutes Amendment Act, 2015, further expanding the list and extended the maximum duration of royalty agreements for extracting natural gas. The miscellaneous statutes act also created the Medal of Good Citizenship, repealed the Shelter Aid for Elderly Renters Act, and allowed the Queen's Printer to contract out its printing duties and further implemented aspects of the Liquor Policy Review. Additionally, in response to the Liquor Policy Review, there was a major update to the Liquor Control and Licensing Act.

The Red Tape Reduction Day Act recognized the second Wednesday of March as Red Tape Reduction Day. The Amendments to the Finance Statutes Act allowed ICBC to withhold issuance or renewal of driver's license to those with delinquent student loan repayments or child support payments or unpaid court fines. The Motor Vehicle Amendment Act, 2015, made driving in the left lane of a highway a ticketable offense if not using it to pass another vehicle or turning off the highway. This amendment act also now requires winter tires be stamped with a specialized (e.g. snowflake or mountain) symbol. The Guide Dog and Service Dog Act created a Registrar of guide dogs and service dogs requiring that such dogs be certified; those with certified dogs have the right, despite any 'no pet policy', to housing and to enter places where the public is invited (e.g. stores, transit). Two amendments to the Workers Compensation Act implemented the recommendations made by WorkSafeBC and the BC Coroner's Office following the 2012 sawmill explosions that killed four people.

The Tobacco Control Act was expanded to include vapour products and renamed to Tobacco and Vapour Products Control Act. The Fish and Seafood Act replaced and modernized the Fisheries Act and the Fish Inspection Act. The Societies Act updated and replaced the Society Act. The Franchises Act was created based on recommendations from the BC Law Institute and the Canadian Bar Association of BC to imposes a duty of fair dealing for franchise agreements, allowing franchises to associate with other franchises, and allowing franchisees to sue for damages in event of misrepresentation by a parent company.

The Information Management Act created the position of Chief Records Officer to oversee digitizing government archives. The Provincial Immigration Programs Act created the position of Director of Provincial Immigration Programs for administering immigration agreements with the federal government. The Auditor General for Local Government Amendment Act, 2015, required the appointment of a deputy auditor general and expanded upon the provisions for suspending or removing an individual from the position of auditor general.

Revisions to the Electoral Districts Act and the Election Act increased the number of electoral districts and MLAs to 87 and deleted expense limits that applied to the pre-campaign period, now allows constituency associations to incur election expenses, only permits updates to voter registration information in conjunction with voting and only with a family member present to vouch, and requires the Chief Electoral Officer to provide each political party the list of voters in the last election with identification of who voted.

== Fifth session ==
The fifth session took place between February and July 2016. Prior to the session beginning, Mike Morris was added to the cabinet under a new position titled Minister of Public Safety and Solicitor General. The 2016 budget created the Prosperity Fund and required any increase in general funds either be used to reduce operating debt or held in the Prosperity Fund. The budget increased the property transfer tax increase (from 2% to 3%) on homes over $2 million but increased the exemption threshold for new houses to $750,000. The budget also exempted children from paying Medical Services Premium, created a farmers' food donation tax credit, extended both the mining tax credit and the tax credit for home renovations by seniors of persons with disabilities, expanded of the film tax credit to include animation productions, mandated lower assessment values be placed on rural tourist accommodations, and made funds available to compensate property owners impacted by wildfire control.

Affecting an LNG industry, the Greenhouse Gas Industrial Reporting and Control Amendment Act, 2016, exempted new facilities from reporting emissions for the first 18 months of operations and expanded eligibility to participate in the BC carbon registry; and the Safety Standards Act was amended to move administration of safety standards in the oil and gas sector from the BC Safety Authority to the Oil and Gas Commission. Affecting pipelines, land was removed from Finn Creek Provincial Park to accommodate the Kinder Morgan Trans Mountain Pipeline System and an amendment to the Environmental Management Act created a requirement for regulated industries, like oil pipelines, to have spill contingency plans.

New legislation included the Great Bear Rainforest (Forest Management) Act which limits commercial logging in the Great Bear Rainforest. the Profits of Criminal Notoriety Act prevents people from being paid to recount crime or profiting from crime memorabilia. The Sexual Violence and Misconduct Policy Act, originally introduced by Andrew J. Weaver of the Green Party as the Post-Secondary Sexual Violence Policies Act, was adopted by the government and requires post-secondary institutions to put in place a sexual misconduct policy.

Legislative amendments included an amendment to the Motor Dealer Act which prohibits selling new vehicles using the Internet, prohibits motor dealers from employing unlicensed salespeople, and creates the Motor Dealer Consumer Advancement Fund; the Pharmacy Operations and Drug Scheduling Amendment Act, 2016, expands the jurisdiction of the College of Pharmacists of BC to include licensing of pharmacy owners; an amendment to the Forests, Lands and Natural Resource Operations Statutes Act adds unintended actions to the definition of interference; the Community Care and Assisted Living Amendment Act, 2016, enacted some recommendations from the Office of the Seniors Advocate to allows partners not legally married but having lived together for 2 years to qualify as spouses and removes the upper limit of how many services a residence can provide to a client before the client must be referred to a complex care home; the Local Elections Campaign Financing (Election Expenses) Amendment Act, 2016, enacted the recommendations of the Special Committee on Local Elections Expense Limits to shorten the election period from 46 to 28 days and create a regulatory system for limiting and reporting campaign expenses during elections for mayor, councils, school boards, and electoral area directors; the Protected Areas of British Columbia Amendment Act, 2016 created a new 11,190-hectare park called Ancient Forest/Chun T'oh Whudujut Park; and the Miscellaneous Statutes (General) Amendment Act, 2016, created a requirement that the Agricultural Land Commission could not remove land from the ALR without property owner consent, amended the Income Tax Act to reduce film tax credits, amended the Environmental Management Act to allow the Minister of Environment to order a director to issue or amend a permit to allow for the discharging of waste into the environment within an area-based management plan (for a mining operation).

Two additional laws were introduced and passed in late July. The Human Rights Code Amendment Act, 2016 made discrimination based on gender identity or expression illegal. The Miscellaneous Statutes (Housing Priority Initiatives) Amendment Act, 2016 (Bill 28) created a 15% property transfer tax that applies only to foreign nationals buying real estate in Metro Vancouver, authorized the City of Vancouver to tax vacant residential properties and amended the Real Estate Services Act

== Sixth session ==
Prior to the beginning of the session, Pat Pimm left the BC Liberal caucus following his arrest in a domestic dispute and sat as an independent for the remainder of the parliament. With the general election set for May, the governing BC Liberals introduced, but did not adopt, a [pre-election budget (Bill 8) in February that proposed to reduce Medical Services Plan fees by 50%, reduce the small business corporate tax rate from 2.5% to 2%, create a 'BC back-to-school tax credit' and a 'volunteer firefighter or search and rescue volunteer tax credit', extend the tax credits provided for book publishing, scientific research and experimental development, increase the first time home buyer tax exemption threshold from $475,000 to $500,000, and increase the tobacco tax rate from 23.9 to 24.7¢ per cigarette.

The Minister Responsible for Asia Pacific Strategy and Multiculturalism Teresa Wat introduced the Discriminatory Provisions (Historical Wrongs) Repeal Act that repealed sections from 19 acts, adopted between 1881 and 1930, that discriminated against some ethnic groups. An amendment to the Prevention of Cruelty to Animals Act creates licensing and standards of care requirements for pet breeders. The Information Management (Documenting Government Decisions) Amendment Act, 2017 legislated a duty for provincial public agencies to document information.

== Members of the 40th Parliament ==
Member	Party	Electoral district	First elected / previously elected	Term number
Darryl Plecas	Liberal	Abbotsford South	2013	1
Mike de Jong	Liberal	Abbotsford West	1994	6
Simon Gibson	Liberal	Abbotsford-Mission	2013	1
Scott Fraser	NDP	Alberni-Pacific Rim	2005	3
Linda Larson	Liberal	Boundary-Similkameen	2013	1
Kathy Corrigan	NDP	Burnaby-Deer Lake	2009	2
Raj Chouhan	NDP	Burnaby-Edmonds	2005	3
Jane Shin	NDP	Burnaby-Lougheed	2013	1
Richard Lee	Liberal	Burnaby North	2001	4
Donna Barnett	Liberal	Cariboo-Chilcotin	2009	2
Coralee Oakes	Liberal	Cariboo North	2013	1
John Martin	Liberal	Chilliwack	2013	1
Laurie Throness	Liberal	Chilliwack-Hope	2013	1
Norm Macdonald	NDP	Columbia River-Revelstoke	2005	3
Don McRae	Liberal	Comox Valley	2009	2
Douglas Horne (to August 11, 2015)	Liberal	Coquitlam-Burke Mountain	2009	2
Jodie Wickens (from February 2, 2016)	NDP	Coquitlam-Burke Mountain	2016	1
Selina Robinson	NDP	Coquitlam-Maillardville	2013	1
Bill Routley	NDP	Cowichan Valley	2009	2
Scott Hamilton	Liberal	Delta North	2013	1
Vicki Huntington	Independent	Delta South	2009	2
Maurine Karagianis	NDP	Esquimalt-Royal Roads	2005	3
Rich Coleman	Liberal	Fort Langley-Aldergrove	1996	5
Jackie Tegart	Liberal	Fraser-Nicola	2013	1
John Horgan	NDP	Juan de Fuca	2005	3
Terry Lake	Liberal	Kamloops-North Thompson	2009	2
Todd Stone	Liberal	Kamloops-South Thompson	2013	1
Norm Letnick	Liberal	Kelowna-Lake Country	2009	2
Steve Thomson	Liberal	Kelowna-Mission	2009	2
Bill Bennett	Liberal	Kootenay East	2001	4
Katrine Conroy	NDP	Kootenay West	2005	3
Mary Polak	Liberal	Langley	2005	3
Marc Dalton	Liberal (to February 13, 2015)	Maple Ridge-Mission	2009	2
Marc Dalton	Independent	Maple Ridge-Mission	2009	2
Marc Dalton	Liberal (from September 21, 2015)	Maple Ridge-Mission	2009	2
Doug Bing	Liberal	Maple Ridge-Pitt Meadows	2013	1
Leonard Krog	NDP	Nanaimo	1991, (Note: Parksville-Qualicum) 2005	5*
Doug Routley	NDP	Nanaimo-North Cowichan	2005	3
John Rustad	Liberal	Nechako Lakes	2005	3
Michelle Mungall	NDP	Nelson-Creston	2009	2
Judy Darcy	NDP	New Westminster	2013	1
Jennifer Rice	NDP	North Coast	2013	1
Claire Trevena	NDP	North Island	2005	3
Naomi Yamamoto	Liberal	North Vancouver-Lonsdale	2009	2
Jane Thornthwaite	Liberal	North Vancouver-Seymour	2009	2
Andrew Weaver	Green	Oak Bay-Gordon Head	2013	1
Michelle Stilwell	Liberal	Parksville-Qualicum	2013	1
Pat Pimm	Liberal (to August 15, 2016)	Peace River North	2009	2
Pat Pimm	Independent	Peace River North	2009	2
Mike Bernier	Liberal	Peace River South	2013	1
Dan Ashton	Liberal	Penticton	2013	1
Mike Farnworth	NDP	Port Coquitlam	1991, 2005	5*
Linda Reimer	Liberal	Port Moody-Coquitlam	2013	1
Nicholas Simons	NDP	Powell River-Sunshine Coast	2005	3
Mike Morris	Liberal	Prince George-Mackenzie	2013	1
Shirley Bond	Liberal	Prince George-Valemount	2001	4
Teresa Wat	Liberal	Richmond Centre	2013	1
Linda Reid†	Liberal	Richmond East	1991	6
John Yap	Liberal	Richmond-Steveston	2005	3
Gary Holman	NDP	Saanich North and the Islands	2013	1
Lana Popham	NDP	Saanich South	2009	2
Greg Kyllo	Liberal	Shuswap	2013	1
Robin Austin	NDP	Skeena	2005	3
Doug Donaldson	NDP	Stikine	2009	2
Stephanie Cadieux	Liberal	Surrey-Cloverdale	2009	2
Peter Fassbender	Liberal	Surrey-Fleetwood	2013	1
Sue Hammell	NDP	Surrey-Green Timbers	1991, 2005	5*
Harry Bains	NDP	Surrey-Newton	2005	3
Marvin Hunt	Liberal	Surrey-Panorama	2013	1
Amrik Virk	Liberal	Surrey-Tynehead	2013	1
Bruce Ralston	NDP	Surrey-Whalley	2005	3
Gordon Hogg	Liberal	Surrey-White Rock	1997	5
George Heyman	NDP	Vancouver-Fairview	2013	1
Sam Sullivan	Liberal	Vancouver-False Creek	2013	1
Suzanne Anton	Liberal	Vancouver-Fraserview	2013	1
Shane Simpson	NDP	Vancouver-Hastings	2005	3
Mable Elmore	NDP	Vancouver-Kensington	2009	2
Adrian Dix	NDP	Vancouver-Kingsway	2005	3
Moira Stilwell	Liberal	Vancouver-Langara	2009	2
Jenny Kwan (to August 4, 2015)	NDP	Vancouver-Mount Pleasant	1996	5
Melanie Mark (from February 2, 2016)	NDP	Vancouver-Mount Pleasant	2016	1
David Eby	NDP	Vancouver-Point Grey	2013	1
Andrew Wilkinson	Liberal	Vancouver-Quilchena	2013	1
Spencer Chandra Herbert	NDP	Vancouver-West End	2008	3
Eric Foster	Liberal	Vernon-Monashee	2009	2
Carole James	NDP	Victoria-Beacon Hill	2005	3
Rob Fleming	NDP	Victoria-Swan Lake	2005	3
Ralph Sultan	Liberal	West Vancouver-Capilano	2001	4
Jordan Sturdy	Liberal	West Vancouver-Sea to Sky	2013	1
Ben Stewart (to June 5, 2013)	Liberal	Westside-Kelowna	2009	2
Christy Clark (from July 10, 2013)	Liberal	Westside-Kelowna	1996, (Note: Port Moody-Burnaby Mountain) 2011, (Note: Vancouver-Point Grey) 2013	4*

== Party standings of the 40th Parliament ==
=== Seating plan ===
											Chouhan		Rice	Holman	B. Routley
Macdonald	Karagianis	Eby	Mungall	Bains	Elmore	Shin	Heyman	Darcy	Donaldson		Krog	Trevena	D. Routley	Simons	Vacant	WEAVER	Dalton	Martin	Gibson	Mo. Stilwell
	Hammell	Simpson	Robinson	Farnworth	HORGAN	James	Dix	Ralston	Corrigan	Fleming	Popham	Conroy	Austin	Herbert	Fraser	Huntington	Bernier	Larson	Foster
Reid
	Cadieux	Lake	Polak	De Jong	CLARK	Coleman	Anton	Bond	Bennett	Letnick	Barnett	Yap	Thornthwaite	McRae	Plecas	Lee	Kyllo	Tegart	Throness
Yamamoto	Mi. Stilwell	Stone	Fassbender	Oakes	Wat	Thomson	Virk	Rustad	Wilkinson		Pimm	Sultan	Hamilton	Reimer	Ashton	Morris	Hunt	Sullivan
											Vacant		Sturdy	Bing	Hogg

=== Standings changes ===
Number of members per party by date	2013			2015				2016	
Number of members per party by date	May 14	June 5	July 10	February 12	August 4	August 11	August 12	February 2	August 15
Liberal	49	48	49	48		47	48		47
NDP	34				33			35	
Green	1								
Independent	1			2			1		2
Total members	85	84	85		84	83		85	
Vacant	0	1	0		1	2		0	
Government Majority	13	12	13	12	13	12	13	11	10

Membership changes in the 40th Assembly
Date	Name	District	Party	Reason
May 14, 2013	See list of members			Election day of the 40th British Columbia general election
June 11, 2013	Ben Stewart	Westside-Kelowna	Liberal	Resigned to allow party leader Christy Clark to contest the seat in a by-election, following her defeat in Vancouver-Point Grey on election day.
July 10, 2013	Christy Clark	Westside-Kelowna	Liberal	Elected in by-election; Liberal hold.
February 12, 2015	Marc Dalton	Maple Ridge-Mission	Independent	Left BC Liberal caucus to seek Conservative Party of Canada nomination in Pitt Meadows—Maple Ridge.
August 4, 2015	Jenny Kwan	Vancouver-Mount Pleasant	NDP	Resigned to run in the federal election.
August 11, 2015	Douglas Horne	Coquitlam-Burke Mountain	Liberal	Resigned to run in the federal election.
August 12, 2015	Marc Dalton	Maple Ridge-Mission	Liberal	Rejoined BC Liberal caucus after losing Conservative Party of Canada nomination in Pitt Meadows—Maple Ridge.
February 2, 2016	Jodie Wickens	Coquitlam-Burke Mountain	NDP	Elected in by-election; NDP gain
February 2, 2016	Melanie Mark	Vancouver-Mount Pleasant	NDP	Elected in by-election; NDP hold.
August 15, 2016	Pat Pimm	Peace River North	Independent	Left BC Liberal caucus to two days before his arrest.
