= 41st Parliament of British Columbia =

2017 to 2020 session of the British Columbia Legislative Assembly

- Minority parliament
- Jun. 22, 2017 – Sep. 21, 2020

Parliament leaders
- Premier: Christy Clark; March 14, 2011 – July 18, 2017
- John Horgan; July 18, 2017 – November 18, 2022
- Cabinets: C. Clark III; Horgan I
- Leader of the Opposition: John Horgan; May 4, 2014 – July 18, 2017
- Christy Clark; July 18 – August 4, 2017
- Rich Coleman; August 4, 2017 – February 3, 2018
- Andrew Wilkinson; February 3, 2018 – November 21, 2020

Party caucuses
- Government: Liberal (until July 2017) (Note: The Liberal Party briefly formed government but was defeated in a confidence vote on June 29, 2017.)
- New Democratic (after July 2017)
- Opposition: New Democratic (until July 2017)
- Liberal (after July 2017)
- Recognized: Green (Note: The Green Party agreed to provide confidence and supply for the NDP government. It was granted official party status retroactive to October 4, 2017.)

Legislative Assembly
- Seating arrangements of the Legislative Assembly
- Speaker of the Assembly: Steve Thomson; June 22–29, 2017
- Darryl Plecas; September 8, 2017 – December 7, 2020
- Government House leader: Mike de Jong; May 4, 2014 – July 18, 2017
- Mike Farnworth; July 18, 2017 – December 7, 2022
- Opposition House leader: Mike Farnworth; May 4, 2014 – July 18, 2017
- Mike de Jong; July 18, 2017 – September 21, 2020
- Members: 87 MLA seats

Sovereign
- Monarch: Elizabeth II; February 6, 1952 – September 8, 2022
- Lieutenant governor: Judith Guichon; November 2, 2012 – April 24, 2018
- Janet Austin; April 24, 2018 – January 30, 2025

Sessions
- 1st session June 22, 2017 – September 8, 2017
- 2nd session September 8, 2017 – February 13, 2018
- 3rd session February 13, 2018 – February 12, 2019
- 4th session February 12, 2019 – February 11, 2020
- 5th session February 11, 2020 – September 21, 2020
← 40th	→ 42nd

The 41st Parliament of British Columbia was in session from June 22, 2017, to September 21, 2020. It consisted of the Legislative Assembly of British Columbia, as elected by the general election of May 9, 2017, and subsequent by-elections, and the lieutenant governor of British Columbia, representing the Queen of Canada. It was the first parliament following the increase in size of the legislature from 85 to 87 seats. Immediately following the election, Christy Clark, the incumbent premier, asked Lieutenant Governor Judith Guichon if she could continue governing until the final votes were counted and it would be known if there would be a majority or minority government. The lieutenant governor agreed and Clark appointed a cabinet of 21 ministers and 13 parliamentary secretaries, who were sworn in on June 12, 2017.

Although the final vote confirmed that the British Columbia Liberal Party under Clark remained the largest party in the legislative assembly after the election, the British Columbia New Democratic Party, under leader John Horgan, and Green Party of British Columbia, under Andrew Weaver, together held 44 seats (41 NDP and 3 Green) to the Liberals' 43. On May 29, 2017, the Greens announced they had agreed to a confidence and supply accord with the NDP which would allow the NDP to form a minority government.

Clark convened the Legislative Assembly on June 22, 2017, before losing a vote of confidence on June 29. As leader of a party professing it could gain and maintain the confidence of the Legislature, Horgan was then asked to serve as premier by the lieutenant governor and was sworn in, along with his 22-member cabinet, on July 18, 2017.

The minority parliament lasted for three and a half years despite the small combined NDP and Green working majority. The longevity of this one-seat working majority was made possible, in part, due to the expulsion of Abbotsford South MLA Darryl Plecas from the Liberal caucus after Plecas accepted his election as speaker of the legislature. The 41st Parliament ended on September 21, 2020, after Horgan requested the lieutenant governor dissolve the legislature and call a snap election for October 24, 2020, almost exactly one year ahead of the planned fixed date of October 16, 2021.

== Party standings ==
Standings in the 41st British Columbia Parliament
Affiliation	House members	
Affiliation	2017 election results	At dissolution (September 21, 2020)
Liberal	43	41
New Democratic	41	41
Green	3	2
Independent	0	2
Total members	87	86
Total seats	87	

== Election and appointments ==
The members of the legislative assembly were elected in the 41st general election, held on May 9, 2017. The election returned 43 BC Liberals, 41 BC NDP members, and 3 BC Greens. As the leader of the largest party, Christy Clark was offered, by Lieutenant Governor Judith Guichon, the first opportunity to form a government, though the BC Green Party had announced they would support the BC NDP. Clark accepted and appointed 21 members to her Executive Council and 13 parliamentary secretaries. The cabinet was largely the same as the 40th Parliament, but with Sam Sullivan and Linda Reid, as well as newcomers Jordan Sturdy, Ellis Ross, and Jas Johal replacing ministers who had retired or were defeated in the election. This cabinet only served during the Parliament's first session in which it lost a confidence vote and Clark resigned as an MLA, triggering a by-election in the Kelowna West riding.

After the government lost a confidence vote, the Lieutenant Governor refused Premier Clark's request to call an election and offered the second largest party, the BC NDP, the opportunity to form a government. BC NDP leader John Horgan agreed and appointed an Executive Council of 22 members and 6 parliamentary secretaries, including Carole James as deputy premier and Minister of Finance, Adrian Dix as Minister of Health, David Eby as Attorney General, Rob Fleming as Minister of Education, and Michelle Mungall as Minister of Energy, Mines and Petroleum Resources.

== First session ==
The first session of the 41st Parliament began on June 22, 2017, with the Speech from the Throne delivered by Lieutenant Governor Guichon on behalf of the Premier Clark and the BC Liberal government. Acknowledging the split results of the election, the speech included not only BC Liberal election promises but also some from the opposition parties, such as banning corporate and union political donations, a maximum donation limit for individuals, a referendum on electoral reform, repealing the referendum requirement for new TransLink revenue sources, eliminating tolls on the Port Mann Bridge, and raising the carbon tax to $50 a tonne. When the throne speech finally came to a vote on June 26, both the NDP and Green parties introduced and voted for a motion of no confidence, defeating the government. In the meantime, the government had attempted to introduce two bills (one that would have reduced the number of MLAs necessary to form an official party within the legislative assembly from 4 to 3, thereby allowing the BC Green Party to gain such status and another addressing corporate and union political donations) but both were refused first reading.

== Second session ==
The second session began on September 8, 2017, and all bills were provided royal assent by November 30. On September 8, BC Liberal Darryl Plecas accepted the position of Speaker of the Legislative Assembly and a speech from the throne was delivered again by Lieutenant Governor Guichon, this time on behalf of Premier Horgan and the BC NDP government with the support of the Green Party. Plecas was expelled from the BC Liberal the following day as a consequence for accepting the Speaker position; Plecas subsequently sat as an independent and enforced more civility in the legislative assembly.

Legislative amendments related to elections and governance, the Constitution Amendment Act, 2017 (Bill 5) reduced the number of MLAs necessary to form an official party within the legislative assembly from 4 to 2 and changed the fixed election date to October. The Electoral Reform Referendum 2018 Act (Bill 6) requires a referendum respecting a proportional representation voting system be held no later than November 30, 2018. The ban on corporate, union and foreign donations was implemented with the Election Amendment Act, 2017 (Bill 3) and Local Elections Campaign Financing Amendment Act, 2017 (Bill 15) which required all political contributions be made by a resident of British Columbia and sets new maximum donation limits, including limits to third party sponsors, and political spending limits, as well as public subsidies until the year 2022 for the political parties who achieved 5% of the vote in their electoral districts (e.g. the BC NDP, BC Liberal and BC Green parties). The Lobbyists Registration Amendment Act, 2017 (Bill 8) prohibited specified former public office holders (like former members of cabinet, deputy minister, chief executive officers, etc.) from lobbying activities for two years after leaving those positions.

Other bills that were adopted with support from all parties, included the Tenancy Statutes Amendment Act, 2017 (Bill 16) to limit the use of a vacate clause in fixed-term tenancy agreements, limit rent increases imposed at the renewal of fixed-term tenancy agreements to a specified amount (i.e. 2% plus inflation), and increase enforcement abilities against repeat and serious violators of tenancy laws; the Public Safety Statutes Amendment Act, 2017 (Bill 12) to create a system of e-Tickets for driving offences and e-Certificates of service, and validating the practice of impoundment of vehicles as a result of a roadside alcohol test; the Provincial Court Amendment Act, 2017 (Bill 11) to extend the term of judicial appointments from 10 years to 12; the Sheriff Amendment Act, 2017 (Bill 14) to enable sheriffs to collect personal information to a conduct threat or risk assessment; and the Pooled Registered Pension Plans Amendment Act, 2017 (Bill 13) to delete the requirement of print publication of new multilateral agreements.

== Third session ==
The third session began on February 13, 2018, with a new speech from the throne. Ben Stewart joined the legislative assembly as a result of the February 14 by-election in Kelowna West to replace former-Premier Christy Clark. There were no changes to the Executive Council. The Budget Measures Implementation Act, 2018 amended the property transfer tax to cover bare trusts and exempt bankruptcy transactions while increasing the rate paid on the portion of a real estate transaction that is beyond $3 million; created an additional school tax applicable to residential properties assessed above $3 million; created the means for municipalities to issue "revitalization school tax exemptions" for newly constructed rental housing; made online accommodation platform subject to the Provincial Sales Tax and the hotel tax; eliminated the education tax credit and expanded the film incentive tax credit include to scriptwriting; exempted marine diesel fuel used in inter-jurisdictional cruise ships from the motor fuel tax; increased the PST rate payable on passenger vehicles priced over $125,000; increased the tax on tobacco, and made requirements for additional information regarding residency to claim homeowner grant and property tax deferrals for the purpose of better enforcement. The budget passed on a vote of 44 in favour, 41 opposed. Another budget bill, Bill 44, created – on a 44 to 38 vote – a new payroll tax, on payrolls over $500,000, to replace the Medical Services premium. In a 43 to 42 vote, Bill 51 was adopted to update and modernize the Environmental Assessment Act. In a 43 to 31 vote, the Insurance (Vehicle) Amendment Act, 2018 was passed to limit ICBC accident benefit coverage for minor injuries and to increase the maximum payable limit for other injuries, including adding new coverage for various health care services. Related to the ICBC reforms, Bill 22 expanded the jurisdiction of the Civil Resolution Tribunal to include certain ICBC claim disputes.

Legislative amendments related to housing included Bill 45, which created the Speculation and Vacancy Tax, applicable to unoccupied residential properties in Metro Vancouver, the Capital Regional District, parts of the Fraser Valley Regional District and several other municipalities. Bill 12 addressed "renovictions" by extending the mandatory notice of eviction from 2 to 4 months, legally giving evicted tenants the right of first refusal for the renovated unit, increasing compensation a landlord found guilty of a bad-faith eviction must pay from 2 to 12 months' rent, as well as increasing compensation evicted tenants of manufactured home parks receive from 12 months pad rental to a prescribed sum related to the cost of moving the dwelling. Bill 25 amended the Real Estate Development Marketing Act to address pre-sale condo flipping by requiring developer consent to such activity and making it subject to property transfer tax. Amendments affecting local governments were contained in Bill 18, which requires local governments to collect and report information on housing, such as the available housing stock, and Bill 23, which gives local governments the ability to require, under a zoning regulation, that rental be the only form of occupancy permitted in specified units of multifamily residential developments.

In preparation of the impending legalization of recreational cannabis by the federal government, the Cannabis Control and Licensing Act, the Cannabis Distribution Act, and the Motor Vehicle Amendment Act, 2018, created a legal framework, including a minimum age of 19 for possession, the province acting as the sole wholesale distributor, sales being accommodated in either public or private retail stores, prohibition of smoking in all the same areas where tobacco smoking is prohibited as well as within vehicles, provisions to deal with drug-affected driving, and the establishment of a new provincial cannabis safety unit. Other legislation related to health included the creation of the Voluntary Blood Donations Act (Bill 29) to prohibit payment for blood donations, subject to certain exemptions; related to the opioid epidemic, the Pill Press and Related Equipment Control Act (Bill 27) to limit who can lawfully own a pill press and to allow for a registry of equipment to be maintained by the government; the Opioid Damages and Health Care Costs Recovery Act (Bill 38) to allow the provincial government to launch an aggregate action lawsuit against opioid manufacturers and wholesalers who misled the public concerning the addictive and harmful nature of opioids; and the Workers Compensation Act was amended to add a new mental disorder presumption for first responders and, at the request of the federal government, extended cancer presumptions to federally employed firefighters.

Without division, Bill 47 repealed the 37th Parliament's Health and Social Services Delivery Improvement Act and the Health Sector Partnerships Agreement Act which enabled contract-flipping in the healthcare sector, Bill 50 re-established the Human Rights Commission for British Columbia which had been abolished by the same Parliament, and Bill 41 repealed the 37th Parliament's Public Education Flexibility and Choice Act which had removed the BC Teachers' Federation ability to negotiate class size and composition, and had led to teacher strikes, but was mostly struck down by the Supreme Court of Canada. Bill 55 created provisions to allow all types of vehicle for hire companies to operate in British Columbia. The Public Interest Disclosure Act (Bill 28) was adopted to protect whistleblowers as recommended in the Ombudsperson's Misfire report concerning the inappropriate employment terminations within the Ministry of Health – Bill 13 was also implemented a recommendation of the same report, in this case to allow for the Merit Commissioner to review the process used in any dismissal within the public service. Bill 26 amended the Child, Family and Community Service Act to provide indigenous communities with the opportunity for greater involvement in child welfare decisions and to create a right, that must be considered in decision-making, for an indigenous child to learn about the practice of the child's indigenous traditions, customs and language. Bill 34 renamed the Greenhouse Gas Reduction Targets Act to the Climate Change Accountability Act and replaced the 2020 emission reduction target of 33 percent with a 2030 reduction target of 40 percent below 2007 levels.

Other significant legislative amendments, adopted with all party support, included the Employment Standards Amendment Act, 2018, which created a job-protected leave of absence that parents of a child who has gone missing can take (52 weeks unpaid leave) and extended the leave of absence parents of a child who has died can take from 3 days to 104 weeks, as well as amendments in response to expansions of compassionate care, maternity and parental benefits by the federal government. The Temporary Foreign Worker Protection Act (Bill 48) created a licensing program for recruiters and employers of foreign worker and allows for the recovery of unauthorized fees charged by recruiters. Bill 11 modernized the province's International Commercial Arbitration Act by bringing it in line with guidelines of the UN Commission on International Trade Law and Bill 21 brought the province's legislation concerning opting in or out of class action lawsuits into line with the Uniform Law Conference of Canada's guidelines. Bill 15 allows the Oil and Gas Commission to make regulations requiring restoration of inactive wells before the responsible organization claims bankruptcy and to cancel or suspend permits on the basis of applicant's history of non-compliance with restoration; Bill 16 enabled self-regulatory organizations to enforce their decisions with a court order; Bill 4 renamed the BC Innovation Council to "Innovate BC" and expanded its mandate.

== Fourth session ==
The fourth session began on February 12, 2019, with a new speech from the throne. There were no changes to the Executive Council. Sheila Malcolmson joined the legislative assembly as a result of the January 30 by-election in the Nanaimo electoral district to replace Leonard Krog, who resigned to run for Mayor of Nanaimo. BC Liberal Ben Stewart sat as an independent for the two month he was being investigated for an irregular political contribution. Legislative changes resulting from the 2019 budget were implemented in the Budget Measures Implementation Act, 2019, including replacing the "BC early childhood tax benefit" with the "BC child opportunity benefit", making the "BC flow-through mining expenditure tax credit" and the "mining exploration tax credit" permanent, extending or increasing tax credits relating to farmers' food donations, shipbuilding, and small business venture capital, and allowing TransLink to increase the Metro Vancouver fuel tax by 1.5 cents per litre to fund the Phase 2 portion of its 10-Year Investment Plan. The budget passed on a vote of 44 in favour, 39 opposed. In a separate bill, Bill 45, the provincial sales tax payable on vaping products was increased from 7% to 20%. On a 76 to 3 division, with only the Green Party members opposed, Bill 10 repealed the previous parliament's Liquefied Natural Gas Income Tax Act, with its "LNG tax credit" being moved into the Income Tax Act. Three private member's bills, all introduced by Andrew Weaver of the Green Party, were adopted: Bill M-209 allows benefit corporations to be registered in the province, Bill M-206 allows a tenant to terminate a lease if experiencing household violence on the premises, and Bill M-225 makes the fourth Saturday in November Ukrainian Famine and Genocide (Holodomor) Memorial Day. With no division, Bill 20 repealed the Medical Services Plan premium as a head tax (which had been replaced by the payroll tax created in the previous session).

Legislative amendments related to money laundering included Bill 23, which created the Land Owner Transparency Act to require a land-owning corporation, trust or partnership to report beneficial ownership. Relatedly, Bill 24 created the Transparency Register to provide records of registered owners and beneficial owners of corporations to police, regulators and tax authorities. Bill 33 expanded the British Columbia Securities Commission's investigative powers, its ability to collect fines, and its ability to protect whistleblower from retaliatory actions Bills 26 and 37 dissolved the Financial Institutions Commission and created the BC Financial Services Authority, a new crown agency to jointly regulate financial institutions, insurance agencies, and mortgage brokers. Addressing threats from organized crime, the Witness Security Act (Bill 4) was adopted to establish a confidential, voluntary witness security program to supplement the federal version and Bill 13 amended the Community Safety Act to allow a dedicated enforcement unit to accept and investigate confidential complaints about properties that are a threat to the safety of the community.

New legislation, adopted with all-party support, included the Declaration on the Rights of Indigenous Peoples Act (Bill 41) to implement the UNDRIP, the Protection of Public Participation Act (Bill 2) to address strategic lawsuits against public participation; the Ticket Sales Act (Bill 27) to ban the use of automated ticket-purchasing software, mandate secondary ticket sellers disclose the additional fees added to the original price, and provide refunds for cancelled events or unusable (e.g. counterfeit) tickets; the Zero-Emission Vehicles Act (Bill 28), to create a framework with targets for increasing the proportion of new zero-emission light-duty motor vehicles that are sold or leased in BC; and the Fuel Price Transparency Act (Bill 42), to require businesses involved in the transporting, marketing and supplying of gasoline and diesel to provide data to the BC Utilities Commission on how fuel prices are set.

Other significant legislative amendments included Bill 7, which amended the Business Practices and Consumer Protection Act to separately regulate "High-Cost Credit Products" and lower their maximum fees; Bill 4, which amended the Interpretation Act to allow for the ending of daylight saving time; and Bill 14, which created a duty to report discoveries of sites or objects with potential heritage value. Addressing employment and labour standards, Bill 8 raised the minimum work age from 12 to 14, prohibited employers from withholding or deducting tips from wages, and created a new allowance of unpaid leave for victims of domestic violence or critical illness, while Bill 30 removed teachers from the list of essential services and further addressed contract-flipping by extending protections to re-tendered service (janitorial, security, transportation, health) contracts. Both on a 44 to 38 vote, Bill 15 amended the administrative procedures of the Agricultural Land Commission and Bill 22 amended the Forest Act to require ministerial approval for companies to transfer a timber licence and to require public interest be considered in the disposition of forestry agreements. Based on the government's comprehensive review of BC Hydro, Bill 19 amended several acts to, among other things, reinstate the BC Utilities Commission's authority to review BC Hydro's electricity supply and demand forecasting (Integrated Resource Plan), disapply the Utilities Commission Act from Powerex, and require BC Utilities Commission approval of new purchase agreements with independent power producers and feed-in tariffs. Based on the coastal ferry services review, Bill 25 amended the Coastal Ferry Act to add that the BC Ferry Authority must consider the public's interest in safe, reliable and affordable service in addition to the other factors.

== Fifth session ==
The fifth session began on February 11, 2020, with a new speech from the throne. The legislature convened until March 5 before entering a recess which was interrupted by the impact of the COVID-19 pandemic in the province. It reconvened for one day, March 23, with 10 MLAs in attendance, when they adopted a $5-billion aid package and amendments to the Employment Standards Act to create an unpaid "COVID-19-related leave". The legislature re-convened in July and August. Additional COVID-19-related legislation included Bills 18 and 19 which postponed penalties for non-payment of several taxes, created a $1,000 supplement to the Canada Emergency Response Benefit, and allowed provincial budget deficits for the next 3 years. Legislative amendments arising from the 2020 budget (Bill 4) included the creation of a new top tax bracket that starts at $220,000, exempting electric aircraft from PST, three year extensions of the farmers' food donation tax credit and BC training tax credit, removing the PST exemptions that had applied to soda beverages and online streaming services, and making heated tobacco products subject to the Tobacco Tax Act.

Other legislation adopted included Bill 2 to, among other things, allow ICBC to require training courses as a pre-licensing requirement for certain classes of licenses; Bill 5 to amend the fourth session's creation of a 10-day unpaid leave regarding domestic violence to instead be 5 paid and 5 unpaid days for workers claiming to be experiencing domestic or sexual violence; Bill 8 to allow school boards to operate a before and after-school child care programs; Bill 9 as the government's response to Crowder v. British Columbia (Attorney General) regarding the role of expert witnesses in a vehicle injury lawsuits; and Bill 11 moving ICBC to moves a system of no-fault insurance. The fifth session ended on September 21, 2020, after Premier Horgan called a snap election for October 24, therefore dissolving the 41st Parliament. The Parliament was ended nearly one year ahead of the fixed date of October 16, 2021.

== Officeholders ==
=== Speaker ===
- Speaker of the Legislative Assembly of British Columbia:
  - Steve Thomson, Liberal (June 22–29, 2017)
  - Vacant (June 29 – September 8, 2017)
  - Darryl Plecas, Independent (September 8, 2017 – September 21, 2020)

=== Other chair occupants ===
- Deputy speaker: Raj Chouhan, NDP
- Assistant deputy speaker: Linda Reid, Liberal (2017 – February 12, 2019)
- Assistant deputy speaker Joan Isaacs, Liberal (2019 – February 11, 2020)
- Assistant deputy speaker Simon Gibson, Liberal
- Deputy chair, Committee of the Whole: Spencer Chandra Herbert, NDP

=== Leaders ===
- Premier of British Columbia:
  - Christy Clark, Liberal (June 22, 2017 – July 18, 2017)
  - John Horgan, NDP (July 18, 2017 – September 21, 2020)
- Leader of the Opposition:
  - John Horgan, NDP (June 22, 2017 – July 18, 2017)
  - Christy Clark, Liberal (July 18 – August 4, 2017)
  - Rich Coleman, Liberal (August 4, 2017 – February 3, 2018)
  - Andrew Wilkinson, Liberal (February 3, 2018 – September 21, 2020)
- Green Party leader:
  - Andrew Weaver (June 22, 2017 – January 6, 2020)
  - Adam Olsen (January 6, 2020 – September 14, 2020)
  - Sonia Furstenau (September 14, 2020 – September 21, 2020)

=== House leaders ===
- Government House Leader:
  - Mike de Jong, Liberal (June 22 – July 18, 2017)
  - Mike Farnworth, NDP (July 18, 2017 – September 21, 2020)
- Opposition House Leader:
  - Mike Farnworth, NDP (June 22 – July 18, 2017)
  - Mike de Jong, Liberal (July 18, 2017 – February 10, 2018)
  - Mary Polak, Liberal (February 10, 2018 – September 21, 2020)

== Members of the 41st Parliament ==
- The name in bold and italics, with "‡", is the premier
- The names in bold, with "†", are cabinet ministers
- The name in italics, with "††" is the leader of the Official Opposition
- The name with "*" is the speaker of the Assembly

Member	Party	Electoral district	First elected / previously elected	Term number
Darryl Plecas *	Liberal	Abbotsford South	2013	2
Darryl Plecas *	Independent	Abbotsford South	2013	2
**Mike de Jong** †	Liberal	Abbotsford West	1994	7
Simon Gibson	Liberal	Abbotsford-Mission	2013	2
Linda Larson	Liberal	Boundary-Similkameen	2013	2
Anne Kang	NDP	Burnaby-Deer Lake	2017	1
Raj Chouhan	NDP	Burnaby-Edmonds	2005	4
**Katrina Chen** †	NDP	Burnaby-Lougheed	2017	1
Janet Routledge	NDP	Burnaby North	2017	1
**Donna Barnett** †	Liberal	Cariboo-Chilcotin	2009	3
**Coralee Oakes** †	Liberal	Cariboo North	2013	2
John Martin	Liberal	Chilliwack	2013	2
Laurie Throness	Liberal	Chilliwack-Kent	2013	2
Doug Clovechok	Liberal	Columbia River-Revelstoke	2017	1
Joan Isaacs	Liberal	Coquitlam-Burke Mountain	2017	1
**Selina Robinson** †	NDP	Coquitlam-Maillardville	2013	2
Ronna-Rae Leonard	NDP	Courtenay-Comox	2017	1
Sonia Furstenau	Green	Cowichan Valley	2017	1
Ravi Kahlon	NDP	Delta North	2017	1
Ian Paton	Liberal	Delta South	2017	1
Mitzi Dean	NDP	Esquimalt-Metchosin	2017	1
Jackie Tegart	Liberal	Fraser-Nicola	2013	2
Peter Milobar	Liberal	Kamloops-North Thompson	2017	1
**Todd Stone** †	Liberal	Kamloops-South Thompson	2013	2
**Norm Letnick** †	Liberal	Kelowna-Lake Country	2009	3
Steve Thomson *	Liberal	Kelowna-Mission	2009	3
**Christy Clark** ‡ (to August 4, 2017)	Liberal	Kelowna West	1996, (Note: Port Moody-Burnaby Mountain) 2011, (Note: Vancouver-Point Grey) 2013	5*
Ben Stewart (from February 14, 2018)	Liberal (until August 1, 2019)	Kelowna West	2009, 2018	3*
Ben Stewart (from February 14, 2018)	Independent (until October 1, 2019)	Kelowna West	2009, 2018	3*
Ben Stewart (from February 14, 2018)	Liberal	Kelowna West	2009, 2018	3*
Tom Shypitka	Liberal	Kootenay East	2017	1
**Katrine Conroy** †	NDP	Kootenay West	2005	4
**John Horgan** ‡	NDP	Langford-Juan de Fuca	2005	4
**Mary Polak** †	Liberal	Langley	2005	4
**Rich Coleman** †	Liberal	Langley East	1996	6
Bob D'Eith	NDP	Maple Ridge-Mission	2017	1
**Lisa Beare** †	NDP	Maple Ridge-Pitt Meadows	2017	1
**Scott Fraser** †	NDP	Mid Island-Pacific Rim	2005	4
Leonard Krog (to November 30, 2018)	NDP	Nanaimo	1991, (Note: Parksville-Qualicum) 2005	6*
Sheila Malcolmson (from January 30, 2019)	NDP	Nanaimo	2019	1
Doug Routley	NDP	Nanaimo-North Cowichan	2005	4
**John Rustad** †	Liberal	Nechako Lakes	2005	4
**Michelle Mungall** †	NDP	Nelson-Creston	2009	3
**Judy Darcy** †	NDP	New Westminster	2013	2
Jennifer Rice	NDP	North Coast	2013	2
**Claire Trevena** †	NDP	North Island	2005	4
Bowinn Ma	NDP	North Vancouver-Lonsdale	2017	1
Jane Thornthwaite	Liberal	North Vancouver-Seymour	2009	3
Andrew Weaver	Green (until January 20, 2020)	Oak Bay-Gordon Head	2013	2
Andrew Weaver	Independent	Oak Bay-Gordon Head	2013	2
**Michelle Stilwell** †	Liberal	Parksville-Qualicum	2013	2
Dan Davies	Liberal	Peace River North	2017	1
**Mike Bernier** †	Liberal	Peace River South	2013	2
Dan Ashton	Liberal	Penticton	2013	2
**Mike Farnworth** †	NDP	Port Coquitlam	1991, 2005	6*
Rick Glumac	NDP	Port Moody-Coquitlam	2017	1
Nicholas Simons	NDP	Powell River-Sunshine Coast	2005	4
**Mike Morris** †	Liberal	Prince George-Mackenzie	2013	2
**Shirley Bond** †	Liberal	Prince George-Valemount	2001	5
**Teresa Wat** †	Liberal	Richmond North Centre	2013	2
**Linda Reid** †	Liberal	Richmond South Centre	1991	7
**Jas Johal** †	Liberal	Richmond-Queensborough	2017	1
John Yap	Liberal	Richmond-Steveston	2005	4
Adam Olsen	Green	Saanich North and the Islands	2017	1
**Lana Popham** †	NDP	Saanich South	2009	3
Greg Kyllo	Liberal	Shuswap	2013	2
**Ellis Ross** †	Liberal	Skeena	2017	1
**Doug Donaldson** †	NDP	Stikine	2009	3
Marvin Hunt	Liberal	Surrey-Cloverdale	2013	2
Jagrup Brar	NDP	Surrey-Fleetwood	2004, 2017	4*
Rachna Singh	NDP	Surrey-Green Timbers	2017	1
Garry Begg	NDP	Surrey-Guildford	2017	1
**Harry Bains** †	NDP	Surrey-Newton	2005	4
**Jinny Sims** †	NDP	Surrey-Panorama	2017	1
**Stephanie Cadieux** †	Liberal	Surrey South	2009	3
**Bruce Ralston** †	NDP	Surrey-Whalley	2005	4
Tracy Redies (to August 31, 2020)	Liberal	Surrey-White Rock	2017	1
**George Heyman** †	NDP	Vancouver-Fairview	2013	2
**Sam Sullivan** †	Liberal	Vancouver-False Creek	2013	2
**George Chow** †	NDP	Vancouver-Fraserview	2017	1
**Shane Simpson** †	NDP	Vancouver-Hastings	2005	4
Mable Elmore	NDP	Vancouver-Kensington	2009	3
**Adrian Dix** †	NDP	Vancouver-Kingsway	2005	4
Michael Lee	Liberal	Vancouver-Langara	2017	1
**Melanie Mark** †	NDP	Vancouver-Mount Pleasant	2016	2
**David Eby** †	NDP	Vancouver-Point Grey	2013	2
**Andrew Wilkinson** ††	Liberal	Vancouver-Quilchena	2013	2
Spencer Chandra Herbert	NDP	Vancouver-West End	2008	4
Eric Foster	Liberal	Vernon-Monashee	2009	3
**Carole James** †	NDP	Victoria-Beacon Hill	2005	4
**Rob Fleming** †	NDP	Victoria-Swan Lake	2005	4
Ralph Sultan	Liberal	West Vancouver-Capilano	2001	5
**Jordan Sturdy** †	Liberal	West Vancouver-Sea to Sky	2013	2

== Party standings of the 40th Parliament ==
=== Seating plan during Liberal Party government ===
												Chouhan		Kahlon	Begg	Brar					D'Eith
	Rice	Eby	Mungall	Chen	Bains	Elmore	Kang	Popham	Trevena	Donaldson		Krog	Heyman	Routley	Simons	Beare	Sims	Dean	Routledge	Singh	Glumac
		Darcy	Simpson	Robinson	Farnworth	HORGAN	James	Ralston	Dix	Mark	Fleming	Conroy	Herbert	Chow	Ma	Leonard	Fraser	WEAVER	Furstenau	Olsen
Thomson
		Cadieux	Stone	Polak	De Jong	CLARK	Coleman	Wilkinson	Reid	Bond	Bernier	Sullivan	Lee	Tegart	Yap	Redies	Sultan	Thornthwaite	Martin
	Stilwell	Oakes	Letnick	Wat	Johal	Sturdy	Rustad	Ross	Morris	Barnett		Clovechok	Isaacs	Hunt	Gibson	Ashton	Davies	Paton	Throness	Shypitka	Plecas
												Kyllo		Milobar	Larson	Foster

=== Seating plan during New Democratic Party government ===
												Reid		Wat	Larson	Foster
	Polak	Morris	Stilwell	Ashton	Oakes	Thomson	Sturdy	Ross	Isaacs	Milobar		Thornthwaite	Clovechok	Yap	Redies	Paton	Gibson	Sultan	Shypitka
		Cadieux	Rustad	Bond	De Jong	WILKINSON	Coleman	Kyllo	Stone	Bernier	Letnick	Johal	Lee	Hunt	Barnett	Tegart	Martin	Throness	Davies	Sullivan	Stewart
Plecas
		Darcy	Simpson	Robinson	Farnworth	HORGAN	James	Eby	Dix	Ralston	Mark	Fleming	Conroy	Fraser	Herbert	Rice	Malcomson	Furstenau	OLSEN	Glumac	Weaver
	Heyman	Donaldson	Mungall	Bains	Beare	Chen	Popham	Trevena	Sims	Chow		Kang	Simons	D'Eith	Routley	Elmore	Ma	Dean	Routledge	Singh
												Chouhan		Kahlon	Begg	Brar	Leonard

=== Standings changes ===
Standings changes in the 41st Parliament of British Columbia
Number of members per party by date	2017				2018		2019			2020	
Number of members per party by date	May 9	July 18	August 4	September 9	February 14	November 30	January 30	August 1	October 1	January 20	August 31
Liberal	43		42	41	42			41	42		41
New Democratic	41					40	41				
Green	3									2	
Independent	0			1				2	1	2	
Total members	87		86		87	86	87				86
Vacant	0		1		0	1	0				1
Government majority											
Government majority	–1	–3	–2		–3	–4	–3	–2	–3	–2	–3
Government with confidence-and-supply partners majority											
Government with confidence-and-supply partners majority	–1	1	2		1	0	1				

Membership changes in the 41st Parliament of British Columbia
Date	District	Member	Party before	Party after	Reason
August 4, 2017	Kelowna West	Christy Clark	Liberal	Vacant	Resigned her seat and as Liberal Party leader, following the defeat of her government and the swearing in of the NDP government.
September 9, 2017	Abbotsford South	Darryl Plecas	Liberal	Independent	Expelled from the Liberal caucus the day after being elected Speaker. He and the rest of the caucus had previously agreed not to serve as Speaker for a New Democratic Party government.
February 14, 2018	Kelowna West	Ben Stewart	Vacant	Liberal	Elected in by-election; Liberal hold.
November 30, 2018	Nanaimo	Leonard Krog	NDP	Vacant	Resigned seat after being elected mayor of Nanaimo.
January 30, 2019	Nanaimo	Sheila Malcolmson	Vacant	NDP	Elected in by-election; New Democratic Party hold.
August 1, 2019	Kelowna West	Ben Stewart	Liberal	Independent	Left caucus after Elections BC opened an investigation into whether he exceeded limits on donations in 2019.
October 1, 2019	Kelowna West	Ben Stewart	Independent	Liberal	Rejoined caucus after being cleared by Elections BC over donation limits.
January 20, 2020	Oak Bay-Gordon Head	Andrew Weaver	Green	Independent	Left caucus to attend to family health problems.
August 31, 2020	Surrey-White Rock	Tracy Redies	Liberal	Vacant	Resigned to become the next CEO of Science World.
