= 2013 Westside-Kelowna provincial by-election =

2013 provincial by-election in British Columbia

| ← 2013 | July 10, 2013 | 2017 → |

Riding of Westside-Kelowna
- Registered: 46,021
- Turnout: 18,797 (40.84%)
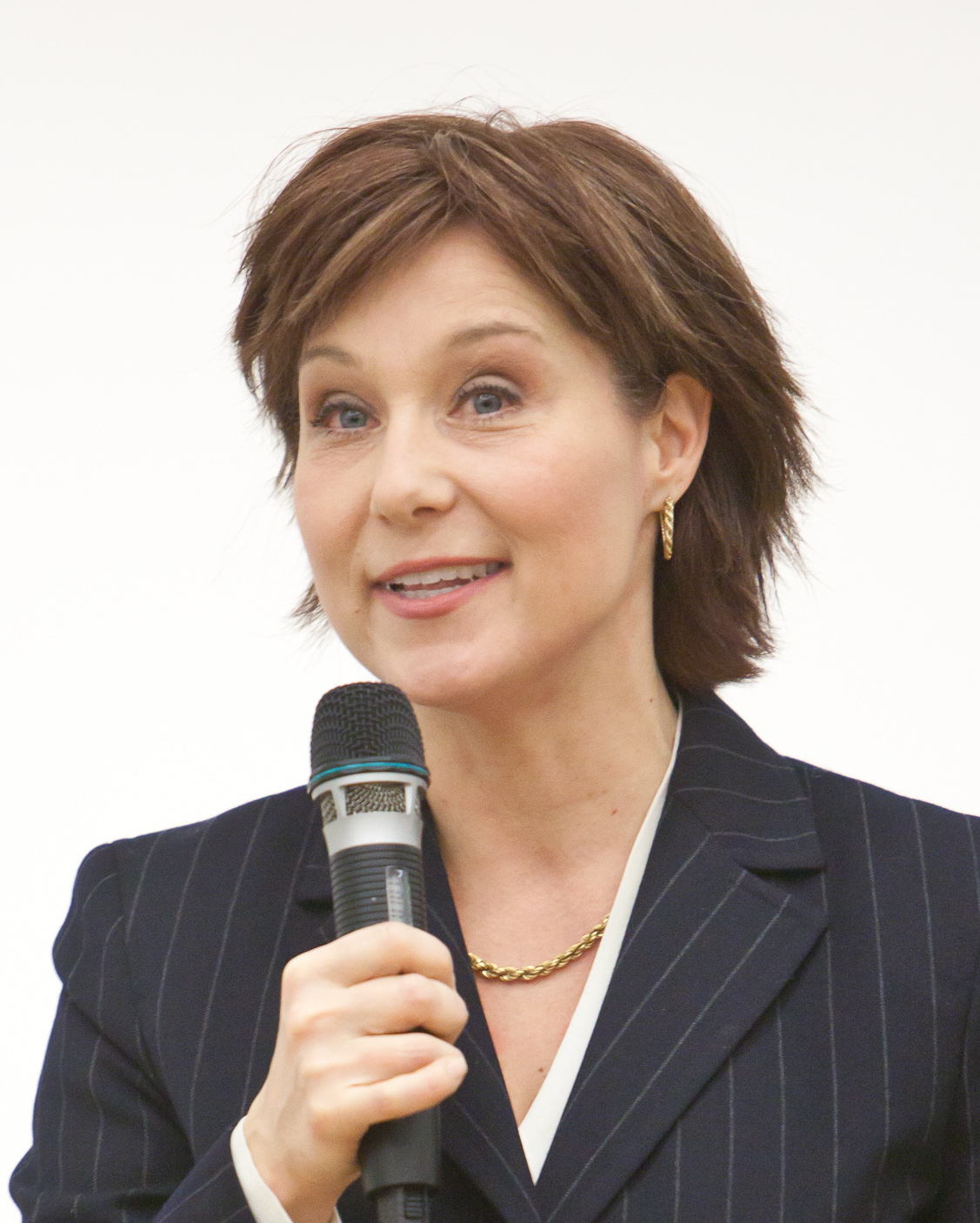
| | First party | Second party | Third party |
|---|---|---|---|
| | | NDP | CON |
| Candidate | Christy Clark | Carole Gordon | Sean Upshaw |
| Party | Liberal | New Democratic | Conservative |
| Popular vote | 11,758 | 5,563 | 1,115 |
| Percentage | 62.66% | 29.64% | 5.94% |
| Swing | ▲4.58 pp | ▼1.20 pp | ▼5.14 pp |
MLA before election
Ben Stewart
Liberal
Elected MLA
Christy Clark
Liberal

A by-election was held on July 13, 2013, to replace MLA Ben Stewart in the riding of Westside-Kelowna. Stewart resigned his seat to allow the Liberal Party leader and incumbent premier of British Columbia Christy Clark to run in a Liberal safe seat, following her electoral defeat in Vancouver-Point Grey during the 2013 British Columbia general election two months prior.

== Background ==
=== Vancouver-Point Grey election ===
In the 2013 British Columbia general election, Premier Christy Clark attempted to keep her seat in Vancouver-Point Grey. The constituency election was essentially a rematch of the 2011 by-election won by Clark against David Eby of the NDP. Unlike the by-election however, Eby defeated Clark, leaving the incumbent premier of British Columbia without a seat in the legislature. Despite her personal election loss, the Liberals led by Clark held their majority in the legislature, which by convention allowed Clark's government to remain in power. In order to remain in the legislature, Clark sought out Liberal MLAs in Liberal safe seats who were willing to resign their seat, so that Clark could contest it in a by-election. Eby would later go on to become premier after winning the NDP leadership election in 2022.

=== Westside-Kelowna election ===
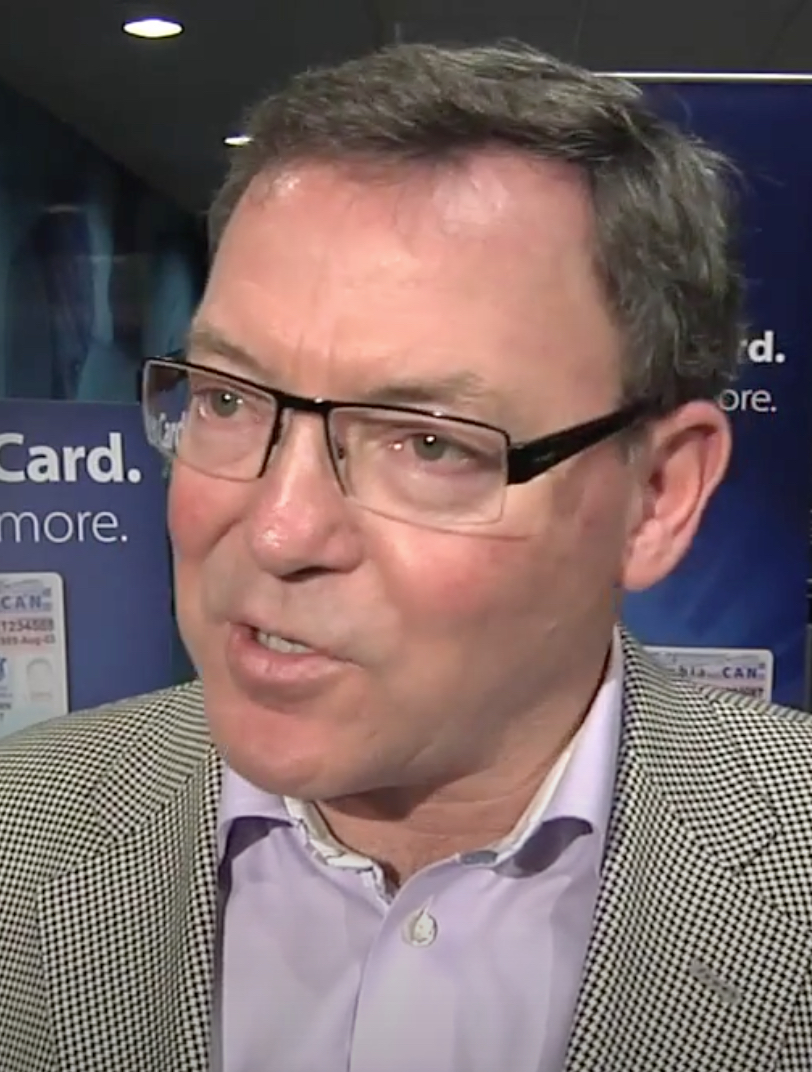
Ben Stewart, the resigning Westside-Kelowna MLA

On June 6, Liberal MLA Ben Stewart announced that he would be resigning his seat in Westside-Kelowna to give Christy Clark the opportunity to re-enter the legislature. Clark claimed that many other Liberal MLAs had also offered to give up their seats, but Kelowna stood out to her for its symbolic connection with free enterprise, as it was the home of premiers W.A.C. Bennett and Bill Bennett. The riding of Westside-Kelowna had also never been represented by a New Democratic MLA since its establishment.

== Candidates ==
- JB Bhandari (Vision)
- Christy Clark (Liberal; incumbent premier)
- John Marks (Independent)
- Carole Gordon (New Democratic)
- Silverado Brooks Socrates (Independent)
- Sean Upshaw (Conservative)
- Dayleen Van Ryswyk (Independent)
- Korry Zepik (Independent)

== Results ==
British Columbia provincial by-election, July 10, 2013: Westside-Kelowna Resignation of Ben Stewart
| Party | Candidate | Votes | % | ±% | Expenditures |
|---|---|---|---|---|---|
| Liberal | Christy Clark | 11,758 | 62.66 | +4.58 | $56,758 |
| New Democratic | Carole Gordon | 5,563 | 29.64 | −1.20 | $38,827 |
| Conservative | Sean Upshaw | 1,115 | 5.94 | −5.14 | $9,755 |
| Independent | Dayleen Van Ryswyk | 134 | 0.71 | – | $373 |
| Independent | John Marks | 74 | 0.39 | – | $250 |
| Independent | Silverado Brooks Socrates | 46 | 0.25 | – | $250 |
| Vision | JB Bhandari | 45 | 0.24 | – | $2,261 |
| Independent | Korry Zepik | 31 | 0.17 | – | $440 |
| Total valid votes | | 18,766 | 100.00 | – | |
| Total rejected ballots | | 31 | 0.16 | −0.80 | |
| Turnout | | 18,797 | 40.84 | −6.68 | |
| Registered voters | | 46,021 | | | |
| Liberal hold | | Swing | | +2.89 | |
Source: Elections BC

== Aftermath ==
After winning the by-election, Christy Clark remained the premier of British Columbia for the rest of the 40th parliamentary term. In October 2013, Ben Stewart was appointed by Christy Clark to be the BC Special Representative in Asia. In the 2017 election, Clark won again in Kelowna West (renamed from Westside-Kelowna), but her party lost their majority, resulting in a hung parliament. Despite her effort to keep the confidence of the legislature, her government was defeated fifty-one days after the general election, following the arrangement of a confidence and supply agreement between the New Democratic and Green parties. After losing the premiership, Christy Clark resigned her seat as an MLA, and another by-election was organized in Kelowna West, which was eventually won by Ben Stewart. Clark also resigned her position as leader of the BC Liberals and was replaced by Andrew Wilkinson in the subsequent leadership election.

== See also ==
- List of British Columbia by-elections
- 2011 British Columbia Liberal Party leadership election
- 2013 British Columbia general election
