= Barbara Copping =

Canadian politician (born 1944)

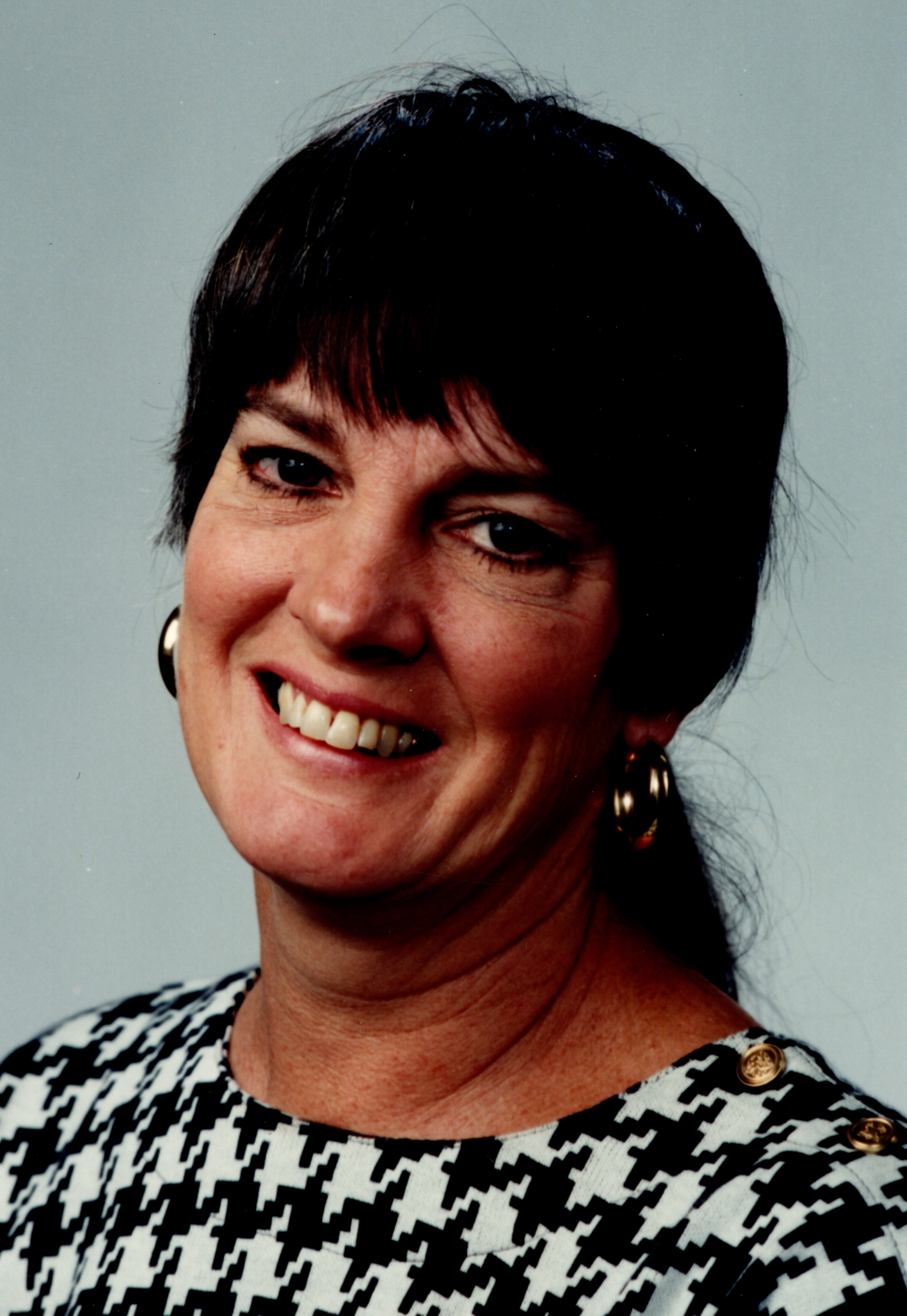

Member of the Legislative Assembly for Port Moody-Burnaby Mountain
- In office October 17, 1991 – May 28, 1996
- Preceded by: New riding
- Succeeded by: Christy Clark

Personal details
- Born: Barbara Fitzgerald; May 1, 1944 (age 82) Vancouver, British Columbia, Canada
- Party: New Democratic
- Spouse: Clayton Copping

Barbara Copping (née Fitzgerald; May 1, 1944) is a Canadian politician, who served as a New Democratic Member of the Legislative Assembly of British Columbia. She represented the riding of Port Moody-Burnaby Mountain from 1991 to 1996. She did not seek re-election in the 1996 provincial election nor in any subsequent provincial election.

== Electoral record ==
1991 British Columbia general election: Port Moody-Burnaby Mountain
Party	Candidate	Votes	%	±%
New Democratic	Barbara Copping	9,821	45.62	?
Liberal	Andrew Forrest	8,091	37.59	?
Social Credit	Edwin Billows	3,450	16.03	?
Green	Coleen Hennig	151	0.70	?
Communist	Robert Demorest	14	0.06	?
Total valid votes		21,527	—	
Rejected ballots		384	1.75	
Total ballots		21,911		
New Democratic notional hold		Swing		?
Elections BC
Note: New riding, no notional figures available to calculate change in percentage or swing.
