= Kelowna West =

Defunct provincial electoral district in British Columbia, Canada

British Columbia electoral district
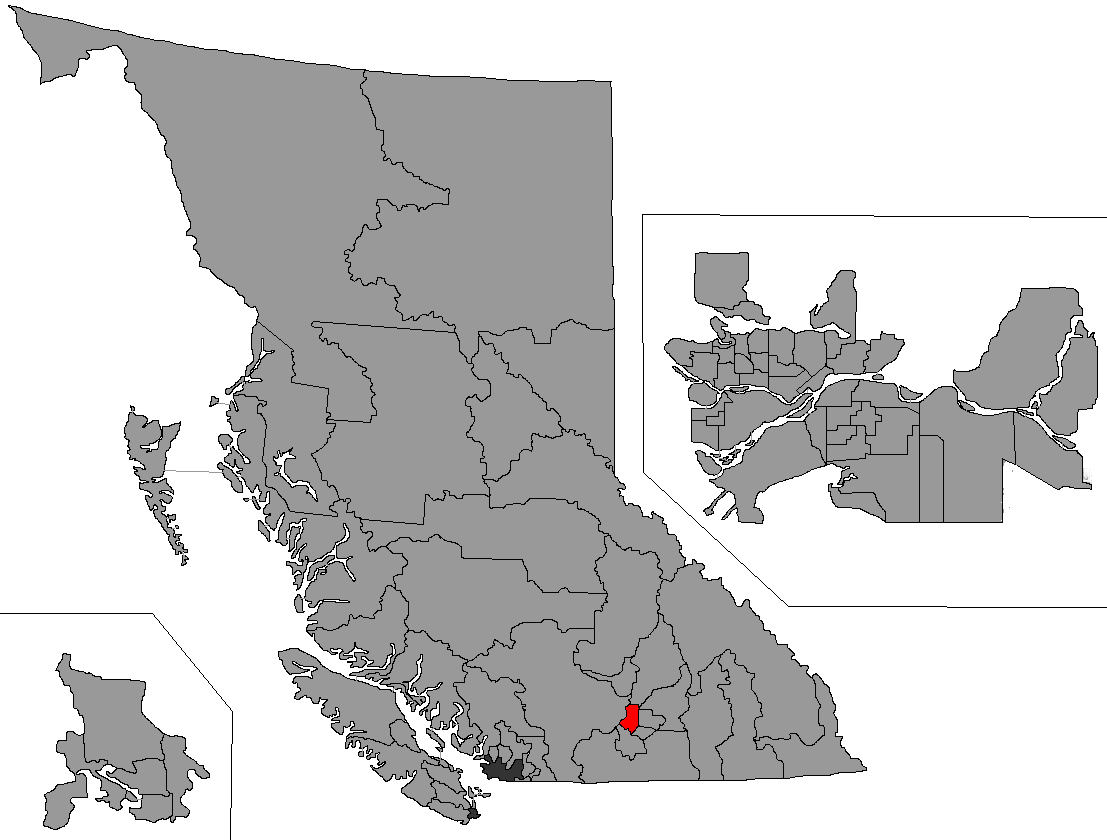

Defunct provincial electoral district
- Legislature: Legislative Assembly of British Columbia
- District created: 2008
- District abolished: 2021
- First contested: 2009
- Last contested: 2020

Demographics
- Population (2006): 51,958
- Electors (2013): 44,830
- Area (km²): 1,139.78
- Census division: Regional District of Central Okanagan
- Census subdivision(s): Central Okanagan J, Kelowna, Tsinstikeptum 9, Tsinstikeptum 10, West Kelowna

Kelowna West (name from 2017 to 2024) or Westside-Kelowna (name from 2009 to 2017) is a former provincial electoral district in British Columbia, Canada. It combined a portion of the city of Kelowna on the east shore of Lake Okanagan with communities on the west shore.

== History ==
The district was established as Westside-Kelowna by the Electoral Districts Act, 2008 and first contested in the 2009 general election. The riding was created out of parts of Okanagan-Westside, Kelowna-Lake Country, and Kelowna-Mission. It was renamed Kelowna West in the 2015 electoral redistribution with only minor boundary changes.

Just weeks after the 2013 British Columbia election, newly re-elected MLA Ben Stewart resigned to allow Premier Christy Clark, who had lost her own seat, to run in a by-election.

Clark resigned the seat and leadership of the BC Liberals effective August 4, 2017, after losing a confidence vote. A by-election for the seat was held on February 14, 2018.

Under the 2021 redistribution that took effect with the 2024 general election, the riding was divided, with portions on the west side of Okanagan Lake being redistributed to the new district of West Kelowna-Peachland and portions east of Okanagan Lake in the city of Kelowna transferring to the new district of Kelowna Centre.

== Geography ==
The riding contains the city of West Kelowna, all of the Regional District of Central Okanagan west of Lake Okanagan and north of Peachland, and the central part of the city of Kelowna.

== Members of the Legislative Assembly ==
Assembly	Years	Member	Party
Westside-Kelowna
39th	2009–2013	Ben Stewart	Liberal
40th	2013	Ben Stewart	Liberal
40th	2013–2017	Christy Clark	Liberal
Kelowna West
41st	2017	Christy Clark	Liberal
41st	2018 – August 2019	Ben Stewart	Liberal
41st	August–October 2019	Ben Stewart	Independent
41st	October 2019 – 2020	Ben Stewart	Liberal
42nd	November 2020–2023	Ben Stewart	Liberal
42nd	2023-October 2024	Ben Stewart	BC United

== Electoral history ==
=== Kelowna West ===
2020 British Columbia general election
Party	Candidate	Votes	%	±%	Expenditures
Liberal	Ben Stewart	12,991	49.89	−6.39	$25,167.49
New Democratic	Spring Hawes	8,854	34.00	+10.49	$3,285.58
Green	Peter Truch	3,274	12.57	−0.10	$3,191.00
Libertarian	Matt Badura	474	1.82	+1.01	$0.00
Independent	Magee Mitchell	446	1.71	–	$472.20
Total valid votes		26,039	100.00	–	
Total rejected ballots					
Turnout					
Registered voters					
Liberal hold		Swing		−8.44	
Source: Elections BC

British Columbia provincial by-election, February 14, 2018 Resignation of Christy Clark
Party	Candidate	Votes	%	±%	Expenditures
Liberal	Ben Stewart	8,406	56.28	−2.77	$87,790
New Democratic	Shelley Cook	3,511	23.51	−1.63	$49,337
Green	Robert Stupka	1,893	12.67	−1.00	$54,984
Conservative	Mark Thompson	1,006	6.73	–	$6,419
Libertarian	Kyle Michael Ernest Geronazzo	121	0.81	–	$250
Total valid votes		14,937	100.00	–	
Total rejected ballots		35	0.23	+0.07	
Turnout		14,972	31.55	−9.29	
Registered voters		47,461			
Liberal hold		Swing		−0.57	
Source: Elections BC

2017 British Columbia general election
Party	Candidate	Votes	%	±%	Expenditures
Liberal	Christy Clark	15,674	58.98	+0.98	$80,880
New Democratic	Shelley Cook	6,712	25.25	−5.71	$26,274
Green	Robert Mellalieu	3,628	13.65	–	$1,399
Independent	Brian Thiesen	570	2.14	–	$2,045
Total valid votes		26,584	100.0	–	
Total rejected ballots		128	0.48	+0.32	
Turnout		26,712	55.46	+14.62	
Registered voters		48,162			
Liberal hold		Swing		+3.34	
Source: Elections BC

=== Westside-Kelowna ===
British Columbia provincial by-election, July 10, 2013: Westside-Kelowna Resignation of Ben Stewart
Party	Candidate	Votes	%	±%	Expenditures
Liberal	Christy Clark	11,758	62.66	+4.58	$56,758
New Democratic	Carole Gordon	5,563	29.64	−1.20	$38,827
Conservative	Sean Upshaw	1,115	5.94	−5.14	$9,755
Independent	Dayleen Van Ryswyk	134	0.71	–	$373
Independent	John Marks	74	0.39	–	$250
Independent	Silverado Brooks Socrates	46	0.25	–	$250
Vision	JB Bhandari	45	0.24	–	$2,261
Independent	Korry Zepik	31	0.17	–	$440
Total valid votes		18,766	100.00	–	
Total rejected ballots		31	0.16	−0.80	
Turnout		18,797	40.84	−6.68	
Registered voters		46,021			
Liberal hold		Swing		+2.89	
Source: Elections BC

2013 British Columbia general election: Westside-Kelowna
Party	Candidate	Votes	%	±%	Expenditures
Liberal	Ben Stewart	12,405	58.07	+4.75	$74,230
New Democratic	Carole Gordon	6,588	30.84	+1.66	$37,807
Conservative	Brian Guillou	2,368	11.09	-1.94	$4,295
Total valid votes		21,361	100.00	–	
Total rejected ballots		209	0.97	+0.42	
Turnout		21,570	47.52	+0.15	
Registered voters		45,389			
Liberal hold		Swing		+1.55	
Source: Elections BC

2009 British Columbia general election: Westside-Kelowna
Party	Candidate	Votes	%	Expenditures
Liberal	Ben Stewart	10,334	53.33	$95,251
New Democratic	Tish Lakes	5,656	29.19	$26,122
Conservative	Peter Neville	1,772	9.14	$9,705
Green	Robin McKim	1,617	8.34	$1,075
Total valid votes		19,379	99.45	
Total rejected ballots		107	0.55	
Turnout		19,486	47.35	
Registered voters		41,155		

== See also ==
- List of British Columbia provincial electoral districts
- Canadian provincial electoral districts

Legislative Assembly of British Columbia
Preceded by Vancouver-Point Grey	Constituency represented by the premier of British Columbia; 2013–2017	Succeeded by Langford-Juan de Fuca
