= Water Sustainability Act 2014 =

Law in British Columbia, Canada

The Water Sustainability Act (WSA) is a British Columbia water management law that came into force on February 29, 2016.

The WSA allows the government of British Columbia to control groundwater and also surface water in the province. It also includes provisions for restricting water usage during shortages. The WSA also gives consumers certainty about their water rights, and it provides transparency in the rules pertaining to water.

Public consultation for the WSA began in 2009. Notable aspects include provisions for dam safety and a specific licensing requirement for groundwater takings. (Previously, only surface-water takings were regulated.)
