= Finn Creek Provincial Park =

Provincial park in British Columbia

- IUCN category II (national park)
- Location within British Columbia
- Interactive map of Finn Creek Provincial Park
- Location: Kamloops Division Yale Land District, British Columbia, Canada
- Nearest city: Blue River, BC
- Coordinates: 51°53′51″N 119°19′20″W
- Area: 384 ha (950 acres)
- Established: April 30, 1999
- Governing body: BC Parks

Finn Creek Provincial Park is a provincial park in British Columbia, Canada, north of Avola and Blue River in the valley of the North Thompson River.
