= Christy Clark =

Premier of British Columbia from 2011 to 2017

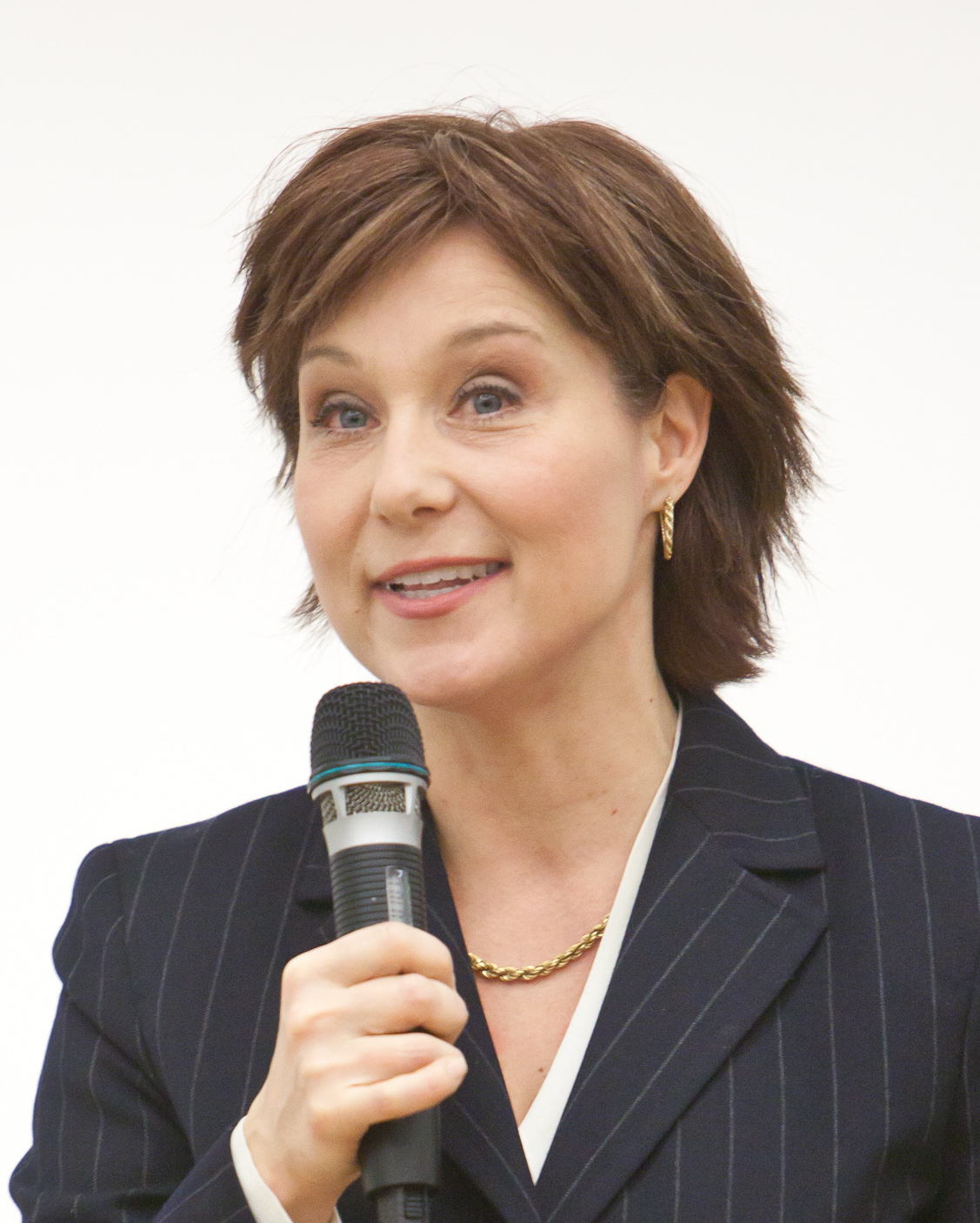
- Clark in 2011

35th Premier of British Columbia
- In office March 14, 2011 – July 18, 2017
- Monarch: Elizabeth II
- Lieutenant Governor: Steven Point; Judith Guichon
- Deputy: Kevin Falcon; Rich Coleman
- Preceded by: Gordon Campbell
- Succeeded by: John Horgan

Leader of the Opposition of British Columbia
- In office July 18, 2017 – August 4, 2017
- Preceded by: John Horgan
- Succeeded by: Rich Coleman

Leader of the Liberal Party of British Columbia
- In office February 26, 2011 – August 4, 2017
- Preceded by: Gordon Campbell
- Succeeded by: Rich Coleman (interim)
Other offices held
9th Deputy Premier of British Columbia
In office June 5, 2001 – September 20, 2004
Premier	Gordon Campbell
Preceded by	Joy MacPhail
Succeeded by	Shirley Bond
Minister of Education of British Columbia
In office June 5, 2001 – January 26, 2004
Premier	Gordon Campbell
Preceded by	Joy MacPhail
Succeeded by	Tom Christensen
Minister of Children and Family Development of British Columbia
In office January 26, 2004 – September 20, 2004
Premier	Gordon Campbell
Preceded by	Gordon Hogg
Succeeded by	Stan Hagen

Member of the Legislative Assembly of British Columbia
- In office July 10, 2013 – August 4, 2017
- Preceded by: Ben Stewart
- Succeeded by: Ben Stewart (2018)
- Constituency: Kelowna West (2017); Westside-Kelowna (2013–2017)
- In office May 30, 2011 – May 13, 2013
- Preceded by: Gordon Campbell
- Succeeded by: David Eby
- Constituency: Vancouver-Point Grey
- In office May 28, 1996 – May 17, 2005
- Preceded by: Barbara Copping
- Succeeded by: Iain Black
- Constituency: Port Moody-Westwood (2001–2005); Port Moody-Burnaby Mountain (1996–2001)

Personal details
- Born: Christina Joan Clark; October 29, 1965 (age 61) Burnaby, British Columbia, Canada
- Party: BC Liberal
- Other political affiliations: Conservative (federal) (2022–2023)
- Spouse: Mark Marissen (m. 1996; div. 2009)
- Children: 1
- Education: Simon Fraser University (no degree)
- Website: christyclark.com

Christina Joan Clark (born October 29, 1965) is a Canadian politician who served as the 35th premier of British Columbia from 2011 to 2017. She was the second woman to serve as premier of British Columbia.

A member of the Liberal Party of British Columbia, Clark served as a member of the Legislative Assembly (MLA) from 1996 to 2005 and was deputy premier from 2001 to 2005 during the first term of Gordon Campbell's government. She left politics in 2005, and became the host of an afternoon radio talk show. After Campbell's resignation, Clark won the 2011 leadership election, becoming premier. She re-entered the legislature after winning a by-election on May 11 in Vancouver-Point Grey, the seat left vacant by Campbell. The Liberals were re-elected in the 2013 provincial election in an upset victory. In the 2017 provincial election, the Liberals were reduced to 43 seats—one short of a majority. Following a confidence and supply agreement between the NDP and Green Party, Clark's minority government was defeated 44–42, and NDP leader John Horgan succeeded her as the premier on July 18. Clark subsequently announced that she was resigning as Liberal leader effective August 4 and leaving provincial politics.

Following Justin Trudeau's announcement that he would resign as prime minister and as leader of the federal Liberal Party, Clark was considered a potential candidate to succeed him. On January 14, 2025, she declined to enter the race, citing her lack of French fluency and the short timescale of the race.

== Early life and family ==
Clark was born on October 29, 1965, in Burnaby, British Columbia, the daughter of Mavis Audrey (née Bain) and Jim Clark. Her father was a teacher and a three-time candidate for the legislative assembly, and her mother, who was born in Glasgow, Scotland, was a marriage and family therapist in Vancouver. On June 8, 2016, Clark recounted that, as a 13-year-old girl on her way to work at her first job, she was forcibly grabbed and pulled into some bushes; she also shared that she had been subject to other sexual offences throughout her life and that she had not felt able to share this until a campus sexual assault bill proposed by the Green Party came up.

Clark graduated from Burnaby South Senior Secondary before attending Simon Fraser University (SFU), the Sorbonne in France and the University of Edinburgh in Scotland to major in political science and religious studies. She did not graduate from any post-secondary institution.

In 2001, Clark gave birth to her only child, Hamish Marissen-Clark, with then husband Mark Marissen. Clark was the second woman in Canadian history to give birth to a child while serving as a cabinet minister, after Pauline Marois, then a Quebec provincial minister, in 1985.

== Early political career ==
=== Political beginnings ===
Clark was active in student politics while at SFU, and in 1987 was elected president of the campus Young Liberals. In 1989, she was elected student president, but her election was voided after the opposition charged she broke campaign rules.

Clark served as a political staffer for the BC Liberal Party during its time in opposition, and in 1993, moved to Ottawa to serve as an aide to then-transport minister Doug Young. She returned to BC in 1996 after new leader Gordon Campbell invited her to run for office.

=== Opposition ===
Clark was first elected to the legislative assembly in the 1996 election, representing the riding of Port Moody-Burnaby Mountain. During the next five years, she served as the Official Opposition critic for the environment, children and families and for the public service. She also served as the campaign co-chair for the BC Liberals during the 2001 election, in which the party won 77 of 79 seats in the legislative assembly.

=== Government ===
Following the BC Liberal Party's election victory in 2001, Premier Gordon Campbell appointed Clark Minister of Education and Deputy Premier. She brought in a number of changes that were claimed to increase accountability, strengthen parental power in the decision-making process, and provide parents greater choice and flexibility in the school system. These changes were unpopular amongst teachers, school board members, opposition politicians, and union officials who argued that the decision not to fund the pay increases agreed to by the government resulted in funding gaps. The changes made were challenged by the BC Teacher's Federation, and were later found to be unconstitutional.

As Education Minister, Clark sought to increase the independence of the BC College of Teachers against heavy opposition from the British Columbia Teachers' Federation. In 2002, the BC Liberals and Education Minister Christy Clark introduced Bills 27 & 28 forcing teachers back to work and banning collective bargaining. In 2011, the BC Supreme Court found Minister Clark's decision to do so unconstitutional. Clark was deputy premier at the time of the privatization of BC Rail and resulting scandal. Clark was also the co-chair of the 2001 Liberal campaign, which included a platform that specifically promised not to sell BC Rail. In 2009, Michael Bolton, defence attorney in the Basi-Virk trial, alleged that Clark had participated in the scandal by providing government information to lobbyist Erik Bornmann. These allegations were never proven or tested in court. Dave Basi and Bob Virk, Liberal Party insiders were charged for accepting benefits from one of the bidders. Clark has rebuffed talk of her links to the scandal as "smear tactics". At the time of the raids and associated warrants, her then-husband Mark Marissen was visited at home by the RCMP. Her husband was also not under investigation, and was told that he might have been the "innocent recipient" of documents then in his possession.

In 2004, Clark was appointed Minister of Children and Family Development after Minister Gordon Hogg was forced to resign. On September 17, 2004, Clark quit provincial politics and did not seek re-election in the 2005 provincial election. She declared she wanted to spend more time with her three-year-old son.

=== Campaign for mayor of Vancouver ===
On August 31, 2005, Clark announced that she would seek the nomination of the Non-Partisan Association (NPA) to run for mayor in the Vancouver Civic Elections against local councillor Sam Sullivan. On September 24, 2005, she lost the NPA's mayoral nomination to Sullivan by 69 votes out of 2,100 cast. Sullivan was subsequently elected Mayor of Vancouver and in 2013 was elected a Liberal MLA while Clark was premier.

== Radio show and columnist ==
Clark hosted The Christy Clark Show, airing weekdays on CKNW 980 AM in Vancouver from August 27, 2007, until the time of her decision to enter the BC Liberal leadership election in December 2010. Clark also served as a weekly columnist for the Vancouver Province and the Vancouver Sun newspapers during the 2005 provincial election and an election analyst for Global BC and CTV News Channel during the 2006 federal election.

== Leadership campaign ==
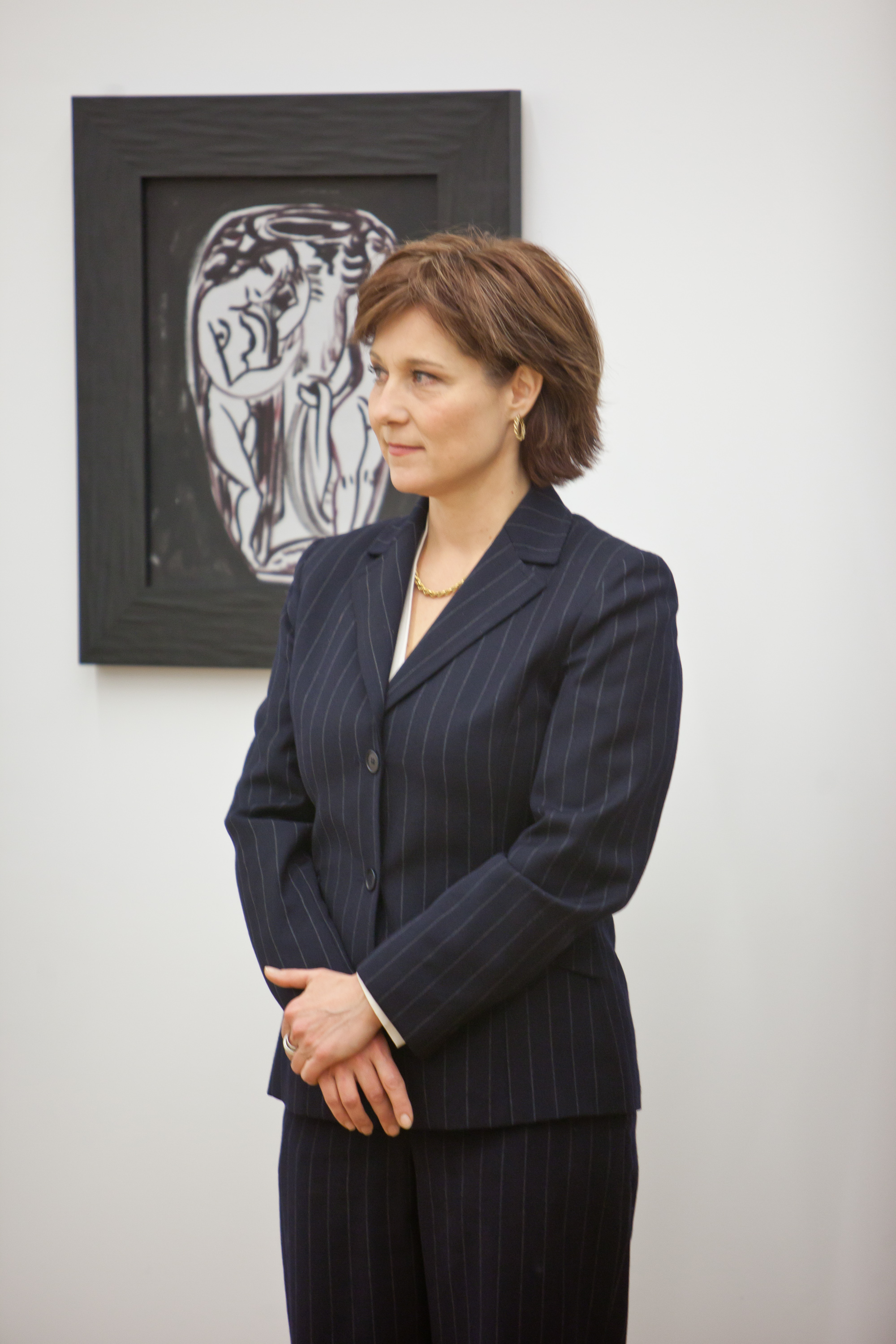
BC Liberal Party leadership candidate Christy Clark at a Vancouver arts and community centre

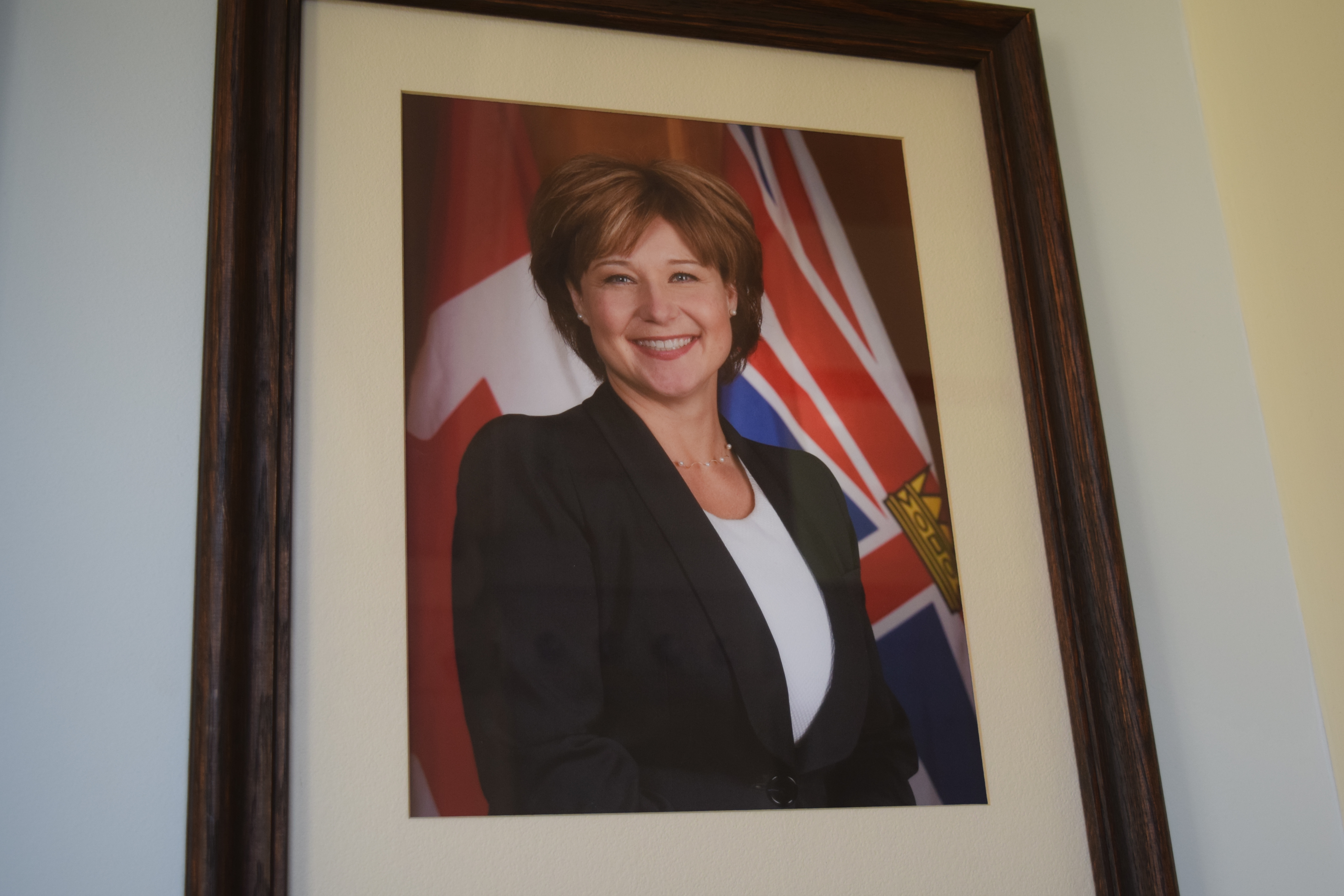
Clark's portrait at the British Columbia Legislative Buildings

On December 8, 2010, Clark officially announced her intent to seek the leadership of the BC Liberal Party. While Clark had long been touted as a potential successor to BC Premier Gordon Campbell, she often claimed she had no further interest in a political career. Public polling conducted prior to and after the announcement of her candidacy showed that Clark was the frontrunner to succeed Campbell as leader of the BC Liberals and premier. Clark launched her leadership bid saying she wanted a "family-first agenda". During the campaign she tried to cast herself as an outsider from the current caucus, and as the only candidate who could provide the change voters were looking for. Clark's policy proposals included observing a provincial Family Day in February, establishing an Office of the Municipal Auditor General to monitor local government taxation, and to provide a more open government by holding 12 town hall meetings a year to hear from residents. Regarding the controversial Harmonized Sales Tax (HST), she campaigned early on to cancel the referendum scheduled for September 2011. She suggested a free vote in the legislature by MLAs, believing the HST referendum has little chance of success. "Let our MLAs do their jobs and let our MLAs vote down the HST. Do it by March 31 and get it over with and get on with life in BC", Clark told a crowd of about 40 in Pitt Meadows. However, she eventually decided to continue with the planned referendum.

Despite her perceived frontrunner status, backbench MLA Harry Bloy was the only sitting member of BC Liberal caucus to endorse her candidacy for leader. The majority of the caucus supported the campaigns of Kevin Falcon and George Abbott, who were each endorsed by 19 MLAs. While some saw Clark as the best hope for the party there were fears that Clark's past background with the federal Liberal Party could fracture the party. The BC Liberals are not affiliated with any party at the federal level and is considered a "free-enterprise coalition" made up of both federal Conservatives and Liberals, and there were fears that right-wing supporters would move to the British Columbia Conservative Party which had started to make a comeback in the province after decades of dormancy.

Her campaign faced questions regarding her involvement in the sale of BC Rail due to her cabinet position and family connection to people "mentioned prominently in court documents, including search warrants", with opposition members stating that she "wants to shut down the public's questions about the scandal". It was in the wake of the controversial Basi-Virk guilty pleas that ended the trial proceedings that she declared her candidacy for the party leadership on her radio show. Clark had called for more questions to be answered about BC Rail, but since then has said that there is no need for a public inquiry, as have the other Liberal Party leadership contenders.

At the leadership convention held on February 26, 2011, Clark was elected leader of the BC Liberals on the third ballot, over former Health Minister Kevin Falcon. She won 52 per cent of the vote, compared to 48 per cent for Falcon.

== Premier of British Columbia (2011–2017) ==
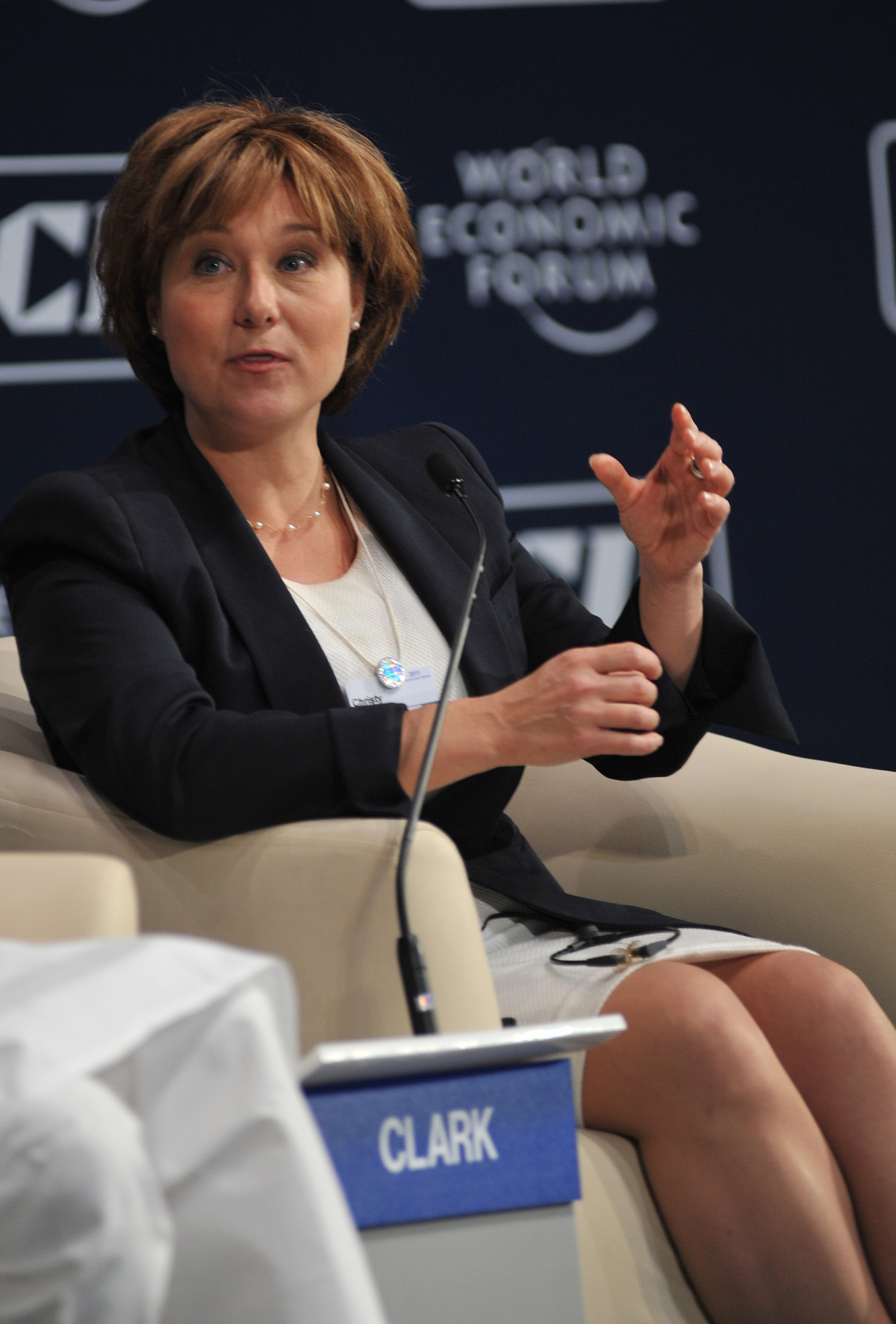
Premier Christy Clark at a 2011 World Economic Forum meeting in India

Clark was sworn in as premier of British Columbia on March 14, 2011, and unveiled a new smaller cabinet on the same day. At the time of her swearing in, she did not hold a seat in the legislature. Clark ran in former Premier Gordon Campbell's riding of Vancouver-Point Grey and defeated NDP candidate (and future Premier) David Eby by 595 votes. Her win marked the first time that a governing party won a by-election in 30 years.

After Clark became premier, the Liberal Party saw a bounce in support and lead in opinion polls, after falling behind the Official Opposition NDP under Campbell. However, the increase in support was short lived and within months the party had fallen behind the NDP once again. Several polls eventually showed a statistical tie between the Liberals and the minor Conservative Party, with support for each party in the low twenties, while support for the NDP was in the high 40s. Internal problems within the Conservative Party towards the end of 2012 saw the party bleed support to the Liberals.

In the summer of 2012, several high-profile caucus members, including the Ministers of Education and Finance, announced they wouldn't seek re-election. Though Premier Clark suggested she "expected" the resignations, the news shook her government. The Quick Wins ethnic outreach scandal, where the Liberals used government resources as part of their partisan ethnic outreach activities, generated public outcry.

During her premiership, she was accused of conflict of interest by MLA and former BC Liberal cabinet minister John van Dongen in relation to the sale of BC Rail during her service as a cabinet minister in the Campbell government. In April 2013, BC's Conflict of Interest Commissioner released a decision that Clark had been in neither a real nor apparent conflict of interest.

In June 2022 the Cullen Commission of Inquiry into Money Laundering in British Columbia final report stated: "In 2015... the premier learned that casinos conducted and managed by a Crown corporation and regulated by government were reporting transactions involving enormous quantities of cash as suspicious. Despite receiving this information, Ms. Clark failed to determine whether these funds were being accepted by the casinos (and in turn contributing to the revenue of the Province) and failed to ensure such funds were not accepted."

=== 2013 re-election ===
As the 2013 general election approached, polls showed that Clark was one of the least popular premiers in Canada. Two months prior to the election, The Province newspaper's front page featured a column by pundit Michael Smyth with the banner headline: "If This Man Kicked A Dog He Would Still Win The Election." However, Clark ran a "tightly-focused campaign that centred on jobs, LNG, and a 'debt free' BC" During the leaders' televised debate, Clark attacked NDP leader Adrian Dix for his "waffling position on the Kinder Morgan pipeline expansion". Dix's strategy of taking the "high road", similar to Jack Layton's successful approach in the 2011 federal election, left him vulnerable to "relentless [BC] Liberal attacks on the economic competence of his party".

Clark defied pollster predictions by leading her party to victory, its fourth consecutive mandate but her first, in the May 13, 2013, provincial election reversing a 20-point lead held by the BC NDP at the beginning of the campaign. However, she suffered personal defeat in Vancouver-Point Grey, losing her seat to NDP candidate David Eby by a margin of 785 votes. According to parliamentary precedent, she was entitled to remain premier, but had to win a by-election in order to sit in the Legislative Assembly. She did not rule out running in a riding outside the Lower Mainland in order to get back into the chamber, telling The Globe and Mail that she believed one reason she lost her own riding was that she was devoting so much time to serving the entire province.

On June 4, Clark announced she would run in a by-election for the safe Liberal seat of Westside-Kelowna to re-enter the Legislative Assembly. The incumbent MLA, government whip Ben Stewart, resigned in Clark's favour. Clark won the by-election on July 10, 2013, taking more than 60 per cent of the vote over NDP candidate Carole Gordon.

=== Economic policy ===
Under Clark the party charted a more centrist outlook while continuing its recent tradition of being a coalition of federal Liberal and federal Conservative supporters. She immediately raised the minimum wage from $8/hour to $10.25/hour and introduced a province-wide Family Day similar to Ontario's. Clark became premier during the aftermath of the 2008–09 recession, and continued to hold the line on government spending, introducing two deficit budgets before a balanced one for the 2013–14 fiscal year, which included a tax hike on high-income British Columbians.

=== Energy policy ===
Clark's government sought to take advantage of BC's liquified natural gas (LNG) reserves, positioning the budding LNG industry as a major economic development opportunity over the next decade. While the final years of Gordon Campbell's administration had seen far-reaching and progressive environmental legislation enacted, Clark was more measured in her approach to environmental policy. While continuing with BC's first-in-North-America carbon tax, she promised to freeze the rate during the 2013 election and her LNG development aspirations seemed to contradict greenhouse gas emissions targets set by the Campbell government in 2007. She also announced in 2012 that any future pipeline that crosses BC would have to meet five conditions that included environmental requirements and Aboriginal consultation. Controversially, she indicated that one of her five conditions would be that BC receives its "fair share" of any revenues that accrue from increased pipeline and tanker traffic. This has put her in direct conflict with the province of Alberta, who sought increased market access for its bitumen through BC ports, yet adamantly refuse any arrangement which would see BC receive any royalties.

=== Race relations ===
In May 2014, Clark gave a formal apology for 160 historical racist and discriminatory policies imposed against Chinese-Canadians:

While the governments which passed these laws and policies acted in a manner that [was] lawful at the time, today this racist discrimination is seen by British Columbians — represented by all members of the legislative assembly — as unacceptable and intolerable. The entire legislative assembly acknowledges the perseverance of Chinese Canadians that was demonstrated with grace and dignity throughout our history while being oppressed by unfair and discriminatory historical laws.

In October 2014 the British Columbia government exonerated First Nations leaders who had been sentenced to be hanged in the Chilcotin War by Judge Begbie in 1864. Clark stated, "We confirm without reservation that these six Tsilhqot'in chiefs are fully exonerated for any crime or wrongdoing."

=== 2017 election ===
On September 14, 2016, the BC Liberal Party named executive director Laura Miller as the party's campaign director for the 2017 provincial election. At the time, Miller was facing charges in Ontario for allegedly deleting emails while in service with the Dalton McGuinty provincial Liberal government, though she was later found not guilty.

The BC Liberals planned a bridge to replace the Massey Tunnel. The Liberal government instituted taxes for Metro Vancouver property purchases by foreign buyers ("Foreign Buyers Tax"), and implemented a program of no-interest loans from the government to first-time home buyers.

Clark campaigned on her government's economic track record. However, the opposition NDP and Greens criticized her inaction on "lax political fundraising laws" and portrayed her as "beholden to big money interests", attacking the BC Liberals on "housing, transit and other affordability issues". While BC enjoyed strong economic growth and her government had five balanced budgets, BC was also "becoming behind the country’s most unequal province, socio-economically speaking, thanks to 37 per cent cuts to income tax levies, tightened rules for welfare eligibility, cuts to child-care subsidies, reductions in support for women’s centres and the doubling of post-secondary tuitions". Clark also faced "relentless criticism over bottomless corporate and foreign donations that gave her party a four-fold advantage over the NDP, such that even The New York Times labelled BC the "wild west" of political cash and the province's elections agency referred its investigation to the RCMP". During her leadership of the BC Liberals, she had shifted them "so far to the right [with regards to environmental and energy policies] to appease its ascendant federal Conservative flank it is now unrecognizable from the centrist party led by Gordon Campbell, her predecessor". The combination of these controversies caused Liberal support in Metro Vancouver to collapse, as an estimated 100,000 voters switched from the Liberals to the Greens.

Furthermore, a video of Clark having a run-in with a disgruntled voter inside a North Vancouver grocery store went viral with the hashtag #IamLinda.

In the 2017 general election, the BC Liberals held the largest number of seats (43), ahead of the NDP (41) and Greens (3), but they were one seat short of forming a majority in the Legislative Assembly.

=== Return to the opposition and retirement ===
After the election the Liberals entered negotiations with the Green Party of British Columbia, which held the balance of power in the legislative assembly; however, on May 29, 2017, the Greens instead reached a confidence and supply agreement with the official opposition NDP, which on paper allowed the NDP to form a minority government by one seat. Although NDP leader John Horgan and Green Party leader Andrew Weaver did not have a close personal relationship, Weaver picked the NDP over the Liberals, citing Clark's dismantling of the province's climate change plan (that Weaver worked with then-Premier Gordon Campbell to develop prior to entering politics) plus support for energy companies and pipelines. Furthermore, Horgan reached out to Weaver personally while Clark did not.

Nonetheless, the Liberal government did not relinquish power yet, and Clark's new cabinet was sworn in on June 8. Clark subsequently recalled the legislative assembly to test its confidence in her government, with a speech from the throne that included billions of dollars in new funding and key policies supported by the NDP and Greens. Critics saw the throne speech as a cynical way for the Clark government to "desperately cling to power in selling out her party and its supporters in offering a de facto 'renewed' policy platform that stands in stark contrast to the last several years of the BC Liberal government and the still-warm corpse of the party’s election platform". One critic saw Clark's gambit as unprincipled "because it’s disrespectful to voters who rely on parties as aggregators of ideas that lead to policies they like", noted that the 30 pledges were absent from the Liberals' election platform, but also the "dramatic conversion to an NDP/Green-light version of her party appear like an over-correction, given the modest shift in support" as the Liberals lost 4 percentage points of popular vote in the general election. However, both the NDP and Green Party leaders said they would not consider legislation by the Liberal minority government, and none of their MLAs broke ranks to support the throne speech.

On June 29, Clark's minority government was defeated 44–42 after Horgan introduced a no-confidence motion as an amendment to the throne speech. Clark then asked Lieutenant Governor Judith Guichon for a new election, contending that the NDP could not provide stable government due to the need for one of the NDP's members to become speaker. Clark argued that an NDP speaker would frequently be forced to use their casting vote to break 43–43 ties. Guichon did not agree and refused to dissolve the legislature. Clark then resigned as premier, and Guichon invited Horgan to form a minority government, which took office on July 18.

On July 28, Clark announced that she would resign as Liberal Party Leader and exit from politics, effective August 4, 2017.

== Post-premiership ==
Clark considered running in the 2020 Conservative Party of Canada leadership election, but ultimately decided against it. She endorsed Jean Charest in the 2022 Conservative Party of Canada leadership election. Clark took out a membership in the party and received a ballot to vote in the race, her membership expired on June 23, 2023.

She was on the advisory council of Centre Ice Canadians in 2023. She left the group before it became the Canadian Future Party, stating she believed the group would have been better served focusing on supporting centrist candidates within existing parties.

On June 27, 2024, she called on Justin Trudeau to resign as Prime Minister after the Conservative upset byelection win against the Liberals in Toronto—St. Paul's. In September 2024, Clark gave a speech at the Ontario Liberal Party's annual general meeting about running a winning campaign. In October 2024, she confirmed that she was interested in running for the leadership should Justin Trudeau resign.

Following Trudeau's resignation announcement on January 6, 2025, Clark was considered as a possible candidate in the 2025 Liberal Party of Canada leadership election. She had been reportedly learning French prior to his resignation. On January 10, during an interview with CBC Radio's The House, she announced that she was seriously considering running. She falsely claimed that she never took out a Conservative membership when she supported Charest against Pierre Poilievre in the 2022 Conservative Party leadership election despite multiple past statements saying she had done so and voted for him. Clark challenged the Conservative Party of Canada to publish her membership record, which it did shortly after the interview. She then apologized for misspeaking. On January 14, 2025, she declined to enter the race, citing her lack of French fluency and the short timescale of the race.

After Mark Carney became prime minister, his team made efforts to recruit Clark as a star candidate for the 2025 federal election. On March 24, 2025, Clark announced that she would not be running in the election. Clark is a political commentator on CTV News Channel. She launched a podcast in 2026, and endorsed the Conservative Party of British Columbia in the 2026 British Columbia general election.

== Electoral record ==
1996 British Columbia general election: Port Moody-Burnaby Mountain
Party	Candidate	Votes	%	±%
Liberal	Christy Clark	10,272	44.73	+7.14
New Democratic	Jamie Ross	9,804	42.69	–2.93
Progressive Democrat	Margaret Connor	1,408	6.13	—
Reform	Diane Friesen	1,039	4.52	—
Green	Oz Catt	441	1.93	+1.23
Total valid votes		22,964	—	
Rejected ballots		194	0.88	
Total ballots		23,158		
Liberal gain from New Democratic		Swing		+5.04
Elections BC

2001 British Columbia general election: Port Moody-Westwood
Party	Candidate	Votes	%	Expenditures
Liberal	Christy Clark	16,500	74.64	$80,260
New Democratic	Brian Revel	4,178	18.90	$9,282
Marijuana	Graeme Smecher	1,428	6.46	$393
Total valid votes		22,106	–	
Total rejected ballots		193	0.87	
Turnout		22,299	71.80	
Source: Elections BC

British Columbia provincial by-election, May 11, 2011: Vancouver-Point Grey Resignation of Gordon Campbell
Party	Candidate	Votes	%	±%	Expenditures
Liberal	Christy Clark	7,757	48.73	-1.65	$98,448
New Democratic	David Eby	7,193	45.19	+4.91	$77,889
Green	Françoise Raunet	545	3.42	-5.36	$309
First	Danielle Alie	379	2.38	–	$35,785
Independent	William Gibbens	28	0.18	–	$388
Independent	Eddie Petrossian	16	0.10	–	$321
Total valid votes		15,918	100	–	
Total rejected ballots		33	0.21	–	
Turnout		15,951	38.94	-17.04	
Liberal hold		Swing		-3.28	

2013 British Columbia general election: Vancouver-Point Grey
Party	Candidate	Votes	%	±%
New Democratic	David Eby	11,499	47.59	+2.40
Liberal	Christy Clark	10,436	43.19	-5.54
Green	Françoise Raunet	1,636	6.77	+3.35
Conservative	Duane Nickull	392	1.62	–
Independent	William Gibbens	72	0.30	+0.12
Libertarian	Marisa Palmer	66	0.27	–
Work Less	Hollis Jacob Linschoten	51	0.21	–
Platinum	Bernard Bedu Yankson	11	0.05	–
Total valid votes		24,163	100.00	–
Total rejected ballots		69	0.28	–
Turnout		24,232	58.97	+20.03
New Democratic gain from Liberal		Swing		+3.97
Source: Elections BC

British Columbia provincial by-election, July 10, 2013: Westside-Kelowna Resignation of Ben Stewart
Party	Candidate	Votes	%	±%	Expenditures
Liberal	Christy Clark	11,758	62.66	+4.58	$56,758
New Democratic	Carole Gordon	5,563	29.64	−1.20	$38,827
Conservative	Sean Upshaw	1,115	5.94	−5.14	$9,755
Independent	Dayleen Van Ryswyk	134	0.71	–	$373
Independent	John Marks	74	0.39	–	$250
Independent	Silverado Brooks Socrates	46	0.25	–	$250
Vision	JB Bhandari	45	0.24	–	$2,261
Independent	Korry Zepik	31	0.17	–	$440
Total valid votes		18,766	100.00	–	
Total rejected ballots		31	0.16	−0.80	
Turnout		18,797	40.84	−6.68	
Registered voters		46,021			
Liberal hold		Swing		+2.89	
Source: Elections BC

2017 British Columbia general election: Kelowna West
Party	Candidate	Votes	%	±%	Expenditures
Liberal	Christy Clark	15,674	58.98	+0.98	$80,880
New Democratic	Shelley Cook	6,712	25.25	−5.71	$26,274
Green	Robert Mellalieu	3,628	13.65	–	$1,399
Independent	Brian Thiesen	570	2.14	–	$2,045
Total valid votes		26,584	100.0	–	
Total rejected ballots		128	0.48	+0.32	
Turnout		26,712	55.46	+14.62	
Registered voters		48,162			
Liberal hold		Swing		+3.34	
Source: Elections BC

Order of precedence
Preceded by Gordon Campbell as 34th Premier of British Columbia	Order of precedence in British Columbia as of 2026	Succeeded by David Eby as 37th Premier of British Columbia
