= Judith Guichon =

Lieutenant Governor of British Columbia from 2012 to 2018

The Honourable Judith Guichon OBC
- Guichon in 2016

29th Lieutenant Governor of British Columbia
- In office November 2, 2012 – April 24, 2018
- Monarch: Elizabeth II
- Governors General: David Johnston; Julie Payette
- Premier: Christy Clark; John Horgan
- Preceded by: Steven Point
- Succeeded by: Janet Austin

Personal details
- Born: 1947 (age 78–79) Montreal, Quebec, Canada
- Spouses: Lawrence Guichon (died 1999); Bruno Joseph Jacques Mailloux (m. 2006)
- Profession: Rancher

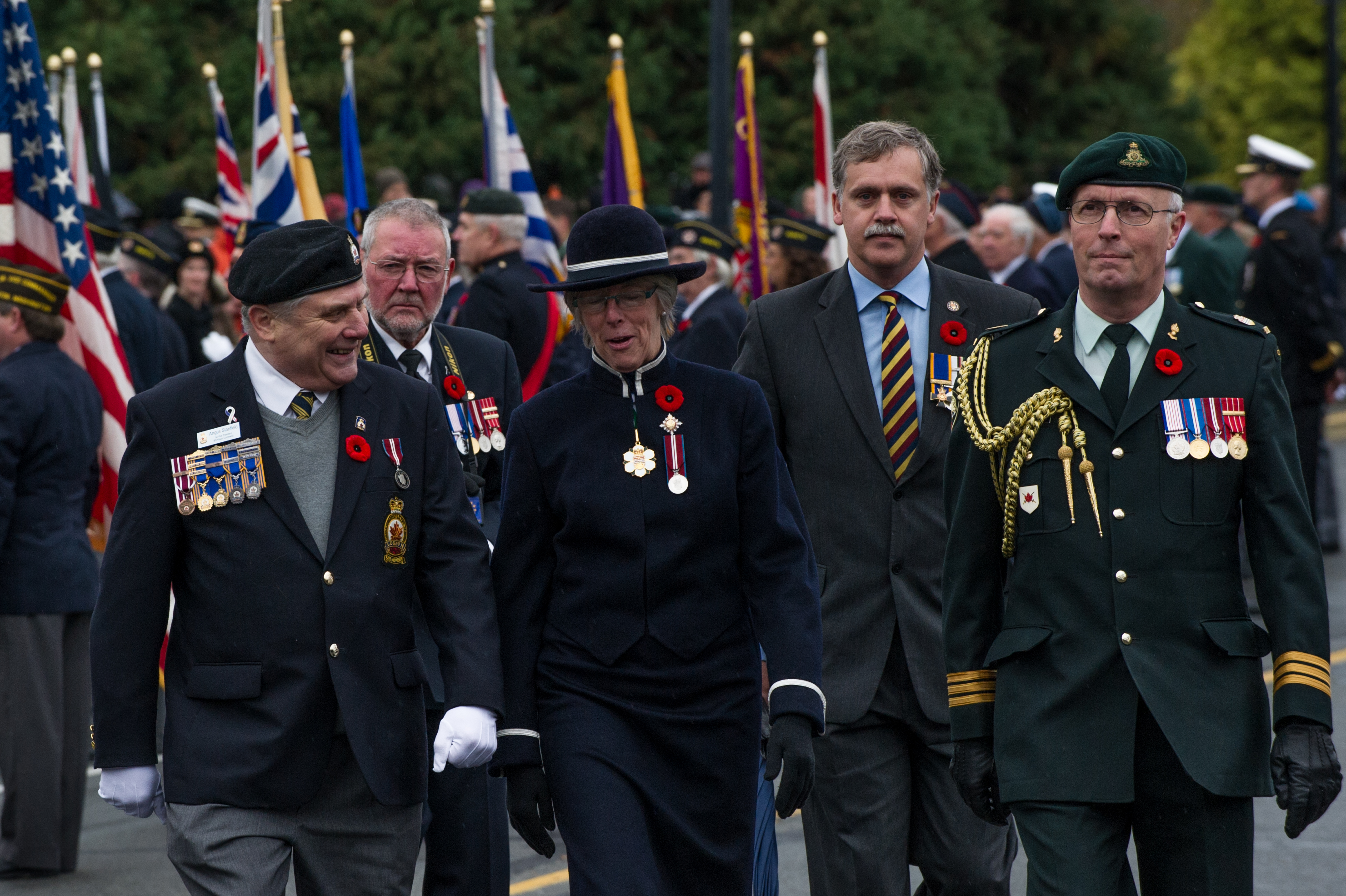
Guichon (centre) during Remembrance Day celebrations in 2012

Judith Isabel Guichon, OBC (born 1947) is a Canadian rancher and organizer who served as the 29th Lieutenant Governor of British Columbia, serving from 2012 to 2018. She was the viceregal representative of Queen Elizabeth II in the province of British Columbia, and was appointed by Governor General David Johnston on the advice of then-Prime Minister Stephen Harper.

== Personal life ==
Guichon was born in Montreal, Quebec, in 1947, and raised on a farm near Hawkesbury, Ontario. She moved to British Columbia in 1972. Her first husband, Lawrence Guichon, was killed in a motorcycle accident near the family ranch in 1999. She and her current husband, Bruno Mailloux, maintain their private residence in the Nicola Valley.

== Ranching career ==
Prior to Guichon's appointment as Lieutenant Governor, she owned and operated Gerard Guichon Ranch Limited in the Nicola Valley in the British Columbia Interior. The Guichon family has ranched in the area since 1878, and Guichon's father-in-law was inducted into the Order of Canada in 1974 for his leadership in Cattleman's Associations and his contribution to agriculture in Canada. As of 2012, her four children managed the ranch with a 700-head cow, calf, and 700-yearling operation. Guichon studied holistic management, a farming method which claims sustainable management of livestock by emphasizing their natural habitat. Along with her late husband, commercial pilot Lawrence Guichon, she was involved in introducing holistic management to the ranchers of British Columbia.

In addition to her ranching initiatives, Guichon is also involved in several organizations. She previously was on the local hospital board and Community Health Council, and as of 2012 was on the Community Health Foundation Board. Prior to this, she was a 4-H Leader and started a recycling society in Merritt with a neighbour. She was also a director for the Fraser Basin Council of BC, a director of the Grasslands Conservation Council of BC, a member of the Nicola Water Use Management planning committee, and played the flute in the Nicola Valley Community Band. Prior to her appointment as Lieutenant Governor, Guichon served on the Provincial Task Force on Species at Risk and completed a two-year term as the president of the British Columbia Cattlemen’s Association. She was also a part of the Ranching Task Force for BC and the British Columbia Agri-Food Trade Advisory Council.

== Lieutenant governor ==
Guichon was appointed lieutenant governor by Governor General of Canada David Johnston, on the advice of Prime Minister of Canada Stephen Harper on October 1, 2012, to succeed Steven Point. Guichon was sworn in on November 2, 2012, at the British Columbia Parliament Buildings.

Guichon played a central role in the aftermath of the 2017 provincial election, which resulted in neither the incumbent Liberals nor opposition New Democrats winning a majority. The balance of power rested with the Greens, who held three seats. Three weeks after the election, the Greens agreed to support an NDP minority government, which theoretically allowed NDP leader John Horgan to form government by one seat. However, incumbent premier Christy Clark refused to stand down until she got a chance to show that she had support on the floor of the legislature. Horgan introduced a no-confidence motion as an amendment to the Speech from the Throne, which passed on June 29, bringing Clark's government down. Clark advised Guichon to call new elections. She contended that the NDP would not be able to provide stable government due to the need to place one of its members in the Speaker's chair, resulting in a large number of 43–43 votes that would require the Speaker to use his casting vote. However, Guichon did not agree and refused to dissolve the legislature. Clark then resigned as premier, and Guichon invited Horgan to form a government, which was duly sworn in on July 18.

== Honours ==
- Order of British Columbia, 2012 (also Chancellor of the Order during her term as Lieutenant Governor)
- Knight of The Most Venerable Order of the Hospital of St. John of Jerusalem
- Queen Elizabeth II Diamond Jubilee Medal, 2012

Coat of arms of Judith Guichon
Crest A sharp-tailed grouse dancing proper; Escutcheon Vert a base enarched Or overall a bluebunch wheatgrass plant eradicated counterchanged; Supporters Dexter a horse proper charged on its shoulder with a Guichon quarter circle and bar horse brand Sable, sinister a steer proper charged on its hip with the cattle brand JG Sable, both collared Or and standing on a grassy mount with a burrowing owl issuant from a burrow on the sinister proper; Motto Relationships, Respect, Responsibility

Order of precedence
Preceded by Steven Point as 28th Lieutenant Governor of British Columbia	Order of precedence in British Columbia as of 2018	Succeeded by Bill Vander Zalm as 28th Premier of British Columbia
