= Port Moody-Burnaby Mountain =

Defunct provincial electoral district in British Columbia, Canada

British Columbia electoral district

Defunct provincial electoral district
- Legislature: Legislative Assembly of British Columbia
- District created: 1990
- District abolished: 2001
- First contested: 1991
- Last contested: 1996

Demographics
- Census division: Metro Vancouver
- Census subdivision(s): Burnaby, Port Moody

Port Moody-Burnaby Mountain was a provincial electoral district for the Legislative Assembly of British Columbia from 1991 to 2001.

== Members of the Legislative Assembly ==
Port Moody-Burnaby Mountain
Assembly	Years	Member	Party
Riding created from Coquitlam-Moody and Burnaby North
35th	1991–1996	Barbara Copping	New Democratic
36th	1996–2001	Christy Clark	Liberal
Riding dissolved into Burquitlam, Port Coquitlam-Burke Mountain, and Port Moody-Westwood

== Elections ==
1996 British Columbia general election
Party	Candidate	Votes	%	±%
Liberal	Christy Clark	10,272	44.73	+7.14
New Democratic	Jamie Ross	9,804	42.69	–2.93
Progressive Democrat	Margaret Connor	1,408	6.13	—
Reform	Diane Friesen	1,039	4.52	—
Green	Oz Catt	441	1.93	+1.23
Total valid votes		22,964	—	
Rejected ballots		194	0.88	
Total ballots		23,158		
Liberal gain from New Democratic		Swing		+5.04
Elections BC

1991 British Columbia general election
Party	Candidate	Votes	%	±%
New Democratic	Barbara Copping	9,821	45.62	?
Liberal	Andrew Forrest	8,091	37.59	?
Social Credit	Edwin Billows	3,450	16.03	?
Green	Coleen Hennig	151	0.70	?
Communist	Robert Demorest	14	0.06	?
Total valid votes		21,527	—	
Rejected ballots		384	1.75	
Total ballots		21,911		
New Democratic notional hold		Swing		?
Elections BC
Note: New riding, no notional figures available to calculate change in percentage or swing.
