= Ben Stewart =

Canadian politician

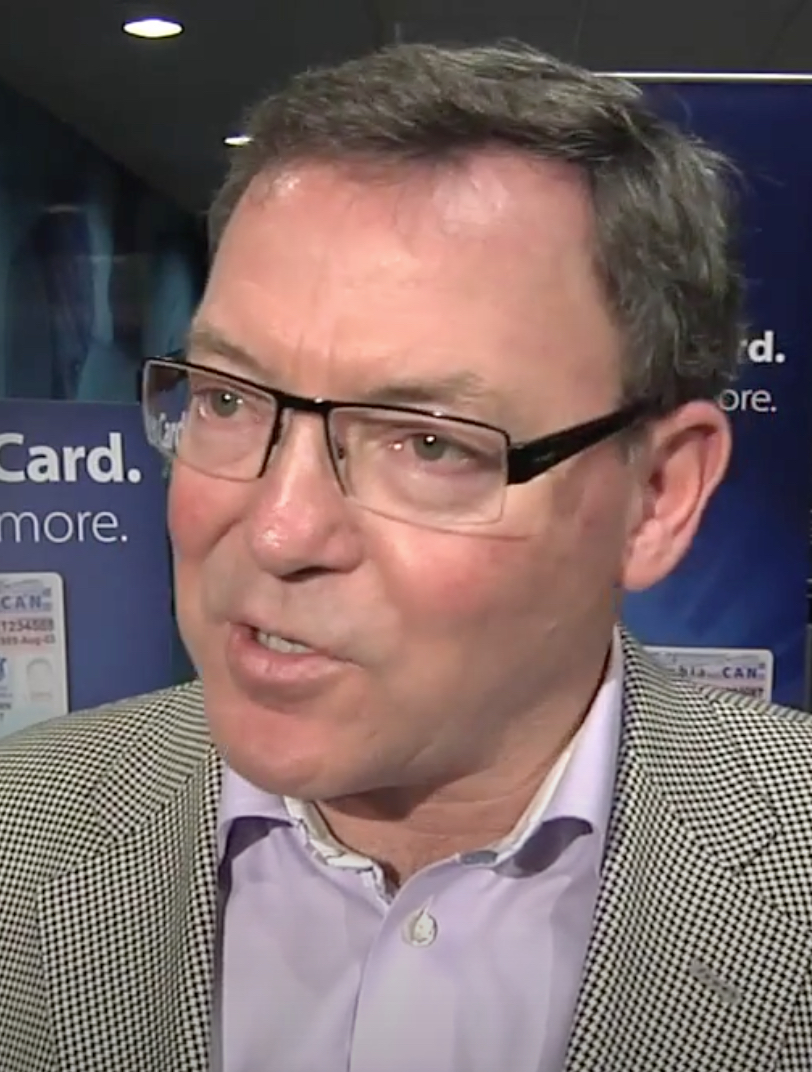
- Stewart in 2013

Member of the British Columbia Legislative Assembly for Kelowna West Westside-Kelowna (2009–2013)
- In office February 14, 2018 – September 21, 2024
- Preceded by: Christy Clark
- Succeeded by: Constituency abolished
- In office May 12, 2009 – June 5, 2013
- Preceded by: Constituency established
- Succeeded by: Christy Clark

Minister of Citizens' Services and Open Government of British Columbia
- In office September 5, 2012 – April 2013
- Premier: Christy Clark
- Preceded by: Margaret MacDiarmid
- Succeeded by: Andrew Wilkinson

Minister of Agriculture of British Columbia
- In office October 25, 2010 – March 14, 2011
- Premier: Gordon Campbell
- Preceded by: Steve Thomson
- Succeeded by: Don McRae

Minister of Community and Rural Development of British Columbia
- In office June 11, 2010 – October 25, 2010
- Premier: Gordon Campbell
- Preceded by: Bill Bennett
- Succeeded by: Stephanie Cadieux

Minister of Citizens' Services and Minister Responsible for Multiculturalism and the Public Affairs Bureau of British Columbia
- In office June 10, 2009 – June 11, 2010
- Premier: Gordon Campbell
- Preceded by: Wally Oppal
- Succeeded by: Mary McNeil

Personal details
- Born: Kelowna, British Columbia, Canada
- Party: BC United
- Other political affiliations: Conservative (federal)
- Occupation: Vintner

Benjamin Richard Stewart is a Canadian politician who served as a member of the Legislative Assembly of British Columbia (MLA) represented the electoral districts of Westside-Kelowna from 2009 to 2013 and later Kelowna West from 2018 to 2024. A member of BC United (formerly the BC Liberal Party), he served in both cabinets of Gordon Campbell and Christy Clark.

He was first elected in the 2009 provincial election. In the 39th Parliament, as a member of the provincial government he worked as Minister of Citizens' Services (June 2009–June 2010), Minister of Community and Rural Development (June 2010–October 2010), and Minister of Agriculture (October 2010–March 2011). On September 5, 2012, he was reappointed to cabinet as Minister of Citizens' Services and Open Government.

== Background ==
Stewart was born and raised in Kelowna, British Columbia. His grandfather, Dick Sr., had moved to the Okanagan in 1911 where he started a nursery growing fruit and shade trees. Stewart's father Dick Jr. purchased a West Kelowna vineyard in 1956 which Ben would later incorporate as Quails' Gate Estate Winery. Along with his wife, Ruth, and brother, Tony, they began making their own wine in 1989, with bottling beginning in 1990. In the first couple of years, they were producing about 4,000 cases of wine. Sufficient demand allowed them to expand numerous times so that in 1997 they produced 28,000 cases. A $4 million expansion in 1998 increased their production to 60,000 cases. The winery specialized in pinot noirs. Their tasting room and wine shop was located in an historical building, built by one of the first white settlers in the area, before being replaced with a more modern facility during their 2007 expansion.

Stewart was a proponent of attracting tourism to the Okanagan, as well as promoting exports of British Columbia wine. In 2006, their local Chamber of Commerce awarded Stewart their President's Award for his efforts in promoting Okanagan businesses. The next year Quails' Gate Estate Winery was awarded the Canadian Association of Family Enterprise's regional Family Enterprise of the Year Award. Stewart also served as the marketing chair of the BC Wine Institute, chairman of the Vintners Quality Alliance, and as a member of the UBC Okanagan Advisory Council.

== Politics ==
In 2005, following Member of Parliament Werner Schmidt's announcement that he would not stand for re-election in the next federal election, Stewart campaigned to be the next Conservative Party of Canada candidate in the Kelowna—Lake Country riding. While six other candidates ran, Kelowna city councillor Ron Cannan eventually won the Conservative Party nomination and went on to win the 2006 general election. In 2008, following MLA Rick Thorpe's decision not to stand in the next provincial election, and following the re-alignment of electoral boundaries to create the Westside-Kelowna riding, Stewart sought to be the B.C. Liberal Party candidate. Only two candidates stood for the nomination: Stewart and Rick de Jong, brother of then-Aboriginal Relations and Reconciliation Minister Mike de Jong. Stewart won the nomination and was the B.C. Liberal candidate in the 2009 provincial election. He campaigned on an economic platform: that the BC Liberals in power would be more beneficial for the provincial economy than a New Democrat government. Stewart won the election, with 53% of the vote, over the NDP candidate and mental health worker Tish Lakes, who received 29% of the vote and stated "I was never running against Ben Stewart. I was running against the policies of [Liberal leader] Gordon Campbell and the B.C. Liberals."

As the 39th Parliament began, BC Premier Gordon Campbell immediately promoted Stewart to the Executive Council of British Columbia as the Minister of Citizens' Services and the Minister Responsible for Multiculturalism and the Public Affairs Bureau. As minister, Stewart was immediately thrust into the spotlight as allegations against the Public Affairs Bureau arose concerning the suppression of a report, that should have been released prior to the election, showing a 50% increase in welfare enrollments in 2009. Stewart responded with the statement that the bureau was following protocol regarding the release of information during an election campaign and that the same bureau also withheld a report showing positive job growth during the month of April 2009, a month prior to the election. In December 2009 Stewart also had to defend the Ministry of Housing and Social Development who was under investigation regarding the leak of "mailed sensitive government information to someone in the United States" Stewart stated that "We don't exactly know who this other individual is, but it's believed they could be in the United States."

In his October 25, 2010 cabinet re-shuffling, Campbell promoted Stewart to Minister of Agriculture. Within the first few weeks, he toured the Peace River region, which had suffered a dry summer, and spoke about improving ministry programs like Agristability and production insurance. Shortly afterwards, he was consulted by the federal agricultural minister Gerry Ritz regarding Canada farm-disaster aid. Stewart has spoken favourably about local purchasing and considered re-establishing the "Buy B.C." program. Stewart signed a memorandum of understanding with the federal Minister of Fisheries and Oceans Gail Shea for regulating aquaculture as a "shared responsibility". In late 2010, a comprehensive review of the Agricultural Land Commission was done and recommendations submitted to Stewart who said he would review the report and discuss with fellow cabinet ministers before making it public.

In the 2011 BC Liberal Party leadership election, following Campbell's resignation, Stewart endorsed Kevin Falcon, noting his approval of Falcon's "support of deregulation for businesses" and his performance as Minister of Health; however, Christy Clark eventually won. Clark did not include Stewart in her first cabinet, but did appoint him Government Whip. He served on the Special Committee on Cosmetic Pesticides, the Select Standing Committee on Legislative Initiatives, as well as on the BC Liberals Priorities and Planning Committee and Legislative Review Committee.

Stewart was re-elected in the 2013 provincial election. Shortly after, on June 5, he resigned his seat so that Clark, who was defeated in her own riding of Vancouver-Point Grey, could contest the seat in a by-election.

In October 2013, Premier Clark appointed Stewart as BC Special Representative in Asia, a position based in Beijing. He departed the $150,000 salaried position on December 30, 2016, and the position was not re-filled.

In 2018, Stewart returned to politics following Clark's resignation from the legislature and ran to succeed her in a February 14, 2018 by-election in what is now Kelowna West. Ben Stewart won the riding with 56.46% of the votes.

In Opposition, he has served as the Official Opposition Critic for Housing and as the Shadow Minister for Tourism and Trade.

On August 1, 2019, Stewart departed from the BC Liberal Party to sit as an independent due to a matter related to an Elections BC investigation involving him exceeding his contribution limit for the year of 2019. On October 1, 2019, he was cleared by Elections BC and rejoined the Liberal caucus.

== Electoral history ==
2020 British Columbia general election: Kelowna West
Party	Candidate	Votes	%	±%	Expenditures
Liberal	Ben Stewart	12,991	49.89	−6.39	$25,167.49
New Democratic	Spring Hawes	8,854	34.00	+10.49	$3,285.58
Green	Peter Truch	3,274	12.57	−0.10	$3,191.00
Libertarian	Matt Badura	474	1.82	+1.01	$0.00
Independent	Magee Mitchell	446	1.71	–	$472.20
Total valid votes		26,039	100.00	–	
Total rejected ballots					
Turnout					
Registered voters					
Liberal hold		Swing		−8.44	
Source: Elections BC

British Columbia provincial by-election, February 14, 2018: Kelowna West Resignation of Christy Clark
Party	Candidate	Votes	%	±%	Expenditures
Liberal	Ben Stewart	8,406	56.28	−2.77	$87,790
New Democratic	Shelley Cook	3,511	23.51	−1.63	$49,337
Green	Robert Stupka	1,893	12.67	−1.00	$54,984
Conservative	Mark Thompson	1,006	6.73	–	$6,419
Libertarian	Kyle Michael Ernest Geronazzo	121	0.81	–	$250
Total valid votes		14,937	100.00	–	
Total rejected ballots		35	0.23	+0.07	
Turnout		14,972	31.55	−9.29	
Registered voters		47,461			
Liberal hold		Swing		−0.57	
Source: Elections BC

2013 British Columbia general election: Westside-Kelowna
Party	Candidate	Votes	%	±%	Expenditures
Liberal	Ben Stewart	12,405	58.07	+4.75	$74,230
New Democratic	Carole Gordon	6,588	30.84	+1.66	$37,807
Conservative	Brian Guillou	2,368	11.09	-1.94	$4,295
Total valid votes		21,361	100.00	–	
Total rejected ballots		209	0.97	+0.42	
Turnout		21,570	47.52	+0.15	
Registered voters		45,389			
Liberal hold		Swing		+1.55	
Source: Elections BC

B.C. General Election 2009 Westside-Kelowna
Party	Candidate	Votes	%	±	Expenditures
Liberal	Ben Stewart	10,334	53%	n/a	$95,251
NDP	Tish Lakes	5,656	29%	n/a	$26,122
Conservative	Peter Neville	1,772	9%	n/a	$9,705
Green	Robin McKim	1,617	8%	n/a	$1,075
Total Valid Votes		19,379	100%		
Total Rejected Ballots		107	0.55%		
Turnout		19,486	47%		
