= 38th Parliament of British Columbia =

- Majority parliament
- Jun. 8, 2005 – Apr. 14, 2009

Parliament leaders
- Premier: Gordon Campbell; 5 June 2001 – 14 March 2011
- Cabinet: Campbell II
- Leader of the Opposition: Carole James; 17 May 2005 – 19 January 2011

Party caucuses
- Government: Liberal Party
- Opposition: New Democratic Party

Legislative Assembly
- Speaker of the Assembly: Bill Barisoff
- Government House leader: Mike de Jong
- Opposition House leader: Mike Farnworth
- Members: 85 MLA seats

Sovereign
- Monarch: Elizabeth II; 6 February 1952 – 8 September 2022
- Lieutenant governor: Iona Campagnolo; 25 September 2001 – 30 September 2007
- Steven Point; 1 October 2007 – 2 November 2012

Sessions
- 1st session September 12, 2005 – February 14, 2006
- 2nd session February 14, 2006 – February 13, 2007
- 3rd session February 13, 2007 – February 12, 2008
- 4th session February 12, 2008 – February 16, 2009
- 5th session February 16, 2009 – March 31, 2009
← 37th	→ 39th

The 38th Parliament of British Columbia sat from 2005 to 2009, replacing the 37th parliament and being succeeded by the 39th parliament. It was composed of two elements, The Queen represented by the Lieutenant-Governor of British Columbia, Steven Point, and the Legislative Assembly of British Columbia as elected by the general election of British Columbia, Canada, on May 17, 2005. The Speaker of the House was Bill Barisoff.

== Members of the 38th Parliament ==
Member	Party	Electoral district	First elected / previously elected	No.# of term(s)
John van Dongen	Liberal	Abbotsford-Clayburn	1995	4th term
Mike de Jong	Liberal	Abbotsford-Mount Lehman	1994	4th term
Scott Fraser	NDP	Alberni-Qualicum	2005	1st term
Dennis MacKay	Liberal	Bulkley Valley-Stikine	2001	2nd term
Richard Lee	Liberal	Burnaby North	2001	2nd term
Raj Chouhan	NDP	Burnaby-Edmonds	2005	1st term
John Nuraney	Liberal	Burnaby-Willingdon	2001	2nd term
Harry Bloy	Liberal	Burquitlam	2001	2nd term
Bob Simpson	NDP	Cariboo North	2005	1st term
Charlie Wyse	NDP	Cariboo South	2005	1st term
Barry Penner	Liberal	Chilliwack-Kent	1996	3rd term
John Les	Liberal	Chilliwack-Sumas	2001	2nd term
Norm Macdonald	NDP	Columbia River-Revelstoke	2005	1st term
Stan Hagen	Liberal	Comox Valley	1986, (Note: First elected as a Social Credit candidate) 2001	3rd term*
Diane Thorne	NDP	Coquitlam-Maillardville	2005	1st term
Doug Routley	NDP	Cowichan-Ladysmith	2005	1st term
Guy Gentner	NDP	Delta North	2005	1st term
Val Roddick	Liberal	Delta South	1999	3rd term
Bill Bennett	Liberal	East Kootenay	2001	2nd term
Maurine Karagianis	NDP	Esquimalt-Metchosin	2005	1st term
Rich Coleman	Liberal	Fort Langley-Aldergrove	1996	3rd term
Claude Richmond	Liberal	Kamloops	1981, 2001	5th term*
Kevin Krueger	Liberal	Kamloops-North Thompson	1996	3rd term
Al Horning	Liberal	Kelowna-Lake Country	2005	1st term
Sindi Hawkins	Liberal	Kelowna-Mission	1996	3rd term
Mary Polak	Liberal	Langley	2005	1st term
John Horgan	NDP	Malahat-Juan de Fuca	2005	1st term
Randy Hawes	Liberal	Maple Ridge-Mission	2001	2nd term
Michael Sather	NDP	Maple Ridge-Pitt Meadows	2005	1st term
Leonard Krog	NDP	Nanaimo	1991, (Note: Parksville-Qualicum) 2005	3rd term*
Ron Cantelon	Liberal	Nanaimo-Parksville	2005	1st term
Corky Evans	NDP	Nelson-Creston	1991, 2005	3rd term*
Chuck Puchmayr	NDP	New Westminster	2005	1st term
Gary Coons	NDP	North Coast	2005	1st term
Claire Trevena	NDP	North Island	2005	1st term
Katherine Whittred	Liberal	North Vancouver-Lonsdale	1996	3rd term
Daniel Jarvis	Liberal	North Vancouver-Seymour	1991	4th term
Ida Chong	Liberal	Oak Bay-Gordon Head	1996	3rd term
Tom Christensen	Liberal	Okanagan-Vernon	2001	2nd term
Rick Thorpe	Liberal	Okanagan-Westside	1996	3rd term
Richard Neufeld	Liberal	Peace River North	1991	4th term
Blair Lekstrom	Liberal	Peace River South	2001	2nd term
Bill Barisoff†	Liberal	Penticton-Okanagan Valley	1996	3rd term
Mike Farnworth	NDP	Port Coquitlam-Burke Mountain	1991, 2005	3rd term*
Iain Black	Liberal	Port Moody-Westwood	2005	1st term
Nicholas Simons	NDP	Powell River-Sunshine Coast	2005	1st term
Pat Bell	Liberal	Prince George North	2001	2nd term
Shirley Bond	Liberal	Prince George-Mount Robson	2001	2nd term
John Rustad	Liberal	Prince George-Omineca	2005	1st term
Olga Ilich	Liberal	Richmond Centre	2005	1st term
Linda Reid	Liberal	Richmond East	1991	4th term
John Yap	Liberal	Richmond-Steveston	2005	1st term
Murray Coell	Liberal	Saanich North and the Islands	1996	3rd term
David Cubberley	NDP	Saanich South	2005	1st term
George Abbott	Liberal	Shuswap	1996	3rd term
Robin Austin	NDP	Skeena	2005	1st term
Kevin Falcon	Liberal	Surrey-Cloverdale	2001	2nd term
Sue Hammell	NDP	Surrey-Green Timbers	1991, 2005	3rd term*
Harry Bains	NDP	Surrey-Newton	2005	1st term
Jagrup Brar	NDP	Surrey-Panorama Ridge	2004	2nd term
Dave Hayer	Liberal	Surrey-Tynehead	2001	2nd term
Bruce Ralston	NDP	Surrey-Whalley	2005	1st term
Gordon Hogg	Liberal	Surrey-White Rock	1997	3rd term
Lorne Mayencourt	Liberal	Vancouver-Burrard	2001	2nd term
Spencer Chandra Herbert (2008)	NDP	Vancouver-Burrard	2008	1st term
Gregor Robertson	NDP	Vancouver-Fairview	2005	1st term
Jenn McGinn (2008)	NDP	Vancouver-Fairview	2008	1st term
Wally Oppal	Liberal	Vancouver-Fraserview	2005	1st term
Shane Simpson	NDP	Vancouver-Hastings	2005	1st term
David Chudnovsky	NDP	Vancouver-Kensington	2005	1st term
Adrian Dix	NDP	Vancouver-Kingsway	2005	1st term
Carole Taylor	Liberal	Vancouver-Langara	2005	1st term
Jenny Kwan	NDP	Vancouver-Mount Pleasant	1996	3rd term
Gordon Campbell	Liberal	Vancouver-Point Grey	1994	4th term
Colin Hansen	Liberal	Vancouver-Quilchena	1996	3rd term
Carole James	NDP	Victoria-Beacon Hill	2005	1st term
Rob Fleming	NDP	Victoria-Hillside	2005	1st term
Katrine Conroy	NDP	West Kootenay-Boundary	2005	1st term
Ralph Sultan	Liberal	West Vancouver-Capilano	2001	2nd term
Joan McIntyre	Liberal	West Vancouver-Garibaldi	2005	1st term
Harry Lali	NDP	Yale-Lillooet	1991, 2005	3rd term*

†Speaker.

Three seats in the legislature were vacant when the assembly was dissolved: Comox Valley following the death in office of Stan Hagen, Peace River North following the appointment of Richard Neufeld to the Senate of Canada, and Vancouver-Langara following the resignation of Carole Taylor. As all three vacancies occurred less than six months before the next provincial election, by-elections were not held to fill the vacancies before the regular election.

== Party standings of the 38th Parliament ==
Legislative Chamber

Affiliation	Members	Female Members
Liberal Party	45	9
New Democratic Party	34	8
Total	79	17
Government Majority	11	

Affiliation	Lower Mainland	Interior	Vancouver Island
Liberal Party	27	15	4
New Democratic Party	16	8	9
Total	43	23	13

Source: Legislative Assembly of BC

== Seating plan ==
Horgan	Gentner	Dix	Trevena	Bains	Macdonald	Karagianis	Chandra Herbert	Krog	Evans	Chouhan	Coons	Routley	Hammell	Lali	Cubberley	Conroy	MacKay	Richmond	Rustad
S. Simpson	McGinn	Fleming	Farnworth	James	Kwan	Ralston	B. Simpson	Austin	Wyse	Brar	Thorne	Simons	Puchmayr	Fraser	Sather	Chudnovsky	Hawes	Yap	Vacant
Barisoff
Lekstrom	Vacant	Oppal	de Jong	Campbell	Hansen	Bond	van Dongen	Abbott	Penner	Coleman	Cantelon	Thorpe	Ilich	Hawkins	Roddick	Sultan	Whittred	Vacant
Falcon	Reid	Coell	McIntyre	Chong	Christensen	Polak	Bell	Krueger	Bennett	Black	Hogg	Les	Hayer	Lee	Jarvis	Nuraney	Horning	Bloy
