= 37th Parliament of British Columbia =

- Majority parliament
- Jun. 19, 2001 – Apr. 19, 2005

Parliament leaders
- Premier: Gordon Campbell; June 5, 2001 – March 14, 2011
- Cabinet: 34th ministry
- Leader of the Opposition: Joy MacPhail; June 16, 2001 – May 17, 2005

Party caucuses
- Government: Liberal Party
- Unrecognized: New Democratic Party

Legislative Assembly
- Speaker of the Assembly: Claude Richmond; June 19, 2001 – May 16, 2005
- Members: 79 MLA seats

Sovereign
- Monarch: Elizabeth II; 6 February 1952 – 8 September 2022
- Lieutenant governor: Garde Gardom; April 21, 1995 – September 25, 2001
- Iona Campagnolo; September 25, 2001 – September 30, 2007
| ← 36th | → 38th |

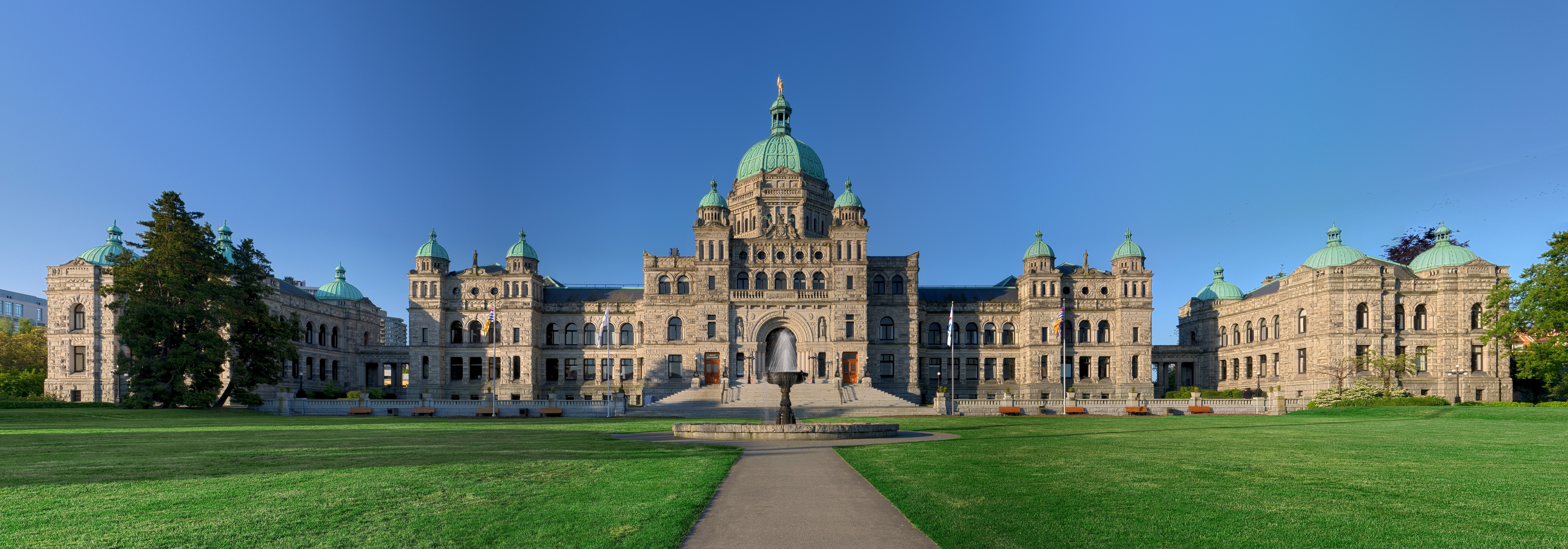
Located in Victoria, British Columbia and officially opened in 1898 with a 500-foot-long facade (150 m), central dome, two end pavilions, and a gold-covered statue of Captain George Vancouver, the British Columbia Parliament Buildings is home to the Legislative Assembly of British Columbia.

The 37th Parliament of British Columbia sat from 2001 to 2005. The members of the 37th Parliament were elected in the British Columbia general election held on May 16, 2001.

== Members of the 37th Parliament ==
| Member | Party | Electoral district | First elected / previously elected | No.# of term(s) |
|---|---|---|---|---|
| John van Dongen | Liberal | Abbotsford-Clayburn | 1995 | 3rd term |
| Mike de Jong | Liberal | Abbotsford-Mount Lehman | 1994 | 3rd term |
| Gillian Trumper | Liberal | Alberni-Qualicum | 2001 | 1st term |
| Dennis MacKay | Liberal | Bulkley Valley-Stikine | 2001 | 1st term |
| Richard Lee | Liberal | Burnaby North | 2001 | 1st term |
| Patty Sahota | Liberal | Burnaby-Edmonds | 2001 | 1st term |
| John Nuraney | Liberal | Burnaby-Willingdon | 2001 | 1st term |
| Harry Bloy | Liberal | Burquitlam | 2001 | 1st term |
| John Wilson | Liberal | Cariboo North | 1996 | 2nd term |
| Walt Cobb | Liberal | Cariboo South | 2001 | 1st term |
| Barry Penner | Liberal | Chilliwack-Kent | 1996 | 2nd term |
| John Les | Liberal | Chilliwack-Sumas | 2001 | 1st term |
| Wendy McMahon | Liberal | Columbia River-Revelstoke | 2001 | 1st term |
| Stan Hagen | Liberal | Comox Valley | 1986, (Note: First elected as a Social Credit candidate) 2001 | 2nd term* |
| Richard Stewart | Liberal | Coquitlam-Maillardville | 2001 | 1st term |
| Graham Bruce | Liberal | Cowichan-Ladysmith | 1986, 2001 | 2nd term* |
| Reni Masi | Liberal | Delta North | 1996 | 2nd term |
| Val Roddick | Liberal | Delta South | 1999 | 2nd term |
| Bill Bennett | Liberal | East Kootenay | 2001 | 1st term |
| Arnie Hamilton | Liberal | Esquimalt-Metchosin | 2001 | 1st term |
| Rich Coleman | Liberal | Fort Langley-Aldergrove | 1996 | 2nd term |
| Claude Richmond | Liberal | Kamloops | 1981, 2001 | 4th term* |
| Kevin Krueger | Liberal | Kamloops-North Thompson | 1996 | 2nd term |
| John Weisbeck | Liberal | Kelowna-Lake Country | 1996 | 2nd term |
| Sindi Hawkins | Liberal | Kelowna-Mission | 1996 | 2nd term |
| Lynn Stephens | Liberal | Langley | 1991 | 3rd term |
| Brian Kerr | Liberal | Malahat-Juan de Fuca | 2001 | 1st term |
| Randy Hawes | Liberal | Maple Ridge-Mission | 2001 | 1st term |
| Ken Stewart | Liberal | Maple Ridge-Pitt Meadows | 2001 | 1st term |
| Mike Hunter | Liberal | Nanaimo | 2001 | 1st term |
| Judith Reid | Liberal | Nanaimo-Parksville | 1998 | 2nd term |
| Blair Suffredine | Liberal | Nelson-Creston | 2001 | 1st term |
| Joyce Murray | Liberal | New Westminster | 2001 | 1st term |
| Bill Belsey | Liberal | North Coast | 2001 | 1st term |
| Rod Visser | Liberal | North Island | 2001 | 1st term |
| Katherine Whittred | Liberal | North Vancouver-Lonsdale | 1996 | 2nd term |
| Daniel Jarvis | Liberal | North Vancouver-Seymour | 1991 | 3rd term |
| Ida Chong | Liberal | Oak Bay-Gordon Head | 1996 | 2nd term |
| Tom Christensen | Liberal | Okanagan-Vernon | 2001 | 1st term |
| Rick Thorpe | Liberal | Okanagan-Westside | 1996 | 2nd term |
| Richard Neufeld | Liberal | Peace River North | 1991 | 3rd term |
| Blair Lekstrom | Liberal | Peace River South | 2001 | 1st term |
| Bill Barisoff | Liberal | Penticton-Okanagan Valley | 1996 | 2nd term |
| Karn Manhas | Liberal | Port Coquitlam-Burke Mountain | 2001 | 1st term |
| Christy Clark | Liberal | Port Moody-Westwood | 1996 | 2nd term |
| Harold Long | Liberal | Powell River-Sunshine Coast | 1986, 2001 | 2nd term* |
| Pat Bell | Liberal | Prince George North | 2001 | 1st term |
| Shirley Bond | Liberal | Prince George-Mount Robson | 2001 | 1st term |
| Paul Nettleton | Liberal | Prince George-Omineca | 1996 | 2nd term |
| Paul Nettleton | Independent | Prince George-Omineca | 1996 | 2nd term |
| Greg Halsey-Brandt | Liberal | Richmond Centre | 2001 | 1st term |
| Linda Reid | Liberal | Richmond East | 1991 | 3rd term |
| Geoff Plant | Liberal | Richmond-Steveston | 1996 | 2nd term |
| Murray Coell | Liberal | Saanich North and the Islands | 1996 | 2nd term |
| Susan Brice | Liberal | Saanich South | 2001 | 1st term |
| George Abbott | Liberal | Shuswap | 1996 | 2nd term |
| Roger Harris | Liberal | Skeena | 2001 | 1st term |
| Kevin Falcon | Liberal | Surrey-Cloverdale | 2001 | 1st term |
| Brenda Locke | Liberal | Surrey-Green Timbers | 2001 | 1st term |
| Tony Bhullar | Liberal | Surrey-Newton | 2001 | 1st term |
| Tony Bhullar | Independent | Surrey-Newton | 2001 | 1st term |
| Tony Bhullar | Liberal | Surrey-Newton | 2001 | 1st term |
| Gulzar Cheema | Liberal | Surrey-Panorama Ridge | 2001 | 1st term |
| Jagrup Brar (2004) | NDP | Surrey-Panorama Ridge | 2004 | 1st term |
| Dave Hayer | Liberal | Surrey-Tynehead | 2001 | 1st term |
| Elayne Brenzinger | Liberal | Surrey-Whalley | 2001 | 1st term |
| Elayne Brenzinger | Independent | Surrey-Whalley | 2001 | 1st term |
| Elayne Brenzinger | Democratic Reform | Surrey-Whalley | 2001 | 1st term |
| Gordon Hogg | Liberal | Surrey-White Rock | 1997 | 2nd term |
| Lorne Mayencourt | Liberal | Vancouver-Burrard | 2001 | 1st term |
| Gary Collins | Liberal | Vancouver-Fairview | 1991 | 3rd term |
| Ken Johnston | Liberal | Vancouver-Fraserview | 2001 | 1st term |
| Joy MacPhail | NDP | Vancouver-Hastings | 1991 | 3rd term |
| Patrick Wong | Liberal | Vancouver-Kensington | 2001 | 1st term |
| Rob Nijjar | Liberal | Vancouver-Kingsway | 2001 | 1st term |
| Val J. Anderson | Liberal | Vancouver-Langara | 1991 | 3rd term |
| Jenny Kwan | NDP | Vancouver-Mount Pleasant | 1996 | 2nd term |
| Gordon Campbell | Liberal | Vancouver-Point Grey | 1994 | 3rd term |
| Colin Hansen | Liberal | Vancouver-Quilchena | 1996 | 2nd term |
| Jeff Bray | Liberal | Victoria-Beacon Hill | 2001 | 1st term |
| Sheila Orr | Liberal | Victoria-Hillside | 2001 | 1st term |
| Sandy Santori | Liberal | West Kootenay-Boundary | 2001 | 1st term |
| Ralph Sultan | Liberal | West Vancouver-Capilano | 2001 | 1st term |
| Ted Nebbeling | Liberal | West Vancouver-Garibaldi | 1996 | 2nd term |
| David Chutter | Liberal | Yale-Lillooet | 2001 | 1st term |

== Members of the 37th Parliament who resigned ==
- Gulzar Cheema, Liberal – Surrey-Panorama Ridge
- Gary Farrell-Collins, Liberal – Vancouver-Fairview
- Sandy Santori, Liberal – West Kootenay-Boundary

== Members of the 37th Parliament elected in byelections ==
- Jagrup Brar, N.D.P. – Surrey-Panorama Ridge

== Party standings of the 37th Parliament at investiture ==
| **** | **** | **** | **** | **** | **** | **** | **** | **** | **** | * | **** | **** | **** | **** | **** | **** | **** | **** | **** | **** |
| **** | **** | **** | **** | **** | **** | **** | **** | **** | **** | * | **** | **** | **** | **** | **** | **** | **** | **** | **** | **** | **** |
****
****
****
| **** | **** | **** | **** | **** | **** | **** | **** | **** | **** | * | **** | **** | **** | **** | **** | **** | **** | **** | **** | **** |
| **** | **** | **** | **** | **** | **** | **** | **** | **** | **** | * | **** | **** | **** | **** | **** | **** | **** | **** | **** | **** |

| | | Lwr. M. | Int. | Van. I. | Total |
| BC Liberal Party | * | 41 | 23 | 13 | 77 |
| New Democratic Party of BC | * | 2 | 0 | 0 | 2 |
| | | 43 | 23 | 13 | 79 |

== Party standings of the 37th Parliament at Dissolution ==
| **** | **** | **** | **** | **** | **** | **** | **** | **** | **** | * | **** | **** | **** | **** | **** | **** | **** | **** | **** | **** |
| **** | **** | **** | **** | **** | **** | **** | **** | **** | **** | * | **** | **** | **** | **** | **** | **** | **** | **** | **** | **** | **** |
****
****
****
| **** | **** | **** | **** | **** | **** | **** | **** | **** | **** | * | **** | **** | **** | **** | **** | **** | **** | **** | **** | **** |
| **** | **** | **** | **** | **** | **** | **** | **** | **** | **** | * | **** | **** | **** | **** | **** | **** | **** | **** | **** | **** |

| | | Lwr. M. | Int. | Van. I. | Total |
| BC Liberal Party | * | 38 | 21 | 13 | 72 |
| New Democratic Party of BC | * | 3 | | | 3 |
| Democratic Reform BC | * | 1 | | | 1 |
| Independent | * | | 1 | | 1 |
| Vacant | * | 1 | 1 | | 2 |
| | | 43 | 23 | 13 | 79 |
