= Dallas Brodie =

Canadian politician (born 1962)

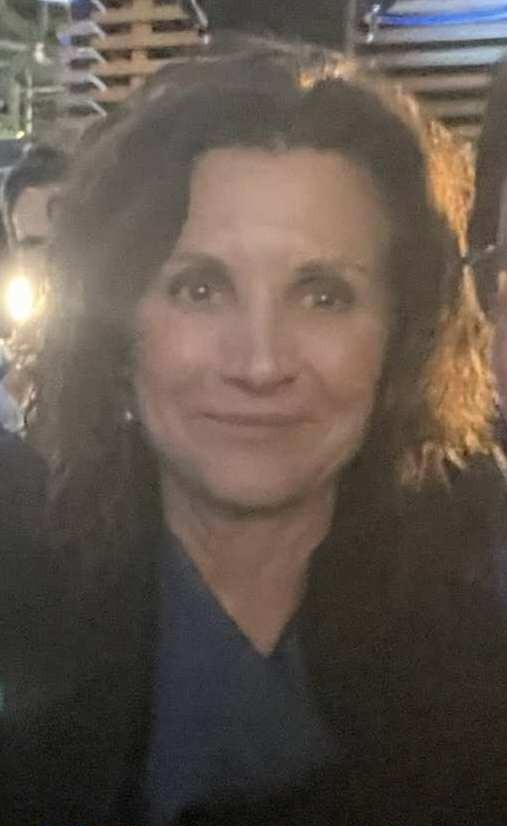
- Brodie in 2024

Interim Leader of OneBC
- Incumbent
- Assumed office December 21, 2025
- Preceded by: Herself
- In office June 9, 2025 – December 13, 2025
- Preceded by: Position established
- Succeeded by: Herself

Official Opposition Critic of the Ministry of Attorney General of British Columbia
- In office November 20, 2024 – March 7, 2025
- Leader: John Rustad
- Shadowing: Niki Sharma
- Preceded by: Mike de Jong
- Succeeded by: Vacant

Member of the British Columbia Legislative Assembly for Vancouver-Quilchena
- In office October 19, 2024 – October 24, 2026
- Preceded by: Kevin Falcon
- Succeeded by: Carson Binda

Personal details
- Born: Dallas Monique Brodie; February 7, 1962 (age 64) Vancouver, British Columbia, Canada
- Party: OneBC (2025–present)
- Other political affiliations: BC Conservative (until 2025); Independent (2025)
- Education: Princeton University (BA); University of Toronto (JD); British Columbia Institute of Technology

Dallas Monique Brodie (born February 7, 1962) is a Canadian politician and lawyer who has served as interim leader of OneBC since 2025. She served as a member of the Legislative Assembly of British Columbia (MLA) representing the electoral district of Vancouver-Quilchena from 2024 to 2026.

Initially elected as a member of the BC Conservatives, Brodie was expelled from its caucus in 2025 after party leader John Rustad said she had mocked testimony from residential school survivors. Her statements about residential schools have drawn condemnation from Indigenous organizations and have been identified as residential school denialism.

== Early life and career ==
Brodie was born in Vancouver in 1962. She graduated from Princeton University with a bachelor of arts in political science, the University of Toronto Faculty of Law with a juris doctor, and the British Columbia Institute of Technology with a certificate in broadcasting journalism.

As a lawyer, Brodie worked as an arbitrator at British Columbia's Residential Tenancy Branch, which deals with landlord-tenant disputes, for a decade before quitting in 2017. She criticized underfunding of the body, saying arbitrators were paid less than comparable lawyers and overworked to meet required deadlines. She also worked as a criminal defence lawyer, taking on Legal Aid BC youth cases.

Brodie worked in broadcasting as a Canadian Broadcasting Corporation producer in Toronto and Ottawa, and subsequently at CKNW in Vancouver and as a weekly host at CITR-FM at the University of British Columbia. While at UBC, she travelled to Israel with the campus Hillel organization.

== Political career ==
=== Conservative Party of BC ===
Brodie ran as the BC Conservative candidate in the April 2022 Vancouver-Quilchena by-election, placing fourth with 6.6% of the vote. The seat was won by BC Liberal leader Kevin Falcon. That year, she donated $3,350 to the federal People's Party of Canada.

During an all-candidates debate in the 2024 general election, Brodie addressed comments she had previously made about First Nations on a podcast. Speaking about Indigenous people in Vancouver's Downtown Eastside, she said First Nations should take responsibility for their members living there. Stewart Phillip, grand chief of the Union of British Columbia Indian Chiefs, condemned her comments. The Conservatives released a statement in which Brodie said she had been interrupted before she could finish with a call for reconciliation. Rustad rejected calls to remove her as a candidate, saying voters could judge her.

Brodie was elected in Vancouver-Quilchena with 51.6% of the vote. She was subsequently named the opposition's attorney general critic.

In February 2025, Brodie posted on X that there were no confirmed child burials at the former Kamloops Indian Residential School site. The Union of British Columbia Indian Chiefs condemned her posts as residential school denialism and called for an apology. Rustad asked her to remove the post, but she refused. Conservative house leader Áʼa꞉líya Warbus criticized it as harmful and a distraction from other issues.

During an online discussion hosted by Frances Widdowson the following month, Brodie criticized Warbus and suggested she should join the New Democratic Party. The video prompted Métis Nation British Columbia to call for Brodie's removal from caucus. On March 7, Rustad expelled her, saying she had used her position as an MLA to mock testimony from victims of abuse, including child sexual abuse.

=== OneBC ===
On June 9, 2025, Brodie and fellow independent MLA Tara Armstrong, who had left the Conservative caucus, formed OneBC, with Brodie serving as interim leader.

Brodie introduced private members' bills seeking to ban land acknowledgements, end provincial recognition of the National Day for Truth and Reconciliation, and repeal the Declaration on the Rights of Indigenous Peoples Act (DRIPA). These proposals were defeated at first reading. Chief Rosanne Casimir called for her resignation, while Premier David Eby supported efforts to recall her.

On December 2, 2025, the OneBC caucus released Making a Killing: Reconciliation, Genocide and the Plunder of Canada, a documentary produced using public caucus funds. The film promoted residential school denialism and drew condemnation from the provincial government.

On December 13, OneBC's board voted to remove Brodie as interim leader. Armstrong said she had lost confidence in Brodie and would no longer caucus with her, while Brodie disputed her removal. Brodie regained control of the party on December 21 after Armstrong, executive director Paul Ratchford and chief of staff Tim Thielmann resigned from its board and transferred control to her.

Brodie organized events on university campuses opposing what she called Canada's reconciliation industry. On December 2, 2025, OneBC supporters gathered at the University of Victoria without authorization. Police escorted the group off campus after a university official informed them they were trespassing. One person was arrested under the Trespass Act and later released.

A similar event at the University of British Columbia on January 22, 2026, drew hundreds of opponents. Police intervened between participants, and campus security directed Brodie and her supporters to leave because of safety concerns. A OneBC supporter was arrested for failing to follow police directions and later released.

==== Recall campaign ====
A recall petition against Brodie was issued in May 2026. Its proponents argued that she had prioritized OneBC over her constituents and neglected issues such as affordability, health care and community services. Brodie defended her record and alleged that the campaign was organized by NDP activists outside her riding.

The campaign collected 3,663 signatures, falling short of the 15,232 required to trigger a by-election. Organizers acknowledged the petition's failure but said it had engaged thousands of residents. It gathered more signatures than any other recall campaign in British Columbia during the preceding decade.

==== 2026 provincial election ====
In September 2026, Conservative MLA Brent Chapman joined OneBC, becoming its second caucus member.

Brodie led OneBC into the 2026 general election, campaigning against Indigenous land transfers and what she described as the reconciliation industry. She was defeated in Vancouver-Quilchena by Conservative candidate Carson Binda. OneBC failed to win any seats.

== Political views ==
Brodie opposes what she describes as race-based laws and has advocated repealing SOGI 123 and diversity, equity and inclusion policies. She has called for cutting personal and corporate taxes and defunding what she calls the reconciliation industry.

Her statements disputing findings at former residential school sites have been condemned as residential school denialism by Indigenous organizations. In November 2025, an Indigenous delegation left the legislature after Brodie accused the Kamloops Indian Band of misrepresenting findings at the former Kamloops Indian Residential School.

Brodie supports Israel and participated in the March of the Living program in Poland through the Canada-Israel Committee. On August 20, 2025, she announced that she had initiated a private prosecution against Charlotte Kates, a co-founder of Samidoun, which the Canadian government designated a terrorist entity in 2024.

== Personal life ==
Brodie lives in Vancouver with her family.

== Electoral history ==
2026 British Columbia general election: Vancouver-Quilchena
** Preliminary results — Not yet official **
Party	Candidate	Votes	%	±%
Conservative	Carson Binda	10,956	55.02	+3.45
New Democratic	Callista Ryan	5,269	26.46	−12.45
Green	Douglas Courtemanche	1,844	9.26	+1.48
CentreBC	Petra Kuret	1,038	5.21	–
OneBC	Dallas Brodie	805	4.04	–
Total valid votes		19,912	99.86	
Total rejected ballots		27	0.14	−0.01
Turnout		19,939		
Registered voters				
Conservative hold		Swing		+7.95
Note: Incumbent MLA Dallas Brodie was elected as a Conservative in 2024, but was expelled from the caucus on March 7, 2025. On June 9, 2025, she founded and joined OneBC.
Source: Elections BC

2024 British Columbia general election: Vancouver-Quilchena
Party	Candidate	Votes	%	±%	Expenditures
Conservative	Dallas Brodie	11,464	51.58	–	
New Democratic	Callista Ryan	8,649	38.91	+10.35	
Green	Michael Barkusky	1,729	7.78	−7.62	
Independent	Caroline Ying-Mei Wang	385	1.73	–	
Total valid votes		22,227	99.86	–	
Total rejected ballots		32	0.14		
Turnout		22,259			
Registered voters		38,080			
Conservative notional gain from BC United		Swing		–	
Source: Elections BC

British Columbia provincial by-election, April 30, 2022: Vancouver-Quilchena Resignation of Andrew Wilkinson
Party	Candidate	Votes	%	±%	Expenditures
Liberal	Kevin Falcon	6,200	58.61	+2.57	$117,930.56
New Democratic	Jeanette Ashe	2,590	24.48	–4.08	$75,850.61
Green	Wendy Hayko	1,025	9.69	–5.71	$32,855.66
Conservative	Dallas Brodie	698	6.60	–	$33,166.75
Libertarian	Sandra Filosof-Schipper	66	0.62	–	$636.31
Total valid votes		10,579	99.95	–	
Total rejected ballots		5	0.05	–0.46	
Turnout		10,584	27.56	–27.56	
Registered voters		38,399			
Liberal hold		Swing		+3.33	
Source: Elections BC

== See also ==
- 43rd Parliament of British Columbia
