= Andrew Wilkinson =

Canadian politician (born 1958)

Andrew Wilkinson KC
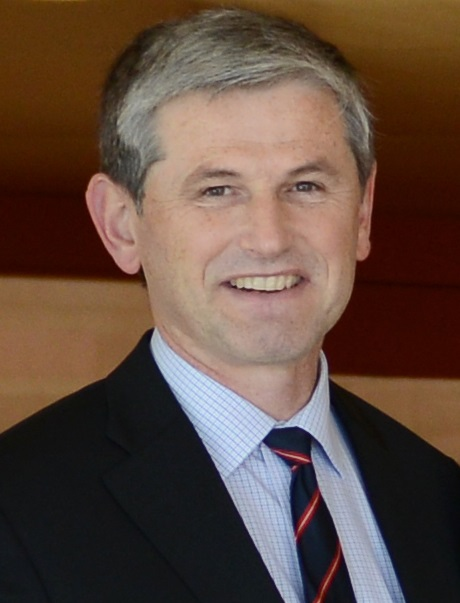

Leader of the Opposition of British Columbia
- In office February 3, 2018 – November 21, 2020
- Preceded by: Rich Coleman
- Succeeded by: Shirley Bond

Member of the British Columbia Legislative Assembly for Vancouver-Quilchena
- In office May 14, 2013 – February 17, 2022
- Preceded by: Colin Hansen
- Succeeded by: Kevin Falcon

Leader of the BC Liberal Party
- In office February 3, 2018 – November 23, 2020
- Preceded by: Rich Coleman (interim)
- Succeeded by: Shirley Bond (interim)

Attorney General of British Columbia
- In office June 12, 2017 – July 17, 2017
- Premier: Christy Clark
- Preceded by: Suzanne Anton
- Succeeded by: David Eby

Minister of Advanced Education
- In office December 18, 2014 – June 12, 2017
- Preceded by: Amrik Virk
- Succeeded by: Linda Reid

Minister of Technology, Innovation and Citizens' Services
- In office June 10, 2013 – December 17, 2014
- Premier: Christy Clark
- Preceded by: Ben Stewart
- Succeeded by: Amrik Virk

Personal details
- Born: 1957 (age 68–69) Brisbane, Australia
- Party: BC Liberal
- Education: Magdalen College, Oxford; University of Alberta (M.D.); Dalhousie University; (LL.B.)
- Profession: Physician; lawyer; doctor

Andrew Wilkinson KC (born 1957) is a Canadian politician. He is the former leader of the British Columbia Liberal Party and served as the leader of British Columbia's Official Opposition from 2018 to 2020. He was elected to the Legislative Assembly of British Columbia in the 2013 provincial election and re-elected in 2017 and 2020, representing the electoral district of Vancouver-Quilchena.

Following his election, Wilkinson was appointed to the Christy Clark ministry, serving as Minister of Technology, Innovation and Citizens' Services from 2013 to 2014, Minister of Advanced Education from 2014 to 2017, and Minister of Justice and Attorney General in 2017.

Following the BC Liberal government defeat in 2017 and Clark's resignation as leader, he successfully stood in the 2018 BC Liberal Party leadership election. Wilkinson led the party into the 2020 British Columbia general election but lost the election to the NDP led by John Horgan and resigned as leader shortly after. In 2022, he resigned from the Legislature to open a seat for new BC Liberal leader Kevin Falcon.

== Early life and education ==
Wilkinson was born in Brisbane, Australia. His family migrated to Canada when he was four and he grew up in Kamloops.

Wilkinson attended medical school at the University of Alberta. Three years into medical school, he was awarded a Rhodes Scholarship to study at the University of Oxford where he obtained his first law degree. He then returned to the University of Alberta to finish his M.D.

After medical school, Wilkinson worked for a few years as a doctor in Campbell River, Lillooet and Dease Lake before making the switch to law.

He received his LL.B. from Dalhousie University in 1987 and was called to the British Columbia bar in 1988. Wilkinson’s legal practice was in litigation, including defending doctors, with numerous trials and appeals, including the Supreme Court of Canada. He was appointed Queen’s Counsel in 2008.

Wilkinson was president of the BC Civil Liberties Association and the BC Mountaineering Club in the early 1990s.

In 2006, after leaving his post as a deputy minister in Gordon Campbell's BC Liberal government, Wilkinson joined the Vancouver office of McCarthy Tétrault, a major national law firm, where he practised as a litigator.

== Political career ==
=== Political beginnings ===
Wilkinson served as the president of the BC Liberal Party from 1998 to 2001. After the party formed the largest majority government in the province's history in 2001, party leader Gordon Campbell appointed Wilkinson to be the deputy minister responsible for intergovernmental relations.

In 2003, he was transferred to the position of deputy minister for the Ministry of Small Business and Economic Development, where he was responsible for economic issues, trade and tourism. He returned to the private sector in 2006, becoming a partner in the Litigation Group of McCarthy Tétrault. He remained active in Liberal politics in the intervening years, having served as riding president of federal MP Joyce Murray and briefly as BC campaign co-chair to Michael Ignatieff's federal election campaign.

With the 2013 election approaching and Colin Hansen retiring in his Vancouver-Quilchena riding, Wilkinson stood for the BC Liberal nomination. The nomination was also contested by Vancouver city councillor Suzanne Anton, but Wilkinson but won the nomination. Anton then shifted to the Vancouver-Fraserview riding where another BC Liberal incumbent was retiring. He easily won the Vancouver-Quilchena riding in the 2013 British Columbia general election with over 60% of the vote as his party won the election and formed a majority government.

=== 40th Parliament ===
As the 40th Parliament of British Columbia began, Premier Christy Clark appointed Wilkinson as the Minister of Technology, Innovation and Citizens' Services on June 10, 2013. In the role, he was responsible for the selloff of government land. Amongst the sales was 5750 Panorama Drive in Surrey to Fairborne Lands LTD that had been previously earmarked as the site for a new hospital by premier Gordon Campbell. Wilkinson also oversaw the designing of the BC Services Card to combine drivers' licenses and CareCards. On December 17, 2014, Premier Clark had Wilkinson and Amrik Virk exchanged Ministries and Wilkinson became the new Minister of Advanced Education. In this role, he introduced his first two bills, both on February 11, 2015. The Chartered Professional Accountants Act (Bill 4) merged chartered accountants, certified general accountants and management accountants into one professional regulatory body. The Private Training Act (Bill 7) repealed the 37th Parliament's Private Career Training Institutions Act and moved regulation to the Private Training Institutions Branch of the Ministry of Advanced Education, ending the industry's ability to self-regulate. In 2016, he introduced one final bill before the parliament ended, the Sexual Violence and Misconduct Policy Act which requires all public post-secondary institutions establish a sexual misconduct policy.

Following a January 2017 article in The New York Times entitled "British Columbia: The 'Wild West' of Canadian Political Cash" Wilkinson was delegated to speak on behalf of the BC Liberal party, saying: "No one gets special treatment by being a campaign donor," and "It's a system that works." B.C. has since banned corporate and Union donations. During the 41st Parliament Wilkinson sponsored several private member bills. On September 13, 2017, he introduced the Election Amendment Act, 2017 (Bill M-201) which proposed to ban corporate and union political donations, impose a $5,000 annual limit for political contributions by individuals, ban loans except from Canadian banks or credit unions and ban in-kind donations of staff.

=== 41st Parliament ===
In the 2017 BC election Wilkinson again ran for office with the BC Liberal Party in the Vancouver-Quilchena riding and was reelected with 56% of the vote. The BC Liberal Party won the largest number of seats on election night but not enough to form a majority government. This led to their defeat on a confidence vote on June 29, 2017. The NDP and the BC Greens came to an agreement to allow the NDP to form government.

During the 41st Parliament Wilkinson sponsored several private member bills. On September 13, 2017, he introduced the Election Amendment Act, 2017 (Bill M-201) which proposed to ban corporate and union political donations, impose a $5,000 annual limit for political contributions by individuals, ban loans except from Canadian banks or credit unions and ban in-kind donations of staff. While the bill did not proceed, the provisions were adopted in a more comprehensive government bill, Election Amendment Act, 2017 (Bill 3) that same year. On May 14, 2018, he introduced the Strata Pre-Sale Contract Flipping Tax Act, 2018 (Bill M-217) which sought to make 50% of the profit made in selling a condominium before it is available for occupancy subject to income tax. Again, while the bill did not proceed, the government, in Real Estate Development Marketing Amendment Act, 2018 (Bill 25), that same year made these contracts subject to the property transfer tax.

== Leader of the BC Liberal Party ==
Once the BC Liberal Party leadership election was underway to replace Christy Clark, who had announced her resignation on July 28, 2017, Wilkinson announced his candidacy on September 25. He made the announcement at the Pan Pacific Hotel in Coal Harbour with fellow BC Liberal MLAs Michelle Stilwell, Mary Polak and John Rustad, Doug Clovechok and Tom Shypitka endorsing him. He was eventually endorsed by 13 MLAs, the most of any candidate. On the initial ballot he placed third, behind Dianne Watts and Michael Lee, but the contest was decided by ranked voting so that by the fifth and final ballot Wilkinson won with 53% and became leader of the BC Liberal Party and the official opposition on February 3, 2018. At its subsequent annual convention, the party under Wilkinson unveiled a new brand identity with the slogan "Opportunity for All of B.C." to replace Clark's "Today's BC Liberals".

In the 2018 British Columbia electoral reform referendum, the BC Liberal Party under Wilkinson's leadership registered third-party advertising sponsors to support retaining the existing first-past-the-post voting system and reject a proportional representation system. On November 8 he participated in a province-wide televised debate against Premier John Horgan who argued in favour of proportional representation. The result of the referendum was a defeat for the NDP, with 61% voting in favour of continuing with the current first-past-the-post voting system.

On October 10, 2020, the host of This is Vancolour, Mo Amir, released footage of a BC Liberal roast for retiring MLA Ralph Sultan. On the leaked footage, BC Liberal candidate Jane Thornthwaite can be seen making sexist comments of BC NDP candidate Bowinn Ma. The video prompted Wilkinson, Thornthwaite and other BC Liberal Candidates to issue public apologies.

Wilkinson led the BC Liberals during the 2020 British Columbia general election under the slogan "Restore Confidence, Rebuild BC." The platform was centred on a temporary suspension of sales tax, expanded child care and seniors' housing, expanded infrastructure spending, and introducing competition in the auto insurance market. The campaign was marked by controversies, including the ouster of Liberal candidate Laurie Throness, who compared birth control to eugenics, and sexist remarks made by Liberal candidate Jane Thornthwaite towards NDP MLA Bowinn Ma. Wilkinson resigned as leader following the election, in which the BC Liberals lost 14 seats. On November 23, 2020, the BC Liberal Caucus elected Shirley Bond as interim leader. On February 17, 2022, he resigned from the Legislative Assembly of British Columbia to allow for newly-elected BC Liberal leader Kevin Falcon to run in a by-election.

== Electoral history ==
2020 British Columbia general election: Vancouver-Quilchena
Party	Candidate	Votes	%	±%	Expenditures
Liberal	Andrew Wilkinson	12,157	56.04	+0.08	$26,851.98
New Democratic	Heather McQuillan	6,197	28.56	+0.53	$3,729.58
Green	Michael Barkusky	3,341	15.40	+0.58	$659.92
Total valid votes		21,695	99.49	–	
Total rejected ballots		112	0.51	+0.01	
Turnout		21,807	56.52	–5.88	
Registered voters		38,584			
Liberal hold		Swing		–0.23	
Source: Elections BC

2017 British Columbia general election: Vancouver-Quilchena
Party	Candidate	Votes	%	±%	Expenditures
Liberal	Andrew Wilkinson	12,464	55.96	−8.36	$64,283
New Democratic	Madeline Lalonde	6,244	28.03	+2.72	$9,017
Green	Michael Barkusky	3,301	14.82	+7.42	$4,481
Libertarian	William Morrison	265	1.19	–	$346
Total valid votes		22,274	99.50	–	
Total rejected ballots		112	0.50	+0.02	
Turnout		22,386	62.39	+2.95	
Registered voters		35,878			
Liberal hold		Swing		−5.54	
Source: Elections BC

2013 British Columbia general election: Vancouver-Quilchena
Party	Candidate	Votes	%	±%	Expenditures
Liberal	Andrew Wilkinson	14,496	64.32	−5.91	$99,877
New Democratic	Nicholas Scapillati	5,705	25.31	+4.57	$30,366
Green	Damian Kettlewell	1,667	7.40	−1.64	$2,267
No Affiliation	Bill Clarke	671	2.98	–	$14,738
Total valid votes		22,539	99.52	–	
Total rejected ballots		108	0.48	−0.09	
Turnout		22,647	59.45	+1.78	
Registered voters		38,095			
Liberal hold		Swing		-5.24	
Source: Elections BC
