= Pavneet Singh =

Canadian politician

Pavneet Singh MLA

Member of the British Columbia Legislative Assembly for Kelowna-Lake Country-Coldstream
- Incumbent
- Assumed office October 24, 2026
- Preceded by: Tara Armstrong

Vice President of the Conservative Party of British Columbia
- Incumbent
- Assumed office August 20, 2026
- President: Mauro Francis
- Preceded by: Sharon White

Personal details
- Party: BC Conservative

Pavneet Singh MLA is a Canadian politician and businessman who has served as a member of the Legislative Assembly of British Columbia (MLA) representing the electoral district of Kelowna-Lake Country-Coldstream since 2026. He is a member of the Conservative Party.

== Early career and education ==
Singh owns several fast-food franchises and gas stations in the Kelowna area.

== Political career ==
Singh was the BC United candidate for the same riding in the 2024 election before he withdrew after his party also withdrew from the election to support the Conservative Party. Singh has been the party's vice-president since August 2026.

In September 2026, Singh ran as a candidate for the BC Conservatives in the 2026 general election running in the electoral district of Kelowna-Lake Country-Coldstream and won.

== Controversies ==
In 2006, Singh was charged in Vernon, British Columbia, with sexual assault, sexual touching of a minor, and unlawful confinement in connection with an alleged incident in July of that year. All three charges were stayed by Crown prosecutors in February 2008, before the case proceeded to trial. After the allegations resurfaced during the 2026 provincial election campaign, Singh denied any wrongdoing, stating that he had been falsely accused and had no criminal record.

== Personal life ==
Singh has lived in the Okanagan for more than 25 years.

== Electoral history ==
2026 British Columbia general election: Kelowna-Lake Country-Coldstream
** Preliminary results — Not yet official **
Party	Candidate	Votes	%	±%
Conservative	Pavneet Singh	11,488	47.70	
New Democratic	Binny Boparai	7,853	32.61	
OneBC	Alexandra Wright	2,705	11.23	–
Green	Carter Mochinski	1,983	8.23	
Total valid votes		24,029	99.78	
Total rejected ballots		53	0.22	
Turnout		24,082		
Registered voters				
Conservative hold		Swing		−1.89
Source: Elections BC
