= Tara Armstrong =

Canadian politician

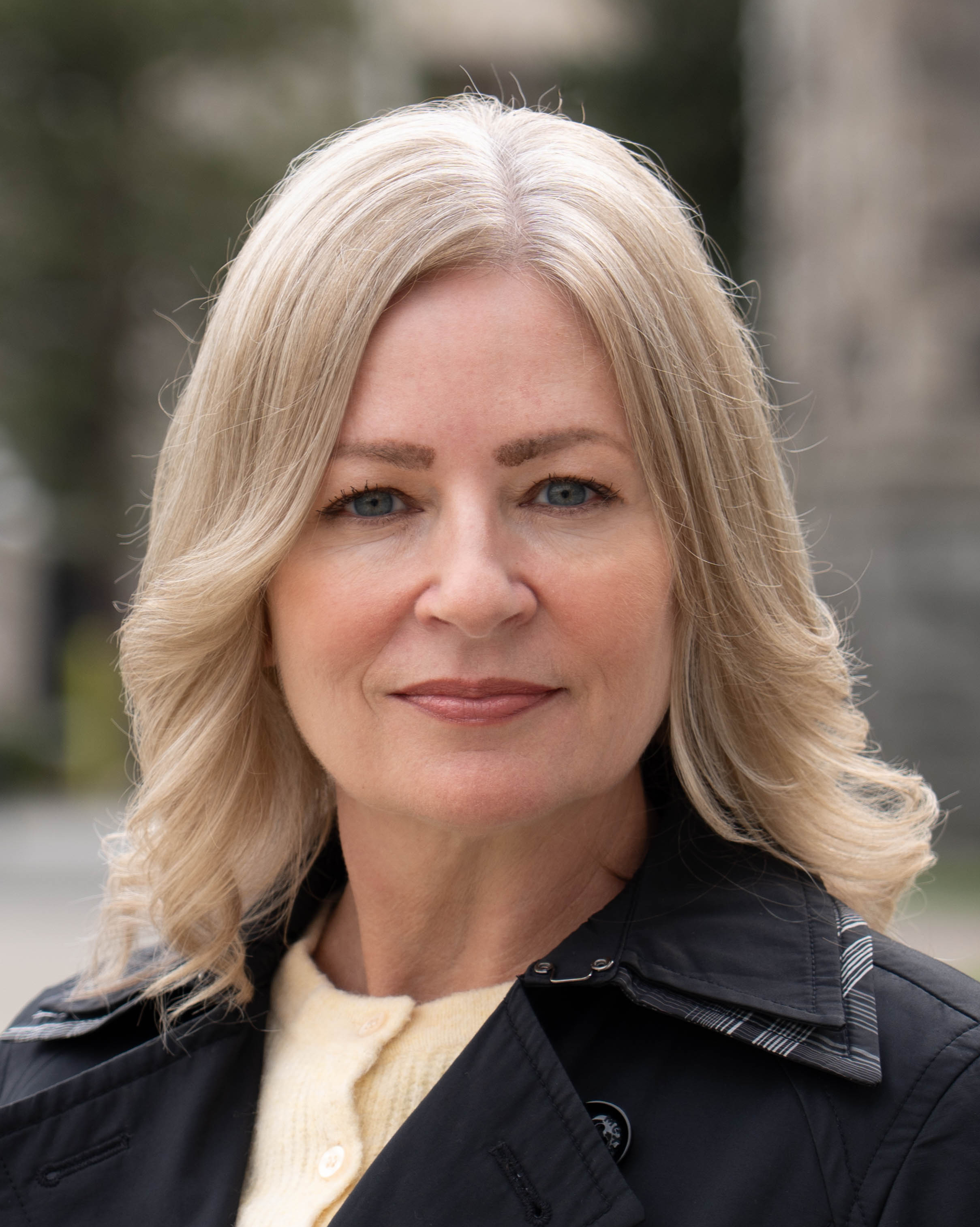
- Armstrong in 2026

House Leader of OneBC in the Legislative Assembly of British Columbia
- In office June 9, 2025 – December 16, 2025
- Leader: Dallas Brodie (interim)
- Preceded by: Position established
- Succeeded by: Vacant

Member of the British Columbia Legislative Assembly for Kelowna-Lake Country-Coldstream
- In office October 19, 2024 – October 24, 2026
- Preceded by: Constituency established
- Succeeded by: Pavneet Singh

Personal details
- Party: Independent (2025-2025, 2025–present)
- Other political affiliations: BC Conservative (before 2025); OneBC (2025)
- Website: taraarmstrongbc.ca

Tara Armstrong is a Canadian politician who served as a member of the Legislative Assembly of British Columbia (MLA) representing the electoral district of Kelowna-Lake Country-Coldstream from 2024 to 2026. Initially elected as a member of the Conservative Party, she left the party in 2025 and co-founded the OneBC Party with MLA Dallas Brodie. She served as the House leader of OneBC until December 2025, when she left the party and has sat in the Legislature as an Independent.

== Early life and career ==
She has worked with her family's seniors transportation business, Driving Miss Daisy, before joining the Conservative Party as the party's Election Readiness Chair in 2023. In March 2025, she left the Conservative Party to sit as an independent, after the MLA for Vancouver-Quilchena, Dallas Brodie, was ejected from the Conservative Party that labeled Brodie's comments offensive towards survivors of residential schools.

On June 9, 2025, Armstrong and Brodie started a new party called OneBC. In December 2025, Armstrong stated that she had lost confidence in Brodie's ability to serve as leader, leading to her removal as interim leader by OneBC's board of directors.

On December 16, 2025, it was announced by Armstrong that OneBC was no longer represented as a political party in the legislature. Five days later, the Board of Directors, inclusive of Armstrong, Executive Director Paul Ratchford, and Chief of Staff Tim Thielmann, voluntarily transferred control of the party over to Brodie and resigned their positions, reinstating her as interim leader.

In December 2025, a recall campaign targeting Armstrong was announced, with the earliest possible filing date of April 20, 2026. Organizer Wilbur Turner, a 2SLGBTQ+ advocate, cited her "divisive and destructive policies" as a reason for the recall petition.

Armstrong retired at the 2026 British Columbia general election.

== Political views ==
=== Healthcare ===
In November 2023, Armstrong criticized Canadian broadcaster Jody Vance for retweeting a Peter Hotez tweet urging people to get the influenza vaccine and COVID-19 boosters. Armstrong claimed that Hotez was a "total fraud" for not wanting to debate with vaccine skeptics and that he was "bought and paid for by big pharma".

=== Trans people ===
In 2025, Armstrong introduced the Protecting Minors from Gender Transition Act as a private member's bill. The bill proposed to ban puberty blockers, prevent the use of public funds for gender transition treatments, and allow patients to sue doctors for 25 years after receiving gender transition-related healthcare. The bill was defeated on first reading.

On 13 February 2026, during the aftermath of the 2026 Tumbler Ridge shooting by a trans woman, Armstrong made several social media posts criticizing "transgender ideology" as "radicalizing youth, and unlocking violent impulses", as well as claiming that "[t]here is an epidemic of transgender violence spreading across the West". Armstrong would later then introduce the Gender Ideology and Child Protection Act, deeming affirming trans youth to be child abuse, also defeated at first reading.

On 26 February 2026, Armstrong tabled the Human Rights Code Repeal Act, which would abolish the British Columbia Human Rights Tribunal and repeal the province's Human Rights Code. The bill followed a tribunal decision ordering Barry Neufeld to pay $750,000 in damages to the BC Teachers' Federation and Chilliwack Teachers' Association over his comments about LGBTQ+ people. The bill failed at first reading by a vote of 50 to 37, with the Conservative caucus voting in support.

=== Indigenous sovereignty ===
In May 2025, following her departure from the Conservative caucus, Armstrong issued a joint statement with independent MLA Dallas Brodie characterizing the concept of 'Indigenous sovereignty' as a "threat" to British Columbia. The statement argued that the province "cannot accommodate more than 200 sovereignties within its borders" and claimed that "unilateral assertions of sovereignty" were "deepening racial conflict."

Armstrong and Brodie also referenced historical colonial policies, expressing a desire to follow the example of British Columbia's entry into Confederation in 1871, when the government did not recognize the concept of Aboriginal title. The statement drew condemnation from the Penticton Indian Band, who demanded the resignation of both MLAs. The Band cited Section 35 of the Constitution Act, 1982, emphasizing that 'Indigenous sovereignty' is protected by Canadian and international law.

== Controversies ==
In April 2026, Armstrong received strong criticism for referencing, in critique of 'Indigenous' concepts, the Nazi concept of "blood and soil" in the British Columbia Legislature. During debate over the K’ómoks Treaty Act, she claimed that the treaty promotes the United Nations Declaration on the Rights of Indigenous Peoples' "blood and soil theory," that descendants of hunters have "inherent rights" based on claimed "inextricable links to the land." The concept was used extensively by Nazi Germany to promote the idea that "Aryan" people, descending from documented German tribal history in Eastern Europe predating Slavic settlement and the Roman Empire, had an "ancestral" right to the lands that the country sought to conquer. In a statement posted to social media, British Columbia Premier David Eby said "no one should ever be allowed to stand in the BC Legislature to use Nazi rhetoric to argue a point" and called for all parties to denounce her "abhorrent comment." Similarly, Nico Slobinsky, vice president of the Centre for Israel and Jewish Affairs, posted to social media, saying Armstrong's language "minimize[s] the memories of victims and lived experiences of survivors of the Holocaust and Nazi ideology." Despite the calls to retract her comments, Armstrong instead posted a video of her comments to social media.

== Electoral history ==
2024 British Columbia general election: Kelowna-Lake Country-Coldstream
Party	Candidate	Votes	%	±%	Expenditures
Conservative	Tara Armstrong	14,303	53.92	+50.0	$29,208.25
New Democratic	Anna Warwick Sears	9,350	35.25	+4.6	$25,889.99
Independent	Kevin Kraft	1,724	6.50	–	$4,138.50
Green	Andrew Rose	1,151	4.34	-10.5	$0.00
Total valid votes/expense limit		26,528	99.88	–	$71,700.08
Total rejected ballots		32	0.12	–	
Turnout		26,560	58.25	–	
Registered voters		45,598			
Conservative notional gain from BC United		Swing		N/A (Note: Swing cannot be calculated as BC United did not run a candidate in this riding.)	
Source: Elections BC

== See also ==
- 43rd Parliament of British Columbia
