= Carson Binda =

Canadian politician

The Honourable Carson Binda MLA

Minister of State for Red Tape Reduction of British Columbia
- Incumbent
- Assumed office November 20, 2026
- Premier: Lorne Doerkson
- Preceded by: Coralee Oakes (2017)

Member of the British Columbia Legislative Assembly for Vancouver-Quilchena
- Incumbent
- Assumed office October 24, 2026
- Preceded by: Dallas Brodie

Personal details
- Party: BC Conservative
- Other political affiliations: Conservative (federal)

Carson Binda MLA is a Canadian politician who has served as a member of the Legislative Assembly of British Columbia representing the electoral district of Vancouver-Quilchena since 2026.

== Early career ==
Binda was previously the British Columbia director of the Canadian Taxpayers Federation, and also wrote several articles for Business in Vancouver, the Vancouver Sun, and the National Post; he also was a logistics officer in the Primary Reserve. Binda lived most of his childhood in Yemen, Kosovo, Nigeria, and Malta. He has also represented the CTF while speaking to the Legislative Assembly concerning the use of taxpayer money.

== Political career ==
In 2021, Binda ran unsuccessfully as the federal Conservative Party candidate in the riding of Vancouver Kingsway during the 2021 federal election, placing third behind the incumbent NDP MP Don Davies.

During the 2026 British Columbia provincial election, Binda ran in the electoral district of Vancouver-Quilchena. He defeated former Conservative MLA Dallas Brodie who was kicked out of caucus a year earlier and lead the OneBC Party during the election.

On 20 November, Binda was named as the Minister of State for Red Tape Reduction in the Doerkson ministry.

== Electoral history ==
=== Provincial ===
2026 British Columbia general election: Vancouver-Quilchena
** Preliminary results — Not yet official **
Party	Candidate	Votes	%	±%
Conservative	Carson Binda	12,017	54.42	
New Democratic	Callista Ryan	5,981	27.09	
Green	Douglas Courtemanche	2,065	9.35	
CentreBC	Petra Kuret	1,127	5.10	–
OneBC	Dallas Brodie	859	3.89	–
Total valid votes		22,049	99.86	
Total rejected ballots		31	0.14	
Turnout		22,080		
Registered voters				
Conservative hold		Swing		+7.95
Note: Incumbent MLA Dallas Brodie was elected as a Conservative in 2024, but was expelled from the caucus on March 7, 2025. On June 9, 2025, she founded and joined OneBC.
Source: Elections BC

=== Federal ===
2021 Canadian federal election: Vancouver Kingsway
Party	Candidate	Votes	%	±%	Expenditures
New Democratic	Don Davies	20,994	52.28	+3.19	$99,674.26
Liberal	Virginia Bremner	11,022	27.45	+4.36	$47,586.74
Conservative	Carson Binda	5,456	13.59	–6.35	$7,752.14
Green	Farrukh A. Chishtie	1,575	3.92	–2.14	$2,013.80
People's	Jeremy MacKenzie	868	2.16	+1.19	$247.30
Communist	Kimball Cariou	175	0.44	–0.23	none listed
Marxist–Leninist	Donna Petersen	68	0.17	–0.04	none listed
Total valid votes/expense limit		40,158	99.20	–	$108,601.94
Total rejected ballots		324	0.80	–0.20	
Turnout		40,482	53.93	–4.73	
Eligible voters		75,060			
New Democratic hold		Swing		–0.59	
Source: Elections Canada
