= Bonnie McKinnon =

Canadian businesswoman and politician

Assembly Member for Surrey-Cloverdale
- In office 1996–2001
- Preceded by: Ken Jones
- Succeeded by: Kevin Falcon

Bonnie McKinnon is a Canadian businesswoman and politician in British Columbia, Canada. She represented Surrey-Cloverdale in the Legislative Assembly of British Columbia from 1996 to 2001 as a Liberal and then Independent member.

For her initial provincial election in 1996, she recruited family friend (and future mayor) Dianne Watts as a campaign organizer which helped launch Watts into city council.

McKinnon left the Liberal party while in office due to disagreement with leader Gordon Campbell and dissatisfaction with support for women MLAs. She was defeated by Kevin Falcon when she ran for reelection in 2001 as an Independent.

Prior to provincial politics, McKinnon served as a member of Surrey City Council. She was president of the Cloverdale Skating Club and of the Surrey Board of Trade and a director for the Cloverdale Rodeo and Exhibition Association.
