= Kelowna-Lake Country-Coldstream =

Provincial electoral district in British Columbia, Canada

British Columbia electoral district
- Interactive map of riding boundaries

Provincial electoral district
- Legislature: Legislative Assembly of British Columbia
MLA
Pavneet Singh
Conservative
- District created: 2023
- First contested: 2024
- Last contested: 2026

Demographics
- Census division(s): Central Okanagan, North Okanagan
- Census subdivision(s): Coldstream, Duck Lake 7, Kelowna, Lake Country, Vernon

Kelowna-Lake Country-Coldstream is a provincial electoral district in British Columbia that has been represented in the Legislative Assembly since 2024.

Created under the 2021 British Columbia electoral redistribution, the riding was first contested in the 2024 British Columbia general election. It was created out of parts of Kelowna-Lake Country and Vernon-Monashee.

== Demographics ==
Population, 2021	58,671
Area (km^{2})	2,227
Pop. Density (people per km^{2})	26
Source: BC Electoral Boundaries Commission

== Geography ==
The district covers parts of the Regional District of Central Okanagan and the Regional District of North Okanagan on the east shore of Okanagan Lake. It includes inland portions of the city of Kelowna east of Highway 97 and north of Highway 33 (including the north half of the community of Rutland), the northernmost lakeside areas of Kelowna, the municipality of Lake Country and the municipality of Coldstream.

== Members of the Legislative Assembly ==
This riding has elected the following members of the Legislative Assembly:

Assembly	Years	Member	Party
Kelowna-Lake Country-Coldstream; Riding created from Kelowna-Lake Country and Vernon-Monashee
43rd	2024–2025	Tara Armstrong	Conservative
43rd	2025–2025	Tara Armstrong	Independent
43rd	2025–2025	Tara Armstrong	OneBC
43rd	2025–2026	Tara Armstrong	Independent
44th	2026–present	Pavneet Singh	Conservative

== Election results ==
2026 British Columbia general election
Party	Candidate	Votes	%	±%	Expenditures
Conservative	Pavneet Singh	10,565	47.5	-6.4	
New Democratic	Binny Boparai	7,255	32.6	-2.6	
OneBC	Alexandra Wright	2,532	11.4	–	
Green	Carter Mochinski	1,894	8.5	+4.2	
Total valid votes		22,246			
Total rejected ballots					
Turnout					
Registered voters					
Conservative hold		Swing			
Source: Elections BC

2024 British Columbia general election
Party	Candidate	Votes	%	±%	Expenditures
Conservative	Tara Armstrong	14,303	53.92	+50.0	$29,208.25
New Democratic	Anna Warwick Sears	9,350	35.25	+4.6	$25,889.99
Independent	Kevin Kraft	1,724	6.50	–	$4,138.50
Green	Andrew Rose	1,151	4.34	-10.5	$0.00
Total valid votes/expense limit		26,528	99.88	–	$71,700.08
Total rejected ballots		32	0.12	–	
Turnout		26,560	58.25	–	
Registered voters		45,598			
Conservative notional gain from BC United		Swing		N/A (Note: Swing cannot be calculated as BC United did not run a candidate in this riding.)	
Source: Elections BC

2020 provincial election redistributed results
Party	%
Liberal	48.7
New Democratic	30.6
Green	14.8
Conservative	3.9

== See also ==
- List of British Columbia provincial electoral districts
- Canadian provincial electoral districts
