= Kevin Falcon =

Canadian politician (born 1963)

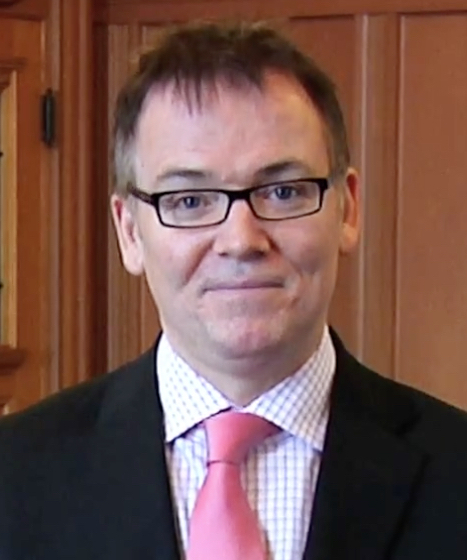
- Falcon in 2011

Leader of the Opposition of British Columbia
- In office May 16, 2022 – September 21, 2024
- Preceded by: Shirley Bond
- Succeeded by: John Rustad

Leader of BC United (Note: Known as the British Columbia Liberal Party until the party's name was changed to BC United on April 12, 2023)
- In office February 5, 2022 – October 27, 2026
- Preceded by: Shirley Bond (interim)
- Succeeded by: Office dissolved

12th Deputy Premier of British Columbia
- In office March 14, 2011 – September 5, 2012
- Premier: Christy Clark
- Preceded by: Colin Hansen
- Succeeded by: Rich Coleman
Ministerial positions
Minister of Finance of British Columbia
In office March 14, 2011 – September 5, 2012
| Premier | Christy Clark |
| Preceded by | Colin Hansen |
| Succeeded by | Mike de Jong |
Minister of Health Services of British Columbia
In office June 10, 2009 – November 30, 2010
| Premier | Gordon Campbell |
| Preceded by | George Abbott |
| Succeeded by | Colin Hansen |
Minister of Transportation and Infrastructure of British Columbia
In office January 26, 2004 – June 10, 2009
| Premier | Gordon Campbell |
| Preceded by | Judith Reid |
| Succeeded by | Shirley Bond |
Minister of State for Deregulation of British Columbia
In office June 5, 2001 – January 26, 2004
| Premier | Gordon Campbell |
| Succeeded by | Rick Thorpe |

Member of the Legislative Assembly of British Columbia
- In office April 30, 2022 – October 19, 2024
- Preceded by: Andrew Wilkinson
- Succeeded by: Dallas Brodie
- Constituency: Vancouver-Quilchena
- In office May 16, 2001 – April 16, 2013
- Preceded by: Bonnie McKinnon
- Succeeded by: Stephanie Cadieux
- Constituency: Surrey-Cloverdale

Personal details
- Born: 1963 (age 62–63) West Vancouver, British Columbia, Canada
- Party: BC United

Kevin Falcon (born 1963) is a Canadian politician who served as the leader of the Opposition of British Columbia from 2022 to 2024 and as leader of the Liberal Party (later BC United) from 2022 to 2026. He served as a member of the Legislative Assembly (MLA) representing the electoral districts of Surrey-Cloverdale from 2001 to 2013 and Vancouver-Quilchena from 2022 to 2024. In government, he served as the 12th deputy premier and as the minister of finance from 2011 to 2012.

== Early life and career ==
Born in North Vancouver, British Columbia, Falcon attended Vancouver College, an all-boys Catholic preparatory high school, where he said he got free tuition due to his family's low income.

Falcon studied political science at Simon Fraser University (SFU), where he received a Bachelor of Arts degree. He was a member of the Young Socreds on campus while future Premier Christy Clark was also at SFU.

After graduation, Falcon was part of a movement that saw Doug McCallum upset incumbent mayor Bob Bose of the NDP-affiliated Surrey Civic Electors party in 1996, and the election to council of future mayor Dianne Watts.

Falcon set up a communications consultancy, Access Group, in 1998. He was a lead organizer of the "Total Recall" effort to recall a number of BC New Democratic Party MLAs in 1999.

== Political career (2001–2013) ==
Falcon became the BC Liberal nominee for Surrey-Cloverdale in 1999, defeating incumbent Bonnie McKinnon. He was elected in the 2001 British Columbia general election, and re-elected in the 2005, and 2009 elections.

=== Campbell ministry ===
Following the election of a Liberal majority in 2001, Falcon joined Gordon Campbell's cabinet. He was appointed to the newly created position of Minister of State for Deregulation, where he cut "red tape" (i.e., regulations that create costs or frustration for consumers and producers while providing little benefit to the public).

Falcon's reforms are credited with moving B.C. to among the best-performing provinces: economic growth increased from 1.9% below the provincial average between 1994 and 2001 to 1.21% above the average between 2002 and 2006.

In 2004, Falcon was elevated to Minister of Transportation, following the resignation of the then minister, Judith Reid after the BC Legislature raids linked to the sale of BC Rail ("Railgate"). In that role, he changed TransLink's governance structure to introduce a government-appointed board of professionals (engineers, accountants, etc.) to run day-to-day operations, and a council of mayors to deal with long term planning. He also introduced the Gateway Program, a $3 billion regional transportation strategy for Metro Vancouver that launched the construction of the new Port Mann Bridge.

In June 2009, Falcon was appointed as Minister of Health.

=== Campaign for Liberal leadership ===
On November 3, 2010, Premier Gordon Campbell announced that he would step down as Premier of British Columbia once his successor was chosen. On November 30, 2010, Falcon launched his campaign for the 2011 BC Liberal Party leadership, with policy stances that included lowering the harmonized sales tax, increasing trade with Asia, providing childcare options, and increasing the minimum wage. At that time, Falcon's social media traffic was the highest of declared candidates. On February 26, 2011, Falcon narrowly lost his bid to become the Liberal leader, and the province's Premier, to Christy Clark by a margin of 52% - 48% in the third round of voting by party members.

=== Clark ministry ===
The new premier, Christy Clark, included Falcon in her cabinet, appointing him Minister of Finance and Deputy Premier.

In August 2012, expecting the birth of his second daughter Rose, Falcon indicated he would not run in the 2013 election.

== Break from politics (2013–2021) ==
After leaving the legislature, Falcon moved to North Vancouver and joined Vancouver-based Anthem Capital as their Executive Vice President. He also took on volunteer roles with non-profit organizations including the Canuck Place Foundation, Lions Gate Hospital Foundation and the Streetohome Foundation. In February 2014, he was also named as an honorary director of the Surrey Board of Trade.

He endorsed Maxime Bernier in the 2017 Conservative Leadership Race. Falcon worked with a real estate developer friend to raise $130,000 for Bernier in a single night - a record for the campaign at the time.

== Return to politics (2021–2026) ==
=== 2022 BC Liberal leadership race ===
BC Liberal Leader Andrew Wilkinson announced his resignation on 26 October 2020, and officially resigned on 17 February 2021, triggering a year-long BC Liberal leadership race. Falcon officially joined the race a month later. In his launch speech, Falcon committed to renaming the BC Liberal Party in consultation with members to better reflect the party's values.

On October 31, 2021, Diamond Isinger, campaign manager for fellow leadership candidate Michael Lee, shared a statement about an "incident of sexual & personal harassment" with a Falcon campaign staffer. Isinger said she went public with her allegations "due to the lack of action taken" after addressing her concerns privately with the Falcon campaign. Falcon fired the staffer the day after Isinger's statement.

Falcon won the leadership on February 5, 2022, crossing the 50% threshold required to win on the fifth ballot. Following Falcon's win, Andrew Wilkinson formally resigned as an MLA to free up his seat in Vancouver-Quilchena for Falcon to run. A by-election for the riding was called on April 2, 2022. Falcon won the by-election, being elected MLA for the riding.

=== Leader of the BC Liberals ===
In August 2022, Liberal MLA John Rustad drew criticism for suggesting that CO_{2} emissions were not contributing to climate change. Falcon fired Rustad from the BC Liberal Caucus, adding: "John Rustad does not speak on behalf of caucus on this issue." Rustad later joined the BC Conservatives and was acclaimed as their new leader in March 2023.

=== Leader of BC United (2023-2026) ===
Falcon unveiled the new BC United name and branding on April 12, 2023.

The renamed party was unable to prevent a surge in support for the BC Conservative Party and fell to a distant third place in public opinion polls. Four BC United MLAs crossed the floor to join the Conservatives from September 2023 to July 2024. On August 28, 2024, Falcon announced that BC United was suspending its campaign and withdrawing its candidates from the 2024 British Columbia general election in order to endorse the Conservatives. Falcon also announced he would not be running in the election. Falcon remained party leader following the election. In February 2025, former BC United MLA Karin Kirkpatrick called for him to resign saying that his continued presence was preventing the party from rebuilding and raising funds to pay its debts.

BC United did not field candidates in the 2026 British Columbia general election. As it was second election in succession that the party stood no candidates it was de-registered by Elections BC under section 168 of the Election Act. Following this, Falcon submitted his resignation at leader of the party.

== Personal life ==
Falcon lives in North Vancouver with his wife Jessica and daughters Josephine and Rose. His sister-in-law is Caroline Elliott, a politician and political commentator.

== Electoral history ==
British Columbia provincial by-election, April 30, 2022: Vancouver-Quilchena Resignation of Andrew Wilkinson
| Party | Candidate | Votes | % | ±% | Expenditures |
|---|---|---|---|---|---|
| Liberal | Kevin Falcon | 6,200 | 58.61 | +2.57 | $117,930.56 |
| New Democratic | Jeanette Ashe | 2,590 | 24.48 | –4.08 | $75,850.61 |
| Green | Wendy Hayko | 1,025 | 9.69 | –5.71 | $32,855.66 |
| Conservative | Dallas Brodie | 698 | 6.60 | – | $33,166.75 |
| Libertarian | Sandra Filosof-Schipper | 66 | 0.62 | – | $636.31 |
| Total valid votes | | 10,579 | 99.95 | – | |
| Total rejected ballots | | 5 | 0.05 | –0.46 | |
| Turnout | | 10,584 | 27.56 | –27.56 | |
| Registered voters | | 38,399 | | | |
| Liberal hold | | Swing | | +3.33 | |
Source: Elections BC

2009 British Columbia general election: Surrey-Cloverdale
| Party | Candidate | Votes | % | ±% |
|---|---|---|---|---|
| Liberal | Kevin Falcon | 13,815 | 62.70 | 1.06 |
| New Democratic | Deborah Payment | 6,567 | 29.81 | +1.14 |
| Green | Kevin Purton | 1,651 | 7.49 | −1.06 |
| Total valid votes | | 22,033 | 99.44 | |
| Total rejected ballots | | 125 | 0.56 | -0.01 |
| Turnout | | 22,158 | 55.03 | -10.47 |
| Registered voters | | 40,268 | | |
Source: Elections BC
| Liberal hold | | Swing | | -0.04 |

2005 British Columbia general election: Surrey-Cloverdale
| Party | Candidate | Votes | % | ±% |
|---|---|---|---|---|
| Liberal | Kevin Falcon | 16,429 | 61.64 | −2.08 |
| New Democratic | Ted Allen | 7,640 | 28.66 | +17.84 |
| Green | Pierre Rovtar | 2,280 | 8.55 | −1.77 |
| Democratic Reform | Joseph Vollhoffer | 305 | 1.14 | – |
| Total valid votes | | 26,654 | 99.43 | |
| Total rejected ballots | | 153 | 0.57 | +0.19 |
| Turnout | | 26,807 | 65.49 | -9.96 |
| Registered voters | | 40,932 | | |
Source: Elections BC
| Liberal hold | | Swing | | -9.96 |

2001 British Columbia general election: Surrey-Cloverdale
| Party | Candidate | Votes | % | ±% | Expenditures |
|---|---|---|---|---|---|
| Liberal | Kevin Falcon | 13,739 | 63.72 | +15.45 | $47,532 |
| New Democratic | Steve Oakley | 2,333 | 10.82 | -19.00 | $11,172 |
| Green | Steve Chitty | 2,227 | 10.33 | +9.09 | $463 |
| Independent | Bonnie McKinnon | 1,669 | 7.74 | n/a | $6,828 |
| Unity | George Hoytema | 1,112 | 5.16 | +2.76 | $4,774 |
| Marijuana | Jason Elliott | 481 | 2.23 | n/a | $394 |
| Total valid votes | | 21,561 | 99.62 | | |
| Total rejected ballots | | 82 | 0.38 | -0.34 | |
| Turnout | | 21,643 | 75.45 | +0.70 | |
| Registered voters | | 28,684 | | | |
Source: Elections BC
| Liberal hold | | Swing | | +17.22 | |

^ Unity totals compared to FCP

== See also ==
- British Columbia United
- 2022 British Columbia Liberal Party leadership election
