= Art Cowie =

Canadian politician (1934–2009)

Member of the Legislative Assembly of British Columbia for Vancouver-Quilchena
- In office 1991–1993
- Succeeded by: Gordon Campbell

Personal details
- Born: September 17, 1934 Halifax, Nova Scotia
- Died: November 21, 2009 (aged 75) British Columbia, Canada
- Party: The Electors' Action Movement (municipal); BC Liberal Party

Art Cowie (September 17, 1934 – November 21, 2009) was an urban planner, landscape architect and political figure in British Columbia. He represented Vancouver-Quilchena in the Legislative Assembly of British Columbia from 1991 to 1993 as a Liberal. He was born in 1934 in Halifax, Nova Scotia. He also served on Vancouver City Council from 1974 to 1976 as a member of The Electors' Action Movement.

Cowie was educated at the University of New Brunswick, at University College London and at the University of British Columbia. He served on the Vancouver Park Board and then on Vancouver city council. Cowie resigned his seat in the provincial assembly in 1993 to allow Gordon Campbell to be elected to the assembly. He was president of Sungold Entertainment Corporation and of Eikos Planning Incorporated. In 2003, he was named a director for the North Fraser Port Authority. Cowie lobbied for the introduction of fee simple row housing in Vancouver and built a demonstration project. He died from respiratory failure at the age of 75.
