= Vancouver-Quilchena =

Provincial electoral district in British Columbia, Canada

British Columbia electoral district
- Interactive map of riding boundaries

Provincial electoral district
- Legislature: Legislative Assembly of British Columbia
MLA
Carson Binda
Conservative
- First contested: 1991
- Last contested: 2026

Demographics
- Population (2021): 56,957
- Area (km²): 24
- Pop. density (per km²): 2,373.2
- Census division: Metro Vancouver
- Census subdivision(s): Vancouver, Musqueam 2

Vancouver-Quilchena is a provincial electoral district in British Columbia that has been represented in the Legislative Assembly of British Columbia since 1991.

Since its creation, the riding has historically leaned toward centre-right political parties and has consistently elected right-wing candidates. The district has been represented by several high-profile figures in British Columbia politics, including former premier Gordon Campbell and former deputy premier Colin Hansen.

== Demographics ==
Population, 2021	56,957
Area (km^{2})	24
Pop. Density (people per km^{2})	2,373
Source: BC Electoral Boundaries Commission

== Geography ==
Vancouver-Quilchena is situated on Vancouver's west side and includes the neighbourhoods of Quilchena, Kerrisdale, Arbutus Ridge, and parts of Shaughnessy. The riding is largely residential and affluent, with high property values and a stable population. According to the 2006 census, this riding is the second-wealthiest in British Columbia, with an average annual family income of $91,822 in 2013, behind West Vancouver-Capilano.

== Members of the Legislative Assembly ==
This riding has elected the following members of the Legislative Assembly:

Assembly	Years	Member	Party
Vancouver-Quilchena; Riding created from Vancouver-Point Grey and Vancouver-Little Mountain
35th	1991–1993	Art Cowie	Liberal
35th	1993–1996	Gordon Campbell	Liberal
36th	1996–2001	Colin Hansen	Liberal
37th	2001–2005	Colin Hansen	Liberal
38th	2005–2009	Colin Hansen	Liberal
39th	2009–2013	Colin Hansen	Liberal
40th	2013–2017	Andrew Wilkinson	Liberal
41st	2017–2020	Andrew Wilkinson	Liberal
42nd	2020–2022	Andrew Wilkinson	Liberal
42nd	2022–2023	Kevin Falcon	Liberal
42nd	2023–2024	Kevin Falcon	BC United
43rd	2024–2025	Dallas Brodie	Conservative
43rd	2025–2025	Dallas Brodie	Independent
43rd	2025–2025	Dallas Brodie	OneBC
43rd	2025–2025	Dallas Brodie	Independent
43rd	2025–2026	Dallas Brodie	OneBC
44th	2026–present	Carson Binda	Conservative

== Election results ==
2026 British Columbia general election
The 2026 general election will be held on October 24.
Party	Candidate	Votes	%	±%	Expenditures
Conservative	Carson Binda				
New Democratic	Callista Ryan				
Green	Douglas Courtemanche				
OneBC	Dallas Brodie			–	
CentreBC	Petra Kuret			–	
Total valid votes					
Total rejected ballots					
Turnout					
Registered voters					
Note: Incumbent MLA Dallas Brodie was elected as a Conservative in 2024, but was expelled from the caucus on March 7, 2025. On June 9, 2025, she founded and joined OneBC.
Source: Elections BC

2024 British Columbia general election
Party	Candidate	Votes	%	±%	Expenditures
Conservative	Dallas Brodie	11,464	51.58	–	
New Democratic	Callista Ryan	8,649	38.91	+10.35	
Green	Michael Barkusky	1,729	7.78	−7.62	
Independent	Caroline Ying-Mei Wang	385	1.73	–	
Total valid votes		22,227	99.86	–	
Total rejected ballots		32	0.14		
Turnout		22,259			
Registered voters					
Conservative notional gain from BC United		Swing		–	
Source: Elections BC

2020 provincial election redistributed results
Party	%
Liberal	56.8
New Democratic	28.5
Green	14.6
Libertarian	0.1

British Columbia provincial by-election, April 30, 2022 Resignation of Andrew Wilkinson
Party	Candidate	Votes	%	±%	Expenditures
Liberal	Kevin Falcon	6,200	58.61	+2.57	$117,930.56
New Democratic	Jeanette Ashe	2,590	24.48	–4.08	$75,850.61
Green	Wendy Hayko	1,025	9.69	–5.71	$32,855.66
Conservative	Dallas Brodie	698	6.60	–	$33,166.75
Libertarian	Sandra Filosof-Schipper	66	0.62	–	$636.31
Total valid votes		10,579	99.95	–	
Total rejected ballots		5	0.05	–0.46	
Turnout		10,584	27.56	–27.56	
Registered voters		38,399			
Liberal hold		Swing		+3.33	
Source: Elections BC

2020 British Columbia general election
Party	Candidate	Votes	%	±%	Expenditures
Liberal	Andrew Wilkinson	12,157	56.04	+0.08	$26,851.98
New Democratic	Heather McQuillan	6,197	28.56	+0.53	$3,729.58
Green	Michael Barkusky	3,341	15.40	+0.58	$659.92
Total valid votes		21,695	99.49	–	
Total rejected ballots		112	0.51	+0.01	
Turnout		21,807	56.52	–5.88	
Registered voters		38,584			
Liberal hold		Swing		–0.23	
Source: Elections BC

2017 British Columbia general election
Party	Candidate	Votes	%	±%	Expenditures
Liberal	Andrew Wilkinson	12,464	55.96	−8.36	$64,283
New Democratic	Madeline Lalonde	6,244	28.03	+2.72	$9,017
Green	Michael Barkusky	3,301	14.82	+7.42	$4,481
Libertarian	William Morrison	265	1.19	–	$346
Total valid votes		22,274	99.50	–	
Total rejected ballots		112	0.50	+0.02	
Turnout		22,386	62.39	+2.95	
Registered voters		35,878			
Liberal hold		Swing		−5.54	
Source: Elections BC

2013 British Columbia general election
Party	Candidate	Votes	%	±%	Expenditures
Liberal	Andrew Wilkinson	14,496	64.32	−5.91	$99,877
New Democratic	Nicholas Scapillati	5,705	25.31	+4.57	$30,366
Green	Damian Kettlewell	1,667	7.40	−1.64	$2,267
No Affiliation	Bill Clarke	671	2.98	–	$14,738
Total valid votes		22,539	99.52	–	
Total rejected ballots		108	0.48	−0.09	
Turnout		22,647	59.45	+1.78	
Registered voters		38,095			
Liberal hold		Swing		-5.24	
Source: Elections BC

2009 British Columbia general election
Party	Candidate	Votes	%	±%	Expenditures
Liberal	Colin Hansen	15,731	70.22	+3.07	$109,703
New Democratic	James Young	4,646	20.74	−0.28	$12,514
Green	Laura-Leah Shaw	2,024	9.04	−1.36	$1,837
Total valid votes		22,401	99.44		
Total rejected ballots		127	0.56	+0.04	
Turnout		22,528	57.67	−3.98	
Registered Voters		39,067			
Liberal hold		Swing		+1.67	

2005 British Columbia general election
Party	Candidate	Votes	%	±%	Expenditures
Liberal	Colin Hansen	16,394	67.16	−6.70	$107,414
New Democratic	Jarrah Hodge	5,131	21.02	+11.50	$13,103
Green	Lorinda Earl	2,538	10.40	−3.99	$2,633
Marijuana	Rhiannon Rose	175	0.72	−0.82	$100
Libertarian	Katrina Chowne	174	0.71		$100
Total valid votes		24,412	99.48		
Total rejected ballots		128	0.52	+0.10	
Turnout		24,540	61.64	−11.80	
Registered Voters		39,811			
Liberal hold		Swing		−9.10	

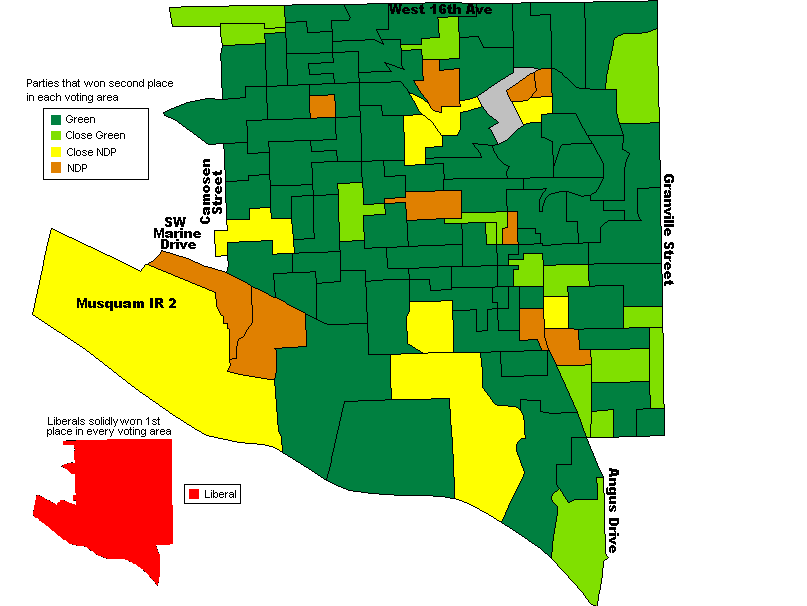
Popular vote by voting area in the 2001 election

2001 British Columbia general election
Party	Candidate	Votes	%	±%	Expenditures
Liberal	Colin Hansen	16,829	73.86	+5.18	$34,886
Green	Judy Johnstone	3,277	14.38	+11.61	$360
New Democratic	Gareth Charles Richmond	2,168	9.52	−12.52	$6,725
Marijuana	Katrina Chowne	351	1.54		$394
Independent	Mike Sharp	160	0.70		
Total valid votes		22,785	99.58		
Total rejected ballots		96	0.42	−0.06	
Turnout		22,881	73.44	−2.27	
Registered Voters		31,155			
Liberal hold		Swing		−3.21	

1996 British Columbia general election
Party	Candidate	Votes	%	±%	Expenditures
Liberal	Colin Hansen	15,509	68.68	+19.14	$36,863
New Democratic	Roger Boshier	4,977	22.04	−4.84	$13,802
Progressive Democrat	Richard Chave Sanderson	827	3.66	–	$300
Green	Valerie Jerome	627	2.78	+1.46	$459
Reform	Jay Davison	495	2.19	–	$975
Social Credit	Lorraine Hinton	91	0.40	−21.87	$2,142
Natural Law	Alan Mackenzie Brooke	57	0.25	$134	
Total valid votes		22,583	99.52		
Total rejected ballots		109	0.48	−0.85	
Turnout		22,692	75.71	−4.69	
Registered Voters		29,973			
Liberal hold		Swing		+11.99	

British Columbia provincial by-election, February 17, 1994 Resignation of Art Cowie
Party	Candidate	Votes	%	Expenditures
Liberal	Gordon Campbell	7,396	67.77	$44006.60
Social Credit	Sonja Weissenbacher	1,536	14.07	$17445.45
New Democratic	Fiona Wain	1,346	12.33	$10004.08
Green	Stuart Parker	395	3.62	$4766.09
Libertarian	Walter Boytinck	90	0.83	$400
Family Coalition	Darren Lowe	89	0.82	$668.13
Gnu Democratic Rhino Reform	Ronald McDonald	61	0.56	$0
Total valid votes		10,913	99.36	
Total rejected ballots		70	0.64	
Turnout		10,983	36.83	
Registered Voters		29,820		
Liberal hold		Swing		
Source: Elections BC

1991 British Columbia general election
Party	Candidate	Votes	%	Expenditures
Liberal	Art Cowie	11,373	49.53	$56,984
New Democratic	Stuart P. Hertzog	6,172	26.88	$14,576
Social Credit	Doug Mowat	5,113	22.27	
Green	Valerie E. Parker	302	1.32	$809
Total valid votes		22,960	98.67	
Total rejected ballots		309	1.33	
Turnout		23,269	80.40	
Registered Voters		28,941		
Source: Elections BC

== See also ==
- List of British Columbia provincial electoral districts
- Canadian provincial electoral districts
