= Shirley Bond =

Canadian politician

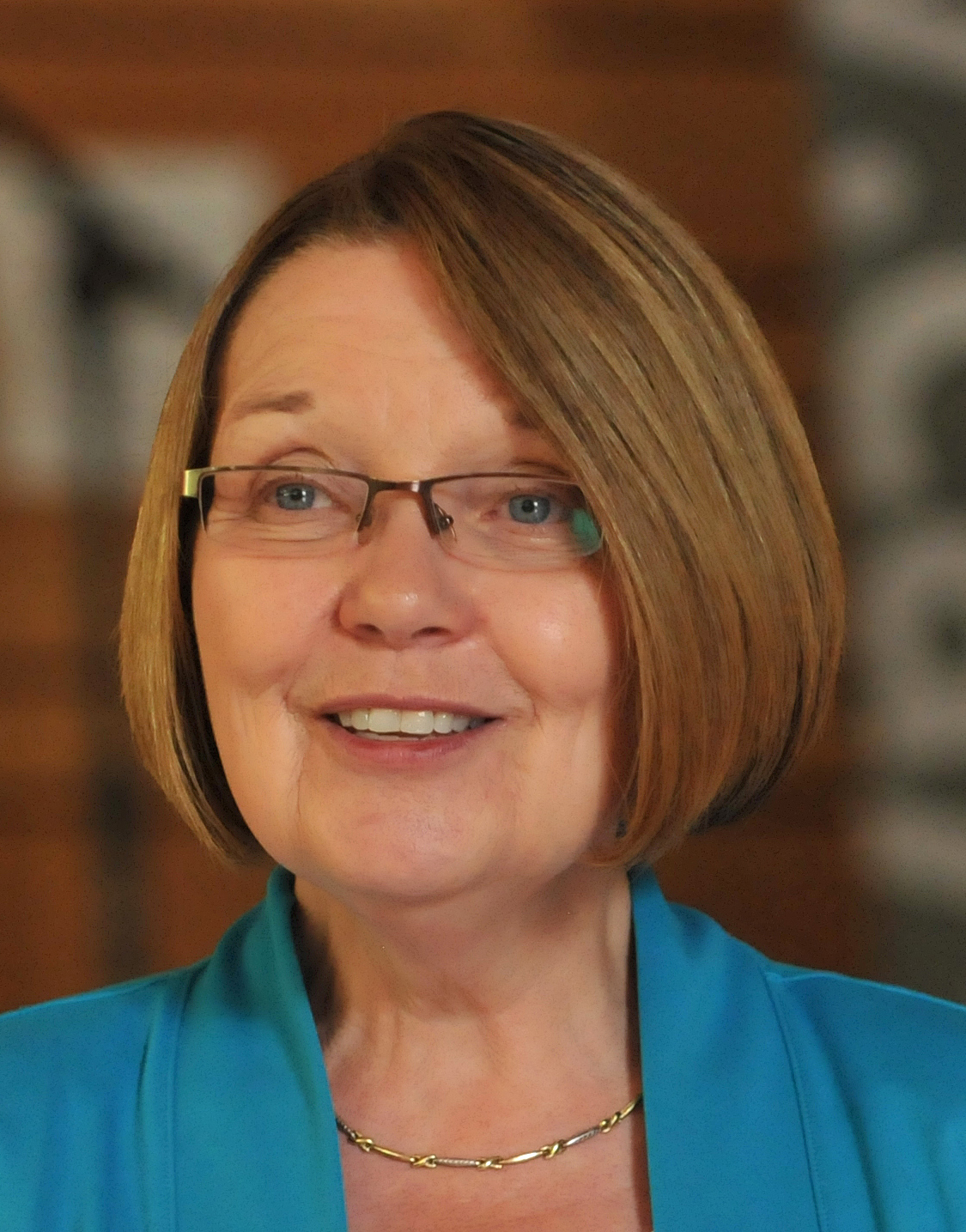
- Bond in 2014

Leader of the Opposition of British Columbia
- In office November 23, 2020 – May 16, 2022
- Preceded by: Andrew Wilkinson
- Succeeded by: Kevin Falcon

Leader of the Liberal Party of British Columbia
- Interim; November 23, 2020 – February 5, 2022
- Preceded by: Andrew Wilkinson
- Succeeded by: Kevin Falcon

Attorney General of British Columbia
- In office August 18, 2011 – June 10, 2013
- Premier: Christy Clark
- Preceded by: Barry Penner
- Succeeded by: Suzanne Anton

Minister of Public Safety and Solicitor General
- In office March 14, 2011 – February 8, 2012
- Premier: Christy Clark
- Preceded by: Rich Coleman
- Succeeded by: Mike Morris

Minister of Transportation and Infrastructure of British Columbia
- In office June 10, 2009 – March 14, 2011
- Premier: Gordon Campbell
- Preceded by: Kevin Falcon
- Succeeded by: Blair Lekstrom

10th Deputy Premier of British Columbia
- In office December 15, 2004 – June 10, 2009
- Premier: Gordon Campbell
- Preceded by: Christy Clark
- Succeeded by: Colin Hansen

Minister of Education of British Columbia
- In office June 16, 2005 – June 10, 2009
- Premier: Gordon Campbell
- Preceded by: Tom Christensen
- Succeeded by: Margaret MacDiarmid

Minister of Health Services of British Columbia
- In office December 15, 2004 – June 16, 2005
- Premier: Gordon Campbell
- Preceded by: Colin Hansen
- Succeeded by: George Abbott

Minister of Advanced Education of British Columbia
- In office June 5, 2001 – December 15, 2004
- Premier: Gordon Campbell
- Preceded by: Cathy McGregor
- Succeeded by: Ida Chong

Member of the British Columbia Legislative Assembly for Prince George-Valemount Prince George-Mount Robson (2001–2009)
- In office May 16, 2001 – September 21, 2024
- Preceded by: Lois Boone
- Succeeded by: Rosalyn Bird

Personal details
- Born: 1956 or 1957 (age 69–70) Prince George, British Columbia, Canada
- Party: BC United
- Occupation: Minister of Jobs, Tourism and Skills Training for British Columbia

Shirley Bond (born 1956 or 1957) is a Canadian politician who served as the interim leader of the BC Liberal Party and leader of the Opposition in British Columbia from 2020 to 2022. She served as a member of the Legislative Assembly (MLA), representing the electoral districts of Prince George-Mount Robson and later Prince George-Valemount, from 2001 to 2024. During her time in the legislature, she served in cabinet under both premiers Gordon Campbell and Christy Clark from 2001 to 2013.

== Early life and education ==
Prior to provincial politics, Bond served three terms on the Prince George school board. Bond attended the University of Northern British Columbia but did not attain her bachelor's degree. She has an arts and sciences diploma from the College of New Caledonia.

== Political career ==
Bond was appointed Minister of Jobs, Tourism and Skills Training and Minister responsible for Labour on June 10, 2013 serving in that capacity until the Liberal government was unseated in a non-confidence vote in 2017. As of May 1, 2024, Bond served as the Shadow Minister for Health, Senior Services & Long Term Care.

Bond also served as vice-chair of the Treasury Board, chaired the Cabinet Committee on New Relationship Coordination, and sat as a member of the cabinet climate action committee.

On August 30, 2024, Bond announced her retirement from politics. In the 2024 general election her seat was won by BC Conservative candidate Rosalyn Bird.

== Personal life ==
Bond lives in Prince George with her twin adult children and their families, including grandsons Caleb and Cooper. Her husband Bill, to whom she was married for 41 years, died in 2020.

== Electoral history ==
2020 British Columbia general election: Prince George-Valemount
| Party | Candidate | Votes | % | ±% | Expenditures |
|---|---|---|---|---|---|
| Liberal | Shirley Bond | 9,703 | 55.62 | −2.58 | $29,563.67 |
| New Democratic | Laura Parent | 4,717 | 27.04 | −2.52 | $6,549.23 |
| Green | MacKenzie Kerr | 2,597 | 14.89 | +2.65 | $5,375.30 |
| Libertarian | Sean Robson | 428 | 2.45 | – | $46.95 |
| Total valid votes | | 17,445 | 100.00 | – | |
| Total rejected ballots | | 110 | 0.63 | –0.16 | |
| Turnout | | 17,555 | 47.42 | –9.33 | |
| Registered voters | | 37,020 | | | |
| Liberal hold | | Swing | | –0.03 | |
Source: Elections BC

2017 British Columbia general election: Prince George-Valemount
| Party | Candidate | Votes | % | ±% | Expenditures |
|---|---|---|---|---|---|
| Liberal | Shirley Bond | 11,209 | 58.20 | +1.25 | $47,005 |
| New Democratic | Natalie Fletcher | 5,694 | 29.56 | −6.33 | $36,872 |
| Green | Nan Kendy | 2,356 | 12.24 | – | $2,925 |
| Total valid votes | | 19,259 | 100.00 | – | |
| Total rejected ballots | | 154 | 0.79 | −0.28 | |
| Turnout | | 19,413 | 56.75 | +0.19 | |
Source: Elections BC

2013 British Columbia general election: Prince George-Valemount
| Party | Candidate | Votes | % | ±% | Expenditures |
|---|---|---|---|---|---|
| Liberal | Shirley Bond | 11,291 | 56.95 | +6.34 | $168,786 |
| New Democratic | Sherry Ogasawara | 7,116 | 35.89 | −1.69 | $103,073 |
| Conservative | Nathan Giede | 1,105 | 5.57 | +1.26 | $7,665 |
| Christian Heritage | Donald A. Roberts | 314 | 1.58 | - | $1,705 |
| Total valid votes | | 19,826 | 100.00 | | |
| Total rejected ballots | | 214 | 1.07 | | |
| Turnout | | 20,040 | 56.56 | | |
Source: Elections BC
