= OneBC (political party) =

Provincial political party in Canada

- Abbreviation: 1BC
- Leader: Dallas Brodie (interim)
- Founders: Dallas Brodie and Tara Armstrong
- Founded: June 9, 2025
- Split from: Conservative Party of British Columbia
- Headquarters: 262-5525 West Boulevard Vancouver, BC V6M 3W6
- Ideology: Right-wing populism; Social conservatism
- Political position: Right-wing to far-right
- Slogan: Excellence in British Columbia
- Seats in the Legislative Assembly: 0 / 93

Website
- 1bc.ca

OneBC (1BC) is a provincial political party in British Columbia, Canada. It was registered with Elections BC on June 9, 2025. Independent MLAs Dallas Brodie and Tara Armstrong launched the new party, with Brodie serving as interim leader and Armstrong as house leader. OneBC lost its official party status within the BC legislature in December 2025, following a dispute between Brodie and the rest of the party's board of directors, which led to Armstrong's departure from the party. It returned to official recognition on September 22, 2026, following Conservative MLA Brent Chapman joining the party.

== History ==
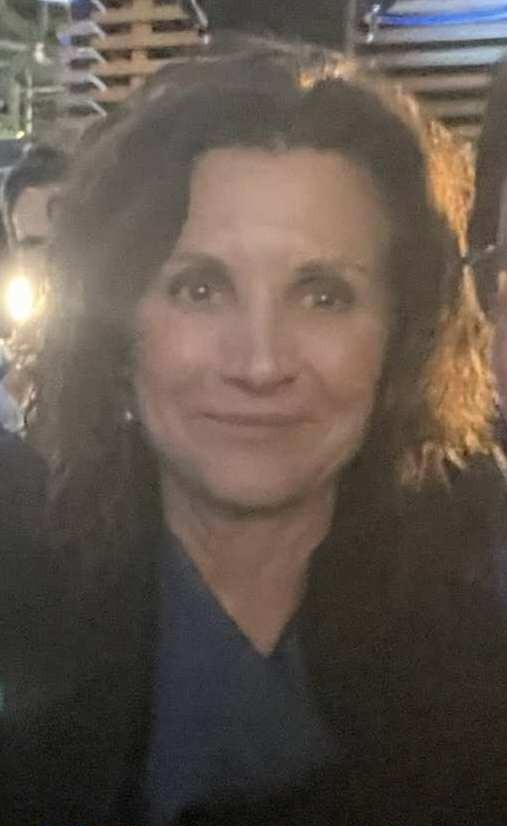
Dallas Brodie in 2024

Brodie and Armstrong were elected as Conservative MLAs in the 2024 election. On March 7, 2025, Brodie was removed from the Conservative caucus for comments she made about residential schools on a podcast. Later that day, Armstrong voluntarily left the caucus.

On June 12, 2025, the creation of OneBC was announced. The party held its first town hall meeting in Abbotsford on September 13, 2025. The party's next town hall meeting in Penticton was moved to a private art studio after their request to book the publicly-owned Penticton Trade and Convention Centre was rejected by the city.

On October 6, 2025, OneBC proposed a bill against gender-affirming healthcare, inspired by the model legislation of the US anti-trans organization Do No Harm. The bill would have prohibited doctors from providing puberty blockers and hormone therapy to minors, public funds from being used for gender transitions, and imposed the misgendering of students in schools. It would have also given parents and children 25 years after gender transition treatments to sue their doctors. The bill was defeated before its first reading, a rare occurrence, by a vote of 48 to 40. Later that same month, on October 23, the party proposed a bill that would have banned public institutions and employees from making land acknowledgements; the bill was defeated 88 to 5 in the first reading.

On December 2, 2025, OneBC premiered the documentary film Making a Killing: Reconciliation, Genocide and the Plunder of Canada, which was produced using public funds given to the party caucus. Brodie declined to publicly disclose the amount of money allocated to the film's production. The documentary has been criticized by NDP house leader Mike Farnworth for promoting residential school denialism.

On December 13, 2025, the majority of OneBC's board of directors voted to remove Brodie as interim leader and as a member of the party caucus. At the time, the board of directors included Brodie, Armstrong, party executive director Paul Ratchford, and party chief of staff Tim Thielmann. Earlier that day, Armstrong had stated that she had lost confidence in Brodie's leadership. OneBC consequently lost its official party status within the Legislative Assembly, as a party caucus needs at least two MLAs to be recognized and receive public funding and other benefits. After ten days of internal negotiations, Armstrong, Ratchford, and Thielmann resigned from the board of directors and voluntarily transferred control of the party to Brodie, reinstating her as interim leader.

On September 22, 2026, Conservative MLA for Surrey South, Brent Chapman crossed the floor from the Conservatives to OneBC, bringing the party to official status in the legislature.

The party ran 34 candiates in the 2026 British Columbia general election. None were elected, with Brodie herself finishing in last place in her riding.

== Policies ==
OneBC outlined a number of its policies in a press release on June 12, 2025. The party proposes cutting income taxes, allowing private healthcare, ending "mass immigration", defunding "the reconciliation industry" and banning teacher strikes. It has also called for an end to mail-in voting and early voting, as well as for all votes to be counted by hand. Michael MacKenzie, a professor of political science at Vancouver Island University, described OneBC as similar policy-wise to the federal People's Party of Canada (PPC), comparing their shared support for "big tax cuts, private health care and socially conservative policies". Kelowna columnist Wilbur Turner, writing for The Tyee, opined that Brodie's rhetoric is "the classic populist playbook".

== Party leaders ==
† denotes acting or interim leader

#	Leader	Tenure
†	Dallas Brodie	June 9, 2025 – December 13, 2025
	Vacant	December 13, 2025 – December 21, 2025
†	Dallas Brodie	December 21, 2025 – present

== OneBC MLAs ==
=== Former ===
MLA	District	Tenure
Dallas Brodie	Vancouver-Quilchena	June 9, 2025 – December 13, 2025; December 21, 2025 – October 24, 2026
Brent Chapman	Surrey South	September 22, 2026 – October 24, 2026
Tara Armstrong	Kelowna-Lake Country-Coldstream	June 9, 2025 – December 16, 2025

== Election results ==
Election	Leader	Candidates run	Seats won	Votes	Vote share	Seat change	Position	Result
2026	Dallas Brodie (interim)	34 / 93	0 / 93	27,054	1.50%	▼2	No seats	Conservative majority
