= Colin Hansen =

Canadian politician (born 1952)

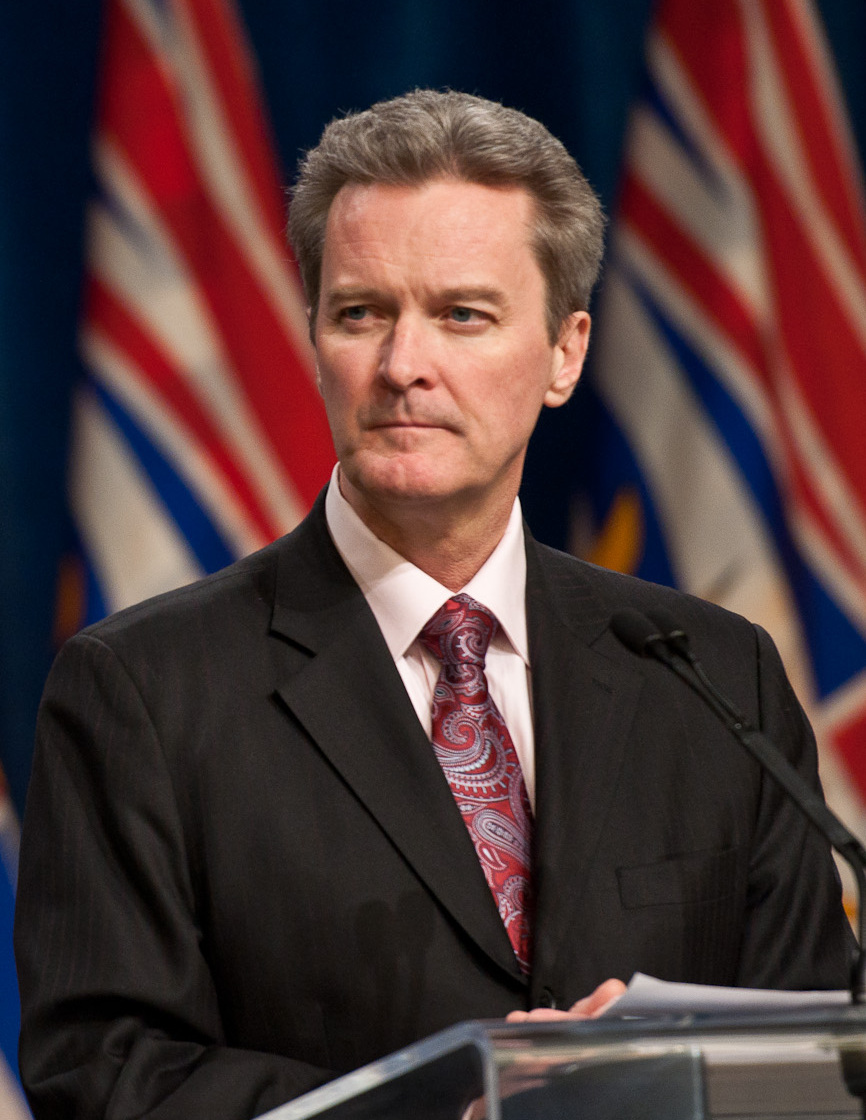

Member of the British Columbia Legislative Assembly for Vancouver-Quilchena
- In office May 28, 1996 – May 14, 2013
- Preceded by: Gordon Campbell
- Succeeded by: Andrew Wilkinson

11th Deputy Premier of British Columbia
- In office June 10, 2009 – March 10, 2011
- Premier: Gordon Campbell
- Preceded by: Shirley Bond
- Succeeded by: Kevin Falcon

Minister of Health Services of British Columbia
- In office June 5, 2001 – December 15, 2004
- Premier: Gordon Campbell
- Preceded by: Corky Evans
- Succeeded by: Shirley Bond

Minister of Finance
- In office December 15, 2004 – June 16, 2005
- Premier: Gordon Campbell
- Preceded by: Gary Collins
- Succeeded by: Carole Taylor
- In office June 23, 2008 – March 14, 2011
- Premier: Gordon Campbell
- Preceded by: Carole Taylor
- Succeeded by: Kevin Falcon

Minister responsible for Asia-Pacific Initiative
- In office June 16, 2005 – June 23, 2008
- Premier: Gordon Campbell
- Succeeded by: Ida Chong

Minister of Economic Development
- In office June 16, 2005 – June 23, 2008
- Premier: Gordon Campbell
- Preceded by: John Les
- Succeeded by: Ida Chong

Minister responsible for Olympics
- In office June 16, 2005 – June 10, 2009
- Premier: Gordon Campbell
- Succeeded by: Mary McNeil

Minister of Health Services
- In office November 30, 2010 – March 14, 2011
- Premier: Gordon Campbell
- Preceded by: Kevin Falcon
- Succeeded by: Michael de Jong

Personal details
- Born: 1952 Port Alberni, British Columbia
- Party: BC Liberal
- Occupation: businessman

Colin Hansen (born 1952) is a former politician in the Canadian province of British Columbia. He served as member of the Legislative Assembly of British Columbia from 1996 to 2013, representing the electoral district of Vancouver-Quilchena. As a member of the British Columbia Liberal Party caucus, he served in a variety of cabinet posts while that party was in power, including as the 11th Deputy Premier from June 2009 to March 2011, and twice as the province's Minister of Finance.

== Early life and education ==
Hansen was born and raised in the city of Port Alberni on Vancouver Island. He received his Bachelor of Arts degree in political science from the University of Victoria in 1975. He served as vice-president of finance and administration for the Asia Pacific Foundation of Canada, before founding Vancouver-based promotional products company Image Group with his wife Laura in 1988.

== Political career ==
Running for the British Columbia Liberal Party, Hansen was first elected to the Legislative Assembly of British Columbia in the 1996 provincial election to serve in the riding of Vancouver-Quilchena. He was re-elected member of the Legislative Assembly (MLA) for Vancouver-Quilchena in the 2001, 2005 and 2009 elections.

While the Liberals formed the official opposition between 1996 and 2001, Hansen served as critic for health, employment and investment, and labour. Following the Liberals' landslide win in 2001, Hansen was named to Premier Gordon Campbell's cabinet as Minister of Health Services in June 2001, before taking over as Minister of Finance in December 2004. He was then named Minister of Economic Development and Minister responsible for Asia-Pacific Initiative and the Olympics in June 2005, before resuming his post as Minister of Finance in 2008 in the wake of Carole Taylor's resignation.

With the Liberals forming government again in 2009, he retained his portfolio in finance, and in addition was named Deputy Premier. He added Minister Responsible for Small Business to his portfolio on October 25, 2010, before being additionally appointed as Minister of Health Services on November 30 that year.

On March 30, 2010, Hansen introduced legislation to bring in the harmonized sales tax (HST), replacing the previously separate 5% federal goods and services tax and 7% provincial sales tax. However, the proposal was met with strong opposition from most members of the public. Facing low approval ratings, Campbell announced his intention to resign as Premier and Liberal leader on November 3, 2010. Hansen threw his support behind Kevin Falcon in the ensuing Liberal leadership election, which was won by Christy Clark in 2011; she did not name Hansen to a cabinet post. In September 2012, Hansen announced he would not seek re-election as Vancouver-Quilchena MLA in the 2013 provincial election.

== Post-politics ==
After politics, Hansen served from 2014 to 2019 as the president of AdvantageBC, a non-government organization dedicated to promoting British Columbia as a place for international business. He continues to sit on the board of AdvantageBC following his term as president.

He serves on several not-for-profit boards including serving as Chair of the Fraser Basin Council, Honorary Governor of the Vancouver Foundation, Arthritis Research Canada, Jack Austin School of Asia Pacific Business Studies and the Canada-Japan Society.

Hansen has participated on a politics panel for CBC Vancouver's radio show CBC Early Edition.
