= Gordon Campbell (Canadian politician) =

Premier of British Columbia from 2001 to 2011

Gordon Campbell OC OBC
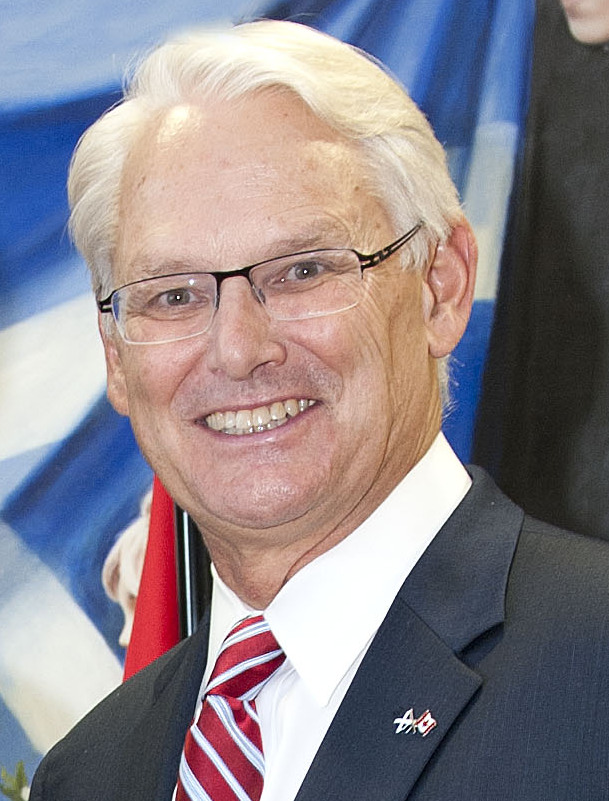
- Campbell in 2011

Canadian High Commissioner to the United Kingdom
- In office September 15, 2011 – July 19, 2016
- Prime Minister: Stephen Harper; Justin Trudeau
- Preceded by: James R. Wright
- Succeeded by: Janice Charette

34th Premier of British Columbia
- In office June 5, 2001 – March 14, 2011
- Monarch: Elizabeth II
- Lieutenant Governor: Garde Gardom; Iona Campagnolo; Steven Point
- Deputy: Christy Clark; Shirley Bond; Colin Hansen
- Preceded by: Ujjal Dosanjh
- Succeeded by: Christy Clark

Leader of the Opposition of British Columbia
- In office February 17, 1994 – June 5, 2001
- Preceded by: Fred Gingell
- Succeeded by: Joy MacPhail

Leader of the Liberal Party of British Columbia
- In office September 11, 1993 – February 26, 2011
- Preceded by: Gordon Wilson
- Succeeded by: Christy Clark

Member of the Legislative Assembly of British Columbia
- In office May 28, 1996 – March 15, 2011
- Preceded by: Darlene Marzari
- Succeeded by: Christy Clark
- Constituency: Vancouver-Point Grey
- In office February 17, 1994 – May 28, 1996
- Preceded by: Art Cowie
- Succeeded by: Colin Hansen
- Constituency: Vancouver-Quilchena

35th Mayor of Vancouver
- In office December 8, 1986 – September 11, 1993
- Preceded by: Michael Harcourt
- Succeeded by: Philip Owen

Personal details
- Born: Gordon Muir Campbell; January 12, 1948 (age 78) Vancouver, British Columbia
- Party: BC Liberals
- Other political affiliations: Non-Partisan Association (until 1993)
- Children: 2
- Education: Dartmouth College (BA); Simon Fraser University (MBA)
- Occupation: Businessman, diplomat, politician
- Profession: Schoolteacher

Gordon Muir Campbell (born January 12, 1948) is a Canadian politician, businessman, and diplomat who served as the 34th premier of British Columbia from 2001 to 2011 and leader of the BC Liberal Party from 1993 to 2011. Prior to becoming premier, he served as the 35th mayor of Vancouver from 1986 to 1993. Following his tenure as premier, he served as Canadian High Commissioner to the United Kingdom from 2011 to 2016 and as Canada's representative to the Ismaili Imamat from 2014 to 2016.

== Early life and education ==
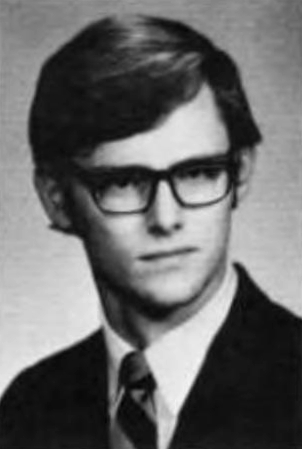
Campbell in the Dartmouth College yearbook, 1970

Campbell was born in Vancouver, British Columbia. His father, Charles Gordon (Chargo) Campbell, was a physician and an assistant dean of medicine at the University of British Columbia, until his suicide in 1961, when Gordon was 13. His mother Peg was a kindergarten assistant at University Hill Elementary School. The couple had four children. Gordon grew up in the West Point Grey neighbourhood of Vancouver and went to Stride Elementary, and University Hill Secondary School where he was student council president. Upon graduation from high school, Campbell was accepted by Dartmouth College, a well-known Ivy League institution in Hanover, New Hampshire; he had received a scholarship and a job offer so he could afford the tuition fees and defray educational expenses.

Campbell intended to study medicine but was persuaded by three English professors to shift his focus to English and urban management. He earned a Bachelor of Arts degree with a major in English. At Dartmouth College, in 1969, Campbell received a $1,500 Urban Studies Fellowship that made it possible for him to work in Vancouver's city government where he met Art Phillips, a TEAM city councilor who later became the 32nd mayor of Vancouver.

== Early career ==
After graduating from college that year, Campbell and Nancy Chipperfield married in New Westminster on July 4, 1970. Under the Canadian University Service Overseas (CUSO) program, they went to Nigeria to teach. There he coached basketball and track and field and launched literacy initiatives. Stanford accepted Campbell to pursue a master's degree in education, but the couple returned to Vancouver instead where Campbell entered law school at the University of British Columbia (UBC) and Nancy earned her education degree. Campbell's law school education was short-lived; as he soon returned to the City of Vancouver to work for Art Phillips on his mayoral campaign. When Phillips was elected in 1972, Campbell became his executive assistant, a job he held until 1976.

At 28 years old, he left Mayor Phillips's office and went to work for Marathon Realty as a project manager. In 1976, Geoffrey, the Campbells' first child, was born. In 1978, the Campbells bought a house in Point Grey, which remained their home for the next 26 years. From 1975 to 1978, Campbell pursued a Master of Business Administration degree at Simon Fraser University's Beedie School of Business. In 1979, Nancy Campbell gave birth to their second child, Nicholas.

In 1981, Campbell left Marathon Realty and started his own business, Citycore Development Corporation. Despite the economic slowdown that affected Canada that year, his company was successful and constructed several buildings in Vancouver.

After a two-year absence from civic political activities, Campbell became involved in the mayoral campaign of May Brown and was an active supporter of the Downtown Stadium for Vancouver Committee. Although Brown was unsuccessful, Campbell and the committee continued promoting the stadium to revitalize False Creek, which at the time was polluted industrial land. The committee was eventually successful, as Premier Bill Bennett announced the Downtown Stadium project in 1980.

== Vancouver Councillor and Mayor ==
Campbell was elected to Vancouver City Council in 1984 as a member of the Non-Partisan Association. He was then elected as mayor of Vancouver for three successive terms from 1986 to 1993. Notable events in civic politics during that period included the development of the Expo Lands, the re-development of Yaletown, and the foundation of the Coal Harbour residential area. One of the most significant projects of his term was the construction of the new Vancouver Public Library. He also served as chair of the Greater Vancouver Regional District and president of the Union of British Columbia Municipalities.

== Leader of the BC Liberals (1993−2011) ==
Campbell became leader of the British Columbia Liberal Party in 1993 in a three-way race with Gordon Gibson, Jr. and Gordon Wilson, the incumbent party leader, who had lost the confidence of his party. He was elected to the Legislative Assembly the next year in a by-election in Vancouver-Quilchena.

In the 1996 campaign, Campbell was elected to the Vancouver-Point Grey riding, which he held until 2010. The Liberals entered the election leading in the polls because of a fundraising scandal in the New Democratic Party (NDP). His party gained 16 seats and won a slight plurality of the popular vote, but the NDP retained enough seats to continue as the majority government. He stayed on as leader of the Opposition, opposing NDP premiers Glen Clark, Dan Miller and Ujjal Dosanjh.

In May 2000, Campbell, along with Michael de Jong and Geoffrey Plant, brought a court case against the Nisga'a Nation, the Attorney General of Canada and the Attorney General of British Columbia, parties to the first modern-day Aboriginal Treaty in British Columbia, known as the Nisga'a Final Agreement. He and the other plaintiffs claimed the treaty signed with the Nisga'a Nation was "in part inconsistent with the Constitution of Canada and therefore in part of no force and effect". However, Justice Williamson dismissed the application, judging that the enacting legislation did "establish a treaty as contemplated by Section 35 of the Constitution Act, 1982. The legislation and the Treaty are constitutionally valid."

Premier Glen Clark's government was beset by controversy, difficult economic and fiscal conditions, attacks on the NDP's building of the Fast Ferries and charges against Clark in relation to casino licensing, known as Casinogate. (Clark was eventually vindicated, though resigned his post because of the investigation.) In the BC election of 2001, Campbell's Liberals defeated the two-term NDP incumbents, taking 77 of 79 seats in the legislature. This was the largest majority of seats and the second-largest majority of the popular vote in BC history.

== Premier of British Columbia (2001−2011) ==
=== First term ===
==== Tax ====
In 2001, Campbell campaigned on a promise to reduce income taxes significantly to stimulate the economy. A day after taking office, he reduced personal income tax for all taxpayers by 25 per cent across every tax bracket. The government also introduced reductions in the corporate income tax, and eliminated the Corporation Capital Tax.

==== Spending ====
To finance the tax cuts and to balance the provincial budget, Campbell's first term was also noted for several measures of fiscal austerity such as reductions in welfare rolls and some social services, deregulation, sale of government assets (in particular the ferries built by the previous government during the Fast Ferry Scandal), reducing the size of the civil service, and closing government offices in certain areas.

==== BC Rail ====
In 2003, Campbell announced the sale of BC Rail, a publicly owned rail corporation, to the Canadian National Railway. This occurred even though he had made a campaign promise not to sell the company during the 2001 British Columbia election. In 1996, he had lost an election after promising to sell BC Rail, leading some to allege that he had hidden his true plans to get elected in 2001, and "went back to his original plan" after winning the election in 2001. This sale was condemned as unfair by the losing bidders, and triggered charges based in information found during police raids on cabinet offices in a drug-related investigation in what is known as the BC Legislature Raids.

==== Education ====
The Campbell government passed legislation in August 2001 declaring education as an essential service, therefore making it illegal for educators to go on strike. This fulfilled a platform promise made in the election campaign.

The government embarked upon the largest expansion of BC's post-secondary education system since the foundation of Simon Fraser University in 1965. In 2004, the government announced that 25,000 new post-secondary places would be established between 2004 and 2010.

The Campbell government also lifted the six-year-long tuition fee freeze that was placed on BC universities and colleges by the previous NDP government. In 2005 a tuition limit policy was put in place, capping increases at the rate of inflation.

==== Environmental ====
Campbell made significant changes, including new Environmental Assessment Legislation, as well as controversial new aquaculture policies on salmon farming. In November 2002, His government passed the Forest and Range Practices Act which reversed many of the regulations previously introduced by the former New Democrat government.

==== First Nations ====
During the 2001 election, the BC Liberals also campaigned on a promise to hold a consultative referendum seeking a mandate from the general public to negotiate treaties with First Nations. In the spring of 2002, the government held the referendum.

The referendum, led by attorney general Geoff Plant, proposed eight questions that voters were asked to either support or oppose. Critics claimed the phrasing was flawed or biased toward a predetermined response. While some critics, especially First Nations and religious groups, called for a boycott of the referendum, by the May 15 deadline almost 800,000 British Columbians had cast their ballots. Critics called for a boycott of the referendum and First Nations groups collected as many ballots as possible so that they might be destroyed publicly.

Of the ballots that were returned, over 80 per cent of participating voters agreed to all eight proposed principles. Treaty negotiations resumed.

In the lead-up to the 2005 election, Campbell discussed opening up a New Relationship with Aboriginal People. This position was directly opposite to his view of aboriginal treaties pursued in the 2000 Nisga'a Final Treaty court case, discussed above. The "New Relationship" became the foundation for agreements in principle that were made during the second term, but ultimately rejected by the membership of the First Nations involved.

==== Health care ====
In 2004, Campbell imposed an unprecedented 15% pay cut to health care employees. Early in its first term, without consulting labour unions, his government passed legislation (Bill 29, the Health and Social Services Delivery Improvement Act) that unilaterally amended labour agreements and required health authorities to contract out positions when savings could be predicted. This led to the privatization of more than 8,000 healthcare jobs. These changes met resistance from many health care workers and resulted in a strike by some of them. A court order and amendments by the government to parts of the legislation ended the strike. The unions took the issue to the Supreme Court of Canada, which ruled in 2007 that the Act violated "good faith" requirements for collective bargaining.

The Campbell government increased health funding by $3 billion during its first term in office to help meet the demand at hand and to increase wages for some health professionals. As well, they increased the number of new nurse training spaces by 2,500, an increase of 62 percent. At the same time, it nearly doubled the doctors in training and opened new medical training facilities in Victoria and Prince George.

Wage rates for doctors and nurses increased in the Campbell government's first term. Nurses received a 23.5 percent raise while doctors received a 20.6 percent raise after arbitration. Doctors had threatened to go on strike because of the original Campbell plan to slash their fees, which was seen as a breach of contract, with the dispute being sent to arbitration.

==== Impaired driving ====
In January 2003, after visiting broadcaster Fred Latremouille, Campbell was arrested and pleaded no contest for driving under the influence of alcohol while vacationing in Hawaii. According to court records, Campbell's blood-alcohol level was more than twice the legal limit. In Hawaii, drunk driving is only a misdemeanour, whereas in Canada it is a Criminal Code offence. As is customary in the United States, Campbell's mugshot was provided to the media by Hawaii police. The image has proved to be a lasting personal embarrassment, frequently used by detractors and opponents. Campbell was fined $913 (US) and the court ordered him to take part in a substance abuse program, and to be assessed for alcoholism.

A national anti-drinking and driving group, Mothers Against Drunk Driving (MADD) Canada called for Campbell to resign. Campbell refused.

==== Minimum wage ====
On November 1, 2001, the Campbell BC Liberals honoured the previous NDP government's legislation to increase the minimum wage to $8.00 per hour from $7.60, while at the same time authority was given so new entrants into the labour force could be paid $6 per hour, 25% lower than the minimum wage. In 2010, British Columbia had the lowest minimum wage amongst the 13 provinces and territories. Campbell's successor, Christy Clark, announced that the minimum wage would increase in three stages to begin on May 1, 2011.

==== 2010 Winter Olympics ====
British Columbia won the right to host the 2010 Winter Olympics on July 2, 2003. This was a joint Winter Olympics bid by Vancouver and the ski resort of Whistler. Campbell attended the final presentations in Prague, the Czech Republic.

On February 12, 2010, Campbell was in attendance at the opening ceremony for the 2010 Winter Olympics in Vancouver and attended events during the games and was present at the closing ceremony.

On April 23, 2010, Campbell received the Olympic Order from the Canadian Olympic Committee for being a dedicated proponent of the Olympic Movement.

=== Second term ===
In the May 17, 2005, election, Campbell and the BC Liberals won a second majority government with a reduced majority.

==== Economy ====
430,000 new jobs had been created in B.C. since December 2001, the best job creation record in Canada at the time. In 2007, the economy created 70,800 more jobs, almost all full-time positions. By Spring 2007, unemployment had fallen to 4.0%, the lowest rate in 30 years. However, 40,300 jobs were lost in 2008, mostly in December (35,100), and the unemployment rates sat at 7.8% as of July 2009, the same level they were at in July 2001.

==== Education ====
On October 7, 2005, following the successive imposition of contracts on BC teachers, British Columbia's teachers began an indefinite walk-out. Campbell having made striking illegal for teachers, educators referred to this as an act of civil disobedience. Despite fines and contempt charges, the teachers' walk-out lasted two weeks, and threatened to culminate in a general strike across the province.

==== Environmental ====
In 2008, Premier Campbell's government developed and entrenched in law the Climate Action Plan. The Plan is claimed by the government to be one of the most progressive plans to address greenhouse gas emissions in North America, due in part to the revenue-neutral carbon tax.

Gordon Campbell told Tim Flannery that he introduced the carbon tax in British Columbia after reading his book The Weather Makers (2005).

==== First Nations ====
The Campbell government attempted to negotiate treaties with a number of First Nations in its second term. Final agreements in principle were signed with the Tsawwassen First Nation, Maa-nulth Treaty Society, and Lheidli T’enneh First Nations. The Tsawwassen Treaty was passed by the band's membership in a heavily contested and divisive referendum but came into effect on April 3, 2009.

The Maa-nulth Treaty, which covers a group of Nuu-chah-nulth band governments, is pending ratification by the federal government while the Lheidli-T'enneh Treaty was rejected in the referendum held by that band.

==== Health care ====
The Campbell government launched the Conversation on Health, a province-wide consultation with British Columbians on their health care to lay the groundwork for changes to the principles of the Canada Health Act that were presented in the Fall of 2007.

=== Third term ===
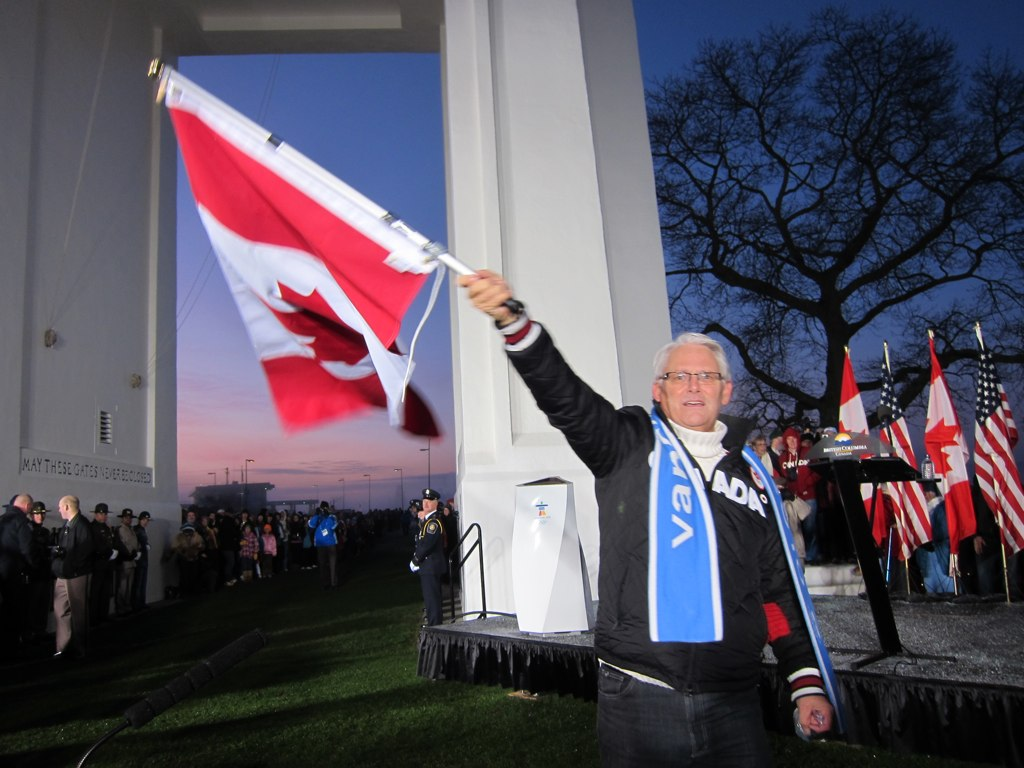
Campbell in 2010

His government were re-elected in the May 12, 2009, election. Their share of total seats remained almost unchanged, as they won 49 seats in a new expanded 85-seat legislature.

==== BC Rail e-mail controversy ====
Some five years after the BC Legislature Raids, controversy arose when it was revealed that e-mails among Campbell, his staff, and other cabinet ministers may not have been deleted years ago as first claimed. An affidavit filed by Rosemarie Hayes, the B.C. government's manager in charge of information services, suggested that copies of the e-mails may have existed as recently as May 2009, but it was ordered that they be destroyed at that time.

On July 20, 2009, the Supreme Court of British Columbia judge conducting the Basi-Virk trial, Madam Justice Elizabeth Bennett, ordered Campbell and other top officials to turn over their e-mail records to the court by August 17. These were never located nor surrendered to the Court.

==== HST controversy ====
On July 23, 2009, Campbell announced British Columbia would move towards a Harmonized Sales Tax, or HST. The new 12% sales tax would combine and replace the previous 5% Goods and Services Tax and 7% Provincial Sales Tax. The announcement was met with strong opposition from political opponents, news media, and opposition from most members of the public. However, the proposed tax received a positive reaction from the business community, strong supporters of the BC Liberals. Much of the opposition stemmed from Campbell's perceived dishonesty about the HST as his government had said it was not on their radar prior to the election despite leaked emails revealing it was, and that it equated to a tax hike for several sectors.

On August 24, representatives from the retail, resource, and film industries held a news conference to speak out in favour of harmonizing BC's sales taxes. In addition, sales tax harmonization has been hailed by the C.D. Howe Institute, a think tank, as being "crucial for B.C to maintain its economic competitiveness." David Docherty, a political science professor at Wilfrid Laurier University, noted that anti-HST sentiment was evident in left-wing populist groups who viewed it as "regressive" and those on the right who "hate all taxes". Polls consistently showed ...opposition to the HST in BC at "82 to 85 percent". "Shortly after the HST announcement, Ipsos Reid reported 85 percent opposition in British Columbia, dropping only slightly to 82 percent a few months later."

On June 11, 2010, Blair Lekstrom resigned as BC's Minister of Energy, Mines and Petroleum Resources, saying he was leaving both the cabinet and the caucus over a fundamental disagreement with the BC Liberals on the harmonized sales tax. He told The Canadian Press: "It was a tough decision but it had to be made. Fundamentally, the HST is it. The people I represent say ... we want you to put the brakes on the HST." His constituency bordered on Alberta, which had no provincial sales tax and businesses were concerned they would lose sales.

A freedom of information request came to light on September 1, 2010, revealing that the BC Liberals had formed HST-related plans prior to the 2009 election—contrary to their statements on the subject.

=== Resignation ===
On November 3, 2010, Campbell made a televised address to the public announcing his intention to resign as Premier of British Columbia. The announcement was made after months of strong political opposition to the implementation of the HST, which saw Campbell's approval rating fall to only 9%, according to an Angus Reid poll, and led to rumours that he has lost support of some members of his cabinet. Another factor in his resignation was the ongoing BC Rail Scandal trial in which the Premier and other members of his cabinet and staff were due to face embarrassing cross-examination in relation to the Basi-Virk trial, which was called to a halt with plea bargain around the same time. On December 5, 2010, while answering questions from reporters, he "hinted strongly" that he will not stay on as an MLA after his successor as Liberal leader is chosen in February, according to Rod Mickleburgh of The Globe and Mail. Campbell resigned as premier on March 14, 2011; he was succeeded by Christy Clark.

== High Commissioner to the United Kingdom (2011−2016) ==
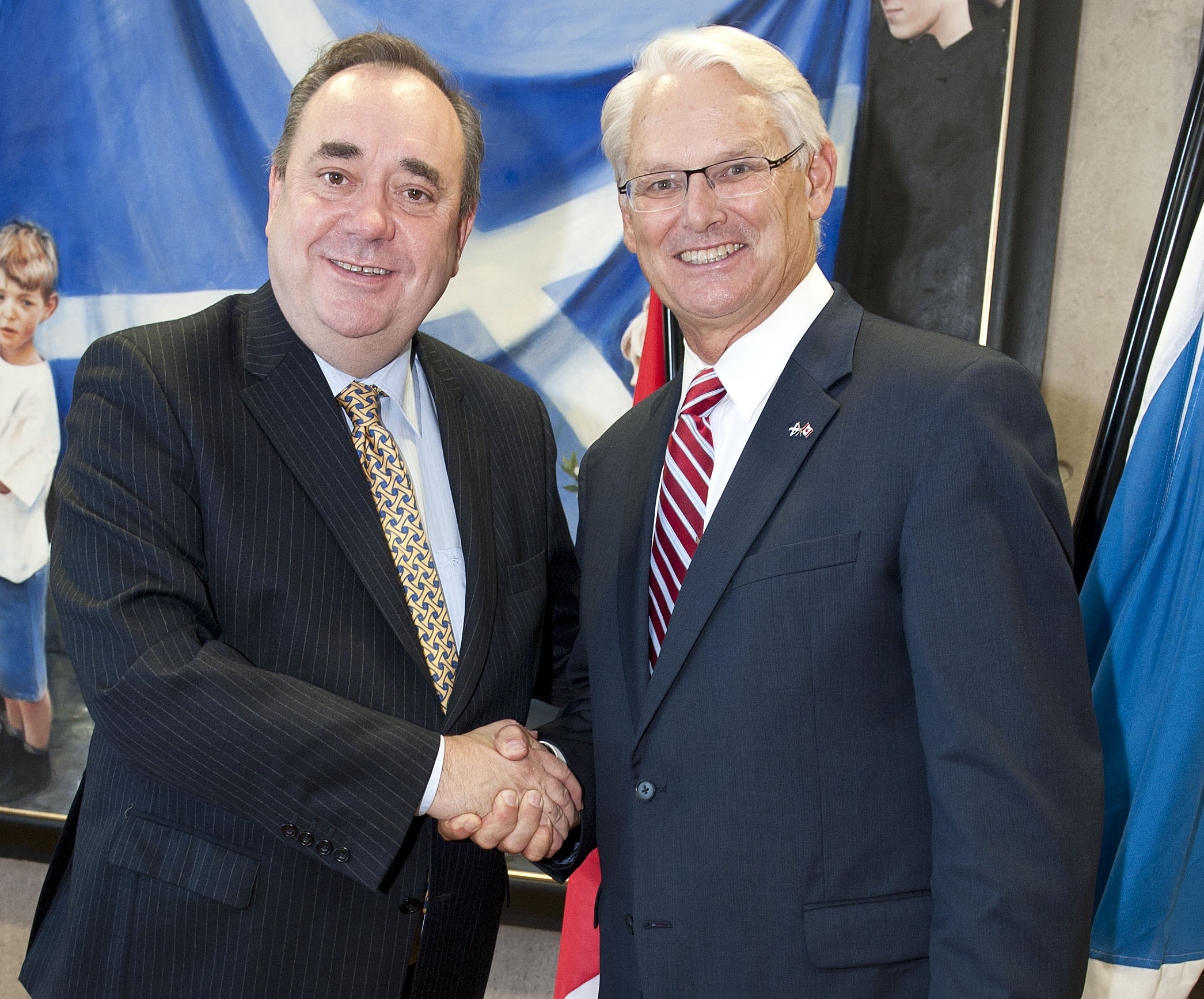
Campbell meeting with First Minister of Scotland, Alex Salmond in Edinburgh, September 2011

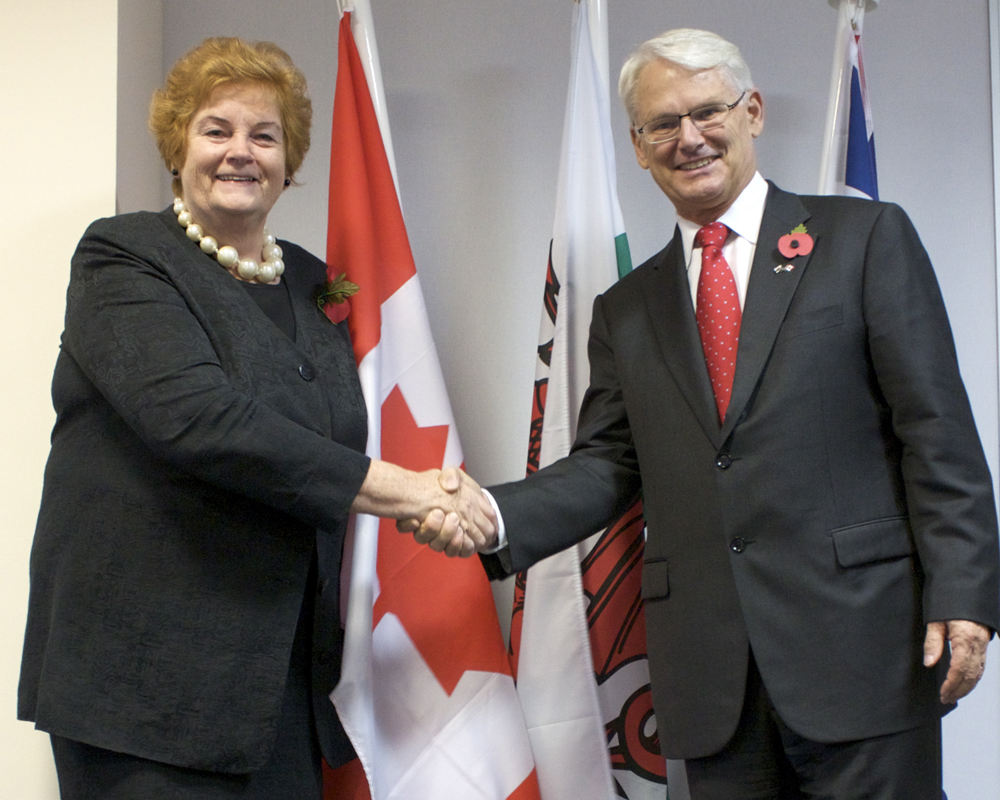
Campbell meeting Rosemary Butler, the Presiding Officer of the National Assembly for Wales in Cardiff, Wales.

In late June 2011, it was reported that Campbell was to be named Canadian High Commissioner to the United Kingdom. On August 15, 2011, Campbell was formally announced to succeed the post. On September 15, 2011, Campbell officially became the Canadian High Commissioner in London. He represented Canadian interests throughout Britain until his term ended in 2016.

Campbell was shortlisted for the Grassroot Diplomat Initiative Award in 2015 for his work on business partnership as the High Commissioner of Canada, and he remains in the directory of the Grassroot Diplomat Who's Who publication.

In January 2019, a former High Commission employee, Judith Prins, filed a sexual assault complaint with the Metropolitan Police alleging that Campbell groped her in 2013. A spokesperson for Campbell denied the allegation, saying the complaint was investigated and dismissed at the time. In September 2020, details emerged of a civil suit filed by Prins naming Campbell and the Government of Canada as defendants. She is seeking damages for anxiety, stress and lost income. Campbell responded to this news saying: "This has been settled once before, more than five years ago now. It was dealt with fully."

== Accolades ==
On September 2, 2011, it was announced that Campbell would receive the Order of British Columbia, the second Premier to be a recipient. Some believed his nomination contravened the legislation that prevented an elected official from being appointed while holding office. However, on September 7, 2011, Lance S. G. Finch, the Chief Justice of British Columbia and chair of the Order of BC Advisory Council declared that although his nomination package was received on March 10, 2011 (four days before his resignation as Premier), Campbell was appointed to the Order on September 2, 2011 at which time he was not an elected MLA.

In 2014, Thompson Rivers University gave Campbell the Honorary degree of Doctor of Laws for his contributions to the founding of their newly opened law school.

He was awarded the Queen Elizabeth II Golden Jubilee Medal in 2002 and the Queen Elizabeth II Diamond Jubilee Medal in 2012.

== Electoral history ==
2009 British Columbia general election: Vancouver-Point Grey
Party	Candidate	Votes	%	Expenditures
Liberal	Gordon Campbell	11,546	50.38	$154,282
New Democratic	Mel Lehan	9,232	40.28	$128,634
Green	Stephen Kronstein	2,012	8.78	$1,405
Sex	John Ince	130	0.56	$250
Total valid votes		22,920	100	
Total rejected ballots		134	0.58	
Turnout		23,054	55.98	

2005 British Columbia general election: Vancouver-Point Grey
Party	Candidate	Votes	%	Expenditures
Liberal	Gordon Campbell	12,498	45.98	$181,283
New Democratic	Mel Lehan	10,248	37.70	$62,749
Green	Damian Kettlewell	4,111	15.12	$7,278
Marijuana	Yolanda Perez	138	0.51	$100
Work Less	Tom Walke	126	0.46	$156
Libertarian	Jeff Monds	44	0.16	$100
Platinum	Gudrun Kost	18	0.07	$100
Total valid votes		27,183	100	
Total rejected ballots		130	0.48	
Turnout		27,313	60.94	

2001 British Columbia general election: Vancouver-Point Grey
Party	Candidate	Votes	%	Expenditures
Liberal	Gordon Campbell	13,430	56.14%	$43,396
Green	Varya Rubin	5,094	21.29%	$1,158
New Democratic	Am Johal	4,441	18.57%	$16,995
Marijuana	Alex Curylo	659	2.75%	$394
Unity	Greg Dahms	257	1.07%	$605
People's Front	Anne Jamieson	43	0.18%	$57
Total valid votes		23,924	100.00%	
Total rejected ballots		128	0.54%	
Turnout		24,052	65.80%	

1996 British Columbia general election: Vancouver-Point Grey
Party	Candidate	Votes	%	Expenditures
Liberal	Gordon Campbell	12,637	48.86	$52,970
New Democratic	Jim Green	11,074	42.81	$49,267
Progressive Democrat	Allison Mountstevens	857	3.31	$100
Green	Ralph Maud	683	2.64	$790
Reform	Sager Jan	406	1.57	$100
Natural Law	Ron Decter	76	0.29	$116
Conservative	Michael J.P. Moen	70	0.27	
Family Coalition	E'an P. Rankin	62	0.24	$100
Total valid votes		25,865	100.00	
Total rejected ballots		138	0.53	
Turnout		26,003	71.03	

British Columbia provincial by-election, February 17, 1994: Vancouver-Quilchena Resignation of Art Cowie
Party	Candidate	Votes	%	Expenditures
Liberal	Gordon Campbell	7,396	67.77	$44006.60
Social Credit	Sonja Weissenbacher	1,536	14.07	$17445.45
New Democratic	Fiona Wain	1,346	12.33	$10004.08
Green	Stuart Parker	395	3.62	$4766.09
Libertarian	Walter Boytinck	90	0.83	$400
Family Coalition	Darren Lowe	89	0.82	$668.13
Gnu Democratic Rhino Reform	Ronald McDonald	61	0.56	$0
Total valid votes		10,913	99.36	
Total rejected ballots		70	0.64	
Turnout		10,983	36.83	
Registered Voters		29,820		
Liberal hold		Swing		
Source: Elections BC

Order of precedence
Preceded by Ujjal Dosanjh as 33rd Premier of British Columbia	Order of precedence in British Columbia as of 2026	Succeeded by Christy Clark as 35th Premier of British Columbia
