= British Columbia Libertarian Party =

Provincial political party in Canada

- Leader: Alex Joehl
- President: Paul Geddes
- Secretary: Neeraj Murarka
- Deputy Leader: Sandra Filosof-Schipper
- Founded: February 1, 1986; 40 years ago
- Headquarters: Coquitlam, British Columbia
- Membership (2016): 100
- Ideology: Libertarianism
- Colours: Gold and black
- Seats in the Legislative Assembly: 0 / 93

Website
- www.libertarian.bc.ca

The British Columbia Libertarian Party is a minor libertarian party in British Columbia, Canada. It nominated its first candidates in the 1986 provincial election.

The party advocates for the creation of a provincial Constitution to protect property rights, and rejects federal infringement into areas of provincial jurisdiction seeking to change the division of powers to avoid secession. They also stand for free speech except in cases of fraud or violence. It rejects all government monopolies and collective resource ownership and promotes decentralisation and localism, decentralizing decision-making powers to local communities, families, and individuals.

In the 2020 British Columbia general election the party fielded 25 candidates and received 8,360 votes, or 0.4% of the popular vote. Keith MacIntyre received 2.6% of votes in Penticton.

== Leaders ==
Prior to 2016, the party did not have official leaders.

Leader	Term start	Term end	Notes
Clayton Welwood	October 8, 2016	October 6, 2018	
Donald Wilson	October 6, 2018	May 8, 2021	
Keith MacIntyre	May 8, 2021	2022	
Alex Joehl	February 25, 2023	present	Interim leader until May 13, 2023.

== Election results ==
Election results
Election year	Party leader	No. of overall votes	% of overall total	No. of candidates run	No. of seats won	Presence
1986		341	0.02	3	0 / 69	Extra-parliamentary
1991		860	0.06	11	0 / 75	Extra-parliamentary
1996		2,041	0.13%	17	0 / 75	Extra-parliamentary
2001	did not contest					
2005		1,053	0.06%	6	0 / 79	Extra-parliamentary
2009		1,486	0.09%	6	0 / 85	Extra-parliamentary
2013		2,050	0.11%	8	0 / 85	Extra-parliamentary
2017	Clayton Welwood	7,743	0.39%	30	0 / 87	Extra-parliamentary
2020	Donald Wilson	8,360	0.44%	25	0 / 87	Extra-parliamentary
2024	Alex Joehl	1,337	0.07%	4	0 / 87	Extra-parliamentary
2026	Alex Joehl	1,105	0.10%	4	0 / 93	Extra-parliamentary

=== By-elections ===
By-election	Date	Candidate	Votes	%	Place
Vancouver-Point Grey	March 15, 1989	Mary Anne Nylen	58	0.22	6/8
Vancouver-Quilchena	February 17, 1994	Walter Boytinck	90	0.83	5/7
Chilliwack-Hope	April 19, 2012	Lewis Dahlby	145	1.01	4/4
Vancouver-Mount Pleasant	February 2, 2016	Bonnie Boya Hu	79	0.84	4/5
Coquitlam-Burke Mountain	February 2, 2016	Paul Geddes	157	1.90	4/4
Kelowna West	February 14, 2018	Kyle Michael Ernest Geronazzo	121	0.81	5/5
Nanaimo	January 30, 2019	Bill Walker	76	0.32	6/6
Vancouver-Quilchena	April 30, 2022	Sandra Filosof-Schipper	66	0.62	5/5
Surrey South	September 10, 2022	Jason Bax	221	2.06	5/5
