= Andrew Petter =

Canadian politician

Andrew Petter CM OBC KC
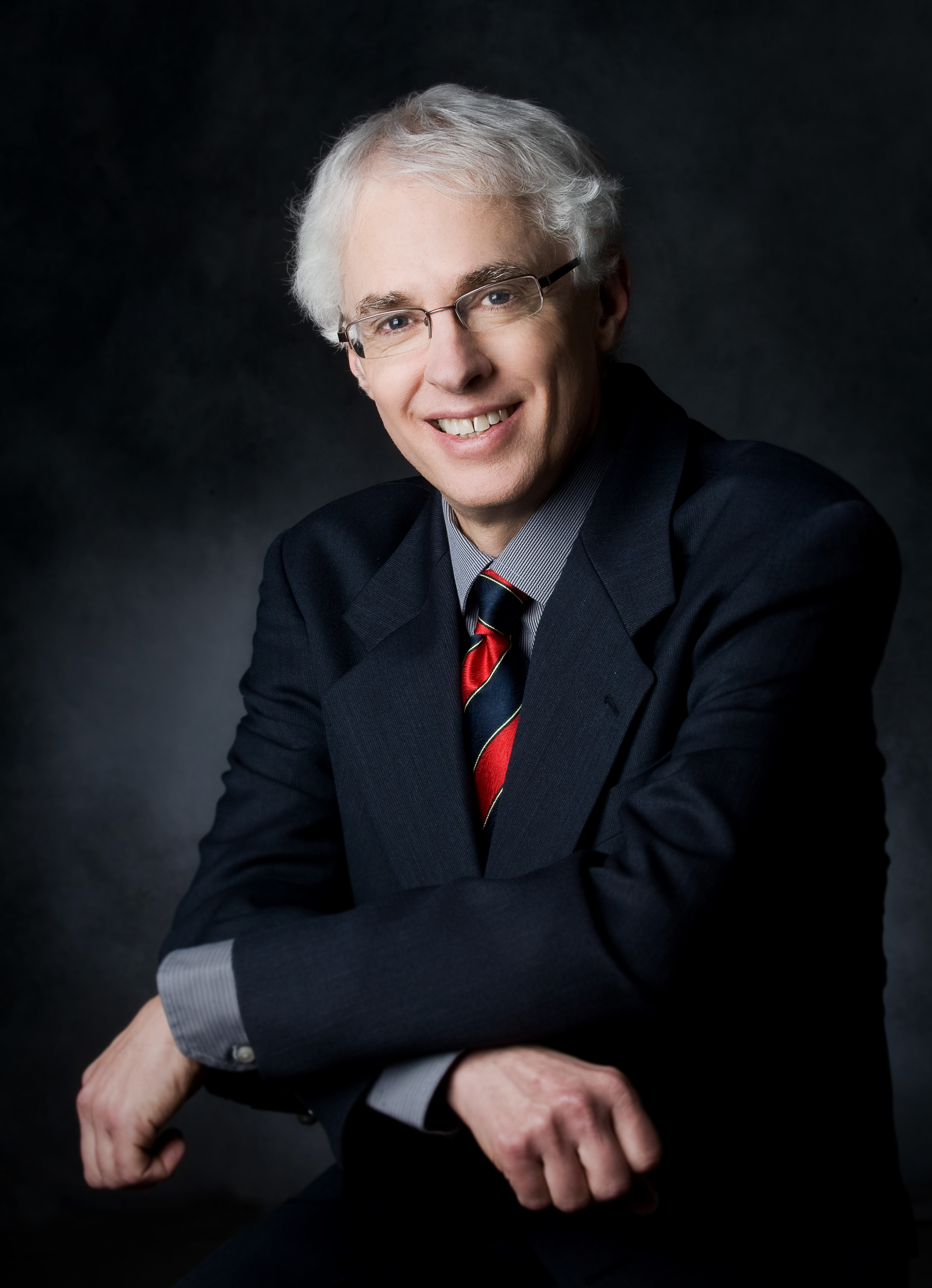
- Petter in 2010

9th President and Vice-Chancellor of Simon Fraser University
- In office September 1, 2010 – August 31, 2020
- Preceded by: Michael Stevenson
- Succeeded by: Joy Johnson

Member of the British Columbia Legislative Assembly for Saanich South
- In office October 17, 1991 – May 16, 2001
- Preceded by: Riding Established
- Succeeded by: Susan Brice

Personal details
- Born: 1953 (age 72–73) Victoria, British Columbia
- Party: New Democrat
- Domestic partner: Maureen Maloney
- Children: Dylan
- Education: Notre Dame University; University of Victoria; Cambridge University
- Profession: Professor; Lawyer

Andrew J. Petter CM OBC KC (born 1953) is a former academic and provincial politician in British Columbia, Canada. He represented the electoral district of Saanich South in the Legislative Assembly of British Columbia from 1991 to 2001. A member of the British Columbia New Democratic Party (BC NDP) caucus, he served in various cabinet posts under premiers Mike Harcourt, Glen Clark, Dan Miller and Ujjal Dosanjh, including as Attorney General of British Columbia from February to November 2000.

After politics, he worked as the dean of the University of Victoria Faculty of Law from 2002 to 2008, then served two terms as president and vice-chancellor of Simon Fraser University from 2010 to 2020. He served as board chair of provincial Crown agency Innovate BC from 2021 to 2024 and as director of Coast Capital Savings Federal Credit Union from 2024 to 2026. He has written extensively about the role of the Canadian Charter of Rights and Freedoms and its effect on government powers and decision making. Since 2021, he has practised law as counsel with Arvay Finlay LLP.

== Background and education ==
Andrew Petter was born in Victoria, British Columbia in 1953, and grew up in the adjacent suburb of Oak Bay. His grandfather Ernest Petter was an English industrialist who unsuccessfully ran for the House of Commons of the United Kingdom on three occasions before moving to the Vancouver Island town of Comox in 1938; he then lived for a while in Saanich before moving back to the UK in 1954.

Andrew's Jewish mother Elizabeth graduated from the University of Music and Performing Arts Vienna in the 1930s, then joined the Tanzgruppe Bodenwieser as a dancer. She was on tour in London when she met Ernest Petter's son Gordon; the couple married in Vienna and lived there until the Anschluss. After escaping Austria, the couple and Andrew's three elder siblings moved to Vancouver Island in 1946 to join Ernest.

In the 1960s the family moved to the interior city of Nelson, where Gordon Petter taught history at the now defunct Notre Dame University College. Andrew graduated from the city's L.V. Rogers Secondary School as valedictorian, then pursued undergraduate studies at Notre Dame. He also hosted an open-line show at radio station CKKC, interviewing figures such as then-premier Dave Barrett and former premier W.A.C. Bennett, before leaving the station to work as an executive assistant to Nelson-Creston member of the Legislative Assembly Lorne Nicolson.

He began studying political science at the University of Victoria (UVic) in 1976, then entered the school's law program in 1978, graduating with an LL.B. in 1981 and winning the Law Society of British Columbia gold medal for his top-of-class standing. He subsequently attended Cambridge University on a Commonwealth Scholarship, receiving an LL.M. in 1982 and graduating with first class honours.

== Career ==
Petter briefly worked at the Saskatchewan Department of Justice, serving as the Constitutional Branch's adviser. He then taught at Osgoode Hall Law School in Toronto as an assistant professor between 1984 and 1986, before joining his alma mater, the University of Victoria Faculty of Law in 1986, becoming associate professor in 1988.

=== Politics ===
Recruited by BC NDP leader Mike Harcourt to enter politics, Petter was twice elected to the Legislative Assembly of British Columbia in the provincial elections of 1991 and 1996, representing the riding of Saanich South. His constituency work included establishing the Galloping Goose Regional Trail for cyclists.

He was named Minister of Aboriginal Affairs in November 1991 by Premier Harcourt. In that role, he worked alongside Prime Minister Brian Mulroney, federal Minister of Indian Affairs and Northern Development Tom Siddon and Harcourt in the First Nations Task Force, which created and put into effect the Treaty Commission Act in British Columbia in May 1993. He then served as Minister of Forests from September 1993 to February 1996, with the BC Forest Practices Code being established during his term.

After Glen Clark took over as premier in February 1996, Petter was appointed Minister of Health, Minister Responsible for Seniors, and Minister Responsible for Intergovernmental Relations. That June he was named Minister of Finance and Corporate Relations, while holding on to the intergovernmental portfolio and dropping the health and seniors file. He then served as Minister of Advanced Education, Training and Technology and Minister of Intergovernmental Relations from February 1998 onwards, adding the role of Minister Responsible for Youth in August 1999 after Clark resigned and Dan Miller took over as premier and interim NDP leader.

Following Ujjal Dosanjh's election as new NDP leader, Petter was named Attorney General and Minister Responsible for Human Rights in February 2000. He declined to run again in the 2001 provincial election, and was dropped from the cabinet in November 2000, replaced in both roles by Graeme Bowbrick.

=== Higher education ===
Subsequent to his career in politics, he served as dean of the University of Victoria's faculty of law from 2001 until 2008 (the first year as acting dean), before returning to teaching. During his time as dean, the UVic Faculty established a new graduate law program, created a national aboriginal economic development chair and supported the first cohort of the Akitsiraq Law School in Nunavut.

He was named president and vice-chancellor of Simon Fraser University in January 2010, starting his term on September 1 that year. He was succeeded by Joy Johnson in 2020.

=== Other Service ===
From 2021 to 2024, Petter served as chair of the board of directors of Innovate BC, a provincial Crown agency responsible for supporting innovation and growth in the technology sector in British Columbia. From 2024 to 2026, he served as a director of Coast Capital Savings Federal Credit Union. He currently serves as a member of the Board of Trustees of the University of Central Asia and as a member of the Advisory Board of the UIIN (University Industry Innovation Network).

== Honours and awards ==
Country	Order	Class or position	Year	Citation
Canada	Order of Canada	Member	2018	
Canada	Order of British Columbia	Member	2021	

=== Other distinctions ===
- 2002: Honorary citizen award from the City of Victoria
- 2003: Distinguished alumni award from the University of Victoria
- 2018: Peter Lougheed Award for Leadership in Public Policy from the Public Policy Forum
- 2020: Honorary doctorate (LLD) from Kwantlen Polytechnic University
- 2022: Honorary doctorate (LLD) from Simon Fraser University
- 2023: Honorary doctorate (LLD) from the University of Victoria
- 2024: King Charles III Coronation Medal

== Selected publications ==
- "Private Rights/Public Wrongs: The Liberal Lie of the Charter" in the University of Toronto Law Journal, 1995
- "The Politics of the Charter", Supreme Court Law Review, 1986
- "Rights in Conflict: The Dilemma of Charter Legitimacy", University of British Columbia Law Review, 1989
- "Federalism and the Myth of the Federal Spending Power", Canadian Bar Review, 1989

== Electoral results ==
1991 British Columbia general election: Saanich South
Party	Candidate	Votes	%	Expenditures
New Democratic	Andrew Petter	10,254	44.63	$42,789
Liberal	Lorne Peasland	8,309	36.17	$7,035
Social Credit	Allen L. Vandekerkhove	4,218	18.36	$92,822
Western Canada Concept	Douglas Christie	193	0.84	–
Total valid votes		22,974	100.00	
Total rejected ballots		300	1.03	
Turnout		23,274	79.87	

1996 British Columbia general election: Saanich South
Party	Candidate	Votes	%	Expenditures
New Democratic	Andrew Petter	11,394	46.11	$46,181
Liberal	Frank Leonard	10,867	43.98	$42,352
Progressive Democrat	Cherie Dealey	1,198	4.85	$6,794
Reform	Colin Knecht	676	2.74	$2,842
Green	Jack Etkin	343	1.39	$1,081
Natural Law	Gail Anderson	86	0.35	$100
Western Canada Concept	Douglas Christie	66	0.27	$100
Libertarian	Ken Wiebe	40	0.16	–
Common Sense	Laery Braaten	38	0.15	$100
Total valid votes		24,708	100.00	
Total rejected ballots		141	0.57	
Turnout		24,849	77.16	

British Columbia provincial government of Ujjal Dosanjh
Cabinet posts (2)
Predecessor	Office	Successor
Ujjal Dosanjh	Attorney General of British Columbia; February 29, 2000–November 1, 2000	Graeme Bowbrick
Ujjal Dosanjh	Minister Responsible for Human Rights; February 29, 2000–November 1, 2000	Graeme Bowbrick
British Columbia provincial government of Dan Miller
Cabinet posts (3)
Predecessor	Office	Successor
cont'd from Clark Ministry	Minister of Advanced Education, Training and Technology; August 25, 1999–February 24, 2000	Graeme Bowbrick
cont'd from Clark Ministry	Minister of Intergovernmental Relations; August 25, 1999–February 24, 2000	Greg Halsey-Brandt
Glen Clark	Minister Responsible for Youth; August 25, 1999–February 24, 2000	Graeme Bowbrick
British Columbia provincial government of Glen Clark
Cabinet posts (6)
Predecessor	Office	Successor
Position re-titled	Minister of Intergovernmental Relations; February 18, 1998–August 25, 1999	cont'd into Miller Ministry
Tom Perry	Minister of Advanced Education, Training and Technology; February 18, 1998–August 25, 1999	cont'd into Miller Ministry
Elizabeth Cull	Minister of Finance and Corporate Relations; June 17, 1996–February 18, 1998	Joy MacPhail
Position established	Minister Responsible for Intergovernmental Relations; February 28, 1996–February 18, 1998	Position re-titled
Paul Ramsey	Minister of Health; February 28, 1996–June 17, 1996	Joy MacPhail
Paul Ramsey	Minister Responsible for Seniors; February 28, 1996–June 17, 1996	Joy MacPhail
British Columbia provincial government of Mike Harcourt
Cabinet posts (2)
Predecessor	Office	Successor
Dan Miller	Minister of Forests; September 15, 1993–February 22, 1996	Dennis Streifel
John Savage	Minister of Aboriginal Affairs; November 5, 1991–September 15, 1993	John Cashore
