= Elizabeth Cull =

Canadian politician (born 1952)

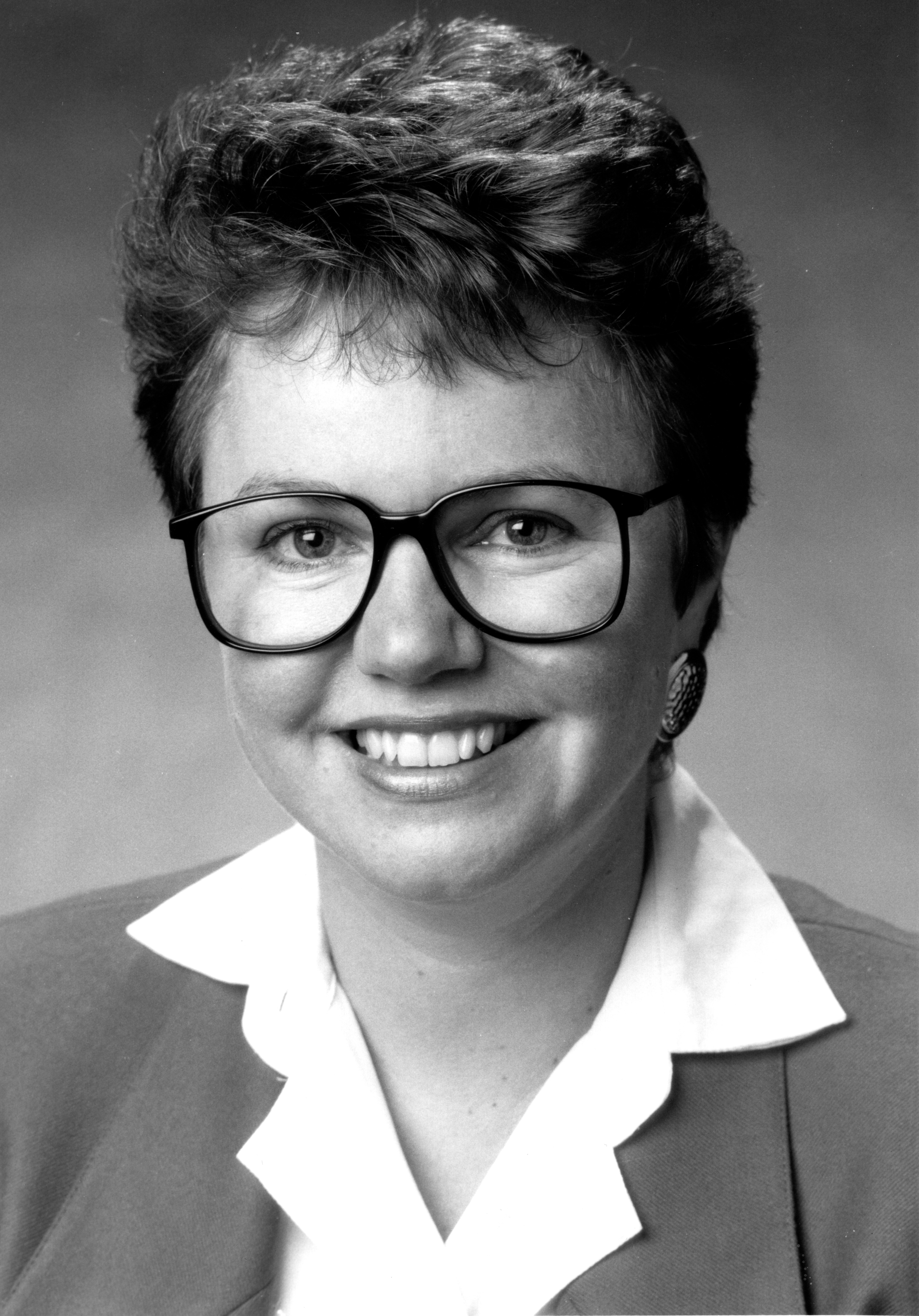

Member of the British Columbia Legislative Assembly for Oak Bay-Gordon Head
- In office December 13, 1989 – May 28, 1996
- Preceded by: Brian Ray Douglas Smith
- Succeeded by: Ida Chong

Minister of Health & Minister Responsible for Seniors of British Columbia
- In office November 5, 1991 – September 15, 1993
- Premier: Michael Harcourt
- Preceded by: William Bruce Strachan
- Succeeded by: Paul Ramsey

5th Deputy Premier of British Columbia
- In office September 15, 1993 – February 22, 1996
- Premier: Michael Harcourt
- Preceded by: Anita Hagen
- Succeeded by: Dan Miller

Minister of Finance and Corporation Relations
- In office September 15, 1993 – June 17, 1996
- Premier: Michael Harcourt; Glen Clark
- Preceded by: Glen Clark
- Succeeded by: Andrew Petter

Minister of Environment, Lands and Parks
- In office May 10, 1995 – August 16, 1995
- Premier: Michael Harcourt
- Preceded by: Moe Sihota
- Succeeded by: Moe Sihota

Personal details
- Born: 21 February 1952 (age 74) London, England, United Kingdom
- Party: NDP

Elizabeth Cull (born 21 February 1952) is a Canadian politician in the province of British Columbia and small-business owner. She was an NDP MLA for the riding of Oak Bay-Gordon Head from 1989 to 1996.

== Political career ==
Cull was first elected to the legislature in a by-election held on December 13, 1989, defeating Social Credit candidate Susan Brice and becoming the first New Democrat to win Oak Bay-Gordon Head. She was re-elected on October 17, 1991 in the subsequent provincial general election.

=== Minister of Health ===
In 1991, Cull was appointed Minister of Health in Premier Mike Harcourt's first cabinet, the first woman to be named to the position.

While Minister of Health, Cull opposed the federal government's proposal to extend patent protection for brand name drugs, and appeared in Ottawa before a Commons legislative committee to speak against the plan. Cull established regional health authorities in BC to bring the governance and delivery of health services "closer to home", legalized midwifery and initiated a home birth pilot project, and commissioned a report to study access to reproductive health care services across BC.

=== Minister of Finance ===
In 1993, in the mid-term cabinet shuffle, Harcourt appointed Cull Minister of Finance (the first woman to ever hold the position) and Deputy Premier.

As Minister of Finance, Cull opposed the federal Liberal push to harmonize the HST in 1996, and brought in two provincial budgets.

The 1994 budget brought in a three-year tax freeze, eliminated the property transfer tax for first-time home buyers, exempted green power equipment from sales taxes, and added 8,100 post-secondary education spaces. The 1995 budget extended the three-year tax freeze, increased post-secondary and health care funding, brought in a long-term debt management plan, and imposed a number of cost-savings measures.

The 1996 budget projected a $25M operating surplus, but when the public accounts were calculated at the end of 1996 the operating result was a $355M deficit, the result of a 1.8% revenue over-estimate. Opponents of the government tried and failed to use the error to unseat the government after the 1996 election, with the judge concluding that the Minister had used her best judgement in projecting revenues.

== After politics ==
Cull was defeated by Ida Chong in the 1996 general election. After leaving elected office, Elizabeth established her own consulting firm, assisting private and public sector organizations understand the public policy process.

Cull later served as Chief of Staff to Premier Ujjal Dosanjh.

Cull was hired as an adjunct professor at Royal Roads University where she taught leadership, as well as at the United Way of the Lower Mainland's Public Policy Institute and the Women's Campaign School.

In 2002, Cull entered the world of entrepreneurship, opening a "Dig This" gardening store on Oak Bay Avenue in Victoria. Three years later she decided to buy not just the Market Square location, but the entire franchise of all four high-end gardening stores.

Cull also worked as a radio personality on the political panel of the CBCV-FM CBC Radio One program On the Island until September 2012.

On September 13, 2012, Elizabeth Cull announced her intention to seek the federal NDP nomination for Victoria, but lost to Victoria lawyer Murray Rankin.
