= Michael Stephenson =

Michael Stephenson or Stevenson may refer to:

- Michael Stephenson (filmmaker) (born 1978), American film director, producer, writer and actor
- Michael Stephenson (rugby union) (born 1980), English rugby union footballer
- Mike Stephenson (born 1947), English rugby league footballer and commentator
- Michael Stevenson (educator) (born 1953), President Emeritus and Vice-Chancellor of Simon Fraser University
- Mike Stevenson (1927–1994), English cricketer
- Michael Stevenson (actor), English actor
- Michael Stevenson (cyclist) (born 1984), Swedish cyclist
- Micheal Ray Stevenson (born 1989), American rapper, known as Tyga
