= BCIC =

BCIC may refer to:

- Innovate BC, formerly known as the BC Innovation Council, a crown corporation in British Columbia, Canada, which promotes the province's tech industry
- Bangladesh Chemical Industries Corporation, a government owned corporation in Bangladesh
