= Wtfast =

Canadian gaming company

AAA Internet Publishing Inc.
- Trade name: wtfast
- Company type: Private
- Industry: Gaming
- Founded: December 1, 2009
- Founder: Rob Bartlett
- Headquarters: 1441 Ellis Street; Kelowna, British Columbia; V1Y 2A3
- Website: www.wtfast.com

AAA Internet Publishing Inc., doing business as wtfast, is a Canadian company that provides an optimized gaming network, also known as the Gamers Private Network (GPN), for MMO, FPS, and MOBA gamers. It is a platform that online gamers use to access gaming servers with an uninterrupted connection. The company is operated by AAA Internet Publishing, Inc. with headquarters in Kelowna, British Columbia.

== History ==
The company was initially founded by Rob Bartlett in 1997, as AAA Internet Publishing Inc. to provide internet and technology services. However, the trademark name wtfast was registered in December 1, 2009, and the company has since operated under that name to provide lag reduction services for MMO games. In 2014, it was the top ten finalist of BCIC New Ventures Competition. In 2015, it was the top five national finalist for the TELUS and The Globe & Mail Small Business Competition. In 2016, wtfast was the finalist of Sir Richard Branson's Extreme Tech Challenge. Since 2017, some of the notable company partners include ASUS, MSI, Gigabyte, Linksys, HiNet, and ASI Networks.
