= Diana Gibson (politician) =

Canadian politician

Diana Gibson MLA
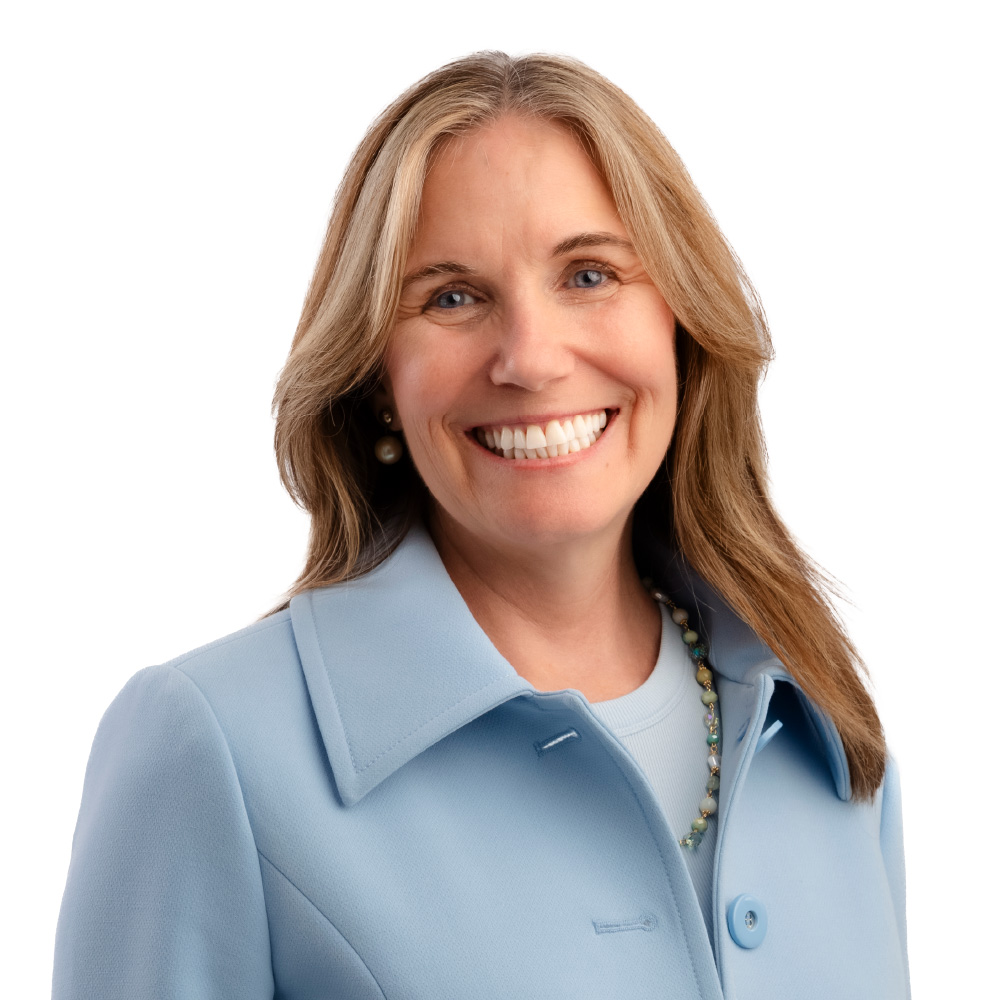
- Campaign portrait, 2024

Minister of Citizens' Services of British Columbia
- In office July 17, 2025 – November 20, 2026
- Premier: David Eby
- Preceded by: George Chow
- Succeeded by: Bruce Banman

Minister of Jobs, Economic Development and Innovation of British Columbia
- In office November 18, 2024 – July 17, 2025
- Premier: David Eby
- Preceded by: Brenda Bailey
- Succeeded by: Ravi Kahlon (Jobs and Economic Growth)

Member of the British Columbia Legislative Assembly for Oak Bay-Gordon Head
- Incumbent
- Assumed office October 19, 2024
- Preceded by: Murray Rankin

Personal details
- Party: BC NDP
- Profession: Non-profit executive

Diana Gibson MLA is a Canadian politician who has served as a member of the Legislative Assembly of British Columbia (MLA) representing the electoral district of Oak Bay-Gordon Head since 2024. She is a member of the New Democratic Party.

== Background ==
Prior to entering politics, Gibson was the research director of the Parkland Institute, a progressive policy research institute at the University of Alberta. At Parkland, Gibson was involved in several policy areas, but focussed in particular on the healthcare system, the subject of her book. Following leaving the Parkland Institute, Gibson served in several roles in various progressive organizations across Canada, including Canadians for Tax Fairness, a non-profit that advocates for progressive tax policies.

Gibson was most recently the executive director of the Greater Victoria Community Social Planning Council (CSPC), a local non-profit that runs social services. Under her leadership the CSPC grew from 2 staff to 16, and launched several programs such as the Greater Victoria Rent Bank, the ID Bank, and their Housing Policy and Climate Equity Programs.

== Electoral history ==
2026 British Columbia general election: Oak Bay-Gordon Head
** Preliminary results — Not yet official **
Party	Candidate	Votes	%	±%
New Democratic	Diana Gibson	10,176	36.88	
Conservative	Stan Sipos	8,373	30.35	
Green	Andrew Appleton	6,164	22.34	
CentreBC	Andrew Weaver	2,846	10.31	—
Total valid votes		27,559	99.88	
Total rejected ballots		32	0.12	
Turnout		27,591		
Registered voters				
New Democratic hold		Swing		−6.88
Source: Elections BC

2024 British Columbia general election: Oak Bay-Gordon Head
Party	Candidate	Votes	%	±%	Expenditures
New Democratic	Diana Gibson	14,519	49.10	-2.02	$45,884.22
Conservative	Stephen Andrew	8,542	28.89	–	$27,538.99
Green	Lisa Gunderson	6,509	22.01	-3.51	$56,199.87
Total valid votes/expense limit		29,570	99.81	–	$71,700.08
Total rejected ballots		55	0.19	–	
Turnout		29,625	69.80	+2.01	
Registered voters		42,442			
New Democratic hold		Swing		–	
Source: Elections BC
