= Ida Chong =

Canadian politician

Ida Chong CGA
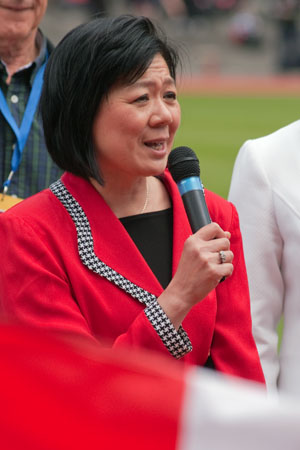

Member of the British Columbia Legislative Assembly for Oak Bay-Gordon Head
- In office May 28, 1996 – May 14, 2013
- Preceded by: Elizabeth Cull
- Succeeded by: Andrew Weaver

Minister of State for Women's and Seniors' Services of British Columbia
- In office January 26, 2004 – December 15, 2004
- Premier: Gordon Campbell
- Succeeded by: Wendy McMahon

Minister of Advanced Education of British Columbia
- In office December 15, 2004 – June 16, 2005
- Premier: Gordon Campbell
- Preceded by: Shirley Bond
- Succeeded by: Murray Coell

Minister of Community Services of British Columbia
- In office June 16, 2005 – June 23, 2008
- Premier: Gordon Campbell
- Preceded by: Murray Coell
- Succeeded by: Blair Lekstrom

Minister responsible for Seniors' and Women's Issues of British Columbia
- In office June 16, 2005 – June 23, 2008
- Premier: Gordon Campbell
- Preceded by: Wendy McMahon
- Succeeded by: Position abolished

Minister of Technology, Trade and Economic Development of British Columbia
- In office June 23, 2008 – January 19, 2009
- Premier: Gordon Campbell
- Preceded by: Colin Hansen
- Succeeded by: Ida Chong (Technology and Economic Development)

Minister responsible for Asia-Pacific Initiative of British Columbia
- In office June 23, 2008 – June 10, 2009
- Premier: Gordon Campbell
- Preceded by: Colin Hansen
- Succeeded by: Position abolished

Minister of Small Business, Technology and Economic Development of British Columbia
- In office January 19, 2009 – June 10, 2009
- Premier: Gordon Campbell
- Preceded by: Kevin Krueger (Small Business), Ida Chong (Technology, Economic Development)
- Succeeded by: Iain Black

Minister of Healthy Living and Sport of British Columbia
- In office June 10, 2009 – October 25, 2010
- Premier: Gordon Campbell
- Preceded by: Mary Polak
- Succeeded by: Position abolished

Minister of Science and Universities of British Columbia
- In office October 25, 2010 – March 14, 2011
- Premier: Gordon Campbell
- Preceded by: Moira Stilwell (Advanced Education and Labour Market Development)
- Succeeded by: Naomi Yamamoto (Advanced Education)

Minister of Regional Economic and Skills Development of British Columbia
- In office November 22, 2010 – March 14, 2011
- Premier: Gordon Campbell
- Preceded by: Moira Stilwell
- Succeeded by: Position abolished

Minister of Community, Sport and Cultural Development of British Columbia
- In office March 14, 2011 – September 5, 2012
- Premier: Christy Clark
- Preceded by: Stephanie Cadieux
- Succeeded by: Bill Bennett

Minister of Aboriginal Relations and Reconciliation of British Columbia
- In office September 5, 2012 – June 10, 2013
- Premier: Christy Clark
- Preceded by: Mary Polak
- Succeeded by: John Rustad

Personal details
- Born: 1956 or 1957 (age 69–70) Victoria, British Columbia
- Party: BC Liberals
- Profession: Certified General Accountant

Chinese name
- Traditional Chinese: 張杏芳
- Simplified Chinese: 张杏芳
Transcriptions
Standard Mandarin
- Hanyu Pinyin: Zhāng Xìngfāng
Yue: Cantonese
- Jyutping: Zoeng^{1} Hang^{6}-fong^{1}

Ida Chong (Chinese: 張杏芳; pinyin: Zhāng Xìngfāng; born 1956 or 1957) is a Canadian politician who served as the member of the Legislative Assembly (MLA) of British Columbia for Oak Bay-Gordon Head from 1996 until 2013. As part of the Liberal Party caucus, she was a provincial cabinet minister from 2004 to 2013, serving in various portfolios under premiers Gordon Campbell and Christy Clark. Chong and New Democratic Party MLA Jenny Kwan together became the first Chinese-Canadian members of the BC Legislative Assembly.

Prior to her election as MLA, she served as municipal councillor for the District of Saanich from 1993 to 1996. In 2014 she finished third in the mayoral election of Victoria, British Columbia.

== Background ==
Chong was born in Victoria as one of eight children to father Peter and mother Yokee Yee. The family resided near the city's Chinatown before moving to Saanich. Chong became a Certified General Accountant in 1981, and launched her own accounting firm with business partner Karen Kesteloo in 1985. She was named fellow of the Certified General Accountants of BC in 2006, and was awarded a CGA-BC lifetime membership in 2014.

She was elected municipal councillor for Saanich in 1993, serving until 1996. Between 1995 and 1996 she represented Saanich at the Capital Regional District board of directors.

== Provincial politics ==
Chong ran as the BC Liberal candidate for Oak Bay-Gordon Head in the 1996 provincial election, defeating incumbent New Democratic Party (NDP) candidate Elizabeth Cull to become the riding's MLA. Together with NDP MLA Jenny Kwan, Chong was one of the first two Chinese-Canadian members of the BC Legislative Assembly. She served as opposition critic for Small Business and deputy critic for Finance in her first term. Chong was re-elected in 2001, 2005 and 2009, before losing to the Green Party's Andrew Weaver in 2013.

Following the Liberals' landslide victory in the 2001 election, Chong was named to the Treasury Board, and served as chair of the Government Caucus Committee on Economy and Government Operations. She first entered Gordon Campbell's cabinet in January 2004 as Minister of State for Women's and Seniors' Services, before being named Minister of Advanced Education that December. She reprised the Seniors' and Women's Issues portfolio after the 2005 election, and went on to serve as Minister of Community Services; Minister Responsible for the Asia-Pacific Initiative; Minister of Small Business, Technology and Economic Development; Minister of Healthy Living and Sport; Minister of Science and Universities; and Minister of Regional Economic and Skills Development under Campbell.

Chong was the subject of an MLA recall under the British Columbia Recall and Initiative Act in 2010, as part of a larger campaign opposing the Liberal government's introduction of the Harmonized Sales Tax. The recall ultimately failed, coming up short of the required signatures.

After Christy Clark took over as premier in 2011, Chong was named Minister of Community, Sport and Cultural Development. She subsequently served as Minister of Aboriginal Relations and Reconciliation from September 2012 until the end of her term in 2013. After losing re-election in 2013, she was appointed to the University of Victoria's Board of Governors.

== 2014 Victoria municipal election ==
On September 18, 2014, Chong announced her intention to run for mayor of the City of Victoria in that November's municipal election. Chong subsequently lost, coming a distant third behind new mayor Lisa Helps, and previous mayor Dean Fortin. She then returned to practising accounting, joining Victoria firm Chan & Associates in 2018.

== Community volunteer work ==
Chong has been an active member of the Victoria, BC community volunteering on a number of boards.

- Inaugural Member, Victoria Chinese Commerce Association
- Director, Victoria Dragon Boat Festival
