= Oak Bay-Gordon Head =

Provincial electoral district in British Columbia, Canada

British Columbia electoral district

Provincial electoral district
- Legislature: Legislative Assembly of British Columbia
MLA
Diana Gibson
New Democratic
- First contested: 1979
- Last contested: 2026

Demographics
- Population (2021): 56,466
- Area (km²): 302
- Pop. density (per km²): 187
- Census division: Capital Regional District
- Census subdivision(s): Oak Bay, Saanich, Victoria

Oak Bay-Gordon Head is a provincial electoral district for the Legislative Assembly of British Columbia.

== Demographics ==
Population, 2021	56,466
Area (km^{2})	302
Pop. density (people per km^{2})	187
Source: BC Electoral Boundaries Commission

== Geography ==
After restructuring prior to the 2017 election, Oak Bay-Gordon Head consists of the entirety of Oak Bay, as well as portions of Saanich and Victoria. The Saanich portions of the electoral district include Gordon Head, Cadboro Bay, and the Panhandle east of Shelbourne Street. The Victoria portions are made up of the Jubilee and Gonzales neighbourhoods east of Richmond Road. The University of Victoria, Camosun College Lansdowne campus and the Jubliee Hospital are located within Oak Bay-Gordon Head.

== Members of the Legislative Assembly ==
This riding has elected the following members of the Legislative Assembly:

Assembly	Years	Member	Party
Oak Bay-Gordon Head; Riding created from Oak Bay
32nd	1979–1983	Brian Smith	Social Credit
33rd	1983–1986	Brian Smith	Social Credit
34th	1986–1989	Brian Smith	Social Credit
34th	1989–1991	Elizabeth Cull	New Democratic
35th	1991–1996	Elizabeth Cull	New Democratic
36th	1996–2001	Ida Chong	Liberal
37th	2001–2005	Ida Chong	Liberal
38th	2005–2009	Ida Chong	Liberal
39th	2009–2013	Ida Chong	Liberal
40th	2013–2017	Andrew Weaver	Green
41st	2017–2020	Andrew Weaver	Green
41st	2020–2020	Andrew Weaver	Independent
42nd	2020–2024	Murray Rankin	New Democratic
43rd	2024–2026	Diana Gibson	New Democratic
44th	2026–present	Diana Gibson	New Democratic

== Election results ==
2026 British Columbia general election
** Preliminary results — Not yet official **
Party	Candidate	Votes	%	±%
New Democratic	Diana Gibson	9,200	37.04	-12.06
Conservative	Stan Sipos	7,599	30.59	+1.70
Green	Andrew Appleton	5,452	21.95	-0.06
CentreBC	Andrew Weaver	2,590	10.43	–
Total valid votes		24,841	99.88	
Total rejected ballots		30	0.12	-0.07
Turnout		24,871	99.88	
Registered voters		24,871		
New Democratic hold		Swing		-6.88
Source: Elections BC

2024 British Columbia general election
Party	Candidate	Votes	%	±%	Expenditures
New Democratic	Diana Gibson	14,519	49.10	-2.02	$45,884.22
Conservative	Stephen Andrew	8,542	28.89	–	$27,538.99
Green	Lisa Gunderson	6,509	22.01	-3.51	$56,199.87
Total valid votes/expense limit		29,570	99.81	–	$71,700.08
Total rejected ballots		55	0.19	–	
Turnout		29,625	69.80	+2.01	
Registered voters		42,442			
New Democratic hold		Swing		–	
Source: Elections BC

2020 British Columbia general election
Party	Candidate	Votes	%	±%	Expenditures
New Democratic	Murray Rankin	14,748	51.12	+27.50	$54,662.71
Green	Nicole Duncan	7,362	25.52	−26.68	$10,054.16
Liberal	Roxanne Helme	6,597	22.87	−0.88	$56,823.54
Communist	Florian Castle	142	0.49	–	$123.40
Total valid votes		28,849	99.55	–	
Total rejected ballots		129	0.45	+0.14	
Turnout		28,978	67.79	-4.20	
Registered voters		42,749			
New Democratic gain from Green		Swing		+27.09	
Source: Elections BC

2017 British Columbia general election
Party	Candidate	Votes	%	±%	Expenditures
Green	Andrew Weaver	15,405	52.20	+11.77	$50,974
Liberal	Alex Dutton	7,008	23.74	−5.55	$62,220
New Democratic	Bryce Casavant	6,972	23.63	−4.79	$42,402
Vancouver Island Party	Jin Dong Yang-Riley	66	0.23	–	$100
4BC	Xaanja Ganja Free	59	0.20	–	$115
Total valid votes		29,510	100.00	–	
Total rejected ballots		89	0.30	−0.08	
Turnout		29,599	71.99	+2.43	
Registered voters		42,117			
Green notional hold		Swing			
Source: Elections BC

2013 British Columbia general election
Party	Candidate	Votes	%	±%	Expenditures
Green	Andrew Weaver	10,722	40.43	+31.52	$111,365
Liberal	Ida Chong	7,767	29.29	−17.35	$128,726
New Democratic	Jessica Van der Veen	7,536	28.42	−16.03	$105,108
Conservative	Greg Kazakoff	492	1.86	–	$3,550
Total valid votes		26,517	100.00	–	
Total rejected ballots		102	0.38	−0.25	
Turnout		26,619	69.56	+2.70	
Registered voters		38,267			
Green gain from Liberal		Swing		+24.44	
Source: Elections BC

B.C. General Election 2009: Oak Bay-Gordon Head
Party	Candidate	Votes	%	±%
Liberal	Ida Chong	11,877	46.64%	-1.16%
New Democratic	Jessica Van der Veen	11,316	44.45%	+2.14%
Green	Steven Johns	2,330	8.91%	+0.65%
Total valid votes				

2005 British Columbia general election
Party	Candidate	Votes	%
Liberal	Ida Chong	12,911	47.80
New Democratic	Charley Beresford	11,430	42.31
Green	Stephen Hender	2,232	8.26
Democratic Reform	Lyne England	268	0.99
Independent	Lindsay Budge	171	0.63
Total		27,012	100.00

B.C. General Election 2001: Oak Bay-Gordon Head
Party	Candidate	Votes	%	±	Expenditures
Liberal	Ida Chong	14,588	57.31%		$40,994
NDP	Charley Beresford	5,789	22.74%		$30,917
Green	Christin Geall	4,666	18.33%	–	$4,291
Marijuana	Michael "Mik" Mann	411	1.62%		$583
Total Valid Votes		25,454	100.00%		
Total Rejected Ballots		93	0.37%		
Turnout		25,547	75.54%		

B.C. General Election 1996: Oak Bay-Gordon Head
Party	Candidate	Votes	%	±	Expenditures
Liberal	Ida Chong	12,340	46.59%		$52,261
NDP	Elizabeth Cull	11,700	44.17%		$45,690
Progressive Democrat	Gordon Henderson	937	3.54%	–	$305
Reform	Paul Yewchuk	675	2.55%		$11,324
Green	Lenora Burke	566	2.14%	–	$1,903
Family Coalition	Alan Idler	56	0.21%	–	$225
Social Credit	John van Dyk	48	0.18%	–	$3,796
Independent	John Ernest Currie	48	0.18%		$244
Natural Law	Gary Zak	47	0.18%		$165
Independent	Casey Edge	35	0.13%		$604
No Affiliation	Nicholas Varzeliotis	35	0.13%		$1,645
Total Valid Votes		26,487	100.00%		
Total Rejected Ballots		123	0.46%		
Turnout		26,610	79.49%		

B.C. General Election 1991: Oak Bay-Gordon Head
Party	Candidate	Votes	%	±	Expenditures
NDP	Elizabeth Cull	10,522	39.61%		$42,729
Liberal	Paul McKivett	9,685	36.46%		$11,068
Social Credit	Susan Brice	5,556	20.91%	–	$43,573
Reform	Terry Milne	604	2.27%		$7,043
Family Coalition	Kathleen Toth	157	0.59%	–	$539
Human Race	John Currie	42	0.16%		$8
Total Valid Votes		26,566	100.00%		
Total Rejected Ballots		422	1.56%		
Turnout		26,988	83.16%		

Oak Bay-Gordon Head Byelection, Dec. 13 1989
Party	Candidate	Votes	%	±	Expenditures
NDP	Elizabeth Cull	10,807	45.26%		
Social Credit	Susan Brice	10,430	43.68%	–	
Liberal	Paul McKivett	2,174	9.11%		
Green	Garth Lenz	328	1.37%	–	
Human Race Party	Louis Lesosky	20	0.08%		
Independent	Roland Isaacs	117	0.49%		
Total Valid Votes		23,876	100.00%		
Total Rejected Ballots		242	1.56%		
Eligible Voters		32,351			
Turnout			73.80%		

B.C. General Election 1986: Oak Bay-Gordon Head
Party	Candidate	Votes	%	±	Expenditures
Social Credit	Brian Smith	14,008	52.50%		
NDP	Muriel Agnes Overgaard	9,580	35.91%		
Progressive Conservative	Irvin Kimball Burbank	1,678	6.29%		
Liberal	Matthew Julian	635	2.38%		
Western Canada Concept	Tom Pappajohn	515	1.93%		
Independent	Ernest A. LeCours	201	0.75%		
Independent	Russel Ellsworth Downe	63	0.24%		
Total Valid Votes		26,680	100.00%		
Total Rejected Ballots		237			
Turnout		26,988	83.16%		

B.C. General Election 1979: Oak Bay-Gordon Head
Party	Candidate	Votes	%	±	Expenditures
Social Credit	Brian Smith	12,730	49.43%	–	
NDP	Muriel Agnes Overgaard	6,741	26.17%		
Progressive Conservative	Victor Albert Stephens	6,284	24.40%		
Total Valid Votes		24,755	100.00%		
Total Rejected Ballots		497			
Turnout					

== See also ==
- List of British Columbia provincial electoral districts
- Canadian provincial electoral districts
