= Saanich South =

Provincial electoral district in British Columbia, Canada

British Columbia electoral district
- Location in Greater Victoria

Provincial electoral district
- Legislature: Legislative Assembly of British Columbia
MLA
Cathie Ounsted
Conservative
- District created: 1990
- First contested: 1991
- Last contested: 2026

Demographics
- Population (2001): 49,585
- Area (km²): 82
- Pop. density (per km²): 604.7
- Census division: Greater Victoria
- Census subdivision: Saanich

Saanich South is a provincial electoral district for the Legislative Assembly of British Columbia, Canada. It was created by 1990 legislation dividing the previous two-member district of Saanich and the Islands which came into effect for the 1991 BC election. Between 1966 and 1991, the riding was dominated by Social Credit, who won every election except for 1972 when the riding was won by the British Columbia Progressive Conservative Party.

Since 1991, the riding had been won by the NDP in every election except for the BC Liberal landslide victory in 2001. This chain again broken in 2026 after the victory of the BC Conservative Party. During the 1990s, the riding was represented by prominent Cabinet minister, Andrew Petter, who served in the Harcourt, Clark, and Dosanjh governments.

== Demographics ==
Population	49,585
Population Change, 1996–2001	3.4%
Area (km^{2})	82
Pop. Density (people per km^{2})	604

== Geography ==
Saanich South covers the northern and western portions of the District of Saanich. Neighbourhoods within the electoral district include Cordova Bay, Prospect Lake, Royal Oak, Broadmead, Strawberry Vale, Glanford, North Quadra, and Blenkinsop Valley.

== Members of the Legislative Assembly ==
The MLA elect for Saanich South is Cathie Ounsted. She was first elected in 2026.

Saanich South
Assembly	Years	Member	Party
35th	1991–1996	Andrew Petter	New Democratic
36th	1996–2001	Andrew Petter	New Democratic
37th	2001–2005	Susan Brice	Liberal
38th	2005–2009	David Cubberley	New Democratic
39th	2009–2013	Lana Popham	New Democratic
40th	2013–2017	Lana Popham	New Democratic
41st	2017–2020	Lana Popham	New Democratic
42nd	2020–2024	Lana Popham	New Democratic
43rd	2024–2026	Lana Popham	New Democratic
44th	2026–present	Cathie Ounsted	Conservative

== Election results ==
2026 British Columbia general election
** Preliminary results — Not yet official **
Party	Candidate	Votes	%	±%
Conservative	Cathie Ounsted	10,549	39.28	+6.83
New Democratic	Richard Zussman	9,322	34.68	-15.05
Green	Lisa Lapointe	6,985	26.01	+8.22
Total valid votes		26,856	99.91	
Total rejected ballots		25	0.09	-0.05
Turnout		26,881		
Registered voters				
Conservative gain from New Democratic		Swing		+10.94
Source: Elections BC

2024 British Columbia general election
Party	Candidate	Votes	%	±%	Expenditures
New Democratic	Lana Popham	15,338	49.8%	-5.87	
Conservative	Adam Kubel	10,003	32.4%		
Green	Ned Taylor	5,485	17.8%	-2.31	
Total valid votes		30,826	–		
Total rejected ballots					
Turnout					
Registered voters					
Source: Elections BC

2020 British Columbia general election
Party	Candidate	Votes	%	±%	Expenditures
New Democratic	Lana Popham	15,190	55.67	+13.20	$32,127.82
Liberal	Rishi Sharma	6,608	24.22	−6.83	$37,039.98
Green	Kate O'Connor	5,488	20.11	−5.28	$14,020.41
Total valid votes		27,286	100.00	–	
Total rejected ballots		159	0.58	+0.13	
Turnout		27,445	65.12	−5.51	
Registered voters		42,148			
Source: Elections BC

2017 British Columbia general election
Party	Candidate	Votes	%	±%	Expenditures
New Democratic	Lana Popham	11,921	42.47	−3.08	$59,661
Liberal	David Calder	8,716	31.05	−4.24	$66,005
Green	Mark Neufeld	7,129	25.39	+10.10	$15,073
Libertarian	Andrew Paul McLean	177	0.63	–	$0
Vancouver Island Party	Richard Percival Pattee	130	0.46	–	$1,570
Total valid votes		28,073	100.00	–	
Total rejected ballots		126	0.45	+0.12	
Turnout		28,199	70.63	+3.52	
Registered voters		30,926			
Source: Elections BC

2013 British Columbia general election
Party	Candidate	Votes	%	±%	Expenditures
New Democratic	Lana Popham	11,946	45.55	-1.59	$104,395
Liberal	Rishi Sharma	9,256	35.29	-9.91	$64,424
Green	Branko Mustafovic	4,011	15.29	+8.58	$200
Conservative	Joshua Galbraith	873	3.33		$1,700
Independent	Peter Kappel	142	0.54		$910
Total valid votes		26,228	100.00		
Total rejected ballots		88	0.33		
Turnout		26,316	67.11		
Source: Elections BC

2009 British Columbia general election
Party	Candidate	Votes	%	±%	Expenditures
New Democratic	Lana Popham	11,697	47.14	+1.06	$93,914
Liberal	Robin Adair	11,215	45.20	+0.66	$121,866
Green	Brian Gordon	1,664	6.71	−0.55	$655
Western Canada Concept	Douglas Christie	235	0.95	+0.21	$250
Total valid votes		24,811	100		
Total rejected ballots		164	0.66		
Turnout		24,975	66.40		
Source: Elections BC

2005 British Columbia general election
Party	Candidate	Votes	%	±%
New Democratic	David Cubberley	12,809	46.08	+17.99
Liberal	Susan Brice	12,380	44.54	−7.63
Green	Brandon McIntyre	2,018	7.26	−8.44
Democratic Reform	Brett Hinch	223	0.80	–
Western Canada Concept	Douglas Christie	207	0.74	–
Independent	Kerry Steinemann	161	0.58	–
Total		27,798	100.00	
Total rejected ballots		170	0.61%	
Turnout		27,968	72.03%	
Source: Elections BC

2001 British Columbia general election
Party	Candidate	Votes	%	Expenditures
Liberal	Susan Brice	12,699	52.17%	$40,228
New Democratic	David Cubberley	6,838	28.09%	$38,619
Green	Gracie MacDonald	3,823	15.70%	$3,545
Marijuana	Tamara Tulloch	462	1.90%	$394
Conservative	Paul Scrimger	349	1.43%	$1,032
Independent	James Robert Lauder	172	0.71%	$608
Total valid votes		24,343	100.00%	
Total rejected ballots		66	0.27%	
Turnout		24,409	76.00%	
Source: Elections BC

1996 British Columbia general election
Party	Candidate	Votes	%	Expenditures
New Democratic	Andrew Petter	11,394	46.11	$46,181
Liberal	Frank Leonard	10,867	43.98	$42,352
Progressive Democrat	Cherie Dealey	1,198	4.85	$6,794
Reform	Colin Knecht	676	2.74	$2,842
Green	Jack Etkin	343	1.39	$1,081
Natural Law	Gail Anderson	86	0.35	$100
Western Canada Concept	Douglas Christie	66	0.27	$100
Libertarian	Ken Wiebe	40	0.16	–
Common Sense	Laery Braaten	38	0.15	$100
Total valid votes		24,708	100.00	
Total rejected ballots		141	0.57	
Turnout		24,849	77.16	

1991 British Columbia general election
Party	Candidate	Votes	%	Expenditures
New Democratic	Andrew Petter	10,254	44.63	$42,789
Liberal	Lorne Peasland	8,309	36.17	$7,035
Social Credit	Allen L. Vandekerkhove	4,218	18.36	$92,822
Western Canada Concept	Douglas Christie	193	0.84	–
Total valid votes		22,974	100.00	
Total rejected ballots		300	1.03	
Turnout		23,274	79.87	

== See also ==
- List of British Columbia provincial electoral districts
- Canadian provincial electoral districts
