= Running on Climate =

- Directed by: Robert Alstead
- Written by: Robert Alstead
- Produced by: Robert Alstead; Joanna Clarke
- Release date: May 2, 2015 (Canada)
- Running time: 80 minutes
- Country: Canada
- Language: English

Running On Climate is a feature documentary by Robert Alstead and Joanna Clarke of icycle.ca productions Ltd. The film focuses on the election campaign in 2013 of climate scientist Andrew J. Weaver as the first Green Party Member of the Legislative Assembly in British Columbia, Canada.

The film follows a chronological, diary narrative arc starting with Weaver's nomination and following through to his first speech to the Legislative Assembly in Victoria, British Columbia.

Interwoven with the story of Weaver's campaign are secondary parallel threads looking at how other scientists working in the field of climate and climate policy have undertaken acts of civil disobedience to protest government policy on coal, oil and natural gas expansion in the U.S.A. and Canada.

Running on Climate premiered at the DOXA Documentary Film Festival in Vancouver in May 2015.
