= Pamela Anne Ratner =

Canadian health scientist and academic administrator

Pamela Anne Ratner PhD, FCAHS
- Born: 1955 (age 70–71); Vancouver, British Columbia, Canada
- Education: University of Alberta (BSc, MN, PhD)
- Known for: Population health research and health outcomes measurement
- Spouse: Joy Johnson
- Awards: Fellow of the Canadian Academy of Health Sciences (FCAHS)
- Scientific career
- Fields: Nursing, public health, epidemiology
- Workplaces: University of British Columbia

Pamela Anne Ratner (born 1955) is a Canadian health scientist, nursing scholar, academic administrator, and professor emeritus at the University of British Columbia (UBC). Her research has focused on population health, epidemiology, health behaviour, psychometrics, and health outcomes measurement, particularly through the use of latent variable models and the study of cardiovascular health and health-related behaviour.

Ratner is known for research on intimate partner violence and women's health, including an early population-based study examining the prevalence of wife abuse and its association with mental health outcomes among women in Canada. In addition to her research career, she has held several senior academic leadership positions at UBC, including Senior Associate Dean in the Faculty of Education and Vice-Provost and Associate Vice-President, Faculty Planning. She was elected a Fellow of the Canadian Academy of Health Sciences in 2007.

== Early life and education ==
Ratner was born in Vancouver, British Columbia, in 1955. She received a nursing diploma from Vancouver General Hospital School of Nursing in 1979 and subsequently earned a Certificate in Critical Care Nursing (1984), a Bachelor of Science (Nursing) with distinction (1989), a Master of Nursing (1991), and a PhD in Nursing (1995) from the University of Alberta.

In 1992, she completed a Certificate in Epidemiology at Tufts University. Following completion of her doctorate, she undertook postdoctoral training at the University of British Columbia in epidemiology, health promotion, and preventive medicine from 1995 to 1998. She was the first nurse in Canada to receive a three-year Medical Research Council of Canada Fellowship for postdoctoral study.

== Academic career ==
Ratner joined the University of British Columbia in 1996 and was promoted to professor in 2004. During her academic career she served as Head pro tem of the Department of Educational Studies, Senior Associate Dean of the Faculty of Education, Vice-Provost and Associate Vice-President, International, pro tem, and Vice-Provost and Associate Vice-President, Faculty Planning.

She retired from UBC in 2023 and was subsequently appointed Professor Emeritus in the School of Nursing.

== Research and academic contributions ==
Ratner's research has spanned population health, epidemiology, health behaviour, psychometrics, health outcomes measurement, and health services research. Her early scholarship examined intimate partner violence and women's health, including a population-based study of women in Edmonton, Alberta, that explored the prevalence of physical and psychological abuse and its association with mental health outcomes. Her doctoral dissertation examined societal responses to wife abuse and their influence on health outcomes.

Over the course of her career, Ratner developed a programme of research focused on the application of epidemiologic and psychometric methods to the study of health behaviour, quality of life and patient-reported outcomes. She contributed to methodological work involving latent variable modelling and the longitudinal analysis of patient-reported outcomes.

Ratner also conducted research in cardiovascular health, including studies of symptom recognition, treatment-seeking behaviour, chronic disease outcomes, and patient-reported outcomes among individuals with cardiovascular disease. In addition, she collaborated on interdisciplinary studies addressing environmental and occupational health, health-services delivery, and quality-of-life outcomes.

Throughout her career, Ratner's research has integrated measurement science, health behaviour research, and population-health approaches.

== Leadership and governance roles ==
Ratner has held leadership and governance positions in academic, professional, health research, pension, and cultural organisations. She has served as a trustee of the UBC Faculty Pension Plan since 2021 and became chair of its Board of Trustees in 2026.

She was a governor of the Hamber Foundation from 2017 to 2024 and a director of the Great Northern Way Trust from 2018 to 2021.

Ratner served as chair of the Board of the College of Registered Nurses of British Columbia from 2010 to 2012. She was also a member of the Board of Directors of the Canadian Nurses Association from 2009 to 2011 and a member of the Institute Advisory Board of the Canadian Institutes of Health Research, Institute of Circulatory and Respiratory Health from 2008 to 2016, serving as vice‑chair and later chair.

In the cultural sector, Ratner joined the Board of Directors of Early Music Vancouver in 2022, served as vice‑president from 2023 to 2024 and became president and chair in 2025.

== Honours and recognition ==
In 2007, Ratner was elected a Fellow of the Canadian Academy of Health Sciences (CAHS).

== Personal life ==
Ratner is married to Joy Johnson, president of Simon Fraser University.
