= Richard Zussman =

Canadian television reporter (born 1983)

- Born: September 2, 1983 (age 43); Ottawa, Ontario
- Occupation: Journalist
- Political party: BC NDP

Richard Zussman (born September 2, 1983) is a former Canadian television reporter based in Victoria, British Columbia. He currently works as a Vice President, Public Affairs for Burson. He previously worked for Global BC as a journalist based at the Legislative Assembly of British Columbia. He was the Provincial Affairs reporter for CBC based at the BC legislature from 2014 to 2017. He was dismissed in early December 2017, for co-writing (with Rob Shaw) the book A Matter of Confidence about the fall of Christy Clark's British Columbia Liberal Party. He is a former TV personality on Citytv in Edmonton, where he served the political reporter/videographer for Breakfast Television and a former videojournalist and on-air pundit for the Sun News Network in Vancouver.

A member of the British Columbia New Democratic Party, he was the party's candidate for Saanich South in the 2026 British Columbia general election.

== Early career ==
Zussman was born and raised in Ottawa, Ontario, where he became interested in politics at a young age. He received his undergraduate degree in political studies from Queen's University in Kingston, Ontario in 2006. He went on to the Newhouse School of Public Communications at Syracuse University, where he completed his master's in Broadcast Journalism.

While at Syracuse, Zussman travelled to New Hampshire to cover the historic 2008 presidential primary for KUAR, an NPR radio station in Little Rock, Arkansas. He travelled with former Arkansas Governor Mike Huckabee on his campaign bus and reported on a group of Little Rock volunteers supporting Hillary Clinton who were left out in the cold after their hotel burned down.

In the summer of 2008, Zussman worked in Washington, D.C., as a television reporter for KTAL in Shreveport, Louisiana, covering the senate race between John Kennedy and incumbent Mary Landrieu. He also covered sports at WBNG-TV in New York.

Zussman joined Citytv Edmonton in November 2008.

Zussman moved to Vancouver in 2010, alongside his now wife Liza Yuzda. He worked at CityNews Vancouver and the Sun News Network before joining the CBC as a general assignment reporter. Zussman covered the 2011 Stanley Cup Final and the subsequent riot on Vancouver's streets.

== CBC Vancouver ==
Zussman joined the CBC on a part time basis before the 2013 British Columbia general election. He moved to the BC Legislature Legislative Assembly of British Columbia in 2014, taking over the Provincial Affairs report job full-time in 2015. Zussman led CBC Vancouver's coverage of the historic 2017 BC election. He was part of a team of journalists that won the Jack Webster Award for best radio breaking news for their coverage of the NDP-Green deal for a minority government. Zussman was the first to report the BC Greens had chosen the NDP to form government and the first to report John Horgan had been asked by Lieutenant Governor Judith Guichon Judith Guichon to take on role of Premier of British Columbia.

== Global BC ==
After his dismissal at the Canadian Broadcasting Corporation, Zussman joined news station Global BC. He joined the Legislative Bureau with Keith Baldrey in 2018.

During the COVID-19 pandemic, Zussman was one of the lead reporters for Global BC. He received the first question in a majority of Dr. Bonnie Henry's COVID-19 briefings and grew a significant following on Twitter (now X) for his COVID-19 updates. Zussman also help lead the station's coverage of the 2020 British Columbia general election.

In 20 September 2019, during a panel to discuss former Canadian Prime Minister Justin Trudeau's previous use of blackface in 2001, a reporter was allegedly heard making a blackface joke during a microphone check. This was overheard by Mo Dhaliwal, a Vancouver marketing strategist and anti-racism advocate who was a member of the panel. Global BC soon after apologized for the comment and took disciplinary action against the reporter. In 2026, that reporter was said to be Zussman.

During his time at Global BC, Zussman won multiple Jack Webster Awards, one in 2018 for Best Breaking News for his coverage of the 2018 British Columbia wildfires, and again in 2024 for Best News Reporting of the Year – TV/Video for his coverage of the 2023 Canadian wildfires.

== Community work ==
Zussman is an avid curler and is currently serving on the Board of Directors at the Victoria Curling Club Victoria Curling Club. His team, alongside Paul Cseke, Jay Wakefield and Adam Cseke, lost in the final of the 2026 Island Shootout. He was part of the board while the club raised the funds necessary to purchase a new ice-plant.

He currently serves of the board of Lakehill Baseball and Fastball in Saanich.

In December 2018, Zussman served as Lieutenant Governor of the 90th Session of the British Columbia Youth Parliament, a non-profit, non-denominational youth-run organization that combines education about the Westminster system of Parliament with the promotion of youth service in the community.

During the COVID-19 pandemic in British Columbia, Zussman's daughter Bailey and son Eli drew pictures that were displayed on television during live hits. Global BC viewers donated more than $3,000 to Food Banks across British Columbia after purchasing the drawings.

== Political career ==
In September 2026, Zussman announced that he would seek the British Columbia New Democratic Party candidacy in Saanich South in the 2026 British Columbia general election. He placed second in the election.

== Electoral record ==
2026 British Columbia general election: Saanich South
** Preliminary results — Not yet official **
Party	Candidate	Votes	%	±%
Conservative	Cathie Ounsted	10,549	39.28	+6.83
New Democratic	Richard Zussman	9,322	34.68	-15.05
Green	Lisa Lapointe	6,985	26.01	+8.22
Total valid votes		26,856	99.91	
Total rejected ballots		25	0.09	-0.05
Turnout		26,881		
Registered voters				
Conservative gain from New Democratic		Swing		+10.94
Source: Elections BC
