= David Cubberley =

Canadian politician

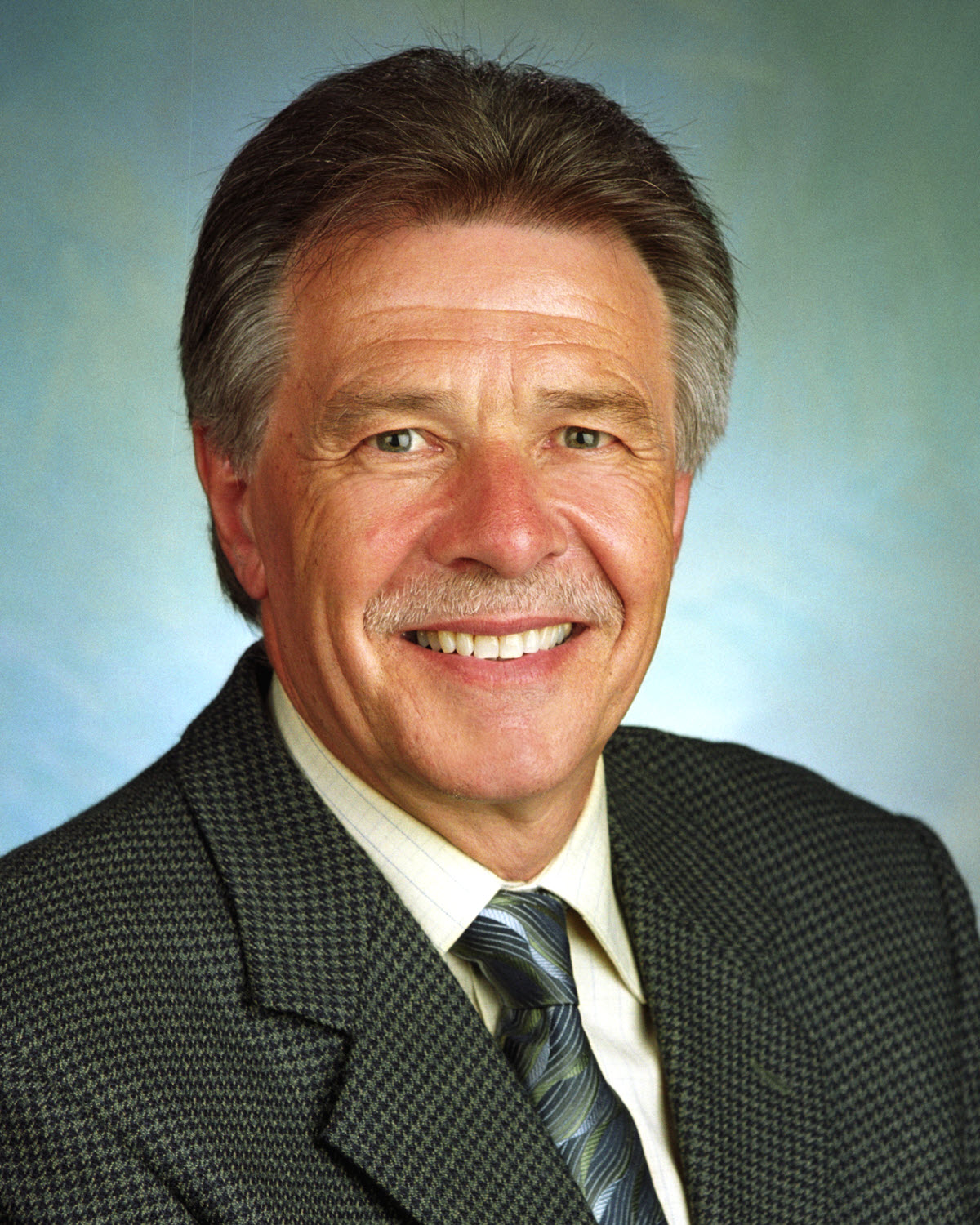

MLA for Saanich South
- In office 2005–2009
- Preceded by: Susan Brice
- Succeeded by: Lana Popham

Councillor, District of Saanich
- In office 1996–2005

Councillor, District of Saanich
- In office 1990–1993

Personal details
- Born: 1947 (age 78–79)
- Party: New Democrat
- Spouse: Susan Vasilev

David Cubberley is a Canadian politician, active in municipal, regional and provincial issues since 1990. He is an advocate of cycling trail networks for commuters and recreation, protection of farmland, sustainable transportation, and advocacy for chronic Lyme disease.

== Career ==
David Cubberley's political career began in 1990 as a Saanich councillor. He was elected to Saanich Council four times between 1990 and 2002 and chaired the Saanich finance committee for the last five years. While on council Cubberley chaired the Bicycle Advisory Committee and task forces on Lochside Drive, West Saanich Road Streetscape and Monster Houses. He was also the originator of Saanich's Centennial Trails project, created to mark Saanich's 100th birthday in 2006.

In 2002 Cubberley was elected to the Capital Regional District board, where he chaired the Environment Committee for two years. He also served as CRD Water Commissioner and on the Regional Planning Committee.

In 2005 Cubberley was elected as the MLA for the riding of Saanich South, representing the BC NDP, defeating one-term incumbent Susan Brice of the BC Liberals. He served as the Opposition Critic for Health and later as Critic for Education. As Deputy Chair of the Standing Committee on Health, he helped produce a report on prevention of childhood obesity and physical inactivity. Cubberley retired from provincial politics in 2009.

In 2011, David Cubberley ran for Mayor of Saanich against incumbent Frank Leonard. Local news dubbed Cubberley the strongest challenger for the mayor's chair Leonard faced in 15 years. The election was held Saturday, November 19, 2011, with Leonard garnering 53.48% of the vote and Cubberley 45.69%. Only one in four eligible Saanich voters cast their ballots, a slight increase from 2008 turnout of 20.6%.
