= Susan Brice =

Canadian politician

Saanich District Councillor
- Incumbent
- Assumed office 2005

Member of the British Columbia Legislative Assembly for Saanich South
- In office May 16, 2001 – May 17, 2005
- Preceded by: Andrew Petter
- Succeeded by: David Cubberley

Minister of Human Resources of British Columbia
- In office September 20, 2004 – June 16, 2005
- Premier: Gordon Campbell
- Preceded by: Stan Hagen
- Succeeded by: Position abolished

Minister of State for Mental Health and Addiction Services of British Columbia
- In office January 26, 2004 – September 20, 2004
- Premier: Gordon Campbell
- Preceded by: Gulzar Cheema (Minister of State for Mental Health)
- Succeeded by: Brenda Locke

Mayor of Oak Bay
- In office 1985–1990
- Preceded by: J. Douglas Watts
- Succeeded by: Diana Butler

Personal details
- Born: July 7, 1943 (age 83) Victoria, British Columbia, Canada
- Party: BC Liberal
- Other political affiliations: BC Social Credit (ca. 1989-1991)
- Spouse: George Brice (m. 1965)

Susan Brice (born July 7, 1943) is a Canadian politician who represented the electoral district of Saanich South in the Legislative Assembly of British Columbia from 2001 to 2005. She sat as a member of the BC Liberal Party, and served in the cabinet of Premier Gordon Campbell. She has served as a member of the Saanich District Council since 2005, and was previously mayor and councillor in Oak Bay.

== Biography ==
Born and raised in Victoria, British Columbia, she attended the University of Victoria and worked as an elementary school teacher in Esquimalt and Oak Bay. She served as an elected trustee to the Greater Victoria School Board from 1975 to 1980, including as chair of the board from 1978 to 1979. She was elected councillor to the Municipality of Oak Bay in 1980, then served as mayor from 1985 to 1990. She represented Oak Bay as a director on the Capital Regional District board during that time, and chaired the board from 1988 to 1989.

She ran as a candidate for the Social Credit Party in a 1989 by-election for the provincial riding of Oak Bay-Gordon Head, but lost to New Democrat Elizabeth Cull by 377 votes. She contested the riding again at the 1991 provincial election, this time placing third behind Cull and Liberal Paul McKivett. She was a host on CFAX AM1070 from 1990 to 1992, then became executive director of the Better Business Bureau of Vancouver Island.

She represented the BC Liberals in the riding of Saanich South at the 2001 provincial election, and defeated New Democrat David Cubberley to become member of the Legislative Assembly (MLA). She was appointed to the cabinet in January 2004 as Minister of State for Mental Health and Addiction Services, before being re-assigned as Minister of Human Resources that September. She was also a member of the Government Caucus Committee on Education, and chair of the Government Caucus Committee on Health.

After losing re-election as MLA in 2005 by 429 votes against Cubberley, Brice instead ran for Saanich District Council at that year's municipal election, and has served as councillor since then.

She has been married to husband George since 1965; they have two sons together.

== Electoral record ==
2001 British Columbia general election: Saanich South
Party	Candidate	Votes	%	Expenditures
Liberal	Susan Brice	12,699	52.17%	$40,228
New Democratic	David Cubberley	6,838	28.09%	$38,619
Green	Gracie MacDonald	3,823	15.70%	$3,545
Marijuana	Tamara Tulloch	462	1.90%	$394
Conservative	Paul Scrimger	349	1.43%	$1,032
Independent	James Robert Lauder	172	0.71%	$608
Total valid votes		24,343	100.00%	
Total rejected ballots		66	0.27%	
Turnout		24,409	76.00%	
Source: Elections BC

2005 British Columbia general election: Saanich South
Party	Candidate	Votes	%	±%
New Democratic	David Cubberley	12,809	46.08	+17.99
Liberal	Susan Brice	12,380	44.54	−7.63
Green	Brandon McIntyre	2,018	7.26	−8.44
Democratic Reform	Brett Hinch	223	0.80	–
Western Canada Concept	Douglas Christie	207	0.74	–
Independent	Kerry Steinemann	161	0.58	–
Total		27,798	100.00	
Total rejected ballots		170	0.61%	
Turnout		27,968	72.03%	
Source: Elections BC
