= Lana Popham =

Canadian politician (born 1968)

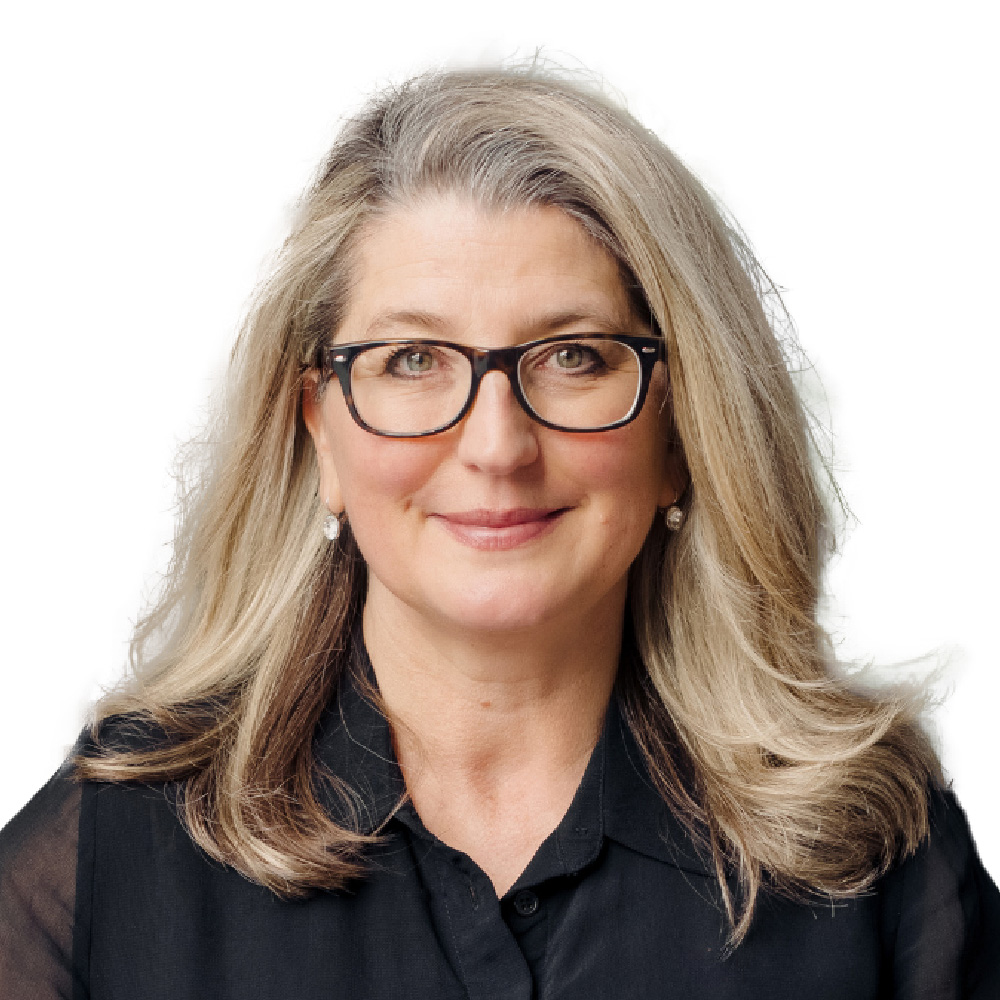
- Campaign portrait, 2024

Minister of Agriculture and Food of British Columbia Minister of Agriculture, Food and Fisheries (2017-2022)
- In office November 18, 2024 – November 20, 2026
- Premier: David Eby
- Preceded by: Pam Alexis
- Succeeded by: Ian Paton
- In office July 18, 2017 – December 7, 2022
- Premier: John Horgan; David Eby
- Preceded by: Norm Letnick
- Succeeded by: Pam Alexis

Minister of Tourism, Arts, Culture and Sport of British Columbia
- In office December 7, 2022 – November 18, 2024
- Premier: David Eby
- Preceded by: Lisa Beare
- Succeeded by: Spencer Chandra Herbert

Member of the British Columbia Legislative Assembly for Saanich South
- In office May 12, 2009 – October 24, 2026
- Preceded by: David Cubberley
- Succeeded by: Cathie Ounsted

Personal details
- Born: October 30, 1968 (age 58) Regina, Saskatchewan
- Party: New Democrat
- Children: Kye Popham
- Education: University of British Columbia
- Occupation: farmer, small business owner

Lana Popham is a Canadian politician who represented the riding of Saanich South in the Legislature of British Columbia from 2009 to 2026. A member of the British Columbia New Democratic Party (BC NDP), she served in the Executive Council from 2017 to 2026. She was first elected in the 2009 provincial general election to the 39th Parliament and then re-elected in 2013, 2017, 2020 and 2024 British Columbia general election to the 40th, 41st, 42nd and 43rd Parliaments.

As the Minister of Agriculture, Food and Fisheries from 2017 to 2022, she led the adoption of two bills, both of which amended the Agricultural Land Commission Act (Bills 15 and 52), and an order-in-council that began the phasing out of mink farming.

While in opposition, she served predominantly as the critic on agricultural issues and introduced two private members' bills: the British Columbia Local Food Act and the Prevention of Cruelty to Animals (Mink Farms) Amendment Act. Prior to her election, Popham owned and operated the organic grape orchard, Barking Dog Vineyard, on Vancouver Island.

== Background ==
Born in Regina, Saskatchewan, Lana Popham was raised on Quadra Island, one of the Discovery Islands off the central-east coast of Vancouver Island. She graduated from the University of British Columbia with a Bachelor of Arts in geography. She married an Oak Bay firefighter and together they had a son. In 1997 they founded Barking Dog Vineyard, which became the first certified organic vineyard on Vancouver Island in 2000.

She has participated in numerous organizations, including the Island Organic Producers Association and the Peninsula Agricultural Commission, at one point serving as president of the Vancouver Island Grape Growers Association. She has been a member of several District of Saanich committees, including planning, transportation, and economic development committees. In 2007 she engaged in the "100 km Less" campaign, challenging people to eliminate 100 kilometres from their weekly driving. In 2008 she campaigned to reduce or ban plastic shopping bags in the Capital Regional District, in favour of reusable bags.

Popham was a candidate in the 2005 Saanich municipal election, but did not win a seat on council. She began campaigning for the 2008 municipal election but withdrew to run for the provincial NDP nomination in the Saanich South riding. The riding's Member of the Legislative Assembly (MLA), New Democrat David Cubberley, had announced he would not run in the next election and party rules required that his successor be female. Being unopposed, Popham was acclaimed the NDP candidate in Saanich South for the 2009 provincial general election.

The Saanich South election was expected to be one of the closest in the province, with Popham facing former CHEK-TV reporter and news anchor and BC Liberal candidate Robin Adair, lawyer and Western Canada Concept Party leader Doug Christie, and Green Party candidate Brian Gordon. Popham was one of four candidates in the province endorsed by the Conservation Voters of BC. Popham won the May 12, 2009 election by 482 votes and her party formed the official opposition.

== Member of the Legislative Assembly ==
=== 39th Parliament ===
In the 39th Parliament she served as a member on the Select Standing Committee on Public Accounts and was the NDP agriculture and lands critic. To understand provincial agricultural issues better, Popham and Cariboo North MLA Bob Simpson toured the BC Interior during the summer of 2009, where they met with agricultural organizations and local producers. She joined with fellow NDP MLAs Scott Fraser and Claire Trevena, in conjunction with the Western Canada Wilderness Committee, in lobbying for the stop to old-growth logging on Vancouver Island and the Lower Mainland.

In August 2011, while Popham was out of town, her constituency office experienced a roof fire. In November 2010, Popham became one of 13 NDP caucus members to call for a leadership review of Carole James. Popham endorsed Mike Farnworth in the subsequent leadership election, which saw Adrian Dix come out on top. Under Dix, Popham remained agriculture critic and they advocated for health authorities to use local food in hospitals, reinstating the Buy B.C. program, easing the regulations that restrict meat processing sales, and lobbied the Province of Ontario for compatible labeling laws in support of a proposed federal law that would allow inter-provincial sales of wine.

Popham was featured in the 2011 Canadian documentary film Peace Out, in which she spoke about the food supply ramifications of flooding the Peace River Valley for the controversial John Horgan Dam proposal.

Popham's public position on agricultural issues include reinstating the Buy B.C. program, making it more difficult to remove land from the Agricultural Land reserve and reinstating agricultural extension officers. Popham opposes the commercial production of the genetically engineered Arctic Apple, arguing it could negatively affect the reputation of BC fruit. She is a leading proponent of increased protection for native pollinators and honey bees on Vancouver Island, maintaining a blog on the subject.

Popham delivered an overview of the BCNDP's agriculture plan on March 4 and 5, 2013 to the BC Legislature.

=== 40th Parliament ===
Popham contested the May 14, 2013 provincial election and was re-elected. However, her party lost the general election and again formed the official opposition. Party leader Adrian Dix appointed Popham to a critic role focusing on small business, tourism, arts and culture. In the leadership election triggered by Dix's resignation, Popham again endorsed Mike Farnworth. However, Farnworth withdrew his nomination and John Horgan went on to become leader. Horgan reassigned Popham back to critic on agriculture and food, though he would later add critic role for small business back to her duties.

During the 40th Parliament of British Columbia, Popham introduced two private member bills, neither of which advanced beyond first reading. In May 2015 during the fourth session, and again in May 2016 during the fifth session, she introduced the British Columbia Local Food Act (Bill M 222) which would establish a Food and Agricultural Committee in the legislative assembly, require the committee to establish a Local Food Strategy and make recommendation for appointments to the Agricultural Land Commission, move the Zone 2 areas of the Agricultural Land Reserve into Zone 1, and re-establish the Ministry of Agriculture's Buy BC marketing program. In May 2016, Popham introduced the Prevention of Cruelty to Animals (Mink Farms) Amendment Act (Bill M 237) which would have implemented the National Farm Animal Care Council's code of practice for farmed mink.

=== 41st Parliament ===
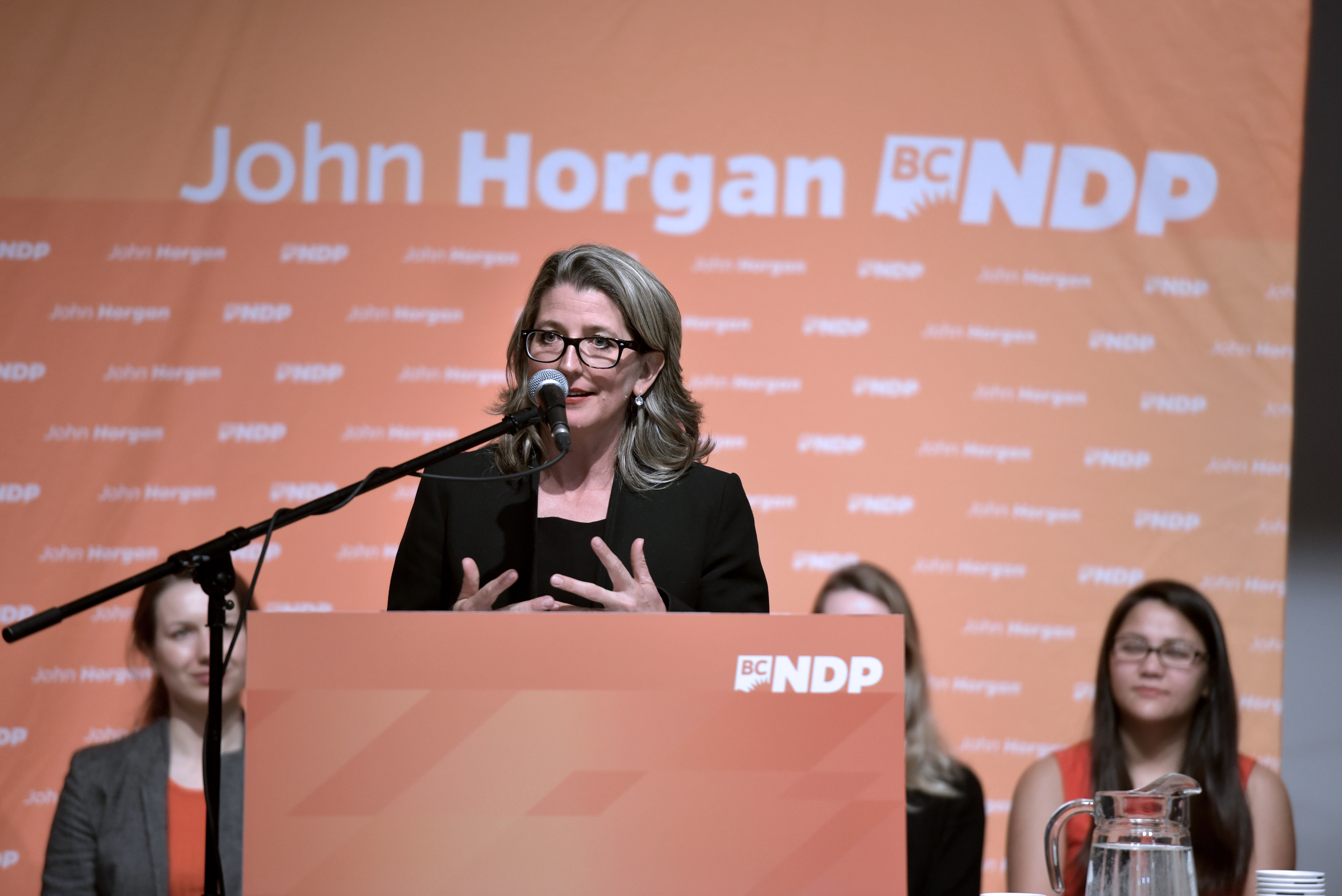
Lana Popham speaking at her nomination rally in 2017

In the 2017 election, she was challenged by Olympic rower Dave Calder on behalf of the BC Liberal Party, her son's former teacher Mark Neufeld for the Green Party, Andrew McLean for the Libertarian Party, and Richard Pattee for the newly created Vancouver Island Party. Though Popham won the riding, her party again formed the official opposition as the 41st Parliament began. After the governing BC Liberal Party lost a confidence vote and the BC NDP formed the government, Popham was appointed to be Minister of Agriculture in Premier John Horgan's Executive Council. In this role, Popham oversaw the implementation of BC NDP's agricultural platform of reforming the Agricultural Land Commission and developing the Grow BC, Feed BC and Buy BC initiatives. She introduced the Agricultural Land Commission Amendment Act, 2018 (Bill 52) and the Agricultural Land Commission Amendment Act, 2019 (Bill 15) which, among other items, undid the previous parliament's division of the Agricultural Land Reserve into two zones with different regulations and reduced the amount of housing permitted on agricultural land.

=== 42nd Parliament ===
Popham was re-elected in the 2020 election. Her NDP formed a majority government in the ensuing 42nd Parliament and Premier Horgan kept Popham in the Executive Council, but renamed her role to Minister of Agriculture, Food and Fisheries. In that role she issued an Order in Council to allow for new housing to be constructed on lands within the Agricultural Land Reserve and to phase-out mink farming.

She was reassigned as Minister of Tourism, Arts, Culture and Sport by Premier David Eby on December 7, 2022.

== Electoral history ==
2024 British Columbia general election: Saanich South
Party	Candidate	Votes	%	±%	Expenditures
New Democratic	Lana Popham	15,338	49.8%	-5.87	
Conservative	Adam Kubel	10,003	32.4%		
Green	Ned Taylor	5,485	17.8%	-2.31	
Total valid votes		30,826	–		
Total rejected ballots					
Turnout					
Registered voters					
Source: Elections BC

2020 British Columbia general election: Saanich South
Party	Candidate	Votes	%	±%	Expenditures
New Democratic	Lana Popham	15,190	55.67	+13.20	$32,127.82
Liberal	Rishi Sharma	6,608	24.22	−6.83	$37,039.98
Green	Kate O'Connor	5,488	20.11	−5.28	$14,020.41
Total valid votes		27,286	100.00	–	
Total rejected ballots		159	0.58	+0.13	
Turnout		27,445	65.12	−5.51	
Registered voters		42,148			
Source: Elections BC

2017 British Columbia general election: Saanich South
Party	Candidate	Votes	%	±%	Expenditures
New Democratic	Lana Popham	11,921	42.47	−3.08	$59,661
Liberal	David Calder	8,716	31.05	−4.24	$66,005
Green	Mark Neufeld	7,129	25.39	+10.10	$15,073
Libertarian	Andrew Paul McLean	177	0.63	–	$0
Vancouver Island Party	Richard Percival Pattee	130	0.46	–	$1,570
Total valid votes		28,073	100.00	–	
Total rejected ballots		126	0.45	+0.12	
Turnout		28,199	70.63	+3.52	
Registered voters		30,926			
Source: Elections BC

2013 British Columbia general election: Saanich South
Party	Candidate	Votes	%	±%	Expenditures
New Democratic	Lana Popham	11,946	45.55	-1.59	$104,395
Liberal	Rishi Sharma	9,256	35.29	-9.91	$64,424
Green	Branko Mustafovic	4,011	15.29	+8.58	$200
Conservative	Joshua Galbraith	873	3.33		$1,700
Independent	Peter Kappel	142	0.54		$910
Total valid votes		26,228	100.00		
Total rejected ballots		88	0.33		
Turnout		26,316	67.11		
Source: Elections BC

2009 British Columbia general election: Saanich South
Party	Candidate	Votes	%	±%	Expenditures
New Democratic	Lana Popham	11,697	47.14	+1.06	$93,914
Liberal	Robin Adair	11,215	45.20	+0.66	$121,866
Green	Brian Gordon	1,664	6.71	−0.55	$655
Western Canada Concept	Douglas Christie	235	0.95	+0.21	$250
Total valid votes		24,811	100		
Total rejected ballots		164	0.66		
Turnout		24,975	66.40		
Source: Elections BC

British Columbia provincial government of David Eby
Cabinet posts (2)
Predecessor	Office	Successor
Lisa Beare	Minister of Tourism, Arts, Culture and Sport; December 7, 2022 –	Incumbent
cont'd from Horgan Ministry	Minister of Agriculture, Food and Fisheries; November 18, 2022 – December 7, 2022	Pam Alexis
British Columbia provincial government of John Horgan
Cabinet post (1)
Predecessor	Office	Successor
Norm Letnick	Minister of Agriculture, Food and Fisheries; July 18, 2017 – November 18, 2022	cont'd into Eby Ministry
