= Cathie Ounsted =

Canadian politician

The Honourable Cathie Ounsted MLA

Minister of Local Government, Housing, Sport and Culture
- Incumbent
- Assumed office November 20, 2026
- Preceded by: Office established

Member of the British Columbia Legislative Assembly for Saanich South
- Incumbent
- Assumed office October 24, 2026
- Preceded by: Lana Popham

Personal details
- Party: Conservative (provincial)
- Other political affiliations: Conservative (federal)
- Website: website

Cathie Ounsted MLA is a Canadian politician who was elected the member of the British Columbia Legislative Assembly for Saanich South at the 2026 British Columbia general election. At the 2025 Canadian federal election, she was the Conservative Party of Canada candidate for Saanich—Gulf Islands, but was not elected.

Ounsted was previously an appointed member of the Central Saanich Police Board as well as an elected councillor for the Central Saanich Council. She was also a Director of Operations for Thrifty Foods and a reserve constable for the Victoria Police Department.

== Electoral record ==
=== Federal elections ===
2025 Canadian federal election: Saanich—Gulf Islands
Party	Candidate	Votes	%	±%	Expenditures
Green	Elizabeth May	31,199	39.10	+3.33	$141,917.72
Liberal	David Beckham	25,409	31.85	+13.04	$102,877.53
Conservative	Cathie Ounsted	20,015	25.09	+2.44	$142,555.14
New Democratic	Colin Plant	3,163	3.96	–15.59	$46,746.99
Total valid votes/expense limit		79,786	99.58	–	$147,255.57
Total rejected ballots		336	0.42	–0.15	
Turnout		80,122	77.87	+7.99	
Eligible voters		102,890			
Green notional hold		Swing		–4.86	
Source: Elections Canada

=== Provincial elections ===
2026 British Columbia general election: Saanich South
** Preliminary results — Not yet official **
Party	Candidate	Votes	%	±%
Conservative	Cathie Ounsted	11,393	39.01	
New Democratic	Richard Zussman	10,160	34.78	
Green	Lisa Lapointe	7,624	26.10	
Total valid votes		29,177	99.89	
Total rejected ballots		31	0.11	
Turnout		29,208		
Registered voters				
Conservative gain from New Democratic		Swing		+10.94
Source: Elections BC
