= Joy Johnson (university administrator) =

University administrator

Joy L. Johnson
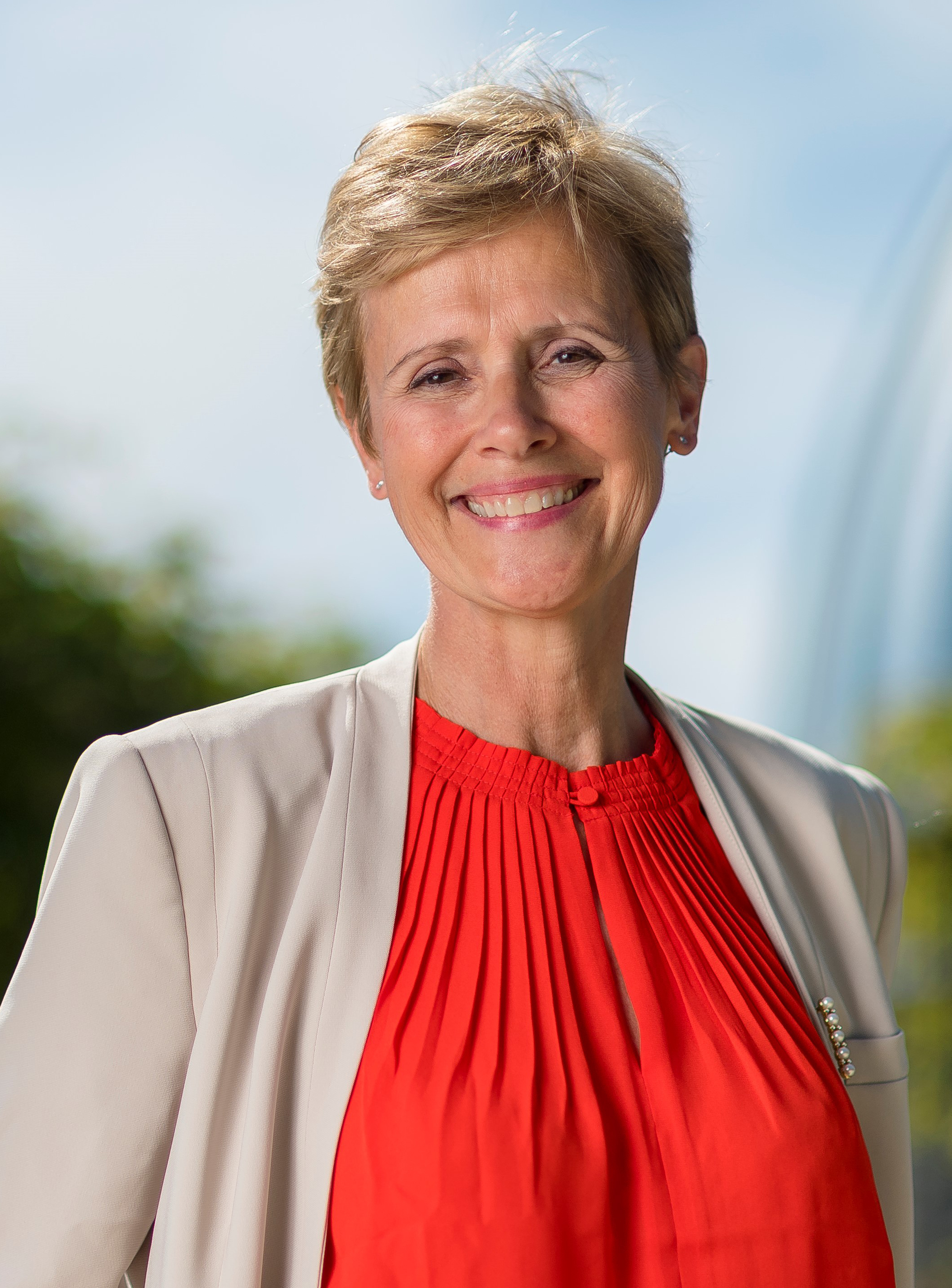
- Johnson in 2019
- Born: 1960 (age 65–66); Spalding, Saskatchewan
- Occupation: Academic administration
- Title: 10th President and Vice-Chancellor of Simon Fraser University
- Predecessor: Andrew Petter
- Spouse: Pamela Anne Ratner

Academic background
- Education: University of Alberta (PhD, MN); University of British Columbia (BSN)
- Thesis: The process of adjustment following myocardial infarction (1988)

Academic work
- Discipline: Nursing
- Institutions: University of British Columbia; Simon Fraser University

Joy Louise Johnson FRSC FCAHS is the 10th president and vice-chancellor of Simon Fraser University in Burnaby, British Columbia, Canada. A health scientist and researcher in gender and health, she became the first woman to be appointed Vice-President Research at Simon Fraser in 2014.

== Academic work and life ==
Johnson graduated with a Ph.D. degree in Nursing from the University of Alberta in 1993. She worked as a nurse at St. Paul's Hospital and other facilities before returning to graduate school.

From 2003 to 2007, she was the University of British Columbia (UBC) Unit Director, Centre for Addictions Research of BC. From 2008 to 2014, she was the Scientific Director for the Institute of Gender and Health of the Canadian Institutes of Health Research. Johnson held a professorship in the University of British Columbia, School of Nursing, with a focus on health promotion and health behaviour change. Johnson served on the boards of the Women's Health Research Institute, the Michael Smith Foundation for Health Research, and Innovate BC. She currently serves on the Board of Directors for Universities Canada.

In 2014, she became Simon Fraser University's first female Vice President of Research, succeeding Mario Pinto. In 2020, she was appointed to succeed Andrew Petter as President of the university. In 2024, she was reappointed for another five-year term as President.

In May 2026, Johnson was named an inductee into the BC Innovators Hall of Fame by BC Tech, in recognition of her contributions to British Columbia’s technology and innovation ecosystem.

== Research program ==
Johnson’s research program is geared toward promoting health and modifying health-related behaviour. In particular, women and men exhibit different health behaviours and react differently to drugs and other therapies. Medical devices or other equipment physically fit the sexes differently. Ignoring these differences compromises treatment quality.

One reason for ignoring sex differences in drug therapies, for example, is the standard of controlling for extraneous variables such as hormones. This is done in order to attribute health changes to the drug being tested. Because female hormones fluctuate more than do males’, experiments typically use male subjects. This results in comparatively little data about how women respond to the same drug therapies, which compromises women’s health.

== SFU football controversy ==
On April 4, 2023, Johnson presided over the shutdown of the SFU football program. Johnson cited “ongoing uncertainty” for the cancellation for the program. At the time, SFU had a complete roster, coaching staff and a 2023 schedule to play their final season in the Lone Star Conference (LSC). The Texas-based LSC chose not to renew its affiliation with SFU.

SFU had engaged Bob Copeland from McLaren Global Sports Solutions to assess and evaluate possible directions for the football program. In his report, Copeland concluded that the university had no viable path to participate in the NCAA or compete in the United States. He also noted that rejoining U Sports — the governing body for Canadian university athletics — would involve significant costs and offered no assurance of success.

The result of the decision to cancel the program resulted in 76 returning players and 14 signed recruits losing roster spots for the 2023 season. The move to cancel the program has been criticized for its negative impact on student-athletes and lack of transparency in consultation with stakeholders and the university community. In response to the cancellation, an injunction against the university was filed in the BC Supreme Court by five affected football players. The injunction was rejected on the grounds that the plaintiffs "failed to satisfy the legal requirements under governing case authorities."

== Recognition ==
- 2006 – UBC Killam Research Award which are awarded annually to top campus researchers in recognition of outstanding research and scholarly contributions of international significance
- 2010 – Named one of The Vancouver Sun's BC's 100 Women of Influence for her work in health behaviour
- 2012 – Queen Elizabeth II Diamond Jubilee Medal
- 2019 – Fellow of the Royal Society of Canada
- Fellow of the Canadian Academy of Health Sciences

== Selected publications ==
- Haines-Saah, R. J., Johnson, J. L., Repta, R., & Ostry, A. (2014). The privileged normalization of marijuana use – an analysis of Canadian newspaper reporting, 1997–2007. Critical Public Health, 24(1), 47–61. doi:10.1080/09581596.2013.771812
- Maggi, S., Lovato, C. Y., Hill, E. M., & Johnson, J. L. (2014). Adolescents’ Perceptions of Parental Influences on Their Smoking Behavior: A Content Analysis. Youth and Society, 46(1), 132.
- Moffat, B. M., Jenkins, E. K., & Johnson, J. L. (2013). Weeding out the information: an ethnographic approach to exploring how young people make sense of the evidence on cannabis. Harm Reduction Journal, 10(1), 34.
- Tarlier, D. S., Johnson, J. L., Browne, A. J., & Sheps, S. (2013). Maternal-Infant Health Outcomes and Nursing Practice in a Remote First Nations Community in Northern Canada. Canadian Journal of Nursing Research, 45(2), 1.
- Bottorff, J. L., Oliffe, J. L., Kelly, M. T., & Johnson, J. L. (2013). Reconciling Parenting and Smoking in the Context of Child Development. Qualitative Health Research, 23(8), 1042.
- Johnson, J. L. (1996). A dialectical analysis concerning the rational aspect of the art of nursing. Image: The Journal of Nursing Scholarship, 28, 169-175.
- Johnson, J. L. (1996). The perceptual aspect of nursing art: Sources of accord and discord. Scholarly Inquiry for Nursing Practice, 10, 307-322.
- Johnson, J. L., Green, L. W., Frankish, C. J., Maclean, D. R., & Stachenko, S. (1996). A dissemination research agenda to strengthen health promotion and disease prevention. Canadian Journal of Public Health, 87(supp. 2), S5-S10.
- Johnson, J. L., Ratner, P. A., & Bottorff, J. L. (1995). Urban-rural differences in the health-promoting behaviours of Albertans. Canadian Journal of Public Health, 86, 103-108.
- Johnson, J. L., & Morse, J. M. (1990). Regaining control: The process of adjustment after myocardial infarction. Heart and Lung, 19, 126-135.
- Johnson, J. L. (1991). Nursing science: Basic, applied or practical? Implications for the art of nursing. Advances in Nursing Science, 14(1), 7-16. [Reprinted in: Johnson, J. L. (1996). Nursing science: Basic, applied or practical? Implications for the art of nursing. In J. W. Kenney (Ed.), Philosophical and theoretical perspectives for advanced nursing practice (pp. 101–109). Sudbury, MA: Jones and Bartlett
- Johnson, J. L., Ratner, P. A., Bottorff, J. L., & Hayduk, L. A. (1993). An exploration of Pender's Health Promotion Model using LISREL. Nursing Research, 42, 132-128.
- Johnson, J. L., Budz, B., Mackay, M., & Miller, C. (1999). Evaluation of a nurse-delivered smoking cessation intervention for hospitalized cardiac patients. Heart and Lung, 28, 55-64.
- Johnson, J. L., Bottorff, J. L., Balneaves, L., Grewal, S., Bhagat, R., Hilton B. A., & Clarke, H. (1999). South Asian women’s views on the causes of breast cancer: Images and explanations. Patient Education and Counseling, 37, 243-254.
