= Andrew Weaver =

Canadian scientist and politician

Andrew J. Weaver
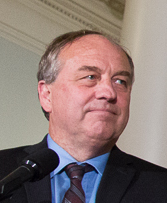

Leader of the Green Party of British Columbia
- In office 9 December 2015 – 6 January 2020
- Deputy: Adam Olsen; Sonia Furstenau; Jonina Campbell
- Preceded by: Adam Olsen (interim)
- Succeeded by: Adam Olsen (interim)

Member of the British Columbia Legislative Assembly for Oak Bay-Gordon Head
- In office 14 May 2013 – 24 November 2020
- Preceded by: Ida Chong
- Succeeded by: Murray Rankin

Personal details
- Born: 1961 (age 64–65) Victoria, British Columbia, Canada
- Party: CentreBC (2026–present)
- Other political affiliations: Green (2012–2020) Independent (2020–2026) Liberal (federal)
- Education: BSc University of Victoria, PhD University of British Columbia
- Occupation: Climate scientist; Former politician

Andrew John Weaver OBC is a Canadian scientist and politician who represented the riding of Oak Bay-Gordon Head from 2013 to 2020 in the Legislative Assembly of British Columbia. Weaver also served as the leader of the Green Party of British Columbia from 2015 to 2020. After leaving the Green caucus in January 2020, he continued to sit as an independent member. He did not run for reelection in the 2020 election.

== Academics ==
Weaver was born in Victoria, British Columbia, and graduated from Oak Bay High School in 1979.

He received a BSc in mathematics and physics from the University of Victoria in 1983, a Certificate of Advanced Study in mathematics (Master of Advanced Study) from the University of Cambridge in 1984, and a PhD in applied mathematics from the University of British Columbia in 1987.

After finishing his PhD, Weaver worked as a postdoctoral fellow in the School of Mathematics at the University of New South Wales in Australia in 1988, and in the Joint Institute for the Study of the Atmosphere and Ocean at the University of Washington in Seattle in 1989. Prior to joining the University of Victoria in 1992, he spent three years as an assistant professor in the department of Atmospheric and Oceanic Sciences at McGill University. Weaver is a professor and, prior to his election to the BC Legislature, was the Canada Research Chair in climate modelling and analysis in the School of Earth and Ocean Sciences at the University of Victoria, where he has worked for 34 years. He was the Lansdowne Professor until 2017.

Weaver has chaired or served as a member of numerous local, national and international committees. From 2003 to 2004, he was president of the Victoria Confederation of Parent Advisory Councils (VCPAC). In 2004–2005 he was president of the University of Victoria Faculty Association and served as their chief negotiator in the 2003 and 2006 collective bargaining. Weaver has been engaged in public outreach and science communication. He sat on the CRD Roundtable on the Environment, and has delivered numerous public and school presentations and hosted many school field trips to his university laboratory over his career. He continues to lead the development of the Vancouver Island School Based weather station project.

Weaver has authored or coauthored over 200 peer-reviewed papers in climate, meteorology, oceanography, earth science, policy, education and anthropology journals. He was a lead author in the United Nations Intergovernmental Panel on Climate Change 2nd, 3rd, 4th and 5th scientific assessments. He was the chief editor of the Journal of Climate from 2005 to 2009.

== Honours and awards ==
Weaver is a fellow of the Royal Society of Canada, Canadian Meteorological and Oceanographic Society, the American Geophysical Union, the American Meteorological Society and the American Association for the Advancement of Science.

Over the years he has received numerous awards including the NSERC–EWR Steacie Memorial Fellowship in 1997, the Killam Research Fellowship and a CIAR Young Explorers award as one of the top 20 scientists in Canada under the age of 40 in 2002, the CMOS President's Prize in 2007. He was a lead author in 2nd, 3rd, 4th and 5th scientific assessments of the UN Intergovernmental Panel on Climate Change—the group that, with Al Gore, won the 2007 Nobel Peace Prize. He also received a Guggenheim Fellowship in 2008 and the Royal Society of Canada Miroslaw Romanowski Medal and the A.G. Huntsman Award for Excellence in Marine Science in 2011. In 2008 he was appointed to the Order of British Columbia and in 2013 he was awarded a Queen's Diamond Jubilee Medal. In 2014, Weaver received an Honorary DSc from McMaster University, and in 2026 the Alliance of World Scentists honoured him with an AWS Earth Planet Award. He gave the 2010 Elizabeth R. Laird Lecture at the Memorial University of Newfoundland.

== Publications ==
His book, Keeping our Cool: Canada in a Warming World was published by Viking Canada in September 2008 (ISBN 978-0-670-06800-5). His second book, Generation Us: The Challenge of Global Warming was published by Raven Books in 2011 (ISBN 978-1-55469-804-2).

== Politics ==
Andrew Weaver in conversation with Silver Donald Cameron

Weaver joined the British Columbia Green Party in October 2012 as the party's deputy leader and candidate for the riding of Oak Bay-Gordon Head. Federally, he is a member of the Liberal Party of Canada. He was elected in the 2013 provincial election as the first Green Party MLA in British Columbia's history.

Since running for office, Weaver has been a strong supporter of the development of the clean technology industry and a firm critic of the LNG Canada project. Weaver called the LNG plan a "pipe-dream", asserting that Liberal government promises of a $1 trillion boost to the provincial GDP, a $100 billion prosperity fund, and the elimination of the provincial debt and sales tax were unsubstantiated and irresponsible. Weaver was also involved in several local issues, such as calling for a reconsideration of the Capital Regional District's sewage treatment plan in 2013.

In August 2013, Weaver chose not to take on leadership of the BC Green Party stating: "I have an ambitious agenda for my term as MLA and achieving this requires focus and hard work. I consider it in the best interests of my constituents, the party and the province if, for now, I focus on my role as MLA and support a new interim leader who can concentrate on building the party." However, Weaver also stated that if he decided to re-run in the 2017 provincial election and was still the only elected BC Green Party MLA, he would then seek leadership of the party. On 24 November 2015 Weaver announced his bid to run for leadership of the British Columbia Green Party. He was acclaimed to this position on 9 December 2015.

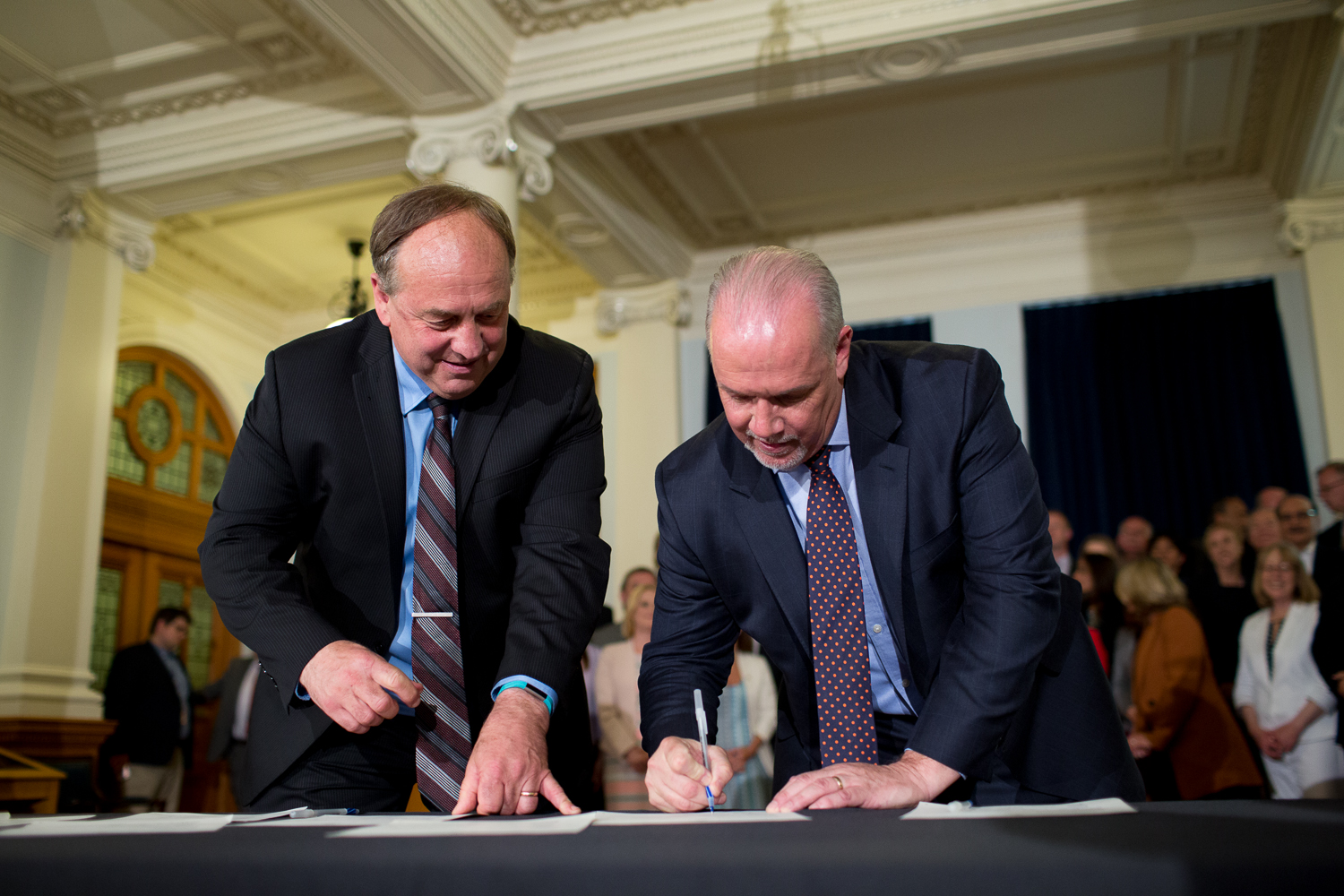
Green Party leader Andrew Weaver and NDP Premier John Horgan sign the confidence and supply agreement.

In the 2017 election, Weaver was reelected and the BC Green Party increased their share of the popular vote to 16.8% from 8.13%. Weaver was joined by BC Green MLAs Sonia Furstenau and Adam Olsen, forming the first BC Green Caucus in the province's history. The election resulted in a hung parliament, with the Greens holding the balance of power. Weaver led the subsequent negotiations with the BC Liberal Party and BC NDP. The Greens ultimately opted to remain an opposition party rather than forming a formal coalition and signed a confidence and supply agreement with the BC NDP, allowing NDP leader John Horgan to become premier. The agreement committed Weaver, Furstenau and Olsen to vote with the BC NDP government in matters of confidence, such as provincial budgets, and committed both parties to implementing a number of shared policy priorities.

In October 2019, Weaver announced that, due to a family health issue, he would step down as Green Party leader once another leader had been chosen and that he would not seek re-election to the Legislative Assembly. Adam Olsen became interim leader effective 6 January 2020. Weaver later announced that he was leaving the leadership, and the Green caucus, effective 20 January 2020, before a new leader could be elected, citing the need to "attend to personal matters". He continued to serve as an independent for the remainder of his term as an MLA.

In the lead-up to the 2024 BC election, Weaver publicly criticized David Eby, Horgan's successor as NDP leader and premier, and praised John Rustad, the leader of the BC Conservatives. He subsequently endorsed the Conservative candidate Stephen Andrew in his former riding of Oak Bay-Gordon Head, stating that the BC Greens had "lost their way fiscally and are proposing aspirational solutions that they have no hope of delivering or funding".

On September 23, 2026, Weaver announced he would run as a CentreBC candidate in Oak Bay-Gordon Head during the 2026 British Columbia general election citing the need for a centrist option in British Columbia politics; he finished fourth but received that highest percentage of any CentreBC candidate.

== Lawsuit over National Post articles ==
The British Columbia Supreme Court ruled that Weaver had been libelled in a series of National Post articles written by Terence Corcoran, Peter Foster and Kevin Libin that accused him of scientific misconduct in his studies of climate change, among other claims. In Weaver v. Corcoran the court ruled that the charges were false and that "the defamation in this case was serious. It offended Dr. Weaver's character and the defendants refused to publish a retraction". The court awarded Weaver $50,000 in damages, ordered that the offending articles be removed from the newspaper's archives and that a complete retraction be published. The National Post appealed the decision. On 21 April 2017, the British Columbia Court of Appeal ordered a retrial in the defamation suit, citing an error in the judge's analysis of the articles pertaining to the suit.

== Documentary film ==
Weaver is featured in the documentary film Running on Climate. Filming began before Weaver was nominated as a candidate and continued through the 2013 election campaign.

== Electoral record ==
2026 British Columbia general election: Oak Bay-Gordon Head
** Preliminary results — Not yet official **
Party	Candidate	Votes	%	±%
New Democratic	Diana Gibson	10,176	36.88	
Conservative	Stan Sipos	8,373	30.35	
Green	Andrew Appleton	6,164	22.34	
CentreBC	Andrew Weaver	2,846	10.31	—
Total valid votes		27,559	99.88	
Total rejected ballots		32	0.12	
Turnout		27,591		
Registered voters				
New Democratic hold		Swing		−6.88
Source: Elections BC

2017 British Columbia general election: Oak Bay-Gordon Head
Party	Candidate	Votes	%	±%	Expenditures
Green	Andrew Weaver	15,405	52.20	+11.77	$50,974
Liberal	Alex Dutton	7,008	23.74	−5.55	$62,220
New Democratic	Bryce Casavant	6,972	23.63	−4.79	$42,402
Vancouver Island Party	Jin Dong Yang-Riley	66	0.23	–	$100
4BC	Xaanja Ganja Free	59	0.20	–	$115
Total valid votes		29,510	100.00	–	
Total rejected ballots		89	0.30	−0.08	
Turnout		29,599	71.99	+2.43	
Registered voters		42,117			
Green notional hold		Swing			
Source: Elections BC

2013 British Columbia general election: Oak Bay-Gordon Head
Party	Candidate	Votes	%	±%	Expenditures
Green	Andrew Weaver	10,722	40.43	+31.52	$111,365
Liberal	Ida Chong	7,767	29.29	−17.35	$128,726
New Democratic	Jessica Van der Veen	7,536	28.42	−16.03	$105,108
Conservative	Greg Kazakoff	492	1.86	–	$3,550
Total valid votes		26,517	100.00	–	
Total rejected ballots		102	0.38	−0.25	
Turnout		26,619	69.56	+2.70	
Registered voters		38,267			
Green gain from Liberal		Swing		+24.44	
Source: Elections BC
