= Murray Rankin =

Canadian politician (born 1950)

Murray Rankin KC
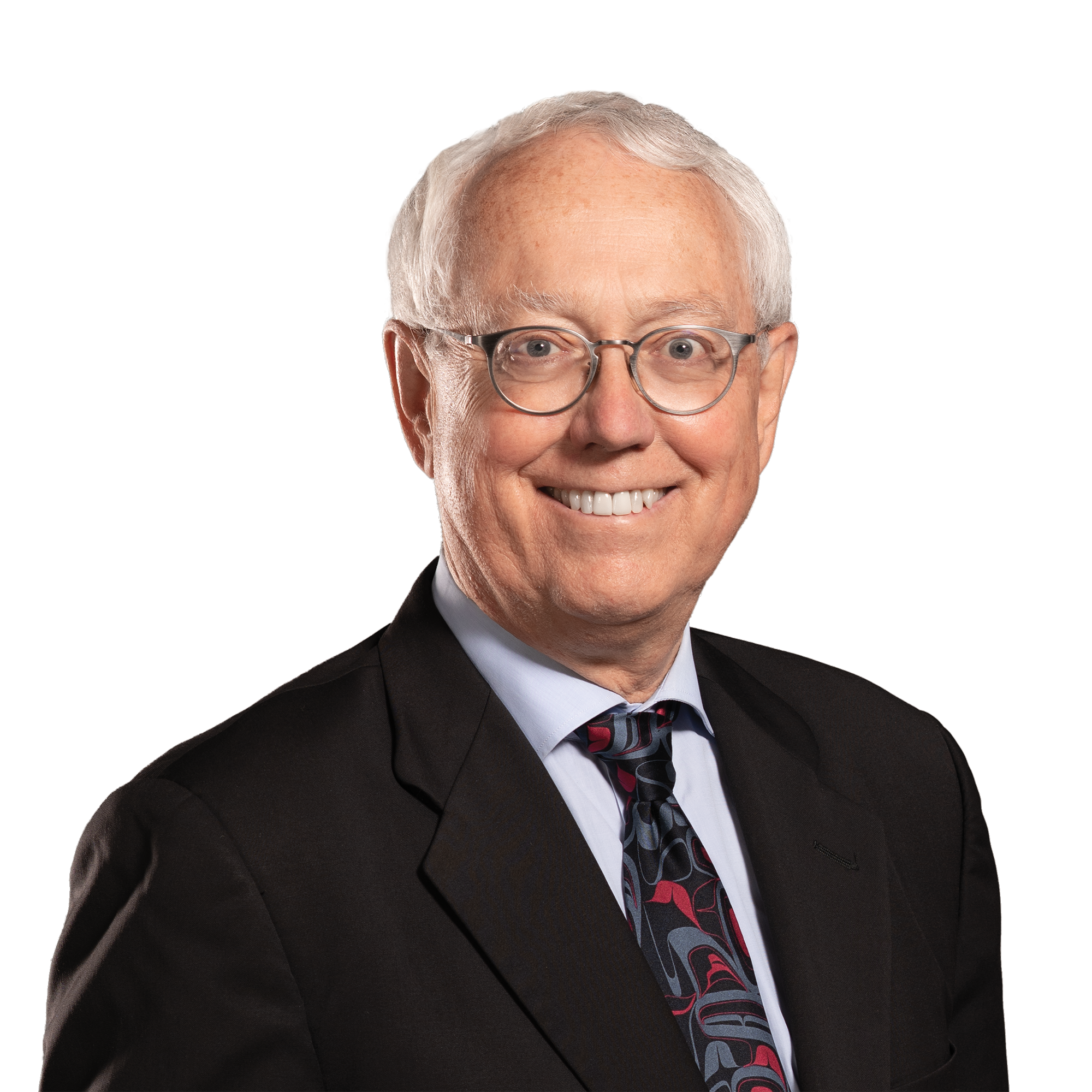
- Rankin in 2020

Attorney General of British Columbia
- Acting; July 22, 2022 – December 7, 2022
- Preceded by: David Eby
- Succeeded by: Niki Sharma

Minister of Indigenous Relations and Reconciliation of British Columbia
- In office November 26, 2020 – November 18, 2024
- Premier: John Horgan; David Eby
- Preceded by: Scott Fraser
- Succeeded by: Christine Boyle

Member of the British Columbia Legislative Assembly for Oak Bay-Gordon Head
- In office October 24, 2020 – September 21, 2024
- Preceded by: Andrew Weaver
- Succeeded by: Diana Gibson

Chair of the National Security and Intelligence Review Agency
- In office July 24, 2019 – September 17, 2020
- Prime Minister: Justin Trudeau
- Preceded by: Position established
- Succeeded by: Yves Fortier (acting chair)

House Leader of the New Democratic Party
- In office October 2016 – October 2017
- Leader: Tom Mulcair; Jagmeet Singh
- Preceded by: Peter Julian
- Succeeded by: Peter Julian

Member of Parliament for Victoria
- In office November 26, 2012 – October 21, 2019
- Preceded by: Denise Savoie
- Succeeded by: Laurel Collins

Personal details
- Born: January 26, 1950 (age 76) Belleville, Ontario, Canada
- Party: New Democratic
- Spouse: Linda Hannah
- Children: 2
- Education: Queen's University; Université de Montréal; McGill University; University of Toronto; Harvard University; University of Victoria (Honorary)
- Profession: Lawyer, law professor, politician

Murray Rankin KC (born January 26, 1950) is a Canadian politician, lawyer, and public law expert who served as British Columbia's Minister of Indigenous Relations and Reconciliation from 2020 to 2024. A member of the New Democratic Party, Rankin represented the riding of Oak Bay-Gordon Head in the Legislative Assembly of British Columbia from 2020 until 2024. Rankin previously served as the federal Member of Parliament for Victoria from 2012 to 2019, with senior roles including Justice and Attorney General Critic, Health Critic, and NDP House Leader. From 2019 to 2020, Rankin was head of Canada's National Security and Intelligence Review Agency (NSIRA), overseeing all national security and intelligence activities carried out by the Government of Canada. Previously, he was a professor of law at the University of Victoria, where he taught environmental and administrative law.

== Background ==
Rankin was born in Belleville, Ontario, the only male of five children, to Eleanore, a school teacher, and McKinley Rankin, a teacher and insurance agent. He went to university on scholarships, grants and loans, completing his undergrad at Queen's University and the Université de Montréal and his law degrees at the University of Toronto and Harvard University, where he graduated summa cum laude with a master's degree in law. Rankin was awarded an Honorary Doctor of Laws from the University of Victoria for his contributions to Canada.

Rankin is a founding member and former president of the British Columbia Public Interest Advocacy Centre, an NGO that provides legal services to marginalized groups in British Columbia. He is also former president of West Coast Environmental Law, past chairman of The Land Conservancy of British Columbia, and co-chair of the Environmental Law Centre at the University of Victoria, a student-run legal clinic doing public interest work in environmental law.

Rankin is a vegetarian, lives in Victoria, British Columbia, and is married to Linda Hannah, whom he met at a founding board meeting of the Western Canada Wilderness Committee. They have two children, Benjamin and Mark.

== Academic and legal career ==
According to the Vancouver Sun, Rankin "has fought for gay marriage rights in B.C., acted for governments, industry and First Nations on aboriginal land issues, and has taken a lead role on major environmental court cases in areas like sewage treatment, contaminated sites and environmental assessment." Rankin has appeared before all levels of court in British Columbia and in the Supreme Court of Canada. Rankin was appointed Queen's Counsel in 1999.

After finishing graduate school at Harvard Law School, Rankin taught at the University of Victoria as a professor of law until 1990. Rankin returned to the law school in 2004 to teach part-time as an adjunct professor of law, donating his salary to charity.

In 1990, Rankin joined up with his friend Joseph Arvay to become managing partner for the boutique law firm Arvay Finlay. In 1994, Murray Rankin was appointed by Premier Mike Harcourt as the lead treaty negotiator for the province of British Columbia. As treaty negotiator for the province of British Columbia Rankin negotiated the first agreement in principle under the auspices of the British Columbia Treaty Commission with the Sechelt Indian Band. He also represented the Blueberry River First Nations in the negotiation of the first economic benefits agreement relating to natural resources revenues in British Columbia. He also advised BC Hydro in the landmark agreement with two tribal councils related to the construction of the Lower Mainland Transmission Project. Rankin also successfully defended B.C. Forest Appeals Commission's jurisdiction in aboriginal rights case before Supreme Court of Canada (2003).

Rankin joined the national firm of Heenan Blaikie in 2006 as a partner in their Victoria office. He left the law firm in 2011 in order to pursue an independent practice that focused on environmental, aboriginal and public law.

== National Security & Intelligence career ==
While at Harvard Law School Rankin did his graduate thesis on freedom of information and national security matters and in the 1980s worked at the Organization of Economic Cooperation and Development in Paris on Transborder Information Flows. Rankin was later integrally involved in the consultations leading up to the enactment of the federal Access to Information Act and Privacy Act (Canada). For his efforts, Rankin received the House of Commons Award of Merit for his contributions to the development of freedom of information and privacy. Rankin was later retained as a special advisor to Colin Gabelmann, the former Attorney General of British Columbia and was a key architect of BC's own Freedom of Information and Protection of Privacy Act.

Rankin was former legal counsel to the Security Intelligence Review Committee, received a top-secret clearance, and conducted terrorism hearings. He was later appointed by the Justice Minister as a special advocate to do national security work under the Immigration and Refugee Protection Act where national security issues arise to protect the interests of people named in security certificates during hearings from which they and their own lawyers are excluded due to national security concerns. As Member of Parliament, Rankin gained recognition as a strong opponent of the Harper Government's C-51 "Anti-Terrorism Act", arguing that the bill violated constitutional rights and would not protect Canadians.

=== Chair of the National Security and Intelligence Review Agency ===
In 2017, Rankin was appointed by the Governor General, on the advice of the Prime Minister Justin Trudeau, to the newly formed National Security and Intelligence Committee of Parliamentarians. In July 2019, Prime Minister Justin Trudeau named Rankin to lead the newly created National Security and Intelligence Review Agency (NSIRA), overseeing all national security and intelligence activities carried out by the Government of Canada.

== Political career ==
Rankin's first entry into politics was as a volunteer for Stephen Lewis, former leader of the Ontario NDP. Rankin has since acted as an advisor to successive leaders of the BC NDP. When the BC NDP was in power in the 1990s, he helped shape public policy initiatives on access to information, treaty negotiations, land use, environmental policy, and justice. Rankin also advised BC NDP Opposition Leaders on public policy. Rankin led the NDP legal team to oppose the proposed Enbridge Northern Gateway Pipelines. He argued that British Columbia should withdraw from the federal government's review process and set up a "made-in-B.C." environmental assessment that ensures BC's economic, social, environmental, and aboriginal interests are fully addressed. In the early 2000s Rankin was asked to seek the BC NDP leadership. Rankin never entered the race, because of the young age of his two sons, and the contest was eventually won by Carole James. In February 2019, the BC Government announced that Rankin had been appointed as B.C.’s representative to help guide and design the reconciliation process between the Province and the Office of the Wetʼsuwetʼen.

=== Member of Parliament of Canada ===
In September 2012, Rankin announced his intention to seek the NDP nomination to become the federal Member of Parliament for Victoria following Denise Savoie's retirement. On November 26, 2012, Rankin was elected to Parliament with over 37% of the vote.

Rankin was first sworn into office on December 11, 2012. NDP Leader Tom Mulcair immediately named Rankin to a senior role in his shadow cabinet as National Revenue Critic. On January 28, 2013 Rankin was appointed to the Standing Committee on Finance, which reviews fiscal and monetary policy. Mulcair later added responsibility for Pensions to Rankin's critic portfolio. In 2014, Rankin was elected as Chair of the British Columbia Caucus. On February 23, 2015 Rankin became Official Opposition Health Critic and Vice-Chair of the Standing Committee on Health. Rankin was recognised as a "rising star", one of the NDP's top recruits, and "one of Parliament's sharpest legal minds".

In his role as National Revenue Critic, Rankin was an outspoken on the Conservative government's failure to tackle the issue of tax havens and tax evasion, which he argued put an unfair burden on honest Canadians. Rankin criticized layoffs at the Canada Revenue Agency which investigates tax fraud and supported the efforts of Parliamentary Budget Officer Kevin Page to measure the tax gap. A CBC and ICIJ investigation later revealed a massive data leak which proved that hundreds of Canadians were exploiting tax havens, including Liberal Senator Pana Merchant. Rankin also raised concerns over the federal government's crackdown on charities. In 2012, the Government ordered special audits of charities for political activities, and eventually provided $13.4 million for the initiative. The audits targeted environmental groups who have opposed the government's energy and pipeline policies, fight poverty, provide international aid and promote human rights, as well as a group of birdwatchers which were targeted for political activity. Rankin said he respected the need for audits to ensure charities comply with the rules, but he noted that many charities are now being tied up in paperwork over the audits, instead of being able to fulfil their charitable mandates and called for public hearings before the finance committee.

In his role as Health Critic, Rankin was recognised for bringing all parties together for a unanimous vote to compensate survivors of thalidomide poisoning. The victims, whose mothers were prescribed the federally approved drug for insomnia and morning sickness, were born with partial or missing limbs, blindness, deafness and internal organ damage. "I'm trying to do my very best for these people because I find their situation so poignant, so heart-wrenching," Rankin said. "They have been suffering from their disabilities for their whole lives. The Canadian government told their mothers that thalidomide was safe. That means we have a moral responsibility to provide them with support now." In May 2015, the Government agreed to provide victims of the drug annual payments of up to $100,000, depending on the severity of their disability, roughly on par with existing compensation levels in Germany and Britain. Taskforce representing Canada's living victims of Thalidomide thanked Rankin for his "tireless championing of our cause".

Rankin has been an outspoken advocate for environmental protection. Speaking at the 2013 NDP Convention, Rankin told delegates that "the NDP's leadership on the environment has always been a beacon to those of us who have fought to protect our environment and tackle the climate crisis head on." Weeks after being sworn in as Member of Parliament, Rankin was barred from entering the Harper government's "public hearing" on the Enbridge Northern Gateway Pipelines in his Victoria constituency, a project he opposed.

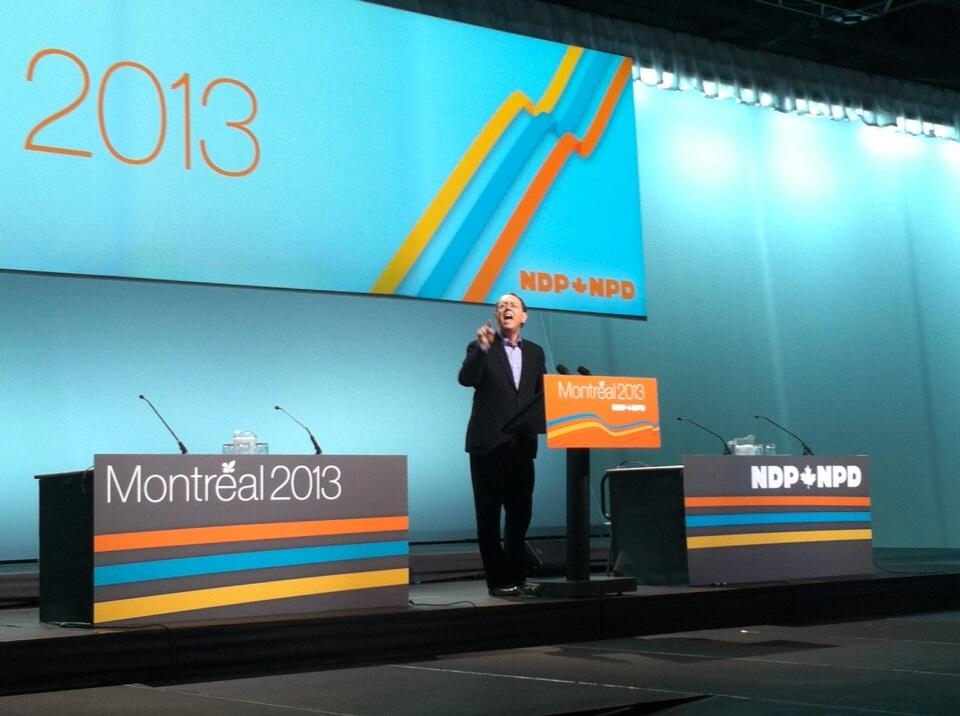
Rankin speaking at 2013 NDP Convention in Montreal

Rankin has also championed democratic reform. He has called for proportional representation electoral reform. In an op-ed to the Times Colonist Rankin argued, "Consensual political institutions involve and empower more citizens. They respond to — and represent — a deeper pool of interests and people. The policies they enact aren't just more representative of the average voter, they're more credible and more stable. Those qualities make consensual politics better for people, better for business, and better for the planet." While he acknowledged that under a proportional representation electoral system the New Democrats would have had fewer seats in Parliament, he wrote "It's a matter of principle. And the principle is simple: Every Canadian deserves fair representation, every voice should be equal and every vote should be counted."

On October 19, 2015, Rankin was re-elected to Parliament with an increased margin and over 42% of the vote. Rankin received the most votes of any NDP candidate in the 2015 election. The runner-up Green Party was later sanctioned by Elections Canada for violating the Canada Elections Act and "deliberately misleading voters" with "flawed and dated polling data in a bid to get voters to side with [the Green Party] candidate." On July 26, 2016, the Green Party executive director signed a compliance agreement admitting guilt.

On November 12, 2016, Rankin was named Justice and Attorney General critic for the NDP. On December 11, 2016, Rankin was elected vice-chair of the Special Joint Committee on Physician-Assisted Dying. The all-party House and Senate committee was struck to advise on the government's response to the Supreme Court's unanimous decision in Carter vs. Canada. On February 16, 2016, Rankin was elected vice-chair of Standing Committee on Justice and Human Rights.

Rankin served as House Leader for the New Democratic Party from October 2016 to October 2017 during the 2017 New Democratic Party leadership election. In October 2017, Rankin resumed his responsibilities as Justice and Attorney General critic for the NDP and was re-elected vice-chair of Standing Committee on Justice and Human Rights. On November 6, 2017, Rankin was appointed by the Governor General, on the advice of the Prime Minister, to the newly formed National Security and Intelligence Committee of Parliamentarians.

In October 2018, Rankin was nominated by his colleagues from all parties as a finalist for Maclean's "Hardest Working Member of Parliament," alongside Minister of Foreign Affairs Chrystia Freeland and Conservative Party Leader Andrew Scheer.

In 2019, Rankin gained national recognition as Vice Chair of the Justice Committee for his key role investigating the SNC Lavalin affair that ultimately led to the resignation of the Prime Minister's Principal Secretary, the Clerk of the Privy Council, and two Ministers.

In 2018, Rankin worked across political parties to ban single-use plastics following a report from a University of Victoria student. In 2019, the Government announced that would ban single-use plastics across the country by 2021.

On February 28, 2019, Rankin announced that he would not be running in the 2019 federal election. In a farewell speech in June 2019, Rankin called for urgent work towards reconciliation with indigenous peoples and addressing the climate crisis. He also urged the next Parliament to complete work to bring in a comprehensive public pharmacare program for all of Canada. He closed by saying, "Let us all recommit to a fairer Canada. Let us reduce the enormous and growing inequality between the rich and poor in our society. What J.S. Woodsworth said is still true today: “What we desire for ourselves, we wish for all”. However, Jack Layton still said it best: “My friends, love is better than anger.... So let us be loving, hopeful and optimistic.”" In July 2019, Prime Minister Justin Trudeau named Rankin to lead the newly created National Security and Intelligence Review Agency (NSIRA), overseeing all national security and intelligence activities carried out by the Government of Canada. His nomination was endorsed by all parties.

=== Member of Legislative Assembly of British Columbia ===
In 2020 Rankin was recruited as a star candidate for BC NDP in Oak Bay-Gordon Head, a riding the BC NDP had not held in nearly 25 years. In October 2020, Rankin was elected to the Legislative Assembly of British Columbia after receiving the largest swing in support in the 2020 general election.

Rankin joined Cabinet as British Columbia's Minister of Indigenous Relations and Reconciliation. British Columbia became the first province to release an action plan dedicated to implementing the United Nations Declaration on the Rights of Indigenous People in Canada. Rankin stated that, "We must make the province a place where the human rights of Indigenous Peoples are respected, celebrated and finally implemented in every aspect of society. The work ahead of us won't be easy – but together, we can change the trajectory of history and address the harms done by over 150 years of colonialism." In June 2022, Tahltan Central Government and the Province entered into the first consent-based decision-making agreement under the Declaration on the Rights of Indigenous Peoples Act.

In 2022, Rankin was appointed acting attorney general and minister responsible for Housing following David Eby's declaration that he was running to become BC's next premier. He was succeeded in that capacity by Niki Sharma in the new Eby ministry.

In June 2024, Rankin announced that he would not stand for re-election in the 2024 British Columbia general election.

== Electoral record ==
=== Federal elections ===
2015 Canadian federal election: Victoria
Party	Candidate	Votes	%	±%	Expenditures
New Democratic	Murray Rankin	30,397	42.28	+5.11	$222,151.95
Green	Jo-Ann Roberts	23,666	32.92	–1.39	$147,733.88
Liberal	Cheryl Thomas	8,489	11.81	–1.25	$36,120.06
Conservative	John Rizzuti	8,480	11.79	–2.69	$72,891.79
Libertarian	Art Lowe	539	0.75	+0.26	$900.00
Animal Alliance	Jordan Reichert	200	0.28	–	$10,110.17
Independent	Saul Andersen	124	0.17	–	none listed
Total valid votes/expense limit		71,895	99.67	–	$234,268.29
Total rejected ballots		241	0.33	+0.08	
Turnout		72,136	76.23	+33.20	
Eligible voters		94,627			
New Democratic hold		Swing		+3.25	
Cheryl Thomas resigned prior to the election.
Source: Elections Canada

Canadian federal by-election, November 26, 2012: Victoria After the resignation of Denise Savoie
Party	Candidate	Votes	%	±%	Expenditures
New Democratic	Murray Rankin	14,507	37.17	–13.61	$96,326.89
Green	Donald Galloway	13,389	34.30	+22.69	$97,263.91
Conservative	Dale Gann	5,654	14.49	–9.14	$90,730.65
Liberal	Paul Summerville	5,097	13.06	–0.92	$80,233.82
Libertarian	Art Lowe	193	0.49	–	$496.00
Christian Heritage	Philip G. Ney	192	0.49	–	$3,499.07
Total valid votes/expense limit		39,032	99.75	–	$97,992.97
Total rejected ballots		98	0.25	–0.09	
Turnout		39,130	43.03	–24.52	
Eligible voters		90,942			
New Democratic hold		Swing		–18.15	
Source: Elections Canada

=== Provincial elections ===
2020 British Columbia general election: Oak Bay-Gordon Head
Party	Candidate	Votes	%	±%	Expenditures
New Democratic	Murray Rankin	14,748	51.12	+27.50	$54,662.71
Green	Nicole Duncan	7,362	25.52	−26.68	$10,054.16
Liberal	Roxanne Helme	6,597	22.87	−0.88	$56,823.54
Communist	Florian Castle	142	0.49	–	$123.40
Total valid votes		28,849	99.55	–	
Total rejected ballots		129	0.45	+0.14	
Turnout		28,978	67.79	-4.20	
Registered voters		42,749			
New Democratic gain from Green		Swing		+27.09	
Source: Elections BC

British Columbia provincial government of John Horgan
Cabinet post (1)
Predecessor	Office	Successor
David Eby	Minister of Justice and Attorney General of British Columbia; July 22, 2022 – December 7, 2022	Niki Sharma
