= British Columbia Public Interest Advocacy Centre =

- Founded: 1981; Vancouver, British Columbia, Canada
- Type: Non-governmental organization
- Purpose: Justice
- Location: Vancouver, British Columbia, Canada
- Region served: British Columbia
- Method: Legal Aid, Advocacy
- Key people: Leigha Worth, Executive Director
- Revenue: $(2012)
- Website: http://bcpiac.com/

The British Columbia Public Interest Advocacy Centre (BCPIAC) is a non-profit, public interest law office. It legally assists people in natural resources management, human rights and poverty, and consumer issues.

== History ==
BCPIAC was founded in 1981 to provide representation to groups that would not otherwise have the resources to effectively assert their interests. The missions of BCPIAC is to advocate the interests of residential consumers, and in particular low-income groups, in the regulation and deregulation of services, and the interests of disadvantaged groups in obtaining access to justice and equality before the law.

== See also ==
- Public Interest
