= Michael Stevenson (educator) =

H. Michael Stevenson
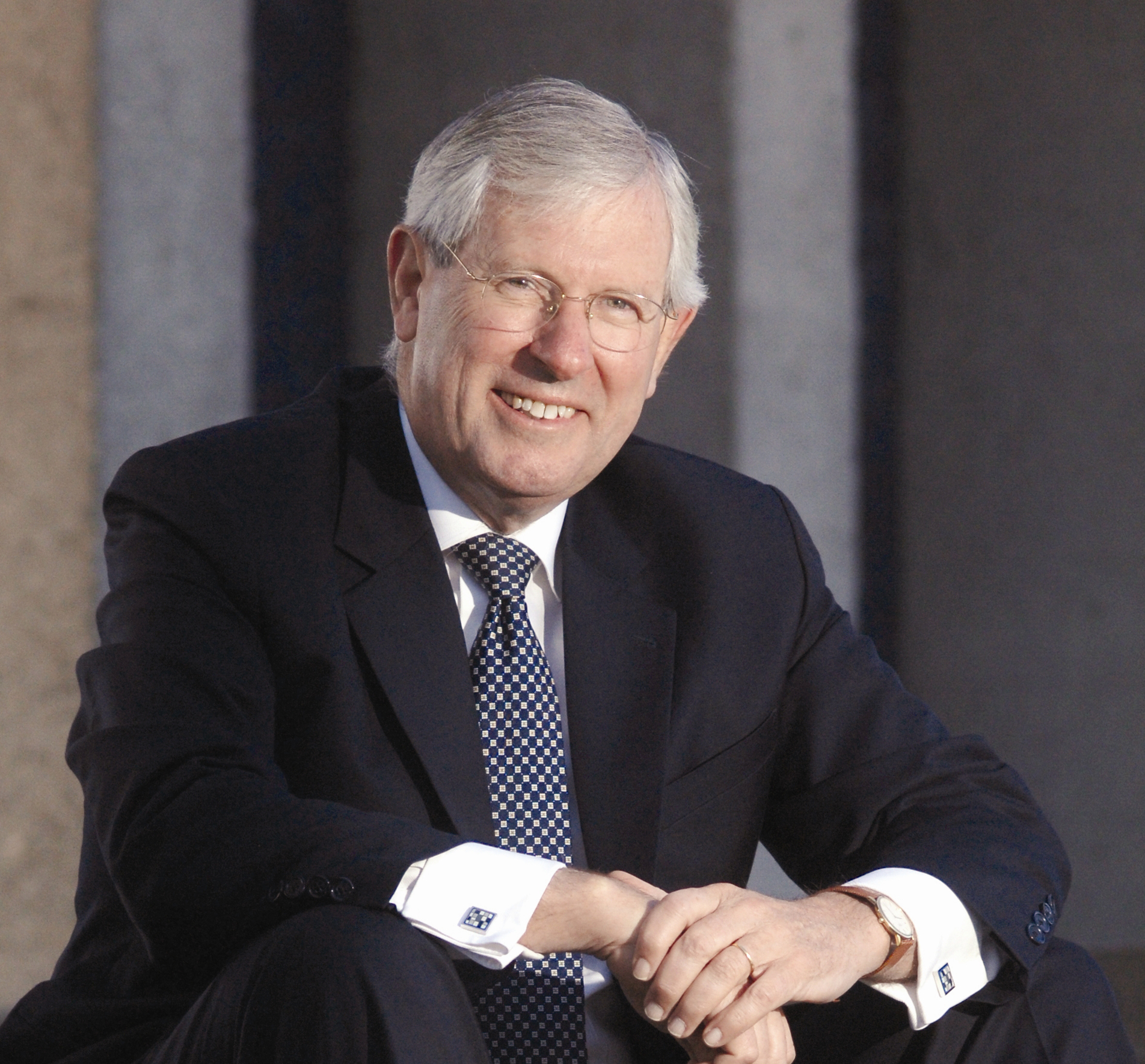
- Stevenson in 2006

8th President and Vice-Chancellor of Simon Fraser University
- In office 2000–2010
- Preceded by: Jack P. Blaney
- Succeeded by: Andrew Petter

Personal details
- Born: South Africa
- Spouse: Jan Whitford
- Education: University of the Witwatersrand; Northwestern University
- Profession: Author, professor

Academic background
- Thesis: Conflict and political instability in africa: A theoretical analysis supported by quantitative, cross-national comparison (1971)

Academic work
- Discipline: political science
- Institutions: York University; Simon Fraser University

H. Michael Stevenson is President Emeritus and Vice-Chancellor of Simon Fraser University. He retired on August 31, 2010, and was succeeded by Andrew Petter on September 1, 2010. Stevenson's appointment as President of Simon Fraser University spanned a decade, the longest term of any president in the history of the university.

== Education ==
Born in South Africa, Stevenson completed his undergraduate education in history and politics at the University of the Witwatersrand, followed by graduate work in the United States with a PhD from Northwestern University. He was awarded the top graduate student fellowship, a national Bobbs-Merrill Prize for graduate studies in political science and was later awarded a post-doctoral Rockefeller Foundation Fellowship for teaching and research in Nigeria.

== Career ==
Before his appointment as President of Simon Fraser University, he served as Dean of the Faculty of Arts, and as Vice-President Academic and Provost at York University. He has served as Chair of the British Columbia Council for International Education, and Chair of the Council of Western Canadian University Presidents. Additionally, he served on the Board of the Mathematics of Information Technology and Complex Systems (MITACS), as Chair of the University Presidents’ Council of British Columbia, Chair of the Standing Committee on Educational Issues and Funding of the Association of Colleges and Universities of Canada, as a Director on the Vancouver Board of Trade, the BC Business Council, Genome BC and EBound Canada.

He serves on the Boards of the Vancouver Opera, the British Columbia Achievement Foundation, the PuSh International Festival for the Performing Arts and the Advisory Council of the Vancouver Indian Summer Festival.

Academic offices
Preceded by Jack P. Blaney	8th President of Simon Fraser University; December 1, 2000 - August 30, 2010	Succeeded by Andrew Petter
