= Innovate BC =

- Company type: Crown Agency
- Founded: 2004; 22 years ago
- Headquarters: Vancouver, British Columbia, Canada
- Website: www.bcic.ca

Innovate BC (formally the BC Innovation Council or BCIC) is a Crown Agency of the Province of British Columbia, Canada, which funds entrepreneurial support programs in the province.

Innovate BC focuses on the support of technology startups and entrepreneurs through programs, sponsorship and competitions that facilitate technology commercialization. Innovate BC is a provincially funded agency that emphasizes services to support company growth, resulting in jobs, increased revenue and economic development through technology and innovation. Note, Innovate BC and Innovate Vancouver are separate entities.

== History ==
Innovate BC was first formed in 2004 after a merging of the Advanced Science Institute BC and the Innovation and Science Council of British Columbia. In 2018, they were renamed Innovate BC.
