= 2005 British Columbia municipal elections =

The Canadian province of British Columbia held municipal elections on November 19, 2005. Voters in each of BC's 157 municipalities elected mayors and councillors, and rural voters elected directors for their regional district electoral area. School boards and other specialized public bodies (such as the Vancouver Park Board) have also been elected, and various local referendums are held concurrently.

Political parties and slates are a common feature of governance in some municipalities in the Metro Vancouver and Greater Victoria areas, though the rest of the province's cities and towns resemble the majority of Canada in lacking overt partisan alliances. The City of Vancouver, as well as its neighbour Richmond in particular, has an entrenched and polarized party system unique in the country.

== Metro Vancouver ==
=== Burnaby ===
Candidate	Party	Vote	%
Derek Corrigan (inc.)	Burnaby Citizens Association	17,662	54.0
Andrew Stewart	Team Burnaby	13,951	42.6
Tom Tao	Independent	1,120	3.4

=== Coquitlam ===
Candidate	Vote	%
Maxine Wilson	7,970	44.6
Jon D.H. Kingsbury (inc.)	7,918	44.4
Harry Warren	1,962	10.6

=== Delta ===
Candidate	Vote	%
Lois E. Jackson (inc.)	12,181	51.8
Bruce McDonald	11,343	48.2

=== Langley (city) ===
Candidate	Vote	%
Peter Fassbender	Elected	
Dean Copeland		

=== Langley (township) ===
Candidate	Vote	%
Kurt Alberts (inc.)	7,694	62.7
Tom Ouellette	4,577	37.3

=== Maple Ridge ===
Candidate	Vote	%
Gordon Robson	6,990	48.8
Kathy Morse (inc.)	3,680	25.7
Bill Hartley	3,558	24.8
William Perry	99	0.7

=== New Westminster ===
Candidate	Vote	%
Wayne Wright (inc.)	5,814	
Casey Cook	4,499	

=== North Vancouver (city) ===
Candidate	Vote	%
Darrell R. Mussatto	2,687	40.2
Rod Clark	2,198	32.8
Barbara Ann Sharp (inc.)	1,738	26.0
Bill Tomlinson	69	1.0

=== North Vancouver (district) ===
Candidate	Vote	%
Richard Walton	6,838	44.6
Jim Cuthbert	4,488	29.3
Dave Sadler	940	6.1
David Dixon	869	5.7

=== Pitt Meadows ===
Candidate	Vote	%
Don MacLean (inc.)	2,104	75.7
Shawn Stevens	676	24.3

=== Port Coquitlam ===
Candidate	Vote	%
Scott Young (inc.)	6,003	89.0
Patrick Alambets	744	11.0

=== Port Moody ===
Candidate	Vote	%
Joe Trasolini (inc.)	Acclaimed	

=== Richmond ===
Candidate	Vote	%
Malcolm Brodie (inc.)	21,139	74.7
Michael Wolfe	7,165	25.3

=== Surrey ===
==== Mayor ====
Candidate	Vote	%
Dianne Watts	45,981	55.3
Doug McCallum (inc.)	35,558	40.3
Joe Pal	456	0.5
Joginder Singh Randhawa	448	0.5
Brady Warren Halverson	403	0.5
Jag Bhandari	327	0.4

==== Councillors ====
2005 Surrey election, Councillors (eight elected)
Candidate	Total votes	% of total votes
Bob Bose	39,313	7.10
Judy Villeneuve	37,088	6.70
Judy Higginbotham	35,705	6.45
Marvin Hunt	31,717	5.73
Barbara Steele	31,222	5.64
Tom Gill	25,869	4.67
Linda Heppner	25,260	4.56
Mary Martin	24,994	4.51
Cliff Annable	24,824	4.48
Sargy Chima	21,608	3.90
Rosemary Zelinka	21,536	3.89
Art Hildebrant	16,771	3.03
Barinder Rasode	16,202	2.93
Sheena Wilkie	15,219	2.75
Stephanie DeRapp	15,208	2.75
Ted Allen	15,180	2.74
Jim King	14,012	2.53
Amrik Singh Mahil	13,821	2.50
Jim McMurtry	13,238	2.39
Bill Stilwell	11,848	2.14
Rick Hart	11,678	2.11
David Evans	9,542	1.72
Jim Bester	7,494	1.35
Bob Martin	7,300	1.32
Barbara Saunders	6,083	1.10
Gary A. Hoffman	5,762	1.04
Rupinder S. Bhinder	5,508	0.99
Edward Rogers	5,237	0.95
Gurmit Bedi	4,877	0.88
Michael Chen	4,870	0.88
Mona Jagga	4,862	0.88
Bajinder Mann	4,683	0.85
Tammy Dao	4,124	0.74
Dalip Bhatia	3,716	0.67
Kheng-Lee Ooi (Huang)	3,362	0.61
Rob Terris	3,073	0.56
Pierre Rovtar	2,630	0.48
Ijaz Ahmed Chatta	2,336	0.42
Sada Maharaj	2,187	0.40
Joe Doserro	2,109	0.38
Syed Bokhari	1,544	0.28
Total valid votes	553,612	100.00

Electors could vote for eight candidates. Percentages are determined in relation to the total number of votes.

=== Vancouver ===
Sam Sullivan defeated Jim Green, and 18 other candidates, in the race for mayor.

=== West Vancouver ===
Candidate	Vote	%
Pamela Goldsmith-Jones	7,659	64.9
Ron Wood (inc.)	4,139	35.1

=== White Rock ===
Candidate	Vote	%
Judy Forster (inc.)	2,806	46.1
Ken Jones	2,075	34.1
Margaret Woods	1,210	19.9

== Capital Region ==
=== Central Saanich ===
Candidate	Vote	%
Jack Mar	2,099	54.3
Allison Habkirk (inc.)	1,768	45.7

=== Colwood ===
Candidate	Vote	%
Jody Twa (inc.)	?	
Bambi Fernando	?	
Terry Robinson	?	

=== Esquimalt ===
Candidate	Vote	%
Chris Clement	1,649	46.8
Ruth Layne	960	27.3
Darwin A. Robinson (inc.)	912	25.9

=== Langford ===
Candidate	Vote	%
Stewart Young (inc.)	2,605	75.7
Robert Fraser	836	24.3

=== North Saanich ===
Candidate	Vote	%
Ted Daly (inc.)	2,259	54.7
Patrick Godfrey	1,874	45.3

=== Oak Bay ===
Candidate	Vote	%
Christopher Causton (inc.)	Acclaimed	

=== Saanich ===
Candidate	Vote	%
Frank Leonard (inc.)	Acclaimed	

=== Sidney ===
Candidate	Vote	%
Don Amos (inc.)	Acclaimed	

=== Victoria ===
Candidate	Vote	%
Alan Lowe (inc.)	8,690	51.9
Ben Isitt	7,298	43.6
Gregory Hartnell	381	2.3
Diana Smardon	246	1.5
Georgia Jones	120	0.7

== Up-Island ==
=== Campbell River ===
Candidate	Vote	%
Roger McDonell	2,185	30.0
Bill Matthews	1,681	23.1
Lynn Nash (inc.)	1,598	21.9
Dave Jackson	1,342	18.4
Daniel Rabu	485	6.7

=== Comox ===
Candidate	Vote	%
Jim Brass (inc.)	2,814	73.1
Dennis Strand	1,035	26.9

=== Courtenay ===
Candidate	Vote	%
Starr Winchester (inc.)	3,028	80.6
M.W. Schell	728	19.4

=== Nanaimo ===
Candidate	Vote	%
Gary Richard Korpan (inc.)	6,330	30.5
John Ruttan	4,928	23.8
Jolyon Brown	4,888	23.6
Bill King	1,998	9.6
Dawn Tyndall	1,797	8.7
Angela Negrin	347	1.7
Simon Schachner	306	1.5
Adrian de Jong	143	0.7

=== North Cowichan ===
Candidate	Vote	%
Jon Lefebure (inc.)	2,808	56.8
Tom Walker	1,971	39.8
Peter Rudwaleit	169	3.4

=== Port Alberni ===
Candidate	Vote	%
Ken McRae (inc.)	?	
Jen Fisher-Bradley	?	
James Dominic King	?	

== Sunshine Coast and Sea to Sky ==
=== Powell River ===
Candidate	Vote	%
Stewart Alsgard (inc.)	1,910	51.1
David Gabelhouse	1,398	37.4
Jeff Mah	237	6.3
Leon Houle	194	5.2

=== Squamish ===
Candidate	Vote	%
Ian Sutherland (inc.)	2,261	54.0
Terrill Patterson	1,925	46.0

== Fraser Valley ==
=== Abbotsford ===
Candidate	Vote	%
George F. Ferguson	12,124	46.1
Mary Reeves (inc.)	10,888	41.4
Sid Gould	1,867	7.1
John Constible	1,222	4.6
Wes Pidgeon	218	0.8

=== Chilliwack ===
Candidate	Vote	%
Clint Hames (inc.)	Acclaimed	

=== Mission ===
Candidate	Vote	%
James Atebe	4,154	67.9
Mel Norder	1,543	25.2
Alan Podgorenko	256	4.2
Tim Felger	161	2.6

== Thompson, Shuswap and Cariboo ==
=== Kamloops ===
Candidate	Vote	%
Terry Lake	11,727	56.7
Pete Backus	4,525	21.9
Al McNair	4,416	21.4

=== Salmon Arm ===
Candidate	Vote	%
Marty Bootsma	1,210	26.1
Nancy Cooper	1,207	26.0
Greg Husband	1,008	21.7
Garrett Norman Wynne	570	12.3
Eugene Dionne	442	9.5
Aram Schneider	202	4.4

=== Williams Lake ===
Candidate	Vote	%
Scott Nelson	1109	28.9
Kerry Cook	1056	27.5
Elmer Theissen	868	22.6
Deb Demare	809	21.1

== Okanagan ==
=== Kelowna ===
Candidate	Vote	%
Sharon Shepherd	13,706	53.1
Walter Gray (inc.)	11,453	44.4
Stephen May	378	1.5
Andrew Uitvlugt	153	0.6
Kim Ouellette	115	0.4

=== Penticton ===
Candidate	Vote	%
Jake Kimberley	3,651	37.0
David Perry (inc.)	3,145	31.8
Mike Pearce	3,082	31.2

=== Vernon ===
Candidate	Vote	%
Wayne Lippert	2,984	31.6
Peter Armstrong	2,392	25.3
Dean Skoreyko	2,054	21.7
Derek Hall	2,016	21.3

== Kootenays ==
=== Cranbrook ===
Candidate	Vote	%
Ross Priest (inc.)	Acclaimed ?	

== Peace River ==
=== Dawson Creek ===
Candidate	Vote	%
Calvin Kruk	1,412	48.9
Wayne Dahlen (inc.)	1,051	36.4
Gary Loiselle	422	14.6

=== Fort St. John ===
Candidate	Vote	%
Jim Eglinski	1,534	45.4
Steve Thorlakson (inc.)	939	27.8
Dave Bodnar	657	19.4
Matthew Johnson	248	7.3

== Central Interior ==
=== Prince George ===
Candidate	Vote	%
Colin Kinsley (inc.)	8,650	49.6
Dan Rogers	8,008	45.9
Trent Derrick	571	3.3
Tyler Doerksen	160	0.9
Nathan Paul Prince	62	0.4

== Northwest ==
=== Prince Rupert ===
Candidate	Vote	%
Herb Pond (inc.)	3,377	83.0
Gloria Rendell	693	17.0

=== Terrace ===
Candidate	Vote	%
Jack Talstra (inc.)	Acclaimed	

== See also ==
- Municipal elections in Canada
