= Coquitlam-Maillardville =

Provincial electoral district in British Columbia, Canada

British Columbia electoral district
- Interactive map of riding boundaries

Provincial electoral district
- Legislature: Legislative Assembly of British Columbia
MLA
Matt Liang
Conservative
- First contested: 1991
- Last contested: 2026

Demographics
- Population (2021): 57,047
- Area (km²): 33
- Pop. density (per km²): 1,728.7
- Census division: Metro Vancouver
- Census subdivision(s): Coquitlam (part), Kwikwetlem

Coquitlam-Maillardville is a provincial electoral district for the Legislative Assembly of British Columbia.

== Demographics ==
Population, 2021	57,047
Area (km^{2})	33
Pop. Density (people per km^{2})	1,728
Source: BC Electoral Boundaries Commission

== Geography ==
Located in Coquitlam, the district comprises the communities of Maillardville, Austin Heights, Fraser Mills, Ranch Park and Mayfair. It is bordered by the Fraser River to the south and generally follows Coquitlam's eastern municipal boundary, with an extension into Port Coquitlam to include both Kwikwetlem First Nation reserves.

== Members of the Legislative Assembly ==
This riding has elected the following members of the Legislative Assembly:

Assembly	Years	Member	Party
Coquitlam-Maillardville; Riding created from Coquitlam-Moody
35th	1991–1996	John Cashore	New Democratic
36th	1996–2001	John Cashore	New Democratic
37th	2001–2005	Richard Stewart	Liberal
38th	2005–2009	Diane Thorne	New Democratic
39th	2009–2013	Diane Thorne	New Democratic
40th	2013–2017	Selina Robinson	New Democratic
41st	2017–2020	Selina Robinson	New Democratic
42nd	2020–2024	Selina Robinson	New Democratic
42nd	2024–2024	Selina Robinson	Independent
43rd	2024–2026	Jennifer Blatherwick	New Democratic
44th	2026–present	Matt Liang	Conservative

== Election results ==
2026 British Columbia general election
Party	Candidate	Votes	%	±%	Expenditures
Conservative	Matt Liang	9,626	49.6	+10.0	
New Democratic	Jennifer Blatherwick	8,057	41.5	-10.3	
Green	Nicola Spurling	1,732	8.9	+2.6	
Total valid votes		19,415			
Total rejected ballots					
Turnout					
Registered voters					
Conservative gain from New Democratic		Swing		+8.1	
Source: Elections BC

2024 British Columbia general election
Party	Candidate	Votes	%	±%	Expenditures
New Democratic	Jennifer Blatherwick	11,972	51.80	−7.3	$41,913.64
Conservative	Hamed Najafi	9,146	39.57	+39.2	$25,819.55
Green	Nicola Spurling	1,461	6.32	−5.3	$4,924.24
Independent	Ken Holowanky	535	2.31	–	$2,571.63
Total valid votes/expense limit		23,114	99.89	–	$71,700.08
Total rejected ballots		26	0.11	–	
Turnout		23,140	56.90	–	
Registered voters		40,666			
New Democratic notional hold		Swing		−23.2	
Source: Elections BC

2020 provincial election redistributed results
Party	%
New Democratic	59.1
Liberal	28.9
Green	11.6
Conservative	0.4

2020 British Columbia general election
Party	Candidate	Votes	%	±%	Expenditures
New Democratic	Selina Robinson	12,278	59.70	+9.09	$42,824.64
Liberal	Will Davis	5,882	28.60	−9.10	$17,661.62
Green	Nicola Spurling	2,405	11.69	+0.77	$3,326.81
Total valid votes		20,565	100.00	–	
Total rejected ballots		187	0.91	+0.47	
Turnout		20,752	52.48	−9.09	
Registered voters		39,542			
Source: Elections BC

2017 British Columbia general election
Party	Candidate	Votes	%	±%	Expenditures
New Democratic	Selina Robinson	11,438	50.61	+4.87	$68,146
Liberal	Steve Kim	8,519	37.70	−7.85	$76,040
Green	Nicola Eyton Spurling	2,467	10.92	+2.21	$843
Libertarian	Jesse Velay-Vitow	175	0.77	–	$250
Total valid votes		22,599	100.00	–	
Total rejected ballots		99	0.44	−0.41	
Turnout		22,698	61.57	+4.88	
Registered voters		36,865			
Source: Elections BC

2013 British Columbia general election
Party	Candidate	Votes	%	±%	Expenditures
New Democratic	Selina Robinson	9,930	45.74	−2.18	$107,325
Liberal	Steve Kim	9,889	45.55	+0.89	$80,581.18
Green	Edward Andreas Stanbrough	1,891	8.71	+36.3	$750
Total valid votes		21,710	100.00		
Total rejected ballots		186	0.85	+0.19	
Turnout		21,896	56.69	+1.47	
Source: Elections BC

2009 British Columbia general election
Party	Candidate	Votes	%	±%	Expenditures
New Democratic	Diane Thorne	9,818	47.92	+0.96	$70,174
Liberal	Dennis Marsden	9,150	44.66	+0.06	$95,363
Green	Stephen Reid	1,040	5.08	–1.23	$350
Independent	Doug Stead	481	2.35	–	$9,691
Total valid votes		20,484	100.00		
Total rejected ballots		137	0.66	−0.04	
Turnout		20,621	55.22	+6.35	
Registered voters		37,342			
Source: Elections BC

B.C. General Election 2005: Coquitlam–Maillardville
Party	Candidate	Votes	%	±	Expenditures
NDP	Diane Thorne	10,532	46.96%		$48,645
Liberal	Richard Stewart	10,001	44.60%		$83,294
Green	Michael Hejazi	1,415	6.31%	–	$1,453
Marijuana	Brandon Steele	236	1.05%		$100
Libertarian	Paul Geddes	173	0.77%		$100
Platinum	Nattanya Andersen	69	0.31%	–	$100
Total Valid Votes		22,426	100%		
Total Rejected Ballots		156	0.70%		
Turnout		22,582	48.87%		

B.C. General Election 2001: Coquitlam–Maillardville
Party	Candidate	Votes	%	±	Expenditures
Liberal	Richard Stewart	11,549	56.97%		$32,195
NDP	Ken Landgraff	4,442	21.90%		$17,917
Green	Elly Petersen	2,522	12.44%	–	$466
Unity	Tim Bonner	862	4.25%		$2,001
Marijuana	Paul Geddes	584	2.88%		$721
Independent	Harry Warren	170	0.84%		$1,245
Independent	Doug Stead	144	0.72%		$200
Total valid votes		20,273	100.00%		
Total rejected ballots		75	0.37%		
Turnout		20,348	71.42%		

B.C. General Election 1996: Coquitlam–Maillardville
Party	Candidate	Votes	%	±	Expenditures
NDP	John Cashore	10,812	45.91%		$39,269
Liberal	Maxine Wilson	9,440	40.08%		$40,547
Reform	Bev Welsh	1,434	6.09%		$21,126
Progressive Democrat	Angela Broughton	1,289	5.47%	–	$785
Libertarian	Rob Gillespie	224	0.95%		
Social Credit	Dave Gallagher	133	0.56%	–	$1,449
Natural Law	Richard Van Schaik	123	0.52%		$123
Conservative	Debra Hicks	96	0.41%		
Total valid votes		23,551	100.00%		
Total rejected ballots		115	0.49%		
Turnout		23,666	72.33%		

B.C. General Election 1991: Coquitlam–Maillardville
Party	Candidate	Votes	%	±	Expenditures
NDP	John Cashore	11,136	47.18%		$45,717
Liberal	Bill F. McGuire	8,930	37.84%		$7,901
Social Credit	Bev A. Welsh	3,354	14.21%	–	$18,354
Independent	Marc (Mikael Ballan) A. R. Boyer	117	0.50%		$790
Libertarian	Lewis C. Dahlby	65	0.25%		
Total valid votes		23,602	100.00%		
Total rejected ballots		518	2.15%		
Turnout		24,120	75.18%		

== See also ==
- List of British Columbia provincial electoral districts
- Canadian provincial electoral districts
- Maillardville
