= Greater Vancouver =

- Metropolitan area
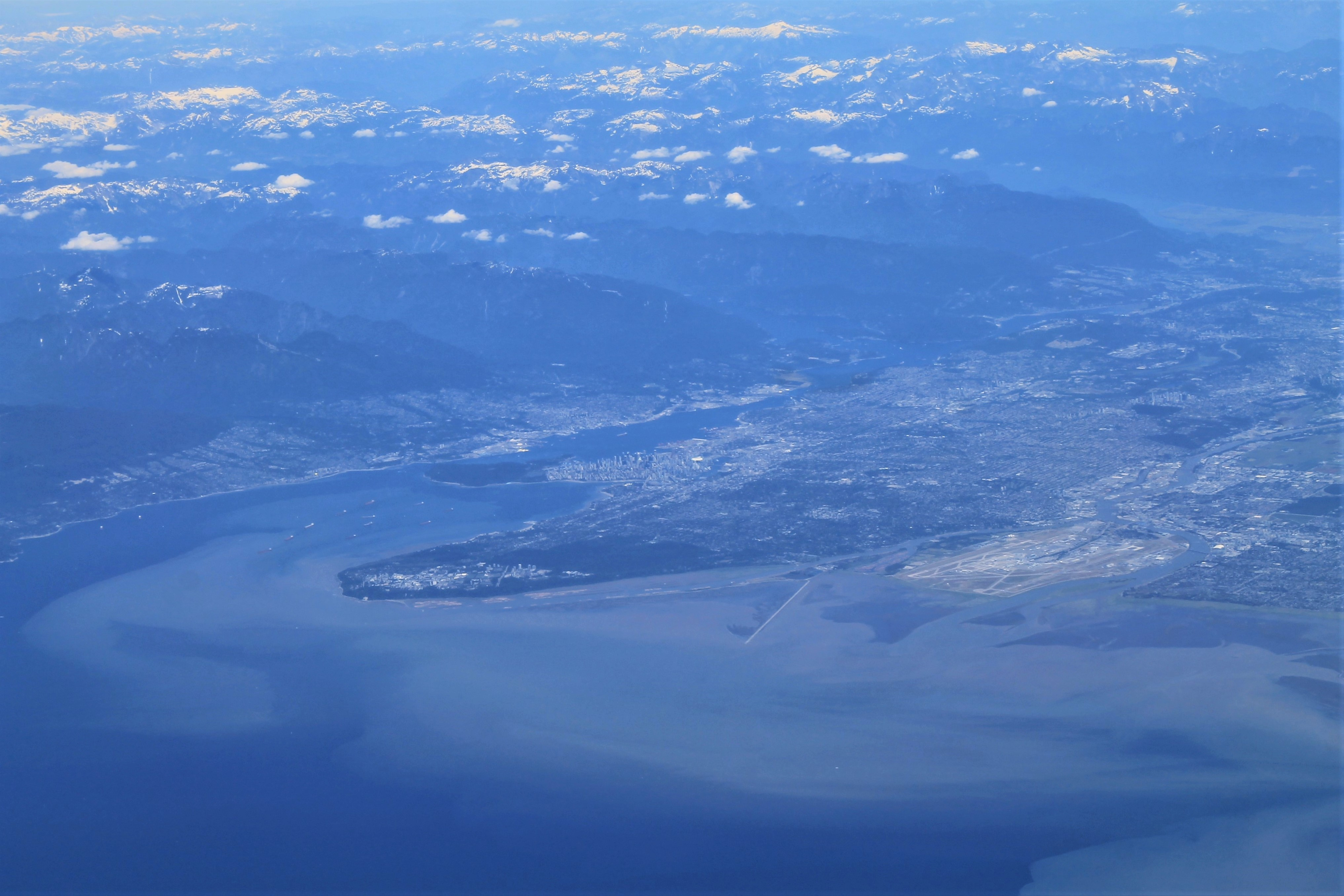
- Aerial view of the region
Interactive map of Greater Vancouver
City of Vancouver
City of Surrey
City of Burnaby
City of Richmond
City of Coquitlam
City of Delta
City of New Westminster
City of Port Coquitlam
City of North Vancouver
District Municipality of West Vancouver
Other municipalities in Greater Vancouver
- Coordinates: 49°14′58″N 122°58′47″W
- Country: Canada
- Province: British Columbia
- Regional districts: Mainly: Metro Vancouver; Extends into: Fraser Valley, Squamish-Lillooet
- Largest city: Vancouver

Government
  - Senators: List of senators: Yonah Kim-Martin (Conservative); Gerry St. Germain (Conservative)
  - MPs: List of MPs: John Aldag (Liberal); Parm Bains (Liberal); Terry Beech (Liberal); Don Davies (New Democratic); Marc Dalton (Conservative); Sukh Dhaliwal (Liberal); Kerry-Lynne Findlay (Conservative); Hedy Fry (Liberal); Ken Hardie (Liberal); Peter Julian (New Democratic); Jenny Kwan (New Democratic); Ron McKinnon (Liberal); Wilson Miao (Liberal); Joyce Murray (Liberal); Taleeb Noormohamed (Liberal); Tako van Popta (Conservative); Carla Qualtrough (Liberal); Harjit Sajjan (Liberal); Randeep Sarai (Liberal); Jagmeet Singh (New Democratic); Patrick Weiler (Liberal); Jonathan Wilkinson (Liberal); Bonita Zarrillo (New Democratic)
  - MLAs: List of MLAs: Harry Bains (NDP); Jennifer Whiteside (NDP); Rick Glumac (NDP); Katrina Chen (NDP); Jagrup Brar (NDP); Stephanie Cadieux (BCL); David Eby (NDP); Raj Chouhan (NDP); Megan Dykeman (NDP); Anne Kang (NDP); Adrian Dix (NDP); Mable Elmore (NDP); Mike Starchuk (NDP); Mike Farnworth (NDP); Ravi Kahlon (NDP); Rachna Singh (NDP); Andrew Wilkinson (BCL); Pam Alexis (NDP); Garry Begg (NDP); George Chow (NDP); Spencer Chandra Herbert (NDP); Trevor Halford (BCL); Fin Donnelly (NDP); Teresa Wat (BCL); Melanie Mark (NDP); Janet Routledge (NDP); George Heyman (NDP); Brenda Bailey (NDP); Jordan Sturdy (BCL); Ian Paton (BCL); Andrew Mercier (NDP); Bruce Ralston (NDP); Henry Yao (NDP); Lisa Beare (NDP); Niki Sharma (NDP); Michael Lee (BCL); Karin Kirkpatrick (BCL); Selina Robinson (NDP); Susie Chant (NDP); Bowinn Ma (NDP); Kelly Greene (NDP)

Area
  - Total: 2,882.68 km^{2} (1,113.01 sq mi)
- Elevation: 60 m (200 ft)

Population (2021) (Note: Cited population is that of the Metro Vancouver Regional District; this does not represent the population of the entire Greater Vancouver region.)
  - Total: 2,642,825
  - Estimate (2024): 3,108,926
  - Rank: 3rd in Canada
  - Density: 916.79/km^{2} (2,374.5/sq mi)

GDP (nominal, 2022)
  - Total: CA$202.46 billion
- Time zone: UTC−07:00 (Pacific Time)
- Area codes: 604, 778/236/672
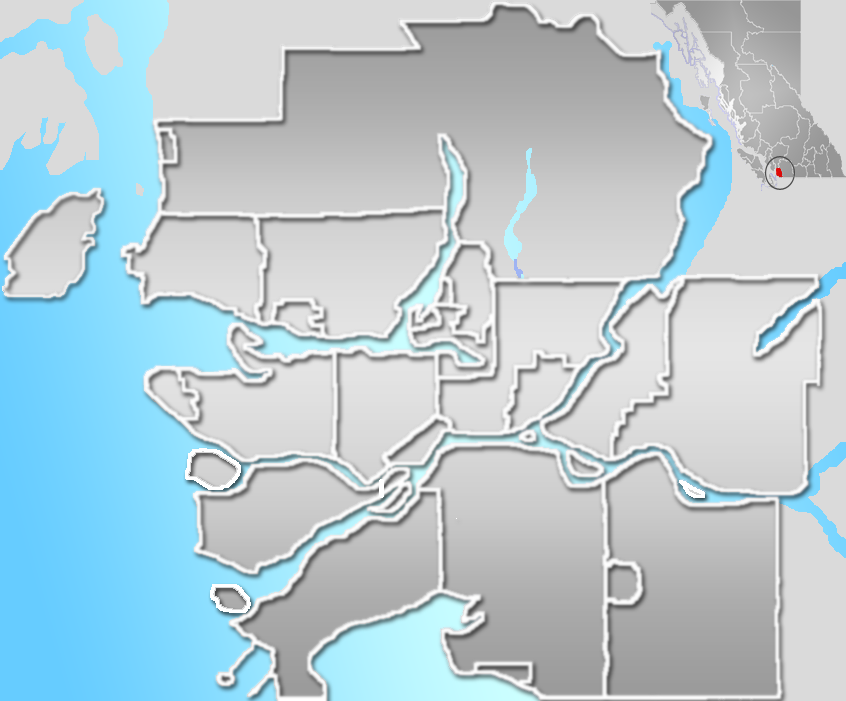
- Municipalities in the Greater Vancouver region

Greater Vancouver, also known as Metro Vancouver, is the third-largest metropolitan area in Canada, after Greater Toronto and Greater Montreal. The term Greater Vancouver describes an area that is roughly coterminous with the region governed by the Metro Vancouver Regional District (MVRD), though it predates the 1966 creation of the regional district. It is often used to include areas beyond the boundaries of the regional district but does not generally include wilderness and agricultural areas that are included within the MVRD.

Usage of the term Greater Vancouver is not consistent. In local use, it tends to refer to urban and suburban areas only and does not include parts of the regional district such as Bowen Island, although industries such as the film industry even include Squamish, Whistler and Hope as being in "the Vancouver area" or "in Greater Vancouver". The business community often includes adjoining towns and cities such as Mission, Chilliwack, Abbotsford and Squamish within their use of the term Greater Vancouver, though since the creation of the Metro Vancouver Vancouver Regional District, the term Metro Vancouver has come to be used in the media interchangeably with Greater Vancouver.

As a geographic region, Greater Vancouver is part of the Lower Mainland, one of British Columbia's three main geospatial/cultural divisions, and overlaps with the Lower Fraser Valley, with the Central and Upper Fraser Valley areas to the east being in the Fraser Valley Regional District, which was created from two others upon the expansion of the Greater Vancouver Regional District to include Maple Ridge and Pitt Meadows. Other forms of regional governance and administration whose jurisdiction Greater Vancouver is in are the North Vancouver and Coquitlam Forests Districts, and the Ministry of Environment's Lower Mainland Region (which includes the Sunshine Coast, the Fraser Health Authority and the New Westminster Land District, among others).

== Geography ==
Greater Vancouver occupies the southwest corner of mainland British Columbia. It comprises roughly the western half of the Lower Mainland and sits astride the lower reaches of the Fraser River and both banks of Burrard Inlet.

Thirteen of the province's thirty most populous municipalities are located in Greater Vancouver. The official land area of the district is 2,877.36 square kilometres (1,111 sq mi). It is the most densely populated region in British Columbia.

The University of British Columbia campus and the University Endowment Lands, both located to the west of the City of Vancouver's limits, are not subject to governance by any municipality.

There are also seventeen Indian reserves within the geographical area that are not subject to governance by the municipalities or the Regional District; they have a combined population of 7,550 (2006) and are governed by the Squamish Nation, Musqueam Nation, Tsleil-waututh First Nation, Tsawwassen First Nation, Semiahmoo First Nation, Kwikwetlem First Nation, Katzie First Nation and Kwantlen First Nation.

Population density map of Greater Vancouver based on the 2006 Census (UBC and Electoral District A are based on the 2001 Census).

The cities of Abbotsford, Chilliwack, and Mission, located to the region's east, are often linked to Vancouver in promotions and tourism and in various non-official usages, as are Squamish and Whistler to the region's north.

== Demographics ==
Metro Vancouver
| Year | Pop. | ±% |
|---|---|---|
| 1891 | 21,887 | — |
| 1901 | 42,926 | +96.1% |
| 1911 | 164,020 | +282.1% |
| 1921 | 232,597 | +41.8% |
| 1931 | 347,709 | +49.5% |
| 1941 | 393,898 | +13.3% |
| 1951 | 562,462 | +42.8% |
| 1961 | 790,741 | +40.6% |
| 1971 | 1,028,334 | +30.0% |
| 1981 | 1,169,831 | +13.8% |
| 1991 | 1,602,590 | +37.0% |
| 1996 | 1,831,665 | +14.3% |
| 2001 | 1,986,965 | +8.5% |
| 2006 | 2,116,581 | +6.5% |
| 2011 | 2,313,328 | +9.3% |
| 2016 | 2,463,431 | +6.5% |
| 2021 | 2,642,825 | +7.3% |

The 2016 census indicates a population of 2,463,431 in Greater Vancouver, representing a 6.5 percent increase from the 2011 census.

The population of Metro Vancouver is of diverse origin. In 1981, approximately 14 percent of Greater Vancouver's population belonged to a visible minority group. The 2016 census showed that 48.6 percent of the population was of European heritage, 2.5 percent was of Indigenous heritage, and the remaining 48.9 percent of the population were of visible minority origin, the largest group being Chinese followed by South Asians. Other prominent groups include Filipinos, Koreans, Japanese, Southeast Asian, West Asian, and Latin Americans. British Columbia is Canada's most ethnically diverse province.

Panethnic groups in Greater Vancouver (2001–2021)
| Panethnic group | 2021 | | 2016 | | 2011 | | 2006 | | 2001 | |
| Panethnic group | Pop. | % | Pop. | % | Pop. | % | Pop. | % | Pop. | % |
|---|---|---|---|---|---|---|---|---|---|---|
| European (Note: 2001–2016: Statistic includes all persons that did not make up part of a visible minority or an indigenous identity.) (Note: 2021: Statistic includes all persons belonging to the non-indigenous and non-visible minority "White" population group.) | 1,124,475 | 43.13% | 1,179,100 | 48.6% | 1,197,985 | 52.53% | 1,182,355 | 56.36% | 1,204,970 | 61.24% |
| East Asian (Note: Statistic includes total responses of "Chinese", "Korean", and "Japanese" under visible minority section on census.) | 606,920 | 23.28% | 557,745 | 22.99% | 488,240 | 21.41% | 451,790 | 21.53% | 395,540 | 20.1% |
| South Asian | 369,295 | 14.17% | 291,005 | 11.99% | 252,405 | 11.07% | 207,165 | 9.87% | 164,365 | 8.35% |
| Southeast Asian (Note: Statistic includes total responses of "Filipino" and "Southeast Asian" under visible minority section on census.) | 198,940 | 7.63% | 168,075 | 6.93% | 156,315 | 6.85% | 112,365 | 5.36% | 85,485 | 4.34% |
| Middle Eastern (Note: Statistic includes total responses of "West Asian" and "Arab" under visible minority section on census.) | 87,090 | 3.34% | 62,440 | 2.57% | 48,870 | 2.14% | 35,590 | 1.7% | 27,340 | 1.39% |
| Indigenous | 63,345 | 2.43% | 61,455 | 2.53% | 52,375 | 2.3% | 40,310 | 1.92% | 36,855 | 1.87% |
| Latin American | 51,500 | 1.98% | 34,805 | 1.43% | 29,125 | 1.28% | 22,695 | 1.08% | 18,715 | 0.95% |
| African | 41,180 | 1.58% | 29,830 | 1.23% | 23,545 | 1.03% | 20,670 | 0.99% | 18,405 | 0.94% |
| Other/multiracial (Note: Statistic includes total responses of "Visible minority, n.i.e." and "Multiple visible minorities" under visible minority section on census.) | 65,350 | 2.51% | 41,780 | 1.72% | 31,835 | 1.4% | 25,035 | 1.19% | 15,810 | 0.8% |
| Total responses | 2,607,015 | 98.65% | 2,426,235 | 98.49% | 2,280,695 | 98.59% | 2,097,965 | 99.12% | 1,967,480 | 99.02% |
| Total population | 2,642,825 | 100% | 2,463,431 | 100% | 2,313,328 | 100% | 2,116,581 | 100% | 1,986,965 | 100% |
Note: Totals greater than 100% due to multiple origin responses.

== Politics and government ==
=== Federal ===
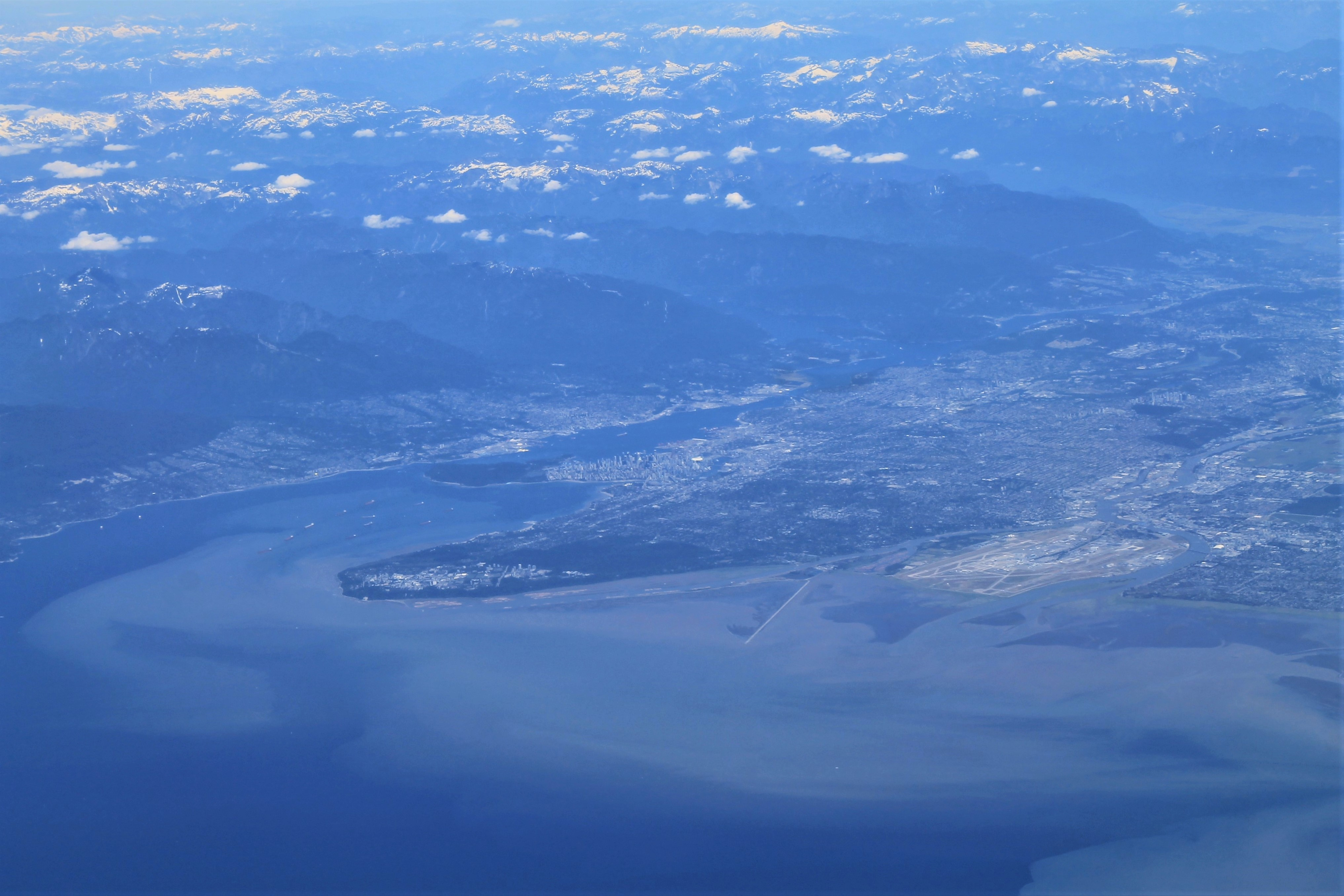
Vancouver Metropolitan Area in 2018

Federally, the electorates in the Greater Vancouver region elect Conservative, New Democratic, and Liberal members of Parliaments – the region is an important bedrock of left-of-centre support in conservative-leaning Western Canada; along with the NDP's strength on Vancouver Island, coastal BC often accounts for over half of left-of-center MPs west of Ontario in most parliaments.

After the 2011 election, the Conservatives and NDP emerged as the two strongest parties in the region, with Conservative support concentrated in the suburbs around Vancouver (e.g. North Vancouver, West Vancouver, and Richmond), and NDP support strongest on the east side of Vancouver, Burnaby, Coquitlam, and New Westminster.

In 2011, the Liberals were reduced to two seats, both located in Vancouver. However, in the 2015 election, a reversal of fortunes led to the Liberals taking most of the seats in the region away from the Conservatives; the 2019 election had the Conservatives gain some seats back in Richmond, Langley and southern Surrey; many of these swung back to the Liberals in the 2021 election.

=== Provincial ===
Greater Vancouver, like the rest of British Columbia, is divided between BC United and the BC NDP. While BC United are not formally affiliated with any federal party, they tend to draw support from those who vote for either the Liberal Party of Canada or the Conservative Party of Canada, while the BC NDP provide a centre-left alternative, and is formally affiliated with the New Democratic Party of Canada. Polling from the 2013 provincial election showed that supporters of the BC Liberals were almost evenly split between federal Liberals and federal Conservatives. Despite this trend, former NDP premier Ujjal Dosanjh ran federally for the Liberals in the 2004 election, and some NDP supporters have drifted to the Greens in recent years.

In terms of political geography, Greater Vancouver is not as polarized between urban core and suburban areas as metropolitan areas in other parts of the country are. However, the BC NDP tends to draw greater support from ridings on the east side of Vancouver, Burnaby, the Tri-Cities, and parts of Surrey. By contrast, the BC Liberals are stronger on the west side of Vancouver, the North Shore, the Fraser Valley, and held every seat in Richmond from 1991 to 2020. Ridings in Central Vancouver, like Vancouver-Fairview and Vancouver-Point Grey, and Surrey tend to be swing ridings, with close races between the two parties. Vicki Huntington, an Independent member of the Legislative Assembly, has represented the riding of Delta South since 2009.

Between 1986 and 2013, every premier of British Columbia (other than Dan Miller from August 25, 1999, to February 24, 2000) represented a riding from within Greater Vancouver. After Christy Clark lost her seat in Vancouver-Point Grey in the 2013 provincial election, and until David Eby succeeded John Horgan in 2022, premiers represented ridings outside Greater Vancouver. Premier Eby is the MLA for Vancouver-Point Grey.

=== Minority representation ===
Due to the region's ethnically diverse population, there is also diverse government representation. Federally, there are five MPs of visible minority origin: three of South Asian descent, one of Chinese descent, and one of Trinidadian descent. Provincially, there are six South Asian, three Chinese, one Japanese, and one Filipino MLAs.

The Greater Vancouver region has many "electoral firsts". Rosemary Brown was the first black woman elected to political office, becoming an MLA in 1972, and the first woman and first black person to run for a party leadership in 1975. Emery Barnes, a football player elected to the Legislature alongside Rosemary Brown in 1972, and stayed in that capacity until 1996, serving as the Speaker from 1994. Former Indo-Canadian premier Ujjal Dosanjh was the first non-white premier of the province, while Douglas Jung was the first Chinese-Canadian to become a Member of Parliament. Yonah Martin is the first Korean-Canadian to hold federal public office. Jenny Kwan was the first Chinese-Canadian provincial cabinet minister in Canada. Naomi Yamamoto and Mable Elmore are respectively the first Japanese and Filipino MLAs in the province. Furthermore, Stephanie Cadieux is the first quadriplegic MLA, while Svend Robinson was the first openly gay Canadian MP. James Atebe was the first black mayor in Mission, British Columbia.
