= Doug Bing =

Canadian politician

Doctor Doug Bing

Member of the British Columbia Legislative Assembly for Maple Ridge-Pitt Meadows
- In office May 14, 2013 – May 9, 2017
- Preceded by: Michael Sather
- Succeeded by: Lisa Beare

Personal details
- Born: 1950 or 1951 (age 74–75) Vancouver, British Columbia
- Party: BC Liberal
- Spouse: Helen Henderson
- Education: University of British Columbia
- Profession: Dentist

Chinese name
- Traditional Chinese: 李德明
- Simplified Chinese: 李德明
Transcriptions
Standard Mandarin
- Hanyu Pinyin: Lǐ Démíng
Yue: Cantonese
- Jyutping: Lei^{5} Dak^{1}-ming^{4}

Doug Bing (Chinese: 李德明; born 1950 or 1951) is a Canadian politician and dentist who served as the member of the Legislative Assembly (MLA) of British Columbia for Maple Ridge-Pitt Meadows from 2013 to 2017, and a Pitt Meadows municipal councillor from 2005 to 2014.

== Biography ==
Born in Vancouver, Bing is a third-generation Chinese Canadian. He served as president at his high school's student council, and as student representative at the University of British Columbia (UBC) Senate. He received a Bachelor of Science degree from UBC, before graduating with a Doctor of Dental Medicine degree from the same school in 1977. He met his wife Helen at UBC, and the couple opened a dental clinic in Pitt Meadows in 1980; they have three sons together.

He was elected as a Pitt Meadows municipal councillor in 2005, and won re-election in 2008 by finishing in first place. After announcing his intention to run for mayor of Pitt Meadows in April 2011, he stepped aside that August and instead sought re-election as councillor. He finished first again at the 2011 civic election and won his third term on council.

He was nominated as the British Columbia Liberal Party candidate for Maple Ridge-Pitt Meadows in February 2013, and defeated New Democratic Party (NDP) candidate Elizabeth Rosenau by 620 votes in the 2013 provincial election to become the riding's MLA. He stayed on as Pitt Meadows councillor until February 2014 without receiving a salary or expense reimbursement from the city. He served on several committees in the 40th Parliament, including the Cabinet Committee on Strong Economy, the Select Standing Committee on Health, and the Select Standing Committee on Aboriginal Affairs.

He was defeated for re-election in 2017 by NDP candidate Lisa Beare.

== Electoral record ==
2017 British Columbia general election: Maple Ridge-Pitt Meadows
| Party | Candidate | Votes | % | ±% | Expenditures |
|---|---|---|---|---|---|
| New Democratic | Lisa Beare | 12,045 | 44.80 | +1.92 | $60,276 |
| Liberal | Doug Bing | 10,428 | 38.79 | −6.70 | $55,180 |
| Green | Alex Pope | 3,329 | 12.38 | +3.23 | $6,534 |
| Conservative | Gary John O'Driscoll | 676 | 2.51 | +0.03 | |
| Independent | Steve Ranta | 408 | 1.52 | – | $979 |
| Total valid votes | | 26,886 | 100.00 | | |
| Total rejected ballots | | 173 | 0.64 | | |
| Turnout | | 27,059 | 64.50 | | |
Source: Elections BC

2013 British Columbia general election: Maple Ridge-Pitt Meadows
| Party | Candidate | Votes | % | ±% | Expenditures |
|---|---|---|---|---|---|
| Liberal | Doug Bing | 10,824 | 45.49 | -0.26 | $50,220 |
| New Democratic | Elizabeth Joan Rosenau | 10,204 | 42.88 | -4.19 | $61,491 |
| Green | Michael Lawrence Patterson | 2,178 | 9.15 | +3.62 | $1,188 |
| No Affiliation | Manuel "Mike" Pratas | 589 | 2.48 | – | $1,320 |
| Total valid votes | | 23,795 | 100.00 | – | |
| Total rejected ballots | | 184 | 0.77 | +0.14 | |
| Turnout | | 23,979 | 59.87 | +2.97 | |
| Liberal gain from New Democratic | | Swing | | +1.96 | |
Source: Elections BC
