= 2008 British Columbia municipal elections =

Canadian municipal elections

- 15 November 2008

Municipal elections were held in the Canadian province of British Columbia on November 15, 2008.

The following is a list of mayoral races in selected municipalities.

== Abbotsford ==
Candidate	Vote	%
George W. Peary	15186	55.3
Alvin Epp	7120	25.9
Steve Dunton	3360	12.2
Gerda Peachey	1396	5.1
Case Verstraten	420	1.5

== Burnaby ==
Candidate	Vote	%
Derek Corrigan (X)	20365	67
Andrew Robert Chisholm	10110	33

== Campbell River ==
Candidate	Vote	%
Charlie Cornfield	5011	53.7
Terry Calvin Hoff	2305	24.7
Roger A. McDonell (X)	2012	21.6

== Castlegar ==
Candidate	Vote	%
Lawrence D. Chernoff (X)	Acclaimed	

== Central Saanich ==
Candidate	Vote	%
Jack Mar (X)	2606	49.9
Christopher Graham	1437	27.5
Sean McNulty	1184	22.6

== Chilliwack ==
Candidate	Vote	%
Sharon Gaetz	8889	73.2
Wayne Massey	2324	19.1
Norm Smith	925	7.6

== Coldstream ==
Candidate	Vote	%
Jim Garlick	1899	68.5
Glen Taylor	874	31.5

== Colwood ==
Candidate	Vote	%
David A. Saunders	1608	55.1
Carol Hamilton	1309	44.9

== Comox ==
Candidate	Vote	%
Paul Ives	1435	34.5
Dennis Strand	1133	27.2
Don Davis	1085	26.1
Bobbi-Rae Dalsaune-Wells	373	9.0
Norton McBride	136	3.3

== Coquitlam ==
Candidate	Vote	%
Richard Stewart	8807	52
Maxine Wilson (X)	7358	44
Owen Coomer	488	2

== Courtenay ==
Candidate	Vote	%
Greg Phelps	3214	58.5
Starr Winchester (X)	2280	41.5

== Cranbrook ==
Candidate	Vote	%
Scott Manjak	2254	51.0
Wayne Stetski	2050	46.3
John York	119	2.7

== Dawson Creek ==
Candidate	Vote	%
Mike Bernier	1351	47.7
Brent Neumann	828	29.2
Wayne Dahlen	654	23

== Delta ==
Candidate	Vote	%
Lois Jackson (X)	11103	52.4
Krista Engelland	8156	38.5
Mike Reilly	1154	5.5
Blair Clarke	458	2.2
Ray Robinson	303	1.4

== Esquimalt ==
Candidate	Vote	%
Barbara Desjardins	2131	62.5
Chris Clement (X)	1278	37.5

== Fort St. John ==
Candidate	Vote	%
Bruce Lantz	1498	52.7
Jim Eglinski (X)	1342	47.3

== Hope ==
Candidate	Vote	%
Laurie French	829	45.9
Victor Wilfried	810	44.8
Arne Zabell	169	9.3

== Juan de Fuca Electoral Area ==
The results in Capital Regional District Electoral Area H (Juan de Fuca) were as follows:

=== Director election ===
Director candidate	Vote	%
Mike Hicks	852	54.72
Ute Schnarr	705	45.28

== Kamloops ==
Candidate	Vote	%
Peter Milobar	13147	74.1
Murphy Kennedy	3667	20.7
Brian Alexander	921	5.2

== Kelowna ==
Candidate	Vote	%
Sharon Shepherd (X)	12769	75.9
Kim Ouellette	4056	24.1

== Kimberley ==
Candidate	Vote	%
Jim Ogilvie (X)	1219	55.7
Tim Park	968	44.3

== Kitimat ==
Candidate	Vote	%
Joanne Monaghan	1443	56.9
Linda Campbell	1093	43.1

== Ladysmith ==
Candidate	Vote	%
Rob Hutchins (X)	Acclaimed	

== Lake Country ==
Candidate	Vote	%
James Baker (X)	Acclaimed	

== Langford ==
Candidate	Vote	%
Stewart Young (X)	Acclaimed	

== Langley (city) ==
Candidate	Vote	%
Peter Fassbender	2683	76.5
Ron Abgrall	822	23.5

== Langley (district municipality) ==
Candidate	Vote	%
Rick Green	7842	54.3
Kurt Alberts (X)	6588	45.7

== Maple Ridge ==
Candidate	Vote	%
Ernie Daykin	6302	45.4
Michael Sather	3889	28.0
Gordy Robson (X)	3680	26.5

== Merritt ==
Candidate	Vote	%
Susan Roline (X)	1184	60.5
David Laird	647	33.0
Loris Keeler	65	3.3
Angie Koczkur	62	3.2

== Mission ==
Candidate	Vote	%
James Atebe (X)	4483	80.7
Matt Johnson	1070	19.3

== Nanaimo ==
Candidate	Vote	%
John Ruttan	9032	46.2
Diane Brennan	6975	35.7
Gary Korpan (X)	3119	16.0
Larry Iwaskow	413	2.1

== Nelson ==
Candidate	Vote	%
John A. Dooley (X)	1748	50.7
David Aaron	944	27.4
Gordon McAdams	704	20.4
Philip McMillan	55	1.6

== New Westminster ==
Candidate	Vote	%
Wayne Wright (X)	5620	57
Blair Armitage	4238	43

== North Cowichan ==
Candidate	Vote	%
Tom Walker	3062	51.3
Jon Lefebvre (X)	2907	48.7

== North Saanich ==
Candidate	Vote	%
Alice Finall	2466	54.8
Ted Daly (X)	2036	45.2

== North Vancouver (city) ==
Candidate	Vote	%
Darrell Mussatto	Acclaimed	

== North Vancouver (district municipality) ==
Candidate	Vote	%
Richard Walton	Acclaimed	

== Oak Bay ==
Candidate	Vote	%
Christopher Causton (X)	4519	92.5
Ronald Telfer	365	7.5

== Parksville ==
Candidate	Vote	%
Ed F. Mayne	1616	42.2
Kim Burden	1033	27.0
Sandy Herle (X)	779	20.3
Dalls Collis	404	10.5

== Penticton ==
Candidate	Vote	%
Dan Ashton	4704	55.9
Gary Leaman	1793	21.3
Jake Kimberley (X)	1478	17.6
Finn Larsen	339	4.0
Benjamin Wolfe	96	1.1

== Pitt Meadows ==
Candidate	Vote	%
Don MacLean (X)	1488	57.6
Jim Peters	1095	42.4

== Port Alberni ==
Candidate	Vote	%
Ken McRae (X)	2386	63.2
Jen Fisher-Bradley	1079	28.6
Jacques Savard	308	8.2

== Port Coquitlam ==
Candidate	Vote	%
Greg Moore	5949	56.2
Mike Bowen	4473	42.2
Patrick Alambets	169	1.6

== Port Moody ==
Candidate	Vote	%
Joe Trasolini (X)	2780	65.3
Shane Kennedy	1354	31.8
Arthur Crossman	124	2.9

== Powell River ==
Candidate	Vote	%
Stewart Alsgard (X)	1739	
Jeffrey Renn	1078	
Derry Simpson	1000	
Les Magura	241	
Paddy Goggins	191	
Heinz Becker	176	
Michael Ashworth	117	

== Prince George ==
Candidate	Vote	%
Dan Rogers	9270	54.8
Don Zurowski	6505	38.4
Dane Greenwell	573	3.4
Eugene Fetterly	550	3.3

== Prince Rupert ==
Candidate	Vote	%
Jack Mussallem (X)	1919	52
Don Scott	1762	48

== Qualicum Beach ==
Candidate	Vote	%
Teunis Westbroek (X)	2813	73
Wendy Maurer	1043	27

== Quesnel ==
Candidate	Vote	%
Mary Sjostrom	1856	54
Nate Bello (X)	1606	46

== Revelstoke ==
Candidate	Vote	%
David Raven	1458	55.2
William MacFarlane	1000	37.9
Matt Singh	184	7.0

== Richmond ==
Candidate	Vote	%
Malcolm Brodie (X)	19694	73.7
Ivan Gerlach	5207	19.5
Wei Ping Chen	1811	6.8

== Saanich ==
Candidate	Vote	%
Frank Leonard (X)	11972	
Harald Wolf	4665	

== Salmon Arm ==
Candidate	Vote	%
Marty Bootsma (X)	1792	
Charles Nash	1488	
Marg Kentel	1378	
Nancy Cooper	1089	

== Salt Spring Island Electoral Area ==
The results in Capital Regional District Electoral Area F (Salt Spring Island) were as follows:

=== Director election ===
Director candidate	Vote	%
Garth Hendren	1674	50.67
Gary Holman	1630	49.33

== Sechelt ==
Candidate	Vote	%
Darren Inkster	1847	67
Cameron Reid (X)	906	33

== Sidney ==
Candidate	Vote	%
Larry Cross	1807	
Mel Couvelier	839	
Peter Wainwright	641	

== Sooke ==
Candidate	Vote	%
Janet Evans	1597	48.5
Rick Kasper	1284	39.0
Randy Welters	413	12.5

== Southern Gulf Islands Electoral Area ==
The results in Capital Regional District Electoral Area G (Southern Gulf Islands) were as follows:

=== Director election ===
Director candidate	Vote	%
Ken Hancock	1646	65.19
Roy Smith	879	34.81

== Spallumcheen ==
Candidate	Vote	%
Will Hansma (X)	733	59.6
Dustin Griffin	267	21.7
Guenter Rieger	230	18.7

== Squamish ==
Candidate	Vote	%
Greg Gardner	3557	
Terrill Paterson	715	
John Erickson	146	

== Summerland ==
Candidate	Vote	%
Janice Perrino	2183	56.9
Peter Waterman	1651	43.1

== Surrey ==
Candidate	Vote	%
Dianne Watts (X)	51423	85.9
Murray Weisenberger	8465	14.1

== Terrace ==
Candidate	Vote	%
David Pernarowski	1347	48
Jack Talstra (X)	1076	38.3
Murray Hamer	384	13.7

== Trail ==
Candidate	Vote	%
Dieter Bogs (X)	Acclaimed	

== Vancouver ==
Candidate	Vote	%
Gregor Robertson	67598	54.9
Peter Ladner	48794	39.6
Betty Krawczyk	1346	1.1
Marc Emery	1119	0.9
Scott Yee	942	0.8
Patrick Britten	695	0.6
Jeff Kuah	600	0.5
Mike Hansen	483	0.4
Angel Jiminez	320	0.3
Leon Kaplan	299	0.2
Bill Ritchie	252	0.2
Joe Hatoum	241	0.2
Golok Buday	172	0.1
Menard Caissy	137	0.1
R.H. Maxwell N Bur	125	0.1

== Vernon ==
Candidate	Vote	%
Wayne Lippert (X)	2728	
Juliette Cunningham	2363	
Rick Thorburn	825	
Anthony Stamboulieh	787	
Steve Campbell	538	
Floyd Edwards	148	

== Victoria ==
Candidate	Vote	%
Dean Fortin	7706	
Rob Reid	7105	
Steve Filipovic	1411	
Saul Andersen	172	
Kristen Woodruff	149	
Hugh Kruzel	107	
Georgia-Anne Jones	106	
Ron Taylor	83	

== View Royal ==
Candidate	Vote	%
Graham Hill (X)	Acclaimed	

== West Vancouver ==
Candidate	Vote	%
Pam Goldsmith-Jones (X)	3185	33
Vivian Vaughan	2552	22
John Clark	1357	18
Max Clough	3420	27

== Whistler ==
Candidate	Vote	%
Ken Melamed (X)	1527	53
Kristi Wells	1218	42
Brian Walker	63	2
Miro Kolvek	54	1.9
JB Bhandari	3	0.1

== White Rock ==
Candidate	Vote	%
Catherine Ferguson (X)	3738	67.7
Stewart Peddemors	1784	33.3

== Williams Lake ==
Candidate	Vote	%
Kerry Cook (X)	1583	53.3
Paul French	1387	46.7
