= William James Hartley =

Canadian politician

Bill Hartley
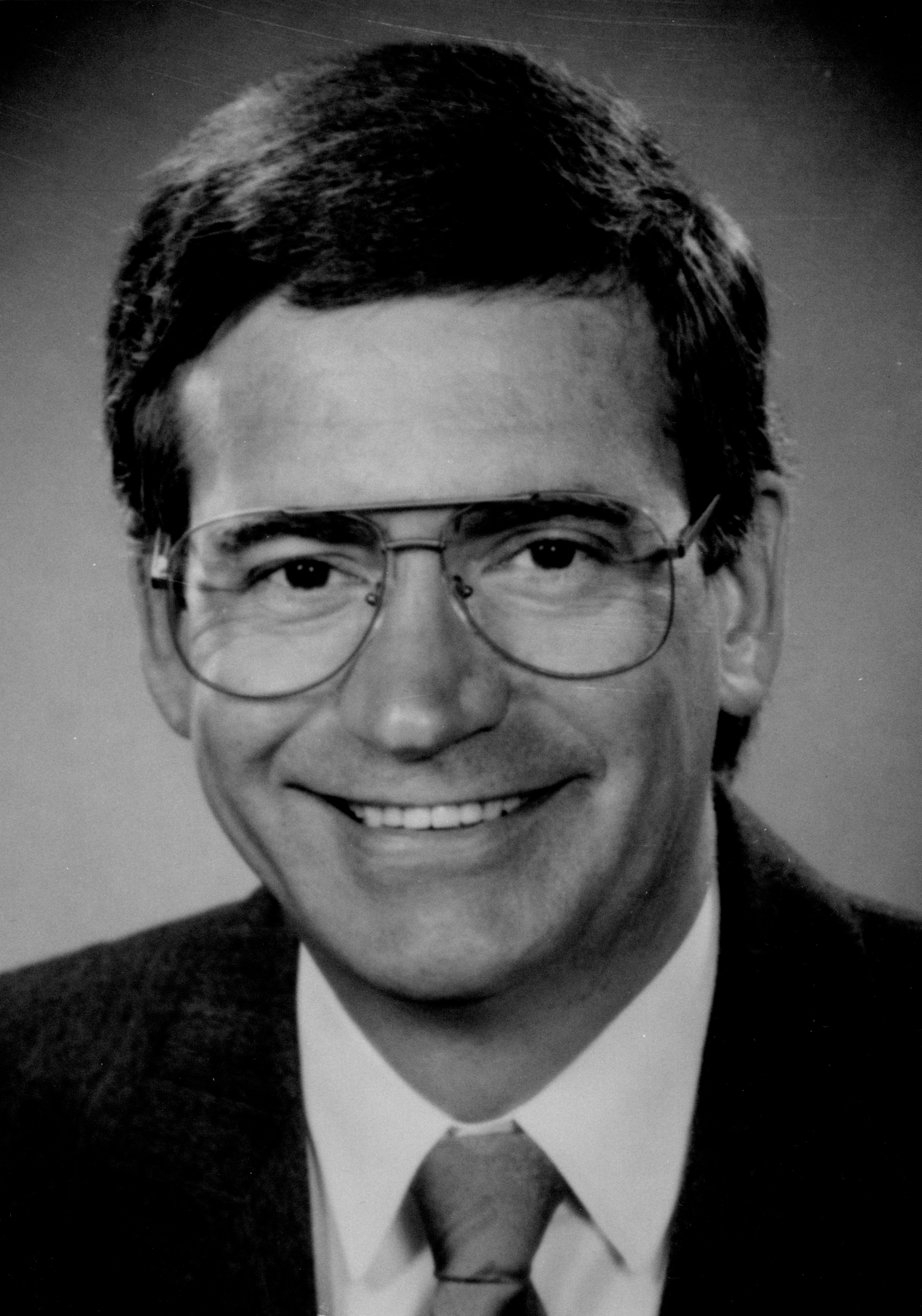

34th Speaker of the Legislative Assembly of British Columbia
- In office March 15, 2000 – May 15, 2001
- Preceded by: Gretchen Brewin
- Succeeded by: Claude Richmond

Member of the British Columbia Legislative Assembly for Maple Ridge-Pitt Meadows
- In office October 7, 1991 – May 16, 2001
- Preceded by: Riding Established
- Succeeded by: Ken Stewart

Personal details
- Born: William James Hartley; June 12, 1945 (age 80) Vancouver, British Columbia
- Party: New Democratic Party

William James "Bill" Hartley (born June 12, 1945) was a child care worker, restaurant owner and political figure in British Columbia, Canada. After being defeated in the riding of Dewdney in the 1986 provincial election, he represented Maple Ridge-Pitt Meadows in the Legislative Assembly of British Columbia from 1991 to 2001 as a member of the NDP. He served as Speaker of the assembly from 2000 to 2001. He previously served as deputy speaker from 1998 to 2000.

He was born in Vancouver, British Columbia, the son of Fred Hartley and Betty MacPherson, and was educated at Simon Fraser University. He served on the town council for Maple Ridge from 1983 to 1987 and was mayor from 1987 to 1990. In 1992, he married Alice Arnot Muir and became a father to Wallis Hartley.
