= Cashore =

Cashore is a surname. Notable people with the surname include:

- John Cashore (born 1935), Canadian United Church minister and former politician
- Kristin Cashore (born 1976), American writer
- William Cashore, Scripps National Spelling Bee champion
