= Prince George City Council =

Governing body of Prince George, British Columbia

Prince George City Council is the governing body for Prince George, in British Columbia, Canada.

The council consists of the mayor and eight councillors.

The councillors are councillors-at-large elected for the entire city.

Municipal elections are held every four years across the province on the third Saturday of October.

== Prince George City Council members ==
=== 2026-2030 ===
- Garth Frizzell, Mayor
- Nicole Fraser, Councillor
- Trudy Klassen, Councillor
- Dan McLaren, Councillor
- Dan Pears, Councillor
- Bob Radloff, Councillor
- Cori Ramsay, Councillor
- Brian Skakun, Councillor
- James Steidle, Councillor

2022-2026

- Simon Yu, Mayor
- Tim Bennett, Councillor
- Garth Frizzell, Councillor
- Trudy Klassen, Councillor
- Ron Polillo, Councillor
- Cori Ramsay, Councillor
- Kyle Sampson, Councillor
- Susan Scott, Councillor
- Brian Skakun, Councillor

2018-2022

- Lyn Hall, Mayor
- Frank Everitt, Councillor
- Garth Frizzell, Councillor
- Murry Krause, Councillor
- Terri McConnachie, Councillor
- Cori Ramsay, Councillor
- Kyle Sampson, Councillor
- Susan Scott, Councillor
- Brian Skakun, Councillor

2014-2018

- Lyn Hall, Mayor
- Frank Everitt, Councillor
- Albert Koehler, Councillor
- Murry Krause, Councillor
- Susan Scott, Councillor
- Brian Skakun, Councillor
- Garth Frizzell, Councillor
- Terri McConnachie, Councillor
- Jillian Merrick, Councillor

2011-2014

- Shari Green, Mayor
- Frank Everitt, Councillor
- Garth Frizzell, Councillor
- Lyn Hall, Councillor
- Albert Koehler, Councillor
- Murry Krause, Councillor
- Brian Skakun, Councillor
- Cameron Stolz, Councillor
- Dave Wilbur, Councillor

2008-2011

- Dan Rogers, Mayor
- Don Bassermann, Councillor
- Garth Frizzell, Councillor
- Shari Green, Councillor
- Murry Krause, Councillor
- Debora Munoz, Councillor
- Brian Skakun, Councillor
- Cameron Stolz, Councillor
- Dave Wilbur, Councillor

2005-2008

- Colin Kinsley, Mayor
- Don Bassermann, Councillor
- Shirley Gratton, Councillor
- Murry Krause, Councillor
- Debora Munoz, Councillor
- Glen Scott, Councillor
- Sherry Sethen, Councillor
- Brian Skakun, Councillor
- Don Zurowski, Councillor

2002-2005

- Colin Kinsley, Mayor
- Don Bassermann, Councillor
- Cliff Dezell, Councillor
- Murry Krause, Councillor
- Dan Rogers, Councillor
- Glen Scott, Councillor
- Sherry Sethen, Councillor
- Brian Skakun, Councillor
- Don Zurowski, Councillor
