= John Cashore =

Canadian politician (born 1935)

The Reverend John Cashore
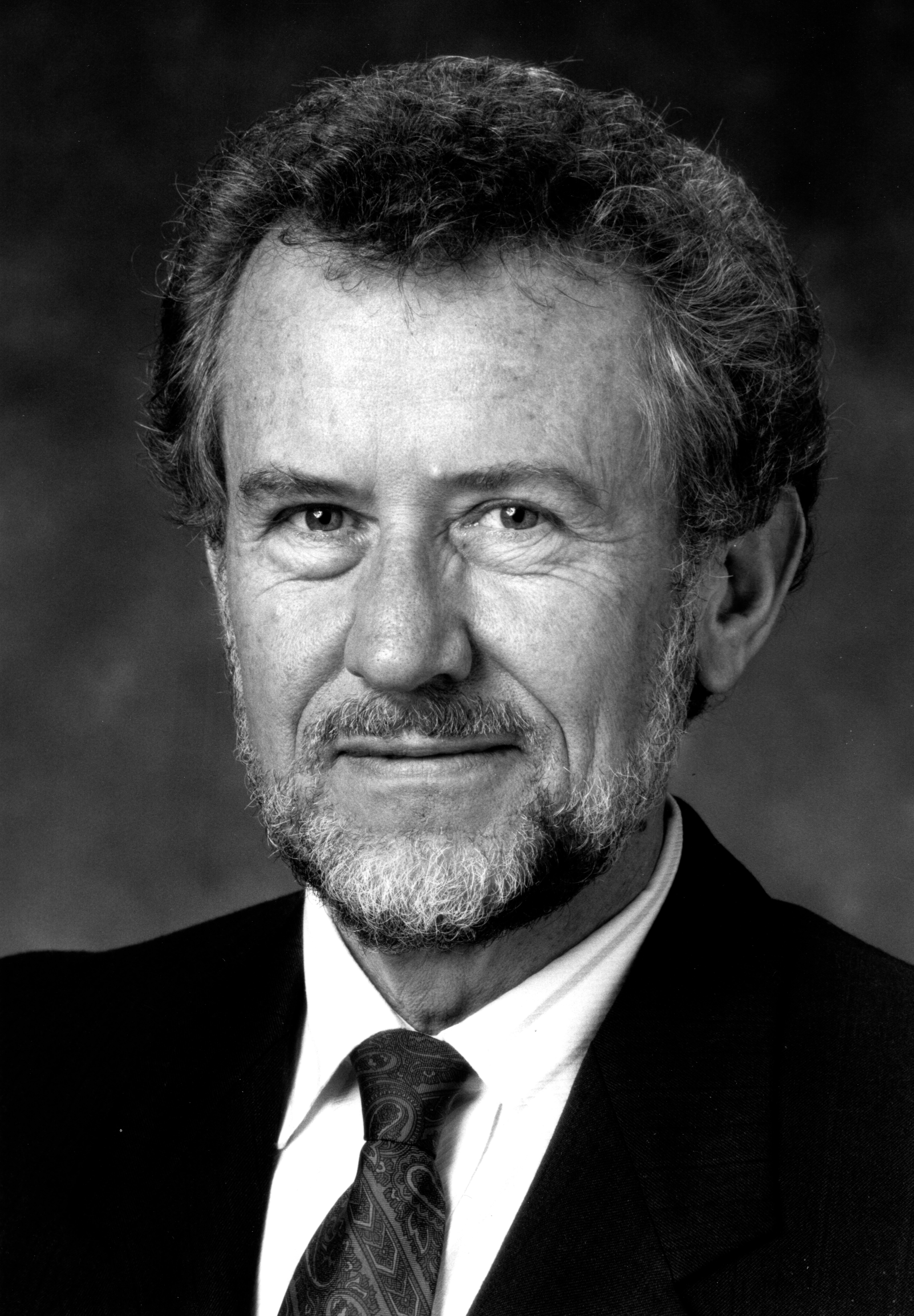

Member of the British Columbia Legislative Assembly for Coquitlam-Maillardville Maillardville-Coquitlam (1986-1991)
- In office October 22, 1986 – May 16, 2001
- Preceded by: John Michael Parks
- Succeeded by: Richard Stewart

Personal details
- Born: March 26, 1935 (age 91) Lethbridge, Alberta
- Party: New Democrat

John Massey Cashore (born March 26, 1935) is a United Church minister and former politician in British Columbia. He represented Maillardville-Coquitlam from 1986 to 1991 and Coquitlam-Maillardville from 1991 to 2001 in the Legislative Assembly of British Columbia as a New Democratic Party (NDP) member.

Cashore was born in Lethbridge, Alberta, the son of John Harvey Cashore and Sarah Mildred Massey, and was educated at the University of British Columbia and Union College. In 1961, he married Sharon Elizabeth Cunliffe. They moved to Coquitlam, British Columbia, in 1973. He served in the provincial cabinet as Minister of Aboriginal Affairs, as Minister of Labour, as Minister of Environment, Lands and Parks, and briefly as Minister of Multiculturalism and Human Rights. He also served as parliamentary secretary to the Minister of Education. In 2005, he became a member of the advisory council for the Georgia Strait Alliance.
