= John Michael Parks =

Canadian politician (born 1946)

MLA for Maillardville-Coquitlam
- In office 1983–1986
- Preceded by: Norman Levi
- Succeeded by: John Cashore

Personal details
- Born: March 2, 1946 (age 80) Vancouver, British Columbia
- Party: Social Credit Party of British Columbia
- Education: B.Comm, LLB
- Alma mater: UBC, Vancouver

John Michael Parks (born March 2, 1946) is a former Canadian politician. He served in the 33rd Legislative Assembly of British Columbia from 1983 to 1986 as a Social Credit member for the constituency of Maillardville-Coquitlam.
