= Maple Ridge-Pitt Meadows =

Provincial electoral district in British Columbia, Canada

British Columbia electoral district
- Interactive map of riding boundaries

Provincial electoral district
- Legislature: Legislative Assembly of British Columbia
MLA
Doug Morneau
Conservative
- First contested: 1991
- Last contested: 2026

Demographics
- Population (2021): 58,752
- Area (km²): 1,996
- Pop. density (per km²): 29.4
- Census division(s): Fraser Valley, Metro Vancouver
- Census subdivision(s): Maple Ridge (part), Pitt Meadows, Katzie

Maple Ridge-Pitt Meadows is a provincial electoral district for the Legislative Assembly of British Columbia.

Established under the 1991 electoral redistribution, the district was first contested in the 1991 general election. It was created from parts of Dewdney. The 2008 re-distribution saw an amalgamation of the old Maple Ridge-Pitt Meadows riding with a small portion of Maple Ridge-Mission.

== Demographics ==
Population, 2021	58,752
Area (km^{2})	1,996
Pop. density (people per km^{2})	29
Source: BC Electoral Boundaries Commission

== Geography ==
Located in Metro Vancouver, the district comprises the city of Pitt Meadows and the western part of Maple Ridge. It also includes the communities of Williams Landing and Alvin, as well as part of the Fraser Valley Regional District. Its southern boundary follows the Fraser River, while the Pitt River forms part of its eastern boundary.

== Members of the Legislative Assembly ==
This riding has elected the following members of the Legislative Assembly:

Assembly	Years	Member	Party
Maple Ridge-Pitt Meadows; Riding created from Dewdney
35th	1991–1996	William James Hartley	New Democratic
36th	1996–2001	William James Hartley	New Democratic
37th	2001–2005	Ken Stewart	Liberal
38th	2005–2009	Michael Sather	New Democratic
39th	2009–2013	Michael Sather	New Democratic
40th	2013–2017	Doug Bing	Liberal
41st	2017–2020	Lisa Beare	New Democratic
42nd	2020–2024	Lisa Beare	New Democratic
43rd	2024–2026	Lisa Beare	New Democratic
44th	2026–present	Doug Morneau	Conservative

== Election results ==
2026 British Columbia general election
Party	Candidate	Votes	%	±%	Expenditures
Conservative	Doug Morneau	10,837	48.24	+3.19	
New Democratic	Lisa Beare	9,987	44.46	-10.39	
CentreBC	Jordan Simmons	822	3.66	-	
OneBC	Susan Einarsson	773	3.44	-	
Total valid votes		22,419	99.80		
Total rejected ballots		45	0.20		
Turnout					
Registered voters					
Conservative gain from New Democratic		Swing		+6.79	
Source: Elections BC

2024 British Columbia general election
Party	Candidate	Votes	%	±%	Expenditures
New Democratic	Lisa Beare	14,480	54.89	-9.1	$50,684.56
Conservative	Mike Morden	11,901	45.11	–	$38,078.29
Total valid votes/expense limit		26,381	99.64	–	$71,700.08
Total rejected ballots		94	0.36	–	
Turnout		26,475	59.03	–	
Registered voters		44,850			
New Democratic notional hold		Swing		-27.1	
Source: Elections BC

2020 provincial election redistributed results
Party	%
New Democratic	64.0
Liberal	36.0

2020 British Columbia general election
Party	Candidate	Votes	%	±%	Expenditures
New Democratic	Lisa Beare	15,877	63.41	+18.61	$47,200.48
Liberal	Cheryl Ashlie	9,163	36.59	−2.21	$42,453.66
Total valid votes		25,040	100.00	–	
Total rejected ballots					
Turnout					
Registered voters					
Source: Elections BC

2017 British Columbia general election
Party	Candidate	Votes	%	±%	Expenditures
New Democratic	Lisa Beare	12,045	44.80	+1.92	$60,276
Liberal	Doug Bing	10,428	38.79	−6.70	$55,180
Green	Alex Pope	3,329	12.38	+3.23	$6,534
Conservative	Gary John O'Driscoll	676	2.51	+0.03	
Independent	Steve Ranta	408	1.52	–	$979
Total valid votes		26,886	100.00		
Total rejected ballots		173	0.64		
Turnout		27,059	64.50		
Source: Elections BC

2013 British Columbia general election
Party	Candidate	Votes	%	±%	Expenditures
Liberal	Doug Bing	10,824	45.49	-0.26	$50,220
New Democratic	Elizabeth Joan Rosenau	10,204	42.88	-4.19	$61,491
Green	Michael Lawrence Patterson	2,178	9.15	+3.62	$1,188
No Affiliation	Manuel "Mike" Pratas	589	2.48	–	$1,320
Total valid votes		23,795	100.00	–	
Total rejected ballots		184	0.77	+0.14	
Turnout		23,979	59.87	+2.97	
Liberal gain from New Democratic		Swing		+1.96	
Source: Elections BC

- Pratas campaigned with the BC Conservative Party but was listed as "No affiliation" on the ballot.

2009 British Columbia general election
Party	Candidate	Votes	%	±%
New Democratic	Michael Sather	9232	46.91	+0.53
Liberal	Ken Stewart	9062	46.04	+3.30
Green	Rob Hornsey	1064	5.41	−1.95
Independent	Chum Richardson	194	0.99	–
Refederation	Jay Ariken	129	0.66	–

2005 British Columbia general election
Party	Candidate	Votes	%
New Democratic	Michael Sather	11,786	46.38
Liberal	Ken Stewart	10,861	42.74
Green	Mike Gildersleeve	1,869	7.36
Democratic Reform	Rick Butler	534	2.10
Marijuana	Denise Briere-Smart	360	1.42
Total		25,410	100.00

2001 British Columbia general election
Party	Candidate	Votes	%	Expenditures
Liberal	Ken Stewart	12,235	52.96	$39,898
New Democratic	Bill Hartley	5,764	24.95	$22,812
Green	Mike Gildersleeve	3,069	13.29	$2,437
Unity	Dave Hensman	1,220	5.28	$7,515
Marijuana	Rick Cameron	716	3.10	$394
Action	Michael Felgner	97	0.42	$300
Total valid votes		23,101	100.00	
Total rejected ballots		77	0.33	
Turnout		23,178	72.90	

1996 British Columbia general election
Party	Candidate	Votes	%	Expenditures
New Democratic	Bill Hartley	12,946	46.07	$34,860
Liberal	Ken Stewart	10,960	39.00	$52,898
Progressive Democrat	Peter Neufeld	2,011	7.16	$412
Reform	Nick Walsh	1,470	5.23	–
Green	Richard Hennick	464	1.65	$100
Libertarian	Lewis Clarke Dahlby	158	0.56	–
Natural Law	Matt Deacon	90	0.32	$118
Total valid votes		28,099	100.00	
Total rejected ballots		137	0.49	
Turnout		28,236	73.30	

1991 British Columbia general election
Party	Candidate	Votes	%	Expenditures
New Democratic	Bill Hartley	11,591	45.16	$28,734
Liberal	Steve Gilmore	8,786	34.23	$5,377
Social Credit	Roman Evancic	4,986	19.42	$26,959
Green	David B. Pehota	305	1.19	$310
Total valid votes		25,668	100.00	
Total rejected ballots		335	1.29	
Turnout		26,003	77.02	
New Democratic notional gain from Social Credit		Swing		N/A

== See also ==
- List of British Columbia provincial electoral districts
- Canadian provincial electoral districts
