= Doug Morneau =

Canadian politician

Doug Morneau MLA

Member of the Legislative Assembly for Maple Ridge-Pitt Meadows
- Incumbent
- Assumed office October 24, 2026
- Preceded by: Lisa Beare

Personal details
- Party: Conservative
- Website: website

Doug Morneau MLA is a Canadian politician who is the Member of the British Columbia Legislative Assembly for Maple Ridge-Pitt Meadows since the 2026 British Columbia general election. A graduate of Vancouver Island University where he earned his Red Seal, Morneau is a former tradesperson, business owner and technology consultant, and served on the board of the BC Assessment Authority. He is also the host of the Real Marketing Real Fast podcast, the author of Three Big Lies: The Truth About Renting Email Lists to Generate Leads and Sales and Prescribed To Death – How I Eliminated Five Medications And Saved My Life, founder of Faith Forward Partners, and a CrossFit athlete. Moreau is a card-carrying United Steelworkers member and advised numerous organizations, including Bell Media, the British Columbia Automobile Association, and Lafarge.

== Electoral record ==
2026 British Columbia general election: Maple Ridge-Pitt Meadows
Party	Candidate	Votes	%	±%	Expenditures
Conservative	Doug Morneau	11,780	48.33	+3.22	
New Democratic	Lisa Beare	10,873	44.61	–10.28	
CentreBC	Jordan Simmons	892	3.66	–	
OneBC	Susan Einarsson	829	3.40	–	
Total valid votes		24,374	99.73	–	
Total rejected ballots		65	0.27	–0.09	
Turnout		24,439	53.01	–6.02	
Registered voters		46,099			
Conservative gain from New Democratic		Swing		+6.75	
Source: Elections BC
