= Fraser Mills =

Human settlement in Coquitlam, British Columbia, Canada

Coordinates: 49°14′00″N 122°51′00″W

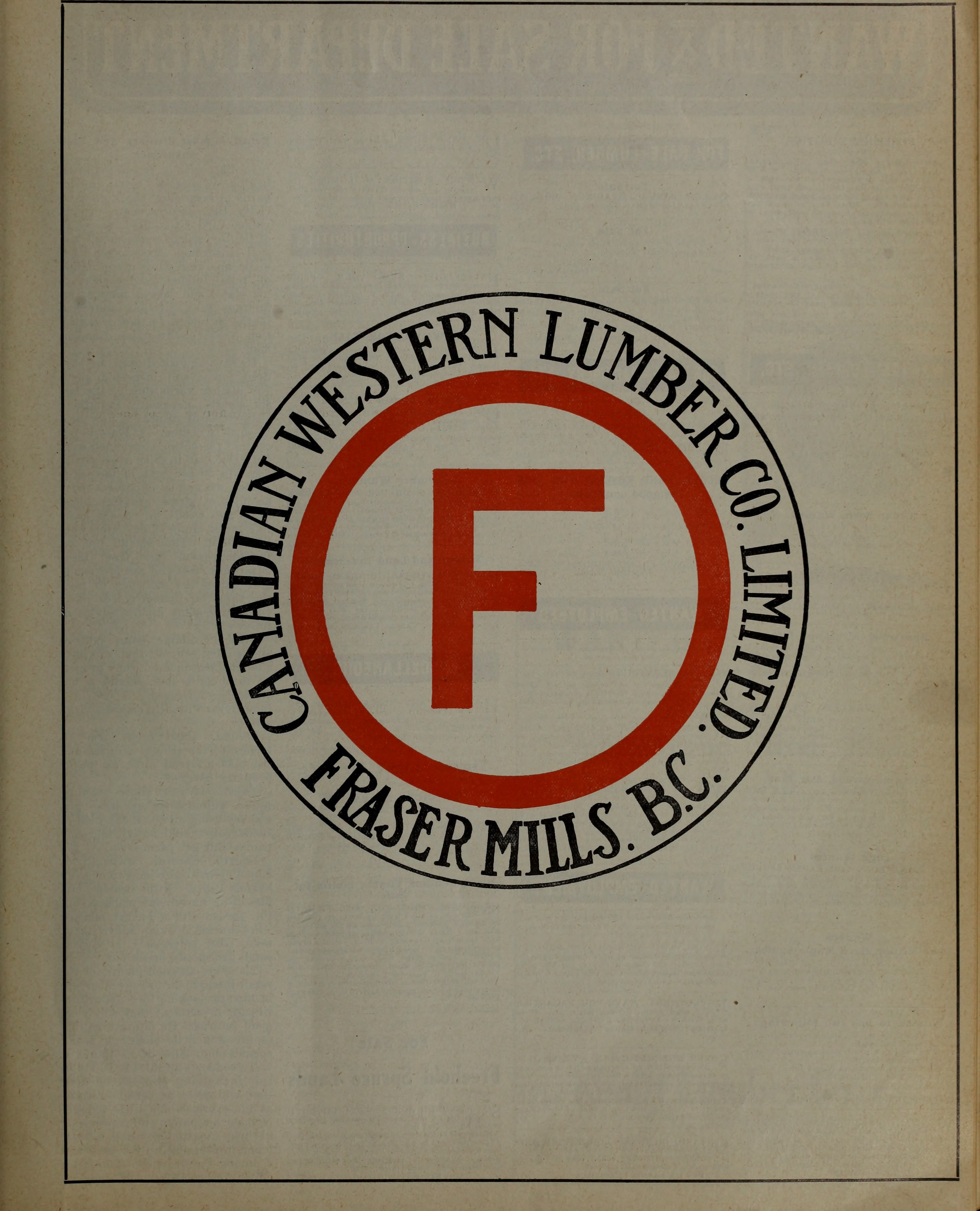
Fraser Mills company logo

Fraser Mills was a municipality in British Columbia on the north bank of the Fraser River that was incorporated in 1913, but has since amalgamated with the City of Coquitlam.

Fraser Mills is also the name of a new masterplanned community on the same site. It will include 15 separate multi-unit buildings, a bus station connecting to Braid station, sports recreation and commercial amenities and a 16-acre park. This project will be the only waterfront community in Coquitlam.

== History ==
Located on the northern shore of the Fraser River, the area was originally the site of a sawmill. The mill was known at first as the Ross McLaren Mill and opened in 1889. However, it soon closed after co-founder James McLaren died. The site remained unused for many years until the mill was reopened as the Fraser River Sawmills. Due to a labour shortage, 400 francophones were recruited from Quebec and settled in an area just north of the mill now known as Maillardville. Similarly in the early 20th century, many Punjabi Sikhs came to work in the mills and settled on the south slope of Coquitlam.

During the Great Depression, many workers were laid off. Wage reductions were imposed on the remaining workforce and led to a ten-week strike. The mill eventually closed in 2001.

== Location ==
The Fraser Mills neighbourhood is located in the southwestern part of Coquitlam and south of the Maillardville neighbourhood, which was founded as a townsite for the workers at the large lumber mill whose grounds comprised Fraser Mills. It was just east of the boundary of the City of New Westminster and mostly on the south side of the Trans-Canada and Lougheed Highways. The site for many years after its abandonment was the Terranova landfill for Greater Vancouver waste disposal. The land has since become a focus for big-box store development along United Boulevard, which has come to serve as an alternate route for traffic bypassing jams on the adjacent freeway and highway.

The city has designated the area as Waterfront Village Centre and has re-zoned it to include both commercial and residential use. Beedie is planning to develop 5,500 residential units on the land.

== See also ==
- List of company towns
