= Festival du Bois =

- Genre: Francophone festival
- Dates: Final weekend in March
- Locations: Maillardville, Coquitlam, British Columbia, Canada
- Years active: March 1990 – present
- Website: FestivalduBois.ca/

Festival du Bois is an annual Francophone festival held in the Maillardville neighbourhood of Coquitlam, British Columbia, Canada. In 2025, Festival du Bois was held from March 7 to 9. Produced by Societe francophone de Maillardville, the festival celebrates French Canadian history, art and culture.

== Festival ==
The festival site in Mackin Park includes a main stage tent where mostly Canadian folk, Celtic, and world music artists perform. There is also a children's stage, a workshop tent, art and history displays, tours of the Mackin House Museum, and traditional food including tourtière, poutine, smoked meat sandwiches, maple taffy, and maple sugar pies.

The "Festival du Bois headgear" is a green tuque embossed with a frog.

Over 17,000 people attended Festival du Bois in 2008, and was recognized as one of the "biggest festivals and cultural events in Metro Vancouver" by Business in Vancouver magazine.
