= Michael Sather =

Canadian politician (1947/1948–2026)

Member of the British Columbia Legislative Assembly for Maple Ridge-Pitt Meadows
- In office May 17, 2005 – May 14, 2013
- Preceded by: Ken Stewart
- Succeeded by: Doug Bing

Personal details
- Born: 1947 or 1948 Grande Prairie, Alberta, Canada
- Died: March 27, 2026 (aged 78) Maple Ridge, British Columbia, Canada
- Party: NDP

Michael Sather (1947 or 1948 – March 27, 2026) was a Canadian politician who was a MLA for Maple Ridge-Pitt Meadows in the province of British Columbia. As a member of the British Columbia New Democratic Party, he was elected to the Legislative Assembly in the 2005 election, and was re-elected in 2009.

== Life and career ==
Sather had a bachelor of science degree in biology and a master's degree in psychology. He moved to B.C. in 1974 and worked on fishing boats and oil rigs, owned and operated a wilderness tourism business, and worked as a mental health therapist.

In November 2008, he ran for mayor of Maple Ridge, finishing second to Ernie Daykin.

In August 2011, Sather announced he would not run for re-election in 2013, but would finish out his term.

Sather died on March 27, 2026, at the age of 78.
