= Jennifer Blatherwick =

Canadian politician

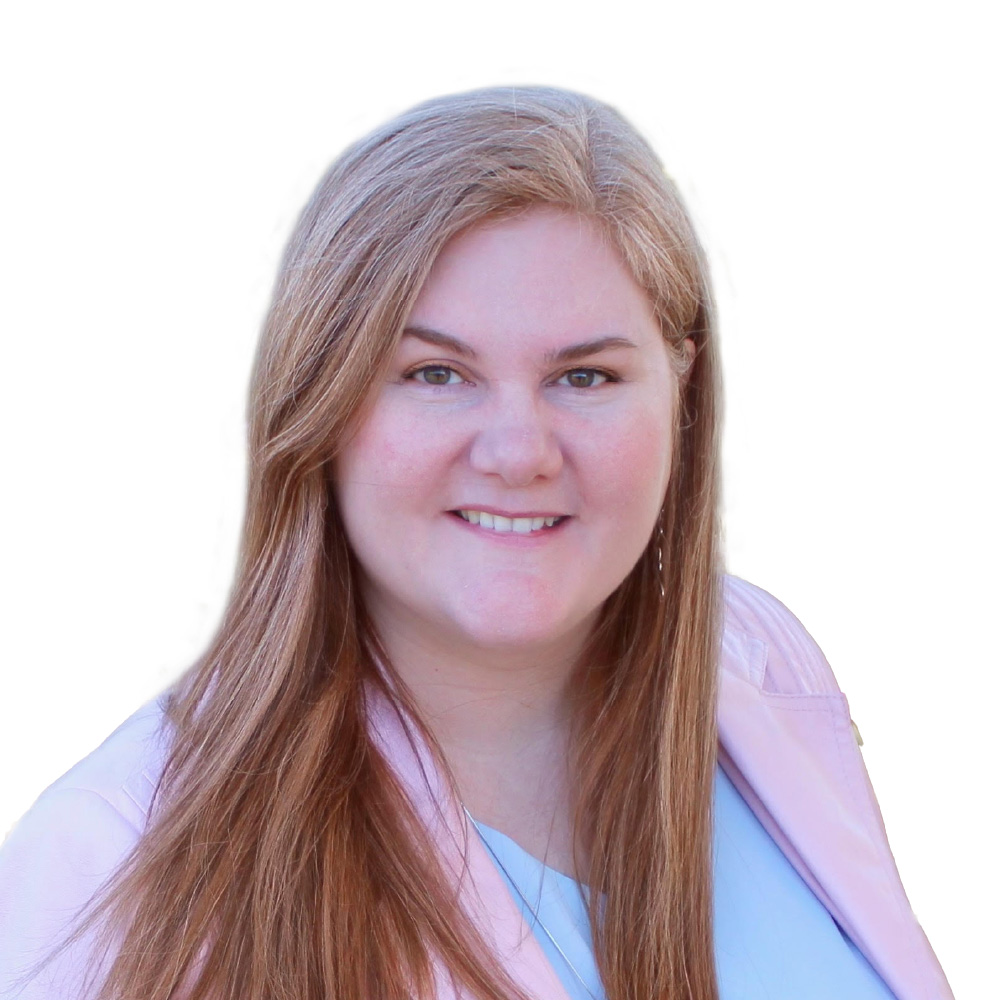
- Campaign portrait, 2024

Parliamentary Secretary for Gender Equity of British Columbia
- Incumbent
- Assumed office November 18, 2024
- Premier: David Eby
- Preceded by: Kelli Paddon

Member of the British Columbia Legislative Assembly for Coquitlam-Maillardville
- In office October 19, 2024 – October 24, 2026
- Preceded by: Selina Robinson
- Succeeded by: Matt Liang

Personal details
- Born: 1975 (age 50–51)
- Party: BC NDP
- Children: 5

Jennifer Blatherwick is a Canadian politician who served as a member of the Legislative Assembly of British Columbia (MLA) representing the electoral district of Coquitlam–Maillardville from 2024 to 2026. A member of the New Democratic Party, she was appointed Parliamentary Secretary for Gender Equity in 2024.

== Early life and career ==
Blatherwick lives in Coquitlam with her husband and five children. She was elected twice in Coquitlam as a School District 43 trustee.

She has also served on the board of ACCESS Youth, as a director of the Coquitlam Foundation, and on multiple other committees in the Tri-Cities area.

Blatherwick was formerly the Director of the B.C. Chapter of Odyssey of the Mind.

She is a recipient of the Sovereign's Medal for Volunteers.

== Electoral history ==
2026 British Columbia general election: Coquitlam-Maillardville
Party	Candidate	Votes	%	±%	Expenditures
Conservative	Matt Liang	9,626	49.49	+9.92	
New Democratic	Jennifer Blatherwick	8,057	41.42	-10.38	
Green	Nicola Spurling	1,732	8.90	+2.58	
Total valid votes		19,415	99.81		
Total rejected ballots		36	0.19		
Turnout					
Registered voters					
Conservative gain from New Democratic		Swing		+10.15	
Source: Elections BC

2024 British Columbia general election: Coquitlam-Maillardville
Party	Candidate	Votes	%	±%	Expenditures
New Democratic	Jennifer Blatherwick	11,972	51.80	−7.3	$41,913.64
Conservative	Hamed Najafi	9,146	39.57	+39.2	$25,819.55
Green	Nicola Spurling	1,461	6.32	−5.3	$4,924.24
Independent	Ken Holowanky	535	2.31	–	$2,571.63
Total valid votes/expense limit		23,114	99.89	–	$71,700.08
Total rejected ballots		26	0.11	–	
Turnout		23,140	56.90	–	
Registered voters		40,666			
New Democratic notional hold		Swing		−23.2	
Source: Elections BC

== See also ==
- 43rd Parliament of British Columbia
