= Richard Stewart =

Canadian politician

His Worship Richard Stewart
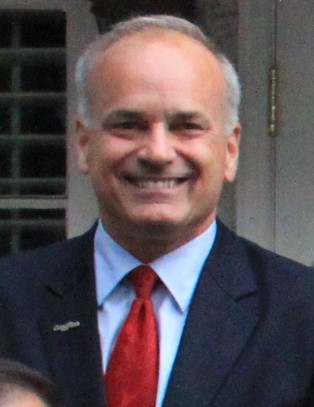
- Stewart in 2014

Mayor of Coquitlam
- In office December 1, 2008 – November 9, 2026
- Preceded by: Maxine Wilson
- Succeeded by: Craig Hodge

Coquitlam City Councillor
- In office November 19, 2005 – December 1, 2008

Member of the Legislative Assembly of British Columbia for Coquitlam-Maillardville
- In office 2001–2005
- Preceded by: John Cashore
- Succeeded by: Diane Thorne

Personal details
- Born: July 31, 1959 (age 67) New Westminster, British Columbia, Canada
- Party: BC Liberals
- Spouse: Anna Rosa Stewart (m. 1983)
- Children: 4
- Education: Simon Fraser University
- Occupation: Politician, Entrepreneur
- Website: RichardStewart.ca

Richard Stewart (born July 31, 1959) is a Canadian politician and entrepreneur who served as the mayor for the city of Coquitlam, British Columbia from 2008 to 2026. He was elected to Coquitlam City Council in 2005, and became mayor in 2008.

== Personal life ==
He was married in April 1983 to Anna Rosa, and they have four children. Stewart has served his community in the provincial government as MLA for Coquitlam-Maillardville from 2001 to 2005; appointed MLA Responsible for Francophone Affairs, member of the Government Caucus Committee on the Economy, and Chair of the Select Standing Committee on Education.

Stewart is bilingual, speaking English and French.

Stewart has experience as a community volunteer in a large number of social, service, environmental, business and community organizations, including the Coquitlam Rotary Club, the Knights of Columbus, the Maillardville Lions Club, the Société Maillardville Uni and Société Francophone de Maillardville.

== Career ==
Stewart was previously President of the Canadian Home Builders' Association of British Columbia, Chair of the National Housing Economic Research Council, a member of the BC Minister's Advisory Council on Affordable Housing, a member of National and BC Building Code Committees, and a member of the National Research Council Canada's Standing Committee on Housing.

At the local government level, Stewart has served on Economic Development Committees, on a local Advisory Design Panel, on Housing Committees, and as a Trustee on the Coquitlam Public Library Board. Stewart is a writer, and has operated his own publishing, government relations and communications business.

In 2004, MLA Elayne Brenzinger, then an independent, accused Stewart of improper conduct, claiming he had groped her. Brenzinger later retracted the allegations and issued an apology.

On November 15, 2008, Stewart was elected as mayor of Coquitlam in the British Columbia municipal elections, beating out incumbent Maxine Wilson.

In 2016, Stewart revealed that he had been wearing the same suit to work events for the past fifteen months, in an effort to highlight the double standard that women in the public sphere, particularly in politics, are subject to over their appearance. He stated that while he had heard of female colleagues at both the municipal and provincial levels of government receiving negative comments about their outfits and hairstyles, particularly when they re-used outfits, he had never heard of a male politician receiving similar comments. Although his original intention was to carry on until someone noticed, he went public after fifteen months because "I was wearing the same suit to every meeting and (there was) no indication that anyone was ever going to notice."

In 2022, the Metro Vancouver Regional District, of which Coquitlam is a member, became involved in a dispute with construction company Acciona over a building project in North Vancouver. In fall 2022, a lawsuit filed by Metro Vancouver alleged that Anika Calder, the daughter of Coquitlam city manager Peter Steblin and an employee with Acciona, had used Stewart's login and password access confidential legal documents relating to this dispute, then provided copies of the documents to Acciona. As of May 2023, the city council has not commented on the allegations officially. In an interview in January 2023, Stewart stated that the details presented by Metro Vancouver "aren't entirely accurate," and suggested that additional information would be presented at trial.

On September 4, 2026, Stewart filed a lawsuit filed against Metro Vancouver and its chief administrative officer, Jerry Dobrovolny, because they had implied that Stewart had played a role in the confidentiality breach in 2022, when they knew that not to be true.

On October 14, 2026, Stewart announced that he would not seek re-election after five terms in office as mayor. His mayorship ended on November 9, 2026.

=== City Councillor committees ===
- Chair of the Livable Communities Advisory Committee
- Chair of the Disability Issues Advisory Committee
- Chair of the Maillardville Revitalization Committee
- Member of the GVRD Labour Relations Bureau
- Chair of the Parcel Tax Review Panel
- Council representative to the Fraser-Burrard Community Justice Society
- Member of the Executive of Lower Mainland Municipal Association
