= Maillardville =

Neighbourhood in Coquitlam, British Columbia, Canada

- Neighbourhood of Coquitlam
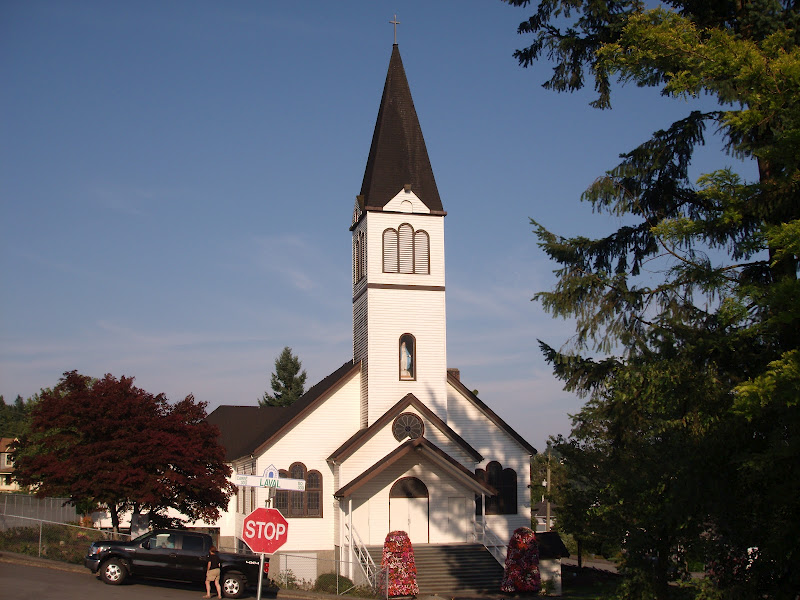
- Notre Dame de Lourdes Church on Laval Square

- Location of Maillardville within Metro Vancouver
- Coordinates: 49.2374°N 122.867°W
- Country: Canada
- Province: British Columbia
- Region: Lower Mainland
- Regional district: Metro Vancouver
- City: Coquitlam
- Named for: Edmond Maillard

Government
  - Mayor: Craig Hodge
  - MP (Fed.): Jake Sawatzky (Liberal)
  - MLA (Prov.): Matt Liang (BC Conservative)

Population (2021)
  - Total: 15,837
- Time zone: UTC−7 (PCT)
- Postal code span: V3K
- Area codes: 604, 778, 236, 672
- Website: maillardville.com

Maillardville is a community on the south slope of the city of Coquitlam, British Columbia, Canada.

== History ==
In 1889, Frank Ross and James McLaren opened a $350,000 (equivalent to $12,911,125 in 2025) modern lumber mill on the north bank of the Fraser River; a town of 20 houses, a store, post office, hospital, office block, barber shop, pool hall, and a Sikh temple would grow around the mill. A mill manager's residence was built that later became Place des Arts. A second mill manager's residence was built in 1909 and is now known as Mackin House, a historic house museum operated by the Coquitlam Heritage Society.

In 1909, Ross and McLaren, in search of workers for the Canadian Western Lumber Company, recruited a contingent of 110 French Canadian mill workers from Eastern Ontario and Quebec. Approximately 40 French Canadian families settled in present-day Maillardville in 1909, with another contingent arriving in June 1910. Named for Father Edmond Maillard, a young Oblate from France, the neighbourhood became the largest Francophone centre west of Manitoba. Similarly, in the early 1900s, many Punjabis came to work in the mills and settled on the south slope of Coquitlam.

In 1971, the city of Coquitlam and the village of Fraser Mills were amalgamated, which gave the city a larger tax base. The mill closed in 2001 and is now rezoned into a residential area. Maillardville's past is recognized today in street names, the Francophone education system and French immersion programs, French-language guides and scouts, and celebrations such as Festival du Bois.

Maillardville celebrated its 100th birthday in 2009.

In 2014, the city of Coquitlam updated the Maillardville neighbourhood plan. The city anticipates a population growth of 6,000 over the next two decades.

== Geography ==
Maillardville is bordered by Austin Avenue to the north and Lougheed Highway to the south. To the west it is flanked by Blue Mountain Street, while to the east it is bordered by Mundy Road. The town centre of Maillardville is situated in the southwest corner of the neighbourhood, on Brunette Avenue between Lougheed Highway and Woolridge Street.

== Demographics ==
=== Population ===
Population history
Year	Pop.	±%
1991	11,978	—
1996	12,873	+7.5%
2001	13,822	+7.4%
2006	14,005	+1.3%
2011	14,779	+5.5%
2016	14,975	+1.3%
2021	15,837	+5.8%
Source: Statistics Canada

=== Ethnicity ===
Panethnic groups in Maillardville (1996−2021)
Panethnic group	2021		2016		2011		2006		2001		1996	
Panethnic group	Pop.	%	Pop.	%	Pop.	%	Pop.	%	Pop.	%	Pop.	%
European (Note: Statistic includes all persons that did not make up part of a visible minority or an indigenous identity.)	7,385	46.93%	7,905	53.63%	8,845	60.48%	9,545	68.92%	10,095	74.06%	9,770	76.96%
East Asian (Note: Statistic includes total responses of "Chinese", "Korean", and "Japanese" under visible minority section on census.)	3,610	22.94%	2,825	19.17%	2,270	15.52%	1,880	13.57%	1,650	12.11%	1,190	9.37%
South Asian	1,350	8.58%	980	6.65%	800	5.47%	710	5.13%	455	3.34%	690	5.44%
Southeast Asian (Note: Statistic includes total responses of "Filipino" and "Southeast Asian" under visible minority section on census.)	1,255	7.98%	1,275	8.65%	975	6.67%	645	4.66%	600	4.4%	420	3.31%
Middle Eastern (Note: Statistic includes total responses of "West Asian" and "Arab" under visible minority section on census.)	675	4.29%	475	3.22%	560	3.83%	285	2.06%	265	1.94%	90	0.71%
Indigenous	390	2.48%	445	3.02%	455	3.11%	225	1.62%	230	1.69%	230	1.81%
Latin American	330	2.1%	280	1.9%	155	1.06%	200	1.44%	105	0.77%	105	0.83%
African	310	1.97%	245	1.66%	360	2.46%	225	1.62%	175	1.28%	95	0.75%
Other/multiracial (Note: Statistic includes total responses of "Visible minority, n.i.e." and "Multiple visible minorities" under visible minority section on census.)	445	2.83%	295	2%	205	1.4%	135	0.97%	60	0.44%	90	0.71%
Total responses	15,735	99.36%	14,740	98.43%	14,625	98.96%	13,850	98.89%	13,630	98.61%	12,695	98.62%
Total population	15,837	100%	14,975	100%	14,779	100%	14,005	100%	13,822	100%	12,873	100%
Note: Totals greater than 100% due to multiple origin responses.

=== Language ===
Languages spoken in Maillardville (2016)
Language	%
English	59.5%
Korean	5.1%
Mandarin	4.7%
Cantonese	4.7%
Tagalog	4.1%
Punjabi	3.2%
Persian	2.4%
French	1.8%
Other	14.6%
Total %	100%

== Media ==
They Dream, a Canadian feature-length film set in and around Maillardville (including Place des Arts and Mackin House Museum) was shot over the summer of 2012. Written and directed by Vancouver filmmaker Gord Stanfield, They Dream is the story of a 20-year-old art student, David Dubois, his love affair with a mysterious woman Lisa Reese, and his tragic past. Jean Ory reminds David he can't escape the truth. Lisa and Jean were lifetime residents of Maillardville. They Dream's lead cast includes Jason Mireau, Delia Tatiana and Moishe Teichman.

== Notable people ==
- Lucille Starr, who was inducted to the Canadian Country Music Hall of Fame in 1987 began her musical career in Maillardville with the group Les Hirondelles. A street in Coquitlam "Lucille Starr Way" is named in her honour.
- Shawn Farquhar, magician

== See also ==
- Franco-Columbian
