= Diane Thorne =

Canadian politician

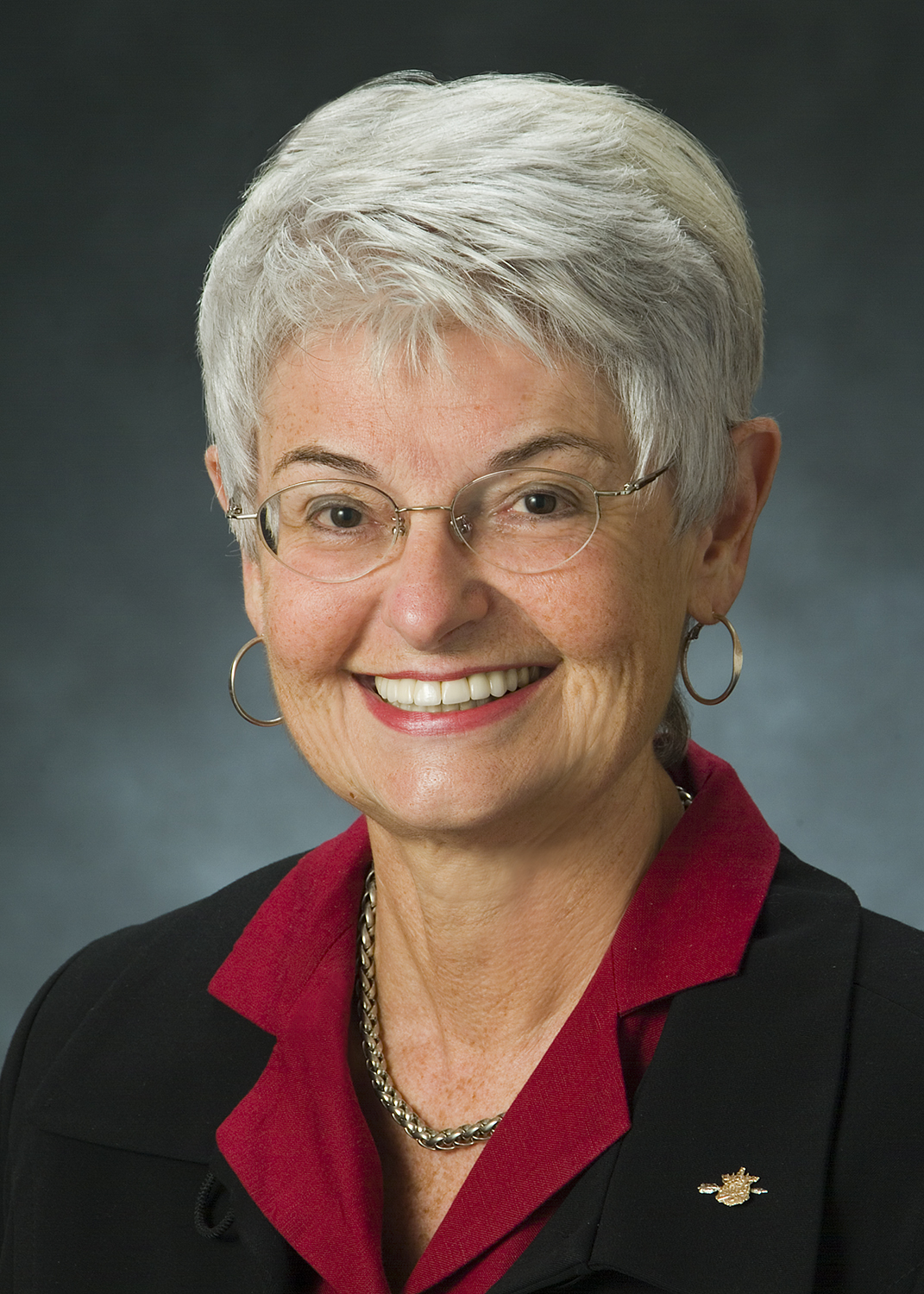

Member of the British Columbia Legislative Assembly for Coquitlam-Maillardville
- In office 2005 – May 14, 2013
- Preceded by: Richard Stewart
- Succeeded by: Selina Robinson

Personal details
- Born: 1943 or 1944 (age 82–83)
- Party: NDP

Diane Thorne (born 1943 or 1944) is a former provincial representative of Coquitlam-Maillardville in the Legislative Assembly of British Columbia, Canada. She was originally elected in 2005 and re-elected in 2009. She was the deputy opposition critic for Education. She is a member of the New Democratic Party of British Columbia. She previously served as a member of Coquitlam City Council, being first elected in 1996.

== Electoral record ==
2009 British Columbia general election: Coquitlam-Maillardville
| Party | Candidate | Votes | % | ±% | Expenditures |
|---|---|---|---|---|---|
| New Democratic | Diane Thorne | 9,818 | 47.92 | +0.96 | $70,174 |
| Liberal | Dennis Marsden | 9,150 | 44.66 | +0.06 | $95,363 |
| Green | Stephen Reid | 1,040 | 5.08 | –1.23 | $350 |
| Independent | Doug Stead | 481 | 2.35 | – | $9,691 |
| Total valid votes | | 20,484 | 100.00 | | |
| Total rejected ballots | | 137 | 0.66 | −0.04 | |
| Turnout | | 20,621 | 55.22 | +6.35 | |
| Registered voters | | 37,342 | | | |
Source: Elections BC
