= Place des Arts (Coquitlam) =

Not-for-profit arts organization

Coordinates: 49.2387°N 122.8612°W

- Formation: 1972; 54 years ago
- Type: Theatre group
- Purpose: Teaching Arts Centre
- Location(s): 1120 Brunette Avenue Coquitlam, British Columbia V3K 1G2
- Website: placedesarts.ca

Place des Arts is a non-profit teaching arts centre and music school located in the Maillardville area of Coquitlam, British Columbia.

Founded in 1972, the centre offers programs in visual arts, music, drama, dance and creative writing. Approximately 80 Place des Arts instructors teach courses to more than 1500 students, while a staff of 20 and over 200 volunteers manage the facility, programs, and exhibitions. Place des Arts also features a wide number of scholarships and bursaries to help support students in music, dance, drama and visual art. Over 90,000 members of the public visit the facility every year.

Place des Arts features specialized programs for school students and home learners, and presents a variety of performances and community cultural experiences. Three exhibition spaces offer emerging local artists an opportunity to exhibit their artwork on a monthly rotating basis. There are 14 music studios, as well as studios for pottery, fibre arts, yoga, dance, drama, music, drawing and painting.

Place des Arts offers several concert performances throughout the year, adult-only pARTy@PdA art events, exhibitions by emerging local artists, free Family Days at PdA as well as numerous recitals and presentations by students on an ongoing basis.
