= Lisa Beare =

Canadian politician

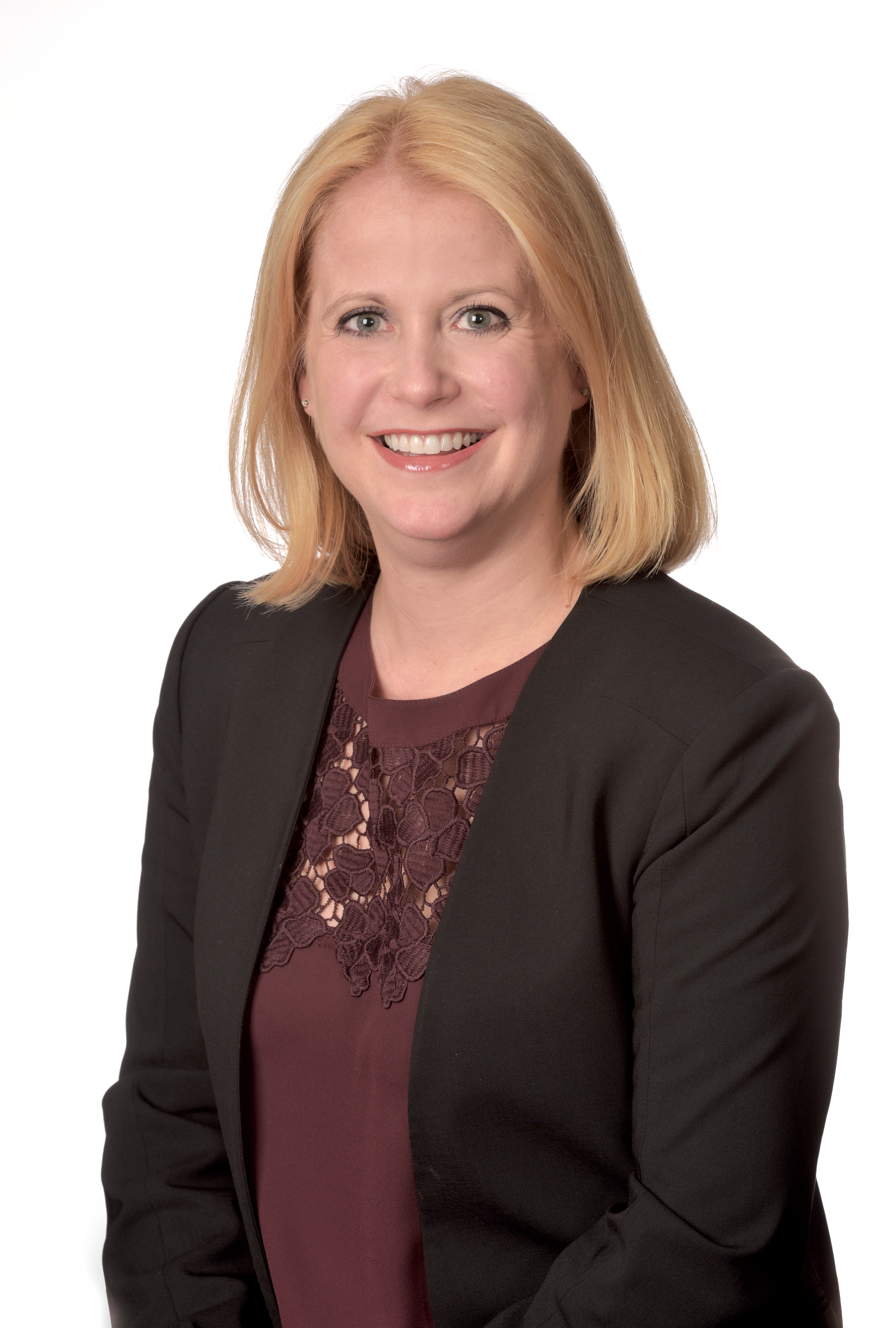
- Campaign portrait, 2016 (Note: Used as the campaign portrait in 2017, 2020, and 2024)

Minister of Education and Child Care of British Columbia
- In office November 18, 2024 – November 20, 2026
- Premier: David Eby
- Preceded by: Rachna Singh
- Succeeded by: Lynne Block

Minister of Post-Secondary Education and Future Skills of British Columbia
- In office February 20, 2024 – November 18, 2024
- Premier: David Eby
- Preceded by: Selina Robinson
- Succeeded by: Anne Kang

Minister of Citizens' Services of British Columbia
- In office November 26, 2020 – February 20, 2024
- Premier: John Horgan; David Eby
- Preceded by: Anne Kang
- Succeeded by: George Chow

Minister of Tourism, Arts, and Culture
- In office September 28, 2022 – December 7, 2022
- Premier: John Horgan; David Eby
- Preceded by: Melanie Mark
- Succeeded by: Lana Popham
- In office July 18, 2017 – November 26, 2020
- Preceded by: Shirley Bond (Tourism); Sam Sullivan (Arts and Culture)
- Succeeded by: Melanie Mark (Tourism, Arts, Culture and Sport)

Member of the British Columbia Legislative Assembly for Maple Ridge-Pitt Meadows
- In office May 9, 2017 – October 24, 2026
- Preceded by: Doug Bing
- Succeeded by: Doug Morneau

Personal details
- Born: Lisa Marie Beare; 1975 or 1976 (age 50–51)
- Party: BC NDP
- Children: 1
- Education: University of Victoria

Lisa Marie Beare (born 1975 or 1976) is a Canadian politician who served as a member of the Legislative Assembly of British Columbia (MLA) representing the electoral district of Maple Ridge-Pitt Meadows from 2017 to 2026. A member of the New Democratic Party, she has served in both cabinets of Premier John Horgan and David Eby, most recently as Minister of Education and Child Care.

== Background ==
Beare grew up in Maple Ridge, British Columbia, and attended Thomas Haney Secondary School. She earned a diploma in local government management from the University of Victoria before starting her career as a flight attendant for Air Transat. During that time she became involved in her union, Canadian Union of Public Employees Local 4078, and eventually served as the local's vice-president.

== Political career ==
In 2014, Beare was elected a Maple Ridge school board trustee with 6,433 votes. Two years later, she announced her decision to seek the BC NDP nomination for the riding of Maple Ridge-Pitt Meadows in the next provincial election. She was elected to the Legislative Assembly of British Columbia in the 2017 election, defeating the incumbent one-term BC Liberal candidate Doug Bing. In the incoming Horgan ministry, she was named Minister of Tourism, Arts and Culture. The following year, she was diagnosed with a medical condition affecting her heart which required surgery.

She was re-elected in the 2020 election, after which she was named the Minister of Citizens' Services. On September 28, 2022, after Tourism Minister Melanie Mark stepped down from cabinet for medical reasons, Beare took over responsibility for the tourism portfolio in addition to her work in citizens' services.

She remained as Minister of Citizens' Services in the Eby ministry announced on December 7, 2022, while the tourism and arts portfolio was re-assigned to Lana Popham. She became Minister of Post-Secondary Education and Future Skills in February 2024, replacing Selina Robinson. After the 2024 election, she was named Minister of Education and Child Care.

In January 2025, Beare fired the entire elected board of School District 61 in Victoria. The decision was made because of the school district ending their police liaison program and the Ministry's concern that the school district did not have an adequate safety plan. This led to a legal challenge between the fired school board members and the Ministry of Education. The Ministry abandoned its case in May 2026, when it was revealed that several text messages were omitted from discovery in March 2026. These text messages showed coordination between the Associate Deputy Minister and Chief of the Victoria Police.

== Electoral history ==
2026 British Columbia general election: Maple Ridge-Pitt Meadows
Party	Candidate	Votes	%	±%	Expenditures
Conservative	Doug Morneau	11,780	48.33	+3.22	
New Democratic	Lisa Beare	10,873	44.61	–10.28	
CentreBC	Jordan Simmons	892	3.66	–	
OneBC	Susan Einarsson	829	3.40	–	
Total valid votes		24,374	99.73	–	
Total rejected ballots		65	0.27	–0.09	
Turnout		24,439	53.01	–6.02	
Registered voters		46,099			
Conservative gain from New Democratic		Swing		+6.75	
Source: Elections BC

2024 British Columbia general election: Maple Ridge-Pitt Meadows
Party	Candidate	Votes	%	±%	Expenditures
New Democratic	Lisa Beare	14,480	54.89	-9.1	$50,684.56
Conservative	Mike Morden	11,901	45.11	–	$38,078.29
Total valid votes/expense limit		26,381	99.64	–	$71,700.08
Total rejected ballots		94	0.36	–	
Turnout		26,475	59.03	–	
Registered voters		44,850			
New Democratic notional hold		Swing		-27.1	
Source: Elections BC

2020 British Columbia general election: Maple Ridge-Pitt Meadows
Party	Candidate	Votes	%	±%	Expenditures
New Democratic	Lisa Beare	15,877	63.41	+18.61	$47,200.48
Liberal	Cheryl Ashlie	9,163	36.59	−2.21	$42,453.66
Total valid votes		25,040	100.00	–	
Total rejected ballots					
Turnout					
Registered voters					
Source: Elections BC

2017 British Columbia general election: Maple Ridge-Pitt Meadows
Party	Candidate	Votes	%	±%	Expenditures
New Democratic	Lisa Beare	12,045	44.80	+1.92	$60,276
Liberal	Doug Bing	10,428	38.79	−6.70	$55,180
Green	Alex Pope	3,329	12.38	+3.23	$6,534
Conservative	Gary John O'Driscoll	676	2.51	+0.03	
Independent	Steve Ranta	408	1.52	–	$979
Total valid votes		26,886	100.00		
Total rejected ballots		173	0.64		
Turnout		27,059	64.50		
Source: Elections BC

== Notes ==
British Columbia provincial government of David Eby
Cabinet posts (3)
Predecessor	Office	Successor
Selina Robinson	Minister of Post-Secondary Education and Future Skills; February 20, 2024 –	Incumbent
cont'd from Horgan Ministry	Minister of Citizens' Services; November 18, 2022 – February 20, 2024	George Chow
cont'd from Horgan Ministry	Minister of Tourism, Arts, Culture and Sport; November 18, 2022 – December 7, 2022	Lana Popham
British Columbia provincial government of John Horgan
Cabinet posts (3)
Predecessor	Office	Successor
Melanie Mark	Minister of Tourism, Arts, Culture and Sport; September 28, 2022 – November 18, 2022	cont'd into Eby Ministry
Anne Kang	Minister of Citizens' Services; November 26, 2020 – November 18, 2022	cont'd into Eby Ministry
Shirley Bond; Sam Sullivan	Minister of Tourism, Arts and Culture; July 18, 2017 – November 26, 2020	Melanie Mark
