= Selina Robinson =

Canadian politician (born 1964)

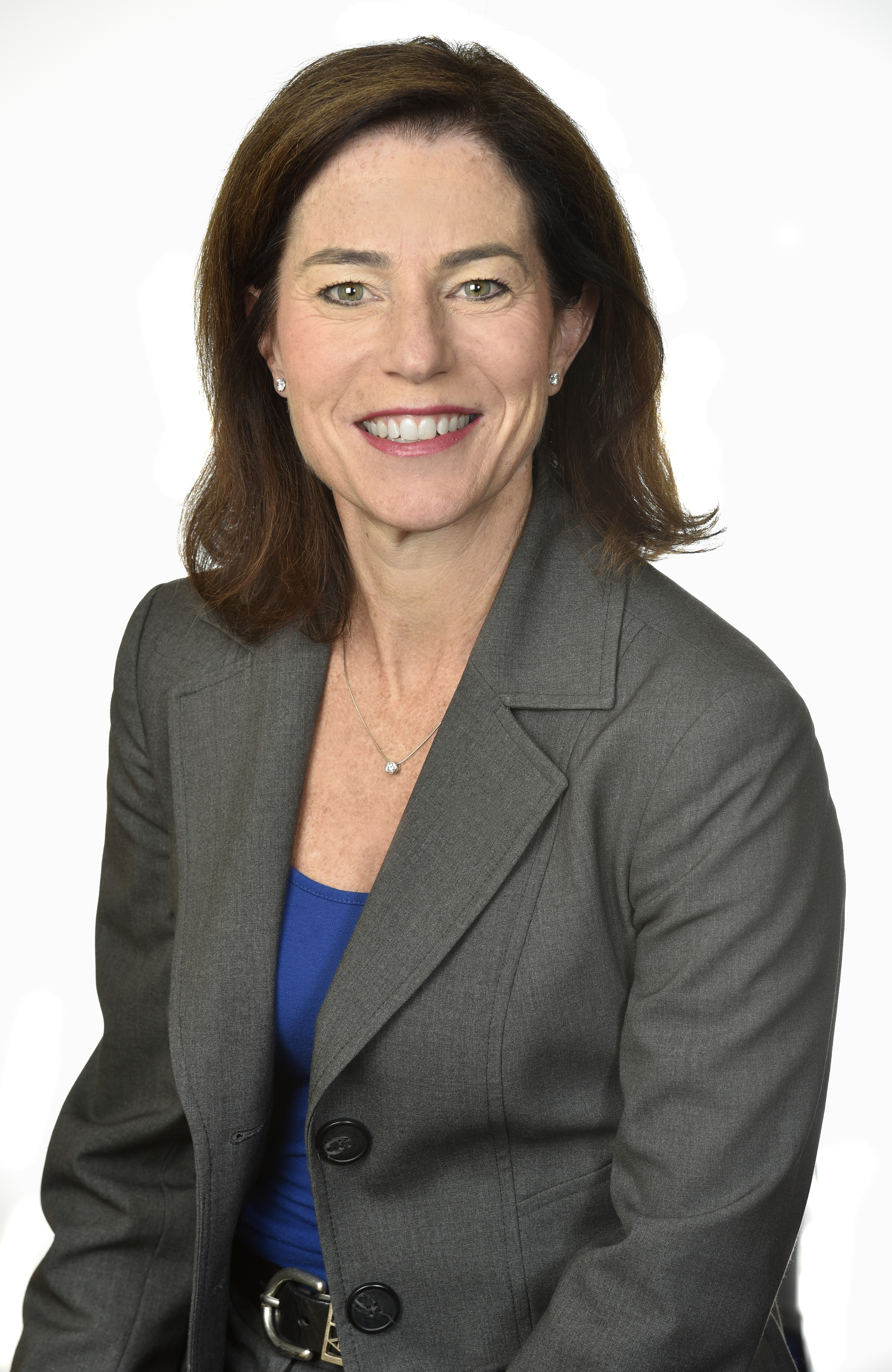
- Robinson in 2016

Minister of Post-Secondary Education and Future Skills of British Columbia
- In office December 7, 2022 – February 5, 2024
- Premier: David Eby
- Preceded by: Anne Kang
- Succeeded by: Lisa Beare

Minister of Finance of British Columbia
- In office November 26, 2020 – December 7, 2022
- Premier: John Horgan; David Eby
- Preceded by: Carole James
- Succeeded by: Katrine Conroy

Minister of Citizens' Services of British Columbia
- In office October 4, 2019 – January 22, 2020
- Premier: John Horgan
- Preceded by: Jinny Sims
- Succeeded by: Anne Kang

Minister of Municipal Affairs and Housing of British Columbia
- In office July 18, 2017 – November 26, 2020
- Premier: John Horgan
- Preceded by: Ellis Ross (Minister of Housing)
- Succeeded by: David Eby (Minister Responsible for Housing); Josie Osborne (Minister of Municipal Affairs)

Member of the British Columbia Legislative Assembly for Coquitlam-Maillardville
- In office May 14, 2013 – September 21, 2024
- Preceded by: Diane Thorne
- Succeeded by: Jennifer Blatherwick

Personal details
- Born: Selina Mae Dardick; 1964 (age 61–62) Montreal, Quebec, Canada
- Party: Independent (2024–present)
- Other political affiliations: New Democratic (before 2024)
- Education: Simon Fraser University

Selina Mae Robinson (née Dardick; born 1964) is a Canadian politician who served as a member of the Legislative Assembly of British Columbia (MLA) representing the electoral district of Coquitlam-Maillardville from 2013 to 2024. She served in cabinets of both premiers John Horgan and David Eby from 2017 to 2024. Elected as a member of the New Democratic Party, she later left caucus in 2024 and sat as an Independent until the end of her term.

== Early life and education ==
Born in Montreal, Robinson moved with her parents to Richmond, British Columbia, in 1978. After graduating from Simon Fraser University with a master's degree in counselling psychology, she joined the Jewish Family Service Agency, eventually becoming its associate executive director. A resident of Coquitlam since 1994, she worked as a family therapist before entering politics as a member of Coquitlam City Council.

== Political career ==
=== In opposition ===
In September 2012, Robinson announced her intention to seek the New Democratic nomination for Coquitlam-Maillardville in the next provincial election; she was acclaimed the NDP's candidate for the riding in November that year. She was initially declared defeated on election night in 2013, with Steve Kim of the BC Liberals deemed winner by 105 votes. However, once absentee ballots were counted, she pulled ahead to win the riding by a 35-vote margin over Kim. A judicial recount confirmed Robinson's victory by a final margin of 41 votes. She served as critic for mental health and addictions, seniors, local government and sports in the NDP shadow cabinet.

In the 2017 general election, Robinson once again faced Steve Kim, this time winning by more than 2400 votes.

=== In cabinet ===
Following her election win, Robinson was appointed Minister of Municipal Affairs and Housing in the new NDP government under Premier John Horgan. Following the resignation of Jinny Sims from cabinet in October 2019, Robinson briefly assumed the role of Minister of Citizens' Services, until Anne Kang took over the position in January 2020.

Following her re-election in the 2020 general election, she was appointed Minister of Finance. After Horgan announced his retirement as premier and party leader in 2022, Robinson considered running to replace him before deciding otherwise. On December 7, 2022, she was appointed Minister of Post-Secondary Education and Future Skills by Premier David Eby.

Robinson worked with B'nai Brith to mandate Holocaust education in the school curriculum which would be organized by the pro-Israel organization Centre for Israel and Jewish Affairs.

Robinson stepped down from cabinet in January 2024 following controversial comments on Palestine.

=== Post-cabinet ===
After Robinson stepped down from cabinet, she announced that she would not seek re-election in the 2024 general election stating that she felt unsupported as a Jewish woman in her party and that she faced double standards by her party.

On March 6, 2024, she announced she would sit as an independent. In that years general election her seat was held by the New Democratic candidate Jennifer Blatherwick.

On January 1, 2025, she told the National Post that the NDP had been antisemitic "for years" and that progressive parties like the NDP are pandering to "conservative Muslim groups that are anti-Israel".

== Controversies ==
=== Comments on Palestine ===
In January 2024, Robinson faced criticism after describing the land on which Israel was established as "a crappy piece of land" during an online event hosted by B'nai Brith Canada. Her remarks drew criticism from academics and politicians, who characterized them as historically inaccurate and insensitive toward Palestinians. Robinson subsequently apologized, explaining that she had been referring to the region's limited natural resources. Premier David Eby condemned the remarks as "wrong and unacceptable". On February 5, 2024, Robinson resigned from cabinet following mounting criticism and calls for her removal.

=== Firing of Natalie Knight ===
Robinson also faced criticism over her involvement in the dismissal of Natalie Knight, an instructor at Langara College who had made controversial remarks concerning the October 7, 2023 attacks on Israel. Knight was initially placed on leave before being reinstated following an internal investigation. Robinson subsequently expressed concerns about the reinstatement to college administrators, and Knight was dismissed in January 2024. The Federation of Post-Secondary Educators of BC and the Canadian Association of University Teachers accused Robinson of political interference and called for her resignation, citing concerns about academic freedom.

== Electoral history ==
2020 British Columbia general election: Coquitlam-Maillardville
Party	Candidate	Votes	%	±%	Expenditures
New Democratic	Selina Robinson	12,278	59.70	+9.09	$42,824.64
Liberal	Will Davis	5,882	28.60	−9.10	$17,661.62
Green	Nicola Spurling	2,405	11.69	+0.77	$3,326.81
Total valid votes		20,565	100.00	–	
Total rejected ballots		187	0.91	+0.47	
Turnout		20,752	52.48	−9.09	
Registered voters		39,542			
Source: Elections BC

2017 British Columbia general election: Coquitlam-Maillardville
Party	Candidate	Votes	%	±%	Expenditures
New Democratic	Selina Robinson	11,438	50.61	+4.87	$68,146
Liberal	Steve Kim	8,519	37.70	−7.85	$76,040
Green	Nicola Eyton Spurling	2,467	10.92	+2.21	$843
Libertarian	Jesse Velay-Vitow	175	0.77	–	$250
Total valid votes		22,599	100.00	–	
Total rejected ballots		99	0.44	−0.41	
Turnout		22,698	61.57	+4.88	
Registered voters		36,865			
Source: Elections BC

2013 British Columbia general election: Coquitlam-Maillardville
Party	Candidate	Votes	%	±%	Expenditures
New Democratic	Selina Robinson	9,930	45.74	−2.18	$107,325
Liberal	Steve Kim	9,889	45.55	+0.89	$80,581.18
Green	Edward Andreas Stanbrough	1,891	8.71	+36.3	$750
Total valid votes		21,710	100.00		
Total rejected ballots		186	0.85	+0.19	
Turnout		21,896	56.69	+1.47	
Source: Elections BC

== See also ==
- A land without a people for a people without a land

British Columbia provincial government of David Eby
Cabinet post (1)
Predecessor	Office	Successor
Anne Kang	Minister of Post-Secondary Education and Future Skills; December 7, 2022 – February 5, 2024	Lisa Beare
British Columbia provincial government of John Horgan
Cabinet posts (3)
Predecessor	Office	Successor
Carole James	Minister of Finance; November 26, 2020 – December 7, 2022	Katrine Conroy
Jinny Sims	Minister of Citizens' Services; October 4, 2019 – January 22, 2020	Anne Kang
Ellis Ross	Minister of Municipal Affairs and Housing; July 18, 2017 – November 26, 2020	David Eby; Josie Osborne
