= Ken Stewart (politician) =

Canadian politician

Ken Stewart is a politician from British Columbia, Canada. Stewart won the riding of Maple Ridge-Pitt Meadows in the 2001 British Columbia general election.

Stewart ran unsuccessfully as the BC Liberal candidate for MLA in the constituency of Maple Ridge-Pitt Meadows in 1996, but again contested and won the seat during the BC Liberal sweep of 2001. In 2005, he was defeated by the NDP's Michael Sather and in 2009, he faced Sather again in an unsuccessful bid to retake the district.

Stewart served as a member of Maple Ridge municipal council from 1996 to 1999 and again from 2005 to 2008.
