= Matt Liang =

Canadian politician

Matt Liang MLA

Member of the Legislative Assembly for Coquitlam-Maillardville
- Incumbent
- Assumed office October 24, 2026
- Preceded by: Jennifer Blatherwick

Personal details
- Party: Conservative
- Website: website

Matt Liang MLA is a Canadian politician who is the Member of the British Columbia Legislative Assembly for Coquitlam-Maillardville since the 2026 British Columbia general election. Liang previously served as a deputy sheriff, a child care counsellor, and a health and safety facilitator for the British Columbia General Employees' Union.

== Electoral record ==
2026 British Columbia general election: Coquitlam-Maillardville
Party	Candidate	Votes	%	±%	Expenditures
Conservative	Matt Liang	9,626	49.49	+9.92	
New Democratic	Jennifer Blatherwick	8,057	41.42	-10.38	
Green	Nicola Spurling	1,732	8.90	+2.58	
Total valid votes		19,415	99.81		
Total rejected ballots		36	0.19		
Turnout					
Registered voters					
Conservative gain from New Democratic		Swing		+10.15	
Source: Elections BC
