= Scott Young (politician) =

Canadian former mayor

His Worship Scott Young

Mayor of Port Coquitlam
- In office 2001 – December 1, 2008
- Preceded by: Len Traboulay
- Succeeded by: Greg Moore

Personal details
- Born: 1961 (age 64–65)
- Profession: Politician

Scott Young (born 1961) is a former mayor of Port Coquitlam, British Columbia, Canada, who served from 2001 to December 1, 2008. Raised in Burnaby, Young was first elected mayor of Port Coquitlam in 2001, after serving as City Councillor from 1996 to 2000 and a school board trustee prior to that. He was re-elected in 2005.

== Criminal activities ==
In 2002, Young was arrested for allegedly assaulting his wife and was sentenced to a one-year peace bond.

In February, 2007, Young was arrested by local Royal Canadian Mounted Police for allegedly harassing his ex-girlfriend, Colleen Preston. On April 4, 2007, Young was arrested and imprisoned after being accused of breaking into Preston's gym and attacking her boyfriend and then her. Following his arrest, Young officially remained mayor of the city, as he was not required to step aside under the Province of British Columbia's Community Charter, legislation governing municipalities. On April 13, Young stepped aside temporarily to seek counseling for alcoholism.

On May 21, 2008, Young pleaded guilty to 3 charges: 1 count of breaching an undertaking or recognizance and 2 counts of assault. On July 25, 2008, the Provincial Court of British Columbia handed down a twelve-month conditional sentence and also a curfew of 8 p.m. to 6 a.m. except for two Mondays a month for Council meetings, when he must return to his residence by 10:30 p.m. This sentence would be followed by 18 months of probation. The court stayed charges of breaking and entering, criminal harassment, and two additional charges of breach of recognizance.

During the sentence and the probationary period, Mayor Young could not contact or approach Ms. Preston or Mr. Shaw, consume alcoholic beverages or other drugs, or own or use a weapon. He was required to receive counselling, and he was also ordered to perform 60 hours of community service and provide a DNA sample.

Young chose to run for a councillor's seat in the November 2008 Port Coquitlam municipal elections but was defeated. He was succeeded in the mayor's office by Greg Moore.
