= Maillardville-Coquitlam =

Defunct provincial electoral district in British Columbia, Canada

Maillardville-Coquitlam was a provincial electoral district for the Legislative Assembly of British Columbia, Canada.

== See also ==
- List of British Columbia provincial electoral districts
- Canadian provincial electoral districts
