= Colin Kinsley =

Canadian politician

His Worship Colin Kinsley
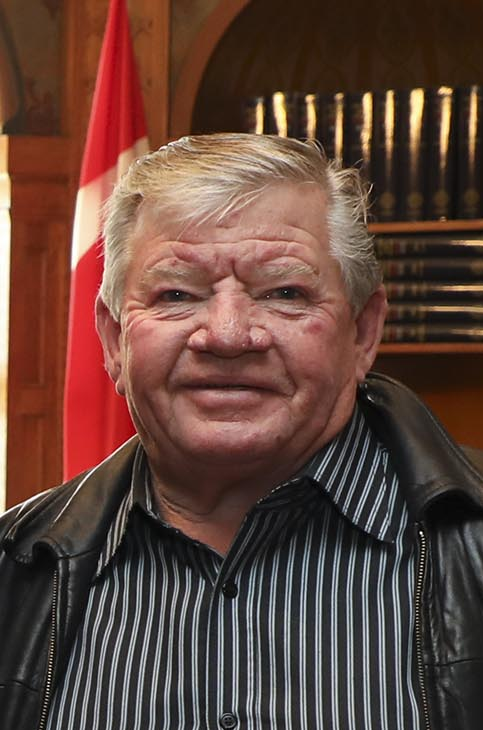
- Kinsley in 2017

Mayor of Prince George, British Columbia
- In office 1996–2008
- Preceded by: John Backhouse
- Succeeded by: Dan Rogers

Colin Kinsley was the mayor of Prince George, British Columbia, Canada from December 1996 through November 2008, when he chose to retire. He has been a resident of Prince George since 1971.

== Early years ==
Before he began in public office, Kinsley worked for 30 years in the natural gas industry.

== Early political career ==
Kinsley served as an alderman from 1984 to 1993. During that time, he also served four years as chairman of the regional district board. Aside from his mayoral duties, Kinsley was also a director on the board of the Regional District of Fraser-Fort George and a director on the boards of several Prince George community groups including the Northern Medical School Program Action Group.

Kinsley served as the president of the North Central Municipal Association in 1989–1990.
