= James Atebe =

Canadian politician

Mayor of Mission, British Columbia
- In office December 1, 2005 – December 1, 2011
- Preceded by: Abe Neufeld
- Succeeded by: Ted Adlem

Member of the Mission Council
- In office December 1, 1999 – December 1, 2005

James Atebe is a past mayor of Mission, British Columbia, Canada, a municipality east of Vancouver in the British Columbia region known as the Fraser Valley. Atebe is a native of Ekerenyo, a village in the North Mugirango Constituency of Kenya, and grew up with four brothers and four sisters. He immigrated to Canada from Kenya as a teenager. He received a master's degree in city planning from the University of Washington, Seattle.

Atebe began his political career in 1999 when he first ran for office. He was first elected mayor in 2005, after serving as a member of the city council for six years. Atebe was re-elected in 2008 over Matt Johnson, his opponent, who received less than 20 percent of the vote after almost being acclaimed as mayor of Mission. However, in the 2011 municipal election, Atebe was defeated by opponent Ted Adlem, who captured 50 percent of the vote.

Atebe was a roommate of Canadian prime minister Stephen Harper in Calgary. In 2009, Canadian Immigrant named Atebe as "one of Canada's Top 25 immigrants" at the Citizenship and Immigration office in Vancouver as part of the Top 25 Canadian Immigrant Awards.
