= Maxine Wilson =

American-born Canadian politician

Her Worship Maxine Wilson

Mayor of Coquitlam
- In office 2005–2008
- Preceded by: Jon Kingsbury
- Succeeded by: Richard Stewart

Councillor for Coquitlam
- In office 1998–2005

Personal details
- Born: Maxine Bottemiller; 1946 (age 79–80) Portland, Oregon
- Party: Non Partisan
- Spouse: James G. Wilson
- Children: 2

Maxine Wilson is the former mayor of Coquitlam, British Columbia.

Born in 1946 in Portland, Oregon, Wilson grew up on a family farm. In 1959, Wilson moved to Canada with her parents and sister. The family settled in Dawson Creek, British Columbia, where her father bought a farm.

From 1969 to 1975, she worked as an elementary school teacher. She joined the first formal Parent Advisory Council (PAC) in Coquitlam, and in 1988 took part in the last Sullivan Royal Commission on Education. In the same year, Wilson founded the BC Confederation of Parent Advisory Councils and became a school trustee. Her position on the School District 43 school board lasted ten years, four in which she chaired.

In 1998, she was elected to the Coquitlam City Council, and in 2005 won a close race for mayoralty against incumbent mayor Jon Kingsbury. She lost the 2008 race to Richard Stewart.
