= List of British Columbia by-elections =

The list of British Columbia by-elections includes every by-election held in the Canadian province of British Columbia. By-elections occur whenever there is a vacancy in the Legislative Assembly, although an imminent general election may allow the vacancy to remain until the dissolution of parliament.

== Causes ==
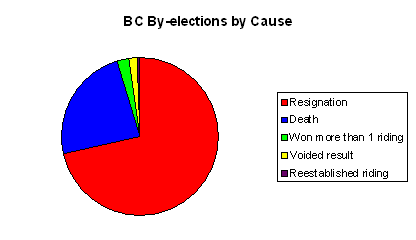
By-elections by cause, 1871–2008

A by-election occurs whenever there is a vacancy in the Legislative Assembly. Vacancies can occur for the following reasons:

- Death of a member – as of August 2026, the last sitting MLA to die in office was Joan Phillip in 2026. In addition, elected MLAs sometimes die before taking their seats. The last time this happened was in 1924 when John McKie died before the first session.
- Resignation of a member
- Recall of a member – this has never happened. However, former MLA Paul Reitsma was unofficially recalled because he resigned just as a recall attempt nearly succeeded.
- Voided results – the last time a by-election took place for this reason was in 1904. As of August 2026, the last election that came close to being voided was in 1963.
- Expulsion from the legislature
- Ineligibility to sit
- Winning in more than one district during a general election – the last time that happened was in 1921. It has been forbidden to run in multiple districts since 1940.
- A riding being established during a parliament – the only time a by-election took place because of this was in early 1934, in Columbia.
- Ministerial by-election – until the 1930s, an MLA's seat was declared vacant and the occupant was required to re-offer upon being appointed to Cabinet. Such by-elections often resulted in the incumbent being acclaimed.

When there is a vacancy, a by-election must be called within six months of the chief electoral officer learning of it. The only exception is when a member has been recalled. In that case, a by-election must be held with 90 days.

== 43rd Parliament 2025–2026 ==
By-election	Date	Incumbent	Party	Winner	Party	Cause	Retained
Abbotsford-Mission	Cancelled	Reann Gasper	Conservative	None; the legislature was dissolved before the by-election was held (scheduled for September 26, 2026)		Resigned to allow newly elected BC Conservative Party leader Kerry-Lynne Findlay to run in a by-election	N/A

== 42nd Parliament 2020–2024 ==
By-election	Date	Incumbent	Party	Winner	Party	Cause	Retained
Langford-Juan de Fuca	June 24, 2023	John Horgan	NDP	Ravi Parmar	NDP	Resigned for medical reasons	Yes
Vancouver-Mount Pleasant	June 24, 2023	Melanie Mark	NDP	Joan Phillip	NDP	Resigned for personal reasons	Yes
Surrey South	September 10, 2022	Stephanie Cadieux	Liberal	Elenore Sturko	Liberal	Resigned to become Canada's first chief accessibility officer	Yes
Vancouver-Quilchena	April 30, 2022	Andrew Wilkinson	Liberal	Kevin Falcon	Liberal	Resigned to allow newly elected BC Liberal Party leader Kevin Falcon to run in a by-election	Yes

== 41st Parliament 2017–2020 ==
By-election	Date	Incumbent	Party	Winner	Party	Cause	Retained
Nanaimo	January 30, 2019	Leonard Krog	New Democratic	Sheila Malcolmson	New Democratic	Resigned after being elected mayor of Nanaimo	Yes
Kelowna West	February 14, 2018	Christy Clark	Liberal	Ben Stewart	Liberal	Resigned to return to private life following the defeat of her government	Yes

== 40th Parliament 2013–2017 ==
By-election	Date	Incumbent	Party	Winner	Party	Cause	Retained
Coquitlam-Burke Mountain	February 2, 2016	Douglas Horne	Liberal	Jodie Wickens	New Democratic	Resigned to run federally	No
Vancouver-Mount Pleasant	February 2, 2016	Jenny Kwan	New Democratic	Melanie Mark	New Democratic	Resigned to run federally	Yes
Westside-Kelowna	July 10, 2013	Ben Stewart	Liberal	Christy Clark	Liberal	Resigned to create vacancy for Premier Christy Clark	Yes

== 39th Parliament 2009–2013 ==
By-election	Date	Incumbent	Party	Winner	Party	Cause	Retained
Port Moody-Coquitlam	April 19, 2012	Iain Black	Liberal	Joe Trasolini	New Democratic	Resigned to become president and CEO of the Vancouver Board of Trade	No
Chilliwack-Hope	April 19, 2012	Barry Penner	Liberal	Gwen O'Mahony	New Democratic	Resigned to return to the private sector	No
Vancouver-Point Grey	May 11, 2011	Gordon Campbell	Liberal	Christy Clark	Liberal	Resigned to create vacancy for new premier Christy Clark	Yes

== 38th Parliament 2005–2009 ==
By-election	Date	Incumbent	Party	Winner	Party	Cause	Retained
Vancouver-Burrard	October 29, 2008	Lorne Mayencourt	Liberal	Spencer Herbert	New Democratic	Resigned to run federally in Vancouver Centre	No
Vancouver-Fairview	October 29, 2008	Gregor Robertson	New Democratic	Jenn McGinn	New Democratic	Resigned to become Mayor of Vancouver	Yes

== 37th Parliament 2001–2005 ==
By-election	Date	Incumbent	Party	Winner	Party	Cause	Retained
Surrey-Panorama Ridge	October 28, 2004	Gulzar Cheema	Liberals	Jagrup Brar	New Democratic	Resigned to run federally in Fleetwood—Port Kells	No

== 36th Parliament 1996–2001 ==
By-election	Date	Incumbent	Party	Winner	Party	Cause	Retained
Delta South	December 7, 1999	Fred Gingell	Liberals	Val Roddick	Liberals	Death	Yes
Parksville-Qualicum	December 14, 1998	Paul Reitsma	Independent*	Judith Reid	Liberals	Resignation	No
Surrey-White Rock	September 15, 1997	Wilf Hurd	Liberals	Gordon Hogg	Liberals	Resignation	Yes

* Reitsma is a former Liberal.

== 35th Parliament 1991–1996 ==
By-election	Date	Incumbent	Party	Winner	Party	Cause	Retained
Abbotsford	May 3, 1995	Harry de Jong	Social Credit	John van Dongen	Liberals	Resignation	No
Vancouver-Quilchena	February 17, 1994	Art Cowie	Liberals	Gordon Campbell	Liberals	Resignation	Yes
Matsqui	February 17, 1994	Peter Albert Dueck	Independent*	Mike de Jong	Liberals	Resignation	No

* Dueck is a former Socred.

== 34th Parliament 1986–1991 ==
By-election	Date	Incumbent	Party	Winner	Party	Cause	Retained
Oak Bay-Gordon Head	December 13, 1989	Brian Smith	Social Credit	Elizabeth Cull	New Democratic	Resignation	No
Cariboo	September 20, 1989	Alex Fraser	Social Credit	David Zirnhelt	New Democratic	Death	No
Nanaimo	March 15, 1989	Dave Stupich	New Democratic	Jan Pullinger	New Democratic	Resignation	Yes
Vancouver-Point Grey	March 15, 1989	Kim Campbell	Social Credit	Tom Perry	New Democratic	Resignation	No
Alberni	November 19, 1988	Robert Skelly	New Democratic	Gerard Janssen	New Democratic	Resignation	Yes
Boundary-Similkameen	June 8, 1988	James Hewitt	Social Credit	Bill Barlee	New Democratic	Resignation	No

== 33rd Parliament 1983–1986 ==
By-election	Date	Incumbent	Party	Winner	Party	Cause	Retained
Okanagan North	November 8, 1984	Donald Campbell	Social Credit	Lyle MacWilliam	New Democratic	Death	No
Vancouver East	November 8, 1984	Dave Barrett	New Democratic	Robert Williams	New Democratic	Resignation	Yes

== 32nd Parliament 1979–1983 ==
Until 2011, the last by-election won by a governing party was the Kamloops by-election. During the 30 years between this parliament and 2011, the governing parties lost seventeen consecutive by-elections.

By-election	Date	Incumbent	Party	Winner	Party	Cause	Retained
Kamloops	May 14, 1981	Rafe Mair	Social Credit	Claude Richmond	Social Credit	Resignation	Yes

== 31st Parliament 1975–1979 ==
By-election	Date	Incumbent	Party	Winner	Party	Cause	Retained
Oak Bay	March 20, 1978	Scott Wallace	Progressive Conservative	Victor Stephens	Progressive Conservative	Resignation	Yes
Vancouver East	June 3, 1976	Robert Williams	New Democratic	Dave Barrett	New Democratic	Resignation	Yes

== 30th Parliament 1972–1975 ==
By-election	Date	Incumbent	Party	Winner	Party	Cause	Retained
North Vancouver-Capilano	February 5, 1974	David Brousson	Liberal	Gordon Gibson Jr.	Liberal	Resignation	Yes
South Okanagan	September 7, 1973	W.A.C. Bennett	Social Credit	Bill Bennett	Social Credit	Resignation	Yes

== 29th Parliament 1969–1972 ==
There were no by-elections.

== 28th Parliament 1966–1969 ==
By-election	Date	Incumbent	Party	Winner	Party	Cause	Retained
Burnaby-Willingdon	January 13, 1969	Fred Vulliamy	New Democratic	James Lorimer	New Democratic	Death	Yes
Revelstoke-Slocan	July 15, 1968	Randolph Harding	New Democratic	William King	New Democratic	Resignation	Yes
Oak Bay	July 15, 1968	Alan MacFarlane	Liberal	Allan Cox	Liberal	Resignation	Yes
North Vancouver-Capilano	July 15, 1968	Raymond Perrault	Liberal	David Brousson	Liberal	Resignation	Yes
Vancouver South	May 21, 1968	Thomas Bate	Social Credit	Norman Levi	New Democratic	Death	No
Cariboo	November 28, 1966	William Speare	Social Credit	Robert Bonner	Social Credit	Resignation	Yes

== 27th Parliament 1963–1966 ==
There were no by-elections.

== 26th Parliament 1960–1963 ==
By-election	Date	Incumbent	Party	Winner	Party	Cause	Retained
Columbia	July 15, 1963	Richard Newton	Social Credit	Frank Greenwood	Social Credit	Death	Yes
Vancouver-Point Grey	December 17, 1962	Buda Brown	Social Credit	Patrick McGeer	Liberal	Death	No
Revelstoke	September 4, 1962	George Hobbs	CCF	Margaret Hobbs	CCF-NDP	Death	Yes

== 25th Parliament 1956–1960 ==
By-election	Date	Incumbent	Party	Winner	Party	Cause	Retained
Rossland-Trail	December 15, 1958	Robert Sommers	Social Credit	Donald Brothers	Social Credit	Resignation	Yes
Delta	September 9, 1957	Thomas Irwin	Social Credit	Gordon L. Gibson	Social Credit	Resignation	Yes
Cariboo	September 9, 1957	Ralph Chetwynd	Social Credit	William Speare	Social Credit	Death	Yes
Burnaby	September 9, 1957	Ernest Winch	CCF	Cedric Cox	CCF	Death	Yes

== 24th Parliament 1953–1956 ==
Douglas Jung of the Progressive Conservative Party runs in the Vancouver Centre by-election, the first time any Chinese Canadian had run for a seat in a Canadian legislature.

By-election	Date	Incumbent	Party	Winner	Party	Cause	Retained
Vancouver Centre	January 9, 1956	George Moxham	Social Credit	Leslie Peterson	Social Credit	Death	Yes
Lillooet	September 12, 1955	Gordon Gibson Sr.	Liberal	Donald Robinson	Social Credit	Resignation	No
Victoria City	November 24, 1953	Walter Wright	Social Credit	George Gregory	Liberal	Resignation	No

== 23rd Parliament 1952–1953 ==
These by-elections are held under the alternative vote system, the only two times (as of March 2008) by-elections had been held using that voting system. After the next general election, the voting system would revert to first past the post in time for the next by-election.

By-election	Date	Incumbent	Party	Winner	Party	Cause	Retained
Similkameen	November 24, 1952	Henry Francis	Social Credit	Einar Gunderson	Social Credit	Resignation	Yes
Columbia	November 24, 1952	Richard Newton	Social Credit	Robert Bonner	Social Credit	Resignation	Yes

== 22nd Parliament 1949–1952 ==
By-election	Date	Incumbent	Party	Winner	Party	Cause	Retained
Esquimalt	October 1, 1951	Charles Beard	Coalition	Franklin Mitchell	CCF	Death	No

== 21st Parliament 1945–1949 ==
By-election	Date	Incumbent	Party	Winner	Party	Cause	Retained
South Okanagan	November 29, 1948	W.A.C. Bennett	Coalition	Robert Browne-Clayton	Coalition	Resignation	Yes
Rossland-Trail	November 29, 1948	James Webster	Coalition	James Quinn	CCF	Death	No
Saanich	February 23, 1948	Norman Whittaker	Coalition	Arthur Ash	Coalition	Resignation	Yes
Cariboo	February 23, 1948	Louis LeBourdais	Coalition	Walter Hogg	Coalition	Death	Yes
Vancouver-Point Grey	June 24, 1946	James Paton	Coalition	Albert MacDougall	Coalition	Death	Yes
Vancouver-Point Grey	June 24, 1946	Royal Maitland	Coalition	Leigh Stevenson	Coalition	Death	Yes
North Okanagan	December 19, 1945	Kenneth MacDonald	Coalition	Charles Morrow	Coalition	Death	Yes

== 20th Parliament 1941–1945 ==
By-election	Date	Incumbent	Party	Winner	Party	Cause	Retained
New Westminster	May 10, 1945	Arthur Gray	Coalition	Byron Ingemar Johnson	Coalition	Death	Yes
Revelstoke	June 14, 1943	Harry Johnston	Coalition	Vincent Segur	CCF	Death	No
Salmon Arm	November 25, 1942	Rolf Bruhn	Coalition	George Stirling	CCF	Death	No

== 19th Parliament 1937–1941 ==
By-election	Date	Incumbent	Party	Winner	Party	Cause	Retained
Mackenzie	September 21, 1940	John Bryan, Sr.	Liberal	Manfred McGeer	Liberal	Death	Yes
Cranbrook	October 26, 1939	Frank MacPherson	Liberal	Arnold McGrath	Liberal	Resignation	Yes
Vancouver Centre	May 1, 1939	Fred Crone	Liberal	Laura Jamieson	CCF	Death	No
Dewdney	May 20, 1938	Frank Patterson	Conservative	David Strachan	Liberal	Death	No

== 18th Parliament 1933–1937 ==
The Columbia by-election is notable for two reasons. First, it is the only one (as of March 2008) held due to a district being created during a parliament; Second, it is the last time (as of March 2008) a candidate won through acclamation.

By-election	Date	Incumbent	Party		Winner	Party	Cause	Retained
Vancouver-Burrard	September 2, 1936	Gerry McGeer		Liberal	John Forester	Liberal	Resignation	Yes
Omineca	June 22, 1936	Alexander Malcolm Manson		Liberal	Mark Connelly	Liberal	Resignation	Yes
North Vancouver	July 14, 1934	Harley Anderson		CCF	Dorothy Steeves	CCF	Death	Yes
Columbia	March 20, 1934†	n/a	n/a	n/a	Thomas King	Liberal	District created	n/a

† Won by acclamation; this date is the date of the return of the writ.

== 17th Parliament 1928–1933 ==
By-election	Date	Incumbent	Party	Winner	Party	Cause	Retained
Columbia	December 19, 1931	John Buckham	Liberal	Thomas King	Liberal	Death	Yes
The Islands	February 21, 1931†	Cyrus Wesley Peck	Conservative	MacGregor Macintosh	Conservative	Resignation	Yes
Fort George	January 7, 1931	Frederick Burden	Conservative	Roy Alward	Conservative	Resignation	Yes
North Vancouver	November 5, 1930	Ian Alistair MacKenzie	Liberal	Jack Loutet	Conservative	Resignation	No
North Okanagan	July 2, 1930†	William Farris Kennedy	Conservative	George Heggie	Conservative	Resignation	Yes
Chilliwack	October 22, 1928†	William Atkinson	Conservative	William Atkinson	Conservative	Joined Executive Council	Yes
Dewdney	October 22, 1928†	Nelson Lougheed	Conservative	Nelson Lougheed	Conservative	Joined Executive Council	Yes
Esquimalt	October 22, 1928†	Robert Pooley	Conservative	Robert Pooley	Conservative	Joined Executive Council	Yes
Fort George	October 22, 1928†	Frederick Burden	Conservative	Frederick Burden	Conservative	Joined Executive Council	Yes
Richmond-Point Grey	October 22, 1928†	Samuel Howe	Conservative	Samuel Howe	Conservative	Joined Executive Council	Yes
Saanich	October 22, 1928†	Simon Fraser Tolmie	Conservative	Simon Fraser Tolmie	Conservative	Joined Executive Council	Yes
Similkameen	October 22, 1928†	William McKenzie	Conservative	William McKenzie	Conservative	Joined Executive Council	Yes
Vancouver City	October 22, 1928†	William Shelly	Conservative	William Shelly	Conservative	Joined Executive Council	Yes
Victoria City	October 22, 1928†	Joshua Hinchcliffe	Conservative	Joshua Hinchcliffe	Conservative	Joined Executive Council	Yes

† Won by acclamation; this date is the date of the return of the writ.

== 16th Parliament 1924–1928 ==
By-election	Date	Incumbent	Party	Winner	Party	Cause	Retained
Nelson	October 17, 1927	John Oliver	Liberal	James McDonald	Liberal	Death	Yes
New Westminster	September 12, 1927	Edwin Rothwell	Liberal	Arthur Gray	Liberal	Death	Yes
North Okanagan	June 9, 1927	Arthur Cochrane	Conservative	William Farris Kennedy	Conservative	Death	Yes
Grand Forks-Greenwood	April 25, 1925	John McKie	Conservative	Dougald McPherson	Liberal	Death	No
North Okanagan	September 24, 1924	Kenneth MacDonald	Liberal	Arthur Cochrane	Conservative	Joined Executive Council	No
Nelson	August 23, 1924	Kenneth Campbell	Liberal	John Oliver	Liberal	Resignation	Yes

== 15th Parliament 1920–1924 ==
By-election	Date	Incumbent	Party	Winner	Party	Cause	Retained
Cranbrook	August 15, 1922	James Horace King	Liberal	Noel Wallinger	Conservative	Resignation	No
Omineca	April 10, 1922†	Alexander Malcolm Manson	Liberal	Alexander Malcolm Manson	Liberal	Joined Executive Council	Yes
Nelson	March 22, 1922	William Rose	Conservative	Kenneth Campbell	Liberal	Resignation	No
Revelstoke	February 27, 1922	William Sutherland	Liberal	William Sutherland	Liberal	Joined Executive Council	Yes
Delta	February 3, 1921	John Oliver	Liberal	Alexander Paterson	Liberal	Won more than one district	Yes

† Won by acclamation; this date is the date of the return of the writ.

== 14th Parliament 1916–1920 ==
The Vancouver City by-election was won by Mary Ellen Smith. She is the first woman to run and be elected in a provincial-level election, which was also the first one where women could vote.

By-election	Date	Incumbent	Party	Winner	Party	Cause	Retained
Alberni	January 29, 1919†	Richard Wallis	Conservative	Richard Burde	Independent Soldier	Death	No
Cowichan	January 25, 1919	William Hayward	Conservative	Kenneth Duncan	Unionist	Resignation	No
Victoria City	June 28, 1918	Harlan Carey Brewster	Liberal	Francis Giolma	Soldier	Death	No
Chilliwack	May 10, 1918	Edward Dodsley Barrow	Liberal	Edward Dodsley Barrow	Liberal	Joined Executive Council	Yes
Vancouver City	January 24, 1918	Ralph Smith	Liberal	Mary Ellen Smith	Independent~	Death	Yes
Alberni	January 24, 1918	Harlan Carey Brewster	Liberal	Richard Wallis	Conservative	Won more than one district	No
Newcastle	January 24, 1918	Parker Williams	Independent Socialist	James Hawthornthwaite	Independent Socialist/Labour*	Resignation	Yes
Similkameen	January 24, 1918	Lytton Shatford	Conservative	William McKenzie	Conservative	Resignation	Yes
Vancouver City	June 23, 1917†	John Farris	Liberal	John Farris	Liberal	Joined Executive Council	Yes
Victoria City	June 22, 1917	John Hart	Liberal	John Hart	Liberal	Joined Executive Council	Yes
Cranbrook	January 3, 1917†	James King	Liberal	James King	Liberal	Joined Executive Council	Yes
Dewdney	January 3, 1917†	John Oliver	Liberal	John Oliver	Liberal	Joined Executive Council	Yes
Greenwood	January 3, 1917†	John MacLean	Liberal	John MacLean	Liberal	Joined Executive Council	Yes
Nanaimo	January 3, 1917†	William Sloan	Liberal	William Sloan	Liberal	Joined Executive Council	Yes
Victoria City	January 3, 1917†	Harlan Carey Brewster	Liberal	Harlan Carey Brewster	Liberal	Joined Executive Council	Yes
Prince Rupert	January 13, 1917†	Thomas Dufferin Pattullo	Liberal	Thomas Dufferin Pattullo	Liberal	Joined Executive Council	Yes
Vancouver City	December 21, 1916	Ralph Smith	Liberal	Ralph Smith	Liberal	Joined Executive Council	Yes
Vancouver City	December 21, 1916	Malcolm MacDonald	Liberal	Malcolm MacDonald	Liberal	Joined Executive Council	Yes

† Won by acclamation; this date is the date of the return of the writ.

~ 'Independent people's candidate', also endorsed by the Liberal Party.

* Endorsed by the United Mineworkers of America and "organized labour generally".

== 13th Parliament 1912–1916 ==
By-election	Date	Incumbent	Party	Winner	Party	Cause	Retained
Victoria City	March 4, 1916	Richard McBride	Conservative	Harlan Carey Brewster	Liberal	Resignation	No
Vancouver City	February 26, 1916	Charles Edward Tisdall	Conservative	Malcolm MacDonald	Liberal	Joined Executive Council	No
Rossland City	February 26, 1916	Lorne Argyle Campbell	Conservative	Lorne Argyle Campbell	Conservative	Joined Executive Council	Yes
The Islands	December 6, 1913	Albert Edward McPhillips	Conservative	William Foster	Conservative	Resignation	Yes

== 12th Parliament 1909–1912 ==
By-election	Date	Incumbent	Party	Winner	Party	Cause	Retained
Yale	December 24, 1910†	Richard McBride	Conservative	Alexander Lucas	Conservative	Won more than one district	Yes
Fernie	October 22, 1910	William Ross	Conservative	William Ross	Conservative	Joined Executive Council	Yes

† Won by acclamation; this date is the date of the return of the writ.

== 11th Parliament 1907–1909 ==
By-election	Date	Incumbent	Party	Winner	Party	Cause	Retained
Revelstoke	January 16, 1909	Thomas Taylor	Conservative	Thomas Taylor	Conservative	Joined Executive Council	Yes
Nanaimo City	January 12, 1909	James Hawthornthwaite	Socialist	James Hawthornthwaite	Socialist	Resignation	Yes
Vancouver City	August 3, 1907	William John Bowser	Conservative	William John Bowser	Conservative	Joined Executive Council	Yes
Dewdney	April 17, 1907†	Richard McBride	Conservative	William J. Manson	Conservative	Won More Than One District	Yes
Atlin	April 5, 1907†	Henry Young	Conservative	Henry Young	Conservative	Joined Executive Council	Yes

† Won by acclamation; this date is the date of the return of the writ.

== 10th Parliament 1903–1907 ==
The August 16 by-election in the district of Lillooet is the last time a by-election had been held due to a voided result, as of March 2008. The November 18, 1903 by-election in Vancouver City is the first by-election held since political parties were introduced to the province.

By-election	Date	Incumbent	Party	Winner	Party	Cause	Retained
Alberni	July 22, 1905	William McInnes	Liberal	William Manson	Conservative	Resignation	No
Lillooet	August 16, 1904	Archibald McDonald	Conservative	Archibald McDonald	Conservative	Voided result	Yes
Kamloops	June 30, 1904†	Frederick John Fulton	Conservative	Frederick John Fulton	Conservative	Joined Executive Council	Yes
Vancouver City	November 18, 1903	Charles Wilson	Conservative	Charles Wilson	Conservative	Joined Executive Council	Yes

† Won by acclamation; this date is the date of the return of the writ.

== 9th Parliament 1900–1903 ==
By-election	Date	Incumbent	Party	Winner	Party	Cause	Retained
South Victoria	July 4, 1900†	David Eberts	No Parties	David Eberts	No Parties	Joined Executive Council	Yes
Victoria City	July 4, 1900†	John Turner	No Parties	John Turner	No Parties	Joined Executive Council	Yes
East Kootenay North	July 17, 1900†	Wilmer Wells	No Parties	Wilmer Wells	No Parties	Joined Executive Council	Yes
Lillooet East	July 17, 1900†	James Prentice	No Parties	James Prentice	No Parties	Joined Executive Council	Yes
South Nanaimo	July 17, 1900†	James Dunsmuir	No Parties	James Dunsmuir	No Parties	Joined Executive Council	Yes
Westminster-Dewdney	July 17, 1900†	Richard McBride	No Parties	Richard McBride	No Parties	Joined Executive Council	Yes
Nanaimo City	February 20, 1901†	Ralph Smith	No Parties	James Hawthornthwaite	No Parties	Resignation	n/a
Vancouver City	February 19, 1901	James Garden	No Parties	James Garden	No Parties	Resignation	Yes
New Westminster City	September 18, 1901	John Brown	No Parties	Thomas Gifford	No Parties	Joined Executive Council	No
Victoria City	March 10, 1902	John Turner	No Parties	Edward Gawler Prior	No Parties	Resignation	n/a
North Nanaimo	December 15, 1902	William McInnes	No Parties	William McInnes	No Parties	Joined Executive Council	Yes
North Victoria	December 23, 1902	John Booth	No Parties	Thomas Paterson	No Parties	Death	n/a
Yale-West	February 26, 1903	Dennis Murphy	No Parties	Charles Augustus Semlin	No Parties	Joined Executive Council	No

† Won by acclamation; this date is the date of the return of the writ.

== 8th Parliament 1898–1900 ==
By-election	Date	Incumbent	Party	Winner	Party	Cause	Retained
Vancouver City	October 15, 1898†	Francis Lovett Carter-Cotton	No Parties	Francis Lovett Carter-Cotton	No Parties	Joined Executive Council	Yes
Vancouver City	October 15, 1898†	Joseph Martin	No Parties	Joseph Martin	No Parties	Joined Executive Council	Yes
Yale-West	October 15, 1898†	Charles Augustus Semlin	No Parties	Charles Augustus Semlin	No Parties	Joined Executive Council	Yes
West Kootenay-Nelson	October 15, 1898†	John Hume	No Parties	John Hume	No Parties	Joined Executive Council	Yes
Alberni	December 15, 1898	Alan Neill	No Parties	Alan Neill	No Parties	Resignation	Yes
Cowichan	December 28, 1898	William Robertson	No Parties	William Robertson	No Parties	Resignation	Yes
Vancouver City	January 25, 1899†	Charles Edward Tisdall	No Parties	Charles Edward Tisdall	No Parties	Resignation	Yes
Victoria City	February 2, 1899	Richard Hall	No Parties	Richard Hall	No Parties	Resignation	Yes
Victoria City	February 2, 1899	John Turner	No Parties	John Turner	No Parties	Resignation	Yes
Victoria City	February 2, 1899	Albert McPhillips	No Parties	Albert McPhillips	No Parties	Resignation	Yes
West Kootenay-Nelson	February 14, 1899	John Hume	No Parties	John Hume	No Parties	Resignation	Yes
East Kootenay North	February 28, 1899†	William Neilson	No Parties	Wilmer Wells	No Parties	Death	n/a
New Westminster City	August 31, 1899†	Alexander Henderson	No Parties	Alexander Henderson	No Parties	Joined Executive Council	Yes

† Won by acclamation; this date is the date of the return of the writ.

== 7th Parliament 1894–1898 ==
By-election	Date	Incumbent	Party	Winner	Party	Cause	Retained
Yale-North	November 14, 1894†	George Martin	No Parties	George Martin	No Parties	Joined Executive Council	Yes
South Victoria	April 15, 1895†	David Eberts	No Parties	David Eberts	No Parties	Joined Executive Council	Yes
Cowichan-Alberni	April 18, 1895	Theodore Davie	No Parties	Thomas Wood*	No Parties	Resignation	n/a
Lillooet East	June 1, 1895	n/a	No Parties	David Stoddart	No Parties	Voided result	n/a
Cowichan-Alberni	October 5, 1895	n/a	No Parties	George Huff	No Parties	Voided result	n/a
Westminster-Chilliwhack	May 7, 1897	Thomas Kitchen	No Parties	Adam Vedder	No Parties	Death	n/a

* Result was voided.

† Won by acclamation; this date is the date of the return of the writ.

== 6th Parliament 1890–1894 ==
By-election	Date	Incumbent	Party	Winner	Party	Cause	Retained
Westminster	November 7, 1890	John Robson	No Parties	Colin Sword	No Parties	Won more than one district	n/a
Cariboo	January 14, 1891	Joseph Mason	No Parties	Ithiel Nason	No Parties	Death	n/a
East Kootenay	July 30, 1892†	James Baker	No Parties	James Baker	No Parties	Joined Executive Council	Yes
Cariboo	August 24, 1892	John Robson	No Parties	Hugh Watt	No Parties	Death	n/a
Cariboo	October 4, 1893	Ithiel Nason	No Parties	William Adams	No Parties	Death	n/a

† Won by acclamation; this date is the date of the return of the writ.

== 5th Parliament 1886–1890 ==
By-election	Date	Incumbent	Party	Winner	Party	Cause	Retained
New Westminster City	November 25, 1889	William Bole	No Parties	Thomas Cunningham	No Parties	Resignation	n/a
Lillooet	September 21, 1889	A.E.B. Davie	No Parties	Alfred Smith	No Parties	Death	n/a
Victoria City	August 21, 1889	Theodore Davie	No Parties	Theodore Davie	No Parties	Joined Executive Council	Yes
Nanaimo	June 29, 1889†	Robert Dunsmuir	No Parties	Andrew Haslam	No Parties	Death	n/a
Cariboo	November 26, 1888	Robert McLeese	No Parties	Ithiel Nason	No Parties	Resignation	n/a
Victoria	June 30, 1888	Robert John	No Parties	James Tolmie	No Parties	Resignation	n/a
Victoria City	January 25, 1888	Edward Gawler Prior	No Parties	Simeon Duck	No Parties	Resignation	n/a
Comox	December 30, 1887	Anthony Stenhouse	No Parties	Thomas Humphreys	No Parties	Resignation	n/a
Victoria City	August 20, 1887	John Turner	No Parties	John Turner	No Parties	Joined Executive Council	Yes
Cowichan	May 5, 1887	William Smithe	No Parties	Henry Fry	No Parties	Death	n/a
Yale	April 28, 1887	Forbes Vernon	No Parties	Forbes Vernon	No Parties	Joined Executive Council	Yes
Nanaimo	January 3, 1887	William Raybould	No Parties	George Thomson	No Parties	Death	n/a

† Won by acclamation; this date is the date of the return of the writ.

== 4th Parliament 1882–1886 ==
By-election	Date	Incumbent	Party	Winner	Party	Cause	Retained
Victoria City	April 15, 1885	Simeon Duck	No Parties	Simeon Duck	No Parties	Joined Executive Council	Yes
New Westminster City	April 21, 1884	William Armstrong	No Parties	James Cunningham	No Parties	Resignation	n/a
Lillooet	March 31, 1883†	A.E.B. Davie	No Parties	A.E.B. Davie	No Parties	Joined Executive Council	Yes
Cowichan	March 31, 1883†	William Smithe	No Parties	William Smithe	No Parties	Joined Executive Council	Yes
New Westminster	March 31, 1883†	John Robson	No Parties	John Robson	No Parties	Joined Executive Council	Yes
Yale	October 13, 1882	Preston Bennett	No Parties	George Martin	No Parties	Death	n/a
New Westminster City	September 4, 1882	William Armstrong	No Parties	William Armstrong	No Parties	Joined Executive Council	Yes

† Won by acclamation; this date is the date of the return of the writ.

== 3rd Parliament 1878–1882 ==
By-election	Date	Incumbent	Party	Winner	Party	Cause	Retained
New Westminster City	December 20, 1881†	Ebenezer Brown	No Parties	William Armstrong	No Parties	Resignation	n/a
Cariboo	October 29, 1879	John Evans	No Parties	George Ferguson	No Parties	Death	n/a
Cariboo	August 3, 1878†	George Anthony Walkem	No Parties	George Anthony Walkem	No Parties	Joined Executive Council	Yes
Victoria City	July 10, 1878†	Robert Beaven	No Parties	Robert Beaven	No Parties	Joined Executive Council	Yes
Victoria	July 10, 1878†	Thomas Humphreys	No Parties	Thomas Humphreys	No Parties	Joined Executive Council	Yes

† Won by acclamation; this date is the date of the return of the writ.

== 2nd Parliament 1875–1878 ==
By-election	Date	Incumbent	Party	Winner	Party	Cause	Retained
Kootenay	December 20, 1877	William Milby	No Parties	Robert Galbraith	No Parties	Death	n/a
Cariboo	June 20, 1877	A.E.B. Davie	No Parties	George Cowan	No Parties	Joined Executive Council	No
Nanaimo	January 19, 1877	John Bryden	No Parties	David William Gordon	No Parties	Resignation	n/a
Kootenay	August 24, 1876	Arthur Vowell	No Parties	William Milby	No Parties	Resignation	n/a
Cowichan	August 14, 1876†	William Smithe	No Parties	William Smithe	No Parties	Joined Executive Council	Yes
Yale	March 11, 1876	Forbes Vernon	No Parties	Forbes Vernon	No Parties	Joined Executive Council	Yes
Victoria City	February 21, 1876	Andrew Elliott	No Parties	Andrew Elliott	No Parties	Joined Executive Council	Yes
Victoria	February 15, 1876†	Thomas Humphreys	No Parties	Thomas Humphreys	No Parties	Joined Executive Council	Yes

† Won by acclamation; this date is the date of the return of the writ.

== 1st Parliament 1871–1875 ==
By-election	Date	Incumbent	Party	Winner	Party	Cause	Retained
Lillooet	November 17, 1874	Thomas Humphreys	No Parties	Thomas Humphreys	No Parties	Resignation	Yes
Lillooet	November 17, 1874	William Saul	No Parties	William Brown	No Parties	Resignation	No
Victoria	February 26, 1874	Arthur Bunster	No Parties	William Robertson	No Parties	Resignation	n/a
Victoria	February 26, 1874	Amor de Cosmos	No Parties	William Fraser Tolmie	No Parties	Resignation	n/a
New Westminster	March 21, 1873†	William Armstrong	No Parties	William Armstrong	No Parties	Joined Executive Council	Yes
Comox	January 11, 1873†	John Ash	No Parties	John Ash	No Parties	Joined Executive Council	Yes
Victoria City	January 6, 1873†	Robert Beaven	No Parties	Robert Beaven	No Parties	Joined Executive Council	Yes
Lillooet	December 21, 1872	Andrew Jamieson	No Parties	William Saul	No Parties	Death	n/a
Cariboo	June 22, 1872	Cornelius Booth	No Parties	John Barnston	No Parties	Resignation	n/a
Cariboo	February 12, 1872†	George Anthony Walkem	No Parties	George Anthony Walkem	No Parties	Joined Executive Council	Yes
New Westminster City	November 27, 1871†	Henry Holbrook	No Parties	Henry Holbrook	No Parties	Joined Executive Council	Yes
Esquimalt	November 27, 1871†	Alexander Robertson	No Parties	Alexander Robertson	No Parties	Joined Executive Council	Yes

† Won by acclamation; this date is the date of the return of the writ.

== See also ==
- List of federal by-elections in Canada
