= 7th Parliament of British Columbia =

The 7th Legislative Assembly of British Columbia sat from 1894 to 1898. The members were elected in the British Columbia general election held in July 1894. Theodore Davie served as Premier until 1895 when he was named Chief Justice for the Supreme Court. John Herbert Turner succeeded Davie as Premier.

David Williams Higgins served as speaker until March 1898 when he resigned. John Paton Booth served as speaker for the remainder of 1898.

== Members of the 7th Parliament ==
The following members were elected to the assembly in 1894:

Member	Electoral district	Party	First elected / previously elected	No.# of term(s)
William Adams	Cariboo	Government (Note: Government candidates supported the Davie administration)	1894	2nd term
Samuel Augustus Rogers	Cariboo	Government	1890	2nd term
John Irving	Cassiar	Government	1894	1st term
Joseph Hunter	Comox	Government	1871, 1890	3rd term*
Theodore Davie	Cowichan-Alberni	Government	1882	4th term
James Mitchell Mutter	Cowichan-Alberni	Government	1894	1st term
Thomas Anthony Wood (1895)	Cowichan-Alberni	Government	1895	1st term
George Albert Huff (1895)	Cowichan-Alberni	Government	1895	1st term
James Baker	East Kootenay	Government	1886	3rd term
David Williams Higgins	Esquimalt	Government	1886	3rd term
Charles Edward Pooley	Esquimalt	Government	1882	4th term
James Douglas Prentice	Lillooet East	Opposition (Note: opposed to the Davie administration)	1894	1st term
David Alexander Stoddart (1895)	Lillooet East	Government	1890, 1895	2nd term*
Alfred Wellington Smith	Lillooet West	Government	1889	3rd term
James McGregor	Nanaimo City	Government	1894	1st term
James Buckham Kennedy	New Westminster City	Opposition	1894	1st term
John Bryden	North Nanaimo	Government	1875, 1894	2nd term*
John Paton Booth	North Victoria	Government	1871, (Note: Cowichan) 1890	3rd term*
William Wymond Walkem	South Nanaimo	Government	1894	1st term
David McEwen Eberts	South Victoria	Government	1890	2nd term
Francis Lovett Carter-Cotton	Vancouver City	Opposition	1890	2nd term
Robert Macpherson	Vancouver City	Opposition	1894	1st term
Adolphus Williams	Vancouver City	Opposition	1894	1st term
John Braden	Victoria City	Government	1894	1st term
Henry Dallas Helmcken	Victoria City	Government	1894	1st term
Robert Paterson Rithet	Victoria City	Government	1894	1st term
John Herbert Turner	Victoria City	Government	1886	3rd term
James M. Kellie	West Kootenay North	Government	1890	2nd term
John Frederick Hume	West Kootenay South	Opposition	1894	1st term
Thomas Edwin Kitchen	Westminster-Chilliwhack	Opposition	1890	2nd term
Adam Swart Vedder (1897)	Westminster-Chilliwhack	Opposition	1897	1st term
Thomas William Forster	Westminster-Delta	Opposition	1890	2nd term
Colin Buchanan Sword	Westminster-Dewdney	Opposition	1890	2nd term
Thomas Kidd	Westminster-Richmond	Opposition	1894	1st term
Donald Graham	Yale-East	Opposition	1894	1st term
George Bohun Martin	Yale-North	Government	1882	4th term
Charles Augustus Semlin	Yale-West	Opposition	1871, 1882	5th term*

== By-elections ==
By-elections were held for the following members appointed to the provincial cabinet, as was required at the time:

- George Bohun Martin, Commissioner of Lands and Works, acclaimed November 15, 1894
- David McEwen Eberts, Attorney General, acclaimed April 15, 1895

By-elections were held to replace members for various other reasons:

Electoral district	Member elected	Election date	Reason
Cowichan-Alberni	Thomas Anthony Wood	April 18, 1895	T. Davie appointed to BC Superior Court February 23, 1895
Lillooet East	David Alexander Stoddart	June 1, 1895	Election contested and seat declared vacant
Cowichan-Alberni	George Albert Huff	October 5, 1895	Previous by-election declared void
Westminster-Chilliwhack	Adam Swart Vedder	May 7, 1897	Death of T.E. Kitchen April 5, 1897
