= 8th Parliament of British Columbia =

The 8th Legislative Assembly of British Columbia sat from 1899 to 1900. The members were elected in the British Columbia general election held in July 1898. Robert Beaven was asked to form a government but was not able to garner sufficient support, so Charles Augustus Semlin became premier. After a major government bill was defeated in February 1900, Semlin's government was dismissed. Joseph Martin succeeded Semlin but his government was subsequently defeated on a motion of no-confidence. An election followed later that year.

William Thomas Forster served as speaker.

== Members of the 8th Parliament ==
The following members were elected to the assembly in 1898:

Member	Electoral district	Party	First elected / previously elected	No.# of term(s)
Alan Webster Neill	Alberni	Opposition (Note: opposed to the Turner administration)	1898	1st term
Hans Lars Helgesen	Cariboo	Opposition	1878, (Note: Esquimalt) 1898	3rd term*
John Charlton Kinchant	Cariboo	Opposition	1898	1st term
Charles William Digby Clifford	Cassiar	Government (Note: Government candidates supported the Turner administration)	1898	1st term
John Irving	Cassiar	Government	1894	2nd term
James Dunsmuir	Comox	Government	1898	1st term
William Russell Robertson	Cowichan	Government	1898	1st term
William George Neilson	East Kootenay North	Government	1898	1st term
Wilmer Cleveland Wells (1899)	East Kootenay North	Government	1899	1st term
James Baker	East Kootenay South	Government	1886	4th term
David Williams Higgins	Esquimalt	Opposition	1886	4th term
Charles Edward Pooley	Esquimalt	Government	1882	5th term
James Douglas Prentice	Lillooet East	Opposition	1894, 1898	2nd term*
Alfred Wellington Smith	Lillooet West	Government	1889	4th term
Robert Edward McKechnie	Nanaimo City	Opposition	1898	1st term
Alexander Henderson	New Westminster City	Government	1898	1st term
John Bryden	North Nanaimo	Government	1875, 1894	3rd term*
John Paton Booth	North Victoria	Government	1871, (Note: Cowichan) 1890	4th term*
Ralph Smith	South Nanaimo	Labour (Note: Ran as Labour-Oppositionist; opposed to Turner administration)	1898	1st term
David McEwen Eberts	South Victoria	Government	1890	3rd term
Francis Lovett Carter-Cotton	Vancouver City	Opposition	1890	3rd term
Robert Macpherson	Vancouver City	Opposition	1894	2nd term
Joseph Martin	Vancouver City	Opposition	1898	1st term
Charles Edward Tisdall	Vancouver City	Opposition	1898	1st term
Richard Hall	Victoria City	Government	1898	1st term
Henry Dallas Helmcken	Victoria City	Government	1894	2nd term
Albert Edward McPhillips	Victoria City	Government	1898	1st term
John Herbert Turner	Victoria City	Government	1886	4th term
John Frederick Hume	West Kootenay-Nelson	Opposition	1894	2nd term
James M. Kellie	West Kootenay-Revelstoke	Opposition	1890	3rd term
James Morris Martin	West Kootenay-Rossland	Opposition	1898	1st term
Robert Francis Green	West Kootenay-Slocan	Opposition	1898	1st term
Charles William Munro	Westminster-Chilliwhack	Opposition	1898	1st term
Thomas William Forster	Westminster-Delta	Opposition	1890	3rd term
Richard McBride	Westminster-Dewdney	Government	1898	1st term
Thomas Kidd	Westminster-Richmond	Opposition	1894	2nd term
Price Ellison	Yale-East	Government	1898	1st term
Francis John Deane	Yale-North	Opposition	1898	1st term
Charles Augustus Semlin	Yale-West	Opposition	1871, 1882	6th term*

== By-elections ==
By-elections were held for the following members appointed to the provincial cabinet, as was required at the time:

- Francis Lovett Carter-Cotton, Minister of Finance, acclaimed October 15, 1898
- Joseph Martin, Attorney General, acclaimed October 15, 1898
- Charles Augustus Semlin, Premier, acclaimed October 15, 1898
- John Frederick Hume, Provincial Secretary and Minister of Mines, acclaimed October 15, 1898
- Alexander Henderson, Attorney General, acclaimed August 31, 1899

By-elections were held to replace members for various other reasons:

Electoral district	Member elected	Election date	Reason
Alberni	Alan Webster Neill	December 15, 1898	A.W. Neill resigned, having accepted money from government for road work done after the election
Cowichan	William Russell Robertson	December 28, 1898	W. R. Robertson resigned, having accepted money from government for work done after the election
Vancouver City	Charles Edward Tisdall	January 25, 1899 (Note: Acclaimed)	C.E. Tisdall resigned; a clerk in his store sold cartridges to a provincial police officer
Victoria City	Richard Hall	February 2, 1899	R. Hall resigned; his company sold coal to Government House
Victoria City	Albert Edward McPhillips	February 2, 1899	A.E. McPhillips resigned; a fee was paid to his firm
Victoria City	John Herbert Turner	February 2, 1899	J.H. Turner resigned; a branch of his firm sold goods to the government
East Kootenay North	Wilmer Cleveland Wells	February 28, 1899	Death of W.G. Nielson January 6, 1899
West Kootenay-Nelson	John Frederick Hume	February 28, 1899	J.F. Hume resigned; a police constable and prisoner had stayed at his hotel

== Other changes ==
- Vancouver City (Joseph Martin res. on appointment as premier, February 28, 1900)
