= 5th Parliament of British Columbia =

The 5th Legislative Assembly of British Columbia sat from 1887 to 1890. The members were elected in the British Columbia general election held in July 1886. William Smithe formed a government. Following his death in May 1887, Alexander Edmund Batson Davie became premier. After Davie died in 1889, John Robson became premier.

There were four sessions of the 5th Legislature:

Session	Start	End
1st	January 24, 1887	April 7, 1887
2nd	January 27, 1888	April 28, 1888
3rd	January 31, 1889	April 6, 1889
4th	January 23, 1890	April 26, 1890

Charles Edward Pooley served as speaker from 1887 until 1889 when he was named to cabinet. David Williams Higgins succeeded Pooley as speaker.

== Members of the 5th Parliament ==
The following members were elected to the assembly in 1886:

Member	Electoral district	Party	First elected / previously elected	No.# of term(s)
George Cowan	Cariboo	Government (Note: Government candidate supporting the Smithe administration)	1877	4th term
Robert McLeese	Cariboo	Opposition (Note: opposed to the Smithe administration)	1882	2nd term
Joseph Mason	Cariboo	Government	1886	1st term
Ithiel Blake Nason (1888)	Cariboo	Government	1888	1st term
John Grant	Cassiar	Opposition	1882	2nd term
Anthony Maitland Stenhouse	Comox	Opposition	1886	1st term
Thomas Basil Humphreys (1887)	Comox	Independent Opposition	1871, (Note: Lillooet) 1887	4th term*
Henry Croft	Cowichan	Government	1886	1st term
William Smithe	Cowichan	Government	1871	5th term
Henry Fry (1887)	Cowichan	Government	1887	1st term
David Williams Higgins	Esquimalt	Government	1886	1st term
Charles Edward Pooley	Esquimalt	Government	1882	2nd term
James Baker	Kootenay	Government	1886	1st term
Edward Allen	Lillooet	Government	1882	2nd term
Alexander Edmund Batson Davie	Lillooet	Government	1875, 1882	3rd term*
Alfred Wellington Smith (1889)	Lillooet	Government	1889	1st term
Robert Dunsmuir	Nanaimo	Government	1882	2nd term
William Raybould	Nanaimo	Government	1882	2nd term
George Thomson (1887)	Nanaimo	Independent	1887	1st term
Andrew Haslam (1889)	Nanaimo	Government	1889	1st term
William Henry Ladner	New Westminster	Opposition	1886	1st term
James Orr	New Westminster	Opposition	1882	2nd term
John Robson	New Westminster	Government	1871, (Note: Nanaimo) 1882	3rd term*
William Norman Bole	New Westminster City	Opposition	1886	1st term
Thomas Cunningham (1889)	New Westminster City	Government	1889	1st term
George William Anderson	Victoria	Government	1886	1st term
Robert Franklin John	Victoria	Government	1882	2nd term
James Tolmie (1889)	Victoria	Government	1889	1st term
Robert Beaven	Victoria City	Opposition	1871	5th term
Theodore Davie	Victoria City	Government	1882	2nd term
Edward Gawler Prior	Victoria City	Government	1886	1st term
John Herbert Turner	Victoria City	Government	1886	1st term
Simeon Duck (1888)	Victoria City	Government	1871, 1882, 1888	3rd term*
George Bohun Martin	Yale	Government	1882	2nd term
Charles Augustus Semlin	Yale	Opposition	1871, 1882	3rd term*
Forbes George Vernon	Yale	Government	1875, 1886	3rd term*

== By-elections ==
By-elections were held for the following members appointed to the provincial cabinet, as was required at the time:

- Forbes George Vernon, Chief Commissioner of Lands and Works, elected June 4, 1887
- John Herbert Turner, Minister of Finance, elected September 1, 1887
- Theodore Davie, Attorney General, elected September 1, 1889

By-elections were held to replace members for various other reasons:

Electoral district	Member elected	Election date	Reason
Nanaimo	George Thomson	January 3, 1887	death of W. Raybould on December 3, 1886
Cowichan	Henry Fry	May 5, 1887	death of W. Smithe on March 28, 1887
Comox	Thomas Basil Humphreys	December 30, 1887	A.M. Stenhouse resigned his seat to join the LDS Church
Victoria City	Simeon Duck	January 25, 1888	E.G. Prior resigned his seat to contest federal by-election
Victoria	James Tolmie	June 30, 1888	R.F. John resigned his seat to become warden of provincial jail in Victoria
Cariboo	Ithiel Blake Nason	November 26, 1888	R. McLeese resigned his seat to contest federal by-electinn
Nanaimo	Andrew Haslam	June 14, 1889 (Note: Acclaimed)	death of R. Dunsmuir on April 12, 1889
Lillooet	Alfred Wellington Smith	September 21, 1889	death of A.E.B. Davie on August 1, 1889
New Westminster City	Thomas Cunningham	November 25, 1889	resignation of H.N. Bole after being named to County Court of B.C.

== Other changes ==
- Lillooet (dec. Edward Allen, March 31, 1890)
