= 1898 British Columbia general election =

Canadian provincial election

The 1898 British Columbia general election was held in 1898. It was held to elect members of the Legislative Assembly of British Columbia.

Unlike in the previous BC general election, in 1898 of the 38 MLAs 24 were elected in single member districts. There were also three 2-member districts and two 4-member districts. Each voter could cast as many votes as there were seats to fill in the district.

== Party politics ==
There were no political parties in this election — until the 1903 election, British Columbia politics were officially non-partisan and political parties were not part of the process. This trend began to change in the 1898 and 1900 elections with the appearance of party-designated candidates and some party-declared members; for example, Ralph Smith in South Nanaimo. The political alignments designated at the time of the dropping of the writ did not necessarily have anything to do with the jockeying for power and support once the election returns were in. Therefore, members shown as "Government" or "Opposition" only ran under that slate and had no necessary allegiances or party loyalties to follow. If a new government formed from the "Opposition" slate, as here with Charles Augustus Semlin, there was nothing to say that someone who'd run under the "Government" banner might not cross the floor either to join the governing caucus, or actually be invited over to take a cabinet position.

In the table below, the seating is only as it was when the House convened. The failure of Semlin's government fell on the shoulders of an over-ambitious Joseph Martin by early 1900. He held on to power despite a petition from Members of the House to the Lieutenant-Governor, but the Lieutenant-Governor, Thomas Robert McInnes, continued to support Martin so long as there was no sitting of the House, such that a situation of non-confidence could be proven, even though Martin had only himself and one other member in his caucus. Martin held out for six months, but the inevitable sitting of the House and immediate vote of non-confidence and subsequent election removed him from power and brought in James Dunsmuir.

It was because of this debacle, born in this election and the ones that preceded it, that party politics was finally introduced to British Columbia for the 1903 election.

== Results by riding ==
Results of British Columbia general election, 1898
Government		Opposition	
Member	Riding & party	Riding & party	Member
Charles William Digby Clifford	Cassiar; Government	Alberni; Opposition	Alan Webster Neill
John Irving	Cassiar; Government	Cariboo; Opposition	Hans Lars Helgesen
James Dunsmuir	Comox; Government	Cariboo; Opposition	John Charlton Kinchant
Charles Edward Pooley	Esquimalt; Opposition	Esquimalt; Opposition	David Williams Higgins
William Russell Robertson	Cowichan; Government	Lillooet East; Opposition	James Douglas Prentice
William George Nielson	East Kootenay (north riding); Government	Nanaimo City; Opposition	Robert Edward McKechnie
James Baker	East Kootenay (south riding); Government	South Nanaimo; Labour	Ralph Smith
Alfred Wellington Smith	Lillooet West; Government	Vancouver City; Opposition	Francis Lovett Carter-Cotton
Alexander Henderson	New Westminster City; Government	Vancouver City; Opposition	Robert Macpherson
John Bryden	North Nanaimo; Government	Vancouver City; Opposition	Joseph Martin
John Paton Booth	North Victoria; Government	Vancouver City; Opposition	Charles Edward Tisdall
David McEwen Eberts	South Victoria; Government	West Kootenay-Nelson; Opposition	John Frederick Hume
Richard Hall	Victoria City; Government	West Kootenay-Revelstoke; Opposition	James M. Kellie
Henry Dallas Helmcken	Victoria City; Government	West Kootenay-Rossland; Opposition	James Morris Martin
Albert Edward McPhillips	Victoria City; Government	West Kootenay-Slocan; Opposition	Robert Francis Green
John Herbert Turner^{1}	Victoria City; Government	Westminster-Chilliwhack; Opposition	Charles William Munro
Richard McBride	Westminster-Dewdney; Government	Westminster-Delta; Opposition	Thomas William Forster
Price Ellison	Yale-East; Government	Westminster-Richmond; Opposition	Thomas Kidd
		Yale-North; Opposition	Francis John Deane
		Yale-West; Opposition	Charles Augustus Semlin^{2}
^{1} Incumbent Premier			^{2} Premier-Elect
