= 1894 British Columbia general election =

Canadian provincial election

The 1894 British Columbia general election was held in 1894. The number of members remained at 33 with the number of ridings increased to 26 as a result of the partition of the Yale and Westminster ridings.

Unlike the previous BC general election, of the 33 MLAs only 20 were elected in single member districts in 1894. There were also three 2-member districts, one 3-member district and one 4-member district. Each voter could cast as many votes as there were seats to fill in the district.

== Political context ==
=== Non-party system ===
There were to be no political parties in the new province. The designations "Government" and "Opposition" and "Independent" (and variations on these) functioned in place of parties, but they were very loose and do not represent formal coalitions, more alignments of support during the campaign. "Government" meant in support of the current Premier; "Opposition" meant campaigning against him, and often enough the Opposition would win and immediately become the Government.

Although Labour as a party had run candidates in previous election, this election saw the first victories by Labour candidates (in Nanaimo and Nanaimo City), and a "Farmer" candidate (in the second Nanaimo seat). As well a Labour-oriented Nationalist Party candidate was elected in Vancouver City - Robert Macpherson.

There were five successful independents.

=== The Robson Government ===
The government of newspaperman John Robson received a mandate after assuming power the year before. Robson died in office in 1892, yielding to Theodore Davie.

=== Byelections not shown ===
Any changes due to byelections are shown below the main table showing the theoretical composition of the House after the election. A final table showing the composition of the House at the dissolution of the Legislature at the end of this Parliament can be found below the byelections. The main table represents the immediate results of the election only, not changes in governing coalitions or eventual changes due to byelections.

=== List of ridings ===
The original ridings were thirteen in number, and Cowichan was restored to a two-member seat while Westminster (formerly New Westminster, actually the rural areas of the New Westminster Land District rather than the City of New Westminster, which was and continued to be represented by New Westminster City) was partitioned in four; Vancouver City was increased to three members from two while Cariboo was decreased to two from three. The Victoria, Nanaimo, West Kootenay and Lillooet ridings were partitioned also, and the Alberni and Cowichan ridings were combined into Cowichan-Alberni, which was a two-member seat. In addition the Nanaimo-area riding of The Islands which had appeared for the first time in 1890 election was no longer on the hustings, although it would re-appear again following the major redistribution that preceded the 1903 election. There were no political parties were not acceptable in the House by convention, though some members were openly partisan at the federal level (usually Conservative, although both Liberal and Labour allegiance were on display by some candidates).

These ridings were:

- Cariboo (three members)
- Cassiar (one member)
- Comox (one member)
- Cowichan-Alberni (two members)
- East Kootenay
- Esquimalt (two members)
- Lillooet East (one member)
- Lillooet West (one member)
- North Nanaimo (one member)
- South Nanaimo (one member)
- Nanaimo City (one member)
- New Westminster City (one member)
- North Victoria (one member)
- South Victoria (one member)
- Vancouver City (three members)
- Victoria City (four members)
- West Kootenay (north riding) (one member)
- West Kootenay (south riding) (one member)
- Westminster-Chilliwhack (one member)
- Westminster-Delta (one member)
- Westminster-Dewdney (one member)
- Westminster-Richmond (one member)
- Yale-East (one member)
- Yale-North (one member)
- Yale-West (one member)

=== Polling conditions ===
Natives (First Nations) and Chinese were disallowed from voting, although naturalized Kanakas (Hawaiian colonists) and American and West Indian blacks and certain others participated. The requirement that knowledge of English be spoken for balloting was discussed but not applied.

== Results by riding ==
Results of British Columbia general election, 1894
Government		Opposition	
Member	Riding & party	Riding & party	Member
William Adams	Cariboo; Government	Lillooet East; Opposition	James Douglas Prentice
Samuel Augustus Rogers	Cariboo; Government	New Westminster City; Opposition	James Buckham Kennedy
John Irving	Cassiar; Government	Vancouver City; Opposition	Francis Lovett Carter-Cotton
Joseph Hunter	Comox; Government	Vancouver City; Opposition	Robert Macpherson
Theodore Davie^{1}	Cowichan-Alberni; Government	Vancouver City; Opposition	Adolphus Williams
James Mitchell Mutter	Cowichan-Alberni; Government	West Kootenay (South riding); Opposition	John Frederick Hume
James Baker	East Kootenay; Government	Westminster-Dewdney; Opposition	Colin Buchanan Sword
Theodore Davie	Esquimalt; Government	Yale-East; Opposition	Donald Graham
Charles Edward Pooley	Esquimalt; Government	Westminster-Delta; Opposition	Thomas William Forster
Alfred Wellington Smith	Lillooet West; Government	Yale-West; Opposition	Charles Augustus Semlin
James McGregor	Nanaimo City; Government		
John Bryden	North Nanaimo; Government		
John Paton Booth	North Victoria; Government		
William Wymond Walkem	South Nanaimo; Government		
David McEwen Eberts	South Victoria; Government		
John Braden	Victoria City; Government		
Henry Dallas Helmcken	Victoria City; Government		
Robert Paterson Rithet	Victoria City; Government		
John Herbert Turner	Victoria City; Government		
James M. Kellie	West Kootenay (North riding); Government		
Thomas Edwin Kitchen	Westminster-Chilliwhack; Government		
Thomas Kidd	Westminster-Richmond; Government		
George Bohun Martin	Yale-North; Government		
^{1} Premier-Elect and Incumbent Premier			

== See also ==
- List of British Columbia political parties

== Further reading & references ==
- In the Sea of Sterile Mountains: The Chinese in British Columbia, Joseph Morton, J.J. Douglas, Vancouver (1974). Despite its title, a fairly thorough account of the politicians and electoral politics in early BC.

Specific
