= William Saul =

Canadian politician

William Saul was a Canadian politician. After an unsuccessful campaign in the 1871 provincial election, he represented the electoral district of Lillooet from a by-election in 1872 until his resignation in 1874. He was then defeated in an 1874 by-election and the 1875 provincial election. He was subsequently a successful candidate in the 1878 provincial election. He did not seek a third term in the 1882 provincial election and he was an unsuccessful candidate in the 1886 provincial election.

Preceded by T. B. Humphreys (Ind.); A. T. Jamieson (Ind.)	MLA of Lillooet; 1872–1874; With: T. B. Humphreys (Ind.)	Succeeded by T. B. Humphreys (Ind.); W. Brown (Ind.)
Preceded by W. Brown (Ref.); W. Morrison (Ref.)	MLA of Lillooet; 1878–1882; With: W. Brown (Opp.)	Succeeded by A. E. B. Davie (Opp.); E. Allen (Opp.)
