= Lillooet (disambiguation) =

Lillooet is a town in the Fraser Canyon in British Columbia.

Lillooet may also refer to:

- The St'at'imc people, also known as the Lillooet people
- The Lillooet language, also known under the names St'at'imcets and Ucwalmícwts
- The Lillooet Tribal Council, which is the usual English name for the largest tribal council of the St'at'imc people
- the Lillooet Indian Band is the former (though still used), name for the government now known as T'it'q'et First Nation

Lillooet is found on many geographic features:

- The Lillooet River, a tributary of the Fraser River
- Lillooet Lake, a lake on the Lillooet River
- The Lillooet Ranges, a subdivision of the Coast Mountains
- The Lillooet Icecap an icefield in the Coast Mountains, about 200k north of Vancouver and at the head of the Lillooet and Bridge Rivers
- The Lillooet Glacier, a tongue of the Lillooet Icecap which is the source of the Lillooet River
- The Lillooet Country, a region in the Southern Interior of British Columbia

It is also common in administrative names:

- the Squamish-Lillooet Regional District is a regional district in British Columbia, Canada
- the Lillooet Land District is a legal land-survey region of British Columbia dating to the founding of the colony in 1858 used in all property and legal documents
- Yale-Lillooet was a provincial electoral district or "riding" in British Columbia which superseded:
  - Lillooet (electoral district) was a historical provincial electoral district 1871–1890 and 1903–1966. It was among the province's original twelve ridings
  - Lillooet West (electoral district) was a historical provincial electoral district in the 1894, 1898 and 1890 British Columbia elections
  - Lillooet East (electoral district) was a historical provincial electoral district in the 1894, 1898 and 1890 British Columbia elections
  - and parts of the original Yale riding
  - NB the original federal district including the town and area of Lillooet was Cariboo
