= William Morrison (British Columbia politician) =

Canadian politician

William Morrison was a Canadian politician. He represented the electoral district of Lillooet from 1875 to 1878.

He tried unsuccessfully to regain a seat in the Legislature in the general elections of 1878, 1882, 1886, 1890, and an 1892 provincial byelection.

Preceded by T. B. Humphreys (Ind.); W. Brown (Ind.)	MLA of Lillooet; 1875–1878; With: W. Brown (Ref.)	Succeeded by W. Saul (Opp.); W. Brown (Opp.)
