= David Stoddart =

David Stoddart may refer to:

- David Stoddart, Baron Stoddart of Swindon (1926–2020), British independent Labour politician
- David Stoddart (geographer) (1937–2014), British physical geographer
- David Alexander Stoddart (1857–1942), businessman and political figure in British Columbia
