= Vancouver Monument (Maui) =

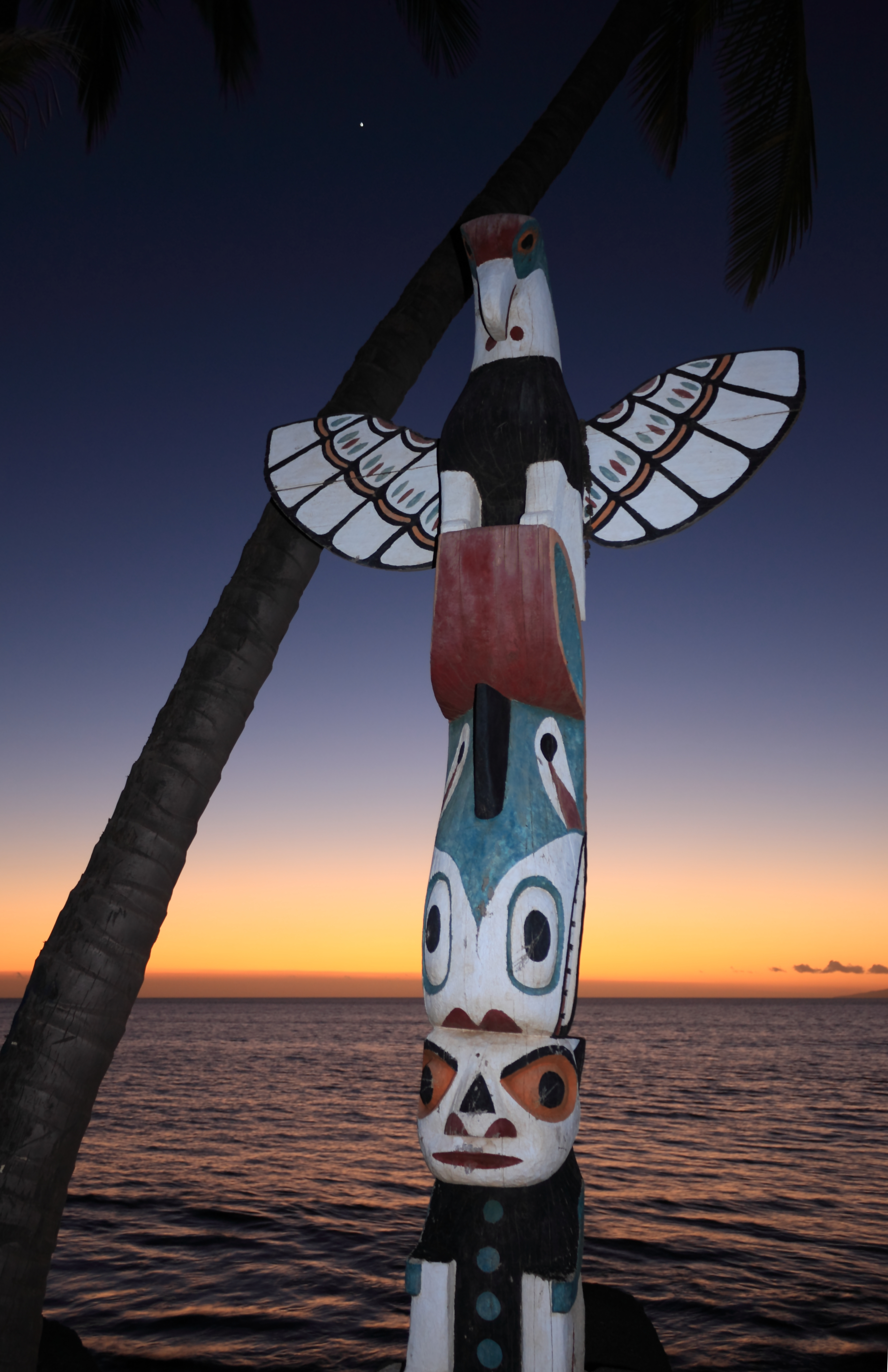
- One of the two totem poles
- Interactive map of Vancouver Monument
- Location: Kihei, Maui, Hawaii, United States
- Coordinates: 20°46′06″N 156°27′31″W
- Dedicated date: 1969
- Dedicated to: George Vancouver
- Dismantled date: after 2008

The Vancouver Monument was a memorial established in 1969 by Canadian businessman and politician Gordon Gibson on the Hawaiian island of Maui. It commemorated the arrival of Captain George Vancouver to Maui in March 1793. Two totem poles depicting thunderbirds were commissioned for the site from the Mowachaht/Muchalaht First Nations of Nootka Sound. The site fell into disuse after 2008 when the property was sold for redevelopment. Both totem poles were removed during the process and stored offsite, but were destroyed by flood damage.

== History ==
=== Vancouver Expedition ===
In March 1793, on his second voyage to the Hawaiian Islands, Vancouver's ships traveled from Kawaihae on the northwest coast of the Big Island, and "entered Maui waters on the island's eastern coast, sailed along the Southern side and up the east where, at Ma'alaea Bay, Kamohomoho, a brother of Kahekili, the ruler of Maui, appeared in a canoe and came on board to pilot the British ships to a safe anchorage at Lahaina." Vancouver later settled in the Pacific Northwest in the area of the city of his namesake, Vancouver B.C.

=== Monument ===
Canadian lumberman and politician Gordon Gibson bought land on Maui in 1956 with plans to use it as a winter home. He jokingly referred to it as "Fort Vancouver", as it was a large house in Kihei, in what was then a mostly undeveloped area of South Maui. It also faced Māʻalaea Bay, where Vancouver was rumored to have arrived in 1793. What began as a winter home for his family began to grow as guests needed rooms to stay in while visiting. The expansion continued, and by the mid-1960s, it was known as the Maui Lu Resort, the only hotel in Kihei.

Stories about Vancouver's original trip to Maui fascinated Gibson, who originally heard them from Gus Guslander, the manager of the Royal Hawaiian Hotel. Based on these stories, Gibson built his own monument to Vancouver near the beach, across the street from the Maui Lu. He commissioned two totem poles from the Mowachaht/Muchalaht First Nations of Nootka Sound in the thunderbird style. In addition to the two totem poles, the monument included a rock, a giant clam shell, and a historical cannon. It was officially dedicated on December 22, 1969, with a ceremony attended by Elmer Cravalho, the Mayor of Maui.

An interpretive stone marker in the monument claims that Vancouver brought the first cattle and root vegetables to the island and gave the Hawaiians the approval to use the Union Jack on their flag. A message from Canadian Prime Minister Pierre Trudeau also appears on a stone marker. It reads:

Aloha and Kla-How-Ya
Canada send congratulations
To Dedication Kihei Monument
To Captain George Vancouver
May the Kla-How-Ya Spirit
The Aloha Welcome
Forever Propser in These Climes
Pierre Elliott Trudeau-Prime Minister
Of Canada
Dec. 22, 1969

Almost four decades later, the Maui Lu Resort closed permanently in November 2008, with a new timeshare resort scheduled to replace it several years after a planned redevelopment of the property and a restoration of the beach area. The totem poles were moved offsite after that sometime later and put into storage. A flood destroyed them soon after.

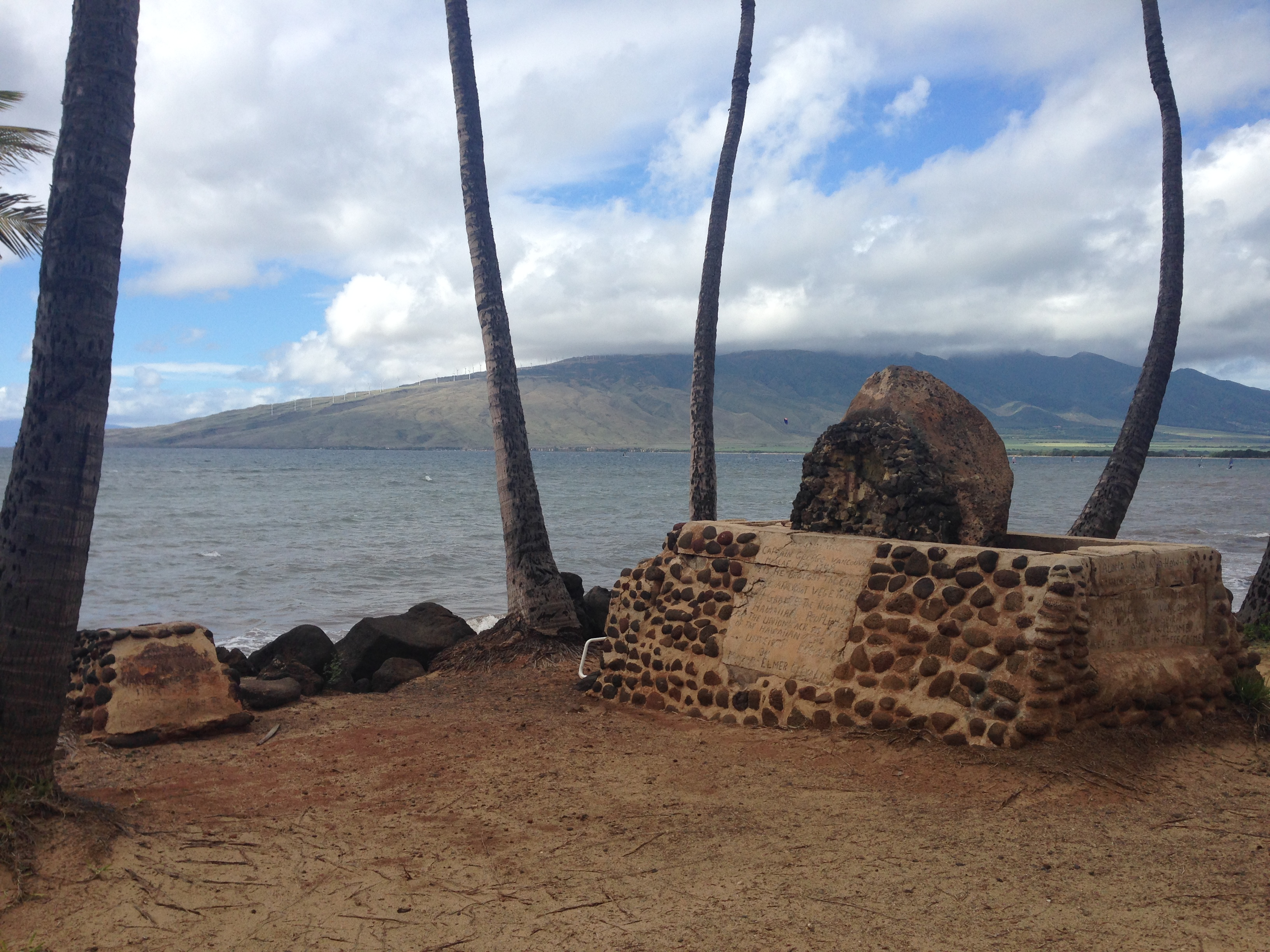

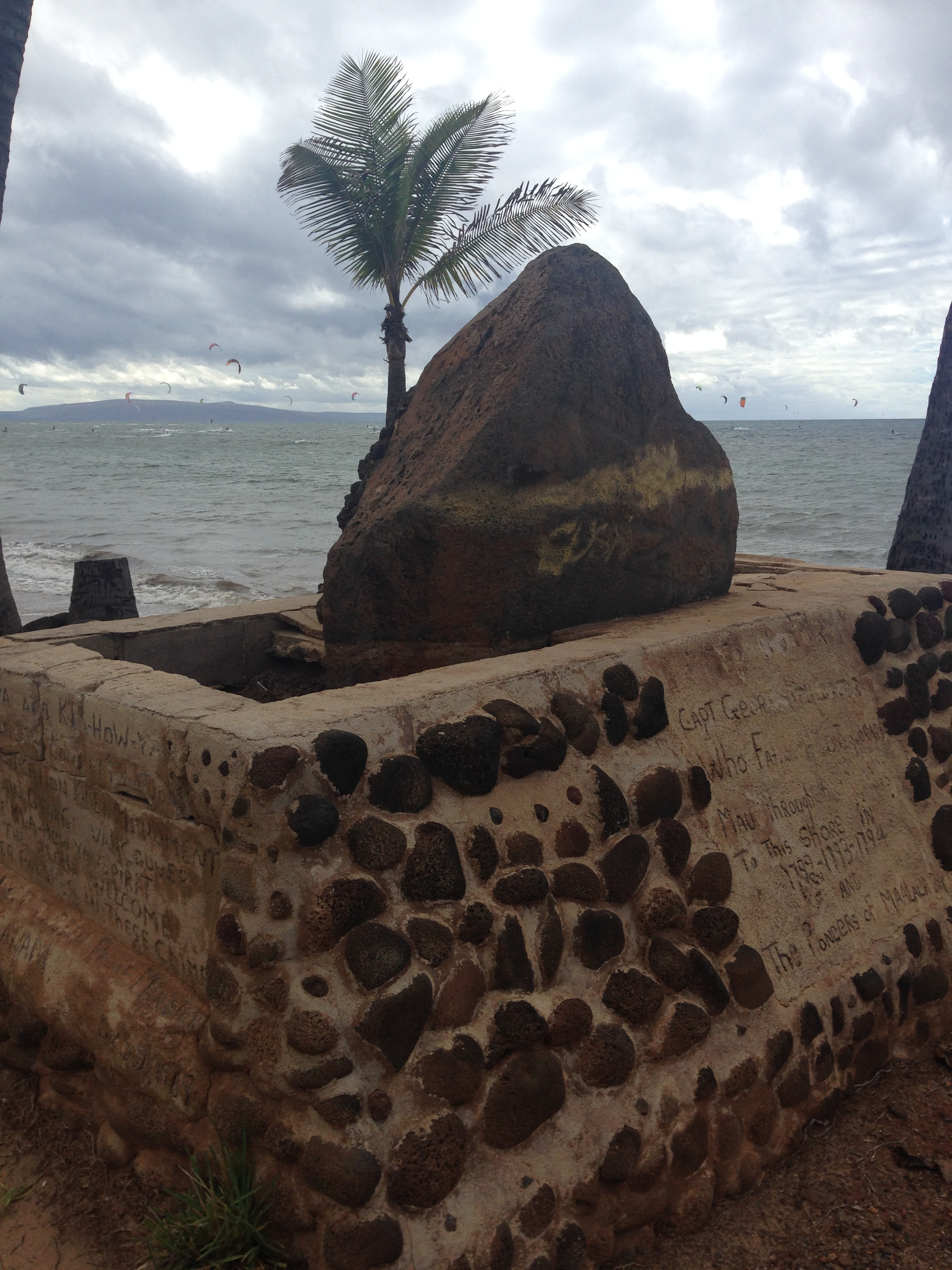

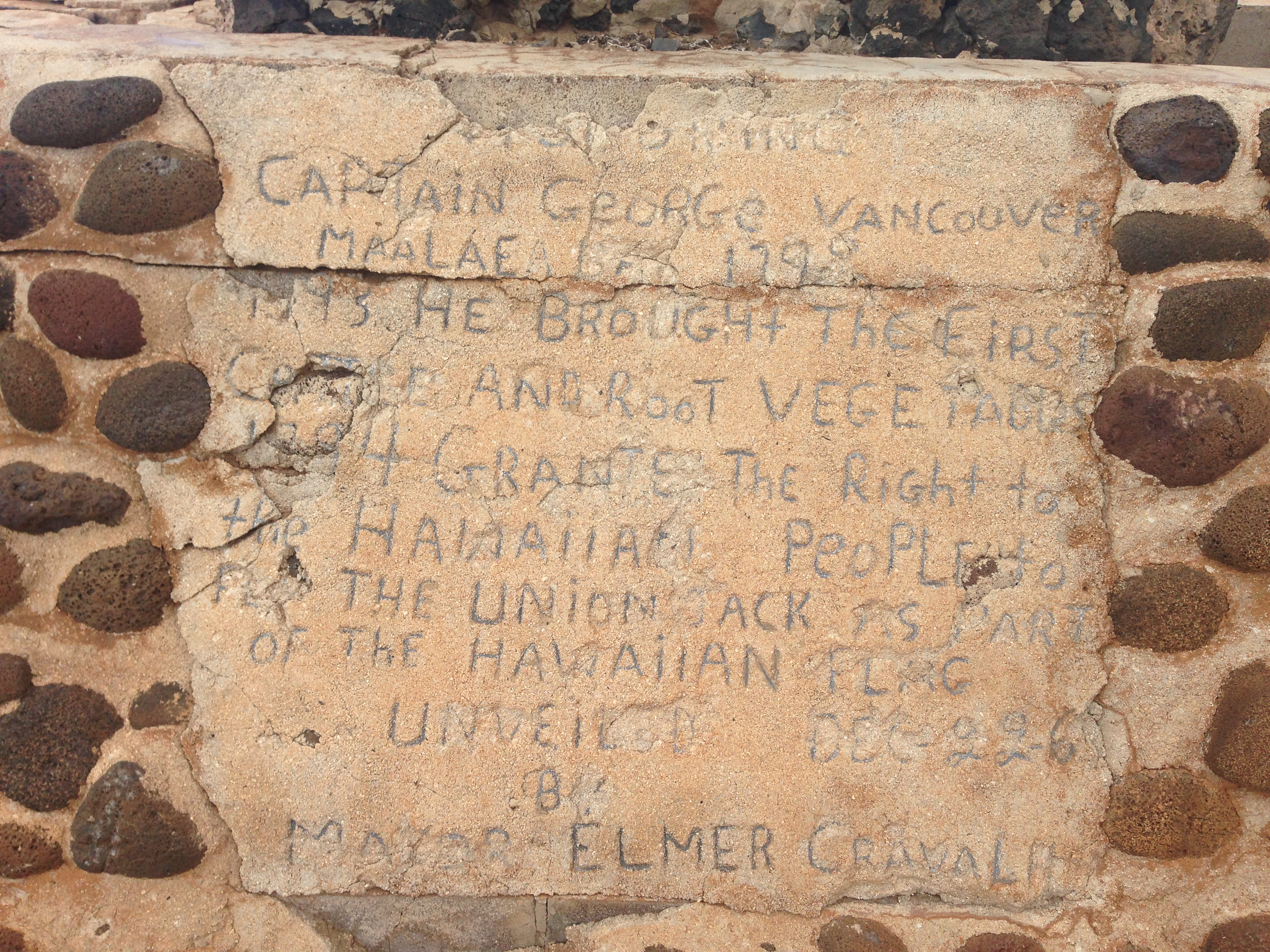

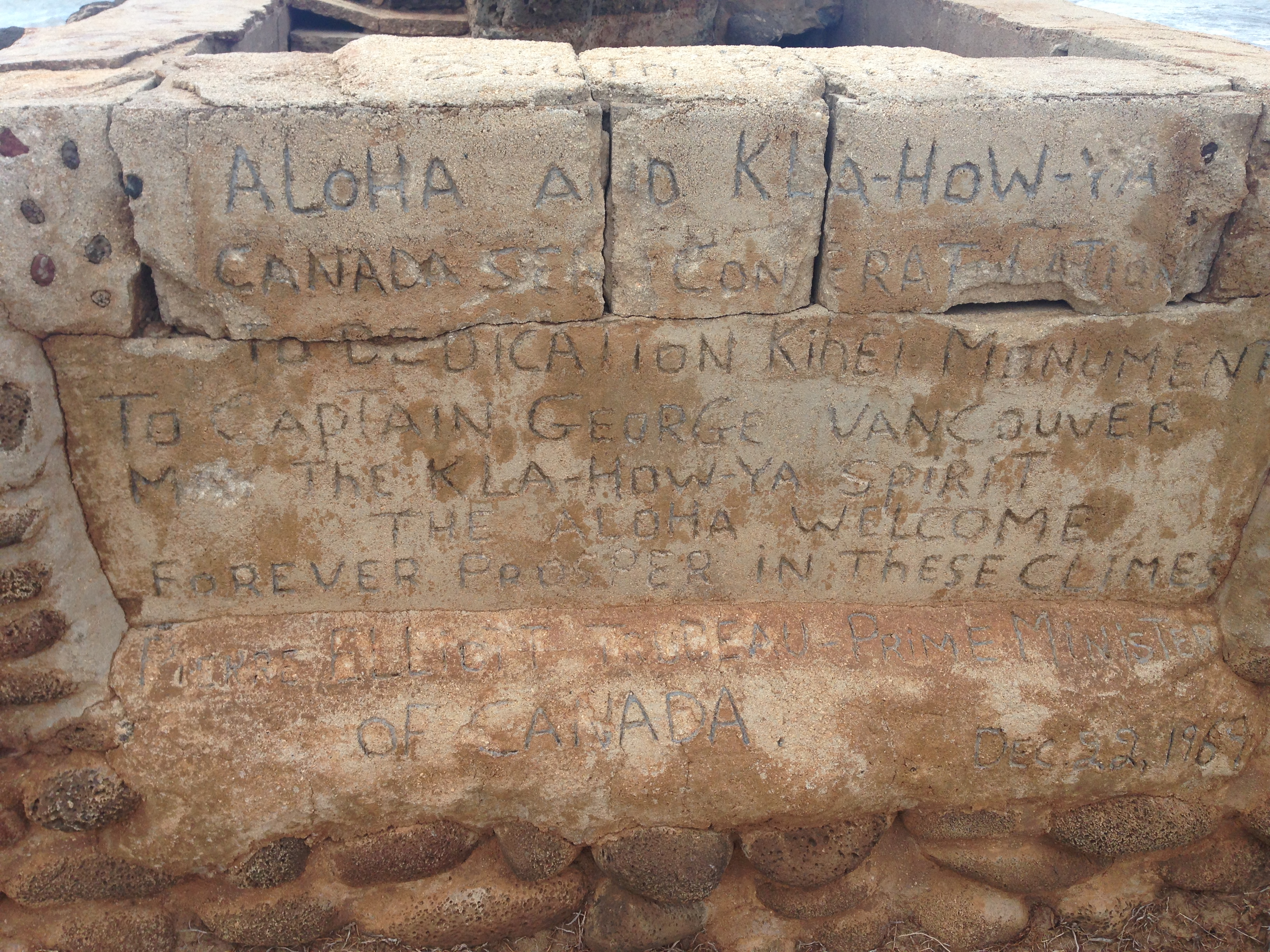
