= Springfield Ranch, British Columbia =

Springfield Ranch
- Location of Springfield Ranch in British Columbia
- Coordinates: 52°16′25″N 122°15′00″W
- Country: Canada
- Province: British Columbia

Springfield Ranch is a ranch in the Cariboo region of British Columbia, Canada, located between Williams Lake, British Columbia and Soda Creek on the former British Columbia Railway line (now part of the CN rail empire).

== History ==
In 1862, a large tract of arable land a mile south of Deep Creek was occupied by five returning miners. These were speculators who went by the name of Edward Packe & Company and who, very shortly, sold their pre-emptions to Frederick Townsend of Quesnelle Mouth. For a time, Townsend rented the land to the Beck brothers, two young Englishmen who kept up their English traditions on a certain field on the ranch still known as “the cricket field”.

By 1865, Townsend had sold the property, which now contained about a thousand acres (4 km²), to John Colin Calbraith. Calbraith took on a partner, John Frances Hawkes of Springfield, Ohio, and, between them, they produced large areas of hay and grain. By 1866, “the Springs,” as their home was known, had become a popular stop for travelers.

During the early 1870s, when John Calbraith left the Cariboo, he sold his interests in the ranch to his partner Hawkes, who renamed it “Springfield”, after his hometown in Ohio. Prior to his departure from the Cariboo in 1890, John Hawkes sold Springfield Ranch to Herman Nichols, who continued to reside in the old house built by Calbraith until March 1897, when it was destroyed by fire.

By 1900, William Adams, the new owner of Springfield Ranch, built a modern residence. Adams had a daughter Katherine, who married John Hargreaves, a Remittance Man and when Adams retired, he sold the ranch to the young couple. The Hargreaves, who operated an efficient ranch, were also known for their lavish entertaining. Their most famous houseguest was Prime Minister Mackenzie King, who visited there during the 1930s. When Hargreave’s dog barked at the distinguished visitor, King was told not to worry, for the dog only attacked Conservatives.

During John Hargreave’s tenure, Springfield Ranch grew to include over 2,000 acres (8 km²) of land. Upon his death in 1950, his son, Rae Hargreaves, continued the operation until 1963, when it was sold to C.W. Hoffman Jr. of Oregon.

== See also ==
- List of historic ranches in British Columbia
- Cariboo Road
