= Mark Robert Eagleson =

Canadian politician

Member of the Legislative Assembly of British Columbia
- In office 1907–1909
- Preceded by: Archibald McDonald
- Succeeded by: Archibald McDonald
- Constituency: Lillooet

Personal details
- Born: August 10, 1861 Newcastle, Canada West
- Died: April 8, 1917 (aged 55) Lillooet, British Columbia
- Party: British Columbia Liberal Party
- Spouse: Mary Elizabeth Eagleson
- Occupation: hotel proprietor

Mark Robert Eagleson (August 10, 1861 – April 8, 1917) was a Canadian politician. He served in the Legislative Assembly of British Columbia from 1907 to 1909 from the electoral district of Lillooet, a member of the Liberal party. He died of complications from diabetes in 1917.
