= Don Robinson (politician) =

Canadian politician (1919-1997)

Donald Frederick Robinson

Member of the British Columbia Legislative Assembly for Lillooet
- In office September 12, 1955 – August 5, 1966
- Preceded by: Gordon Gibson, Sr.
- Succeeded by: Riding abolished

Personal details
- Born: 1919 Calgary, Alberta
- Died: January 9, 1997 (aged 77) Calgary, Alberta
- Party: British Columbia Social Credit Party
- Occupation: locomotive engineer

Donald Frederick Robinson (1919 – January 9, 1997) was a Canadian politician who served as a member of the Legislative Assembly (MLA) of British Columbia from 1955 to 1966, representing the constituency of Lillooet as part of the Social Credit (Socred) caucus.

== Biography ==
Born in Calgary, Alberta, Robinson attended school in Swalwell before moving to Winnipeg, Manitoba, where he married his wife Anne; they had four children together. The family moved to British Columbia, where Robinson became a locomotive engineer and mechanic for the Pacific Great Eastern Railway. He contested the 1952 provincial election as a Social Credit candidate in the riding of Lillooet, but was defeated.

Liberal Gordon Gibson, Sr. was elected Lillooet MLA in 1953, then resigned in 1955 to trigger a by-election. He had alleged in the legislature that there had been fraudulent activities surrounding the award of forest management licences in the province (see Robert Sommers), and sought vindication from the electorate. Robinson secured the Socred nomination, then defeated Gibson in the September 1955 by-election to become MLA for Lillooet. He was re-elected in 1956, 1960 and 1963, but did not run again in the 1966 election, which saw the Lillooet riding dissolved and incorporated into the new district of Yale-Lillooet.

In his later years he returned to Calgary, where he died in 1997 at age 77.
