= Wilmer, British Columbia =

Settlement in British Columbia, Canada

Coordinates: 50.540°N 116.063°W

Wilmer is a small settlement near Invermere, British Columbia. The settlement was originally known as Peterborough and was founded in 1886. The explorer David Thompson founded a Northwest trading company post near the present-day site of Wilmer after crossing the Rockies via Howse Pass in 1807. Thompson spent a winter there while mapping the region. The site of the fort is now the National Historic Site Kootenae House.

The settlement, originally Peterborough, was changed in 1902 to honour Wilmer Wells, provincial minister of public works.

Wilmer is situated on the West benchland, 20 Kilometers north of Invermere BC, overlooking the Rocky Mountain Trench.
