= Andrew Thomas Jamieson =

Canadian politician

Andrew Thomas Jamieson (ca 1823 – October 31, 1872) was a politician in British Columbia. He represented Lillooet in the Legislative Assembly of British Columbia from 1871 to 1872.

Jamieson died in office in San Francisco, California at the age of 49.
