= William George Neilson =

Canadian Legislator

Member of the Legislative Assembly of British Columbia
- In office 1898–1899
- Succeeded by: Wilmer Cleveland Wells
- Constituency: East Kootenay North

Personal details
- Born: February 16, 1862 Lanark County, Canada West
- Died: January 6, 1899 (aged 36) Ramsay, Ontario
- Party: Independent
- Spouse: Jennie Anderson
- Occupation: lumberman

William George Neilson (February 16, 1862 – January 6, 1899) was a Canadian politician. He served in the Legislative Assembly of British Columbia from 1898 to 1899 from the electoral district of East Kootenay North. He died in office in 1899.
