= Archibald McDonald (Canadian politician) =

Canadian politician (1849–1933)

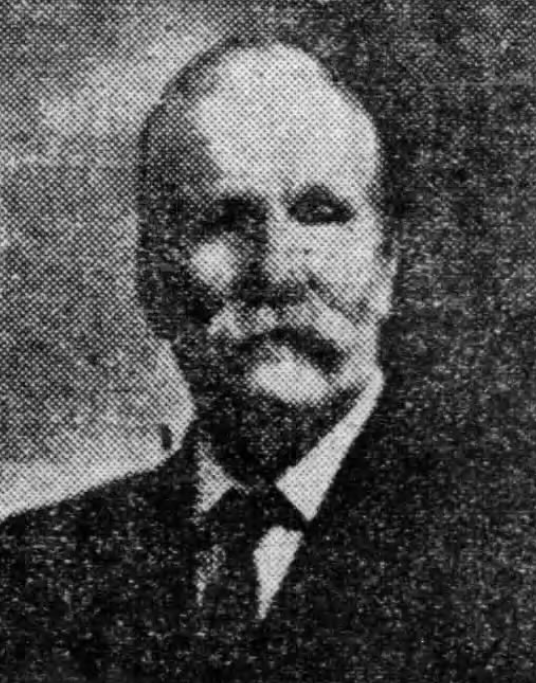

Member of the Legislative Assembly of British Columbia
- In office 1903–1907
- Preceded by: none
- Succeeded by: Mark Robert Eagleson
- Constituency: Lillooet
- In office 1909–1924
- Preceded by: Mark Robert Eagleson
- Succeeded by: Albert Edward Munn
- Constituency: Lillooet

Personal details
- Born: April 16, 1849 Ste-Anne-de-Prescott, Ontario
- Died: February 22, 1933 (aged 83) Vancouver, British Columbia
- Party: Conservative
- Spouse: Lillian MacMillan
- Occupation: Merchant

Archibald McDonald (April 16, 1849 – February 22, 1933) was a general merchant and political figure in British Columbia. He represented Lillooet in the Legislative Assembly of British Columbia from 1903 to 1907 and from 1909 to 1924 as a Conservative.

He was born at Ste-Anne-de-Prescott, Ontario in 1849, the son of Archibald McDonald and Catherine Cattanach, and educated at Carillon Academy near Hawkesbury. In 1887, McDonald married Lillian MacMillan. He was president of McDonald and McGillivray Ltd. in Clinton. His election in 1903 was declared void, but he defeated David Alexander Stoddart to win the subsequent by-election held in 1904. McDonald was defeated by Mark Robert Eagleson when he ran for reelection in 1907, then defeated Eagleson in 1909 and was reelected in 1912, 1916 and 1920. He did not seek re-election in the 1924 provincial election. He died on February 22, 1933.
