= East Kootenay (provincial electoral district) =

Defunct provincial electoral district in British Columbia, Canada

East Kootenay was a provincial electoral district in British Columbia, Canada, from 1890 to 1898. That riding's predecessor (and that of its onetime sibling, West Kootenay) was the original Kootenay riding, and its successors were East Kootenay South and East Kootenay North.

== Electoral History 1890–94 ==
East Kootenay existed as a riding name in the 1890 and 1894 general elections. Results for that riding are as follows:

7th British Columbia election, 1894
Party	Candidate	Votes	%	±	Expenditures
Government	James Baker	250	60.10%		unknown
Opposition	Nicolai Christian Schou	166	39.90%		unknown
Total valid votes		416	100.00%		
Total rejected ballots					
Turnout		%			

6th British Columbia election, 1890
Party	Candidate	Votes	%	±	Expenditures
Government	James Baker	145	50.70%		unknown
Opposition	Charles Law	141	49.30%		unknown
Total valid votes		286	100.00%		
Total rejected ballots					
Turnout		%			

== See also ==
- List of British Columbia provincial electoral districts
- Canadian provincial electoral districts
