= Alexander Edmund Batson Davie =

Premier of British Columbia from 1887 to 1889

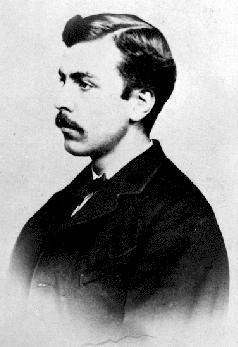
- Hon. Alexander Edmund Batson Davie

8th Premier of British Columbia
- In office April 1, 1887 – August 1, 1889
- Monarch: Victoria
- Lieutenant Governor: Hugh Nelson
- Preceded by: William Smithe
- Succeeded by: John Robson

MLA for Cariboo
- In office September 11, 1875 – May 22, 1878 Serving with George Anthony Walkem, John Evans
- Preceded by: Joseph Hunter
- Succeeded by: George Cowan

MLA for Lillooet
- In office July 24, 1882 – August 1, 1889 Serving with Edward Allen
- Preceded by: William Brown
- Succeeded by: Alfred Wellington Smith

Personal details
- Born: November 24, 1847; Somerset, England
- Died: August 1, 1889 (aged 41); Victoria, British Columbia
- Political party: None
- Spouse: Constance Langford Skinner (m. 1874)

Alexander Edmund Batson Davie, QC, referred to as A. E. B. Davie (November 24, 1847 – August 1, 1889), was the eighth premier of British Columbia. He served in office from 1887 until his death in 1889.

Called to the bar in 1873, he was the first person to receive his entire law education in British Columbia. Davie was first elected to the provincial legislature in 1875 from the riding of Cariboo as independent opposition candidate. He lost his seat in 1877 after a brief stint in the cabinet of Premier Andrew Charles Elliott, as provincial secretary. Davie returned to the legislature in 1882, this time from the riding of Lillooet, and became attorney-general under Premier William Smithe. He went to Ottawa and argued before the Supreme Court of Canada in favour of provincial rights pleading that the province had a right to regulate its liquor sales.

When Smithe died in 1887, the lieutenant-governor asked Davie to become premier but he fell ill within months and left for California to recuperate. In his absence, Provincial Secretary John Robson ran the government on a day-to-day basis, though Davie attempted to direct policy in his letters to Robson. He returned in May 1888, but his health was in a poor state, and he ultimately died in office the following August.

Davie Street in Vancouver is named for him. He was appointed a Queen's Counsel in September 1883. His brother, Theodore Davie, later became premier in 1892.

Davie was married December 3, 1874, to Constance Langford Skinner of Maple Bay, British Columbia. They had four children. Alexander Edmund Batson Davie is interred in the Ross Bay Cemetery in Victoria, British Columbia.
