= Lillooet (electoral district) =

Defunct provincial electoral district in British Columbia, Canada

Lillooet was a provincial electoral district in the Canadian province of British Columbia, centred on the town of the same name and with various boundaries. Originally with two members, the constituency was split into Lillooet West and Lillooet East in the 1894, 1898, and 1900 elections, with Lillooet West being recomprised as one riding (with only one member) in the 1903 election.

== Political geography ==
The riding was one of the first created in British Columbia, and at the time the town of Lillooet was one of the largest in the province (it is now one of the smallest). It was originally a two-member riding. It was an essentially rural riding, spanning the southern Cariboo and the mountain country west of Lillooet and the northern part of the Fraser Canyon. It was succeeded by the Yale-Lillooet riding, which has been succeeded by Fraser-Nicola.

== Members of the Legislative Assembly ==
- Thomas Basil Humphreys — 1871–1875
- Andrew Thomas Jamieson — 1871–1875
- William M. Brown — 1875–1882 (Reform slate and from 1878 Opposition)
- William Morrison — 1875–1878 (Reform slate)
- William Saul — 1878–1882 (Opposition and from 1886 Government)
- Edward Allen — 1882–1890 (Opposition and from 1886 Government)
- Alexander Edmund Batson Davie — 1882–1890 (ran as Opposition, but from 1887–1889 sat as Premier)
- Alfred Wellington Smith — 1890–1894 (Government)
- David Alexander Stoddart — 1890–1894 (Opposition)
- see Lillooet West and Lillooet East for elections in 1894, 1898, and 1900
- Archibald McDonald — 1903–1907 (Conservative)
- Mark Robert Eagleson — 1907–1909 (Liberal)
- Archibald McDonald — 1909–1924 (Conservative)
- Albert Edward Munn — 1924–1928 (Liberal)
- Ernest Crawford Carson — 1928–1933 (Conservative)
- George Matheson Murray — 1933–1941 (Liberal)
- Ernest Crawford Carson — 1941–1952 (Conservative)
- James Gordon Gibson 1953–1956 (Liberal)
- Donald Frederick Robinson — 1956–1966 (Social Credit)

== Election results ==
Note: Winners of each election are in bold.

1st British Columbia election, 1871
Party	Candidate	Votes	%	±	Expenditures
**Independent**	**Thomas Basil Humphreys^{1}**	**45**	**44.12%**		unknown
**Independent**	**Andrew Thomas Jamieson**	**36**	**35.29%**		unknown
Independent	William Saul	21	20.59%		unknown
Total valid votes		102	100.00%		
Total rejected ballots					
Turnout		79.69%			
^{1} Often spelled "Humphries" in many contemporary histories.

British Columbia byelection: Lillooet, November 27, 1871 ^{2}
Party	Candidate	Votes	%	±	Expenditures
Independent	William Chadwick	(2)^{3}	(6.06%)		unknown
Independent	Edward Kelly	(1)^{3}	(3.03%)		unknown
**Independent**	**William Saul**	**(30)^{3}**	**(90.91%)**		unknown
Total valid votes		(33)	(100.00%)		
Total rejected ballots					
Turnout		%			
^{2} To fill the seat-vacancy caused by the death of A.T. Jamieson 31 October 1872.
^{3} Incomplete returns. Numbers cited are from Cariboo Sentinel 28 December 1872.

British Columbia byelection: Lillooet, November 17, 1874 ^{4}
Party	Candidate	Votes	%	±	Expenditures
**Independent**	**William M. Brown**	**51**	**32.90%**		unknown
**Independent**	**Thomas Basil Humphreys**	**56**	**36.13%**		unknown
Independent	William Saul	48	30.97%		unknown
Total valid votes		155	100.00%		
Total rejected ballots					
Turnout		%			
^{4} Resignations 26 September 1874 of T.B. Humphreys and W. Saul over a "dispute between the two gentlemen as to which represents the popular feeling of the district" (Victoria Colonist, September 29, 1874).

1875 British Columbia general election
Party	Candidate	Votes	%	Elected
Reform caucus	William M. Brown	53	26.37	✓
Reform caucus	William Morrison	48	23.88	✓
Government	William Saul	46	22.88	
Reform caucus	John Martley ^{5}	33	16.42	
Reform caucus	George Dunne	21	10.45	
Total valid votes		201	100.00	
Turnout		85.90		
^{5} Captain Martley homesteaded at Pavilion around 1861/62. Ernest Crawford Carson and Robert Henry Carson, his neighbours, became MLAs and cabinet ministers in the 1930s in Lillooet and Kamloops respectively.

3rd British Columbia election, 1878
Party	Candidate	Votes	%	±	Expenditures
Opposition	**William M. Brown**	**78**	**32.37%**	–	unknown
Government	John Martley	39	16.18%	–	unknown
Government	William Morrison	47	19.50%	–	unknown
Opposition	**William Saul**	**48**	**23.88%**	–	unknown
Total valid votes		241	100.00%		
Total rejected ballots					
Turnout		78.01%			

4th British Columbia election, 1882
Party	Candidate	Votes	%	±	Expenditures
Opposition	**Edward Allen**	**55**	**23.21%**	–	unknown
Government	William M. Brown	28	11.81%	–	unknown
Opposition	**Alexander Edmund Batson Davie**	**69**	**29.11%**	–	unknown
Government	Charles Nelson McLellan	40	16.88%	–	unknown
Opposition	William Morrison	45	18.99%	–	unknown
Total valid votes		237	100.00%		
Total rejected ballots					
Turnout		63.37%			

British Columbia byelection: Lillooet, March 13, 1883 ^{2}
Party	Candidate	Votes	%	±	Expenditures
Government	**Alexander Edmund Batson Davie**	**Acclaimed**	-.- %	–	unknown
Total valid votes		n/a	-.- %		
Total rejected ballots					
Turnout		%			
^{2} Byelection caused by resignation of A.E.B. Davie upon his appointment to the Executive Council January 29, 1883. Date given is day of return of writs, as polling day was not necessary.

1886 British Columbia general election
Party	Candidate	Votes	%	Elected
Reform caucus	Alexander Edmund Batson Davie	93	30.10	✓
Reform caucus	William Allen	65	21.03	✓
Independent	William Morrison	57	18.45	
Opposition	William Saul	49	15.86	
Unknown	William Livingstone	45	14.56	
Total valid votes		309	100.00	
Turnout		77.25		

6th British Columbia election, 1890
Party	Candidate	Votes	%	±	Expenditures
Government	William Morrison	60	22.39%	–	unknown
Government	**Alfred Wellington Smith**	**89**	**33.21%**	–	unknown
Opposition	**David Alexander Stoddart**	**119**	**44.40%**	–	unknown
Total valid votes		268	100.00%		
Total rejected ballots					
Turnout		55.37%			

7th General Election 1894

split to two ridings:

- Lillooet East
- Lillooet West

8th General Election 1898

- Lillooet East
- Lillooet West

9th General Election 1900

- Lillooet East
- Lillooet West

10th British Columbia election, 1903
Party	Candidate	Votes	%	±	Expenditures
Conservative	Archibald McDonald	Accl.	--%		unknown
Total valid votes		--	--%		
Total rejected ballots					
Turnout		%			

11th British Columbia election, 1907
Party	Candidate	Votes	%	±	Expenditures
**Liberal**	**Mark Robert Eagleson**	**123**	**51.68%**		unknown
Conservative	Archibald McDonald	115	48.32%		unknown
Total valid votes		238	100.00%		
Total rejected ballots					
Turnout		60.10%			

12th British Columbia election, 1909
Party	Candidate	Votes	%	±	Expenditures
Liberal	Mark Robert Eagleson	117	41.20%		unknown
Conservative	**Archibald McDonald**	**167**	**58.80%**		unknown
Total valid votes		284	100.00%		
Total rejected ballots					
Turnout		79.11%			

13th British Columbia election, 1912
Party	Candidate	Votes	%	±	Expenditures
Liberal	Stuart Alexander Henderson	81	28.83%		unknown
Conservative	**Archibald McDonald**	**200**	**71.17%**		unknown
Total valid votes		281	100.00%		
Total rejected ballots					
Turnout		71.98%			

14th British Columbia election, 1916
Party	Candidate	Votes	%	±	Expenditures
Liberal	John Bates Bryson	269	47.61%		unknown
Conservative	**Archibald McDonald**	**296**	**52.39%**		unknown
Total valid votes		565	100.00%		
Total rejected ballots					
Turnout		66.27%			

1920 British Columbia general election
Party	Candidate	Votes	%
Conservative	Archibald McDonald	339	47.48
Liberal	John Bates Bryson	213	21.83
Soldier–Farmer	Ernest Crawford Carson ^{6}	162	22.69
Total valid votes		714	100.00
Turnout		76.94	
^{6} Brother of Robert Henry Carson, Liberal MLA for Kamloops. Both became cabinet ministers in their respective governments. Their father Robert Carson left Scotland at an early age, came west via the Oregon Trail came north for the Fraser Canyon Gold Rush, then wound up homesteading in 1863 on Pavilion Mountain in the wake of the gold rush, founding one of BC's earliest ranches.

16th British Columbia election, 1924
Party	Candidate	Votes	%	±	Expenditures
**Liberal**	**Albert Edward Munn**	**626**	**42.56%**		unknown
Provincial	Norman Joseph Paul	522	35.49%	–	unknown
Conservative	Archibald McDonald	323	21.96%		unknown
Total valid votes		1,471	100.00%		
Total rejected ballots					
Turnout		56.43%			

17th British Columbia election, 1928
Party	Candidate	Votes	%	±	Expenditures
Conservative	**Ernest Crawford Carson**	**1,237**	**54.61%**		unknown
Liberal	Albert Edward Munn	1,028	45.39%		unknown
Total valid votes		2,265	100.00%		
Total rejected ballots		56			
Turnout		80.28%			

18th British Columbia election, 1933
Party	Candidate	Votes	%	±	Expenditures
Non-Partisan Independent Group	Ernest Crawford Carson	705	33.51%	–	unknown
**Liberal**	**George Matheson Murray^{7}**	**927**	**44.06%**		unknown
Co-operative Commonwealth Fed.	John Morrison Smith	472	22.43%		unknown
Total valid votes		2,104	100.00%		
Total rejected ballots		96			
Turnout		66.29%			
^{7} Publisher of Bridge River-Lillooet News and husband of Margaret Lally "Ma" Murray.

19th British Columbia election, 1937
Party	Candidate	Votes	%	±	Expenditures
Co-operative Commonwealth Fed.	Robert Purvis Armstrong	855	28.92%		unknown
Conservative	Ernest Crawford Carson	925	31.29%		unknown
**Liberal**	**George Matheson Murray**	**1,176**	**39.78%**		unknown
Total valid votes		2956	100.00%		
Total rejected ballots		57			
Turnout		76.12%			

20th British Columbia election, 1941
Party	Candidate	Votes	%	±	Expenditures
Co-operative Commonwealth Fed.	Harry Grenfell Archibald	841	31.75%		unknown
Conservative	**Ernest Crawford Carson**	**1,017**	**38.39%**		unknown
Liberal	George Matheson Murray	791	29.86%		unknown
Total valid votes		2,649	100.00%		
Total rejected ballots		29			
Turnout		67.02%			

1945 British Columbia general election
Party	Candidate	Votes	%
Coalition	Ernest Crawford Carson	1,143	51.42
Social Credit Alliance	John Fossmark Jacobsen	296	8.82
Progressive Liberal	George Matheson Murray	61	2.74
Co-operative Commonwealth	Charles Radcliffe	823	37.02
Total valid votes		2,223	100.00
Total rejected ballots		21	
Turnout		63.19	

22nd British Columbia election, 1949
Party	Candidate	Votes	%	±	Expenditures
Coalition	**Ernest Crawford Carson**	**2,339**	**62.83%**	–	unknown
Social Credit Alliance	George Willis Lyons	1,180	31.69%	–	unknown
Independent	William Wallace O'Keefe	204	5.48%		unknown
Total valid votes		3,723	100.00%		
Total rejected ballots		125			
Turnout		77.94%			

23rd British Columbia election, 1952^{8}
Party	Candidate	Votes 1st count	%	Votes final count	%	±%	
**Progressive Conservative**	**Ernest Crawford Carson**	**1,301**	**35.68%**	**1,847**	**56.60%**		unknown
Co-operative Commonwealth Fed.	Gordon Hudson Dowding	1,074	29.46%	1,416	43.40%		unknown
Independent	James Coleman Finch	96	2.63%	-	-%		unknown
Liberal	William Henry Okell	725	19.88%	-	-%		unknown
Social Credit League	Donald Frederick Robinson	450	12.34%				
Total valid votes		3,646	%	3,263	100.00%		
Total rejected ballots		254					
Turnout		77.94%					
^{8} Preferential ballot; final count is between top two candidates from first count; intermediary counts (of 4) not shown

24th British Columbia election, 1953 ^{9}
Party	Candidate	Votes 1st count	%	Votes final count	%	±%	
Progressive Conservative	Herbert Ashby	452	11.32 %	-	-%		unknown
Co-operative Commonwealth Fed.	Gordon Hudson Dowding	1,372	34.37%	1,694	48.07%		unknown
**Liberal**	**Gordon Gibson, Sr.**	**1,103**	**27.63%**	**1,830**	**51.93%**		unknown
Social Credit	Frank Conrad Olafsen	1,065	26.68%				
Total valid votes		3,992	100.00%	3,524	%		
Total rejected ballots		170					
Total Registered Voters		5,933 (1952 list)					
Turnout		70.15%					
^{9} Preferential ballot; final count is between top two candidates from first count; intermediary counts (of 3) not shown

analysis of preferential ballot - preferential ballot - 1st, 2nd, 3rd choices, respectively:

- Ashby, Herbert PC 452 - -
- Gordon Hudson CCF 1,372 1,420 1,694
- GIBSON, James Gordon LIB. 1,103 1,335 1,830
- Olafson, Frank Conrad SC 1,065 1,138 -

British Columbia provincial by-election, September 12, 1955 Resignation of James Gordon Gibson
Party	Candidate	Votes	%
Social Credit	Donald Frederick Robinson	1,709	42.34
Liberal	James Gordon Gibson	1,282	31.76
Co-operative Commonwealth	Jack H. Thomas	844	20.91
Progressive Conservative	Bernard Cherry	201	4.98
Total valid votes		4,036	
Total rejected ballots		204	
Source: Elections BC

25th British Columbia election, 1956
Party	Candidate	Votes	%	±	Expenditures
Co-operative Commonwealth Fed.	Austin Kenneth Greenway	907	23.13		unknown
Social Credit	**Donald Frederick Robinson**	**2,055**	**52.41%**	–	unknown
Liberal	James Smith	959	24.46%		unknown
Total valid votes		3921	100.00%		
Total rejected ballots		58			
Turnout		72.97%			

26th British Columbia election, 1960
Party	Candidate	Votes	%	±	Expenditures
Progressive Conservative	George M. Behrner	336	7.84%		unknown
Liberal	Cyril Clyde Keyes	923	21.54%		unknown
Co-operative Commonwealth Fed.	John Kendrick Macey	1,331	31.06%		unknown
Social Credit	**Donald Frederick Robinson**	**1,695**	**39.56%**	–	unknown
Total valid votes		4,285	100.00%		
Total rejected ballots		282			
Turnout		66.77%			

27th British Columbia election, 1963
Party	Candidate	Votes	%	±	Expenditures
Liberal	Henry Greer Castillou	977	23.15%		unknown
Progressive Conservative	Thomas William Meagher	702	16.64%		unknown
Social Credit	**Donald Frederick Robinson**	**1,425**	**33.77%**	–	unknown
New Democratic	Clare Skatfeld	1331	31.06%		unknown
Total valid votes		4,220	100.00%		
Total rejected ballots		53			
Turnout		65.33%			

In the 28th General Election in 1966, parts of the former riding of Lillooet became incorporated into the new riding of Yale-Lillooet, which has since been replaced by Fraser-Nicola

== See also ==
- List of British Columbia provincial electoral districts
- Canadian provincial electoral districts
