= George Thomson (Canadian politician) =

Canadian politician

George Thomson (February 8, 1855 – July 9, 1920) was a Scottish-born merchant, official and political figure in British Columbia. He represented Nanaimo in the Legislative Assembly of British Columbia from 1887 to 1890.

He was born in Ayr, the son of David Thomson and Catherine Smith, and was educated there. He learned the grocery trade and came to Nanaimo in 1873. Thomson was employed by the firm of Harvey and Dunsmuir for ten years. He then went into business on his own as a general merchant. He sold that business and was manager for A. R. Johnson and Company for six years. Thomson was assistant to Government Agent Marshal Bray at Nanaimo for nine years and then was named government agent at Ladysmith. He also served as assessor and collector, stipendiary magistrate, gold commissioner and registrar of births, deaths and marriages. In 1877, Thomson married Sabra Gough. After being defeated in the 1886 provincial election, he was elected to the assembly in an 1887 by-election held following the death of William Raybould. He did not seek a second term in office in the 1890 provincial election. Thomson died in Vancouver at the age of 65.
