= James Mitchell Mutter =

Canadian politician

James Mitchell Mutter (April 8, 1845 – May 31, 1920) was a Scottish-born soldier, farmer and political figure in British Columbia, Canada. He represented Cowichan-Alberni in the Legislative Assembly of British Columbia from 1894 until his retirement at the 1898 provincial election. He never again sought a seat in the Legislature.

He was born at Keppoch Hill near Glasgow, the son of James Mutter, and educated at Islay, the Irvine Royal Academy and by private tuition. In 1873, he married Isabella Morrison. Mutter had been a major in the Argyll and Bute Artillery, a justice of the peace and commissioner of supply for Argyllshire. He later settled in Somenos, British Columbia. Mutter was president of the Cowichan and Salt Spring Island Agricultural Association. He died in Somenos at the age of 75.
