= Ithiel Nason =

Canadian politician

MLA for Cariboo
- In office January 26, 1891 – May 27, 1893
- Preceded by: Robert McLeese
- Succeeded by: Joseph Mason
- In office January 31, 1889 – May 10, 1890
- Preceded by: Joseph Mason
- Succeeded by: William Adams

Personal details
- Born: Ithiel Blake Nason; August 10, 1839 Maine, United States
- Died: May 27, 1893 (aged 53) Victoria, British Columbia
- Party: none

Ithiel Blake Nason (August 10, 1839 – May 27, 1893) was an American-born businessman and political figure in British Columbia. He represented Cariboo in the Legislative Assembly of British Columbia from 1889 to 1890 and from 1891 until his death in 1893.

He was born in Maine and came to Antler Creek in 1861, constructing a number of sawmills in the area. Nason married Mary Watson in 1877. He lived in Richfield. He was elected to the Legislature in an 1888 byelection held after Robert McLeese resigned his seat to run for a seat in the Canadian House of Commons. He did not seek a second term in the 1890 provincial election but he was a successful candidate in an 1891 provincial byelection. Nason died in office in Victoria at the age of 53.
