= George Albert Huff =

Canadian politician

George Albert Huff (ca 1849 – September 20, 1934) was a merchant and political figure in British Columbia. He represented Cowichan-Alberni in the Legislative Assembly of British Columbia from 1895 to 1898.

He was born in Prince Edward County, Ontario and educated in Brighton. Huff married Eliza Ann Gillies at Port Dover. He served as a justice of the peace. Huff was elected to the assembly in an 1895 by-election held after the by-election held earlier that year, in which he was also a candidate, was declared invalid. He was defeated in the 1898 provincial election and did not run again for provincial office. He died in Alberni at the age of 85.
