= William Wymond Walkem =

Canadian politician

William Wymond Walkem (June 25, 1850 – September 23, 1919) was a physician, author and political figure in British Columbia, Canada. He represented South Nanaimo in the Legislative Assembly of British Columbia from 1894 to 1898.

He was born in Montreal, the son of Charles Walkem, and was educated at McGill University, graduating in 1873. While a student, he worked as a reporter for Montreal newspapers. After graduating, Walkem went to Britain and tried unsuccessfully to join Carlist supporters fighting in Spain. He then returned to Canada as a private secretary to his brother, George Anthony. Walkem was editor of the Victoria Daily Standard for a time. He served as inspector for British Columbia Penitentiary and was a coroner for the province from 1878 to 1895. Walkem was married twice: to Edith Moyle in 1875 and later to Minnie Brown.

He ran unsuccessfully for a seat in the assembly in 1890. He was elected to represent the South Nanaimo district in 1894. Walkem was defeated by Ralph Smith when he ran for reelection in 1898. He never sought provincial office again.

Walkem wrote Stories of early British Columbia, published in 1914.
