= East Kootenay North =

Defunct provincial electoral district in British Columbia, Canada

East Kootenay North was an electoral district in the Canadian province of British Columbia in the 1898 and 1900 elections only. Its official name was East Kootenay (North Riding). It was created by a partition of the old East Kootenay riding which also created its sibling, East Kootenay (south riding). Successor ridings in the East Kootenay region were Fernie, Cranbrook and Columbia.

== Election results ==
Election winners are in bold.

8th British Columbia election, 1898
Party	Candidate	Votes	%	±	Expenditures
Government	**William George Neilson**	**169**	**53.31%**	–	unknown
Opposition	Wilmer Cleveland Wells	148	46.69%	–	unknown
Total valid votes		317	100.00%		
Total rejected ballots					
Turnout		55.37%			

1900 British Columbia general election
Party	Candidate	Votes	%
Independent Progressive	Wilmer Cleveland Wells	246	56.55
Conservative	Francis Patrick Armstrong	111	25.52
Government	Frank Burnett	78	17.93
Total valid votes		435	100.00
Turnout		55.37	

== See also ==
- List of British Columbia provincial electoral districts
- Canadian provincial electoral districts
- Kootenay (electoral districts)
