= Adam Swart Vedder =

Canadian politician

Member of the Legislative Assembly of British Columbia for Westminster-Chilliwhack
- In office May 7, 1897 – 1898
- Preceded by: Thomas Edwin Kitchen
- Succeeded by: Charles William Munro

Personal details
- Born: July 27, 1834 Schenectady, New York, U.S.
- Died: October 8, 1905 (aged 71) Chilliwack, British Columbia, Canada
- Party: Independent
- Spouses: Althea Dicker (m. 1877); Elizabeth Jackman (m. 1894)
- Parents: Volkert Vedder; Agnes Swart
- Occupation: Rancher

Adam Swart Vedder (July 27, 1834 – October 8, 1905) was a rancher and political figure in British Columbia. He represented Westminster-Chilliwhack in the Legislative Assembly of British Columbia from 1897 to 1898.

He was born in Schenectady, New York, the son of Volkert Vedder and Agnes Swart, of Dutch descent, and was educated there. In 1846, he moved to Chicago and then, in 1852, moved to Sacramento, California where he worked at transporting supplies to the mines. In 1860, he moved to British Columbia, where he was again involved in transporting goods. In 1868, he began ranching near Sumas. Vedder was married twice: first to Althea Dicker in 1877 and then to Elizabeth Jackman in 1894. He served on the municipal council and was also warden for Chilliwack township. Vedder served as postmaster from 1888 to 1894. He was elected to the assembly in an 1897 by-election held following the death of Thomas Edwin Kitchen. He did not seek a second term in office in the 1898 provincial election. Vedder died in Chilliwack at the age of 71.

His first wife is said to have chosen the name for the town of Sardis at random from her Bible.
