= James Tolmie (Canadian politician) =

Canadian politician

James Tolmie (September 9, 1855 – December 7, 1917) was a farmer and political figure in British Columbia. He represented Victoria in the Legislative Assembly of British Columbia from 1888 to 1890.

He was born in Fort Nisqually, the son of William Fraser Tolmie and Jane Work, and was educated in Victoria. Tolmie entered business for five years after completing his education and then began the study of law. After one year, he abandoned his studies and instead went on to manage the family farm at Coverdale in Saanich. He was elected to the assembly in an 1888 by-election held after Robert Franklin John accepted a position as warden of the jail at Victoria. He did not seek a second term in office in the 1890 provincial election. Tolmie died in Saanich at the age of 62.

His younger brother Simon Fraser Tolmie served as Premier of British Columbia.
