= Thomas Cunningham (Canadian politician) =

Canadian politician

Thomas Cunningham (April 12, 1837 – February 16, 1916) was an Irish-born merchant, farmer and political figure in British Columbia. He represented New Westminster City in the Legislative Assembly of British Columbia from an 1889 byelection until his defeat in the 1890 provincial election.

He was born in Ulster and was educated there. In 1853, he came to Kingston, Province of Canada. In 1859, Cunningham travelled to Victoria, Colony of Vancouver Island, following the discovery of gold in the province. The following spring, he travelled to Antler Creek in the Cariboo, Colony of British Columbia. In 1861, he moved to New Westminster, where he sold stoves and hardware. In 1864, he took over the Vancouver Coal Co. in Nanaimo. In 1867, Cunningham was elected to the assembly for Vancouver Island and voted for the union of the two colonies. From 1867 to 1882, he lived in Salem, Oregon, where he was a merchant and manufacturer of wagons, carriages and agricultural implements. Cunningham then returned to New Westminster, again employed as a hardware merchant. He later became involved in fruit growing and raising Jersey cattle. Cunningham served on the New Westminster municipal council and was president of the British Columbia Agricultural Society. He was elected to the provincial assembly in an 1889 by-election held after William Norman Bole was named a judge. Cunningham married Emily Woodman in 1864. In 1900, he was named provincial horticulturist. In 1906, he was British Columbia's first inspector of fruits. Cunningham died in Vancouver at the age of 70.

His wife's twin sister Mary Ann married his brother James, who served in the provincial assembly and the Canadian House of Commons.

Cunningham Island, north of Bella Bella, was named in his honour.
