= James Morris Martin =

Canadian politician

MLA for West Kootenay-Rossland
- In office 1898–1900

Personal details
- Born: January 8, 1845 Renfrew County, Canada West
- Died: June 16, 1902 (aged 57) Rossland, British Columbia
- Party: Opposition

James Morris Martin (January 8, 1845 – June 16, 1902) was a Canadian politician. He served in the Legislative Assembly of British Columbia from 1898 to 1900 from the electoral district of West Kootenay-Rossland. He did not seek a second term in the Legislature in the 1900 provincial election. He was a hardware merchant and two-term mayor of Vernon, British Columbia.
