= Westminster-Richmond =

Defunct provincial electoral district in British Columbia, Canada

Westminster-Richmond was a provincial electoral district of British Columbia, Canada, from 1894 to 1900. It and its sister ridings (Westminster-Delta, Westminster-Dewdney, and Westminster-Chilliwhack) were successors to the old four-member Westminster riding, which appeared in 1890 only and was a subdivision of the older New Westminster (provincial electoral district) riding. Westminster-Richmond was succeeded by the Richmond riding in the election of 1903.

== Electoral history ==
Note: winners of each election are in bold.

6th British Columbia election, 1894
Party	Candidate	Votes	%	±	Expenditures
Government	Charles Stanford Douglas	290	44.07%	–	unknown
Opposition	**Thomas Kidd**	**368**	**55.93%**	–	unknown
Total valid votes		658	100.00%		
Total rejected ballots					
Turnout		%			

7th British Columbia election, 1898
Party	Candidate	Votes	%	±	Expenditures
Opposition	**Thomas Kidd**	**357**	**67.36%**	–	unknown
Government	James McQueen	173	32.64%	–	
Total valid votes		530	100.00%		
Total rejected ballots					
Turnout		%			

8th British Columbia election, 1900
Party	Candidate	Votes	%	±	Expenditures
Progressive	**Thomas Kidd**	**222**	**39.71%**		unknown
Opposition	Duncan Rowan	204	36.49	–	unknown
Total valid votes		559	100.00%		
Total rejected ballots					
Turnout		%			

== See also ==
- List of British Columbia provincial electoral districts
- Canadian provincial electoral districts
