= William Brown (British Columbia politician) =

Canadian politician (1838–1915)

William M. Brown (March 6, 1838 – 23 December 1915) was an English-born political figure in British Columbia. He represented Lillooet in the Legislative Assembly of British Columbia from 1874 to 1882. He was an unsuccessful candidate in the 1882, 1886, 1890, and 1894 provincial elections.

He was born in Yorkshire and came to Wisconsin in 1842, where he was educated. In 1862, Brown moved to British Columbia. He was first elected to the assembly in an 1874 by-election held after William Saul and Thomas Basil Humphreys both resigned their seats in a "dispute between the two gentlemen as to which represents the popular feeling of the district". Brown lived in Clinton.
