= Anthony Maitland Stenhouse =

Canadian politician

Anthony Maitland Stenhouse (February 21, 1849 – 1927) was a Scottish-born political figure in British Columbia. He represented Comox in the Legislative Assembly of British Columbia from 1886 to 1887.

He was born in Edinburgh, the son of Robert Talbot Stenhouse, was educated privately and then attended the University of Edinburgh but failed to qualify for the medical school there. In 1884, he travelled to New York City, continuing on to Vancouver by way of Puget Sound. He settled in the Comox Valley in October 1884, acquiring farmland there. During 1887, Stenhouse joined the Church of Jesus Christ of Latter-day Saints and submitted his resignation from his seat in the assembly in October of that year. He campaigned on behalf of Thomas Basil Humphreys, who replaced him in the assembly. He originally planned to settle in Utah Territory but, in 1888, announced his intent to join a Mormon settlement in the Northwest Territories (present-day southern Alberta) led by Charles Ora Card. Although Stenhouse remained a bachelor, he vigorously defended the right of Mormons to practise polygamy. This in fact led to federal legislation being introduced by Sir John Thompson which declared polygamy to be illegal in Canada. In June 1891, Stenhouse returned to Britain, apparently abandoning the Mormon faith.
