= Gordon Gibson Sr. =

Canadian politician

James Gordon Gibson (November 28, 1904 – July 17, 1986), often referred to as Gordon Gibson Sr., was a Canadian business leader and politician based in British Columbia. He represented Lillooet from 1953 until his defeat in a byelection in 1955 and North Vancouver from 1960 to 1966 in the Legislative Assembly of British Columbia as a Liberal.

Gibson was a millionaire timber baron whose nickname was "Bull of the Woods" due to his loud lumberjack's voice. He was dismissed as a rough, hard-drinking logger who had made it rich, but was loved by many small loggers as being one of the few people to be interested in them over the interests of big business.

== Biography ==
Gibson was born at Gold Bottom Creek near Dawson City, Yukon. His father was working a small mining claim while his mother was the camp cook. The claim failed and according to Gordon, he and his brother Clarke were taken out of the Yukon in an orange crate. In the 1920s, he and his brothers ran the Gibson Lumber and Shingle Company. During the Depression, they were active around Vancouver Island, Vancouver and Seattle. The Gibson brothers built a $4,000,000 sawmill business starting at Nootka Sound on the west coast of Vancouver Island.

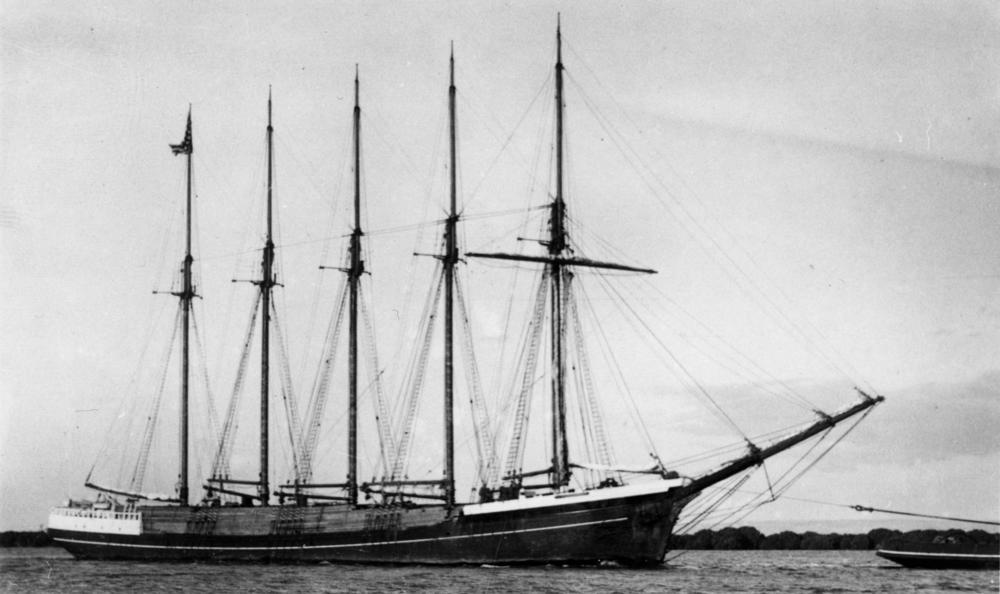
Schooner K.V. Kruse, built in 1920 by Kruse and Banks in North Bend, Oregon

They had more than 40 boats working the Inside Passage including the five masted 2,000 ton bald headed schooner, the Malahat, and the five-masted schooner K.V. Kruse. The Gibson family also owned a radio station in North Vancouver and a whaling station at Coal Harbour. Gibson ended up with a 132-foot pleasure boat called the Norsal which he renamed the Maui Lu (after his first wife, Louise) and sailed it to his resort on Maui. At his resort, Gibson had a totem pole which he had arranged to fly out from Nootka Sound to Maui. At its base was an inscription written in concrete that claimed that it was the first totem pole to fly the Pacific. Gordon took his grandson Mark on the voyage from Vancouver to Maui to give him an experience where the eleven day cruise was full of excitement and adventure. Pete Lovick and Alistair Mellander came along who looked after the engines that almost failed and looked after the course to get the Maui Lui to Hawaii. Everyone learned from Gordon's stories from the Roberts Summers issue and the love Gordon had for British Columbia, He was a great Canadian and loved his country.

== Political career ==
He was one of four MLAs who managed to get elected in the June 9, 1953 election when the Liberals received 23% of the vote. In the Lillooet riding, Gibson received 27.63% on the first count (in a preferential ballot) but on the third and final count edged out CCF rival Gordon Dowding with 51.93%.

In 1967, Gibson was appointed a member of the Northwest Territories Council.

== Family ==
In 1971, he married Ms. Gertrude Schneider and together they ran a hotel on Maui with a restaurant that was very popular.

Gordon Gibson died of lung cancer in 1986.

His son, Gordon Gibson Jr. led the provincial Liberals in the 1970s and carried on to become a prominent political commentator. His daughter, Louanne, raised her family in California and Guatemala before returning to B.C.
