= South Nanaimo =

Defunct provincial electoral district in British Columbia, Canada

South Nanaimo was a provincial electoral district of British Columbia, Canada, in the 1894, 1898, and 1900 elections only.

== Election results ==
Note: Winners of each election are in bold.

7th British Columbia election, 1894
Party	Candidate	Votes	%	±	Expenditures
Labour	Tully Boyce^{1}	120	45.11%		unknown
Government	**William Wymond Walkem**	**146**	**54.89%**	–	unknown
Total valid votes		266	100.00%		
Total rejected ballots					
Turnout		%			
^{1} Nominated by the Nanaimo Reform Club, which had been set up by the Opposition but was dominated by the Miners' and Mine-Labourers' Protective Association (MMLPA). The slate was described as "a labor ticket on a labor platform, but with outside support." (T.R. Loosmore, "The British Columbia Labor Movement and Political Action, 1878-1906", 1954, p. 67(2).)

8th British Columbia election, 1898
Party	Candidate	Votes	%	±	Expenditures
**Labour**	**Ralph Smith^{2}**	**193**	**78.46%**		unknown
Government	William Wymond Walkem	53	21.54%	–	unknown
Total valid votes		246	100.00%		
Total rejected ballots					
Turnout		%			
^{2} Ran as a "Labour-Oppositionist, i.e. as a Labour candidate but with Opposition support (T.R. Loosmore, "The British Columbia Labour Movement and Political Action in British Columbia, 1879-1906", 1954, p. 92).

9th British Columbia election, 1900
Party	Candidate	Votes	%	±	Expenditures
Opposition	**James Dunsmuir**	**249**	**52.53%**	–	unknown
Labour	John Radcliffe^{3}	225	47.47%		unknown
Total valid votes		474	100.00%		
Total rejected ballots					
Turnout		%			
^{3} N(I)LP candidate supported by Provincial Party. (See note 6.) His name was also spelled Ratcliff and Ratcliffe by the press.

The riding was redistributed before the 1903 election. Successor ridings were (roughly) Nanaimo City, Newcastle, and The Islands.

== See also ==
- List of British Columbia provincial electoral districts
- Canadian provincial electoral districts
- List of electoral districts in Greater Nanaimo

Legislative Assembly of British Columbia
Preceded by Vancouver City	Constituency represented by the Premier of British Columbia; 1900–1902	Succeeded by Victoria City
