= North Victoria =

North Victoria was a provincial electoral district in British Columbia, Canada. It was created from a partition of the old Victoria riding, one of the province's first twelve, and first appeared on the hustings in 1894 as part of a redistribution of the old Victoria riding, along with South Victoria. For other Victoria-area ridings please see List of electoral districts in Greater Victoria.

== Electoral history ==
Note: winners of each election are in bold.

7th British Columbia election, 1894
Party	Candidate	Votes	%	±	Expenditures
Government	**John Paton Booth**	**136**	**56.90%**	–	unknown
Opposition	Horatio John Robertson	103	43.10%	–	unknown
Total valid votes		239	100.00%		
Total rejected ballots					
Turnout		%			

8th British Columbia election, 1898
Party	Candidate	Votes	%	±	Expenditures
Government	**John Paton Booth**	**144**	**52.75%**	–	unknown
Opposition	Thomas Wilson Paterson	129	47.25%	–	unknown
Total valid votes		273	100.00%		
Total rejected ballots					
Turnout		%			

1900 British Columbia general election
Party	Candidate	Votes	%
Independent Liberal	John Paton Booth	123	43.77
Independent Government	James Johnstone White	117	41.64
Independent Opposition	Horatio John Robertson	41	14.59
Total valid votes		281	100.00

The North Victoria riding-name disappeared in the 1903 election. Its main successor-riding was Saanich.

== Sources ==
Elections BC Historical Returns
