= William Russell Robertson =

Canadian politician

Member of the Legislative Assembly for Cowichan
- In office December 28, 1898 – June 9, 1900
- In office July 9, 1898 – November 30, 1898

Personal details
- Born: June 17, 1853 Morrisburg, Canada West
- Died: November 7, 1930 (aged 77) Duncan, British Columbia
- Party: Government

William Russell Robertson (June 17, 1853 – November 7, 1930) was a Canadian politician. He served in the Legislative Assembly of British Columbia from July to November 1898 and then from December 1898 until his retirement at the 1900 provincial election, from the electoral district of Cowichan.
