= Robert Macpherson (Canadian politician) =

Canadian politician

Robert Macpherson (December 11, 1853 – June 30, 1929) was a Scottish-born carpenter, builder and political figure in British Columbia. He represented Vancouver City in the Legislative Assembly of British Columbia from 1894 to 1900.

He was born in Inverkip, Renfrewshire, Scotland, the son of Ritchie Macpherson, and was educated there. Macpherson came to Manitoba in 1882 and then moved to Vancouver in 1888. In 1894, he married Jane Elizabeth Sinclair (1863–1955).

Macpherson was nominated by the Nationalist Party, known as British Columbia's "first real labor party". (Its name was derived from its emphasis on nationalization and public ownership.) He was elected in 1894 and 1898, to represent Vancouver City.

He was defeated when he ran for reelection in 1900 and then again in a 1901 byelection.

Macpherson died in 1929 and is interred in Burnaby, British Columbia.
