= Edward Allen (Canadian politician) =

Canadian politician (died 1890)

Edward Allen (c. 1829 – March 31, 1890) was an English-born farmer and political figure in British Columbia. He represented Lillooet in the Legislative Assembly of British Columbia from 1882 to 1890.

He was born in Nottingham and was self-educated. Allen married the only daughter of George Poyzer in 1848 in England. In 1867, he settled on land next to a roadhouse owned by William H. Kay that was located on the Cariboo Wagon Road. One day, believing that part of the roadhouse was located on his property, Allen began chopping down the building with an axe. When Kay attempted to stop Allen, he was nearly killed. Allen was sentenced to a year in the New Westminster penitentiary. He served as Assessor and Collector for Lillooet District from 1876 to 1879. Allen died in office in Victoria at the age of 61.
