= William Adams (British Columbia politician) =

Canadian politician (1851–1936)

MLA for Cariboo
- In office January 18, 1894 – June 7, 1898

Personal details
- Born: March 12, 1851 Dumfries Township, Canada West
- Died: July 1, 1936 (aged 85) Chilliwack, British Columbia
- Spouse(s): Sophia Catherine Peterson (m. 1918–1932; his death)

William Adams (March 12, 1851 – July 1, 1936) was a farmer and political figure in British Columbia. He represented Cariboo in the Legislative Assembly of British Columbia from January 1894 to June 1898. He retired and did not seek a third term in the Legislature in the 1898 provincial election. Adams was not a member of a political party during his tenure as MLA, rather he was a member of the Davie and Turner government factions. He was unsuccessful when he tried to return to the Legislature in the 1903 provincial election, running in the Cariboo riding as a Conservative.

He was born in Dumfries Township, Canada West, the son of Scottish immigrants, and was educated there. In 1883, Adams married Charlotte McDonald. Adams was first elected to the assembly in an 1893 by-election held following the death of Ithiel Nason. He lived at Lightning Creek. Adams raised livestock. He owned Springfield Ranch, later selling it to his daughter and son-in-law. He died in Chilliwack in 1936.
