= South Victoria (electoral district) =

South Victoria was a provincial electoral district in the Canadian province of British Columbia. It first appeared on the hustings in 1894 as part of a redistribution of the old Victoria riding, along with North Victoria. For other Victoria-area ridings please see List of electoral districts in Greater Victoria.

== Electoral history ==
Note: winners of each election are in bold.

7th British Columbia election, 1894
Party	Candidate	Votes	%	±	Expenditures
Government	Joseph Westrop Carey	100	26.74%	–	unknown
Government	**David McEwen Eberts**	**274**	**73.26%**	–	unknown
Total valid votes		374	100.00%		
Total rejected ballots					
Turnout		%			

8th British Columbia election, 1898
Party	Candidate	Votes	%	±	Expenditures
Government	**David McEwen Eberts**	**236**	**52.91%**	–	unknown
Opposition	James Stuart Yates	210	47.09%	–	unknown
Total valid votes		446	100.00%		
Total rejected ballots					
Turnout		%			

1900 British Columbia general election
Party	Candidate	Votes	%
Opposition	David McEwen Eberts	236	52.91
Government-Independent	George Sangster	208	44.54
Total valid votes		467	100.00

The South Victoria riding was succeeded in the 1903 election by Oak Bay.

== Sources ==
Elections BC Historical Returns
