= Lillooet West (electoral district) =

Defunct provincial electoral district in British Columbia, Canada

Lillooet West was a provincial electoral district in the Canadian province of British Columbia. It was created from the division of the former two-member Lillooet into Lillooet East and Lillooet West, and appeared only in the 1894, 1898, and 1900 elections. For the 1903 election Lillooet East was redistributed into Kamloops and Cariboo-area ridings and Lillooet West was given the old Lillooet name, with both as one-member ridings.

== Electoral history ==
7th British Columbia election, 1894
Party	Candidate	Votes	%	±	Expenditures	
Opposition	William H. Keatley	36	37.11%	–	unknown	
Government	Alfred Wellington Smith (elected)	61	62.89%	–	unknown	
Total valid votes		97	100.00%			
Total rejected ballots						
The election was voided due to voting irregularities but Prentice sat for the first session.						%

8th British Columbia election, 1898
Party	Candidate	Votes	%	±	Expenditures
Opposition	Eusebius S. Peters	72	36.06%	–	unknown
Government	Alfred Wellington Smith (elected)	133	63.94%	–	unknown
Total valid votes		205	100.00%		
Total rejected ballots					
Turnout		%			

9th British Columbia election, 1900
Party	Candidate	Votes	%	±	Expenditures
Government	Alexander Lachore	7	3.17%	–	unknown
Independent	Robert B. Skinner	80	36.20%		unknown
Government	Alfred Wellington Smith (elected)	134	60.63%	–	unknown
Total valid votes		221	100.00%		
Total rejected ballots					
Turnout		%			

== See also ==
- List of British Columbia provincial electoral districts
- Canadian provincial electoral districts
