= Wilmer Cleveland Wells =

Canadian politician

- Born: November 4, 1839; Upper Canada
- Died: October 19, 1933 (aged 93); Vancouver, British Columbia, Canada
- Occupations: Rancher, lumberman
- Parents: James Wells; Bella Higginson

Wilmer Cleveland Wells (4 November 1839 – October 19, 1933) was a Canadian rancher, lumberman and political figure in British Columbia. He represented East Kootenay North from 1899 to 1903 and Columbia from 1903 to 1907 as a Liberal in the Legislative Assembly of British Columbia.

After being an unsuccessful candidate in the 1898 provincial election, Wells was first elected to the assembly in an 1899 by-election held following the death of William George Nielson. He was named to the provincial cabinet in 1900 as Commissioner of Lands and Works but was dropped from cabinet in 1903 because it was alleged by the opposition that he was an agent of the Canadian Pacific Railway. Wells was defeated when he ran for reelection in 1907. In 1907, he bought the Hume Hotel in Nelson from John Frederick Hume. Wells died in Vancouver at the age of 93.

The settlement of Wilmer was named after him.
