= David Alexander Stoddart =

Canadian politician

David Alexander Stoddart (September 6, 1857 – October 12, 1942) was a businessman and political figure in British Columbia. He represented Lillooet from 1890 to 1894, Lillooet East from 1895 to 1898 and Cariboo from 1924 to 1928 in the Legislative Assembly of British Columbia.

He was born in Owen Sound, Canada West, the son of Robert Stoddart, a native of Scotland. He lived in Clinton. Stoddart came to the Cariboo region in 1882 during the construction of the Canadian Pacific Railway. He ran a store in Clinton and also later for a time operated the 83 Mile House, first built as a stagecoach stop on the Cariboo Road. He ran unsuccessfully as a Liberal against Archibald McDonald in a 1904 by-election held in Lillooet. Stoddart was elected to the assembly in 1924 for Cariboo as a member of the Provincial Party; he was defeated when he ran for reelection in 1928 as an independent. He was also an unsuccessful candidate in the 1894 and 1898 general elections. He died in Vancouver at the age of 85.
