= James Douglas Prentice =

Canadian politician

James Douglas Prentice (February 3, 1861 – October 26, 1911) was a Scottish-born rancher and political figure in British Columbia. He represented Lillooet East in the Legislative Assembly of British Columbia in 1894 and from 1898 to 1903.

== Early life ==
Born in Lanarkshire in 1861 and educated in Edinburgh, Prentice emigrated to Canada around 1888. He was employed for a time by the Canadian Bank of Commerce, but then settled in the Lillooet area where he became a rancher.

Prentice became a local representative for the Western Canadian Ranching Company, working as a partner with Thomas Galpin (1828-1910), a retired publisher in England who was a co-founder of the Cassell publishing house. The partnership was further cemented when Prentice also became Galpin's son-in-law.

== Politics ==
In 1894, Prentice stood for election to Legislative Assembly of British Columbia: he was successful but the result was overturned after an appeal and Prentice lost the subsequent by-election to David Alexander Stoddart. He was, however, successfully returned in 1898, 1900, and a 1900 provincial byelection. He did not seek a fifth term in the Legislature in the 1903 provincial election.

The Hon. J. D. Prentice served in the provincial cabinet as Minister of Education (1900 to 1901 and in an acting role later in 1901 to 1902), Minister of Finance and Agriculture (1901 to 1903), and Provincial Secretary (1900 to 1901 and in an acting role later in 1901 to 1902).

== Family ==
Prentice married Mabel Clare Galpin, one of the nine daughters (and two sons) of Thomas Galpin. Their son, also called James Douglas Prentice had a distinguished career in the Royal Canadian Navy.

Jim Prentice died in Lillooet in 1911, at the age of 50.
