= Lillooet East (electoral district) =

Defunct provincial electoral district in British Columbia, Canada

Lillooet East was a provincial electoral district in the Canadian province of British Columbia. It was created from the division of the former two-member Lillooet into Lillooet East and Lillooet West, and appeared only in the 1894, 1898, and 1900 elections. For the 1903 election Lillooet East was redistributed into Kamloops and Cariboo-area ridings and Lillooet West was given the old Lillooet name, with both as one-member ridings.

== Electoral history ==
7th British Columbia election, 1894
| Party | Candidate | Votes | % | ± | Expenditures | |
|---|---|---|---|---|---|---|
| Opposition | James Douglas Prentice (elected) | 83 | 50.30% | – | unknown | |
| Government | David Alexander Stoddart (elected) | 82 | 49.70% | – | unknown | |
| Total valid votes | | 165 | 100.00% | | | |
| Total rejected ballots | | | | | | |
| The election was voided due to voting irregularities but Prentice sat for the first session. | | | | | | % |

8th British Columbia election, 1898
| Party | Candidate | Votes | % | ± | Expenditures |
|---|---|---|---|---|---|
| Opposition | James Douglas Prentice (elected) | 125 | 54.11% | – | unknown |
| Government | David Alexander Stoddart | 106 | 45.89% | – | unknown |
| Total valid votes | | 231 | 100.00% | | |
| Total rejected ballots | | | | | |
| Turnout | | % | | | |

1900 British Columbia general election
| Party | Candidate | Votes | % |
|---|---|---|---|
| Government | Robert Thomas Graham | 43 | 20.77% |
| Opposition/Progressive | James Douglas Prentice (elected) | 164 | 79.23% |
| Total valid votes | | 207 | |

== See also ==
- List of British Columbia provincial electoral districts
- Canadian provincial electoral districts
