= Thomas Kidd (British Columbia politician) =

Canadian politician

MLA for Westminster-Richmond
- In office 1894–1903

Personal details
- Born: February 23, 1846 County Down, Ireland
- Died: June 5, 1930 (aged 84) Richmond, British Columbia, Canada
- Party: Opposition

Thomas Kidd (February 23, 1846 – June 5, 1930) was an Irish-born farmer and political figure in British Columbia, Canada. He represented Westminster-Richmond in the Legislative Assembly of British Columbia from 1894 to 1903. He did not seek a fourth term in the Legislature in the 1903 provincial election.

He was born in County Down, the son of William Kidd and Margaret Garrett, and was educated there. Kidd arrived in Victoria, British Columbia in 1874, by way of New Zealand and California. Kidd settled on Lulu Island, where he operated a large farm and raised livestock. In 1883, he married Letitia Smith. Kidd served on the municipal council for Richmond for several years, also serving as reeve.

Kidd published History of Lulu Island and Occasional Poems in 1927.

He died in Richmond at the age of 84.
