= Thomas Basil Humphreys =

Canadian politician

MLA for Lillooet
- In office 1871–1875

MLA for Victoria District
- In office 1875–1882

MLA for Comox
- In office 1887–1890

Personal details
- Born: March 10, 1840 Liverpool, England
- Died: August 26, 1890 (aged 50) Victoria, British Columbia
- Spouse: Caroline "Carrie" Watkins (m. 1873)
- Children: Josephine Virginia Edwards, 2 sons, 1 daughter (with Lucy Semo)
- Occupation: Miner, auctioneer, conveyancer, politician
- Known for: Legislative Assembly of British Columbia

Thomas Basil Humphreys (March 10, 1840 – August 26, 1890) was an English-born miner, auctioneer and political figure in British Columbia. He represented Lillooet from 1871 to 1875, Victoria District from 1875 to 1882 and Comox from 1887 to 1890 in the Legislative Assembly of British Columbia.

He was born in Liverpool, the son of John Basil Humphreys and Mary Elizabeth Morgan, and was educated at Walton-on-the-Hill. Humphreys came to British Columbia by way of California in 1858. The following year, he was hired as a constable in Fort Hope, later transferring to Port Douglas. Humphreys resigned this job in 1860, returning to mining until 1864. He then worked as an auctioneer and conveyancer, soon afterwards moving to Lillooet. Humphreys lived in Lillooet with Lucy Semo, said to be a daughter of the chief of the Chehalis, with whom he had two sons and a daughter. He later married Caroline "Carrie" Watkins in 1873. Humphrey's daughter Josephine Virginia Edwards, who was born in 1868 and had moved to Victoria with him before his marriage, was sent to St. Mary's Indian Residential School in what is now Mission. She went on to become a prominent figure in Mission's early years.

In 1868, he was elected to the Legislative Council of British Columbia for Lillooet. Humphreys supported union with Canada. In April 1870, he was suspended from council after criticizing Joseph William Trutch and other members of the Legislative Council at a public meeting. He was reelected to the council by his constituents in November that same year. Humphreys moved the confidence motion which brought down the government of John Foster McCreight in 1872 but soon joined the opposition after he was not named to cabinet. In February 1876, he was named Minister of Finance and Agriculture in the provincial cabinet but he resigned in July, again joining the opposition. From 1878 to 1882, Humphreys served as Provincial Secretary and Minister of Mines. He was defeated when he ran for reelection in 1882 and again in a by-election later that same year in Yale. In 1886, Humphreys can unsuccessfully in Victoria District and then was defeated again when he ran for a federal seat. He was elected to the assembly for Comox in a December 1887 by-election held after Anthony Maitland Stenhouse resigned his seat to become a Mormon.

Humphreys helped promote the construction of the Lillooet–Burrard Inlet Cattle Trail, built from 1875 to 1877 to provide a more efficient route to coastal markets.

Humphreys died in office in Victoria at the age of 50.
