= John Paton Booth =

Canadian politician

John Paton Booth (20 December 1837 – 25 February 1902) was a Scottish-born political figure in British Columbia. He represented Cowichan from 1871 to 1875, The Islands from 1890 to 1894 and North Victoria from 1894 to 1902 in the Legislative Assembly of British Columbia. He was an unsuccessful candidate in both the 1875 and 1878 provincial elections.

Booth was born on Bressay, Shetland, Scotland, one of eight children of John Booth and Margaret Scott. He came to Guelph, Ontario with his family at a young age, was educated in Ontario and came to British Columbia in 1859. Booth lived on Salt Spring Island. He served as deputy speaker of the Legislature in 1896 and as speaker for the assembly in 1898 and from 1900 to 1902. Booth died in office at the age of 64 on Salt Spring Island after suffering for some time from Bright's disease.
