= John Bryden (British Columbia politician) =

Canadian politician

John Bryden (December 3, 1833 – March 27, 1915) was a Scottish-born businessman and political figure in British Columbia, Canada. He represented Nanaimo from 1875 to 1876 and North Nanaimo from 1894 to 1900 in the Legislative Assembly of British Columbia.

He was born in Dalzellyie, Kirkoswald, the son of John Brydan and Ann Cooper. Bryden received a certificate in mining and metallurgy and was hired by the Vancouver Coal Mining and Land Company operating near Nanaimo on Vancouver Island. In 1866, he married Elizabeth Hamilton, the daughter of Robert Dunsmuir who was a superintendent for the mine. In 1881, he went to work for a coal mining operation owned by his father-in-law. Bryden became a justice of the peace and served as a captain in the militia. He was president of the Albion Iron Works, treasurer for the Esquimalt and Nanaimo Railway and vice-president for the Union Colliery of British Columbia. The 1890 Coal Mines Regulation Act, provincial legislation, prevented persons of Chinese origin from working underground in coal mines. Bryden launched a legal challenge against the use of Chinese workers underground by the Union Colliery, with the intent of having the legality of the act reviewed: this resulted in the act being struck down since it was found that it interfered with federal powers.

In 1875, he was elected to the Nanaimo City Council and then to the British Columbia assembly; he resigned from the assembly in 1876. Bryden was defeated when he ran for reelection in 1900. Bryden died in Esquimault at the age of 81.
