= John Frederick Hume =

Canadian politician

John Frederick Hume (August 8, 1860 – February 6, 1935) was a miner, notary public and political figure in British Columbia. He represented the riding of West Kootenay South in the Legislative Assembly of British Columbia from 1894 to 1898, and then the riding of West Kootenay-Nelson from 1898 until his retirement at the 1900 provincial election. He was an unsuccessful candidate in the 1907 provincial election in the riding of Ymir, running as a candidate for the Liberal Party.

He was born in Jacksonville, New Brunswick, of Scottish origin, and was educated there. In 1891, Hume married Lydia J. Irvine. He served as a justice of the peace. Hume lived in Nelson. He served in the provincial cabinet as Provincial Secretary (August 1898 to March 1899) and Minister of Mines (August 1898 to February 1900). In 1898, Hume and his wife Lydia opened the Hume Hotel in Nelson. He sold the hotel to Wilmer C. Wells in 1907. Hume died in Nelson at the age of 74.
