= Alfred Wellington Smith =

Canadian politician

Alfred Wellington Smith (March 20, 1838 - December 25, 1907) was an English-born general merchant and political figure in British Columbia. He represented Lillooet from 1889 to 1894 and Lillooet West from 1894 to 1903 in the Legislative Assembly of British Columbia. He did not seek a sixth term in the Legislature in the 1903 provincial election.

He was born in Bedford and educated at the Epworth Normal School. Smith was government agent at Lillooet from 1873 to 1878 and operated as a general merchant until 1886. He married Margaret Ann Gillen in 1873. Smith was elected to the assembly in an 1889 by-election held after the death of Alexander Edmund Batson Davie. He died in Victoria.
