= Legislature of British Columbia =

Legislature of British Columbia, Canada

- 43rd Parliament of British Columbia

Type
- Type: Unicameral
- Houses: Legislative Assembly
- Sovereign: Lieutenant governor (representing the King of Canada, in right of British Columbia)

History
- Founded: July 20, 1871
- Preceded by: Governor-in-Council of the United Colony of British Columbia

Leadership
- Monarch: Charles III; September 8, 2022
- Lieutenant Governor: Wendy Lisogar-Cocchia; January 30, 2025
- Speaker of the Legislative Assembly: Raj Chouhan, New Democratic; December 7, 2020
- Premier: David Eby, New Democratic; November 18, 2022
- Leader of the Opposition: Lorne Doerkson, Conservative; September 20, 2026

The Legislature of British Columbia is made of two elements: the lieutenant governor (representing the King of Canada), and the Legislative Assembly of British Columbia (which meets at the British Columbia Parliament Buildings). The Legislature of British Columbia has existed since the province joined Canada in 1871, before which it was preceded by the Legislature of the United Colony of British Columbia.

Like the Canadian federal government, British Columbia uses a Westminster-style parliamentary government, in which members are sent to the Legislative Assembly after general elections and from there the party with the most seats chooses a premier of British Columbia and the Executive Council of British Columbia. The premier is British Columbia's head of government, while the King of Canada is its head of state and is represented by the lieutenant governor. Before 1903, candidates in British Columbia elections were not affiliated with political parties.

== List of parliaments ==
Following is a list of the 43 times the Legislature has been convened since 1871. This article only covers the time since 1871. For the governing body from 1867 to 1871, see Legislative Council of British Columbia.

| Assembly Sessions | Election | Opening date | Dissolution date | Governing party | Premier | Official Opposition party Leader | Other official parties Leader(s) | Speaker |
|---|---|---|---|---|---|---|---|---|
| 1st Parliament 4 sessions | 1st general | November 20, 1871 | August 30, 1875 | None (Note: Political parties did not exist in the British Columbia legislature before 1903) | John Foster McCreight (Note: Until December 1872) Amor De Cosmos (Note: Until February 1874); George Anthony Walkem | None (Note: Did not exist until 1903) | None | James Trimble |
| 2nd Parliament 3 sessions | 2nd general | January 10, 1876 | April 12, 1878 | None | George Anthony Walkem (Note: Until January 25, 1876) Andrew Charles Elliott | None | None | James Trimble |
| 3rd Parliament 5 sessions | 3rd general | July 29, 1878 | June 13, 1882 | None | George Anthony Walkem (Note: Until June, 1882) Robert Beaven | None | None | Frederick W. Williams |
| 4th Parliament 4 sessions | 4th general | January 25, 1883 | June 3, 1886 | None | Robert Beaven (Note: Until January, 1883) William Smithe | None | None | John Andrew Mara |
| 5th Parliament 4 sessions | 5th general | January 24, 1887 | May 10, 1890 | None | William Smithe (Note: Until March, 1887) Alexander Edmund Batson Davie (Note: Until August, 1889); John Robson | None | None | Charles Edward Pooley (Note: Until 1889) David Williams Higgins |
| 6th Parliament 4 sessions | 6th general | January 15, 1891 | June 2, 1894 | None | John Robson (Note: Until June, 1892) Theodore Davie | None | None | David Williams Higgins |
| 7th Parliament 4 sessions | 7th general | November 12, 1894 | June 7, 1898 | None | Theodore Davie (Note: Until March, 1895) John Herbert Turner | None | None | David Williams Higgins (Note: Until March, 1898) John Paton Booth |
| 8th Parliament 2 sessions | 8th general | January 5, 1899 | April 10, 1900 | None | John Herbert Turner (Note: Until August, 1898) Charles Augustus Semlin (Note: Until February, 1900); Joseph Martin | None | None | William Thomas Forster |
| 9th Parliament 4 sessions | 9th general | July 19, 1900 | June 16, 1903 | None | James Dunsmuir (Note: Until November, 1902) Edward Gawler Prior (Note: Until June, 1902); Richard McBride | None | None | John Paton Booth (Note: Until February 26, 1902) Charles Edward Pooley |
| 10th Parliament | 10th general | November 26, 1903 | December 24, 1906 | Conservative | Richard McBride | Liberal James Alexander MacDonald | None | Charles Edward Pooley |
| 11th Parliament | 11th general | March 7, 1907 | October 20, 1909 | Conservative | Richard McBride | Liberal James Alexander MacDonald | None | David McEwen Eberts |
| 12th Parliament | 12th general | January 20, 1910 | February 27, 1912 | Conservative | Richard McBride | Liberal James Alexander MacDonald | None | David McEwen Eberts |
| 13th Parliament | 13th general | January 16, 1913 | May 31, 1916 | Conservative | Richard McBride (Note: Until December, 1915) William John Bowser | Liberal Harlan Carey Brewster | None | David McEwen Eberts |
| 14th Parliament | 14th general | March 1, 1917 | October 23, 1920 | Liberal | Harlan Carey Brewster (Note: Until March, 1918) John Oliver | Conservative William John Bowser | None | John Walter Weart (Note: Until February, 1918) John Keen |
| 15th Parliament | 15th general | February 8, 1921 | May 10, 1924 | Liberal | John Oliver | Conservative James Alexander MacDonald | None | Alexander Malcolm Manson (Note: Until January 28, 1922) Frederick Arthur Pauline |
| 16th Parliament | 16th general | November 3, 1924 | June 7, 1928 | Liberal | John Oliver (Note: Until August 17, 1927) John Duncan MacLean | Conservative Robert Henry Pooley | Provincial Alexander Duncan McRae | John Andrew Buckham |
| 17th Parliament | 17th general | January 22, 1929 | August 1, 1933 | Conservative | Simon Fraser Tolmie | Liberal Thomas Dufferin Pattullo | None | James William Jones (Note: Until 1930) Cyril Francis Davie |
| 18th Parliament | 18th general | February 20, 1934 | April 12, 1937 | Liberal | Thomas Dufferin Pattullo | Co-operative Commonwealth Federation Robert Connell (Note: After August 1936, following a split in the party, the Social Constructive Party led by Connell became the official opposition) | Unionist Simon Fraser Tolmie | Henry George Thomas Perry |
| 19th Parliament | 19th general | October 26, 1937 | July 21, 1941 | Liberal | Thomas Dufferin Pattullo | Conservative Frank Porter Patterson | Co-operative Commonwealth Federation Harold Winch (Note: From June, 1939) | Norman William Whittaker |
| 20th Parliament | 20th general | December 4, 1941 | August 31, 1945 | Liberal-Conservative coalition | John Hart | Co-operative Commonwealth Federation Harold Winch | None | Norman William Whittaker |
| 21st Parliament | 21st general | February 1, 1946 | April 16, 1949 | Liberal-Conservative coalition | John Hart (Note: Until December 28, 1947) Byron Ingemar Johnson | Co-operative Commonwealth Federation Harold Winch | None | Norman William Whittaker (Note: Until 1947) Robert Henry Carson (Note: Until January, 1949); John Hart |
| 22nd Parliament | 22nd general | February 14, 1950 | April 10, 1952 | Liberal-Conservative coalition | Byron Ingemar Johnson | Co-operative Commonwealth Federation (Note: Until February, 1952) Harold Winch Conservative; Herbert Anscomb | None | Nancy Hodges |
| 23rd Parliament | 23rd general | February 3, 1953 | March 27, 1953 | Social Credit | W. A. C. Bennett | Co-operative Commonwealth Federation Harold Winch | Liberal Arthur Laing Progressive Conservative; Herbert Anscomb | Thomas James Irwin |
| 24th Parliament | 24th general | September 15, 1953 | August 13, 1956 | Social Credit | W. A. C. Bennett | Co-operative Commonwealth Federation Arnold Webster | Liberal Arthur Laing Progressive Conservative; Deane Finlayson | Thomas James Irwin |
| 25th Parliament | 25th general | February 7, 1957 | August 3, 1960 | Social Credit | W. A. C. Bennett | Co-operative Commonwealth Federation Robert Strachan | Liberal Ray Perrault | Thomas James Irwin (Note: Until April, 1957) Lorne Shantz |
| 26th Parliament | 26th general | January 26, 1961 | August 21, 1963 | Social Credit | W. A. C. Bennett | Co-operative Commonwealth Federation Robert Strachan | Liberal Ray Perrault | Lorne Shantz |
| 27th Parliament | 27th general | January 23, 1964 | August 5, 1966 | Social Credit | W. A. C. Bennett | New Democratic Party Robert Strachan | Liberal Ray Perrault | William Harvey Murray |
| 28th Parliament | 28th general | January 24, 1967 | July 21, 1969 | Social Credit | W. A. C. Bennett | New Democratic Party Robert Strachan | Liberal Ray Perrault | William Harvey Murray |
| 29th Parliament 3 sessions | 29th general | January 22, 1970 | July 24, 1972 | Social Credit | W. A. C. Bennett | New Democratic Party Dave Barrett | Liberal Pat McGeer | William Harvey Murray |
| 30th Parliament 5 sessions | 30th general | October 17, 1972 | November 3, 1975 | New Democratic Party | Dave Barrett | Social Credit W. A. C. Bennett (Note: Until November, 1973); Bill Bennett | Liberal David Anderson Progressive Conservative; Derril Thomas Warren | Gordon Dowding |
| 31st Parliament 4 sessions | 31st general | March 17, 1976 | April 3, 1979 | Social Credit | Bill Bennett | New Democratic Party William Stewart King (Note: Until June, 1976); Dave Barrett | Liberal Gordon Gibson Progressive Conservative; George Scott Wallace | Ed Smith (Note: Until 1978) Harvey Schroeder |
| 32nd Parliament 4 sessions | 32nd general | June 6, 1979 | April 7, 1983 | Social Credit | Bill Bennett | New Democratic Party Dave Barrett | None | Harvey Schroeder (Note: Until 1982) Kenneth Walter Davidson |
| 33rd Parliament 4 sessions | 33rd general | June 23, 1983 | September 24, 1986 | Social Credit | Bill Bennett (Note: Until August 1986) Bill Vander Zalm | New Democratic Party Dave Barrett (Note: Until May 1984); Bob Skelly | None | Kenneth Walter Davidson |
| 34th Parliament 5 sessions | 34th general | March 9, 1987 | September 19, 1991 | Social Credit | Bill Vander Zalm (Note: Until April 2, 1991) Rita Johnston | New Democratic Party Bob Skelly | None | John Douglas Reynolds (Note: Until 1989) Stephen Rogers |
| 35th Parliament 5 sessions | 35th general | March 17, 1992 | April 30, 1996 | New Democratic Party | Mike Harcourt (Note: Until February 22, 1996) Glen Clark | Liberal Gordon Wilson | Social Credit Rita Johnston | Joan Sawicki (Note: Until 1994) Emery Barnes |
| 36th Parliament 5 sessions | 36th general | June 25, 1996 | April 18, 2001 | New Democratic Party | Glen Clark (Note: Until August 25, 1999) Dan Miller (Note: Until February 24, 2000); Ujjal Dosanjh | Liberal Gordon Campbell | Reform Jack Weisgerber Progressive Democrat; Gordon Wilson | Dale Lovick (Note: Until 1998) Gretchen Brewin (Note: Until 2000); William James Hartley |
| 37th Parliament 6 sessions | 37th general | June 19, 2001 | April 19, 2005 | Liberal | Gordon Campbell | New Democratic Party Joy MacPhail | None | Claude Richmond |
| 38th Parliament 5 sessions | 38th general | September 12, 2005 | April 14, 2009 | Liberal | Gordon Campbell | New Democratic Party Carole James | None | Bill Barisoff |
| 39th Parliament 5 sessions | 39th general | August 29, 2009 | April 16, 2013 | Liberal | Gordon Campbell (Note: Until March 14, 2011) Christy Clark | New Democratic Party Adrian Dix | None | Bill Barisoff |
| 40th Parliament | 40th general | June 26, 2013 | April 11, 2017 | Liberal | Christy Clark | New Democratic Party Adrian Dix (Note: Until May 4, 2014); John Horgan | Green Andrew J. Weaver (Note: From December 9, 2015) | Linda Reid |
| 41st Parliament | 41st general | June 26, 2017 | September 21, 2020 | Liberal (Note: Until July 18, 2017; government defeated in a non-confidence vote June 29, 2017); New Democratic Party | Christy Clark (Note: Until July 18, 2017; government defeated in a non-confidence vote June 29, 2017); John Horgan | New Democratic Party (Note: Until July 18, 2017); John Horgan; Liberal; Christy Clark (Note: Until August 4, 2017); Rich Coleman (Note: Until February 3, 2018); Andrew Wilkinson | Green Andrew J. Weaver (Note: Until January 6, 2020); Adam Olsen (Note: Until September 14, 2020); Sonia Furstenau | Steve Thomson (Note: Until June 29, 2017) Darryl Plecas |
| 42nd Parliament | 42nd general | Dec 7, 2020 | Sep 21, 2024 | New Democratic Party | John Horgan (Note: Until November 18, 2022); David Eby | Liberal / BC United; Andrew Wilkinson (Note: Until November 21, 2020); Shirley Bond (Note: Until May 16, 2022); Kevin Falcon | Green; Sonia Furstenau | Raj Chouhan |
| 43rd Parliament | 43rd general | Feb 18, 2025 | Sep 22, 2026 | New Democratic Party | David Eby | Conservative; John Rustad (Note: Until December 4, 2025) Trevor Halford (Note: Until June 29, 2026); Heather Maahs (Note: Until September 20, 2026); Lorne Doerkson | Green; Jeremy Valeriote; OneBC; Dallas Brodie; CentreBC; Peter Milobar | Raj Chouhan |
