= Esquimalt-Port Renfrew =

Esquimalt-Port Renfrew was a provincial electoral district in the Canadian province of British Columbia from 1979 to 1986. Its predecessor riding was Esquimalt. It was redistributed into the ridings of Malahat-Juan de Fuca, Esquimalt-Metchosin and Saanich South.

For other Greater Victoria area ridings see List of electoral districts in Greater Victoria. For other Vancouver Island ridings see List of electoral districts on Vancouver Island or List of electoral districts in Greater Nanaimo.

== Demographics ==
Population, 1966
Population change, 1966–1986
Area (km^{2})
Population density (people per km^{2})

== History ==
Esquimalt-Port Renfrew
Assembly	Years	Member	Party
Esquimalt
10th	1903–1907	Charles Edward Pooley	Conservative
11th	1907–1909	John Jardine	Liberal
12th	1909–1912	John Jardine	Liberal
13th	1912–1916	Robert Henry Pooley	Conservative
14th	1916–1920	Robert Henry Pooley	Conservative
15th	1920–1924	Robert Henry Pooley	Conservative
16th	1924–1928	Robert Henry Pooley	Conservative
17th	1928–1933	Robert Henry Pooley	Conservative
18th	1933–1937	Robert Henry Pooley	Unionist
19th	1937–1941	Elmer Victor Finland	Conservative
20th	1941–1945	Elmer Victor Finland	Conservative
21st	1945–1949	Charles Taschereau Beard	Coalition
22nd	1949–1952	Charles Taschereau Beard	Coalition
23rd	1952–1953	Frank Mitchell	Co-operative Commonwealth
24th	1953–1956	Herbert Joseph Bruch	Social Credit
25th	1956–1960	Herbert Joseph Bruch	Social Credit
26th	1960–1963	Herbert Joseph Bruch	Social Credit
27th	1963–1966	Herbert Joseph Bruch	Social Credit
28th	1966–1969	Herbert Joseph Bruch	Social Credit
29th	1969–1972	Herbert Joseph Bruch	Social Credit
30th	1972–1975	Jim Gorst	New Democratic
31st	1975–1979	Lyle Kahl	Social Credit
Esquimalt-Port Renfrew
32nd	1979–1983	Frank Mitchell	New Democratic
33rd	1983–1986	Frank Mitchell	New Democratic
34th	1986–1991	Moe Sihota	New Democratic
Riding dissolved into Esquimalt-Metchosin, Malahat-Juan de Fuca and Saanich South

== Electoral history ==
Note: Winners in each election are in bold.

32nd British Columbia election, 1979
Party	Candidate	Votes	%	±	Expenditures
Western Independence	Orest Peter Jakubec	280	1.16%		
Social Credit	Lyle Benjaim James Kahl	9,812	40.58%		
Progressive Conservative	William James (Bill) Langlois	1,462	6.05%		
New Democratic	**Frank Mitchell**	**12,419**	**51.37%**		
Independent New Hope Party	Donald Cecil Stansall	72	0.30%		
Independent	Wayne Arthur Williams	131	0.54%		
Total valid votes		24,176			
Total rejected ballots		523			

33rd British Columbia election, 1983
Party	Candidate	Votes	%	±	Expenditures
Western Canada Concept	Kerry Gordon Greenwood	1,151	4.08%		unknown
Social Credit	Brian Lightburn	10,185	36.09%	–	unknown
New Democratic	**Frank Mitchell**	**16,304**	**57.77%**		unknown
Liberal	William Charles Stanley	580	2.06%		unknown
Total valid votes		28,220	100.00%		
Total rejected ballots		299			
Turnout		%			

34th British Columbia election, 1986
Party	Candidate	Votes	%	±	Expenditures
Liberal	Robert Henry Jones	1,293	4.54%		unknown
Social Credit	T. Brian Killip	11,649	40.93%	–	unknown
Western Canada Concept	Richard (Dick) Lewers	322	1.13%		unknown
New Democratic	**Munmohan Singh (Moe) Sihota**	**15,198**	**53.40%**		unknown
Total valid votes		28,462	100.00%		
Total rejected ballots		250			
Turnout		%			

== Sources ==
- Elections BC Historical Returns
