= 4th Parliament of British Columbia =

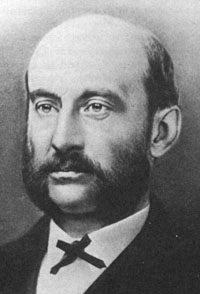
Robert Beaven, premier of British Columbia 1882-1883

The 4th Legislative Assembly of British Columbia sat from 1882 to 1886. The members were elected in the British Columbia general election held in July 1882. Robert Beaven formed a minority government in 1882. The Beaven government fell on a Motion of no confidence in January 1883. William Smithe formed a new government later that month.

There were four sessions of the 4th Legislature:

Session	Start	End
1st	January 25, 1883	May 12, 1883
2nd	December 3, 1883	February 18, 1884
3rd	January 12, 1885	March 9, 1885
4th	January 25, 1886	April 6, 1886

John Andrew Mara served as speaker.

== Members of the 4th Parliament ==
The following members were elected to the assembly in 1882:

Member	Electoral district	Party	First elected / previously elected	No.# of term(s)
George Cowan	Cariboo	Independent	1877	3rd term
Robert McLeese	Cariboo	Government (Note: Government candidates supported the Beaven administration)	1882	1st term
Charles Wilson	Cariboo	Opposition (Note: opposed to the Beaven administration)	1882	1st term
John Grant	Cassiar	Opposition	1882	1st term
William Munro Dingwall	Comox	Government	1882	1st term
William Smithe	Cowichan	Opposition	1871	4th term
Hans Lars Helgesen	Esquimalt	Government	1878	2nd term
Charles Edward Pooley	Esquimalt	Opposition	1882	1st term
Robert Leslie Thomas Galbraith	Kootenay	Government	1877	3rd term
Edward Allen	Lillooet	Opposition	1882	1st term
Alexander Edmund Batson Davie	Lillooet	Opposition	1875, 1882	2nd term*
Robert Dunsmuir	Nanaimo	Opposition	1882	1st term
William Raybould	Nanaimo	Opposition	1882	1st term
James Orr	New Westminster	Opposition	1882	1st term
John Robson	New Westminster	Opposition	1871, (Note: Nanaimo) 1882	2nd term*
William James Armstrong	New Westminster City	Government	1871, 1881	3rd term*
James Cunningham (1884)	New Westminster City	Government	1884	1st term
Robert Franklin John	Victoria	Opposition	1882	1st term
George Archibald McTavish	Victoria	Opposition	1882	1st term
Robert Beaven	Victoria City	Government	1871	4th term
Theodore Davie	Victoria City	Opposition	1882	1st term
Simeon Duck	Victoria City	Independent	1871, 1882	2nd term*
Montague William Tyrwhitt-Drake	Victoria City	Opposition	1882	1st term
Preston Bennett	Yale	Opposition	1878	2nd term
John Andrew Mara	Yale	Opposition	1871	4th term
Charles Augustus Semlin	Yale	Independent	1871, 1882	2nd term*
George Bohun Martin (1882)	Yale	Opposition	1882	1st term

== By-elections ==
By-elections were held for the following members appointed to the provincial cabinet, as was required at the time:

- William James Armstrong, Provincial Secretary, elected September 18, 1882
- Simeon Duck, Minister of Finance, elected April 15, 1885
- Alexander Edmund Batson Davie, Attorney General, acclaimed March 31, 1883
- William Smithe, Premier, acclaimed March 31, 1883
- John Robson, Provincial Secretary, Minister of Finance and Agriculture and Minister of Mines, acclaimed March 31, 1883

By-elections were held to replace members for various other reasons:

Electoral district	Member elected	Election date	Reason
Yale	George Bohun Martin	October 13, 1882	death of P. Bennett on August 9, 1882
New Westminster City	James Cunningham	April 21, 1884	W.J. Armstrong appointed sheriff April 5, 1884
