= Speaker of the Legislative Assembly of British Columbia =

Canadian provincial legislative officer

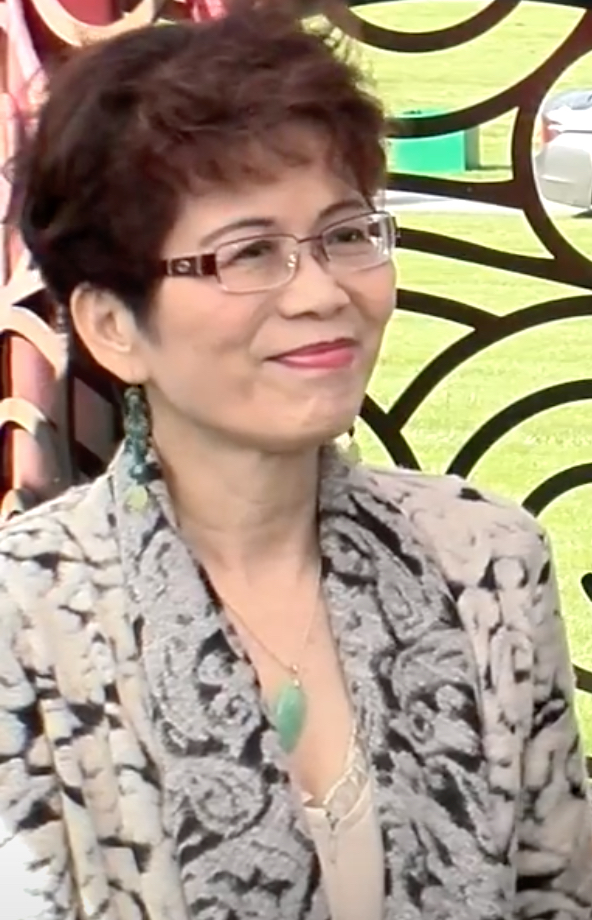
- Incumbent; Teresa Wat since Novemeber 20, 2026
- Style: The Honourable; Mr./Madam/Honourable Speaker (In the House)
- Appointer: Elected by the members of the Legislative Assembly
- Term length: Elected at the start of each Parliament
- Inaugural holder: James Trimble
- Salary: $150,000 (2017)

The Speaker of the Legislative Assembly of British Columbia is the presiding officer of the Legislative Assembly of British Columbia.

== Office of the Speaker in British Columbia ==
The speaker is elected by the members of the Legislative Assembly (MLAs) by means of a secret ballot at the commencement of a new parliament, or on the death or retirement of the previous speaker. Cabinet ministers are the only MLAs not entitled to stand for election as speaker. The business of the Legislative Assembly cannot continue without a speaker. Under British Columbia's parliamentary tradition, the lieutenant governor of British Columbia will not open Parliament until a speaker is elected.

Prior practice had been for the British Columbia premier to select the speaker and have that selection ratified by a vote of the legislative assembly. The Legislative Assembly also appoints a deputy speaker, who presides in the absence of the speaker. During the 38th Parliament, which was elected in the BC general election held on May 17, 2005, the position of assistant deputy speaker was created. This office is usually held by an MLA who represents the official opposition party.

Traditionally, the speaker has been a member of the governing party, though Speaker Darryl Plecas was an exception from 2017-2020; however, while holding the Office of Speaker, that MLA must act neutrally and treat all other MLAs impartially, and to preserve this impartiality the speaker follows Speaker Denison's rule in breaking ties. The speaker presides over the debates and procedures of the Legislative Assembly. The speaker enforces the Rules of Procedure, commonly referred to as the Standing Orders. Any disputes or procedural rulings are made according to the Standing Orders or, in absence of a rule governing a specific situation, to parliamentary precedence and convention. The speaker does not vote, except in the case of a tie.

Until the early 1990s, the traditional form of address and reference to the speaker was Mr. Speaker. Today, the office holder is now referred to as simply the speaker but, during debates, the MLAs may continue to address the officeholder as Mr. Speaker or Madam Speaker. In accordance with parliamentary tradition, all speeches are addressed to the speaker and not the other MLAs.

The speaker is responsible for the legislative precincts, including the Parliament Buildings. The speaker also sponsors the British Columbia Legislative Internship Program. The speaker represents the voters of their constituency as a member of the Legislative Assembly.

The channel televised proceedings is Hansard TV.

== Speakers of the Legislative Assembly of British Columbia ==
No.	Portrait	Name Electoral district (Birth–Death)	Term of office	Party	Parliament
1		James Trimble; MLA for Victoria City (1817–1885)	1872–1878	Independent	1st
1		James Trimble; MLA for Victoria City (1817–1885)	1872–1878	Independent	2nd
2		Frederick W. Williams; MLA for Esquimalt	1878–1882	Independent	3rd
3		John Andrew Mara; MLA for Yale (1840–1920)	1883–1886	Independent	4th
4		Charles Edward Pooley; MLA for Esquimalt (1845–1912)	1887–1889	Independent	5th
5		David Williams Higgins; MLA for Esquimalt (1834–1917)	1890–1898	Independent	5th
5		David Williams Higgins; MLA for Esquimalt (1834–1917)	1890–1898	Independent	6th
5		David Williams Higgins; MLA for Esquimalt (1834–1917)	1890–1898	Independent	7th
6		John Paton Booth; MLA for North Victoria (1837–1902)	1898	Independent	8th
7		William Thomas Forster; MLA for Westminster-Delta (1857–1938)	1899–1900	Independent	8th
(6)		John Paton Booth; MLA for North Victoria (1837–1902)	1900–1902	Independent	9th
(4)		Charles Edward Pooley; MLA for Esquimalt (1845–1912)	1902–1906	Independent	9th
(4)		Charles Edward Pooley; MLA for Esquimalt (1845–1912)	1902–1906	Conservative	10th
8		David McEwen Eberts; MLA for Saanich (1850–1924)	1907–1916	Conservative	11th
8		David McEwen Eberts; MLA for Saanich (1850–1924)	1907–1916	Conservative	12th
8		David McEwen Eberts; MLA for Saanich (1850–1924)	1907–1916	Conservative	13th
9		John Walter Weart; MLA for South Vancouver (1861–1941)	1917–1918	Liberal	14th
10		John Keen; MLA for South Vancouver (1844–1922)	1918–1920	Liberal	14th
11		Alexander Malcolm Manson; MLA for Omineca (1883–1964)	1921–1922	Liberal	15th
12		Frederick Arthur Pauline; MLA for Saanich (1861–1955)	1922–1924	Liberal	15th
13		John Andrew Buckham; MLA for Columbia (1873–1931)	1924–1928	Liberal	16th
14		James William Jones; MLA for South Okanagan (1869–1954)	1929–1930	Conservative	17th
15		Cyril Francis Davie; MLA for Cowichan-Newcastle (1882–1950)	1931–1933	Conservative	17th
16		Henry George Thomas Perry; MLA for Fort George (1889–1959)	1934–1937	Liberal	18th
17		Norman William Whittaker; MLA for Saanich (1893–1985)	1937–1947	Liberal	19th
17		Norman William Whittaker; MLA for Saanich (1893–1985)	1937–1947	Liberal–Conservative coalition	20th
17		Norman William Whittaker; MLA for Saanich (1893–1985)	1937–1947	Liberal–Conservative coalition	21st
18		Robert Henry Carson; MLA for Kamloops (1885–1971)	1948–1949	Liberal–Conservative coalition	21st
19		John Hart; MLA for Victoria City (1879–1957)	1949	Liberal–Conservative coalition	21st
20		Nancy Hodges; MLA for Victoria City (1888–1969)	1950–1952	Liberal–Conservative coalition	22nd
21		Thomas Irwin; MLA for Delta (1889–1962)	1953–1957	Social Credit	23rd
21		Thomas Irwin; MLA for Delta (1889–1962)	1953–1957	Social Credit	24th
21		Thomas Irwin; MLA for Delta (1889–1962)	1953–1957	Social Credit	25th
22		Lorne Shantz; MLA for North Okanagan (1920–1999)	1958–1963	Social Credit	25th
22		Lorne Shantz; MLA for North Okanagan (1920–1999)	1958–1963	Social Credit	26th
23		William Harvey Murray; MLA for Prince Rupert (1916–1991)	1964–1972	Social Credit	27th
23		William Harvey Murray; MLA for Prince Rupert (1916–1991)	1964–1972	Social Credit	28th
23		William Harvey Murray; MLA for Prince Rupert (1916–1991)	1964–1972	Social Credit	29th
24		Gordon Dowding; MLA for Burnaby (1918–2003)	1972–1975	New Democratic	30th
25		Ed Smith; MLA for Peace River North (1928–2010)	1976–1978	Social Credit	31st
26		Harvey Schroeder; MLA for Chilliwack (born 1933)	1978–1982	Social Credit	32nd
27		Walter Davidson; MLA for Delta (born 1937)	1982–1986	Social Credit	32nd
27		Walter Davidson; MLA for Delta (born 1937)	1982–1986	Social Credit	33rd
28		John Reynolds; MLA for West Vancouver-Howe Sound (born 1942)	1987–1989	Social Credit	34th
29		Stephen Rogers; MLA for Vancouver South (born 1942)	1990–1991	Social Credit	34th
30		Joan Sawicki; MLA for Burnaby-Willingdon (born 1945)	1992–1994	New Democratic	35th
31		Emery Barnes; MLA for Vancouver-Burrard (1929–1998)	1994–1996	New Democratic	35th
32		Dale Lovick; MLA for Nanaimo (born 1945)	1996–1998	New Democratic	36th
33		Gretchen Brewin; MLA for Victoria-Beacon Hill (born 1938)	1998–2000	New Democratic	36th
34		William James Hartley; MLA for Maple Ridge-Pitt Meadows (born 1945)	2000–2001	New Democratic	36th
35		Claude Richmond; MLA for Kamloops (born 1935)	2001–2005	Liberal	37th
36		Bill Barisoff; MLA for Penticton-Okanagan Valley (until 2009); MLA for Penticton (from 2009) (born 1948 or 1949)	2005–2013	Liberal	38th
36		Bill Barisoff; MLA for Penticton-Okanagan Valley (until 2009); MLA for Penticton (from 2009) (born 1948 or 1949)	2005–2013	Liberal	39th
37		Linda Reid; MLA for Richmond East (born 1959)	2013–2017	Liberal	40th
38		Steve Thomson; MLA for Kelowna-Mission (born 1951 or 1952)	2017	Liberal	41st
39		Darryl Plecas; MLA for Abbotsford South (born 1951)	2017–2020	Liberal	41st
39		Darryl Plecas; MLA for Abbotsford South (born 1951)	2017–2020	Independent	41st
40		Raj Chouhan; MLA for Burnaby-Edmonds (until 2024); MLA for Burnaby-New Westminster (from 2024)	2020–2026	New Democratic	42nd
40		Raj Chouhan; MLA for Burnaby-Edmonds (until 2024); MLA for Burnaby-New Westminster (from 2024)	2020–2026	New Democratic	43rd
41		Teresa Wat; MLA for Richmond-Bridgeport (from 2024); MLA for Richmond North Centre (2017-2024); MLA for Richmond Centre (2013-2017)	2026–present	Conservative	44th

== See also ==
- Speaker of the House of Commons (Canada)
