= 1882 British Columbia general election =

Canadian provincial election

← 1878	1882	1886 →

25 seats in the Legislative Assembly of British Columbia
Premier before election
Robert Beaven
Government
Premier after election
Robert Beaven
Government

The 1882 British Columbia general election was held in 1882.

== Political context ==
=== Non-party system ===
There were to be no political parties in the new province. The designations "Government" and "Opposition" and "Independent" (and variations on these) functioned in place of parties, but they were very loose and do not represent formal coalitions, more alignments of support during the campaign. "Government" meant in support of the current Premier; "Opposition" meant campaigning against him, and often enough the Opposition would win and immediately become the Government. The Elections British Columbia notes for this election describe the designations as "Government (GOV.) candidates supported the administration of G.A.B. Walkem. Those opposed ran as Reform (REF.), Opposition (OPP.), Independent Reform (IND.REF.), or Independent Opposition (IND.OPP.) candidates. Those who ran as straight Independents (IND.) were sometimes described as Government supporters (IND./GOV.).

=== The Beaven and Smithe governments ===
The election was precipitated by the resignation of Premier George Anthony Boomer Walkem. The Premiership was taken over by Robert Beaven, who managed to retain the reins of government though not with as much support as had been enjoyed by Walkem. His government lasted only about seven months, after which William Smithe became Premier due to shifting loyalties in the House, seeking and winning approval in the next election in May 1886.

=== Byelections not shown ===
Any changes due to byelections are shown below the main table showing the theoretical composition of the House after the election. A final table showing the composition of the House at the dissolution of the Legislature at the end of this Parliament can be found below the byelections. The main table represents the immediate results of the election only, not changes in governing coalitions or eventual changes due to byelections.

=== List of ridings ===
The original ridings were increased by one (Cassiar) and Cowichan was reduced to a one-member seat, although the total of 25 members remained. There were no political parties were not acceptable in the House by convention, though some members were openly partisan at the federal level (usually Conservative, although both Liberal and Labour allegiance were on display by some candidates).

These ridings were:

- Cariboo (three members) Cariboo
- Cassiar
- Comox
- Cowichan
- Esquimalt
- Kootenay
- Lillooet
- Nanaimo
- New Westminster (two members)
- New Westminster City
- Victoria (two members)
- Victoria City (four members)
- Yale (three members)

=== Polling conditions ===
Natives (First Nations) and Chinese were disallowed from voting, although naturalized Kanakas (Hawaiian colonists) and American and West Indian blacks and certain others participated. The requirement that knowledge of English be spoken for balloting was discussed but not applied.

== Results by riding ==
Results of British Columbia general election, 1882
Government		Opposition	
Member	Riding & party	Riding & party	Member
Robert McLeese	Cariboo; Government	Cariboo; Independent; Opposition	George Cowan
William Munro Dingwall	Comox; Government	Cariboo; Independent; Opposition	Charles Wilson
Hans Lars Helgesen	Esquimalt; Government	Cassiar; Opposition	John Grant
Robert Leslie Thomas Galbraith	Kootenay; Government	Cowichan; Opposition	William Smithe
William James Armstrong	New Westminster City; Government	Esquimalt; Opposition	Charles Edward Pooley
Robert Beaven ^{1}	Victoria City; Government	Lillooet; Opposition	Edward Allen
		Lillooet; Opposition	Alexander Edmund Batson Davie
		Nanaimo; Opposition	Robert Dunsmuir
		Nanaimo; Opposition	William Raybould
		New Westminster; Opposition	James Orr
		New Westminster; Opposition	John Robson
		New Westminster City; Opposition	William James Armstrong
		Victoria; Opposition	Robert Franklin John
		Victoria; Opposition	George Archibald McTavish
		Victoria City; Opposition	Theodore Davie
		Victoria City; Opposition	Simeon Duck
		Victoria City; Opposition	Montague William Tyrwhitt-Drake
		Yale; Opposition	Preston Bennett
		Yale; Opposition	John Andrew Mara
^{1} Premier-Elect and Incumbent Premier		Yale; Opposition	Charles Augustus Semlin
Source: Elections BC 1882 Results

== Byelections ==
As customary, byelections were held to confirm the appointment of various members to the Executive Council (cabinet).

- William James Armstrong, New Westminster City, April 21, 1884
- Simeon Duck, Victoria City, April 15, 1885
- Alexander Edmund Batson Davie, Lillooet, March 31, 1883
- William Smithe, Cowichan, March 31, 1883
- John Robson, New Westminster, March 31, 1883

Smithe's byelection acclamation confirmed him as Premier; Executive Council appointments were decided and made by the Lieutenant-Governor in this period, not by the Premier directly, but by the L-G in Consultation with the Premier (as still is the case, though only as a formal technicality, not in practice). The Premier's position itself was technically an appointment, as there were no political parties nor leaders, other than unofficial ones for each faction in the House to whom the Lieutenant-Governor would turn if their known caucus was sufficient to form a government.

Other byelections were held on the occasion of death, ill health, retirement and/or resignation for other reasons. These were won by:

- James Cunningham, New Westminster City, April 21, 1884, byelection held upon J. Armstrong's appointment as Sherriff April 5, 1884
- George Bohun Martin, Yale, October 13, 1882, byelection held because of death of P. Bennett August 9, 1882

== Composition of House at dissolution ==
Note: Government/Opposition status applies to candidate at time of election in 1882, not at time of dissolution in 1886.

Composition of 4th British Columbia Parliament at Dissolution, 1886
Government		Opposition	
Member	Riding & party	Riding & party	Member
Robert McLeese	Cariboo; Government	Cariboo; Independent; Opposition	George Cowan
William Munro Dingwall	Comox; Government	Cariboo; Independent; Opposition	Charles Wilson
Hans Lars Helgesen	Esquimalt; Government	Cassiar; Opposition	John Grant
Robert Leslie Thomas Galbraith	Kootenay; Government	Cowichan; Opposition	William Smithe^{1}
Ebenezer Brown	New Westminster City; Government	Esquimalt; Opposition	Charles Edward Pooley
Preston Bennett	Yale; Government	Lillooet; Opposition	Edward Allen
John Andrew Mara	Yale; Government	Lillooet; Opposition	Alexander Edmund Batson Davie
Forbes George Vernon	Yale; Government	New Westminster; Opposition	James Orr
Robert Beaven	Victoria City; Government	New Westminster; Opposition	John Robson
		New Westminster City; Opposition	James Cunningham
		Victoria; Opposition	Robert Franklin John
		Victoria; Opposition	George Archibald McTavish
		Victoria City; Opposition	Theodore Davie
		Victoria City; Opposition	Simeon Duck
		Victoria City; Opposition	Montague William Tyrwhitt-Drake
		Yale; Opposition	George Bohun Martin
		Yale; Opposition	John Andrew Mara
		Yale; Opposition	Charles Augustus Semlin
^{1}Premier at Dissolution			
Note: Government/Opposition/Independent Designations in this table are not indicative of house alignment at dissolution. This is because those who had been Opposition at the time of the election in 1882 may (or may not) have been part of the outgoing government bench at the time of dissolution.			
Source: Elections BC

== Further reading & references ==
- In the Sea of Sterile Mountains: The Chinese in British Columbia, Joseph Morton, J.J. Douglas, Vancouver (1974). Despite its title, a fairly thorough account of the politicians and electoral politics in early BC.
