= Lyle Kahl =

Canadian educator, businessman, and politician (1939–2020)

Lyle Benjamin James Kahl (June 27, 1939 – April 12, 2020) was an educator, businessman and political figure in British Columbia. He represented Esquimalt in the Legislative Assembly of British Columbia from 1975 to 1979 as a Social Credit member.

He was born in Rabbit Lake, Saskatchewan, the son of Henry and Clara Kahl, and was educated at the Saskatchewan Teacher's College, at the University of Alberta and at the University of Victoria. In 1961, he married Donna Marie Stewart. Kahl was defeated by Frank Mitchell when he ran for reelection to the assembly in the newly created riding of Esquimalt-Port Renfrew in 1979. He died in Victoria, British Columbia on April 12, 2020.
