= William Fisher (Canadian politician) =

Canadian politician

MLA for Esquimalt
- In office 1875–1878

Personal details
- Born: March 10, 1811 Cumberland, England
- Died: May 4, 1891 (aged 80) Victoria, British Columbia
- Party: Independent

William Fisher (March 10, 1811 – May 4, 1891) was a merchant and political figure in British Columbia, Canada. He represented Esquimalt in the Legislative Assembly of British Columbia from 1875 to 1878 as an Independent.

He was born in Cumberland, England, the son of William Fisher and Margaret Simon, and was educated in England. In 1832, Fisher entered his father's business, which was involved in trade in Africa, India, China, South America and Lower Canada. In 1844, he married Harriet Alice Birch. Fisher was elected to the town council for Liverpool in 1848. On 19 August 1849, Fisher made a balloon ascent at Princes Park, Liverpool, in honour of Queen Victoria and the Prince Consort. Fisher was one of the chief organisers of the fete and replaced one of the persons detailed to make the ascent due to their absence. Fisher's daughter Elizabeth was born that day. He first came to British Columbia in 1860 and settled in Esquimalt in 1863. He served as chairman of the Esquimalt school board. Fisher ran unsuccessfully for a seat in the British Columbia assembly in 1871. He was defeated when he ran for reelection in 1878.

His daughter Elizabeth married Charles Edward Pooley. He died in Victoria in 1891.
