= List of electoral districts in Greater Victoria =

This page is a listing of federal and provincial electoral districts and senate divisions in Canada using the name of Victoria, or located in, the area of the city of Victoria.

== Current federal electoral districts ==
- Victoria (first contested in 1924)
- Cowichan—Malahat—Langford (2015)
- Esquimalt—Saanich—Sooke (2015)
- Saanich-Gulf Islands (1996)

== Defunct federal electoral districts ==
- Victoria (1872–1903)
- Victoria City, a defunct federal electoral district in Victoria (1903–1924)
- Victoria District, a defunct federal electoral district in greater Victoria (1871–1872)
- Esquimalt—Saanich, a defunct federal electoral district in greater Victoria (1952–1987)
- Saanich-Gulf Islands, a federal electoral district in greater Victoria (1987–1996). Name retained by newer riding (listed above in current ridings) but parts of Esquimalt-Saanich were incorporated into the "new" seat.

== Current provincial electoral districts ==
Current provincial electoral districts in Victoria

- Victoria-Beacon Hill, current provincial electoral district in Victoria
- Victoria-Swan Lake, current provincial electoral district in Victoria comprising much of the former Victoria-Hillside district.
- Oak Bay-Gordon Head, current provincial electoral district in Victoria
- Saanich South, current provincial electoral district in greater Victoria
- Saanich North and the Islands, current provincial electoral district in greater Victoria
- Esquimalt-Colwood, current provincial electoral district in greater Victoria
- Langford-Highlands, current provincial electoral district in greater Victoria
- Juan de Fuca-Malahat, current provincial electoral district in greater Victoria

== Defunct provincial electoral districts ==
Defunct provincial electoral districts in the city of Victoria British Columbia.

- Victoria, defunct provincial electoral district, 1871–1890, 1966–1986
- Victoria City, defunct provincial electoral district, 1871–1963
- North Victoria, defunct provincial electoral district, 1894–1900
- Saanich and the Islands, 1966–2001
- Saanich, 1903–1963
- South Victoria, defunct provincial electoral district, 1894–1900
  - Oak Bay, defunct provincial electoral district, 1941–1975
    - Oak Bay-Gordon Head, 1979–present
- Esquimalt, 1871–1975
  - Esquimalt-Port Renfrew, 1979–1986
    - Esquimalt-Metchosin, 1991–present
- Langford-Juan de Fuca, 2008–2024

== Ridings named Victoria in other Canadian provinces and territories ==
- Victoria, North-West Territories (1894–1905)
- Victoria, Alberta federal (1907–1925)
- Victoria, Alberta provincial (1905–1940)
- Victoria, Ontario (1903–1966)
- Victoria, New Brunswick federal (1867–1914)
- Victoria, New Brunswick provincial (1846–1973)
- Victoria, Nova Scotia federal (1867–1904)
- Victoria, Nova Scotia provincial (1867–2003)

== Canadian Senate divisions ==
Canadian Senate divisions that have used the name Victoria include:

- Victoria, Quebec a permanent Senate division defined in the Consolidated Statutes 1859
- Victoria, Ontario
- Victoria, British Columbia
- Victoria, Nova Scotia
- Victoria, New Brunswick
- Victoria-Carelton, New Brunswick

== See also ==
- Canadian provincial electoral districts
