= List of electoral districts on Vancouver Island =

This article lists all historical and current federal and provincial electoral districts on the island of Vancouver Island in British Columbia, Canada. Before the 2025 Canadian federal election, the federal New Democratic Party (NDP) had a strong hold on Vancouver Island, with 6 out of 7 federal electoral districts being NDP held (the exception being Saanich—Gulf Islands, which has been federal Green held since 2011), after the 2025 election, the NDP lost almost all of their seats on Vancouver Island, except for Courtenay—Alberni.

== Federal ==
Current
| Electoral district | Member of Parliament | MP since | Political party | Predecessor |
|---|---|---|---|---|
| North Island—Powell River | Aaron Gunn | April 28, 2025 | Conservative | Rachel Blaney |
| Courtenay—Alberni | Gord Johns | October 19, 2015 | New Democratic | electoral district created |
| Nanaimo—Ladysmith | Tamara Kronis | April 28, 2025 | Conservative | Lisa Marie Barron |
| Cowichan—Malahat—Langford | Jeff Kibble | April 28, 2025 | Conservative | Alistair MacGregor |
| Esquimalt—Saanich—Sooke | Stephanie McLean | April 28, 2025 | Liberal | Randall Garrison |
| Saanich—Gulf Islands | Elizabeth May | May 2, 2011 | Green | Gary Lunn |
| Victoria | Will Greaves | April 28, 2025 | Liberal | Laurel Collins |

Former
| Electoral district | Electoral district created | Electoral district abolished |
|---|---|---|
| Vancouver Island | 1871 | 1874 |
| Victoria District | 1871 | 1872 |
| Vancouver | 1872 | 1903 |
| Victoria City | 1903 | 1924 |
| Comox—Atlin | 1904 | 1917 |
| Nanaimo | 1904 | 1962 |
| Esquimalt—Saanich | 1952 | 1987 |
| Nanaimo—Cowichan—The Islands | 1962 | 1979 |
| Comox—Alberni | 1987 | 1996 |
| Comox—Powell River | 1979 | 1988 |
| Cowichan—Malahat—The Islands | 1979 | 1988 |

== Provincial ==
Current
| Electoral district | Member of the Legislative Assembly | MLA since | Political party | Predecessor |
|---|---|---|---|---|
| Cowichan Valley | Debra Toporowski | October 19, 2024 | New Democratic | Sonia Furstenau |
| Mid Island-Pacific Rim | Josie Osborne | October 24, 2020 | New Democratic | Scott Fraser |
| North Island | Anna Kindy | October 19, 2024 | Conservative | Michele Babchuk |
| Oak Bay-Gordon Head | Diana Gibson | October 19, 2024 | New Democratic | Murray Rankin |
| Saanich North and the Islands | Rob Botterell | October 19, 2024 | Green | Adam Olsen |
| Saanich South | Lana Popham | May 12, 2009 | New Democratic | David Cubberley |
| Victoria-Beacon Hill | Grace Lore | October 24, 2020 | New Democratic | Carole James |

=== Historical ===
- Alberni
- Alberni-Qualicum
- Alberni-Nanaimo
- Cowichan
  - Cowichan-Alberni
  - Cowichan-Ladysmith
  - Cowichan-Malahat
- Malahat-Juan de Fuca
- Newcastle
  - Cowichan-Newcastle
- Esquimalt
  - Esquimalt-Port Renfrew
    - Esquimalt-Metchosin
- Nanaimo City
- Nanaimo and the Islands
- Nanaimo-Parksville
- The Islands
- Saanich and the Islands
- Oak Bay
- North Victoria
- South Victoria
- Victoria
- Victoria City
- Parksville
- Parksville-Qualicum
