= Hans Lars Helgesen =

Canadian politician

Hans Lars Helgesen (21 August 1831 – 1 September 1918) was a Member of the Legislative Assembly of British Columbia, Canada from 1878 to 1886 and from 1898 to 1900. He was a local pioneer, farmer, seafarer, prospector and Member of Parliament for Esquimalt and Cariboo.

Born in Asker, Norway in 1831, Helgesen is reckoned to be the first notable Norwegian immigrant to settle permanently in British Columbia, arriving from California to take part in the gold rush. During the 1860s he was elected to the colonial assembly.

In 1878 he was elected to the provincial legislature, representing the riding of Esquimalt. He won his seat again in the general election of 1882 but was defeated in the election of 1886. He ran again in the 1890 British Columbia general election but was again defeated. He returned to the Legislature in the 1898 provincial election, winning one of two seats in the Cariboo riding, and then retired from politics in the 1900 provincial election. With another Norwegian immigrant, Alfred Magnusson, he became successful in the development of the commercial fishery in Haida Gwaii. During the early 1900s Helgesen was employed as a fisheries Guardian for the Upper Skeena area and was instrumental in negotiating the Babine barricade agreement of 1906. He was promoted to Fisheries Overseer for the Lower Skeena area in September 1908 and retired in his eightieth year on December 31, 1910. He died in Metchosin, British Columbia in 1918 at the age of 87.

== Legacy ==
Helgesen Point on Pedder Bay near Metchosin, British Columbia is named for Hans Lars Helgesen as is Hans Helgesen Elementary School, located on Rocky Point Road in Metchosin.

Hans Lars Helgesen was the great-grandfather of the late George William Morrison Mutter (1912–1992), one-time warden for the Cowichan Valley area (Vancouver Island).

== Other sources ==
- Datum: A Newsletter of the Heritage Conservation Branch"(Ministry of Recreation and Conservation vol.3 no.2 spring 1978) Published in Victoria, British Columbia.
- Strangers Entertained: A History of the Ethnic Groups of British Columbia (John Norris, Evergreen Press, Vancouver. 1971)
- The First Hundred Years Metchosin Elementary School 1872-1972 (Marion I. Helegesen)
