= Charles Taschereau Beard =

Canadian politician (1890–1950)

Member of the Legislative Assembly of British Columbia
- In office 1945–1950
- Preceded by: Elmer Victor Finland
- Succeeded by: Frank Mitchell
- Constituency: Esquimalt

Personal details
- Born: July 30, 1890 Ottawa, Ontario, Canada
- Died: November 21, 1950 (aged 60) Saanich, British Columbia, Canada
- Party: British Columbia Liberal Party
- Spouse: Kathleen Kemp
- Children: Pamela Beard (1917-1983), Thomas Norman Kemp Beard (1921-1941)
- Occupation: naval officer

Charles Taschereau Beard (July 30, 1890 – November 21, 1950) was a naval officer and politician in British Columbia. After being defeated in the 1941 provincial election, he represented Esquimalt in the Legislative Assembly of British Columbia from 1945 to his death in 1950 as a member of the Liberal-Conservative coalition government.

He was born in Ottawa, the son of Frank Beard, and, at the age of 17, served two years aboard the British Merchant Training ship Conway. He then served aboard several Canadian fisheries patrol vessels. In 1909, Beard joined the Royal Naval Reserve and, in 1910, the Royal Canadian Navy. He served as senior naval officer at Esquimalt and as Commanding Officer and as Commander of the Dockyard at Naden. In October 1915, he married Kathleen Kemp. He served as commander of Maritime Forces Pacific in 1922. At the start of World War II, Beard came out of retirement to command HMCS Prince Robert, which captured the German merchant freighter Weser off the coast of Mexico. He later retired due to poor health. His son Midshipman Thomas Norman Kemp Beard was killed on HMS Hood during its encounter with the German battleship Bismarck in May 1941. Beard was a member of the Liberal-Conservative coalition in the provincial assembly. He died on November 21, 1950 and was buried with full military honours.
