= Frank Mitchell (Canadian politician) =

Canadian politician and plasterer (1925–2021)

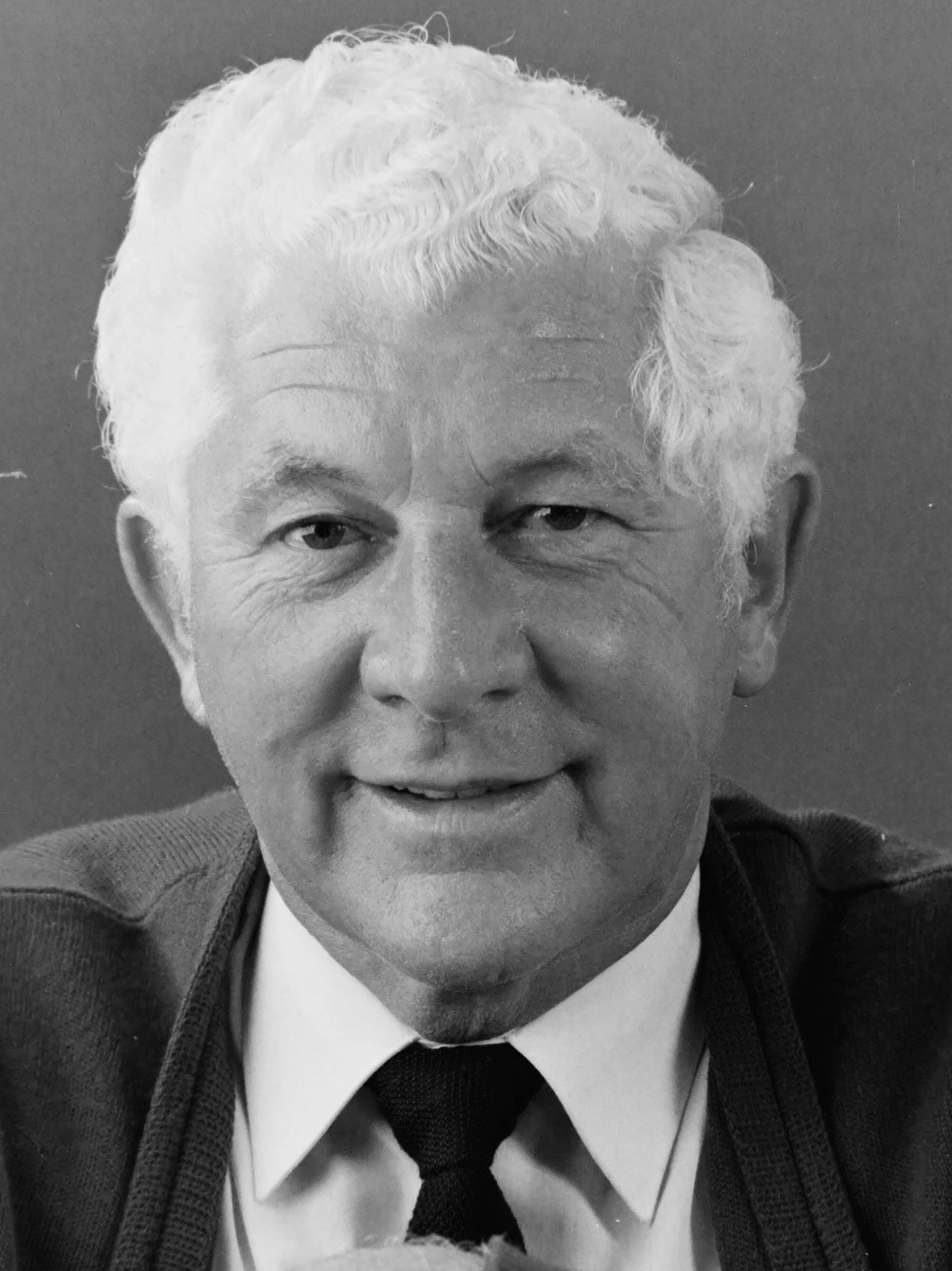

Member of the Legislative Assembly of British Columbia
- In office 1951–1953
- Preceded by: Charles Taschereau Beard
- Succeeded by: Herbert Joseph Bruch
- Constituency: Esquimalt
- In office 1979–1986
- Succeeded by: Moe Sihota
- Constituency: Esquimalt-Port Renfrew

Personal details
- Born: Franklin John Trehern Mitchell; December 27, 1925 Victoria, British Columbia
- Died: September 15, 2021 (aged 95)
- Party: CCF/NDP
- Spouse: Kathleen Patricia Doherty
- Children: 2
- Occupation: police officer

Franklin John Trehern Mitchell (December 27, 1925 – September 15, 2021) was a plasterer and political figure in British Columbia. He represented Esquimalt from 1951 to 1953 as a Co-operative Commonwealth Federation (CCF) member and Esquimalt-Port Renfrew from 1979 to 1986 as a New Democratic Party member in the Legislative Assembly of British Columbia.

After completing high school, Mitchell joined the Canadian Merchant Navy. He served in the infantry and paratroop division of the Canadian Army during World War II. He was elected to the provincial assembly in a 1951 by-election held following the death of Charles Taschereau Beard.

Mitchell was reelected in 1952 but then defeated when he ran for reelection to the assembly in 1953 and 1975.

In 1956, Mitchell became a police officer with the Esquimalt Police Department.
