= David McEwen Eberts =

Canadian politician (1850–1924)

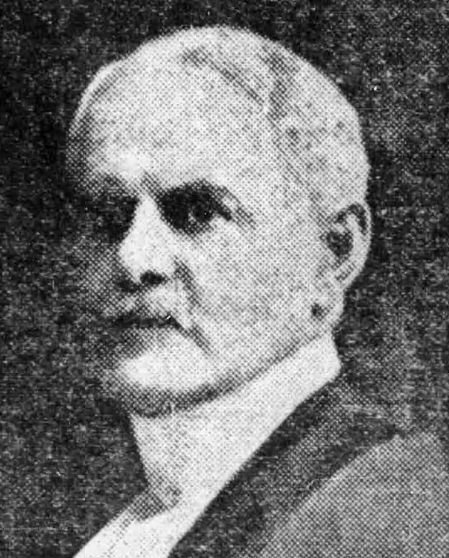

Member of the Legislative Assembly of British Columbia
- In office 1907–1916
- Constituency: Saanich

Attorney General of British Columbia
- In office 1895–1898
- In office 1900–1903

Member of the Legislative Assembly of British Columbia
- In office 1894–1903
- Constituency: South Victoria

Member of the Legislative Assembly of British Columbia
- In office 1890–1894
- Constituency: Victoria

Personal details
- Born: April 22, 1850 Chatham, Canada West
- Died: May 20, 1924 (aged 74) Victoria, British Columbia
- Party: Conservative
- Spouse: Mabel Hope Charles (m. 1884)
- Occupation: Lawyer, politician

David McEwen Eberts (April 22, 1850 – May 20, 1924) was a lawyer and political figure in British Columbia, Canada. He represented Victoria from 1890 to 1894, South Victoria from 1894 to 1903 and Saanich from 1907 to 1916 in the Legislative Assembly of British Columbia as a Conservative.

He was born in Chatham, Canada West, the son of William Duncan Eberts and Mary Bell McEwen, and was educated there and in London, Ontario. Eberts studied law, came to British Columbia in 1878 and was called to the British Columbia bar in 1882. He married Mabel Hope Charles in 1884. In 1892, he was named Queen's Counsel. He served in the Executive Council as Attorney General from 1895 to 1898 and from 1900 to 1903. He also served as Acting Minister of Mines from September 1901 to February 1902. Eberts was speaker for the assembly from 1907 to 1916. He was defeated when he ran for election to the assembly in 1903 and 1916.

Eberts died in Victoria at the age of 74.
