= 32nd Parliament of British Columbia =

The 32nd Legislative Assembly of British Columbia sat from 1979 to 1983. The members were elected in the British Columbia general election held in May 1979. The Social Credit Party led by Bill Bennett formed the government. The New Democratic Party (NDP) led by Dave Barrett formed the official opposition.

Harvey Schroeder served as speaker for the assembly until August 1982 when he resigned as speaker. Kenneth Walter Davidson replaced Schroeder as speaker in September 1982.

== Members of the 32nd Parliament ==
The following members were elected to the assembly in 1979:

Member	Electoral district	Party	First elected / previously elected	No.# of term(s)
Robert Evans Skelly	Alberni	NDP	1972	3rd term
Al Passarell	Atlin	NDP	1979	1st term
James J. (Jim) Hewitt	Boundary-Similkameen	Social Credit	1975	2nd term
Rosemary Brown	Burnaby-Edmonds	NDP	1972	3rd term
Eileen Dailly	Burnaby North	NDP	1966	5th term
James Gibson Lorimer	Burnaby-Willingdon	NDP	1969, 1979	4th term*
Alexander Vaughan Fraser	Cariboo	Social Credit	1969	4th term
William Samuel (Bill) Ritchie	Central Fraser Valley	Social Credit	1979	1st term
Harvey Schroeder	Chilliwack	Social Credit	1972	3rd term
James Roland Chabot	Columbia River	Social Credit	1963	6th term
Karen Elizabeth Sanford	Comox	NDP	1972	3rd term
Stuart Malcolm Leggatt	Coquitlam-Moody	NDP	1979	1st term
Barbara Brookman Wallace	Cowichan-Malahat	NDP	1975	2nd term
Kenneth Walter Davidson	Delta	Social Credit	1975	2nd term
George Mussallem	Dewdney	Social Credit	1966, 1975	4th term*
Frank Mitchell	Esquimalt-Port Renfrew	NDP	1951, 1979	3rd term*
Rafe Kenneth Mair	Kamloops	Social Credit	1975	2nd term
Claude Harry Richmond (1981)	Kamloops	Social Credit	1981	1st term
Terence Patrick Segarty	Kootenay	Social Credit	1979	1st term
Robert Howard McClelland	Langley	Social Credit	1972	3rd term
Don Lockstead	Mackenzie	NDP	1972	3rd term
Norman Levi	Maillardville-Coquitlam	NDP	1968, (Note: Vancouver South) 1972	4th term*
David Daniel Stupich	Nanaimo	NDP	1963, 1972	5th term*
Lorne Nicolson	Nelson-Creston	NDP	1972	3rd term
Dennis Geoffrey Cocke	New Westminster	NDP	1969	4th term
Colin Stuart Gabelmann	North Island	NDP	1972, (Note: North Vancouver-Seymour) 1979	2nd term*
Anthony Julius (Tony) Brummet	North Peace River	Social Credit	1979	1st term
Angus Creelman Ree	North Vancouver-Capilano	Social Credit	1979	1st term
John (Jack) Davis	North Vancouver-Seymour	Social Credit	1975	2nd term
Brian Ray Douglas Smith	Oak Bay-Gordon Head	Social Credit	1979	1st term
Patricia Jordan	Okanagan North	Social Credit	1966	5th term
William Richards Bennett	Okanagan South	Social Credit	1973	3rd term
Jack Joseph Kempf	Omineca	Social Credit	1975	2nd term
John Herbert (Jack) Heinrich	Prince George North	Social Credit	1979	1st term
William Bruce Strachan	Prince George South	Social Credit	1979	1st term
Graham Lea	Prince Rupert	NDP	1972	3rd term
James Arthur Nielsen	Richmond	Social Credit	1975	2nd term
Christopher D'Arcy	Rossland-Trail	NDP	1972	3rd term
Hugh Austin Curtis	Saanich and the Islands	Social Credit (Note: First elected as a Progressive Conservative)	1972	3rd term
William Stewart King	Shuswap-Revelstoke	NDP	1968, 1972	4th term*
Frank Howard	Skeena	NDP	1953, 1979	2nd term*
Donald McGray Phillips	South Peace River	Social Credit	1966, 1972	4th term*
Ernest Hall	Surrey	NDP	1966, 1979	4th term*
William Nick (Bill) Vander Zalm	Surrey	Social Credit	1975	2nd term
Emery Oakland Barnes	Vancouver Centre	NDP	1972	3rd term
Gary Lauk	Vancouver Centre	NDP	1972	3rd term
David Barrett	Vancouver East	NDP	1960, (Note: Dewdney) 1976	7th term*
Alexander Barrett MacDonald	Vancouver East	NDP	1960	7th term
Grace Mary McCarthy	Vancouver-Little Mountain	Social Credit	1966, 1975	4th term*
Evan Maurice Wolfe	Vancouver-Little Mountain	Social Credit	1966, (Note: Vancouver Centre) 1975	4th term*
Garde Basil Gardom	Vancouver-Point Grey	Social Credit	1966 (Note: First elected as a Liberal)	5th term
Patrick Lucey McGeer	Vancouver-Point Grey	Social Credit	1962	7th term
Peter Stewart Hyndman	Vancouver South	Social Credit	1979	1st term
Charles Stephen Rogers	Vancouver South	Social Credit	1975	2nd term
Charles Frederick Barber	Victoria	NDP	1975	2nd term
Gordon William Hanson	Victoria	NDP	1979	1st term
Louis Allan Williams	West Vancouver-Howe Sound	Social Credit	1966	5th term
Thomas Manville Waterland	Yale-Lillooet	Social Credit	1975	2nd term

== Party standings ==
Affiliation	Members
Social Credit	31
New Democratic	26
Total	57
Government Majority	5

== By-elections ==
By-elections were held to replace members for various reasons:

Electoral district	Member elected	Party	Election date	Reason
Kamloops	Claude Harry Richmond	Social Credit	May 14, 1981	K.R. Mair resigned February 1, 1981, to become a talk show host
