= Montague Drake =

Montague Drake may refer to:

- Montague Garrard Drake 1692–1728, British politician
- Montague Tyrwhitt Drake 1830 – 1908, English-born lawyer in Canada
