= John Keen (Canadian politician) =

Canadian politician

John Keen (January 23, 1844 – February 22, 1922) was the Speaker of the Legislative Assembly of British Columbia from 1918 to 1920. He succeeded John Walter Weart. He was a member of Liberal Party and had won the election for the 14th Parliament of British Columbia from the constituency of Kaslo. He had earlier been defeated in the 1900, 1907, and 1912 provincial elections. He was also defeated when he sought re-election in the 1920 provincial election.
