= Robert Dunsmuir =

Canadian businessman and politician

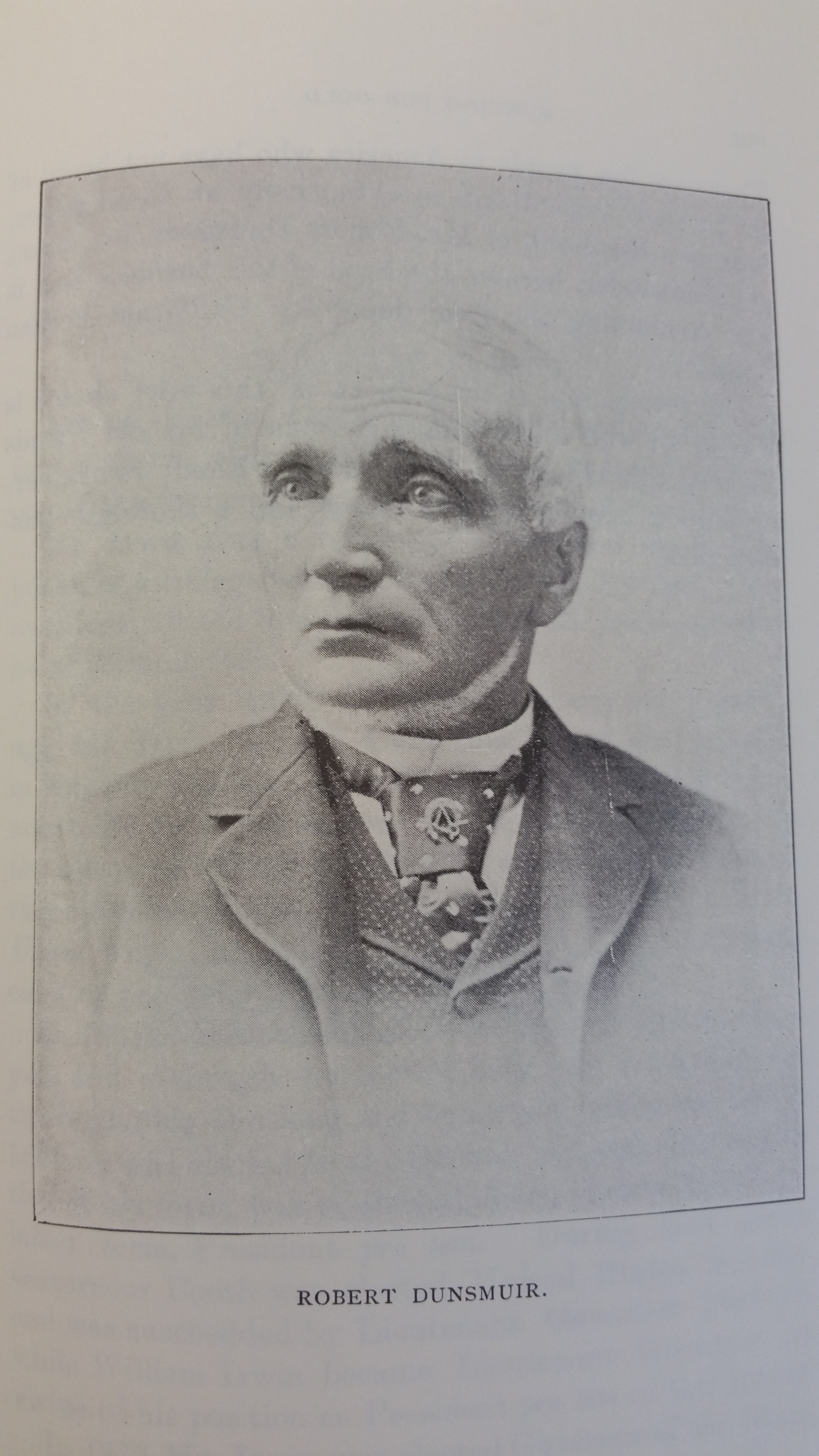
- Born: August 31, 1825; Hurlford, Scotland
- Died: April 12, 1889 (aged 63); Victoria, British Columbia, Canada
- Resting place: Ross Bay Cemetery
- Occupations: Businessman, politician
- Known for: Coal miner
- Title: MLA for Nanaimo
- Term: 1882–1886
- Spouse: Joanna (Joan) Olive White (m. 1847–1889)
- Children: 11 including James Dunsmuir

Robert Dunsmuir (August 31, 1825 – April 12, 1889) was a Scottish-born Canadian businessman and politician.

He was recognized as a National Historic Person by the government of Canada in 1971.

== Early life ==
Dunsmuir was born in Hurlford, Scotland, to 20-year-old James Dunsmuir and his wife Elizabeth in 1825. At the time of his birth, his family was engaged in the coal business in Ayrshire. Dunsmuir's grandfather, Robert, had leased coal properties and bought out local competitors in the days before the arrival of the railway in the 1840s permitting him to increase prices. In 1832, in the midst of this prosperity, Robert's mother, father, grandmother and two of his three sisters died within days of each other in a cholera epidemic which swept the area. Three years later, grandfather Robert died a relatively wealthy man, leaving a third of his estate in trust for his orphaned grandchildren. Dunsmuir was schooled locally at the Kilmarnock Academy and then at the Paisley Mercantile and Mechanical School, a training helpful in the coal business. He then went to work in local coal mines under his Aunt's husband Boyd Gilmour.

On September 11, 1847, at the age of 22, Dunsmuir married 19-year-old Joan White. Eight days later, their first child, Elizabeth Hamilton was born. Their second child, Agnes, was also born in Scotland in 1849.

At the end of 1850, Dunsmuir's mentor, and his aunt's husband, Boyd Gilmour, had signed on with the Hudson's Bay Company to exploit a coal finding on the northeast coast of Vancouver Island at Fort Rupert (near present-day Port Hardy). Because some of those who were to travel with him decided not to go upon hearing news of the conditions and prospects there, Gilmour sought replacements for his party at the last moment. On 24 hours' notice of this opportunity, Dunsmuir signed on. They sailed on the Pekin, for Fort Vancouver, via Cape Horn, on December 19, 1850. It took 191 days for them to arrive. Eight days later, on July 8, 1851, Joan Dunsmuir gave birth to their third child, James Dunsmuir.

== Early years in British Columbia ==
On July 18, 1851 they set sail for Fort Rupert, and when they arrived on August 9, the three-year term on the contract with the Hudson's Bay Company began. Gilmour struggled unsuccessfully to develop a producing coal operation at Fort Rupert until August 24, 1852 when Governor Douglas instructed them to move on to Nanaimo where a coal seam had been discovered. Work proceeded but living conditions were difficult. In 1854 when the term of their HBC contracts came up and Governor Douglas refused to increase their pay rates, Gilmour left to return to Scotland. Dunsmuir stayed on. He went on to propose to Douglas that he carry on personally with the operation of a seam that Gilmour had thought was played out. On October 12, 1855, Dunsmuir commenced work on his own account and within a month was producing seven tons of coal a day. This venture was a modest success, but as the seam ran out, Dunsmuir was again employed to operate a new pit that the HBC opened in 1860.

== Coal ==
The lease from the crown that gave the HBC the rights to all of the coal found on Vancouver Island ran out in 1859, requiring the company to purchase the 6,193 acres (2,506 ha) that made up its Nanaimo operation. With the new pit operational, the HBC sold its entire Nanaimo operation to the Vancouver Coal Mining and Land Company in September 1862 for $200,000. Dunsmuir worked from time to time as Superintendent of that company and, as well, for the Harewood Coal Company of his friend Dr Alfred Benson, which failed to raise the capital it needed to exploit its claim.

Once the crown lease the HBC held expired in 1859, it had become possible for claims to be staked by others. In October 1869 Dunsmuir was fishing for trout at Diver Lake, a few miles north and west of Nanaimo, when he found a coal outcrop. He staked a claim to 1,600 acres (647 ha) in a band 1,000 yards (914 m) wide and 4 miles (6 km) long including the north half of Diver Lake and running right to Departure Bay in the area known as Wellington. In order to stake a claim of this size, he was required to form a company, to be known as Dunsmuir, Diggle & Company. His sons James and Alexander and some others were partners but signed off once the legal requirement of partners in the venture had been met. Wadham Diggle, commander of the naval vessel Boxer, one of the first to use Dunsmuir's coal, invested $8,000 in the venture. Rear Admiral Arthur Farquhar, Commander in Chief of the Pacific Fleet invested a further $12,000. The two investors left the operation of the company to Dunsmuir. By 1873 the Wellington colliery was producing 16,000 of the 40,000 tons produced on Vancouver Island. By the end of 1875, Dunsmuir was producing 50,000 tons per year. Its two principal markets were San Francisco and the Royal Navy. The company bought out Farquhar in 1879 and in 1883 Diggle was paid $600,000 for his half share of the business, then producing a profit of $500,000 per year.

== Railway ==
Dunsmuir was one of the founders of the Esquimalt and Nanaimo Railway Company which built the rail line from Esquimalt to Nanaimo, later extended to Wellington, Victoria and Courtenay. His company received a grant of land comprising 20% of Vancouver Island as an incentive to build and equip the railway line to be owned and operated by the company. The Dunsmuir railway station was named after him.

== Politics ==
Dunsmuir was elected to the BC Legislature representing Nanaimo in the 1882 election while away on a European holiday, and was re-elected in 1886. Shortly after election to the legislature, he entered the cabinet. Dunsmuir died at Victoria, British Columbia while still in office.

== Craigdarroch ==
The home he built for his wife Joan Olive (White) Dunsmuir in Victoria, British Columbia is called Craigdarroch Castle and is today a popular tourist destination and National Historic Site of Canada.

== Family ==
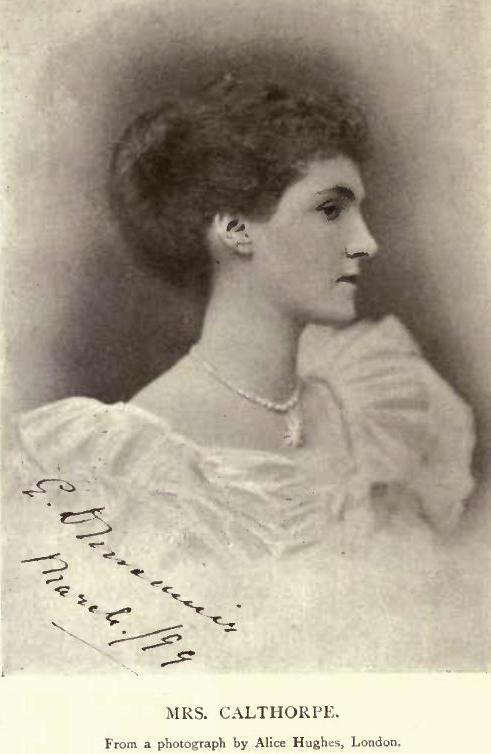
Mrs Effie Calthorpe née Dunsmuir

He and Joan had the following children together:

- Elizabeth Hamilton (1847–1901)
- Agnes Crooks (1849–1889)
- James (1851–1920)
- Alexander (1853–1900)
- Marion (1855–1892)
- Mary Jean (1862–1928)
- Emily Ellen (1864–1944)
- Jessie Sophia (1866–1946)
- Annie Euphemia (1868–1952)
- Henrietta Maude (1872–1950)

His son James Dunsmuir became premier of British Columbia and later, lieutenant governor of the province.

His daughter Effie (Anne Euphemia) Dunsmuir was married at St George's, Hanover Square in London, 27 February 1900, to Captain Somerset Gough-Calthorpe, R.N., Naval Attache to the British Embassy, St. Petersburg. He was the son of Lieut-General Hon. S. J. Calthorpe, and grandson of the 6th Lord Calthorpe.

Jessie Sophia became Lady Musgrave on her marriage to Sir Richard Musgrave.

== Legacy ==
Thirty-eight years after arriving at the Colony of Vancouver Island as an indentured $5 a week miner for the Hudson's Bay Company, he died the richest man in British Columbia in sole control of an empire estimated to be worth $15 million ($537 million today). His obituary in the Vancouver News-Advertiser said of him "he was neither a politician nor a statesman, as judged by the usual standards applied to such, but was a very practical, hard-headed and level-headed legislator who knew what he wanted and usually took the shortest route to its accomplishment.

== See also ==
- Dunsmuir House
- E&N Railway

== Sources ==
- Barman, Jean (2007). The West Beyond the West: A History of British Columbia (third ed.). University of Toronto Press. pp. 128–129, 134, 220, 402. ISBN 978-0-8020-9495-7.
- Bowen, Lynne (1999). Robert Dunsmuir: Laird of the Mines. XYZ Publishing. ISBN 0-9683601-3-0.
- Elliott, David R. (March 4, 2015). "Robert Dunsmuir". The Canadian Encyclopedia (online ed.). Historica Canada.
- Francis, Daniel, ed. (1999). Encyclopedia of British Columbia. Harbour Publishing. ISBN 1-55017-200-X.
- Gallacher, Daniel T. (1982). "Dunsmuir, Robert". In Halpenny, Francess G. (ed.). Dictionary of Canadian Biography. Vol. XI (1881–1890) (online ed.). University of Toronto Press.
- MacLachlan, Donald F. (1986). The Esquimalt & Nanaimo Railway - The Dunsmuir Years: 1884-1905. The B.C. Historical Railway Association. ISBN 0-9692511-0-6.
- Morgan, Henry James, ed. (1903). Types of Canadian Women and of Women who are or have been Connected with Canada. Toronto: Williams Briggs.
- Ormsby, Margaret A. (1958). British Columbia: A History. Vancouver: MacMillan.
- Reksten, Terry (1991). The Dunsmuir Saga. Vancouver: Douglas & McIntyre. ISBN 0-88894-742-9.
