= Herbert Joseph Bruch =

Canadian politician (1920–1993)

MLA for Esquimalt
- In office 1953–1972

Personal details
- Born: March 16, 1920 Killaly, Saskatchewan
- Died: May 26, 1993 (aged 73) Victoria, British Columbia
- Party: Social Credit Party of British Columbia

Herbert Joseph Bruch (March 16, 1920 – May 26, 1993) was a fruit farmer, businessman, civil servant and political figure in British Columbia, Canada. He represented Esquimalt in the Legislative Assembly of British Columbia from 1953 to 1972 as a Social Credit member. From 1967 to 1972, he served as the Deputy Speaker of the Legislature.

He was born in Killaly, Saskatchewan, the son of Joseph F. Bruch and Elizabeth Engel. In 1944, Bruch married Alice C. Gaudet. Before being elected to the assembly, he was employed by the British Columbia hospital insurance service. Bruch was defeated by James Henry Gorst when he ran for re-election in 1972. He died in 1993 of a ruptured aortic aneurysm.
