= David Williams Higgins =

Canadian politician

Member of the Legislative Assembly of British Columbia for Esquimalt
- In office 1886–1900

Personal details
- Born: 30 November 1834 Halifax, Nova Scotia
- Died: 30 November 1917 (aged 83) Victoria, British Columbia

David Williams Higgins (30 November 1834 – 30 November 1917) was a Canadian newspaperman, politician, and author.

Born in Halifax, Nova Scotia, the son of William B. Higgins and Mary Anne Williams, Higgins moved to Brooklyn with his parents and was educated there. He went to San Francisco, California in 1852 and in 1856 he founded the Morning Call newspaper, which he sold in 1858 when he moved to the Colony of Vancouver Island. He settled in Victoria, British Columbia and was editor and proprietor of the British Colonist. He organized and was first president of the Victoria fire department and was a member of the Board of Education from 1866 to 1869.

He was elected to the Legislative Assembly of British Columbia for the electoral district of Esquimalt in 1886. He was re-elected in 1890 and 1898. From 1890 to 1898, he was Speaker of the Legislative Assembly of British Columbia. He was defeated in 1900.

He later wrote two books of fictionalized reminisces: The mystic spring and other tales of western life (Toronto, 1904) and The passing of a race and more tales of western life (Toronto, 1905).

His daughter Maude Erve Higgins moved to Los Angeles, was a screenwriter, and married Thomas Corsan, becoming Maude Erve Corsan. His other daughter became Elizabeth Raymur.
