= 1886 British Columbia general election =

Canadian provincial election

The 1886 British Columbia general election was held in 1886. The number of members was increased for this election from 25 to 27, and the number of ridings increased to 13.

Each voter was allowed to cast as many votes as there were seats to fill in the district.

The first Labour candidates in BC's history ran in this election.

== Political context ==
=== Non-party system ===
There were to be no political parties in the new province. The designations "Government" and "Opposition" and "Independent" (and variations on these) functioned in place of parties, but they were very loose and do not represent formal coalitions, more alignments of support during the campaign. "Government" meant in support of the current Premier; "Opposition" meant campaigning against him, and often enough the Opposition would win and immediately become the Government.

=== The Smithe, A.E.B. Davie, Robson and T. Davie governments ===
The election mandated the government of William Smithe who had assumed power from the failure of Robert Beaven's government in January 1883. In May 1887 Smithe died in office and Alexander Edmund Batson Davie assumed power, although due to his own illness he was unable to attend the opening of the Legislature. When Davie died in 1889 a further change of government saw newspaperman John Robson become Premier that year, receiving a mandate in the 1890 election only to die himself in 1892 of blood poisoning from a cut suffered from the door of a carriage. He was succeeded by Theodore Davie, who was Premier going into the 1894 election

=== Byelections not shown ===
Any changes due to byelections are shown below the main table showing the theoretical composition of the House after the election. A final table showing the composition of the House at the dissolution of the Legislature at the end of this Parliament can be found below the byelections. The main table represents the immediate results of the election only, not changes in governing coalitions or eventual changes due to byelections.

=== List of ridings ===
The original ridings were thirteen in number, and Cowichan was restored to a two-member seat while New Westminster was increased to three, with the new total being 27 members. There were no political parties were not acceptable in the House by convention, though some members were openly partisan at the federal level (usually Conservative, although both Liberal and Labour allegiance were on display by some candidates).

These ridings were:

- Cariboo (three members)
- Cassiar (one member)
- Comox (one member)
- Cowichan (two members)
- Esquimalt (two members)
- Kootenay (two members)
- Lillooet (two members)
- Nanaimo (one member)
- New Westminster (three members)
- New Westminster City (one member)
- Victoria (two members)
- Victoria City (four members)
- Yale (three members)

=== Polling conditions ===
Natives (First Nations) and Chinese were disallowed from voting, although naturalized Kanakas (Hawaiian colonists) and American and West Indian blacks and certain others participated. The requirement that knowledge of English be spoken for balloting was discussed but not applied.

== Results by riding ==
Results of British Columbia general election, 1886
Government		Opposition	
Member	Riding & party	Riding & party	Member
Robert McLeese	Cariboo; Government	Cariboo; Opposition	George Cowan
Joseph Mason	Cariboo; Government	Cassiar; Opposition	John Grant
Henry Croft	Cowichan; Government	Comox; Opposition	Anthony Maitland Stenhouse
William Smithe ^{1}	Cowichan; Government	New Westminster; Opposition	William Henry Ladner
David Williams Higgins	Esquimalt; Government	New Westminster; Opposition	James Orr
Charles Edward Pooley	Esquimalt; Government	New Westminster City; Opposition	William Norman Bole
James Baker	Kootenay; Government	Victoria City; Opposition	Robert Beaven
Edward Allen	Lillooet; Government	Yale; Opposition	Charles Augustus Semlin
Alexander Edmund Batson Davie	Lillooet; Government		
Robert Dunsmuir	Nanaimo; Government		
William Raybould	Nanaimo; Government		
John Robson	New Westminster; Government		
George William Anderson	Victoria; Government		
Robert Franklin John	Victoria; Government		
Theodore Davie	Victoria City; Government		
Edward Gawler Prior	Victoria City; Government		
John Herbert Turner	Victoria City; Government		
George Bohun Martin	Yale; Government		
Forbes George Vernon	Yale; Government		
^{1} Premier-Elect and Incumbent Premier			
Source: Elections BC

== See also ==
- List of British Columbia political parties

== Further reading & references ==
- In the Sea of Sterile Mountains: The Chinese in British Columbia, Joseph Morton, J.J. Douglas, Vancouver (1974). Despite its title, a fairly thorough account of the politicians and electoral politics in early BC.
