= 14th Parliament of British Columbia =

The 14th Legislative Assembly of British Columbia sat from 1917 to 1920. The members were elected in the British Columbia general election held in September 1916. The British Columbia Liberal Party, led by Harlan Carey Brewster, formed the government. Following Brewster's death in March 1918, John Oliver became Premier.

John Walter Weart served as speaker until the start of the 1918 session, when John Keen succeeded him as speaker.

== Members of the 14th Parliament ==
The following members were elected to the assembly in 1916.:

Member	Electoral district	Party	First elected / previously elected	No.# of term(s)
Harlan Carey Brewster (Note: Elected in both Alberni and Victoria City; choose to sit for Victoria City)	Alberni	Liberal	1907, 1916	4th term*
Richard Pateman Wallis (1918)	Alberni	Conservative	1918	1st term
Richard John Burde (1919)	Alberni	Independent Soldier	1919	1st term
Frank Harry Mobley	Atlin	Liberal	1916	1st term
John MacKay Yorston	Cariboo	Liberal	1907, 1916	2nd term*
Edward Dodsley Barrow	Chilliwack	Liberal	1916	1st term
John Andrew Buckham	Columbia	Liberal	1916	1st term
Hugh Stewart	Comox	Liberal	1916	1st term
William Henry Hayward	Cowichan	Independent	1900, (Note: Esquimalt) 1907	5th term*
Kenneth Forrest Duncan (1919)	Cowichan	Unionist	1919	1st term
James Horace King	Cranbrook	Liberal	1903, 1916	3rd term*
Francis James Anderson MacKenzie	Delta	Conservative	1909	3rd term
John Oliver	Dewdney	Liberal	1900, (Note: Westminster-Delta) 1916	4th term*
Robert Henry Pooley	Esquimalt	Conservative	1912	2nd term
Alexander Ingram Fisher	Fernie	Liberal	1916	1st term
William Roderick Ross	Fort George	Conservative	1903	5th term
James Edwin Wallace Thompson	Grand Forks	Liberal	1916	1st term
John Duncan MacLean	Greenwood	Liberal	1916	1st term
Malcolm Bruce Jackson	The Islands	Liberal	1916	1st term
Frederick William Anderson	Kamloops	Liberal	1916	1st term
John Keen	Kaslo	Liberal	1916	1st term
Archibald McDonald	Lillooet	Conservative	1903, 1909	4th term*
William Sloan	Nanaimo	Liberal	1916	1st term
William Oliver Rose	Nelson	Conservative	1916	1st term
Parker Williams	Newcastle	Independent Socialist	1903	5th term
James Hawthornthwaite (1918)	Newcastle	Independent Socialist	1901, 1918	6th term*
David Whiteside	New Westminster	Liberal	1916	1st term
Kenneth Cattanach MacDonald	North Okanagan	Liberal	1916	1st term
George Samuel Hanes	North Vancouver	Liberal	1916	1st term
Alexander Malcolm Manson	Omineca	Liberal	1916	1st term
Thomas Dufferin Pattullo	Prince Rupert	Liberal	1916	1st term
William Henry Sutherland	Revelstoke	Liberal	1916	1st term
Gerald Grattan McGeer	Richmond	Liberal	1916	1st term
William David Willson	Rossland	Liberal	1916	1st term
Frederick Arthur Pauline	Saanich	Liberal	1916	1st term
Lytton Wilmot Shatford	Similkameen	Conservative	1903	5th term
William Alexander McKenzie (1918)	Similkameen	Conservative	1918	1st term
Charles Franklin Nelson	Slocan	Liberal	1916	1st term
James William Jones	South Okanagan	Conservative	1916	1st term
John Walter Weart	South Vancouver	Liberal	1916	1st term
James Hargrave Schofield	Trail	Conservative	1907	4th term
William John Bowser	Vancouver City	Conservative	1903	5th term
John Sedgwick Cowper	Vancouver City	Liberal	1916	1st term
John Wallace deBeque Farris	Vancouver City	Liberal	1916	1st term
Malcolm Archibald Macdonald	Vancouver City	Liberal	1916	1st term
John William McIntosh	Vancouver City	Liberal	1916	1st term
John William McIntosh	Vancouver City	Independent Liberal	1916	1st term
Ralph Smith	Vancouver City	Liberal	1898, (Note: South Nanaimo) 1916	3rd term*
Mary Ellen Smith (1918)	Vancouver City	Independent	1918	1st term
George Bell	Victoria City	Liberal	1916	1st term
Harlan Carey Brewster	Victoria City	Liberal	1907, (Note: Alberni) 1916	4th term*
Henry Charles Hall	Victoria City	Liberal	1916	1st term
John Hart	Victoria City	Liberal	1916	1st term
Francis William Henry Giolma (1918)	Victoria City	Soldier	1918	1st term
Joseph Walters	Yale	Liberal	1916	1st term

== Party standings ==
Affiliation	Members
Liberal	36
Conservative	9
Independent	1
Independent Socialist	1
Total	47
Government Majority	25

== By-elections ==
By-elections were held for the following members appointed to the provincial cabinet, as was required at the time:

- James Horace King, Minister of Public Works, acclaimed January 3, 1917
- John Oliver, Minister of Agriculture and Railways, acclaimed January 3, 1917
- John Duncan MacLean, Provincial Secretary and Minister of Education, acclaimed January 3, 1917
- William Sloan, Minister of Mines, acclaimed January 3, 1917
- Malcolm Archibald Macdonald, Attorney General, elected January 3, 1917
- Ralph Smith, Minister of Finance, elected January 3, 1917
- Harlan Carey Brewster, Premier, acclaimed January 3, 1917
- Thomas Dufferin Pattullo, Minister of Lands, elected January 13, 1917
- John Wallace deBeque Farris, Attorney General and Minister of Labour, acclaimed June 23, 1917
- John Hart, Minister of Finance, elected June 30, 1917
- Edward Dodsley Barrow, Minister of Agriculture, elected May 25, 1918

By-elections were held to replace members for various other reasons:

Electoral district	Member elected	Party	Election date	Reason
Alberni	Richard Pateman Wallis	Conservative	January 24, 1918	H.C. Brewster resigned; elected in both Alberni and Victoria City
Newcastle	James Hurst Hawthornthwaite	Independent Socialist	January 24, 1918	P. Williams resigned; named to Workmen's Compensation Board January 1, 1917
Similkameen	William Alexander McKenzie	Conservative	January 24, 1918	L.W. Shatford resigned; named to Senate of Canada June 23, 1917
Vancouver City	Mary Ellen Smith	Independent	January 24, 1918	death of R. Smith, February 12, 1917
Victoria City	Francis William Henry Giolma	Soldier	January 24, 1918	death of H.C. Brewster, March 1, 1918
Alberni	Richard John Burde	Independent Soldier	January 29, 1919 (Note: Acclaimed)	death of R.P. Wallis, October 14, 1918
Cowichan	Kenneth Forrest Duncan	Unionist	January 25, 1919	W.H. Hayward resigned; official military duties in Ottawa

== Other changes ==
- John William McIntosh resigns from the Liberals in April 1917 to become an Independent Liberal.
- At some point in the life of the legislature McIntosh, Richard John Burde, Kenneth Forrest Duncan and Francis William Henry Giolma form the Soldier Party.
- Aitlin (dec. Frank Harry Mobley February 3, 1920)
