= Walter Davidson (Canadian politician) =

Canadian politician (born 1937)

Member of the Legislative Assembly of British Columbia
- In office 1975–1991
- Preceded by: Carl Liden
- Succeeded by: John Savage
- Constituency: Delta

27th Speaker of the Legislative Assembly of British Columbia
- In office 1982–1986
- Preceded by: Harvey Schroeder
- Succeeded by: John Douglas Reynolds

Personal details
- Born: Kenneth Walter Davidson; July 28, 1937 (age 89) Georgetown, Ontario, Canada
- Party: British Columbia Social Credit Party
- Education: University of British Columbia
- Occupation: City planner

Kenneth Walter Davidson (born July 28, 1937) is a former political figure in British Columbia, Canada. He represented Delta in the Legislative Assembly of British Columbia from 1975 to 1991 as a Social Credit member.

He was born in Georgetown, Ontario, the son of David Douglas Davidson and Helen Tessman, and was educated in Welland and at the University of British Columbia. He was a city planner for Vancouver and a director for the Vancouver public library. Davidson lived in Delta. He was deputy speaker for the assembly from 1980 to 1982 and speaker for the assembly from 1982 to 1986.
