= Jim Gorst =

Canadian politician (1922–2020)

James Henry Gorst
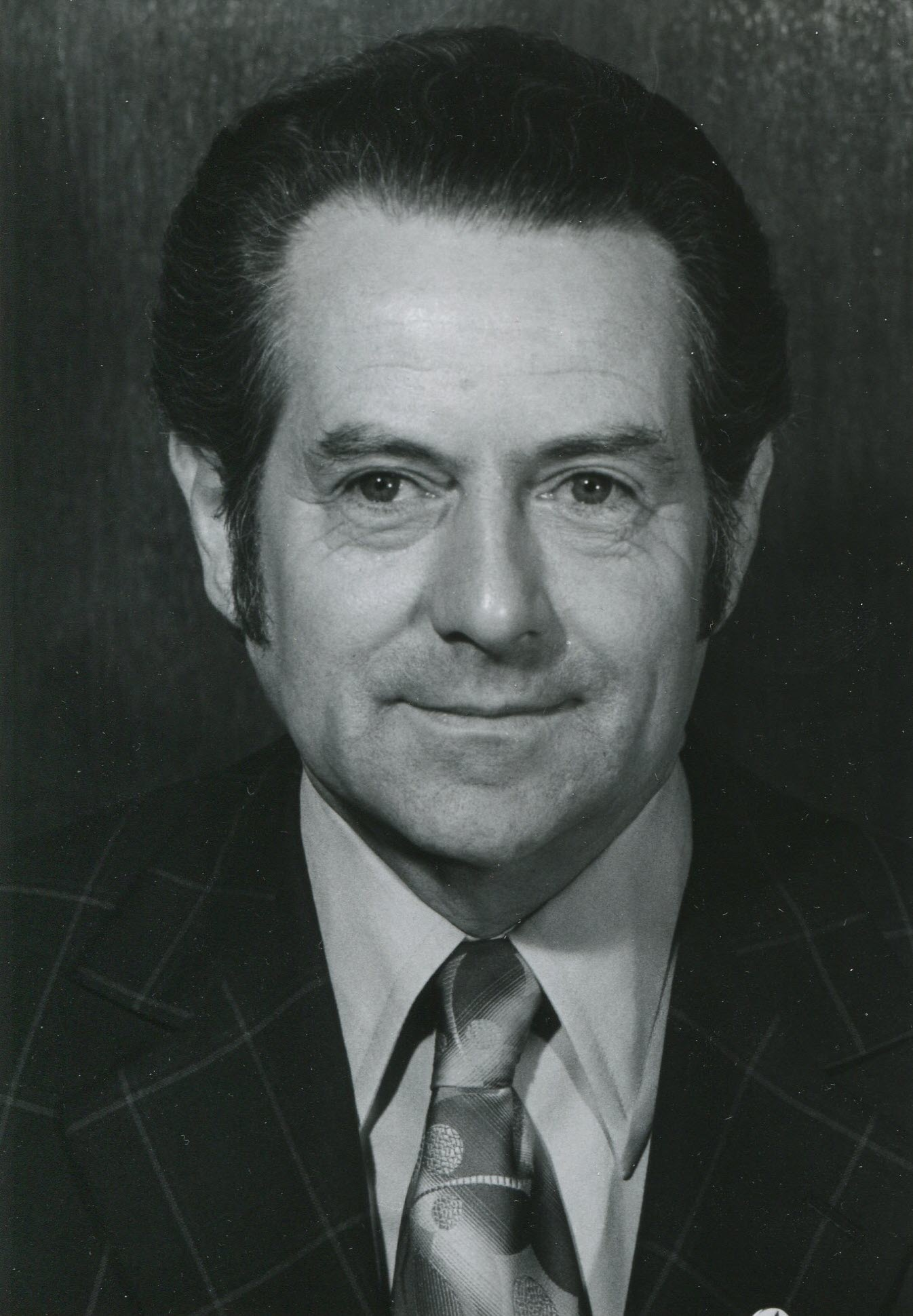

MLA for Esquimalt
- In office 1972–1975

Personal details
- Born: August 12, 1922 Victoria, British Columbia
- Died: December 15, 2020 (aged 98)
- Party: British Columbia New Democratic Party
- Spouse: Cecilia McCreadie

James Henry Gorst (August 12, 1922 – December 15, 2020) was a Canadian politician. He served in the Legislative Assembly of British Columbia from 1972 to 1975, as a NDP member for the constituency of Esquimalt. He was previously an unsuccessful Liberal Party candidate in the 1965 federal election for the constituency of Esquimalt-Saanich. He died in December 2020 at the age of 98.
