= George Archibald McTavish =

Canadian politician

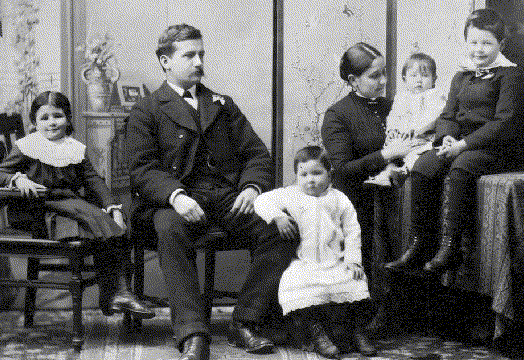
- George Archibald McTavish (second left) with his family in 1877 at Victoria

MLA for Victoria
- In office 1882–1886

Personal details
- Born: December 14, 1856 New York City, New York, U.S.
- Spouse: Catherine Amelia Helmcken

George Archibald McTavish (December 14, 1856 – after 1893) was an American-born farmer and political figure in British Columbia. He represented Victoria in the Legislative Assembly of British Columbia from 1882 until his retirement at the 1886 provincial election.

He was born in New York City in 1856, the son of D. A. McTavish, who was manager of the Bank of British North America at New York. McTavish was educated there and came to British Columbia around the age of 16. In 1877, he married Catherine Amelia "Amy", the daughter of Doctor John Sebastian Helmcken and granddaughter of James Douglas. McTavish served as president of the British Columbia Agricultural Association. He was a seed-producer and florist, and also raised livestock. McTavish owned a large farm in North Saanich but moved to Esquimalt after his marriage. He was a founding member of the Victoria Yacht Club.

After serving in the provincial legislature, George was successful in winning an elected position on the city council at Victoria. In spring 1893 he left Victoria for a trip to the British Columbia interior, but was never heard from again. Some historians believe he relocated to French Polynesia, abandoning his family and taking on an assumed name.
