= Harvey Schroeder =

Canadian politician

26th Speaker of the Legislative Assembly of British Columbia
- In office March 30, 1978 – August 10, 1982
- Preceded by: Ed Smith
- Succeeded by: Kenneth Walter Davidson

Member of the British Columbia Legislative Assembly for Chilliwack
- In office August 30, 1972 – October 22, 1986
- Preceded by: William Kenneth Kiernan
- Succeeded by: John Jansen

Personal details
- Born: June 16, 1933 (age 92) Main Centre, Saskatchewan, Canada
- Party: British Columbia Social Credit Party
- Spouse: Ella-Mae McMann (m. 1955)
- Children: three
- Occupation: accountant

Harvey Wilfred Schroeder (born June 16, 1933) is a former businessman and political figure in British Columbia. He represented Chilliwack in the Legislative Assembly of British Columbia from 1972 to 1986 as a Social Credit member.

He worked as an accountant for Canada Packers, later opening his own business in Chilliwack.

In 1973, he ran for the leadership of the Social Credit party. After serving as deputy speaker for the British Columbia assembly from 1976 to 1978, Schroeder was speaker for the British Columbia assembly from 1978 to 1982. Schroeder resigned as speaker in August 1982 and subsequently served in the provincial cabinet as Minister of Agriculture.
