= Cassiar (electoral district) =

Defunct provincial electoral district in British Columbia, Canada

Cassiar was a provincial electoral district in the Canadian province of British Columbia. It first appeared in the British Columbia general election of 1882.

== Electoral history ==
Note: Winners in each election are in bold.

4th 1882 British Columbia general election
Party	Candidate	Votes	%	±	Expenditures
Government	William V. Brown	18	31.58%	–	unknown
Opposition	**John Grant**	**39**	**68.42%**	–	unknown
Total valid votes		57	100.00%		
Total rejected ballots					
Turnout		%			

5th 1886 British Columbia general election
Party	Candidate	Votes	%	±	Expenditures
Government	John Dempsey ^{1}	n/a	%	–	unknown
Opposition	**John Grant ^{1}**	**n/a**	%	–	unknown
Total valid votes			100.00%		
Total rejected ballots					
Turnout		%			
^{1} "No strictly accurate return available - the Returning Officer merely stating: 'John Grant elected by a majority of 3'."

6th 1890 British Columbia general election
Party	Candidate	Votes	%	±	Expenditures
Opposition	Robert Cunningham	46	42.59%	–	unknown
Government	**Robert Hanley Hall**	**62**	**57.41%**	–	unknown
Total valid votes		108	100.00%		
Total rejected ballots					
Turnout		%			

7th 1894 British Columbia general election
Party	Candidate	Votes	%	±	Expenditures
Independent (Government?)	William Dalby	45	30.61%		unknown
Government	**John Irving**	**102**	**69.39%**	–	unknown
Total valid votes		147	100.00%		
Total rejected ballots					
Turnout		%			

8th 1898 British Columbia general election ^{2}
Party	Candidate	Votes	%	±	Expenditures
Government	**Charles William Digby Clifford**	**148**	**46.54%**	–	unknown
Government	**John Irving**	**125**	**39.31%**	–	unknown
Independents	George Simpson McTavish	45	14.15%		unknown
Total valid votes		318	100.00%		
Total rejected ballots					
Turnout		%			
^{2} Increased to a two-member seat from one.

1900 British Columbia general election
Party	Candidate	Votes	%	Elected
Conservative-Opposition	Charles William Digby Clifford	318	30.67	✓
Unknown	James Stables^{3}	277	26.71	✓
Independent Opposition	John Irving	244	23.53	
Unknown	Alexander Godfrey^{3}	198	19.09	
Total valid votes		1,037	100.00	
^{3} Neither Godfrey nor Stables' affiliation were mentioned in the newspapers. Stables may have been an Independent Government supporter.

Cassiar riding was eliminated in the redistribution after the 1900 election. In the 1903 election, this region was represented by the new Atlin and Skeena ridings.

== See also ==
- List of British Columbia provincial electoral districts
- Canadian provincial electoral districts
