= John Jardine (British Columbia politician) =

Canadian politician

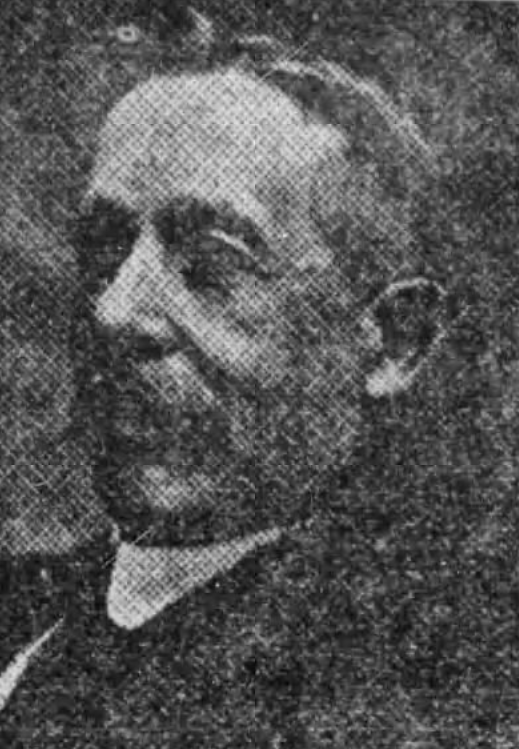

Member of the Legislative Assembly of British Columbia
- In office 1907–1912
- Constituency: Esquimalt

Personal details
- Born: September 24, 1854 Lockerbie, Scotland
- Died: October 15, 1937 (aged 83) Esquimalt, British Columbia
- Party: Liberal
- Spouse: Jane King Stoddart (m. 1880)
- Occupation: Joiner, decorator, politician

John Jardine (September 24, 1854 – October 15, 1937) was a Scottish-born joiner, decorator and political figure in British Columbia. He represented Esquimalt from 1907 to 1912 in the Legislative Assembly of British Columbia as a Liberal.

== Biography ==
He was born in Lockerbie, the son of John Jardine and Janet Montgomery, and educated in Dryfesdale. Jardine apprenticed as a house painter with his older brother Thomas for five years and then continued to work at that trade in Scotland for about three more years. He moved to St. Paul, Minnesota in 1880. In the same year, he married Jane King Stoddart. Jardine stayed in Minnesota until 1884, when he moved to Victoria, British Columbia. He owned a ranch on the British Columbia Electric Railway near Langley. The Jardine station was named in his honour. However, he lived in Esquimalt.

Jardine was an unsuccessful candidate for a seat in the assembly in 1903. He was defeated when he ran for reelection in 1912. He served as a member of the Royal Commission on Labour, and was also a member of the local board of trade.

He died in Esquimalt at the age of 83.
