= Elmer Victor Finland =

Canadian politician (1894–1968)

MLA for Esquimalt
- In office 1937–1945

Personal details
- Born: July 8, 1894 Victoria, British Columbia
- Died: May 26, 1968 (aged 73) Victoria, British Columbia
- Party: British Columbia Conservative Party
- Spouse: Gladys Luetta McDonald
- Children: Daphne
- Profession: Lawyer

Elmer Victor Finland (July 8, 1894 – May 26, 1968) was a lawyer and political figure in British Columbia. He represented Esquimalt in the Legislative Assembly of British Columbia from 1937 to 1945 as a Conservative. He served as deputy speaker of the Legislature from 1941 to 1944. He was an unsuccessful candidate in the 1949 provincial election.

He was born in Victoria, British Columbia, the son of George Robert Finland and Kate C. Finnerty, and was educated at McGill University and Stanford University. In 1921, he married Gladys L. MacDonald. Finland served as a lieutenant in the Royal Flying Corps and the Royal Air Force during World War I. In March 1945, it was announced that he was unable to attend further sessions of the assembly because he was returning to duties with the Royal Canadian Air Force. He died in 1968.
