= Robert Henry Pooley =

Canadian politician (1878–1954)

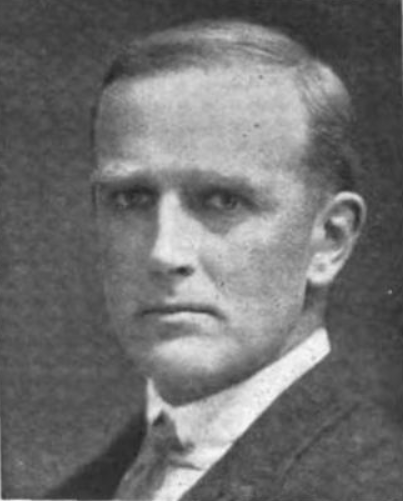

Attorney General of British Columbia
- In office 1928–1933

Member of the Legislative Assembly of British Columbia
- In office 1912–1937
- Constituency: Esquimalt

Personal details
- Born: September 19, 1878 Esquimalt, British Columbia
- Died: June 23, 1954 (aged 75) Victoria, British Columbia
- Party: Conservative (1912—1933), Unionist (1933—1937)
- Spouse: Laura Loewen (m. 1904)
- Parent: Charles Edward Pooley (father)
- Occupation: Lawyer, politician

Robert Henry Pooley (September 19, 1878 – June 23, 1954) was a Canadian lawyer and political figure in British Columbia. He represented Esquimalt from 1912 to 1937 as a Conservative. Pooley was interim leader of the party from August 1924 to November 1926.

== Biography ==
Pooley was born in Esquimalt, the son of Charles Edward Pooley, and was educated at Bradfield College in Berkshire, England. Pooley practiced law in Victoria from 1896. In 1904, he married Laura Loewen. Pooley was Leader of the Opposition in the assembly from 1924 to 1928. He served in the provincial cabinet as Attorney-General from August 1928 to November 1933. He also served as Minister of Public Works between July and September 1933.

In the 1933 British Columbia general election, Pooley stood for the Unionist Party of British Columbia, the grouping supporting Premier Simon Fraser Tolmie following the fragmentation of the provincial Conservative Party. He retained Esquimalt and was the only Unionist candidate elected; Tolmie lost his own seat.

He did not seek an eighth term in the 1937 provincial election. Pooley died in Victoria at the age of 75.
