= John Walter Weart =

Canadian politician

John Walter Weart (July 17, 1861 – February 10, 1941) was a lawyer, businessman and political figure in British Columbia. He represented South Vancouver in the Legislative Assembly of British Columbia from 1916 until his retirement at the 1920 provincial election as a Liberal.

He was born in 1861 at Balderson Corner, Lanark, Ontario, the son of John Weart. Weart was employed at a foundry in Brockville and then worked as a carpenter in Belleville from 1873 to 1879. After obtaining a teacher's certificate, he taught school in Hastings County. Weart travelled west and worked in the furniture business in Manitoba from 1882 to 1890. In 1883, he married Minnie Reid. Weart studied law in British Columbia with George H. Cowan and went on to practice law from 1898 to 1905. He was an unsuccessful candidate for a seat in the provincial assembly in 1907. Weart was manager and solicitor for the Metropolitan Building Company. He served as reeve of Burnaby in 1911 and 1912. Weart was speaker for the provincial assembly from 1917 until the start of the 1918 session. His building company was credited with initiating the construction of the first skyscrapers in Vancouver. Weart died in Vancouver in 1941.

The Weart Glacier and Mount Weart in northern Garibaldi Provincial Park were named in his honour; Weart was named chairman of the park's board in 1927.
