= Robert Franklin John =

Canadian politician

Robert Franklin John (January 1851 – May 29, 1905) was a Welsh-born farmer and political figure in British Columbia. He represented Victoria in the Legislative Assembly of British Columbia from 1882 to 1888. His name also appears as Robert Franklyn John.

He was born in Glamorganshire but received much of his education in Victoria, British Columbia. In 1882, he married Rose Ella Dean. He served as Collector and Assessor for Victoria and Esquimalt districts. In 1888, he resigned his seat after accepting the position of warden for the provincial jail at Victoria. John died in Victoria at the age of 54.
