= William Raybould =

Canadian politician

William Raybould (ca 1836 – December 3, 1886) was a miner, merchant and political figure in British Columbia. He represented Nanaimo in the Legislative Assembly of British Columbia from 1882 until his death in 1886.

Raybould came to Vancouver Island with his wife, the former Phoebe Shakespeare, in 1864 from Staffordshire, England. In 1866, he opened a menswear store, the Nanaimo Emporium, in partnership with his brother-in-law Noah. He served as a member of the first Nanaimo City Council in 1875. He worked for twenty years as pit head for a mine operated by the Vancouver Coal Company. Later in life, he assisted his wife with the management of her millinery shop. He died after falling from a wharf behind the shop while the tide was out, apparently investigating a noise from the shop. Raybould was 50 at the time and had been re-elected to a second term in the Legislature just a few months earlier.
