= Charles Edward Pooley =

Canadian politician

Charles Edward Pooley, KC (February 8, 1845 – March 28, 1912) was a lawyer and political figure in British Columbia, Canada. He represented Esquimalt in the Legislative Assembly of British Columbia from 1882 to 1906 as a Conservative.

He was born in Upwood, Huntingdonshire, England, the son of Thomas Pooley and Sarah Brighty, and was educated in England. He came to Victoria, then capital of the Colony of Vancouver Island, in 1862. Pooley was named deputy Registrar General of the Supreme Court of British Columbia in 1863 and later was Registrar General until 1879. In 1869, he married Elizabeth, the daughter of William Fisher. He was admitted to the British Columbia bar in 1877 and practised in partnership with A. E. B. Davie. Pooley was named King's Counsel in 1888 and served as Treasurer (chief elected officer) of the Law Society of British Columbia from 1892 to 1894 and from 1897 to 1912. He was Speaker of the Legislative Assembly of British Columbia from 1887 to 1889, when he was named president of the Executive Council. Although there was no formal party system in British Columbia prior to 1903, Pooley is identified as a "Conservative" in 1883. He was president of the Executive Council until 1902, when he again served as speaker until 1906.

He was defeated by John Jardine when he ran for reelection in 1907.

He became wealthy attending to the legal business of the Dunsmuir interests.

Pooley died in Victoria at the age of 67.
