= Esquimalt (electoral district) =

Esquimalt was a provincial electoral district in the province of British Columbia, Canada. It was one of the province's first twelve ridings upon its entry into Confederation. It was redistributed following the 1975 election into Esquimalt-Port Renfrew and Saanich and the Islands.

== Election results ==
Note: Winners of each election are in bold.

1st 1871 British Columbia general election
Party	Candidate	Votes	%	±	Expenditures
Independent	Charles Berry Brown	5	2.75%		unknown
Independent	David Cameron	31	17.03%		unknown
Independent	Henry S. Caulier	9	4.95%		unknown
**Independent**	**Henry Cogan**	**34**	**18.68%**		unknown
Independent	William Fisher	29	15.93%		unknown
**Independent**	**Alexander Rocke Robertson**	**74**	**40.66%**		unknown
Total valid votes		182	100.00%		
Total rejected ballots					
Turnout		%			

British Columbia byelection: Esquimalt, November 27, 1871 ^{1}
Party	Candidate	Votes	%	±	Expenditures
**Independent**	**Alexander Rocke Robertson**	**Acclaimed**	-.- %		unknown
Total valid votes		n/a	-.- %		
Total rejected ballots					
Turnout		%			
^{1} The byelection was called due to the resignation of A.R. Robertson upon appointment to Executive Council 14 November 1871. As this byelection writ was filled by acclamation, no polling day was required and the seat was filled within two weeks. The stated date is the date the return of writs was received by the Chief Electoral Officer.

1875 British Columbia general election
Party	Candidate	Votes	%	Elected
Independent	William Fisher	58	32.58	✓
Reform caucus	Frederick W. Williams	52	29.21	✓
Government	Robert Weir (politician)	Robert Weir]]	43	24.16
Government	Ninian Frederick Foster	25	14.05	
Total valid votes		178	100.00	

3rd 1878 British Columbia general election
Party	Candidate	Votes	%	±	Expenditures
Government	William Fisher	45	15.41%	–	unknown
Opposition	**Hans Lars Helgesen**	**70**	**37.43%**	–	unknown
Opposition	**Frederick W. Williams**	**78**	**41.00%**	–	unknown
Total valid votes		187	100.00%		
Total rejected ballots					
Turnout		%			

4th 1882 British Columbia general election
Party	Candidate	Votes	%	±	Expenditures
Opposition	Francis Thomas Child	61	21.71%	–	unknown
Government	**Hans Lars Helgesen**	**77**	**27.40%**	–	unknown
Government	John Roland Hett^{2}	71	25.27%	–	unknown
Opposition	**Charles Edward Pooley^{2}**	**72**	**25.62%**	–	unknown
Total valid votes		281	100.00%		
Total rejected ballots					
Turnout		%			
^{2} The official returns gave Hett 74 votes and Pooley 73, but a B.C. Supreme Court decision altered the results and declared Pooley elected.

5th 1886 British Columbia general election
Party	Candidate	Votes	%	±	Expenditures
Opposition	Hans Lars Helgesen	70	16.87%	–	unknown
Opposition	John Roland Hett	72	17.35%	–	unknown
Government	**David Williams Higgins**	**123**	**29.64%**	–	unknown
Government	**Charles Edward Pooley**	**150**	**36.14%**	–	unknown
Total valid votes		415	100.00%		
Total rejected ballots					
Turnout		%			

6th 1890 British Columbia general election
Party	Candidate	Votes	%	±	Expenditures
Opposition	Hans Lars Helgesen	89	22.20%	–	unknown
Government	**David Williams Higgins**	**155**	**38.65%**	–	unknown
Government	**Charles Edward Pooley**	**157**	**39.15%**	–	unknown
Total valid votes		401	100.00%		
Total rejected ballots					
Turnout		%			

7th 1894 British Columbia general election
Party	Candidate	Votes	%	±	Expenditures
Government	**David Williams Higgins**	**Accl.**	--%	–	unknown
Government	**Charles Edward Pooley**	**Accl.**	--%	–	unknown
Total valid votes		--	--%		
Total rejected ballots					
Turnout		%			

8th 1898 British Columbia general election
Party	Candidate	Votes	%	±	Expenditures
Government	William Fitzherbert T. Bullen^{3}	208	23.94%	–	unknown
Opposition	Deenis Reginald Harris	53	6.10%	–	unknown
Opposition	William Henry Hayward	189	21.75%	–	unknown
Government	**David Williams Higgins^{3}**	**206**	**23.70%**	–	unknown
Opposition	**Charles Edward Pooley**	**213**	**24.51%**	–	unknown
Total valid votes		869	100.00%		
Total rejected ballots					
Turnout		%			
^{3} Results taken from the Victoria Colonist 12 July 1898. Although Bullen received more votes than Higgins, the B.C. Supreme Court controverted his election and declared Higgins elected instead.

9th 1900 British Columbia election
Party	Candidate	Votes	%	±	Expenditures
Government	George Bizantson	50	6.77%	–	unknown
Government	Donald Fraser	75	10.16%	–	unknown
**Independent Opposition**	**William Henry Hayward**	**272**	**36.86%**		unknown
Independent Opposition	David Williams Higgins	111	15.04%		unknown
Opposition	**Charles Edward Pooley**	**230**	**31.17%**	–	unknown
Total valid votes		738	100.00%		
Total rejected ballots					
Turnout		%			

10th 1903 British Columbia general election ^{4}
Party	Candidate	Votes	%	±	Expenditures
Liberal	John Jardine	212	47.01%		unknown
Conservative	**Charles Edward Pooley**	**239**	**52.99%**		unknown
Total valid votes		451	100.00%		
Total rejected ballots					
Turnout		%			
^{4}Seat was reduced from two members to one.

11th 1907 British Columbia general election
Party	Candidate	Votes	%	±	Expenditures
**Liberal**	**John Jardine**	297	58.58%		unknown
Conservative	Charles Edward Pooley	210	41.42%		unknown
Total valid votes		507	100.00%		
Total rejected ballots					
Turnout		%			

12th 1909 British Columbia general election
Party	Candidate	Votes	%	±	Expenditures
Conservative	Henry Dallas Helmcken	362	45.36%		unknown
**Liberal**	**John Jardine**	**436**	**54.64%**		unknown
Total valid votes		798	100.00%		
Total rejected ballots					
Turnout		%			

13th 1912 British Columbia general election
Party	Candidate	Votes	%	±	Expenditures
Independent Conservative	Henry Dallas Helmcken	186	21.73%		
Liberal	Malcolm Bruce Jackson	151	17.64%		
Independent Conservative	John Jardine	96	11.21%		
Socialist	George Oliver	25	2.92%	–	unknown
Conservative	**Robert Henry Pooley**	**398**	**46.50%**		unknown
Total valid votes		856	100.00%		
Total rejected ballots					
Turnout		%			

14th 1916 British Columbia general election
Party	Candidate	Votes	%	±	Expenditures
Liberal	Arthur William McCurdy	653	49.92%		unknown
Conservative	**Robert Henry Pooley**	**655**	**50.08%**		unknown
Total valid votes		1,308	100.00%		
Total rejected ballots					
Turnout					

15th 1920 British Columbia general election
Party	Candidate	Votes	%	±	Expenditures
Socialist Labour	Burges James Gadsden	479	20.63%		unknown
Liberal	Henry Charles Helgesen	685	29.50%		unknown
Conservative	**Robert Henry Pooley**	**1,158**	**49.87%**		unknown
Total valid votes		2,322	100.00%		
Total rejected ballots					
Turnout		%			

16th 1924 British Columbia general election
Party	Candidate	Votes	%	±	Expenditures
Liberal	Frank Robert Carlow	625	22.64%		
Independent Conservative	Alexander Lockley	341	12.35%		
Provincial	Robert Pope Matheson	515	18.65%		
Conservative	**Robert Henry Pooley**	**1,280**	**46.36%**		
Total valid votes		2,761	100.00%		

17th 1928 British Columbia general election
Party	Candidate	Votes	%	±	Expenditures
Independent Liberal	Frank Robert Carlow^{5}	25	0.86%		
Conservative	**Robert Henry Pooley**	**1,806**	**62.10%**		unknown
Liberal	Mary Ellen Smith ^{6}	1,077	18.65%		unknown
Total valid votes		2,908	100.00%		
Total rejected ballots		92			
Turnout		%			
^{5} Independent in Summary of Votes.
^{6}Mary Ellen Smith was the first female candidate to the BC Legislature.

1933 British Columbia general election
Party	Candidate	Votes	%
Unionist	Robert Henry Pooley	1,466	39.03
Liberal	Charles Eustatius Whitney-Griffiths	1,407	37.46
Co-operative Commonwealth	Arthur Norman Brown	525	13.98
Non-Partisan Independent Group	James Elrick	358	9.53
Total valid votes		3,756	100.00
Total rejected ballots		104	

19th 1937 British Columbia general election
Party	Candidate	Votes	%	±	Expenditures
Independent	John William Archer	67	1.70%		unknown
Social Credit League	Arabella Cicily Boydell	57	1.44%	–	unknown
**Conservative**	**Elmer Victor Finland**	**1,642**	**41.60%**		unknown
Co-operative Commonwealth Fed.	William Donaldson Smith	765	19.38%		unknown
Liberal	Charles Eustatius Whitney-Griffiths	1,416	35.88%		unknown
Total valid votes		3,947	100.00%		
Total rejected ballots		28			
Turnout		%			

20th 1941 British Columbia general election
Party	Candidate	Votes	%	±	Expenditures
Liberal	Charles Taschereau Beard	1,348	35.06%		unknown
**Conservative**	**Elmer Victor Finland**	**1,554**	**40.42%**		unknown
Co-operative Commonwealth Fed.	Henry George Webber	943	24.53%		unknown
Total valid votes		3,845	100.00%		
Total rejected ballots		134			
Turnout		%			

21st 1945 British Columbia general election
Party	Candidate	Votes	%	±	Expenditures
Coalition	**Charles Taschereau Beard**	**2,568**	**56.35%**	–	unknown
Co-operative Commonwealth Fed.	George Henry Webber	1,989	43.65%		unknown
Total valid votes		4,557	100.00%		
Total rejected ballots		114			
Turnout		%			

22nd 1949 British Columbia general election
Party	Candidate	Votes	%	±	Expenditures
Coalition	**Charles Taschereau Beard**	**4,219**	**51.26%**		
Independent	George Edward Bonner	1,554	40.42%		
Independent Conservative	Elmer Victor Finland	943	24.53%		
Union of Electors	Ellen Hart	92	1.12%		
Independent Conservative	Henry George Webber	2,488	30.23%		
Total valid votes		8,231	100.00%		
Total rejected ballots		173			
Turnout		%			

23rd British Columbia election, 1952^{7}
Party	Candidate	Votes 1st count	%	Votes final count	%	±%	
Social Credit League	William Neelands Chant	1,606	17.73%				
Liberal	Geoffrey Indnes Edgelow	2,294	25.33%	3,597	43.14%		unknown
Progressive Conservative	Robert Hamilton Fort	1,550	17.11%	-	%		unknown
**Co-operative Commonwealth Fed.**	**Frank Mitchell**	**3,607**	**39.83%**	**4,741**	**56.86%**		unknown
Total valid votes		9,057	%	8,338	100.00%		
Total rejected ballots		366					
Turnout		%					
^{7} Final count is between top two candidates from previous count; intermediary counts (of 3) not shown

24th British Columbia election, 1953 ^{8}
Party	Candidate	Votes 1st count	%	Votes final count	%	±%	
Social Credit League	**Herbert Joseph Bruch**	**3,264**	**36.96%**	**4,147**	**51.87%**		
Liberal	Geofrey Innes Edgelow	1,998	22.62%	-	%		unknown
Progressive Conservative	Norman L. Goodwin	480	5.44	-	%		unknown
Co-operative Commonwealth Fed.	Frank Mitchell	3,089	34.98%	3,848	48.13%		unknown
Total valid votes		8,831	100.00%	7,995	%		
Total rejected ballots		445					
Total Registered Voters							
Turnout		%					
^{8} Preferential ballot; final count is between top two candidates from first count; intermediary counts (of 3) not shown

25th 1956 British Columbia general election
Party	Candidate	Votes	%	±	Expenditures
Social Credit	**Herbert Joseph Bruch**	**3,530**	**43.70**		
Progressive Conservative	Brock Chisholm	821	10.16%		unknown
Co-operative Commonwealth Fed.	Elvan Walters	2,013	24.92%		unknown
Liberal	George Wilfrid Whittaker	1,714	21.22%		unknown
Total valid votes		8,078	100.00%		
Total rejected ballots		110			
Turnout		%			

26th 1960 British Columbia general election
Party	Candidate	Votes	%	±	Expenditures
Social Credit	**Herbert Joseph Bruch**	**4,429**	**40.38%**		
Progressive Conservative	James Bryant	991	9.04%		unknown
Co-operative Commonwealth Fed.	Geoffrey Harris Mitchell	3.383	30.84%		unknown
Liberal	George Wilfrid Whittaker	2,165	19.74%		unknown
Total valid votes		10,968	100.00%		
Total rejected ballots		126			
Turnout		%			

27th 1963 British Columbia general election
Party	Candidate	Votes	%	±	Expenditures
Social Credit	**Herbert Joseph Bruch**	**4,951**	**48.28%**		
New Democratic	Geoffrey Harris Mitchell	2,806	27.36%		unknown
Liberal	Maurice Charles Simard	1,398	13.63%		unknown
Progressive Conservative	Robin James Dunsmuir	1099	10.72%		unknown
Total valid votes		10,254	100.00%		
Total rejected ballots		121			
Turnout		%			

28th 1966 British Columbia general election
Party	Candidate	Votes	%	±	Expenditures
New Democratic	John E. Bartanus	3,445	30.25%		unknown
Social Credit	**Herbert Joseph Bruch**	**6,075**	**53.35%**		
Liberal	David Alexander Elrix	1,867	16.40%		unknown
Total valid votes		11,387	100.00%		
Total rejected ballots		285			
Turnout		%			

29th 1969 British Columbia general election
Party	Candidate	Votes	%	±	Expenditures
Social Credit	**Herbert Joseph Bruch**	**8,532**	**52.60%**		
New Democratic	James Henry Gorst	5,718	35.25%		unknown
Liberal	Frederick Henry Phillips	1,971	12.15%		unknown
Total valid votes		16,221	100.00%		
Total rejected ballots		415			
Turnout		%			

30th 1972 British Columbia general election
Party	Candidate	Votes	%	±	Expenditures
Social Credit	Herbert Joseph Bruch	5,320	27.46%		
New Democratic	**James Henry Gorst**	**6,568**	**33.90%**		unknown
Liberal	Henry Donovan Joy	3,884	20.05%		unknown
Progressive Conservative	John Sedgwick Williams	3,601	18.59%		unknown
Total valid votes		19,373	100.00%		
Total rejected ballots		453			
Turnout		%			

31st 1975 British Columbia general election
Party	Candidate	Votes	%	±	Expenditures
Independent	John Strong Craggs	132	0.54%		unknown
Progressive Conservative	Thelma Dawson	2,033	8.37%		unknown
Social Credit	**Lyle Benjamin James Kahl**	**10,637**	**43.78%**		
New Democratic	Franklin John Trehern Mitchell	10,516	43.28%		unknown
Liberal	Leonard J. Stephenson	977	4.02%		unknown
Total valid votes		24,295	100.00%		
Total rejected ballots		417			
Turnout		%			

== Subsequent elections ==
After the 32nd general election in 1979, the riding of Esquimalt was incorporated into the new riding of Esquimalt-Port Renfrew.

== Sources ==
- Elections BC website - historical election data
