= Legislative Assembly of British Columbia =

Provincial legislature in Canada

Coordinates: 48°25′10″N 123°22′13″W

- 44th Parliament of British Columbia

Type
- Type: Unicameral house of the Legislature of British Columbia
- Sovereign: The lieutenant governor (representing the King of Canada)

History
- Founded: July 20, 1871
- Preceded by: Legislative Council

Leadership
- Speaker: Teresa Wat, Conservative since November 20, 2026
- Premier: Lorne Doerkson, Conservative since November 20, 2026
- Leader of the Opposition: Jennifer Whiteside, NDP since November 20, 2026
- Government House leader: Trevor Halford, Conservative since November 20, 2026
- Opposition House leader: Vacant, TBD since September 22, 2026

Structure
- Seats: 93
- Political groups: His Majesty's Government: Conservative (64); His Majesty's Loyal Opposition: New Democratic (27); Parties with official status: Green (2)

Elections
- Last election: October 24, 2026
- Next election: On or before October 19, 2030

Meeting place
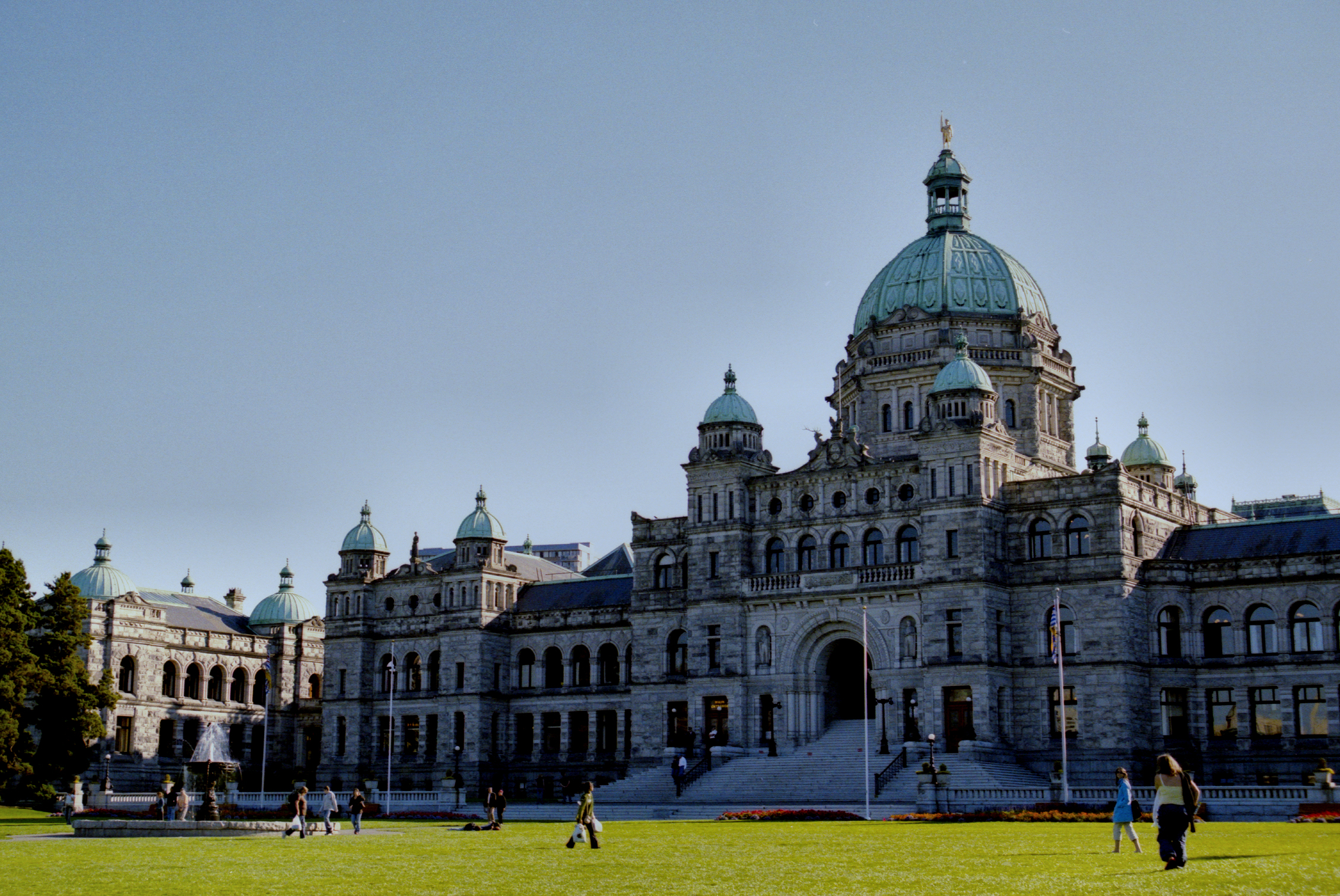
- Parliament Buildings, Victoria, British Columbia, Canada

Website
- www.leg.bc.ca

The Legislative Assembly of British Columbia (French: Assemblée législative de la Colombie-Britannique) is the deliberative assembly of the Legislature of British Columbia, in the province of British Columbia, Canada. The legislature also includes the lieutenant governor of British Columbia. The assembly has 93 elected members and meets in Victoria. Members are elected from provincial ridings and are referred to as members of the Legislative Assembly (MLAs). Bills passed by the assembly are given royal assent by the lieutenant governor in the name of the King of Canada.

The current legislature is the 44th Parliament. The most recent general election was held on October 24, 2026.

== Location ==
From 1856 to 1860, the Legislature of the Colony of Vancouver Island met at Bachelor's Hall at Fort Victoria. From 1860 to 1898 it was housed in the first permanent building at Legislative Hall or Legislative Council Court, a two-storey wooden building along with four other buildings (Land Office, Colonial Office, Supreme Court, and Treasury) known colloquially as "The Birdcages" because of their shape (burned 1957). Since 1898, the legislature has been located in the British Columbia Parliament Buildings, which features a 150-metre-long facade (500 ft), central dome, two end pavilions, and a gilded statue of George Vancouver.

== Parliaments ==
Parliament	Period		Government Premier of British Columbia		Opposition Leader of the Opposition	
Parliament	Start	End	Party	Name	Party	Name
1st 1871 election	1871	1875	None	John Foster McCreight; Amor De Cosmos; George Anthony Walkem	None	None
2nd 1875 election	1876	1878	None	George Anthony Walkem; Andrew Charles Elliott	None	None
3rd 1878 election	1878	1882	None	George Anthony Walkem; Robert Beaven	None	None
4th 1882 election	1883	1886	None	Robert Beaven; William Smithe	None	None
5th 1886 election	1887	1890	None	William Smithe; Alexander Edmund Batson Davie; John Robson	None	None
6th 1890 election	1891	1894	None	John Robson; Theodore Davie	None	None
7th 1894 election	1894	1898	None	Theodore Davie; John Herbert Turner	None	None
8th 1898 election	1899	1900	None	John Herbert Turner; Charles Augustus Semlin; Joseph Martin	None	None
9th 1900 election	1900	1903	None	James Dunsmuir; Edward Gawler Prior; Richard McBride	None	None
10th 1903 election	1903	1906	Conservative	Richard McBride	Liberal	James Alexander MacDonald
11th 1907 election	1907	1909	Conservative	Richard McBride	Liberal	James Alexander MacDonald
12th 1909 election	1910	1912	Conservative	Richard McBride	Socialist	James Hawthornthwaite
12th 1909 election	1910	1912	Conservative	Richard McBride	Liberal	Harlan Carey Brewster
13th 1912 election	1913	1916	Conservative	Richard McBride; William John Bowser	Socialist	Parker Williams
13th 1912 election	1913	1916	Conservative	Richard McBride; William John Bowser	Liberal	Harlan Carey Brewster
14th 1916 election	1917	1920	Liberal	Harlan Carey Brewster; John Oliver	Conservative	William John Bowser
15th 1920 election	1921	1924	Liberal	John Oliver	Conservative	William John Bowser
16th 1924 election	1924	1928	Liberal	John Oliver; John Duncan MacLean	Conservative	Robert Henry Pooley
17th 1928 election	1929	1933	Conservative	Simon Fraser Tolmie	Liberal	Duff Pattullo
18th 1933 election	1934	1937	Liberal	Duff Pattullo	CCF	Robert Connell
18th 1933 election	1934	1937	Liberal	Duff Pattullo	Social Constructive	Robert Connell
19th 1937 election	1937	1941	Liberal	Duff Pattullo	Conservative	Frank Porter Patterson; Royal Maitland
20th 1941 election	1941	1945	Liberal–Conservative coalition	John Hart	CCF	Harold Winch
21st 1945 election	1946	1949	Liberal–Progressive Conservative coalition	John Hart; Boss Johnson	CCF	Harold Winch
22nd 1949 election	1950	1952	Liberal–Progressive Conservative coalition	Boss Johnson	CCF	Harold Winch
22nd 1949 election	1950	1952	Liberal	Boss Johnson	Progressive Conservative	Herbert Anscomb
23rd 1952 election	1953	1953	Social Credit	W. A. C. Bennett	CCF	Harold Winch
24th 1953 election	1953	1956	Social Credit	W. A. C. Bennett	CCF	Arnold Webster
25th 1956 election	1957	1960	Social Credit	W. A. C. Bennett	CCF	Robert Strachan
26th 1960 election	1961	1963	Social Credit	W. A. C. Bennett	CCF	Robert Strachan
27th 1963 election	1964	1966	Social Credit	W. A. C. Bennett	NDP	Robert Strachan
28th 1966 election	1967	1969	Social Credit	W. A. C. Bennett	NDP	Robert Strachan
29th 1969 election	1970	1972	Social Credit	W. A. C. Bennett	NDP	Dave Barrett
30th 1972 election	1972	1975	New Democratic	Dave Barrett	Social Credit	W. A. C. Bennett; Frank Richter Jr.; Bill Bennett
31st 1975 election	1976	1979	Social Credit	Bill Bennett	NDP	Bill King; Dave Barrett
32nd 1979 election	1979	1983	Social Credit	Bill Bennett	NDP	Dave Barrett
33rd 1983 election	1983	1986	Social Credit	Bill Bennett; Bill Vander Zalm	NDP	Dave Barrett; Bob Skelly
34th 1986 election	1987	1991	Social Credit	Bill Vander Zalm; Rita Johnston	NDP	Bob Skelly; Mike Harcourt
35th 1991 election	1992	1996	New Democratic	Mike Harcourt; Glen Clark	Liberal	Gordon Wilson; Fred Gingell; Gordon Campbell
36th 1996 election	1996	2001	New Democratic	Glen Clark; Dan Miller; Ujjal Dosanjh	Liberal	Gordon Campbell
37th 2001 election	2001	2005	Liberal	Gordon Campbell	NDP	Joy MacPhail
38th 2005 election	2005	2009	Liberal	Gordon Campbell	NDP	Carole James
39th 2009 election	2009	2013	Liberal	Gordon Campbell; Christy Clark	NDP	Carole James; Dawn Black; Adrian Dix
40th 2013 election	2013	2017	Liberal	Christy Clark	NDP	Adrian Dix; John Horgan
41st 2017 election	2017	2020	Liberal	Christy Clark	NDP	John Horgan
41st 2017 election	2017	2020	New Democratic	John Horgan	Liberal	Christy Clark; Rich Coleman; Andrew Wilkinson
42nd 2020 election	2020	2024	New Democratic	John Horgan; David Eby	Liberal	Shirley Bond
42nd 2020 election	2020	2024	New Democratic	John Horgan; David Eby	United	Kevin Falcon
43rd 2024 election	2025	2026	New Democratic	David Eby	Conservative	John Rustad; Trevor Halford; Heather Maahs; Lorne Doerkson
44th 2026 election	2026	Incumbent	Conservative	Lorne Doerkson	New Democratic	Jennifer Whiteside

== Presiding officers and parliamentary leaders ==
As of November 2026:

=== Speaker ===
- Speaker of the Legislative Assembly of British Columbia: Teresa Wat (Conservative)

=== Other chair occupants ===
- Deputy speaker; chair, Committee of the Whole: TBD
- Assistant deputy speaker: TBD

=== Leaders ===
- Premier of British Columbia: Lorne Doerkson (Conservative)
- Leader of the Opposition: Jennifer Whiteside (New Democratic)
- Third party leader: Emily Lowan (Green)

==== House leaders ====
- Government House leader: Trevor Halford (Conservative)
- Opposition House leader: TBD (New Democratic)
- Third party House leader: TBD (Green)

=== Whips ===
- Chief government whip: Macklin McCall (Conservative)
  - Deputy government whip: Jaime Stein (Conservative)
- Official Opposition whip: TBD (New Democratic)

== Hansard TV ==
Hansard TV (also known as Hansard Broadcasting Services) is the official television network of the assembly. It is available on the vast majority of cable systems province-wide, nationally on satellite services, and on the Legislative Assembly's website and its YouTube channel. The brand name of "Hansard" refers to printed transcripts of parliamentary debates in the Westminster system government. Hansard TV also manages the operation of the Saskatchewan Legislative Network, the broadcaster for the Legislative Assembly of Saskatchewan. Hansard TV's broadcasts are available with closed captioning, with live sessions available with Canadian Sign Language interpretation on-screen.

=== History ===
Premier Bill Vander Zalm had promised to introduce television cameras into the BC Legislature in 1986, but high costs had delayed the implementation of such a service. As a result, the plans were redrawn to cut the costs from $6 million to $2 million. Even though that system was not yet in service, temporary manual-operated coverage debuted on March 11, 1991, with five camera positions, when the legislature was recalled. The permanent facility was completed by March 1992, for the opening of the 35th Parliament. The broadcasts were uplinked to the Anik E2 satellite for distribution by cable television companies throughout the province.

== Gallery ==
Photos of the Legislative Assembly of British Columbia
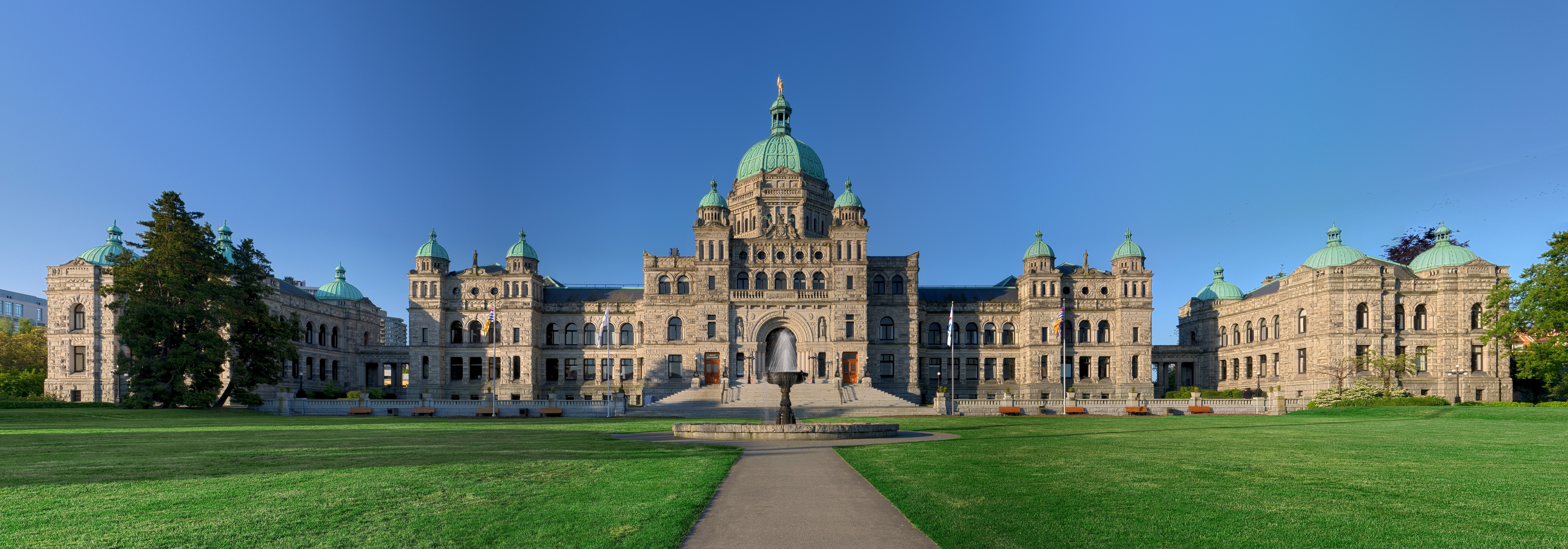
The British Columbia Parliament Buildings

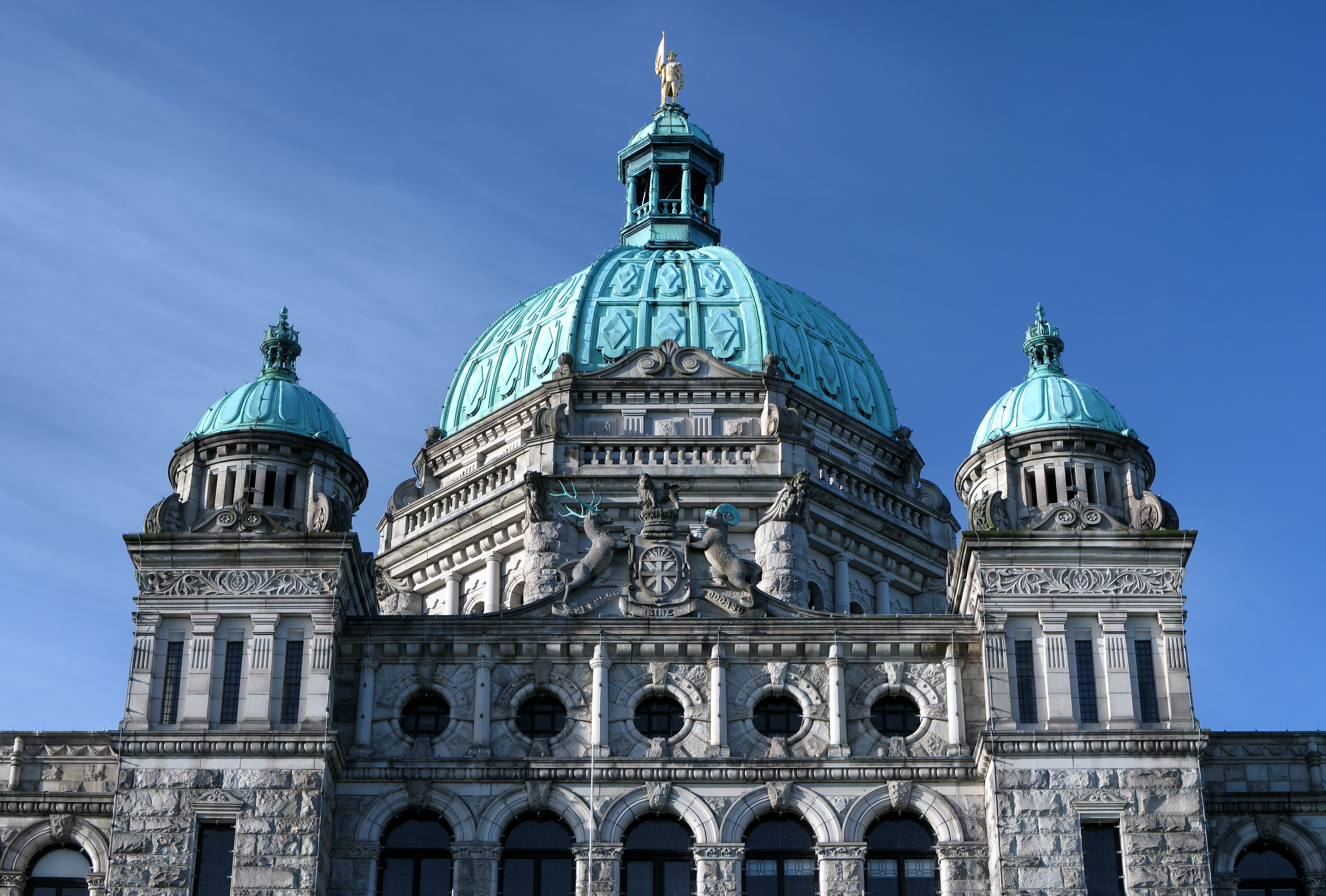
The Parliament Buildings roof with a gilded statue of George Vancouver

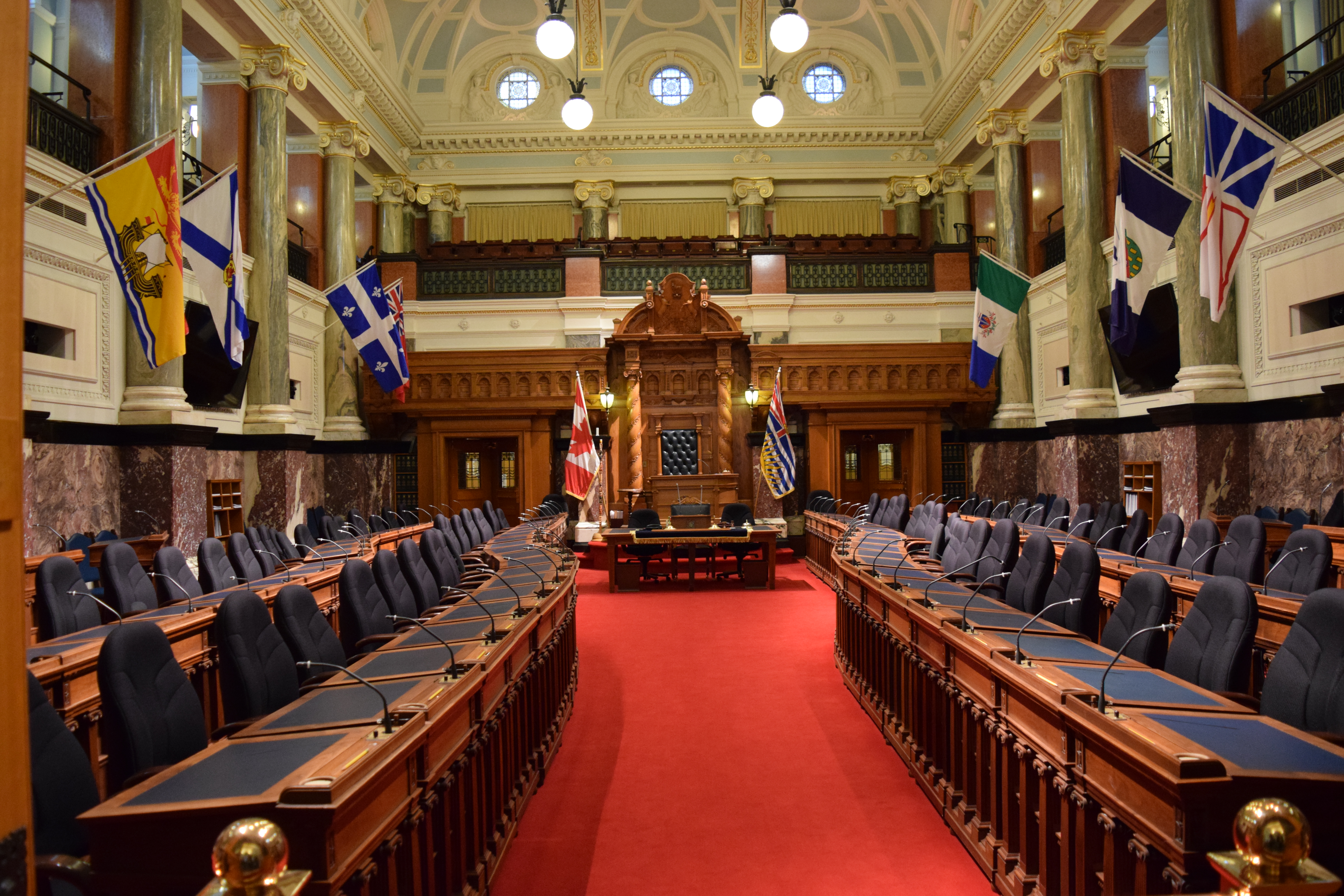
The Legislative Chamber

== See also ==
- Executive Council of British Columbia
- Legislative Council of British Columbia
- List of British Columbia provincial electoral districts (2001–2009)
- British Columbia Legislature raids
