= 3rd Parliament of British Columbia =

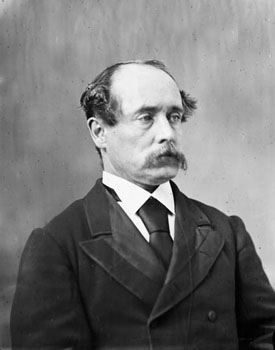
George Anthony Walkem

The 3rd Legislative Assembly of British Columbia sat from 1878 to 1882. The members were elected in the British Columbia general election held in May 1878. George Anthony Walkem was asked to form a government. Robert Beaven succeeded Walkem as premier in June 1882.

There were five sessions of the 3rd Legislature:

Session	Start	End
1st	July 29, 1878	September 2, 1878
2nd	January 29, 1879	April 29, 1879
3rd	April 5, 1880	May 8, 1880
4th	January 24, 1881	March 23, 1881
5th	February 23, 1882	April 21, 1882

Frederick W. Williams served as speaker.

== Members of the 3rd Parliament ==
The following members were elected to the assembly in 1878:

Member	Electoral district	Party	First elected / previously elected	No.# of term(s)
George Cowan	Cariboo	Opposition (Note: opposed to the Elliott administration)	1877	2nd term
John Evans	Cariboo	Opposition	1875	2nd term
George Anthony Boomer Walken	Cariboo	Opposition	1871	3rd term
George Ferguson (1879)	Cariboo	Independent	1879	1st term
John Ash	Comox	Opposition	1871	3rd term
Edwin Pimbury	Cowichan	Government (Note: Government candidate supporting the Elliott administration)	1875	2nd term
William Smithe	Cowichan	Government	1871	3rd term
Hans Lars Helgesen	Esquimalt	Opposition	1878	1st term
Frederick W. Williams	Esquimalt	Opposition	1875	2nd term
Robert Leslie Thomas Galbraith	Kootenay	Opposition?	1877	2nd term
Charles Gallagher	Kootenay	Opposition?	1875	2nd term
William M. Brown	Lillooet	Opposition	1874	3rd term
William Saul	Lillooet	Opposition	1872, 1878	2nd term*
James Atkinson Abrams	Nanaimo	Opposition	1878	1st term
Wellington John Harris	New Westminster	Government	1878	1st term
Donald McGillivray	New Westminster	Government	1878	1st term
Ebenezer Brown	New Westminster City	Government	1875	2nd term
William James Armstrong (1881)	New Westminster City	Independent	1871, 1881	3rd term*
Thomas Basil Humphreys	Victoria District	Opposition	1871	3rd term
James Thomas McIlmoyl	Victoria District	Opposition	1878	1st term
Robert Beaven	Victoria City	Government	1871	3rd term
James Smith Drummond	Victoria City	Opposition	1878	1st term
John William Williams	Victoria City	Opposition	1878	1st term
William Wilson	Victoria City	Opposition	1878	1st term
Preston Bennett	Yale	Government	1878	1st term
John Andrew Mara	Yale	Government	1871	3rd term
Forbes George Vernon	Yale	Government	1875	2nd term

== By-elections ==
By-elections were held for the following members appointed to the provincial cabinet, as was required at the time. All elections were won by acclamation:

- Thomas Basil Humphreys, Provincial Secretary and Minister of Mines, acclaimed July 10, 1878
- Robert Beaven, Minister of Finance and Agriculture, acclaimed July 10, 1878
- George Anthony Boomer Walkem Premier, acclaimed August 3, 1878

By-elections were held to replace members for various other reasons:

Electoral district	Member elected	Election date	Reason
Cariboo	George Ferguson	October 25, 1879	death of J. Evans on August 25, 1879
New Westminster City	William James Armstrong	December 20, 1881 (Note: acclaimed)	E. Brown retired due to ill health

== Other changes ==
- Cariboo (res. George Anthony Boomer Walkem 1882)
