= 2nd Parliament of British Columbia =

Canadian parliament term

The 2nd Legislative Assembly of British Columbia sat from 1875 to 1878. The members were elected in the British Columbia general election held in September and October 1875. The government of George Anthony Walkem was defeated on a confidence motion on January 25, 1876, and Andrew Charles Elliott was asked to form a new government. On March 29, 1878, a government bill to redistribute the seats in the legislature was defeated and the assembly was dissolved on April 12, 1878.

There were three sessions of the 2nd Legislature:

| Session | Start | End |
|---|---|---|
| 1st | January 10, 1876 | May 19, 1877 |
| 2nd | February 21, 1877 | April 18, 1877 |
| 3rd | February 7, 1878 | April 10, 1878 |

James Trimble served as speaker.

== Members of the 2nd Parliament ==
The following members were elected to the assembly in 1875

| Member | Electoral district | Party | First elected | No.# of term(s) |
|---|---|---|---|---|
| George Anthony Boomer Walken | Cariboo | Government (Note: Government candidates supported the Walkem administration) | 1871 | 2nd term |
| Alexander Edmund Batson Davie | Cariboo | Independent Opposition (Note: opposed to the Walkem administration) | 1875 | 1st term |
| John Evans | Cariboo | Independent Opposition | 1875 | 1st term |
| George Cowan (1877) | Cariboo | Opposition | 1877 | 1st term |
| John Ash | Comox | Government | 1871 | 2nd term |
| William Smithe | Cowichan | Reform | 1871 | 2nd term |
| Edwin Pimbury | Cowichan | Reform | 1875 | 1st term |
| William Fisher | Esquimalt | Independent | 1875 | 1st term |
| Frederick W. Williams | Esquimalt | Reform | 1875 | 1st term |
| Charles Gallagher | Kootenay | Reform | 1875 | 1st term |
| Arthur Wellesley Vowell | Kootenay | Reform | 1875 | 1st term |
| William Cosgrove Milby (1876) | Kootenay | Government | 1876 | 1st term |
| Robert Leslie Thomas Galbraith (1877) | Kootenay | Opposition | 1877 | 1st term |
| William M. Brown | Lillooet | Reform | 1874 | 2nd term |
| William Morrison | Lillooet | Reform | 1875 | 1st term |
| John Bryden | Nanaimo | Reform | 1875 | 1st term |
| David William Gordon (1877) | Nanaimo | Independent Government | 1877 | 1st term |
| William James Armstrong | New Westminster | Government | 1871 | 2nd term |
| Ebenezer Brown | New Westminster | Independent Government (Note: Independent candidate identified as supporting the Walkem administration) | 1875 | 1st term |
| Robert Dickinson | New Westminster City | Independent Government | 1875 | 1st term |
| Thomas Basil Humphreys | Victoria District | Reform | 1871 | 2nd term |
| William Fraser Tolmie | Victoria District | Reform | 1874 | 2nd term |
| Robert Beaven | Victoria City | Government | 1871 | 2nd term |
| James W. Douglas | Victoria City | Independent? | 1875 | 1st term |
| Andrew Charles Elliott | Victoria City | Opposition | 1875 | 1st term |
| James Trimble | Victoria City | Independent Government | 1871 | 2nd term |
| John Andrew Mara | Yale | Reform | 1871 | 2nd term |
| Robert Smith | Yale | Independent Government | 1871 | 2nd term |
| Forbes George Vernon | Yale | Reform | 1875 | 1st term |

== By-elections ==
By-elections were held for the following members appointed to the provincial cabinet, as was required at the time:

- Thomas Basil Humphreys, Minister of Finance and Agriculture, acclaimed February 15, 1876
- Andrew Charles Elliott, Premier, elected February 22, 1876
- Forbes George Vernon, Commissioner of Lands and Works, elected March 11, 1876
- William Smithe, Minister of Finance and Agriculture, acclaimed August 14, 1876
- Alexander Edmund Batson Davie, Provincial Secretary, defeated by George Cowan on June 20, 1877

By-elections were held to replace members for various other reasons:

| Electoral district | Member elected | Election date | Reason |
|---|---|---|---|
| Kootenay | William Cosgrove Milby | August 24, 1876 | A.W. Vowell named Gold Commissioner for Cassiar |
| Nanaimo | David William Gordon | January 19, 1877 | J. Bryden resigned his seat to look after his business interests |
| Kootenay | Robert Leslie Thomas Galbraith | December 20, 1877 | death of W.C. Milby on October 26, 1877 |
