= 1st Parliament of British Columbia =

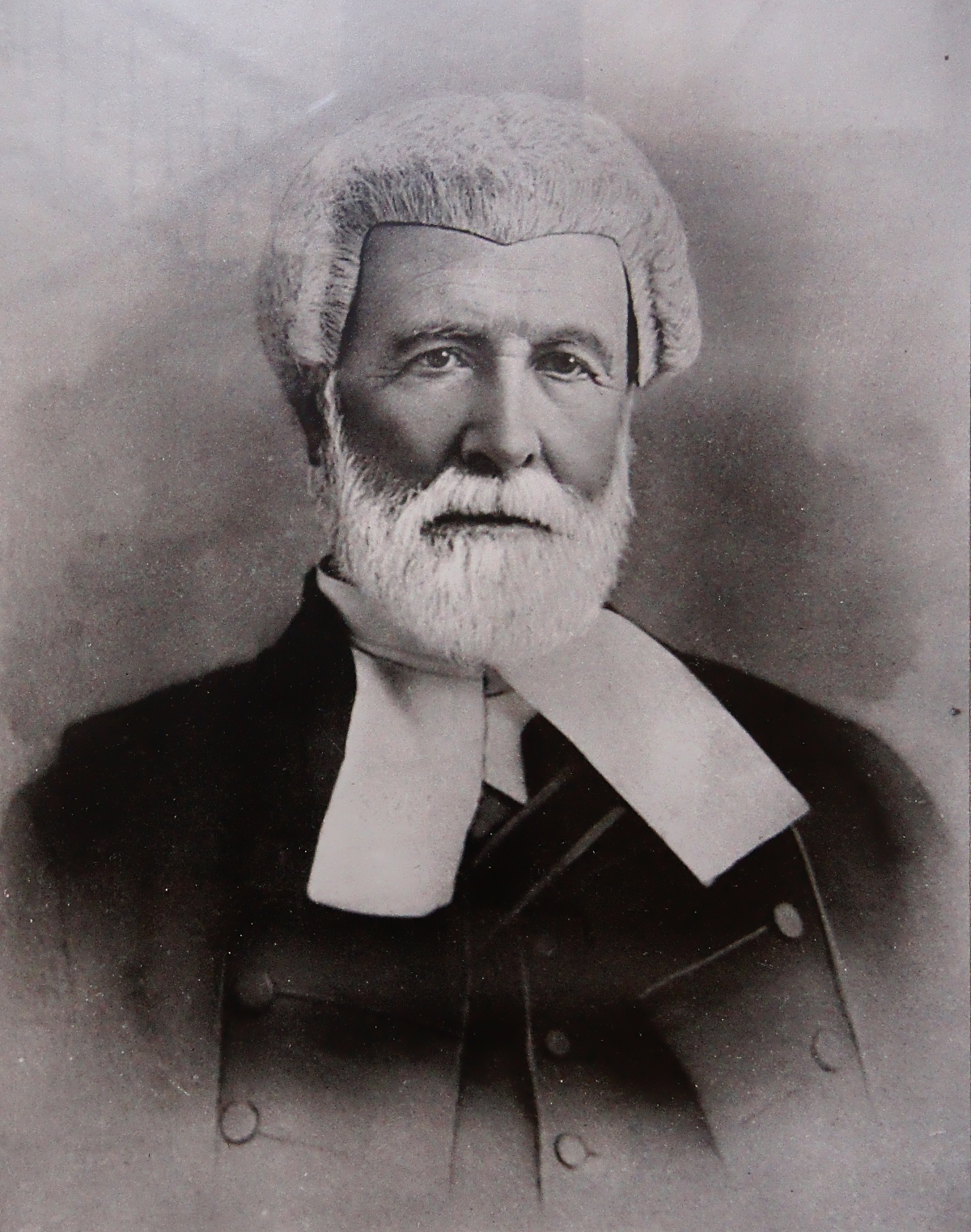
John Foster McCreight, premier of British Columbia 1871-1872.

The 1st Legislative Assembly of British Columbia sat from 1871 to 1875. The members were elected in the British Columbia general election held in October 1871. John Foster McCreight was called upon to form a cabinet. In December 1872, the government was defeated on a confidence motion and Amor De Cosmos subsequently formed a new cabinet. After De Cosmos was elected to the House of Commons in February 1874, George A. Walken became premier.

There were four sessions of the 1st Legislature:

Session	Start	End
1st	February 15, 1872	April 11, 1872
2nd	December 17, 1872	February 21, 1873
3rd	December 18, 1873	March 2, 1874
4th	March 1, 1875	April 22, 1875

James Trimble served as speaker.

== Members of the 1st Parliament ==
The following members were elected to the assembly in 1871:

Member	Electoral district	First elected	No.# of term(s)
George A. Walkem	Cariboo	1871	1st term
Joseph Hunter	Cariboo	1871	1st term
Cornelius Booth	Cariboo	1871	1st term
John George Barnston (1872)	Cariboo	1872	1st term
John Ash	Comox	1871	1st term
William Smithe	Cowichan	1871	1st term
John Paton Booth	Cowichan	1871	1st term
A. Rocke Robertson	Esquimalt	1871	1st term
Henry Cogan	Esquimalt	1871	1st term
John Andrew Mara	Kootenay	1871	1st term
Charles Todd	Kootenay	1871	1st term
Andrew T. Jamieson	Lillooet	1871	1st term
T. B. Humphreys	Lillooet	1871	1st term
William Saul (1872)	Lillooet	1872	1st term
William M. Brown (1874)	Lillooet	1874	1st term
John Robson	Nanaimo	1871	1st term
Henry Holbrook	New Westminster City	1871	1st term
Josiah Charles Hughes	New Westminster District	1871	1st term
William Armstrong	New Westminster District	1871	1st term
Robert Beaven	Victoria City	1871	1st term
John Foster McCreight	Victoria City	1871	1st term
Simeon Duck	Victoria City	1871	1st term
James Trimble	Victoria City	1871	1st term
Amor De Cosmos	Victoria District	1871	1st term
Arthur Bunster	Victoria District	1871	1st term
William Archibald Robertson (1874)	Victoria District	1874	1st term
William Fraser Tolmie (1874)	Victoria District	1874	1st term
Robert Smith	Yale	1871	1st term
James Robinson	Yale	1871	1st term
Charles A. Semlin	Yale	1871	1st term

== By-elections ==
By-elections were held for the following members appointed to the provincial cabinet, as was required at the time. All cabinet members were re-elected by acclamation:

- A. Rocke Robertson, Provincial Secretary, acclaimed November 28, 1871
- Henry Holbrook, Chief Commissioner of Lands and Works, acclaimed November 28, 1871
- George A. Walkem, Minister of Finance, acclaimed February 23, 1872
- John Ash, Provincial Secretary, acclaimed January 11, 1873
- Robert Beaven, Chief Commissioner of Lands and Works, acclaimed January 6, 1873
- William Armstrong, Minister of Finance and Agriculture, acclaimed March 21, 1873

By-elections were held to replace members for various other reasons:

Electoral district	Member elected	Election date	Reason
Cariboo	John George Barnston	June 22, 1872	C. Booth appointed judge
Lillooet	William Saul	December 21, 1872	Death of A.T. Jamieson in October 1872
Victoria District	William Archibald Robertson	February 26, 1874	A. Bunster and A. de Cosmos elected to federal seats
Victoria District	William Fraser Tolmie	February 26, 1874	A. Bunster and A. de Cosmos elected to federal seats
Lillooet	Thomas Basil Humphreys	November 17, 1874	both members resigned in a "dispute between the two gentlemen as to which represents the popular feeling of the district"
Lillooet	William M. Brown	November 17, 1874	both members resigned in a "dispute between the two gentlemen as to which represents the popular feeling of the district"
