= 1871 British Columbia general election =

Canadian provincial election

- 1871

25 seats in the Legislative Assembly of British Columbia
Premier before election
John Foster McCreight
Government
Premier after election
John Foster McCreight
Government

The 1871 British Columbia general election was held from October to December 1871. Formerly a British colony, British Columbia became a province of Canada on July 20, 1871. An interim Cabinet was appointed by the lieutenant governor of British Columbia and election writs for the first general election as a province of Canada were issued to choose 25 members of the first provincial legislature from 12 ridings (electoral districts). These ridings were:

- Cariboo (three members)
- Comox (one member)
- Cowichan (two members)
- Esquimalt (two members)
- Kootenay (two members)
- Lillooet (two members)
- Nanaimo (one member)
- New Westminster (two members)
- New Westminster City (one member)
- Victoria (two members)
- Victoria City (four members)
- Yale (three members)

== Polling conditions ==
The election was held from October through December 1871, and was conducted by means of a show of hands on nomination day and, if required, an open poll book on polling day. There were no organized political parties.

Each voter could cast as many votes as there were seats to fill. Where multiple members were elected, the seats were filled through plurality block voting; elsewhere, first-past-the-post voting was used.

== Statistics ==
- Votes: 3,804
- Candidates: 46
- Members: 25

Vancouver Island

- Upper Island 310 votes, four seats (77.5 votes/seat)
  - Comox: 24 votes (24 votes/seat)
  - Cowichan: 196 votes (2 seats 98 votes/seat 49 voters/seat)
  - Nanaimo: 90 votes (90 votes/seat)
- "Greater Victoria" 2,074 votes, eight seats (259.25 votes/seat):
  - Victoria: 377 votes (2 seats 188.5 votes/seat 94.25 voters/seat)
  - Victoria City: 1,515 (4 seats 378.75 votes/seat 169.3525 voters/seat)
  - Esquimalt: 182 (2 seats 91 votes/seat 45.5 voters/seat)

Mainland:

- Interior 1,907 votes, ten seats (190.7 votes/seat):
  - Cariboo: 785 votes (3 seats 261.67 votes/seat)
  - Kootenay: 39 votes (2 seats 19.5 votes/seat)
  - Lillooet: 102 votes (2 seats 51 votes/seat
  - Yale: 171 votes (3 seats 57 votes/seat)
- Lower Mainland 686 votes (3 seats 228.67 votes/seat:
  - New Westminster: 323 votes (2 seats 161.5 votes/seat)
  - New Westminster City: unknown at this time (vote was by acclamation)_

Note that these figures refer to votes actually cast, not the population per se nor the total of the potential voters' list.

== Results by riding ==
Note: There is no arrangement to the ridings and members, other than by rough alphabetical order, as all were technically independents. Actual seating of the House or political alignments are not represented.

Results of British Columbia general election, 1871
| Government | | Opposition | |
| Member | Riding & party | Riding & party | Member |
|---|---|---|---|
| Cornelius Booth | Cariboo | Comox | John Ash |
| Joseph Hunter | Cariboo | Cowichan | John Paton Booth |
| George Anthony Boomer Walkem^{1} | Cariboo | Cowichan | William Smithe |
| Henry Cogan | Esquimalt | Kootenay | John Andrew Mara |
| Alexander Rocke Robertson | Esquimalt | Kootenay | Charles Todd |
| Thomas Basil Humphreys | Lillooet | Nanaimo | John Robson |
| Andrew Thomas Jamieson | Lillooet | New Westminster | William James Armstrong |
| Henry Holbrook | New Westminster City | New Westminster | Josiah Charles Hughes |
| Arthur Bunster | Victoria | Victoria City | Robert Beaven |
| Amor De Cosmos | Victoria | Victoria City | Simeon Duck |
| James Robinson | Yale | Victoria City | John Foster McCreight^{2} |
| Charles Augustus Semlin | Yale | Victoria City | James Trimble |
| Robert Smith | Yale | | |
| ^{1} Premier-Elect | | | ^{2} Incumbent premier |
Source: Elections BC

== Byelections ==
Two sets of byelections were held to confirm appointments to the Executive Council (cabinet), as was the custom in earlier times. Ministerial candidates in this series of byelections were all confirmed by acclamation (so there were no actual polling dates). These byelections were:

- Esquimalt – Alexander Rocke Robertson, acclaimed November 28, 1871
- New Westminster City – Henry Holbrook acclaimed November 28, 1871
- Cariboo – George Anthony Boomer Walkem acclaimed February 23, 1872
- Comox – John Ash acclaimed, January 11, 1873
- Victoria City – Robert Beaven acclaimed January 6, 1873
- New Westminster – William James Armstrong acclaimed March 21, 1873

Other byelections were also held due to deaths and other appointments; all were contested:

- Cariboo – John George Barnston was elected to replace Cornelius Booth who was appointed to be Clerk of the Bench (provincial court) for the district of Kootenay on April 19, 1872
- Lillooet – William Saul was elected December 21, 1872, to replace Andrew Thomas Jamieson, who had died on October 31, 1872
- Victoria – November 26, 1874. The byelection was due to resignations February 9, 1874, of A. Bunster and Amor De Cosmos upon winning seats in the federal election January 22, 1874 (in Vancouver and Victoria federal ridings, respectively). William Archibald Robertson and William Fraser Tolmie won the vacant seats.
- Lillooet – November 17, 1874. On September 26, 1874, MLAs William Saul and Thomas Basil Humphreys jointly resigned "over a dispute between the two gentlemen as to which represents the popular feeling of the district" (Victoria Colonist September 29, 1874). Humphreys was re-elected and William M. Brown was elected to replace William Saul in a tight three-way race.

== Composition of House at dissolution ==
Note: Government/Opposition status applies to candidate at time of election in 1871, not at time of dissolution in 1875.

Composition of 2nd British Columbia Parliament at Dissolution, 1875
| Government | | Opposition | |
| Member | Riding & party | Riding & party | Member |
|---|---|---|---|
| John George Barnston | Cariboo | Comox | John Ash |
| Joseph Hunter | Cariboo | Cowichan | John Paton Booth |
| George Anthony Boomer Walkem | Cariboo | Cowichan | William Smithe |
| Henry Cogan | Esquimalt | Kootenay | John Andrew Mara |
| Alexander Rocke Robertson | Esquimalt | Kootenay | Charles Todd |
| Thomas Basil Humphreys | Lillooet | Nanaimo | John Robson |
| William M. Brown | Lillooet | New Westminster | William James Armstrong |
| Henry Holbrook | New Westminster City | New Westminster | Josiah Charles Hughes |
| William Archibald Robertson | Victoria | Victoria City | Robert Beaven |
| William Fraser Tolmie | Victoria | Victoria City | Simeon Duck |
| James Robinson | Yale | Victoria City | John Foster McCreight |
| Charles Augustus Semlin | Yale | Victoria City | James Trimble |
| Robert Smith | Yale | | |
Source: Elections BC

== See also ==
- 1st Parliament of British Columbia
- McCreight ministry
- 1871 British Columbia federal by-elections
