= 1875 British Columbia general election =

Canadian provincial election

- 1875

25 seats in the Legislative Assembly of British Columbia
Premier before election
George Anthony Walkem
Government
Premier after election
George Anthony Walkem
Government

The 1875 British Columbia general election was held in 1875. Many of the politicians in the House had served with the Legislative Council or Assembly or the Executive Council, or had otherwise been stalwarts of the colonial era - some supporters of Confederation, others not. Some were ranchers or mining bosses from the Interior, others were colonial gentry from the Island and New Westminster, and others direct arrivals from Britain, Ireland or "Canada", which was still considered a different place not only in the minds of the politicians but in the language used in Hansard during this period.

== Statistics ==
Votes 5,656 Candidates 55 Members 25

Vancouver Island 4,477 votes total elected thirteen seats in six districts. average of 344 votes per seat:

- Upper Island
  - Comox: 83 votes (83 votes/seat)
  - Cowichan: 143 votes (2 seats 71.5 votes/seat)
  - Nanaimo: 770 (2 seats 385 votes/seat)
- "Greater Victoria" total incl. Esquimalt is 3,481 eight seats 435.13 per seat)
  - Victoria: 389 votes (2 seats 194.5 votes/seat)
  - Victoria City: 2,811 (4 seats 702.75 votes/seat)
  - Esquimalt: 281 (2 seats 140.5 votes/seat)

Mainland:

- Interior 1,748 votes (10 seats 174.8 votes/seat:
  - Cariboo: 852 votes (3 seats 284 votes/seat)
  - Kootenay: 63 votes (2 seats 31.5 votes/seat)
  - Lillooet: 201 votes (2 seats 100.5 votes/seat
  - Yale: 632 votes (3 seats 210.6 votes/seat)
- Lower Mainland 686 votes (3 seats 228.67 votes/seat:
  - New Westminster: 589 votes (2 seats 294.5 votes/seat)
  - New Westminster City: 97 votes (97 votes/seat)

Note that these figures refer to votes actually cast, not the population nor the eligible voters.

== Political context ==
=== Issues and debates ===
The issues of Chinese immigration and the unbuilt railway defined the politics of the period, and were the main topic of debate in the campaign as well as in the House. As ever since in British Columbia politics, a tough stand against the Dominion Government (Ottawa) upon these issues, and over better terms for BC, was a prerequisite for success at the polls. Politicians and newspapermen (often the same thing in the early Legislature) were alarmed that British Columbia appeared not to have a say in the route of the Canadian Pacific Railway, and that Ottawa had no plans to assist in immigration to the new province in order to build the railway and otherwise populate the former colony. The issue of a promised railway along the east coast of Vancouver Island to its southern tip at Victoria was also of major political importance, especially to voters in the Island ridings (Victoria City, Victoria, Nanaimo City, Comox, Alberni, Cowichan, Esquimalt).

Also occupying the House were capital proposals and expenditures on projects such as improvements to the Dewdney Trail, the Cariboo Road, the Grand Trunk Road (Old Yale Road), and the financing of the Lillooet Cattle Trail, even though its main proponent, Thomas Basil Humphreys, the first MLA for Lillooet, was now MLA for Victoria. Victoria City MLA Andrew Charles Elliott, soon to be Premier, had been a provincial Magistrate in Lillooet and also supported the project, then the largest capital expenditure in the new province to date, and larger than anything outlaid in the colonial period. The trail was finally built and used in its entirety and for its original purpose - bringing cattle from the West Fraser rangelands directly to the Coast - was a financial disaster (as were also the Dewdney, Cariboo and Grand Trunk projects, and as had been the Douglas Road originally.

=== Non-party system ===
There were to be no political parties in the new province. The designations "Government" and "Opposition" and "Independent" (and variations on these) functioned in place of parties, but they were very loose and do not represent formal coalitions, more alignments of support during the campaign. "Government" meant in support of the current Premier; "Opposition" meant campaigning against him, and often enough the Opposition would win and immediately become the Government. The Elections British Columbia notes for this election describe the designations as "Government (GOV.) candidates supported the administration of G.A.B. Walkem. Those opposed ran as Reform (REF.), Opposition (OPP.), Independent Reform (IND.REF.), or Independent Opposition (IND.OPP.) candidates. Those who ran as straight Independents (IND.) were sometimes described as Government supporters (IND./GOV.).

=== The Walkem Government ===
Actual governing coalitions were very shaky, and between 1871 and 1903, when parties were formalized in BC, there were sixteen governments (as defined by Premierships) but only ten elections. This was one of the few early elections that produced a stable regime, as the mandate was called for and won by the incumbent government of the popular George Anthony Boomer Walkem, who retired from the office of Premier a year later only to return in 1878 to serve again as Premier for a full four years further - a record in the period. In this election he had already been in office since the previous year, being voted to the position of Premier by the House after the retirement of Amor de Cosmos from the Legislature, as his serving in the provincial House simultaneously with his seat in the House of Commons in Ottawa had been disallowed. Walkem similarly returned in 1878 because of the retirement of Andrew Charles Elliott, who had assumed the reins of power when he retired from his seat in 1876 and had been offered an appointment as a judge. From Walkem's retirement in 1882 to the end of the Prior government and the non-party period in 1903 - eleven years - there were ten governments.

=== Byelections not shown ===
Any changes due to byelections are shown below the main table showing the theoretical composition of the House after the election. A final table showing the composition of the House at the dissolution of the Legislature at the end of this Parliament can be found below the byelections. The main table represents the immediate results of the election only, not changes in governing coalitions or eventual changes due to byelections.

=== List of ridings ===
The original ridings had remained twelve in number, electing 25 members of the first provincial legislature from 12 ridings (electoral districts), some with multiple members. There were no political parties were not acceptable in the House by convention, though some members were openly partisan at the federal level (usually Conservative, although both Liberal and Labour allegiance were on display by some candidates). In all there were 55 candidates in the election, competing for 5,656 votes cast.

These ridings were:

- Cariboo (three members)
- Comox
- Cowichan (two members)
- Esquimalt (two members)
- Kootenay (two members)
- Lillooet (two members)
- Nanaimo
- New Westminster (two members)
- New Westminster City
- Victoria (two members)
- Victoria City (four members)
- Yale (three members)

=== Polling conditions ===
The secret ballot had been instituted for the first time, unlike the open poll book and show of hands in the 1871 election. Nomination meetings for candidates, however, still retained the old show of hands method of voting. The election was called on August 30, with polling day on a varying schedule from September 11 to October 25 and the legislature meeting for the first time on January 10, 1876. The varying schedule meant that some returns were in on October 1, on the same day other ridings were voting and still others would vote long after new of the returns elsewhere had come in. Election days varied because of travel difficulties and local work and weather conditions, and even in New Westminster and Victoria the "city" ridings voted a week in advance of those for the surrounding more rural ridings, although no returns (count of votes) were in until after the interval elapsed.

Natives (First Nations) and Chinese were disallowed from voting, although naturalized Kanakas (Hawaiian colonists) and American and West Indian blacks and certain others participated. The requirement that knowledge of English be spoken for balloting was discussed but not applied.

== Results by riding ==
Results of British Columbia general election, 1875
Government		Opposition	
Member	Riding & party	Riding & party	Member
George Anthony Boomer Walkem^{1}	Cariboo; Government	Cariboo; Independent Opposition	Alexander Edmund Batson Davie
John Ash	Comox; Government	Cariboo; Independent Opposition	John Evans
William James Armstrong	New Westminster; Government; Independent/Government	Kootenay; Reform Caucus	Charles Gallagher
Ebenezer Brown	New Westminster; Government; Independent/Government	Kootenay; Reform Caucus	Arthur Wellesley Vowell
Robert Beaven	Victoria City; Government; Independent-Government	Cowichan; Reform Caucus	Edwin Pimbury
James Trimble	Victoria City; Government; Independent-Government	Cowichan; Reform Caucus	William Smithe
Robert Smith	Yale; Independent Government	Esquimalt; Independent; Reform Caucus	William Fisher
		Esquimalt; Independent; Reform Caucus	Frederick W. Williams
		Victoria; Reform Caucus	Thomas Basil Humphreys
		Victoria; Reform Caucus	William Fraser Tolmie
		Victoria City; Independent; Opposition	James W. Douglas
		Victoria City; Independent; Opposition	Andrew Charles Elliott
		Nanaimo	John Bryden
		Yale; Reform Caucus	John Andrew Mara
		Yale; Reform Caucus	Forbes George Vernon
^{1} Premier-Elect and Incumbent Premier			
Source: Elections BC

== Byelections ==
Two sets of byelections were held to confirm appointments to the Executive Council (cabinet), as was the custom in earlier times. Some ministerial candidates in this series of byelections were confirmed by acclamation, others were contested. These byelections were:

- Victoria - February 15, 1876, Thomas Basil Humphreys acclaimed
- Victoria City - A.C. Elliott (contested), February 22, 1876
- Yale - Forbes George Vernon (contested), March 11, 1876
- Cowichan - William Smithe acclaimed, August 14, 1876
- Cariboo - Alexander Edmund Batson Davie, who had been appointed to the Executive Council and so resigned his seat, was defeated by George Cowan Jn 20, 1877

Other byelections were also held due to deaths and other appointments; all were contested:

- Kootenay - William Cosgrove Milby, January 19, 1877; seat vacated by the resignation of A.W. Vowell upon appointment as Gold Commissioner for Cassiar 26 May 1876. Note: The Returning Officer cast the deciding vote for W.C. Milby. A show of hands on nomination day favoured Robert Galbraith (Victoria Colonist September 10, 1876).
- Nanaimo - David William Gordon, January 19, 1877; seat vacated by John Bryden in December 1876 to look after his business interests
- Kootenay - Robert Leslie Thomas Galbraith, January 19, 1877; seat vacated by the death of W.C. Milby October 26, 1877.

== Composition of House at dissolution ==
Note: Government/Opposition status applies to candidate at time of election in 1875, not at time of dissolution in 1878.

Composition of 2nd British Columbia Parliament at Dissolution, 1878
Government		Opposition	
Member	Riding & party	Riding & party	Member
George Anthony Boomer Walkem^{1}	Cariboo; Government	Cariboo; Independent Opposition	George Cowan
John Ash	Comox; Government	Cariboo; Independent Opposition	John Evans
William James Armstrong	New Westminster; Government; Independent/Government	Kootenay; Reform Caucus	Charles Gallagher
Ebenezer Brown	New Westminster; Government; Independent/Government	Kootenay; Reform Caucus	Robert Leslie Thomas Galbraith
Robert Beaven	Victoria City; Government; Independent-Government	Cowichan; Reform Caucus	Edwin Pimbury
James Trimble	Victoria City; Government; Independent-Government	Cowichan; Reform Caucus	William Smithe
Robert Smith	Yale; Independent Government	Esquimalt; Independent; Reform Caucus	William Fisher
David William Gordon	Nanaimo	Esquimalt; Independent; Reform Caucus	Frederick W. Williams
		Victoria; Reform Caucus	Thomas Basil Humphreys
		Victoria; Reform Caucus	William Fraser Tolmie
		Victoria City; Independent; Opposition	James W. Douglas
		Victoria City; Independent; Opposition	Andrew Charles Elliott
		Yale; Reform Caucus	John Andrew Mara
		Yale; Reform Caucus	Forbes George Vernon
Source: Elections BC

== Further reading & references ==
- In the Sea of Sterile Mountains: The Chinese in British Columbia, Joseph Morton, J.J. Douglas, Vancouver (1974). Despite its title, a fairly thorough account of the politicians and electoral politics in early BC.

== See also ==
- List of British Columbia political parties
