= 1878 British Columbia general election =

Canadian provincial election

← 1875	1878	1882 →

25 seats in the Legislative Assembly of British Columbia
Premier before election
Andrew Charles Elliott
Government
Premier after election
George Anthony Walkem
Opposition

The 1878 British Columbia general election was held in 1878.

== Political context ==
=== Non-party system ===
There were to be no political parties in the new province. The designations "Government" and "Opposition" and "Independent" (and variations on these) functioned in place of parties, but they were very loose and do not represent formal coalitions, more alignments of support during the campaign. "Government" meant in support of the current Premier; "Opposition" meant campaigning against him, and often enough the Opposition would win and immediately become the Government. The Elections British Columbia notes for this election describe the designations as "Government (GOV.) candidates supported the administration of G.A.B. Walkem. Those opposed ran as Reform (REF.), Opposition (OPP.), Independent Reform (IND.REF.), or Independent Opposition (IND.OPP.) candidates. Those who ran as straight Independents (IND.) were sometimes described as Government supporters (IND./GOV.).

=== The Walkem Government ===
See Notes on the previous election.

=== Byelections not shown ===
Any changes due to byelections are shown below the main table showing the theoretical composition of the House after the election. A final table showing the composition of the House at the dissolution of the Legislature at the end of this Parliament can be found below the byelections. The main table represents the immediate results of the election only, not changes in governing coalitions or eventual changes due to byelections.

=== List of ridings ===
The original ridings had remained twelve in number, electing 25 members of the first provincial legislature from 12 ridings (electoral districts), some with multiple members. There were no political parties were not acceptable in the House by convention, though some members were openly partisan at the federal level (usually Conservative, although both Liberal and Labour allegiance were on display by some candidates).

These ridings were:

- Cariboo (three members)
- Comox
- Cowichan (two members)
- Esquimalt (two members)
- Kootenay (two members)
- Lillooet (two members)
- Nanaimo
- New Westminster (two members)
- New Westminster City
- Victoria (two members)
- Victoria City (four members)
- Yale (three members)

==== Statistics ====
- Votes 6,377
- Candidates 46
- Members 25

Vancouver Island 3,714 votes, twelve seats 309.5 votes/seat

- Upper Island 695 votes, four seats (173.75 votes/seat)
  - Comox: 52 votes (52 votes/seat)
  - Cowichan: 292 votes (2 seats 196 votes/seat 83 voters/seat)
  - Nanaimo: 351 votes (351 votes/seat)
- "Greater Victoria" 3,019 votes, eight seats (377.375 votes/seat):
  - Victoria: 309 votes (2 seats 154.5 votes/seat)
  - Victoria City: 2,523 (4 seats 603.75 votes/seat)
  - Esquimalt: 187 (2 seats 93.5 votes/seat)

Mainland 2,271 votes 11 seats (excluding Kootenay's) 206.45 votes/seat :

- Interior 1,817 eight seats, 227.125 votes/seat (excepting Kootenay):
  - Cariboo: 788 votes (3 seats 264 votes/seat)
  - Kootenay: unknown (acclamation)
  - Lillooet: 241 votes (2 seats 51 votes/seat 120.5 votes/seat)
  - Yale: 788 votes (3 seats 57 votes/seat 262.67 votes/seat)
- Lower Mainland 454 votes (3 seats 151.33 votes/seat:
  - New Westminster: 309 votes (2 seats 154.5 votes/seat)
  - New Westminster City: 145 votes (145 votes/seat)

Note that these figures refer to votes actually cast, not the population per se nor the total of the potential voters' list.

=== Polling conditions ===
Property requirements for voting instigated for the 1875 election were dropped. Natives (First Nations) and Chinese were disallowed from voting, although naturalized Kanakas (Hawaiian colonists) and American and West Indian blacks and certain others participated. The requirement that knowledge of English be spoken for balloting was discussed but not applied.

== Results by riding ==
Results of British Columbia general election, 1878
Government		Opposition	
Member	Riding & party	Riding & party	Member
Edwin Pimbury	Cowichan; Government	Cariboo; Opposition	George Cowan
William Smithe	Cowichan; Government	Cariboo; Opposition	John Evans
Wellington John Harris	New Westminster; Government	Cariboo; Opposition	George Anthony Boomer Walkem^{1}
Donald McGillivray	New Westminster; Government	Comox; Opposition	John Ash
Ebenezer Brown	New Westminster City; Government	Esquimalt; Opposition	Hans Lars Helgesen
Preston Bennett	Yale; Government	Esquimalt; Opposition	Frederick W. Williams
John Andrew Mara	Yale; Government	Kootenay; Opposition	Robert Leslie Thomas Galbraith
Forbes George Vernon	Yale; Government	Kootenay; Opposition	Charles Gallagher
		Lillooet; Opposition	William M. Brown
		Lillooet; Opposition	William Saul
		Nanaimo; Opposition	James Atkinson Abrams
		Victoria; Opposition	Thomas Basil Humphreys
		Victoria; Opposition	James Thomas McIlmoyl
		Victoria City; Independent; Opposition	Robert Beaven
		Victoria City; Independent; Opposition	James Smith Drummond
		Victoria City; Independent; Opposition	John William Williams
		Victoria City; Independent; Opposition	William Wilson
^{1} Premier-Elect and Incumbent Premier			
Source: Elections BC

== Byelections ==
As customary, byelections were held to confirm the appointment of various members to the Executive Council (cabinet). In this Parliament, all three such byelections were won by acclamation:

  - Robert Beaven, Victoria City, July 10, 1878
  - Thomas Basil Humphreys, Victoria, July 10, 1878
  - George Anthony Boomer Walkem, Cariboo, August 3, 1878

Walkem's byelection acclamation confirmed him as Premier; Executive Council appointments were decided and made by the Lieutenant-Governor in this period, not by the Premier directly, but by the L-G in Consultation with the Premier (as still is the case, though only as a formal technicality, not in practice). The Premier's position itself was technically an appointment, as there were no political parties nor leaders, other than unofficial ones for each faction in the House to whom the Lieutenant-Governor would turn if their known caucus was sufficient to form a government.

Other byelections were held on the occasion of death, ill health, retirement and/or resignation for other reasons. These were won by:

  - George Ferguson, Cariboo, October 29, 1879 (replacing John Evans, who died August 25, 1879).
  - William James Armstrong, New Westminster City, Acclaimed December 20, 1879 (day of return of writ). Byelection caused by resignation of Ebenezer Brown November 1881 because of ill health, Victoria Standard November 19, 1881.

== Composition of House at dissolution ==
Note: Government/Opposition status applies to candidate at time of election in 1878, not at time of dissolution in 1882.

Composition of 3rd British Columbia Parliament at Dissolution, 1882
Government		Opposition	
Member	Riding & party	Riding & party	Member
Edwin Pimbury	Cowichan; Government	Cariboo; Opposition	George Cowan
William Smithe	Cowichan; Government	Cariboo; Opposition	George Ferguson
Wellington John Harris	New Westminster; Government	Cariboo; Opposition	George Anthony Boomer Walkem
Donald McGillivray	New Westminster; Government	Comox; Opposition	John Ash
William James Armstrong	New Westminster City; Government	Esquimalt; Opposition	Hans Lars Helgesen
Preston Bennett	Yale; Government	Esquimalt; Opposition	Frederick W. Williams
John Andrew Mara	Yale; Government	Kootenay; Opposition	Robert Leslie Thomas Galbraith
Forbes George Vernon	Yale; Government	Kootenay; Opposition	Charles Gallagher
		Lillooet; Opposition	William M. Brown
		Lillooet; Opposition	William Saul
		Nanaimo; Opposition	James Atkinson Abrams
		Victoria; Opposition	Thomas Basil Humphreys
		Victoria; Opposition	James Thomas McIlmoyl
		Victoria City; Independent; Opposition	Robert Beaven
		Victoria City; Independent; Opposition	James Smith Drummond
		Victoria City; Independent; Opposition	John William Williams
		Victoria City; Independent; Opposition	William Wilson
Source: Elections BC

== Further reading & references ==
- In the Sea of Sterile Mountains: The Chinese in British Columbia, Joseph Morton, J.J. Douglas, Vancouver (1974). Despite its title, a fairly thorough account of the politicians and electoral politics in early BC.

== See also ==
- List of British Columbia political parties
