= First Walkem ministry =

Cabinet of British Columbia, 1874–1876

- 3rd ministry of British Columbia

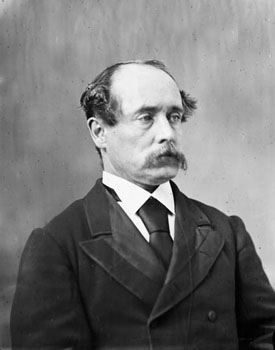
- Hon. George Anthony Walkem in 1875
- Date formed: February 11, 1874
- Date dissolved: January 27, 1876

People and organisations
- Monarch: Victoria
- Lieutenant Governor: Joseph Trutch
- Premier: George Anthony Walkem
- No. of ministers: 4
- Member parties: Non-partisan

History
- Election: 1875
- Legislature terms: 1st Parliament of British Columbia; 2nd Parliament of British Columbia
- Predecessor: De Cosmos ministry
- Successor: Elliott ministry

The first Walkem ministry was the combined Cabinet that governed British Columbia from February 11, 1874, to January 27, 1876. It was led by George Anthony Walkem, the third premier of British Columbia. This ministry was the first of two cabinets led by Walkem, as he lost a vote of no-confidence in 1876 but was reinstated to the position following the 1878 British Columbia general election, forming the second Walkem ministry.

== List of ministers ==
First Walkem ministry by portfolio
| Portfolio | Minister | Tenure | |
| Portfolio | Minister | Start | End |
|---|---|---|---|
| Premier of British Columbia | George Anthony Walkem | February 11, 1874 | January 27, 1876 |
| President of the Council | John Ash | October 26, 1875 | January 27, 1876 |
| Attorney General | George Anthony Walkem | February 11, 1874 | January 27, 1876 |
| Minister of Finance and Agriculture | William James Armstrong | February 11, 1874 | January 27, 1876 |
| Chief Commissioner of Lands and Works | Robert Beaven | February 11, 1874 | January 27, 1876 |
| Minister of Mines | John Ash | April 2, 1874 | January 27, 1876 |
| Provincial Secretary | John Ash | February 11, 1874 | January 27, 1876 |

== New portfolios ==
On March 2, 1874, the portfolio of Minister of Mines was created; John Ash was named the inaugural minister. However, this was not a separate position as such, and could only be held in jointly with another portfolio. This remained the case until 1899.
