= Elliott ministry =

Cabinet of British Columbia, 1876–1878

- 4th ministry of British Columbia
- Date formed: February 1, 1876
- Date dissolved: June 25, 1878

People and organisations
- Monarch: Victoria
- Lieutenant Governor: Joseph Trutch (1876); Albert Norton Richards (1876–1878)
- Premier: Andrew Charles Elliott
- Member parties: Non-partisan

History
- Legislature term: 2nd Parliament of British Columbia
- Predecessor: First Walkem ministry
- Successor: Second Walkem ministry

The Elliott ministry was the combined Cabinet that governed British Columbia from February 1, 1876, to June 25, 1878. It was led by Andrew Charles Elliott, the fourth premier of British Columbia. It was appointed by Lieutenant Governor Joseph Trutch after the first Walkem ministry lost a motion of no confidence. Following a poor showing in the 1878 election (including Elliott being personally defeated in his riding), it was replaced by the second Walkem ministry.

== List of ministers ==
Elliott ministry by portfolio
Portfolio	Minister	Tenure	
Portfolio	Minister	Start	End
Premier of British Columbia	Andrew Charles Elliott	February 1, 1876	June 25, 1878
President of the Council	Ebenezer Brown	February 1, 1876	September 11, 1876
President of the Council	Andrew Charles Elliott	September 1876	June 25, 1878
Attorney General	Andrew Charles Elliott	February 1, 1876	June 25, 1878
Minister of Finance and Agriculture	Thomas Basil Humphreys	February 1, 1876	July 24, 1876
Minister of Finance and Agriculture	William Smithe	July 26, 1876	June 25, 1878
Chief Commissioner of Lands and Works	Forbes George Vernon	February 1, 1876	June 25, 1878
Minister of Mines	Andrew Charles Elliott	February 1, 1876	May 17, 1877
Minister of Mines	Alexander Edmund Batson Davie	May 17, 1877	August 8, 1877
Minister of Mines	Andrew Charles Elliott	October 23, 1877	June 25, 1878
Provincial Secretary	Andrew Charles Elliott	February 1, 1876	May 15, 1877
Provincial Secretary	Alexander Edmund Batson Davie	May 15, 1877	August 8, 1877
Provincial Secretary	Andrew Charles Elliott	October 23, 1877	June 25, 1878
