= McCreight ministry =

Cabinet of British Columbia, 1871–1872

- 1st ministry of British Columbia
- Date formed: November 14, 1871
- Date dissolved: December 23, 1872

People and organisations
- Monarch: Victoria
- Lieutenant Governor: Joseph Trutch
- Premier: John Foster McCreight
- Member parties: Non-partisan

History
- Election: 1871
- Legislature term: 1st Parliament of British Columbia
- Predecessor: Interim ministry
- Successor: De Cosmos ministry

The McCreight ministry was the combined Cabinet that governed British Columbia from November 14, 1871, to December 23, 1872. It was led by John Foster McCreight, the first premier of British Columbia. The ministry was established following the first British Columbia general election held in October and November 1871. It replaced an interim ministry that was selected to govern the province from August 17, 1871, until the first parliament of British Columbia could confirm an elected premier and cabinet.

== List of ministers ==
McCreight ministry by portfolio
Portfolio	Minister	Tenure	
Portfolio	Minister	Start	End
Premier of British Columbia	John Foster McCreight	November 14, 1871	December 23, 1872
President of the Council	Henry Holbrook	April 26, 1872	December 23, 1872
Attorney General	John Foster McCreight	November 14, 1871	December 23, 1872
Chief Commissioner of Lands and Works	Henry Holbrook	November 14, 1871	January 12, 1872
Chief Commissioner of Lands and Works	George Anthony Walkem	January 12, 1872	December 23, 1872
Provincial Secretary (Note: "Colonial Secretary" from November 14, 1871 to April 11, 1872)	Alexander Rocke Robertson	November 14, 1871	December 23, 1872
Member without Portfolio	Henry Holbrook	January 15, 1872	April 26, 1872
