= Walkem ministry =

The Walkem ministry may refer to one of two cabinets of led by George Anthony Walkem, the 3rd and 5th premier of British Columbia.

- First Walkem ministry (1874–1876)
- Second Walkem ministry (1878–1882)
