= Wellington John Harris =

British Columbia Legislative Assemblyman

Member of the Legislative Assembly of British Columbia for New Westminster
- In office May 22, 1878 – July 24, 1882 Serving with Donald McGillivray
- Preceded by: William James Armstrong and Ebenezer Brown
- Succeeded by: John Robson and James Orr

1st Reeve of Maple Ridge
- In office 1874–1875
- Preceded by: position established
- Succeeded by: Henry Dawson

Personal details
- Born: October 9, 1839 Oxford, Ontario
- Died: December 25, 1919 (aged 80) Pitt Meadows, British Columbia

Wellington John Harris (Note: Also known as Wellington Jeffers Harris) (October 9, 1839 – December 25, 1919) was a Canadian political figure in British Columbia. He served as the first reeve of Maple Ridge, and was elected to the Legislative Assembly of British Columbia for New Westminster from 1878–1882. He is the namesake of Harris Road, the main north-south thoroughfare in Pitt Meadows.

== Electoral record ==
1878 British Columbia general election: New Westminster
Party	Candidate	Votes	%	Elected
Government	Donald McGillivray	202	28.86	✓
Government	Wellington John Harris	171	24.43	✓
Opposition	James Orr	153	21.86	
Opposition	Henry Mathers	130	18.57	
Independent	James Kennedy	44	6.28	
Total valid votes		700	100.00	
Source: Elections BC
