= Interim ministry (British Columbia) =

Cabinet of British Columbia, 1871

- Interim ministry of British Columbia
- Date formed: August 17, 1871
- Date dissolved: November 13, 1871

People and organisations
- Monarch: Victoria
- Lieutenant Governor: Joseph Trutch
- Premier: Not appointed
- No. of ministers: 3
- Ministers removed: 1
- Total no. of members: 4
- Member parties: Non-partisan

History
- Predecessor: Governorship of Anthony Musgrave
- Successor: McCreight ministry

The Interim ministry of British Columbia was the combined Cabinet that governed British Columbia from August 17 to November 13, 1871. British Columbia had initially joined Canada as a province on July 20, 1871, but continued to be governed by the previous colonial government until the interim ministry could be set up. The ministry was established to govern the province until the first British Columbia general election could be held in October and November 1871. Following the election, the members of the first parliament of British Columbia elected John Foster McCreight to be the first premier of British Columbia.

== List of ministers ==
Interim ministry by portfolio
Portfolio	Minister	Tenure	
Portfolio	Minister	Start	End
Attorney General	Edward Graham Alston	August 17, 1871	August 22, 1871
Attorney General	John Foster McCreight	August 22, 1871	November 13, 1871
Chief Commissioner of Lands and Works	Benjamin William Pearse	August 17, 1871	November 13, 1871
Colonial Secretary	Charles Good	August 17, 1871	November 13, 1871
