= Donald McGillivray =

Donald McGillivray may refer to:

- Donald McGillivray (botanist) (1935–2012), Australian botanical taxonomist
- Donald McGillivray (politician) (1838–1913), politician in British Columbia
- Donald MacGillivray, a song from Jacobite Relics

== See also ==
- Donald MacGillivray, Scottish colonial administrator
