= Second Walkem ministry =

Cabinet of British Columbia, 1874–1876

- 5th ministry of British Columbia
- Date formed: June 25, 1878
- Date dissolved: June 6, 1882

People and organisations
- Monarch: Victoria
- Lieutenant Governor: Albert Norton Richards; Clement Francis Cornwall
- Premier: George Anthony Walkem
- No. of ministers: 3
- Member parties: Non-partisan

History
- Election: 1878
- Legislature term: 3rd Parliament of British Columbia
- Predecessor: Elliott ministry
- Successor: Beaven ministry

The second Walkem ministry was the combined Cabinet that governed British Columbia from June 25, 1878, to June 6, 1882. It was led by George Anthony Walkem, the fifth premier of British Columbia. This ministry was the second of two cabinets led by Walkem, as he served two non-consecutive terms as premier, the first being from 1874 to 1876.

== List of ministers ==
Second Walkem ministry by portfolio
Portfolio	Minister	Tenure	
Portfolio	Minister	Start	End
Premier of British Columbia	George Anthony Walkem	June 25, 1878	June 6, 1882
President of the Council	George Anthony Walkem	June 26, 1878	June 6, 1882
Attorney General	George Anthony Walkem	June 25, 1878	June 6, 1882
Minister of Finance and Agriculture	Robert Beaven	June 26, 1878	June 6, 1882
Chief Commissioner of Lands and Works	George Anthony Walkem	June 26, 1878	June 6, 1882
Minister of Mines	Thomas Basil Humphreys	July 11, 1878	June 6, 1882
Provincial Secretary	Thomas Basil Humphreys	June 26, 1878	June 6, 1882
