= Milby =

Milby may refer to:

== Surname ==
- Ada Milby (born 1983), Filipino-American rugby player
- William Cosgrove Milby (dead 1877), Canadian politician
- Sam Milby, Filipino actor and musician

== Other uses ==
- Milby, North Yorkshire, England
- MiLBY Awards, baseball awards
