= William Norman Bole =

Irish-Canadian lawyer and politician

William Norman Bole, KC (December 6, 1846 – April 7, 1923) was an Irish-born lawyer, judge and political figure in British Columbia. He represented New Westminster City in the Legislative Assembly of British Columbia from 1886 to 1889.

He was born in Castlebar, County Mayo, the son of John Bole and Elizabeth Jane Argyle, and was educated in Dublin. In 1877, he arrived at San Francisco en route to Queensland. Having missed his ship, Bole changed his plans and travelled to Victoria. He was called to the British Columbia bar the following year. Still planning to continue on to Australia eventually, Bole set up practice in New Westminster. In 1881, he married Florence Blanchard Coulthard. In 1884, Bole was named police magistrate for New Westminster. In the same year, he ran unsuccessfully for a seat in the provincial assembly in a by-election.

In 1887, he was named Queen's Counsel and, in 1889, County Court judge. In 1891, he became a local judge in the Supreme Court. Bole also served as a captain in the militia and as president of the Board of Trade. He was reportedly an excellent marksman. He died in New Westminster at the age of 76.

Bole named the village of Belcarra, whose Irish name means "the fair land upon which the sun shines," after a village in Ireland.
