= Smithe =

Other names
- Variant form: Smith

Smithe is a rare surname related to the common surname Smith.

Among notable people sharing this surname is William Smithe. Other instances appear in genealogical resource searches, but associated with the general population.

- England (1842–1887) William Smithe, immigrated to Canada

== Etymology ==
In the mid-19th Century, a supposition was published that people may well alter a single letter in their 'Smith' surname for reasons of status or recognition; as Lower puts it, "...yet it would appear, from the addition and alteration of a letter, that some families are anxious to avoid the imputation of so plebeian an origin." In the 1842 novel Zanoni, Lytton articulates a variation on this by suggesting people changing surname from 'Smith' to 'Smithe' may well be trying to increase the stature of their surname by approaching ever so slightly a purported surname of the god Apollo: Smintheus.

== Frequency ==
In looking at various surname frequency resources, the rarity of 'Smithe' is apparent. In the 1990 United States Census, 'Smithe' ranked near the bottom 10% of surnames in frequency, showing an overall rank of 78,005. Regarding information assembled by The National Trust related to surname frequency in Great Britain, neither in 1990 nor 1881 was 'Smithe' sufficiently high for inclusion in their statistical analyses. Nonetheless, sufficient 'Smithe' surname responses appeared in the 1881 census to support County-geographical mapping of surname distribution, but even this level of information is lacking for 1990 census data.
