= David William Gordon =

Canadian politician

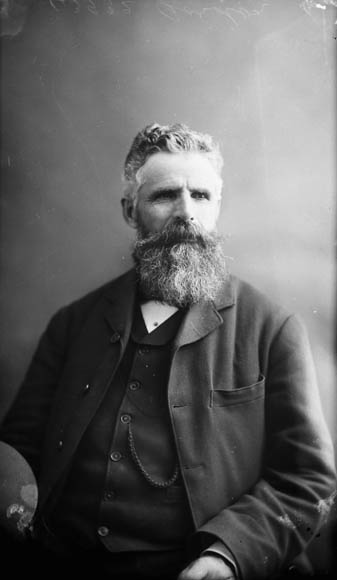

Member of the Canadian Parliament for Vancouver
- In office 1882–1893
- Preceded by: Arthur Bunster
- Succeeded by: Andrew Haslam

Member of the Legislative Assembly of British Columbia for Nanaimo
- In office 1877–1878

Personal details
- Born: February 27, 1832 Camden Township, Upper Canada
- Died: February 19, 1893 (aged 60) Nanaimo, British Columbia
- Party: Liberal-Conservative

David William Gordon (February 27, 1832 – February 19, 1893) was a Canadian politician from British Columbia.

Gordon was born in Camden Township, Upper Canada, the son of Michael Gordon. He went to California in 1856 and then moved to the Colony of Vancouver Island in 1858, where he established himself as a professional architect and builder in Nanaimo. Gordon was a prominent citizen and one of the wealthiest men in the city. He ran as an unaffiliated candidate in the 1875 provincial election, losing a close race to John Bryden, an "opposition" candidate. Gordon was later successful in an 1877 by-election called because of Bryden's resignation. He served as "government" member, supporting Premier George Anthony Walkem. He was unable to retain the seat in the following general election.

Gordon ran as a Liberal-Conservative candidate in the federal election just two months following his provincial defeat in 1878. He was unable to unseat incumbent Liberal Arthur Bunster in the Vancouver (Island) district. Gordon was not deterred and later defeated Bunster by a wide margin in the following election, in 1882. He was re-elected over a Conservative opponent 1887 and acclaimed in 1891. Gordon died in office in 1893.

Gordon was married twice: to Emma Elizabeth Robb in 1864 and to Statira Catherine Shepard in 1886.
