= William Henry Hayward =

Canadian politician

MLA for Esquimalt
- In office 1900–1903

MLA for Cowichan
- In office 1907–1918

Personal details
- Born: 23 October 1867 Dover, Kent, England
- Died: 7 February 1932 (aged 64) London, England
- Party: Independent

William Henry Hayward (23 October 1867 – 7 February 1932) was an English-born farmer and political figure in British Columbia. He represented Esquimalt from 1900 to 1903 and Cowichan from 1907 to 1918 as a Conservative in the Legislative Assembly of British Columbia. He served as deputy speaker of the Legislature from 1911 to 1916.

He was born in Dover, Kent and was educated at Borden Grammar School, Sutton Valence School and at Dover College. From 1887 to 1893, he was involved in tobacco planting in Virginia. Hayward was an unsuccessful candidate for a seat in the provincial assembly in 1898. He was president of the Central Dairy Institute, a director of the Dairymen's Association of British Columbia and secretary-treasurer for the BC Fruit Growers Association. On several occasions, Hayward proposed amendments to the province's Land Act to bar non-Caucasians from acquiring Crown lands in the province. In 1916, he ran for reelection as an Independent candidate, although he was endorsed by the Conservatives. He resigned his seat in November 1918 "due to official military duties in Ottawa". He died at London in 1932.
