= Belcarra =

- Village
- Village of Belcarra
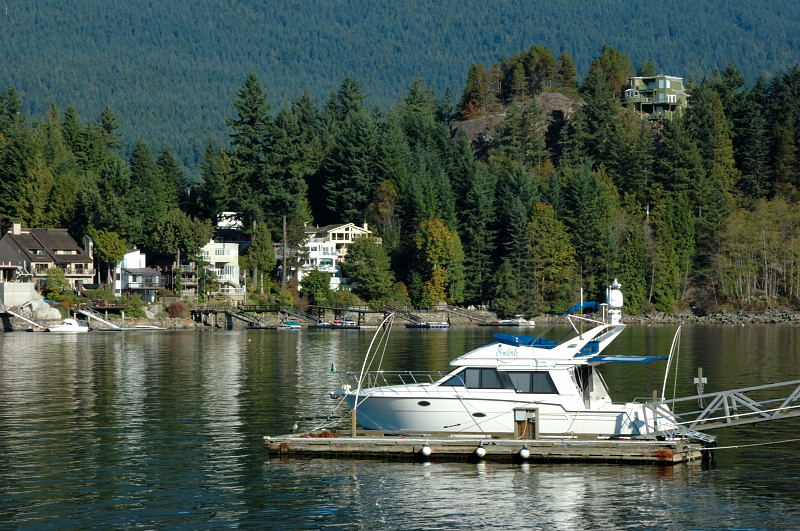
- Private dock at Belcarra
- Motto: "Between Forest And Sea"
- Location of Belcarra in Metro Vancouver
- Coordinates: 49°18′53″N 122°55′32″W
- Country: Canada
- Province: British Columbia
- Regional district: Metro Vancouver
- Incorporated: August 22, 1979
- Named for: Belcarra, County Mayo
- Seat: Belcarra Village Hall

Government
  - Type: Mayor-council government
  - Body: Belcarra Council
  - Mayor: Jamie Ross
  - Council: List of Councillors: John Snell; Carolina Clark; Bruce Drake; Liisa Wilder
  - MP: Zoe Royer (Liberal Party of Canada)
  - MLA: Rick Glumac (New Democratic)

Area
  - Land: 5.50 km^{2} (2.12 sq mi)
- Elevation: 30 m (98 ft)

Population (2021)
  - Total: 687
  - Estimate (2023): 729
  - Density: 124.8/km^{2} (323/sq mi)
- Time zone: UTC−07:00 (BC Pacific Time)
- Forward sortation area: V3H
- Area codes: 604, 778, 236, 672
- Waterways: Indian Arm of Burrard Inlet
- Website: Village of Belcarra

Belcarra is a village on the shore of Indian Arm, a side inlet of Burrard Inlet, and is part of Metro Vancouver. It lies northwest of Port Moody and immediately east of the Deep Cove area of North Vancouver, across the waters of Indian Arm. Isolated by geography on a narrow peninsula, Belcarra is accessible by a single winding paved road or by water. Before incorporation it was commonly known as Belcarra Bay.

It is largely a residential bedroom community for Vancouver and its suburbs. Belcarra is one of the few communities in this area that is not growing substantially. While the small neighbouring Village of Anmore has grown and changed, Belcarra has remained a relatively small community. This is a result of small land area, relative inaccessibility, and zoning for single family residential homes. With a population of 687 as of 2021, it has one of the lowest populations of any independent settlement in the Vancouver area. Many residents in Belcarra have private docks and boats; even houses that are not on the water are sometimes able to procure a shared dock.

== Etymology ==
William Norman Bole, a successful criminal lawyer and later a judge in New Westminster, was an immigrant from Ireland in the 19th century. As payment for his defence of the Irishman John Hall, Belcarra's first European settler, Bole acquired the land that would become the Village of Belcarra. He named it after a village in his native Ireland.

== History ==
Belcarra was the site of the main village of the Tsleil-Waututh, the First Nations people whose territory it is in. Its name (anglicized) was Tumtemaytum and its beach and exposed westerly view give it a fine outlook and afternoon sun. Around 1840 the village was virtually destroyed in a particularly murderous raid by Namgis warriors from Alert Bay and subsequently abandoned in favour of the current reserve site further west near Dollarton. The site at Belcarra was pre-empted early by European settlers, who were involved in a murder in 1882. In turn, the land was deeded to the defending solicitor, William Norman Bole, who named the place Belcarra. A summer cabin was subsequently built. In time, more cabins were built, and the local ferry company built a pier, park, and campsite, for vacationers. Admiralty Point was a government naval reserve, and was thus saved from development. The area is now a regional park.

Belcarra's adjacency to several islands makes it a desired spot for boaters. Bedwell Bay and Sasamat Lake also are nearby, increasing the appeal.

== Demographics ==
In the 2021 Census of Population conducted by Statistics Canada, Belcarra had a population of 687 living in 262 of its 289 total private dwellings, a change of 6.8% from its 2016 population of 643. With a land area of 5.50 km^{2} (2.12 sq mi), it had a population density of 124.9/km^{2} (323.5/sq mi) in 2021.

The linguistic makeup of the village is English as the first language of 91.2% of the population, and 8.0% first learnt other languages. 94.2% of the population can speak only English, 5.1% can speak both English and French.

In the village the age distribution is 17.6% under the age of 14, 11.0% from 15 to 24, 25.0% from 25 to 44, 40.4% from 45 to 64, and 6.6% who are 65 years of age or older. The median age is 44 years. For every 100 females there are 101.5 males.

For every 100 females age 15 and over, there are 107.3 males. There are 260 households, out of which 26.9% had children living with them, 69.2% ware married couples living together, 4.5% had a female householder with no husband present, and 19.2% of all households are made up of individuals. The average married-couple family size was 2.7.

Christians makes up 55.1% of the population, or 22.8% Catholic, 27.2% Protestant, 0.0% Orthodox, and 5.1% other Christian. Other religions in the village include 1.5% Jewish, and 1.5% other religions. 41.2% of the population claimed to have no religious affiliation.

The median income for a household in the village was $100,995, and the median income for a family was $105,016. Males had an average income of $61,200 versus $34,840 for females. About 3.7% of the labour force was unemployed. The largest occupation categories were 23.5% employed in social science, education, government service and religion occupations, 17.3% business, finance and administration occupations, 17.3% sales and service occupations, and 16.0% in management occupations.

Canada 2016 Census
Ethnic groups		Population	% of Total Population
Visible minority groups	South Asian	10	1.7%
Visible minority groups	Chinese	45	7.6%
Visible minority groups	Other visible minority	5	0.8%
Visible minority groups	Total visible minority population	60	10.1%
European Canadian		535	89.9%
Total population		595	100%

Note: Percentages may not total 100 percent due to rounding of data samples.

== Emergency services ==
Belcarra contracts out its police service to the Royal Canadian Mounted Police, with the main police station at Coquitlam Town Centre. Since 1978, Belcarra has had its own volunteer fire service, known as the Sasamat Fire Department, with two main halls and five fire apparatuses shared between it and the neighbouring community of Anmore. Belcarra's ambulance service is run by the British Columbia Ambulance Service.

In addition, Coquitlam Search and Rescue is responsible for urban and wilderness search and rescue for the area between Indian Arm and Pitt Lake, and encompasses the local communities of Port Coquitlam, Port Moody, Belcarra and Anmore.

== Transportation ==
As part of Metro Vancouver, Belcarra is served by the TransLink public transit system, and is on bus route 182.

== Twinning ==
Belcarra in June 2007 was twinned with its namesake, Belcarra, County Mayo, Ireland.

== In popular culture ==
In April 2019, Canadian heavy metal band Spiritbox released a song called "Belcarra", named after the village.
