= Henry Fry (politician) =

Canadian politician

- Born: January 29, 1826; Barnstaple, Devon, England
- Died: April 16, 1892 (aged 66); Victoria District
- Occupations: merchant, miner and political figure

Henry Fry (January 29, 1826 – April 16, 1892) was an English-born merchant, miner and political figure in British Columbia. He represented Cowichan in the Legislative Assembly of British Columbia from 1887 to 1890.

He was born in Barnstaple, Devon and was educated there. Fry entered his father's business and later pursued business in other parts of England. In 1855, he moved to Hamilton, Province of Canada establishing himself in business there. Fry sold his business in Hamilton in 1860 and returned to England. In 1862, he came to Victoria and then went to Cariboo where he was involved in mining. From 1864 to 1869, he operated a business in Victoria. He then purchased a farm in the Cowichan Valley. After being an unsuccessful candidate in the 1871 provincial election, Fry was elected to the assembly in an 1887 by-election held following the death of William Smithe. He did not seek a second term in the 1890 provincial election. He died in the Victoria District at the age of 66.
