= Andrew Haslam =

Canadian politician

- Education: Royal College of Art
- Occupations: Graphic designer, author, educator
- Known for: Book Design (2006); Type and Typography (2002)
- Title: Professor
- Awards: American Institute of Physics Science Writing Award; Times Educational Supplement Information Book Award

Andrew Haslam (June 23, 1846 – April 10, 1923) was an Irish-Canadian sawmill-owner and Conservative politician. Born at Woodhill, Donegal, Ireland.

He served as the MLA for Nanaimo from an 1889 by-election until his retirement at the 1890 provincial election. From 1892 to 1893, he was mayor of Nanaimo. He was chosen in an 1893 by-election to represent Vancouver in the House of Commons of Canada after the serving MP, David William Gordon died. Haslam was defeated in the 1896 general election.

He also served three terms on New Westminster City Council.

A road north of Nanaimo Airport was named for him.

Parliament of Canada
Preceded by David William Gordon, Liberal-Conservative	Member of Parliament for Vancouver; 1893–1896	Succeeded by William Wallace Burns McInnes, Liberal
