= Bedwell Bay =

Bay in British Columbia, Canada

Coordinates: 49°19′24″N 122°54′37″W

Location of Bedwell Bay in British Columbia

Bedwell Bay is a bay in British Columbia. It is a part of Indian Arm, and is located in the village municipality of Belcarra.
