= Thomas Gifford (politician) =

Canadian politician (1854–1935)

Member of Legislative Assembly of British Columbia for New Westminster City
- In office 1901–1916
- Preceded by: John Cunningham Brown
- Succeeded by: David Whiteside

Personal details
- Born: June 1, 1854 Lockerbie, Scotland
- Died: February 19, 1935 (aged 80) New Westminster, British Columbia
- Party: Conservative
- Spouse: Annie Stoddart

Thomas Gifford (June 1, 1854 – February 19, 1935) was a politician in British Columbia, Canada.

Born in 1854 in Lockerbie, Scotland, the son of William Gifford and Margaret Stewart, he was educated there and apprenticed as a jeweller. He opened his own store in Lockerbie around 1876. In 1877, he married Annie Stoddart. Thomas and his wife, along with sons William (b. 3 Jul 1878) and Thomas Stuart (b. 3 Jun 1880), emigrated to St. Paul, Minnesota in 1881. Here, they had a daughter Margaret (b. 6 Apr 1882) and another son, James Stoddart (b. 26 Sep 1888), before moving again to New Westminster, British Columbia, Canada, where Gifford opened a jewelry store. They had three more children - Julia Stuart (b. 8 Aug 1888), Hugh Wilson (b. 29 May 1892), and John Jardine (b. 25 Nov 1893) - and lived the rest of their lives in New Westminster. Gifford served as an alderman for New Westminster, as well as a member of the school board, hospital board and Board of Trade.

Thomas was elected to the Legislative Assembly of British Columbia in a 1901 by-election held after John Cunningham Brown was named to cabinet, and was re-elected in 1903, 1907, 1909 and 1912. He was defeated when he sought a sixth term in the Legislature in the 1916 provincial election.

He died in New Westminster at the age of 80 in 1935.
