= John Newell Evans =

Canadian politician

John Newell Evans (May 9, 1846 – January 8, 1944) was a Welsh-born farmer and political figure in British Columbia. He represented Cowichan from 1903 to 1907 as a Liberal.

== Life and career ==
He was born in Montgomeryshire, the son of James Evans, and was educated in Wales and in London. He apprenticed with a dry goods merchant in London and then left for British Columbia in 1864. He worked at building roads in Victoria and, two years later, went to California, where he was involved in mining until 1870. Evans then settled in the Cowichan district, where he purchased a homestead. Evans served as reeve for North Cowichan. He was also president of the Cowichan Creamery Association. Evans was defeated when he ran for reelection in 1907 and 1909.

== Personal life ==
In 1873, he married Mary Jane Davies, also a native of Wales.

== Death ==
He died in Duncan at the age of 97.
