= John Cunningham Brown =

Canadian politician (1844–1929)

- Born: February 13, 1844; Fermoy, County Cork, Ireland
- Died: January 18, 1929 (aged 84); New Westminster, British Columbia, Canada
- Education: Queen's College (non-graduate)
- Occupation(s): publisher, politician
- Spouse: Kate E. Clarkson
- Parent: Robert Campbell Brown

John Cunningham Brown (February 13, 1844 – January 18, 1929) was an Irish-born newspaper owner and political figure in British Columbia. He represented New Westminster City in the Legislative Assembly of British Columbia from 1890 to 1894 and from 1900 to 1901.

He was born in Fermoy in 1844, the son of Robert Campbell Brown, and was educated at the Royal Academy in Belfast. Brown entered Queen's College in 1861, planning to study medicine, but left the following year for Victoria, British Columbia with a brother. He went to the Stickeen mines, returning to Victoria, and then settled in New Westminster the following year. He entered the newspaper business and, in 1871, established the Herald, later the British Columbian. Brown sold the newspaper in 1880 after he was named postmaster for New Westminster. In 1887, he married Kate E. Clarkson. Brown was a member of the local militia and also served as chairman of the board of school trustees. He was mayor of New Westminster from 1890 to 1891. Brown was named to the provincial cabinet as Provincial Secretary in 1900; due to the regulations at that time, he was required to run again for his seat in a by-election and he lost his seat in the assembly to Thomas Gifford in September 1901. In 1907, he was named warden for the British Columbia Penitentiary, located in New Westminster. He died in New Westminster at the age of 84 on January 8, 1929.
