= William Wallace Burns McInnes =

Canadian politician

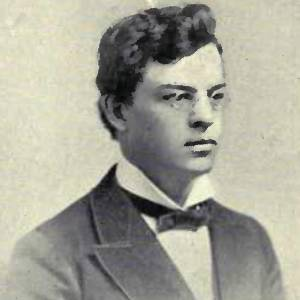
William Wallace Burns McInnes

William Wallace Burns McInnes (8 April 1871 – 4 August 1954) was a Canadian politician, lawyer and served as the fifth commissioner of Yukon.

Born in Dresden, Ontario, the son of Thomas Robert McInnes, McInnes entered the University of Toronto at the age of 14 and graduated in 1889, the youngest graduate to that date. After studying at Osgoode Hall, he was called to the British Columbia Bar in 1893 and practiced law in Nanaimo and Vancouver.

A member of the Liberal Party of Canada, McInnes won the federal constituency of Vancouver in 1896 and sat in the House of Commons of Canada in Ottawa. In 1900, he represented Port Alberni in the British Columbia Legislature for five years. In Victoria, he served as Provincial Secretary, President of the Council, and Minister of Education.

On 27 May 1905, McInnes was appointed to the office of Commissioner in the Yukon Territory. His term in office was said to be one of reform and stability, in contrast to the term of his predecessor, Frederick Tennyson Congdon. He was said to be one of the most popular politicians in the Yukon in the early 1900s. However, on 31 December 1906, McInnes resigned and looked to sit once again in the B C Legislature and then later in the House of Commons. J. T. Lithgow took over as Acting Commissioner until a successor to McInnes could be appointed.

He was an unsuccessful candidate in the 1907 and 1920 BC provincial elections.

McInnes also ran as a candidate in 1908, 1917 and 1921 federal elections but was unsuccessful on all occasions.

In 1909, McInnes was appointed a judge and served in the County Court of Vancouver from 1909 to 1917. He served as police magistrate for ten years, beginning in 1944, and was known for the severity of his sentences.

William Wallace Burns McInnes died in Vancouver in 1954.

Parliament of Canada
Preceded by Andrew Haslam	Member of Parliament for Vancouver; 1896–1900	Succeeded by Ralph Smith
Political offices
Preceded by Frederick Tennyson Congdon	Commissioner of the Yukon; 1905–1906	Succeeded by Alexander Henderson
