= A White Man's Province =

1989 book by Patricia E. Roy

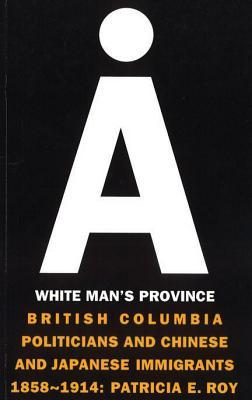
- Author: Patricia E. Roy
- Original title: A White Man's Province: British Columbia Politicians and Chinese and Japanese Immigrants, 1858-1914
- Language: English
- Published: 1989
- Publisher: University of British Columbia Press
- Publication place: Canada

A White Man's Province: British Columbia Politicians and Chinese and Japanese Immigrants, 1858-1914 is a 1989 book by Patricia E. Roy, published by the University of British Columbia Press. It discusses late 19th and early 20th century anti-Asian sentiment within British Columbia. Politicians from British Columbia referred to the place as "a white man's province", and the book includes an analysis of the phrase itself. As of 1992 Roy was planning to create a sequel.

== Background ==
Roy is a history professor at the University of British Columbia, and during a large portion of her academic career she studied Asian Canadian history. The book was a part of a larger historical research project. As part of the book's research, the author analyzed the period's newspapers and archives in British Columbia and Ottawa.

== Contents ==
The foreword has an outline of the major points. The first chapter discusses the 1850s initial arrival of the Chinese. The second discusses the ideas propagated in British Columbia around 1871–1894 in regards to the Asians. The third discusses the in-progress Canadian Pacific Railway and the relations between that, the ethnic Chinese, and the Ottawa-based federal government in the period 1871–1885. The fourth chapter discusses anti-Japanese and anti-Chinese laws passed in the period 1886–1896. The fifth chapter discusses anti-Asian laws between 1896 and 1902, including the head tax. The sixth chapter discusses British Columbia's efforts to reduce the number of Asians employed in various sectors. The seventh discusses the period after the Chinese head tax and the Japanese government's restrictions on immigration of its own people to Canada were both instituted, and the consequential reduction of immigration. This chapter covers 1903–1907. The eighth chapter discusses the Anti-Oriental Riots. This is the book's most lengthy chapter. The ninth chapter discusses 1908-1914 anti-Asian exclusionary activity, and it also states the overall attitudes towards China, Japan, and Chinese and Japanese immigration held by White British Columbians of the era.

Mary C. Waters of Harvard University wrote that the author "assumes a high level of familiarity with Canadian and British Columbian history and personalities" and "the reader must labor through a great deal of detail and some repetition to be able to abstract general principles and historical themes and developments."

== Reception ==
Gunther Barth of the University of California, Berkeley wrote that the book was "solid" and "well-researched".

Paul M. Koroscil of Simon Fraser University wrote that the book was "an excellent study on the topic" and "a major contribution to the historical literature of British Columbia".

Victor Satzewich of the University of Saskatchewan wrote that overall the book was "interesting and well-researched" and that it was "an important contribution to knowledge and should be read by anyone with an interest in the issues of racism, immigration policy, British Columbia history, and minority groups in Canada." Satzewich argued that Roy did not "clearly demarcate" racism in regards to "racial characteristics" and racism in regards to "capital and labour"-based conflicts, and that the book should have included an "extended discussion of why Chinese and Japanese were more competitive in the labour market".

Robert K. Whelan, of the College of Urban and Public Affairs of the University of New Orleans, wrote that the book is "more ambitious and broader in scope" compared to The Voyage of the Komagata Maru: The Sikh Challenge to Canada's Colour Bar by Hugh Johnston; he stated "Both of these are excellent works—well written and well researched".

Waters wrote that the book sometimes is "repetitive and dense" and that "raw material" "does provide some material that could serve as the basis for interesting general themes" regarding the "complex relationship between race and class" and how the definition of races may change as time passes.

== See also ==
- Chinese Canadians in British Columbia
- In the Sea of Sterile Mountains
