= New Westminster City =

Defunct provincial electoral district in British Columbia, Canada

British Columbia electoral district

Defunct provincial electoral district
- Legislature: Legislative Assembly of British Columbia
- District created: 1871
- District abolished: 1912
- First contested: 1871
- Last contested: 1909

New Westminster City was a provincial electoral district in the Canadian province of British Columbia from 1871 to 1912.

== Members of the Legislative Assembly ==
Assembly	Years	Member	Party
New Westminster City
1st	1871–1875	Henry Holbrook	Independent
2nd	1875–1878	Robert Dickinson	Government
3rd	1878–1881	Ebenezer Brown	Government
3rd	1881–1882	William James Armstrong	Independent
4th	1882–1884	William James Armstrong	Government
4th	1884–1886	James Cunningham	Government
5th	1886–1890	William Norman Bole	Opposition
6th	1890–1894	John Cunningham Brown	Government
7th	1894–1898	James Buckham Kennedy	Opposition
8th	1898–1900	Alexander Henderson	Government
9th	1900–1903	John Cunningham Brown	Government
11th	1903–1907	Thomas Gifford	Conservative
12th	1907–1909	Thomas Gifford	Conservative
12th	1909–1912	Thomas Gifford	Conservative
Riding dissolved into New Westminster		Thomas Gifford	Conservative

== Electoral history ==
1871 British Columbia general election
Party	Candidate	Votes	Elected
Independent	Henry Holbrook	acclaimed	✓
Source: Elections BC

British Columbia provincial by-election, November 1871 Resignation of Henry Holbrook upon appointment to Executive Council
Party	Candidate	Votes	Elected
Independent	Henry Holbrook	acclaimed	✓
Source: Elections BC

1875 British Columbia general election
Party	Candidate	Votes	%	Elected
Independent-Government	Robert Dickinson	59	60.82	✓
Opposition	Henry Holbrook	38	39.18	
Source: Elections BC

3rd British Columbia election, 1878
Party	Candidate	Votes	%	±	Expenditures
Opposition	William James Armstrong	64	43.84%		unknown
Government	Ebenezer Brown	82	56.16%		unknown
Total valid votes		146	100.00%		
Total rejected ballots					
Turnout		%			

British Columbia byelection: New Westminster City, December 20, 1881 ^{2}
Party	Candidate	Votes	%	±	Expenditures
Independent	William James Armstrong	Acclaimed	-.- %		unknown
Total valid votes		n/a	-.- %		
^{2} The byelection was called due to the resignation of Ebenezer Brown in November 1881 because of ill health.

4th British Columbia election, 1882
Party	Candidate	Votes	%	±	Expenditures
Independent	William James Armstrong	Accl.			

British Columbia byelection: New Westminster City, September 4, 1882 ^{2}
Party	Candidate	Votes	%	±	Expenditures
Government	William James Armstrong	104	67.76%	–	unknown
Opposition	William Douglas Ferris	49	32.24%	–	unknown
Total valid votes		153	100.00%		
^{2} The byelection was called due to W. J. Armstrong's resignation upon his appointment to the Executive Council (cabinet) August 23, 1882.

British Columbia byelection: New Westminster City, April 21, 1884 ^{2}
Party	Candidate	Votes	%	±	Expenditures
Opposition	William Norman Bole	55	32.74%	–	unknown
Government	James Cunningham	79	47.02%	–	unknown
Independent	Henry Valentine Edmonds	34	20.24%		unknown
Total valid votes		168	100.00%		
^{2} The byelection was called due to W. J. Armstrong's resignation upon his appointment as Sheriff April 5, 1884.

5th British Columbia election, 1886
Party	Candidate	Votes	%	±	Expenditures
Opposition	William Norman Bole	212	85.14%		unknown
Government	William Douglas Ferris	37	14.86%		unknown
Total valid votes		249	100.00%		
Total rejected ballots					
Turnout		%			

6th British Columbia election, 1890
Party	Candidate	Votes	%	±	Expenditures
Independent	John Cunningham Brown	530	52.28%		unknown
Government	Thomas Cunningham	321	37.72%		unknown
Total valid votes		851	100.00%		
Total rejected ballots					
Turnout		%			

7th British Columbia election, 1894
Party	Candidate	Votes	%	±	Expenditures
Government	David Samuel Curtis	574	49.14%		unknown
Opposition	James Buckham Kennedy	594	50.86%		unknown
Total valid votes		1,168	100.00%		
Total rejected ballots					
Turnout		%			

8th British Columbia election, 1898
Party	Candidate	Votes	%	±	Expenditures
Opposition	John Cunningham Brown	534	49.04%		unknown
Government	Alexander Henderson	555	50.96%		unknown
Total valid votes		1,089	100.00%		
Total rejected ballots					
Turnout		%			

9th British Columbia election, 1900
Party	Candidate	Votes	%	±	Expenditures
Government	John Cunningham Brown	628	53.77%		unknown
Conservative	Robie Lewis Reid	540	46.23%		unknown
Total valid votes		1,168	100.00%		
Total rejected ballots					
Turnout		%			

10th British Columbia election, 1903
Party	Candidate	Votes	%	±	Expenditures
Conservative	Thomas Gifford ^{2}	772	57.31%		unknown
Liberal	William H. Keary	575	42.69%		unknown
Total valid votes		1,347	100.00%		
Total rejected ballots					
Turnout		%			
^{2} The Vancouver Province results were 854 and 657.

11th British Columbia election, 1907
Party	Candidate	Votes	%	±	Expenditures
Conservative	Thomas Gifford^{1}	675	49.31%		unknown
Liberal	Frederick William Howay	547	39.96%		unknown
Canadian Labour Party	James Samuel Rainey	147	10.74%		unknown
Total valid votes		1,369	100.00%		
Total rejected ballots					
Turnout		%			

12th British Columbia election, 1909
Party	Candidate	Votes	%	±	Expenditures
Canadian Labour Party	Walter Dodd	165	9.92%		unknown
Conservative	Thomas Gifford	881	52.98%		unknown
Liberal	John Joseph Johnson	6,17	37.10%		unknown
Total valid votes		1,663	100.00%		
Total rejected ballots					
Turnout		%			

13th British Columbia election, 1912
Party	Candidate	Votes	%	±	Expenditures
Conservative	Thomas Gifford	1,004	72.28%		unknown
Liberal	George Kennedy	385	27.72%		unknown
Total valid votes		1,389	100.00%		
Total rejected ballots					
Turnout		%			

== See also ==
- List of British Columbia provincial electoral districts
- Canadian provincial electoral districts
