= Irving Hotel =

Historic hotel in Canada, established 1907

Iriving Hotel
- Interactive map of the Iriving Hotel area
- Former names: Broadway Hotel, Sunrise Hotel

General information
- Location: 101 East Hastings Street; Vancouver, British Columbia; V6A 4J1
- Coordinates: 49.281°N 123.101°W
- Opening: September 16, 1907

Technical details
- Floor count: 4

Other information
- Number of rooms: 42

Website
- www.phs.ca/locations/irving-hotel/

The Irving Hotel, also known as the Broadway Hotel and the Sunrise Hotel, is a historic hotel turned into supportive housing accommodations located at 101 East Hastings Street in the Downtown Eastside neighborhood of Vancouver, Canada.

== History ==
On September 16, 1907 the hotel was opened by Arthur Wellesley Vowell as luxury accommodations. Upon opening, the hotel featured 60 rooms, hot and cold water, a telephone system, an electric elevator, a workroom, and a dining room. The hotel was aimed at serving businessmen and other financial workers.

In October 1922, the hotel began renovations worth $1,500. The hotel reopened under new management on December 6, 1922. Under this new management, the name of the hotel was changed to the Broadway Hotel.

By the mid 1940s, the hotel began to fall on hard times financially as the city's economic center began to move away from the Downtown Eastside to the Financial District. By the 1950s, the hotel was known as a drug hotspot.

In 1974, the name of the hotel was again changed from the Broadway Hotel to the Sunrise Hotel. A new sign was installed to indicate the change. At this point, the ownership of the hotel had passed to Stewart Johnson. In the same year, Johnson was ordered to appear before Vancouver's social services committee due to liquor license and operational standard violations at the hotel. In this year, the hotel averaged 10 police incidents per month. This was an improvement from the previous year, which had an average of 15 to 20 police incidents per month.

In 1992, the hotel had one of the highest response rates by the Vancouver Police Department, only surpassed by the Balmoral Hotel. In 1999, a 22-year-old man originally from East Africa was stabbed outside of the hotel. He died on the ambulance ride to the hospital.

In 2001, the hotel was renovated as part of a project to revitalize the Downtown Eastside. This project was headed by Dys Architecture. Shortly after, a dental clinic operated by the University of British Columbia opened on the main floor. Also opened in the building was a radio station, laundromat, and coffee shop.

In 2016, the hotel was one of several buildings in the Downtown Eastside to undergo seismic renovations. These renovations were funded by the BC Housing Management Commission as part of a $143 million dollar project. A year later, the hotel received a merit award from the Vancouver Heritage Foundation recognizing the restoration of the hotel's exterior facade and its neon sign.

In August 2019, the hotel was one of 27 facilities that received displaced residence of Oppenheimer Park in a city and provincial wide sweep aimed to reduce homelessness.

The hotel currently functions as supportive housing run by the Portland Hotel Society. Residence are supported by mental health and support workers. In total, the hotel has 42 units.

== See also ==
- Downtown Eastside
