= Belcarra, County Mayo =

Belcarra Baile na Cora Ballycarra
- Village
- Location in Ireland
- Coordinates: 53°48′06″N 9°12′58″W
- Country: Ireland
- Province: Connacht
- County: County Mayo
- Elevation: 33 m (108 ft)

Population (2016)
  - Total: 228
- Time zone: UTC+0 (WET)
  - Summer (DST): UTC+1 (IST (WEST))
- Irish Grid Reference: M198842

Belcarra (Irish: Baile na Cora) is a village in County Mayo, Ireland about 10 kilometres (6.2 mi) south-east of the county town of Castlebar.

There are a number of shops in the village, including one general store, two bars (one open, one currently for sale), a hardware store and a butcher's. There is also a caravan and camping park, a Catholic church (St. Annes), a community centre, a primary school, a sports centre, an old fashioned basketball court & a riverside walk. The community centre plays host to several clubs, including a Foroige Club (organised for the young people of the village) and evening classes.

The small village received its first county award for the tidiest village in Mayo in 1977, going on to win the county Tidy Towns Award on fourteen occasions in total.

A new sports hall, built beside the community centre, was officially opened in April 2013.

Belcarra was twinned with Belcarra, British Columbia, Canada in 2007.

== People ==
- John Blowick (1888–1972), missionary and theologian, born Belcarra
- Luke McNicholas, professional footballer in EFL League One and League of Ireland

== See also ==
- List of towns and villages in Ireland
