= William Cosgrove Milby =

Canadian politician

William Cosgrove Milby (?-26 October 1877) was a Canadian politician. After being an unsuccessful candidate in the 1871 and 1875 provincial elections, he represented the electoral district of Kootenay from an August 24, 1876 by-election until his death in 1877.

Preceded by C. Gallagher (Ref.); A. W. Vowell (Ref.)	MLA of Kootenay; 1876-1877; With: C. Gallagher (Gouv.)	Succeeded by C. Gallagher (Ref.); R.L.T. Galbraith (Opp.)
