= Donald McGillivray (politician) =

Canadian farmer, merchant and politician

Donald McGillivray (December 2, 1838 – December 13, 1913) was a farmer, merchant and political figure in British Columbia. After being an unsuccessful candidate in the 1875 provincial election, he represented New Westminster in the Legislative Assembly of British Columbia from 1878 to 1882. Although he did not seek a second term in office in the 1882 provincial election, he did in the subsequent 1886 provincial election but was unsuccessful in his attempt at reelection.

He was born in Glengarry County, Ontario, the son of John McGillivray and Catherine Urquhart, was educated there and then moved with his family to New York City. In 1860, McGillivray came to British Columbia and worked for a time at the Puget Mill company in Port Gamble, Washington. Around 1863, he operated a pack train in the Cariboo District. McGillivray then sold his operation to the Western Union Telegraph Company. After that he was involved in farming, dairy and raising livestock, as well as operating as a general merchant in Chilliwack, until 1903 when he retired to Chilliwack. In 1889, McGillivray was named postmaster for Sumas. He was also a lay preacher in the Methodist church. He served as a magistrate and justice of the peace for New Westminster district. McGillivray was married twice: first to Susan Hall in 1868 and then to Julia Andrews in 1881. He died in Chilliwack at the age of 75.

== Electoral results ==
1875 British Columbia general election: New Westminster
Party	Candidate	Votes	%	Elected
Independent Government	Ebenezer Brown	154	26.15	✓
Government	William James Armstrong	153	25.98	✓
Reform caucus	Donald McGillivray	117	19.86	
Reform caucus	Jeremiah Rogers ^{2}	111	18.84	
Government	William M. Campbell	54	9.17	
Total valid votes		589	100.00	
^{2} Noted lumberman on False Creek/English Bay

1878 British Columbia general election: New Westminster
Party	Candidate	Votes	%	Elected
Government	Donald McGillivray	202	28.86	✓
Government	Wellington John Harris	171	24.43	✓
Opposition	James Orr	153	21.86	
Opposition	Henry Mathers	130	18.57	
Independent	James Kennedy	44	6.28	
Total valid votes		700	100.00	
Source: Elections BC
