= William Archibald Robertson =

Canadian politician

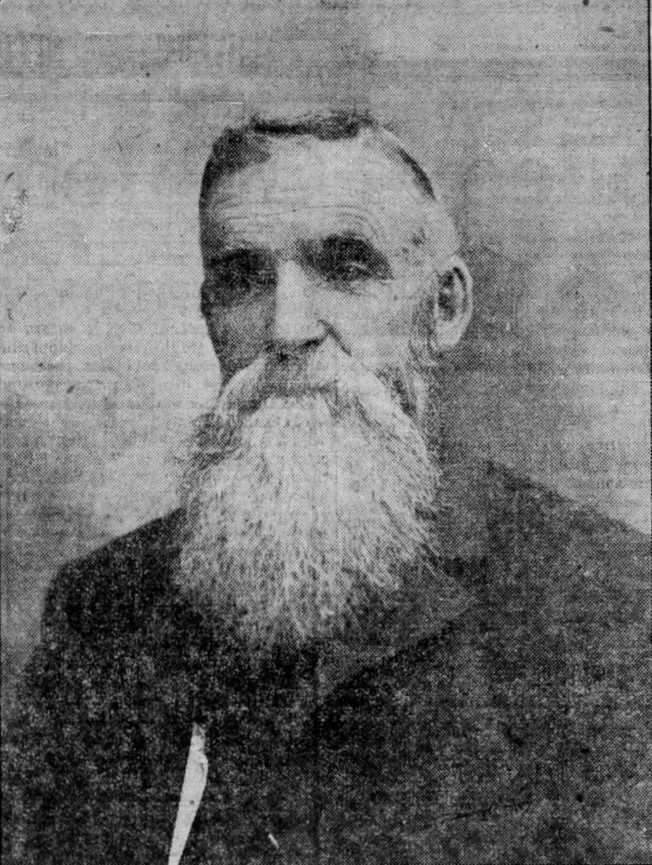

Member of the Legislative Assembly of British Columbia
- In office 1874–1875
- Constituency: Victoria

Personal details
- Born: 1832 Perthshire, Scotland
- Died: June 23, 1926 (aged 93) Victoria, British Columbia
- Political party: Independent
- Spouse: Matilda Martha Mayne (m. 1870)
- Occupation: Prospector, politician

William Archibald Robertson (1832 – June 23, 1926) was a prospector and Scottish-born political figure in British Columbia. He represented Victoria District in the Legislative Assembly of British Columbia from 1874 until his retirement at the 1875 provincial election. He never sought provincial office again.

He was born in Perthshire, the son of Alexander Robertson, and came to Upper Canada in 1834 with his family. They lived in Dunnville, then Toronto and finally Flamboro West. In 1862, Robertson joined the Union Army in the United States. After being captured and paroled, he resigned his commission and moved to British Columbia, settling in Victoria. He was elected to the assembly in a by-election in 1874, held after Arthur Bunster and Amor De Cosmos were elected to the Canadian House of Commons. Robertson was able to locate coal and silver deposits. In 1870, he married Matilda Martha Mayne. He died in Victoria at the age of 93.
