= Vancouver (electoral district) =

Former federal electoral district in British Columbia, Canada

British Columbia electoral district

Defunct federal electoral district
- Legislature: House of Commons
- District created: 1872
- District abolished: 1903
- First contested: 1872
- Last contested: 1900

Vancouver was a federal electoral district in British Columbia, Canada, that was represented in the House of Commons of Canada from 1872 to 1904. This riding was created for the 1872 federal election, following British Columbia's admission into the Canadian Confederation in 1871, and lasted until 1903.

The name of this riding is not derived from the contemporary City of Vancouver but from its first incarnation in 1871 as the riding representing Vancouver Island (excepting the Victoria-area ridings). The area that now makes up the City of Vancouver was part of the New Westminster electoral district at the time of the province joining Confederation.

== Members of Parliament ==
Parliament	Years	Member	Party
2nd	1872–1874	Francis Hincks	Liberal–Conservative
3rd	1874–1878	Arthur Bunster	Liberal
4th	1878–1882	Arthur Bunster	Liberal
5th	1882–1887	David William Gordon	Liberal–Conservative
6th	1887–1891	David William Gordon	Liberal–Conservative
7th	1891–1893	David William Gordon	Liberal–Conservative
7th	1893–1896	Andrew Haslam	Liberal–Conservative
8th	1896–1900	William Wallace Burns McInnes	Liberal
9th	1900–1904	Ralph Smith	Liberal
Riding dissolved into Nanaimo and Comox—Atlin

== Election results ==
1900 Canadian federal election
Party	Candidate	Votes	%	±%
Liberal	Ralph Smith	1,256	42.49	+1.53
Conservative	Clive Phillipps-Wolley	868	29.36	–29.67
Liberal	William Sloan	832	28.15	–12.82
Total valid votes		2,956	100.00	
Total rejected ballots		–		
Turnout		2,956	56.63	+0.09
Eligible voters		5,220		
Liberal hold		Swing		+2.51
Source: Library of Parliament

1896 Canadian federal election
Party	Candidate	Votes	%	±%
Liberal	William Wallace Burns McInnes	1,020	40.96	–
Conservative	Andrew Haslam	823	33.05	–
Conservative	James Haggart	647	25.98	–
Total valid votes		2,490	100.00	
Total rejected ballots		–		
Turnout		2,490	56.54	–
Eligible voters		4,404		
Liberal gain from Conservative		Swing		–
Source: Library of Parliament

Canadian federal by-election, 1893 On David William Gordon's death, 19 February 1893
Party	Candidate	Votes
Conservative	Andrew Haslam	acclaimed
Source: Library of Parliament

1891 Canadian federal election
Party	Candidate	Votes
Liberal–Conservative	David William Gordon	acclaimed
Source: Library of Parliament

1887 Canadian federal election
Party	Candidate	Votes	%	±%
Liberal–Conservative	David William Gordon	713	60.53	+0.26
Conservative	Joseph Phrys Planta	465	39.47	–20.79
Total valid votes		1,178	100.00	
Total rejected ballots		–		
Turnout		1,178	65.74	+2.92
Eligible voters		1,792		
Liberal–Conservative hold		Swing		–19.60
Source: Library of Parliament

1882 Canadian federal election
Party	Candidate	Votes	%	±%
Liberal–Conservative	David William Gordon	455	60.26	+23.03
Unknown	Arthur Bunster	300	39.74	–7.12
Total valid votes		755	100.00	
Total rejected ballots		–		
Turnout		755	62.81	+9.66
Eligible voters		1,202		
Liberal–Conservative gain from Liberal		Swing		+15.07
Source: Library of Parliament

1878 Canadian federal election
Party	Candidate	Votes	%	±%
Liberal	Arthur Bunster	336	46.86	–16.47
Liberal–Conservative	David William Gordon	267	37.24	–
Unknown	A.J. McLellan	74	10.32	–
Unknown	John Jessop	40	5.58	–
Total valid votes		717	100.00	
Total rejected ballots		–		
Turnout		717	53.15	–6.52
Eligible voters		1,349		
Liberal hold		Swing		–
Source: Library of Parliament

1874 Canadian federal election
Party	Candidate	Votes	%
Liberal	Arthur Bunster	209	63.33
Unknown	Alexander Caulfield Anderson	84	25.45
Unknown	J.W. Carey	37	11.21
Total valid votes		330	100.00
Total rejected ballots		–	
Turnout		330	59.67
Eligible voters		553	
Source: Library of Parliament

1872 Canadian federal election
Party	Candidate	Votes
Liberal–Conservative	Francis Hincks	acclaimed
Minister of Finance in the MacDonald government, unseated in Ontario and parachuted into this riding. Arthur Bunster and other local candidates stood down so that Hincks could have the seat by acclamation. He never saw British Columbia, despite being MP for one of its parliamentary seats for two years.
Source: Library of Parliament

== See also ==
- List of Canadian electoral districts
- Historical federal electoral districts of Canada
