= George Cowan (politician) =

Canadian politician

Member of the Legislative Assembly of British Columbia
- In office 1877–1890
- Constituency: Cariboo

Personal details
- Born: June 25, 1831 Leeds County, Ontario
- Died: September 3, 1910 (aged 79) Barkerville, British Columbia
- Party: Independent
- Occupation: farmer, miner

George Cowan (June 25, 1831 – September 3, 1910) was a Member of the Legislative Assembly of British Columbia, Canada, for the riding of Cariboo. He was first elected in a byelection in 1877 at the encouragement of George Walkem, the former and, at the time, future Premier. Cowan defeated the incumbent A.E.B. Davie, also a future Premier, who sought to win a seat in the House via the Cariboo byelection but who unlike Cowan did not have the advantages of Walkem's influence and support in the Cariboo riding (Davie would seek election successfully in the Lillooet riding in the subsequent general election of 1878). Cowan was re-elected consistently until retiring before the 1890 election.

He was born June 25, 1831, in Leeds County, Ontario, where his father was a farmer. At the age of 20, he went to the gold rush in Australia and worked in hardrock and placer mining for seven years, but returned to Ontario in 1859. In 1862, he heard news of the Cariboo Gold Rush and set out for British Columbia, arriving in Victoria in June. He mined successfully on Williams, Grouse and Antler Creeks but continued investment in mining depleted his resources. A Presbyterian, he was also a supporter of the government of John A. Macdonald federally, though there were no party alignments in British Columbia politics in his era. He died on September 3, 1910.

== See also ==
- Cariboo (provincial electoral district)
