= James Thomas McIlmoyl =

Canadian politician

James Thomas McIlmoyl (August 24, 1840 – March 27, 1933) was a farmer and political figure in British Columbia. After being defeated in an 1874 byelection, he represented Victoria in the Legislative Assembly of British Columbia from 1878 to 1882.

He was born in Upper Canada, of Scottish descent, was educated in Ontario and worked as an apprentice in a general store. McIlmoyl came to Victoria in May 1862 and then prospected and mined in the Cariboo District. Having achieved little success at mining, he returned to Victoria and, in 1870, purchased a farm where he raised livestock and grew grain. In the same year, he married Ann Simpson. In 1873, he was named a justice of the peace. He also served as secretary for the local school district. McIlmoyl was also a prominent member of the Ancient Order of United Workmen. He was defeated when he ran for reelection in 1882 and again in an 1888 byelection. He died in Victoria at the age of 92.
