= In the Sea of Sterile Mountains =

1974 book by James Morton

In the Sea of Sterile Mountains: The Chinese in British Columbia
- Author: James Morton
- Subject: History of Chinese Canadians in British Columbia
- Published: 1974
- Publisher: J. J. Douglas

In the Sea of Sterile Mountains: The Chinese in British Columbia is a 1974 book, written by James Morton and published by J. J. Douglas, that discusses the politics and historical details of Chinese Canadians in British Columbia from 1858 until the early 1970s.

In particular, the book addresses the non-Chinese British Columbia community's belief that the Chinese were a "problem" that needed to be dealt with. William Willmott, of the University of Canterbury, wrote that "it is evident from the nature of his source material that Dr. Morton did not set out to write a book about the Chinese in British Columbia, but only about white reactions to them."

== Background ==
The title of the book originates from a comment towards the province in an 1874 speech by Edward Blake, a member of the Parliament of Canada from South Bruce, Ontario. He called British Columbia "an inhospitable country, a sea of sterile mountains."

The book uses six documentaries and secondary sources total. The book uses extracts from two Royal Commission reports, as well as newspaper articles and editorials, particularly those of Canadian newspapers, spanning over 100 years. Newspapers represented include the British Columbian, Cariboo Sentinel, Colonist (Victoria), Gazette, Guardian (New Westminster), Herald, News (Vancouver), and the News Advertiser (Vancouver).

While James Morton is not a historian, Willmott described the collection of newspapers as a "labour of love," and "meticulous scholarship." Samantha J. Scott, the author of Text as Discourse: The Chinese in Canada in Historiographical Perspective, argued, "Morton relies at random upon a very minute selection of newspaper articles and government records."

== Contents ==
The book includes 10 chapters, an index, sixteen pages of black-and-white photographs in two sets, and a listing of key dates from 1843 to 1967, labeled "chronology." The dust jacket has three colours. Willmott stated that the chronology is "useful" and that the book overall is "well presented". Doug Beardsley of Books in Canada wrote that there are too few photographs in the book, but that overall the "beautifully produced" book is "handsome."

Each chapter is about an aspect of the British Columbian perception of the Chinese people, and the chapters are arranged in a chronological manner. Willmott characterized the organization as "arbitrary." The book discusses the origins of anti-East Asian sentiment stemming from the Opium War-era relations with China and the reasons for Chinese immigration to North America. Morton criticized Sir Wilfrid Laurier's preferential treatment of Japanese persons. Beardsley wrote "Morton is not afraid to pinpoint those most responsible for fanning the flames of prejudice."

The book does not have footnotes. The book has few notes of exact sources of materials, and the book does not have a list of newspapers and dates. Scott criticized the lack of footnotes, saying that there was "little accountability" with them. The book has five titles in its "Sources Other Than Newspapers" list; Willmott characterized two of them as being "trivial". Willmott argued that the overall lack of sourcing information decreases the amount of usefulness in this book for historians.

The author argued that the anti-Chinese campaigners in the 19th century would have had different opinions if they had lived in another era, and that using mid-20th century standards to judge the 19th century campaigners is not fair. Morton added that his book is "not a necessarily sociological history of the Chinese in the sea of sterile mountains nor, for that matter, a particularly accurate or complete one."

== Reception ==
Beardsley stated "Morton has documented it well by means of the newspapers of the time."

Willmott wrote that the book "sorely" lacked "scholarly judgment" and that it is "disappointingly limited" in terms of being a reference book.

Robert L. Worden, the author of a book review written for The Journal of Asian Studies, wrote that despite some issues with methodology and minor errors, "Morton's book is a good presentation of how British Columbians reacted to the Chinese". In regards to the methodology Worden argued that the first half of the book was "objective" and "reasonably well-documented" but that by the second half the author "seems to have been influenced by the same nine-teenth-century standards he weakly tries to justify". Worden also criticized the lack of "adequate expression of the Chinese view of their outcast position" by saying that it relied too much on Canadian newspaper articles.

Scott criticized the lack of footnotes, the sourcing methodology, "explicit dialogue with previous texts," and the sourcing itself; Scott asserted that therefore "the conclusions drawn consequently appear unreliable." Scott stated that the book's efforts to get "an international scope through loose connections between British Columbia, California and Australia" were positive and that Morton "tries to recognize the shortcomings of his own text". She concluded that "Although this text is outdated in many respects, the fact that it confronts discrimination toward the Chinese is testimony to an increasingly liberal climate of opinion."

== See also ==
- A White Man's Province
