= Josiah Charles Hughes =

Canadian politician (1843–1886)

Josiah Charles Hughes (May 5, 1843 – November 8, 1886) was a political figure in British Columbia. He represented New Westminster District in the Legislative Assembly of British Columbia from 1871 until his retirement at the 1875 provincial election. He served as the first deputy speaker of the Legislature in 1872. His first name also appears as Josias.

He was born in Omemee, Ontario, the son of J. L. Hughes, a native of Ireland, and Mary Ann Hall, and was educated in Peterborough and Cobourg. He came to British Columbia in 1862. Hughes worked as a clerk with a freighting company for about five years. He then worked as an accountant for about nine years. In 1871, he married Leonora Z. DeBeck. Hughes lived at Burrard Inlet. In 1876, he was named government agent at New Westminster. Hughes was named Indian Agent for the federal government at Netlakahtla in 1886. He became ill later that year and died at New Westminster at the age of 43. Hughes was also a prominent member of the British Columbia freemason lodge.
