= Alexander Rocke Robertson =

Canadian politician

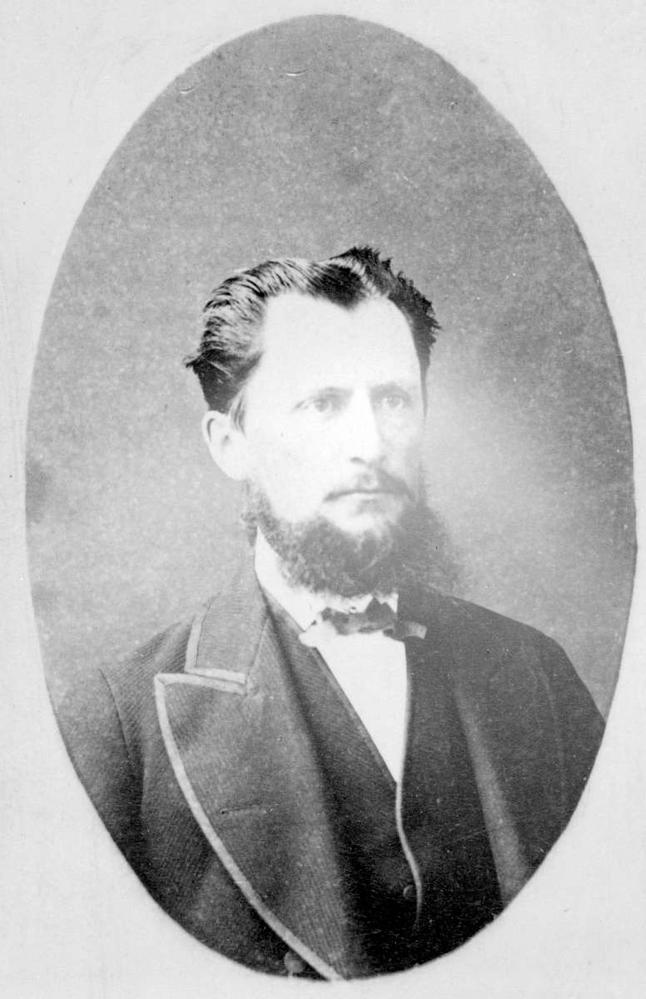
- Robertson pictured c. 1870s

Member of the Legislative Assembly of British Columbia for Esquimalt
- In office 1871–1875

Personal details
- Born: May 12, 1841 Chatham, Canada West
- Died: December 1, 1881 (aged 40) Victoria, British Columbia

Alexander Rocke Robertson (May 12, 1841 – December 1, 1881) was a Canadian lawyer, judge, and politician.

Born in Chatham, Canada West, the second son of Alexander Rocke Robertson and Effie Eberts, Robertson attended the Caradoc Academy and then studied law in Chatham. He was called to the bar in 1863 and practiced law in Windsor. He moved to British Columbia in 1864 arriving in Victoria, British Columbia. He found work as an editor for the newspaper Daily Chronicle since he was unable to practice as a lawyer since only British trained lawyers were allowed to practice. In 1864, the rules were changed and Robertson was admitted to the bar of Vancouver Island. He was a founding member of the Law Society of British Columbia in 1869.

In 1870, he served one term as mayor of Victoria. He was elected to the Legislative Assembly of British Columbia in 1871 for the electoral district of Esquimalt. He was appointed provincial secretary in the cabinet of John Foster McCreight. He did not run in 1875 returning to his law practice.

In 1880, he was appointed to the Supreme Court of British Columbia. He injured his knee while swimming in the summer of 1881 and had his leg amputated in November 1881. He died soon after in 1881.
