= Arthur Bunster =

Canadian politician (1831-1891)

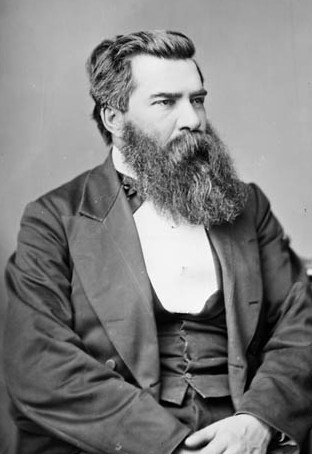

Member of the Canadian Parliament for Vancouver
- In office 1874–1882
- Preceded by: Francis Hincks
- Succeeded by: David William Gordon

Member of the Legislative Assembly of British Columbia for Victoria District
- In office 1871–1874

Personal details
- Born: 1827 Queen's County (now Laois), Ireland
- Died: 1891 (aged 59–60) San Francisco, California, US
- Party: Liberal
- Other political affiliations: British Columbia Liberal Party
- Spouse: Alinda Jane Pratt

Arthur Bunster (1831 – October 8, 1891) was a Canadian entrepreneur and Member of Parliament.

Bunster was born in Queen's County (now Laois), Ireland and was educated in Dublin, attending Trinity College. He came to Vancouver Island in 1856 and settled in Victoria, British Columbia. After trying his hand at several other ventures, Bunster purchased the Colonial Brewery in 1859. The brewery was destroyed in a fire and rebuilt, both in 1869.

In 1869, he served as a member of the town council for Victoria. He represented Nanaimo in the Legislative Council of British Columbia in 1871. Bunster, a Liberal, was elected in the two-member Victoria riding in British Columbia's first provincial election, in 1871. He was initially a candidate for the Vancouver seat (i.e. Vancouver Island, not today's City of Vancouver) in the federal election of 1872. However, Bunster and other local candidates stepped aside so that Minister of Finance Francis Hincks could win the seat by acclamation after he had lost his Ontario seat. Bunster did resign his seat in the provincial assembly in 1874 to contest and win the seat in the 1874 federal election. He was re-elected in 1878 but ultimately lost the seat in 1882. Bunster sold the brewery, to the original owners, in the same year. He later moved to San Francisco, where he entered real estate and later died in 1891, when he drowned in San Francisco Bay.

Bunster was opposed to immigration by Chinese people to Canada. In 1871, he proposed that a fifty dollar poll tax be imposed on Chinese persons working in British Columbia. The proposal was withdrawn because it fell outside of the powers of the colonial council. In 1874, he lobbied for legislation making it illegal for the Canadian Pacific Railway to hire persons with hair longer than 5.5 inches, a measure again aimed at the Chinese.

Bunster is also remembered for his 1878 fist-fight in the House of Commons with Liberal MP Guillaume Cheval.
