= James Atkinson Abrams =

Canadian politician (1844–1914)

James Atkinson Abrams (November 11, 1844 – April 24, 1914) was a business owner and political figure in British Columbia. He represented Nanaimo in the Legislative Assembly of British Columbia from 1878 to 1882. He retired at the 1882 provincial election and never again sought reelection to the Legislature.

He was born in Napanee, Ontario, apprenticed there as a tanner and came to Victoria in 1867. He worked as a foreman in two tanneries before moving to Nanaimo, where he established the Nanaimo Tanning Company in 1878, with himself as president. In the same year, he married Georgina Wenborn. In 1886, he became a partner in a business in Vancouver. Later that year, his business in Nanaimo was destroyed in a fire. Abrams served on Nanaimo City Council in 1889 and also served as a justice of the peace. He died in Cumberland at the age of 69.

Abrams Island, located west of Swindle Island, was named after him.
