= Henry Cogan =

Canadian politician

Henry Cogan was a Canadian politician. He represented the electoral district of Esquimalt from 1871 until 1875. After this one term in office, he never did seek reelection to the Legislature again.
