= John George Barnston =

Canadian politician

John George Barnston (April 17, 1835 – December 22, 1883) was a lawyer and political figure in British Columbia. He represented Cariboo in the Legislative Assembly of British Columbia from 1872 to 1875.

He was born in Red River, the son of George Barnston, who was at that time employed with the Hudson's Bay Company. Barnston studied law at McGill University, articled with Sir John Rose and was called to the Lower Canada bar in 1856. In 1858, he came to British Columbia. Barnston was elected to the assembly in an 1872 by-election held after Cornelius Booth was named to the bench. He did not seek a second term in the 1875 provincial election. He later lived in Nanaimo. Barnston died in Victoria.
