= Cowichan (electoral district) =

Electoral district in British Columbia, Canada

Cowichan was one of the first twelve electoral districts created when British Columbia became a Canadian province in 1871. It was located on southern Vancouver Island. Its last appearance on the husting was in 1920. It was then superseded by Cowichan-Newcastle, which appeared in provincial elections from 1924 to 1963, after which a revised riding is named Cowichan-Malahat.

== Demographics ==
Population, 2001	
Population change, 1996–2001	%
Area (km^{2})	
Population density (people per km^{2})	

== Notable MLAs ==
- William Smithe—served as seventh Premier of BC from 1883 to 1887.

== Election results ==
1st British Columbia election, 1871
Party	Candidate	Votes	%	±	Expenditures
Independent	John Paton Booth	47	23.98%		unknown
Independent	Archibald Dods	38	19.39%		unknown
Independent	Henry Fry	10	5.10%		unknown
Independent	Edwin Pimbury	24	12.24%		unknown
Independent	Thomas J. Skinner	10	9.69%		unknown
Independent	William Smithe	58	29.59%		unknown
Total valid votes		195	100.00%		

1875 British Columbia general election
Party	Candidate	Votes	%	Elected
Reform caucus	William Smithe	78	31.71	✓
Reform caucus	Edwin Pimbury	72	29.27	✓
Independent Government	William Henry Lomas	54	21.95	
Government	John Paton Booth	42	17.07	
Total valid votes		246	100.00	

3rd British Columbia election, 1878
Party	Candidate	Votes	%	±	Expenditures
Opposition	William Beaumont	45	15.41%	–	unknown
Opposition	John Paton Booth	66	22.60%	–	unknown
Government	Edwin Pimbury	84	28.77%	–	unknown
Government	William Smithe	97	33.22%	–	unknown
Total valid votes		292	100.00%		
Total rejected ballots					
Turnout		%			

4th British Columbia election, 1882 ^{1}
Party	Candidate	Votes	%	±	Expenditures
Government	Frederick Foord	41	28.67%	–	unknown
Opposition	William Smithe	102	71.33%	–	unknown
Total valid votes		143	100.00%		
Total rejected ballots					
Turnout		%			
^{1} Reduced to one member from two

British Columbia Byelection: Cowichan March 31, 1883 ^{2}
Party	Candidate	Votes	%	±	Expenditures
Government	William Smithe	Acclaimed	-.- %	–	unknown
Total valid votes		n/a	-.- %		
Total rejected ballots					
Turnout		%			
^{2} Reason for byelection was the resignation of William Smithe upon his appointment to the Executive Council (cabinet) January 29, 1883. Date of election is date of return of writs, as no polling day was required.

5th British Columbia election, 1886
Party	Candidate	Votes	%	±	Expenditures
Government	Henry Croft	Accl.	--%	–	unknown
Government	William Smithe	Accl.	--%	–	unknown
Total valid votes		309	100.00%		
Total rejected ballots					
Turnout		77.25%			

6th British Columbia election, 1890
Party	Candidate	Votes	%	±	Expenditures
Government	Henry Croft	146	34.27%	–	unknown
Government	Theodore Davie	178	41.78%	–	unknown
Government	Joseph Macdonald	102	23.94%	–	unknown
Total valid votes		426	100.00%		
Total rejected ballots					
Turnout		%			

7th General Election, 1894

For the 1894 election, the Cowichan area was part of the Cowichan-Alberni electoral district. It resumed by the name Cowichan the next election after that, in 1898:

8th British Columbia election, 1898
Party	Candidate	Votes	%	±	Expenditures
Opposition	William Herd	112	38.49%	–	unknown
Government	Theodore Davie	179	61.51%	–	unknown
Total valid votes		291	100.00%		
Total rejected ballots					
Turnout		%			

British Columbia provincial by-election, December 28, 1898
Party	Candidate	Votes	%	Elected
Opposition	William Russell Robertson	187	58.99	✓
Government	Colin Buchanan Sword	130	41.01	
Total valid votes		317	–	
Source: Elections BC

9th British Columbia election, 1900
Party	Candidate	Votes	%	±	Expenditures
Opposition	Charles Herbert Dickie	224	67.67%	–	unknown
Government	Walter Ford	107	32.33%	–	unknown
Total valid votes		331	100.00%		
Total rejected ballots					
Turnout		%			

10th British Columbia election, 1903
Party	Candidate	Votes	%	±	Expenditures
Opposition	John Newell Evans	225	51.14%	–	unknown
Government	Ernest Meeson Skinner	215	48.84%	–	unknown
Total valid votes		440	100.00%		
Total rejected ballots					
Turnout		%			

11th British Columbia election, 1907
Party	Candidate	Votes	%	±	Expenditures
Liberal	John Newell Evans	105	46.05%	–	unknown
Conservative	William Henry Hayward	123	53.95%		unknown
Total valid votes		228	100.00%		
Total rejected ballots					
Turnout		%			

12th British Columbia election, 1909
Party	Candidate	Votes	%	±	Expenditures
Liberal	John Newell Evans	175	32.41%	–	unknown
Conservative	William Henry Hayward	365	67.59%		unknown
Total valid votes		540	100.00%		
Total rejected ballots					
Turnout		%			

13th British Columbia election, 1912
Party	Candidate	Votes	%	±	Expenditures
Conservative	William Henry Hayward	441	80.04%		unknown
Liberal	Alexander Agnew Belford Herd	110	19.96%	–	unknown
Total valid votes		551	100.00%		
Total rejected ballots					
Turnout		%			

14th British Columbia election, 1916
Party	Candidate	Votes	%	±	Expenditures
Liberal	Kenneth Forrest Duncan	408	43.08%	–	unknown
Independent	William Henry Hayward	539	56.92%		unknown
Total valid votes		947	100.00%		
Total rejected ballots					
Turnout					

15th British Columbia election, 1920
Party	Candidate	Votes	%	±	Expenditures
Conservative	George Alfred Mosley Cheeke	1,032	47.40%		unknown
Independent	Kenneth Forrest Duncan	1,145	52.60%		unknown
Total valid votes		2,177	100.00%		
Total rejected ballots					
Turnout		%			

16th General Election, 1924

In the 1924 election, the Cowichan area became part of the new Cowichan-Newcastle riding.

== Sources ==
Elections BC website - historical election data
