= Arthur Wellesley Vowell =

Canadian politician

Arthur Wellesley Vowell (September 17, 1841 – September 26, 1918) was an Irish-born civil servant and political figure in British Columbia. He represented Kootenay in the Legislative Assembly of British Columbia from 1875 to 1876.

He was born in County Tipperary, the son of Richard Prendergast Vowell, was educated there and served in the Irish militia from 1858 to 1860. In 1862, he came to British Columbia, travelling to Cariboo, where he tried his hand at mining to little avail. Vowell then moved to Victoria, staying there until 1866 and subsequently moving to Big Bend. He was named chief constable there, serving in that post until 1872, when he was named gold commissioner and stipendiary magistrate for the Kootenay district.

In 1873, he was transferred to Omineca in the same position; then, in 1874, he was sent to Cassiar. He resigned his post in autumn of that year. Vowell resigned his seat in the assembly after he was named gold commissioner and stipendiary magistrate for Cassiar. In 1884, he was transferred to Kootenay. Vowell resigned these posts in 1889 after being named superintendent of Indian Affairs for British Columbia, a federal position. In 1898, he was also assigned the duties of Indian Reserve Commissioner after the retirement of Peter O'Reilly. During Vowell's tenure, in 1907, British Columbia rejected the allocation of any additional land to native reserves.

In 1906, Vowell commissioned the opening of a 4-story luxury hotel named the Irving Hotel, located at Columbia and Hastings in Vancouver. The hotel was opened in September 1907, with the inscription "the Vowell" located on the building.

Vowell resigned his federal positions in March 1910. He died in Victoria at the age of 77.
