= Robert Leslie Thomas Galbraith =

Canadian politician

Robert Leslie Thomas "'R.L.T." Galbraith (December 23, 1841 – May 12, 1924) was an Irish-born merchant and political figure in British Columbia. He represented Kootenay in the Legislative Assembly of British Columbia from 1877 to 1886.

== Biography ==
Robert Leslie Thomas was born in Raphoe, County Donegal in 1841, the son of Professor Galbraith, of Scottish descent. He was educated at the Royal College there. In 1870, he came to Fort Steele on the Kootenay River, at that time known as Galbraith's Ferry, to join his brother John who was operating a ferry and general store there.

After being an unsuccessful candidate in the 1875 provincial election and an 1876 by-election, Galbraith was first elected to the assembly in an 1877 by-election held following the death of William Cosgrove Milby. He was chairman of the assembly's Committee of Ways and Means and Supplies. He did not seek a fourth term in the Legislature in the 1886 provincial election. Galbraith later served as justice of the peace and was Indian agent for the southeast part of the province. He became known as the "Grand Old Man of the Kootenays".

In 1913, at the age of 72, Galbraith married Ella Fleming, a 39-year-old woman from England.

Robert Leslie Thomas Galbraith died in Fort Steele on May 12, 1924.
