= Kootenay (provincial electoral district) =

Defunct provincial electoral district in British Columbia, Canada

Kootenay was a provincial electoral district in the Canadian province of British Columbia from 1871 to 1890. It was originally a two-member riding until the 1875 election; from 1878, it was a one-member seat until its partition for the 1890 election into East Kootenay and West Kootenay. For the 1966 election, the riding-name was re-established, but the area described was only the East Kootenay and included none of the West Kootenay.

== Election results 1871–1890 ==
1st British Columbia election, 1871
Party	Candidate	Votes	%	±	Expenditures
Independent	John Andrew Mara	17	43.59%		unknown
Independent	William Cosgrove Milby	9	23.08%		unknown
Independent	Charles Todd	13	13.33%		unknown
Total valid votes		39	100.00%		

1875 British Columbia general election
Party	Candidate	Votes	%	Elected
Reform caucus	Robert Leslie Thomas Galbraith	16	25.40%	
Reform caucus	Charles Gallagher	16	25.40%	✓
Government	William Cosgrove Milby	15	23.80%	
Reform caucus	Arthur Wellesley Vowell	48	23.88%	✓
Total valid votes		63		
To break a three-way tie, the Returning Officer cast the deciding votes for Gallagher and Vowell (Victoria Colonist 24 October 1875)

1878 British Columbia general election
Party	Candidate	Votes	Elected
Opposition (?)	Robert Leslie Thomas Galbraith	Accl.	✓
Opposition (?)	Charles Gallagher	Accl.	✓
Total valid votes		187	

4th British Columbia election, 1882 ^{1}
Party	Candidate	Votes	%	±	Expenditures
Government	Robert Leslie Thomas Galbraith	Accl.	--%	–	unknown
Total valid votes		--	--%		
Total rejected ballots					
Turnout					
^{1} Seat reduced to one member from two.

5th British Columbia election, 1886
Party	Candidate	Votes	%	±	Expenditures
Government	James Baker	111	60.00%	–	unknown
Opposition	William M. Brown	74	40.00%	–	unknown
Total valid votes		185	100.00%		
Total rejected ballots					
Turnout		%			

The riding was partitioned for the 1894 election.

== Election results 1966–1986 ==
The riding-name was re-established in time for the 1966 election, but covered only the East Kootenay region rather than the entire Kootenays as had been the case in its first incarnation.

28th British Columbia election, 1966
Party	Candidate	Votes	%	±	Expenditures
Social Credit	Robert Owen Jones	3,070	34.89%	–	unknown
Liberal	Henry Cartmell (Harry) McKay	2,123	24.13%		unknown
NDP	Leo Thomas Nimsick	3,605	40.98%		unknown
Total valid votes		8.798	100.00%		
Total rejected ballots		54			
Turnout		%			

29th British Columbia election, 1969
Party	Candidate	Votes	%	±	Expenditures
Social Credit	J. Harry Broadhurst	4,267	38.26%	–	unknown
Liberal	Henry Nelson	2,604	23.35%		unknown
NDP	Leo Thomas Nimsick	4,282	38.39%		unknown
Total valid votes		11,153	100.00%		
Total rejected ballots		173			
Turnout		%			

30th British Columbia election, 1972
Party	Candidate	Votes	%	±	Expenditures
Liberal	Harry Edwards Caldwell	1,872	13.64%		unknown
NDP	Leo Thomas Nimsick	6,065	44.20%		unknown
Social Credit	Ronald Powell	1,615	11.77%	–	unknown
PC	David John Reeves	4,169	30.38%		unknown
Total valid votes		13,721	100.00%		
Total rejected ballots		180			
Turnout		%			

31st British Columbia election, 1975
Party	Candidate	Votes	%	±	Expenditures
Social Credit	George Wayne Haddad	7,915	52.29%	–	unknown
NDP	Leo Thomas Nimsick	7,223	47.71%		unknown
Total valid votes		15,138	100.00%		
Total rejected ballots		220			
Turnout		%			

32nd British Columbia election, 1979
Party	Candidate	Votes	%	±	Expenditures
PC	Roy Wilburn Paul	975	7.80%		unknown
Social Credit	Terence Patrick Segarty	6,167	49.37%	–	unknown
NDP	Douglas Wayne Right	5,350	42.83%		unknown
Total valid votes		12,492	100.00%		
Total rejected ballots		102			
Turnout		%			

33rd British Columbia election, 1983
Party	Candidate	Votes	%	±	Expenditures
NDP	Harry Edwin Mathias	8,245	47.36%		unknown
Liberal	Kory Palmer	374	1.99%		unknown
Social Credit	Terence Patrick Segarty	8,819	50.65%	–	unknown
Total valid votes		17,411	100.00%		
Total rejected ballots		208			
Turnout		%			

34th British Columbia election, 1986
Party	Candidate	Votes	%	±	Expenditures
NDP	Kathleen Anne Edwards	8,000	47.94%		unknown
Liberal	Paul R. Kershaw	539	3.23%		unknown
Social Credit	Terence Patrick Segarty	7,649	45.84%	–	unknown
Progressive Conservative	James G. Smith	499	2.99%		unknown
Total valid votes		16,687	100.00%		
Total rejected ballots		271			
Turnout		%			

== See also ==
- List of British Columbia provincial electoral districts
- Canadian provincial electoral districts
