= Cornelius Booth =

Canadian politician (1830–1903)

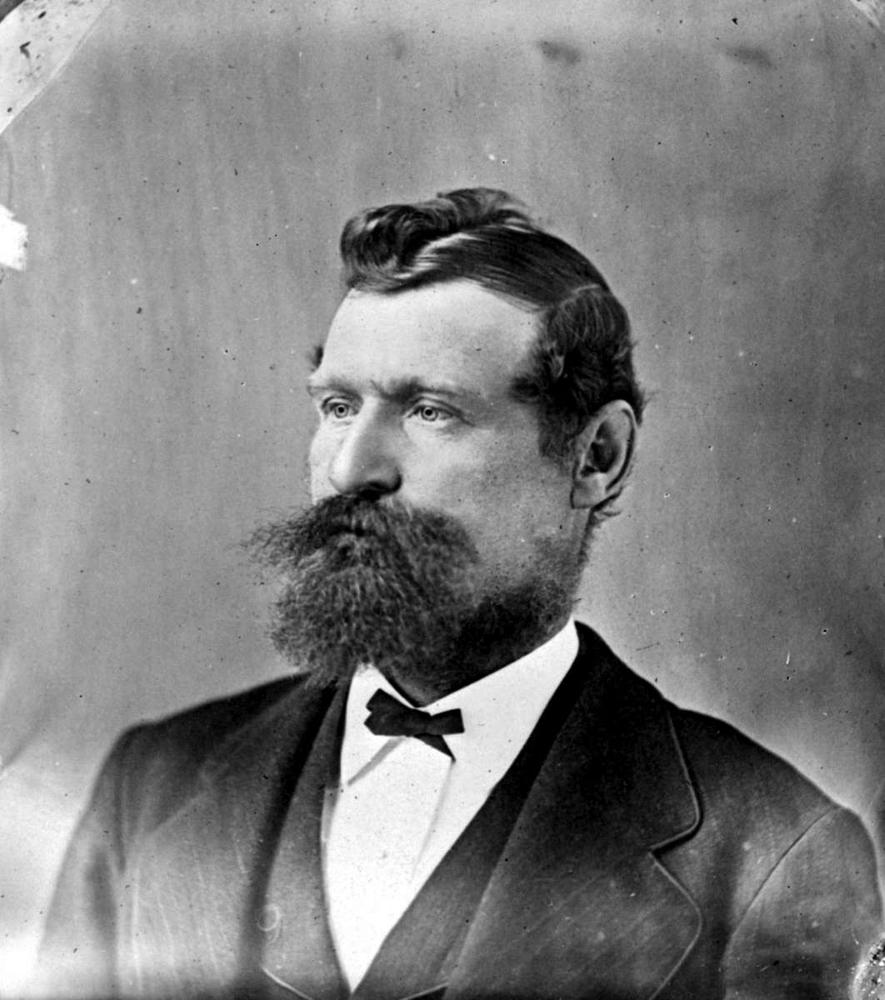
- Booth pictured in the 1870s

Member of the Legislative Assembly of British Columbia
- In office 1871–1872
- Constituency: Cariboo

Personal details
- Born: December 28, 1830 Ireland
- Died: May 31, 1903 (aged 72) Victoria, British Columbia
- Party: Independent
- Spouse: Mary Ann Carter
- Occupation: provincial assessor

Cornelius Booth (December 28, 1830 – May 31, 1903) was a Canadian politician. He served in the Legislative Assembly of British Columbia from 1871 to 1872 from the electoral district of Cariboo. He resigned in April 1872 due to his appointment as "Clerk to the Bench at Kootenay."
