= Frederick W. Williams =

Canadian politician

Frederick W. Williams was the Speaker of the Legislative Assembly of British Columbia from 1878 to 1882. He represented the electoral district of Esquimalt from 1875 until his retirement at the 1882 provincial election. He never sought provincial office again.
