= John Evans (British Columbia politician) =

Canadian politician

Member of the Legislative Assembly of British Columbia from Cariboo
- In office 1875–1879
- Preceded by: John George Barnston

Personal details
- Born: January 25, 1816; Machynlleth, Wales
- Died: August 25, 1879 (63); Stanley, British Columbia, Canada

John Evans (January 25, 1816 – August 25, 1879) was a British-Canadian miner and political figure in British Columbia. He represented Cariboo in the Legislative Assembly of British Columbia from 1875 to 1879.

== Early life ==
Evans was born and raised in Machynlleth, Wales. He worked in Manchester as a young man and later moved to Tremadog with his family.

== Career ==
Evans came to British Columbia in 1863 with a group of Welsh miners. The venture was unsuccessful but Evans remained, continuing to prospect for gold and also working as a mining and land surveyor. He ran unsuccessfully for a seat on the Legislative Council for the Colony of British Columbia in 1863 and 1865 and for a seat in the provincial assembly in 1871 before being elected in 1875. Evans was married three times: twice in Wales, first to Martha Evans in 1840 and then to Ann Thomas in 1842, and later to Catherine Jones in 1877 in Victoria. He died in office in Stanley at the age of 63.
