= Edwin Pimbury =

Canadian politician

Edwin Pimbury (January 3, 1834 – April 6, 1909) was an English-born farmer, merchant and political figure in British Columbia. He represented Cowichan in the Legislative Assembly of British Columbia from 1875 to 1882.

He was born in Hyde, Gloucestershire, the son of Samuel Cosburn Pimbury, and was educated in Minchinhampton. Pimbury apprenticed in the drug business and, unable to purchase a business in England, travelled to Portland, Maine and then to Portage, Wisconsin, where he established a business. In 1856, following a downturn in the economy, he journeyed to California, but finding his opportunities there limited, went prospecting for gold in Arizona. He then left for British Columbia with his brother. Pimbury farmed for a time with his brothers near Victoria but then took a job in a drug business in Victoria. After eleven years, he returned to farming. He ran unsuccessfully for a seat in the assembly in 1871. Pimbury later established a retail business selling drugs, books and stationery at Nanaimo. He did not run for reelection in 1882 due to the demands of his business. Pimbury was a director of the Waterworks Company at Nanaimo and also served as a justice of the peace. He died in Duncan at the age of 75, having never again stood as a candidate in a provincial election in British Columbia.
