= Ebenezer Brown =

Canadian politician

Ebenezer Brown (c. 1824 – June 5, 1883) was an English-born wholesale merchant and political figure in British Columbia. He represented New Westminster from 1875 to 1878 and New Westminster City from 1878 to 1881 in the Legislative Assembly of British Columbia.

He was educated in England and came to British Columbia in 1858. A stonemason, he erected the border monument at the Point Roberts-Tsawwassen boundary.

== Political life ==
He served on the municipal council for New Westminster. Brown was president of the province's Executive Council (the cabinet) from February to September 1876. He resigned his seat in the assembly in November 1881 due to poor health. Another version from a fellow MLA says he retired because of conflict of interest issues relating to railway developments. Brown died two years later in New Westminster at the age of 59.

Brownsville across the Fraser River from New Westminster was named after Ebenezer Brown who built the first hotel there and also owned a wharf.

== Electoral results ==
1875 British Columbia general election: New Westminster
Party	Candidate	Votes	%	Elected
Independent Government	Ebenezer Brown	154	26.15	✓
Government	William James Armstrong	153	25.98	✓
Reform caucus	Donald McGillivray	117	19.86	
Reform caucus	Jeremiah Rogers ^{2}	111	18.84	
Government	William M. Campbell	54	9.17	
Total valid votes		589	100.00	
^{2} Noted lumberman on False Creek/English Bay
