= William Smithe =

Premier of British Columbia from 1883 to 1887

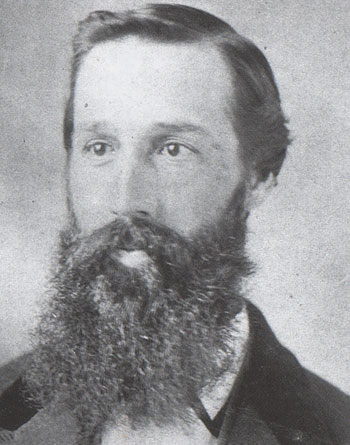
- Hon. William Smithe

7th Premier of British Columbia
- In office January 29, 1883 – March 28, 1887
- Monarch: Victoria
- Lieutenant Governor: Clement Francis Cornwall; Hugh Nelson
- Preceded by: Robert Beaven
- Succeeded by: Alexander Edmund Batson Davie

MLA for Cowichan
- In office October 16, 1871 – March 28, 1887 Serving with John Paton Booth, Edwin Pimbury, Henry Croft
- Preceded by: first member
- Succeeded by: Henry Fry

Personal details
- Born: William Smith; June 30, 1842 Matfen, England
- Died: March 28, 1887 (aged 44) Victoria, British Columbia
- Party: None
- Spouse: Martha Kier

William Smithe (born William Smith; June 30, 1842 in Matfen, Northumberland, England – March 28, 1887 in Victoria, British Columbia) was a British Columbia politician and the seventh premier of British Columbia, from 1883 to 1887.

Smithe was born William Smith in England and moved to Canada in his youth, settling on Vancouver Island in 1862 as a farmer. In 1871, he ran and won a seat in the new provincial legislature. There he added the final "e" to his name. Amor De Cosmos, also then a member of the legislature, had likewise been born as "William Smith," but in a characteristically grand gesture had legally adopted instead a new name meaning "Love of the Universe."

By 1875 Smithe had become the informal leader of the opposition to Premier George Anthony Walkem's government, but yielded the leadership to Andrew Charles Elliott. Smithe was in Elliott's short lived cabinet from 1876 to 1878 before returning to the opposition benches and again became opposition leader.

In 1883, Smithe became the premier of British Columbia and initiated the Great Potlatch era in which governments made generous grants of public resources and land to private entrepreneurs. He also settled disputes with the federal government which had stalled the construction of the transcontinental Canadian Pacific Railway. Asked on one occasion whether he thought British Columbia should be annexed to the United States, he suggested instead that Washington and Oregon be annexed to British Columbia. Smithe remained premier until he died in office in 1887.
