= John Ash (Canadian politician) =

Canadian politician

MLA to Comox
- In office February 15, 1872 – June 13, 1882
- Preceded by: Office established
- Succeeded by: William Munro Dingwall

Personal details
- Born: December 24, 1822 Ormskirk, United Kingdom
- Died: April 17, 1886 (aged 63)

John Ash (December 24, 1822 – April 17, 1886) was a Canadian medical doctor and politician.

== Early life ==
John Ash was born December 24, 1822, in Ormskirk, United Kingdom to father William Ash. He attended Guy's Hospital in Southwark, London, where he met John Sebastian Helmcken, a future key player in the joining of British Columbia to the Canadian Confederation. In 1845 Ash became a member of the Royal College of Surgeons and the Worshipful Society of Apothecaries. From 1849 to 1860, he practised medicine Coxwold, before emigrating to Canada in 1862, arriving in Victoria, British Columbia. On approximately July 31, 1863, Ash's wife Dorothy Agar gave birth to a daughter, Annie Freer, in the Esquimalt home of John Sebastian Helmcken.

In 1874, Ash's wife Dorothy died. He married the next year, but his new wife Adelaide died in 1881 of malaria. After his retirement from politics, Ash continued to practise medicine, until his death from apoplexy on April 17, 1886, at age 63.

== Political career ==
In 1865 Ash was elected as a junior member for the Esquimalt District in the Legislative Assembly of Vancouver Island. It is believed that the reason he gained this seat was because of his connections with John Sebastian Helmcken and the Hudson's Bay Company (whose employees made up the majority of the constituency's population). In effect, Ash owed his position in the House of Assembly to these two connections. Upon the union of the two colonies of Vancouver Island and British Columbia in 1866, the House of Assembly of Vancouver Island was abolished. In 1868, Ash's only child Annie died of diphtheria, aged five. After British Columbia entered the Canadian Confederation in 1871, Ash was elected to the provincial legislative representing the riding of Comox the very next year. On December 23, 1872, he was immediately appointed to the Executive Council in Amor De Cosmos's government as provincial secretary (as well as minister of mines from 1874), and retained this position until the resignation of the government of George Anthony Walkem on January 27, 1876. In 1882 Ash decided to not seek re-election.
