= William James Armstrong =

Canadian politician

William James Armstrong (October 31, 1826 – December 8, 1915) was a merchant, miller and politician in British Columbia. He represented New Westminster District from 1871 to 1878 and New Westminster City from 1881 to 1884 in the Legislative Assembly of British Columbia.

He was born in Peterborough, Upper Canada the son of William Armstrong, a native of Ireland, and Elizabeth Brown, and was educated there. He moved to Grass Valley, California, where he was involved in mining, with his family in 1852. In 1858, the family moved to Langley, British Columbia. The following year, Armstrong settled in Queensborough (later New Westminster) and opened a general store. He was elected to the first municipal council for New Westminster in 1860. In 1861, he married Honor Chenhalls Ladner. Armstrong was president of the municipal council (mayor) for New Westminster from 1866 to 1867 and from 1869 to 1871. He served in the provincial cabinet as Minister of Finance and Agriculture from 1872 to 1876. Armstrong was defeated when he ran for the New Westminster City seat in the assembly in 1878. He was reelected in a by-election held in 1881 after Ebenezer Brown resigned his seat due to ill health. From 1881 to 1882, he served in the cabinet as Provincial Secretary. In 1884, he resigned his seat in the assembly to accept an appointment as sheriff for Westminster County.

Armstrong built a flour mill at New Westminster in 1867 and a sawmill in 1876. He also served as a justice of the peace.

He died in New Westminster at the age of 89.

== Electoral results ==
1875 British Columbia general election: New Westminster
Party	Candidate	Votes	%	Elected
Independent Government	Ebenezer Brown	154	26.15	✓
Government	William James Armstrong	153	25.98	✓
Reform caucus	Donald McGillivray	117	19.86	
Reform caucus	Jeremiah Rogers ^{2}	111	18.84	
Government	William M. Campbell	54	9.17	
Total valid votes		589	100.00	
^{2} Noted lumberman on False Creek/English Bay
