= George Anthony Walkem =

Premier of British Columbia (1874–1876; 1878–1882)

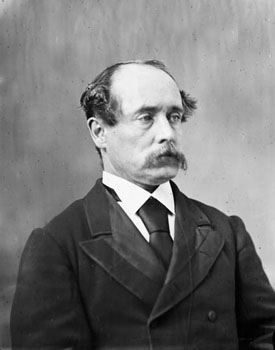
- Hon. George Anthony Walkem in 1875

3rd & 5th Premier of British Columbia
- In office June 25, 1878 – June 6, 1882
- Monarch: Victoria
- Lieutenant Governor: Albert Norton Richards; Clement Francis Cornwall
- Preceded by: Andrew Charles Elliott
- Succeeded by: Robert Beaven
- In office February 11, 1874 – January 27, 1876
- Monarch: Victoria
- Lieutenant Governor: Joseph Trutch
- Preceded by: Amor de Cosmos
- Succeeded by: Andrew Charles Elliott

Member of the Legislative Assembly for Cariboo
- In office October 16, 1871 – July 24, 1882 Serving with Joseph Hunter, Cornelius Booth, Alexander Edmund Batson Davie, John Evans, George Cowan
- Preceded by: First member
- Succeeded by: Robert McLeese

Personal details
- Born: November 15, 1834 Newry, Ireland
- Died: January 13, 1908 (aged 73) Victoria, British Columbia, Canada
- Party: None
- Spouse: Sophia Edith Rhodes (m. 1879)
- Cabinet: First Walkem ministry Second Walkem ministry

George Anthony Walkem (Note: Sometimes given as George Anthony Boomer Walkem) (November 15, 1834 – January 13, 1908) was a British Columbian politician and jurist.

== Life and career ==
Born in Newry, Ireland, Walkem moved to then Colony of British Columbia in 1862 and served as a member of the Colonial Assembly (Cariboo East and Quesnel Forks District) from 1864 to 1866 and the appointed Legislative Council (Cariboo) from 1866 to 1870. He was a supporter of Canadian Confederation. With the admission of the colony into Canada, Walkem was elected to the provincial legislature from the riding of Cariboo in 1871 and became attorney general in the cabinet of Premier Amor De Cosmos and succeeded him to become the third premier of British Columbia.

Walkem's government pressured Ottawa to meet its commitment to build a railway to the Pacific Ocean but was initially unsuccessful. Walkem fought the 1875 election facing charges that he had failed to secure railway construction and had increased the province's debts by engaging in expensive public works projects. The government was re-elected with a reduced majority but he was also accused of plunging the province into debt by engaging in public works that it could ill afford (see Lillooet Cattle Trail). Nevertheless, his government was returned, albeit with a reduced majority but grievances continued.

The Walkem government's financial difficulties mounted and his government lost a Motion of No Confidence in early 1876 and was replaced by a new government formed by Andrew Charles Elliott with Walkem becoming Leader of the Opposition. Elliot's government was unstable and collapsed within two years leading to early elections which allowed Walkem to form a second government in 1878 as the fifth premier, with a comfortable majority.

The new Walkem government opposed "cheap Chinese labour" and inserted a clause banning the hiring of Chinese workers in all its contracts. The government also attempted to levy a special tax restricted to Chinese which was struck down by the Supreme Court of Canada. In the election campaign Walkem had threatened to lead British Columbia out of confederation if the federal government did not commence construction of the promised railway by 1879. The provincial government appealed directly to London resulting in the British government pressuring Ottawa to fulfill the deal.

In 1882 Walkem narrowly survived a Motion of No Confidence due to rising costs of a project to build a dock on Vancouver Island but lost the subsequent election due to hostility from Islanders who had a disproportionate number of seats in the legislature and thus were able to bring down the Walkem government.

Walkem was appointed to the Supreme Court of British Columbia upon retiring from politics in 1882, sitting on the court until his retirement in 1904.

George Anthony Walkem is interred in the Ross Bay Cemetery in Victoria, British Columbia.

== See also ==
- First Walkem ministry
- Second Walkem ministry
