= 6th Parliament of British Columbia =

The 6th Legislative Assembly of British Columbia sat from 1891 to 1894. The members were elected in the British Columbia general election held in June 1890. John Robson served as premier until his death in 1892. Theodore Davie succeeded Robson as premier.

There were four sessions of the 6th Legislature:

Session	Start	End
1st	January 15, 1891	April 20, 1891
2nd	January 28, 1892	April 23, 1892
3rd	January 26, 1893	April 12, 1893
4th	January 18, 1894	April 12, 1894

David Williams Higgins served as speaker.

== Members of the 6th Parliament ==
The following members were elected to the assembly in 1891:

Member	Electoral district	Party	First elected / previously elected	No.# of term(s)
Thomas Fletcher	Alberni	Government (Note: Government candidates supported the Robson administration)	1890	1st term
Joseph Mason	Cariboo	Government	1886	2nd term
John Robson	Cariboo	Government	1871, (Note: Nanaimo) 1882	4th term*
Samuel Augustus Rogers	Cariboo	Government	1890	1st term
Ithiel Blake Nason (1891)	Cariboo	Government	1888, 1891	2nd term*
Hugh Watt (1892)	Cariboo	Government	1892	1st term
William Adams (1894)	Cariboo	Government	1894	1st term
Robert Hanley Hall	Cassiar	Government	1890	1st term
Joseph Hunter	Comox	Government	1871, 1890	2nd term*
Henry Croft	Cowichan	Government	1886	2nd term
Theodore Davie	Cowichan	Government	1882	3rd term
James Baker	East Kootenay	Government	1886	2nd term
David Williams Higgins	Esquimalt	Government	1886	2nd term
Charles Edward Pooley	Esquimalt	Government	1882	3rd term
John Paton Booth	The Islands	Government	1871, (Note: Cowichan) 1890	2nd term*
Alfred Wellington Smith	Lillooet	Government	1889	2nd term
David Alexander Stoddart	Lillooet	Opposition (Note: opposed to the Robson administration)	1890	1st term
William Thomas Forster	Nanaimo	Labour (Note: Both Labour candidates were nominated by the Miners' and Mine Labourers' Protective Association (MMLPA))	1890	1st term
Colin Campbell McKenzie	Nanaimo	Farmer (Note: A "farmers' candidate" endorsed by the MMLPA)	1890	1st term
Thomas Keith	Nanaimo City	Labour	1890	1st term
John Cunningham Brown	New Westminster City	Independent	1890	1st term
Francis Lovett Carter-Cotton	Vancouver City	Opposition	1890	1st term
James Welton Horne	Vancouver City	Independent	1890	1st term
George William Anderson	Victoria	Government	1886	2nd term
David McEwen Eberts	Victoria	Government	1890	1st term
Robert Beaven	Victoria City	Opposition	1871	6th term
John Grant	Victoria City	Opposition	1882	3rd term
George Lawson Milne	Victoria City	Opposition	1890	1st term
John Herbert Turner	Victoria City	Government	1886	2nd term
James M. Kellie	West Kootenay	Independent	1890	1st term
Thomas Edwin Kitchen	Westminster	Opposition	1890	1st term
James Punch	Westminster	Opposition	1890	1st term
Colin Buchanan Sword (1890)	Westminster	Opposition	1890	1st term
John Robson (Note: Elected in both Westminster and Cariboo, choosing to sit for Cariboo)	Westminster	Government	1871, 1882	4th term*
George Bohun Martin	Yale	Government	1882	3rd term
Charles Augustus Semlin	Yale	Opposition	1871, 1882	4th term*
Forbes George Vernon	Yale	Government	1875, 1886	4th term*

== By-elections ==
By-elections were held for the following members appointed to the provincial cabinet, as was required at the time:

- James Baker Minister of Education and Immigration, acclaimed July 30, 1892

By-elections were held to replace members for various other reasons:

Electoral district	Member elected	Election date	Reason
Westminster	Colin Buchanan Sword	November 20, 1890	John Robson resigned, elected in both Westminster and Cariboo
Cariboo	Ithiel Blake Nason	March 20, 1891	death of Joseph Mason on December 2, 1890
Cariboo	Hugh Watt	November 30, 1892	death of John Robson on June 29, 1892
Cariboo	William Adams	November 30, 1893	death of Ithiel Blake Nason on May 27, 1893
