= 1890 British Columbia general election =

Canadian provincial election

- June 1890

33 seats in the Legislative Assembly of British Columbia
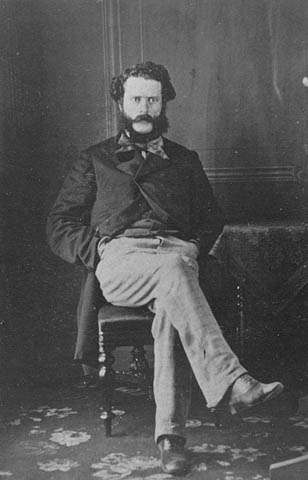
	First party	Second party
Leader	John Robson	N/A
Party	Government	Opposition
Leader since	August 2, 1889	N/A
Seats won	19 (Note: John Robson won two seats, meaning the government caucus held 19 seats, but was made up of 18 people.)	8
	Third party	Fourth party
Leader	N/A	N/A
Party	Labour	Farmer
Leader since	N/A	N/A
Seats won	2	1

The 1890 British Columbia general election was held in 1890. The number of members was increased for this election from 27 in the previous election to 33, although the number of ridings was decreased to 18.

== Political context ==
=== Non-party system ===
There were to be no political parties in the new province. The designations "Government" and "Opposition" and "Independent" (and variations on these) functioned in place of parties, but they were very loose and do not represent formal coalitions, more alignments of support during the campaign. "Government" meant in support of the current Premier; "Opposition" meant campaigning against him, and often enough the Opposition would win and immediately become the Government.

Although Labour as a party had run candidates in previous election, this election saw the first victories by Labour candidates (in Nanaimo and Nanaimo City), and a "Farmer" candidate (in the second Nanaimo seat). There were five successful independents.

=== The Robson Government ===
The government of newspaperman John Robson received a mandate after assuming power the year before. Robson died in office in 1892, yielding to Theodore Davie.

=== Byelections not shown ===
Any changes due to byelections are shown below the main table showing the theoretical composition of the House after the election. A final table showing the composition of the House at the dissolution of the Legislature at the end of this Parliament can be found below the byelections. The main table represents the immediate results of the election only, not changes in governing coalitions or eventual changes due to byelections.

=== List of ridings ===
The original ridings were thirteen in number, and Cowichan was restored to a two-member seat while New Westminster was increased to three, with the new total being 33 members. There were no political parties were not acceptable in the House by convention, though some members were openly partisan at the federal level (usually Conservative, although both Liberal and Labour allegiance were on display by some candidates).

These ridings were:

- Alberni
- Cariboo (three members)
- Cassiar
- Comox
- Cowichan (two members)
- East Kootenay
- Esquimalt (two members)
- The Islands (formerly part of Nanaimo
- Lillooet (two members)
- Nanaimo
- Nanaimo City
- New Westminster City
- Vancouver City (two members)
- Victoria (two members)
- Victoria City (four members)
- East Kootenay
- Westminster (three members, formerly New Westminster
- Yale (three members)

=== Polling conditions ===
Natives (First Nations) and Chinese were disallowed from voting, although naturalized Kanakas (Hawaiian colonists) and American and West Indian blacks and certain others participated. The requirement that knowledge of English be spoken for balloting was discussed but not applied.

== Results by riding ==
Results of British Columbia general election, 1890
Government		Opposition	
Member	Riding & party	Riding & party	Member
Thomas Fletcher	Alberni; Government	Cariboo; Independent	George Cowan
Joseph Mason	Cariboo; Government	Cariboo; Independent	George Cowan
John Robson ^{1}	Cariboo; Government	Esquimalt; Opposition	David Williams Higgins
Samuel Augustus Rogers	Cariboo; Government	Esquimalt; Opposition	Charles Edward Pooley
Robert Hanley Hall	Cassiar; Government	Lillooet; Opposition	David Alexander Stoddart
Joseph Hunter	Comox; Government	New Westminster; Opposition	William Henry Ladner
Henry Croft	Cowichan; Government	New Westminster; Opposition	James Orr
Theodore Davie	Cowichan; Government	New Westminster City; Independent	John Cunningham Brown
James Baker	East Kootenay; Government	Vancouver City; Opposition; Independent	Francis Lovett Carter-Cotton
Alfred Wellington Smith	Lillooet; Government	Vancouver City; Opposition; Independent	James Welton Horne
George William Anderson	Victoria; Gov	Victoria City; Opposition	Robert Beaven
David McEwen Eberts	Victoria; Gov	Victoria City; Opposition	John Grant
John Herbert Turner	Victoria City; Gov	Victoria City; Opposition	George Lawson Milne
John Robson	Westminster; Gov	Yale; Opposition	Charles Augustus Semlin
George Bohun Martin	Yale; Government	Nanaimo; Labour; Farmer	Thomas William Forster
Forbes George Vernon	Yale; Government	Nanaimo; Labour; Farmer	Colin Campbell McKenzie
		Nanaimo City; Labour	Thomas Keith
		West Kootenay; Independent	James M. Kellie
		Westminster; Opposition; Independent	James Punch
		Westminster; Opposition; Independent	Thomas Edwin Kitchen
^{1} Premier-Elect and Incumbent Premier			
Source: Elections BC

== See also ==
- List of British Columbia political parties

== Further reading & references ==
- In the Sea of Sterile Mountains: The Chinese in British Columbia, Joseph Morton, J.J. Douglas, Vancouver (1974). Despite its title, a fairly thorough account of the politicians and electoral politics in early BC.
