= West Kootenay North =

Defunct provincial electoral district in British Columbia, Canada

West Kootenay-North was a provincial electoral district of British Columbia, Canada, in the 1894 election only. It was formed from a partition the West Kootenay riding that also created West Kootenay (south riding).

== Election results ==
Note: Winners of each election are in bold.

7th British Columbia election, 1894
Party	Candidate	Votes	%	±	Expenditures
Opposition	William M. Brown	125	36.55%	–	unknown
Government	**James M. Kellie**	**217**	**63.45%**	–	unknown
Total valid votes		342	100.00%		
Total rejected ballots					
Turnout		55.37%			

In the 1898 election the West Kootenay region was further redistributed into:

- West Kootenay-Nelson, used 1898–1900 only
  - Nelson City, 1903–1912
    - Nelson
- West Kootenay-Revelstoke, used 1900 only
  - Revelstoke, 1903–1963
- West Kootenay-Rossland, used 1898–1900 only
  - Rossland City 1903–1912
    - Rossland 1916–1920
- West Kootenay-Slocan, used 1898–1900 only
  - Kaslo, 1903–1920
  - Slocan, 1903–1920
    - Kaslo-Slocan, 1924–1963

== See also ==
- List of British Columbia provincial electoral districts
- Canadian provincial electoral districts
- List of electoral districts in the Kootenays
