= West Kootenay South =

Defunct provincial electoral district in British Columbia, Canada

West Kootenay South was a provincial electoral district of British Columbia, Canada, in the 1894 election only. Its official name was "West Kootenay (south riding)". It was formed from the division of the older Kootenay riding, one of the province's first twelve constituencies, which for the 1890 election was redistributed into:

- West Kootenay
- East Kootenay

The West Kootenay riding was further redistributed for the 1898 election into the ridings of:

- West Kootenay-Nelson, a provincial district from 1900 to 1903
- West Kootenay-Revelstoke, a provincial district from 1900 to 1903
- West Kootenay-Rossland, a provincial district from 1900 to 1903
- West Kootenay-Slocan, a provincial district from 1900 to 1903

== Election results ==
Note: Winners of each election are in bold.

7th British Columbia election, 1894
Party	Candidate	Votes	%	±	Expenditures
Government	George Buchanan	258	39.15%	–	unknown
Opposition	**John Frederick Hume**	**401**	**60.85%**	–	unknown
Total valid votes		659	100.00%		
Total rejected ballots					
Turnout		55.37%			

== See also ==
- List of British Columbia provincial electoral districts
- Canadian provincial electoral districts
- List of electoral districts in the Kootenays
