= John Fraser (British Columbia politician) =

Canadian politician

John A. Fraser
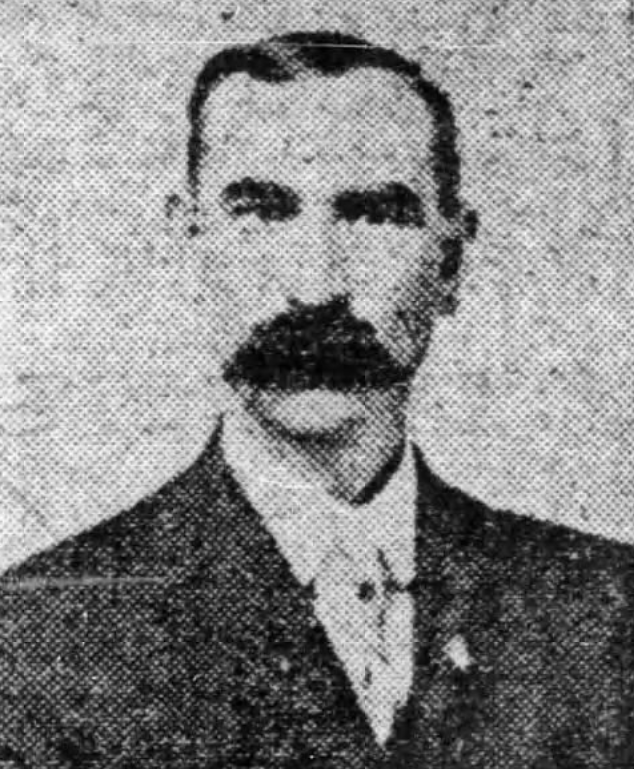

Member of the Legislative Assembly of British Columbia for Cariboo
- In office 1909–1916
- Preceded by: Harry Jones; John McKay Yorston
- Succeeded by: John McKay Yorston

Member of Parliament for Cariboo
- In office October 1925 – October 1935
- Preceded by: Thomas George McBride
- Succeeded by: James Gray Turgeon

Personal details
- Born: John Anderson Fraser; 4 April 1866 Shakespeare, Canada West
- Died: 8 May 1960 (aged 94)
- Party: Conservative
- Spouse(s): 1) Ursule C. C. Smith m. 19 December 1894; 2) Lillian Vaughan m. 8 September 1915
- Profession: Merchant, teacher

John Anderson Fraser (4 April 1866 – 8 May 1960) was a Conservative member of the House of Commons of Canada. He was born in Shakespeare, Canada West and became a merchant and teacher.

He attended the secondary school Stratford Collegiate Institute and became a director of John A. Fraser and Company. He taught schools in Ontario and British Columbia.

Fraser entered provincial politics at the Cariboo riding for the Conservatives in the 1909 British Columbia election, joining fellow Conservative Michael Callanan in the two-member riding. He was re-elected there in 1912. After Cariboo was changed to a single-member riding, Fraser was the sole Conservative candidate in the 1916 provincial election but was defeated by John McKay Yorston of the Liberals. He was also defeated in the 1920 and 1924 provincial elections.

He was elected to Parliament at the federal Cariboo riding in the 1925 general election then re-elected in 1926 and 1930. Fraser was defeated by James Gray Turgeon of the Liberals in the 1935 federal election.
