= West Kootenay (provincial electoral district) =

Defunct provincial electoral district in British Columbia, Canada

Coordinates: 49.8°N 118.7°W

West Kootenay was a provincial electoral district of British Columbia Canada. It was formed along with East Kootenay from a redistribution of the old Kootenay riding, which was one of the province's original twelve.

== Demographics ==
Population, 2001	38,503
Population Change, 1996–2001	0.7%
Area (km^{2})	10,275
Pop. Density (people per km^{2})	3.7

== History ==
The West Kootenay riding appeared as such only in the 1890 election. In 1894, due to a surge in population related to the "silver rush" in the Kootenays, the riding was redistributed into:

- West Kootenay (north riding)
- West Kootenay (south riding)

In 1898, the West Kootenay north and south ridings were further redistributed into four ridings:

- West Kootenay-Nelson, a provincial district from 1898 to 1903
- West Kootenay-Revelstoke, a provincial district from 1898 to 1903
- West Kootenay-Rossland, a provincial district from 1898 to 1903
- West Kootenay-Slocan, a provincial district from 1898 to 1903

== Election results ==
NOTE: Winners of each election are in bold

6th British Columbia election, 1890
Party	Candidate	Votes	%	±	Expenditures
Opposition	William M. Brown	45	28.85%	–	unknown
Government	Arthur Stanhope Farwell	40	25.64%	–	unknown
Opposition	John Wesley Haskins	25	16.03%	–	unknown
**Independent**	**James M. Kellie**	**46**	**29.49%**		unknown
Total valid votes		156	100.00%		
Total rejected ballots					
Turnout		%			

== See also ==
- List of British Columbia provincial electoral districts
- Canadian provincial electoral districts
- List of electoral districts in the Kootenays
