= Colin Buchanan Sword =

Canadian politician

Member of the Legislative Assembly for Westminster-Dewdney Westminster (1890–1894)
- In office November 7, 1890 – July 9, 1898

Personal details
- Born: February 1842 Scotland
- Died: May 6, 1928 (aged 86) New Westminster, British Columbia, Canada
- Party: Non-partisan democracy

Colin Buchanan Sword (February 1842 – May 6, 1928) was a Canadian politician. After being defeated in the June 1890 provincial election, he served in the Legislative Assembly of British Columbia from a November 1890 byelection until the 1898 provincial election from the electoral district of Westminster (1890 to 1894) and then Westminster-Dewdney (1894 to 1898). Although not a candidate in the July 1898 provincial election, he did run unsuccessfully later that year in a December byelection in the electoral district of Cowichan. Following that defeat, he never sought provincial office again.

== Electoral history ==
1890 British Columbia general election: Westminster
Party	Candidate	Votes	%	Elected
Government	John Robson	506	17.66	✓
Opposition	Thomas Edwin Kitchen	503	17.55	✓
Independent	James Punch	484	16.89	✓
Independent	Colin Buchanan Sword	461	16.08	
Government	John A. Kirkland	420	14.65	
Government	John Calvin Henderson	349	12.18	
Independent	Arthur Herring	81	2.83	
Opposition	Marshall Sinclair	62	2.16	
Total valid votes		2,866	100.00	
Source: Elections BC
Note: Robson also won the seat of Cariboo in the 1890 general election, and resigned his Westminster seat prior to the first session of the new legislature. Sword won the subsequent by-election on November 7, 1890.

British Columbia provincial by-election, November 7, 1890: Westminster Resignation of John Robson
Party	Candidate	Votes	%	Elected
Independent	Colin Buchanan Sword	472	49.68	✓
Independent	William Henry Ladner	286	30.11	
Independent	Livingston Thompson	134	14.11	
Independent	Samuel Greer	58	6.11	
Total valid votes		950	100.00	
Source: Elections BC

1894 British Columbia general election: Westminster-Dewdney
Party	Candidate	Votes	%	Elected
Opposition	Colin Buchanan Sword	327	59.35	✓
Government	John Matthew Lefevre	224	40.65	
Total valid votes		551	100.00	
Source: Elections BC

British Columbia provincial by-election, December 28, 1898: Cowichan
Party	Candidate	Votes	%	Elected
Opposition	William Russell Robertson	187	58.99	✓
Government	Colin Buchanan Sword	130	41.01	
Total valid votes		317	–	
Source: Elections BC
