= William Pinchbeck =

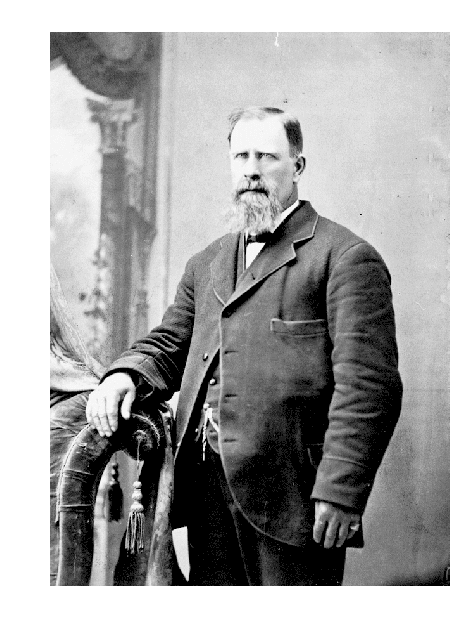
- William Pinchbeck (1880)
- Born: 1831; Toynton St Peter, Lincolnshire, England
- Died: July 1893 (aged 61–62); British Columbia
- Occupations: Provincial Police Constable, entrepreneur
- Spouses: Chulminick (m. 1863–1881) Alice Kilham (m. 1884–1893)
- Children: 5

William Pinchbeck (1831 – July 1893) was one of the original settlers in the Cariboo region of British Columbia, Canada. He was a member of the British Columbia Provincial Police and owned a roadhouse and many other properties in Williams Lake, British Columbia.

== Early years ==
Pinchbeck was born in Toynton St Peter, Lincolnshire, England in 1831. He was the fifth of the 13 children born to Robert Pinchbeck and Jane Anne Anderson. At the age of 18, he moved to San Francisco, United States where he operated a roadhouse during the California Gold Rush. He later traveled north to Victoria, British Columbia, Canada, where he joined the British Columbia Provincial Police.

== Williams Lake ==
In 1860, during the Cariboo Gold Rush, Pinchbeck accompanied Gold Commissioner Philip Henry Nind to Williams Lake to create a local government and bring law and order to the area. Nind had originally considered Fort Alexandria for this purpose but chose Williams Lake instead as it was at a junction of two main pack trails: one from the Douglas Road and another through the Fraser Canyon.

Like many provincial policemen of the era, Pinchbeck had to fulfill a variety of duties including Justice of the Peace, lawyer, judge, and jailer.

Throughout 1861-1863, Pincheck, in partnership with Thomas Meldrum and William Lyne, formed Pinchbeck and Company and built a roadhouse, a general store, a sawmill a flour mill, a distillery and a horse racing track. The horse races often drew large crowds of spectators and on some of the biggest races the stakes could be as high as $100,000.

Although the Cariboo Road bypassed Williams Lake in 1863, Pinchbeck stayed on in the area and continued to prosper and his roadhouse suffered no lack of business, particularly in the winter when it catered to local miners who stayed there until they could return to the goldfields in the spring.

Pinchbeck's company eventually owned most of the Williams Lake Valley and his roadhouse prospered and became famous for its "White Wheat Whiskey" which came from Pinchbeck's own distillery and sold for 25 cents a shot.

== Domestic life ==
In 1863, Pinchbeck began a common-law marriage with Chulminick, a local First Nations Shuswap woman, who was the daughter of Chief William, for whom Williams Lake is named. Their home was located where the Williams Lake Stampede Grounds are today. They had two sons, William Felix, born in 1867 and James, born in 1872.

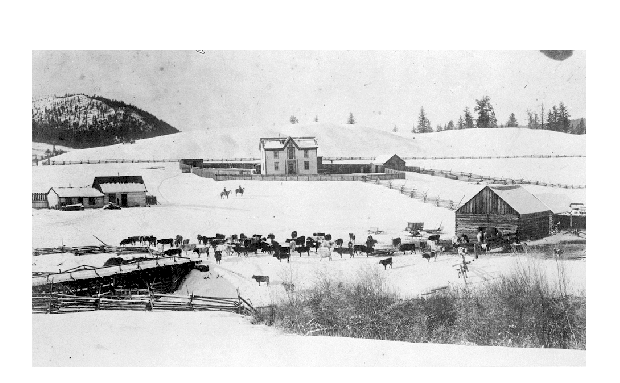
William Pinchbeck's "Lake House" and ranch (1890)

In 1884, after returning to England, Pinchbeck married Alice Elizabeth Kilham and returned to Williams Lake where he built his new bride a ranch house on the lake, which they called the "Lake House" and was one of the finest homes in the Cariboo.

The couple had three sons: Robert in 1885, Fredrick in 1887, and Cyril in 1889.

By the late 1880s both William Lyne and Thomas Meldrum had left the partnership and Pinchbeck had sole ownership of the entire valley. However, the Cariboo region's economy was by then beginning to decline. The initial excitement over the gold rush was long past and with no major roads running near Williams Lake, Pinchbeck's ranch and businesses were no longer profitable.

Pinchbeck died on July 30 or 31st, 1893, and was buried in a plot overlooking Williams Lake.

== Electoral record ==
1890 British Columbia general election: Cariboo
Party	Candidate	Votes	%	Elected
Government	Joseph Mason	187	29.13	✓
Government	John Robson	158	24.61	✓
Government	Samuel Augustus Rogers	163	25.39	✓
Government	William Pinchbeck	134	20.87	
Total valid votes		642	100.00	
Source: Elections BC
