= Westminster (electoral district) =

Defunct provincial electoral district in British Columbia, Canada

British Columbia electoral district

Defunct provincial electoral district
- Legislature: Legislative Assembly of British Columbia
- District created: 1890
- District abolished: 1894
- First contested: 1890
- Last contested: 1890

Westminster was a provincial electoral district of British Columbia, Canada. It appeared in the 1890 election only. In 1894 it was succeeded by Westminster-Chilliwhack, Westminster-Delta, Westminster-Dewdney, and Westminster-Richmond, which were in the 1898 election succeeded by ridings named similarly, but without the "Westminster".

Note that this provincial riding should not be confused with the federal Westminster District riding which appeared only in the 1917 election, and which was succeeded by the Fraser Valley riding.

== Geography and history ==
In the early 1880s, the Lower Fraser Valley south and east of the city of New Westminster was largely unpopulated, with voters there voting in one of the two New Westminster ridings (New Westminster or New Westminster City). With the opening of the Canadian Pacific Railway settlement of the lush Fraser Valley lands was rapid, and a new more rural riding — Westminster — was created spanning the entire lower Fraser from Richmond to Chilliwack. Increasing growth led to the riding's further subdivision for the 1894 election into four sub-ridings, Westminster-Chilliwhack, Westminster-Delta, Westminster-Dewdney, and Westminster-Richmond. The successor ridings dropped the Westminster-prefix for the 1903 election.

The name Westminster in the riding's name derives not so much from these areas being dependent on the city of New Westminster, but because it and all its successor ridings are all in the New Westminster Land District (beyond Chilliwack is the Yale Land District).

== Electoral history ==
1890 British Columbia general election
Party	Candidate	Votes	%	Elected
Government	John Robson	506	17.66	✓
Opposition	Thomas Edwin Kitchen	503	17.55	✓
Independent	James Punch	484	16.89	✓
Independent	Colin Buchanan Sword	461	16.08	
Government	John A. Kirkland	420	14.65	
Government	John Calvin Henderson	349	12.18	
Independent	Arthur Herring	81	2.83	
Opposition	Marshall Sinclair	62	2.16	
Total valid votes		2,866	100.00	
Source: Elections BC
Note: Robson also won the seat of Cariboo in the 1890 general election, and resigned his Westminster seat prior to the first session of the new legislature.

British Columbia provincial by-election, November 7, 1890 Resignation of John Robson
Party	Candidate	Votes	%	Elected
Independent	Colin Buchanan Sword	472	49.68	✓
Independent	William Henry Ladner	286	30.11	
Independent	Livingston Thompson	134	14.11	
Independent	Samuel Greer	58	6.11	
Total valid votes		950	100.00	
Source: Elections BC

== See also ==
- List of British Columbia provincial electoral districts
- Canadian provincial electoral districts
- [(New Westminster (electoral districts)]]
