= John Charlton Kinchant =

Canadian politician

MLA for Cariboo
- In office 1898–1900

Personal details
- Born: 1846 England
- Died: November 26, 1923 (aged 79) Horley, Surrey, England
- Party: Opposition

John Charlton Kinchant (1846 – November 26, 1923) was a Canadian politician. After being an unsuccessful candidate in the 1894 provincial election, he served in the Legislative Assembly of British Columbia from 1898 to 1900 from the electoral district of Cariboo. Following his defeat in the 1900 provincial election, he did not attempt to seek a second term in the Legislature in a future election.

== Election results ==
7th British Columbia election, 1894
Party	Candidate	Votes	%	±	Expenditures
Government	William Adams	147	21.33%	–	unknown
Opposition	John Charlton Kinchant	95	13.79%	–	unknown
Opposition	Robert McLeese	142	20.61%	–	unknown
Government	Samuel Augustus Rogers	167	24.24%	–	unknown
Government	Hugh Watt	138	20.03%	–	unknown
Total valid votes		689	100.00%		
Total rejected ballots					
Turnout		%			

8th British Columbia election, 1898
Party	Candidate	Votes	%	±	Expenditures
Opposition	Hans Lars Helgesen	218	28.76%	–	unknown
Government	Joseph Hunter	173	22.82%	–	unknown
Opposition	John Charlton Kinchant	195	25.73%	–	unknown
Government	Samuel Augustus Rogers	172	22.69%	–	unknown
Total valid votes		758	100.00%		
Total rejected ballots					
Turnout		%			

1900 British Columbia general election: Cariboo
Party	Candidate	Votes	%	Elected
Conservative	Joseph Hunter	302	31.17	✓
Conservative	Samuel Augustus Rogers	289	29.82	✓
Progressive	Harry Jones	201	20.74	
Progressive	John Charlton Kinchant	177	18.27	
Total valid votes		969		
