= John Robson (politician) =

Premier of British Columbia from 1889 to 1892

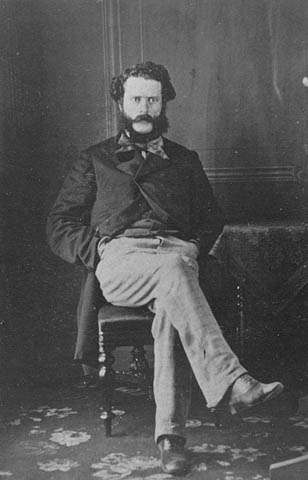
- Hon. John Robson

9th Premier of British Columbia
- In office 2 August 1889 – 29 June 1892
- Monarch: Victoria
- Lieutenant Governor: Hugh Nelson
- Preceded by: Alexander Edmund Batson Davie
- Succeeded by: Theodore Davie

Member of the Legislative Assembly of British Columbia
- In office 13 June 1890 – 29 June 1892 Serving with Joseph Mason, Samuel Augustus Rogers, Ithiel Nason
- Preceded by: Robert McLeese
- Succeeded by: Hugh Watt
- Constituency: Cariboo
- In office 13 June 1890 – 20 November 1890 Serving with Thomas Edwin Kitchen, James Punch
- Preceded by: first member
- Succeeded by: Colin Buchanan Sword
- Constituency: Westminster
- In office 24 July 1882 – 13 June 1890 Serving with James Orr, William Henry Ladner
- Preceded by: Wellington John Harris; Donald McGillivray
- Succeeded by: district abolished
- Constituency: New Westminster
- In office 15 October 1871 – 11 September 1875
- Preceded by: first member
- Succeeded by: John Bryden
- Constituency: Nanaimo

7th President of New Westminster City Council
- In office 1866–1867
- Preceded by: William J. Armstrong
- Succeeded by: Henry Holbrook

Personal details
- Born: 14 March 1824 Perth, Ontario, Upper Canada
- Died: 29 June 1892 (aged 68) London, England
- Party: None
- Cabinet: Robson ministry

John Robson (14 March 1824 – 29 June 1892) was a Canadian journalist and politician, who served as the ninth premier of British Columbia.

== Journalist and activist ==
Robson spent his early life as a merchant in Canada West and Montreal in Canada East. In 1859, upon news of the Fraser Canyon Gold Rush, Robson moved west to the then Colony of British Columbia from Upper Canada. Unsuccessful at prospecting, Robson helped his brother, a Methodist minister, complete construction of a church in New Westminster, the capital of the new colony. He settled there and evidently became known in reformist circles as an articulate advocate of responsible government, for he was shortly hired as editor of a new newspaper, The British Columbian.

As editor, Robson advocated that Lieutenant-Governor Richard Clement Moody's office include that of Governor of British Columbia, to make obsolete the corrupt and megalomaniac holder of the latter, Sir James Douglas.

Robson joined with contemporaneous editors such as Amor De Cosmos to oppose the corrupt Governor Douglas and the same's officials, including Chief Justice Sir Matthew Baillie Begbie, who in 1862 brought contempt-of-court charges against Robson, during the Cottonwood Scandal, for publishing an allegation that Begbie had accepted a bribe from speculators. Robson served also on the New Westminster town-council in the 1860s before being appointed to the British Columbia Legislative Council.

By 1864, Douglas had retired and the colony finally had its own resident governor, Frederick Seymour. Robson became a reluctant supporter of the colony's union with Vancouver Island in 1866, but by 1869, Robson had moved his newspaper's operations across the Strait to Victoria. His newspaper was then bought by its rival the Daily British Colonist (today the Victoria Times-Colonist), which had been founded by De Cosmos. There Robson served as political editor for six years, and became a passionate advocate for the colony's union with Canada, formed as a confederation of four colonies of British North America on 1 July 1867. Together with De Cosmos and Robert Beaven (also future premiers), Robson founded the Confederation League which lobbied Seymour, as well as London and Ottawa, for British Columbia's entry into Confederation, which was attained when British Columbia was admitted as the sixth province of Canada on 20 July 1871.

== Provincial political career ==
During British Columbia's colonial days, Robson had briefly served in the colonial assembly, but otherwise his political activity was limited to editorializing and lobbying. Once the colony joined confederation in 1871, however, he ran and was elected to the new province's first legislative assembly as a representative for Nanaimo. There he became an opponent of his former ally De Cosmos as well as Premier George Anthony Walkem, and advocated reforms, including female suffrage. His support for Alexander Mackenzie's Liberals in the 1874 federal election, won him a patronage appointment with the Canadian Pacific Railway, a position he held for five years. Following this, Robson purchased a newspaper in New Westminster, which he published and edited for two years.

In 1882, after a seven-year absence, Robson returned to the provincial legislature as one of the members for New Westminster. He served in various high-profile cabinet portfolios under Premiers William Smithe and A.E.B. Davie, where he earned a reputation as an advocate for public education, accelerated settlement, improved exploration and surveys, and subsidies to transportation providers, such as railways. He was also a vigorous opponent of land speculation, seeing it as a hindrance to settlement and transforming land into economically viable resources. Perhaps his greatest success came as the leading advocate for constructing the Canadian Pacific Railway terminus at Granville, and his encouragement of the citizens there to incorporate their locality. It was Robson who was responsible for having the legislature name the new municipality Vancouver upon its incorporation in 1886. During Davie's illness, Robson served as acting premier.

Upon Davie's death 1889, Robson was appointed premier. In 1890, to ease his workload, he moved from representing the busy, growing riding of New Westminster to becoming one of the members for the vast, frontier electoral district of Cariboo in the province's Central Interior. His brief tenure is chiefly remembered for his continued actions to enable Dominion Lands Act homesteading, as well as his lobbying of the federal government to construct a dry dock at Esquimalt, just west of Victoria. Robson remained premier until his death in 1892, which occurred after he hurt his finger in the door of a carriage during a visit to London, and got blood poisoning.

John Robson is interred in the Ross Bay Cemetery in Victoria, British Columbia.

== Places named for Robson ==
- Robson Cove is located near the entrance to Burrard Inlet.
- Robson Street, a major east-west thoroughfare in downtown Vancouver, British Columbia.
- Robson Square, along the street of the same name.
- Robson town near Castlegar.
- John Robson Building on Robson Street.
- John Robson Elementary School in New Westminster.

Not named for Robson

- Robson Bight, on Vancouver Island, off Johnstone Strait is not named for him, but for Royal Navy officer Charles Rufus Robson.
- Mount Robson, on the border between British Columbia and Alberta, is not named for him, but likely for North West Company guide Colin Robertson.

== Electoral record ==
1871 British Columbia general election: Nanaimo
Party	Candidate	Votes	%	Elected
Independent	John Robson	57	63.33	✓
Independent	Joseph Westrop Carey	33	36.67	
Total valid votes		90	100.00	
Source: Elections BC

1882 British Columbia general election: New Westminster
Party	Candidate	Votes	%	Elected
Opposition	John Robson	262	37.01	✓
Opposition	James Orr	168	23.73	✓
Opposition	Herbert John Kirkland	127	17.94	
Government	William Henry Ladner	76	10.73	
Opposition	Henry Dawson	60	8.47	
Government	William Isaac	15	2.12	
Total valid votes		708	100.00	
Source: Elections BC

British Columbia provincial by-election, February 1883: New Westminster Resignation of John Robson upon appointment to Executive Council
Party	Candidate	Votes	Elected
Government	John Robson	acclaimed	✓
Source: Elections BC

1886 British Columbia general election: New Westminster
Party	Candidate	Votes	%	Elected
Government	John Robson	420	18.67	✓
Opposition	James Orr	358	15.92	✓
Opposition	William Henry Ladner	365	16.23	✓
Government	Herbert John Kirkland	348	15.47	
Opposition	Donald McGillivray	331	14.72	
Independent	Lewis Arthur Agassiz	142	6.31	
Independent	William Isaac	17	0.76	
Independent	Henry Dawson	11	0.49	
Independent	James Kennedy	7	0.31	
Government	Allen Casey Wells	250	11.12	
Total valid votes		2,249	100.00	
Source: Elections BC

1890 British Columbia general election: Cariboo
Party	Candidate	Votes	%	Elected
Government	Joseph Mason	187	29.13	✓
Government	John Robson	158	24.61	✓
Government	Samuel Augustus Rogers	163	25.39	✓
Government	William Pinchbeck	134	20.87	
Total valid votes		642	100.00	
Source: Elections BC

1890 British Columbia general election: Westminster
Party	Candidate	Votes	%	Elected
Government	John Robson	506	17.66	✓
Opposition	Thomas Edwin Kitchen	503	17.55	✓
Independent	James Punch	484	16.89	✓
Independent	Colin Buchanan Sword	461	16.08	
Government	John A. Kirkland	420	14.65	
Government	John Calvin Henderson	349	12.18	
Independent	Arthur Herring	81	2.83	
Opposition	Marshall Sinclair	62	2.16	
Total valid votes		2,866	100.00	
Source: Elections BC
Note: Robson also won the seat of Cariboo in the 1890 general election, and resigned his Westminster seat prior to the first session of the new legislature. Sword won the subsequent by-election on November 7, 1890.
