= List of electoral districts in the Kootenays =

Kootenay is a name found in various provincial and federal electoral districts in the Canadian province of British Columbia. This page lists ridings with the name Kootenay in them, and also other ridings within the Kootenay region.

== Current federal electoral districts ==
- Kootenay—Columbia (East Kootenay-Revelstoke region)
- British Columbia Southern Interior (mostly Okanagan, includes Trail-Castlegar-Nelson corridor)

== Defunct federal electoral districts ==
Note: indentations indicate rough historical succession of historical ridings

- Kootenay (1903–1914)
  - Kootenay East (1914–1966)
    - Okanagan—Kootenay (1966–1976)
      - Kootenay East (1976–1977)
        - Kootenay East—Revelstoke (1977–1987)
          - Kootenay East (1987–1996)
            - Kootenay—Columbia (1996– )
  - Kootenay West (1914–1987)
    - Kootenay West—Revelstoke (1987–1996)
      - West Kootenay—Okanagan/Kootenay—Boundary—Okanagan (1996–1998, 1998–2003)
        - British Columbia Southern Interior (2003–)

== Current provincial electoral districts ==
- Columbia River-Revelstoke
- Kootenay East
- Kootenay West
- Nelson-Creston

== Defunct provincial electoral districts ==
Note: indentations indicate rough historical succession of historical ridings.

- Kootenay (1871–1886)
  - East Kootenay (1890–1894)
    - East Kootenay (north riding) (1894–1900)
      - Columbia (1903–1928)
        - Columbia-Revelstoke (1933 only)
          - Columbia (1937–1963)
            - Columbia River (1966–1986)
              - Columbia River-Revelstoke (current riding since 1991)
    - East Kootenay (south riding) (1894–1903)
      - Fernie (1903–1963)
      - Cranbrook (1903–1963)
        - Kootenay/East Kootenay/Kootenay East (current riding since 1966)
  - West Kootenay (1890–1894)
    - West Kootenay (north riding) (1894–1898)
      - West Kootenay-Slocan (1900 only)
        - Slocan (1903–1920)
        - Kaslo (1903–1920)
          - Kaslo-Slocan (1924–1963)
      - West Kootenay-Revelstoke (1900 only)
        - Revelstoke (1903–1928)
          - Columbia-Revelstoke (1933 only)
            - Revelstoke (1937–1963)
              - Revelstoke-Slocan (1966–1975)
                - Shuswap-Revelstoke (1979–1986)
                - Columbia River-Revelstoke (current riding since 1991)
    - West Kootenay (south riding) (1894–1898)
      - West Kootenay-Nelson (1900 only)
        - Ymir (1903–1912)
        - Nelson City (1903–1912)
          - Nelson (1916–1928)
          - Creston (1924–1928)
            - Nelson-Creston (current riding since 1933)
      - West Kootenay-Rossland (1900 only)
        - Rossland City (1903–1912)
          - Rossland (1916–1920)
          - Trail (1916–1920)
            - Rossland-Trail (1924–1996)
              - West Kootenay-Boundary (2001–2009)
                - Kootenay West (2009-)
        - Greenwood (1903–1920)
        - Grand Forks (1903–1920)
          - Grand Forks-Greenwood (1924–1963)
            - Boundary-Similkameen (1966–1988)
              - Okanagan-Boundary (1991–1996)
                - West Kootenay-Boundary (2001–2009)
                  - Boundary-Similkameen (2009-)

== See also ==
- List of electoral districts in the Okanagan
- Vancouver (electoral districts)
- List of electoral districts in Greater Victoria
- List of electoral districts in Greater Nanaimo
- List of British Columbia provincial electoral districts
- Canadian provincial electoral districts
