= Walter Hogg =

Member of the Legislative Assembly of British Columbia
- In office 1948–1949
- Preceded by: Louis LeBourdais
- Succeeded by: Angus MacLean
- Constituency: Cariboo

Personal details
- Born: February 17, 1889 Dumfries, Scotland
- Died: September 19, 1949 (aged 60) Kamloops, British Columbia
- Party: Coalition
- Spouse: Mary Wilson Beveridge
- Occupation: farmer

Walter Hogg (February 17, 1889 – September 19, 1949) was a Canadian politician. He served in the Legislative Assembly of British Columbia from a February 1948 byelection until the Legislature was dissolved in April 1949 for that year's provincial election, from the electoral district of Cariboo, a member of the Coalition government. He did not seek a second term in the Legislature in the 1949 election and died several months later.
