= Westminster-Delta =

Defunct provincial electoral district in British Columbia, Canada

Westminster-Delta was a provincial electoral district of British Columbia, Canada, from 1894 to 1900. It and its sister ridings (Westminster-Chilliwhack, Westminster-Dewdney, and Westminster-Richmond) were successors to the four-member Westminster riding, which appeared in 1890 only and was a subdivision of the older New Westminster (provincial electoral district) riding. Westminster-Delta was succeeded by the Delta riding in the election of 1903.

== Electoral history ==
1894 British Columbia general election
Party	Candidate	Votes	%	Elected
Opposition	Thomas William Forster	545	63.23	✓
Government	James Punch	317	36.77	
Total valid votes		862	100.00	
Source: Elections BC

1898 British Columbia general election
Party	Candidate	Votes	%	Elected
Opposition	Thomas William Forster	331	59.96%	✓
Government	Henry Dean Benson	221	40.04%	
Total valid votes		552		

1900 British Columbia general election
Party	Candidate	Votes	%
Government	John Oliver	324	45.51
Conservative	John Walter Berry	215	30.20
Progressive	Thomas William Forster	173	24.30
Total valid votes		712	100.00

== See also ==
- List of British Columbia provincial electoral districts
- Canadian provincial electoral districts
