= William Henry Ladner =

Canadian politician

Member of the Legislative Assembly of British Columbia for New Westminster
- In office July 7, 1886 – June 13, 1990 Serving with James Orr and John Robson
- Preceded by: James Orr and John Robson
- Succeeded by: Thomas Edwin Kitchen, James Punch, and John Robson

Personal details
- Born: 28 November 1826 Cornwall, England
- Died: 1 November 1907 (aged 80) Ladner, British Columbia, Canada
- Party: Conservative
- Other political affiliations: Non-partisan (until 1903)

William Henry Ladner (November 28, 1826 – November 1, 1907) was an English miner, farmer and political figure in British Columbia. He represented New Westminster from 1886 to 1890 in the Legislative Assembly of British Columbia.

== Life ==
Ladner was born in Cornwall, the son of Edward Ladner and Sarah Ellis. In 1848, he emigrated to Mineral Point, Wisconsin where his father had arrived earlier with other Cornish miners. After his father died in 1851, Ladner and his brother Thomas Ellis travelled to California to mine for gold. In 1858, they headed north and joined the rush to the newly discovered gold fields in the Fraser River canyon in British Columbia. Ladner was named a constable for the region. In 1865, with partner Robert Thompson Smith, he was involved in transporting goods to the Big Bend region on the Columbia River. After mining in the area was found to be unproductive, Ladner's business collapsed and he began farming in the delta of the Fraser River. In 1879, he lobbied for the creation of a new rural municipality, Delta. Ladner served as a reeve and local police constable.

Ladner ran unsuccessfully for a seat in New Westminster District in the 1882 provincial election before being elected in 1886. He did not seek a second term in the Legislature in the June 1890 provincial election but was defeated when he ran for re-election in a November 1890 byelection in the Westminster District. He later took part in the formation of the provincial Conservative party. He ran unsuccessfully as a Conservative for the assembly seat representing Delta in 1903.

Ladner was married twice: first to Mary Ann Booth in 1866 and then to Mrs. Ella B. McLellan in 1897. He died in Ladner, named after the two brothers, at the age of 80.

== Elections ==
1886 British Columbia general election: New Westminster
Party	Candidate	Votes	%	Elected
Government	John Robson	420	18.67	✓
Opposition	James Orr	358	15.92	✓
Opposition	William Henry Ladner	365	16.23	✓
Government	Herbert John Kirkland	348	15.47	
Opposition	Donald McGillivray	331	14.72	
Independent	Lewis Arthur Agassiz	142	6.31	
Independent	William Isaac	17	0.76	
Independent	Henry Dawson	11	0.49	
Independent	James Kennedy	7	0.31	
Government	Allen Casey Wells	250	11.12	
Total valid votes		2,249	100.00	
Source: Elections BC

British Columbia provincial by-election, November 7, 1890: Westminster Resignation of John Robson
Party	Candidate	Votes	%	Elected
Independent	Colin Buchanan Sword	472	49.68	✓
Independent	William Henry Ladner	286	30.11	
Independent	Livingston Thompson	134	14.11	
Independent	Samuel Greer	58	6.11	
Total valid votes		950	100.00	
Source: Elections BC

1903 British Columbia general election
Party	Candidate	Votes	%	Elected
Liberal	John Oliver	447	59.13	✓
Conservative	William Henry Ladner	309	40.87	
Total valid votes		756	100.00%	
