= Kersley, British Columbia =

Community in British Columbia, Canada

Coordinates: 52°49′07″N 122°25′06″W

Location of Kersley in British Columbia

Kersley is a small, unincorporated rural community located just south of Quesnel in British Columbia, Canada. Kersley is situated along highway 97 in a micro-climate area that also includes the nearby communities of Alexandria, Mcleese lake, and Soda Creek. Kersley is home to Sisters Creek park, a recreational walking/equestrian trail along the banks of the Fraser River. The community of Kersley has a cold weather ice arena, public park, tennis courts, baseball diamond, and volunteer fire department.

== Climate ==
Kersley has a humid continental climate (Köppen Dfb) with mild summers and cold winters. In spite of winters being cold, Kersley is mild for its latitude in North America due to some Pacific moderation. The climate is relatively dry, being in a rain shadow of the coastal mountains, but in spite of this snowfall is quite high.

Climate data for Kersley, BC (1971–2000 normals)
Month	Jan	Feb	Mar	Apr	May	Jun	Jul	Aug	Sep	Oct	Nov	Dec	Year
Record high °C (°F)	14.4 (57.9)	14.5 (58.1)	17.5 (63.5)	30.6 (87.1)	35.5 (95.9)	33.9 (93.0)	35.6 (96.1)	35 (95)	36 (97)	26.5 (79.7)	16 (61)	12.5 (54.5)	36 (97)
Mean daily maximum °C (°F)	−3.8 (25.2)	0.1 (32.2)	6.4 (43.5)	12.5 (54.5)	17.1 (62.8)	20.2 (68.4)	23.4 (74.1)	22.9 (73.2)	17.8 (64.0)	10.2 (50.4)	1.9 (35.4)	−3.3 (26.1)	10.5 (50.9)
Daily mean °C (°F)	−8.5 (16.7)	−5.0 (23.0)	0.3 (32.5)	5.6 (42.1)	10.0 (50.0)	13.2 (55.8)	15.8 (60.4)	15.3 (59.5)	10.9 (51.6)	4.9 (40.8)	−2.0 (28.4)	−7.6 (18.3)	4.4 (39.9)
Mean daily minimum °C (°F)	−13.1 (8.4)	−10.2 (13.6)	−5.9 (21.4)	−1.4 (29.5)	2.6 (36.7)	6.1 (43.0)	8.2 (46.8)	7.7 (45.9)	3.9 (39.0)	−0.6 (30.9)	−5.9 (21.4)	−12 (10)	−1.7 (28.9)
Record low °C (°F)	−43 (−45)	−37 (−35)	−31.7 (−25.1)	−15 (5)	−6.7 (19.9)	−2.8 (27.0)	−0.6 (30.9)	−2.2 (28.0)	−7.5 (18.5)	−29.5 (−21.1)	−37 (−35)	−43.5 (−46.3)	−43.5 (−46.3)
Average precipitation mm (inches)	43 (1.7)	25.7 (1.01)	23.5 (0.93)	20.6 (0.81)	43.4 (1.71)	63.7 (2.51)	58.6 (2.31)	55.3 (2.18)	41.1 (1.62)	42.5 (1.67)	43.6 (1.72)	50.1 (1.97)	510.7 (20.11)
Average snowfall cm (inches)	39.7 (15.6)	22.4 (8.8)	16.1 (6.3)	4.7 (1.9)	0.8 (0.3)	0.0 (0.0)	0.0 (0.0)	0.0 (0.0)	0.7 (0.3)	6.2 (2.4)	29.4 (11.6)	46.5 (18.3)	166.6 (65.6)
Source: Environment Canada

== See also ==
- Alexandria
- Australian
