= John Bryden =

John Bryden may refer to:

- John H. Bryden (born 1943), Canadian Member of Parliament
- John G. Bryden (1937–2016), Canadian Senator
- John Bryden (MLA) (1833–1915), British Columbia MLA
- John Bryden (curler) (1927–2012), Scottish curler
