= Alex Fraser (politician) =

Canadian politician

Alexander Vaughan Fraser

Member of the British Columbia Legislative Assembly for Cariboo
- In office August 27, 1969 – May 9, 1989 Serving with Neil Vant (1986–1989)
- Preceded by: Robert Bonner
- Succeeded by: David Zirnhelt

Personal details
- Born: June 22, 1916 Victoria, British Columbia, Canada
- Died: May 9, 1989 (aged 72) Quesnel, British Columbia, Canada
- Party: Social Credit Party of British Columbia
- Spouse: Gertrude Watt
- Occupation: businessman

Military service
- Allegiance: Canada
- Branch/service: Canadian Army
- Years of service: 1942–1946
- Unit: Royal Canadian Army Service Corps

Alexander Vaughan Fraser (June 22, 1916 – May 9, 1989) was a Canadian politician. Fraser began his career as a businessman in the central British Columbia town of Quesnel, located in the Cariboo region. During World War II, he enlisted and served in the Royal Canadian Army Service Corps in British Columbia and Ontario from 1942 until his discharge in March 1946.

Fraser came from a political family. His father, John, served in both the provincial legislature and federal parliament. Fraser himself began his own political career in 1949, when he was elected as commissioner of Quesnel. In 1950 Fraser was elected reeve (later mayor) of Quesnel, a position he held for the next twenty years. During that time he served both as president of the Union of B.C. Municipalities and chairman of the Cariboo Regional District.

Fraser moved from local to provincial politics in 1969, winning the Cariboo riding for the British Columbia Social Credit Party. In 1986, Fraser became ill and was diagnosed with throat cancer. He lost his voice after surgery in June, but ran in the election that same year. Eventually his throat cancer forced him to resign a few months before his death.

Fraser was a prominent member of the cabinets of Premiers Bill Bennett and Bill Vander Zalm, serving as the province's Minister of Transportation and Highways a cumulative total of eleven years between 1975 and 1986.

The Alex Fraser Bridge over the Fraser River (the river named for the explorer, Simon Fraser, and not the politician) is named in his honour. Part of Highway 91, the bridge links the municipalities of Richmond and Delta. The Alex Fraser Research Forest was created in 1987, and named in his honour. The Research Forest is operated by the University of British Columbia Faculty of Forestry, and is located east of Williams Lake. A park in Quesnel is also named for him.

| Preceded by Robert Bonner | MLA for Cariboo; 1969–1989 | Succeeded by David Zirnhelt |
