= Charles Wilson (British Columbia politician) =

Canadian politician (1841–1924)

Attorney General of British Columbia
- In office November 5, 1903 – March 15, 1906
- Preceded by: Albert Edward McPhillips
- Succeeded by: Frederick John Fulton

Leader of the Conservative Party of British Columbia
- In office 1899–1903
- Preceded by: Position established
- Succeeded by: Richard McBride

Member of the British Columbia Legislative Assembly
- In office July 24, 1882 – July 7, 1886
- Constituency: Cariboo
- In office October 3, 1903 – February 2, 1907
- Constituency: Vancouver City

Personal details
- Born: February 5, 1841 London, England
- Died: March 1, 1924 (aged 83)
- Party: BC Conservative (1899–1924)
- Other political affiliations: Independent (before 1899)

Charles Wilson (February 5, 1841 – March 1, 1924) was an English-born politician and lawyer who served as the leader of the Conservative Party of British Columbia from 1899 to 1903. He served as a member of the Legislative Assembly (MLA) representing the electoral districts of Cariboo from 1882 to 1886 and Vancouver City from 1903 to 1907. He served as an independent during his first in office before becoming Conservative leader. He later served as Attorney General of British Columbia from 1903 to 1906 during his second term in office.

== Early life and education ==
Wilson was born in London, England in 1841, and was educated in England. He came to Victoria, British Columbia, in 1862 at the age of 21. He subsequently worked in the gold fields of the Cariboo and Big Bend regions before studying law. He was called to the British Columbia bar in 1883 and later served as counsel for the Bank of Montreal.

== Political career ==
Wilson was elected to the Legislative Assembly of British Columbia for Cariboo in 1882 and served until 1886. He served as an independent during this period. He was defeated when he sought reelection in 1886. He subsequently ran unsuccessfully for Victoria City in 1890.

Wilson was elected leader of the Conservative Party of British Columbia in 1899. He was not elected to the Legislative Assembly in the 1900 provincial election, when he was an unsuccessful candidate in Vancouver City. He later returned to the legislature after being elected for Vancouver City in 1903, serving until 1907.

Wilson served in the provincial cabinet as President of the Council and later as Attorney General of British Columbia. He served as President of the Council from June to November 1903 and as Attorney General from Attorney General of British Columbia from 1903 to 1906, during the government of Premier Richard McBride.

Wilson was an unsuccessful candidate in the 1907 provincial election in the Cariboo riding.

== Later years and career ==
Wilson also served as Treasurer, the chief elected officer of the Law Society of British Columbia, from 1920 to 1924.

In his later years, Wilson was described as a prominent figure at sittings of the Court of Appeal in Vancouver and Victoria. Due to declining physical health, he was permitted to remain seated while pleading before the court. Despite his physical condition, his mental faculties remained vigorous, and he was described as one of the few surviving people who had witnessed the development of British Columbia from its early days.

== Personal life ==
Wilson was married three times. He married Minnie Parker in 1876, Helen Mary Twiford in 1894, and Maude Hamilton McLean in 1909.

Wilson died in Vancouver on March 1, 1924, at the age of 83.
