= Hugh Watt (Canadian politician) =

Canadian politician

Hugh Watt (ca 1841 – March 21, 1914) was a physician and political figure in British Columbia. He represented Cariboo in the Legislative Assembly of British Columbia from 1892 to 1894.

He was born in Fergus, Ontario and was the great grandson of James Watt. He became owner and editor of the Fergus News-Record. Watt studied medicine at the University of Toronto and then came to Barkerville, British Columbia by way of San Francisco in 1882. He was surgeon in charge of the Barkerville Hospital from 1882 to 1895. Watt was also a member of the local school board. He ran unsuccessfully for a federal seat in 1891. Watt was elected to the assembly in an 1892 by-election held following the death of John Robson but was defeated when he ran for reelection in 1894. He moved to Fort Steele in 1897. Watt served as Health Officer for the Fort Steele Mining District. He married Alice Nicholson, his second wife, in 1912. Watt later moved to Elko, where he died at the age of 73.
