= Angus MacLean (British Columbia politician) =

Member of the Legislative Assembly of British Columbia
- In office 1949–1952
- Preceded by: Walter Hogg
- Succeeded by: Ralph Chetwynd
- Constituency: Cariboo

Personal details
- Born: September 22, 1891 Bayhead, Inverness-shire, Scotland
- Died: December 15, 1972 (aged 81) Quesnel, British Columbia
- Party: Coalition
- Spouse: Christina Macdonald
- Children: 3
- Occupation: miner

Angus MacLean (September 22, 1891 – December 15, 1972) was a Canadian politician. He served in the Legislative Assembly of British Columbia from 1949 to 1952 from the electoral district of Cariboo, a member of the Coalition government. Running as a Liberal Party candidate, he was defeated in his attempt to win a second term in the Legislature in the 1952 provincial election.
