= Westminster-Chilliwhack =

Defunct provincial electoral district in British Columbia, Canada

Westminster-Chilliwack was a provincial electoral district of British Columbia, Canada, from 1894 to 1900. It and its sister ridings (Westminster-Delta, Westminster-Dewdney, and Westminster-Richmond) were successors to the old four-member Westminster riding, which appeared in 1890 only and was a subdivision of the older New Westminster provincial electoral riding. Westminster-Chilliwack was succeeded by the Chilliwhack riding in the election of 1903.

== Electoral history ==
1894 British Columbia general election
Party	Candidate	Votes	%	±%	Expenditures	Elected
Opposition	Thomas Edwin Kitchen	325	51.75%	–	Unknown	✓
Government	Charles William Munro	303	48.25%	–	Unknown	
Total valid votes		628	100.00%			
Total rejected ballots						
Turnout		%				

1898 British Columbia general election
Party	Candidate	Votes	%	±%	Expenditures	Elected
Opposition	Charles William Munro	301	55.03	–	Unknown	✓
Government	John Herbert Turner	246	44.97%	–	Unknown	
Total valid votes		547	100.00%			
Total rejected ballots						
Turnout		%				

1900 British Columbia general election
Party	Candidate	Votes	%	±%	Expenditures	Elected
Progressive	Charles William Munro	267	51.54		Unknown	✓
Conservative	George Randall Ashwell	251	48.46%		Unknown	
Total valid votes		518	100.00%			
Total rejected ballots						
Turnout		%				

== See also ==
- List of British Columbia provincial electoral districts
- Canadian provincial electoral districts
