= Vant =

Vant may refer to:

- Vant (band), British punk band
- Neil Vant, Canadian clergyman and politician
- Turmite, a Turing machine in computer science
- in India, the title for a high rank amongst the ennobled Hindu retainers of the Nizam of Hyderabad, equivalent to the Muslim nobiliary title Molk

== See also ==
- Vantaa
