= James Punch =

James Punch MLA

Member of the Legislative Assembly of British Columbia for Westminster
- In office June 13, 1890 – July 7, 1894 Serving with Thomas Edwin Kitchen and Colin Buchanan Sword
- Preceded by: district established
- Succeeded by: district abolished

7th Mayor of Surrey
- In office 1888–1890
- Preceded by: Thomas Shannon
- Succeeded by: H. T. Thrift and William Brown

Personal details
- Born: c. 1841 Nova Scotia
- Died: 1922
- Spouse: Jane McKay (m. 1871)

James Punch was a Canadian politician in British Columbia. He was the mayor of Surrey, British Columbia from 1888 to 1890, and was elected to the Legislative Assembly of British Columbia from 1890 to 1894. Punch attempted to be re-elected in 1894 but was unsuccessful. Alongside his political career, Punch was a prominent businessman in Brownsville and was the proprietor of the Brownsville Hotel from 1882 to 1897.

== Electoral record ==
1890 British Columbia general election: Westminster
Party	Candidate	Votes	%	Elected
Government	John Robson	506	17.66	✓
Opposition	Thomas Edwin Kitchen	503	17.55	✓
Independent	James Punch	484	16.89	✓
Independent	Colin Buchanan Sword	461	16.08	
Government	John A. Kirkland	420	14.65	
Government	John Calvin Henderson	349	12.18	
Independent	Arthur Herring	81	2.83	
Opposition	Marshall Sinclair	62	2.16	
Total valid votes		2,866	100.00	
Source: Elections BC
Note: Robson also won the seat of Cariboo in the 1890 general election, and resigned his Westminster seat prior to the first session of the new legislature. Sword won the subsequent by-election on November 7, 1890.

Template:1894 British Columbia general election/Westminster-Delta
