= John Houston (newspaperman) =

Canadian journalist and politician

John Houston (November 1850–March 8, 1910) was a newspaper publisher and politician in British Columbia.

== Newspaper publisher ==
Born in Alton, Canada West (now Ontario), Houston's career as a newspaper publisher in British Columbia spanned twenty-two years, beginning in 1888 in the town of Donald. Later he would publish newspapers in New Westminster, Nelson, Rossland and Prince Rupert. His last paper would be printed in 1910 at South Fort George. John was married, though his wife, Edith May Keeley, didn't follow him on his constant ramblings throughout the province and stayed at their mansion in Nelson.

== First mayor of Nelson ==
John Houston was the first mayor of Nelson, British Columbia and served from 1897 to 1905.

== Political career ==
John Houston was a member of the Legislative Assembly of British Columbia for West Kootenay-Nelson from 1900 to 1903 and Nelson City from 1903 until 1907. During this time, he became well known for being a working-man's advocate and he often spoke against the policies of the Canadian Pacific Railway and supported a motion to stop provincial aid to railways. He was defeated when he ran as an independent candidate in the 1907 provincial election in the riding of Ymir.

== Prince Rupert ==
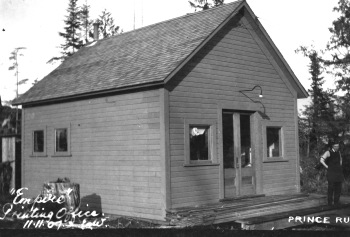
Empire newspaper office 1907

Houston moved to Prince Rupert in summer 1907 to start the Prince Rupert Empire newspaper. In this paper he planned to continue his vocal opposition to the policies of the railroad, this time the Grand Trunk Pacific Railway. The GTP knew full well of John's reputation and did not appreciate his presence in Prince Rupert—their terminus, and a town they had grand designs for. Before John could print a single edition, the GTP harbor engineer impounded his printing press in a small shed on the wharf. Undeterred, John decided to have his paper published in Victoria and when the first edition got to Prince Rupert, it carried the headline that the GTP discourages newcomers to town. Other editions followed, and for two months, the Victoria-based Prince Rupert Empire blazed with editorials, prose and often poetry, describing the railway managers as "tin-gods" and accusing them of "a thousand blunders". After only two months of editions, the Empire had sold 10,000 copies of a paper originally meant for a population of 500. Then, with the assistance of a local constable, John liberated his press and continued publishing. Charles Melville Hays, who was then the president of the Grand Trunk Pacific, arrived in Prince Rupert later that year and offered John a permit to put his building wherever he liked. But, by then, John didn't need a lot in Prince Rupert. He had filed on a mineral claim near the wharf and had built the Empire Newspaper Office. If Charles Hays had hoped that his intended cooperation with John would gain the railroad favor with the Empire, he must've been sorely disappointed. John began encouraging other people to squat on the mineral claims by the wharf, instead of buying lots in the new GTP townsite, thus creating the community of Knoxville. The Grand Trunk Pacific had had enough. When the lots at Prince Rupert went up for sale in 1909, the land John Houston's Empire was on was quietly bought by the railway themselves. John sold his newspaper for $10,000 and left for Fort George.

== Fort George ==
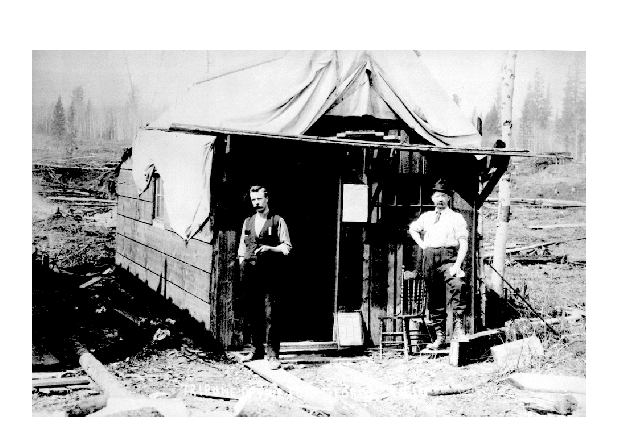
Fort George Tribune office, John Houston on left

John Houston arrived in Fort George in the fall of 1909 and bought property in South Fort George and began the Fort George Tribune. The first edition was published on November 6, 1909. Unfortunately, other than land claims notices there was little local news for his paper to report. In 1909, South Fort George was a First Nations village, a sawmill and a Hudson's Bay Store. Less than a dozen new residents lived in the infant town-site in tent shacks. The Grand Trunk Pacific Railway, John's favorite villain, was still far away: not even across the Alberta/BC border on the eastern end of construction, and the construction from the western end at Prince Rupert had just begun. John's South Fort George articles were often humorous and included notices as to whose cow recently had a calf and what he'd had to pay for eggs that week. He commented in one article about how his socks often froze to the floor while he sat at his printing press and worked on the newspaper. Nevertheless, whether there was little news to report or not, John was a busy man from November 1909 to March 1910. He responded to approximately 300 letters a month, written mostly by parties interested in purchasing land in the area, and he was working on formulating a platform for the Liberal Party. In March 1910, the work and excessively cold caught up with him and John contracted pneumonia and was pulled on a toboggan down the Blackwater Trail to the Quesnel hospital by his friend and fellow pioneer settler, William J Cooke. John died on March 8 at the hospital in Quesnel, but not before he got a chance to read his own obituary, one printed in error by the Vancouver Province. His nurse, knowing his sense of humor, showed him the article, and he supposedly joked that he respected the paper and that they didn't need to make a correction because he was planning on making good on their story. John was laid to rest in Nelson, where there is a memorial in his honor.

=== Places named after John Houston ===
- Houston, British Columbia
- Houston Lane in Prince George, British Columbia
