= Donald Morrison MacKay =

Member of the Legislative Assembly of British Columbia
- In office 1933–1937
- Preceded by: Roderick MacKenzie
- Succeeded by: Louis LeBourdais
- Constituency: Cariboo

Personal details
- Born: October 9, 1889 Goderich, Ontario
- Died: May 19, 1953 (aged 63) Ottawa, Ontario
- Party: British Columbia Liberal Party
- Spouse: Marion Campbell Kenning
- Occupation: land surveyor

Donald Morrison MacKay (October 9, 1889 – May 19, 1953) was a Canadian politician. He served in the Legislative Assembly of British Columbia from 1933 to 1937 from the electoral district of Cariboo, a member of the Liberal party. He resigned in 1937 to become Commissioner of Indian Affairs for British Columbia.
