= Ralph Chetwynd =

British-Canadian businessman and politician

Ralph Chetwynd MC
- Ralph and Frances Chetwynd (1954)

Member of the British Columbia Legislative Assembly for Cariboo
- In office June 12, 1952 – April 3, 1957
- Preceded by: Angus MacLean
- Succeeded by: William C. Speare

Personal details
- Born: June 26, 1888 Staffordshire, England
- Died: April 3, 1957 (aged 66) Saanich, British Columbia, Canada
- Party: British Columbia Social Credit Party
- Occupation: businessman

The Honourable William Ralph Talbot Chetwynd MC (July 28, 1890 – April 3, 1957) was a British-Canadian businessman and politician. The town of Chetwynd, British Columbia was named in his honor.

Born in Staffordshire, England, he was the younger brother of Sir (Arthur Henry) Talbot Chetwynd, 7th Baronet. He came to Canada at the age of eighteen, and was soon in Ashcroft, British Columbia (west of Kamloops Lake). He received employment from Charles Paget, 6th Marquess of Anglesey (nephew of Lady Florence Cecilia Paget, who was married to Chetwynd's first cousin once removed Sir George, 4th Baronet) to manage Anglesey's fruit farm holdings at Walhachin.

On October 8, 1912, he married Frances Mary Jupe, daughter of James Jupe of Mere, Wiltshire.

He fought in World War I as a member of the Royal Field Artillery, attaining the rank of lieutenant therein. He received the Military Cross (MC) in 1918 for his service. The citation for his MC, which appeared in The London Gazette in November 1918, reads as follows:

For conspicuous gallantry and devotion to duty. Under shell fire of a very intense description he attended to a wounded soldier, who was lying out in the open, unable to move, and having bandaged him, carried him into safety in a quarry near by, with the assistance of stretcher bearers.

After returning from Europe, he entered cattle ranching and the transportation business needed to get the cattle and other agriculture products to eastern markets. As a fruit grower and rancher, he saw both the potential for the Cariboo and Peace River Country, but also the need for efficient rail transportation to serve the region.

In 1942 he became the public relations officer for Pacific Great Eastern Railway (PGE; later BC Rail; now part of the CN Rail system), a post he held until 1952; he also served as a director of the PGE. He was a big advocate for building a railroad to central British Columbia. Running as a member from the District of Cariboo, he was elected to the provincial legislature in 1952. He served on the Executive Council of British Columbia as Minister of Trade and Industry, Minister of Railways, Minister of Fisheries and also as Minister of Agriculture. He died in office on April 3, 1957.

Full of confidence, in 1954 he said the southern extension of the PGE between Squamish and North Vancouver would be completed by June 11, 1956. Many doubted this optimistic timeline, and 40 people bet him a hat that he was wrong. When the first train rolled into North Vancouver at 4:14pm that day, Chetwynd won 40 hats.

Chetwynd died at Victoria, British Columbia on April 3, 1957.

Rail service arrived in Little Prairie in April 1958. It would bring an economic transformation to the area, which until then had to rely on trucks to get any goods, such as timber, out of the valley.

The Premier of British Columbia, W.A.C. Bennett, renamed the PGE station at Little Prairie to Chetwynd, in his honour, and the town of Little Prairie soon changed its name in 1959.
