= William C. Speare =

Canadian politician (1915-1999)

William Collins Speare

Member of the British Columbia Legislative Assembly for Cariboo
- In office September 9, 1957 – October 26, 1966
- Preceded by: Ralph Chetwynd
- Succeeded by: Robert Bonner

Personal details
- Born: August 24, 1915 Winnipeg, Manitoba
- Died: May 31, 1999 (aged 83) Quesnel, British Columbia
- Party: British Columbia Social Credit Party

William Collins Speare (August 24, 1915 – May 31, 1999) was a Canadian politician who served as a member of the Legislative Assembly (MLA) of British Columbia from 1957 to 1966, representing the constituency of Cariboo as part of the British Columbia Social Credit Party caucus.

Born in Winnipeg, he worked as an administrator at the Cariboo General Hospital and Quesnel's G.R. Baker Memorial Hospital. He was elected to the BC legislature in a 1957 by-election, triggered by the death of Cariboo MLA Ralph Chetwynd. He was re-elected in the 1960 and 1963 provincial elections, and served as the deputy speaker of the legislature in the 27th Parliament from 1964 to 1966. After winning re-election in 1966, Speare resigned his seat that October to make way for Attorney General Robert Bonner, who lost his own seat in Vancouver-Point Grey; Bonner went on to win the November 1966 by-election.
