= John Thomas Wilmot Place =

Canadian politician

John T. W. Place

Member of the Legislative Assembly of British Columbia
- In office 1912–1916
- Preceded by: James Hurst Hawthornthwaite
- Succeeded by: none, district abolished
- Constituency: Nanaimo City

Personal details
- Born: June 21, 1880 Crewe, Cheshire, England
- Died: December 29, 1952 (aged 72) Nanaimo, British Columbia
- Party: Social Democratic Party of Canada
- Spouse: Sarah Crawford Neilson
- Occupation: civil servant

John Thomas Wilmot Place (June 21, 1880 – December 29, 1952) was a Canadian politician. He served in the Legislative Assembly of British Columbia from 1912 to 1916 from the electoral district of Nanaimo City, a member of the Social Democratic Party.
