= James M. Kellie =

Canadian politician

James M. "Pothole" Kellie (December 6, 1848 – December 12, 1927) was a miner and political figure in British Columbia. He represented West Kootenay from 1890 to 1894, West Kootenay North from 1894 to 1898 and West Kootenay-Revelstoke from 1898 to 1899 in the Legislative Assembly of British Columbia.

He was born in Cobourg, Canada West; his parents were natives of Scotland.

Kellie acquired the nickname of "Pothole" when he was prospecting for gold in Golden around 1884. He was convinced that there was gold to be found in two deep potholes in Canyon Creek. Kellie and his two partners eventually succeeded in diverting the creek, only to find the decaying leg of a mountain goat.

In 1889, Kellie and twelve other miners upset with taxation on their mines persuaded John Robson, who was passing through by train, to stop over and listen to their complaints. The outcome was that Kellie was elected to the assembly and was able to sit on the committee drafting a new Mineral and Placer Mining Act. He later served in the cabinet as Minister of Mines.

Kellie mined quartz in the Kootenay region. In 1890, he moved to Revelstoke, where he founded the Miners' Association. Kellie retired from politics in 1899 to look after his mining and lumber business interests. In 1913, he moved to Victoria.
