= Louis LeBourdais =

Canadian politician

Member of the Legislative Assembly of British Columbia
- In office 1937–1947
- Preceded by: Donald Morrison MacKay
- Succeeded by: Walter Hogg
- Constituency: Cariboo

Personal details
- Born: June 26, 1888 Clinton, British Columbia
- Died: September 27, 1947 (aged 59) Quesnel, British Columbia
- Party: British Columbia Liberal Party
- Occupation: Telegrapher, journalist

Louis Adelbert LeBourdais (June 26, 1888 – September 27, 1947) was a telegraph operator, life insurance agent and political figure in British Columbia, Canada. He represented Cariboo in the Legislative Assembly of British Columbia from 1937 to 1947 as a Liberal.

He was born in 1888, the son of Adelbert LeBourdais and Eleanor Connick, and was educated in Clinton and New Westminster. LeBourdais married Kate-Elizabeth Pughe on April 17, 1912 at Larkin, British Columbia (halfway between Vernon and Armstrong). He lived in Quesnel. LeBourdais had mining interests in the Barkerville area. He was also an amateur historian. From 1941 to 1947, he was a member of a Liberal-Conservative coalition in the provincial assembly. LeBourdais died in office in 1947.

LeBourdais Park in Quesnel was named after him.
