= Alex Fraser Research Forest =

The Alex Fraser Research Forest is 98.02 km^{2} of crown land in the Cariboo region of British Columbia, Canada. It is managed by the Faculty of Forestry at the University of British Columbia, to create opportunities for education, research and demonstration of sustainable forest management and to produce a sustainable flow of values in a financially self-sufficient manner. The forest is named after Alex Fraser who was a politician; the Alex Fraser Bridge in Vancouver was also named for him.

== See also ==
- Conservation movement
- Environmental protection
