= East Kootenay South =

Defunct provincial electoral district in British Columbia, Canada

East Kootenay South was an electoral district in the Canadian province of British Columbia in the 1898 and 1900 elections. Its official name was East Kootenay (South Riding). It was created by the partition of the old East Kootenay riding which also created its sibling, East Kootenay (North Riding). Successor ridings in the East Kootenay region were Cranbrook, Fernie, and Columbia.

== Election results ==
Election winners are in bold.

8th British Columbia election, 1898
Party	Candidate	Votes	%	±	Expenditures
Opposition	William Baillie	144	47.52%	–	unknown
Government	**James Baker**	**159**	**52.48%**	–	unknown
Total valid votes		303	100.00%		
Total rejected ballots					
Turnout		%			

9th British Columbia election, 1900
Party	Candidate	Votes	%	±	Expenditures
Conservative	John Ryan Costigan	171	17.41%		unknown
Independent	William Fernie	383	39.00%		unknown
Government	**Edwin Clarke Smith**	**428**	**43.58%**	–	unknown
Total valid votes		982	100.00%		
Total rejected ballots					
Turnout		55.37%			

== See also ==
- List of British Columbia provincial electoral districts
- Canadian provincial electoral districts
- Kootenay (electoral districts)
