= John MacKay Yorston =

Canadian politician

John MacKay Yorston (11 October 1867 – 27 May 1937) was a farmer and political figure in British Columbia.

== Early life ==
John (Jack) MacKay Yorston was born on Sanday Island, Scotland on 11 October 1867 to Robert and Mary Yorston. Leaving the Orkney Islands where educated, John and younger brother Robert arrived in Canada during the 1890s. By 1900, John was the BC Express (BX) superintendent and agent at 150 Mile House. In partnership with Robert, he bought the Australian Ranch in November 1903. In spring 1904, he resigned from the BX to work full time at the ranch.

== Political career ==
As Liberal candidate, he represented Cariboo 1907–1909 and 1916–1924. He was defeated when he ran for re-election in 1909 and 1924.

A factor in Yorston being elected in 1907 was the ongoing unlikelihood of a railway line being constructed through the Cariboo in a timely manner, for which the early caution of the Conservative administration received much blame. Despite railways being a major local issue, a general swing against the Liberals cost Yorston his seat in 1909.

In 1912, he was elected vice-president of the Quesnel Liberal Association.

Although the Conservative administration had promised late in the election to extend the Pacific Great Eastern Railway (PGE) northward to Quesnel, Yorston regained his seat in 1916. On forming government that year, the Liberals appointed a select committee to investigate allegations of corruption regarding the PGE construction under the previous Conservative administration. Yorston, who during his election campaign had promised to fight such corruption, became a member of this committee. The absence of a railway line in the North Cariboo hampered the transportation of agricultural produce. Local lobbying influenced Yorston and the minister of agriculture to provide BX with a freight subsidy of $10,000 annually from 1918 for the Soda Creek–Prince George steamboat run. Similar lobbying prompted Yorston to promise in 1919 that the government would build a creamery at Quesnel.

The Liberal lack of a coherent railway policy cost Yorston his seat in 1924.

In 1933, he was expected to receive the Liberal nomination for his old seat, but it went to Donald Morrison MacKay.

== Marriage and children ==
In May 1898, he married Isabella Jessie Y. Fea, who died in childbirth that October.

In March 1909, he married Janet Mary Robertson (1888–1984).

Their six children were John Raymond (c.1911), James Keith (c.1915), Margaret (?), Donald Robertson (?), Kathleen Mary (c.1923), and Eileen Jean (c.1924).

== Farming and death ==
The Yorston ranch, which was significantly larger than the average farm, played a key role in the regional agriculture. Being a developed farm at the time of purchase, the brothers could focus on productivity as the market expanded, while other settlers struggled to create capacity. Furthermore, the partnership arrangement provided flexibility, which allowed John to enter politics.

John died in his home district on 27 May 1937. H.G. Perry was an honorary pallbearer at the funeral.
