= H. T. Thrift =

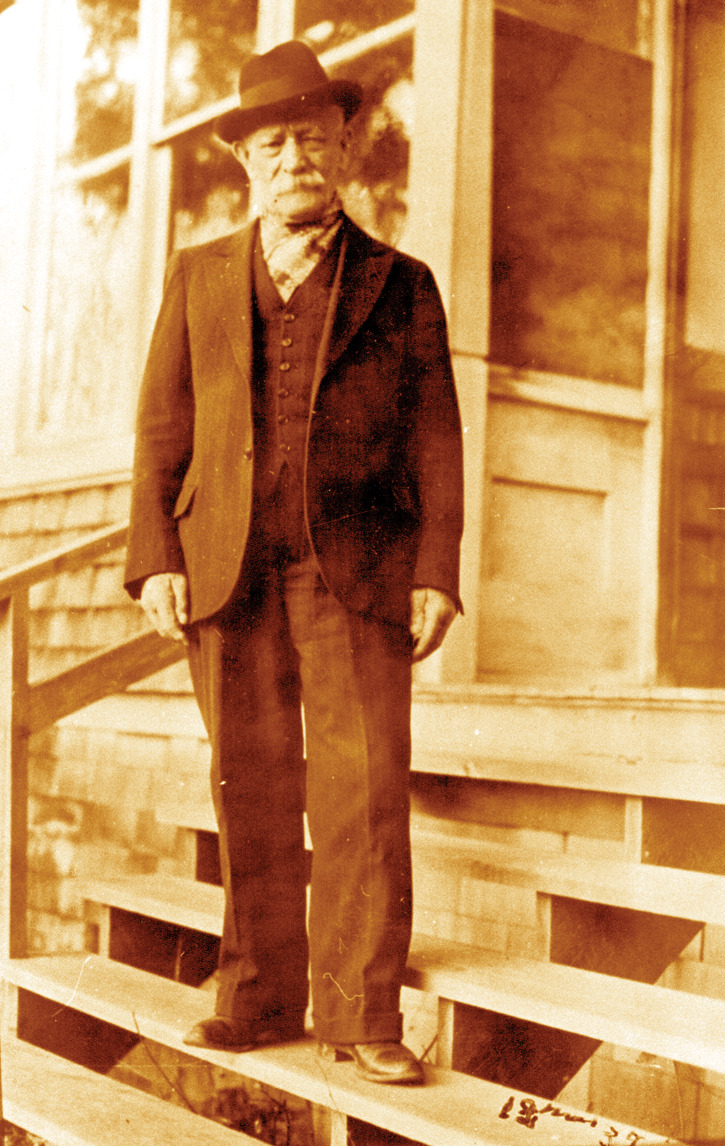
- Thrift on the steps of his Buena Vista Avenue home in 1910

Reeve of Surrey
- In office 1891 Serving with William Brown
- Preceded by: James Punch
- Succeeded by: William Brown and W.J. Walker

Personal details
- Born: May 26, 1851 Farnborough, Hampshire, England
- Died: February 23, 1946 (aged 94) White Rock, British Columbia
- Spouse: Margaret Martha McMenamy
- Occupation: Real estate agent, brickmaker

Henry Thomas Thrift (May 26, 1851 – February 23, 1946) was a pioneer settler of the Surrey, British Columbia area. A real estate agent and brick maker, he served on the Surrey City Council as a clerk for many years, and also briefly rose to the position of reeve.

== Biography ==
Thrift was born at Farnborough, Hampshire, England in 1852. He served in the military at Hampshire. Thrift immigrated to Canada in 1874, following the death of his wife, whom he had three children with. He initially settled in Eastern Canada, but later travelled to California, and later British Columbia, travelling to Surrey for the first time in 1880. He settled in the area, Cloverdale (later to be incorporated with Surrey), as he stated, "the name Surrey sounded like home". In 1884, he was working as a brick maker at Yale, British Columbia.

Thrift was active in the affairs of Surrey, British Columbia, serving as a municipal clerk for the town's council in 1883, and from 1886 to 1890. He was reeve of Surrey along with William Brown in 1891, serving until his resignation. He had helped develop the first school in Surrey in 1882, and played a role in requesting the land for Peace Arch Park in 1886. In 1888, Thrift served as the city's health officer during a smallpox outbreak. In 1903, he was involved in petitioning the federal government for construction of a bridge over the Fraser River. He was also at a time secretary-treasurer of the International Railway and Development Company. He moved to White Rock, British Columbia in 1910. There he taught Sunday School and organized a Boy Scouts' Association. He also owned the property on which the first school of that city was built.

Also active in the real estate industry, he donated land for Hazelmere United Church to be built on in 1905, and land for a school in 1910. He was also a former Grand Master of the British Columbia Orange Lodge. He married Margaret McMenamy in 1877 and had nine children with her.

Thrift died of bronchopneumonia at White Rock in 1946, at the age of 94. He is buried at the Hazelmere Cemetery in Surrey.

== Legacy ==
Thrift Avenue in White Rock is named in his honour, as well as H.T. Thrift Elementary School, in Surrey.
