= North Nanaimo =

Defunct provincial electoral district in British Columbia, Canada

North Nanaimo was a provincial electoral district in British Columbia, Canada, in the 1894, 1898, and 1900 elections only.

== Election results ==
Note: Winners of each election are in bold.

7th British Columbia election, 1894
Party	Candidate	Votes	%	±	Expenditures
Government	**John Bryden**	**411**	**74.73%**	–	unknown
Labour	Ralph Smith^{1}	139	25.27%		unknown
Total valid votes		550	100.00%		
Total rejected ballots					
Turnout		%			
^{1} Nominated by the Nanaimo Reform Club, which had been set up by the Opposition but was dominated by the Miners' and Mine-Labourers' Protective Association (MMLPA). The slate was described as "a labor ticket on a labor platform, but with outside support." (T.R. Loosmore, "The British Columbia Labor Movement and Political Action, 1878-1906", 1954, p. 67(2).)

8th British Columbia election, 1898
Party	Candidate	Votes	%	±	Expenditures
Government	**John Bryden**	**249**	**61.94%**	–	unknown
Opposition	Walter James G. Hellier	153	38.06%	–	unknown
Total valid votes		402	100.00%		
Total rejected ballots					
Turnout		%			

1900 British Columbia general election
Party	Candidate	Votes	%
Independent	William Wallace Burns McInnes^{3}	238	47.04
Opposition	John Bryden	195	38.54
Independent Labour	John D. Dixon^{2}	73	14.43
Total valid votes		506	100.00
^{2} N(I)LP candidate supported by Provincial Party.^{3} Son of Lieutenant-Governor of British Columbia Thomas Robert McInnes.

The riding was redistributed before the 1903 election. Successor ridings were (roughly) Nanaimo City, Newcastle, and The Islands.

== See also ==
- List of British Columbia provincial electoral districts
- Canadian provincial electoral districts
- List of electoral districts in Greater Nanaimo
