= James Murphy (Canadian politician) =

Canadian politician

James Murphy (March 9, 1872 – January 16, 1921) was a lawyer and political figure in British Columbia. He represented Cariboo from 1903 to 1907 in the Legislative Assembly of British Columbia as a Liberal.

He was born in Cariboo, British Columbia, the son of Denis Murphy, and was educated there and at Ottawa University. Murphy was called to the British Columbia bar in 1897. He practised in Revelstoke, Armstrong and Kamloops. He died in 1921 at the age of 48 after accidentally slipping and drowning in the Thompson River.
