= Roderick Mackenzie (politician) =

Canadian politician

MLA for Cariboo
- In office 1928–1933

Personal details
- Born: January 5, 1868 Applecross, Scotland
- Died: April 29, 1957 (aged 89) Vancouver, British Columbia
- Party: Conservative
- Occupation: Merchant - Mackenzie's Ltd.

Roderick Mackenzie (January 5, 1868 – April 29, 1957) was a Canadian politician and pioneer merchant. He served in the Legislative Assembly of British Columbia from 1928 until he was defeated in the 1933 election, from the electoral district of Cariboo, as a Conservative.

Roderick was a merchant from Williams Lake. Born in Applecross, Scotland a remote peninsula across from the Isle of Skye which could only be accessed by boat in the winter until the 1950s. He was the son of Murdo and Mary Mackenzie. Roderick served in South Africa as a soldier in the Boer War in 1899 as part of the Highland Regiment. He later returned there to work as a merchant. He married Elizabeth Maclagan of Perth, whom he met while she acted as the hostess of Lord Middleton's Applecross estate. Her relative was the Factor of the estate. Since he was a bachelor, he asked her to join him to be the hostess there.

In Rosebank, South Africa, now part of Johannesburg, Roderick and Elizabeth had three children, Iain, Anne and John. Iain died as an infant of dysentery.

The family emigrated to Canada in 1908 and Roderick, along with business partner Jim Fraser, started Mackenzie's Ltd. in Squamish in 1912, where their youngest son Alistair was born. In 1918, Mackenzie and Fraser opened another store in Williams Lake at the very beginning of the town's formation. In 1921, a fire burned down most of the businesses on Railway Avenue, but Mackenzie and Fraser rebuilt. In 1924, Fraser left Roderick to run Mackenzie's Ltd. on his own. In his book, The Fraser, Bruce Hutchinson mentioned Roderick as a renowned and visionary salesman and merchant.

The Squamish store was later run by Alistair Mackenzie and his wife Pauline. A third store in Wells was opened in the 1930s and was run by eldest son Jack. The Williams Lake store was later run by daughter Anne's husband, Douglas Stevenson.

Railway Avenue in Williams Lake became Mackenzie Avenue, named for the store and the family that ran it. The creation of Scout Island Park is a legacy of Roderick Mackenzie's term as an MLA. The Mackenzie family donated land to the city for a golf course. Golf was a passion for Roderick and his daughter Anne. The golf course was later demolished to create the Boitano Mall, and another golf course was created.

Roderick and Elizabeth Mackenzie's daughter, Anne Mackenzie Stevenson, was a teacher and school counselor in Williams Lake. She had a junior high school named after her. When the school was incorporated into a new Williams Lake campus for Thompson Rivers University, the library was named for her. In 1982, Anne was given an honorary doctorate from Simon Fraser University for her work in education.
