= Nanaimo City =

Former provincial electoral district in British Columbia, Canada

Nanaimo City was a provincial electoral district in the city of Nanaimo, British Columbia in Canada from 1890 to 1912. It was one of two Nanaimo ridings at the time, created out of the older Nanaimo riding (1871 to 1928), with intermediary ridings The Islands and Nanaimo and the Islands. The name Nanaimo was restored as a riding name in the 1966 election.

For other current and historical federal and provincial Nanaimo-area ridings please see Nanaimo (electoral districts).

== Demographics ==
Population, 1911	
Population Change, 1891–1911	%
Area (km^{2})	
Pop. Density (people per km^{2})	

== Other historical Nanaimo ridings ==
- Nanaimo, 1871–1928
- Nanaimo and the Islands -1963
- South Nanaimo
- North Nanaimo
- The Islands

No riding named Nanaimo existed in the 1909 or 1912 elections; the Nanaimo-area ridings were Nanaimo City and The Islands.

The riding of Newcastle, which covered the southern and upland parts of metropolitan Nanaimo and the Gulf Islands to the southeast, first appeared in the 1903 election, along with a reconstituted The Islands, which lasted until the 1937 election. In 1924 Cowichan and Newcastle were joined to form Cowichan-Newcastle riding. Part of the former Islands riding is now represented by North Saanich and the Islands, previously called Saanich and the Islands.

== Current Nanaimo-area ridings ==
- Nanaimo 1996–present
- Nanaimo-Parksville

== Election results ==
This riding has elected the following members of the Legislative Assembly of British Columbia: Note: Winners of each election are in bold.

6th British Columbia election, 1890
Party	Candidate	Votes	%	±	Expenditures
**Labour ^{1}**	**Thomas Keith**	**Accl.**	-.- %		unknown
Total valid votes		n/a	-.- %		
Total rejected ballots					
Turnout		%			
^{1} The first labour candidates elected to the legislature. Forster and Keith were both nominated by the Miners' and Mine Labourers' Protective Association (MMLPA) and campaigned on the "Workingmen's Platform" of the Workingmen's Campaign Committee.

7th British Columbia election, 1894
Party	Candidate	Votes	%	±	Expenditures
**Labour**	**Thomas Keith**	411	48.81%		unknown
Government	**James McGregor**	**431**	**51.19%**	–	unknown
Total valid votes		842	100.00%		
Total rejected ballots					
Turnout		%			

8th British Columbia election, 1898
Party	Candidate	Votes	%	±	Expenditures
Government	Archibald McGregor	170	20.05%	–	unknown
Opposition	**Robert Edward McKechnie**	**678**	**79.95%**	–	unknown
Total valid votes		848	100.00%		
Total rejected ballots					
Turnout		55.37%			

9th British Columbia election, 1900
Party	Candidate	Votes	%	±	Expenditures
Labour ^{2}	**Ralph Smith**	763	89.87%		unknown
Government	James Stuart Yates	86	10.13%	–	unknown
Total valid votes		849	100.00%		
Total rejected ballots					
Turnout		%			
^{2} Nanaimo (Independent) Labour Party candidate supported by R.E. McKechnie, former Member and supporter of the Provincial Party. Also endorsed by Nanaimo Trades and Labour Council. The N(I)LP appears to have been only loosely organized although a detailed platform was drawn up.

10th British Columbia election, 1903
Party	Candidate	Votes	%	±	Expenditures
Socialist	**James Hurst Hawthornthwaite**	**486**	**43.98%**	–	unknown
Conservative	Edward Quennell	325	29.41%		unknown
Nanaimo (Independent) Labour Party ^{3}	Henry (Harry) Shepherd	294	26.61%		unknown
Total valid votes		1,105	100.00%		
Total rejected ballots					
Turnout		%			
^{3} Nominated by the Nanaimo (Independent) Labour Party which had the support and participation of local Liberals (Loosmore, pp. 195–6). During the 1907 election he was referred to as having been a "Liberal-Labour candidate" in the 1903 election.

11th British Columbia election, 1907
Party	Candidate	Votes	%	±	Expenditures
Socialist	**James Hurst Hawthornthwaite**	**455**	**50.22%**	–	unknown
Conservative	Robert Stuart Brock O'Brian	161	17.77%		unknown
Independent) Labour Party ^{4}	Henry (Harry) Shepherd	290	32.01%		unknown
Total valid votes		906	100.00%		
Total rejected ballots					
Turnout		%			
^{4} The nomination list printed in the newspapers identifies Shepherd as a Liberal. CPG labels both Shepherd and Thomas "Socialists" and Gosnell (who spells Shepherd as Sheppard, as do some other sources) has them as "L.-Soc.", which could be either Liberal or Labour-Socialist. One newspaper refers to Shepherd as a member of the "Nanaimo Liberal Party", another as a nominee of the "Independent Labour Party", "a peculiar combination of Liberal politicians" (Vancouver Province 29 December 1906, p. 1). Thomas is also reported as a nominee of the "Independent Labour Party" in Ladysmith. Shepherd ran as a Liberal in 1912, Thomas as a straight Independent in 1909.

12th British Columbia election, 1909
Party	Candidate	Votes	%	±	Expenditures
Socialist	**James Hurst Hawthornthwaite**	**786**	**62.88%**	–	unknown
Conservative	Albert Edward Planta	464	37.12%		unknown
Total valid votes		1,250	100.00%		
Total rejected ballots					
Turnout		%			

13th British Columbia election, 1912
Party	Candidate	Votes	%	±	Expenditures
Social Democratic	**John Thomas Wilmot Place**	621	39.45%		
Conservative	Albert Edward Planta	**578**	**36.72%**		unknown
Liberal	Henry (Harry) Shepherd	375	23.82%		unknown
Total valid votes		1,574	100.00%		
Total rejected ballots					
Turnout		%			

The name Nanaimo City was dropped after the 1912 election. In the 1916 election the Nanaimo name was used.
