= List of electoral districts in Greater Nanaimo =

Nanaimo is the name of several Canadian federal and British Columbia provincial electoral districts, both historical and current, in and around the Vancouver Island city of Nanaimo, British Columbia, Canada. Ridings "descended" from the original Nanaimo riding are also listed.

== Federal ==
=== Current ===
- Nanaimo—Ladysmith, federal electoral district since 2015

=== Historical ===
- Nanaimo—Cowichan—The Islands, federal electoral district 1968–1976
- Nanaimo (electoral district), federal electoral district 1903–1962
- Nanaimo—Alberni, federal electoral district 1976-1987; 1996–2015
- Nanaimo—Cowichan, federal electoral district 1987–2015

== Provincial ==
=== Current ===
- Nanaimo-Gabriola Island 2024–present
- Nanaimo-Lantzville 2024–present

=== Historical ===
- Nanaimo City 1890–1912
- Nanaimo (provincial electoral district) 1871–1890; 1916–1928; 1966–2020
- Alberni-Nanaimo 1933–1937
- Nanaimo and The Islands 1941–1963
- South Nanaimo 1894–1900
- North Nanaimo 1894–1900
- Nanaimo-Parksville 2001–2005
- The Islands 1890; 1903–1937
- Newcastle (electoral district) 1903–1920
- Cowichan-Newcastle 1924–1963
- Nanaimo-North Cowichan 2009–2020

Nanaimo riding did not appear in the 1909 election, but Nanaimo City and The Islands were the Nanaimo-area ridings in the 1909 or 1912 election. The riding of Newcastle appeared in the 1903 election, as did The Islands. For the 1924 election parts of Newcastle (electoral district) helped form the new riding of Cowichan-Newcastle.

== See also ==
- List of British Columbia provincial electoral districts
- Canadian provincial electoral districts
