= Australian, British Columbia =

Australian
- Location of Australian in British Columbia
- Coordinates: 52°43′59″N 122°27′04″W
- Country: Canada
- Province: British Columbia
- Region: North Cariboo
- North Cariboo: Cariboo
- Time zone: UTC−07:00 (PT)
- Area codes: 250, 778, 236, & 672
- Highway: Highway 97

Australian is an unincorporated community on the east side of the Fraser River in the North Cariboo region of central British Columbia. On BC Highway 97, the locality is by road about 85 kilometres (53 mi) north of Williams Lake and 33 kilometres (21 mi) south of Quesnel.

== Name origin ==
In 1861, gold prospectors Andrew Olson (alt. Olesen, Olsen), William and Stephen Downes, and George Cook, who met in Victoria (Australia), were drawn to the Colony of British Columbia by the Fraser Canyon Gold Rush. Determining that farming would likely be more lucrative, the four formed a partnership and had pre-empted several parcels in the area by June 1863. They built a log cabin on the higher slopes, called the Palace Hotel, which served as a roadhouse, but business was not brisk because most travelled on the Soda Creek–Quesnel steamboat. The following spring, they planted potatoes about 1.6 kilometres (1 mi) northwest on lower more arable ground beside the creek. The Australian background of the founders reflected in the local name of "The Australian's Place" which emerged for the ranch, then later as the "Australian Ranch". Australian Creek derived its name from the adjacent ranch.

== Partnership era ==
After the buyer of their 1864 potato crop never paid them, the disillusioned George Cook left the partnership. When the 1865 extension of the Cariboo Road to Quesnel bypassed the Palace Hotel, the men built a substantial two-storey log roadhouse beside the road at the creek site in 1866. Becoming known as "Australian House", the stop served meals to stage passengers while BC Express (BX) changed the horses.

The grain, hay, and vegetable crops grown during the 1870s and 1880s ranch development supplied miners, as did the slaughterhouse, which processed the large herd of cattle and dairy cows. In 1872, William Downes died of tuberculosis, leaving Andrew Olson and Stephen Downes as equal partners. After an 1886 fire burned down the BX barn, rebuilding was immediate. In 1898, Stephen died. In 1900, the ranch was advertised for sale.

== Yorston era ==
In 1903, John (Jack) MacKay Yorston and his younger brother Robert bought the ranch. Jack was the BX agent at 150 Mile House, and Robert drove the Quesnel–Barkerville stage. In 1905, Robert built a two-storey log house prior to his wedding in the new year. When the roadhouse and this house burned to the ground in 1906, they built a two-storey frame house as a replacement. Five of the upstairs bedrooms were for guests and two for family.

The Australian post office operated from a residence 1923–1947. When lightning struck the ranch in 1929, a barn collapsed upon the cows inside, killing one and stunning an employee.

John died in 1937 and Robert in 1943. The roadhouse closed the next year.

By the 1950s, the highway had been relocated to higher ground. When a road culvert failed in 1955, a torrent of water reached 3.7 metres (12 ft) up the ranch buildings, causing damage estimated at more than $50,000. The dilapidated former roadhouse was demolished a year later.

An annual fall corn maze was introduced in 2004, with a haunted house added in 2005. The ranch is a 300 grass fed beef cow operation, which has expanded into dog food production and selling perennial flowers locally. In 2019, the ranch, managed by the fifth generation of the family, was recognized with a Century Farm Award for over 100 years of ranching in BC.

== Railway ==
The development of the Pacific Great Eastern Railway (PGE) mirrors that of Alexandria. The ranch was a flag stop by 1922. The wye was 2.7 kilometres (1.7 mi) south of the former station.

In June 1921, when a handcar collided with a freight train near the rail bridge after dark, the employee on board was not discovered until the next morning. Despite a triple fracture of the skull and a piece of the frontal bone penetrating the brain, an operation at Quesnel hospital was successful. Construction of this trestle bridge over the creek was completed that month.

In 1960, a 199-metre (653 ft) long and 40-metre (130 ft) deep wooden trestle was constructed over the creek on a new alignment about 11 metres (35 ft) east of the old trestle. In 1977, a huge fill replaced the bridge. In 1979, the trestle was dismantled.

== Natural gas compressor station ==
In 1967, Compressor Station – Australian No. 5 was installed on the Westcoast Pipeline. In 2020, a new compressor unit, gas cooler, and building replaced the previous infrastructure.

== See also ==
- List of historic ranches in British Columbia
