= Westminster-Dewdney =

Defunct provincial electoral district in British Columbia, Canada

Westminster-Dewdney was a provincial electoral district of British Columbia, Canada, from 1894 to 1900. It and its sister ridings (Westminster-Delta, Westminster-Chilliwhack, and Westminster-Richmond) were successors to the old four-member Westminster riding, which appeared in 1890 only and was a subdivision of the older New Westminster riding. Westminster-Dewdney was succeeded by the Dewdney riding in the election of 1903. This area is currently part of the Maple Ridge-Mission riding, with its former eastern portions now in Chilliwack-Kent (Dewdney had included Agassiz and Harrison Hot Springs in its first incarnation).

== Electoral history ==
6th British Columbia election, 1894
Party	Candidate	Votes	%	±	Expenditures
Government	John Matthew Lefevre	224	40.65%	–	unknown
Opposition	Colin Buchanan Sword	327	59.35%	–	
Total valid votes		551	100.00%		
Total rejected ballots					
Turnout		%			

7th British Columbia election, 1898
Party	Candidate	Votes	%	±	Expenditures
Government	Richard McBride ^{1}	239	52.23%	–	unknown
Opposition	Charles Whetham	216	47.47%	–	unknown
Total valid votes		455	100.00%		
Total rejected ballots					
Turnout		%			
^{1} 16th Premier of British Columbia

8th British Columbia election, 1900
Party	Candidate	Votes	%	±	Expenditures
Conservative	Richard McBride	338	54.25%		unknown
Government	Charles Whetham	285	45.75%	–	unknown
Total valid votes		623	100.00%		
Total rejected ballots					
Turnout		%			

In the large redistribution in advance of the 1903 election, which provided the basis for the modern system of ridings until the 1990s, the Westminster-Dewdney riding was adjusted slightly and renamed Dewdney, which lasted until the general election of 1986.

== See also ==
- List of British Columbia provincial electoral districts
- Canadian provincial electoral districts
