= Michael Callanan =

Canadian politician (1849–1929)

Member of the Legislative Assembly of British Columbia
- In office 1909–1916
- Constituency: Cariboo

Personal details
- Born: March 29, 1849 Clonakilty, County Cork, Ireland
- Died: February 21, 1929 (aged 79) New Westminster, British Columbia
- Party: British Columbia Conservative Party
- Occupation: physician

Michael Callanan (March 29, 1849 – February 21, 1929) was an Irish-born physician and political figure in British Columbia. He represented Cariboo from 1909 until his retirement at the 1916 election in the Legislative Assembly of British Columbia as a Conservative.

He was born in 1849 in Clonakilty, County Cork, the son of Daniel J. Callanan, and was educated at Trinity College Dublin and in Paris. From 1875 to 1873, he practised in Kilbrittain and Rosscarbery. He came to Canada, settling in the Northwest Territories. Later, Callanan practised in Nanaimo and Victoria for eight years before moving to Quesnel in 1894 and Barkerville in 1899. Callanan was a physician for the Royal Cariboo Hospital in Barkerville. In 1885, he married Hannah Healy. He retired to New Westminster in 1922. In 1929, Callanan died at St. Mary's Hospital in New Westminster after an extended illness.
