= Harry Jones (Canadian politician) =

Canadian politician

Member of the Legislative Assembly of British Columbia
- In office 1903–1909
- Constituency: Cariboo

Personal details
- Born: September 29, 1840 Bryn Engan, Llangybi, Carnarvon
- Died: February 23, 1936 (aged 95) Vancouver, British Columbia
- Party: British Columbia Liberal Party
- Occupation: prospector, miner

Harry Jones (September 29, 1840 – February 23, 1936) was a Welsh-born prospector and political figure in British Columbia. He represented Cariboo from 1903 to 1909 as a Liberal.

Born in Bryn Engan, Llangybi, Carnarvon in 1840, he arrived in British Columbia in June 1862, sailing by way of Cape Horn. Jones travelled on foot to the Cariboo country, settling at Lytton. He returned to Wales in 1876 and came back to North America in 1884. He again lived in the Cariboo region until ill health forced him to move to Vancouver in 1933. Jones was an unsuccessful candidate for a seat in the provincial assembly in 1900. He was elected in 1903 and reelected in 1907, but was defeated when he ran for reelection to the assembly in 1909. Jones died in 1936 at the Glen Hospital in Vancouver at the age of 95.
