= Thomas Keith (politician) =

Canadian politician

Thomas Keith (1863 – June 12, 1916) was an Irish-born miner and political figure in British Columbia. He represented Nanaimo City in the Legislative Assembly of British Columbia from 1890 to 1894.

He was born in Belfast. Keith ran as a Labour candidate in 1890, endorsed by the Miners' and Mine Labourers' Protective Association. He was defeated when he ran for reelection in 1894. He did not seek reelection again. In 1891, Keith introduced a motion in the assembly aimed at banning workers from China from working underground in British Columbia mines. In 1892, he introduced a bill that would ban underground workers from Japan. The proposed legislation was defeated. He died in Nanaimo at the age of 52.
