= West Kootenay-Nelson =

Defunct provincial electoral district in British Columbia, Canada

West Kootenay-Nelson was a provincial electoral district of British Columbia, Canada, from 1898 to 1903.

== Election results ==
Note: Winner of election is in bold.

9th British Columbia election, 1900
| Party | Candidate | Votes | % | ± | Expenditures |
|---|---|---|---|---|---|
| Conservative | Frank Fletcher | 508 | 32.82% | | unknown |
| Independent Liberal | George Arthur Benjamin Hall^{1} | 293 | 18.93% | | |
| Progressive | John Houston | 747 | 48.26% | | unknown |
| Conservative | **Samuel Augustus Rogers** | **289** | **29.82%** | | unknown |
| Total valid votes | | 1,548 | 100.00% | | |
^{1} Also listed as a Government supporter.

For the 1903 election this riding was renamed Nelson City.

== See also ==
- List of British Columbia provincial electoral districts
- Canadian provincial electoral districts
- List of electoral districts in the Kootenays
