= James Welton Horne =

Canadian politician

James Welton Horne (November 3, 1853 – February 21, 1922) was a land developer, businessman and political figure in British Columbia. He represented Vancouver City in the Legislative Assembly of British Columbia from 1890 until his retirement at the 1894 provincial election.

He was born in Toronto, the son of Christopher Horne and Elizabeth Harriet Orr, and was educated in Toronto, Whitby and Belleville. Horne began work with the Stathacona Fire Insurance Company and later went into business on his own as a financial, real estate and insurance broker. In 1878, he moved his office to Winnipeg. In 1881, Horne purchased land and established the city of Brandon, Manitoba on a railway junction. He was elected chairman of the board of public works for the new town. In 1885, he moved west to Coal Harbour. He invested money in downtown Mission, laid out the streets and advertised a "Great Land Sale" in 1891 to attract settlers to the area. Horne established the street railway in Vancouver, helped promote the development of the electric light company and played an important role in establishing a tramway between Vancouver and New Westminster. He served on Vancouver city council from 1888 to 1890 and also was chairman of the board of parks commissioners for six years. Horne established a zoo and turned it over to the city of Vancouver. He died in Vancouver at the age of 68.
