= Robert Hanley Hall =

Canadian politician

Robert Hanley Hall (25 April 1850 – 12 December 1924) was an Irish-born fur trader and political figure in British Columbia. He represented Cassiar in the Legislative Assembly of British Columbia from 1890 to 1894. He did not seek a second term in the Legislature in the 1894 provincial election.

He was born in Derry, the son of Reverend Thomas Hall. Hall began his career at Fenelon Falls, Ontario. He joined the Hudson's Bay Company in British Columbia in 1872 as a clerk. Hall was stationed in the New Caledonia District, at Fort Simpson, at Victoria and at Prince Albert. He was promoted to chief factor in 1906. Hall was president of the Board of Trade in Prince Albert for three years. He married Rachel Sarah, the daughter of Peter Skene Ogden, in 1876. Hall was named fur trade commissioner for the Hudson's Bay Company at Winnipeg in 1910. He retired from the Hudson's Bay Company in 1913 and retired to Prince Albert, where he died at the age of 74.
