= James Baker (Canadian politician) =

Canadian politician

- James Baker

Assembly Member for Kootenay
- In office 1886–1890

Assembly Member for East Kootenay
- In office 1890–1898

Assembly Member for East Kootenay South
- In office 1898–1900

James Baker (January 6, 1830 – July 31, 1906) was an English-born soldier and British Columbia political figure. He represented Kootenay from 1886 to 1890, East Kootenay from 1890 to 1898 and East Kootenay South from 1898 to 1900 in the Legislative Assembly of British Columbia.

He was born in London, the son of Samuel Baker, and was educated at the Collegiate School, Gloucester and at Cambridge University. In 1855, Baker married Sarah Louise White. He entered the Indian Navy in 1845, taking part in a survey of the Arabian coast and the suppression of the slave trade. Baker later joined the British Army and fought in the Crimea.

In 1858, he left the army as a very junior subaltern, and was admitted to Magdalene College, Cambridge, being awarded a BA in 1862 and MA in 1865. It was shortly before Baker's arrival in Cambridge that a decision was taken to form the University Rifle Volunteers and in 1860, Baker was appointed first commanding officer with the rank of major, being promoted to lieutenant-colonel later that year, and gazetted full colonel in 1906.

During this time, Baker was much involved with the suggestion of a "military degree", a scheme supported by the Prince Consort, but lost on his untimely death. Baker also devised a new plan for the mobilisation of the volunteer forces, having them concentrate on railway centres, and which was implemented in part.

Like many army officers of the day, Baker acted as a freelance, unpaid, intelligence gatherer, and Baker was author of the book Turkey in Europe as well has several confidential reports to the prime minister, Lord Beaconsfield. He was employed for a time as one of the private secretaries of the Duke of Westminster.

In 1885, he came with his family to British Columbia, settling first at Skookumchuck and later near the present site of Cranbrook. Baker was involved in plans to develop coal deposits in Crowsnest Pass area and later in plans to construct a railway connecting British Columbia and Alberta through the Pass. Eventually, he and his partners came to an agreement with the Canadian Pacific Railway. The choice of a route passing through Cranbrook and bypassing Fort Steele led to the development of Cranbrook as the major centre in the area. Baker served in the provincial cabinet as Provincial Secretary and Minister of Education, Immigration and Mines. In 1900, he retired to England. He died in Inglewood, Parkstone, Dorset at the age of 76.

Baker supported a head tax on the entry of Chinese and Japanese person into the province.

His brother Samuel was a British explorer, and another brother Valentine was a British soldier who served in Turkey. A third brother, John Garland Baker, was the first English tea planter in Ceylon. Overshadowed by his brothers, Baker's achievements are often overlooked.

Baker Street in Nelson and in Cranbrook were named after Colonel Baker.
