= Colin Campbell McKenzie =

Canadian politician

Colin Campbell McKenzie (March 25, 1836 – August 15, 1899) was an educator, real estate and insurance agent and political figure in British Columbia. After being an unsuccessful candidate in the 1886 provincial election and an 1887 byelection, he represented Nanaimo in the Legislative Assembly of British Columbia from 1890 to 1894. He did not seek a second term in the 1894 provincial election. He was Métis, and was likely the first Indigenous Member of British Columbia's Legislative Assembly.

He was born in Fort Vancouver, now part of Washington state, and was educated in Winnipeg and at St. Peter's College in Cambridge, England. In 1877, McKenzie married Mary Letitia Elford. He was principal of the Victoria Boy's Public School from 1872 to 1878 and Superintendent of Education for British Columbia from 1878 to 1884. McKenzie was endorsed by the Miners' and Mine Labourers' Protective Association as a farmers' candidate in 1890. He died in Nanaimo at the age of 63.
