= William Thomas Forster =

Canadian politician (1857–1938)

William Thomas Forster (baptised 30 August 1857 – 4 June 1938) was an English-born farmer and political figure in British Columbia, Canada. He represented Nanaimo from 1890 to 1894 and Westminster-Delta from 1894 until his defeat in the 1900 provincial election in the Legislative Assembly of British Columbia. His name also appears as Thomas William Forster and Thomas Forster.

He was born in Hexham, Northumberland and was educated there. Forster was speaker for the assembly from 1899 to 1900. He died at Glen Valley British Columbia in 1932, aged 80.
