= West Kootenay-Rossland =

Defunct provincial electoral district in British Columbia, Canada

West Kootenay-Rossland was a provincial electoral district of British Columbia, Canada, from 1898 to 1903.

== See also ==
- List of British Columbia provincial electoral districts
- Canadian provincial electoral districts
- List of electoral districts in the Kootenays
