= Joseph Mason (Canadian politician) =

Canadian politician

MLA for Cariboo
- In office January 24, 1887 – December 2, 1890
- Preceded by: George Cowan
- Succeeded by: Ithiel Nason

Personal details
- Born: 1839; Nottingham, United Kingdom
- Died: December 2, 1890; Barkerville, British Columbia
- Political party: Independent

Joseph Mason (1839 – December 2, 1890) was an English-born general merchant, miner and political figure in British Columbia. He represented Cariboo in the Legislative Assembly of British Columbia from 1887 to 1890.

He was born in Nottingham and was educated there. Mason sailed to Victoria by way of Cape Horn. He was involved in business there for four years and then travelled to Big Bend at the time of the gold rush in 1866. Mason settled in Barkerville. In 1882, he married Ada Skinner. He died in office in the Barkerville District at the age of 51, just a few months after winning a second term in the 1890 provincial election.
