= Thomas Edwin Kitchen =

Canadian politician

Thomas Edwin Kitchen (December 18, 1852 – April 5, 1897) was an English-born farmer and political figure in British Columbia. He represented Westminster from 1890 to 1894 and Westminster-Chilliwhack from 1894 to 1897 in the Legislative Assembly of British Columbia.

He was born near Lakeside, Lancashire, the son of Thomas Kitchen, and was educated at Wimbledon, Surrey. He came to the Fraser Valley during the 1880s. In 1882, Kitchen married Margaret C. Skovgaard. He served as reeve of Chilliwack. Kitchen died in office in Chilliwack at the age of 44 after an extended illness.
