= Samuel Augustus Rogers =

Canadian politician

Member of the Legislative Assembly of British Columbia
- In office 1890–1898
- Constituency: Cariboo
- In office 1900–1903
- Constituency: Cariboo

Personal details
- Born: February 1840 Ireland
- Died: June 4, 1911 (aged 71) Barkerville, British Columbia
- Party: Independent
- Occupation: merchant

Samuel Augustus Rogers (February 1840 – June 4, 1911) was an Irish-born merchant and political figure in British Columbia. He represented Cariboo from 1890 to 1898 and from 1900 to 1903 in the Legislative Assembly of British Columbia.

Born in 1840, he came with his parents to Ontario in 1844 and was educated in Prince Edward County. Rogers served as sheriff for Cariboo Lillooet District for four years. He was a director of the Cariboo Hospital. Rogers lived in Barkerville. He ran as a Conservative in the 1900 election. Rogers was defeated when he ran for reelection in 1898 and in 1903. He never sought provincial office again. He died at home in Barkerville in 1911.
