= Cariboo (provincial electoral district) =

Defunct provincial electoral district in British Columbia, Canada

British Columbia electoral district

Defunct provincial electoral district
- Legislature: Legislative Assembly of British Columbia
- First contested: 1871
- Last contested: 1986

Cariboo was one of the twelve original electoral districts created when British Columbia (B.C.) became a Canadian province in 1871. Roughly corresponding to the old colonial electoral administrative district of the same name, it was a three-member riding until the 1894 election, when it was reduced through re-apportionment and became a two-member riding. It became a single-member riding for the 1916 election, then briefly regained a second member of the Legislative Assembly (MLA) in 1986 before its abolishment in 1991.

It produced many notable MLAs, including George Anthony Boomer Walkem, third and fifth holder of the office of premier of British Columbia and one of the first representatives elected from the riding; John Robson, ninth premier of B.C.; and Robert Bonner, a powerful minister in the W. A. C. Bennett cabinet, and later CEO of MacMillan Bloedel and BC Hydro.

== Geography ==
When the riding was created, the bulk of its population was in the Cariboo goldfields district around Barkerville, although its boundaries extended to the Yukon boundaries — the original Cariboo riding at its creation included all of the former New Caledonia fur district, north of those parts of it now in the Lillooet Land District which formed the Lillooet riding.^{1} As mining exploration and other settlement spread northwards from the Cariboo mining areas, the Omineca, Fort George and Peace River ridings were split off by the end of the 19th century, and the Cariboo riding was reduced to the Cariboo Plateau, south from Quesnel to just south of Williams Lake and 150 Mile House, and including the Barkerville region as well as the remote Chilcotin region, which had no voting (settler) population when the riding was formed, other than isolated traders and trappers who may have had time or means to vote. Nearly all of the 785 voters in the first election were in the goldfield towns, Quesnel (then Quesnellemouthe), Williams Lake or towns and ranches south along the Cariboo Road and other routes of the era, and those along the West Fraser from the Chilcotin River, including the Gang Ranch south to just north of Big Bar, an isolated canyon ranching, river-crossing and wagon-trail town in the Fraser Canyon, which was in the Lillooet riding.

Following the construction of the Canadian Pacific Railway (CPR), increased settlement on the Cariboo Plateau south of the goldfields region shifted the population weight of the riding to that area, which was increasingly centred on the town of Williams Lake and the plateau between there and Kamloops. The southern Cariboo region, later added in a redistribution and division of the Cariboo riding into Cariboo South and Cariboo North, which exist today, was originally part of the Lillooet riding. The Lillooet and Cariboo provincial ridings combined formed the original definition of the Cariboo federal riding.

^{1} New Caledonia's southern boundary was vague, but it was generally accepted to include the Thompson area although its heartland is the Fort Saint James-Fraser Lake region northwest of Prince George.

== First Nations ==
When the riding was created its boundaries stretched from the Quesnel Lake and Chilcotin areas, flanking the great plateau of central BC on its east and west, all the way north to the Yukon border. At that time, although irrelevant to the issue of electoral representation, the riding's population included members of the Shuswap, Carrier, Chilcotin, Sekani and other more northerly nations. As the riding was reduced to roughly correspond with the Cariboo district (excluding Lillooet-Ashcroft, which were in the Lillooet electoral district, at least until the mid-20th century) the native population became only Shuswap, along the Fraser and east of it, and the Chilcotin people, who lived to the west of it. First Nations people, even in the reduced riding area, mostly outnumbered the total figure for non-natives until the early 20th century, but were not allowed to vote or run for office.

== Notable MLAs ==
- Alexander Edmund Batson Davie, became the eighth premier of British Columbia
- Alex Fraser, held the seat for 20 years

== Electoral history ==
Note: Winners of each election are in bold.

1st British Columbia general election, 1871
Party	Candidate	Votes	%	±	Expenditures
**Independent**	**Cornelius Booth**	**155**	**19.74%**		unknown
Independent	John Evans	107	13.63%		unknown
**Independent**	**Joseph Hunter**	**162**	**20.64%**		unknown
Independent	John Spencer Thompson	132	16.82%		unknown
**Independent**	**George Anthony Boomer Walkem ^{1}**	**229**	**29.17%**		unknown
Total valid votes		785	100.00%		
Total rejected ballots					
Turnout		%			
^{1}Premier 1874-1876

British Columbia provincial by-election, November 27, 1871
Party	Candidate	Votes
Independent	George Anthony Boomer Walkem	Acclaimed
The byelection was called due to Walkem's resignation upon appointment to the Executive Council (cabinet) on November. This byelection was one of a series held to confirm appointments to the Executive Council, which was the old parliamentary convention. As this byelection writ was filled by acclamation, no polling day was required and the seat was filled within two weeks. The stated date is the date the return of writs was received by the Chief Electoral Officer.

British Columbia byelection: Cariboo, June 22, 1872 ^{3}
Party	Candidate	Votes	%	±	Expenditures
Independent	Abraham Barlow	23	9.35%		unknown
**Independent**	**John George Barnston**	**132**	**53.66%**		unknown
Independent	Edward Pearson	91	36.99%		unknown
Total valid votes		n/a	-.- %		
Total rejected ballots					
Turnout		%			
^{3} Caused by resignation of C. Booth 23 April 1872 upon appointment as Clerk to the Bench at Kootenay 19 April 1872.

2nd British Columbia election, 1875
Party	Candidate	Votes	%	±	Expenditures
Opposition	**Alexander Edmund Batson Davie**	**199**	**23.36%**	–	unknown
Opposition	**John Evans**	**173**	**20.31%**	–	unknown
Government	Edward Pearson	117	13.73%	–	unknown
Government	John Johnston Robertson	68	7.98%	–	unknown
Government	**George Anthony Boomer Walkem ^{4}**	**254**	**29.81%**	–	unknown
Government	Samuel Walker	41	4.81%	–	unknown
Total valid votes		852	100.00%		
Total rejected ballots					
Turnout					
^{4} Incumbent Premier from 1874; term ended in 1876

3rd British Columbia election, 1878
Party	Candidate	Votes	%	±	Expenditures
Opposition	**George Cowan**	**238**	**30.20%**	–	unknown
Opposition	**John Evans**	**230**	**29.19%**	–	unknown
Government	Jonathan Nutt	68	8.63%	–	unknown
Opposition	**George Anthony Boomer Walkem ^{5}**	**252**	**31.98%**	–	unknown
Total valid votes		788	100.00%		
Total rejected ballots					
Turnout					
^{5} Elected Premier					

British Columbia byelection: Cariboo, August 3, 1878 ^{6}
Party	Candidate	Votes	%	±	Expenditures
Opposition	**George Anthony Boomer Walkem**	Acclaimed	-.- %	–	unknown
Total valid votes		n/a	-.- %		
Total rejected ballots					
Turnout		%			
^{6} Byelection caused by Walkem's resignation upon appointment to the Executive Council June. Date is that of return of writ, as a polling day was not necessary.

British Columbia byelection: Cariboo, October 29, 1879^{7}
Party	Candidate	Votes	%	±	Expenditures
Unknown	**George Ferguson**	**94**	**41.23%**		
Unknown	John Glasson	55	24.12%		
Unknown	Robert McLeese	79	34.65%		
Total valid votes		228			
^{7} Cause of byelection was the death of John Evans August.

4th British Columbia election, 1882
Party	Candidate	Votes	%	±	Expenditures
**Independent**	**George Cowan**	**217**	**24.46%**		unknown
Opposition	George Ferguson	117	13.19%	–	unknown
Opposition	Daniel McKay	82	9.25%	–	unknown
Government	**Robert McLeese**	**169**	**19.05%**	–	unknown
Opposition	Samuel Walker	107	12.06%	–	unknown
Opposition	**Charles Wilson**	**195**	**21.98%**	–	unknown
Total valid votes		887	100.00%		
Total rejected ballots					
Turnout		%			

5th British Columbia election, 1886
Party	Candidate	Votes	%	±	Expenditures
Opposition	Neil R. Campbell	39	5.17%	–	unknown
Government	**George Cowan**	**111**	**14.70%**	–	unknown
Opposition	George Ferguson	90	11.92%	–	unknown
Opposition	**Robert McLeese**	**113**	**14.97%**	–	unknown
Government	**Joseph Mason**	**125**	**16.56%**	–	unknown
Opposition	Denis Murphy	88	11.65%	–	unknown
Opposition	Robert Lauderdale Shaw	38	5.03%	–	unknown
Independent	Samuel Walker	61	8.08%		unknown
Government	Charles Wilson	90	11.92%	–	unknown
Total valid votes		755	100.00%		
Total rejected ballots					
Turnout		%			

6th British Columbia election, 1890
Party	Candidate	Votes	%	±	Expenditures
Government	**Joseph Mason**	**187**	**29.13%**	–	unknown
Government	**John Robson ^{8}**	**158**	**24.61%**	–	unknown
Opposition	**Samuel Augustus Rogers**	**163**	**25.39%**	–	unknown
Opposition	William Pinchbeck	134	20.87%	–	unknown
Total valid votes		642	100.00%		
Total rejected ballots					
Turnout		%			
^{8} Incumbent Premier since 1889; term ended in 1892

7th British Columbia election, 1894
Party	Candidate	Votes	%	±	Expenditures
Government	**William Adams**	**147**	**21.33%**	–	unknown
Opposition	John Charlton Kinchant	95	13.79%	–	unknown
Opposition	Robert McLeese	142	20.61%	–	unknown
Government	**Samuel Augustus Rogers**	**167**	**24.24%**	–	unknown
Government	Hugh Watt	138	20.03%	–	unknown
Total valid votes		689	100.00%		
Total rejected ballots					
Turnout		%			

8th British Columbia election, 1898
Party	Candidate	Votes	%	±	Expenditures
Opposition	**Hans Lars Helgesen**	**218**	**28.76%**	–	unknown
Government	Joseph Hunter	173	22.82%	–	unknown
Opposition	**John Charlton Kinchant**	**195**	**25.73%**	–	unknown
Government	Samuel Augustus Rogers	172	22.69%	–	unknown
Total valid votes		758	100.00%		
Total rejected ballots					
Turnout		%			

1900 British Columbia general election
Party	Candidate	Votes	%	Elected
Conservative	Joseph Hunter	302	31.17	✓
Conservative	Samuel Augustus Rogers	289	29.82	✓
Progressive	Harry Jones	201	20.74	
Progressive	John Charlton Kinchant	177	18.27	
Total valid votes		969		

10th British Columbia election, 1903
Party	Candidate	Votes	%	±	Expenditures
Conservative	William Adams	411	23.76%		unknown
**Liberal**	**Harry Jones**	**439**	**25.37%**		unknown
**Liberal**	**James Murphy**	**501**	**28.96%**		unknown
Conservative	Samuel Augustus Rogers	379	21.91%		unknown
Total valid votes		1,730	100.00%		
Total rejected ballots					
Turnout		%			

11th British Columbia election, 1907
Party	Candidate	Votes	%	±	Expenditures
Conservative	Leon Frederick James Champion	135	20.64%		unknown
**Liberal**	**Harry Jones**	**184**	**28.14%**		unknown
Conservative	Charles Wilson	152	23.34%		unknown
**Liberal**	**John McKay Yorston**	**183**	**27.98%**		unknown
Total valid votes		654	100.00%		
Total rejected ballots					
Turnout		%			

12th British Columbia election, 1909
Party	Candidate	Votes	%	±	Expenditures
**Conservative**	**Michael Callanan**	**273**	**31.86%**		unknown
**Conservative**	**John Anderson Fraser**	**267**	**31.15%**		unknown
Liberal	Harry Jones	159	18.55%	–	unknown
Liberal	John McKay Yorston	158	18.54%	–	unknown
Total valid votes		857	100.00%		
Total rejected ballots					
Turnout		%			

13th British Columbia election, 1912
Party	Candidate	Votes	%	±	Expenditures
**Conservative**	**Michael Callanan**	**310**	**37.48%**		unknown
**Conservative**	**John Anderson Fraser**	**335**	**40.51%**		unknown
Liberal	John Holt	182	22.01%	–	unknown
Total valid votes		827	100.00%		
Total rejected ballots					
Turnout		%			

14th British Columbia election, 1916
Party	Candidate	Votes	%	±	Expenditures
Conservative	John Anderson Fraser	207	31.36%		unknown
**Liberal**	**John McKay Yorston**	**453**	**68.64%**		unknown
Total valid votes		660	100.00%		
Total rejected ballots					
Turnout		%			

15th British Columbia election, 1920
Party	Candidate	Votes	%	±	Expenditures
Conservative	John Anderson Fraser	349	38.35%		unknown
**Liberal**	**John McKay Yorston**	**561**	**61.65%**		unknown
Total valid votes		910	100.00%		
Total rejected ballots					
Turnout		%			

16th British Columbia election, 1924
Party	Candidate	Votes	%	±	Expenditures
Conservative	John Anderson Fraser	397	30.44%		unknown
Provincial	**David Alexander Stoddart**	**561**	**61.65%**	–	unknown
Liberal	John McKay Yorston	414	31.75%	–	unknown
Total valid votes		1,304	100.00%		
Total rejected ballots					
Turnout		%			

17th British Columbia election, 1928
Party	Candidate	Votes	%	±	Expenditures
Liberal	Robert Neil Campbell	400	28.25%	–	unknown
**Conservative**	**Roderick Mackenzie**	**623**	**44.00%**		unknown
Independent	David Alexander Stoddart	393	27.75%		unknown
Total valid votes		1,416	100.00%		
Total rejected ballots		157			
Turnout		%			

18th British Columbia election, 1933
Party	Candidate	Votes	%	±	Expenditures
Co-operative Commonwealth Fed.	Rupert Williams Haggen	398	19.92%		unknown
**Liberal**	**Donald Morrison MacKay**	**1,089**	**54.50%**		unknown
Non-Partisan Independent Group	Roderick Mackenzie	511	25.58%	–	unknown
Total valid votes		1,998	100.00%		
Total rejected ballots		38			
Turnout		%			

19th British Columbia election, 1937
Party	Candidate	Votes	%	±	Expenditures
Independent	Jennie E. Clarke	655	25.43%		unknown
**Liberal**	**Louis LeBourdais**	**1,921**	**74.57%**		unknown
Total valid votes		2,578	100.00%		
Total rejected ballots		62			
Turnout		%			

20th British Columbia election, 1941
Party	Candidate	Votes	%	±	Expenditures
Co-operative Commonwealth Fed.	Richmond Charles Biss	338	11.86%		unknown
Independent	Truman Charles Docherty	404	14.18%		unknown
Independent	John Hargreaves	257	9.02%		unknown
**Liberal**	**Louis LeBourdais**	**1,429**	**50.16%**		unknown
Conservative	Christy McDevitt	257	9.02%		unknown
Total valid votes		2,849	100.00%		
Total rejected ballots		92			
Turnout		%			

21st British Columbia election, 1945
Party	Candidate	Votes	%	±	Expenditures
Coalition	**Louis LeBourdais**	**1,370**	**57.93%**	–	unknown
Co-operative Commonwealth Fed.	Charles Archibald Thomas	995	42.07%		unknown
Total valid votes		2,365	100.00%		
Total rejected ballots		67			
Turnout		%			

22nd British Columbia election, 1949
Party	Candidate	Votes	%	±	Expenditures
Co-operative Commonwealth	Nicholas Charles Bird	1,314	33.12%		unknown
Coalition	**Angus MacLean**	**2,653**	**66.88%**	–	unknown
Total valid votes		3,967	100.00%		
Total rejected ballots		110			
Turnout		%			

23rd British Columbia election, 1952^{9}
Party	Candidate	Votes 1st count	%	Votes final count	%	±%	
Social Credit League	**William Ralph Talbot Chetwynd**	**2,684**	**51.84%**	**2,684**	**51.84%**		
Liberal	Angus McLean	1,029	19.88%	1,029	19.88%		unknown
Co-operative Commonwealth Fed.	Roland Riley	689	13.31%	689	13.31%		unknown
Progressive Conservative	Kenneth Winston Thibaudeau	775	14.97%	775	14.97%		unknown
Total valid votes		5,177	%	5,177	100.00%		
Total rejected ballots		216					
Turnout		77.94%					
^{9} Preferential ballot; only one count necessary due to majority on first count

24th British Columbia election, 1953 ^{10}
Party	Candidate	Votes 1st count	%	Votes final count	%	±%	
Progressive Conservative	Jack Gardner Boultbee	509	9.63%	509	9.63%		unknown
Social Credit League	**William Ralph Talbot Chetwynd**	**2,733**	**51.73%**	**2,733**	**51.73%**		
Liberal	Gideon Earl Malcolm	1,050	19.87%	1,050	19.87%		unknown
Co-operative Commonwealth Fed.	Joseph Wilson McConnell	992	18.77%	992	18.77%		unknown
Total valid votes		5,284	100.00%	5,284	%		
Total rejected ballots		288					
Total Registered Voters							
Turnout		%					
^{10} Preferential ballot; only one count shown due to majority on first count

25th British Columbia election, 1956
Party	Candidate	Votes	%	±	Expenditures
Social Credit	**William Ralph Talbot Chetwynd**	**3,014**	**60.86**	–	unknown
Liberal	Felix Rudolph Kohnke	1,141	23.04%	–	unknown
Co-operative Commonwealth Fed.	James Lehman	797	16.09%		unknown
Total valid votes		4,952	100.00%		
Total rejected ballots		45			
Turnout		%			

British Columbia provincial by-election, September 9, 1957 Death of Ralph Chetwynd
Party	Candidate	Votes	%
Social Credit	**William Collins Speare**	2,294	49.25
Liberal	Felix Rudolph Kohnke	1,102	23.66
Progressive Conservative	John James Roddis	638	13.70
Co-operative Commonwealth	John Wasyliw	624	13.40
Total valid votes		4,658	
Total rejected ballots		28	
Source: Elections BC

26th British Columbia election, 1960
Party	Candidate	Votes	%	±	Expenditures
Co-operative Commonwealth Fed.	Stanley Doubleday Crowe	1,842	24.37%		unknown
Liberal	Felix Rudolph Kohnke	2,073	27.43%	–	unknown
Social Credit	**William Collins Speare**	**3,091**	**40.90%**	–	unknown
Progressive Conservative	Celian Orvian Tingley	552	7.30%		unknown
Total valid votes		7,558	100.00%		
Total rejected ballots		112			
Turnout		%			

27th British Columbia election, 1963
Party	Candidate	Votes	%	±	Expenditures
Progressive Conservative	John Alfred Vernon Cade	1,551	21.60%		unknown
New Democratic	Stanley Doubleday Crowe	1,482	20.63%		unknown
Liberal	Felix Rudolph Kohnke	1,134	15.79%	–	unknown
Social Credit	**William Collins Speare**	**3,015**	**41.98%**	–	unknown
Total valid votes		7,182	100.00%		
Total rejected ballots		49			
Turnout		%			

28th British Columbia election, 1966
Party	Candidate	Votes	%	±	Expenditures
New Democratic	Hartley Douglas Dent	2,530	35.74%		unknown
Liberal	Ronald Charles MacKay	719	10.16%	–	unknown
Social Credit	**William Collins Speare**	**3,830**	**54.10%**	–	unknown
Total valid votes		7,079	100.00%		
Total rejected ballots		74			
Turnout		%			

British Columbia provincial by-election, November 28, 1966 Resignation of William C. Speare
Party	Candidate	Votes	%
Social Credit	**Robert William Bonner**	4,189	46.78
New Democratic	Hartley Douglas Dent	3,537	39.50
Liberal	Herbert Lee Skipp	1,144	12.77
Free Trade Party	Gerard Goeujon	62	0.69
Independent	Richard Mullins	23	0.26
Total valid votes		8,955	
Total rejected ballots		47	
Source: Elections BC

29th British Columbia election, 1969
Party	Candidate	Votes	%	±	Expenditures
Social Credit	**Alex Fraser**	**5,766**	**52.05%**	–	unknown
New Democratic	Kirby Gerald Seabrook	2,961	26.73%		unknown
Liberal	David Zirnhelt	2,351	21.22%	–	unknown
Total valid votes		11,078	100.00%		
Total rejected ballots		85			
Turnout		%			

30th British Columbia election, 1972
Party	Candidate	Votes	%	±	Expenditures
New Democratic	Ronald Hjalmar Anderson	5,435	38.68%		unknown
Social Credit	**Alex Fraser**	**6,780**	**48.25%**	–	unknown
Liberal	Lawrence Albert Gladue	1,837	13.07%	–	unknown
Total valid votes		14,052	100.00%		
Total rejected ballots		220			
Turnout		%			

31st British Columbia election, 1975
Party	Candidate	Votes	%	±	Expenditures
New Democratic	Grethyl Verda Adams	6,122	30.13%		unknown
Social Credit	**Alex Fraser**	**14,194**	**69.87%**	–	unknown
Total valid votes		20,316	100.00%		
Total rejected ballots		235			
Turnout		%			

32nd British Columbia election, 1979
Party	Candidate	Votes	%	±	Expenditures
Social Credit	**Alex Fraser**	**13,736**	**64.09%**	–	unknown
New Democratic	Byron Ralph Kemp	7,233	33.75%		unknown
Independent	Brian Hartley Mayne	462	2.16%		unknown
Total valid votes		21,431	100.00%		
Total rejected ballots		315			
Turnout		%			

33rd British Columbia election, 1983
Party	Candidate	Votes	%	±	Expenditures
Social Credit	**Alex Fraser**	**16,446**	**61.82%**	–	unknown
New Democratic	Steven Edward Hilbert	8,990	33.80%		unknown
Green	Jeremie Louis LeBourdais ^{11}	212	0.80%	–	unknown
Western Canada Concept	Harold Alexander Paley	405	1.52%		unknown
Liberal	Quintin Robert McAdam Robertson	549	2.06%	–	unknown
Total valid votes		26,602	100.00%		
Total rejected ballots		393			
Turnout		%			
^{11} Son of former MLA Louis Lebourdais

34th British Columbia election, 1986 ^{12}
Party	Candidate	Votes	%	±	Expenditures
Liberal	Michael George D'Arcy	1,738	3.61%	–	unknown
New Democratic	John Dressler	8,386	17.41%		unknown
Progressive Conservative	Peter V. Epp	555	1.15%		unknown
Social Credit	**Alex Fraser**	**14,954**	**30.312%**	–	unknown
Independent	Jeremie Louis LeBourdais	214	0.44%		unknown
New Democratic	Christine M. Slater	8,250	17.13%		unknown
Social Credit	**T. Neil Vant**	**12,715**	**26.40%**	–	unknown
Liberal	Sylvia Anne Louise Warn	927	1.93%	–	unknown
Progressive Conservative	Charles Richard Wyse	778	1.62%		unknown
Total valid votes		48,157	100.00%		
Total rejected ballots		778			
Turnout		%			
^{12} Seat increased to two members from one.

== See also ==
- List of British Columbia provincial electoral districts
- Canadian provincial electoral districts
