= Dosanjh ministry =

Cabinet of British Columbia, 2000–2001

- 33rd ministry of British Columbia

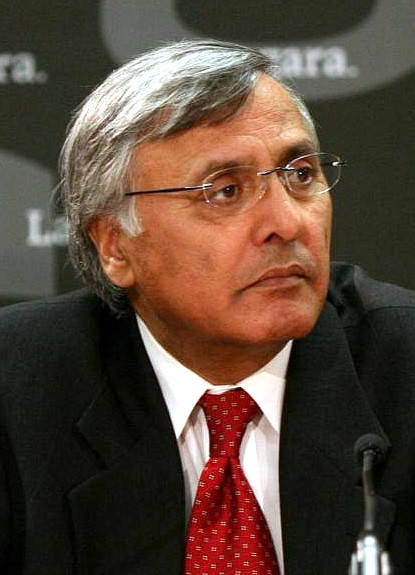
- Ujjal Dosanjh in 2011
- Date formed: February 24, 2000
- Date dissolved: June 5, 2001

People and organisations
- Monarch: Elizabeth II
- Lieutenant Governor: Garde Gardom
- Premier: Ujjal Dosanjh
- Deputy Premier: Joy MacPhail
- Member party: New Democratic Party
- Status in legislature: Majority
- Opposition party: Liberal Party
- Opposition leader: Gordon Campbell

History
- Legislature term: 36th Parliament of British Columbia
- Incoming formation: 2000 NDP leadership election
- Outgoing formation: 2001 general election
- Predecessor: Miller ministry
- Successor: Campbell ministry

The Dosanjh ministry was the combined Cabinet (formally the Executive Council of British Columbia) that governed British Columbia from February 24, 2000, to June 5, 2001. It was led by Ujjal Dosanjh, the 33rd premier of British Columbia, and consisted of members of the New Democratic Party (NDP).

The Dosanjh ministry was in office for the last fourteen months of the 36th Parliament of British Columbia. It was the third ministry to exist during that parliament, following the Glen Clark ministry (1996–1999) and the Miller ministry (1999–2000). Dosanjh was sworn in as premier on February 24, 2000, with his initial cabinet following five days later.

Following the 2001 election, which the NDP lost, it was replaced by the Campbell ministry.

== List of ministers ==
Dosanjh ministry by portfolio
Portfolio	Minister	Tenure	
Portfolio	Minister	Start	End
Premier of British Columbia	Ujjal Dosanjh	February 24, 2000	June 5, 2001
Deputy Premier of British Columbia	Joy MacPhail	February 29, 2000	June 5, 2001
Minister of Aboriginal Affairs	Dale Lovick	February 29, 2000	November 1, 2000
Minister of Aboriginal Affairs	David Zirnhelt	November 1, 2000	June 5, 2001
Minister of Advanced Education, Training and Technology	Graeme Bowbrick	February 29, 2000	November 1, 2000
Minister of Advanced Education, Training and Technology	Cathy McGregor	November 1, 2000	June 5, 2001
Minister of Agriculture, Food and Fisheries	Corky Evans	February 29, 2000	November 1, 2000
Minister of Agriculture, Food and Fisheries	Ed Conroy	November 1, 2000	June 5, 2001
Attorney General	Andrew Petter	February 29, 2000	November 1, 2000
Attorney General	Graeme Bowbrick	November 1, 2000	June 5, 2001
Minister of Children and Families	Gretchen Brewin	February 29, 2000	November 1, 2000
Minister of Children and Families	Edward John	November 1, 2000	June 5, 2001
Minister of Community Development, Cooperatives and Volunteers	Jenny Kwan	February 29, 2000	June 5, 2001
Minister of Education	Penny Priddy	February 29, 2000	November 1, 2000
Minister of Education	Joy MacPhail	November 1, 2000	June 5, 2001
Minister of Employment and Investment	Gordon Wilson	February 29, 2000	November 1, 2000
Minister of Employment and Investment	Tim Stevenson	November 1, 2000	June 5, 2001
Minister of Energy and Mines	Dan Miller	February 29, 2000	November 1, 2000
Minister of Energy and Mines	Glenn Robertson	November 1, 2000	June 5, 2001
Minister of Environment, Land and Parks	Joan Sawicki	February 29, 2000	November 1, 2000
Minister of Environment, Land and Parks	Ian Waddell	November 1, 2000	June 5, 2001
Minister of Finance and Corporate Relations	Paul Ramsey	February 29, 2000	June 5, 2001
Minister of Forests	Jim Doyle	February 29, 2000	November 1, 2000
Minister of Forests	Gordon Wilson	November 1, 2000	June 5, 2001
Minister of Health	Mike Farnworth	February 29, 2000	November 1, 2000
Minister of Health	Corky Evans	November 1, 2000	June 5, 2001
Minister responsible for Human Rights	Andrew Petter	February 29, 2000	November 1, 2000
Minister of Human Rights	Graeme Bowbrick	November 1, 2000	June 5, 2001
Minister of Labour	Joy MacPhail	February 29, 2000	November 1, 2000
Minister of Labour	Joan Smallwood	November 1, 2000	June 5, 2001
Minister of Multiculturalism and Immigration	Sue Hammell	February 29, 2000	June 5, 2001
Minister of Municipal Affairs	Cathy McGregor	February 29, 2000	November 1, 2000
Minister of Municipal Affairs	Jim Doyle	November 1, 2000	June 5, 2001
Minister responsible for Northern Development	Dan Miller	February 29, 2000	November 1, 2000
Minister responsible for Northern Development	Paul Ramsey	November 1, 2000	June 5, 2001
Minister responsible for the Public Service	Sue Hammell	February 29, 2000	June 5, 2001
Minister responsible for Rural Development	Corky Evans	February 29, 2000	November 1, 2000
Minister responsible for Rural Development	Ed Conroy	November 1, 2000	June 5, 2001
Minister responsible for Seniors	Mike Farnworth	February 29, 2000	November 1, 2000
Minister responsible for Seniors	Corky Evans	November 1, 2000	June 5, 2001
Minister of Tourism, Small Business and Culture	Ian Waddell	February 29, 2000	November 1, 2000
Minister of Tourism, Small Business and Culture	Gerard Janssen	November 1, 2000	June 5, 2001
Minister of Social Development and Economic Security	Jan Pullinger	February 29, 2000	November 1, 2000
Minister of Social Development and Economic Security	Mike Farnworth	November 1, 2000	June 5, 2001
Minister of Transportation and Highways	Harry Lali	February 29, 2000	February 15, 2001
Minister of Transportation and Highways	Helmut Giesbrecht	February 15, 2001	June 5, 2001
Minister of Women's Equality	Joan Smallwood	February 29, 2000	November 1, 2000
Minister of Women's Equality	Evelyn Gillespie	November 1, 2000	June 5, 2001
Minister responsible for Youth	Graeme Bowbrick	February 29, 2000	November 1, 2000
Minister of Youth	Cathy McGregor	November 1, 2000	June 5, 2001

Dosanjh ministry by minister
Portfolio	Minister	Tenure	
Portfolio	Minister	Start	End
Ujjal Dosanjh	Premier of British Columbia	February 24, 2000	June 5, 2001
Graeme Bowbrick	Minister of Advanced Education, Training and Technology	February 29, 2000	November 1, 2000
Graeme Bowbrick	Minister responsible for Youth	February 29, 2000	November 1, 2000
Graeme Bowbrick	Attorney General	November 1, 2000	June 5, 2001
Graeme Bowbrick	Minister of Human Rights	November 1, 2000	June 5, 2001
Gretchen Brewin	Minister of Children and Families	February 29, 2000	November 1, 2000
Ed Conroy	Minister of Agriculture, Food and Fisheries	November 1, 2000	June 5, 2001
Ed Conroy	Minister responsible for Rural Development	November 1, 2000	June 5, 2001
Jim Doyle	Minister of Forests	February 29, 2000	November 1, 2000
Jim Doyle	Minister of Municipal Affairs	November 1, 2000	June 5, 2001
Corky Evans	Minister of Agriculture, Food and Fisheries	February 29, 2000	November 1, 2000
Corky Evans	Minister responsible for Rural Development	February 29, 2000	November 1, 2000
Corky Evans	Minister of Health	November 1, 2000	June 5, 2001
Corky Evans	Minister responsible for Seniors	November 1, 2000	June 5, 2001
Mike Farnworth	Minister of Health	February 29, 2000	November 1, 2000
Mike Farnworth	Minister responsible for Seniors	February 29, 2000	November 1, 2000
Mike Farnworth	Minister of Social Development and Economic Security	November 1, 2000	June 5, 2001
Helmut Giesbrecht	Minister of Transportation and Highways	February 15, 2001	June 5, 2001
Evelyn Gillespie	Minister of Women's Equality	November 1, 2000	June 5, 2001
Sue Hammell	Minister of Multiculturalism and Immigration	February 29, 2000	June 5, 2001
Sue Hammell	Minister responsible for the Public Service	February 29, 2000	June 5, 2001
Gerard Janssen	Minister of Tourism, Small Business and Culture	November 1, 2000	June 5, 2001
Edward John	Minister of Children and Families	November 1, 2000	June 5, 2001
Jenny Kwan	Minister of Community Development, Cooperatives and Volunteers	February 29, 2000	June 5, 2001
Harry Lali	Minister of Transportation and Highways	February 29, 2000	February 15, 2001
Dale Lovick	Minister of Aboriginal Affairs	February 29, 2000	November 1, 2000
Joy MacPhail	Deputy Premier of British Columbia	February 29, 2000	June 5, 2001
Joy MacPhail	Minister of Labour	February 29, 2000	November 1, 2000
Joy MacPhail	Minister of Education	November 1, 2000	June 5, 2001
Cathy McGregor	Minister of Municipal Affairs	February 29, 2000	November 1, 2000
Cathy McGregor	Minister of Advanced Education, Training and Technology	November 1, 2000	June 5, 2001
Cathy McGregor	Minister of Youth	November 1, 2000	June 5, 2001
Dan Miller	Minister of Energy and Mines	February 29, 2000	November 1, 2000
Dan Miller	Minister responsible for Northern Development	February 29, 2000	November 1, 2000
Andrew Petter	Attorney General	February 29, 2000	November 1, 2000
Andrew Petter	Minister responsible for Human Rights	February 29, 2000	November 1, 2000
Penny Priddy	Minister of Education	February 29, 2000	November 1, 2000
Jan Pullinger	Minister of Social Development and Economic Security	February 29, 2000	November 1, 2000
Paul Ramsey	Minister of Finance and Corporate Relations	February 29, 2000	June 5, 2001
Paul Ramsey	Minister responsible for Northern Development	November 1, 2000	June 5, 2001
Glenn Robertson	Minister of Energy and Mines	November 1, 2000	June 5, 2001
Joan Sawicki	Minister of Environment, Land and Parks	February 29, 2000	November 1, 2000
Joan Smallwood	Minister of Women's Equality	February 29, 2000	November 1, 2000
Joan Smallwood	Minister of Labour	November 1, 2000	June 5, 2001
Tim Stevenson	Minister of Employment and Investment	November 1, 2000	June 5, 2001
Ian Waddell	Minister of Tourism, Small Business and Culture	February 29, 2000	November 1, 2000
Ian Waddell	Minister of Environment, Land and Parks	November 1, 2000	June 5, 2001
Gordon Wilson	Minister of Employment and Investment	February 29, 2000	November 1, 2000
Gordon Wilson	Minister of Forests	November 1, 2000	June 5, 2001
David Zirnhelt	Minister of Aboriginal Affairs	November 1, 2000	June 5, 2001

== Cabinet shuffles ==
Dosanjh shuffled his cabinet on November 1, 2000. The shuffle was undertaken to replace seven cabinet ministers who had decided not run in the impending election. In a surprise move, Dosanjh named Edward John, the Grand Chief of the First Nations Summit of British Columbia and not an MLA, to cabinet. John was the second indigenous cabinet minister in BC, after Frank Calder in the 1970s.
