= Moe Sihota =

Canadian politician and broadcaster

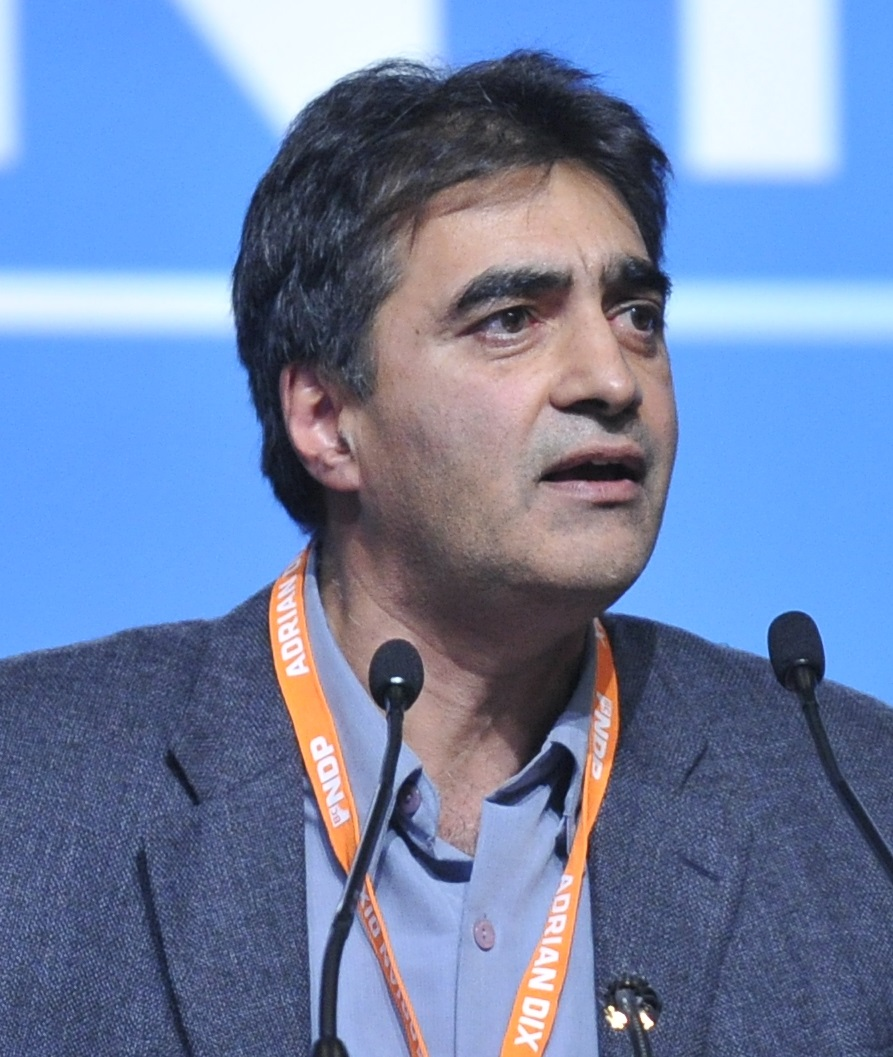

President of the British Columbia New Democratic Party
- In office November 29, 2009 – November 17, 2013
- Preceded by: Sav Dhaliwal
- Succeeded by: Craig Keating

Member of the British Columbia Legislative Assembly for Esquimalt-Metchosin Esquimalt-Port Renfrew (1986-1991)
- In office October 22, 1986 – May 16, 2001
- Preceded by: Frank Mitchell
- Succeeded by: Arnie Hamilton

Personal details
- Born: Munmohan Singh Sihota; February 18, 1955 (age 71) Duncan, British Columbia, Canada
- Party: New Democrat
- Spouse: Jessie Sihota (m. 1985)
- Education: University of British Columbia; University of Victoria
- Profession: lawyer

Munmohan Singh "Moe" Sihota (born February 18, 1955) is a Canadian politician, broadcaster and lawyer. He served as a member of the Legislative Assembly of British Columbia (MLA), representing Esquimalt-Port Renfrew from 1986 to 1991, and Esquimalt-Metchosin from 1991 to 2001; he was the first Canadian of South Asian and Indian descent to be elected to provincial parliament. A member of the British Columbia New Democratic Party (BC NDP), he was a cabinet minister under premiers Mike Harcourt, Glen Clark and Dan Miller, and served as party president from 2009 to 2013.

== Early life and education ==
Born in Duncan, British Columbia, he attended St. George's Boys School in Vancouver on scholarship. He earned a bachelor's degree in social work from the University of British Columbia (UBC) in 1977, and was a social worker in White Rock from 1978 to 1979. He was awarded a scholarship to Warwick School of Economics in 1981, and earned a law degree from the University of Victoria, then began practising law in Esquimalt in 1984.

He married his wife Jessie in 1985. They have two children together, Rajan and Karina.

== Political career ==
His political career began during his undergraduate years, serving as external affairs officer for the UBC student society, the Alma Mater Society, as well as serving as an elected student representative on the UBC Board of Governors. After graduating from UBC, he became president of the Young New Democrats, and served as president of Cowichan—Malahat—The Islands Federal NDP. He was also the campaign manager for Frank Mitchell and Jim Manly, who were re-elected to the Legislative Assembly of British Columbia in 1983 and the House of Commons of Canada in 1984 respectively. Sihota was elected as an alderman for Esquimalt in 1984.

In the 1986 provincial election, Sihota ran as the BC NDP candidate in the riding of Esquimalt-Port Renfrew to replace the retiring Mitchell. He held the seat easily, and became the first Indo-Canadian to be elected to any federal or provincial riding. He served as the NDP's labour critic in the 34th Parliament.

In 1991, Sihota ran for and won re-election in the new riding of Esquimalt-Metchosin as part of an NDP landslide victory. Subsequently, he was named to Premier Mike Harcourt's cabinet as Minister of Labour and Consumer Services, and Minister Responsible for Constitutional Affairs, becoming the first Indo-Canadian cabinet minister in a province of Canada. He was re-assigned as Minister of the Environment, Lands and Parks, and Minister Responsible for Multiculturalism and Human Rights in September 1993, serving in those roles until his resignation in May 1995.

He was re-instated to the environment portfolio in August 1995, then became Minister of Education, Skills and Training and Minister of Labour in the Glen Clark cabinet following his re-election in 1996. He once again resigned his cabinet posts in December 1996, then returned to cabinet as Minister Responsible for Public Service in October 1998, before becoming Minister of Social Development and Economic Security in July 1999.

Following Clark's resignation as premier and NDP leader in August 1999, Sihota retained his post in Dan Miller's cabinet. He considered running in the leadership election, but pulled out by December 1999. Ujjal Dosanjh was elected NDP leader in February 2000, and did not name Sihota to any cabinet position.

During his time in government, he created 200 new provincial parks, extended workers' compensation coverage to farm workers, and changed BC logging practices. He also served as Minister Responsible for BC Hydro, Minister Responsible for the Insurance Corporation of British Columbia, and Government House Leader.

== Controversy ==
=== BC Hydro appointment ===
Sihota helped his friend and former Vancouver MP Herb Dhaliwal become appointed to the board of B.C. Hydro in 1991, after Dhaliwal provided Sihota with a substantial mortgage guarantee. The opposition BC Liberals then requested an investigation by Conflict Commissioner Ted Hughes. Hughes later found that Sihota had not been in a conflict of interest. However, Hughes also said at the time of the finding that had the new laws been in place during Dhaliwal's appointment in 1991, Sihota would have been found to be in a conflict of interest.

=== BC Law Society misconduct ===
Sihota resigned from cabinet in May 1995 after the Law Society of British Columbia found him guilty of professional misconduct and suspended his licence to practice for 18 months; he was reinstated to cabinet that August. In his memoirs, "A Measure of Defiance", former BC Premier Mike Harcourt commented that "Although the B.C. Law Society denied the allegation, the hint that the investigation of our outspoken environment minister was politically motivated was too strong to be dismissed that quickly. There was no public outcry over the incident and to most of his constituents, reporters and even political adversaries, Moe's credibility did not suffer seriously."

=== Limousine licences ===
In 1996 Dhaliwal had applied to the Motor Carrier Commission for several licences related to a limousine company partly owned by Dhaliwal and run by Sihota's cousin. It was later revealed by the former Commission chairman that Sihota had made repeated calls and wrote several letters to the commission in relation to Dhaliwal's applications. Sihota again resigned from cabinet in December 1996. A new investigation was started not by the Conflict of Interest Commissioner, but by fellow NDP party member and Glen Clark deputy minister Doug McArthur. Although McArthur found that Sihota had "exercised poor judgment and bullied commission staff", he found that Sihota had not been in a conflict of interest. Glen Clark then reappointed Sihota back to cabinet in 1998.

== Post-MLA career ==
With the NDP behind in polls, Sihota announced in March 2001 that he would not run again in that May's provincial election. After finishing his term as MLA, he joined CIVI-TV (formerly The New VI, now CTV 2), a television station in Victoria which went on air in October 2001. He initially co-anchored the station's early evening newscast, then became the host for phone-in show VILand Voices before being let go in 2004 as part of station restructuring. Since then he had provided political commentary for CBC Radio's Early Edition political panel.

Since 2004, Sihota has pursued several business opportunities and is currently a part-owner and director of the Northern Bear Golf Club (Edmonton, AB), Four Points Sheraton (Victoria, BC) and Walton's Lakefront Resort (Osoyoos, BC).

In 2012, Vancouver Magazine named Sihota as one of B.C's 50 most influential citizens.

In 2012, Sihota received the Queen's Diamond Jubilee Medal for contributions to Canadian society.

In 2005, the Parvasi Awards were created to honour outstanding achievements by Canadian Punjabis. Sihota was the recipient of the 2015 Lifetime Achievement Award in recognition of being the first Indo-Canadian elected to a Canadian legislature and the first Indo-Canadian ever to be appointed to a cabinet.

The 100 Year Journey Project chronicles the stories of the first 100 South Asians that impacted Canadian society, chartered new territories and broke new ground. Sihota received the 2015 Pioneers and Navigators Award for his work in politics and public policy.

After the 2015 election of the New Democratic government in Alberta, Sihota joined Edmonton's Canadian Strategy Group as a strategic counsel to provide political and policy advice to Alberta corporations, trade unions and non-profits.

=== BC NDP president ===
In November 2009, Sihota was elected to the position of president of the BC New Democratic Party. In October 2010, the media revealed that Sihota was being paid a salary for his position as president, with payments from the Canadian Union of Public Employees, United Steelworkers, and the British Columbia Federation of Labour. Sihota was elected to a second term at the 2011 party convention.

Sihota, along with party leader Adrian Dix, faced criticism for running a poor campaign following the NDP's unexpected defeat in the 2013 provincial election. On September 21, 2013, the day after Dix announced his intention to step down as leader, Sihota announced that he would be stepping down as party president at the end of his term in November 2013. He was credited with modernizing the NDP's fundraising capacity and implementing outreach to the business community during his term.

British Columbia provincial government of Dan Miller
Cabinet post (1)
Predecessor	Office	Successor
cont'd from Clark Ministry	Minister of Social Development and Economic Security; August 25, 1999–February 24, 2000	Jan Pullinger
British Columbia provincial government of Glen Clark
Cabinet posts (5)
Predecessor	Office	Successor
Ministry Established	Minister of Social Development and Economic Security; July 21, 1999–August 25, 1999	cont'd into Miller Ministry
Ministry Established	Minister Responsible for Public Service; October 20, 1998–July 21, 1999	Helmut Giesbrecht
Penny Priddy	Minister of Labour; June 17, 1996–December 12, 1996	Joy MacPhail
Paul Ramsey	Minister of Education, Skills and Training; June 17, 1996–December 12, 1996	Joy MacPhail
cont'd from Harcourt Ministry	Minister of the Environment, Lands and Parks; February 22, 1996–June 17, 1996	Paul Ramsey
British Columbia provincial government of Mike Harcourt
Cabinet posts (4)
Predecessor	Office	Successor
Anita Hagen	Minister Responsible for Multiculturalism and Human Rights; September 15, 1993–May 10, 1995	Ujjal Dosanjh
John Cashore; Elizabeth Cull	Minister of the Environment, Lands and Parks; September 15, 1993–May 10, 1995; August 16, 1995–February 22, 1996	Elizabeth Cull cont'd into Clark Ministry
James Thomas Rabbitt	Minister of Labour and Consumer Services; November 5, 1991–September 15, 1993	Dan Miller
Ministry Established	Minister Responsible for Constitutional Affairs; November 5, 1991–September 15, 1993	Ministry Abolished
