= Campbell ministry =

Cabinet of British Columbia, 2001–2011

- 34th ministry of British Columbia

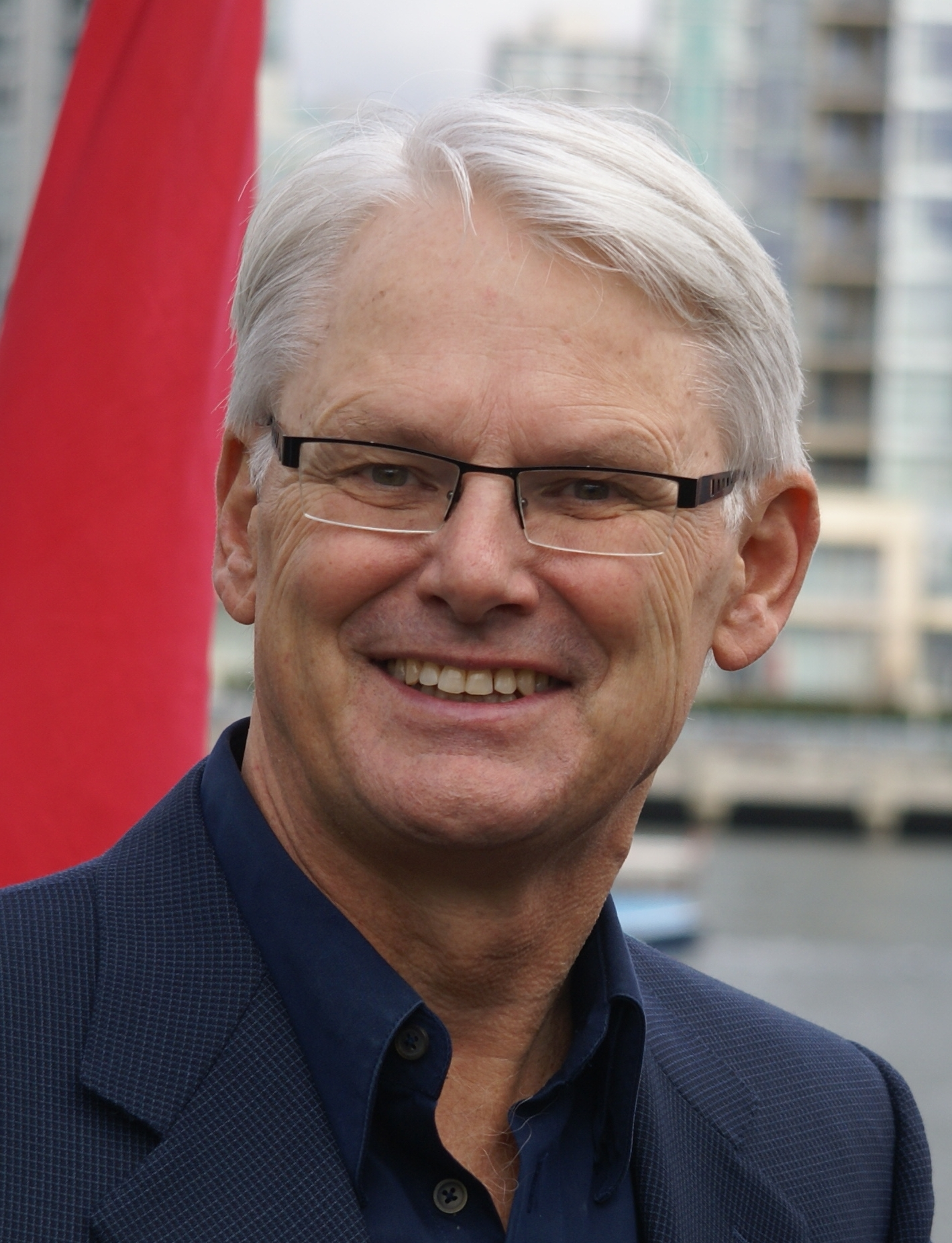
- Gordon Campbell in 2008
- Date formed: June 5, 2001
- Date dissolved: March 14, 2011

People and organisations
- Monarch: Elizabeth II
- Lieutenant Governor: Garde Gardom (2001–2001); Iona Campagnolo (2001–2007); Steven Point (2007–2011)
- Premier: Gordon Campbell
- Deputy Premier: Christy Clark (2001–2004); vacant (2004); Shirley Bond (2004–2009); Colin Hansen (2009–2011)
- Member party: Liberal Party
- Status in legislature: Majority
- Opposition party: New Democratic Party
- Opposition leader: Joy MacPhail (2001–2005); Carole James (2005–2011); Dawn Black (2011–2011)

History
- Incoming formation: 2001 general election
- Outgoing formation: 2011 Liberal leadership election
- Elections: 2001, 2005, 2009
- Legislature terms: 37th Parliament of British Columbia; 38th Parliament of British Columbia; 39th Parliament of British Columbia
- Predecessor: Dosanjh ministry
- Successor: Christy Clark ministry

The Campbell ministry was the combined Cabinet (formally the Executive Council of British Columbia) that governed British Columbia from June 5, 2001, to March 14, 2011. It was led by Gordon Campbell, the 34th premier of British Columbia, and consisted of members of the British Columbia Liberal Party.

The ministry succeeded the Dosanjh ministry, following the results of the 2001 election. The Campbell ministry was in office for the entirety of the 37th Parliament of British Columbia and 38th Parliament of British Columbia, and some of the 39th Parliament of British Columbia before Campbell resigned. It was succeeded by the Christy Clark ministry.

== List of ministers ==
Campbell ministry by portfolio
Portfolio	Minister	Tenure
Premier of British Columbia	Gordon Campbell	June 5, 2001 – March 14, 2011
Deputy Premier of British Columbia	Christy Clark	June 5, 2001 – September 20, 2004
Deputy Premier of British Columbia	Shirley Bond	September 20, 2004 – June 10, 2009
Deputy Premier of British Columbia	Colin Hansen	June 10, 2009 – March 14, 2011
Minister of Aboriginal Relations and Reconciliation	Tom Christensen	June 16, 2005 – August 15, 2006
Minister of Aboriginal Relations and Reconciliation	Mike de Jong	August 15, 2006 – June 10, 2009
Minister of Aboriginal Relations and Reconciliation	George Abbott	June 10, 2009 – October 25, 2010
Minister of Aboriginal Relations and Reconciliation	Barry Penner	October 25, 2010 – March 14, 2011
Minister of Advanced Education	Shirley Bond	March 14, 2001 – December 15, 2004
Minister of Advanced Education	Ida Chong	December 15, 2004 – June 16, 2005
Minister of Advanced Education	Murray Coell	June 16, 2005 – June 23, 2008
Minister of Advanced Education and Labour Market Development	Murray Coell	June 23, 2008 – June 10, 2009
Minister of Advanced Education and Labour Market Development	Moira Stilwell	June 10, 2009 – October 25, 2010
Minister of Agriculture (Note: "Agriculture, Food and Fisheries" from June 5, 2001, to June 16, 2005; "Agriculture and Lands" from June 16, 2005, to October 25, 2010)	John van Dongen	June 5, 2001 – January 28, 2003
Minister of Agriculture	Stan Hagen	January 28, 2003 – April 3, 2003
Minister of Agriculture	John van Dongen	April 3, 2003 – June 16, 2005
Minister of Agriculture	Pat Bell	June 16, 2005 – June 23, 2008
Minister of Agriculture	Stan Hagen	June 23, 2008 – January 20, 2009
Minister of Agriculture	Ron Cantelon	January 30, 2009 – June 10, 2009
Minister of Agriculture	Steve Thomson	June 10, 2009 – October 25, 2010
Minister of Agriculture	Ben Stewart	October 25, 2010 – March 14, 2011
Attorney General	Geoff Plant	June 5, 2001 – June 16, 2005
Attorney General	Wally Oppal	June 16, 2005 – June 10, 2009
Attorney General	Mike de Jong	June 10, 2009 – December 1, 2010
Attorney General	Barry Penner	December 1, 2010 – March 14, 2011
Minister of Children and Family Development	Gordie Hogg	June 5, 2001 – January 23, 2004
Minister of Children and Family Development	Christy Clark	January 26, 2004 – September 20, 2004
Minister of Children and Family Development	Stan Hagen	September 20, 2004 – August 15, 2006
Minister of Children and Family Development	Tom Christensen	August 15, 2006 – June 10, 2009
Minister of Children and Family Development	Mary Polak	June 10, 2009 – March 14, 2011
Minister of Citizens' Services	Ben Stewart	June 10, 2009 – June 11, 2010
Minister of Citizens' Services	Mary McNeil	June 11, 2010 – March 14, 2011
Minister of Community, Sport and Cultural Development (Note: "Community, Aboriginal and Women's Services" from June 5, 2001, to June 16, 2005; "Community Services" from June 16, 2005, to June 23, 2008; "Community Development" from June 23, 2008, to June 10, 2009; "Community and Rural Development" from June 10, 2009, to October 25, 2010.)	George Abbott	June 5, 2001 – January 26, 2004
Minister of Community, Sport and Cultural Development	Murray Coell	January 26, 2004 – June 16, 2005
Minister of Community, Sport and Cultural Development	Ida Chong	June 16, 2005 – June 23, 2008
Minister of Community, Sport and Cultural Development	Blair Lekstrom	June 23, 2008 – January 19, 2009
Minister of Community, Sport and Cultural Development	Kevin Krueger	January 19, 2009 – June 10, 2009
Minister of Community, Sport and Cultural Development	Bill Bennett	June 10, 2009 – June 11, 2010
Minister of Community, Sport and Cultural Development	Ben Stewart	June 11, 2010 – October 25, 2010
Minister of Community, Sport and Cultural Development	Stephanie Cadieux	October 25, 2010 – March 14, 2011
Minister of Competition, Science and Enterprise	Rick Thorpe	June 5, 2001 – January 26, 2004
Minister of Economic Development	Colin Hansen	June 16, 2005 – June 23, 2008
Minister of Education	Christy Clark	June 5, 2001 – January 26, 2004
Minister of Education	Tom Christensen	January 26, 2004 – June 16, 2005
Minister of Education	Shirley Bond	June 16, 2005 – June 10, 2009
Minister of Education	Margaret MacDiarmid	June 10, 2009 – October 25, 2010
Minister of Education	George Abbott	October 25, 2010 – November 25, 2010
Minister of Education	Margaret MacDiarmid	November 25, 2010 – March 14, 2011
Minister of Employment and Income Assistance	Claude Richmond	June 16, 2005 – June 23, 2008
Minister of Energy and Mines	Richard Neufeld	June 5, 2001 – June 16, 2005
Minister of Energy, Mines and Petroleum Resources	Richard Neufeld	June 16, 2005 – January 19, 2009
Minister of Energy, Mines and Petroleum Resources	Blair Lekstrom	January 19, 2009 – June 11, 2010
Minister of Energy, Mines and Petroleum Resources	Bill Bennett	June 11, 2010 – October 25, 2010
Minister of Energy	Bill Bennett	October 25, 2010 – November 17, 2010
Minister of Energy	Steve Thomsom	November 17, 2010 – March 14, 2011
Minister of Environment (Note: "Water, Land and Air Protection" from June 5, 2001, to June 16, 2005)	Joyce Murray	June 5, 2001 – January 26, 2004
Minister of Environment	Bill Barisoff	January 26, 2004 – June 16, 2005
Minister of Environment	Barry Penner	June 16, 2005 – October 25, 2010
Minister of Environment	Murray Coell	October 25. 2010 – March 14, 2011
Minister of Finance	Gary Collins	June 5, 2001 – December 15, 2004
Minister of Finance	Colin Hansen	December 15, 2004 – June 16, 2005
Minister of Finance	Carole Taylor	June 16, 2005 – June 23, 2008
Minister of Finance	Colin Hansen	June 23, 2008 – March 14, 2011
Minister of Forests	Mike de Jong	June 5, 2001 – June 16, 2005
Minister of Forests and Range	Rich Coleman	June 16, 2005 – June 23, 2008
Minister of Forests and Range	Pat Bell	June 23, 2008 – October 25, 2010
Minister of Forests, Mines and Lands	Pat Bell	October 25, 2010 – March 14, 2011
Minister of Health Planning	Sindi Hawkins	June 5, 2001 – January 26, 2004
Minister of Health Services (Note: "Minister of Health" from June 16, 2005, to June 23, 2008)	Colin Hansen	June 5, 2001 – December 15, 2004
Minister of Health Services	Shirley Bond	December 15, 2004 – June 16, 2005
Minister of Health Services	George Abbott	June 16, 2005 – June 10, 2009
Minister of Health Services	Kevin Falcon	June 10, 2009 – November 30, 2011
Minister of Health Services	Colin Hansen	November 30, 2011 – March 14, 2011
Minister of Healthy Living and Sport	Mary Polak	June 23, 2008 – June 10, 2009
Minister of Healthy Living and Sport	Ida Chong	June 10, 2009 – October 25, 2010
Minister of Housing and Social Development	Rich Coleman	June 23, 2008 – October 25, 2010
Minister of Human Resources	Murray Coell	June 5, 2001 – January 26, 2004
Minister of Human Resources	Stan Hagen	January 26, 2004 – September 20, 2004
Minister of Human Resources	Susan Brice	September 20, 2004 – June 26, 2005
Minister of Labour (Note: "Skills Development and Labour" from June 5, 2001, to June 16, 2005; "Labour and Citizens' Services" from June 16, 2001, to June 10, 2009)	Graham Bruce	June 5, 2001 – June 16, 2005
Minister of Labour	Mike de Jong	June 16, 2005 – August 15, 2006
Minister of Labour	Olga Ilich	August 15, 2006 – June 23, 2008
Minister of Labour	Iain Black	June 23, 2006 – June 10, 2009
Minister of Labour	Murray Coell	June 10, 2009 – October 25, 2010
Minister of Labour	Iain Black	October 25, 2010 – March 14, 2011
Minister of Management Services	Sandy Santori	June 5, 2001 – January 26, 2004
Minister of Management Services	Joyce Murray	January 26, 2004 – June 16, 2005
Minister of Natural Resource Operations	Steve Thomson	October 25, 2010 – March 14, 2011
Minister of Provincial Revenue	Bill Barisoff	June 5, 2001 – January 26, 2004
Minister of Provincial Revenue	Rick Thorpe	January 26, 2004 – June 16, 2005
Minister of Public Safety and Solicitor General	Rich Coleman	June 6, 2001 – June 16, 2005
Minister of Public Safety and Solicitor General	John Les	June 16, 2005 – April 1, 2008
Minister of Public Safety and Solicitor General	John van Dongen	April 1, 2008 – April 27, 2009
Minister of Public Safety and Solicitor General	Rich Coleman	April 27, 2009 – June 10, 2009
Minister of Public Safety and Solicitor General	Kash Heed	June 10, 2009 – April 9, 2010
Minister of Public Safety and Solicitor General	Mike de Jong	April 9, 2010 – May 4, 2010
Minister of Public Safety and Solicitor General	Kash Heed	May 4, 2010 – May 5, 2010
Minister of Public Safety and Solicitor General	Mike de Jong	May 5, 2010 – October 25, 2010
Minister of Public Safety and Solicitor General	Rich Coleman	October 25, 2010 – March 14, 2011
Minister of Regional Economic and Skills Development	Moira Stilwell	October 25, 2010 – November 22, 2010
Minister of Regional Economic and Skills Development	Ida Chong	November 22, 2010 – March 14, 2011
Minister of Science and Universities	Ida Chong	October 25, 2010 – March 14, 2011
Minister of Small Business (Note: "Small Business and Economic Development" from January 26, 2004, to June 16, 2005; "Small Business and Revenue" from June 16, 2005, to January 19, 2009; "Small Business, Technology and Economic Development" from January 19, 2009, to October 25, 2010; "Minister responsible for Small Business" from October 25, 2010, to March 14, 2011)	John Les	January 26, 2004 – June 16, 2005
Minister of Small Business	Rick Thorpe	June 16, 2005 – June 23, 2008
Minister of Small Business	Kevin Krueger	June 23, 2008 – January 19, 2009
Minister of Small Business	Ida Chong	January 19, 2009 – June 10, 2009
Minister of Small Business	Iain Black	June 10, 2009 – October 25, 2010
Minister of Small Business	Colin Hansen	October 25, 2010 – March 14, 2011
Minister of Social Development	Kevin Krueger	October 25, 2010 – March 14, 2011
Minister of Sustainable Resource Management	Stan Hagen	June 5, 2001 – January 26, 2004
Minister of Sustainable Resource Management	George Abbott	January 26, 2004 – June 16, 2005
Minister of Technology, Trade and the Arts	Ida Chong	June 23, 2008 – January 19, 2009
Minister of Tourism (Note: "Tourism, Sport and the Arts" from June 16, 2005, to June 23, 2008; "Tourism, Culture and the Arts" from June 23, 2008, to October 25, 2010; "Tourism, Trade and Investment" from October 25, 2010, to March 14, 2011)	Olga Ilich	June 16, 2005 – August 15, 2006
Minister of Tourism	Stan Hagen	August 15, 2006 – June 23, 2008
Minister of Tourism	Bill Bennett	June 23, 2008 – June 10, 2009
Minister of Tourism	Kevin Krueger	June 10, 2009 – October 25, 2010
Minister of Tourism	Margaret MacDiarmid	October 25, 2010 – March 14, 2011
Minister of Transportation and Infrastructure (Note: "Transportation" from June 5, 2001, to June 23, 2008)	Judith Reid	June 5, 2001 – January 26, 2004
Minister of Transportation and Infrastructure	Kevin Falcon	January 26, 2004 – June 10, 2009
Minister of Transportation and Infrastructure	Shirley Bond	June 10, 2009 – March 14, 2011
Minister of State for ActNow BC	Gordie Hogg	August 15, 2006 – June 23, 2008
Minister of State for ActNow BC	Mary McNeil	June 10, 2009 – June 11, 2010
Minister of State for Building Code Renewal	Naomi Yamamoto	October 25, 2010 – March 14, 2011
Minister of State for Community Charter	Ted Nebbeling	June 5, 2001 – January 26, 2004
Minister of State for Early Childhood Development	Linda Reid	June 5, 2001 – June 16, 2005
Minister of State for Forestry Operations	Roger Harris	January 26, 2004 – June 16, 2005
Minister of State for Immigration and Multicultural Services	Gulzar Singh Cheema	January 26, 2004 – March 8, 2004
Minister of State for Immigration and Multicultural Services	Patrick Wong	September 20, 2004 – June 16, 2005
Minister of State for Intergovernmental Relations	Greg Halsey-Brandt	June 5, 2001 – January 26, 2004
Minister of State for Intergovernmental Relations	Sindi Hawkins	January 26, 2004 – June 16, 2005
Minister of State for Intergovernmental Relations	John van Dongen	June 16, 2005 – June 23, 2008
Minister of State for Intergovernmental Relations	Joan McIntyre	June 23, 2008 – June 10, 2009
Minister of State for Intergovernmental Relations	Naomi Yamamoto	June 10, 2009 – October 25, 2010
Minister of State for Intermediate, Long Term and Home Care	Katherine Whittred	June 5, 2001 – January 26, 2004
Minister of State for Mental Health and Addiction Services (Note: "Mental Health" from June 5, 2001, to January 26, 2004)	Gulzar Singh Cheema	June 5, 2001 – January 26, 2004
Minister of State for Mental Health and Addiction Services	Susan Brice	January 26, 2004 – September 20, 2004
Minister of State for Mental Health and Addiction Services	Brenda Locke	September 20, 2004 – June 16, 2005
Minister of State for Mining	Pat Bell	January 26, 2004 – June 16, 2005
Minister of State for Mining	Bill Bennett	June 16, 2005 – February 7, 2007
Minister of State for Mining	Kevin Krueger	February 7, 2007 – June 23, 2008
Minister of State for Mining	Gordie Hogg	June 23, 2008 – June 10, 2009
Minister of State for Mining	Randy Hawes	June 10, 2009 – March 14, 2011
Minister of State for Olympics	Mary McNeil	June 10, 2009 – June 11, 2011
Minister of State for Resort Development	Sandy Santori	January 26, 2004 – January 11, 2005
Minister of State for Resort Development	Patty Sahota	February 1, 2005 – June 16, 2005
Minister of State for Women's Equality	Lynn Stephens	June 5, 2001 – January 26, 2004
Minister of State for Women's and Seniors' Services	Ida Chong	January 26, 2004 – December 15, 2004
Minister of State for Women's and Seniors' Services	Wendy McMahon	December 15, 2004 – June 16, 2005
Minister responsible for Asia-Pacific Initiative	Colin Hansen	June 16, 2005 – June 23, 2008
Minister responsible for Asia-Pacific Initiative	Ida Chong	June 23, 2008 – June 10, 2009
Minister responsible for Child Care	Linda Reid	June 16, 2005 – June 10, 2009
Minister responsible for Child Care	Mary Polak	June 10, 2009 – October 25, 2010
Minister responsible for Climate Action	Barry Penner	January 19, 2009 – June 10, 2009
Minister responsible for Climate Action	John Yap	June 10, 2009 – March 14, 2011
Minister responsible for Deregulation (Note: "Minister of State for Deregulation" from June 5, 2001, to January 26, 2004)	Kevin Falcon	June 5, 2001 – January 26, 2004
Minister responsible for Deregulation	Rick Thorpe	June 16, 2005 – June 23, 2008
Minister responsible for Deregulation	Kevin Krueger	June 23, 2008 – January 19, 2009
Minister responsible for Early Learning and Literacy	Shirley Bond	June 16, 2005 – June 10, 2009
Minister responsible for Early Learning and Literacy	Margaret MacDiarmid	June 10, 2009 – October 25, 2010
Minister responsible for Housing	Rich Coleman	June 16, 2005 – June 23, 2008
Minister responsible for Housing	Rich Coleman	October 25, 2010 – March 14, 2011
Minister responsible for Integrated Land Management Bureau	Pat Bell	June 10, 2009 – October 25, 2010
Minister responsible for Intergovernmental Relations Secretariat	Margaret MacDiarmid	October 25, 2010 – March 14, 2011
Minister responsible for Multiculturalism	Wally Oppal	June 16, 2005 – June 10, 2009
Minister responsible for Multiculturalism	Ben Stewart	June 10, 2009 – June 11, 2010
Minister responsible for Multiculturalism	Mary McNeil	June 11, 2010 – October 25, 2010
Minister responsible for Olympics	Colin Hansen	June 16, 2005 – June 10, 2009
Minister responsible for Public Affairs Bureau	Ben Stewart	June 10, 2009 – June 11, 2010
Minister responsible for Public Affairs Bureau	Mary McNeil	June 11, 2010 – October 25, 2010
Minister responsible for Research and Technology	Murray Coell	June 16, 2005 – June 23, 2008
Minister responsible for Seniors' and Women's Issues	Ida Chong	June 16, 2005 – June 23, 2008
Minister responsible for Treaty Negotiations	Geoff Plant	June 5, 2001 – June 16, 2005
Minister responsible for Water Stewardship and Sustainable Communities	Barry Penner	June 16, 2005 – June 23, 2008

Campbell ministry by minister
Minister	Portfolio	Tenure
George Abbott	Minister of Community, Aboriginal and Women's Services	June 5, 2001 – January 26, 2004
George Abbott	Minister of Sustainable Resource Management	January 26, 2004 – June 16, 2005
George Abbott	Minister of Health	June 16, 2005 – June 23, 2008
George Abbott	Minister of Health Services	June 23, 2008 – June 10, 2009
George Abbott	Minister of Aboriginal Relations and Reconciliation	June 10, 2009 – October 25, 2010
George Abbott	Minister of Education	October 25, 2010 – November 25, 2010
Bill Barisof	Minister of Provincial Revenue	June 5, 2001 – January 26, 2004
Bill Barisof	Minister of Water, Land and Air Protection	January 26, 2004 – June 16, 2005
Bill Barisof	Minister of State for Mining	January 26, 2004 – June 16, 2005
Pat Bell	Minister of Agriculture and Lands	June 16, 2005 – June 23, 2008
Pat Bell	Minister of Forests and Range	June 23, 2008 – October 25, 2010
Pat Bell	Minister responsible for Integrated Land Management Bureau	June 10, 2009 – October 25, 2010
Pat Bell	Minister of Forests, Mines and Lands	October 25, 2010 – March 14, 2011
Bill Bennett	Minister of State for Mining	June 16, 2005 – February 7, 2007
Bill Bennett	Minister of Tourism, Culture and the Arts	June 23, 2008 – June 10, 2009
Bill Bennett	Minister of Community and Rural Development	June 10, 2009 – June 11, 2010
Bill Bennett	Minister of Energy, Mines and Petroleum Resources	June 11, 2010 – October 25, 2010
Bill Bennett	Minister of Energy	October 25, 2010 – November 17, 2010
Iain Black	Minister of Labour and Citizens' Services	June 23, 2006 – June 10, 2009
Iain Black	Minister of Small Business, Technology and Economic Development	June 10, 2009 – October 25, 2010
Iain Black	Minister of Labour	October 25, 2010 – March 14, 2011
Shirley Bond	Minister of Advanced Education	March 14, 2001 – December 15, 2004
Shirley Bond	Deputy Premier of British Columbia	September 20, 2004 – June 10, 2009
Shirley Bond	Minister of Health Services	December 15, 2004 – June 16, 2005
Shirley Bond	Minister of Education	June 16, 2005 – June 10, 2009
Shirley Bond	Minister responsible for Early Learning and Literacy	June 16, 2005 – June 10, 2009
Shirley Bond	Minister of Transportation and Infrastructure	June 10, 2009 – March 14, 2011
Susan Brice	Minister of State for Mental Health and Addiction Services	January 26, 2004 – September 20, 2004
Susan Brice	Minister of Human Resources	September 20, 2004 – June 26, 2005
Graham Bruce	Minister of Skills Development and Labour	June 5, 2001 – June 16, 2005
Stephanie Cadieux	Minister of Community, Sport and Cultural Development	October 25, 2010 – March 14, 2011
Gordon Campbell	Premier of British Columbia	June 5, 2001 – March 14, 2011
Ron Cantelon	Minister of Agriculture and Lands	January 30, 2009 – June 10, 2009
Gulzar Singh Cheema	Minister of State for Mental Health	June 5, 2001 – January 26, 2004
Gulzar Singh Cheema	Minister of State for Immigration and Multicultural Services	January 26, 2004 – March 8, 2004
Ida Chong	Minister of State for Women's and Seniors' Services	January 26, 2004 – December 15, 2004
Ida Chong	Minister of Advanced Education	December 15, 2004 – June 16, 2005
Ida Chong	Minister of Community Services	June 16, 2005 – June 23, 2008
Ida Chong	Minister responsible for Seniors' and Women's Issues	June 16, 2005 – June 23, 2008
Ida Chong	Minister of Technology, Trade and the Arts	June 23, 2008 – January 19, 2009
Ida Chong	Minister responsible for Asia-Pacific Initiative	June 23, 2008 – June 10, 2009
Ida Chong	Minister of Small Business, Technology and Economic Development	January 19, 2009 – June 10, 2009
Ida Chong	Minister of Healthy Living and Sport	June 10, 2009 – October 25, 2010
Ida Chong	Minister of Science and Universities	October 25, 2010 – March 14, 2011
Ida Chong	Minister of Regional Economic and Skills Development	November 22, 2010 – March 14, 2011
Tom Christensen	Minister of Education	January 26, 2004 – June 16, 2005
Tom Christensen	Minister of Aboriginal Relations and Reconciliation	June 16, 2005 – August 15, 2006
Tom Christensen	Minister of Children and Family Development	August 15, 2006 – June 10, 2009
Christy Clark	Deputy Premier of British Columbia	June 5, 2001 – September 20, 2004
Christy Clark	Minister of Education	June 5, 2001 – January 26, 2004
Christy Clark	Minister of Children and Family Development	January 26, 2004 – September 20, 2004
Murray Coell	Minister of Human Resources	June 5, 2001 – January 26, 2004
Murray Coell	Minister of Community, Aboriginal and Women's Services	January 26, 2004 – June 16, 2005
Murray Coell	Minister of Advanced Education	June 16, 2005 – June 23, 2008
Murray Coell	Minister responsible for Research and Technology	June 16, 2005 – June 23, 2008
Murray Coell	Minister of Advanced Education and Labour Market Development	June 23, 2008 – June 10, 2009
Murray Coell	Minister of Labour	June 10, 2009 – October 25, 2010
Murray Coell	Minister of Environment	October 25. 2010 – March 14, 2011
Rich Coleman	Minister of Public Safety and Solicitor General	June 6, 2001 – June 16, 2005
Rich Coleman	Minister of Forests and Range	June 16, 2005 – June 23, 2008
Rich Coleman	Minister responsible for Housing	June 16, 2005 – June 23, 2008
Rich Coleman	Minister of Housing and Social Development	June 23, 2008 – October 25, 2010
Rich Coleman	Minister of Public Safety and Solicitor General	April 27, 2009 – June 10, 2009
Rich Coleman	Minister of Public Safety and Solicitor General	October 25, 2010 – March 14, 2011
Rich Coleman	Minister responsible for Housing	October 25, 2010 – March 14, 2011
Gary Collins	Minister of Finance	June 5, 2001 – December 15, 2004
Mike de Jong	Minister of Forests	June 5, 2001 – June 16, 2005
Mike de Jong	Minister of Labour and Citizens' Services	June 16, 2005 – August 15, 2006
Mike de Jong	Minister of Aboriginal Relations and Reconciliation	August 15, 2006 – June 10, 2009
Mike de Jong	Attorney General	June 10, 2009 – December 1, 2010
Mike de Jong	Minister of Public Safety and Solicitor General	April 9, 2010 – May 4, 2010
Mike de Jong	Minister of Public Safety and Solicitor General	May 5, 2010 – October 25, 2010
Kevin Falcon	Minister of State for Deregulation	June 5, 2001 – January 26, 2004
Kevin Falcon	Minister of Transportation	January 26, 2004 – June 23, 2008
Kevin Falcon	Minister of Transportation and Infrastructure	June 23, 2008 – June 10, 2009
Kevin Falcon	Minister of Health Services	June 10, 2009 – November 30, 2011
Stan Hagen	Minister of Sustainable Resource Management	June 5, 2001 – January 26, 2004
Stan Hagen	Minister of Agriculture, Food and Fisheries	January 28, 2003 – April 3, 2003
Stan Hagen	Minister of Human Resources	January 26, 2004 – September 20, 2004
Stan Hagen	Minister of Children and Family Development	September 20, 2004 – August 15, 2006
Stan Hagen	Minister of Tourism, Sport and the Arts	August 15, 2006 – June 23, 2008
Stan Hagen	Minister of Agriculture and Lands	June 23, 2008 – January 20, 2009
Greg Halsey-Brandt	Minister of State for Intergovernmental Relations	June 5, 2001 – January 26, 2004
Colin Hansen	Minister of Health Services	June 5, 2001 – December 15, 2004
Colin Hansen	Minister of Finance	December 15, 2004 – June 16, 2005
Colin Hansen	Minister of Economic Development	June 16, 2005 – June 23, 2008
Colin Hansen	Minister responsible for Asia-Pacific Initiative	June 16, 2005 – June 23, 2008
Colin Hansen	Minister responsible for Olympics	June 16, 2005 – June 10, 2009
Colin Hansen	Minister of Finance	June 23, 2008 – March 14, 2011
Colin Hansen	Deputy Premier of British Columbia	June 10, 2009 – March 14, 2011
Colin Hansen	Minister responsible for Small Business	October 25, 2010 – March 14, 2011
Colin Hansen	Minister of Health Services	November 30, 2011 – March 14, 2011
Roger Harris	Minister of State for Forestry Operations	January 26, 2004 – June 16, 2005
Randy Hawes	Minister of State for Mining	June 10, 2009 – March 14, 2011
Sindi Hawkins	Minister of Health Planning	June 5, 2001 – January 26, 2004
Sindi Hawkins	Minister of State for Intergovernmental Relations	January 26, 2004 – June 16, 2005
Kash Heed	Minister of Public Safety and Solicitor General	June 10, 2009 – April 9, 2010
Kash Heed	Minister of Public Safety and Solicitor General	May 4, 2010 – May 5, 2010
Gordie Hogg	Minister of Children and Family Development	June 5, 2001 – January 23, 2004
Gordie Hogg	Minister of State for ActNow BC	August 15, 2006 – June 23, 2008
Gordie Hogg	Minister of State for Mining	June 23, 2008 – June 10, 2009
Olga Ilich	Minister of Tourism, Sport and the Arts	June 16, 2005 – August 15, 2006
Olga Ilich	Minister of Labour and Citizens' Services	August 15, 2006 – June 23, 2008
Kevin Krueger	Minister of State for Mining	February 7, 2007 – June 23, 2008
Kevin Krueger	Minister of Small Business and Revenue	June 23, 2008 – January 19, 2009
Kevin Krueger	Minister responsible for Deregulation	June 23, 2008 – January 19, 2009
Kevin Krueger	Minister of Community Development	January 19, 2009 – June 10, 2009
Kevin Krueger	Minister of Tourism, Culture and the Arts	June 10, 2009 – October 25, 2010
Kevin Krueger	Minister of Social Development	October 25, 2010 – March 14, 2011
Blair Lekstrom	Minister of Community Development	June 23, 2008 – January 19, 2009
Blair Lekstrom	Minister of Energy, Mines and Petroleum Resources	January 19, 2009 – June 11, 2010
John Les	Minister of Small Business and Economic Development	January 26, 2004 – June 16, 2005
John Les	Minister of Public Safety and Solicitor General	June 16, 2005 – April 1, 2008
Brenda Locke	Minister of State for Mental Health and Addiction Services	September 20, 2004 – June 16, 2005
Margaret MacDiarmid	Minister of Education	June 10, 2009 – October 25, 2010
Margaret MacDiarmid	Minister responsible for Early Learning and Literacy	June 10, 2009 – October 25, 2010
Margaret MacDiarmid	Minister of Tourism, Trade and Investment	October 25, 2010 – March 14, 2011
Margaret MacDiarmid	Minister responsible for Intergovernmental Relations Secretariat	October 25, 2010 – March 14, 2011
Margaret MacDiarmid	Minister of Education	November 25, 2010 – March 14, 2011
Joan McIntyre	Minister of State for Intergovernmental Relations	June 23, 2008 – June 10, 2009
Wendy McMahon	Minister of State for Women's and Seniors' Services	December 15, 2004 – June 16, 2005
Mary McNeil	Minister of State for ActNow BC	June 10, 2009 – June 11, 2010
Mary McNeil	Minister of Citizens' Services	June 11, 2010 – March 14, 2011
Joyce Murray	Minister of Water, Land and Air Protection	June 5, 2001 – January 26, 2004
Joyce Murray	Minister of Management Services	January 26, 2004 – June 16, 2005
Ted Nebbeling	Minister of State for Community Charter	June 5, 2001 – January 26, 2004
Richard Neufeld	Minister of Energy and Mines	June 5, 2001 – June 16, 2005
Richard Neufeld	Minister of Energy, Mines and Petroleum Resources	June 16, 2005 – January 19, 2009
Wally Oppal	Attorney General	June 16, 2005 – June 10, 2009
Wally Oppal	Minister responsible for Multiculturalism	June 16, 2005 – June 10, 2009
Barry Penner	Minister responsible for Water Stewardship and Sustainable Communities	June 16, 2005 – June 23, 2008
Barry Penner	Minister of Environment	June 16, 2005 – October 25, 2010
Barry Penner	Minister responsible for Climate Action	January 19, 2009 – June 10, 2009
Barry Penner	Minister of Aboriginal Relations and Reconciliation	October 25, 2010 – March 14, 2011
Barry Penner	Attorney General	December 1, 2010 – March 14, 2011
Geoff Plant	Attorney General	June 5, 2001 – June 16, 2005
Geoff Plant	Minister responsible for Treaty Negotiations	June 5, 2001 – June 16, 2005
Mary Polak	Minister of Healthy Living and Sport	June 23, 2008 – June 10, 2009
Mary Polak	Minister of State for Olympics	June 10, 2009 – June 11, 2011
Mary Polak	Minister of Children and Family Development	June 10, 2009 – March 14, 2011
Mary Polak	Minister responsible for Child Care	June 10, 2009 – October 25, 2010
Mary Polak	Minister responsible for Multiculturalism	June 11, 2010 – October 25, 2010
Mary Polak	Minister responsible for Public Affairs Bureau	June 11, 2010 – October 25, 2010
Judith Reid	Minister of Transportation	June 5, 2001 – January 26, 2004
Linda Reid	Minister of State for Early Childhood Development	June 5, 2001 – June 16, 2005
Linda Reid	Minister responsible for Child Care	June 16, 2005 – June 10, 2009
Claude Richmond	Minister of Employment and Income Assistance	June 16, 2005 – June 23, 2008
Patty Sahota	Minister of State for Resort Development	February 1, 2005 – June 16, 2005
Sandy Santori	Minister of Management Services	June 5, 2001 – January 26, 2004
Sandy Santori	Minister of State for Resort Development	January 26, 2004 – January 11, 2005
Lynn Stephens	Minister of State for Women's Equality	June 5, 2001 – January 26, 2004
Ben Stewart	Minister of Citizens' Services	June 10, 2009 – June 11, 2010
Ben Stewart	Minister responsible for Multiculturalism	June 10, 2009 – June 11, 2010
Ben Stewart	Minister responsible for Public Affairs Bureau	June 10, 2009 – June 11, 2010
Ben Stewart	Minister of Community and Rural Development	June 11, 2010 – October 25, 2010
Ben Stewart	Minister of Agriculture	October 25, 2010 – March 14, 2011
Moira Stilwell	Minister of Advanced Education and Labour Market Development	June 10, 2009 – October 25, 2010
Moira Stilwell	Minister of Regional Economic and Skills Development	October 25, 2010 – November 22, 2010
Carole Taylor	Minister of Finance	June 16, 2005 – June 23, 2008
Steve Thomsom	Minister of Agriculture and Lands	June 10, 2009 – October 25, 2010
Steve Thomsom	Minister of Natural Resource Operations	October 25, 2010 – March 14, 2011
Steve Thomsom	Minister of Energy	November 17, 2010 – March 14, 2011
Rick Thorpe	Minister of Competition, Science and Enterprise	June 5, 2001 – January 26, 2004
Rick Thorpe	Minister of Provincial Revenue	January 26, 2004 – June 16, 2005
Rick Thorpe	Minister of Small Business and Revenue	June 16, 2005 – June 23, 2008
Rick Thorpe	Minister responsible for Deregulation	June 16, 2005 – June 23, 2008
John van Dongen	Minister of Agriculture, Food and Fisheries	June 5, 2001 – January 28, 2003
John van Dongen	Minister of Agriculture, Food and Fisheries	April 3, 2003 – June 16, 2005
John van Dongen	Minister of State for Intergovernmental Relations	June 16, 2005 – June 23, 2008
John van Dongen	Minister of Public Safety and Solicitor General	April 1, 2008 – April 27, 2009
Katherine Whittred	Minister of State for Intermediate, Long Term and Home Care	June 5, 2001 – January 26, 2004
Patrick Wong	Minister of State for Immigration and Multicultural Services	September 20, 2004 – June 16, 2005
Naomi Yamamoto	Minister of State for Intergovernmental Relations	June 10, 2009 – October 25, 2010
Naomi Yamamoto	Minister of State for Building Code Renewal	October 25, 2010 – March 14, 2011
John Yap	Minister responsible for Climate Action	June 10, 2009 – March 14, 2011

== Cabinet composition and shuffles ==
Campbell's first cabinet was sworn in on June 5, 2001. At 28 ministers, including Campbell himself, it was the largest cabinet in BC history. 21 members were full ministers and seven were ministers of state, reviving a practice last used in the Vander Zalm ministry. The size came as a surprise, since in the 1996 election, Campbell had run of a promise to reduce the size of cabinet to 12 members. Campbell made significant changes to the structuring of the ministries. Several ministries were divided: Health was split into two ministries, Health Planning and Health Services, and additionally supported by two ministers of state (mental health; intermediate, long-term and home care); Environment was split into Sustainable Resource Management and Water, Land and Air Protection; and Attorney General's responsibility for police and correctional services formed the basis of the new Ministry of Public Safety and Solicitor General. Meanwhile, the ministries for Women's Equality, Multiculturalism, Municipal Affairs and Aboriginal Affairs were merged into the new Ministry of Community, Aboriginal and Women's Services (alongside an additional minister of state for women's equality); and the ministries for Employment and Investment and Small Business, Tourism and Culture were joined together as the new Ministry of Competition, Science and Enterprise.

Campbell initiated his first major shuffle on January 26, 2004. Six ministers were dropped from cabinet — Greg Halsey-Brandt, Gordon Hogg, Ted Nebbeling, Judith Reid, Lynne Stephens and Katherine Whittred — and six new members joined: Pat Bell, Susan Brice, Ida Chong, Tom Christensen, Roger Harris and John Les. Among the ministers who remained in cabinet, Christy Clark moved from education to children and families, Kevin Falcon from deregulation to transport, and Sindi Hawkins from to health planning to intergovernmental affairs. In all, eleven ministers changed portfolios. Additionally, Campbell adjusted the junior ministries. Ministries of state for health planning, deregulation and the Community Charter were eliminated; women's equality and senior care were combined into women's and seniors' services; and new posts were added to oversee forest operations, mining, resort development and immigration and multicultural services. The cabinet remained at 28 ministers.

Following the government's re-election in the 2005 election, Campbell adjusted his cabinet. The cabinet's size was reduced to 23 ministers, in part due to several defeats in the election. Newly-elected MLAs Carole Taylor and Wally Oppal were named finance minister and attorney general, respectively. Colin Hansen moved to economic development, as well as becoming minister responsible for the government's role in the 2010 Olympics; Shirley Bond moved to education; George Abbott moved to health; Rich Coleman moved to forests; and Christensen took on the new portfolio of Aboriginal relations and reconciliation.

On August 15, 2006, Campbell swapped four ministers' portfolios. Stan Hagen moved from children and family development to tourism, sport and arts; Christensen moved from aboriginal relations to children and family development; Mike de Jong moved to aboriginal relations from labour; and Olga Illich moved from tourism to labour. Additionally, Hogg rejoined cabinet as minister of state for ActNow BC.

On June 22, 2008, Campbell shuffled his cabinet in what he called a "mild" change. Colin Hansen returned as finance minister, after Taylor announced she would not run in the next election and was dropped from cabinet. Blair Lekstrom and Bill Bennett joined cabinet from the backbenches, becoming minister of community services and minister of tourism, respectively. Coleman moved from forestry to the new ministry of housing and social development.

Following the 2009 election, Campbell named a new, 24-member cabinet. Hansen remained finance minister and was promoted to deputy premier; de Jong became attorney general; Falcon moved to health services; Bond to transportation; and Abbott to health. Additionally, four members — Linda Reid, Gordie Hogg, Ron Cantelon and Joan McIntyre — were dropped, and eight new members joined cabinet: Randy Hawes (mining), Kash Heed (solicitor general), Mary McNeil (Olympics and ActNow), Margaret MacDiarmid (education), Ben Stewart (citizens' services), Moira Stilwell (advanced education), Steve Thomsom (agriculture), Naomi Yamamoto (intergovernmental relations) and John Yap (climate action).

On April 9, 2010, Heed resigned from cabinet after he learned the RCMP was investigating his campaign for violations of the Elections Act. De Jong stepped in as solicitor general on an interim basis. Heed returned to cabinet on May 4, after being cleared of wrongdoing by the special prosecutor; however, the following day, the special prosecutor himself resigned after it came out that his firm had donated to Heed's campaign. Heed resigned from cabinet again, pending a more thorough investigation, and de Jong again stepped in as solicitor general.

Campbell shuffled his cabinet once more on October 25, 2010. The shuffle came amidst cratering poll numbers. Sixteen members changed portfolios, with only six staying put: Bond (transport), de Jong (attorney general), Hawes (mining), McNeil (citizens' services), Mary Polak (children and family development) and Yap (climate action).
