= Miller ministry (British Columbia) =

Cabinet of British Columbia, 1999–2000

- 32nd ministry of British Columbia
- Date formed: August 25, 1999
- Date dissolved: February 24, 2000

People and organisations
- Monarch: Elizabeth II
- Lieutenant Governor: Garde Gardom
- Premier: Dan Miller
- Deputy Premier: Lois Boone
- Member party: New Democratic Party
- Status in legislature: Majority
- Opposition party: Liberal Party
- Opposition leader: Gordon Campbell

History
- Legislature term: 36th Parliament of British Columbia
- Incoming formation: Resignation of Glen Clark
- Outgoing formation: 2000 NDP leadership election
- Predecessor: Glen Clark ministry
- Successor: Dosanjh ministry

The Miller ministry was the combined Cabinet (formally the Executive Council of British Columbia) that governed British Columbia from August 25, 1999, to February 24, 2000. It was led by Dan Miller, the 32nd premier of British Columbia, and consisted of members of the New Democratic Party (NDP).

The Miller ministry was in office for six months of 36th Parliament of British Columbia, coinciding with its third session. Miller was Deputy Premier of British Columbia in the preceding Glen Clark ministry; following Glen Clark's resignation, the NDP caucus unanimously selected him to be the leader (and thus premier) while the party could organize a leadership election.

On September 21, 1999, Miller made a small cabinet shuffle: moving Gordon Wilson from finance to education, and Paul Ramsey from education to finance. Wilson had told the Premier that he could not devote his full attention to the budget while mounting a leadership campaign.

Following the election of Ujjal Dosanjh in the 2000 leadership election, the ministry was replaced by the Dosanjh ministry.

== List of ministers ==
Miller ministry by portfolio
Portfolio	Minister	Tenure	
Portfolio	Minister	Start	End
Premier of British Columbia	Dan Miller	August 25, 1999	February 24, 2000
Deputy Premier of British Columbia	Lois Boone	August 25, 1999	February 24, 2000
Minister of Aboriginal Affairs	Dale Lovick	August 25, 1999	February 24, 2000
Minister of Advanced Education, Training and Technology	Andrew Petter	August 25, 1999	February 24, 2000
Minister of Agriculture and Food	Corky Evans	August 25, 1999	February 24, 2000
Attorney General	Ujjal Dosanjh	August 25, 1999	February 24, 2000
Minister of Children and Families	Lois Boone	August 25, 1999	February 24, 2000
Minister of Community Development, Cooperatives and Volunteers	Jan Pullinger	August 25, 1999	February 24, 2000
Minister of Education	Paul Ramsey	August 25, 1999	September 21, 1999
Minister of Education	Gordon Wilson	September 21, 1999	February 24, 2000
Minister of Employment and Investment	Mike Farnworth	August 25, 1999	February 24, 2000
Minister of Energy and Mines	Dan Miller	August 25, 1999	February 24, 2000
Minister of Environment, Land and Parks	Joan Sawicki	August 25, 1999	February 24, 2000
Minister responsible for Ferries	Gordon Wilson	August 25, 1999	February 24, 2000
Minister of Finance and Corporate Relations	Gordon Wilson	August 25, 1999	September 21, 1999
Minister of Finance and Corporate Relations	Paul Ramsey	September 21, 1999	February 24, 2000
Minister of Fisheries	Dennis Streifel	August 25, 1999	February 24, 2000
Minister of Forests	David Zirnhelt	August 25, 1999	February 24, 2000
Minister of Health	Penny Priddy	August 25, 1999	February 24, 2000
Minister responsible for Housing	Mike Farnworth	August 25, 1999	February 24, 2000
Minister responsible for ICBC	Dale Lovick	August 25, 1999	February 24, 2000
Minister of Intergovernmental Relations	Andrew Petter	August 25, 1999	February 24, 2000
Minister of Labour	Joan Smallwood	August 25, 1999	February 24, 2000
Minister responsible for Multiculturalism, Human Rights and Immigration	Ujjal Dosanjh	August 25, 1999	February 24, 2000
Minister of Municipal Affairs	Jim Doyle	August 25, 1999	February 24, 2000
Minister responsible for Northern Development	Dan Miller	August 25, 1999	February 24, 2000
Minister responsible for the Public Service	Helmut Giesbrecht	August 25, 1999	February 24, 2000
Minister responsible for Seniors	Penny Priddy	August 25, 1999	February 24, 2000
Minister of Tourism, Small Business and Culture	Ian Waddell	August 25, 1999	February 24, 2000
Minister of Social Development and Economic Security	Moe Sihota	August 25, 1999	February 24, 2000
Minister of Transportation and Highways	Harry Lali	August 25, 1999	February 24, 2000
Minister of Women's Equality	Jenny Kwan	August 25, 1999	February 24, 2000
Minister responsible for Youth	Andrew Petter	August 25, 1999	February 24, 2000
