= Clark ministry =

Clark ministry may refer to:

- 21st Canadian Ministry, the Canadian government led by Joe Clark from 1979 to 1980
- Christy Clark ministry, the British Columbia government led by Christy Clark from 2011 to 2017
- Glen Clark ministry, the British Columbia government led by Glen Clark from 1996 to 1999
