= Glen Clark ministry =

Cabinet of British Columbia, 1996–1999

- 31st ministry of British Columbia

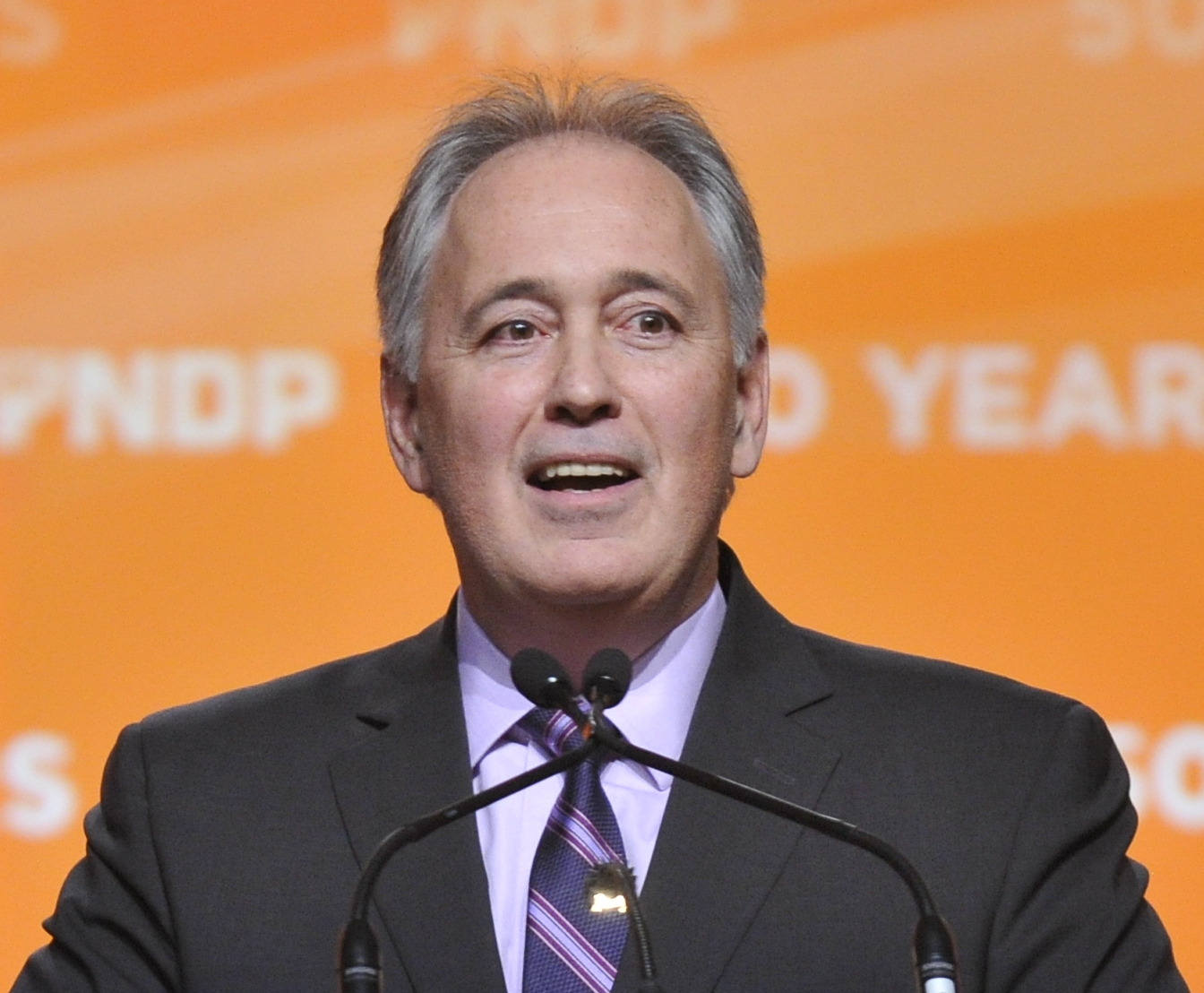
- Glen Clark in 2011
- Date formed: February 22, 1996
- Date dissolved: August 25, 1999

People and organisations
- Monarch: Elizabeth II
- Lieutenant Governor: Garde Gardom
- Premier: Glen Clark
- Deputy Premier: Dan Miller
- Member party: New Democratic Party
- Status in legislature: Majority
- Opposition party: Liberal Party
- Opposition leader: Gordon Campbell

History
- Election: 1996
- Legislature terms: 35th Parliament of British Columbia; 36th Parliament of British Columbia
- Predecessor: Harcourt ministry
- Successor: Miller ministry

The Glen Clark ministry was the combined Cabinet (formally the Executive Council of British Columbia) that governed British Columbia from February 22, 1996, to August 25, 1999. It was led by Glen Clark, the 31st premier of British Columbia, and consisted of members of the New Democratic Party (NDP).

The Glen Clark ministry was established in the final months of the 35th Parliament of British Columbia, after Mike Harcourt stepped down as leader and Clark was elected as his successor. Following the 1996 British Columbia general election, it continued to govern through the first three years of the 36th Parliament of British Columbia, until Clark stepped down in 1999. It was succeeded by the Miller ministry.

== List of ministers ==
Glen Clark ministry by portfolio
Portfolio	Minister	Tenure	
Portfolio	Minister	Start	End
Premier of British Columbia	Glen Clark	February 22, 1996	August 25, 1999
Deputy Premier of British Columbia	Dan Miller	February 28, 1996	August 25, 1999
Minister of Aboriginal Affairs	John Cashore	February 28, 1996	February 18, 1998
Minister of Aboriginal Affairs	Dale Lovick	February 18, 1998	January 29, 1999
Minister of Aboriginal Affairs	Gordon Wilson	January 29, 1999	July 21, 1999
Minister of Aboriginal Affairs	Dale Lovick	July 21, 1999	August 25, 1999
Minister of Advanced Education, Training and Technology	Andrew Petter	February 18, 1998	August 25, 1999
Minister of Agriculture, Fisheries and Food	David Zirnhelt	February 28, 1996	June 17, 1996
Minister of Agriculture, Fisheries and Food	Corky Evans	June 17, 1996	February 18, 1998
Minister of Agriculture and Food	Corky Evans	February 18, 1998	August 25, 1999
Attorney General	Ujjal Dosanjh	February 28, 1996	August 25, 1999
Minister responsible for British Columbia Ferry Corporation	Gordon Wilson	January 29, 1999	August 25, 1999
Minister of Children and Families	Penny Priddy	September 23, 1996	February 18, 1998
Minister of Children and Families	Lois Boone	February 18, 1998	August 25, 1999
Minister of Community Development, Co-operatives and Volunteers	Jan Pullinger	July 21, 1999	August 25, 1999
Minister of Education (Note: "Education, Skills and Training" from February 22, 1996 to February 18, 1998)	Paul Ramsey	February 28, 1996	June 17, 1996
Minister of Education	Moe Sihota	June 17, 1996	December 12, 1996
Minister of Education	Joy MacPhail	December 12, 1996	January 6, 1997
Minister of Education	Paul Ramsey	January 6, 1997	August 25, 1999
Minister of Employment and Investment	Dan Miller	February 28, 1996	February 18, 1998
Minister of Employment and Investment	Mike Farnworth	February 18, 1998	August 25, 1999
Minister of Energy and Mines	Dan Miller	February 18, 1998	August 25, 1999
Minister of Environment, Land and Parks	Moe Sihota	February 28, 1996	June 17, 1996
Minister of Environment, Land and Parks	Paul Ramsey	June 17, 1996	January 6, 1997
Minister of Environment, Land and Parks	Cathy McGregor	January 6, 1997	July 21, 1999
Minister of Environment, Land and Parks	Joan Sawicki	July 21, 1999	August 25, 1999
Minister of Finance and Corporate Relations	Elizabeth Cull	February 28, 1996	June 17, 1996
Minister of Finance and Corporate Relations	Andrew Petter	June 17, 1996	February 18, 1998
Minister of Finance and Corporate Relations	Joy MacPhail	February 18, 1998	July 16, 1999
Minister of Finance and Corporate Relations	Gordon Wilson	July 16, 1999	August 25, 1999
Minister of Fisheries	Dennis Streifel	February 18, 1998	August 25, 1999
Minister of Forests	Dennis Streifel	February 28, 1996	June 17, 1996
Minister of Forests	David Zirnhelt	June 17, 1996	August 25, 1999
Minister of Health	Andrew Petter	February 28, 1996	June 17, 1996
Minister of Health	Joy MacPhail	June 17, 1996	February 18, 1998
Minister of Health	Penny Priddy	February 18, 1998	August 25, 1999
Minister responsible for Housing	Mike Farnworth	February 18, 1998	July 21, 1999
Minister of Human Resources	Dennis Streifel	September 23, 1996	February 18, 1998
Minister of Human Resources	Jan Pullinger	February 18, 1998	July 21, 1999
Minister responsible for ICBC	Dale Lovick	January 29, 1999	August 25, 1999
Minister of Intergovernmental Relations (Note: "Minister responsible for Intergovernmental Relations" from February 28, 1996 to February 18, 1998)	Andrew Petter	February 28, 1996	August 25, 1999
Minister of Labour	Penny Priddy	February 28, 1996	June 17, 1996
Minister of Labour	Moe Sihota	June 17, 1996	December 12, 1996
Minister of Labour	Joy MacPhail	December 12, 1996	January 6, 1997
Minister of Labour	John Cashore	January 6, 1997	February 18, 1998
Minister of Labour	Dale Lovick	February 18, 1998	July 21, 1999
Minister of Labour	Joan Smallwood	July 21, 1999	August 25, 1999
Minister responsible for Multiculturalism, Human Rights and Immigration	Ujjal Dosanjh	February 28, 1996	August 25, 1999
Minister of Municipal Affairs and Housing	Lois Boone	February 28, 1996	June 17, 1996
Minister of Municipal Affairs and Housing	Dan Miller	June 17, 1996	January 6, 1997
Minister of Municipal Affairs and Housing	Mike Farnworth	January 6, 1997	February 18, 1998
Minister of Municipal Affairs	Jenny Kwan	February 18, 1998	July 21, 1999
Minister of Municipal Affairs	Jim Doyle	July 21, 1999	August 25, 1999
Minister responsible for Northern Development	Dan Miller	February 18, 1998	August 25, 1999
Minister responsible for Public Service	Moe Sihota	October 20, 1998	July 21, 1999
Minister responsible for Public Service	Helmut Giesbrecht	July 21, 1999	August 25, 1999
Minister responsible for Seniors	Andrew Petter	February 28, 1996	June 17, 1996
Minister responsible for Seniors	Joy MacPhail	June 17, 1996	February 18, 1998
Minister responsible for Seniors	Penny Priddy	February 18, 1998	August 25, 1999
Minister of Small Business, Tourism and Culture	Bill Barlee	February 28, 1996	June 17, 1996
Minister of Small Business, Tourism and Culture	Penny Priddy	June 17, 1996	September 23, 1996
Minister of Small Business, Tourism and Culture	Dan Miller	June 26, 1996	September 3, 1996 (acting)
Minister of Small Business, Tourism and Culture	Jan Pullinger	September 23, 1996	February 18, 1998
Minister of Small Business, Tourism and Culture	Ian Waddell	February 18, 1998	August 25, 1999
Minister of Social Development and Economic Security	Moe Sihota	July 21, 1999	August 25, 1999
Minister of Social Services	Joy MacPhail	February 28, 1996	June 17, 1996
Minister of Social Services	Dennis Streifel	June 17, 1996	September 23, 1996
Minister of Transportation and Highways	Corky Evans	February 28, 1996	June 17, 1996
Minister of Transportation and Highways	Lois Boone	June 17, 1996	February 18, 1998
Minister of Transportation and Highways	Harry Lali	February 18, 1998	August 25, 1999
Minister responsible for Volunteers and Community Services Sector	Jan Pullinger	March 21, 1998	July 21, 1999
Minister of Women's Equality	Sue Hammell	February 28, 1996	July 19, 1999
Minister of Women's Equality	Jenny Kwan	July 21, 1999	August 25, 1999
Minister responsible for Youth	Glen Clark	February 28, 1996	August 25, 1999

== Cabinet composition and shuffles ==
Clark's initial cabinet consisted of 15 members, down from 18 in the Harcourt ministry. Clark reduced the number of portfolios by three: the ministries of government services and housing were eliminated, and the energy, mines and petroleum portfolio was merged with employment and investment. Additionally, the ministry of skills, training and labour was split, with the responsibility for skills and labour moved under the ministry of education. Clark made only modest changes to the cabinet: of the so-called "gang of six" that, along with Clark, had shaped much of Harcourt's agenda, three kept their portfolios — Moe Sihota (environment), Elizabeth Cull (finance), Joy MacPhail (social services) — and two earned promotions: Dan Miller moved to the enlarged ministry of employment and investment and was named deputy premier, and Andrew Petter moved to health. Additionally, four other ministers held onto their portfolios: John Cashore (aboriginal affairs), David Zirnhelt (agriculture), Ujjal Dosanjh (attorney general) and Bill Barlee (small business and tourism). Five ministers were dropped, as they had decided against running for re-election: Art Charbonneau, Anne Edwards, Darlene Marzari, Jackie Pement and Harcourt himself. Three new ministers were added: Lois Boone, who had briefly served in the Harcourt ministry; Corky Evans, second-place finisher in the 1996 leadership election; and Dennis Streifel.

Following the 1996 election, Clark shuffled his cabinet. The number of ministers was reduced further, to 13, which Clark said was the smallest in "40 or 50 years". Cull and Barlee were dropped from cabinet due to losing re-election, and Clark decided to give more responsibilities to the remaining ministers rather than elevate backbenchers, believing that it would "bring some real focus to government". He admitted, however, that the ministers couldn't be expected to carry the larger workload forever, and anticipated expanding the cabinet by three or four ministers in about a year's time. With Petter taking over finance, Sihota taking both labour and education, MacPhail taking health and Miller gaining municipal affairs and housing, journalists Jeff Lee and Vaughn Palmer, both of the Vancouver Sun, noted that the "gang of five" increased their presence in the government.

On June 26, 1996, Penny Pridy took leave from cabinet in order to deal with her breast cancer treatment. Dan Miller was named acting minister of small business, tourism and culture during her recovery. She returned to cabinet in September.

On September 23, 1996, Clark announced the establishment of a new ministry of children and families, splitting off the responsibility from the ministry of human resources. Priddy was named the inaugural minister of children and families, and Dennis Steifel remained minister of the renamed ministry of human resources, now only responsible for managing income assistance. Backbencher Jan Pullinger was named to Priddy's old role as minister of small business, tourism and culture.

On December 12, 1996, Sihota stepped down from cabinet due to two separate conflict of interest investigations. MacPhail took over his portfolios in an acting capacity. On January 6, 1997, Clark made a mini-shuffle to fill the gap. Paul Ramsey and John Cashore took Sihota's roles as minister of education and minister of labour, respectively, with Cashore also keeping his role as minister of aboriginal affairs. Two new ministers joined cabinet: Cathy McGregor, who took over Ramsey's newly-vacated environment portfolio; and Mike Farnworth, who became minister of municipal affairs and housing, taking it out of Miller's jurisdiction. The shuffle drew criticism from the Mayor of Victoria, Bob Cross, as it reduced Victoria's presence in cabinet to one (Andrew Petter); by comparison, under Harcourt, the city had four ministers. Clark, however, said regional considerations were behind the appointments, as McGregor became the second member of cabinet from the Interior region.

Clark made his first major cabinet shuffle on February 18, 1998. All but four ministers — Dosanjh, Ramsey, Zirnhelt and Evans — were either moved to a new portfolio or had their existing one reconfigured. Two new ministries, advanced education and fisheries, were created. MacPhail was named the new finance minister, replacing Petter. The size of cabinet expanded to 19 with the addition of four new ministers: Jenny Kwan, Harry Lali, Dale Lovick and Ian Waddell. Lovick's appointment made him the third minister from Vancouver Island; as he represented the riding of Nanaimo and Pullinger represented Cowichan-Ladysmith, the Victoria-based paper the Times Colonist suggested that the "Vancouver Island power base moved to the mid-island". The new cabinet made two firsts in B.C. political history: Jenny Kwan became the first Chinese-Canadian cabinet minister, and Lovick and Pullinger became the first married couple to be in cabinet together.

On October 20, 1998, Sihota returned to cabinet. He was named minister responsible for the Public Service, a new role that Clark said would co-ordinate all government activities and initiatives aimed at boosting the province's economy.

On January 29, 1999, Gordon Wilson, leader of the Progressive Democratic Alliance and former leader of the Liberal Party, crossed the floor to join the NDP. He was appointed to cabinet as minister responsible for the B.C. Ferry Corporation and as minister of aboriginal affairs. Dan Miller, previously responsible for the B.C. Ferry Corp., remained deputy premier and minister of energy; Lovick, previously minister of aboriginal affairs, remained minister of labour, and additionally gained responsibility for the Insurance Corporation of British Columbia.

On July 16, 1999, finance minister Joy MacPhail resigned from cabinet, citing "personal reasons … not family reasons". Reporter Judith Lavoie suggested it "mark[ed] the first major, public crack in the solidarity of the beleaguered NDP government." Wilson was appointed finance minister to replace her. Five days later, on July 22, Clark announced a major shuffle of his cabinet. Two new ministries were created: the ministry of social development and economic security, headed by Sihota; and the ministry of community development co-operatives and volunteers, headed by Pullinger. Four new ministers — Jim Doyle, Helmut Giesbrecht, Joan Sawicki and Joan Smallwood — joined cabinet, and one, Cathy McGregor was removed. The shuffle was widely perceived as an attempt by Clark to shore up support: Judith Lavoie of the Times Colonist suggested that Clark's renewed attention on environment and poverty was an appeal to the party's left-wing base, while Michael Smythe of The Province characterized the shuffle as "silenc[ing] dissdent, reward[ing] loyalists".
