= Miller ministry =

Miller ministry could refer to:

- Miller ministry (British Columbia), the British Columbia, Canada, government led by Dan Miller from 1999 to 2000
- Miller ministry (Ontario), the Ontario, Canada, government led by Frank Miller in 1985
