= Ministry of Health (British Columbia) =

Canadian provincial government department

British Columbia Ministry of Health
Ministry overview
- Jurisdiction: British Columbia
- Headquarters: Victoria, British Columbia
- Annual budget: C$35.144 billion (2025–26)
- Ministers responsible: Ryan Peterson, Minister of Health; Cynthia Johansen, Deputy minister
- Ministry executives: Tiffany Ma and Diana Clarke, Associate Deputy Ministers; Bonnie Henry, Provincial Health Officer
- Website: Official website

The Ministry of Health is a department of the Government of British Columbia which oversees the provincial health care system. It manages services including the Medical Services Plan, HealthLinkBC, PharmaCare, and the BC Vital Statistics Agency.

The majority of health services are delivered through partnerships with health authorities, physicians and other health professionals. The ministry works with five regional health authorities (Fraser Health, Interior Health, Island Health, Northern Health and Vancouver Coastal Health) and one province-wide health authority, the Provincial Health Services Authority, which is responsible for specialized health services. It also supports the role of the Provincial Health Officer, whose office is housed within the ministry.

Ryan Peterson (politician) has been the Minister of Health since November 20, 2026.

As of 2025, the Deputy Minister of Health is Cynthia Johansen. The Associate Deputy Ministers are Tiffany Ma and Diana Clarke. An earlier acting appointment of Alexandra Faye (Ally) Butler as Associate Deputy Minister was rescinded in April 2025.

== History ==
On February 21, 1946, the government announced plans to establish a separate department for health; until then, health policy had been the purview of the provincial secretary. The Department of Health and Welfare was formally established on October 1, 1946, with George Pearson as the inaugural minister.

During the first term of the Gordon Campbell government, a separate Ministry of Health Planning was created (led by Sindi Hawkins) but that ministry was later merged back into the main ministry. During the same period, there were also two ministers of state: one for seniors and another for mental health and addictions.

Under John Horgan, a separate Ministry of Mental Health and Addictions was established. Following the 2024 provincial election, Premier David Eby’s administration ended the stand-alone ministry and folded it back into the Ministry of Health. The 2025/26 Estimates show the "Mental Health and Addictions (Disestablished)" vote with funds transferred to Health in November 2024.

=== COVID-19 and public health ===
On April 30, 2020, the Ministry published guidance alongside the BC Centre for Disease Control on interpreting PCR test results for COVID-19. On Sept. 12, 2024 the Provincial Health Officer rescinded the COVID-19 public-health emergency orders. On March 28, 2025 the PHO declared the end of the 2024–25 respiratory illness season and lifted temporary measures in health-care settings.

=== Professional regulation modernization ===
On October 19, 2022, Minister Adrian Dix introduced the Health Professions and Occupations Act (HPOA), which received Royal Assent on Nov. 24, 2022. Specific sections came into force on Oct. 18, 2023 to establish the Health Professions and Occupations Regulatory Oversight Office, headed by a Superintendent appointed in June 2024. As part of ongoing amalgamations under the modernization initiative, several health regulatory colleges were amalgamated effective June 28, 2024. The HPOA is scheduled to come into force on April 1, 2026, replacing the Health Professions Act.

=== List of ministers ===
List of ministers
Minister	Term start	Term end	Political party	Cabinet
Minister of Health and Welfare
George Sharratt Pearson	October 1, 1946	December 29, 1947	█ Liberal	Hart
George Sharratt Pearson	December 29, 1947	May 3, 1950	█ Liberal	Johnson
Alexander Douglas Turnbull	May 3, 1950	August 1, 1952	█ Liberal	Johnson
Eric Martin	August 1, 1952	March 20, 1959	█ Social Credit	W. A. C. Bennett
Minister of Health Services and Hospital Insurance
Eric Martin	March 20, 1959	December 12, 1966	█ Social Credit	W. A. C. Bennett
Wesley Black	December 12, 1966	May 24, 1968	█ Social Credit	W. A. C. Bennett
Ralph Loffmark	May 24, 1968	September 15, 1972	█ Social Credit	W. A. C. Bennett
Dennis Cocke	September 15, 1972	November 7, 1973	█ New Democratic	Barrett
Minister of Health
Dennis Cocke	November 7, 1973	December 22, 1975	█ New Democratic	Barrett
Robert McClelland	December 22, 1975	November 24, 1979	█ Social Credit	B. Bennett
Rafe Mair	November 24, 1979	January 6, 1981	█ Social Credit	B. Bennett
Jim Nielsen	January 6, 1981	February 11, 1986	█ Social Credit	B. Bennett
Stephen Rogers	February 11, 1986	April 3, 1986	█ Social Credit	B. Bennett
Jim Nielsen	April 3, 1986	August 6, 1986	█ Social Credit	B. Bennett
Jim Nielsen	August 6, 1986	November 6, 1986	█ Social Credit	Vander Zalm
Peter Dueck	November 6, 1986	November 1, 1989	█ Social Credit	Vander Zalm
John Jansen	November 1, 1989	April 2, 1991	█ Social Credit	Vander Zalm
John Jansen	April 2, 1991	May 7, 1991	█ Social Credit	Johnston
Bruce Strachan	May 7, 1991	November 5, 1991	█ Social Credit	Johnston
Elizabeth Cull	November 5, 1991	September 15, 1993	█ New Democratic	Harcourt
Paul Ramsey	September 15, 1993	February 28, 1996	█ New Democratic	Harcourt
Andrew Petter	February 28, 1996	June 17, 1996	█ New Democratic	G. Clark
Joy MacPhail	June 17, 1996	February 18, 1998	█ New Democratic	G. Clark
Penny Priddy	February 18, 1998	August 25, 1999	█ New Democratic	G. Clark
Penny Priddy	August 25, 1999	February 24, 2000	█ New Democratic	Miller
Mike Farnworth	February 29, 2000	November 1, 2000	█ New Democratic	Dosanjh
Corky Evans	November 1, 2000	June 5, 2001	█ New Democratic	Dosanjh
Minister of Health Services
Colin Hansen	June 5, 2001	December 15, 2004	█ Liberal	Campbell
Shirley Bond	December 15, 2004	June 16, 2005	█ Liberal	Campbell
Minister of Health
George Abbott	June 16, 2005	June 23, 2008	█ Liberal	Campbell
Minister of Health Services
George Abbott	June 23, 2008	June 10, 2009	█ Liberal	Campbell
Kevin Falcon	June 10, 2009	November 30, 2010	█ Liberal	Campbell
Colin Hansen	November 30, 2010	March 14, 2011	█ Liberal	Campbell
Minister of Health
Mike de Jong	March 14, 2011	September 5, 2012	█ Liberal	C. Clark
Margaret MacDiarmid	September 5, 2012	June 10, 2013	█ Liberal	C. Clark
Terry Lake	June 10, 2013	June 12, 2017	█ Liberal	C. Clark
Mary Polak	June 12, 2017	July 18, 2017	█ Liberal	C. Clark
Adrian Dix	July 18, 2017	November 18, 2022	█ New Democratic	Horgan
Adrian Dix	November 18, 2022	November 18, 2024	█ New Democratic	Eby
Josie Osborne	November 18, 2024	August 14, 2026	█ New Democratic	Eby
Ravi Kahlon	August 14, 2026		█ New Democratic	Eby
Ryan Peterson	November 20, 2026		█ Conservative	Doerkson

== See also ==
- E-Comm, 9-1-1 call and dispatch centre for Southwestern BC
