= Christy Clark ministry =

Cabinet of British Columbia, 2011–2017

- 35th ministry of British Columbia

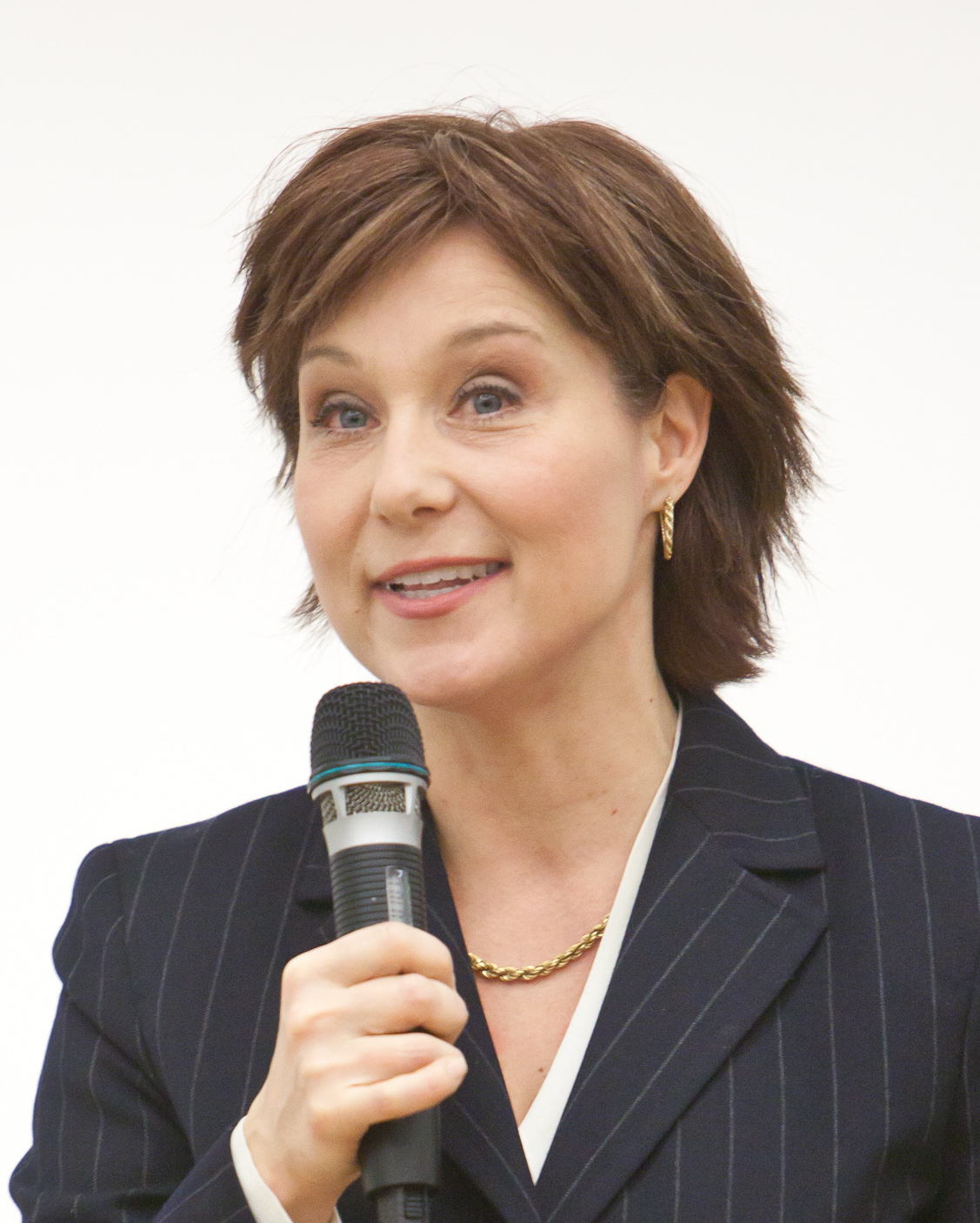
- Christy Clark in 2011
- Date formed: March 14, 2011
- Date dissolved: July 18, 2017

People and organisations
- Monarch: Elizabeth II
- Lieutenant Governor: Steven Point (2011–2012); Judith Guichon (2012–2017)
- Premier: Christy Clark
- Deputy Premier: Kevin Falcon (2011–2012); Rich Coleman (2012–2017)
- Member party: Liberal Party
- Status in legislature: Majority (2011–2017); Minority (2017–2017)
- Opposition cabinet: 40th (2013–2017)
- Opposition party: New Democratic Party
- Opposition leader: Dawn Black (2011–2011); Adrian Dix (2011–2014); John Horgan (2014–2017)

History
- Incoming formation: 2011 Liberal leadership election
- Outgoing formation: 2017 motion of no confidence
- Elections: 2013, 2017
- Legislature terms: 39th Parliament of British Columbia; 40th Parliament of British Columbia; 41st Parliament of British Columbia
- Predecessor: Campbell ministry
- Successor: Horgan ministry

The Christy Clark ministry was the combined Cabinet (formally the Executive Council of British Columbia) that governed British Columbia from March 14, 2011, to July 18, 2017. It was led by Christy Clark, the 35th premier of British Columbia, and consisted of members of the British Columbia Liberal Party.

The ministry replaced the Campbell ministry when Gordon Campbell stepped down as premier during the 39th Parliament of British Columbia and was replaced as premier by Clark. It maintained power in the 40th Parliament of British Columbia after the 2013 general election. After the 2017 general election resulted in a hung parliament, it attempted to stay in power as a minority government but fell less than two months later as a result of a successful non-confidence motion on June 29, 2017. It was replaced by the Horgan ministry.

== List of ministers ==
Portfolio	Minister	Tenure
Premier of British Columbia	Christy Clark	March 14, 2011 – July 18, 2017
Deputy Premier of British Columbia	Kevin Falcon	March 14, 2011 – August 29, 2012
Deputy Premier of British Columbia	vacant	August 29, 2012 – September 5, 2012
Deputy Premier of British Columbia	Rich Coleman	September 5, 2012 – July 18, 2017
Minister of Aboriginal Relations and Reconciliation	Mary Polak	March 14, 2011 – September 5, 2012
Minister of Aboriginal Relations and Reconciliation	Ida Chong	September 5, 2012 – June 10, 2013
Minister of Aboriginal Relations and Reconciliation	John Rustad	June 10, 2013 – July 18, 2017
Minister of Advanced Education	Naomi Yamamoto	March 14, 2011 – September 5, 2012
Minister of Advanced Education	John Yap	September 5, 2012 – March 4, 2013
Minister of Advanced Education	Ralph Sultan	March 4, 2013 – June 10, 2013
Minister of Advanced Education	Amrik Virk	June 10, 2013 – December 18, 2014
Minister of Advanced Education	Andrew Wilkinson	December 18, 2014 – June 12, 2017
Minister of Advanced Education	Linda Reid	June 12, 2017 – July 18, 2017
Minister of Agriculture	Don McRae	March 14, 2011 – September 5, 2012
Minister of Agriculture	Norm Letnick	September 5, 2012 – June 10, 2013
Minister of Agriculture	Pat Pimm	June 10, 2013 – April 11, 2014
Minister of Agriculture	Norm Letnick	April 11, 2014 – July 18, 2017
Minister of Children and Family Development	Mary McNeil	March 14, 2011 – September 5, 2012
Minister of Children and Family Development	Stephanie Cadieux	September 5, 2012 – July 18, 2017
Minister of Citizens' Services and Open Government	Ben Stewart	September 5, 2012 – June 10, 2013
Minister of Community, Sport and Cultural Development	Ida Chong	March 14, 2011 – September 5, 2012
Minister of Community, Sport and Cultural Development	Bill Bennett	September 5, 2012 – June 10, 2013
Minister of Community, Sport and Cultural Development	Coralee Oakes	June 10, 2013 – July 30, 2015
Minister of Community, Sport and Cultural Development	Peter Fassbender	July 30, 2015 – June 12, 2017
Minister of Community, Sport and Cultural Development	Sam Sullivan	June 12, 2017 – July 18, 2017
Minister of Education	George Abbott	March 14, 2011 – September 5, 2012
Minister of Education	Don McRae	September 5, 2012 – June 10, 2013
Minister of Education	Peter Fassbender	June 10, 2013 – July 30, 2015
Minister of Education	Mike Bernier	July 30, 2015 – July 18, 2017
Minister of Energy and Mines	Rich Coleman	March 14, 2011 – June 10, 2013
Minister of Energy and Mines	Bill Bennett	June 10, 2013 – June 12, 2017
Minister of Energy and Mines	Rich Coleman	June 12, 2017 – July 18, 2017
Minister of Environment	Terry Lake	March 14, 2011 – June 10, 2013
Minister of Environment	Mary Polak	June 10, 2013 – June 12, 2017
Minister of Environment	Jordan Sturdy	June 12, 2017 – July 18, 2017
Minister of Finance	Kevin Falcon	March 14, 2011 – August 29, 2012
Minister of Finance	Shirley Bond	August 29, 2012 – September 5, 2012
Minister of Finance	Mike de Jong	September 5, 2012 – July 18, 2017
Minister of Forests, Lands and Natural Resource Operations	Steve Thomson	March 14, 2011 – June 22, 2017
Minister of Forests, Lands and Natural Resource Operations	John Rustad	June 22, 2017 – July 18, 2017
Minister of Health	Mike de Jong	March 14, 2011 – September 5, 2012
Minister of Health	Margaret MacDiarmid	September 5, 2012 – June 10, 2013
Minister of Health	Terry Lake	June 10, 2013 – June 12, 2017
Minister of Health	Mary Polak	June 12, 2017 – July 18, 2017
Minister responsible for Housing	Rich Coleman	March 14, 2011 – June 12, 2017
Minister responsible for Housing	Ellis Ross	June 12, 2017 – July 18, 2017
Minister of International Trade (and Asia Pacific Strategy)	Teresa Wat	June 10, 2013 – July 18, 2017
Minister of Jobs, Tourism and Skills Training	Pat Bell	March 14, 2011 – June 10, 2013
Minister of Jobs, Tourism and Skills Training	Shirley Bond	June 10, 2013 – July 18, 2017
Minister of Justice and Attorney General (Note: "Attorney General" from March 14, 2011 to February 2, 2012)	Barry Penner	March 14, 2011 – August 18, 2011
Minister of Justice and Attorney General	Shirley Bond	August 18, 2011 – June 10, 2013
Minister of Justice and Attorney General	Suzanne Anton	June 10, 2013 – June 12, 2017
Minister of Justice and Attorney General	Andrew Wilkinson	June 12, 2017 – July 18, 2017
Minister of Labour, Citizens' Services and Open Government	Stephanie Cadieux	March 14, 2011 – September 26, 2011
Minister of Labour, Citizens' Services and Open Government	Margaret MacDiarmid	September 26, 2011 – September 5, 2012
Minister responsible for Labour	Pat Bell	September 5, 2012 – June 10, 2013
Minister responsible for Labour	Shirley Bond	June 10, 2013 – July 18, 2017
Minister of State for Multiculturalism	Harry Bloy	March 14, 2011 – March 16, 2012
Minister of State for Multiculturalism	John Yap	March 24, 2012 – September 5, 2012
Minister responsible for Multiculturalism	Harry Bloy	March 14, 2011 – September 26, 2011
Minister responsible for Multiculturalism	John Yap	September 5, 2012 – March 4, 2013
Minister responsible for Multiculturalism	Ralph Sultan	March 4, 2013 – March 21, 2013
Minister responsible for Multiculturalism	Mike de Jong	March 21, 2013 – June 10, 2017
Minister responsible for Multiculturalism	Teresa Wat	June 10, 2013 – July 18, 2017
Minister of Natural Gas Development	Rich Coleman	June 10, 2013 – June 12, 2017
Minister of Natural Gas Development	Ellis Ross	June 12, 2017 – July 18, 2017
Minister of Public Safety and Solicitor General	Shirley Bond	March 14, 2011 – February 8, 2012
Minister of Public Safety and Solicitor General	Mike Morris	December 11, 2015 – July 18, 2017
Minister of State for Rural Economic Development	Donna Barnett	October 21, 2015 – July 18, 2017
Minister of State for Seniors	Ralph Sultan	September 5, 2012 – June 10, 2013
Minister of State for Small Business	Naomi Yamamoto	September 5, 2012 – June 10, 2013
Minister of State for Small Business	Coralee Oakes	July 30, 2015 – July 18, 2017
Minister of Social Development	Harry Bloy	March 14, 2011 – September 26, 2011
Minister of Social Development	Stephanie Cadieux	September 26, 2011 – September 5, 2012
Minister of Social Development	Moira Stilwell	September 5, 2012 – June 10, 2013
Minister of Social Development	Don McRae	June 10, 2013 – February 2, 2015
Minister of Social Development	Michelle Stilwell	February 2, 2015 – July 18, 2017
Minister of Technology, Innovation and Citizens' Services	Andrew Wilkinson	June 10, 2013 – December 18, 2014
Minister of Technology, Innovation and Citizens' Services	Amrik Virk	December 18, 2014 – June 12, 2017
Minister of Technology, Innovation and Citizens' Services	Jas Johal	June 12, 2017 – July 18, 2017
Minister of State for Tourism and Small Business	Naomi Yamamoto	June 10, 2013 – July 30, 2015
Minister responsible for TransLink	Peter Fassbender	July 30, 2015 – June 12, 2017
Minister responsible for TransLink	Sam Sullivan	June 12, 2017 – July 18, 2017
Minister of Transportation and Infrastructure	Blair Lekstrom	March 14, 2011 – September 5, 2012
Minister of Transportation and Infrastructure	Mary Polak	September 5, 2012 – June 10, 2013
Minister of Transportation and Infrastructure	Todd Stone	June 10, 2013 – July 18, 2017

== Cabinet shuffles ==
On August 18, 2011, Barry Penner stepped down as attorney general after announcing his impending retirement from politics. Shirley Bond was appointed to replace him, holding dual roles as attorney general and solicitor general.

Clark first shuffled her cabinet on September 26, 2011, demoting Harry Bloy from Minister of Social Development to Minister of State for Multiculturalism, and moving Stephanie Cadieux into Bloy's old portfolio and Margaret MacDiarmid into Cadieux's.

Clark initiated her first major shuffle on September 5, 2012. The shuffle was prompted by several veteran Liberals deciding not to seek election in the then-upcoming 2013 election. Among the ministers departing were Kevin Falcon and George Abbott, while those taking on new portfolios included Rich Coleman (deputy premier) and Mike de Jong (finance).

Following the ministry's re-election in the 2013 election, Clark again shuffled her cabinet. The 19-member cabinet consisted of nine members who were already in cabinet, seven newly elected members, and two prior-elected members from the backbenches. Among those joining were Suzanne Anton (justice) and Peter Fassbender (education). Coleman, in addition to retaining his position as deputy premier, took the additional role as Minister of Housing and the first Minister of Natural Gas Development. Columnist Keith Baldry noted that many of the ministries that receive the most media attention and coverage would be helmed by new ministers, allowing the government to present a "fresh face" and move on from the Campbell era.

Following the 2017 election, on June 12, Clark appointed a new cabinet. The shuffle was prompted, in part, by the defeat of five ministers in the election and the retirement of a sixth. Five rookie ministers joined cabinet, including Ellis Ross, BC's first elected indigenous cabinet minister with a portfolio. (Note: Ross was the third indigenous cabinet minister overall, after Frank Calder and Edward John. Calder was a minister without portfolio in the Barrett ministry from 1972 to 1973. John was the minister of children and families in the Dosanjh ministry from 2000 to 2001; however, John was not a member of the legislature.) Several existing ministers were shuffled to different portfolios; Clark downplayed the changes, describing the government as being in "caretaker mode" and that it wouldn't pursue any new policies, but added "the team reflects the results of listening to what voters told us in the last election."
