= Deputy Premier of British Columbia =

- Incumbent; Claire Rattée since November 20, 2026
- Status: Deputy head of government
- Member of: Cabinet; Legislative Assembly
- Reports to: Premier; Legislative Assembly
- Seat: Victoria, British Columbia
- Nominator: Premier
- Appointer: Lieutenant governor
- Term length: At His Majesty's pleasure
- Formation: September 15, 1972
- First holder: Eileen Dailly
- Salary: CA$59,766.37 (Note: This number does not include the base salary received by all BC MLAs.)

The deputy premier of British Columbia is the representative of the premier of British Columbia in the Canadian province of British Columbia when the current premier is unable to attend functions executed by the premier.

Claire Rattée has been the deputy premier since November 20, 2026.

Although the position was only formally established in 1972, many MLAs have served as de facto deputy premiers or acting premiers prior to 1972. This includes John Robson, who served as acting premier in 1888 when Alexander Edmund Batson Davie was ill, as well as Royal Maitland and Herbert Anscomb, who were the Progressive Conservative Party leaders during the coalition governments of John Hart and Boss Johnson from 1941 to 1952.

== Deputy premiers of British Columbia ==
No.	Name	Time in office		Party	Ministry	Constituency	Notes
1	Eileen Dailly	September 26, 1972	December 22, 1975	█ New Democratic	Barrett	Burnaby North	
2	Grace McCarthy	December 22, 1975	May 26, 1983	█ Social Credit	B. Bennett	Vancouver-Little Mountain	
–	Vacant	May 26, 1983	August 6, 1986	–	B. Bennett	–	
–	Vacant	August 6, 1986	August 14, 1986	–	Vander Zalm	–	
(2)	Grace McCarthy	August 14, 1986	November 6, 1986	█ Social Credit	Vander Zalm	Vancouver-Little Mountain	
–	Vacant	November 6, 1986	August 8, 1990	–	Vander Zalm	–	
3	Rita Johnston	August 8, 1990	April 2, 1991	█ Social Credit	Vander Zalm	Surrey-Newton	
–	Vacant	April 2, 1991	November 5, 1991	–	Johnston	–	
4	Anita Hagen	November 5, 1991	September 15, 1993	█ New Democratic	Harcourt	New Westminster	
5	Elizabeth Cull	September 15, 1993	February 22, 1996	█ New Democratic	Harcourt	Oak Bay-Gordon Head	
6	Dan Miller	February 28, 1996	August 25, 1999	█ New Democratic	G. Clark	North Coast	
7	Lois Boone	August 25, 1999	February 24, 2000	█ New Democratic	Miller	Prince George-Mount Robson	
8	Joy MacPhail	February 29, 2000	June 5, 2001	█ New Democratic	Dosanjh	Vancouver-Hastings	
9	Christy Clark	June 5, 2001	September 20, 2004	█ Liberal	Campbell	Port Moody-Westwood	
10	Shirley Bond	December 15, 2004	June 10, 2009	█ Liberal	Campbell	Prince George-Mount Robson	
11	Colin Hansen	June 10, 2009	March 14, 2011	█ Liberal	Campbell	Vancouver-Quilchena	
12	Kevin Falcon	March 14, 2011	August 29, 2012	█ Liberal	C. Clark	Surrey-Cloverdale	
13	Rich Coleman	September 5, 2012	July 18, 2017	█ Liberal	C. Clark	Fort Langley-Aldergrove Langley East	
14	Carole James	July 18, 2017	November 26, 2020	█ New Democratic	Horgan	Victoria-Beacon Hill	
–	Vacant	November 26, 2020	October 28, 2021	–	Horgan	–	
15	Mike Farnworth	October 28, 2021	November 18, 2024	█ New Democratic	Horgan	Port Coquitlam	
15	Mike Farnworth	October 28, 2021	November 18, 2024	█ New Democratic	Eby	Port Coquitlam	
16	Niki Sharma	November 18, 2024	November 20, 2026	█ New Democratic	Eby	Vancouver-Hastings	
17	Claire Rattée	November 20, 2026	Incumbent	█ Conservative	Doerkson	Skeena	

== See also ==
- Premier (Canada)
