= Joy MacPhail =

Canadian politician

Joy MacPhail CM OBC
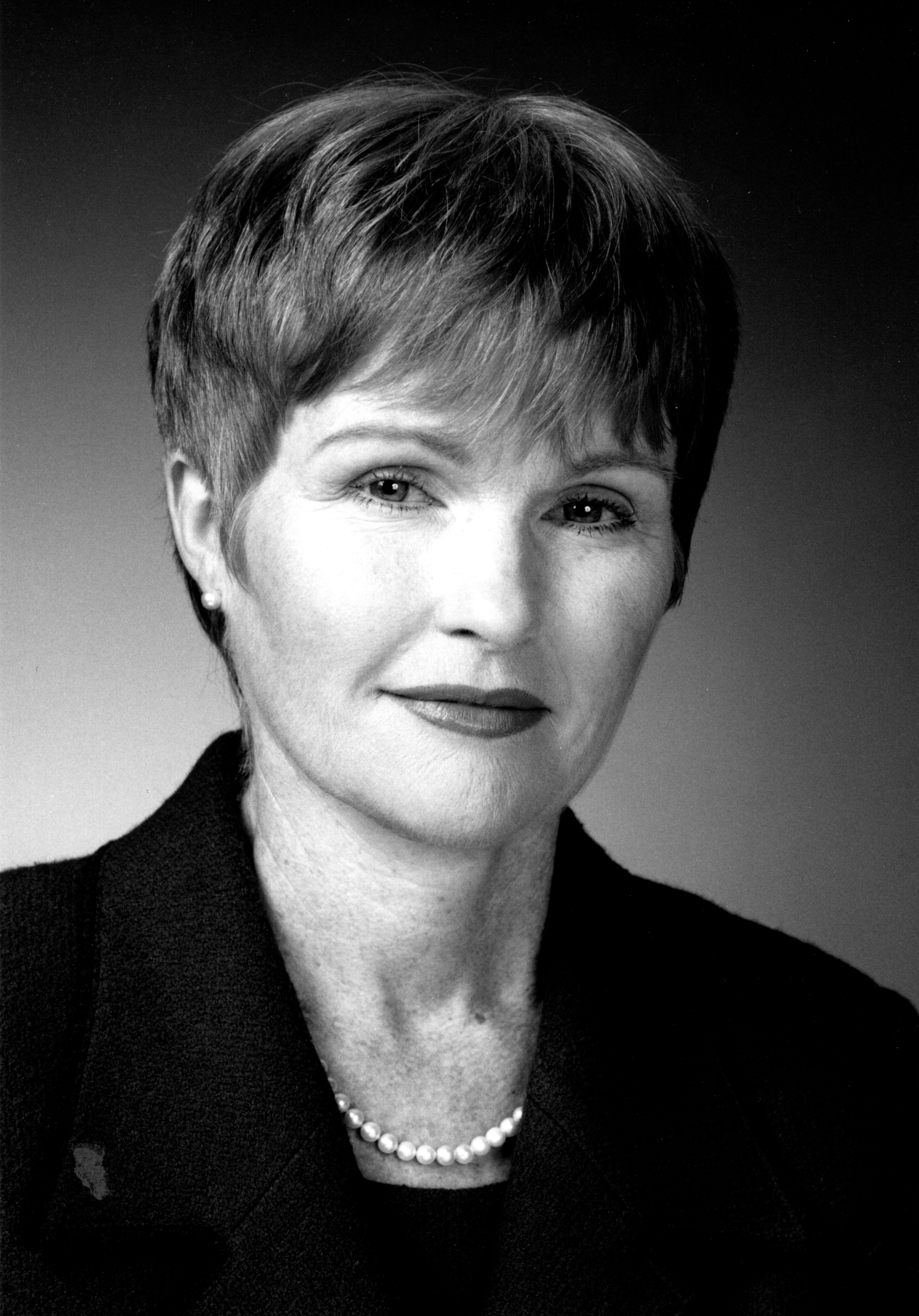

Leader of the Opposition of British Columbia
- In office June 16, 2001 – May 17, 2005
- Preceded by: Gordon Campbell
- Succeeded by: Carole James

Member of the British Columbia Legislative Assembly for Vancouver-Hastings
- In office October 17, 1991 – May 17, 2005
- Preceded by: Riding established
- Succeeded by: Shane Simpson

Interim Leader of the British Columbia New Democratic Party
- In office May 16, 2001 – November 23, 2003
- Preceded by: Ujjal Dosanjh
- Succeeded by: Carole James

Minister of Social Services of British Columbia
- In office September 15, 1993 – June 17, 1996
- Premier: Michael Harcourt; Glen Clark
- Preceded by: Joan Smallwood
- Succeeded by: Dennis Streifel

Minister of Health & Minister Responsible for Seniors of British Columbia
- In office June 17, 1996 – February 18, 1998
- Premier: Glen Clark
- Preceded by: Andrew Petter
- Succeeded by: Penny Priddy

Minister of Education, Skills and Training of British Columbia
- In office December 12, 1996 – January 6, 1997
- Premier: Glen Clark
- Preceded by: Moe Sihota
- Succeeded by: Paul Ramsey

Minister of Labour of British Columbia
- In office December 12, 1996 – January 6, 1997
- Premier: Glen Clark
- Preceded by: Moe Sihota
- Succeeded by: John Cashore

Minister of Finance and Corporate Relations of British Columbia
- In office February 18, 1998 – July 16, 1999
- Premier: Glen Clark
- Preceded by: Andrew Petter
- Succeeded by: Gordon Wilson

8th Deputy Premier of British Columbia
- In office February 29, 2000 – June 5, 2001
- Premier: Ujjal Dosanjh
- Preceded by: Lois Boone
- Succeeded by: Christy Clark

Minister of Labour of British Columbia
- In office February 29, 2000 – November 1, 2000
- Premier: Ujjal Dosanjh
- Preceded by: Joan Smallwood
- Succeeded by: Joan Smallwood

Minister of Education of British Columbia
- In office November 1, 2000 – June 5, 2001
- Premier: Ujjal Dosanjh
- Preceded by: Penny Priddy
- Succeeded by: Christy Clark

Personal details
- Born: March 6, 1952 (age 74) Hamilton, Ontario, Canada
- Party: New Democratic
- Spouse: James Shavick

Joy Kathryn MacPhail CM OBC (born March 6, 1952) is a former Canadian politician in British Columbia. A longtime member of the British Columbia New Democratic Party, she served as a member of the Legislative Assembly (MLA) from 1991 to 2005 and as a Minister of the Crown from 1993 to 1999, and 2000–2001 including as Deputy Premier.

== Background ==
MacPhail was born in Hamilton, Ontario. After studying economics at the University of Western Ontario, MacPhail earned a [diploma] in Labour Studies at the London School of Economics.

Prior to her election, MacPhail was a spokesperson for the B.C. Federation of Labour and an executive assistant to the Federation's then-president, Ken Georgetti.

== Political career ==
=== MLA and Minister ===
MacPhail was first elected to the British Columbia Legislature in 1991 as the MLA for Vancouver-Hastings and served in the cabinets of three NDP premiers.

Under Premier Mike Harcourt, she served as Minister of Social Services from 1993 to 1996. Under Premier Glen Clark, she briefly remained Minister of Social Services, before a cabinet shuffle moved MacPhail into the position of Minister of Health from 1996 to 1998. MacPhail's final cabinet position in the Clark government was as Minister of Finance from 1998 to her departure in 1999, leaving Clark's cabinet at a time when it was suffering from increasing dissent and scandal.

As Finance Minister, MacPhail was tasked with delivering a deficit budget in the aftermath of the 1997 Asian financial crisis, which caused a brief recession in British Columbia. MacPhail and the NDP opted for a Keynesian approach to the recession, investing in major construction projects like the Vancouver Trade and Convention Centre and investment in the SkyTrain network, all of which were criticized by then-opposition leader Gordon Campbell.

=== Bid for party leadership ===
Upon Clark's resignation as NDP leader, MacPhail ran for the party's leadership. MacPhail was characterized in the media as a centrist, promising a Tony Blair-style move to the Third Way and a focus on tax cuts and balanced budgets.

As fellow contender Ujjal Dosanjh consolidated more support, MacPhail withdrew from the race, throwing her support behind Dosanjh to prevent a victory by the Clark-endorsed Gordon Wilson, who was serving as Minister of Education at the time. Wilson, who had jumped from the British Columbia Liberals to the Progressive Democratic Alliance before joining the NDP, would eventually withdraw from the race and endorse Agriculture Minister Corky Evans, who would lose to Dosanjh on the first ballot. Under Dosanjh, she was the Deputy Premier and served as Minister of Labour and, later, Minister of Education.

=== Final term ===
The NDP suffered a massive electoral blow in the May 16, 2001, provincial election. Only MacPhail and then-Minister of the Environment, Jenny Kwan, retained their seats. MacPhail held onto her seat by 409 votes. Media noted that MacPhail's campaign benefited from controversy surrounding her Green opponent, Ian Gregson, who had written an explicit article for Hustler Magazine in 1997.

Exactly one month after the election, MacPhail was appointed as the party's interim leader. She was a harsh critic of the new BC Liberal premier Gordon Campbell. Although the NDP was the only other party in the legislature, it was four seats short of official party status. Despite this, Assembly speaker Claude Richmond ensured that the NDP was resourced as an opposition party and MacPhail was recognized by the speaker as the leader of the Opposition.

MacPhail stepped down as leader in 2003 and was succeeded by Carole James. She remained as parliamentary leader of the NDP until her retirement from politics after the 2005 election.

In a profile written regarding MacPhail's retirement in 2005, the Canadian Press erroneously reported that MacPhail is the great-granddaughter of Agnes Macphail, the first woman elected to Canada's Parliament and a founder of the Co-operative Commonwealth Federation, when, in fact, the two have no familial relation.

== Post-politics ==
Two months after her retirement from politics, MacPhail married film and television producer James Shavick in California and became a partner in his production firm Shavick Entertainment.

In 2006, MacPhail and Shavick purchased OutTV, a Canadian cable television station focused on programming for the LGBTQ+ community. MacPhail, a long-time advocate for the community, expressed interest in producing or starring in some of the network's programming, stating: "It's exciting, I must tell you. This is very nice next step for me!"

During the 2012 NDP Leadership race, MacPhail endorsed Brian Topp.

In July 2017, once the BC NDP formed the provincial government, MacPhail replaced Barry Penner as chair of Insurance Corporation of British Columbia.

On June 29, 2022 she became chair of the board of directors at BC Ferries.

She received membership in the Order of Canada on December 29, 2021 and was given the Order of British Columbia on August 1, 2022.

MacPhail's term on the BC Ferries Board came to an end on June 25, 2026 after completing two terms. Her appointed was not renewed.
