= Mary McNeil =

Canadian politician

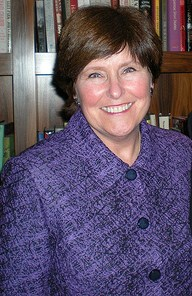

Minister of State for the Olympics and ActNow BC
- In office June 10, 2009 – June 11, 2010

Member of the British Columbia Legislative Assembly for Vancouver-False Creek
- In office May 21, 2009 – May 14, 2013
- Preceded by: Riding established
- Succeeded by: Sam Sullivan

Personal details
- Party: BC Liberal

Mary McNeil is a Canadian politician, who was elected as a BC Liberal Party Member of the Legislative Assembly of British Columbia in the 2009 provincial election, representing the riding of Vancouver-False Creek. She did not seek re-election in the 2013 provincial election.

During her one-term in the Legislature, McNeil was initially appointed Minister of State for the Olympics and ActNow BC. She subsequently served as Minister of Citizens' Services and as Minister of Children and Family Development.

She served as president and CEO of the BC Cancer Foundation for eight years. She has served in key roles for international economic events including the G7 meetings in Halifax and Toronto, APEC in Vancouver and the XI International Conference on AIDS. She also served on the Vancouver Police Board for four years.
