= Dennis Streifel =

Canadian politician and business agent

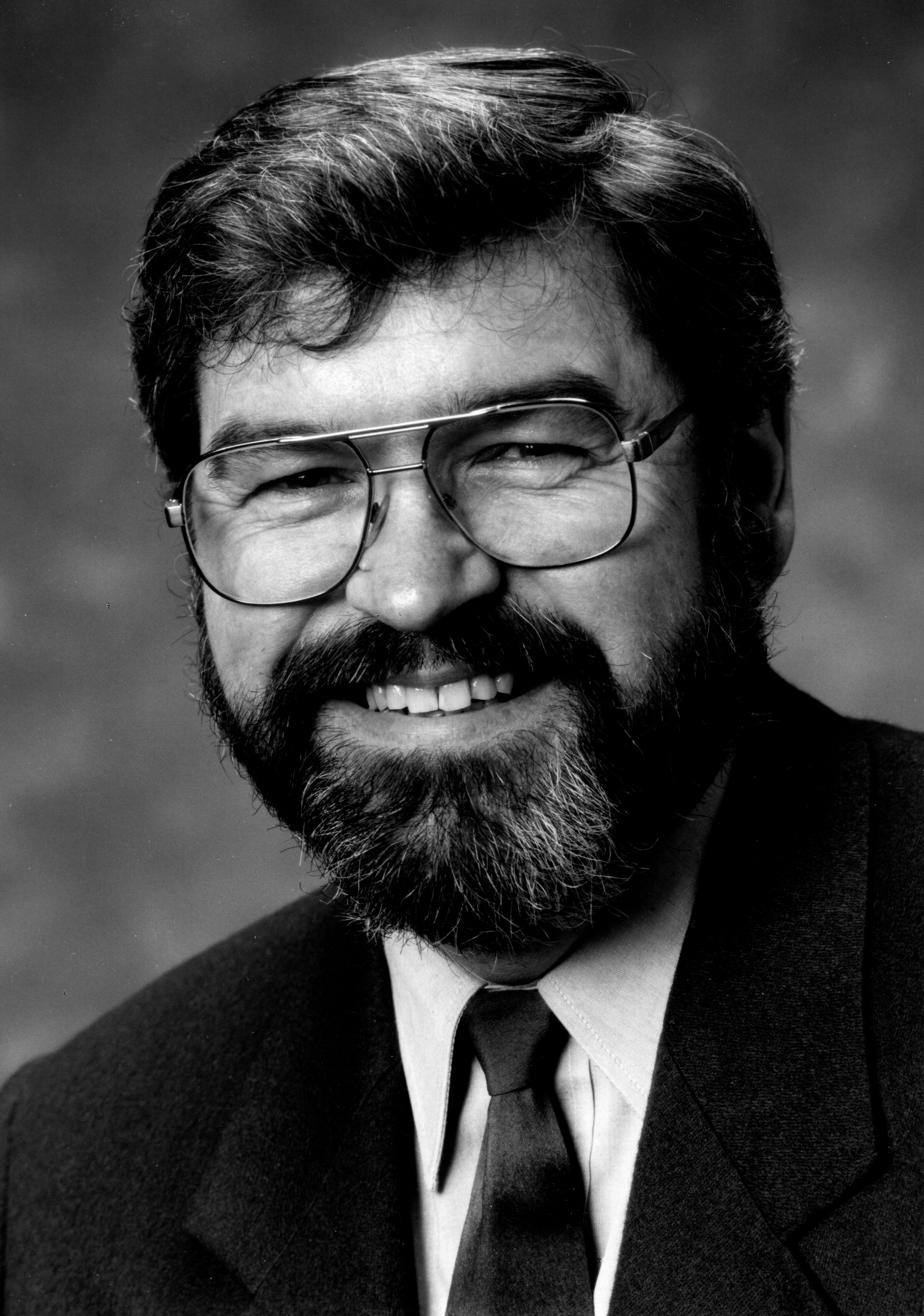

Member of the British Columbia Legislative Assembly for Mission-Kent
- In office October 17, 1991 – May 16, 2001
- Preceded by: Riding Established
- Succeeded by: Randy Hawes

Personal details
- Born: December 8, 1945 (age 80)
- Party: New Democratic

Dennis William Streifel (born 8 December 1945) was a business agent and politician in British Columbia. He represented Mission-Kent in the Legislative Assembly of British Columbia from 1991 to 2001 as a New Democratic Party (NDP) member.

He worked for Canada Safeway and Weldwood of Canada before working with the United Food and Commercial Workers, Local 1518. Streifel served in the provincial cabinet as Minister of Fisheries, as Minister of Human Resources, as Minister of Social Services and as Minister of Forests. From 2000 to 2001, he served as the Deputy Speaker of the Legislature. Streifel did not run for reelection in 2001.
