= Dan Miller (Canadian politician) =

Premier of British Columbia from 1999 to 2000

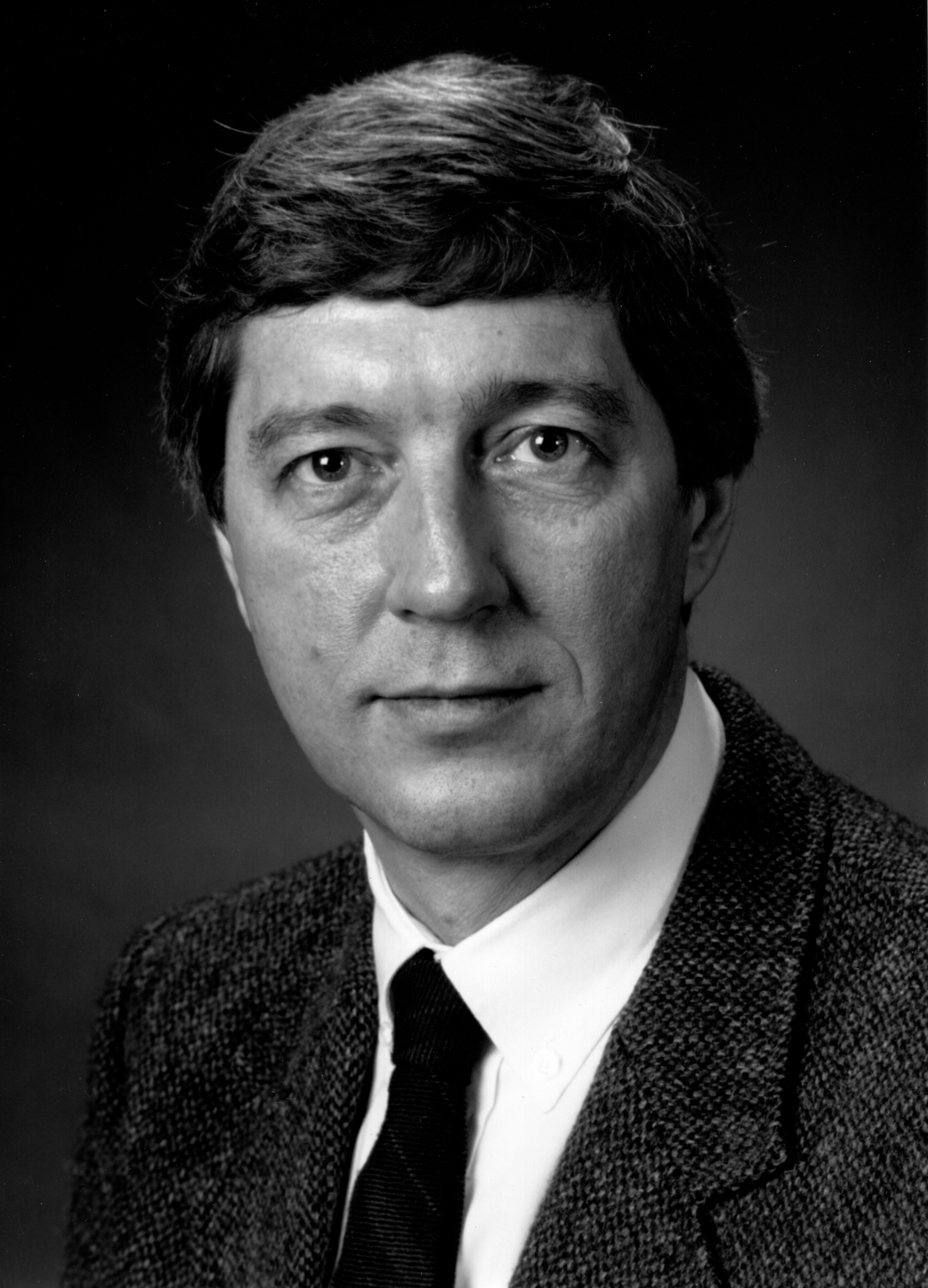
- Miller in 1990

32nd Premier of British Columbia
- In office August 25, 1999 – February 24, 2000
- Monarch: Elizabeth II
- Lieutenant Governor: Garde Gardom
- Deputy: Lois Boone
- Preceded by: Glen Clark
- Succeeded by: Ujjal Dosanjh

Interim Leader of the British Columbia New Democratic Party
- In office August 25, 1999 – February 24, 2000
- Preceded by: Glen Clark
- Succeeded by: Ujjal Dosanjh

6th Deputy Premier of British Columbia
- In office February 28, 1996 – August 25, 1999
- Premier: Glen Clark
- Preceded by: Elizabeth Cull
- Succeeded by: Lois Boone

Member of the British Columbia Legislative Assembly for North Coast Prince Rupert (1986–1991)
- In office October 22, 1986 – May 16, 2001
- Preceded by: Graham Lea
- Succeeded by: Bill Belsey

Personal details
- Born: Arthur Daniel Miller; December 24, 1944 (age 81) Port Alice, British Columbia, Canada
- Party: New Democratic
- Spouse: Gayle Ballard

Arthur Daniel Miller (born December 24, 1944) is a Canadian politician who served as the 32nd premier of British Columbia and interim leader of the BC New Democratic Party for six months from August 25, 1999 to February 24, 2000, following the resignation of Glen Clark.

== Life and career ==
Born in Port Alice, British Columbia, Miller worked as a millwright and a councillor for the city of Prince Rupert. He was first elected to the BC legislature in the 1986 election, representing the riding of Prince Rupert, and served as the BC NDP's forestry critic while that party was in opposition.

He was re-elected to the BC legislature in the 1991 election, representing the new riding of North Coast. With the NDP coming into power, he was appointed minister of forests in the cabinet of Premier Mike Harcourt in November 1991, then served as the Minister of Skills, Training and Labour from September 1993. He was named deputy premier in February 1996 after Glen Clark replaced Harcourt as premier and NDP leader.

After winning re-election in 1996, he continued in his role as deputy premier under Clark until 1999, and variously served as Minister of Municipal Affairs (June 1996–January 1997), Minister of Employment and Investment (January 1997–February 1998) and Minister of Energy and Mines and Minister Responsible for Northern Development (1998–2000).

An uncontroversial and moderate politician, Miller was elected interim leader of the BC NDP by an emergency meeting of the provincial caucus following the sudden resignation of Premier Clark on August 21, 1999. He was sworn in as premier on August 25, and continued in his roles of Minister of Energy and Mines and Minister Responsible for Northern Development. During his brief premiership, Miller's chief of staff was John Horgan, who would become premier in 2017. He was replaced as premier when Ujjal Dosanjh became party leader in February 2000, and he did not run for re-election in the 2001 election.

In 2003, Miller supported Bill Blaikie's bid to become leader of the federal New Democratic Party.

In early 2005, Miller was hired by the BC Government as an advisor for the province's offshore oil and gas development team, and has also worked for a major pipeline company and a forest company since leaving office.

British Columbia provincial government of Ujjal Dosanjh
Cabinet posts (2)
Predecessor	Office	Successor
cont'd from Miller Ministry	Minister of Energy and Mines; February 29, 2000–November 1, 2000	Glenn Robertson
cont'd from Miller Ministry	Minister Responsible for Northern Development; February 29, 2000–November 1, 2000	Paul Ramsey
British Columbia provincial government of Dan Miller
Cabinet posts (3)
Predecessor	Office	Successor
Glen Clark	Premier of British Columbia; August 25, 1999–February 24, 2000	Ujjal Dosanjh
cont'd from Clark Ministry	Minister of Energy and Mines; August 25, 1999–February 24, 2000	cont'd into Dosanjh Ministry
cont'd from Clark Ministry	Minister Responsible for Northern Development; August 25, 1999–February 24, 2000	cont'd into Dosanjh Ministry
British Columbia provincial government of Glen Clark
Cabinet posts (6)
Predecessor	Office	Successor
Elizabeth Cull	Deputy Premier of British Columbia; February 28, 1996–August 25, 1999	Lois Boone
Penny Priddy	Minister of Small Business, Tourism and Culture; June 26, 1996–September 3, 1996	Penny Priddy
Lois Boone	Minister of Municipal Affairs and Housing; June 17, 1996–January 6, 1997	Mike Farnworth
Ministry Established	Minister of Energy and Mines; February 18, 1998–August 25, 1999	cont'd into Miller Ministry
Ministry Established	Minister Responsible for Northern Development; February 18, 1998–August 25, 1999	cont'd into Miller Ministry
Glen Clark	Minister of Employment and Investment; February 28, 1996–February 18, 1998	Mike Farnworth
British Columbia provincial government of Mike Harcourt
Cabinet posts (2)
Predecessor	Office	Successor
Ministry Established	Minister of Skills, Training and Labour; September 15, 1993–February 22, 1996	Paul Ramsey
Claude Richmond; Art Charbonneau	Minister of Forests; November 5, 1991–September 17, 1992; December 16, 1992–September 15, 1993	Art Charbonneau; Andrew Petter
