= Glen Clark =

Premier of British Columbia from 1996 to 1999

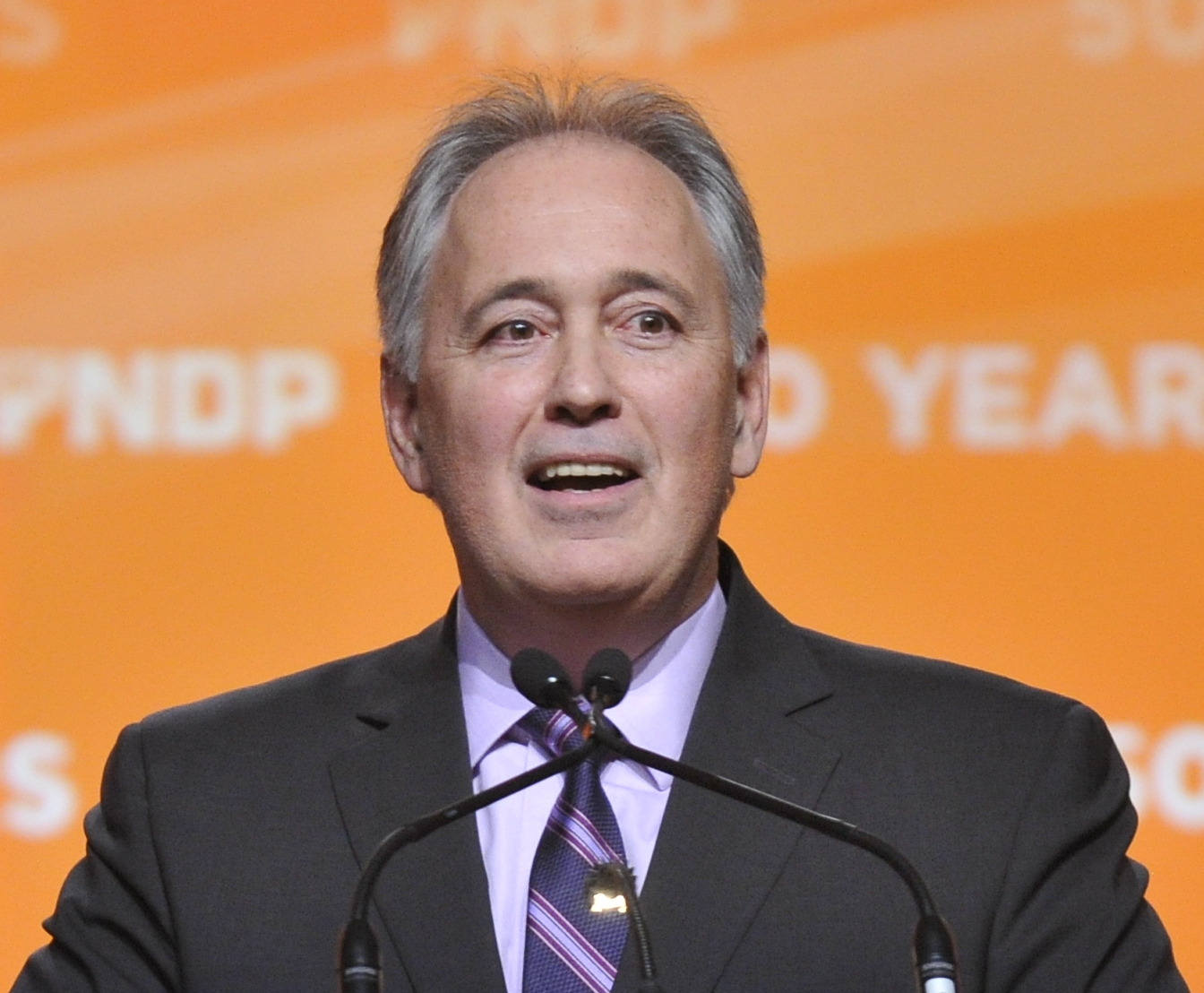
- Glen Clark at the 2011 NDP convention

31st Premier of British Columbia
- In office February 22, 1996 – August 25, 1999
- Monarch: Elizabeth II
- Lieutenant Governor: Garde Gardom
- Deputy: Dan Miller
- Preceded by: Mike Harcourt
- Succeeded by: Dan Miller

Leader of the British Columbia New Democratic Party
- In office February 22, 1996 – August 25, 1999
- Preceded by: Michael Harcourt
- Succeeded by: Dan Miller (interim)

Minister of Finance and Corporate Relations of British Columbia
- In office November 5, 1991 – September 15, 1993
- Premier: Mike Harcourt
- Preceded by: John Jansen
- Succeeded by: Elizabeth Cull

Minister of Employment and Investment of British Columbia
- In office September 15, 1993 – February 22, 1996
- Premier: Mike Harcourt
- Succeeded by: Dan Miller

Minister Responsible for Youth of British Columbia
- In office February 28, 1996 – August 25, 1999
- Premier: Glen Clark
- Succeeded by: Andrew Petter

Member of the British Columbia Legislative Assembly for Vancouver-Kingsway Vancouver East (1986-1991)
- In office October 22, 1986 – May 16, 2001 Serving with Robert Arthur Williams (1986–1991)
- Preceded by: Dave Barrett; Alexander Macdonald
- Succeeded by: Rob Nijjar

Personal details
- Born: November 22, 1957 (age 68) Nanaimo, British Columbia, Canada
- Party: British Columbia New Democratic Party
- Spouse: Dale Clark
- Education: Simon Fraser University (BA); University of British Columbia (M.A.)
- Occupation: Politician, retail executive
- Profession: Policy consultant

Glen David Clark (born November 22, 1957) is a Canadian retail executive and former politician who served as the 31st premier of British Columbia from 1996 to 1999.

== Early life and education ==
Clark attended independent Roman Catholic schools, namely St. Jude’s Elementary and Notre Dame Secondary in East Vancouver. At Notre Dame, Clark was known as a small, fearless linebacker for the football team. He was also student council president and played the lead male role in The Sound of Music and later performed in South Pacific. Clark earned a bachelor's degree from Simon Fraser University and a master's degree from the University of British Columbia. Before entering politics, he was part of the labour movement and worked as a natural resource policy consultant.

== Premier of British Columbia ==
Clark was first elected to the Legislative Assembly of British Columbia in the 1986 provincial election. He served as the Minister of Finance and Corporate Relations and then as the Minister of Employment and Investment in the government of Mike Harcourt. When Harcourt resigned as a result of the Bingogate scandal, Clark stood for and won the leadership of the BC NDP and therefore became BC's 31st premier. Clark called an election in 1996 in which his party narrowly held onto its majority. Although it received fewer votes across the province than the second-place BC Liberal Party, the NDP was able to hold on to power by winning all but eight seats in Vancouver.

Clark largely continued the policies of the Harcourt government, particularly its implementation of the B.C. Benefits welfare reform package, similar to reforms carried out by Ralph Klein in Alberta and Mike Harris in Ontario. When the 1997 party convention adopted a motion condemning the reforms and calling for an increase in welfare rates, Clark responded, "No. We have a deficit."

=== Scandals ===
==== Fast ferry scandal ====
Clark undertook the B.C. fast ferries initiative, which was designed to upgrade the existing BC Ferries fleet as well as jump start the shipbuilding industry in Vancouver. Although the ferries were eventually produced, the project had massive cost overruns and long delays, and the ferries were never able to function up to expectations. The ferries were later sold by the incoming Liberal government, for a fraction of their original price, to the American owned Washington Marine Group.

==== Casinogate ====
In March 1999, the Royal Canadian Mounted Police executed a search warrant and searched the Clark household. The media was tipped off about the raid, and BCTV showed live, primetime coverage of the premier pacing inside his house while the search was conducted. Two weeks later the RCMP conducted a search of the Premier's Office.

The subsequent investigation spawned intense coverage by the media. However, subsequent coverage also exposed numerous inaccuracies in the way the story was initially portrayed, with some critics alleging a media or RCMP conspiracy to smear him for ideological reasons.

Clark resigned suddenly on the night of August 21, 1999, following allegations that he had accepted favours (in the form of free renovations worth $10,000, which he had actually paid for) from Dimitrios Pilarinos in return for approving a casino application. He was later formally charged with committing breach of trust, a criminal offence.

Conflict of interest commissioner H.A.D. Oliver concluded in 2001 that Clark had violated conflict of interest laws in British Columbia. However, Clark was acquitted of all criminal charges by the Supreme Court of British Columbia on August 29, 2002, with Justice Elizabeth Bennett ruling that while Clark had unwisely left himself open to a perception of unethical behaviour, there was no solid evidence that he had actually done anything illegal.

== After political life ==
Upon Clark's resignation, Deputy Premier Dan Miller acceded to the interim leadership of the New Democratic Party and the premiership. Miller was succeeded by Ujjal Dosanjh after winning the party's leadership convention in 2000. Due in part to the scandals surrounding Clark, the NDP was heavily defeated by the BC Liberals under Gordon Campbell in the 2001 provincial election, winning just two seats.

In 2001 Jim Pattison hired Clark to manage his Neon Products Company. Later, Clark was president and chief operating officer of the Jim Pattison Group in Vancouver until he stepped down at the end of 2022.

In March 2024, Clark was appointed as CEO of Overstory Media Group, a Victoria-based media company, succeeding co-founder Farhan Mohamed.

In December 2024, Clark left the Jim Pattison Group after his appointment to chair BC Hydro.
