= List of British Columbian ministries =

List of governments of British Columbia

The Executive Council of British Columbia, also known as the cabinet or ministry, is the body of ministers of the Crown, that advise the monarch of British Columbia, represented by the lieutenant governor, on how to exercise executive power. By convention, a new ministry is established immediately following the swearing-in of each new premier of British Columbia. This article is a list of cabinets that have governed British Columbia since joining Canada as a province in 1871.

== List ==
| No. | Ministry | Dates | Premier | Governing party | Duration | Elections |
|---|---|---|---|---|---|---|
| —N/a | Interim ministry | August 17, 1871–November 13, 1871 | —N/a | Non-partisan | 88 days | —N/a |
| 1 | McCreight ministry | November 14, 1871–December 23, 1872 | John Foster McCreight | Non-partisan | 1 year, 39 days | 1 (1871) |
| 2 | De Cosmos ministry | December 23, 1872–February 9, 1874 | Amor De Cosmos | Non-partisan | 1 year, 48 days | —N/a |
| 3 | 1st Walkem ministry | February 11, 1874–January 27, 1876 | George Anthony Walkem | Non-partisan | 1 year, 350 days | 1 (1875) |
| 4 | Elliott ministry | February 1, 1876–June 25, 1878 | Andrew Charles Elliott | Non-partisan | 2 years, 144 days | —N/a |
| 5 | 2nd Walkem ministry | June 25, 1878–June 6, 1882 | George Anthony Walkem | Non-partisan | 3 years, 346 days | 1 (1878) |
| 6 | Beaven ministry | June 13, 1882–January 29, 1883 | Robert Beaven | Non-partisan | 230 days | 1 (1882) |
| 7 | Smithe ministry | January 29, 1883–March 28, 1887 | William Smithe | Non-partisan | 4 years, 58 days | 1 (1886) |
| 8 | A. E. B. Davie ministry | April 1, 1887–August 1, 1889 | Alexander E. B. Davie | Non-partisan | 2 years, 122 days | —N/a |
| 9 | Robson ministry | August 2, 1889–June 29, 1892 | John Robson | Non-partisan | 2 years, 332 days | 1 (1890) |
| 10 | Theodore Davie ministry | July 2, 1892–March 2, 1895 | Theodore Davie | Non-partisan | 2 years, 243 days | 1 (1894) |
| 11 | John H. Turner ministry | March 4, 1895–August 8, 1898 | John Herbert Turner | Non-partisan | 3 years, 157 days | —N/a |
| 12 | Semlin ministry | August 15, 1895–February 27, 1900 | Charles Augustus Semlin | Non-partisan | 4 years, 196 days | 1 (1898) |
| 13 | Joseph Martin ministry | February 28, 1900–June 14, 1900 | Joseph Martin | Non-partisan | 106 days | —N/a |
| 14 | Dunsmuir ministry | June 15, 1900–November 21, 1902 | James Dunsmuir | Non-partisan | 2 years, 159 days | 1 (1900) |
| 15 | Prior ministry | November 21, 1902–June 1, 1903 | Edward Gawler Prior | Non-partisan | 192 days | —N/a |
| 16 | McBride ministry | June 1, 1903–December 15, 1915 | Richard McBride | Conservative | 12 years, 197 days | 4 (1903, 1907, 1909, 1912) |
| 17 | Bowser ministry | December 15, 1915–November 23, 1916 | William John Bowser | Conservative | 344 days | —N/a |
| 18 | Brewster ministry | November 23, 1916–March 1, 1918 | Harlan Carey Brewster | Liberal | 1 year, 98 days | 1 (1916) |
| 19 | Oliver ministry | March 6, 1918–August 17, 1927 | John Oliver | Liberal | 9 years, 164 days | 2 (1920, 1924) |
| 20 | MacLean ministry | August 20, 1927–August 20, 1928 | John Duncan MacLean | Liberal | 1 year, 0 days | —N/a |
| 21 | Tolmie ministry | August 21, 1928–November 15, 1933 | Simon Fraser Tolmie | Conservative | 5 years, 86 days | 1 (1928) |
| 22 | Pattullo ministry | November 15, 1933–December 9, 1941 | Duff Pattullo | Liberal | 8 years, 24 days | 3 (1933, 1937, 1941 (Note: Government did not resign immediately after the election but was defeated within six months.)) |
| 23 | Hart ministry | December 9, 1941–December 29, 1947 | John Hart | Coalition | 6 years, 20 days | 2 (1941 (Note: Incumbent government did not resign immediately after the election, but a new government was formed within six months.), 1945) |
| 24 | Boss Johnson ministry | December 29, 1947–January 19, 1952 | Boss Johnson | Coalition | 4 years, 216 days | 1 (1949) |
| 24 | Boss Johnson ministry | January 19, 1952–August 1, 1952 | Boss Johnson | Liberal | 4 years, 216 days | 1 (1949) |
| 25 | W. A. C. Bennett ministry | August 1, 1952–September 15, 1972 | W. A. C. Bennett | Social Credit | 20 years, 45 days | 7 (1952, 1953, 1956, 1960, 1963, 1966, 1969) |
| 26 | Barrett ministry | September 15, 1972–December 22, 1975 | Dave Barrett | New Democratic | 3 years, 98 days | 1 (1972) |
| 27 | Bill Bennett ministry | December 22, 1975–August 6, 1986 | Bill Bennett | Social Credit | 10 years, 227 days | 3 (1975, 1979, 1983) |
| 28 | Vander Zalm ministry | August 6, 1986–April 2, 1991 | Bill Vander Zalm | Social Credit | 4 years, 239 days | 1 (1986) |
| 29 | Johnston ministry | April 2, 1991–November 5, 1991 | Rita Johnston | Social Credit | 217 days | —N/a |
| 30 | Harcourt ministry | November 5, 1991–February 22, 1996 | Mike Harcourt | New Democratic | 4 years, 109 days | 1 (1991) |
| 31 | Glen Clark ministry | February 22, 1996–August 25, 1999 | Glen Clark | New Democratic | 3 years, 184 days | 1 (1996) |
| 32 | Miller ministry | August 25, 1999–February 24, 2000 | Dan Miller | New Democratic | 183 days | —N/a |
| 33 | Dosanjh ministry | February 24, 2000–June 5, 2001 | Ujjal Dosanjh | New Democratic | 1 year, 101 days | —N/a |
| 34 | Campbell ministry | June 5, 2001–March 14, 2011 | Gordon Campbell | Liberal | 9 years, 282 days | 3 (2001, 2005, 2009) |
| 35 | Christy Clark ministry | March 14, 2011–July 18, 2017 | Christy Clark | Liberal | 6 years, 126 days | 2 (2013, 2017) |
| 36 | Horgan ministry | July 18, 2017–November 18, 2022 | John Horgan | New Democratic | 5 years, 123 days | 2 (2017, 2020) |
| 37 | Eby ministry | November 18, 2022–November 20, 2026 | David Eby | New Democratic | 4 years, 2 days | 1 (2024) |
| 38 | Doerkson ministry | November 20, 2026–present | Lorne Doerkson | Conservative | 0 days | 1 (2026) |

== See also ==
- List of Canadian ministries
- List of First Nations governments in British Columbia
- List of parliaments of British Columbia
- List of premiers of British Columbia

== Sources ==
- "British Columbia Executive Council Appointments (1871-1986)" (PDF). Legislative Library of British Columbia.
- "Premiers of British Columbia, 1871–today". Province of British Columbia. Archived from the original on 2013-06-04.
