= List of premiers of British Columbia =

Lorne Doerkson has been premier of British Columbia since 2026.

The premier of British Columbia is the first minister for the Canadian province of British Columbia. The province was a British crown colony governed by the governors of British Columbia before joining Canadian Confederation in 1871. Since then, it has had a unicameral Westminster-style parliamentary government, in which the premier is the leader of the party that controls the most seats in the legislative assembly. The premier is British Columbia's head of government, and the king of Canada is its head of state and is represented by the lieutenant governor of British Columbia. The premier picks a cabinet from the elected members to form the Executive Council of British Columbia and presides over that body.

Members are first elected to the legislature during general elections. General elections must be conducted every four years from the date of the last election. An election may take place before the four-year mark if the governing party loses the confidence of the legislature by the defeat of a supply bill or the passage of a no-confidence motion, provided that there is no alternative configuration in the legislature that the lieutenant governor believes can command confidence. (Note: See the 2017 British Columbia general election and aftermath.)

Before 1903, British Columbia did not use a party system; instead, premiers of British Columbia had no official party affiliation and were chosen by elected members of the legislative assembly from among themselves. Candidates ran as "Government", "Opposition", "Independent", or in formulations such as "Opposition independent", indicating their respective positions to the incumbent regime.

British Columbia has had 36 individuals serve as premier since joining Confederation, of which 14 individuals had no party affiliation, three were Conservatives, eight were Liberals, four were Socreds, and seven were New Democrats. The first premier was John Foster McCreight, who was inaugurated in 1871. Joseph Martin spent the shortest time in office, at 106 days. At over twenty years, W. A. C. Bennett spent the longest time in office and is the only premier to serve in more than five parliaments. The incumbent premier is Lorne Doerkson, who was sworn in on November 19, 2026.

== Premiers of British Columbia ==
No.	Portrait	Name (Birth–Death)	Term of office	Electoral mandates (Assembly)	Political party	Parliamentary seat	Cabinet	Ref.
1		John Foster McCreight (1827–1913)	14 November 1871 – 23 December 1872	Title created (caretaker government) 1871 election (1st Leg.)	Non-partisan	MLA for Victoria City	McCreight ministry	
2		Amor De Cosmos (1825–1897)	23 December 1872 – 11 February 1874	Appointment (1st Leg.)	Non-partisan	MLA for Victoria	De Cosmos ministry	
3 (Note: Unlike other Canadian jurisdictions, British Columbia's legislative library follows the American convention of giving multiple ordinal numbers to premiers who serve non-consecutive terms. George Anthony Walkem is therefore both the third and fifth premier.) (1 of 2)		George Anthony Walkem (1834–1908)	11 February 1874 – 1 February 1876	Appointment (1st Leg.) 1875 election (2nd Leg.)	Non-partisan	MLA for Cariboo	1st Walkem ministry	
4		Andrew Charles Elliott (1829–1889)	1 February 1876 – 25 June 1878	Appointment (2nd Leg.)	Non-partisan	MLA for Victoria City	Elliott ministry	
5 (2 of 2)		George Anthony Walkem (1834–1908)	25 June 1878 – 13 June 1882	1878 election (3rd Leg.)	Non-partisan	MLA for Cariboo	2nd Walkem ministry	
6		Robert Beaven (1836–1920)	13 June 1882 – 29 January 1883	Appointment (3rd Leg.) 1882 election (4th Leg.)	Non-partisan	MLA for Victoria City	Beaven ministry	
7		William Smithe (1842–1887)	29 January 1883 – 28 March 1887	Appointment (4th Leg.) 1886 election (5th Leg.)	Non-partisan	MLA for Cowichan	Smithe ministry	
8		Alexander Edmund Batson Davie (1847–1889)	1 April 1887 – 1 August 1889	Appointment (5th Leg.)	Non-partisan	MLA for Lillooet	A. E. B. Davie ministry	
9		John Robson (1824–1892)	2 August 1889 – 29 June 1892	Appointment (5th Leg.) 1890 election (6th Leg.)	Non-partisan	MLA for New Westminster (1889–1890) MLA for Cariboo (Note: In the 1890 election, Robson also won the seat in the riding of Westminster but turned it down.) (1890–1892)	Robson ministry	
10		Theodore Davie (1852–1898)	2 July 1892 – 4 March 1895	Appointment (6th Leg.) 1894 election (7th Leg.)	Non-partisan	MLA for Cowichan-Alberni	T. Davie ministry	
11		John Herbert Turner (1834–1923)	4 March 1895 – 15 August 1898	Appointment (7th Leg.)	Non-partisan	MLA for Victoria City	Turner ministry	
12		Charles Augustus Semlin (1836–1927)	15 August 1898 – 28 February 1900	1898 election (8th Leg.)	Non-partisan	MLA for Yale-West	Semlin ministry	
13		Joseph Martin (1852–1923)	28 February 1900 – 15 June 1900	Appointment (8th Leg.)	Non-partisan	MLA for Vancouver City	Martin ministry	
13		Joseph Martin (1852–1923)	Immediately lost a confidence vote 28 to 1 upon being appointed but formed a cabinet and governed for another three months anyway					
14		James Dunsmuir (1851–1920)	15 June 1900 – 21 November 1902	1900 election (9th Leg.)	Non-partisan	MLA for South Nanaimo	Dunsmuir ministry	
15		Edward Gawler Prior (1853–1920)	21 November 1902 – 1 June 1903	Appointment (9th Leg.)	Non-partisan	MLA for Victoria City	Prior ministry	
16		Richard McBride (1870–1917)	1 June 1903 – 15 December 1915	Appointment (9th Leg.) 1903 election (10th Leg.) 1907 election (11th Leg.) 1909 election (12th Leg.) 1912 election (13th Leg.)	Conservative (Ldr. 1903)	MLA for Westminster-Dewdney (1903) MLA for Dewdney (1903–1907) MLA for Victoria City (Note: In the 1907 election, McBride also won the seat in the riding of Dewdney but turned it down.) (Note: In the 1909 election, McBride also won the seat in the riding of Yale but turned it down.) (1907–1915)	McBride ministry	
16		Richard McBride (1870–1917)	Led first partisan administration. During First World War, the provincial government purchased and took possession of two submarines to defend the province from the threat of German attack; quickly transferred by order of the federal government to the Royal Canadian Navy in August 1914. Created the province's first university, the University of British Columbia.					
17		William John Bowser (1867–1933)	15 December 1915 – 23 November 1916	Appointment (13th Leg.)	Conservative (Ldr. 1915)	MLA for Vancouver City	Bowser ministry	
18		Harlan Carey Brewster (1870–1918)	23 November 1916 – 1 March 1918	1916 election (14th Leg.)	Liberal (Ldr. 1912)	MLA for Victoria City (Note: In the 1916 election, Brewster also won the seat in the riding of Alberni but turned it down.)	Brewster ministry	
18		Harlan Carey Brewster (1870–1918)	Brought in women's suffrage, instituted prohibition, and combatted political corruption					
19		John Oliver (1856–1927)	6 March 1918 – 17 August 1927	Appointment (14th Leg.) 1920 election (15th Leg.) 1924 election (16th Leg.)	Liberal (Ldr. 1918)	MLA for Dewdney (1918–1920) MLA for Victoria City (Note: In the 1920 election, Oliver also won the seat in the riding of Delta but turned it down.) (1920–1924) MLA for Nelson (1924–1927)	Oliver ministry	
19		John Oliver (1856–1927)	Developed the produce industry in the Okanagan Valley, and tried to persuade the federal government to lower the freight rate for rail transport. In 1923, hosted the visit of Warren Harding to Vancouver, the first ever visit of a sitting United States President to Canada.					
20		John Duncan MacLean (1873–1948)	20 August 1927 – 21 August 1928	Appointment (16th Leg.)	Liberal (Ldr. 1927)	MLA for Yale	MacLean ministry	
21		Simon Fraser Tolmie (1867–1937)	21 August 1928 – 15 November 1933	1928 election (17th Leg.)	Conservative (Ldr. 1926)	MLA for Saanich	Tolmie ministry	
21		Simon Fraser Tolmie (1867–1937)	Attempted to apply "business principles to the business of government" during the Great Depression hit. Unemployment reached 28% – the highest in Canada. Set up relief camps. The Kidd Report recommended such sharp cuts to social services that the Conservative Party split and decided to run no candidates in the 1933 election. Local riding associations that supported Tolmie ran "Unionist" candidates while those supporting former premier Bowser stood "non-partisan" candidates and others ran as Independent Conservatives, resulting in electoral collapse and only 2 Conservative MLAs (one pro-Bowser, one pro-Tolmie) being returned and Tolmie losing his own seat.					
22		Thomas Dufferin Pattullo (1873–1956)	15 November 1933 – 9 December 1941	1933 election (18th Leg.) 1937 election (19th Leg.) 1941 election (20th Leg.)	Liberal (Ldr. 1929)	MLA for Prince Rupert	Pattullo ministry	
22		Thomas Dufferin Pattullo (1873–1956)	Attempted to extend government services and relief to the unemployed during the Great Depression. Re-elected in 1937 using the slogan "socialized capitalism". Failed to win a majority in 1941 and removed as leader by his party when he was unwilling to form a coalition government with the Conservative Party to keep the Co-operative Commonwealth Federation out of power.					
23		John Hart (1879–1957)	9 December 1941 – 29 December 1947	Appointment (20th Leg.) 1945 election (21st Leg.)	Liberal (Ldr. 1941)	MLA for Victoria City	Hart ministry	^{[Co.]}
23		John Hart (1879–1957)	Became Liberal leader and premier in order to form a coalition government with the Conservatives, which his predecessor had refused to do, in order to keep the socialist CCF out of power. Undertook an ambitious program of rural electrification, hydroelectric and highway construction. Built Highway 97 to northern British Columbia and relaunched the Bridge River Power Project, which was the province's first major hydroelectric development. Established the BC Power Commission to provide power to smaller communities that were not serviced by private utilities.					
24		Boss Johnson (1890–1964)	29 December 1947 – 1 August 1952	Appointment (21st Leg.) 1949 election (22nd Leg.)	Liberal (Ldr. 1947)	MLA for New Westminster	Johnson ministry	^{[Co.]}
24		Boss Johnson (1890–1964)	Introduced compulsory health insurance, and a 3% provincial sales tax to pay for it, expanded the highway system, extended the Pacific Great Eastern Railway, and negotiated the Alcan Agreement, which facilitated construction of the Kenney Dam. Coalition government collapsed when Conservatives left to form the Official Opposition in January 1952, leaving Johnson to lead a straight Liberal government until its defeat in that year's general election.					
25		W. A. C. Bennett (1900–1979)	1 August 1952 – 15 September 1972	1952 election (23rd Leg.) 1953 election (24th Leg.) 1956 election (25th Leg.) 1960 election (26th Leg.) 1963 election (27th Leg.) 1966 election (28th Leg.) 1969 election (29th Leg.)	Social Credit	MLA for South Okanagan	W. A. C. Bennett ministry	
25		W. A. C. Bennett (1900–1979)	Longest-serving premier. Oversaw rapid expansion of the province's highway system and BC Rail, creation of BC Ferries, BC Hydro, and the Bank of British Columbia, hydro-electric dam-building projects on the Columbia and Peace Rivers and the creation of the University of Victoria and Simon Fraser University.					
26		Dave Barrett (1930–2018)	15 September 1972 – 22 December 1975	1972 election (30th Leg.)	New Democratic (Ldr. 1970)	MLA for Coquitlam	Barrett ministry	
26		Dave Barrett (1930–2018)	Reformed the welfare system, established the province's Labour Relations Board, and expanded the public sector. Reformed Legislative Assembly by introducing question period and full Hansard transcripts of legislative proceedings. Brought in the Agricultural Land Reserve (ALR) to protect the supply of farm land and Insurance Corporation of British Columbia to provide public car insurance.					
27		Bill Bennett (1932–2015)	22 December 1975 – 6 August 1986	1975 election (31st Leg.) 1979 election (32nd Leg.) 1983 election (33rd Leg.)	Social Credit (Ldr. 1973)	MLA for South Okanagan (1975–1979) MLA for Okanagan South (1979–1986)	B. Bennett ministry	
27		Bill Bennett (1932–2015)	Implemented significant cuts to social services and education and repealed labour laws, resulting in a general strike. Spent hundreds of millions of dollars on Expo 86 and the construction of BC Place, Vancouver's SkyTrain rapid transit system, and the Vancouver Convention Centre. Built the Coquihalla Highway.					
28		Bill Vander Zalm (b. 1934)	6 August 1986 – 2 April 1991	Appointment (33rd Leg.) 1986 election (34th Leg.)	Social Credit (Ldr. 1986)	MLA for Richmond	Vander Zalm ministry	
28		Bill Vander Zalm (b. 1934)	Granted five community colleges authority to grant baccalaureate degrees (Cariboo, Fraser Valley, Kwantlen, Malaspina, and Okanagan). Built Phase 3 of the Coquihalla Highway. Forced to resign due to Fantasy Gardens conflict of interest controversy.					
29		Rita Johnston (b. 1935)	2 April 1991 – 5 November 1991	Appointment (34th Leg.)	Social Credit (Ldr. 1991)	MLA for Surrey-Newton	Johnston ministry	
30		Mike Harcourt (b. 1943)	5 November 1991 – 22 February 1996	1991 election (35th Leg.)	New Democratic (Ldr. 1987)	MLA for Vancouver-Mount Pleasant	Harcourt ministry	
30		Mike Harcourt (b. 1943)	Reformed the welfare system. Resigned due to Bingogate.					
31		Glen Clark (b. 1957)	22 February 1996 – 25 August 1999	Appointment (35th Leg.) 1996 election (36th Leg.)	New Democratic (Ldr. 1996)	MLA for Vancouver-Kingsway	G. Clark ministry	
31		Glen Clark (b. 1957)	Signed the Nisga'a Final Agreement, continued welfare reform. Resigned due to the Fast Ferry Scandal and Casinogate.					
32		Dan Miller (b. 1944)	25 August 1999 – 24 February 2000	Appointment (36th Leg.)	New Democratic (Ldr. 1999)	MLA for North Coast	Miller ministry	
33		Ujjal Dosanjh (b. 1947)	24 February 2000 – 5 June 2001	Appointment (36th Leg.)	New Democratic (Ldr. 2000)	MLA for Vancouver-Kensington	Dosanjh ministry	
33		Ujjal Dosanjh (b. 1947)	Created the Sex Offenders Registry					
34		Gordon Campbell (b. 1948)	5 June 2001 – 14 March 2011	2001 election (37th Leg.) 2005 election (38th Leg.) 2009 election (39th Leg.)	Liberal (Ldr. 1993)	MLA for Vancouver-Point Grey	Campbell ministry	
34		Gordon Campbell (b. 1948)	Privatized BC Rail, hosted the 2010 Winter Olympics, oversaw the launch of the Canada Line, introduced the provincial carbon tax, oversaw the completion of Golden Ears Bridge, resigned in HST controversy					
35		Christy Clark (b. 1965)	14 March 2011 – 18 July 2017	Appointment (39th Leg.) 2013 election (40th Leg.) 2017 election (41st Leg.)	Liberal (Ldr. 2011)	MLA for N/A (did not hold a seat) (Note: Christy Clark did not have a seat when appointed as premier and served as premier without a constituency until elected in a by-election.) (2011) MLA for Vancouver-Point Grey (2011–2013) MLA for N/A (did not hold a seat) (Note: Christy Clark lost her seat in the 2013 British Columbia general election and served as premier without a constituency for 56 days until elected in a by-election.) (2013) MLA for Westside-Kelowna (2013–2017)	C. Clark ministry	(Note: C. Clark's government remained in office after the 2017 election until defeated 44 to 42 on a confidence vote less than a week into the legislative session. The lieutenant governor asked Horgan to form a government on the strength of a confidence and supply agreement between the NDP and the Green Party. Horgan led a minority government for the remainder of the 41st Parliament until the 2020 election, when the NDP attained a majority.)
35		Christy Clark (b. 1965)	Increased minimum wage from $8.00/hr to $10.25/hr, oversaw completion of the Gateway Program, introduced Family Day statutory holiday, oversaw completion of Evergreen Extension. Resigned after she lost the confidence of the Assembly.					
36		John Horgan (1959–2024)	18 July 2017 – 18 November 2022	Appointment (41st Leg.) 2020 election (42nd Leg.)	New Democratic (Ldr. 2014)	MLA for Langford-Juan de Fuca	Horgan ministry	
36		John Horgan (1959–2024)	Continued construction of John Horgan Dam, replaced medical service plan fee with payroll tax, increased minimum wage from $10.25/hr to $15.65/hr, indexed minimum wage to inflation.					
37		David Eby (b. 1976)	18 November 2022 – 20 November 2026	Appointment (42nd Leg.) 2024 election (43rd Leg.)	New Democratic (Ldr. 2022)	MLA for Vancouver-Point Grey	Eby ministry	(Note: Eby called a snap election for October 24, 2026, less than two years into his government's four-year mandate. Eby cited economic threats from the United States under President Donald Trump as justification for the early election. The election was called amid divisions within the opposition Conservative Party of British Columbia, whose leader, Kerry-Lynne Findlay, had resigned two days earlier.)
37		David Eby (b. 1976)	Introduced housing reforms permitting higher-density residential development, particularly near public transit, restricted short-term rentals, and implemented a home flipping tax. Expanded access to free prescription contraception and publicly funded in vitro fertilisation. Oversaw changes to the province's drug decriminalization pilot project, including restrictions on public drug use. Led the NDP to a narrow majority in the 2024 British Columbia general election. Introduced legislation to expedite major infrastructure and renewable energy projects and measures responding to United States tariffs.					
38		Lorne Doerkson (b. 1968)	20 November 2026 – incumbent	2026 election (44th Leg.)	Conservative (Ldr. 2026; interim)	MLA for Cariboo-Chilcotin	Doerkson ministry	
^{Min.} Led a minority government^{Co.} Led a coalition government

== List of premiers by time in office ==
Rank	Premier	Total time in office	Dates in office	Mandates	Party
1	W. A. C. Bennett	20 years, 45 days	August 1, 1952 – September 15, 1972	7	█ Social Credit
2	Richard McBride	12 years, 197 days	June 1, 1903 – December 15, 1915	5	█ Conservative
3	Bill Bennett	10 years, 227 days	December 22, 1975 – August 6, 1986	3	█ Social Credit
4	Gordon Campbell	9 years, 282 days	June 5, 2001 – March 14, 2011	3	█ Liberal
5	John Oliver	9 years, 164 days	March 6, 1918 – August 17, 1927	3	█ Liberal
6	Thomas Dufferin Pattullo	8 years, 24 days	November 15, 1933 – December 9, 1941	3	█ Liberal
7	Christy Clark	6 years, 126 days	March 14, 2011 – July 18, 2017	3	█ Liberal
8	John Hart	6 years, 20 days	December 9, 1941 – December 29, 1947	2	█ Liberal
9	George Anthony Walkem	5 years, 343 days	February 11, 1874 – February 1, 1876 June 25, 1878 – June 13, 1882	3	█ Non-partisan
10	John Horgan	5 years, 123 days	July 18, 2017 – November 18, 2022	2	█ New Democratic
11	Simon Fraser Tolmie	5 years, 86 days	August 21, 1928 – November 15, 1933	1	█ Conservative
12	Bill Vander Zalm	4 years, 239 days	August 6, 1986 – April 2, 1991	2	█ Social Credit
13	Boss Johnson	4 years, 216 days	December 29, 1947 – August 1, 1952	2	█ Liberal
14	Mike Harcourt	4 years, 109 days	November 5, 1991 – February 22, 1996	1	█ New Democratic
15	William Smithe	4 years, 58 days	January 29, 1883 – March 28, 1887	2	█ Non-partisan
16	David Eby	4 years, 1 day	November 18, 2022 – November 20, 2026	2	█ New Democratic
17	Glen Clark	3 years, 184 days	February 22, 1996 – August 25, 1999	2	█ New Democratic
18	John Herbert Turner	3 years, 164 days	March 4, 1895 – August 15, 1898	1	█ Non-partisan
19	Dave Barrett	3 years, 98 days	September 15, 1972 – December 22, 1975	1	█ New Democratic
20	John Robson	2 years, 332 days	August 2, 1889 – June 29, 1892	2	█ Non-partisan
21	Theodore Davie	2 years, 243 days	July 2, 1892 – March 4, 1895	2	█ Non-partisan
22	James Dunsmuir	2 years, 159 days	June 15, 1900 – November 21, 1902	1	█ Non-partisan
23	Andrew Charles Elliott	2 years, 144 days	February 1, 1876 – June 25, 1878	1	█ Non-partisan
24	Alexander E. B. Davie	2 years, 122 days	April 1, 1887 – August 1, 1889	1	█ Non-partisan
25	Charles Augustus Semlin	1 year, 196 days	August 15, 1898 – February 27, 1900	1	█ Non-partisan
26	Ujjal Dosanjh	1 year, 101 days	February 24, 2000 – June 5, 2001	1	█ New Democratic
27	Harlan Carey Brewster	1 year, 98 days	November 23, 1916 – March 1, 1918	1	█ Liberal
28	Amor De Cosmos	1 year, 50 days	December 23, 1872 – February 11, 1874	1	█ Non-partisan
29	John Foster McCreight	1 year, 39 days	November 14, 1871 – December 23, 1872	1	█ Non-partisan
30	John Duncan MacLean	1 year, 1 day	August 20, 1927 – August 21, 1928	1	█ Liberal
31	William John Bowser	344 days	December 15, 1915 – November 23, 1916	1	█ Conservative
32	Robert Beaven	230 days	June 13, 1882 – January 29, 1883	1	█ Non-partisan
33	Rita Johnston	217 days	April 2, 1991 – November 5, 1991	1	█ Social Credit
34	Edward Gawler Prior	192 days	November 21, 1902 – June 1, 1903	1	█ Non-partisan
35	Dan Miller	183 days	August 25, 1999 – February 24, 2000	1	█ New Democratic
36	Joseph Martin	107 days	February 28, 1900 – June 15, 1900	1	█ Non-partisan
38	Lorne Doerkson (Incumbent)	0 days	November 20, 2026 – present	1	█ Conservative

=== Political parties by time in office ===
By premier's party
Party	Time in office (days)	#	Premiers
Liberal Party	17,010 (Note: This number includes the entire premierships of John Hart and Boss Johnson, as they were Liberal party members, despite them leading coalition governments with some Conservative MLAs.)	8	Harlan Carey Brewster, John Oliver, John Duncan MacLean, Duff Pattullo, John Hart, Boss Johnson, Gordon Campbell, and Christy Clark
Social Credit Party	13,151	4	W. A. C. Bennett, Bill Bennett, Bill Vander Zalm, and Rita Johnston
New Democratic Party	8,112	7	Dave Barrett, Mike Harcourt, Glen Clark, Dan Miller, Ujjal Dosanjh, John Horgan, and David Eby
Conservative Party	6,840	3	Richard McBride, William John Bowser, Simon Fraser Tolmie and Lorne Doerkson (Incumbent)

By cabinet's party
Party	Time in office (days)	#	Cabinets
Liberal Party	13,317	7	Brewster, Oliver, MacLean, Pattullo, Johnson (Note: Boss Johnson led a coalition majority government from December 29, 1947 to January 18, 1952, and a Liberal minority government from January 18, 1952 to August 1, 1952.), Campbell, and C. Clark
Social Credit Party	13,151	4	W. A. C. Bennett, B. Bennett, Vander Zalm, and Johnston
New Democratic Party	8,112	7	Barrett, Harcourt, G. Clark, Miller, Dosanjh, Horgan, and Eby
Conservative Party	6,840	4	McBride ministry, Bowser ministry, Tolmie ministry and Doerkson ministry (Incumbent)
Liberal–Conservative coalition	3,694	2	Hart, and Johnson

== See also ==
- List of British Columbian ministries
- Leader of the Opposition (British Columbia)
