= MacLean ministry =

Cabinet of British Columbia, 1928–1933

- 20th ministry of British Columbia
- Date formed: August 20, 1927
- Date dissolved: August 20, 1928

People and organisations
- Monarch: George V
- Lieutenant Governor: Robert Randolph Bruce
- Premier: John Duncan MacLean
- Member parties: Liberal Party
- Status in legislature: Majority
- Opposition party: Conservative Party
- Opposition leader: Robert Henry Pooley

History
- Election: N/A (appointed)
- Legislature term: 16th Parliament of British Columbia
- Predecessor: Oliver ministry
- Successor: Tolmie ministry

The MacLean ministry was the combined Cabinet (formally the Executive Council of British Columbia) that governed British Columbia from August 20, 1927, to August 21, 1928. It was led by John Duncan MacLean, the 20th Premier of British Columbia, and was composed of members of the Liberal Party.

The MacLean ministry was established following the death of the 19th Premier of British Columbia, John Oliver, and the election of John Duncan MacLean as the leader of the Liberal Party.

The ministry was disestablished and replaced following the defeat of the Liberal Party in the 1928 election.

== List of ministers ==
MacLean ministry by portfolio
Portfolio	Minister	Tenure	
Portfolio	Minister	Start	End
Premier of British Columbia	John Duncan MacLean	August 20, 1927	August 20, 1928
Minister of Agriculture	Edward Dodsley Barrow	August 20, 1927	August 20, 1928
Attorney General	Alexander Malcolm Manson	August 20, 1927	August 20, 1928
Minister of Education	John Duncan MacLean	August 20, 1927	August 20, 1928
Minister of Finance	John Duncan MacLean	August 20, 1927	June 5, 1928
Minister of Finance	Dugald Donaghy	June 5, 1928	August 20, 1928
Minister of Industries	John Duncan MacLean	August 20, 1927	June 5, 1928
Minister of Industries	Dugald Donaghy	June 5, 1928	August 20, 1928
Minister of Labour	Alexander Malcolm Manson	August 20, 1927	August 20, 1928
Minister of Lands	Thomas Dufferin Pattullo	August 20, 1927	August 20, 1928
Minister of Mines	William Sloan	August 20, 1927	March 2, 1928
Minister of Mines	William Henry Sutherland	March 2, 1928	August 20, 1928
Provincial Secretary	William Sloan	August 20, 1927	December 30, 1927
Provincial Secretary	Thomas Dufferin Pattullo	December 30, 1927	June 5, 1928
Provincial Secretary	Ian Alistair MacKenzie	June 5, 1928	August 20, 1928
Minister of Public Works	William Henry Sutherland	August 20, 1927	August 20, 1928
Minister of Railways	William Henry Sutherland	August 20, 1927	August 20, 1928
