= Oliver ministry =

Cabinet of British Columbia, 1933–1941

- 19th ministry of British Columbia
- Date formed: March 6, 1918
- Date dissolved: August 17, 1927

People and organisations
- Monarch: George V
- Lieutenant Governor: Francis Stillman Barnard (1918–1919); Edward Gawler Prior (1919–1920); James Alexander MacDonald (1920); Walter Cameron Nichol (1920–1926); Robert Randolph Bruce (1926–1927)
- Premier: John Oliver
- Member parties: Liberal Party
- Status in legislature: Majority
- Opposition party: Conservative Party
- Opposition leader: William John Bowser (1917–1923); Robert Henry Pooley (1924–1927)

History
- Elections: 1920, 1924
- Legislature terms: 14th Parliament of British Columbia; 15th Parliament of British Columbia; 16th Parliament of British Columbia
- Predecessor: Brewster ministry
- Successor: MacLean ministry

The Oliver ministry was the combined Cabinet (formally the Executive Council of British Columbia) that governed British Columbia from March 6, 1918, to August 7, 1927. It was led by John Oliver, the 19th premier of British Columbia, and was composed of members of the Liberal Party.

The Oliver ministry was established following the death of the previous Premier, Harlan Carey Brewster and the election of John Oliver as the leader of the Liberal Party and hence Premier. It governed for the remainder of the 14th Parliament of British Columbia and, after re-election in the 1920 and 1924 elections, the entirety of the 15th Parliament of British Columbia and the duration of the 16th Parliament of British Columbia up to John Oliver's death on August 17, 1927.

== List of ministers ==
Oliver ministry by portfolio
Portfolio	Minister	Tenure	
Portfolio	Minister	Start	End
Premier of British Columbia	John Oliver	March 6, 1918	August 17, 1927
Minister of Agriculture	John Oliver	March 6, 1918	April 25, 1918
Minister of Agriculture	Edward Dodsley Barrow	April 25, 1918	August 17, 1927
Attorney General	John Wallace de Beque Farris	March 6, 1918	January 28, 1922
Attorney General	Alexander Malcolm Manson	January 28, 1922	August 17, 1927
Minister of Education	John Duncan MacLean	March 6, 1918	August 17, 1927
Minister of Finance	John Hart	March 6, 1918	August 28, 1924
Minister of Finance	John Duncan MacLean	August 28, 1924	August 17, 1927
Minister of Industries	John Oliver	June 14, 1919	April 10, 1922
Minister of Industries	Joe Hart	April 10, 1922	August 28, 1924
Minister of Industries	John Duncan MacLean	September 6, 1924	August 17, 1927
Minister of Labour	John Wallace de Beque Farris	March 6, 1918	January 28, 1922
Minister of Labour	Vacant	January 28, 1922	April 12, 1922
Minister of Labour	Alexander Malcolm Manson	April 12, 1922	August 17, 1927
Minister of Lands	Thomas Dufferin Pattullo	March 6, 1918	August 17, 1927
Minister of Mines	William Sloan	March 6, 1918	August 17, 1927
Provincial Secretary	John Duncan MacLean	March 6, 1918	September 6, 1924
Provincial Secretary	Kenneth Cattanach MacDonald	September 6, 1924	October 6, 1924
Provincial Secretary	William Sloan	October 7, 1924	August 17, 1927
Minister of Public Works	James Horace King	March 6, 1918	January 24, 1922
Minister of Public Works	William Henry Sutherland	January 24, 1922	August 17, 1927
Minister of Railways	John Oliver	March 6, 1918	October 17, 1922
Minister of Railways	John Duncan MacLean	October 17, 1922	August 28, 1924
Minister of Railways	William Henry Sutherland	August 28, 1924	August 17, 1927
Minister without Portfolio	Mary Ellen Smith	March 24, 1921	November 19, 1921
