= Davie ministry =

The Davie ministry may refer to one of two cabinets that governed the province of British Columbia in the 19th century:

- A. E. B. Davie ministry, led by Alexander Edmund Batson Davie from 1887 to 1889
- Theodore Davie ministry, led by Theodore Davie from 1892 to 1895
