= Tolmie ministry =

Cabinet of British Columbia, 1928–1933

- 21st ministry of British Columbia
- Date formed: August 21, 1928
- Date dissolved: November 15, 1933

People and organisations
- Monarch: George V
- Lieutenant Governor: Robert Randolph Bruce (1928–1931); John William Fordham Johnson (1931–1933)
- Premier: Simon Fraser Tolmie
- Member parties: Conservative Party
- Status in legislature: Majority
- Opposition party: Liberal Party
- Opposition leader: Duff Pattullo

History
- Election: 1928
- Legislature term: 17th Parliament of British Columbia
- Predecessor: MacLean ministry
- Successor: Pattullo ministry

The Tolmie ministry was the combined Cabinet (formally the Executive Council of British Columbia) that governed British Columbia from August 21, 1928, to November 15, 1933. It was led by Simon Fraser Tolmie, the 21st premier of British Columbia, and was composed of members of the Conservative Party.

The Tolmie ministry was established following the 1928 election, in which the Conservative Party won a majority government. It governed for the entirety of the 17th Parliament of British Columbia.

The ministry was disestablished and replaced following Tolmie's defeat in the 1933 election. Until 2026, this was the last time the Conservative Party formed the government, although they were a junior coalition partner in the Hart and Johnson ministries from 1941 to 1952.

== List of ministers ==
Pattullo ministry by portfolio
Portfolio	Minister	Tenure	
Portfolio	Minister	Start	End
Premier of British Columbia	Simon Fraser Tolmie	August 21, 1928	November 15, 1933
President of the Council	Rolf Wallgren Bruhn	August 21, 1928	October 29, 1930
President of the Council	William Curtis Shelly	October 29, 1930	May 31, 1933
President of the Council	Simon Fraser Tolmie	May 31, 1933	November 15, 1933
Minister of Agriculture	William Atkinson	August 21, 1928	May 31, 1933
Minister of Agriculture	Frank Putnam	June 1, 1933	November 15, 1933
Attorney General	Robert Henry Pooley	August 21, 1928	November 15, 1933
Minister of Education	Joshua Hinchcliffe	August 21, 1928	November 15, 1933
Minister of Finance	William Curtis Shelly	August 21, 1928	October 29, 1930
Minister of Finance	James William Jones	October 29, 1930	November 15, 1933
Minister of Industries	Vacant	August 21, 1928	September 5, 1928
Minister of Industries	William Curtis Shelly	September 5, 1928	October 29, 1930
Minister of Industries	James William Jones	October 29, 1930	November 15, 1933
Minister of Labour	Vacant	August 21, 1928	August 30, 1928
Minister of Labour	William Alexander McKenzie	August 30, 1928	May 16, 1933
Minister of Labour	William Middleton Dennies	May 16, 1933	November 15, 1933
Minister of Lands	Frederick Parker Burden	August 21, 1928	October 29, 1930
Minister of Lands	Nelson Seymour Lougheed	October 29, 1930	May 31, 1933
Minister of Lands	Joshua Hinchcliffe	June 1, 1933	November 15, 1933
Minister of Mines	William Alexander McKenzie	August 21, 1928	June 2, 1933
Minister of Mines	Samuel Lyness Howe	June 2, 1933	November 15, 1933
Provincial Secretary	Samuel Lyness Howe	August 21, 1928	November 15, 1933
Minister of Public Works	Nelson Seymour Lougheed	November 15, 1933	October 29, 1930
Minister of Public Works	Rolf Wallgren Bruhn	October 29, 1930	June 28, 1933
Minister of Public Works	Robert Henry Pooley	July 15, 1933	September 11, 1933
Minister of Public Works	William Savage	September 11, 1933	November 15, 1933
Minister of Railways	Simon Fraser Tolmie	August 21, 1928	November 15, 1933
Minister without Portfolio	Royal Lethington Maitland	August 21, 1928	November 15, 1933
