= Ministry of Attorney General of British Columbia =

The Ministry of Attorney General of British Columbia is a provincial government department responsible for administering British Columbia’s justice system, including court administration, prosecution services, legal aid, administrative tribunals, civil and family justice services, human rights, legal advice to the provincial government, and justice policy development. Working alongside the Ministry of Public Safety and Solicitor General, it supports the province’s justice and public safety sector. The ministry oversees multiculturalism and anti-racism initiatives and houses the Indigenous Justice Secretariat in partnership with the BC First Nations Justice Council.

== Background ==
The Attorney General of British Columbia oversees the Ministry of Attorney General within the province of British Columbia, Canada. The attorney general is a member of the provincial cabinet, typically a member of Legislative Assembly who is chosen by the premier of British Columbia and formally appointed by the lieutenant governor of British Columbia.

The Ministry of Attorney General of British Columbia was established on August 5, 1871, following British Columbia's entry into the Canadian Confederation on July 20, 1871. John Foster McCreight, who also served as the first Premier of British Columbia, was the first Attorney General of the province of British Columbia.

The ministry’s mandate includes ensuring that the justice system in British Columbia keeps communities safe and operates with fairness, proportionality, and certainty in criminal, civil, and family law matters. The ministry strives to make the justice system accessible, overcoming barriers such as distance and complexity, and aims to provide clear information and options to the public.

The Ministry of Attorney General actively engages with British Columbians to shape legislation and policy. The ministry’s legislation and policy pages provide comprehensive information on legislative updates, current online consultations, and an archive of past consultations. The ministry is involved in various legislation and policy reviews to advance government priorities, address public interest issues, and respond to developments in common law. Feedback from the public is often sought on legislative or policy proposals to help the ministry evaluate and address issues related to potential changes.

The current minister and attorney general since December 7, 2022 is Niki Sharma.

== Organizations ==
As of February 14, 2025, the Ministry of Attorney General is responsible for the following public sector organizations:

- Applied Science Technologists and Technicians of BC
- Association of BC Forest Professionals
- British Columbia Ferry Commission
- BC Family Maintenance Agency
- BC Human Rights Tribunal
- British Columbia Institute of Agrologists
- British Columbia Review Board
- British Columbia Utilities Commission
- Building Code Appeal Board
- Civil Resolution Tribunal
- College of Applied Biology
- Community Care and Assisted Living Appeal Board
- Employment Standards Tribunal
- Energy Resource Appeal Tribunal
- Engineers and Geoscientists BC
- Environmental Appeal Board
- Financial Services Tribunal
- Forest Appeals Commission
- Health Professions Review Board
- Hospital Appeal Board
- Independent Investigations Office of BC
- Investigation and Standards Office
- Judicial Council of the Provincial Court of British Columbia
- Labour Relations Board
- Legal Aid BC
- Mental Health Review Board
- Notaries Public Board of Examiners
- Property Assessment Appeal Board
- Passenger Transportation Board
- Public Guardian and Trustee of British Columbia
- Safety Standards Appeal Board
- SkilledTradesBC Appeal Board
- Surface Rights Board
- Workers’ Compensation Appeal Tribunal

== See also ==
- Government of British Columbia
- Politics of British Columbia
- Attorney General of British Columbia
