= Doerkson ministry =

Cabinet of British Columbia

- 38th ministry of British Columbia

- Lorne Doerkson in 2026
- Date formed: 20 November 2026

People and organisations
- Monarch: Charles III
- Lieutenant governor: Wendy Lisogar-Cocchia
- Premier: Lorne Doerkson
- Member party: Conservative
- Status in legislature: Majority
- Opposition party: New Democratic
- Opposition leader: Jennifer Whiteside

History
- Election: 2026
- Legislature term: 44th Parliament
- Predecessor: Eby ministry

The Doerkson ministry is the combined Cabinet (formally the Executive Council of British Columbia) that has governed British Columbia since November 20, 2026. It is chaired by the 38th premier of British Columbia, Lorne Doerkson. The Cabinet is made up of members of the Conservative Party of British Columbia, which commands a majority in the Legislative Assembly of British Columbia.

The ministry was formed following the Conservative Party's victory in the 2026 British Columbia general election. It is the first Conservative-led cabinet in British Columbia since 1933, and the first cabinet with Conservative ministers since the Liberal–Conservative coalition in 1952.

Doerkson is also interim leader of the Conservative Party, and, under the party's internal constitution as presently adopted, he cannot run as permanent party leader in the next Conservative Party leadership election unless the party amends its constitution. However, because he serves at His Majesty's pleasure and the party cannot bind the Royal prerogative, his status as premier continues until such time as government loses a confidence vote of the legislature.

== List of ministers ==
Doerkson ministry by portfolio
Portfolio	Minister	Tenure	
Portfolio	Minister	Start	End
Premier of British Columbia	Lorne Doerkson	November 20, 2026	Present
Deputy Premier of British Columbia and Minister of Social Development	Claire Rattée	November 20, 2026	Present
Attorney General	Caroline Elliott	November 20, 2026	Present
Minister of Agriculture	Ian Paton	November 20, 2026	Present
Ministry of Children and Family Development	Kristina Loewen	November 20, 2026	Present
Minister of Citizens' Services and Technology	Bruce Banman	November 20, 2026	Present
Minister of Economic Development and Tourism	Gavin Dew	November 20, 2026	Present
Minister of State for Red Tape Reduction	Carson Binda	November 20, 2026	Present
Minister of State for Rural Development	Anna Kindy	November 20, 2026	Present
Minister of Education and Child Care	Lynne Block	November 20, 2026	Present
Minister of Energy, Mines and Petroleum Resources	Larry Neufeld	November 20, 2026	Present
Minister of State for Mining	Pete Davis	November 20, 2026	Present
Minister of Environment	Áʼa꞉líya Warbus	November 20, 2026	Present
Minister of Finance	Peter Milobar	November 20, 2026	Present
Minister of Forests	Kiel Giddens	November 20, 2026	Present
Minister of Health	Ryan Peterson	November 20, 2026	Present
Minister of Indigenous Relations and Reconciliation	Scott McInnis	November 20, 2026	Present
Minister of Local Government, Housing, Sport and Culture	Cathie Ounsted	November 20, 2026	Present
Minister of State for Housing	Zeeshan Wahla	November 20, 2026	Present
Minister of Post-Secondary Education and Labour	Korky Neufeld	November 20, 2026	Present
Minister of State for Labour	Harman Bhangu	November 20, 2026	Present
Minister of Public Safety and Solicitor General	Jessy Sahota	November 20, 2026	Present
Minister of State for Emergency Management	Ward Stamer	November 20, 2026	Present
Minister of Transportation and Infrastructure	Trevor Halford	November 20, 2026	Present
Minister of Water, Land and Natural Resource Operations	Donegal Wilson	November 20, 2026	Present
