= Brewster ministry =

Cabinet of British Columbia, 1916–1918

- 18th ministry of British Columbia
- Date formed: November 23, 1916
- Date dissolved: March 1, 1918

People and organisations
- Monarch: George V
- Lieutenant Governor: Francis Stillman Barnard
- Premier: Harlan Carey Brewster
- Member parties: Liberal Party
- Status in legislature: Majority
- Opposition party: Conservative Party
- Opposition leader: William John Bowser

History
- Election: 1916
- Legislature term: 14th Parliament of British Columbia
- Predecessor: Bowser ministry
- Successor: Oliver ministry

The Brewster ministry was the combined Cabinet (formally the Executive Council of British Columbia) that governed British Columbia from November 23, 1916, to March 1, 1918. It was led by Harlan Carey Brewster, the 18th premier of British Columbia, and was composed of members of the Liberal Party.

The Brewster ministry was established following the victory of the Liberals in the 1916 election. It governed in the first half of the 14th Parliament of British Columbia up to Harlan Carey Brewster's death on March 1, 1918.

== List of ministers ==
Brewster ministry by portfolio
Portfolio	Minister	Tenure	
Portfolio	Minister	Start	End
Premier of British Columbia	Harlan Carey Brewster	November 23, 1916	March 1, 1918
President of the Council	Harlan Carey Brewster	November 23, 1916	May 14, 1917
President of the Council	John Wallace de Beque Farris	May 14, 1917	June 11, 1917
President of the Council	Harlan Carey Brewster	June 11, 1917	March 1, 1918
Minister of Agriculture	John Oliver	November 29, 1916	March 1, 1918
Attorney General	Malcolm Archibald Macdonald	November 29, 1916	May 14, 1917
Attorney General	John Wallace de Beque Farris	May 14, 1917	March 1, 1918
Minister of Finance	Ralph Smith	November 29, 1916	February 15, 1917
Minister of Finance	Harlan Carey Brewster	February 15, 1917	June 11, 1917
Minister of Finance	John Hart	June 11, 1917	March 1, 1918
Minister of Labour	John Wallace de Beque Farris	May 23, 1917	March 1, 1918
Minister of Lands	Thomas Dufferin Pattullo	November 30, 1916	March 1, 1918
Minister of Mines	William Sloan	November 29, 1916	March 1, 1918
Provincial Secretary/Minister of Education	John Duncan MacLean	November 30, 1916	March 1, 1918
Minister of Public Works	James Horace King	November 29, 1916	March 1, 1918
Minister of Railways	John Oliver	November 29, 1916	March 1, 1918
