= Attorney General of British Columbia =

British Columbia cabinet minister

- Incumbent; Caroline Elliott since November 20, 2026
- Member of: Executive Council of British Columbia; King's Counsel
- Nominator: Premier of British Columbia
- Appointer: Lieutenant Governor of British Columbia
- Formation: 1859
- First holder: George Hunter Cary

The attorney general of British Columbia (AG) oversees the Ministry of Attorney General, a provincial government department responsible for the oversight of the justice system, within the province of British Columbia, Canada. The attorney general is a member of the provincial cabinet, typically a member of Legislative Assembly who is chosen by the premier of British Columbia and formally appointed by the lieutenant governor of British Columbia.

The attorney general is responsible for ensuring that public administration is conducted according to the law and as such, they are the chief advisor of law to the government, in addition to overseeing the court system and Sheriff Service. Under the King's Counsel Act, the attorney general is automatically appointed a King's Counsel upon swearing into office. The attorney general also serves as an ex officio bencher of the Law Society of British Columbia. A separate cabinet position, the Minister of Public Safety and Solicitor General, administers the province's law enforcement agencies (police, prisons and security).

Since November 20, 2026, the post has been held by Caroline Elliott.

== List of attorneys general of the Colony of British Columbia ==
- George Hunter Cary; 1859–1861
- Henry Pering Pellew Crease; 1861–1870
- George Phillippo; 1870–1871

== List of attorneys general of the province of British Columbia ==
List of ministers
Minister	Term start	Term end	Political party	Ministry
Edward Graham Alston	August 17, 1871	August 22, 1871	Non-partisan	Interim
John Foster McCreight	August 22, 1871	November 13, 1871	Non-partisan	Interim
John Foster McCreight	November 14, 1871	December 23, 1872	Non-partisan	McCreight
George Anthony Walkem	December 23, 1872	February 9, 1874	Non-partisan	De Cosmos
George Anthony Walkem	February 11, 1874	January 27, 1876	Non-partisan	Walkem I
Andrew Charles Elliott	February 1, 1876	June 25, 1878	Non-partisan	Elliott
George Anthony Walkem	June 25, 1878	June 6, 1882	Non-partisan	Walkem II
John Roland Hett	June 13, 1882	January 29, 1883	Non-partisan	Beaven
Alexander Edmund Batson Davie	January 29, 1883	March 28, 1887	Non-partisan	Smithe
Alexander Edmund Batson Davie	April 1, 1887	August 1, 1889	Non-partisan	A. E. B. Davie
Theodore Davie	August 3, 1889	June 29, 1892	Non-partisan	Robson
Theodore Davie	July 2, 1892	March 2, 1895	Non-partisan	T. Davie
David McEwen Eberts	March 4, 1895	August 8, 1898	Non-partisan	Turner
Joseph Martin	August 15, 1898	July 27, 1899	Non-partisan	Semlin
Alexander Henderson	August 7, 1899	February 27, 1900	Non-partisan	Semlin
Joseph Martin	February 28, 1900	June 14, 1900	Non-partisan	Martin
David McEwen Eberts	June 15, 1900	November 21, 1900	Non-partisan	Dunsmuir
David McEwen Eberts	November 25, 1902	May 27, 1903	Non-partisan	Prior
Albert Edward McPhillips	June 4, 1903	November 5, 1903	█ Conservative	McBride
Charles Wilson	November 5, 1903	March 15, 1906	█ Conservative	McBride
Frederick John Fulton	March 15, 1906	July 24, 1907	█ Conservative	McBride
William John Bowser	July 24, 1907	December 15, 1915	█ Conservative	McBride
William John Bowser	December 15, 1915	November 23, 1916	█ Conservative	Bowser
Malcolm Archibald Macdonald	November 29, 1916	May 14, 1917	█ Liberal	Brewster
John Wallace de Beque Farris	May 14, 1917	March 1, 1918	█ Liberal	Brewster
John Wallace de Beque Farris	March 6, 1918	January 28, 1922	█ Liberal	Oliver
Alexander Malcolm Manson	January 28, 1922	August 17, 1927	█ Liberal	Oliver
Alexander Malcolm Manson	August 20, 1927	August 20, 1928	█ Liberal	MacLean
Robert Henry Pooley	August 21, 1928	November 15, 1933	█ Conservative	Tolmie
Gordon McGregor Sloan	November 15, 1933	April 5, 1937	█ Liberal	Pattullo
Duff Pattullo	April 5, 1937	July 5, 1937	█ Liberal	Pattullo
Gordon Sylvester Wismer	July 5, 1937	November 14, 1941	█ Liberal	Pattullo
Norman William Whittaker	November 14, 1941	November 19, 1941	█ Liberal	Pattullo
Duff Pattullo	November 24, 1941	December 9, 1941	█ Liberal	Pattullo
Royal Maitland	December 10, 1941	March 28, 1946	█ Conservative	Hart
Gordon Sylvester Wismer	March 28, 1946	December 29, 1947	█ Liberal	Hart
Gordon Sylvester Wismer	December 29, 1947	August 1, 1952	█ Liberal	Johnson
Robert Bonner	August 1, 1952	May 27, 1968	█ Social Credit	W. A. C. Bennett
Leslie Peterson	May 27, 1968	September 15, 1972	█ Social Credit	W. A. C. Bennett
Alexander Macdonald	September 15, 1972	December 22, 1975	█ New Democratic	Barrett
Garde Gardom	December 22, 1975	November 23, 1979	█ Social Credit	B. Bennett
Allan Williams	November 23, 1979	May 26, 1983	█ Social Credit	B. Bennett
Brian Smith	May 26, 1983	August 6, 1986	█ Social Credit	B. Bennett
Brian Smith	August 6, 1986	June 29, 1988	█ Social Credit	Vander Zalm
Elwood Veitch	June 29, 1988	August 6, 1988	█ Social Credit	Vander Zalm
Bud Smith	August 6, 1988	July 13, 1990	█ Social Credit	Vander Zalm
Russell Fraser	July 13, 1990	April 2, 1991	█ Social Credit	Vander Zalm
Russell Fraser	April 2, 1991	November 5, 1991	█ Social Credit	Johnston
Colin Gabelmann	November 5, 1991	August 16, 1995	█ New Democratic	Harcourt
Ujjal Dosanjh	August 16, 1995	February 22, 1996	█ New Democratic	Harcourt
Ujjal Dosanjh	February 28, 1996	August 25, 1999	█ New Democratic	G. Clark
Ujjal Dosanjh	August 25, 1999	February 24, 2000	█ New Democratic	Miller
Andrew Petter	February 29, 2000	November 1, 2000	█ New Democratic	Dosanjh
Graeme Bowbrick	November 1, 2000	June 5, 2001	█ New Democratic	Dosanjh
Geoff Plant	June 5, 2001	June 16, 2005	█ Liberal	Campbell
Wally Oppal	June 16, 2005	June 10, 2009	█ Liberal	Campbell
Mike de Jong	June 10, 2009	December 1, 2010	█ Liberal	Campbell
Barry Penner	December 1, 2010	March 14, 2011	█ Liberal	Campbell
Barry Penner	March 14, 2011	August 18, 2011	█ Liberal	C. Clark
Shirley Bond	August 18, 2011	June 10, 2013	█ Liberal	C. Clark
Suzanne Anton	June 10, 2013	June 12, 2017	█ Liberal	C. Clark
Andrew Wilkinson	June 12, 2017	July 18, 2017	█ Liberal	C. Clark
David Eby	July 18, 2017	July 19, 2022	█ New Democratic	Horgan
Murray Rankin	July 22, 2022	November 18, 2022	█ New Democratic	Horgan
Niki Sharma	December 7, 2022	November 20, 2026	█ New Democratic	Eby
Caroline Elliott	November 20, 2026	Incumbent	█ Conservative	Doerkson

== See also ==
- Justice ministry
- Politics of British Columbia
