= John McRae (British Columbia politician) =

Canadian politician

Member of the Legislative Assembly of British Columbia
- In office 1920–1924
- Preceded by: Joseph Walters
- Succeeded by: John Duncan MacLean
- Constituency: Yale

Personal details
- Born: October 10, 1864 Maxwell, Canada West
- Died: September 30, 1939 (aged 74) Agassiz, British Columbia
- Party: British Columbia Conservative Party
- Spouse: Ambie McRae
- Children: 8
- Occupation: farmer, contractor

John J. McRae (October 10, 1864 – September 30, 1939) was a Canadian politician. He served in the Legislative Assembly of British Columbia from 1920 until his defeat in the 1924 provincial election, from the electoral district of Yale, a member of the Conservative party. Following his defeat in 1924, he never sought reelection again to the Legislature. He also served as the Reeve of the District of Kent for 20 years.
