= De Cosmos ministry =

Cabinet of British Columbia, 1872–1874

- 2nd ministry of British Columbia
- Date formed: December 23, 1872
- Date dissolved: February 9, 1874

People and organisations
- Monarch: Victoria
- Lieutenant Governor: Joseph Trutch
- Premier: Amor De Cosmos
- Member parties: Non-partisan

History
- Election: None
- Legislature term: 1st Parliament of British Columbia
- Predecessor: McCreight ministry
- Successor: First Walkem ministry

The De Cosmos ministry was the combined Cabinet that governed British Columbia from December 23, 1872, to February 9, 1874. It was led by Amor De Cosmos, the second premier of British Columbia. The ministry was established after the McCreight ministry lost a motion of no-confidence on December 19, 1872, regarding poor administration of public affairs. De Cosmos's government was dissolved following his resignation, in order for him pursue a career in federal politics.

== List of ministers ==
De Cosmos ministry by portfolio
Portfolio	Minister	Tenure	
Portfolio	Minister	Start	End
Premier of British Columbia	Amor De Cosmos	December 23, 1872	February 9, 1874
President of the Council	Amor De Cosmos	December 23, 1872	February 9, 1874
Attorney General	George Anthony Walkem	December 23, 1872	February 9, 1874
Minister of Finance and Agriculture	William James Armstrong	February 28, 1873	February 9, 1874
Chief Commissioner of Lands and Works	Robert Beaven	December 23, 1872	February 9, 1874
Provincial Secretary	John Ash	December 23, 1872	February 9, 1874
Member without Portfolio	William James Armstrong	December 23, 1872	February 28, 1873

== New ministries ==
On February 4, 1873, the government announced its intention to create a fourth portfolio to handle financial matters. This was deemed necessary for efficiency, as "upon going into office, they had found great difficulty in arriving at particulars respecting finance". The minister would also have the duty of collecting information relevant to agriculture, in order to aid the development of the nascent sector. Prior to the establishment of this ministry, these duties had been the responsibility of provincial secretary. The government faced criticism over the new ministry, as they had come to office pledging to reduce spending, but emphasized that the new minister would replace several clerks and thus ultimately reduce costs. William James Armstrong was appointed the inaugural minister on February 28.
