= John William Fordham Johnson =

Canadian businessman and the 14th Lieutenant Governor of British Columbia

The Honourable John William Fordham Johnson
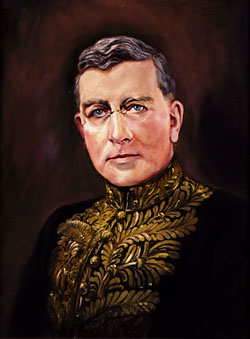
- John William Fordham Johnson during his time as Lieutenant Governor of British Columbia.

14th Lieutenant Governor of British Columbia
- In office July 18, 1931 – May 1, 1936
- Monarchs: George V Edward VIII
- Governors General: The Earl of Bessborough; The Lord Tweedsmuir
- Premier: Simon Fraser Tolmie; Duff Pattullo
- Preceded by: Robert Randolph Bruce
- Succeeded by: Eric Hamber

Personal details
- Born: November 28, 1866 Spalding, Lincolnshire, England
- Died: November 28, 1938 (aged 72) Vancouver, British Columbia, Canada
- Occupation: businessman
- Profession: Politician

John William Fordham Johnson (28 November 1866 – 28 November 1938) was a Canadian businessman and the 14th Lieutenant Governor of British Columbia.

Johnson was born in Spalding, Lincolnshire, England. He left the United Kingdom in 1888 and settled in Portland, Oregon where he worked for a bank. Ten years later, Johnson transferred to the Vancouver office of the bank. In 1900, Johnson quit and went to work for the B.C. Sugar Co., ultimately becoming president of that company in 1920.

Johnson was appointed as the Lieutenant Governor of British Columbia in 1931. He was sworn into office on August 1 of that year and served in the role until 1936. Johnson retired from the office in ill health and died in Vancouver two years later.

== Sources ==
- McGregor, D.A. (1967). They Gave Royal Assent - The Lieutenant-Governors of British Columbia. Mitchell Press Limited.
