= Barrett ministry =

Cabinet of British Columbia, 1972–1975

- 27th ministry of British Columbia
- Date formed: September 15, 1972
- Date dissolved: December 22, 1975

People and organisations
- Monarch: Elizabeth II
- Lieutenant Governor: John Robert Nicholson (1972–1973); Walter Stewart Owen (1973–1975)
- Premier: Dave Barrett
- Deputy Premier: Eileen Dailly
- Member party: New Democratic Party
- Status in legislature: Majority
- Opposition party: Social Credit
- Opposition leader: W.A.C. Bennett (1972–1973); Bill Bennett (1973–1975)

History
- Election: 1972
- Legislature term: 30th Parliament of British Columbia
- Predecessor: W.A.C. Bennett ministry
- Successor: Bill Bennett ministry

The Barrett ministry was the combined Cabinet (formally the Executive Council of British Columbia) that governed British Columbia from September 15, 1972, to December 22, 1975. It was led by Dave Barrett, the 26th premier of British Columbia, and consisted of members of the New Democratic Party.

The Barrett ministry was established after the 1972 British Columbia general election when long-time premier W. A. C. Bennett was defeated in the general election and Dave Barrett was elected as his successor. The cabinet governed through the 30th Parliament of British Columbia, until the New Democratic Party was defeated in the 1975 British Columbia general election. It was succeeded by the Bill Bennett ministry.

== List of ministers ==
Barrett ministry by portfolio
Portfolio	Minister	Tenure	
Portfolio	Minister	Start	End
Premier of British Columbia	Dave Barrett	September 15, 1972	December 22, 1975
Deputy Premier of British Columbia	Eileen Dailly	September 15, 1972	December 22, 1975
Minister of Agriculture	David Stupich	September 15, 1972	December 22, 1975
Attorney General	Alexander Macdonald	September 15, 1972	December 22, 1975
Minister of Consumer Services	Phyllis Young	November 8, 1973	December 22, 1975
Minister of Economic Development (Note: "Industrial Development, Trade and Commerce" from September 15, 1972 to June 20, 1974)	Alexander Macdonald	September 15, 1972	May 18, 1973
Minister of Economic Development	Gary Lauk	May 18, 1973	December 22, 1975
Minister of Education	Eileen Dailly	September 15, 1972	December 22, 1975
Minister of Finance	Dave Barrett	September 15, 1972	October 3, 1975
Minister of Finance	David Stupich	October 3, 1975	December 22, 1975
Minister of Health (Note: "Health Services and Hospital Insurance" from September 15, 1972 to November 7, 1973)	Dennis Cocke	September 15, 1972	December 22, 1975
Minister of Highways	Robert Strachan	September 15, 1972	May 18, 1973
Minister of Highways	Graham Lea	May 18, 1973	December 22, 1975
Minister of Housing	Lorne Nicolson	November 8, 1973	December 22, 1975
Minister of Human Resources (Note: "Rehabilitation and Social Development" from September 15, 1972 to May 1, 1973)	Norman Levi	September 15, 1972	December 22, 1975
Minister of Labour	Bill King	September 15, 1972	December 22, 1975
Minister of Lands, Forests, Water Resources	Robert Williams	September 15, 1972	December 22, 1975
Minister of Mines and Petroleum Resources	Leo Nimsick	September 15, 1972	October 3, 1975
Minister of Mines and Petroleum Resources	Gary Lauk	October 3, 1975	December 22, 1975
Minister of Municipal Affairs	Jim Lorimer	September 15, 1972	December 22, 1975
Provincial Secretary	Ernest Hall	September 15, 1972	December 22, 1975
Minister of Public Works	Bill Hartley	September 15, 1972	December 22, 1975
Minister of Recreation and Conservation	Robert Arthur Williams	September 15, 1972	May 18, 1973
Minister of Recreation and Conservation	Jack Radford	May 18, 1973	December 22, 1975
Minister of Transport and Communications (Note: "Commercial Transport" from September 15, 1972 to May 18, 1973; "Commercial Transport and Communications" from May 18, 1973 to May 25, 1973)	Jim Lorimer	September 15, 1972	May 18, 1973
Minister of Transport and Communications	Robert Strachan	May 18, 1973	October 3, 1975
Minister of Transport and Communications	Carl Liden	October 3, 1975	December 22, 1975
Minister of Travel Industry	Ernest Hall	September 15, 1972	October 3, 1975
Minister of Travel Industry	Leo Nimsick	October 3, 1975	December 22, 1975
Minister without Portfolio	Frank Calder	September 15, 1972	July 31, 1973
Minister without Portfolio	Lorne Nicolson	May 18, 1973	November 8, 1973
Minister without Portfolio	Phyllis Young	May 18, 1973	November 8, 1973
Minister without Portfolio	Alf Nunweiler	June 25, 1974	December 22, 1975
