= William Curtis Shelly =

Canadian politician

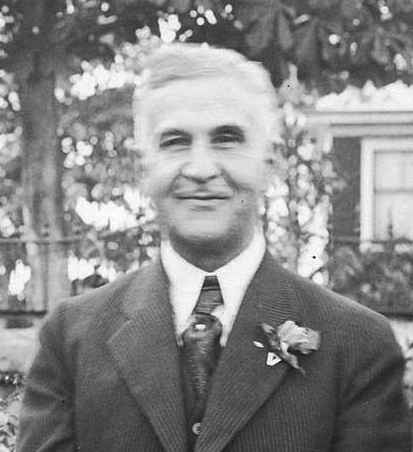
- Shelly pictured c. 1931

MLA for Vancouver City
- In office 1928–1933

Personal details
- Born: September 17, 1878 Ontario
- Died: August 13, 1951 (aged 72) Vancouver, British Columbia
- Party: Conservative

William Curtis Shelly (September 17, 1878 – August 13, 1951) was a businessman and political figure in British Columbia. He represented Vancouver City from 1928 to 1933 in the Legislative Assembly of British Columbia as a Conservative. He was also a Park Board commissioner and board chairman (1920-1927).

He was born in Ontario in 1878 and moved to Vancouver to expand his bakery business. Shelly's bakery was known for its "Four-X bread". During the 1920s, he helped create a conglomerate known as Canadian Bakeries Ltd. to which he sold his business. Shelly became vice-president and general manager of the new company. He was also president of the Home Oil Co. Ltd., Canada Grain Export Co. Ltd., Guaranty Savings and Loan, Crescent Beach Development Co. Ltd., Grouse Mountain Highway and Scenic Resort Ltd. and the Shelly Building.

Shelly served as finance minister in the provincial cabinet. In the fiscal year 1929/1930, the province suffered a fairly small deficit of $135,000. Shelly projected an increase of government revenues and a small surplus for the following fiscal year; instead, revenues decreased and expenditures were larger than projected, resulting in a then-record deficit of $4.8 million. Shelly was transferred to the position of president of the executive council in October 1930. Between 1928 and 1930 he also served as minister of industries. He suffered a large personal financial loss when share prices for Home Oil Co. Ltd. bottomed out in the years following the stock market crash. He retired from politics in 1933. Shelly died in Vancouver at the age of 72.
