= Eby ministry =

Cabinet of British Columbia since 2022

- 37th ministry of British Columbia

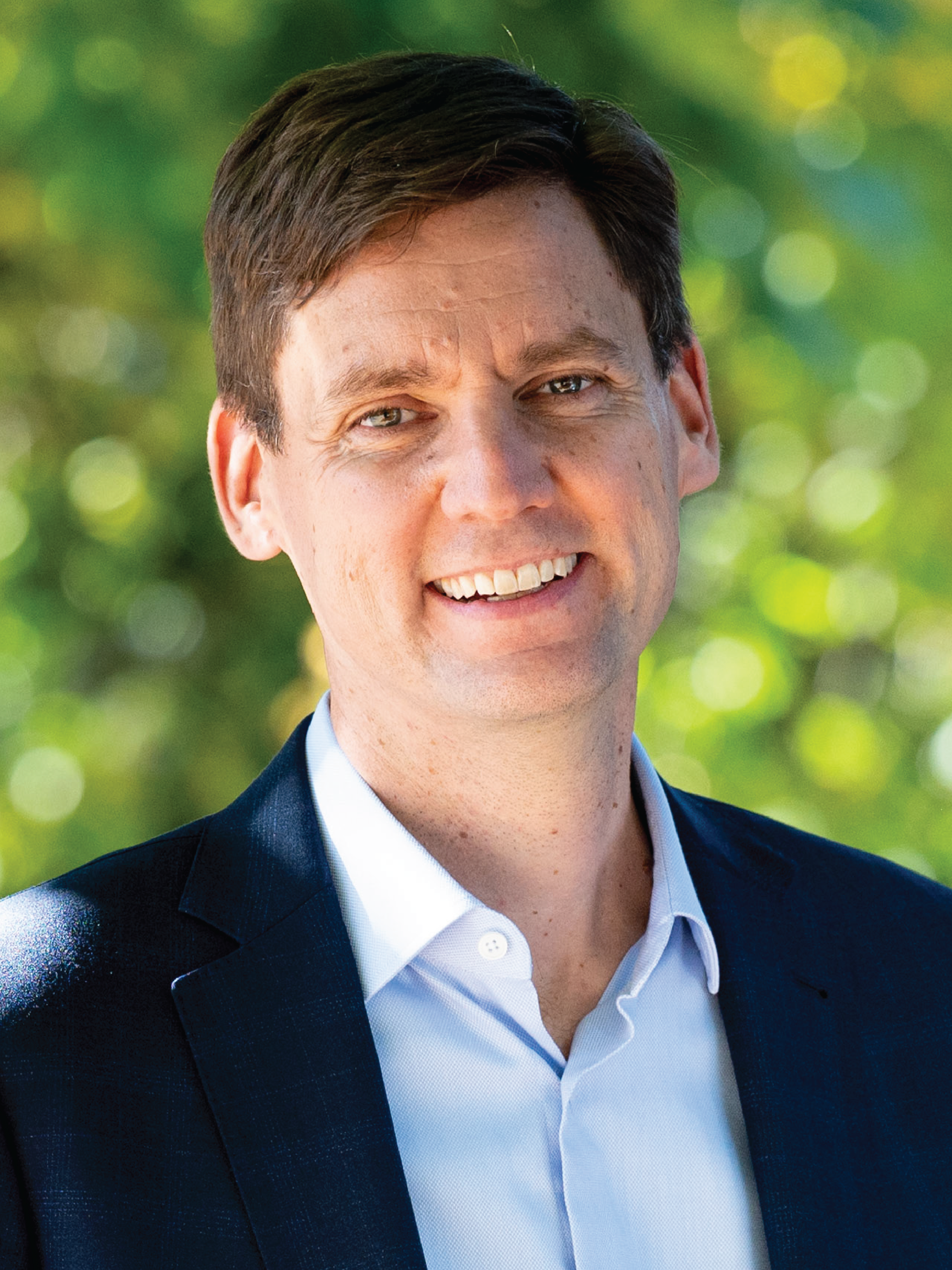
- David Eby in 2022
- Date formed: November 18, 2022
- Date dissolved: November 20, 2026

People and organizations
- Monarch: Charles III
- Lieutenant governor: Janet Austin (2022–2025); Wendy Lisogar-Cocchia (2025–present)
- Premier: David Eby
- Deputy premier: Mike Farnworth (2022–2024); Niki Sharma (2024–2026)
- No. of ministers: 28
- Ministers removed: 1
- Total no. of members: 41
- Member party: New Democratic
- Status in legislature: Majority
- Opposition cabinet: 42nd (2022–2024); 43rd (2024–present)
- Opposition party: BC United (Note: Known as the British Columbia Liberal Party until April 12, 2023) (2022–2024); Conservative (2024–2026)
- Opposition leader: Kevin Falcon (2022–2024); John Rustad (2024–2025); Trevor Halford (2025–2026); Heather Maahs (2026); Lorne Doerkson (2026)

History
- Incoming formation: 2022 NDP leadership election
- Outgoing formation: 2026 general election
- Election: 2024
- Legislature terms: 42nd Parliament; 43rd Parliament
- Predecessor: Horgan ministry
- Successor: Doerkson ministry

The Eby ministry was the combined Cabinet (formally the Executive Council of British Columbia) that governed British Columbia from November 18, 2022 to November 20, 2026. It was chaired by the 37th premier of British Columbia, David Eby. The Cabinet was made up of members of the British Columbia New Democratic Party (NDP), which commanded a majority in the Legislative Assembly of British Columbia.

The ministry replaced the Horgan ministry after John Horgan stepped down as premier and NDP leader and Eby was selected to succeed him. Eby was sworn into office on November 18, 2022, and appointed his first cabinet on December 7, 2022. (Note: Horgan's outgoing cabinet continued in their roles until Eby announced his own cabinet. However, those ministers are not considered to have been part of the Eby ministry.)

In November 2024, he revealed his new cabinet following the 2024 British Columbia general election.

Following the NDP's defeat in the 2026 British Columbia general election, it was replaced by the Doerkson ministry.

== List of ministers ==
Eby ministry by portfolio
Portfolio	Minister	Tenure	
Portfolio	Minister	Start	End
Premier of British Columbia	David Eby	November 18, 2022	November 20, 2026
Minister of State for Local Government and Rural Communities	Brittny Anderson	November 18, 2024	November 20, 2026
Deputy Premier of British Columbia	Mike Farnworth	December 7, 2022	November 18, 2024
Deputy Premier of British Columbia	Niki Sharma	November 18, 2024	November 20, 2026
Minister of Agriculture and Food	Pam Alexis	December 7, 2022	November 18, 2024
Minister of Agriculture and Food	Lana Popham	November 18, 2024	November 20, 2026
Attorney General	Niki Sharma	December 7, 2022	November 20, 2026
Minister of Children and Family Development	Mitzi Dean	December 7, 2022	January 15, 2024
Minister of Children and Family Development	Grace Lore	January 15, 2024	December 10, 2024
Minister of Children and Family Development	Jodie Wickens	December 10, 2024	November 20, 2026
Minister of Citizens' Services	Lisa Beare	December 7, 2022	February 20, 2024
Minister of Citizens' Services	George Chow	February 20, 2024	July 17, 2025
Minister of Citizens' Services	Diana Gibson	July 17, 2025	November 20, 2026
Minister of Education and Child Care	Rachna Singh	December 7, 2022	November 18, 2024
Minister of Education and Child Care	Lisa Beare	November 18, 2024	November 20, 2026
Minister of State for Child Care	Grace Lore	December 7, 2022	January 15, 2024
Minister of State for Child Care	Mitzi Dean	January 15, 2024	November 18, 2024
Minister of State for Child Care and Children and Youth with Support Needs	Jodie Wickens	November 18, 2024	November 20, 2026
Minister of Emergency Management and Climate Readiness	Bowinn Ma	December 7, 2022	November 18, 2024
Minister of Emergency Management and Climate Readiness	Kelly Greene	November 18, 2024	November 20, 2026
Minister of Energy and Climate Solutions	Adrian Dix	November 18, 2024	November 20, 2026
Minister of Energy, Mines and Low Carbon Innovation	Josie Osborne	December 7, 2022	November 18, 2024
Minister of Environment and Climate Change Strategy	George Heyman	December 7, 2022	November 18, 2024
Minister of Environment and Parks	Tamara Davidson	November 18, 2024	November 20, 2026
Minister of Finance	Katrine Conroy	December 7, 2022	November 18, 2024
Minister of Finance	Brenda Bailey	November 18, 2024	August 14, 2026
Minister of Finance	Josie Osborne	August 14, 2026	November 20, 2026
Minister of Forests	Bruce Ralston	December 7, 2022	November 18, 2024
Minister of Forests	Ravi Parmar	November 18, 2024	November 20, 2026
Minister of State for Sustainable Forestry Innovation	Andrew Mercier	January 15, 2024	November 18, 2024
Minister responsible for Francophone Affairs	Adrian Dix	December 7, 2022	November 20, 2026
Minister of Health	Adrian Dix	December 7, 2022	November 18, 2024
Minister of Health	Josie Osborne	November 18, 2024	August 14, 2026
Minister of Health	Ravi Kahlon	August 14, 2026	November 20, 2026
Minister of Housing	Ravi Kahlon	December 7, 2022	November 18, 2024
Minister of Housing and Municipal Affairs	Ravi Kahlon	November 18, 2024	July 17, 2025
Minister of Housing and Municipal Affairs	Christine Boyle	July 17, 2025	November 20, 2026
Minister of Indigenous Relations and Reconciliation	Murray Rankin	December 7, 2022	November 18, 2024
Minister of Indigenous Relations and Reconciliation	Christine Boyle	November 18, 2024	July 17, 2025
Minister of Indigenous Relations and Reconciliation	Spencer Chandra Herbert	July 17, 2025	November 20, 2026
Minister of Infrastructure	Bowinn Ma	November 18, 2024	November 20, 2026
Minister of Jobs, Economic Development and Innovation	Brenda Bailey	December 7, 2022	November 18, 2024
Minister of Jobs, Economic Development and Innovation	Diana Gibson	November 18, 2024	July 17, 2025
Minister of Jobs, Economic Development and Innovation	Brenda Bailey	August 14, 2026	November 20, 2026
Minister of Jobs and Economic Growth	Ravi Kahlon	July 17, 2025	August 14, 2026
Minister of State for Trade	Jagrup Brar	December 7, 2022	November 18, 2024
Minister of State for Trade	Rick Glumac	November 18, 2024	July 17, 2025
Minister of State for Artificial Intelligence and New Technologies	Rick Glumac	July 17, 2025	November 20, 2026
Minister of Labour	Harry Bains	December 7, 2022	November 18, 2024
Minister of Labour	Jennifer Whiteside	November 18, 2024	November 20, 2026
Minister of Mental Health and Addictions	Jennifer Whiteside	December 7, 2022	November 18, 2024
Minister of Mining and Critical Minerals	Jagrup Brar	November 18, 2024	November 20, 2026
Minister of Municipal Affairs	Anne Kang	December 7, 2022	November 18, 2024
Minister of Post-Secondary Education and Future Skills	Selina Robinson	December 7, 2022	February 5, 2024
Minister of Post-Secondary Education and Future Skills	Lisa Beare	February 20, 2024	November 18, 2024
Minister of Post-Secondary Education and Future Skills	Anne Kang	November 18, 2024	July 17, 2025
Minister of Post-Secondary Education and Future Skills	Jessie Sunner	July 17, 2025	November 20, 2026
Minister of State for Workplace Development	Andrew Mercier	December 7, 2022	January 15, 2024
Minister of Public Safety and Solicitor General	Mike Farnworth	December 7, 2022	November 18, 2024
Minister of Public Safety and Solicitor General	Garry Begg	November 18, 2024	July 17, 2025
Minister of Public Safety and Solicitor General	Nina Krieger	July 17, 2025	November 20, 2026
Minister of State for Community Safety and Integrated Services	Terry Yung	November 18, 2024	November 20, 2026
Minister of Social Development and Poverty Reduction	Sheila Malcolmson	December 7, 2022	November 20, 2026
Minister of Tourism, Arts, Culture and Sport	Lana Popham	December 7, 2022	November 18, 2024
Minister of Tourism, Arts, Culture and Sport	Spencer Chandra Herbert	November 18, 2024	July 17, 2025
Minister of Tourism, Arts, Culture and Sport	Anne Kang	July 17, 2025	November 20, 2026
Minister of Transportation and Infrastructure	Rob Fleming	December 7, 2022	November 18, 2024
Minister of Transportation and Transit	Mike Farnworth	November 18, 2024	November 20, 2026
Minister of State for Infrastructure and Transit	Dan Coulter	December 7, 2022	November 18, 2024
Minister of Water, Land and Resource Stewardship	Nathan Cullen	December 7, 2022	November 18, 2024
Minister of Water, Land and Resource Stewardship	Randene Neill	November 18, 2024	November 20, 2026
Government House Leader	Ravi Kahlon	December 7, 2022	November 18, 2024
Government House Leader	Mike Farnworth	November 18, 2024	November 20, 2026

== Cabinet composition and shuffles ==
After being sworn in on November 18, 2022, Eby announced his new cabinet on December 7, 2022. His cabinet consisted of 23 ministers and four ministers of state, and established two new ministries: a standalone Ministry of Housing and the Ministry of Emergency Management and Climate Readiness. Among the changes, former forests minister Katrine Conroy was named the new finance minister; Ravi Kahlon, former jobs minister and a close ally of Eby's, became the inaugural housing minister; Bowinn Ma, formerly minister of state for infrastructure, moved to the new emergency management ministry; and Niki Sharma, former parliamentary secretary for community development, was promoted to Attorney General. A total of eight ministers were elevated from parliamentary secretary or the backbenches — Sharma, Pam Alexis, Brenda Bailey, Jagrup Brar, Dan Coulter, Grace Lore, Andrew Mercier and Rachna Singh — while eight ministers kept the portfolios they held under Horgan: Harry Bains, Lisa Beare, Mitzi Dean, Adrian Dix, Mike Farnworth, Rob Fleming, George Heyman and Murray Rankin. After the shuffle, Eby's cabinet included more women than men.

Two cabinet ministers were replaced in 2024. On January 15, Mitzi Dean was dropped as minister of children and family development, with Grace Lore appointed as her replacement. Dean took Lore's old position as minister of state for child care. Additionally, Andrew Mercier's responsibility changed from workplace development to sustainable forestry innovation. On February 5, Selina Robinson was dismissed as minister of post-secondary education after comments about Palestine; Brenda Bailey assumed the duties of the ministry until a full replacement was named. Two weeks later, on February 20, Lisa Beare was named the new post-secondary minister, and George Chow took over Beare's old portfolio of citizens' services.

Following the 2024 election, Eby shuffled his cabinet. At 27 ministers (including four ministers of state), it was the same size as the previous cabinet. As only 15 ministers had been re-elected, 12 members joined cabinet: Brittny Anderson, Garry Begg, Christine Boyle, Spencer Chandra Herbert, Tamara Davidson, Diana Gibson, Rick Glumac, Kelly Greene, Randene Neill, Ravi Parmar, Jodie Wickens and Terry Yung. Among the returning ministers, Sharma was promoted to deputy premier while remaining attorney general, Bailey was named the new minister of finance, Dix became minister of energy and climate solutions, Farnworth took over transportation and transit as well as house leader, and Kahlon retained the housing portfolio but gained responsibility for municipal affairs. Several responsibilities were shifted around, merged or split to new ministries, including transportation and infrastructure being split in two and municipal affairs being combined with housing. Two new ministry of state were created, one for mining and one for local governments and rural communities, while the ministry of mental health and addictions was abolished and the responsibility returned to the purview of the minister of health.

On December 10, 2024, Lore resigned from cabinet due to health issues; Wickens took over as minister of children and family development.

On July 17, 2025, Eby announced a small cabinet shuffle. Six ministers changed portfolios: Kahlon moved from housing to jobs; Gibson moved from jobs to citizens' services; Boyle moved from Indigenous relations to housing; Chandra Herbert moved to Indigenous relations; Kang moved to tourism, culture, arts and sports; and Glumac's post was modified to artificial intelligence and new technologies. Jessie Sunner and Nina Krieger joined cabinet, respectively as the new minister of post-secondary education and the new minister of public safety, while Beggs and Chow returned to the backbenches.

On August 14, 2026, Eby conducted a minor cabinet shuffle after Bailey announced her cancer diagnosis. Bailey, Josie Osborne, and Kahlon were appointed to new roles.
