= Bowser ministry =

Cabinet of British Columbia, 1916–1918

- 17th ministry of British Columbia
- Date formed: December 15, 1915
- Date dissolved: November 23, 1916

People and organisations
- Monarch: George V
- Lieutenant Governor: Francis Stillman Barnard
- Premier: William John Bowser
- Member parties: Conservative Party
- Status in legislature: Majority
- Opposition party: Liberal Party
- Opposition leader: Harlan Carey Brewster

History
- Election: None (appointed)
- Legislature term: 13th Parliament of British Columbia
- Predecessor: McBride ministry
- Successor: Brewster ministry

The Bowser ministry was the combined Cabinet (formally the Executive Council of British Columbia) that governed British Columbia from December 15, 1915, to November 23, 1916. It was led by William John Bowser, the 17th premier of British Columbia, and was composed of members of the Conservative Party.

The Bowser ministry was established following the resignation of previous premier Richard McBride on December 15, 1915. It was disestablished after the party was defeated in the 1916 election.

== List of ministers ==
Bowser ministry by portfolio
Portfolio	Minister	Tenure	
Portfolio	Minister	Start	End
Premier of British Columbia	William John Bowser	December 15, 1915	November 23, 1916
President of the Council	William Manson	December 15, 1915	June 5, 1916
President of the Council	Ernest Miller	June 5, 1916	November 23, 1916
Minister of Agriculture	William Manson	June 5, 1916	November 23, 1916
Attorney General	William John Bowser	December 15, 1915	November 23, 1916
Minister of Finance (Note: "Finance and Agriculture" from December 15, 1915 to June 5, 1916)	Alfred Cornelius Flumerfelt	December 15, 1915	March 17, 1916
Minister of Finance	Lorne Argyle Campbell	March 17, 1916	July 17, 1916
Minister of Finance	Alexander Stewart	July 17, 1916	November 23, 1916
Minister of Lands	William Roderick Ross	December 15, 1915	November 23, 1916
Minister of Mines	Lorne Argyle Campbell	December 15, 1915	November 23, 1916
Provincial Secretary/Minister of Education	Thomas Taylor	December 15, 1915	June 6, 1916
Provincial Secretary/Minister of Education	George Albert McGuire	June 6, 1916	November 23, 1916
Minister of Public Works	Charles Edward Tisdall	December 15, 1915	March 1, 1916
Minister of Public Works	Thomas Taylor	March 1, 1916	November 23, 1916
Minister of Railways	Charles Edward Tisdall	December 15, 1915	March 1, 1916
Minister of Railways	Thomas Taylor	March 1, 1916	November 23, 1916
