= Beaven ministry =

Cabinet of British Columbia, 1882–1883

- 6th ministry of British Columbia
- Date formed: June 13, 1882
- Date dissolved: January 29, 1883

People and organisations
- Monarch: Victoria
- Lieutenant Governor: Clement Francis Cornwall
- Premier: Robert Beaven
- No. of ministers: 3
- Ministers removed: 1
- Total no. of members: 4
- Member parties: Non-partisan

History
- Election: 1882
- Legislature term: 4th Parliament
- Predecessor: Second Walkem ministry
- Successor: Smithe ministry

The Beaven ministry was the combined Cabinet that governed British Columbia from June 13, 1882, to January 29, 1883. It was led by Robert Beaven, the sixth premier of British Columbia. Beaven, a member of the preceding second Walkem ministry, had been named the new premier after George Anthony Walkem resigned as premier to accept a judicial appointment. Beaven led his government into the 1882 general election but it fared poorly. After attempting to carry on in office with a reduced number of supporters, Beaven lost a motion of no confidence. The ministry was thus replaced by the Smithe ministry.

== List of ministers ==
Beaven ministry by portfolio
Portfolio	Minister	Tenure	
Portfolio	Minister	Start	End
Premier of British Columbia	Robert Beaven	June 13, 1882	January 29, 1883
President of the Council	Robert Beaven	June 13, 1882	January 29, 1883
Attorney General	John Roland Hett	June 13, 1882	January 29, 1883
Minister of Finance and Agriculture	Robert Beaven	June 13, 1882	January 29, 1883
Chief Commissioner of Lands and Works	Robert Beaven	June 13, 1882	January 29, 1883
Minister of Mines	Thomas Basil Humphreys	June 13, 1882	August 22, 1882
Minister of Mines	William James Armstrong	August 22, 1882	January 29, 1883
Provincial Secretary	Thomas Basil Humphreys	June 13, 1882	August 22, 1882
Provincial Secretary	William James Armstrong	August 22, 1882	January 29, 1883
