= Smithe ministry =

Cabinet of British Columbia, 1883–1887

- 7th ministry of British Columbia
- Date formed: January 29, 1883
- Date dissolved: March 28, 1887

People and organisations
- Monarch: Victoria
- Lieutenant Governor: Clement Francis Cornwall (1883–1887); Hugh Nelson (1887)
- Premier: William Smithe
- No. of ministers: 4
- Ministers removed: 2
- Total no. of members: 5
- Member parties: Non-partisan

History
- Election: 1886
- Legislature terms: 4th Parliament; 5th Parliament
- Predecessor: Beaven ministry
- Successor: A. E. B. Davie ministry

The Smithe ministry was the combined Cabinet that governed British Columbia from January 29, 1883, to March 28, 1887. It was led by William Smithe, the seventh premier of British Columbia. The ministry was formed in the aftermath of the 1882 election, in which Smithe and his supporters won a comfortable majority. Smithe died in 1887 and was succeeded as premier by Attorney General Alexander Edmund Batson Davie, who formed the A. E. B. Davie ministry.

== List of ministers ==
Beaven ministry by portfolio
Portfolio	Minister	Tenure	
Portfolio	Minister	Start	End
Premier of British Columbia	William Smithe	January 29, 1883	March 28, 1887
President of the Council	Montague Tyrwhitt-Drake	January 29, 1883	December 9, 1884
President of the Council	William Smithe	December 9, 1884	March 28, 1887
Attorney General	Alexander Edmund Batson Davie	January 29, 1883	March 28, 1887
Minister of Finance and Agriculture	John Robson	January 29, 1883	March 21, 1885
Minister of Finance and Agriculture	Simeon Duck	March 21, 1885	October 16, 1887
Minister of Finance and Agriculture	John Robson	March 21, 1885	March 28, 1887
Chief Commissioner of Lands and Works	William Smithe	January 29, 1883	March 28, 1887
Minister of Mines	John Robson	January 29, 1883	March 28, 1887
Provincial Secretary	John Robson	January 29, 1883	March 28, 1887
