= McBride ministry =

Cabinet of British Columbia, 1903–1915

- 16th ministry of British Columbia
- Date formed: June 1, 1903
- Date dissolved: December 15, 1915

People and organisations
- Monarch: Edward VII (1903–10); George V (1910–15)
- Lieutenant Governor: Henri-Gustave Joly de Lotbinière(1903–06); James Dunsmuir (1906–09); Thomas Wilson Paterson (1909–14); Francis Stillman Barnard (1914–15)
- Premier: Richard McBride
- Member party: Conservative
- Status in legislature: Majority; 22 / 42 (1903–1907); 26 / 42 (1907–1909); 38 / 42 (1909–1912); 39 / 42 (1912–1916)
- Opposition party: Liberal Party (1903–10, 1911-12); Socialist (1910, 1913–15)
- Opposition leader: James Alexander MacDonald (1903–09); John Oliver (1909–10); James Hurst Hawthornthwaite (1910); Harlan Carey Brewster (1911–12); Parker Williams (1913–15)

History
- Elections: 1903, 1907, 1909, 1912
- Legislature terms: 9th Parliament of British Columbia; 10th Parliament of British Columbia; 11th Parliament of British Columbia; 12th Parliament of British Columbia; 13th Parliament of British Columbia
- Predecessor: Prior ministry
- Successor: Bowser ministry

The McBride ministry was the combined Cabinet (formally the Executive Council of British Columbia) that governed British Columbia from June 1, 1903, to December 15, 1915. It was led by Richard McBride, the 16th premier of British Columbia. In a break from the previous non-partisan governments, it was the first to be composed on party lines, and consisted of members of the Conservative Party.

The McBride ministry was first elected in the 1903 election. It was disestablished upon McBride's resignation in 1915, and was succeeded by the Bowser ministry.

== List of ministers ==
McBride ministry by portfolio
Portfolio	Minister	Tenure	
Portfolio	Minister	Start	End
Premier of British Columbia	Richard McBride	June 1, 1903	December 15, 1915
President of the Council	Robert Garnett Tatlow	June 2, 1903	June 4, 1903
President of the Council	Charles Wilson	June 8, 1903	November 5, 1903
President of the Council	Frederick John Fulton	November 5, 1903	June 6, 1904
President of the Council	Francis Lovett Carter-Cotton	June 6, 1904	October 10, 1910
President of the Council	Albert Edward McPhillips	October 10, 1910	September 25, 1913
President of the Council	Vacant	September 25, 1913	November 1913
President of the Council	Richard McBride	November 1913	December 15, 1915
Attorney General	Albert Edward McPhillips	June 4, 1903	November 5, 1903
Attorney General	Charles Wilson	November 5, 1903	March 15, 1906
Attorney General	Frederick John Fulton	March 15, 1906	July 24, 1907
Attorney General	William John Bowser	July 24, 1907	December 15, 1915
Minister of Finance and Agriculture	Robert Garnett Tatlow	June 4, 1903	October 21, 1909
Minister of Finance and Agriculture	William John Bowser	October 21, 1909	October 10, 1910
Minister of Finance and Agriculture	Price Ellison	October 10, 1910	March 8, 1915
Minister of Finance and Agriculture	William John Bowser	March 9, 1915	December 15, 1915
Minister of Lands (Note: "Chief Commissioner of Lands and Works" from June 1, 1903 to December 22, 1908; "Chief Commissioner of Lands" from December 22, 1908 to March 1, 1911)	Richard McBride	June 2, 1903	November 5, 1903
Minister of Lands	Robert Francis Green	November 5, 1903	December 23, 1906
Minister of Lands	Robert Garnett Tatlow	December 23, 1906	March 7, 1907
Minister of Lands	Frederick John Fulton	March 7, 1907	October 21, 1909
Minister of Lands	Price Ellison	November 1, 1909	October 10, 1910
Minister of Lands	William Roderick Ross	October 10, 1910	December 15, 1915
Minister of Mines	Robert Francis Green	June 4, 1903	November 5, 1903
Minister of Mines	Richard McBride	November 5, 1903	December 15, 1915
Provincial Secretary / Minister of Education	Robert Francis Green	June 8, 1903	September 18, 1903
Provincial Secretary / Minister of Education	Arthur Samuel Goodeve	September 18, 1903	November 2, 1903
Provincial Secretary / Minister of Education	Richard McBride	November 5, 1903	May 18, 1904
Provincial Secretary / Minister of Education	Frederick John Fulton	May 18, 1904	December 31, 1906
Provincial Secretary / Minister of Education	William Manson	December 31, 1906	February 27, 1907
Provincial Secretary / Minister of Education	Henry Esson Young	February 27, 1907	December 15, 1915
Minister of Public Works	Thomas Taylor	December 22, 1908	December 15, 1915
Minister of Railways	Thomas Taylor	March 10, 1911	December 15, 1915
