= Alexander Malcolm Manson =

Canadian politician

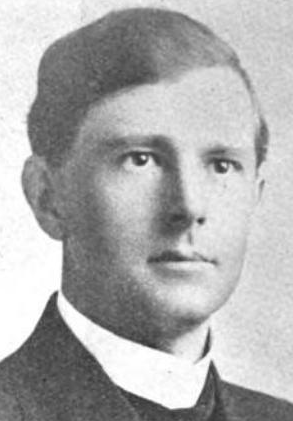

Justice of the Supreme Court of British Columbia
- In office 1936–1961

Attorney General and Minister of Labour of British Columbia
- In office April 12, 1922 – August 17, 1927

Member of the Legislative Assembly of British Columbia
- In office 1916–1935
- Constituency: Omineca

Personal details
- Born: October 7, 1883 St. Louis, Missouri, United States
- Died: September 25, 1964 (aged 80) Vancouver, British Columbia, Canada
- Party: Liberal
- Spouse: Stella Beckwith (m. 1909)
- Children: 3
- Education: University of Toronto; Osgoode Hall Law School
- Occupation: Jurist, politician

Alexander Malcolm Manson (October 7, 1883 – September 25, 1964) was a British Columbia judge and politician in the Liberal Party. Positions he held included Speaker, Minister of Labour and Attorney General. He was later appointed to the Supreme Court of British Columbia.

== Biography ==
Alexander Malcolm Manson was born in St. Louis, Missouri on October 7, 1883. After completing a bachelor's degree at the University of Toronto, Manson studied at Osgoode Hall Law School. In 1908, he became the first lawyer to practice in Prince Rupert, British Columbia. He married Stella Beckwith on June 29, 1909.

After being an unsuccessful candidate in the 1912 provincial election, he represented the district of Omineca in the BC Legislature for five terms from 1916 to 1935. He was Deputy Speaker of the Legislature from 1918 to 1921 (and again in 1935) and then Speaker of the Legislative Assembly in 1921. From April 12, 1922, to August 17, 1927, he was both Attorney General and Minister of Labour in John Oliver's Liberal government. As Attorney General, he was criticized for his handling of the 1924 Janet Smith murder case, which would damage his political career. Nevertheless, he continued in this dual role in John Duncan MacLean's government from 20 August 1927 to 20 August 1928. His legislative work included interest in liquor laws, narcotics laws, the Pacific Great Eastern Railway, and game conservation laws.

In the mid-1920s, he also served as Grand Master of the Grand Lodge of British Columbia and Yukon.

In 1935, he attempted to enter federal politics, running for the Liberal Party of Canada in the riding of Vancouver South, but lost by less than 300 votes to Conservative Howard Charles Green.

He served on the Supreme Court of British Columbia from 1936 until he retired in 1961.

He died from cancer in Vancouver on September 25, 1964.
