= Robson ministry =

Cabinet of British Columbia, 1889–1892

- 9th ministry of British Columbia
- Date formed: August 2, 1889
- Date dissolved: June 29, 1892

People and organisations
- Monarch: Victoria
- Lieutenant Governor: Hugh Nelson
- Premier: John Robson
- No. of ministers: 6
- Member parties: Non-partisan

History
- Election: 1890
- Legislature terms: 5th Parliament; 6th Parliament
- Incoming formation: Death of A. E. B. Davie
- Outgoing formation: Death of John Robson
- Predecessor: A. E. B. Davie ministry
- Successor: Theodore Davie ministry

The Robson ministry was the combined Cabinet that governed British Columbia from August 2, 1889, to June 29, 1892. It was led by John Robson, the ninth premier of British Columbia. Robson was appointed as premier following the death of incumbent premier A. E. B. Davie. Robson's cabinet was dissolved in 1892, when an accident during a trip to London, England, caused his premature death.

== List of ministers ==
Robson ministry by portfolio
Portfolio	Minister	Tenure	
Portfolio	Minister	Start	End
Premier of British Columbia	John Robson	August 2, 1889	June 29, 1892
President of the Council	Charles Edward Pooley	August 3, 1889	June 29, 1892
Attorney General	Theodore Davie	August 3, 1889	June 29, 1892
Minister of Finance and Agriculture	John Herbert Turner	August 2, 1889	June 29, 1892
Minister of Education and Immigration	James Baker	May 28, 1892	June 29, 1892
Chief Commissioner of Lands and Works	Forbes George Vernon	August 2, 1889	June 29, 1892
Minister of Mines	John Robson	August 2, 1889	June 29, 1892
Provincial Secretary	John Robson	August 2, 1889	June 29, 1892
