= Harcourt ministry =

Cabinet of British Columbia, 1991–1996

- 30th ministry of British Columbia

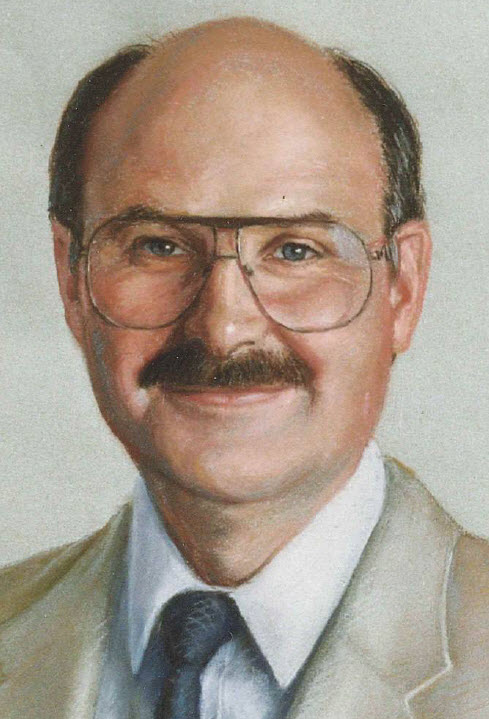
- Date formed: November 5, 1991
- Date dissolved: February 22, 1996

People and organisations
- Monarch: Elizabeth II
- Lieutenant Governor: David Lam (1991–1995); Garde Gardom (1995–1996)
- Premier: Mike Harcourt
- Deputy Premier: Anita Hagen (1991–1993); Elizabeth Cull (1993–1996)
- Member party: New Democratic Party
- Status in legislature: Majority
- Opposition party: Liberal Party
- Opposition leader: Gordon Wilson (1991–1993); Fred Gingell (1993–1994); Gordon Campbell (1994–1996)

History
- Election: 1991
- Legislature term: 35th Parliament of British Columbia
- Predecessor: Johnston ministry
- Successor: Glen Clark ministry

The Harcourt ministry was the combined Cabinet (formally the Executive Council of British Columbia) that governed British Columbia from November 5, 1991, to February 22, 1996. It was led by Mike Harcourt, the 30th premier of British Columbia, and consisted of members of the New Democratic Party (NDP).

The Harcourt ministry was established following the 1991 British Columbia general election, in which the NDP won a majority government. It governed for the majority of the 35th Parliament of British Columbia, until Harcourt announced his resignation in November 1995, pending a leadership election. The Harcourt ministry was disestablished on February 22, 1996, and succeeded by the Glen Clark ministry.

== List of ministers ==
Harcourt ministry by portfolio
Portfolio	Minister	Tenure	
Portfolio	Minister	Start	End
Premier of British Columbia	Mike Harcourt	November 5, 1991	February 22, 1996
Deputy Premier of British Columbia	Anita Hagen	November 5, 1991	September 15, 1993
Deputy Premier of British Columbia	Elizabeth Cull	September 15, 1993	February 22, 1996
Minister of Aboriginal Affairs	Andrew Petter	November 5, 1991	September 15, 1993
Minister of Aboriginal Affairs	John Cashore	September 15, 1993	February 22, 1996
Minister of Advanced Education, Training and Technology	Tom Perry	November 5, 1991	September 15, 1993
Minister of Agriculture, Fisheries and Food	Bill Barlee	November 5, 1991	September 15, 1993
Minister of Agriculture, Fisheries and Food	David Zirnhelt	September 15, 1993	February 22, 1996
Attorney General	Colin Gabelmann	November 5, 1991	August 16, 1995
Attorney General	Ujjal Dosanjh	August 16, 1995	February 22, 1996
Minister responsible for Constitutional Affairs	Moe Sihota	November 5, 1991	September 15, 1993
Minister responsible for Culture	Darlene Marzari	November 5, 1991	September 15, 1993
Minister of Economic Development, Small Business and Trade	David Zirnhelt	November 5, 1991	September 15, 1993
Minister of Education	Anita Hagen	November 5, 1991	September 15, 1993
Minister of Education	Arthur Charbonneau	September 15, 1993	February 22, 1996
Minister of Employment and Investment	Glen Clark	September 15, 1993	February 22, 1996
Minister of Energy, Mines and Petroleum Resources	Anne Edwards	November 5, 1991	February 22, 1996
Minister of Environment, Lands and Parks	John Cashore	November 5, 1991	September 15, 1993
Minister of Environment, Lands and Parks	Moe Sihota	September 15, 1993	May 10, 1995
Minister of Environment, Lands and Parks	Elizabeth Cull	May 10, 1995	August 16, 1995
Minister of Environment, Lands and Parks	Moe Sihota	August 16, 1995	February 22, 1996
Minister of Finance and Corporate Relations	Glen Clark	November 5, 1991	September 15, 1993
Minister of Finance and Corporate Relations	Elizabeth Cull	September 15, 1993	February 22, 1996
Minister of Forests	Dan Miller	November 5, 1991	September 17, 1992
Minister of Forests	Arthur Charbonneau	September 17, 1992	December 16, 1992
Minister of Forests	Dan Miller	December 16, 1992	September 15, 1993
Minister of Forests	Andrew Petter	September 15, 1993	February 22, 1996
Minister of Government Services	Lois Boone	November 5, 1991	September 15, 1993
Minister of Government Services	Robin Blencoe	September 15, 1993	March 9, 1995
Minister of Government Services	Arthur Charbonneau	March 9, 1995	April 10, 1995
Minister of Government Services	Ujjal Dosanjh	April 10, 1995	August 16, 1995
Minister of Government Services	Colin Gabelmann	August 16, 1995	February 22, 1996
Minister of Health	Elizabeth Cull	November 5, 1991	September 15, 1993
Minister of Health	Paul Ramsey	September 15, 1993	February 22, 1996
Minister of Housing, Recreation and Consumer Services	Joan Smallwood	September 15, 1993	October 26, 1995
Minister of Housing, Recreation and Consumer Services	Sue Hammell	October 26, 1995	February 22, 1996
Minister of Labour and Consumer Services	Moe Sihota	November 5, 1991	September 15, 1993
Minister responsible for Multiculturalism, Human Rights and Immigration (Note: "Multiculturalism and Human Rights" from November 5, 1991, to August 16, 1995)	Anita Hagen	November 5, 1991	September 15, 1993
Minister responsible for Multiculturalism, Human Rights and Immigration	Moe Sihota	September 15, 1993	May 10, 1995
Minister responsible for Multiculturalism, Human Rights and Immigration	Ujjal Dosanjh	May 10, 1995	February 22, 1996
Minister of Municipal Affairs, Recreation and Housing	Robin Blencoe	November 5, 1991	September 15, 1993
Minister of Municipal Affairs	Darlene Marzari	September 15, 1993	February 22, 1996
Minister responsible for Seniors	Elizabeth Cull	November 5, 1991	September 15, 1993
Minister responsible for Seniors	Paul Ramsey	September 15, 1993	February 22, 1996
Minister of Skills, Training and Labour	Dan Miller	September 15, 1993	February 22, 1996
Minister of Small Business, Tourism and Culture	Bill Barlee	September 15, 1993	February 22, 1996
Minister of Social Services	Joan Smallwood	November 5, 1991	September 15, 1993
Minister of Social Services	Joy MacPhail	September 15, 1993	February 22, 1996
Minister responsible for Sports (Note: "Sports and Commonwealth Games" from September 15, 1993, to April 10, 1995)	Robin Blencoe	September 15, 1993	March 9, 1995
Minister responsible for Sports	Arthur Charbonneau	March 9, 1995	April 10, 1995
Minister responsible for Sports	Ujjal Dosanjh	April 19, 1995	August 16, 1995
Minister responsible for Sports	Colin Gabelmann	August 16, 1995	February 22, 1996
Minister of Tourism	Darlene Marzari	November 5, 1991	September 15, 1993
Minister of Transportation and Highways	Arthur Charbonneau	November 5, 1991	September 15, 1993
Minister of Transportation and Highways	Jackie Pement	September 15, 1993	February 22, 1996
Minister of Women's Equality	Penny Priddy	November 5, 1991	February 22, 1996

== Cabinet composition and shuffles ==
Harcourt's initial cabinet consisted of 18 ministers. Several ministries saw their responsibilities adjusted: attorney general gained responsibility for Elections BC and the liquor distribution system, and took over all the duties of solicitor general (except for ICBC); crown lands and parks was merged into the environmental ministry; and responsibility for BC Ferries and BC Transit was moved from transportation to finance. Harcourt himself took the responsibility for the Trade Corporation.

A then-record of seven women were appointed to cabinet, in roles that Harcourt said "will be in charge of 80 per cent of the budget of B.C." A separate ministry of women's equality was also established, following a promise that the NDP had made in 1988. In reference to this, Denise Helm of the Times Colonist remarked that "B.C. women gained unprecedented political clout" in the Harcourt ministry. Additionally, Harcourt appointed the first Indo-Canadian cabinet minister in Canada, Moe Sihota.

On September 17, 1992, forests minister Dan Miller was "suspended" from cabinet for 90 days after he was found to have been in a conflict of interest regarding forestry licences. Art Charbonneau served as forests minister during Miller's suspension.

As part of an overall change in strategy, Harcourt initiated a major cabinet shuffle on September 15, 1993. Almost every portfolio changed hands, though Harcourt stressed that "these cabinet changes are more about me changing my attitude than the performance of individuals." Three members — Lois Boone, Anita Hagen and Tom Perry — were dropped from cabinet, and three backbenchers joined: Joy MacPhail, Jackie Pement and Paul Ramsey. The most notable change was Elizabeth Cull's promotion to deputy premier and finance minister, becoming the first woman finance minister in BC.

On March 9, 1995, Robin Blencoe resigned as government services minister, while under investigation for sexual harassment; however, Blencoe remained a member of the cabinet as minister without portfolio. Charbonneau was appointed to the ministry in the interim. After two more allegations emerged, Blencoe was removed from cabinet entirely, as well as party caucus, on April 4. Six days later, on April 10, caucus chairman Ujjal Dosanjh was named the new minister of government services, joining the cabinet.

On May 5, 1995, Sihota resigned from cabinet after being sanctioned by the BC Law Society; John Cashore stepped in as acting environment minister. A week later, Sihota's responsibilities were formally divided up among existing cabinet ministers: Cull took over as environment minister, Dosanjh took responsibility for multiculturalism and human rights, and Clark took responsibility for immigration policy. Regarding the division, Cull said she didn't "expect to carry two portfolios for an indefinite period of time." Three months later, on August 16, Sihota returned to cabinet as environment minister, though Dosanjh remained responsible for multiculturalism. Sihota's return was part of a small shuffle that also saw Colin Gabelmann and Dosanjh swap roles, with Gabelmann becoming minister of government services and Dosanjh becoming attorney general.

On October 26, 1995, Harcourt fired Joan Smallwood over her criticisms of his handling of the Bingogate scandal; she was succeeded as minister of consumer affairs by Sue Hammell.
