= Horgan ministry =

Cabinet of British Columbia, 2017–2022

- 36th ministry of British Columbia

- John Horgan in 2017
- Date formed: July 18, 2017
- Date dissolved: November 18, 2022 (Note: As cabinet ministers serve at His Majesty's pleasure and Eby did not immediately rescind their appointments upon his swearing in, the ministers appointed by Horgan remained in office until Eby named a new cabinet on December 7; this has led some sources, such as the Legislative Library of British Columbia, to list December 7 as the final date of service for members of Horgan's cabinet. However, Horgan's own time in the Executive Council ended on November 18.)

People and organizations
- Monarch: Elizabeth II (2017–2022); Charles III (2022)
- Lieutenant governor: Judith Guichon (2017–2018); Janet Austin (2018–2022)
- Premier: John Horgan
- Deputy premier: Carole James (2017–2020); vacant (2020–2021); Mike Farnworth (2021–2022)
- Member party: New Democratic
- Status in legislature: Minority (Note: Confidence & supply agreement with the Green Party of British Columbia.) (2017–2020); Majority (2020–2022)
- Opposition party: Liberal
- Opposition leader: Christy Clark (2017); Rich Coleman (2017–2018); Andrew Wilkinson (2018–2020); Shirley Bond (2020–2022); Kevin Falcon (2022)

History
- Incoming formation: 2017 government formation
- Outgoing formation: 2022 NDP leadership election
- Elections: 2017; 2020
- Legislature terms: 41st Parliament; 42nd Parliament
- Predecessor: Christy Clark ministry
- Successor: Eby ministry

The Horgan ministry was the combined Cabinet (formally the Executive Council of British Columbia) that governed British Columbia from July 18, 2017, to November 18, 2022. It was chaired by the 36th premier of British Columbia, John Horgan. The Cabinet was made up of members of the British Columbia New Democratic Party (NDP), which commanded a majority in the Legislative Assembly of British Columbia.

The ministry replaced the Christy Clark ministry following the aftermath of the 2017 general election. That election resulted in a hung parliament and the Clark ministry attempting to remain in office as a minority government; however, it was defeated by a motion of no confidence on June 29. As the NDP had made a confidence and supply deal with the British Columbia Green Party, enabling them to command a majority in the Legislature, Lieutenant Governor of British Columbia Judith Guichon invited Horgan to form government. The Horgan ministry was formally sworn in on July 18, 2017. The ministry governed through all but the first several weeks of the 41st Parliament of British Columbia and part of the 42nd Parliament of British Columbia, until Horgan announced his intention to retire. It was succeeded by the Eby ministry on November 18, 2022.

== List of ministers ==
Horgan ministry by portfolio
Portfolio	Minister	Tenure	
Portfolio	Minister	Start	End
Premier of British Columbia	John Horgan	July 18, 2017	November 18, 2022
Deputy Premier of British Columbia	Carole James	July 18, 2017	November 26, 2020
Deputy Premier of British Columbia	vacant	November 26, 2020	October 27, 2021
Deputy Premier of British Columbia	Mike Farnworth	October 28, 2021	November 18, 2022
Minister of Advanced Education and Skills Training (Note: "Advanced Education, Skills and Training" from July 18, 2017, to November 26, 2020)	Melanie Mark	July 18, 2017	November 26, 2020
Minister of Advanced Education and Skills Training	Anne Kang	November 26, 2020	November 18, 2022
Minister of Agriculture and Food (Note: "Agriculture" from July 18, 2017, to November 26, 2020; "Agriculture, Food and Fisheries" from November 26, 2020, to March 1, 2022)	Lana Popham	July 18, 2017	November 18, 2022
Attorney General	David Eby	July 18, 2017	July 19, 2022
Attorney General	Murray Rankin	July 22, 2022	November 18, 2022
Minister of Children and Family Development	Katrine Conroy	July 18, 2017	November 26, 2020
Minister of Children and Family Development	Mitzi Dean	November 26, 2020	November 18, 2022
Minister of State for Child Care	Katrina Chen	July 18, 2017	November 18, 2022
Minister of Citizens' Services	Jinny Sims	July 18, 2017	October 8, 2019
Minister of Citizens' Services	Selina Robinson	October 8, 2019	January 22, 2020
Minister of Citizens' Services	Anne Kang	January 22, 2020	November 26, 2020
Minister of Citizens' Services	Lisa Beare	November 26, 2020	November 18, 2022
Minister of Education and Child Care (Note: "Education" from July 18, 2017, to April 1, 2022)	Rob Fleming	July 18, 2017	November 26, 2020
Minister of Education and Child Care	Jennifer Whiteside	November 26, 2020	November 18, 2022
Minister of Energy, Mines and Low Carbon Innovation (and the Consular Corps) (Note: "Energy, Mines and Petroleum Resources" from July 18, 2017, to November 26, 2020)	Michelle Mungall	July 18, 2017	January 22, 2020
Minister of Energy, Mines and Low Carbon Innovation (and the Consular Corps)	Bruce Ralston	January 22, 2020	November 18, 2022
Minister of Environment and Climate Change Strategy (including TransLink)	George Heyman	July 18, 2017	November 18, 2022
Minister of Finance	Carole James	July 18, 2017	November 26, 2020
Minister of Finance	Selina Robinson	November 26, 2020	November 18, 2022
Minister responsible for Fisheries	Josie Osborne	April 1, 2022	November 18, 2022
Minister of Forests (Note: "Forests, Lands and Natural Resource Operations" from July 18, 2017, to April 1, 2022)	Doug Donaldson	July 18, 2017	November 26, 2020
Minister of Forests	Katrine Conroy	November 26, 2020	November 18, 2022
Minister responsible for Francophone Affairs	Adrian Dix	November 26, 2020	November 18, 2022
Minister of Health	Adrian Dix	July 18. 2017	November 18, 2022
Minister responsible for Housing	David Eby	November 26, 2020	July 19, 2022
Minister responsible for Housing	Murray Rankin	July 22, 2022	November 18, 2022
Minister of Indigenous Relations and Reconciliation	Scott Fraser	July 18, 2017	November 26, 2020
Minister of Indigenous Relations and Reconciliation	Murray Rankin	November 26, 2020	November 18, 2022
Minister of Jobs, Economic Recovery and Innovation (Note: "Jobs, Trade and Technology" from July 18, 2017, to January 22, 2020; "Jobs, Economic Development and Competitiveness from January 22, 2020, to November 26, 2020)	Bruce Ralston	July 18, 2017	January 22, 2020
Minister of Jobs, Economic Recovery and Innovation	Michelle Mungall	January 22, 2020	November 26, 2020
Minister of Jobs, Economic Recovery and Innovation	Ravi Kahlon	November 26, 2020	November 18, 2022
Minister of State for Trade	George Chow	July 18, 2017	November 18, 2022
Minister of Labour	Harry Bains	July 18, 2017	November 18, 2022
Minister of Land, Water and Resource Stewardship	Josie Osborne	February 25, 2022	November 18, 2022
Minister of State for Lands and Natural Resource Operations	Nathan Cullen	November 26, 2020	February 25, 2022
Minister of Mental Health and Addictions	Judy Darcy	July 18, 2017	November 26, 2020
Minister of Mental Health and Addictions	Sheila Malcolmson	November 26, 2020	November 18, 2022
Minister of Municipal Affairs and Housing	Selina Robinson	July 18, 2017	November 26, 2020
Minister of Municipal Affairs	Josie Osborne	November 26, 2020	February 25, 2022
Minister of Municipal Affairs	Nathan Cullen	February 25, 2022	November 18, 2022
Minister of Public Safety and Solicitor General	Mike Farnworth	July 18, 2017	November 18, 2022
Minister of Social Development and Poverty Reduction	Shane Simpson	July 18, 2017	November 26, 2020
Minister of Social Development and Poverty Reduction	Nicholas Simons	November 26, 2020	November 18, 2022
Minister of Tourism, Arts, Culture and Sport (Note: "Tourism, Arts, Culture" from July 18, 2017, to November 26, 2020)	Lisa Beare	July 18, 2017	November 26, 2020
Minister of Tourism, Arts, Culture and Sport	Melanie Mark	November 26, 2020	September 28, 2022
Minister of Tourism, Arts, Culture and Sport	Lisa Beare	September 28, 2022	November 18, 2022
Minister of Transportation and Infrastructure	Claire Trevena	July 18, 2017	November 26, 2020
Minister of Transportation and Infrastructure	Rob Fleming	November 26, 2020	November 18, 2022
Minister of State for Infrastructure	Bowinn Ma	November 26, 2020	November 18, 2022

Horgan ministry by minister
Portfolio	Minister	Tenure	
Portfolio	Minister	Start	End
John Horgan	Premier of British Columbia	July 18, 2017	November 18, 2022
Harry Bains	Minister of Labour	July 18, 2017	November 18, 2022
Lisa Beare	Minister of Tourism, Arts, Culture	July 18, 2017	November 26, 2020
Lisa Beare	Minister of Citizens' Services	November 26, 2020	November 18, 2022
Lisa Beare	Minister of Tourism, Arts, Culture and Sport	September 28, 2022	November 18, 2022
Katrina Chen	Minister of State for Child Care	July 18, 2017	November 18, 2022
George Chow	Minister of State for Trade	July 18, 2017	November 18, 2022
Katrine Conroy	Minister of Children and Family Development	July 18, 2017	November 26, 2020
Katrine Conroy	Minister of Forests, Lands and Natural Resource Operations	November 26, 2020	April 1, 2022
Katrine Conroy	Minister of Forests	April 1, 2022	November 18, 2022
Nathan Cullen	Minister of State for Lands and Natural Resource Operations	November 26, 2020	February 25, 2022
Nathan Cullen	Minister of Municipal Affairs	February 25, 2022	November 18, 2022
Judy Darcy	Minister of Mental Health and Addictions	July 18, 2017	November 26, 2020
Mitzi Dean	Minister of Children and Family Development	November 26, 2020	November 18, 2022
Adrian Dix	Minister of Health	July 18, 2017	November 18, 2022
Adrian Dix	Minister responsible for Francophone Affairs	November 26, 2020	November 18, 2022
Doug Donaldson	Minister of Forests, Lands and Natural Resource Operations	July 18, 2017	November 26, 2020
David Eby	Minister of Justice and Attorney General	July 18, 2017	July 19, 2022
David Eby	Minister responsible for Housing	November 26, 2020	July 19, 2022
Mike Farnworth	Minister of Public Safety and Solicitor General	July 18, 2017	November 18, 2022
Mike Farnworth	Deputy Premier of British Columbia	October 28, 2021	November 18, 2022
Rob Fleming	Minister of Education	July 18, 2017	November 26, 2020
Rob Fleming	Minister of Transportation and Infrastructure	November 26, 2020	November 18, 2022
Scott Fraser	Minister of Indigenous Relations and Reconciliation	July 18, 2017	November 26, 2020
George Heyman	Minister of Environment and Climate Change Strategy (including TransLink)	July 18, 2017	November 18, 2022
Carole James	Deputy Premier of British Columbia	July 18, 2017	November 26, 2020
Carole James	Minister of Finance	July 18, 2017	November 26, 2020
Ravi Kahlon	Minister of Jobs, Economic Recovery and Innovation	November 26, 2020	November 18, 2022
Anne Kang	Minister of Citizens' Services	January 22, 2020	November 26, 2020
Anne Kang	Minister of Advanced Education and Skills Training	November 26, 2020	November 18, 2022
Bowinn Ma	Minister of State for Infrastructure	November 26, 2020	November 18, 2022
Sheila Malcolmson	Minister of Mental Health and Addictions	November 26, 2020	November 18, 2022
Melanie Mark	Minister of Advanced Education, Skills and Training	July 18, 2017	November 26, 2020
Melanie Mark	Minister of Tourism, Arts, Culture and Sport	November 26, 2020	September 28, 2022
Michelle Mungall	Minister of Energy, Mines and Petroleum Resources	July 18, 2017	January 22, 2020
Michelle Mungall	Minister of Jobs, Economic Development and Competitiveness	January 22, 2020	November 26, 2020
Josie Osborne	Minister of Municipal Affairs	November 26, 2020	February 25, 2022
Josie Osborne	Minister of Land, Water and Resource Stewardship	February 25, 2022	November 18, 2022
Josie Osborne	Minister responsible for Fisheries	April 1, 2022	November 18, 2022
Lana Popham	Minister of Agriculture	July 18, 2017	November 26, 2020
Lana Popham	Minister of Agriculture, Food and Fisheries	November 26, 2020	April 1, 2022
Lana Popham	Minister of Agriculture and Food	April 1, 2022	November 18, 2022
Bruce Ralston	Minister of Jobs, Trade and Technology	July 18, 2017	January 22, 2020
Bruce Ralston	Minister of Energy, Mines and Petroleum Resources	January 22, 2020	November 26, 2020
Bruce Ralston	Minister of Energy, Mines and Low Carbon Innovation (and the Consular Corps)	November 26, 2020	November 18, 2022
Murray Rankin	Minister of Indigenous Relations and Reconciliation	November 26, 2020	November 18, 2022
Murray Rankin	Minister of Justice and Attorney General	July 22, 2022	November 18, 2022
Murray Rankin	Minister responsible for Housing	July 22, 2022	November 18, 2022
Selina Robinson	Minister of Municipal Affairs and Housing	July 18, 2017	November 26, 2020
Selina Robinson	Minister of Citizens' Services	October 8, 2019	January 22, 2020
Selina Robinson	Minister of Finance	November 26, 2020	November 18, 2022
Nicholas Simons	Minister of Social Development and Poverty Reduction	November 26, 2020	November 18, 2022
Shane Simpson	Minister of Social Development and Poverty Reduction	July 18, 2017	November 26, 2020
Jinny Sims	Minister of Citizens' Services	July 18, 2017	October 8, 2019
Claire Trevena	Minister of Transportation and Infrastructure	July 18, 2017	November 26, 2020
Jennifer Whiteside	Minister of Education	November 26, 2020	April 1, 2022
Jennifer Whiteside	Minister of Education and Child Care	April 1, 2022	November 18, 2022

== Cabinet shuffles ==
On October 4, 2019, Jinny Sims resigned as minister of Citizens' Services due to an on-going RCMP investigation; Selina Robinson temporarily assumed her portfolio. On January 22, 2020, Horgan appointed Anne Kang to fill the vacancy and had Michelle Mungall (then minister of Energy and Mines) and Bruce Ralston (then minister of Jobs, Economic Recovery and Innovation) swap portfolios.

Following the 2020 election, Horgan initiated a major cabinet shuffle on November 26, 2020. The cabinet expanded from 23 to 25 ministers, including Horgan. On February 25, 2022, Josie Osborne was appointed the first minister of Land, Water and Resource Stewardship; Nathan Cullen took on her prior role as minister of Municipal Affairs.

In 2022, columnist Keith Baldry noted that the Horgan ministry stood apart from its predecessors due to its "no-shuffle approach". Where it was previously unusual for a minister to stay in one portfolio for more than two or three years, the Horgan ministry had eight ministers who had held their posts for the entirety of the ministry to that point: Harry Bains (labour), Katrine Chen (child care), George Chow (trade), Adrian Dix (health), David Eby (attorney general), Mike Farnworth (solicitor general), George Heyman (environment) and Lana Popham (agriculture). Bains, Eby, Farnworth, Heyman and Popham each became the longest-serving minister of their portfolios in several decades.

On July 19, 2022, Eby stepped down from cabinet in order to stand in the 2022 British Columbia New Democratic Party leadership election; Murray Rankin stepped in as attorney general and housing minister, initially on an interim basis before being appointed to the role on an ongoing basis on August 2. On September 28, 2022, Melanie Mark resigned from cabinet to go on medical leave; Lisa Beare assumed responsibility for tourism.
