= Gordon McGregor Sloan =

Canadian politician and Chief Justice of British Columbia (1898–1959)

Gordon McGregor Sloan (May 16, 1898 – January 14, 1959) was a lawyer, judge and political figure in British Columbia. He represented Vancouver Centre in the Legislative Assembly of British Columbia from 1933 to 1937 as a Liberal.

He was born in Nanaimo, British Columbia, the son of William Sloan and Flora Glaholm, and was educated at University School in Victoria and at Langara School in Vancouver. Sloan served as a pilot and instructor in the Royal Flying Corps and Royal Air Force. In 1918, he married Nancy Porter Nicol, a native of Scotland.

After the war, Sloan articled in Victoria, was called to the British Columbia bar in 1921 and practised in Vancouver from 1921 to 1933. He served in the provincial cabinet as Attorney-General. In April 1937, Sloan resigned his seat and was named to the British Columbia Court of Appeal. He served on a number of commissions: the Federal Royal Commission into Salmon fishing in 1940, the Workmens Compensation Board Inquiry in 1942, the Royal Commission on Forest Resources from 1943 to 1945, the Workmens Compensation Board Inquiry in 1952 and the Royal Commission on Forest Resources from 1955 to 1957. In 1944, he was named Chief Justice for the Court of Appeal. Sloan also served as mediator in a number of provincial and national labour disputes. In December 1957, he resigned from the Court of Appeal; at the same time, he was named forestry adviser to the provincial government.

Sloan suffered a heart attack in November 1958 and died from complications the following January at the age of 60.
