= Theodore Davie ministry =

Cabinet of British Columbia, 1892–1895

- 10th ministry of British Columbia
- Date formed: July 2, 1892
- Date dissolved: March 2, 1895

People and organisations
- Monarch: Victoria
- Lieutenant Governor: Hugh Nelson (1887–1892); Edgar Dewdney (1892–1897)
- Premier: Theodore Davie
- No. of ministers: 5
- Ministers removed: 1
- Total no. of members: 6
- Member parties: Non-partisan

History
- Election: 1894
- Legislature terms: 6th Parliament; 7th Parliament
- Predecessor: Robson ministry
- Successor: John H. Turner ministry

The Theodore Davie ministry was the combined Cabinet that governed British Columbia from July 2, 1892, to March 2, 1895. It was led by Theodore Davie, the tenth premier of British Columbia. Davie became premier after the death of incumbent premier John Robson, following an accident during a diplomatic visit to London, England. The cabinet governed the province until Davie's resignation in 1895.

== List of ministers ==
Theodore Davie ministry by portfolio
Portfolio	Minister	Tenure	
Portfolio	Minister	Start	End
Premier of British Columbia	Theodore Davie	July 2, 1892	March 2, 1895
President of the Council	Charles Edward Pooley	July 2, 1892	March 2, 1895
Attorney General	Theodore Davie	July 2, 1892	March 2, 1895
Minister of Finance and Agriculture	John Herbert Turner	July 2, 1892	March 2, 1895
Minister of Education and Immigration	James Baker	July 2, 1892	March 2, 1895
Chief Commissioner of Lands and Works	Forbes George Vernon	July 2, 1892	October 5, 1894 (Note: Lost their seat in the 1894 general election.)
Chief Commissioner of Lands and Works	George Bohun Martin	October 5, 1894	March 2, 1895
Minister of Mines	Theodore Davie	July 2, 1892	September 6, 1892
Minister of Mines	James Baker	September 6, 1892	March 2, 1895
Provincial Secretary	Theodore Davie	July 2, 1892	September 6, 1892
Provincial Secretary	James Baker	September 6, 1892	March 2, 1895
