= A. E. B. Davie ministry =

Cabinet of British Columbia, 1887–1889

- 8th ministry of British Columbia
- Date formed: April 1, 1887
- Date dissolved: August 1, 1889

People and organisations
- Monarch: Victoria
- Lieutenant Governor: Hugh Nelson
- Premier: Alexander Edmund Batson Davie
- Member parties: Non-partisan

History
- Election: None
- Legislature term: 5th Parliament of British Columbia
- Predecessor: Smithe ministry
- Successor: Robson ministry

The A. E. B. Davie ministry was the combined Cabinet that governed British Columbia from April 1, 1887, to August 1, 1889. It was led by Alexander Edmund Batson Davie, the eighth premier of British Columbia.

== List of ministers ==
A. E. B. Davie ministry by portfolio
Portfolio	Minister	Tenure	
Portfolio	Minister	Start	End
Premier of British Columbia	Alexander Edmund Batson Davie	April 1, 1887	August 1, 1889 (Note: Died in office.)
Acting Premier of British Columbia	John Robson	January 27, 1888	April 28, 1888
President of the Council	Alexander Edmund Batson Davie	April 5, 1887	August 8, 1887
President of the Council	Robert Dunsmuir	August 8, 1887	April 12, 1889
President of the Council	vacant	April 13, 1889	April 16, 1889
President of the Council	John Robson	April 17, 1889	August 1, 1889
Attorney General	Alexander Edmund Batson Davie	April 1, 1887	August 1, 1889
Minister of Finance and Agriculture	John Robson	April 1, 1887	August 8, 1887
Minister of Finance and Agriculture	John Herbert Turner	August 8, 1887	August 1, 1889
Chief Commissioner of Lands and Works	Forbes George Vernon	April 1, 1887	August 1, 1889
Minister of Mines	John Robson	April 1, 1887	August 1, 1889
Provincial Secretary	John Robson	April 1, 1887	August 1, 1889
Member without portfolio	Theodore Davie	January 7, 1888	June 18, 1888
