= Robert Randolph Bruce =

Canadian diplomat

The Honourable Robert Randolph Bruce
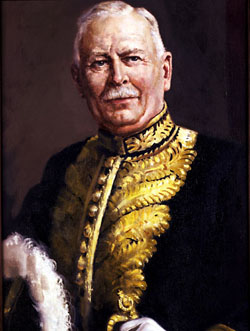
- Robert Randolph Bruce

13th Lieutenant Governor of British Columbia
- In office January 21, 1926 – July 18, 1931
- Monarch: George V
- Governors General: The Viscount Byng of Vimy; The Viscount Willingdon; The Earl of Bessborough
- Premier: John Oliver; John Duncan MacLean; Simon Fraser Tolmie
- Preceded by: Walter Cameron Nichol
- Succeeded by: John William Fordham Johnson

Personal details
- Born: July 16, 1863 Lhanbryde, Scotland
- Died: February 21, 1942 (aged 78) Montreal, Quebec, Canada
- Party: Liberal
- Education: University of Glasgow
- Occupation: engineer, mining proprietor
- Profession: Politician, Diplomat

Robert Randolph Bruce (July 16, 1863 – February 21, 1942) was an engineer, mining proprietor and the 13th Lieutenant Governor of British Columbia from 1926 to 1931.

== Early life ==
Bruce was born in Scotland and educated at the University of Glasgow where he studied engineering. He emigrated to the United States in 1887 before arriving in Canada to work for the Canadian Pacific Railway. In 1897 he settled in British Columbia to become a prospector. Bruce and his partner established a lead and silver mine near Windermere Lake in the East Kootenay region of British Columbia. He purchased land from the railway and promoted it in England for settlement.

== Career ==
Bruce became the province's lieutenant-governor in 1926. Unusually for former viceroys, he attempted to enter politics following his tenure as the Queen's representative and stood for the Liberal Party of Canada in the 1935 federal election but was narrowly defeated by Henry Herbert Stevens in the riding of Kootenay East. The government of William Lyon Mackenzie King appointed Bruce as Canada's second envoy to Japan with the title of Minister Plenipotentiary in 1936. He served for two years before retiring to Montreal.

== Notes ==
- Foreign Affairs and International Trade Canada Complete List of Posts

== Sources ==
- Official biography, British Columbia Lieutenant-Governor's Office
