= Simon Fraser Tolmie =

Canadian politician

The Honourable Simon Fraser Tolmie PC
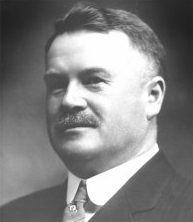
- The Hon. Simon Fraser Tolmie

21st Premier of British Columbia
- In office 21 August 1928 – 15 November 1933
- Monarch: George V
- Lieutenant Governor: Robert Randolph Bruce; John W. F. Johnson
- Preceded by: John Duncan MacLean
- Succeeded by: Thomas Dufferin Pattullo

MLA for Saanich
- In office 18 July 1928 – 2 November 1933
- Preceded by: Thomas George Coventry
- Succeeded by: Norman William Whittaker

Member of the Canadian Parliament for Victoria City
- In office 17 December 1917 – 29 October 1925
- Preceded by: George Henry Barnard
- Succeeded by: District Abolished

Member of the Canadian Parliament for Victoria
- In office 29 October 1925 – 5 June 1928
- Preceded by: New District
- Succeeded by: D'Arcy Plunkett
- In office 8 June 1936 – 13 October 1937
- Preceded by: D'Arcy Plunkett
- Succeeded by: Robert Mayhew

Personal details
- Born: 25 January 1867 Victoria, British Columbia
- Died: 13 October 1937 (aged 70) Victoria, British Columbia
- Party: Conservative
- Other political affiliations: BC Conservative
- Spouse: Mary Anne Tolmie
- Children: 4
- Parent: William Fraser Tolmie (father)
- Cabinet: Minister of Agriculture (1919–1921, 1926)

Simon Fraser Tolmie, PC (25 January 1867 – 13 October 1937) was a veterinarian, farmer, politician, and the 21st premier of British Columbia, Canada.

== Early life ==
Tolmie had a pioneer/Indigenous lineage, which aided him in his political aspirations. He was the son of Dr. William Fraser Tolmie, a prominent figure in the Hudson's Bay Company and a member of both the colonial assembly of Colony of Vancouver Island and the Legislative Assembly of British Columbia. William Fraser was early supporter of Scottish industrialist reformer Robert Owen, and was a strong supporter of women's suffrage in British Columbia. His mixed Indigenous-settler maternal ancestry was representative of the marriages of First Nations women and men who worked in the fur trade. Tolmie's mother, Jane Work, was the daughter of John Work, a prominent Victoria resident, Hudson's Bay Company Chief Factor, and member of the former colony's assembly. Jane's mother was Josette Legace, a daughter of a First Nations woman from the Spokane area and Pierre Legace, a French-Canadian trapper father. Born in Victoria, Tolmie spent his early life on his family's vast farm, Cloverdale (the Victoria neighbourhood bears its name). He graduated from the Ontario Veterinary College in 1891 and later became the Dominion Inspector of Livestock.

== Early political career ==
Tolmie entered federal politics in the election of 1917, becoming Unionist MP for Victoria City. He was returned in the subsequent four elections as a Conservative (the riding changed its name to Victoria in 1924). Tolmie served as Minister of Agriculture in the governments of Sir Robert Borden and Arthur Meighen from 1919–1921, and in 1926.

Tolmie was part of a general anti-drug panic in 1922 with severe racist overtones. He supported amendments to drug laws calling for the deportation of all Asians convicted of trafficking and for the use of the 'lash'.

== Premier of British Columbia ==
Tolmie was elected leader of the British Columbia Conservative Party in 1926 but continued to sit as a Member of Parliament until the 1928 provincial election, in which he ran and was elected MLA for Saanich. The Conservatives were victorious that year, taking 32 of the legislature's 48 seats, including every seat in Vancouver and Victoria. Tolmie thus became Premier of the province, also serving as Minister of Railways. Between 1 June and 15 November 1933, he further served as the province's Minister of Agriculture and President of the Council.

Like their federal counterparts, who returned to power in 1930, Tolmie's Tories' commitment to applying "business principles to the business of government," rebounded to their disadvantage when the Great Depression hit. By 1931, unemployment reached 28% - the highest in Canada - and Tolmie was finally forced to act, setting up remote relief camps. Tolmie acceded to the request from the business community that a royal commission be established to propose solutions to the province's increasingly dire financial situation. The Kidd Report, issued in 1932, recommended such sharp cuts to social services that mainstream British Columbians were enraged. They had come to expect more from their provincial government than its traditional functions of maintaining law and order, providing physical infrastructure and encouraging private enterprise.

The strained situation took its toll on the provincial party, which became so wracked by internal discord that the executive decided to run no candidates in the 1933 election. Rather, each local riding association acted on its own. Some candidates ran as independents, some as Independent Conservatives. Those supporting Tolmie, ran as the Unionist Party of British Columbia, and those grouped around William John Bowser, a former premier, ran as Non-Partisans. The result was easily foreseen. The Liberals captured 42% of the vote and 34 of the 47 seats, the new social democratic Co-operative Commonwealth Federation became the official opposition, and the Conservatives who had run under various banners picked up just five seats. Tolmie lost his own seat. He is the most recent Conservative to serve as BC premier, until Lorne Doerkson (who won the 2026 election) takes office.

== Later life ==
Tolmie returned to politics three years later, returning to his old federal seat of Victoria in a 1936 by-election. He died in Victoria a little over a year later.
