= William Sloan (politician) =

Canadian politician

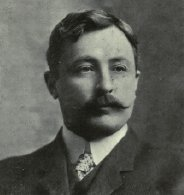

Member of the Canadian Parliament for Comox—Atlin
- In office 1904–1909
- Preceded by: District was created in 1903
- Succeeded by: William Templeman

Member of the Legislative Assembly of British Columbia for Nanaimo
- In office 1916–1928

Personal details
- Born: September 10, 1867 Wingham, Ontario
- Died: March 2, 1928 (aged 60)
- Party: Liberal
- Cabinet: Provincial: Minister of Mines (1916-1928); Commissioner of Fisheries (1918-1924); Provincial Secretary (1924-1927); Clerk of the Executive Council (1924-1928)

William Sloan (September 10, 1867 – March 2, 1928) was a Canadian businessman and Liberal politician. He was Member of Parliament for Comox-Atlin from 1904 until 1909, when he resigned to provide a seat for William Templeman.

Born in Wingham, Ontario, Sloan continued to be active in provincial politics, serving as MLA for Nanaimo from 1916 until his death in 1928. A minister in the Liberal cabinets of the time, Sloan held the posts of Minister of Mines, Commissioner of Fisheries, Clerk of the Executive Council, and Provincial Secretary.

His son Gordon became a member of the provincial assembly and served in the province's cabinet and in the B.C. Court of Appeal.
