= John Duncan MacLean =

Canadian politician

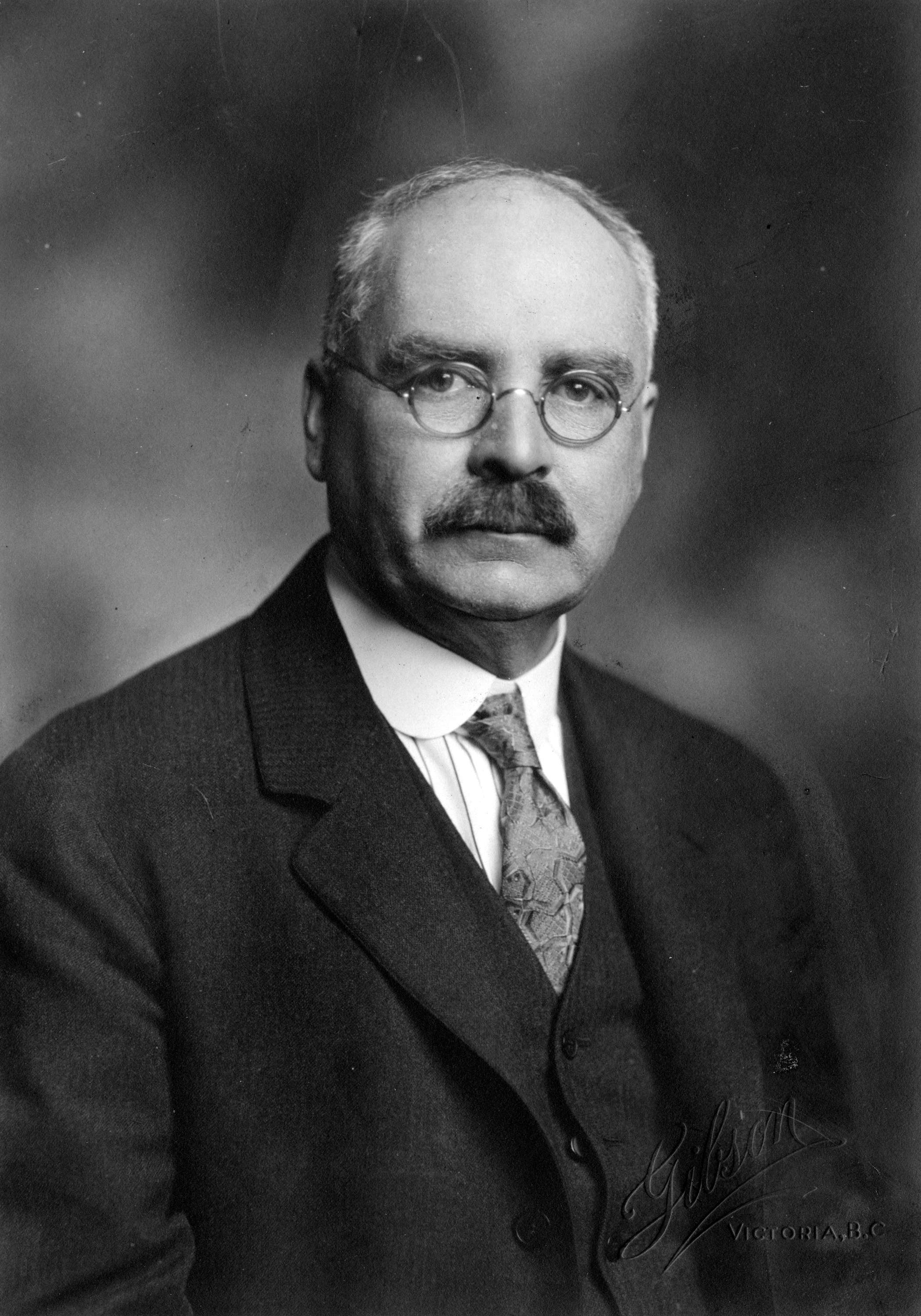
- MacLean in 1928

20th Premier of British Columbia
- In office August 20, 1927 – August 20, 1928
- Monarch: George V
- Lieutenant Governor: Robert Randolph Bruce
- Preceded by: John Oliver
- Succeeded by: Simon Fraser Tolmie

MLA for Greenwood
- In office September 14, 1916 – June 20, 1924
- Preceded by: John Robert Jackson
- Succeeded by: Riding dissolved

MLA for Yale
- In office June 20, 1924 – July 18, 1928
- Preceded by: John McRae
- Succeeded by: John Joseph Alban Gillis

Personal details
- Born: December 8, 1873 Culloden, Prince Edward Island
- Died: March 28, 1948 (aged 74) Ottawa, Ontario, Canada
- Party: Liberal
- Spouse: Mary Gertrude Watson
- Children: 6
- Occupation: Teacher, physician

John Duncan MacLean (December 8, 1873 – March 28, 1948) was a teacher, physician, politician and the 20th premier of British Columbia, Canada.

MacLean was a practicing physician in Greenwood when he was elected to the provincial legislature for the Liberal in the 1916 election. He served as minister of education and provincial secretary in the cabinets of Harlan Carey Brewster and John Oliver before becoming minister of finance in 1924. In the election that year, he was elected in the riding of Yale riding. He also served as Minister of Industries between 1924 and 1928.

MacLean became premier following Oliver's death in 1927, at a time when the Liberal government was in decline. He was unable to reverse his party's decline and was defeated in the 1928 election by the Conservatives. Later that year, he contested a by-election for a seat in the House of Commons of Canada as a Liberal candidate but was defeated by fewer than one hundred votes. He spent the rest of his life as chairman of the Canadian Farm Loan Board.

== Election results (partial) ==
1920 British Columbia general election: Greenwood
Party	Candidate	Votes	%
Liberal	John Duncan MacLean	392	49.06
Conservative	George Bell	292	36.55
Independent Farmer	George Henry Pitman	115	14.39
Total valid votes		799	100.00

1924 British Columbia general election: Yale riding
Party	Candidate	Votes	%
Liberal	John Duncan MacLean	1,148	46.09
Conservative	John McRae	765	30.71
Provincial	James Sugrue Fagan	578	23.20
Total valid votes		2,491	100.00
