= Executive Council of British Columbia =

Overview of the executive council of the Canadian province of British Columbia

- Arms of His Majesty the King in right of British Columbia
- Nickname: Cabinet of British Columbia
- Formation: July 20, 1871 (155 years ago)
- Members: Lieutenant governor of British Columbia; Premier of British Columbia; 23 ministers of the Crown
- Monarch of Canada: Charles III
- Represented by: Wendy Cocchia, Lieutenant Governor
- Chair: Lorne Doerkson, Premier
- Staff: Government of British Columbia
- Website: www2.gov.bc.ca/gov/content/governments/organizational-structure/cabinet/cabinet-ministers

The Executive Council of British Columbia (the Cabinet) is the cabinet of the Canadian province of British Columbia. Almost always composed of members of the Legislative Assembly of British Columbia, the Cabinet is similar in structure and role as the federal Cabinet of Canada is to the Canadian House of Commons.

Executive power is vested in the Crown: the lieutenant governor of British Columbia, as representative of the Crown, exercises executive power on the advice of the Cabinet as the lieutenant governor in Council. Members of the Cabinet are selected by the premier of British Columbia, who chairs the Cabinet.

== History ==
Prior to their union in 1866, the Executive Councils of the separate crown colonies of British Columbia and Vancouver Island were largely appointed by the governor and included military and judicial officials, their role that of the governor's cabinet, similar to the present except that the governor took part in cabinet meetings and political decisions, whereas the modern-day lieutenant governor does not. The colonial Legislative Assemblies were subordinate to the governor and the Council and served more as a sounding-board than a legislative body.

== Cabinet ==
The current Cabinet consists of members of the Legislative Assembly representing the province's governing party, the British Columbia New Democratic Party. Lorne Doerkson was sworn in as Premier of British Columbia by Lieutenant Governor Wendy Cocchia on November 20, 2026. His cabinet was sworn in at the same ceremony.

Lieutenant governor		Viceregent since
Wendy Lisogar-Cocchia		2025
Portfolio	Minister	Minister since
Premier of British Columbia	Lorne Doerkson	2026
Minister of Agriculture	Ian Paton	2026
Attorney General of British Columbia	Caroline Elliott	2026
Minister of Children and Family Development	Kristina Loewen	2026
Minister of Citizens Services and Technology	Bruce Banman	2026
Minister of Economic Development and Tourism	Gavin Dew	2026
Minister of Education and Child Care	Lynne Block	2026
Minister of Energy, Mines, and Petroleum Resources	Larry Neufeld	2026
Minister of Environment	Áʼa꞉líya Warbus	2026
Minister of Finance	Peter Milobar	2026
Minister of Forests	Kiel Giddens	2026
Minister of Health	Ryan Peterson	2026
Minister of Indigenous Relations and Reconciliation	Scott McInnis	2026
Minister of Local Government, Housing, Sport, and Culture	Cathie Ounsted	2026
Minister of Post-Secondary Education and Labour	Korky Neufeld	2026
Minister of Public Safety and Solicitor General	Jessy Sahota	2026
Minister of Social Development and Deputy Premier	Claire Rattée	2026
Minister of Transportation and Infrastructure	Trevor Halford	2026
Minister of Water, Land, and Natural Resource Operations	Donegal Wilson	2026
Minister of State for Emergency Management	Ward Stamer	2026
Minister of State for Housing	Zeeshan Wahla	2026
Minister of State for Labour	Harman Bhangu	2026
Minister of State for Mining	Pete Davis	2026
Minister of State for Red Tape Reduction	Carson Binda	2026
Minister of State for Rural Development	Anna Kindy	2026
