= Results of the 2001 British Columbia general election by riding =

The 2001 British Columbia general election was the 37th provincial election in the province of British Columbia, Canada, held on May 16, 2001. The results of the election are provided below by individual electoral district, indicating the political party, candidate name, and number of votes received.

== Riding results ==
Names in bold with a double dagger (‡) indicate party leaders, cabinet ministers and former premiers. Incumbents denoted with a dagger (†) did not seek re-election.

=== Northern British Columbia ===
Electoral district	Candidates						Incumbent
Electoral district	NDP	Liberal	Green	Marijuana	Unity	Other	Incumbent
Bulkley Valley-Stikine	Bill Goodacre; 2,823	Dennis MacKay; 7,414	Rolf Hussinger; 856	Trevor McKilligan; 507	Rod Taylor; 1,190	Theresa Tait (ANP); 405; Bill Forsyth (BC); 62	Bill Goodacre
North Coast	Colleen Fitzpatrick; 4,084	Bill Belsey; 4,915	David Konsmo; 560	Kenneth Peerless; 623	Clarence Hall; 152	Emily Bolton (ANP); 526	**Dan Miller** † ‡
Peace River North	Brian Churchill; 1,047	Richard Neufeld; 6,629		Paul Renaud; 810	Roy Daniel Strange; 568		Richard Neufeld
Peace River South	Elmer Kabush; 767	Blair Lekstrom; 6,393	Stacy LaJeunesse; 407	Michelle Rainey-Fenkarek; 444	Garret Golhof; 225	Grant Mitton (SC); 1,726	Jack Weisgerber †
Prince George-Mount Robson	Todd Whitcombe; 2,655	Shirley Bond; 8,033	Lelani Arris; 1,429	Andrej DeWolf; 744	Bob Zayonc; 1,110	Erle Martz (Ref.); 445	Lois Boone †
Prince George North	Bryan Llewellyn; 2,148	Pat Bell; 9,215	Hilary Crowley; 1,137	Robert Grimsrud; 588	David G. Low; 838	Lisa Maskell (WR); 621; Fred McLeod (Ind.); 478; Leif Jensen (Ind.); 76	**Paul Ramsey** † ‡
Prince George-Omineca	Ed John; 3,156	Paul Nettleton; 10,469	David Usher; 1,026	Will DeWolf; 646	Eldon Matte; 1,168		Paul Nettleton
Skeena	Helmut Giesbrecht; 2,644	Roger Harris; 8,653	Roger Benham; 695	Bob Erb; 810		Gerald Amos (ANP); 479	Helmut Giesbrecht

=== Kootenay, Columbia and Boundary ===
Electoral district	Candidates					Incumbent
Electoral district	NDP	Liberal	Green	Marijuana	Unity	Incumbent
Columbia River-Revelstoke	**Jim Doyle** ‡ 4,465	Wendy McMahon; 7,659	Jennifer Brownlee; 946	Lisa Kirkman; 616	Miles Lehn; 484	**Jim Doyle** ‡
East Kootenay	Erda Walsh; 3,502	Bill Bennett; 9,771	Joni Krats; 1,229	Fred Sima; 670	Bruce Parke; 621	Erda Walsh
Nelson-Creston	**Corky Evans** ‡ 6,626	Blair Suffredine; 8,161	Colleen McCrory; 4,354	Dan Loehndorf; 540	Stephen Cox; 1,064	**Corky Evans** ‡
West Kootenay-Boundary	Ed Conroy; 6,376	Sandy Santori; 9,718	Patricia Pepe; 1,796	**Brian Taylor** ‡ 785	Mark McLaren; 1,065	Ed Conroy

=== Okanagan and Shuswap ===
Electoral district	Candidates						Incumbent
Electoral district	NDP	Liberal	Green	Marijuana	Unity	Other	Incumbent
Kelowna-Lake Country	Janet Scotland; 3,102	John Weisbeck; 14,093	Devra Rice; 2,606	Paul Halonen; 734	Kevin Wendland; 1,496	David Thomson (Act); 272	John Weisbeck
Kelowna-Mission	Assunta Rossal; 3,066	Sindi Hawkins; 15,351	Angela Reid; 2,588	Kelly Nichol; 787	Paul Vogan; 1,674	Grant Baudais (Act); 296	Sindi Hawkins
Okanagan-Vernon	Troy Sebastien; 3,529	Tom Christensen; 13,868	Erin Nelson; 2,214	Michael Jones; 917	Doug MacDonald; 3,213	Herb Wong (Ind.); 562; Kathleen Daniels (Ind.); 157; Andrew Hokold (Pat); 82	April Sanders †
Okanagan-Westside	Ernie Ursuliak; 3,176	Rick Thorpe; 14,181		Teresa Taylor; 1,188	Howard Lionel Hunt; 1,364	Jack Peach (Act); 921	Rick Thorpe
Penticton-Okanagan Valley	Naga Terada; 3,887	Bill Barisoff; 15,609	Harry Naegal; 3,524	Riley Goldstone; 786	Walter Ozero; 553	Kal Gidda (BC); 522	Bill Barisoff
Shuswap	Wayne Fowler; 3,788	George Abbott; 12,950	Larissa Lutjen; 2,423	Paddy Roberts; 835	Al Thiessen; 2,857	Jeanette McLennan (Ind.); 119; Scott Yee (Cen); 41	George Abbott

=== Thompson and Cariboo ===
Electoral district	Candidates						Incumbent
Electoral district	NDP	Liberal	Green	Marijuana	Unity	Other	Incumbent
Cariboo North	Frank Garden; 2,732	John Wilson; 10,044	Douglas Gook; 712	Stephen Payne; 509	Steven McBeth; 420	Kim McIvor (Ind.); 727 Al Charlebois (PF); 24	John Wilson
Cariboo South	David Zirnhelt; 4,259	Walt Cobb; 10,259		Mike Orr; 739	Christopher Matte; 598	Dan Case (AN); 552 Bruce Broomfield (PF); 83	David Zirnhelt
Kamloops	**Cathy McGregor** ‡ 4,592	Claude Richmond; 12,258	Joe Teichman; 2,180	Julian Gushulak; 707	Ruth Watson; 430	Ernie Schmidt (Ind.); 193	**Cathy McGregor** ‡
Kamloops-North Thompson	Dwayne Hartle; 4,181	Kevin Krueger; 12,676	Denis Walsh; 3,122	Vern Falk; 1025	Bob Altenhofen; 836		Kevin Krueger
Yale-Lillooet	Victor York; 2,817	David Chutter; 9,845	Harue Kanemitsu; 1,657	Vincent Royer; 807		Don Moses (AN); 1126; Dorothy-Jean O'Donnell (PF); 136	**Harry Lali** † ‡

=== Fraser Valley ===
Electoral district	Candidates						Incumbent
Electoral district	NDP	Liberal	Green	Marijuana	Unity	Other	Incumbent
Abbotsford-Clayburn	Kris Lind; 2,096	John van Dongen; 12,584		John Fulford; 706	Peter Stiegelmar; 1751	Kenneth Keillor (F); 217	John van Dongen
Abbotsford-Mount Lehman	Taranjit Purewal; 2,431	Mike de Jong; 12,660	Karl Hann; 1,299	Brian Carlisle; 451	Gloria Ewert; 1576	David MacKay (PF); Robert McCulloch (F); 46	Mike de Jong
Chilliwack-Kent	Malcolm James; 2,155	Barry Penner; 13,814	Larry Commodore; 1,511	David Ferguson; 968			Barry Penner
Chilliwack-Sumas	Christine Muise; 2,434	John Les; 14,137	Norm Siefken; 1,130			Grant Cepuran (Con); 1,199	new district
Fort Langley-Aldergrove	Simon Challenger; 2,619	Rich Coleman; 16,527	Andrea Welling; 2,766	Joshua McKenzie; 674	Deanna Jopling; 1,275	Murray Dunbar (Ind.); 336	Rich Coleman
Langley	Paul Latham; 2,720	Lynn Stephens; 14,564	Pat Taylor; 2,847	Mavis Becker; 723	Gordon Nelson; 1,605		Lynn Stephens
Maple Ridge-Mission	Rose Bennett; 4,710	Randy Hawes; 12,920	Dawn Paley; 2,910	Denise Briere-Smart; 908	David Ritchie; 1,037	Dale Randall (Ind.); 252; Chum Richardson (Ind.); 63	Dennis Streifel†
Maple Ridge-Pitt Meadows	Bill Hartley; 5,764	Ken Stewart; 12,235	Mike Gildersleeve; 3,069	Rick Cameron; 716	Dave Hensman; 1,220	Michael Felgner (Act); 97	Bill Hartley

=== Surrey ===
Electoral district	Candidates						Incumbent
Electoral district	NDP	Liberal	Green	Marijuana	Unity	Other	Incumbent
Surrey-Cloverdale	Steve Oakley; 2,333	Kevin Falcon; 13,739	Steve Chitty; 2,227	Jason Elliott; 481	George Hoytema; 1,112	Bonnie McKinnon (Ind.); 1,669	Bonnie McKinnon
Surrey-Green Timbers	**Sue Hammell** ‡ 5,592	Brenda Locke; 7,539		Dennis Kalsi; 561	C. Lewis Robinson; 1,067	Jim Paterson (Ref.); 538 Harjit Daudharia (Com); 103	**Sue Hammell** ‡
Surrey-Newton	Param Grewal; 3,949	Tony Bhullar; 6,750	David Walters; 1,673	Stephen Kawamoto; 348	Paul Joshi; 498	Margaret Bridgman (Ref.); 431	**Penny Priddy** † ‡
Surrey-Panorama Ridge	Bruce Ralston; 3,240	Gulzar Cheema; 9,590	Sunny Athwal; 1,437	Randy Caine; 424	Heather Stilwell; 1,123	Shirley Abraham (Ref.); 408; Ed Weiland (Act); 50	new district
Surrey-Tynehead	Barry Bell; 3,159	Dave Hayer; 12,252	Joel Macht; 1,876	Don Briere; 385	Bill Stilwell; 1,234	Marilyn Collins (Ind.); 880; Enoch Ephraimson; 265 (Ref.) Mandir Benipal (Ind.); 50	new district
Surrey-Whalley	**Joan Smallwood** ‡ 4,536	Elayne Brenzinger; 6,693	Terry McComas; 1,652	Khalid Arnaout; 544	John A. Conway; 838	Mike Runte (Ref.); 374	**Joan Smallwood** ‡
Surrey-White Rock	Matt Todd; 3,415	Gordon Hogg; 18,678	Ruth Christine; 3,577	David Bourgeois; 536	Garry Sahl; 983		Gordon Hogg

=== Richmond and Delta ===
Electoral district	Candidates						Incumbent
Electoral district	NDP	Liberal	Green	Marijuana	Unity	Other	Incumbent
Delta North	Norm Lortie	Reni Masi	John Hague	Iain Gilfillan	Dario Todorovic		Reni Masi
Delta South	Ruth Mary Adams	Val Roddick	Rob LaBelle	Mike Hansen	Justin P. Goodrich	George Mann (Ind.); Paul Dhillon (Ind.)	Val Roddick
Richmond Centre	Jaana Grant	Greg Halsey-Brandt	Bruce Marshall	Alice Kan-Halford	Jim Hessels	Frank Tofin (Con.)	Doug Symons†
Richmond East	Willy Nasgowitz	Linda Reid	Stephen Kronstein	John Shavluk	Joe Pal	Mohamaud Farah (Ind.)	Linda Reid
Richmond-Steveston	Billie Mortimer	Geoff Plant	Kevan Hudson	Gordon Mathias	Vincent Paul	Allan Warnke (Ind.); **Barry Chilton** ‡ (Con.); Sue Wade (Ref.); Edith Petersen (PF)	Geoff Plant

=== Vancouver's Eastern Suburbs ===
Electoral district	Candidates						Incumbent
Electoral district	NDP	Liberal	Green	Marijuana	Unity	Other	Incumbent
Burnaby-Edmonds	Sav Dhaliwal; 4,691	Patty Sahota; 9,119	Eric Hawthorne; 2,476	Roy Arjun; 426	Grant Murray; 1,076	Gordon S. Watson (POC); 112	Fred Randall †
Burnaby North	Pietro Calendino; 5,735	Richard Lee; 10,520	Tom Hetherington; 2,669	Dale Ware; 415			Pietro Calendino
Burnaby-Willingdon	Dave Myles; 3,737	John Nuraney; 8,338	Joe Keithley; 2,347	Pamela Zak; 313		Dennis MacAuley (COBC); 243	**Joan Sawicki** † ‡
Burquitlam	Bart Healey; 4,475	Harry Bloy; 10,333	Steven J. Mancinelli; 3,085	Peter Grin; 630	Greg Watrich; 720		new district
Coquitlam-Maillardville	Ken Landgraff; 4,148	Richard Stewart; 10,692	Elly Petersen; 2,354	Paul Geddes; 544	Tim Bonner; 796	Harry Warren (Ind.); Doug Stead (Ind.); 160	John Cashore†
New Westminster	**Graeme Bowbrick** ‡ 6,688	Joyce Murray; 10,626	Robert Broughton; 2,799	Marlene P. Campbell; 799	Howard Irving; 571		**Graeme Bowbrick** ‡
Port Coquitlam-Burke Mountain	**Mike Farnworth** ‡ 6,964	Karn Manhas; 9,584	Kelli Gallagher; 1,765	Doug Hewer; 412	**Chris Delaney** ‡ 2,236	Clay Fanstone (Ref.); 145 Craig Braconnier (Ind.); 144	**Mike Farnworth** ‡
Port Moody-Westwood	Brian Revel; 4,045	Christy Clark; 15,967		Graeme Smecher; 1,359			Christy Clark

=== Vancouver ===
Electoral district	Candidates						Incumbent
Electoral district	NDP	Liberal	Green	Marijuana	Unity	Other	Incumbent
Vancouver-Burrard	Tim Stevenson; 7,359	Lorne Mayencourt; 11,396	Robbie Mattu; 3,826	Marc Emery; 906		Boris Bear (Ind.); 136; Joseph Theriault (PF); 40; Helvis (Rhino); 25	Tim Stevenson
Vancouver-Fairview	Anita Romaniuk; 4,772	Gary Farrell-Collins; 12,864	Vanessa Violini; 5,051	Ron MacIntyre; 651		Brian Sproule (PF); 76	Gary Farrell-Collins
Vancouver-Fraserview	**Ian Waddell** ‡ 5,815	Ken Johnston; 10,361	Merina Matthew; 1,417	Paul Emerson Hughes; 267	Paul Stilwell; 369		**Ian Waddell** ‡
Vancouver-Hastings	**Joy MacPhail** ‡ 8,009	Daniel Lee; 7,600	Ian Gregson; 2,874	Davin Ouimet; 409		Carrol B. Woolsey (SC); 222; Charles Boyland (PF); 119	**Joy MacPhail** ‡
Vancouver-Kensington	**Ujjal Dosanjh** ‡ 7,478	Patrick Wong; 9,162	Betty Krawczyk; 1,795	John Gordon; 516	John O'Flynn; 314		**Ujjal Dosanjh** ‡
Vancouver-Kingsway	Alicia Barsallo; 5,429	Rob Nijjar; 8,264	Geoff Lyon; 1,725	Steven M. Lay; 364	Sal Vetro; 541	Tyler Ducharme (COBC); 159 Donna Petersen (PF); 81	Glen Clark †
Vancouver-Langara	Peter G. Prontzos; 2,999	Val Anderson; 11,800	Doug Warkentin; 2,009	Anthony Campbell; 673		Joe Young (Ind.); 105; Michael Hill (PF); 51	Val Anderson
Vancouver-Mount Pleasant	**Jenny Kwan** ‡ 7,163	Gail Sparrow; 5,343	Dale Hofmann; 2,612	David Malmo-Levine; 489	Ken Wright; 166	Liar Liar (Ind.); 148 Kimball Cariou (Com); 142 Franklin Poley (POC); 42	**Jenny Kwan** ‡
Vancouver-Point Grey	Am Johal; 4,441	**Gordon Campbell** ‡ 13,430	Varya Rubin; 5,094	Alex Curylo; 659	Greg Dahms; 257	Anne Jamieson (PF); 43	**Gordon Campbell** ‡
Vancouver-Quilchena	Gareth Richmond; 2,168	Colin Hansen; 16,829	Judy Johnstone; 3,277	Katrina Chowe; 351		Mike Sharp (Ind.); 160	Colin Hansen

=== North Shore and Sunshine Coast ===
Electoral district	Candidates					Incumbent
Electoral district	NDP	Liberal	Green	Marijuana	Other	Incumbent
North Vancouver-Lonsdale	Roger Kishi; 3,016	Katherine Whittred; 11,362	Terry W. Long; 3,823	Darin Keith Neil; 612	Jonathan Cote (Ind.); 173	Katherine Whittred
North Vancouver-Seymour	Sheila Paterson; 2,751	Daniel Jarvis; 15,568	Evelyn Kirkaldy; 4,127	Tom Dreyer; 568	Ron Gamble (Ref.); 683; Chris McKenzie (Ind.); 209	Daniel Jarvis
Powell River-Sunshine Coast	**Gordon Wilson** ‡ 6,349	Harold Long; 9,904	**Adriane Carr** ‡ 6,316	Dana Larsen; 812		**Gordon Wilson** ‡
West Vancouver-Capilano	Matt Lovick; 1,284	Ralph Sultan; 15,556	Nora Gambioli; 2,932	Keir Vichert; 274	Jeremy Dalton (Ind.); 1,355	Jeremy Dalton
West Vancouver-Garibaldi	Barrie MacLeod; 2,330	Ted Nebbeling; 14,542	Peter Tatroff; 3,691	Robert Adam; 767		Ted Nebbeling

=== Vancouver Island ===
Electoral district	Candidates						Incumbent
Electoral district	NDP	Liberal	Green	Marijuana	Unity	Other	Incumbent
Alberni-Qualicum	Gerard Janssen; 7,395	Gillian Trumper; 13,109	Sergio Paone; 2,999	Nicholas Thorp; 1,081			Gerard Janssen
Comox Valley	Evelyn Gillespie; 5,356	Stan Hagen; 15,569	Pam Munroe; 5,170	Sylvain Beaudoin; 873	John William Robinson; 677		Evelyn Gillespie
Cowichan-Ladysmith	Rob Hutchins; 7,783	Graham Bruce; 12,707	Loren Duncan; 3,250	Larry Kunz; 597			**Jan Pullinger** † ‡
Nanaimo	Leonard Krog; 6,602	Mike Hunter; 9,748	Doug Catley; 3,810	Donald LaVallee; 889	Steve Miller; 588	Brunie Brunie (Ind.); 199	**Dale Lovick** † ‡
Nanaimo-Parksville	Jamie Brennan; 5,852	Judith Reid; 17,356	Phil Carson; 3,192	Leonard Melman; 634	Daniel Stelmacker; 693		Judith Reid
North Island	Glenn Robertson; 6,375	Rod Visser; 13,781	Ralph Keller; 2,871	Noreen Evers; 1,099			Glenn Robertson

=== Greater Victoria ===
Electoral district	Candidates						Incumbent
Electoral district	NDP	Liberal	Green	Marijuana	Unity	Other	Incumbent
Esquimalt-Metchosin	Maurine Karagianis; 6,258	Arnie Hamilton; 9,544	Marilyn Sundeen; 3,685	Christopher Davies; 534	Bob Ward; 268	Bill Clarke (Con); 322; Rick Berglund (Ind.); 105; Scott Attrill (Ind.); 68; Gerry McVeigh (Ind.); 57	Moe Sihota †
Malahat-Juan de Fuca	Richard Hughes; 3,687	Brian Kerr; 9,676	Stephen Bradley; 3,275	Ron Anderton; 547	Julie Mander; 323	Rick Kasper (Ind.); 5,164 Susan Power (Con); 222	Rick Kasper
Oak Bay-Gordon Head	Charley Beresford; 5,789	Ida Chong; 14,588	Cristin Geall; 4,666	Michael Mann; 411			Ida Chong
Saanich North and the Islands	Paul Sam; 5,011	Murray Coell; 15,406	Andrew Lewis; 7,211	Christina Racki; 491		Bathar Jensen (Ind.); 257	Murray Coell
Saanich South	David Cubberley; 6,838	Susan Brice; 12,699	Gracie MacDonald; 3,823	Tamara Tulloch; 462		Paul Scrimger (Con.); 349; James Robert Lauder (Ind.); 172	**Andrew Petter** † ‡
Victoria-Beacon Hill	Carole James; 9,262	Jeff Bray; 9,297	Walter Meyer Zu Erpen; 5,453	Troy Tompkins; 532	Gregory Hartnell; 290	Rob Botterell (Ind.); 205; Kirsten Goodacre (Com); 64	**Gretchen Brewin** † ‡
Victoria-Hillside	Steve Orcherton; 7,796	Sheila Orr; 7,878	Stuart Hertzog; 4,142	Chuck Beyer; 663	Allan Whittal; 293	George Gidora (Com); 72; Laery Braaten (CCF); 49	Steve Orcherton
