= Anita Hagen =

Canadian politician (1931–2015)

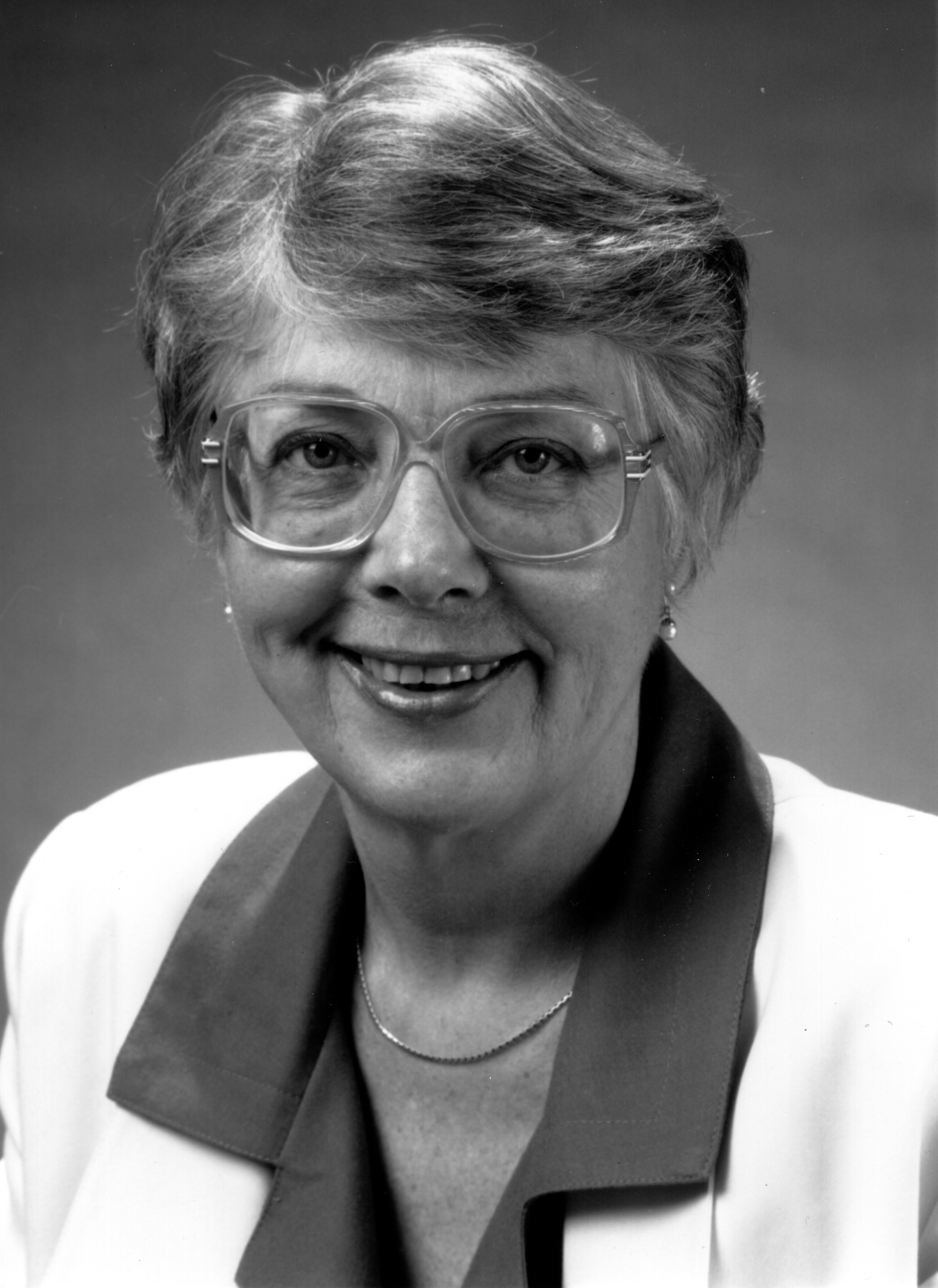

Member of the British Columbia Legislative Assembly for New Westminster
- In office October 22, 1986 – May 28, 1996
- Preceded by: Dennis Cocke
- Succeeded by: Graeme Bowbrick

4th Deputy Premier of British Columbia
- In office November 5, 1991 – September 15, 1993
- Premier: Michael Harcourt
- Preceded by: Rita Johnston
- Succeeded by: Elizabeth Cull

Minister of Education of British Columbia
- In office November 5, 1991 – September 15, 1993
- Premier: Michael Harcourt
- Preceded by: Stan Hagen
- Succeeded by: Art Charbonneau

Minister Responsible for Multiculturalism and Human Rights of British Columbia
- In office November 5, 1991 – September 15, 1993
- Premier: Michael Harcourt
- Succeeded by: Moe Sihota

Personal details
- Born: May 6, 1931 Sydney, Nova Scotia, Canada
- Died: June 5, 2015 (aged 84) Vancouver, British Columbia, Canada
- Party: New Democrat
- Spouse: John Hagen (m. 1961)
- Education: Dalhousie University
- Occupation: teacher

Anita Mae Joan Hagen (May 6, 1931 – June 5, 2015) was a Canadian politician who represented the riding of New Westminster in the Legislative Assembly of British Columbia from 1986 to 1996. As part of the British Columbia New Democratic Party (BC NDP) caucus, she served as the province's Deputy Premier, Minister of Education, and Minister Responsible for Multiculturalism and Human Rights from 1991 to 1993.

== Biography ==
She was born in Sydney, Nova Scotia in 1931, and attended Dalhousie University in Halifax, graduating with a bachelor of arts degree in 1951. She moved to New Westminster, British Columbia in 1954, and married John Hagen in 1961. She worked as an English teacher at a high school in neighbouring Surrey before being elected a New Westminster school trustee, serving from 1976 to 1986. She also worked for federal NDP member of Parliament for New Westminster—Coquitlam Pauline Jewett, and served as constituency assistant for BC NDP member of the Legislative Assembly (MLA) for New Westminster Dennis Cocke.

With Cocke retiring from the legislature, Hagen sought and won the BC NDP nomination for the riding, and was elected MLA for New Westminster at the 1986 provincial election. With the NDP in opposition, Hagen served as the party's education and seniors critic. After winning re-election in 1991, she was named to the cabinet by Premier Mike Harcourt, serving as Deputy Premier, Minister of Education, and Minister Responsible for Multiculturalism and Human Rights in the NDP government. She stepped down from cabinet in 1993, then retired from active politics in 1996 at the age of 65.

In 2005, she campaigned against replacing the existing first-past-the-post electoral system with a single transferable vote system (BC-STV) in the electoral reform referendum. She died of cancer at Vancouver General Hospital in June 2015; she was survived by husband John and two sons.
