= David Whiteside =

Canadian politician (1870–1947)

Member of the Legislative Assembly for New Westminster
- In office September 14, 1916 – June 20, 1924
- Preceded by: Thomas Gifford (Note: Gifford was the incumbent MLA for New Westminster City, the riding that was replaced by New Westminster in 1916.)
- Succeeded by: Edwin James Rothwell

Personal details
- Born: February 6, 1870 Scarborough Township, Ontario, Canada
- Died: March 8, 1947 (aged 77) Coquitlam, British Columbia, Canada
- Party: Liberal
- Spouse: Annie Clarke Richmond (m. 1903)
- Children: two
- Profession: lawyer, judge

David Whiteside (February 6, 1870 – March 8, 1947) was a Canadian politician. He served in the Legislative Assembly of British Columbia from 1916 to 1924, as a Liberal member for the constituency of New Westminster. While he did not seek re-election in the 1924 provincial election, he did run unsuccessfully as a BC Liberal candidate in the 1928 provincial election in the Dewdney constituency and as an Independent candidate endorsed by the Independent Co-operative Commonwealth Federation association in the 1933 provincial election in the New Westminster constituency.

Born in the Toronto suburb of Scarborough Township, Ontario, he was a lawyer and judge, educated at Osgoode Hall Law School and first called to the Ontario Bar in 1895. Moving to British Columbia in 1899, he first settled in Rossland, British Columbia, then Phoenix, British Columbia. He practiced law with James Alexander MacDonald under the firm Macdonald & Whiteside in Grand Forks, British Columbia from 1902 to 1909. He practiced under the firm Whiteside, Edmonds & Whiteside in New Westminster starting in 1912 until 1925, when he entered the practice of McQuarrie, Whiteside & Duncan. In 1938, he was appointed as a judge on the County Court Bench. He died in Coquitlam in 1947. It is unclear if he is related to Jennifer Whiteside, who would later represent the same New Westminster riding from 2020 to 2024.
