= Doug Clovechok =

Canadian politician

Member of the British Columbia Legislative Assembly for Columbia River-Revelstoke
- In office May 9, 2017 – October 19, 2024
- Preceded by: Norm Macdonald
- Succeeded by: Scott McInnis

Personal details
- Party: BC United
- Spouse: Susan Clovechok
- Profession: Teacher

Doug Clovechok is a Canadian politician, who was elected to the Legislative Assembly of British Columbia from 2017 provincial election until 2024. He represented the electoral district of Columbia River-Revelstoke as a member of the BC United caucus. In Opposition, he served as the Whip of the Official Opposition as well as the critic for Columbia Basin Initiatives and the critic for Tourism, Arts and Culture. On February 24, 2024, he announced he would not be seeking a third term in the Legislature.

Clovechok had previously run in 2013 in the same riding but was unsuccessful against incumbent Norm Macdonald. In his second attempt in 2017, he was elected over Gerry Taft in what was considered somewhat of an upset. The loss was attributed to a defamation suit that Taft lost during the middle of the campaign.

Prior to his election, he was a high school teacher with the Calgary Board of Education. He ran in a 1993 by-election for Calgary City Council but lost to Bob Hawkesworth. He served for 20 years as the CEO of the Calgary Education Partnership Foundation. He was the Campus Manager of the College of the Rockies at Invermere.

== Electoral record ==
2020 British Columbia general election: Columbia River-Revelstoke
| Party | Candidate | Votes | % | ±% | Expenditures |
|---|---|---|---|---|---|
| Liberal | Doug Clovechok | 7,034 | 48.03 | +2.59 | $45,602.42 |
| New Democratic | Nicole Cherlet | 5,708 | 38.97 | +2.95 | $21,352.76 |
| Green | Samson Boyer | 1,904 | 13.00 | +1.28 | $1,036.37 |
| Total valid votes | | 14,646 | 100.00 | – | |
| Total rejected ballots | | | | | |
| Turnout | | | | | |
| Registered voters | | | | | |
Source: Elections BC

2017 British Columbia general election: Columbia River-Revelstoke
| Party | Candidate | Votes | % | Expenditures |
|---|---|---|---|---|
| Liberal | Doug Clovechok | 6,620 | 45.44 | $68,902 |
| New Democratic | Gerry Taft | 5,248 | 36.02 | $41,126 |
| Green | Samson Boyer | 1,708 | 11.72 | $1,300 |
| Independent | Duncan Boyd MacLeod | 469 | 3.22 | |
| Independent | Justin James Hooles | 371 | 2.55 | $2,267 |
| Libertarian | Rylan Kashuba | 154 | 1.05 | |
| Total valid votes | | 14,570 | 100.00 | |
| Total rejected ballots | | 66 | 0.45 | |
| Turnout | | 14,636 | 59.79 | |
Source: Elections BC

2013 British Columbia general election: Columbia River-Revelstoke
| Party | Candidate | Votes | % |
|---|---|---|---|
| New Democratic | Norm Macdonald | 6,463 | 48.26 |
| Liberal | Doug Clovechok | 4,847 | 36.19 |
| Conservative | Earl Olsen | 1,162 | 8.68 |
| Green | Laurel Ralston | 921 | 6.88 |
| Total valid votes | | 13,393 | 100.00 |
| Total rejected ballots | | 45 | 0.33 |
| Turnout | | 13,438 | 53.60 |
Source: Elections BC
