= Airspace Action on Smoking and Health =

Canadian anti-smoking organization

Airspace Action on Smoking and Health (formerly Airspace Non-smokers' Rights Society) was a volunteer-based anti-tobacco organization in the Canadian province of British Columbia.

Airspace Non-smokers' Rights Society was initially founded in Victoria in the late 1970s and successfully lobbied for one of Canada's first ever smoking control by-laws. Dale Jackaman, then Secretary of the Victoria organization, moved to Vancouver in 1984. He and Norm Gillan founded the Vancouver branch of Airspace, and Jackaman was its first Executive Director. Jackaman then amalgamated both the Victoria and Namaimo organizations (run by Errol Povah) and formed what became the province-wide Airspace organization.

The Presidents and Executive Directors of Airspace include Jackaman, Deborah Wotherspoon, Jerry Steinberg, Robert Broughton (activist), Heather Mackenzie, and Povah, respectively.

One aspect of the Airspace organization was its early adoption of computer technology to facilitate its activist activities. Airspace was probably the first organization of its kind to adopt a modem based bulletin board system (BBS). Airspace was also one of the first organizations of this nature to have a web site. Some screen shots from an early version of the site turned up in internal documents from Philip Morris.

The organization's public persona was the Grim Reaper, used it to create a form of street theatre at tobacco promotions. In 1999, the Grim Reaper street-theatre persona received media coverage when Airspace activists protested against du Maurier for sponsoring the Tea Party and Big Surgar concert in Whistler, British Columbia.

In 1993, the New Democratic Party government of the day announced regulations to prevent the sale of cigarettes to children. Airspace organized a "compliance check" (or "kiddie sting"). Ten Airspace volunteers escorted five youths aged 12 to 16 who attempted to purchase cigarettes. They visited a total of 65 tobacco retailers, and 43% of them were willing to sell cigarettes to the underaged person. This effort got significant press attention, and Burnaby-Edmonds MLA Fred Randall pressed for stronger regulations, such as stiffer fines and suspensions. The provincial government started doing compliance checks of its own to measure the effectiveness of this effort.

During the early 1990s, Airspace staged regular protests in front of Imperial Tobacco's Vancouver office. These protests included an annual "Modified Christmas Caroling", using "Clean Air Carols ". These protests came to an end when Imperial Tobacco (the Canadian branch of BAT) closed the Vancouver office and moved their Western Canada operations to Calgary.

With most of the organization's objectives met, Airspace decided to dissolve itself in December, 2021.

== See also ==
- Tobacco control
