= James Orr (Canadian politician) =

Canadian politician

James Orr (April 23, 1826 – November 6, 1905) was an English-born political figure in British Columbia. He represented New Westminster in the Legislative Assembly of British Columbia from 1882 until his defeat in the 1890 provincial election. He never again sought provincial office in British Columbia.

He was born in Liverpool, the son of the Reverend Dean Orr, and came to America with his family at the age of six. Orr was educated in the United States and Ontario. He served as Clerk of the Police Court and Clerk Assessor and Collector for New Westminster. He explored for a railway route on behalf of the Colony of British Columbia in 1865. Orr also served as deputy paymaster for the Canadian Pacific Railway and operated a fishery in the Haida Gwaii area. He was a member of the Legislative Council of British Columbia in 1863 and 1865. Orr was defeated when he ran for a seat in the assembly in 1878. He died in Victoria.
