= New Westminster (provincial electoral district) =

Defunct provincial electoral district in British Columbia, Canada

British Columbia electoral district

Defunct provincial electoral district
- Legislature: Legislative Assembly of British Columbia
- First contested: 1871
- Last contested: 2020

Demographics
- Census division: Metro Vancouver
- Census subdivision: New Westminster

New Westminster is a former provincial electoral district for the Legislative Assembly of British Columbia, Canada. It was the final electoral district from the first British Columbia election of 1871 to continually exist until its abolition at the call of the 2024 election.

The riding is notable in a variety of ways. It never voted for a Social Credit candidate during the Socred's era of dominance between 1952 and 1991. It was also represented by Byron Ingemar Johnson, the 24th premier of British Columbia.

During the 1990s, the riding was represented by Anita Hagen, who served as deputy premier of British Columbia and minister of Education from 1991 to 1993 during the premiership of Mike Harcourt. Hagen was replaced by Graeme Bowbrick in 1996, who served as minister of Advanced Education in 2000, and attorney general from 2000 to 2001.

Under the 2021 British Columbia electoral redistribution the riding was dissolved into Burnaby-New Westminster and New Westminster-Coquitlam.

== Members of the Legislative Assembly of British Columbia ==
=== Dual-member district (1871–1886) ===
Assembly	Years	Seat 1		Seat 2	
Assembly	Years	Member	Party	Member	Party
1st	1871–1875	William James Armstrong	Opposition	Josiah Charles Hughes	Opposition
2nd	1875–1878	William James Armstrong	Government	Ebenezer Brown	Independent-Government
3rd	1878–1882	Wellington John Harris	Government	Donald McGillivray	Government
4th	1882–1886	John Robson	Opposition	James Orr	Opposition

=== Triple-member district (1886–1890) ===
Assembly	Years	Seat 1		Seat 2		Seat 3	
Assembly	Years	Member	Party	Member	Party	Member	Party
5th	1886–1890	John Robson	Government	William Henry Ladner	Opposition	James Orr	Opposition
Riding replaced by Westminster

=== Single-member district (1916–2024) ===
Assembly	Years	Member	Party
Riding re-created from New Westminster City
14th	1916–1920	David Whiteside	Liberal
15th	1920–1924	David Whiteside	Liberal
16th	1924–1928	Edwin James Rothwell	Liberal
17th	1928–1933	Arthur Wellesley Gray	Liberal
18th	1933–1937	Arthur Wellesley Gray	Liberal
19th	1937–1941	Arthur Wellesley Gray	Liberal
20th	1941–1945	Arthur Wellesley Gray	Liberal
21st	1945–1949	Byron Ingemar Johnson	Coalition
22nd	1949–1952	Byron Ingemar Johnson	Coalition
22nd	1952–1952	Byron Ingemar Johnson	Liberal
23rd	1952–1952	Rae Eddie	Co-operative Commonwealth
24th	1953–1956	Rae Eddie	Co-operative Commonwealth
25th	1956–1960	Rae Eddie	Co-operative Commonwealth
26th	1960–1963	Rae Eddie	Co-operative Commonwealth
27th	1963–1966	Rae Eddie	New Democratic
28th	1966–1969	Rae Eddie	New Democratic
29th	1969–1972	Dennis Cocke	New Democratic
30th	1972–1975	Dennis Cocke	New Democratic
31st	1975–1979	Dennis Cocke	New Democratic
32nd	1979–1983	Dennis Cocke	New Democratic
33rd	1983–1986	Dennis Cocke	New Democratic
34th	1986–1991	Anita Hagen	New Democratic
35th	1991–1996	Anita Hagen	New Democratic
36th	1996–2001	Graeme Bowbrick	New Democratic
37th	2001–2005	Joyce Murray	Liberal
38th	2005–2009	Chuck Puchmayr	New Democratic
39th	2009–2013	Dawn Black	New Democratic
40th	2013–2017	Judy Darcy	New Democratic
41st	2017–2020	Judy Darcy	New Democratic
42nd	2020–2024	Jennifer Whiteside	New Democratic
Riding dissolved into Burnaby-New Westminster and New Westminster-Coquitlam

== Election results ==
=== 2020 ===
2020 British Columbia general election
Party	Candidate	Votes	%	±%	Expenditures
New Democratic	Jennifer Whiteside	15,903	60.25	+8.32	$31,579.21
Green	Cyrus Sy	5,020	19.02	−6.05	$18,803.70
Liberal	Lorraine Brett	4,291	16.26	−4.94	$9,107.81
Conservative	Benny Ogden	912	3.46	–	$0.00
Libertarian	Donald Wilson	269	1.02	+0.30	$0.00
Total valid votes/expense limit		26,395	100.00	–	$66,123.96
Total rejected ballots		146	0.55	+0.16	
Turnout		26,541	56.20	–7.41	
Registered voters		47,226			
New Democratic hold		Swing		+7.19	
Source: Elections BC

=== 2018 electoral reform referendum ===
2018 British Columbia electoral reform referendum: Question 1
Choice	Votes	%
Proportional representation	9,596	50.96
First Past the Post	9,236	49.04
Total valid votes	18,832	100.0
Total rejected ballots	191	1.00
Source: Elections BC

2018 British Columbia electoral reform referendum: Question 2
System	Ballot 1		Ballot 2	
System	Votes	%	Votes	%
Mixed-Member Proportional	6,113	45.21	8,399	64.67
Dual-Member Proportional	3,925	29.03	4,589	35.33%
Rural–Urban Proportional	3,484	25.77	Eliminated	
Source: Elections BC

=== 2017 ===
2017 British Columbia general election
Party	Candidate	Votes	%	±%	Expenditures
New Democratic	Judy Darcy	14,377	51.93	+3.09	$64,541
Green	Jonina Campbell	6,939	25.07	+16.72	$31,266
Liberal	Lorraine Brett	5,870	21.20	−12.17	$24,848
Social Credit	James Crosty	298	1.08	–	$3,877
Libertarian	Rex Brocki	199	0.72	+0.02	$0
Total valid votes		27,683	100.00	–	
Total rejected ballots		108	0.39	−0.10	
Turnout		27,791	63.61	+5.80	
Registered voters		43,690			
Source: Elections BC

=== 2013 ===
2013 British Columbia general election
Party	Candidate	Votes	%	±%	Expenditures
New Democratic	Judy Darcy	13,170	48.84	−7.52	$126,704
Liberal	Hector Bremner	8,997	33.37	−1.24	$56,036
Green	Terry Teather	2,252	8.35	−0.68	$1,417
Conservative	Paul Forseth	1,318	4.89	−	$1,450
Independent	James Crosty	1,038	3.85	−	#3,530
Libertarian	Lewis Dahlby	190	0.70	−	$250
Total valid votes		26,965	100.00		
Total rejected ballots		132	0.49		
Turnout		27,097	57.81		
Source: Elections BC

=== 2009 ===
2009 British Columbia general election
Party	Candidate	Votes	%	±%	Expenditures
New Democratic	Dawn Black	13,418	56.36	+5.04	$80,256
Liberal	Carole Millar	8,240	34.61	−2.81	$24,880
Green	Matthew Laird	2,151	9.03	−0.34	$5,214
Total valid votes		23,809	100		
Total rejected ballots		137	0.57		
Turnout		23,946	55.99		
New Democratic hold		Swing		+3.93	

=== 2005 ===
2005 British Columbia general election
Party	Candidate	Votes	%	±%	Expenditures
New Democratic	Chuck Puchmayr	13,226	51.32	+20.30	$61,892
Liberal	Joyce Murray	9,645	37.42	−11.78	$135,015
Green	Robert Broughton	2,416	9.37	−3.90	$1,417
Marijuana	Christina Racki	293	1.14	−2.68	$100
Democratic Reform	John Robinson Warren	152	0.59	–	$410
Platinum	Greg Calcutta	42	0.16	–	$100
Total valid votes		25,774	100.00		
Total rejected ballots		166	0.64	+0.14	
Turnout		25,940	63.91	−6.5	
New Democratic gain from Liberal		Swing		+16.04	

=== 2001 ===
37th British Columbia election, 2001
Party	Candidate	Votes	%	±	Expenditures
Liberal	Joyce Murray	11,059	49.20%		$47,701
New Democratic	Graeme Bowbrick	6,971	31.02%		$26,704
Green	Robert Broughton	2,982	13.27%		$3,401
Marijuana	Marlene P. Campbell	859	3.82%		$394
Unity	Howard Vernon Irving	604	2.69%		
Total Valid Votes		22,475	100.00%		
Total Rejected Ballots		113	0.50%		
Turnout		22,588	71.07%		

=== 1996 ===
36th British Columbia election, 1996
Party	Candidate	Votes	%	±	Expenditures
New Democratic	Graeme Bowbrick	10,418	46.69%		$29,591
Liberal	Helen Sparkes	8,591	38.50%		$34,673
Reform	Brian Stromgren	1,446	6.48%		
Progressive Democrat	Craig Sahlin	1,121	5.02%		
Green	Michael G. Horn	488	2.19%		$145
Independent	Arthur Crossman	142	0.64%		
Natural Law	George Bauch	107	0.48%		$224
Total Valid Votes		22,313	100.00%		
Total Rejected Ballots		133	0.59%		
Turnout		22,446	70.41%		

=== 1991 ===
35th British Columbia election, 1991
Party	Candidate	Votes	%	±	Expenditures
New Democratic	Anita Hagen	10,384	49.89%		$24,062
Liberal	Lori MacDonald	7,117	34.20%		$2,534
Social Credit	Tom Baker	3,311	15.91%		$26,509
Total Valid Votes		20,812	100.00%		
Total Rejected Ballots		395	1.86%		
Turnout		21,207	72.32%		

=== 1986 ===
1986 British Columbia general election
Party	Candidate	Votes	%
New Democratic	Anita Hagen	10,120	49.75
Social Credit	Dwight Maxwell Ross	8,949	43.99
Liberal	Timothy E. Courtney	1,200	5.90
Communist	Roderick Doran	73	0.36
Total valid votes		20,342	100.00
Total rejected ballots		245	

=== 1983 ===
33rd British Columbia election, 1983
Party	Candidate	Votes	%	±	Expenditures
New Democratic	Dennis Geoffrey Cocke	11,455	56.52%		unknown
Social Credit	Barry David Butler	8,224	40.57%		unknown
Liberal	John Ian Paterson	590	2.91%		unknown
Total valid votes		20,269	100.00%		
Total rejected ballots		233			
Turnout		%			

=== 1979 ===
32nd British Columbia election, 1979
Party	Candidate	Votes	%	±	Expenditures
New Democratic	Dennis Geoffrey Cocke	11,343	59.30%		unknown
Social Credit	Malvern James Hughes	7,786	40.70%		unknown
Total valid votes		19,129	100.00%		
Total rejected ballots		292			
Turnout		%			

=== 1975 ===
31st British Columbia election, 1975
Party	Candidate	Votes	%	±	Expenditures
New Democratic	Dennis Geoffrey Cocke	10,357	55.63%		unknown
Social Credit	Alexander John Seigo	8,473	44.35%		unknown
Liberal	Karl Franke	923	4.83%		unknown
Communist	Roderick Doran	60	0.31%		unknown
Total valid votes		19,106	100.00%		
Total rejected ballots		166			
Turnout		%			

=== 1972 ===
30th British Columbia election, 1972
Party	Candidate	Votes	%	±	Expenditures
New Democratic	Dennis Geoffrey Cocke	10,357	55.63%		unknown
Social Credit	John Earl Edmondson	5,306	28.50%		unknown
Liberal	Carl L. Miller	2,953	15.86%		unknown
Total valid votes		18,616	100.00%		
Total rejected ballots		287			
Turnout		%			

=== 1969 ===
29th British Columbia election, 1969
Party	Candidate	Votes	%	±	Expenditures
New Democratic	Dennis Geoffrey Cocke	7,280	40.75%		unknown
Social Credit	John Earl Edmondson	7,161	40.08%		unknown
Liberal	Dennis Douglas George Milne	3,368	18.85%		unknown
Communist	Harry Harris	57	0.32%		unknown
Total valid votes		17,866	100.00%		
Total rejected ballots		221			
Turnout		%			

=== 1966 ===
28th British Columbia election, 1966
Party	Candidate	Votes	%	±	Expenditures
New Democratic	Rae Eddie	5,751	44.65%		unknown
Social Credit	Edith Maud Corrigan	5,552	43.11%		unknown
Liberal	Robert James Cooper	1,577	12.24%		unknown
Total valid votes		12,880	100.00%		
Total rejected ballots		160			
Turnout		%			

=== 1963 ===
27th British Columbia election, 1963
Party	Candidate	Votes	%	±	Expenditures
New Democratic	Rae Eddie	5,035	37.57%		unknown
Social Credit	Edith Maud Corrigan	4,717	35.19%		unknown
Liberal	George Herbert Barrett	2,335	17.42%		unknown
Progressive Conservative	G. Basil Raikes	1,316	9.82%		unknown
Total valid votes		13,403	100.00%		
Total rejected ballots		98			
Turnout		%			

=== 1960 ===
26th British Columbia election, 1960
Party	Candidate	Votes	%	±	Expenditures
Co-operative Commonwealth	Rae Eddie	6,496	41.25%		unknown
Social Credit	Stanley Desmond Kermeen	5,041	32.01%		
Liberal	Samuel Thomas Dare	2,519	16.00%		unknown
Progressive Conservative	Frederick Craig Munroe	1,691	10.74%		unknown
Total valid votes		15,747	100.00%		
Total rejected ballots		127			
Turnout		%			

=== 1956 ===
1956 British Columbia general election
Party	Candidate	Votes	%
Co-operative Commonwealth	Rae Eddie	4,469	38.83
Social Credit	Stanley Desmond Kermeen	4,176	36.28
Liberal	Stewart Alsbury	2,220	19.29
Independent Social Credit	J. Lewis Sangster	645	5.60
Total valid votes		11,510	100.00
Total rejected ballots		82	

=== 1953 ===
1953 British Columbia general election
Party	Candidate	Votes 1st count	%	Votes final count	%
Co-operative Commonwealth	Rae Eddie	4,903	37.02	5,970	51.34
Liberal	Fred H. Jackson	4,309	32.53	5,658	48.66
Social Credit League	Malvin A. Olsen	3,787	28.59		
Labour Progressive	Alfred Dewhurst	157	1.19		
Christian Democratic	Mervin Casper	89	0.67		
Total valid votes		13,245	100.00	11,628	100.00
Total rejected ballots		486			
Turnout		77.94			
Note: Preferential ballot: 1st and 4th counts of four shown only

=== 1952 ===
1952 British Columbia general election
Party	Candidate	Votes 1st count	%	Votes final count	%
Co-operative Commonwealth	Rae Eddie	4,262	29.68	6,475	52.89
Liberal	Byron Ingemar Johnson	4,317	30.07	5,768	47.11
Social Credit League	Wilbur Watson Lyle	3,616	25.18		
Progressive Conservative	Elizabeth C. Wood	2,163	15.06		
Total valid votes		14,358	100.00	12,243	100.00
Total rejected ballots		437			
Turnout		77.94			
Note: Preferential ballot: 1st and 3rd counts of three shown only

=== 1949 ===
1949 British Columbia general election
Party	Candidate	Votes	%
Coalition	Byron Ingemar Johnson	7,969	61.57
Co-operative Commonwealth	George Henry Mitchell	4,509	34.84
Social Credit	Wilbur Watson Lyle	328	2.53
People's	Edward Charles Mills	137	1.06
Total valid votes		12,943	100.00
Total rejected ballots		125	

=== 1945 ===
21st British Columbia election, 1945
Party	Candidate	Votes	%	±	Expenditures
Coalition	Byron Ingemar Johnson ^{8}	4,900	57.91%		unknown
Co-operative Commonwealth	Clifford Augustine Greer	2,967	35.06%		unknown
Labor-Progressive	Charles Stewart	595	7.03%		unknown
Total valid votes		8,462	100.00%		
Total rejected ballots		94			
Turnout		%			
^{8} 23rd Premier of British Columbia

=== 1941 ===
20th British Columbia election, 1941
Party	Candidate	Votes	%	±	Expenditures
Liberal	Arthur Wellesley Gray	3,694	41.74%		unknown
Co-operative Commonwealth	Stanley Blake	2,387	26.97%		unknown
Conservative (historical)	Mary Dorothea McBride	1,923	21.73%		unknown
Labour	Edward Charles Mills	845	9.55%		unknown
Total valid votes		8,849	100.00%		
Total rejected ballots		178			
Turnout		%			

=== 1937 ===
19th British Columbia election, 1937
Party	Candidate	Votes	%	±	Expenditures
Liberal	Arthur Wellesley Gray	4,055	52.02%		unknown
Conservative (historical)	Thomas Robert Selkirk	1,766	22.66%		unknown
Co-operative Commonwealth	Stanley Blake	1,321	16.95%		unknown
Communist	Edwin Henry Baker	567	7.27%		unknown
Labour	Edward Charles Mills	86	1.10%		unknown
Total valid votes		7,795	100.00%		
Total rejected ballots		116			
Turnout		%			

=== 1933 ===
18th British Columbia election, 1933
Party	Candidate	Votes	%	±	Expenditures
Liberal	Arthur Wellesley Gray	2,694	46.98%		unknown
Co-operative Commonwealth	Daniel McGrath	1,476	25.74%		unknown
Independent	David Whiteside ^{1}	1,439	25.10%		unknown
United Front (Workers and Farmers)	Douglas Thomas	125	2.18%		unknown
Total valid votes		5,734	100.00%		
Total rejected ballots		67			
Turnout		%			
^{1} Endorsed by the Independent CCF.

=== 1928 ===
17th British Columbia election, 1928
Party	Candidate	Votes	%	±	Expenditures
Liberal	Arthur Wellesley Gray ^{6}	3.262	56.16%		unknown
Conservative (historical)	Albert Morris Sanford	2,546	43.84%		unknown
Total valid votes		5,808	100.00%		
Total rejected ballots		205			
Turnout		%			
^{6} "Wells Gray", namesake and instigator of the provincial park of that name in the Cariboo Mountains.

=== 1924 ===
16th British Columbia election, 1924
Party	Candidate	Votes	%	±	Expenditures
Liberal	Edwin James Rothwell	1,564	37.61%		unknown
Conservative (historical)	Albert Morris Sanford	1,310	31.51%		unknown
Labour	Richard Carter Higgins	693	16.67%		unknown
Provincial	George Livingstone Cassady	591	14.21%		unknown
Total valid votes		4,158	100.00%		
Total rejected ballots					
Turnout		%			

=== 1920 ===
1920 British Columbia general election
Party	Candidate	Votes	%
Liberal	David Whiteside	1,980	43.07
Soldier–Labour	William James Sloan ^{5}	1,611	35.04
Conservative	Thomas Gifford	1,006	21.88
Total valid votes		4,597	100.00
^{5} Also referred to as an Independent. Nominated by delegates representing the Great War Veterans Association, the GAUV, the B.C. Fisherman's Protective Association, the Army and Navy Veterans, and organized labour.

=== 1916 ===
1916 British Columbia general election
Party	Candidate	Votes	%
Liberal	David Whiteside	1,369	53.59%
Conservative	Thomas Gifford	1,186	46.42%
Total valid votes		2,555	100.00%
Total rejected ballots			
Turnout		%	

=== 1886 ===
1886 British Columbia general election
Party	Candidate	Votes	%	Elected
Government	John Robson	420	18.67	✓
Opposition	James Orr	358	15.92	✓
Opposition	William Henry Ladner	365	16.23	✓
Government	Herbert John Kirkland	348	15.47	
Opposition	Donald McGillivray	331	14.72	
Independent	Lewis Arthur Agassiz	142	6.31	
Independent	William Isaac	17	0.76	
Independent	Henry Dawson	11	0.49	
Independent	James Kennedy	7	0.31	
Government	Allen Casey Wells	250	11.12	
Total valid votes		2,249	100.00	
Source: Elections BC

=== 1883 by-election ===
British Columbia provincial by-election, February 1883 Resignation of John Robson upon appointment to Executive Council
Party	Candidate	Votes	%
Government	John Robson	acclaimed	n/a
Source: Elections BC

=== 1882 ===
1882 British Columbia general election
Party	Candidate	Votes	%	Elected
Opposition	John Robson	262	37.01	✓
Opposition	James Orr	168	23.73	✓
Opposition	Herbert John Kirkland	127	17.94	
Government	William Henry Ladner	76	10.73	
Opposition	Henry Dawson	60	8.47	
Government	William Isaac	15	2.12	
Total valid votes		708	100.00	
Source: Elections BC

=== 1878 ===
1878 British Columbia general election
Party	Candidate	Votes	%	Elected
Government	Donald McGillivray	202	28.86	✓
Government	Wellington John Harris	171	24.43	✓
Opposition	James Orr	153	21.86	
Opposition	Henry Mathers	130	18.57	
Independent	James Kennedy	44	6.28	
Total valid votes		700	100.00	
Source: Elections BC

=== 1875 ===
1875 British Columbia general election
Party	Candidate	Votes	%	Elected
Independent Government	Ebenezer Brown	154	26.15	✓
Government	William James Armstrong	153	25.98	✓
Reform caucus	Donald McGillivray	117	19.86	
Reform caucus	Jeremiah Rogers ^{2}	111	18.84	
Government	William M. Campbell	54	9.17	
Total valid votes		589	100.00	
^{2} Noted lumberman on False Creek/English Bay

=== 1871 ===
1871 British Columbia general election
Party	Candidate	Votes	%	Elected
Independent	Josiah Charles Hughes	148	45.82	✓
Independent	William James Armstrong	128	39.63	✓
Independent	Hugh McRoberts	47	14.55	
Total valid votes		323	100.00	
Source: Elections BC

== See also ==
- List of British Columbia provincial electoral districts
- Canadian provincial electoral districts

Legislative Assembly of British Columbia
Preceded by Victoria City	Constituency represented by the premier 1947–1952	Succeeded by South Okanagan
Preceded by Surrey-Newton	Constituency represented by the deputy premier 1991–1993	Succeeded by Oak Bay-Gordon Head
Preceded by Victoria-Beacon Hill	Constituency represented by the leader of the Opposition; 2011	Succeeded by Vancouver-Kingsway
