= Norm Macdonald (politician) =

Canadian politician

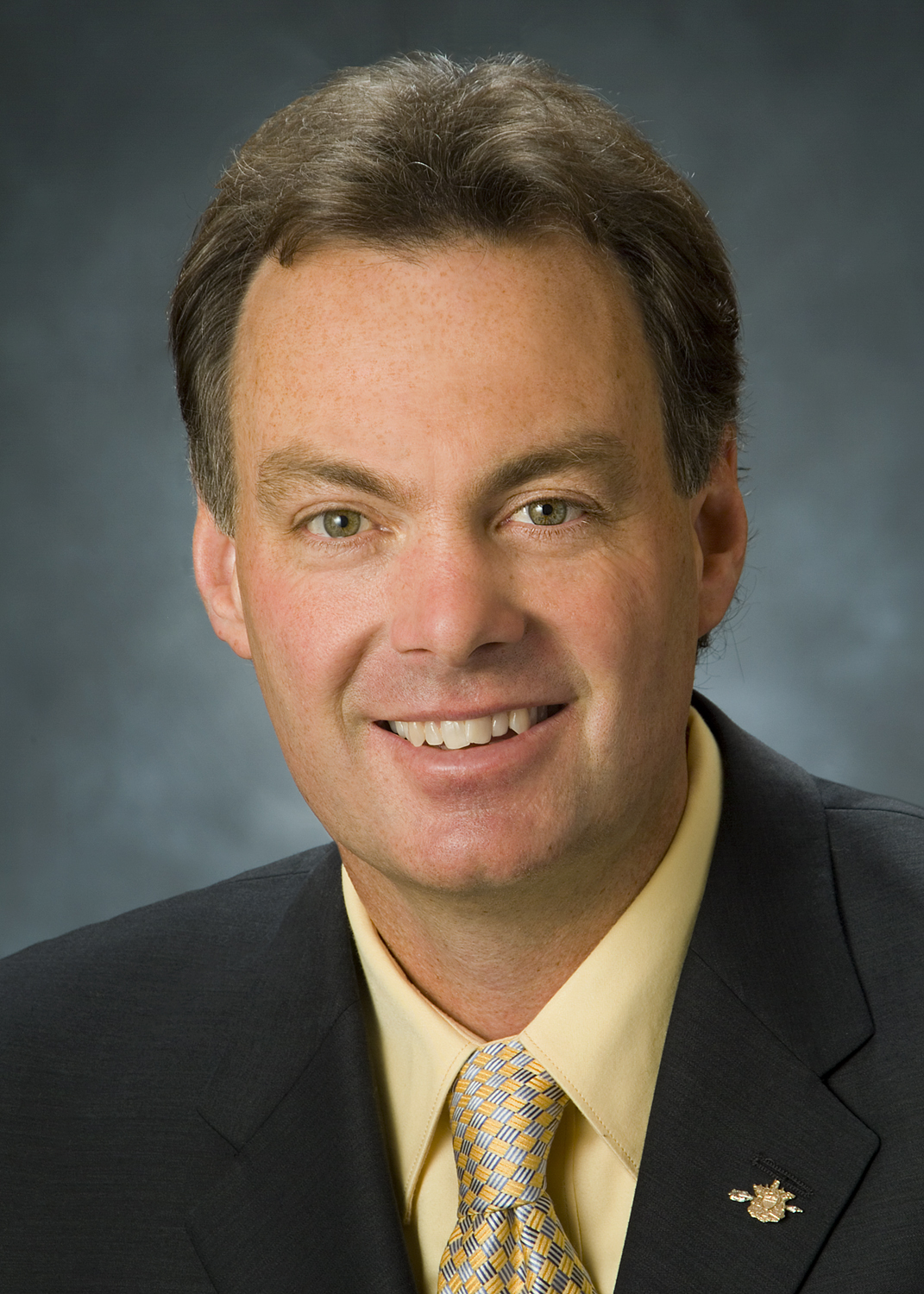

Member of the British Columbia Legislative Assembly for Columbia River-Revelstoke
- In office May 17, 2005 – May 9, 2017
- Preceded by: Wendy McMahon
- Succeeded by: Doug Clovechok

Mayor of Golden
- In office December 1996 – December 1999
- Succeeded by: Walter Scott

Personal details
- Party: BC New Democratic Party
- Spouse: Karen
- Occupation: Teacher, school principal

Norm Macdonald is a Canadian politician who served as a Member of the Legislative Assembly of British Columbia in the 38th, 39th and 40th Parliament of British Columbia, from 2005 to 2017. As a member of the BC New Democratic Party, he was elected to represent the riding of Columbia River-Revelstoke in the 2005 provincial election and re-elected in the 2009 election and 2013 election. Macdonald introduced one private member bill, the British Columbia Open Mining Act, 2014 (Bill M-214), that would have amended the Mines Act to create a Public Electronic Registry to make all mine-related applications, licences, permits, and inspection reports to be publicly visible. In all those parliaments his NDP formed the official opposition and Macdonald acted as their critic on various issues, including municipal affairs, then critic for tourism, sport and arts, and then education during the 38th Parliament of British Columbia, then forests and natural resource operations in the 39th and 40th Parliaments. During the 2011 and the 2014 NDP leadership elections, Macdonald endorsed Mike Farnworth, though Adrian Dix and John Horgan became the leaders of the BC NDP.

Prior to becoming an MLA, he was principal of Nicholson Elementary School in Golden and has more than 20 years teaching experience. Macdonald was also previously a town councillor and mayor of Golden.

== Background ==
Like his father, Macdonald worked as a teacher for most of his life. He taught at a First Nation school in Manitoba for a short time before moving to the Columbia Valley where he taught at a secondary school. Living in the small town of Golden, British Columbia, he served one term, between 1993 and 1996, as a municipal councillor and one term, between 1996 and 1999, as its mayor. He has also taught for a total of six years in Tanzania and Lesotho, Africa. Once back in British Columbia, he became the principal (as well as a teacher) at Nicholson Elementary School, a rural school south of Golden.

As the BC New Democratic Party were preparing for the up-coming 2005 provincial election, Macdonald put his name forward as a potential candidate for the Columbia River-Revelstoke electoral district. At the November 2004 nomination meeting, attended by party leader Carole James, in Windermere, Macdonald was selected, with a 75% vote, over Kimberley-resident Brent Bush to be the BC NDP candidate.

== Provincial politics ==
With the election set for May 2005, Macdonald continued working at his teaching job while travelling on weekends to build his support network. The incumbent MLA, Wendy McMahon of the governing BC Liberals, was promoted to a ministerial position (Minister of Women's' and Seniors' Services) in December 2004 and major improvements to Kicking Horse Canyon Highway and rural roads were announced. However, Macdonald's campaign highlighted provincial services that had suffered since the 2001 election, such as the closure of several schools, the closure of the Kimberley hospital, reduced capacity at extended care facilities in Golden and Revelstoke, and the elimination of conservation officers. He also campaigned on his ability to provide better representation of local issues and was supported with campaign stops in the area, in late April, from party leader Carole James. Despite the late entrance by a Green Party candidate, who did not campaign in the riding, Macdonald won the election with over 50% of the vote, though his party lost the provincial election to the BC Liberals who formed their second majority government. Macdonald spent $38,430 on his campaign, the lowest amount of all the winning candidates.

=== 38th Parliament ===
As the 38th Parliament began, Macdonald was assigned to be his party's critic for Municipal Affairs. In a June 2006 critic shuffle, Macdonald was reassigned to Tourism, Sport and Arts and then to Education critic in their August 2008 shuffle. On provincial issues he spoke out against the 2005 back-to-work legislation for teachers and Bill 30 which exempted independent power producers from local government review, a bill that allowed hotels in provincial parks, a reorganization of Office of the Fire Commissioner which resulted in fewer rural fire officials. He worked with fellow NDP MLAs Scott Fraser and Maurine Karagianis on a bill called First Nations Heritage Protection and Conservation Act which was introduced into the Legislative Assembly by Karagianis in May 2008, though it did not move past first reading. He called for a "seniors representative", similar to the province's Children's Representative and he hosted a forum in his riding to discuss seniors-specific issues. He joined a NDP delegation who traveled to Taiwan to promote tourism and economic issues. Macdonald and neighbouring MLA Bill Bennett of the BC Liberals had an ongoing feud.

On local issues Macdonald kept McMahon's constituency office in Revelstoke and opened offices in Golden and Kimberley. His office produced a report, in early 2006, on health care services, based on public opinion and anecdotal user experiences, within his riding and delivered it to Interior Health. While the health authority criticized and rebutted the report, several municipalities and a regional district asked for a review of Interior Health's operations. Macdonald issued a second, similar report later that year. When the provincial government launched its own Conversation on Health, in late 2006, Macdonald advocated on behalf of health care professionals who felt they were being dissuaded from participating. He was part of the opposition to the development of the Jumbo Glacier Resort and opposed an application by Fairmont Hot Springs Resort to pave a road through Columbia Lake Provincial Park to access a proposed residential subdivision. Macdonald continually lobbied Minister of Environment Barry Penner to re-acquire a conservation officer for Golden, a position that had been eliminated. The BC Liberals had promised a new conservation officer in Golden during the election but did not fill the position until Spring 2009. After the legislature voted to increase the wages of MLAs, Macdonald donated that increase to community foundations and food banks in Golden, Kimberley and Invermere, and the Stephen Lewis Foundation.

One of the largest issues made public by Macdonald during this time frame was the fight to protect public power in British Columbia. Legislative changes made in 2006 by the BC Liberal government promoted the development of private power projects on formerly wild rivers and creeks.

Columbia River – Revelstoke was particularly impacted by these changes with more than 20 projects proposed within the constituency borders. The power projects which were touted as providing 'green power' were seen to be destructive to the environment and were being approved without consent of local governments.

Macdonald joined with the Golden Chapter of the Council of Canadians, local environmental groups and the Western Canada Wilderness Committee in hosting a series of Rivers at Risk rallies in Revelstoke, Golden, Invermere and Kimberley, where the response was very strong.

The community of Golden was particularly concerned about a proposed project on the Blaeberry River at Thompson Falls. On May 26, 2008, Macdonald presented a petition signed by 1000 Golden and Area residents stating their opposition to a power project at Thompson Falls.

The largest proposed private power project in the area was Glacier/Howser which was heavily opposed by Columbia Valley residents which resulted in even larger protest events being organized in Invermere. Former BC Social Credit Environment Minister and radio personality Rafe Mair, an outspoken opponent of the BC Liberal Energy Plan, spoke to a standing room-only crowd on June 11, 2008 where he said the government was "giving away our power to private interests, we will be handing over a great many of our rivers and creeks, which once underway, will be impossible to stop".

Rafe Mair also appeared with Macdonald in Cranbrook at a Rivers at Risk event on June 12, 2008 where Mair warned that the BC Liberal Energy Plan could result in the bankruptcy of BC Hydro. Macdonald and Mair also dropped in to Selkirk Secondary School in Kimberley to meet with students to discuss environmental and social issues.

Macdonald asked the Minister of Energy and the Minister of Environment to come to the communities of Revelstoke, Golden, Invermere and Kimberley and hold public meetings to answer the people's concerns about private power. While visiting Golden on another file, the Minister of Environment was met by a large group of protestors who wanted local rivers and creeks protected from private power developments.

As part of the 2009 election campaign, the New Democrats promised a moratorium on private power projects until a full review could be made to ensure that projects made environmental and economic sense and that the cumulative impacts of all projects was fully understood. In many communities in the constituency, private power was a ballot box issue; Macdonald won 55.29% of the vote.

=== 39th Parliament ===
As the 2009 provincial election approached, Macdonald was acclaimed as the NDP candidate and Revelstoke mayor Mark McKee won the BC Liberal nomination. BC Conservative leader Wilfred Hanni announced his intention to run in the riding but later switched to neighbouring Kootenay East. The Green Party added a late entrant, Sarah Svensson, a UBC doctoral student, but she did not campaign in the riding. It was expected to be a safe win for Macdonald, who attacked the BC Liberals over recent mill closures and forestry issues while the BC Liberals tried to prove Macdonald was "secretly endorsing" independent power producers while publicly calling for a moratorium on them. While Macdonald won the riding with over 50% of the vote, his BC NDP formed the official opposition to BC Liberals won re-election as majority government.

As the 39th Parliament began, caucus members elected Macdonald as Caucus Chair and party leader Carole James reassigned Macdonald to be the critic for Forests and Range and Integrated Land Management, with Bill Routley as his deputy critic. Together the critic team toured Vancouver Island investigating the issues of the island's forestry industry and successfully made amendments to the government's proposed Woodworkers Lien Act. Macdonald joined local opponents and the Western Canada Wilderness Committee who sought to block logging operations in the Mount Arrowsmith UNESCO biosphere reserve near Nanoose Bay. Locally, Macdonald closed his Revelstoke office and opted to hold public meetings in various communities throughout the year. He worked with the Ministry of Environment on addressing an urban deer herd in Kimberley. He continued his feud with Bennett, this time over the proposed Jumbo Resort and the introduction of the Harmonized Sales Tax, both of which Macdonald opposed but Bennett advocated for. Macdonald openly advocated on behalf of workers at the British Columbia Ambulance Service who were on strike and he put his support behind a proposal to include the David Thompson Heritage Lands, the Columbia River, as a National Historic Site.

In October 2010, Macdonald abruptly resigned as the NDP caucus chairman. He explained that the resignation was in reaction to the party leader's removal of Bob Simpson, who had publicly criticized James, from the NDP caucus without consulting the caucus beforehand. As more MLAs came out against James' leadership, Macdonald backed Jenny Kwan's request that James call a leadership convention. While James initially rejected the request, James did resign in December. During the subsequent leadership election, Macdonald endorsed Mike Farnworth calling him "competent, ethical (and) responsive to the issues that the people feel are important". Adrian Dix eventually won the leadership vote but Dix kept Macdonald as the party's forestry and lands critic.

In January 2011, Macdonald published an opinion piece in which he advocated for three specific democratic reforms: adopting a mixed-member proportional representation voting system, strengthening the role of the legislative committee system, and strengthening oversight offices like the Auditor General and the Children's Representative.

=== 40th Parliament ===
Macdonald again sought reelection in the 2013 provincial election. He was challenged by BC Liberal Doug Clovechok, Earl Olsen of Fairmont Hot Springs for the BC Conservatives and Laurel Ralston of Kimberle for the BC Green Party, though Macdonald was favoured to win. The result ended up closer than expected and though Macdonald won the Columbia River-Revelstoke seat, his NDP again formed the official opposition to a BC Liberal majority government in the 40th Parliament. After NDP leader Dix resigned, Macdonald again endorsed Farnworth as a suitable replacement, though John Horgan would go on to win the 2014 British Columbia New Democratic Party leadership election. In 2014 Macdonald introduced a private member bill, the British Columbia Open Mining Act, 2014 (Bill M-214), that would amend the Mines Act to create a Public Electronic Registry that would make all mine-related application, licence, permit, and inspection report to be publicly visible. In May 2016, Macdonald announced that he would not seek re-election in the upcoming 2017 provincial election. In that election, Clovechok won his former seat for the BC Liberals, though the NDP would go on to form the government in the 41st Parliament.

== Electoral history ==
2013 British Columbia general election: Columbia River-Revelstoke
Party	Candidate	Votes	%
New Democratic	Norm Macdonald	6,463	48.26
Liberal	Doug Clovechok	4,847	36.19
Conservative	Earl Olsen	1,162	8.68
Green	Laurel Ralston	921	6.88
Total valid votes		13,393	100.00
Total rejected ballots		45	0.33
Turnout		13,438	53.60
Source: Elections BC

B.C. General Election 2009: Columbia River-Revelstoke
Party	Candidate	Votes	%	±	Expenditures
NDP	Norm Macdonald	7,419	55		$39,287
Liberal	Mark McKee	5,093	38		$120,550
Green	Sarah Svensson	907	7	–	$350
Total Valid Votes		13,419	100		
Total Rejected Ballots		101	0.7		
Turnout		13,520	56		

B.C. General Election 2005 Columbia River-Revelstoke
Party	Candidate	Votes	%	±	Expenditures
NDP	Norm Macdonald	7,460	52		$38,430
Liberal	Wendy McMahon	5,750	40		$93,950
Green	Andy Shadrack	1,217	8	–	$168
Total Valid Votes		14,427	100		
Total Rejected Ballots		104	0.7		
Turnout		14,531	62		
