= Graeme Bowbrick =

Canadian lawyer, educator and politician

Graeme T. Bowbrick KC
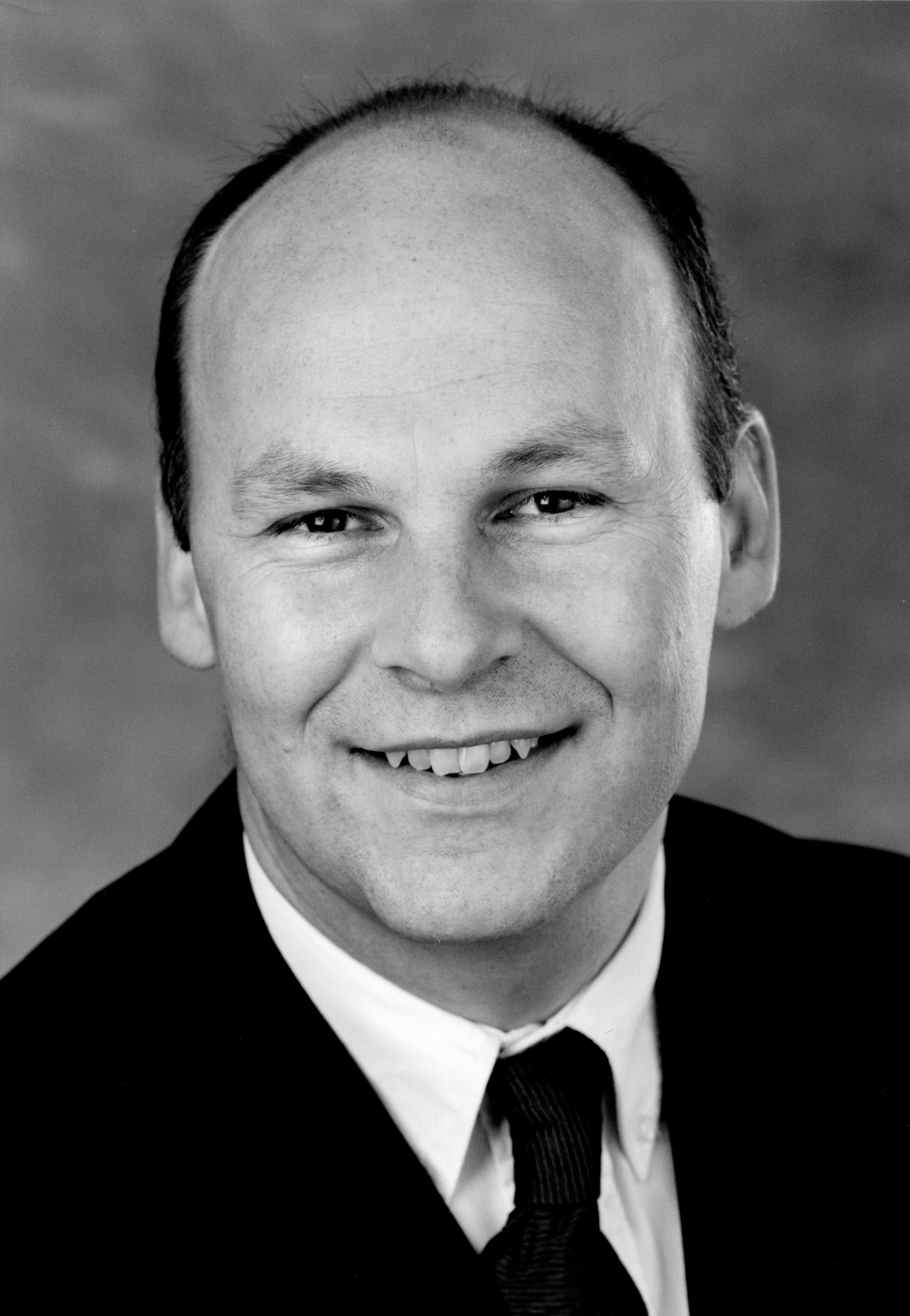

Member of the British Columbia Legislative Assembly for New Westminster
- In office May 28, 1996 – May 16, 2001
- Preceded by: Anita Hagen
- Succeeded by: Joyce Murray

Personal details
- Born: 1965 or 1966 (age 60–61)
- Party: New Democrat
- Education: Simon Fraser University; University of Victoria Faculty of Law; Peter A. Allard School of Law
- Profession: Lawyer; Educator

Graeme Bowbrick KC is a Canadian lawyer, educator and former politician. A faculty member in the criminology department at Simon Fraser University, he previously represented the riding of New Westminster in the Legislative Assembly of British Columbia from 1996 to 2001. As part of the British Columbia New Democratic Party (BC NDP) caucus, he served as Minister of Advanced Education, Training and Technology as well as Minister responsible for Youth in 2000, and as Attorney General and Minister responsible for Human Rights from 2000 to 2001.

== Biography ==
Bowbrick studied history and political science at Simon Fraser University, from which he received a Bachelor of Arts. He then graduated from the University of Victoria with an LL.B., and was called to the Bar on May 14, 1993. Prior to becoming a member of the Legislative Assembly (MLA), he worked at the Westminster Community Legal Services Society. He received an LL.M. from the University of British Columbia in 2013.

He first ran for office in the 1993 federal election, contesting the riding of North Vancouver as a New Democratic Party candidate and finishing fourth. In the 1996 provincial election, he won the seat of New Westminster in the legislature as a BC NDP candidate, succeeding outgoing MLA Anita Hagen. He served as parliamentary secretary to Premier Glen Clark until resigning in July 1999.

After Ujjal Dosanjh took over as premier in February 2000, Bowbrick was named to the cabinet as Minister of Advanced Education, Training and Technology, and Minister responsible for Youth. He then assumed the roles of Attorney General and Minister responsible for Human Rights in November that year from Andrew Petter, who was dropped from the cabinet for declining to run in the 2001 provincial election. With the NDP trailing in the polls, Bowbrick lost his seat in that election to Liberal candidate Joyce Murray. It was the first time since the 1949 provincial election that a non-NDP/CCF member had been elected in the New Westminster riding.

Bowbrick subsequently joined the Criminology and Legal Studies programs at Douglas College as an instructor. He also serves as chair of the college's Education Council and ex-officio member of the College Board as of 2023; he previously served as the board's faculty member. He is also an adjunct professor at Simon Fraser University, teaching in the Criminology program.

== Electoral history ==
37th British Columbia election, 2001
Party	Candidate	Votes	%	±	Expenditures
Liberal	Joyce Murray	11,059	49.20%		$47,701
New Democratic	Graeme Bowbrick	6,971	31.02%		$26,704
Green	Robert Broughton	2,982	13.27%		$3,401
Marijuana	Marlene P. Campbell	859	3.82%		$394
Unity	Howard Vernon Irving	604	2.69%		
Total Valid Votes		22,475	100.00%		
Total Rejected Ballots		113	0.50%		
Turnout		22,588	71.07%		

36th British Columbia election, 1996
Party	Candidate	Votes	%	±	Expenditures
New Democratic	Graeme Bowbrick	10,418	46.69%		$29,591
Liberal	Helen Sparkes	8,591	38.50%		$34,673
Reform	Brian Stromgren	1,446	6.48%		
Progressive Democrat	Craig Sahlin	1,121	5.02%		
Green	Michael G. Horn	488	2.19%		$145
Independent	Arthur Crossman	142	0.64%		
Natural Law	George Bauch	107	0.48%		$224
Total Valid Votes		22,313	100.00%		
Total Rejected Ballots		133	0.59%		
Turnout		22,446	70.41%		

1993 Canadian federal election: North Vancouver
Party	Candidate	Votes	%	±%
Reform	Ted White	20,213	39.97	+31.05
Liberal	Mobina Jaffer	15,934	31.51	+4.30
Progressive Conservative	Will McMartin	7,765	15.35	–22.29
New Democratic	Graeme Bowbrick	3,220	6.37	–17.49
National	Dallas Collis	2,220	4.39	–
Green	Arne B. Hansen	493	0.97	+0.04
Natural Law	Bradford Cooke	448	0.89	–
Independent	Clarke L. Ashley	147	0.29	–
Libertarian	Anthony Jasich	113	0.22	–0.23
Commonwealth of Canada	Paul G. Fraleigh	21	0.04	–
Total valid votes		50,574	99.59	
Total rejected ballots		209	0.41	+0.08
Turnout		50,783	72.46	–8.31
Eligible voters		70,082		
Reform gain from Progressive Conservative		Swing		+26.67
Source: Elections Canada

British Columbia provincial government of Ujjal Dosanjh
Cabinet posts (4)
Predecessor	Office	Successor
Andrew Petter	Attorney General of British Columbia; November 1, 2000–June 5, 2001	Geoff Plant
Andrew Petter	Minister responsible for Human Rights; November 1, 2000–June 5, 2001	Ministry Abolished
Andrew Petter	Minister responsible for Youth; February 29, 2000–November 1, 2000	Cathy McGregor
Andrew Petter	Minister of Advanced Education, Training and Technology; February 29, 2000–November 1, 2000	Cathy McGregor
