= Scott McInnis (Canadian politician) =

Canadian politician

The Honourable Scott McInnis MLA

Member of the British Columbia Legislative Assembly for Columbia River-Revelstoke
- Incumbent
- Assumed office October 19, 2024
- Preceded by: Doug Clovechok

Minister of Indigenous Relations and Reconciliation
- Incumbent
- Assumed office November 20, 2026
- Preceded by: Spencer Chandra Herbert

Personal details
- Party: BC Conservative (2024–2026, 2026–present)
- Other political affiliations: BC United (before 2024); Independent (2026)

Scott McInnis MLA is a Canadian politician who has served as a member of the Legislative Assembly of British Columbia (MLA) representing the electoral district of Columbia River-Revelstoke since 2024. Elected as a member of the Conservative Party, he briefly sat as an independent for 19 days in September 2026.

== Early life and career ==
In 2010, he moved to Kimberley, British Columbia from a small farming community in Ontario.

McInnis is an educator and community leader. Before his election, he worked as a teacher and principal for Pre-K to Grade 12, and has worked in both public and independent school systems. His 15 year career in education included local and provincial advocacy for education and child care. McInnis' participation in the 2022 Teacher Institute for Parliamentary Democracy in Victoria - he marks this as the beginning of his journey into politics.

McInnis has coached basketball for many years, bringing his teams to multiple East Kootenay Zone Championships. He is also an active volunteer in the Elks Lodge #90 in Kimberley.

== Political career ==
McInnis was previously the BC United candidate for the Columbia River-Revelstoke riding before switching to the Conservative Party after the former suspended its campaign to support the latter.

In the 2024 provincial election, McInnis was elected as a Member of the Legislative Assembly for Columbia River-Revelstoke, representing the Conservative Party of British Columbia. After his election, McInnis was named to the Conservative shadow cabinet as critic for Indigenous Relations and Reconciliation.

On September 2, 2026, McInnis left the Conservative Party to sit as an independent, the ninth MLA to depart the party since mid-August. After Conservative leader Kerry-Lynne Findlay resigned and was replaced on an interim basis by Lorne Doerkson, McInnis returned to the Conservative caucus.

== Electoral history ==
2024 British Columbia general election: Columbia River-Revelstoke
Party	Candidate	Votes	%	±%	Expenditures
Conservative	Scott McInnis	8,768	47.92	–	$21,002.23
New Democratic	Andrea Dunlop	8,098	44.26	+6.6	$24,417.66
Green	Calvin Beauchesne	1,430	7.82	−5.1	$2,997.00
Total valid votes/expense limit		18,296	99.78	–	$71,700.08
Total rejected ballots		41	0.22	–	
Turnout		18,337	58.46	–	
Registered voters		31,366			
Conservative notional gain from BC United		Swing		N/A (Note: Swing cannot be calculated as BC United did not run a candidate in this riding.)	
Source: Elections BC

== See also ==
- 43rd Parliament of British Columbia
