= Rae Eddie =

Canadian politician

MLA for New Westminster
- In office 1952–1969
- Preceded by: Byron Johnson
- Succeeded by: Dennis Cocke

Personal details
- Born: John McRae Eddie; August 23, 1900 Ekfrid, Ontario, Canada
- Died: February 6, 1977 (aged 76) New Westminster, British Columbia, Canada
- Party: Co-operative Commonwealth Federation → New Democrat

John McRae (Rae) Eddie (August 23, 1900 – February 6, 1977) was a Canadian politician, who served as a Member of the Legislative Assembly of British Columbia from 1952 to 1969, representing the riding of New Westminster. He was a member of the Co-operative Commonwealth Federation, which became the New Democratic Party.

He was born in Ontario, of Scottish descent, and was educated in Saskatchewan. Eddie later moved to British Columbia, where he married Norma Sutherland. He worked in the lumber industry. Eddie defeated then premier Byron Ingemar Johnson to win a seat in the provincial assembly in 1952. He died in New Westminster at the age of 76.
