= Dennis Cocke =

Canadian politician (1924–2008)

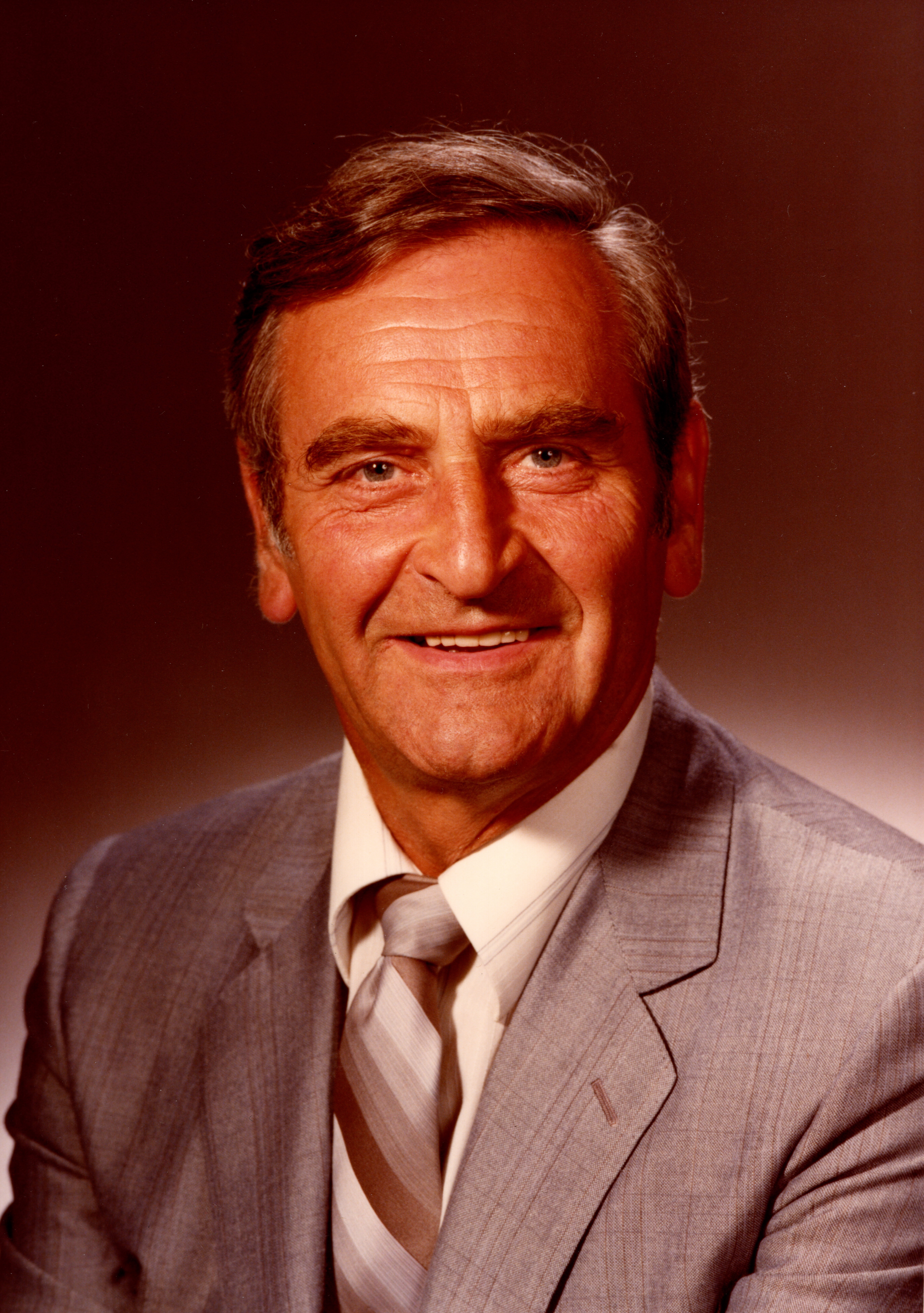

Member of the British Columbia Legislative Assembly for New Westminster
- In office August 27, 1969 – October 22, 1986
- Preceded by: Rae Eddie
- Succeeded by: Anita Hagen

Personal details
- Born: June 2, 1924 Athabasca, Alberta
- Died: July 2, 2008 (aged 84) New Westminster, British Columbia
- Party: New Democrat

Dennis Geoffrey Cocke (June 2, 1924 – July 2, 2008) sat as a Member of the British Columbia Legislature as a New Democratic Party member from 1969 to 1986 for the seat of New Westminster.

He grew up on a farm in Athabasca, Alberta and served in the Royal Canadian Air Force during World War II.

Cocke served as Minister of Health (initially named Minister of Health Services and Hospital Insurance) under Dave Barrett from 1972 to 1975. In that capacity he created the BC Ambulance Service, replacing a patchwork of private and municipal enterprise with a province-wide system, professional standards and certification, and with newly designed and purpose-built ambulance vehicles. He also led the building of Queen's Park Hospital, and the reconstruction of Royal Columbian Hospital.

He died at the age of 84 at the Royal Columbian Hospital after suffering a stroke.
