= Joyce Murray =

Canadian politician

The Honourable Joyce Murray PC
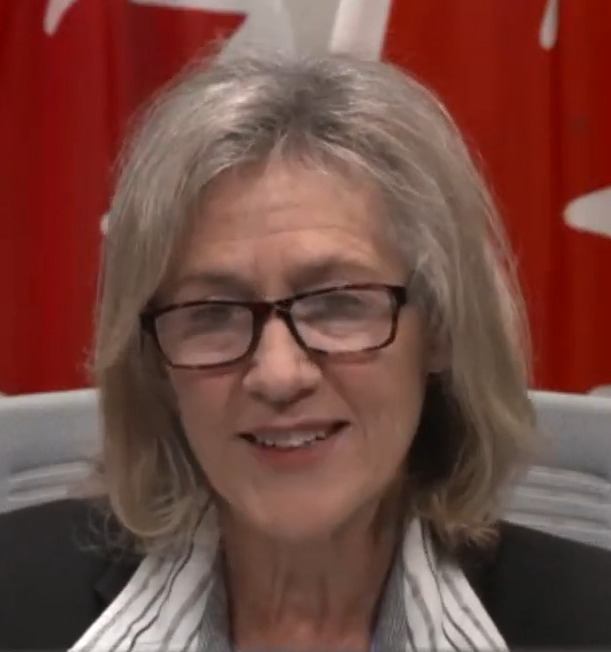
- Murray in 2020

Minister of Fisheries, Oceans and the Canadian Coast Guard
- In office October 26, 2021 – July 26, 2023
- Prime Minister: Justin Trudeau
- Preceded by: Bernadette Jordan
- Succeeded by: Diane Lebouthillier

Minister of Digital Government
- In office March 18, 2019 – October 26, 2021
- Prime Minister: Justin Trudeau
- Preceded by: Position created
- Succeeded by: Position abolished

President of the Treasury Board
- In office March 18, 2019 – November 20, 2019
- Prime Minister: Justin Trudeau
- Preceded by: Jane Philpott; Carla Qualtrough (acting)
- Succeeded by: Jean-Yves Duclos

Member of Parliament for Vancouver Quadra
- In office March 17, 2008 – April 28, 2025
- Preceded by: Stephen Owen
- Succeeded by: Wade Grant

Member of the Legislative Assembly of British Columbia for New Westminster
- In office May 16, 2001 – May 17, 2005
- Preceded by: Graeme Bowbrick
- Succeeded by: Chuck Puchmayr

Personal details
- Born: Joyce Catherine Murray; July 11, 1954 (age 72) Schweizer-Reneke, South Africa
- Party: Liberal
- Other political affiliations: BC Liberals
- Spouse: Dirk Brinkman
- Children: Baba Brinkman (son)
- Education: Simon Fraser University (BA & MBA)
- Occupation: Politician

Joyce Catherine Murray PC (born July 11, 1954) is a Canadian politician who represented the riding of Vancouver Quadra in the House of Commons as a member of the Liberal Party from 2008 until 2025. She was re-elected in the 41st, 42nd, 43rd, and 44th federal elections. Murray was appointed as President of the Treasury Board and Minister of Digital Government on March 18, 2019. She was re-appointed as Minister of Digital Government following the 2019 election. In 2021, she was appointed Minister of Fisheries, Oceans and the Canadian Coast Guard, a position she held until July 2023.

Murray previously served as a cabinet minister in the Legislative Assembly of British Columbia, first as Minister of Water, Land, and Air Protection from 2001 to 2004 and then as Minister of Management Services until 2005. From 2003 to 2004, she presided over the Canadian Council of Ministers of the Environment. On April 14, 2013, Murray placed second in the Liberal Party of Canada leadership election. In December 2015, she was appointed as Parliamentary Secretary to the President of the Treasury Board.

She announced on July 25, 2023, that she would not be seeking re-election.

== Background ==
Murray was born in Schweizer-Reneke, South Africa, and immigrated to Canada with her parents in 1961. Murray and her parents settled in Vancouver, in the West Point Grey neighbourhood. Murray's mother, Charlotte Coe Murray, was an architect who became the first female assistant professor at the University of British Columbia School of Architecture. Murray's father, Gordon Murray, a businessman, founded Murray & Associates Surveying.

After graduating from Lord Byng Secondary School, Murray attended Simon Fraser University in the 1970s, studied archaeology and linguistics, and then completed her pre-med requirements. In 1989, she pursued an executive master's degree in Business Administration at SFU's Beedie School of Business. In 1992 in recognition of her academic achievements, she received the Beedie School of Business's "Dean's Convocation Medal" for the being the school's top MBA graduate of that year. Her thesis was a policy analysis of one of Canada's options for meeting the challenge of climate change.

== Business career ==
Murray and a group of friends won one of the first tree-planting contracts in British Columbia in 1970, starting what would become Brinkman and Associates Reforestation. Starting as a small tree-planting proprietorship in British Columbia, the business began to expand when Murray and Brinkman started working together in 1975. Murray and her husband, Dirk Brinkman, incorporated Brinkman and Associates Reforestation Ltd. in 1979. The company grew and planted its billionth tree by 2012.

In 1976, Nick Kendall of Orca Productions documented the planting of millions of trees in the heavy slash debris of that era's logging in a one-hour NFB documentary Do it with Joy. Released in 1977, it is regarded as a tree-planting classic today.

Murray and Brinkman grew the company across Canada (1978 Alberta; 1983 Ontario, 1987 Saskatchewan 1989 Quebec, 1992 Manitoba, 1993 Yukon) and diversified beyond reforestation into ecosystem restoration, urban restoration, forest management services for First Nation communities, rights of way clearing and fully integrated harvest to reforestation services and sustainability initiatives. In 1994, the company's long-term strategic international division, BARCA, was formed to develop forestry initiatives and plantations in Central America. In 2007, Brinkman co-founded Earth Partners LP, which is undertaking the largest private soil and ecosystem restoration projects in the United States. The company operates in six countries and is developing projects in several others. It employs approximately 600 full-time and 800 seasonal positions. Murray helped in developing management systems, organizational re-engineering, strategic development, restructuring, training and business planning. For a period beginning in 1979, she was the chair of the board of directors and from this role proposed a global warming strategy for Canada.

== Provincial politics ==
From 1996 to 1999, Murray sat on the BC Forest Resources Advisory Board and the GVRD Waste Management Committee. As a result of her public interventions, the leader of the BC Liberals attempted to persuade her to run for nomination as a BC Liberal candidate, but she challenged him to lead more strongly on sustainability commitments. When she declared herself a candidate in May 2000, the headline "From the Greens to the Liberals" ran over an article that opens with predictions Murray had made in 1997 about forest renewal, her background and her wish "to create a sustainable community".

In August 2000, Murray won the nomination as the BC Liberal candidate for the riding of the electoral district of New Westminster. During the election, she developed climate action and forest renewal policy papers for the party leadership. Then in 2001, she switched from business to politics full-time when she became the first BC Liberal (and first non–New Democrat) to be elected from New Westminster since the 1949 provincial election. She was named a cabinet minister by Premier Gordon Campbell in June 2001, serving until 2004 as the first-ever minister of Water, Land and Air Protection, and as Minister of Management Services from 2004 until the 2005 election. In 2002, Murray hosted a joint meeting of the federal, provincial and territorial energy and environment ministers, to examine policies in the context of ratification of the Kyoto Protocol.

Murray's tenure as Minister of Water, Land and Air Protection focused on protecting ecological sites in the province. For example, Murray worked towards developing an agreement with the Heiltsuk First Nation and brought about co-management of the protected Hakai Luxvbalis Conservancy Area. Spruce Lake Protected Area was named a provincial park, and Burns Bog, the largest domed peat bog on the west coast, was purchased by the province and other local public entities and became the Burns Bog Ecological Conservancy Area. She also presided over budget cuts in the department and rollbacks of environmental regulations. "Murray lifted the moratorium on hunting grizzly bears, oversaw huge cutbacks in staffing levels for environmental protection, and gutted the Waste Management Act in favour of legislation that eliminated up to 80 percent of permitting." The chair of the Sierra Club's BC chapter stated in 2003: "I have never seen such an assault on the environment". However, the Sierra Club later awarded Murray with a medal for her environmental work.

Murray also introduced the first comprehensive framework strategy for total product stewardship for recycling of all products in British Columbia. The new regulations required that producers assume responsibility for removing their products from the waste stream. She also brought together the province's 13 oil producers to develop a cooperative solution for recycling waste oil, plastic (from containers), and steel wool from oil filters. At that time, over 22 million litres of oil were entering the GVRD waste stream annually. Murray then brought the electronics industry under the product stewardship framework to develop solutions for all electronic waste and worked with the pulp and paper industry to help them implement their stewardship strategy. Murray's work has since served as the basis for similar legislation in several other provinces.

From 2003 to 2004, Murray was the president of the Canadian Council of Ministers of the Environment.

As Minister of Management Services in 2004, Murray participated in the moves to the first-ever cross-Canada interprovincial procurement program and the first legislation that would limit personal information access via foreign corporations working in Canada.

She was defeated by Chuck Puchmayr in the 2005 provincial election before moving on to federal politics.

== Federal politician ==
In the 2006 federal election, Murray was the Liberal Party candidate in the riding of New Westminster—Coquitlam, placing third behind New Democrat Dawn Black and Conservative incumbent Paul Forseth. But in 2007, she became the Liberal candidate in her home riding of Vancouver Quadra, as Stephen Owen, the incumbent Liberal MP in the riding, had resigned in July 2007. In a March 2008 by-election, Murray defeated her main competitor, Conservative candidate Deborah Meredith. Murray was re-elected in 2008 and 2011.

Murray was the third-party critic for Small Business and Tourism, the Asia Pacific Gateway, and Western Economic Diversification for the Liberal Party's shadow cabinet, having previously served as the Liberal critic for Amateur Sport, leading up to the 2010 Winter Olympics in Vancouver, and as the critic for Democratic Reform in 2008.

During her first term in the House of Commons, she sat on the House's Standing Committee on International Trade and was vice-chair of the Liberal Caucus Committee on Environmental Sustainability. Murray also visited Colombia and Panama to review proposed free trade agreements. She attended the climate negotiations at the Bali Conference in 2007 and the Copenhagen Summit in 2009. After the latter, Murray wrote, while applauding the positive actions of Canada's municipal governments, "a patchwork of climate initiatives is far from effective – a coordinated approach across this vast and diverse country is required".

After her first term, Murray's committee experience included membership on the Standing Committees on Environmental and Sustainable Development, Fisheries and Oceans, and serving as vice-chair of the Parliamentary Committee on Health. She was also an active member of the Canada-China Legislative Association, chaired Parliament's All-Party Conservation Caucus, and was the vice-chair of the Liberal Policy Caucus. In March 2012, Murray visited Haiti as a member of a delegation representing the Canadian section of ParlAmericas.

In June 2008, she presented her first private member's bill, Bill C-572, which proposed exempting bicycles (including electric bikes), bike accessories, repairs, and safety training from the GST.

In June 2014, Murray introduced Bill C-622, the CSEC Accountability and Transparency Act. This legislation would have updated the framework for accountability and transparency for CSEC, partially in response to concerns over the use of metadata. It also would have established a committee of security-cleared parliamentarians, to oversee all of Canada's security and intelligence agencies. The next Liberal government would later introduce many of these provisions, including a new National Security and Intelligence Committee of Parliamentarians, with Bill C-22 and Bill C-59.

In December 2010, Murray introduced Bill C-606, an act to amend the Canada Shipping Act, which proposed to ban oil tanker traffic on Canada's Pacific North Coast. The bill passed its first reading in the House of Commons and was scheduled for a second reading when an election was called in March 2011. In the next session, she reintroduced the bill as Bill C-437. In 2017, the Liberal government introduced a similar law, Bill C-48.

Murray is opposed to all pipelines that would ship Alberta oil and bitumen to the British Columbia coast, calling them a "stone age" approach to energy development. Murray has called for more oil to be refined and upgraded in Canada and for an end to "oilsands industry subsidies, and opposition to pipeline proposals to carry bitumen to a BC port".

In June 2012, Murray hosted Adam Scorgie and Brett Harvey in Ottawa to screen their documentary The Union: The Business Behind Getting High for parliamentarians. Supporting the legalization of marijuana would be part of Murray's leadership election platform later that year.

=== Leadership ===
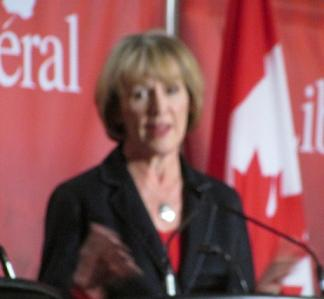
Murray during a candidates' debate on February 16, 2013, in Mississauga

Murray confirmed in September 2012 that she was exploring the idea of running for the leadership of the Liberal Party of Canada. On November 26, 2012, she announced that she was entering the leadership race, as the only candidate based in western Canada, although former Toronto MP Martha Hall Findlay's campaign was being run from Calgary.

Murray described her leadership platform to a "capacity crowd" in her riding on December 1. Murray announced that she supported appointing a minimum of 40 percent of women to the cabinet and government boards, commissions, and agencies. She also supported putting a price on carbon, legalizing marijuana, and wanted Liberals to work cooperatively with the New Democratic Party (NDP) and the Green Party in the next federal election if this is the desire of riding associations. Murray was the only candidate in the leadership race who supported cooperating with other parties before the election. More than half of Liberals (53%), NDP supporters (55%) and Green Party supporters (57%) polled on February 6, 2013, were supportive of running a single candidate against the Conservatives in each riding. The NDP was officially opposed to the idea, although their house leader, Nathan Cullen, had suggested the concept before when he gained support from Greens, according to Green Party leader Elizabeth May. May praised Murray "for charting a difficult course, displaying political courage and integrity". On February 15, the eve of the third debate, Murray's position had come to the attention of online groups seeking electoral cooperation. Murray was also the only Liberal leadership candidate to speak out strongly in favour of electing the House of Commons with a system of proportional representation. She challenged Trudeau on the issue, especially over his assertion that voters wanted proportional representation because they did not understand the consequences of adopting it. David Suzuki endorsed Murray's Climate Change position on February 15.

On March 13, Marc Garneau, who was considered to be in second place, dropped out of the leadership race. An internal poll released by Garneau showed that Murray was in third place behind Justin Trudeau and Garneau, with 7.4 percent support among potential voters, and she had taken the role of "challenger". It was later admitted that the poll did not comply with federal caller identification rules. On March 23, Elizabeth May announced the Green party would not run a candidate in the Labrador by-election and Murray announced that cooperation on the matter had been discussed with May. The topic was discussed in the 5th debate. The NDP nominated a candidate although May asked them not to. On March 26, Murray claimed to have the greatest number of registered supporters. Similar numbers of supporters and members of the party may have registered to vote.

In the fourth quarter of 2012, Murray raised $56,554.06 in campaign donations. Out of the seven candidates who were registered at this time, she placed fifth in the amount of money raised. A March 2013, report showed Murray in third place having raised $169,000. A later March report put Murray in second place having raised $198,000.

With each of the 308 ridings across the country assigned equal weight, Murray finished in second place with 10.16 percent, ahead of Martha Hall Findlay's 5.71 percent and behind winner Justin Trudeau's 80.09 percent points. Trudeau had lost only 5 ridings, all to Murray and all in BC.

=== Federal politics after the leadership race ===
Murray was appointed the Liberal critic for both National Defence and Western Diversification and became chair of the Party's Northern and Western Caucus. Murray spoke out on matters from defence procurement and safety to electoral reform. In her defence role, Murray co-authored a published opinion "Who's watching our spies?" when a security scandal arose after Parliament was prorogued on September 16, 2013.

Prorogation does not require private members' bills to be reintroduced, hence Murray's bill, C-437, from the first session of the 41st Canadian Parliament, remained in place as the second session opened on October 16, 2013. Before the opening, Liberal Party expenses, including Murray's, had been posted.

In 2013, Murray published two articles on national defence, "Canada's Navy is a Sinking Ship" and "My Wish List for National Defence in 2014", published on November 27 and December 20, respectively. The first draws from the comments made in the Auditor General's report covering the National Shipbuilding Procurement Strategy.

On March 2, 2014, Murray was introduced to Vancouver Quadra supporters as their acclaimed candidate and the first Liberal to be selected in British Columbia to run in the 42nd Canadian federal election scheduled for October 19, 2015.

On June 18, 2014, Murray tabled for first reading, Private Member's Bill C-622, "An Act to amend the National Defence Act (transparency and accountability), to enact the Intelligence and Security Committee of Parliament Act and to make consequential amendments to other Acts". Murray noted during the second reading on October 30, 2014, that "the prior commissioners of CSEC and prior chiefs of CSEC or CSE have called for this very committee themselves". On November 5 after further discussion, with members aware that Australia, New Zealand, the U.S and the U.K. had civilian security oversight committees, Bill C-622 was defeated by 142 votes to 120.

On December 12, 2014, it was reported that ministers had written that Foreign Affairs and Defence representatives would provide an update on Canada's mission in Iraq to an existing committee in response to a letter from Murray and Marc Garneau.

On April 14, 2015, an opinion piece by Murray was published on the response to an oil spill in English Bay. The next month, on May 5, Murray represented the Liberal Party in the House of Commons in favour of Bill C-51. While she suggested there was some positive feedback, the evidence showed that the majority of Canadians opposed this bill. On September 16 of that year, GreenPAC, an NGO dedicated to action to protect the environment, announced that an expert panel had placed Murray amongst the eighteen greenest candidates in the 2015 election.

On September 18, 2015, Craig Forcese and Kent Roach detailed Murray's Bill 622, noting it was "impressive and wide-ranging", saying "Joyce Murray's private members bill proposed an interesting attempt to prevent partisan and government domination of a new committee by providing that no political party should have a majority of committee members. This is a worthy idea." On October 1, it was reported Forcese and Roach had "applauded Murray's legislative attempt to deal with the shortcomings of Bill C-51".

=== In government ===
On October 19, 2015, Murray was re-elected to represent Vancouver Quadra in the 42nd Canadian federal election. On December 2, 2015, she was appointed Parliamentary Secretary to the President of the Treasury Board.

As parliamentary secretary, Murray worked with the Treasury Board to develop a framework for achieving greater GHG reductions across federal government operations. Through collaboration across multiple departments and with provincial and municipal levels of government, and through consultation with climate experts, the Centre for Greening Government was created within the Treasury Board Secretariat in November 2016. According to its webpage, "the Centre tracks and reports on the federal government's emissions centrally, coordinates greening efforts across government and drives results to ensure the Government of Canada meets its greenhouse gas reduction targets. The Centre aims to leverage knowledge, skills and capabilities that can be shared throughout the Government of Canada and among various communities of practice through partnerships with government and non-government organizations, including business and academia."

On June 22, 2017, Bill C-22 received Royal Assent, creating the National Security and Intelligence Committee of Parliamentarians. Both the scope and intent of Bill C-22 as well as much of its text were based on Murray's earlier private member's bill C-622.

In celebration of Canada 150, Murray created an award for Vancouver Quadra's Hidden Heroes, recognizing locals who had contributed to the community and country. The winners were recognized with certificates and special pins made from the old roof of the Canadian Parliament.

In September 2017, Murray was awarded the Canada Clean50 Award recognizing her commitment to fighting climate change and protecting the environment. Murray received the award in recognition of her work on the Centre for Greening Government, and her record of achievement on environmental issues both federally and provincially.

In February 2018, Murray travelled to the Digital Nations 2030 conference, held in New Zealand, on behalf of Treasury Board president Scott Brison. There, she signed the D7 charter, making Canada a member of the Digital 7, a group of national governments seeking to encourage faster and more efficient digital government.

On March 18, 2019, Murray was appointed President of the Treasury Board. She succeeded Jane Philpott, who had resigned earlier that month in reaction to the SNC-Lavalin affair.

In October 2021, she was appointed Minister of Fisheries, Oceans and the Canadian Coast Guard.

On July 25, 2023, days before an expected Cabinet shuffle, Murray announced she would not be running in the next election. She was succeeded as Fisheries Minister by Diane Lebouthillier the following day.

== Electoral record ==
=== Federal ===
2021 Canadian federal election: Vancouver Quadra
Party	Candidate	Votes	%	±%	Expenditures
Liberal	Joyce Murray	20,814	43.63	+0.10	$93,921.31
Conservative	Brad Armstrong	13,786	28.90	+1.15	$103,409.23
New Democratic	Naden Abenes	9,220	19.33	+4.19	$9,885.59
Green	Devyani Singh	2,922	6.13	–6.30	$18,663.20
People's	Renate Siekmann	963	2.02	+1.18	$20,173.89
Total valid votes/expense limit		47,705	99.39	–	$108,762.68
Total rejected ballots		291	0.61	+0.11	
Turnout		47,996	62.65	–4.49	
Eligible voters		76,613			
Liberal hold		Swing		–0.53	
Source: Elections Canada

2019 Canadian federal election: Vancouver Quadra
Party	Candidate	Votes	%	±%	Expenditures
Liberal	Joyce Murray	22,093	43.53	–15.18	$90,017.99
Conservative	Kathleen Dixon	14,082	27.75	+1.91	$104,509.91
New Democratic	Leigh Kenny	7,681	15.13	+4.28	$8,074.37
Green	Geoff Wright	6,308	12.43	+8.22	$9,668.18
People's	Sandra Filosof-Schipper	428	0.84	–	$1,463.92
Independent	Austen Erhardt	162	0.32	–	$769.45
Total valid votes/expense limit		50,754	99.51	–	$105,408.01
Total rejected ballots		251	0.49	+0.22	
Turnout		51,005	67.14	–2.71	
Eligible voters		75,967			
Liberal hold		Swing		–8.54	
Source: Elections Canada

2015 Canadian federal election: Vancouver Quadra
Party	Candidate	Votes	%	±%	Expenditures
Liberal	Joyce Murray	31,102	58.71	+15.25	$97,238.16
Conservative	Blair Lockhart	13,683	25.83	–10.60	$138,478.02
New Democratic	Scott Andrews	5,748	10.85	–3.60	$28,356.72
Green	Kris Constable	2,229	4.21	–1.44	$9,999.97
Pirate	Trevor Clinton Walper	86	0.16	–	$246.50
Marijuana	Marc Boyer	65	0.12	–	none listed
Independent	Jean-François Caron	59	0.11	–	$20.80
Total valid votes/expense limit		52,972	99.73	–	$207,109.54
Total rejected ballots		144	0.27	+0.01	
Turnout		53,116	69.85	+7.43	
Eligible voters		76,038			
Liberal hold		Swing		+12.92	
Source: Elections Canada

2011 Canadian federal election: Vancouver Quadra
Party	Candidate	Votes	%	±%
Liberal	Joyce Murray	22,903	42.17	-3.42
Conservative	Deborah Meredith	20,984	38.64	+1.73
New Democratic	Victor Elkins	7,499	13.81	+5.75
Green	Laura-Leah Shaw	2,922	5.38	-3.44
Total valid votes		54,308	100.0	
Total rejected ballots		144	0.26	-0.02
Turnout		54,452	63.17	-0.20
Eligible voters		86,203		
Liberal hold		Swing		-2.58

2008 Canadian federal election: Vancouver Quadra
Party	Candidate	Votes	%	±%	Expenditures
Liberal	Joyce Murray	25,393	45.59	+9.54	$79,097
Conservative	Deborah Meredith	20,561	36.91	+1.39	$83,516
Green	Dan Grice	4,916	8.82	-4.64	$6,621
New Democratic	David Caplan	4,493	8.06	-6.37	$19,537
Libertarian	Norris Barens	333	0.59	–	
Total valid votes/Expense limit		55,696	100.0		$89,046
Total rejected ballots		158	0.28	+0.01	
Turnout		55,854	63.37	+29	
Liberal hold		Swing		+4.08	

Canadian federal by-election, March 17, 2008: Vancouver Quadra By-election due to the resignation of Stephen Owen
Party	Candidate	Votes	%	±%	Expenditures
Liberal	Joyce Murray	10,155	36.05	–13.09	$71,893.89
Conservative	Deborah Meredith	10,004	35.52	+6.63	$86,019.40
New Democratic	Rebeccca Coad	4,064	14.43	–1.65	$58,965.05
Green	Dan Grice	3,792	13.46	+8.36	$36,542.40
Rhinoceros	John Turner	111	0.39	–	none listed
Canadian Action	Psamuel Frank	40	0.14	–	$63.65
Total valid votes/expense limit		28,166	99.73	–	$87,207.82
Total rejected ballots		77	0.27	+0.05	
Turnout		28,243	33.78	–33.77	
Eligible voters		83,602			
Liberal hold		Swing		–9.86	
Source: Elections Canada

2006 Canadian federal election: New Westminster—Coquitlam
Party	Candidate	Votes	%	±%	Expenditures
New Democratic	Dawn Black	19,427	38.32	+5.68	$73,164.63
Conservative	Paul Forseth	16,494	32.53	–0.34	$73,884.32
Liberal	Joyce Murray	11,931	23.53	–3.87	$68,804.72
Green	Sven Biggs	1,496	2.95	–2.67	$5.00
Independent	Paul Warnett	1,174	2.32	–	$9,543.11
Independent	Dick Estey	123	0.24	–	$117.60
Marxist–Leninist	Joseph Theriault	54	0.11	–	none listed
Total valid votes/expense limit		50,699	99.66	–	$78,964.80
Total rejected ballots		171	0.34	+0.06	
Turnout		50,870	65.29	+1.65	
Eligible voters		77,916			
New Democratic gain from Conservative		Swing		+3.01	
Source: Elections Canada

=== Provincial ===
2005 British Columbia general election: New Westminster
Party	Candidate	Votes	%	±%	Expenditures
New Democratic	Chuck Puchmayr	13,226	51.32	+20.30	$61,892
Liberal	Joyce Murray	9,645	37.42	−11.78	$135,015
Green	Robert Broughton	2,416	9.37	−3.90	$1,417
Marijuana	Christina Racki	293	1.14	−2.68	$100
Democratic Reform	John Robinson Warren	152	0.59	–	$410
Platinum	Greg Calcutta	42	0.16	–	$100
Total valid votes		25,774	100.00		
Total rejected ballots		166	0.64	+0.14	
Turnout		25,940	63.91	−6.5	
New Democratic gain from Liberal		Swing		+16.04	

2001 British Columbia general election: New Westminster
Party	Candidate	Votes	%	±%	Expenditures
Liberal	Joyce Murray	11,059	49.20	+10.70	$47,701
New Democratic	Graeme Bowbrick	6,971	31.02	-15.67	$26,704
Green	Robert Broughton	2,982	13.27	+11.08	$3,401
Marijuana	Marlene P. Campbell	859	3.82	–	$394
Unity	Howard Vernon Irving	604	2.69	–	
Total valid votes		22,475	100.00		
Total rejected ballots		113	0.50	+0.09	
Turnout		22,446	70.41	-0.66	
Liberal gain from New Democratic		Swing		+13.19	

British Columbia provincial government of Gordon Campbell
Cabinet posts (2)
Predecessor	Office	Successor
Sandy Santori	Minister of Management Services; January 26, 2004 – June 16, 2005	(Position abolished)
Ian Waddell	Minister of Water, Land and Air Protection; June 5, 2001 – January 26, 2004	Bill Barisoff
