= Wendy McMahon =

Canadian politician (born 1951)

Member of the British Columbia Legislative Assembly for Columbia River-Revelstoke
- In office May 16, 2001 – May 17, 2005
- Preceded by: Jim Doyle
- Succeeded by: Norm Macdonald

Personal details
- Born: 1951 (age 74–75) Edmonton, Alberta
- Party: Liberal

Wendy McMahon (born 1951 in Edmonton, Alberta) is a former Canadian politician, who was a BC Liberal Member of the Legislative Assembly of British Columbia from 2001 until her defeat in 2005. She represented the riding of Columbia River-Revelstoke. She served as Minister of State for Women's and Seniors' Services between December 15, 2004 and June 16, 2005.
