= Jim Doyle (Canadian politician) =

Canadian politician

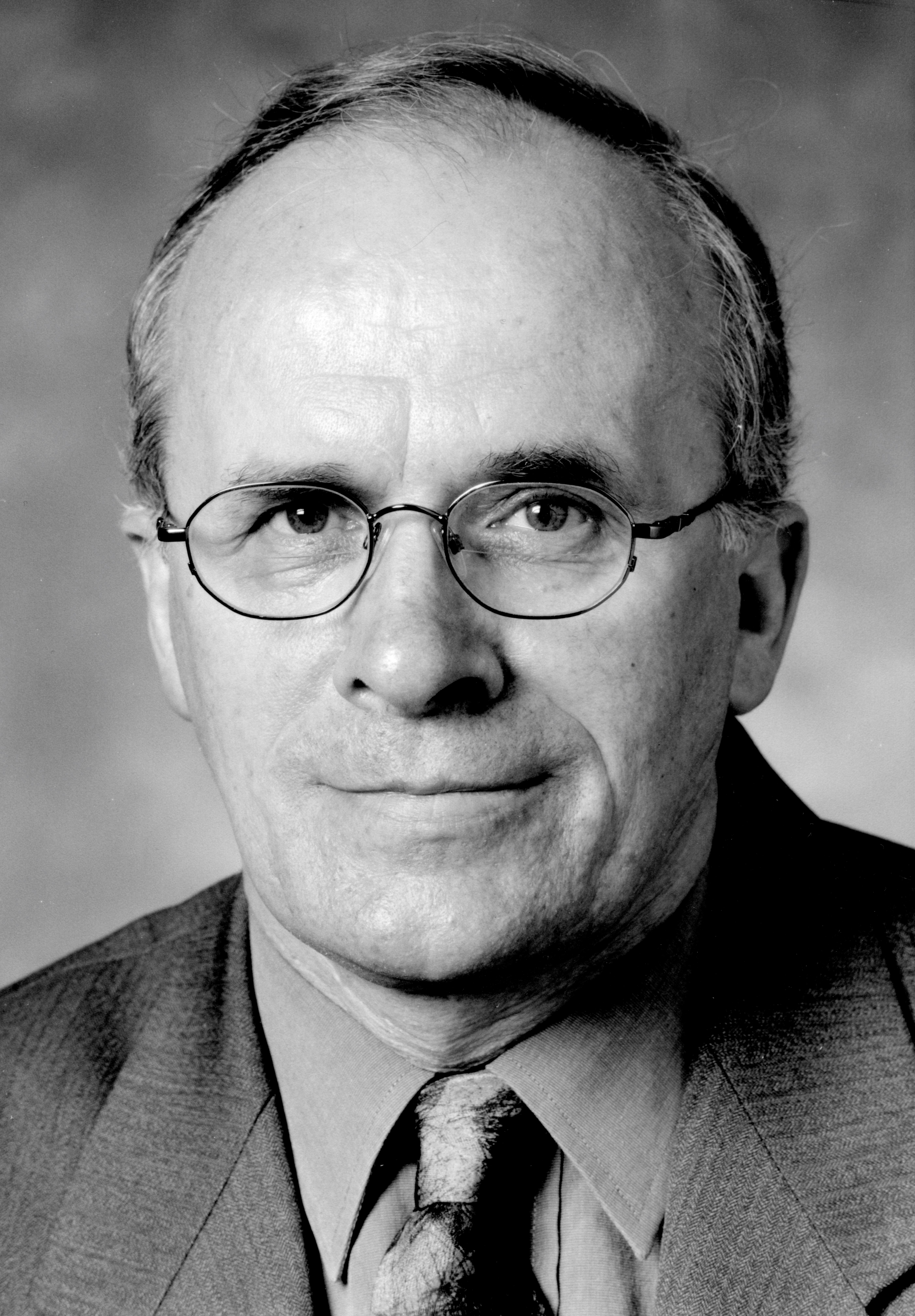
- Jim Doyle in 1999

Mayor of Golden
- In office December 2002 – December 2008
- Preceded by: Walter Red Scott
- Succeeded by: Aman Virk
- In office December 1981 – December 1990

Member of the British Columbia Legislative Assembly for Columbia River-Revelstoke
- In office October 17, 1991 – May 16, 2001
- Preceded by: Riding Established
- Succeeded by: Wendy McMahon

Golden Municipal Councillor
- In office December 1976 – December 1981

Personal details
- Born: October 28, 1943 (age 82) County Down, Ireland
- Party: British Columbia New Democratic Party (1972-Present)
- Spouse: Judy Reay Doyle
- Occupation: Canadian Pacific Railway

Jim Doyle (born October 28, 1943) is a politician in British Columbia, Canada. Doyle held public office for 30 years; five years as a councillor; fifteen as mayor of Golden, British Columbia, and ten years as a member of the legislative assembly and cabinet minister. Doyle is the longest serving mayor in Golden's history.

== Early life ==
Doyle was born in Kilkinamurry, County Down Ireland, one of ten children. His passion for politics was sparked while working in Brisbane, Australia before emigrating to Canada in 1967.

== Local government ==
Doyle was elected as a municipal councillor in Golden in 1976 and subsequently re-elected in 1978 and 1980. He went on to serve as mayor from 1981 to 1990.

== Legislative Assembly ==
Following a 24-year career with the Canadian Pacific Railway Doyle was elected to the legislative assembly for the New Democratic Party in 1991 for the riding of Columbia River-Revelstoke. He was subsequently re-elected in 1996 and, during his second term as an MLA, held various offices within the provincial government, first as parliamentary secretary to the minister of municipal affairs. With the exception of a short period between February and November 2000 when Doyle was minister of forests, he served as minister of municipal affairs from July 1999 until nearly the full caucus defeat of the party less two members in the election of May 2001.

== Subsequent career ==
The 2001 legislative election saw all but two of incumbent NDP's candidates, including Doyle, defeated. In 2002 he successfully campaigned for re-election mayor of Golden and was handily re-elected. Doyle stepped down as mayor in December 2008 and was followed by councillor Aman Virk.

British Columbia provincial government of Ujjal Dosanjh
Cabinet posts (2)
Predecessor	Office	Successor
Cathy McGregor	Minister of Municipal Affairs; November 1, 2000–June 5, 2001	George Abbott
David Zirnhelt	Minister of Forests; February 29, 2000–November 1, 2000	Gordon Wilson
British Columbia provincial government of Dan Miller
Cabinet post (1)
Predecessor	Office	Successor
cont'd from Clark Ministry	Minister of Municipal Affairs; August 25, 1999–February 24, 2000	Cathy McGregor
British Columbia provincial government of Glen Clark
Cabinet post (1)
Predecessor	Office	Successor
Jenny Kwan	Minister of Municipal Affairs; July 21, 1999–August 25, 1999	cont'd into Miller Ministry
