= Cathy McGregor =

Canadian politician (born 1955)

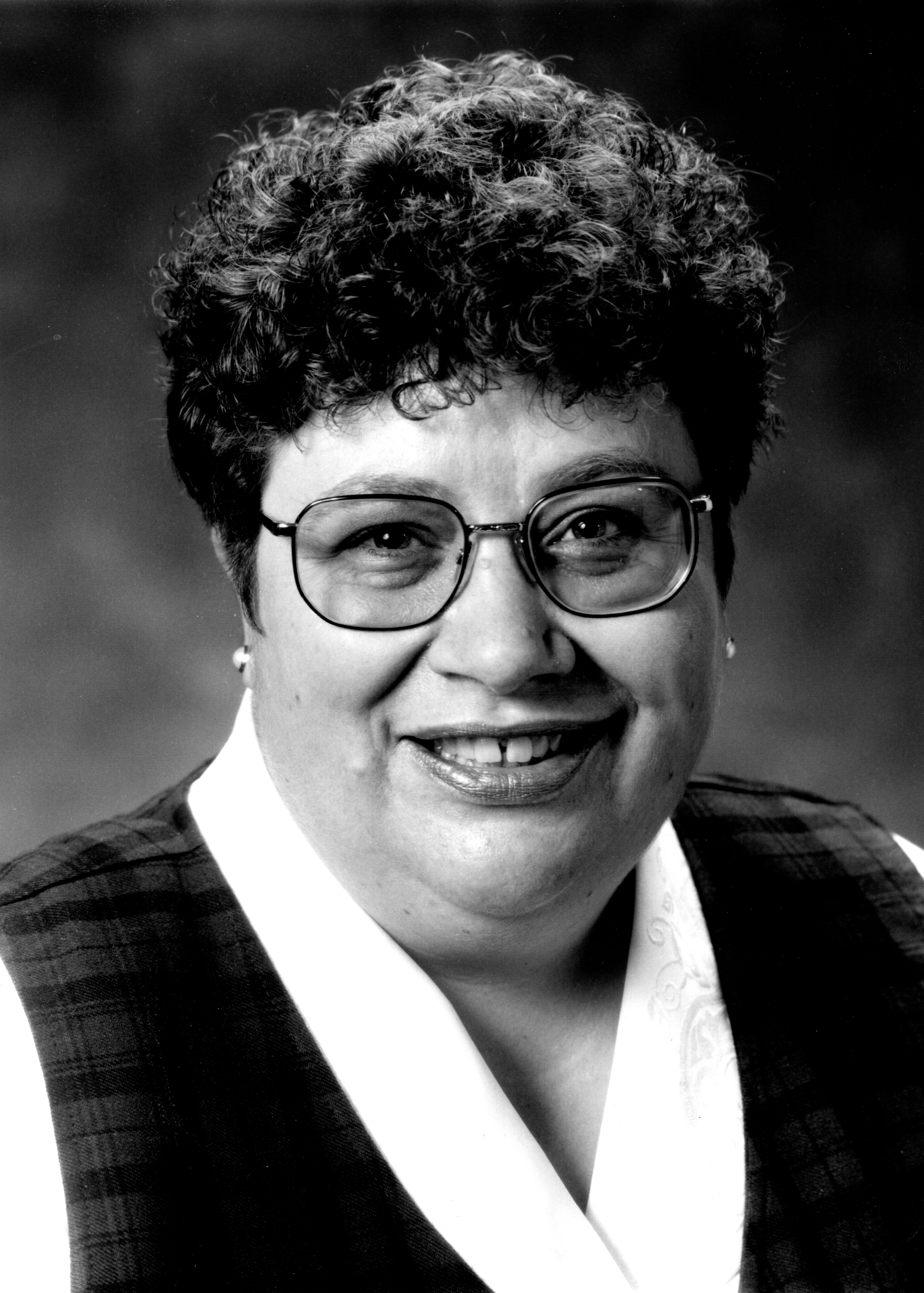

Member of the British Columbia Legislative Assembly for Kamloops
- In office May 28, 1996 – May 16, 2001
- Preceded by: Arthur Charbonneau
- Succeeded by: Claude Richmond

Personal details
- Born: June 8, 1955 (age 70) Victoria, British Columbia
- Profession: teacher

Catherine McGregor (born June 8, 1955) is a Canadian educator and political figure in British Columbia. She represented Kamloops in the Legislative Assembly of British Columbia from 1996 to 2001 as a British Columbia New Democratic Party (NDP) member.

She was educated at the University of Victoria and Simon Fraser University. McGregor taught elementary school for 19 years and also served as a teacher librarian. She served in the provincial cabinet as Minister of Municipal Affairs, as Minister of Environment, Lands and Parks and as Minister of Advanced Education, Training and Technology and Minister Responsible for Youth. In 1999 she announced a $2 million allocation for the B.C. provincial park system. McGregor was defeated by Claude Richmond when she ran for reelection in 2001.

She continues to be involved in education as the Associate Professor in the School of Educational Psychology and Leadership Studies and Associate Dean of Graduate Programs and Research at University of Victoria.

British Columbia provincial government of Ujjal Dosanjh
Cabinet posts (3)
Predecessor	Office	Successor
Graeme Bowbrick	Minister of Advanced Education, Training & Technology; November 1, 2000 – June 5, 2001	Shirley Bond
Graeme Bowbrick	Minister Responsible for Youth; November 1, 2000 – June 5, 2001	Ministry Abolished
Jim Doyle	Minister of Transportation and Highways; February 29, 2000 – November 1, 2000	Jim Doyle
British Columbia provincial government of Glen Clark
Cabinet post (1)
Predecessor	Office	Successor
Paul Ramsey	Minister of Environment, Lands and Parks; January 6, 1997 – July 21, 1999	Joan Sawicki
