= Columbia River-Revelstoke =

Provincial electoral district in British Columbia, Canada

British Columbia electoral district

Provincial electoral district
- Legislature: Legislative Assembly of British Columbia
MLA
Scott McInnis
Conservative
- First contested: 1991
- Last contested: 2026

Demographics
- Population (2021): 40,904
- Area (km²): 39,719
- Pop. density (per km²): 1
- Census division(s): Columbia-Shuswap, East Kootenay
- Census subdivision(s): Revelstoke, Kimberley, Golden, Invermere, Radium Hot Springs, Canal Flats

Columbia River-Revelstoke is a provincial electoral district for the Legislative Assembly of British Columbia.

Created under the 1991 British Columbia electoral redistribution, the district was first contested in the 1991 general election. It was created from parts of Columbia River and Shuswap-Revelstoke.

== Demographics ==
Population, 2021	40,904
Area (km^{2})	39,719
Pop. Density (people per km^{2})	1
Source: BC Electoral Boundaries Commission

== Geography ==
The district comprises the eastern portion of the Columbia-Shuswap Regional District and the northern portion of the Regional District of East Kootenay. It is located in southeastern British Columbia and is bordered by Alberta to the east. Communities in the electoral district consist of Kimberley, Revelstoke, Golden, Invermere, Canal Flats, and Radium Hot Springs.

== Members of the Legislative Assembly ==
This riding has elected the following members of the Legislative Assembly:

Assembly	Years	Member	Party
Columbia River-Revelstoke; Riding created from Columbia River and Shuswap-Revelstoke
35th	1991–1996	Jim Doyle	New Democratic
36th	1996–2001	Jim Doyle	New Democratic
37th	2001–2005	Wendy McMahon	Liberal
38th	2005–2009	Norm Macdonald	New Democratic
39th	2009–2013	Norm Macdonald	New Democratic
40th	2013–2017	Norm Macdonald	New Democratic
41st	2017–2020	Doug Clovechok	Liberal
42nd	2020–2023	Doug Clovechok	Liberal
42nd	2023–2024	Doug Clovechok	BC United
43rd	2024–2026	Scott McInnis	Conservative
43rd	2026–2026	Scott McInnis	Independent
43rd	2026–2026	Scott McInnis	Conservative
44th	2026–present	Scott McInnis	Conservative

== Election results ==
2026 British Columbia general election
Party	Candidate	Votes	%	±%	Expenditures
Conservative	Scott McInnis	8,893	52.5	+4.6	
New Democratic	Andrea Dunlop	6,100	36.0	-8.2	
Green	Rana Nelson	1,942	11.5	+3.6	
Total valid votes		16,935			
Total rejected ballots					
Turnout					
Registered voters					
Conservative hold		Swing		+16.5	
Source: Elections BC

2024 British Columbia general election
Party	Candidate	Votes	%	±%	Expenditures
Conservative	Scott McInnis	8,768	47.92	–	$21,002.23
New Democratic	Andrea Dunlop	8,098	44.26	+6.6	$24,417.66
Green	Calvin Beauchesne	1,430	7.82	−5.1	$2,997.00
Total valid votes/expense limit		18,296	99.78	–	$71,700.08
Total rejected ballots		41	0.22	–	
Turnout		18,337	58.46	–	
Registered voters		31,366			
Conservative notional gain from BC United		Swing		N/A (Note: Swing cannot be calculated as BC United did not run a candidate in this riding.)	
Source: Elections BC

2020 British Columbia general election
Party	Candidate	Votes	%	±%	Expenditures
Liberal	Doug Clovechok	7,034	48.03	+2.59	$45,602.42
New Democratic	Nicole Cherlet	5,708	38.97	+2.95	$21,352.76
Green	Samson Boyer	1,904	13.00	+1.28	$1,036.37
Total valid votes		14,646	100.00	–	
Total rejected ballots					
Turnout					
Registered voters					
Source: Elections BC

2018 British Columbia electoral reform referendum
Side	Votes	%
First Past the Post	6,052	57.13
Proportional representation	4,541	42.87

2017 British Columbia general election
Party	Candidate	Votes	%	Expenditures
Liberal	Doug Clovechok	6,620	45.44	$68,902
New Democratic	Gerry Taft	5,248	36.02	$41,126
Green	Samson Boyer	1,708	11.72	$1,300
Independent	Duncan Boyd MacLeod	469	3.22	
Independent	Justin James Hooles	371	2.55	$2,267
Libertarian	Rylan Kashuba	154	1.05	
Total valid votes		14,570	100.00	
Total rejected ballots		66	0.45	
Turnout		14,636	59.79	
Source: Elections BC

2013 British Columbia general election
Party	Candidate	Votes	%
New Democratic	Norm Macdonald	6,463	48.26
Liberal	Doug Clovechok	4,847	36.19
Conservative	Earl Olsen	1,162	8.68
Green	Laurel Ralston	921	6.88
Total valid votes		13,393	100.00
Total rejected ballots		45	0.33
Turnout		13,438	53.60
Source: Elections BC

B.C. General Election 2009: Columbia River-Revelstoke
Party	Candidate	Votes	%	±	Expenditures
New Democratic	Norm Macdonald	7,419	55.29%	–	$39,287
Liberal	Mark McKee	5,093	37.95%	–	$120,550
Green	Sarah Svensson	907	6.76%	–	$350
Total Valid Votes		13,419	100%		
Total Rejected Ballots		101	0.75%		
Turnout		13,520	56.17%%		

B.C. General Election 2005: Columbia River-Revelstoke
Party	Candidate	Votes	%	±	Expenditures
NDP	Norm Macdonald	7,460	51.71%		$38,430
Liberal	Wendy McMahon	5,750	39.86%		$93,950
Green	Andy Shadrack	1,217	8.44%	–	$168
Total Valid Votes		14,427	100		
Total Rejected Ballots		104	0.72		
Turnout		14,531	62.47		

Result: NDP gain from BC Liberal

B.C. General Election 2001: Columbia River-Revelstoke
Party	Candidate	Votes	%	±	Expenditures
Liberal	Wendy McMahon	7,804	53.95%		$49,873
NDP	Jim Doyle	4,551	31.46%		$26,852
Green	Jennifer R. Brownlee	978	6.76%	–	
Marijuana	Lisa A. Kirkman	642	4.44%		$1,123
Unity	Miles Lehn	490	3.39%		$1,001
Total valid votes		14,465	100.00%		
Total rejected ballots		46	0.32%		
Turnout		14,511	71.96%		

Result: BC Liberal gain from NDP

B.C. General Election 1996: Columbia River-Revelstoke
Party	Candidate	Votes	%	±	Expenditures
NDP	Jim Doyle	6,264	42.52%		$30,948
Liberal	Brian Allan McMahon	5,172	35.10%		$49,056
Reform	Steve V. Pinchak	2,687	18.24%		$17,470
Progressive Democrat	Dave Herman	282	1.91%	–	$100
Green	Rhonda Smith	270	1.83%	–	$636
Natural Law	Sonia Stairs	58	0.39%		$100
Total valid votes		14,733	100.00%		
Total rejected ballots		74	0.78%		
Turnout		14,807	71.04%		

B.C. General Election 1991: Columbia River-Revelstoke
Party	Candidate	Votes	%	±	Expenditures
NDP	Jim Doyle	6,241	45.08%		$28,972
Social Credit	Duane Crandall	4,362	31.51%	–	$39,088
Liberal	Margaret R. Mellor	3,241	23.41%		$1,012
Total valid votes		13,844	100.00%		
Total rejected ballots		231	1.64%		
Turnout		14,075	74.78%		

== See also ==
- List of British Columbia provincial electoral districts
- Canadian provincial electoral districts
