= Edwin James Rothwell =

Canadian politician

Edwin James Rothwell (October 19, 1870 – June 29, 1927) was a physician and political figure in British Columbia. He represented New Westminster in the Legislative Assembly of British Columbia from 1924 to 1927 as a Liberal.

He was born in Brantford, Ontario, the son of William Rothwell and Margaret Turnbull, and was educated at Toronto University. Rothwell came to British Columbia in January 1897, passed the examination by the provincial council of physicians and surgeons and set up practice in Trail. In 1900, he married Eva McBee. Rothwell moved to New Westminster in 1902 and entered practice there in partnership with Dr. T. S. Hall. He died in office in Quesnel at the age of 56.
