= Arthur Charbonneau =

Canadian politician (1939–2025)

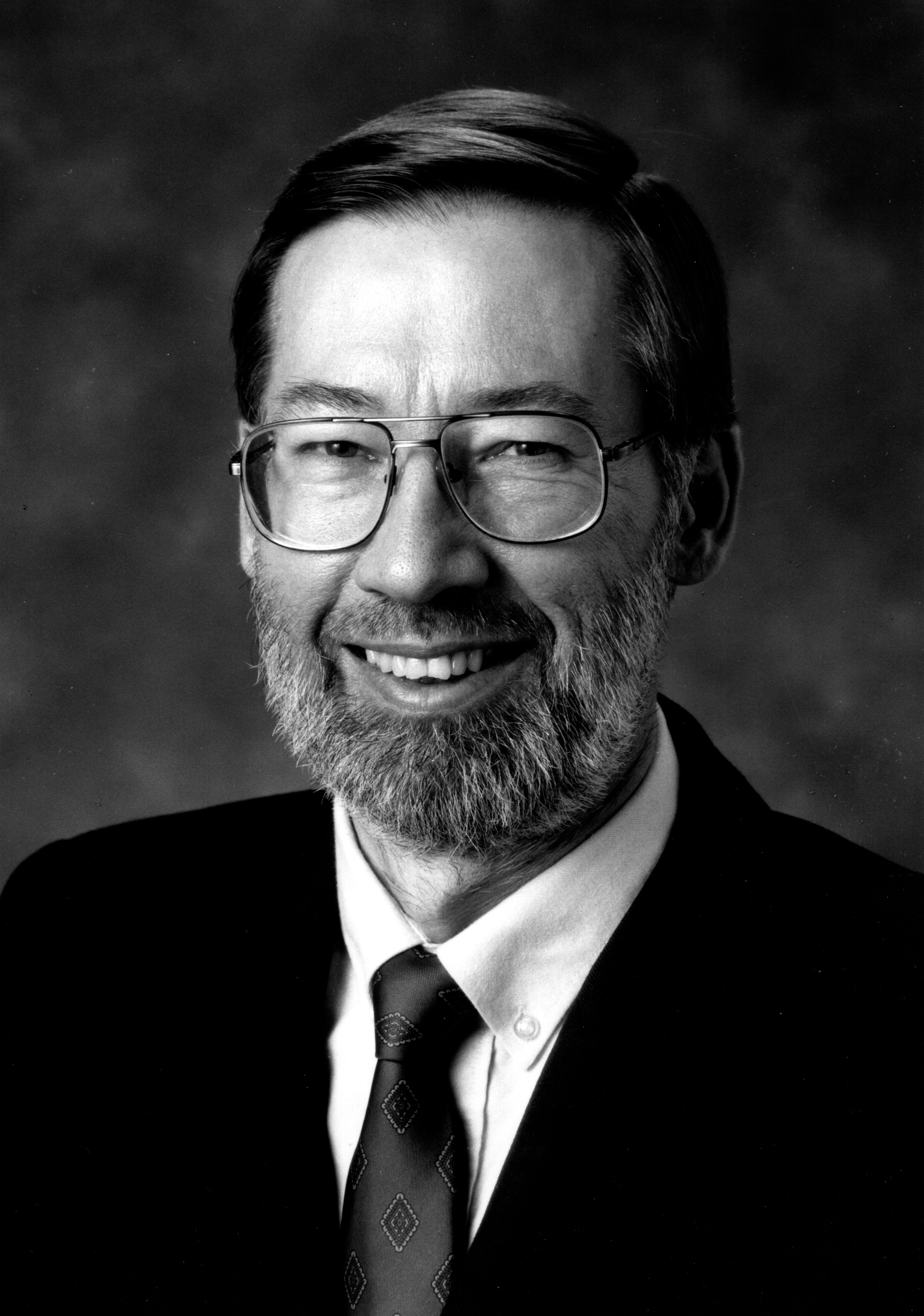

Member of the British Columbia Legislative Assembly for Kamloops
- In office October 17, 1991 – May 28, 1996
- Preceded by: Claude Richmond; Bud Smith
- Succeeded by: Cathy McGregor

Personal details
- Born: August 20, 1939 Regina, Saskatchewan, Canada
- Died: April 25, 2025 (aged 85) Nanaimo, British Columbia, Canada
- Party: New Democratic

Arthur Leo Charbonneau (August 20, 1939 – April 25, 2025) was a Canadian politician. He served in the Legislative Assembly of British Columbia from 1991 to 1996, as a NDP member for the constituency of Kamloops. He served in the cabinet as Minister of Transport and Highways, Minister of Forests, Minister of Education, and Minister of Government Services and Sport. Charbonneau died in Nanaimo, British Columbia on April 25, 2025, at the age of 85.
