= Robert Broughton (activist) =

Canadian activist

Robert Stanley Broughton (born January 26, 1950) served as President of the Vancouver Bicycle Club from 1992 to 1994, and was president of Airspace Action on Smoking and Health from 1996 to 2001. He was president of the New Westminster Tennis Club in 2006 and 2007. As President of the Vancouver Bicycle Club, he played a role in the establishment of the Union-Adanac bicycle route, and was one of the founders of the Vancouver Area Cycling Coalition. As President of Airspace, he:

- exposed a tobacco-industry-funded research program at the University of British Columbia
- played a major role in drawing attention to inadequate enforcement of laws prohibiting the sale of cigarettes to minors. (Airspace was the most prominent anti-tobacco organization in British Columbia on these two issues.)
- played a role in getting no-smoking bylaws passed in Vancouver, Burnaby, and New Westminster.
- arranged for a private member's bill to be introduced in the Legislative Assembly which would have banned the sale of flavoured snuff products in BC.

Broughton was also a long-term Director of the Western Canada Wilderness Committee.

He has been a computer programmer since graduating from Virginia Tech in 1972. He realized the potential of the Internet when Mosaic started getting widespread usage, and was responsible for the Vancouver Bicycle Club, Airspace, and the Western Canada Wilderness Committee getting head starts in having an Internet presence. His work on the Western Canada Wilderness Committee site included the campaign to protect the Ursus Valley in Clayoquot Sound, and he also created a site for the Ahousaht First Nations' Women's eco-tourism initiative in 1995. He created a web page for the now-defunct Progressive Democratic Alliance, which made that party one of the first political parties to have a web presence.

Broughton was born in Fredericksburg, Virginia. He lived mostly in Virginia (except for some time in New Jersey and Florida) until moving to Vancouver in 1981. He lived in Oslo, Norway for 3 1/2 years in the late 1980s. He became a Canadian citizen in 1994. He was the Green Party candidate for New Westminster in the 2001 and 2005 provincial elections.

He has traveled extensively in Northern Europe, Peru, Mexico, and Russia. He retired in 2012, and lived in Guanajuato, Mexico from 2012 to 2022. He was active in the San Miguel de Allende Center of PEN International and a supporter of the ABBA House migrant shelter in Celaya. He currently lives in Victoria, British Columbia.
