= Semlin ministry =

Cabinet of British Columbia, 1898–1900

- 12th ministry of British Columbia
- Date formed: August 15, 1898
- Date dissolved: February 27, 1900

People and organisations
- Monarch: Victoria
- Lieutenant Governor: Thomas Robert McInnes
- Premier: Charles Augustus Semlin
- No. of ministers: 6
- Member parties: Non-partisan

History
- Election: 1898 election
- Legislature term: 8th Parliament
- Predecessor: Turner ministry
- Successor: Martin ministry

The Semlin ministry was the combined Cabinet that governed British Columbia from August 15, 1898, to February 27, 1900. It was led by Charles Augustus Semlin, the 12th premier of British Columbia. It was formed in the aftermath of the 1898 election, in which Lieutenant Governor Thomas Robert McInnes dismissed incumbent premier John Herbert Turner and asked Semlin to form a ministry instead.

The ministry came to an end shortly after the defeat of government legislation concerning electoral reform. Though Semlin negotiated with opposition members to regain the legislature's confidence, McIness instead dismissed him and invited Joseph Martin to form the Martin ministry.

== List of ministers ==
Semlin ministry by portfolio
Portfolio	Minister	Tenure	
Portfolio	Minister	Start	End
Premier of British Columbia	Charles Augustus Semlin	August 15, 1898	February 27, 1900
President of the Council	Robert McKechnie	August/September, (Note: exact date uncertain) 1898	February 27, 1900
Attorney General	Joseph Martin	August 15, 1898	July 27, 1899
Attorney General	Alexander Henderson	August 7, 1899	February 27, 1900
Minister of Finance and Agriculture	Francis Lovett Carter-Cotton	August 15, 1898	February 27, 1900
Minister of Education	Joseph Martin	August 15, 1898	March 9, 1899
Minister of Education	Charles Augustus Semlin	March 9, 1899	February 27, 1900
Chief Commissioner of Lands and Works	Charles Augustus Semlin	August 15, 1898	March 9, 1899
Chief Commissioner of Lands and Works	Francis Lovett Carter-Cotton	March 9, 1899	February 27, 1900
Minister of Mines	Francis Lovett Carter-Cotton	August 17, 1898	August 20, 1898
Minister of Mines	John Frederick Hume	August 20, 1898	February 27, 1900
Provincial Secretary	Joseph Martin	August 17, 1898	August 20, 1898
Provincial Secretary	John Frederick Hume	August 20, 1898	March 9, 1899
Provincial Secretary	Charles Augustus Semlin	March 9, 1899	February 27, 1900
Minister without portfolio	Robert McKechnie	August 17, 1898	February 27, 1900

== New ministries ==
After a cabinet shuffle in March 1899, John Hume left his role as Provincial Secretary but retained his position as Minister of Mines. This was the first time that Minister of Mines had not been held jointly with another position; the split was due to the increased duties for the role.
