= Joseph Martin ministry =

Cabinet of British Columbia in 1900

Martin ministry
- 13th ministry of British Columbia
- Date formed: February 28, 1900
- Date dissolved: June 14, 1900

People and organisations
- Monarch: Victoria
- Lieutenant Governor: Thomas Robert McInnes
- Premier: Joseph Martin
- No. of ministers: 5
- Ministers removed: 1
- Total no. of members: 6
- Member parties: Non-partisan

History
- Legislature term: 8th Parliament
- Predecessor: Semlin ministry
- Successor: Dunsmuir ministry

The Martin ministry was the combined Cabinet that governed British Columbia from February 27, 1900, to June 14, 1900. It was led by Joseph Martin, the 13th premier of British Columbia. It was formed after the previous government, the Semlin ministry, lost confidence of the legislature and Lieutenant Governor Thomas Robert McInnes invited Martin to form a new ministry.

On March 1, the day after he took office, Martin lost a confidence vote in the legislature almost unanimously. Nevertheless, he remained in office and continued appointing members to his cabinet. As he had few supporters in the legislature, his cabinet was largely composed of members without legislative experience. Martin eventually called an election on June 9, in which only a handful of his supporters were elected; as a result, McInness instead called on James Dunsmuir to form the Dunsmuir ministry.

== List of ministers ==
Martin ministry by portfolio
Portfolio	Minister	Tenure	
Portfolio	Minister	Start	End
Premier of British Columbia	Joseph Martin	February 28, 1900	June 14, 1900
Attorney General	Joseph Martin	February 28, 1900	June 14, 1900
Minister of Finance and Agriculture	Smith Curtis	March 1, 1900	April 3, 1900
Minister of Finance and Agriculture	Cory Spencer Ryder	April 3, 1900	May 3, 1900
Minister of Finance and Agriculture	John Cunningham Brown	May 3, 1900	June 14, 1900
Minister of Education	James Stuart Yates	March 12, 1900	June 14, 1900
Chief Commissioner of Lands and Works	James Stuart Yates	March 1, 1900	June 14, 1900
Minister of Mines	Smith Curtis	February 28, 1900	June 14, 1900
Provincial Secretary	James Stuart Yates	February 28, 1900	March 24, 1900
Provincial Secretary	George Washington Beebe	March 24, 1900	June 14, 1900
