= Dunsmuir ministry =

Cabinet of British Columbia, 1900–1902

- 14th ministry of British Columbia
- Date formed: June 15, 1900
- Date dissolved: November 21, 1902

People and organisations
- Monarch: Victoria (1900–1901); Edward VII (1901–1902)
- Lieutenant Governor: Thomas Robert McInnes (1900); Henri-Gustave Joly de Lotbinière (1900–1902)
- Premier: James Dunsmuir
- No. of ministers: 5
- Ministers removed: 3
- Total no. of members: 8
- Member parties: Non-partisan

History
- Election: 1900
- Legislature term: 9th Parliament
- Predecessor: Martin ministry
- Successor: Prior ministry

The Dunsmuir ministry was the combined Cabinet that governed British Columbia from June 15, 1900, to November 21, 1902. It was led by James Dunsmuir, the 14th premier of British Columbia. It was formed following the 1900 general election, in which the incumbent premier, Joseph Martin, failed to gain a majority; he subsequently recommended Dunsmuir as the next government leader.

On November 21, 1902, Dunsmuir submitted his resignation to Lieutenant Governor Henri-Gustave Joly de Lotbinière and recommended Edward Gawler Prior as his successor. Joly de Lotbinière then invited Prior to form a government, who accepted and formed the Prior ministry.

== List of ministers ==
Dunsmuir ministry by portfolio
| Portfolio | Minister | Tenure | |
| Portfolio | Minister | Start | End |
|---|---|---|---|
| Premier of British Columbia | James Dunsmuir | June 15, 1900 | November 21, 1902 |
| President of the Council | James Dunsmuir | June 15, 1900 | November 21, 1902 |
| Attorney General | David McEwen Eberts | June 15, 1900 | November 21, 1902 |
| Minister of Finance and Agriculture | John Herbert Turner | June 15, 1900 | September 3, 1901 |
| Minister of Finance and Agriculture | James Douglas Prentice | September 3, 1901 | November 21, 1902 |
| Minister of Education | James Douglas Prentice | June 21, 1900 | September 3, 1901 |
| Minister of Education | John Cunningham Brown | September 3, 1901 | September 30, 1901 |
| Minister of Education | James Douglas Prentice (Note: Acting) | September 30, 1901 | November 21, 1902 |
| Chief Commissioner of Lands and Works | Wilmer Cleveland Wells | June 21, 1900 | November 21, 1902 |
| Minister of Mines | Richard McBride | June 21, 1900 | September 3, 1901 |
| Minister of Mines | David McEwen Eberts | September 3, 1901 | February 27, 1902 |
| Minister of Mines | Edward Gawler Prior | February 27, 1902 | November 21, 1902 |
| Provincial Secretary | James Douglas Prentice | June 21, 1900 | September 3, 1901 |
| Provincial Secretary | John Cunningham Brown | September 3, 1901 | September 30, 1901 |
| Provincial Secretary | James Douglas Prentice | September 30, 1901 | November 21, 1902 |

== Cabinet shuffles ==
On September 3, 1901, finance minister John Herbert Turner resigned in order to become the province's agent general in London and was succeeded by James Douglas Prentice; Prentice, the provincial secretary and education minister, was in turn succeeded by John Cunningham Brown. Brown was an ally of former premier Joseph Martin, and his appointment was opposed by Richard McBride – Martin's political rival – who resigned from cabinet in protest. On September 18, Brown was defeated in a ministerial by-election. Two weeks later, on October 4, Brown resigned from cabinet, and Prentice regained the portfolios while also remaining minister of finance and agriculture.

On March 6, 1902, Edward Gawler Prior joined cabinet as minister of mines, filling the absence left by McBride.
