= Government House (British Columbia) =

Residence of the Lieutenant Governor of British Columbia

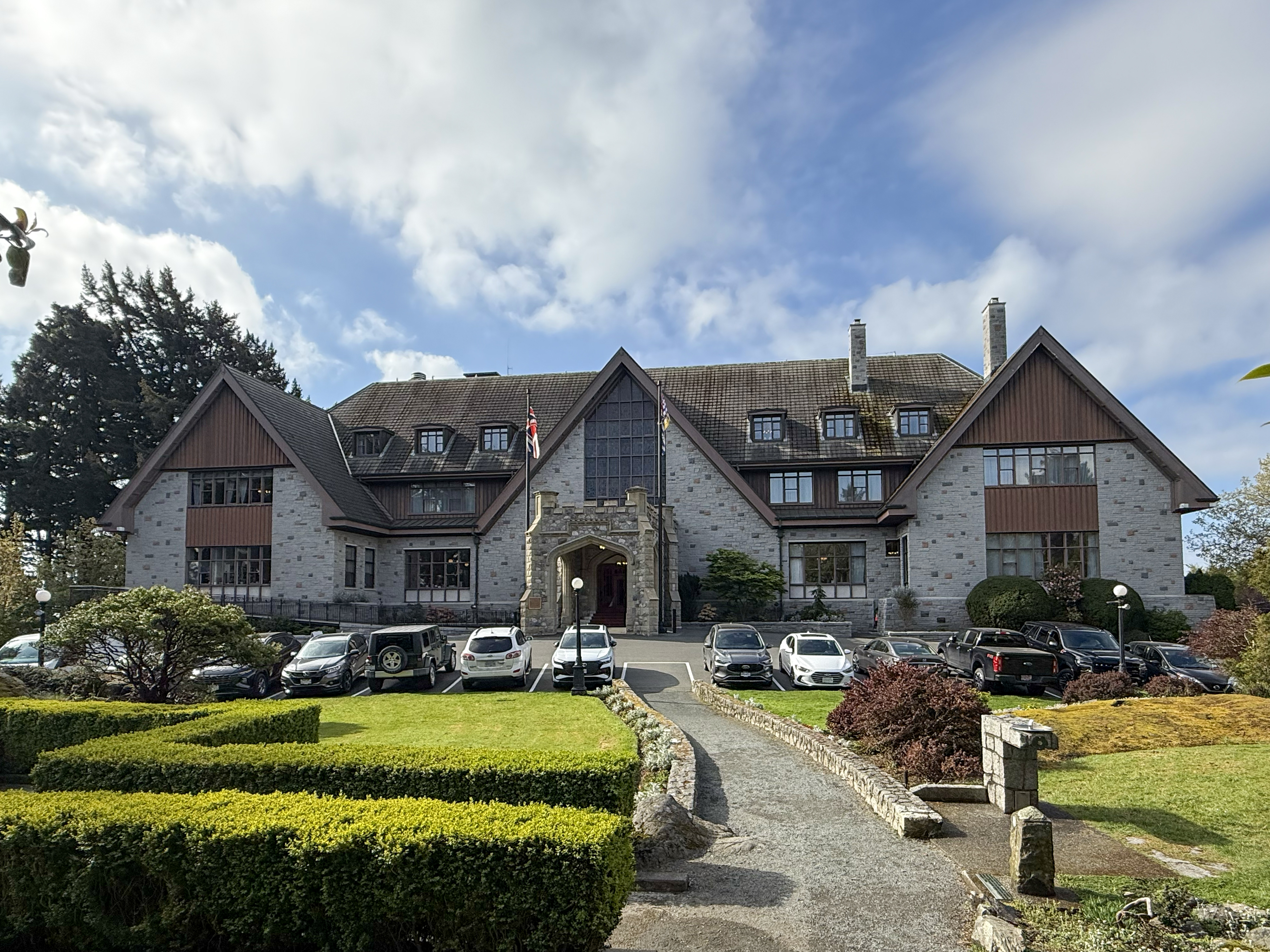
- Main façade of Government House in 2026
- Interactive map of the Government House area

General information
- Architectural style: Modern Tudor revival
- Location: 1401 Rockland Avenue; Victoria, British Columbia; V8S 1V9
- Coordinates: 48.418464°N 123.342434°W
- Construction started: 1857
- Client: The King in Right of British Columbia
- Owner: The King in Right of British Columbia

Technical details
- Structural system: Steel frame and reinforced concrete

National Historic Site of Canada
- Official name: Estate of the Lieutenant Governor of British Columbia National Historic Site of Canada
- Designated: 2002

Government House of British Columbia is the official residence of the lieutenant governor of British Columbia in Victoria and is vice-regal residence. It has casually been described as "the Ceremonial Home of all British Columbians." It stands in the provincial capital on a 14.6-hectare (36-acre) estate at 1401 Rockland Avenue; while the equivalent building in many countries has a prominent, central place in the capital, the site of British Columbia's Government House is relatively unobtrusive within Victoria, giving it more the character of a private home.

== History ==
The first building in the area used specifically as a governor's residence was Cary Castle, built in 1860 by George Hunter Cary and purchased five years later by the British Crown for use as an official residence for the governor of Vancouver Island, with Arthur Kennedy, CB, being the first occupant. Following the 1866 merger of the colonies of British Columbia and Vancouver Island, the mainland colony's Government House in New Westminster was abandoned to other uses and Cary Castle became the official residence of the new united colony's governor and, from 1871 onwards, that of the provincial lieutenant governor.

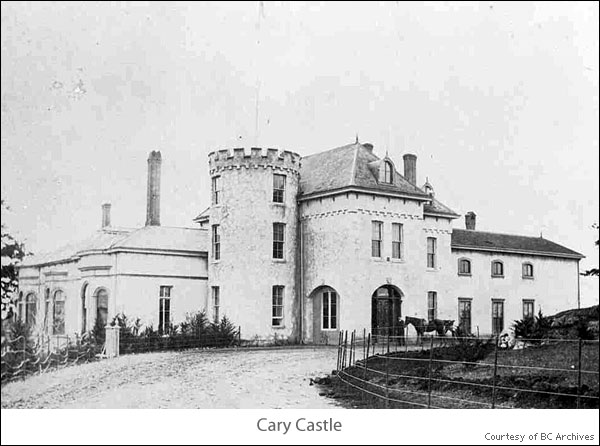
Cary Castle, British Columbia's first Government House

The mansion and its contents were destroyed by fire in May 1899, with a replacement immediately built to designs by Francis Rattenbury and Samuel Maclure. Completed in 1903, this house was used for the first time by the reigning monarch of Canada when King George VI, accompanied by his wife, Queen Elizabeth, arrived in 1939 as part of his cross-Canada tour that year. However, that incarnation of Government House also burnt down when it caught fire on 15 April 1957; the current Government House was begun soon after and completed on 19 May, two years later by John Laing & Sons. The new home was furnished with pieces bought in the United Kingdom by Lieutenant Governor Frank Mackenzie Ross and then donated to the Crown following his departure from office, as well as other items donated by various British Columbians.

By 2002, through the efforts of Lieutenant Governor Iona Campagnolo, Government House and its surrounding gardens were designated as a National Historic Site of Canada and the acknowledging plaque was unveiled by Campagnolo on 2 October of that year.

== Ownership and use ==
Government House is where visiting foreign dignitaries are greeted and often stay while in Victoria. It is also where numerous vice-regal events take place, such as the bestowing of provincial awards or inductions into the Order of British Columbia, as well as luncheons, dinners, receptions, and speaking engagements. Among many public receptions and garden parties held annually, the lieutenant governor's New Years Day levée remains a popular and well-attended highlight of the holiday season in Victoria. It is also at the vice-regal residence that the lieutenant governor drops the writs of election, swears-in new members of the Executive Council, and hold audience with the premier.

The property is owned by the King in Right of British Columbia; as with other Crown property, Government House is held in trust for future rulers and cannot be sold by the monarch except by his lieutenant governor with the proper advice and consent from the Executive Council of British Columbia. The management of the residence is, however, overseen by the British Columbia Government House Foundation, a charitable, non-profit organisation that was in 1987 established by Lieutenant Governor Robert Gordon Rogers, along with his Council at the time. The foundation is mandated to oversee the maintenance of Government House's property and all the structures on it; the acquisition, either on loan or permanently, of British Columbia artworks for display in the royal residence; the management of official gifts to the lieutenant governor or monarch in right of British Columbia; and public awareness of Government House, its history, and value. Besides the four honorary trustees—the lieutenant governor, the viceregal consort, the chief justice of British Columbia, and the private secretary to the lieutenant governor—the foundation also has trustees elected for three-year terms from artistic, horticultural, historical, and legal segments of provincial society.

== Architecture and interiors ==
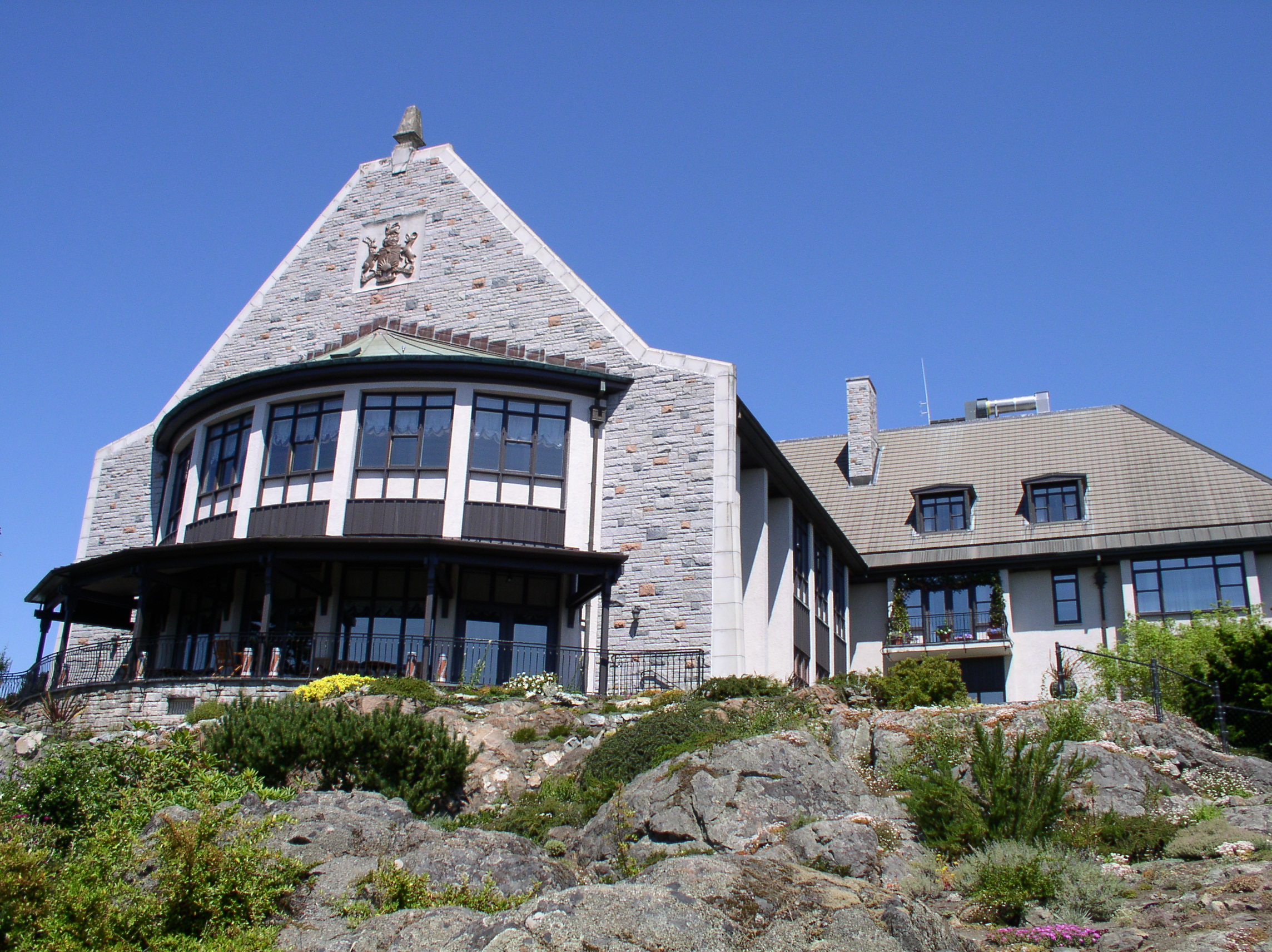
The southeast view of Government House from below, showing the bow window of the Ballroom at left

The present Government House is a T-shaped, four level (including the basement) building of steel frame construction clad in a Modern Tudor revival envelope. The walls are of rusticated blue, grey, and pink British Columbia granite with Haddington Island stone trim, and the roof, which is two storeys high in itself, has steeply pitched, chalet-style gables and numerous dormer windows. A rendition of the Royal Arms of British Columbia is visible in the gable above the Ballroom's south facing bow window, which commands a view over Ross Bay and the lower part of the Fairfield neighbourhood, across the Strait of Juan de Fuca, to the Olympic Mountains in Washington state.

The main entrance is in the centre of the north facade, beneath the original Tudor Revival porte cochère of the previous Government House, which had been inspired by Rattenbury's own Hatley Castle. Behind this is the main entrance hall, the walls lined with oak panelling hung with painted portraits of former lieutenant governors of British Columbia, some of the chatelaines of Government House (the viceroy's wife), and large portraits of Queen Elizabeth II and Prince Philip, Duke of Edinburgh. Rising to the second floor is a large staircase along which are renderings of the escutcheons of various members of the royal family and governors general of Canada who have resided at Government House. The room is capped by a cathedral ceiling and the three storey high north wall is dominated by the Rogers Window, a stained glass creation commissioned by viceregal consort Jane Rogers to commemorate British Columbia's heritage as a parliamentary democracy and constitutional monarchy, the contribution of viceroys and their spouses since the foundation of the Colony of Vancouver Island, and the place of Government House in provincial life. The window, unveiled on 2 May 1990, shows various heraldic devices of the monarch in right of the province and the monarch in right of Canada, natural emblems of British Columbia, and historical artefacts alluding to provincial industry and native heritage.

On axis with the front entrance is the largest room in Government House, the ballroom, which occupies the entire south wing of the building. It rises 12 m (39 ft) past an encircling balcony to a cathedral ceiling, from which hangs three Swiss cut crystal chandeliers that match the multiple wall sconces. Artwork includes the series of Millennium Windows, completed in 2006, that run along each side of the ballroom, and, reflecting the view from the room's south window, is a textile piece entitled Reflections at Government House, by Carol Sabiston. Also for entertaining purposes are the main dining room, modelled after the original Rattenbury and Maclure design with its fir panelling and containing a dining suite purchased in Scotland, and the drawing room, which also evokes the previous incarnation of the room. Available for smaller events are the little drawing room, sometimes called the French Drawing Room because of its furnishings of French origin, including a Sèvres clock and vases, and two rooms named for the architects of the second Government House: the Maclure room, done in an Arts and Crafts style with handcrafted furniture and a copper foil ceiling, and the Rattenbury room, used as a smaller dining room on the mansion's second floor and containing a table and chairs from the eponymous architect's personal collection, on loan from the Royal British Columbia Museum. The mansion also holds numerous art pieces in the Crown collection, including works by British Columbia First Nations artists especially commissioned by the lieutenant governor.

== Grounds ==
Government House's 14.6-hectare (36-acre) property is a publicly accessible area tended by volunteers in the Friends of Government House Gardens Society, and are used frequently by the surrounding community, save for when security otherwise necessitates. The site is divided into numerous different zones according to plant life and/or garden style; for instance, the British Columbia native plant garden contains species unique to the province, and the Cottage Garden is arranged in an informal style with a mixture of ornamental and edible plants. There are also gardens to supply cut flowers, herbs, and an orchard with apple, plum, and quince trees; a rock garden tended by the Heather Society of Victoria; iris, lily, rhododendron, and rose gardens (including a formal Victorian rose garden based on the plan of that at Warwick Castle in England); and water features such as the fountain pond and the duck pond. There is also a unique 8.9-hectare (22-acre) Garry Oak ecosystem.

== See also ==
- Government Houses in Canada
- Government Houses of the British Empire
- History of British Columbia
- List of historic places in Victoria, British Columbia

== Sources ==
- Ritchie, Berry (1997). The Good Builder: The John Laing Story. James & James.
