= John H. Turner ministry =

Cabinet of British Columbia, 1895–1898

- 11th ministry of British Columbia
- Date formed: March 4, 1895
- Date dissolved: August 8, 1898

People and organisations
- Monarch: Victoria
- Lieutenant Governor: Edgar Dewdney (1892–1897); Thomas Robert McInnes (1897–1900)
- Premier: John Herbert Turner
- No. of ministers: 5
- Member parties: Non-partisan

History
- Legislature term: 7th Parliament
- Predecessor: Theodore Davie ministry
- Successor: Semlin ministry

The John H. Turner ministry was the combined Cabinet that governed British Columbia from March 4, 1895, to August 8, 1898. It was led by John Herbert Turner, the eleventh premier of British Columbia.

== List of ministers ==
John H. Turner ministry by portfolio
Portfolio	Minister	Tenure	
Portfolio	Minister	Start	End
Premier of British Columbia	John Herbert Turner	March 4, 1895	August 8, 1898
President of the Council	Charles Edward Pooley	March 4, 1895	August 8, 1898
Attorney General	David McEwen Eberts	March 4, 1895	August 8, 1898
Minister of Finance and Agriculture	John Herbert Turner	March 4, 1895	August 8, 1898
Minister of Education and Immigration	James Baker	March 4, 1895	August 8, 1898
Chief Commissioner of Lands and Works	George Bohun Martin	March 4, 1895	August 8, 1898
Minister of Mines	James Baker	March 4, 1895	August 8, 1898
Provincial Secretary	James Baker	March 4, 1895	August 8, 1898
