= Prior ministry =

Cabinet of British Columbia, 1900–1902

- 15th ministry of British Columbia
- Date formed: November 21, 1902
- Date dissolved: June 1, 1903

People and organisations
- Monarch: Edward VII
- Lieutenant Governor: Henri-Gustave Joly de Lotbinière
- Premier: Edward Gawler Prior
- No. of ministers: 5
- Ministers removed: 4
- Total no. of members: 6
- Member parties: Non-partisan

History
- Legislature term: 9th Parliament
- Predecessor: Dunsmuir ministry
- Successor: McBride ministry

The Prior ministry was the combined Cabinet that governed British Columbia from November 21, 1902, to June 1, 1903. It was led by Edward Gawler Prior, the 15th premier of British Columbia. It was formed during the 9th Parliament, after Premier James Dunsmuir resigned and named Prior as his successor. Prior had been a member of the Dunsmuir ministry.

Prior was dismissed as premier by Lieutenant Governor Henri-Gustave Joly de Lotbinière over a conflict of interest scandal that implicated several ministers, including Prior. Joly de Lotbinière then invited opposition leader Richard McBride to form the McBride ministry.

This was the last British Columbia ministry to be non-partisan. It is also the last time in Canadian political history that a lieutenant governor dismissed a premier.

== List of ministers ==
Prior ministry by portfolio
Portfolio	Minister	Tenure	
Portfolio	Minister	Start	End
Premier of British Columbia	Edward Gawler Prior	November 21, 1902	June 1, 1903
President of the Council	William Wallace Burns McInnes	November 25, 1902	May 27, 1903
Attorney General	David McEwen Eberts	November 25, 1902	May 27, 1903
Minister of Finance and Agriculture	James Douglas Prentice	November 21, 1902	June 1, 1903
Minister of Education	Denis Murphy	November 22, 1902	November 28, 1902
Minister of Education	William Wallace Burns McInnes	December 1, 1902	May 27, 1903
Chief Commissioner of Lands and Works	Wilmer Cleveland Wells	November 22, 1902	May 27, 1903
Minister of Mines	Edward Gawler Prior	November 21, 1902	June 1, 1903
Provincial Secretary	Denis Murphy	November 22, 1902	November 28, 1902
Provincial Secretary	William Wallace Burns McInnes	December 1, 1902	May 27, 1903

== Cabinet shuffles ==
On November 28, only days after appointment, Denis Murphy resigned from cabinet. His resignation took Prior by surprise, and Murphy gave no explanation beyond "personal reasons". William Wallace Burns McInnes was appointed to replace him, in addition to his role as president of the council.

Following the eruption of a scandal involving the improper granting of land, Prior fired the two ministers implicated, David McEwen Eberts and Wilmer Cleveland Wells. McInnes also resigned, on his own volition.
