= Great Seal of British Columbia =

The Great Seal of British Columbia is a seal used to authenticate documents issued by the government of British Columbia that are released in the name of the King in Right, including the appointment of the Executive Council and Ministers (the Cabinet).

The seal was controlled originally held by the Provincial Secretary of British Columbia in 1872 and now by the Provincial Registrar for British Columbia.

== Design ==
In the centre of the Great Seal is the shield from the Coat of Arms of British Columbia. A border surrounds the coat of arms, including the words The Great Seal of the Province of British Columbia - Charles III King of Canada in English only.

== See also ==
- Symbols of British Columbia
