= Vehicle registration plates of British Columbia =

British Columbia
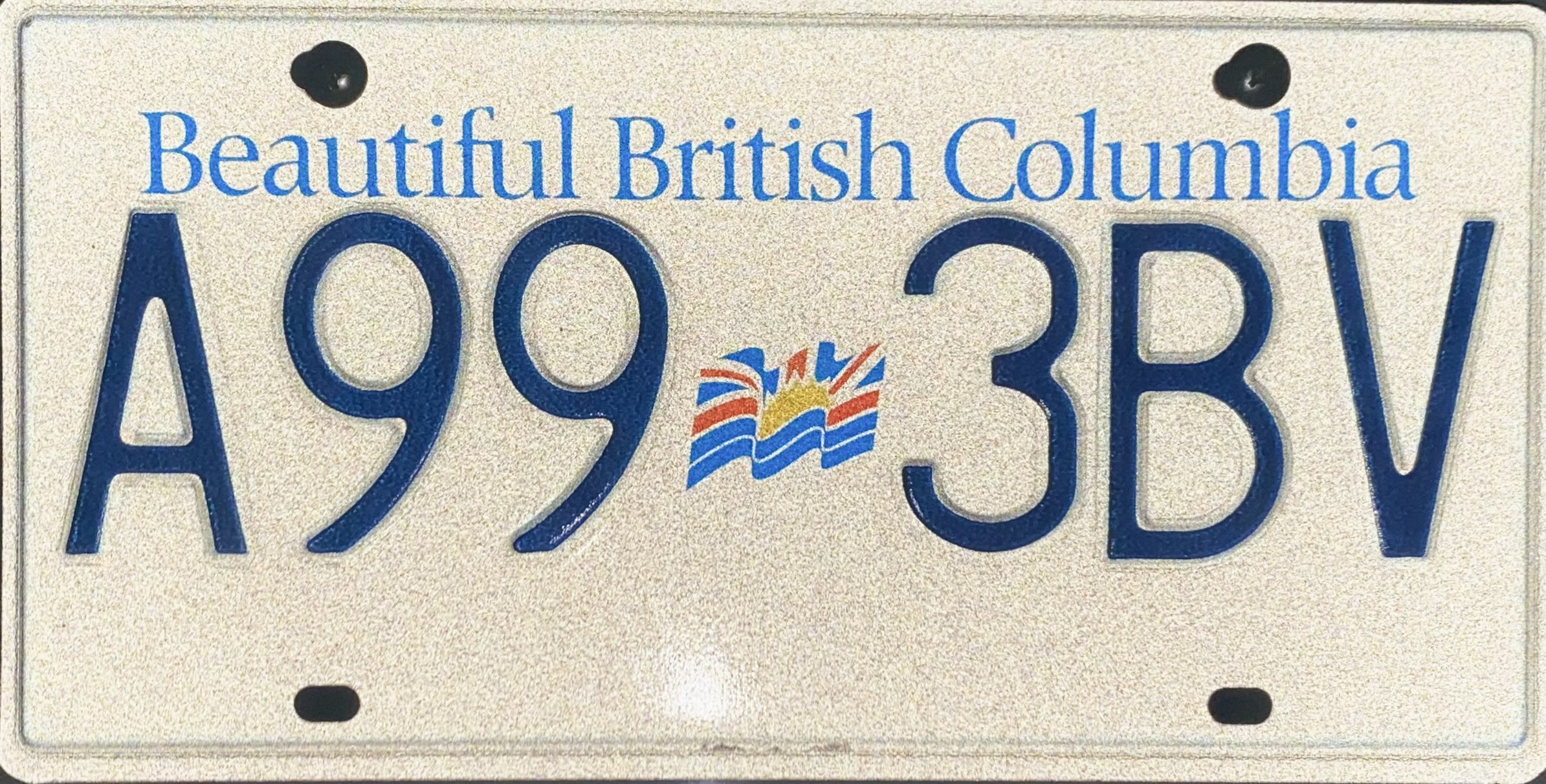

Current series
- Slogan: Beautiful British Columbia
- Size: 12 in × 6 in 30 cm × 15 cm
- Material: Aluminum
- Serial format: A12 3BC
- Introduced: 1985

Availability
- Issued by: Insurance Corporation of British Columbia
- Manufactured by: Waldale Manufacturing Limited, Amherst, Nova Scotia

History
- First issued: January 1913 (pre-provincial plates from February 1904 to December 1912)

The Canadian province of British Columbia first required its residents to register their motor vehicles in 1904. Registrants provided their own licence plates for display until 1913, when the province began to issue plates.

As of 2026, plates are issued by the provincial motor vehicle insurer, the Insurance Corporation of British Columbia (ICBC). Front and rear plates are required for most classes of vehicles, while only rear plates are required for motorcycles and trailers.

== Passenger baseplates ==
=== 1913 to 1969 ===
In 1956, Canada, the United States, and Mexico came to an agreement with the American Association of Motor Vehicle Administrators, the Automobile Manufacturers Association and the National Safety Council that standardized the size for licence plates for vehicles (except those for motorcycles) at 6 inches (15 cm) in height by 12 inches (30 cm) in width, with standardized mounting holes. The 1954 (dated 1955) issue was the first British Columbia licence plate that complied with these standards.

| Image | Dates issued | Design | Slogan | Serial format | Serials issued | Notes |
|---|---|---|---|---|---|---|
| | 1913 | White serial on blue porcelain plate; vertical "B.C." and "1913" at left and right respectively | none | 1234 | 1 to approximately 6900 | |
| | 1914 | Black serial on white porcelain plate; "BC" monogram and "1914" at left | none | 1234 | 1 to approximately 7900 | |
| | 1915 | White serial on green flat metal plate; provincial coat of arms at left with "B.C. 1915" below | none | 1234 | 1 to approximately 7700 | |
| | 1916 | Black serial on yellow flat metal plate; provincial coat of arms at left with "B.C. 1916" below | none | 1234 | 1 to approximately 9400 | |
| | 1917 | Black serial on white flat metal plate; provincial coat of arms at left with "B.C. 1917" below | none | 12345 | 1 to approximately 13000 | |
| | 1918–19 | Embossed yellow serial on black plate with border line; "BC" monogram and "1918" within box at left | none | 12345 | 1 to approximately 22000 | First embossed plate. Revalidated for 1919 with green tabs. |
| | 1920–22 | As 1918–19 base, but without box and with "1920" below monogram | none | 12345 | 1 to approximately 39500 | Revalidated for 1921 with red tabs, and for 1922 with green tabs. |
| | 1923 | Embossed yellow serial on green plate with border line; "BC 1923" at left | none | 12345 | 1 to approximately 38500 | |
| | 1924 | Embossed yellow serial on black plate with border line; "BRITISH COLUMBIA" at bottom and "24" at right | none | 12-345 | 1 to approximately 45-000 | First use of the full province name. |
| | 1925 | Embossed white serial on black plate with border line; "BRITISH COLUMBIA" at bottom and "25" at right | none | 12-345 | 1 to approximately 57-000 | |
| | 1926 | Embossed black serial on white plate with border line; "BRITISH COLUMBIA" at bottom and "26" at right | none | 12-345 | 1 to approximately 69-000 | |
| | 1927 | Embossed black serial on orange plate with border line; "BRITISH COLUMBIA" at bottom and "27" at right | none | 12-345 | 1 to approximately 77-000 | |
| | 1928 | Embossed orange serial on black plate with border line; "BRITISH COLUMBIA" at bottom and "28" at right | none | 12-345 | 1 to approximately 90-000 | |
| | 1929 | Embossed black serial on tan plate with border line; "BRITISH COLUMBIA" at bottom and "29" at right | none | 12-345 | 1 to approximately 99-999 | |
| | 1930 | Embossed yellow serial on red plate with border line; "BRITISH COLUMBIA" at bottom and "30" at right | none | 123-456 | 1 to approximately 103–000 | |
| | 1931 | Embossed black serial on white plate with border line; "BRITISH COLUMBIA" at bottom and "31" at right | none | 123-456 | 1 to approximately 108–000 | |
| | 1932 | Embossed white serial on brown plate with border line; "BRITISH COLUMBIA" at bottom and "32" at right | none | 123-456 | 1 to approximately 120–000 | |
| | 1933 | Embossed brown serial on yellow plate with border line; "BRITISH COLUMBIA" at bottom and "33" at right | none | 12-345 | 1 to approximately 99-000 | |
| | 1934 | Embossed white serial on blue plate with border line; "BRITISH COLUMBIA" at bottom and "34" at right | none | 12-345 | 1 to approximately 96-000 | |
| | 1935 | Embossed blue serial on white plate with border line; "BRITISH COLUMBIA" at bottom and "35" at right | none | 123-456 | 1 to approximately 102–000 | |
| | 1936 | Embossed white serial on green plate with border line; "BRITISH COLUMBIA" at bottom and vertical "36" at right | none | 12-345 | 1 to approximately 89-000 | |
| | 1937 | Embossed black serial on cream plate with border line; "BRITISH COLUMBIA" at bottom and vertical "37" at right | none | 12-345 | 1 to approximately 91-000 | |
| | 1938 | Embossed cream serial on brown plate with border line; "BRITISH COLUMBIA" at bottom and vertical "38" at right | none | 12-345 | 1 to approximately 97-000 | |
| | 1939 | Embossed black serial on yellow plate with border line; "BRITISH COLUMBIA" at bottom and vertical "39" at right | none | 12-345 | 1 to approximately 99-000 | |
| | 1940 | Embossed yellow serial on black plate with border line; "BRITISH COLUMBIA" at bottom and vertical "40" at right | none | 12-345 | 1 to 99-999 | 'A' prefix serials were issued from Vancouver Island, 'B' prefixes from Vancouver, and 'F' prefixes from New Westminster. This practice continued through 1947. |
| | 1940 | Embossed yellow serial on black plate with border line; "BRITISH COLUMBIA" at bottom and vertical "40" at right | none | A1-234 | Coded by branch office (see right) | 'A' prefix serials were issued from Vancouver Island, 'B' prefixes from Vancouver, and 'F' prefixes from New Westminster. This practice continued through 1947. |
| | 1941 | Embossed blue serial on white plate with border line; "BRITISH COLUMBIA" at bottom and vertical "41" at right | none | 12-345 | 1 to 99-999 | |
| | 1941 | Embossed blue serial on white plate with border line; "BRITISH COLUMBIA" at bottom and vertical "41" at right | none | A1-234 | Coded by branch office | |
| | 1942 | Embossed white serial on blue plate with border line; "BRITISH COLUMBIA" at bottom and vertical "42" at right | none | 12-345 | 1 to 99-999 | Produced in pairs but only single plates issued; the remaining plates were restamped and repainted for use in 1943, due to metal conservation for World War II. |
| | 1942 | Embossed white serial on blue plate with border line; "BRITISH COLUMBIA" at bottom and vertical "42" at right | none | A1-234 | Coded by branch office | Produced in pairs but only single plates issued; the remaining plates were restamped and repainted for use in 1943, due to metal conservation for World War II. |
| | 1943 | Embossed black serial on cream plate with border line; "BRITISH COLUMBIA" at bottom and vertical "43" at right | none | 12-345 | 1 to 99-999 | Restamped and repainted 1942 plates. |
| | 1943 | Embossed black serial on cream plate with border line; "BRITISH COLUMBIA" at bottom and vertical "43" at right | none | A1-234 | Coded by branch office | Restamped and repainted 1942 plates. |
| | 1944 | Embossed cream serial on black plate with border line; "BRITISH COLUMBIA" at bottom and vertical "44" at right | none | 12-345 | 1 to 99-999 | |
| | 1944 | Embossed cream serial on black plate with border line; "BRITISH COLUMBIA" at bottom and vertical "44" at right | none | A1-234 | Coded by branch office | |
| | 1945 | Embossed red serial on white plate with border line; "BRITISH COLUMBIA" at bottom and vertical "45" at right | none | 12-345 | 1 to 99-999 | |
| | 1945 | Embossed red serial on white plate with border line; "BRITISH COLUMBIA" at bottom and vertical "45" at right | none | A1-234 | Coded by branch office | |
| | 1946 | Embossed white serial on red plate with border line; "BRITISH COLUMBIA" at bottom and vertical "46" at right | none | 12-345 | 1 to 99-999 | |
| | 1946 | Embossed white serial on red plate with border line; "BRITISH COLUMBIA" at bottom and vertical "46" at right | none | A1-234 | Coded by branch office | |
| | 1947 | Embossed green serial on white plate with border line; "BRITISH COLUMBIA" at bottom and vertical "47" at right | none | 12-345 | 1 to 99-999 | |
| | 1947 | Embossed green serial on white plate with border line; "BRITISH COLUMBIA" at bottom and vertical "47" at right | none | A1-234 | Coded by branch office | |
| | 1948 | Embossed white serial on green plate with border line; "BRITISH COLUMBIA" at bottom and vertical "48" at right | none | 12-345 | 1 to 99-999 | |
| | 1948 | Embossed white serial on green plate with border line; "BRITISH COLUMBIA" at bottom and vertical "48" at right | none | A1-234 | Coded by branch office | |
| | 1949 | Embossed black serial on yellow plate with border line; "BRITISH COLUMBIA" at bottom and vertical "49" at right | none | 123-456 | 1 to approximately 168–000 | |
| | 1950–51 | Embossed yellow serial on black plate with border line; "BRITISH COLUMBIA" at bottom and vertical "50" at right | none | 123-456 | 1 to approximately 237–000 | Revalidated for 1951 with white tabs. |
| | 1952–54 | Embossed black serial on unpainted aluminum plate with border line; embossed totem and maple leaf graphic at right; "BRITISH COLUMBIA" at bottom, offset to left; "52" above graphic | none | 12-345; A1-234; 1A-234; 1-234A | | Revalidated for 1953 with blue tabs, and for 1954 with black tabs. Later plates manufactured without the graphic. |
| | 1955 | Embossed black serial on golden yellow plate with border line; "BRITISH COLUMBIA 55" at bottom | none | 123-456 | 1 to approximately 310–000 | First 6" x 12" plate. |
| | 1956 | Embossed golden yellow serial on black plate with border line; "BRITISH COLUMBIA 56" at bottom | none | 123-456 | 1 to approximately 352–000 | |
| | 1957 | Embossed dark blue serial on white plate with border line; "BRITISH COLUMBIA 57" at bottom | none | 123-456 | 1 to approximately 402–000 | |
| | 1958 | Embossed green serial on gold plate with border line; "BRITISH COLUMBIA" centred at top | "1858 CENTENARY 1958" at bottom | 123-456 | 1 to approximately 421–000 | Commemorated the 100th anniversary of the creation of the Colony of British Columbia. |
| | 1959 | Embossed turquoise serial on maroon plate with border line; "BRITISH COLUMBIA 59" at bottom | none | 123-456 | 1 to approximately 432–000 | |
| | 1960 | Embossed maroon serial on turquoise plate with border line; "BRITISH COLUMBIA 60" at bottom | none | 123-456 | 1 to approximately 453–000 | |
| | 1961 | Embossed maroon serial on pink plate with border line; "BRITISH COLUMBIA 61" at bottom | none | 123-456 | 1 to approximately 471–000 | |
| | 1962 | Embossed pink serial on maroon plate with border line; "BRITISH COLUMBIA 62" at bottom | none | 123-456 | 1 to approximately 509–000 | |
| | 1963 | Embossed white serial on blue plate with border line; "BRITISH COLUMBIA 63" at bottom | none | 123-456 | 1 to approximately 534–000 | |
| | 1964 | Embossed blue serial on white plate with border line; "BRITISH COLUMBIA" centred at bottom; "64" at bottom right | "BEAUTIFUL" centred at top | 123-456 | 1 to approximately 573–000 | First use of the "Beautiful British Columbia" slogan. |
| | 1965 | Embossed white serial on blue plate with border line; "BRITISH COLUMBIA" centred at bottom; "65" at top right | "BEAUTIFUL" centred at top | 123-456 | 1 to approximately 630–000 | |
| | 1966 | Embossed blue serial on white plate with border line; "BRITISH COLUMBIA" centred at bottom; "66" at top right | "BEAUTIFUL" centred at top | 123-456 | 1 to approximately 674–000 | |
| | 1967 | Embossed red serial on white plate with border line; "BRITISH COLUMBIA" centred at bottom; "67" at top right | "BEAUTIFUL" centred at top | 123-456 | 1 to approximately 720–000 | Colours chosen to commemorate the centennial of Canadian Confederation. |
| | 1968 | Embossed blue serial on white plate with border line; "BRITISH COLUMBIA" centred at bottom; "19" at top left and "68" at top right | "BEAUTIFUL" centred at top | 123-456 | 1 to approximately 762–000 | |
| | 1969 | Embossed white serial on blue plate with border line; "BRITISH COLUMBIA" centred at bottom; "19" at top left and "69" at top right | "BEAUTIFUL" centred at top | 123-456 | 1 to approximately 805–000 | |

=== 1970 to present ===
British Columbia introduced an ABC-123 serial format on its passenger plates in 1970. A split-alphabet system was used, with each letter advancing from A through K, or from L through X (the letters I, O, Q, U, Y and Z were omitted). Serials were thus issued in the following eight series: AAA–KKJ, AAL–KKX, ALA–KXK, ALL–KXX, LAA–XKK, LAL–XKX, LLA–XXK and LLL–XXX. When the ABC-123 format was exhausted in 2001, a reversed format, 123-ABC, was introduced, with the same split-alphabet system and thus the same eight series. Upon the exhaustion of this format in 2014, an AB1-23C format was introduced, with the split-alphabet system discontinued and each letter thus advancing from A through X. In 2025, another format, A12-3BC was introduced, with a new alphabet system which allows the letters U, Y, and Z to be used (with the letters I, O, and Q still omitted).

| Image | Dates issued | Design | Slogan | Serial format | Serials issued | Notes |
|---|---|---|---|---|---|---|
| | 1970–72 | Blue on white | Beautiful British Columbia | ABC-123 | AAA-000 to KKJ-999; KLL-000 to KXX-999 | Validated each year with stickers. |
| | 1973–78 | Blue on white | Beautiful British Columbia | ABC 123 | LAA 000 to XKK 999; LLA 000 to XXK 999; LLL 000 to PXX 999 | Later plates manufactured in Quebec using that province's serial dies. |
| | 1979–85 | White on blue | Beautiful British Columbia | ABC-123 | AAA-000 to KKJ-999; AAL-000 to KKX-999; ALL-000 to KXX-999; ALA-000 to BRB-999 | Early plates manufactured in Quebec. |
| | 1985–2001 | Blue on reflective white with screened stylized provincial flag in centre | Beautiful British Columbia | ABC 123 | LAA 000 to XXX 999 | |
| | 2001– August 2014 | Blue on reflective white with screened stylized provincial flag in centre | Beautiful British Columbia | 123 ABC | 000 AAA to 999 XXX; 000 MJG to 999 MXX | 'M' series of serials initially reserved for 2010 Winter Olympics plates; unused serials were issued on the standard base in mid-2014 following 999 XXX. 'V' series reserved for Veteran plates. Numbers 400 through 499 omitted from serials starting in 2008, due to problems surrounding the number 4 among the province's Chinese population. |
| | August 2014 –August 2025 | Blue on reflective white with screened stylized provincial flag in centre | Beautiful British Columbia | AB1 23C | AA0 00A to NX9 99X; SA0 00A to XX9 99X | Serials PA0 00A through RX9 99X reserved for BC Parks plates. |
| | August 2025 –present | Blue on reflective white with screened stylized provincial flag in centre | Beautiful British Columbia | A12 3BC | A00 0AA to B69 9CA(as of August 31, 2026) | Letters U, Y and Z added back to serials. Serials P00 0AA through S99 9ZZ reserved for BC Parks plates. |

== Truck plates 1973 to present ==
The current standard truck plate is issued to both commercial and private trucks, and also to buses and taxis.

| Image | First issued | Design | Slogan | Serial format | Serials issued | Notes |
|---|---|---|---|---|---|---|
| | 1973 | Black on white | Beautiful British Columbia | 123-456 | 500-001 to 999-999 | |
| | 1976 | Orange on white | Beautiful British Columbia | 12-34-AB | 00-00-AA to approximately 25-00-DS | Letters I, O, Q, U, Y, and Z not used in serials; this practice continues today, with some letters reintroduced in 2026. |
| | 1979 | Green on white | Beautiful British Columbia | 12-34-AB | 00-00-FA to approximately 10-00-LY | |
| | 1985 | Blue on reflective white with screened stylized provincial flag used as separator | Beautiful British Columbia | 1234 AB | 0000 MB to 9999 YY; 0000 AA to approximately 9999 LR | |
| | 2008 | Blue on reflective white with screened stylized provincial flag used as separator | Beautiful British Columbia | AB 1234 | AL 0000 to YB 4451 (as of August 10, 2026) | |
| | 2026 | Blue on reflective white with screened stylized provincial flag used as separator | Beautiful British Columbia | 1AB 234 | ? | U, Y, and Z reintroduced to the pool of possible combinations in serials |

== Non-passenger plates ==
=== Motorcycle plates ===
| Image | First issued | Design | Slogan | Serial format | Serials issued | Notes |
|---|---|---|---|---|---|---|
| | 1974-78 | Orange on white plate, "B.C." in top left corner; "MOTORCYCLE" screened at bottom centre. | none | 123456 | | |
| | 1979-85 | White on blue, "B.C." in top left corner; "MOTORCYCLE" screened at bottom centre. | none | A12-345 | | |
| | 1985 | Blue on reflective white with screened stylized provincial flag in centre | Beautiful British Columbia | N1-2345 | J6-7000 to E9-9999; K4-2000 to S3-9999 | |
| | 2021 | Blue on reflective white with "M.C." in bottom left corner; BC sun logo in bottom right corner. | Beautiful British Columbia | N12345 1234A5 | S59000 to J66999; 0000A0 to 4225B2 (As of July 9, 2026) | |

=== Antique plates ===
| Image | Dates issued | Design | Slogan | Serial format | Serials issued | Notes |
|---|---|---|---|---|---|---|
| | 1966-72 | Black serial on white plate; "VINTAGE" screened at top | BRITISH COLUMBIA | 123 | | |
| | 1972-74 | Black serial on white plate; "VINTAGE" screened at top | BRITISH COLUMBIA | 1; 12 | | |
| | 1974–present | Black serial on white plate; "VINTAGE" screened at top | BRITISH COLUMBIA | 1234 | 1001 to present | Issued to vehicles 25 years old or older, or 15 years old or older and of a limited production run. |

=== Other non-passenger ===
| Image | Type | First issued | Design | Slogan | Serial format | Serials issued | Notes |
|---|---|---|---|---|---|---|---|
| | Amateur radio | 1985 | White background with blue text (identical to standard passenger plates) | Beautiful British Columbia | VE7AB; VE7ABC; VA7ABC | VE7AA to VE7ZZ; VE7AAA to VE7ZZZ; VA7AAA to VA7ZZZ | Available to holders of a valid amateur radio licence. |
| | Collector | 1990 | White background with black text | none | B12 345; 1M2-345 | B00-001 to B39-999; 0M0-000 to 9M9-999 | New serial format introduced in 2020. |
| | Dealer | 1985 | Blue on reflective white with screened stylized provincial flag used as separator; DEMONSTRATION screened in blue at top. | none | D1 2345 | D0-0000 to D9-9999 | |
| BC Repairer license plate ☢ | Repair | | Blue on reflective white with screened stylized provincial flag used as separator; REPAIRER screened in blue at top. | none | R1 2345 | R0-0000 to R9-9999 | |
| | Transporter | | Blue on reflective white with screened stylized provincial flag used as separator; TRANSPORTER screened in blue at top. | none | TR 1234 | TR 0000 to TY 9999 | |
| | Manufacturer | | Blue on reflective white with screened stylized provincial flag used as separator; MANUFACTURER screened in blue at top. | none | MA 1234 | MA 0000 to MA 9999 | |
| | Prorated | | Blue on reflective white with screened stylized provincial flag used as separator; APPORTIONED screened in blue at top. | none | P1 2345 1234 5P 1234 P5 | P0 0000 to P9 9999; 0000 0P to 9999 9P; 0000 P0 to 0014 P1 (As of June 4, 2026) | |
| | Commercial Trailer | | Blue on reflective white with screened stylized provincial flag used as separator. | Beautiful British Columbia | 1234 5B | 0000 0V to 5999 9L; 0000 0Y to 2499 9Y; 6000 0L to 6383 6L (As of June 25, 2026) | |
| | Trailer | | Blue on reflective white with screened stylized provincial flag used as separator; TRAILER screened in blue at top (2015) | Beautiful British Columbia (1985 to 2015) | 123 456 UBC 12D WBC 12D | 000 001 to 999 999; UAA 00A to UYY 99Y; WAA 00A to WXV 00G (As of June 1, 2026) | |

== Consular plates 1967 to present ==
| Image | First issued | Design | Slogan | Notes | Serial format | Serials issued |
|---|---|---|---|---|---|---|
| | 1967 | The first year diplomat plates are issued with date stamped plates changing yearly from red-on-white, blue-on-white, and white-on-blue. | Beautiful British Columbia | Date stamped from 1967 to 1972 | CONSUL 123 | |
| | 1973 | The first year for decals, small decals, in the blue-on-white colour scheme. | Beautiful British Columbia | Small decal from 1973 to 1978 | CONSUL 123 | 101-500 501–600 |
| | 1979 | The first year for large decals, in the white-on-blue colour scheme. | Beautiful British Columbia | Large decal from 1979 to 1985 | CONSUL 123 | 002-100 601–999 |
| | 1986 | The first year of the "flag graphic" plates with the blue-on-white colour scheme. | Beautiful British Columbia | Flag graphic | CONSUL 123 | 101-500 501–999 |
| | 2001 | Continuation of the flag graphic with a change of serial format | Beautiful British Columbia | Flag graphic | CONSUL A12 | A01-D99* *Unconfirmed |
| | 2007 | Red background with white writing and rising sun logo; created by ICBC and the Department of Foreign Affairs in Ottawa | none | Diplomat-level Representative - Includes dependents or International Organizations | DL 123A | |
| | 2007 | Red background with white writing and rising sun logo; created by ICBC and the Department of Foreign Affairs in Ottawa | none | Career Consular Officers - Includes level foreign representatives and their dependents or Consular Post where headed by a Career Officer | CC 123A | |
| | 2007 | Red background with white writing and rising sun logo; created by ICBC and the Department of Foreign Affairs in Ottawa | none | Honorary Consular Officers - Includes Canadian citizens, level foreign representatives or a Consular Post where headed by Honorary Consular | HC 123A | |
| | 2007 | Red background with white writing and rising sun logo; created by ICBC and the Department of Foreign Affairs in Ottawa | none | Consular Staff - Includes administrative, technical and service level foreign representatives and their dependents | CS 123A | |
| | 2007 | Red background with white writing and rising sun logo; created by ICBC and the Department of Foreign Affairs in Ottawa | none | Special Representative - Includes foreign officials and their dependents from Offices of Political Subdivisions of Foreign State and from other Office and for their Offices | SR 123A | |

== Specialty plates ==
=== 2010 Olympics ===
| Image | Type | First issued | Design | Slogan | Serial format | Serials issued | Notes |
|---|---|---|---|---|---|---|---|
| | Passenger | 2007 | Screened mountain design background with black lettering and the 2010 Winter Olympics logo in the centre | The Best Place On Earth | 123 MBC | 000 MAA to 999 MJF | Issued from April 16, 2007, to December 31, 2010. Surcharge supported Canada's Winter Olympic team. |
| | Truck | 2007 | Screened mountain design background with black lettering and the 2010 Winter Olympics logo in the centre | The Best Place On Earth | AB 1234 | AA 0000 to approximately AF 2500 | Issued from April 16, 2007, to December 31, 2010. Surcharge supported Canada's Winter Olympic team. |
| | Farm Truck | 2007 | Screened mountain design background with black lettering and the 2010 Winter Olympics logo in the centre | The Best Place On Earth | G1 2345 | G9 0000 to G9 9999 | Issued from April 16, 2007, to December 31, 2010. Surcharge supported Canada's Winter Olympic team. |
| | Commercial Trailer | 2007 | Screened mountain design background with black lettering and the 2010 Winter Olympics logo in the centre | The Best Place On Earth | 1234 5U | 0000 0U to 9999 9U | Issued from April 16, 2007, to December 31, 2010. Surcharge supported Canada's Winter Olympic team. |
| | Trailer | 2007 | Screened mountain design background with black lettering and the 2010 Winter Olympics logo in the centre | The Best Place On Earth | UYM 12A | UYM 00A to UYM 99G | Issued from April 16, 2007, to December 31, 2010. Surcharge supported Canada's Winter Olympic team. |
| | Motorcycle | 2007 | Screened mountain design background with black lettering and the 2010 Winter Olympics logo in the centre | The Best Place On Earth | V1 2345 | V2 0000 to V2 9999 | Issued from April 16, 2007, to December 31, 2010. Surcharge supported Canada's Winter Olympic team. |

=== BC Parks plates ===
On November 28, 2016, British Columbia announced its new BC Parks Future Strategy. This included the issuance by the ICBC of special licence plates, with the proceeds going towards preserving BC Parks. The three new plates were unveiled by the ICBC on January 18, 2017, and went on sale January 29, 2017, through the Autoplan broker network. Each plate costs $50 for the initial purchase, of which $33 goes towards funding BC Parks; thereafter, there is an annual renewal fee of $40, all of which goes towards funding the parks system. In less than eight weeks since going on sale, it was reported that 10,000 BC Parks plates had been sold; this included all three designs.

| Image | First issued | Design | Slogan | Serial format | Serials issued | Notes |
|---|---|---|---|---|---|---|
| | 2017 | An image of a Kermode Bear as the background with black lettering. The Kermode Bear is also a provincial symbol. It is a white black bear subspecies; it is not albino. | Beautiful British Columbia | PB123C; RL123C | PA000A to PJ999X, RK000A to RN999X | Secondary slogan of "Discover BC Parks" |
| | 2017 | An image of the Purcell Mountains with the snow-capped peaks as the background with black lettering. | Beautiful British Columbia | PL123C; RR123C | PK000A to PV999X, RP000A to RX999X | Secondary slogan of "Discover BC Parks" |
| | 2017 | An image of Porteau Cove overlooking Howe Sound as a background with black lettering. | Beautiful British Columbia | PX123C; RB123C | PW000A to PX999X; RA000A to RJ999X | Secondary slogan of "Discover BC Parks" |
| | June 2025 | An image of Porteau Cove overlooking Howe Sound as a background with black lettering. | Beautiful British Columbia | S123BC | S000AA to S999ZZ | Secondary slogan of "Discover BC Parks" |

=== Military plates ===
| Image | Type | First issued | Design | Slogan | Serial format | Serials issued | Notes |
|---|---|---|---|---|---|---|---|
| | Veteran passenger | June 6, 2004 | Powder blue background with black lettering, the national flag at the upper right, and a partial image of the national war memorial in Ottawa on the left side with a red poppy overlaid | VETERAN | 123VBC | 000VAA to 879VCN (as of July 30, 2026) | Issued to veterans who must be confirmed by one of the Veterans associations recognized by the provincial government. |
| | Veteran truck | June 6, 2004 | Powder blue background with black lettering, the national flag at the upper right, and a partial image of the national war memorial in Ottawa on the left side with a red poppy overlaid | VETERAN | 1234LV | 0000LV to 9999LT | Issued to veterans who must be confirmed by one of the Veterans associations recognized by the provincial government. |
| | Veteran motorcycle | | Powder blue background with black lettering, the national flag at the upper right, and a partial image of the national war memorial in Ottawa on the left side with a red poppy overlaid | VETERAN | V12345 | V00001 to V04790 (as of May 2, 2026) | Issued to veterans who must be confirmed by one of the Veterans associations recognized by the provincial government. |
| | Memorial Cross recipient | 2016 | White background with purple writing, the national flag at the upper right, and an image of the memorial cross on the left side | Memorial Cross Recipient | MC123R MC1234 | MC000R to MC999R MC0000 to MC9999 | As of November 10, 2016, this plate is issued to recipients of the Memorial Cross. They can only be obtained by contacting the Manager of Provincial Vehicle Registration & Licensing at ICBC headquarters. |

== Decals ==
From 1970 until May 1, 2022, British Columbia required motorists to place a decal on the rear licence plate as proof of registration.

Initially, all decals expired on February 28 of the following year. When monthly staggered registration commenced in 1979, longer decals were introduced displaying the month of expiration; all such decals initially expired at the end of the month displayed. Daily registration commenced in 1993, with an additional decal introduced displaying the number of the day on which the month decal expired.

The decals were issued by the ICBC until the requirement was removed on May 1, 2022. Some decals may have been unofficially handed out by autoplan agents after May 2022. The following are the colour patterns used in the years from 1980 to 2022:

| Image | Year | Colour |
|---|---|---|
| | 1980 | Black and white |
| | 1981 | Red and black |
| | 1982 | Green and white |
| | 1983 | Black and white |
| | 1984 | Orange and white |
| | 1985 | Blue and white |
| | 1986 | Red and blue on white (Expo 86 Logo) |
| | 1987 | Red and white |
| | 1988 | Dark blue and white |
| | 1989 | Green on white (thick border) |
| | 1990 | Pink on white |
| | 1991 | Blue on white |
| | 1992 | Black on white |
| | 1993 | Green on white |
| | 1994 | Red on white |
| | 1995 | Blue on white |
| | 1996 | Black on white (Jan-Sep) |
| | 1996 | Pink on white (Oct-Dec) |
| | 1997 | Green on white |
| | 1998 | Red on white |
| | 1999 | Blue on white (thick or thin border) |
| | 2000 | Black on yellow |
| | 2001 | Black on orange |
| | 2002 | Black on dark green |
| | 2003 | Black on pink |
| | 2004 | Black on yellow (no border, long decal) |
| | 2005 | Black on sky blue (no border, short decal) |
| | 2006 | Black on red |
| | 2007 | Black on light green |
| | 2008 | White on baby blue |
| | 2009 | Black on dark orange |
| | 2010 | Black on green |
| | 2011 | Black on yellow |
| | 2012 | Black on pink |
| | 2013 | Black on orange |
| | 2014 | Black on baby blue (full year shown) |
| | 2015 | Black on mustard yellow |
| | 2016 | Black on pink |
| | 2017 | Black on green |
| | 2018 | Black on orange |
| | 2019 | Black on yellow |
| | 2020 | Black on yellow |
| | 2021 | Black on pink |
| | 2022 | Black on green |
| | 2023 | Black on Orange Somewhat rare but issued until Apr 30 2022 for renewals expiring in 2023 |

== See also ==
- Insurance Corporation of British Columbia (ICBC)
- Symbols of British Columbia
