= Flag of British Columbia =

Canadian provincial flag

British Columbia
- Use: Civil and state flag
- Proportion: 3:5
- Adopted: June 14, 1960; 66 years ago
- Design: A white banner with a Union Jack on the top third modified with a golden crown and three wavy blue lines on the bottom, all under a setting golden half-sun on the bottom.

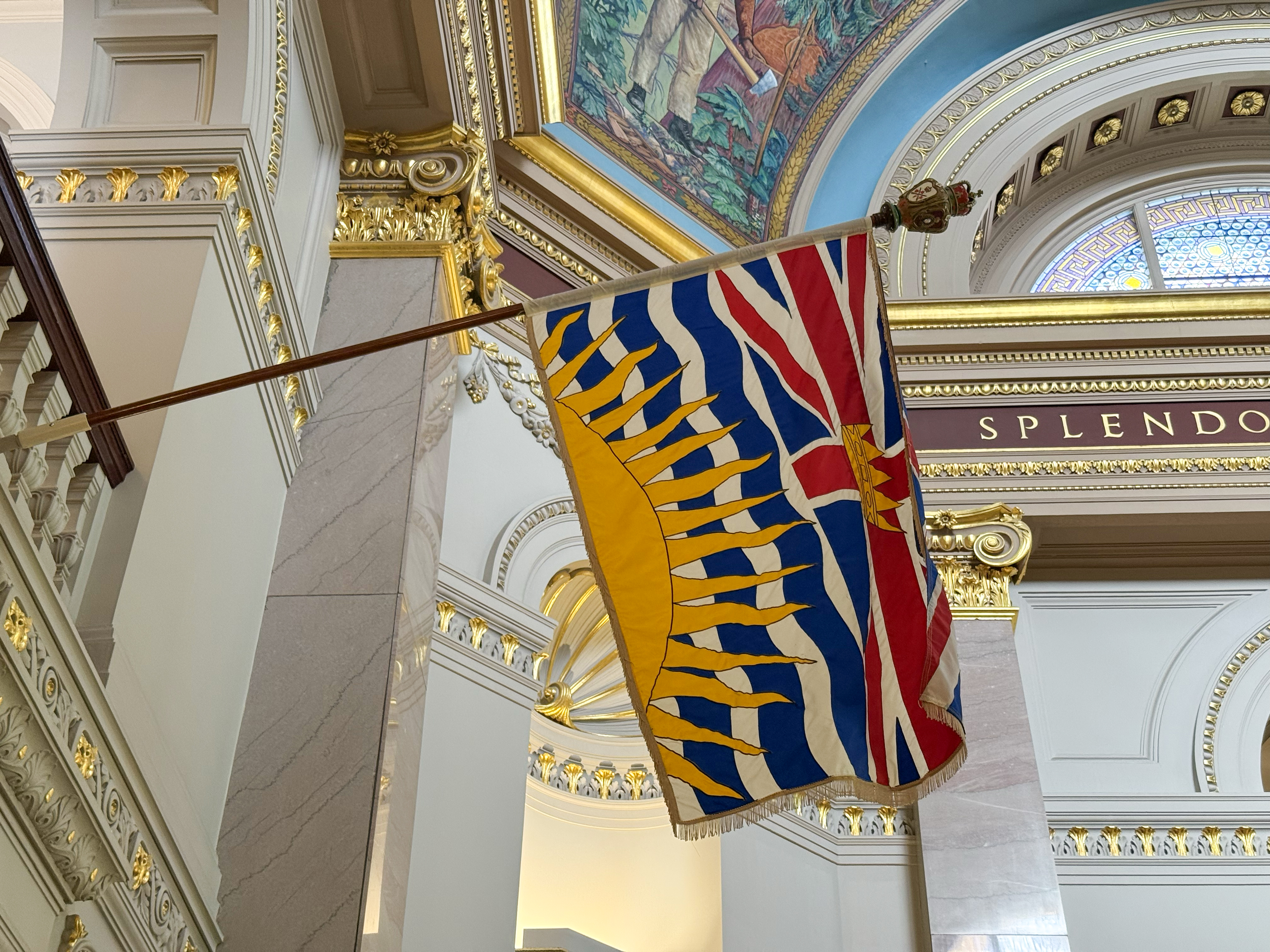
The flag in the British Columbia Legislative Buildings

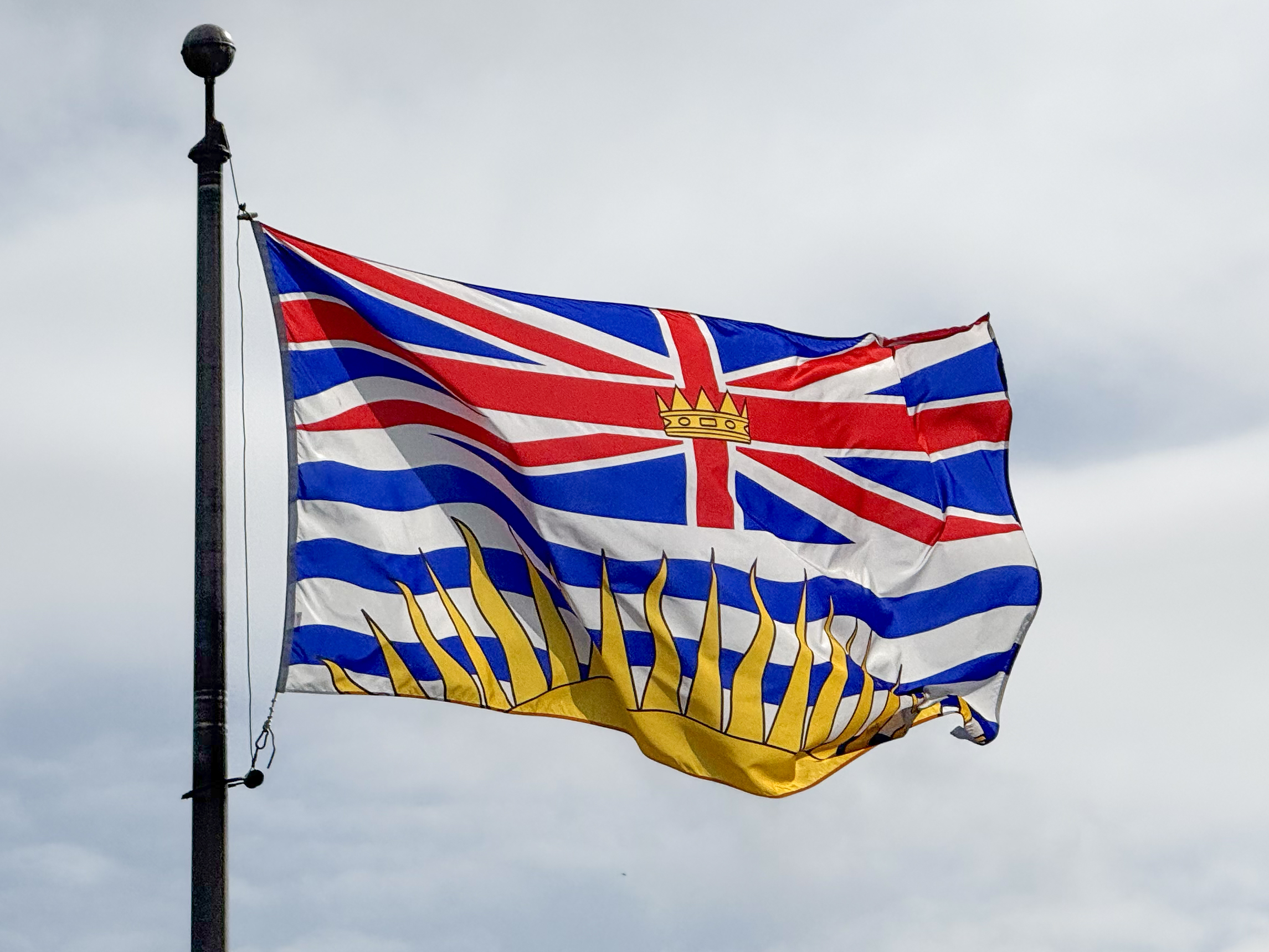
The flag flying in Victoria

The flag of British Columbia is based upon the shield of the provincial arms of British Columbia. At the top of the flag is a rendition of the Royal Union Flag, defaced in the centre by a crown, while the bottom of the flag features a setting sun over stylized waves, representing British Columbia's connection to the Pacific Ocean and its westernmost location in Canada.

== History ==
The flag of British Columbia is based upon the 1906 arms of the province, designed by Arthur John Beanlands, a canon of Christ Church Cathedral in Victoria. Originally, the arms featured the Union Jack on the bottom, but this was reversed by request of the College of Arms in London. Based upon Beanlands' revised design, the flag of British Columbia was introduced on June 14, 1960, by Premier W. A. C. Bennett, and was first flown on board the BC Ferries motor vessel Sidney (later Queen of Sidney).

== Design ==
The four wavy white and three wavy blue lines symbolize the province's location between the Pacific Ocean and the Rocky Mountains. The setting sun represents the fact that British Columbia is Canada's westernmost province. The image of the continuously rising sun refers to the provincial motto splendor sine occasu (Latin for 'splendour without diminishment"'). The Union Flag on top reflects the province's British heritage, while the crown in the centre represents British Columbia becoming a Crown colony and achieving responsible government. The flag has an aspect ratio of 3:5.

A stylized version of the flag that appears on British Columbia licence plates incorrectly features the setting sun overlapping the Union Flag instead of the waves.

The flag of British Columbia is similar to the flag of the British Indian Ocean Territory. It also bears similarities to the arms of Suffolk County Council, the local authority of the county of Suffolk in the United Kingdom, as well as the flag of Kiribati, which features the blue waves for the Pacific Ocean and a sun for its own reasons.

== Gallery ==
Standard of the lieutenant governor of British Columbia

Standard of the lieutenant governor of British Columbia (1906–1982)

Standard of the lieutenant governor of British Columbia (1871–1906)

Standard of the governor of British Columbia (1870–1871)

Flag of Franco-Columbians

Unofficial flag of Vancouver Island (created in 1988 based on 19th-century design principles)

== See also ==
- List of Canadian provincial and territorial symbols
- Symbols of British Columbia
