= Symbols of British Columbia =

Symbols of Canadian province

British Columbia is Canada's westernmost province, and has established several provincial symbols.

== Official symbols ==
	Symbol	Image	Adopted	Remarks
Coat of arms	Coat of arms of British Columbia	Coat of arms of British Columbia	October 15, 1987	Granted by Her Majesty Queen Elizabeth II
Motto	Splendor sine occasu Splendour without diminishment		October 15, 1987	Granted with other elements of the coat of arms by Queen Elizabeth II
Shield of arms	Shield of arms of British Columbia		1906	Granted by King Edward VII. The shield can be found on the BC coat of arms, on highway route markers, and on the insignia of the British Columbia Conservation Officer Service. They are almost the same, the only difference being the number of sun rays.
Flag	Flag of British Columbia	Flag of British Columbia	1960	Duplicates the design of the shield of arms of British Columbia
Legislative coat of arms/logo	The Legislative Assembly of British Columbia coat of arms or logo			
Great Seal	The Great Seal of the Province of British Columbia	Link		Great Seal of British Columbia, entrusted by the Lieutenant Governor of British Columbia to the Attorney General of British Columbia
Emblem of the lieutenant governor	Emblem of the lieutenant governor of British Columbia			
Standard of the lieutenant governor	Standard of the lieutenant governor of British Columbia			Duplicated the design of the emblem of the lieutenant governor
Flower	Pacific dogwood (Cornus nuttalli)	Pacific dogwood	1956	
Mammal	Spirit bear (Ursus americanus kermodei)	Spirit bear	April 2006	Also called Kermode bear
Bird	Steller's jay (Cyanocitta stelleri)	Steller's jay	December 17, 1987	Voted by the people of British Columbia
Fish	Pacific salmon	Pacific salmon	February 2013	
Tree	Western redcedar (Thuja plicata donn)	Western redcedar	February 1988	Western red cedar is a valuable economic resource of the province
Gemstone	Jade	Jade	1968	Jade is mined in many parts of British Columbia
Tartan	Blue, white, green, red and gold		1974	Symbolising the ocean, dogwood, forests, the maple leaf and sun on the shield and flag
Fossil	Traskasaura	Traskasaura	2023	Adopted into the Provincial Symbols and Honours Act. Symbolizing British Columbia's "diverse natural history"

== Other symbols ==
	Symbol	Image	Adopted	Remarks
Provincial Government Social Media Symbol (current)	Rising Sun Logo		2017	This symbol is the current logo used by the Province of British Columbia for provincial social media accounts and still has the rising sun, but instead of saying "British Columbia" under the rising sun, it has been changed to only say "BC" and also removed the yellow underline that the previous versions had.
Provincial Government Symbol (current)	Rising Sun Logo	British Columbia wordmark	2011	This symbol is the current logo used by the Province of British Columbia and is identical to the logo it replaced, but without the slogan "The Best Place on Earth." It still includes the words "British Columbia" on top of a yellow underline.
Provincial Government Symbol	Rising Sun Logo - "The Best Place on Earth" slogan		2005	This version of the symbol has the rising sun on top of the words "British Columbia" on top of a yellow underline on top of the slogan "The Best Place on Earth." It was used by British Columbia from 2005 to 2011. David Greer, communications director with the Ministry of Labour, Citizens' Services and Open Government said "The change in leadership signalled a change in how government brands its products and materials... It's not going to be destroyed. It's just not being replaced."[1]
Provincial Government Symbol	"Spirit of BC" (Flag Graphic)		1983	This was the logo of the Government of BC from 1983 to 2003. It was a stylized graphic of the flag of British Columbia. This symbol remains in some limited use, such as on current standard vehicle registration plates of British Columbia, and on the vehicles of the British Columbia Sheriff Service.
Building	British Columbia Parliament Buildings		1897	It is the seat of the Legislative Assembly of British Columbia
Highway Route Marker				Used to denote the route number for provincial highways for the British Columbia Ministry of Transportation.
