= Robert McKechnie =

Canadian physician (1861–1944)

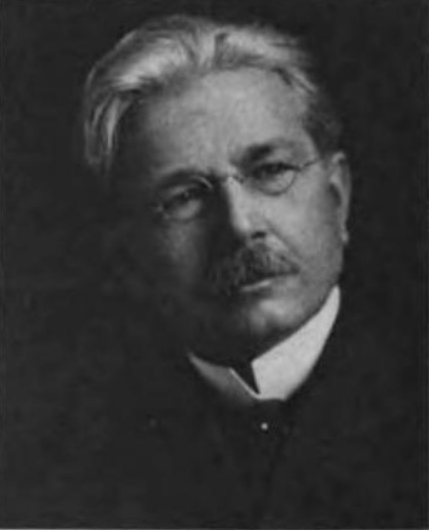

Member of the Legislative Assembly of British Columbia
- In office 1898–1899
- Constituency: Nanaimo

Personal details
- Born: Robert Edward McKechnie; April 25, 1861 Brockville, Canada West
- Died: May 24, 1944 (aged 83) Vancouver, British Columbia
- Education: McGill University
- Occupation: Physician, chancellor, politician
- Awards: King George V Silver Jubilee Medal; Commander of the Order of the British Empire

Dr. Robert Edward McKechnie (April 25, 1861 – May 24, 1944) was a physician and the second chancellor of the University of British Columbia.

== Early life ==
McKechnie was born in Brockville, Canada West, on April 25, 1861. After completing his secondary school education in Charlottetown, Prince Edward Island, he began his studies at McGill University in 1886. After receiving his medical degree from McGill in 1890, he moved to British Columbia the following year, and practiced medicine in the Nanaimo area for 10 years. He was later elected to the Council of the College of Physicians and Surgeons of British Columbia in 1896, and served as its president in 1897, 1906, and 1910. McKechnie also held the positions of senior surgeon, member of the Board of Directors, and Life Governor at Vancouver General Hospital. He was elected the first president of the British Columbia Medical Association in 1899. He later moved to Vancouver in 1904, where he remained for the rest of his career.

He helped found the American College of Surgeons and the North Pacific Surgical Society, and was president of the Canadian Medical Association in both 1914 and 1920. In addition to his medical career, McKechnie also ventured into politics. He was elected the Member of the Legislative Assembly for Nanaimo in 1898, and served as a Minister without portfolio in the provincial government of Premier Charles Augustus Semlin.

== University of British Columbia ==
He lectured in medical history at the University of British Columbia before being elected to its senate in 1912 and becoming its second chancellor in 1918, holding the latter position until his death in 1944. He was the university's longest-serving chancellor, serving for 26 years. During this time, he wrote several articles for medical journals, published a book about the history of medicine on the Northwest Coast, and started the British Columbia Place Names project.

== Death and legacy ==
McKechnie was awarded the Honour of "Prince of Good Fellows" by the Vancouver Medical Association in 1928. Becoming a charter member of the Royal College of Surgeons of Canada in 1931, he presented later that year the Osler Lecture in Vancouver.

McKechnie received several accolades, including honorary degrees from McGill University in 1912 and the University of British Columbia in 1925, the King George V Silver Jubilee Medal for services to Canada, and was later made Commander of the Order of the British Empire. He died on May 24, 1944, in Vancouver. McKechnie's death from a hand infection was reported on the front page of the Vancouver Sun. An elementary school named in his honor, the Dr. R. E. McKechnie Elementary School, was opened by Dr. Wallace Wilson on November 22, 1957.
