= Smith Curtis =

Canadian politician (1855–1949)

Smith Curtis (November 16, 1855 – August 28, 1949) was a lawyer and political figure. He represented West Kootenay-Rossland in the Legislative Assembly of British Columbia, Canada, from 1900 to 1903. Although not a candidate in the 1903 provincial election, he ran unsuccessfully for a second term in the Legislature, as a Liberal, in the 1907 provincial election.

He was born in Leeds township, Leeds County, Ontario, the son of Northrup Curtis, and was educated in Ontario. Curtis was called to the Manitoba bar in 1885 and to the British Columbia bar in 1886. He later became involved in mining. In 1890, he married Lily E. Mills. Curtis practised law in Portage la Prairie, Manitoba in partnership with Joseph Martin. In 1886, he served on the town council for Portage la Prairie. Curtis served in the short-lived Martin cabinet of 1900 as Minister of Mines (February 28 to June 14, 1900) and as Minister of Finance and Agriculture (March 1 to April 3, 1900), even though he did not hold a seat in the assembly at the time. He died in Kamloops.
