= Monarchy in British Columbia =

Function of the Canadian monarchy in British Columbia

King in Right of British Columbia
- Provincial
- Arms of His Majesty the King in Right of British Columbia

Incumbent
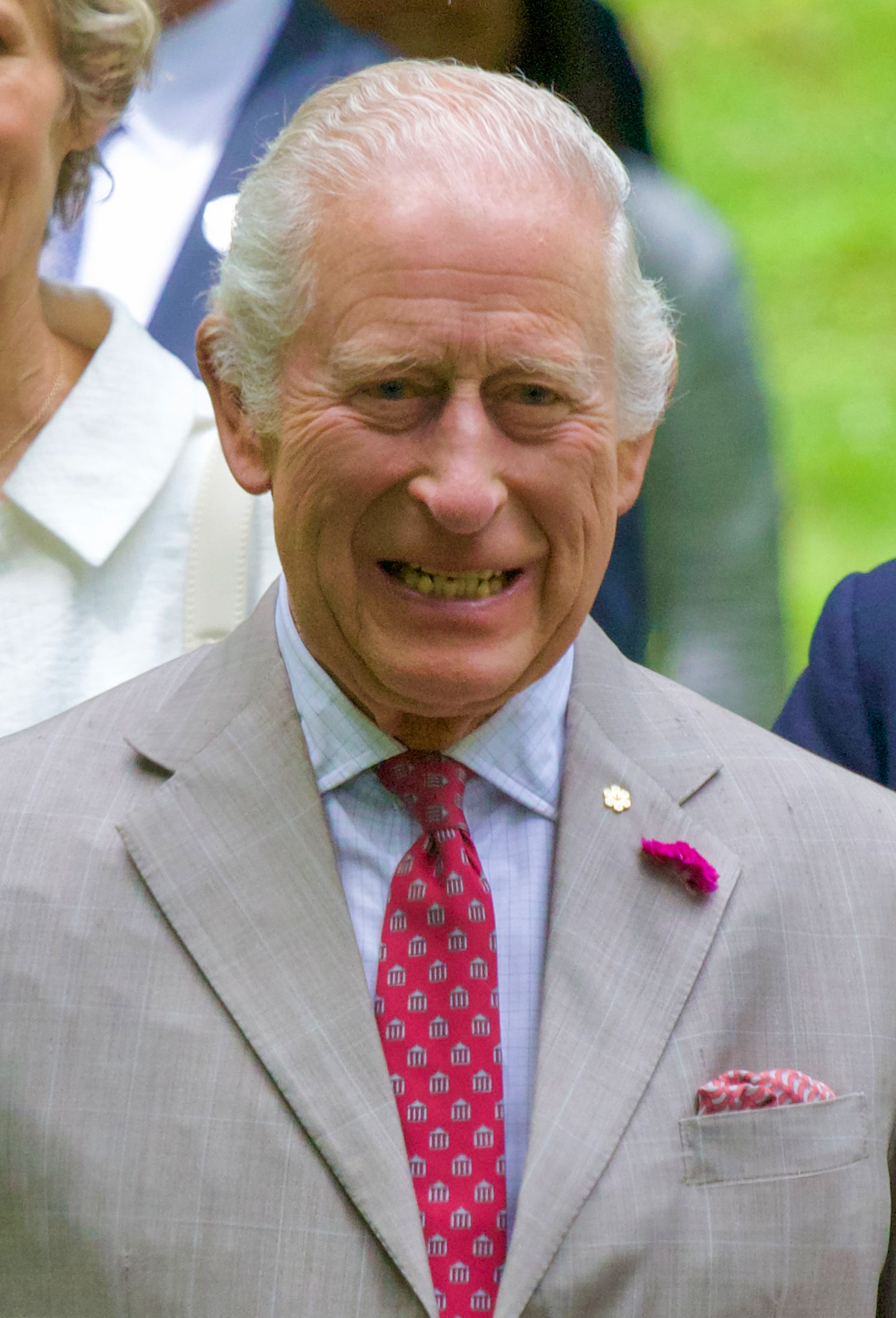
- Charles III; King of Canada since 8 September 2022

Details
- Style: His Majesty
- Represented by: The lieutenant governor of British Columbia
- First monarch: Victoria
- Formed: 20 July 1871
- Residence: Government House

By the arrangements of the Canadian federation, Canada's monarchy operates in British Columbia as the core of the province's Westminster-style parliamentary democracy. As such, the Crown within British Columbia's jurisdiction is referred to as the Crown in Right of British Columbia, His Majesty in Right of British Columbia, or the King in Right of British Columbia. The Constitution Act, 1867, however, leaves many royal duties in British Columbia specifically assigned to the sovereign's viceroy, the Lieutenant Governor of British Columbia, whose direct participation in governance is limited by the conventional stipulations of constitutional monarchy.

== Constitutional role ==
The role of the Crown is both legal and practical; it functions in British Columbia in the same way it does in all of Canada's other provinces, being the centre of a constitutional construct in which the institutions of government acting under the sovereign's authority share the power of the whole. It is thus the foundation of the executive, legislative, and judicial branches of the province's government. The Canadian monarch—since 8 September 2022, King Charles III—is represented and his duties carried out by the Lieutenant Governor of British Columbia, whose direct participation in governance is limited by the conventional stipulations of constitutional monarchy, with most related powers entrusted for exercise by the elected parliamentarians, the ministers of the Crown generally drawn from amongst them, and the judges and justices of the peace. The Crown today primarily functions as a guarantor of continuous and stable governance and a nonpartisan safeguard against the abuse of power. This arrangement began with an 1871 Order in Council by Queen Victoria and continued an unbroken line of monarchical government extending back to the late 18th century. However, though British Columbia has a separate government headed by the King, as a province, British Columbia is not itself a kingdom.

Government House in Victoria is owned by the sovereign only in his capacity as King in Right of British Columbia and is the official residence of both the lieutenant governor and the sovereign, when in British Columbia.

A member of the Royal Family has owned property in British Columbia in a private capacity: Princess Margaret, Countess of Snowdon, owned Portland Island, though this was offered on permanent loan to the Crown in Right of British Columbia.

== Royal associations ==
Those in the Royal Family perform ceremonial duties when on a tour of the province; the royal persons do not receive any personal income for their service, only the costs associated with the exercise of these obligations are funded by both the Canadian and British Columbia governments. Monuments around British Columbia mark some of those visits, while others honour a royal personage or event. Further, British Columbia's monarchical status is illustrated by royal names applied regions, communities, schools, and buildings, many of which may also have a specific history with a member or members of the Royal Family. Associations also exist between the Crown and many private organizations within the province; these may have been founded by a Royal Charter, received a royal prefix, and/or been honoured with the patronage of a member of the Royal Family. Examples include the Royal Vancouver Yacht Club, which, along with the Vancouver Rowing Club and the Vancouver Racquets Club, is under the patronage of Prince Philip, Duke of Edinburgh, and the Royal British Columbia Museum, which received its royal prefix from Queen Elizabeth II in 1987.

The main symbol of the monarchy is the sovereign himself, his image (in portrait or effigy) thus being used to signify government authority. A royal cypher, crown, or the provincial arms (known as the Arms of His Majesty in right of British Columbia) may also illustrate the monarchy as the locus of authority, without referring to any specific monarch. Additionally, though the monarch does not form a part of the constitutions of British Columbia's honours, they do stem from the Crown as the fount of honour, and so bear on the insignia symbols of the sovereign.

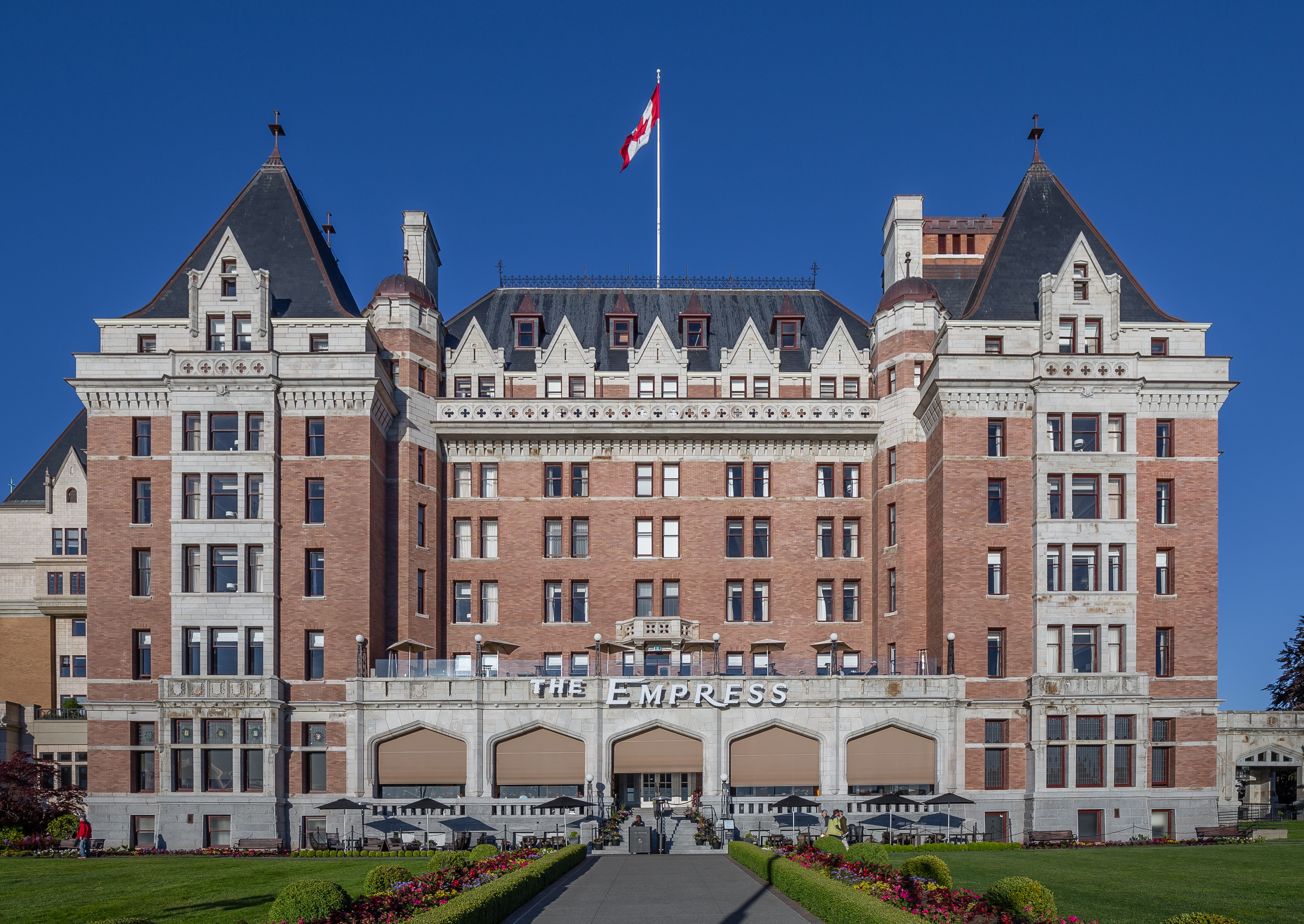
The Empress Hotel in Victoria, both of which were named for Queen Victoria

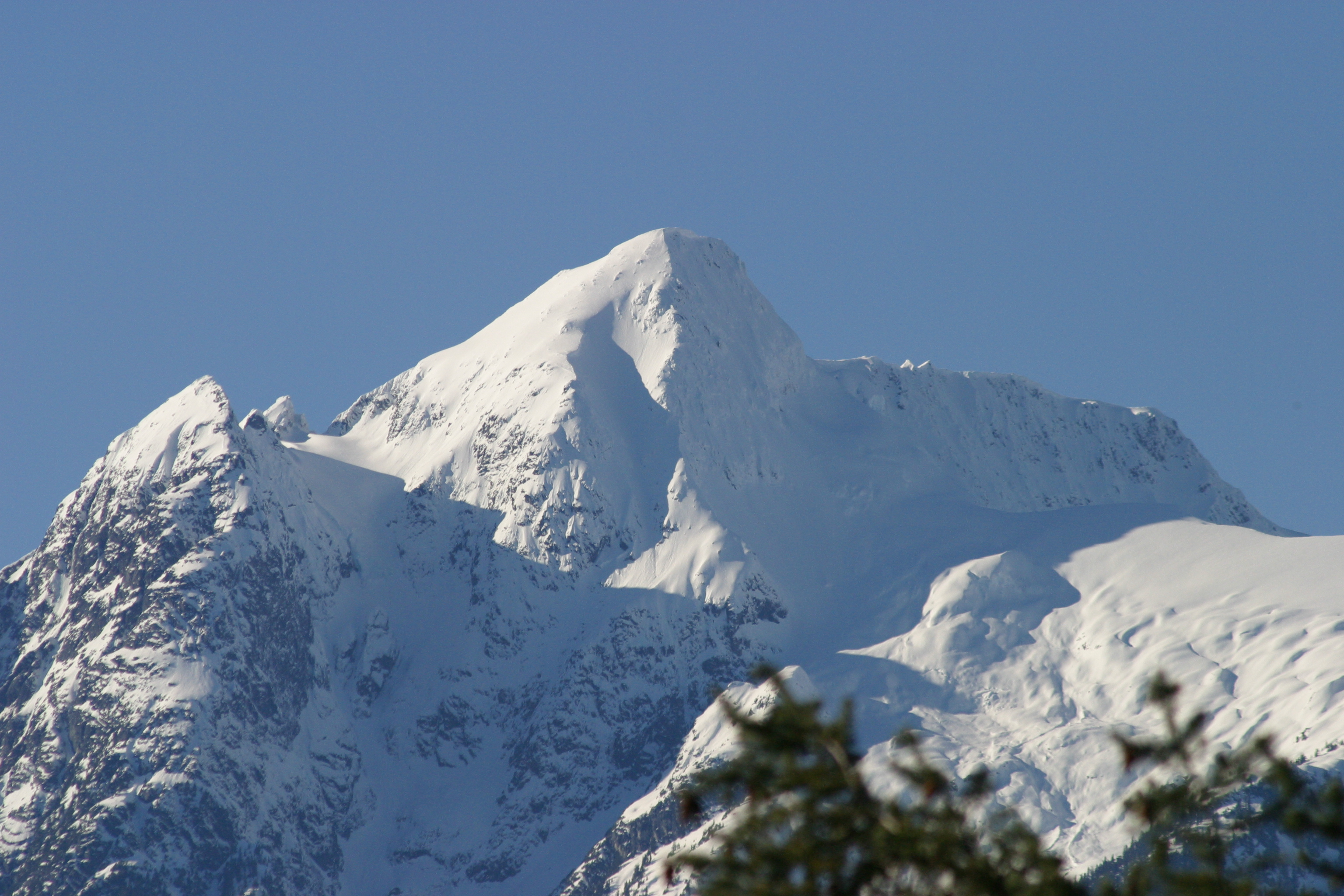
Mount Alfred, named in honour of Prince Alfred

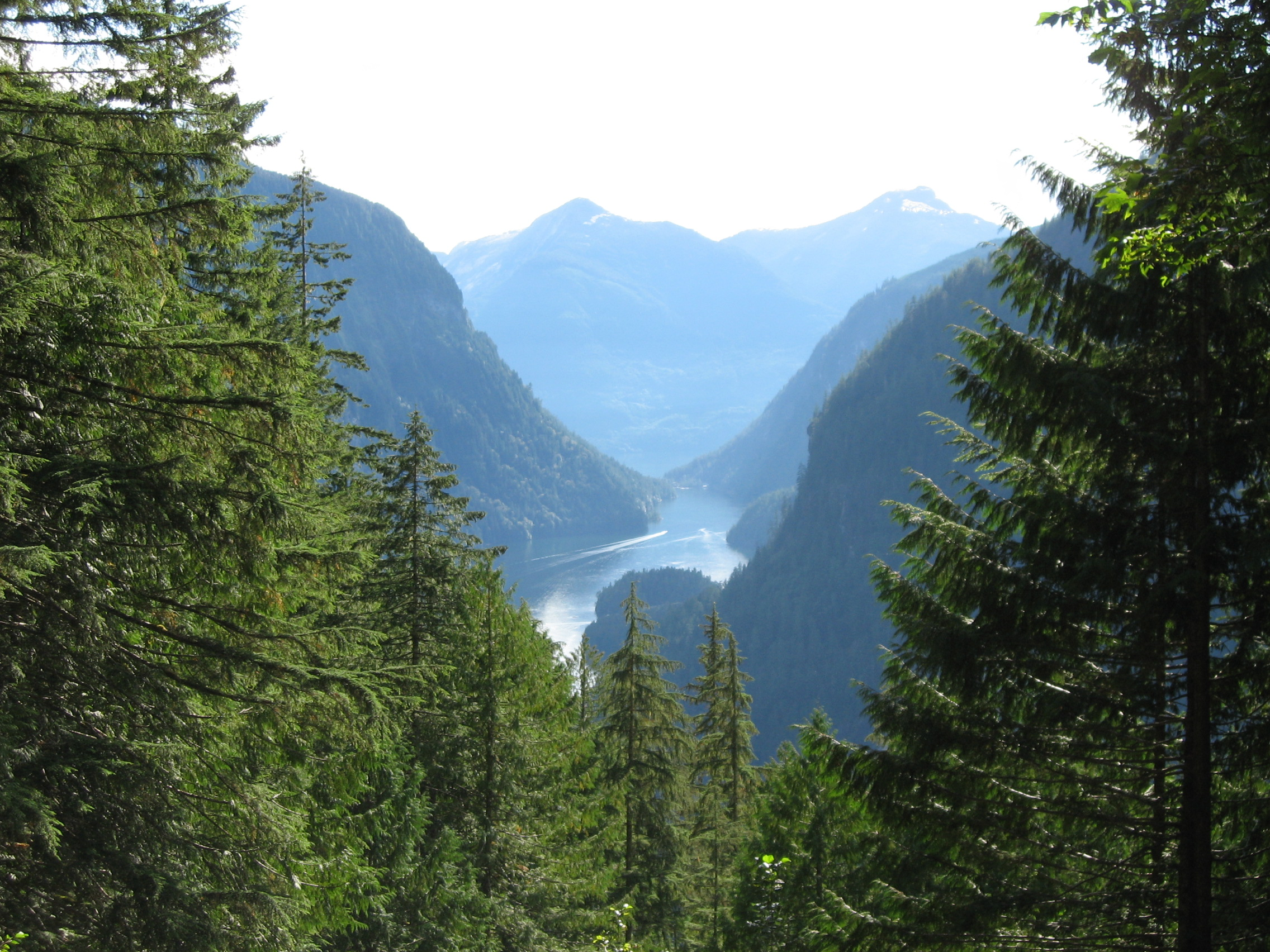
Princess Louisa Inlet, the name of which remembers Princess Louise, Duchess of Argyll

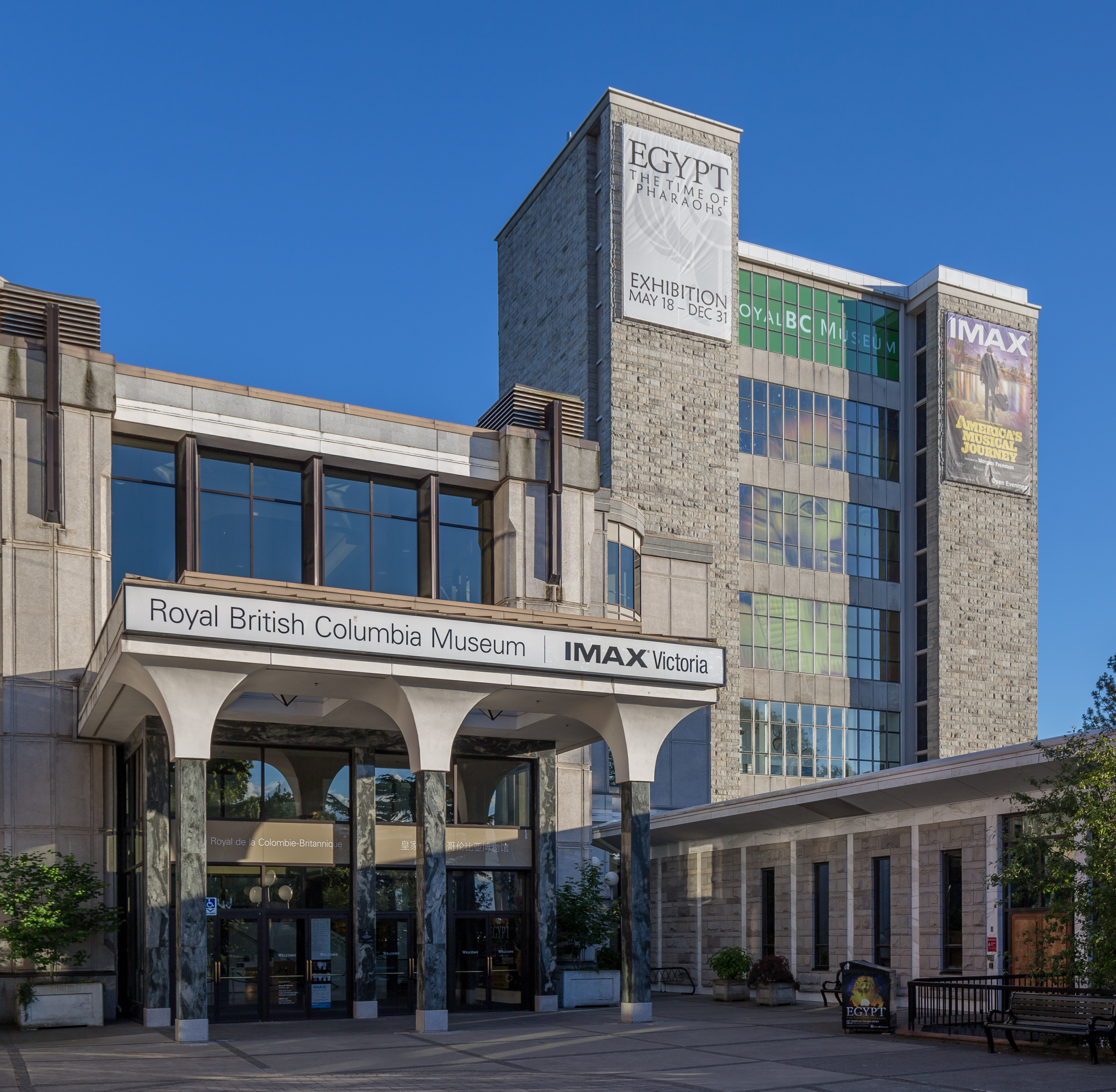
The Royal British Columbia Museum, Victoria

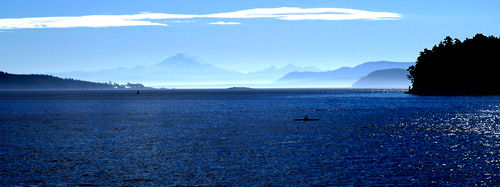
The Strait of Georgia, named for King George III

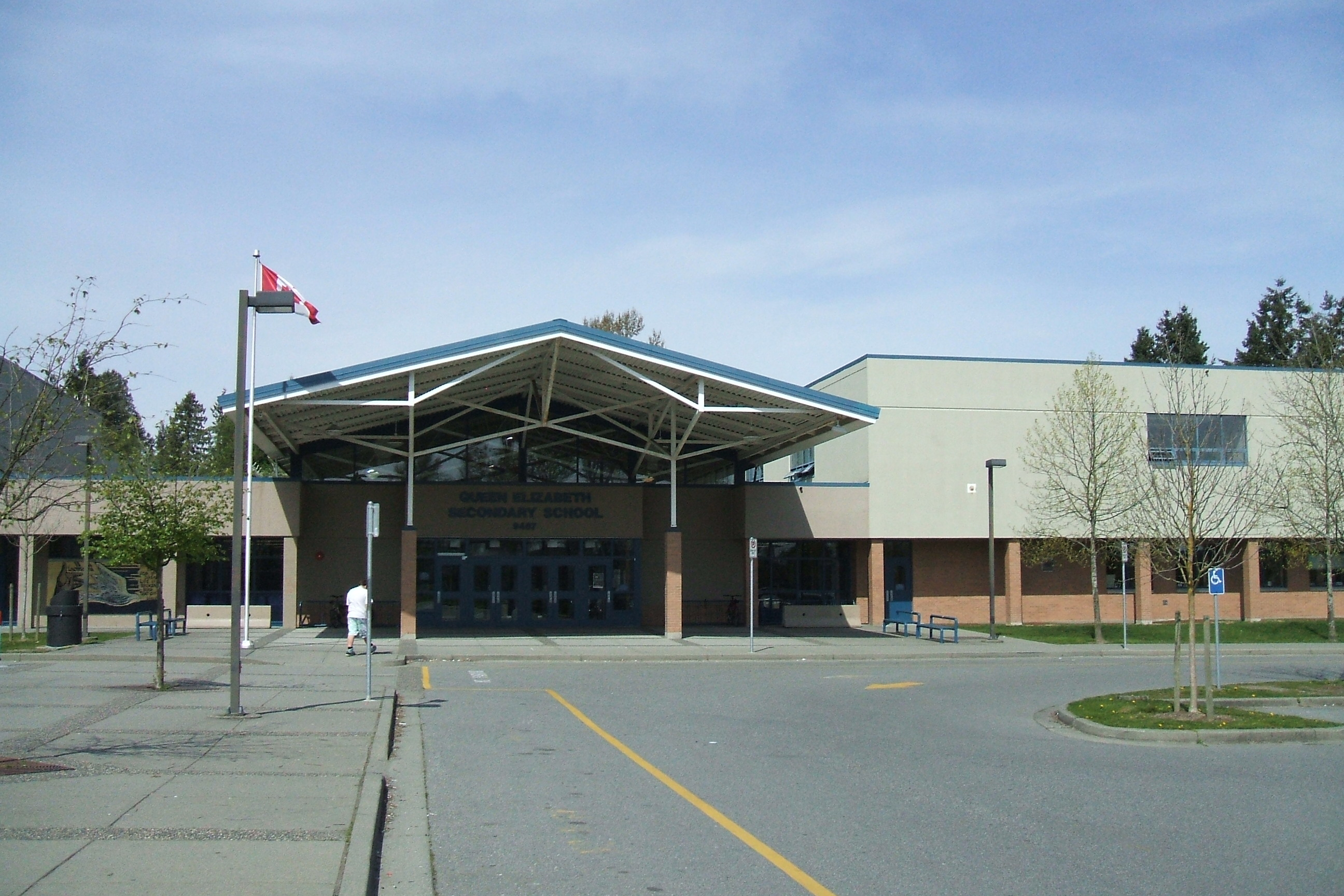
Queen Elizabeth Secondary School in Surrey, named for Queen Elizabeth (later the Queen Mother)

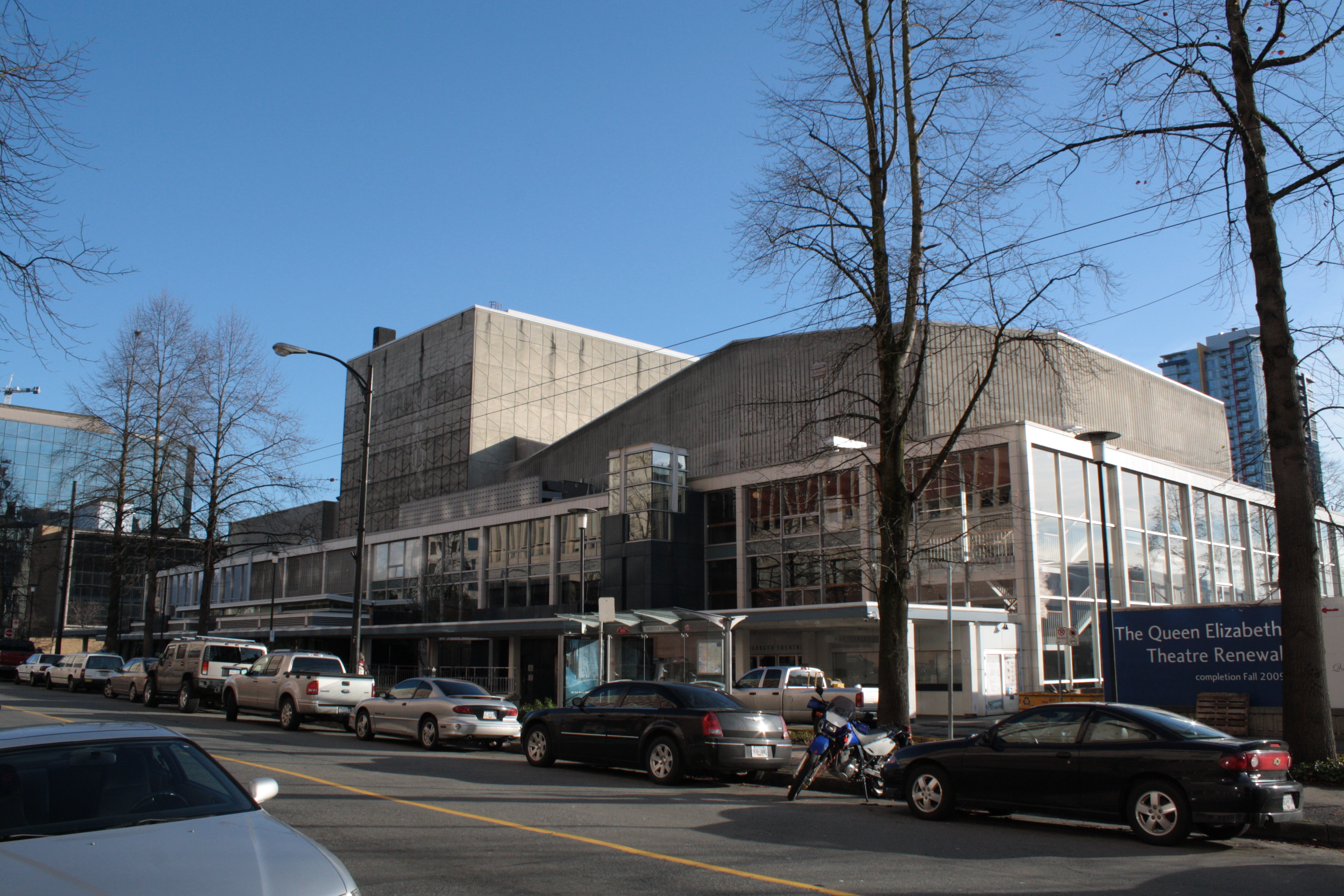
The Queen Elizabeth Theatre in Vancouver, named for Queen Elizabeth II

== History ==
In 1959, Premier W.A.C. Bennett desired that the Queen of Canada read the Speech from the Throne at the opening of a session of the Legislative Assembly of British Columbia. This request was turned down on the grounds that it was "constitutionally impossible". The validity and logic behind the refusal was later a matter of debate.

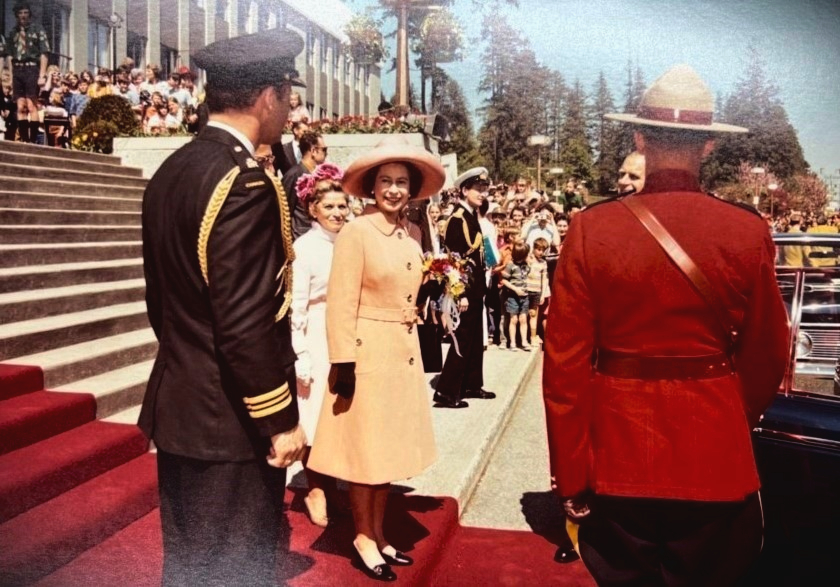
Elizabeth II, Queen of Canada, at City Hall in New Westminster, 1971

The Queen was again in British Columbia to mark the centennial of the province's entry into Confederation. In 2002, Elizabeth toured Victoria and Vancouver as part of her Golden Jubilee as Queen of Canada.

Prince Charles, Prince of Wales (now Charles III, King of Canada), along with his great-uncle, the Earl Mountbatten of Burma, then the President of United World Colleges International Council, opened Lester B. Pearson College of the Pacific in 1975. Prince Charles established the Prince of Wales Scholarship and would visit the college again between 30 March and 3 April 1980 and 29 to 31 October 1982. He also toured British Columbia with his then-wife, Diana, Princess of Wales, from 30 April to 7 May 1986, opening Expo 86 in Vancouver and visiting Victoria, Prince George, Kamloops, and Nanaimo, and took a ski holiday at Whistler with his sons, Princes William and Harry, also visiting Vancouver with them. In 2009, Charles returned with his second wife, Camilla, Duchess of Cornwall (now Queen Camilla), visiting Vancouver and Victoria, where he met with then-Director of Lester B. Pearson United World College of the Pacific David Hawley and four Prince of Wales Scholarship recipients, one each from Kenya, Romania, Nicaragua, and Canada.

== See also ==
- Symbols of British Columbia
- Monarchy

== Sources ==
- MacLeod, Kevin S. (2008). A Crown of Maples (PDF) (1 ed.). Ottawa: Queen's Printer for Canada. p. 16. ISBN 978-0-662-46012-1.
