= Premier of British Columbia =

Head of government of British Columbia

- Coat of arms of British Columbia

- Flag of British Columbia

- Incumbent; Lorne Doerkson since November 20, 2026
- Office of the Premier
- Style: The Honourable (formal); Premier (informal)
- Status: Head of Government
- Member of: Legislative Assembly; Executive Council
- Reports to: Legislative Assembly; Lieutenant Governor
- Seat: Victoria
- Appointer: Lieutenant Governor of British Columbia; (with the confidence of the British Columbia Legislature)
- Term length: At His Majesty's pleasure; (contingent on the premier's ability to command confidence in the Legislative Assembly)
- Formation: November 13, 1871
- First holder: John Foster McCreight
- Deputy: Deputy premier of British Columbia
- Salary: $218,587.27
- Website: Office of the Premier

The premier of British Columbia is the first minister and head of government for the Canadian province of British Columbia. Until the early 1970s, the title prime minister of British Columbia was often used. The word premier is derived from the French word of the same spelling, meaning "first"; and ultimately from the Latin word primarius, meaning "primary".

== Legal status ==
Although the premier is the day-to-day leader of the provincial government, they receive the authority to govern from the Crown (represented in British Columbia by the province's lieutenant governor). Formally, the executive branch of government in British Columbia is said to be vested in the lieutenant governor acting by and with the advice and consent of the executive council.

The position of premier is not described in Canadian constitutional statutes. By convention, the leader of the political party that has the support of a majority of members of the Legislative Assembly is usually invited by the lieutenant governor to form the government.

== Formal responsibilities ==
The responsibilities of the premier usually include:

- recommending the appointment and dismissal of ministers to the Lieutenant Governor
- serving as the president of the Executive Council and head of the provincial Cabinet.
- leading the development and implementation of government policies and priorities
- serving as the senior communicator of government priorities and plans between:
  - the Lieutenant Governor and Cabinet
  - the British Columbia government and other provincial and territorial governments
  - the British Columbia Government and the federal government and international governments

== President of the Executive Council ==
Generally, the premier selects MLAs from their party to be appointed ministers of the Crown by the Lieutenant Governor. Cabinet appointees are designated ministers in charge of government ministries; they are responsible for the day-to-day activities of individual government ministries such as the Ministry of Forests, and for proposing new laws or changing existing ones. The premier may also choose an individual who is not an MLA to be a cabinet minister, although on the rare occasion that this does happen, the practice is that the minister proceeds to obtain a seat in the House. The appointment of an MLA to Cabinet is based on their ability and expertise and is also influenced by political considerations such as geography, gender and ethnicity.

A minister remains in office solely at the pleasure of the premier. The resignation of the premier also triggers the resignation of the other members of Cabinet.

== See also ==
- Prime Minister of Canada
- Premier (Canada)
- List of premiers of British Columbia
