= Coat of arms of British Columbia =

Heraldic symbol of Canadian province

Arms of His Majesty The King in Right of British Columbia

Versions
- Escutcheon

- For use by the Lieutenant Governor of British Columbia
- Armiger: Charles III in Right of British Columbia
- Adopted: 1906, augmented 1987
- Crest: Upon a helm with a wreath argent and gules the royal crest of general purpose of our royal predecessor Queen Victoria differenced for us and our successors in right of British Columbia with the lion thereof garlanded about the neck with the provincial flower that is to say the pacific dogwood (Cornus nuttallii) with leaves all proper mantled gules doubled argent.
- Shield: Argent, 3 bars wavy azure, issuant from the base a demi-sun in splendour proper, on a chief, the Union Device charged in the centre point with an antique crown Or
- Supporters: On the dexter side, a wapiti stag (Cervus canadensis) proper and on the sinister side a bighorn sheep ram (Ovis canadensis) argent armed and unguled Or.
- Compartment: Beneath the shield a scroll entwined with pacific dogwood flowers slipped and leaved proper inscribed with the motto assigned by the said warrant of our royal predecessor King Edward VII that is to say Splendor sine occasu.
- Motto: Splendor sine occasu "Splendour without diminishment"

The coat of arms of British Columbia is the heraldic symbol representing the Canadian province of British Columbia. The arms contain symbols reflecting British Columbia's British heritage along with local symbols. At the upper part of the shield is the Union Jack, representing the United Kingdom. The lower portion of the shield features a golden sun setting into the ocean, representing the province's location on the Pacific.

The original arms, consisting of only the shield, were granted by royal warrant of King Edward VII on 31 March 1906. The arms were further augmented with supporters, a crest, and a compartment, by royal warrant of Queen Elizabeth II on 15 October 1987.

A banner of arms comprises the provincial flag, which was adopted in 1960.

== History ==
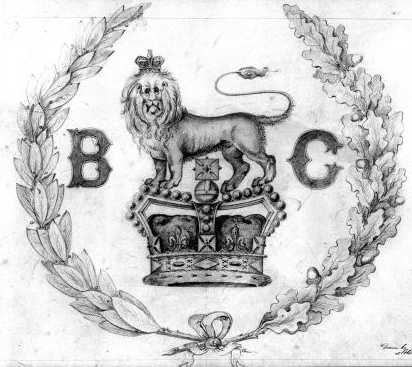
The colonial-era badge based on the Royal Crest

A modern rendering of the initial 1895 version of the arms

The Great Seal of British Columbia during Queen Elizabeth II's reign

The first heraldic provincial symbol was the Great Seal of the province: the royal crest of the crowned lion upon the imperial crown, as was the usual practice for British colonies, but with the letters "BC" added. This design was created by Richard Clement Moody. This design was used upon British Columbia joining Confederation.

The first coat of arms of the province was created by Canon Arthur Beanlands of Victoria, whose version was similar to the modern one: "The union device of Great Britain and Ireland: on a chief barry undée argent and azure, a setting sun in base Or." This coat was adopted by Order-in-Council 268 July 19, 1895, as the arms and great seal of the province per the authority inferred from Section 136 of the British North America Act. Upon the order in council, the motto of the province is typeset incorrectly as Spendor Sine Occasu [sic], which is one of several hand-made corrections and deletions upon the instrument.

While the design of the great seal was a provincial prerogative, coats of arms were (and are) honours granted by the sovereign. The province attempted to register the design with the English College of Arms in 1897, but was unable to do so for several reasons. First among them was the use of the royal crest, which is the exclusive right of the sovereign and could not be granted to another entity even as a sign of utmost loyalty to the Queen. The heralds objected to the placement of the Union Flag in an inferior position on the shield (conflicting with the popular slogan, "The sun never sets on the British Empire"). The use of supporters, a high honour, was considered presumptuous, as no other province had been granted such a privilege.

The shield only (with the positions of the Union Flag and setting sun reversed, and with the antique crown added), along with the motto, was granted in 1906. The achievement of arms was augmented with a crest, supporters, and compartment granted by Queen Elizabeth II, on 15 October 1987.

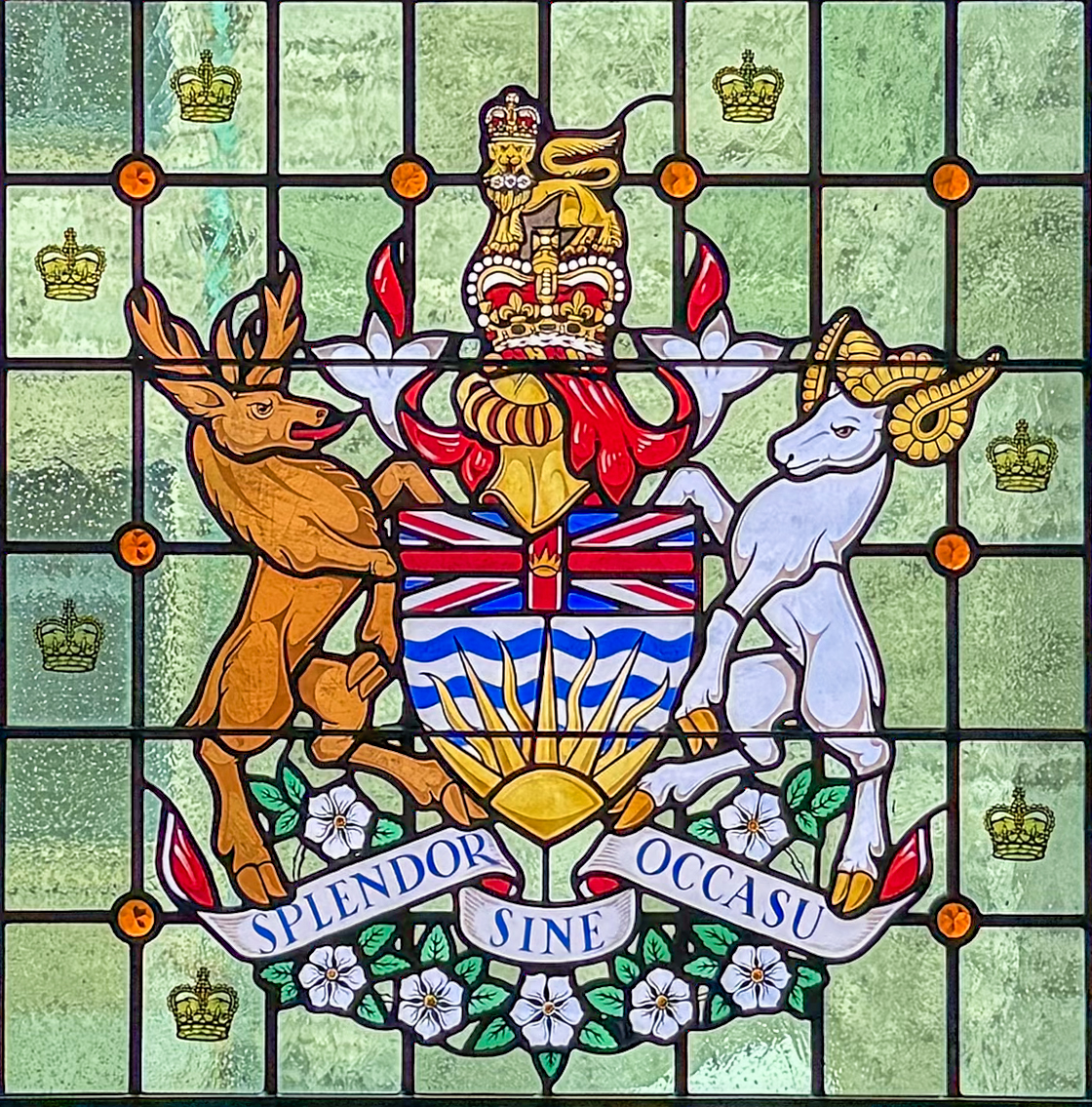
The arms rendered in stained glass in the Parliament Buildings in Victoria

== Symbolism ==
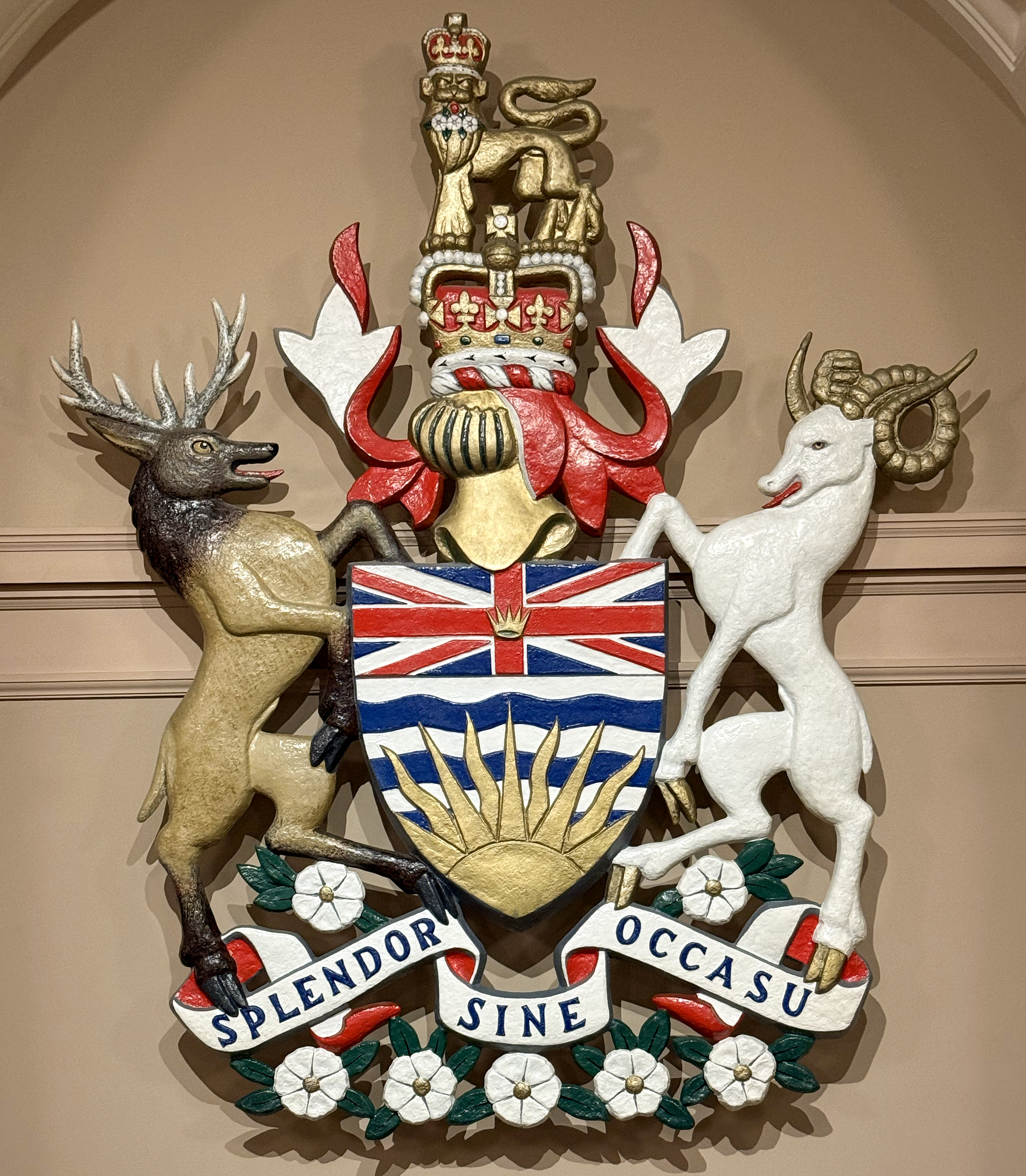
The arms on a wall inside the Parliament Buildings

Crest
The crest is the King's royal crest for the United Kingdom (a gold lion statant gardant—standing on all fours and facing the viewer—wearing the royal crown), differenced with a garland of Pacific dogwood, the provincial flower.
Shield
The shield features a Union Flag in chief, with a crown (known heraldically as an antique crown) at its centre. In base it has the sun setting into the ocean, representing the province's location on the Pacific.
Compartment
The compartment is a garland of Pacific Dogwood.
Supporters
The supporters are a wapiti (also known as elk) stag and a bighorn sheep. The wapiti of Vancouver Island and the bighorn sheep of the mainland of the province symbolize the union of the two colonies which united to form British Columbia in 1866
Motto
The motto Splendor sine occasu, is Latin and refers to the idea of the sun never setting over the British Empire. Occasus (the form occasu is the ablative, required after the preposition sine) literally means a "setting" or a "going down", such as of the sun, and by extension can refer to "the west". While one can translate the phrase to mean "splendour without diminishment", in combination with the geographical position of British Columbia (in the far west of the former British Empire), the setting sun shown on the shield, and the old concept of the sun never setting over the Empire, the motto should be understood to express the idea "a shining without a sunset".

== See also ==
- Flag of British Columbia
- Symbols of British Columbia
- Canadian heraldry
- National symbols of Canada
- List of Canadian provincial and territorial symbols
- Heraldry
